= Gran Galà del Calcio =

Event organised by the Italian Footballers' Association

The Gran Galà del Calcio AIC is an event organised by the Italian Footballers' Association (AIC) in order to reward players, managers and referees who have been considered to have performed the best over the previous Serie A season. The winners of the awards are chosen by the league's footballers. It replaced the Oscar del Calcio AIC in 2011, which had occurred since 1997.

== List of awards ==
=== Current ===
- Serie A Team of the Year
- Serie A Footballer of the Year
- Serie A Coach of the Year
- Serie B Footballer of the Year
- Serie A Goalkeeper of the Year
- Serie A Referee of the Year
- Serie A Football Club of the Year
- Serie A Women's Team of the Year
- Serie A Female Footballer of the Year

=== Discontinued ===
- Serie A Italian Footballer of the Year
- Serie A Foreign Footballer of the Year
- Serie A Young Footballer of the Year
- Serie A Defender of the Year

=== Special awards ===
The following prizes have been awarded only in one or a few editions.

==== Critics' Award ====
Year	Club	Ref(s)
2011	Fabio Capello	

==== Lifetime Achievement Award ====
Year	Club	Ref(s)
2011	Alessandro Del Piero	
2011	Fabio Cannavaro	
2012	Filippo Inzaghi	
2018	Andrea Pirlo	
2018	Francesco Totti	
2025	Giorgio Chiellini	
2025	Leonardo Bonucci	

==== Loyalty Award ====
Year	Nat.	Player	Club	Ref(s)
2012	(Argentina)	Javier Zanetti	Internazionale	

==== Serie A Best Team ====
Year	Club	Ref(s)
1997	Juventus	
1998	Juventus	
1999	Lazio	
2009	Internazionale	
2010	Internazionale	

==== Serie A Best Young Revelation ====
Year	Nat.	Player	Club	Ref(s)
2012	(Italy)	Stephan El Shaarawy	Milan	
2012	(Colombia)	Luis Muriel	Udinese	

==== Serie A Fair Play Award ====
Year	Nat.	Winner	Club	Ref(s)
2007	(Italy)	Fiorentina	–	
2008	(Italy)	Franco Brienza	Reggina	
2009	(Italy)	Giuseppe Pillon	Ascoli	
2010	(Italy)	Antonio Di Natale	Udinese	

==== Serie A Men's Goal of the Year ====
Year	Player	Club	Match	Ref(s)
2004	(Ukraine) Andriy Shevchenko	Milan	Roma – Milan (6 January 2004)	
2005	(Italy) Francesco Totti	Roma	Inter – Roma (26 October 2005)	
2006	(Italy) Francesco Totti	Roma	Sampdoria – Roma (26 November 2006)	
2007	(Italy) Riccardo Zampagna	Atalanta	Fiorentina – Atalanta (16 September 2007)	
2008	(Sweden) Zlatan Ibrahimović	Internazionale	Inter – Bologna (4 October 2008)	
2009	(Italy) Fabio Quagliarella	Udinese	Napoli – Udinese (31 January 2009)	
2010	(Brazil) Maicon	Internazionale	Inter – Juventus (16 April 2010)	
2018	(Argentina) Mauro Icardi	Internazionale	Sampdoria – Inter (18 March 2018)	
2019	(Italy) Fabio Quagliarella	Sampdoria	Sampdoria – Napoli (2 September 2018)	
2021	(Italy) Mattia Zaccagni	Hellas Verona	Spezia – Hellas Verona (3 January 2021)	
2022	(France) Théo Hernandez	Milan	Milan – Atalanta (15 May 2022)	
2023	(Georgia (country)) Khvicha Kvaratskhelia	Napoli	Napoli – Atalanta (11 March 2023)	
2024	(France) Marcus Thuram	Internazionale	Inter – Milan (16 September 2023)	
2025	(Italy) Alessandro Deiola	Cagliari	Cagliari – Venezia (18 May 2025)	
2026	(Portugal) Francisco Conceição	Juventus	Roma – Juventus (1 March 2026)	

==== Serie A Women's Goal of the Year ====
Year	Player	Club	Match	Ref(s)
2019	(Brazil) Thaisa Moreno	Milan	Milan – Juventus (4 November 2018)	
2021	(Italy) Barbara Bonansea	Juventus	Juventus – Empoli (20 August 2020)	
2022	(Italy) Martina Rosucci	Juventus	Roma – Juventus (2 October 2021)	
2023	(Italy) Manuela Giugliano	Roma	Roma – Sassuolo (29 January 2023)	

==== Serie A Goalscorer of the Year ====
Year	Nat.	Player	Club	Ref(s)
2006	(Italy)	Luca Toni	Fiorentina	
2007	(Italy)	Francesco Totti	Roma	
2008	(Sweden)	Zlatan Ibrahimović	Juventus	
2009	(Argentina)	Diego Milito	Internazionale	
2010	(Italy)	Antonio Di Natale	Udinese	

==== Serie A Most Loved Player ====
Year	Nat.	Player	Club	Ref(s)
2001	(Italy)	Alessandro Del Piero	Juventus	
2002	(Italy)	Roberto Baggio	Brescia	
2005	(Sweden)	Zlatan Ibrahimović	Juventus	
2006	(Italy)	Gianluigi Buffon	Juventus	
2007	(Italy)	Gianluigi Buffon	Juventus	
2008	(Italy)	Alessandro Del Piero	Juventus	
2009	(Argentina)	Diego Milito	Internazionale	
2010	(Uruguay)	Edinson Cavani	Napoli	

==== Serie A Player of the Century ====
Year	Nat.	Player	Club	Ref(s)
2000	(Italy)	Franco Baresi	Milan	

==== "Legend" Special Award ====
Year	Nat.	Player	Ref(s)
2023	(Italy)	Gianluigi Buffon	
2024	(Italy)	Demetrio Albertini	
2024	(Italy)	Alessandro Costacurta	
2024	(Italy)	Roberto Donadoni	
2024	(Italy)	Mauro Tassotti	

==== "Il Campo Giusto" Award ====
Year	Nat.	Player	Club	Ref(s)
2025	(Italy)	Pio Esposito	Inter Milan	

== See also ==
- Serie A Team of the Year
- Guerin d'Oro
- Panchina d'Oro
- Serie A Awards
