= Serie A Team of the Year =

Italian football award

- Sport: Association football
- Competition: Serie A
- Awarded for: Eleven footballers considered to have performed the best in their position in each given Serie A season
- Local name: Squadra dell'anno AIC (Italian)
- Country: Italy
- Presented by: Italian Footballers' Association (AIC)

History
- First award: 2010–11
- Editions: 16
- Most wins: Nicolò Barella (7 times)
- Website: Official website

The AIC Serie A Team of the Year (in Italian: Squadra dell’anno AIC) is an annual award given to a set of eleven footballers in the top tier of Italian football, the Serie A, who are considered to have performed the best during the previous calendar season. It is awarded within the Gran Galà del Calcio event.

The award has been presented since the 2010–11 season. The shortlist is compiled by the members of the players' trade union, the Italian Footballers' Association (AIC).

== Winners ==
Players in bold also won the Serie A Footballer of the Year award.

=== 2010–11 ===
Position	Player	Club	Appearance
GK	(Slovenia) Samir Handanović	Udinese	1
DF	(Italy) Christian Maggio	Napoli	1
DF	(Brazil) Thiago Silva	Milan	1
DF	(Italy) Alessandro Nesta (Italy) Andrea Ranocchia	Milan Internazionale	1
DF	(Colombia) Pablo Armero	Udinese	1
MF	(Slovakia) Marek Hamšík	Napoli	1
MF	(Italy) Thiago Motta (Italy) Claudio Marchisio	Internazionale Juventus	1
MF	(Ghana) Kevin-Prince Boateng	Milan	1
FW	(Uruguay) Edinson Cavani	Napoli	1
FW	(Italy) Antonio Di Natale	Udinese	1
FW	(Sweden) **Zlatan Ibrahimović**	Milan	1

=== 2011–12 ===
Position	Player	Club	Appearance
GK	(Italy) Gianluigi Buffon	Juventus	1
DF	(Italy) Christian Maggio	Napoli	2
DF	(Brazil) Thiago Silva	Milan	2
DF	(Italy) Andrea Barzagli	Juventus	1
DF	(Italy) Federico Balzaretti	Palermo	1
MF	(Italy) Claudio Marchisio	Juventus	2
MF	(Italy) **Andrea Pirlo**	Juventus	1
MF	(Italy) Antonio Nocerino	Milan	1
FW	(Uruguay) Edinson Cavani	Napoli	2
FW	(Italy) Antonio Di Natale	Udinese	2
FW	(Sweden) Zlatan Ibrahimović	Milan	2

=== 2012–13 ===
Position	Player	Club	Appearance
GK	(Slovenia) Samir Handanović	Internazionale	2
DF	(Italy) Christian Maggio	Napoli	3
DF	(Italy) Andrea Barzagli	Juventus	2
DF	(Italy) Giorgio Chiellini	Juventus	1
DF	(Italy) Mattia De Sciglio	Milan	1
MF	(Chile) Arturo Vidal	Juventus	1
MF	(Italy) **Andrea Pirlo**	Juventus	2
MF	(Spain) Borja Valero	Fiorentina	1
FW	(Uruguay) Edinson Cavani	Napoli	3
FW	(Italy) Antonio Di Natale	Udinese	3
FW	(Italy) Mario Balotelli	Milan	1

=== 2013–14 ===
Position	Player	Club	Appearance
GK	(Italy) Gianluigi Buffon	Juventus	2
DF	(Italy) Matteo Darmian	Torino	1
DF	(Italy) Andrea Barzagli	Juventus	3
DF	(Morocco) Medhi Benatia	Roma	1
DF	(Ghana) Kwadwo Asamoah	Juventus	1
MF	(Chile) Arturo Vidal	Juventus	2
MF	(Italy) **Andrea Pirlo**	Juventus	3
MF	(France) Paul Pogba	Juventus	1
FW	(Italy) Ciro Immobile	Torino	1
FW	(Argentina) Gonzalo Higuaín	Napoli	1
FW	(Argentina) Carlos Tevez	Juventus	1

=== 2014–15 ===
Position	Player	Club	Appearance
GK	(Italy) Gianluigi Buffon	Juventus	3
DF	(Italy) Matteo Darmian	Torino	2
DF	(Italy) Leonardo Bonucci	Juventus	1
DF	(Italy) Daniele Rugani	Empoli	1
DF	(Italy) Giorgio Chiellini	Juventus	2
MF	(Belgium) Radja Nainggolan	Roma	1
MF	(Italy) Andrea Pirlo	Juventus	4
MF	(France) Paul Pogba	Juventus	2
FW	(Argentina) Mauro Icardi	Internazionale	1
FW	(Italy) Luca Toni	Hellas Verona	1
FW	(Argentina) **Carlos Tevez**	Juventus	2

=== 2015–16 ===
Position	Player	Club	Appearance
GK	(Italy) Gianluigi Buffon	Juventus	4
DF	(Senegal) Kalidou Koulibaly	Napoli	1
DF	(Italy) **Leonardo Bonucci**	Juventus	2
DF	(Italy) Andrea Barzagli	Juventus	4
DF	(Italy) Giorgio Chiellini	Juventus	3
MF	(Belgium) Radja Nainggolan	Roma	2
MF	(Bosnia and Herzegovina) Miralem Pjanić	Roma	1
MF	(France) Paul Pogba	Juventus	3
MF	(Slovakia) Marek Hamšík	Napoli	2
FW	(Argentina) Paulo Dybala	Juventus	1
FW	(Argentina) Gonzalo Higuaín	Napoli	2

=== 2016–17 ===
Position	Player	Club	Appearance
GK	(Italy) **Gianluigi Buffon**	Juventus	5
DF	(Brazil) Dani Alves	Juventus	1
DF	(Italy) Leonardo Bonucci	Juventus	3
DF	(Senegal) Kalidou Koulibaly	Napoli	2
DF	(Brazil) Alex Sandro	Juventus	1
MF	(Belgium) Radja Nainggolan	Roma	3
MF	(Bosnia and Herzegovina) Miralem Pjanić	Juventus	2
MF	(Slovakia) Marek Hamšík	Napoli	3
FW	(Belgium) Dries Mertens	Napoli	1
FW	(Argentina) Gonzalo Higuaín	Juventus	3
FW	(Argentina) Paulo Dybala	Juventus	2

=== 2017–18 ===
Position	Player	Club	Appearance
GK	(Brazil) Alisson	Roma	1
DF	(Portugal) João Cancelo	Internazionale	1
DF	(Senegal) Kalidou Koulibaly	Napoli	3
DF	(Italy) Giorgio Chiellini	Juventus	4
DF	(Brazil) Alex Sandro	Juventus	2
MF	(Serbia) Sergej Milinković-Savić	Lazio	1
MF	(Bosnia and Herzegovina) Miralem Pjanić	Juventus	3
MF	(Belgium) Radja Nainggolan	Roma	4
FW	(Argentina) Paulo Dybala	Juventus	3
FW	(Italy) Ciro Immobile	Lazio	2
FW	(Argentina) **Mauro Icardi**	Internazionale	2

=== 2018–19 ===
Position	Player	Club	Appearance
GK	(Slovenia) Samir Handanović	Internazionale	3
DF	(Portugal) João Cancelo	Juventus	2
DF	(Senegal) Kalidou Koulibaly	Napoli	4
DF	(Italy) Giorgio Chiellini	Juventus	5
DF	(Serbia) Aleksandar Kolarov	Roma	1
MF	(Italy) Nicolò Barella	Cagliari	1
MF	(Bosnia and Herzegovina) Miralem Pjanić	Juventus	4
MF	(Slovenia) Josip Iličić	Atalanta	1
FW	(Italy) Fabio Quagliarella	Sampdoria	1
FW	(Colombia) Duván Zapata	Atalanta	1
FW	(Portugal) **Cristiano Ronaldo**	Juventus	1

=== 2019–20 ===
Position	Player	Club	Appearance
GK	(Italy) Gianluigi Donnarumma	Milan	1
DF	(Germany) Robin Gosens	Atalanta	1
DF	(Netherlands) Stefan de Vrij	Internazionale	1
DF	(Italy) Leonardo Bonucci	Juventus	4
DF	(France) Théo Hernandez	Milan	1
MF	(Italy) Nicolò Barella	Internazionale	2
MF	(Argentina) Alejandro Gómez	Atalanta	1
MF	(Spain) Luis Alberto	Lazio	1
FW	(Argentina) Paulo Dybala	Juventus	4
FW	(Italy) Ciro Immobile	Lazio	3
FW	(Portugal) **Cristiano Ronaldo**	Juventus	2

=== 2020–21 ===
Position	Player	Club	Appearance
GK	(Italy) Gianluigi Donnarumma	Milan	2
DF	(Morocco) Achraf Hakimi	Internazionale	1
DF	(Netherlands) Stefan de Vrij	Internazionale	2
DF	(Italy) Alessandro Bastoni	Internazionale	1
DF	(France) Théo Hernandez	Milan	2
MF	(Italy) Nicolò Barella	Internazionale	3
MF	(Ivory Coast) Franck Kessié	Milan	1
MF	(Italy) Federico Chiesa	Juventus	1
FW	(Colombia) Luis Muriel	Atalanta	1
FW	(Belgium) **Romelu Lukaku**	Internazionale	1
FW	(Portugal) Cristiano Ronaldo	Juventus	3

=== 2021–22 ===
Position	Player	Club	Appearance
GK	(France) Mike Maignan	Milan	1
DF	(Italy) Giovanni Di Lorenzo	Napoli	1
DF	(Brazil) Bremer	Torino	1
DF	(England) Fikayo Tomori	Milan	1
DF	(France) Théo Hernandez	Milan	3
MF	(Italy) Nicolò Barella	Internazionale	4
MF	(Croatia) Marcelo Brozović	Internazionale	1
MF	(Serbia) Sergej Milinković-Savić	Lazio	2
FW	(Italy) Ciro Immobile	Lazio	4
FW	(Portugal) **Rafael Leão**	Milan	1
FW	(Serbia) Dušan Vlahović	Fiorentina/Juventus	1

=== 2022–23 ===
Position	Player	Club	Appearance
GK	(France) Mike Maignan	Milan	2
DF	(Italy) Giovanni Di Lorenzo	Napoli	2
DF	(Italy) Alessandro Bastoni	Internazionale	2
DF	(South Korea) Kim Min-jae	Napoli	1
DF	(France) Théo Hernandez	Milan	4
MF	(Italy) Nicolò Barella	Internazionale	5
MF	(Turkey) Hakan Çalhanoğlu	Internazionale	1
MF	(Slovakia) Stanislav Lobotka	Napoli	1
FW	(Georgia (country)) Khvicha Kvaratskhelia	Napoli	1
FW	(Portugal) Rafael Leão	Milan	2
FW	(Nigeria) **Victor Osimhen**	Napoli	1

=== 2023–24 ===
Position	Player	Club	Appearance
GK	(Switzerland) Yann Sommer	Internazionale	1
DF	(Italy) Raoul Bellanova	Torino	1
DF	(Italy) Alessandro Bastoni	Internazionale	3
DF	(Italy) Riccardo Calafiori	Bologna	1
DF	(Italy) Federico Dimarco	Internazionale	1
MF	(Italy) Nicolò Barella	Internazionale	6
MF	(Turkey) Hakan Çalhanoğlu	Internazionale	2
MF	(Netherlands) Teun Koopmeiners	Atalanta	1
FW	(Netherlands) Joshua Zirkzee	Bologna	1
FW	(Argentina) **Lautaro Martínez**	Internazionale	1
FW	(France) Marcus Thuram	Internazionale	1

=== 2024–25 ===
Position	Player	Club	Appearance
GK	(Serbia) Mile Svilar	Roma	1
DF	(Netherlands) Denzel Dumfries	Internazionale	1
DF	(Kosovo) Amir Rrahmani	Napoli	1
DF	(Italy) Alessandro Bastoni	Internazionale	4
DF	(Italy) Federico Dimarco	Internazionale	2
MF	(Italy) Nicolò Barella	Internazionale	7
MF	(Netherlands) Tijjani Reijnders	Milan	1
MF	(Scotland) **Scott McTominay**	Napoli	1
FW	(Argentina) Lautaro Martínez	Internazionale	2
FW	(Italy) Mateo Retegui	Atalanta	1
FW	(Italy) Moise Kean	Fiorentina	1

=== 2025–26 ===
Position	Player	Club	Appearance
GK	(Serbia) Mile Svilar	Roma	2
DF	(Italy) Marco Palestra	Cagliari	1
DF	(Switzerland) Manuel Akanji	Internazionale	1
DF	(Italy) Alessandro Bastoni	Internazionale	5
DF	(Italy) **Federico Dimarco**	Internazionale	3
MF	(Turkey) Hakan Çalhanoğlu	Internazionale	3
MF	(Croatia) Luka Modrić	Milan	1
MF	(Scotland) Scott McTominay	Napoli	2
FW	(Argentina) Lautaro Martínez	Internazionale	3
FW	(Netherlands) Donyell Malen	Roma	1
FW	(Argentina) Nico Paz	Como	1

== Appearances by player ==
- 7 times: Nicolò Barella
- 5 times: Alessandro Bastoni, Gianluigi Buffon, Giorgio Chiellini
- 4 times: Andrea Barzagli, Leonardo Bonucci, Paulo Dybala, Théo Hernandez, Kalidou Koulibaly, Ciro Immobile, Andrea Pirlo, Miralem Pjanić, Radja Nainggolan
- 3 times: Hakan Çalhanoğlu, Edinson Cavani, Antonio Di Natale, Federico Dimarco, Marek Hamšík, Samir Handanović, Gonzalo Higuaín, Christian Maggio, Lautaro Martínez, Paul Pogba, Cristiano Ronaldo
- 2 times: João Cancelo, Matteo Darmian, Stefan de Vrij, Giovanni Di Lorenzo, Gianluigi Donnarumma, Zlatan Ibrahimović, Mauro Icardi, Rafael Leão, Mike Maignan, Claudio Marchisio, Scott McTominay, Sergej Milinković-Savić, Alex Sandro, Thiago Silva, Mile Svilar, Carlos Tevez, Arturo Vidal
- 1 time: Manuel Akanji, Luis Alberto, Alisson, Dani Alves, Pablo Armero, Kwadwo Asamoah, Mario Balotelli, Federico Balzaretti, Raoul Bellanova, Medhi Benatia, Kevin-Prince Boateng, Bremer, Marcelo Brozović, Riccardo Calafiori, Federico Chiesa, Mattia De Sciglio, Denzel Dumfries, Alejandro Gómez, Robin Gosens, Achraf Hakimi, Josip Iličić, Moise Kean, Franck Kessié, Kim Min-jae, Aleksandar Kolarov, Teun Koopmeiners, Khvicha Kvaratskhelia, Stanislav Lobotka, Romelu Lukaku, Donyell Malen, Dries Mertens, Luka Modrić, Thiago Motta, Luis Muriel, Alessandro Nesta, Antonio Nocerino, Victor Osimhen, Marco Palestra, Nico Paz, Fabio Quagliarella, Andrea Ranocchia, Tijjani Reijnders, Mateo Retegui, Amir Rrahmani, Daniele Rugani, Yann Sommer, Marcus Thuram, Fikayo Tomori, Luca Toni, Borja Valero, Dušan Vlahović, Duván Zapata, Joshua Zirkzee

== Appearances by club ==
Club	Appearances
Juventus	49 (Note: Dušan Vlahović award in 2021–22 is shared by Juventus and Fiorentina.)
Internazionale	36
Napoli	25
Milan	23
Roma	11
Atalanta	7
Lazio	6
Torino	5
Udinese	5
Fiorentina	3
Bologna	2
Cagliari	2
Como	1
Empoli	1
Genoa	1
Hellas Verona	1
Palermo	1
Sampdoria	1
