= Antonio Di Natale =

Italian footballer (born 1977)

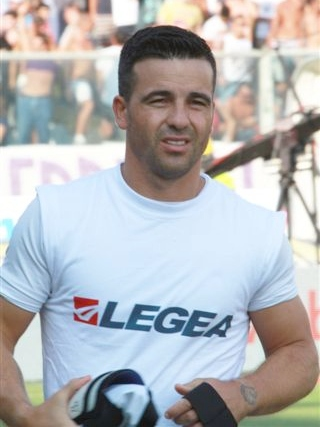
- Di Natale in 2012

Personal information
- Full name: Antonio Di Natale
- Date of birth: 13 October 1977 (age 49)
- Place of birth: Naples, Italy
- Height: 1.70 m (5 ft 7 in)
- Position: Striker

Youth career
- 1994–1997: Empoli

Senior career*
Years	Team	Apps	(Gls)
1995–2004	Empoli	158	(49)
1997–1998	→ Iperzola (loan)	33	(6)
1998	→ Varese (loan)	5	(0)
1998–1999	→ Viareggio (loan)	25	(12)
2004–2016	Udinese	385	(191)
Total		606	(258)

International career
2002–2012	Italy	42	(11)

Managerial career
- 2021–2022: Carrarese
Medal record
Men's Football
Representing Italy
UEFA European Championship
Runner-up	2012 Poland–Ukraine
- * Club domestic league appearances and goals

Antonio Di Natale (Italian pronunciation: [anˈtɔːnjo (toˈtɔ d)di naˈtaːle]; born 13 October 1977) is an Italian football coach and former professional player who played as a striker.

After being a member of the Empoli youth side since 1994, Di Natale started his professional career with the Empoli senior side in 1995, and remained with the club until 2004, aside from brief loan spells with Iperzola, Varese and Viareggio. During his time with Empoli, he helped the club to achieve Serie A promotion during the 2001–02 Serie B season, scoring 16 goals. His breakthrough came during the 2002–03 Serie A season, as he scored 13 goals in the league and helped Empoli avoid relegation. Despite being unable to find the net as regularly or save Empoli from relegation the following season, his performances and consistent goalscoring earned him a transfer to Udinese in 2004.

During his time with Udinese, Di Natale's skill, leadership and ability to both score and create many goals played a key role in helping the club to third and fourth-place finishes in Serie A and qualify for the UEFA Champions League. In 2007, he was named the club's captain. Di Natale's consistent goal-scoring with Udinese saw him reach double figures for nine consecutive league seasons. He won the Serie A top goalscorer award in 2010 and 2011, and was also awarded the Serie A Italian Footballer of the Year award for his performances in 2010. A late bloomer, unlike most strikers, he enjoyed his most prolific seasons in front of goal well after age 30; between 2009 and 2011, Lionel Messi (82) and Cristiano Ronaldo (86) were the only two players to have scored more league goals than Di Natale (67). In 2015, France Football rated him as one of the ten-best footballers in the world who are over age 36.

Di Natale is Udinese's top appearance holder and goal-scorer in Serie A with 191 goals in 385 appearances, and in UEFA club competitions, with 17 goals in 37 appearances. With 209 goals, he is also the sixth-highest goal-scorer in Serie A, and with 311 goals, he is the eighth-highest scoring Italian player in all competitions, behind Silvio Piola, Alessandro Del Piero, Giuseppe Meazza, Luca Toni, Roberto Baggio, Francesco Totti and Filippo Inzaghi.

At international level, Di Natale represented the Italy national team 42 times between 2002 and 2012, scoring 11 goals. With Italy, he participated in UEFA Euro 2008; the 2010 FIFA World Cup, where he scored one goal; and at Euro 2012, where he also scored a goal as Italy reached the final of the tournament.

== Early life ==
Also known as "Totò", Di Natale was born in Naples on 13 October 1977 to Salvatore, a professional painter, and Giovanna. He has two brothers, Paolo and Carmine, and two sisters, Michela and Anna. He grew up in the 219 district of Pomigliano d'Arco. His beginnings at the "San Nicola" football school in Castello di Cisterna, affiliated with Empoli Football Club, led him to join the youth sector of the Tuscan club at the age of 13 in 1990.

== Club career ==
=== Empoli ===
Despite being born in Naples, Di Natale made the move north for his footballing career, joining Empoli's youth system. While at Empoli, he was loaned out three times, enjoying success with Viareggio in the 1998–99 campaign, where he scored 12 goals in 25 games for the Tuscan side. Upon his return to his parent club, he finally made his breakthrough into the first team squad and established himself as an integral member of the side. He scored 6 goals in 25 appearances for Empoli during the 1999–2000 campaign as Empoli finished in ninth place in Serie B.

Empoli won promotion to the Serie A in 2002 after finishing in fourth place during the 2001–02 Serie B season with 67 points. They finished with 60 goals, the largest tally in the competition, and Di Natale finished as the club's top goalscorer with 16 league goals. In Empoli's first season back in the topflight, he helped the club fight off relegation by scoring 13 times in the league. This included a hat-trick in Empoli's 4–2 defeat of Reggina on 17 November 2002. The next season was less fortunate for Di Natale, who only scored five goals in the league. Following two seasons in the Serie A, Empoli were relegated back to the Serie B at the end of the 2003–04 campaign.

=== Udinese ===
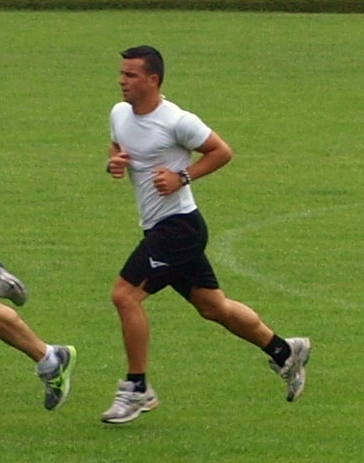
Di Natale training with Udinese

After Empoli were relegated, Di Natale joined Udinese for the 2004–05 Serie A season, along with Manuel Belleri and Emílson Cribari. In Udine, he partnered with Vincenzo Iaquinta and David Di Michele in attack, and the Friulian club finished fourth place at the end of the season and qualified for the UEFA Champions League for the following year. In his debut season with Udinese, Di Natale played 33 league games and scored 7 league goals.

In the 2007–08 season, Di Natale scored 17 league goals. The two most notable goals were scored on matchday 4, when Udinese played against Reggina. Forming a formidable attacking duo with Fabio Quagliarella, Di Natale improved his goal tally, becoming the focal point of the attack. In 2007, he was named captain of Udinese and his contract was extended to 30 June 2012.

May 2010 saw the conclusion of Di Natale's best-ever season, scoring 29 goals in Serie A, and contributing 54% of Udinese's total goals. He also surpassed Oliver Bierhoff's club record for most league goals in a season, who had scored 28. A brace against Bari on 9 May 2010 saw Di Natale surpass the 100-goal mark in Serie A. For his performances, he was voted Serie A Italian Footballer of the Year and finished as the top scorer in Serie A. He also received the Serie A Fair Play award for interrupting play in a match while Lazio's Libor Kozák was injured, with Udinese down 3–2 late in the match. The 2009–10 season saw Di Natale finish as runner-up for the European Golden Shoe with Chelsea striker Didier Drogba on 29 goals, five behind Barcelona forward Lionel Messi. He also helped the club to reach the semi-finals of the Coppa Italia that season.

On 14 November 2010, Di Natale scored a hat-trick during a match against Lecce and on 28 November, he scored a second consecutive home hat-trick during a match against Napoli. On 8 May 2011, he struck two first-half goals to give Udinese a 2–1 victory over Lazio and into fourth place with two matches remaining to play. Despite him missing a late penalty, with a 0–0 draw against champions Milan on the final day, Udinese secured fourth place and a spot in the playoff round of the 2011–12 UEFA Champions League. During the 2010–11 season, Di Natale had the best strike rate of any player in Italy, scoring 28 goals in 36 matches for a strike rate of 0.78 goals per match. This was also the third-best strike rate in Europe, behind Real Madrid's Cristiano Ronaldo and Barcelona's Lionel Messi.

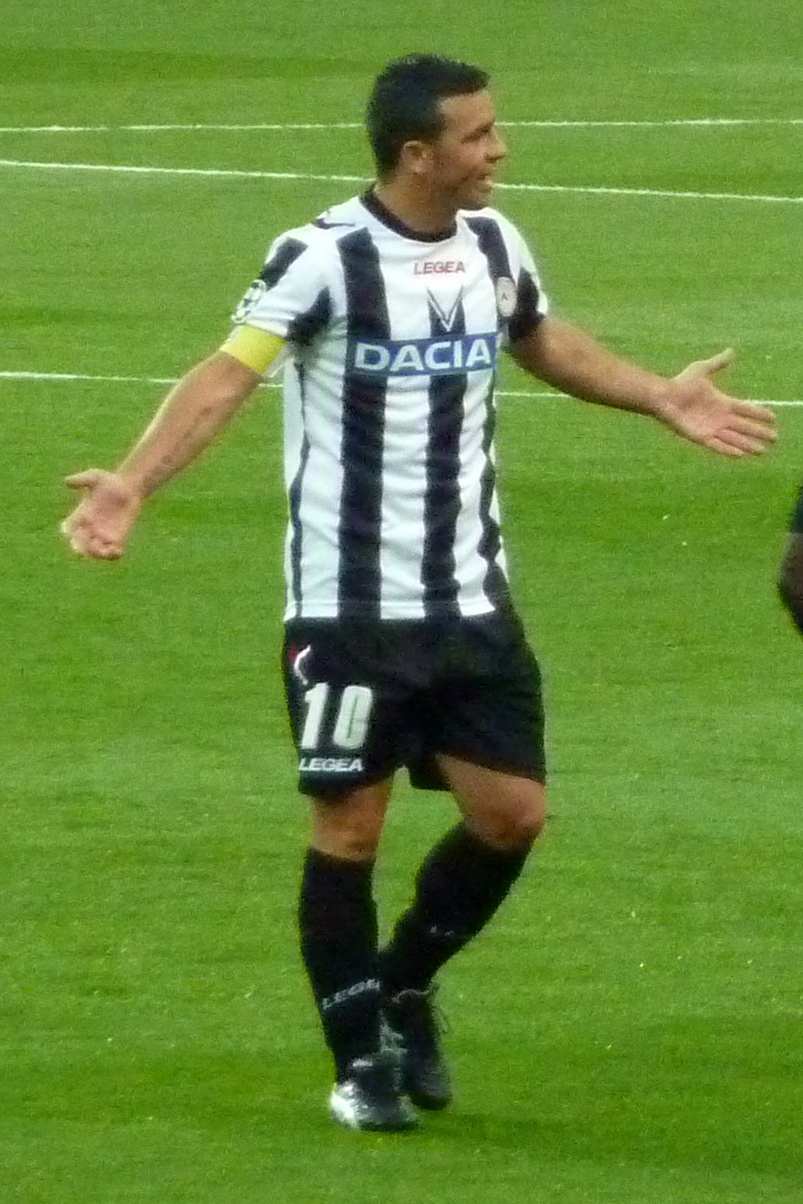
Di Natale playing for Udinese in 2011

On 23 October 2011, Di Natale scored a brace in a 3–0 defeat of Novara which sent Udinese to the top of the Serie A table. On 13 May 2012, he opened the scoring against Catania on the final matchday of the Serie A season, and Diego Fabbrini added a second-half strike to secure four-straight Serie A victories and ensure Udinese a place in next season's UEFA Champions League qualifying round. On 4 July 2012, Di Natale signed a new two-year contract with the club.

Di Natale's first goal of the 2012–13 season came on 16 September 2012 when he scored Udinese's second goal within five minutes of the start of the match, but a red card to Andrea Lazzari and two late goals from Siena condemned Udinese to a 2–2 draw. On 6 January 2013, he scored a brace as Udinese defeated ten-man Internazionale 3–0, lifting Udinese to eighth in the table. In Udinese's next league match, on 13 January, he scored two more goals as his side defeated Fiorentina 3–1 to extend their streak of five unbeaten Serie A matches. Di Natale scored his 150th Serie A goal for Udinese on 3 March, converting from close range after a cross from Luis Muriel, securing a 0–1 victory at Pescara. His last goal of the 2012–13 campaign came on the final matchday, on 19 May 2013, scoring Udinese's winning goal in a 5–2 defeat of Internazionale, confirming the club's place in the UEFA Europa League for the following season.

Before the 2013–14 season Di Natale was offered a contract with an annual salary of €10 million by Chinese club Guangzhou Evergrande, which was coached by his former Italy manager Marcello Lippi at the time. However, Di Natale declined the offer and chose to stay with Udinese. After Udinese's 3–1 loss to Hellas Verona on 6 January 2014, he told Sky Sports Italia he would retire at the end of the 2013–14 season. "I have already decided, in June I'll stop playing football. It's already established." On 8 March 2014, Di Natale scored his 185th Serie A goal, the winning strike in Udinese's 1–0 victory over Milan, to overtake Gabriel Batistuta on the all-time Serie A scoring charts. He ended the 2013–14 season with 17 goals, making him the fourth-top goalscorer in Serie A, at age 36. Despite previously announcing he would retire from professional football at the end of the 2013–14 Serie A season, he confirmed on 30 May 2014 he had decided he would not retire and would continue to play on into the 2014–15 season.

Di Natale scored four goals in a 5–1 win over Ternana in the third round of the Coppa Italia on 23 August 2014. On 31 August, in Udinese's opening Serie A match of the 2014–15 season, he scored two second half goals in a home win over newly promoted Empoli. On 23 November 2014, he scored his 200th goal in his 400th appearance in Serie A. On 2 February 2015, he was offered an $8 million contract by a yet unnamed team in Major League Soccer (MLS); he had been linked to MLS expansion club New York City FC. On 28 April, Di Natale scored his 205th goal in Serie A, matching Italian legend Roberto Baggio as the sixth-highest goalscorer in Serie A history, at age 37; this was also his 700th career appearance. The following matchday, on 3 May, he scored in a 1–0 victory over Hellas Verona, overtaking Baggio with his 206th goal in Serie A. On 12 May, he once again took back his decision to retire at the end of the 2014–15 season, announcing his intention to play another season. In late April 2016, Di Natale said he would leave the club at the end of the 2015–16 season, although he also said he intended to continue playing professional football. On 15 May 2016, he scored a goal from the penalty spot in a 2–1 home defeat to Carpi in his final appearance with Udinese, scoring a total of 191 goals in 385 league appearances during his 12 years with the club, and 227 goals and 63 assists for the club in all competitions. He officially announced his retirement later that year.

== International career ==
=== Early years ===
Di Natale made his debut with the Italy national team on 20 November 2002, under manager Giovanni Trapattoni, in a friendly match against Turkey. He won a few caps in later years, scoring his first goal on 18 February 2004 in a friendly match against the Czech Republic, a game which ended in a 2–2 draw.

=== Euro 2008 ===
In 2006, Di Natale regained a spot with the Azzurri under new manager Roberto Donadoni and was involved in the UEFA Euro 2008 qualification campaign. He was then called up to the Euro 2008 tournament proper, where he missed a crucial penalty during the quarter-final penalty shoot-out against Spain, who went on to win 4–2 on penalties and later the tournament. Di Natale missed the 2009 FIFA Confederations Cup due to a knee injury, which he incurred on 28 March 2009 in an international match against Montenegro.

=== 2010 World Cup ===
Di Natale participated in the 2010 FIFA World Cup under manager Marcello Lippi, and was assigned the number ten shirt. Italy was placed into Group F at the finals, drawing their first two group stage matches by a score of 1–1 to Paraguay and New Zealand, respectively. In their final group match on 24 June, he scored a goal in the 3–2 defeat against Slovakia, which resulted in Italy finishing bottom of its group and going out in the first round.

=== Euro 2012 ===
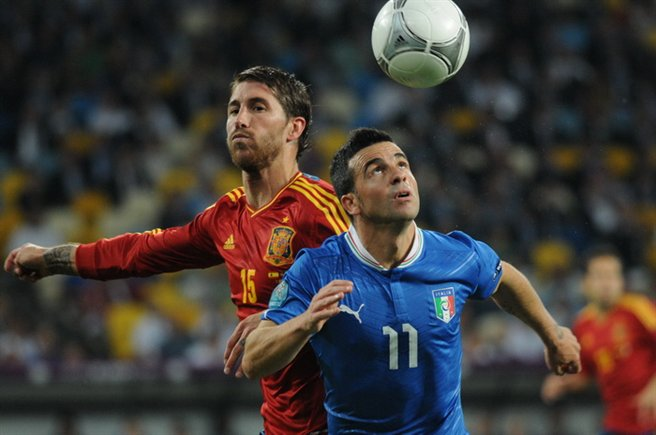
Di Natale (right) playing for Italy during the UEFA Euro 2012 Final

In 2012, Di Natale was included in the Italy squad for Euro 2012, under manager Cesare Prandelli, making five appearances throughout the tournament, appearing in every match save the quarter-final against England. After coming on as a substitute in the first match against defending champions Spain, on 10 June 2012, he scored the opening goal in a 1–1 draw, curling a right-footed shot past goalkeeper Iker Casillas after receiving a through-ball from Andrea Pirlo; this was the only goal that Spain conceded throughout the entire tournament. Italy eventually reached the final of the tournament, which was played on 1 July 2012, at the Olympic Stadium in Kyiv. The Italians suffered a 4–0 defeat to Spain, with Di Natale making a substitute appearance during the match.

Following the tournament, Di Natale retired from international football. Although Prandelli called him up for the 2013 FIFA Confederations Cup, Di Natale turned down the offer, as he was exhausted from the regular season and wanted to do well in the next season so that he would be called up to play on the Italian team at the 2014 FIFA World Cup. However, he was not called up for that tournament the following summer. In total, he scored 11 goals in 42 matches for the Azzurri.

== Style of play ==
Di Natale was capable of playing anywhere along the front line; throughout his career he was deployed in the centre as a lone striker, out wide on the left in an attacking trident, or even in a supporting role, due to his positional sense, vision and ability to both score and create goals. He was mainly known for his pace, control, flair, technical skills and sense of space in the area, as well as his ability to make attacking runs to beat the defensive line and subsequently finish off chances. Due to his opportunism, composure in front of the goal, and ability to strike the ball well with either foot despite being naturally right-footed, he was able to score from any position on the pitch.

Regarded as one of the best Italian forwards of his generation, Di Natale earned the Serie A Capocannoniere award as Serie A's top goalscorer for the 2009–10 and 2010–11 seasons, also winning the AIC Serie A Italian Footballer of the Year award in 2010. In addition to his skill and goalscoring ability, Di Natale also stood out for his leadership, loyalty and work-rate throughout his career. He was also an accurate free-kick and penalty taker.

== Coaching career ==
On 4 September 2018, Di Natale was hired by Spezia as technical collaborator for the first team. He was subsequently put in charge of the club's Under-17 youth team in July 2019, a role he left in September 2020.

On 11 April 2021, Di Natale was named new head coach of Serie C club Carrarese, in what represented his first managerial role in his career, taking over from Silvio Baldini, a former manager of his during his days at Empoli. After guiding Carrarese to safety in his short stint in charge of the club in the 2020–21 season, Di Natale signed a two-year deal to remain in charge of the Tuscanian club. After completing the 2021–22 Serie C with the Apuani, on 11 July 2022 Di Natale mutually rescinded his contract with Carrarese.

== Personal life ==
While playing for Empoli, at age 19 Di Natale met his future wife, Ilenia Betti, whom he married on 15 June 2002. The couple have two children together, Filippo and Diletta. In August 2010, he rejected a transfer to Italian giants Juventus because his children had grown up in Udine and his family was settled and enjoyed living there.

Di Natale took financial responsibility for the disabled sister of Udinese teammate Piermario Morosini, who died on 14 April 2012 when he suffered a sudden cardiac arrest while playing on loan for Livorno. Morosini's death left his sister with no other living relatives.

== Career statistics ==
=== Club ===
Appearances and goals by club, season and competition
Club	Season	League			Coppa Italia		Europe		Total	
Club	Season	Division	Apps	Goals	Apps	Goals	Apps	Goals	Apps	Goals
Empoli	1996–97	Serie B	1	0	—		—		1	0
Empoli	1999–2000	Serie B	25	6	5	1	—		30	7
Empoli	2000–01	Serie B	35	9	3	1	—		38	10
Empoli	2001–02	Serie B	38	16	4	2	—		42	18
Empoli	2002–03	Serie A	27	13	5	1	—		32	14
Empoli	2003–04	Serie A	33	5	2	1	—		35	6
Empoli	Total		158	49	19	6	—		177	55
Iperzola (loan)	1997–98	Serie C2	33	6	—		—		33	6
Varese (loan)	1998–99	Serie C1	4	0	—		—		4	0
Viareggio (loan)	1998–99	Serie C2	25	12	—		—		25	12
Udinese	2004–05	Serie A	33	7	6	4	2 (Note: Appearances in UEFA Cup)	0	41	11
Udinese	2005–06	Serie A	35	8	3	3	10 (Note: Eight appearances and three goals in UEFA Champions League, two appearances and one goal in UEFA Cup)	4	48	15
Udinese	2006–07	Serie A	31	11	2	2	—		33	13
Udinese	2007–08	Serie A	36	17	1	1	—		37	18
Udinese	2008–09	Serie A	22	12	1	1	7	3	30	16
Udinese	2009–10	Serie A	35	29	3	0	—		38	29
Udinese	2010–11	Serie A	36	28	1	0	—		37	28
Udinese	2011–12	Serie A	36	23	1	1	6 (Note: Two appearances and one goal in UEFA Champions League, four appearances and four goals in UEFA Europa League)	5	43	29
Udinese	2012–13	Serie A	33	23	1	0	8 (Note: Two appearances in UEFA Champions League, six appearances and three goals in UEFA Europa League)	3	42	26
Udinese	2013–14	Serie A	32	17	2	1	4 (Note: Appearances in UEFA Europa League)	2	38	20
Udinese	2014–15	Serie A	33	14	1	4	—		34	18
Udinese	2015–16	Serie A	23	2	2	2	—		25	4
Udinese	Total		385	191	24	19	37	17	446	227
Career total			606	258	43	25	37	17	686	300

=== International ===
Appearances and goals by national team and year
National team	Year	Apps	Goals
Italy	2002	1	0
Italy	2003	2	0
Italy	2004	1	1
Italy	2005	0	0
Italy	2006	4	1
Italy	2007	7	3
Italy	2008	10	4
Italy	2009	5	0
Italy	2010	6	1
Italy	2011	0	0
Italy	2012	6	1
Total		42	11

Scores and results list Italy's goal tally first, score column indicates score after each Di Natale goal.

List of international goals scored by Antonio Di Natale
#	Date	Venue	Opponent	Score	Result	Competition
1.	18 February 2004	Stadio Renzo Barbera, Palermo	Czech Republic	2–1	2–2	Friendly
2.	15 November 2006	Stadio Atleti Azzurri d'Italia, Bergamo	Turkey	1–0	1–1	Friendly
3.	22 August 2007	Ferenc Puskás Stadium, Budapest	Hungary	1–0	1–3	Friendly
4.	12 September 2007	Olympic Stadium, Kyiv	Ukraine	1–0	2–1	UEFA Euro 2008 qualifying
5.	12 September 2007	Olympic Stadium, Kyiv	Ukraine	2–1	2–1	UEFA Euro 2008 qualifying
6.	30 May 2008	Stadio Artemio Franchi, Florence	Belgium	1–0	3–1	Friendly
7.	30 May 2008	Stadio Artemio Franchi, Florence	Belgium	2–0	3–1	Friendly
8.	6 September 2008	Antonis Papadopoulos Stadium, Larnaca	Cyprus	1–0	2–1	2010 FIFA World Cup qualification
9.	6 September 2008	Antonis Papadopoulos Stadium, Larnaca	Cyprus	2–1	2–1	2010 FIFA World Cup qualification
10.	24 June 2010	Ellis Park Stadium, Johannesburg	Slovakia	1–2	2–3	2010 FIFA World Cup
11.	10 June 2012	PGE Arena Gdańsk, Gdańsk	Spain	1–0	1–1	UEFA Euro 2012

=== Managerial statistics ===
As of 11 July 2022

Team	Nat	From	To	Record				
Team	Nat	From	To	G	W	D	L	Win %
Carrarese	(Italy)	11 April 2021	11 July 2022	43	11	17	15	25.58
Total				43	11	17	15	25.58

== Honours ==
Empoli

- Coppa Italia Serie C: 1995–96

Italy

- UEFA European Championship runner-up: 2012

Individual

- Capocannoniere: 2009–10, 2010–11
- Serie A Italian Footballer of the Year: 2010
- Serie A Fair Play Prize: 2010
- Pallone d'Argento: 2011
- Premio Nazionale Carriera Esemplare "Gaetano Scirea": 2011
- Serie A Goalscorer of the Year: 2011
- Serie A Team of the Year: 2010–11, 2011–12, 2012–13
- Coppa Italia top scorer: 2014–15

== See also ==
- List of Serie A all-time top goal scorers
