= Serie A Italian Footballer of the Year =

Sports award

AIC Serie A Italian Footballer of the Year
- Sport: Association football
- Competition: Serie A
- Awarded for: Italian player considered to have performed the best in each given Serie A season
- Local name: Migliore calciatore italiano AIC (Italian)
- Country: Italy
- Presented by: Italian Footballers' Association (AIC)

History
- First award: 1997
- Editions: 14
- Final award: 2010
- First winner: Roberto Mancini (1997)
- Most wins: Francesco Totti (5 times)
- Most recent: Antonio Di Natale (2010)
- Website: Official website

The AIC Serie A Italian Footballer of the Year (Italian: Migliore calciatore italiano AIC) was a yearly award organized by the Italian Footballers' Association (AIC) given to the Italian footballer who was considered to have performed the best over the previous Serie A season. The award was part of the Oscar del Calcio awards event.

== Winners ==
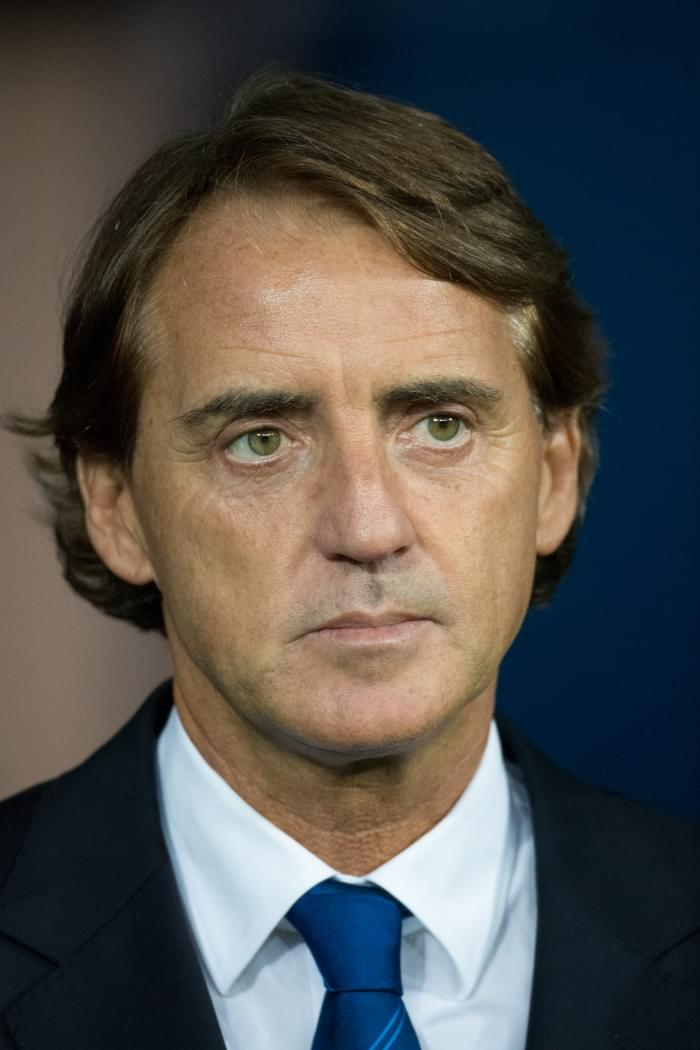
Roberto Mancini won the inaugural award in 1997.

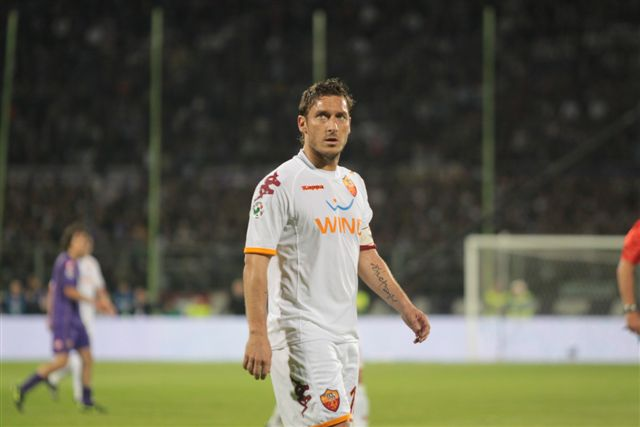
Francesco Totti has won the award a record of five times, all while at Roma.

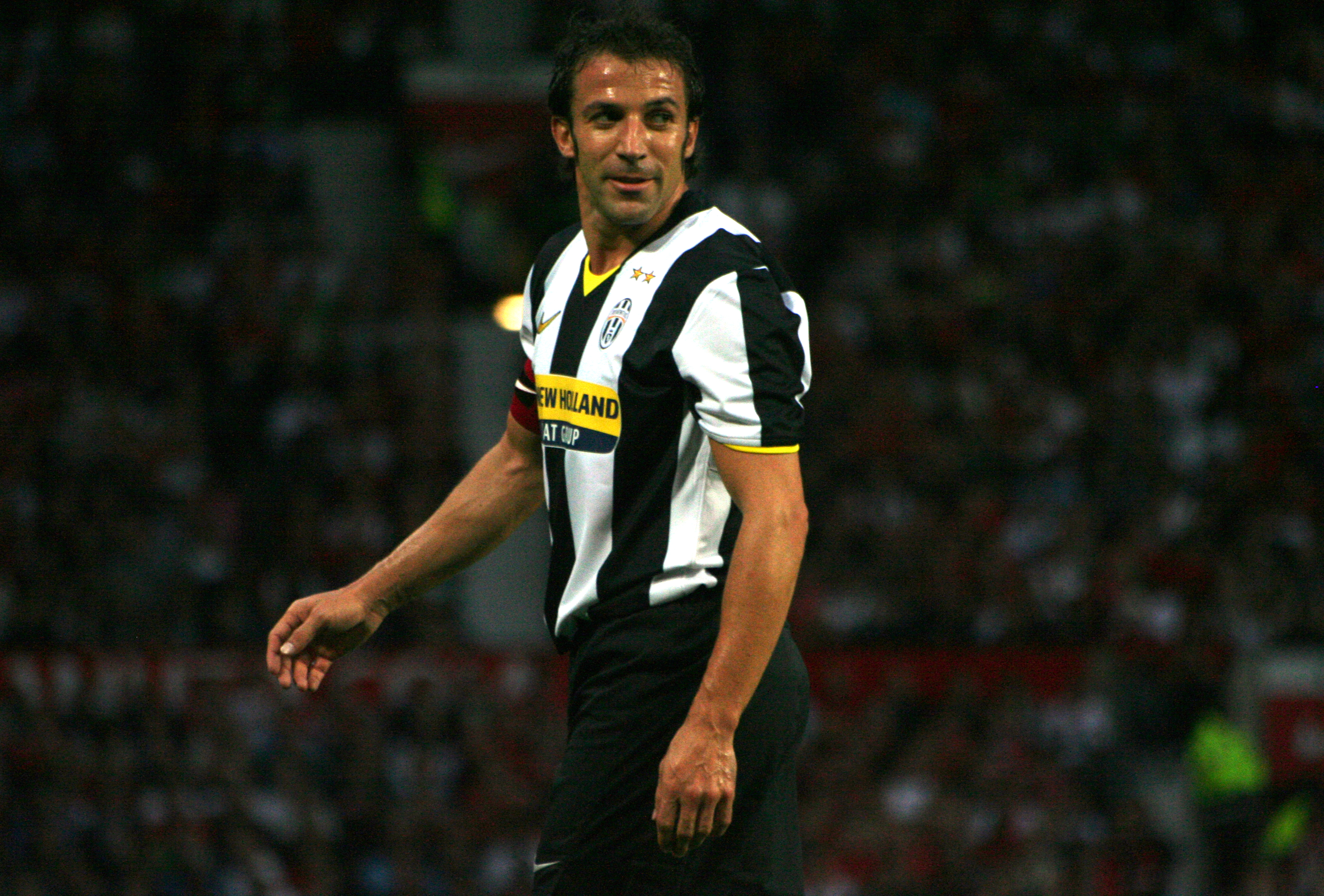
Alessandro Del Piero won the award twice, in 1998 and 2008 – he is the player with the longest period between two awards, 10 years.

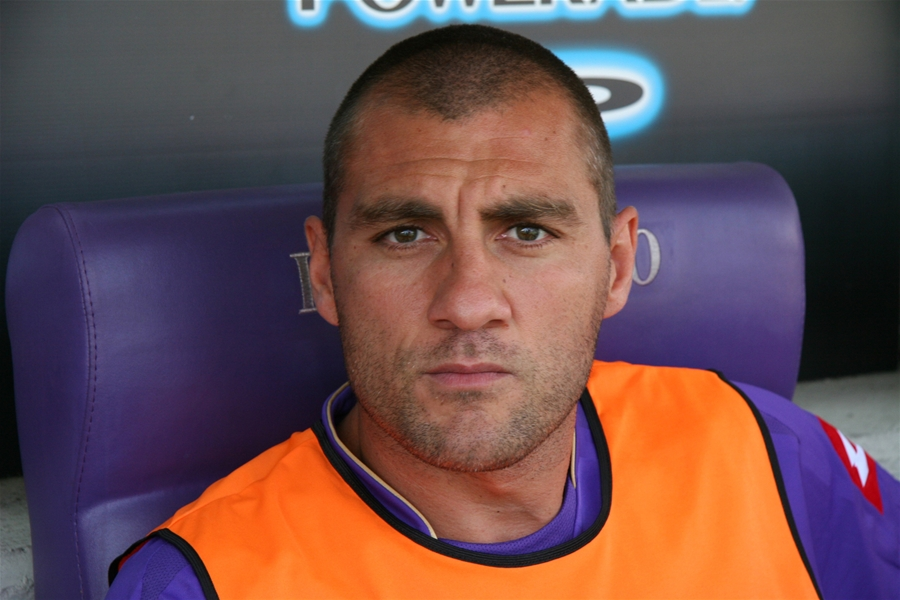
Christian Vieri was a winner for two different clubs.

Key
‡	Indicates player won the FIFA World Player of the Year in the same season
§	Denotes the club were Serie A champions in the same season

Season	Player	Club	Ref(s)
1997	Roberto Mancini	Sampdoria	
1998	Alessandro Del Piero	Juventus^{§}	
1999	Christian Vieri	Lazio	
2000	Francesco Totti	Roma	
2001	Francesco Totti (2)	Roma^{§}	
2002	Christian Vieri (2)	Internazionale	
2003	Francesco Totti (3)	Roma	
2004	Francesco Totti (4)	Roma	
2005	Alberto Gilardino	Parma	
2006	Fabio Cannavaro^{‡} (Note: Cannavaro was signed by Real Madrid from Juventus midway through 2006.)	Juventus	
2007	Francesco Totti (5)	Roma	
2008	Alessandro Del Piero (2)	Juventus	
2009	Daniele De Rossi	Roma	
2010	Antonio Di Natale	Udinese	

=== By club ===
Club	Players	Total
Roma	2	6
Juventus	2	3
Internazionale	1	1
Lazio	1	1
Parma	1	1
Sampdoria	1	1
Udinese	1	1

=== By position ===
Position	Players	Total
Forward	6	12
Midfielder	1	1
Defender	1	1

== See also ==
- Serie A Footballer of the Year
