= Andrea Barzagli =

Italian footballer (born 1981)

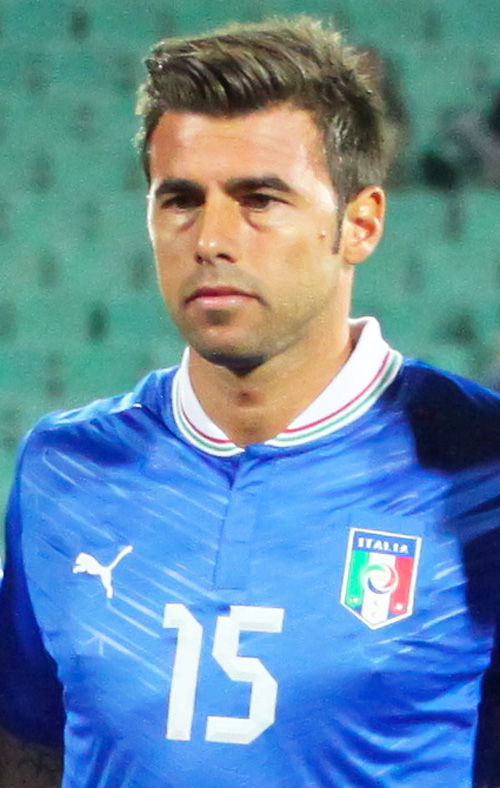
- Barzagli with Italy in 2012

Personal information
- Full name: Andrea Barzagli
- Date of birth: 8 May 1981 (age 45)
- Place of birth: Fiesole, Italy
- Height: 1.87 m (6 ft 2 in)
- Position: Centre-back

Team information
- Current team: Italy U21 (assistant)

Youth career
- Rondinella

Senior career*
Years	Team	Apps	(Gls)
1998–2000	Rondinella	51	(3)
2000	Pistoiese	5	(0)
2001	Rondinella	13	(1)
2001–2003	Piacenza	0	(0)
2001–2003	→ Ascoli (loan)	46	(3)
2003–2004	Chievo	29	(3)
2004–2008	Palermo	142	(3)
2008–2011	VfL Wolfsburg	75	(1)
2011–2019	Juventus	206	(2)
Total		567	(16)

International career
2003–2004	Italy U21	15	(0)
2004–2017	Italy	73	(0)
Medal record
Men's football
Representing Italy
FIFA World Cup
Winner	2006 Germany
UEFA European Championship
Runner-up	2012 Poland–Ukraine
FIFA Confederations Cup
Third place	2013 Brazil
Summer Olympics
Bronze medal – third place	2004 Athens
UEFA European Under-21 Championship
Winner	2004 Germany
- * Club domestic league appearances and goals

Andrea Barzagli Ufficiale OMRI (Italian pronunciation: [anˈdrɛːa barˈtsaʎʎi, -ˈdza-]; born 8 May 1981) is an Italian former professional footballer who played as a centre-back. He was selected to the Serie A Team of the Year four times.

After playing for several smaller Italian clubs in the lower divisions of Italian football in his early career, he made his Serie A debut with Chievo in 2003, and eventually came to prominence while playing for Palermo. In 2008, he was signed by German side VfL Wolfsburg, where he remained for two and a half seasons, winning a Bundesliga title in 2009. In 2011, he returned to Italy, joining Juventus, where he later won eight consecutive Serie A titles between 2012 and 2019, among other trophies, including a record of four consecutive Coppa Italia titles between 2015 and 2018; having also played two UEFA Champions League finals between 2015 and 2017.

At international level, he represented the Italy national football team on 73 occasions between 2004 and 2017, taking part at the 2004 Summer Olympic Games where he obtained a bronze medal, at two FIFA World Cups (2006 and 2014), three UEFA European Championships (2008, 2012, and 2016), and at the 2013 FIFA Confederations Cup, where himself and the team also won bronze. He was most notably a member of the Italian 2006 World Cup winning squad, as well as a starting member of the Italian squad that reached the UEFA Euro 2012 final.

== Club career ==
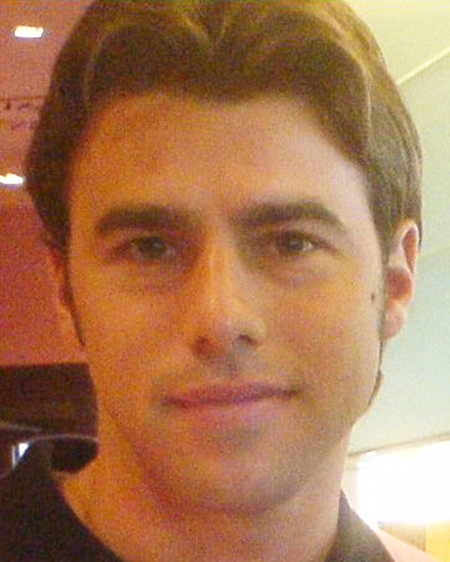
Barzagli in 2007

=== Early career in Italy ===
In the 1998–99 season, Barzagli made his first professional football appearance with semi-professional Rondinella before moving to Serie B side Pistoiese in 2000–01, in a co-ownership deal. He initially played as a midfielder, before being moved to defence by manager Giuseppe Pillon. A year later he rejoined Rondinella Calcio in Serie C2. He then signed for Ascoli for the 2001–02 season (from Piacenza, a Serie A side from 2001 to 2003) and helped them gain promotion to Serie B. He remained in Ascoli for another year without further success. In July 2003 he was sold by Piacenza in another co-ownership deal. He made his Serie A debut with Chievo in a 1–1 draw at Brescia on 31 August 2003.

On 20 July 2004, Barzagli was signed by Serie A outfit Palermo, helping the club to an UEFA Cup spot during his first season with the club. He was bestowed with the captain's armband after Eugenio Corini controversially left the Sicilian club in the summer of the 2007–08 season.

=== Wolfsburg ===
In 2008, Barzagli was in contract negotiations with Fiorentina and was widely expected to sign. To everyone's surprise the deal fell through as Barzagli, a native Florentine, had already stated his eagerness to join. Barzagli's agent spoke to media saying: "The difference between what we were asking and what they offered was minimal – it amounted to £100,000. Andrea was willing to give up a lot of money to play for Fiorentina, but they didn't take our requests into consideration". Instead Barzagli choose to join VfL Wolfsburg and the Bundesliga following fellow Italian and teammate Cristian Zaccardo. He was given the number 43. It was later reported that the Italian international snubbed Fiorentina's five-year £1.2 million contract for VfL Wolfsburg's three-year offer of £2.5 million. The official transfer fee was €12.95 million. Barzagli played every minute of the 2008–09 Bundesliga championship winning season for Wolfsburg. He later credited his Wolfsburg coach during the 2008–09 season, Felix Magath, for having helped him to improve as a footballer and for instilling a stronger mentality and work ethic in him. On 15 September 2009, he made his UEFA Champions League debut in Wolfsburg's 3–1 home win over CSKA Moscow. He scored his first goal for Wolfsburg in a 4–0 win over TSG Hoffenheim on 4 April 2010. He closed his second season at Wolfsburg with two appearances in the Champions League and three in the Europa League, as well as 1 goal in 24 league appearances. In his third season with the German club, he collected 17 league appearances before moving to Juventus in January.

=== Juventus ===
==== 2011–2014 ====
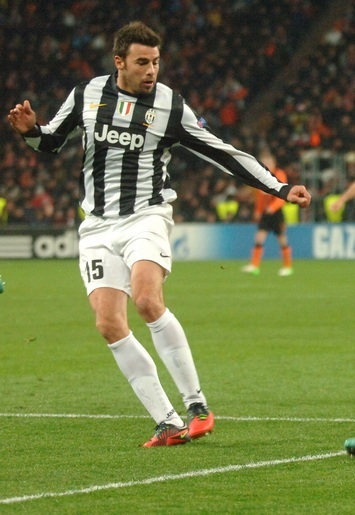
Barzagli playing for Juventus in 2012

On 26 January 2011, Barzagli left Wolfsburg to return to Italy, joining Serie A giants Juventus for a contract of €300,000 fixed and €300,000 variable, which would keep him at the club until 2013. Barzagli's contract with Wolfsburg was due to expire on 30 June 2011. He made his debut with the Turin club in a 2–1 away defeat against his former team Palermo, on the 23rd match-day of the season on 2 February 2011. His first six months with the Bianconeri coincided with the second half of a terribly disappointing 2010–11 campaign under Luigi Delneri, which saw the club finish only seventh in Serie A, with Barzagli making 15 appearances in the league that season.

With the arrival of Antonio Conte as the new Juventus coach, Barzagli became an integral part of the Juventus backline, and was one of the club's most consistent performers, culminating in a recall to the national team. Juventus finished the 2011–12 season with the best defence in Italy and in Europe, only conceding 20 goals in 38 appearances. Barzagli scored his first goal for Juventus on 13 May 2012, scoring a penalty against Atalanta in the last league match of the season, in a 3–1 home win. He helped Juventus win the 2011–12 scudetto undefeated, and the 2012 Supercoppa Italiana; Juventus also made the final of the Coppa Italia that season. His stellar season earned him a place in the Serie A Team of the Year. At the end of the season, he renewed his contract with Juventus until 2015.

During the 2012–13 season, Barzagli made a total of 45 appearances in all competitions for Juventus, his highest personal tally since his first season at Wolfsburg. Most of these were made alongside Leonardo Bonucci and Giorgio Chiellini in Antonio Conte's now typical three-man backline and 3–5–2 formation, as the club again prevailed in Serie A, winning their second consecutive title, and made their way to the quarter-finals of the Champions League and the semi-finals of the Coppa Italia; due to their performances together, the three-man defence earned the nickname BBC, a reference to the players' initials, and soon the trio established themselves as one of the best defences in world football during the following seasons. Although Barzagli did not score during the 2012–13 season, he impressed, however, in the home fixture against Roma in September 2012, when he won the ball in his own half, ran past an opponent with a "sombrero", and made a lung-bursting run that culminated in a through-ball assist for Sebastian Giovinco, as Juventus won the match 4–1.

In the 2013–14 season, Barzagli's consistent performances continued for Juventus, despite having dealt with injury problems throughout the season. Juventus won the 2013 Supercoppa Italiana and their third consecutive Serie A title, their thirtieth overall, with a record 102 points, finishing again with the best defence in the League. Juventus disappointed in Europe, however, and were eliminated in the group stage of the Champion's League, although they managed to reach the semi-finals of the Europa League that season.

==== 2014–2019 ====
After the 2014 World Cup, Barzagli endured an injury and was operated in Finland on 1 July 2014, being ruled out for three months. Barzagli missed the entire first half of the 2014–15 season, and only returned to the starting line-up in a friendly match with the youth side. He was called up for the first leg of Juventus's semi-final match-up against Fiorentina in the Coppa Italia. He made his first appearance for Juventus since his injury eight months before, coming on as a substitute in Juventus's 1–0 home win over Sassuolo on 9 March 2015. Barzagli started the next league game on 14 March 2015, helping Juventus to keep a clean sheet in a 1–0 away win over Palermo.

On 2 May 2015, Barzagli helped Juventus keep a clean sheet in a 1–0 away victory over Sampdoria, which allowed the Turin club to clinch the Serie A title for a fourth consecutive season. On 20 May, he featured in Juventus's 2–1 victory over Lazio in the 2015 Coppa Italia final, as Juventus completed a domestic double that season; this was also the club's record tenth Coppa Italia title. On 6 June, Barzagli started for Juventus in the 2015 UEFA Champions League final, ahead of his injured defensive teammate Chiellini, but were defeated 3–1 by Barcelona at Berlin's Olympiastadion.

On 25 July, Barzagli sustained a thigh strain, and was initially ruled out for three weeks, meaning that he would miss the 2015 Supercoppa Italiana; however, he was able to recover in time to start the match as Juventus defeated Lazio 2–0 on 8 August to claim a record seventh Supercoppa Italiana title.

During the beginning of the 2015–16 season, Barzagli demonstrated his versatility by filling in for the recovering Stephan Lichtsteiner as a rightback; in this position, he made a series of impressive performances, including an assist for Álvaro Morata's opening goal in a 2–0 home win over Sevilla in the Champions League group stage on 30 September, which earned him the Juventus Player of the Month Award for October. On 8 November, Barzagli made his 300th Serie A appearance in a 3–1 away win over Empoli. On 6 March 2016, Barzagli scored his second ever goal for the club since the 2011–12 season in a 2–0 away win over Atalanta; coincidentally, his first goal for the club also came against Atalanta, 91 games earlier. On 8 May, he made his 150th Serie A appearance for Juventus in a 2–1 away defeat to Verona; this was his 30th league appearance of the season, and his 40th in all competitions, the most he had totalled since the 2012–13 season. After helping Juventus to a fifth consecutive Serie A title, on 11 May, Barzagli extended his contract with the club until the end of the 2017–18 season.

On 6 November 2016, Barzagli dislocated his shoulder in the fifth minute of play against Chievo after falling awkwardly and was stretchered off the pitch and taken to hospital. Tests the following day estimated he would be out for two months. He returned to action sooner than expected on 17 December, coming on as a substitute in the 68th minute of a 1–0 home win over Roma.

On 3 June 2017, Barzagli started in his second Champions League final in three years with Juventus, but they were defeated 4–1 by defending champions Real Madrid.

On 29 June 2018, Barzagli extended his contract with Juventus for one season. After initially struggling with injuries early on in the season, he returned to the starting line-up for the club's league fixture on 26 September, and made his 200th Serie A appearance with Juventus during the match, captaining the team in a 2–0 home win over Bologna. On 23 October, he made his 50th UEFA Champions League appearance (excluding qualifying rounds), coming on as a late substitute for Juan Cuadrado in a 1–0 away win over Manchester United.

On 13 April 2019, after appearing in a 2–1 away defeat to SPAL, Barzagli announced he would retire at the end of the season. On 19 May, in Juventus's final home game of the 2018–19 Serie A season, a 1–1 draw against Atalanta, Barzagli made his final appearance of his career, and was given a send-off as Juventus celebrated winning the Serie A title. In the 61st minute, he came off for Mario Mandžukić and was given a standing ovation by the crowd.

== International career ==
=== Youth career, senior debut and 2006 World Cup victory ===
Barzagli was a member of the Italian under-21 side that conquered the 2004 UEFA European Under-21 Championship under the guidance of manager Claudio Gentile, and he also appeared at the Summer Olympics in Athens that year, winning a bronze medal. On 17 November 2004, Barzagli debuted for the Italian senior squad in 1–0 friendly home victory against Finland under coach Marcello Lippi.

He was called up for the 2006 FIFA World Cup and, while not expecting to play at all, was deployed as a substitute in a 1–0 victory against Australia in the second round, following Marco Materazzi's sending-off. He subsequently appeared again, starting in his side's 3–0 victory over Ukraine in the quarter-finals following Materazzi's suspension and Alessandro Nesta's injury; he appeared for the full 90 minutes in this fixture, and kept clean sheets in both matches. Italy went on to win the World Cup final that year on penalties over France.

=== Post-World Cup victory and Euro 2008 ===
A key member of Italy's defence under new Italy manager Roberto Donadoni, Barzagli was deployed six times in UEFA Euro 2008 qualifying matches, and appeared in the crucial 2–1 victory over Scotland. He was selected to Italy's UEFA Euro 2008 squad, and partnered alongside Materazzi in the heavy 0–3 defeat against the Netherlands, after Italian skipper Fabio Cannavaro on 2 June suffered an injury in training. Barzagli later suffered an injury in training on 19 June, which kept him out for the rest of the tournament, as Italy were eliminated on penalties in the quarter-finals by the eventual champions Spain.

Because of the fallout from Italy's heavy opening loss of the tournament, Barzagli subsequently appeared for the Azzurri only one time during the following three years, in Italy's 2–1 World Cup qualifier away win against Cyprus after Alessandro Gamberini fell injured after 60 seconds. In spite of winning the Bundesliga with Wolfsburg in 2009, he was not picked by Marcello Lippi for the 2009 FIFA Confederations Cup, or for the 2010 World Cup tournaments, in South Africa.

=== Return to the national team: Euro 2012, 2013 Confederations Cup and 2014 World Cup ===
On 2 October 2011, after three years of absence, he was again called up to the national team by manager Cesare Prandelli, due to his consistent and excellent performances for Juventus; on 11 October, he started in Italy's Euro 2012 qualifier away match against Serbia, and also subsequently started in the European qualifier against Northern Ireland.

On 13 May 2012, Barzagli was selected by Prandelli for the 32-man shortlist for Italy's Euro 2012 squad; he was named as one of the final 23 members of Italy's squad on 29 May. On 1 June 2012, in a preparation match for Euro 2012 against Russia, he captained the team for the first time after Gianluigi Buffon was taken off to be replaced by Morgan De Sanctis. On 4 June, Barzagli suffered an injury during training, which put his place at Euro 2012 in jeopardy; despite initial concerns that he would be unable to participate in the tournament, he was kept in the squad by Prandelli in place of his back-up, Davide Astori, after it was stated that he would only miss Italy's opening group matches against Spain and Croatia.

On 18 June 2012, after recovering from his injury, Barzagli was picked over Leonardo Bonucci to play against Ireland alongside Juventus teammate Chiellini in Italy's last match of the Euro 2012 group stage. In his first match of the tournament, he aided the team to keep a clean sheet in a 2–0 win over Ireland, which allowed Italy to qualify for the knock-out round. On 24 June 2012, Barzagli started in Italy's Euro 2012 quarter-final match against England, which also resulted in an Italian victory on penalties, after the match had finished 0–0 following extra time. On 28 June 2012, Barzagli continued his success in Euro 2012 by aiding Italy in a 2–1 victory against Germany. Italy were eventually defeated by defending European and World Champions Spain in the final of the tournament; although they were defeated 4–0, their place in the final automatically qualified them for the 2013 Confederations Cup.

On 16 May 2013, Barzagli was named to Prandelli's 31-man short-list for Italy's 2013 FIFA Confederations Cup squad; he was eventually called up to the final 23-man Italy squad for the 2013 FIFA Confederations Cup in Brazil on 3 June, and he went on to appear in three of Italy's five matches throughout the tournament. He started in Italy's two opening group wins against Mexico and Japan, whilst he was rested in Italy's 4–2 defeat to hosts and eventual champions Brazil; in the opening 2–1 win over Mexico, he conceded a penalty after fouling Giovani Dos Santos inside the box. After picking up an injury in the semi-final penalty shoot-out defeat against Spain, following a 0–0 draw, he missed Italy's penalty shoot-out victory over Uruguay in the bronze medal match, which allowed them to finish the tournament in third place, their best ever finish in the Confederations Cup.

Barzagli retained his place in the starting lineup throughout the 2014 World Cup Qualifying campaign, as Italy qualified for the tournament undefeated, with two matches to spare. Barzagli was also named to Prandelli's 30-man short-list for the 2014 World Cup on 13 May 2014, and he was also later called up as one of Italy's starting centrebacks for the 2014 FIFA World Cup in Brazil on 1 June. He appeared in all three of Italy's group matches throughout the World Cup, also making his 50th cap in the final group match defeat against Uruguay, as they were knocked out in the first round of the tournament with three points.

=== Euro 2016, 2018 World Cup qualifying campaign and retirement ===
After featuring for Italy in defence during their successful UEFA Euro 2016 qualifying campaign under manager Antonio Conte, Barzagli stated in October 2015 that he would retire from international football after Euro 2016. On 31 May 2016, he was officially named to Conte's 23-man Italy squad for the tournament. Barzagli started in every match of the tournament, helping his nation to keep three clean sheets alongside Bonucci and Chiellini, as Italy reached the quarter-finals, only to be eliminated by Germany 6–5 on penalties on 2 July, despite successfully converting his penalty in the resulting shoot-out against the reigning World Cup champions. Following the defeat in what was initially thought to be the final international match of his career, a visibly emotional Barzagli stated in a press conference with RAI Sport: "We really did give everything. Unfortunately what we're left with is defeat and in my view nothing will remain of all the good things we did. All that remains is disappointment and in a few years nobody will remember anything about this Nazionale that truly gave everything. We really enjoyed our time together and wanted it to continue. We're sad."

Following the tournament, new national team manager Gian Piero Ventura communicated his decision to attempt to convince Barzagli to remain with the national team, even though the defender had previously stated that he would be retiring from international football after the competition. After speaking to Ventura, Barzagli stated in an interview in early August that he would consider continuing to play for the Italy national team if he were to receive a call-up; on 27 August, he was officially called up to the national team once again for a friendly match against France on 1 September, and for Italy's first 2018 World Cup qualification match on 5 September, against Israel. He made his return to international football in Italy's 3–1 friendly home defeat to France.

Italy finished in Group G in second place behind Spain, and advanced to the play-off against Sweden. Italy failed to qualify for the 2018 FIFA World Cup after a 1–0 aggregate loss to Sweden in November 2017. Immediately following the second leg on 13 November, a 0–0 home draw which ultimately proved to be his 73rd and final international appearance, Barzagli announced his retirement from the national team.

== After retirement ==
Following his retirement from professional football, Barzagli was appointed as a member of Juventus's defensive coaching staff under the club's new manager Maurizio Sarri in 2019. He stepped down from his position in May 2020, citing personal reasons as his motivation for leaving the club. On 2 August 2021 it was confirmed, that Barzagli had been hired by the Italian Football Federation where he would have a general role helping the coaches at the various men's national youth teams up to age Under-20.

On 17 July 2025, Barzagli was unveiled as the new assistant coach of Silvio Baldini in charge of the Italy U21 team.

== Style of play ==
Regarded as one of the best defenders of his generation, and as one of Italy's and Juventus's greatest defenders ever, Barzagli was known for his strong, commanding and powerful physical build as a centre-back, and for being "strong in terms of anticipation, concentration and positional sense." Throughout his career with Italy and Juventus, the defensive trio of Barzagli, Bonucci, and Chiellini, which was dubbed the BBC in the media, was considered to be one of the greatest in history, with pundits likening it to Italy's and Juventus's successful defensive trio of the 1930s, made up of full-backs Virginio Rosetta and Umberto Caligaris, as well as centre-half Luis Monti, who also won five consecutive league titles.

Considered a "late-bloomer", he stood out in Italy and in Europe during the 2010s, due to his marking, intelligence, aerial prowess, and precise tackling ability, as well as his correct behaviour, capacity to read the game, and his adeptness in one on one situations; these attributes enabled him to establish himself as one of the best defenders in Italy, and be voted to the Serie A Team of the Year for three consecutive seasons, also making him an important member of both his club and national sides. His calm composure, tactical awareness, consistency, technique, vision, and ball playing ability enabled him to be regarded as one of the best and most complete defenders in the world. Despite not being the quickest defender over short distances, he was also known for his pace, in addition to his anticipation, timing, and ability to read the game, and was a fast sprinter. Although he was usually deployed as a centre-back in a three or four-man defence, he was also capable of playing as a full-back on the right flank. Due to his highly consistent defensive performances at Juventus, he was given the nicknames "The Wall" and "La Roccia" (the rock) by fans. In addition to his ability as a defender, he was highly regarded for his work-rate, discipline, mentality, and dedication in training, as well as his longevity.

== Personal life ==
Barzagli and his wife Maddalena were married in July 2013, and have a son and a daughter.

== Career statistics ==
=== Club ===
As of 19 May 2019

Club	Season	League			Cup		Other		Continental		Total	
Club	Season	Division	Apps	Goals	Apps	Goals	Apps	Goals	Apps	Goals	Apps	Goals
Rondinella	1998–99	Serie D	28	1	–		–		–		28	1
Rondinella	1999–2000	Serie C2	23	2	2	0	2 (Note: Two appearances and one goal in the 1999–2000 Serie C2 Play-out)	1	–		27	3
Rondinella	Total		51	3	2	0	2	1	0	0	57	4
Pistoiese	2000–01	Serie B	5	0	0	0	–		–		5	0
Rondinella	2000–01	Serie C2	13	1	–		–		–		13	1
Ascoli	2001–02	Serie C1	28	1	3	0	0 (Note: All appearances in the 2002 Supercoppa di Serie C)	0	–		31	1
Ascoli	2002–03	Serie B	18	2	1	0	–		–		19	2
Ascoli	Total		46	3	4	0	0	0	0	0	50	3
Chievo	2003–04	Serie A	29	3	1	0	–		–		30	3
Palermo	2004–05	Serie A	37	0	3	0	–		–		40	0
Palermo	2005–06	Serie A	35	2	4	0	–		8 (Note: All appearances in UEFA Cup)	0	47	2
Palermo	2006–07	Serie A	36	1	1	0	–		5	0	42	1
Palermo	2007–08	Serie A	34	0	0	0	–		2	0	36	0
Palermo	Total		142	3	8	0	0	0	15	0	165	3
VfL Wolfsburg	2008–09	Bundesliga	34	0	3	0	–		8	0	45	0
VfL Wolfsburg	2009–10	Bundesliga	24	1	2	0	1	0	5 (Note: Two appearances UEFA Champions League, Three appearances in Europa League)	0	32	1
VfL Wolfsburg	2010–11	Bundesliga	17	0	1	0	–		–		18	0
VfL Wolfsburg	Total		75	1	6	0	1	0	13	0	95	1
Juventus	2010–11	Serie A	15	0	0	0	–		–		15	0
Juventus	2011–12	Serie A	35	1	4	0	–		–		39	1
Juventus	2012–13	Serie A	34	0	4	0	1	0	9 (Note: All appearances in UEFA Champions League)	0	48	0
Juventus	2013–14	Serie A	26	0	1	0	1	0	5 (Note: Four appearances UEFA Champions League, One appearance in Europa League)	0	33	0
Juventus	2014–15	Serie A	10	0	1	0	0	0	6	0	17	0
Juventus	2015–16	Serie A	31	1	2	0	1	0	8	0	42	1
Juventus	2016–17	Serie A	23	0	5	0	0	0	11	0	39	0
Juventus	2017–18	Serie A	25	0	4	0	1	0	8	0	38	0
Juventus	2018–19	Serie A	7	0	0	0	0	0	3	0	10	0
Juventus	Total		206	2	21	0	4	0	50	0	281	2
Career total			567	16	42	0	7	1	78	0	694	17

=== International ===
Appearances and goals by national team and year

National team	Year	Apps	Goals
Italy	2004	1	0
Italy	2005	6	0
Italy	2006	6	0
Italy	2007	6	0
Italy	2008	6	0
Italy	2009	0	0
Italy	2010	0	0
Italy	2011	2	0
Italy	2012	11	0
Italy	2013	8	0
Italy	2014	4	0
Italy	2015	4	0
Italy	2016	11	0
Italy	2017	8	0
Italy	Total	73	0

== Honours ==
Rondinella

- Serie D: 1998–99

Ascoli

- Serie C1: 2001–02
- Supercoppa di Lega di Prima Divisione: 2001–02

Wolfsburg

- Bundesliga: 2008–09

Juventus

- Serie A: 2011–12, 2012–13, 2013–14, 2014–15, 2015–16, 2016–17, 2017–18, 2018–19
- Supercoppa Italiana: 2012, 2013, 2015, 2018
- Coppa Italia: 2014–15, 2015–16, 2016–17, 2017–18
- UEFA Champions League runner-up: 2014–15, 2016–17

Italy U21

- UEFA European Under-21 Championship: 2004

Italy Olympic

- Summer Olympics bronze medal: 2004

Italy

- FIFA World Cup: 2006
- UEFA European Championship runner-up: 2012
- FIFA Confederations Cup third place: 2013

Individual

- Serie A Team of the Year: 2011–12, 2012–13, 2013–14, 2015–16
- UEFA Champions League Team of the Group Stage: 2015
- Premio Nazionale Carriera Esemplare "Gaetano Scirea": 2017
- Juventus FC Hall of Fame: 2025

Orders

- 5th Class / Knight: Cavaliere Ordine al Merito della Repubblica Italiana: 2004
- 4th Class / Officer: Ufficiale Ordine al Merito della Repubblica Italiana: 2006
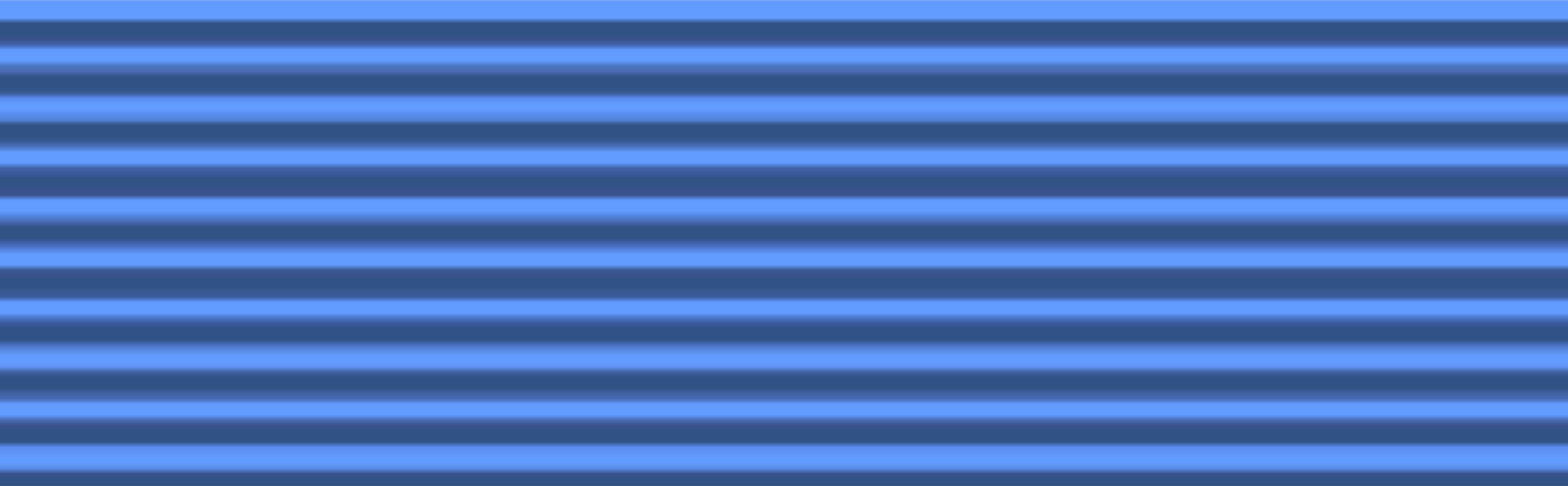
- CONI: Golden Collar of Sports Merit: 2006
