= Serie A Footballer of the Year =

Annual Italian award

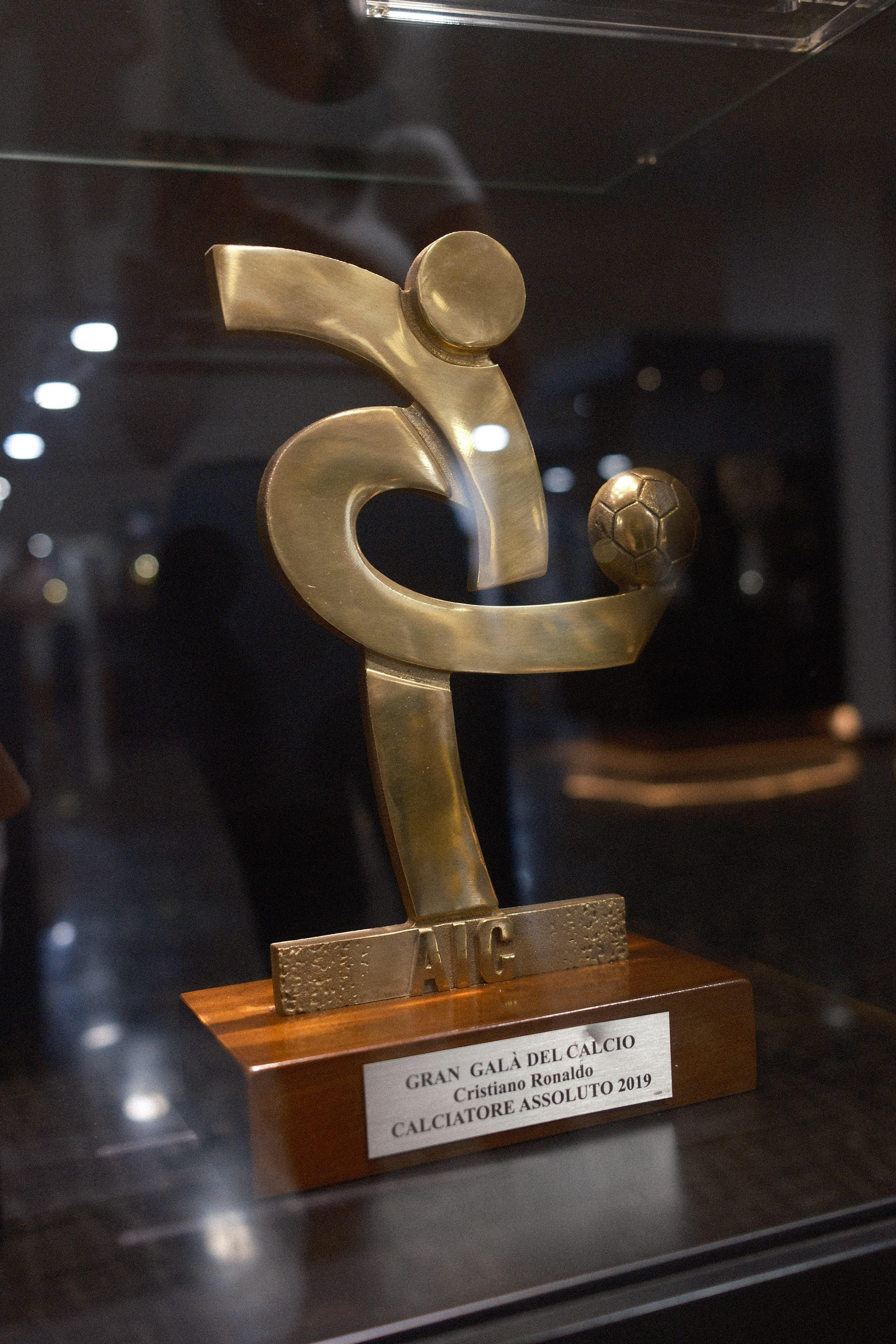
- Sport: Association football
- Competition: Serie A
- Awarded for: Considered to have performed the best in each given Serie A season
- Local name: Migliore calciatore assoluto AIC (Italian)
- Country: Italy
- Presented by: Italian Footballers' Association (AIC)

History
- First award: 1997
- Editions: 29
- First winner: Roberto Mancini (1997)
- Most wins: Zlatan Ibrahimović; Andrea Pirlo (3 times each)
- Most recent: Federico Dimarco (2026)
- Website: Official website

The AIC Serie A Footballer of the Year (Italian: Migliore calciatore assoluto AIC) is a yearly award organized by the Italian Footballers' Association (AIC) given to the footballer who has been considered to have performed the best over the previous Serie A season. The award is part of the Gran Galà del Calcio (formerly known as the "Oscar del Calcio AIC") awards event. Juventus players have won the most awards with twelve. Zlatan Ibrahimović and Andrea Pirlo have won the award the most times (3), with Pirlo's wins coming consecutively.

== History ==
The inaugural award, given at the "Oscar del Calcio AIC" ceremony, was presented after the conclusion of the 1996–97 Serie A season to forward Roberto Mancini of Sampdoria. The following edition was won by Brazilian striker Ronaldo; during his first season with Inter Milan, he scored the second-most goals in Serie A, and the most in the UEFA Cup, which Inter won. The next two recipients of the award were Lazio's Christian Vieri and Roma's Francesco Totti.

Zinedine Zidane won the award with Juventus in the 2000–01 season, becoming the first Frenchman to do so. The following season, compatriot David Trezeguet won the award with the same club, the first time a player won the award while his team won the league in the same season. The seventh edition of the award, in the 2002–03 season, was the first and only time that two players won the award jointly: Czech Republic midfielder Pavel Nedvěd, who won the league with Juventus, and Francesco Totti, who became the first player to win the award for a second time after scoring the most goals for his club that season. Kaká won the award the following season, his debut season for AC Milan. In the 2004–05 season, Alberto Gilardino won the award after scoring 24 goals, including the winning goal in a playoff that kept his club Parma from being relegated to Serie B.

In the 2005–06 season, Fabio Cannavaro became the first defender to win the award. He also won the FIFA World Player of the Year and the Ballon d'Or that season after he was signed by Real Madrid from Juventus midway through 2006 in the wake of the Calciopoli scandal that saw the club stripped of their title and relegated to Serie B. Kaká won the award the following season for the second time in three years after also winning the FIFA World Player of the Year.

Zlatan Ibrahimović won the award for the next two seasons with Inter, as the club also won the league on each occasion. In 2008–09, the second season he won the award, he became the first player to win the award after winning the Capocannoniere award for the league's top scorer. Before the 2009–10 season, Ibrahimović left Inter for Barcelona, replaced by Diego Milito who won the award that season, scoring the second-most goals as Inter won the league again. Ibrahimović was loaned to Milan for the following season, where he won the award for a third time as Milan won the league.

Andrea Pirlo then equalled Ibrahimović's record of wins, winning the award for the next three seasons with Juventus, his first three seasons with the club after signing from Milan in the 2011–12 season, as the club also won the league on each occasion. In his debut season, Pirlo created over 100 chances and completed 2643 passes that season, with an 87 per cent pass completion rate, completing 500 more passes than any other player in Serie A; the only player in the world to have completed more passes than him that season was Xavi. Teammate Carlos Tevez then won the award in the 2014–15 season, his last season with the club, and one where he was the club's top scorer with 20 goals. In the 2015–16 season, another Juventus player won the award, Leonardo Bonucci, becoming only the second defender to do so. The following season, Juventus teammate Gianluigi Buffon became the first goalkeeper to win the award. As Juventus secured their sixth consecutive Serie A title, establishing an all-time record of successive triumphs in the competition, Buffon equalled Virginio Rosetta, Giovanni Ferrari, and Giuseppe Furino as the player with the most Italian league title victories (8).

In the 2017–18 season, Inter player Mauro Icardi won the award, ending the six-year winning streak of Juventus players. He was the joint top scorer in the league alongside Lazio's Ciro Immobile (29), despite Juventus winning the league again. Juventus player Cristiano Ronaldo would then win the award for the next two seasons. In the 2018–19 season, he became the highest ever transfer for an Italian club with his €100 million transfer from Real Madrid to Juventus. In 2019–20, the second season he won the award, he scored the second-most goals in the league, while being the top scorer for his club once again (31). In the 2020–21 season, Romelu Lukaku won the award after winning the Scudetto with Inter, ending a nine-year long streak by Juventus. In the 2021–22 season, Portuguese striker Rafael Leão won the award after contributing to AC Milan's first Italian Serie A title in 11 years. In the subsequent 2022–23 season, Nigerian striker Victor Osimhen claimed the award for his contributions to Napoli's first Italian Serie A title in 33 years, emerging also as the league's top scorer during the season. In the 2023–24 season, Argentine striker Lautaro Martínez won the award after contributing to Inter's twentieth Italian Serie A title, emerging also as the league's top scorer during the season.

In the 2024–25 season, Scottish midfielder Scott McTominay won the award after playing a central role in Napoli's league title, becoming the first Scottish player to receive the honour. In the 2025–26 season, Federico Dimarco won the award after helping Inter win the league title, setting a new Serie A single-season record with 18 assists and scoring a career-best seven goals.

== List of winners ==
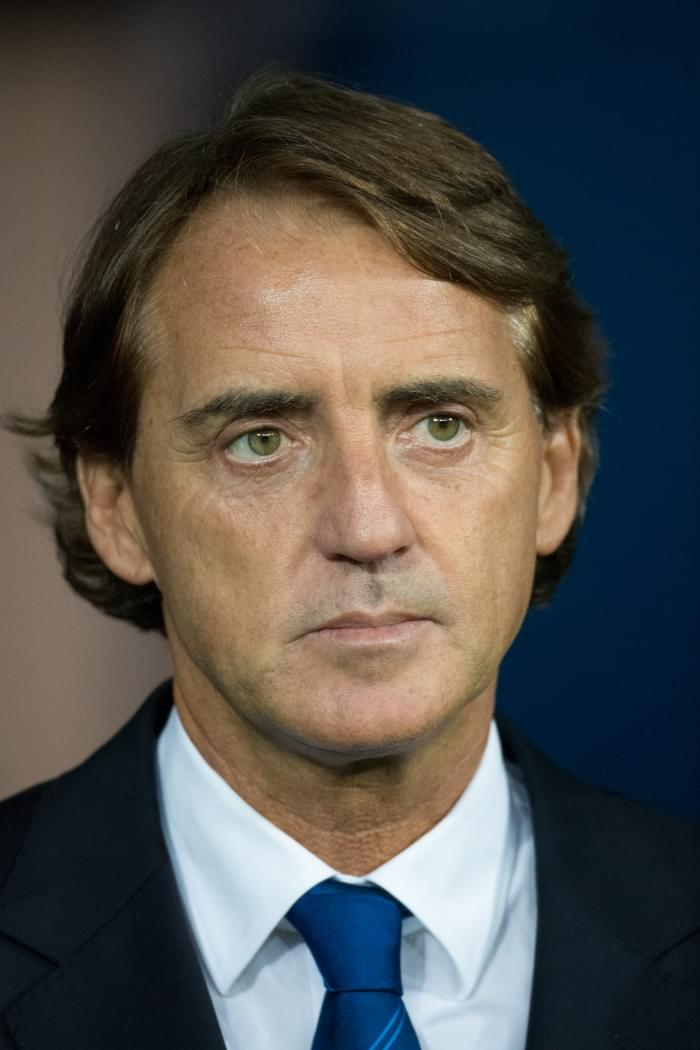
Roberto Mancini won the inaugural award in 1997.

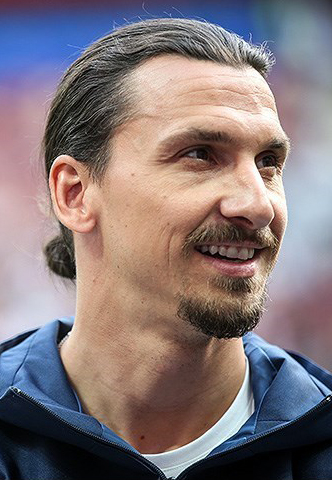
Zlatan Ibrahimović has the most awards won (jointly), with three awards total; he is also the only player to win with two different teams.

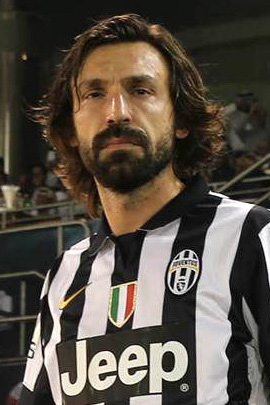
Andrea Pirlo has the most awards won, with three awards total (jointly); he is also the only player to win the award three consecutive times.

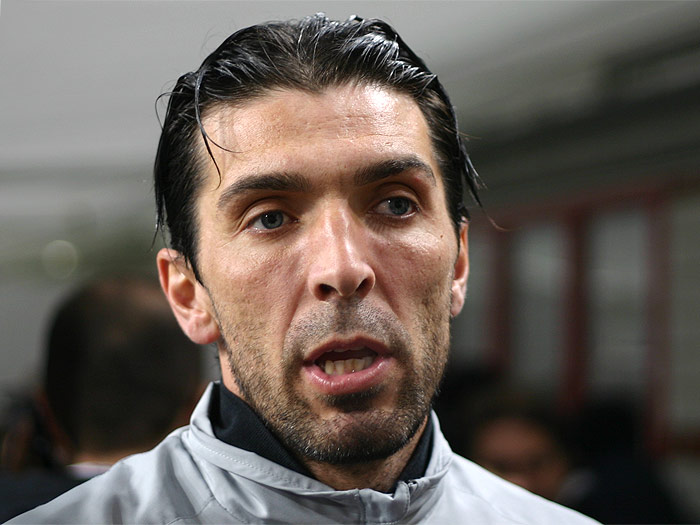
Gianluigi Buffon is the only goalkeeper to have ever won the award (2017).

Key
‡	Indicates player won the FIFA World Player of the Year in the same season
§	Denotes the club were Serie A champions in the same season

List of Serie A Footballer of the Year recipients
Season	Position	Player	Nationality	Club	League appearances	League goals	Ref(s)
1996–97	Forward	Roberto Mancini	Italy	Sampdoria	33	15	
1997–98	Forward	Ronaldo	Brazil	Internazionale	32	25	
1998–99	Forward	Christian Vieri	Italy	Lazio	22	12	
1999–2000	Forward	Francesco Totti	Italy	Roma	27	7	
2000–01	Midfielder	Zinedine Zidane	France	Juventus	33	6	
2001–02	Forward	David Trezeguet	France	Juventus^{§}	34	24	
2002–03	Midfielder	Pavel Nedvěd	Czech Republic	Juventus^{§}	29	9	
2002–03	Forward	Francesco Totti (2)	Italy	Roma	24	14	
2003–04	Midfielder	Kaká	Brazil	Milan^{§}	30	10	
2004–05	Forward	Alberto Gilardino	Italy	Parma	38	23	
2005–06	Defender	Fabio Cannavaro^{‡} (Note: Cannavaro was signed by Real Madrid from Juventus midway through 2006.)	Italy	Juventus	36	4	
2006–07	Midfielder	Kaká^{‡} (2)	Brazil	Milan	31	8	
2007–08	Forward	Zlatan Ibrahimović	Sweden	Internazionale^{§}	26	17	
2008–09	Forward	Zlatan Ibrahimović (2)	Sweden	Internazionale^{§}	35	25	
2009–10	Forward	Diego Milito	Argentina	Internazionale^{§}	35	22	
2010–11	Forward	Zlatan Ibrahimović (3)	Sweden	Milan^{§}	29	14	
2011–12	Midfielder	Andrea Pirlo	Italy	Juventus^{§}	37	3	
2012–13	Midfielder	Andrea Pirlo (2)	Italy	Juventus^{§}	32	5	
2013–14	Midfielder	Andrea Pirlo (3)	Italy	Juventus^{§}	30	4	
2014–15	Forward	Carlos Tevez	Argentina	Juventus^{§}	32	20	
2015–16	Defender	Leonardo Bonucci	Italy	Juventus^{§}	36	3	
2016–17	Goalkeeper	Gianluigi Buffon	Italy	Juventus^{§}	30	0	
2017–18	Forward	Mauro Icardi	Argentina	Internazionale	34	29	
2018–19	Forward	Cristiano Ronaldo	Portugal	Juventus^{§}	31	21	
2019–20	Forward	Cristiano Ronaldo (2)	Portugal	Juventus^{§}	33	31	
2020–21	Forward	Romelu Lukaku	Belgium	Internazionale^{§}	36	24	
2021–22	Forward	Rafael Leão	Portugal	Milan^{§}	34	11	
2022–23	Forward	Victor Osimhen	Nigeria	Napoli^{§}	32	26	
2023–24	Forward	Lautaro Martínez	Argentina	Internazionale^{§}	33	24	
2024–25	Midfielder	Scott McTominay	Scotland	Napoli^{§}	34	12	
2025–26	Defender	Federico Dimarco	Italy	Internazionale^{§}	35	7	

=== By nationality ===
Country	Individuals	Total
Italy	9	12
Argentina	4	4
Brazil	2	3
Portugal	2	3
France	2	2
Sweden	1	3
Czech Republic	1	1
Belgium	1	1
Nigeria	1	1
Scotland	1	1

=== By club ===
Club	Players	Total
Juventus	9	12
Internazionale	7	8
Milan	3	4
Napoli	2	2
Roma	1	2
Lazio	1	1
Parma	1	1
Sampdoria	1	1

=== By position ===
Position	Individuals	Total
Forward	15	19
Midfielder	5	8
Defender	3	3
Goalkeeper	1	1

== See also ==
- Serie A Italian Footballer of the Year
- Guerin d'Oro
