= Leonardo Bonucci =

Italian footballer (born 1987)

Leonardo Bonucci Cavaliere OMRI
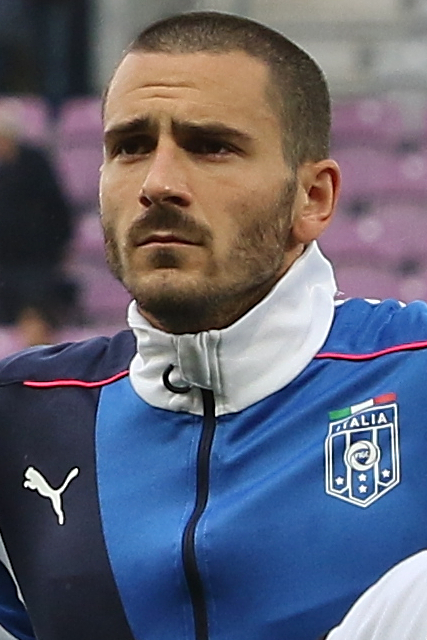
- Bonucci with Italy in 2015

Personal information
- Full name: Leonardo Bonucci
- Date of birth: 1 May 1987 (age 39)
- Place of birth: Viterbo, Italy
- Height: 1.89 m (6 ft 2 in)
- Position: Centre-back

Team information
- Current team: Italy U20 (assistant coach); Italy (technical assistant)

Youth career
- 2004–2005: Viterbese

Senior career*
Years	Team	Apps	(Gls)
2005–2006	Viterbese	0	(0)
2005–2006	→ Inter Milan (loan)	1	(0)
2006–2009	Inter Milan	0	(0)
2007–2009	→ Treviso (loan)	40	(4)
2009	→ Pisa (loan)	18	(1)
2009	Genoa	0	(0)
2009–2010	Bari	38	(1)
2010–2017	Juventus	227	(15)
2017–2018	AC Milan	35	(2)
2018–2023	Juventus	130	(14)
2023–2024	Union Berlin	7	(1)
2024	Fenerbahçe	8	(0)
Total		504	(38)

International career
2010–2023	Italy	121	(8)

Managerial career
- 2024–: Italy U20 (assistant)
- 2025–: Italy (technical assistant)
Medal record
Men's Football
Representing Italy
UEFA European Championship
Winner	2020 Europe
Runner-up	2012 Poland-Ukraine
FIFA Confederations Cup
Third place	2013 Brazil
UEFA Nations League
Third place	2021 Italy
Third place	2023 Netherlands
CONMEBOL–UEFA Cup of Champions
Runner-up	2022 England
- * Club domestic league appearances and goals

Leonardo Bonucci Cavaliere OMRI (Italian pronunciation: [leoˈnardo boˈnuttʃi]; born 1 May 1987) is an Italian professional football coach and former player who played as a centre-back. He is the assistant coach of the Italy national under-20 team and technical assistant of the Italy national team. Considered one of the best defenders of his generation, Bonucci was known for his technique, ball-playing skills, tackling and his ability to play in either a three or four-man defence.

After beginning his career with Inter Milan in 2005, Bonucci spent the next few seasons on loan at Treviso and Pisa, before moving to Bari in 2009. His defensive performances alongside fellow Italian centre-back Andrea Ranocchia earned him a move to Juventus the following season, where he later became a key member of the club's three-man defensive line, alongside Giorgio Chiellini and Andrea Barzagli, establishing himself as one of the best defenders in world football. Among other titles, he went on to win six consecutive Serie A titles with the team between 2012 and 2017, having also played two UEFA Champions League finals in 2015 and 2017. In 2017, he moved to AC Milan, and one season later returned to Juventus, winning two more consecutive league titles.

Internationally, Bonucci earned over 120 caps for Italy between his senior debut in 2010 up until 2023, representing his country at two FIFA World Cups (2010 and 2014), three UEFA European Championships, (2012, 2016, and 2020), and a FIFA Confederations Cup (2013); he won Euro 2020, earned a runners-up medal at Euro 2012, and claimed a third-place medal at the 2013 Confederations Cup.

Bonucci also won several individual honours for his performances: he was named to the UEFA Europa League Squad of the season during the 2013–14 and 2017–18 seasons, and was a four-time member of the Serie A Team of the Year. He was named the Serie A Footballer of the Year in 2016, and was also included in the UEFA Team of the Year in the same season. In 2017 and 2021, Bonucci was included in the FIFA FIFPro World11 and the IFFHS Men's World Team. He was also selected to the 2016–17 UEFA Champions League Team of the Season and the 2016–17 ESM Team of the Year.

== Club career ==
=== Inter Milan ===
Bonucci started his career in the youth ranks of his hometown club Viterbese but was loaned to Inter Milan in the summer of 2005. He played a number of pre-season friendlies for the Inter first team. He then became a member of the Inter U20 team.

On 14 May 2006, Bonucci made his Serie A debut in the last match of the 2005–06 season, in a 2–2 away draw against Cagliari, which was Inter's 3,500th competitive match. On 7 July 2006, Inter bought Bonucci outright.

He played his first Coppa Italia match against Messina on 9 November 2006 when he came off the bench for Fabio Grosso in the 86th minute. Bonucci featured in two more Coppa Italia games for Inter that season when he was brought on for the substituted Walter Samuel at half-time during the quarter-final second leg match against Empoli, and as a starter in the semi-final second leg tie against Sampdoria.

In January 2007, Inter sold 50% of Bonucci's registration rights to Treviso, along with 50% of the registration rights for fellow Primavera team-mate Daniel Maa Boumsong. At that time Bonucci was tagged for a peppercorn fee of €500. Bonucci subsequently remained at Inter until 30 June 2007 while Maa Boumsong returned from Treviso where he spent the first half of the season on loan. During Bonucci's last season with the Inter's youth side, he won the Campionato Nazionale Primavera (the national youth league title).

=== Treviso and Pisa ===
On 1 July 2007, Bonucci and Maa Boumsong formally became players of Treviso after their loan contract back to Inter had expired, as well as the renewal of the co-ownerships in June 2007. At Treviso, Bonucci made 20 starts in 27 Serie B appearances as one of the regular starters.

In June 2008, among the other Inter youth products, Bonucci was the only player that was bought back from Treviso. However, he was loaned back to Treviso for the 2008–09 season. According to a Treviso filing named Tabella N°5 – circolare Co.Vi.So.C. prot. N°4051.4/GC/pc del 11 maggio 2005 in their 2007–08 financial report, Bonucci was sold for a €700,000 fee.

Bonucci played 13 Serie B matches for Treviso before leaving for another fellow Serie B side Pisa on loan.

=== Bari ===
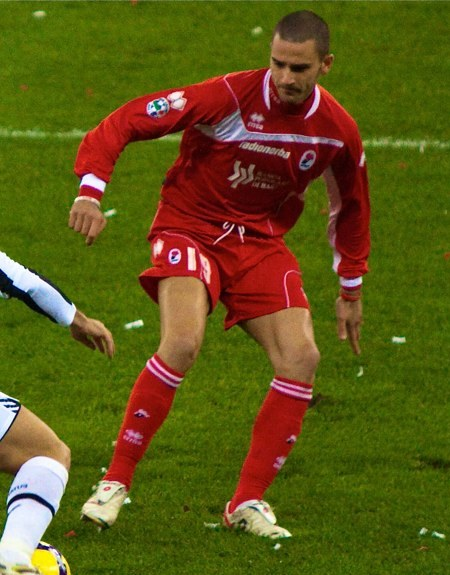
Bonucci playing for Bari in the 2009–10 season

On 8 June 2009, Bonucci underwent a medical examination at Genoa. On 1 July, Inter officially announced that Bonucci, along with Acquafresca, Bolzoni and Meggiorini had been transferred to Genoa, as part of the deal that sent Diego Milito and Thiago Motta to Inter. Moreover, Ivan Fatić who was co-contracted ("co-owned") between Chievo and Inter, became co-contracted between Chievo and Genoa instead, according to a news article by La Gazzetta dello Sport. Bonucci was valued at €3 million at that time.

On 2 July, he was transferred to Bari from Genoa, on a co-ownership deal, for €1.75 million, along with Meggiorini (also on a co-ownership deal), Matteo Paro (on loan), Andrea Ranocchia (on loan) and Giuseppe Greco (on loan).

At Bari he became a first team player in central defence under head coach Gian Piero Ventura, showing a composed yet strong and effective defensive playing style. He formed an extremely strong defensive partnership with Andrea Ranocchia which was so effective that, as of the midway point in the 2009–10 season, Bari had the second best defensive record in Serie A. The strong partnership ended after Ranocchia got injured half-way through the season and was ruled out for the remaining fixtures.

=== Juventus ===
On 1 July 2010, Bonucci was signed by Juventus on a four-year contract for a total of €15.5 million fee from Bari; Bari bought Bonucci from Genoa outright for €8 million. However, Genoa and Bari used part of the transfer receivables to sign the remaining 50% registration rights of Domenico Criscito and 50% of the registration rights of Sergio Bernardo Almirón from Juventus. Bonucci was assigned the shirt number 19.

Partnered with Italy teammate Giorgio Chiellini in defence, Bonucci was immediately drafted into the starting line-up for the first matches of the season making his competitive debut at Shamrock Rovers in the Europa League and scoring his first goal for Juventus in the Europa League play-off match against Sturm Graz.

The following season, due to the presence of veteran of Andrea Barzagli, it was expected that Bonucci would compete with him for a starting place alongside Chiellini in a four-man defence, as the club's new manager Antonio Conte was known for his preference for the 4–2–4 formation, a variant upon the 4–4–2 formation. However, after experimenting with several tactical systems, Conte eventually decided to play all three players in a three-man defence aided by wingbacks in a 3–5–2 formation, and Bonucci established himself once again in the starting eleven alongside Chiellini and Barzagli. Due to their performances together, the three-man defence earned the nickname BBC, a reference to the players' initials. Soon, the trio established themselves as one of the best defences in world football during the following seasons. On 2 April 2012 Juventus announced that he had signed a new 5-year contract effective on 1 July 2012. Bonucci won his first major title, the 2011–12 Scudetto, and contributed two goals as Juventus finished the season undefeated and with one of the best defensive records in the top five European leagues. His good form that season earned him a place in the final UEFA Euro 2012 squad.

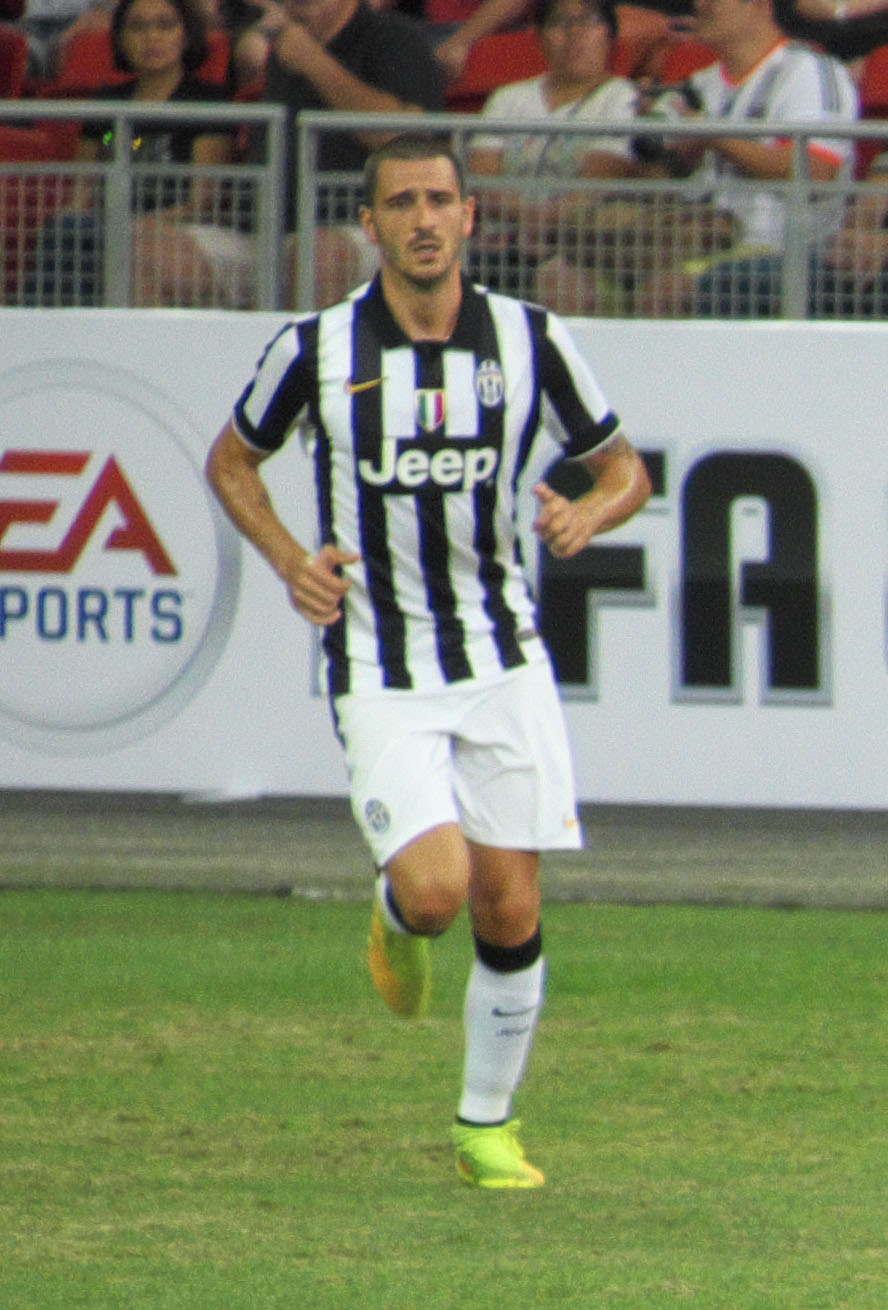
Bonucci playing for Juventus in 2014

Bonucci began the season by winning the 2012 Supercoppa Italiana with Juventus. He made his Champions League debut against Chelsea in the group stage and scored his first goal in the competition against Shaktar Donetsk in October 2012 in a 1–1 draw. In December 2012 Bonucci was criticized for diving in a league game against Palermo on which was described by a number of journalists as "the worst dive ever". He was booked by the referee during the game and subsequently given a one-match ban and a €2000 fine by the authorities. Juventus finished the season by winning the 2012–13 Serie A title.

The following season, Bonucci would help Juventus to defend the Supercoppa Italiana and the Serie A title, although Juventus would suffer a group-stage elimination in the UEFA Champions League. Nevertheless, he helped Juventus to reach the semi-finals of the Europa League, scoring a decisive goal against Lyon in the quarter-finals.

During the 2014–15 season, Bonucci made his 200th appearance with Juventus on 25 January 2015, in a 2–0 win over Chievo. On 6 June 2015, Bonucci started for Juventus in the 2015 UEFA Champions League Final, but were defeated 3–1 by Barcelona at Berlin's Olympiastadion. With 52 appearances, he made the most appearances for Juventus that season across all competitions, along with team-mates Claudio Marchisio and Roberto Pereyra. On 24 November 2015, Bonucci was nominated for the 2015 UEFA Team of the Year. On 2 March 2016, he captained Juventus in the absence of Gianluigi Buffon and Chiellini, scoring the decisive penalty in the resulting shoot-out of the second leg of the Coppa Italia semi-finals against Inter, at the San Siro, following a 3–3 draw on aggregate, which allowed Juventus to progress to the final; however, due to the yellow card he received during the match, and having already been booked prior to the fixture, he missed the victorious final against Milan, which saw Juventus capture a domestic double for the second consecutive season, including a record fifth consecutive league title.

During the beginning of the 2016–17 season, Bonucci dedicated time to his ill son Matteo, missing select matches with Juventus and the national team. On 27 November, Bonucci suffered a severe thigh strain in an eventual 3–1 away loss to Genoa, sidelining him for up to 60 days. On 19 December, Bonucci penned a new deal with Juventus, keeping him at the club until 2021. On 5 January 2017, Bonucci was named to the 2016 UEFA Team of the Year. On 30 January, Bonucci was named to the 2015–16 Serie A Team of the Year, and was also named the 2016 Serie A Footballer of the Year. Bonucci made his 300th Juventus appearance in a 4–1 home win over Palermo on 17 February; however, after Palermo scored a late goal, Bonucci had an argument on the touchline with coach Massimiliano Allegri, causing the club to fine and omit him from the squad for the first Champions League round of 16 leg with Porto on 22 February. On 17 May, Bonucci scored the last goal of a 2–0 win in the final of the 2016–17 Coppa Italia over Lazio. On 3 June, Bonucci started in his second Champions League Final in three years, but Juventus were defeated 4–1 by defending champions Real Madrid. On 5 June, he was subsequently named to the UEFA Champions League squad of the season.

=== AC Milan ===
On 14 July 2017, Bonucci was signed by AC Milan on a five-year contract for a €42 million fee. On 4 August 2017, Bonucci was named one of the three finalists for the Defender of the 2016–17 UEFA Champions League season award. Milan's manager Vincenzo Montella subsequently named Bonucci as the team's new captain later that month. On 23 October, he was named to the 2017 FIFA FIFPro World11. Although much was expected of Bonucci and Milan, the first half of the 2017–18 season was disappointing both for him and the club, and he drew criticism in the media over the quality of his performances. He scored his first goal for Milan on 6 January 2018, in a 1–0 home win over Crotone. On 31 March, Bonucci scored the equalising goal against his former team away to Juventus, breaking goalkeeper Gianluigi Buffon's record of longest consecutive minutes not conceded in an eventual 3–1 defeat.

In 2024, Bonucci claimed it was the newly appointed Elliott club management that decided to part ways with him, allegedly in accordance with their policy of cutting higher costs and focusing on younger players.

=== Return to Juventus ===
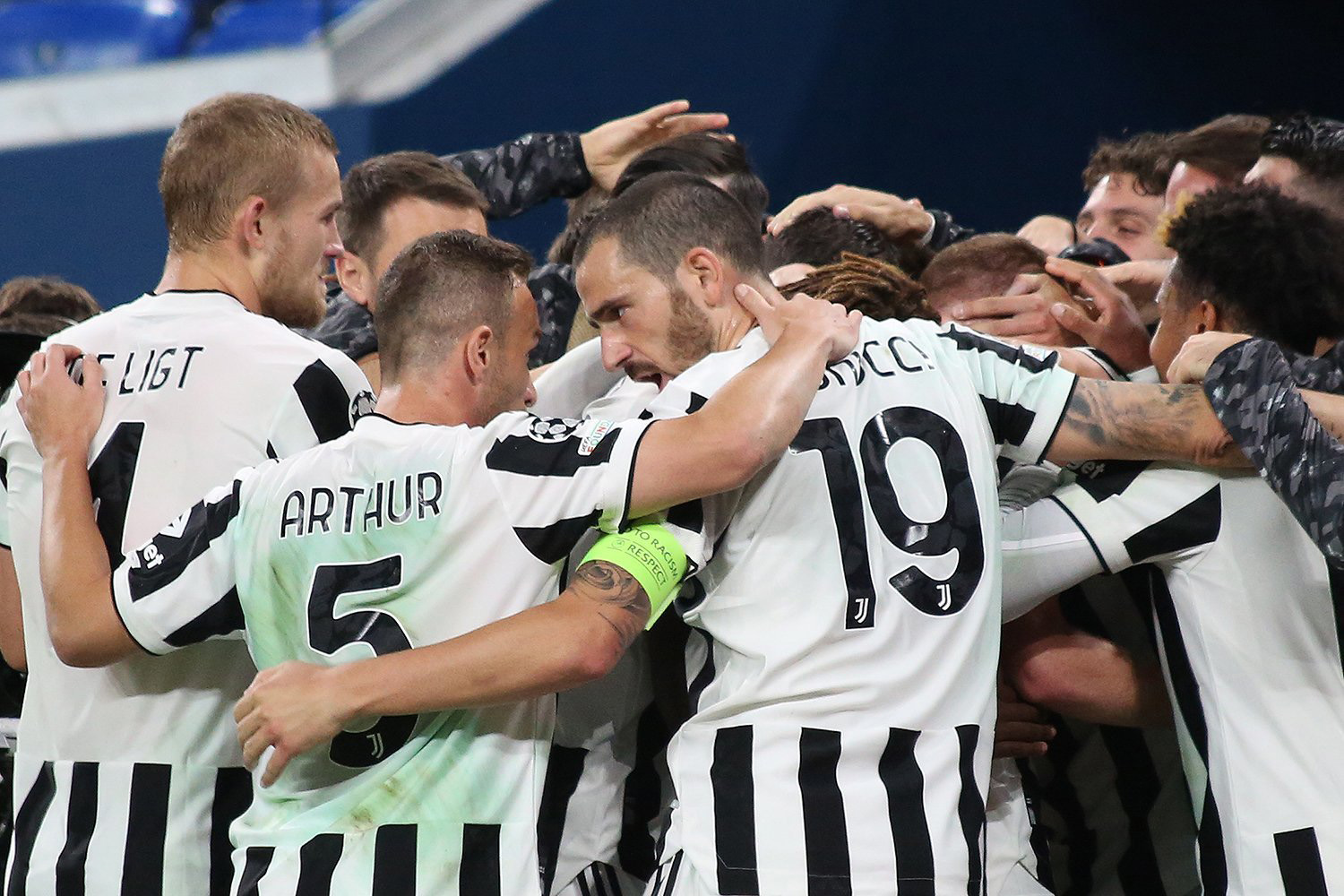
Bonucci, here captaining Juventus, celebrating with his teammates in 2021

On 2 August 2018, Bonucci returned to Juventus as part of a swap deal with Milan involving Mattia Caldara; both Bonucci and Caldara were tagged for €35 million transfer fee. He signed a five-year contract until 30 June 2023.

Bonucci made his return for Juventus as a big body man in their opening Serie A match on 18 August, a 3–2 away win over Chievo, contributing to Juventus's temporary equaliser, an own goal by Mattia Bani. On 29 September 2018, Bonucci scored his first goal for Juventus since his return from Milan, the final goal of a 3–1 home win over Napoli. On 2 October, he made his 50th Champions League appearance in a 3–0 home win over Young Boys.

On 2 April 2019, Bonucci marked his 250th Serie A appearance with Juventus by scoring the opening goal in a 2–0 away win against Cagliari. However, following the match, he was heavily criticised by several prominent figures after stating that teammate Moise Kean was partly to blame for the racial abuse he suffered from the crowd; England international Raheem Sterling deemed the comments 'laughable', while compatriot Mario Balotelli, English singer Stormzy, and former Juventus player Paul Pogba also criticised Bonucci's comments. Bonucci implied that Kean's goal celebration caused further jeers, stating to Sky Sport Italia: "Kean knows that when he scores a goal, he has to focus on celebrating with his teammates. He knows he could've done something differently too. There were racist jeers after the goal, Blaise [Matuidi} heard it and was angered. I think the blame is 50–50, because Moise shouldn't have done that and the Curva should not have reacted that way. We are professionals, we have to set the example and not provoke anyone." Later, he made a post on Instagram which read "Regardless of everything, in any case... no to racism." In response to the criticism, the following day, Bonucci posted on Instagram: "After 24 hours I want to clarify my feelings. Yesterday I was interviewed right at the end of the game, and my words have been clearly misunderstood, probably because I was too hasty in the way I expressed my thoughts. Hours and years wouldn't be enough to talk about this topic. I firmly condemn all forms of racism and discrimination. The abuses are not acceptable at all and this must not be misunderstood."

After Chiellini suffered an anterior cruciate ligament injury at the beginning of the 2019–20 season, Bonucci captained Juventus in his absence. In November 2019, he signed a new contract with the club, running until 2024.

On 20 September 2020, Bonucci scored in Juventus's opening match of the 2020–21 season, a 3–0 home win over Sampdoria in Serie A. On 20 November 2021, Bonucci scored his first brace in his career in a 2–0 win against Lazio through two penalties.

Bonucci was appointed Juventus's new captain for the 2022–23 season. On 11 May 2023, he became the sixth player in the history of the club to reach 500 appearances alongside Juve legends Alessandro Del Piero, Gaetano Scirea, Giorgio Chiellini, Giuseppe Furino, and Gianluigi Buffon. Six days later, he announced he would retire when his contract would expire in 2024. Following the end of the 2022–23 season, it was reported on 13 July that new director Cristiano Giuntoli personally informed Bonucci that he would not be part of the club's plans among other players for the next season.

=== Union Berlin ===
On 1 September 2023, after having been excluded from the first team roster of Juventus, Bonucci signed for German club Union Berlin. On 12 September, it was reported that Bonucci would sue Juventus for damages, related to not providing adequate training conditions in pre-season which affected the player's image. On 20 September, he made his debut at the club by starting in a 1–0 away defeat to Real Madrid in the Champions League, which was also his club's first ever match in the competition. Three days later, he played his first Bundesliga match, in which he conceded a penalty in a match which ended in a 2–0 home defeat against Hoffenheim. On 7 October, he scored his first goal for the club via penalty in a 4–2 loss against Borussia Dortmund. Bonucci announced his departure from the club by mutual consent on 11 January 2024.

=== Fenerbahçe ===
Turkish club Fenerbahçe announced transfer talks with Bonucci on 10 January 2024, a day before he left Union Berlin. That night, Bonucci made an appearance in Şükrü Saracoğlu Stadium, spectating Fenerbahçe's 7–1 win against Konyaspor. The following day, Fenerbahçe officially announced the signing of Bonucci until the end of the 2023–24 season.

Bonucci made his debut for the club on 14 January; against Gaziantep F.K, he replaced the injured Serdar Aziz in the 37th minute. On 18 April, Bonucci as introduced as last-minute substitute for teammate İsmail Yüksek in extra-time in the second leg of the 2023–24 UEFA Europa Conference League quarter-finals against eventual champions Olympiacos; in the ensuing penalty shoot-out, he missed the decisive spot kick.

On 25 May 2024, Fenerbahçe announced that Bonucci would retire from professional football. The next day, Bonucci played his final professional match, appearing as a substitute in a 6–0 home win over İstanbulspor in the league, and said goodbye to fans on the field, officially ending his career as a footballer.

== International career ==
=== Youth career ===
At youth level, Bonucci played for the Italy national under-21 football B team. He was called-up for a friendlies against Renate on 6 November 2007, and against the Under-20 Serie C representative team on 4 December 2007. He was also capped for the team in an internal friendly, which split the Under-21 Serie B team into two on 9 October 2007, on 21 October 2008, on 25 November, and on 24 March 2009, as team captain.

He also received a call-up from the Italy U20 team on 31 May 2007. He was an unused substitute in the 0–1 loss to the Serie D Best XI.

=== 2010–2014: Early senior career ===
Bonucci made his debut with the Italy senior team on 3 March 2010, under manager Marcello Lippi, in a friendly match against Cameroon played in Monaco, which ended in a 0–0 draw, and became one of the few debutants to have never played an official match for the national youth teams. He was included by Lippi in the starting line-up along with national team regulars Fabio Cannavaro and Giorgio Chiellini, forming a three-man defensive line in Lippi's 3–4–3 formation.

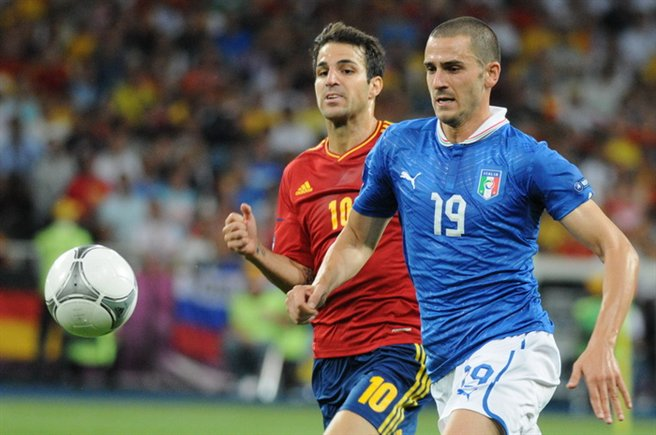
Bonucci (right) playing against Cesc Fàbregas of Spain in the UEFA Euro 2012 Final

Due to his performances during the 2009–10 season, Bonucci was included in the Italy squad for the 2010 FIFA World Cup. He scored his first international goal on 3 June 2010, in a 1–2 friendly loss against Mexico, in a pre-tournament friendly match in Brussels. In the World Cup, he appeared as an unused substitute for all three of Italy's matches, as they suffered a first-round elimination, failing to win a match.

After the World Cup, under new manager Cesare Prandelli, Bonucci took advantage of the international retirement of Cannavaro and broke into the starting line-up beside Juventus teammate Chiellini. He ended a fine 2011–12 season by earning a place in the final 23-man Italy squad for UEFA Euro 2012, helping Italy to reach the final of the tournament, where they were defeated 4–0 by defending champions Spain. He started in all but one match as Italy reached the finals.

In the 2013 FIFA Confederations Cup, he missed his spot-kick in the penalty shoot-out against Spain in the semi-finals, shooting high over the bar as Italy went out of the competition losing 7–6 on penalties; Italy would win the bronze medal match over Uruguay 4–3 on penalties, after a 2–2 draw following extra-time, allowing them to capture third place.

Bonucci was selected by Cesare Prandelli to be part of the Italy squad that would take part at the 2014 FIFA World Cup in Brazil. Although he once again remained an unused substitute for the first two games, he made his World Cup debut on 24 June 2014, in a 0–1 loss to Uruguay; as a result, Italy was eliminated in the first round of the competition for a second consecutive time.

=== 2014–2018: Euro 2016 and failed 2018 World Cup qualification ===
On 4 September 2014, under new Italy manager Antonio Conte, Bonucci wore the captain's armband for Italy for the first time, following Daniele De Rossi's substitution in a 2–0 friendly win over the Netherlands.

On 31 May 2016, Bonucci was named to Conte's 23-man Italy squad for UEFA Euro 2016. On 13 June he set up Emanuele Giaccherini's goal, Italy's first of the match, with a long ball in a 2–0 win over Belgium in the opening group match of Euro 2016; he was later booked for a tactical foul. After helping Italy to another clean-sheet in a 1–0 victory in the second group match against Sweden on 17 June, Bonucci was once again praised for his defensive performances alongside Chiellini and Barzagli. On 22 June, he captained Italy in Buffon's absence in his nation's final group match, a 1–0 defeat to Ireland. On 27 June he produced a Man of the Match performance in the round of 16 of the tournament as he helped Italy to keep a third clean sheet and defeat defending champions Spain 2–0. In the quarter-final fixture against Germany on 2 July, he scored Italy's equalising goal from a penalty, although his spot-kick was saved by Manuel Neuer in the resulting shoot-out, as the reigning World Cup champions advanced to the semi-finals following a 6–5 shoot-out victory.

In the 2018 FIFA World Cup qualifying campaign, Italy finished in second place in Group G behind Spain and advanced to the play-off against Sweden. Italy failed to qualify for the 2018 FIFA World Cup after a 1–0 aggregate loss to the Scandinavians.

=== 2019–2021: Euro 2020 victory ===
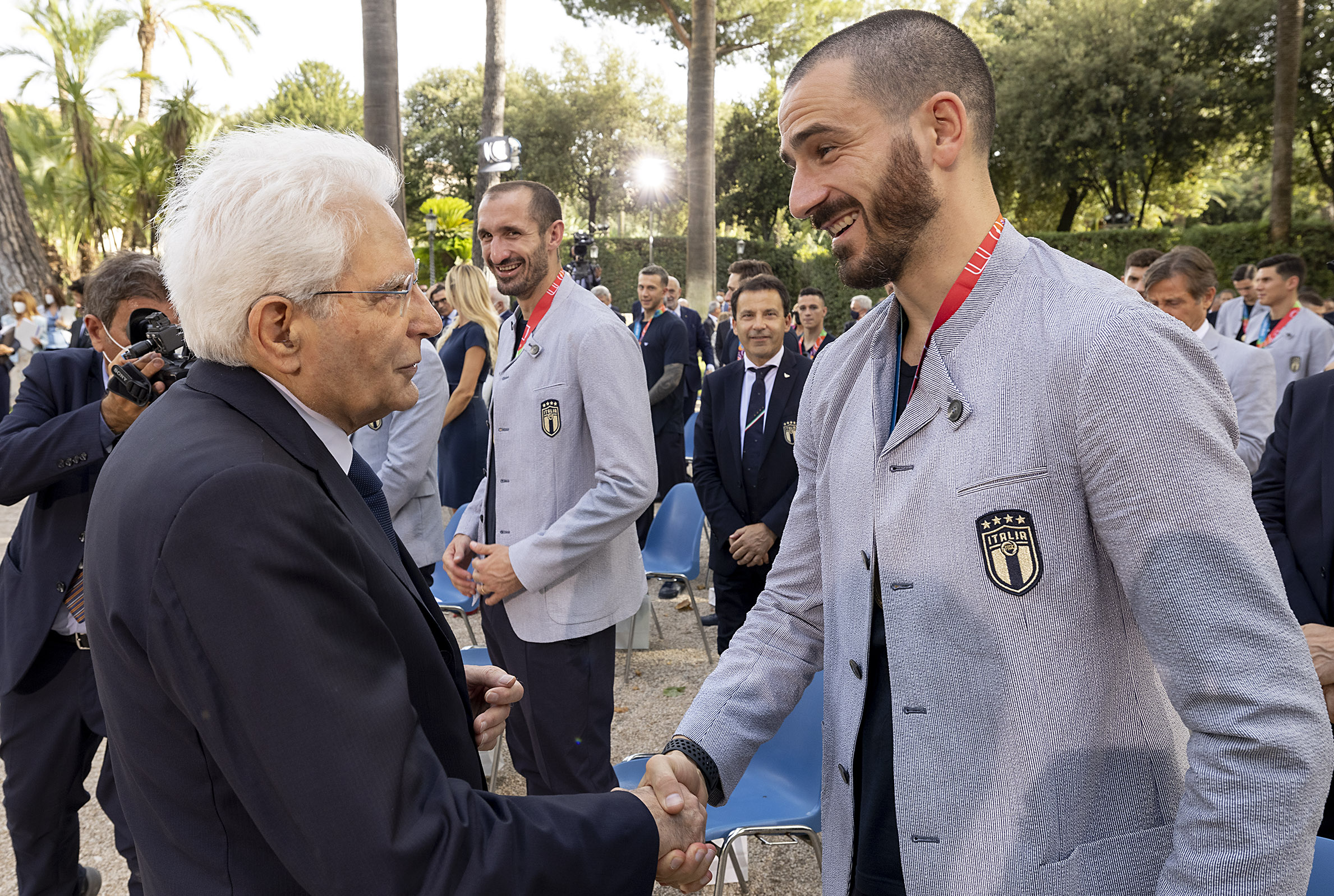
Bonucci (right) and President of Italy Sergio Mattarella (left) shaking hands following Italy's UEFA Euro 2020 win

On 12 October 2019, Bonucci made his 92nd international appearance, under manager Roberto Mancini, in a 2–0 home win over Greece, and overtook Alessandro Del Piero as the tenth-most capped player in the history of the Italy national team; the victory sealed Italy's qualification for Euro 2020. He made his 94th appearance for Italy on 15 November, in a 3–0 away win over Bosnia and Herzegovina, in a Euro 2020 qualifier, equalling Giacinto Facchetti as the ninth most-capped Italian player of all time.

On 11 October 2020, Bonucci made his 98th international appearance in a 0–0 away draw against Poland in the UEFA Nations League, equalling Gianluca Zambrotta as the eight–most capped player of all–time for the Italy national team. On 25 March 2021, Bonucci made his 100th appearance for Italy in a 2–0 home win over Northern Ireland, in the team's first 2022 World Cup qualifying match.

In June 2021, Bonucci was included in Italy's squad for UEFA Euro 2020. During the tournament, he served as a temporary captain for Italy following an injury to Giorgio Chiellini in the first round. On 6 July, following a 1–1 draw after extra-time against Spain in the semi-final of the competition, he scored Italy's third spot-kick in an eventual 4–2 penalty shoot-out victory, to send Italy to the final. On 11 July, Bonucci won the European Championship with Italy following a 3–2 victory over England at Wembley Stadium in a penalty shoot-out after a 1–1 draw in extra-time. Bonucci scored Italy's only goal of the game in the 67th minute to tie the match, and later converted Italy's third penalty in the shoot-out; his goal during regulation time made him the oldest player ever to score in a European Championship final, at the age of 34 years and 71 days. For his performance during the final, he was named Star of the Match by UEFA. For his performances throughout the competition, he was later also named to the team of the tournament.

=== 2022–2023: Captaincy ===
On 23 September 2022, Bonucci took over as captain after Chiellini's international retirement, in which Italy defeated England 1–0 during the Nations League A; during the match, he became Italy's joint fourth-highest capped player of all time, alongside De Rossi and Chiellini, with 117 appearances, behind only Paolo Maldini (126), Fabio Cannavaro (136), and Gianluigi Buffon (176). In June 2023, he was included in the final squad for the Nations League Finals, where he played in the 2–1 defeat against Spain in the semi-finals on 15 June, which was ultimately his final international appearance.

Despite joining Turkish side Fenerbahçe in January 2024, in an attempt to receive a call-up from Italy's new manager Luciano Spalletti, Bonucci was no longer called up to the national team, and was ultimately left out of Italy's squad for Euro 2024 in May, with Bonucci subsequently announcing his retirement from professional football later that same month. In total, he made 121 appearances for Italy, scoring eight goals.

== Style of play ==
A former midfielder who was usually deployed as ball-playing centre-back in a three-man defence (although he was also capable of playing in a four-man defence, both in the centre or out wide), Bonucci was primarily known for his technique, passing range, and his ability to launch an attack from the back with long passes. Although he was not the quickest player over short distances, he was a tall, mobile, and strong defender, with a good positional sense, as well as good anticipation, solid tackling, and an ability to read the game and mark opponents, on top of his ball skills; he also excelled in the air, and frequently posed a goal threat from set pieces.

Despite having been considered to be a talented and promising young defender, he was also criticised by certain pundits for being inconsistent and prone to errors or lapses in concentration in his youth, which were dubbed "Bonucciate" in the Italian media, a reference to their similarity to Cesare Maldini's Maldinate; in 2021, the neologism bonucciata was even included in the Italian encyclopedia Treccani. However, he showed notable improvements during the 2014–15 season, and established himself as one of the best defenders in world football, also drawing praise from manager Pep Guardiola, who described Bonucci as one of his "favourite ever players".

In 2016, Mario Sconcerti of Il Corriere della Sera ranked Bonucci among the greatest Italian defenders of all time. His unique playing style led Giovanni Galli to compare him to former sweeper Gaetano Scirea. In 2012, The Guardian named him the 88th Best Player in the World and in 2016, he was named the 26th Best Player in the World. In 2016, his defensive attributes, as well as his skill on the ball, vision, and accurate passing, moved La Repubblica to dub him as “Beckenbonucci”, a reference to former German sweeper Franz Beckenbauer.

In addition to his defensive, playmaking and technical skills, Bonucci was also praised for his leadership and ability to organise his back-line. In 2017, he was ranked by some as the best defender in the world. Throughout his career with Italy and Juventus, the defensive trio of Barzagli, Bonucci, and Chiellini, which was dubbed the BBC in the media, was considered to be one of the greatest in history, with pundits likening it to Italy's and Juventus's successful defensive trio of the 1930s, made up of full-backs Virginio Rosetta and Umberto Caligaris, as well as centre-half Luis Monti, who also won five consecutive league titles. With Andrea Barzagli's retirement, the subsequent Bonucci–Chiellini axis was considered, in terms of longevity and performance at high levels, one of the most solid and complementary in international football, as well as being compared to duets from the past such as Beckenbauer–Schwarzenbeck, Scirea–Gentile or Baresi–Costacurta.

== After retirement ==
In July 2024, Bonucci obtained his UEFA B License, which made him eligible to assist coaches of Serie C teams.

In October 2024, Bonucci began his coaching career as the assistant coach of the Italy U-20 national team managed by Bernardo Corradi. In June 2025, he was given the role of technical assistant of the senior team managed by Gennaro Gattuso.

He captained the Italy team at the 2025 Kings World Cup Nations. He played as part of the Soccer Aid 2025 charity match for the “Soccer Aid World XI”.

== Personal life ==
On 18 June 2011, Bonucci married Martina Maccari (born 19 November 1985), a former model and blogger, whom he first met in 2008 through a mutual friend. They have two sons, Lorenzo (b. July 2012) and Matteo (b. May 2014), and one daughter, Matilda (b. February 2019). Although Bonucci played for Juventus for several seasons, his eldest son, Lorenzo, supports Juventus's cross-city rivals, Torino. In July 2016, Bonucci's youngest son, Matteo underwent emergency surgery following the onset of an acute illness. In a 2017 interview with El País, Bonucci revealed that his son's illness had even led him to think about quitting football, commenting:

"For three or four months, my head was just not in the right place, it's the head that gets the legs moving. For around 15 days after the surgery, until I started to see him improving, I was just not interested in training or anything to do with football. I've always hated hospitals and tried to avoid them, but at that time I had to be there and I was really struggling to be calm. Matteo is much better now and our family feels more united than ever. Yes, I thought about quitting. Football was just not my priority at that moment. You see your son with so much to live for, he's asking you so many questions and why this is happening to him... and I had no answers. Priorities change at those times. Now I tell myself that I am lucky. Everything I have done has been from the heart."

Bonucci's older brother, Riccardo (b. November 1982), was also a footballer who once played as a central defender in Serie C1 with Viterbese. Their father owns a paint shop in Viterbo.

In May 2012, during the 2011–12 Italian football scandal investigations, Bonucci, along with Juventus teammate Simone Pepe and manager Antonio Conte, as well as many other players, were accused of match-fixing; Bonucci was accused of helping to fix the result of a 3–3 draw against Udinese in May 2010, during his time with Bari, and faced a potential three-and-a-half-year ban if found guilty. Bonucci denied any wrongdoing, however, and both he and Pepe were later acquitted in August later that year.

In October 2012, Bonucci and his wife and then five-month-old son were confronted by an armed robber who demanded the defender hand over his watch. As the robber reached out to take the watch, Bonucci reportedly punched him and chased him down the street. The robber escaped with his accomplice on a motorbike.

Bonucci is an anti-bullying activist. In December 2017, he made a cameo appearance in the music video for "Buona fortuna" by Benji & Fede, whose storyline deals with bullying. In October 2019, together with the journalist and editor Francesco Ceniti, he co-wrote and released a book "Il mio amico Leo" (My friend Leo), partially inspired by his own experiences and designed to provide support to bullying victims.

== Career statistics ==
=== Club ===
Appearances and goals by club, season and competition
Club	Season	League			National cup (Note: Includes Coppa Italia and Turkish Cup)		Europe		Other		Total	
Club	Season	Division	Apps	Goals	Apps	Goals	Apps	Goals	Apps	Goals	Apps	Goals
Inter Milan (loan)	2005–06	Serie A	1	0	0	0	0	0	0	0	1	0
Inter Milan	2006–07	Serie A	0	0	3	0	0	0	0	0	3	0
Inter Milan	Total		1	0	3	0	0	0	0	0	4	0
Treviso (loan)	2007–08	Serie B	27	2	0	0	—		—		27	2
Treviso (loan)	2008–09	Serie B	13	2	1	0	—		—		14	2
Treviso (loan)	Total		40	4	1	0	0	0	0	0	41	4
Pisa (loan)	2008–09	Serie B	18	1	0	0	—		—		18	1
Bari	2009–10	Serie A	38	1	1	0	—		—		39	1
Juventus	2010–11	Serie A	34	2	2	0	8 (Note: Appearances in UEFA Europa League)	1	—		44	3
Juventus	2011–12	Serie A	32	2	5	0	—		—		37	2
Juventus	2012–13	Serie A	33	0	4	0	10 (Note: Appearances in UEFA Champions League)	1	1 (Note: Appearance in Supercoppa Italiana)	0	48	1
Juventus	2013–14	Serie A	29	2	1	0	13 (Note: Six appearances in UEFA Champions League, seven appearances and one goal in UEFA Europa League)	1	1	0	44	3
Juventus	2014–15	Serie A	34	3	4	1	13	0	1	0	52	4
Juventus	2015–16	Serie A	36	3	4	0	8	0	1	0	49	3
Juventus	2016–17	Serie A	29	3	5	1	11	1	0	0	45	5
Juventus	Total		227	15	25	2	63	4	4	0	319	21
AC Milan	2017–18	Serie A	35	2	5	0	11	0	—		51	2
Juventus	2018–19	Serie A	29	3	1	0	10	0	1	0	41	3
Juventus	2019–20	Serie A	35	3	4	1	7	0	1	0	47	4
Juventus	2020–21	Serie A	26	2	2	0	6	0	1	0	35	2
Juventus	2021–22	Serie A	24	5	3	0	7	0	0	0	34	5
Juventus	2022–23	Serie A	16	1	1	0	9 (Note: Six appearances and one goal in UEFA Champions League, three appearances in UEFA Europa League)	1	—		26	2
Juventus	Total		130	14	11	1	39	1	3	0	183	16
Union Berlin	2023–24	Bundesliga	7	1	0	0	3	0	—		10	1
Fenerbahçe	2023–24	Süper Lig	8	0	3	0	2 (Note: Appearances in UEFA Europa Conference League)	0	0	0	13	0
Career total			504	38	49	3	118	5	7	0	678	46

=== International ===
Appearances and goals by national team and year
National team	Year	Apps	Goals
Italy	2010	8	2
Italy	2011	5	0
Italy	2012	11	0
Italy	2013	11	0
Italy	2014	8	1
Italy	2015	10	0
Italy	2016	14	1
Italy	2017	8	1
Italy	2018	10	1
Italy	2019	10	1
Italy	2020	4	0
Italy	2021	15	1
Italy	2022	6	0
Italy	2023	1	0
Total		121	8

Scores and results list Italy's goal tally first, score column indicates score after each Bonucci goal.

List of international goals scored by Leonardo Bonucci
No.	Date	Venue	Opponent	Score	Result	Competition
1	3 June 2010	King Baudouin Stadium, Brussels, Belgium	Mexico	1–2	1–2	Friendly
2	3 September 2010	A. Le Coq Arena, Tallinn, Estonia	Estonia	2–1	2–1	UEFA Euro 2012 qualifying
3	9 September 2014	Ullevaal Stadion, Oslo, Norway	Norway	2–0	2–0	UEFA Euro 2016 qualifying
4	2 July 2016	Nouveau Stade de Bordeaux, Bordeaux, France	Germany	1–1	1–1 (a.e.t.) (5–6 p)	UEFA Euro 2016
5	28 March 2017	Amsterdam Arena, Amsterdam, Netherlands	Netherlands	2–1	2–1	Friendly
6	1 June 2018	Allianz Riviera, Nice, France	France	1–2	1–3	Friendly
7	8 June 2019	Olympic Stadium, Athens, Greece	Greece	3–0	3–0	UEFA Euro 2020 qualifying
8	11 July 2021	Wembley Stadium, London, England	England	1–1	1–1 (a.e.t.) (3–2 p)	UEFA Euro 2020 final

== Honours ==
Inter Milan

- Serie A: 2005–06
- Coppa Italia Primavera: 2006

Juventus

- Serie A: 2011–12, 2012–13, 2013–14, 2014–15, 2015–16, 2016–17, 2018–19, 2019–20
- Coppa Italia: 2014–15, 2015–16, 2016–17, 2020–21
- Supercoppa Italiana: 2012, 2013, 2015, 2018, 2020
- UEFA Champions League: Runners-up: 2014–15, 2016–17

Italy

- UEFA European Championship: 2020; runner-up: 2012

Individual

- FIFA FIFPro World11: 2017, 2021
- Serie A Team of the Year: 2014–15, 2015–16, 2016–17, 2019–20
- Serie A Footballer of the Year: 2015–16
- UEFA Team of the Year: 2016
- UEFA Europa League Squad of the Season: 2013–14, 2017–18
- UEFA Champions League Team of the Season: 2016–17
- ESM Team of the Year: 2016–17
- L'Équipe Team of the Year: 2016
- IFFHS Men's World Team: 2017, 2021
- IFFHS UEFA Team of the Decade: 2011–2020
- IFFHS Men's UEFA Team of the Year: 2021
- UEFA Euro 2020 Final: Man of the Match
- UEFA European Championship Team of the Tournament: 2020
- Globe Soccer Awards Best Defender of the Year: 2021
- Juventus FC Hall of Fame: 2025

Orders

- 5th Class / Knight: Cavaliere Ordine al Merito della Repubblica Italiana: 2021

== See also ==
- List of men's footballers with 100 or more international caps
