= 2015–16 Juventus FC season =

Italian football club season

Juventus
2015–16 season
- Chairman: Andrea Agnelli
- Head coach: Massimiliano Allegri
- Stadium: Juventus Stadium
- Serie A: 1st
- Coppa Italia: Winners
- Supercoppa Italiana: Winners
- UEFA Champions League: Round of 16
- Top goalscorer: League: Paulo Dybala (19); All: Paulo Dybala (23)
- Highest home attendance: 41,332 vs Bayern Munich (23 February 2016, Champions League)
- Lowest home attendance: 29,205 vs Chievo (12 September 2015, Serie A)
- Average home league attendance: 38,755
Home colours	Away colours	Third colours

The 2015–16 season was Juventus Football Club's 118th in existence and ninth consecutive season in the top flight of Italian football in Serie A was their from promotion to Serie B in 2007 . Juventus added a third star to their jersey with new kit manufacturers Adidas in addition to the Coppa Italia badge for winning their tenth Coppa Italia the previous season. On 8 August 2015, Juventus defeated Coppa Italia runners-up Lazio to win the Supercoppa Italiana for a record 7th time. On 25 April 2016, the club won their fifth straight title (and 32nd overall) since last winning five straight between 1930–31 and 1934–35, after second place Napoli lost to Roma to give Juventus the title with three games to spare. After winning only three of their first ten league matches and losing to Sassuolo on 28 October 2015, which left them in 12th place, the team went on a run of 25 matches in which they took 73 points of a possible 75, and secured the title. On 21 May, the club then won the Coppa Italia for the 11th time, and their second straight title, becoming the first team in Italy's history to complete Serie A and Coppa Italia doubles in back-to-back seasons. They also became the first Italian team to complete the domestic treble (Serie A, Coppa Italia, Supercoppa Italiana).

== Season review ==
In the summer of 2015, several departures and arrivals occurred: Pirlo, Vidal, Tevez, Coman and Llorente leave the club, all towards foreign leagues. In order to counterbalance sales, the club proceeds to buy Alex Sandro, Khedira, Dybala, Zaza and Mandžukić. Juventus won the Supercoppa Italiana but the line-up revolution looks deleterious, as the Bianconeri start the domestic league with two losses to Udinese and Roma. In the following weeks, the club suffers draws to Chievo and Frosinone at Juventus Stadium, while Napoli and Sassuolo also defeat Allegri's team. In Europe, however, the second place of previous season is confirmed: Juventus suffers only one loss during the group stage, in the last match by Sevilla. Then the club went on a run in the league that resulted in a series of 15 wins in row, starting with Derby della Mole which ended 2–1 (with the final goal scored in injury time). In the first leg of the Coppa Italia semi-finals, Internazionale lost 3–0 in Turin.

The winning league streak is stopped on 19 February 2016, due to a goalless draw with Bologna. Four days later, Juventus face Bayern Munich (for the Champions League round of 16), the German side goes up 2–0, before Juventus manage to fill the gap for a final 2–2 draw. The Nerazzurri were able to recover from a 3–goal handicap: they lose only on penalties, due to Palacio's miss. In the second round of 16 leg in the Champions League, Pogba and Cuadrado bring Juventus up 2–0, but Lewandowski and Thomas Müller (who scores during injury time) equalize the score: in extra time, Thiago and ex-Juventus player Coman mark the goals to knock-out Juventus out 4–2. Four days after, Buffon celebrates a record for goalkeepers in Serie A, having a clean sheet of 974 minutes. On 25 April, Juventus, nine points ahead of Napoli, were assured of the Scudetto, after Napoli were defeated by Roma. Juventus ended the league with 91 points, also winning, a week later, the domestic cup (for the second time in row) with a 1–0 in extra time win against Milan.

== Players ==
=== Squad information ===
Players and squad numbers last updated on 18 September 2015.
Note: Flags indicate national team as has been defined under FIFA eligibility rules. Players may hold more than one non-FIFA nationality.

No.	Name	Nat	Position(s)	Date of birth (Age at end of season)	Signed in	Contract ends	Signed from	Transfer Fee	Notes
Goalkeepers
1	Gianluigi Buffon	(Italy)	GK	28 January 1978 (aged 38)	2001	2017	(Italy) Parma	€45M	Captain
25	Neto	(Brazil)	GK	19 July 1989 (aged 26)	2015	2019	(Italy) Fiorentina	Free	
34	Rubinho	(Brazil)	GK	4 August 1982 (aged 33)	2012	2016	Unattached	Free	
38	Emil Audero	(Italy)	GK	18 January 1997 (aged 19)	2015		(Italy) Youth Sector	N/A	
Defenders
3	Giorgio Chiellini	(Italy)	CB / LB	14 August 1984 (aged 31)	2005	2018	(Italy) Fiorentina	€7.4M	Vice-captain
4	Martín Cáceres	(Uruguay)	CB / RB	7 April 1987 (aged 29)	2012	2016	(Spain) Sevilla	€8M	
12	Alex Sandro	(Brazil)	LB	26 January 1991 (aged 25)	2015	2020	(Portugal) Porto	€26M	
15	Andrea Barzagli	(Italy)	CB	8 May 1981 (aged 35)	2011	2016	(Germany) Wolfsburg	€0.3M	
19	Leonardo Bonucci	(Italy)	CB	1 May 1987 (aged 29)	2010	2020	(Italy) Bari	€15.5M	
24	Daniele Rugani	(Italy)	CB	29 July 1994 (aged 21)	2015	2020	(Italy) Empoli	€3.5M	
26	Stephan Lichtsteiner	(Switzerland)	RB / RWB	16 January 1984 (aged 32)	2011	2017	(Italy) Lazio	€10M	
33	Patrice Evra	(France)	LB	15 May 1981 (aged 35)	2014	2016	(England) Manchester United	€1.6M	
Midfielders
6	Sami Khedira	(Germany)	DM / CM	4 April 1987 (aged 29)	2015	2019	(Spain) Real Madrid	Free	
8	Claudio Marchisio	(Italy)	CM / AM	19 January 1986 (aged 30)	2006	2020	(Italy) Youth Sector	N/A	Second vice-captain
10	Paul Pogba	(France)	DM / CM	15 March 1993 (aged 23)	2012	2019	(England) Manchester United	Free	
11	Hernanes	(Brazil)	CM	29 May 1985 (aged 31)	2015	2018	(Italy) Internazionale	€11M	
18	Mario Lemina	(Gabon)	DM / CM	1 September 1993 (aged 22)	2015	2016	(France) Marseille	€0.5M	On loan
20	Simone Padoin	(Italy)	RM / CM / RB	18 March 1984 (aged 32)	2012	2017	(Italy) Atalanta	€5M	
22	Kwadwo Asamoah	(Ghana)	CM / LM / LWB	9 December 1988 (aged 27)	2012	2018	(Italy) Udinese	€18M	
27	Stefano Sturaro	(Italy)	DM / CM	9 March 1993 (aged 23)	2014	2019	(Italy) Genoa	€5.5M	
37	Roberto Pereyra	(Argentina)	AM / LW	7 January 1991 (aged 25)	2014	2020	(Italy) Udinese	€14M	
Forwards
7	Simone Zaza	(Italy)	ST / CF	25 June 1991 (aged 25)	2015	2020	(Italy) Sassuolo	€18M	
9	Álvaro Morata	(Spain)	ST / CF / SS	23 October 1992 (aged 23)	2014	2020	(Spain) Real Madrid	€20M	
16	Juan Cuadrado	(Colombia)	RW / RWB	26 May 1988 (aged 28)	2015	2016	(England) Chelsea	€1.5M	On loan
17	Mario Mandžukić	(Croatia)	ST / CF	21 May 1986 (aged 30)	2015	2019	(Spain) Atlético Madrid	€19M	
21	Paulo Dybala	(Argentina)	ST / CF / SS	15 November 1993 (aged 22)	2015	2020	(Italy) Palermo	€32M	
39	Andrea Favilli	(Italy)	ST / CF	17 May 1997 (aged 19)	2015	2016	(Italy) Livorno	€0.15M	On loan

== Transfers ==
=== Summer 2015 ===
==== In ====
Date	Pos.	Player	Age	Moving from	Fee	Notes	Source
4 June 2015	FW	(Argentina) Paulo Dybala	21	(Italy) Palermo	€32M + €8M in variables		
9 June 2015	MF	(Germany) Sami Khedira	28	(Spain) Real Madrid	Free		
22 June 2015	FW	(Croatia) Mario Mandžukić	29	(Spain) Atlético Madrid	€19M + €2M in variables		
1 July 2015	DF	(Italy) Daniele Rugani	20	(Italy) Empoli		Loan return	
3 July 2015	GK	(Brazil) Neto	25	(Italy) Fiorentina	Free		
7 July 2015	FW	(Italy) Simone Zaza	24	(Italy) Sassuolo	€18M		
13 July 2015	FW	(Argentina) Guido Vadalá	18	(Argentina) Boca Juniors	€3.5M	On loan until 2017	
20 August 2015	DF	(Brazil) Alex Sandro	24	(Portugal) Porto	€26M		
25 August 2015	FW	(Colombia) Juan Cuadrado	27	(England) Chelsea	€1.5M	On loan until 2016	
31 August 2015	MF	(Gabon) Mario Lemina	21	(France) Marseille	€0.5M + €1M in variables	On loan until 2016, with an option to buy for an extra €9.5M	
31 August 2015	MF	(Brazil) Hernanes	30	(Italy) Internazionale	€11M + €2M in variables		

==== Out ====
Date	Pos.	Player	Age	Moving to	Fee	Notes	Source
30 June 2015	MF	(Italy) Rômulo	28	(Italy) Hellas Verona		Loan return	
30 June 2015	FW	(Italy) Alessandro Matri	30	(Italy) Milan		Loan return	
3 July 2015	GK	(Italy) Marco Storari	38	(Italy) Cagliari	Free		
6 July 2015	MF	(Italy) Andrea Pirlo	36	(United States) New York City	Free		
8 July 2015	MF	(Italy) Luca Marrone	25	(Italy) Carpi		On loan until 2016	
10 July 2015	DF	(Italy) Angelo Ogbonna	27	(England) West Ham United	€11M		
13 July 2015	FW	(Argentina) Carlos Tevez	31	(Argentina) Boca Juniors	€6.5M		
28 July 2015	MF	(Chile) Arturo Vidal	28	(Germany) Bayern Munich	€37M+3M variables		
11 August 2015	FW	(Italy) Simone Pepe	31	(Italy) Chievo	Free		
27 August 2015	FW	(Spain) Fernando Llorente	41	(Spain) Sevilla	Free		
30 August 2015	FW	(France) Kingsley Coman	19	(Germany) Bayern Munich	€7M	On loan until 2017, with an option to buy for an extra €21M	
31 August 2015	MF	(Chile) Mauricio Isla	27	(France) Marseille		On loan until 2016, with an option to buy for an extra €7M	
31 August 2015	DF	(Italy) Paolo De Ceglie	28	(France) Marseille		On loan until 2016	

==== Other acquisitions ====
Date	Pos.	Player	Age	Moving from	Fee	Notes	Source
23 June 2015	MF	(Argentina) Roberto Pereyra	24	(Italy) Udinese	€14M	Bought out loan from Udinese	
25 June 2015	DF	(Italy) Luca Barlocco	20	(Italy) Atalanta		Co-ownership termination	
25 June 2015	FW	(Italy) Davide Cais	21	(Italy) Atalanta		Co-ownership termination	
25 June 2015	GK	(Italy) Vincenzo Fiorillo	25	(Italy) Sampdoria		Co-ownership termination	
25 June 2015	FW	(Italy) Eric Lanini	21	(Italy) Palermo		Co-ownership termination	
25 June 2015	FW	(Senegal) Mame Baba Thiam	22	(Italy) Virtus Lanciano		Co-ownership termination	
1 July 2015	MF	(Chile) Mauricio Isla	27	(England) Queens Park Rangers		Loan return	
1 July 2015	MF	(Italy) Federico Mattiello	19	(Italy) Chievo		Loan return	
1 July 2015	MF	(Colombia) Andrés Tello	18	(Colombia) Envigado	€1.2M	Bought out loan from Envigado	
15 July 2015	FW	(Italy) Alberto Cerri	19	(Italy) Parma	Free		

==== Other disposals ====
Date	Pos.	Player	Age	Moving to	Fee	Notes	Source
25 June 2015	FW	(Italy) Domenico Berardi	20	(Italy) Sassuolo	€10M	Co-ownership termination	
25 June 2015	FW	(Ghana) Richmond Boakye	22	(Italy) Atalanta		Co-ownership termination	
25 June 2015	FW	(Italy) Edoardo Ceria	20	(Italy) Atalanta		Co-ownership termination	
25 June 2015	MF	(Italy) Simone Emmanuello	21	(Italy) Atalanta		Co-ownership termination	
25 June 2015	DF	(Italy) Edoardo Goldaniga	21	(Italy) Palermo		Co-ownership termination	
25 June 2015	MF	(Italy) Simone Russini	19	(Italy) Ternana	€0.15M	Co-ownership termination	
25 June 2015	FW	(Italy) Alberto Libertazzi	23	(Italy) Novara		Co-ownership termination	
27 June 2015	GK	(Romania) Laurențiu Brănescu	21	(Cyprus) Omonia		On loan until 2016	
1 July 2015	FW	(Italy) Cristian Bunino	18	(Italy) Pro Vercelli		On loan until 2016	
2 July 2015	GK	(Italy) Alberto Brignoli	23	(Italy) Sampdoria		On loan until 2016	
3 July 2015	MF	(Italy) Federico Mattiello	19	(Italy) Chievo		On loan until 2016	
3 July 2015	DF	(Switzerland) Joel Untersee	21	(Liechtenstein) Vaduz		On loan until 2016	
8 July 2015	DF	(Italy) Filippo Penna	20	(Italy) Lanciano		Full ownership	
8 July 2015	MF	(Italy) Marco Di Benedetto	19	(Italy) Lanciano		Full ownership	
11 July 2015	DF	(Denmark) Frederik Sørensen	23	(Germany) 1. FC Köln	€2.5M		
11 July 2015	DF	(Spain) Marcelo Djaló	21	(Spain) Girona		On loan until 2016	
13 July 2015	GK	(Italy) Nicola Leali	22	(Italy) Frosinone		On loan until 2016	
14 July 2015	DF	(Italy) Nicolò Curti	20	(Italy) Pontedera		On loan until 2016	
14 July 2015	GK	(Italy) Leonardo Citti	20	(Italy) Pontedera		On loan until 2016	
14 July 2015	MF	(Albania) Elvis Kabashi	21	(Italy) Pontedera		On loan until 2016	
15 July 2015	FW	(Ghana) Alhassane Soumah	19	(Hungary) Videoton		On loan until 2016	
16 July 2015	MF	(Italy) Gregorio Luperini	21	(Italy) Pro Vercelli		On loan until 2016	
18 July 2015	MF	(Italy) Andrea Schiavone	22	(Italy) Livorno		On loan until 2016	
19 July 2015	FW	(Italy) Stefano Beltrame	22	(Italy) Pro Vercelli		On loan until 2016	
20 July 2015	FW	(Greece) Anastasios Donis	18	(Switzerland) Lugano		On loan until 2016	
21 July 2015	FW	(Italy) Valerio Rosseti	20	(Italy) Cesena		On loan until 2016	
21 July 2015	FW	(Italy) Eric Lanini	21	(Italy) Virtus Lanciano		On loan until 2016	
21 July 2015	FW	(Italy) Stefano Padovan	21	(Italy) Virtus Lanciano		On loan until 2016	
22 July 2015	GK	(Italy) Francesco Anacoura	20	(Italy) Rimini		On loan until 2016	
23 July 2015	MF	(Italy) Leonardo Spinazzola	22	(Italy) Perugia		On loan until 2016	
23 July 2015	GK	(Italy) Vincenzo Fiorillo	25	(Italy) Pescara		On loan until 2016	
24 July 2015	MF	(Italy) Carlo Ilari	23	(Italy) Santarcangelo		On loan until 2016	
26 July 2015	FW	(Senegal) Mame Thiam	22	(Belgium) Zulte Waregem		On loan until 2016	
27 July 2015	DF	(Spain) Pol García	20	(Italy) Como		On loan until 2016	
29 July 2015	DF	(Italy) Alessandro Degrassi	19	(Italy) Delta Rovigo		On loan until 2016	
29 July 2015	MF	(Italy) Andrea Giannarelli	18	(Italy) Pisa		On loan until 2016	
29 July 2015	MF	(Italy) Lorenzo Benucci	18	(Italy) Prato		On loan until 2016	
30 July 2015	GK	(Italy) Carlo Pinsoglio	25	(Italy) Livorno		On loan until 2016	
31 July 2015	MF	(Italy) Matteo Gerbaudo	20	(Italy) Carrarese		On loan until 2016	
31 July 2015	DF	(Italy) Christian Tavanti	20	(Italy) Carrarese		On loan until 2016	
31 July 2015	DF	(Italy) Luca Barlocco	20	(Italy) Carrarese		On loan until 2016	
31 July 2015	FW	(Italy) Davide Cais	21	(Italy) Carrarese		On loan until 2016	
31 July 2015	FW	(Switzerland) Zoran Josipovic	19	(Switzerland) Lugano		On loan until 2016, terminated on Jan 12 2016	
4 August 2015	MF	(Brazil) Gabriel Pires	21	(Spain) Leganés		On loan until 2016	
6 August 2015	DF	(Italy) Nazzareno Belfasti	22	(Italy) FeralpiSalò		On loan until 2016	
15 August 2015	FW	(Senegal) Mbaye Diagne	23	(Hungary) Újpest		On loan until 2016	
17 August 2015	GK	(Italy) Alberto Gallinetta	21	(Belgium) Brugge		On loan until 2016	
19 August 2015	MF	(Norway) Vajebah Sakor	19	(Belgium) Westerlo		On loan until 2016	
21 August 2015	FW	(Italy) Alberto Cerri	19	(Italy) Cagliari		On loan until 2016	
23 August 2015	FW	(Italy) Davide Arras	17	(Italy) Cagliari		On loan until 2016	
25 August 2015	MF	(Colombia) Andrés Tello	18	(Italy) Cagliari		On loan until 2016	
25 August 2015	DF	(Italy) Federico Giovanni	18	(Italy) Delta Rovigo		On loan until 2016	
26 August 2015	FW	(Morocco) Younes Marzouk	19	(Belgium) Westerlo		On loan until 2016	
26 August 2015	DF	(Italy) Matteo Liviero	22	(Italy) Lecce		On loan until 2016	
29 August 2015	FW	(Italy) Francesco Margiotta	22	(Italy) Santarcangelo		On loan until 2016	
31 August 2015	FW	(Italy) Cristian Pasquato	26	(Italy) Livorno		On loan until 2016	
31 August 2015	FW	(Italy) Cristian Bunino	19	(Italy) Livorno		On loan until 2016	
31 August 2015	GK	(Italy) Timothy Nocchi	25	(Italy) Carrarese		On loan until 2016	
31 August 2015	MF	(Italy) Michele Cavion	20	(Italy) Carrarese		On loan until 2016	
31 August 2015	MF	(Italy) Fausto Rossi	24	(Italy) Pro Vercelli		On loan until 2016	
31 August 2015	MF	(Liechtenstein) Marcel Büchel	24	(Italy) Empoli		On loan until 2016	
31 August 2015	MF	(Netherlands) Ouasim Bouy	22	(Netherlands) Zwolle		On loan until 2016	
31 August 2015	MF	(Lithuania) Vykintas Slivka	20	(Netherlands) Den Bosch		On loan until 2016	
31 August 2015	DF	(Romania) Vlad Marin	20	(Italy) Rimini		On loan until 2016	
31 August 2015	MF	(Australia) James Troisi	27	(Saudi Arabia) Ittihad	Free		
31 August 2015	DF	(Iceland) Hörður Magnússon	22	(Italy) Cesena		On loan until 2016	

Total expenditure: €125,700,000

Total revenue: €74,000,000

Net income: ▼€51,700,000

=== Winter 2015–16 ===
==== Other acquisitions ====
Date	Pos.	Player	Age	Moving from	Fee	Notes	Source
9 January 2016	FW	(Italy) Alessio Di Massimo	19	(Italy) Sant'Omero	€0.3M	On loan until 2016, with an option to buy	
12 January 2016	FW	(Italy) Giacomo Galvagno	15	(Italy) Fossano		On loan until 2016, with an option to buy	
19 January 2016	MF	(Italy) Rolando Mandragora	18	(Italy) Genoa	€6M + €6M in variables		

==== Other disposals ====
Date	Pos.	Player	Age	Moving to	Fee	Notes	Source
7 January 2016	MF	(Italy) Stefano Barilli	18	(Italy) Correggese		On loan until 2016	
12 January 2016	FW	(Switzerland) Zoran Josipovic	20	(Switzerland) FC Aarau		On loan until 2016	
14 January 2016	MF	(Italy) Mattia Vitale	18	(Italy) Lanciano		On loan until 2016, with an option to buy	
14 January 2016	FW	(Italy) King Udoh	18	(Italy) Lanciano		On loan until 2016, with an option to buy	
19 January 2016	MF	(Italy) Rolando Mandragora	18	(Italy) Pescara		On loan until 2016	
1 February 2016	DF	(Italy) Riccardo Santoro	20	(Italy) Chieri		On loan until 2016	

Total expenditure: €6,000,000

Total revenue: €0

Net income: ▼€6,000,000

== Pre-season and friendlies ==
25 July 2015 Friendly	Borussia Dortmund	2–0	Juventus	St. Gallen, Switzerland
19:05 CEST (UTC+02:00)	Aubameyang 40'; Reus 64'	Report		Stadium: AFG Arena; Attendance: 18,300; Referee: Adrien Jaccottet (Switzerland)

29 July 2015 Friendly	Lechia Gdańsk	1–2	Juventus	Gdańsk, Poland
17:00 CEST (UTC+02:00)	Buksa 82'	Report	Pogba 4'; Mandžukić 90'	Stadium: PGE Arena Gdańsk; Attendance: 26,000; Referee: Dominik Sulikowski (Poland)

1 August 2015 Friendly	Marseille	2–0	Juventus	Marseille, France
19:00 CEST (UTC+02:00)	Alessandrini 35'; Barrada 84'	Report	Lichtsteiner (red card) 44'	Stadium: Stade Vélodrome

19 August 2015 Villar Perosa	Juventus	1–0^{[A]}	Juventus Primavera	Villar Perosa
	Pogba 42'	Report		Attendance: >5,000

== Competitions ==
=== Supercoppa Italiana ===
8 August 2015	Juventus	2–0	Lazio	Shanghai, China
14:00 CEST (UTC+02:00)	Mandžukić 69'; Dybala 73'	Report		Stadium: Shanghai Stadium; Attendance: 30,000; Referee: Luca Banti

=== Serie A ===
==== League table ====
Pos	Team	Pld	W	D	L	GF	GA	GD	Pts	Qualification or relegation
1	Juventus (C)	38	29	4	5	75	20	+55	91	Qualification to Champions League group stage
2	Napoli	38	25	7	6	80	32	+48	82	Qualification to Champions League group stage
3	Roma	38	23	11	4	83	41	+42	80	Qualification to Champions League play-off round
4	Internazionale	38	20	7	11	50	38	+12	67	Qualification to Europa League group stage (Note: Since the winners of the 2015–16 Coppa Italia, Juventus, qualified for European competition based on league position, the spot awarded to the cup winners (Europa League group stage) was passed to fifth-placed team and the spot awarded to the fifth-placed team (Europa League third qualifying round) was passed to the sixth-placed team.)
5	Fiorentina	38	18	10	10	60	42	+18	64	Qualification to Europa League group stage

Source: Serie A, Soccerway
Rules for classification: 1) Points; 2) Head-to-head points; 3) Head-to-head goal difference; 4) Goal difference; 5) Goals scored; 6) Draw.
(C) Champions

==== Results summary ====
Overall								Home						Away					
Pld	W	D	L	GF	GA	GD	Pts	W	D	L	GF	GA	GD	W	D	L	GF	GA	GD
38	29	4	5	75	20	+55	91	16	2	1	37	6	+31	13	2	4	38	14	+24

Last updated: 14 May 2016.
Source: Competitive matches

==== Results by round ====
Round	1	2	3	4	5	6	7	8	9	10	11	12	13	14	15	16	17	18	19	20	21	22	23	24	25	26	27	28	29	30	31	32	33	34	35	36	37	38
Ground	H	A	H	A	H	A	H	A	H	A	H	A	H	A	A	H	A	H	A	A	H	A	H	A	H	A	H	A	H	A	H	A	H	H	A	H	A	H
Result	L	L	D	W	D	L	W	D	W	L	W	W	W	W	W	W	W	W	W	W	W	W	W	W	W	D	W	W	W	W	W	W	W	W	W	W	L	W
Position	17	17	16	13	13	15	12	14	12	12	10	7	6	5	5	4	4	4	2	2	2	2	2	2	1	1	1	1	1	1	1	1	1	1	1	1	1	1

Updated to match(es) played on 14 May 2016. Source: Competitive matches
A = Away; H = Home; W = Win; D = Draw; L = Loss

==== Matches ====
23 August 2015 1	Juventus	0–1	Udinese	Turin
18:00 CEST (UTC+02:00)	Padoin (yellow card) 39'	Report	Piris (yellow card) 15'; Heurtaux (yellow card) 35'; Théréau 78'; Ali Adnan (yellow card) 80'	Stadium: Juventus Stadium; Attendance: 38,697; Referee: Paolo Mazzoleni

30 August 2015 2	Roma	2–1	Juventus	Rome
18:00 CEST (UTC+02:00)	Pjanić (yellow card) 57', (goal) 61'; De Rossi (yellow card) 63'; Džeko (yellow card) 76', (goal) 79'	Report	Pogba (yellow card) 22'; Chiellini (yellow card) 37'; Rubinho (red card) 65'; Evra (yellow card) 74' (yellow-red card) 77'; Dybala 87'	Stadium: Stadio Olimpico; Attendance: 55,040; Referee: Nicola Rizzoli
Note: Rubinho was sent off for dissent while a substitute.

12 September 2015 3	Juventus	1–1	Chievo	Turin
20:45 CEST (UTC+02:00)	Hernanes (yellow card) 35'; Alex Sandro (yellow card) 49'; Dybala 83' (pen.); Cuadrado (yellow card) 90+1'	Report	Hetemaj 5'; Castro (yellow card) 21'; Birsa (yellow card) 50'; Cesar (yellow card) 78'; Pepe (yellow card) 81'; Bizzarri (yellow card) 90+2'	Stadium: Juventus Stadium; Attendance: 29,250; Referee: Marco Guida

20 September 2015 4	Genoa	0–2	Juventus	Genoa
15:00 CEST (UTC+02:00)	Izzo (yellow card) 26' (yellow-red card) 44'; Džemaili (yellow card) 50'	Report	Evra (yellow card) 17'; Lamanna 37' (o.g.); Pogba 60' (pen.), (yellow card) 61'; Lemina (yellow card) 61'; Zaza (yellow card) 86'	Stadium: Stadio Luigi Ferraris; Attendance: 25,115; Referee: Paolo Valeri

23 September 2015 5	Juventus	1–1	Frosinone	Turin
20:45 CEST (UTC+02:00)	Bonucci (yellow card) 46'; Zaza 50', (yellow card) 67'	Report	Crivello (yellow card) 32'; Soddimo (yellow card) 36'; Rosi (yellow card) 84'; Blanchard 90+2'	Stadium: Juventus Stadium; Attendance: 36,646; Referee: Angelo Cervellera

26 September 2015 6	Napoli	2–1	Juventus	Naples
20:45 CEST (UTC+02:00)	Insigne 26'; Ghoulam (yellow card) 50'; Callejón (yellow card) 55'; Higuaín 62'	Report	Bonucci (yellow card) 51'; Evra (yellow card) 53'; Lemina 63'; Padoin (yellow card) 87'; Morata (yellow card) 90+3'	Stadium: Stadio San Paolo; Attendance: 40,311; Referee: Daniele Orsato

4 October 2015 7	Juventus	3–1	Bologna	Turin
18:00 CEST (UTC+02:00)	Morata 33'; Dybala 53' (pen.); Khedira 63'; Lemina (yellow card) 83'	Report	Mounier 5', (yellow card) 45+1'; Destro (yellow card) 40'; Gastaldello (yellow card) 42'; Masina (yellow card) 50'; Pulgar (yellow card) 56'	Stadium: Juventus Stadium; Attendance: 39,330; Referee: Domenico Celi

18 October 2015 8	Internazionale	0–0	Juventus	Milan
20:45 CEST (UTC+02:00)	Melo (yellow card) 8'; Brozović (yellow card) 78'; Miranda (yellow card) 90+1'	Report	Marchisio (yellow card) 7'; Khedira (yellow card) 11'; Zaza (yellow card) 16'; Evra (yellow card) 60'; Chiellini (yellow card) 86'	Stadium: San Siro; Attendance: 79,154; Referee: Paolo Valeri

25 October 2015 9	Juventus	2–0	Atalanta	Turin
15:00 CET (UTC+01:00)	Dybala 28', (yellow card) 61'; Mandžukić 49'; Marchisio (yellow card) 51'	Report	De Roon (yellow card) 25'; Grassi (yellow card) 54'; Tolói (yellow card) 57' (yellow-red card) 73'	Stadium: Juventus Stadium; Attendance: 38,720; Referee: Marco Di Bello

28 October 2015 10	Sassuolo	1–0	Juventus	Reggio Emilia
20:45 CET (UTC+01:00)	Peluso (yellow card) 13'; Sansone 20', (yellow card) 90+4'; Pegolo (yellow card) 60'; Berardi (yellow card) 68'; Cannavaro (yellow card) 82'	Report	Chiellini (yellow card) 4' (yellow-red card) 39'; Lemina (yellow card) 18'; Pogba (yellow card) 77'	Stadium: Mapei Stadium – Città del Tricolore; Attendance: 20,570; Referee: Andrea Gervasoni

31 October 2015 11	Juventus	2–1	Torino	Turin
18:00 CET (UTC+01:00)	Pogba 19', (yellow card) 81'; Morata (yellow card) 27'; Cuadrado 90+3'	Report	Acquah (yellow card) 21'; Bovo (yellow card) 21', (goal) 51'; Baselli (yellow card) 37'; Zappacosta (yellow card) 76'; Peres (yellow card) 90'	Stadium: Juventus Stadium; Attendance: 39,828; Referee: Gianluca Rocchi

8 November 2015 12	Empoli	1–3	Juventus	Empoli
15:00 CET (UTC+01:00)	Maccarone 19'; Mário Rui (yellow card) 58'; Krunić (yellow card) 69'	Report	Mandžukić 32'; Evra 38'; Morata (yellow card) 51'; Buffon (yellow card) 60'; Marchisio (yellow card) 81'; Dybala 84'	Stadium: Stadio Carlo Castellani; Attendance: 14,693; Referee: Davide Massa

21 November 2015 13	Juventus	1–0	Milan	Turin
20:45 CET (UTC+01:00)	Sturaro (yellow card) 28'; Lichtsteiner (yellow card) 50'; Dybala 65'	Report	Kucka (yellow card) 31'; Alex (yellow card) 53'	Stadium: Juventus Stadium; Attendance: 40,841; Referee: Paolo Mazzoleni

29 November 2015 14	Palermo	0–3	Juventus	Palermo
20:45 CET (UTC+01:00)	Struna (yellow card) 50'; Vázquez (yellow card) 76'	Report	Pogba (yellow card) 25'; Mandžukić 54'; Barzagli (yellow card) 61'; Sturaro (yellow card) 76', (goal) 89'; Zaza 90+3'	Stadium: Stadio Renzo Barbera; Attendance: 25,737; Referee: Paolo Valeri

4 December 2015 15	Lazio	0–2	Juventus	Rome
20:45 CET (UTC+01:00)	Gentiletti (yellow card) 15'; Maurício (yellow card) 37'; Parolo (yellow card) 60'; Klose (yellow card) 84'	Report	Gentiletti 7' (o.g.); Mandžukić (yellow card) 26'; Dybala 32'; Alex Sandro (yellow card) 68'; Evra (yellow card) 75'	Stadium: Stadio Olimpico; Attendance: 27,740; Referee: Luca Banti

13 December 2015 16	Juventus	3–1	Fiorentina	Turin
20:45 CET (UTC+01:00)	Cuadrado 6'; Pogba (yellow card) 52'; Mandžukić (yellow card) 72', (goal) 80'; Marchisio (yellow card) 75'; Dybala 90+1'	Report	Iličić 3' (pen.), (yellow card) 68'; Alonso (yellow card) 34'; Valero (yellow card) 57'; Vecino (yellow card) 72'; Pasqual (yellow card) 90+1'	Stadium: Juventus Stadium; Attendance: 38,044; Referee: Daniele Orsato

20 December 2015 17	Carpi	2–3	Juventus	Modena
12:30 CET (UTC+01:00)	Borriello 15'; Gabriel Silva (yellow card) 78'; Bonucci 90+2' (o.g.)	Report	Mandžukić 18', 41'; Pogba 50'	Stadium: Stadio Alberto Braglia; Attendance: 17,755; Referee: Piero Giacomelli

6 January 2016 18	Juventus	3–0	Hellas Verona	Turin
15:00 CET (UTC+01:00)	Dybala 8'; Bonucci 45'; Marchisio (yellow card) 45+2'; Alex Sandro (yellow card) 60'; Sturaro (yellow card) 80'; Zaza 82'	Report	Greco (yellow card) 24'; Hallfreðsson (yellow card) 48'	Stadium: Juventus Stadium; Attendance: 40,171; Referee: Gianpaolo Calvarese

10 January 2016 19	Sampdoria	1–2	Juventus	Genoa
20:45 CET (UTC+01:00)	Cassano 64'; Cassani (yellow card) 67'; Carbonero (yellow card) 90+2'; Moisander (red card) 90+4'	Report	Pogba 17', (yellow card) 47'; Bonucci (yellow card) 39'; Khedira 46', (yellow card) 90'; Hernanes (yellow card) 88'	Stadium: Stadio Luigi Ferraris; Attendance: 25,024; Referee: Paolo Mazzoleni

17 January 2016 20	Udinese	0–4	Juventus	Udine
15:00 CET (UTC+01:00)	Badu (yellow card) 13'; Danilo (red card) 25'	Report	Chiellini (yellow card) 11'; Dybala 15', 26' (pen.); Khedira 18'; Alex Sandro 42'	Stadium: Stadio Friuli; Attendance: 25,467; Referee: Gianluca Rocchi

24 January 2016 21	Juventus	1–0	Roma	Turin
20:45 CET (UTC+01:00)	Mandžukić (yellow card) 51'; Dybala 77'; Evra (yellow card) 88'	Report	De Rossi (yellow card) 9'; Rüdiger (yellow card) 14'; Pjanić (yellow card) 51'; Nainggolan (yellow card) 90+3'	Stadium: Juventus Stadium; Attendance: 39,721; Referee: Luca Banti

31 January 2016 22	Chievo	0–4	Juventus	Verona
12:30 CET (UTC+01:00)	Radovanović (yellow card) 9'; Sardo (yellow card) 54'; Pinzi (yellow card) 85'	Report	Morata 6', 40'; Alex Sandro (yellow card) 20', (goal) 61'; Pogba 67'; Hernanes (yellow card) 84'	Stadium: Stadio Marc'Antonio Bentegodi; Attendance: 25,000; Referee: Daniele Doveri

3 February 2016 23	Juventus	1–0	Genoa	Turin
20:45 CET (UTC+01:00)	De Maio 30' (o.g.); Bonucci (yellow card) 39'; Zaza (red card) 90+1'	Report	Muñoz (yellow card) 34'; Capel (yellow card) 64'; Rigoni (yellow card) 73'	Stadium: Juventus Stadium; Attendance: 37,605; Referee: Carmine Russo

7 February 2016 24	Frosinone	0–2	Juventus	Frosinone
15:00 CET (UTC+01:00)	Crivello (yellow card) 53'; Sammarco (yellow card) 76'; Soddimo (yellow card) 90+5'	Report	Cuadrado 73'; Morata (yellow card) 82'; Dybala 90+1'	Stadium: Stadio Matusa; Attendance: 7,954; Referee: Davide Massa

13 February 2016 25	Juventus	1–0	Napoli	Turin
20:45 CET (UTC+01:00)	Pogba (yellow card) 67'; Marchisio (yellow card) 86'; Zaza 88'	Report	Callejón (yellow card) 63'; Mertens (yellow card) 90+4'	Stadium: Juventus Stadium; Attendance: 41,305; Referee: Daniele Orsato

19 February 2016 26	Bologna	0–0	Juventus	Bologna
20:45 CET (UTC+01:00)	Gastaldello (yellow card) 33'; Diawara (yellow card) 90+3'	Report	Sturaro (yellow card) 41'; Marchisio (yellow card) 45'	Stadium: Stadio Renato Dall'Ara; Attendance: 29,463; Referee: Massimiliano Irrati

28 February 2016 27	Juventus	2–0	Internazionale	Turin
20:45 CET (UTC+01:00)	Lichtsteiner (yellow card) 39'; Hernanes (yellow card) 45'; Bonucci 47'; Khedira (yellow card) 59'; Morata 84' (pen.)	Report	Juan Jesus (yellow card) 58'	Stadium: Juventus Stadium; Attendance: 40,204; Referee: Gianluca Rocchi

6 March 2016 28	Atalanta	0–2	Juventus	Bergamo
15:00 CET (UTC+01:00)	Cigarini (yellow card) 2'; Paletta (yellow card) 51'; Tolói (yellow card) 85'	Report	Barzagli 24'; Pogba (yellow card) 43'; Marchisio (yellow card) 81'; Lemina 86'	Stadium: Stadio Atleti Azzurri d'Italia; Attendance: 19,770; Referee: Paolo Valeri

11 March 2016 29	Juventus	1–0	Sassuolo	Turin
20:45 CET (UTC+01:00)	Dybala 36'	Report	Duncan (yellow card) 23'; Sansone (yellow card) 41'; Vrsaljko (yellow card) 55'	Stadium: Juventus Stadium; Attendance: 39,240; Referee: Domenico Celi

20 March 2016 30	Torino	1–4	Juventus	Turin
15:00 CET (UTC+01:00)	Acquah (yellow card) 19'; Glik (yellow card) 31'; Silva (yellow card) 36'; Belotti 48' (pen.), (yellow card) 68'	Report	Alex Sandro (yellow card) 17'; Pogba 33'; Khedira 42', (red card) 87'; Lichtsteiner (yellow card) 44'; Bonucci (yellow card) 47'; Morata 63', 76'	Stadium: Stadio Olimpico di Torino; Attendance: 24,428; Referee: Nicola Rizzoli

2 April 2016 31	Juventus	1–0	Empoli	Turin
20:45 CEST (UTC+02:00)	Mandžukić 44'; Lichtsteiner (yellow card) 45+1'; Zaza (yellow card) 67'	Report	Paredes (yellow card) 53'; Tonelli (yellow card) 86'	Stadium: Juventus Stadium; Attendance: 39,260; Referee: Gianpaolo Calvarese

9 April 2016 32	Milan	1–2	Juventus	Milan
20:45 CEST (UTC+02:00)	Alex 18', (yellow card) 59'; Balotelli (yellow card) 51'; Kucka (yellow card) 61'; Antonelli (yellow card) 89'	Report	Asamoah (yellow card) 20'; Mandžukić 27', (yellow card) 50'; Pogba 65'; Zaza (yellow card) 86'	Stadium: San Siro; Attendance: 75,393; Referee: Daniele Orsato

17 April 2016 33	Juventus	4–0	Palermo	Turin
15:00 CEST (UTC+02:00)	Khedira 10'; Barzagli (yellow card) 29'; Pogba 71'; Cuadrado 74'; Morata (yellow card) 86'; Padoin 89'	Report	Hiljemark (yellow card) 29'; Goldaniga (yellow card) 45+1'; González (yellow card) 52'	Stadium: Juventus Stadium; Attendance: 39,241; Referee: Piero Giacomelli

20 April 2016 34	Juventus	3–0	Lazio	Turin
20:45 CEST (UTC+02:00)	Mandžukić 39'; Dybala 52' (pen.), 64'; Sturaro (yellow card) 75'	Report	Patric (yellow card) 42' (yellow-red card) 48'; Lulić (yellow card) 52'	Stadium: Juventus Stadium; Attendance: 38,655; Referee: Paolo Mazzoleni

24 April 2016 35	Fiorentina	1–2	Juventus	Florence
20:45 CEST (UTC+02:00)	Gonzalo (yellow card) 58'; Kalinić 81'	Report	Mandžukić 39'; Rugani (yellow card) 72'; Morata 83', (yellow card) 83'; Cuadrado (yellow card) 90'	Stadium: Stadio Artemio Franchi; Attendance: 33,650; Referee: Paolo Tagliavento

1 May 2016 36	Juventus	2–0	Carpi	Turin
12:30 CEST (UTC+02:00)	Mandžukić (yellow card) 28'; Hernanes 42', (yellow card) 90+3'; Rugani (yellow card) 51'; Bonucci (yellow card) 66'; Zaza 80'; Lichtsteiner (yellow card) 90+1'; Pogba (yellow card) 90+1'	Report	Martinho (yellow card) 30'; Crimi (yellow card) 45+2'	Stadium: Juventus Stadium; Attendance: 40,316; Referee: Massimiliano Irrati

8 May 2016 37	Hellas Verona	2–1	Juventus	Verona
20:45 CEST (UTC+02:00)	Siligardi (yellow card) 16'; Marrone (yellow card) 32'; Toni 43' (pen.); Viviani 55'; Helander (yellow card) 90+4'	Report	Zaza (yellow card) 26'; Alex Sandro (yellow card) 42' (yellow-red card) 90+2'; Lemina (yellow card) 51'; Dybala 90+4' (pen.)	Stadium: Stadio Marc'Antonio Bentegodi; Attendance: 23,423; Referee: Fabio Maresca

14 May 2016 38	Juventus	5–0	Sampdoria	Turin
17:00 CEST (UTC+02:00)	Evra 6'; Dybala 15' (pen.), 37'; Chiellini (yellow card) 21', (goal) 77'; Hernanes (yellow card) 35'; Sturaro (yellow card) 72'; Bonucci 85'	Report	Škriniar (red card) 14'; Sala (yellow card) 37'	Stadium: Juventus Stadium; Attendance: 39,272; Referee: Claudio Gavillucci

=== Coppa Italia ===
16 December 2015 Round of 16	Juventus	4–0	Torino	Turin
20:45 CET (UTC+01:00)	Zaza (yellow card) 23', (goal) 28', 51'; Marchisio (yellow card) 39'; Dybala 73'; Pogba 82'	Report	Molinaro (yellow card) 35' (yellow-red card) 49'; Acquah (yellow card) 42'	Stadium: Juventus Stadium; Attendance: 32,863; Referee: Daniele Doveri

20 January 2016 Quarter-finals	Lazio	0–1	Juventus	Rome
20:45 CET (UTC+01:00)	Lulić (yellow card) 31'; Maurício (yellow card) 55'; Konko (yellow card) 60'	Report	Chiellini (yellow card) 44'; Lichtsteiner 66'; Zaza (yellow card) 90'; Dybala (yellow card) 90+3'	Stadium: Stadio Olimpico; Attendance: 30,799; Referee: Antonio Damato

27 January 2016 Semi-finals; First leg	Juventus	3–0	Internazionale	Turin
20:45 CET (UTC+01:00)	Bonucci (yellow card) 18'; Morata 36' (pen.), 63'; Dybala 84'	Report	Murillo (yellow card) 34' (yellow-red card) 70'; Miranda (yellow card) 45+1'; Kondogbia (yellow card) 89'	Stadium: Juventus Stadium; Attendance: 39,441; Referee: Paolo Tagliavento

2 March 2016 Semi-finals; Second leg	Internazionale	3–0 (a.e.t.) (3–3 agg.) (3–5 p)	Juventus	Milan
20:45 CET (UTC+01:00)	Brozović 17', 82' (pen.); Juan Jesus (yellow card) 24'; Perišić 49', (yellow card) 90+2'; D'Ambrosio (yellow card) 90+1'; Éder (yellow card) 102'; Santon (yellow card) 106'	Report	Sturaro (yellow card) 37'; Bonucci (yellow card) 41'; Cuadrado (yellow card) 90+2'; Lemina (yellow card) 93'; Pogba (yellow card) 98'; Zaza (yellow card) 109'	Stadium: San Siro; Attendance: 29,357; Referee: Andrea Gervasoni
	Penalties
	Brozović (penalty scored); Palacio (penalty missed); Manaj (penalty scored); Nagatomo (penalty scored)		(penalty scored) Barzagli; (penalty scored) Zaza; (penalty scored) Morata; (penalty scored) Pogba; (penalty scored) Bonucci

21 May 2016 Final	Milan	0–1 (a.e.t.)	Juventus	Rome
20:45 CEST (UTC+02:00)	Zapata (yellow card) 50'; Honda (yellow card) 88'; Niang (yellow card) 101'; Mauri (yellow card) 119'	Report	Pogba (yellow card) 62'; Barzagli (yellow card) 105'; Morata 110', (yellow card) 119'; Chiellini (yellow card) 117'; Rugani (yellow card) 120+2'	Stadium: Stadio Olimpico; Attendance: 66,555; Referee: Gianluca Rocchi

=== UEFA Champions League ===
==== Group stage ====
Pos	Team	Pld	W	D	L	GF	GA	GD	Pts	Qualification	MCI	JUV	SEV	BMG
1	(England) Manchester City	6	4	0	2	12	8	+4	12	Advance to knockout phase	—	1–2	2–1	4–2
2	(Italy) Juventus	6	3	2	1	6	3	+3	11	Advance to knockout phase	1–0	—	2–0	0–0
3	(Spain) Sevilla	6	2	0	4	8	11	−3	6	Transfer to Europa League	1–3	1–0	—	3–0
4	(Germany) Borussia Mönchengladbach	6	1	2	3	8	12	−4	5		1–2	1–1	4–2	—

Source: UEFA
Rules for classification: Group stage tiebreakers

15 September 2015 1	Manchester City (England)	1–2	(Italy) Juventus	Manchester, England
20:45 CEST (UTC+02:00)	Chiellini 57' (o.g.)	Report	Mandžukić 70'; Morata 81'	Stadium: City of Manchester Stadium; Attendance: 50,363; Referee: Damir Skomina (Slovenia)

30 September 2015 2	Juventus (Italy)	2–0	(Spain) Sevilla	Turin, Italy
20:45 CEST (UTC+02:00)	Morata 41'; Zaza 87'	Report	Coke (yellow card) 78'	Stadium: Juventus Stadium; Attendance: 36,499; Referee: Jonas Eriksson (Sweden)

21 October 2015 3	Juventus (Italy)	0–0	(Germany) Borussia Mönchengladbach	Turin, Italy
20:45 CEST (UTC+02:00)	Chiellini (yellow card) 90+2'	Report	Domínguez (yellow card) 42'; Wendt (yellow card) 62'; Xhaka (yellow card) 77'	Stadium: Juventus Stadium; Attendance: 40,940; Referee: Craig Thomson (Scotland)

3 November 2015 4	Borussia Mönchengladbach (Germany)	1–1	(Italy) Juventus	Mönchengladbach, Germany
20:45 CET (UTC+01:00)	Johnson 18'	Report	Lichtsteiner 44'; Hernanes (red card) 53'; Marchisio (yellow card) 56'; Dybala (yellow card) 63'; Sturaro (yellow card) 67'	Stadium: Borussia-Park; Attendance: 46,217; Referee: Björn Kuipers (Netherlands)

25 November 2015 5	Juventus (Italy)	1–0	(England) Manchester City	Turin, Italy
20:45 CET (UTC+01:00)	Mandžukić 18'	Report	Fernandinho (yellow card) 35'; Navas (yellow card) 69'; Sagna (yellow card) 69'	Stadium: Juventus Stadium; Attendance: 38,193; Referee: Felix Brych (Germany)

8 December 2015 6	Sevilla (Spain)	1–0	(Italy) Juventus	Seville, Spain
20:45 CET (UTC+01:00)	Llorente 65'	Report	Alex Sandro (yellow card) 38'; Sturaro (yellow card) 49'	Stadium: Ramón Sánchez Pizjuán; Attendance: 35,583; Referee: Szymon Marciniak (Poland)

==== Knockout phase ====
===== Round of 16 =====
23 February 2016 First leg	Juventus (Italy)	2–2	(Germany) Bayern Munich	Turin, Italy
20:45 CET (UTC+01:00)	Dybala 63'; Sturaro 76'; Morata (yellow card) 79'	Report	Douglas Costa (yellow card) 20'; Müller 43'; Robben 55'; Lewandowski (yellow card) 70'; Vidal (yellow card) 90'	Stadium: Juventus Stadium; Attendance: 41,332; Referee: Martin Atkinson (England)

16 March 2016 Second leg	Bayern Munich (Germany)	4–2 (a.e.t.) (6–4 agg.)	(Italy) Juventus	Munich, Germany
20:45 CET (UTC+01:00)	Kimmich (yellow card) 43'; Vidal (yellow card) 48'; Lewandowski (yellow card) 51', (goal) 73'; Müller 90+1'; Thiago 108', (yellow card) 109'; Coman 110'; Bernat (yellow card) 112'	Report	Pogba 5'; Cuadrado 28', (yellow card) 71'; Khedira (yellow card) 29'; Morata (yellow card) 38'; Lichtsteiner (yellow card) 48'; Bonucci (yellow card) 53'; Pereyra (yellow card) 103'; Sturaro (yellow card) 112'	Stadium: Allianz Arena; Attendance: 70,000; Referee: Jonas Eriksson (Sweden)

== Statistics ==
=== Appearances and goals ===
No.	Pos	Nat	Player	Total		Serie A		Supercoppa Italiana		Coppa Italia		Champions League	
No.	Pos	Nat	Player	Apps	Goals	Apps	Goals	Apps	Goals	Apps	Goals	Apps	Goals
Goalkeepers
1	GK	(Italy) ITA	Gianluigi Buffon	44	0	35	0	1	0	0	0	8	0
25	GK	(Brazil) BRA	Neto	8	0	3	0	0	0	5	0	0	0
34	GK	(Brazil) BRA	Rubinho	0	0	0	0	0	0	0	0	0	0
38	GK	(Italy) ITA	Emil Audero	0	0	0	0	0	0	0	0	0	0
Defenders
3	DF	(Italy) ITA	Giorgio Chiellini	34	1	21+3	1	0	0	4	0	6	0
4	DF	(Uruguay) URU	Martín Cáceres	9	0	5+1	0	1	0	2	0	0	0
12	DF	(Brazil) BRA	Alex Sandro	32	2	15+7	2	0	0	3+2	0	4+1	0
15	DF	(Italy) ITA	Andrea Barzagli	42	1	31	1	1	0	1+1	0	6+2	0
19	DF	(Italy) ITA	Leonardo Bonucci	49	3	35+1	3	1	0	4	0	8	0
24	DF	(Italy) ITA	Daniele Rugani	21	0	11+6	0	0	0	3	0	0+1	0
26	DF	(Switzerland) SUI	Stephan Lichtsteiner	37	2	22+4	0	1	0	4	1	6	1
33	DF	(France) FRA	Patrice Evra	35	2	24+2	2	1	0	2	0	5+1	0
Midfielders
6	MF	(Germany) GER	Sami Khedira	25	5	20	5	0	0	1	0	4	0
8	MF	(Italy) ITA	Claudio Marchisio	32	0	23	0	1	0	3	0	5	0
10	MF	(France) FRA	Paul Pogba	49	10	33+2	8	1	0	4+1	1	8	1
11	MF	(Brazil) BRA	Hernanes	22	1	10+4	1	0	0	2+1	0	4+1	0
18	MF	(Gabon) GAB	Mario Lemina	13	2	7+3	2	0	0	1+1	0	0+1	0
20	MF	(Italy) ITA	Simone Padoin	14	1	6+6	1	0	0	0+2	0	0	0
22	MF	(Ghana) GHA	Kwadwo Asamoah	13	0	6+5	0	0	0	2	0	0	0
27	MF	(Italy) ITA	Stefano Sturaro	28	2	11+8	1	1	0	2	0	4+2	1
37	MF	(Argentina) ARG	Roberto Pereyra	16	0	9+4	0	0+1	0	0	0	0+2	0
Forwards
7	FW	(Italy) ITA	Simone Zaza	24	8	5+14	5	0	0	3	2	0+2	1
9	FW	(Spain) ESP	Álvaro Morata	47	12	16+18	7	0	0	4+1	3	6+2	2
16	FW	(Colombia) COL	Juan Cuadrado	40	5	16+12	4	0	0	2+2	0	5+3	1
17	FW	(Croatia) CRO	Mario Mandžukić	36	13	24+3	10	1	1	2+1	0	4+1	2
21	FW	(Argentina) ARG	Paulo Dybala	46	23	29+5	19	0+1	1	1+3	2	5+2	1
39	FW	(Italy) ITA	Andrea Favilli	1	0	0+1	0	0	0	0	0	0	0
Players transferred out during the season
18	DF	(Chile) CHI	Mauricio Isla	1	0	0+1	0	0	0	0	0	0	0
14	FW	(Spain) ESP	Fernando Llorente	2	0	0+1	0	0+1	0	0	0	0	0
29	FW	(France) FRA	Kingsley Coman	2	0	1	0	1	0	0	0	0	0

Last updated: 25 May 2016
Source: Competitions

=== Goalscorers ===
Rank	No.	Pos	Nat	Name	Serie A	Supercoppa	Coppa Italia	UEFA CL	Total
1	21	FW	(Argentina)	Paulo Dybala	19	1	2	1	23
2	17	FW	(Croatia)	Mario Mandžukić	10	1	0	2	13
3	9	FW	(Spain)	Álvaro Morata	7	0	3	2	12
4	10	MF	(France)	Paul Pogba	8	0	1	1	10
5	7	FW	(Italy)	Simone Zaza	5	0	2	1	8
6	6	MF	(Germany)	Sami Khedira	5	0	0	0	5
6	16	FW	(Colombia)	Juan Cuadrado	4	0	0	1	5
8	19	DF	(Italy)	Leonardo Bonucci	3	0	0	0	3
9	12	DF	(Brazil)	Alex Sandro	2	0	0	0	2
9	18	MF	(Gabon)	Mario Lemina	2	0	0	0	2
9	26	DF	(Switzerland)	Stephan Lichtsteiner	0	0	1	1	2
9	27	MF	(Italy)	Stefano Sturaro	1	0	0	1	2
9	33	DF	(France)	Patrice Evra	2	0	0	0	2
14	3	DF	(Italy)	Giorgio Chiellini	1	0	0	0	1
14	11	MF	(Brazil)	Hernanes	1	0	0	0	1
14	15	DF	(Italy)	Andrea Barzagli	1	0	0	0	1
14	20	MF	(Italy)	Simone Padoin	1	0	0	0	1
Own goal					3	0	0	0	3
Totals					75	2	9	10	96

Last updated: 21 May 2016

=== Disciplinary record ===
No.	Pos	Nat	Name	Serie A			Supercoppa			Coppa Italia			UEFA CL			Total		
No.	Pos	Nat	Name	Yellow card	(yellow card) (yellow-red card)	Red card	Yellow card	(yellow card) (yellow-red card)	Red card	Yellow card	(yellow card) (yellow-red card)	Red card	Yellow card	(yellow card) (yellow-red card)	Red card	Yellow card	(yellow card) (yellow-red card)	Red card
1	GK	(Italy)	Gianluigi Buffon	1	0	0	0	0	0	0	0	0	0	0	0	1	0	0
25	GK	(Brazil)	Neto	0	0	0	0	0	0	0	0	0	0	0	0	0	0	0
34	GK	(Brazil)	Rubinho	0	0	1	0	0	0	0	0	0	0	0	0	0	0	1
3	DF	(Italy)	Giorgio Chiellini	4	1	0	0	0	0	2	0	0	1	0	0	7	1	0
4	DF	(Uruguay)	Martín Cáceres	0	0	0	0	0	0	0	0	0	0	0	0	0	0	0
12	DF	(Brazil)	Alex Sandro	5	1	0	0	0	0	0	0	0	1	0	0	6	1	0
15	DF	(Italy)	Andrea Barzagli	2	0	0	0	0	0	1	0	0	0	0	0	3	0	0
19	DF	(Italy)	Leonardo Bonucci	6	0	0	0	0	0	2	0	0	1	0	0	9	0	0
24	DF	(Italy)	Daniele Rugani	2	0	0	0	0	0	1	0	0	0	0	0	3	0	0
26	DF	(Switzerland)	Stephan Lichtsteiner	5	0	0	0	0	0	0	0	0	1	0	0	6	0	0
33	DF	(France)	Patrice Evra	5	1	0	0	0	0	0	0	0	0	0	0	5	1	0
6	MF	(Germany)	Sami Khedira	3	0	1	0	0	0	0	0	0	1	0	0	4	0	1
8	MF	(Italy)	Claudio Marchisio	8	0	0	0	0	0	1	0	0	1	0	0	10	0	0
10	MF	(France)	Paul Pogba	10	0	0	0	0	0	2	0	0	0	0	0	12	0	0
11	MF	(Brazil)	Hernanes	6	0	0	0	0	0	0	0	0	0	0	1	6	0	1
18	MF	(Gabon)	Mario Lemina	4	0	0	0	0	0	1	0	0	0	0	0	5	0	0
20	MF	(Italy)	Simone Padoin	2	0	0	0	0	0	0	0	0	0	0	0	2	0	0
22	MF	(Ghana)	Kwadwo Asamoah	1	0	0	0	0	0	0	0	0	0	0	0	1	0	0
27	MF	(Italy)	Stefano Sturaro	6	0	0	0	0	0	1	0	0	3	0	0	10	0	0
37	MF	(Argentina)	Roberto Pereyra	0	0	0	0	0	0	0	0	0	1	0	0	1	0	0
7	FW	(Italy)	Simone Zaza	6	0	1	0	0	0	3	0	0	0	0	0	9	0	1
9	FW	(Spain)	Álvaro Morata	6	0	0	0	0	0	1	0	0	2	0	0	9	0	0
16	FW	(Colombia)	Juan Cuadrado	2	0	0	0	0	0	1	0	0	1	0	0	4	0	0
17	FW	(Croatia)	Mario Mandžukić	5	0	0	0	0	0	0	0	0	0	0	0	5	0	0
21	FW	(Argentina)	Paulo Dybala	1	0	0	0	0	0	1	0	0	1	0	0	3	0	0
Totals				90	3	3	0	0	0	17	0	0	14	0	1	121	3	4

Last updated: 21 May 2016

== Notes ==
A. The match was called after 70 minutes due to the annual tradition of pitch invasion.
