= 2018–19 Juventus FC season =

Italian football club season

Juventus
2018–19 season
- Chairman: Andrea Agnelli
- Manager: Massimiliano Allegri
- Stadium: Juventus Stadium
- Serie A: 1st
- Coppa Italia: Quarter-finals
- Supercoppa Italiana: Winners
- UEFA Champions League: Quarter-finals
- Top goalscorer: League: Cristiano Ronaldo (21); All: Cristiano Ronaldo (28)
- Highest home attendance: 41,495 vs Internazionale (7 December 2018, Serie A)
- Lowest home attendance: 30,239 vs Chievo (21 January 2019, Serie A)
- Average home league attendance: 39,244
| Home colours | Away colours | Third colours |

The 2018–19 season was Juventus Football Club's 121st in existence and 12th consecutive season in the top-flight of Italian football.

On 10 July 2018, Cristiano Ronaldo became the highest ever transfer for an Italian club with his €100 million transfer from Real Madrid.

The season was the first since 2000–01 without Gianluigi Buffon, who joined Paris Saint-Germain (although he returned for the following season for a second and final spell).

== Players ==
=== Squad information ===
Players and squad numbers last updated on 2 February 2019. Appearances include league matches only.
Note: Flags indicate national team as has been defined under FIFA eligibility rules. Players may hold more than one non-FIFA nationality.

| No. | Name | Nat | Position(s) | Date of birth (age) | Signed in | Contract ends | Signed from | Transfer Fee | Apps. | Goals |
Goalkeepers
| 1 | Wojciech Szczęsny | (Poland) | GK | 18 April 1990 (aged 29) | 2017 | 2021 | (England) Arsenal | €12M | 33 | 0 |
| 21 | Carlo Pinsoglio | (Italy) | GK | 16 March 1990 (aged 29) | 2014 | 2020 | (Italy) Youth Sector | N/A | 1 | 0 |
| 22 | Mattia Perin | (Italy) | GK | 10 November 1992 (aged 26) | 2018 | 2022 | (Italy) Genoa | €15M | 6 | 0 |
Defenders
| 2 | Mattia De Sciglio | (Italy) | RB / RWB / LB / LWB | 20 October 1992 (aged 26) | 2017 | 2022 | (Italy) AC Milan | €12M | 23 | 1 |
| 3 | Giorgio Chiellini (C) | (Italy) | CB | 14 August 1984 (aged 34) | 2005 | 2020 | (Italy) Fiorentina | €7.4M | 374 | 26 |
| 4 | Martín Cáceres | (Uruguay) | CB / RB / LB | 7 April 1987 (aged 32) | 2019 | 2019 | (Italy) Lazio | €0.6M | 78 | 4 |
| 12 | Alex Sandro | (Brazil) | LB / LWB | 26 January 1991 (aged 28) | 2015 | 2023 | (Portugal) Porto | €26M | 94 | 9 |
| 15 | Andrea Barzagli | (Italy) | CB | 8 May 1981 (aged 38) | 2011 | 2019 | (Germany) Wolfsburg | €0.3M | 203 | 2 |
| 19 | Leonardo Bonucci | (Italy) | CB | 1 May 1987 (aged 32) | 2018 | 2023 | (Italy) AC Milan | €35M | 244 | 14 |
| 20 | João Cancelo | (Portugal) | RB / RWB | 27 May 1994 (aged 25) | 2018 | 2023 | (Spain) Valencia | €40.4M | 14 | 1 |
| 24 | Daniele Rugani | (Italy) | CB | 29 July 1994 (aged 24) | 2015 | 2023 | (Italy) Empoli | €3.5M | 61 | 6 |
| 37 | Leonardo Spinazzola | (Italy) | LB / LWB / RB / RWB | 25 March 1993 (aged 26) | 2012 | 2022 | (Italy) Robur Siena | €0.4M | 2 | 0 |
| 43 | Paolo Gozzi | (Italy) | CB | 25 April 2001 (aged 18) | 2019 | 2020 | (Italy) Youth Sector | N/A | - | - |
Midfielders
| 5 | Miralem Pjanić | (Bosnia and Herzegovina) | DM / CM | 2 April 1990 (aged 29) | 2016 | 2023 | (Italy) Roma | €32M | 79 | 11 |
| 6 | Sami Khedira | (Germany) | DM / CM | 4 April 1987 (aged 32) | 2015 | 2021 | (Spain) Real Madrid | Free | 84 | 20 |
| 14 | Blaise Matuidi | (France) | CM / DM / LM | 9 April 1987 (aged 32) | 2017 | 2020 | (France) Paris Saint-Germain | €20M | 52 | 5 |
| 23 | Emre Can | (Germany) | DM / CM | 12 January 1994 (aged 25) | 2018 | 2022 | (England) Liverpool | Free^{a} | 16 | 1 |
| 30 | Rodrigo Bentancur | (Uruguay) | DM / CM | 25 June 1997 (aged 22) | 2017 | 2022 | (Argentina) Boca Juniors | €9.5M | 38 | 2 |
| 34 | Manolo Portanova | (Italy) | CM | 2 June 2000 (aged 19) | 2019 | 2020 | (Italy) Youth Sector | N/A | - | - |
| 35 | Matheus Pereira da Silva | (Brazil) | RW / AM | 25 February 1998 (aged 21) | 2017 | 2022 | (Italy) Empoli | €2M | - | - |
| 39 | Grigoris Kastanos | (Cyprus) | RW / CM / AM | 30 January 1998 (aged 21) | 2016 | 2022 | (Italy) Youth Sector | N/A | - | - |
| 41 | Hans Nicolussi Caviglia | (Italy) | LW / AM | 18 June 2000 (aged 19) | 2019 | - | (Italy) Youth Sector | N/A | - | - |
Forwards
| 7 | Cristiano Ronaldo | (Portugal) | LW / ST | 5 February 1985 (aged 34) | 2018 | 2022 | (Spain) Real Madrid | €100M^{b} | 22 | 17 |
| 10 | Paulo Dybala | (Argentina) | RW / AM / SS | 15 November 1993 (aged 25) | 2015 | 2022 | (Italy) Palermo | €32M | 117 | 54 |
| 11 | Douglas Costa | (Brazil) | LW / RW | 14 September 1990 (aged 28) | 2017 | 2022 | (Germany) Bayern Munich | €40M | 48 | 5 |
| 16 | Juan Cuadrado | (Colombia) | RW / RWB | 26 May 1988 (aged 31) | 2016 | 2020 | (England) Chelsea | €25M | 90 | 11 |
| 17 | Mario Mandžukić | (Croatia) | ST / LW | 21 May 1986 (aged 33) | 2015 | 2020 | (Spain) Atlético Madrid | €19M | 110 | 30 |
| 18 | Moise Kean | (Italy) | ST | 28 February 2000 (aged 19) | 2016 | 2020 | (Italy) Youth Sector | N/A | 5 | 1 |
| 33 | Federico Bernardeschi | (Italy) | RW / LW / AM | 16 February 1994 (aged 25) | 2017 | 2022 | (Italy) Fiorentina | €40M | 36 | 6 |
| 40 | Stephy Mavididi | (England) | ST | 31 May 1998 (aged 21) | 2019 | 2022 | (England) Arsenal | €2M | - | - |

a. Additional costs of €16 million to be paid over the next two financial years.
b. Additional costs of €12 million to be paid.

== Transfers ==
=== Summer 2018 ===
==== In ====
| Date | Pos. | Player | Age | Moving from | Fee | Notes | Source |
|---|---|---|---|---|---|---|---|
| 1 July 2018 | DF | (Italy) Mattia Caldara | 24 | (Italy) Atalanta | N/A | End of loan | |
| 1 July 2018 | DF | (Italy) Leonardo Spinazzola | 25 | (Italy) Atalanta | N/A | End of loan | |
| 1 July 2018 | FW | (Italy) Moise Kean | 18 | (Italy) Hellas Verona | N/A | End of loan | |
| 1 July 2018 | GK | (Italy) Mattia Perin | 25 | (Italy) Genoa | €12M + €3M variables | €12M paid in three instalments | |
| 1 July 2018 | MF | (Germany) Emre Can | 24 | (England) Liverpool | Free | Additional costs of €16M paid in two instalments | |
| 1 July 2018 | DF | (Portugal) João Cancelo | 24 | (Spain) Valencia | €40.4M | Paid in three instalments | |
| 10 July 2018 | FW | (Portugal) Cristiano Ronaldo | 33 | (Spain) Real Madrid | €100M | Paid in two instalments, plus additional costs of €12M. | |
| 2 August 2018 | DF | (Italy) Leonardo Bonucci | 31 | (Italy) AC Milan | €35M | Paid in two instalments | |

==== Out ====
| Date | Pos. | Player | Age | Moving to | Fee | Notes | Source |
|---|---|---|---|---|---|---|---|
| 1 July 2018 | DF | (Germany) Benedikt Höwedes | 30 | (Germany) Schalke 04 | Free | End of loan | |
| 1 July 2018 | DF | (Switzerland) Stephan Lichtsteiner | 34 | (England) Arsenal | Free | Contract expiration | |
| 1 July 2018 | MF | (Ghana) Kwadwo Asamoah | 29 | (Italy) Internazionale | Free | Contract expiration | |
| 6 July 2018 | GK | (Italy) Gianluigi Buffon | 40 | (France) Paris Saint-Germain | Free | Contract expiration | |
| 2 August 2018 | DF | (Italy) Mattia Caldara | 24 | (Italy) AC Milan | €35M | Paid in two instalments | |
| 2 August 2018 | FW | (Argentina) Gonzalo Higuaín | 30 | (Italy) AC Milan | €18M | On loan at Chelsea until end of season with an option to buy for €36M | |
| 11 August 2018 | MF | (Italy) Stefano Sturaro | 25 | (Portugal) Sporting CP | N/A | On loan until June 2019 | |
| 16 August 2018 | MF | (Italy) Claudio Marchisio | 32 | (Russia) Zenit Saint Petersburg | Free | Released | |

==== Other acquisitions ====
| Date | Pos. | Player | Age | Moving from | Fee | Notes | Source |
|---|---|---|---|---|---|---|---|
| 7 June 2018 | FW | (Brazil) Douglas Costa | 27 | (Germany) Bayern Munich | €40M+€1M variables | Bought out loan from Bayern Munich €40M paid in two instalments | |
| 1 July 2018 | FW | (Italy) Andrea Favilli | 21 | (Italy) Ascoli | €7.5M+1.25M variables | €7.5M paid in two instalments | |
| 1 July 2018 | GK | (Italy) Timothy Nocchi | 27 | (Italy) Perugia | N/A | End of loan to play for Juventus Under 23 | |
| 1 July 2018 | GK | (Brazil) Matheus Pereira da Silva | 20 | (Brazil) Paraná | N/A | End of loan to play for Juventus Under 23 | |
| 2 July 2018 | DF | (Italy) Giangiacomo Magnani | 22 | (Italy) Perugia | €5M | Paid in three instalments | |
| 10 August 2018 | DF | (Italy) Simone Emmanuello | 24 | (Italy) Atalanta | €0.85M | To play for Juventus Under 23 | |
| 14 August 2018 | DF | (Italy) Raffaele Alcibiade | 28 | (Italy) Pro Vercelli | Undisclosed | To play for Juventus Under 23 | |
| 17 August 2018 | DF | (Italy) Gabriele Morelli | 21 | (Italy) Livorno | N/A | On loan to play for Juventus Under 23 | |
| 17 August 2018 | FW | (England) Stephy Mavididi | 20 | (England) Arsenal | €1.5M | To play for Juventus Under 23 | |
| 8 October 2018 | DF | (Italy) Lorenzo Del Prete | 32 | Unattached | Free | To play for Juventus Under 23 | |

==== Other disposals ====
| Date | Pos. | Player | Age | Moving to | Fee | Notes | Source |
|---|---|---|---|---|---|---|---|
| 30 June 2018 | GK | (Italy) Nicola Leali | 25 | (Italy) Perugia | €2.5M | Opted for option to sign permanently | |
| 30 June 2018 | DF | (Switzerland) Joel Untersee | 24 | (Italy) Empoli | €0.5M | Opted for option to sign permanently | |
| 1 July 2018 | GK | (Italy) Alberto Gallinetta | 26 | - | Free | Contract expiration | |
| 5 July 2018 | FW | (Guinea) Alhassane Soumah | 22 | (Austria) WSG Wattens | N/A | On loan until June 2019 | |
| 11 July 2018 | DF | (Spain) Pol García | 23 | (Belgium) VV Sint-Truiden | Free | | |
| 12 July 2018 | FW | (Italy) Alberto Cerri | 22 | (Italy) Cagliari | €1M | On loan until 2019 with obligation to buy for €9M | |
| 13 July 2018 | MF | (Colombia) Andrés Tello | 21 | (Italy) Benevento | €2.5M | Option for Buy-back clause | |
| 14 July 2018 | DF | (Italy) Stefano Pellizzari | 21 | (Italy) Ravenna | N/A | On loan until June 2019 | |
| 14 July 2018 | MF | (Italy) Giorgio Siani | 21 | (Italy) Ravenna | N/A | On loan until June 2019 | |
| 17 July 2018 | GK | (Italy) Emil Audero | 21 | (Italy) Sampdoria | €1M | On loan until 2019 with option to buy for €14M and Buy-back clause for Juventus | |
| 20 July 2018 | FW | (Italy) Davide Cais | 24 | (Italy) Albissola | N/A | On loan until June 2019 | |
| 25 July 2018 | GK | (Italy) Alberto Brignoli | 26 | (Italy) Palermo | €1M | | |
| 26 July 2018 | MF | (Italy) Rolando Mandragora | 21 | (Italy) Udinese | €20M | Paid in four instalments and €26M; Buy-back clause for Juventus until 2019–20 season | |
| 27 July 2018 | DF | (Italy) Giangiacomo Magnani | 22 | (Italy) Sassuolo | €5M | Paid in three instalments and €12M; Buy-back clause for Juventus until 2019–20 season | |
| 28 July 2018 | DF | (Italy) Dario Del Fabro | 23 | (Italy) Cremonese | N/A | On loan until June 2019 | |
| 30 July 2018 | DF | (Italy) Luca Barlocco | 23 | (Italy) Piacenza | N/A | On loan until June 2019 | |
| 5 August 2018 | MF | (Italy) Luca Marrone | 28 | (Italy) Verona | N/A | On loan until June 2019 with obligation to buy | |
| 7 August 2018 | FW | (Croatia) Marko Pjaca | 23 | (Italy) Fiorentina | €2M | On loan until 2019 with an option to buy for €20M and Buy-back clause for Juventus | |
| 10 August 2018 | FW | (Italy) Andrea Favilli | 21 | (Italy) Genoa | €5M | On loan until June 2019 with option to buy of €7M with buy back clause | |
| 10 August 2018 | FW | (Italy) Eric Lanini | 24 | (Italy) Imolese | N/A | On loan until June 2019 | |
| 11 August 2018 | DF | (Italy) Nazzareno Belfasti | 23 | (Italy) Reggio Audace | Free | Contract expiration | |
| 12 August 2018 | FW | (Italy) Stefano Beltrame | 25 | (Netherlands) Den Bosch | N/A | On loan until June 2019 | |
| 13 August 2018 | MF | (France) Roger Tamba M'Pinda | 19 | (Croatia) NK Osijek | N/A | On loan until June 2019 with option to buy | |
| 13 August 2018 | MF | (Guinea) Oumar Toure | 19 | (Albania) FK Kukësi | N/A | On loan until June 2019 | |
| 14 August 2018 | GK | (Romania) Laurentiu Branescu | 24 | (Slovenia) HNK Gorica | N/A | On loan until June 2019 | |
| 17 August 2018 | MF | (Italy) Luca Clemenza | 21 | (Italy) Padova | N/A | On loan until June 2019 | |
| 17 August 2018 | MF | (Italy) Ferdinando Del Sole | 20 | (Italy) Pescara | N/A | On loan until June 2019 | |
| 24 August 2018 | MF | (Italy) Nicola Mosti | 20 | (Italy) Imolese | N/A | On loan until June 2019 | |
| 31 August 2018 | MF | (Czech Republic) Roman Macek | 21 | (Switzerland) Lugano | N/A | On loan until June 2019 | |
| 14 September 2018 | FW | (Italy) King Udoh | 21 | (Italy) Viareggio | Free | Released | |

Total expenditure: €242,750,000

Total revenue: €93,500,000

Net income: ▼€149,250,000

=== Winter 2018–19 ===
==== In ====
| Date | Pos. | Player | Age | Moving from | Fee | Notes | Source |
|---|---|---|---|---|---|---|---|
| 29 January 2019 | DF | (Uruguay) Martín Cáceres | 31 | (Italy) Lazio | €0.6M | On loan until June 2019 | |

==== Out ====
| Date | Pos. | Player | Age | Moving to | Fee | Notes | Source |
|---|---|---|---|---|---|---|---|
| 28 January 2019 | DF | (Morocco) Medhi Benatia | 31 | (Qatar) Al-Duhail | €8M | €2M variables | |

==== Other acquisitions ====
| Date | Pos. | Player | Age | Moving to | Fee | Notes | Source |
|---|---|---|---|---|---|---|---|
| 31 January 2019 | FW | (Democratic Republic of the Congo) Benjamin Mokulu | 29 | (Italy) Carpi | N/A | On loan until end of season with obligation to buy at the end of the season to play for Juventus Under 23 | |
| 30 January 2019 | MF | (Belgium) Daouda Peeters | 20 | (Italy) Sampdoria | €4M | On loan to Sampdoria until June 2019 | |
| 31 January 2019 | FW | (Italy) Erik Gerbi | 18 | (Italy) Pro Vercelli | €1.45M | On loan to Pro Vercelli until June 2019 | |

==== Other disposals ====
| Date | Pos. | Player | Age | Moving to | Fee | Notes | Source |
|---|---|---|---|---|---|---|---|
| 23 January 2019 | FW | (Argentina) Gonzalo Higuaín | 31 | (England) Chelsea | N/A | On loan until end of season with an option to buy for €36M or renewal of season loan for €18M | |
| 26 January 2019 | MF | (Czech Republic) Roman Macek | 21 | (Switzerland) Lugano | €1M | Redeem after loan | |
| 31 January 2019 | DF | (Italy) Simone Emmanuello | 24 | (Italy) Pro Vercelli | €0.95M | | |
| 31 January 2019 | FW | (Italy) Andrea Favilli | 21 | (Italy) Genoa | N/A | Renowal of loan until June 2020 with obligation to buy for €7M at end of the season | |
| 31 January 2019 | MF | (Guinea) Oumar Toure | 20 | (Greece) Sparti | N/A | On loan until June 2019 | |
| 6 February 2019 | MF | (Italy) Stefano Sturaro | 25 | (Italy) Genoa | €18M | On 24 January 2019, a loan deal was initially done for €1.5M until end of season with an option to buy for €8.5M + €8M variables, however, later made a permanent deal for €16.5M on 6 February 2019. | |
| 12 February 2019 | GK | (Romania) Laurentiu Branescu | 24 | (Lithuania) Zalgiris Vilnius | N/A | On loan until June 2019 | |
| 19 February 2019 | FW | (Italy) Alberto Cerri | 22 | (Italy) Cagliari | €9M | Opted to sign permanently | |
| 26 February 2019 | GK | (Italy) Emil Audero | 22 | (Italy) Sampdoria | €20M | On 29 January 2019, a renewal of loan was initially done with obligation to buy for €20M at end of the season and optional future buy-back clause for Juventus, however, later made a permanent deal for €20M on 26 February 2019 opted to sign permanently with optional future buy-back clause for Juventus | |

Total expenditure: €6,050,000

Total revenue: €56,950,000

Net income: ▲€50,900,000

=== End of the season ===
==== Other acquisitions ====
| Date | Pos. | Player | Age | Moving to | Fee | Notes | Source |
|---|---|---|---|---|---|---|---|
| 30 June 2019 | DF | (Italy) Edoardo Masciangelo | 22 | (Switzerland) Lugano | €1M | Redeem after loan to play for Juventus Under 23 | |
| 30 June 2019 | FW | (Democratic Republic of the Congo) Benjamin Mokulu | 29 | (Italy) Carpi | €0.45M | Redeem after loan to play for Juventus Under 23 | |
| 30 June 2019 | FW | (Italy) Luca Zanimacchia | 20 | (Italy) Genoa | €4M | Redeem after loan to play for Juventus Under 23 | |
| 30 June 2019 | FW | (Italy) Marco Olivieri | 20 | (Italy) Empoli | €1M + €0.2M | €0.2M for season loan and €1M for option to buy. Redeem after loan to play for Juventus Under 23 | |
| 30 June 2019 | MF | (Germany) Idrissa Touré | 21 | (Germany) Werder Bremen | €1.3M | Redeem after loan to play for Juventus Under 23 | |

==== Other disposals ====
| Date | Pos. | Player | Age | Moving to | Fee | Notes | Source |
|---|---|---|---|---|---|---|---|
| 3 June 2019 | MF | (Italy) Luca Marrone | 29 | (Italy) Hellas Verona | €0.45M | Opted to sign permanently | |
| 20 June 2019 | FW | (Italy) Riccardo Orsolini | 22 | (Italy) Bologna | €15M | Opted to sign permanently and €22.5M Buy-back clause for Juventus | |

Total expenditure: €216.000,000 (considered disposals only from July 2019)

Total revenue: €163.450,000 (considered disposals only from July 2019)

Net income: ▼€52,550,000 (considered disposals only from July 2019)

== Pre-season and friendlies ==
| 14 July 2018 Friendly | Juventus | 4–0 | Chisola Calcio A.S.D. | Continassa, Turin |
| CEST (UTC+02:00) | Can; Kastanos; Alex Sandro; Clemenza | Report | | Stadium: Juventus Training Center |

| 25 July 2018 ICC 1 | Juventus | 2–0 | Bayern Munich | Philadelphia, United States |
| 19:05 EDT (UTC−4) | Chiellini (yellow card) 16'; Favilli 32', 40' | Report | | Stadium: Lincoln Financial Field; Attendance: 32,105; Referee: Chris Penso (United States) |

| 28 July 2018 ICC 2 | Benfica | 1–1 (2–4 p) | Juventus | Harrison, New Jersey, United States |
| 19:05 EDT (UTC−4) | Grimaldo 65'; Parks (yellow card) 82' | Report | Clemenza 84' | Stadium: Red Bull Arena; Attendance: 24,194; Referee: José Carlos Rivero (United States) |
| | Penalties |
| | Parks (penalty scored); Jonas (penalty missed); Samaris (penalty scored); Félix (penalty missed) | | (penalty scored) Fagioli; (penalty scored) Can; (penalty scored) Beltrame; (penalty scored) Alex Sandro |

| 1 August 2018 MLS All-Star Game | MLS All-Stars | 1–1 (3–5 p) | Juventus | Atlanta, United States |
| 19:30 EDT (UTC−4) | Martínez 26' | Report | Favilli 21'; Alex Sandro (yellow card) 44'; Fernandes (yellow card) 88' | Stadium: Mercedes-Benz Stadium; Attendance: 72,317; Referee: Robert Sibiga (United States) |
| | Penalties |
| | Zusi (penalty scored); Yotún (penalty scored); Valeri (penalty scored); Wright-Phillips (penalty missed) | | (penalty scored) Fagioli; (penalty scored) Beltrame; (penalty scored) Kastanos; (penalty scored) Fernandes; (penalty scored) De Sciglio |

| 4 August 2018 ICC 3 | Real Madrid | 3–1 | Juventus | Landover, Maryland, United States |
| 18:05 EDT (UTC−4) | Bale 39'; Asensio 47', 56'; Reguilón (yellow card) 81' | Report | Benatia (yellow card) 6'; Carvajal 12' (o.g.); Alex Sandro (yellow card) 33' | Stadium: FedExField; Attendance: 71,597; Referee: Robert Sibiga (United States) |

| 12 August 2018 Villar Perosa | Juventus | 5–0^{[A]} | Juventus B | Villar Perosa |
| 17:00 CEST (UTC+2) | Ronaldo 8'; Capellini 18' (o.g.); Dybala 31', 40'; Marchisio 53' | Report | | Attendance: 4,800; Referee: Gianluca Manganiello (Italy) |

== Competitions ==
=== Overall ===
| Competition | First match | Last match | Starting round | Final position | Record | | | | | | | |
| Competition | First match | Last match | Starting round | Final position | Pld | W | D | L | GF | GA | GD | Win % |
|---|---|---|---|---|---|---|---|---|---|---|---|---|
| Serie A | 18 August 2018 | 26 May 2019 | Matchday 1 | Winners | 38 | 28 | 6 | 4 | 70 | 30 | +40 | 73.68 |
| Coppa Italia | 12 January 2019 | 30 January 2019 | Round of 16 | Quarter-finals | 2 | 1 | 0 | 1 | 2 | 3 | −1 | 50.00 |
| Supercoppa Italiana | 16 January 2019 | 16 January 2019 | Final | Winners | 1 | 1 | 0 | 0 | 1 | 0 | +1 | 100.00 |
| Champions League | 19 September 2018 | 16 April 2019 | Group stage | Quarter-finals | 10 | 5 | 1 | 4 | 14 | 9 | +5 | 50.00 |
| Total | | | | | 51 | 35 | 7 | 9 | 87 | 42 | +45 | 68.63 |

Last updated: 26 May 2019
Source: Competitions

=== Supercoppa Italiana ===
| 16 January 2019 | Juventus | 1–0 | AC Milan | Jeddah, Saudi Arabia |
| 20:30 AST | Alex Sandro (yellow card) 26'; Pjanić (yellow card) 44'; Ronaldo 61'; Dybala (yellow card) 90+4' | Report | Çalhanoğlu (yellow card) 21'; Castillejo (yellow card) 45+2'; Kessié (red card) 74'; Romagnoli (yellow card) 74'; Calabria (yellow card) 82'; Rodríguez (yellow card) 87' | Stadium: King Abdullah Sports City; Attendance: 61,235; Referee: Luca Banti |

=== Serie A ===
==== League table ====
| Pos | Team | Pld | W | D | L | GF | GA | GD | Pts | Qualification or relegation |
|---|---|---|---|---|---|---|---|---|---|---|
| 1 | Juventus (C) | 38 | 28 | 6 | 4 | 70 | 30 | +40 | 90 | Qualification for the Champions League group stage |
| 2 | Napoli | 38 | 24 | 7 | 7 | 74 | 36 | +38 | 79 | Qualification for the Champions League group stage |
| 3 | Atalanta | 38 | 20 | 9 | 9 | 77 | 46 | +31 | 69 (Note: Atalanta finished ahead of Internazionale on head-to-head points: Atalanta 4–1 Internazionale, Internazionale 0–0 Atalanta.) | Qualification for the Champions League group stage |
| 4 | Inter Milan | 38 | 20 | 9 | 9 | 57 | 33 | +24 | 69 | Qualification for the Champions League group stage |
| 5 | Milan (Note: Milan were excluded from UEFA competitions over financial fair play violation.) | 38 | 19 | 11 | 8 | 55 | 36 | +19 | 68 | |

Source: Serie A, Soccerway
Rules for classification: 1) Points; 2) Head-to-head points; 3) Head-to-head goal difference; 4) Goal difference; 5) Goals scored; 6) Draw. (Note: Head-to-head record is used only after all the matches between the teams in question have been played).
(C) Champions

==== Results summary ====
| Overall | | | | | | | | Home | | | | | | Away | | | | | |
| Pld | W | D | L | GF | GA | GD | Pts | W | D | L | GF | GA | GD | W | D | L | GF | GA | GD |
|---|---|---|---|---|---|---|---|---|---|---|---|---|---|---|---|---|---|---|---|
| 38 | 28 | 6 | 4 | 70 | 30 | +40 | 90 | 15 | 4 | 0 | 39 | 13 | +26 | 13 | 2 | 4 | 31 | 17 | +14 |

Last updated: 26 May 2019.
Source: Competitive matches

==== Results by round ====
| Round | 1 | 2 | 3 | 4 | 5 | 6 | 7 | 8 | 9 | 10 | 11 | 12 | 13 | 14 | 15 | 16 | 17 | 18 | 19 | 20 | 21 | 22 | 23 | 24 | 25 | 26 | 27 | 28 | 29 | 30 | 31 | 32 | 33 | 34 | 35 | 36 | 37 | 38 |
|---|---|---|---|---|---|---|---|---|---|---|---|---|---|---|---|---|---|---|---|---|---|---|---|---|---|---|---|---|---|---|---|---|---|---|---|---|---|---|
| Ground | A | H | A | H | A | H | H | A | H | A | H | A | H | A | H | A | H | A | H | H | A | H | A | H | A | A | H | A | H | A | H | A | H | A | H | A | H | A |
| Result | W | W | W | W | W | W | W | W | D | W | W | W | W | W | W | W | W | D | W | W | W | D | W | W | W | W | W | L | W | W | W | L | W | D | D | L | D | L |
| Position | 3 | 1 | 1 | 1 | 1 | 1 | 1 | 1 | 1 | 1 | 1 | 1 | 1 | 1 | 1 | 1 | 1 | 1 | 1 | 1 | 1 | 1 | 1 | 1 | 1 | 1 | 1 | 1 | 1 | 1 | 1 | 1 | 1 | 1 | 1 | 1 | 1 | 1 |

Updated to match(es) played on 26 May 2019. Source: Competitive matches
A = Away; H = Home; W = Win; D = Draw; L = Loss

==== Matches ====
| 18 August 2018 1 | Chievo | 2–3 | Juventus | Verona |
| 18:00 CEST (UTC+02:00) | Stępiński 38'; Giaccherini 56' (pen.); Radovanović (yellow card) 60'; Tomović (yellow card) 90+5' | Report | Khedira 3'; Bani 75' (o.g.); Bernardeschi 90+3' | Stadium: Stadio Marc'Antonio Bentegodi; Attendance: 28,375; Referee: Fabrizio Pasqua |

| 25 August 2018 2 | Juventus | 2–0 | Lazio | Turin |
| 18:00 CEST (UTC+02:00) | Pjanić 30'; Alex Sandro (yellow card) 45+1'; Mandžukić 75'; Douglas Costa (yellow card) 81'; Can (yellow card) 87' | Report | Parolo (yellow card) 52'; Milinković-Savić (yellow card) 66' | Stadium: Allianz Stadium; Attendance: 40,173; Referee: Massimiliano Irrati |

| 1 September 2018 3 | Parma | 1–2 | Juventus | Parma |
| 20:30 CEST (UTC+02:00) | Gervinho 33'; Rigoni (yellow card) 45+2' | Report | Mandžukić 2'; Pjanić (yellow card) 13'; Bernardeschi (yellow card) 40'; Matuidi 58'; Cuadrado (yellow card) 90' | Stadium: Stadio Ennio Tardini; Attendance: 20,814; Referee: Daniele Doveri |

| 16 September 2018 4 | Juventus | 2–1 | Sassuolo | Turin |
| 15:00 CEST (UTC+02:00) | Cancelo (yellow card) 32'; Ronaldo 50', 65'; Alex Sandro (yellow card) 60'; Douglas Costa (yellow card) 90+1' (red card) 90+4' | Report | Đuričić (yellow card) 23'; Berardi (yellow card) 26'; Bourabia (yellow card) 40'; Babacar 90+1' | Stadium: Allianz Stadium; Attendance: 40,563; Referee: Daniele Chiffi |

| 23 September 2018 5 | Frosinone | 0–2 | Juventus | Frosinone |
| 20:30 CEST (UTC+02:00) | Perica (yellow card) 29'; Molinaro (yellow card) 62'; Sportiello (yellow card) 80' | Report | Bentancur (yellow card) 28'; Ronaldo 81'; Bernardeschi 90+4' | Stadium: Stadio Benito Stirpe; Attendance: 16,310; Referee: Piero Giacomelli |

| 26 September 2018 6 | Juventus | 2–0 | Bologna | Turin |
| 20:30 CEST (UTC+02:00) | Dybala 12'; Matuidi 16'; Pjanić (yellow card) 33'; Cuadrado (yellow card) 74' | Report | Paz (yellow card) 37'; Danilo (yellow card) 67'; Calabresi (yellow card) 71' | Stadium: Allianz Stadium; Attendance: 38,472; Referee: Maurizio Mariani |

| 29 September 2018 7 | Juventus | 3–1 | Napoli | Turin |
| 18:00 CEST (UTC+02:00) | Mandžukić 26', 49'; Bonucci (yellow card) 60', (goal) 76'; Cancelo (yellow card) 69'; Alex Sandro (yellow card) 85' | Report | Mertens 10'; Mário Rui (yellow card) 24' (yellow-red card) 58'; Koulibaly (yellow card) 40'; Hysaj (yellow card) 55'; Insigne (yellow card) 60' | Stadium: Allianz Stadium; Attendance: 39,252; Referee: Luca Banti |

| 6 October 2018 8 | Udinese | 0–2 | Juventus | Udine |
| 18:00 CEST (UTC+02:00) | De Paul (yellow card) 50'; Santos (yellow card) 80'; Lasagna (yellow card) 82' | Report | Bentancur 33'; Ronaldo 37'; Mandžukić (yellow card) 90+4' | Stadium: Dacia Arena; Attendance: 25,021; Referee: Rosario Abisso |

| 20 October 2018 9 | Juventus | 1–1 | Genoa | Turin |
| 18:00 CEST (UTC+02:00) | Ronaldo 18'; Benatia (yellow card) 30' | Report | Romero (yellow card) 9'; Bessa 67'; Criscito (yellow card) 71'; Pandev (yellow card) 90' | Stadium: Allianz Stadium; Attendance: 37,735; Referee: Federico La Penna |

| 27 October 2018 10 | Empoli | 1–2 | Juventus | Empoli |
| 18:00 CEST (UTC+02:00) | Caputo 28'; Traorè (yellow card) 58'; Uçan (yellow card) 90+1' | Report | Bernardeschi (yellow card) 43'; Bentancur (yellow card) 45+3'; Ronaldo 54' (pen.), 70'; Dybala (yellow card) 78' | Stadium: Stadio Carlo Castellani; Attendance: 15,889; Referee: Gianpaolo Calvarese |

| 3 November 2018 11 | Juventus | 3–1 | Cagliari | Turin |
| 20:30 CET (UTC+01:00) | Dybala 1'; Bradarić 38' (o.g.); Matuidi (yellow card) 75'; Cuadrado 87' | Report | Bradarić (yellow card) 32'; João Pedro 36'; Pavoletti (yellow card) 49'; Pisacane (yellow card) 63' | Stadium: Allianz Stadium; Attendance: 40,644; Referee: Maurizio Mariani |

| 11 November 2018 12 | AC Milan | 0–2 | Juventus | Milan |
| 20:30 CET (UTC+01:00) | Bakayoko (yellow card) 61'; Higuaín (penalty missed) 32', (yellow card) 83', (red card) 83'; Borini (yellow card) 87' | Report | Mandžukić 8'; Benatia (yellow card) 34'; Ronaldo 81' | Stadium: San Siro; Attendance: 74,729; Referee: Paolo Mazzoleni |

| 24 November 2018 13 | Juventus | 2–0 | SPAL | Turin |
| 18:00 CET (UTC+01:00) | Ronaldo 29'; Mandžukić 60'; Bentancur (yellow card) 64' | Report | Cionek (yellow card) 39'; Fares (yellow card) 49'; Schiattarella (yellow card) 74' | Stadium: Allianz Stadium; Attendance: 41,052; Referee: Federico La Penna |

| 1 December 2018 14 | Fiorentina | 0–3 | Juventus | Florence |
| 18:00 CET (UTC+01:00) | Fernandes (yellow card) 44'; Hugo (yellow card) 51'; Milenković (yellow card) 64'; Pezzella (yellow card) 71'; Théréau (yellow card) 88'; Veretout (yellow card) 90+1' | Report | Mandžukić (yellow card) 11'; Bentancur 31', (yellow card) 50'; Chiellini 69'; Ronaldo 79' (pen.), (yellow card) 80' | Stadium: Stadio Artemio Franchi; Attendance: 40,872; Referee: Daniele Orsato |

| 7 December 2018 15 | Juventus | 1–0 | Internazionale | Turin |
| 20:30 CET (UTC+01:00) | Pjanić (yellow card) 6'; Bentancur (yellow card) 54'; Mandžukić 66' | Report | Perišić (yellow card) 55'; Brozović (yellow card) 57' | Stadium: Allianz Stadium; Attendance: 41,495; Referee: Massimiliano Irrati |

| 15 December 2018 16 | Torino | 0–1 | Juventus | Turin |
| 20:30 CET (UTC+01:00) | Zaza (yellow card) 27'; Ansaldi (yellow card) 72' | Report | Pjanić (yellow card) 48'; Can (yellow card) 51'; Ronaldo 70' (pen.), (yellow card) 70'; Perin (yellow card) 90+2' | Stadium: Stadio Olimpico Grande Torino; Attendance: 26,550; Referee: Marco Guida |

| 22 December 2018 17 | Juventus | 1–0 | Roma | Turin |
| 20:30 CET (UTC+01:00) | Mandžukić 35' | Report | Nzonzi (yellow card) 40'; Schick (yellow card) 81'; Zaniolo (yellow card) 90+6' | Stadium: Allianz Stadium; Attendance: 40,069; Referee: Davide Massa |

| 26 December 2018 18 | Atalanta | 2–2 | Juventus | Bergamo |
| 15:00 CET (UTC+01:00) | Zapata 24', 56', (yellow card) 29'; Mancini (yellow card) 32'; Hateboer (yellow card) 60'; Freuler (yellow card) 90' | Report | Djimsiti 2' (o.g.); Bentancur (yellow card) 18' (yellow-red card) 53'; Chiellini (yellow card) 38'; Mandžukić (yellow card) 62'; Ronaldo 78' | Stadium: Stadio Atleti Azzurri d'Italia; Attendance: 19,787; Referee: Luca Banti |

| 29 December 2018 19 | Juventus | 2–1 | Sampdoria | Turin |
| 12:30 CET (UTC+01:00) | Ronaldo 2', 65' (pen.); Matuidi (yellow card) 36'; Rugani (yellow card) 71' | Report | Quagliarella 33' (pen.); Ferrari (yellow card) 37'; Saponara (yellow card) 90+3' | Stadium: Allianz Stadium; Attendance: 40,641; Referee: Paolo Valeri |

| 21 January 2019 20 | Juventus | 3–0 | Chievo | Turin |
| 19:00 CET (UTC+01:00) | Douglas Costa 13'; Can 45'; Ronaldo (penalty missed) 52'; De Sciglio (yellow card) 80'; Rugani 84' | Report | Bani (yellow card) 51'; Kiyine (yellow card) 83' | Stadium: Allianz Stadium; Attendance: 30,239; Referee: Marco Piccinini |

| 27 January 2019 21 | Lazio | 1–2 | Juventus | Rome |
| 20:30 CET (UTC+01:00) | Lucas (yellow card) 50'; Can 59' (o.g.); Milinković-Savić (yellow card) 80' | Report | Can (yellow card) 24'; Matuidi (yellow card) 49'; De Sciglio (yellow card) 70'; Rugani (yellow card) 73'; Cancelo 74'; Chiellini (yellow card) 80'; Ronaldo 88' (pen.) | Stadium: Stadio Olimpico; Attendance: 60,687; Referee: Marco Guida |

| 2 February 2019 22 | Juventus | 3–3 | Parma | Turin |
| 20:30 CET (UTC+01:00) | Ronaldo 36', 66'; Rugani 62'; Can (yellow card) 90+1' | Report | Barillà (yellow card) 26', (goal) 64'; Scozzarella (yellow card) 28'; Gervinho 74', 90+3' | Stadium: Allianz Stadium; Attendance: 39,548; Referee: Piero Giacomelli |

| 10 February 2019 23 | Sassuolo | 0–3 | Juventus | Reggio Emilia |
| 18:00 CET (UTC+01:00) | Magnani (yellow card) 30'; Bourabia (yellow card) 38'; Lirola (yellow card) 90+4' | Report | Pjanić (yellow card) 6'; Khedira 23'; Alex Sandro (yellow card) 27'; Ronaldo 70'; Can 86' | Stadium: Mapei Stadium – Città del Tricolore; Attendance: 21,584; Referee: Paolo Mazzoleni |

| 15 February 2019 24 | Juventus | 3–0 | Frosinone | Turin |
| 20:30 CET (UTC+01:00) | Dybala 6'; Bonucci 17'; Can (yellow card) 27'; Ronaldo 63'; Cancelo (yellow card) 89' | Report | Salamon (yellow card) 37'; Capuano (yellow card) 62'; Cassata (yellow card) 81' | Stadium: Allianz Stadium; Attendance: 37,294; Referee: Antonio Giua |

| 24 February 2019 25 | Bologna | 0–1 | Juventus | Bologna |
| 15:00 CET (UTC+01:00) | Pulgar (yellow card) 6'; Sansone (yellow card) 74' | Report | Bentancur (yellow card) 16'; Dybala 67'; Cancelo (yellow card) 90+2' | Stadium: Stadio Renato Dall'Ara; Attendance: 28,934; Referee: Gianpaolo Calvarese |

| 3 March 2019 26 | Napoli | 1–2 | Juventus | Naples |
| 20:30 CET (UTC+01:00) | Meret (red card) 25'; Callejón 61'; Maksimović (yellow card) 77'; Insigne (penalty missed) 86'; Koulibaly (yellow card) 86'; Allan (yellow card) 89' | Report | Pjanić 28', (yellow card) 34' (yellow-red card) 47'; Can 39'; Cancelo (yellow card) 54'; Alex Sandro (yellow card) 83'; Bentancur (yellow card) 89'; Dybala (yellow card) 90+2' | Stadium: Stadio San Paolo; Attendance: 42,667; Referee: Gianluca Rocchi |

| 8 March 2019 27 | Juventus | 4–1 | Udinese | Turin |
| 20:30 CET (UTC+01:00) | Kean 11', 39'; Can 67' (pen.); Matuidi 71' | Report | Stryger Larsen (yellow card) 27'; Pussetto (yellow card) 50'; Opoku (yellow card) 53'; Lasagna 85' | Stadium: Allianz Stadium; Attendance: 39,987; Referee: Daniele Chiffi |

| 17 March 2019 28 | Genoa | 2–0 | Juventus | Genoa |
| 12:30 CET (UTC+01:00) | Romero (yellow card) 3'; Sturaro 72'; Pandev 81', (yellow card) 82' | Report | Alex Sandro (yellow card) 6'; Cáceres (yellow card) 23'; Can (yellow card) 85' | Stadium: Stadio Luigi Ferraris; Attendance: 30,695; Referee: Marco Di Bello |

| 30 March 2019 29 | Juventus | 1–0 | Empoli | Turin |
| 18:00 CET (UTC+01:00) | Kean 72' | Report | | Stadium: Allianz Stadium; Attendance: 39,290; Referee: Federico La Penna |

| 2 April 2019 30 | Cagliari | 0–2 | Juventus | Cagliari |
| 21:00 CEST (UTC+02:00) | João Pedro (yellow card) 34'; Lykogiannis (yellow card) 39'; Srna (yellow card) 82' | Report | Kean (yellow card) 20', (goal) 85'; Bonucci 22'; Bernardeschi (yellow card) 90+3' | Stadium: Sardegna Arena; Attendance: 15,985; Referee: Piero Giacomelli |

| 6 April 2019 31 | Juventus | 2–1 | AC Milan | Turin |
| 18:00 CEST (UTC+02:00) | Bernardeschi (yellow card) 41'; Dybala 60' (pen.); Kean 84'; Mandžukić (yellow card) 86' | Report | Piątek 39'; Musacchio (yellow card) 59'; Çalhanoğlu (yellow card) 77' | Stadium: Allianz Stadium; Attendance: 40,057; Referee: Michael Fabbri |

| 13 April 2019 32 | SPAL | 2–1 | Juventus | Ferrara |
| 15:00 CEST (UTC+02:00) | Lazzari (yellow card) 28'; Bonifazi 49'; Floccari 74', (yellow card) 75'; Fares (yellow card) 83'; Missiroli (yellow card) 87'; Vicari (yellow card) 90+3' | Report | Kean 30'; Cuadrado (yellow card) 38'; Cancelo (yellow card) 45+1' | Stadium: Stadio Paolo Mazza; Attendance: 16,000; Referee: Daniele Doveri |

| 20 April 2019 33 | Juventus | 2–1 | Fiorentina | Turin |
| 18:00 CEST (UTC+02:00) | Alex Sandro 37'; Pezzella 53' (o.g.) | Report | Milenković 6'; Gerson (yellow card) 80' | Stadium: Allianz Stadium; Attendance: 40,339; Referee: Fabrizio Pasqua |

| 27 April 2019 34 | Internazionale | 1–1 | Juventus | Milan |
| 20:30 CEST (UTC+02:00) | Nainggolan 7'; Perišić (yellow card) 44' | Report | Cuadrado (yellow card) 40'; Chiellini (yellow card) 45+1'; Ronaldo 62'; Kean (yellow card) 90+2' | Stadium: San Siro; Attendance: 73,855; Referee: Luca Banti |

| 3 May 2019 35 | Juventus | 1–1 | Torino | Turin |
| 20:30 CEST (UTC+02:00) | Matuidi (yellow card) 34'; Bonucci (yellow card) 71'; Bernardeschi (yellow card) 82'; Ronaldo 84' | Report | Lukić 18', (yellow card) 68'; Rincón (yellow card) 49'; Bremer (yellow card) 90+3' | Stadium: Allianz Stadium; Attendance: 38,530; Referee: Daniele Orsato |

| 12 May 2019 36 | Roma | 2–0 | Juventus | Rome |
| 20:30 CEST (UTC+02:00) | Džeko (yellow card) 51', (goal) 90+2'; Zaniolo (yellow card) 75'; Florenzi 79'; Kolarov (yellow card) 90+1' | Report | Can (yellow card) 74' | Stadium: Stadio Olimpico; Attendance: 50,825; Referee: Davide Massa |

| 19 May 2019 37 | Juventus | 1–1 | Atalanta | Turin |
| 20:30 CEST (UTC+02:00) | Alex Sandro (yellow card) 14'; Ronaldo (yellow card) 45+3'; Matuidi (yellow card) 70'; Mandžukić 80'; Bernardeschi (red card) 90+2' | Report | Hateboer (yellow card) 28'; Iličić 33' | Stadium: Allianz Stadium; Attendance: 39,531; Referee: Gianluca Rocchi |

| 26 May 2019 38 | Sampdoria | 2–0 | Juventus | Genoa |
| 18:00 CEST (UTC+02:00) | Defrel 84'; Caprari 90+1' | Report | Rugani (yellow card) 52'; Portanova (yellow card) 90+3' | Stadium: Stadio Luigi Ferraris; Attendance: 22,856; Referee: Luigi Nasca |

=== Coppa Italia ===
| 12 January 2019 Round of 16 | Bologna | 0–2 | Juventus | Bologna |
| 20:45 CET (UTC+01:00) | Soriano (yellow card) 82' | Report | Bernardeschi 9', (yellow card) 30'; De Sciglio (yellow card) 44'; Kean 49'; Can (yellow card) 69' | Stadium: Stadio Renato Dall'Ara; Attendance: 15,469; Referee: Federico La Penna |

| 30 January 2019 Quarter-finals | Atalanta | 3–0 | Juventus | Bergamo |
| 20:45 CET (UTC+01:00) | Castagne 37'; Zapata 39', 86'; Djimsiti (yellow card) 43'; Freuler (yellow card) 45+1'; Hateboer (yellow card) 54' | Report | Pjanić (yellow card) 79'; Matuidi (yellow card) 88' | Stadium: Stadio Atleti Azzurri d'Italia; Attendance: 18,438; Referee: Fabrizio Pasqua |

=== UEFA Champions League ===
==== Group stage ====
| Pos | Team | Pld | W | D | L | GF | GA | GD | Pts | Qualification | JUV | MUN | VAL | YB |
|---|---|---|---|---|---|---|---|---|---|---|---|---|---|---|
| 1 | (Italy) Juventus | 6 | 4 | 0 | 2 | 9 | 4 | +5 | 12 | Advance to knockout phase | — | 1–2 | 1–0 | 3–0 |
| 2 | (England) Manchester United | 6 | 3 | 1 | 2 | 7 | 4 | +3 | 10 | Advance to knockout phase | 0–1 | — | 0–0 | 1–0 |
| 3 | (Spain) Valencia | 6 | 2 | 2 | 2 | 6 | 6 | 0 | 8 | Transfer to Europa League | 0–2 | 2–1 | — | 3–1 |
| 4 | (Switzerland) Young Boys | 6 | 1 | 1 | 4 | 4 | 12 | −8 | 4 | | 2–1 | 0–3 | 1–1 | — |

Source: UEFA
Rules for classification: Group stage tiebreakers

| 19 September 2018 1 | Valencia (Spain) | 0–2 | (Italy) Juventus | Valencia, Spain |
| 21:00 CEST (UTC+02:00) | Parejo (yellow card) 43', (penalty missed) 90+6'; Murillo (yellow card) 50'; Vezo (yellow card) 54' | Report | Ronaldo (red card) 29'; Pjanić 45' (pen.), 51' (pen.); Alex Sandro (yellow card) 59'; Szczęsny (yellow card) 81'; Rugani (yellow card) 90+6' | Stadium: Mestalla; Attendance: 46,067; Referee: Felix Brych (Germany) |

| 2 October 2018 2 | Juventus (Italy) | 3–0 | (Switzerland) Young Boys | Turin, Italy |
| 18:55 CEST (UTC+02:00) | Dybala 5', 33', 69' | Report | Bertone (yellow card) 24'; Sanogo (yellow card) 41'; Camara (yellow card) 75' (yellow-red card) 78' | Stadium: Allianz Stadium; Attendance: 40,961; Referee: Sergei Karasev (Russia) |

| 23 October 2018 3 | Manchester United (England) | 0–1 | (Italy) Juventus | Greater Manchester, England |
| 21:00 CEST (UTC+02:00) | Young (yellow card) 77' | Report | Dybala 17'; Matuidi (yellow card) 59'; Chiellini (yellow card) 83' | Stadium: Old Trafford; Attendance: 73,946; Referee: Milorad Mažić (Serbia) |

| 7 November 2018 4 | Juventus (Italy) | 1–2 | (England) Manchester United | Turin, Italy |
| 21:00 CET (UTC+01:00) | Alex Sandro (yellow card) 55'; Ronaldo 65'; Dybala (yellow card) 75' | Report | Matić (yellow card) 12'; Herrera (yellow card) 75'; Mata 86'; Bonucci 90' (o.g.); Martial (yellow card) 90+5' | Stadium: Allianz Stadium; Attendance: 41,470; Referee: Ovidiu Hațegan (Romania) |

| 27 November 2018 5 | Juventus (Italy) | 1–0 | (Spain) Valencia | Turin, Italy |
| 21:00 CET (UTC+01:00) | Bentancur (yellow card) 13'; Mandžukić 59'; Cuadrado (yellow card) 60'; Matuidi (yellow card) 83' | Report | Gayà (yellow card) 31'; Kondogbia (yellow card) 43'; Diakhaby (yellow card) 62'; Guedes (yellow card) 69'; Batshuayi (yellow card) 74' | Stadium: Allianz Stadium; Attendance: 39,070; Referee: Willie Collum (Scotland) |

| 12 December 2018 6 | Young Boys (Switzerland) | 2–1 | (Italy) Juventus | Bern, Switzerland |
| 21:00 CET (UTC+01:00) | Hoarau 30' (pen.), 68'; Camara (yellow card) 62'; Garcia (yellow card) 72'; Wölfli (yellow card) 83' | Report | Bernardeschi (yellow card) 64'; Dybala 80' | Stadium: Stade de Suisse; Attendance: 30,114; Referee: Tobias Stieler (Germany) |

==== Knockout phase ====
===== Round of 16 =====
| 20 February 2019 First leg | Atlético Madrid (Spain) | 2–0 | (Italy) Juventus | Madrid, Spain |
| 21:00 CET (UTC+01:00) | Costa (yellow card) 8'; Partey (yellow card) 45+3'; Giménez 78'; Godín 83'; Griezmann (yellow card) 89' | Report | Alex Sandro (yellow card) 55' | Stadium: Wanda Metropolitano; Attendance: 67,193; Referee: Felix Zwayer (Germany) |

| 12 March 2019 Second leg | Juventus (Italy) | 3–0 (3–2 agg.) | (Spain) Atlético Madrid | Turin, Italy |
| 21:00 CET (UTC+01:00) | Ronaldo 27', 48', 86' (pen.); Bernardeschi (yellow card) 64' | Report | Juanfran (yellow card) 73'; Giménez (yellow card) 86'; Vitolo (yellow card) 90+3' | Stadium: Allianz Stadium; Attendance: 40,884; Referee: Björn Kuipers (Netherlands) |

===== Quarter-finals =====
| 10 April 2019 First leg | Ajax (Netherlands) | 1–1 | (Italy) Juventus | Amsterdam, Netherlands |
| 21:00 CEST (UTC+02:00) | Tagliafico (yellow card) 41'; Neres 46'; De Jong (yellow card) 55'; Schöne (yellow card) 71'; Ekkelenkamp (yellow card) 90+4' | Report | Ronaldo 45'; Pjanić (yellow card) 83' | Stadium: Johan Cruyff Arena; Attendance: 50,390; Referee: Carlos del Cerro Grande (Spain) |

| 16 April 2019 Second leg | Juventus (Italy) | 1–2 (2–3 agg.) | (Netherlands) Ajax | Turin, Italy |
| 21:00 CEST (UTC+02:00) | Ronaldo 28', (yellow card) 90+3'; Can (yellow card) 69' | Report | Van de Beek 34'; De Ligt 67' | Stadium: Allianz Stadium; Attendance: 41,445; Referee: Clément Turpin (France) |

== Statistics ==
=== Appearances and goals ===
| No. | Pos | Nat | Player | Total | | Serie A | | Supercoppa Italiana | | Coppa Italia | | Champions League | |
| No. | Pos | Nat | Player | Apps | Goals | Apps | Goals | Apps | Goals | Apps | Goals | Apps | Goals |
Goalkeepers
| 1 | GK | (Poland) POL | Wojciech Szczęsny | 41 | 0 | 28 | 0 | 1 | 0 | 2 | 0 | 10 | 0 |
| 21 | GK | (Italy) ITA | Carlo Pinsoglio | 1 | 0 | 1 | 0 | 0 | 0 | 0 | 0 | 0 | 0 |
| 22 | GK | (Italy) ITA | Mattia Perin | 9 | 0 | 9 | 0 | 0 | 0 | 0 | 0 | 0 | 0 |
Defenders
| 2 | DF | (Italy) ITA | Mattia De Sciglio | 28 | 0 | 19+3 | 0 | 0 | 0 | 2 | 0 | 4 | 0 |
| 3 | DF | (Italy) ITA | Giorgio Chiellini | 34 | 1 | 22+3 | 1 | 1 | 0 | 2 | 0 | 6 | 0 |
| 4 | DF | (Uruguay) URU | Martin Cáceres | 9 | 0 | 7+2 | 0 | 0 | 0 | 0 | 0 | 0 | 0 |
| 12 | DF | (Brazil) BRA | Alex Sandro | 41 | 1 | 27+2 | 1 | 1 | 0 | 1+1 | 0 | 8+1 | 0 |
| 15 | DF | (Italy) ITA | Andrea Barzagli | 9 | 0 | 3+3 | 0 | 0 | 0 | 0 | 0 | 1+2 | 0 |
| 19 | DF | (Italy) ITA | Leonardo Bonucci | 40 | 3 | 26+2 | 3 | 1 | 0 | 1 | 0 | 10 | 0 |
| 20 | DF | (Portugal) POR | João Cancelo | 33 | 1 | 21+2 | 1 | 1 | 0 | 1+1 | 0 | 5+2 | 0 |
| 24 | DF | (Italy) ITA | Daniele Rugani | 20 | 2 | 15 | 2 | 0 | 0 | 1 | 0 | 3+1 | 0 |
| 37 | DF | (Italy) ITA | Leonardo Spinazzola | 12 | 0 | 6+4 | 0 | 0 | 0 | 1 | 0 | 1 | 0 |
| 43 | DF | (Italy) ITA | Paolo Gozzi | 1 | 0 | 1 | 0 | 0 | 0 | 0 | 0 | 0 | 0 |
Midfielders
| 5 | MF | (Bosnia and Herzegovina) BIH | Miralem Pjanić | 43 | 4 | 26+4 | 2 | 1 | 0 | 1+1 | 0 | 10 | 2 |
| 6 | MF | (Germany) GER | Sami Khedira | 17 | 2 | 8+2 | 2 | 0+1 | 0 | 2 | 0 | 2+2 | 0 |
| 14 | MF | (France) FRA | Blaise Matuidi | 41 | 3 | 28+2 | 3 | 1 | 0 | 1 | 0 | 8+1 | 0 |
| 23 | MF | (Germany) GER | Emre Can | 36 | 4 | 19+9 | 4 | 0+1 | 0 | 1 | 0 | 2+4 | 0 |
| 30 | MF | (Uruguay) URU | Rodrigo Bentancur | 39 | 2 | 21+9 | 2 | 1 | 0 | 1 | 0 | 6+1 | 0 |
| 34 | MF | (Italy) ITA | Manolo Portanova | 1 | 0 | 0+1 | 0 | 0 | 0 | 0 | 0 | 0 | 0 |
| 35 | MF | (Brazil) BRA | Matheus Pereira | 3 | 0 | 1+2 | 0 | 0 | 0 | 0 | 0 | 0 | 0 |
| 39 | MF | (Cyprus) CYP | Grigoris Kastanos | 1 | 0 | 1 | 0 | 0 | 0 | 0 | 0 | 0 | 0 |
| 41 | MF | (Italy) ITA | Hans Nicolussi | 3 | 0 | 0+3 | 0 | 0 | 0 | 0 | 0 | 0 | 0 |
Forwards
| 7 | FW | (Portugal) POR | Cristiano Ronaldo | 42 | 28 | 29+1 | 21 | 1 | 1 | 1+1 | 0 | 9 | 6 |
| 10 | FW | (Argentina) ARG | Paulo Dybala | 41 | 10 | 23+6 | 5 | 1 | 0 | 1+1 | 0 | 6+3 | 5 |
| 11 | FW | (Brazil) BRA | Douglas Costa | 25 | 1 | 7+10 | 1 | 1 | 0 | 1+1 | 0 | 1+4 | 0 |
| 16 | FW | (Colombia) COL | Juan Cuadrado | 22 | 1 | 13+4 | 1 | 0 | 0 | 0 | 0 | 4+1 | 0 |
| 17 | FW | (Croatia) CRO | Mario Mandžukić | 32 | 10 | 23+1 | 9 | 0 | 0 | 0 | 0 | 7+1 | 1 |
| 18 | FW | (Italy) ITA | Moise Kean | 16 | 7 | 5+7 | 6 | 0 | 0 | 1 | 1 | 0+3 | 0 |
| 33 | FW | (Italy) ITA | Federico Bernardeschi | 38 | 3 | 14+13 | 2 | 0+1 | 0 | 2 | 1 | 6+2 | 0 |
| 40 | FW | (England) ENG | Stephy Mavididi | 1 | 0 | 0+1 | 0 | 0 | 0 | 0 | 0 | 0 | 0 |
Players transferred out during the season
| 4 | DF | (Morocco) MAR | Medhi Benatia | 7 | 0 | 5 | 0 | 0 | 0 | 1 | 0 | 1 | 0 |

Last updated: 26 May 2019
Source: Competitions

=== Goalscorers ===
| Rank | No. | Pos | Nat | Name | Serie A | Supercoppa | Coppa Italia | UEFA CL | Total |
|---|---|---|---|---|---|---|---|---|---|
| 1 | 7 | FW | (Portugal) | Cristiano Ronaldo | 21 | 1 | 0 | 6 | 28 |
| 2 | 10 | FW | (Argentina) | Paulo Dybala | 5 | 0 | 0 | 5 | 10 |
| 2 | 17 | FW | (Croatia) | Mario Mandžukić | 9 | 0 | 0 | 1 | 10 |
| 4 | 18 | FW | (Italy) | Moise Kean | 6 | 0 | 1 | 0 | 7 |
| 5 | 5 | MF | (Bosnia and Herzegovina) | Miralem Pjanić | 2 | 0 | 0 | 2 | 4 |
| 5 | 23 | MF | (Germany) | Emre Can | 4 | 0 | 0 | 0 | 4 |
| 7 | 14 | MF | (France) | Blaise Matuidi | 3 | 0 | 0 | 0 | 3 |
| 7 | 19 | DF | (Italy) | Leonardo Bonucci | 3 | 0 | 0 | 0 | 3 |
| 7 | 33 | FW | (Italy) | Federico Bernardeschi | 2 | 0 | 1 | 0 | 3 |
| 10 | 6 | MF | (Germany) | Sami Khedira | 2 | 0 | 0 | 0 | 2 |
| 10 | 24 | DF | (Italy) | Daniele Rugani | 2 | 0 | 0 | 0 | 2 |
| 10 | 30 | MF | (Uruguay) | Rodrigo Bentancur | 2 | 0 | 0 | 0 | 2 |
| 13 | 3 | DF | (Italy) | Giorgio Chiellini | 1 | 0 | 0 | 0 | 1 |
| 13 | 11 | FW | (Brazil) | Douglas Costa | 1 | 0 | 0 | 0 | 1 |
| 13 | 12 | DF | (Brazil) | Alex Sandro | 1 | 0 | 0 | 0 | 1 |
| 13 | 16 | FW | (Colombia) | Juan Cuadrado | 1 | 0 | 0 | 0 | 1 |
| 13 | 20 | DF | (Portugal) | João Cancelo | 1 | 0 | 0 | 0 | 1 |
| Own goal | | | | | 4 | 0 | 0 | 0 | 4 |
| Totals | | | | | 70 | 1 | 2 | 14 | 87 |

Last updated: 26 May 2019

=== Disciplinary record ===
| No. | Pos | Nat | Name | Serie A | | | Supercoppa | | | Coppa Italia | | | UEFA CL | | | Total | | |
| No. | Pos | Nat | Name | Booked | (yellow card) (yellow-red card) | Sent off (straight red) | Booked | (yellow card) (yellow-red card) | Sent off (straight red) | Booked | (yellow card) (yellow-red card) | Sent off (straight red) | Booked | (yellow card) (yellow-red card) | Sent off (straight red) | Booked | (yellow card) (yellow-red card) | Sent off (straight red) |
| 1 | GK | (Poland) | Wojciech Szczęsny | 0 | 0 | 0 | 0 | 0 | 0 | 0 | 0 | 0 | 1 | 0 | 0 | 1 | 0 | 0 |
| 22 | GK | (Italy) | Mattia Perin | 1 | 0 | 0 | 0 | 0 | 0 | 0 | 0 | 0 | 0 | 0 | 0 | 1 | 0 | 0 |
| 2 | DF | (Italy) | Mattia De Sciglio | 2 | 0 | 0 | 0 | 0 | 0 | 1 | 0 | 0 | 0 | 0 | 0 | 3 | 0 | 0 |
| 3 | DF | (Italy) | Giorgio Chiellini | 2 | 0 | 0 | 0 | 0 | 0 | 0 | 0 | 0 | 1 | 0 | 0 | 3 | 0 | 0 |
| 4 | DF | (Uruguay) | Martin Cáceres | 1 | 0 | 0 | 0 | 0 | 0 | 0 | 0 | 0 | 0 | 0 | 0 | 1 | 0 | 0 |
| 12 | DF | (Brazil) | Alex Sandro | 6 | 0 | 0 | 1 | 0 | 0 | 0 | 0 | 0 | 3 | 0 | 0 | 10 | 0 | 0 |
| 19 | DF | (Italy) | Leonardo Bonucci | 1 | 0 | 0 | 0 | 0 | 0 | 0 | 0 | 0 | 0 | 0 | 0 | 1 | 0 | 0 |
| 20 | DF | (Portugal) | João Cancelo | 5 | 0 | 0 | 0 | 0 | 0 | 0 | 0 | 0 | 0 | 0 | 0 | 5 | 0 | 0 |
| 24 | DF | (Italy) | Daniele Rugani | 2 | 0 | 0 | 0 | 0 | 0 | 0 | 0 | 0 | 1 | 0 | 0 | 3 | 0 | 0 |
| 5 | MF | (Bosnia and Herzegovina) | Miralem Pjanić | 5 | 1 | 0 | 1 | 0 | 0 | 1 | 0 | 0 | 0 | 0 | 0 | 7 | 1 | 0 |
| 14 | MF | (France) | Blaise Matuidi | 3 | 0 | 0 | 0 | 0 | 0 | 1 | 0 | 0 | 2 | 0 | 0 | 6 | 0 | 0 |
| 16 | MF | (Colombia) | Juan Cuadrado | 2 | 0 | 0 | 0 | 0 | 0 | 0 | 0 | 0 | 1 | 0 | 0 | 3 | 0 | 0 |
| 23 | MF | (Germany) | Emre Can | 6 | 0 | 0 | 0 | 0 | 0 | 1 | 0 | 0 | 0 | 0 | 0 | 7 | 0 | 0 |
| 30 | MF | (Uruguay) | Rodrigo Bentancur | 7 | 1 | 0 | 0 | 0 | 0 | 0 | 0 | 0 | 1 | 0 | 0 | 8 | 1 | 0 |
| 7 | FW | (Portugal) | Cristiano Ronaldo | 2 | 0 | 0 | 0 | 0 | 0 | 0 | 0 | 0 | 0 | 0 | 1 | 2 | 0 | 1 |
| 10 | FW | (Argentina) | Paulo Dybala | 2 | 0 | 0 | 1 | 0 | 0 | 0 | 0 | 0 | 1 | 0 | 0 | 4 | 0 | 0 |
| 11 | FW | (Brazil) | Douglas Costa | 2 | 0 | 1 | 0 | 0 | 0 | 0 | 0 | 0 | 0 | 0 | 0 | 2 | 0 | 1 |
| 17 | FW | (Croatia) | Mario Mandžukić | 3 | 0 | 0 | 0 | 0 | 0 | 0 | 0 | 0 | 0 | 0 | 0 | 3 | 0 | 0 |
| 18 | FW | (Italy) | Moise Kean | 1 | 0 | 0 | 0 | 0 | 0 | 0 | 0 | 0 | 0 | 0 | 0 | 1 | 0 | 0 |
| 33 | FW | (Italy) | Federico Bernardeschi | 3 | 0 | 0 | 0 | 0 | 0 | 1 | 0 | 0 | 2 | 0 | 0 | 6 | 0 | 0 |
Players transferred out during the season
| 4 | DF | (Morocco) | Medhi Benatia | 2 | 0 | 0 | 0 | 0 | 0 | 0 | 0 | 0 | 0 | 0 | 0 | 2 | 0 | 0 |
| Total | | | | 58 | 2 | 1 | 3 | 0 | 0 | 5 | 0 | 0 | 13 | 0 | 1 | 79 | 2 | 2 |

Last updated: 2 April 2019

== Notes ==
A. The match was called off at the 72nd minute due to the annual tradition of pitch invasion.
