= Edoardo Ceria =

Italian footballer (born 1995)

Personal information
- Full name: Edoardo Ceria
- Date of birth: 26 May 1995 (age 31)
- Place of birth: Biella, Italy
- Height: 1.80 m (5 ft 11 in)
- Position: Forward

Team information
- Current team: US Fiorenzuola

Youth career
- Juventus

Senior career*
Years	Team	Apps	(Gls)
2013–2015	Juventus	0	(0)
2014–2015	→ Den Bosch (loan)	33	(4)
2015–2017	Atalanta	0	(0)
2015–2016	→ Arezzo (loan)	6	(0)
2016	→ FeralpiSalò (loan)	0	(0)
2016	→ Spartak Trnava (loan)	0	(0)
2017–2018	Den Bosch	0	(0)
2018–	Olympia Agnonese	8	(3)

International career
2013	Italy U18	1	(0)
2013	Italy U19	4	(0)
- * Club domestic league appearances and goals as of 22 September 2017

Edoardo Ceria (born 26 May 1995) is an Italian footballer who plays as a forward for US Fiorenzuola.

== Club career ==
Ceria began his career as a Juventus youth player. In September 2013, Atalanta acquired half of his registration rights for €0.80 million and half of Prince-Désir Gouano's for €0.45 million as part of a €1.25 million deal for Luca Barlocco. The deal left Ceria and Gouano temporarily with Juventus and Waalwijk respectively. In June 2014, the co-ownership of Barlocco and Ceria was renewed, together with the co-ownership of Emmanuello and Cais.

During the 2014–15 season, Ceria played on loan with FC Den Bosch. He made his league debut at 10 August 2014 against Sparta Rotterdam. At 15 August 2014, he scored his first two goals for Den Bosch against VVV Venlo.

On 24 June 2015, Atalanta acquired Boakye for €1.6 million, Emmanuello for €0.8 million (swap with Cais also for €0.8 million) and Ceria for €0.5 million (part of Barlocco deal for €0.95 million).
