= Andrea Favilli (footballer) =

Italian footballer (born 1997)

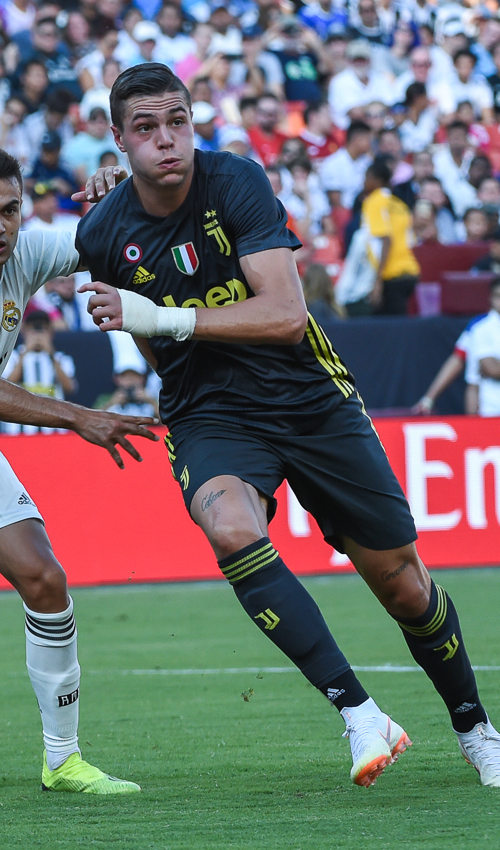
- Favilli with Juventus in 2018

Personal information
- Full name: Andrea Favilli
- Date of birth: 17 May 1997 (age 29)
- Place of birth: Pisa, Italy
- Height: 1.91 m (6 ft 3 in)
- Position: Striker

Team information
- Current team: Avellino
- Number: 99

Youth career
- 2013–2015: Livorno
- 2015–2016: → Juventus (loan)

Senior career*
Years	Team	Apps	(Gls)
2015–2017	Livorno	0	(0)
2015–2016	→ Juventus (loan)	1	(0)
2016–2017	→ Ascoli (loan)	30	(8)
2017–2018	Ascoli	12	(5)
2018–2019	Juventus	0	(0)
2018–2019	→ Genoa (loan)	6	(0)
2019–2025	Genoa	21	(0)
2020–2021	→ Hellas Verona (loan)	11	(2)
2021–2022	→ Monza (loan)	10	(0)
2022–2024	→ Ternana (loan)	49	(10)
2024–2025	→ Bari (loan)	22	(5)
2025–	Avellino	6	(1)

International career
2015–2016	Italy U19	12	(5)
2016–2017	Italy U20	10	(1)
2017–2019	Italy U21	9	(1)
Medal record
Men's football
Representing Italy
FIFA U-20 World Cup
Third place	2017 South Korea
UEFA European Under-19 Championship
Runner-up	2016 Germany
- * Club domestic league appearances and goals as of 10 May 2026

Andrea Favilli (born 17 May 1997) is an Italian professional footballer who plays as a striker for Serie B club Avellino.

== Club career ==
=== Livorno ===
Born in Pisa, Italy, Favilli started his career at Livorno's youth academy.

==== Loan to Juventus ====
Favilli was loaned out to Juventus on 2 February 2015. He scored 22 goals with the Primavera (under-19) team. Favilli made his Serie A debut on 7 February 2016, against Frosinone, replacing Álvaro Morata after 93 minutes in a 2–0 away win.

=== Ascoli ===
Favilli was loaned to Ascoli from Livorno for the 2016–17 season, and later sold to Ascoli for a reported €3 million. He scored 13 Serie B goals in his two-season stay.

=== Juventus ===
On 15 June 2018, Favilli was sold to Juventus for €7.5 million, plus bonuses up to a maximum of €1.25 million.

=== Genoa ===
On 10 August 2018, Favilli was signed by Genoa on a season-long loan for a fee of €5 million, with an option to buy for an additional €7 million. They later signed him permanently from the beginning of the next season. Favilli played 29 games in three seasons at Genoa.

==== Loans to Verona and Monza ====
On 18 September 2020, Favilli signed with Hellas Verona on loan until the end of the season. He made his club debut on 27 September, during which he scored his first Serie A goal in a 1–0 home win over Udinese. Favilli scored two goals in 11 appearances.

On 31 August 2021, Favilli moved to Serie B side Monza on one-year loan with an option for purchase.

==== Loans to Ternana and Bari ====
On 12 August 2022, Favilli was loaned to Ternana, with an option to buy. On 15 August 2023, Favilli returned to Ternana on loan with an obligation to buy.

On 30 August 2024, Favilli moved on loan to Bari.

=== Avellino ===
On 3 July 2025, Favilli signed a two-season contract with Avellino.

== International career ==
With the Italy U19 team he took part at the 2016 UEFA European Under-19 Championship, reaching the final of the tournament. With the Italy U20's, he took part at the 2017 FIFA U-20 World Cup, where Italy finished in third place. He made his debut with the Italy U21 team on 23 March 2017, in a friendly match against Poland.

== Career statistics ==
=== Club ===
As of match played 29 May 2022

Appearances and goals by club, season and competition
Club	Season	League			Coppa Italia		Continental		Total	
Club	Season	Division	Apps	Goals	Apps	Goals	Apps	Goals	Apps	Goals
Livorno	2014–15	Serie B	0	0	0	0	—		0	0
Livorno	2015–16	Serie B	—		—		—		0	0
Livorno	2016–17	Lega Pro	—		—		—		0	0
Livorno	Total		0	0	0	0	0	0	0	0
Juventus (loan)	2015–16	Serie A	1	0	0	0	0	0	1	0
Ascoli (loan)	2016–17	Serie B	30	8	0	0	—		30	8
Ascoli	2017–18	Serie B	12	5	2	3	—		14	8
Juventus	2018–19	Serie A	—		—		—		0	0
Genoa (loan)	2018–19	Serie A	6	0	0	0	—		6	0
Genoa	2019–20	Serie A	20	0	2	1	—		22	1
Genoa	2020–21	Serie A	—		—		—		0	0
Genoa	2021–22	Serie A	1	0	0	0	—		1	0
Genoa	Total		21	0	2	1	0	0	23	1
Hellas Verona (loan)	2020–21	Serie A	11	2	0	0	—		11	2
Monza (loan)	2021–22	Serie B	10	0	0	0	0	0	10	0
Career total			91	15	4	4	0	0	95	19

== Honours ==
Juventus

- Serie A: 2015–16

Italy U19

- UEFA European Under-19 Championship runner-up: 2016

Italy U20

- FIFA U-20 World Cup bronze medal: 2017
