= Luca Barlocco =

Italian footballer (born 1995)

Personal information
- Date of birth: 20 February 1995 (age 31)
- Place of birth: Merate, Italy
- Height: 1.78 m (5 ft 10 in)
- Position: Left back

Team information
- Current team: Pro Patria
- Number: 2

Youth career
- Atalanta
- 2013–2014: Juventus

Senior career*
Years	Team	Apps	(Gls)
2014–2019	Juventus	0	(0)
2014–2015	→ Novara (loan)	1	(0)
2015–2016	→ Carrarese (loan)	33	(0)
2016–2017	→ Alessandria (loan)	33	(1)
2017	→ Pro Vercelli (loan)	3	(0)
2018	→ Alessandria (loan)	15	(1)
2018–2019	→ Piacenza (loan)	41	(1)
2019–2021	Vicenza	42	(1)
2021–2023	Virtus Entella	43	(1)
2024	Monopoli	17	(0)
2024–	Pro Patria	1	(0)

International career
2010–2011	Italy U-16	3	(0)
2011–2012	Italy U-17	7	(0)
2012–2013	Italy U-18	9	(0)
- * Club domestic league appearances and goals as of 6 January 2025

Luca Barlocco (born 20 February 1995) is an Italian footballer who plays as a left back for Serie D club Pro Patria.

== Club career ==
=== Atalanta ===
Born in Merate, Lombardy, Barlocco started his career at Lombard club Atalanta.

=== Juventus ===
On 2 September 2013 Juventus signed half of the registration rights for €1.25 million, with half of the registration rights of Edoardo Ceria and Prince-Désir Gouano moved to Atalanta for €800,000 and €450,000 respectively. Barlocco signed a 5-year contract.

In June 2014 the co-ownership deals were renewed (except Gouano and Troisi). On 26 July Barlocco was signed by Piedmontese club Novara in a temporary deal. He was injured in the 2014–15 Coppa Italia match against Latina in August. Barlocco played his only league game on 6 September.

On 16 January 2015 the loan was terminated. On 19 January 2015 Barlocco was signed by Como.

On 24 June 2015 Juventus signed Barlocco for €950,000 (€450,000 cash plus Ceria).

On 31 July Barlocco, Cais, Gerbaudo and Tavanti were signed by Carrarese.

In the season 2016–17 took the loan, for a season, to Alessandria.

In Summer 2017 he is again loaned for Pro Vercelli for a season.

On 30 June 2019, Barlocco joined Vicenza on a two-year contract with an option for one further year.

On 6 July 2021, he signed a two-year contract with Virtus Entella.

== International career ==
Barlocco was a player in 2012 UEFA European Under-17 Championship qualification. He made 2 starts in the first stage of qualification: Daniele Zoratto had replaced Ivan Rondanini and Filipo Penna (who played the first match) with Barlocco and Luca Lotti.
