= Erik Gerbi =

Italian footballer (born 2000)

Personal information
- Date of birth: 11 June 2000 (age 26)
- Place of birth: Ivrea, Italy
- Height: 1.81 m (5 ft 11 in)
- Position: Defender

Team information
- Current team: Treviso

Youth career
- –2018: Pro Vercelli

Senior career*
Years	Team	Apps	(Gls)
2018–2019	Pro Vercelli	14	(3)
2019–2020	Juventus	0	(0)
2019	→ Pro Vercelli (loan)	10	(0)
2019–2020	→ Juventus U23 (res.)	3	(0)
2020	→ Sampdoria (loan)	0	(0)
2020–2024	Sampdoria	0	(0)
2020–2021	→ Teramo (loan)	16	(0)
2021–2022	→ Politehnica Timișoara (loan)	19	(4)
2022–2023	→ Pro Sesto (loan)	37	(8)
2023–2024	→ Lumezzane (loan)	26	(3)
2024–2026	Carpi	56	(8)
2026–	Treviso	0	(0)
- * Club domestic league appearances and goals as of 30 April 2026

Erik Gerbi (born 11 June 2000) is an Italian footballer who plays as a forward for Serie C club Treviso.

== Club career ==
He made his Serie B debut for Pro Vercelli on 18 May 2018 in a game against Cittadella as an 82nd-minute substitute for Claudio Morra.

On 31 January 2019, he was purchased by Juventus for €1.45 million and loaned back to Pro Vercelli until the end of the 2018–19 season. In the same window Juventus also sold Simone Emmanuello to Pro Vercelli for €0.95 million as part of the deal.

On 30 January 2020, Sampdoria acquired his rights on loan with an obligation to buy.

On 5 October 2020 he joined Teramo on loan. On 1 August 2022, Gerbi was loaned to Pro Sesto. On 23 July 2023, he moved on loan to Lumezzane.

On 23 July 2024, he joined Carpi on permanent basis.
