= Oumar Toure (footballer) =

Guinean footballer (born 1998)

Personal information
- Date of birth: 18 September 1998 (age 28)
- Place of birth: Conakry, Guinea
- Height: 5 ft 8 in (1.72 m)
- Position: Midfielder

Youth career
- Santarcangelo
- 2014–2015: → Inter Milan (loan)
- 2015–2016: → Juventus (loan)
- 2016–2018: Juventus

Senior career*
Years	Team	Apps	(Gls)
2018–2019	Juventus U23	0	(0)
2018	→ WSG Wattens (loan)	14	(0)
2018–2019	→ FK Kukësi (loan)	0	(0)
2019	→ Sparta (loan)	5	(0)

International career
- Guinea U20
- * Club domestic league appearances and goals as of 14:20, 15 May 2019 (UTC)

Oumar Toure (born 18 September 1998) is a Guinean professional footballer who plays as a midfielder.
