= Davide Cais =

Italian footballer (born 1994)

Personal information
- Date of birth: 17 February 1994 (age 32)
- Place of birth: Vittorio Veneto, Italy
- Height: 1.80 m (5 ft 11 in)
- Position: Forward

Team information
- Current team: Conegliano
- Number: 11

Youth career
- Atalanta

Senior career*
Years	Team	Apps	(Gls)
2013–2014	Atalanta	0	(0)
2013–2014	→ Reggiana (loan)	14	(1)
2014–2019	Juventus	0	(0)
2014–2015	→ Gubbio (loan)	31	(3)
2015–2016	→ Carrarese (loan)	30	(7)
2016	→ Pontedera (loan)	20	(1)
2017–2018	→ Carrarese (loan)	37	(3)
2018–2019	→ Albissola (loan)	33	(6)
2019–2020	Arzignano	25	(2)
2020–2021	Carrarese	12	(0)
2021	Fermana	16	(1)
2021–2023	Vittorio Falmec	58	(19)
2023–	Conegliano	43	(10)

International career
2011	Italy U-17	1	(0)
- * Club domestic league appearances and goals as of 15:14, 26 December 2024 (UTC)

Davide Cais (born 17 February 1994) is an Italian footballer who plays as a forward for Eccellenza side Conegliano.

== Career ==
=== Atalanta ===
Born in Vittorio Veneto, Cais started his career at Lombard club Atalanta. He was a member of the reserve team until 2013. On 1 August he was signed by Reggiana. At Reggio, he met his future Juventus "team-mate" Michele Cavion.

=== Juventus ===
On 31 January 2014 Juventus FC signed half of the registration rights of Cais for €40,000 cash and half of the registration rights of Simone Emmanuello. The deals made both clubs received a paper profit by the increase in intangible assets – the player contracts. Cais signed a 4 1/2-year contract; he immediately returned to Reggio Emilia for the rest of the 2013–14 Lega Pro Prima Divisione season. In June 2014 the co-ownership deal were renewed.

In August 2014 Cais was signed by Gubbio in a temporary deal.

On 24 June 2015 Juventus bought the remaining registration rights of Cais for €800,000, with the remaining registration rights of Emmanuello moved to opposite direction also for €800,000.

On 31 July 2015 Cais, Barlocco, Gerbaudo and Tavanti were signed by Carrarese.

On 22 July 2016 signed by Pontedera from Juventus. Circa 2016–17 season Cais also signed a new 3-year contract with Juve.

In January 2017 he returned to Juventus, but immediately loaned to Carrarese. He also spent 2017–18 season with Carrarese.

=== Serie C ===
On 11 July 2019, he signed with the newly promoted Serie C club Arzignano.

On 28 September 2020 he returned to Carrarese once again.

On 1 February 2021 he moved to Fermana.

=== Eccellenza ===
On 30 July 2021, he joined his hometown club Vittorio Falmec, playing in the fifth-tier Eccellenza. Two years later, in the summer 2023, he moved to fellow league club, Conegliano.
