= King Udoh =

Association football player (born 1997)

Personal information
- Full name: King Paul Akpan Udoh
- Date of birth: 5 September 1997 (age 29)
- Place of birth: Reggio Emilia, Italy
- Height: 1.87 m (6 ft 1 1/2 in)
- Position: Forward

Team information
- Current team: Giugliano
- Number: 47

Youth career
- –2011: Reggiana
- 2011–2016: Juventus
- 2011–2012: → Reggiana (loan)

Senior career*
| Years | Team | Apps | (Gls) |
| 2016–2018 | Juventus | 3 | (1) |
| 2016 | → Virtus Lanciano (loan) | 0 | (0) |
| 2016–2017 | → Pontedera (loan) | 18 | (1) |
| 2017 | → Fernana (loan) | 0 | (0) |
| 2018 | → Fano (loan) | 2 | (0) |
| 2018–2019 | Viareggio | 26 | (8) |
| 2019–2020 | Pianese | 23 | (5) |
| 2020–2022 | Olbia | 70 | (19) |
| 2022–2024 | Cesena | 20 | (4) |
| 2023–2024 | → Gubbio (loan) | 35 | (11) |
| 2024–2025 | Trapani | 10 | (2) |
| 2025 | → Triestina (loan) | 13 | (1) |
| 2025–2026 | Pro Patria | 29 | (6) |
| 2026– | Giugliano | 1 | (0) |
- * Club domestic league appearances and goals as of 28 August 2026

King Paul Akpan Udoh (born 5 September 1997) is an Italian association footballer who plays as a forward for Serie C Group C club Giugliano.

== Club career ==
Having started his career with Reggiana, Udoh moved to Juventus in 2011, and was immediately loaned back for a year. After progressing through the youth ranks of Juventus, Udoh secured a loan move to Serie B side Virtus Lanciano in 2016, with an option to buy at the end of the season. Failing to impress, he was returned to Juve, and then loaned to Lega Pro side Pontedera later the same year.

On 14 July 2019, he signed with Pianese.

On 13 September 2020 he joined Olbia on a 2-year contract.

On 26 August 2022, Udoh signed a three-year deal with Cesena. On 1 August 2023, he was loaned to Gubbio, with an option to buy.

== Coronavirus infection ==
On 27 February 2020, Udoh became the first professional footballer to be infected by the virus in Italy. According to the publications Udoh was put under quarantine after showing symptoms of the virus.

== Personal life ==
Born in Italy, Udoh is of Yoruba-Nigerian descent. On 27 February 2020, Udoh became the first professional footballer to be diagnosed with the COVID-19.
