= Simone Emmanuello =

Italian footballer (born 1994)

Personal information
- Date of birth: 25 April 1994 (age 32)
- Place of birth: Chieri, Italy
- Height: 1.88 m (6 ft 2 in)
- Position: Midfielder

Team information
- Current team: Pontedera
- Number: 7

Youth career
- Juventus

Senior career*
Years	Team	Apps	(Gls)
2014–2018	Atalanta	0	(0)
2014–2017	→ Pro Vercelli (loan)	71	(6)
2017	→ Perugia (loan)	7	(0)
2018	→ Cesena (loan)	6	(0)
2018–2019	Juventus U23	17	(0)
2019–2026	Pro Vercelli	122	(5)
2019–2020	→ Vicenza (loan)	7	(0)
2026–	Pontedera	9	(0)

International career
2010–2011	Italy U-17	11	(1)
2011	Italy U-18	1	(0)
2012	Italy U-19	1	(0)
2015	Italy U-20	2	(1)
- * Club domestic league appearances and goals as of 30 April 2026

Simone Emmanuello (born 25 April 1994) is an Italian professional footballer who plays as a midfielder for Serie D club Pontedera.

== Career ==
=== Juventus ===
Emmanuello was a youth product of Juventus. He was an overage player for the under-19 youth team in the first half of 2013–14 season.

=== Atalanta ===
On 31 January 2014 Juventus swapped half of the registration rights of Emmanuello (for €1.5 million price tag) with the 50% rights of Davide Cais (for €1.54 million), The deals made Juventus register a profit of about €1.5 million in the 2013–14 season (a potential profit of €1.5 million would be registered in the future season) and about €3.1 million in Atlanta's 2014 financial year (a potential loss of €1.54 million would be registered in the future season), despite the increase was in terms of intangible assets. Emmanuello immediately left for Pro Vercelli.

On 24 June 2015 Atlanta bought Emmanuello outright for another €800,000, with Cais moved to Juventus also for €800,000.

==== Pro Vercelli (loan) ====
On 31 January 2014 Emmanuello was signed by Piedmontese club Pro Vercelli in a temporary deal, re-joining Juventus team-mate Giuseppe Ruggiero.

Pro Vercelli won promotion back to Serie B in 2014. In June 2014 the loan and co-ownership were renewed. Emmanuello remained in Pro Vercelli for 2014–15 season. In June 2015 Emmanuello joined Atalanta outright. He remained in Vercelli again for 2015–16 season, as no.14 of the first team.

==== Perugia & Cesena (loan) ====
On 25 July 2017, he joined Serie B club Perugia on loan.

For the next season, on 11 January 2018, he was loaned Serie B club Cesena.

=== Juventus second spell ===
In August 2018 Emmanuello was re-signed by his mother club Juventus, however, for their B team Juventus Under 23 only. He received his first competitive call-up for the team in 2018–19 Coppa Italia Serie C on 20 August. Emmanuello made his league debut against Alessandria on 16 September. As Juventus B also used Stadio Giuseppe Moccagatta as their home stadium, the match was also a local derby.

=== Return to Pro Vercelli ===
On 31 January 2019, his rights were sold by Juventus to Pro Vercelli as part of Erik Gerbi's deal.

==== Loan to Vicenza ====
On 11 July 2019, he joined Vicenza on loan. On 31 January 2020, the loan was terminated by Pro Vercelli.
