= Christian Tavanti =

Italian footballer (born 1995)

Personal information
- Full name: Christian Tavanti
- Date of birth: 19 May 1995 (age 31)
- Place of birth: Pietrasanta, Italy
- Height: 1.86 m (6 ft 1 in)
- Position: Right back

Youth career
- −2011: Viareggio
- 2010−2011: Genoa (loan)
- 2011–2015: Juventus

Senior career*
Years	Team	Apps	(Gls)
2014−2017	Juventus	0	(0)
2014−2015	→ Santarcangelo (loan)	2	(0)
2015	→ Mantova (loan)	7	(1)
2015−2016	→ Carrarese (loan)	16	(0)
2016−2017	→ Sambenedettese (loan)	8	(0)
2017−2019	Lucchese	40	(0)

International career^{‡}
2012	Italy U17	1	(0)
2012–2013	Italy U18	4	(0)
- * Club domestic league appearances and goals as of 7 April 2018 ‡ National team caps and goals as of 22 January 2017

Christian Tavanti (born 19 May 1995) is an Italian professional footballer. Mainly a right-sided defender, Tavanti has also been utilised further forward on the right-hand side in a wide midfield role.

== Club career ==
=== Early career ===
Tavanti began his career in the youth teams of Viareggio in Tuscany, near to where he was born. In July 2010, Serie A side Genoa took Tavanti on loan within their youth sector, as he was still only 15 years old. He spent a year in Liguria before being signed by Italian giants Juventus upon his return to Viareggio in 2011.

=== Juventus ===
Tavanti began playing for the Juventus youth teams, beginning in the under-17 team and making his way up to the under-19 team by 2014. Tavanti was part of the Primavera side that won the 2012–13 Coppa Italia Primavera, and the subsequent Supercoppa Primavera. He was loaned to Santarcangelo in 2014, making 2 first team appearances before returning to Juventus at the beginning of February 2015. The following day, Tavanti was again loaned out, this time to Lega Pro side Mantova, during which he scored his first professional goal with a header in a 2–0 victory over Torres before returning to Turin on 30 June 2015. In July 2015, Carrarese took Tavanti on a one-year loan, during which he made 16 appearances; 14 coming in the league and a further 2 in the Coppa Italia. Still unable to break into the Juventus first team, Tavanti made a further loan in July 2016, joining Sambenedettese for the 2016–17 Lega Pro season. He made his debut for Samb in the Coppa Italia Lega Pro fixture against Gubbio, playing 90 minutes at right-midfield in a 2–1 loss. His league debut came nearly two months later, coming on as a late substitute in a 2–2 draw against Venezia.

=== Lucchese ===
In January 2017, Tavanti signed with Lucchese on a deal until 30 June 2017. Tavanti's nickname is “seccin bastru”
