= Matteo Gerbaudo =

Italian footballer (born 1995)

Personal information
- Date of birth: 10 May 1995 (age 31)
- Place of birth: Moncalieri, Italy
- Height: 1.80 m (5 ft 11 in)
- Position: Midfielder

Team information
- Current team: Ostiamare
- Number: 16

Youth career
- 2001–2014: Juventus

Senior career*
| Years | Team | Apps | (Gls) |
| 2014–2016 | Juventus | 0 | (0) |
| 2014–2015 | → Vicenza (loan) | 3 | (0) |
| 2015 | → SPAL (loan) | 7 | (0) |
| 2015–2016 | → Carrarese (loan) | 18 | (0) |
| 2016–2018 | Pordenone | 3 | (0) |
| 2017–2018 | → Cuneo (loan) | 33 | (2) |
| 2018–2019 | Avellino | 34 | (2) |
| 2019–2020 | Foggia | 20 | (3) |
| 2020–2023 | Mantova | 105 | (5) |
| 2023–2024 | Piacenza | 26 | (4) |
| 2024–2026 | Nocerina | 33 | (4) |
| 2025–2026 | Ancona | 33 | (2) |
| 2026– | Ostiamare | 0 | (0) |

International career
| 2013 | Italy U18 | 1 | (0) |
- * Club domestic league appearances and goals as of 23 August 2026

Matteo Gerbaudo (born 10 May 1995) is an Italian football player who plays for Serie C Group B club Ostiamare.

== Club career ==
He played in the youth teams of Juventus. He made his Serie B debut for Vicenza on 7 September 2014 in a game against Trapani.

In July 2023, Gerbaudo moved to Piacenza in Serie D.
