= 2013–14 Juventus FC season =

Italian football club season

Juventus
2013–14 season
- President: Andrea Agnelli
- Manager: Antonio Conte
- Stadium: Juventus Stadium
- Serie A: 1st
- Coppa Italia: Quarter-finals
- Supercoppa Italiana: Winners
- UEFA Champions League: Group stage
- UEFA Europa League: Semi-finals
- Top goalscorer: League: Carlos Tevez (19); All: Carlos Tevez (21)
- Highest home attendance: 40,710 vs Lyon (10 April 2014, Europa League)
- Lowest home attendance: 17,716 vs Avellino (18 December 2013, Coppa Italia)
- Average home league attendance: 39,140
Home colours	Away colours	Third colours

The 2013–14 season was Juventus Football Club's 116th in existence and seventh consecutive season in the top flight of Italian football. The club won their third Serie A title in a row with a record 102 points and 33 wins, finishing 17 points ahead of second-place Roma.

== Players ==
=== Squad information ===
Players and squad numbers last updated on 1 February 2014.
Note: Flags indicate national team as has been defined under FIFA eligibility rules. Players may hold more than one non-FIFA nationality.

No.	Name	Nat	Position(s)	Date of birth (Age at end of season)	Signed in	Contract ends	Signed from	Apps.	Goals	Notes
Goalkeepers
1	Gianluigi Buffon	(Italy)	GK	28 January 1978 (aged 36)	2001	2015	(Italy) Parma	48	0	Captain
30	Marco Storari	(Italy)	GK	7 January 1977 (aged 37)	2010	2014	(Italy) Milan	8	0	
34	Rubinho	(Brazil)	GK	4 August 1982 (aged 31)	2012	2013	Unattached	1	0	
Defenders
3	Giorgio Chiellini	(Italy)	CB / LB	14 August 1984 (aged 29)	2005	2015	(Italy) Fiorentina	44	4	Vice-captain
4	Martín Cáceres	(Uruguay)	CB / RB	7 April 1987 (aged 27)	2012	2016	(Spain) Sevilla	30	1	
5	Angelo Ogbonna	(Italy)	CB	23 May 1988 (aged 26)	2013	2018	(Italy) Torino	25	0	
13	Federico Peluso	(Italy)	CB / LB	20 January 1984 (aged 30)	2013	2013	(Italy) Atalanta	14	1	
15	Andrea Barzagli	(Italy)	CB	8 May 1981 (aged 33)	2011	2015	(Germany) Wolfsburg	32	0	
19	Leonardo Bonucci	(Italy)	CB	1 May 1987 (aged 27)	2010	2017	(Italy) Bari	43	3	
26	Stephan Lichtsteiner	(Switzerland)	RB / RWB	16 January 1984 (aged 30)	2011	2015	(Italy) Lazio	36	3	
Midfielders
6	Paul Pogba	(France)	DM / CM	15 March 1993 (aged 21)	2012	2016	(England) Manchester United	51	9	
7	Simone Pepe	(Italy)	LW / RW	30 August 1983 (aged 30)	2014	2015	(Italy) Udinese	3	0	
8	Claudio Marchisio	(Italy)	CM / AM	19 January 1986 (aged 28)	2006	2016	(Italy) Youth Sector	43	4	Vice-captain
20	Simone Padoin	(Italy)	RM / CM	18 March 1984 (aged 30)	2012	2016	(Italy) Atalanta	25	1	
21	Andrea Pirlo	(Italy)	CM / AM / DM	19 May 1979 (aged 35)	2011	2014	(Italy) Milan	45	6	
22	Kwadwo Asamoah	(Ghana)	CM / LM / LWB	9 December 1988 (aged 25)	2012	2017	(Italy) Udinese	47	2	
23	Arturo Vidal	(Chile)	DM / CM	22 May 1987 (aged 27)	2011	2016	(Germany) Bayer Leverkusen	46	18	
33	Mauricio Isla	(Chile)	RW / RM / CM	12 June 1988 (aged 26)	2012	2017	(Italy) Udinese	27	0	
Forwards
9	Mirko Vučinić	(Montenegro)	ST / CF	1 October 1983 (aged 30)	2011	2015	(Italy) Roma	18	2	
10	Carlos Tevez	(Argentina)	ST / CF	5 February 1984 (aged 30)	2013	2016	(England) Manchester City	48	21	
12	Sebastian Giovinco	(Italy)	ST / LW / CF	26 January 1987 (aged 27)	2012	2015	(Italy) Parma	30	3	
14	Fernando Llorente	(Spain)	ST / CF	26 February 1985 (aged 29)	2013	2017	(Spain) Athletic Bilbao	45	18	
18	Dani Osvaldo	(Italy)	ST / CF	12 January 1986 (aged 28)	2014	2014	(England) Southampton	18	3	on loan from Southampton
27	Fabio Quagliarella	(Italy)	ST / CF	31 January 1983 (aged 31)	2010	2015	(Italy) Napoli	23	4	

=== Non-playing staff ===
Position	Staff
Manager	(Italy) Antonio Conte
Assistant coach	(Italy) Angelo Alessio
First-team Coach	(Italy) Massimo Carrera
Goalkeepers' coach	(Italy) Claudio Filippi
Head of Fitness	(Italy) Paolo Bertelli
Fitness coach	(Spain) Julio Tous
Fitness coach	(Italy) Costantino Coratti
Head of Training Check	(Italy) Roberto Sassi

Source: Juventus.com (archive link)

== Transfers ==
=== In ===
No.	Pos.	Nat.	Name	Age	EU	Moving from	Type	Transfer window	Ends	Transfer fee	Source
10	FW	(Argentina)	Carlos Tevez	29	Non-EU	Manchester City	Full ownership	Summer	2016	€10M	Juventus.com
14	FW	(Spain)	Fernando Llorente	28	EU	Athletic Bilbao	Full ownership	Summer	2017	Free	Juventus.com
5	DF	(Italy)	Angelo Ogbonna	24	EU	Torino	Full ownership	Summer	2018	€13M	Juventus.com
	FW	(Italy)	Simone Russini	17	EU	Ternana	Co-ownership	Winter	2016	€0.65M	
18	FW	(Italy)	Dani Osvaldo	27	EU	Southampton (England)	Loan	Winter	2014	Undisclosed	

Last updated: 11 July 2013

Total spending: ▼€23 million

=== Out ===
No.	Pos.	Nat.	Name	Age	EU	Moving to	Type	Transfer window	Transfer fee	Source
	DF	(Italy)	Alberto Masi	20	EU	Ternana	Co-ownership	Summer	€2M	
	FW	(Italy)	Simone Russini	17	EU	Ternana	Loan	Summer	Free	
24	MF	(Italy)	Emanuele Giaccherini	28	EU	Sunderland	Full ownership	Summer	Loan	
24	MF	(Italy)	Emanuele Giaccherini	28	EU	Sunderland	Full ownership	Summer	€7.5M	
4	MF	(Brazil)	Felipe Melo	30	Non-EU	Galatasaray	Full ownership	Summer	€3.75M	
42	FW	(Ghana)	Richmond Boakye	20	Non-EU	Elche	Loan	Summer	Free	
32	FW	(Italy)	Alessandro Matri	29	EU	Milan	Full ownership	Summer	€11M	
	MF	(Italy)	Fausto Rossi	23	EU	Valladolid (Spain)	Loan	Summer	Free	
17	DM	(Italy)	Luca Marrone	23	EU	Sassuolo	Co-ownership	Summer	€4.5M	
11	LB	(Italy)	Paolo De Ceglie	26	EU	Genoa	Loan	Winter	Free	
16	RB	(Italy)	Marco Motta	26	EU	Genoa	Loan	Winter	Free	

Last updated: 30 August 2013
Total income: ▲€26.75 million

== Pre-season and friendlies ==
17 July 2013 Friendly	Rep. Valdostana	0–7	Juventus	Saint-Vincent
17:00 CEST (UTC+02:00)		http://www.gazzetta.it/Calcio/Squadre/Juventus/17-07-2013/nuova-juventus-si-presenta-prima-uscita-17-la-rappresentativa-val-d-aosta-20794302801.shtml (Italian)	Motta 31'; Tevez 45+1'; Matri 50', 90+1'; Vučinić 71' (pen.), 75' (pen.); Mattiello 89'	Stadium: Stadio Comunale "Piergiorgio Perucca"; Attendance: 3,000

23 July 2013 TIM Trophy	Juventus	0–0 (6–7 p)	Milan	Reggio Emilia
20:45 CEST (UTC+02:00)		Report		Stadium: Mapei Stadium – Città del Tricolore; Attendance: 20,084; Referee: Andrea Gervasoni
	Penalties
	Vidal (penalty scored); Lichtsteiner (penalty missed); Tevez (penalty scored); Asamoah (penalty scored); Vučinić (penalty scored); Peluso (penalty scored); De Ceglie (penalty scored); Padoin (penalty missed)		(penalty scored) Robinho; (penalty scored) De Jong; (penalty scored) Mexès; (penalty scored) Niang; (penalty missed) Nocerino; (penalty scored) Bonera; (penalty scored) Traoré; (penalty scored) Zaccardo

23 July 2013 TIM Trophy	Juventus	0–0 (4–3 p)	Sassuolo	Reggio Emilia
21:45 CEST (UTC+02:00)		http://www.gazzetta.it/Calcio/Squadre/SerieA/23-07-2013/trofeo-tim-milan-batte-juventus-rigori-decide-abbiati-para-tiro-padoin-20832114866.shtml (Italian)		Stadium: Mapei Stadium – Città del Tricolore; Attendance: 20,084; Referee: Sebastiano Peruzzo
	Penalties
	Quagliarella (penalty missed); Büchel (penalty scored); García (penalty scored); Matri (penalty missed); Vidal (penalty scored); Motta (penalty scored)		(penalty scored) Zaza; (penalty scored) Kurtić; (penalty missed) Alexe; (penalty scored) Missiroli; (penalty missed) Terranova; (penalty missed) Berardi

1 August 2013 ICC	Juventus	1–1 (a.e.t.) (5–6 p)	Everton	San Francisco, California, United States
05:00 CEST (UTC+02:00)	Asamoah 80'	Report	Mirallas 61'	Stadium: AT&T Park; Attendance: 22,208; Referee: Ricardo Salazar (United States)
	Penalties
	Matri (penalty scored); Asamoah (penalty scored); Vučinić (penalty scored); Vidal (penalty scored); Pirlo (penalty missed); Motta (penalty scored); Peluso (penalty missed)		(penalty missed) Osman; (penalty scored) Barkley; (penalty scored) Mirallas; (penalty scored) Jagielka; (penalty scored) Oviedo; (penalty scored) Stones; (penalty scored) Coleman

3 August 2013 ICC	Juventus	1–3	Los Angeles Galaxy	Los Angeles, California, United States
05:00 CEST (UTC+02:00)	Matri 39'	Report	Gonzalez 36'; Donovan 60'; Keane 89'	Stadium: Dodger Stadium; Attendance: 40,681

6 August 2013 ICC	Internazionale	1–1 (a.e.t.) (8–7 p)	Juventus	Miami, Florida, United States
00:30 CEST (UTC+02:00)	Álvarez 29'	Report	Vidal 44' (pen.)	Stadium: Sun Life Stadium
	Penalties
	Guarín (penalty missed); Ranocchia (penalty scored); Álvarez (penalty scored); Icardi (penalty scored); Belfodil (penalty scored); Andreolli (penalty scored); Pereira (penalty scored); Jonathan (penalty scored); Juan Jesus (penalty scored)		(penalty missed) Giovinco; (penalty scored) Marchisio; (penalty scored) Llorente; (penalty scored) Pirlo; (penalty scored) Ogbonna; (penalty scored) Cáceres; (penalty scored) Chiellini; (penalty scored) De Ceglie; (penalty missed) Isla

11 August 2013 Friendly	Juventus	4–1	Juventus Primavera	Villar Perosa
17:00 CEST (UTC+02:00)	Vidal; Bonucci; Tevez; Quagliarella		Josipovic	Stadium: Campo sportivo comunale "Gaetano Scirea"

== Competitions ==
=== Supercoppa Italiana ===
18 August 2013	Juventus	4–0	Lazio	Rome
21:00 CEST (UTC+02:00)	Pogba 23'; Barzagli (yellow card) 43'; Chiellini 52'; Lichtsteiner 54'; Tevez 56'		Hernanes (yellow card) 31'; Dias (yellow card) 59'	Stadium: Stadio Olimpico; Attendance: 57,000; Referee: Gianluca Rocchi

=== Serie A ===
==== League table ====
Pos	Team	Pld	W	D	L	GF	GA	GD	Pts	Qualification or relegation
1	Juventus (C)	38	33	3	2	80	23	+57	102	Qualification for the Champions League group stage
2	Roma	38	26	7	5	72	25	+47	85	Qualification for the Champions League group stage
3	Napoli	38	23	9	6	77	39	+38	78	Qualification for the Champions League play-off round
4	Fiorentina	38	19	8	11	65	44	+21	65	Qualification for the Europa League group stage (Note: Since the 2013–14 Coppa Italia champions Napoli and runners–up Fiorentina qualified for the 2014–15 European football season thus 4th, 5th and 6th in Serie A (barring any failure to receive a "UEFA licence" from the FIGC or a ban from European competition) would qualify for group stage, play-off round and third qualifying round respectively.)
5	Internazionale	38	15	15	8	62	39	+23	60	Qualification for the Europa League play-off round

Source: Serie A, Soccerway
Rules for classification: 1st points; 2nd head-to-head points; 3rd head-to-head goal difference; 4th goal difference; 5th number of goals scored; 6th public draw.
(Head-to-head record is applied for clubs with the same number of points only once all matches between said clubs have been played)
(C) Champions

==== Results summary ====
Overall								Home						Away					
Pld	W	D	L	GF	GA	GD	Pts	W	D	L	GF	GA	GD	W	D	L	GF	GA	GD
38	33	3	2	80	23	+57	102	19	0	0	47	9	+38	14	3	2	33	14	+19

Last updated: 18 May 2014.
Source: Competitive matches

==== Results by round ====
Round	1	2	3	4	5	6	7	8	9	10	11	12	13	14	15	16	17	18	19	20	21	22	23	24	25	26	27	28	29	30	31	32	33	34	35	36	37	38
Ground	A	H	A	H	A	A	H	A	H	H	A	H	A	H	A	H	A	H	A	H	A	H	A	H	H	A	H	A	A	H	A	H	A	H	A	H	A	H
Result	W	W	D	W	W	W	W	L	W	W	W	W	W	W	W	W	W	W	W	W	D	W	D	W	W	W	W	W	W	W	L	W	W	W	W	W	W	W
Position	9	5	5	5	4	3	3	3	3	3	3	2	1	1	1	1	1	1	1	1	1	1	1	1	1	1	1	1	1	1	1	1	1	1	1	1	1	1

Updated to match(es) played on 18 May 2014. Source: Competitive matches
A = Away; H = Home; W = Win; D = Draw; L = Loss

==== Matches ====
24 August 2013 1	Sampdoria	0–1	Juventus	Genoa
20:45 CEST (UTC+02:00)	Eramo (yellow card) 51'; Gastaldello (yellow card) 60'; Castellini (red card) 90'	Report	Tevez 58'; Vidal (yellow card) 64'; Lichtsteiner (yellow card) 79'; Vučinić (yellow card) 81'	Stadium: Stadio Luigi Ferraris; Attendance: 29,277; Referee: Luca Banti

31 August 2013 2	Juventus	4–1	Lazio	Turin
20:45 CEST (UTC+02:00)	Vidal 14', 26'; Bonucci (yellow card) 39'; Vučinić 49'; Tevez 80'	Report	Klose 28'; Hernanes (yellow card) 38' (yellow-red card) 63'	Stadium: Juventus Stadium; Attendance: 38,041; Referee: Paolo Tagliavento

14 September 2013 3	Internazionale	1–1	Juventus	Milan
18:00 CEST (UTC+02:00)	Campagnaro (yellow card) 15'; Ranocchia (yellow card) 63'; Icardi 73'	Report	Lichtsteiner (yellow card) 17'; Vidal (yellow card) 62', (goal) 75'	Stadium: San Siro; Attendance: 75,343; Referee: Daniele Orsato

22 September 2013 4	Juventus	2–1	Hellas Verona	Turin
15:00 CEST (UTC+02:00)	Tevez 40'; Asamoah (yellow card) 41'; Llorente 45+3'; Ogbonna (yellow card) 49'; Vučinić (yellow card) 86'; Marchisio (yellow card) 88'	Report	Cacciatore 36'; Donadel (yellow card) 87'	Stadium: Juventus Stadium; Attendance: 40,888; Referee: Mauro Bergonzi

25 September 2013 5	Chievo	1–2	Juventus	Verona
20:45 CEST (UTC+02:00)	Dramé (yellow card) 23'; Théréau 28'; Sardo (yellow card) 50'; Bentivoglio (yellow card) 51'	Report	Quagliarella 47'; Bernardini 65' (o.g.)	Stadium: Stadio Marc'Antonio Bentegodi; Attendance: 20,000; Referee: Andrea De Marco

29 September 2013 6	Torino	0–1	Juventus	Turin
12:30 CEST (UTC+02:00)	Immobile (yellow card) 36'; Vives (yellow card) 77'; Moretti (yellow card) 82'	Report	Marchisio (yellow card) 19'; Pogba (yellow card) 25', (goal) 54'; Asamoah (yellow card) 60'	Stadium: Stadio Olimpico di Torino; Attendance: 18,982; Referee: Paolo Mazzoleni

6 October 2013 7	Juventus	3–2	Milan	Turin
20:45 CEST (UTC+02:00)	Pirlo 15'; Bonucci (yellow card) 23'; Giovinco 69'; Chiellini 75'	Report	Muntari 1', 90', (yellow card) 90+2'; De Jong (yellow card) 14'; Constant (yellow card) 17'; Mexès (yellow card) 69' (yellow-red card) 74'	Stadium: Juventus Stadium; Attendance: 39,594; Referee: Gianluca Rocchi

20 October 2013 8	Fiorentina	4–2	Juventus	Florence
15:00 CEST (UTC+02:00)	Aquilani (yellow card) 15'; Cuadrado (yellow card) 38'; Savić (yellow card) 57'; Rossi 66' (pen.), 76', 80'; Joaquín 78'	Report	Tevez (yellow card) 12', (goal) 37' (pen.); Barzagli (yellow card) 22'; Pogba 40'; Asamoah (yellow card) 65'; Pirlo (yellow card) 68'; Motta (yellow card) 87'; Bonucci (yellow card) 89'	Stadium: Stadio Artemio Franchi; Attendance: 38,290; Referee: Nicola Rizzoli

27 October 2013 9	Juventus	2–0	Genoa	Turin
15:00 CET (UTC+01:00)	Tevez (yellow card) 7', (goal) 36'; Vidal 23' (pen.)	Report	Fetfatzidis (yellow card) 56'	Stadium: Juventus Stadium; Attendance: 39,992; Referee: Daniele Doveri

30 October 2013 10	Juventus	4–0	Catania	Turin
20:45 CET (UTC+01:00)	Vidal 26'; Pirlo 34', (yellow card) 56'; Tevez 66'; Bonucci 71'; Chiellini (yellow card) 76'	Report	Guarente (yellow card) 53' (yellow-red card) 84'	Stadium: Juventus Stadium; Attendance: 37,604; Referee: Marco Guida

2 November 2013 11	Parma	0–1	Juventus	Parma
18:00 CET (UTC+01:00)	Mendes (yellow card) 34'; Gobbi (yellow card) 63'	Report	Marchisio (yellow card) 44'; Padoin (yellow card) 50'; Giovinco (yellow card) 53'; Pogba 77'; Llorente (yellow card) 80'	Stadium: Stadio Ennio Tardini; Attendance: 17,740; Referee: Domenico Celi

10 November 2013 12	Juventus	3–0	Napoli	Turin
20:45 CET (UTC+01:00)	Llorente 2'; Bonucci (yellow card) 51'; Ogbonna (yellow card) 57' (yellow-red card) 83'; Vidal (yellow card) 72'; Pirlo 74'; Pogba 80'	Report	Hamšík (yellow card) 61'	Stadium: Juventus Stadium; Attendance: 41,068; Referee: Gianluca Rocchi

24 November 2013 13	Livorno	0–2	Juventus	Livorno
15:00 CET (UTC+01:00)	Mbaye (yellow card) 39'; Siligardi (yellow card) 51'; Greco (yellow card) 53'; Luci (yellow card) 77'	Report	Llorente 63'; Asamoah (yellow card) 72'; Tevez 75'	Stadium: Stadio Armando Picchi; Attendance: 18,735; Referee: Davide Massa

1 December 2013 14	Juventus	1–0	Udinese	Turin
18:30 CET (UTC+01:00)	Llorente (yellow card) 45+1', (goal) 90+1'; Quagliarella (yellow card) 77'	Report	Heurtaux (yellow card) 42'	Stadium: Juventus Stadium; Attendance: 32,352; Referee: Gianpaolo Calvarese

6 December 2013 15	Bologna	0–2	Juventus	Bologna
20:45 CET (UTC+01:00)	Mantovani (yellow card) 32'	Report	Vidal 12'; Peluso (yellow card) 23'; Isla (yellow card) 40'; Chiellini (yellow card) 44', (goal) 89'; Marchisio (yellow card) 83'	Stadium: Stadio Renato Dall'Ara; Attendance: 30,490; Referee: Paolo Mazzoleni

15 December 2013 16	Juventus	4–0	Sassuolo	Turin
18:30 CET (UTC+01:00)	Tevez 15', 45', 68'; Peluso (yellow card) 18', (goal) 28'	Report	Magnanelli (yellow card) 11'	Stadium: Juventus Stadium; Attendance: 37,597; Referee: Mauro Bergonzi

22 December 2013 17	Atalanta	1–4	Juventus	Bergamo
15:00 CET (UTC+01:00)	Moralez 15'; Migliaccio (yellow card) 71'	Report	Tevez 6'; Pogba (yellow card) 26', (goal) 46'; Barzagli (yellow card) 65'; Llorente 75'; Vidal 79'	Stadium: Stadio Atleti Azzurri d'Italia; Attendance: 20,140; Referee: Domenico Celi

5 January 2014 18	Juventus	3–0	Roma	Turin
20:45 CET (UTC+01:00)	Vidal 17'; Tevez (yellow card) 33'; Chiellini (yellow card) 34'; Bonucci 48'; Vučinić 77' (pen.); Barzagli (yellow card) 87'	Report	Gervinho (yellow card) 37'; De Rossi (red card) 75'; Castán (red card) 76'; Ljajić (yellow card) 83'	Stadium: Juventus Stadium; Attendance: 41,365; Referee: Nicola Rizzoli

12 January 2014 19	Cagliari	1–4	Juventus	Cagliari
15:00 CET (UTC+01:00)	Pinilla 21', (red card) 87'; Cossu (yellow card) 55'; Dessena (yellow card) 80'	Report	Cáceres (yellow card) 22'; Llorente 31', 76'; Marchisio 73'; Lichtsteiner 80'	Stadium: Stadio Sant'Elia; Attendance: 4,798; Referee: Marco Guida

18 January 2014 20	Juventus	4–2	Sampdoria	Turin
20:45 CET (UTC+01:00)	Vidal 18', 41' (pen.); Llorente 24'; Chiellini (yellow card) 29'; Pogba 78'	Report	Barzagli 38' (o.g.); Regini (yellow card) 41'; Wszołek (yellow card) 51'; Gabbiadini 69'; Gastaldello (yellow card) 75'	Stadium: Juventus Stadium; Attendance: 39,588; Referee: Andrea Gervasoni

25 January 2014 21	Lazio	1–1	Juventus	Rome
20:45 CET (UTC+01:00)	Candreva 24' (pen.); Biava (yellow card) 58'	Report	Buffon (red card) 21'; Llorente 60'; Bonucci (yellow card) 79'	Stadium: Stadio Olimpico; Attendance: 44,018; Referee: Davide Massa

2 February 2014 22	Juventus	3–1	Internazionale	Turin
20:45 CET (UTC+01:00)	Lichtsteiner 15'; Chiellini 47'; Vidal 55'; Pogba (yellow card) 59'	Report	Kuzmanović (yellow card) 13'; Rolando 71'; Álvarez (yellow card) 73'	Stadium: Juventus Stadium; Attendance: 39,995; Referee: Gianluca Rocchi

9 February 2014 23	Hellas Verona	2–2	Juventus	Verona
15:00 CET (UTC+01:00)	Toni 52'; Marques (yellow card) 83'; Hallfreðsson (yellow card) 90+1'; Juanito 90+4'	Report	Tevez 4', 21'	Stadium: Stadio Marc'Antonio Bentegodi; Attendance: 25,140; Referee: Daniele Doveri

16 February 2014 24	Juventus	3–1	Chievo	Turin
15:00 CET (UTC+01:00)	Pirlo (yellow card) 14'; Asamoah 17'; Llorente (yellow card) 23', (goal) 58'; Marchisio 29'	Report	Guana (yellow card) 3'; Frey (yellow card) 28'; Cáceres 51' (o.g.)	Stadium: Juventus Stadium; Attendance: 39,228; Referee: Paolo Valeri

23 February 2014 25	Juventus	1–0	Torino	Turin
18:30 CET (UTC+01:00)	Vidal (yellow card) 13'; Tevez 30'; Bonucci (yellow card) 63'	Report	Pasquale (yellow card) 25'; El Kaddouri (yellow card) 80'	Stadium: Juventus Stadium; Attendance: 40,292; Referee: Nicola Rizzoli

2 March 2014 26	Milan	0–2	Juventus	Milan
20:45 CET (UTC+01:00)	Bonera (yellow card) 83'	Report	Llorente 44'; Marchisio (yellow card) 58'; Pirlo (yellow card) 64'; Tevez 68'	Stadium: San Siro; Attendance: 75,589; Referee: Marco Guida

9 March 2014 27	Juventus	1–0	Fiorentina	Turin
12:30 CET (UTC+01:00)	Vidal (yellow card) 12'; Asamoah 42', (yellow card) 90+1'	Report	Matos (yellow card) 81'; Savić (yellow card) 85'; Aquilani (yellow card) 87'; Gonzalo (yellow card) 90+3'	Stadium: Juventus Stadium; Attendance: 39,967; Referee: Daniele Orsato

16 March 2014 28	Genoa	0–1	Juventus	Genoa
20:45 CET (UTC+01:00)	De Maio (yellow card) 12'; Sturaro (yellow card) 22'; Sculli (yellow card) 26'; Gilardino (yellow card) 28'	Report	Vidal (yellow card) 50'; Pogba (yellow card) 60'; Pirlo 89'	Stadium: Stadio Luigi Ferraris; Attendance: 23,832; Referee: Paolo Mazzoleni

23 March 2014 29	Catania	0–1	Juventus	Catania
20:45 CET (UTC+01:00)	Gyömbér (yellow card) 3'; Bergessio (yellow card) 8' (yellow-red card) 67'; Rolín (yellow card) 87'	Report	Osvaldo (yellow card) 15'; Tevez 59'	Stadium: Stadio Angelo Massimino; Attendance: 19,945; Referee: Antonio Damato

26 March 2014 30	Juventus	2–1	Parma	Turin
20:45 CET (UTC+01:00)	Tevez 25', 32', (yellow card) 73'; Asamoah (yellow card) 31'; Vidal (yellow card) 45'	Report	Obi (yellow card) 11'; Molinaro 62'; Amauri (red card) 65'; Cassani (yellow card) 76'; Acquah (yellow card) 85'	Stadium: Juventus Stadium; Attendance: 38,785; Referee: Luca Banti

30 March 2014 31	Napoli	2–0	Juventus	Naples
20:45 CEST (UTC+02:00)	Inler (yellow card) 35'; Callejón 37'; Henrique (yellow card) 63'; Mertens 81'	Report	Lichtsteiner (yellow card) 54'; Bonucci (yellow card) 58'; Vidal (yellow card) 90+3'	Stadium: Stadio San Paolo; Attendance: 46,134; Referee: Daniele Orsato

7 April 2014 32	Juventus	2–0	Livorno	Turin
19:00 CEST (UTC+02:00)	Llorente 32', 35'	Report	Castellini (yellow card) 28'	Stadium: Juventus Stadium; Attendance: 39,284; Referee: Andrea Gervasoni

14 April 2014 33	Udinese	0–2	Juventus	Udine
20:45 CEST (UTC+02:00)	Heurtaux (yellow card) 60'	Report	Giovinco 16'; Bonucci (yellow card) 18'; Llorente 26'; Ogbonna (yellow card) 54'; Lichtsteiner (yellow card) 75'	Stadium: Stadio Friuli; Attendance: 22,262; Referee: Nicola Rizzoli
Note: Leonardo Bonucci was cautioned for dissent while a substitute.

19 April 2014 34	Juventus	1–0	Bologna	Turin
18:30 CEST (UTC+02:00)	Pogba 64'	Report	Antonsson (yellow card) 53'; Friberg (yellow card) 74'	Stadium: Juventus Stadium; Attendance: 39,798; Referee: Piero Giacomelli

28 April 2014 35	Sassuolo	1–3	Juventus	Reggio Emilia
20:45 CEST (UTC+02:00)	Zaza 9', (yellow card) 66'	Report	Tevez 34'; Marchisio 58'; Ogbonna (yellow card) 65'; Llorente 76'	Stadium: Mapei Stadium – Città del Tricolore; Attendance: 21,500; Referee: Antonio Damato

5 May 2014 36	Juventus	1–0	Atalanta	Turin
21:00 CEST (UTC+02:00)	Padoin 72'	Report	Estigarribia (yellow card) 71'	Stadium: Juventus Stadium; Attendance: 38,892; Referee: Andrea De Marco

11 May 2014 37	Roma	0–1	Juventus	Rome
17:45 CEST (UTC+02:00)	Destro (yellow card) 47'; Pjanić (yellow card) 59'; Totti (yellow card) 87'; Torosidis (yellow card) 90'	Report	Chiellini (yellow card) 22'; Osvaldo 90+4'	Stadium: Stadio Olimpico; Attendance: 54,097; Referee: Carmine Russo

18 May 2014 38	Juventus	3–0	Cagliari	Turin
15:00 CEST (UTC+02:00)	Silvestri 8' (o.g.); Llorente 15'; Marchisio 40'	Report		Stadium: Juventus Stadium; Attendance: 39,334; Referee: Mauro Bergonzi

=== Coppa Italia ===
Juventus started the Coppa Italia directly in the round of 16, as one of the eight best seeded teams.

18 December 2013 Round of 16	Juventus	3–0	Avellino	Turin
21:00 CET (UTC+01:00)	Giovinco 7'; Cáceres 16'; Quagliarella 35'; Bouy (yellow card) 81'			Stadium: Juventus Stadium; Attendance: 17,716; Referee: Massimiliano Irrati

21 January 2014 Quarter-finals	Roma	1–0	Juventus	Rome
20:45 CET (UTC+01:00)	Benatia (yellow card) 14'; Florenzi (yellow card) 29'; Castán (yellow card) 65'; Gervinho 79'		Peluso (yellow card) 75'; Vidal (yellow card) 90+4'	Stadium: Stadio Olimpico; Attendance: 56,557; Referee: Paolo Tagliavento

=== UEFA Champions League ===
==== Group stage ====
Pos	Team	Pld	W	D	L	GF	GA	GD	Pts	Qualification	RMA	GAL	JUV	CPH
1	(Spain) Real Madrid	6	5	1	0	20	5	+15	16	Advance to knockout phase	—	4–1	2–1	4–0
2	(Turkey) Galatasaray	6	2	1	3	8	14	−6	7	Advance to knockout phase	1–6	—	1–0	3–1
3	(Italy) Juventus	6	1	3	2	9	9	0	6	Transfer to Europa League	2–2	2–2	—	3–1
4	(Denmark) Copenhagen	6	1	1	4	4	13	−9	4		0–2	1–0	1–1	—

Source: UEFA

17 September 2013 1	Copenhagen (Denmark)	1–1	(Italy) Juventus	Copenhagen, Denmark
20:45 CEST (UTC+02:00)	Jørgensen 14'; Mellberg (yellow card) 45'; Bengtsson (yellow card) 49'	Report	Peluso (yellow card) 49'; Lichtsteiner (yellow card) 49'; Quagliarella 54'; Vidal (yellow card) 90+1'	Stadium: Parken Stadium; Attendance: 36,524; Referee: Ivan Bebek (Croatia)

2 October 2013 2	Juventus (Italy)	2–2	(Turkey) Galatasaray	Turin, Italy
20:45 CEST (UTC+02:00)	Vidal 78' (pen.); Quagliarella 87'	Report	Drogba 36'; Muslera (yellow card) 71'; Zan (yellow card) 80'; Bulut 88'	Stadium: Juventus Stadium; Attendance: 36,330; Referee: Viktor Kassai (Hungary)

23 October 2013 3	Real Madrid (Spain)	2–1	(Italy) Juventus	Madrid, Spain
20:45 CEST (UTC+02:00)	Ronaldo 4', 29' (pen.); Illarramendi (yellow card) 19'; Modrić (yellow card) 78'; Ramos (yellow card) 89'	Report	Llorente 22'; Vidal (yellow card) 28'; Chiellini (red card) 48'; Cáceres (yellow card) 78'	Stadium: Santiago Bernabéu; Attendance: 77,856; Referee: Manuel Gräfe (Germany)

5 November 2013 4	Juventus (Italy)	2–2	(Spain) Real Madrid	Turin, Italy
20:45 CET (UTC+01:00)	Vidal 42' (pen.); Pirlo (yellow card) 44'; Llorente 65'; Bonucci (yellow card) 72'	Report	Modrić (yellow card) 35'; Varane (yellow card) 41'; Ronaldo 52'; Bale 60'	Stadium: Juventus Stadium; Attendance: 40,696; Referee: Howard Webb (England)

27 November 2013 5	Juventus (Italy)	3–1	(Denmark) Copenhagen	Turin, Italy
20:45 CET (UTC+01:00)	Vidal 29' (pen.), 61' (pen.), 63'	Report	Jacobsen (yellow card) 28'; Sigurðsson (yellow card) 33'; Mellberg 56', (yellow card) 60'	Stadium: Juventus Stadium; Attendance: 39,506; Referee: Jonas Eriksson (Sweden)

11 December 2013 6	Galatasaray (Turkey)	1–0	(Italy) Juventus	Istanbul, Turkey
14:00 CET (UTC+01:00)	Sneijder (yellow card) 77', (goal) 85'; Bulut (yellow card) 89'; Muslera (yellow card) 90+2'	Report	Marchisio (yellow card) 18'; Tevez (yellow card) 59'	Stadium: Türk Telekom Arena; Attendance: 37,375; Referee: Pedro Proença (Portugal)
Note: The match was initially scheduled on 10 December but play was suspended in the 31st minute because of heavy snow.

=== UEFA Europa League ===
==== Knockout phase ====
===== Round of 32 =====
20 February 2014 First leg	Juventus (Italy)	2–0	(Turkey) Trabzonspor	Turin, Italy
19:00 CET (UTC+01:00)	Osvaldo 16'; Pogba 90+4'	Report	Zokora (yellow card) 74'; Yumlu (yellow card) 90+5'	Stadium: Juventus Stadium; Attendance: 35,436; Referee: Aleksei Kulbakov (Belarus)

27 February 2014 Second leg	Trabzonspor (Turkey)	0–2 (0–4 agg.)	(Italy) Juventus	Trabzon, Turkey
21:05 CET (UTC+01:00)		Report	Vidal 18'; Osvaldo 33'	Stadium: Hüseyin Avni Aker Stadium; Attendance: 24,169; Referee: Pavel Královec (Czech Republic)

===== Round of 16 =====
13 March 2014 First leg	Juventus (Italy)	1–1	(Italy) Fiorentina	Turin, Italy
21:05 CET (UTC+01:00)	Vidal 3'	Report	Pizarro (yellow card) 55'; Gonzalo (yellow card) 57'; Gómez 79'	Stadium: Juventus Stadium; Attendance: 39,610; Referee: Björn Kuipers (Netherlands)

20 March 2014 Second leg	Fiorentina (Italy)	0–1 (1–2 agg.)	(Italy) Juventus	Florence, Italy
19:00 CET (UTC+01:00)	Gonzalo (yellow card) 31' (yellow-red card) 69'; Cuadrado (yellow card) 55'; Neto (yellow card) 90+4'	Report	Vidal (yellow card) 50'; Pirlo 71'; Tevez (yellow card) 90+4'	Stadium: Stadio Artemio Franchi; Attendance: 32,633; Referee: Howard Webb (England)

===== Quarter-finals =====
3 April 2014 First leg	Lyon (France)	0–1	(Italy) Juventus	Lyon, France
21:05 CEST (UTC+02:00)	Tolisso (yellow card) 42'; Lopes (yellow card) 68'	Report	Giovinco (yellow card) 68'; Bonucci 85'; Vučinić (yellow card) 90+2'	Stadium: Stade de Gerland; Attendance: 37,084; Referee: Willie Collum (Scotland)

10 April 2014 Second leg	Juventus (Italy)	2–1 (3–1 agg.)	(France) Lyon	Turin, Italy
21:05 CEST (UTC+02:00)	Pirlo 4'; Bonucci (yellow card) 46'; Umtiti 68' (o.g.); Marchisio (yellow card) 80'	Report	Briand 18'; Umtiti (yellow card) 84'; Gonalons (yellow card) 89'	Stadium: Juventus Stadium; Attendance: 40,710; Referee: Alberto Undiano Mallenco (Spain)

===== Semi-finals =====
24 April 2014 First leg	Benfica (Portugal)	2–1	(Italy) Juventus	Lisbon, Portugal
21:05 CEST (UTC+02:00)	Garay 3'; Gomes (yellow card) 34'; Artur (yellow card) 71'; Lima 84'; Almeida (yellow card) 88'	Report	Pogba (yellow card) 45'; Tevez 73'	Stadium: Estádio da Luz; Attendance: 55,779; Referee: Cüneyt Çakır (Turkey)

1 May 2014 Second leg	Juventus (Italy)	0–0 (1–2 agg.)	(Portugal) Benfica	Turin, Italy
21:05 CEST (UTC+02:00)	Asamoah (yellow card) 64'; Vučinić (red card) 89'	Report	Rodrigo (yellow card) 56'; Pérez (yellow card) 61' (yellow-red card) 67'; Oblak (yellow card) 82'; Marković (red card) 89'; Salvio (yellow card) 90+6'	Stadium: Juventus Stadium; Attendance: 40,134; Referee: Mark Clattenburg (England)
Note: Mirko Vučinić and Lazar Marković were sent off for dissent while substitutes.

== Statistics ==
=== Appearances and goals ===
No.	Pos	Nat	Player	Total		Serie A		Supercoppa Italiana		Coppa Italia		Europe	
No.	Pos	Nat	Player	Apps	Goals	Apps	Goals	Apps	Goals	Apps	Goals	Apps	Goals
Goalkeepers
1	GK	(Italy) ITA	Gianluigi Buffon	48	0	33	0	1	0	0	0	14	0
30	GK	(Italy) ITA	Marco Storari	8	0	5+1	0	0	0	2	0	0	0
34	GK	(Brazil) BRA	Rubinho	1	0	0+1	0	0	0	0	0	0	0
Defenders
3	DF	(Italy) ITA	Giorgio Chiellini	44	4	31	3	1	1	1	0	11	0
4	DF	(Uruguay) URU	Martín Cáceres	30	1	14+3	0	0+1	0	1	1	11	0
5	DF	(Italy) ITA	Angelo Ogbonna	25	0	14+2	0	0+1	0	1+1	0	5+1	0
13	DF	(Italy) ITA	Federico Peluso	14	1	4+5	1	0	0	2	0	3	0
15	DF	(Italy) ITA	Andrea Barzagli	34	0	27	0	1	0	1	0	4+1	0
19	DF	(Italy) ITA	Leonardo Bonucci	44	3	28+1	2	1	0	1	0	12+1	1
26	DF	(Switzerland) SUI	Stephan Lichtsteiner	36	3	24+3	2	1	1	0+1	0	5+2	0
Midfielders
6	MF	(France) FRA	Paul Pogba	51	9	33+3	7	0+1	1	0	0	12+2	1
7	MF	(Italy) ITA	Simone Pepe	3	0	0+2	0	0	0	0+1	0	0	0
8	MF	(Italy) ITA	Claudio Marchisio	43	4	21+8	4	1	0	2	0	9+2	0
20	MF	(Italy) ITA	Simone Padoin	25	1	8+13	1	0	0	1	0	1+2	0
21	MF	(Italy) ITA	Andrea Pirlo	45	6	29+1	4	1	0	1	0	12+1	2
22	MF	(Ghana) GHA	Kwadwo Asamoah	47	2	32+2	2	1	0	1	0	10+1	0
23	MF	(Chile) CHI	Arturo Vidal	46	18	28+4	11	1	0	1	0	11+1	7
24	MF	(Netherlands) NED	Ouasim Bouy	1	0	0	0	0	0	0+1	0	0	0
33	MF	(Chile) CHI	Mauricio Isla	27	0	10+8	0	0	0	1	0	6+2	0
Forwards
9	FW	(Montenegro) MNE	Mirko Vučinić	18	2	4+8	2	1	0	0	0	3+2	0
10	FW	(Argentina) ARG	Carlos Tevez	48	21	30+4	19	1	1	0+1	0	12	1
12	FW	(Italy) ITA	Sebastian Giovinco	30	3	6+11	2	0	0	2	1	2+9	0
14	FW	(Spain) ESP	Fernando Llorente	45	18	29+5	16	0	0	0+1	0	6+4	2
18	FW	(Italy) ITA	Dani Osvaldo	18	3	4+7	1	0	0	0	0	4+3	2
27	FW	(Italy) ITA	Fabio Quagliarella	23	4	3+14	1	0	0	2	1	1+3	2
Players transferred out during the season
11	DF	(Italy) ITA	Paolo De Ceglie	6	0	2+2	0	0	0	1	0	0+1	0
16	DF	(Italy) ITA	Marco Motta	3	0	0+2	0	0	0	1	0	0	0

Last updated: 18 May 2014
Source: Competitions

=== Goalscorers ===
Rank	No.	Pos	Nat	Name	Serie A	Supercoppa	Coppa Italia	UEFA CL	UEFA EL	Total
1	10	FW	(Argentina)	Carlos Tevez	19	1	0	0	1	21
2	14	FW	(Spain)	Fernando Llorente	16	0	0	2	0	18
2	23	MF	(Chile)	Arturo Vidal	11	0	0	5	2	18
4	6	MF	(France)	Paul Pogba	7	1	0	0	1	9
5	21	MF	(Italy)	Andrea Pirlo	4	0	0	0	2	6
6	3	DF	(Italy)	Giorgio Chiellini	3	1	0	0	0	4
6	8	MF	(Italy)	Claudio Marchisio	4	0	0	0	0	4
6	27	FW	(Italy)	Fabio Quagliarella	1	0	1	2	0	4
9	12	FW	(Italy)	Sebastian Giovinco	2	0	1	0	0	3
9	18	FW	(Italy)	Dani Osvaldo	1	0	0	0	2	3
9	19	DF	(Italy)	Leonardo Bonucci	2	0	0	0	1	3
9	26	DF	(Switzerland)	Stephan Lichtsteiner	2	1	0	0	0	3
13	9	FW	(Montenegro)	Mirko Vučinić	2	0	0	0	0	2
13	22	MF	(Ghana)	Kwadwo Asamoah	2	0	0	0	0	2
15	4	DF	(Uruguay)	Martín Cáceres	0	0	1	0	0	1
15	13	DF	(Italy)	Federico Peluso	1	0	0	0	0	1
15	20	MF	(Italy)	Simone Padoin	1	0	0	0	0	1
Own goal					2	0	0	0	1	3
Totals					80	4	3	9	10	106

Last updated: 18 May 2014

=== Disciplinary record ===
Rank	Pos.	No.	Nat	Name	Serie A		Supercoppa		Coppa Italia		UEFA CL		UEFA EL		Total	
Rank	Pos.	No.	Nat	Name	Booked	Sent off (straight red)	Booked	Sent off (straight red)	Booked	Sent off (straight red)	Booked	Sent off (straight red)	Booked	Sent off (straight red)	Booked	Sent off (straight red)
1	MF	23	(Chile)	Arturo Vidal	8	0	0	0	1	0	2	0	1	0	12	0
2	DF	19	(Italy)	Leonardo Bonucci	8	0	0	0	0	0	1	0	1	0	10	0
3	MF	8	(Italy)	Claudio Marchisio	5	0	0	0	0	0	1	0	1	0	7	0
3	MF	22	(Ghana)	Kwadwo Asamoah	6	0	0	0	0	0	0	0	1	0	7	0
4	DF	3	(Italy)	Giorgio Chiellini	5	0	0	0	0	0	0	1	0	0	5	1
4	DF	5	(Italy)	Angelo Ogbonna	5	1	0	0	0	0	0	0	0	0	5	1
4	FW	10	(Argentina)	Carlos Tevez	4	0	0	0	0	0	1	0	1	0	6	0
5	MF	6	(France)	Paul Pogba	4	0	0	0	0	0	0	0	1	0	5	0
5	MF	21	(Italy)	Andrea Pirlo	4	0	0	0	0	0	1	0	0	0	5	0
5	DF	26	(Switzerland)	Stephan Lichtsteiner	4	0	0	0	0	0	1	0	0	0	5	0
6	FW	9	(Montenegro)	Mirko Vučinić	2	0	0	0	0	0	0	0	1	1	3	1
6	DF	13	(Italy)	Federico Peluso	2	0	0	0	1	0	1	0	0	0	4	0
6	DF	15	(Italy)	Andrea Barzagli	3	0	1	0	0	0	0	0	0	0	4	0
7	FW	12	(Italy)	Sebastian Giovinco	2	0	0	0	0	0	0	0	1	0	3	0
7	FW	14	(Spain)	Fernando Llorente	3	0	0	0	0	0	0	0	0	0	3	0
8	DF	4	(Uruguay)	Martín Cáceres	1	0	0	0	0	0	1	0	0	0	2	0
9	GK	1	(Italy)	Gianluigi Buffon	0	1	0	0	0	0	0	0	0	0	0	1
9	DF	16	(Italy)	Marco Motta	1	0	0	0	0	0	0	0	0	0	1	0
9	FW	18	(Italy)	Dani Osvaldo	1	0	0	0	0	0	0	0	0	0	1	0
9	MF	20	(Italy)	Simone Padoin	1	0	0	0	0	0	0	0	0	0	1	0
9	MF	24	(Netherlands)	Ouasim Bouy	0	0	0	0	1	0	0	0	0	0	1	0
9	FW	27	(Italy)	Fabio Quagliarella	1	0	0	0	0	0	0	0	0	0	1	0
9	MF	33	(Chile)	Mauricio Isla	1	0	0	0	0	0	0	0	0	0	1	0
Totals					71	2	1	0	3	0	9	1	8	1	91	4

Last updated: 18 May 2014
