= Federico Peluso =

Italian footballer (born 1984)

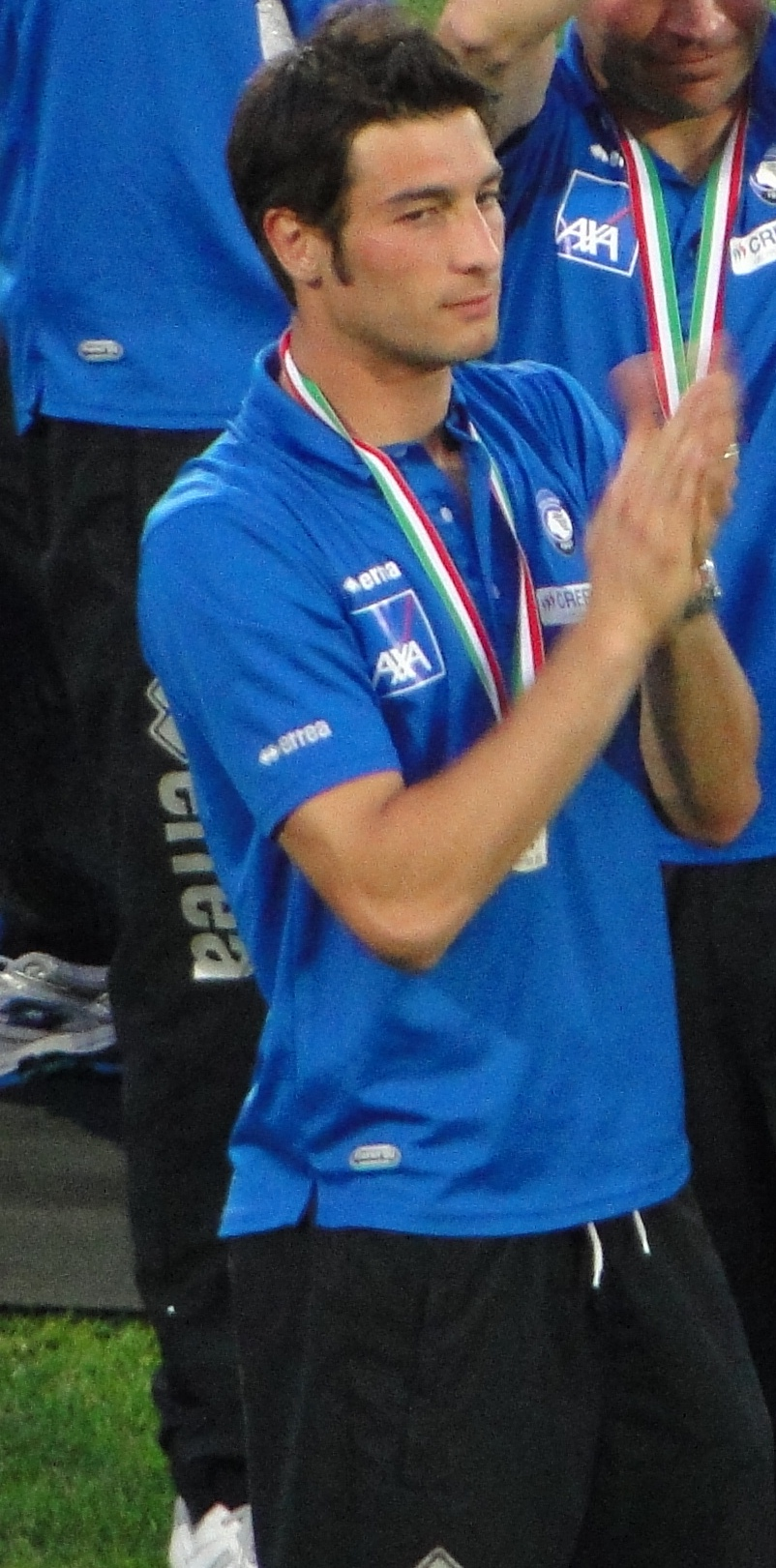
- Peluso with Atalanta in 2012

Personal information
- Date of birth: 20 January 1984 (age 42)
- Place of birth: Rome, Italy
- Height: 1.88 m (6 ft 2 in)
- Position: Left back

Team information
- Current team: Monza (technical assistant)

Youth career
- Petriana
- –2001: Lazio

Senior career*
| Years | Team | Apps | (Gls) |
| 2001–2004 | Pro Vercelli | 43 | (1) |
| 2004–2006 | Ternana | 66 | (1) |
| 2006–2009 | AlbinoLeffe | 57 | (4) |
| 2009–2013 | Atalanta | 111 | (4) |
| 2013–2014 | Juventus | 21 | (1) |
| 2014–2022 | Sassuolo | 175 | (4) |
| Total | | 466 | (15) |

International career
| 2005 | Italy U21 Serie B | 3 | (0) |
| 2012 | Italy | 3 | (1) |

Managerial career
- 2022–: Monza (technical assistant)
- * Club domestic league appearances and goals

Federico Peluso (Italian pronunciation: [fedeˈriːko peˈluːzo]; born 20 January 1984) is an Italian professional football coach and former player who is a technical assistant for Serie A club Monza. He played as a left back for various Serie A clubs and the Italy national team.

== Club career ==
Peluso began his youth career at Petriana, in Rome. He later moved to Lazio, but was subsequently released.

In 2001, he joined Pro Vercelli, where he played three full seasons. In 2004 summer he joined Ternana, and after two years in the club, he was bought from AlbinoLeffe, being promoted with the Bergamo club. However, in his second season, he had a fallout with the club's ownership, and was removed from squad. In January 2009, Peluso joined Atalanta, as an exchange for Karamoko Cissé.

On 8 March 2009, Peluso made his Serie A debut, playing against AC Milan. On 25 October, he made his first top flight goal, against Parma.

On 3 January 2013, Peluso joined Juventus on a six-month loan, with a view to a permanent transfer after the period. He spent the second half of the 2012–13 campaign on loan with the Bianconeri, and his performances earned him a permanent transfer and a contract until June 2017, as Juventus captured the league title. In June 2013, Juventus announced that they had completed the signing of Federico Peluso from Atalanta for a transfer fee of €4.8 million. After the end of the 2013–14 season, Serie A side Sassuolo announced that they acquired Peluso outright, as part of the deal that brought Luca Marrone back to Juventus.

== International career ==
On 10 August 2012, after his impressive performances on Atalanta, Peluso (alongside teammates Andrea Consigli, Manolo Gabbiadini and Ezequiel Schelotto) was called from manager Cesare Prandelli to the Italy national squad. Five days later, he made his debut, in a friendly loss against England. On 11 September, he scored his first international goal, in a 2–0 home win in a World Cup qualifier against Malta.

== Managerial career ==
On 17 October 2022, Peluso was appointed technical assistant of newly promoted Serie A side Monza.

== Career statistics ==
=== Club ===
As of match played 23 May 2021

| Team | Season | League | | | Cup^{1} | | Europe^{2} | | Total | |
| Team | Season | Division | Apps | Goals | Apps | Goals | Apps | Goals | Apps | Goals |
|---|---|---|---|---|---|---|---|---|---|---|
| Pro Vercelli | 2001–02 | Serie C2 | 1 | 0 | 0 | 0 | — | | 1 | 0 |
| Pro Vercelli | 2002–03 | Serie C2 | 17 | 1 | 0 | 0 | — | | 17 | 1 |
| Pro Vercelli | 2003–04 | Serie C2 | 27 | 0 | 0 | 0 | — | | 27 | 0 |
| Pro Vercelli | Total | | 45 | 1 | 0 | 0 | 0 | 0 | 45 | 1 |
| Ternana | 2004–05 | Serie B | 35 | 0 | 4 | 0 | — | | 39 | 0 |
| Ternana | 2005–06 | Serie B | 31 | 1 | 2 | 0 | — | | 31 | 1 |
| Ternana | Total | | 66 | 1 | 6 | 0 | 0 | 0 | 72 | 1 |
| AlbinoLeffe | 2006–07 | Serie B | 21 | 1 | 0 | 0 | — | | 21 | 1 |
| AlbinoLeffe | 2007–08 | Serie B | 40 | 4 | 1 | 0 | — | | 41 | 4 |
| AlbinoLeffe | 2008–09 | Serie B | 0 | 0 | 0 | 0 | — | | 0 | 0 |
| AlbinoLeffe | Total | | 61 | 5 | 1 | 0 | 0 | 0 | 62 | 5 |
| Atalanta | 2008–09 | Serie A | 8 | 0 | 0 | 0 | — | | 8 | 0 |
| Atalanta | 2009–10 | Serie A | 24 | 1 | 1 | 0 | — | | 25 | 1 |
| Atalanta | 2010–11 | Serie B | 33 | 1 | 2 | 0 | — | | 35 | 1 |
| Atalanta | 2011–12 | Serie A | 33 | 1 | 1 | 0 | — | | 34 | 1 |
| Atalanta | 2012–13 | Serie A | 13 | 1 | 0 | 0 | — | | 13 | 1 |
| Atalanta | Total | | 111 | 4 | 4 | 0 | 0 | 0 | 115 | 4 |
| Juventus | 2012–13 | Serie A | 12 | 0 | 2 | 1 | 3 | 0 | 17 | 1 |
| Juventus | 2013–14 | Serie A | 9 | 1 | 2 | 0 | 3 | 0 | 14 | 1 |
| Juventus | Total | | 21 | 1 | 4 | 1 | 6 | 0 | 31 | 2 |
| Sassuolo | 2014–15 | Serie A | 28 | 0 | 1 | 0 | 0 | 0 | 29 | 0 |
| Sassuolo | 2015–16 | Serie A | 34 | 1 | 2 | 0 | — | | 36 | 1 |
| Sassuolo | 2016–17 | Serie A | 34 | 1 | 0 | 0 | 7 | 0 | 41 | 1 |
| Sassuolo | 2017–18 | Serie A | 31 | 1 | 2 | 0 | — | | 33 | 1 |
| Sassuolo | 2018–19 | Serie A | 16 | 1 | 2 | 0 | — | | 18 | 1 |
| Sassuolo | 2019–20 | Serie A | 23 | 0 | 1 | 0 | — | | 24 | 0 |
| Sassuolo | 2020–21 | Serie A | 7 | 0 | 1 | 0 | — | | 8 | 0 |
| Sassuolo | Total | | 173 | 4 | 9 | 0 | 7 | 0 | 189 | 4 |
| Career total | | | 477 | 16 | 24 | 1 | 13 | 0 | 514 | 17 |

^{1}Includes Coppa Italia and Coppa Italia Serie C.

^{2}Includes UEFA Champions League.

== International ==
As of 11 September 2012

| National team | Year | Apps | Goals |
|---|---|---|---|
| Italy | 2012 | 3 | 1 |
| Italy | Total | 3 | 1 |

As of match played 11 September 2012. Scores and results list Italy's goal tally first.

| # | Date | Venue | Opponent | Score | Result | Competition |
|---|---|---|---|---|---|---|
| 1. | 11 September 2012 | Stadio Alberto Braglia, Modena, Italy | Malta | 2–0 | 2–0 | 2014 FIFA World Cup qualification |

== Honours ==
Atalanta

- Serie B: 2010–11

Juventus

- Serie A: 2012–13, 2013–14
- Supercoppa Italiana: 2013
