= Paul Pogba =

French footballer (born 1993)

- Pogba in 2025

Personal information
- Full name: Paul Labile Pogba
- Date of birth: 15 March 1993 (age 33)
- Place of birth: Lagny-sur-Marne, Seine-et-Marne, France
- Height: 1.91 m (6 ft 3 in)
- Position: Midfielder

Youth career
- 1999–2006: Roissy-en-Brie
- 2006–2007: Torcy
- 2007–2009: Le Havre
- 2009–2011: Manchester United

Senior career*
Years	Team	Apps	(Gls)
2011–2012	Manchester United	3	(0)
2012–2016	Juventus	124	(28)
2016–2022	Manchester United	154	(29)
2022–2024	Juventus	8	(0)
2025–2026	Monaco	6	(0)

International career
2008–2009	France U16	17	(1)
2010	France U17	10	(2)
2010–2011	France U18	6	(1)
2011–2012	France U19	12	(4)
2012–2013	France U20	13	(4)
2013–2022	France	91	(11)
Medal record
Men's football
Representing France
FIFA World Cup
Winner	2018 Russia
UEFA Nations League
Winner	2021 Italy
UEFA European Championship
Runner-up	2016 France
FIFA U-20 World Cup
Winner	2013 Turkey
- * Club domestic league appearances and goals as of 18:30, 2 May 2026 (UTC)

Paul Labile Pogba (born 15 March 1993) is a French professional footballer who plays as a central midfielder. He is currently a free agent. Regarded as one of the best midfielders of his generation, he is known for his passing, vision, physicality, shooting, and dribbling.

Pogba began his professional career at Manchester United, playing several games in the 2011–12 season. However, limited appearances caused him to join Italian club Juventus on a free transfer in 2012, where he soon developed into one of the best midfielders in Europe. Pogba was a focal part to the club winning four consecutive Serie A titles and two Coppa Italia titles, which included domestic doubles in 2014–15 and 2015–16. Pogba was named in the UEFA Team of the Year and in the FIFA FIFPro World11 after helping Juventus reach the 2015 UEFA Champions League final, their first in twelve years.

During his time at Juventus, Pogba was often linked with fellow elite-level clubs; he returned to Manchester United in 2016 for a then-world record transfer fee of €105 million (£89.3 million). In his first season back, he won the EFL Cup and the UEFA Europa League, being awarded the Europa League Player of the Season. In the following season, he helped United finish as both Premier League and FA Cup runners-up. In the 2018–19 season, he had the most prolific season of his career and was named in the PFA Team of the Year. Despite United's overall decline during the period, Pogba remained the team's focal point in his first three seasons. He rejoined Juventus in 2022, but was released by the club in 2024 after beginning an 18-month doping ban that was lifted in March 2025. In June 2025, he signed for Monaco.

Internationally, Pogba captained France to victory at the 2013 FIFA U-20 World Cup and was named the Best Player of the tournament. He debuted for the senior team a year later and went on to become a central figure of his French generation. Pogba played at the 2014 FIFA World Cup, where he was named the Best Young Player. At UEFA Euro 2016, which was on home soil, he helped his country reach the final, though they ultimately suffered a shock defeat. He was part of the country's redemption as they won the 2018 World Cup, scoring in the final.

== Early life ==
Paul Labile Pogba was born on 15 March 1993 in Lagny-sur-Marne, Seine-et-Marne, France, to Guinean parents. He has two older brothers who are twins – Florentin Pogba and Mathias Pogba – born in Guinea, who are also footballers and play for the Guinean national team. Florentin last played as a defender for ATK Mohun Bagan while Mathias last played as a forward for ASM Belfort. As a child, Pogba was a fan of Arsenal.

== Club career ==
=== Early career ===
Pogba began his football career at the age of six playing for US Roissy-en-Brie, a few miles south of his hometown. He spent seven seasons at the club before joining US Torcy, where he served as captain of the club's under-13 team.

After one season with Torcy, Pogba joined professional club Le Havre. In his second season at the club, Pogba captained its under-16 team to the final phase of its domestic league, the Championnat National des 16 ans. Le Havre finished second to Lens in the final group phase, finishing ahead of the likes of Lyon and Nancy. Pogba also established himself as a youth international for his country.

=== Manchester United ===
==== Transfer ====
On 31 July 2009, Pogba announced that he was departing Le Havre to join the youth academy of Manchester United in England. The move surprised his parent club, as it allegedly had a "non-solicitation agreement" with Pogba, which was agreed to by not only the player but also his parents in 2006. The agreement, which was in place until the end of the 2009–10 season, allowed Le Havre to sign Pogba to an aspirant (youth) contract once the player met specific age and scholarship requirements. On 1 August, Le Havre released an official statement on its website criticising Manchester United and the Pogba family. Le Havre also announced its intent to ask FIFA to probe the situation.

In response to Le Havre's accusations, Manchester United threatened to sue the club, while Pogba denied he was leaving Le Havre for monetary reasons, which Le Havre President Jean-Pierre Louvel had alleged to be £87,000 and a house. Le Havre was also accused by Pogba's former club Torcy of using the same tactics it purported Manchester United to have used when the club acquired Pogba from its youth academy. On the same day of Pogba's announcement to depart for England, Torcy released a press release on its official website criticising Le Havre's accusations, stating, "We will not use the term 'steal,' but the recruiters of Le Havre acted the same way with the club in Torcy." The club cited Le Havre's acceptance of allowing Pogba to sign an amateur licence with the club without notifying Torcy as its primary reason why. On 7 October, Manchester United were cleared of wrongdoing by a judge appointed by FIFA, with the declaration that Pogba was not contractually linked to Le Havre. Despite having the option to appeal, on 18 June 2010, Le Havre officials confirmed that the club had reached an agreement with Manchester United for the transfer of Pogba. The terms of the agreement were confidential.

==== Academy and call-up to first team ====
Pogba completed his transfer to Manchester United on 7 October 2009 and made his debut with the club's under-18 team on 10 October against Crewe Alexandra in a 2–1 defeat. He finished the 2009–10 under-18 campaign with seven goals in 21 appearances. The team finished first in their group, but lost to Arsenal 5–3 on penalties in the play-off semi-finals. In April 2010, Pogba was a part of the under-18 team that successfully defended their title at the Torneo Calcio Memorial Claudio Sassi-Sassuolo in Bologna, Italy. In the 2010–11 season, Pogba remained on the club's academy team in the Premier Academy League and played with the team during the first three months of the season. In November 2010, he was called up to the club's reserve team and made his debut on 2 November 2010 in a 3–1 win over Bolton Wanderers. On 10 January 2011, in the FA Youth Cup, Pogba scored a long-range goal, described as a "piledriver," in the team's 3–2 victory over Portsmouth. The win allowed the team to progress to the fourth round of the competition. A month later, Pogba scored a similar goal in a 3–2 defeat to West Bromwich Albion in the Academy League.

On 19 February 2011, Pogba was one of four academy players promoted to the first-team squad by manager Alex Ferguson ahead of Manchester United's FA Cup fifth round match against Crawley Town, for which he was assigned the number 42 shirt. He continued in the under-18s for the rest of the season, helping the team to a lengthy run in the FA Youth Cup; in the semi-final encounter against Chelsea in the competition, Pogba scored a goal in the first leg, a 3–2 defeat, and provided the assist for the opening goal of the second leg, a 4–0 win. In the final, Manchester United defeated Sheffield United 6–3 on aggregate to win their tenth Youth Cup title; Pogba started and played the entire match in both legs.

==== 2011–12 season ====
Ahead of the start of the 2011–12 season, Ferguson confirmed that Pogba would feature with the senior team during the season, stating, "I mean if we hold Pogba back, what's going to happen? He's going to leave. You know, in a couple of years' time when his contract is going to finish. So we have to give him the opportunity to see how he can do in the first-team and he's got great ability." Pogba was promoted to the club's reserve team permanently for the 2011–12 season and made his first appearance of the season on 15 August 2011 in the team's opening Premier Reserve League match against Arsenal. On 25 August, in the team's second league match against Swansea City reserves, Pogba scored the second goal in a 6–0 rout. On 19 September, Ferguson announced Pogba would play in their Football League Cup tie against Leeds United the following day; Pogba appeared as a half-time substitute to make his professional debut as Manchester United won the match 3–0. Pogba made his second appearance against Aldershot Town in the Fourth Round of the League Cup on 25 October 2011.

Pogba made his Premier League debut against Stoke City on 31 January 2012, replacing Javier Hernández in the 72nd minute. He made another substitute appearance against West Bromwich Albion on 11 March. Four days later, he made his European debut in the second leg of the team's UEFA Europa League round of 16 tie against Spanish club Athletic Bilbao; he appeared as a substitute in the 2–1 away defeat, coming on for Michael Carrick in the 63rd minute as Manchester United lost the tie 5–3 on aggregate.

=== Juventus ===
==== 2012–13 season ====
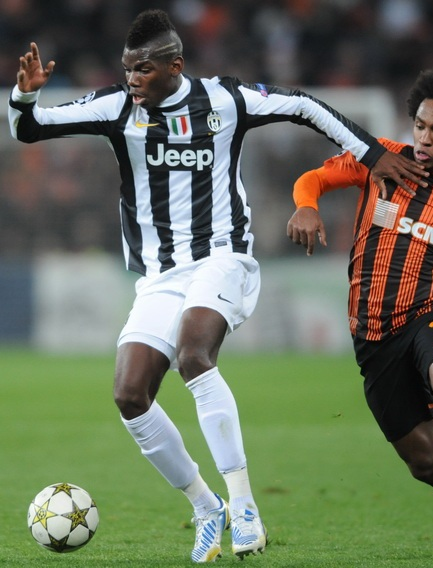
Pogba playing for Juventus in a UEFA Champions League match in 2012

On 3 July 2012, Manchester United manager Alex Ferguson confirmed that Pogba had left the club after not signing a new contract. Ferguson stated that Pogba had signed for Serie A club Juventus "a long time ago as far as we're aware." Ferguson also accused Pogba of disrespecting Manchester United, saying, "It is disappointing. I don't think he showed us any respect at all, to be honest. I'm quite happy that if they [footballers] carry on that way, they're probably better doing it away from us." On 27 July, Juventus confirmed on their official website that Pogba had undergone a medical at the club, and the transfer was completed on 3 August, when he signed a four-year contract. He made his first appearance for Juventus in a pre-season friendly against Benfica in Geneva on 1 August, coming on as a 78th-minute substitute for Andrea Pirlo.

Pogba's first competitive appearance with Juventus came in the Serie A match against Chievo on 22 September 2012, where he played the full 90 minutes. On 2 October, Pogba made his first appearance in the UEFA Champions League in a 1–1 home draw against Shakhtar Donetsk, and on 20 October, Pogba scored his first goal for the club in a 2–0 win over Napoli. On 31 October, he started against Bologna and scored the game-winning goal in a 2–1 victory. Pogba also contributed to the opening goal scored by Fabio Quagliarella. The midfielder was subsequently praised for his performance in the match by several Italian media outlets such as la Repubblica, Il Messaggero and La Gazzetta dello Sport.

On 5 May 2013, Pogba was sent off in Juventus' Scudetto-clinching game for spitting towards an opponent after being slapped in the face.

==== 2013–14 season ====
On 18 August 2013, Pogba was a key protagonist of Juventus' 4–0 win over Lazio, the match that won Juventus the 2013 Italian Supercoppa. During the match, Pogba replaced Claudio Marchisio and scored the first goal of the game; he was elected Man of the Match. In December, Pogba was named 2013's Golden Boy for the best young player in Europe.

In January 2014, Pogba was named by The Guardian as one of the ten most promising young players in Europe. On 20 February, Pogba scored his first goal in UEFA club competitions as Juventus defeated Trabzonspor 2–0 at home in the first leg of the round of 32 of the 2013–14 UEFA Europa League. On 14 April, Pogba produced an assist in Juventus's 2–0 win over Udinese, the same team that Pogba scored two magnificent goals against in the previous season. Later that week, Pogba scored the only goal in Juventus's 1–0 win over Bologna. Pogba was also named the man of the match for his performance.

Pogba would prove to be a key player for the club that season, breaking into the starting line-up, and making more appearances (51) for the club than any other player across all competitions that season, also scoring 9 goals. He finished the season with his second consecutive Serie A title under manager Antonio Conte, also reaching the semi-finals of the Europa League.

==== 2014–15 season ====
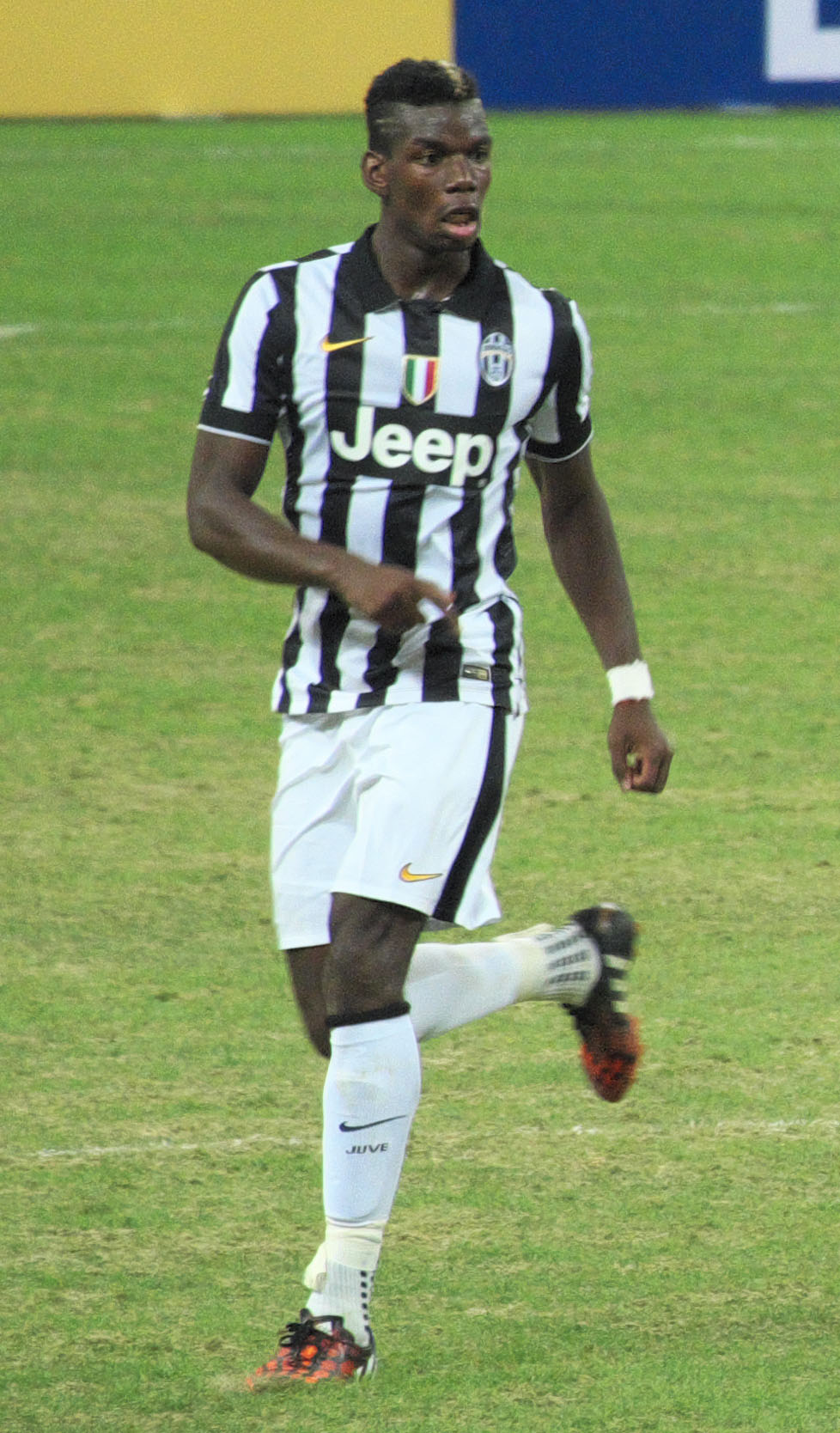
Pogba playing in a pre-season friendly in 2014

On 20 September 2014, under new Juventus manager Massimiliano Allegri, Pogba contributed to Juventus's away win against Milan by providing the assist for the only goal of the game, scored by Carlos Tevez. Later that month, on 18 October, Pogba saved Juventus from a defeat against Sassuolo by scoring a decisive equaliser; he was later named Man of the Match. On 24 October, Pogba renewed his contract with Juventus, tying him to the club until 2019. On 4 November, on his 100th appearance with the club, Pogba scored Juventus's third goal against Olympiacos in the Champions League, helping them to win the match; this was his first ever Champions League goal. On 22 November, he scored his first brace of the season in a 3–0 win against Lazio at the Stadio Olimpico in Rome.

On 28 October, Pogba was named as one of the 23 shortlisted candidates for the 2014 Ballon d'Or; at 21, he was the youngest on the list. In 2014, Pogba was awarded the Bravo Award, by the Italian sports magazine Il Guerin Sportivo, which is awarded to the best under-23 player who has participated in European competitions.

On 11 January 2015, Pogba helped Juventus secure their first win against Napoli at the Stadio San Paolo in 14 years as he scored a volley that helped Juventus beat Napoli 1–3. On 15 January, he scored his first goal in the Coppa Italia as Juventus defeated Verona 6–1 in the round of 16 of the tournament. On 9 March, Pogba scored the only goal in a 1–0 victory against Sassuolo to put Juventus 11 points clear of Roma at the top of the league table. In the second leg of Juventus's round of 16 tie against Borussia Dortmund, Pogba was taken off during the first half after injuring his hamstring and was later ruled out for two months.

Pogba returned to the starting line-up on 9 May, scoring in a 1–1 home draw against Cagliari, as Juventus celebrated winning their fourth consecutive Serie A title since 2012. On 13 May, Pogba set up Álvaro Morata's equaliser against Real Madrid in the second leg of the Champions League semi-final; the goal allowed Juventus win the tie 3–2 on aggregate to advance to the Champions League Final for the first time in 12 years. On 20 May, Pogba set up Juventus's first goal as they defeated Lazio 2–1 at the Stadio Olimpico in the 2015 Coppa Italia Final. On 6 June 2015, Pogba started for Juventus in the 2015 UEFA Champions League Final as the club were defeated 3–1 by Barcelona at Berlin's Olympiastadion.

==== 2015–16 season ====
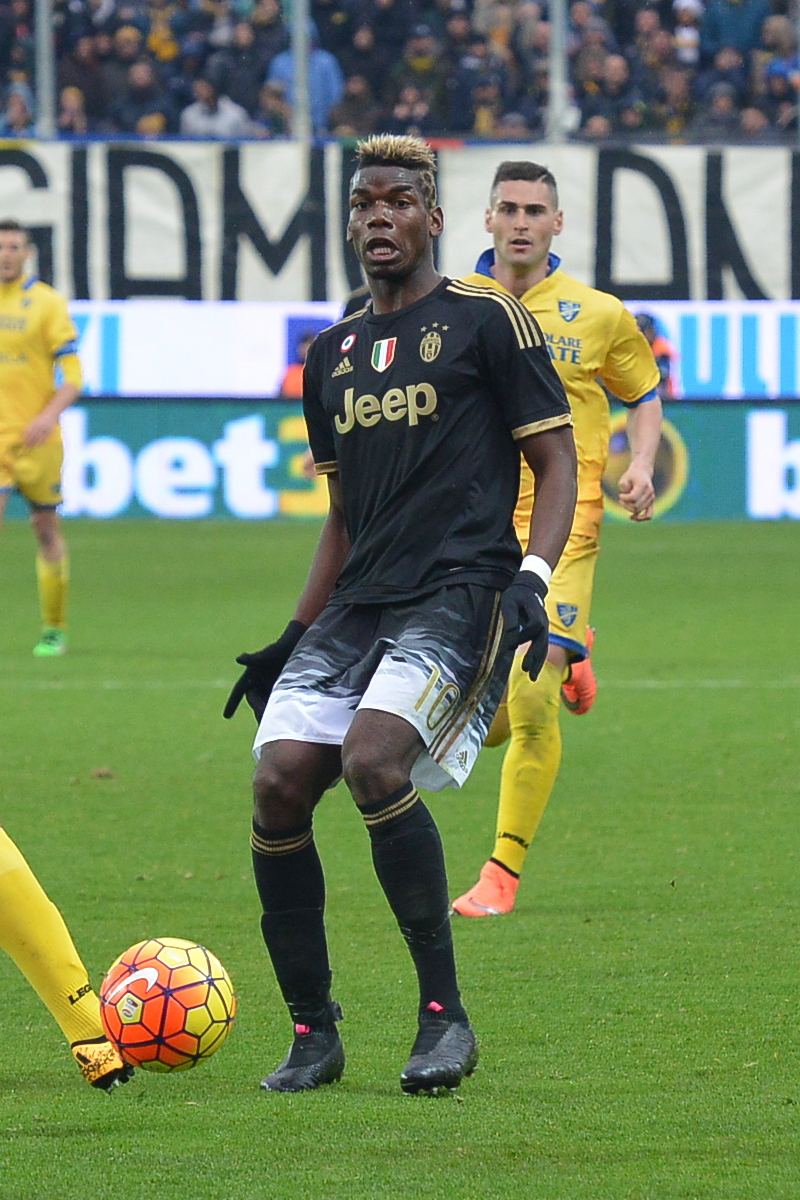
Pogba during a Serie A match against Frosinone in February 2016

On 15 July 2015, Pogba was part of a ten-man shortlist for the 2015 UEFA Best Player in Europe Award. For the 2015–16 season, he was awarded the prestigious number 10 shirt, following Carlos Tevez's departure, which had previously been worn by Alessandro Del Piero, Roberto Baggio and Michel Platini. On 8 August, he assisted a goal in Juventus's 2–0 win over Lazio in the 2015 Supercoppa Italiana. On 12 August, it was announced that he placed tenth in the 2015 UEFA Best Player in Europe Award. On 31 October, Pogba made his 100th Serie A appearance in a 2–1 home win over Torino in the Turin Derby, also scoring Juventus's opening goal from a half-volley from outside the area.

On 24 November, Pogba was nominated for the 2015 UEFA Team of the Year, later being announced as part of the team on 8 January 2016. Three days later he was named in the 2015 FIFA FIFPro World XI. Pogba excelled in his team's new creative position, which saw him gain more time on the ball, and played a key role in helping Juventus to the league title, scoring a joint personal best of 8 goals in Serie A, while also finishing the league season as the top assist provider in Serie A, with a personal record of 12 assists, alongside Miralem Pjanić.

=== Return to Manchester United ===
==== 2016–17 season ====
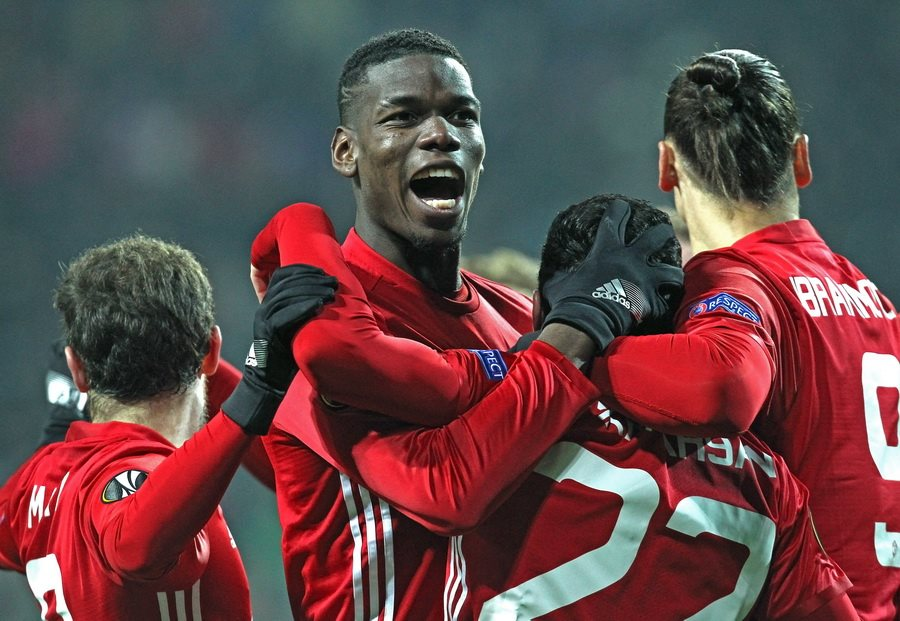
Pogba celebrating a goal with his Manchester United teammates during UEFA Europa League match against Zorya Lugansk in December 2016

On 8 August 2016, Pogba returned to former club, Manchester United, on a five-year contract for a then-record for highest football transfer fee at €105 million (£89.3 million) plus bonuses of €5 million, surpassing the former record holder Gareth Bale. Pogba's agent, Mino Raiola, received a reported €27 million from Juventus when he re-joined Manchester United; Juventus disclosed the fee as an auxiliary expense, for €26.154 million. The Football Association announced that Pogba would be suspended for Manchester United's opening Premier League fixture of the 2016–17 season against AFC Bournemouth, due to two yellow cards he had accumulated in the previous season's edition of the Coppa Italia with Juventus. On 19 August, he made his first appearance since returning to the club in a 2–0 home victory over Southampton in the Premier League.

After the 2–1 defeat at home in the first Manchester derby of the season on 10 September, Pogba was criticised for his lack of discipline in positioning by pundit Jamie Carragher. Pogba soon recovered to form and scored his first Premier League goal for United with a header against defending champions Leicester City in a 4–1 home win on 24 September. He then scored twice, once from the penalty spot and then with a strike from distance, in a Europa League tie against Fenerbahçe on 20 October. Manager José Mourinho defended Pogba after the game, criticising football's "Einsteins" for being too quick to judge the player.

In January 2017, Pogba scored in a 2–1 away defeat to Hull City in the second leg of the EFL Cup semi-final, which allowed Manchester United to advance to the final 3–2 on aggregate. On 24 May 2017, Pogba scored in the 18th minute of the Europa League final against Dutch club AFC Ajax, which proved to be the game-winning goal as Manchester United defeated Ajax 2–0 to win United's first continental trophy in nine years. Manchester United finished the 2016–17 Premier League season in sixth place, with Pogba being involved in 30 games, scoring five goals and providing four assists.

==== 2017–18 season ====
Pogba scored the fourth goal in a 4–0 victory over West Ham United on the opening weekend of the 2017–18 Premier League season. During a 3–0 defeat of Basel during the 2017–18 UEFA Champions League group stage, Pogba tore his left hamstring and was expected to miss eight matches. He returned to action on 18 November in a 4–1 win over Newcastle United, assisting Anthony Martial with a cross from the flank and scored United's third goal. In his first game of 2018, on 1 January, Pogba provided assists for both goals as Manchester United defeated Everton 2–0. Throughout the next few months, Pogba was again the subject of criticism regarding a lack of discipline and for not fulfilling his defensive duties. He was absent from several pivotal games in favour of Scott McTominay, including Manchester United's 2–1 victory over rivals Liverpool and was only used as a late substitution as his side were eliminated from the Champions League in the round of 16 by Sevilla in March.

The day before the Manchester derby, Manchester City manager Pep Guardiola claimed that Pogba's agent, Mino Raiola, had offered Pogba to play for his side, which Raiola denied. In the derby at Etihad Stadium on 7 April, Pogba scored two goals in quick succession as Manchester United came back to defeat their rivals 3–2 after conceding two goals in the first half. The victory also prevented Manchester City from securing the Premier League title against them, which they later did as Manchester United finished the season as runners-up. In the 2018 FA Cup Final against Chelsea, his side were defeated 1–0, with Pogba squandering a chance to equalise with a header in the penalty box.

==== 2018–19 season ====
Due to the absence of team captain Antonio Valencia, Pogba took over temporary captaincy of the club in the opening games of the 2018–19 season. Pogba began the season well in the first few weeks, scoring four goals as the new designated penalty taker. Following a series of disappointing results, Mourinho announced that Pogba would not captain the team again. In late September, Pogba and Mourinho were filmed having a confrontation during a training session, despite Mourinho's assertion that there was "no problem" between the two. Despite this, Pogba continued to play in the starting eleven and scored in United's 2–1 victory over Everton. Following a spell of poor form and strained relationship with Mourinho, Pogba found himself benched and linked with an exit from Manchester United during the January transfer season. Continuing tensions between Pogba and Mourinho saw him branded a "virus" who influenced United's bad form by the manager. Pogba continued to be benched throughout the next few games up to and including the match against Liverpool, which Manchester United lost 3–1. Shortly after this match Mourinho was sacked as Manchester United manager, and Ole Gunnar Solskjær was appointed as the caretaker manager one day later.

Under new manager Ole Gunnar Solskjær, Pogba saw a revival in his form as he scored twice consecutively against Huddersfield Town and Bournemouth. In January 2019, Pogba assisted Marcus Rashford's game-winning goal against Tottenham Hotspur, with consecutive goals in the following matches against Brighton & Hove Albion and Burnley. Pogba then scored a brace in a 3–0 away win over Fulham and was named man of the match; his two goals brought his seasonal tally to a personal best of 11 league goals and 13 in all competitions. Pogba continued this trend by scoring again in United's FA Cup fifth round tie against Chelsea where United won 2–0 and got an assist in a 3–1 win against Crystal Palace. Pogba's form dipped towards the end of the season as Manchester United only won 2 of their last 12 games of the season as they were knocked out of the FA cup by Wolverhampton Wanderers. Pogba was also criticised for his performance in the Champions League quarter final as Manchester United lost to Barcelona 4–0 on aggregate. In that poor run of games, Pogba did manage to score a brace in a 2–1 home win against West Ham. On the final day of the Premier League season, Pogba started for Manchester United as they lost to Cardiff City 2–0 at Old Trafford and after the game, Pogba was seen talking to some fans who were throwing him abuse. Despite the poor end to the season, Pogba had the most productive season of his career as he scored 16 goals and got 11 assists in all competition and was named in the PFA team of the year, despite his inconsistent form.

==== 2019–20 season ====
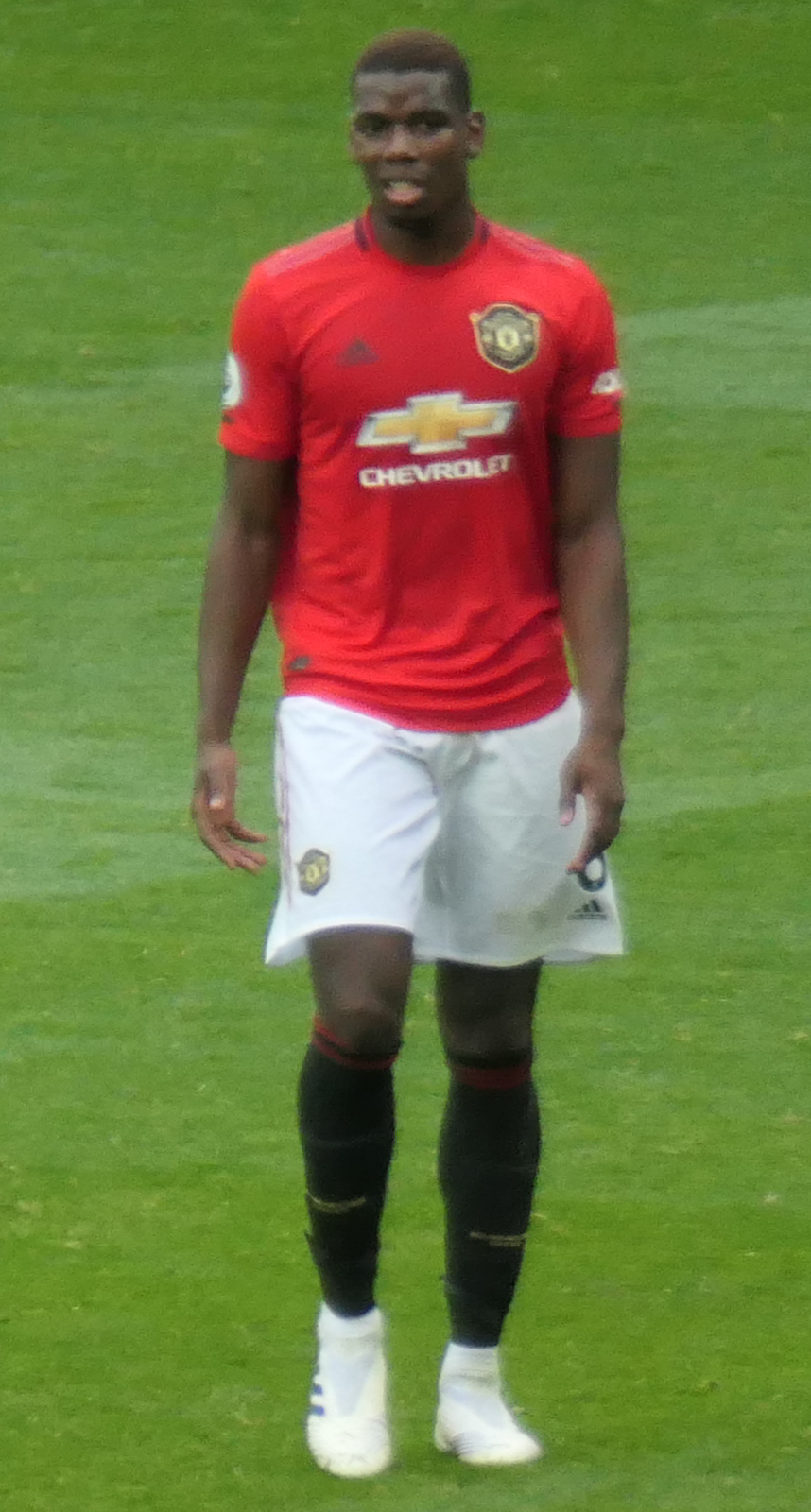
Pogba during a Premier League match in 2019

During the summer of 2019, Pogba hinted that his time at the club was coming to an end as he said "it could be a good time to have a new challenge somewhere else" with Real Madrid and Juventus being linked to the player. Despite the speculation of Pogba leaving, he participated in United's preseason. Towards the end of July, Manchester United rejected a £27.6 million plus James Rodríguez offer from Real Madrid for Paul Pogba as they felt the offer fell way below their evaluation of the player.

Pogba started for Manchester United in their opening game in the Premier League on 11 August 2019, providing two assists in the club's 4–0 home win over Chelsea. In a post-game interview, Pogba said even though he was a Manchester United player, a "question mark" remained over his future. Pogba suffered racist abuse on social media after missing a penalty during a 1–1 away draw against Wolverhampton Wanderers the following game.

On 31 August, Pogba suffered an ankle injury in a 1–1 draw against Southampton, putting him out of action for one month. His return to the squad was in a League Cup penalty shootout win over Rochdale. Pogba then featured in the following game, a 1–1 home draw against Arsenal, where he suffered a recurrence of his injury but also made his 100th appearance for the club. In late October it was announced that due to his injury, he would be out until December 2019, and his return was delayed by illness. Pogba made two appearances from the bench in late December against Watford and Newcastle United before suffering a second recurrence of his injury. In January 2020, Pogba underwent surgery on his ankle putting him out of action for a further four to eight weeks.

In May 2020, manager Ole Gunnar Solskjær announced that Pogba would be fit to play following the return to football during project restart. In United's first game of the restart, Pogba came on as a substitute and won a penalty which Bruno Fernandes converted, resulting in a 1–1 draw against Tottenham Hotspur. On 24 June, Pogba made his first start since September in a 3–0 crushing of Sheffield United.

On 9 July, Pogba scored his first goal of the season as United won 3–0 at Aston Villa.

==== 2020–21 season and 2021–22 season ====
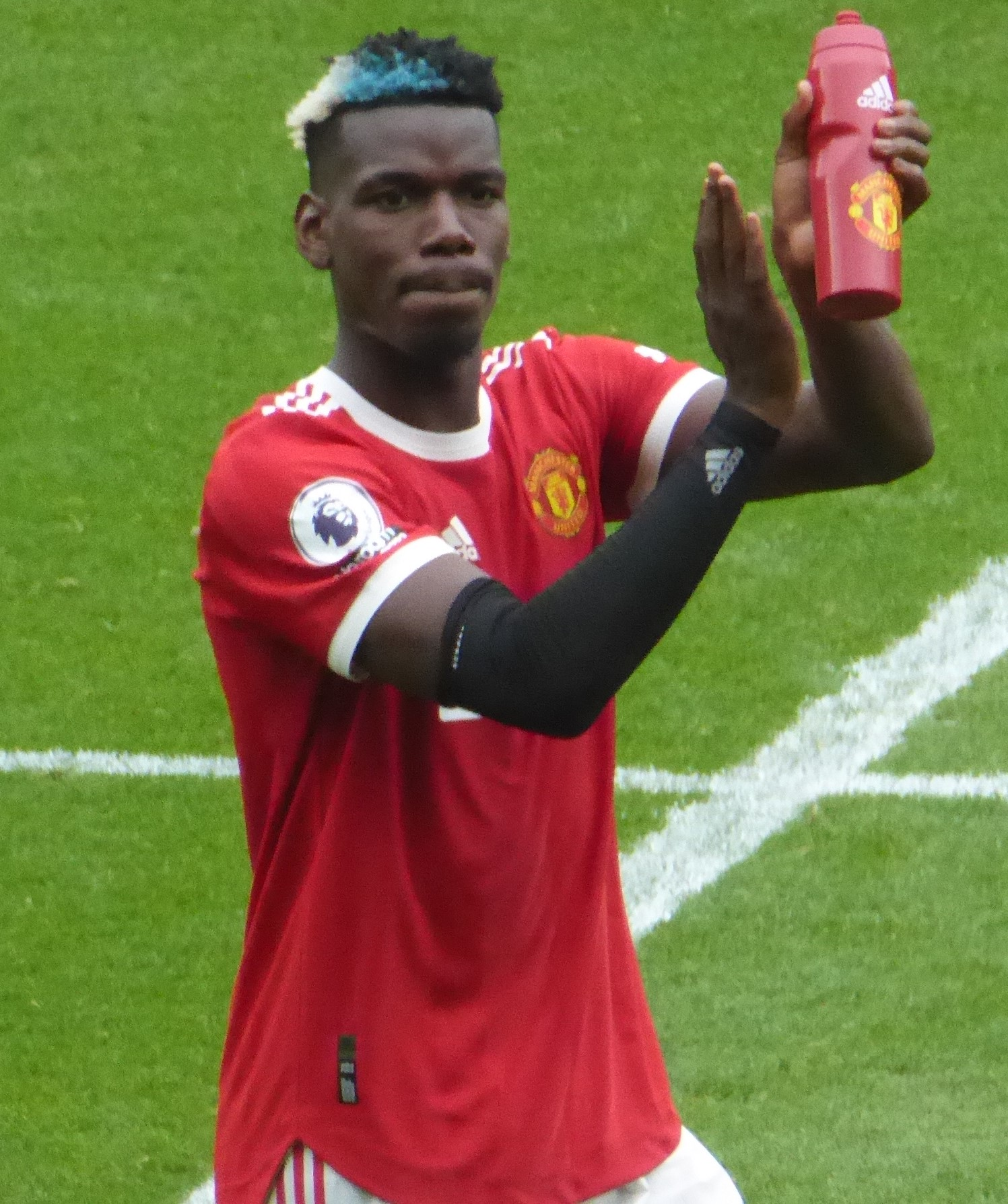
Pogba after a Premier League game in 2021

Pogba scored his first goal of the 2020–21 season against Brighton & Hove Albion in the fourth round of the EFL Cup on 30 September 2020, scoring from a deflected free kick to give United a 3–0 win. On 18 March 2021, he scored the winning goal in a 1–0 away win over Milan in the UEFA Europa League round of 16, to help his team to win 2–1 on aggregate and reach the quarter-finals.

In the opening match of the Premier League season on 14 August, Pogba provided four assists in a 5–1 victory over rivals Leeds United. In doing so, he became just the seventh player in Premier League history to register four assists in a single match, the first United player to achieve the feat, and eclipsed his entire assist tally of the previous season of three.

His only goal of the season came in a 1–1 draw with Burnley in the Premier League on 8 February 2022. On 1 June 2022, Manchester United announced that Pogba would leave the club following the expiration of his contract.

=== Return to Juventus: injuries and doping ban ===
On 11 July 2022, Juventus announced Pogba's return on a four-year contract. On 26 July, Pogba injured the meniscus in his knee, and was sidelined for two months. The injury later required surgery that ruled him out until at least after the 2022 FIFA World Cup. He eventually made his first appearance of the season, and his second debut for Juventus, as a substitute in a 4–2 win over Torino on 28 February 2023. On 9 March, he was dropped from the Juventus squad by manager Massimiliano Allegri for a Europa League match against Freiburg due to disciplinary reasons, as he had turned up late to a team dinner. Four days later, it was reported by the media that Pogba had suffered a muscle injury in training, and that he would be out of action for three weeks. On 14 May 2023, in a league match against Cremonese he received his first starting lineup nomination of the season. He had to be subbed off after only 23 minutes due to a muscle injury. Medical examinations later revealed a lesion in his left thigh, thus ruling him out for the remainder of the season. He only played a combined 161 minutes.

On 11 September 2023, Pogba was provisionally suspended from playing due to a failure of a drug test, as non-endogenous testosterone was found in his test results following a match against Udinese on 20 August. The drugs test was confirmed to be failed on 6 October 2023 after another sample was found to also have non-endogenous testosterone. On 29 February 2024, he received a four-year ban for doping from the Italian Anti-Doping National Tribunal, with the option to appeal to the Court of Arbitration for Sport. On 4 October, the ban was reduced to 18 months, which meant that he can begin training and begin playing from January 2025 and March 2025, respectively.

On 15 November 2024, Juventus announced that they had reached a mutual agreement with Pogba regarding the termination of his contract, starting from the following 30 November.

=== Monaco ===
On 28 June 2025, Pogba signed a contract with Monaco until 30 June 2027. Later that year, on 22 November, he made his debut for the club as a substitute in a 4–1 away defeat against Rennes, marking his first competitive appearance in 811 days. By mid-season, in January 2026, the assessment of his return was deemed disappointing by the club’s management. The midfielder had played only thirty minutes in total in Ligue 1 and had not participated in any Champions League matches. His last appearance dates back to December 5, 2025, during a 0–1 defeat against Brest, in which he played twenty-one minutes before suffering a new calf injury. ASM General Manager Thiago Scuro publicly admitted in January 2026 that "the plan put in place [...] is not working as expected," mentioning the possibility of reconsidering the player's future at the club the following summer. In February 2026, Pogba was omitted from AS Monaco's UEFA Champions League squad for the remainder of the season due to a persistent calf injury.

In August 2026, Pogba suffered another setback during pre-season after sustaining a left thigh injury in training with Monaco. The injury came shortly after he had returned to group training and had featured for 45 minutes in a pre-season friendly against Saint-Priest. Reports subsequently emerged that Monaco had decided to terminate his contract, despite his deal originally running until June 2027. The club had reportedly already been considering ending their relationship before the latest injury, with the player's recurring fitness problems limiting him to just six competitive appearances and 115 minutes during the 2025–26 season. On 19 August 2026, Monaco officially confirmed that Pogba and the club had mutually agreed to terminate his contract.

== International career ==
=== Youth ===
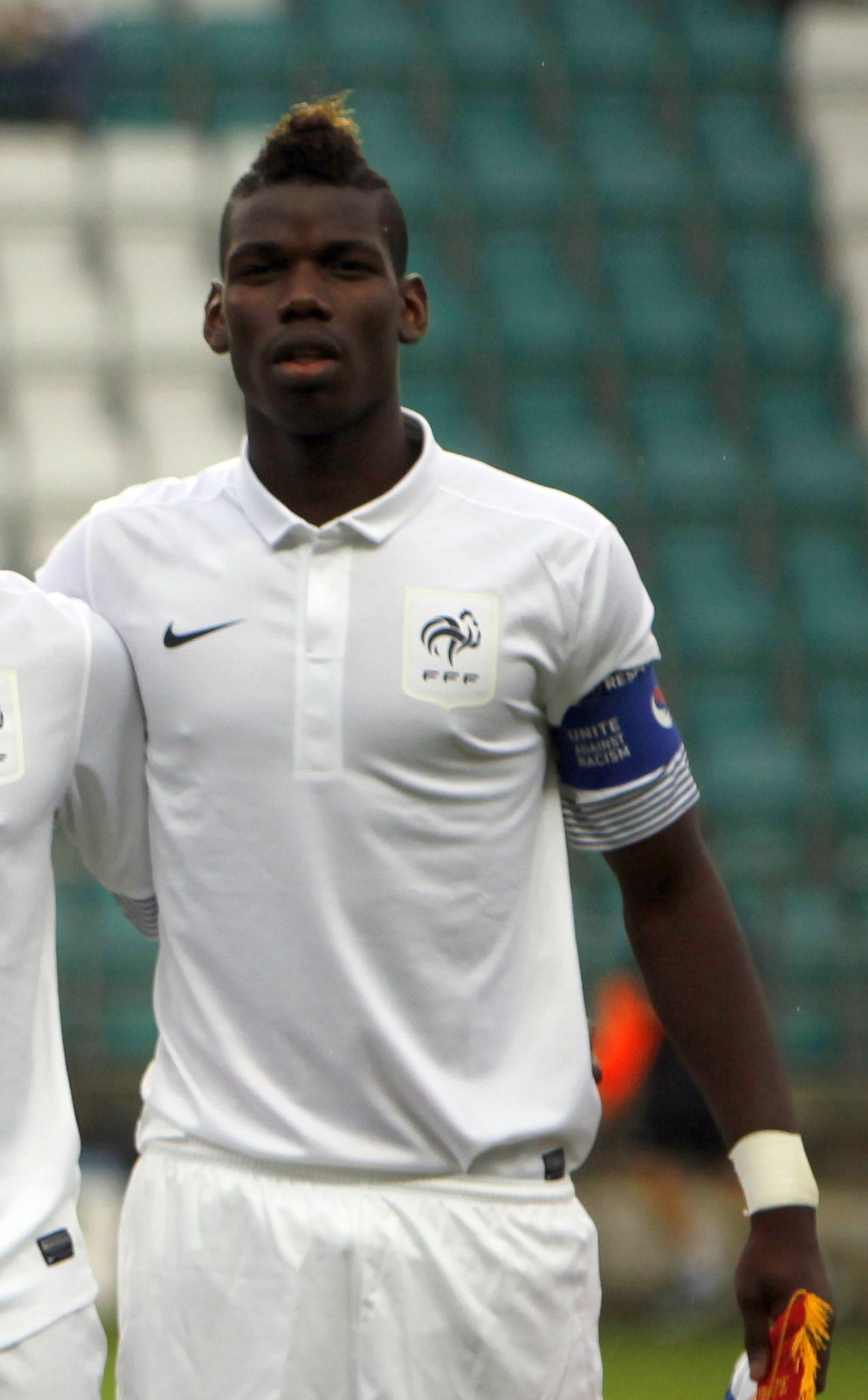
Pogba with the France national under-19 team at the 2012 UEFA European Under-19 Championship

Pogba began his international career for France with the national youth football team. Prior to his international debut, Pogba was named captain of the under-16 team by coach Guy Ferrier. He made his youth international debut on 23 September 2008 in the team's opening match of the campaign against Wales in Llanelli. France won the match 4–2. Under Pogba's leadership, the team recorded impressive victories over Uruguay and Italy in the Tournoi du Val-de-Marne and defeated the Republic of Ireland by an aggregate score of 8–2 over the course of two matches. On 31 January 2009, he scored his first youth international goal in the 2009 Aegean Cup Final against Norway. The goal gave France a 1–0 lead and the team won the match 2–1 to win the tournament.

He was a part of the team that played at the 2010 UEFA European Under-17 Championship scoring both of his goals with the team at the tournament. He scored the only goal in the team's 1–0 victory over Portugal in the group stage and netted his second in the team's 2–1 loss to England in the semi-finals. Following the departure of Ferrier as the team's youth international coach, Pogba was re-instated as captain at his age level by new coach Pierre Mankowski. Mankowski had previously been the assistant manager of the senior national team under the reign of Raymond Domenech. Pogba made his under-18 debut on 27 October 2010 at the Tournio de Limoges against Greece in a 4–1 victory. On 24 March 2011, Pogba scored his first goal with the team netting the game-winning goal in a 2–1 win over Germany. The goal was scored from over 30 metres (33 yd) out.

Pogba made his debut with the under-19 team in its first match of the season against Italy on 6 September 2011. In the match, he assisted on two goals, scored by Jean-Christophe Bahebeck and Anthony Koura, in a 3–1 victory. On 29 February 2012, he scored his first goal for the team in a 2–1 defeat to Spain. In Elite Round qualification for the 2012 UEFA European Under-19 Championship, Pogba scored the fifth goal in the team's 6–0 rout of the Netherlands. The victory qualified France for the competition. On 11 June 2012, Pogba was included in the squad to participate in the tournament. In the team's opening group stage match against Serbia, he converted a penalty in a 3–0 win. France reached the semi-finals where the team faced Spain. In the match, with France trailing 3–2 in extra time, Pogba scored the equalising goal three minutes prior to the match's completion to send it to penalties. Despite Pogba converting the opening penalty for France, Les Bleuets were defeated 4–2.

Due to the under-19 team's semi-final appearance in the 2012 UEFA European Under-19 Championship, the nation qualified for the 2013 FIFA U-20 World Cup, which merited under-20 team appearances for Pogba. Similar to the previous two seasons, Pogba was installed as captain by Mankowski and made his under-20 debut in a 0–0 draw against China. In the team's next match against North Korea, Pogba scored the team's second goal in a 3–1 win. Pogba was the captain of the team that won France's first ever FIFA U-20 World Cup. In that tournament held in Turkey, he played every minute of all of France's matches except for the final group match against Spain, in which he was an unused substitute. He was named the best player of the tournament.

=== Senior ===
==== Early career and 2014 World Cup ====
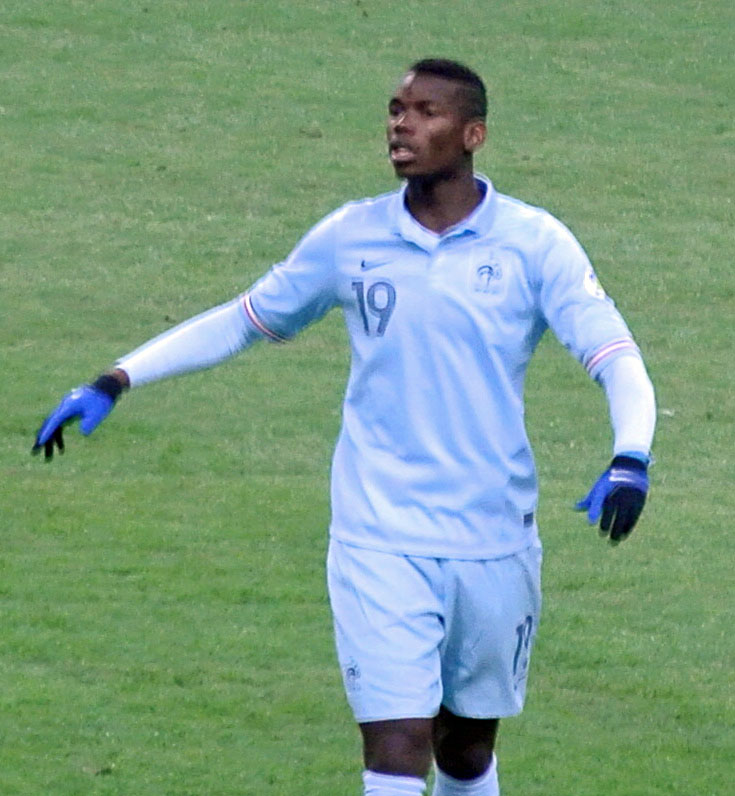
Pogba making his debut for the France national team in 2013

On 22 March 2013, Pogba made his debut for the French senior team in a 2014 World Cup qualifier against Georgia. He played the full 90 minutes in a 3–1 win. He scored his first international goal against Belarus on 10 September 2013 in a 4–2 victory, once again during a 2014 World Cup qualifier.

On 6 June 2014, Pogba was named in France's squad for the 2014 FIFA World Cup. Dubbed as 'France's secret weapon', El País hailed him as "the great hope of the French national team" ahead of the World Cup. On 15 June, he started in central midfield in the team's first World Cup fixture – a 3–0 victory over Honduras – suffering a foul from Wilson Palacios which led to a red card for the Honduran and a penalty kick, which was converted by Karim Benzema to give France the lead. He appeared as a substitute in the team's second match, assisting a goal for Benzema in a 5–2 victory of Switzerland. In the round of 16, Pogba scored a 79th minute opening goal and was named man of the match by FIFA as Les Bleus defeated Nigeria 2–0 in Brasília. France were eliminated in the quarter-finals of the competition following a 1–0 defeat to eventual champions Germany on 4 July with Pogba giving away the free kick from which the Germans eventually scored. On 13 July 2014, Pogba was named the tournament's Best Young Player.

==== Euro 2016 ====
In May 2016, Pogba was named by national side manager Didier Deschamps to France's 23-man squad for UEFA Euro 2016, to be played on home soil. Although much was expected of Pogba at the upcoming European Championships, in France's opening match of the tournament, a 2–1 win over Romania on 10 June, he endured criticism for his perceived negative performance after being played out of position and was subsequently left on the bench by Deschamps for his nation's second group match, later coming on as a second-half substitute in a 2–0 win over Albania. In the round of 16, he was once again the target of media scrutiny for conceding an early penalty against Ireland, prompting former England international Gary Lineker to post on Twitter: “Is Pogba the world's most overrated player?”; France eventually came from behind to win the match 2–1.

In the quarter-final match against Iceland on 3 July, at the Stade de France, Pogba was able to recapture his form, putting on a dominant performance in his new midfield role, as he scored his nation's second goal of the night from a header following Antoine Griezmann's corner, which he had previously helped to obtain; he later started the play which led to Griezmann's goal, as the host nation advanced to the semi-finals of the competition following a 5–2 win. In the semi-final match against Germany four days later, Pogba was once again started in a deep-lying midfield role alongside Blaise Matuidi in a 4–2–3–1 formation; following N'Golo Kanté's introduction in the second half, he was shifted to a more advanced role, which gave him more tactical freedom, and he subsequently helped to create Griezmann's second goal of the match, as the hosts defeated the reigning World Cup Champions 2–0 to advance to the final of the tournament, where they suffered a 1–0 extra-time defeat to Portugal.

==== 2018 World Cup victory ====
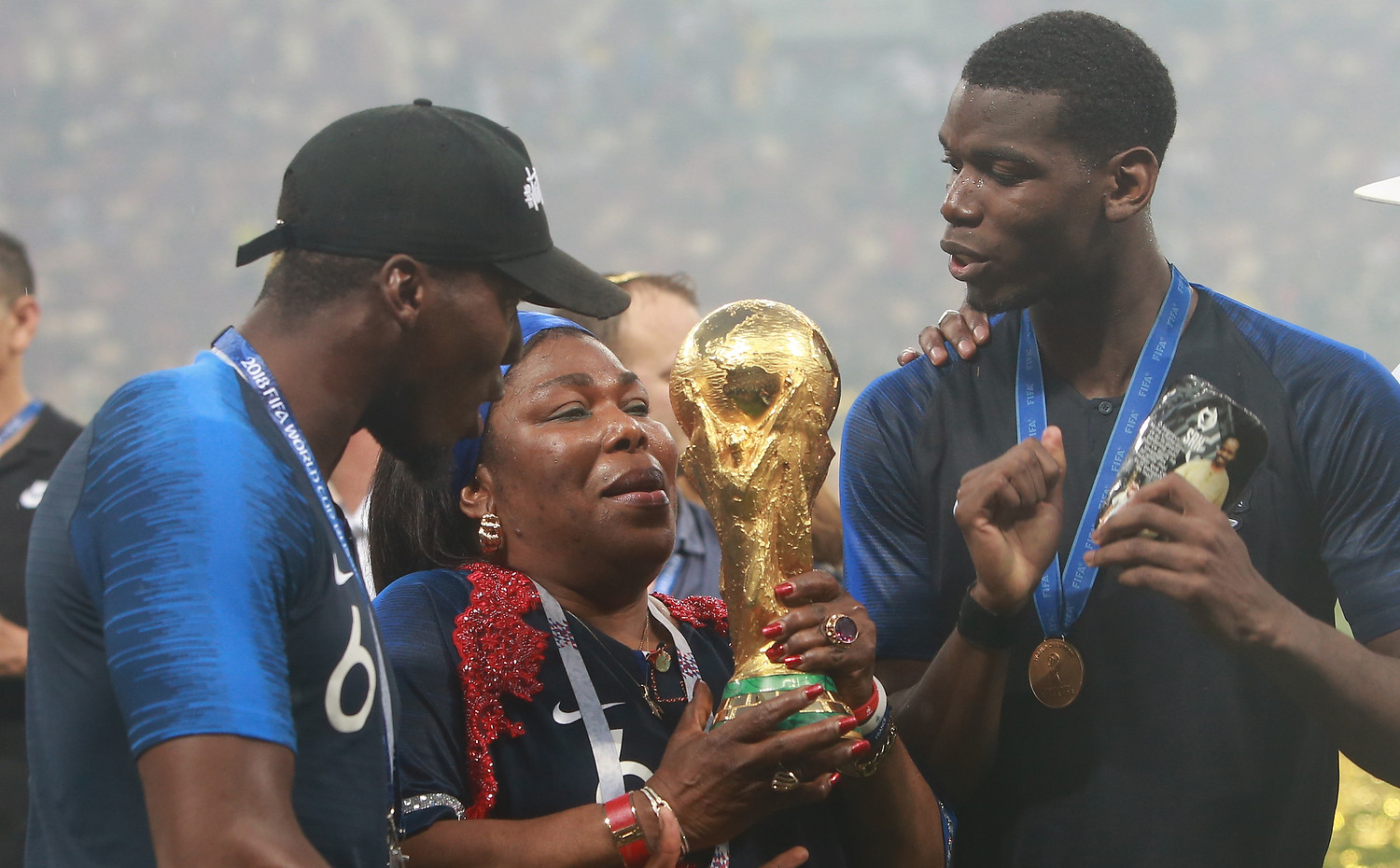
Pogba (right) with his brother Florentin and their mother, holding the World Cup trophy after the 2018 FIFA World Cup final

On 17 May 2018, Pogba was named in the France squad for the 2018 FIFA World Cup in Russia. On 16 June 2018, he took the shot that deflected off Aziz Behich and resulted in the winning goal in France's 2–1 win over Australia in their opening match at the tournament. The goal was initially awarded to Pogba, but the following day FIFA re-awarded it as an own goal to Behich.

In the 59th minute of the 2018 FIFA World Cup final, Pogba extended France's lead over Croatia to 3–1 with a strike from the edge of the penalty area after his initial shot had been blocked. France eventually won the World Cup by a score of 4–2.

==== Euro 2020 and beyond ====
On 23 June 2021, in France's final group match of UEFA Euro 2020 against Portugal, Pogba assisted Karim Benzema's second goal in a 2–2 draw, which saw them top their group. He later scored with a bending 25-yard strike in the round-of-16 match against Switzerland, where France were knocked out of the tournament on penalties after a 3–3 draw.

Pogba was ruled out of the 2022 FIFA World Cup in Qatar following knee surgery.

== Style of play and reception ==
Pogba primarily plays as a central midfielder and can also play as a deep-lying playmaker or as an attacking midfielder. He can also play as an offensive-minded central midfielder that often drifts out wide, known as the "mezzala" role in Italy. During his time in Italy, he gained the nicknames Il Polpo Paul ("Paul the Octopus") for his long legs that look like tentacles and "Pogboom" for his explosive pace and energy on the pitch. A quick, hardworking, and physically strong player, he possesses good aerial abilities, good passing, and good vision. He is also known for his powerful and accurate shots from distance. He is also known for his ability to make forward runs from deeper areas of the pitch. Pogba was described by the Manchester United website as a "powerful, skilful, and creative" player who has "an eye for goal and a penchant for the spectacular." In 2018, an Italian writer for OneFootball said, "Pogba was a unique player—the best Serie A had seen in the last ten years". Particularly regarding Pogba's legacy with the French national team, FourFourTwo wrote, "He wasn't just a 'moments player' for Les Bleus: he was the real deal." The publication further argued that, alongside Kanté, "he would dictate games, with Kante beside him for the dirty work," and that he "would thrive on the biggest stages," ultimately helping to "define his nation's footballing identity for a while."

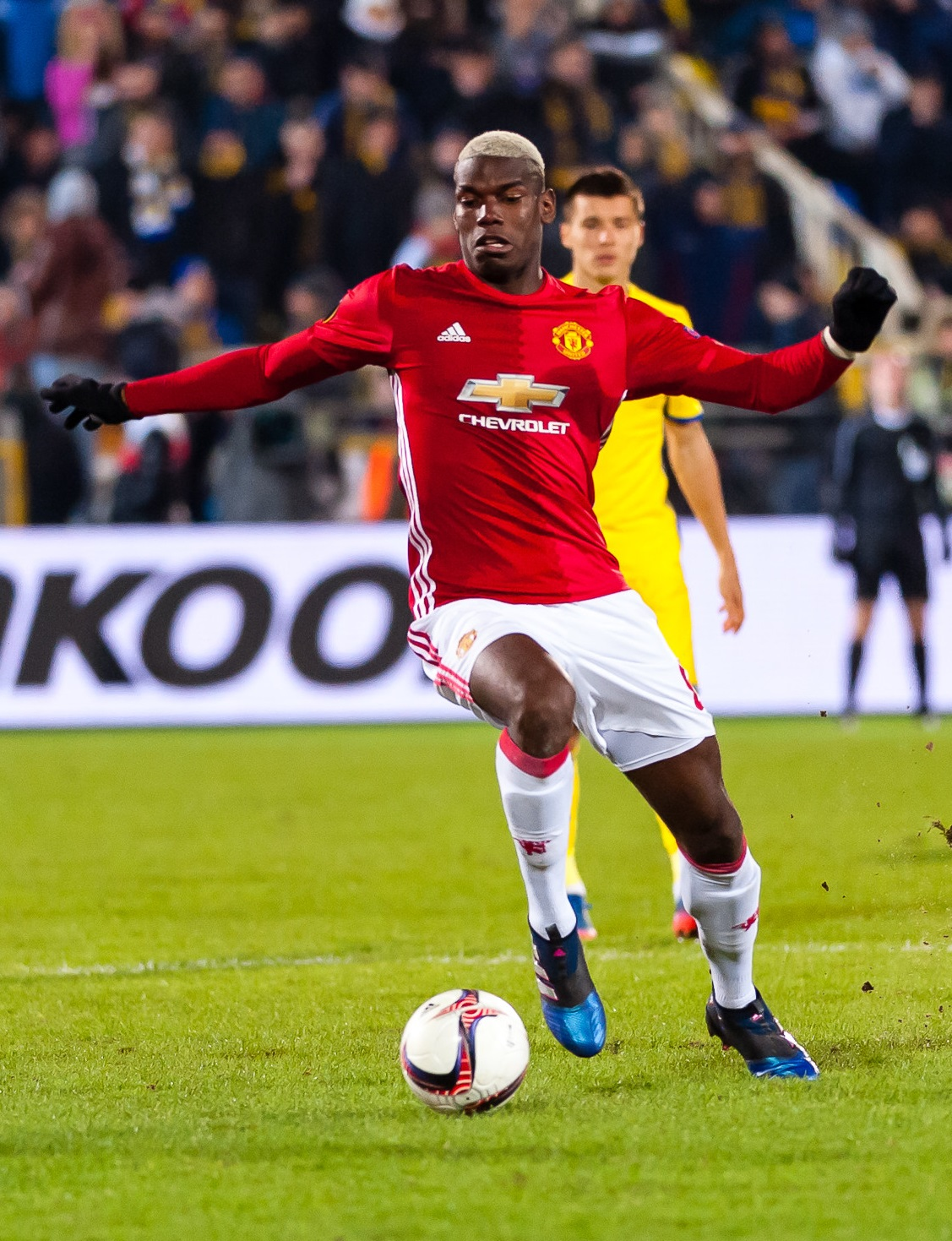
Pogba playing for Manchester United in 2017

Pogba has been widely praised throughout his career by managers and players. Mourinho described him as "already the best midfielder in the world," while Allegri said he had the potential to become the world's best player. Solskjær labelled him "the best all-round midfielder in the world," Phil Neville called him the "best midfielder in Europe," and Rio Ferdinand predicted he would become the world's best midfielder. Frank Lampard admitted Pogba was "naturally more talented" than he ever was, praising his superior technical ability and dribbling, while Patrick Vieira similarly stated that Pogba was "more technically gifted" and far more comfortable on the ball than himself. Premier League player and Belgian international Amadou Onana later reflected that Pogba was "one of the best midfielders of his era." Sports publications have also been praiseful: Sports Illustrated described him as one of Juventus' most iconic modern midfielders, Bleacher Report hailed him as a complete midfielder, and FourFourTwo wrote that "few midfielders on Earth were more complete," highlighting his exceptional passing range, physicality, long-range shooting, pace, and all-around brilliance.

Pogba has often been compared with former France international Vieira in his youth. During his final season with Juventus, he was played as an advanced midfielder, which saw him gain more ball possession and allowed him to function as the team's main playmaker; his performances in this role saw him develop from a promising youngster into one of the best midfielders in the world. Upon his departure from Juventus in 2016, Pogba's former teammate Gianluigi Buffon compared him to former French playmakers Platini and Zinedine Zidane and also praised his leadership and hard work, both on the pitch and in training, stating that he "...is a tremendous warrior on the pitch but also has so much talent. His control of the ball and the way he can swiftly change the play from defence to attack is special." Pogba is also an effective free kick and penalty taker. Despite his talent, he has been accused of being inconsistent. Moreover, he also struggled with injuries during his time with Manchester United.

== Personal life ==
Pogba is a practicing Muslim.

=== Marriage and family ===
He has been married to Bolivian model María Zulay Salaues since 2019 and they have two children together. Pogba can speak French, English, Italian, and Spanish.

=== LGBTQ+ views ===
In August 2017, Pogba spoke about the possibility of openly gay footballers in the Premier League. During a UEFA respect campaign in Monaco, Pogba said that gay footballers should be considered "equal". He also stated that "what he does in his private life has nothing to do with the player ... You have just to respect him ... [because] We are all equal when we play football."

=== Health ===
In March 2022, Pogba said that he had suffered from depression whilst being managed by José Mourinho at Manchester United during 2018.

=== Legal ===
In August 2022, a French investigation was opened following allegations that Pogba was the victim of an extortion plot involving his childhood friends and witchcraft doctors, also called Marabout. Pogba revealed to the French police that he had been physically "trapped by childhood friends" and "two gunmen" asking him for €13 million for past services, including the consultation of witchcraft doctors. He explained that he was also harassed during Juventus training and that he thought about quitting football. It was revealed that large sums of money were demanded from Pogba to avoid the release of videos allegedly compromising him. Two investigations, one in France and one in Italy, were opened on suspicion of extortion attempts. On 19 December 2024, his brother, Mathias Pogba, was sentenced to three years in prison, with two years suspended, for attempted extortion of €13 million. Five other defendants received sentences of up to eight years.

== Media and sponsorships ==
Pogba has a sponsorship with sportswear company Adidas. He appeared in an Adidas 2018 World Cup commercial alongside other footballers like David Beckham, Lionel Messi, and Mohamed Salah, as well as American singer Pharrell Williams.

Appearing in EA Sports' FIFA video game series, Pogba's goal celebration, 'the Dab', was first featured in FIFA 17. Pogba, alongside his brothers Florentin and Mathias, attended the 2017 MTV Europe Music Awards in London, where Paul and English actress Natalie Dormer presented the "Best Song" award to Canadian singer Shawn Mendes.

In December 2025, Paul Pogba expanded his activities beyond professional football by becoming a shareholder and ambassador for the professional camel racing team, the Saudi Arabia-based company Al Haboob, marking a move into the wider sports business sector. In December 2025, Pogba became a shareholder of the Saudi team Al Haboob, the world's first professional camel racing team.

== Career statistics ==
=== Club ===
As of match played 2 May 2026

Appearances and goals by club, season and competition
Club	Season	League			National cup (Note: Includes Coppa Italia, FA Cup)		League cup (Note: Includes Football League/EFL Cup)		Europe		Other		Total	
Club	Season	Division	Apps	Goals	Apps	Goals	Apps	Goals	Apps	Goals	Apps	Goals	Apps	Goals
Manchester United	2010–11	Premier League	0	0	0	0	0	0	0	0	0	0	0	0
Manchester United	2011–12	Premier League	3	0	0	0	3	0	1 (Note: Appearance(s) in UEFA Europa League)	0	0	0	7	0
Manchester United	Total		3	0	0	0	3	0	1	0	0	0	7	0
Juventus	2012–13	Serie A	27	5	2	0	—		8 (Note: Appearances in UEFA Champions League)	0	0	0	37	5
Juventus	2013–14	Serie A	36	7	0	0	—		14 (Note: Six appearances in UEFA Champions League, eight appearances and one goal in UEFA Europa League)	1	1 (Note: Appearance in Supercoppa Italiana)	1	51	9
Juventus	2014–15	Serie A	26	8	4	1	—		10	1	1	0	41	10
Juventus	2015–16	Serie A	35	8	5	1	—		8	1	1	0	49	10
Juventus	Total		124	28	11	2	—		40	3	3	1	178	34
Manchester United	2016–17	Premier League	30	5	2	0	4	1	15	3	—		51	9
Manchester United	2017–18	Premier League	27	6	3	0	1	0	5	0	1 (Note: Appearance in UEFA Super Cup)	0	37	6
Manchester United	2018–19	Premier League	35	13	3	1	0	0	9	2	—		47	16
Manchester United	2019–20	Premier League	16	1	2	0	1	0	3	0	—		22	1
Manchester United	2020–21	Premier League	26	3	2	0	3	1	11 (Note: Five appearances in UEFA Champions League, six appearances and two goals in UEFA Europa League)	2	—		42	6
Manchester United	2021–22	Premier League	20	1	1	0	0	0	6	0	—		27	1
Manchester United	Total		154	29	13	1	9	2	49	7	1	0	226	39
Juventus	2022–23	Serie A	6	0	1	0	—		3	0	—		10	0
Juventus	2023–24	Serie A	2	0	0	0	—		—		—		2	0
Juventus	Total		8	0	1	0	—		3	0	—		12	0
Monaco	2025–26	Ligue 1	6	0	0	0	—		0	0	—		6	0
Career total			295	57	25	3	12	2	93	10	4	1	429	73

=== International ===
As of match played 29 March 2022

Appearances and goals by national team and year
National team	Year	Apps	Goals
France
France	2013	7	1
France	2014	15	4
France	2015	5	0
France	2016	17	3
France	2017	5	0
France	2018	15	2
France	2019	5	0
France	2020	6	0
France	2021	14	1
France	2022	2	0
Total		91	11

France score listed first, score column indicates score after each Pogba goal

List of international goals scored by Paul Pogba
No.	Date	Venue	Cap	Opponent	Score	Result	Competition
1	10 September 2013	Central Stadium, Gomel, Belarus	3	Belarus	4–2	4–2	2014 FIFA World Cup qualification
2	27 May 2014	Stade de France, Saint-Denis, France	9	Norway	1–0	4–0	Friendly
3	30 June 2014	Estádio Nacional Mané Garrincha, Brasília, Brazil	15	Nigeria	1–0	2–0	2014 FIFA World Cup
4	7 September 2014	Partizan Stadium, Belgrade, Serbia	18	Serbia	1–0	1–1	Friendly
5	11 October 2014	Stade de France, Saint-Denis, France	19	Portugal	2–0	2–1	Friendly
6	3 July 2016	Stade de France, Saint-Denis, France	36	Iceland	2–0	5–2	UEFA Euro 2016
7	10 October 2016	Amsterdam Arena, Amsterdam, Netherlands	42	Netherlands	1–0	1–0	2018 FIFA World Cup qualification
8	11 November 2016	Stade de France, Saint-Denis, France	43	Sweden	1–1	2–1	2018 FIFA World Cup qualification
9	27 March 2018	Krestovsky Stadium, Saint Petersburg, Russia	51	Russia	2–0	3–1	Friendly
10	15 July 2018	Luzhniki Stadium, Moscow, Russia	60	Croatia	3–1	4–2	2018 FIFA World Cup
11	28 June 2021	Arena Națională, Bucharest, Romania	84	Switzerland	3–1	3–3 (a.e.t.)	UEFA Euro 2020

== Honours ==
Juventus

- Serie A: 2012–13, 2013–14, 2014–15, 2015–16
- Coppa Italia: 2014–15, 2015–16
- Supercoppa Italiana: 2013, 2015
- UEFA Champions League runner-up: 2014–15

Manchester United

- EFL Cup: 2016–17
- UEFA Europa League: 2016–17; runner-up: 2020–21
- FA Cup runner-up: 2017–18
- UEFA Super Cup runner-up: 2017

France U20

- FIFA U-20 World Cup: 2013

France

- FIFA World Cup: 2018
- UEFA Nations League: 2020–21
- UEFA European Championship runner-up: 2016

Individual

- UEFA European Under-17 Championship Team of the Tournament: 2010
- UEFA European Under-19 Championship Team of the Tournament: 2012
- FIFA U-20 World Cup Golden Ball: 2013
- Golden Boy: 2013
- Serie A Team of the Year: 2013–14, 2014–15, 2015–16
- FIFA World Cup Young Player Award: 2014
- Bravo Award: 2014
- L'Équipe World Team: 2015
- UEFA Team of the Year: 2015
- FIFA FIFPro World11: 2015
- ESM Team of the Year: 2015–16, 2018–19
- Serie A top assist provider: 2015–16
- UEFA Serie A Team of the Season: 2015–16
- CIES Football Observatory Best Europe XI: 2016–17
- CIES Football Observatory Best Premier League XI: 2016–17
- CIES Football Observatory Best Central Defensive Midfielder runner-up: 2016–17
- UEFA Europa League Squad of the Season: 2016–17, 2020–21
- UEFA Europa League Player of the Season: 2016–17
- PFA Team of the Year: 2018–19 Premier League
- Globe Soccer Awards Sports Comeback of the Year: 2025

Orders

- Knight of the Legion of Honour: 2018
