= Luca Marrone =

Italian footballer (born 1990)

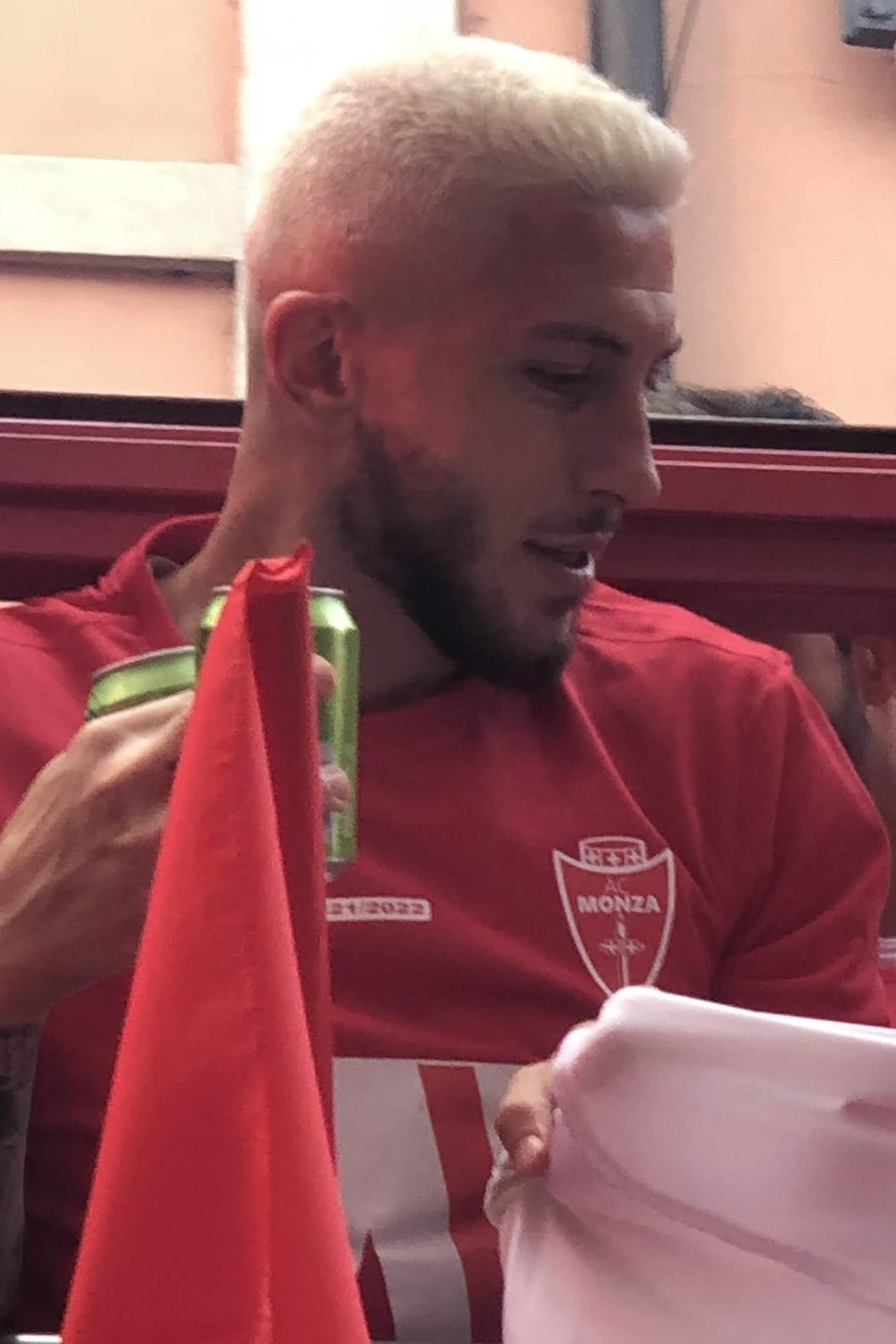
- Marrone with Monza in 2022

Personal information
- Date of birth: 28 March 1990 (age 36)
- Place of birth: Turin, Italy
- Height: 1.86 m (6 ft 1 in)
- Positions: Centre-back; defensive midfielder

Youth career
- 1995–1998: Lascaris
- 1998–2009: Juventus

Senior career*
Years	Team	Apps	(Gls)
2009–2013	Juventus	15	(1)
2010–2011	→ Siena (loan)	18	(1)
2013–2014	Sassuolo	15	(0)
2014–2019	Juventus	0	(0)
2015–2016	→ Carpi (loan)	9	(1)
2016	→ Hellas Verona (loan)	12	(0)
2016–2017	→ Zulte Waregem (loan)	25	(0)
2017–2018	→ Bari (loan)	34	(1)
2018–2019	→ Hellas Verona (loan)	24	(0)
2019–2020	Hellas Verona	0	(0)
2019–2020	→ Crotone (loan)	31	(3)
2020–2021	Crotone	21	(0)
2021–2023	Monza	24	(1)
2023–2026	Lecco	41	(3)
2024	→ Cremonese (loan)	2	(0)

International career
2006–2007	Italy U17	4	(0)
2007	Italy U19	1	(0)
2009–2013	Italy U21	32	(1)
- * Club domestic league appearances and goals as of 29 April 2026

Luca Marrone (born 28 March 1990) is an Italian professional footballer who plays as a centre-back or defensive midfielder.

== Club career ==
=== Early career ===
Born in Bosconero, a comune in the Province of Turin, Marrone began playing football with local club Lascaris in 1995 at the age of five and was scouted by provincial giants Torino and Juventus. A childhood Juventus fan, he chose the latter and joined their youth system at age eight.

=== Juventus ===
At age eight, Marrone joined the Juventus youth system, and made his way through the ranks of the youth sector all the way through to the Primavera (under-20) youth squad for the 2007–08 season. After impressing in the Primavera side for a couple of seasons, then-Juve head coach and former youth director at the club Ciro Ferrara called Marrone to join the first team squad for the 2009–10 Serie A pre-season. After taking part in a number of friendly matches and pre-season tournaments, including the Peace Cup and the TIM Trophy, Marrone was called up to the Juventus bench for the season opener against Chievo. He went on to make his Serie A debut as a 70th-minute substitute for Tiago. He also received a yellow card later in that match. In September, he made his second appearance against Livorno as a late substitute for Mauro Camoranesi and was named on the bench for a number of important Serie A and European matches. In February 2010, he captained the Primavera team to a successful defence of the Viareggio Tournament title. He was once again called up for the summer training camp with the first team prior to the 2010–11 Serie A season under new head coach Luigi Delneri.

On 1 July 2010, Marrone was sent to Siena with former Primavera teammate Ciro Immobile on a season-long loan deal in order to gain regular first-team playing time. He had a relatively successful spell with the Serie B side under former Juventus player Antonio Conte and helped the side reach second-place and gain automatic promotion back to Serie A.

Marrone returned to Juventus on 30 June 2011 upon the expiration of the loan deal. He was to be loaned out again until Conte, who had been recently appointed new Juventus manager, blocked the move and included the youngster in his plans for the upcoming season. He made his first start for the club in the Coppa Italia fixture against Bologna and first appearance of the season away at Lecce in January. His first assist came in an away victory against Atalanta. He started his first Serie A match and scored his first top-flight goal in the return leg against the club from Bergamo on the last matchday of the season, as Juventus won the Scudetto undefeated.

Marrone started in the opening match of the 2012–13 Serie A season against Parma in a 2–0 win, replacing the injured Giorgio Chiellini in an unfamiliar position as centre back but managed to help keep a clean sheet. Throughout the remainder of the 2012–13 Serie A campaign, he was regularly utilized in central defence after that match. For the second season running, Marrone and Juventus finished the campaign as champions of Italy.

=== Sassuolo ===
Initially part of the first-team plans for Juventus prior to the start of the 2013–14 Serie A season, Marrone was sold to newly promoted Serie A side Sassuolo on 2 September 2013 on a co-ownership deal. The deal served as an exchange for 50% of the contract of Sassuolo's Domenico Berardi, who joined Juventus on a co-ownership deal but remained at Sassuolo on loan for the 2013–14 campaign. Marrone's season with the neroverdi began well, but was ultimately hampered by injuries that limited the midfielder to just 15 league appearances. On 20 June 2014, the co-ownership deal was renewed between Sassuolo and Juventus, with Sassuolo retaining the playing rights for the player.

=== Return to Juventus ===
On 3 July 2014, however, Marrone returned to Juventus once more after Juventus bought out the remaining 50% of his contract from Sassuolo in a deal worth €5 million (€500,000 plus the transfer of Federico Peluso). He also signed a five-year contract that binds him to Juventus until 30 June 2019.

==== Hellas Verona (loan) ====
Marrone joined Hellas Verona on loan from Juventus on 28 January 2016. He made his debut on 7 February 2016 against Internazionale for the club where Verona were fighting from relegation. Marrone provided three assist to all three goals which ended as draw.

==== Zulte Waregem (loan) ====
In August 2016, Marrone was loaned out to Zulte Waregem. In January 2023, Zulte Waregem offered a two-and-a-half-year contract to bring Marrone back but was rejected for personal reasons.

==== Bari (loan) ====
On 26 August 2017 Marrone joined Bari.

==== Second loan to Hellas Verona ====
On 4 August 2018, Marrone re-joined Verona on another season-long loan with an obligation to buy.

==== Loan to Crotone ====
On 29 August 2019, Marrone joined Crotone on loan until 30 June 2020.

=== Monza ===
On 31 August 2021, Marrone joined Serie B side Monza on a permanent deal. He made his debut on 11 September, in a 1–1 league draw against SPAL.

=== Lecco ===
On 30 August 2023, Marrone signed a two-year contract with Lecco. On 1 February 2024, he was loaned to Cremonese, with an option to buy.

== International career ==
Marrone made his debut with the Italy under-21 squad on 13 October 2009, under coach Pierluigi Casiraghi, in a qualifier match against Bosnia and Herzegovina. In March 2010, he scored his first goal for the Azzurrini, a 20-yard volley in a 2–0 victory over Hungary to put them second in their qualifying group. Under former Primavera coach Ciro Ferrara, he continued to be a regular.

== Style of play ==
A central midfielder skilled in retrieving balls and restarting plays, Marrone prefers the role of playmaker in front of the defense, however he can be used if necessary as a centre-back.

== Career statistics ==
=== Club ===
As of match played 30 August 2022

Appearances and goals by club, season and competition
Club	Season	League			National cup (Note: Includes Coppa Italia, Belgian Cup)		Continental		Other		Total	
Club	Season	Division	Apps	Goals	Apps	Goals	Apps	Goals	Apps	Goals	Apps	Goals
Juventus	2009–10	Serie A	2	0	0	0	0	0	—		2	0
Juventus	2010–11	Serie A	—		—		—		—		0	0
Juventus	2011–12	Serie A	3	1	3	0	—		—		6	1
Juventus	2012–13	Serie A	10	0	4	0	1 (Note: Appearance in UEFA Champions League)	0	0	0	15	0
Juventus	2013–14	Serie A	0	0	0	0	—		0	0	0	0
Juventus	Total		15	1	7	0	1	0	0	0	23	1
Siena (loan)	2010–11	Serie B	18	1	1	0	—		—		19	1
Sassuolo	2013–14	Serie A	15	0	—		—		—		15	0
Juventus	2014–15	Serie A	0	0	0	0	—		—		0	0
Juventus	2015–16	Serie A	—		—		—		—		0	0
Juventus	2016–17	Serie A	0	0	—		—		—		0	0
Juventus	2017–18	Serie A	—		—		—		—		0	0
Juventus	2018–19	Serie A	—		—		—		—		0	0
Juventus	Total		0	0	0	0	0	0	0	0	0	0
Carpi (loan)	2015–16	Serie A	9	1	4	0	—		—		13	1
Hellas Verona (loan)	2015–16	Serie A	12	0	—		—		—		12	0
Zulte Waregem (loan)	2016–17	First Division A	25	0	3	1	—		—		28	1
Bari (loan)	2017–18	Serie B	34	1	—		—		—		34	1
Hellas Verona (loan)	2018–19	Serie B	24	0	2	0	—		—		26	0
Hellas Verona	2019–20	Serie A	0	0	0	0	—		—		0	0
Crotone (loan)	2019–20	Serie B	31	3	—		—		—		31	3
Crotone	2020–21	Serie A	21	0	1	0	—		—		22	0
Monza	2021–22	Serie B	18	0	—		—		4 (Note: Appearances in play-offs)	1	22	1
Monza	2022–23	Serie A	2	0	1	0	—		—		3	0
Monza	Total		20	0	1	0	0	0	4	1	25	1
Career total			224	7	19	1	1	0	4	1	248	9

== Honours ==
Siena

- Serie B runner-up: 2010–11

Juventus

- Serie A: 2011–12, 2012–13, 2014–15
- Supercoppa Italiana: 2012, 2013
- Coppa Italia: 2014–15; runner-up: 2012

Zulte Waregem

- Belgian Cup: 2016–17
