= 2013 Supercoppa Italiana =

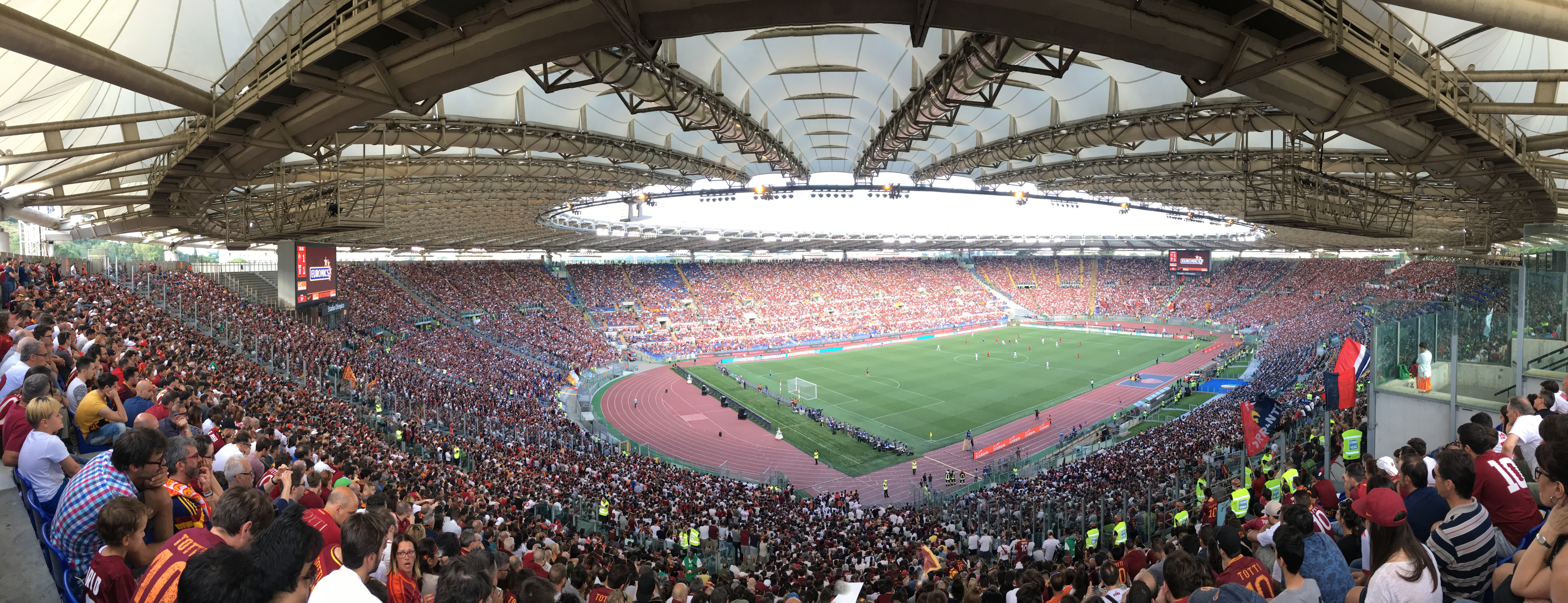
- The Stadio Olimpico in Rome held the match
Juventus	Lazio
Serie A	Coppa Italia
4	0
- Date: 18 August 2013
- Venue: Stadio Olimpico, Rome
- Referee: Gianluca Rocchi
- Attendance: 57,000

The 2013 TIM Supercoppa Italiana Final was the 26th edition of the Supercoppa, an annual football match contested by the winners of the previous season's Serie A and Coppa Italia competitions. Defending champions Juventus, also reigning Serie A champions, won the game 4–0 against Coppa Italia holders Lazio. It was Juventus' second consecutive Supercoppa win, and sixth overall, matching Milan's record.

== Details ==
18 August 2013
21:00 UTC+02:00

Juventus	4–0	Lazio
Pogba 23'; Chiellini 52'; Lichtsteiner 54'; Tevez 56'	Report

Stadio Olimpico, Rome
Attendance: 57,000
Referee: Gianluca Rocchi

Juventus	Lazio

GK	1	(Italy) Gianluigi Buffon (c)
CB	15	(Italy) Andrea Barzagli	(yellow card) 43'	(substituted off) 75'
CB	19	(Italy) Leonardo Bonucci
CB	3	(Italy) Giorgio Chiellini
RM	26	(Switzerland) Stephan Lichtsteiner		(substituted off) 82'
DM	21	(Italy) Andrea Pirlo
CM	23	(Chile) Arturo Vidal
CM	8	(Italy) Claudio Marchisio		(substituted off) 20'
LM	22	(Ghana) Kwadwo Asamoah
CF	10	(Argentina) Carlos Tevez
CF	9	(Montenegro) Mirko Vučinić
Substitutes:
GK	30	(Italy) Marco Storari
DF	4	(Uruguay) Martín Cáceres		(substituted on) 75'
DF	5	(Italy) Angelo Ogbonna		(substituted on) 82'
DF	11	(Italy) Paolo De Ceglie
DF	33	(Chile) Mauricio Isla
MF	6	(France) Paul Pogba		(substituted on) 20'
MF	17	(Italy) Luca Marrone
MF	20	(Italy) Simone Padoin
FW	12	(Italy) Sebastian Giovinco
FW	14	(Spain) Fernando Llorente
FW	27	(Italy) Fabio Quagliarella
FW	32	(Italy) Alessandro Matri
Manager:
(Italy) Antonio Conte

GK	22	(Italy) Federico Marchetti
RB	39	(Belgium) Luis Pedro Cavanda
CB	3	(Brazil) André Dias	(yellow card) 59'
CB	20	(Italy) Giuseppe Biava
LB	26	(Romania) Ștefan Radu		(substituted off) 58'
DM	24	(Italy) Cristian Ledesma (c)		(substituted off) 56'
RM	87	(Italy) Antonio Candreva
CM	8	(Brazil) Hernanes	(yellow card) 31'	(substituted off) 70'
CM	5	(Argentina) Lucas Biglia
LM	19	(Bosnia and Herzegovina) Senad Lulić
CF	11	(Germany) Miroslav Klose
Substitutes:
GK	1	(Argentina) Albano Bizzarri
GK	95	(Albania) Thomas Strakosha
DF	2	(France) Michaël Ciani
DF	85	(Argentina) Diego Novaretti
MF	4	(Italy) Luca Crecco
MF	10	(Brazil) Ederson		(substituted on) 56'
MF	15	(Uruguay) Álvaro González
MF	23	(Nigeria) Ogenyi Onazi		(substituted on) 70'
MF	27	(Albania) Lorik Cana
FW	18	(Czech Republic) Libor Kozák
FW	25	(Italy) Antonio Rozzi
FW	99	(Italy) Sergio Floccari		(substituted on) 58'
Manager:
(Switzerland) Vladimir Petković

== See also ==
- 2013–14 Juventus FC season
- 2013–14 SS Lazio season

Played between same clubs:

- 1998 Supercoppa Italiana
- 2015 Supercoppa Italiana
- 2017 Supercoppa Italiana
- 2019 Supercoppa Italiana
