= 2014–15 in Italian football =

Football in Italy
- Season: 2014–15

Men's football
- Serie A: Juventus
- Serie B: Carpi
- Coppa Italia: Juventus
- Supercoppa Italiana: Napoli

The 2014–15 season was the 113th season of competitive football in Italy.

== Promotions and relegations (pre-season) ==
Teams promoted to Serie A

- Palermo
- Empoli
- Cesena

Teams relegated from Serie A

- Bologna
- Catania
- Livorno

Teams promoted to Serie B

- Pro Vercelli
- Perugia
- Virtus Entella
- Frosinone

Teams relegated from Serie B

- Novara
- Padova
- Juve Stabia
- Reggina

== League tables ==
=== Serie A ===
Pos	Team	Pld	W	D	L	GF	GA	GD	Pts	Qualification or relegation
1	Juventus (C)	38	26	9	3	72	24	+48	87	Qualification for the Champions League group stage
2	Roma	38	19	13	6	54	31	+23	70	Qualification for the Champions League group stage
3	Lazio	38	21	6	11	71	38	+33	69	Qualification for the Champions League play-off round
4	Fiorentina	38	18	10	10	61	46	+15	64	Qualification for the Europa League group stage (Note: Since the winners of the 2014–15 Coppa Italia (Juventus) qualified for European competition based on league position, the spot awarded to the cup winners (Europa League group stage) was passed to the fifth-placed team and the spot originally meant for the fifth-placed team (Europa League third qualifying round) was given to the highest placed team that has obtained an UEFA licence and not already qualified for European competition.)
5	Napoli	38	18	9	11	70	54	+16	63	Qualification for the Europa League group stage
6	Genoa (Note: Genoa failed to obtain a UEFA licence from Italian Football Federation. Therefore, they were barred to participate in European competitions. Genoa appealed the decision, but the appeal was denied.)	38	16	11	11	62	47	+15	59	
7	Sampdoria	38	13	17	8	48	42	+6	56	Qualification for the Europa League third qualifying round
8	Internazionale	38	14	13	11	59	48	+11	55	
9	Torino	38	14	12	12	48	45	+3	54	
10	Milan	38	13	13	12	56	50	+6	52	
11	Palermo	38	12	13	13	53	55	−2	49 (Note: Palermo finished ahead of Sassuolo on head-to-head away goals scored: Palermo 2-1 Sassuolo, Sassuolo 0-0 Palermo.)	
12	Sassuolo	38	12	13	13	49	57	−8	49	
13	Hellas Verona	38	11	13	14	49	65	−16	46	
14	Chievo	38	10	13	15	28	41	−13	43	
15	Empoli	38	8	18	12	46	52	−6	42	
16	Udinese	38	10	11	17	43	56	−13	41	
17	Atalanta	38	7	16	15	38	57	−19	37	
18	Cagliari (R)	38	8	10	20	48	68	−20	34	Relegation to Serie B
19	Cesena (R)	38	4	12	22	36	73	−37	24	Relegation to Serie B
20	Parma (L, R)	38	6	8	24	33	75	−42	19 (Note: Parma was docked 7 points for failing to pay over players' wages. Later the club announced bankruptcy, and it was recreated without professional status.)	Relegation to Serie D

Source: 2014–15 Serie A, 2014-15 Serie A classification.
Rules for classification: 1) points; 2) head-to-head points; 3) head-to-head goal difference; 4) goal difference; 5) number of goals scored; 6) draw. (Head-to-head record is applied for clubs with the same number of points only once all matches between said clubs have been played.).
(C) Champions; (L) Liquidated after the season due to bankruptcy.; (R) Relegated

=== Serie B ===
Pos	Team	Pld	W	D	L	GF	GA	GD	Pts	Promotion, qualification or relegation
1	Carpi (C, P)	42	22	14	6	59	28	+31	80	Promotion to Serie A
2	Frosinone (P)	42	20	11	11	62	49	+13	71	Promotion to Serie A
3	Vicenza	42	18	14	10	44	37	+7	68	Qualification to promotion play-offs semi-finals
4	Bologna (O, P)	42	17	17	8	49	35	+14	68	Qualification to promotion play-offs semi-finals
5	Spezia	42	18	13	11	59	40	+19	67	Qualification to promotion play-offs preliminary round
6	Perugia	42	16	18	8	49	40	+9	66	Qualification to promotion play-offs preliminary round
7	Pescara	42	16	13	13	69	55	+14	61	Qualification to promotion play-offs preliminary round
8	Avellino	42	15	14	13	42	42	0	59	Qualification to promotion play-offs preliminary round
9	Livorno	42	15	14	13	57	50	+7	59	
10	Bari	42	14	12	16	43	49	−6	54	
11	Trapani	42	13	14	15	56	67	−11	53	
12	Ternana	42	13	12	17	36	47	−11	51	
13	Latina	42	11	17	14	38	41	−3	50	
14	Virtus Lanciano	42	10	20	12	49	48	+1	50	
15	Pro Vercelli	42	12	13	17	46	57	−11	49	
16	Crotone	42	12	12	18	42	52	−10	48	
17	Modena	42	10	17	15	37	39	−2	47	Qualification to relegation play-offs
18	Virtus Entella (Note: Virtus Entella was readmitted to Serie B after Catania's relegation.)	42	10	17	15	37	52	−15	47	Qualification to relegation play-offs
19	Cittadella (R)	42	9	17	16	47	56	−9	44	Relegation to Lega Pro
20	Brescia (Note: Brescia was docked 6 points. They were also readmitted to Serie B after the bankruptcy of Parma in Serie A.) (T)	42	12	12	18	54	63	−9	42	Spared from relegation
21	Varese (Note: Varese was docked 4 points for financial irregularities; a phoenix club was admitted to Eccellenza due to Varese's exclusion from Lega Pro.) (D, R, E, R)	42	9	12	21	40	67	−27	35	Revival in Eccellenza
22	Catania (Note: Catania was assigned as the last due to match-fixing scandal on 20 August 2015.) (D, R)	42	12	13	17	59	60	−1	49	Relegation to Lega Pro

Source: Lega Serie B
(C) Champions; (D) Disqualified; (E) Eliminated; (O) Play-off winners; (P) Promoted; (R) Relegated; (T) Qualified, but not yet for the particular phase indicated

== Road to the final ==
Juventus		Round	Lazio
Opponent	Result	2014–15 Coppa Italia	Opponent	Result
N/A	N/A	Third round	Bassano Virtus	7–0
N/A	N/A	Fourth round	Varese	3–0
Hellas Verona	6–1	Round of 16	Torino	3–1
Parma	1–0	Quarter-finals	Milan	1–0
Fiorentina	1–2, 3–0 (4–2 agg.)	Semi-finals	Napoli	1–1, 1–0 (2–1 agg.)

20 May 2015
20:45 CEST

Juventus	2–1 (a.e.t.)	Lazio
Chiellini 11'; Matri 97'	Report	Radu 4'

Stadio Olimpico, Rome
Referee: Daniele Orsato

Juventus	Lazio

GK	30	(Italy) Marco Storari
CB	15	(Italy) Andrea Barzagli
CB	19	(Italy) Leonardo Bonucci	(yellow card) 64'
CB	3	(Italy) Giorgio Chiellini
RWB	26	(Switzerland) Stephan Lichtsteiner		(substituted off) 115'
CM	23	(Chile) Arturo Vidal
CM	21	(Italy) Andrea Pirlo
CM	6	(France) Paul Pogba		(substituted off) 78'
LWB	33	(France) Patrice Evra	(yellow card) 60'
CF	14	(Spain) Fernando Llorente		(substituted off) 84'
CF	10	(Argentina) Carlos Tevez
Substitutes:
GK	1	(Italy) Gianluigi Buffon
DF	5	(Italy) Angelo Ogbonna
DF	7	(Italy) Simone Pepe
FW	11	(France) Kingsley Coman
DF	17	(Italy) Paolo De Ceglie
MF	20	(Italy) Simone Padoin		(substituted on) 115'
MF	22	(Ghana) Kwadwo Asamoah
MF	27	(Italy) Stefano Sturaro
FW	32	(Italy) Alessandro Matri	(yellow card) 97'	(substituted on) 84'
GK	34	(Brazil) Rubinho
MF	37	(Argentina) Roberto Pereyra		(substituted on) 78'
MF	39	(Italy) Luca Marrone
Manager:
(Italy) Massimiliano Allegri

GK	1	(Albania) Etrit Berisha
CB	3	(Netherlands) Stefan de Vrij		(substituted off) 105'
CB	18	(Argentina) Santiago Gentiletti
CB	26	(Romania) Ștefan Radu		(substituted off) 71'
RM	8	(Serbia) Dušan Basta
CM	16	(Italy) Marco Parolo	(yellow card) 18'
CM	32	(Italy) Danilo Cataldi
LM	19	(Bosnia and Herzegovina) Senad Lulić
RW	87	(Italy) Antonio Candreva	(yellow card) 108'
CF	11	(Germany) Miroslav Klose		(substituted off) 83'
LW	7	(Brazil) Felipe Anderson
Substitutes:
DF	2	(France) Michaël Ciani
DF	5	(Netherlands) Edson Braafheid
MF	6	(Italy) Stefano Mauri
FW	9	(Serbia) Filip Đorđević		(substituted on) 83'
FW	14	(Spain) Keita		(substituted on) 105'
GK	22	(Italy) Federico Marchetti
MF	23	(Nigeria) Ogenyi Onazi
MF	24	(Italy) Cristian Ledesma
DF	33	(Brazil) Maurício		(substituted on) 71'
DF	39	(Belgium) Luis Pedro Cavanda
GK	77	(Albania) Thomas Strakosha
DF	85	(Argentina) Diego Novaretti
Manager:
(Italy) Stefano Pioli

=== UEFA Champions League ===
==== Group stage ====
Pos	Team	Pld	W	D	L	GF	GA	GD	Pts	Qualification	ATM	JUV	OLY	MAL
1	(Spain) Atlético Madrid	6	4	1	1	14	3	+11	13	Advance to knockout phase	—	1–0	4–0	5–0
2	(Italy) Juventus	6	3	1	2	7	4	+3	10	Advance to knockout phase	0–0	—	3–2	2–0
3	(Greece) Olympiacos	6	3	0	3	10	13	−3	9	Transfer to Europa League	3–2	1–0	—	4–2
4	(Sweden) Malmö FF	6	1	0	5	4	15	−11	3		0–2	0–2	2–0	—

Source: UEFA
Rules for classification: Group stage tiebreakers

16 September 2014 1	Juventus (Italy)	2–0	(Sweden) Malmö FF	Turin, Italy
20:45 CEST (UTC+02:00)	Tevez 59', 90'	Report	Konate (yellow card) 10'; M. Eriksson (yellow card) 22'; Helander (yellow card) 89'	Stadium: Juventus Stadium; Attendance: 31,218; Referee: Szymon Marciniak (Poland)

1 October 2014 2	Atlético Madrid (Spain)	1–0	(Italy) Juventus	Madrid, Spain
20:45 CEST (UTC+02:00)	García (yellow card) 54'; Ansaldi (yellow card) 63'; Turan 75'	Report	Bonucci (yellow card) 13'; Chiellini (yellow card) 57'; Lichtsteiner (yellow card) 85'; Morata (yellow card) 86'; Pogba (yellow card) 90+1'; Giovinco (yellow card) 90+4'	Stadium: Vicente Calderón; Attendance: 44,322; Referee: Felix Brych (Germany)

22 October 2014 3	Olympiacos (Greece)	1–0	(Italy) Juventus	Piraeus, Greece
20:45 CEST (UTC+02:00)	Kasami 36'; Botía (yellow card) 44'; Masuaku (yellow card) 56'	Report	Lichtsteiner (yellow card) 38'; Pogba (yellow card) 59'; Marchisio (yellow card) 66'	Stadium: Karaiskakis Stadium; Attendance: 31,411; Referee: Milorad Mažić (Serbia)

4 November 2014 4	Juventus (Italy)	3–2	(Greece) Olympiacos	Turin, Italy
20:45 CET (UTC+01:00)	Pirlo 21'; Tevez (yellow card) 49'; Roberto 65' (o.g.); Pogba 66'	Report	Botía 24', (yellow card) 85'; N'Dinga 61'	Stadium: Juventus Stadium; Attendance: 39,091; Referee: Martin Atkinson (England)

26 November 2014 5	Malmö FF (Sweden)	0–2	(Italy) Juventus	Malmö, Sweden
20:45 CET (UTC+01:00)	Olsen (yellow card) 88'; E. Johansson (yellow card) 89' (yellow-red card) 89'; Rosenberg (yellow card) 90'	Report	Llorente 49'; Pereyra (yellow card) 85'; Tevez 88'; Morata (yellow card) 90+1'	Stadium: Swedbank Stadion; Attendance: 20,500; Referee: Pedro Proença (Portugal)

9 December 2014 6	Juventus (Italy)	0–0	(Spain) Atlético Madrid	Turin, Italy
20:45 CET (UTC+01:00)	Vidal (yellow card) 22'	Report	Suárez (yellow card) 26'; Siqueira (yellow card) 37'	Stadium: Juventus Stadium; Attendance: 39,219; Referee: William Collum (Scotland)

==== Knockout phase ====
===== Round of 16 =====
24 February 2015 First leg	Juventus (Italy)	2–1	(Germany) Borussia Dortmund	Turin, Italy
20:45 CET (UTC+01:00)	Tevez 13'; Morata 43'; Vidal (yellow card) 48'; Pereyra (yellow card) 79'	Report	Reus 18'	Stadium: Juventus Stadium; Attendance: 41,182; Referee: Antonio Mateu Lahoz (Spain)

18 March 2015 Second leg	Borussia Dortmund (Germany)	0–3 (1–5 agg.)	(Italy) Juventus	Dortmund, Germany
20:45 CET (UTC+01:00)	Reus (yellow card) 73'	Report	Tevez 3', 79'; Morata 70'	Stadium: Signal Iduna Park; Attendance: 65,851; Referee: Milorad Mažić (Serbia)

===== Quarter-finals =====
14 April 2015 First leg	Juventus (Italy)	1–0	(France) Monaco	Turin, Italy
20:45 CEST (UTC+02:00)	Vidal 57' (pen.)	Report	Carvalho (yellow card) 55'	Stadium: Juventus Stadium; Attendance: 40,801; Referee: Pavel Královec (Czech Republic)

22 April 2015 Second leg	Monaco (France)	0–0 (0–1 agg.)	(Italy) Juventus	Monaco
20:45 CEST (UTC+02:00)	Silva (yellow card) 50'; Kondogbia (yellow card) 76'	Report	Chiellini (yellow card) 1'; Tevez (yellow card) 86'	Stadium: Stade Louis II; Attendance: 16,889; Referee: William Collum (Scotland)

===== Semi-finals =====
5 May 2015 First leg	Juventus (Italy)	2–1	(Spain) Real Madrid	Turin, Italy
20:45 CEST (UTC+02:00)	Bonucci (yellow card) 5'; Morata 9'; Tevez (yellow card) 46', (goal) 58' (pen.); Vidal (yellow card) 56'; Chiellini (yellow card) 90+3'	Report	Ronaldo 27'; Marcelo (yellow card) 57'; Carvajal (yellow card) 75'; Rodríguez (yellow card) 85'	Stadium: Juventus Stadium; Attendance: 41,011; Referee: Martin Atkinson (England)

13 May 2015 Second leg	Real Madrid (Spain)	1–1 (2–3 agg.)	(Italy) Juventus	Madrid, Spain
20:45 CEST (UTC+02:00)	Ronaldo 23' (pen.); Isco (yellow card) 32'; Rodríguez (yellow card) 44'	Report	Morata 57'; Tevez (yellow card) 69'; Lichtsteiner (yellow card) 76'	Stadium: Santiago Bernabéu; Attendance: 78,153; Referee: Jonas Eriksson (Sweden)

===== Final =====
6 June 2015 Final	Juventus (Italy)	1–3	(Spain) Barcelona	Berlin, Germany
20:45 CEST (UTC+02:00)	Vidal (yellow card) 11'; Pogba (yellow card) 41'; Morata 55'	Report	Rakitić 4'; Suárez 68', (yellow card) 70'; Neymar 90+7'	Stadium: Olympiastadion; Attendance: 70,442; Referee: Cüneyt Çakır (Turkey)
