= 2014–15 Juventus FC season =

Italian football club season

Juventus
2014–15 season
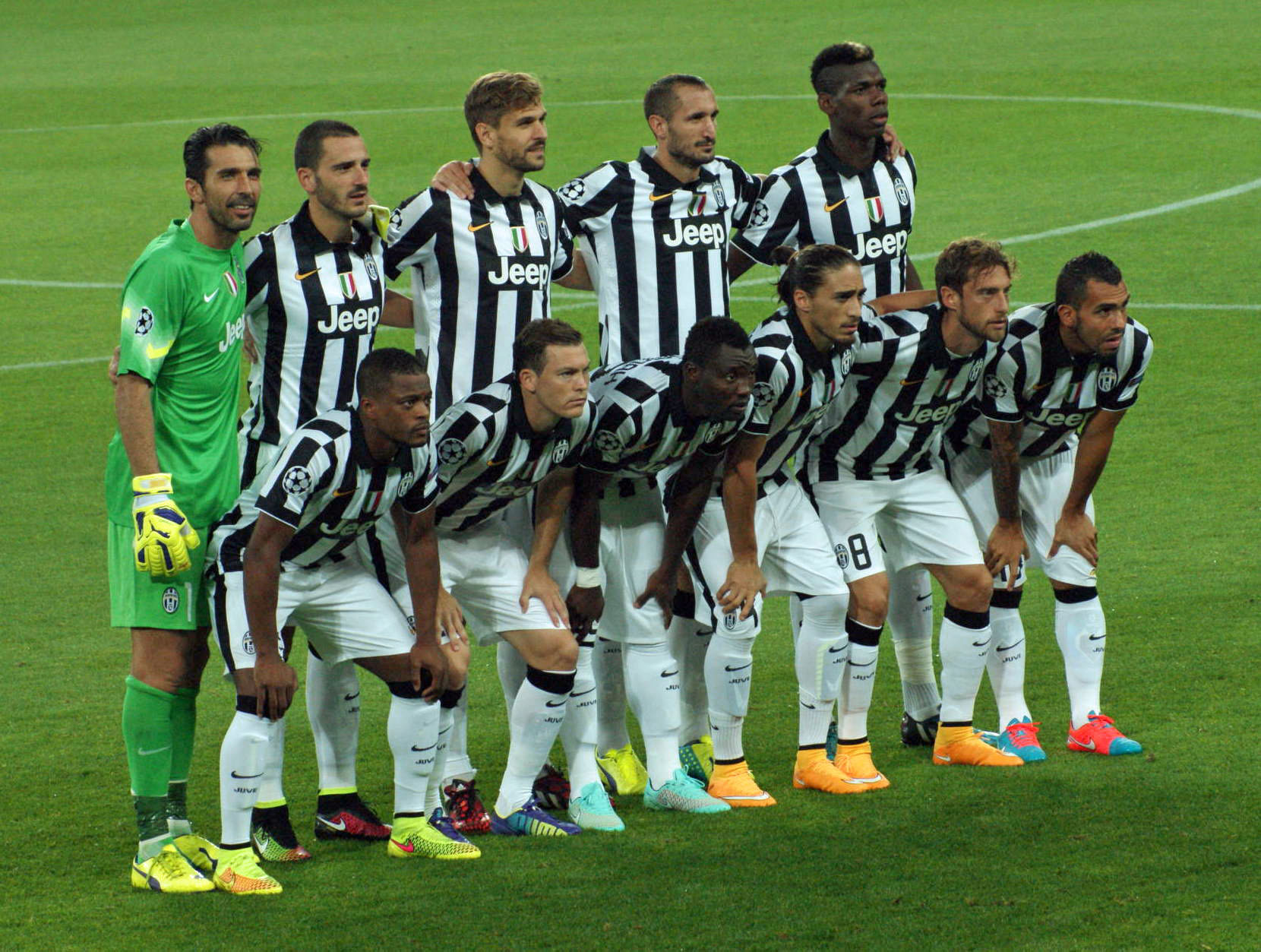
- Juventus Champions League line-up vs Malmö FF (September 2014)
- Chairman: Andrea Agnelli
- Head coach: Massimiliano Allegri
- Stadium: Juventus Stadium
- Serie A: 1st
- Coppa Italia: Winners
- Supercoppa Italiana: Runners-up
- UEFA Champions League: Runners-up
- Top goalscorer: League: Carlos Tevez (20); All: Carlos Tevez (29)
- Highest home attendance: 41,200 vs Roma (4 October 2014, Serie A)
- Lowest home attendance: 31,218 vs Malmö FF (16 September 2014, Champions League)
- Average home league attendance: 39,067
Home colours	Away colours	Third colours

The 2014–15 season was Juventus Football Club's 117th in existence and eighth consecutive season in the top flight of Italian football. The club competed for a treble, having won their fourth consecutive Serie A title in which they finished 17 points clear of second place Roma, and beat Lazio in the final of the Coppa Italia. However, they lost to Barcelona in the Champions League final, handing the Spanish club their second continental treble.

== Season review ==
After winning three consecutive domestic titles, Juventus and Antonio Conte would go on different paths, becoming the coach of the Italy national team. His place is taken from Massimiliano Allegri who, in 2011, won the Scudetto managing Milan. New signings for the 2014–15 season were Patrice Evra, Kingsley Coman and Álvaro Morata. Carlos Tevez was an integral part of the team as the club's leading scorer. Juventus lost the chance to gain the first seasonal trophy with a loss to Napoli in the 2014 Supercoppa Italiana on penalties after a 2–2 draw.

During the second part of season, Juventus retain the lead of Serie A reaching - at the same time - final step in both cups, domestic and continental. On 26 April 2015, Juventus lost 2–1 to Torino, their first defeat in the Derby della Mole since 1995. Six days later, beating Sampdoria away, the Bianconeri win the league title (fourth consecutive and 31st overall) with four games left to play. Between matchdays 36 and 37, Allegri also conquests the Coppa Italia with a 2–1 win over Lazio: the tenth win for Turin club in this competition; a new domestic record. Juventus finished the league with 17 points more than second-placed Roma, but fell as runners-up in Europe, losing 3–1 against Barcelona in the 2015 UEFA Champions League Final. The first half ended with an early Ivan Rakitić goal to give the advantage to the Spanish side, but Juventus were able to equalize after 10 minutes of the second half with a Morata goal. Barcelona then scored two more goals in the 68th minute by Luis Suárez, with the final goal coming during injury time.

== Club ==
=== Coaching staff ===
Position	Staff
Manager	(Italy) Massimiliano Allegri
Assistant coach	(Italy) Marco Landucci
First-team Coach	(Italy) Maurizio Trombetta
Goalkeepers' coach	(Italy) Claudio Filippi
Fitness coach	(Italy) Simeone Foletti
Head of Training Check	(Italy) Roberto Sassi
Physical therapy	(Italy) Stefano Grani

Source: Juventus.com

== Players ==
=== Squad information ===
Players and squad numbers last updated on 2 November 2014.
Note: Flags indicate national team as has been defined under FIFA eligibility rules. Players may hold more than one non-FIFA nationality.

No.	Player	Nat.	Position(s)	Date of birth (age at end of season)	Signed in	Contract ends	Signed from	Transfer fee	Apps.	Goals	Notes
Goalkeepers
1	Gianluigi Buffon	(Italy)	GK	28 January 1978 (aged 37)	2001	2017	(Italy) Parma	€45M	501	0	Captain
30	Marco Storari	(Italy)	GK	7 January 1977 (aged 38)	2010	2015	(Italy) Milan	€4.5M	54	0	
34	Rubinho	(Brazil)	GK	4 August 1982 (aged 32)	2012	2015	Unattached	Free	2	0	
Defenders
3	Giorgio Chiellini	(Italy)	CB / LB	14 August 1984 (aged 30)	2005	2018	(Italy) Fiorentina	€4.3M	333	28	Vice-captain
4	Martín Cáceres	(Uruguay)	CB / RB	7 April 1987 (aged 28)	2012	2016	(Spain) Sevilla	€8M	93	6	
5	Angelo Ogbonna	(Italy)	CB	23 May 1988 (aged 27)	2013	2018	(Italy) Torino	€13M	36	0	
15	Andrea Barzagli	(Italy)	CB	8 May 1981 (aged 34)	2011	2015	(Germany) VfL Wolfsburg	€0.3M	135	1	
17	Paolo De Ceglie	(Italy)	LB / LWB	17 September 1986 (aged 28)	2008	2015	(Italy) Youth Sector	€3.5M	–	–	
19	Leonardo Bonucci	(Italy)	CB	1 May 1987 (aged 28)	2010	2017	(Italy) Bari	€15.5M	186	8	
26	Stephan Lichtsteiner	(Switzerland)	RB / RWB	16 January 1984 (aged 31)	2011	2017	(Italy) Lazio	€10M	123	10	
33	Patrice Evra	(France)	LB	15 May 1981 (aged 34)	2014	2016	(England) Manchester United	€1.6M	6	1	
Midfielders
2	Rômulo	(Italy)	RWB / RW	22 May 1987 (aged 28)	2014	2015	(Italy) Hellas Verona	€1M	2	0	On loan
6	Paul Pogba	(France)	DM / CM	15 March 1993 (aged 22)	2012	2019	(England) Manchester United	Free	99	15	
7	Simone Pepe	(Italy)	LW / RW	31 August 1983 (aged 31)	2010	2015	(Italy) Udinese	€7.5M	80	11	
8	Claudio Marchisio	(Italy)	CM / AM	19 January 1986 (aged 29)	2006	2016	(Italy) Youth Sector	N/A	269	33	Vice-captain
20	Simone Padoin	(Italy)	RM / CM	18 March 1984 (aged 31)	2012	2016	(Italy) Atalanta	€4.5M	61	2	
21	Andrea Pirlo	(Italy)	CM / AM / DM	19 May 1979 (aged 36)	2011	2016	(Italy) Milan	Free	136	15	
22	Kwadwo Asamoah	(Ghana)	CM / LM / LWB	9 December 1988 (aged 26)	2012	2018	(Italy) Udinese	€9M	91	5	
23	Arturo Vidal	(Chile)	DM / CM	22 May 1987 (aged 28)	2011	2017	(Germany) Bayer Leverkusen	€10.5M	136	43	
27	Stefano Sturaro	(Italy)	CM	9 March 1993 (aged 22)	2014	2019	(Italy) Genoa	€5.5M	–	–	
37	Roberto Pereyra	(Argentina)	AM / LW	7 January 1991 (aged 24)	2014	2015	(Italy) Udinese	€1.5M	11	0	On loan
39	Luca Marrone	(Italy)	DM / CB	28 March 1990 (aged 25)	2014	2019	(Italy) Sassuolo	€5M	23	1	
Forwards
9	Álvaro Morata	(Spain)	ST / CF	23 October 1992 (aged 22)	2014	2019	(Spain) Real Madrid	€20M	9	2	
10	Carlos Tevez	(Argentina)	ST / CF	5 February 1984 (aged 31)	2013	2016	(England) Manchester City	€9M	62	31	
11	Kingsley Coman	(France)	AM / CF	13 June 1996 (aged 19)	2014	2019	(France) Paris Saint-Germain	Free	4	0	
14	Fernando Llorente	(Spain)	ST / CF	26 February 1985 (aged 30)	2013	2017	(Spain) Athletic Bilbao	Free	56	19	
32	Alessandro Matri	(Italy)	ST / CF	19 August 1984 (aged 30)	2015	2015	(Italy) Milan		0	0	On loan

== Transfers ==
=== In ===
Date	Pos.	Player	Age	Moving from	Fee	Notes	Source
3 July 2014	MF	(Italy) Luca Marrone	24	(Italy) Sassuolo	€5M	Co-ownership Resolution	
7 July 2014	FW	(France) Kingsley Coman	18	(France) Paris Saint-Germain	Free		
19 July 2014	FW	(Spain) Álvaro Morata	21	(Spain) Real Madrid	€20M		
23 July 2014	DF	(France) Patrice Evra	33	(England) Manchester United	€1M		
25 July 2014	MF	(Argentina) Roberto Pereyra	23	(Italy) Udinese	€1.5M	On Loan until June 2015	
2 August 2014	MF	(Italy) Rômulo	27	(Italy) Hellas Verona	€1M	On Loan until June 2015	
30 January 2015	DF	(Italy) Paolo De Ceglie	27	(Italy) Parma		Return from loan	
2 February 2015	FW	(Italy) Alessandro Matri	30	(Italy) Milan		On loan until June 2015	
2 February 2015	MF	(Italy) Stefano Sturaro	21	(Italy) Genoa	€5.5M	Co-Ownership Resolution/Loan Recall	

=== Out ===
Date	Pos.	Player	Age	Moving to	Fee	Notes	Source
3 February 2015	MF	(Italy) Federico Mattiello	19	(Italy) Chievo		On loan	
2 February 2015	FW	(Italy) Sebastian Giovinco	28	(Canada) Toronto FC	Free		
7 August 2014	MF	(Chile) Mauricio Isla	26	(England) Queens Park Rangers	€1.2M	On loan	
18 July 2014	FW	(Italy) Fabio Quagliarella	31	(Italy) Torino	€3.5M		
4 July 2014	FW	(Montenegro) Mirko Vučinić	30	(United Arab Emirates) Al Jazira	€6.3M		
3 July 2014	DF	(Italy) Federico Peluso	30	(Italy) Sassuolo	€4.5M		
30 June 2014	FW	(Italy) Dani Osvaldo	28	(England) Southampton	Free	Loan return	

=== Other acquisitions ===
Date	Pos.	Player	Age	Moving from	Ownership	Fee	Loaned to	Source
2 February 2015	FW	(Italy) Andrea Favilli	17	(Italy) Livorno	On loan with buy-out option	€0.15M	-	
2 February 2015	DF	(Italy) Daniele Rugani	20	(Italy) Empoli	Co-ownership Resolution	€3.5M	(Italy) Empoli	
31 December 2014	GK	(Italy) Alberto Brignoli	23	(Italy) Ternana	Full Ownership	€1.75M	(Italy) Ternana	
31 December 2014	GK	(Italy) Cristian Bunino	18	(Italy) Pro Vercelli	Full Ownership	€1.75M	(Italy) Pro Vercelli	
31 December 2014	FW	(Italy) Francesco Cassata	17	(Italy) Empoli	Full Ownership	€1.5M	-	
30 December 2014	FW	(Italy) Stefano Beltrame	21	(Italy) Sampdoria	Co-ownership Resolution	€1M	(Italy) Modena	
30 December 2014	GK	(Romania) Laurențiu Brănescu	20	(Italy) Virtus Lanciano	Co-ownership Resolution	€1.2M	(Hungary) Haladás	
29 August 2014	FW	(Italy) Valerio Rosseti	20	(Italy) Siena	Full Ownership	Free	(Italy) Atalanta	
24 July 2014	DF	(Iceland) Hörður Magnússon	21	(Italy) Spezia	Co-ownership Resolution	€1M	(Italy) Cesena	
23 July 2014	DF	(France) Patrice Evra	33	(England) Manchester United	Full Ownership	€1.5M	-	
19 July 2014	FW	(Spain) Álvaro Morata	21	(Spain) Real Madrid	Full Ownership	€20M	-	
7 July 2014	MF	(France) Kingsley Coman	18	(France) Paris Saint-Germain	Full Ownership	Free	-	
3 July 2014	MF	(Italy) Luca Marrone	24	(Italy) Sassuolo	Co-ownership Resolution	€5M	-	
1 July 2014	MF	(Italy) Stefano Sturaro	21	(Italy) Genoa	Co-ownership Resolution	€5.5M	-	
30 June 2014	DF	(Italy) Nazzareno Belfasti	20	(Italy) Pro Vercelli	Co-ownership Resolution	€0.5M	(Italy) FeralpiSalò	
30 June 2014	MF	(Spain) Nico Hidalgo	22	(Spain) Granada	Full Ownership	€2M	(Spain) Granada	
30 June 2014	DF	(Spain) Marcelo Djaló	20	(Spain) Granada	Full Ownership	€1M	(Spain) Granada	
20 June 2014	GK	(Italy) Carlo Pinsoglio	24	(Italy) Vicenza	Co-ownership Resolution	€0.7M	(Italy) Modena	
20 June 2014	MF	(Australia) James Troisi	25	(Italy) Atalanta	Co-ownership Resolution	€1M	(Belgium) Zulte Waregem	
20 June 2014	FW	(Italy) Cristian Pasquato	24	(Italy) Udinese	Co-ownership Resolution	€1.5M	(Italy) Pescara	
20 June 2014	DF	(Chile) Mauricio Isla	26	(Italy) Udinese	Co-ownership Resolution	€4.5M	(England) Queens Park Rangers	
19 June 2014	DF	(Denmark) Frederik Sørensen	22	(Italy) Bologna	Co-ownership Resolution	€0.8M	(Italy) Verona	
18 June 2014	GK	(Italy) Alberto Gallinetta	22	(Italy) Parma	Co-ownership Resolution	€0.7M	(Slovenia) ND Gorica	
18 June 2014	DF	(Italy) Stefano Pellizzari	17	(Italy) Cesena	Co-ownership Resolution	€0.75M	-	

Total expenditure: €57,150,000

=== Other disposals ===
Date	Pos.	Player	Age	Moving to	Type	Fee	Source
3 February 2015	MF	(Italy) Stefano Antezza	19	(Italy) Spezia	Full Ownership		
2 February 2015	FW	(Italy) Sebastian Giovinco	28	(Canada) Toronto FC	Contract Termination	Free	
30 December 2014	DF	(Italy) Marco Motta	28	(England) Watford	Contract Termination	Free	
30 December 2014	MF	(Italy) Luca Castiglia	25	(Italy) Pro Vercelli	Full Ownership	€1.5M	
30 December 2014	MF	(Italy) Elio De Silvestro	21	(Italy) Virtus Lanciano	Full Ownership	€1.2M	
30 December 2014	MF	(Slovakia) Jakub Hromada	18	(Italy) Sampdoria	Full Ownership	€0.6M	
30 December 2014	DF	(Italy) Francesco Mestre	17	(Italy) Empoli	Full Ownership	€0.9M	
30 December 2014	DF	(Italy) Luigi Rizzo	17	(Italy) Vicenza	Full Ownership	€0.6M	
30 December 2014	DF	(Italy) Luca Santomauro	17	(Italy) Empoli	Full Ownership	€0.6M	
30 December 2014	DF	(Slovakia) Atila Varga	18	(Italy) Sampdoria	Full Ownership	€0.4M	
30 December 2014	FW	(Italy) Manolo Gabbiadini	23	(Italy) Napoli	Co-ownership Termination	€6.25M	
30 December 2014	DF	(Italy) Alberto Masi	22	(Italy) Ternana	Co-ownership Termination	€1.5M	
30 December 2014	MF	(Italy) Giuseppe Ruggiero	21	(Italy) Pro Vercelli	Co-ownership Termination	€0.25M	
20 August 2014	DF	(Switzerland) Reto Ziegler	28	(Switzerland) Sion	Contract Termination		
18 July 2014	FW	(Italy) Fabio Quagliarella	31	(Italy) Torino	Full Ownership	€3.5M	
4 July 2014	FW	(Montenegro) Mirko Vučinić	30	(United Arab Emirates) Al Jazira	Full Ownership	€6.3M	
3 July 2014	DF	(Italy) Federico Peluso	30	(Italy) Sassuolo	Full Ownership	€4.5M	
30 June 2014	GK	(Albania) Entonjo Elezaj	17	(Italy) Pro Vercelli	Full Ownership	€0.5M	
20 June 2014	FW	(Italy) Niko Bianconi	22	(Italy) Vicenza	Co-ownership Termination	€0.6M	
20 June 2014	FW	(Italy) Simone Zaza	22	(Italy) Sassuolo	Co-ownership Termination	€7.5M	
20 June 2014	DF	(France) Prince Gouano	20	(Italy) Atalanta	Co-ownership Termination	€1M	
18 June 2014	FW	(Italy) Gabriele Moncini	18	(Italy) Cesena	Co-ownership Termination	€0.75M	
18 June 2014	MF	(Italy) Filippo Boniperti	22	(Italy) Parma	Co-ownership Termination	€0.7M	
18 June 2014	FW	(Italy) Ciro Immobile	24	(Italy) Torino	Co-ownership Termination	€8M	

Total revenue: €46,150,000

Net income: ▼€11,000,000

=== On loan ===
Date	Pos.	Player	Age	Loaned to	Loan fee	Notes	Loan expiry	Source
3 February 2015	GK	(Italy) Francesco Anacoura	20	(Italy) Pontedera		Co-owned with (Italy) Parma		
3 February 2015	GK	(Romania) Laurențiu Brănescu	20	(Hungary) Haladás				
3 February 2015	GK	(Italy) Alberto Brignoli	23	(Italy) Ternana				
	GK	(Italy) Leonardo Citti	31	(Italy) Gubbio				
19 June 2014	GK	(Italy) Vincenzo Fiorillo	24	(Italy) Pescara		Co-owned with (Italy) Sampdoria		
18 June 2014	GK	(Italy) Alberto Gallinetta	22	(Slovenia) ND Gorica				}
7 July 2014	GK	(Italy) Nicola Leali	21	(Italy) Cesena				
25 July 2014	GK	(Italy) Timothy Nocchi	24	(Italy) Spezia			30 June 2015	
20 June 2014	GK	(Italy) Carlo Pinsoglio	24	(Italy) Modena				
	GK	(Italy) Gianmarco Vannucchi	18	(Italy) Renate				
	DF	(Spain) Pol García	19	(Italy) Vicenza				
	DF	(Senegal) Ahmed Rassoul Gueye	18	(Italy) Reggiana				
	DF	(Italy) Luca Barlocco	19	(Italy) Como		Co-owned with Atalanta		
	DF	(Italy) Nazzareno Belfasti	21	(Italy) FeralpiSalò				
	DF	(Spain) Nicolas Cainzares	18	(Spain) Rayo Vallecano				
	DF	(Italy) Nicolò Curti	19	(Italy) Como				
	DF	(Spain) Marcelo Djaló	32	(Spain) Granada				
	DF	(Italy) Edoardo Goldaniga	20	(Italy) Perugia		Co-owned with (Italy) Palermo		
	DF	(Chile) Mauricio Isla	26	(England) Queens Park Rangers	€1.2M			
	DF	(Italy) Matteo Liviero	21	(Italy) Pro Vercelli				
	DF	(Iceland) Hörður Magnússon	21	(Italy) Cesena				
	DF	(Romania) Vlad Marin	19	(Italy) Messina				
3 February 2015	DF	(Italy) Federico Mattiello	19	(Italy) Chievo			30 June 2015	
	DF	(Italy) Stefano Pellizzari	18	(Italy) Virtus Entella				
	DF	(Italy) Filippo Penna	19	(Netherlands) Den Bosch				
2 February 2015	DF	(Italy) Daniele Rugani	20	(Italy) Empoli			30 June 2015	
	DF	(Denmark) Frederik Sørensen	22	(Italy) Hellas Verona				
	DF	(Italy) Christian Tavanti	19	(Italy) Mantova				
	DF	(Switzerland) Joel Untersee	20	(Liechtenstein) Vaduz				
	MF	(Italy) Eros Castelletto	19	(Italy) Gubbio				
	MF	(Italy) Matteo Gerbaudo	19	(Italy) SPAL				
	MF	(Lithuania) Vykintas Slivka	19	(Slovenia) ND Gorica				
	MF	(Brazil) Gabriel Appelt	21	(Italy) Livorno				
	MF	(Netherlands) Ouasim Bouy	21	(Greece) Panathinaikos				
	MF	(Liechtenstein) Marcel Büchel	23	(Italy) Bologna				
17 July 2014	MF	(Italy) Michele Cavion	19	(Italy) FeralpiSalò				
17 July 2014	MF	(Italy) Marco Di Benedetto	18	(Italy) FeralpiSalò				
	MF	(Italy) Simone Emmanuello	20	(Italy) Pro Vercelli		Co-owned with (Italy) Atalanta		
	MF	(Italy) Carlo Ilari	22	(Italy) Catanzaro				
	MF	(Albania) Elvis Kabashi	22	(Netherlands) Den Bosch				
	MF	(Italy) Fausto Rossi	23	(Spain) Córdoba				
	MF	(Italy) Andrea Schiavone	21	(Italy) Modena				
	FW	(Italy) Domenico Berardi	19	(Italy) Sassuolo				
	FW	(Italy) Edoardo Ceria	19	(Netherlands) Den Bosch		Co-owned with (Italy) Atalanta		
	FW	(Greece) Anastasios Donis	18	(Italy) Sassuolo				
	MF	(Spain) Nico Hidalgo	22	(Spain) Granada				
	MF	(Uruguay) Jorge Andrés Martínez	22	(Uruguay) CA Juventud				
	FW	(Spain) Hector Otin Lafuente	18	(Italy) Virtus Entella				
20 June 2014	FW	(Italy) Simone Russini	18	(Italy) Ternana		Co-owned with (Italy) Ternana		
2 February 2015	FW	(Italy) Simone Russini	18	(Italy) Paganese		Co-owned with (Italy) Ternana		
	DF	(Italy) Leonardo Spinazzola	21	(Italy) Vicenza				
	MF	(Australia) James Troisi	25	(Belgium) Zulte Waregem				
	FW	(Senegal) Mame Thiam	21	(Italy) Virtus Lanciano		Co-owned with (Italy) Virtus Lanciano		
18 July 2014	FW	(Italy) Stefano Beltrame	21	(Italy) Modena				
	FW	(Ghana) Richmond Boakye	21	(Italy) Atalanta		Co-owned with (Italy) Atalanta		
2 February 2015	FW	(Italy) Cristian Bunino	18	(Italy) Pro Vercelli				
	FW	(Italy) Davide Cais	20	(Italy) Gubbio		Co-owned with (Italy) Atalanta		
	FW	(Senegal) Mbaye Diagne	23	(Belgium) Westerlo				
	FW	(Switzerland) Zoran Josipovic	18	(Switzerland) Lugano				
	FW	(Italy) Eric Lanini	20	(Italy) Virtus Entella		Co-owned with (Italy) Palermo		
	FW	(Italy) Alberto Libertazzi	22	(Italy) Pontedera		Co-owned with (Italy) Novara		
14 August 2014	FW	(Italy) Francesco Margiotta	21	(Italy) Monza				
14 January 2015	FW	(Italy) Francesco Margiotta	21	(Italy) Real Vicenza				
	FW	(Italy) Stefano Padovan	20	(Italy) Crotone				
	FW	(Italy) Cristian Pasquato	24	(Italy) Pescara				
	FW	(Italy) Valerio Rosseti	19	(Italy) Atalanta				

== Pre-season and friendlies ==
25 July 2014 Friendly	Juventus	2–3	Lucento	Turin
16:00 CEST (UTC+02:00)	Llorente 32', 35'	Report	Coppo 11'; Cavazzi 74'; Cretazzo 86'	Stadium: Juventus Center

30 July 2014 Trofeo Lugaresi	Cesena	0–0	Juventus	Cesena
20:45 CEST (UTC+02:00)		Report		Stadium: Stadio Dino Manuzzi; Referee: Maurizio Mariani

6 August 2014 Friendly	ISL All Stars	1–8	Juventus	Jakarta, Indonesia
20:00 WIB (UTC+07:00)	Lopičić 3'	Report	Pirlo 4' (pen.); Llorente 16', 21', 22'; Giovinco 34'; Coman 66'; Tevez 69'; Pepe 90'	Stadium: Gelora Bung Karno Stadium; Attendance: ~80,000; Referee: Thoriq Alkatiri

10 August 2014 Friendly	A-League All Stars	2–3	Juventus	Sydney, Australia
19:30 AEST (UTC+10:00)	Carrusca 9'; Juric 77'	Report	Llorente 59'; Pogba 88'; Pepe 90+3'	Stadium: ANZ Stadium; Referee: Felix Brych (Germany)

13 August 2014 Friendly	Newcastle Jets	0–1	Juventus	Carlton, Australia
19:00 AEST (UTC+10:00)		Report	Giovinco 26'	Stadium: Jubilee Oval; Attendance: 0 (Behind closed doors)

16 August 2014 Friendly	Singapore Selection	0–5	Juventus	Kallang, Singapore
UTC+08:00	Rahman (yellow card) 35'; Hamzah (yellow card) 43'	Report	Pirlo 17', 43' (pen.); Pogba 48'; Giovinco 55'; Asamoah 71'; Pepe (yellow card) 85'	Stadium: New National Stadium; Attendance: 27,338; Referee: Muhd Taqi

20 August 2014 Friendly	Juventus	6–1	Juventus Primavera	Villar Perosa
17:00 CEST (UTC+02:00)	Tevez 2', 11'; Lichtsteiner 37'; Pereyra 43'; Vitale 44'; Buenacasa 60'	Report	Roussos 9'

23 August 2014 TIM Trophy	Juventus	0–1	Milan	Reggio Emilia
20:40 CEST (UTC+02:00)			Honda 30'	Stadium: Mapei Stadium – Città del Tricolore

23 August 2014 TIM Trophy	Juventus	1–0	Sassuolo	Reggio Emilia
21:40 CEST (UTC+02:00)	Pereyra 43'			Stadium: Mapei Stadium – Città del Tricolore

== Competitions ==
=== Supercoppa Italiana ===
22 December 2014 Final	Juventus	2–2 (a.e.t.) (5–6 p)	Napoli	Doha, Qatar
18:30 CET (UTC+01:00)	Tevez 5', 106', (yellow card) 109'; Pereyra (yellow card) 69'	Report	Higuaín (yellow card) 45+1', (goal) 68', 118'; Callejón (yellow card) 76'; Albiol (yellow card) 80'; Mertens (yellow card) 83'; Ghoulam (yellow card) 105'	Stadium: Jassim Bin Hamad Stadium; Attendance: 14,000; Referee: Paolo Valeri
	Penalties
	Tevez (penalty missed); Vidal (penalty scored); Pogba (penalty scored); Marchisio (penalty scored); Morata (penalty scored); Bonucci (penalty scored); Chiellini (penalty missed); Pereyra (penalty missed); Padoin (penalty missed)		(penalty missed) Jorginho; (penalty scored) Ghoulam; (penalty scored) Albiol; (penalty scored) Inler; (penalty scored) Higuaín; (penalty scored) Gargano; (penalty missed) Mertens; (penalty missed) Callejón; (penalty scored) Koulibaly

=== Serie A ===
==== League table ====
Pos	Team	Pld	W	D	L	GF	GA	GD	Pts	Qualification or relegation
1	Juventus (C)	38	26	9	3	72	24	+48	87	Qualification for the Champions League group stage
2	Roma	38	19	13	6	54	31	+23	70	Qualification for the Champions League group stage
3	Lazio	38	21	6	11	71	38	+33	69	Qualification for the Champions League play-off round
4	Fiorentina	38	18	10	10	61	46	+15	64	Qualification for the Europa League group stage (Note: Since the winners of the 2014–15 Coppa Italia (Juventus) qualified for European competition based on league position, the spot awarded to the cup winners (Europa League group stage) was passed to the fifth-placed team and the spot originally meant for the fifth-placed team (Europa League third qualifying round) was given to the highest placed team that has obtained an UEFA licence and not already qualified for European competition.)
5	Napoli	38	18	9	11	70	54	+16	63	Qualification for the Europa League group stage

Source: 2014–15 Serie A, 2014-15 Serie A classification.
Rules for classification: 1) points; 2) head-to-head points; 3) head-to-head goal difference; 4) goal difference; 5) number of goals scored; 6) draw. (Head-to-head record is applied for clubs with the same number of points only once all matches between said clubs have been played.).
(C) Champions

==== Results summary ====
Overall								Home						Away					
Pld	W	D	L	GF	GA	GD	Pts	W	D	L	GF	GA	GD	W	D	L	GF	GA	GD
38	26	9	3	72	24	+48	87	16	3	0	45	11	+34	10	6	3	27	13	+14

Source: Competitive matches

==== Results by round ====
Round	1	2	3	4	5	6	7	8	9	10	11	12	13	14	15	16	17	18	19	20	21	22	23	24	25	26	27	28	29	30	31	32	33	34	35	36	37	38
Ground	A	H	A	H	A	H	A	H	A	A	H	A	H	A	H	A	H	A	H	H	A	H	A	H	A	H	A	H	H	A	H	A	H	A	H	A	H	A
Result	W	W	W	W	W	W	D	W	L	W	W	W	W	D	D	W	D	W	W	W	D	W	D	W	D	W	W	W	W	L	W	L	W	W	D	W	W	D
Position	6	2	2	1	1	1	1	1	1	1	1	1	1	1	1	1	1	1	1	1	1	1	1	1	1	1	1	1	1	1	1	1	1	1	1	1	1	1

Source: Competitive matches
A = Away; H = Home; W = Win; D = Draw; L = Loss

==== Matches ====
30 August 2014 1	Chievo	0–1	Juventus	Verona
18:00 CEST (UTC+02:00)	Mangani (yellow card) 30'; Dainelli (yellow card) 57'	Report	Biraghi 6' (o.g.); Vidal (yellow card) 29'	Stadium: Stadio Marc'Antonio Bentegodi; Attendance: 25,000; Referee: Carmine Russo

13 September 2014 2	Juventus	2–0	Udinese	Turin
20:45 CEST (UTC+02:00)	Tevez 8'; Marchisio 75'	Report	Pasquale (yellow card) 40'	Stadium: Juventus Stadium; Attendance: 38,217; Referee: Antonio Damato

20 September 2014 3	Milan	0–1	Juventus	Milan
20:45 CEST (UTC+02:00)	Muntari (yellow card) 84'; Torres (yellow card) 90+1'	Report	Marchisio (yellow card) 42'; Ogbonna (yellow card) 63'; Tevez 71'; Asamoah (yellow card) 90+1'	Stadium: San Siro; Attendance: 78,681; Referee: Nicola Rizzoli

24 September 2014 4	Juventus	3–0	Cesena	Turin
20:45 CEST (UTC+02:00)	Vidal 18' (pen.), 64'; Lichtsteiner 85'	Report	Cascione (yellow card) 17'; Capelli (yellow card) 31'; Perico (yellow card) 51'	Stadium: Juventus Stadium; Attendance: 36,556; Referee: Piero Giacomelli

27 September 2014 5	Atalanta	0–3	Juventus	Bergamo
20:45 CEST (UTC+02:00)	Benalouane (yellow card) 20'; Denis (penalty missed) 59'; Molina (yellow card) 73'	Report	Marchisio (yellow card) 30'; Tevez 35', 59'; Chiellini (yellow card) 58'; Evra (yellow card) 74'; Morata 83'	Stadium: Stadio Atleti Azzurri d'Italia; Attendance: 22,074; Referee: Daniele Orsato

5 October 2014 6	Juventus	3–2	Roma	Turin
18:00 CEST (UTC+02:00)	Tevez 27' (pen.), 45+3' (pen.), (yellow card) 90+3'; Chiellini (yellow card) 30'; Lichtsteiner (yellow card) 31'; Bonucci (yellow card) 32', (goal) 86'; Morata (red card) 88'	Report	Maicon (yellow card) 26'; Totti 32' (pen.), (yellow card) 32'; Gervinho (yellow card) 40'; Iturbe 44'; Manolas (red card) 89'	Stadium: Juventus Stadium; Attendance: 41,200; Referee: Gianluca Rocchi

18 October 2014 7	Sassuolo	1–1	Juventus	Reggio Emilia
20:45 CEST (UTC+02:00)	Zaza 13', (yellow card) 38'; Acerbi (yellow card) 87'	Report	Pogba 19', (yellow card) 50'; Bonucci (yellow card) 90+3'; Padoin (red card) 90+6'	Stadium: Mapei Stadium – Città del Tricolore; Attendance: 21,584; Referee: Luca Banti
Note: Simone Padoin was sent off for dissent while a substitute.

26 October 2014 8	Juventus	2–0	Palermo	Turin
15:00 CET (UTC+01:00)	Vidal 32', (yellow card) 79'; Marchisio (yellow card) 60'; Llorente 64'	Report	Barreto (yellow card) 50'	Stadium: Juventus Stadium; Attendance: 39,240; Referee: Gianpaolo Calvarese

29 October 2014 9	Genoa	1–0	Juventus	Genoa
20:45 CET (UTC+01:00)	Greco (yellow card) 73'; De Maio (yellow card) 88'; Antonini 90+4'	Report	Ogbonna (yellow card) 16'; Vidal (yellow card) 44'; Chiellini (yellow card) 58'; Lichtsteiner (yellow card) 90+2'	Stadium: Stadio Luigi Ferraris; Attendance: 21,971; Referee: Paolo Mazzoleni

1 November 2014 10	Empoli	0–2	Juventus	Empoli
18:00 CET (UTC+01:00)	Tonelli (yellow card) 60' (red card) 90+5'; Hysaj (yellow card) 90+2'	Report	Vidal (yellow card) 53'; Pirlo 61'; Morata 72'	Stadium: Stadio Carlo Castellani; Attendance: 14,698; Referee: Paolo Valeri

9 November 2014 11	Juventus	7–0	Parma	Turin
15:00 CET (UTC+01:00)	Llorente 23', 36'; Lichtsteiner 29'; Tevez 49', 58'; Morata 76', 88'	Report	Acquah (yellow card) 73'	Stadium: Juventus Stadium; Attendance: 39,097; Referee: Carmine Russo

22 November 2014 12	Lazio	0–3	Juventus	Rome
20:45 CET (UTC+01:00)	Basta (yellow card) 49'; Lulić (yellow card) 74'	Report	Pogba 24', 64'; Padoin (yellow card) 36' (yellow-red card) 70'; Lichtsteiner (yellow card) 52'; Tevez 55'; Bonucci (yellow card) 67'	Stadium: Stadio Olimpico; Attendance: 42,044; Referee: Antonio Damato

30 November 2014 13	Juventus	2–1	Torino	Turin
18:00 CET (UTC+01:00)	Vidal 15' (pen.); Pogba (yellow card) 59'; Lichtsteiner (yellow card) 71' (yellow-red card) 78'; Pirlo 90+3'	Report	Glik (yellow card) 17'; Peres 22'; Gazzi (yellow card) 46'; Amauri (yellow card) 71'; Moretti (yellow card) 90+1'	Stadium: Juventus Stadium; Attendance: 39,938; Referee: Daniele Orsato

5 December 2014 14	Fiorentina	0–0	Juventus	Florence
20:45 CET (UTC+01:00)	Pizarro (yellow card) 28'; Cuadrado (yellow card) 40'	Report	Ogbonna (yellow card) 35'; Chiellini (yellow card) 37'; Pogba (yellow card) 58'	Stadium: Stadio Artemio Franchi; Attendance: 38,160; Referee: Nicola Rizzoli

14 December 2014 15	Juventus	1–1	Sampdoria	Turin
12:30 CET (UTC+01:00)	Evra 12'; Vidal (yellow card) 49'; Bonucci (yellow card) 66'	Report	Regini (yellow card) 10'; Gabbiadini 51', (yellow card) 59'; Romagnoli (yellow card) 54'; Okaka (yellow card) 71'; Romero (yellow card) 90+2'	Stadium: Juventus Stadium; Attendance: 40,541; Referee: Daniele Doveri

18 December 2014 16	Cagliari	1–3	Juventus	Cagliari
19:00 CET (UTC+01:00)	Rossettini (yellow card) 33', (goal) 65'; Capuano (yellow card) 49'; Avelar (yellow card) 69'; Ceppitelli (yellow card) 90+2'	Report	Tevez 3'; Vidal 15'; Llorente 50'	Stadium: Stadio Sant'Elia; Attendance: 16,074; Referee: Paolo Mazzoleni

6 January 2015 17	Juventus	1–1	Internazionale	Turin
21:00 CET (UTC+01:00)	Tevez 5'; Morata (yellow card) 71'; Bonucci (yellow card) 82'	Report	Icardi 64', (yellow card) 66'; Ranocchia (yellow card) 67'; D'Ambrosio (yellow card) 74'; Juan Jesus (yellow card) 80'; Medel (yellow card) 84'; Kovačić (red card) 86'	Stadium: Juventus Stadium; Attendance: 40,015; Referee: Luca Banti

11 January 2015 18	Napoli	1–3	Juventus	Naples
20:45 CET (UTC+01:00)	Britos 64', (yellow card) 68'; De Guzmán (yellow card) 85'; Albiol (yellow card) 90+1'; Zapata (yellow card) 90+2'	Report	Pogba 29'; Tevez (yellow card) 39'; Cáceres (yellow card) 61', (goal) 69'; Vidal 90+4'	Stadium: Stadio San Paolo; Attendance: 53,006; Referee: Paolo Tagliavento

18 January 2015 19	Juventus	4–0	Hellas Verona	Turin
20:45 CET (UTC+01:00)	Pogba 3'; Tevez 7', 74'; Pereyra 66'	Report	Greco (yellow card) 47'; Rodríguez (yellow card) 79'	Stadium: Juventus Stadium; Attendance: 36,722; Referee: Massimiliano Irrati

25 January 2015 20	Juventus	2–0	Chievo	Turin
15:00 CET (UTC+01:00)	Vidal (yellow card) 15'; Marchisio (yellow card) 58'; Pogba 60'; Lichtsteiner 73'	Report	Zukanović (yellow card) 20'; Frey (yellow card) 27'; Dainelli (yellow card) 45+3'; Schelotto (yellow card) 45+5'	Stadium: Juventus Stadium; Attendance: 39,045; Referee: Davide Massa

1 February 2015 21	Udinese	0–0	Juventus	Udine
15:00 CET (UTC+01:00)	Di Natale (yellow card) 87'; Théréau (yellow card) 90+3'	Report	Lichtsteiner (yellow card) 83'	Stadium: Stadio Friuli; Attendance: 11,241; Referee: Andrea Gervasoni

7 February 2015 22	Juventus	3–1	Milan	Turin
20:45 CET (UTC+01:00)	Tevez 14', (yellow card) 90'; Bonucci 31'; Padoin (yellow card) 60'; Morata 65'	Report	Antonelli 28'; Essien (yellow card) 34'	Stadium: Juventus Stadium; Attendance: 40,123; Referee: Antonio Damato

15 February 2015 23	Cesena	2–2	Juventus	Cesena
20:45 CET (UTC+01:00)	Đurić 17'; Perico (yellow card) 20'; Brienza 70'; Nica (yellow card) 88'	Report	Morata 27'; Marchisio 33'; Lichtsteiner (yellow card) 41'; Bonucci (yellow card) 69'; Vidal (penalty missed) 82'	Stadium: Stadio Dino Manuzzi; Attendance: 23,661; Referee: Carmine Russo

20 February 2015 24	Juventus	2–1	Atalanta	Turin
20:45 CET (UTC+01:00)	Llorente 39'; Pirlo 45'; Marchisio (yellow card) 55'; Padoin (yellow card) 60'; Pereyra (yellow card) 85'; Lichtsteiner (yellow card) 87'; Morata (yellow card) 90+3'	Report	Migliaccio 25', (yellow card) 89'; Baselli (yellow card) 43'; Bellini (yellow card) 81'	Stadium: Juventus Stadium; Attendance: 37,195; Referee: Massimiliano Irrati

2 March 2015 25	Roma	1–1	Juventus	Rome
21:00 CET (UTC+01:00)	Torosidis (yellow card) 19' (yellow-red card) 62'; De Rossi (yellow card) 32'; Pjanić (yellow card) 57'; Yanga-Mbiwa (yellow card) 60'; Keita 78'; Nainggolan (yellow card) 79'	Report	Evra (yellow card) 41'; Morata (yellow card) 54'; Tevez 64'; Marchisio (yellow card) 71'; Chiellini (yellow card) 77'; Vidal (yellow card) 84'	Stadium: Stadio Olimpico; Attendance: 55,651; Referee: Daniele Orsato

9 March 2015 26	Juventus	1–0	Sassuolo	Turin
21:00 CET (UTC+01:00)	Tevez (yellow card) 37'; Pogba (yellow card) 78', (goal) 82'	Report	Missiroli (yellow card) 26'; Sansone (yellow card) 68'; Magnanelli (yellow card) 80'; Zaza (yellow card) 90+2'	Stadium: Juventus Stadium; Attendance: 37,643; Referee: Sebastiano Peruzzo

14 March 2015 27	Palermo	0–1	Juventus	Palermo
18:00 CET (UTC+01:00)	Vázquez (yellow card) 39'; Anđelković (yellow card) 41'; Dybala (yellow card) 87'	Report	Barzagli (yellow card) 52'; Morata 70', (yellow card) 80'; Lichtsteiner (yellow card) 84'; Pereyra (yellow card) 90'	Stadium: Stadio Renzo Barbera; Attendance: 29,832; Referee: Marco Guida

22 March 2015 28	Juventus	1–0	Genoa	Turin
15:00 CET (UTC+01:00)	Tevez 25' (penalty missed) 62'; Bonucci (yellow card) 49'	Report	Perotti (yellow card) 14'; Bertolacci (yellow card) 23'; Borriello (yellow card) 49'; Roncaglia (yellow card) 61'	Stadium: Juventus Stadium; Attendance: 39,919; Referee: Marco Di Bello

4 April 2015 29	Juventus	2–0	Empoli	Turin
21:00 CEST (UTC+02:00)	Tevez 43', (yellow card) 48'; Barzagli (yellow card) 89'; Pereyra 90+4'	Report	Mário Rui (yellow card) 66'; Saponara (yellow card) 78'	Stadium: Juventus Stadium; Attendance: 40,029; Referee: Piero Giacomelli

11 April 2015 30	Parma	1–0	Juventus	Parma
18:00 CEST (UTC+02:00)	Mendes (yellow card) 52'; Mauri 60'; Jorquera (yellow card) 77'; Gobbi (yellow card) 89'	Report	Marchisio (yellow card) 45'; Chiellini (yellow card) 51'; Ogbonna (yellow card) 88'	Stadium: Stadio Ennio Tardini; Attendance: 15,311; Referee: Andrea Gervasoni

18 April 2015 31	Juventus	2–0	Lazio	Turin
20:45 CEST (UTC+02:00)	Tevez 17'; Bonucci 28'; Evra (yellow card) 50'; Marchisio (yellow card) 59'; Chiellini (yellow card) 63'	Report	Maurício (yellow card) 45+2'; Lulić (yellow card) 45+5'; Candreva (yellow card) 60'; Cana (yellow card) 68'; Cataldi (red card) 89'	Stadium: Juventus Stadium; Attendance: 39,785; Referee: Nicola Rizzoli

26 April 2015 32	Torino	2–1	Juventus	Turin
15:00 CEST (UTC+02:00)	Darmian 45'; Quagliarella 57'; Gazzi (yellow card) 60'; Moretti (yellow card) 70'; Vives (yellow card) 88'	Report	Pirlo 35'; Bonucci (yellow card) 77'	Stadium: Stadio Olimpico di Torino; Attendance: 26,296; Referee: Paolo Tagliavento

29 April 2015 33	Juventus	3–2	Fiorentina	Turin
20:45 CEST (UTC+02:00)	Llorente 36'; Tevez 45+1', 70'; Evra (yellow card) 49'	Report	Gonzalo 33' (pen.), (yellow card) 38'; Neto (yellow card) 35'; Aquilani (yellow card) 76'; Iličić 90'	Stadium: Juventus Stadium; Attendance: 37,607; Referee: Luca Banti

2 May 2015 34	Sampdoria	0–1	Juventus	Genoa
18:00 CEST (UTC+02:00)	Obiang (yellow card) 44'; De Silvestri (yellow card) 83'; Soriano (yellow card) 87'; Romagnoli (yellow card) 89'	Report	Vidal 32'; Sturaro (yellow card) 61'	Stadium: Stadio Luigi Ferraris; Attendance: 22,083; Referee: Paolo Valeri

9 May 2015 35	Juventus	1–1	Cagliari	Turin
18:00 CEST (UTC+02:00)	Pogba 45'; Marchisio (yellow card) 57'	Report	Avelar (yellow card) 32'; João Pedro (yellow card) 50'; Rossettini 85'	Stadium: Juventus Stadium; Attendance: 38,909; Referee: Sebastiano Peruzzo

16 May 2015 36	Internazionale	1–2	Juventus	Milan
18:00 CEST (UTC+02:00)	Icardi 9'; Ranocchia (yellow card) 33'; Brozović (yellow card) 35'; Vidić (yellow card) 41'; Kovačić (yellow card) 58'; Juan Jesus (yellow card) 67'	Report	Marchisio 42' (pen.); Morata (yellow card) 52', (goal) 83'; Lichtsteiner (yellow card) 54'	Stadium: San Siro; Attendance: 60,362; Referee: Daniele Doveri

23 May 2015 37	Juventus	3–1	Napoli	Turin
18:00 CEST (UTC+02:00)	Pereyra 13'; Asamoah (yellow card) 49'; Sturaro 77'; Morata (yellow card) 90+2'; Pepe 90+3' (pen.)	Report	Insigne (penalty missed) 50'; López 50'; Ghoulam (yellow card) 83'; Britos (red card) 90+2'	Stadium: Juventus Stadium; Attendance: 40,485; Referee: Luca Banti

30 May 2015 38	Hellas Verona	2–2	Juventus	Verona
18:00 CEST (UTC+02:00)	Tachtsidis (yellow card) 37'; Toni 48'; Márquez (yellow card) 87'; Juanito (yellow card) 65', (goal) 90+3'	Report	Tevez (yellow card) 31' (penalty missed) 88'; Pereyra 42'; Llorente 57'; Pepe (red card) 90+2'	Stadium: Stadio Marc'Antonio Bentegodi; Attendance: 23,149; Referee: Marco Di Bello

=== Coppa Italia ===
Juventus started the Coppa Italia directly in the round of 16, as one of the eight best seeded teams.

15 January 2015 Round of 16	Juventus	6–1	Hellas Verona	Turin
21:00 CET (UTC+01:00)	Giovinco 5', 45+1'; Pereyra 21'; Pogba 53'; Morata 63' (pen.); Coman 79'		Nenê (yellow card) 22', (goal) 57'; Rodríguez (yellow card) 42'	Stadium: Juventus Stadium; Attendance: 39,302; Referee: Gianpaolo Calvarese

28 January 2015 Quarter-finals	Parma	0–1	Juventus	Parma
20:45 CET (UTC+01:00)	Gobbi (yellow card) 15'; Paletta (yellow card) 61'		Morata 89'	Stadium: Stadio Ennio Tardini; Attendance: 8,344; Referee: Sebastiano Peruzzo

5 March 2015 Semi-finals; First leg	Juventus	1–2	Fiorentina	Turin
20:45 CET (UTC+01:00)	Llorente 24'; Pogba (yellow card) 36'; Cáceres (yellow card) 73'; Marchisio (yellow card) 77'; Tevez (yellow card) 90+1'		Salah 11', 56'; Kurtić (yellow card) 17'; Badelj (yellow card) 41'; Basanta (yellow card) 67'; Fernández (yellow card) 86'	Stadium: Juventus Stadium; Attendance: 40,221; Referee: Paolo Valeri

7 April 2015 Semi-finals; Second leg	Fiorentina	0–3 (2–4 agg.)	Juventus	Florence
20:45 CEST (UTC+02:00)	Gonzalo (yellow card) 61'; Fernández (yellow card) 71'		Matri 21'; Sturaro (yellow card) 30'; Chiellini (yellow card) 40'; Pereyra 44'; Bonucci 59'; Marchisio (yellow card) 61'; Vidal (yellow card) 78'; Morata (red card) 87'	Stadium: Stadio Artemio Franchi; Attendance: 30,346; Referee: Davide Massa

20 May 2015 Final	Juventus	2–1 (a.e.t.)	Lazio	Rome
20:45 CEST (UTC+02:00)	Chiellini 11'; Evra (yellow card) 60'; Bonucci (yellow card) 64'; Matri 97', (yellow card) 97'		Radu 4'; Parolo (yellow card) 18'; Candreva (yellow card) 109'	Stadium: Stadio Olimpico; Attendance: 61,000; Referee: Daniele Orsato

=== UEFA Champions League ===
==== Group stage ====
Pos	Team	Pld	W	D	L	GF	GA	GD	Pts	Qualification	ATM	JUV	OLY	MAL
1	(Spain) Atlético Madrid	6	4	1	1	14	3	+11	13	Advance to knockout phase	—	1–0	4–0	5–0
2	(Italy) Juventus	6	3	1	2	7	4	+3	10	Advance to knockout phase	0–0	—	3–2	2–0
3	(Greece) Olympiacos	6	3	0	3	10	13	−3	9	Transfer to Europa League	3–2	1–0	—	4–2
4	(Sweden) Malmö FF	6	1	0	5	4	15	−11	3		0–2	0–2	2–0	—

Source: UEFA
Rules for classification: Group stage tiebreakers

16 September 2014 1	Juventus (Italy)	2–0	(Sweden) Malmö FF	Turin, Italy
20:45 CEST (UTC+02:00)	Tevez 59', 90'	Report	Konate (yellow card) 10'; M. Eriksson (yellow card) 22'; Helander (yellow card) 89'	Stadium: Juventus Stadium; Attendance: 31,218; Referee: Szymon Marciniak (Poland)

1 October 2014 2	Atlético Madrid (Spain)	1–0	(Italy) Juventus	Madrid, Spain
20:45 CEST (UTC+02:00)	García (yellow card) 54'; Ansaldi (yellow card) 63'; Turan 75'	Report	Bonucci (yellow card) 13'; Chiellini (yellow card) 57'; Lichtsteiner (yellow card) 85'; Morata (yellow card) 86'; Pogba (yellow card) 90+1'; Giovinco (yellow card) 90+4'	Stadium: Vicente Calderón; Attendance: 44,322; Referee: Felix Brych (Germany)

22 October 2014 3	Olympiacos (Greece)	1–0	(Italy) Juventus	Piraeus, Greece
20:45 CEST (UTC+02:00)	Kasami 36'; Botía (yellow card) 44'; Masuaku (yellow card) 56'	Report	Lichtsteiner (yellow card) 38'; Pogba (yellow card) 59'; Marchisio (yellow card) 66'	Stadium: Karaiskakis Stadium; Attendance: 31,411; Referee: Milorad Mažić (Serbia)

4 November 2014 4	Juventus (Italy)	3–2	(Greece) Olympiacos	Turin, Italy
20:45 CET (UTC+01:00)	Pirlo 21'; Tevez (yellow card) 49'; Roberto 65' (o.g.); Pogba 66'; Vidal (penalty missed) 90'+5'	Report	Botía 24', (yellow card) 85'; N'Dinga 61'	Stadium: Juventus Stadium; Attendance: 39,091; Referee: Martin Atkinson (England)

26 November 2014 5	Malmö FF (Sweden)	0–2	(Italy) Juventus	Malmö, Sweden
20:45 CET (UTC+01:00)	Olsen (yellow card) 88'; E. Johansson (yellow card) 89' (yellow-red card) 89'; Rosenberg (yellow card) 90'	Report	Llorente 49'; Pereyra (yellow card) 85'; Tevez 88'; Morata (yellow card) 90+1'	Stadium: Swedbank Stadion; Attendance: 20,500; Referee: Pedro Proença (Portugal)

9 December 2014 6	Juventus (Italy)	0–0	(Spain) Atlético Madrid	Turin, Italy
20:45 CET (UTC+01:00)	Vidal (yellow card) 22'	Report	Suárez (yellow card) 26'; Siqueira (yellow card) 37'	Stadium: Juventus Stadium; Attendance: 39,219; Referee: Willie Collum (Scotland)

==== Knockout phase ====
===== Round of 16 =====
24 February 2015 First leg	Juventus (Italy)	2–1	(Germany) Borussia Dortmund	Turin, Italy
20:45 CET (UTC+01:00)	Tevez 13'; Morata 43'; Vidal (yellow card) 48'; Pereyra (yellow card) 79'	Report	Reus 18'	Stadium: Juventus Stadium; Attendance: 41,182; Referee: Antonio Mateu Lahoz (Spain)

18 March 2015 Second leg	Borussia Dortmund (Germany)	0–3 (1–5 agg.)	(Italy) Juventus	Dortmund, Germany
20:45 CET (UTC+01:00)	Reus (yellow card) 73'	Report	Tevez 3', 79'; Morata 70'	Stadium: Signal Iduna Park; Attendance: 65,851; Referee: Milorad Mažić (Serbia)

===== Quarter-finals =====
14 April 2015 First leg	Juventus (Italy)	1–0	(France) Monaco	Turin, Italy
20:45 CEST (UTC+02:00)	Vidal 57' (pen.)	Report	Carvalho (yellow card) 55'	Stadium: Juventus Stadium; Attendance: 40,801; Referee: Pavel Královec (Czech Republic)

22 April 2015 Second leg	Monaco (France)	0–0 (0–1 agg.)	(Italy) Juventus	Monaco
20:45 CEST (UTC+02:00)	Silva (yellow card) 50'; Kondogbia (yellow card) 76'	Report	Chiellini (yellow card) 1'; Tevez (yellow card) 86'	Stadium: Stade Louis II; Attendance: 16,889; Referee: Willie Collum (Scotland)

===== Semi-finals =====
5 May 2015 First leg	Juventus (Italy)	2–1	(Spain) Real Madrid	Turin, Italy
20:45 CEST (UTC+02:00)	Bonucci (yellow card) 5'; Morata 9'; Tevez (yellow card) 46', (goal) 58' (pen.); Vidal (yellow card) 56'; Chiellini (yellow card) 90+3'	Report	Ronaldo 27'; Marcelo (yellow card) 57'; Carvajal (yellow card) 75'; Rodríguez (yellow card) 85'	Stadium: Juventus Stadium; Attendance: 41,011; Referee: Martin Atkinson (England)

13 May 2015 Second leg	Real Madrid (Spain)	1–1 (2–3 agg.)	(Italy) Juventus	Madrid, Spain
20:45 CEST (UTC+02:00)	Ronaldo 23' (pen.); Isco (yellow card) 32'; Rodríguez (yellow card) 44'	Report	Morata 57'; Tevez (yellow card) 69'; Lichtsteiner (yellow card) 76'	Stadium: Santiago Bernabéu; Attendance: 78,153; Referee: Jonas Eriksson (Sweden)

===== Final =====
6 June 2015 Final	Juventus (Italy)	1–3	(Spain) Barcelona	Berlin, Germany
20:45 CEST (UTC+02:00)	Vidal (yellow card) 11'; Pogba (yellow card) 41'; Morata 55'	Report	Rakitić 4'; Suárez 68', (yellow card) 70'; Neymar 90+7'	Stadium: Olympiastadion; Attendance: 70,442; Referee: Cüneyt Çakır (Turkey)

== Statistics ==
=== Appearances and goals ===
No.	Pos	Nat	Player	Total		Serie A		Supercoppa Italiana		Coppa Italia		Champions League	
No.	Pos	Nat	Player	Apps	Goals	Apps	Goals	Apps	Goals	Apps	Goals	Apps	Goals
Goalkeepers
1	GK	(Italy) ITA	Gianluigi Buffon	47	0	33	0	1	0	0	0	13	0
30	GK	(Italy) ITA	Marco Storari	10	0	5	0	0	0	5	0	0	0
34	GK	(Brazil) BRA	Rubinho	0	0	0	0	0	0	0	0	0	0
Defenders
3	DF	(Italy) ITA	Giorgio Chiellini	45	1	27+1	0	1	0	3+1	1	12	0
4	DF	(Uruguay) URU	Martín Cáceres	14	1	10	1	0	0	1+1	0	2	0
5	DF	(Italy) ITA	Angelo Ogbonna	30	0	18+7	0	0	0	3+1	0	1	0
15	DF	(Italy) ITA	Andrea Barzagli	17	0	9+1	0	0	0	1	0	2+4	0
16	DF	(Italy) ITA	Marco Motta	0	0	0	0	0	0	0	0	0	0
19	DF	(Italy) ITA	Leonardo Bonucci	52	4	33+1	3	1	0	4	1	13	0
26	DF	(Switzerland) SUI	Stephan Lichtsteiner	49	3	26+6	3	1	0	3	0	13	0
33	DF	(France) FRA	Patrice Evra	34	1	21	1	1	0	2	0	10	0
Midfielders
2	MF	(Italy) ITA	Rômulo	5	0	3+1	0	0	0	0	0	0+1	0
6	MF	(France) FRA	Paul Pogba	41	10	24+2	8	1	0	3+1	1	10	1
7	MF	(Italy) ITA	Simone Pepe	16	1	1+11	1	0	0	3	0	0+1	0
8	MF	(Italy) ITA	Claudio Marchisio	52	3	33+2	3	1	0	4	0	11+1	0
17	MF	(Italy) ITA	Paolo De Ceglie	2	0	1+1	0	0	0	0	0	0	0
20	MF	(Italy) ITA	Simone Padoin	35	0	14+11	0	0+1	0	4+1	0	1+3	0
21	MF	(Italy) ITA	Andrea Pirlo	33	5	19+1	4	1	0	2	0	10	1
22	MF	(Ghana) GHA	Kwadwo Asamoah	10	0	7	0	0	0	0	0	3	0
23	MF	(Chile) CHI	Arturo Vidal	45	8	23+5	7	1	0	4	0	12	1
24	MF	(Italy) ITA	Mattia Vitale	2	0	0+2	0	0	0	0	0	0	0
27	MF	(Italy) ITA	Stefano Sturaro	15	1	8+4	1	0	0	1	0	1+1	0
37	MF	(Argentina) ARG	Roberto Pereyra	52	6	27+8	4	0+1	0	2+2	2	3+9	0
38	MF	(Italy) ITA	Federico Mattiello	3	0	0+2	0	0	0	0+1	0	0	0
39	MF	(Italy) ITA	Luca Marrone	0	0	0	0	0	0	0	0	0	0
Forwards
9	FW	(Spain) ESP	Álvaro Morata	46	15	11+18	8	0+1	0	2+2	2	9+3	5
10	FW	(Argentina) ARG	Carlos Tevez	48	29	29+3	20	1	2	1+1	0	13	7
11	FW	(France) FRA	Kingsley Coman	20	1	5+9	0	0	0	2+2	1	0+2	0
14	FW	(Spain) ESP	Fernando Llorente	45	9	25+6	7	1	0	3+1	1	4+5	1
32	FW	(Italy) ITA	Alessandro Matri	10	2	4+2	0	0	0	1+1	2	0+2	0
Players transferred out during the season
12	FW	(Italy) ITA	Sebastian Giovinco	11	2	3+4	0	0	0	1	2	0+3	0

Source: Competitions

=== Goalscorers ===
Rank	No.	Pos.	Nat.	Player	Serie A	Supercoppa Italiana	Coppa Italia	Champions League	Total
1	10	FW	(Argentina)	Carlos Tevez	20	2	0	7	29
2	9	FW	(Spain)	Álvaro Morata	8	0	2	5	15
3	6	MF	(France)	Paul Pogba	8	0	1	1	10
4	14	FW	(Spain)	Fernando Llorente	7	0	1	1	9
5	23	MF	(Chile)	Arturo Vidal	7	0	0	1	8
6	37	MF	(Argentina)	Roberto Pereyra	4	0	2	0	6
7	21	MF	(Italy)	Andrea Pirlo	4	0	0	1	5
8	19	DF	(Italy)	Leonardo Bonucci	3	0	1	0	4
9	8	MF	(Italy)	Claudio Marchisio	3	0	0	0	3
9	26	DF	(Switzerland)	Stephan Lichtsteiner	3	0	0	0	3
11	12	FW	(Italy)	Sebastian Giovinco	0	0	2	0	2
11	32	FW	(Italy)	Alessandro Matri	0	0	2	0	2
13	4	DF	(Uruguay)	Martín Cáceres	1	0	0	0	1
13	7	MF	(Italy)	Simone Pepe	1	0	0	0	1
13	27	MF	(Italy)	Stefano Sturaro	1	0	0	0	1
13	33	DF	(France)	Patrice Evra	1	0	0	0	1
17	3	DF	(Italy)	Giorgio Chiellini	0	0	1	0	1
17	11	MF	(France)	Kingsley Coman	0	0	1	0	1
Own goals					1	0	0	1	2
Totals					72	2	13	17	104

=== Disciplinary record ===
No.	Pos.	Nat.	Player	Serie A			Supercoppa Italiana			Coppa Italia			Champions League			Total		
No.	Pos.	Nat.	Player	Booked	(yellow card) (yellow-red card)	Sent off (straight red)	Booked	(yellow card) (yellow-red card)	Sent off (straight red)	Booked	(yellow card) (yellow-red card)	Sent off (straight red)	Booked	(yellow card) (yellow-red card)	Sent off (straight red)	Booked	(yellow card) (yellow-red card)	Sent off (straight red)
3	DF	(Italy)	Giorgio Chiellini	7	0	0	0	0	0	1	0	0	3	0	0	11	0	0
4	DF	(Uruguay)	Martín Cáceres	1	0	0	0	0	0	1	0	0	0	0	0	2	0	0
5	DF	(Italy)	Angelo Ogbonna	4	0	0	0	0	0	0	0	0	0	0	0	4	0	0
15	DF	(Italy)	Andrea Barzagli	2	0	0	0	0	0	0	0	0	0	0	0	2	0	0
19	DF	(Italy)	Leonardo Bonucci	8	0	0	0	0	0	1	0	0	2	0	0	11	0	0
26	DF	(Switzerland)	Stephan Lichtsteiner	8	1	0	0	0	0	0	0	0	3	0	0	11	0	1
33	DF	(France)	Patrice Evra	4	0	0	0	0	0	1	0	0	0	0	0	5	0	0
6	MF	(France)	Paul Pogba	4	0	0	0	0	0	1	0	0	3	0	0	8	0	0
7	MF	(Italy)	Simone Pepe	0	0	1	0	0	0	0	0	0	0	0	0	0	0	1
8	MF	(Italy)	Claudio Marchisio	9	0	0	0	0	0	2	0	0	1	0	0	12	0	0
20	MF	(Italy)	Simone Padoin	2	1	0	0	0	0	0	0	0	0	0	0	2	1	0
22	MF	(Ghana)	Kwadwo Asamoah	2	0	0	0	0	0	0	0	0	0	0	0	2	0	0
23	MF	(Chile)	Arturo Vidal	7	0	0	0	0	0	1	0	0	4	0	0	12	0	0
27	MF	(Italy)	Stefano Sturaro	1	0	0	0	0	0	1	0	0	0	0	0	2	0	0
37	MF	(Argentina)	Roberto Pereyra	2	0	0	1	0	0	0	0	0	2	0	0	5	0	0
9	FW	(Spain)	Álvaro Morata	6	0	1	0	0	0	0	0	1	2	0	0	8	0	2
10	FW	(Argentina)	Carlos Tevez	6	0	0	1	0	0	1	0	0	4	0	0	12	0	0
12	FW	(Italy)	Sebastian Giovinco	0	0	0	0	0	0	0	0	0	1	0	0	1	0	0
32	FW	(Italy)	Alessandro Matri	0	0	0	0	0	0	1	0	0	0	0	0	1	0	0
Totals				73	2	2	2	0	0	11	0	1	25	0	0	111	2	3
