= 2014 Supercoppa Italiana =

- Event: Supercoppa Italiana
Juventus	Napoli
Serie A	Coppa Italia
2	2
- After extra time Napoli won 6–5 on penalties
- Date: 22 December 2014
- Venue: Jassim bin Hamad Stadium, Doha, Qatar
- Referee: Paolo Valeri
- Attendance: 14,000

The 2014 Supercoppa Italiana was the 27th edition of the Supercoppa Italiana, played on 22 December 2014 at the Jassim bin Hamad Stadium in Doha, Qatar. It was held between 2013–14 Serie A champions, Juventus, and the winners of the 2013–14 Coppa Italia, Napoli. Juventus were the defending champions. The game was tentatively scheduled to be played on 24 August 2014, but due to Napoli's participation in the 2014–15 UEFA Champions League play-off round, the team asked that the game be rescheduled during Serie A's winter break. Napoli emerged as the victorious side 6–5 in a penalty shootout, following a 2–2 draw, to pick up their second trophy in the tournament. Qatar became the fifth different country to host a Supercoppa Italiana.

== Background ==
Juventus was making a record 10th appearance, and seeking a record seventh cup. They had won the last two editions of the Supercoppa, with an overall record of six wins and three defeats, then a joint record with Milan. Both of Napoli's prior appearances had been against Juventus, beating them 5–1 in 1990 but losing 2–4 after extra time in 2012.

== Venue ==
City	Stadium	Location of the host city of the 2014 Supercoppa Italiana.
Doha	Jassim bin Hamad Stadium (Al-Sadd Stadium)	Location of the host city of the 2014 Supercoppa Italiana.
Capacity: 15,000		Location of the host city of the 2014 Supercoppa Italiana.

== Match ==
Carlos Tevez put Juventus ahead in the fifth minute following defensive errors by Napoli. Marek Hamšík and Gonzalo Higuaín both struck the post, but the latter equalised with a header in the second half, and the game went into extra time.

Tevez again gave his team the lead in the second half of extra time, but with three minutes remaining Higuaín equalised for a second time to force a penalty shootout. Both of the first kicks in the shootout missed: Tevez hit the post and Jorginho had his attempt for Napoli saved by Gianluigi Buffon. With both teams scoring four in the shootout, it went to sudden death, in which both teams had two consecutive misses each: Giorgio Chiellini had his attempt saved and Roberto Pereyra shot high, while Buffon saved attempts from Napoli duo Dries Mertens and José Callejón. Finally, Kalidou Koulibaly netted for Napoli, then their goalkeeper Rafael saved attempt from Simone Padoin to win the trophy.

=== Details ===
22 December 2014
20:30 (UTC+3)

Juventus	2–2 (a.e.t.)	Napoli
Tevez 5', 107'	Report	Higuaín 68', 118'
Penalties
Tevez (penalty missed); Vidal (penalty scored); Pogba (penalty scored); Marchisio (penalty scored); Morata (penalty scored); Bonucci (penalty scored); Chiellini (penalty missed); Pereyra (penalty missed); Padoin (penalty missed)	5–6	(penalty missed) Jorginho; (penalty scored) Ghoulam; (penalty scored) Albiol; (penalty scored) Inler; (penalty scored) Higuaín; (penalty scored) Gargano; (penalty missed) Mertens; (penalty missed) Callejón; (penalty scored) Koulibaly

Jassim bin Hamad Stadium, Doha (Qatar)
Attendance: 14,000
Referee: Paolo Valeri

Juventus	Napoli

GK	1	(Italy) Gianluigi Buffon (c)
RB	26	(Switzerland) Stephan Lichtsteiner		(substituted off) 79'
CB	19	(Italy) Leonardo Bonucci
CB	3	(Italy) Giorgio Chiellini
LB	33	(France) Patrice Evra
DM	21	(Italy) Andrea Pirlo		(substituted off) 66'
RM	23	(Chile) Arturo Vidal
CM	6	(France) Paul Pogba
LM	8	(Italy) Claudio Marchisio
CF	10	(Argentina) Carlos Tevez	(yellow card) 109'
CF	14	(Spain) Fernando Llorente		(substituted off) 106'
Substitutes:
GK	30	(Italy) Marco Storari
GK	34	(Brazil) Rubinho
DF	5	(Italy) Angelo Ogbonna
DF	41	(Italy) Filippo Romagna
MF	7	(Italy) Simone Pepe
MF	11	(France) Kingsley Coman
MF	20	(Italy) Simone Padoin		(substituted on) 79'
MF	37	(Argentina) Roberto Pereyra	(yellow card) 69'	(substituted on) 66'
MF	38	(Italy) Federico Mattiello
FW	9	(Spain) Álvaro Morata		(substituted on) 106'
FW	12	(Italy) Sebastian Giovinco
Manager:
(Italy) Massimiliano Allegri

GK	1	(Brazil) Rafael
RB	11	(Italy) Christian Maggio
CB	22	(Spain) Raúl Albiol	(yellow card) 80'
CB	26	(France) Kalidou Koulibaly
LB	31	(Algeria) Faouzi Ghoulam	(yellow card) 105'
DM	19	(Spain) David López		(substituted off) 91'
DM	77	(Uruguay) Walter Gargano
RW	7	(Spain) José Callejón	(yellow card) 76'
AM	17	(Slovakia) Marek Hamšík (c)		(substituted off) 78'
LW	6	(Netherlands) Jonathan de Guzmán		(substituted off) 106'
CF	9	(Argentina) Gonzalo Higuaín	(yellow card) 45+1'
Substitutes:
GK	15	(Italy) Roberto Colombo
GK	45	(Argentina) Mariano Andújar
DF	4	(Brazil) Henrique
DF	5	(Uruguay) Miguel Britos
DF	16	(Italy) Giandomenico Mesto
DF	96	(Italy) Sebastiano Luperto
MF	8	(Brazil) Jorginho		(substituted on) 106'
MF	14	(Belgium) Dries Mertens	(yellow card) 83'	(substituted on) 78'
MF	22	(Croatia) Josip Radošević
MF	60	(Italy) Antonio Romano
MF	88	(Switzerland) Gökhan Inler		(substituted on) 91'
FW	91	(Colombia) Duván Zapata
Manager:
(Spain) Rafael Benítez

== See also ==
- 2014–15 Serie A
- 2014–15 Coppa Italia
- 2014–15 Juventus FC season
- 2014–15 SSC Napoli season
- Juventus FC–SSC Napoli rivalry

Played between same clubs:

- 1990 Supercoppa Italiana
- 2012 Supercoppa Italiana
- 2020 Supercoppa Italiana
