= Simone Padoin =

Italian footballer

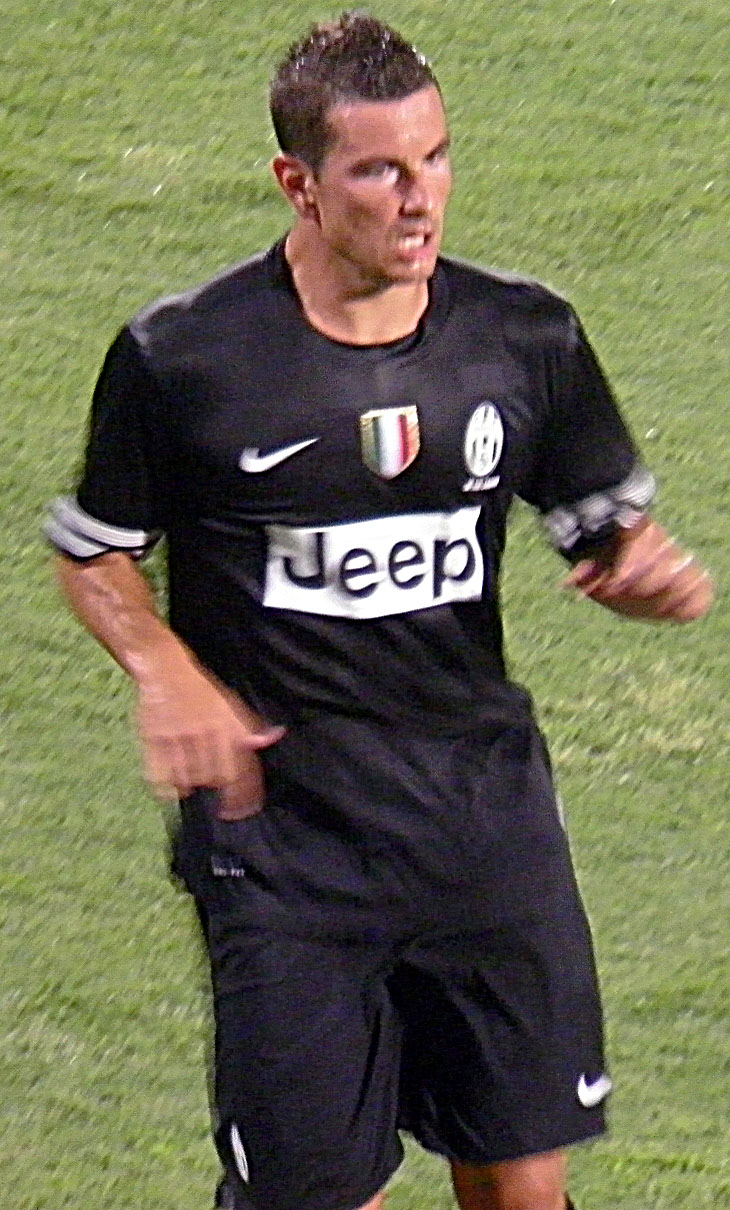
- Padoin playing for Juventus in 2012

Personal information
- Full name: Simone Padoin
- Date of birth: 18 March 1984 (age 42)
- Place of birth: Gemona del Friuli, Italy
- Height: 1.77 m (5 ft 10 in)
- Positions: Midfielder; wingback

Team information
- Current team: Juventus U20 (head coach)

Youth career
- Atalanta

Senior career*
Years	Team	Apps	(Gls)
2003–2007	Vicenza	126	(6)
2007–2012	Atalanta	156	(10)
2012–2016	Juventus	84	(3)
2016–2019	Cagliari	98	(2)
2019–2020	Ascoli	32	(0)
Total		496	(21)

International career
2002–2003	Italy U-19	9	(0)
2003–2004	Italy U-20	6	(1)
2006–2007	Italy U-21	7	(1)

Managerial career
- 2021–2024: Juventus (technical coach)
- 2024–2025: Juventus U20 (assistant coach)
- 2025–: Juventus U20 (head coach)
- * Club domestic league appearances and goals

Simone Padoin (Italian pronunciation: [siˈmoːne padoˈin]; born 18 March 1984) is an Italian former professional footballer who played as a wing-back or midfielder.

After starting out in the Atalanta youth side, he later also represented Vicenza, before returning to Atalanta to play for the senior side in 2007. He then transferred to Juventus in January 2012, where he remained until 2016, winning five consecutive Serie A titles with the club, among other trophies. In July 2016, he moved to Cagliari. He joined Ascoli in 2019.

== Club career ==
=== Vicenza and Atalanta ===
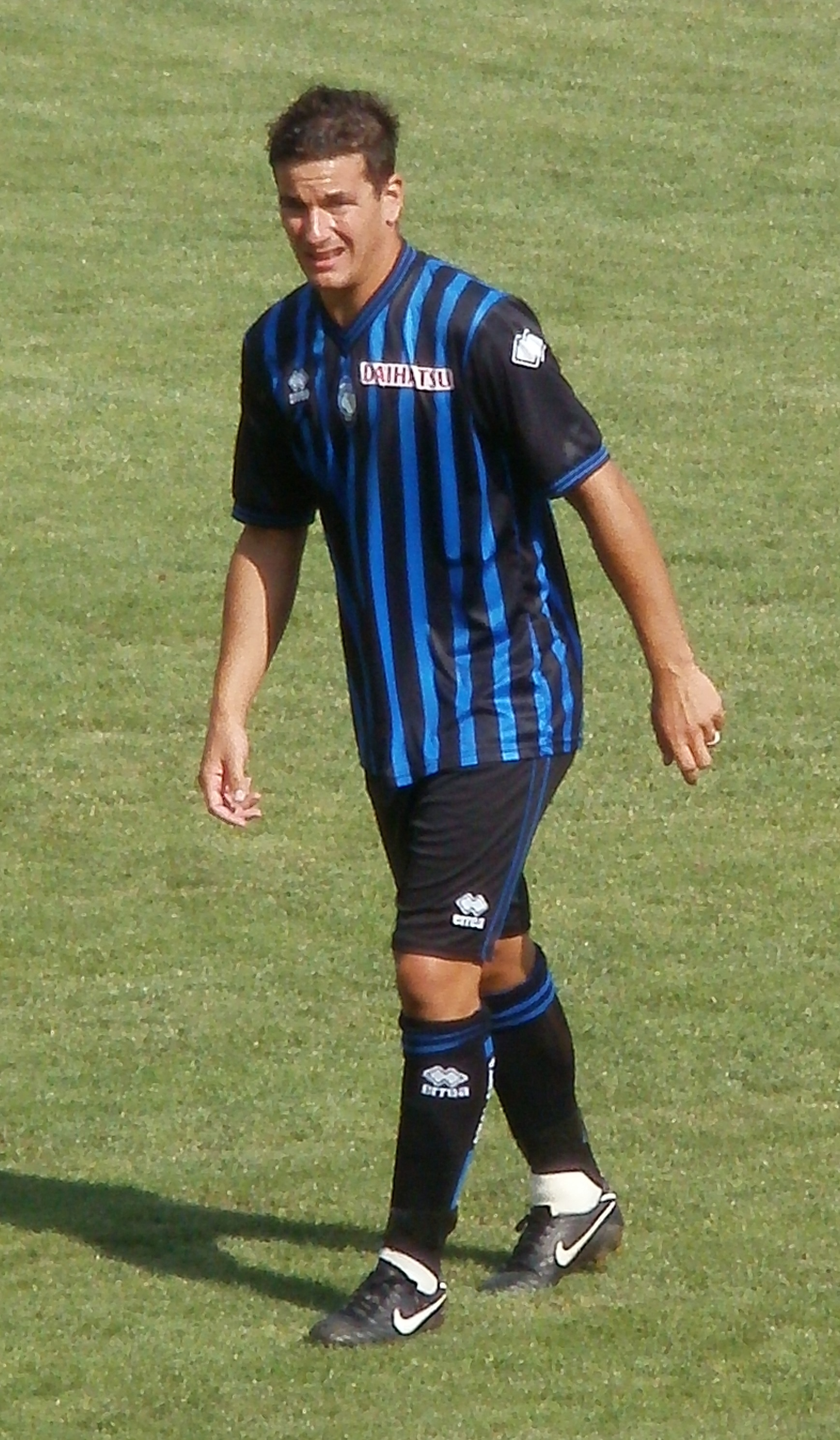
Padoin playing for Atalanta in 2010

A product of Atalanta's fruitful youth academy, Simone joined Vicenza from Atalanta in a co-ownership deal in 2003, which became full-ownership one year later.

At the beginning of the 2007–08 season, he returned to Atalanta for € 1.9 million when the club bought back half of his registration rights from Vicenza (€1M cash plus Brivio). On 4 January 2008, Vicenza signed Zampagna (€1.9M) and Brivio (€0.75M) outright; with the remain 50% registration rights of Padoin was sold from Vicenza for €1.55 million. The overall transaction means Vicenza paid Atalanta €100,000 cash in net, plus Padoin, to acquire Brivio and Zampagna outright.

Padoin added three more years to his contract on 13 May 2009, which took his deal to June 2013.

After the end of the 2009–10 Serie A season, he was borrowed by Juventus for their US tour, along with four other players. He played a few games for Juventus in their post-season tour and then returned to Atalanta for their own preseason work.

=== Juventus ===
On 31 January 2012, he permanently moved to Juventus for a fee of €5 million in 4 1/2-year contract. On 17 March of the same year, he scored his first goal with Juventus in an away fixture against Fiorentina which ended in a 5–0 victory; he scored the 5th goal of the match.

On 22 December 2014, in the 2014 Supercoppa Italiana final against Napoli in Doha, Padoin came on as a substitute for Stephan Lichtsteiner after 79 minutes. In the resulting penalty shootout, which went to sudden death, he had the decisive spot-kick saved by Rafael, handing Napoli the victory.

On 8 November 2015, Padoin made his 200th Serie A appearance in a 3–1 away win over Empoli.

=== Cagliari ===
On 4 July 2016, Juventus confirmed that Padoin had been sold to newly promoted Cagliari for a fee of €600,000. He made his debut for the team in a 5–1 win against S.P.A.L. in the First Round Coppa Italia, and scored his first, and so far only goal for the club in a 2–1 home league win against Crotone.

=== Ascoli ===
On 2 September 2019, he signed a two-year contract with one-year extension option with Ascoli.

== Managerial career ==
On 22 July 2021, Padoin became a technical collaborator of Massimiliano Allegri's staff in Juventus.

== Style of play ==
Padoin has been praised by his managers for his work-rate, consistency, tactical intelligence, and versatility, as he is capable of playing in several positions, and adapting himself to different formations. Although he usually plays anywhere in midfield, throughout his career he has also been deployed in defence, as a full-back, as a central defender, and as a wing-back. A box-to-box player, he has also functioned as a central midfielder, as a mezzala, defensive midfielder, as an offensive midfielder, and as a winger.

== Career statistics ==
=== Club ===
Appearances and goals by club, season and competition
Club	Season	League			Cup (Note: Includes Coppa Italia.)		Europe (Note: Includes UEFA Champions League.)		Other (Note: Includes Supercoppa Italiana.)		Total	
Club	Season	Division	Apps	Goals	Apps	Goals	Apps	Goals	Apps	Goals	Apps	Goals
Vicenza	2003–04	Serie B	23	1	1	0	–	–	–	–	24	1
Vicenza	2004–05	Serie B	31	0	3	0	–	–	–	–	34	0
Vicenza	2005–06	Serie B	35	1	0	0	–	–	–	–	35	1
Vicenza	2006–07	Serie B	37	4	1	0	–	–	–	–	38	4
Vicenza	Total		126	6	5	0	–	–	–	–	131	6
Atalanta	2007–08	Serie A	31	3	1	1	–	–	–	–	32	4
Atalanta	2008–09	Serie A	36	3	1	0	–	–	–	–	37	3
Atalanta	2009–10	Serie A	36	2	1	0	–	–	–	–	37	2
Atalanta	2010–11	Serie B	34	2	1	1	–	–	–	–	35	3
Atalanta	2011–12	Serie A	19	0	1	0	–	–	–	–	20	0
Atalanta	Total		156	10	5	2	–	–	–	–	161	12
Juventus	2011–12	Serie A	6	1	1	0	–	–	–	–	10	1
Juventus	2012–13	Serie A	20	0	2	0	3	0	1	0	26	0
Juventus	2013–14	Serie A	21	1	1	0	3	0	0	0	25	1
Juventus	2014–15	Serie A	25	0	5	0	4	0	1	0	35	0
Juventus	2015–16	Serie A	12	1	2	0	0	0	0	0	14	1
Juventus	Total		84	3	11	0	10	0	2	0	107	3
Cagliari	2016–17	Serie A	31	1	1	0	–	–	–	–	32	1
Cagliari	2017–18	Serie A	37	1	0	0	–	–	–	–	37	1
Cagliari	2018–19	Serie A	30	0	2	0	–	–	–	–	32	0
Cagliari	Total		98	2	3	0	0	0	0	0	101	2
Ascoli	2019–20	Serie B	31	0	0	0	–	–	–	–	31	0
Ascoli	2020–21	Serie B	1	0	0	0	–	–	–	–	1	0
Ascoli	Total		32	0	0	0	0	0	0	0	32	0
Career total			496	21	24	2	10	0	2	0	532	23

== Honours ==
Atalanta

- Serie B: 2010–11

Juventus

- Serie A: 2011–12, 2012–13, 2013–14, 2014–15, 2015–16
- Supercoppa Italiana: 2012, 2013, 2015
- Coppa Italia: 2014–15, 2015–16
