= Stefano Pellizzari =

Italian footballer

Personal information
- Date of birth: 3 January 1997 (age 29)
- Place of birth: Correggio, Italy
- Height: 1.84 m (6 ft 0 in)
- Position: Defender

Team information
- Current team: Pistoiese
- Number: 50

Youth career
- –2014: Cesena
- 2014–2016: Juventus
- 2015–2016: → Virtus Entella (loan)

Senior career*
Years	Team	Apps	(Gls)
2015–2019	Juventus	0	(0)
2015–2016	→ Virtus Entella (loan)	0	(0)
2016–2017	→ Carrarese (loan)	0	(0)
2017–2018	→ WSG Wattens (loan)	12	(0)
2018–2019	→ Ravenna (loan)	21	(0)
2019–2020	Ravenna	8	(1)
2020	Reggio Audace	0	(0)
2020–2021	Legnago	20	(2)
2021–2022	Vis Pesaro	6	(0)
2022	→ Legnago (loan)	7	(0)
2022–2023	Fermana	36	(1)
2023–2024	Ancona	22	(6)
2024–2025	Renate	13	(0)
2025	Forlì	9	(0)
2025–	Pistoiese	1	(0)
- * Club domestic league appearances and goals as of 11 January 2026

Stefano Pellizzari (born 3 January 1997) is an Italian footballer who plays as a defender for Serie D club Pistoiese.

== Club career ==
Pellizzari made his Austrian Football First League debut for WSG Wattens on 21 July 2017 in a game against TSV Hartberg.

On 24 July 2019, he returned to Ravenna on a permanent basis. On 20 January 2020, his contract with Ravenna was terminated.

On 23 January 2020 he signed with Serie C club Reggio Audace until the end of that season.

On 14 September 2020 he moved to Legnago.

On 14 July 2021 he joined Vis Pesaro on a two-year contract. On 21 January 2022, he returned on loan to Legnago.

On 19 August 2022, Pellizzari signed with Fermana.
