= Roberto Pereyra =

Argentine footballer (born 1991)

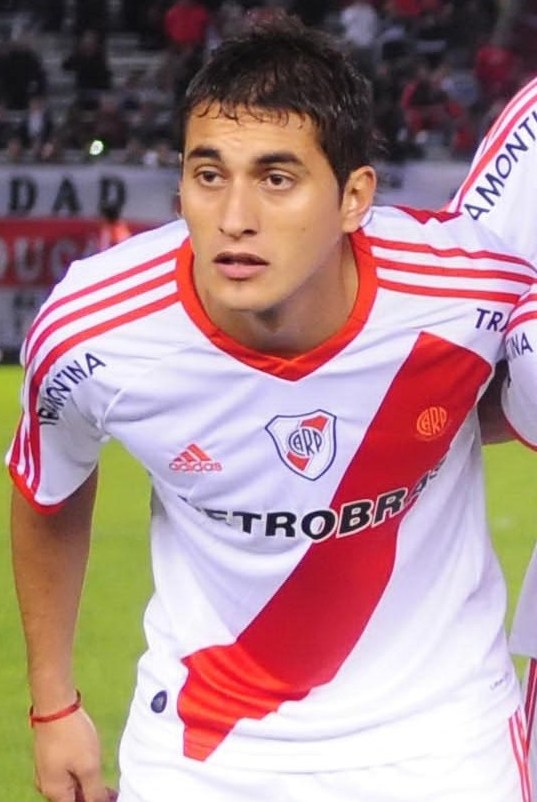
- Pereyra with River Plate in 2011

Personal information
- Full name: Roberto Maximiliano Pereyra
- Date of birth: 7 January 1991 (age 35)
- Place of birth: San Miguel de Tucumán, Argentina
- Height: 1.82 m (6 ft 0 in)
- Positions: Midfielder; forward

Youth career
- River Plate

Senior career*
| Years | Team | Apps | (Gls) |
| 2008–2011 | River Plate | 43 | (0) |
| 2011–2015 | Udinese | 84 | (8) |
| 2014–2015 | → Juventus (loan) | 35 | (4) |
| 2015–2016 | Juventus | 14 | (0) |
| 2016–2020 | Watford | 106 | (16) |
| 2020–2024 | Udinese | 119 | (17) |
| 2024–2026 | AEK Athens | 34 | (0) |

International career^{‡}
| 2011 | Argentina U20 | 4 | (0) |
| 2014–2019 | Argentina | 19 | (2) |
Medal record
Copa América
| Runner-up | 2015 Chile | Team |
| Third place | 2019 Brazil | Team |
- * Club domestic league appearances and goals as of 12 May 2026 ‡ National team caps and goals as of 10 October 2019

Roberto Maximiliano ''El Tucu'' Pereyra (Spanish pronunciation: [roˈβeɾto peˈɾejɾa]; born 7 January 1991) is an Argentine professional footballer who most recently played for Super League Greece club AEK Athens. A versatile player, he is capable of playing a variety of positions such as on the wing, in central midfield, attacking midfield or as a second striker.

After beginning his career in Argentina with River Plate, Pereyra joined Italian club Udinese in 2011, where his performances earned him a loan to defending league champions Juventus in 2014; he was signed permanently by The Old Lady in 2015 and won two consecutive Serie A titles during his time with the club. During his time in Italy, he developed into a well-rounded, adaptable, and tactically versatile player due to his dynamism, energy, and technique, as well as his offensive and defensive work-rate and attributes. In 2016, he joined English Premier League club Watford.

At international level, Pereyra made his senior debut in 2014, and has since obtained over ten caps; he represented the Argentina national football team at two editions of the Copa América, winning a runners-up medal and a bronze medal in the 2015 and the 2019 editions of the tournament respectively.

== Club career ==
=== River Plate ===
Born in San Miguel de Tucumán, Argentina, Pereyra began his career within the youth academy of River Plate; due to his origins, he was given the nickname "El Tucumano". His professional career began in 2009 when he made his River Plate debut in the Argentine Primera Division against Huracan at the age of 18. After featuring on 43 occasions for River, Pereyra transferred across the Atlantic Ocean, swapping continents, as he joined Udinese Calcio ahead of the 2011–12 Serie A season.

=== Udinese Calcio ===
Officially signing for Udinese on 30 August 2011, Pereyra signed a five-year contract with the Friuli outfit, and went on to make 15 appearances in all competitions during his debut season in Italy. His performances for Udinese during a three–year spell saw him contribute eight goals and seven assists in 84 league appearances, while he also represented the club in 6 Coppa Italia matches, 2 UEFA Champions League matches, and 12 UEFA Europa League games.

=== Juventus ===
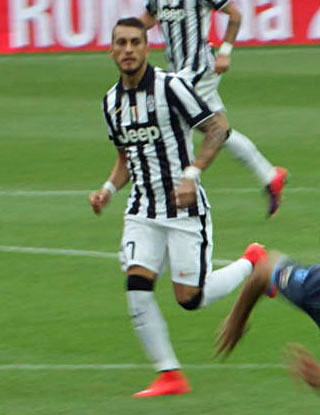
Pereyra with Juventus in 2015

On 25 July 2014, Pereyra officially signed for, at the time, three-time defending Serie A champions Juventus on a season-long loan deal from Udinese worth €1.5 million, with the option to sign the player outright at the conclusion of the 2014–15 Serie A campaign for an additional €14 million. On the same day, Pereyra appeared for his club in their first friendly match of the season against Lucento. On 23 August 2014, he featured for Juventus in the annual Trofeo TIM. Pereyra capitalised on Francesco Magnanelli's failed clearance to sidefoot home from just outside the six-yard box.

On 6 June 2015, Pereyra appeared as a substitute for Juventus in the 2015 UEFA Champions League Final as La Vecchia Signora was defeated 3–1 by FC Barcelona at Berlin's Olympiastadion. With 52 appearances, he made the most appearances for Juventus that season across all competitions, along with teammates Claudio Marchisio and Leonardo Bonucci.

On 23 June 2015, Juventus bought out Pereyra's Udinese loan for €14 million, keeping him at Juventus until 2019.

=== Watford ===
On 19 August 2016, Pereyra moved to Watford on a five-year deal for an undisclosed fee. According to an official club statement released by Juventus, the transfer is worth €13 million, with a possible €2 million in bonuses, which is to be paid over a four-year period. He was assigned the number 37 shirt for the 2016–17 season. On his Watford debut, Pereyra scored his first goal for the club in a 3–1 home defeat to Arsenal in the Premier League, on 27 August. On 5 February 2018, he came off the bench to score the fourth goal in a 4–1 thrashing of Chelsea.

=== Return to Udinese ===
Pereyra re-joined Italian side Udinese on 28 September 2020 for an undisclosed fee. After becoming a free agent in the summer of 2023 and missing the first games of the 2023–24 Serie A season, Pereyra returned to Udinese on a one-season contract on 11 September 2023.

== International career ==
Pereyra was selected to represent the Argentine under-20 football team at the 2011 FIFA U-20 World Cup. He played all three group games at the tournament, helping Argentina defeat Mexico and North Korea and draw with England. He missed Argentina's 2–1 Round of 16 victory over Egypt through suspension, but returned to the starting line-up in the quarter-final clash against Portugal, which Argentina lost on penalty kicks after neither team could score during 120 minutes.

He made his senior debut for Argentina on Saturday 11 October 2014 in a 2–0 friendly match loss against Brazil played in Beijing, China after being called up by Gerardo Martino.

Pereyra was a part of the Argentina national team at the 2015 Copa América, winning a runners-up medal.

On 11 October 2018, Pereyra scored his first senior international goal for Argentina in a 4–0 friendly win over Iraq in Saudi Arabia.

On 21 May 2019, he was included in Lionel Scaloni's final 23-man Argentina squad for the 2019 Copa América.

== Style of play ==
Pereyra has been described by his, at the time manager, Javi Gracia, as an "important, high quality player". Pereyra is able to play in several midfield and offensive positions, due to his adaptability, and energy, in addition to his offensive and defensive work-rate and attributes. He is usually deployed as an offensive midfielder in the centre, or as wide midfielder, on either flank, although his preferred position is on the left wing; he has even played as a second striker on occasion, or in a deeper role as a central midfielder. Due to his attributes, playing position and nationality, he was compared to the former Italo Argentine Juventus winger Mauro Camoranesi during his time in Italy.

== Career statistics ==
=== Club ===
As of match played 15 May 2026

Appearances and goals by club, season and competition
| Club | Season | League | | | National cup (Note: Includes Coppa Italia, FA Cup) | | League cup (Note: Includes EFL Cup) | | Continental | | Other | | Total | |
| Club | Season | Division | Apps | Goals | Apps | Goals | Apps | Goals | Apps | Goals | Apps | Goals | Apps | Goals |
|---|---|---|---|---|---|---|---|---|---|---|---|---|---|---|
| River Plate | 2008–09 | Argentine Primera División | 1 | 0 | 0 | 0 | — | | — | | — | | 1 | 0 |
| River Plate | 2009–10 | Argentine Primera División | 15 | 0 | 0 | 0 | — | | — | | — | | 15 | 0 |
| River Plate | 2010–11 | Argentine Primera División | 27 | 0 | 0 | 0 | — | | — | | — | | 27 | 0 |
| River Plate | Total | | 43 | 0 | 0 | 0 | — | | — | | — | | 43 | 0 |
| Udinese | 2011–12 | Serie A | 11 | 1 | 1 | 0 | — | | 3 (Note: Appearances in UEFA Europa League) | 0 | — | | 15 | 1 |
| Udinese | 2012–13 | Serie A | 37 | 5 | 1 | 0 | — | | 8 (Note: Two appearances in UEFA Champions League, six appearances in UEFA Europa League) | 0 | — | | 46 | 5 |
| Udinese | 2013–14 | Serie A | 36 | 2 | 4 | 0 | — | | 3 | 0 | — | | 43 | 2 |
| Udinese | Total | | 84 | 8 | 6 | 0 | — | | 14 | 0 | — | | 104 | 8 |
| Juventus (loan) | 2014–15 | Serie A | 35 | 4 | 4 | 2 | — | | 12 (Note: Appearances in UEFA Champions League) | 0 | 1 (Note: Appearance in Supercoppa Italiana) | 0 | 52 | 6 |
| Juventus | 2015–16 | Serie A | 13 | 0 | 0 | 0 | — | | 2 | 0 | 1 | 0 | 16 | 0 |
| Watford | 2016–17 | Premier League | 13 | 2 | 0 | 0 | 0 | 0 | — | | — | | 13 | 2 |
| Watford | 2017–18 | Premier League | 32 | 5 | 2 | 0 | 0 | 0 | — | | — | | 34 | 5 |
| Watford | 2018–19 | Premier League | 33 | 6 | 3 | 0 | 0 | 0 | — | | — | | 36 | 6 |
| Watford | 2019–20 | Premier League | 28 | 3 | 1 | 1 | 3 | 1 | — | | — | | 32 | 5 |
| Watford | Total | | 106 | 16 | 6 | 1 | 3 | 1 | — | | — | | 115 | 18 |
| Udinese | 2020–21 | Serie A | 34 | 5 | 1 | 0 | — | | — | | — | | 35 | 5 |
| Udinese | 2021–22 | Serie A | 24 | 3 | 1 | 2 | — | | — | | — | | 25 | 5 |
| Udinese | 2022–23 | Serie A | 34 | 5 | 2 | 0 | — | | — | | — | | 36 | 5 |
| Udinese | 2023–24 | Serie A | 27 | 4 | 0 | 0 | — | | — | | — | | 27 | 4 |
| Udinese | Total | | 119 | 17 | 4 | 2 | — | | — | | — | | 123 | 19 |
| AEK Athens | 2024–25 | Super League Greece | 25 | 0 | 4 | 0 | — | | 1 (Note: Appearance in UEFA Conference League) | 0 | — | | 30 | 0 |
| AEK Athens | 2025–26 | Super League Greece | 9 | 0 | 1 | 1 | — | | 11 (Note: Appearance in UEFA Conference League) | 1 | — | | 21 | 2 |
| AEK Athens | Total | | 34 | 0 | 5 | 1 | — | | 12 | 1 | — | | 51 | 2 |
| Career total | | | 434 | 45 | 25 | 6 | 3 | 1 | 40 | 1 | 2 | 0 | 504 | 53 |

=== International ===
As of match played 10 October 2019

Appearances and goals by national team and year
| National team | Year | Apps | Goals |
|---|---|---|---|
| Argentina | 2014 | 4 | 0 |
| Argentina | 2015 | 6 | 0 |
| Argentina | 2016 | 0 | 0 |
| Argentina | 2017 | 0 | 0 |
| Argentina | 2018 | 3 | 1 |
| Argentina | 2019 | 6 | 1 |
| Total | | 19 | 2 |

Scores and results list Argentina's goal tally first, score column indicates score after each Pereyra goal.

List of international goals scored by Roberto Pereyra
| No. | Date | Venue | Opponent | Score | Result | Competition |
|---|---|---|---|---|---|---|
| 1 | 11 October 2018 | Prince Faisal bin Fahd Stadium, Riyadh, Saudi Arabia | Iraq | 2–0 | 4–0 | 2018 Superclásico Championship |
| 2 | 7 June 2019 | Estadio San Juan del Bicentenario, San Juan, Argentina | Nicaragua | 5–1 | 5–1 | Friendly |

== Honours ==
Juventus

- Serie A: 2014–15, 2015–16
- Coppa Italia: 2014–15, 2015–16
- Supercoppa Italiana: 2015
- UEFA Champions League runner-up: 2014–15

Watford

- FA Cup runner-up: 2018–19

AEK Athens

- Super League Greece: 2025–26

Argentina

- Copa América runner-up: 2015
