= Stephan Lichtsteiner =

Swiss footballer (born 1984)

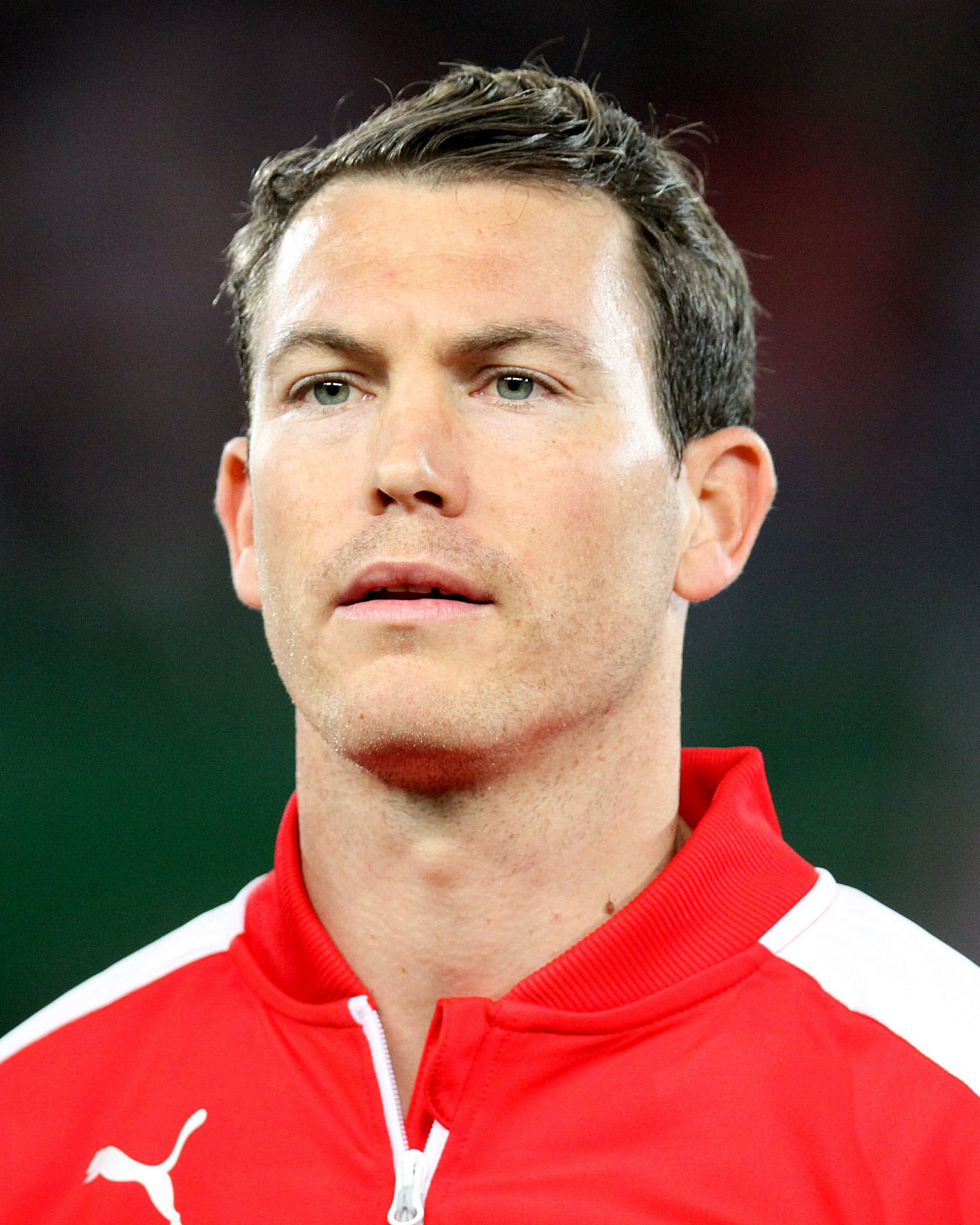
- Lichtsteiner with Switzerland in 2015

Personal information
- Full name: Stephan Lichtsteiner
- Date of birth: 16 January 1984 (age 42)
- Place of birth: Adligenswil, Switzerland
- Height: 1.82 m (6 ft 0 in)
- Position: Right-back

Team information
- Current team: FC Basel (head coach)

Youth career
- 1991–1996: FC Adligenswil
- 1996–2000: FC Luzern
- 2000–2001: Grasshopper

Senior career*
Years	Team	Apps	(Gls)
2001–2005	Grasshopper	79	(4)
2005–2008	Lille	89	(5)
2008–2011	Lazio	100	(3)
2011–2018	Juventus	201	(12)
2018–2019	Arsenal	14	(0)
2019–2020	Augsburg	20	(0)
Total		503	(24)

International career
2003–2005	Switzerland U21	30	(1)
2005–2019	Switzerland	108	(8)

Managerial career
- 2024–2026: FC Wettswil-Bonstetten
- 2026: FC Basel
- * Club domestic league appearances and goals

Stephan Lichtsteiner (Swiss Standard German: [ˈʃtɛfan ˈlɪçtˌʃtaɪnər]; born 16 January 1984) is a Swiss football manager and former professional footballer. He was most recently the head coach of Swiss Super League club FC Basel. An attacking right-back or wing-back during his playing career, he was known for his energetic runs down the right wing, as well as his stamina and athleticism, which earned him the nicknames "Forrest Gump" and "The Swiss Express".

He began his professional career with Grasshopper, winning a league title in 2002–03, and moved to Lille in 2005, helping the French club to Champions League qualification in his first season with the team. In 2008, he joined Italian club Lazio, and won both the Coppa Italia and Supercoppa Italiana the following year. In 2011, he signed for Juventus for a fee of €10 million. He played 257 total games for the Turin side over seven years and won 14 trophies, including the Serie A title in each of his seasons with the team. In the summer of 2018, he was signed by Premier League side Arsenal, where he spent a season before moving to German club Augsburg the following summer. Lichtsteiner announced his retirement from football after one season at the club.

A full international from 2006 to 2019, Lichtsteiner earned 108 caps for Switzerland, making him their third most-capped player of all time. He represented his country at two UEFA European Championships and three FIFA World Cups. In 2015, he was named Swiss Footballer of the Year.

== Early years ==
Lichtsteiner was born in Adligenswil, Canton of Lucerne and played for the local football club. He left home as a teenager to play for Grasshopper Zürich. While living in Zürich he completed a banking apprenticeship with Credit Suisse but ultimately chose a career in football.

== Club career ==
=== Grasshopper ===
Lichtsteiner made his first team debut with Grasshopper Zürich during the 2001–02 season in the former Nationalliga A (now the Swiss Super League) but only made one league appearance. The following season, he began to establish himself as a first team regular and helped the club to the league title.

=== Lille ===
During the 2004–05 season Lichtsteiner sealed a transfer to French side Lille OSC as one of five Swiss players to enter Ligue 1 in the summer of 2005. He became a regular in his first season and helped Lille to a third-place finish to secure a Champions League spot. His last season ended disappointingly as Lille finished seventh in the league and missed out on European football next season by a single point. However, Lichtsteiner ended the season with 4 goals, his highest tally.

=== Lazio ===
After some good performances at UEFA Euro 2008, several clubs, including Paris Saint-Germain and Everton, expressed interest in signing Lichtsteiner. He rejected PSG's bid and, in July, signed a four-year contract with Italian side S.S. Lazio for an undisclosed fee believed to be in the region of €1.5 million as a replacement for fellow Swiss international Valon Behrami, who went to West Ham United. In the April Derby della Capitale against cross-city rivals Roma, he scored his first goal to put Lazio 3–1 up in a heated derby encounter, which ended in a 4–2 win to Lazio, and resulted in numerous bookings. Lichtsteiner himself was also booked for a heated confrontation with Roma defender Christian Panucci, after the Italian had fouled him. During the season, Lichtsteiner formed an attacking tandem down the flanks with Serbian international full-back Aleksandar Kolarov on the other side of the pitch. Although Lazio finished tenth, they ended the season on a high by winning the Coppa Italia, and thus earning a place in the UEFA Europa League the next season. He played a part in Lazio's successful campaign, scoring in the penalty shoot-out against Sampdoria in the final, and also claimed the Supercoppa Italiana at the beginning of the next season. After Kolarov's departure, his future at Lazio became increasingly in doubt, as several clubs expressed interest in him. At the end of the 2010–11 season, he opted not to see out the final year of his contract, despite the Biancocelesti qualifying for the Europa League.

=== Juventus ===
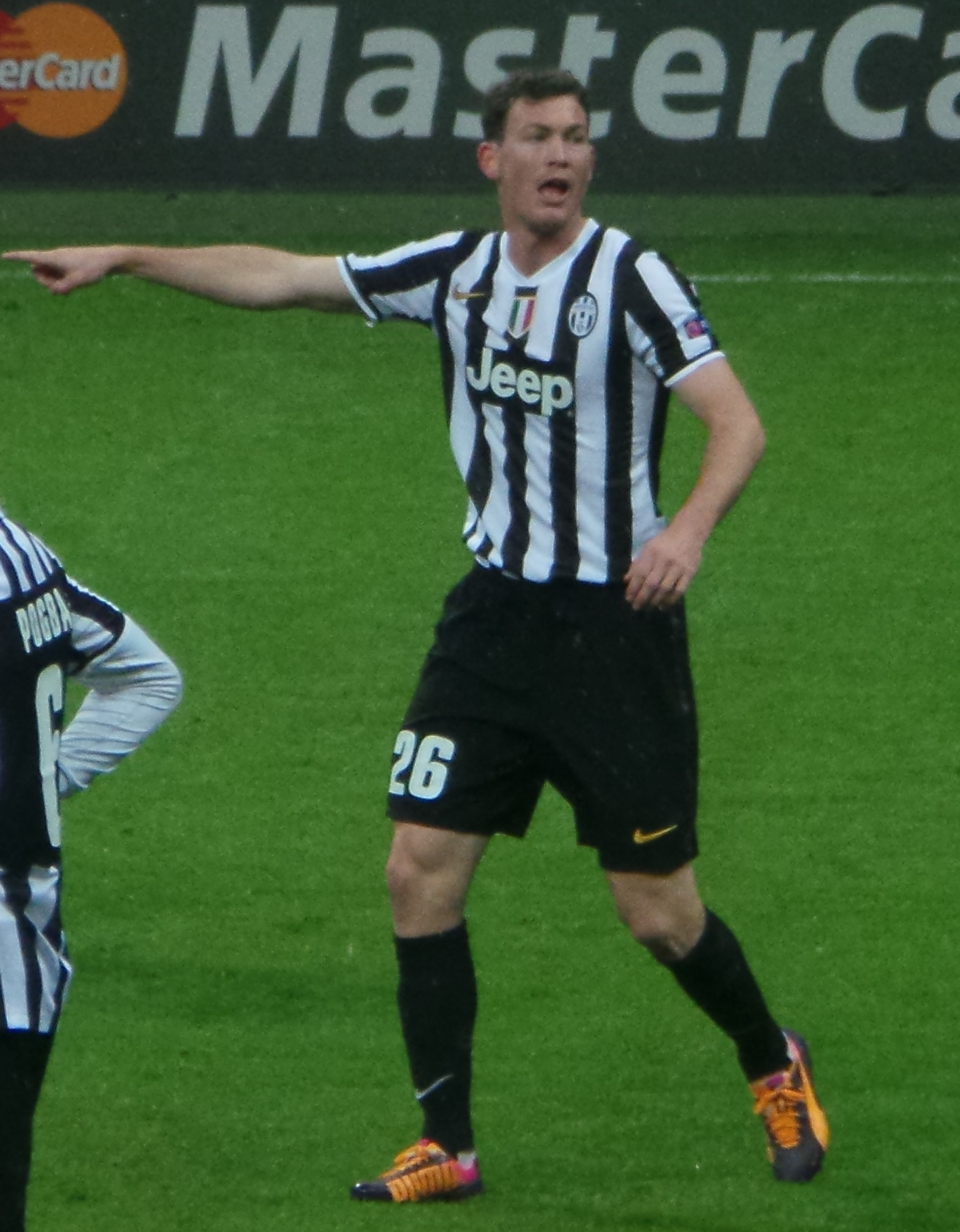
Lichtsteiner playing for Juventus in December 2013

On 27 June 2011, Juventus confirmed that Lichtsteiner had undergone a medical in Turin and reached an agreement with Lazio to pay €10 million in three installments. The transfer was confirmed on 1 July 2011. He marked his debut on 11 September 2011 against Parma by scoring the first goal in the 4–1 home victory, the first league goal to be scored in Juventus' new stadium.

Juventus went on to win the Scudetto and he played a vital part in their strong defensive record, only missing a handful of matches through injury and suspensions. Lichtsteiner repeated his opening matchday feat the following season by converting his left-sided counterpart Kwadwo Asamoah's pass in the 2–0 win. He played fewer matches during 2013–14 season due to injuries but contributed three goals in all competitions and won his third consecutive Serie A title. His crossing and ball-playing ability from the right flank, as well as his ability to make attacking runs to get on the end of Andrea Pirlo's long passes, came to the fore as a right-sided wing-back in Antonio Conte's 3–5–2 formation. As a result, he finished the season as Juventus's top assist-maker in the league, alongside Paul Pogba, with eight.

On 6 June 2015, Lichtsteiner started for Juventus in the 2015 UEFA Champions League Final as the team were defeated 3–1 by Barcelona at Berlin's Olympiastadion; he was involved in Álvaro Morata's temporary equalising goal. On 23 September 2015, Lichtsteiner was substituted at half time during a league match against Frosinone due to breathing difficulty. It was later necessary for heart surgery to be performed to correct cardiac arrhythmia, which caused him to be out for a month. On 3 November 2015, Lichtsteiner returned from injury, starting against Borussia Mönchengladbach in the 2015–16 Champions League and scoring the equalizing goal in the 44th minute of a 1–1 away draw which was later voted one of the best goals of the tournament that season.

At the beginning of the 2016–17 season, Lichtsteiner was excluded from Juventus's squad for the UEFA Champions League group stage; this was due to the fact that the club had signed rightback Dani Alves, and had already filled their squad quota, as Juventus were also required to have four club youth products in the 25-men squad, even though initially the only former youth product in the first team was Claudio Marchisio. Thus, Lichtsteiner was excluded to make way for other players. Juventus had also re-signed Juan Cuadrado on loan, which meant that Lichsteiner would face competition for the starting right fullback/wingback/winger position, leading to rumours that he would be leaving the club; nevertheless, he later stated that he would be remaining with Juventus. Despite competition for a starting spot, Lichtsteiner took part in the 2016 Supercoppa Italiana on 23 December 2016, as one of the starting eleven, as Juventus lost to AC Milan on penalties. On 2 February 2017, Lichsteiner renewed his contract until 30 June 2018.

On 1 September, Licthsteiner was not included in the Juventus's squad for the UEFA Champions League group stage again. On 9 September, Licthsteiner played his first match as team's captain in a 3–0 win against Chievo. On 7 March 2018, Lichtsteiner made his 250th appearance for Juventus in a 2–1 win over Tottenham at Wembley Stadium, in the second leg of the round of 16 of the UEFA Champions League, coming off the bench in the second half to help create Gonzalo Higuaín's goal. He made his 200th Serie A appearance with the club in a 3–1 home win over Bologna on 5 May, after which he announced that he would be leaving the club at the end of the season. On 19 May, Lichtsteiner made his 257th and final appearance for Juventus in the last match of the season in a 2–1 home win over Verona as the club celebrated winning their seventh consecutive league title; during the same match, he missed a penalty, and was given a send-off later during the game when he came off, despite Juventus having already made all three substitutions. In this season, Lichsteiner won his seventh scudetto of his career becoming the non-Italian footballer with the most Serie A won.

=== Arsenal ===
On 5 June 2018, Lichtsteiner signed for Arsenal on a free transfer. He made his Arsenal debut on 12 August, coming on as a substitute in the 35th minute for the injured Ainsley Maitland-Niles in an eventual 2–0 home defeat to Manchester City. On 31 October, Lichtsteiner scored his only goal for Arsenal in the first half of a 2–1 home win over Blackpool in the fourth round of the 2018–19 EFL Cup. On 3 June 2019, it was announced that Lichtsteiner would leave Arsenal after just one season at the club.

=== FC Augsburg ===
On 19 August 2019, Bundesliga side FC Augsburg announced the signing of Lichtsteiner on a free transfer for the 2019–20 season. He made his debut five days later in a 1–1 home draw with 1. FC Union Berlin, becoming the club's oldest ever player at 36 years and six months.

On 12 August 2020, Lichtsteiner announced that he would retire from football.

== International career ==
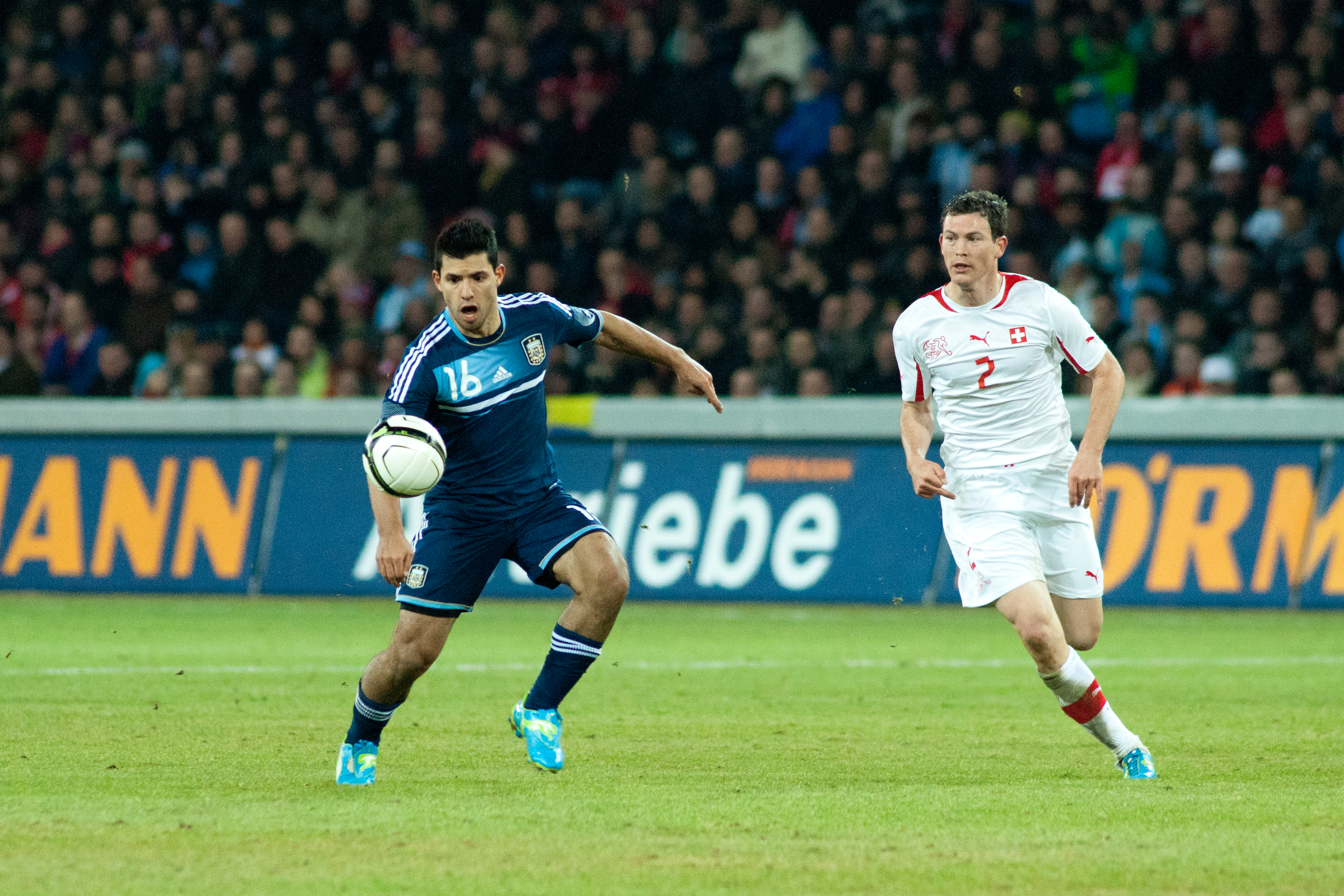
Lichtsteiner defending against Sergio Agüero of Argentina in a 2012 friendly match

A former youth international, Lichtsteiner played in the 1999 U16 and the 2004 U21 European Championships. He was first called up to the senior squad on two occasions in 2005 but was an unused substitute both times. On 11 November 2006, he made his senior debut in a friendly against Brazil which ended in a 2–1 loss.

Although he missed out on the 2006 World Cup, Lichtsteiner was given a chance to prove himself as first choice right back Philipp Degen was out with long-term injury. In May, Köbi Kuhn named him in the squad for the Euro 2008. He played every match at the tournament and eventually replaced Degen as first choice right back. Switzerland ended the tournament with two losses and a win. He retained his starting place under new manager Ottmar Hitzfeld and played every minute in 8 of the 10 2010 World Cup qualifiers.

Lichtsteiner played seven games in UEFA Euro 2012 qualifying, with the Swiss failing to reach the finals in Poland and Ukraine. He scored his first international goal on 11 October 2010 in the final game, a 2–0 win over Montenegro in Basel. In 2014 FIFA World Cup qualification, he played eight full matches in a successful campaign, scoring two first-half goals on 6 September 2013 in a 4–4 draw with Iceland at the Stade de Suisse. Manager Vladimir Petković named him in the 23-man squad for the finals in Brazil, where he played every minute in a run to the last 16.

Due to injury to regular captain Gökhan Inler, Lichtsteiner wore the Swiss armband for the first time on 14 October 2014 in his 70th match, a 4–0 away win over San Marino in UEFA Euro 2016 qualifying. Prior to the finals in France Lichtsteiner was made permanent captain as Inler was dropped due to lack of playing time at club level. The Swiss made it out of the group stage and faced Poland in the Round of 16. With the score at 1–1, the match was decided by penalties, and Lichtsteiner took first and scored but the Swiss lost as Granit Xhaka missed.

In 2018 FIFA World Cup qualification, Lichtsteiner scored in home wins over the Faroe Islands, Andorra and Hungary, as the Swiss qualified through the play-offs. He was named in Petković's 23-man squad for the finals in Russia. On 8 June, in the final warm-up game against Japan, he became the fourth Swiss to earn 100 international caps in the 2–0 victory. He was fined 5,000 Swiss francs after the 2–1 group win over Serbia for joining Xherdan Shaqiri and Granit Xhaka in their controversial goal celebrations and later defended their actions.

== Coaching career ==
=== FC Basel youth ===
On 1 February 2022, Lichtsteiner was appointed as Basel under-15s team coach.

=== FC Wettswil-Bonstetten ===
From July 2024 until January 2026, Lichtsteiner was the head coach of Swiss side FC Wettswil-Bonstetten, who play in the 1. Liga Classic, or Swiss fourth tier.

=== FC Basel ===
On 26 January 2026, Lichtsteiner was appointed as the head coach of Swiss Super League side FC Basel. He signed a contract until 2029, and brought Pascal Bader to the club as his assistant coach. On 9 September 2026, Basel parted ways with Lichtsteiner, citing a lack of development of the squad. In his final game in charge, Basel had lost 1–3 at home to FC Lugano, confirming a worrying trend of weakness at home, as they had lost three out of the first four home games of the 2026–27 season.

== Style of play ==
A dynamic, hard-working, consistent, and versatile defender, Lichtsteiner was capable of playing anywhere along the right flank, and had been deployed as an attacking full-back or wing-back in a four-man back-line, or also as wide midfielder in a 3–5–2 formation. Although he predominantly played on the right, he was also used on the left flank on occasion, or even as a makeshift centre-back. A quick, physically strong, tenacious, and tactically intelligent player, he was known for his energetic runs up and down the wing, which enabled him to exploit spaces and get on the end of long balls, thus enabling him to help out at both ends of the pitch and cover the right flank effectively. His stamina, dedication and athleticism earned him the nicknames "Forrest Gump" and "The Swiss Express". Although not particularly skilful from a technical standpoint, Lichsteiner was capable of linking up with teammates and making attacking runs to get on the end of passes, which enabled him to get into positions from which he could create chances for strikers with crosses from the touchline, or even score goals himself; while he was mainly regarded for his offensive contribution, he was also known for being reliable defensively. However, at times Lichsteiner also drew criticism in the media for lacking composure under pressure, being too rash and aggressive in his challenges, and prone to defensive errors, as well as for being inconsistent in his crossing and distribution from the right wing.

Lichtsteiner has been described by former FIFA referee Jonas Eriksson as the most disagreeable player he has met. According to Eriksson, Lichtsteiner "is angry and grumpy. I try to explain, I try to be humble, but he's hard to make contact with. It creates a bad atmosphere."

== Personal life ==
Lichtsteiner is married to Manuela Markworth, an economist and fitness instructor. They have a daughter and a son. Lichtsteiner acquired the nickname "Forrest Gump" from Lazio-supporting Radio Sei commentator Guido de Angelis after making a run down his flank to score in the 4–2 derby victory over crosstown rivals A.S. Roma. His runs and athleticism has also earned him the nickname "The Swiss Express" since moving to Juventus. In 2021, Lichtsteiner joined the board of directors of ice hockey club HC Lugano.

== Career statistics ==
=== Club ===
Appearances and goals by club, season and competition
Club	Season	League			National Cup		League Cup		Europe		Other		Total	
Club	Season	Division	Apps	Goals	Apps	Goals	Apps	Goals	Apps	Goals	Apps	Goals	Apps	Goals
Grasshopper	2001–02	Swiss Super League	1	0	—		—		—		—		1	0
Grasshopper	2002–03	Swiss Super League	25	0	0	0	—		2 (Note: Appearances in UEFA Cup)	0	—		27	0
Grasshopper	2003–04	Swiss Super League	26	2	4	0	—		4 (Note: Two appearances in UEFA Champions League, two appearances in UEFA Cup)	0	—		34	2
Grasshopper	2004–05	Swiss Super League	27	2	1	0	—		—		—		28	2
Grasshopper	Total		79	4	5	0	—		6	0	—		90	4
Lille	2005–06	Ligue 1	31	1	2	0	2	0	8 (Note: Four appearances in UEFA Champions League, four appearances in UEFA Cup)	0	—		43	1
Lille	2006–07	Ligue 1	24	0	3	0	2	0	3 (Note: Appearances in UEFA Champions League)	0	—		32	0
Lille	2007–08	Ligue 1	34	4	3	1	1	0	—		—		34	5
Lille	Total		89	5	8	1	5	0	11	0	—		113	6
Lazio	2008–09	Serie A	33	1	6	0	—		—		—		39	1
Lazio	2009–10	Serie A	33	2	2	0	—		7 (Note: Appearances in UEFA Europa League)	0	1 (Note: Appearance in Supercoppa Italiana)	0	43	2
Lazio	2010–11	Serie A	34	0	1	0	—		—		—		35	0
Lazio	Total		100	3	9	0	—		7	0	1	0	117	3
Juventus	2011–12	Serie A	35	2	3	0	—		—		—		38	2
Juventus	2012–13	Serie A	28	4	1	0	—		6	0	1	0	36	4
Juventus	2013–14	Serie A	27	2	1	0	—		7 (Note: Three appearances in UEFA Champions League, four appearances in UEFA Europa League)	0	1	1	36	3
Juventus	2014–15	Serie A	32	3	3	0	—		13	0	1	0	49	3
Juventus	2015–16	Serie A	26	0	4	1	—		6	1	1	0	37	2
Juventus	2016–17	Serie A	26	1	2	0	—		1	0	1	0	30	1
Juventus	2017–18	Serie A	27	0	3	0	—		2	0	0	0	32	0
Juventus	Total		201	12	17	1	—		35	1	5	1	257	15
Arsenal	2018–19	Premier League	14	0	1	0	2	1	6	0	—		23	1
FC Augsburg	2019–20	Bundesliga	20	0	0	0	—		—		—		20	0
Career total			503	24	40	2	7	1	65	1	6	1	621	29

=== International ===
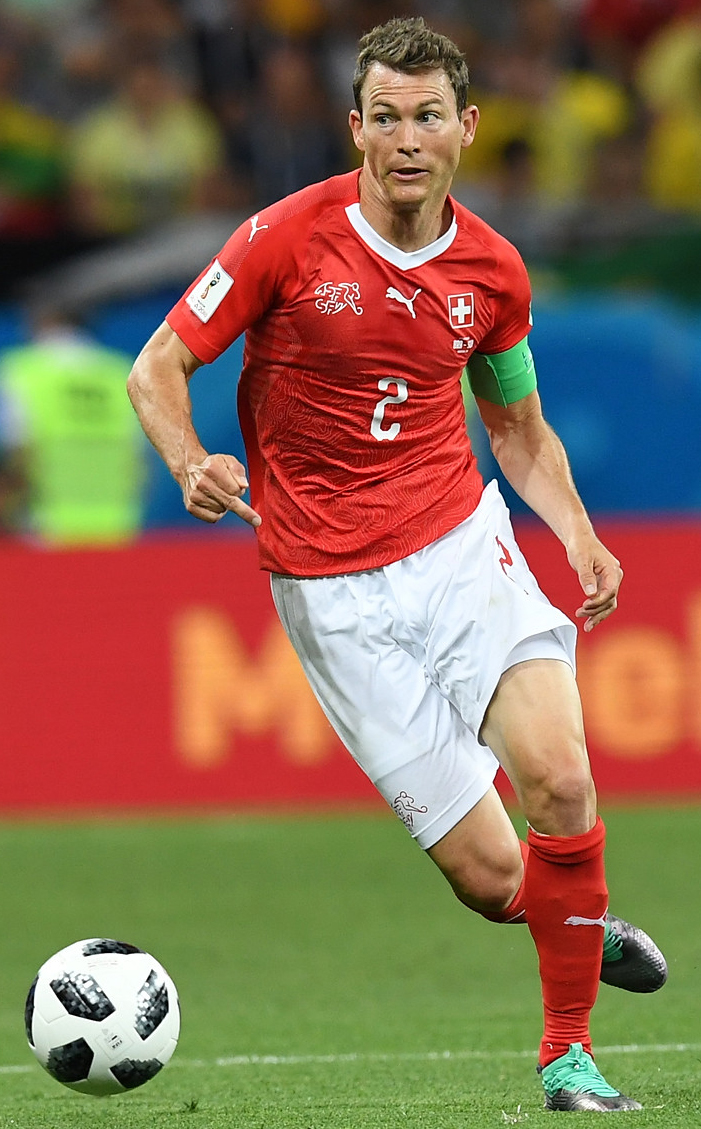
Lichtsteiner with Switzerland at the 2018 FIFA World Cup

Appearances and goals by national team and year
National team	Year	Apps	Goals
Switzerland	2006	1	0
Switzerland	2007	7	0
Switzerland	2008	11	0
Switzerland	2009	6	0
Switzerland	2010	11	0
Switzerland	2011	9	1
Switzerland	2012	9	1
Switzerland	2013	6	2
Switzerland	2014	11	1
Switzerland	2015	8	0
Switzerland	2016	9	1
Switzerland	2017	8	2
Switzerland	2018	8	0
Switzerland	2019	4	0
Total		108	8

Switzerland score listed first, score column indicates score after each Lichtsteiner's goal.

International goals by date, venue, cap, opponent, score, result and competition
No.	Date	Venue	Cap	Opponent	Score	Result	Competition
1	11 October 2011	St. Jakob Park, Basel, Switzerland	43	Montenegro	2–0	2–0	UEFA Euro 2012 qualifying
2	26 May 2012	St. Jakob Park, Basel, Switzerland	47	Germany	4–2	5–3	Friendly
3	6 September 2013	Stade de Suisse, Wankdorf, Bern, Switzerland	59	Iceland	1–1	4–4	2014 FIFA World Cup qualification
4	6 September 2013	Stade de Suisse, Wankdorf, Bern, Switzerland	59	Iceland	3–1	4–4	2014 FIFA World Cup qualification
5	3 June 2014	Swissporarena, Lucerne, Switzerland	63	Peru	1–0	2–0	Friendly
6	13 November 2016	Swissporarena, Lucerne, Switzerland	88	Faroe Islands	2–0	2–0	2018 FIFA World Cup qualification
7	31 August 2017	kybunpark, St. Gallen, Switzerland	91	Andorra	3–0	3–0	2018 FIFA World Cup qualification
8	7 October 2017	St. Jakob Park, Basel, Switzerland	93	Hungary	5–1	5–2	2018 FIFA World Cup qualification

== Managerial statistics ==
As of 6 September 2026

Managerial record by team and tenure
Team	From	To	Record							
Team	From	To	G	W	D	L	GF	GA	GD	Win %
FC Wettswil-Bonstetten	1 July 2024	26 January 2026	50	25	12	13	87	57	+30	50.00
FC Basel	26 January 2026	9 September 2026	27	10	3	14	41	50	−9	37.04
Total			77	35	15	27	128	107	+21	45.45

== Honours ==
Grasshopper

- Nationalliga A: 2002–03

Lazio

- Coppa Italia: 2008–09
- Supercoppa Italiana: 2009

Juventus

- Serie A: 2011–12, 2012–13, 2013–14, 2014–15, 2015–16, 2016–17, 2017–18
- Coppa Italia: 2014–15, 2015–16, 2016–17, 2017–18
- Supercoppa Italiana: 2012, 2013, 2015
- UEFA Champions League runner-up: 2014–15, 2016–17

Arsenal

- UEFA Europa League runner-up: 2018–19

Individual

- Swiss Footballer of the Year: 2015
- UEFA Goal of the Season: 2015–16

== See also ==
- List of footballers with 100 or more caps
