= 2008–09 Udinese Calcio season =

Udinese
2008–09 season
- President: Franco Soldati
- Manager: Pasquale Marino
- Stadium: Stadio Friuli
- Serie A: 7th
- Coppa Italia: Quarter-finals
- UEFA Cup: Quarter-finals
- Top goalscorer: League: Fabio Quagliarella (13); All: Fabio Quagliarella (21)
Home colours	Away colours	Third colours

The 2008–09 season was Udinese Calcio's 14th consecutive and 29th overall season in Serie A. The team competed in Serie A, finishing 7th, and in the Coppa Italia, reaching the quarter-finals. Having finished 7th the previous season also, Udinese competed in the 2008–09 UEFA Cup, where they were eliminated in the quarter-finals.

== Competitions ==
=== Serie A ===
==== League table ====
Pos	Team	Pld	W	D	L	GF	GA	GD	Pts	Qualification or relegation
5	Genoa	38	19	11	8	56	39	+17	68 (Note: Fiorentina finished ahead of Genoa on head-to-head points: Fiorentina 1–0 Genoa, Genoa 3–3 Fiorentina.)	Qualification to Europa League play-off round (Note: Lazio qualified for the play-off round of the 2009–10 UEFA Europa League by winning the 2008–09 Coppa Italia.)
6	Roma	38	18	9	11	64	61	+3	63	Qualification to Europa League third qualifying round
7	Udinese	38	16	10	12	61	50	+11	58	
8	Palermo	38	17	6	15	57	50	+7	57	
9	Cagliari	38	15	8	15	49	50	−1	53	

Source: lega-calcio.it (in Italian)
Rules for classification: 1) points; 2) head-to-head points; 3) head-to-head goal difference; 4) head-to-head goals scored; 5) goal difference; 6) number of goals scored.

==== Results summary ====
Overall								Home						Away					
Pld	W	D	L	GF	GA	GD	Pts	W	D	L	GF	GA	GD	W	D	L	GF	GA	GD
38	16	10	12	61	50	+11	58	11	5	3	36	18	+18	5	5	9	25	32	−7

Last updated: 31 May 2009.
Source: Competitive matches

==== Results by round ====
Round	1	2	3	4	5	6	7	8	9	10	11	12	13	14	15	16	17	18	19	20	21	22	23	24	25	26	27	28	29	30	31	32	33	34	35	36	37	38
Ground	H	A	H	A	H	H	A	H	A	H	A	H	A	H	A	H	A	H	A	A	H	A	H	A	A	H	A	H	A	H	A	H	A	H	A	H	A	H
Result	W	L	D	W	W	W	D	W	W	D	L	L	L	L	L	D	L	D	L	L	W	D	W	D	L	W	D	D	L	L	W	W	W	W	W	W	D	W
Position	3	7	11	6	3	2	2	1	1	2	5	6	7	9	11	11	12	12	13	14	12	12	12	12	12	12	12	12	13	14	13	10	10	9	8	8	8	7

Updated to match(es) played on 31 May 2009. Source: Competitive matches
A = Away; H = Home; W = Win; D = Draw; L = Loss

==== Matches ====
30 August 2008 1	Udinese	3–1	Palermo	Udine
18:00 CEST (UTC+02:00)	Di Natale 9', 34'; Coda (yellow card) 58'; Isla (yellow card) 68'; Inler 70'		Janković (yellow card) 13'; Nocerino (yellow card) 21'; Dellafiore (yellow card) 63'; Bresciano 69'; Miccoli (yellow card) 83'	Stadium: Stadio Friuli; Attendance: 14,295; Referee: Luca Banti

14 September 2008 2	Juventus	1–0	Udinese	Turin
20:30 CEST (UTC+02:00)	Amauri 67'		Ferronetti (yellow card) 14'	Stadium: Stadio Olimpico di Torino; Attendance: 20,320; Referee: Andrea De Marco

21 September 2008 3	Udinese	0–0	Napoli	Udine
15:00 CEST (UTC+02:00)	Inler (yellow card) 62'; Pepe (yellow card) 75'		Vitale (yellow card) 17'; Santacroce (yellow card) 23' (yellow-red card) 73'; Pazienza (yellow card) 82'	Stadium: Stadio Friuli; Attendance: 15,500; Referee: Daniele Orsato

24 September 2008 4	Bologna	0–3	Udinese	Bologna
20:30 CEST (UTC+02:00)	Britos (red card) 13'; Marchini (yellow card) 35'; Terzi (yellow card) 43'; Di Vaio (yellow card) 81'		D'Agostino 14' (pen.); Floro Flores 21'; Sánchez (yellow card) 72'; Pepe 74'; Ferronetti (yellow card) 80'	Stadium: Stadio Renato Dall'Ara; Attendance: 17,322; Referee: Paolo Mazzoleni

28 September 2008 5	Udinese	2–1	Siena	Udine
15:00 CEST (UTC+02:00)	Quagliarella 22'; Pepe 29'		Curci (yellow card) 37'; Kharja 38'; Ficagna (yellow card) 50'	Stadium: Stadio Friuli; Attendance: 13,561; Referee: Luca Marelli

5 October 2008 6	Udinese	2–0	Torino	Udine
15:00 CEST (UTC+02:00)	Luković (yellow card) 13'; Quagliarella 44', 77'; Domizzi (yellow card) 64'		Diana (yellow card) 63'; Natali (yellow card) 71'; Rubin (yellow card) 87'; Ventola (yellow card) 90+4'	Stadium: Stadio Friuli; Attendance: 13,852; Referee: Mauro Bergonzi

19 October 2008 7	Lecce	2–2	Udinese	Lecce
15:00 CEST (UTC+02:00)	Fabiano (yellow card) 20'; Giacomazzi (yellow card) 28'; Tiribocchi 32', (yellow card) 63'; Ariatti (yellow card) 42'; Domizzi 52' (o.g.)		Inler (yellow card) 13'; Domizzi (yellow card) 29'; Pepe (yellow card) 42'; Sánchez 58'; D'Agostino 71'	Stadium: Stadio Via del Mare; Attendance: 8,672; Referee: Andrea Gervasoni

26 October 2008 8	Udinese	3–1	Roma	Udine
15:00 CET (UTC+01:00)	Di Natale 10' (pen.), 51'; Floro Flores 22', (yellow card) 68'; Luković (yellow card) 38'; Isla (yellow card) 57'; Handanović (yellow card) 75'		Tonetto (yellow card) 9'; Vučinić (yellow card) 29'; Cicinho (yellow card) 59'; Totti 75' (pen.), (yellow card) 90'	Stadium: Stadio Friuli; Attendance: 16,134; Referee: Massimiliano Saccani

29 October 2008 9	Catania	0–2	Udinese	Catania
20:30 CET (UTC+01:00)	Sardo (yellow card) 29'; Tedesco (yellow card) 37'; Baiocco (yellow card) 68'		Coda (yellow card) 9'; Sánchez 13'; Handanović (yellow card) 34'; Motta (yellow card) 56'; Isla (yellow card) 67'; Quagliarella 83'	Stadium: Stadio Angelo Massimino; Attendance: 18,759; Referee: Luca Banti

2 November 2008 10	Udinese	2–2	Genoa	Udine
15:00 CET (UTC+01:00)	D'Agostino 4' (pen.), (yellow card) 65'; Ferronetti (yellow card) 10'; Quagliarella 78'		Criscito (yellow card) 3'; Potenza (yellow card) 30'; Milito 63' (pen.); Sculli 67'	Stadium: Stadio Friuli; Attendance: 15,192; Referee: Paolo Tagliavento

9 November 2008 11	Internazionale	1–0	Udinese	Milan
15:00 CET (UTC+01:00)	Cruz (yellow card) 74', (goal) 90+2'; Córdoba (yellow card) 82'		Pepe (yellow card) 33'; D'Agostino (yellow card) 39'; Inler (yellow card) 55'	Stadium: San Siro; Attendance: 51,595; Referee: Emidio Morganti

16 November 2008 12	Udinese	0–1	Reggina	Udine
15:00 CET (UTC+01:00)	Quagliarella (yellow card) 20'; Domizzi (yellow card) 90+2'; Coda (yellow card) 90+3'		Santos (yellow card) 18'; Brienza 60', (yellow card) 89'; Cirillo (yellow card) 79'; Corradi (yellow card) 90+5'	Stadium: Stadio Friuli; Attendance: 14,500; Referee: Paolo Mazzoleni

22 November 2008 13	Fiorentina	4–2	Udinese	Florence
18:00 CET (UTC+01:00)	Dainelli (yellow card) 18'; Vargas (yellow card) 35'; Mutu 52' (pen.); Montolivo 63', 78'; Gilardino 79'; Comotto (red card) 82'		Floro Flores 29'; Pepe (yellow card) 35'; Domizzi (yellow card) 51'; Di Natale 83' (pen.); D'Agostino (yellow card) 83'	Stadium: Stadio Artemio Franchi; Attendance: 28,981; Referee: Daniele Orsato

30 November 2008 14	Udinese	0–1	Chievo	Udine
15:00 CET (UTC+01:00)			Felipe 87' (o.g.)	Stadium: Stadio Friuli; Attendance: 13,898; Referee: Matteo Trefoloni

7 December 2008 15	Atalanta	3–0	Udinese	Bergamo
15:00 CET (UTC+01:00)	Valdés 20'; Doni 78'; C. Vieri 88'			Stadium: Stadio Atleti Azzurri d'Italia; Attendance: 10,218; Referee: Carmine Russo

14 December 2008 16	Udinese	3–3	Lazio	Udine
15:00 CET (UTC+01:00)	Di Natale 9', 55'; Quagliarella 15'		Zárate 60'; Diakité 72'; Ledesma 85'	Stadium: Stadio Friuli; Attendance: 14,000; Referee: Roberto Rosetti

21 December 2008 17	Milan	5–1	Udinese	Milan
20:30 CET (UTC+01:00)	Pato 4', 18'; Kaká 13', 52'; Seedorf 43'		Di Natale 17'	Stadium: San Siro; Attendance: 52,842; Referee: Massimiliano Saccani

11 January 2009 18	Udinese	1–1	Sampdoria	Udine
15:00 CET (UTC+01:00)	Domizzi 62'		Delvecchio 57'	Stadium: Stadio Friuli; Attendance: 14,356; Referee: Paolo Valeri

18 January 2009 19	Cagliari	2–0	Udinese	Cagliari
15:00 CET (UTC+01:00)	Conti 4'; Biondini 20'			Stadium: Stadio Sant'Elia; Attendance: 10,200; Referee: Sebastiano Peruzzo

25 January 2009 20	Palermo	3–2	Udinese	Palermo
15:00 CET (UTC+01:00)	Simplício 18', 54'; Cavani 57'		Pepe 2'; Di Natale 63'	Stadium: Stadio Renzo Barbera; Attendance: 18,812; Referee: Massimiliano Velotto

28 January 2009 21	Udinese	2–1	Juventus	Udine
20:30 CET (UTC+01:00)	Quagliarella 20'; Di Natale 74'; Pasquale (yellow card) 76'		Legrottaglie (yellow card) 11'; Nedvěd (yellow card) 53'; Iaquinta 77' (pen.)	Stadium: Stadio Friuli; Attendance: 23,000; Referee: Paolo Tagliavento

31 January 2009 22	Napoli	2–2	Udinese	Naples
18:15 CET (UTC+01:00)	Hamšík 24' br>Lavezzi 27'		Di Natale 32' (pen.); Quagliarella 45'	Stadium: Stadio San Paolo; Attendance: 37,204; Referee: Andrea Gervasoni

8 February 2009 23	Udinese	1–0	Bologna	Udine
15:00 CET (UTC+01:00)	Sanchez 90+2'			Stadium: Stadio Friuli; Attendance: 14,652; Referee: Gabriele Gava

15 February 2009 24	Siena	1–1	Udinese	Siena
15:00 CET (UTC+01:00)	Maccarone 50'		Di Natale 72'	Stadium: Stadio Artemio Franchi – Montepaschi Arena; Attendance: 9,272; Referee: Riccardo Pinzani

22 February 2009 25	Torino	1–0	Udinese	Turin
15:00 CET (UTC+01:00)	Dellafiore 80'			Stadium: Stadio Olimpico di Torino; Attendance: 16,087; Referee: Andrea De Marco

1 March 2009 26	Udinese	2–0	Lecce	Udine
15:00 CET (UTC+01:00)	D'Agostino 74'; Pasquale 90+3'			Stadium: Stadio Friuli; Attendance: 16,167; Referee: Massimiliano Velotto

7 March 2009 27	Roma	1–1	Udinese	Rome
15:00 CET (UTC+01:00)	Mexès (yellow card) 39'; Panucci (yellow card) 53'; Vučinić 61', (yellow card) 86'; De Rossi (yellow card) 68' (red card) 68'		Di Natale (yellow card) 21'; Felipe 54'; Pepe (yellow card) 57'; D'Agostino (yellow card) 89'; Sánchez (yellow card) 90+1'	Stadium: Stadio Olimpico; Attendance: 37,172; Referee: Paolo Tagliavento

15 March 2009 28	Udinese	1–1	Catania	Udine
15:00 CET (UTC+01:00)	Quagliarella 71'		Mascara 25'	Stadium: Stadio Friuli; Attendance: 16,423; Referee: Paolo Valeri

22 March 2009 29	Genoa	2–0	Udinese	Genoa
15:00 CET (UTC+01:00)	Sculli 58'; Milito 90+4'			Stadium: Stadio Luigi Ferraris; Attendance: 24,871; Referee: Nicola Ayroldi

5 April 2009 30	Udinese	0–1	Internazionale	Udine
19:00 CET (UTC+02:00)	Quagliarella (yellow card) 22'; Pepe (yellow card) 77'		Maxwell (yellow card) 41'; Vieira (yellow card) 69'; Isla 77' (o.g.)	Stadium: Stadio Friuli; Attendance: 25,930; Referee: Luca Banti

12 April 2009 31	Reggina	0–2	Udinese	Reggio Calabria
15:00 CEST (UTC+02:00)			Floro Flores 85', 90+1'	Stadium: Stadio Oreste Granillo; Attendance: 11,153; Referee: Andrea De Marco

19 April 2009 32	Udinese	3–1	Fiorentina	Udine
15:00 CEST (UTC+02:00)	Asamoah 10'; D'Agostino 47' (pen.), 69'		Gamberini (yellow card) 32'; Dainelli 67', (yellow card) 68'; Kuzmanović (yellow card) 89'	Stadium: Stadio Friuli; Attendance: 16,736; Referee: Mauro Bergonzi

26 April 2009 33	Chievo	1–2	Udinese	Verona
15:00 CEST (UTC+02:00)	Pellissier 71'		D'Agostino 35' (pen.), 90+2'	Stadium: Stadio Marc'Antonio Bentegodi; Attendance: 10,821; Referee: Domenico Celi

3 May 2009 34	Udinese	3–0	Atalanta	Udine
15:00 CEST (UTC+02:00)	Quagliarella 43', 73'; Pasquale 88'			Stadium: Stadio Friuli; Attendance: 16,305; Referee: Nicola Pierpaoli

10 May 2009 35	Lazio	1–3	Udinese	Rome
15:00 CEST (UTC+02:00)	Rocchi 56'		Floro Flores 60'; D'Agostino 69'; Quagliarella 86' (pen.)	Stadium: Stadio Olimpico; Attendance: 20,000; Referee: Nicola Stefanini

16 May 2009 36	Udinese	2–1	Milan	Udine
20:30 CEST (UTC+02:00)	D'Agostino 31' (pen.); Zapata 49'		Ambrosini 90+3'	Stadium: Stadio Friuli; Attendance: 27,497; Referee: Nicola Rizzoli

24 May 2009 37	Sampdoria	2–2	Udinese	Genoa
15:00 CEST (UTC+02:00)	Isla 32' (o.g.); Cassano 45' (pen.)		D'Agostino 13' (pen.); Felipe 61'	Stadium: Stadio Luigi Ferraris; Attendance: 21,937; Referee: Domenico Celi

31 May 2009 38	Udinese	6–2	Cagliari	Udine
15:00 CEST (UTC+02:00)	Asamoah 10'; Pepe 11'; Floro Flores 15'; Pasquale 58'; Quagliarella 81'; Ighalo 88'		Acquafresca 55' (pen.); Parola 56'	Stadium: Stadio Friuli; Attendance: 16,717; Referee: Maurizio Ciampi

=== Coppa Italia ===
12 November 2008 Round of 16	Udinese	0–0 (a.e.t.) (8–7 p)	Reggina	Udine
15:00 CET (UTC+01:00)		Report		Stadium: Stadio Friuli; Attendance: 1,251; Referee: Antonio Giannoccaro
	Penalties
	Luković (penalty scored); Obodo (penalty scored); Sala (penalty scored); Motta (penalty missed); Felipe (penalty scored); Nef (penalty scored); Asamoah (penalty scored); Pasquale (penalty missed); Koprivec (penalty scored); Luković (penalty scored)		(penalty scored) Tognozzi; (penalty scored) Ceravolo; (penalty scored) Barillà; (penalty missed) Viola; (penalty scored) Costa; (penalty scored) Rakić; (penalty scored) Basso; (penalty missed) Hallfreðsson; (penalty scored) Marino; (penalty missed) Tognozzi

21 January 2009 Quarter-finals	Udinese	1–1 (a.e.t.) (1–4 p)	Sampdoria	Udine
18:00 CET (UTC+01:00)	Di Natale 63' (pen.)		Pazzini 55'	Stadium: Stadio Friuli; Attendance: 3,700; Referee: Nicola Pierpaoli
	Penalties
	D'Agostino (penalty missed); Di Natale (penalty scored); Pepe (penalty missed)		(penalty scored) Pazzini; (penalty scored) Palombo; (penalty scored) Sammarco; (penalty scored) Gastaldello

=== UEFA Cup ===
==== First round ====
18 September 2008 First leg	Borussia Dortmund (Germany)	0–2	(Italy) Udinese	Dortmund, Germany
20:45 CEST (UTC+02:00)		Report	Floro Flores 8'; Inler 34'	Stadium: Westfalenstadion; Attendance: 52,400; Referee: Stéphane Lannoy (France)

2 October 2008 Second leg	Udinese (Italy)	0–2 (a.e.t.) (2–2 agg.) (4–3 p)	(Germany) Borussia Dortmund	Udine, Italy
20:45 CEST (UTC+02:00)		Report	Hajnal 45+1', 90+2'	Stadium: Stadio Friuli; Attendance: 13,000; Referee: César Muñiz Fernández (Spain)
	Penalties
	Domizzi (penalty missed); Quagliarella (penalty scored); Pepe (penalty scored); Inler (penalty scored); Luković (penalty scored)		(penalty missed) Hajnal; (penalty scored) Şahin; (penalty scored) Kehl; (penalty missed) Błaszczykowski; (penalty scored) Valdez

==== Group stage ====
Pos	Team	Pld	W	D	L	GF	GA	GD	Pts	Qualification
1	(Italy) Udinese	4	3	0	1	6	4	+2	9	Advance to knockout stage
2	(England) Tottenham Hotspur	4	2	1	1	7	4	+3	7	Advance to knockout stage
3	(Netherlands) NEC	4	2	0	2	6	5	+1	6	Advance to knockout stage
4	(Russia) Spartak Moscow	4	1	1	2	5	6	−1	4	
5	(Croatia) Dinamo Zagreb	4	1	0	3	4	9	−5	3	

Source: RSSSF

23 October 2008 1	Udinese (Italy)	2–0	(England) Tottenham Hotspur	Udine, Italy
19:10 CEST (UTC+02:00)	Di Natale 24' (pen.); Pepe 86'	Report		Stadium: Stadio Friuli; Attendance: 22,000; Referee: Felix Brych (Germany)

6 November 2008 2	Spartak Moscow (Russia)	1–2	(Italy) Udinese	Moscow, Russia
18:00 CET (UTC+01:00)	Rodríguez 17'	Report	Quagliarella 12', 60' (pen.)	Stadium: Luzhniki Stadium; Attendance: 12,000; Referee: Kristinn Jakobsson (Iceland)

3 December 2008 3	Udinese (Italy)	2–1	(Croatia) Dinamo Zagreb	Udine, Italy
18:00 CET (UTC+01:00)	Quagliarella 5'; Obodo 79'	Report	Bišćan 90+3'	Stadium: Stadio Friuli; Attendance: 18,000; Referee: Alon Yefet (Israel)

18 December 2008 4	NEC (Netherlands)	2–0	(Italy) Udinese	Nijmegen, Netherlands
20:45 CET (UTC+01:00)	John 75'; Van Beukering 78'	Report		Stadium: Stadion de Goffert; Attendance: 12,500; Referee: Radek Matejek (Czech Republic)

==== Knockout phase ====
===== Round of 32 =====
19 February 2009 First leg	Lech Poznań (Poland)	2–2	(Italy) Udinese	Poznań, Poland
18:00 CET (UTC+01:00)	Rengifo 81'; Arboleda 84'	Report	Quagliarella 50'; Arboleda 55' (o.g.)	Stadium: Stadion Miejski; Attendance: 17,000; Referee: Anton Genov (Bulgaria)

26 February 2009 Second leg	Udinese (Italy)	2–1 (4–3 agg.)	(Poland) Lech Poznań	Udine, Italy
20:45 CET (UTC+01:00)	Pepe 57'; Di Natale 90+1'	Report	Rengifo 13'	Stadium: Stadio Friuli; Attendance: 11,662; Referee: Kevin Blom (Netherlands)

===== Round of 16 =====
12 March 2009 First leg	Udinese (Italy)	2–0	(Russia) Zenit Saint Petersburg	Udine, Italy
20:45 CET (UTC+01:00)	Quagliarella 85'; Di Natale 88' (pen.)	Report		Stadium: Stadio Friuli; Attendance: 20,000; Referee: Eduardo Iturralde González (Spain)

19 March 2009 Second leg	Zenit Saint Petersburg (Russia)	1–0 (1–2 agg.)	(Italy) Udinese	Saint Petersburg, Russia
18:30 CET (UTC+01:00)	Tymoshchuk 34'	Report		Stadium: Petrovsky Stadium; Attendance: 19,500; Referee: Martin Atkinson (England)

===== Quarter-finals =====
9 April 2009 First leg	Werder Bremen (Germany)	3–1	(Italy) Udinese	Bremen, Germany
20:45 CEST (UTC+02:00)	Diego 34', 67'; Almeida 69'	Report	Quagliarella 87'	Stadium: Weserstadion; Attendance: 32,548; Referee: Laurent Duhamel (France)

16 April 2009 Second leg	Udinese (Italy)	3–3 (4–6 agg.)	(Germany) Werder Bremen	Udine, Italy
20:45 CEST (UTC+02:00)	Inler 15'; Quagliarella 30', 38'	Report	Diego 28', 60'; Pizarro 73'	Stadium: Stadio Friuli; Attendance: 25,584; Referee: Martin Hansson (Sweden)
