= 2007–08 Udinese Calcio season =

Udinese Calcio
2007–08 season
- President: Giampaolo Pozzo
- Manager: Pasquale Marino
- Stadium: Stadio Friuli
- Serie A: 7th
- Coppa Italia: Round of 16
- Top goalscorer: Antonio Di Natale (17)
Home colours	Away colours	Third colours

The 2007–08 season was Udinese Calcio's 13th consecutive and 28th Serie A season. The club also competed in Coppa Italia.

== First-team squad ==
Note: Flags indicate national team as defined under FIFA eligibility rules; some limited exceptions apply. Players may hold more than one non-FIFA nationality.

No.	Pos.	Nation	Player
1	GK	BRA	Saulo
2	DF	COL	Cristian Zapata
3	FW	GHA	Asamoah Gyan
4	MF	ITA	Gaetano D'Agostino
5	MF	NGR	Christian Obodo
6	DF	ITA	Andrea Coda
7	FW	ITA	Simone Pepe
8	DF	ITA	Andrea Dossena
10	FW	ITA	Antonio Di Natale
11	NF	ITA	Giampiero Pinzi
14	MF	ITA	Antonio Candreva
15	MF	CHI	Mauricio Isla
17	DF	ITA	Riccardo Colombo

No.	Pos.	Nation	Player
19	DF	BRA	Felipe
20	MF	ITA	Giandomenico Mesto
21	DF	CZE	Tomáš Zápotočný
22	GK	SLO	Samir Handanović
23	MF	FIN	Roman Eremenko
24	DF	SRB	Aleksandar Luković
25	GK	ITA	Antonio Chimenti
27	FW	ITA	Fabio Quagliarella
29	MF	ITA	Raffaele De Martino
32	DF	ITA	Damiano Ferronetti
83	FW	ITA	Antonio Floro Flores
86	FW	BRA	Guilherme Siqueira
88	MF	SUI	Gökhan Inler

== Serie A ==
=== Classification ===
Pos	Team	Pld	W	D	L	GF	GA	GD	Pts	Qualification or relegation
5	Milan	38	18	10	10	66	38	+28	64	Qualification to UEFA Cup first round (Note: The 7th-placed team qualified for the UEFA Cup due to both of the Coppa Italia finalists, Roma and Internazionale, finishing 6th or higher.)
6	Sampdoria	38	17	9	12	56	46	+10	60	Qualification to UEFA Cup first round
7	Udinese	38	16	9	13	48	53	−5	57	Qualification to UEFA Cup first round
8	Napoli	38	14	8	16	50	53	−3	50	Qualification to Intertoto Cup third round
9	Atalanta	38	12	12	14	52	56	−4	48 (Note: Atalanta finished ahead of Genoa on head-to-head points: Genoa 2-1 Atalanta, Atalanta 2-0 Genoa.)	

Source: Serie A
Rules for classification: 1) points; 2) head-to-head points; 3) head-to-head goal difference; 4) head-to-head goals scored; 5) goal difference; 6) number of goals scored.

==== Matches ====
26 August 2007 1	Inter	1–1	Udinese	Milan
15:00 CEST (UTC+02:00)	Stanković 9'		Córdoba 90+2' (o.g.)	Stadium: San Siro; Attendance: 42,300; Referee: Luca Banti

2 September 2007 2	Udinese	0–5	Napoli	Udine
15:00 CEST (UTC+02:00)			Zalayeta 16', 70'; Maurizio Domizzi 41'; Ezequiel Lavezzi 66'; Roberto Sosa 81'	Stadium: Stadio Friuli; Attendance: 10,500; Referee: Andrea Gervasoni

16 September 2007 3	Juventus	0–1	Udinese	Turin
15:00 CEST (UTC+02:00)			Di Natale 47'	Stadium: Stadio Olimpico Grande Torino; Attendance: 20,414; Referee: Stefano Farina
