= 2008–09 UEFA Cup knockout stage =

International football competition

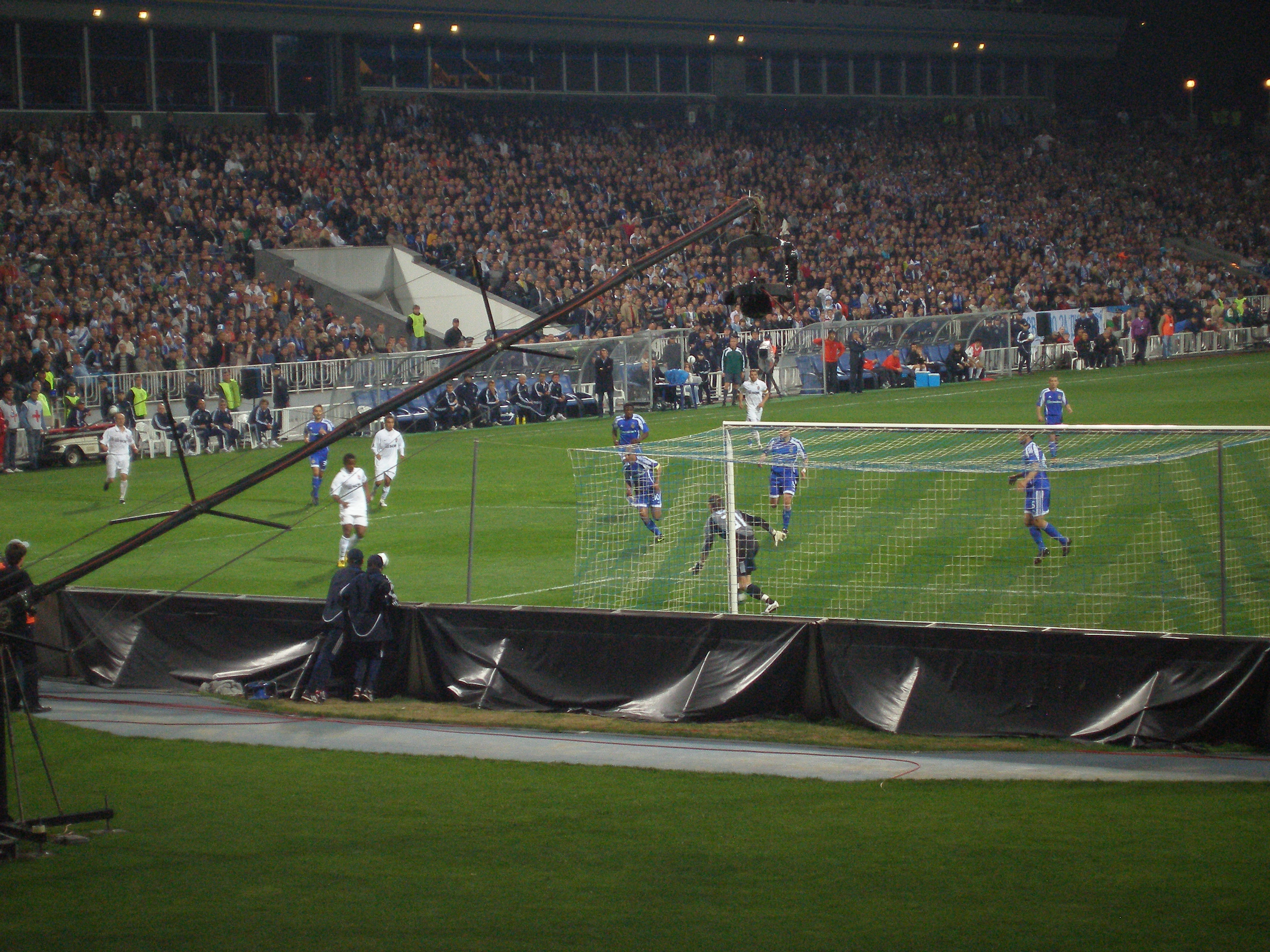
Willian assists Fernandinho to score for Shakhtar Donetsk

The knockout stage of the 2008–09 UEFA Cup began on 18 February 2009, and concluded with the final at the Şükrü Saracoğlu Stadium in Istanbul on 20 May 2009. The final phase involved the 24 teams that finished in the top three in each group in the group stage and the eight teams that finished in third place in the UEFA Champions League group stage.

== Format ==
Each tie in the final phase, apart from the final, was played over two legs, with each team playing one leg at home. The team that had the higher aggregate score over the two legs progressed to the next round. In the event that aggregate scores finished level, the team that scored more goals away from home over the two legs progressed. If away goals are also equal, 30 minutes of extra time were played. If goals were scored during extra time and the aggregate score was still level, the visiting team qualified by virtue of more away goals scored. If no goals were scored during extra time, there would be a penalty shootout after extra time. The draw mechanism for each round is as follows:

- In the draw for the round of 32, matches were played between the winner of one group and the third-placed team of a different group, and between the runners-up of one group and the third-placed team from a Champions League group, with the group winner and runner-up host the second leg. Teams from the same national association or have played in the same group in the group stages cannot be drawn together.
- From the round of 16 onwards, these restrictions did not apply, and teams from same group or same association could be drawn together.

In the final, the tie was played over just one leg at a neutral venue. If scores were level at the end of normal time in the final, extra time was played, followed by penalties if scores had remained tied.

== Qualified teams ==
The knockout stage involved 32 teams: the 24 teams which qualified as the winners, runners-up and third-placed teams of each of the eight groups in the group stage, and the eight third-placed teams from the Champions League group stage.

=== UEFA Cup group stage top-three teams ===
Group	Winners	Runners-up	Third-placed teams
A	(England) Manchester City	(Netherlands) Twente	(France) Paris Saint-Germain
B	(Ukraine) Metalist Kharkiv	(Turkey) Galatasaray	(Greece) Olympiacos
C	(Belgium) Standard Liège	(Germany) VfB Stuttgart	(Italy) Sampdoria
D	(Italy) Udinese	(England) Tottenham Hotspur	(Netherlands) NEC
E	(Germany) VfL Wolfsburg	(Italy) Milan	(Portugal) Braga
F	(Germany) Hamburger SV	(Netherlands) Ajax	(England) Aston Villa
G	(France) Saint-Étienne	(Spain) Valencia	(Denmark) Copenhagen
H	(Russia) CSKA Moscow	(Spain) Deportivo La Coruña	(Poland) Lech Poznań

=== Champions League group stage third-placed teams ===
Group	Third-placed teams
A	(France) Bordeaux
B	(Germany) Werder Bremen
C	(Ukraine) Shakhtar Donetsk
D	(France) Marseille
E	(Denmark) AaB
F	(Italy) Fiorentina
G	(Ukraine) Dynamo Kyiv
H	(Russia) Zenit Saint Petersburg

== Bracket ==
Round of 32
(France) Paris Saint-Germain	2	3	5
(Germany) VfL Wolfsburg	0	1	1
(Portugal) Braga	3	1	4
(Belgium) Standard Liège	0	1	1
(Ukraine) Dynamo Kyiv (a)	1	2	3
(Spain) Valencia	1	2	3
(Italy) Sampdoria	0	0	0
(Ukraine) Metalist Kharkiv	1	2	3
(England) Aston Villa	1	0	1
(Russia) CSKA Moscow	1	2	3
(Ukraine) Shakhtar Donetsk	2	1	3
(England) Tottenham Hotspur	0	1	1
(France) Marseille (p)	0	1	1 (7)
(Netherlands) Twente	1	0	1 (6)
(Italy) Fiorentina	0	1	1
(Netherlands) Ajax	1	1	2
(Germany) Werder Bremen (a)	1	2	3
(Italy) Milan	1	2	3
(Greece) Olympiacos	1	1	2
(France) Saint-Étienne	2	3	5
(Poland) Lech Poznań	2	1	3
(Italy) Udinese	2	2	4
(Russia) Zenit Saint Petersburg	2	2	4
(Germany) VfB Stuttgart	1	1	2
(Netherlands) NEC	0	0	0
(Germany) Hamburger SV	3	1	4
(France) Bordeaux	0	3	3
(Turkey) Galatasaray	0	4	4
(Denmark) Copenhagen	2	1	3
(England) Manchester City	2	2	4
(Denmark) AaB	3	3	6
(Spain) Deportivo La Coruña	0	1	1

Round of 16
(France) Paris Saint-Germain	0	1	1
(Portugal) Braga	0	0	0
(Ukraine) Dynamo Kyiv (a)	1	2	3
(Ukraine) Metalist Kharkiv	0	3	3
(Russia) CSKA Moscow	1	0	1
(Ukraine) Shakhtar Donetsk	0	2	2
(France) Marseille (a.e.t.)	2	2	4
(Netherlands) Ajax	2	1	3
(Germany) Werder Bremen	1	2	3
(France) Saint-Étienne	0	2	2
(Italy) Udinese	2	0	2
(Russia) Zenit Saint Petersburg	0	1	1
(Germany) Hamburger SV	1	3	4
(Turkey) Galatasaray	1	2	3
(England) Manchester City (p)	2	0	2 (4)
(Denmark) AaB	0	2	2 (3)

Quarter-finals
(France) Paris Saint-Germain	0	0	0
(Ukraine) Dynamo Kyiv	0	3	3
(Ukraine) Shakhtar Donetsk	2	2	4
(France) Marseille	0	1	1
(Germany) Werder Bremen	3	3	6
(Italy) Udinese	1	3	4
(Germany) Hamburger SV	3	1	4
(England) Manchester City	1	2	3

Semi-finals
(Ukraine) Dynamo Kyiv	1	1	2
(Ukraine) Shakhtar Donetsk	1	2	3
(Germany) Werder Bremen (a)	0	3	3
(Germany) Hamburger SV	1	2	3

Final
20 May – Istanbul
(Ukraine) Shakhtar Donetsk (a.e.t.)	2
(Germany) Werder Bremen	1

== Round of 32 ==
The draw for the round of 32 took place on 19 December 2008, the day after the final round of UEFA Cup group stage matches.

=== Summary ===
The first legs were played on 18 February and 19 February, and the second leg matches were played on 26 February 2009.

Manchester City were the only team from the first qualifying round to reach the round of 16. Braga were the only team from the Intertoto Cup to reach the round of 16 and were therefore awarded the title of Intertoto Cup winners. Of the eight teams who had been placed in Pot 5 of the group stage draw, only Metalist Kharkiv and Saint-Étienne reached the round of 16. Of the eight teams that entered the Round of the 32 from the UEFA Champions League group stage, two lost: Fiorentina and Bordeaux. Of the eight ties between a third-placed team and a first-placed team from the UEFA Cup group stage, two were won by the third-placed team; the winners were Braga and Paris Saint-Germain.

Team 1	Agg.	Team 2	1st leg	2nd leg
Paris Saint-Germain (France)	5–1	(Germany) VfL Wolfsburg	2–0	3–1
Copenhagen (Denmark)	3–4	(England) Manchester City	2–2	1–2
NEC (Netherlands)	0–4	(Germany) Hamburger SV	0–3	0–1
Sampdoria (Italy)	0–3	(Ukraine) Metalist Kharkiv	0–1	0–2
Braga (Portugal)	4–1	(Belgium) Standard Liège	3–0	1–1
Aston Villa (England)	1–3	(Russia) CSKA Moscow	1–1	0–2
Lech Poznań (Poland)	3–4	(Italy) Udinese	2–2	1–2
Olympiacos (Greece)	2–5	(France) Saint-Étienne	1–3	1–2
Fiorentina (Italy)	1–2	(Netherlands) Ajax	0–1	1–1
AaB (Denmark)	6–1	(Spain) Deportivo La Coruña	3–0	3–1
Werder Bremen (Germany)	3–3 (a)	(Italy) Milan	1–1	2–2
Bordeaux (France)	3–4	(Turkey) Galatasaray	0–0	3–4
Dynamo Kyiv (Ukraine)	3–3 (a)	(Spain) Valencia	1–1	2–2
Zenit Saint Petersburg (Russia)	4–2	(Germany) VfB Stuttgart	2–1	2–1
Marseille (France)	1–1 (7–6 p)	(Netherlands) Twente	0–1	1–0 (a.e.t.)
Shakhtar Donetsk (Ukraine)	3–1	(England) Tottenham Hotspur	2–0	1–1

=== Matches ===
18 February 2009
20:45

Paris Saint-Germain (France)	2–0	(Germany) VfL Wolfsburg
Hoarau 80', 83'	Report

Parc des Princes, Paris
Attendance: 27,447
Referee: Svein Oddvar Moen (Norway)
26 February 2009
19:00

VfL Wolfsburg (Germany)	1–3	(France) Paris Saint-Germain
Hasebe 63'	Report	Luyindula 38' (pen.), 73'; Rothen 60'

Volkswagen Arena, Wolfsburg
Attendance: 20,205
Referee: Vladimír Hriňák (Slovakia)

Paris Saint-Germain won 5–1 on aggregate.

19 February 2009
20:05

Copenhagen (Denmark)	2–2	(England) Manchester City
Almeida 56'; Vingaard 90+1'	Report	Onuoha 29'; Ireland 61'

Parken Stadium, Copenhagen
Attendance: 30,159
Referee: Pavel Kralovec (Czech Republic)
26 February 2009
20:45

Manchester City (England)	2–1	(Denmark) Copenhagen
Bellamy 73', 80'	Report	Vingaard 90+3'

City of Manchester Stadium, Manchester
Attendance: 26,018
Referee: Selçuk Dereli (Turkey)

Manchester City won 4–3 on aggregate.

18 February 2009
20:45

NEC (Netherlands)	0–3	(Germany) Hamburger SV
	Report	Trochowski 41'; Silva 45'; Olić 75'

Stadion de Goffert, Nijmegen
Attendance: 12,500
Referee: Darko Ceferin (Slovenia)
26 February 2009
18:15

Hamburger SV (Germany)	1–0	(Netherlands) NEC
Olić 9'	Report

HSH Nordbank Arena, Hamburg
Attendance: 31,537
Referee: Tony Chapron (France)

Hamburger SV won 4–0 on aggregate.

18 February 2009
20:45

Sampdoria (Italy)	0–1	(Ukraine) Metalist Kharkiv
	Report	Oliynyk 45+3'

Stadio Luigi Ferraris, Genoa
Attendance: 14,774
Referee: Cristian Balaj (Romania)
26 February 2009
18:00

Metalist Kharkiv (Ukraine)	2–0	(Italy) Sampdoria
Valyayev 30'; Jajá 40'	Report

Metalist Stadium, Kharkiv
Attendance: 33,000
Referee: Knut Kircher (Germany)

Metalist Kharkiv won 3–0 on aggregate.

18 February 2009
21:45

Braga (Portugal)	3–0	(Belgium) Standard Liège
Rentería 17'; Leone 27'; Aguiar 84'	Report

Estádio Municipal de Braga, Braga
Attendance: 9,406
Referee: Costas Kapitanis (Cyprus)
26 February 2009
20:45

Standard Liège (Belgium)	1–1	(Portugal) Braga
Mbokani 79'	Report	Aguiar 88'

Stade Maurice Dufrasne, Liège
Attendance: 26,356
Referee: Kristinn Jakobsson (Iceland)

Braga won 4–1 on aggregate.

18 February 2009
20:00

Aston Villa (England)	1–1	(Russia) CSKA Moscow
Carew 69'	Report	Vágner Love 14'

Villa Park, Birmingham
Attendance: 38,038
Referee: Peter Rasmussen (Denmark)
26 February 2009
18:00

CSKA Moscow (Russia)	2–0	(England) Aston Villa
Zhirkov 61'; Vágner Love 90+3'	Report

Luzhniki Stadium, Moscow
Attendance: 25,650
Referee: Felix Brych (Germany)

CSKA Moscow won 3–1 on aggregate.

19 February 2009
18:00

Lech Poznań (Poland)	2–2	(Italy) Udinese
Rengifo 81'; Arboleda 84'	Report	Quagliarella 50'; Arboleda 55' (o.g.)

Stadion Miejski, Poznań
Attendance: 17,000
Referee: Anton Genov (Bulgaria)
26 February 2009
20:45

Udinese (Italy)	2–1	(Poland) Lech Poznań
Pepe 57'; Di Natale 90+1'	Report	Rengifo 13'

Stadio Friuli, Udine
Attendance: 11,662
Referee: Kevin Blom (Netherlands)

Udinese won 4–3 on aggregate.

18 February 2009
18:30

Olympiacos (Greece)	1–3	(France) Saint-Étienne
Đorđević 64' (pen.)	Report	Ilan 12'; Dernis 43'; Gomis 90+1'

Karaiskakis Stadium, Piraeus
Attendance: 33,000
Referee: Lucílio Batista (Portugal)
26 February 2009
20:55

Saint-Étienne (France)	2–1	(Greece) Olympiacos
Payet 45'; Ilan 58'	Report	Óscar 75'

Stade Geoffroy-Guichard, Saint-Étienne
Attendance: 30,511
Referee: Paul Allaerts (Belgium)

Saint-Étienne won 5–2 on aggregate.

19 February 2009
20:45

Fiorentina (Italy)	0–1	(Netherlands) Ajax
	Report	Bakircioglu 60'

Stadio Artemio Franchi, Florence
Attendance: 19,018
Referee: César Muñiz Fernández (Spain)
26 February 2009
20:45

Ajax (Netherlands)	1–1	(Italy) Fiorentina
Leonardo 88'	Report	Gilardino 61'

Amsterdam ArenA, Amsterdam
Attendance: 42,779
Referee: Stefan Johannesson (Sweden)

Ajax won 2–1 on aggregate.

18 February 2009
21:00

AaB (Denmark)	3–0	(Spain) Deportivo La Coruña
Due 53', 71'; Jakobsen 90' (pen.)	Report

Energi Nord Arena, Aalborg
Attendance: 7,987
Referee: Nikolai Ivanov (Russia)
26 February 2009
21:00

Deportivo La Coruña (Spain)	1–3	(Denmark) AaB
Sergio 38'	Report	Shelton 41'; Johansson 45'; Enevoldsen 45+1'

Estadio Riazor, A Coruña
Attendance: 16,000
Referee: Alan Kelly (Republic of Ireland)

AaB won 6–1 on aggregate.

18 February 2009
20:35

Werder Bremen (Germany)	1–1	(Italy) Milan
Diego 84'	Report	Inzaghi 36'

Weserstadion, Bremen
Attendance: 36,151
Referee: Mike Dean (England)
26 February 2009
20:45

Milan (Italy)	2–2	(Germany) Werder Bremen
Pirlo 27' (pen.); Pato 33'	Report	Pizarro 68', 78'

San Siro, Milan
Attendance: 23,280
Referee: Jonas Eriksson (Sweden)

3–3 on aggregate; Werder Bremen won on away goals.

18 February 2009
20:45

Bordeaux (France)	0–0	(Turkey) Galatasaray
	Report

Stade Chaban-Delmas, Bordeaux
Attendance: 21,813
Referee: Claudio Circhetta (Switzerland)
26 February 2009
19:30

Galatasaray (Turkey)	4–3	(France) Bordeaux
Turan 42', 65'; Kewell 45'; Sarıoğlu 90'	Report	Bellion 1'; Chamakh 73'; Cavenaghi 75'

Ali Sami Yen Stadium, Istanbul
Attendance: 19,000
Referee: Craig Thomson (Scotland)

Galatasaray won 4–3 on aggregate.

18 February 2009
18:00

Dynamo Kyiv (Ukraine)	1–1	(Spain) Valencia
Milevskyi 63'	Report	Silva 8'

Lobanovsky Dynamo Stadium, Kyiv
Attendance: 16,800
Referee: Serge Gumienny (Belgium)
26 February 2009
21:30

Valencia (Spain)	2–2	(Ukraine) Dynamo Kyiv
Marchena 45'; Del Horno 54'	Report	Kravets 34', 73'

Mestalla Stadium, Valencia
Attendance: 30,000
Referee: Damir Skomina (Slovenia)

3–3 on aggregate; Dynamo Kyiv won on away goals.

18 February 2009
18:15

Zenit Saint Petersburg (Russia)	2–1	(Germany) VfB Stuttgart
Huszti 2'; Tymoshchuk 45+3'	Report	Gómez 15'

Petrovsky Stadium, Saint Petersburg
Attendance: 17,585
Referee: Björn Kuipers (Netherlands)
26 February 2009
20:45

VfB Stuttgart (Germany)	1–2	(Russia) Zenit Saint Petersburg
Gebhart 80'	Report	Semshov 42'; Fayzulin 86'

Mercedes-Benz Arena, Stuttgart
Attendance: 34,500
Referee: William Collum (Scotland)

Zenit Saint Petersburg won 4–2 on aggregate.

19 February 2009
20:45

Marseille (France)	0–1	(Netherlands) Twente
	Report	Arnautović 22'

Stade Vélodrome, Marseille
Attendance: 22,616
Referee: Stanislav Sukhina (Russia)
26 February 2009
18:30

Twente (Netherlands)	0–1 (a.e.t.)	(France) Marseille
	Report	Ben Arfa 24'
Penalties
N'Kufo (penalty missed); Perez (penalty scored); Janssen (penalty scored); Hersi (penalty scored); Arnautović (penalty scored); Braafheid (penalty scored); Douglas (penalty scored); Rajković (penalty missed)	6–7	(penalty scored) Taiwo; (penalty scored) Niang; (penalty scored) Ben Arfa; (penalty scored) Koné; (penalty missed) Ziani; (penalty scored) Cheyrou; (penalty scored) Bonnart; (penalty scored) M'bami

De Grolsch Veste, Enschede
Attendance: 24,000
Referee: Alon Yefet (Israel)

1–1 on aggregate; Marseille won 7–6 on penalties.

19 February 2009
19:45

Shakhtar Donetsk (Ukraine)	2–0	(England) Tottenham Hotspur
Seleznyov 79'; Jádson 88'	Report

RSK Olimpiyskyi, Donetsk
Attendance: 25,000
Referee: Thomas Einwaller (Austria)
26 February 2009
21:00

Tottenham Hotspur (England)	1–1	(Ukraine) Shakhtar Donetsk
Dos Santos 55'	Report	Fernandinho 86'

White Hart Lane, London
Attendance: 30,595
Referee: Paolo Tagliavento (Italy)

Shakhtar Donetsk won 3–1 on aggregate.

== Round of 16 ==
The draw for the round of 16 took place on 19 December 2008, immediately after the draw for the round of 32.

=== Summary ===
The first leg matches were played on 12 March, and the second leg matches were played on 18 March and 19 March 2009.

Team 1	Agg.	Team 2	1st leg	2nd leg
Werder Bremen (Germany)	3–2	(France) Saint-Étienne	1–0	2–2
CSKA Moscow (Russia)	1–2	(Ukraine) Shakhtar Donetsk	1–0	0–2
Udinese (Italy)	2–1	(Russia) Zenit Saint Petersburg	2–0	0–1
Paris Saint-Germain (France)	1–0	(Portugal) Braga	0–0	1–0
Dynamo Kyiv (Ukraine)	3–3 (a)	(Ukraine) Metalist Kharkiv	1–0	2–3
Manchester City (England)	2–2 (4–3 p)	(Denmark) AaB	2–0	0–2 (a.e.t.)
Marseille (France)	4–3	(Netherlands) Ajax	2–1	2–2 (a.e.t.)
Hamburger SV (Germany)	4–3	(Turkey) Galatasaray	1–1	3–2

=== Matches ===
12 March 2009
20:30

Werder Bremen (Germany)	1–0	(France) Saint-Étienne
Naldo 20'	Report

Weserstadion, Bremen
Attendance: 30,116
Referee: Terje Hauge (Norway)
18 March 2009
20:30

Saint-Étienne (France)	2–2	(Germany) Werder Bremen
Benalouane 64'; Grax 90+2'	Report	Prödl 6'; Pizarro 27'

Stade Geoffroy-Guichard, Saint-Étienne
Attendance: 33,522
Referee: Alexandru Tudor (Romania)

Werder Bremen won 3–2 on aggregate.

12 March 2009
18:00

CSKA Moscow (Russia)	1–0	(Ukraine) Shakhtar Donetsk
Vágner Love 50' (pen.)	Report

Luzhniki Stadium, Moscow
Attendance: 19,700
Referee: Nicola Rizzoli (Italy)
19 March 2009
18:30

Shakhtar Donetsk (Ukraine)	2–0	(Russia) CSKA Moscow
Fernandinho 54' (pen.); Luiz Adriano 70'	Report

RSK Olimpiyskyi, Donetsk
Attendance: 25,000
Referee: Björn Kuipers (Netherlands)

Shakhtar Donetsk won 2–1 on aggregate.

12 March 2009
20:45

Udinese (Italy)	2–0	(Russia) Zenit Saint Petersburg
Quagliarella 85'; Di Natale 88' (pen.)	Report

Stadio Friuli, Udine
Attendance: 20,000
Referee: Eduardo Iturralde González (Spain)
19 March 2009
18:30

Zenit Saint Petersburg (Russia)	1–0	(Italy) Udinese
Tymoshchuk 34'	Report

Petrovsky Stadium, Saint Petersburg
Attendance: 19,500
Referee: Martin Atkinson (England)

Udinese won 2–1 on aggregate.

12 March 2009
20:15

Paris Saint-Germain (France)	0–0	(Portugal) Braga
	Report

Parc des Princes, Paris
Attendance: 35,000
Referee: Matteo Trefoloni (Italy)
19 March 2009
21:30

Braga (Portugal)	0–1	(France) Paris Saint-Germain
	Report	Hoarau 81'

Estádio Municipal, Braga
Attendance: 16,371
Referee: Craig Thomson (Scotland)

Paris Saint-Germain won 1–0 on aggregate.

12 March 2009
18:00

Dynamo Kyiv (Ukraine)	1–0	(Ukraine) Metalist Kharkiv
Vukojević 54'	Report

Lobanovsky Dynamo Stadium, Kyiv
Attendance: 17,800
Referee: Mike Riley (England)
19 March 2009
18:00

Metalist Kharkiv (Ukraine)	3–2	(Ukraine) Dynamo Kyiv
Slyusar 29'; Jajá 56'; Acevedo 70'	Report	Sablić 68'; Berezovchuk 79' (o.g.)

Metalist Stadium, Kharkiv
Attendance: 26,000
Referee: Laurent Duhamel (France)

3–3 on aggregate; Dynamo Kyiv won on away goals.

12 March 2009
20:45

Manchester City (England)	2–0	(Denmark) AaB
Caicedo 8'; Wright-Phillips 30'	Report

City of Manchester Stadium, Manchester
Attendance: 24,502
Referee: Alain Hamer (Luxembourg)
19 March 2009
21:00

AaB (Denmark)	2–0 (a.e.t.)	(England) Manchester City
Shelton 85'; Jakobsen 90+1' (pen.)	Report
Penalties
Jakobsen (penalty scored); Johansson (penalty scored); Augustinussen (penalty missed); Nomvethe (penalty scored); Shelton (penalty missed)	3–4	(penalty scored) Evans; (penalty scored) Elano; (penalty scored) Wright-Phillips; (penalty scored) Dunne

Energi Nord Arena, Aalborg
Attendance: 10,734
Referee: Stéphane Lannoy (France)

2–2 on aggregate; Manchester City won 4–3 on penalties.

12 March 2009
20:45

Marseille (France)	2–1	(Netherlands) Ajax
Cheyrou 19'; Niang 33'	Report	Suárez 36' (pen.)

Stade Vélodrome, Marseille
Attendance: 27,829
Referee: Ivan Bebek (Croatia)
18 March 2009
20:45

Ajax (Netherlands)	2–2 (a.e.t.)	(France) Marseille
Enoh 33'; Sulejmani 74'	Report	Niang 35'; Mears 110'

Amsterdam Arena, Amsterdam
Attendance: 47,650
Referee: Florian Meyer (Germany)

Marseille won 4–3 on aggregate.

12 March 2009
18:00

Hamburger SV (Germany)	1–1	(Turkey) Galatasaray
Jansen 50'	Report	Akman 33'

HSH Nordbank Arena, Hamburg
Attendance: 50,000
Referee: Viktor Kassai (Hungary)
19 March 2009
20:30

Galatasaray (Turkey)	2–3	(Germany) Hamburger SV
Kewell 42' (pen.); Baroš 49'	Report	Guerrero 57', 60'; Olić 90'

Ali Sami Yen Stadium, Istanbul
Attendance: 23,500
Referee: Pedro Proença (Portugal)

Hamburger SV won 4–3 on aggregate.

== Quarter-finals ==
The draw for the quarter-finals took place on 20 March 2009.

=== Summary ===
The first legs were played on 9 April and the second legs were played on 16 April.

Team 1	Agg.	Team 2	1st leg	2nd leg
Hamburger SV (Germany)	4–3	(England) Manchester City	3–1	1–2
Paris Saint-Germain (France)	0–3	(Ukraine) Dynamo Kyiv	0–0	0–3
Shakhtar Donetsk (Ukraine)	4–1	(France) Marseille	2–0	2–1
Werder Bremen (Germany)	6–4	(Italy) Udinese	3–1	3–3

=== Matches ===
9 April 2009
20:45

Hamburger SV (Germany)	3–1	(England) Manchester City
Mathijsen 9'; Trochowski 63' (pen.); Guerrero 79'	Report	Ireland 1'

HSH Nordbank Arena, Hamburg
Attendance: 50,500
Referee: Olegário Benquerença (Portugal)
16 April 2009
20:45

Manchester City (England)	2–1	(Germany) Hamburger SV
Elano 17' (pen.); Caicedo 50'	Report	Guerrero 12'

City of Manchester Stadium, Manchester
Attendance: 47,009
Referee: Nicola Rizzoli (Italy)

Hamburger SV won 4–3 on aggregate.

9 April 2009
20:45

Paris Saint-Germain (France)	0–0	(Ukraine) Dynamo Kyiv
	Report

Parc des Princes, Paris
Attendance: 41,000
Referee: Pieter Vink (Netherlands)
16 April 2009
18:30

Dynamo Kyiv (Ukraine)	3–0	(France) Paris Saint-Germain
Bangoura 4'; Landreau 16' (o.g.); Vukojević 61'	Report

Lobanovsky Dynamo Stadium, Kyiv
Attendance: 16,300
Referee: Frank De Bleeckere (Belgium)

Dynamo Kyiv won 3–0 on aggregate.

9 April 2009
18:30

Shakhtar Donetsk (Ukraine)	2–0	(France) Marseille
Hübschman 39'; Jádson 65'	Report

RSK Olimpiyskyi, Donetsk
Attendance: 25,500
Referee: Felix Brych (Germany)
16 April 2009
20:45

Marseille (France)	1–2	(Ukraine) Shakhtar Donetsk
Ben Arfa 43'	Report	Fernandinho 30'; Luiz Adriano 90+3'

Stade Vélodrome, Marseille
Attendance: 48,268
Referee: Manuel Mejuto González (Spain)

Shakhtar Donetsk won 4–1 on aggregate.

9 April 2009
20:45

Werder Bremen (Germany)	3–1	(Italy) Udinese
Diego 34', 67'; Almeida 69'	Report	Quagliarella 87'

Weserstadion, Bremen
Attendance: 32,548
Referee: Laurent Duhamel (France)
16 April 2009
20:45

Udinese (Italy)	3–3	(Germany) Werder Bremen
Inler 15'; Quagliarella 30', 38'	Report	Diego 28', 60'; Pizarro 73'

Stadio Friuli, Udine
Attendance: 25,584
Referee: Martin Hansson (Sweden)

Werder Bremen won 6–4 on aggregate.

== Semi-finals ==
The draw for the semi-finals took place on 20 March 2009, immediately after the draw for the quarter-finals.

=== Summary ===
The first legs were played on 30 April and the second legs on 7 May.

Team 1	Agg.	Team 2	1st leg	2nd leg
Werder Bremen (Germany)	3–3 (a)	(Germany) Hamburger SV	0–1	3–2
Dynamo Kyiv (Ukraine)	2–3	(Ukraine) Shakhtar Donetsk	1–1	1–2

=== Matches ===
30 April 2009
20:45

Werder Bremen (Germany)	0–1	(Germany) Hamburger SV
	Report	Trochowski 28'

Weserstadion, Bremen
Attendance: 37,500
Referee: Howard Webb (England)
7 May 2009
20:45

Hamburger SV (Germany)	2–3	(Germany) Werder Bremen
Olić 13', 87'	Report	Diego 29'; Pizarro 66'; Baumann 83'

HSH Nordbank Arena, Hamburg
Attendance: 51,000
Referee: Frank De Bleeckere (Belgium)

3–3 on aggregate; Werder Bremen won on away goals.

30 April 2009
18:30

Dynamo Kyiv (Ukraine)	1–1	(Ukraine) Shakhtar Donetsk
Chyhrynskyi 22' (o.g.)	Report	Fernandinho 68'

Lobanovsky Dynamo Stadium, Kyiv
Attendance: 17,000
Referee: Konrad Plautz (Austria)
7 May 2009
18:30

Shakhtar Donetsk (Ukraine)	2–1	(Ukraine) Dynamo Kyiv
Jádson 17'; Ilsinho 89'	Report	Bangoura 47'

RSK Olimpiyskyi, Donetsk
Attendance: 24,300
Referee: Olegário Benquerença (Portugal)

Shakhtar Donetsk won 3–2 on aggregate.

== Final ==
The final was played on 20 May 2009 at the Şükrü Saracoğlu Stadium in Istanbul, Turkey.

20 May 2009
20:45 (21:45 UTC+3)

Shakhtar Donetsk (Ukraine)	2–1 (a.e.t.)	(Germany) Werder Bremen
Luiz Adriano 25'; Jádson 97'	Report	Naldo 35'

Şükrü Saracoğlu Stadium, Istanbul
Attendance: 37,357
Referee: Luis Medina Cantalejo (Spain)
