= 2008–09 UEFA Cup group stage =

The group stage of the 2008–09 UEFA Cup is the second stage of the competition proper. The draw took place on 7 October 2008 at UEFA headquarters in Nyon, Switzerland. Group stage matches began on 23 October 2008 and concluded on 18 December 2008. The top three teams in each group progressed to the Round of 32, to be joined by the eight third-place finishers from the Champions League group stage.

== Teams ==
The following teams qualified for the group stage:

Key to colours
Group winners, runners-up and third-placed teams advanced to round of 32

Pot 1
Team	Coeff.
(Italy) Milan	119.934
(Spain) Sevilla	102.837
(Spain) Valencia	83.837
(Portugal) Benfica	77.176
(Germany) Schalke 04	67.078
(Russia) CSKA Moscow	59.437
(England) Tottenham Hotspur	55.996
(Germany) Hamburger SV	52.078

Pot 2
Team	Coeff.
(Germany) VfB Stuttgart	52.078
(Netherlands) Ajax	51.610
(Greece) Olympiacos	51.525
(Spain) Deportivo La Coruña	46.837
(Belgium) Club Brugge	41.810
(Russia) Spartak Moscow	40.437
(France) Paris Saint-Germain	37.380
(Netherlands) Heerenveen	35.610

Pot 3
Team	Coeff.
(Norway) Rosenborg	35.400
(Italy) Udinese	34.934
(Netherlands) Feyenoord	33.610
(Portugal) Braga	33.176
(Czech Republic) Slavia Prague	31.496
(England) Manchester City	30.996
(Turkey) Galatasaray	30.469
(Italy) Sampdoria	28.934

Pot 4
Team	Coeff.
(Germany) Hertha BSC	27.078
(Serbia) Partizan	25.527
(France) Nancy	25.380
(England) Portsmouth	24.996
(England) Aston Villa	24.996
(Spain) Racing Santander	24.837
(Denmark) Copenhagen	23.748
(Croatia) Dinamo Zagreb	17.836

Pot 5
Team	Coeff.
(France) Saint-Étienne	17.380
(Germany) VfL Wolfsburg	16.078
(Belgium) Standard Liège	14.810
(Netherlands) Twente	14.610
(Netherlands) NEC	12.610
(Ukraine) Metalist Kharkiv	10.932
(Poland) Lech Poznań	6.973
(Slovakia) Žilina	4.070

Pot 1 contained teams ranked between 2 and 39: Pot 2 held teams ranked 40 to 71, Pot 3 held teams ranked 72 to 88, and Pot 4 teams ranked 91 to 122 together with unranked teams from England and Spain. Pot 5 held the remaining teams.

Dinamo Zagreb, and all the Pot 5 teams, had beaten higher-ranked teams in the first round. Lech Poznań and Žilina had also beaten higher-ranked teams in the Second Qualifying Round. Seven of the eight teams in Pot 5 qualified for the Round of 32, Žilina being the only exception. In contrast, only five of the eight teams in Pot 1 managed to do the same, as Sevilla, Benfica and Schalke 04 were eliminated.

== Tie-breaking criteria ==
Based on paragraph 6.06 in the UEFA regulations for the current season, if two or more teams are equal on points on completion of the group matches, the following criteria are applied to determine the rankings:

1. superior goal difference from all group matches played;
2. higher number of goals scored;
3. higher number of goals scored away;
4. higher number of wins;
5. higher number of away wins;
6. higher number of coefficient points accumulated by the club in question, as well as its association, over the previous five seasons.

== Groups ==
Times are CET/CEST, (Note: CEST (UTC+2) for dates up to 25 October 2008 (matchday 1), and CET (UTC+1) for dates thereafter (matchdays 2–5).) as listed by UEFA (local times, if different, are in parentheses).

=== Group A ===
Pos	Team	Pld	W	D	L	GF	GA	GD	Pts	Qualification	MC	TWE	PSG	RSA	SCH
1	(England) Manchester City	4	2	1	1	6	5	+1	7	Advance to knockout stage	—	3–2	0–0	—	—
2	(Netherlands) Twente	4	2	0	2	5	8	−3	6	Advance to knockout stage	—	—	—	1–0	2–1
3	(France) Paris Saint-Germain	4	1	2	1	7	5	+2	5	Advance to knockout stage	—	4–0	—	2–2	—
4	(Spain) Racing Santander	4	1	2	1	6	5	+1	5		3–1	—	—	—	1–1
5	(Germany) Schalke 04	4	1	1	2	5	6	−1	4		0–2	—	3–1	—	—

Source: RSSSF
23 October 2008
18:15

Schalke 04 (Germany)	3–1	(France) Paris Saint-Germain
Mabiala 12' (o.g.); Kurányi 39'; Altıntop 70'	Report	Chantôme 90+2'

Veltins-Arena, Gelsenkirchen
Attendance: 48,919
Referee: Gianluca Rocchi (Italy)
23 October 2008
20:00

Twente (Netherlands)	1–0	(Spain) Racing Santander
Denneboom 7'	Report

De Grolsch Veste, Enschede
Attendance: 21,000
Referee: Alan Kelly (Republic of Ireland)

6 November 2008
20:45

Racing Santander (Spain)	1–1	(Germany) Schalke 04
Tchité 57'	Report	Engelaar 61'

Estadio El Sardinero, Santander
Attendance: 15,505
Referee: Stefan Johannesson (Sweden)
6 November 2008
20:45 (19:45 UTC+0)

Manchester City (England)	3–2	(Netherlands) Twente
Wright-Phillips 2'; Robinho 57'; Benjani 62'	Report	Elia 17'; Wielaert 65'

City of Manchester Stadium, Manchester
Attendance: 21,247
Referee: Nikolai Ivanov (Russia)

27 November 2008
19:00

Schalke 04 (Germany)	0–2	(England) Manchester City
	Report	Benjani 32'; Ireland 66'

Veltins-Arena, Gelsenkirchen
Attendance: 54,142
Referee: Alexandru Tudor (Romania)
27 November 2008
20:45

Paris Saint-Germain (France)	2–2	(Spain) Racing Santander
Kežman 5'; Luyindula 32'	Report	Traoré 40' (o.g.); Colsa 55'

Parc des Princes, Paris
Attendance: 25,000
Referee: Pavel Kralovec (Czech Republic)

3 December 2008
20:45 (19:45 UTC+0)

Manchester City (England)	0–0	(France) Paris Saint-Germain
	Report

City of Manchester Stadium, Manchester
Attendance: 25,626
Referee: Bruno Paixão (Portugal)
3 December 2008
20:45

Twente (Netherlands)	2–1	(Germany) Schalke 04
Wielaert 3'; Perez 55'	Report	Asamoah 77'

De Grolsch Veste, Enschede
Attendance: 24,000
Referee: Cüneyt Çakır (Turkey)

18 December 2008
20:45

Paris Saint-Germain (France)	4–0	(Netherlands) Twente
Luyindula 8', 86'; Sessègnon 23'; Kežman 84'	Report

Parc des Princes, Paris
Attendance: 30,000
Referee: Iain Brines (Scotland)
18 December 2008
20:45

Racing Santander (Spain)	3–1	(England) Manchester City
Pereira 20'; Serrano 30'; Valera 54'	Report	Caicedo 90+2'

Estadio El Sardinero, Santander
Attendance: 18,360
Referee: Serge Gumienny (Belgium)

=== Group B ===
Pos	Team	Pld	W	D	L	GF	GA	GD	Pts	Qualification	MET	GAL	OLY	HER	BEN
1	(Ukraine) Metalist Kharkiv	4	3	1	0	3	0	+3	10	Advance to knockout stage	—	—	1–0	0–0	—
2	(Turkey) Galatasaray	4	3	0	1	4	1	+3	9	Advance to knockout stage	0–1	—	1–0	—	—
3	(Greece) Olympiacos	4	2	0	2	9	3	+6	6	Advance to knockout stage	—	—	—	4–0	5–1
4	(Germany) Hertha BSC	4	0	2	2	1	6	−5	2		—	0–1	—	—	1–1
5	(Portugal) Benfica	4	0	1	3	2	9	−7	1		0–1	0–2	—	—	—

Source: RSSSF
23 October 2008
20:15 (21:15 UTC+3)

Galatasaray (Turkey)	1–0	(Greece) Olympiacos
Kewell 25'	Report

Ali Sami Yen Stadium, Istanbul
Attendance: 23,500
Referee: Eduardo Iturralde González (Spain)
23 October 2008
20:30

Hertha BSC (Germany)	1–1	(Portugal) Benfica
Pantelić 74'	Report	Di María 51'

Olympiastadion, Berlin
Attendance: 26,144
Referee: Paul Allaerts (Belgium)

6 November 2008
18:00 (19:00 UTC+2)

Metalist Kharkiv (Ukraine)	0–0	(Germany) Hertha BSC
	Report

Metalist Stadium, Kharkiv
Attendance: 35,000
Referee: Bjorn Kuipers (Netherlands)
6 November 2008
20:30 (19:30 UTC+0)

Benfica (Portugal)	0–2	(Turkey) Galatasaray
	Report	Aşık 51'; Karan 69'

Estádio da Luz, Lisbon
Attendance: 47,000
Referee: Martin Atkinson (England)

27 November 2008
19:00 (20:00 UTC+2)

Galatasaray (Turkey)	0–1	(Ukraine) Metalist Kharkiv
	Report	Edmar 81'

Ali Sami Yen Stadium, Istanbul
Attendance: 20,000
Referee: Jacek Granat (Poland)
27 November 2008
19:45 (20:45 UTC+2)

Olympiacos (Greece)	5–1	(Portugal) Benfica
Galletti 1'; Patsatzoglou 17'; Diogo 24', 53'; Belluschi 44'	Report	David Luiz 33'

Karaiskakis Stadium, Piraeus
Attendance: 30,185
Referee: Stéphane Lannoy (France)

3 December 2008
20:45 (21:45 UTC+2)

Metalist Kharkiv (Ukraine)	1–0	(Greece) Olympiacos
Edmar 88'	Report

Metalist Stadium, Kharkiv
Attendance: 15,000
Referee: William Collum (Scotland)
3 December 2008
20:45

Hertha BSC (Germany)	0–1	(Turkey) Galatasaray
	Report	Baroš 69' (pen.)

Olympiastadion, Berlin
Attendance: 62,612
Referee: Nicola Rizzoli (Italy)

18 December 2008
19:45 (20:45 UTC+2)

Olympiacos (Greece)	4–0	(Germany) Hertha BSC
Dudu 55'; Galletti 68' (pen.); Torosidis 87'; Diogo 88'	Report

Karaiskakis Stadium, Piraeus
Attendance: 30,063
Referee: Martin Hansson (Sweden)
18 December 2008
20:45 (19:45 UTC+0)

Benfica (Portugal)	0–1	(Ukraine) Metalist Kharkiv
	Report	Rykun 84'

Estádio da Luz, Lisbon
Attendance: 9,570
Referee: Bernhard Brugger (Austria)

=== Group C ===
Pos	Team	Pld	W	D	L	GF	GA	GD	Pts	Qualification	STD	STU	SAM	SEV	PTZ
1	(Belgium) Standard Liège	4	3	0	1	5	3	+2	9	Advance to knockout stage	—	—	3–0	1–0	—
2	(Germany) VfB Stuttgart	4	2	1	1	6	3	+3	7	Advance to knockout stage	3–0	—	—	—	2–0
3	(Italy) Sampdoria	4	2	1	1	4	5	−1	7	Advance to knockout stage	—	1–1	—	1–0	—
4	(Spain) Sevilla	4	2	0	2	5	2	+3	6		—	2–0	—	—	3–0
5	(Serbia) Partizan	4	0	0	4	1	8	−7	0		0–1	—	1–2	—	—

Source: RSSSF
23 October 2008
20:45

Sevilla (Spain)	2–0	(Germany) VfB Stuttgart
Romaric 15'; Renato 16'	Report

Ramón Sánchez Pizjuán Stadium, Seville
Attendance: 45,000
Referee: Stanislav Sukhina (Russia)
23 October 2008
21:00

Partizan (Serbia)	1–2	(Italy) Sampdoria
Diarra 34'	Report	Bonazzoli 20'; Dessena 55'

Partizan Stadium, Belgrade
Attendance: 23,780
Referee: Lucílio Batista (Portugal)

6 November 2008
18:00

VfB Stuttgart (Germany)	2–0	(Serbia) Partizan
Gómez 77', 80'	Report

Mercedes-Benz Arena, Stuttgart
Attendance: 20,500
Referee: Pavel Kralovec (Czech Republic)
6 November 2008
20:45

Standard Liège (Belgium)	1–0	(Spain) Sevilla
Mbokani 38'	Report

Stade Maurice Dufrasne, Liège
Attendance: 26,500
Referee: Claudio Circhetta (Switzerland)

27 November 2008
20:45

Sampdoria (Italy)	1–1	(Germany) VfB Stuttgart
Sammarco 39'	Report	Marica 8'

Stadio Luigi Ferraris, Genoa
Attendance: 15,000
Referee: Damir Skomina (Slovenia)
27 November 2008
20:45

Partizan (Serbia)	0–1	(Belgium) Standard Liège
	Report	De Camargo 36'

Partizan Stadium, Belgrade
Attendance: 14,210
Referee: Mike Dean (England)

3 December 2008
20:45

Standard Liège (Belgium)	3–0	(Italy) Sampdoria
De Camargo 23'; Onyewu 35'; Jovanović 43'	Report

Stade Maurice Dufrasne, Liège
Attendance: 26,833
Referee: Tony Chapron (France)
3 December 2008
20:45

Sevilla (Spain)	3–0	(Serbia) Partizan
Luís Fabiano 32' (pen.), 73'; Renato 46'	Report

Ramón Sánchez Pizjuán Stadium, Seville
Attendance: 25,000
Referee: Vladimír Hriňák (Slovakia)

18 December 2008
20:45

Sampdoria (Italy)	1–0	(Spain) Sevilla
Bottinelli 75'	Report

Stadio Luigi Ferraris, Genoa
Attendance: 15,000
Referee: Howard Webb (England)
18 December 2008
20:45

VfB Stuttgart (Germany)	3–0	(Belgium) Standard Liège
Khedira 5'; Hilbert 49'; Marica 72'	Report

Mercedes-Benz Arena, Stuttgart
Attendance: 28,000
Referee: Peter Rasmussen (Denmark)

=== Group D ===
Pos	Team	Pld	W	D	L	GF	GA	GD	Pts	Qualification	UDI	TOT	NEC	SPA	DZ
1	(Italy) Udinese	4	3	0	1	6	4	+2	9	Advance to knockout stage	—	2–0	—	—	2–1
2	(England) Tottenham Hotspur	4	2	1	1	7	4	+3	7	Advance to knockout stage	—	—	—	2–2	4–0
3	(Netherlands) NEC	4	2	0	2	6	5	+1	6	Advance to knockout stage	2–0	0–1	—	—	—
4	(Russia) Spartak Moscow	4	1	1	2	5	6	−1	4		1–2	—	1–2	—	—
5	(Croatia) Dinamo Zagreb	4	1	0	3	4	9	−5	3		—	—	3–2	0–1	—

Source: RSSSF
23 October 2008
19:10

Udinese (Italy)	2–0	(England) Tottenham Hotspur
Di Natale 24' (pen.); Pepe 86'	Report

Stadio Friuli, Udine
Attendance: 22,000
Referee: Felix Brych (Germany)
23 October 2008
20:45

Dinamo Zagreb (Croatia)	3–2	(Netherlands) NEC
Mandžukić 3'; Balaban 81'; Vrdoljak 84'	Report	Carlos 24' (o.g.); Janssen 78'

Maksimir Stadium, Zagreb
Attendance: 15,000
Referee: Oleh Oriekhov (Ukraine)

6 November 2008
18:00 (20:00 UTC+3)

Spartak Moscow (Russia)	1–2	(Italy) Udinese
Rodríguez 17'	Report	Quagliarella 12', 60' (pen.)

Luzhniki Stadium, Moscow
Attendance: 12,000
Referee: Kristinn Jakobsson (Iceland)
6 November 2008
21:00 (20:00 UTC+0)

Tottenham Hotspur (England)	4–0	(Croatia) Dinamo Zagreb
Bent 30', 33', 70'; Huddlestone 59'	Report

White Hart Lane, London
Attendance: 16,295
Referee: Fredy Fautrel (France)

27 November 2008
19:00

NEC (Netherlands)	0–1	(England) Tottenham Hotspur
	Report	O'Hara 14'

Stadion de Goffert, Nijmegen
Attendance: 12,500
Referee: César Muñiz Fernández (Spain)
27 November 2008
20:45

Dinamo Zagreb (Croatia)	0–1	(Russia) Spartak Moscow
	Report	Saenko 75'

Maksimir Stadium, Zagreb
Attendance: 12,000
Referee: Thorsten Kinhöfer (Germany)

3 December 2008
18:00 (20:00 UTC+3)

Spartak Moscow (Russia)	1–2	(Netherlands) NEC
Covalciuc 2'	Report	Van Beukering 84'; Schöne 87'

Luzhniki Stadium, Moscow
Attendance: 12,000
Referee: Nicolai Vollquartz (Denmark)
3 December 2008
18:00

Udinese (Italy)	2–1	(Croatia) Dinamo Zagreb
Quagliarella 5'; Obodo 79'	Report	Bišćan 90+3'

Stadio Friuli, Udine
Attendance: 18,000
Referee: Alon Yefet (Israel)

18 December 2008
20:45

NEC (Netherlands)	2–0	(Italy) Udinese
John 75'; Van Beukering 78'	Report

Stadion de Goffert, Nijmegen
Attendance: 12,500
Referee: Radek Matejek (Czech Republic)
18 December 2008
20:45 (19:45 UTC+0)

Tottenham Hotspur (England)	2–2	(Russia) Spartak Moscow
Modrić 67'; Huddlestone 74'	Report	Dzyuba 23', 33'

White Hart Lane, London
Attendance: 28,906
Referee: Pedro Proença (Portugal)

=== Group E ===
Pos	Team	Pld	W	D	L	GF	GA	GD	Pts	Qualification	WOL	ACM	BRA	POR	HVN
1	(Germany) VfL Wolfsburg	4	3	1	0	13	7	+6	10	Advance to knockout stage	—	—	—	3–2	5–1
2	(Italy) Milan	4	2	2	0	8	5	+3	8	Advance to knockout stage	2–2	—	1–0	—	—
3	(Portugal) Braga	4	2	0	2	7	5	+2	6	Advance to knockout stage	2–3	—	—	3–0	—
4	(England) Portsmouth	4	1	1	2	7	8	−1	4		—	2–2	—	—	3–0
5	(Netherlands) Heerenveen	4	0	0	4	3	13	−10	0		—	1–3	1–2	—	—

Source: RSSSF
23 October 2008
20:45

Heerenveen (Netherlands)	1–3	(Italy) Milan
Pranjić 86' (pen.)	Report	Jong-a-Pin 19' (o.g.); Gattuso 23'; Inzaghi 69'

Abe Lenstra Stadion, Heerenveen
Attendance: 25,600
Referee: Julian Rodriguez Santiago (Spain)
23 October 2008
21:15 (20:15 UTC+1)

Braga (Portugal)	3–0	(England) Portsmouth
Aguiar 8'; Rentería 46'; Alan 87'	Report

Estádio AXA, Braga
Attendance: 12,000
Referee: Darko Ceferin (Slovenia)

6 November 2008
19:45

VfL Wolfsburg (Germany)	5–1	(Netherlands) Heerenveen
Džeko 34', 61'; Grafite 39'; Misimović 53'; Krzynówek 71'	Report	Väyrynen 31'

Volkswagen Arena, Wolfsburg
Attendance: 15,615
Referee: Jonas Eriksson (Sweden)
6 November 2008
20:45

Milan (Italy)	1–0	(Portugal) Braga
Ronaldinho 90+3'	Report

San Siro, Milan
Attendance: 10,608
Referee: Peter Rasmussen (Denmark)

27 November 2008
21:05 (20:05 UTC+0)

Portsmouth (England)	2–2	(Italy) Milan
Kaboul 62'; Kanu 73'	Report	Ronaldinho 84'; Inzaghi 90+2'

Fratton Park, Portsmouth
Attendance: 20,403
Referee: Serge Gumienny (Belgium)
27 November 2008
22:30 (21:30 UTC+0)

Braga (Portugal)	2–3	(Germany) VfL Wolfsburg
Barzagli 6' (o.g.); Meyong 49'	Report	Džeko 24'; Misimović 83' (pen.), 90+4'

Estádio AXA, Braga
Attendance: 7,294
Referee: Anton Genov (Bulgaria)

4 December 2008
20:45

VfL Wolfsburg (Germany)	3–2	(England) Portsmouth
Džeko 3'; Gentner 23'; Misimović 74'	Report	Defoe 11'; Mvuemba 14'

Volkswagen Arena, Wolfsburg
Attendance: 21,015
Referee: Ivan Bebek (Croatia)
4 December 2008
20:45

Heerenveen (Netherlands)	1–2	(Portugal) Braga
Sibon 19'	Report	Rentería 35'; Aguiar 56'

Abe Lenstra Stadion, Heerenveen
Attendance: 25,500
Referee: Fritz Stuchlik (Austria)

17 December 2008
20:45 (19:45 UTC+0)

Portsmouth (England)	3–0	(Netherlands) Heerenveen
Crouch 40', 42'; Hreiðarsson 90'	Report

Fratton Park, Portsmouth
Attendance: 19,612
Referee: Richard Havrilla (Slovakia)
17 December 2008
20:45

Milan (Italy)	2–2	(Germany) VfL Wolfsburg
Ambrosini 17'; Pato 56'	Report	Zaccardo 56'; Sağlık 81'

San Siro, Milan
Attendance: 5,420
Referee: Mark Courtney (Northern Ireland)

=== Group F ===
Pos	Team	Pld	W	D	L	GF	GA	GD	Pts	Qualification	HSV	AJA	AST	ZIL	SLA
1	(Germany) Hamburger SV	4	3	0	1	7	3	+4	9	Advance to knockout stage	—	0–1	3–1	—	—
2	(Netherlands) Ajax	4	2	1	1	5	4	+1	7	Advance to knockout stage	—	—	—	1–0	2–2
3	(England) Aston Villa	4	2	0	2	5	6	−1	6	Advance to knockout stage	—	2–1	—	1–2	—
4	(Slovakia) Žilina	4	1	1	2	3	4	−1	4		1–2	—	—	—	0–0
5	(Czech Republic) Slavia Prague	4	0	2	2	2	5	−3	2		0–2	—	0–1	—	—

Source: RSSSF
23 October 2008
18:30

Žilina (Slovakia)	1–2	(Germany) Hamburger SV
Rilke 69'	Report	Petrić 15'; Olić 45+1'

Stadium Pod Dubňom, Žilina
Attendance: 9,871
Referee: Tony Asumaa (Finland)
23 October 2008
21:15 (20:15 UTC+1)

Aston Villa (England)	2–1	(Netherlands) Ajax
Laursen 8'; Barry 45'	Report	Vermaelen 22'

Villa Park, Birmingham
Attendance: 36,657
Referee: Thomas Einwaller (Austria)

6 November 2008
20:45

Ajax (Netherlands)	1–0	(Slovakia) Žilina
Suárez 41'	Report

Amsterdam Arena, Amsterdam
Attendance: 24,200
Referee: Douglas McDonald (Scotland)
6 November 2008
20:45

Slavia Prague (Czech Republic)	0–1	(England) Aston Villa
	Report	Carew 26'

Synot Tip Arena, Prague
Attendance: 20,322
Referee: Costas Kapitanis (Cyprus)

27 November 2008
18:30

Žilina (Slovakia)	0–0	(Czech Republic) Slavia Prague
	Report

Stadium Pod Dubňom, Žilina
Attendance: 8,789
Referee: Aleksandar Stavrev (Macedonia)
27 November 2008
21:00

Hamburger SV (Germany)	0–1	(Netherlands) Ajax
	Report	Leonardo 77'

HSH Nordbank Arena, Hamburg
Attendance: 51,200
Referee: Paolo Tagliavento (Italy)

4 December 2008
20:45

Slavia Prague (Czech Republic)	0–2	(Germany) Hamburger SV
	Report	Olić 30'; Petrić 90+1' (pen.)

Synot Tip Arena, Prague
Attendance: 17,368
Referee: Selçuk Dereli (Turkey)
4 December 2008
20:45 (19:45 UTC+0)

Aston Villa (England)	1–2	(Slovakia) Žilina
Delfouneso 28'	Report	Leitner 16'; Štyvar 19'

Villa Park, Birmingham
Attendance: 28,797
Referee: Espen Berntsen (Norway)

17 December 2008
20:45

Hamburger SV (Germany)	3–1	(England) Aston Villa
Petrić 18'; Olić 30', 57'	Report	Delfouneso 83'

HSH Nordbank Arena, Hamburg
Attendance: 49,121
Referee: Aleksei Nikolaev (Russia)
17 December 2008
20:45

Ajax (Netherlands)	2–2	(Czech Republic) Slavia Prague
Vertonghen 4'; Suárez 90+1' (pen.)	Report	Černý 13'; van der Wiel 41' (o.g.)

Amsterdam Arena, Amsterdam
Attendance: 30,116
Referee: Sten Kaldma (Estonia)

=== Group G ===
Pos	Team	Pld	W	D	L	GF	GA	GD	Pts	Qualification	STE	VAL	FCK	BRU	ROS
1	(France) Saint-Étienne	4	2	2	0	9	4	+5	8	Advance to knockout stage	—	2–2	—	—	3–0
2	(Spain) Valencia	4	1	3	0	8	4	+4	6	Advance to knockout stage	—	—	1–1	1–1	—
3	(Denmark) Copenhagen	4	1	2	1	4	5	−1	5	Advance to knockout stage	1–3	—	—	—	1–1
4	(Belgium) Club Brugge	4	0	3	1	2	3	−1	3		1–1	—	0–1	—	—
5	(Norway) Rosenborg	4	0	2	2	1	8	−7	2		—	0–4	—	0–0	—

Source: RSSSF
23 October 2008
20:45

Copenhagen (Denmark)	1–3	(France) Saint-Étienne
Santin 59' (pen.)	Report	Gomis 2'; Perrin 37'; Payet 65'

Parken Stadium, Copenhagen
Attendance: 17,187
Referee: Craig Thomson (Scotland)
23 October 2008
20:45

Rosenborg (Norway)	0–0	(Belgium) Club Brugge
	Report

Lerkendal stadion, Trondheim
Attendance: 12,166
Referee: Vladimír Hriňák (Slovakia)

6 November 2008
20:45

Saint-Étienne (France)	3–0	(Norway) Rosenborg
Ilan 59'; Machado 63'; Mirallas 76'	Report

Stade Geoffroy-Guichard, Saint-Étienne
Attendance: 24,006
Referee: Robert Małek (Poland)
6 November 2008
21:30

Valencia (Spain)	1–1	(Denmark) Copenhagen
Morientes 61'	Report	Santin 85'

Mestalla Stadium, Valencia
Attendance: 20,000
Referee: Knut Kircher (Germany)

27 November 2008
20:45

Club Brugge (Belgium)	1–1	(France) Saint-Étienne
Vargas 50'	Report	Gigliotti 44'

Jan Breydel Stadium, Bruges
Attendance: 21,381
Referee: Felix Brych (Germany)
27 November 2008
20:45

Rosenborg (Norway)	0–4	(Spain) Valencia
	Report	Mata 21'; Hernández 76'; Baraja 88'; Joaquín 90'

Lerkendal stadion, Trondheim
Attendance: 14,549
Referee: Kevin Blom (Netherlands)

4 December 2008
20:45

Valencia (Spain)	1–1	(Belgium) Club Brugge
Žigić 60'	Report	Alcaraz 18'

Mestalla Stadium, Valencia
Attendance: 18,000
Referee: Martin Atkinson (England)
4 December 2008
20:45

Copenhagen (Denmark)	1–1	(Norway) Rosenborg
Antonsson 85'	Report	Iversen 33'

Parken Stadium, Copenhagen
Attendance: 18,184
Referee: Thomas Einwaller (Austria)

17 December 2008
20:45

Club Brugge (Belgium)	0–1	(Denmark) Copenhagen
	Report	Santin 58'

Jan Breydel Stadium, Bruges
Attendance: 22,169
Referee: Darko Ceferin (Slovenia)
17 December 2008
20:45

Saint-Étienne (France)	2–2	(Spain) Valencia
Ilan 29', 44'	Report	Morientes 32'; Žigić 72'

Stade Geoffroy-Guichard, Saint-Étienne
Attendance: 28,000
Referee: Alexandru Deaconu (Romania)

=== Group H ===
Pos	Team	Pld	W	D	L	GF	GA	GD	Pts	Qualification	CSK	DEP	LPO	NAN	FEY
1	(Russia) CSKA Moscow	4	4	0	0	12	5	+7	12	Advance to knockout stage	—	3–0	2–1	—	—
2	(Spain) Deportivo La Coruña	4	2	1	1	5	4	+1	7	Advance to knockout stage	—	—	—	1–0	3–0
3	(Poland) Lech Poznań	4	1	2	1	5	5	0	5	Advance to knockout stage	—	1–1	—	2–2	—
4	(France) Nancy	4	1	1	2	8	7	+1	4		3–4	—	—	—	3–0
5	(Netherlands) Feyenoord	4	0	0	4	1	10	−9	0		1–3	—	0–1	—	—

Source: RSSSF
23 October 2008
18:00 (20:00 UTC+4)

CSKA Moscow (Russia)	3–0	(Spain) Deportivo La Coruña
Dzagoev 9', 12'; Vágner Love 61'	Report

Luzhniki Stadium, Moscow
Attendance: 13,060
Referee: Alon Yefet (Israel)
23 October 2008
20:45

Nancy (France)	3–0	(Netherlands) Feyenoord
Zerka 47'; Féret 53'; Hélder Maurílio 84'	Report

Stade Marcel Picot, Tomblaine
Attendance: 11,512
Referee: Matteo Trefoloni (Italy)

6 November 2008
18:15

Lech Poznań (Poland)	2–2	(France) Nancy
Peszko 5'; Štilić 22'	Report	Malonga 10'; Zerka 81'

Stadion Miejski, Poznań
Attendance: 21,601
Referee: Cristian Balaj (Romania)
6 November 2008
19:30

Feyenoord (Netherlands)	1–3	(Russia) CSKA Moscow
Van Bronckhorst 29'	Report	Van Bronckhorst 14' (o.g.); Vágner Love 40', 81'

Feijenoord Stadion, Rotterdam
Attendance: 25,000
Referee: Svein Oddvar Moen (Norway)

27 November 2008
18:00 (20:00 UTC+3)

CSKA Moscow (Russia)	2–1	(Poland) Lech Poznań
Dzagoev 31'; Zhirkov 45+1'	Report	Štilić 66'

Luzhniki Stadium, Moscow
Attendance: 10,800
Referee: Duarte Gomes (Portugal)
27 November 2008
21:00

Deportivo La Coruña (Spain)	3–0	(Netherlands) Feyenoord
Lopo 30'; Hofland 50' (o.g.); Guardado 51'	Report

Riazor, A Coruña
Attendance: 20,000
Referee: Martin Ingvarsson (Sweden)

4 December 2008
20:45

Lech Poznań (Poland)	1–1	(Spain) Deportivo La Coruña
Rengifo 42'	Report	Colotto 2'

Stadion Miejski, Poznań
Attendance: 21,000
Referee: Craig Thomson (Scotland)
4 December 2008
20:45

Nancy (France)	3–4	(Russia) CSKA Moscow
Zerka 5'; Féret 72'; Camerling 79'	Report	Vágner Love 23', 62', 88'; Ramón 33'

Stade Marcel Picot, Tomblaine
Attendance: 14,074
Referee: Zsolt Szabó (Hungary)

17 December 2008
20:45

Deportivo La Coruña (Spain)	1–0	(France) Nancy
Bodipo 74'	Report

Riazor, A Coruña
Attendance: 15,000
Referee: Michael Weiner (Germany)
17 December 2008
20:45

Feyenoord (Netherlands)	0–1	(Poland) Lech Poznań
	Report	Đurđević 26'

Feijenoord Stadion, Rotterdam
Attendance: 23,000
Referee: Paolo Dondarini (Italy)
