= Fabio Quagliarella =

Italian footballer (born 1983)

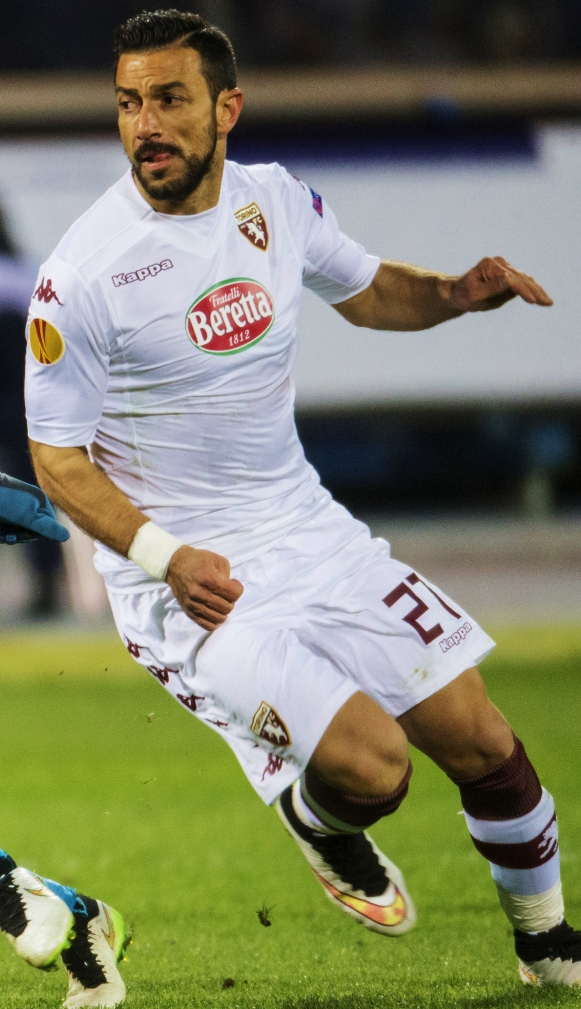
- Quagliarella playing for Torino in 2015

Personal information
- Full name: Fabio Quagliarella
- Date of birth: 31 January 1983 (age 43)
- Place of birth: Castellammare di Stabia, Italy
- Height: 1.80 m (5 ft 11 in)
- Position: Forward

Youth career
- 1988–1991: Annunziatella
- 1991–1993: Pro Juventude
- 1993–1997: Gragnano
- 1997–1999: Torino

Senior career*
Years	Team	Apps	(Gls)
1999–2005	Torino	39	(7)
2002–2003	→ Fiorentina (loan)	12	(1)
2003–2004	→ Chieti (loan)	43	(19)
2005–2006	Ascoli	33	(3)
2006–2007	Sampdoria	35	(13)
2007–2009	Udinese	73	(25)
2009–2010	Napoli	34	(11)
2010–2014	Juventus	84	(23)
2014–2016	Torino	50	(18)
2016–2023	Sampdoria	242	(89)
Total		645	(209)

International career
2000–2001	Italy U18	8	(1)
2001	Italy U19	9	(1)
2002–2004	Italy U20	8	(2)
2004	Italy U21	2	(1)
2007–2019	Italy	28	(9)
- * Club domestic league appearances and goals

Fabio Quagliarella (Italian pronunciation: [ˈfaːbjo kwaʎʎaˈrɛlla]; born 31 January 1983) is an Italian former professional footballer who played as a forward.

Throughout his career, Quagliarella played for eight different Italian clubs, winning three consecutive Serie A titles from the 2011–12 to 2013–14 seasons with Juventus. With the Turin-based club, he also won two Supercoppa Italiana titles in 2012 and 2013, as well as winning the 2002–03 Serie C2 with Fiorentina. In the Italian top flight, Quagliarella also represented Torino, Ascoli, Udinese, Napoli and Sampdoria.

At the international level, Quagliarella represented Italy from under-18 to under-21 youth levels before his debut for the senior team in 2007. He was part of Italy's squads for UEFA Euro 2008, the 2009 FIFA Confederations Cup and the 2010 FIFA World Cup.

Individually, Quagliarella was awarded the Serie A Goal of the Year in 2009, achieved during his time at Udinese; in 2017 and 2018 respectively, he obtained the Premio Gentleman Fairplay and the Scirea Career Award while playing for Sampdoria, which pertain to both personality and playing ability. During the 2018–19 season while at Sampdoria, he scored in eleven consecutive league games, a feat only previously accomplished by Gabriel Batistuta; Quagliarella finished the campaign with 26 goals in Serie A, which saw him capture the Capocannoniere title as the league's top scorer, also being named the league's best forward.

== Club career ==
=== Early career ===
Quagliarella grew up in the youth ranks of Gragnano, then Torino, where he made his debut in Serie A on 14 May 2000, in a 2–1 victory over Piacenza.

In 2002, given his limited playing opportunities, Quagliarella was sent on loan to Fiorentina, at that time in Serie C2. In Florence, he scored just one goal in 12 games. In January, head coach Alberto Cavasin decided to cease the loan, whereupon Torino then sent him on loan to Chieti in Serie C1. He also remained in Abruzzo the following season and scored 17 goals in 32 games during the 2003–04 Serie C1 season. His time in Chieti ended with a total of 19 goals in 43 games; at the end of the season, he returned to Torino, in given the 2004–05 season in Serie B.

At Torino, Quagliarella was an occasional starter, and with seven goals in 34 games, contributed to the club's promotion to Serie A. However, as a result of the bankruptcy of Torino Calcio, in August 2005, he was released on a free transfer and accepted a contract with Ascoli. With Ascoli, he was ensured a starting spot in the lineup during the 2005–06 season, scoring his first goal in Serie A on 21 December 2005, a 1–0 home win over Treviso.

=== Udinese, Ascoli and Sampdoria ===
Quagliarella signed with Udinese in the summer of 2005. However, Udinese immediately sold half of his registration rights to newly promoted Ascoli as part of a co-ownership deal. He stayed at Ascoli for just one season, scoring just three times in 33 appearances, and his rights were bought back in full by Udinese in June 2006 for an undisclosed fee.

On 7 July 2006, he was sold in co-ownership to Sampdoria, in exchange for the transfer of Salvatore Foti. During the 2006–07 season with the Blucerchiati, Quagliarella scored 13 goals in league play and earned attention worldwide due to the spectacular nature of many of his goals. His breakout season at Sampdoria led to a call-up to the Italy national team and numerous rumors of a high-profile transfer abroad.

Following his breakout 2006–07 season, both Udinese and Sampdoria were unable to come to terms on his co-ownership deal and went to a blind auction on 21 June 2007. In the auction, Sampdoria bid €6.5 Million but was outbid by Udinese, who paid €7.15 million. At Udinese, he started the 2007–08 season slowly, scoring just once in the season's first 11 games. However, he soon found his footing at the club, forming a dangerous strike partnership with Antonio Di Natale and scoring a total of 12 goals in the 2007–08 season. This led to Quagliarella securing a place in the Italian squad for the UEFA Euro 2008 competition. Fabio continued his goal-scoring at Udinese in the 2008–09 season, reaching 21 goals in all competitions, including eight goals in the UEFA Cup, where Udinese reached the quarter-finals.

=== Napoli ===
On 1 June 2009, Quagliarella moved to his hometown club Napoli for a transfer fee of €18 Million, where he signed a five-year deal. At Napoli, he was partnered with Ezequiel Lavezzi and attacking midfielder Marek Hamšík and scored 11 goals in Serie A to help Napoli qualify for the 2010–11 UEFA Europa League with a sixth-place finish in the league. He played his last match for Napoli in the Europa League, in a 1–0 win over IF Elfsborg. He was an unused bench in the second leg, which Walter Mazzarri used new signing Edinson Cavani partnered with Lavezzi, who the former scored a brace to help the team qualify.

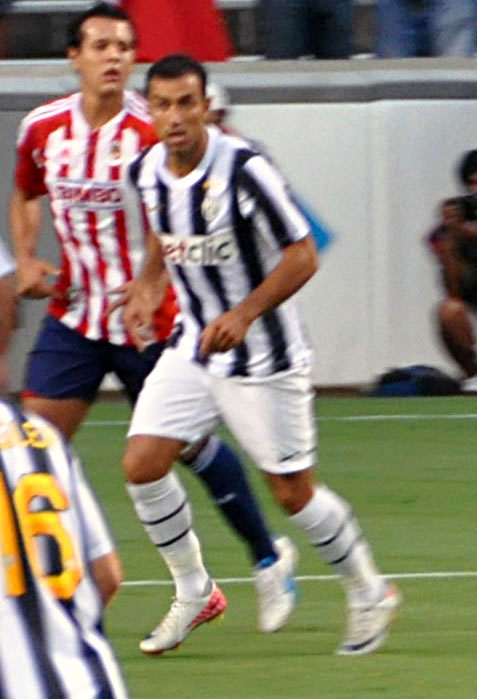
Quagliarella playing for Juventus in 2011

=== Juventus ===
On 27 August 2010, Quagliarella signed for Juventus on loan for a fee of €4.5 million, with the Bianconeri having the option to sign him permanently for €10.5 million. Before the winter break, he was the team's top scorer with nine league goals in 17 appearances. However, he injured his right anterior cruciate ligament on 6 January 2011, in the first match after the winter break, losing to Parma 4–1. He would miss the rest of the season. On 22 June 2011, his contract was redeemed by Juventus for €10.5 million. Quagliarella signed a three-year contract extension to stay with Juventus until 2014. On 1 April 2012, he scored his third goal of the season against former club Napoli and refused to celebrate due to his Neapolitan roots. On 30 April 2012, Quagliarella signed a 12-month extension that would keep him tied to the club until the summer of 2015. On 22 September 2012, Quagliarella scored his first brace of the 2012–13 season against Chievo. On 10 November 2012, Quagliarella scored his first hat-trick of the season against Pescara in a match Juventus won 6–1. In the Champions League, he scored his first goal in the competition in the club's opening 2–2 away draw against defending champions Chelsea.

Quagliarella opened the scoring in the March 2013 Derby d'Italia game against Inter Milan with a curled shot from 25 yards (23 m), and made the pass for Alessandro Matri's winner.

=== Return to Torino ===
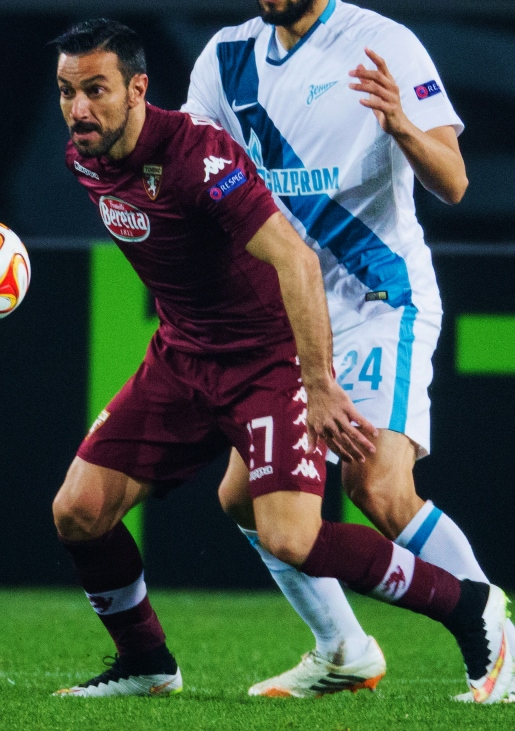
Quagliarella playing for Torino in 2015

On 17 July 2014, Torino purchased Quagliarella outright for €3.5 million, payable over three years. This signalled his return to Torino after nine years, signing a three-year contract. Upon his return, Quagliarella scored the 3–0 goal on 7 August 2014 from a penalty kick in the third round of the 2014–15 Europa League against Brommapojkarna.

In his first Serie A match back at the club, he won a penalty after being fouled by Inter's Nemanja Vidić, but Marcelo Larrondo missed it and the game finished goalless. The following round, Quagliarella scored his first goal in Serie A for Torino against Cagliari on 24 September 2014 to secure a 2–1 win. He then scored his first goal in Europe with Torino on 2 October 2014 against Copenhagen, with a penalty in the 93rd minute to secure a 1–0 win for the Granata. On 1 February 2015, he scored his first hat-trick for Torino in Serie A against Sampdoria, ending 5–1. On 26 April 2015, he scored the decisive goal against Juventus, 2–1, which handed a victory to Torino in the Turin derby after exactly 20 years.

=== Return to Sampdoria ===
After a series of controversies with Torino's fans, resulting from Quagliarella's failure to celebrate after a goal scored against his former club Napoli, on 1 February 2016 he was loaned to Sampdoria with an obligation to buy. He scored his first goal upon his return on 20 February against Inter Milan in the 92nd minute, in a 3–1 away loss. On 20 November, Quagliarella scored his 100th Serie A goal in the 84th minute of his 343rd league appearance, and subsequently set up a goal for teammate Luis Muriel, as Sampdoria came from behind to defeat Sassuolo 3–2 at home.

On 13 January 2017, he signed a new contract with Sampdoria that would keep him with the club until June 2019. On 21 January 2018, Quagliarella scored a hat-trick in a 3–1 home win over Fiorentina but was later substituted in the 75th minute after picking up a knock; his hat-trick saw him set a new personal career seasonal best in Serie A, with 15 goals. He finished the 2017–18 Serie A campaign with 19 goals in 35 appearances, among the best scorers in the league.

During the 2018–19 Serie A season, on 2 September 2018, Quagliarella scored the final goal of a 3–0 home win against Napoli, with what was described by the BBC as a "sensational" backheel volley. He later cited the goal as the best of his career. During the same match, he had previously also set up Gregoire Defrel's second goal. The aforementioned goal was later nominated for the 2019 FIFA Puskás Award on 19 August 2019.

On 26 January 2019, Quagliarella scored two goals from penalties – his 13th and 14th league goals in the past 11 games – in a 4–0 home win over his former club Udinese, also setting up Manolo Gabbiadini's final goal; as a result, he equalled Gabriel Batistuta's record of scoring in 11 consecutive Serie A matches in a single season, which the Argentine had set in 1994, with Fiorentina, during the 1994–95 season. With his 143rd Serie A goal, Quagliarella also overtook Christian Vieri in 28th place in the Serie A all-time goalscoring charts. By the end of the season, Quagliarella scored 26 Serie A goals for Sampdoria, achieving the Capocannoniere title. Quagliarella was named the Serie A Best Forward and the Serie A Team of the Year. Quagliarella was also ranked 94th in The Guardian's list of "The 100 best footballers in the world" in 2019.

On 22 May 2021, the final match of the 2020–21 Serie A season, Quagliarella made his 500th appearance in Serie A against Parma, scoring the opening goal in an eventual 3–0 home win. On 19 February 2022, he reached his 100th goal with Sampdoria, by netting a brace in a 2–0 victory over Empoli. With his 180th Serie A goal, Quagliarella also overtook Giampiero Boniperti in 13th place in the Serie A all-time goalscoring charts.

On 5 March 2023, Quagliarella made his 550th appearance in Serie A against Salernitana, thus becoming the fifth outfield player to achieve this feat, following Pietro Vierchowod, Javier Zanetti, Francesco Totti and Paolo Maldini. On 20 May, he scored a goal in a 5–1 defeat against Milan, and in doing so at the age of 40 years and 109 days, he became the fourth oldest player to score a goal in Serie A, only behind Zlatan Ibrahimović, Alessandro Costacurta, and Silvio Piola, as well as the fifth 40-year-old player to score a Serie A goal. He also became the seventh player in Serie A to score in his 18th consecutive season and 19th straight calendar year, following José Altafini, Gianni Rivera, Silvio Piola, Roberto Mancini, Roberto Baggio and Francesco Totti. However, Sampdoria were relegated from Serie A following the 2022–23 season after finishing bottom of the table, and on 7 July, Quagliarella was released after seven years with the club.

After spending a few months as a free agent, on 19 November 2023, Quagliarella publicly announced his retirement from playing football.

== International career ==
Quagliarella played for the Italian youth sides, known as the Azzurrini, from the 2000–01 season up until the 2004–05 season. He made his debut for the Italy U17 team (equivalent to the current Italy U18 side) on 5 September 2000 against Slovakia. The following season, he was a member of the Italy U19 team during their 2002 UEFA European Under-19 Championship qualifying campaign.

Following his impressive performances with Sampdoria in the 2006–07 season, Quagliarella was called up to the Italian senior squad, known as the Azzurri, for a friendly against Romania in February 2007. However, his senior international debut was delayed, as the match was cancelled as a result of fan riots in Serie A that weekend.

Quagliarella finally made his senior debut for Italy on 28 March 2007, in a Euro 2008 qualifier against Scotland in Bari, coming on as a substitute for Luca Toni in the final minutes of the 2–0 win. In Kaunas on 6 June 2007, he made his first start for Italy in a vital Euro 2008 qualifier against Lithuania, also scoring his first two goals for the national side in the eventual 2–0 win. On 6 February 2008, he scored his third goal for Italy, and his nation's third goal of the match, in their 3–1 triumph over Portugal in an international friendly in Zurich. This was also the 1200th goal scored by the Italy national side. Quagliarella was subsequently included in the Italian UEFA Euro 2008 squad by manager Roberto Donadoni; he made his only appearance of the tournament in Italy's second group match, a 1–1 draw against Romania, coming on as a second-half substitute for Alessandro Del Piero. Italy then bowed out of the tournament on penalties to eventual champions Spain in the quarter-finals.

Quagliarella was subsequently called up to Italy's 23-man squad for the 2009 FIFA Confederations Cup in South Africa under returning manager Marcello Lippi; his only appearance throughout the tournament came in Italy's second group match, a 1–0 defeat to Egypt. Italy were disappointingly eliminated from the tournament in the group stage following a 3–0 defeat to eventual champions Brazil in their final group match.

Quagliarella was also included in the final 23-man Italian 2010 FIFA World Cup squad by coach Marcello Lippi; on 5 June 2010, he scored a header in a 1–1 away draw against Switzerland in Italy's final friendly before the tournament. In Italy's final match of Group F at the 2010 World Cup against Slovakia, Quagliarella came on at the beginning of the second half for Gennaro Gattuso, with Italy trailing 1–0, and in the space of 45 minutes, he contributed to teammate Antonio Di Natale's goal, who scored from a rebound, and subsequently executed a beautiful 25-yard chip in injury time to bring the score to 3–2; furthermore, throughout the match, he also had a volley cleared off the line by Slovak defender Martin Škrtel, and had an equalising goal controversially ruled offside, although he was ultimately unable to prevent the Italians from losing 3–2, resulting in one of Italy's most shocking World Cup eliminations. The match was his 21st cap for Italy, while his goal was his seventh overall. Although the Italian team was widely criticised in the media, Quagliarella was praised for his performance.

Under Italy's new manager Cesare Prandelli, Quagliarella scored Italy's fourth goal in a 5–0 home win in a Euro 2012 qualifying match against the Faroe Islands on 7 September 2010. He later also appeared in a friendly against Romania held in Klagenfurt on 17 November, scoring the equalising goal in the 1–1 draw; although some sources cite Italy's goal as an own goal, the Italian Football Federation recognises the goal as Quagliarella's.

On 2 September 2014, Quagliarella was recalled to the national team for a friendly match against the Netherlands and UEFA Euro 2016 qualifying matches against Azerbaijan and Norway under new Italy manager Antonio Conte, although he did not appear during the matches.

On 3 October 2015, Quagliarella earned another call-up, once again for Italy's Euro 2016 qualifying matches against Azerbaijan and Norway; once again, he did not appear during the matches.

On 15 March 2019, he received a call-up from Roberto Mancini for UEFA Euro 2020 qualifying matches against Finland and Liechtenstein. On 23 March 2019, Quagliarella came off the bench in the 80th minute for Italy, in a 2–0 home win over Finland; this was 3,048 days since his last appearance, which had come in November 2010. On 26 March, Quagliarella was handed his first international start since 5 June 2010, and his first competitive start since 14 October 2009 (a 3–2 home victory over Cyprus in a 2010 World Cup qualifier, which was also held at the Stadio Ennio Tardini in Parma), scoring twice from the penalty spot in a 6–0 home win over Liechtenstein to become Italy's all-time oldest goalscorer, at the age of 36 years and 54 days; he also set-up Moise Kean's goal during the match.

== Style of play ==
Quagliarella was recognised for his long-range shooting, as well as scoring with headers and volleys. Though usually a striker, he was occasionally deployed as a forward, winger, second striker, and an attacking midfielder. He also took penalty kicks during his career.

Quagliarella had his running speed clocked at 35.07 km/h at the age of 38, making him one of the fastest players in the Serie A.

== Personal life ==
Quagliarella wore the number 27 in honour of Niccolò Galli, a childhood friend and youth academy teammate of his who used to wear this number; Galli died in a road accident in 2001, at the age of 17. He also wore the number 18 while with Juventus.

In February 2017, Quagliarella revealed in an interview with Mediaset that during his time at Napoli, he and his family were threatened by a stalker over five years, which eventually led to his departure from the club.

== Career statistics ==
=== Club ===
Appearances and goals by club, season and competition
Club	Season	League			Cup (Note: Includes Coppa Italia, Coppa Italia Serie C and Supercoppa Italiana)		Europe (Note: Includes UEFA Cup, UEFA Champions League and UEFA Europa League)		Total	
Club	Season	Division	Apps	Goals	Apps	Goals	Apps	Goals	Apps	Goals
Torino	1999–2000	Serie A	1	0	0	0	–		1	0
Torino	2000–01	Serie B	0	0	0	0	–		0	0
Torino	2001–02	Serie A	4	0	0	0	–		4	0
Torino	Total		5	0	0	0	–		5	0
Fiorentina (loan)	2002–03	Serie C2	12	1	3	0	–		15	1
Chieti (loan)	2002–03	Serie C1	11	2	0	0	–		11	2
Chieti (loan)	2003–04	Serie C2	32	17	4	0	–		36	17
Chieti (loan)	Total		43	19	4	0	–		47	19
Torino	2004–05 (Note: Includes two matches and one goal in Serie A play-off)	Serie B	36	8	4	2	–		40	10
Ascoli	2005–06	Serie A	33	3	0	0	–		33	3
Sampdoria	2006–07	Serie A	35	13	7	1	–		42	14
Udinese	2007–08	Serie A	37	12	2	0	–		39	12
Udinese	2008–09	Serie A	36	13	1	0	11	8	48	21
Udinese	Total		73	25	3	0	11	8	87	33
Napoli	2009–10	Serie A	34	11	2	0	–		36	11
Napoli	2010–11	Serie A	0	0	0	0	1	0	1	0
Napoli	Total		34	11	2	0	1	0	37	11
Juventus	2010–11	Serie A	17	9	0	0	0	0	17	9
Juventus	2011–12	Serie A	23	4	4	0	–		27	4
Juventus	2012–13	Serie A	27	9	1	0	7	4	35	13
Juventus	2013–14	Serie A	17	1	2	1	4	2	23	4
Juventus	Total		84	23	7	1	11	6	102	30
Torino	2014–15	Serie A	34	13	0	0	12	4	46	17
Torino	2015–16	Serie A	16	5	2	0	–		18	5
Torino	Total		50	18	2	0	12	4	64	22
Sampdoria	2015–16	Serie A	16	3	0	0	–		16	3
Sampdoria	2016–17	Serie A	37	12	1	0	–		38	12
Sampdoria	2017–18	Serie A	35	19	1	0	–		36	19
Sampdoria	2018–19	Serie A	37	26	2	0	–		39	26
Sampdoria	2019–20	Serie A	28	11	1	1	–		29	12
Sampdoria	2020–21	Serie A	33	13	0	0	–		33	13
Sampdoria	2021–22	Serie A	33	4	2	2	–		35	6
Sampdoria	2022–23	Serie A	23	1	2	0	–		25	1
Sampdoria	Total		242	89	9	3	–		251	92
Career total			647	210	41	7	35	18	723	235

=== International ===
Appearances and goals by national team and year
National team	Year	Apps	Goals
Italy	2007	7	2
Italy	2008	3	1
Italy	2009	7	0
Italy	2010	8	3
Italy	2019	3	2
Total		28	8

Scores and results list Italy's goal tally first, score column indicates score after each Quagliarella goal.

List of international goals scored by Fabio Quagliarella
No.	Date	Venue	Opponent	Score	Result	Competition
1	6 June 2007	Darius and Girėnas Stadium, Kaunas, Lithuania	Lithuania	1–0	2–0	UEFA Euro 2008 qualification
2	6 June 2007	Darius and Girėnas Stadium, Kaunas, Lithuania	Lithuania	2–0	2–0	UEFA Euro 2008 qualification
3	6 February 2008	Letzigrund, Zürich, Switzerland	Portugal	3–1	3–1	Friendly
4	5 June 2010	Stade de Genève, Geneva, Switzerland	Switzerland	1–1	1–1	Friendly
5	24 June 2010	Ellis Park Stadium, Johannesburg, South Africa	Slovakia	2–3	2–3	2010 FIFA World Cup
6	7 September 2010	Stadio Artemio Franchi, Florence, Italy	Faroe Islands	4–0	5–0	UEFA Euro 2012 qualification
7	26 March 2019	Stadio Ennio Tardini, Parma, Italy	Liechtenstein	3–0	6–0	UEFA Euro 2020 qualification
8	26 March 2019	Stadio Ennio Tardini, Parma, Italy	Liechtenstein	4–0	6–0	UEFA Euro 2020 qualification

== Honours ==
Torino

- Serie B: 2000–01

Fiorentina

- Serie C2: 2001–02

Juventus

- Serie A: 2011–12, 2012–13, 2013–14
- Supercoppa Italiana: 2012, 2013
- Coppa Italia runner-up: 2011–12

Individual

- Serie A Goal of the Year: 2009, 2019
- Premio Gentleman Fairplay: 2017
- Premio Nazionale Carriera Esemplare "Gaetano Scirea": 2018
- Serie A Best Forward: 2018–19
- Serie A top scorer: 2018–19 (26 goals)
- Serie A Team of the Year: 2018–19
