= 2000–01 Torino Calcio season =

Torino Calcio
2000–01 season
- Chairman: Attilio Romero
- Head coach: Luigi Simoni; Giancarlo Camolese
- Stadium: Stadio delle Alpi
- Serie B: 1st
- Coppa Italia: Round of 16
- Top goalscorer: League: Marco Ferrante; Stefan Schwoch (8); All: Stefan Schwoch (16)
- Highest home attendance: 27,715 vs Cosenza
- Lowest home attendance: 3,801 vs Cesena
- Average home league attendance: 16,982
Home colours	Away colours	Third colours

The 2000–01 season was the 90th season in existence of Torino Calcio and the club's first season back in the second division of Italian football. In addition to the domestic league, Torino participated in this season's edition of the Coppa Italia. The season covered the period from 1 July 2000 to 30 June 2001.

In 2000-2001, Torino had Kelme as technical sponsor, while the main sponsor was Directa.

== Pre-season and friendlies ==
Win Draw Loss Fixtures

25 July 2000 Friendly	Selezione Cogne (Italy)	0–32	(Italy) Torino	Cogne
17:00 CEST (UTC+2)				Stadium: Comunale di Epinel; Referee: Sconosciuto

26 July 2000 Friendly	Selezione Gran Paradiso (Italy)	0–17	(Italy) Torino	Cogne
17:00 CEST (UTC+2)				Stadium: Comunale di Epinel; Attendance: 600; Referee: Trinelli

29 July 2000 Friendly	Ivrea (Italy)	2–5	(Italy) Torino	Cogne
17:00 CEST (UTC+2)				Stadium: Comunale di Epinel; Attendance: 800; Referee: Gallione

30 July 2000 Friendly	Charvensod Sant'Orso (Italy)	0–16	(Italy) Torino	Cogne
17:00 CEST (UTC+2)				Stadium: Comunale di Epinel; Attendance: 1,000; Referee: Trombizzi

2 August 2000 Friendly	Pro Vercelli (Italy)	1–4	(Italy) Torino	Vercelli
17:30 CEST (UTC+2)				Stadium: Stadio Silvio Piola; Attendance: 4,000; Referee: Alberto

10 August 2000 Friendly	Alessandria (Italy)	0–4	(Italy) Torino	Alessandria
20:30 CEST (UTC+2)				Stadium: Stadio Giuseppe Moccagatta; Attendance: 2,500; Referee: De Marco

== Competitions ==
=== Overview ===
Competition	First match	Last match	Starting round	Final position	Record							
Competition	First match	Last match	Starting round	Final position	Pld	W	D	L	GF	GA	GD	Win %
Serie B	1 September 2000	10 June 2001	Matchday 1	Winners	38	22	7	9	48	33	+15	57.89
Coppa Italia	13 August 2000	23 September 2000	Group stage	Round of 16	7	4	2	1	12	8	+4	57.14
Total					45	26	9	10	60	41	+19	57.78

Source: Soccerway

=== Serie B ===
==== League table ====
Pos	Team	Pld	W	D	L	GF	GA	GD	Pts	Promotion or relegation
1	Torino (P, C)	38	22	7	9	48	33	+15	73	Promotion to Serie A
2	Piacenza (P)	38	20	10	8	51	34	+17	70	Promotion to Serie A
3	Chievo (P)	38	19	13	6	54	34	+20	70	Promotion to Serie A
4	Venezia (P)	38	19	12	7	62	43	+19	69	Promotion to Serie A
5	Empoli	38	18	10	10	52	43	+9	64	

Source: Almanacco Illustrato del Calcio - La Storia 1898-2004, Panini Edizioni, Modena, September 2005
Rules for classification: 1) points; 2) head-to-head points; 3) head-to-head goal difference; 4) head-to-head goals scored; 5) goal difference; 6) number of goals scored.
(C) Champions; (P) Promoted

==== Results summary ====
Overall								Home						Away					
Pld	W	D	L	GF	GA	GD	Pts	W	D	L	GF	GA	GD	W	D	L	GF	GA	GD
38	22	7	9	48	33	+15	73	12	5	2	23	11	+12	10	2	7	25	22	+3

Source: Serie B

==== Results by round ====
Round	1	2	3	4	5	6	7	8	9	10	11	12	13	14	15	16	17	18	19	20	21	22	23	24	25	26	27	28	29	30	31	32	33	34	35	36	37	38
Ground	H	A	H	A	H	A	H	A	A	H	A	H	A	H	A	H	H	A	H	A	H	A	H	A	H	A	H	H	A	H	A	H	A	H	A	A	H	A
Result	L	D	L	D	W	W	D	L	L	D	L	W	L	W	W	W	W	W	W	W	W	L	W	L	W	W	W	D	W	D	W	D	W	W	L	W	W	W
Position	16	17	18	18	15	13	14	16	16	16	17	15	16	15	14	11	11	10	7	5	3	6	4	7	4	2	2	3	3	4	2	4	3	3	3	2	1	1

Source: Serie B
A = Away; H = Home; W = Win; D = Draw; L = Loss

==== Matches ====
1 September 2000 1	Torino	0–2	Ancona	Turin
				Stadium: Stadio delle Alpi

10 September 2000 2	Pistoiese	1–1	Torino	Pistoia

20 September 2000 3	Torino	0–1	Venezia	Turin
				Stadium: Stadio delle Alpi

27 September 2000 4	Treviso	1–1	Torino	Treviso

2 October 2000 5	Torino	1–0	Sampdoria	Turin
				Stadium: Stadio delle Alpi

8 October 2000 6	Monza	2–3	Torino	Monza

22 October 2000 7	Torino	1–1	Ternana	Turin
				Stadium: Stadio delle Alpi

29 October 2000 8	Piacenza	3–1	Torino	Piacenza

1 November 2000 9	Cittadella	2–1	Torino	Cittadella

5 November 2000 10	Torino	1–1	Siena	Turin
				Stadium: Stadio delle Alpi

12 November 2000 11	Chievo	4–2	Torino	Verona

19 November 2000 12	Torino	1–0	Crotone	Turin
				Stadium: Stadio delle Alpi

23 November 2000 13	Genoa	2–1	Torino	Genoa

3 December 2000 14	Torino	2–1	Ravenna	Turin
				Stadium: Stadio delle Alpi

8 December 2000 15	Cagliari	0–1	Torino	Cagliari

17 December 2000 16	Torino	1–0	Empoli	Turin
				Stadium: Stadio delle Alpi

23 December 2000 17	Torino	1–0	Pescara	Turin
				Stadium: Stadio delle Alpi

14 January 2001 18	Cosenza	0–2	Torino	Cosenza

19 January 2001 19	Torino	2–0	Salernitana	Turin
				Stadium: Stadio delle Alpi

28 January 2001 20	Ancona	1–2	Torino	Ancona

4 February 2001 21	Torino	2–0	Pistoiese	Turin
				Stadium: Stadio delle Alpi

12 February 2001 22	Venezia	1–0	Torino	Venice

18 February 2001 23	Torino	1–0	Treviso	Turin
				Stadium: Stadio delle Alpi

25 February 2001 24	Sampdoria	2–0	Torino	Genoa

4 March 2001 25	Torino	2–1	Monza	Turin
				Stadium: Stadio delle Alpi

12 March 2001 26	Ternana	0–1	Torino	Terni

18 March 2001 27	Torino	1–0	Piacenza	Turin
				Stadium: Stadio delle Alpi

25 March 2001 28	Torino	2–2	Cittadella	Turin
				Stadium: Stadio delle Alpi

1 April 2001 29	Siena	0–2	Torino	Siena

6 April 2001 30	Torino	0–0	Chievo	Turin
				Stadium: Stadio delle Alpi

14 April 2001 31	Crotone	0–1	Torino	Crotone

22 April 2001 32	Torino	1–1	Genoa	Turin
				Stadium: Stadio delle Alpi

29 April 2001 33	Ravenna	1–2	Torino	Ravenna

10 May 2001 34	Torino	2–0	Cagliari	Turin
				Stadium: Stadio delle Alpi

20 May 2001 35	Empoli	2–1	Torino	Empoli

27 May 2001 36	Pescara	0–1	Torino	Pescara

3 June 2001 37	Torino	2–1	Cosenza	Turin
				Stadium: Stadio delle Alpi

10 June 2001 38	Salernitana	0–2	Torino	Salerno

=== Coppa Italia ===
==== Group stage ====
13 August 2000 1	Varese	0–3	Torino	Pavia
20:45				Stadium: Stadio Pietro Fortunati

17 August 2000 2	Torino	2–1	Cesena	Alessandria
20:30				Stadium: Stadio Giuseppe Moccagatta

20 August 2000 3	Torino	3–3	Ternana	Turin
20:45				Stadium: Stadio delle Alpi

==== Round of 32 ====
27 August 2000 First leg	Torino	2–1	Bari	Turin
18:00				Stadium: Stadio delle Alpi

6 September 2000 Second leg	Bari	0–0 (1–2 agg.)	Torino	Bari
20:45				Stadium: Stadio San Nicola

==== Round of 16 ====
16 September 2000 First leg	Torino	1–3	Milan	Turin
20:45				Stadium: Stadio delle Alpi

23 September 2000 Second leg	Milan	0–1 (3–2 agg.)	Torino	Milan
18:00				Stadium: San Siro
