= Manuel Arboleda =

Colombian footballer (born 1979)

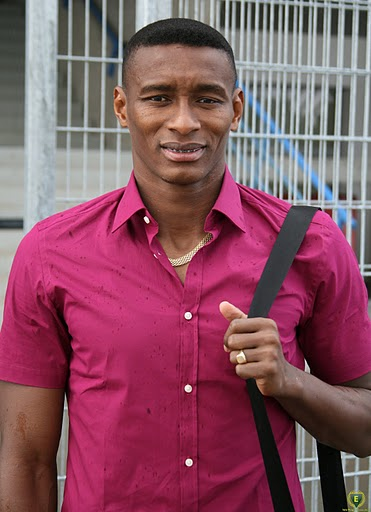
- Arboleda in 2010

Personal information
- Full name: Manuel Santos Arboleda Sánchez
- Date of birth: August 2, 1979 (age 47)
- Place of birth: Buenventura, Colombia
- Height: 1.88 m (6 ft 2 in)
- Position: Centre-back

Youth career
- Independiente Santa Fe

Senior career*
Years	Team	Apps	(Gls)
2001–2002	Independiente Santa Fe	30	(3)
2002	Deportes Tolima		
2003	Centauros Villavicencio		
2004	Deportes Tolima		
2004	Atlético Huila		
2005–2006	Cienciano del Cuzco		
2006–2008	Zagłębie Lubin	53	(9)
2008–2014	Lech Poznań	101	(6)
2013	Lech Poznań II	1	(0)
- * Club domestic league appearances and goals

Manuel Santos Arboleda Sánchez (born 2 August 1979) is a Colombian former professional footballer who played as a centre-back.

== Honours ==
Cienciano

- Recopa Sudamericana: 2004

Zagłębie Lubin

- Ekstraklasa: 2006–07
- Polish Super Cup: 2007

Lech Poznań

- Ekstraklasa: 2009–10
- Polish Cup: 2008–09
- Polish Super Cup: 2009

Individual

- Piłka Nożna Foreigner of the Year: 2010
