= Gaetano D'Agostino =

Italian footballer and coach

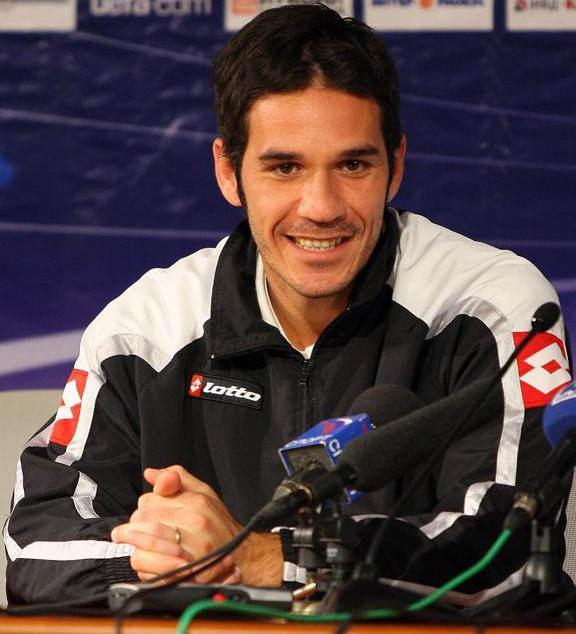
- D'Agostino with Udinese in 2008

Personal information
- Full name: Gaetano D'Agostino
- Date of birth: 3 June 1982 (age 44)
- Place of birth: Palermo, Italy
- Height: 1.82 m (6 ft 0 in)
- Position: Midfielder

Youth career
- 1990–1998: Palermo
- 1998–2000: Roma

Senior career*
Years	Team	Apps	(Gls)
2000–2001	Roma	1	(0)
2001–2003	Bari	63	(2)
2003–2005	Roma	22	(1)
2005–2006	Messina	42	(5)
2006–2010	Udinese	114	(12)
2010–2011	Fiorentina	20	(5)
2011–2014	Siena	40	(7)
2013	→ Pescara (loan)	7	(2)
2014	Fidelis Andria	9	(0)
2014–2015	Benevento	17	(1)
2015–2016	Lupa Roma	19	(1)
Total		354	(36)

International career
1998	Italy U16	7	(0)
1997–1999	Italy U17	15	(6)
1999–2001	Italy U19	10	(3)
2002–2004	Italy U21	17	(4)
2009	Italy	5	(0)

Managerial career
- 2016–2017: Anzio
- 2017–2018: Virtus Francavilla
- 2018–2019: Alessandria
- 2019–2021: Lecco
- 2021–2022: Vibonese
Medal record
Men's football
Representing Italy
UEFA European Under-21 Championship
Winner	2004 Germany
- * Club domestic league appearances and goals

Gaetano D'Agostino (Italian pronunciation: [ɡaeˈtaːno daɡoˈstiːno]; born 3 June 1982) is an Italian former professional footballer and current coach. Usually a playmaker, D'Agostino is best known for his incisive passing.

== Club career ==
=== Early career ===
D'Agostino was brought up in the Palermo youth system, in Roma youth system only for two seasons because he was progressing enormously and, in 2001, went to Bari with co-ownership rights as part of the deal that brought Antonio Cassano to Roma. He was tagged for 5 billion Italian lire for 50% of the rights. He then came back to Roma for €1,291,142 and signed a new three-year contract in June 2003 in but did not figure much.

=== Messina ===
In January 2005, he was loaned to Messina on loan with an option to sign in co-ownership deal for €750,000. In half a season at Messina, he made 42 appearances and scored 4 goals, being instrumental for the club's impressive performances in the Serie A league, including a seventh place in 2004–05, the best top flight placement in Messina history.

In June 2006 Messina bought the remaining rights for €60,000.

=== Udinese ===
On 7 July 2006, he was bought by Udinese for a reported €1.2 million, where he firmly established himself as a regular, also achieving a place in the Italy national team during his stay with the Friuli-based side. He made sensational performances during the 2008–2009 Serie A season.

=== Fiorentina ===
On 3 June 2010, he was sold to Fiorentina for a reported fee between €9 and 10 million. La Viola later announced they signed him in a co-ownership deal, for €5.75 million. He made his debut on 29 August 2010, scoring Fiorentina's only goal in a 1–1 draw at home against Napoli.

After the injury of Riccardo Montolivo, D'Agostino partnered with Marco Donadel as the central midfielders.

=== Joining Siena via Udinese ===
In the middle of 2011, D'Agostino returned to Udinese after they won his 50% rights in a blind auction, Udinese winning with a bid of €110,000 to €50,000. D'Agostino said that “It still hurts a little that Fiorentina didn’t keep me,” and expressed his desire to remain in Florence, having earlier said he loved living in the city. On 7 July, Siena agreed a deal to sign the playmaker.

He left Siena at the end of the 2013–14 season, after the club declared bankruptcy.

== International career ==
D'Agostino was a member of the Italy U21 squad, making 17 appearances and scoring 4 goals.

He received his first senior call-up in November 2008, but did not play, making his debut on 6 June 2009 in a friendly match against Northern Ireland.

== Coaching career ==
After retirement, he took over a head coaching role at Serie D amateurs Anzio in 2016.

In June 2017 he was named new head coach of Lega Pro club Virtus Francavilla. On 12 June 2018, he was appointed as coach of Alessandria, signing a two-year contract. He left the club on 17 February 2019.

On 4 October 2019, he was hired as head coach of Serie C club Lecco.

On 27 June 2021, he joined Vibonese. He was sacked on 14 February 2022, with Vibonese in last place in the league table.
