= Simone Pepe =

Italian footballer (born 1983)

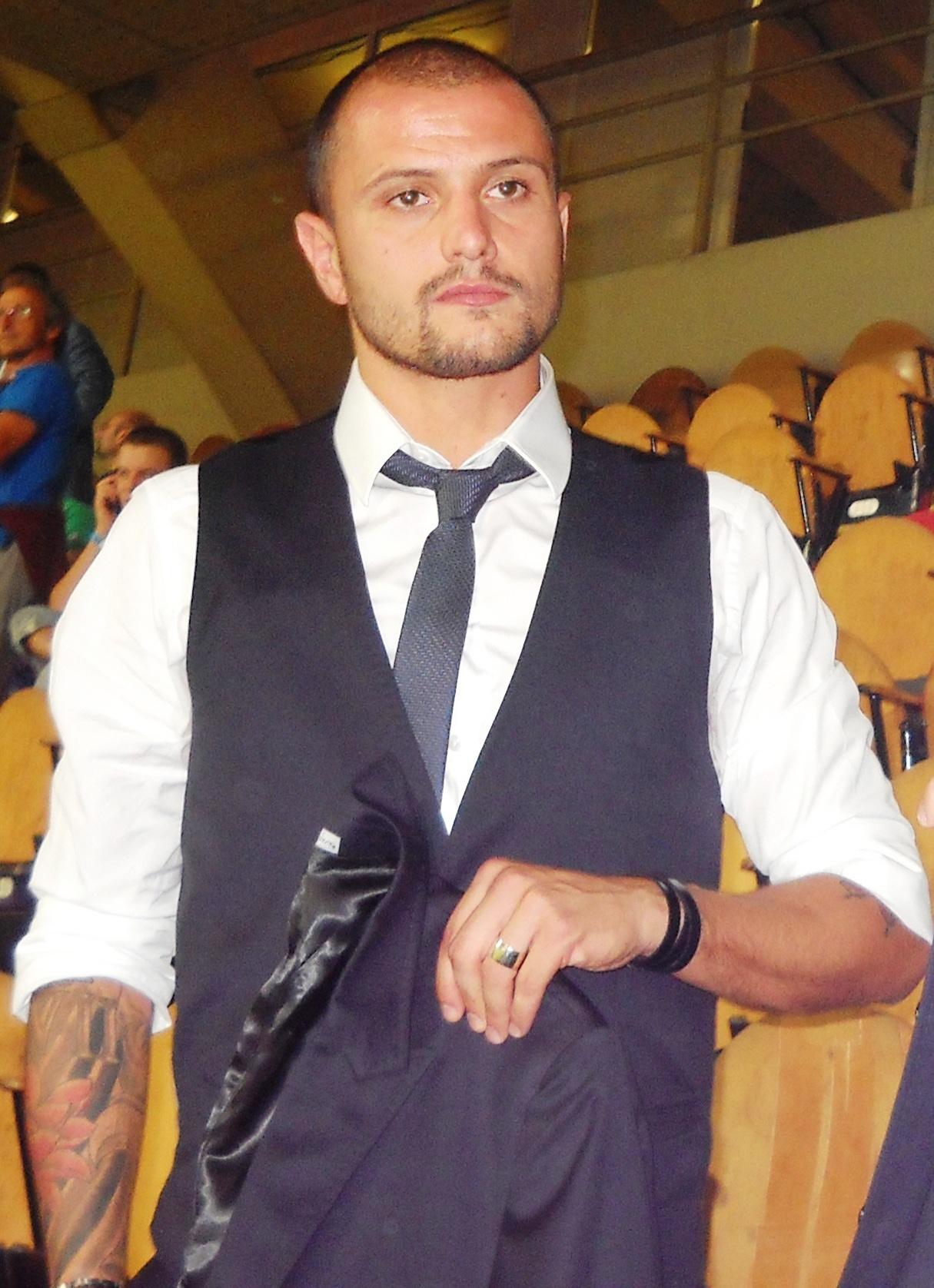
- Pepe in 2010

Personal information
- Full name: Simone Pepe
- Date of birth: 30 August 1983 (age 43)
- Place of birth: Albano Laziale, Italy
- Height: 1.78 m (5 ft 10 in)
- Position: Winger

Youth career
- Roma

Senior career*
Years	Team	Apps	(Gls)
2001–2003	Roma	0	(0)
2002	→ Lecco (loan)	5	(0)
2002–2003	→ Teramo (loan)	31	(11)
2003–2006	Palermo	22	(1)
2004–2005	→ Piacenza (loan)	30	(12)
2006	Udinese	6	(0)
2006–2007	Cagliari	36	(3)
2007–2010	Udinese	98	(14)
2010–2015	Juventus	76	(12)
2015–2016	Chievo	22	(3)
2016–2017	Pescara	12	(0)
Total		338	(56)

International career
2001	Italy U17	1	(1)
2001	Italy U19	9	(6)
2002–2003	Italy U20	13	(6)
2004–2006	Italy U21	12	(2)
2008–2011	Italy	23	(0)
- * Club domestic league appearances and goals

Simone Pepe (Italian pronunciation: [siˈmoːne ˈpeːpe]; born 30 August 1983) is an Italian former footballer who played as a winger, on either side of the pitch.

After starting out at Roma, he went on to compete in Serie A for 12 seasons, spending most of his time at Udinese and Juventus and amassing totals of 251 games and 31 goals, winning four consecutive national championships with the latter club. He also had his later career hindered by several injuries.

Pepe appeared for Italy at the 2009 Confederations Cup and the 2010 World Cup, earning 23 caps in total between 2008 and 2011.

== Club career ==
=== Early years and Palermo ===
Pepe was born in Albano Laziale, a comune not far from Rome. He started his career at A.S. Roma but never represented the team officially, being loaned to amateurs Calcio Lecco 1912 and Teramo Calcio for the duration of his contract.

In summer 2003, Serie B side U.S. Città di Palermo signed Pepe in a co-ownership deal, for a nominal fee of just €500, and he scored one goal in 19 appearances to help his team gain promotion to Serie A for the first time ever, as champions.

Pepe was loaned to Piacenza Calcio also in the second level in July 2004, in order to gain experience. On 31 August, Roma sold the rest of his registration rights to Palermo for another nominal fee. It was reported that Roma chairman Franco Sensi owed his Palermo counterpart Maurizio Zamparini money, and both Pepe and Cesare Bovo were sold to the latter at an un-economic price to settle the debt, but the former denied this, stating the transfers were totally transparent.

In June 2005, Pepe returned to Palermo as the Sicilians' striker Luca Toni left for ACF Fiorentina. In the following winter transfer window, however, he was on the move again.

=== Udinese and Cagliari ===
Pepe joined Udinese Calcio midway through the 2005–06 campaign in a co-ownership deal, for €500,000, along with Salvatore Masiello and Nicola Santoni (as part of the David Di Michele deal for €5.35M). As they were again intent on signing youngsters he featured sparingly, moving to Cagliari Calcio in a temporary deal in July 2006 as the former club had just recalled Gyan Asamoah who shined at that year's FIFA World Cup; the latter also purchased 50% of his registration rights from Palermo for €1.5million.

Pepe netted his first goal in the top flight on 18 November 2006 in his 23rd appearance in the competition, grabbing the game's only goal at home against former side Palermo in the last-minute, and he helped the Sardinians finally narrowly avoid relegation.

=== Return to Udinese ===
On 22 June 2007, Udinese acquired Cagliari's 50% of the player's rights by winning the blind bidding between the two clubs, and in October, Andrea Dossena, Roman Eremenko, Pepe and Cristián Zapata were awarded a new contract until June 2012; after Asamoah suffered an injury, eventually leaving the team, Pepe became an undisputed first-choice.

=== Juventus ===
On 9 June 2010, Juventus FC announced they had signed Pepe on loan for €2.6 million, with the option to sign him permanently for €7.5 million on 1 July. He scored five times in 30 matches in his first season in Turin.

In 2011–12, Pepe formed an efficient right-wing partnership with newly signed Stephan Lichtsteiner, contributing with four of his six league goals and two assists after the first ten fixtures. On 11 September 2011, in Juventus's opening match of the season at the club's new stadium, he scored the second goal in an eventual 4–1 home win over Parma. On 29 November, he netted a vital equaliser against S.S.C. Napoli (3–3, at the San Paolo Stadium) to keep his team's unbeaten run going. the Bianconeri eventually won the national championship, after a nine-year drought.

In spite of some inconsistent displays, Pepe endeared himself to the Juventus faithful for his work rate and pace, earning the nickname of "Speedy Pepe" while also being compared with former club great Angelo Di Livio, who also played as a winger. Starting in December 2012, however, he spent nearly two years on the sidelines, due to several physical problems.

Pepe was operated on 27 February 2013, and after a few matches with the youth squad he returned to the pitch on 18 December, coming on as an 81st-minute substitute of a 3–0 win over U.S. Avellino 1912 in the Coppa Italia. He was injured again in mid-February 2014, and was finally called up again for Juventus's League match with Bologna F.C. 1909 on 19 April, making his third appearance of the season in a 3–0 success against Cagliari that confirmed the Old Lady's third consecutive national championship conquest.

After recovering fully, Pepe returned to the starting line-up on 15 January 2015, in a 6–1 victory over Hellas Verona F.C. in the round-of-16 of the domestic cup. He scored his first goal in three years on 23 May, as he netted a 90th-minute penalty in a 3–1 home win over Napoli.

=== Chievo ===
On 11 August 2015, Pepe signed with A.C. ChievoVerona on a free transfer. He appeared in 23 games across all competitions, being released at the end of the season.

=== Pescara ===
On 22 August 2016, Pepe joined Delfino Pescara 1936 on a one-year deal. After only a few appearances for the last-placed team, he decided to announce his retirement at the age of 33 and his decision to become their manager.

== International career ==
In spite of a first poor year in the Serie A, Pepe was selected by the Italian under-21 team to the 2006 UEFA European Championship, but he did not play in any games in Portugal in an eventual group stage exit. He made his debut with the senior side on 11 October 2008, under manager Marcello Lippi, in a 0–0 away draw against Bulgaria for the 2010 FIFA World Cup qualifiers.

Pepe was part of the squads at the 2009 FIFA Confederations Cup and the 2010 World Cup, both in South Africa. He totalled five appearances in the tournaments, starting in all three matches in the latter, as the Azzurri were sent home after the first stage on both occasions.

== Style of play ==
Initially a forward at the beginning of his career, Pepe was a versatile player who, appeared in several offensive and midfield positions: he was frequently deployed as a wide midfielder, as an attacking winger, or as a wingback, usually on the right flank, although he was capable of playing on either side of the pitch; he was also fielded as an attacking midfielder, or even as a supporting striker on occasion. A fast, strong, energetic and hardworking player, his main attributes were his stamina, his defensive contribution and his crossing ability. He also possessed good technique and link-up play, and was effective from set pieces. However, he was also injury-prone.

== Match-fixing allegations ==
During the 2011–12 Italian football scandal investigations, Pepe was one of many players to be accused of match-fixing. He was accused of failing to report the alleged fix of a 3–3 draw against F.C. Bari 1908 in May 2010 during his time with Udinese, and faced a potential one-year ban if found guilty; he denied any wrongdoing, however, and he was later acquitted of all charges in August 2012.

== Career statistics ==
=== Club ===
Appearances and goals by club, season and competition
Club	Season	League			Coppa Italia		Continental		Other		Total	
Club	Season	Division	Apps	Goals	Apps	Goals	Apps	Goals	Apps	Goals	Apps	Goals
Roma	2001–02	Serie A	0	0	0	0	0	0	—		0	0
Lecco (loan)	2001–02	Serie C1	5	0	0	0	—		—		5	0
Teramo (loan)	2002–03	Serie C1	31	11	0	0	—		2 (Note: Appearances in play-offs)	0	33	11
Palermo	2003–04	Serie B	19	1	5	2	—		—		24	3
Palermo	2005–06	Serie A	3	0	0	0	3 (Note: Appearances in UEFA Cup)	0	—		6	0
Palermo	Total		22	1	5	2	3	0	0	0	30	3
Piacenza (loan)	2004–05	Serie B	30	12	2	1	—		—		32	13
Udinese	2005–06	Serie A	6	0	3	0	—		—		9	0
Cagliari	2006–07	Serie A	36	3	3	0	—		—		39	3
Udinese	2007–08	Serie A	33	3	5	2	—		—		38	5
Udinese	2008–09	Serie A	33	4	1	0	11 (Note: Appearances in UEFA Europa League)	2	—		45	6
Udinese	2009–10	Serie A	32	7	5	0	—		—		37	7
Udinese	Total		98	14	11	2	11	2	0	0	120	18
Juventus	2010–11	Serie A	30	5	2	1	10	0	—		37	6
Juventus	2011–12	Serie A	31	6	2	0	—		—		33	6
Juventus	2012–13	Serie A	1	0	0	0	0	0	—		1	0
Juventus	2013–14	Serie A	2	0	1	0	0	0	—		3	0
Juventus	2014–15	Serie A	12	1	3	0	1 (Note: Appearances in UEFA Champions League)	0	0	0	16	1
Juventus	Total		76	12	8	1	11	0	0	0	90	13
Chievo	2015–16	Serie A	22	3	1	0	—		—		23	3
Pescara	2016–17	Serie A	12	0	0	0	—		—		12	0
Career total			340	56	32	6	25	2	2	0	395	64

== Honours ==
Palermo

- Serie B: 2003–04

Juventus

- Serie A: 2011–12, 2012–13, 2013–14, 2014–15
- Supercoppa Italiana: 2012, 2013
- Coppa Italia: 2014–15; Runner-up 2011–12
- UEFA Champions League: Runner-up 2014–15
