= Christian Obodo =

Nigerian footballer (born 1984)

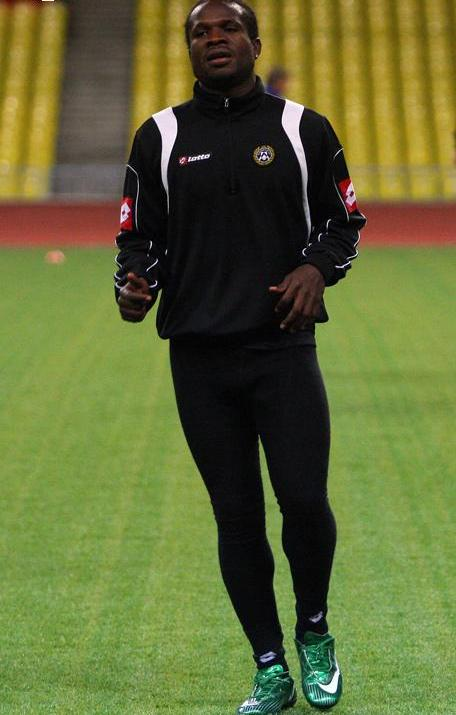

Personal information
- Full name: Christian Udubuesi Obodo
- Date of birth: 11 May 1984 (age 42)
- Place of birth: Warri, Nigeria
- Height: 1.78 m (5 ft 10 in)
- Position: Defensive midfielder

Youth career
- Plateau United

Senior career*
Years	Team	Apps	(Gls)
2001–2004	Perugia	62	(1)
2004–2005	Fiorentina	33	(2)
2005–2012	Udinese	78	(6)
2010–2011	→ Torino (loan)	16	(1)
2011–2012	→ Lecce (loan)	23	(0)
2013	Dinamo Minsk	1	(0)
2014	Olhanense	13	(0)
2014–2016	Skoda Xanthi	28	(2)
2016	Concordia Chiajna	17	(4)
2016	Pandurii Târgu Jiu	9	(1)
2017	Apollon Smyrnis	17	(0)
Total		297	(17)

International career
2004–2008	Nigeria	21	(4)
- * Club domestic league appearances and goals as of 15 June 2017

Christian Udubuesi Obodo (born 11 May 1984 in Warri, Nigeria) is a Nigerian former footballer who played as a defensive midfielder.

== Club career ==
After playing in the Nigerian league for Plateau United , Obodo signed forPerugia in Italian Serie A. He scored his first league goal in a 2–2 draw against Inter Milan at the end of the 2003 season.

Fiorentina signed him as a key part of their renovation as the team came back to Serie A in 2004. They only bought half the registration rights and in 2005 La Viola and Perugia were forced to make a blind auction to decide his future. Perugia won the auction but immediately sold him to Udinese.

Obodo played his first UEFA Champions League with Le zebrette in 2005–06 season, partnered in midfield with Sulley Muntari, up until Muntari's exit for Portsmouth F.C. in 2007.

On 28 January 2014, the Portuguese side S.C. Olhanense announced they had agreed to a deal with Obodo after playing in a training game against Lokomotiv Moscow.

== International career ==
In 2001, Obodo played for the Flying Eagles coached by Stephen Keshi at the African Youth Championship in Ethiopia. Though the team crashed out of the tournament with just one point from 3 games, Obodo showed a lot of promise in a team that had other players such as Bartholomew Ogbeche and Justice Christopher.

He made his long-awaited debut for the Super Eagles in the LG Cup tournament in 2003 featuring in the games versus Ghana and Cameroon. He also made a substitute appearance in the prestigious Brazil friendly, playing as a striker. He has also appeared in Nigeria's 4–1 win over Malawi in an ANC 2004 qualifier. Obodo scored his first goal in a 5–2 win at Algeria.

He made six appearances out of 10 in the 2006 World Cup qualification series, scoring a goal. At the 2006 African Cup of Nations, he featured in 4 of Nigeria's six games, scoring in the 2–0 win over Zimbabwe. Obodo last played for the Super Eagles in 2008.

== Abduction ==
On the morning of 9 June 2012, Obodo was reportedly kidnapped by gunmen near Warri, Delta State. He was rescued the next day in nearby Isoko by men of the Nigerian police force, no ransom was paid, and suspects were arrested.

== Career statistics ==
=== Club ===
Club performance			League		Cup		Continental		Total	
Season	Club	League	Apps	Goals	Apps	Goals	Apps	Goals	Apps	Goals
Italy			League		Coppa Italia		Europe		Total	
2001–02	Perugia	Serie A	1	0	0	0	-		1	0
2002–03	Perugia	Serie A	30	1	5	0	0	0	35	1
2003–04	Perugia	Serie A	31	0	5	1	10	0	46	1
2004–05	Fiorentina	Serie A	33	2	6	0	-		39	2
2005–06	Udinese	Serie A	28	1	1	1	12	0	41	2
2006–07	Udinese	Serie A	30	5	3	1	-		33	6
2007–08	Udinese	Serie A	1	0	3	0	-		4	0
2008–09	Udinese	Serie A	18	0	0	0	8	1	26	1
2009–10	Udinese	Serie A	1	0	0	0	0	0	1	0
2010–11	Torino	Serie B	16	1	1	1	-		17	2
2011–12	Lecce	Serie A	20	0	1	0	-		21	0
Country	Italy		189	11	24	3	30	1	243	15
Total			189	11	24	3	30	1	243	15

=== International ===
Nigeria national team
Year	Apps	Goals
2003	3	0
2004	5	0
2005	3	1
2006	5	2
2007	2	0
2008	3	1
Total	21	4

=== International goals ===
#	Date	Venue	Opponent	Score	Result	Competition
	4 September 2005	Oran, Algeria	Algeria	5–2	Won	2006 FIFA World Cup qualification
	27 January 2006	Port Said, Egypt	Zimbabwe	2–0	Won	2006 Africa Cup of Nations
	2 September 2006	Abuja, Nigeria	Niger	2–0	Won	2008 Africa Cup of Nations qualification
	11 October 2008	Abuja, Nigeria	Sierra Leone	4–1	Won	2010 FIFA World Cup qualification

== Honours ==
Perugia

- UEFA Intertoto Cup: 2003
