= List of Italian football transfers winter 2014–15 =

This is a list of Italian football transfers featuring at least one Serie A or Serie B club which were completed from 5 January to 2 February 2015, the date which the winter transfer window closed. A free agent could join any club at any time.

== Transfers ==
Legend

- Italic text indicates that the player had already left the team on loan this season, or was a new signing who immediately left the club.

Date	Name	Moving from	Moving to	Fee
3 October 2014	Roberto Maurantonio	Unattached	Carpi	Free
6 October 2014	Hugo Almeida	Unattached	Cesena	Free
7 October 2014	Denis Tonucci	Unattached	Modena	Free
16 October 2014	Gordan Bunoza	Unattached	Pescara	Free
26 October 2014	Pavel Vidanov	Unattached	Trapani	Free
3 November 2014	Emanuele Concetti	Unattached	Crotone	Free
4 December 2014	Salvatore Aronica	Palermo	Unattached	Released
9 December 2014	Roger Miller Rojas	Unattached	Varese	Free
16 December 2014	Joaquín Correa	Estudiantes (Argentina)	Sampdoria	$10M
18 December 2014	Mbaye Diagne	Juventus	Westerlo (Belgium)	Loan
19 December 2014	Davide Zappacosta	Avellino	Atalanta	Co-ownership resolution
22 December 2014	Alan Arario	Roma	Vélez (Argentina)	Undisclosed
22 December 2014	Sebastian Eriksson	Cagliari	Göteborg (Sweden)	Loan
27 December 2014	Fernando Torres	Chelsea (England)	Milan	Undisclosed (Note: The player already played for his new club in 2014–15 season, the deal turned from temporary to definitive.)
27 December 2014	Andi Lila	PAS Giannina (Greece)	Parma	Loan
29 December 2014	Fernando Torres	Milan	Atlético Madrid (Spain)	18-month loan
29 December 2014	Juan Surraco	Livorno	Unattached	Released
3 January 2015	Faisal Bangal	Atalanta	San Marino	Loan
3 January 2015	Erik Friberg	Bologna	Esbjerg (Denmark)	Free
4 January 2015	Amato Ciciretti	Roma	Messina	Loan
5 January 2015	Manolo Gabbiadini	Sampdoria (& Juventus, c)	Napoli	Undisclosed
5 January 2015	Ivan Strinić	Dnipro (Ukraine)	Napoli	Free
5 January 2015	Tino Costa	Spartak Moscow (Russia)	Genoa	Loan
5 January 2015	Leandro Greco	Genoa	Verona	Loan
5 January 2015	Alessio Cerci	Atlético Madrid (Spain)	Milan	18-month loan
5 January 2015	N'Diaye Djiby	Chievo	Benevento	Loan
5 January 2015	Soma Novothny	Napoli	Südtirol	Loan
5 January 2015	Lukas Podolski	Arsenal (England)	Inter	Loan
7 January 2015	Gianluca Sansone	Sampdoria	Bologna	Loan
7 January 2015	Edimar Fraga	Chievo	Córdoba (Spain)	Loan
7 January 2015	Simone Petricciuolo	Avellino	Aversa Normanna	Loan
7 January 2015	Guido D'Attilio	Avellino	Aversa Normanna	Undisclosed
7 January 2015	Duilio Evangelista	Avellino	Aversa Normanna	Undisclosed
7 January 2015	Tomasz Kupisz	Chievo	Cittadella	Loan
7 January 2015	Valerio Nava	Atalanta	S.P.A.L.	Loan
7 January 2015	Francesco Anacoura	Juventus	Pontedera	Loan
7 January 2015	Kevin Méndez	Roma	Perugia	18-month loan
7 January 2015	Francesco Stanco	Modena	Cittadella	Loan
8 January 2015	Emanuele Geria	Trapani	Civitanovese	Loan
8 January 2015	Alejandro González	Verona	Cagliari	Loan
8 January 2015	Nicola Belmonte	Udinese	Catania	Undisclosed
8 January 2015	Matteo Messetti	Chievo	Reggiana	18-month loan
8 January 2015	Cephas Malele	Palermo	Trapani	Loan
8 January 2015	Mauricio Pinilla	Genoa	Atalanta	Loan
8 January 2015	Francesco Fedato	Sampdoria	Modena	Loan
8 January 2015	Luca Garritano	Cesena	Modena	Loan
8 January 2015	Andrea Rossini	Parma	Savona	Loan
8 January 2015	Masahudu Alhassan	Udinese	Latina	Loan
8 January 2015	Devis Nossa	Virtus Entella	Lumezzane	Undisclosed
9 January 2015	Fabio Formato	Frosinone	Ischia	Loan
9 January 2015	Luca Giannone	Bologna	Reggiana	Loan return
9 January 2015	Alex Cordaz	Parma	Crotone	Loan
9 January 2015	Pavol Bajza	Crotone	Parma	Loan return
9 January 2015	Željko Brkić	Udinese	Cagliari	Loan
9 January 2015	Andrea Pastore	Trapani	Forlì	Loan
9 January 2015	Sergio Viotti	Chievo	Pro Vercelli	Loan
9 January 2015	Xherdan Shaqiri	Bayern Munich (Germany)	Inter	Undisclosed
9 January 2015	Luca Ricciardi	Latina	Pisa	Loan
9 January 2015	Marcello Trotta	Fulham (England)	Avellino	Undisclosed
9 January 2015	Simone Tascone	Frattese	Ternana	Loan
10 January 2015	Alessandro Diamanti	Guangzhou Evergrande (China)	Fiorentina	Loan
10 January 2015	Giacomo Corduas	Trapani	Monza	Loan
10 January 2015	Giacomo Lucarini	Genoa	Monza	Loan
10 January 2015	Alessandro Berardi	Lazio	Messina	Loan
10 January 2015	Josef Hušbauer	Sparta Prague (Czech Republic)	Cagliari	Loan
11 January 2015	Andrea Arrighini	Avellino	Pisa	Loan
11 January 2015	Duje Čop	Dinamo Zagreb (Croatia)	Cagliari	Loan
12 January 2015	Thomas Manfredini	Sassuolo	Vicenza	Loan
12 January 2015	Stefan Ristovski	Parma	Latina	Loan
12 January 2015	Irakli Shekiladze	Empoli	Latina	Undisclosed
12 January 2015	Riccardo Nardini	Modena	Ascoli	Loan
12 January 2015	Pape Dia	Udinese	San Marino	Loan
12 January 2015	Zoran Kvržić	HNK Rijeka (Croatia)	Spezia	Loan
13 January 2015	Maxi López	Chievo	Torino	Undisclosed
13 January 2015	Nicola Sambo	Chievo	Spezia	Undisclosed
13 January 2015	Manuel Coppola	Cesena	Catania	Undisclosed
13 January 2015	Matteo Gerbaudo	Juventus	S.P.A.L.	Loan
13 January 2015	Benjamin Mokulu	Mechelen (Belgium)	Avellino	Undisclosed
13 January 2015	Andrea Petagna	Milan	Vicenza	Loan
13 January 2015	Alen Stevanović	Torino	Spezia	Loan
13 January 2015	Marco Djurić	Cesena	L'Aquila	Loan
13 January 2015	Emanuele Allegra	Napoli	Südtirol	Loan
13 January 2015	Pasquale Schiattarella	Spezia	Bari	Loan
13 January 2015	Osarimen Ebagua	Spezia	Bari	Loan
13 January 2015	Nikola Jakimovski	Jagodina (Serbia)	Varese	Undisclosed
14 January 2015	Manuel Pamić	Sparta Prague (Czech Republic)	Frosinone	Undisclosed
14 January 2015	Riccardo Maniero	Pescara	Catania	Undisclosed
14 January 2015	Kelvin Matute	Pro Vercelli	Crotone	Loan
14 January 2015	Caio Secco	Crotone	San Marino	Loan
14 January 2015	Davide Moro	Empoli	Salernitana	Undisclosed
14 January 2015	Mattia Sprocati	Parma	Pro Vercelli	Loan
14 January 2015	Marcello Cottafava	Latina	S.P.A.L.	Undisclosed
14 January 2015	Abou Diop	Torino	Matera	Loan
15 January 2015	Riccardo Pasi	Bologna	Cremonese	Undisclosed
15 January 2015	Demiro Pozzebon	Avellino	L'Aquila	Loan
15 January 2015	Marcelinho	Catania	Unattached	Released
15 January 2015	Anders Christiansen	Nordsjælland (Denmark)	Chievo	Undisclosed
15 January 2015	Federico Masi	Bari	Lupa Roma	Undisclosed
15 January 2015	Alberto Almici	Atalanta	Avellino	Loan
15 January 2015	Kingsley Boateng	Milan	Bari	Undisclosed
15 January 2015	Marko Dugandžić	Osijek (Croatia)	Ternana	Loan
15 January 2015	Lorenzo Longo	Bari	Paganese	Loan
15 January 2015	Antonio Nocerino	Milan	Parma	Loan
16 January 2015	Antonio Rosati	Napoli	Fiorentina	Undisclosed
16 January 2015	Tsouka Dozi	Nantes (France)	Crotone	Undisclosed
16 January 2015	Rafał Wolski	Fiorentina	Mechelen (Belgium)	Loan
16 January 2015	Riccardo Saponara	Milan	Empoli	Loan
16 January 2015	Matteo Brunelli	Prato	Carpi	Free
16 January 2015	Alexis Rolín	Catania	Boca Juniors (Argentina)	18-month loan
16 January 2015	Gabriel Appelt Pires	Juventus	Livorno	Loan
17 January 2015	Suso	Liverpool (England)	Milan	Undisclosed
16 January 2015	Rodrigo Aguirre	Empoli	Udinese	Undisclosed
19 January 2015	Adrian Stoian	Chievo	Crotone	Loan
19 January 2015	Raffaele Schiavi	Frosinone	Catania	Loan
19 January 2015	Ionuț Rada	Cluj (Romania)	Bari	Undisclosed
19 January 2015	Ryder Matos	Fiorentina	Palmeiras (Brazil)	Loan
19 January 2015	Hugo Almeida	Cesena	Unattached	Released
20 January 2015	da Costa	Sampdoria	Bologna	Undisclosed
20 January 2015	Matija Katanec	Zrinjski Mostar (Bosnia and Herzegovina)	Spezia	Undisclosed
20 January 2015	Tin Jedvaj	Roma	Bayer Leverkusen (Germany)	€7M
20 January 2015	Alessio Vita	Monza	Sassuolo	Free
20 January 2015	Aladje	Sassuolo	Real Vicenza	Loan
20 January 2015	Alessio Vita	Sassuolo	Vicenza	Loan
20 January 2015	Silvestre Varela	Porto (Portugal)	Parma	Loan
20 January 2015	Antonini Čulina	Spezia	Varese	Loan
20 January 2015	Agostino Camigliano	Udinese	Cittadella	Loan
20 January 2015	Daniele Sciaudone	Bari	Catania	Loan
20 January 2015	Fabio Concas	Carpi	Unattached	Released
20 January 2015	Andrea Rossi	Parma	Pescara	Undisclosed
20 January 2015	Alberto Frison	Catania	Sampdoria	Loan
20 January 2015	Cristian Rodríguez	Atlético Madrid (Spain)	Parma	Loan
20 January 2015	Achille Coser	Livorno	Virtus Entella	Undisclosed
21 January 2015	Dejan Stojanović	Bologna	Crotone	Loan
21 January 2015	Federico Rodríguez	Bologna	Lugano (Switzerland)	Free
21 January 2015	Rubén Pérez	Torino	Atlético Madrid (Spain)	Loan return
21 January 2015	Filippo Lombardi	Bologna	Santarcangelo	Loan
21 January 2015	Paolo Sammarco	Spezia	Frosinone	Undisclosed
21 January 2015	Antonio Mazzotta	Cesena	Catania	Loan
21 January 2015	Fernandinho	Grêmio (Brazil)	Verona	Loan
21 January 2015	Mbaye Niang	Milan	Genoa	Loan
21 January 2015	Elia Bastianoni	Varese	Livorno	Loan
21 January 2015	Luca Ceccarelli	Spezia	Catania	Loan
21 January 2015	Nnamdi Oduamadi	Milan	Latina	Loan
21 January 2015	Maurício	Sporting Clube de Portugal	Lazio	Loan
21 January 2015	Hrvoje Miličević	Pescara	Teramo	Loan
21 January 2015	Marko Marin	Fiorentina	Chelsea (England)	Loan return
22 January 2015	Andrea Coda	Udinese	Sampdoria	Loan
22 January 2015	Luis Muriel	Udinese	Sampdoria	Loan
22 January 2015	Antonio Palma	Atalanta	FeralpiSalò	Loan
22 January 2015	Antonio Rozzi	Lazio	Virtus Entella	Loan
22 January 2015	Alessandro Ligi	Bari	Virtus Entella	Loan
22 January 2015	Leandro Rinaudo	Virtus Entella	Bari	Loan
22 January 2015	Gino Peruzzi	Catania	Boca Juniors	Undisclosed
22 January 2015	Elio De Silvestro	Juventus	Virtus Lanciano	€1.2M (player swap)
22 January 2015	Laurențiu Brănescu	Virtus Lanciano	Juventus	Co-ownership resolution, €1.2M (player swap)
22 January 2015	Romano Perticone	Novara	Trapani	Loan
23 January 2015	Alessio Ruci	Perugia	Cremonese	Undisclosed
23 January 2015	Pasquale De Vita	Verona (at Lanciano, t)	Monza	Loan
23 January 2015	Andrea Giannarelli	Juventus	Barletta	Loan
23 January 2015	Abdallah Yaisien	Bologna	Arezzo	Loan
23 January 2015	Marcelo Larrondo	Torino	Tigre (Argentina)	Loan
23 January 2015	Ibrahima Mbaye	Inter	Bologna	Loan
23 January 2015	Joshua Brillante	Fiorentina	Empoli	18-month loan
23 January 2015	Diego Frugoli	Empoli	Savona	Loan
23 January 2015	Andrea Cappa	Vicenza	Teramo	Loan
23 January 2015	Federico Serraiocco	Teramo	Vicenza	Loan
23 January 2015	Davide Petermann	Palermo	Torres	Loan
23 January 2015	Stefano Cerniglia	Palermo	Unattached	Released
23 January 2015	Sol Bamba	Palermo	Leeds United (England)	Loan
23 January 2015	Michele Fornasier	Sampdoria	Pescara	Loan
23 January 2015	Antimo Iunco	Trapani	Alessandria	Undisclosed
26 January 2015	Alberto Gilardino	Guangzhou Evergrande (China)	Fiorentina	Loan
26 January 2015	Mirko Pigliacelli	Parma	Frosinone	Undisclosed
26 January 2015	Matteo Mancosu	Trapani	Bologna	Undisclosed
26 January 2015	Andrea Marconi	Pro Vercelli	Como	Loan
26 January 2015	Marcelo Brozović	Dinamo Zagreb (Croatia)	Inter	18-month loan
26 January 2015	Granddi Ngoyi	Palermo	Leeds United (England)	Loan
26 January 2015	Antonio Cassano	Parma	Unattached	Released
26 January 2015	Mark Birighitti	Newcastle Jets (Australia)	Varese	Loan
26 January 2015	Adrián Calello	Catania	Unattached	Released
27 January 2015	Rubén Olivera	Brescia	Latina	Undisclosed
27 January 2015	Gennaro Tutino	Napoli	Gubbio	Loan
27 January 2015	Giuseppe Statella	Pro Vercelli	Cosenza	Undisclosed
27 January 2015	Dennis Scapinello	Varese	Lucchese	Loan
27 January 2015	Brayan Perea	Perugia	Lazio	Loan return
27 January 2015	Samuel Eto'o	Everton (England)	Sampdoria	Undisclosed
27 January 2015	Salvador Ichazo	Danubio (Uruguay)	Torino	Loan
27 January 2015	Uroš Ćosić	Pescara	Frosinone	Undisclosed
27 January 2015	Andrea Gessa	Frosinone	Pescara	Undisclosed
27 January 2015	Álvaro Pereira	Inter	Estudiantes (Argentina)	Loan
27 January 2015	Mapou Yanga-Mbiwa	Newcastle (England)	Roma	£5,5M
27 January 2015	Luca Menini	Mantova	Torino	Loan
27 January 2015	Alexandre Coeff	Udinese	Royal Mouscron (Belgium)	Loan
28 January 2015	Idriz Toskić	Chievo	Monza	Loan
28 January 2015	Giuseppe Figliomeni	Vicenza	Latina	Loan return
28 January 2015	Mato Jajalo	HNK Rijeka (Croatia)	Palermo	Undisclosed
28 January 2015	Salvatore Bocchetti	Spartak Moscow (Russia)	Milan	Loan
28 January 2015	Matti Lund Nielsen	Pescara	Perugia	Loan
28 January 2015	Riccardo Serpieri	Lazio	Cosenza	Undisclosed
28 January 2015	Nenê	Verona	Spezia	Loan
28 January 2015	David Milinković	BASK (Serbia)	Ternana	Undisclosed
29 January 2015	Matteo Bianchetti	Verona	Spezia	Loan
29 January 2015	Fabián Monzón	Catania	Boca Juniors (Argentina)	Loan
29 January 2015	Soufiane Bidaoui	Parma	Latina	Loan
29 January 2015	Steve Leo Beleck	Fiorentina	Mantova	Loan
29 January 2015	Gonzalo Escalante	Boca Juniors (Argentina)	Catania	Undisclosed
29 January 2015	Sdrjan Spiridonović	Vicenza	Messina	Loan
29 January 2015	Daniele Bazzoffia	Olhanense (Portugal)	Cittadella	Undisclosed
29 January 2015	Riccardo Ravasi	Verona	Pordenone	Loan
29 January 2015	Nicola Bellomo	Chievo	Bari	Loan
29 January 2015	Daniele Altobelli	Frosinone	Ascoli	Loan
29 January 2015	Michal Pecháček	FK Teplice (Czech Republic)	Udinese	Loan
29 January 2015	Andrea Razzitti	Brescia	Catanzaro	Loan
29 January 2015	Leonardo Mancuso	Cittadella	Catanzaro	Loan
29 January 2015	Kris Jogan	Verona	Kufstein (Austria)	Loan
30 January 2015	Bruno Petković	Catania	Reggiana	Loan
30 January 2015	Nicola Pasini	Genoa	Carpi	Loan
30 January 2015	Mattia Destro	Roma	Milan	Loan
30 January 2015	Fabio Aveni	Catania	Juve Stabia	Free
30 January 2015	Salvatore Molina	Atalanta	Carpi	Loan
30 January 2015	Mario Pugliese	Atalanta	Carpi	18-month loan
30 January 2015	Rafael Páez	Bologna	Liverpool (England)	Loan return
30 January 2015	Luca Berardocco	Parma	Como	Loan
30 January 2015	Daniele Franco	Spezia	Paganese	Loan
30 January 2015	Alexis Ferrante	Roma	Savoia	Loan
30 January 2015	Gianluca Musacci	Parma	Pro Vercelli	Loan
30 January 2015	Jean-François Gillet	Torino	Catania	Undisclosed
30 January 2015	Rene Krhin	Inter	Córdoba (Spain)	Loan
30 January 2015	Nabil Jaadi	Udinese	Latina	Loan
30 January 2015	Sebastián Leto	Catania	Lanús (Argentina)	Loan
30 January 2015	Diego Laxalt	Inter	Genoa	18-month loan
30 January 2015	Lorenzo Ariaudo	Sassuolo	Genoa	Loan
30 January 2015	Leonardo Pavoletti	Sassuolo	Genoa	Loan
30 January 2015	Francesco Acerbi	Genoa	Sassuolo	Co-ownership resolution
30 January 2015	Martí Riverola	Bologna	Altach (Austria)	Loan
30 January 2015	Paolo De Ceglie	Parma	Juventus	Loan return
30 January 2015	Miguel de las Cuevas	Osasuna (Spain)	Spezia	Undisclosed
30 January 2015	Emanuele Rovini	Udinese (& Empoli, c, t)	S.P.A.L.	Loan
30 January 2015	Urby Emanuelson	Roma	Atalanta	Undisclosed
31 January 2015	Danilo Ortiz	Cerro Porteño (Paraguay)	Palermo	Loan
31 January 2015	Giannis Fetfatzidis	Genoa	Chievo	Loan
31 January 2015	Seydou Doumbia	CSKA Moscow (Russia)	Roma	€14,4M
31 January 2015	Matteo Caracciolo	Sampdoria	Monza	Loan
31 January 2015	Stipe Perica	Chelsea (England)	Udinese	18-month loan
1 February 2015	Paul-Jose M'Poku	Standard Liège (Belgium)	Cagliari	Loan
1 February 2015	Giovanni Fenati	Sampdoria	Padova	Loan
1 February 2015	Andrea Mantovani	Unattached	Perugia	Free
1 February 2015	Víctor Ibarbo	Cagliari	Roma	Loan
1 February 2015	Álvaro González	Lazio	Torino	Loan
1 February 2015	Marco Capuano	Pescara	Cagliari	Loan
1 February 2015	Alassane També	Kortrijk (Belgium)	Genoa	Undisclosed
1 February 2015	Lucas Souza	Parma	Moreirense (Portugal)	Loan
2 February 2015	Marco Rossi	Perugia	Varese	Loan
2 February 2015	Ahmed Hegazy	Fiorentina	Perugia	Loan
2 February 2015	Nenad Krstičić	Sampdoria	Bologna	Loan
2 February 2015	Andrés Tello	Envigado (Colombia)	Juventus	Loan
2 February 2015	Daniele Gastaldello	Sampdoria	Bologna	Undisclosed
2 February 2015	Luca Antonelli	Genoa	Milan	Loan
2 February 2015	Ettore Gliozzi	Sassuolo	Forlì	Loan
2 February 2015	Sebastian Giovinco	Juventus	Toronto (Canada)	Free
2 February 2015	Thomas Mangani	Chievo	Angers (France)	Loan
2 February 2015	Dejan Lazarević	Chievo	Sassuolo	Loan
2 February 2015	Nicolò Ragnoli	Brescia	FeralpiSalò	Undisclosed
2 February 2015	Manuel Gullotta	Brescia	FeralpiSalò	Undisclosed
2 February 2015	Stefano Sturaro	Genoa	Juventus	Loan return
2 February 2015	Yassine Jebbour	Montpellier (France)	Varese	Loan
2 February 2015	Matteo D'Alessandro	Monza	Pro Vercelli	Free
2 February 2015	Gabriel Paletta	Parma	Milan	Undisclosed
2 February 2015	Alessandro Matri	Milan	Juventus	Loan
2 February 2015	Vid Belec	Konyaspor (Turkey)	Inter	Loan return
2 February 2015	Andrea Rispoli	Parma	Palermo	Loan
2 February 2015	Davis Curiale	Frosinone	Trapani	€150,000
2 February 2015	Marco Borriello	Roma	Genoa	Undisclosed
2 February 2015	Eros Pisano	Palermo	Verona	Loan
2 February 2015	Zouhair Feddal	Palermo	Parma	Loan return
2 February 2015	Anastasios Donis	Juventus	Sassuolo	Loan
2 February 2015	Matteo Malagoli	Bologna	Mantova	Loan
2 February 2015	Antonio Luna	Aston Villa (England)	Spezia	Loan
2 February 2015	Matteo Ardemagni	Atalanta	Perugia	Loan
2 February 2015	Zakarya Bergdich	Valladolid (Spain)	Genoa	Loan
2 February 2015	Daniele Giorico	Cagliari	Unione Venezia	Loan
2 February 2015	Edgar Çani	Catania	Leeds (England)	Loan
2 February 2015	Daniele Rugani	Empoli	Juventus	€3,5M (co-ownership resolution)
2 February 2015	Daniele Rugani	Juventus	Empoli	Loan
2 February 2015	Leonardo Spinazzola	Juventus	Vicenza	Loan
2 February 2015	Arturo Lupoli	Varese	Frosinone	Undisclosed
2 February 2015	Piergiuseppe Maritato	Vicenza	Como	Loan
2 February 2015	Marko Bulat	Verona	Varese	Loan
2 February 2015	Sergio Garufi	Catania	Santarcangelo	Loan
2 February 2015	Alessandro Capello	Cagliari	Varese	Loan
2 February 2015	Federico Bonazzoli	Inter	Sampdoria	Undisclosed
2 February 2015	Federico Bonazzoli	Sampdoria	Inter	Loan
2 February 2015	Antonio Loi	Cagliari	Carpi	18-month loan
2 February 2015	Federico Mattiello	Juventus	Chievo	Loan
2 February 2015	Aleandro Rosi	Genoa	Fiorentina	Loan
2 February 2015	Felipe dal Belo	Parma	Unattached	Released
2 February 2015	Stefano Lanini	Caronnese	Virtus Entella	Undisclosed
2 February 2015	Gaetano Masucci	Frosinone	Virtus Entella	Undisclosed
2 February 2015	Gianluca Litteri	Virtus Entella	Latina	Undisclosed
2 February 2015	Ferdinando Sforzini	Latina	Virtus Entella	Undisclosed
2 February 2015	Marco Modolo	Parma	Carpi	Loan
2 February 2015	Marcos de Paula	Chievo	Messina	Loan
2 February 2015	Ezequiel Muñoz	Palermo	Sampdoria	Loan
2 February 2015	Juan Cuadrado	Fiorentina	Chelsea (England)	Undisclosed
2 February 2015	Luca Castiglia	Juventus	Pro Vercelli	€1.5M (player swap)
2 February 2015	Giuseppe Ruggiero	Juventus	Pro Vercelli	Co-ownership resolution, €0.25M (player swap)
2 February 2015	Cristian Bunino	Pro Vercelli	Juventus	€1.75M (player swap)
2 February 2015	Cristian Bunino	Juventus	Pro Vercelli	18-month loan
2 February 2015	Tiberio Velocci	Genoa	Barletta	Undisclosed
2 February 2015	Andrea Favilli	Livorno	Juventus	Loan
2 February 2015	Armando Vajushi	Litex Lovech (Bulgaria)	Chievo	Loan
2 February 2015	Alberto Masi	Juventus	Ternana	Co-ownership resolution, €1.5M (part of Brignoli)
2 February 2015	Alberto Brignoli	Ternana	Juventus	€1.75M (€250,000 + Masi)
2 February 2015	Alberto Brignoli	Juventus	Ternana	Loan
2 February 2015	Cristiano Ingretolli	Pescara	Barletta	Loan
2 February 2015	Irakli Shekiladze	Latina	Südtirol	Loan
2 February 2015	Michele Somma	Roma	Empoli	Loan
2 February 2015	Nicola Pozzi	Parma	Chievo	Loan
2 February 2015	Rodney Strasser	Genoa	Livorno	Loan
2 February 2015	Victor da Silva	Chievo	Brescia	Loan
2 February 2015	Davide Santon	Newcastle (England)	Inter	Loan
2 February 2015	Mario Santana	Genoa	Frosinone	Loan
2 February 2015	Nadir Minotti	Atalanta	Foggia	Loan
2 February 2015	Oualid El Hasni	Vicenza	Monza	Loan
2 February 2015	Vítor Saba	Brescia	Crotone	Undisclosed
2 February 2015	Alessandro Comentale	Torino	Monza	Loan
2 February 2015	Lorenzo Del Prete	Perugia	Catania	Undisclosed
2 February 2015	Afriyie Acquah	TSG Hoffenheim (Germany)	Sampdoria	Loan
2 February 2015	Simone Benedetti	Cagliari	Bari	Loan
2 February 2015	Ignacio Lores Varela	Palermo	Varese	Loan
2 February 2015	Giuseppe Rizzo	Reggina	Perugia	Loan
2 February 2015	Tommaso Biasci	Livorno	Paganese	Loan
2 February 2015	Wilfred Osuji	Modena	Varese	Loan
2 February 2015	Denis Tonucci	Modena	Brescia	Loan
2 February 2015	Alan Empereur	Fiorentina	Livorno	Undisclosed
2 February 2015	Emanuel Rivas	Varese	Livorno	Free
2 February 2015	Luca Munarini	Atalanta	Savona	Loan
2 February 2015	Nicolò Tonon	Atalanta	Savona	Loan
2 February 2015	Michael Rabušic	Verona	Crotone	Loan
2 February 2015	Nicolás Spolli	Catania	Roma	Loan
2 February 2015	Mohamed Salah	Chelsea (England)	Fiorentina	Loan
2 February 2015	Alessandro Sbaffo	Chievo	Avellino	Loan
2 February 2015	Ali Sowe	Chievo	Latina	Loan
2 February 2015	Myles Anderson	Monza	Chievo	Undisclosed
2 February 2015	Davide Luppi	Modena	Pro Vercelli	Loan
2 February 2015	Badara Sarr	Parma	Catanzaro	Loan
2 February 2015	Kenneth Zohore	Fiorentina	Unattached	Released
2 February 2015	Stefano Pettinari	Roma	Pescara	Loan
2 February 2015	Cristiano Ingretolli	Pescara	Barletta	Loan
2 February 2015	Marco Sansovini	Virtus Entella	Pescara	Loan
2 February 2015	Luciano Abecasis	River Plate (Argentina)	Pescara	Loan
2 February 2015	Alessandro Bruno	Latina	Pescara	Undisclosed
2 February 2015	Aniello Cutolo	Pescara	Virtus Entella	Undisclosed
2 February 2015	Oleksandr Yakovenko	Fiorentina	ADO Den Haag (Netherlands)	Loan
2 February 2015	Simone Dejori	Sampdoria	Pavia	Loan
2 February 2015	Stefano Beltrame	Sampdoria	Juventus	Co-ownership resolution, €1M (player swap)
2 February 2015	Jakub Hromada	Juventus	Sampdoria	€0.6M (player swap)
2 February 2015	Jakub Hromada	Sampdoria	Pro Vercelli	Loan
2 February 2015	Atila Varga	Juventus	Sampdoria	€0.4M (player swap)
2 February 2015	Nicholas Muzzi	Cagliari	Sampdoria	Undisclosed
11 February 2015	Gaby Mudingayi	Unattached	Cesena	Free
3 March 2015	Cesare Natali	Unattached	Sassuolo	Free
