= 2012–13 Juventus FC season =

Italian football club season

Juventus
2012–13 season
- Chairman: Andrea Agnelli
- Head coach: Antonio Conte
- Stadium: Juventus Stadium
- Serie A: 1st
- Supercoppa Italiana: Winners
- Coppa Italia: Semi-finals
- UEFA Champions League: Quarter-finals
- Top goalscorer: League: Arturo Vidal, Mirko Vučinić (10); All: Arturo Vidal (15)
- Highest home attendance: 40,823 vs Bayern Munich (10 April 2013, Champions League)
- Lowest home attendance: 18,932 vs Cagliari (8 January 2013, Coppa Italia)
- Average home league attendance: 38,979
Home colours	Away colours	Third colours

The 2012–13 season was Juventus Football Club's 115th in existence and sixth consecutive season in the top flight of Italian football. The club won their second Serie A title in a row.

The season was the first since 1992–93 without former Captain and legend Alessandro del Piero, who joined Australian Club Sydney FC.

== 2011–12 Italian football scandal ==
The events were overshadowed by the recent Calcioscommesse scandals. First team manager Antonio Conte, his assistant Angelo Alessio, technical director Christian Stellini and players Leonardo Bonucci and Simone Pepe were among the accused. Stellini, Bonucci and Pepe were later acquitted, but Stellini resigned from his position in August 2012. Club president Andrea Agnelli released a statement stating his support for the staff and players. Conte and his assistant Angelo Alessio were handed ten-month and eight-month touchline bans respectively by the FIGC disciplinary committee and public prosecution office. Agnelli publicly announced the club's intention to appeal the charges. Team coach Massimo Carrera was appointed caretaker manager for the duration of Conte's ban. Conte returned to his position in December 2012 for the match against Palermo. Conte and Alessio were at Siena at the time the scandal took place, so Juventus itself was not penalized for any wrongdoing. No one involved with Juventus at the time was implicated in the scandal.

== Players ==
=== Squad information ===
Players and squad numbers last updated on 31 January 2013.
Note: Flags indicate national team as has been defined under FIFA eligibility rules. Players may hold more than one non-FIFA nationality.

No.	Name	Nat	Position(s)	Signed in	Contract ends	Date of birth (Age at end of season)	Signed from	Apps.	Goals	Notes
Goalkeepers
1	Gianluigi Buffon	(Italy)	GK	2001	2015	28 January 1978 (aged 35)	(Italy) Parma	440	0	Captain
30	Marco Storari	(Italy)	GK	2010	2014	7 January 1977 (aged 36)	(Italy) AC Milan	46	0	
31	Laurenţiu Brănescu	(Romania)	GK	2012	2015	30 March 1994 (aged 19)	(Italy) Youth Sector	0	0	
34	Rubinho	(Brazil)	GK	2012	2013	4 August 1982 (aged 30)	Unattached	1	0	
Defenders
3	Giorgio Chiellini	(Italy)	CB / LB	2005	2015	14 August 1984 (aged 28)	(Italy) Fiorentina	278	24	Vice-captain
4	Martín Cáceres	(Uruguay)	CB / RB	2012	2016	7 April 1987 (aged 26)	(Spain) Sevilla	57	5	
11	Paolo De Ceglie	(Italy)	LB / LWB	2008	2017	17 September 1986 (aged 26)	(Italy) Youth Sector	120	2	
13	Federico Peluso	(Italy)	CB / LB	2013	2013	20 January 1984 (aged 29)	(Italy) Atalanta	17	1	on loan from Atalanta
15	Andrea Barzagli	(Italy)	CB	2011	2015	8 May 1981 (aged 32)	(Germany) Wolfsburg	102	1	
19	Leonardo Bonucci	(Italy)	CB	2010	2017	1 May 1987 (aged 26)	(Italy) Bari	129	4	
26	Stephan Lichtsteiner	(Switzerland)	RB / RWB	2011	2015	16 January 1984 (aged 29)	(Italy) Lazio	74	6	
Midfielders
6	Paul Pogba	(France)	DM / CM	2012	2016	15 March 1993 (aged 20)	(England) Manchester United	37	5	
7	Simone Pepe	(Italy)	LW / RW	2010	2015	30 August 1983 (aged 29)	(Italy) Udinese	76	11	
8	Claudio Marchisio	(Italy)	CM / AM	2006	2016	19 January 1986 (aged 27)	(Italy) Youth Sector	213	28	Vice-captain
20	Simone Padoin	(Italy)	RM / CM	2012	2016	18 March 1984 (aged 29)	(Italy) Atalanta	33	1	
21	Andrea Pirlo	(Italy)	CM / AM / DM	2011	2014	19 May 1979 (aged 34)	(Italy) AC Milan	86	8	
22	Kwadwo Asamoah	(Ghana)	CM / LM / LB	2012	2017	9 December 1988 (aged 24)	(Italy) Udinese	36	3	
23	Arturo Vidal	(Chile)	DM / CM / CB	2011	2016	22 May 1987 (aged 26)	(Germany) Bayer Leverkusen	80	22	
24	Emanuele Giaccherini	(Italy)	LW / CM	2011	2015	5 May 1985 (aged 28)	(Italy) Cesena	52	6	
33	Mauricio Isla	(Chile)	RW / RM / CM	2012	2017	12 June 1988 (aged 25)	(Italy) Udinese	20	0	
39	Luca Marrone	(Italy)	CM / DM / CB	2009	2015	28 March 1990 (aged 23)	(Italy) Youth Sector	23	1	
Forwards
9	Mirko Vučinić	(Montenegro)	ST / CF	2011	2015	1 October 1983 (aged 29)	(Italy) Roma	78	24	
12	Sebastian Giovinco	(Italy)	CF / LW / ST	2012	2015	26 January 1987 (aged 26)	(Italy) Parma	91	15	
17	Nicklas Bendtner	(Denmark)	CF	2012	2013	16 January 1988 (aged 25)	(England) Arsenal	11	0	on loan from Arsenal
18	Nicolas Anelka	(France)	ST / CF	2013	2013	14 March 1979 (aged 34)	(China) Shanghai Shenhua	3	0	
27	Fabio Quagliarella	(Italy)	ST / CF	2010	2015	31 January 1983 (aged 30)	(Italy) Napoli	79	26	
32	Alessandro Matri	(Italy)	ST	2011	2017	19 August 1984 (aged 28)	(Italy) Cagliari	83	29	
35	Stefano Beltrame	(Italy)	ST / CF	2013	-	8 February 1993 (aged 20)	(Italy) Youth Sector	1	0	Moving from Juventus Academy
Players transferred during the season
2	Lúcio	(Brazil)	CB	2012	–	8 May 1978 (aged 35)	(Italy) Internazionale	4	0	Contract Terminated
5	Alberto Masi	(Italy)	CB	2012	2017	2 September 1992 (aged 20)	(Italy) Pro Vercelli	0	0	on loan to Ternana
13	Nicola Leali	(Italy)	GK	2012	2017	17 February 1993 (aged 20)	(Italy) Brescia	0	0	on loan to Virtus Lanciano
18	Richmond Boakye	(Ghana)	ST / CF	2012	2017	28 January 1993 (aged 20)	(Italy) Genoa	0	0	on loan to Sassuolo

== Transfers ==
=== In ===
No.	Pos.	Nat.	Name	Age	EU	Moving from	Type	Transfer window	Ends	Transfer fee	Source
4	DF	(Uruguay)	Martín Cáceres	25	Non-EU	Sevilla	Full ownership	Summer	2016	€8M	Juventus.com
24	MF	(Italy)	Emanuele Giaccherini	27	EU	Cesena	Full ownership	Summer	2015	€4.25M	Juventus.com
22	MF	(Ghana)	Kwadwo Asamoah	24	Non-EU	Udinese	Co-ownership	Summer	2015	€9M	Juventus.com
33	MF	(Chile)	Mauricio Isla	24	Non-EU	Udinese	Co-ownership	Summer	2015	€9.4M	Juventus.com
12	FW	(Italy)	Sebastian Giovinco	26	EU	Parma	Full ownership	Summer	2015	€11M	Juventus.com
—	GK	(Italy)	Nicola Leali	19	EU	Brescia	Full ownership	Summer	2017	€3.8M	Tuttosport.com
2	DF	(Brazil)	Lúcio	34	EU	Internazionale	Full ownership	Summer	2014	Free	Tuttosport.com
—	DF	(Italy)	Alberto Masi	20	EU	Pro Vercelli	Full ownership	Summer	2017	€2M	Goal.com
—	FW	(Ghana)	Richmond Boakye	20	EU	Genoa	Co-ownership	Summer	2017	€4M	Juventus.com
6	MF	(France)	Paul Pogba	19	EU	Manchester United	Full ownership	Summer	2016	Free	Juventus.com
34	GK	(Brazil)	Rubinho	30	EU	Palermo	Full ownership	Summer	2013	Free	Juventus.com
17	FW	(Denmark)	Nicklas Bendtner	25	EU	Arsenal	Loan	Summer	2013	€1.5M	Juventus.com
13	DF	(Italy)	Federico Peluso	29	EU	Atalanta	Loan	Winter	2013	€1.5M	eurosport.yahoo.com
18	ST	(France)	Nicolas Anelka	33	EU	Shanghai Shenhua	Loan	Winter	2013	Loan	
55	MF	(Ecuador)	José Cevallos	18	Non-EU	LDU Quito	Loan	Winter	2013	Undisclosed	Juventus.com

Total spending: ▼€54.45 million

=== Out ===
No.	Pos.	Nat.	Name	Age	EU	Moving to	Type	Transfer window	Transfer fee	Source
10	FW	(Italy)	Alessandro Del Piero	37	EU	Sydney (Australia)	Contract Ended	Summer	Free	Juventus.com
13	GK	(Austria)	Alexander Manninger	35	EU	FC Augsburg (Germany)	Contract Ended	Summer	—	
6	DF	(Italy)	Fabio Grosso	34	EU		Contract Ended	Summer	—	
23	FW	(Italy)	Marco Borriello	30	EU	Roma	Loan Ended	Summer	—	
27	MF	(Paraguay)	Marcelo Estigarribia	24	EU	Deportivo Maldonado (Uruguay)	Loan Ended	Summer	—	
—	MF	(Italy)	Christian Pasquato	22	EU	Udinese	Co-ownership	Summer	€1.5M	Juventus.com
17	MF	(Netherlands)	Eljero Elia	25	EU	Werder Bremen (Germany)	Full ownership	Summer	€7.5M	Juventus.com
27	MF	(Serbia)	Miloš Krasić	27	Non-EU	Fenerbahçe (Turkey)	Full ownership	Summer	€7M	Goal.com
2	DF	(Italy)	Marco Motta	26	EU	Bologna	Loan	Summer	€1.5M	Juventus.com
—	MF	(Brazil)	Felipe Melo	29	EU	Galatasaray (Turkey)	Loan	Summer	€1.75M	Galatasaray.org
—	MF	(Italy)	Elio De Silvestro	19	EU	Pro Vercelli	Co-ownership	Summer	€0.8M	Juventus.com
—	GK	(Italy)	Nicola Leali	19	EU	Virtus Lanciano	Loan	Summer	Free	Virtuslanciano.it
—	MF	(Italy)	Michele Pazienza	29	EU	Bologna	Full ownership	Summer	€0.5M	Juventus.com
—	MF	(Uruguay)	Jorge Andrés Martínez	29	EU	CFR Cluj (Romania)	Loan	Summer	Free	Juventus.com
—	DF	(Switzerland)	Reto Ziegler	26	EU	Lokomotiv Moscow (Russia)	Loan	Summer	Free	Juventus.com
2	DF	(Brazil)	Lúcio	34	EU	São Paulo (Brazil)	Contract Terminated	Winter	—	Juventus.com
—	DF	(Switzerland)	Reto Ziegler	27	EU	Fenerbahçe (Turkey)	Loan	Winter	Free	

Total revenue: ▲€20.55 million

Net Expenditure: ▼€33.9 million

=== Reserve squad ===
Note: Flags indicate national team as defined under FIFA eligibility rules; some limited exceptions apply. Players may hold more than one non-FIFA nationality.

No.	Pos.	Nation	Player
—	FW	ITA	Vincenzo Iaquinta

=== On loan ===
Note: Flags indicate national team as defined under FIFA eligibility rules; some limited exceptions apply. Players may hold more than one non-FIFA nationality.

No.	Pos.	Nation	Player
—	GK	ITA	Nicola Leali (to Virtus Lanciano)
—	GK	ITA	Timothy Nocchi (to Juve Stabia)
—	GK	ITA	Marco Costantino (to Vallée d’Aoste)
—	DF	ITA	Marco Motta (to Bologna)
—	DF	ITA	Raffaele Alcibiade (to Honvéd)
—	DF	ITA	Salvatore D'Elia (to Venezia)
—	DF	ITA	Alberto Masi (to Ternana)
—	DF	FRA	Prince-Désir Gouano (to Vicenza)
—	MF	SUI	Reto Ziegler (to Fenerbahçe)
—	DF	ITA	Matteo Liviero (to Perugia)
—	MF	BRA	Felipe Melo (to Galatasaray)
—	MF	ITA	Manuel Giandonato (to Vicenza)
—	MF	ITA	Fausto Rossi (to Brescia)
—	MF	BRA	Gabriel Appelt Pires (to Pro Vercelli)

No.	Pos.	Nation	Player
—	MF	NED	Ouasim Bouy (to Brescia)
—	MF	ITA	Raffaele Bianco (to Carpi)
—	MF	URU	Jorge Andrés Martínez (to CFR Cluj)
—	FW	ITA	Francesco Margiotta (to Carrarese)
—	FW	ITA	Leonardo Spinazzola (to Empoli)
—	GK	ITA	Francesco Anacoura (co-ownership with Parma, on loan to Parma reserve)
—	GK	ITA	Alberto Gallinetta (co-ownership with Parma, on loan to FeralpiSalò)
—	DF	ITA	Nazzareno Belfasti (co-ownership with Modena, on loan to Gubbio)
—	MF	ITA	Carlo Ilari (with Ascoli, on loan to FeralpiSalò)
—	MF	AUT	Marcel Büchel (co-ownership with Siena, on loan to Cremonese)
—	FW	GHA	Richmond Boakye (co-ownership with Genoa, on loan to Sassuolo)
—	FW	ITA	Manolo Gabbiadini (co-ownership with Atalanta, on loan to Bologna)
—	FW	ITA	Niko Bianconi (co-ownership with Vicenza, on loan to Poggibonsi)
—	FW	ITA	Luca Del Papa (co-ownership with Pescara, on loan to Honvéd)

Loan deals expire 30 June 2013

=== Co-ownership ===
Note: Flags indicate national team as defined under FIFA eligibility rules; some limited exceptions apply. Players may hold more than one non-FIFA nationality.

No.	Pos.	Nation	Player
—	GK	ITA	Carlo Pinsoglio (with Vicenza)
—	DF	DEN	Frederik Sørensen (with Bologna)
—	DF	ITA	Andrea De Paola (with Carpi, on loan to Carrarese)
—	MF	GHA	Yussif Raman Chibsah (with Parma, on loan to Sassuolo)
—	MF	ITA	Elio De Silvestro (with Pro Vercelli)
—	MF	ITA	Simone Esposito (with Grosseto)
—	MF	AUS	James Troisi (with Atalanta)

No.	Pos.	Nation	Player
—	MF	ITA	Andrea Schiavone (with Siena, remains in Juventus reserve)
—	FW	ITA	Cristian Pasquato (with Udinese, on loan to Bologna)
—	FW	ITA	Ciro Immobile (with Genoa)
—	FW	ITA	Filippo Boniperti (with Parma)
—	FW	ITA	Riccardo Maniero (with Pescara, on loan to Ternana)
—	FW	ITA	Alberto Libertazzi (with Novara)

Co-ownership deals expire 21 June 2013

=== Non-playing staff ===
Position	Staff
Manager	(Italy) Antonio Conte
Assistant coach	(Italy) Angelo Alessio
First-team Coach	(Italy) Massimo Carrera
Goalkeepers' coach	(Italy) Claudio Filippi
Head of Fitness	(Italy) Paolo Bertelli
Fitness coach	(Spain) Julio Tous
Fitness coach	(Italy) Costantino Coratti
Head of Training Check	(Italy) Roberto Sassi

Source: Juventus.com (archive link)

== Pre-season and friendlies ==
17 July 2012 Friendly	Juventus	7–1	Aygreville	Saint-Vincent
15:30 CEST (UTC+02:00)	Quagliarella 7', 23'; Vučinić 21' (pen.); Matri 56' (pen.); Boakye 65'; Vidal 90+1' (pen.); Padovan 90+3'	Report	Turato 1'	Stadium: Saint-Vincent’s Stadio; Referee: Restaldo

21 July 2012 TIM Trophy	Internazionale	1–0	Juventus	Bari
20:45 CEST (UTC+02:00)	Coutinho 12'	Report		Stadium: Stadio San Nicola; Referee: Carmine Russo

21 July 2012 TIM Trophy	AC Milan	0–1	Juventus	Bari
21:45 CEST (UTC+02:00)	Robinho (yellow card) 34'	Report	Vučinić 31' (pen.); Pepe (yellow card) 37'	Stadium: Stadio San Nicola; Referee: Marco Guida

28 July 2012 Friendly	Hertha BSC	0–2	Juventus	Berlin, Germany
15:15 CEST (UTC+02:00)		Report	Matri 20'; Krasić 90'	Stadium: Olympiastadion; Referee: Bastian Dankert (Germany)

1 August 2012 Friendly	Benfica	1–1	Juventus	Geneva, Switzerland
19:00 CEST (UTC+02:00)	Pereira (yellow card) 48'; Luisão (yellow card) 76'; Cardozo 88'	Report	Vidal (yellow card) 51'; Krasić 90+2'	Stadium: Stade de Genève; Referee: Stephan Studer (Switzerland)

4 August 2012 Friendly	Juventus	2–0	Málaga	Salerno
20:45 CEST (UTC+02:00)	Matri 3', 51'	Report		Stadium: Stadio Arechi; Referee: Domenico Celi (Italy)

16 August 2012 Friendly	Juventus	5–1	Juventus Primavera	Villar Perosa
17:00 CEST (UTC+02:00)	Quagliarella 25'; Matri 56'; Giaccherini 64'; Giovinco 74'; Ruggiero 76'	Report	Bonatini 62'	Referee: Luca Colosimo

19 August 2012 Luigi Berlusconi; Trophy	AC Milan	2–3	Juventus	Milan
21:00 CEST (UTC+02:00)	Robinho 9', 77' (pen.); Yepes (yellow card) 67'	Report	Marchisio 12'; Vidal (yellow card) 14', (goal) 44'; Matri 63'; Masi (yellow card) 77'	Stadium: San Siro; Referee: Marco Guida

== Competitions ==
=== Supercoppa Italiana ===
11 August 2012	Juventus	4–2 (a.e.t.)	Napoli	Beijing, China
20:00 CEST (UTC+02:00)	Asamoah 37'; Vidal 74' (pen.); Lichtsteiner (yellow card) 76'; Giovinco (yellow card) 90+2'; Maggio 97' (o.g.); Vučinić 101'; Bonucci (yellow card) 112'		Cavani 27', (yellow card) 64'; Britos (yellow card) 32'; Pandev 41', (red card) 85'; Cannavaro (yellow card) 52'; Behrami (yellow card) 53'; Zúñiga (yellow card) 76' (yellow-red card) 90+3'	Stadium: Beijing National Stadium; Attendance: 65,000; Referee: Paolo Mazzoleni

=== Serie A ===
The fixtures for the 2012–13 Serie A were announced on 26 July 2012. The season starts on Saturday 25 August 2012 with Juventus taking on Parma at the Juventus Stadium, and ends Sunday 19 May 2013 with a match away against Sampdoria.

==== League table ====
Pos	Team	Pld	W	D	L	GF	GA	GD	Pts	Qualification or relegation
1	Juventus (C)	38	27	6	5	71	24	+47	87	Qualification for the Champions League group stage
2	Napoli	38	23	9	6	73	36	+37	78	Qualification for the Champions League group stage
3	Milan	38	21	9	8	67	39	+28	72	Qualification for the Champions League play-off round
4	Fiorentina	38	21	7	10	72	44	+28	70	Qualification for the Europa League play-off round
5	Udinese	38	18	12	8	59	45	+14	66	Qualification for the Europa League third qualifying round

Source: Serie A, Soccerway
Rules for classification: 1st points; 2nd head-to-head points; 3rd head-to-head goal difference; 4th goal difference; 5th number of goals scored; 6th public draw.
(Head-to-head record is applied for clubs with the same number of points only once all matches between said clubs have been played)
(C) Champions

==== Results summary ====
Overall								Home						Away					
Pld	W	D	L	GF	GA	GD	Pts	W	D	L	GF	GA	GD	W	D	L	GF	GA	GD
38	27	6	5	71	24	+47	87	14	3	2	36	10	+26	13	3	3	35	14	+21

Last updated: 19 May 2013.
Source: Competitive matches

==== Results by round ====
Round	1	2	3	4	5	6	7	8	9	10	11	12	13	14	15	16	17	18	19	20	21	22	23	24	25	26	27	28	29	30	31	32	33	34	35	36	37	38
Ground	H	A	A	H	A	H	A	H	A	H	H	A	H	A	H	A	H	A	H	A	H	H	A	H	A	H	A	H	A	A	H	A	H	A	H	A	H	A
Result	W	W	W	W	D	W	W	W	W	W	L	W	D	L	W	W	W	W	L	D	W	D	W	W	L	W	D	W	W	W	W	W	W	W	W	W	D	L
Position	5	1	1	1	1	1	1	1	1	1	1	1	1	1	1	1	1	1	1	1	1	1	1	1	1	1	1	1	1	1	1	1	1	1	1	1	1	1

Updated to match(es) played on 19 May 2013. Source: Competitive matches
A = Away; H = Home; W = Win; D = Draw; L = Loss

==== Matches ====
25 August 2012 1	Juventus	2–0	Parma	Turin
20:30 CEST (UTC+02:00)	Giovinco (yellow card) 11'; Vidal (penalty missed) 34'; Lichtsteiner 54'; Pirlo 59'; Marchisio (yellow card) 75'	Report	Biabiany (yellow card) 4'; Acquah (yellow card) 25'; Lucarelli (yellow card) 64'; Mirante (yellow card) 65'; Paletta (yellow card) 67'; Valdés (yellow card) 73'	Stadium: Juventus Stadium; Attendance: 37,771; Referee: Andrea Romeo

2 September 2012 2	Udinese	1–4	Juventus	Udine
18:00 CEST (UTC+02:00)	Brkić (red card) 12'; Pinzi (yellow card) 17'; Armero (yellow card) 34'; Domizzi (yellow card) 77'; Lazzari 78'	Report	Vidal 14' (pen.); Marchisio (yellow card) 37'; Bonucci (yellow card) 40'; Vučinić 45+1'; Giovinco 53', 71'; Matri (yellow card) 85'	Stadium: Stadio Friuli; Attendance: 27,543; Referee: Paolo Valeri

15 September 2012 3	Genoa	1–3	Juventus	Genoa
15:00 CEST (UTC+02:00)	Immobile 18', (yellow card) 18'; Canini (yellow card) 63'	Report	Pirlo (yellow card) 25'; Bonucci (yellow card) 43'; Giaccherini 61'; Barzagli (yellow card) 69'; Vučinić 78' (pen.); Asamoah 84'	Stadium: Stadio Luigi Ferraris; Attendance: 24,854; Referee: Gianluca Rocchi

22 September 2012 4	Juventus	2–0	Chievo	Turin
20:45 CEST (UTC+02:00)	Quagliarella 63', 68'	Report	Moscardelli (yellow card) 90+2'; Sorrentino (yellow card) 90+2'	Stadium: Juventus Stadium; Attendance: 38,369; Referee: Carmine Russo

25 September 2012 5	Fiorentina	0–0	Juventus	Florence
20:45 CEST (UTC+02:00)	Pizarro (yellow card) 39'; Gonzalo (yellow card) 45'; Ljajić (yellow card) 49'	Report	Vidal (yellow card) 56'	Stadium: Stadio Artemio Franchi; Attendance: 38,440; Referee: Paolo Tagliavento

29 September 2012 6	Juventus	4–1	Roma	Turin
20:45 CEST (UTC+02:00)	Pirlo 11'; Vidal 16' (pen.), (yellow card) 81'; Matri 19', (yellow card) 71'; Bonucci (yellow card) 68'; Vučinić (yellow card) 89'; Giovinco 90'	Report	Taddei (yellow card) 10'; Castán (yellow card) 15'; Burdisso (yellow card) 20'; Balzaretti (yellow card) 27'; Osvaldo 69' (pen.)	Stadium: Juventus Stadium; Attendance: 39,221; Referee: Nicola Rizzoli

7 October 2012 7	Siena	1–2	Juventus	Siena
15:00 CEST (UTC+02:00)	Felipe (yellow card) 13'; Zé Eduardo (yellow card) 26'; Rosina (yellow card) 45+1'; Calaiò 45+2'; Neto (yellow card) 66'; Paci (yellow card) 76'; Sestu (yellow card) 87'; Vergassola (yellow card) 90+3'	Report	Pirlo 14'; Chiellini (yellow card) 22'; De Ceglie (yellow card) 45+1'; Marchisio 85'; Vučinić (yellow card) 90+3'	Stadium: Stadio Artemio Franchi – Montepaschi Arena; Attendance: 15,373; Referee: Paolo Mazzoleni

20 October 2012 8	Juventus	2–0	Napoli	Turin
18:00 CEST (UTC+02:00)	Vidal (yellow card) 30'; Chiellini (yellow card) 64'; Barzagli (yellow card) 69'; Cáceres 80', (yellow card) 80'; Pogba 82'	Report	Cavani (yellow card) 30'; Campagnaro (yellow card) 64'; Inler (yellow card) 90'	Stadium: Juventus Stadium; Attendance: 40,513; Referee: Antonio Damato

28 October 2012 9	Catania	0–1	Juventus	Catania
12:30 CET (UTC+01:00)	Rolín (yellow card) 19'; Spolli (yellow card) 28'; Barrientos (yellow card) 33'; Marchese (yellow card) 35' (yellow-red card) 67'; Legrottaglie (yellow card) 39'	Report	Asamoah (yellow card) 23'; Vidal 57', (yellow card) 68'; Padoin (yellow card) 90+2'	Stadium: Stadio Angelo Massimino; Attendance: 20,381; Referee: Andrea Gervasoni

31 October 2012 10	Juventus	2–1	Bologna	Turin
20:45 CET (UTC+01:00)	Pirlo (yellow card) 47'; Quagliarella 54'; Pogba 90+2'	Report	Pazienza (yellow card) 9'; Motta (yellow card) 61'; Taïder 71'; Kone (yellow card) 83'	Stadium: Juventus Stadium; Attendance: 38,895; Referee: Andrea Romeo

3 November 2012 11	Juventus	1–3	Internazionale	Turin
20:45 CET (UTC+01:00)	Vidal 1'; Lichtsteiner (yellow card) 30'; Pirlo (yellow card) 47'; Chiellini (yellow card) 51'; Bonucci (yellow card) 62'	Report	Samuel (yellow card) 33'; Milito 58' (pen.), 75'; Zanetti (yellow card) 84'; Palacio 89'	Stadium: Juventus Stadium; Attendance: 40,563; Referee: Paolo Tagliavento

11 November 2012 12	Pescara	1–6	Juventus	Pescara
20:45 CET (UTC+01:00)	Jonathas (yellow card) 18'; Cascione 25'; Modesto (yellow card) 67'	Report	Vidal 9'; Quagliarella 22', 45', 53'; Asamoah 30'; Giovinco 37'; Pirlo (yellow card) 40'	Stadium: Stadio Adriatico; Attendance: 20,355; Referee: Luca Banti

17 November 2012 13	Juventus	0–0	Lazio	Turin
18:00 CET (UTC+01:00)	Bonucci (yellow card) 48'; Vidal (yellow card) 90+5'	Report	Marchetti (yellow card) 52'; Ledesma (yellow card) 89'	Stadium: Juventus Stadium; Attendance: 38,839; Referee: Daniele Orsato

24 November 2012 14	AC Milan	1–0	Juventus	Milan
20:45 CET (UTC+01:00)	Nocerino (yellow card) 17'; Robinho 31' (pen.); Yepes (yellow card) 90+4'	Report	Isla (yellow card) 30'; Bonucci (yellow card) 43'; Marchisio (yellow card) 86'; Giovinco (yellow card) 90+4'	Stadium: San Siro; Attendance: 77,023; Referee: Nicola Rizzoli

1 December 2012 15	Juventus	3–0	Torino	Turin
20:45 CET (UTC+01:00)	De Ceglie (yellow card) 19'; Pirlo (penalty missed) 41'; Marchisio 57', 84'; Barzagli (yellow card) 59'; Giovinco (yellow card) 63', (goal) 67'; Vučinić (yellow card) 80'	Report	Basha (yellow card) 21'; Glik (red card) 36'	Stadium: Juventus Stadium; Attendance: 40,042; Referee: Gianluca Rocchi

8 December 2012 16	Palermo	0–1	Juventus	Palermo
15:00 CET (UTC+01:00)	Morganella (yellow card) 67' (yellow-red card) 75'	Report	Lichtsteiner (yellow card) 37', (goal) 50'; Pirlo (yellow card) 78'; Bonucci (yellow card) 87'	Stadium: Stadio Renzo Barbera; Attendance: 22,738; Referee: Andrea De Marco

16 December 2012 17	Juventus	3–0	Atalanta	Turin
15:00 CET (UTC+01:00)	Vučinić 2'; Pirlo 14'; Marchisio 27'	Report	Manfredini (yellow card) 30' (yellow-red card) 31'	Stadium: Juventus Stadium; Attendance: 38,625; Referee: Davide Massa

21 December 2012 18	Cagliari	1–3	Juventus	Parma
20:45 CET (UTC+01:00)	Pinilla 16' (pen.); Ariaudo (yellow card) 20'; Murru (yellow card) 29'; Astori (yellow card) 37' (yellow-red card) 65'; Dessena (yellow card) 57'; Pisano (yellow card) 60'	Report	Vidal (yellow card) 27', (penalty missed) 73; Lichtsteiner (yellow card) 54'; Matri 75', 90+2'; Vučinić 90+5'	Stadium: Stadio Ennio Tardini; Attendance: 8,500; Referee: Antonio Damato

5 January 2013 19	Juventus	1–2	Sampdoria	Turin
15:00 CET (UTC+01:00)	Giovinco 24' (pen.); Pogba (yellow card) 27'; Bonucci (yellow card) 39'; Peluso (yellow card) 84'; Pirlo (yellow card) 90+4'	Report	Poli (yellow card) 17'; Berardi (yellow card) 23' (yellow-red card) 31'; Icardi 52', 68', (yellow card) 90+4'; Krstičić (yellow card) 76'; Romero (yellow card) 83'	Stadium: Juventus Stadium; Attendance: 38,401; Referee: Paolo Valeri

13 January 2013 20	Parma	1–1	Juventus	Parma
15:00 CET (UTC+01:00)	Paletta (yellow card) 45'; Sansone 77'; Acquah (yellow card) 90+3'	Report	Padoin (yellow card) 24'; Pirlo 52'	Stadium: Stadio Ennio Tardini; Attendance: 19,073; Referee: Andrea De Marco

19 January 2013 21	Juventus	4–0	Udinese	Turin
20:45 CET (UTC+01:00)	Vidal (yellow card) 17'; Pogba 41', 66'; Vučinić 72'; Matri 80'	Report	Pinzi (yellow card) 40'; Muriel (yellow card) 60'	Stadium: Juventus Stadium; Attendance: 36,556; Referee: Luca Banti

26 January 2013 22	Juventus	1–1	Genoa	Turin
20:45 CET (UTC+01:00)	Quagliarella 54'; Vučinić (yellow card) 90+3'; Lichtsteiner (yellow card) 90+4'	Report	Granqvist (yellow card) 25'; Matuzalém (yellow card) 50'; Borriello (yellow card) 64', (goal) 68'; Antonelli (yellow card) 74'	Stadium: Juventus Stadium; Attendance: 36,668; Referee: Marco Guida

3 February 2013 23	Chievo	1–2	Juventus	Verona
12:30 CET (UTC+01:00)	Cesar (yellow card) 36'; Théréau 53'; Cofie (yellow card) 63'	Report	Matri 10'; Lichtsteiner 42'; De Ceglie (yellow card) 71'	Stadium: Stadio Marc'Antonio Bentegodi; Attendance: 22,000; Referee: Mauro Bergonzi

9 February 2013 24	Juventus	2–0	Fiorentina	Turin
18:00 CET (UTC+01:00)	Vučinić 20'; Matri 41'; Marchisio (yellow card) 56'; Peluso (yellow card) 58'	Report	Cuadrado (yellow card) 52'; Viviano (yellow card) 75'; Pizarro (yellow card) 86'	Stadium: Juventus Stadium; Attendance: 40,517; Referee: Paolo Mazzoleni

16 February 2013 25	Roma	1–0	Juventus	Rome
20:45 CET (UTC+01:00)	De Rossi (yellow card) 18'; Totti (yellow card) 31', (goal) 58'	Report	Lichtsteiner (yellow card) 51'; Matri (yellow card) 61'; Pirlo (yellow card) 90+3'	Stadium: Stadio Olimpico; Attendance: 54,981; Referee: Gianluca Rocchi

24 February 2013 26	Juventus	3–0	Siena	Turin
15:00 CET (UTC+01:00)	Lichtsteiner 30'; Bonucci (yellow card) 40'; Giovinco 74'; Pogba 89'	Report	Della Rocca (yellow card) 24'	Stadium: Juventus Stadium; Attendance: 38,628; Referee: Domenico Celi

1 March 2013 27	Napoli	1–1	Juventus	Naples
20:45 CET (UTC+01:00)	Inler 43'; Cavani (yellow card) 45+2'; Behrami (yellow card) 54'; Cannavaro (yellow card) 56'; Zúñiga (yellow card) 66'	Report	Chiellini 10'; Vidal (yellow card) 44'; Peluso (yellow card) 87'	Stadium: Stadio San Paolo; Attendance: 58,143; Referee: Daniele Orsato

10 March 2013 28	Juventus	1–0	Catania	Turin
15:00 CET (UTC+01:00)	Giaccherini (yellow card) 89', (goal) 90+1'	Report	Gómez (yellow card) 41'; Biagianti (yellow card) 64'; Spolli (yellow card) 65'	Stadium: Juventus Stadium; Attendance: 38,782; Referee: Antonio Danilo Giannoccaro

16 March 2013 29	Bologna	0–2	Juventus	Bologna
20:45 CET (UTC+01:00)	Antonsson (yellow card) 28'; Pérez (yellow card) 56'; Diamanti (yellow card) 65'	Report	Peluso (yellow card) 22'; Vučinić 61'; Padoin (yellow card) 67'; Vidal (yellow card) 72'; Marchisio 73'	Stadium: Stadio Renato Dall'Ara; Attendance: 35,206; Referee: Mauro Bergonzi

30 March 2013 30	Internazionale	1–2	Juventus	Milan
15:00 CET (UTC+01:00)	Gargano (yellow card) 16'; Pereira (yellow card) 47'; Palacio 54'; Ranocchia (yellow card) 62'; Cambiasso (red card) 90+5'	Report	Quagliarella 3'; Matri 60'; Barzagli (yellow card) 68'; Chiellini (yellow card) 89'; Giovinco (yellow card) 90'	Stadium: San Siro; Attendance: 79,341; Referee: Nicola Rizzoli

6 April 2013 31	Juventus	2–1	Pescara	Turin
18:00 CEST (UTC+02:00)	Bonucci (yellow card) 50'; Vučinić 72' (pen.), 78', (yellow card) 74'	Report	Bjarnason (yellow card) 67'; Rizzo (red card) 72'; Cascione 83'; Modesto (yellow card) 88'	Stadium: Juventus Stadium; Attendance: 38,790; Referee: Sebastiano Peruzzo

15 April 2013 32	Lazio	0–2	Juventus	Rome
20:45 CEST (UTC+02:00)	Cana (yellow card) 7'; Ciani (yellow card) 53'	Report	Vidal 8' (pen.), 28', (yellow card) 14'; Peluso (yellow card) 41'	Stadium: Stadio Olimpico; Attendance: 38,641; Referee: Antonio Danilo Giannoccaro

21 April 2013 33	Juventus	1–0	AC Milan	Turin
20:45 CEST (UTC+02:00)	Vidal 57' (pen.)	Report	Amelia (yellow card) 56'; Zapata (yellow card) 66'; Mexès (yellow card) 71'	Stadium: Juventus Stadium; Attendance: 40,474; Referee: Luca Banti

28 April 2013 34	Torino	0–2	Juventus	Turin
15:00 CEST (UTC+02:00)	Meggiorini (yellow card) 44'; Masiello (yellow card) 57'; Glik (yellow card) 78' (yellow-red card) 90'	Report	Lichtsteiner (yellow card) 44'; Vidal 86'; Marchisio 90+2'	Stadium: Stadio Olimpico di Torino; Attendance: 23,845; Referee: Mauro Bergonzi

5 May 2013 35	Juventus	1–0	Palermo	Turin
15:00 CEST (UTC+02:00)	Barzagli (yellow card) 42'; Vidal 59' (pen.), (yellow card) 60'; Pogba (red card) 83'	Report		Stadium: Juventus Stadium; Attendance: 40,016; Referee: Andrea Romeo

8 May 2013 36	Atalanta	0–1	Juventus	Bergamo
20:45 CEST (UTC+02:00)	Giorgi (yellow card) 51'; Stendardo (yellow card) 58'; Cigarini (yellow card) 75'	Report	Matri 18'; Pirlo (yellow card) 42'	Stadium: Stadio Atleti Azzurri d'Italia; Attendance: 22,099; Referee: Marco Guida

11 May 2013 37	Juventus	1–1	Cagliari	Turin
18:00 CEST (UTC+02:00)	Vučinić 61'; Chiellini (yellow card) 90'	Report	Ibarbo 12'; Murru (yellow card) 33'	Stadium: Juventus Stadium; Attendance: 38,933; Referee: Gianpaolo Calvarese

19 May 2013 38	Sampdoria	3–2	Juventus	Genoa
15:00 CEST (UTC+02:00)	Éder 31' (pen.); De Silvestri 57'; Icardi 75', (yellow card) 76'	Report	Quagliarella 25'; Giaccherini 90+1'	Stadium: Stadio Luigi Ferraris; Attendance: 25,790; Referee: Andrea Gervasoni

=== Coppa Italia ===
Juventus started the Coppa Italia directly in the round of 16, as one of the eight best seeded teams.

8 January 2013 Round of 16	Juventus	1–0	Cagliari	Turin
21:00 CET (UTC+01:00)	Giovinco 57'		Eriksson (yellow card) 17'; Pinilla (yellow card) 34'; Perico (yellow card) 82'; Thiago Ribeiro (yellow card) 90'	Stadium: Juventus Stadium; Attendance: 18,932; Referee: Marco Guida

15 January 2013 Quarter-finals	Juventus	2–1 (a.e.t.)	AC Milan	Turin
20:45 CET (UTC+01:00)	Giovinco 12'; Vidal (yellow card) 65'; Vučinić 95', (yellow card) 113'		El Shaarawy 6'; Mexès (yellow card) 17'; Boateng (yellow card) 30'; Montolivo (yellow card) 100'	Stadium: Juventus Stadium; Attendance: 40,008; Referee: Paolo Mazzoleni

22 January 2013 Semi-finals; First leg	Juventus	1–1	Lazio	Turin
20:45 CET (UTC+01:00)	Peluso 63'		Hernanes (yellow card) 45'; Mauri 86'; Ciani (yellow card) 90'	Stadium: Juventus Stadium; Attendance: 32,277; Referee: Antonio Damato

29 January 2013 Semi-finals; Second leg	Lazio	2–1 (3–2 agg.)	Juventus	Rome
20:45 CET (UTC+01:00)	Konko (yellow card) 29'; González 53'; Floccari 90+3', (yellow card) 90+4'		Giaccherini (yellow card) 4'; Isla (yellow card) 25'; Vidal (yellow card) 51', (goal) 90+1'; Giovinco (yellow card) 81'; Bonucci (yellow card) 85'	Stadium: Stadio Olimpico; Attendance: 50,000; Referee: Luca Banti

=== UEFA Champions League ===
==== Group stage ====
Pos	Team	Pld	W	D	L	GF	GA	GD	Pts	Qualification	JUV	SHK	CHE	NOR
1	(Italy) Juventus	6	3	3	0	12	4	+8	12	Advance to knockout phase	—	1–1	3–0	4–0
2	(Ukraine) Shakhtar Donetsk	6	3	1	2	12	8	+4	10 (Note: Tied on head-to-head points (3) and head-to-head goal difference (0). Head-to-head away goals: Shakhtar Donetsk 2, Chelsea 1.)	Advance to knockout phase	0–1	—	2–1	2–0
3	(England) Chelsea	6	3	1	2	16	10	+6	10	Transfer to Europa League	2–2	3–2	—	6–1
4	(Denmark) Nordsjælland	6	0	1	5	4	22	−18	1		1–1	2–5	0–4	—

Source: Soccerway
Notes:

19 September 2012 1	Chelsea (England)	2–2	(Italy) Juventus	London, England
20:45 CEST (UTC+02:00)	Oscar 31', 33'; Ramires (yellow card) 60'	Report	Vidal 38', (yellow card) 66'; Quagliarella 80'	Stadium: Stamford Bridge; Attendance: 40,918; Referee: Pedro Proença (Portugal)

2 October 2012 2	Juventus (Italy)	1–1	(Ukraine) Shakhtar Donetsk	Turin, Italy
20:45 CEST (UTC+02:00)	Bonucci 25'; Lichtsteiner (yellow card) 43'; Chiellini (yellow card) 71'	Report	Teixeira 23'; Hübschman (yellow card) 76'; Ilsinho (yellow card) 90+1'	Stadium: Juventus Stadium; Attendance: 25,599; Referee: Bas Nijhuis (Netherlands)

23 October 2012 3	Nordsjælland (Denmark)	1–1	(Italy) Juventus	Copenhagen^{1}, Denmark
20:45 CEST (UTC+02:00)	Beckmann 50'; Runje (yellow card) 68'; Mtiliga (yellow card) 83'	Report	Marchisio (yellow card) 37'; Chiellini (yellow card) 49'; Vučinić 81'	Stadium: Parken Stadium; Attendance: 22,404; Referee: Deniz Aytekin (Germany)

7 November 2012 4	Juventus (Italy)	4–0	(Denmark) Nordsjælland	Turin, Italy
20:45 CET (UTC+01:00)	Marchisio 6', (yellow card) 55'; Vidal 23'; Giovinco 37'; Pogba (yellow card) 55'; Quagliarella 75'	Report		Stadium: Juventus Stadium; Attendance: 31,366; Referee: Aleksandar Stavrev (Macedonia)

27 November 2012 5	Juventus (Italy)	3–0	(England) Chelsea	Turin, Italy
20:45 CET (UTC+01:00)	Quagliarella 38'; Bonucci (yellow card) 41'; Vidal 61'; Marchisio (yellow card) 85'; Giovinco 90+1', (yellow card) 90+1'	Report	Ramires (yellow card) 76'	Stadium: Juventus Stadium; Attendance: 39,670; Referee: Cüneyt Çakır (Turkey)

12 December 2012 6	Shakhtar Donetsk (Ukraine)	0–1	(Italy) Juventus	Donetsk, Ukraine
20:45 CET (UTC+01:00)	Stepanenko (yellow card) 20'; Eduardo (yellow card) 30'; Kucher (yellow card) 40'; Mkhitaryan (yellow card) 71'	Report	Vidal (yellow card) 8'; Kucher 56' (o.g.); Chiellini (yellow card) 87'	Stadium: Donbas Arena; Attendance: 50,104; Referee: Jonas Eriksson (Sweden)

Notes

- Note 1: FC Nordsjælland played their home matches at Parken Stadium, Copenhagen instead of their own Farum Park.

==== Knockout phase ====
===== Round of 16 =====
12 February 2013 First leg	Celtic (Scotland)	0–3	(Italy) Juventus	Glasgow, Scotland
20:45 CET (UTC+01:00)	Hooper (yellow card) 37'; Forrest (yellow card) 42'; Brown (yellow card) 76'	Report	Matri 3'; Lichtsteiner (yellow card) 37'; Padoin (yellow card) 76'; Marchisio 77', (yellow card) 89'; Vučinić 83'	Stadium: Celtic Park; Attendance: 57,917; Referee: Alberto Undiano Mallenco (Spain)

6 March 2013 Second leg	Juventus (Italy)	2–0 (5–0 agg.)	(Scotland) Celtic	Turin, Italy
20:45 CET (UTC+01:00)	Peluso (yellow card) 17'; Matri 24'; Quagliarella 65'	Report	Izaguirre (yellow card) 65'	Stadium: Juventus Stadium; Attendance: 39,011; Referee: Fırat Aydınus (Turkey)

===== Quarter-finals =====
2 April 2013 First leg	Bayern Munich (Germany)	2–0	(Italy) Juventus	Munich, Germany
20:45 CEST (UTC+02:00)	Alaba 1'; Mandžukić (yellow card) 44'; Müller 62'; Luiz Gustavo (yellow card) 82'	Report	Chiellini (yellow card) 54'; Vidal (yellow card) 67'; Lichtsteiner (yellow card) 76'	Stadium: Allianz Arena; Attendance: 68,000; Referee: Mark Clattenburg (England)

10 April 2013 Second leg	Juventus (Italy)	0–2 (0–4 agg.)	(Germany) Bayern Munich	Turin, Italy
20:45 CEST (UTC+02:00)	Bonucci (yellow card) 13'	Report	Mandžukić (yellow card) 7', (goal) 64'; Pizarro 90+1'	Stadium: Juventus Stadium; Attendance: 40,823; Referee: Carlos Velasco Carballo (Spain)

== Statistics ==
=== Appearances and goals ===
No.	Pos	Nat	Player	Total		Serie A		Supercoppa Italiana		Coppa Italia		Champions League	
No.	Pos	Nat	Player	Apps	Goals	Apps	Goals	Apps	Goals	Apps	Goals	Apps	Goals
Goalkeepers
1	GK	(Italy) ITA	Gianluigi Buffon	44	0	32	0	1	0	1	0	10	0
30	GK	(Italy) ITA	Marco Storari	8	0	6	0	0	0	2	0	0	0
34	GK	(Brazil) BRA	Rubinho	1	0	0+1	0	0	0	0	0	0	0
Defenders
3	DF	(Italy) ITA	Giorgio Chiellini	32	1	23+1	1	0	0	0	0	8	0
4	DF	(Uruguay) URU	Martín Cáceres	20	1	12+6	1	0	0	0	0	1+1	0
11	DF	(Italy) ITA	Paolo De Ceglie	15	0	12+2	0	0	0	0	0	1	0
13	DF	(Italy) ITA	Federico Peluso	15	0	7+5	0	0	0	0	0	3	0
15	DF	(Italy) ITA	Andrea Barzagli	44	0	34	0	1	0	0	0	9	0
19	DF	(Italy) ITA	Leonardo Bonucci	44	1	33	0	1	0	0	0	10	1
26	DF	(Switzerland) SUI	Stephan Lichtsteiner	35	4	25+3	4	1	0	0	0	6	0
Midfielders
6	MF	(France) FRA	Paul Pogba	37	5	18+9	5	0	0	2	0	3+5	0
7	MF	(Italy) ITA	Simone Pepe	1	0	0+1	0	0	0	0	0	0	0
8	MF	(Italy) ITA	Claudio Marchisio	38	8	28+1	6	1	0	0	0	8	2
20	MF	(Italy) ITA	Simone Padoin	24	0	6+14	0	0+1	0	0	0	2+1	0
21	MF	(Italy) ITA	Andrea Pirlo	43	5	32	5	1	0	0	0	10	0
22	MF	(Ghana) GHA	Kwadwo Asamoah	35	3	22+5	2	1	1	0	0	6+1	0
23	MF	(Chile) CHI	Arturo Vidal	41	14	29+2	10	1	1	0	0	9	3
24	MF	(Italy) ITA	Emanuele Giaccherini	22	3	10+7	3	0+1	0	0	0	0+4	0
33	MF	(Chile) CHI	Mauricio Isla	16	0	8+3	0	0	0	0	0	2+3	0
39	MF	(Italy) ITA	Luca Marrone	11	0	8+2	0	0	0	0	0	1	0
Forwards
9	FW	(Montenegro) MNE	Mirko Vučinić	40	13	24+7	10	0+1	1	0	0	6+2	2
12	FW	(Italy) ITA	Sebastian Giovinco	39	9	23+8	7	1	0	0	0	4+3	2
17	FW	(Denmark) DEN	Nicklas Bendtner	10	0	2+7	0	0	0	0	0	0+1	0
18	FW	(France) FRA	Nicolas Anelka	3	0	0+2	0	0	0	0	0	0+1	0
27	FW	(Italy) ITA	Fabio Quagliarella	34	13	13+14	9	0	0	0	0	4+3	4
32	FW	(Italy) ITA	Alessandro Matri	32	10	10+12	8	1	0	0	0	6+3	2
Players transferred out during the season
2	DF	(Brazil) BRA	Lúcio	4	0	1	0	1	0	0	0	1+1	0

Last updated: 19 May 2013
Source: Competitions

=== Goalscorers ===
Rank	No.	Pos	Nat	Name	Serie A	Supercoppa	Coppa Italia	UEFA CL	Total
1	23	MF	(Chile)	Arturo Vidal	10	1	1	3	15
2	9	FW	(Montenegro)	Mirko Vučinić	10	1	1	2	14
3	27	FW	(Italy)	Fabio Quagliarella	9	0	0	4	13
4	12	FW	(Italy)	Sebastian Giovinco	7	0	2	2	11
5	32	FW	(Italy)	Alessandro Matri	8	0	0	2	10
6	8	MF	(Italy)	Claudio Marchisio	6	0	0	2	8
7	6	MF	(France)	Paul Pogba	5	0	0	0	5
7	21	MF	(Italy)	Andrea Pirlo	5	0	0	0	5
9	26	DF	(Switzerland)	Stephan Lichtsteiner	4	0	0	0	4
10	22	MF	(Ghana)	Kwadwo Asamoah	2	1	0	0	3
10	24	MF	(Italy)	Emanuele Giaccherini	3	0	0	0	3
12	3	DF	(Italy)	Giorgio Chiellini	1	0	0	0	1
12	4	DF	(Uruguay)	Martín Cáceres	1	0	0	0	1
12	13	DF	(Italy)	Federico Peluso	0	0	1	0	1
12	19	DF	(Italy)	Leonardo Bonucci	0	0	0	1	1
Own goal					0	1	0	1	2
Totals					71	4	5	17	97

Last updated: 19 May 2013
