= List of Italian football transfers summer 2012 (August) =

== August 2012 ==
| Date | Name | Moving from | Moving to | Fee |
|---|---|---|---|---|
| 1 August 2012 | Mattia Marchi | Novara | Entella | Co-ownership, Undisclosed |
| 1 August 2012 | Mauro Marotta | Bari (youth) | Fondi | Loan |
| 1 August 2012 | Daniele Ferri | Brescia (co-owned with Cesena) | Forlì | Loan |
| 1 August 2012 | Federico Balzaretti | Palermo | Roma | €4.5M |
| 1 August 2012 | Ivan Piris | (Uruguay) Deportivo Maldonado | Roma | Loan, €700,000 |
| 2 August 2012 | Mattia Desole | Milan (youth) | Monza | Loan |
| 3 August 2012 | (Serbia) Milos Krasic | Juventus | (Turkey) Fenerbahce | €7M |
| 3 August 2012 | Alberto Aquilani | (England) Liverpool | Fiorentina | Undisclosed |
| 3 August 2012 | Borja Valero | (Spain) Villarreal | Fiorentina | Undisclosed |
| 3 August 2012 | Gonzalo | (Spain) Villarreal | Fiorentina | Undisclosed |
| 3 August 2012 | Pietro Balistreri | Ternana | Foligno | Undisclosed |
| 3 August 2012 | Daniel Ciofani | Parma | Perugia | Loan |
| 3 August 2012 | Leonardo Bianchi | Empoli (youth) | Pisa | Loan |
| 3 August 2012 | Andrea Sbraga | Lazio (youth) | Pisa | Co-ownership, Undisclosed |
| 3 August 2012 | Mathieu Moreau | Varese | Venezia | Undisclosed |
| 3 August 2012 | Dario Campagna | Verona | Venezia | Undisclosed |
| 4 August 2012 | Daniele Rosania | Ascoli | Lanciano | Loan |
| 4 August 2012 | Luigi Vitale | Napoli | Ternana | Loan |
| 4 August 2012 | Guillermo Rodriguez (Uruguay) | Cesena | Torino | Free |
| 4 August 2012 | Luca Castiglia | Juventus | Vicenza | Co-ownership, €500 |
| 6 August 2012 | Andrea Rossini | Cesena (& Parma, c) | Bellaria | Loan |
| 6 August 2012 | Kingsley Umunegbu (Nigeria) | Bologna | Boussu (Belgium) | Free |
| 7 August 2012 | Amadou Samb (Senegal) | Chievo | Lumezzane | Loan |
| 7 August 2012 | Stefano Fortunato | Modena | Vicenza | Free |
| 8 August 2012 | Nicola Russo | Taranto | Parma | Free |
| 8 August 2012 | Biagio Meccariello | Andria | Ternana | Undisclosed |
| 9 August 2012 | Luca Tedeschi | Parma | Cremonese | ? |
| 9 August 2012 | David Pizarro | Roma | Fiorentina | €1,000 |
| 9 August 2012 | Leonardo Blanchard | Siena | Frosinone | Loan |
| 9 August 2012 | Manuel Angelilli | Reggina | Latina | Loan |
| 9 August 2012 | Nicola Russo | Parma | Nocerina | Co-ownership, Undisclosed |
| 9 August 2012 | Alex Teodorani | Cesena | Pavia | Loan |
| 9 August 2012 | Andrea Lussardi | Reggina | Pavia | Loan |
| 9 August 2012 | Stefano Botta | Vicenza | Ternana | Free |
| 9 August 2012 | Mattia Sandrini | Vicenza (youth) | Viareggio | Loan |
| 10 August 2012 | Felipe Melo | Juventus | (Turkey) Galatasaray | Loan, €1.75M |
| 10 August 2012 | Michele Murolo | Spezia | Juve Stabia | Free |
| 10 August 2012 | Tibor Čiča | Cesena (youth) | (Croatia) Zagreb | Loan |
| 11 August 2012 | Gabriel Heinze | Roma | (Argentina) Newell's Old Boys | Free |
| 11 August 2012 | Matteo Brighi | Roma | Torino | Loan |
| 11 August 2012 | Dario Bergamelli | AlbinoLeffe | Reggina | Loan |
| 16 August 2012 | Tommaso Arrigoni | Cesena (youth) | Tritium | Loan |
| 16 August 2012 | Francesco Battaglia | Pro Vercelli | Venezia | Free |
| 17 August 2012 | Francesco Anacoura | Parma (youth) | Juventus (remains at Parma, t) | Co-ownership, €750,000 (swap with Chibsah) |
| 17 August 2012 | Raman Chibsah (Ghana) | Juventus (youth) | Parma | Co-ownership, €750,000 (swap with Anacoura) |
| 17 August 2012 | Raman Chibsah (Ghana) | Parma (& Juventus) | Sassuolo | Loan |
| 18 August 2012 | Max Taddei | Fiorentina | Venezia | Co-ownership |
| 19 August 2012 | Niko Bianconi | Juventus (& Vicenza, c) | Poggibonsi | Loan |
| 20 August 2012 | Alessandro Bastrini | Vicenza | Novara | Undisclosed |
| 20 August 2012 | Achille Coser | Novara | Vicenza | Undisclosed |
| 20 August 2012 | Matteo Piccinni | AlbinoLeffe | Padova | Loan (swap with A.Diakité) |
| 20 August 2012 | Yohan Benalouane | Cesena | Parma | Loan |
| 21 August 2012 | (Cameroon) Nestor Djengoue | Chievo | (Croatia) Zagreb | Loan |
| 21 August 2012 | Amedeo Calliari | Chievo | Monza | Co-ownership, Undisclosed |
| 21 August 2012 | Raffaele Bianco | Juventus | Carpi | Loan |
| 21 August 2012 | Matteo Liviero | Juventus | Perugia | Loan |
| 21 August 2012 | Carlos García Ambrosiani (Sweden) | Juventus | Perugia | Loan |
| 22 August 2012 | Adrian Mutu | Cesena | (France) Ajaccio | Free |
| 22 August 2012 | Eugenio Lamanna | Siena (& Genoa, c) | Bari | Loan |
| 22 August 2012 | Fabrizio Di Bella | Livorno | Barletta | Free |
| 22 August 2012 | Alessandro Armenise | Pro Vercelli | Cremonese | Free |
| 22 August 2012 | Alberto Masi | Pro Vercelli | Juventus | Co-ownership resolution, ca. €1 million |
| 22 August 2012 | Elio De Silvestro | Juventus (youth) | Pro Vercelli | Co-ownership, €800,000 |
| 22 August 2012 | James Troisi | (Turkey) Kayserispor | Juventus | Free ( €489,000 other fee) |
| 22 August 2012 | (Ghana) Ahmed Barusso | Roma | Genoa | Free |
| 22 August 2012 | (Ghana) Ephraim O'Neal | Cesena (co-owned with Brescia) | Mantova | Loan |
| 22 August 2012 | Giampaolo Pazzini | Internazionale | Milan | €13M (€7.5M cash + Cassano) |
| 22 August 2012 | Antonio Cassano | Milan | Internazionale | €5.5M (part of Pazzini) |
| 23 August 2012 | (Uruguay) Alvaro Pereira | (Portugal) Porto | Internazionale | €10M + €5M bonus |
| 23 August 2012 | Biagio Pagano | Torino | Modena | Free |
| 23 August 2012 | (Ghana) Ahmed Barusso | Genoa | Novara | Loan |
| 23 August 2012 | Donato Disabato | AlbinoLeffe | Pro Vercelli | Co-ownership, Undisclosed |
| 23 August 2012 | Donato Disabato | Pro Vercelli (& AlbinoLeffe, c) | Prato | Loan |
| 24 August 2012 | Davide Biondini | Genoa | Atalanta | Loan |
| 24 August 2012 | Manolo Gabbiadini | Atalanta | Juventus | Co-ownership, €5.5M |
| 24 August 2012 | James Troisi | Juventus | Atalanta | Co-ownership, €2M |
| 24 August 2012 | Manolo Gabbiadini | Juventus (& Atalanta, c) | Bologna | Loan, Free |
| 24 August 2012 | Adriano Montalto | Ascoli | Latina | Undisclosed |
| 24 August 2012 | (Brazil) Joelson | Pergocrema | Siena | Free |
| 24 August 2012 | Alessandro Camisa | Varese | Vicenza | Free |
| 27 August 2012 | Andrea De Falco | Chievo | Bari | Co-ownership, Undisclosed |
| 27 August 2012 | Nicola Bellomo | Bari | Chievo | Co-ownership, Undisclosed |
| 27 August 2012 | Nicola Bellomo | Chievo | Bari | Loan |
| 28 August 2012 | Attila Filkor | Milan | Bari | Loan |
| 28 August 2012 | Andrea Ferretti | Spezia | Carpi | Undisclosed |
| 28 August 2012 | Samuele Longo | Internazionale (youth) | (Spain) Espanyol | Loan |
| 28 August 2012 | Matteo Gentili | Atalanta | Vicenza | Loan |
| 28 August 2012 | Manuel Giandonato | Juventus | Vicenza | Loan |
| 29 August 2012 | Nicolas Teggi | Bologna | Carpi | Free |
| 29 August 2012 | Massimo Volta | Sampdoria | (Spain) Levante | Loan |
| 30 August 2012 | Marco Costantino | Juventus | Aosta Valley | Loan |
| 30 August 2012 | Lorenzo Burzigotti | Reggina | Barletta | Loan |
| 30 August 2012 | Raffaele Alcibiade | Juventus | Carrarese | Loan |
| 30 August 2012 | Filippo Boniperti | Juventus | Empoli | Loan |
| 30 August 2012 | Giulio Donati | Internazionale | Grosseto | Loan |
| 30 August 2012 | Michele Rigione | Internazionale | Grosseto | Loan |
| 30 August 2012 | Gabriel | Juventus | Pro Vercelli | Loan |
| 31 August 2012 | Pellegrino Albanese | Sassuolo | Arzanese | Undisclosed |
| 31 August 2012 | Tommaso Morosini | AlbinoLeffe | Ascoli | Free |
| 31 August 2012 | Massimo Loviso | Crotone | Ascoli | Loan (swap with Falconieri) |
| 31 August 2012 | Vito Falconieri | Crotone | Ascoli | Loan (swap with Loviso) |
| 31 August 2012 | Leonardo Terigi | Crotone (co-owned with Genoa) | Carpi | Loan |
| 31 August 2012 | Gianluigi Bianco | Sampdoria | Avellino | Free |
| 31 August 2012 | Davide Bariti | Napoli | Avellino | Loan |
| 31 August 2012 | Giordano Maccarone | Catania | Bellaria | ? |
| 31 August 2012 | Nicola Maniero | Padova | Bellaria | Loan |
| 31 August 2012 | (Peru) Joazhiño Arroe | Siena | (Portugal) Braga | Free |
| 31 August 2012 | (Senegal) Ameth Fall | Lecco | Catania | Free |
| 31 August 2012 | (Senegal) Ameth Fall | Catania | Bellaria | ? |
| 31 August 2012 | Santiago Morero | Chievo | Cesena | Loan |
| 31 August 2012 | Gabriele Zerbo | Teramo | Chievo | Undisclosed (co-owned with Palermo) |
| 31 August 2012 | Niccolò Giannetti | Siena | Cittadella | Loan |
| 31 August 2012 | Marcel Büchel | Siena | Cremonese | Loan |
| 31 August 2012 | Guillaume Gigliotti | Novara | Empoli | €1.5 million (swap with Lazzari) |
| 31 August 2012 | Flavio Lazzari | Empoli | Novara | €1.5 million (swap with Gigliotti) |
| 31 August 2012 | (Brazil) Renan Wagner | Varese | Entella | Loan |
| 31 August 2012 | Luca Toni | (United Arab Emirates) Al-Nasr | Fiorentina | Free |
| 31 August 2012 | Andrea Adamo | Palermo | Foligno | Co-ownership resolution, (swap with Vassallo) |
| 31 August 2012 | Francesco Vassallo | Foligno | Palermo | Co-ownership resolution, (swap with Adamo) |
| 31 August 2012 | Francesco Vassallo | Palermo | Foligno | Loan |
| 31 August 2012 | Damiano Ferronetti | Udinese | Genoa | Free |
| 31 August 2012 | Massimo Bonanni | Genoa | Grosseto | Loan |
| 31 August 2012 | Valerio Foglio | AlbinoLeffe | Grosseto | Undisclosed |
| 31 August 2012 | Giuseppe Caccavallo | Crotone | Gubbio | Loan |
| 31 August 2012 | Diego Falcinelli | Sassuolo | Lanciano | Loan |
| 31 August 2012 | Laurent Lanteri | Novara | Siena | €1M (swap with Parravicini) |
| 31 August 2012 | Francesco Parravicini | Siena | Novara | €1M (swap with Lanteri) |
| 31 August 2012 | (France) Laurent Lanteri | Siena | Andria | Loan |
| 31 August 2012 | Emanuele Malerba | Crotone | Andria | Loan |
| 31 August 2012 | Denis Maccan | Brescia | Andria | Loan |
| 31 August 2012 | Luca Anania | Pescara | Padova | Undisclosed |
| 31 August 2012 | Luca Pompilio | Varese | Pavia | Loan |
| 31 August 2012 | Massimo Coda | Bologna | San Marino | Undisclosed |
| 31 August 2012 | Nicola Capellini | Bologna | San Marino | Loan |
| 31 August 2012 | Alessandro Marchi | Bologna | Frosinone | Loan |
| 31 August 2012 | Ivan Pelizzoli | Padova | Pescara | Undisclosed |
| 31 August 2012 | (Slovenia) Dino Martinović | Verona | AlbinoLeffe | Loan |
| 31 August 2012 | Francesco Modesto | Parma | Pescara | Loan |
| 31 August 2012 | Andrea Parodi | Genoa (youth) | Santarcangelo | Loan |
| 31 August 2012 | Thomas Fabbri | Parma (& Cesena, c) | Santarcangelo | Loan |
| 31 August 2012 | Michele Pieri | Palermo | Santarcangelo | Loan |
| 31 August 2012 | (Ghana) Richmond Boakye | Juventus (& Genoa, c) | Sassuolo | Loan |
| 31 August 2012 | Piergiuseppe Maritato | Vicenza | South Tyrol | Loan |
| 31 August 2012 | Alessandro Bassoli | Chievo | South Tyrol | Loan |
| 31 August 2012 | Riccardo Maniero | Pescara (& Juventus) | Ternana | Loan |
| 31 August 2012 | Antonino Ragusa | Pescara (& Genoa) | Ternana | Loan |
| 31 August 2012 | Riccardo Brosco | Pescara (& Parma) | Ternana | Loan |
| 31 August 2012 | Salvatore D'Elia | Juventus | Venezia | Loan |
| 31 August 2012 | Alessandro Berardi | Lazio | Verona | Loan |
| 31 August 2012 | Dominique Malonga | Cesena | Vicenza | Loan |
| 31 August 2012 | Gianvito Plasmati | Nocerina | Vicenza | Undisclosed |
| 31 August 2012 | Luca Di Matteo | Palermo | Vicenza | Undisclosed |

== Out of window transfers ==
| Date | Name | Moving from | Moving to | Fee |
|---|---|---|---|---|
| 3 September 2012 | Jorge Martinez | Juventus | (Romania) Cluj | Loan |
| 3 September 2012 | Saša Bjelanović | Verona | (Romania) Cluj | Undisclosed |
| 6 September 2012 | Reto Ziegler | Juventus | (Russia) Lokomotiv Moscow | Loan |
| 14 September 2012 | Marco Marchionni | Fiorentina | Parma | Free |
| 14 September 2012 | Alessandro Del Piero | Juventus | (Australia) Sydney FC | Free |
| 18 September 2012 | Gianluca Giovannini | Ascoli | Venezia | Free |
| 2 October 2012 | Andrea Cano | Padova | Bassano | Free |
| 25 October 2012 | Ciro Danucci | Juve Stabia | Cuneo | Free |
| 1 November 2012 | Matteo Ciofani | Ascoli | Ternana | Free |
| 2 November 2012 | Mariano Stendardo | Ternana | Treviso | Free |
| 21 December 2012 | Nicolò Consolini | Sassuolo | Cesena | Free |

=== Extended window for Grosseto, Lecce & Vicenza ===
| Date | Name | Moving from | Moving to | Fee |
|---|---|---|---|---|
| 5 September 2012 | Nicola Rigoni | Vicenza | Chievo | €800,000 |
| 5 September 2012 | Nicola Rigoni | Chievo | Vicenza | Loan |
| 7 September 2012 | Davide Gavazzi | Vicenza | Sampdoria | €1.2M |
| 7 September 2012 | Davide Gavazzi | Sampdoria | Vicenza | Loan |
| 7 September 2012 | Marco Padalino | Sampdoria | Vicenza | Free |
| 7 September 2012 | Franco Semioli | Sampdoria | Vicenza | Free |
| 7 September 2012 | Zsolt Laczkó | Sampdoria | Vicenza | Loan |
| 10 September 2012 | Daniele Corvia | Lecce | Brescia | Loan |
| 10 September 2012 | Salvatore Foti | Sampdoria | Lecce | Free |
