= Mohamed Coly =

Senegalese footballer

Personal information
- Full name: Mohamed Abdourammane Coly
- Date of birth: 2 February 1984 (age 42)
- Place of birth: Dakar, Senegal
- Height: 1.86 m (6 ft 1 in)
- Position: Centre back

Youth career
- 1997–2000: Douanes
- 2000–2003: Parma

Senior career*
Years	Team	Apps	(Gls)
2002–2005	Cremonese	1	(0)
2003–2004	→ Calcio (loan)	22	(3)
2005–2007	Castellarano	56	(2)
2007–2008	Crociati Parma	28	(1)
2008–2011	Rodengo Saiano	60	(3)
2010–2011	→ Varese (loan)	0	(0)
2011	→ Taranto (loan)	13	(0)
2011–2012	Taranto	20	(2)
2012–2014	Cittadella	53	(4)
2014–2016	Pro Vercelli	66	(3)
2016–2017	Parma	10	(0)
2017–2019	AC Rezzato	33	(2)
2019–2020	Pergolettese	11	(0)
2020	Franciacorta FC	7	(0)
2021	Atletico Castegnato		
2021–2022	Cellatica 1971		
Total		380	(20)

International career
2008–2009	Senegal	11	(4)
- * Club domestic league appearances and goals

Mohamed Abdourammane Coly (born 2 February 1984) is a Senegalese former footballer who plays as a centre back.

== Career ==
Coly began his career with AS Douanes and joined Parma A.C. in 2000, playing in the Primavera team. In summer 2003 he left club Parma A.C. to sign with the Serie D club U.S.O. Calcio. In the first half of the season 2003–2004 he featured in 22 games before leaving in January 2004 to join Serie C1 team U.S. Cremonese. In his two years there he only earned one cap and in July 2005 he signed in for P.D. Castellarano where he became a key player playing 56 games over two years. For the 2007–2008 season he transferred to Crociati Noceto making 28 appearances in the Serie D.

Subsequently, Coly moved to Lega Pro Seconda Divisione team A.C. Rodengo Saiano who played the playoffs to the Lega Pro Prima Divisione. In August 2010 he was loaned to Varese. On 24 January 2011 he was loaned to Taranto.

In the summer of 2012 he moved to the Citadella. Two years later he switched to Pro Vercelli.

In 2016, he returned to Parma.

On 23 August 2019, he signed with Pergolettese.

== International career ==
Coly was a member of the Senegal national football team and was part of the 2009 African Nations Championship squad.
