= Nazzareno Belfasti =

Italian footballer (born 1993)

Personal information
- Date of birth: 15 July 1993 (age 33)
- Place of birth: Scandiano, Italy
- Height: 1.83 m (6 ft 0 in)
- Position: Left-back

Team information
- Current team: Castellarano

Youth career
- Castellarano
- Modena
- 2010–2012: Juventus

Senior career*
Years	Team	Apps	(Gls)
2012–2013	Juventus	0	(0)
2012–2013	→ Modena (loan)	0	(0)
2013	→ Gubbio (loan)	11	(1)
2013–2014	Pro Vercelli	1	(0)
2014	→ Gubbio (loan)	8	(0)
2014–2018	Juventus	0	(0)
2014–2016	→ FeralpiSalò (loan)	23	(0)
2016–2017	→ Carrarese (loan)	5	(0)
2017–2018	→ Pro Piacenza (loan)	24	(2)
2018–2019	Reggiana	25	(1)
2019–	Castellarano		

International career
2011	Italy U18	1	(0)
2011	Italy U19 (Note: The FIGC wrongly documented the substitution record: 8 out and 5 in (should be 7 in 7 out). Alessandro Orchi should among the substitute in instead of out, as well as the missing of Belfasti who replaced fellow bianconeri teammate Matteo Liviero at half time. Thus FIGC shown Belfasti only had 1 U19 cap.)	2	(0)
- * Club domestic league appearances and goals as of 1 July 2019

Nazzareno Belfasti (born 15 July 1993) is an Italian footballer who plays as a defender for Polisportiva Castellarano Calcio.

== Club career ==
=== Modena ===
Born in Scandiano, and grown up in Castellarano, both in the Province of Reggio-Emilia, Italy, Belfasti started his career at Serie B club Modena F.C. from the nearby province. Belfasti was the member of Primavera (the reserve) squad during the 2009–10 season; he was the member of Allievi under-17 team in 2008–09 season, in which he was the only born 1993 player of the team. Belfasti was promoted directly from Giovanissimi under-15 team in 2008. Belfasti received his first national call-up in December 2009, from Italy U19 team, which the age limit of that season was in fact born 1991. Despite Belfasti did not play, his already drawn attention from major clubs, which Juventus FC signed Belfasti in co-ownership deal in August 2010.

=== Juventus ===
On 12 August 2010 Belfasti was signed by Juventus FC in co-ownership deal, for €250,000 in 3-year contract, (Note: Due to pay in 3 annual installments through central allocation system of FIGC (€90,000 COD; €80,000; €80,000), the discounted value in accounting was €245,000.) the maximum length a player under 18 could sign. Belfasti was the member of Juventus reserve for 2 seasons, which the co-ownership was renewed in June 2011. During his stay he received call-ups from Italy U18 team for training camps as well as a match against the senior national team. He made his U18 debut against Albania on 19 May 2010 and played twice in pre-season friendlies for Italy U19 team against Russia and France in August and September 2011. However, he did not receive any call-up to competitive matches in 2012 UEFA European Under-19 Football Championship qualification.

The co-ownership of Belfasti was renewed again in June 2012 as well as signing a new 4-year contract; he also returned to Modena for 2012–13 Serie B on 2 July. Although the age limit of the reserve had lowered to under-19 in 2012–13 season, Belfasti was remained for the reserve of Modena as overage player. Belfasti was an unused bench for Modena in Serie B and in 2012–13 Coppa Italia in August 2012. On 17 January 2013 Belfasti was signed by Gubbio, where he made 11 starts in the third division.

On 20 June 2013 Juventus bought the remaining 50% registration rights from Modena; keeper Marco Costantino was sold to Modena as part of the deal. Despite the fee was not disclosed by Juventus, the residual contract value of Belfasti had instead from €98,000 on 30 June 2013 to €366,000 on 5 July, or an increase of €268,000, due to the purchase of the remain registration rights, the adjustment in accounting and a few days of amortization.

=== Pro Vercelli ===
On 5 July 2013 Belfasti, along with Giuseppe Ruggiero were joined Pro Vercelli in another co-ownership deal for €470,000 and €260,000 respectively, as part of the return of Elio De Silvestro to Juventus for €760,000.

On 10 January 2014 he returned to Gubbio in a temporary deal.

=== Return to Juventus ===
In August 2014 Juventus bought back Belfasti for €500,000 as well as sold Entonjo Elezaj to opposite direction also for €500,000. Belfasti signed a new 4-year contract.

==== FeralpiSalò (loan) ====
On 6 August 2014 Belfasti was signed by FeralpiSalò in a temporary deal. He injured his head during a match on 1 March 2015.

The loan deal was extended on 5 August 2015.

==== Carrarese (loan) ====
On 26 August 2016 Belfasti and Juventus team-mate Davide Massaro were signed by Lega Pro club Carrarese. Belfasti was assigned number 25 shirt of the first team.

=== Castellarano ===
On 14 August 2019, Belfasti signed with Polisportiva Castellarano Calcio.
