= Cristian Bunino =

Italian footballer (born 1996)

Personal information
- Date of birth: 27 August 1996 (age 30)
- Place of birth: Pinerolo, Italy
- Height: 1.86 m (6 ft 1 in)
- Position: Forward

Team information
- Current team: Torres
- Number: 11

Youth career
- Pro Vercelli

Senior career*
Years	Team	Apps	(Gls)
2013–2015	Pro Vercelli	5	(0)
2015–2018	Juventus	0	(0)
2015–2016	→ Livorno (loan)	14	(1)
2016–2017	→ Siena (loan)	29	(8)
2017–2018	→ Alessandria (loan)	20	(0)
2018–2021	Pescara	13	(1)
2018–2019	→ Juventus U23 (loan)	34	(9)
2019–2020	→ Padova (loan)	15	(2)
2020	→ Viterbese (loan)	11	(0)
2020–2021	→ Teramo (loan)	11	(0)
2021	→ Monopoli (loan)	11	(4)
2021–2025	Pro Vercelli	42	(5)
2022–2023	→ Fermana (loan)	24	(1)
2023	→ Lecco (loan)	17	(2)
2023–2024	→ Brindisi (loan)	28	(5)
2025	→ Casertana (loan)	13	(3)
2025–2026	Cittadella	29	(6)
2026–	Torres	4	(0)

International career
2014–2015	Italy U19	2	(1)
- * Club domestic league appearances and goals as of 26 September 2026

Cristian Bunino (born 27 August 1996) is an Italian footballer who plays as a forward for Serie C Group B club Torres.

== Career ==
=== Pro Vercelli ===
Born in Pinerolo, in the Province of Turin (now part of the Metropolitan City of Turin), Piedmont, Bunino started his career at Piedmontese club Pro Vercelli. He made his Serie B debut in the last round of the 2012–13 Serie B season. Bunino was brought on for substitute Antonio Romano. Vercelli were relegated from Serie B that season, after finishing third from bottom in Group A of the Allievi league.

During the 2013–14 season, his team finished as the winners of Group A in the Berretti under-19 league. However, the team was eliminated by Südtirol in the first round of the play-offs.

Bunino played three more Serie B games for the first team in the first half of the 2014–15 Serie B season.

=== Juventus ===
On 2 February 2015, Turin-based Serie A giants Juventus, signed Bunino for €1.75 million on a 4 1/2-year contract in a straight swap deal involving: Luca Castiglia (for €1.5 million) plus Giuseppe Ruggiero (for €250,000). Bunino was immediately loaned back to Vercelli on a temporary deal for 1 1/2 seasons.

==== Pro Vercelli (loan) ====
Since returning to Pro Vercelli on 2 February 2015, Bunino made just a single appearance during the 2014–15 Serie B campaign. He scored 10 goals for the under-19 team that season, and was Pro Vercelli's top-scorer and ninth best in the Primavera under-19 league.

He played once for Pro Vercelli in the 2015–16 season in the Coppa Italia.

==== Livorno (loan) ====
On 31 August 2015, Bunino and Cristian Pasquato were signed by Serie B club Livorno on temporary deals, rejoining Juventus team-mate Carlo Pinsoglio and Andrea Schiavone. Pro Vercelli also acquired Fausto Rossi from Juventus as a replacement.

==== Siena (loan) ====
On 24 August 2016 Bunino was signed by Siena on a temporary deal.

==== Alessandria (loan) ====
On 8 August 2017 Bunino was signed by another Piedmontese club Alessandria on a temporary deal, with an option to buy. He was assigned number 27 shirt.

=== Pescara ===
On 31 January 2018 Bunino was signed by Pescara in a definitive deal, with Leonardo Mancuso moved to Juventus in the same formula. He was assigned number 11 shirt, which was owned by Francesco Zampano. On 9 August 2019 he joined Padova on loan with an option to purchase. On 10 January 2020 he moved on a new loan to Serie C club Viterbese. On 5 October 2020 he joined Teramo on loan. On 16 January 2021 he moved on a new loan to Monopoli.

=== Return to Pro Vercelli ===
On 30 July 2021, he returned to his boyhood club Pro Vercelli of the Serie C.

=== Loans to Fermana, Lecco and Brindisi ===
On 1 September 2022, Bunino was loaned by Fermana. On 31 January 2023, Bunino moved on a 1.5-year loan to Lecco. On 22 August 2023, Lecco arranged a sub-loan for the 2023–24 season with Brindisi.

== Red card incident ==
When at on loan at Lecco, Bunino was left red-faced and with a red card after being caught urinating on the side of the pitch before coming on for Serie C side Lecco.

He was caught in the act by one of the match officials and was shown a straight red card.
