= Andrés Tello =

Colombian footballer (born 1996)

Personal information
- Full name: Andrés Felipe Tello Muñoz
- Date of birth: 6 September 1996 (age 30)
- Place of birth: Medellín, Colombia
- Height: 1.81 m (5 ft 11 in)
- Position: Central midfielder

Team information
- Current team: Deportes Quindío
- Number: 23

Youth career
- –2013: Envigado

Senior career*
Years	Team	Apps	(Gls)
2013–2015	Envigado	16	(2)
2015–2018	Juventus	0	(0)
2015–2016	→ Cagliari (loan)	24	(2)
2016–2017	→ Empoli (loan)	18	(0)
2017–2018	→ Bari (loan)	33	(1)
2018–2024	Benevento	142	(16)
2024–2025	Catania	7	(0)
2024–2025	→ Salernitana (loan)	18	(1)
2025–2026	América de Cali	0	(0)
2026–	Deportes Quindío		

International career
2013–2014	Colombia U17	2	(0)
2014–2015	Colombia U20	16	(0)
- * Club domestic league appearances and goals as of 16 August 2026

Andrés Felipe Tello Muñoz (born 6 September 1996) is a Colombian professional footballer who plays as a central midfielder for Categoría Primera B club Deportes Quindío.

== Club career ==
=== Envigado ===
Tello began in the lower youth squads of Envigado. Thanks to his good performances, Tello would play with the senior team of Envigado, debuting at age 17 against Independiente Medellín on 10 April 2014. Andrés Tello played 16 times in his debut season and scored twice; thanks to his performance, many European teams wanted him to join their ranks, among them teams like Juventus and Cagliari in Italy.

=== Juventus ===
During the 2015 Winter Transfer window, Serie A giants Juventus took Tello on a season-long loan for 1 million, with an option to buy him at €1.4m. Juventus would then purchase Tello after making 7 appearances with their youth squad. On 8 August 2015, Tello was an unused substitute when Juventus won the Supercoppa Italiana against Lazio.

==== Loan to Cagliari ====
On 19 August 2015, Tello was signed by Serie B side Cagliari on a season-long loan deal. On 11 October he made his Serie B debut for Cagliari as a substitute replacing Diego Farias in the 78th minute of a 3–1 home win over Cesena. On 27 October, Tello played his first match as starter for Cagliari, a 0–0 away draw against Perugia; he was replaced by Marco Fossati in the 78th minute. On 15 November he played his first entire match for Cagliari, a 3–1 away win over Spezia. On 3 December, Tello played in the fourth round of Coppa Italia in a 1–0 away win over Sassuolo. On 9 December he scored his first goal for Cagliari in the 13th minute of a 3–1 away win over Virus Lanciano. On 15 December he played in a 3–0 away defeat against Internazionale in the quarter-finals of Coppa Italia. On 24 December he scored his second goal, as a substitute, in the 84th minute, but he was sent off with a red card in the 86th minute of a 2–0 away win over Salernitana. Tello ended his loan to Cagliari with 26 appearances and 2 goals.

==== Loan to Empoli ====
On 4 July 2016, Tello was signed by Serie A club Empoli on a season-long loan deal. On 13 August he made his debut for Empoli in a 2–0 home win over Vicenza in the third round of Coppa Italia; he played the entire match. On 21 October, Tello made his Serie A debut for Empoli in a 1–0 home defeat against Sampdoria; he was replaced by Rade Krunić in the 46th minute. On 12 September he played his first entire match for Empoli, a 2–1 home win over Crotone. On 29 November he played the fourth round of Coppa Italia in a 2–1 home defeat, after extra time, against Cesena. Tello ended his season-long loan to Empoli with 20 appearances.

==== Loan to Bari ====
On 18 July 2017, Tello was loaned to Serie B side Bari on a season-long loan deal. On 6 August he made his debut for Bari in a 2–1 home win over Parma in the second round of Coppa Italia; he played the entire match. On 12 August he played in the third round in a 2–1 home win over Cremonese. On 28 August, Tello made his Serie B debut for Bari in a 3–0 home win over Cesena; he played the entire match. On 3 September he scored his first goal for Bari in the 42nd minute of a 3–2 away defeat against Empoli. Tello ended his loan to Bari with 36 appearances and 1 goal.

=== Benevento ===
On 13 July 2018, Tello signed a contract until 30 June 2021 with Serie B club Benevento, with an option to rebuy for Juventus. He contributed to Benevento's promotion to 2020–21 Serie A and stayed with the club as it was relegated twice to Serie C.

=== Catania ===
On 30 January 2024, Tello moved to Serie C club Catania.

==== Loan to Salernitana ====
On 17 August 2024, Tello joined Salernitana in Serie B on loan with an option to buy.

=== América de Cali ===
On 28 August 2025, Tello returned to Colombian football as a free agent, signing with América de Cali. He struggled to break into the first team and, after suffering an injury, did not make a competitive appearance for the club before leaving as a free agent at the end of his contract.

=== Deportes Quindío ===
In July 2026, Tello agreed to join Categoría Primera B club Deportes Quindío as a free agent.

== International career ==
Tello made his debut in the 2014 Toulon Tournament, appearing in 3 matches. Tello was recalled to the U20 squad at the 2015 South American Youth Football Championship, playing in all matches and helping Colombia finish as runners-up.

== Style of play ==
Tello is right footed and has a good physical structure that allows him to fight in midfield. He is usually keen to run without the ball and, in the change of pace, he has technical characteristics for which, at home, he is compared to Juan Cuadrado.

== Career statistics ==
As of match played 23 May 2021

Appearances and goals by club, season and competition
Club	Season	League			Cup		Other		Total	
Club	Season	Division	Apps	Goals	Apps	Goals	Apps	Goals	Apps	Goals
Envigado	2014	Categoría Primera A	16	1	3	0	0	0	19	1
Juventus	2015–16	Serie A	0	0	0	0	0	0	0	0
Cagliari (loan)	2015–16	Serie B	24	2	2	0	0	0	26	2
Empoli (loan)	2016–17	Serie A	18	0	2	0	0	0	20	0
Bari (loan)	2017–18	Serie B	33	1	2	0	1	0	36	1
Benevento	2018–19	Serie B	30	1	4	1	0	0	34	2
Benevento	2019–20	Serie B	27	2	1	2	0	0	28	4
Benevento	2020–21	Serie A	17	1	1	0	0	0	18	1
Benevento	Total		74	4	6	3	0	0	80	7
Career total			165	8	15	3	1	0	181	11

== Honours ==
Juventus

- Supercoppa Italiana: 2015
