= Elia Bastianoni =

Italian footballer (born 1991)

Personal information
- Full name: Antonio Elia Bastianoni
- Date of birth: 18 May 1991 (age 35)
- Place of birth: Santa Margherita Ligure, Italy
- Height: 1.83 m (6 ft 0 in)
- Position: Goalkeeper

Team information
- Current team: Santarcangelo
- Number: 22

Senior career*
Years	Team	Apps	(Gls)
2009–2010	Sarzanese	33	(0)
2010–2012	Carpi	19	(0)
2012–2015	Varese	47	(0)
2015	→ Livorno (loan)	0	(0)
2015–2016	Catania	11	(0)
2016–2017	Bassano Virtus	25	(0)
2017–	Santarcangelo	26	(0)
- * Club domestic league appearances and goals as of 25 March 2018

Antonio Elia Bastianoni, known as Elia Bastianoni (born 18 May 1991) is an Italian footballer who plays as a goalkeeper for Santarcangelo.

== Club career ==
He made his Serie C debut for Carpi on 4 September 2011 in a game against Tritium.

On 12 July 2016, he joined Bassano on a free transfer after being released by Catania in the summer.
