= Donato Disabato =

Italian footballer (born 1990)

Personal information
- Date of birth: 17 April 1990 (age 36)
- Place of birth: Varese, Italy
- Height: 1.68 m (5 ft 6 in)
- Position: Midfielder

Team information
- Current team: Chiasso
- Number: 22

Youth career
- –2008: Varese
- 2008–2010: AlbinoLeffe

Senior career*
Years	Team	Apps	(Gls)
2009–2012	AlbinoLeffe	2	(0)
2010–2012	→ Pro Vercelli (loan)	45	(1)
2012–2016	Pro Vercelli	21	(0)
2012–2013	→ Prato (loan)	23	(2)
2014–2015	→ Carrarese (loan)	11	(1)
2016–2019	Pro Patria	73	(9)
2019–2020	Savona	24	(7)
2020–2022	Varese	50	(8)
2023–2024	Paradiso	28	(5)
2024	Collina d'Oro	4	(0)
2025–	Chiasso		
- * Club domestic league appearances and goals as of 21 October 2026

Donato Disabato (born 17 April 1990) is an Italian footballer who plays as a midfielder for Chiasso.

== Club career ==
Born in Varese, Disabato started his career at hometown club Varese. In summer 2008, he signed a youth contract with Serie B side AlbinoLeffe. He wore no.90 shirt and made his Serie B debut on the opening match of 2009–10 Serie B season, which along with Michael Cia, they substituted Marco Cellini and Enrico Geroni respectively in the 75th minute. A minute later AlbinoLeffe's opponent Vicenza scored the equalizing goal and eventually ended in 2–2 draw. He also started the last match of the season, which he was substituted by Tommaso Morosini at the 2nd half, which AlbinoLeffe already lost to Reggina 1–3 and ended the match with the same score.

On 10 August 2010, he was loaned to Lega Pro 2nd Division side Pro Vercelli along with Mattia Corradi. The temporary deal was renewed in 2011–12 Lega Pro Prima Divisione season. After the Piedmontese club promoted to 2012–13 Serie B (co-currently with the relegation and involvement in the betting scandal for AlbinoLeffe), Pro Vercelli signed Disabato in co-ownership deal in August 2012, but arranged another loan deal for Disabato to Prato. In June 2013 the co-ownership was renewed. In June 2014 he was acquired by Pro Vercelli outright.

On 24 November 2009 he played a training match for Italy under-21 Serie B representative team. The U21 Serie B split into blue and white team, which Disabato played as blue team member and substituted Nicola Rigoni in the 60th minute. Blue team lost 0–2 to white team.

On 19 July 2014 he was signed by Carrarese.

On 7 August 2019, he joined Serie D club Savona.

On 30 July 2020, Disabato joined Serie D club Città di Varese.
