= Nicola Russo =

Italian footballer

Personal information
- Date of birth: 8 October 1991 (age 35)
- Place of birth: Taranto, Italy
- Height: 1.75 m (5 ft 9 in)
- Position: Midfielder

Team information
- Current team: Fano

Senior career*
Years	Team	Apps	(Gls)
2009–2012	Taranto	44	(4)
2012	→ Andria (loan)	12	(0)
2012–2013	A.S.G. Nocerina	19	(3)
2013–2014	Parma	0	(0)
2013–2014	→ Gubbio (loan)	3	(0)
2014–2015	Siena	17	(8)
2015	Taranto	14	(1)
2015–2016	RapalloBogliasco	19	(10)
2016–2017	L'Aquila	22	(10)
2017–2018	Nocerina	31	(16)
2018	Pescara	0	(0)
2018	→ Pineto (loan)	0	(0)
2018–2019	Aprilia	22	(5)
2019–2020	Casarano	15	(4)
2020–2021	Vigor Lamezia		
2021	Lamezia Terme	3	(0)
2021-2022	Fano	3	(0)
2022-2025	Massafra		(23)
2025-	Taranto		(0)
- * Club domestic league appearances and goals as of 7 November 2021

Nicola Russo (born 8 October 1991) is an Italian footballer who plays as an attacking midfielder for Taranto.

== Club career ==
Russo left for A.S. Andria BAT in January 2012 in temporary deal.

In summer 2012, Russo was signed by Parma after Taranto folded and the club sent Russo to Nocerina in a co-ownership deal. In June 2013, Russo returned to Parma.

On 3 July 2013, Russo left for Gubbio.

On 11 July 2018, Russo joined Pescara.

On 13 September 2018, he joined Serie D club Aprilia on loan.
