= Allievi =

Allievi is a surname. Notable people with the surname include:

- Lorenzo Allievi (1856–1941), Italian engineer
- Nicholas Allievi (born 1992), Italian footballer
- Sergio Allievi (born 1964), German footballer
- Vittorio Allievi (born 1962), Italian gymnast
- Walter Allievi (born 1960), Italian footballer
