= Francesco Modesto =

Italian football manager (born 1982)

Personal information
- Date of birth: 16 February 1982 (age 44)
- Place of birth: Crotone, Italy
- Height: 1.77 m (5 ft 10 in)
- Positions: Wing-back; winger

Team information
- Current team: Mantova (head coach)

Youth career
- Cosenza

Senior career*
Years	Team	Apps	(Gls)
1999–2001	Cosenza	0	(0)
2001	→ Vibonese (loan)	18	(0)
2001–2002	Venezia	0	(0)
2001–2002	→ Cosenza (loan)	30	(0)
2002–2005	Palermo	13	(0)
2004–2005	→ Ascoli (loan)	60	(3)
2005–2008	Reggina	104	(4)
2008–2011	Genoa	26	(0)
2010	→ Bologna (loan)	13	(0)
2011–2013	Parma	40	(4)
2012–2013	→ Pescara (loan)	19	(0)
2013–2014	Padova	9	(0)
2014–2016	Crotone	24	(1)
2016–2017	Rende	14	(2)

International career
2001–2002	Italy U20	3	(0)

Managerial career
- 2018–2019: Rende
- 2019–2020: Cesena
- 2020–2021: Pro Vercelli
- 2021: Crotone
- 2021–2022: Crotone
- 2022–2023: Vicenza
- 2023–2025: Atalanta Under-23
- 2025–: Mantova
- * Club domestic league appearances and goals

Francesco Modesto (born 16 February 1982) is an Italian football coach and a former player, currently in charge of Serie B club Mantova.

As a player, he was a wing-back or winger on the left flank.

== Playing career ==
=== Cosenza ===
Modesto began his career at fellow Calabrian club Cosenza.

=== Palermo ===
In the 2001–02 season, Modesto was signed by Venezia and loaned back to Cosenza. In August 2002, after Venezia owner Maurizio Zamparini purchased Palermo, he joined the Sicilian side as well.

In January 2004, Modesto was signed by Ascoli in a temporary deal. The loan was renewed in summer 2004.

=== Reggina ===
In summer 2005, Modesto was signed by Reggina in a co-ownership deal for €400,000 fee. In June 2006, Reggina signed him outright for an additional €500,000 fee.

=== Genoa ===
On 2 July 2008, Modesto was signed by Genoa for €5 million fee. On the same day, Genoa also signed Giandomenico Mesto, with Gleison Santos moved to opposite direction.

In January 2010, the Genoa winger was officially sent on loan to Bologna.

=== Parma ===
On 3 January 2011, the full registration rights of Modesto and Genoa-owned 50% registration rights of Raffaele Palladino were exchanged with Parma-owned 50% registration rights of Luca Antonelli and Alberto Paloschi. Genoa also paid Parma €5.85M in cash. Modesto signed a contract until 2014 and became a regular as a left-back in Pasquale Marino's 4–3–3 formation, or as a left winger in his 3–4–1–2 formation.

Modesto signed on loan to Serie A newcomers for the 2012–13 season, Pescara, on the final day of the 2012 summer transfer window.

=== Padova ===
In summer 2013, Modesto was sold to Padova for €250,000, with Bruno Leonardo Vicente moving in the opposite direction for an undisclosed fee. He was successively released from his Padova contract due to bankruptcy.

=== Crotone ===
On 29 August 2014, Modesto was signed by Crotone on a two-year contract.

=== Rende ===
In October 2016, Modesto remained in his native Calabria region for Serie D club Rende.

== Coaching career ==
=== Early years ===
Modesto started his coaching career in 2017 as a youth coach for Rende, and was promoted to head coach for the club's 2018–19 Serie C season, where he guided the small Calabrian club to a historic appearance in the promotion playoffs.

He left Rende in June 2019 to become Cesena's new manager, again in Serie C. Cesena dismissed him on 27 January 2020, after one draw and three losses in four games.

=== Pro Vercelli ===
On 17 August 2020, he was hired by Serie C club Pro Vercelli. He guided Pro Vercelli to third place in the Group A, then competing in the promotion playoffs.

=== Crotone ===
On 9 June 2021, Modesto was announced as the new head coach of his hometown club Crotone in the Serie B league. He was dismissed on 29 October 2021 following a negative start to the 2021–22 Serie B season, leaving Crotone deep in the relegation zone after ten games. He returned to Crotone on 10 December 2021, after the team only gained one point in seven games under his replacement, Pasquale Marino. He was dismissed from his job once again on 29 May 2022, after having failed to save Crotone from relegation to Serie C.

=== Vicenza ===
On 8 November 2022, Modesto was hired as the new head coach of Serie C club Vicenza. On 16 March 2023, he was dismissed, after failing to improve the team results.

=== Atalanta Under-23 ===
On 6 August 2023, Modesto was announced as the inaugural head coach of Atalanta Under-23 after the club was admitted to join Serie C. He departed by the end of the 2024–25 season, after guiding Atalanta Under-23 to two consecutive promotion playoff qualifications.

=== Mantova ===
On 15 December 2025, Modesto was named new head coach of Serie B club Mantova, replacing Davide Possanzini.

== Personal life ==
Francesco Modesto had a son, Michelangelo Modesto, born in 2017.

== Career statistics ==
As of 13 December 2011

Appearances and goals by club, season and competition
Club	League	Season	League		Cup		Europe		Other		Total	
Club	League	Season	Apps	Goals	Apps	Goals	Apps	Goals	Apps	Goals	Apps	Goals
Cosenza	1999–00	Serie B	0	0	2	0	–		0	0	2	0
Cosenza	2000–01	Serie B	0	0	0	0	–		0	0	0	0
Vibonese (loan)	2000–01	Serie D	18	0	0	0	–		0	0	18	0
Cosenza (loan)	2001–02	Serie B	30	0	2	0	–		0	0	32	0
Palermo	2002–03	Serie B	12	0	1	0	–		0	0	13	0
Palermo	2003–04	Serie B	1	0	5	0	–		0	0	6	0
Ascoli (loan)	2003–04	Serie B	19	0	0	0	–		0	0	19	0
Ascoli (loan)	2004–05	Serie B	41	3	3	0	–		2	0	46	3
Reggina	2005–06	Serie A	37	0	0	0	–		0	0	37	0
Reggina	2006–07	Serie A	35	2	3	1	–		0	0	38	3
Reggina	2007–08	Serie A	32	1	2	0	–		0	0	34	1
Genoa	2008–09	Serie A	14	0	2	0	–		0	0	16	0
Genoa	2009–10	Serie A	10	0	1	0	3	0	0	0	14	0
Genoa	2010–11	Serie A	1	0	1	0	–		0	0	2	0
Bologna (loan)	2009–10	Serie A	13	0	0	0	–		0	0	13	0
Parma	2010–11	Serie A	15	1	2	0	–		0	0	17	1
Parma	2011–12	Serie A	25	3	1	0	–		0	0	26	3
Pescara (loan)	2012–13	Serie A	0	0	0	0	–		0	0	0	0
Career total			303	10	24	1	3	0	2	0	332	11

== Managerial statistics ==
As of match played 5 February 2023

Team	Nat	From	To	Record				
Team	Nat	From	To	G	W	D	L	Win %
Rende	(Italy)	6 July 2018	5 June 2019	39	14	7	18	35.90
Cesena	(Italy)	6 June 2019	27 January 2020	27	9	8	10	33.33
Pro Vercelli	(Italy)	17 August 2020	28 May 2021	41	19	12	10	46.34
Crotone	(Italy)	9 June 2021	29 October 2021	11	1	5	5	9.09
Crotone	(Italy)	10 December 2021	30 June 2022	22	3	9	10	13.64
Vicenza	(Italy)	8 November 2022	16 March 2023	17	8	4	5	47.06
Total				157	54	45	58	34.39
