= Alan Arario =

Argentine footballer

Personal information
- Full name: Alan Cristian Arario
- Date of birth: 1 April 1995 (age 31)
- Place of birth: Buenos Aires, Argentina
- Height: 1.73 m (5 ft 8 in)
- Position: Forward

Team information
- Current team: Frattamaggiore

Youth career
- 2008–2012: River Plate
- 2012–2013: Atlético Madrid
- 2013–2014: Roma

Senior career*
Years	Team	Apps	(Gls)
2015	Vélez Sarsfield	1	(0)
2016–2017	Dorados de Sinaloa	9	(0)
2017	Palestino	7	(0)
2018	Vibonese	10	(0)
2018–2019	Nardò	22	(1)
2019	Portici 1906	7	(0)
2020–	Frattamaggiore	–	(–)
- * Club domestic league appearances and goals as of 7 April 2020

Alan Cristian Arario (born 1 April 1995) is an Argentine footballer who plays for Italian Eccellenza club ASD Frattamaggiore Calcio.

== Career ==
=== Club career ===
On December 13th, 2019 it was confirmed that Arario had joined Italian Eccellenza club ASD Frattamaggiore Calcio.
