= Andrea Cano =

Italian footballer and manager (born 1976)

Personal information
- Full name: Andrea Cano
- Date of birth: 18 April 1976 (age 50)
- Place of birth: Rome, Italy
- Height: 1.85 m (6 ft 1 in)
- Position: Goalkeeper

Team information
- Current team: Calcio Padova

Senior career*
Years	Team	Apps	(Gls)
1995–1996	Narnese	8	(0)
1996–1997	Lazio	0	(0)
1997–1998	Narnese	34	(0)
1998–2003	Frosinone	142	(0)
2003–2005	Lanciano	65	(0)
2005–2012	Padova	166	(0)
2012–2013	Bassano Virtus	23	(0)
2013–2014	Delta Porto Tolle	20	(0)

Managerial career
- 2015–2016: Abano (youth goalkeepers)
- 2016–: Padova (youth goalkeepers)
- * Club domestic league appearances and goals as of 8 August 2016 ‡ National team caps and goals as of 8 August 2016

Andrea Cano (born 18 April 1976) is an Italian football manager and former player who played as a goalkeeper. He is currently the director of coaching for youth goalkeepers at Padova Football Academy.

== Playing career ==
Cano's career began with Narnese. He moved to Lazio in Serie A before returning to Narnese. He later played for Frosinone and Lanciano. From 2005 he played for Calcio Padova, renewing his contract several times before leaving the club in 2012.

In October 2012 he moved to Bassano Virtus in the Lega Pro Seconda Divisione and in November 2013 joined Delta Porto Tolle in the same division. At the end of the 2013–14 season he retired as a player.

== Coaching career ==
In the summer of 2015 Cano became the youth goalkeepers coach for Abano in Serie D. In July 2016 he moved to coach at Calcio Padova.
