= Giuseppe Ruggiero =

Italian footballer

Personal information
- Date of birth: 28 October 1993 (age 33)
- Place of birth: Sant'Agata di Puglia, Italy
- Height: 1.80 m (5 ft 11 in)
- Position: Midfielder

Team information
- Current team: Real Casalnuovo

Youth career
- Juventus

Senior career*
Years	Team	Apps	(Gls)
2012–2013	Juventus	0	(0)
2013–2016	Pro Vercelli	14	(0)
2014–2015	→ Ascoli (loan)	2	(0)
2015	→ ND Gorica (loan)	10	(1)
2015–2016	→ Cuneo (loan)	33	(3)
2016–2017	Savona	17	(2)
2017–2018	Argentina Arma	25	(1)
2018–2019	Nocerina	28	(11)
2019	Giugliano	14	(1)
2019–2020	Portici	9	(2)
2020	Rotonda	4	(0)
2020–2021	Puteolana	23	(1)
2021–2023	Nola	62	(4)
2023–	Real Casalnuovo	1	(0)

International career
2012	Italy U19	1	(0)
- * Club domestic league appearances and goals as of 10 September 2023

Giuseppe Ruggiero (born 28 October 1993) is an Italian footballer who plays as a midfielder for Serie D club Real Casalnuovo.

== Career ==
=== Juventus ===
Ruggiero was a player of Juventus FC's reserve team from 2010 to 2012, and as an overage player in 2012–13 season. He received call-ups from the first team in 2011, for pre-season friendlies against Cuneo and Real Betis in August as well as the opening match of Juventus Stadium, against Notts County. Ruggiero was a player for bianconeri's Allievi team in 2009–10 season.

=== Pro Vercelli ===
On 5 July 2013 Ruggiero and Nazzareno Belfasti were signed by Pro Vercelli for €470,000 and €260,000 respectively in co-ownership deals, as part of the bought back of Elio De Silvestro €760,000. Ruggiero won promotion back to Serie B with the Piedmontese side in 2014. On 19 June 2014, the co-ownerships were renewed. However, in August 2014, Belfasti was bought back by Juve.

In July 2014, Ruggiero returned to Lega Pro for Ascoli in a temporary deal. On 5 February 2015, his transfer to Slovenian club ND Gorica was confirmed. On 2 February 2015 Pro Vercelli also acquired Ruggiero (for €250,000) and Luca Castiglia outright (for €1.5 million), and sold Cristian Bunino to Turin (for €1.75 million).

On 24 July 2015 he was signed by Cuneo.

In August 2023, he signed with Real Casalnuovo.
