= Marco Costantino =

Italian football goalkeeper (born 1991)

Personal information
- Date of birth: 8 May 1991 (age 35)
- Place of birth: Cento, Italy
- Height: 1.92 m (6 ft 4 in)
- Position: Goalkeeper

Youth career
- 2004–2010: SPAL
- 2009–2010: → Sampdoria (loan)
- 2010–2011: Juventus

Senior career*
Years	Team	Apps	(Gls)
2010–2013	Juventus	0	(0)
2011–2012	→ Latina (loan)	3	(0)
2012	→ SPAL (loan)	1	(0)
2012–2013	→ VdA Saint-Christophe (loan)	8	(0)
2013–2017	Modena	2	(0)
2014–2015	→ Sassari Torres (loan)	2	(0)
- * Club domestic league appearances and goals as of 30 July 2017

Marco Costantino (born 8 May 1991) is an Italian former football goalkeeper.

== Club career ==
=== Youth career ===
Costantino began his youth career with SPAL 1907, and remained with the central Italian club's junior squad until July 2009, when he was transferred to Serie A side U.C. Sampdoria's youth side.

=== Juventus ===
Following the appointment of the new board and staff at Juventus at the conclusion of the 2009–10 season, Costantino was one of many new faces brought to Turin. He was signed for about €170,000 in five-year contract. Ex-Sampdoria head coach Luigi Delneri and sports director Giuseppe Marotta were appointed as the same positions in Juve and played a role in bringing the youngster to Turin. He joined Juventus in order to strengthen the Primavera team but was immediately promoted to the senior squad as their no.1 Italian international Gianluigi Buffon was injured for several months. He was registered in Juventus's 24-men UEFA Europa League first team squad (list A) as the fourth keeper, behind Gianluigi Buffon, former Sampdoria teammate, Marco Storari and Austrian international, Alex Manninger. Juventus also registered young Primavera player Marco Bonassi in B list in qualifying and playoffs phase, but soon left the club on loan. Costantino played most of the games for the "Primavera Squadra".

=== Loan Deals ===
In July 2011, Marco Costantino was loaned to Latina. He made his debut in 2011–12 Coppa Italia, however he spent most of the time as the backup of Fernando Martinuzzi. In January 2012, he returned to Juventus and was loaned to his former club, SPAL 1907, where he served as a back-up for Luca Capecchi. He again returned to Juventus on 30 June 2012, before being loaned out once more to Lega Pro Seconda Divisione outfit, VdA Saint-Christophe on 30 August 2012. With the fourth division squad, Costantino made 8 league appearances, serving much of the season as a back-up to Pierluigi Frattali.

=== Modena ===
On 20 June 2013, Costantino officially completed a permanent transfer to Serie B side for around €244,000 (residual contract value of €92,000 plus profit €152,000), Modena F.C. after a deal was reached with Juventus. The transfer was part of the negotiation that took Nazzareno Belfasti back to Juventus on a permanent basis following his co-ownership deal.

== International career ==
Costantino received some call-ups to Italian youth teams but never made a debut.
