= Laurențiu Brănescu =

Romanian footballer

Personal information
- Full name: Laurențiu Constantin Brănescu
- Date of birth: 30 March 1994 (age 32)
- Place of birth: Râmnicu Vâlcea, Romania
- Height: 1.94 m (6 ft 4 in)
- Position: Goalkeeper

Team information
- Current team: 1599 Șelimbăr
- Number: 1

Youth career
- 2001–2004: FC Teleșpan 97
- 2004–2009: CSM Râmnicu Vâlcea
- 2011–2012: Juventus

Senior career*
Years	Team	Apps	(Gls)
2009–2010	CSM Râmnicu Vâlcea	6	(0)
2012–2020	Juventus	0	(0)
2013–2014	→ Juve Stabia (loan)	4	(0)
2014–2015	→ Virtus Lanciano (loan)	0	(0)
2015	→ Haladás (loan)	2	(0)
2015–2016	→ Omonia (loan)	2	(0)
2016–2018	→ Dinamo București (loan)	20	(0)
2018–2019	→ Gorica (loan)	0	(0)
2019	→ Žalgiris (loan)	3	(0)
2019–2020	→ Kilmarnock (loan)	26	(0)
2021	Politehnica Iași	18	(0)
2021–2022	Farul Constanța	0	(0)
2022	Universitatea Cluj	3	(0)
2023	Atromitos	1	(0)
2024–2025	Ceahlăul Piatra Neamț	23	(0)
2025–2026	Hibernians	18	(0)
2026–	1599 Șelimbăr	2	(0)

International career
2007–2008	Romania U15	10	(0)
2009–2011	Romania U17	12	(0)
2011–2012	Romania U19	3	(0)
2013–2016	Romania U21	12	(0)
- * Club domestic league appearances and goals as of 10 October 2026

Laurențiu Constantin Brănescu (born 30 March 1994) is a Romanian professional footballer who plays as a goalkeeper for Liga II club 1599 Șelimbăr.

== Club career ==
=== Râmnicu Vâlcea ===
Born in Râmnicu Vâlcea, Romania, Brănescu began his career with the youth academy of local side CSM Râmnicu Vâlcea in 2000. He remained within the club's youth sector until January 2011, when he caught the attention of Serie A side, Juventus Football Club. Brănescu originally was scouted by the Turin-based club during the summer of 2010, but did not officially complete his transfer to Italy until 24 January 2011. Prior to his transfer, the then 16-year-old made his debut for his hometown club on 28 August 2010 in a 2–0 away loss to Turnu Severin. He made two additional appearances for the club in the Romanian Liga II, which included a clean-sheet for the player on 20 November 2010 in a 1–0 win over ALRO Slatina.

=== Juventus ===
On 24 January 2011, Brănescu officially transferred from Râmnicu Vâlcea to Juventus Upon joining the Turin-based club, Brănescu was instantaneously inserted into the club's youth sector, where he quickly established himself as the club's first choice goalkeeper. Along with his regularity in the youth academy, Brănescu also served as Juventus' fourth choice goalkeeper for the 2012–13 Serie A campaign, behind Gianluigi Buffon, Marco Storari and Rubinho, earning six first team call-ups during league play, and also was a part of the club's 2012–13 UEFA Champions League roster.

==== Juve Stabia loan ====
On 2 July 2013, it was confirmed that Juventus had officially loaned the young goalkeeper to Serie B outfit Juve Stabia on a season-long loan deal with an option to prolong his tenure with the club for a further season. He made his professional debut for Juve Stabia on 11 August 2013 in the second round of the Coppa Italia against A.S. Gubbio 1910.

==== Virtus Lanciano loan ====
On 30 January 2014, Brănescu was swapped with Mame Baba Thiam of Virtus Lanciano in co-ownership deals (plus €250,000 cash to Juventus). On 19 June 2014, the deals were renewed.

On 20 January 2015, Brănescu returned to Juventus for €1.2 million (a player swap, with De Silvestro moving in the opposite direction for €1.2 million);

==== Other loans ====
Brănescu was immediately left for Szombathelyi Haladás on a temporary transfer. On 27 June 2015, Juventus accepted a loan offer for him from the Cypriot club Omonia.

In 2018 mid-year transfer window, Brănescu left for Croatian club HNK Gorica on a temporary deal. On 12 February 2019, he joined Lithuanian club Žalgiris on loan.

On 8 July 2019, he joined Scottish Premiership club Kilmarnock on a season long loan. He said he had learned a lot from Juventus goalkeeper Gianluigi Buffon and wanted to use that to become Kilmarnock's first-choice goalkeeper.

Brănescu was released by Juventus in the summer of 2020.

== International career ==
Brănescu has represented Romania at the U-17, U19, and U-21 levels for a total of 27 caps.

== Honours ==
Juventus

- Serie A: 2012–13
- Supercoppa Italiana: 2012

Omonia

- Cypriot Cup runner-up: 2015–16

Dinamo București

- Cupa Ligii: 2016–17

Žalgiris

- Lithuanian Supercup runner-up: 2019

Hibernians

- Maltese Super Cup: 2025
