= PD Castellarano =

Italian football club

Castellarano
- Full name: Polisportiva Castellarano Calcio
- Founded: 2000
- Ground: Stadio G. Ferrarini, Castellarano, Italy
- Capacity: 1,700
- Chairman: Romano Merlatti
- Manager: Leopoldo Matta
- League: Eccellenza Emilia–Romagna
- 2011–12: Eccellenza Emilia–Romagna
Home colours	Away colours

Polisportiva Castellarano Calcio is an Italian association football club located in Castellarano, Emilia-Romagna. It currently plays in Eccellenza Emilia–Romagna.

== History ==
The club was founded in 2000.

The highest category in which it has played is Serie D.

== Colors and badge ==
Its colors are red and blue.

== Honours ==
- Regional Coppa Italia Emilia–Romagna:
  - Winners (1): 2011–12
