= Alberto Masi =

Italian footballer (born 1992)

Personal information
- Date of birth: 2 September 1992 (age 34)
- Place of birth: Genoa, Italy
- Height: 1.88 m (6 ft 2 in)
- Position: Centre-back

Team information
- Current team: Pro Patria
- Number: 26

Youth career
- Sampdoria

Senior career*
Years	Team	Apps	(Gls)
2009–2011	Sampdoria	0	(0)
2009–2010	→ Lavagnese (loan)	20	(0)
2011–2012	Pro Vercelli	24	(1)
2012–2013	Juventus	0	(0)
2012–2013	→ Pro Vercelli (loan)	14	(1)
2013	→ Ternana (loan)	10	(0)
2013–2017	Ternana	72	(5)
2017–2018	Bari	0	(0)
2017–2018	→ Spezia (loan)	6	(1)
2018–2019	Pisa	17	(0)
2019–2023	Pro Vercelli	83	(2)
2023	Triestina	14	(2)
2023–2025	Atalanta U23	11	(0)
2025–	Pro Patria	20	(0)

International career
2012–2013	Italy U20	2	(0)
2012–2013	Italy U21	3	(0)
- * Club domestic league appearances and goals as of 30 April 2026

Alberto Masi (born 2 September 1992) is an Italian footballer who plays as a centre-back for Serie D club Pro Patria.

== Club career ==
=== Sampdoria ===
Born in Genoa, Liguria region, Masi started his career at Serie A club U.C. Sampdoria. He was the member of U17 youth team during the 2008–09 season. That season, he was booked 6 times in the league and 3 times in the playoffs.

Masi only played a single season with Sampdoria's U20 squad, despite being eligible to play 3 seasons, from age 18 to 20 (2009 to 2012). He also spent the 2009–10 campaign, on loan at Lavagnese in the Serie D (also within the Genoa province) before returning to the port city. Masi played 15 out of possible 26 matches of the 20 team league for Samp in 2010–11 season, missing one match due to suspension, after being booked 5 times that season. Sampdoria finished as the 8th of Group A that season, slipping from 1st of Group A (losing semi-finalists in playoffs) last season.

=== Pro Vercelli ===
On 8 July 2011 Masi left Sampdoria once again for F.C. Pro Vercelli along with teammate Tommaso Cancellotti. Sampdoria gifted the Piedmont club half of the registration rights for a fee of €500 each, in exchange for a chance to develop the players.

Masi became one of the protagonist of the club promotion as playoffs winner of 2011–12 Lega Pro Prima Divisione. However Masi himself also suspended two times, both due to being sent off (one direct sent off, one due to second caution). He was also booked 4 times, including the 2 aforementioned. Moreover, Masi also booked once in the playoffs.

At the end of season both clubs failed to agree a price for Masi before the deadline, thus both clubs submitted a bid in a sealed envelope to the Lega Serie B in order to buy the shares from opposite side. On 23 June 2012 Lega Serie B announced that Pro Vercelli had bidded a higher price to buy Masi outright from Sampdoria, for €421,000 fee.

=== Juventus ===
After winning the bid for the young defender, Pro Vercelli decided to sell Masi immediately. On 5 July 2012, Masi joined Serie A and Piedmont club Juventus FC in another co-ownership deal on a 4-year contract. On 22 August 2012 Juventus bought the player outright, buying the remaining half of his registration rights from Pro Vercelli by selling the co-ownership of Elio De Silvestro plus and undisclosed cash sum. Juventus later revealed in its annual financial report that Masi had cost the club €2 million and 50% of De Silvestro's contract which was valued at €800,000; thus, the fee involved €1.2 million cash.

On 31 August 2012, Masi returned to Pro Vercelli from Juventus on a temporary loan deal along with Gabriel Appelt Pires. After spending the first half of the 2012–13 Serie B season in the Pro Vercelli starting line-up, making 14 league appearances, Masi was surprisingly called back to Turin in order to be re-located during the 2013 January transfer window. He was sent out on loan to fellow Serie B outfit, Ternana Calcio until 30 June 2013, with an option to purchase.

=== Ternana ===
On 9 July 2013, Juventus announced the sale of Alberto Masi to Ternana on a co-ownership deal worth €2 million. (€1.35 million plus half of the registration rights of Simone Russini) Masi's registration rights will therefore remain with the Umbria club for the 2013–14 Serie B campaign. In June 2014 the co-ownership deals of Masi and Russini were renewed.

On 2 February 2015 Ternana signed Masi outright for €1.5 million, as part of the deal that Juventus signed Alberto Brignoli from Ternana for €1.75 million on the same day. In June 2015 Russini also returned to Ternana for €150,000 fee, matching the €1.5 million price tag of 50% registration rights of Masi.

=== Bari ===
On 11 July 2017 Masi joined Bari on a one-year deal. However, on 31 August, he joined fellow Serie B club Spezia on a temporary deal, with an option to buy the player's contract.

=== Return to Pro Vercelli ===
On 23 August 2019, he signed with Pro Vercelli.

=== Triestina ===
On 28 January 2023, Masi joined Triestina on a 1.5-year contract.

== International career ==
On 15 August 2012, he made his debut with the Italy U-21 team in a friendly match against Netherlands.

Masi was also selected to play for the Italy Lega Pro representative teams (U20/U21) in 2011–12 season (along with teammate Angelo Bencivenga), against Palestine Olympic (no lineup available, for U21 born 1990 age group), England C (for U20 born 1991 age group) and San Marino U21. (for U20 born 1992 age group) He was also selected to a youth tournament in Dubai and winning Al-Shabab in the final.
