= Elio De Silvestro =

Italian footballer (born 1993)

Personal information
- Date of birth: 10 March 1993 (age 33)
- Place of birth: Formia, Italy
- Height: 1.75 m (5 ft 9 in)
- Position: Second striker

Team information
- Current team: Valmontone
- Number: 10

Youth career
- 2001–2012: Juventus

Senior career*
Years	Team	Apps	(Gls)
2012–2013	Pro Vercelli	19	(1)
2013–2015	Juventus	0	(0)
2013–2014	→ Reggiana (loan)	27	(5)
2014–2015	→ Carpi (loan)	1	(0)
2015–2016	Lanciano	9	(0)
2016	→ Pavia (loan)	8	(0)
2016–2017	Ancona	19	(2)
2017	Siracusa	16	(5)
2017–2021	Gubbio	85	(9)
2018	→ Siracusa (loan)	12	(1)
2021–2022	Grosseto	12	(0)
2022	→ Juve Stabia (loan)	6	(0)
2022–2023	United Riccione	17	(2)
2023–2025	Avezzano	44	(11)
2025	Fermana	14	(2)
2025–2026	Giulianova	16	(4)
2026–	Valmontone	1	(0)

International career
2008–2009	Italy U-16	7	(1)
2009–2010	Italy U-17	3	(0)
2010–2011	Italy U-18	5	(1)
2011–2012	Italy U-19	12	(2)
2012	Italy U-20	4	(0)
- * Club domestic league appearances and goals as of 1 March 2026

Elio De Silvestro (born 10 March 1993) is an Italian footballer who plays as a support striker for Serie D club Valmontone.

== Club career ==
=== Juventus ===
Born in Formia, Italy, De Silvestro joined the Juventus FC Youth Sector in 2001, at the age of 7, progressing through the club's youth academy through to the Primavera (Under-20) roster that he was promoted to in 2010. A key part of the 2011–12 Primavera squad for Juventus, De Silvestro was promoted to the senior squad prior to the 2012–13 Serie A campaign. He took part in Juventus' pre-season camp and also played in several pre-season matches, including the 2011 American tour.

=== Pro Vercelli ===
On 22 August 2012, De Silvestro was sold in a co-ownership deal to Pro Vercelli for €800,000 as part of the deal that saw Alberto Masi transfer outright to Juventus. De Silvestro was player of Pro Vercelli for the 2012–13 Serie B season. With the Serie B outfit, De Silvestro made his professional debut on 25 August 2012, coming on as an 84th-minute substitute in a 1–0 home victory over Ternana during league play. He went on to make 19 league appearances for the club, scoring his first career goal on 9 September 2012 in a 1–2 home loss to Livorno.

On 5 July 2013, Juventus completed a triple-deal with Pro Vercelli that saw De Silvestro return to Turin permanently for €760,000 while the recently relegated Lega Pro Prima Divisione outfit secured the co-ownership signings of Giuseppe Ruggiero and Nazzareno Belfasti for €470,000 and €260,000 respectively.

=== Reggiana (loan) ===
On 2 September 2013, De Silvestro was officially sold on a temporary basis to Reggiana.

=== Carpi (loan) ===
De Silvestro joined Serie B side Carpi on loan for the 2014–15 season.

=== Lanciano ===
On 22 January 2015 De Silvestro moved to Lanciano for €1.2 million, with Laurențiu Brănescu returned to Juventus for the same fee. De Silvestro wore no.15 which left vacated by Pasquale De Vita. In January 2016 De Silvestro was loaned to Pavia.

=== Ancona ===
In July 2016 De Silvestro was signed by Ancona. He wore number 11 shirt.

=== Juve Stabia ===
On 31 January 2022, De Silvestro joined Juve Stabia on loan.

== International career ==
De Silvestro has represented his country at the Italy U-16, Italy U-17, Italy U-18, Italy U-19, Italy U-20, and Italy U-21 international levels. In all, he has earned 31 international caps, scoring 4 goals.
