= List of Italian football transfers summer 2014 =

This is a list of Italian football transfers featuring at least one Serie A or Serie B club which were completed after the end of the 2013–14 season and before the end of the 2013 summer transfer window. The window formally opened on 1 July and closed on 1 September 2014 (two months), but Lega Serie A and Lega Serie B accepted to document any transfer before that day; however, those players would only able to play for their new club at the start of the 2014–15 season. Free agents could join any club at any time.

This list does not include co-ownership resolutions, which had to be renewed or resolved no later than 20 June 2014.

== July to September 2014 ==
Legend

- Those clubs in Italic indicated that the player already left on loan in previous season or 2014 new signing that immediately left the club

Date	Name	Moving from	Moving to	Fee
12 February 2014 (Note: The player contract will be effective on 1 July 2014)	Artur Ioniță	Aarau (Switzerland)	Verona	Free
18 February 2014	Boško Janković	Genoa	Verona	Undisclosed (Note: The player already played for his new club in 2013–14 season, the deal turned from temporary to definitive.)
5 March 2014	Nemanja Vidić	Manchester United (England)	Inter	Free
31 March 2014	Albert Riera	Watford (England)	Udinese	Free
24 April 2014 (Note: The player contract will be effective on 1 August 2014)	Pontus Jansson	Malmö (Sweden)	Torino	Free
8 May 2014	Paolo Valagussa	Monza	Virtus Entella	Undisclosed
9 May 2014	Sławomir Peszko	Parma	1. FC Köln (Germany)	Undisclosed
11 May 2014	Nabil Jaadi	Anderlecht (Belgium)	Udinese Calcio	Undisclosed
15 May 2014	Marko Livaja	Atalanta (& Inter, c)	Rubin Kazan (Russia)	Undisclosed
19 May 2014	Kalidou Koulibaly	Genk (Belgium)	Napoli	Undisclosed
22 May 2014	Michael Agazzi	Chievo	Milan	Free
23 May 2014	Pedro Miguel Costa Ferreira	Messina	Virtus Entella	Undisclosed
22 May 2014	Juan Iturbe	Porto (Portugal)	Verona	€15M
27 May 2014	Nikola Maksimović	Apollon Limassol (Cyprus)	Torino	Undisclosed
29 May 2014	Maicosuel	Udinese	Atlético Mineiro (Brazil)	Undisclosed
29 May 2014	Davide Biondini	Genoa	Sassuolo	Undisclosed
29 May 2014	Antonio Floro Flores	Genoa	Sassuolo	Undisclosed
30 May 2014	Matías Rodríguez	Sampdoria	Grêmio (Brazil)	Loan
2 June 2014	Ciro Immobile	Torino	Borussia Dortmund (Germany)	Undisclosed
5 June 2014	Seydou Keita	Valencia (Spain)	Roma	Free
6 June 2014	Alex	Paris Saint-Germain (France)	Milan	Free
6 June 2014	Gabriel Torje	Udinese	Konyaspor (Turkey)	Loan
7 June 2014	Josef Martínez	Young Boys (Switzerland)	Torino	Undisclosed
9 June 2014	Ciprian Tătărușanu	Steaua București (Romania)	Fiorentina	Free
11 June 2014	Tin Jedvaj	Roma	Bayer Leverkusen (Germany)	2-year loan
12 June 2014	Paolo Regoli	Pontedera	Avellino	Loan
12 June 2014	Andrea Bavena	Mantova	Avellino	Undisclosed
12 June 2014	Giorgi Chanturia	Cluj (Romania)	Verona	Undisclosed
13 June 2014	Gianluca Litteri	Ternana	Virtus Entella	Free
13 June 2014	Michał Chrapek	Wisła Kraków (Poland)	Catania	Undisclosed
13 June 2014	Jérémy Ménez	Paris Saint-Germain (France)	Milan	Free
14 June 2014	Vítor Saba	Brescia	Western Sydney Wanderers (Australia)	Undisclosed
16 June 2014	Cristian Molinaro	Parma	Torino	Free
17 June 2014	Nicola Belmonte	Siena	Udinese	Free
17 June 2014	Jean-Alain Fanchone	Udinese	Petrolul Ploiești (Romania)	Undisclosed
18 June 2014	Luca Zanon	Venezia	Fiorentina	Undisclosed
18 June 2014	Mirko Antenucci	Catania	Ternana	Co-ownership
18 June 2014	Boukary Dramé	Chievo	Atalanta	Free
18 June 2014	Pierluigi Frattali	Cosenza	Avellino	Undisclosed
18 June 2014	Demiro Pozzebon	Olbia	Avellino	Undisclosed
18 June 2014	Giuseppe Zampano	Martina	Crotone	Undisclosed
18 June 2014	Aniello Salzano	Tuttocuoio	Crotone	Undisclosed
18 June 2014	Andrea Belotti	AlbinoLeffe	Palermo	Co-ownership
18 June 2014	Jacopo Dezi	Napoli	Crotone	Co-ownership
18 June 2014	Filippo Scaglia	Torino	Cittadella	Co-ownership
18 June 2014	Diego Milito	Inter	Racing Club (Argentina)	Free
19 June 2014	Pietro Visconti	Cremonese	Avellino	Undisclosed
19 June 2014	Steve Leo Beleck	Udinese	Fiorentina	Undisclosed
20 June 2014	Leandro Greco	Livorno	Genoa	Undisclosed
20 June 2014	Gennaro Troianiello	Palermo	Bologna	Loan
20 June 2014	Bakaye Traoré	Milan	Bursaspor (Turkey)	Free
20 June 2014	Ervin Zukanović	Gent (Belgium)	Chievo	Loan
20 June 2014	Cosimo Chiricò	Parma	Ascoli	Loan
24 June 2014	Cyril Théréau	Chievo	Udinese	Undisclosed
24 June 2014	Umberto Eusepi	Varese	Benevento	Undisclosed
25 June 2014	Erick Cabalceta	Catania	Cartaginés (Costa Rica)	Loan
26 June 2014	Matěj Vydra	Udinese	Watford (England)	Loan
26 June 2014	Mislav Oršić	Spezia	Rijeka (Croatia)	Undisclosed
26 June 2014	Alessandro Sgrigna	Verona	Cittadella	Undisclosed
26 June 2014	Tallo Gadji	Roma	Bastia (France)	Loan
26 June 2014	Richard Lásik	Brescia	Slovan Bratislava (Slovakia)	Undisclosed
27 June 2014	Andrea Arrighini	Pontedera	Avellino	Undisclosed
27 June 2014	Eduardo Carvalho	Genoa	Dinamo Zagreb (Croatia)	Free
27 June 2014	Daniele Capelli	Atalanta	Cesena	Loan
27 June 2014	Guido Marilungo	Atalanta	Cesena	Loan
27 June 2014	Luigi Giorgi	Atalanta	Cesena	Loan
27 June 2014	Riccardo Cazzola	Atalanta	Cesena	Loan
27 June 2014	Kyle Lafferty	Palermo	Norwich (England)	Undisclosed
27 June 2014	Emanuele Fonte	Cesena	Brescia	€2.4 million (swap with Romano)
27 June 2014	Antonio Romano	Brescia	Cesena	€2.4 million (swap with Fonte)
27 June 2014	Felice Di Cecco	Brescia	Cesena	€1.6 million (swap with Galassi)
27 June 2014	Adedoyin Sanni	Brescia	Pescara	€800,000 (swap with Camilli)
27 June 2014	Gianmarco Gerevini	Brescia	Bologna	€800,000 (swap with Boccaccini)
27 June 2014	Matteo Boccaccini	Bologna	Brescia	€800,000 (swap with Gerevini)
27 June 2014	Federico Agliardi	Bologna	Cesena	€2.5 million (swap with Ceccarelli)
27 June 2014	Luca Ceccarelli	Cesena	Bologna	€2.5 million (swap with Agliardi)
28 June 2014	Afriyie Acquah	TSG Hoffenheim (Germany)	Parma	Loan
28 June 2014	Edimar Fraga	Cluj (Romania)	Chievo	Free
29 June 2014	Saulo Decarli	Livorno	Eintracht Braunschweig (Germany)	Undisclosed
30 June 2014	Maxi López	Catania	Chievo	Undisclosed
30 June 2014	Abdou Doumbia	Parma	Lecce	€1 million (swap with Casiraghi)
30 June 2014	Daniele Casiraghi	Lecce	Parma	€1 million (swap with Doumbia)
30 June 2014	Emmanuel Cascione	Parma	Cesena	€2.5 million (swap with Ravaglia)
30 June 2014	Nicola Ravaglia	Cesena	Parma	€2.5 million (swap with Cascione)
30 June 2014	Mohamed Traoré (Guinea)	Parma	Cesena	€1.5 million (swap with Lolli)
30 June 2014	Nicolò Lolli	Cesena	Parma	€1.5 million (swap with Traoré)
30 June 2014	Carlo Crialese	Parma	Cesena	€1 million (swap with Turchetta)
30 June 2014	Gianluca Turchetta	Cesena	Parma	€1 million (swap with Crialese)
30 June 2014	Alessio Benedetti	Catanzaro	Cittadella	Undisclosed
30 June 2014	Daniele Gasparetto	Cittadella	S.P.A.L.	Free
1 July 2014	Mohamed Soumarè	Anderlecht (Belgium)	Avellino	Undisclosed
1 July 2014	Nicolò Cherubin	Bologna	Atalanta	2-year loan
1 July 2014	Lazaros Christodoulopoulos	Bologna	Verona	Undisclosed
1 July 2014	Alessandro Capello	Bologna	Cagliari	Undisclosed (swap with Oikonomou)
1 July 2014	Marios Oikonomou	Cagliari	Bologna	Undisclosed (swap with Capello)
1 July 2014	Omar El Kaddouri	Napoli	Torino	Loan
1 July 2014	Stefano Sturaro	Genoa	Juventus	€5,5M
1 July 2014	Stefano Sturaro	Juventus	Genoa	Loan
1 July 2014	Edoardo Goldaniga	Juventus (& Palermo, c)	Perugia	Loan
1 July 2014	Leonardo Mancuso	Carrarese	Cittadella	Undisclosed
1 July 2014	Kaká	Milan	Orlando City (United States)	Free
1 July 2014	Marco Benassi	Internazionale	Torino	Co-ownership
2 July 2014	Filip Đorđević	Nantes (France)	Lazio	Free
2 July 2014	Marco Parolo	Parma	Lazio	Undisclosed
2 July 2014	Dušan Basta	Udinese	Lazio	Loan
2 July 2014	Diego Perotti	Sevilla (Spain)	Genoa	Undisclosed
2 July 2014	Simone Colombi	Atalanta	Cagliari	Undisclosed
2 July 2014	Riccardo Meggiorini	Torino	Chievo	Free
2 July 2014	Gaetano Masucci	Sassuolo	Frosinone	Free
2 July 2014	Ivan Martić	St. Gallen (Switzerland)	Verona	Free
2 July 2014	Pierluigi Gollini	Manchester United (England)	Verona	Free
2 July 2014	Edoardo Pazzagli	Milan	Pistoiese	Free
2 July 2014	Antonio Nocerino	Milan	Torino	Loan
2 July 2014	Joel Untersee	Juventus	Vaduz (Liechtenstein)	Loan
2 July 2014	Tommaso Berni	Torino	Inter	Free
2 July 2014	Simone Aldrovandi	Chievo (& Modena, c)	S.P.A.L.	Loan
2 July 2014	Matteo Ricci	Empoli	Pontedera	Loan
2 July 2014	Simone Della Latta	Empoli	Pontedera	Undisclosed
2 July 2014	Pablo Barrientos	Catania	San Lorenzo (Argentina)	Undisclosed
2 July 2014	Ivan Pelizzoli	Pescara	Virtus Entella	Undisclosed
3 July 2014	Luca Marrone	Sassuolo	Juventus	€5M (Co-ownership resolution)
3 July 2014	Federico Peluso	Juventus	Sassuolo	€4,5M
3 July 2014	Paweł Bochniewicz	Reggina	Udinese	Undisclosed
3 July 2014	Achraf Lazaar	Varese	Palermo	Undisclosed
3 July 2014	Fabrizio Alastra	Trapani	Palermo	Undisclosed
3 July 2014	Sergio Cucchiara	Trapani	Palermo	Loan
3 July 2014	Salvatore Burrai	Modena	Monza	Undisclosed
3 July 2014	Rodrigo Aguirre	Granada (Spain)	Empoli	Loan
3 July 2014	Gian Marco Ferrari	Parma	Crotone	Loan
3 July 2014	Anđelko Savić	Sampdoria	Lausanne (Switzerland)	Loan
3 July 2014	Federico Ricci	Roma	Crotone	Loan
3 July 2014	Rubén Pérez	Atlético Madrid (Spain)	Torino	Loan
3 July 2014	Mattia Caldara	Atalanta	Trapani	Loan
3 July 2014	Lys Gomis	Torino	Trapani	Loan
3 July 2014	Mattia Aramu	Torino	Trapani	Loan
3 July 2014	Filippo Berra	Udinese	Carrarese	Loan
3 July 2014	Alfredo Donnarumma	Cittadella	Pescara	Free
3 July 2014	Alfredo Donnarumma	Pescara	Teramo	Loan
3 July 2014	Jacob Barrett Laursen	Juventus	Odense (Denmark)	Undisclosed
3 July 2014	Prince-Désir Gouano	Atalanta	Rio Ave (Portugal)	Loan
3 July 2014	Christian Pedrinelli	Parma	Renate	Loan
3 July 2014	Luca Rovelli	Parma	Renate	Undisclosed
3 July 2014	Jonny Mosquera	Envigado (Colombia)	Livorno	Loan
3 July 2014	Mohamed Fofana	Lanciano	Catanzaro	Loan
4 July 2014	Cesare Rickler	Bologna	Prato	Loan
4 July 2014	Mirko Vučinić	Juventus	Al Jazira (United Arab Emirates)	€6,3M
4 July 2014	Carlo Pinsoglio	Juventus	Modena	Loan
4 July 2014	Matuzalém	Genoa	Bologna	Free
4 July 2014	Richard Gabriel Marcone	Vicenza	Trapani	Undisclosed
4 July 2014	Marco D'Alessandro	Roma	Atalanta	€2M
4 July 2014	Marquinho	Roma	Ittihad (Saudi Arabia)	Loan
4 July 2014	Lorenzo Coccolo	Torino	Pisa	Undisclosed
4 July 2014	Antonio Barreca	Torino	Cittadella	Loan
4 July 2014	Francesco Finocchio	Parma	Pisa	Loan
4 July 2014	Emmanuel Gyasi	Torino	Pisa	Loan
4 July 2014	Giacomo Benedini	Siena	Pisa	Undisclosed
4 July 2014	Filippo Costa	Chievo	Pisa	Loan
4 July 2014	Alexis Zapata	Envigado (Colombia)	Udinese	Undisclosed
4 July 2014	Lukas Spendlhofer	Internazionale	Sturm Graz (Austria)	Loan
4 July 2014	Alex Valentini	Spezia	Cittadella	Loan
4 July 2014	Marco Modolo	Parma	Gorica (Slovenia)	Loan
4 July 2014	Ronaldo Vanin	Parma	Gorica (Slovenia)	Loan
5 July 2014	Francesco Bardi	Internazionale	Chievo	Loan
5 July 2014	Marco Perrotta	Pescara	Teramo	Undisclosed
5 July 2014	Dániel Tőzsér	Genoa	Parma	Undisclosed (swap with Rosi)
5 July 2014	Aleandro Rosi	Parma	Genoa	Undisclosed (swap with Tőzsér)
6 July 2014	Cristiano Biraghi	Internazionale	Chievo	2-year loan
6 July 2014	Thomas Mangani	Nancy (France)	Chievo	Free
7 July 2014	Kingsley Coman	Paris Saint-Germain (France)	Juventus	Free
7 July 2014	Samuele Longo	Internazionale	Cagliari	Loan
7 July 2014	Simone Benedetti	Internazionale	Cagliari	Undisclosed
7 July 2014	Nicola Leali	Juventus	Cesena	Loan
7 July 2014	Stefano Sensi	Cesena	San Marino	Loan
7 July 2014	Saša Čičarević	Cesena	San Marino	Loan
7 July 2014	Ismaël Karba Bangoura	Cesena	San Marino	Loan
7 July 2014	Andrea De Vito	Avellino	Varese	Undisclosed
7 July 2014	Salih Uçan	Fenerbahçe (Turkey)	Roma	2-year loan
7 July 2014	Ashley Cole	Chelsea (England)	Roma	Free
7 July 2014	Dániel Tőzsér	Parma	Watford (England)	2-year loan
7 July 2014	Alessandro Martinelli	Sampdoria	Modena	Loan
7 July 2014	Kingsley Boateng	Milan	NAC Breda (Netherlands)	Undisclosed
7 July 2014	Raffaele Ioime	Latina	Viareggio	Free
7 July 2014	Antonio Magli	Brescia	Cosenza	Undisclosed
7 July 2014	Octávio Melo Meira	Botafogo (Brazil)	Fiorentina	Loan
7 July 2014	Pavol Farkaš	Chievo	Gabala (Azerbaijan)	Undisclosed
7 July 2014	Yohan Benalouane	Parma	Atalanta	Undisclosed
7 July 2014	Simone Aresti	Savona	Pescara	Free
8 July 2014	Dodô	Roma	Internazionale	2-year loan
8 July 2014	Gennaro Scognamiglio	Parma	Benevento	Undisclosed
8 July 2014	Francesco Pratali	Empoli	Viareggio	Free
8 July 2014	Luca Piana	Sampdoria	Pistoiese	Loan
8 July 2014	Andrea Rossi	Parma	Latina	Loan
8 July 2014	Nicola Ravaglia	Parma	Cosenza	Loan
8 July 2014	Federico Gerardi	Reggina	Cittadella	Undisclosed
8 July 2014	Ferdinando Coppola	Milan	Bologna	Undisclosed
8 July 2014	Giacomo Corduas	Marcianise	Trapani	Undisclosed
8 July 2014	Alessandro Romeo	Trapani	Pistoiese	Undisclosed
8 July 2014	Franco Zuculini	Arsenal Sarandí (Argentina)	Bologna	Free
8 July 2014	Alex Redolfi	Atalanta	Pontedera	Undisclosed
8 July 2014	Daniel Cappelletti	Palermo	Cittadella	Undisclosed
8 July 2014	Bruno Martella	Sampdoria	Crotone	Undisclosed
8 July 2014	Luca Nizzetto	Trapani	Modena	Free
9 July 2014	Antonio Balzano	Pescara	Cagliari	Free
9 July 2014	Ivan Provedel	Chievo	Perugia	Loan
9 July 2014	Valter Birsa	Milan	Chievo	Loan
9 July 2014	Jherson Vergara	Milan	Avellino	Loan
9 July 2014	Moussa Koné	Atalanta	Avellino	Loan
9 July 2014	Sergiu Suciu	Torino	Crotone	Loan
9 July 2014	Filippo Penna	Juventus	Den Bosch (Netherlands)	Loan
9 July 2014	Edoardo Ceria	Juventus (& Atalanta, c)	Den Bosch (Netherlands)	Loan
9 July 2014	Vedran Celjak	Sampdoria	Benevento	Undisclosed
9 July 2014	Marco Silvestri	Chievo	Leeds (England)	Undisclosed
9 July 2014	Marco Paolini	Parma	San Marino	Loan
9 July 2014	Simone Pasa	Inter	Prato	Loan
10 July 2014	Antonino Ragusa	Pescara	Genoa	Loan
10 July 2014	Mattia Sprocati	Parma	Crotone	Loan
10 July 2014	Raffaele Schiavi	Parma	Frosinone	Free
10 July 2014	Riccardo Brosco	Parma	Latina	Undisclosed
10 July 2014	Molla Wague	Granada (Spain)	Udinese	Loan
10 July 2014	Antonino Barillà	Reggina	Trapani	Undisclosed
10 July 2014	Edoardo Blondett	Sampdoria	Cosenza	Undisclosed
10 July 2014	Leonardo Longo	Inter	Prato	Loan
10 July 2014	Davide Agazzi	Atalanta	Lanciano	Loan
10 July 2014	Andrea Conti	Atalanta	Lanciano	Loan
10 July 2014	Luigi Sepe	Napoli	Empoli	Loan
10 July 2014	Niko Datković	HNK Rijeka (Croatia)	Spezia	Loan
10 July 2014	Antonini Čulina	HNK Rijeka (Croatia)	Spezia	Loan
10 July 2014	Radoslav Kirilov	Chievo	Cremonese	Loan
10 July 2014	Kiakis Charalampos	Verona	Barletta	Loan
11 July 2014	Raffaele Di Gennaro	Inter	Latina	Loan
11 July 2014	Leonardo Terigi	Crotone	Alessandria	Undisclosed
11 July 2014	Pierantonio Sassano	Trapani	Cosenza	Loan
11 July 2014	Nadir Minotti	Atalanta	Crotone	Loan
11 July 2014	Lorenzo Crisetig	Inter	Cagliari	Loan
11 July 2014	Marco Russu	Cagliari	Como	Loan
11 July 2014	Constantin Nica	Atalanta	Cesena	Loan
11 July 2014	Urby Emanuelson	Milan	Roma	Free
11 July 2014	Daniele Martinelli	Vicenza	Trapani	Undisclosed
11 July 2014	Filippo Falco	Lecce	Trapani	Loan
11 July 2014	Aladje	Sassuolo	Pro Vercelli	Loan
11 July 2014	Luca Milesi	Atalanta	Pro Vercelli	Loan
11 July 2014	Emanuele Calaiò	Napoli	Catania	Undisclosed
11 July 2014	Ivaylo Chochev	CSKA Sofia (Bulgaria)	Palermo	Undisclosed
11 July 2014	Diego Falcinelli	Sassuolo	Perugia	Loan
11 July 2014	Antonio Zito	Ternana	Avellino	Undisclosed
11 July 2014	Alessandro Matri	Milan	Genoa	Loan
12 July 2014	Francesco Anacoura	Juventus (& Parma, c)	Pro Vercelli	Loan
12 July 2014	Souleymane Doukara	Catania	Leeds (England)	Loan
12 July 2014	Tommaso Bianchi	Sassuolo	Leeds (England)	Undisclosed
12 July 2014	Mattia Stefanelli	Crotone	San Marino	Undisclosed
12 July 2014	Alessandro Marotta	Bari	Benevento	Undisclosed
12 July 2014	Alessio Cragno	Brescia	Cagliari	Undisclosed
12 July 2014	Adil Rami	Valencia (Spain)	Milan	Undisclosed
12 July 2014	Enrico Zampa	Lazio	Trapani	Loan
12 July 2014	Cristiano Lombardi	Lazio	Trapani	Loan
12 July 2014	Giacomo Corduas	Trapani	Santarcangelo	Loan
12 July 2014	Marcelinho	Unattached	Catania	Free
12 July 2014	Alberto Gilardino	Genoa	Guangzhou (China)	Undisclosed
12 July 2014	Mory Koné	Parma	Troyes (France)	Undisclosed
13 July 2014	Valerio Verre	Roma	Udinese	€0,9M
14 July 2014	Valerio Verre	Udinese	Perugia	Loan
14 July 2014	Fábio Ayres	Udinese	Perugia	Undisclosed
14 July 2014	Rômulo	Fiorentina	Verona	Undisclosed
14 July 2014	Andrea Signorini	Benevento	Cittadella	Free
14 July 2014	Pablo Granoche	Chievo	Modena	Undisclosed
14 July 2014	Leonardo Pérez	Cittadella	Ascoli	Undisclosed
14 July 2014	Nicola Rigoni	Chievo	Cittadella	Loan
14 July 2014	Marcus Diniz	Milan	Lecce	Loan
14 July 2014	Alex Pedone	Milan	Carrarese	Undisclosed
14 July 2014	Armando Izzo	Avellino	Genoa	Undisclosed
14 July 2014	Joshua Brillante	Newcastle Jets (Australia)	Fiorentina	Undisclosed
14 July 2014	Stefano Morrone	Parma	Pisa	Loan
15 July 2014	Simone Emmanuello	Atalanta (& Juventus, c)	Pro Vercelli	Loan
15 July 2014	Gianmario Comi	Milan (& Torino, c)	Avellino	Loan
15 July 2014	Caio Rangel	Flamengo (Brazil)	Cagliari	Undisclosed
15 July 2014	Ivica Ivušić	Inter	Prato	Loan
15 July 2014	Matteo Grandi	Cesena	Bassano	Loan
15 July 2014	Nicolò Tonon	Atalanta	Bassano	Loan
15 July 2014	Agon Mehmeti	Palermo	Malmö (Sweden)	Free
15 July 2014	Damiano Zanon	Benevento	Frosinone	Free
15 July 2014	Carlos Labrín	Palermo	San Marcos (Chile)	Undisclosed
15 July 2014	Mattia Valoti	AlbinoLeffe	Verona	Loan
15 July 2014	Simone Sini	Roma	Pisa	Loan
15 July 2014	Alberto Pelagotti	Empoli	Pisa	Loan
15 July 2014	Paolo Rozzio	Fiorentina	Pisa	Loan
15 July 2014	Mounir Obbadi	Monaco (France)	Verona	Loan
15 July 2014	Alexander Merkel	Udinese	Grasshopper (Switzerland)	Loan
15 July 2014	Marco Ezio Fossati	Milan	Perugia	Loan
15 July 2014	Simone Verdi	Milan (& Torino, c)	Empoli	Loan
15 July 2014	Stefano Castellani	Empoli	Forlì	Loan
15 July 2014	Ronaldo Pompeu	Empoli	Pro Vercelli	Loan
15 July 2014	Daniele Ragatzu	Verona	Pro Vercelli	Undisclosed
15 July 2014	Emanuele Pesoli	Carpi	Pescara	Undisclosed
15 July 2014	Umberto Saracco	Torino	Cosenza	Undisclosed
16 July 2014	Emiliano Tortolano	Catania	Cosenza	Loan
16 July 2014	Luka Krajnc	Genoa	Cesena	Undisclosed
16 July 2014	Yann M'Vila	Rubin Kazan (Russia)	Inter	Loan
16 July 2014	Mirko Pigliacelli	Parma	Frosinone	Loan
16 July 2014	Juan Iturbe	Verona	Roma	€22M
16 July 2014	Andrea Petagna	Milan	Latina	Loan
16 July 2014	Eric Herrera	Avellino	Paganese	Undisclosed
16 July 2014	Giusto Priola	Trapani	Bassano	Undisclosed
16 July 2014	Andrea De Falco	Bari	Benevento	Undisclosed
16 July 2014	Gabriele Perico	Cagliari	Cesena	Undisclosed
16 July 2014	Jakub Jankto	Slavia Prague (Czech Republic)	Udinese	Undisclosed
16 July 2014	Juande	Ponferradina (Spain)	Spezia	Free
16 July 2014	Stefano Padovan	Juventus	Crotone	Loan
16 July 2014	Victor da Silva	Chievo	Pescara	Loan
16 July 2014	Ali Sowe	Chievo	Pescara	Loan
16 July 2014	Edmund Hottor	Milan	Venezia	Loan
17 July 2014	Godfred Donsah	Verona	Cagliari	Undisclosed
17 July 2014	Matteo Zanini	Cesena	Cosenza	Loan
17 July 2014	Alessandro Bastrini	Novara	Ternana	Loan
17 July 2014	Emiliano Massimo	Avellino	Viareggio	Undisclosed
17 July 2014	Massimo Maccarone	Sampdoria	Empoli	Free
17 July 2014	Ernesto Torregrossa	Verona	Crotone	Loan
17 July 2014	Luca Berardocco	Parma	Crotone	Loan
17 July 2014	Abdoul Sissoko	Udinese	Granada (Spain)	Loan
17 July 2014	Giuseppe Biava	Lazio	Atalanta	Free
17 July 2014	Stefano Lucchini	Atalanta	Cesena	Undisclosed
17 July 2014	Mario Šitum	Dinamo Zagreb (Croatia)	Spezia	Loan
17 July 2014	Michu	Swansea (England)	Napoli	Loan
17 July 2014	Doudou Mangni	Atalanta	Latina	Loan
17 July 2014	Alberto Almici	Atalanta	Latina	Loan
17 July 2014	Jonathan Rossini	Sassuolo	Bari	Loan
18 July 2014	Lorenzo Del Prete	Novara	Perugia	Undisclosed
18 July 2014	Marco Davide Faraoni	Watford (England)	Udinese	Undisclosed
18 July 2014	Guilherme	Corinthians (Brazil)	Udinese	Undisclosed
18 July 2014	Vittorio Parigini	Torino	Perugia	Loan
18 July 2014	Stefano Beltrame	Sampdoria	Modena	Loan
18 July 2014	Adrian Stoian	Chievo	Bari	Loan
18 July 2014	Denilson Gabionetta	Parma	Salernitana	Loan
18 July 2014	Roberto Inglese	Chievo	Carpi	Loan
18 July 2014	Matteo Mandorlini	Brescia	Pisa	Undisclosed
18 July 2014	Gaetano Berardi	Sampdoria	Leeds United (England)	Undisclosed
18 July 2014	Fabio Quagliarella	Juventus	Torino	€3,5M
18 July 2014	Amidu Salifu	Verona	Modena	Loan
18 July 2014	Alessandro Gatto	Fiorentina	Modena	Loan
18 July 2014	Nicola Ferrari	Verona	Modena	Undisclosed
18 July 2014	Massimo Volta	Sampdoria	Cesena	Loan
18 July 2014	Lorenzo Gioia	Sampdoria	Avellino	Undisclosed
18 July 2014	Alex Benvenga	Varese	Messina	Undisclosed
18 July 2014	Robin Quaison	AIK (Sweden)	Palermo	Undisclosed
18 July 2014	Luigi Falcone	Lecce	Varese	Undisclosed
18 July 2014	Filippo Perucchini	Lecce	Varese	Loan
18 July 2014	Panagiotis Tachtsidis	Genoa	Verona	Loan
18 July 2014	Giuseppe De Luca	Atalanta	Bari	Loan
18 July 2014	Matteo Contini	Atalanta	Bari	Loan
18 July 2014	Nicola Donazzan	Mantova	Cittadella	Free
18 July 2014	Fabio Alba	Verona	Venezia	Loan
18 July 2014	Mattia Zaccagni	Verona	Venezia	Loan
19 July 2014	Andrea Soncin	Avellino	Pavia	Undisclosed
19 July 2014	Alfred Duncan	Sampdoria	Sampdoria	2-year loan
19 July 2014	Marco Sansovini	Spezia	Virtus Entella	Undisclosed
19 July 2014	Davide Savi	Atalanta	FeralpiSalò	Loan
19 July 2014	Álvaro Morata	Real Madrid (Spain)	Juventus	€20M
19 July 2014	Enis Nadarević	Genoa	Trapani	Loan
19 July 2014	Filippo De Col	Virtus Entella	Spezia	Undisclosed
19 July 2014	Vlada Avramov	Cagliari	Torino	Free
19 July 2014	Leandro Paredes	Boca Juniors (Argentina)	Roma	Loan
21 July 2014	Ryder Matos	Fiorentina	Córdoba (Spain)	Loan
21 July 2014	Giorgio Fumana	Torino	Lumezzane	Undisclosed
21 July 2014	Rodrigo Ely	Milan	Avellino	Undisclosed
21 July 2014	Rodrigo Taddei	Roma	Perugia	Free
21 July 2014	Gastón Silva	Defensor Sporting (Uruguay)	Torino	Undisclosed
21 July 2014	Niccolò Belloni	Inter	Pro Vercelli	Loan
21 July 2014	Patrice Evra	Manchester United (England)	Juventus	£1,2M
21 July 2014	Richmond Boakye	Genoa (& Juventus, c)	Atalanta (& Juventus, c)	€1.3 million
22 July 2014	Domenico Maietta	Verona	Bologna	Undisclosed
22 July 2014	Fabián Rinaudo	Sporting CP (Portugal)	Catania	Undisclosed
22 July 2014	José Campaña	Crystal Palace (England)	Sampdoria	Undisclosed
22 July 2014	Matteo Scozzarella	Atalanta	Trapani	Loan
22 July 2014	Simone Farelli	Siena	Latina	Free
22 July 2014	Francesco Valiani	Siena	Latina	Free
22 July 2014	Simone Salviato	Novara	Bari	Undisclosed
22 July 2014	Alessandro Micai	Südtirol	Bari	Undisclosed
22 July 2014	Francesco Dettori	Carrarese	Pescara	Free
22 July 2014	Tiberio Guarente	Sevilla (Spain)	Empoli	Undisclosed
22 July 2014	Simone Calvano	Verona	Pistoiese	Loan
22 July 2014	Lukáš Zima	Genoa	Venezia	Loan
22 July 2014	Nicolas Napol	Lorient (France)	Atalanta	Undisclosed
22 July 2014	Vincenzo Fiorillo	Juventus (& Sampdoria, c)	Pescara	Loan
22 July 2014	Gabriel Appelt Pires	Juventus	Pescara	Loan
23 July 2014	Alessandro Rosina	Siena	Catania	Free
23 July 2014	Šime Vrsaljko	Genoa	Sassuolo	Undisclosed
23 July 2014	Karim Laribi	Sassuolo	Bologna	Loan
23 July 2014	Pierluigi Cappelluzzo	Siena	Verona	Free
23 July 2014	Ângelo	Siena	Latina	Free
23 July 2014	Paolo Dellafiore	Siena	Latina	Free
23 July 2014	Manuel Coppola	Siena	Cesena	Free
23 July 2014	Zé Eduardo	Parma	Cesena	Undisclosed
23 July 2014	Walter Samuel	Inter	Basel (Switzerland)	Free
23 July 2014	Mauro Bollino	Palermo	Foggia	Undisclosed
23 July 2014	Eddi Gava	Voghera	Ternana	Undisclosed
23 July 2014	Alen Stevanović	Torino	Bari	Loan
23 July 2014	Federico Angiulli	Avellino	Reggiana	Undisclosed
23 July 2014	Ettore Mendicino	Lazio	Salernitana	Loan
23 July 2014	Alberto Giuliatto	Parma	Venezia	Loan
23 July 2014	Jerry Mbakogu	Padova	Carpi	Free
23 July 2014	Andrea Mazzarani	Modena	Virtus Entella	Loan
23 July 2014	Diego Vettraino	Trapani	Gubbio	Loan
23 July 2014	Giuseppe Vitale	Trapani	Tuttocuoio	Loan
23 July 2014	Federico Melchiorri	Padova	Pescara	Free
24 July 2014	Angelo Bencivenga	Parma	Foggia	Loan
24 July 2014	Alessandro Gamberini	Napoli	Chievo	Undisclosed
24 July 2014	Hörður Magnússon	Juventus	Cesena	Loan
24 July 2014	Antonio Sanabria	Sassuolo	Roma	€2,4M
24 July 2014	Simone Andrea Ganz	Milan	Como	Undisclosed
24 July 2014	Luca Giannone	Reggiana	Bologna	Loan
24 July 2014	Andrea Schenetti	Como	Cittadella	Undisclosed
24 July 2014	Davide Astori	Cagliari	Roma	Loan
24 July 2014	Kamil Vacek	Chievo	Sparta Prague (Czech Republic)	Undisclosed
24 July 2014	Leonardo Gatto	Atalanta	Lanciano	Loan
25 July 2014	Andrea Sala	Reggiana	Ternana	Loan
25 July 2014	Stefano Russo	Parma	Salernitana	Loan
25 July 2014	Luca Rigoni	Chievo	Palermo	Undisclosed
25 July 2014	Raffaele Pucino	Chievo	Pescara	Loan
25 July 2014	Antonio Palma	Atalanta	Cittadella	Loan
25 July 2014	Roberto Pereyra	Udinese	Juventus	Loan
25 July 2014	Nenê	Cagliari	Verona	Free
25 July 2014	Andrea Schiavone	Juventus	Modena	Loan
25 July 2014	Boadu Maxwell Acosty	Fiorentina	Modena	Loan
25 July 2014	Antonio Donnarumma	Genoa	Bari	Loan
25 July 2014	Daniel Jara Martínez	Genoa	San Marino	Loan
25 July 2014	Wilfred Osuji	Padova	Modena	Free
25 July 2014	Thiago Rangel Cionek	Padova	Modena	Free
25 July 2014	Timothy Nocchi	Juventus	Spezia	Loan
25 July 2014	Gennaro Esposito	Juventus	Venezia	Loan
26 July 2014	Claudio Corsetti	Parma	Savoia	Undisclosed
26 July 2014	Davide Marsura	Udinese	Genoa	Loan
27 July 2014	Krisztián Tamás	Milan	Varese	Loan
27 July 2014	Giulio Sanseverino	Palermo	Savoia	Undisclosed
28 July 2014	Eric Lanini	Palermo	Virtus Entella	Loan
28 July 2014	Cephas Malele	Palermo	Virtus Entella	Loan
28 July 2014	Mattia Cassani	Fiorentina	Parma	Undisclosed
28 July 2014	Walter Bressan	Varese	Cesena	Free
28 July 2014	Marco Cane	Barletta	Crotone	Loan
28 July 2014	Mikael Antonsson	Bologna	Copenhagen (Denmark)	Undisclosed
28 July 2014	Sebastian Mladen	Roma	Südtirol	Loan
29 July 2014	Giuseppe Russo	Lumezzane	Ternana	Loan
29 July 2014	Federico Dionisi	Livorno	Frosinone	Undisclosed
29 July 2014	Nii Nortey Ashong	Fiorentina	Latina	Free
29 July 2014	Giuseppe Fornito	Napoli	Cosenza	Loan
29 July 2014	Denis Baumgartner	Senica (Slovakia)	Sampdoria	Undisclosed
29 July 2014	Guillermo Rodríguez	Torino	Verona	Undisclosed
29 July 2014	Alessandro Ligi	Parma	Bari	Undisclosed
29 July 2014	Claiton	Chievo	Crotone	Free
29 July 2014	José Ángel	Roma	Porto (Portugal)	Undisclosed
29 July 2014	Alessandro Carrozza	Verona	Lecce	Undisclosed
29 July 2014	Ouasim Bouy	Juventus	Panathinaikos (Greece)	Loan
30 July 2014	Juan Surraco	Cittadella	Livorno	Free
30 July 2014	Enej Jelenič	Padova	Livorno	Free
30 July 2014	Luca Crecco	Lazio	Ternana	Loan
30 July 2014	Stefan de Vrij	Feyenoord (Netherlands)	Lazio	Undisclosed
30 July 2014	Matteo Rubin	Siena	Modena	Loan
30 July 2014	Raffaele Nolè	Ternana	Bassano	Free
30 July 2014	Flavio Lazzari	Novara	Pescara	Loan
30 July 2014	Pavol Bajza	Parma	Crotone	Loan
30 July 2014	Faye Balla	Spezia	Olhanense (Portugal)	Undisclosed
30 July 2014	Andrea Lisuzzo	Spezia	Pisa	Undisclosed
30 July 2014	Giacomo Casoli	Spezia	Como	Undisclosed
30 July 2014	Ivano Baldanzeddu	Spezia	Verona	Undisclosed
30 July 2014	Luis Fraiz	Árabe Unido (Panama)	Frosinone	Loan
30 July 2014	Ivano Baldanzeddu	Verona	Virtus Entella	Loan
31 July 2014	Mariano Julio Izco	Catania	Chievo	Undisclosed
31 July 2014	Andrea Tozzo	Sampdoria	Novara	Loan
31 July 2014	Odion Ighalo	Udinese	Watford (England)	Loan
31 July 2014	Zoran Josipovic	Juventus	Lugano (Switzerland)	Loan
31 July 2014	Antonio Rozzi	Lazio	Bari	Loan
31 July 2014	Tomás Rincón	Hamburger SV (Germany)	Genoa	Free
31 July 2014	Leandro Rinaudo	Livorno	Virtus Entella	Free
31 July 2014	Jonathas	Latina	Elche (Spain)	2-year loan
31 July 2014	Fausto Rossi	Juventus	Córdoba (Spain)	Loan
31 July 2014	Desiderio Garufo	Trapani	Novara	Undisclosed
1 August 2014	Gonzalo Bergessio	Catania	Sampdoria	Undisclosed
1 August 2014	José María Basanta	Monterrey (Mexico)	Fiorentina	Undisclosed
1 August 2014	Alan Empereur	Fiorentina	Ischia	Loan
1 August 2014	Edson Braafheid	Unattached	Lazio	Free
1 August 2014	Iago Falque	Tottenham (England)	Genoa	Undisclosed
1 August 2014	Davide Moscardelli	Bologna	Lecce	Undisclosed
1 August 2014	Riccardo Melgrati	Cesena	Südtirol	Loan
1 August 2014	Darío Flores	Juventud	Perugia	Free
2 August 2014	Rômulo	Verona	Juventus	Loan
2 August 2014	Zouhair Feddal	Parma	Palermo	Loan
2 August 2014	Mbaye Diagne	Juventus	Al Shabab (Saudi Arabia)	Loan
2 August 2014	Valon Behrami	Napoli	Hamburger SV (Germany)	Undisclosed
3 August 2014	Dario Del Fabro	Cagliari	Pescara	Loan
3 August 2014	Nicola Malaccari	Atalanta	Savoia	Undisclosed
3 August 2014	Ante Rebić	Fiorentina	RB Leipzig (Germany)	Loan
3 August 2014	Marvin Compper	Fiorentina	RB Leipzig (Germany)	Undisclosed
4 August 2014	N'Diaye Djiby	Chievo	Lumezzane	Loan
4 August 2014	Maicon da Silva	Reggina	Livorno	Undisclosed
4 August 2014	Žan Benedičič	Milan	Leeds (England)	Loan
4 August 2014	Antonio Luna	Aston Villa (England)	Verona	Loan
4 August 2014	Iván Piris	Deportivo Maldonado (Uruguay)	Udinese	Loan
4 August 2014	Axel Gulin	Fiorentina	FeralpiSalò	Loan
4 August 2014	Matteo Pisseri	Parma	Juve Stabia	Loan
4 August 2014	Marco Chiosa	Torino	Avellino	Loan
4 August 2014	Gianni Munari	Parma	Watford (England)	Loan
4 August 2014	Rafael Márquez	Club León (Mexico)	Verona	Loan
4 August 2014	Matteo Gerbaudo	Juventus	Vicenza	Loan
4 August 2014	Mikael Ishak	Parma	Randers (Denmark)	Undisclosed
4 August 2014	Valerio Rosseti	Siena	Juventus	Free
4 August 2014	Mathias Pogba	Crewe Alexandra (England)	Pescara	Undisclosed
5 August 2014	Martino Borghese	Spezia	Varese	Loan
5 August 2014	Rubén Bentancourt	Atalanta	Bologna	Loan
5 August 2014	Rolando Bianchi	Bologna	Atalanta	Loan
5 August 2014	Daniele Cacia	Verona	Bologna	Free
5 August 2014	Stefan Simić	Milan	Varese	Loan
5 August 2014	Juri Cisotti	Chievo	Spezia	Loan
5 August 2014	Jefferson	Latina	Livorno	Free
5 August 2014	Federico Viviani	Roma	Latina	Loan
5 August 2014	Mohamed Coly	Cittadella	Pro Vercelli	Free
5 August 2014	Rafael Romo	Udinese	Mineros (Venezuela)	Loan
5 August 2014	Carlos Blanco Moreno	Barcelona (Spain)	Juventus	Undisclosed
6 August 2014	Leonardo Lovato	Bassano	Fiorentina	Undisclosed
6 August 2014	Isnik Alimi	Chievo	Lumezzane	Loan
6 August 2014	Dani Osvaldo	Southampton (England)	Inter	Loan
6 August 2014	Saphir Taïder	Inter	Southampton (England)	Loan
6 August 2014	Mauricio Isla	Juventus	Q.P.R. (England)	Loan
6 August 2014	Manuel Giandonato	Parma	Salernitana	Loan
6 August 2014	Daniele Paponi	Bologna	Ancona	Loan
6 August 2014	Diego Farias	Chievo	Cagliari	Loan
6 August 2014	Marco Capuano	Pescara	Cagliari	Loan
6 August 2014	Adrián Calello	Chievo	Catania	Undisclosed
6 August 2014	Shkodran Mustafi	Sampdoria	Valencia (Spain)	Undisclosed
6 August 2014	Manu Gavilán	Bologna	Zamora (Spain)	Undisclosed
6 August 2014	Diego Polenta	Genoa	Nacional (Uruguay)	Undisclosed
7 August 2014	Luca Bertoni	Carpi	Südtirol	Undisclosed
7 August 2014	Rafa Paez	Liverpool (England)	Bologna	Loan
7 August 2014	Tonći Kukoč	Brescia	CSKA Sofia (Bulgaria)	Undisclosed
7 August 2014	Mauricio Pinilla	Cagliari	Genoa	Undisclosed
7 August 2014	Luca Ceppitelli	Parma	Cagliari	Undisclosed
7 August 2014	Luca Mazzitelli	Roma	Südtirol	Loan
7 August 2014	Robinho	Milan	Santos (Brazil)	Loan
7 August 2014	Renan Garcia	Sampdoria	Al-Nasr (United Arab Emirates)	Undisclosed
8 August 2014	Melker Hallberg	Kalmar (Sweden)	Udinese	Undisclosed
8 August 2014	Nnamdi Oduamadi	Milan	Crotone	Loan
8 August 2014	Stefano Pettinari	Roma	Latina	Loan
8 August 2014	Giammario Piscitella	Roma	Pistoiese	Loan
8 August 2014	Kévin Constant	Milan	Trabzonspor (Turkey)	Undisclosed
8 August 2014	Luca Iotti	Milan	Elche Ilicitano (Spain)	Undisclosed
8 August 2014	Luca Tedeschi	Parma	Cosenza	Undisclosed
8 August 2014	Giovanni Fenati	Sampdoria	Lucchese	Loan
8 August 2014	Simone Dejori	Sampdoria	Lucchese	Loan
8 August 2014	Matteo Bianchetti	Verona	Empoli	Loan
8 August 2014	Louise Parfait	Cesena	Chiasso (Switzerland)	Undisclosed
9 August 2014	Juan Sánchez Miño	Boca Juniors (Argentina)	Torino	Undisclosed
9 August 2014	Alessandro Crescenzi	Roma	Perugia	Loan
9 August 2014	Matteo Ardemagni	Atalanta	Spezia	Loan
9 August 2014	Andrea Cocco	Verona	Vicenza	Undisclosed
9 August 2014	Abel Gigli	Parma	Crotone	Loan
11 August 2014	Michele Camporese	Fiorentina	Bari	Loan
11 August 2014	Edenílson	Udinese	Genoa	Loan
11 August 2014	Alfred Gomis	Torino	Avellino	Loan
11 August 2014	Emanuele Gatto	Chievo	Lumezzane	Loan
12 August 2014	Nahuel Valentini	Livorno	Spezia	Free
12 August 2014	Michele Ferri	Trapani	Pro Vercelli	Free
12 August 2014	Kenneth Zohore	Fiorentina	Göteborg (Sweden)	Loan
12 August 2014	Emiliano Viviano	Palermo	Sampdoria	Loan
12 August 2014	Michael Rabušic	Verona	Perugia	Loan
12 August 2014	Davide Lanzafame	Unattached	Perugia	Free
12 August 2014	Matteo Legittimo	Parma	S.P.A.L.	Loan
12 August 2014	Renato Dossena	Venezia	Carpi	Undisclosed
12 August 2014	Kevin Vinetot	Genoa	Lecce	Undisclosed
12 August 2014	Francesco Todisco	Lecce	Genoa	Co-ownership resolution
12 August 2014	Giuseppe Bellusci	Catania	Leeds (England)	Loan
12 August 2014	Ibson	Bologna	Recife (Brazil)	Loan
12 August 2014	Marko Bakić	Fiorentina	Spezia	Loan
12 August 2014	Marco Piredda	Cagliari	Ternana	Loan
12 August 2014	Daniele Frabotta	Frosinone	Lupa Roma	Loan
12 August 2014	Ștefan Popescu	Astra Giurgiu (Romania)	Cagliari	Undisclosed
12 August 2014	Fabrizio Grillo	Siena	Pescara	Free
13 August 2014	Matías Vecino	Fiorentina	Empoli	Loan
13 August 2014	Elio De Silvestro	Juventus	Carpi	Loan
13 August 2014	Diego Laxalt	Inter	Empoli	Loan
13 August 2014	Achille Coser	Vicenza	Livorno	Free
13 August 2014	Diego López	Real Madrid (Spain)	Milan	Undisclosed
13 August 2014	Max Taddei	Venezia	Pro Vercelli	Undisclosed
13 August 2014	Giuseppe Greco	Pro Vercelli	Venezia	Undisclosed
13 August 2014	Zoran Svonja	Parma	Salernitana	Loan
13 August 2014	Franco Brienza	Atalanta	Cesena	Undisclosed
13 August 2014	Lorenzo Filippini	Lazio	Bari	Loan
13 August 2014	Pablo Armero	Udinese	Milan	Loan
13 August 2014	Gianmarco Zigoni	Milan	Monza	Loan
13 August 2014	Mirko Eramo	Sampdoria	Ternana	Loan
13 August 2014	Panagiotis Kone	Bologna	Udinese	Undisclosed
13 August 2014	Nicolao Dumitru	Napoli	Veria (Greece)	Loan
13 August 2014	Ante Vukušić	Pescara	Waasland-Beveren (Belgium)	Loan
14 August 2014	José Ángel Crespo	Bologna	Córdoba (Spain)	Loan
14 August 2014	Jonathan Ferrante	Roma	Lucchese	Loan
14 August 2014	Maodo Malick Mbaye	Chievo	Carpi	Loan
14 August 2014	Nicolas	Verona	Lanciano	Loan
14 August 2014	Pasquale De Vita	Verona	Lanciano	Loan
14 August 2014	Alberto Gerbo	Latina	Foggia	Undisclosed
14 August 2014	Guillermo Giacomazzi	Siena	Perugia	Free
14 August 2014	Marco Boscolo Zemelo	Venezia	Perugia	Undisclosed
15 August 2014	Frano Mlinar	Udinese	Aarau (Switzerland)	Loan
15 August 2014	Luigi Vitale	Napoli	Ternana	Undisclosed
16 August 2014	Gary Medel	Cardiff (England)	Inter	Undisclosed
16 August 2014	Jhonny Vidales	Parma	Marítimo (Portugal)	Undisclosed
16 August 2014	Maarten Van Der Want	ADO Den Haag (Netherlands)	Virtus Entella	Undisclosed
18 August 2014	Mato Miloš	HNK Rijeka (Croatia)	Spezia	Loan
18 August 2014	Marko Marin	Chelsea (England)	Fiorentina	Loan
18 August 2014	Leandro Chichizola	River Plate (Argentina)	Spezia	Undisclosed
18 August 2014	Mario Mercadante	Bari	Matera	Undisclosed
19 August 2014	Alexandre Coeff	Udinese	Mallorca (Spain)	Loan
19 August 2014	Kelvin Matute	Crotone	Pro Vercelli	Free
19 August 2014	Elvis Kabashi	Juventus	Den Bosch (Netherlands)	Loan
19 August 2014	Daniele Mori	Udinese	Ascoli	Loan
19 August 2014	Gianmario Comi	Torino	Milan	Co-ownership resolution
19 August 2014	Seyi Adeleke	Lazio	Western Sydney Wanderers (Australia)	Undisclosed
19 August 2014	Abou Diop	Torino	Ternana	Loan
19 August 2014	Federico Piovaccari	Sampdoria	Eibar (Spain)	Loan
19 August 2014	Dario Maltese	Latina	Reggiana	Loan
19 August 2014	Jaime Romero	Udinese	Real Zaragoza (Spain)	Loan
19 August 2014	Gastón Sauro	Basel (Switzerland)	Catania	Undisclosed
19 August 2014	Lorenzo Longo	Bari	Matera	Loan
20 August 2014	Mirko Antenucci	Ternana (& Catania, c)	Leeds (England)	Undisclosed
20 August 2014	Marco Pinato	Milan	Lanciano	Loan
20 August 2014	Gaetano Monachello	Monaco (France)	Lanciano	Loan
20 August 2014	Luca Crescenzi	Lazio	Reggina	Undisclosed
20 August 2014	Jonathan de Guzmán	Villarreal (Spain)	Napoli	Undisclosed
20 August 2014	Federico Fernández	Napoli	Swansea City	Undisclosed
20 August 2014	Massimo Loviso	Parma	Gubbio	Loan
20 August 2014	Pietro Iemmello	Spezia	Foggia	Loan
21 August 2014	Armin Bačinović	Palermo	Lanciano	Free
21 August 2014	Richard Samnick	Bari	Martina	Loan
21 August 2014	Paolo Grossi	Verona	Lanciano	Loan
21 August 2014	Daniele Franco	Spezia	Torres	Loan
21 August 2014	Giacomo Beretta	Milan	Pro Vercelli	Loan
21 August 2014	Ignacio Fideleff	Napoli	Ergotelis (Greece)	Loan
21 August 2014	Nunzio Di Roberto	Varese	Pro Vercelli	Loan
21 August 2014	Gianluca Musacci	Parma	Frosinone	Loan
21 August 2014	Santiago Gentiletti	San Lorenzo (Argentina)	Lazio	Undisclosed
21 August 2014	Eduardo Vargas	Napoli	Q.P.R. (England)	Loan
21 August 2014	Loris Damonte	Varese	Messina	Loan
22 August 2014	Mihai Bălașa	Roma	Crotone	Loan
22 August 2014	Zaine Pierre	Genoa	Aversa Normanna	Loan
22 August 2014	Cristiano Rossi	Varese	Ascoli	Loan
22 August 2014	Gabriele Passamonti	Spezia	Mantova	Loan
22 August 2014	Davide Gavazzi	Sampdoria	Ternana	Loan
22 August 2014	Daniele Vantaggiato	Padova	Livorno	Free
22 August 2014	Ștefan Popescu	Cagliari	Ternana	Loan
22 August 2014	Eugênio Rômulo Togni	Avellino	S.P.A.L.	Loan
23 August 2014	Nicolò Sperotto	Carpi	Cosenza	Loan
23 August 2014	Nico Pulzetti	Bologna	Cesena	Loan
23 August 2014	Franco Mussis	Copenhagen (Denmark)	Genoa	Loan
25 August 2014	Mario Balotelli	Milan	Liverpool (England)	Undisclosed
25 August 2014	Riccardo Bocalon	Inter	Prato	Loan
25 August 2014	Joseph Minala	Lazio	Bari	Loan
25 August 2014	Emerson Palmieri	Santos (Brazil)	Palermo	Loan
25 August 2014	Francesco Lodi	Catania	Parma	Loan
25 August 2014	Lucas Souza	Olhanense (Portugal)	Parma	Undisclosed
25 August 2014	Filip Janković	Parma	Catania	Loan
25 August 2014	Valerio Nava	Atalanta	Carpi	Loan
25 August 2014	Emanuele Suagher	Atalanta	Carpi	Loan
25 August 2014	Matteo Ricci	Roma	Carpi	Loan
25 August 2014	Andrea Ingegneri	Cesena	Bassano	Loan
25 August 2014	Michele Mangiapelo	Frosinone	Grosseto	Loan
25 August 2014	Andrea Boron	Carpi	Grosseto	Loan
25 August 2014	Yves Baraye	Chievo	Torres	Loan
25 August 2014	Davide Petermann	Palermo	Südtirol	Loan
26 August 2014	Sol Bamba	Trabzonspor (Turkey)	Palermo	Free
26 August 2014	Giancarlo González	Columbus Crew (United States)	Palermo	Undisclosed
26 August 2014	Christian Battocchio	Watford (England)	Virtus Entella	Loan
26 August 2014	Luca Cognigni	Carpi	Ancona	Loan
26 August 2014	Simon Laner	Verona	Carpi	Loan
26 August 2014	Rubén Botta	Inter	Chievo	Loan
26 August 2014	Ezequiel Schelotto	Inter	Chievo	Loan
26 August 2014	Marcel Buchel	Juventus	Bologna	Loan
26 August 2014	Dídac Vilà	Milan	Eibar (Spain)	Loan
26 August 2014	Mehdi Benatia	Roma	Bayern Munich (Germany)	€26M
26 August 2014	Alessandro Sbaffo	Chievo	Latina	Loan
26 August 2014	Massimo Donati	Verona	Bari	Undisclosed
26 August 2014	Lorenzo Laverone	Varese	Vicenza	Undisclosed
26 August 2014	Tanasiy Kosovan	Vicenza	Varese	Undisclosed
26 August 2014	Marcos de Paula	Chievo	Lumezzane	Loan
26 August 2014	Alessandro Pasotti	Lumezzane	Chievo	Loan
26 August 2014	Petar Golubović	Roma	Pistoiese	Loan
26 August 2014	Tomislav Šarić	Parma	Pistoiese	Loan
26 August 2014	Kostas Manolas	Olympiacos (Greece)	Roma	€13M
26 August 2014	Daniele Bazzoffia	Parma	Olhanense (Portugal)	Undisclosed
27 August 2014	Cristiano Piccini	Fiorentina	Real Betis (Spain)	Loan
27 August 2014	Gonzalo Mastriani	Parma	Olhanense (Portugal)	Loan
27 August 2014	Davide Marsura	Genoa	Modena	Loan
27 August 2014	Andrea Costa	Sampdoria	Parma	Undisclosed
27 August 2014	Marco Marchionni	Parma	Sampdoria	Undisclosed
27 August 2014	Aniello Cutolo	Pescara	Livorno	Loan
27 August 2014	Damjan Đoković	Bologna	Livorno	Loan
27 August 2014	Gustavo Campanharo	Bragantino (Brazil)	Verona	Loan
27 August 2014	Francesco Zampano	Verona	Pescara	Loan
27 August 2014	Valmir Berisha	Roma	Panathinaikos (Greece)	Loan
28 August 2014	Emiliano Alfaro	Lazio	Liverpool (Uruguay)	Loan
28 August 2014	Albano Bizzarri	Genoa	Chievo	Undisclosed
28 August 2014	Alberto Cerri	Parma	Lanciano	Loan
28 August 2014	Rafał Wolski	Fiorentina	Bari	Loan
28 August 2014	Carlos Carbonero	River Plate (Argentina)	Cesena	2-year loan
28 August 2014	Isaac Cofie	Genoa	Chievo	Loan
28 August 2014	Giuseppe Torromino	Crotone	Grosseto	Loan
28 August 2014	Ahmed Rassoul Gueye	Juventus	Reggiana	Loan
28 August 2014	Gianmarco De Feo	Lanciano	Savona	Loan
28 August 2014	Luca Verna	Lanciano	Grosseto	Loan
28 August 2014	Michele Moroni	Parma	Cremonese	Loan
28 August 2014	Lucas Evangelista	São Paulo (Brazil)	Udinese	€4M
28 August 2014	Davide D'Appolonia	Venezia	Vicenza	Undisclosed
28 August 2014	Mauro Vigorito	Venezia	Vicenza	Undisclosed
28 August 2014	Niccolò Corticchia	Vicenza	Como	Loan
29 August 2014	Alberto Torelli	Carpi	Santarcangelo	Loan
29 August 2014	Marco Cane	Crotone	Messina	Loan
29 August 2014	Aljaž Struna	Palermo	Carpi	Loan
29 August 2014	Carlos Embalo	Palermo	Carpi	Loan
29 August 2014	Valerio Rosseti	Juventus	Atalanta	Loan
29 August 2014	Frederik Sørensen	Juventus	Verona	Loan
29 August 2014	Vinícius Freitas	Lazio	Perugia	Loan
29 August 2014	Brayan Perea	Lazio	Perugia	Loan
29 August 2014	Matías Silvestre	Inter	Sampdoria	Loan
29 August 2014	Francesco Modesto	Padova	Crotone	Free
29 August 2014	Alessandro Potenza	Modena	Foggia	Free
29 August 2014	Fernando Torres	Chelsea (England)	Milan	2-year loan
29 August 2014	James Troisi	Juventus	Zulte Waregem (Belgium)	Loan
29 August 2014	Savvas Gentsoglou	Sampdoria	Ergotelis (Greece)	Undisclosed
29 August 2014	Mateusz Lewandowski	Pogoń Szczecin (Poland)	Virtus Entella	Loan
29 August 2014	Agostino Camigliano	Udinese	Virtus Entella	Loan
30 August 2014	Simon Makienok	Brøndby (Denmark)	Palermo	Undisclosed
30 August 2014	Francesco Benussi	Udinese	Verona	Undisclosed
30 August 2014	Nico López	Udinese	Verona	Loan
30 August 2014	David López	Espanyol (Spain)	Palermo	Undisclosed
30 August 2014	Mateus Ribeiro	Empoli	Mosta (Malta)	2-year loan
30 August 2014	Nana Welbeck	Atalanta	Krka (Slovenia)	Loan
30 August 2014	José Holebas	Olympiacos (Greece)	Roma	€1M
30 August 2014	Guido D'Attilio	Agropoli	Avellino	Undisclosed
31 August 2014	Ricardo Bagadur	HNK Rijeka (Croatia)	Fiorentina	Undisclosed
31 August 2014	Paul Papp	Chievo	Steaua București (Romania)	Loan
31 August 2014	Alessio Cerci	Torino	Atlético Madrid (Spain)	Undisclosed
31 August 2014	Milan Badelj	Hamburger SV (Germany)	Fiorentina	Undisclosed
31 August 2014	Goran Pandev	Napoli	Galatasaray (Turkey)	Undisclosed
31 August 2014	Blerim Džemaili	Napoli	Galatasaray (Turkey)	Undisclosed
31 August 2014	Dario Del Fabro	Cagliari (previously on loan to Pescara)	Leeds (England)	Loan
1 September 2014	Bruno Peres	Santos (Brazil)	Torino	Undisclosed
1 September 2014	Alessio Sestu	Chievo	Brescia	Loan
1 September 2014	Marco Gargiulo	Brescia	Chievo	Undisclosed
1 September 2014	Marco Gargiulo	Chievo	Brescia	Loan
1 September 2014	Nélson Marcos	Palermo	Belenenses (Portugal)	Free
1 September 2014	Marko Vešović	Torino	HNK Rijeka (Croatia)	Loan
1 September 2014	Davide Brivio	Torino	Verona	Loan
1 September 2014	Josip Brezovec	HNK Rijeka (Croatia)	Spezia	Loan
1 September 2014	Dario Čanađija	HNK Rijeka (Croatia)	Spezia	Loan
1 September 2014	Luca Castellazzi	Inter	Torino	Free
1 September 2014	Souleymane Coulibaly	Tottenham (England)	Bari	Undisclosed
1 September 2014	Saphir Taïder	Southampton (England)	Inter	Loan return
1 September 2014	Tomislav Gomelt	Tottenham (England)	Bari	Loan
1 September 2014	Matteo Momentè	Varese	AlbinoLeffe	Loan
1 September 2014	Abel Hernández	Palermo	Hull City (England)	Undisclosed
1 September 2014	Attila Filkor	Milan	Avellino	Loan
1 September 2014	Andrea Raimondi	Trapani	Venezia	Undisclosed
1 September 2014	Angelo Casadei	Lanciano	Paganese	Loan
1 September 2014	Vlada Avramov	Torino	Atalanta	Loan
1 September 2014	Leonardo Capezzi	Fiorentina	Varese	Loan
1 September 2014	Davide Cinaglia	Torino	Ascoli	Undisclosed
1 September 2014	Gabriel	Milan	Carpi	Loan
1 September 2014	Alessio Romagnoli	Roma	Sampdoria	Loan
1 September 2014	Riccardo Improta	Genoa	Bologna	Loan
1 September 2014	Jasmin Kurtić	Sassuolo	Fiorentina	Loan
1 September 2014	Vid Belec	Inter	Konyaspor (Turkey)	Loan
1 September 2014	Saphir Taïder	Inter	Sassuolo	Loan
1 September 2014	Marco van Ginkel	Chelsea (England)	Milan	Loan
1 September 2014	Andrea Consigli	Atalanta	Sassuolo	Undisclosed
1 September 2014	Daniel Bessa	Inter	Bologna	Loan
1 September 2014	Luka Đorđević	Zenit (Russia)	Sampdoria	Loan
1 September 2014	Naldo	Udinese	Getafe (Spain)	Loan
1 September 2014	Amauri	Parma	Torino	Undisclosed
1 September 2014	Paolo De Ceglie	Juventus	Parma	Loan
1 September 2014	Matías Cabrera	Cagliari	Estoril (Portugal)	Undisclosed
1 September 2014	João Pedro	Estoril (Portugal)	Cagliari	Undisclosed
1 September 2014	Camillo Ciano	Napoli	Parma	Undisclosed
1 September 2014	Camillo Ciano	Parma	Crotone	2-year loan
1 September 2014	Raffaele Maiello	Napoli	Crotone	Loan
1 September 2014	Maxime Lestienne	Al-Arabi (Qatar)	Genoa	Loan
1 September 2014	Luca Savelloni	Pescara	Aversa Normanna	Loan
1 September 2014	José Ángel Blanco	Real Madrid (Spain)	Sampdoria	Undisclosed
1 September 2014	Bartosz Salamon	Sampdoria	Pescara	Loan
1 September 2014	Roberto Gagliardini	Atalanta	Spezia	Loan
1 September 2014	Antonio Mazzotta	Crotone	Cesena	Undisclosed
1 September 2014	Davide Leto	Crotone	Martina	Loan
1 September 2014	Facundo Roncaglia	Fiorentina	Genoa	Loan
1 September 2014	Juan Antonio	Sampdoria	Parma	Undisclosed
1 September 2014	Djamel Mesbah	Parma	Sampdoria	Undisclosed
1 September 2014	Bryan Cristante	Milan	Benfica (Portugal)	Undisclosed
1 September 2014	Steve Leo Beleck	Fiorentina	Crotone	Loan
1 September 2014	Simone Bentivoglio	Chievo	Brescia	Loan
1 September 2014	José Campaña	Sampdoria	Porto (Portugal)	Loan
1 September 2014	Ledian Memushaj	Lecce	Pescara	Loan
1 September 2014	Javier Saviola	Olympiacos (Greece)	Verona	Undisclosed
1 September 2014	Giacomo Bonaventura	Atalanta	Milan	Undisclosed
1 September 2014	Micah Richards	Manchester City (England)	Fiorentina	Loan
1 September 2014	Edoardo Scrosta	Lanciano	Mantova	Loan
1 September 2014	Filipe Gomes	Perugia	Lecce	Loan
1 September 2014	Mapou Yanga-Mbiwa	Newcastle (England)	Roma	Loan
1 September 2014	Alessandro Berardi	Lazio	Grosseto	Loan
1 September 2014	Josip Elez	Lazio	Grosseto	Loan
1 September 2014	Alejandro Gómez	Metalist (Ukraine)	Atalanta	Undisclosed
1 September 2014	Pape Dia	Udinese	Carpi	Loan
1 September 2014	Vincent Diouf	Avellino	Bra	Loan
1 September 2014	Juan Antonio	Parma	FeralpiSalò	Loan
1 September 2014	Ivan Kelava	Granada (Spain)	Carpi	Loan
1 September 2014	Emanuel Rivas	Spezia	Varese	Undisclosed
1 September 2014	Maikol Negro	Latina	Salernitana	Loan
1 September 2014	Luca Tremolada	Varese	Reggiana	Loan
1 September 2014	Felice Piccolo	Cluj (Romania)	Spezia	Free
1 September 2014	Bruno Petković	Catania	Varese	Loan
1 September 2014	Ferdinando Sforzini	Pescara	Latina	Undisclosed
1 September 2014	Luca Martinelli	Empoli	Novara	Loan
1 September 2014	Piotr Zieliński	Udinese	Empoli	Loan
1 September 2014	Romano Perticone	Novara	Empoli	Undisclosed
1 September 2014	Francesco Luoni	AlbinoLeffe	Varese	Undisclosed
1 September 2014	Jevrem Kosnić	Palermo	Honvéd (Hungary)	Loan
1 September 2014	Souleymane Doukara	Catania	Leeds (England)	Undisclosed
1 September 2014	Sebastián Sosa	Palermo	Empoli	Undisclosed
1 September 2014	Sebastián Sosa	Empoli	Vllaznia (Albania)	Loan
1 September 2014	Antonio Meola	Livorno	Barletta	Loan
1 September 2014	Ricardo Álvarez	Inter	Sunderland (England)	Loan
1 September 2014	Bocar Djumo	Inter	Sliema (Malta)	Loan
1 September 2014	João Silva	Bari	Palermo	Undisclosed
1 September 2014	Youssou Lo	Inter	Mosta (Malta)	Loan
1 September 2014	Sebastián Ribas	Genoa	Cartagena (Spain)	Loan
1 September 2014	Cristian Pasquato	Juventus	Pescara	Loan
1 September 2014	Roberto Guana	Chievo	Pescara	Free
1 September 2014	Nikolay Mihaylov	Verona	Mersin İdmanyurdu (Turkey)	Free
2 September 2014	Pol Garcia Tena	Juventus	Vicenza	Loan
2 September 2014	Fabio Sciacca	Catania	Vicenza	Free
3 September 2014	Davide Voltan	Padova	Crotone	Free
8 September 2014	Davide Di Gennaro	Palermo	Vicenza	Loan
12 September 2014	Antonino Ragusa	Genoa	Vicenza	Loan
12 September 2014	Ignacio Lores	Palermo	Vicenza	Loan
15 September 2014	Giuseppe Figliomeni	Latina	Vicenza	Loan
