= List of Italian football transfers winter 2013–14 =

This is a list of Italian football transfers featuring at least one Serie A or Serie B club which were completed from 3 to 31 January 2014, the date which the winter transfer window closed. Free agents could join any club at any time.

== Transfers ==
Legend

- Those clubs in Italic indicate that the player already left the team on loan this season or new signing that immediately left the club
- Players' nationality is only shown for non-EU footballers, excluding loan deal that turned definitive and renewed loans. Serie A clubs could only signed 2 non-EU players from abroad by certain criteria, such as replace departed non-EU player or the club completely did not have non-EU players.

Date	Name	Moving from	Moving to	Fee
16 October 2013 (Note: The player contract will be effective on 3 January 2014)	Adil Rami	Valencia (Spain)	Milan	Loan
27 December 2013	Benoît Ladrière	Unattached	Avellino	Free
2 January 2014	M'Baye Niang	Milan	Montpellier (France)	Loan
3 January 2014	Andrea Pisanu	Bologna	Prato	Loan
3 January 2014	Francesco Lodi	Genoa	Catania	Loan
3 January 2014	Alexander Merkel	Udinese	Watford (England)	Loan
3 January 2014	Yohan Benalouane	Parma	Atalanta	Loan
3 January 2014	Jaime Valdés	Parma	Colo-Colo (Chile)	Undisclosed
3 January 2014	Mathias Ranégie	Udinese	Watford (England)	Undisclosed
3 January 2014	Giuseppe Madonia	Trapani	Catanzaro	Undisclosed
4 January 2014	Lorenzo Ariaudo	Cagliari	Sassuolo	Undisclosed
4 January 2014	Roberto Vitiello	Unattached	Palermo	Free
4 January 2014	Keisuke Honda (Japan)	CSKA Moscow (Russia)	Milan	Free
6 January 2014	Massimiliano Carlini	Cremonese	Frosinone	Undisclosed
7 January 2014	Edoardo Scrosta	Lanciano	Bassano	Loan
7 January 2014	Matteo Bianchetti	Verona	Spezia	Loan
7 January 2014	Radja Nainggolan	Cagliari	Roma	Loan
8 January 2014	Rubén Botta (Argentina)	Livorno	Inter	Undisclosed
8 January 2014	Giuseppe Torromino	Crotone	Virtus Entella	Loan
8 January 2014	Roberto De Giosa	Latina	Reggiana	Undisclosed
8 January 2014	Karim Laribi	Sassuolo	Latina	Loan
8 January 2014	Massimiliano Benassi	Lecce	Juve Stabia	Loan
9 January 2014	Panagiotis Tachtsidis	Catania	Torino	Loan
9 January 2014	Adilson Tavares Varela	Sunderland (England)	Genoa	Loan
9 January 2014	Denis Alibec	Inter	Astra Giurgiu (Romania)	Undisclosed
9 January 2014	(Nigeria) Ezekiel Henty	Milan	Perugia	Loan
9 January 2014	Saulo Decarli	Livorno	Avellino	Loan
9 January 2014	Michael Bradley	Roma	Toronto (Canada)	$10M
10 January 2014	Zé Eduardo	Genoa	Coritiba (Brazil)	Loan
10 January 2014	Alessandro Marotta	Bari	Grosseto	Loan
10 January 2014	Fabián Rinaudo	Sporting Lisboa (Portugal)	Catania	Loan
10 January 2014	Marco Sansovini	Spezia	Novara	Loan
10 January 2014	Timothy Nocchi	Juventus	Padova	Loan
10 January 2014	Alberto Libertazzi	Novara	L'Aquila	Loan
10 January 2014	Simone Colombi	Atalanta	Carpi	Loan
10 January 2014	Giuseppe Abruzzese	Crotone	Lecce	Undisclosed
10 January 2014	Fabio Lebran	Crotone (& Parma, c; at Gorica (Slovenia) , t)	SPAL	Loan
11 January 2014	Antonio Vutov	Levski Sofia (Bulgaria)	Udinese	Undisclosed
13 January 2014	Michele Murolo	Juve Stabia	Vicenza	Undisclosed
13 January 2014	Angelo Di Stasio	Vicenza	Juve Stabia	Undisclosed
14 January 2014	Andrea Doninelli	Juve Stabia (& Genoa, c)	Benevento (& Genoa, c)	Undisclosed (transfer of co-ownership)
14 January 2014	Alex Ferrari	Bologna	Crotone	Loan
14 January 2014	Riccardo Improta	Chievo (& Genoa, c)	Padova	Loan
15 January 2014	Henry Damián Giménez	Bologna	Nacional (Uruguay)	Undisclosed
15 January 2014	Enzo Maresca	Sampdoria	Palermo	Undisclosed
15 January 2014	Thomas Manfredini	Genoa	Sassuolo	Undisclosed
15 January 2014	Alessandro Matri	Milan	Fiorentina	Loan
16 January 2014	Antonio Rosati	Napoli	Fiorentina	Loan
16 January 2014	Alex Calderoni	Juve Stabia	Carrarese	Free
16 January 2014	Raffaele Bianco	Unattached	Carpi	Free
16 January 2014	Dario Barraco	Latina	Lecce	Undisclosed
17 January 2014	Davide Carcuro	Ternana	Venezia	Undisclosed
17 January 2014	Guido Marilungo	Atalanta	Cesena	Loan
17 January 2014	Roberto Gagliardini	Atalanta	Cesena	Loan
17 January 2014	Fabio Ferrari	Ternana	Bellaria	Loan
17 January 2014	Alberto Almici	Atalanta	Padova	Loan
17 January 2014	Mirko Pigliacelli	Parma	Reggina	Loan
17 January 2014	Mory Koné	Parma	Crotone	Loan
18 January 2014	Renato Kelić	Slovan Liberec (Czech Republic)	Padova	Undisclosed
18 January 2014	Jorginho	Verona	Napoli	Co-ownership
18 January 2014	Paolo De Ceglie	Juventus	Genoa	Loan
18 January 2014	Anderson	Manchester United (England)	Fiorentina	Loan
20 January 2014	Mirko Eramo	Sampdoria	Empoli	Loan
20 January 2014	Federico Moretti	Catania	Padova	Loan
20 January 2014	Elia Legati	Padova	Carpi	Loan
20 January 2014	Filippo Falco	Lecce	Juve Stabia	Loan
20 January 2014	Marco Piccioni	La Fiorita (San Marino)	Juve Stabia	Undisclosed
20 January 2014	Guido Davì	Juve Stabia	Free agent	Released
20 January 2014	Daniele Ragatzu	Verona	Lanciano	Loan
20 January 2014	Álvaro Pereira (Uruguay)	Inter	São Paulo (Brazil)	Loan
20 January 2014	Simone Calvano	Verona	AlbinoLeffe	Loan
20 January 2014	Michel Bastos	Al Ain (United Arab Emirates)	Roma	Loan
20 January 2014	Simon Poulsen	Sampdoria	AZ Alkmaar (Netherlands)	Free
20 January 2014	Francesco De Rose	Reggina	Lecce	Loan
21 January 2014	Savvas Gentsoglou	Sampdoria	Spezia	Loan
21 January 2014	Andrea De Falco	Bari	Juve Stabia	Loan
21 January 2014	Matteo Liviero	Juventus	Juve Stabia	Loan
21 January 2014	Pietro Iemmello	Spezia	Pro Vercelli	Loan
21 January 2014	Davide Gavazzi	Sampdoria	Ternana	Loan
21 January 2014	Aleandro Rosi	Parma	Sassuolo	Loan
21 January 2014	Pedro Filipe Mendes	Parma	Sassuolo	Co-ownership
21 January 2014	Jonathan Rossini	Sassuolo (& Sampdoria, c)	Parma	Loan
21 January 2014	Ezequiel Schelotto	Inter	Parma	Loan
21 January 2014	Nicola Sansone	Parma	Sassuolo	Co-ownership
21 January 2014	Antonino Barillà	Sampdoria	Reggina	Loan return
21 January 2014	Andrea Tozzo	Sampdoria	Latina	Loan
21 January 2014	Luca Giannone	Pro Patria	Crotone	Loan
22 January 2014	Gianvito Plasmati	Lanciano	Siena	Undisclosed
22 January 2014	Alessandro Lambrughi	Livorno	Novara	Loan
22 January 2014	Paolo Castellini	Sampdoria	Livorno	Undisclosed
22 January 2014	Carl Valeri	Sassuolo	Ternana	Undisclosed
22 January 2014	Rocco D'Aiello	Trapani	Messina	Undisclosed
23 January 2014	Nicolás Burdisso	Roma	Genoa	Undisclosed
23 January 2014	Jherson Vergara	Milan	Parma	Loan
23 January 2014	Marco Motta	Juventus	Genoa	Loan
23 January 2014	Abou Diop	Torino	Crotone	Loan
23 January 2014	Davide Biondini	Genoa	Sassuolo	Loan
23 January 2014	Matteo Ardemagni	Atalanta	Carpi	Loan
23 January 2014	Nicholas Caglioni	Crotone	Lecce	Undisclosed
23 January 2014	Eduardo Vargas	Napoli	Valencia (Spain)	Loan
24 January 2014	Adryan	Flamengo (Brazil)	Cagliari	Loan
24 January 2014	Niko Datković	HNK Rijeka (Croatia)	Spezia	Loan
24 January 2014	Giammario Piscitella	Pescara	Roma	Co-ownership resolution, €1.5M (swap with Caprari)
24 January 2014	Gianluca Caprari	Roma	Pescara	Co-ownership, €1.5M (swap with Piscitella)
24 January 2014	Tomas Švedkauskas	Roma	Pescara	Loan
24 January 2014	Federico Viviani	Roma	Latina	Loan
24 January 2014	Fábio Alexandre Silva Nunes	Blackburn (England)	Latina	Loan
24 January 2014	Luca Belingheri	Livorno	Cesena	Loan
24 January 2014	Matteo Rubin	Siena	Chievo	Loan
24 January 2014	Manuel Pamić	Chievo	Siena	Loan
24 January 2014	Alessandro Crescenzi	Roma	Novara	Loan
25 January 2014	Mario Sampirisi	Genoa	Olhanense (Portugal)	Loan
25 January 2014	Antonio Nocerino	Milan	West Ham (England)	Loan
25 January 2014	Marco Borriello	Roma	West Ham (England)	Loan
27 January 2014	Michael Essien	Chelsea (England)	Milan	Free
27 January 2014	Paolo Frascatore	Roma	Reggina	Loan
27 January 2014	Luca Di Matteo	Vicenza	Padova	Undisclosed
27 January 2014	Filippo Scaglia	Torino	Cittadella	Loan
27 January 2014	Marcos de Paula	Chievo	Lumezzane	Loan
27 January 2014	Michele Canini	Atalanta	Chievo	Loan
27 January 2014	Antonio Di Nardo	Ischia	Juve Stabia	Free
27 January 2014	Antonio Adán	Cagliari	Real Betis (Spain)	Free
27 January 2014	Andrea Tabanelli	Cesena	Cagliari	Co-ownership
27 January 2014	Paul Papp	Chievo	Astra Giurgiu (Romania)	Loan
28 January 2014	Simone Salviato	Novara	Pescara	Loan
28 January 2014	Mattia Montini	Benevento	Juve Stabia	Loan
28 January 2014	William Jidayi	Juve Stabia	Cittadella	Loan
28 January 2014	Michele Paolucci	Siena	Latina	Undisclosed
28 January 2014	Lino Marzorati	Sassuolo	Modena	Undisclosed
28 January 2014	Maxi López	Catania	Sampdoria	Loan
28 January 2014	Mariano Andújar	Catania	Napoli	Co-ownership
28 January 2014	Mariano Andújar	Napoli	Catania	Loan
28 January 2014	Dario Maltese	Latina (& Palermo, c)	L'Aquila	Loan
29 January 2014	Mario Santana	Genoa	Olhanense (Portugal)	Loan
29 January 2014	Dániel Tőzsér	Genoa	Watford (England)	Loan
29 January 2014	Djamel Mesbah	Parma	Livorno	Loan
29 January 2014	Hassan Yebda	Granada (Spain)	Udinese	Loan
29 January 2014	Antonio Sanabria (Paraguay)	Barcelona (Spain)	Sassuolo	€4,5M
29 January 2014	Ousmane Dramé	Padova	Sporting Lisboa (Portugal)	Free
29 January 2014	Leandro Paredes (Argentina)	Boca Juniors (Argentina)	Chievo	Loan
29 January 2014	Nicola Bellomo	Torino (& Chievo, c)	Spezia	Loan
29 January 2014	Matías Vecino	Fiorentina	Cagliari	Loan
29 January 2014	Anthony Rivituso	Chievo	Spezia	Loan
29 January 2014	Andrea Cocco	Verona (at Reggina, t)	Beira-Mar (Portugal)	Loan
29 January 2014	Niccolò Di Stefano	Inter	Varese	Loan
29 January 2014	Samuele Pizza	Viareggio	Avellino	Loan
30 January 2014	Vinícius Freitas	Lazio	Padova	Loan
30 January 2014	Rubén Olivera	Fiorentina	Brescia	Undisclosed
30 January 2014	Danilo D'Ambrosio	Torino	Inter	Undisclosed
30 January 2014	Cristian Molinaro	VfB Stuttgart (Germany)	Parma	Undisclosed
30 January 2014	Michele Franco	Varese	Perugia	Undisclosed
30 January 2014	Kris Jogan	Verona	Aversa Normanna	Loan
30 January 2014	Marcelo Estigarribia	Chievo	Atalanta	Loan
30 January 2014	Hélder Postiga	Valencia (Spain)	Lazio	Loan
30 January 2014	Sergio Floccari	Lazio	Sassuolo	Undisclosed
30 January 2014	Uroš Radaković	Bologna	Novara	Loan
30 January 2014	Samuele Romeo	Empoli	Juve Stabia	Undisclosed
30 January 2014	Luca Martinelli	Juve Stabia	Empoli	Undisclosed
30 January 2014	Fabrizio Grillo	Siena	Varese	Loan
30 January 2014	Erik Friberg	Malmö (Sweden)	Bologna	Undisclosed
30 January 2014	Giammario Piscitella	Roma	Cittadella	Loan
30 January 2014	Martino Borghese	Spezia	Lugano (Switzerland)	Loan
30 January 2014	Matteo Brighi	Torino	Sassuolo	Undisclosed
30 January 2014	Henrique Adriano Buss	Palmeiras (Brazil)	Napoli	Undisclosed
30 January 2014	Jasmin Kurtić	Sassuolo (& Palermo, c)	Torino	Loan
30 January 2014	Boadu Maxwell Acosty	Chievo	Carpi	Loan
30 January 2014	Laurențiu Brănescu	Juventus (at Juve Stabia, t)	Lanciano	Co-ownership, €1.65M (€0.25M + 50% Thiam)
30 January 2014	Mame Baba Thiam (Senegal)	Lanciano	Juventus	Co-ownership, €1.4M
30 January 2014	Mame Baba Thiam (Senegal)	Juventus	Lanciano	Loan
30 January 2014	Marco Silvestri	Chievo	Cagliari	Loan
30 January 2014	Michael Agazzi	Cagliari	Chievo	Undisclosed
30 January 2014	Irfan Šahman	Parma	Padova	Loan
30 January 2014	Daniele Mori	Udinese	Brescia	Co-ownership, €2 million (part of Camigliano)
30 January 2014	Agostino Camigliano	Brescia	Udinese	€3 million (€1M plus Mori)
30 January 2014	Agostino Camigliano	Udinese	Brescia	Loan
30 January 2014	Douglas Santos	Granada (Spain)	Udinese	Undisclosed
30 January 2014	Bruno Miguel Borges Fernandes	Novara	Udinese	Co-ownership resolution
30 January 2014	Giangiacomo Magnani	Reggiana	Padova	Loan
30 January 2014	Gianluca Austoni	Sampdoria	Aprilia	Co-ownership
31 January 2014	Adel Taarabt	Q.P.R. (England)	Milan	Loan
31 January 2014	Modibo Diakité	Sunderland (England)	Fiorentina	Loan
31 January 2014	Antonio Meola	Livorno	Crotone	Loan
31 January 2014	Andrea Bovo	Spezia	Pescara	Undisclosed
31 January 2014	Alessio Viola	Reggina	Frosinone	Loan
31 January 2014	Hernanes	Lazio	Inter	Undisclosed
31 January 2014	Dani Osvaldo	Southampton (England)	Juventus	Loan
31 January 2014	Gaël Kakuta	Chelsea (England)	Lazio	Loan
31 January 2014	Iván Pillud	Racing (Argentina)	Verona	Loan
31 January 2014	Michael Rabušic	Slovan Liberec (Czech Republic)	Verona	Undisclosed
31 January 2014	Marquinho	Roma	Verona	Loan
31 January 2014	Simon Laner	Verona	Novara	Loan
31 January 2014	Ishak Belfodil	Inter	Livorno	Loan
31 January 2014	Paolo Cannavaro	Napoli	Sassuolo	Loan
31 January 2014	Faouzi Ghoulam	Saint-Étienne (France)	Napoli	Undisclosed
31 January 2014	Pablo Armero	Napoli	West Ham (England)	Loan
31 January 2014	Andy Polo (Peru)	Universidad San Martìn (Peru)	Inter	Undisclosed
31 January 2014	Adama Guidiala	Inter	Olympique de Marseille (France)	Loan
31 January 2014	Samuele Longo	Inter	Rayo Vallecano (Spain)	Loan
31 January 2014	Daniel Bessa	Inter	Sparta Rotterdam (Netherlands)	Loan
31 January 2014	Frederic Injai	Inter	Saint-Étienne (France)	Loan
31 January 2014	Alessio Sestu	Chievo	Sampdoria	Loan
31 January 2014	Luigi Luciani	Sampdoria	Spezia	Loan
31 January 2014	Nicola Pozzi	Sampdoria	Parma	Undisclosed
31 January 2014	Stefano Okaka	Parma	Sampdoria	Undisclosed
31 January 2014	Vedran Celjak	Sampdoria	Benevento	Loan
31 January 2014	Adrian Stoian	Genoa	Chievo	Loan return
31 January 2014	Nicola Rigoni	Chievo	Cittadella	Loan
31 January 2014	Simone Emmanuello	Atalanta	Pro Vercelli	Loan
31 January 2014	Matteo Scozzarella	Atalanta	Spezia	Loan
31 January 2014	Matteo Gentili	Atalanta	Vicenza	Co-ownership
31 January 2014	Ciro Polito	Atalanta	Sassuolo	Undisclosed
31 January 2014	Mamadou Samassa	Chievo	Pescara	Undisclosed
31 January 2014	Pablo Granoche	Chievo	Modena	Loan
31 January 2014	Gianluca Cafferata	Sampdoria	Pavia	Loan
31 January 2014	Tiberio Guarente	Sevilla (Spain)	Chievo	Loan
31 January 2014	Rubén Bentancourt	PSV Eindhoven (Netherlands)	Atalanta	Undisclosed
31 January 2014	Victor Obinna	Lokomotiv Moscow (Russia)	Chievo	Loan
31 January 2014	Francesco Fedato	Bari (& Catania, c)	Catania (& Sampdoria, c)	Undisclosed (Transfer of co-ownership)
31 January 2014	Federico Agliardi	Bologna	Cesena	Loan
31 January 2014	Abdallah Yaisien	Bologna	Trapani	Loan
31 January 2014	Alessandro Bastrini	Novara	Cagliari	Loan
31 January 2014	Andrea Tabanelli	Cagliari	Leeds (England)	Loan
31 January 2014	Ibson	Corinthians (Brazil)	Bologna	Undisclosed
31 January 2014	Pierre Zaine	Genoa	Messina	Loan
31 January 2014	Jonathan Ferrante	Roma	Lumezzane	Loan
31 January 2014	Vlad Marin	Juventus	Roma	Loan
31 January 2014	Alberto Tibolla	Chievo	Roma	Loan
31 January 2014	Tomáš Vestenický	Nitra (Slovakia)	Roma	Loan
31 January 2014	Valmir Berisha	Halmstad (Sweden)	Roma	Undisclosed
31 January 2014	Petar Golubović	OFK Beograd (Serbia)	Roma	€1,5M
31 January 2014	Rafael Toloi	São Paulo (Brazil)	Roma	Loan
31 January 2014	Petar Golubović	Roma	Novara	Loan
31 January 2014	Giuseppe Sculli	Lazio	Genoa	Loan
31 January 2014	Enis Nadarević (Bosnia and Herzegovina)	Genoa	Bari	Loan
31 January 2014	Niccolò Giannetti	Siena	Spezia	Co-ownership
