= Moreno Beretta =

Italian professional footballer

Personal information
- Date of birth: 28 May 1993 (age 33)
- Place of birth: Santa Margherita Ligure, Italy
- Height: 1.82 m (6 ft 0 in)
- Position: Forward

Youth career
- Sampdoria

Senior career*
Years	Team	Apps	(Gls)
2012–2014	Sampdoria	0	(0)
2012–2013	→ Portogruaro (loan)	0	(0)
2013	→ Virtus Entella (loan)	4	(0)
2013–2014	→ Paganese (loan)	6	(1)
2014	→ San Marino (loan)	11	(1)
2014–2015	Pisa	11	(1)
2015–2016	Mantova	6	(0)
Total		38	(3)

International career
2011	Italy U18	4	(3)
2011	Italy U19	3	(0)
- * Club domestic league appearances and goals

Moreno Beretta (born 28 May 1993) is an Italian former footballer who plays as a forward.

== Career ==
Born in Santa Margherita of the Liguria region, Beretta started his career at the city of Genoa, the capital of Liguria, for U.C. Sampdoria. In 2012, he left the reserve team for Lega Pro Prima Divisione club Portogruaro, along with Edoardo Blondett, Andrea Magrassi, Alessandro Martinelli, Andrea Tozzo and Giuseppe Zampano in temporary deal, on 2 August 2012. On 31 January 2013 Beretta left for fellow third division club Virtus Entella. On 13 July 2013 Beretta remained in the third division for Paganese. On 28 January 2014 he was signed by San Marino with option to renew the loan. The Sanmarinese club finished as the second from the bottom of Group A. However, due to the merger of the two divisions of Lega Pro (ex–Serie C), no teams would be relegated from Lega Pro Prima Divisione to Serie D in 2014, except Nocerina due to sports fraud.

On 12 July 2014 he was released by Sampdoria. On 6 October 2014 he was signed by Pisa.

In summer 2015, he was signed by Mantova. On 15 July 2016, he was released.
