= Giuseppe Zampano =

Italian footballer

Personal information
- Full name: Giuseppe Marco Zampano
- Date of birth: 30 September 1993 (age 33)
- Place of birth: Genoa, Italy
- Height: 1.77 m (5 ft 10 in)
- Position: Right-back

Team information
- Current team: La Fiorita
- Number: 30

Youth career
- 2009–2012: Sampdoria
- 2010–2011: → Virtus Entella (loan)

Senior career*
| Years | Team | Apps | (Gls) |
| 2012–2013 | Portogruaro | 12 | (0) |
| 2013–2014 | Martina Franca | 16 | (1) |
| 2014–2016 | Crotone | 47 | (3) |
| 2017–2019 | Venezia | 55 | (1) |
| 2019–2020 | Cesena | 10 | (0) |
| 2020–2021 | Reggiana | 13 | (0) |
| 2021–2022 | Fidelis Andria | 7 | (0) |
| 2022 | Potenza | 13 | (0) |
| 2024– | La Fiorita | 7 | (0) |
- * Club domestic league appearances and goals as of 12 March 2024

Giuseppe Marco Zampano (born 30 September 1993) is an Italian footballer who plays as a right-back for La Fiorita.

== Career ==
Born in Genoa, Liguria along with his twin brother Francesco in 1993, they were youth products of Sampdoria. In 2010–11 season both left for another Ligurian team Virtus Entella in temporary deal. Francesco remained in Chiavari (where Entella is based) and Giuseppe returned to Genoa for 2011–12 season.

Zampano along with Moreno Beretta, Edoardo Blondett, Andrea Magrassi, Alessandro Martinelli and Andrea Tozzo, they were transferred to Lega Pro Prima Divisione club Portogruaro in temporary deal, on 2 August 2012. Zampano played 12 times in 2012–13 Italian third division season.

Zampano became a free agent on 1 July 2013. On 6 December 2013 he was signed by Lega Pro Seconda Divisione club Martina.

On 18 June 2014, he was signed by Serie B club Crotone on a free transfer on a 3-year contract. After having terminated the contract with the Crotone, in January 2017, he signed with Venezia team that plays in the Lega Pro.

On 5 December 2019, he signed with Serie C club Cesena until the end of the 2019–20 season.

On 24 August 2020 he joined Reggiana.

On 27 September 2021, he moved to Fidelis Andria. On 8 January 2022, he signed with Potenza.
