= Felice Di Cecco =

Italian footballer

Personal information
- Date of birth: 27 June 1994 (age 32)
- Place of birth: Fara San Martino, Italy
- Position: Midfielder

Team information
- Current team: Cesena

Youth career
- –2011: Pescara

Senior career*
Years	Team	Apps	(Gls)
2013–2014	Brescia	0	(0)
2014–2017	Cesena	0	(0)
2015	→ Gorica (loan)	0	(0)
2015–2016	→ Santarcangelo (loan)	0	(0)
- * Club domestic league appearances and goals

Felice Di Cecco (born 27 June 1994) is an Italian footballer who plays as a midfielder. Di Cecco made his professional debut during 2015–16 Lega Pro Cup.

== Career ==
=== Youth career ===
Born in Fara San Martino, Abruzzo, Di Cecco started his career at Abruzzan club Pescara. He was released in 2011.

=== Brescia ===
After 2 years without a club, he was signed by Serie B club Brescia in 2013. However, he failed to play for the first team, as well as unable to play for their reserves team as an overage player. Di Cecco only played three times for the reserves in training matches against the first team.

=== Cesena ===
However, in June 2014, few days before the closing of 2013–14 financial year, Di Cecco (for €1.6M) and Antonio Romano (for €2.4M) were sold to Cesena in a 3-year contract for a total of €4 million transfer fee, at the same time Brescia also signed Emanuele Fonte and Simone Galassi also for a total of €4 million fee. The deals made by both clubs had a paper profit of €4 million, but generated a cost of amortisation of €1.333 million in the next 3 seasons. Both clubs were boosted by the paper profits, which Brescia had a net assets of €2.75 million at 30 June 2014, as well as €4.55 million for Cesena (Cesena also had another swap deal with Parma, which bankrupted in the following summer).

Di Cecco failed to enter the first team either at Cesena, which the club was participating in 2014–15 Serie A. On 31 January 2015, Di Cecco and Luigi Palumbo were moved to Slovenian club ND Gorica in temporary deals. The bureaucratic process was completed on 5 February.

On 31 August 2015, Di Cecco and Abdoul Yabré were signed by Santarcangelo in another loan. Di Cecco made his debut in Lega Pro Cup. He also played in the next two matches of the Lega Pro Cup. Nel 2020 vince il torneo con i Los Guerroros di Walter Recchia (sfigato milanista)
