= Andrea Tozzo =

Italian footballer (born 1992)

Personal information
- Date of birth: 30 August 1992 (age 34)
- Place of birth: Riva del Garda, Italy
- Height: 1.92 m (6 ft 3 1/2 in)
- Position: Goalkeeper

Youth career
- 2001–2010: Verona
- 2009–2010: → Fiorentina (loan)
- 2010–2012: Sampdoria

Senior career*
Years	Team	Apps	(Gls)
2012–2019	Sampdoria	0	(0)
2012–2013	→ Portogruaro (loan)	31	(0)
2014	→ Latina (loan)	0	(0)
2014–2016	→ Novara (loan)	40	(0)
2017	→ Matera (loan)	15	(0)
2018–2019	→ Hellas Verona (loan)	0	(0)
2019–2022	Ternana	9	(0)
2020–2021	→ Mantova (loan)	22	(0)
2021–2022	→ Teramo (loan)	12	(0)
2022	→ Seregno (loan)	15	(0)
2022–2023	Cesena	28	(0)

International career
2011	Italy U19	1	(0)
- * Club domestic league appearances and goals as of 23 April 2023

Andrea Tozzo (born 30 August 1992) is an Italian footballer who plays as a goalkeeper.

== Club career ==
=== Verona ===
Born in Riva del Garda and raised in nearby Torbole, Trentino region, Tozzo started his career at Veneto club Hellas Verona F.C. in 2001. He was a player of the Allievi U16 team for the 2007–08 Veneto regional Allievi League. In the 2008–09 season he was part of the Allievi A team (U17) for the national Allievi League.

=== Fiorentina (loan) ===
Tozzo was promoted to the reserves of Verona for the reserve league dedicated to Lega Pro clubs, but at the start of season Serie A club ACF Fiorentina borrowed Tozzo for its reserve. He was the backup of Andrea Seculin and played 5 times.

=== Sampdoria ===
La Viola did not buy Tozzo outright; instead another first division club, U.C. Sampdoria, borrowed Tozzo with option to buy. Tozzo re-joined Luciano Bruni, vice-coach of Verona first team in 2008–09 season and the coach of Sampdoria reserve team in 2010–11, replacing the departed Marco Costantino as a key player of the reserve. He competed for the starting place with Davide Negretti, who started 13 times and Tozzo 12. In summer 2011 Sampdoria exercised the right to sign Tozzo in co-ownership deal for €100,000 on a four-year contract. Following the departure of Negretti, Tozzo was the only first choice of the reserve in 2011–12 season, in his last season as an eligible player. On 20 June 2012 the co-ownership was renewed.

On 2 August 2012, Tozzo, along with Moreno Beretta, Edoardo Blondett, Andrea Magrassi, Alessandro Martinelli and Giuseppe Zampano, was transferred to Italian third division club Portogruaro in a temporary deal. He became the starting keeper in the first match (round 2) of 2012–13 Lega Pro Prima Divisione, ahead Andrea Bavena who played both matches of the cup. In June 2013 the co-ownership was renewed again. During 2013 financial year he also signed a new five-year contract.

On 21 January 2014, Tozzo joined Serie B side Latina in a loan deal. On 20 June 2014 Sampdoria bought him outright for another €100,000.

==== Novara (loan) ====
On 31 July 2014, Tozzo was signed by Novara Calcio in a temporary deal. The club extended his loan of Tozzo on 10 July 2015 as well as buying Simone Corazza outright from Sampdoria.

==== Matera (loan) ====
On 31 January 2017, Tozzo was loaned to Matera, with Wladimiro Falcone returned to Sampdoria from Livorno, as Tozzo's replacement.

==== Verona (loan) ====
On 3 August 2018, Tozzo joined to Serie B side Hellas Verona a loan with option to buy.

=== Ternana ===
On 3 July 2019, Tozzo signed a 3-years contract with Ternana.

==== Loan to Mantova ====
On 21 August 2020, he was loaned to Mantova.

==== Loans to Teramo and Seregno ====
On 11 August 2021, he joined Teramo on loan. On 22 January 2022, he moved on loan to Seregno.

=== Cesena ===
On 9 September 2022, Tozzo joined Cesena for the 2022–23 season.

== Honours ==
Novara

- Supercoppa di Lega Pro: 2015
- Lega Pro: 2015
