= Pape Dia =

Senegalese footballer

Pape Ndiaga Dia
Personal information
- Full name: Pape Dia
- Date of birth: April 20, 1993 (age 33)
- Place of birth: Dakar, Senegal
- Position: Winger

Senior career*
Years	Team	Apps	(Gls)
2011–2015	Udinese	0	(0)
2013–2014	→ Avellino (loan)	4	(0)
2014	→ Pavia (loan)	8	(0)
2014–2015	→ Carpi (loan)	0	(0)
- * Club domestic league appearances and goals as of (13:22, 19 November 2014 (UTC))

Pape Ndiaga Dia (born April 20, 1993) is a Senegalese footballer.

== Club career ==
=== Udinese ===
==== Loan moves ====
In June 2013, Dia joined A.S. Avellino 1912 on loan, but only went on to play twice in Serie B. Dia joined A.C. Pavia for the second half of the season, making 8 appearances for the Lega Pro club.

On September 1, 2014, Dia joined Carpi on loan until the end of the Serie B season.
