= Antonio Romano (footballer, born 1995) =

Italian footballer

Personal information
- Date of birth: 21 January 1995 (age 31)
- Place of birth: Acerra, Italy
- Position: Forward

Team information
- Current team: Cesena

Youth career
- Internazionale

Senior career*
Years	Team	Apps	(Gls)
2012–2014	Pro Vercelli	1	(0)
2014	Brescia	0	(0)
2014–2017	Cesena	0	(0)
- * Club domestic league appearances and goals

Antonio Romano (born 21 January 1995) is an Italian professional footballer who plays as a forward for Italian Serie B club Cesena.

== Career ==
Born in Acerra, Campania, Romano started his career at Lombard club F.C. Internazionale Milano. He was a player of under-12 team in Lombard Esordienti League in 2006–07 season, to under-17 team in National Allievi League in 2011–12 season. At Inter Milan Romano also received call-up from national youth teams, without any debut. On 13 August 2012, Romano left for the reserve team of Pro Vercelli, initially on a temporary deal. Romano also wore the No. 21 shirt for the first team. He only played once for the Serie B team, on 18 May 2013, the last round of 2012–13 Serie B, as a substitute for Pietro Iemmello at the start of the first half. Romano was substituted by Cristian Bunino in the second half of the match. Pro Vercelli was relegated to Lega Pro Prima Divisione after that match, however also signed Romano outright from Inter.

On 31 January 2014 Romano was signed by Serie B club Brescia Calcio. On 27 June 2014, few days before the closure of 2013–14 financial year, Romano (for €2.4 million) and Felice Di Cecco (for €1.6 million) were sold to Serie A newcomer Cesena, with Emanuele Fonte (for €2.4 million) and Simone Galassi (for €1.6 million) moved to Brescia. Romano signed a three-year contract. Romano failed to play any game for the Romagna-based team. The team was also relegated back to Serie B in May 2015.

In summer 2015, Romano trained with the Romagnol team Santarcangelo. However, on 31 August he returned to Cesena. The club also signed Di Cecco and Abdoul Yabré from Cesena on the same day, as well as Romano's namesake from Napoli on 4 August.
