= Giuseppe Vitale =

Italian footballer

Personal information
- Date of birth: 10 September 1993 (age 33)
- Place of birth: Palermo, Italy
- Height: 1.86 m (6 ft 1 in)
- Position: Midfielder

Team information
- Current team: Paceco

Youth career
- Trapani

Senior career*
Years	Team	Apps	(Gls)
2012–2015	Trapani	2	(0)
2012–2013	→ Licata (loan)	27	(1)
2014	→ Sorrento (loan)	2	(0)
2014–2015	→ Tuttocuoio (loan)	7	(0)
2015–2017	did not play		
2017	Trapani	0	(0)
2017–	Paceco	2	(0)
- * Club domestic league appearances and goals as of 1 December 2017

Giuseppe Vitale (born 10 September 1993) is an Italian football player who plays for Paceco.

== Club career ==
He made his professional debut in the Serie B for Trapani on 19 October 2013 in a game against Spezia.
