= Youssou Lo =

Senegalese footballer

Personal information
- Date of birth: 19 March 1992 (age 34)
- Place of birth: Dakar, Senegal
- Height: 1.85 m (6 ft 1 in)
- Position: Forward

Team information
- Current team: Olhanense

Youth career
- Udinese
- 2011–2012: Vicenza

Senior career*
| Years | Team | Apps | (Gls) |
| 2012–2014 | Vicenza | 3 | (0) |
| 2013 | → Celje (loan) | ? | (?) |
| 2014 | Internazionale | 0 | (0) |
| 2014– | Olhanense | 0 | (0) |
- * Club domestic league appearances and goals

Youssou Lo (born 19 March 1992) is a Senegalese footballer who plays for Olhanense.

== Club career ==
Born in Dakar, Senegal, Lo joined Italian club Udinese Calcio at young age. In 2011 Lo joined Serie B club Vicenza. He made his Serie B debut on 25 August 2012, the first round of 2012–13 Serie B. In January 2013 he left for Slovenian club Celje.

On 12 August 2014 Lo was sold to Serie A club Internazionale. He was immediately left for Portuguese club Olhanense in order to give Inter a non-EU signing quota for international transfer for Chilean Gary Medel.
