= Simone Aldrovandi =

Italian footballer (born 1994)

Personal information
- Date of birth: 2 April 1994 (age 32)
- Place of birth: Carpi, Italy
- Height: 1.86 m (6 ft 1 in)
- Position: Centre back

Team information
- Current team: Poggese Calcio

Youth career
- –2013: Modena
- 2013–2015: Chievo

Senior career*
Years	Team	Apps	(Gls)
2012–2013	Modena	0	(0)
2013–2015	Chievo	0	(0)
2014–2015	→ SPAL (loan)	13	(0)
2015–2017	Modena	38	(0)
2017–2020	Mantova	44	(1)
2020–2021	Foligno	27	(0)
2021–2022	Carpi	27	(0)
2022–2025	SS Cittadella Vis Modena		
2025–	Poggese Calcio		
- * Club domestic league appearances and goals as of 3 October 2025

Simone Aldrovandi (born 2 April 1994) is an Italian footballer who plays as a centre back for Poggese Calcio.

== Club career ==
Born in Carpi, Aldrovandi began his career on Modena's youth categories, and made his first-team debut on 23 November 2011, coming on as a second-half substitute in a 0–3 loss at Chievo, for the campaign's Coppa Italia. On 9 July 2013 he joined Serie A side Chievo.
