= Ivano Baldanzeddu =

Italian football defender

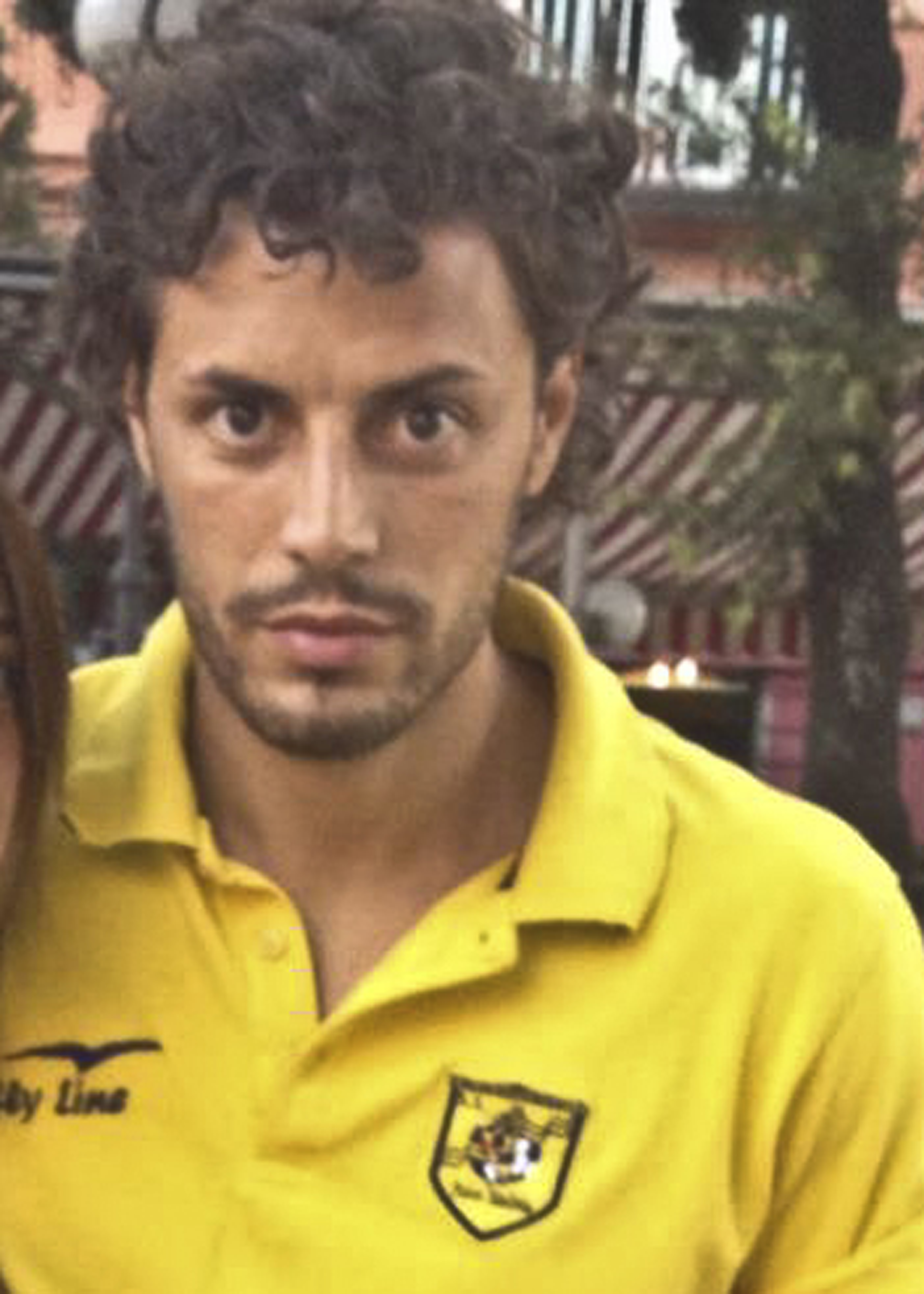

Personal information
- Date of birth: 11 April 1986 (age 40)
- Place of birth: Calangianus, Italy
- Height: 1.82 m (5 ft 11 1/2 in)
- Position: Defender

Youth career
- Calangianus
- 2003–2005: Empoli

Senior career*
Years	Team	Apps	(Gls)
2005–2007	Empoli	2	(0)
2005–2006	→ Massese (loan)	23	(0)
2007–2008	Avellino	1	(0)
2008	→ Ancona (loan)	10	(0)
2008–2009	Foligno	16	(1)
2010–2011	Lucchese	26	(0)
2011–2013	Juve Stabia	70	(0)
2013–2015	Spezia	27	(0)
2014–2015	→ Virtus Entella (loan)	3	(0)
2015–2016	Latina	13	(0)
2016–2017	Venezia	9	(1)
2017	→ Catania (loan)	4	(0)
2017–2018	Arzachena	10	(0)
- * Club domestic league appearances and goals as of 5 May 2018

Ivano Baldanzeddu (born 11 April 1986) is an Italian football defender.
