= Emanuele Fonte =

Italian footballer (born 1992)

Personal information
- Date of birth: 6 August 1992 (age 34)
- Place of birth: Forlì, Italy
- Position: Centre back

Youth career
- –2011: Cesena

Senior career*
Years	Team	Apps	(Gls)
2010–2014	Cesena	1	(0)
2011–2012	→ Mantova (loan)	29	(0)
2012–2013	→ Borgo (loan)	6	(0)
2013–2014	→ Forlì (loan)	5	(1)
2014–2016	Brescia	0	(0)
2015–2016	→ Tre Fiori (loan)	16	(2)
2016–2018	Faetano	31	(3)
2018–2019	Alfonsine FC	27	(6)
2019–2020	Ribelle		
2020	ASD Diegaro		
2020–2021	SSD Futball Cava Ronco		
2021–2022	FCD Vis Novafeltria Calcio		
Total		115	(12)

International career
2010	Italy U19	1	(0)
- * Club domestic league appearances and goals

Emanuele Fonte (born 6 August 1992) is an Italian former professional footballer who plays as a centre back.

== Career ==
=== Cesena ===
Born in Forlì, Romagna, Fonte started his career at Romagnol club Cesena. Fonte made his Serie B debut on 5 January 2010, against Modena. He wore no.31 shirt that season. At the end of season Cesena promoted to Serie A. In 2010–11 Serie A, Fonte was the player of the reserve team only, despite he kept his no.31 shirt for the first team. In 2011, he left for Lega Pro Seconda Divisione club Mantova in temporary deal. The club survived in the relegation "play-out" against Lecco and Vibonese. Fonte was a substitute against Lecco in the first leg; he was in the starting XI against Lecco second leg as well as the first leg against Vibonese.

In 2012 Fonte was signed by Borgo. On 31 January 2013 Fonte left for Forlì, re-joining Leonardo Arrigoni. Fonte remained in Forlì for 2013–14 Lega Pro Seconda Divisione. The club also signed Daniele Forte and Alessandro Tonti from Cesena. Fonte played 5 times for the hometown club only.

Forlì survived from the relegation "play-out" on 8 June 2014. At the end of season also saw the merger of the prime and second division of Lega Pro. Cesena also promoted to Serie A on 18 June 2014.

=== Brescia ===
On 27 June 2014, few days before the closure of 2013–14 financial year, Fonte (for €2.4M) and Simone Galassi (for €1.6M) were sold to Serie B club Brescia Calcio for a total fee of €4 million, with Antonio Romano and Felice Di Cecco moved to opposite direction also for a total fee of €4 million. Fonte signed a three-year contract. However, along with players obtained from the swap deal with Varese (Pachulia and Iunco), Bologna (Boccaccini) and Pescara (Camilli and Gabrielli), they merely became a financial boost to Brescia, than a boost to the strength of the squad. Brescia had a positive net equity of €2,754,794 on 30 June 2014, but including seven new youngsters which signed in June 2014, "worth" €7.8 million. The figure already excluding residual contract value of Nicolò Belotti, Manuel Canini and Daniele Ferri which also signed from swap deal in 2012 and 2013, who failed to find a place in any professional team.

Brescia failed to find a club for Fonte in 2014–15 season, thus Fonte became a ghost player that without a club, but costing the club €800,000 a year as amortization ("weathering" of intangible asset) of his contract value.

However, Fonte and Ferri were re-included in the pre-season for Brescia in July 2015. The club was relegated to 2015–16 Lega Pro. However, on 4 August Brescia was admitted to 2015–16 Serie B. On 5 August Fonte received no.20 shirt of the first team. Fonte received some call-up from Roberto Boscaglia, despite never making any competitive debut. Before the closure of summer transfer window, they left for Sanmarinese side Tre Fiori.
