= Valerio Verre =

Italian footballer (born 1994)

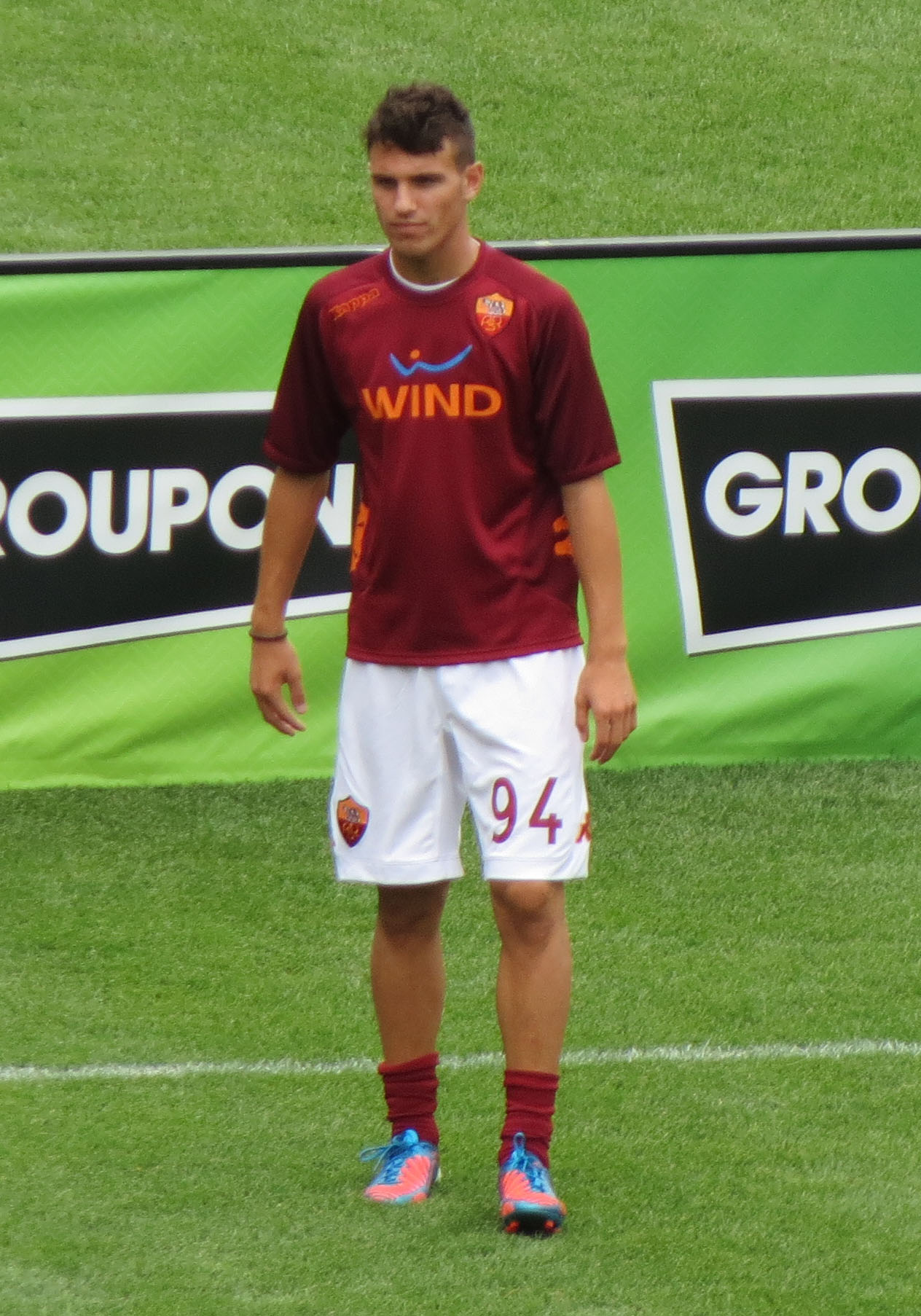
- Verre with Roma in 2012

Personal information
- Date of birth: 11 January 1994 (age 32)
- Place of birth: Rome, Italy
- Height: 1.78 m (5 ft 10 in)
- Position: Attacking midfielder

Youth career
- 1998–2003: Quarto Miglio
- 2003–2004: Real Tuscolano
- 2004–2005: SS Romulea
- 2005–2012: Roma

Senior career*
Years	Team	Apps	(Gls)
2011–2012	Roma	0	(0)
2012–2013	Genoa	0	(0)
2012–2013	→ Siena (loan)	8	(0)
2013–2016	Udinese	0	(0)
2013–2014	→ Palermo (loan)	20	(0)
2014–2015	→ Perugia (loan)	37	(5)
2015–2016	→ Pescara (loan)	31	(1)
2016–2017	Pescara	28	(0)
2017–2024	Sampdoria	99	(4)
2018–2019	→ Perugia (loan)	35	(12)
2019–2020	→ Hellas Verona (loan)	32	(3)
2022	→ Empoli (loan)	8	(0)
2023	→ Palermo (loan)	14	(2)
2024–2025	Palermo	28	(2)
2026	Perugia	13	(0)

International career
2009	Italy U16	3	(1)
2010–2011	Italy U17	14	(3)
2011–2013	Italy U19	22	(2)
2013–2015	Italy U20	12	(0)
2015–2017	Italy U21	8	(0)
- * Club domestic league appearances and goals as of 30 April 2026

Valerio Verre (born 11 January 1994) is an Italian professional footballer who plays as an attacking midfielder.

== Club career ==
=== Roma, Genoa & Siena ===
As a graduate of the reserve team, Verre signed a five-year contract in May 2012. On 30 July he was involved in the transfer of Mattia Destro (€16 million) from Genoa (€8.5 million) and Siena (€7.5 million), while he and Giammario Piscitella went to Genoa in a co-ownership deal for €1.5 million each. Verre was loaned to the beneficiary Siena for one season, as the club gave up on signing one of them from Roma by signing Eugenio Lamanna from Genoa for €1.5 million.

Verre made his Coppa Italia debut for Siena on 19 August 2012 in a match against Vicenza and scored the match's goal. He wore no.16 shirt.

In June 2013, Roma bought back the two players (Verre tagged for €2.5 million; Piscitella €1.5 million) from Genoa for €1 million cash plus Panagiotis Tachtsidis. (who immediately swapped with Francesco Lodi, both 50% registration rights tagged for €3 million)

=== Udinese ===
After returning to Roma in June 2013, Verre was sold to Udinese in a co-ownership agreement for €2.5 million (along with Nicolás López for €1 million) as a part exchange to a transfer deal involving Mehdi Benatia who moved to the Giallorossi for €13.5 million.

==== Loans to Palermo and Perugia ====
After training with Udinese, he was loaned out to Serie B club Palermo on 2 September 2013, the final day of the summer transfer window.

On 13 July 2014, Udinese bought Verre outright from Roma for €900,000. On 12 July 2014, Verre left for Serie B newcomer Perugia in a temporary deal. Verre quickly became a first-choice midfielder for Perugia and an integral part of the team along with youngsters Vittorio Parigini, Edoardo Goldaniga, Nicolo Fazzi, and Ivan Provedel. He helped Perugia to a Serie B promotion playoff and finished the year with five goals and four assists.

=== Sampdoria ===
On 31 January 2017, his rights were purchased by Sampdoria who loaned him back to Pescara.

==== Return to Perugia ====
On 17 August 2018, Verre joined to Serie B side Perugia on loan with an option to buy.

==== Loan to Verona ====
On 10 August 2019, Verre joined Hellas Verona on loan with an option to buy.

==== Loan to Empoli ====
On 29 January 2022, Verre moved to Empoli on loan with an option to buy.

==== Return to Sampdoria and loan to Palermo ====
After his stint at Empoli, Verre returned to Sampdoria, playing the first half of the club's 2022–23 Serie A campaign with the Blucerchiati and being regularly featured in the starting lineup.

On 27 January 2023, Palermo announced to have signed Verre on loan from Sampdoria until the end of the season, with an option to buy.

=== Third stint at Palermo ===
On 9 August 2024, after being released by Sampdoria, Verre signed a three-year contract with Serie B club Palermo, thus returning to Sicily for the third time in his career. The contract with Palermo was mutually terminated in November 2025.

== International career ==
After being part of the Italy U16 and U17 national teams, he began playing in the Italy U18 under the technical guidance of Alberigo Evani, who handed him the captain's armband despite being under age.

On 3 October 2013, he received his first call-up to the Italy U21 team for 2013 UEFA European Under-21 Football Championship qualification match against Belgium on 14 October. He has since been called up to the Italy U21 team for multiple times. On 12 August 2015, he made his debut with the Italy U21 team, in a friendly match against Hungary.

== Career statistics ==
As of match played 10 May 2024

Appearances and goals by club, season and competition
Club	Season	League			Cup		Europe		Other		Total	
Club	Season	Division	Apps	Goals	Apps	Goals	Apps	Goals	Apps	Goals	Apps	Goals
Roma	2011–12	Serie A	0	0	0	0	1	0	–		1	0
Siena (loan)	2012–13	Serie A	8	0	2	1	–		–		10	1
Palermo (loan)	2013–14	Serie B	20	0	0	0	–		–		20	0
Perugia (loan)	2014–15	Serie B	37	5	3	0	–		1 (Note: Appearances in Serie B promotion play-offs)	0	41	5
Pescara (loan)	2015–16	Serie B	31	1	2	0	–		4 (Note: Appearances in Serie B promotion play-offs)	1	37	2
Pescara	2016–17	Serie A	28	0	2	2	–		–		30	2
Sampdoria	2017–18	Serie A	18	0	1	0	–		–		19	0
Sampdoria	2020–21	Serie A	27	3	2	1	–		–		29	4
Sampdoria	2021–22	Serie A	11	0	1	1	–		–		12	1
Sampdoria	2022–23	Serie A	18	0	3	1	–		–		21	1
Sampdoria	2023–24	Serie B	25	1	1	0	–		–		26	1
Sampdoria	Total		99	4	8	3	–		0	0	107	7
Perugia (loan)	2018–19	Serie B	35	12	0	0	–		1 (Note: Appearances in Serie B promotion play-offs)	0	36	12
Hellas Verona (loan)	2019–20	Serie A	32	3	1	0	–		–		33	3
Empoli (loan)	2021–22	Serie A	8	0	–		–		–		8	0
Palermo (loan)	2022–23	Serie B	14	2	–		–		–		14	2
Career total			312	27	18	6	1	0	6	1	337	34

== Honours ==
Palermo

- Serie B: 2013–14
