= Davide Gavazzi =

Italian footballer (born 1986)

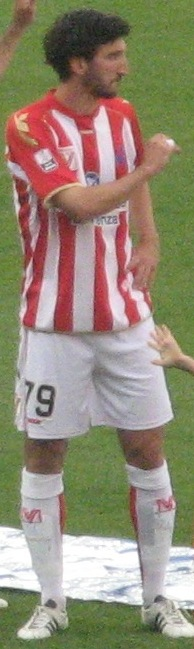
- David Gavazzi in 2012

Personal information
- Date of birth: 7 May 1986 (age 40)
- Place of birth: Sondrio, Italy
- Height: 1.81 m (5 ft 11 in)
- Position: Midfielder

Youth career
- 2002–2003: Milan
- 2003–2004: Lecco
- 2004–2005: Como

Senior career*
Years	Team	Apps	(Gls)
2005–2007	Como	48	(1)
2007–2009	Renate	40	(8)
2009–2013	Vicenza	113	(7)
2013–2015	Sampdoria	7	(0)
2014–2015	→ Ternana (loan)	62	(3)
2015–2018	Avellino	51	(5)
2018–2021	Pordenone	70	(6)
2022	Pordenone	13	(1)
2022–2023	Renate	10	(0)
- * Club domestic league appearances and goals as of 22 April 2023

Davide Gavazzi (born 7 May 1986) is an Italian footballer who plays as a midfielder.

== Career ==
Born in Sondrio, Lombardy, Gavazzi started his career at Lombard team Como. He was the member of the reserve in 2003–04 to 2004–05 season. The club bankrupted in 2005 and a new company was admitted to 2005–06 Serie D. Gavazzi joined the new club and played for 2 1/2 seasons. Gavazzi won the 2007–08 Serie D and the 2007–08 Coppa Italia Serie D. However Gavazzi left the club mid-season, for Renate. Renate was the losing semi-finalist of the 2009 promotion playoffs.

=== Vicenza ===
In July 2009 Gavazzi was signed by Serie B club Vicenza Calcio.

On 24 August 2012 he took no.7 shirt previously worn by Pasquale Maiorino, who changed to no.11.

=== Sampdoria ===
On 7 September 2012, Gavazzi was signed by Serie A club U.C. Sampdoria for €1.2 million in 4-year contract. Vicenza acquired Franco Semioli and Marco Padalino outright for free, as well as the loan of Gavazzi and Zsolt Laczkó. In January 2013 Vicenza released Gavazzi from loan. Gavazzi played 7 times for Sampdoria in Serie A, all in 2013–14 season.

=== Ternana (loan) ===
On 21 January 2014, he was loaned to Serie B side Ternana Calcio.

On 22 August 2014 the loan was renewed.

=== Avellino ===
On 10 July 2015 he was signed by Avellino in a 3-year contract.

=== Pordenone ===
On 19 July 2018, Gavazzi signed for Serie C outfit Pordenone in a 2-year contract. On 10 February 2021, his contract with Pordenone was terminated by mutual consent. On 11 January 2022, he signed a new contract with Pordenone until the end of the 2021–22 season.

=== Return to Renate ===
On 25 July 2022, Gavazzi returned to Renate on a one-year contract.

== Honours ==
Como

- Serie D: 2007–08
- Coppa Italia Serie D: 2007–08
