= Giammario Piscitella =

Italian footballer

Personal information
- Date of birth: 24 March 1993 (age 33)
- Place of birth: Nocera Inferiore, Italy
- Height: 1.75 m (5 ft 9 in)
- Position: Winger

Team information
- Current team: Virtus
- Number: 99

Youth career
- Roma

Senior career*
| Years | Team | Apps | (Gls) |
| 2012 | Roma | 2 | (0) |
| 2012–2013 | Genoa | 6 | (0) |
| 2013 | → Modena (loan) | 13 | (0) |
| 2013–2014 | Pescara | 5 | (0) |
| 2014 | Roma | 0 | (0) |
| 2014 | → Cittadella (loan) | 9 | (0) |
| 2014–2016 | → Pistoiese (loan) | 40 | (7) |
| 2016 | → Bassano (loan) | 9 | (1) |
| 2016–2017 | → Catania (loan) | 6 | (1) |
| 2017–2018 | → Prato (loan) | 51 | (2) |
| 2018–2019 | Carpi | 18 | (0) |
| 2019–2021 | Novara | 37 | (1) |
| 2021–2023 | Rimini | 56 | (6) |
| 2023 | Pistoiese | 9 | (2) |
| 2023–2024 | L'Aquila | 4 | (0) |
| 2024–2025 | NovaRomentin | 7 | (1) |
| 2026– | Virtus | 20 | (5) |

International career^{‡}
| 2011 | Italy U18 | 5 | (0) |
| 2011–2012 | Italy U19 | 5 | (1) |
| 2012–2013 | Italy U20 | 8 | (2) |
| 2012–2013 | Italy U21 | 3 | (0) |
- * Club domestic league appearances and goals as of 25 June 2026 ‡ National team caps and goals as of 5 September 2013

Giammario Piscitella (born 24 March 1993) is an Italian professional footballer who plays as a winger for Campionato Sammarinese di Calcio club Virtus.

== Club career ==
=== Genoa ===
As a graduate of Roma reserve team, Piscitella signed a new five-year contract in May 2012. On 30 July he was involved in the transfer of Mattia Destro (€16 million) from Genoa (€8.5 million) and Siena (€7.5 million), with Piscitella and Valerio Verre going to Genoa in co-ownership deal for €1.5 million each.

=== Pescara ===
In June 2013 Roma bought back the two players (with Verre tagged for €2.5million, Piscitella €1.5 million) from Genoa for €1 million cash plus Panagiotis Tachtsidis. On 1 July 2013, Piscitella left for Pescara for €1.5 million along with Matteo Politano for €500,000, as a direct swap for the return of Gianluca Caprari for €2 million.

=== Return to Roma ===
On 24 January 2014, Piscitella returned to Roma, swapping clubs with Caprari. On 30 January 2014, he was signed by Cittadella.

Piscitella joined Lega Pro club Pistoiese in summer 2014. the loan was renewed in summer 2015. On 5 January 2016, he was signed by Bassano in a temporary deal.

=== Novara ===
On 10 August 2019, he signed a two-year contract with Novara.

=== Rimini ===
On 15 September 2021, he joined Rimini in Serie D. On 17 August 2023, his contract with Rimini was terminated by mutual consent.
