= Edoardo Scrosta =

Italian footballer (born 1992)

Personal information
- Date of birth: 11 July 1992 (age 34)
- Place of birth: Fano, Italy
- Height: 1.82 m (5 ft 11 1/2 in)
- Position: Defender

Team information
- Current team: United Riccione
- Number: 26

Youth career
- –2010: Fano

Senior career*
| Years | Team | Apps | (Gls) |
| 2010–2011 | Fano | 20 | (1) |
| 2011–2015 | Virtus Lanciano | 15 | (0) |
| 2014 | → Bassano Virtus (loan) | 6 | (0) |
| 2014–2015 | → Mantova (loan) | 29 | (1) |
| 2015–2016 | Mantova | 23 | (0) |
| 2016–2018 | AlbinoLeffe | 49 | (4) |
| 2018–2022 | Fermana | 119 | (3) |
| 2022– | United Riccione | 3 | (0) |
- * Club domestic league appearances and goals as of 18 September 2022

Edoardo Scrosta (born 11 July 1992) is an Italian football player who plays as a defender for United Riccione.

== Club career ==
He made his Serie C debut for Virtus Lanciano on 19 February 2012 in a game against Frosinone.

On 10 August 2018, he joined Serie C club Fermana.

On 6 August 2022, Scrosta moved to United Riccione in Serie D.
