= Simone Salviato =

Italian footballer

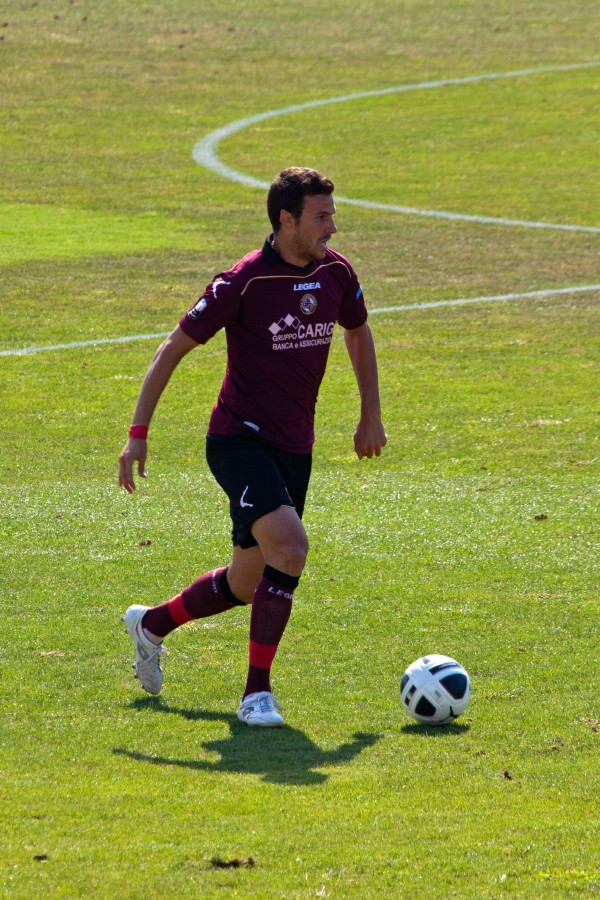

Personal information
- Date of birth: 12 July 1987 (age 39)
- Place of birth: Padua, Italy
- Height: 1.85 m (6 ft 1 in)
- Position: Right back

Team information
- Current team: ASD Limena

Youth career
- Padova
- Venezia

Senior career*
Years	Team	Apps	(Gls)
2005–2006	Trento	35	(2)
2006–2008	Rovigo	52	(1)
2008–2010	Mantova	49	(3)
2010–2013	Livorno	97	(4)
2013–2014	Novara	17	(0)
2014	→ Pescara (loan)	15	(0)
2014–2016	Bari	20	(0)
2016	Virtus Lanciano	14	(1)
2016–2018	Cremonese	41	(1)
2018–2019	Padova	22	(0)
2019	Vicenza	10	(0)
2019–2020	Luparense	17	(1)
2020–2021	Trento	26	(0)
2021–2024	Treviso		
2024–2026	United Borgoricco Campetra		
2026–	ASD Limena		
- * Club domestic league appearances and goals

Simone Salviato (born 12 July 1987) is an Italian footballer who plays as a right back for ASD Limena.

== Career ==
He made his Serie B debut on 25 October 2008 whilst playing for Mantova, in a 3–1 defeat at home to Parma.

Following Mantova's bankruptcy and subsequent demotion to Serie D, Salviato joined Livorno on 11 July 2010.

He was subsequently signed by Novara in July 2013, and loaned out to Pescara in January 2014. He joined Serie B club, Bari, during the summer 2014 transfer market. In January 2016 he moved to Virtus Lanciano; in the summer of that year he accords with Cremonese. On 3 January 2018, he joined Padova on an undisclosed fee.

On 31 January 2019, he signed with Vicenza Virtus.

On 5 September 2019, he joined Serie D club Luparense.

On 2 July 2021 he moved to Treviso in Eccellenza.
