= Daniele Mori =

Italian footballer (born 1990)

Personal information
- Date of birth: 28 June 1990 (age 36)
- Place of birth: Livorno, Italy
- Height: 1.90 m (6 ft 3 in)
- Position: Centre-back

Team information
- Current team: Gavorrano
- Number: 23

Youth career
- Empoli

Senior career*
Years	Team	Apps	(Gls)
2009–2013	Empoli	39	(2)
2013–2014	Udinese	0	(0)
2013–2014	→ Novara (loan)	12	(0)
2014	Brescia	1	(0)
2014–2016	Udinese	0	(0)
2014–2015	→ Ascoli (loan)	23	(0)
2015–2016	→ Lucchese (loan)	7	(0)
2016	→ Santarcangelo (loan)	8	(0)
2016–2017	Sambenedettese	26	(0)
2017–2018	Triestina	2	(0)
2018	→ Gavorrano (loan)	14	(0)
2018–	Gavorrano		

International career
2006	Italy U-16	7	(2)
2006	Italy U-17	3	(0)
2007–2008	Italy U-18	1	(0)
2008	Italy U-19	4	(0)
2009	Italy U-20	2	(0)
2011–2013	Italy U-21	7	(0)
- * Club domestic league appearances and goals as of 19 May 2018

Daniele Mori (born 28 June 1990) is an Italian footballer who plays as a defender for Italian Serie D club Gavorrano.

He wore the number 25 shirt since the end of the 2008–09 Serie B season. He later changed to the number 34 for Brescia during the 2013–14 season.

== Club career ==
=== Empoli ===
Born in Livorno, Tuscany, Mori started his professional career at Tuscan team Empoli F.C. Mori made his Serie B debut on 23 March 2010, replacing Andrea Cupi in the second half. Since the departure of Gabriele Angella to Serie A club Udinese, Mori became one of the starting centre-back to partner with Lorenzo Stovini. Mori played 20 starts in 2010–11 Serie B, shared the role with Lorenzo Tonelli.

=== Udinese ===
On 31 August 2011 he followed the footsteps of Angella to join Udinese in co-ownership deal for €2.1 million. That day the Udine club also bought the remain 50% registration rights of playmaker Diego Fabbrini for €300,000. Mori also returned to Empoli in temporary deal for 2011–12 Serie B as Udinese had plenty of defenders. Mori shared the starting role with Daniele Ficagna (while Tonelli sometimes as right-back).

In June 2012 the co-ownership was renewed. He also returned to Empoli for 2012–13 season.

In June 2013 Udinese signed Angella and Mori outright for €350,000 each.

On 3 July 2013, Mori signed a loan deal with Novara Calcio for the 2013–14 season.

=== Brescia ===
On 30 January 2014, he moved to Brescia in a co-ownership deal with Udinese. Half of his registration rights was valued for €2 million, however, it was part of the deal that Udinese signed Agostino Camigliano for €3 million. On 20 June 2014 Mori returned to Udinese for just €250.

=== Return to Udinese ===
In June 2014 Udinese bought back Mori. However, he spent on loan for 2 more seasons. In August 2014 he was signed by Ascoli in a temporary deal from Udinese. In summer 2015 he was signed by Lucchese again on loan. On 1 February 2016 he was signed by Santarcangelo in a temporary deal.

=== Sambenedettese ===
On 22 August 2016 Mori was signed by Lega Pro newcomer Sambenedettese in a 1-year contract.

=== Triestina ===
Mori joined Triestina on 10 July 2017. The promotion of the team to Serie C was confirmed on 4 August.

== International career ==
Mori has played at every youth level for Italy, although he has not appeared for the senior team. He received his first call-up to 2005 Torneo Giovanile di Natale In December. He finished as a runner-up in a youth tournament held in Montaigu, Vendée, France. He played 2 out of possible 4 matches. (The coach use the combination of Masi (started 4 times), Profeta (2 times), Vincenzo Barbera (3 times) and Carmine Sarno (4 times)) Mori failed to enter the squad for 2007 UEFA European Under-17 Football Championship qualification nor in the elite round. He only played 3 friendlies before the tournament.

In 2007–08 season Mori returned to the under-18 team and played the only match against Serbia U-18 (Serbian: Млађе омладинске селекције Србије) in April. Mori also played once for U-19 in March but failed to enter the squad for 2008 UEFA European Under-19 Football Championship elite qualification. In 2008–09 season he played all three matches of 2009 UEFA European Under-19 Football Championship qualification, which Italy did not qualify. In June 2009 he played for U-19 team (de facto U-20 but coached by U-19 coach Piscedda) in an annual fixture against Serie D Best XI. In 2009–10 season he was the member of under-20, the bridging team to U-21. Mori played two games in the 2009–10 Four Nations Tournament. Mori did not enter the squad for the 2009 Mediterranean Games nor the 2009 FIFA U-20 World Cup.

In January 2011 Mori received his first U-21 call-up from Ciro Ferrara. He made his debut in the following game on 8 February 2011, against England. Mori replaced Federico Macheda in the last minutes. Mori played 6 more friendlies for the Azzurrini, including 2011 Toulon Tournament (where he played 3 out of 5 games, with Capuano and Caldirola were the starting centre-backs). He missed the first round of 2013 UEFA European Under-21 Football Championship qualification due to injury and as an unused bench for the rest of the fixture.
