= Agostino Camigliano =

Italian footballer (born 1994)

Personal information
- Date of birth: 11 July 1994 (age 32)
- Place of birth: Segrate, Italy
- Height: 1.87 m (6 ft 2 in)
- Position: Centre-back

Team information
- Current team: Sambenedettese
- Number: 29

Youth career
- Brescia

Senior career*
Years	Team	Apps	(Gls)
2011–2014	Brescia	20	(0)
2011–2012	→ Seregno (loan)	12	(0)
2014–2017	Udinese	0	(0)
2014–2015	→ Virtus Entella (loan)	2	(0)
2015	→ Cittadella (loan)	8	(0)
2016	→ Trapani (loan)	3	(0)
2016–2017	→ Juve Stabia (loan)	18	(0)
2017–2021	Cittadella	42	(0)
2018	→ Cosenza (loan)	7	(0)
2021–2022	Reggiana	26	(0)
2022–2023	Cosenza	2	(0)
2023–2024	Ancona	14	(0)
2023–2024	→ Pro Vercelli (loan)	34	(0)
2024–2025	Foggia	26	(0)
2025–2026	Potenza	25	(0)
2026–	Sambenedettese	0	(0)

International career^{‡}
2013–2014	Italy U20	1	(0)
- * Club domestic league appearances and goals as of 1 May 2026 ‡ National team caps and goals as of 19 March 2014

Agostino Camigliano (born 11 July 1994) is an Italian professional footballer who plays as a centre-back for Serie C Group B club Sambenedettese.

== Club career ==
Born in Segrate, Camigliano started youth career with Brescia, and after a loan stint with Seregno he was promoted to the first team ahead of 2013–14 season.

On 16 September 2013 Camigliano played his first match as a professional, coming on as a second-half substitute in a 2–1 win at Ternana.

On 30 January 2014 Camigliano joined Udinese for a €1 million cash plus half of the registration rights of Daniele Mori, but Camigliano remained at Brescia on loan until June.

On 27 July 2016 he was signed by Juve Stabia on another loan.

On 31 January 2018 he was signed by Cosenza on loan until June 2018.

On 9 July 2021, he joined Reggiana on a two-year contract.

On 1 September 2022, Camigliano returned to Cosenza.

On 10 January 2023, Camigliano signed a 2.5-year contract with Ancona. On 29 August 2023, he was loaned to Pro Vercelli.

On 12 July 2024, Camigliano moved to Foggia on a two-year contract.
