= Alessandro Bastrini =

Italian footballer (born 1987)

Personal information
- Full name: Alessandro Bastrini
- Date of birth: 3 April 1987 (age 39)
- Place of birth: Domodossola, Italy
- Height: 1.86 m (6 ft 1 in)
- Position: Defender

Youth career
- Como

Senior career*
Years	Team	Apps	(Gls)
2005–2006	Como	0	(0)
2006	→ Sampdoria (loan)	1	(0)
2006–2010	Sampdoria	9	(0)
2008	→ Modena (loan)	13	(0)
2008–2009	→ Sassuolo (loan)	9	(0)
2009–2010	→ Salernitana (loan)	23	(0)
2010–2012	Vicenza	48	(4)
2012–2016	Novara	30	(0)
2014	→ Cagliari (loan)	1	(0)
2014–2015	→ Ternana (loan)	23	(0)
2015–2016	→ Catania (loan)	10	(0)
2016–2017	Catania	13	(0)
2017–2018	Cremonese	6	(0)
2017–2018	→ Reggiana (loan)	18	(2)
2019	Monopoli	7	(0)
2019–2020	Lecco	15	(0)
2020–2021	Monopoli	5	(0)
- * Club domestic league appearances and goals as of 31 January 2021

Alessandro Bastrini (born 3 April 1987) is an Italian former footballer who played as a defender.

== Club career ==
=== Sampdoria ===
Bastrini joined Sampdoria on loan from Como in January 2006, and made his Serie A debut against A.S. Livorno Calcio on 7 May 2006. He was successively sent out on loan to Serie B side Modena in January 2008. In July 2008 he accepted a loan move to Sassuolo, another Serie B team.

In August 2009, he was loaned to Salernitana.

=== Vicenza ===
On 9 August 2010 Bastrini was sold to Vicenza Calcio in a co-ownership deal. In June 2011 the deal was renewed. In June 2012 Bastrini and Mattia Mustacchio joined Vicenza outright.

=== Novara ===
On 20 August 2012 Bastrini joined Novara Calcio, with Achille Coser moved to opposite direction. Bastrini signed a 4-year contract. On 1 February 2014, Bastrini joined Serie A side Cagliari on loan for the remainder of 2013–14 season. On 17 July 2014 Bastrini was signed by Ternana in a temporary deal, with an option to buy.

=== Catania ===
On 28 August 2015 Bastrini was signed by Calcio Catania in a temporary deal, with an obligation to sign outright at the end of season. He signed a 1+2-year contract.

=== Cremonese ===
On 18 January 2017 Bastrini was signed by Cremonese.

=== Monopoli ===
On 31 January 2019, he signed with Monopoli.

=== Lecco ===
On 20 September 2019 he joined Lecco.

=== Return to Monopoli ===
On 29 September 2020, he returned to Monopoli on a one-year contract. He was released from his contract on 1 February 2021.

== International career ==
On 5 October 2007 was called up for the first time by Pierluigi Casiraghi for the Italy U-21's in the matches against Croatia and Greece in the qualification for the European Championships in Sweden, however Bastrini was unused in both matches.
