= Dario Maltese (footballer) =

Italian footballer (born 1992)

Personal information
- Date of birth: 29 September 1992 (age 34)
- Place of birth: Palermo, Italy
- Height: 1.80 m (5 ft 11 in)
- Position: Midfielder

Team information
- Current team: Trapani
- Number: 8

Youth career
- Fincantieri Palermo
- 2008–2011: Palermo

Senior career*
Years	Team	Apps	(Gls)
2011–2013	Viareggio	53	(2)
2013–2015	Latina	12	(0)
2014	→ L'Aquila (loan)	9	(1)
2014–2015	→ Reggiana (loan)	27	(2)
2015–2017	Reggiana	56	(0)
2017–2018	Pisa	27	(0)
2018–2019	Alessandria	30	(1)
2019–2021	Giana Erminio	20	(0)
2021–2022	Audace Cerignola	27	(1)
2022	Lamezia Terme	13	(0)
2022–2023	Brindisi	7	(1)
2023–2024	Matera	33	(1)
2024–2025	Nissa	24	(4)
2025–2026	Gela	28	(3)
2026–	Trapani	0	(0)
- * Club domestic league appearances and goals as of 3 May 2026

Dario Maltese (born 29 September 1992) is an Italian footballer who plays as a midfielder for Serie D club Trapani.

== Club career ==
=== Palermo ===
Born in Palermo, Sicily Island, Maltese started his career at Fincantieri Palermo. In summer 2008 he joined U.S. Città di Palermo, a Serie A club from the same city.

=== Viareggio ===
On 1 July 2011 Maltese signed a 2-year professional contract with Palermo. He spent two seasons with Viareggio in a co-ownership deal, for a fee of peppercorn (€500). On 20 June 2013 Palermo bought back Maltese for €45,000.

=== Latina ===
On 9 July 2013 Maltese was signed by Serie B club Latina from Palermo in another co-ownership deal, along with Gianluca Di Chiara (loan). In January 2014 he left for L'Aquila in a temporary deal.

In June 2014 Palermo gave up the remain 50% registration rights of Maltese to Latina.

=== Reggiana ===
On 19 August 2014 Maltese was signed by Lega Pro club Reggiana in a temporary deal, with an option to purchase. On 12 August 2015 Maltese was signed in a 3-year contract.

=== Giana Erminio ===
On 9 October 2019 he joined Serie C club Giana Erminio until the end of the season. On 1 October 2020 he returned to the club for the 2020–21 season.

=== Audace Cerignola ===
On 28 July 2021 he signed for Serie D club Audace Cerignola.

=== Lamezia Terme ===
On 12 July 2022 he signed for Serie D club Lamezia Terme.
