= Edoardo Blondett =

Italian footballer (born 1992)

Personal information
- Date of birth: 7 January 1992 (age 34)
- Place of birth: Genoa, Italy
- Height: 1.85 m (6 ft 1 in)
- Position: Central defender

Team information
- Current team: Fasano
- Number: 24

Youth career
- Sampdoria

Senior career*
Years	Team	Apps	(Gls)
2011–2014	Sampdoria	0	(0)
2011–2012	→ Valenzana (loan)	31	(1)
2012–2013	→ Portogruaro (loan)	7	(0)
2013–2014	→ Cosenza (loan)	26	(1)
2014–2017	Cosenza	90	(3)
2017	Livorno	0	(0)
2017–2018	Catania	19	(0)
2018–2019	Casertana	28	(1)
2019–2020	Reggina	22	(0)
2020–2021	Alessandria	16	(1)
2021	→ Livorno (loan)	16	(0)
2021–2022	Fermana	31	(1)
2022–2023	Cerignola	29	(1)
2023–2025	Sorrento	64	(1)
2025	Reggina	9	(0)
2025–	Fasano	13	(0)

International career
2012	Italy U20	1	(0)
- * Club domestic league appearances and goals as of 15 March 2026

Edoardo Blondett (born 7 January 1992) is an Italian footballer who plays as a defender for Serie D club Fasano.

== Career ==
Born in Genoa, Liguria, Blondett started his professional career at Sampdoria. He played for Giovanissimi U15 team in 2006–07 season to the reserve team from 2009 to 2011. On 26 July 2011 Blondett left for Valenzana in temporary deal.

In summer 2012 goes on loan, from Sampdoria, to Portogruaro.

On 17 August 2013, Blondett was signed by Cosenza, initially in temporary deal. On 10 July 2014 he joined the Serie C club outright, on a three-year deal.

On 2 September 2019, he signed a two-year contract with Reggina.

On 21 September 2020, he joined Alessandria on a two-year contract. On 1 February 2021, he was loaned to Livorno.

On 30 August 2021, he signed a two-year deal with Fermana.

On 16 September 2022, Blondett moved to Cerignola.
