= 2011–12 Juventus FC season =

Italian football club season

Juventus
2011–12 season
- Chairman: Andrea Agnelli
- Head coach: Antonio Conte
- Stadium: Juventus Stadium
- Serie A: 1st
- Coppa Italia: Runners-up
- Top goalscorer: League: Matri (10); All: Marchisio, Matri, and Vučinić (10)
- Highest home attendance: 40,944 vs Atalanta (13 May 2012, Serie A)
- Lowest home attendance: 23,078 vs Bologna (8 December 2011, Coppa Italia)
- Average home league attendance: 38,111
Home colours	Away colours	Third colours

The 2011–12 season was Juventus Football Club's 114th in existence and fifth consecutive season in the top flight of Italian football. In Serie A, the club won their first league title since 2003; they had won two Serie A titles in the meantime (2004–05 and 2005–06) but were stripped of both as a result of the Calciopoli scandal.

== Season review ==
Former club captain and fan favourite Antonio Conte was officially appointed as the new manager on 31 May 2011, taking over the post previously left vacant following the sacking of Luigi Delneri. It was Conte's first appointment at a major Serie A club; he previously managed Siena, Arezzo, Atalanta, and Bari respectively, winning two Serie A promotions in the process (with Bari and Siena). His arrival coincided with the acquisitions of Andrea Pirlo and Arturo Vidal, both top-class midfielders. The 2011–12 season also marked the opening of a new stadium, named Juventus Stadium. It was officially opened on 11 September, in a match against Parma that ended 4–1. First half of league saw Juventus gain several key-wins such as over Milan and Inter, both beaten in the month of October.

Despite criticism for lacking a centre-forward, a role sometimes covered by Matri, the team was able to score regularly with its other players. Juventus reached first place, and the title was certainly won on the penultimate game of the season due to a 2–0 success away to Cagliari – the first time in nine years. Juventus ended the season without any losses, breaking a record for the 20-team league format in Italy. Conte's squad also played the Coppa Italia final, losing to Napoli 2–0 — the first and only seasonal loss. This match was the last for Juventus for Alessandro Del Piero, who seven days before had scored his last goal in a 3–1 win over Atalanta.

After a 3–1 win in the final matchday against Atalanta, Juventus became the first team to go the season unbeaten in the current 38-game format.

== Club ==
=== Coaching staff ===
Position	Staff
Head coach	(Italy) Antonio Conte
Assistant coach	(Italy) Angelo Alessio
Goalkeepers' coach	(Italy) Claudio Filippi
Field assistant	(Italy) Massimo Carrera
Field cooperator	(Italy) Cristian Stellini
Fitness coach	(Italy) Paolo Bertelli

Last updated: July 2011
Source: Juventus.com – Management staff

=== Medical staff ===
Position	Staff
Medical Affairs Coordinator	(Italy) Fabrizio Tencone
Sanitary manager	(Italy) Gianluca Stesina
Doctor	(Italy) Luca Stefanini
Responsible for Youth Sector	(Italy) Antonio Giordano
Masseurs; Physiotherapists	(Italy) Alfonso Casano (Italy) Dario Garbiero (Italy) Marco Luison (Italy) Emanuele Randelli (Italy) Gianluca Scolaro
Chiropractor	(Italy) Elio Cavedoni

Last updated: September 2011
Source: Juventus.com – Medical staff

=== Management ===
Commercial and Marketing Director	(Italy) Francesco Calvo (from 1 October)
Real Estate Director	(Italy) Riccardo Abrate
Communication and External Relations Director	(Italy) Claudio Albanese
Venue Director	(Italy) Francesco Gianello
IT & Technology Director	(Italy) Claudio Leonardi
Human Resources and Organization Director	(Italy) Alessandro Sorbone
Head of Internal Audit	(Italy) Alessandra Borelli
Head of Accounting	(Italy) Alberto Mignone
Head of New Media Communication	(Italy) Federico Palomba
Head of Finance, Planning and Control	(Italy) Marco Re
Head of Marketing	(Italy) Alessandro Sandiano
Stadium Head of Commercial	(United Kingdom) Ben Taverner

Updated to match played May 2012
Source: Juventus.com – Management

=== Sport department ===
Head of Sports	(Italy) Fabio Paratici
General Secretary	(Italy) Maurizio Lombardo
Team Manager	(Italy) Matteo Fabris
Chief Scout	(Italy) Mauro Sandreani
Under 20 Chief Scout	(Spain) Carlos Macias Vargas
Academy Sports Director	(Italy) Giovanni Rossi
Academy Organization Director	(Italy) Gianluca Pessotto
Academy Secretary	(Italy) Alessandro Badii

Updated to match played May 2012
Source: Juventus.com – Sport Department

=== Other information ===
Owner	(Italy) Agnelli family (through Exor S.p.A.)
Chairman	(Italy) Andrea Agnelli
Honorary Chairmen	(Italy) Giampiero Boniperti (Italy) Franzo Grande Stevens
Chief Executive Officer Chief Financial Officer	(Italy) Aldo Mazzia
Sport Dept. CEO General Manager	(Italy) Giuseppe Marotta
Directors	(Italy) Carlo Barel di Sant'Albano (France) Jean-Claude Blanc (until 15 October 2011) (Italy) Michele Briamonte (Italy) Riccardo Montanaro (Czech Republic) Pavel Nedvěd (Italy) Marzio Saà (Italy) Camillo Venesio (Libya) Khaled Fareg Zentuti
Ground (capacity and dimensions)	Juventus Stadium (41,000 / 105x68 meters)

Updated to match played October 2011
Source: Juventus.com – Board of Directors and Committees

== Kit ==
- Supplier: Nike / Sponsor: Betclic (Home kit) / Balocco (Away & Third kit)

Home	Home alt.	Away	Away alt.	Away alt. 2	Third	Third alt.

=== Kit information ===
The kits for the 2011–12 season, made by Nike, were revealed on 6 July 2011 at the new stadium inside the Bianconeri's dressing room. The home kit is a reinterpretation of the traditional black and white stripes in order to guarantee a 3D effect. The away shirt is bright pink, dominated by a large black star. The white away kit used in the previous season is retained as third kit albeit with new shorts and socks design. Official club jersey numbers for the 2011–12 season were presented on 20 August 2011.

== Players ==
=== Squad information ===
Players and squad numbers last updated on 31 January 2012.
Note: Flags indicate national team as has been defined under FIFA eligibility rules. Players may hold more than one non-FIFA nationality.

No.	Name	Nat	Position(s)	Date of birth (Age at end of season)	Signed from	Notes
Goalkeepers
1	Gianluigi Buffon	(Italy)	GK	28 January 1978 (aged 34)	(Italy) Parma	Vice-captain
13	Alex Manninger	(Austria)	GK	4 June 1977 (aged 35)	(Italy) Udinese	
30	Marco Storari	(Italy)	GK	7 January 1977 (aged 35)	(Italy) AC Milan	
Defenders
3	Giorgio Chiellini	(Italy)	CB / LB	14 August 1984 (aged 27)	(Italy) Fiorentina	Vice-captain
4	Martín Cáceres	(Uruguay)	CB / RB	7 April 1987 (aged 25)	(Spain) Sevilla	on loan from Sevilla
6	Fabio Grosso	(Italy)	LB	28 November 1977 (aged 34)	(France) Lyon	
11	Paolo De Ceglie	(Italy)	LB / LWB	17 September 1986 (aged 25)	(Italy) Youth Sector	
15	Andrea Barzagli	(Italy)	CB	8 May 1981 (aged 31)	(Germany) Wolfsburg	
19	Leonardo Bonucci	(Italy)	CB	1 May 1987 (aged 25)	(Italy) Bari	
26	Stephan Lichtsteiner	(Switzerland)	RB / RWB	16 January 1984 (aged 28)	(Italy) Lazio	
Midfielders
7	Simone Pepe	(Italy)	W	30 August 1983 (aged 28)	(Italy) Udinese	
8	Claudio Marchisio	(Italy)	CM	19 January 1986 (aged 26)	(Italy) Youth Sector	
17	Eljero Elia	(Netherlands)	LW	13 February 1987 (aged 25)	(Germany) Hamburg	
20	Simone Padoin	(Italy)	MF	18 March 1984 (aged 28)	(Italy) Atalanta	transferred in from Atalanta
21	Andrea Pirlo	(Italy)	MF	19 May 1979 (aged 33)	(Italy) AC Milan	
22	Arturo Vidal	(Chile)	DM / CM	22 May 1987 (aged 25)	(Germany) Bayer Leverkusen	
24	Emanuele Giaccherini	(Italy)	LW	5 May 1985 (aged 27)	(Italy) Cesena	
27	Miloš Krasić	(Serbia)	RW	1 November 1984 (aged 27)	(Russia) CSKA Moscow	
28	Marcelo Estigarribia	(Paraguay)	LW	21 September 1987 (aged 24)	(Uruguay) Deportivo Maldonado	on loan from Deportivo Maldonado
34	Luca Marrone	(Italy)	MF	28 March 1990 (aged 22)	(Italy) Youth Sector	
Forwards
10	Alessandro Del Piero	(Italy)	SS	9 November 1974 (aged 37)	(Italy) Padova	Captain
14	Mirko Vučinić	(Montenegro)	ST	1 October 1983 (aged 28)	(Italy) Roma	
18	Fabio Quagliarella	(Italy)	ST	31 January 1983 (aged 29)	(Italy) Napoli	
23	Marco Borriello	(Italy)	ST	18 June 1982 (aged 30)	(Italy) Roma	on loan from Roma
32	Alessandro Matri	(Italy)	ST	19 August 1984 (aged 27)	(Italy) Cagliari	
Players transferred during the season
2	Marco Motta	(Italy)	RB	14 May 1986 (aged 26)	(Italy) Udinese	on loan to Catania
5	Michele Pazienza	(Italy)	DM	5 August 1982 (aged 29)	(Italy) Napoli	on loan to Udinese
9	Vincenzo Iaquinta	(Italy)	ST	21 November 1979 (aged 32)	(Italy) Udinese	on loan to Cesena
20	Luca Toni	(Italy)	ST	26 May 1977 (aged 35)	(Italy) Genoa	transferred to Al Nasr
33	Frederik Sørensen	(Denmark)	CB	14 April 1992 (aged 20)	(Denmark) Lyngby	co-ownership with Bologna
38	Amauri	(Italy)	ST	3 June 1980 (aged 32)	(Italy) Palermo	transferred to Fiorentina

== Transfers ==
=== In ===
No.	Pos.	Player	Age	Moving From	Type of Transfer	Ends	Transfer window	Transfer fee	Source
21	MF	(Italy) Andrea Pirlo	32	(Italy) AC Milan	Full ownership	2014	Summer	Free	juventus.com
16	MF	(Switzerland) Reto Ziegler	25	(Italy) Sampdoria	Full ownership	2015	Summer	Free	juventus.com
5	MF	(Italy) Michele Pazienza	28	(Italy) Napoli	Full ownership	2014	Summer	Free	juventus.com
2	DF	(Italy) Marco Motta	25	(Italy) Udinese	Full ownership	2015	Summer	€3.75 M	juventus.com
7	MF	(Italy) Simone Pepe	27	(Italy) Udinese	Full ownership	2015	Summer	€7.5 M	juventus.com
18	FW	(Italy) Fabio Quagliarella	28	(Italy) Napoli	Full ownership	2014	Summer	€10.5 M	juventus.com
32	FW	(Italy) Alessandro Matri	26	(Italy) Cagliari	Full ownership	2015	Summer	€15.5 M	juventus.com
38	FW	(Italy) Amauri	31	(Italy) Parma	Loan expiration	–	Summer	Free	tuttosport.com
–	MF	(Portugal) Tiago	30	(Spain) Atlético Madrid	Loan expiration	–	Summer	Free	
–	MF	(Sweden) Albin Ekdal	21	(Italy) Bologna	Co-ownership termination	2015	Summer	€1.3 M	repubblica.it
–	MF	(Argentina) Sergio Almirón	30	(Italy) Bari	Co-ownership termination	2015	Summer	€1M	calcionline.com
26	DF	(Switzerland) Stephan Lichtsteiner	27	(Italy) Lazio	Full ownership	2015	Summer	€10 M	juventus.com
22	MF	(Chile) Arturo Vidal	24	(Germany) Bayer Leverkusen	Full ownership	2016	Summer	€10.5 M	juventus.com
14	FW	(Montenegro) Mirko Vučinić	27	(Italy) Roma	Full ownership	2015	Summer	€15 M	juventus.com
24	MF	(Italy) Emanuele Giaccherini	26	(Italy) Cesena	Co-ownership	2015	Summer	€3 M	juventus.com
28	MF	(Paraguay) Marcelo Estigarribia	23	(Uruguay) Deportivo Maldonado	Loan	2012	Summer	€0.5 M	juventus.com
17	MF	(Netherlands) Eljero Elia	24	(Germany) Hamburg	Full ownership	2015	Summer	€9 M	juventus.com
23	FW	(Italy) Marco Borriello	29	(Italy) Roma	Loan	2012	Winter	€0.5 M	juventus.com
4	DF	(Uruguay) Martín Cáceres	24	(Spain) Sevilla	Loan	2012	Winter	€1.5 M	juventus.com
20	MF	(Italy) Simone Padoin	27	(Italy) Atalanta	Full ownership	2016	Winter	€4.5 M	juventus.com

=== Out ===
No.	Pos.	Player	Age	Moving to	Type of Transfer	Transfer window	Transfer fee	Source
–	FW	(Italy) Sebastian Giovinco	24	(Italy) Parma	Co-ownership	Summer	€3 M	juventus.com
–	FW	(Italy) Michele Paolucci	25	(Italy) Siena	Co-ownership termination	Summer	Undisclosed	acsiena.it
–	FW	(Italy) Davide Lanzafame	24	(Italy) Palermo	Co-ownership termination	Summer	Free	ilpalermocalcio.it
–	FW	(Italy) Raffaele Palladino	27	(Italy) Parma	Co-ownership termination	Summer	Undisclosed	fcparma.com
14	MF	(Italy) Alberto Aquilani	26	(England) Liverpool	Loan expiration	Summer		
17	DF	(Senegal) Armand Traoré	21	(England) Arsenal	Loan expiration	Summer		
26	DF	(Italy) Leandro Rinaudo	28	(Italy) Napoli	Loan expiration	Summer		
7	MF	(Bosnia and Herzegovina) Hasan Salihamidžić	34	(Germany) VfL Wolfsburg	End of contract	Summer	Free	vfl-wolfsburg.de
–	MF	(Portugal) Tiago	30	(Spain) Atlético Madrid	Released	Summer	Free	juventus.com
4	MF	(Brazil) Felipe Melo	28	(Turkey) Galatasaray	Loan	Summer	€1.5 M	juventus.com
5	MF	(Mali) Mohamed Sissoko	26	(France) Paris Saint-Germain	Full ownership	Summer	€7 M	juventus.com
–	MF	(Sweden) Albin Ekdal	22	(Italy) Cagliari	Co-ownership	Summer	€3 M	juventus.com
–	MF	(Spain) Iago Falque	21	(England) Tottenham Hotspur	Loan	Summer	Free	juventus.com
–	MF	(Argentina) Sergio Almirón	30	(Italy) Catania	Full ownership	Summer	€0.4 M	juventus.com
25	MF	(Uruguay) Jorge Martínez	28	(Italy) Cesena	Loan	Summer	Free	juventus.com
23	DF	(Czech Republic) Zdeněk Grygera	31	(England) Fulham	Released	Summer	Free	juventus.com
36	MF	(Italy) Cristian Pasquato	22	(Italy) Lecce	Loan	Summer	Free	juventus.com
37	MF	(Italy) Manuel Giandonato	19	(Italy) Lecce	Loan	Summer	Free	juventus.com
16	DF	(Switzerland) Reto Ziegler	25	(Turkey) Fenerbahçe	Loan	Summer	€0.6 M	juventus.com
44	GK	(Bulgaria) Mario Kirev	22	(Romania) Politehnica Timișoara	Loan	Summer	Undisclosed	juventus.com
–	MF	(Spain) Iago Falque	21	(England) Tottenham Hotspur	Full ownership	Winter	Undisclosed	juventus.com
33	DF	(Denmark) Frederik Sørensen	19	(Italy) Bologna	Co-ownership	Winter	Undisclosed	juventus.com
38	FW	(Italy) Amauri	31	(Italy) Fiorentina	Full ownership	Winter	€0.5 M	juventus.com
–	MF	(Italy) Cristian Pasquato	22	(Italy) Torino	Loan	Winter	Free	torinofc.it
20	FW	(Italy) Luca Toni	34	(United Arab Emirates) Al Nasr	Full ownership	Winter	Undisclosed	juventus.com
2	DF	(Italy) Marco Motta	25	(Italy) Catania	Loan	Winter	Free	calciocatania.it
5	MF	(Italy) Michele Pazienza	29	(Italy) Udinese	Loan	Winter	Free	juventus.com
9	FW	(Italy) Vincenzo Iaquinta	32	(Italy) Cesena	Loan	Winter	Free	juventus.com
–	FW	(Italy) Ciro Immobile	21	(Italy) Genoa	Co-ownership	Winter	€4 M	juventus.com

== Pre-season and friendlies ==
15 July 2011 Friendly	Juventus	12–1	Rappresentativa Valsusa	Bardonecchia
17:00 CEST (UTC+02:00)	Marchisio 23'; Matri 24', 45', 60' (pen.); Quagliarella 28'; Sørensen 32'; Toni 53', 71'; De Silvestro 62'; Melo 82'; Pepe 89' (pen.), 90'	Report	Barocco 14'	Stadium: Stadio Comunale; Referee: Luca Colosimo

17 July 2011 60-min. Friendly	Juventus	6–1	Lucento	Bardonecchia
15:00 CEST (UTC+02:00)	Pirlo 12'; Matri 16', 30', 41'; Quagliarella 18', 20'	Report	Pavani 8'	Stadium: Stadio Comunale

23 July 2011 World Football; Challenge	Juventus	1–2	Sporting CP	Toronto, Ontario, Canada
19:00 EDT (UTC-04:00)	Toni (yellow card) 77'; Del Piero 79'	Report	Djaló 13', 36'; Hélder Postiga (yellow card) 39'	Stadium: BMO Field; Attendance: 10,028; Referee: Drew Fischer (Canada)

26 July 2011 World Football; Challenge	Juventus	1–0	América	New York City, New York, United States
19:30 EDT (UTC-04v)	Marchisio (yellow card) 27'; Pasquato 41'	Report	Aguilar (yellow card) 35'; Valenzuela (yellow card) 83'	Stadium: Citi Field; Attendance: 20,859; Referee: Jorge Gonzales (United States)

28 July 2011 World Football; Challenge	Juventus	1–0	Guadalajara	Raleigh, North Carolina, United States
20:00 EDT (UTC-04:00)	Quagliarella 12'	Report		Stadium: Carter–Finley Stadium; Attendance: 16,124; Referee: Mark Kadlecik (United States)

5 August 2011 Friendly	Cuneo	0–8	Juventus	Chiusa di Pesio
17:00 CEST (UTC+02:00)		Report	Matri 9'; Marchisio 34'; Vučinić 61'; Pasquato 63'; Toni 74', 78', 82'; Ruggiero 86' (pen.)	Stadium: Stadio Comunale; Attendance: 6,000; Referee: Luca Cassarà

11 August 2011 Friendly	Juventus	4–1	Juventus Primavera	Villar Perosa
17:00 CEST (UTC+02:00)	Pasquato 29'; Iaquinta 74'; Motta 82'; Ziegler 85'	Report	Beltrame 49'	Referee: Andrea Riccardi

13 August 2011 Friendly	Juventus	0–0	Real Betis	Salerno
20:45 CEST (UTC+02:00)		Report		Stadium: Stadio Arechi; Referee: Domenico Celi

18 August 2011 TIM Trophy	Internazionale	1–1 (6–5 p)	Juventus	Bari
20:45 CEST (UTC+02:00)	Ranocchia 16'; Motta (yellow card) 40'; Samuel (yellow card) 42'	Report	Vučinić 9'; Del Piero (yellow card) 40'	Stadium: Stadio San Nicola; Referee: Antonio Damato
	Penalties
	Pazzini (penalty scored); Motta (penalty scored); Pandev (penalty missed); Sneijder (penalty scored); Stanković (penalty scored); Ranocchia (penalty scored); Samuel (penalty scored)		(penalty scored) Del Piero; (penalty missed) Pasquato; (penalty scored) Bonucci; (penalty scored) Vučinić; (penalty scored) Pirlo; (penalty scored) Lichtsteiner; (penalty missed) Barzagli

18 August 2011 TIM Trophy	Milan	1–2	Juventus	Bari
21:45 CEST (UTC+02:00)	Cassano 13'	Report	Vidal 21'; Matri 45+2'	Stadium: Stadio San Nicola; Referee: Antonio Danilo Giannoccaro

21 August 2011 Luigi Berlusconi; Trophy	Milan	2–1	Juventus	Milan
20:45 CEST (UTC+02:00)	Boateng 9'; Seedorf 22'	Report	Bonucci (yellow card) 33'; Vučinić 57'; Marchisio (yellow card) 72'	Stadium: San Siro; Referee: Christian Brighi

8 September 2011 Stadium opening	Juventus	1–1	Notts County	Turin
22:00 CEST (UTC+02:00)	Toni 53'	Report	L. Hughes 87'	Stadium: Juventus Stadium; Attendance: 41,000; Referee: Andrea De Marco

5 January 2012 Friendly	Al-Hilal	1–7	Juventus	Riyadh, Saudi Arabia
17:30 CET (UTC+01:00)	Al-Harthi 48'	Report	Del Piero 14', 23'; Elia 32'; Vidal 45'; Chiellini 51'; Pepe 75'; Quagliarella 86'	Stadium: King Fahd International Stadium; Referee: Abdulrahman Al-Amri ()

== Competitions ==
=== Serie A ===
==== League table ====
Pos	Team	Pld	W	D	L	GF	GA	GD	Pts	Qualification or relegation
1	Juventus (C)	38	23	15	0	68	20	+48	84	Qualification to Champions League group stage
2	Milan	38	24	8	6	74	33	+41	80	Qualification to Champions League group stage
3	Udinese	38	18	10	10	52	35	+17	64	Qualification to Champions League play-off round
4	Lazio	38	18	8	12	56	47	+9	62	Qualification to Europa League play-off round
5	Napoli	38	16	13	9	66	46	+20	61	Qualification to Europa League group stage (Note: Napoli qualified to the group stage of the Europa League as winner of the 2011–12 Coppa Italia. As they finished fifth, the sixth-placed team of the league also qualified for the Europa League.)

Source: Lega Serie A
Rules for classification: 1) points; 2) head-to-head points; 3) head-to-head goal difference; 4) head-to-head goals scored; 5) goal difference; 6) number of goals scored
(C) Champions

==== Results summary ====
Overall								Home						Away					
Pld	W	D	L	GF	GA	GD	Pts	W	D	L	GF	GA	GD	W	D	L	GF	GA	GD
38	23	15	0	68	20	+48	84	13	6	0	40	12	+28	10	9	0	28	8	+20

Last updated: 13 May 2012.
Source: Competitive matches

==== Results by round ====
Round	1	2	3	4	5	6	7	8	9	10	11	12	13	14	15	16	17	18	19	20	21	22	23	24	25	26	27	28	29	30	31	32	33	34	35	36	37	38
Ground	A	H	A	H	A	H	A	H	H	A	A	H	A	H	A	H	A	H	A	H	A	H	A	H	A	H	A	A	H	H	A	H	A	H	A	H	A	H
Result	D	W	W	D	D	W	D	D	W	W	D	W	W	W	D	W	W	D	W	W	D	D	D	W	D	D	D	W	W	W	W	W	W	W	W	D	W	W
Position	2	1	2	2	1	1	1	3	1	1	1	1	1	1	1	1	2	1	1	1	2	1	2	2	2	2	2	2	2	2	1	1	1	1	1	1	1	1

Updated to match(es) played on 13 May 2012. Source: Competitive matches
A = Away; H = Home; W = Win; D = Draw; L = Loss

==== Matches ====
11 September 2011 2	Juventus	4–1	Parma	Turin
12:30 CEST (UTC+02:00)	Lichtsteiner 16'; Pepe 58'; Vidal 73'; Marchisio 83'; Giaccherini (yellow card) 89'; De Ceglie (red card) 90+1'	Report	Lucarelli (yellow card) 46'; Giovinco 90+2' (pen.)	Stadium: Juventus Stadium; Attendance: 35,920; Referee: Domenico Celi

18 September 2011 3	Siena	0–1	Juventus	Siena
15:00 CEST (UTC+02:00)	Del Grosso (yellow card) 34'; Terzi (yellow card) 90+2'	Report	Matri 54'	Stadium: Stadio Artemio Franchi – Montepaschi Arena; Attendance: 15,265; Referee: Paolo Valeri

21 September 2011 4	Juventus	1–1	Bologna	Turin
20:45 CEST (UTC+02:00)	Pepe (yellow card) 13'; Vučinić 29', (yellow card) 24' (yellow-red card) 45+2'; Lichtsteiner (yellow card) 72'; Bonucci (yellow card) 90+5'	Report	Kone (yellow card) 29'; Pérez (yellow card) 42'; Portanova 52', (yellow card) 90+5'; Casarini (yellow card) 58'; Pulzetti (yellow card) 64'	Stadium: Juventus Stadium; Attendance: 35,679; Referee: Gabriele Gava

25 September 2011 5	Catania	1–1	Juventus	Catania
15:00 CEST (UTC+02:00)	Bergessio 21'; Almirón (yellow card) 52'; Capuano (yellow card) 60'	Report	Marchisio (yellow card) 16'; Chiellini (yellow card) 25'; Krasić 49'; Vidal (yellow card) 74'	Stadium: Stadio Angelo Massimino; Attendance: 20,839; Referee: Paolo Mazzoleni

2 October 2011 6	Juventus	2–0	Milan	Turin
20:45 CEST (UTC+02:00)	Pirlo (yellow card) 63'; Marchisio 87', 90+3'	Report	Nesta (yellow card) 52'; Boateng (yellow card) 39' (yellow-red card) 89'	Stadium: Juventus Stadium; Attendance: 37,281; Referee: Nicola Rizzoli

16 October 2011 7	Chievo	0–0	Juventus	Verona
15:00 CEST (UTC+02:00)	Théréau (yellow card) 20'; Morero (yellow card) 27'; Sammarco (yellow card) 55'; Bradley (yellow card) 71'; Mandelli (yellow card) 85'; Cesar (yellow card) 90+5'	Report	Pepe (yellow card) 88'; Chiellini (yellow card) 90+6'	Stadium: Stadio Marc'Antonio Bentegodi; Attendance: 22,000; Referee: Andrea De Marco

22 October 2011 8	Juventus	2–2	Genoa	Turin
20:45 CEST (UTC+02:00)	Matri 6', 58'; Pirlo (yellow card) 39'; Marchisio (yellow card) 90+4'	Report	Seymour (yellow card) 4'; Mesto (yellow card) 7'; Palacio (yellow card) 29'; Rossi 31'; Dainelli (yellow card) 46'; Caracciolo 85'; Veloso (yellow card) 90+4'	Stadium: Juventus Stadium; Attendance: 36,618; Referee: Andrea Romeo

25 October 2011 9	Juventus	2–1	Fiorentina	Turin
20:45 CEST (UTC+02:00)	Bonucci 13'; Matri 65'; Marchisio (yellow card) 84'	Report	Jovetić 57'; Behrami (yellow card) 68'; Munari (yellow card) 76'; Natali (yellow card) 90+2'	Stadium: Juventus Stadium; Attendance: 35,517; Referee: Daniele Orsato

29 October 2011 10	Internazionale	1–2	Juventus	Milan
20:45 CEST (UTC+02:00)	Maicon 28'; Chivu (yellow card) 59'; Sneijder (yellow card) 65'	Report	Vučinić 12'; Bonucci (yellow card) 22'; Marchisio 33'; Vidal (yellow card) 45'; Chiellini (yellow card) 54'; Pepe (yellow card) 55'; Pirlo (yellow card) 67'	Stadium: San Siro; Attendance: 78,072; Referee: Nicola Rizzoli

20 November 2011 12	Juventus	3–0	Palermo	Turin
15:00 CET (UTC+01:00)	Pepe 20'; Matri 48'; Marchisio 65'	Report	Balzaretti (yellow card) 46'; Pisano (yellow card) 86'	Stadium: Juventus Stadium; Attendance: 36,489; Referee: Mauro Bergonzi

26 November 2011 13	Lazio	0–1	Juventus	Rome
20:45 CET (UTC+01:00)	Ledesma (yellow card) 67'; Sculli (yellow card) 79'	Report	Pepe 34'; Marchisio (yellow card) 55'	Stadium: Stadio Olimpico; Attendance: 57,148; Referee: Gianluca Rocchi

29 November 2011 11	Napoli	3–3	Juventus	Naples
20:45 CET (UTC+01:00)	Pandev (yellow card) 16', (goal) 40', 68'; Hamšík 22', (yellow card) 43'; Maggio (yellow card) 19'	Report	Pirlo (yellow card) 14'; Bonucci (yellow card) 37'; Matri (yellow card) 40', (goal) 48'; Lichtsteiner (yellow card) 43'; Vidal (yellow card) 58'; Estigarribia 72'; Pepe 79'	Stadium: Stadio San Paolo; Attendance: 57,402; Referee: Paolo Tagliavento
Note: The match was initially scheduled on 6 November but was postponed to 29 November because of bad weather conditions in Campania.

4 December 2011 14	Juventus	2–0	Cesena	Turin
15:00 CET (UTC+01:00)	Marchisio 72'; Vidal 83' (pen.)	Report	Ghezzal (yellow card) 15'; Rossi (yellow card) 28'; Antonioli (red card) 82'	Stadium: Juventus Stadium; Attendance: 39,544; Referee: Daniele Doveri

12 December 2011 15	Roma	1–1	Juventus	Rome
20:45 CET (UTC+01:00)	De Rossi 5', (yellow card) 90+1'; Pjanić (yellow card) 52'; Totti (penalty missed) 64'; Greco (yellow card) 66'	Report	Chiellini 61'; Vidal (yellow card) 62'; Bonucci (yellow card) 67'; Quagliarella (yellow card) 69'	Stadium: Stadio Olimpico; Attendance: 49,547; Referee: Daniele Orsato

18 December 2011 16	Juventus	2–0	Novara	Turin
15:00 CET (UTC+01:00)	Pepe 4'; Giaccherini (yellow card) 60'; Quagliarella 75'	Report	Marianini (yellow card) 44'; Centurioni (yellow card) 52'	Stadium: Juventus Stadium; Attendance: 39,836; Referee: Andrea Gervasoni

21 December 2011 1	Udinese	0–0	Juventus	Udine
18:00 CET (UTC+01:00)	Basta (yellow card) 40'; Pinzi (yellow card) 42'; Isla (yellow card) 49'	Report	Vidal (yellow card) 43'	Stadium: Stadio Friuli; Attendance: 28,588; Referee: Paolo Tagliavento
Note: The start of the Serie A season was postponed from its scheduled start (27–28 August) to a future date because of a strike declared by the Italian Footballers' Association. The round was later rescheduled for 21 December.

8 January 2012 17	Lecce	0–1	Juventus	Lecce
15:00 CET (UTC+01:00)	Oddo (yellow card) 39'; Olivera (yellow card) 52'; Cuadrado (yellow card) 68'	Report	Matri 27'; Vidal (yellow card) 52'; Chiellini (yellow card) 64'	Stadium: Stadio Via del Mare; Attendance: 23,298; Referee: Mauro Bergonzi

15 January 2012 18	Juventus	1–1	Cagliari	Turin
15:00 CET (UTC+01:00)	Vučinić 7'; Matri (yellow card) 50'; Barzagli (yellow card) 73'	Report	Cossu (yellow card) 38', (goal) 48'; Dessena (yellow card) 90+1'	Stadium: Juventus Stadium; Attendance: 38,293; Referee: Marco Guida

21 January 2012 19	Atalanta	0–2	Juventus	Bergamo
20:45 CET (UTC+01:00)	Raimondi (yellow card) 45'; Marilungo (yellow card) 67'	Report	Lichtsteiner (yellow card) 51', (goal) 54'; Giaccherini 81'	Stadium: Stadio Atleti Azzurri d'Italia; Attendance: 22,335; Referee: Domenico Celi

28 January 2012 20	Juventus	2–1	Udinese	Turin
20:45 CET (UTC+01:00)	Vidal (yellow card) 25'; Giaccherini (yellow card) 34'; Matri 42', 62'	Report	Fernandes (yellow card) 19'; Ferronetti (yellow card) 51'; Floro Flores 56'; Armero (yellow card) 89'; Di Natale (yellow card) 90+2'	Stadium: Juventus Stadium; Attendance: 39,265; Referee: Paolo Valeri

5 February 2012 22	Juventus	0–0	Siena	Turin
15:00 CET (UTC+01:00)	Barzagli (yellow card) 74'; Borriello (yellow card) 84'; Chiellini (yellow card) 90+3'	Report	Pegolo (yellow card) 72'; Parravicini (yellow card) 90+4'	Stadium: Juventus Stadium; Attendance: 35,392; Referee: Sebastiano Peruzzo

15 February 2012 21	Parma	0–0	Juventus	Parma
18:30 CET (UTC+01:00)	Zaccardo (yellow card) 21'	Report	Bonucci (yellow card) 77'; Vidal (yellow card) 90+1'; Quagliarella (yellow card) 90+3'	Stadium: Stadio Ennio Tardini; Attendance: 17,200; Referee: Paolo Mazzoleni
Note: Postponed from 31 January to 15 February because of snow.

18 February 2012 24	Juventus	3–1	Catania	Turin
20:45 CET (UTC+01:00)	Pirlo 22'; Marchisio (yellow card) 57'; Chiellini 74'; Vučinić (yellow card) 78'; Quagliarella 81'	Report	Barrientos 4'; Motta (yellow card) 52' (yellow-red card) 65'; Almirón (yellow card) 67'; Legrottaglie (yellow card) 90+3'	Stadium: Juventus Stadium; Attendance: 36,270; Referee: Christian Brighi

25 February 2012 25	Milan	1–1	Juventus	Milan
20:45 CET (UTC+01:00)	Nocerino 14'; Thiago Silva (yellow card) 36'; Mexès (yellow card) 80'; Muntari (yellow card) 81'	Report	Barzagli (yellow card) 41'; Matri 83', (yellow card) 84'; Vidal (red card) 89'; Pepe (yellow card) 90+1'	Stadium: San Siro; Attendance: 79,208; Referee: Paolo Tagliavento

3 March 2012 26	Juventus	1–1	Chievo	Turin
20:45 CET (UTC+01:00)	De Ceglie 18'	Report	Dramé (yellow card) 48', (goal) 76'	Stadium: Juventus Stadium; Attendance: 39,027; Referee: Andrea Gervasoni

7 March 2012 23	Bologna	1–1	Juventus	Bologna
18:30 CET (UTC+01:00)	Di Vaio 17'; Pérez (yellow card) 60'; Ramírez (yellow card) 68'; Portanova (yellow card) 85'	Report	Pirlo (yellow card) 34'; Vučinić 58'; Bonucci (yellow card) 20' (yellow-red card) 84'; Vidal (yellow card) 90'	Stadium: Stadio Renato Dall'Ara; Attendance: 30,321; Referee: Luca Banti
Note: Postponed from 12 February to 7 March because of snow.

11 March 2012 27	Genoa	0–0	Juventus	Genoa
15:00 CET (UTC+01:00)	Kucka (yellow card) 19'; Janković (yellow card) 59'; Moretti (yellow card) 67'	Report	Pepe (yellow card) 37'; De Ceglie (yellow card) 40'	Stadium: Stadio Luigi Ferraris; Attendance: 27,527; Referee: Nicola Rizzoli

17 March 2012 28	Fiorentina	0–5	Juventus	Florence
20:45 CET (UTC+01:00)	Cerci (red card) 21'; Olivera (yellow card) 34'	Report	Vučinić 15'; Lichtsteiner (yellow card) 24'; Vidal 27'; Marchisio 54'; Pirlo 67'; Padoin 72'	Stadium: Stadio Artemio Franchi; Attendance: 36,387; Referee: Mauro Bergonzi

25 March 2012 29	Juventus	2–0	Internazionale	Turin
20:45 CEST (UTC+02:00)	Cáceres 57'; Del Piero 71'; De Ceglie (yellow card) 75'	Report	Nagatomo (yellow card) 34'; Poli (yellow card) 45'	Stadium: Juventus Stadium; Attendance: 40,102; Referee: Andrea De Marco

1 April 2012 30	Juventus	3–0	Napoli	Turin
20:45 CEST (UTC+02:00)	Lichtsteiner (yellow card) 37'; Vidal (yellow card) 39', (goal) 75'; De Ceglie (yellow card) 45+1'; Vučinić 53'; Marchisio (yellow card) 73'; Quagliarella 83'	Report	Gargano (yellow card) 63'; Cannavaro (yellow card) 68'; Zúñiga (red card) 86'	Stadium: Juventus Stadium; Attendance: 40,742; Referee: Daniele Orsato

7 April 2012 31	Palermo	0–2	Juventus	Palermo
18:30 CEST (UTC+02:00)		Report	Bonucci 56'; Quagliarella 69'; Marchisio (yellow card) 77'	Stadium: Stadio Renzo Barbera; Attendance: 28,941; Referee: Christian Brighi

11 April 2012 32	Juventus	2–1	Lazio	Turin
20:45 CEST (UTC+02:00)	Pepe 30'; Lichtsteiner (yellow card) 47'; Chiellini (yellow card) 50'; Quagliarella (yellow card) 56'; Del Piero 82'	Report	Diakité (yellow card) 12'; Biava (yellow card) 35'; Mauri 45', (yellow card) 54'; Ledesma (yellow card) 81'; Kozák (yellow card) 80' (yellow-red card) 90+3'	Stadium: Juventus Stadium; Attendance: 38,664; Referee: Antonio Damato

22 April 2012 34	Juventus	4–0	Roma	Turin
20:45 CEST (UTC+02:00)	Vidal 4', 8'; Pirlo 29'; Quagliarella (yellow card) 32'; Marchisio 52'	Report	Stekelenburg (red card) 27'; Bojan (yellow card) 85'	Stadium: Juventus Stadium; Attendance: 39,542; Referee: Mauro Bergonzi

25 April 2012 33	Cesena	0–1	Juventus	Cesena
18:00 CEST (UTC+02:00)	Colucci (yellow card) 8'; Rennella (yellow card) 43'; Guana (yellow card) 64'; Moras (yellow card) 90+1'	Report	Vidal (yellow card) 33'; Pirlo (yellow card) 57'; Matri (yellow card) 62'; Borriello 79'	Stadium: Stadio Dino Manuzzi; Attendance: 23,343; Referee: Marco Guida
Note: All the fixtures of the 14–15 April weekend were postponed due to Piermario Morosini's death and rescheduled to 24–25 April.

29 April 2012 35	Novara	0–4	Juventus	Novara
15:00 CEST (UTC+02:00)	Pesce (yellow card) 59'	Report	Vučinić 16', 64'; Borriello 40'; Vidal 50'	Stadium: Stadio Silvio Piola; Attendance: 17,649; Referee: Domenico Celi

2 May 2012 36	Juventus	1–1	Lecce	Turin
20:45 CEST (UTC+02:00)	Marchisio 8'; Bonucci (yellow card) 64'	Report	Carrozzieri (yellow card) 45'; Obodo (yellow card) 50'; Cuadrado (yellow card) 20' (yellow-red card) 54'; Muriel (yellow card) 82'; Delvecchio (yellow card) 83'; Bertolacci 85'	Stadium: Juventus Stadium; Attendance: 38,978; Referee: Paolo Valeri

6 May 2012 37	Cagliari	0–2	Juventus	Trieste
20:45 CEST (UTC+02:00)	Nainggolan (yellow card) 17'; Pisano (yellow card) 40'; Cossu (yellow card) 52'	Report	Vučinić 6'; Vidal (yellow card) 9'; Chiellini (yellow card) 48'; Pepe (yellow card) 54'; Canini 74' (o.g.)	Stadium: Stadio Nereo Rocco; Attendance: 18,000; Referee: Daniele Orsato

13 May 2012 38	Juventus	3–1	Atalanta	Turin
15:00 CEST (UTC+02:00)	Marrone 10'; Del Piero 28'; Barzagli 90+1' (pen.)	Report	Lichtsteiner 83' (o.g.)	Stadium: Juventus Stadium; Attendance: 40,944; Referee: Gabriele Gava

=== Coppa Italia ===
Juventus started the Coppa Italia directly in the round of 16, as one of the eight best seeded teams.

8 December 2011 Round of 16	Juventus	2–1 (a.e.t.)	Bologna	Turin
21:00 CET (UTC+01:00)	Bonucci (yellow card) 55'; Giaccherini 90'; Pazienza (yellow card) 90+5'; Marchisio 102'		Taïder (yellow card) 9'; Raggi (yellow card) 58', (goal) 90+6'; Loria (yellow card) 62'; Acquafresca (yellow card) 90+5'	Stadium: Juventus Stadium; Attendance: 23,078; Referee: Sebastiano Peruzzo

24 January 2012 Quarter-finals	Juventus	3–0	Roma	Turin
20:45 CET (UTC+01:00)	Giaccherini 6'; Estigarribia (yellow card) 9'; Del Piero 30'; Barzagli (yellow card) 32'; Krasić (yellow card) 89'; Kjær 90' (o.g.)		Pjanić (yellow card) 38'; Simplício (yellow card) 66'; Lamela (red card) 68'; Totti (yellow card) 71'	Stadium: Juventus Stadium; Attendance: 38,498; Referee: Luca Banti

8 February 2012 Semi-finals; First leg	Milan	1–2	Juventus	Milan
20:45 CET (UTC+01:00)	Ambrosini (yellow card) 43'; Mexès (yellow card) 47'; El Shaarawy 62'		Cáceres 53', 83'; Quagliarella (yellow card) 73'	Stadium: San Siro; Attendance: 31,384; Referee: Paolo Mazzoleni

20 March 2012 Semi-finals; Second leg	Juventus	2–2 (a.e.t.) (4–3 agg.)	Milan	Turin
20:45 CET (UTC+01:00)	Del Piero 28'; Vučinić (yellow card) 39', (goal) 96'; Borriello (yellow card) 80'; Storari (yellow card) 85'; Vidal (yellow card) 112'		Muntari (yellow card) 16'; Aquilani (yellow card) 35'; Mesbah 51'; Seedorf (yellow card) 56'; Inzaghi (yellow card) 80'; Maxi López 81'; Thiago Silva (yellow card) 101'; Mexès (yellow card) 110'	Stadium: Juventus Stadium; Attendance: 40,045; Referee: Daniele Orsato

20 May 2012 Final	Juventus	0–2	Napoli	Rome
21:00 CEST (UTC+02:00)	Marchisio (yellow card) 40'; Storari (yellow card) 62'; Borriello (yellow card) 63'; Quagliarella (red card) 90'		Džemaili (yellow card) 54'; Cannavaro (yellow card) 55'; Cavani 63' (pen.); De Sanctis (yellow card) 80'; Hamšík 83'	Stadium: Stadio Olimpico; Attendance: 61,803; Referee: Christian Brighi

== Statistics ==
	Total	Home	Away	Neutral
Games played	43	22	20	1
Games won	26	15	11	0
Games drawn	16	7	9	0
Games lost	1	0	0	1
Biggest win	5–0 v Fiorentina	4–0 v Roma	5–0 v Fiorentina	n/a
Biggest loss	0–2 v Napoli	n/a	n/a	0–2 v Napoli
Biggest win (League)	5–0 v Fiorentina	4–0 v Roma	5–0 v Fiorentina	–
Biggest win (Cup)	3–0 v Roma	3–0 v Roma	2–1 v AC Milan	n/a
Biggest loss (League)	n/a	n/a	n/a	–
Biggest loss (Cup)	0–2 v Napoli	n/a	n/a	0–2 v Napoli
Clean sheets	21	8	13	0
Goals scored	77	47	30	0
Goals conceded	26	15	9	2
Goal difference	+51	+32	+21	-2
Average GF per game	1.83	2.14	1.5	0
Average GA per game	0.57	0.68	0.45	2
Yellow cards	82	37	42	3
Red cards	5	2	2	1
Most appearances	Pirlo (41)	Barzagli (21)	Pirlo (20)	14 players (1)
Top scorer	Marchisio; Matri; Vučinić (10)	Marchisio (8)	Vučinić (6)	n/a
Worst discipline	Vidal 13 (yellow card) 1 (red card)	Marchisio 4 (yellow card)	Vidal 10 (yellow card) 1 (red card)	Quagliarella 1 (red card)
Penalties for	2/4 (50%)	2/3 (66.67%)	0/1 (0%)	0/0
Penalties against	2/4 (50%)	1/1 (100%)	0/2 (0%)	1/1 (100%)
League points	84/114 (73.68%)	45/57 (78.95%)	39/57 (68.42%)	–
Winning rate	60.47%	68.18%	55%	0%

Last updated: 20 May 2012
Source: Competitive matches

=== Appearances, goals, and disciplinary record ===
No.	Pos.	Player	L App	L	L (yellow card)	L (red card)	C App	C	C (yellow card)	C (red card)	T App	T	T (yellow card)	T (red card)
1	GK	(Italy) Gianluigi Buffon	35	-16	0	0	0	0	0	0	35	-16	0	0
2	DF	(Italy) Marco Motta	0	0	0	0	0	0	0	0	0	0	0	0
3	DF	(Italy) Giorgio Chiellini	34	2	7	0	3	0	0	0	37	2	7	0
4	DF	(Uruguay) Martín Cáceres	11	1	0	0	3	2	0	0	14	3	0	0
5	MF	(Italy) Michele Pazienza	8	0	0	0	1	0	1	0	9	0	1	0
6	DF	(Italy) Fabio Grosso	2	0	0	0	0	0	0	0	2	0	0	0
7	MF	(Italy) Simone Pepe	31	6	6	0	2	0	0	0	33	6	6	0
8	MF	(Italy) Claudio Marchisio	36	9	7	0	3	1	1	0	39	10	8	0
9	FW	(Italy) Vincenzo Iaquinta	0	0	0	0	0	0	0	0	0	0	0	0
10	FW	(Italy) Alessandro Del Piero	23	3	0	0	5	2	0	0	28	5	0	0
11	DF	(Italy) Paolo De Ceglie	21	1	3	1	2	0	0	0	23	1	3	1
13	GK	(Austria) Alex Manninger	0	0	0	0	0	0	0	0	0	0	0	0
14	FW	(Montenegro) Mirko Vučinić	32	9	1	1	3	1	1	0	35	10	2	1
15	DF	(Italy) Andrea Barzagli	35	1	3	0	4	0	1	0	39	1	4	0
17	MF	(Netherlands) Eljero Elia	4	0	0	0	1	0	0	0	5	0	0	0
18	FW	(Italy) Fabio Quagliarella	23	4	4	0	4	0	1	1	27	4	5	1
19	DF	(Italy) Leonardo Bonucci	32	2	6	1	5	0	1	0	37	2	7	1
20	FW	(Italy) Luca Toni	0	0	0	0	0	0	0	0	0	0	0	0
20	MF	(Italy) Simone Padoin	6	1	0	0	1	0	0	0	7	1	0	0
21	MF	(Italy) Andrea Pirlo	37	3	6	0	4	0	0	0	41	3	6	0
22	MF	(Chile) Arturo Vidal	33	7	12	1	2	0	1	0	35	7	13	1
23	FW	(Italy) Marco Borriello	13	2	1	0	4	0	2	0	17	2	3	0
24	MF	(Italy) Emanuele Giaccherini	23	1	3	0	4	2	0	0	27	3	3	0
26	DF	(Switzerland) Stephan Lichtsteiner	36	2	6	0	3	0	0	0	39	2	6	0
27	MF	(Serbia) Miloš Krasić	7	1	0	0	2	0	1	0	9	1	1	0
28	MF	(Paraguay) Marcelo Estigarribia	14	1	0	0	4	0	1	0	18	1	1	0
30	GK	(Italy) Marco Storari	3	-4	0	0	5	-6	1	0	8	-10	1	0
32	FW	(Italy) Alessandro Matri	31	10	4	0	1	0	0	0	32	10	4	0
33	DF	(Denmark) Frederik Sørensen	0	0	0	0	1	0	0	0	1	0	0	0
34	MF	(Italy) Luca Marrone	3	1	0	0	3	0	0	0	6	1	0	0
38	FW	(Italy) Amauri	0	0	0	0	0	0	0	0	0	0	0	0
		Own goals for	-	1	-	-	-	1	-	-	-	2	-	-

Last updated: 20 May 2012
Source: Competitive matches

=== Goalscorers ===
Rank	No.	Pos	Nat	Name	Serie A	Coppa Italia	Total
1	8	MF	(Italy)	Claudio Marchisio	9	1	10
1	14	FW	(Montenegro)	Mirko Vučinić	9	1	10
1	32	FW	(Italy)	Alessandro Matri	10	0	10
4	22	MF	(Chile)	Arturo Vidal	7	0	7
5	7	MF	(Italy)	Simone Pepe	6	0	6
6	10	FW	(Italy)	Alessandro Del Piero	3	2	5
7	18	FW	(Italy)	Fabio Quagliarella	4	0	4
8	4	DF	(Uruguay)	Martín Cáceres	1	2	3
8	21	MF	(Italy)	Andrea Pirlo	3	0	3
8	24	MF	(Italy)	Emanuele Giaccherini	1	2	3
11	3	DF	(Italy)	Giorgio Chiellini	2	0	2
11	19	DF	(Italy)	Leonardo Bonucci	2	0	2
11	23	FW	(Italy)	Marco Borriello	2	0	2
11	26	DF	(Switzerland)	Stephan Lichtsteiner	2	0	2
15	11	DF	(Italy)	Paolo De Ceglie	1	0	1
15	15	DF	(Italy)	Andrea Barzagli	1	0	1
15	20	MF	(Italy)	Simone Padoin	1	0	1
15	27	MF	(Serbia)	Miloš Krasić	1	0	1
15	28	MF	(Paraguay)	Marcelo Estigarribia	1	0	1
15	34	MF	(Italy)	Luca Marrone	1	0	1
Own goal					1	1	2
Totals					68	9	77

Last updated: 20 May 2012

== See also ==
- List of unbeaten football club seasons
