= 2010–11 Juventus FC season =

Italian football club season

Juventus
2010–11 season
- Chairman: Andrea Agnelli
- Head coach: Luigi Delneri
- Stadium: Stadio Olimpico di Torino
- Serie A: 7th
- Coppa Italia: Quarter-finals
- UEFA Europa League: Group stage
- Top goalscorer: League: Fabio Quagliarella, Alessandro Matri (9); All: Alessandro Del Piero (11)
- Highest home attendance: 24,908 vs AC Milan (5 March 2011, Serie A)
- Lowest home attendance: 6,992 vs Manchester City (16 December 2010, Europa League)
- Average home league attendance: 21,966
Home colours	Away colours	Third colours

The 2010–11 season was Juventus Football Club's 113th in existence and fourth consecutive season in the top-flight of Italian football. Juventus started the season with a new chairman, Andrea Agnelli and a new coach, Luigi Delneri.

== Club ==
=== Coaching staff ===
Position	Staff
Head coach	(Italy) Luigi Delneri
Assistant coach	(Italy) Francesco Conti
Field assistant	(Italy) Maurizio D'Angelo
Goalkeepers' coach	(Italy) Claudio Filippi
Fitness training manager	(Italy) Roberto De Bellis
Fitness coach	(Italy) Luca Alimonta

Last updated: January 2011
Source: Juventus.com – Management staff

=== Medical staff ===
Position	Staff
Chief of Medical Staff	(Italy) Fabrizio Tencone
Doctor	(Italy) Luca Stefanini
Masseurs; Physiotherapists	(Italy) Alfonso Casano (Italy) Dario Garbiero (Italy) Marco Luison (Italy) Emanuele Randelli (Italy) Gianluca Scolaro
Chiropractor	(Italy) Franco Cento
Sanitary manager	(Italy) Gianluca Stesina
Responsible for Youth Section	(Italy) Antonio Giordano

Last updated: May 2011
Source: Juventus.com – Medical staff

=== Management ===
Chief Financial Officer	(Italy) Michele Bergero (until 28 February 2011) (Italy) Aldo Mazzia (since 1 April 2011)
Human Resources and Organization Director	(Italy) Alessandro Sorbone
Communication and External Relations Director	(Italy) Claudio Albanese
Real Estate Director	(Italy) Riccardo Abrate
Venue Director	(Italy) Francesco Gianello
Head of Information Technology	(Italy) Claudio Leonardi
Head of Marketing	(Italy) Alessandro Sandiano
Head of Internal Audit	(Italy) Alessandra Borelli

Updated to match played May 2011
Source: Juventus.com – Management

=== Sport department ===
Technical Dept. Coordinator	(Italy) Fabio Paratici
Youth Dept. Manager	(Italy) Giovanni Rossi
Youth Dept. Organizational Manager	(Italy) Gianluca Pessotto
First Team's Scouts Dept. Chief	(Italy) Mauro Sandreani
Under 20 Scouts' Dept. Chief	(Spain) Carlos Macias Vargas
Sports Dept. Secretary-General	(Italy) Francesco Gianello
Team Manager	(Italy) Matteo Fabris
Sports Dept. Secretary	(Italy) Alessandro Badii

Updated to match played January 2011
Source: Juventus.com – Sport Department

=== Other information ===
Owner	(Italy) Agnelli family (through Exor S.p.A.)
Chairman	(Italy) Andrea Agnelli
Honorary Chairmen	(Italy) Giampiero Boniperti (Italy) Franzo Grande Stevens
Chief Executive Officer General Manager	(France) Jean-Claude Blanc (until 11 May) (Italy) Aldo Mazzia (from 11 May)
Sport Dept. CEO General Manager	(Italy) Giuseppe Marotta
Directors	(Italy) Carlo Barel di Sant'Albano (France) Jean-Claude Blanc (Italy) Michele Briamonte (Italy) Riccardo Montanaro (Czech Republic) Pavel Nedvěd (Italy) Marzio Saà (Italy) Camillo Venesio (Libya) Khaled Fareg Zentuti
Ground (capacity and dimensions)	Stadio Olimpico (28,000 / 105x68 meters)

Updated to match played May 2011
Source: Juventus.com – Board of Directors and Committees

== Kit ==
The kits for the 2010–11 season were revealed on 2 July 2010 bearing the BetClic logo. The home kit is traditional white and black stripes reinterpreted by Nike through a zigzag motif. The same motif is also present on the away kit, which has two green and red stripes on white background imitating flag of Italy. In October 2010 Balocco became the official sponsor for the away jersey in league matches. The previous season away kit is used as third kit.

== Players ==
=== Squad information ===
No.	Name	Nationality	Position	Birth date and age	Signed from	Notes
Goalkeepers
1	Gianluigi Buffon	(Italy)	GK	28 January 1978 (aged 33)	Parma	Vice-captain
13	Alex Manninger	(Austria)	GK	4 June 1977 (aged 34)	Udinese	
30	Marco Storari	(Italy)	GK	7 January 1977 (aged 34)	AC Milan	(Note: Marco Storari wore shirt number 32 in Europa League Third qualifying round against Shamrock Rovers and in the Play-off round against Sturm Graz. He changed his shirt number to 30 before the start of Serie A.)
31	Marco Costantino	(Italy)	GK	17 May 1991 (aged 20)	Youth programme	
Defenders
2	Marco Motta	(Italy)	RB	14 May 1986 (aged 25)	Udinese	on loan from Udinese
3	Giorgio Chiellini	(Italy)	CB	14 August 1984 (aged 26)	Fiorentina	Vice-captain
6	Fabio Grosso	(Italy)	LB	28 November 1977 (aged 33)	(France) Lyon	
15	Andrea Barzagli	(Italy)	CB	8 May 1981 (aged 30)	(Germany) VfL Wolfsburg	Winter transfer
17	Armand Traoré	(France)	LB	8 October 1989 (aged 21)	(England) Arsenal	on loan from Arsenal
19	Leonardo Bonucci	(Italy)	CB	1 May 1987 (aged 24)	Bari	
21	Zdeněk Grygera	(Czech Republic)	RB	14 May 1980 (aged 31)	(Netherlands) Ajax	
26	Leandro Rinaudo	(Italy)	CB	9 May 1983 (aged 28)	Napoli	on loan from Napoli
29	Paolo De Ceglie	(Italy)	LB	17 September 1986 (aged 24)	Youth programme	
34	Vittorio Ferrero	(Italy)	CB	30 June 1991 (aged 20)	Youth programme	
39	Vincenzo Camilleri	(Italy)	DF	6 March 1992 (aged 19)	Reggina	on loan from Reggina
43	Frederik Sørensen	(Denmark)	CB	14 April 1992 (aged 19)	(Denmark) Lyngby BK	on loan from Lyngby BK
Midfielders
4	Felipe Melo	(Brazil)	DM	26 June 1983 (aged 28)	Fiorentina	
5	Mohamed Sissoko	(Mali)	DM	22 January 1985 (aged 26)	(England) Liverpool	
7	Hasan Salihamidžić	(Bosnia and Herzegovina)	RW	1 January 1977 (aged 34)	(Germany) Bayern Munich	
8	Claudio Marchisio	(Italy)	CM	19 January 1986 (aged 25)	Youth programme	
14	Alberto Aquilani	(Italy)	CM	7 July 1984 (aged 26)	(England) Liverpool	on loan from Liverpool
23	Simone Pepe	(Italy)	WI	30 August 1983 (aged 27)	Udinese	on loan from Udinese
25	Jorge Martínez	(Uruguay)	LW	5 April 1983 (aged 28)	Catania	
27	Miloš Krasić	(Serbia)	RW	1 November 1984 (aged 26)	(Russia) CSKA Moscow	
35	Marcel Büchel	(Austria)	MF	18 March 1991 (aged 20)	Siena	on loan from Siena
36	Manuel Giandonato	(Italy)	MF	10 October 1991 (aged 19)	Youth programme	
37	Filippo Boniperti	(Italy)	MF	27 September 1991 (aged 19)	Youth programme	
40	Leonardo Spinazzola	(Italy)	MF	25 March 1993 (aged 18)	Siena	on loan from Siena
42	Elio De Silvestro	(Italy)	MF	10 March 1993 (aged 18)	Youth programme	
45	Nicolò Corticchia	(Italy)	MF	11 February 1993 (aged 18)	Youth programme	
46	Matteo Liviero	(Italy)	DM	13 April 1993 (aged 18)	Youth programme	
Forwards
9	Vincenzo Iaquinta	(Italy)	ST	21 November 1979 (aged 31)	Udinese	
10	Alessandro Del Piero	(Italy)	SS	9 November 1974 (aged 36)	Padova	Captain
18	Fabio Quagliarella	(Italy)	ST	31 January 1983 (aged 28)	Napoli	on loan from Napoli
20	Luca Toni	(Italy)	ST	26 May 1977 (aged 34)	Genoa	Winter transfer
32	Alessandro Matri	(Italy)	ST	19 August 1984 (aged 26)	Cagliari	on loan from Cagliari
38	Alberto Libertazzi	(Italy)	ST	1 January 1992 (aged 19)	Youth programme	
41	Niccolò Giannetti	(Italy)	ST	12 May 1992 (aged 19)	Siena	on loan from Siena
Players transferred during the season
11	Amauri	(Italy)	ST	3 June 1980 (aged 31)	Palermo	on loan to Parma
17	David Trezeguet	(France)	ST	15 October 1977 (aged 33)	(France) Monaco	transferred to Hércules
20	Davide Lanzafame	(Italy)	LW	9 February 1987 (aged 24)	Palermo	on loan to Brescia
27	Albin Ekdal	(Sweden)	AM	28 July 1989 (aged 21)	(Sweden) Brommapojkarna	co-ownership with Bologna
28	Diego	(Brazil)	AM	28 February 1985 (aged 26)	(Germany) Werder Bremen	transferred to VfL Wolfsburg
33	Nicola Legrottaglie	(Italy)	CB	20 October 1976 (aged 34)	Chievo	transferred to AC Milan
45	Andrea De Paola	(Italy)	CB	2 October 1990 (aged 20)	Youth programme	on loan to Viareggio

=== UEFA Europa League squad ===
As of 31 January 2011

Note: Flags indicate national team as defined under FIFA eligibility rules; some limited exceptions apply. Players may hold more than one non-FIFA nationality.

No.	Pos.	Nation	Player
2	DF	ITA	Marco Motta
3	DF	ITA	Giorgio Chiellini
4	MF	BRA	Felipe Melo
5	MF	MLI	Mohamed Sissoko
8	MF	ITA	Claudio Marchisio
9	FW	ITA	Vincenzo Iaquinta
10	FW	ITA	Alessandro Del Piero (Captain)
11	FW	ITA	Amauri
13	GK	AUT	Alexander Manninger
17	DF	FRA	Armand Traoré
19	DF	ITA	Leonardo Bonucci
20	FW	ITA	Davide Lanzafame
21	DF	CZE	Zdeněk Grygera
23	MF	ITA	Simone Pepe
25	MF	URU	Jorge Martínez
26	DF	ITA	Leandro Rinaudo
27	MF	SRB	Miloš Krasić

No.	Pos.	Nation	Player
29	DF	ITA	Paolo De Ceglie
30	GK	ITA	Marco Storari
31	GK	ITA	Marco Costantino
33	DF	ITA	Nicola Legrottaglie
34	DF	ITA	Vittorio Ferrero (List B Player)
35	MF	AUT	Marcel Büchel
36	MF	ITA	Manuel Giandonato (List B Player)
37	MF	ITA	Filippo Boniperti (List B Player)
38	FW	ITA	Alberto Libertazzi (List B Player)
39	DF	ITA	Vincenzo Camilleri
40	MF	ITA	Leonardo Spinazzola
41	FW	ITA	Niccolò Giannetti
42	MF	ITA	Elio De Silvestro (List B Player)
45	DF	ITA	Andrea De Paola (List B Player)
46	DF	ITA	Matteo Liviero (List B Player)
47	GK	ITA	Gianluca Di Salvia (List B Player)
48	GK	ITA	Manfredi Sclopis (List B Player)

== Transfers ==
=== In ===
No.	Pos.	Player	Age	Moving From	Type of Transfer	Ends	Transfer window	Transfer fee	Source
23	MF	(Italy) Simone Pepe	26	(Italy) Udinese	Loan (permanent option)	2011	Summer	€2.6 million	Juventus.com
30	GK	(Italy) Marco Storari	33	(Italy) AC Milan	Full ownership	2013	Summer	€4.5 million	Juventus.com
20	FW	(Italy) Davide Lanzafame	23	(Italy) Palermo	Loan	2011	Summer	Undisclosed	ilpalermocalcio.it
27	MF	(Sweden) Albin Ekdal	20	(Italy) Siena	Loan ended	–	Summer	Free	
30	MF	(Portugal) Tiago	29	(Spain) Atlético Madrid	Loan ended	–	Summer	Free	
24	FW	(Italy) Cristian Pasquato	21	(Italy) Triestina	Loan ended	–	Summer	Free	
19	DF	(Italy) Leonardo Bonucci	23	(Italy) Bari	Full ownership	2015	Summer	€15.5 million	Juventus.com
25	FW	(Uruguay) Jorge Andrés Martínez	27	(Italy) Catania	Full ownership	2014	Summer	€12 million	Juventus.com
31	GK	(Italy) Marco Costantino	19	(Italy) SPAL	Full ownership		Summer	€100,000	
2	DF	(Italy) Marco Motta	24	(Italy) Udinese	Loan (permanent option)	2011	Summer	€1.25 million	Juventus.com
27	MF	(Serbia) Miloš Krasić	25	(Russia) CSKA Moscow	Full ownership	2014	Summer	€15 million	Juventus.com
14	MF	(Italy) Alberto Aquilani	26	(England) Liverpool	Loan (permanent option)	2011	Summer	Free	Juventus.com
18	FW	(Italy) Fabio Quagliarella	27	(Italy) Napoli	Loan (permanent option)	2011	Summer	€4.5 million	Juventus.com
43	DF	(Denmark) Frederik Sørensen	18	(Denmark) Lyngby BK	Loan	2011	Summer	Free	goal.com
39	DF	(Italy) Vincenzo Camilleri	18	(Italy) Reggina	Loan	2011	Summer	Free	
26	DF	(Italy) Leandro Rinaudo	27	(Italy) Napoli	Loan (permanent option)	2011	Summer	€600,000	Juventus.com
17	DF	(France) Armand Traoré	20	(England) Arsenal	Loan	2011	Summer	€500,000	Juventus.com
20	FW	(Italy) Luca Toni	33	(Italy) Genoa	Full ownership	2012	Winter	Free	Juventus.com
15	DF	(Italy) Andrea Barzagli	29	(Germany) VfL Wolfsburg	Full ownership	2013	Winter	€300,000	Juventus.com
32	FW	(Italy) Alessandro Matri	26	(Italy) Cagliari	Loan (permanent option)	2011	Winter	€2.5 million plus Ariaudo	Juventus.com

Total spending: ▼€59.35 million

=== Out ===
No.	Pos.	Player	Age	Moving to	Type of Transfer	Transfer window	Transfer fee	Source
19	DF	(Italy) Cristian Molinaro	26	(Germany) VfB Stuttgart	Full ownership	Summer	€3.9 million	Juventus.com
5	DF	(Italy) Fabio Cannavaro	36	(United Arab Emirates) Al-Ahli	Free agent	Summer	Free	alahliclub.ae
–	DF	(Italy) Domenico Criscito	23	(Italy) Genoa	Co-ownership Termination	Summer	€6 million	Juventus.com
2	DF	(Uruguay) Martín Cáceres	23	(Spain) Barcelona	Loan ended	Summer	Free	
26	MF	(Italy) Antonio Candreva	23	(Italy) Udinese	Loan ended	Summer	Free	
27	FW	(Italy) Michele Paolucci	24	(Italy) Siena	Loan ended	Summer	Free	
23	DF	(Italy) Lorenzo Ariaudo	21	(Italy) Cagliari	Co-ownership	Summer	€1.3 million	Cagliaricalcio.net
–	DF	(Argentina) Sergio Almirón	29	(Italy) Bari	Co-ownership	Summer	€2.5 million	Juventus.com
12	GK	(Italy) Antonio Chimenti	40	None	Retired	Summer	Free	
40	FW	(Italy) Ciro Immobile	20	(Italy) Siena	Loan	Summer	Free	ACSiena.it
39	MF	(Italy) Luca Marrone	20	(Italy) Siena	Loan	Summer	Undisclosed	ACSiena.it
35	MF	(Italy) Simone Esposito	20	(Italy) Ascoli	Co-ownership	Summer	€600,000	AscoliCalcio.net
37	MF	(Italy) Fausto Rossi	19	(Italy) Vicenza	Loan	Summer	Undisclosed	VicenzaCalcio.com
32	MF	(Spain) Iago Falque	20	(Spain) Villarreal B	Loan	Summer	Free	villarrealcf.es
14	MF	(Italy) Sebastian Giovinco	23	(Italy) Parma	Loan	Summer	€1 million	Juventus.com
24	MF	(Italy) Cristian Pasquato	21	(Italy) Modena	Loan	Summer	Free	ModenaFC.net
18	MF	(Denmark) Christian Poulsen	30	(England) Liverpool	Full ownership	Summer	€5.475 million	Juventus.com
27	MF	(Sweden) Albin Ekdal	21	(Italy) Bologna	Co-ownership	Summer	€2.4 million	Juventus.com
30	MF	(Portugal) Tiago	29	(Spain) Atlético Madrid	Loan	Summer	€500,000	clubatleticodemadrid.com
28	FW	(Brazil) Diego	25	(Germany) VfL Wolfsburg	Full Ownership	Summer	€15.5 million	Juventus.com
17	FW	(France) David Trezeguet	32	(Spain) Hércules	Released	Summer	Free	Juventus.com
15	DF	(France) Jonathan Zebina	31	(Italy) Brescia	Mutual consent	Summer	Free	Juventus.com
16	MF	(Italy) Mauro Camoranesi	33	(Germany) VfB Stuttgart	Mutual consent	Summer	Free	Juventus.com
20	MF	(Italy) Davide Lanzafame	23	(Italy) Brescia	Loan	Winter	Free	Juventus.com
45	MF	(Italy) Andrea De Paola	20	(Italy) Viareggio	Loan	Winter	Free	
33	DF	(Italy) Nicola Legrottaglie	34	(Italy) AC Milan	Full ownership	Winter	Free	Juventus.com
11	FW	(Italy) Amauri	30	(Italy) Parma	Loan	Winter	Free	Juventus.com
–	DF	(Italy) Lorenzo Ariaudo	21	(Italy) Cagliari	Co-ownership Termination	Winter	€2.5 million	Juventus.com

Total income: ▲€41.675 million.

== Pre-season and friendlies ==
11 July 2010 Friendly	Rappresentativa Dilettanti Trentino	0–6	Juventus	Pinzolo
16:00 CEST		Report	16' Diego; 19' Pasquato; 29', 36' Trezeguet; 48' Grosso; 62' Grygera	Stadium: Stadio Pineta; Referee: Tommaso Battaglia

15 July 2010 Friendly	Juventus	5–0	Al-Nassr	Rovereto
17:00 CEST	Amauri 45'; Diego (penalty missed) 48'; Trezeguet 53', 79', 82'; Pasquato 70'	Report		Stadium: Stadio Quercia; Referee: Francesco Borriello

18 July 2010 Friendly	Hamburg	0–0	Juventus	Lübeck
18:30 CEST	Rincón (yellow card) 25'	Report	Legrottaglie (yellow card) 19'	Stadium: Lohmühle Stadion; Referee: Peter Gaggelmann (Germany)

24 July 2010 Friendly	Juventus	2–1	Lyon	Cosenza
20:45 CEST	Del Piero 38' (pen.); Lanzafame (yellow card) 41'; Pepe 74'	Report	22' (pen.) Ederson; (red card) 26' Cissokho	Stadium: Stadio San Vito; Referee: Carmine Russo

13 August 2010 TIM Trophy	Internazionale	1–0	Juventus	Bari
20:45 CEST	Sneijder 25'	Report		Stadium: Stadio San Nicola; Referee: Domenico Celi

13 August 2010 TIM Trophy	AC Milan	1–1 (4–2 p)	Juventus	Bari
21:45 CEST	Gattuso (yellow card) 12'; Ronaldinho 21'	Report	33' Diego; (yellow card) 40' De Ceglie	Stadium: Stadio San Nicola; Referee: Antonio Danilo Giannoccaro
	Penalties
	Ronaldinho (penalty scored); Borriello (penalty scored); Pirlo (penalty scored); Nesta (penalty scored)		(penalty scored) Trezeguet; (penalty scored) Diego; (penalty missed) Pepe; (penalty missed) Amauri

22 August 2010 Trofeo Luigi Berlusconi	AC Milan	0–0 (4–5 p)	Juventus	Milan
21:00 CEST	Flamini (yellow card) 87'	Report		Stadium: San Siro; Referee: Andrea Romeo
	Penalties
	Ronaldinho (penalty scored); Silva (penalty missed); Bonera (penalty scored); Inzaghi (penalty scored); Huntelaar (penalty scored)		(penalty scored) Pepe; (penalty scored) Bonucci; (penalty scored) Lanzafame; (penalty scored) Diego; (penalty scored) Motta

24 August 2010 Friendly	Juventus	5–1	Juventus Primavera	Piedmont
17:00 CEST	Martínez 20'; Diego 29'; Motta 55'; Libertazzi 80', 90'	Report	47' Bianconi	Stadium: Villar Perosa; Referee: Ludovico Ruffinengo

24 May 2011 Gary Neville's testimonial match	Manchester United	1–2	Juventus	Manchester
20:45 CEST	Rooney 19'	Report	40' Pepe; 78' Giandonato	Stadium: Old Trafford; Referee: Mark Halsey (England)

== Competitions ==
=== Serie A ===
==== League table ====
Pos	Team	Pld	W	D	L	GF	GA	GD	Pts	Qualification or relegation
5	Lazio	38	20	6	12	55	39	+16	66 (Note: Udinese finished ahead of Lazio on head-to-head away goals scored: Udinese 2–1 Lazio, Lazio 3–2 Udinese.)	Qualification to Europa League play-off round (Note: As Internazionale won the 2010–11 Coppa Italia and already qualified for the Champions League, Palermo entered the 2011–12 UEFA Europa League third qualification round as the cup runners-up.)
6	Roma	38	18	9	11	59	52	+7	63	Qualification to Europa League play-off round
7	Juventus	38	15	13	10	57	47	+10	58	
8	Palermo	38	17	5	16	58	63	−5	56	Qualification to Europa League third qualifying round
9	Fiorentina	38	12	15	11	49	44	+5	51 (Note: Fiorentina finished ahead of Genoa on head-to-head points: Fiorentina 1–0 Genoa, Genoa 1–1 Fiorentina.)	

Source: Lega Serie A
Rules for classification: 1) points; 2) head-to-head points; 3) head-to-head goal difference; 4) head-to-head goals scored; 5) goal difference; 6) number of goals scored.

==== Results summary ====
Overall								Home						Away					
Pld	W	D	L	GF	GA	GD	Pts	W	D	L	GF	GA	GD	W	D	L	GF	GA	GD
38	15	13	10	57	47	+10	58	8	6	5	35	31	+4	7	7	5	22	16	+6

Last updated: 22 May 2011.
Source: Competitive matches

==== Results by round ====
Round	1	2	3	4	5	6	7	8	9	10	11	12	13	14	15	16	17	18	19	20	21	22	23	24	25	26	27	28	29	30	31	32	33	34	35	36	37	38
Ground	A	H	A	H	H	A	H	A	A	H	A	H	A	H	A	H	A	H	A	H	A	H	A	A	H	A	H	H	A	H	A	H	A	H	A	H	A	H
Result	L	D	W	L	W	D	W	D	W	W	D	D	W	D	W	W	D	L	L	W	D	L	L	W	W	L	L	L	D	W	W	W	D	D	W	D	L	D
Position	16	15	9	15	9	7	5	5	4	4	5	4	4	3	3	2	4	5	6	5	6	7	8	8	6	6	7	7	7	7	7	7	7	7	7	7	7	7

Updated to match(es) played on 22 May 2011. Source: Competitive matches
A = Away; H = Home; W = Win; D = Draw; L = Loss

==== Matches ====
29 August 2010 1	Bari	1–0	Juventus	Bari
18:00 CEST (UTC+02:00)	Donati 43'; Belmonte (yellow card) 90+2'	Report	Marchisio (yellow card) 45'; Bonucci (yellow card) 88'	Stadium: Stadio San Nicola; Attendance: 45,162; Referee: Luca Banti

12 September 2010 2	Juventus	3–3	Sampdoria	Turin
15:00 CEST (UTC+02:00)	Marchisio 43'; Pepe 50'; Quagliarella 67'; Melo (yellow card) 88'	Report	Pozzi 36', 73'; Cassano 64'	Stadium: Stadio Olimpico di Torino; Attendance: 23,949; Referee: Paolo Mazzoleni

19 September 2010 3	Udinese	0–4	Juventus	Udine
15:00 CEST (UTC+02:00)		Report	Coda 18' (o.g.); Quagliarella 24'; Pepe (yellow card) 29'; Marchisio (yellow card) 35', (goal) 43'; Melo (yellow card) 41'; Iaquinta 77', (yellow card) 78'	Stadium: Stadio Friuli; Attendance: 20,767; Referee: Mauro Bergonzi

23 September 2010 4	Juventus	1–3	Palermo	Turin
20:45 CEST (UTC+02:00)	Marchisio (yellow card) 20'; Iaquinta 87'	Report	Pastore 2'; Bovo (yellow card) 18', (goal) 85'; Bačinovič (yellow card) 52'; Iličić 62', (yellow card) 89'; Sirigu (yellow card) 80'	Stadium: Stadio Olimpico di Torino; Attendance: 20,607; Referee: Daniele Orsato

26 September 2010 5	Juventus	4–2	Cagliari	Turin
20:45 CEST (UTC+02:00)	Krasić 13', 34', 70', (yellow card) 71'; Rinaudo (yellow card) 36'; Nainggolan 57' (o.g.); Sissoko (yellow card) 85'	Report	Matri 20', 80'; Agostini (yellow card) 36'	Stadium: Stadio Olimpico di Torino; Attendance: 19,594; Referee: Christian Brighi

3 October 2010 6	Internazionale	0–0	Juventus	Milan
20:45 CEST (UTC+02:00)	Chivu (yellow card) 35'	Report	Bonucci (yellow card) 16'; Motta (yellow card) 64'	Stadium: San Siro; Attendance: 78,883; Referee: Luca Banti

17 October 2010 7	Juventus	4–0	Lecce	Turin
15:00 CEST (UTC+02:00)	Aquilani 13'; Melo 34' (pen.); Quagliarella 44'; Del Piero 82'	Report	Mesbah (yellow card) 17'; Olivera (yellow card) 25'; Fabiano (yellow card) 45+1'; Ferrario (yellow card) 60'; Grossmüller (yellow card) 90+2'	Stadium: Stadio Olimpico di Torino; Attendance: 23,373; Referee: Gabriele Gava

24 October 2010 8	Bologna	0–0	Juventus	Bologna
15:00 CEST (UTC+02:00)	Garics (yellow card) 10'; Portanova (yellow card) 84'; Mutarelli (yellow card) 90+6'	Report	Motta (yellow card) 11'	Stadium: Stadio Renato Dall'Ara; Attendance: 28,785; Referee: Andrea De Marco

31 October 2010 9	AC Milan	1–2	Juventus	Milan
20:45 CEST (UTC+02:00)	Boateng (yellow card) 39'; Pirlo (yellow card) 45'; Ibrahimović 82'	Report	Quagliarella 24'; Melo (yellow card) 36'; Pepe (yellow card) 52'; Del Piero 65'	Stadium: San Siro; Attendance: 76,768; Referee: Gianluca Rocchi

7 November 2010 10	Juventus	3–1	Cesena	Turin
15:00 CET (UTC+01:00)	Motta (yellow card) 4'; Del Piero 31' (pen.); Quagliarella 43'; Sissoko (yellow card) 45+3'; Iaquinta 87'	Report	Jiménez 11'; Appiah (yellow card) 37'; Pellegrino (yellow card) 30' (yellow-red card) 41'; Bogdani (yellow card) 45+3'	Stadium: Stadio Olimpico di Torino; Attendance: 20,534; Referee: Andrea Romeo

10 November 2010 11	Brescia	1–1	Juventus	Brescia
20:45 CET (UTC+01:00)	Diamanti 73'; Caracciolo (yellow card) 75'; Berardi (yellow card) 83'	Report	Pepe (yellow card) 37'; Motta (yellow card) 67'; Quagliarella 71'; Grosso (yellow card) 89'	Stadium: Stadio Mario Rigamonti; Attendance: 16,000; Referee: Antonio Damato

14 November 2010 12	Juventus	1–1	Roma	Turin
20:45 CET (UTC+01:00)	Iaquinta 35'; Pepe (yellow card) 45+2'	Report	Ménez (yellow card) 1'; Totti 45+5' (pen.); Greco (yellow card) 54'; N. Burdisso (yellow card) 84'	Stadium: Stadio Olimpico di Torino; Attendance: 23,869; Referee: Nicola Rizzoli

21 November 2010 13	Genoa	0–2	Juventus	Genoa
12:30 CET (UTC+01:00)	Criscito (yellow card) 15'; Toni (yellow card) 33'; Kaladze (yellow card) 34'; Rafinha (yellow card) 65'; Milanetto (yellow card) 87'	Report	Eduardo 18' (o.g.); Krasić 23', (yellow card) 24'; Grosso (yellow card) 63'	Stadium: Stadio Luigi Ferraris; Attendance: 30,000; Referee: Emidio Morganti

28 November 2010 14	Juventus	1–1	Fiorentina	Turin
20:45 CET (UTC+01:00)	Bonucci (yellow card) 44'; Pepe 82', (yellow card) 90+5'; Marchisio (yellow card) 90+2'	Report	Motta 4' (o.g.); Pasqual (yellow card) 63'; Felipe (yellow card) 80' (yellow-red card) 88'; Comotto (yellow card) 82'	Stadium: Stadio Olimpico di Torino; Attendance: 21,740; Referee: Paolo Valeri

5 December 2010 15	Catania	1–3	Juventus	Catania
20:45 CET (UTC+01:00)	Morimoto 37'	Report	Pepe 35'; Quagliarella 44', 58'; Storari (yellow card) 78'	Stadium: Stadio Angelo Massimino; Attendance: 19,689; Referee: Antonio Damato

12 December 2010 16	Juventus	2–1	Lazio	Turin
20:45 CET (UTC+01:00)	Chiellini 2'; Melo (yellow card) 62'; Muslera 90+4' (o.g.)	Report	Zárate 14'; Brocchi (yellow card) 53'; Cavanda (yellow card) 90+2'	Stadium: Stadio Olimpico di Torino; Attendance: 20,098; Referee: Paolo Tagliavento

19 December 2010 17	Chievo	1–1	Juventus	Turin
15:00 CET (UTC+01:00)	Mandelli (yellow card) 45'; Cesar (yellow card) 50'; Fernandes (yellow card) 62'; Mantovani (yellow card) 81'; Pellissier 90+3'	Report	Chiellini (yellow card) 15'; Quagliarella 31'; Giandonato (red card) 52'; Bonucci (yellow card) 56'	Stadium: Stadio Olimpico di Torino; Attendance: 22,819; Referee: Mauro Bergonzi

6 January 2011 18	Juventus	1–4	Parma	Turin
12:30 CET (UTC+01:00)	Melo (red card) 17'; Legrottaglie 60'	Report	Giovinco 41', 48'; Zaccardo (yellow card) 45+2'; Paletta (yellow card) 58'; Crespo 62' (pen.); Palladino 90+3'	Stadium: Stadio Olimpico di Torino; Attendance: 23,873; Referee: Andrea De Marco

9 January 2011 19	Napoli	3–0	Juventus	Naples
20:45 CET (UTC+01:00)	Cavani 20', 26', 53'; Dossena (yellow card) 45'; Hamšík (yellow card) 55'; Maggio (yellow card) 57'	Report	Traoré (yellow card) 41'; Pepe (yellow card) 60'	Stadium: Stadio San Paolo; Attendance: 60,000; Referee: Emidio Morganti

16 January 2011 20	Juventus	2–1	Bari	Turin
15:00 CET (UTC+01:00)	Del Piero 43'; Sørensen (yellow card) 51'; Aquilani 79'; Grygera (yellow card) 90+5'	Report	Donati (yellow card) 39'; Rudolf 57'; Castillo (yellow card) 90+1'	Stadium: Stadio Olimpico di Torino; Attendance: 18,882; Referee: Christian Brighi

23 January 2011 21	Sampdoria	0–0	Juventus	Genoa
15:00 CET (UTC+01:00)	Guberti (yellow card) 63'; Mannini (yellow card) 87'	Report	Motta (yellow card) 23'; Pepe (yellow card) 34'; Chiellini (yellow card) 51'; Sissoko (yellow card) 74'; Marchisio (yellow card) 85'	Stadium: Stadio Luigi Ferraris; Attendance: 25,933; Referee: Paolo Valeri

30 January 2011 22	Juventus	1–2	Udinese	Turin
20:45 CET (UTC+01:00)	Martínez (yellow card) 31'; Marchisio 60'; Grosso (yellow card) 74'; Bonucci (red card) 87'	Report	Zapata 67'; Abdi (yellow card) 80'; Sánchez 85', (yellow card) 27' (yellow-red card) 88'	Stadium: Stadio Olimpico di Torino; Attendance: 17,953; Referee: Antonio Danilo Giannoccaro

2 February 2011 23	Palermo	2–1	Juventus	Palermo
20:45 CET (UTC+01:00)	Miccoli 7'; Migliaccio 20'; Kasami (yellow card) 90+3'	Report	Marchisio (yellow card) 34', (goal) 36'; Melo (yellow card) 39'	Stadium: Stadio Renzo Barbera; Attendance: 25,972; Referee: Emidio Morganti

5 February 2011 24	Cagliari	1–3	Juventus	Cagliari
20:45 CET (UTC+01:00)	Conti (yellow card) 18'; Biondini (yellow card) 45'; Acquafresca 51'; Ariaudo (yellow card) 53'	Report	Krasić (yellow card) 5'; Matri 20', 75'; Bonucci (yellow card) 45+2'; Aquilani (yellow card) 57'; Toni 84'	Stadium: Stadio Sant'Elia; Attendance: 23,000; Referee: Gianluca Rocchi

13 February 2011 25	Juventus	1–0	Internazionale	Turin
20:45 CET (UTC+01:00)	Matri 30'; Sissoko (yellow card) 79'	Report	Maicon (yellow card) 87'; Motta (yellow card) 90+3'	Stadium: Stadio Olimpico di Torino; Attendance: 24,485; Referee: Paolo Valeri

20 February 2011 26	Lecce	2–0	Juventus	Lecce
12:30 CET (UTC+01:00)	Mesbah 32', (yellow card) 34'; Bertolacci 48'; Vives (yellow card) 67' (yellow-red card) 69'	Report	Buffon (red card) 12'	Stadium: Stadio Via del Mare; Attendance: 20,380; Referee: Paolo Mazzoleni

26 February 2011 27	Juventus	0–2	Bologna	Turin
20:45 CET (UTC+01:00)	Pepe (yellow card) 87'	Report	Di Vaio 49', 66'; Mutarelli (yellow card) 64'; Britos (yellow card) 72'	Stadium: Stadio Olimpico di Torino; Attendance: 20,843; Referee: Andrea Romeo

5 March 2011 28	Juventus	0–1	AC Milan	Turin
20:45 CET (UTC+01:00)		Report	Van Bommel (yellow card) 44'; Gattuso (yellow card) 46', (goal) 68'; Ibrahimović (yellow card) 90+4'	Stadium: Stadio Olimpico di Torino; Attendance: 24,908; Referee: Nicola Rizzoli

12 March 2011 29	Cesena	2–2	Juventus	Cesena
20:45 CET (UTC+01:00)	Jiménez (yellow card) 27', (goal) 41' (pen.); Lauro (yellow card) 64'; Parolo 80'	Report	Matri 19', 35'; Buffon (yellow card) 39'; Motta (yellow card) 21' (yellow-red card) 43'; Bonucci (yellow card) 56'; Aquilani (yellow card) 75'	Stadium: Stadio Dino Manuzzi; Attendance: 21,932; Referee: Mauro Bergonzi

20 March 2011 30	Juventus	2–1	Brescia	Turin
15:00 CET (UTC+01:00)	Krasić 23'; Del Piero 67'	Report	Éder 42'; Mareco (yellow card) 28' (yellow-red card) 71'	Stadium: Stadio Olimpico di Torino; Attendance: 19,162; Referee: Domenico Celi

3 April 2011 31	Roma	0–2	Juventus	Rome
20:45 CEST (UTC+02:00)	Pizarro (yellow card) 32'	Report	Grosso (yellow card) 77'; Krasić 59'; Marchisio (yellow card) 66'; Matri 74'	Stadium: Stadio Olimpico; Attendance: 55,000; Referee: Gianluca Rocchi

10 April 2011 32	Juventus	3–2	Genoa	Turin
12:30 CEST (UTC+02:00)	Rossi 50' (o.g.); Motta (yellow card) 53'; Matri 63'; Bonucci (yellow card) 70'; Toni 83'; Storari (yellow card) 89'	Report	Bonucci 7' (o.g.); Floro Flores 57', (yellow card) 57'; Dainelli (yellow card) 77'	Stadium: Stadio Olimpico di Torino; Attendance: 23,137; Referee: Marco Guida

17 April 2011 33	Fiorentina	0–0	Juventus	Florence
15:00 CEST (UTC+02:00)		Report	Sørensen (yellow card) 62'	Stadium: Stadio Artemio Franchi; Attendance: 34,483; Referee: Daniele Orsato

23 April 2011 34	Juventus	2–2	Catania	Turin
21:00 CEST (UTC+02:00)	Motta (yellow card) 1'; Del Piero 19' (pen.), 38'; Grosso (yellow card) 63'; Melo (yellow card) 90+5'	Report	Spolli (yellow card) 32'; Silvestre (yellow card) 42'; Ledesma (yellow card) 45'; Gómez 81'; Carboni (yellow card) 90+1'; Lodi 90+5'	Stadium: Stadio Olimpico di Torino; Attendance: 23,411; Referee: Mauro Bergonzi

2 May 2011 35	Lazio	0–1	Juventus	Rome
20:45 CEST (UTC+02:00)	Ledesma (yellow card) 37' (yellow-red card) 81'	Report	Grosso (yellow card) 23'; Pepe (yellow card) 58', (goal) 87'; Salihamidžić (yellow card) 72'	Stadium: Stadio Olimpico; Attendance: 51,876; Referee: Paolo Mazzoleni

9 May 2011 36	Juventus	2–2	Chievo	Turin
20:45 CEST (UTC+02:00)	Del Piero 13' (pen.); Marchisio (yellow card) 37'; Aquilani (yellow card) 53'; Matri 55'; Krasić (yellow card) 72'	Report	Andreolli (yellow card) 12'; Rigoni (yellow card) 26'; Uribe 68'; Sardo 69'	Stadium: Stadio Olimpico di Torino; Attendance: 23,740; Referee: Andrea Gervasoni

15 May 2011 37	Parma	1–0	Juventus	Parma
15:00 CEST (UTC+02:00)	Džemaili (yellow card) 39'; Morrone (yellow card) 45'; Giovinco 64'	Report	Motta (yellow card) 42'; Salihamidžić (yellow card) 85'	Stadium: Stadio Ennio Tardini; Attendance: 17,259; Referee: Sebastiano Peruzzo

22 May 2011 38	Juventus	2–2	Napoli	Turin
20:45 CEST (UTC+02:00)	Chiellini (yellow card) 26', (goal) 47'; Marchisio (yellow card) 57'; Barzagli (yellow card) 82'; Matri 84'	Report	Maggio 22'; Ruiz (yellow card) 44'; Mascara (yellow card) 60'; Gargano (yellow card) 66'; Lucarelli 70'	Stadium: Stadio Olimpico di Torino; Attendance: 23,389; Referee: Nicola Rizzoli

=== Coppa Italia ===
13 January 2011 Round of 16	Juventus	2–0	Catania	Turin
21:00 CET	Krasić 35'; Pepe 54'; Marchisio (yellow card) 67'	Report	Silvestre (yellow card) 62'; Spolli (yellow card) 88'	Stadium: Stadio Olimpico di Torino; Attendance: 11,934; Referee: Carmine Russo

27 January 2011 Quarter-finals	Juventus	0–2	Roma	Turin
20:45 CET	Motta (yellow card) 30'	Report	Mexès (yellow card) 23'; Vučinić 65'; Taddei 90+1'	Stadium: Stadio Olimpico di Torino; Attendance: 18,300; Referee: Antonio Damato

=== UEFA Europa League ===
==== Third qualifying round ====
29 July 2010 First leg	Shamrock Rovers (Republic of Ireland)	0–2	(Italy) Juventus	Dublin, Ireland
20:45 CEST (UTC+02:00)	Bayly (yellow card) 64'	Report	Amauri 3', 75'; Pepe (yellow card) 43'; Marchisio (yellow card) 70'	Stadium: Tallaght Stadium; Attendance: 5,700; Referee: David Fernández Borbalán (Spain)

5 August 2010 Second leg	Juventus (Italy)	1–0 (3–0 agg.)	(Republic of Ireland) Shamrock Rovers	Modena, (Note: The change of location was due to a concert held by U2, scheduled at Stadio Olimpico di Torino on the following day."u2.com – U2 360° Tour Leg 2".) Italy
20:45 CEST (UTC+02:00)	Lanzafame (yellow card) 71'; Del Piero 74'	Report	Dennehy (yellow card) 42'; Bradley (yellow card) 45'; Flynn (yellow card) 58'	Stadium: Stadio Alberto Braglia; Attendance: 18,000; Referee: Georgios Daloukas (Greece)

==== Play-off round ====
19 August 2010 First leg	Sturm Graz (Austria)	1–2	(Italy) Juventus	Graz, Austria
21:05 CEST (UTC+02:00)	Schildenfeld 82'	Report	Bonucci 16'; Marchisio (yellow card) 31'; Chiellini (yellow card) 38'; Amauri 90+1'	Stadium: UPC-Arena; Attendance: 15,322; Referee: Cüneyt Çakır (Turkey)

26 August 2010 Second leg	Juventus (Italy)	1–0 (3–1 agg.)	(Austria) Sturm Graz	Turin, Italy
20:45 CEST (UTC+02:00)	Del Piero 53'; Motta (yellow card) 81'	Report	Ehrenreich (yellow card) 24'	Stadium: Stadio Olimpico di Torino; Attendance: 15,585; Referee: Willie Collum (Scotland)

==== Group stage ====
Pos	Team	Pld	W	D	L	GF	GA	GD	Pts	Qualification
1	(England) Manchester City	6	3	2	1	11	6	+5	11	Advance to knockout phase
2	(Poland) Lech Poznań	6	3	2	1	11	8	+3	11	Advance to knockout phase
3	(Italy) Juventus	6	0	6	0	7	7	0	6	
4	(Austria) Red Bull Salzburg	6	0	2	4	1	9	−8	2	

Source: Soccerway

16 September 2010 1	Juventus (Italy)	3–3	(Poland) Lech Poznań	Turin, Italy
19:00 CEST (UTC+02:00)	Melo (yellow card) 13'; Sissoko (yellow card) 36'; Chiellini 45+2', 50'; Del Piero 68'	Report	Rudņevs 14' (pen.), 30', 90+2'; Arboleda (yellow card) 38'; Peszko (yellow card) 66'; Krivets (yellow card) 74'; Wojtkowiak (yellow card) 78'	Stadium: Stadio Olimpico di Torino; Attendance: 10,837; Referee: Vladislav Bezborodov (Russia)

30 September 2010 2	Manchester City (England)	1–1	(Italy) Juventus	Manchester, England
21:05 CEST (UTC+02:00)	A. Johnson 37'; Barry (yellow card) 63'	Report	Iaquinta 10'; Krasić (yellow card) 41'; Grygera (yellow card) 73'	Stadium: City of Manchester Stadium; Attendance: 44,967; Referee: Eduardo Iturralde González (Spain)

21 October 2010 3	Red Bull Salzburg (Austria)	1–1	(Italy) Juventus	Salzburg, Austria
21:05 CEST (UTC+02:00)	Švento 36'; Zárate (yellow card) 63'	Report	Krasić 47'; Martínez (yellow card) 57'; Melo (yellow card) 81'	Stadium: Red Bull Arena; Attendance: 24,832; Referee: Zsolt Szabó (Hungary)

4 November 2010 4	Juventus (Italy)	0–0	(Austria) Red Bull Salzburg	Turin, Italy
19:00 CET (UTC+01:00)	Sissoko (yellow card) 12'; Marchisio (yellow card) 55'	Report	Pokrivac (yellow card) 15'; Sekagya (yellow card) 40'; Jantscher (yellow card) 73'	Stadium: Stadio Olimpico di Torino; Attendance: 12,162; Referee: Daniel Stålhammar (Sweden)

1 December 2010 5	Lech Poznań (Poland)	1–1	(Italy) Juventus	Poznań, Poland
21:05 CET (UTC+01:00)	Rudņevs 12'	Report	Iaquinta 84'	Stadium: Stadion Miejski; Attendance: 41,734; Referee: Fernando Teixeira Vitienes (Spain)

16 December 2010 6	Juventus (Italy)	1–1	(England) Manchester City	Turin, Italy
19:00 CET (UTC+01:00)	Giannetti 43'; Melo (yellow card) 78'; Sissoko (yellow card) 87'	Report	Zabaleta (yellow card) 74'; Jô 76'	Stadium: Stadio Olimpico di Torino; Attendance: 6,992; Referee: István Vad (Hungary)

== Statistics ==
	Total	Home	Away
Games played	50	26	24
Games won	20	11	9
Games drawn	19	9	10
Games lost	11	6	5
Biggest win	4–0 vs Udinese; 4–0 vs Lecce	4–0 vs Lecce	4–0 vs Udinese
Biggest loss	1–4 vs Parma; 0–3 vs Napoli	1–4 vs Parma	0–3 vs Napoli
Biggest win (League)	4–0 vs Udinese; 4–0 vs Lecce	4–0 vs Lecce	4–0 vs Udinese
Biggest win (Cup)	2–0 vs Catania	2–0 vs Catania	None
Biggest win (Europe)	2–0 vs Shamrock Rovers	1–0 vs Shamrock Rovers; 1–0 Sturm Graz	2–0 vs Shamrock Rovers
Biggest loss (League)	1–4 vs Parma; 0–3 vs Napoli	1–4 vs Parma	0–3 vs Napoli
Biggest loss (Cup)	0–2 vs Roma	0–2 vs Roma	None
Biggest loss (Europe)	None	None	None
Clean sheets	15	6	9
Goals scored	72	43	29
Goals conceded	57	37	20
Goal difference	+15	+6	+9
Average GF per game	1.44	1.65	1.21
Average GA per game	1.14	1.42	0.83
Yellow cards	90	40	50
Red cards	5	2	3
Most appearances	(Italy) Alessandro Del Piero (44)	(Italy) Alessandro Del Piero (24) (Italy) Simone Pepe (24)	(Italy) Leonardo Bonucci (22)
Top scorer	(Italy) Alessandro Del Piero (11)	(Italy) Alessandro Del Piero (10)	(Italy) Fabio Quagliarella (6)
Worst discipline	(Italy) Claudio Marchisio 13 (yellow card)	(Mali) Mohamed Sissoko 6 (yellow card) (Italy) Claudio Marchisio 6 (yellow card) (Brazil) Felipe Melo 5 (yellow card) 1 (red card)	(Italy) Claudio Marchisio 7 (yellow card) (Italy) Simone Pepe 7 (yellow card)
Penalties for	4/5 (80%)	4/4 (100%)	0/1 (0%)
Penalties against	4/5 (80%)	2/2 (100%)	2/3 (66.67%)
Points (League)	58/114 (50.88%)	30/57 (52.63%)	28/57 (49.12%)
Winning rate	40%	42.31%	37.5%

Last updated: 22 May 2011
Source: Competitive matches

=== Appearances and goals ===
No.	Pos.	Player	LA	L	L (yellow card)	L (red card)	CA	C	C (yellow card)	C (red card)	EA	E	E (yellow card)	E (red card)	TA	T	T (yellow card)	T (red card)
1	GK	(Italy) Gianluigi Buffon	16	−17	1	1	1	0	0	0	0	0	0	0	17	-17	1	1
2	DF	(Italy) Marco Motta	22	0 (1)	8	1	2	0	1	0	8	0	1	0	32	0 (1)	10	1
3	DF	(Italy) Giorgio Chiellini	32	2	3	0	2	0	0	0	9	2	1	0	43	4	4	0
4	MF	(Brazil) Felipe Melo	29	1	6	1	2	0	0	0	7	0	3	0	38	1	9	1
5	MF	(Mali) Mohamed Sissoko	18	0	4	0	1	0	0	0	10	0	3	0	29	0	7	0
6	DF	(Italy) Fabio Grosso	19	0	6	0	2	0	0	0	0	0	0	0	21	0	6	0
7	MF	(Bosnia and Herzegovina) Hasan Salihamidžić	10	0	2	0	0	0	0	0	0	0	0	0	10	0	2	0
8	MF	(Italy) Claudio Marchisio	32	4	9	0	1	0	1	0	8	0	3	0	41	4	13	0
9	FW	(Italy) Vincenzo Iaquinta	19	4	1	0	1	0	0	0	3	2	0	0	23	6	1	0
10	FW	(Italy) Alessandro Del Piero	33	8	0	0	2	0	0	0	10	3	0	0	45	11	0	0
11	FW	(Italy) Amauri	9	0	0	0	1	0	0	0	6	3	0	0	16	3	0	0
13	GK	(Austria) Alexander Manninger	0	0	0	0	0	0	0	0	5	−7	0	0	5	-7	0	0
14	MF	(Italy) Alberto Aquilani	33	2	3	0	1	0	0	0	0	0	0	0	34	2	3	0
15	DF	(Italy) Andrea Barzagli	15	0	1	0	0	0	0	0	0	0	0	0	15	0	1	0
17	FW	(France) David Trezeguet	0	0	0	0	0	0	0	0	1	0	0	0	1	0	0	0
17	DF	(France) Armand Traoré	10	0	1	0	0	0	0	0	2	0	0	0	12	0	1	0
18	FW	(Italy) Fabio Quagliarella	17	9	0	0	0	0	0	0	0	0	0	0	17	9	0	0
19	DF	(Italy) Leonardo Bonucci	34	0 (1)	7	1	2	0	0	0	8	1	0	0	43	1 (1)	7	1
20	MF	(Italy) Davide Lanzafame	3	0	0	0	0	0	0	0	6	0	1	0	9	0	1	0
20	FW	(Italy) Luca Toni	14	2	0	0	1	0	0	0	0	0	0	0	15	2	0	0
21	DF	(Czech Republic) Zdeněk Grygera	13	0	1	0	2	0	0	0	4	0	1	0	19	0	2	0
23	MF	(Italy) Simone Pepe	30	4	9	0	2	1	0	0	10	0	1	0	42	5	10	0
25	MF	(Uruguay) Jorge Andrés Martínez	14	0	1	0	1	0	0	0	5	0	1	0	20	0	2	0
26	DF	(Italy) Leandro Rinaudo	1	0	1	0	0	0	0	0	0	0	0	0	1	0	1	0
27	MF	(Sweden) Albin Ekdal	0	0	0	0	0	0	0	0	1	0	0	0	1	0	0	0
27	MF	(Serbia) Miloš Krasić	33	6	4	0	2	1	0	0	6	1	1	0	41	8	5	0
28	FW	(Brazil) Diego	0	0	0	0	0	0	0	0	3	0	0	0	3	0	0	0
29	DF	(Italy) Paolo De Ceglie	7	0	0	0	0	0	0	0	7	0	0	0	14	0	0	0
30	GK	(Italy) Marco Storari	23	−30	2	0	1	−2	0	0	5	−1	0	0	29	-33	2	0
31	GK	(Italy) Marco Costantino	0	0	0	0	0	0	0	0	0	0	0	0	0	0	0	0
32	FW	(Italy) Alessandro Matri	16	9	0	0	0	0	0	0	0	0	0	0	16	9	0	0
33	DF	(Italy) Nicola Legrottaglie	5	1	0	0	0	0	0	0	3	0	0	0	8	1	0	0
34	DF	(Italy) Vittorio Ferrero	0	0	0	0	0	0	0	0	0	0	0	0	0	0	0	0
35	MF	(Austria) Marcel Büchel	0	0	0	0	0	0	0	0	2	0	0	0	2	0	0	0
36	MF	(Italy) Manuel Giandonato	2	0	0	1	0	0	0	0	2	0	0	0	4	0	0	1
37	MF	(Italy) Filippo Boniperti	1	0	0	0	0	0	0	0	1	0	0	0	2	0	0	0
38	FW	(Italy) Alberto Libertazzi	1	0	0	0	0	0	0	0	1	0	0	0	2	0	0	0
39	DF	(Italy) Vincenzo Camilleri	0	0	0	0	0	0	0	0	2	0	0	0	2	0	0	0
41	FW	(Italy) Niccolò Giannetti	1	0	0	0	0	0	0	0	2	1	0	0	3	1	0	0
43	DF	(Denmark) Frederik Sørensen	17	0	2	0	1	0	0	0	0	0	0	0	18	0	2	0
45	DF	(Italy) Andrea De Paola	0	0	0	0	0	0	0	0	0	0	0	0	0	0	0	0
45	MF	(Italy) Niccolò Corticchia	0	0	0	0	0	0	0	0	0	0	0	0	0	0	0	0
46	DF	(Italy) Matteo Liviero	0	0	0	0	0	0	0	0	1	0	0	0	1	0	0	0
		Own goals for	–	5	–	–	–	0	–	–	–	0	–	–	–	5	–	–
