= Boniperti =

Boniperti is an Italian surname. Notable people with the surname include:

- Filippo Boniperti (born 1991), Italian footballer
- Giampiero Boniperti (1928–2021), Italian footballer
