= Matteo Liviero =

Italian footballer

Personal information
- Date of birth: 13 April 1993 (age 33)
- Place of birth: Castelfranco Veneto, Italy
- Positions: Full back; wide midfielder

Team information
- Current team: Torres
- Number: 15

Youth career
- Juventus

Senior career*
Years	Team	Apps	(Gls)
2010–2016	Juventus	0	(0)
2012–2013	→ Perugia (loan)	21	(0)
2013–2014	→ Carpi (loan)	3	(0)
2014	→ Juve Stabia (loan)	19	(0)
2014–2015	→ Pro Vercelli (loan)	13	(0)
2015–2016	→ Lecce (loan)	16	(0)
2016–2017	Juve Stabia	17	(1)
2018	Cittadella	1	(0)
2019	Fano	15	(0)
2019–2020	Vicenza	11	(0)
2021	Monopoli	9	(1)
2021–2022	Imolese	30	(5)
2022–	Torres	84	(4)

International career
2009	Italy U17	2	(0)
2011	Italy U18	5	(0)
2011–2012	Italy U19	9	(0)
2012–2014	Italy U20	4	(0)
2013–2014	Italy U21	2	(0)
- * Club domestic league appearances and goals as of 30 April 2026

Matteo Liviero (born 13 April 1993) is an Italian professional footballer who plays as a left back or as a wide midfielder for Serie C Group B club Torres.

== Club career ==
Born in Castelfranco Veneto, Liviero began his career within the youth sector of Juventus. He began to earn call-ups to the senior squad during the 2010–11 season under then-Juventus manager Luigi Delneri. He made his professional debut for Juventus in the 2010–11 UEFA Europa League, in a match against Austrian team Red Bull Salzburg on 4 November 2010.

After graduating from the Primavera squad in June 2012, Liviero was sent on loan to Perugia in the Lega Pro Prima Divisione in order to gain first-team experience along with fellow Juventus youth-teammate, Carlos García. He spent further loan spells at Carpi, Juve Stabia, Pro Vercelli and Lecce. He also signed a new 2-year contract with Juve in 2014.

On 4 July 2016 Liviero was signed by Juve Stabia. He moved to Cittadella in January 2018. In his very first game for Cittadella he suffered a fibula fracture, missed most of the remainder of the season and his contract was allowed to lapse after the season ended.

On 31 January 2019, he signed with Fano.

On 1 August 2019, he joined Vicenza.

On 28 January 2021 he moved to Monopoli.

On 16 August 2021 he signed a one-year deal with Imolese.

On 11 August 2022, Liviero moved to Torres.

== International career ==
Liviero has been an Italian international since the under-17 level. He was a regular for the under-19 squad during the 2012 European Championship qualification.

== Career statistics ==
As of 1 June 2024

Appearances and goals by club, season and competition
Club	Season	League			National cup		Continental		Total	
Club	Season	Division!Apps	Goals	Apps	Goals	Apps	Goals	Apps	Goals	Apps
Juventus	2010–11	Serie A	0	0	—		1 (Note: Appearance(s) in UEFA Europa League)	0	1	0
Perugia (loan)	2012–13	Lega Pro Prima Divisione	21	0	—		—		21	0
Carpi (loan)	2013–14	Serie B	3	0	1	0	—		4	0
Juve Stabia (loan)	2013–14	Serie B	19	0	—		—		19	0
Pro Vercelli (loan)	2014–15	Serie B	13	0	—		—		13	0
Lecce (loan)	2015–16	Lega Pro	17	0	—		—		17	0
Juve Stabia	2016–17	Lega Pro	17	1	1	0	—		18	1
Cittadella	2017–18	Serie B	1	0	—		—		1	0
Fano	2018–19	Serie C	15	0	—		—		15	0
Vicenza	2019–20	Serie C	11	0	0	0	—		11	0
Monopoli	2020–21	Serie C	9	1	—		—		9	1
Imolese	2021–22	Serie C	32	5	—		—		32	5
Torres	2022–23	Serie C	27	1	—		—		27	1
Torres	2023–24	Serie C	25	2	—		—		25	2
Torres	Total		52	3	—		—		52	3
Career Total			210	10	2	0	1	0	213	10
