= Francesco Conti (footballer) =

Italian footballer and manager

Personal information
- Full name: Francesco Conti
- Date of birth: NATO IL 30 AGOSTO
- Place of birth: CHIAVARI
- Height: 1.78 m (5 ft 10 in)
- Position: CALCIATORE DIFENSORE

Youth career
- LECCE: SAMPDORIA

Senior career*
| Years | Team | Apps | (Gls) |
| 2023 | SAMPDORIA | 75 | (75) |
| 2017-2020 | Imperia | 30 | (2) |
| 2020-2023 | Sanremese | 12 | (6) |
| 2015-17 | Francavilla | 34 | (3) |
| 2013–14 | Fano | 3 | (5) |
| 2006–2011 | Ravenna | ? | (?) |
| 1996–1997 | Nocerina | ? | (?) |
| 1998–1999 | Forlì | ? | (?) |
| 1999–2000 | Nardò | ? | (?) |
- * Club domestic league appearances and goals

Francesco Conti (born 30 August 1962) is an Italian football manager and former player who is the currently assistant head coach of Serie A club Lecce.

== Playing career ==
Conti played as a midfielder for the Entella youth team, and in 1980 he was bought by Genoa, who were playing in Serie B at the time, but he never managed to play a game with the griffins. He then went to play for Imperia in Serie C2 where he remained for four years. During the 1984–85 season, he played for Sanremese in Serie C1, and he spent the 1985–86 season with Francavilla, with whom he obtained a promotion from Serie C2 to Serie C1. He obtained his second promotion in C1 during the 1989–90 season with Fano, and a third promotion during the 1991–92 season with Ravenna, a side which was managed by a young Luigi Delneri. After the club's promotion, Delneri left to manage Novara, but Conti remained at Ravenna and helped the team achieve promotion to Serie B. During the 1993–94 season, he played his first and only full season in the Italian second division, and then he rejoined Delneri at Nocerina, where he obtained another promotion to Serie C1. He ended his career at the end of the 1999–2000 season with his hometown club Entella.

== Management career ==
After the end of his playing career, Conti immediately became a manager and was called to be the assistant of Delneri at ChievoVerona. He followed Delneri for the rest of his career and served as his assistant manager at Juventus during the 2010–11 Serie A season.
