= Francesco Marianini =

Italian footballer

Personal information
- Full name: Francesco Marianini
- Date of birth: 6 May 1979 (age 47)
- Place of birth: Pisa, Italy
- Height: 1.84 m (6 ft 0 in)
- Position: Midfielder

Youth career
- Lucchese

Senior career*
Years	Team	Apps	(Gls)
1997–2003	Lucchese	117	(5)
2003–2004	Triestina	34	(2)
2004–2006	Lecce	25	(0)
2006–2010	Empoli	116	(6)
2010–2014	Novara	116	(2)
- * Club domestic league appearances and goals

Francesco Marianini (born 6 May 1979) is an Italian former association football midfielder.

Marianini started his career at Lucchese. In summer 2003, he joined Triestina of Serie B in co-ownership deal, but bought back in June 2004 and sold to Serie A side Lecce. After Lecce relegated, he joined Empoli of Serie A and followed the team relegated to Serie B in 2008.

In June 2010, he left for Serie B newcomer Novara on a three-year contract. On 18 July 2012 he added one more year (to 2014) to his current contract.
