= Jorge Martínez (footballer, born April 1983) =

Uruguayan footballer

Personal information
- Full name: Jorge Andrés Martínez Barrios
- Date of birth: 5 April 1983 (age 43)
- Place of birth: Montevideo, Uruguay
- Height: 1.78 m (5 ft 10 in)
- Position: Midfielder

Youth career
- 19??–2000: Montevideo Wanderers

Senior career*
Years	Team	Apps	(Gls)
2000–2007	Wanderers	134	(23)
2006–2007	→ Nacional (loan)	43	(9)
2007–2010	Catania	86	(22)
2010–2016	Juventus	14	(0)
2011–2012	→ Cesena (loan)	13	(0)
2012–2013	→ Cluj (loan)	0	(0)
2013–2014	→ Novara (loan)	1	(0)
2014–2016	→ Juventud (loan)	17	(1)
2016–2017	Juventud	1	(0)

International career
2004–2013	Uruguay	14	(1)
- * Club domestic league appearances and goals as of 2 December 2017

Jorge Andrés Martínez Barrios (born 5 April 1983) is a Uruguayan footballer who last played as a midfielder for Juventud de Las Piedras.

== Club career ==
=== Montevideo Wanderers ===
Born in Montevideo, Uruguay, Martínez began his footballing career with Primera División Uruguaya team Wanderers. He spent several seasons with the youth squad there, before moving to the senior squad in 2000. In his first season with the club, the striker managed 23 first team appearances, before making an additional 33 league appearances in which he also accounted for 2 league goals. In his third season, with the Montevideo-based team, Martínez was shifted into a more attacking role, and scored 7 goals in 26 league starts. His next two seasons at the club, were hampered by injuries as the young striker managed just 22 appearances, scoring 2 goals. During the 2006 winter transfer market, Martínez transferred away from his hometown club, after scoring 4 goals in just 11 appearances. The young Uruguayan transferred to Club Nacional de Football in 2006, after six first team seasons with the Wanderers.

=== Club Nacional ===
After transferring to Club Nacional de Football, Martínez quickly adapted to his new team, but was limited to 15 appearances and 3 goals in the league. His second season proved to be much more successful, as the player made over 30 appearances in all competitions, scoring 11 goals, 6 of which from league play. His impressive form during the 2006–07 season led to a transfer to Europe with Sicilian giants Calcio Catania of the Italian Serie A.

=== Calcio Catania ===
Martínez officially transferred to the Italian Serie A on 2 August 2007 for €3.2 million, when he was officially presented by Calcio Catania prior to the start of the 2007–08 Serie A season. His debut performance came as a 56th-minute substitute in a 0–0 home draw against Genoa C.F.C. on 2 September 2007. He followed his debut up with two starting appearances, though he was substituted in both of them.

Martínez did mark his first start, against Empoli F.C. on 26 September 2007, by scoring the winning goal in the 48th minute at his home stadium, the Stadio Angelo Massimino, with an assist from teammate Giacomo Tedesco. In his first season with the club, Martinez, managed 31 total appearances under then-coach Silvio Baldini. He scored 8 league goals, along with 3 goals in the 2007–08 Coppa Italia. Martinez notably saved Catania from relegation on the final day of the 2007–2008 Serie A season, by scoring the equalizer against Scudetto hopefuls AS Roma, leveling the score at 1–1. The result, ensured Catania's stay in the Italian top flight, deeming Empoli to relegation, and also guaranteed that Roma would not win the 2007–08 Scudetto. His second season proved to be just as successful as his first season, as the Uruguayan continued his good form under new coach Walter Zenga. Catania comfortably avoided relegation, and Martinez managed nearly 40 appearances in all competitions, scoring 8 goals in the process. During the 2009–10 season, Martinez was the in-form player for the Sicilian club, for much of the season, as he formed a very formidable strike force with Maxi López and Giuseppe Mascara. He was a major part of the team that managed to defeat Serie A giants Juventus FC, AC Milan, Inter Milan, and archrivals Palermo during the season. Despite ending the season injured, the winger managed 25 Serie A appearances with a career best 9 goals. He also scored 2 goals in 4 Coppa Italia matches.

Martínez had been a very influential part of the Sicilian team during his three-year stay, and helped lead Catania to a record points total in the Serie A and a 12th-place finish in the table during the 2009–10 Serie A campaign.

=== Juventus ===
On 28 June 2010, Martínez along with Leonardo Bonucci had medical testings in Turin ahead of their proposed transfers to Juventus. On 1 July 2010 the deal was officially completed, with the club paying €12 million to Catania for the winger's services. Juventus signed Martínez on a 4-year contract that would expire on 30 June 2014. The player started the campaign in unfortunate circumstance, being injured in his debut match for the club, a shocking 1–0 away loss to A.S. Bari. After finally returning from injury in late-October, Martínez made his return in a 0–0 draw with Bologna, coming on as a 71st-minute substitute. He returned to the starting lineup one week later in a 2–1 away victory at San Siro over AC Milan, and was recognized for an outstanding performance in the match, before an injury in the 56th minute of the match forced a substitution. The injury was later confirmed to be a major contusion to his left foot, keeping the player out of action for nearly 4 months. He made his return to action once more on 23 January 2011 in league play against UC Sampdoria, playing in 9 additional matches to bring his injury-havened season to a close.

Unfortunately for the player, the team underwent many changes at the conclusion of the 2010–11 Serie A campaign, and after such an injury-plagued season, Martínez was seemingly not part of the club's future plans under newly appointed coach, Antonio Conte. Despite remaining with the first team throughout the 2011–12 Serie A pre-season and taking part in multiple pre-season friendlies, it was confirmed on 29 August 2011that Martínez would spend the 2011–12 Serie A season on a season-long loan deal with AC Cesena in an attempt for the player to regain full fitness and form over the course of the campaign. Unfortunately for the Uruguayan international, his new start was injury ravaged once more, and he managed just 13 appearances for the Seahorses who ultimately were relegated at the end of the season.

After returning to Juventus on 30 June 2012, Martínez was no longer part of the future plans of the reigning Serie A champions, and was linked with a return to Catania despite his poor season with Cesena, though he eventually signed for Romanian Liga I outfit, CFR Cluj on 2 September 2012 in what would be another season-long loan deal.

On 2 September 2013, Martínez joined Novara Calcio on a season-long loan deal. He returned to Juventus on 30 June 2014. Martínez also extended his contract in 2013 and again on 1 July 2014. (to 30 June 2015 and 2016 respectively)

== International career ==
Martínez made 14 appearances for Uruguay between 2003 and 2010, scoring one goal. He was selected for the 2004 Copa América and was part of his side's 2010 World Cup qualifying campaign, although he missed the tournament due to an injury.

=== International goals ===
Scores and results list Uruguay's goal tally first.

No	Date	Venue	Opponent	Score	Result	Competition
1.	11 February 2009	June 11 Stadium, Tripoli, Libya	Libya	2–2	3–2	Friendly
