= Filippo Boniperti =

Italian professional footballer

Personal information
- Date of birth: 27 September 1991 (age 35)
- Place of birth: Turin, Italy
- Height: 1.76 m (5 ft 9 in)
- Position: Midfielder

Youth career
- Juventus

Senior career*
Years	Team	Apps	(Gls)
2010–2013	Juventus	1	(0)
2011–2012	→ Ascoli (loan)	8	(0)
2012	→ Carpi (loan)	12	(1)
2012–2013	→ Empoli (loan)	0	(0)
2013–2015	Parma	2	(0)
2013–2014	→ Crotone (loan)	5	(0)
2014	→ Gorica (loan)	13	(4)
2014–2015	→ Mantova (loan)	26	(3)
2015–2016	Alessandria	11	(2)
2016–2017	Mantova	10	(0)
2017	Cuneo	5	(0)

International career
2010	Italy U19	2	(0)
- * Club domestic league appearances and goals as of 1 January 2018

Filippo Boniperti (born 27 September 1991) is an Italian professional footballer who last played as a midfielder for Cuneo.

== Club career ==
Born in Turin, Boniperti is a Juventus youth product. He made his professional debut for Juventus on 16 December 2010 in a Europa League game against Manchester City. His Serie A debut came on 22 May 2011 in Juventus' final game of the 2010–11 season, in which he came on as a substitute for Simone Pepe at the start of the second half. Boniperti was loaned to Ascoli for the 2011–12 season.

On 31 January 2013, he joined Parma, while Alberto Gallinetta moved to Juventus.

In summer 2015, he was signed by Alessandria. On 18 July 2016, he was released.

After his release from Alessandria he rejoined Mantova.

== Personal life ==
Filippo is the grandson of the late footballer and Juventus honorary president Giampiero Boniperti.
