= Manuel Giandonato =

Italian footballer

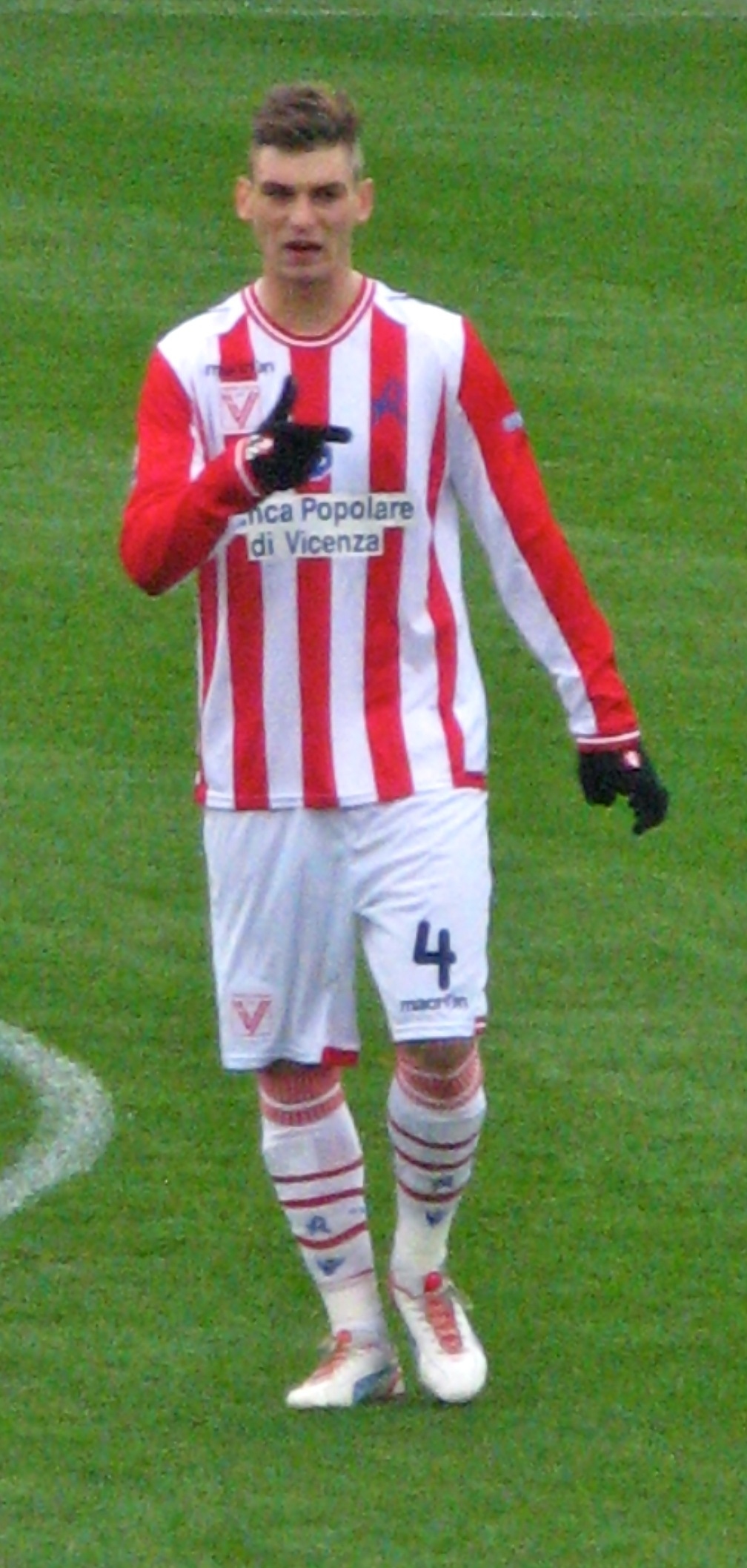

Personal information
- Date of birth: 10 October 1991 (age 35)
- Place of birth: Casoli, Italy
- Height: 1.89 m (6 ft 2 1/2 in)
- Position: Midfielder

Team information
- Current team: L'Aquila
- Number: 18

Youth career
- 2004–2005: Pescara
- 2005–2010: Juventus

Senior career*
| Years | Team | Apps | (Gls) |
| 2010–2013 | Juventus | 3 | (0) |
| 2011–2012 | → Lecce (loan) | 8 | (0) |
| 2012–2013 | → Vicenza (loan) | 13 | (1) |
| 2013 | → Cesena (loan) | 13 | (0) |
| 2014 | Parma | 0 | (0) |
| 2014 | → Juve Stabia (loan) | 10 | (0) |
| 2014–2015 | → Salernitana (loan) | 12 | (0) |
| 2015 | → Catanzaro (loan) | 12 | (2) |
| 2015–2016 | Padova | 8 | (0) |
| 2015–2016 | → Virtus Lanciano (loan) | 12 | (0) |
| 2016–2018 | Livorno | 40 | (0) |
| 2018–2019 | Fermana | 32 | (3) |
| 2019–2020 | Piacenza | 9 | (0) |
| 2020 | → Olbia (loan) | 8 | (0) |
| 2020–2022 | Olbia | 46 | (1) |
| 2022–2024 | Fermana | 61 | (10) |
| 2024– | L'Aquila | 10 | (1) |

International career
| 2006–2007 | Italy U-16 | 4 | (0) |
| 2007–2008 | Italy U-17 | 5 | (0) |
| 2009 | Italy U-18 | 2 | (0) |
| 2010 | Italy U-19 | 1 | (0) |
| 2010 | Italy U-20 | 1 | (0) |
| 2010–2012 | Italy U-21 | 1 | (0) |
| 2012 | Italy B | 2 | (1) |
- * Club domestic league appearances and goals as of 17 November 2024

Manuel Giandonato (born 10 October 1991) is an Italian footballer who plays as a midfielder for Serie D club L'Aquila.

== Club career ==
=== Juventus ===
Giandonato began his youth career with Juventus in 2004, and was promoted to the Primavera (Under 20) squad in 2009. After 7 years in the club's youth system, Giandonato began to earn senior call-ups during the 2009–10 Serie A season, and made his first Serie A appearance on 6 February 2010, coming on as an 83rd-minute substitute for club captain and icon, Alessandro Del Piero in a league match against Livorno. After making his first team debut, Giandonato helped the Primavera squad win their second consecutive Viareggio title in 2010. He made his first start for Juventus on 19 December 2010 against Chievo Verona, though he was sent off in the 52nd minute of the match for a professional foul. Giandonato scored a stunning free kick against Manchester United in Gary Neville's testimonial match.

On 30 August 2011, Giandonato joined US Lecce on a season-long loan deal along with teammate Cristian Pasquato, in order to gain regular first-team experience. He made his debut with Lecce on 11 September 2011, starting in the 0–2 home loss against Udinese. On 30 June 2012, Giandonato returned to Juventus after making just 8 first team appearances for the Stadio Via del Mare outfit.

After taking part in much of Juventus' 2012–13 Serie A pre-season, Giandonato was loaned out to Serie B side, Vicenza Calcio on 27 August 2012 on another season-long loan operation. The loan deal, however, was cut short on 30 January 2013, when Juventus recalled the player in order to loan him out to fellow Serie B side, AC Cesena. Between the two clubs, Giandonato was a first team regular for much of the campaign, making 26 league appearances and scoring 1 goal.

Giandonato returned to Juventus on 30 June 2013, only to be released less than three months later.

=== Piacenza ===
On 16 July 2019, he signed with Piacenza.

=== Olbia ===
On 10 January 2020 he joined Olbia on loan. On 6 August 2020 he moved to Olbia on a permanent basis.

=== Fermana ===
On 19 August 2022, Giandonato returned to Fermana.

== International career ==
Giandonato has represented Italy at the international level since 2006, when he began to earn call-ups for the U-16 squad. He has also been capped for the U-17, U-18, U-19 and U-20 teams. On 17 November 2010 he made his debut for the Italy U-21 team in a friendly game against Turkey. He has also been a member of the Italy under-21 Serie B representative team on 2 occasions, scoring a goal.
