= Luigi Delneri =

Italian footballer and manager

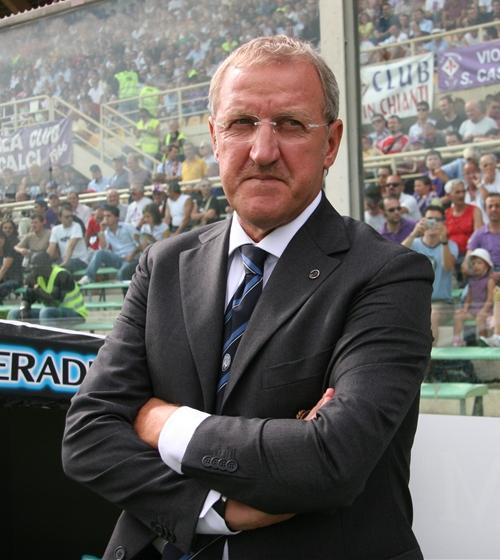
- Delneri as Atalanta manager in 2007

Personal information
- Full name: Luigi Delneri
- Date of birth: 23 August 1950 (age 76)
- Place of birth: Aquileia, Italy
- Position: Midfielder

Senior career*
Years	Team	Apps	(Gls)
1967–1968	Aquileia		
1968–1972	SPAL	66	(0)
1972–1974	Foggia	51	(5)
1974–1975	Novara	33	(1)
1975–1978	Foggia	92	(6)
1978–1980	Udinese	59	(7)
1980–1981	Sampdoria	33	(1)
1981–1982	Vicenza	31	(4)
1982–1983	Siena	24	(1)
1983–1984	Pro Gorizia	32	(8)
1984–1985	Opitergina		

Managerial career
- 1985–1986: Opitergina
- 1986–1989: Pro Gorizia
- 1989–1990: Partinicaudace
- 1990–1991: Teramo
- 1991–1992: Ravenna
- 1992–1994: Novara
- 1994–1996: Nocerina
- 1996–1998: Ternana
- 1998: Empoli
- 1998–1999: Ternana
- 2000–2004: Chievo
- 2004: Porto
- 2004–2005: Roma
- 2005–2006: Palermo
- 2006–2007: Chievo
- 2007–2009: Atalanta
- 2009–2010: Sampdoria
- 2010–2011: Juventus
- 2012–2013: Genoa
- 2015–2016: Hellas Verona
- 2016–2017: Udinese
- 2020: Brescia
- * Club domestic league appearances and goals

Luigi Delneri (born 23 August 1950), often incorrectly written as Del Neri, is an Italian football manager and a former player.

After a playing career as a midfielder including for several Serie A clubs, he began managing in the lower leagues, and took Ternana to consecutive promotions into Serie B. He then spent four years at Chievo, helping the Verona neighbourhood club into Serie A for the first time and to 5th place and UEFA Cup qualification in their first season at the top.

Delneri left Chievo in 2004 for UEFA Champions League holders Porto, but was dismissed within weeks and before a competitive game. He subsequently managed several Serie A clubs in the following years, including one season with Juventus after taking Sampdoria to fourth place in 2010.

== Playing career ==
Born in Aquileia, Udine, Delneri made his professional debut as a player at the age of 16 for SPAL, Ferrara's football team, for which he had worked as a storer. After playing for Foggia and Novara, he moved to Udinese, with whom he gained promotion to Serie A, Italy's top division. He was later traded to Sampdoria and then to Vicenza, Siena, Pro Gorizia and Opitergina, an amateur team from Oderzo, where he ended his playing career at 34.

== Coaching career ==
=== Early career / Chievo ===
After his retirement as a player, Delneri stayed at Oderzo, appointed by chairman Ettore Setten (now owner of Treviso) as head coach. In 1986, he signed for Serie D team Pro Gorizia. He then coached Partinicaudace, a minor Sicilian Serie D team, in 1989, Teramo, Ravenna, Novara and Nocerina of Serie C2; with this last team he won the league and promotion to Serie C1. He then moved to Ternana of Serie C2, guiding it to Serie B after two consecutive promotions.

In 1998, after his second consecutive promotion, Delneri was signed by Serie A's Empoli, but was fired before starting the championship and was subsequently recalled by his former team, Ternana, in Serie B.

In 2000, Delneri signed with Chievo of Serie B, a team representing a small quarter of the city of Verona. It was the beginning of the so-called "Chievo miracle" in which the team was promoted for the first time to Serie A, where they topped the league for the first half of the season and then qualified for the UEFA Cup by coming 5th.

=== Porto, Roma and Palermo ===
In June 2004, Delneri signed a three-year contract to succeed José Mourinho at UEFA Champions League holders Porto. He was sacked on 7 August, without even managing a competitive game, allegedly for missing training sessions.

Delneri became Roma's third manager of the season in October 2004, after Cesare Prandelli and Rudi Völler. His team failed to advance from their Champions League group, and he dropped young forward Antonio Cassano after a dispute. He resigned from his two-year contract in March 2005, with the team in 7th, and handed the job over to Bruno Conti.

In June 2005, Delneri signed for Palermo, succeeding Francesco Guidolin who had quit for new challenges after qualifying them for the 2005–06 UEFA Cup. He was fired on 28 January 2006 with the team in 10th after a 3–1 home loss to Siena, having taken them into the knockout stages of the UEFA Cup.

=== Chievo return, Atalanta and Sampdoria ===
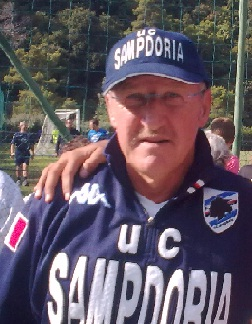
Delneri as Sampdoria manager in 2009

On 16 October 2006, Delneri returned to coach Chievo, replacing Giuseppe Pillon at the 15th-place club. Despite a strong start, he did not manage to save his side from relegation, losing a spot in the following season's Serie A with a 2–0 loss to Catania on the final matchday.

Following the relegation, Delneri was appointed Atalanta's new boss in June 2007. He led the team from Bergamo to 9th and 11th place in his two seasons; he announced in April 2009 that he would leave at the end of the season.

Delneri left to take over at Sampdoria on 1 June 2009, a team that had just finished 13th. He guided Sampdoria to a surprising fourth-place finish, and a spot in the third qualifying round of the 2010–11 UEFA Champions League, leaving the next day.

=== Juventus ===
On 19 May 2010, two days after leaving Sampdoria, Delneri was appointed as coach of Juventus. At the end of the 2010–11 season, having finished 7th and not qualified for Europe, Delneri was sacked by the Juventus board of directors.

=== Later career ===
On 22 October 2012, Delneri was named new head coach of tenth-place Genoa in Serie A, succeeding sacked coach Luigi De Canio at Sampdoria's rivals. On 20 January 2013, however, Delneri was himself sacked following a 0–2 home loss to Catania and a string of bad results for the team, which recorded only two wins in his 13 matches with the club.

Delneri was hired at another of his former club's rivals, this time Chievo's adversaries Hellas Verona, replacing Andrea Mandorlini on 1 December 2015; the team had not won once all season. He left by mutual consent after the season ended in relegation for the club on 23 May 2016.

On 3 October 2016, Delneri signed a one-year deal with the option of a second at Udinese, succeeding Giuseppe Iachini who had won two of seven games. He finished the campaign in 13th, earning a second year, but took 12 points from the first 12 games and lost his job on 21 November 2017 when three points above the relegation places.

On 4 September 2020, Delneri was officially appointed manager of Brescia, following their relegation to Serie B. On 6 October 2020, after one draw and one loss, positioned in last place, Delneri was sacked.

== Style of management ==
As a manager, Delneri is known for using a spectacular, offensive-minded style of football, which is heavily influenced by Arrigo Sacchi's tactics at Milan, as well as Dutch total football. His teams are known for their work-rate, strength, heavy running, and aggressive use of pressing when defending off the ball, while they are known for their movement off the ball, ability to change positions, and make overlapping runs when attacking. A tactically intelligent manager, his preferred formation is the 4–4–2, which relies on a high defensive line, although he has also been known to adopt other systems which better suit the characteristics of his players, including the 4–3–3.

== Managerial statistics ==
As of 6 October 2020

Managerial record by team and tenure
Team	Nat	From	To	Record							
Team	Nat	From	To	G	W	D	L	GF	GA	GD	Win %
Teramo	(Italy)	10 June 1990	12 June 1991	40	16	16	8	38	22	+16	40.00
Ravenna	(Italy)	12 June 1991	30 June 1992	46	21	19	6	57	36	+21	45.65
Novara	(Italy)	30 June 1992	20 June 1994	74	27	31	16	80	57	+23	36.49
Nocerina	(Italy)	24 October 1994	18 June 1996	68	31	26	11	70	34	+36	45.59
Ternana	(Italy)	18 June 1996	30 June 1998	83	43	29	11	98	56	+42	51.81
Empoli	(Italy)	1 July 1998	17 August 1998	0	0	0	0	0	0	+0	—
Ternana	(Italy)	6 November 1998	26 January 1999	9	0	5	4	6	12	−6	0.00
Chievo	(Italy)	14 June 2000	4 June 2004	154	65	48	41	213	182	+31	42.21
Porto	(Portugal)	4 June 2004	7 August 2004	0	0	0	0	0	0	+0	—
Roma	(Italy)	29 September 2004	14 March 2005	31	11	8	12	48	46	+2	35.48
Palermo	(Italy)	31 May 2005	29 January 2006	31	11	11	9	47	43	+4	35.48
Chievo	(Italy)	16 October 2006	11 June 2007	36	9	13	14	37	44	−7	25.00
Atalanta	(Italy)	11 June 2007	1 June 2009	79	26	20	33	100	109	−9	32.91
Sampdoria	(Italy)	1 June 2009	17 May 2010	40	20	10	10	56	45	+11	50.00
Juventus	(Italy)	19 May 2010	23 May 2011	50	20	19	11	72	57	+15	40.00
Genoa	(Italy)	22 October 2012	20 January 2013	13	2	2	9	11	22	−11	15.38
Hellas Verona	(Italy)	1 December 2015	23 May 2016	26	6	7	13	25	42	−17	23.08
Udinese	(Italy)	4 October 2016	21 November 2017	44	15	8	21	62	69	−7	34.09
Brescia	(Italy)	4 September 2020	6 October 2020	3	1	1	1	4	4	+0	33.33
Total				827	324	273	230	1,024	880	+144	39.18

== Honours ==
=== Coach ===
Individual

- Serie A Coach of the Year (1): 2001–02
- Panchina d'Oro (1): 2001–02
