= 2012–13 AS Bari season =

A.S. Bari
2012–13 season
- Stadium: Stadio San Nicola
- Serie B: League starts in August 2012

The 2012–13 A.S. Bari season was the 86th season in club history, with matches playing at the Stadio San Nicola in Serie B and participation in the Coppa Italia.

Bari finished 12th in Serie B with a record of 16 wins, 12 draws, and 14 losses, totaling 53 points

== Review and events ==
Early in the season, Bari faced serious financial distress, bankrupt by March 2012. With Gianluca Paparesta stepping in as the club's savior

Francesco Caputo was the top scorer with 17 goals

== Matches ==
=== Legend ===
Win Draw Loss Postponed

=== Serie B ===
Pos	Team	Pld	W	D	L	GF	GA	GD	Pts
8	Modena (Note: Modena and Reggina were docked 2 points due to the 2011 Italian football scandal.)	42	15	12	15	52	51	+1	55
9	Ternana	42	12	17	13	37	38	−1	53 (Note: TER: 11pts; BAR: 10pts; PAD: 8pts; CRO: 2pts)
10	Bari (Note: Bari was docked 7 points: 2 points due to financial irregularities and 5 points due to the 2011 Italian football scandal.)	42	16	12	14	55	47	+8	53
11	Padova	42	12	17	13	47	51	−4	53
12	Crotone (Note: Crotone was docked 2 points due to financial irregularities.)	42	14	13	15	45	56	−11	53

Source: Serie B
Rules for classification: 1) points; 2) head-to-head points; 3) head-to-head goal difference; 4) head-to-head goals scored; 5) goal difference; 6) number of goals scored.
Notes:

25 August 2012 1	A.S. Bari	2–1	A.S. Cittadella	Bari
20:45	Ceppitelli 9'; Claiton (yellow card) 44'; Caputo 62'; Daniele Sciaudone (yellow card) 90'	Summary	Schiavon (yellow card) 21'; Claiton 46' (o.g.); Pellizzer (yellow card) 51'; Coly (yellow card) 68'; Biraghi (yellow card) 90'	Stadium: Stadio San Nicola; Attendance: 367; Referee: Gianluca Manganiello; Assistant referees: Andrea Chiocchi; Daniele Ceccarelli; Fourth official: Ivano Pezzuto

1 September 2012 2	Ascoli	1–3	A.S. Bari	Ascoli Piceno
20:45	Vasco Faísca 16'; Russo (yellow card) 78'	Summary	Claiton (yellow card) 17' (goal) 65'; Albadoro (yellow card) 78'; Ceppitelli 86'; Galano 89'	Stadium: Stadio Cino e Lillo Del Duca; Attendance: 1,731; Referee: Flippo Merchiori; Assistant referees: Salvatore Argiento; Ciro Carbone; Fourth official: Francesco Strocchia

9 September 2012 3	A.S. Bari	2–0	Ternana Calcio	Bari
15:00 CEST	Iunco 1'; Caputo 28' (yellow card) 63'; Ceppitelli (yellow card) 32'; Bellomo (yellow card) 39' (yellow-red card) 49'	Summary	Pisacane (yellow card) 78'	Stadium: Stadio San Nicola; Attendance: 679; Referee: Michael Fabbri; Assistant referees: Vincenzo Manna; Giovanni Colella; Fourth official: Valerio Marini

17 September 2012 4	A.S. Varese 1910	2–2	A.S. Bari	Varese
20:45 CEST	Daniele Corti (yellow card) 41'; Ebagua 54' (yellow card) 64'; Carrozzieri (yellow card) 56'; Zecchin (yellow card) 71'; Koné 82'	Summary	Stefano Sabelli (yellow card) 43'; Caputo 87'; Iunco (yellow card) 90'; Borghese 90+1'	Stadium: Stadio Franco Ossola; Attendance: 2,605; Referee: Angelo Martino Giancola; Assistant referees: Sergio Ranghetti; Stefano Giovane; Fourth official: Diego Bruno

22 September 2012 5	Crotone	0–0	A.S. Bari	Crotone
15:00	Giuseppe Torromino (yellow card) 41'; Antonio Galardo (yellow card) 84'	Summary	Claiton (yellow card) 23'; Caputo (yellow card) 53'; Bellomo (yellow card) 70'; Romizi (yellow card) 89'; Defendi (red card) 90'	Stadium: Stadio Ezio Scida; Attendance: 1,016; Referee: Luca Pairetto

25 September 2012 6	A.S. Bari	0–0	Pro Vercelli	Bari
20:45	Bellomo 8', 67'; Romizi (yellow card) 40'; Iunco (yellow card) 81'; Caputo (yellow card) 84'	Summary	Fabiano (yellow card) 42'; Gabriel 74'; Giacomo Casoli (yellow card) 88'	Stadium: Stadio San Nicola; Attendance: 222; Referee: Francesco Borriello

29 September 2012 7	Verona	1–0	A.S. Bari	Verona
15:00	Jorginho (yellow card) 50'; Bojinov 88'	Summary	Stefano Sabelli (yellow card) 30'; Claiton (yellow card) 39'; Borghese (yellow card) 73'; Ceppitelli (yellow card) 78'	Stadium: Stadio Marc'Antonio Bentegodi; Attendance: 1,788; Referee: Emilio Ostinelli

6 October 2012 8	A.S. Bari	1–0	Vicenza	Bari
15:00	Romizi (yellow card) 12'; Bellomo 49'; Filkor (yellow card) 57'	Summary	Semioli (yellow card) 87'; Pisano (yellow card) 90+2'	Stadium: Stadio San Nicola; Attendance: 1,619; Referee: Federico La Penna

13 October 2012 9	Juve Stabia	2–1	A.S. Bari	Castellammare di Stabia
18:00	Genevier (yellow card) 13'; Jerry Mbakogu 16', 75'; Dicuonzo (yellow card) 25'; Baldanzeddu (yellow card) 34'; Erpen (yellow card) 53'; Adriano Mezavilla (yellow card) 90+2'	Summary	Bellomo (yellow card) 15'; Claiton (yellow card) 34'; Caputo 54'	Stadium: Stadio Romeo Menti; Attendance: 1,179; Referee: Francesco Castrignano

22 October 2012 10	A.S. Bari	1–1	Brescia	Bari
20:45	Galano 44'; Defendi (yellow card) 55'	Summary	Daprelà 15' (yellow card) 68'; Caracciolo (yellow card) 23'; Stovini (yellow card) 35'	Stadium: Stadio San Nicola; Attendance: 4,000; Referee: Dino Tommasi

27 October 2012 11	Padova	1–1	A.S. Bari	Padua
15:00	Granoche 53'; Viviani (yellow card) 66'; Legati (yellow card) 83'	Summary	Iunco (yellow card) 25'; Daniele Sciaudone (yellow card) 50' (goal) 56'; Bellomo (yellow card) 85'	Stadium: Stadio Euganeo; Attendance: 1,247; Referee: Claudio Cavillucci

30 October 2012 12	A.S. Bari	2–3	Empoli	Bari
20:45	Claiton 3'; Bellomo 22' (yellow card) 26'; Romizi (yellow card) 66'; Galano (yellow card) 90'	Summary	Moro (yellow card) 38'; Valdifiori (yellow card) 52'; Tavano 57'; Pratali 73'; Tonelli 87'	Stadium: Stadio San Nicola; Referee: Gennaro Palazzino

3 November 2012 13	Livorno	2–1	A.S. Bari	Livorno
15:00	Dionisi 6' (pen.); Schiattarella 58'; Fiorillo (yellow card) 79'; Remedi (red card) 79'	Summary	Claiton (yellow card) 5'; González (yellow card) 17'; Stefano Sabelli (yellow card) 54'; Bellomo (yellow card) 62'; Polenta (yellow card) 64'; Francesco Fedato 73'	Stadium: Stadio Armando Picchi; Attendance: 1,664

12 November 2012 14	A.S. Bari	0–1	Reggina	Bari
20:45	Ristovski (yellow card) 20'; Filkor (yellow card) 60'; Borghese (yellow card) 85'	Summary	Marco Armellino (yellow card) 4'; Hetemaj (yellow card) 8'; Comi 71' (yellow card) 84'; Fabrizio Melara (yellow card) 86'; Fischnaller (yellow card) 90'	Stadium: Stadio San Nicola; Referee: Emilio Ostinelli

17 November 2012 15	Virtus Lanciano	0–3	A.S. Bari	Lanciano
15:00	Gouano (yellow card) 51'; Fofana (yellow card) 73'; Aquilanti (yellow card) 80'	Summary	Stefano Sabelli (yellow card) 23'; Francesco Fedato (yellow card) 27'; Romizi (yellow card) 29'; Daniele Sciaudone 31' (yellow card) 66'; Caputo 34', 51' (pen.); Claiton (yellow card) 36'	Stadium: Stadio Guido Biondi; Attendance: 843; Referee: Federico La Penna

25 November 2012 16	A.S. Bari	2–0	Modena	Bari
12:30	Daniele Sciaudone (yellow card) 27'; Bellomo (yellow card) 37'; Ceppitelli (yellow card) 41' (yellow-red card); Caputo 64' (pen.), 88' (pen.); Romizi (yellow card) 75'	Summary	Pagano (yellow card) 31'; Colombi (red card) 56'; Osuji (yellow card) 81'; Anđelković (yellow card) 87'	Stadium: Stadio San Nicola; Referee: Michael Fabbri

1 December 2012 17	A.S. Bari	3–3	Sassuolo	Bari
15:00	Borghese (yellow card) 6'; Polenta 33' (yellow card) 81'; Galano 35', 61'; Daniele Sciaudone (yellow card) 51'; Romizi (yellow card) 90+1'	Summary	Terranova (yellow card) 17' (goal) 68'; Missiroli 18'; Catellani 36'; Bianchi (yellow card) 60'	Stadium: Stadio San Nicola; Attendance: 6,638; Referee: Leonardo Baracani

8 December 2012 18	Spezia	3–2	A.S. Bari	La Spezia
15:00	Di Gennaro 40'; Porcari (yellow card) 45+1'; Sansovini 56', 72'; Antenucci (yellow card) 68'	Summary	Romizi (yellow card) 20'; Francesco Fedato (yellow card) 25'; Galano (yellow card) 37'; Sabelli (yellow card) 53'; Ceppitelli 58'; Caputo 80'	Stadium: Stadio Alberto Picco; Attendance: 1,377; Referee: Claudio Gavillucci

15 December 2012 19	A.S. Bari	1–3	Novara	Bari
15:00	Francesco Fedato 65'; Borghese (yellow card) 75'	Summary	Barusso (yellow card) 39'; Buzzegoli 47'; Mehmeti 58'; González (yellow card) 64' (goal) 75' (pen.); Bardi (yellow card) 72'	Stadium: Stadio San Nicola; Attendance: 262; Referee: Dino Tommasi

23 December 2012 20	Cesena	1–1	A.S. Bari	Cesena
12:30	Defrel 3'; Đoković (yellow card) 34' (yellow-red card); Caldirola (yellow card) 67'; Rossi (red card) 77'; Tonucci (yellow card) 86'	Summary	Romizi (yellow card) 15' (yellow-red card); Ceppitelli (yellow card) 29'; Bellomo 49'; Francesco Fedato (yellow card) 54'; Polenta (yellow card) 73'; Iunco (yellow card) 85'	Stadium: Stadio Dino Manuzzi; Attendance: 9,364; Referee: Filippo Merchiori

26 December 2012 21	A.S. Bari	1–0	Grosseto	Bari
15:00	Sabelli (yellow card) 14'; Francesco Fedato (yellow card) 69' (goal) 90+5'	Summary	Padella (yellow card) 26' (red card) 42'; Jadid (yellow card) 56'; Crimi (yellow card) 57'	Stadium: Stadio San Nicola; Attendance: 964; Referee: Aleandro Di Paolo

30 December 2012 22	Cittadella	1–1	A.S. Bari	Cittadella
15:00	Maah 14'; Paolucci (yellow card) 32' (yellow-red card); De Vito (yellow card) 90+2'	Summary	Sabelli (yellow card) 7'; Romizi (yellow card) 28'; Bellomo 54'; Ceppitelli (yellow card) 59'; Defendi (yellow card) 72'; De Falco (yellow card) 79'	Stadium: Stadio Pier Cesare Tombolato; Attendance: 901; Referee: Fabrizio Pasqua

26 January 2013 23	A.S. Bari	0–1	Ascoli	Bari
15:00	Polenta (yellow card) 27'; Ceppitelli (yellow card) 59'		Zaza 15'; Russo (yellow card) 40'; Maurantonio (yellow card) 45'	Stadium: Stadio San Nicola; Attendance: 6,216; Referee: Sara Roca

2 February 2013 24	Ternana	0–0	A.S. Bari	Terni
15:00	Ragusa (yellow card) 29'; Brosco (yellow card) 37'	Summary	De Falco (yellow card) 26'	Stadium: Stadio Libero Liberati; Attendance: 5,359; Referee: Luca Pairetto

9 February 2013 25	A.S. Bari	0–1	Varese	Bari
15:00	Daniele Sciaudone (yellow card) 73' (yellow-red card); Polenta (yellow card) 78'	Summary	Pucino 12'; Damonte (yellow card) 43' (yellow-red card); Oduamadi (yellow card) 44'; Walter Bressan (yellow card) 72'	Stadium: Stadio San Nicola; Attendance: 6,022; Referee: Angelo Cervellera

16 February 2013 26	A.S. Bari	0–0	Crotone	Bari
15:00	Francesco Fedato (yellow card) 13'; Romizi (yellow card) 60'	Summary	Denilson Gabionetta (yellow card) 27'; Migliore (yellow card) 62'; Crisetig (yellow card) 71'	Stadium: Stadio San Nicola; Attendance: 6,022; Referee: Federico La Penna

23 February 2013 27	F.C. Pro Vercelli 1892	2–1	A.S. Bari	Vercelli
15:00	Genevier (yellow card) 53'; Marco Modolo 54'; Ragatzu 65'; Scaglia (yellow card) 70'	Summary	Caputo 22'; Ceppitelli (yellow card) 69'; Ghezzal (yellow card) 77'; Iunco (yellow card) 80'; Claiton (yellow card) 89' (red card) 90'	Stadium: Stadio Silvio Piola; Attendance: 2,500; Referee: Massimiliano Irrati

27 February 2013 28	A.S. Bari	0–2	Verona	Bari
20:45	Iunco (yellow card) 24'; Polenta (yellow card) 32'; Rossi (yellow card) 72' (yellow-red card); Bellomo (red card) 90+3'	Summary	Cacciatore (yellow card) 14'; Raphael Martinho 28', 90+3'; Albertazzi (yellow card) 32'; Gómez Taleb (yellow card) 76'	Stadium: Stadio San Nicola; Attendance: 539; Referee: Leonardo Baracani

4 March 2013 29	Vicenza	0–1	A.S. Bari	Vicenza
19:00	Ciaramitaro (yellow card) 71'; Camisa (yellow card) 85'	Summary	Caputo 5' (yellow card) 13' (yellow-red card); Ristovski (yellow card) 14'; Ghezzal (yellow card) 35'; Ceppitelli (yellow card) 39'; Claiton (yellow card) 45'; Iunco (yellow card) 66'	Stadium: Stadio Romeo Menti; Attendance: 8,322; Referee: Maurizio Mariani

9 March 2013 30	A.S. Bari	2–0	Juve Stabia	Bari
15:00	Tallo Gadji 52', 82'; Iunco (yellow card) 69'; Ristovski (yellow card) 73'	Summary	Jerry Mbakogu (yellow card) 90+1'	Stadium: Stadio San Nicola; Attendance: 6,102; Referee: Gennaro Palazzino

16 March 2013 31	Brescia	1–1	A.S. Bari	Brescia
15:00	Corvia 54'; Budel (yellow card) 56'	Summary	Ghezzal 14' (yellow card) 31'; Tallo Gadji (yellow card) 27'	Stadium: Stadio Mario Rigamonti; Attendance: 5,000; Referee: Riccardo Pinzani

19 March 2013 32	A.S. Bari	3–0	Padova	Bari
20:45	Caputo 39' 64' (pen.); Iunco (yellow card) 42'; Ghezzal 44'	Summary	Trevisan (yellow card) 63'; Dellafiore (red card) 63'; Viviani (yellow card) 76'	Stadium: Stadio San Nicola; Attendance: 6,099; Referee: Gianluca Manganiello

24 March 2013 33	Empoli	0–1	A.S. Bari	Empoli
20:45	Accardi (yellow card) 38'; Vincent Laurini (yellow card) 42'	Summary	Iunco (red card) 26'; Caputo (yellow card) 41'; Polenta (yellow card) 47'; Romizi 64'; Defendi (yellow card) 66'	Stadium: Stadio Carlo Castellani; Attendance: 2,840; Referee: Renzo Candussio

28 March 2013 34	A.S. Bari	1–1	Livorno	Bari
20:45	Romizi (yellow card) 45+1'; Daniele Sciaudone (yellow card) 75'; Polenta (yellow card) 81'; Francesco Fedato 87'	Summary	Belingheri 15'	Stadium: Stadio San Nicola; Referee: Aleandro Di Paolo

5 April 2013 35	Reggina	1–0	A.S. Bari	Reggio Calabria
20:45	Di Michele 1'; Hetemaj (yellow card) 9'; Barillà (yellow card) 82'; Rizzato (yellow card) 87'	Summary	Romizi (yellow card) 19'	Stadium: Stadio Oreste Granillo; Referee: Maurizio Ciampi

13 April 2013 36	A.S. Bari	4–3	Virtus Lanciano	Bari
15:00	Iunco (yellow card) 24'; Polenta (yellow card) 39'; Daniele Sciaudone 49' (yellow card) 73'; Caputo 63'; Defendi 67'; Tallo Gadji 69'; Lamanna (yellow card) 77'	Summary	Federico Amenta 1' (yellow card) 86'; Minotti (yellow card) 31'; Falcinelli 36' (yellow card) 37'; Piccolo 46'; Aquilanti (yellow card) 88' (yellow-red card)	Stadium: Stadio San Nicola; Attendance: 8,409; Referee: (Italy) Emilio Ostinelli

16 April 2013 37	Modena	0–0	A.S. Bari	Modena
20:45	Moretti (yellow card) 81'; Osuji (yellow card) 81'; Ardemagni (yellow card) 90+5'	Summary	Claiton (yellow card) 57'; Francesco Fedato (yellow card) 66'	Stadium: Stadio Alberto Braglia; Attendance: 2,168; Referee: (Italy) Francesco Castrignano

20 April 2013 38	Sassuolo	2–1	A.S. Bari	Modena
15:00	Pavoletti 23'; Magnanelli (yellow card) 58'; Longhi (yellow card) 78'; Terranova 79'	Summary	Ceppitelli (yellow card) 38'; Polenta (yellow card) 67'; Defendi 73' (yellow card) 77'; Claiton (red card) 90+1'	Stadium: Stadio Alberto Braglia; Attendance: 3,269; Referee: (Italy) Angelo Martino Giancola

27 April 2013 39	A.S. Bari	2–1	Spezia	Bari
15:00	Francesco Fedato (yellow card) 7' (goal) 64'; Daniele Sciaudone 34' (yellow card) 70'; Caputo (yellow card) 60'; Errico Altobello (red card) 89'	Summary	Porcari 61'; Mário Rui (yellow card) 77'	Stadium: Stadio San Nicola; Attendance: 8,568; Referee: (Italy) Massimiliano Irrati

4 May 2013 40	Novara	0–1	A.S. Bari	Novara
15:00	Seferovic (yellow card) 72'	Summary	Caputo 52'; Ghezzal (yellow card) 64'; Daniele Sciaudone (yellow card) 69'	Stadium: Stadio Silvio Piola; Attendance: 5,134; Referee: (Italy) Claudio Gavillucci

11 May 2013 41	A.S. Bari	2–1	Cesena	Bari
15:00	Bellomo (yellow card) 19'; Daniele Sciaudone (yellow card) 59'; Tallo Gadji (yellow card) 66'; Caputo (yellow card) 72' (goal) 88'; Ceppitelli 90'	Summary	Tonucci (yellow card) 51'; Morero 67' (yellow card) 72'	Stadium: Stadio San Nicola; Attendance: 9,673; Referee: (Italy) Federico La Penna

18 May 2013 42	Grosseto	4–3	A.S. Bari	Grosseto
14:30	Lupoli 18'; Coulibaly 49'; Piovaccari 65'; Edoardo Fanciulli 85'; Juri Marinelli (yellow card) 90+4'	Summary	Iunco (yellow card) 14'; Francesco Fedato (yellow card) 29' (goal) 46'; Ceppitelli 35'; Caputo 42'	Stadium: Stadio Olimpico Carlo Zecchini; Attendance: 1,254; Referee: (Italy) Gennaro Palazzino

=== Coppa Italia ===
Round 2	A.C. Perugia Calcio	4–1 (a.e.t.)	A.S. Bari	Perugia
20:30	Rantier (yellow card) 19'; Giampiero Clemente 42'; Matteo Politano (yellow card) 66'; Ciofani 97'; Fabinho 108', 112'; Romano Tozzi Borsoi (yellow card) 110'	Summary	González (yellow card) 31'; Albadoro 41'; Stefano Sabelli (yellow card) 63'; Ceppitelli (yellow card) 78' (yellow-red card) 81'; Caputo (red card) 81'	Stadium: Stadio Renato Curi; Attendance: 3,116; Referee: Angelo Martino Giancola
