= List of Italian football transfers summer 2011 (July) =

This is a list of Italian football transfers for the 2011–12 season. Only moves from Serie A and Serie B are listed. The summer transfer window began from 1 July 2011, the end of the 2010–11 season, with a few transfers taking place prior to the season's complete end.

== Summer transfer window ==
=== July ===
Date	Name	Nationality	Moving from	Moving to	Fee
1 July 2011	Mikael Antonsson	Sweden	(Denmark) Copenhagen	Bologna	Free
1 July 2011	Kevin Constant	Guinea	Chievo	Genoa	€7.8M
1 July 2011	Francesco Acerbi	Italy	Genoa	Chievo	Co-ownership, €2M
2011-07-01	Ferdinando Sforzini	Italy	Udinese	Grosseto	Undisclosed
2011-07-01	Marco Crimi	Italy	Bari	Grosseto	Co-ownership, Undisclosed
2011-07-01	Luca Caldirola	Italy	Cesena	Internazionale	Loan (Between co-owner)
2011-07-01	Luca Garritano	Italy	Cesena (youth)	Internazionale (youth)	Loan (Between co-owner)
2011-07-01	Samuele Longo	Italy	Genoa	Internazionale	Loan (Between co-owner)
2011-07-01	Joel Obi	Nigeria	Parma	Internazionale	Loan (Between co-owner)
2011-07-01	Stephan Lichtsteiner	Switzerland	Lazio	Juventus	€10M
1 July 2011	Abdoulay Konko	France	Genoa	Lazio	€4M
1 July 2011	Wilfred Osuji	Nigeria	Milan	Padova	Co-ownership, €310,000
1 July 2011	Enej Jelenič	Slovenia	Genoa (youth)	Padova	Co-ownership, €900,000
2011-07-01	Nebil Caidi	Italy	Cesena	Pavia	Co-ownership, Undisclosed
2011-07-01	Loris Bacchetti	Italy	Sampdoria (youth)	Pescara	Loan (between co-owner)
2011-07-01	Bruno Martella	Italy	Sampdoria (youth)	Pescara	Loan (between co-owner)
2011-07-01	Gianluca Di Chiara	Italy	Reggiana (youth)	Palermo	Co-ownership, €140,000
2011-07-01	Francesco Ardizzone	Italy	Palermo (youth)	Reggiana	Co-ownership, Undisclosed
2011-07-01	Adriano Siragusa	Italy	Palermo	Reggiana	Undisclosed
1 July 2011	Andrea Tozzo	Italy	Verona (youth)	Sampdoria (youth)	Co-ownership, €100,000
2011-07-01	Richmond Boakye	Ghana	Genoa (youth)	Sassuolo	Loan
2011-07-01	Isaac Cofie	Ghana	Genoa	Sassuolo	Loan
2011-07-01	Emanuele Terranova	Italy	Palermo	Sassuolo	Undisclosed
2011-07-01	Daniel Cappelletti	Italy	Palermo	Sassuolo	Loan
2011-07-01	Karim Laribi	Tunisia	Palermo	Sassuolo	Loan
2011-07-01	Mattia Destro	Italy	Genoa	Siena	Loan, €1.5M
2011-07-01	Daniele Pedrelli	Italy	Internazionale	Spezia	Co-ownership, Undisclosed
2011-07-01	Thierry Doubai	Côte d'Ivoire	(Switzerland) Young Boys	Udinese	Undisclosed
2011-07-01	Abdoulwhaid Sissoko	France	(France) Troyes	Udinese	Undisclosed
2011-07-01	Giacomo Tulli	Italy	Cesena	Vicenza	Loan (Between co-owner)
2011-07-01	Francesco Pitarresi	Italy	Palermo	(Belgium) Visé	Free
2011-07-01	Giuseppe Ingrassia	Italy	Palermo	(Belgium) Visé	?
2011-07-02	Stefano Pettinari	Italy	Roma	Crotone	Loan
2011-07-02	Nicola Sansone	Italy	(Germany) Bayern Munich	Parma	Free
2011-07-03	Mário Rui	Portugal	(Portugal) Benfica	Gubbio	Free
2011-07-03	Antonio Donnarumma	Italy	Milan	Gubbio	Undisclosed
2011-07-03	Marcel Büchel	Austria	Siena	Gubbio	Loan
2011-07-03	Alberto Almici	Italy	Atalanta (youth)	Gubbio	Loan
2011-07-04	Andrea Cocco	Italy	Cagliari	AlbinoLeffe	Loan
2011-07-04	Robert Maah	France	Como	Cittadella	Free
2011-07-04	Giuseppe Greco	Italy	Genoa	Modena	Loan (free agent in 2012)
2011-07-04	Marco Silvestri	Italy	Chievo (co-owned with Modena)	Reggiana	Loan
2011-07-04	Leonardo Talamonti	Argentina	Atalanta	(Argentina) Rosario Central	Free
2011-07-05	Víctor Ibarbo	Colombia	(Colombia) Atlético Nacional	Cagliari	Undisclosed
2011-07-05	Alex Cordaz	Italy	(Switzerland) Lugano	Cittadella	Undisclosed
2011-07-05	Vid Belec	Slovenia	Internazionale	Crotone	Loan
5 July 2011	Marco Benassi	Italy	Modena	Internazionale (youth)	Co-ownership, Undisclosed
5 July 2011	Federico Marchetti	Italy	Cagliari	Lazio	€5.2M
2011-07-05	Filippo Perucchini	Italy	Milan	Lecco	Loan
5 July 2011	Ricardo Ferreira	Portugal	(Portugal) Porto	Milan	Free
2011-07-05	Hasan Salihamidžić	Bosnia & Herzegovina	Juventus	(Germany) Wolfsburg	Free
2011-07-06	Matteo Calamai	Italy	Siena	Carpi	Loan
2011-07-06	Elia Cortesi	Italy	Atalanta (youth)	Carpi	?
2011-07-06	Michele Pellizzer	Italy	Bassano	Cittadella	Co-ownership, Undisclosed
6 July 2011	Luca Tedeschi	Italy	Parma	Crotone	Co-ownership, €500
2011-07-06	Stefan Ristovski	Macedonia	Parma	Crotone	Loan
2011-07-06	Raffaele Maiello	Italy	Napoli (youth)	Crotone	Loan
2011-07-06	Sebastián Ribas	Uruguay	(France) Dijon	Genoa	Free
2011-07-06	Orazio Urso	Italy	Catania (youth)	Milazzo	Co-ownership, Undisclosed
2011-07-06	Marco Cuomo	Italy	Catania (youth)	Milazzo	Loan
2011-07-06	Alessandro Malafronte	Italy	Catania (youth)	Milazzo	Loan
2011-07-06	Massimo Paci	Italy	Parma	Novara	Undisclosed
2011-07-06	Andrea Mantovani	Italy	Chievo	Palermo	€3.5M
2011-07-06	Valeri Bojinov	Bulgaria	Parma	(Portugal) Sporting CP	€2.6M + bonus (up to €0.9M) + 20% sell-on-fee
2011-07-06	Jaime Valdés	Chile	(Portugal) Sporting CP	Parma	Loan
2011-07-06	Gaetano Capogrosso	Italy	Siena	Pavia	Loan
2011-07-06	Filippo Bigeschi	Italy	Siena	Poggibonsi	Loan
2011-07-06	Giacomo Malquori	Italy	Siena	Poggibonsi	Loan
2011-07-06	Paolo Grossi	Italy	Varese	Siena	€1.1M
2011-07-06	Filipe	Brazil	Siena	Varese	Loan
2011-07-06	Filippo Carobbio	Italy	Siena	Spezia	Loan
6 July 2011	Danilo Russo	Italy	Genoa	Spezia	Co-ownership, €500
2011-07-07	Alessandro Lorusso	Italy	Sampdoria	Carpi	Loan
2011-07-07	Mirko Carretta	Italy	Andria	Chievo	Undisclosed
2011-07-07	Erwin Hoffer	Austria	Napoli	(Germany) Eintracht Frankfurt	Loan
2011-07-07	Ricardo Álvarez	Argentina	(Argentina) Vélez Sársfield	Internazionlae	US$17M + Bonus (€1M or 10% sell-on-fee)
2011-07-07	Francesco Rossi	Italy	Atalanta (youth)	Lumezzane	Loan
2011-07-07	Gerardo Strumbo	Italy	Catania (youth)	Milazzo	Loan
2011-07-07	Mattia Perin	Italy	Genoa (youth)	Padova	Loan
2011-07-07	Luca Meregalli	Italy	Milan	Pavia	Undisclosed
2011-07-07	Marco Gaeta	Italy	Milan	Renate	?
2011-07-07	Paolo Carminati	Italy	AlbinoLeffe (youth)	Renate	Co-ownership, Undisclosed
2011-07-07	Stefano Morotti	Italy	AlbinoLeffe (youth)	Renate	Co-ownership, Undisclosed
2011-07-07	Matteo Pisseri	Italy	Parma (youth)	Renate	Co-ownership, Undisclosed
2011-07-07	Ronny Valerio	Italy	Parma	Renate	Co-ownership, Undisclosed
2011-07-07	Gian Marco Ferrari	Italy	Parma	Renate	Loan
2011-07-07	Gaetano D'Agostino	Italy	Udinese	Siena	Co-ownership, €2.5M
7 July 2011	Thomas Albanese	Italy	Siena	South Tyrol	Loan, Free
7 July 2011	Matteo Gentili	Italy	Atalanta	Spezia	Loan
2011-07-07	Raffaele Bianco	Italy	Juventus	Spezia	Co-ownership, Undisclosed
8 July 2011	Claiton	Brazil	Varese	Bari	Free
8 July 2011	Oscar Branzani	Italy	Taranto	Cittadella (& Sampdoria, c)	€550,000
8 July 2011	Francesco Checcucci	Italy	Chievo	Crotone	Co-ownership, €210,000
8 July 2011	Emílson Cribari	Brazil	Napoli	(Brazil) Cruzeiro	Free
8 July 2011	Federico Gerardi	Italy	Udinese	Grosseto	Loan
8 July 2011	Francesco Bossa	Italy	Udinese	Grosseto	Loan
8 July 2011	Giovanni Formiconi	Italy	Udinese	Grosseto	Co-ownership, Undisclosed
8 July 2011	Savio	Germany	Fiorentina	Juve Stabia	Loan
8 July 2011	Aiman Napoli	Italy	Internazionale	Juve Stabia	Co-ownership, Undisclosed
8 July 2011	Cristiano Biraghi	Italy	Internazionale	Juve Stabia	Loan
8 July 2011	Antonio Zito	Italy	Siena	Juve Stabia	Free
8 July 2011	Jefferson	Brazil	Fiorentina	Latina	Loan
8 July 2011	Ameth Fall	Senegal	Cesena	Lecco	Undisclosed
8 July 2011	Attila Filkor	Hungary	Milan	Livorno	Loan
8 July 2011	Filippo Fondi	Italy	Chievo	Lumezzane	Co-ownership, Undisclosed
8 July 2011	Marco Bonassi	Italy	Juventus	Mantova	Co-ownership, Undisclosed
8 July 2011	Kastriot Dermaku	Albania	Sassuolo (youth)	Melfi	Co-ownership, Undisclosed
8 July 2011	Marco Bernacci	Italy	Bologna	Modena	Loan
8 July 2011	Andrea Mazzarani	Italy	Udinese	Novara	Loan
8 July 2011	Riccardo Meggiorini	Italy	Genoa	Novara	Loan
8 July 2011	Dejan Lazarevic	Slovenia	Genoa	Padova	Loan
8 July 2011	Simone Romagnoli	Italy	Milan	Pescara	Co-ownership, €150,000
8 July 2011	Federico Piovaccari	Italy	Cittadella	Sampdoria	€3.5M
8 July 2011	Giacomo Bassoli	Italy	Cesena (Co-ownership with Bologna)	Santarcangelo	Loan
8 July 2011	Simone Tonelli	Italy	Vicenza (& Cesena)	Santarcangelo	Loan
8 July 2011	Angelo Gregorio	Italy	Bologna (& Cesena)	Santarcangelo	Loan
8 July 2011	Nicola Del Pivo	Italy	Cesena	Santarcangelo	Loan
8 July 2011	Daniele Ferri	Italy	Cesena (youth)	Santarcangelo	Loan
8 July 2011	Giorgio Schiavini	Italy	Sassuolo	Santarcangelo	Loan
8 July 2011	Alex Lodovisi	Italy	Sassuolo (youth)	Santarcangelo	Co-ownership, Undisclosed
8 July 2011	Lorenzo Laverone	Italy	Reggina	Sassuolo	Co-ownership, €280,000
8 July 2011	Željko Brkić	Serbia	Udinese	Siena	Loan
8 July 2011	Panagiotis Tachtsidis	Greece	Genoa	Verona	Loan
8 July 2011	Andrea Doninelli	Italy	Genoa	Verona	Loan
8 July 2011	Pierpaolo Taraschi	Italy	Torino (youth)	SPAL	Co-ownership, Undisclosed
9 July 2011	Douglas Packer	Brazil	Siena	(Brazil) Atlético Paranaense	Loan
2011-07-09	Donato Disabato	Italy	AlbinoLeffe	Pro Vercelli	Co-ownership
2011-07-09	Saverio Cartone	Italy	Siena	Borgo-a-Buggiano	Loan
2011-07-09	Lorenzo Checchi	Italy	Siena (youth)	Borgo-a-Buggiano	Loan
2011-07-09	Carlo Crociani	Italy	Siena	Borgo-a-Buggiano	Loan
2011-07-09	Marco Di Crescenzo	Italy	Siena	Borgo-a-Buggiano	Loan
2011-07-09	Samuele Mugelli	Italy	Siena	Borgo-a-Buggiano	Loan
2011-07-09	Federico Re	Italy	Siena	Borgo-a-Buggiano	Loan
2011-07-09	Francesco Stella	Italy	Siena	Borgo-a-Buggiano	Loan
2011-07-09	Saverio Cartone	Italy	Siena	Borgo-a-Buggiano	Loan
2011-07-09	Eder	Brazil	Empoli	Cesena	Undisclosed
2011-07-09	Gianluca Comotto	Italy	Fiorentina	Cesena	Free
2011-07-09	Alessandro Longhi	Italy	Triestina	Chievo	Undisclosed
2011-07-09	Alessandro Longhi	Italy	Chievo	Sassuolo	Co-ownership, Undisclosed
2011-07-09	Mato Jajalo	Croatia	Siena	(Germany) Cologne	undisclosed
2011-07-09	Jaime Romero	Spain	Udinese	Granada	Loan
2011-07-09	Salvatore Caturano	Italy	Empoli	Nocerina	Loan
2011-07-09	Ignacio Lores	Uruguay	(Uruguay) Defensor Sporting	Palermo	€2.8M
9 July 2011	Andrea Adamo	Italy	Palermo	Portogruaro	Loan
2011-07-09	Mattia Migani	Italy	Palermo (youth)	San Marino	Co-ownership, Undisclosed
2011-07-09	Michele Pieri	Italy	Palermo (youth)	San Marino	Loan
2011-07-09	Gabriele Angella	Italy	Udinese (co-owned with Empoli)	Siena	Loan
2011-07-09	Fabio Lamorte	Italy	Sampdoria	Viareggio	Co-ownership, €500
2011-07-10	Abdou Doumbia	France	Parma	Como	?
2011-07-10	Nicholas Allievi	Italy	AlbinoLeffe (youth)	FeralpiSalò	Co-ownership, Undisclosed
2011-07-10	Francesco Bianchetti	Italy	AlbinoLeffe (youth)	FeralpiSalò	Co-ownership, Undisclosed
2011-07-10	Mirko Sala	Italy	AlbinoLeffe (youth)	FeralpiSalò	Co-ownership, Undisclosed
2011-07-10	Paolo Branduani	Italy	AlbinoLeffe	FeralpiSalò	Co-ownership, Undisclosed
2011-07-10	Manuel Iori	Italy	Chievo	Torino	Loan
11 July 2011	Mattia Evangelisti	Italy	Cesena (co-owned with Vicenza)	Andria	Loan
11 July 2011	Sergio Contessa	Italy	Novara	Andria	Co-ownership, Undisclosed
11 July 2011	Federico Masi	Italy	Fiorentina (youth)	Bari	Co-ownership, €500
11 July 2011	Yonese Hanine	Italy	Chievo	Barletta	Loan
11 July 2011	Andrea Bagnai	Italy	Fiorentina (youth)	Carrarese	Co-ownership, €500
11 July 2011	Francesco Di Tacchio	Italy	Fiorentina	Juve Stabia	Loan
11 July 2011	Horacio Erpen	Argentina	Sorrento	Juve Stabia	Free
11 July 2011	Marius Stankevičius	Lithuania	Sampdoria	Lazio	Undisclosed
11 July 2011	Alessio Luciani	Italy	Lazio	Lumezzane	Co-ownership, Undisclosed
11 July 2011	Francesco Mancini	Italy	Lazio (youth)	Grosseto	Undisclosed
11 July 2011	Gökhan Inler	Switzerland	Udinese	Napoli	Undisclosed
11 July 2011	Takayuki Morimoto	Japan	Catania	Novara	Co-ownership, €2M
11 July 2011	Carlo Pinsoglio	Italy	Juventus	Pescara	Loan
11 July 2011	Amedeo Benedetti	Italy	Chievo	Pisa	Loan
11 July 2011	Luca Ghiringhelli	Italy	Milan (youth)	SPAL	Co-ownership, €1,000
11 July 2011	Niccolò Galli	Italy	Parma	Verona	Loan
2011-07-12	Luigi Vitale	Italy	Napoli	Bologna	Loan
2011-07-12	Davide Elia Ballardini	Italy	Cesena	Carrarese	Loan, Free
2011-07-12	Sacha Cori	Italy	Cesena	Carrarese	Co-ownership, €500
2011-07-12	Timothy Nocchi	Italy	Juventus	Carrarese	Loan
2011-07-12	Djibril Cissé	France	(Greece) Panathinaikos	Lazio	Undisclosed
2011-07-12	Simone Barone	Italy	Cagliari	Livorno	Free
12 July 2011	Massimo Bonanni	Italy	Pescara	Lugano (Switzerland)	Free
2011-07-12	Roberto Inglese	Italy	Chievo	Lumezzane	Loan
2011-07-12	Lucas Finazzi	Brazil	Chievo	Lumezzane	Loan
2011-07-12	Alessandro Bassoli	Italy	Chievo	Modena	Loan
2011-07-12	Mario Santana	Argentina	Fiorentina	Napoli	Free
2011-07-12	Roberto Colombo	Italy	Triestina	Napoli	Free
12 July 2011	Miguel Britos	Uruguay	Bologna	Napoli	€9M
2011-07-12	Zé Eduardo	Brazil	(Brazil) Maga	Parma	?
12 July 2011	Michele Marconi	Italy	Atalanta	SPAL	Co-ownership, €500
12 July 2011	Davide Colomba	Italy	SPAL	Parma	€450,000 (Pambianchi + Vecchi)
12 July 2011	Francesco Pambianchi	Italy	Parma	SPAL	Co-ownership, €250,000 (swap with Colomba)
12 July 2011	Alessandro Vecchi	Italy	Parma	SPAL	Co-ownership, €200,000 (swap with Colomba)
12 July 2011	Davide Colomba	Italy	Parma	Crotone	Loan, Free
12 July 2011	Cristian Bertani	Italy	Novara	Sampdoria	€1.1M
12 July 2011	Kamil Glik	Poland	Palermo	Torino	co-ownership, €300,000
12 July 2011	Matteo Darmian	Italy	Palermo (co-owned with Milan)	Torino	Loan, Free
2011-07-12	Luca Righini	Italy	Vicenza (co-owned with Cesena)	Valenzana	Loan
2011-07-12	Cristián Zapata	Colombia	Udinese	(Spain) Villarreal	Undisclosed
2011-07-13	Alessandro Malomo	Italy	Prato	AlbinoLeffe	€100,000 (co-ownership with Roma)
2011-07-13	Stefano Lucchini	Italy	Sampdoria	Atalanta	Free
2011-07-13	Fernando Forestieri	Italy	Udinese	Bari	Loan
2011-07-13	Zdeněk Zlámal	Czech Republic	Udinese	Bari	Co-ownership, Undisclosed
13 July 2011	Paolo Frascatore	Italy	Roma (youth)	Benevento	Loan
13 July 2011	Mattia Montini	Italy	Roma (youth)	Benevento	Loan
2011-07-13	Lorenzo Tafi	Italy	Fiorentina	Borgo-a-Buggiano	Co-ownership, €500
2011-07-13	Max Taddei	Italy	Fiorentina (youth)	Carrarese	Loan
2011-07-13	Davide Nocciola	Italy	Pro Patria	Chievo	Undisclosed
2011-07-13	John Arne Riise	Norway	Roma	(England) Fulham	€2.625M
2011-07-13	Gianluigi Bianco	Italy	Sampdoria	Grosseto	Loan
2011-07-13	Alberto Gerbo	Italy	Internazionale	Gubbio	Co-ownership, Undisclosed
2011-07-13	Simone Benedetti	Italy	Internazionale (youth) (co-owned with Torino)	Gubbio	Loan
2011-07-13	Kristian Kraus	Slovenia	Siena (youth)	Gubbio	Loan
2011-07-13	Luca Viviani	Italy	Verona (youth)	Lecco	?
2011-07-13	Federico Carraro	Italy	Fiorentina (youth)	Modena	Loan
13 July 2011	Ivan Pelizzoli	Italy	Cagliari	Padova	Free
2011-07-13	Paolo Beatrizzotti	Italy	Castelfranco	Parma	Free
2011-07-13	Paolo Beatrizzotti	Italy	Parma	Santarcangelo	Co-ownership, Undisclosed
2011-07-13	Kadir Caidi	Italy	Bologna (& Cesena)	Santarcangelo	Loan
2011-07-13	Migjen Basha	Switzerland	Atalanta	Torino	Loan
14 July 2011	Manuel Scavone	Italy	Novara	Bari	Undisclosed
14 July 2011	Tommaso Morosini	Italy	AlbinoLeffe	Bassano	Co-ownership, Undisclosed
14 July 2011	José Ángel Crespo	Spain	Padova	Bologna	Undisclosed
14 July 2011	Federico Agliardi	Italy	Padova	Bologna	Undisclosed
14 July 2011	Daniele Vantaggiato	Italy	Padova	Bologna	Loan
14 July 2011	Luca Belcastro	Italy	Juventus (youth)	Carrarese	Co-ownership, Undisclosed
14 July 2011	Antonio Tognarelli	Italy	Empoli (youth)	Carrarese	Co-ownership, Undisclosed
14 July 2011	Max Taddei	Italy	Fiorentina (youth)	Carrarese	Loan
14 July 2011	Andrea Rabito	Italy	Padova	Cremonese	Free
14 July 2011	Giuseppe Caccavallo	Italy	Lecce	Crotone	Undisclosed
14 July 2011	Simone Mirante	Italy	Giulianova	Crotone	Undisclosed
14 July 2011	Alberto Galuppo	Italy	Parma	Foligno	Loan
14 July 2011	Alessio Manzoni	Italy	Parma	Frosinone	Loan
14 July 2011	Pietro Baccolo	Italy	Parma	Frosinone	Loan
14 July 2011	Alessio De Bode	Italy	Genoa (youth)	Juve Stabia	Loan
14 July 2011	Stefano Russo	Italy	Parma	Nocerina	Loan
14 July 2011	Jonathan	Brazil	(Brazil) Santos	Internazionale	Undisclosed
14 July 2011	Mattia Marchi	Italy	South Tyrol	Novara	Undisclosed
14 July 2011	Alejandro Rodriguez	Spain	Cesena (youth)	Pavia	Loan
14 July 2011	Luca Anania	Italy	Pro Patria	Pescara	Undisclosed
14 July 2011	Davide Bassi	Italy	Empoli	Sassuolo	Loan
14 July 2011	Luca Santonocito	Italy	Milan (youth)	South Tyrol	Loan
14 July 2011	Alessandro Iacobucci	Italy	Siena (youth)	South Tyrol	Loan
14 July 2011	Giuseppe Vives	Italy	Lecce	Torino	Undisclosed
14 July 2011	Nicola Capellini	Italy	Bologna (youth)	Valenzana	Loan
14 July 2011	Roberto Stillo	Canada	Genoa (youth)	Valenzana	Loan
2011-07-15	Alessandro Sbaffo	Italy	Chievo	Ascoli	Loan
2011-07-15	Umberto Miello	Italy	Torino	Como	Loan
2011-07-15	Luigi Palumbo	Italy	Cesena (& Parma)	Fondi	Loan
2011-07-15	Dani Benítez	Spain	Udinese	(Spain) Granada	Loan
2011-07-15	Antonio Caracciolo	Italy	Genoa	Gubbio	Loan
2011-07-15	Ettore Mendicino	Italy	Lazio	Gubbio	Loan
2011-07-15	Marco Costantino	Italy	Juventus (youth)	Latina	Loan
2011-07-15	Matteo Lanzoni	Italy	Sampdoria	Foggia	Loan
2011-07-15	Simone Zaza	Italy	Sampdoria	Juve Stabia	Loan
2011-07-15	Lorik Cana	Albania	(Turkey) Galatasaray	Lazio	peppercorn (exchanged with Muslera
2011-07-15	Fernando Muslera	Uruguay	Lazio	(Turkey) Galatasaray	peppercorn (exchanged with Cana, €6.75M to Montevideo Wanderers)
2011-07-15	Moris Carrozzieri	Italy	Palermo	Lecce	Free
2011-07-15	Achille Coser	Italy	Ascoli	Novara	Undisclosed
2011-07-15	Simone Pesce	Italy	Ascoli	Novara	Undisclosed
2011-07-15	Doni	Brazil	Roma	(England) Liverpool	Free
2011-07-15	Lorenzo Cinque	Italy	Lazio	Mantova	Co-ownership, Undisclosed
2011-07-15	Stefano Del Sante	Italy	Varese	Mantova	Undisclosed
2011-07-15	Diego Farias	Brazil	Chievo	Nocerina	Loan
2011-07-15	Simone Malatesta	Italy	Parma	Pro Vercelli	Loan
2011-07-15	Pablo Granoche	Uruguay	Chievo	Novara	Loan
2011-07-15	Mattia Marchi	Italy	Novara	Pavia	Co-ownership, Undisclosed
15 July 2011	Mavillo Gheller	Italy	Novara	Pavia	Free
2011-07-15	Riccardo Capogna	Italy	Parma	Renate	Loan
2011-07-15	Alessio Grea	Italy	Genoa	South Tyrol	Loan
2011-07-15	Gianluca Sansone	Italy	Siena	Sassuolo	Co-ownership, €425,000
2011-07-15	Stefano Guberti	Italy	Roma	Torino	Loan
15 July 2011	Andrea Manfredi	Italy	Genoa	Valenzana	Co-ownership, €500
15 July 2011	Luca Miracoli	Italy	Genoa (youth)	Valenzana	Co-ownership, €500
2011-07-15	Pierangelo Tarantino	Italy	Bari	Viareggio	Loan
2011-07-16	Mattia Minesso	Italy	Vicenza	Andria	?
2011-07-16	Giacomo Beretta	Italy	Genoa (youth, co-owned with Milan)	Ascoli	Loan
2011-07-16	Alessandro Romeo	Italy	Sampdoria	Ascoli	Loan
2011-07-16	Tommaso Scuffia	Italy	Fiorentina	Melfi	Free
2011-07-16	Stefano Fortunato	Italy	Pro Patria	Modena	Free
2011-07-16	Luigi Giorgi	Italy	Ascoli	Novara	Undisclosed
2011-07-16	Giulio Donati	Italy	Internazionale	Padova	Loan
2011-07-16	Raffaele Schiavi	Italy	Vicenza	Parma	Undisclosed
2011-07-16	Marco Pisano	Italy	Parma	Vicenza	Undisclosed
2011-07-16	Raffaele Schiavi	Italy	Parma	Padova	Loan
2011-07-16	Christian Manfredini	Côte d'Ivoire	Lazio	Sambonifacese	Free
2011-07-17	Mirco Gasparetto	Italy	Chievo	Lumezzane	Undisclosed
2011-07-18	Dario Toninelli	Italy	Varese (youth)	Latina	Loan
2011-07-18	Cristiano Ancora	Italy	Varese	Latina	Loan
2011-07-18	Paolo Marchi	Italy	Varese (youth)	Carpi	Loan
2011-07-18	Guido Davì	Italy	Palermo	Juve Stabia	Undisclosed
2011-07-18	Daniele Ragatzu	Italy	Cagliari	Gubbio	Loan
2011-07-18	Raffaele Alcibiade	Italy	Juventus	Nocerina	Co-ownership, Undisclosed
2011-07-18	Diego Manzoni	Italy	Genoa	Parma	Loan (Between co-owner)
2011-07-18	Nicola Lanzolla	Italy	Catania	Pisa	Co-ownership, €35,000
2011-07-18	Francesco Nicastro	Italy	Catania (youth)	Pisa	Loan
2011-07-18	Edgar Çani	Albania	Palermo	(Poland) Polonia Warsaw	Undisclosed
2011-07-18	Souleymane Coulibaly	Senegal	Siena (youth)	(England) Tottenham Hotspur	Free
19 July 2011	Nicola Maniero	Italy	Padova	Bassano	Loan
2011-07-19	Robert Acquafresca	Italy	Genoa	Bologna	Loan
19 July 2011	Vlada Avramov	Serbia	Fiorentina	Cagliari	Free
19 July 2011	Simone Gozzi	Italy	Modena	Cagliari	Loan, Undisclosed
2011-07-19	Keko	Spain	(Spain) Atlético Madrid	Catania	Undisclosed
2011-07-19	Kevin Vinetot	France	Genoa	Crotone	Loan (Between co-owner)
2011-07-19	Rodney Strasser	Sierra Leone	Milan	Lecce	Loan
2011-07-19	Santiago García	Argentina	Palermo	Novara	Loan
2011-07-19	Crescenzo Liccardo	Italy	Napoli	Portogruaro	Loan
19 July 2011	José Ángel	Spain	(Spain) Sporting Gijon	Roma	€4.5M + €0.5M bonus + 10% selling profit
19 July 2011	Nicola Ferrari	Italy	Sassuolo	South Tyrol	Co-ownership, €500
2011-07-19	Walter Guerra	Italy	Napoli (youth)	Viareggio	Loan
20 July 2011	Tiago	Portugal	Juventus	(Spain) Atlético Madrid	Free
20 July 2011	Alexis Sánchez	Chile	Udinese	(Spain) Barcelona	€26M + bonus (up to €11.5M)
20 July 2011	Tommaso Berni	Italy	Lazio	(Portugal) Braga	Free
2011-07-20	Fabio Concas	Italy	Varese	Carpi	Co-ownership, Undisclosed
2011-07-20	Marc Lewandowski	France	Padova	Como	Undisclosed
20 July 2011	Massimo Loviso	Italy	Torino	Crotone	Free
2011-07-20	Nicolao Dumitru	Italy	Napoli	Empoli	Loan (between co-owner)
20 July 2011	Nicola Pasini	Italy	Milan (youth)	Genoa	Co-ownership, €1.65M
20 July 2011	Matteo Chinellato	Italy	Genoa	Milan	Co-ownership, €1.75M
2011-07-20	Simone Colombi	Italy	Atalanta	Juve Stabia	Loan
2011-07-20	Matteo Scozzarella	Italy	Atalanta	Juve Stabia	Loan
2011-07-20	Gael Genevier	France	Siena	Livorno	Loan
20 July 2011	Jasmin Handanovič	Slovenia	Empoli	(Slovenia) Maribor	Free
2011-07-20	Jefferson	Brazil	Udinese	Modena	Loan
2011-07-20	Fabinho	Brazil	Udinese	Modena	Loan
2011-07-20	Nicholas Caglioni	Italy	Salernitana	Modena	Free
2011-07-20	Pellegrino Albanese	Italy	Sassuolo	Mantova	Co-ownership, Undisclosed
2011-07-20	Andrea Vignali	Italy	Sassuolo	Mantova	Co-ownership, Undisclosed
2011-07-20	Gianluca Lapadula	Italy	Parma	San Marino	Loan
2011-07-20	Niko Bianconi	Italy	Juventus (youth)	Vicenza	Loan (between co-owner)
July 21, 2011	Louise Essengue Parfait	Cameroon	Genoa	Ascoli	Loan
2011-07-21	Rivaldo	Paraguay	(Argentina) Patronato	Bari	Free
2011-07-21	Antonio Candreva	Italy	Udinese	Cesena	Loan
2011-07-21	Enrico Alfonso	Italy	Internazionale (co-owned with Chievo)	Cremonese	Loan
2011-07-21	Gianni Munari	Italy	Palermo	Fiorentina	€0.8M
2011-07-21	Andrea Seculin	Italy	Fiorentina	Juve Stabia	Loan
2011-07-21	Stefano Garzon	Italy	Verona	Lecco	Undisclosed
2011-07-21	Kerlon	Brazil	Internazionale	(Brazil) Nacional de Nova Serrana	Loan
2011-07-21	Andrea Schenetti	Italy	Milan	South Tyrol	Loan
2011-07-21	Domenico Girardi	Italy	Chievo	Taranto	Co-ownership, Undisclosed
2011-07-21	Andrea Grieco	Italy	Sampdoria (youth)	Viareggio	Loan
2011-07-21	Davide Miani	Italy	Chievo (youth)	Triestina	Undisclosed
2011-07-21	Sokratis Papastathopoulos	Greece	Genoa	(Germany) Werder Bremen	Loan
2011-07-22	David Suazo	Honduras	Internazionale	Cagliari	Free
2011-07-22	Roberto Guana	Italy	Palermo	Cesena	Free
2011-07-22	Alex Sirri	Italy	Giacomense	Chievo	Undisclosed
2011-07-22	Davide Ferrari	Italy	Brescia	Como	Co-ownership, Undisclosed
2011-07-22	Davide Negretti	Italy	Sampdoria (youth)	Cuneo	Loan
2011-07-22	Andrea Lazzari	Italy	Cagliari	Fiorentina	Co-ownership, €3M
2011-07-22	Federico Frigerio	Italy	Novara (youth)	Foggia	Loan
2011-07-22	Felipe Melo	Brazil	Juventus	(Turkey) Galatasaray	Loan, €1.5M
2011-07-22	Daniel Ciofani	Italy	Parma	Gubbio	Loan
2011-07-22	Arturo Vidal	Chile	(Germany) Bayer Leverkusen	Juventus	€10.5M + bonus (up to €2M)
2011-07-22	Ignazio Carta	Italy	Cagliari (youth)	Latina	Loan
2011-07-22	Nicola Muratore	Italy	Sampdoria (youth)	Melfi	Co-ownership, €500
22 July 2011	Alex Benvenga	Italy	Varese	Pisa	Co-ownership, Undisclosed
2011-07-22	Gabriel Heinze	Argentina	(France) Marseille	Roma	Free
2011-07-22	Fabio Lucioni	Italy	Siena	Spezia	Loan
2011-07-22	Mattia Gallon	Italy	Cagliari (youth)	Treviso	Co-ownership, Undisclosed
2011-07-22	Edoardo Blondett	Italy	Sampdoria (youth)	Valenzana	Loan
2011-07-22	Filippo Maria Scardina	Italy	Roma	Viareggio	Loan
22 July 2011	Matteo Paro	Italy	Genoa	Vicenza	Loan (free agent in 2012)
23 July 2011	Alberto Filippini	Italy	Padova	Como	Undisclosed
23 July 2011	Nicholas Costantini	Italy	Genoa	Foligno	Free
23 July 2011	Leonardo Gatto	Italy	Atalanta (youth)	Pisa	Co-ownership, €250
23 July 2011	Bojan	Spain	(Spain) Barcelona	Roma	Loan (part of 2-year €12M mortgage)
23 July 2011	Francesco Zizzari	Italy	Reggina	Siracusa	Loan
2011-07-24	Luca Maccabiti	Italy	Brescia (youth)	Lumezzane	Co-ownership, Undisclosed
2011-07-24	Valerio Frasca	Italy	Roma	Pro Patria	
2011-07-24	Alessandro Visone	Italy	Ravenna	Parma	Free
2011-07-24	Alessandro Visone	Italy	Parma	Vigor Lamezia	?
2011-07-25	Andrea Masiello	Italy	Bari	Atalanta	Co-ownership, €3.5M
2011-07-25	Marino Defendi	Italy	Atalanta	Bari	€1M (part of A.Masiello)
2011-07-25	Giacomo Venturi	Italy	Bologna (youth)	Bellaria	Loan
25 July 2011	Domenico Franco	Italy	Salernitana	Chievo	Free
25 July 2011	Simone Vitale	Italy	Pescara	Frosinone	Co-ownership, €100,000
25 July 2011	Mario Artistico	Italy	Pescara	Frosinone	€130,000
25 July 2011	Antonio Bocchetti	Italy	Frosinone	Pescara	€170,000
2011-07-25	Pajtim Kasami	Switzerland	Palermo	(England) Fulham	Undisclosed
2011-07-25	Silvano Raggio Garibaldi	Italy	Genoa	Gubbio	Loan
2011-07-25	Andrea Sala	Italy	Pro Patria (youth)	Internazionale (youth)	Loan
2011-07-25	José Ernesto Sosa	Argentina	Napoli	(Ukraine) Metalist Kharkiv	Undisclosed
2011-07-25	Jérémy Ménez	France	Roma	(France) Paris Saint-Germain	€8M + €1M bonus
2011-07-25	Dorin Goian	Romania	Palermo	(Scotland) Rangers	Undisclosed
2011-07-25	Samuele Romeo	Italy	Palermo	Sorrento	Undisclosed
2011-07-25	Nicola Madonna	Italy	Atalanta	Spezia	Loan
2011-07-26	Andrea Gasparri	Italy	Parma	Fondi	Co-ownership, Undisclosed
2011-07-26	Abel Gigli	Italy	Parma	Fondi	?
2011-07-26	Domenico Iovinella	Italy	Parma (youth)	Fondi	?
2011-07-26	Daniele Bernasconi	Italy	Parma (youth)	Fondi	?
2011-07-26	Andrea Raimondi	Italy	Padova	Juve Stabia	Loan
2011-07-26	Jerry Mbakogu	Nigeria	Padova	Juve Stabia	Loan
2011-07-26	Diego Conson	Italy	Grosseto	Viareggio	Co-ownership, Undisclosed
2011-07-27	Lucas Correa	Argentina	Varese	Avellino	Free
2011-07-27	Nicola Pasini	Italy	Genoa	Carrarese	Loan
2011-07-27	Antonio Meola	Italy	Avellino	Livorno	Co-ownership, Undisclosed
2011-07-27	Emanuele Pesoli	Italy	Varese	Siena	Undisclosed
2011-07-27	Raffaele Pucino	Italy	Alessandria	Varese	Co-ownership, Undisclosed
28 July 2011	Francesco Rampi	Italy	Perugia	Livorno	Loan
2011-07-28	Simone D'Anna	Italy	Gela	Campobasso	Undisclosed (co-ownership with Fiorentina)
2011-07-28	Ledian Memushaj	Albania	Chievo	Carpi	Co-ownership, Undisclosed
2011-07-28	Júlio Sérgio	Brazil	Roma	Lecce	Loan
2011-07-28	Mohamed Sissoko	Mali	Juventus	(France) Paris Saint-Germain	€7M + €1M bonus
2011-07-28	Salvatore Sirigu	Italy	Palermo	(France) Paris Saint-Germain	Undisclosed
2011-07-28	Magnus Troest	Denmark	Genoa	Varese	Loan
2011-07-28	Alessandro Elia	Italy	Parma	Viareggio	Loan
2011-07-29	Sébastien Frey	France	Fiorentina	Genoa	Free
2011-07-29	Sebastiano Girelli	Italy	Sassuolo	Mantova	?
2011-07-29	Luigi Sepe	Italy	Napoli (youth)	Pisa	Loan
2011-07-29	Matteo Chinellato	Italy	Milan	South Tyrol	Loan
2011-07-30	Maximiliano Moralez	Argentina	(Argentina) Vélez Sársfield	Atalanta	Undisclosed
30 July 2011	Antonio Gammone	Italy	Bari (youth)	Chieti	Loan
2011-07-30	Antimo Iunco	Italy	Chievo	Spezia	Co-ownership, Undisclosed
2011-07-30	Uros Palibrk	Slovenia	Milan (youth)	Viareggio	Loan
2011-07-31	Jasmin Kurtić	Slovenia	Palermo	Varese	Loan

==== Notes ====
1. Player officially joined his new club on 1 July 2011.

Players who spent last season on loan were marked in Italic
