= 2010–11 Torino FC season =

Torino
2010–11 season
- Owner: Urbano Cairo
- Chairman: Urbano Cairo
- Manager: Franco Lerda (until 9 March 2011); Giuseppe Papadopulo (from 9 to 21 March); Franco Lerda (from 21 March)
- Serie B: 8th
- Coppa Italia: Third round
- Top goalscorer: League: Rolando Bianchi (19); All: Rolando Bianchi (19)
Home colours	Away colours	Third colours

During the 2010–11 season, the Italian football club Torino FC was placed eighth in the Serie B league and reached the third round of the Coppa Italia competition.

== Squad ==
=== First team ===
As of 31 January 2011.

Note: Flags indicate national team as defined under FIFA eligibility rules; some limited exceptions apply. Players may hold more than one non-FIFA nationality.

No.	Pos.	Nation	Player
1	GK	BRA	Rubinho (on loan from Palermo)
5	DF	ITA	Valerio Di Cesare
6	DF	ITA	Angelo Ogbonna
7	MF	ITA	Daniele De Vezze
8	MF	ITA	Alessandro Budel (on loan from Brescia)
9	FW	ITA	Rolando Bianchi (captain)
10	FW	ITA	Antimo Iunco
11	MF	NGA	Christian Obodo (on loan from Udinese)
14	FW	ITA	Alessandro Sgrigna
16	DF	ARG	Luciano Zavagno
18	MF	ITA	Andrea Gasbarroni
19	MF	ITA	Giuseppe De Feudis (on loan from Cesena)
20	FW	SVN	Dejan Lazarević (on loan from Genoa)
21	DF	ITA	Agostino Garofalo (on loan from Siena)
22	FW	ITA	Mirco Antenucci
27	MF	ITA	Paolo Zanetti

No.	Pos.	Nation	Player
30	FW	ITA	Umberto Miello
31	GK	ITA	Davide Morello
32	DF	ITA	Claudio Rivalta
39	DF	BEL	Luis Pedro Cavanda (on loan from Lazio)
41	GK	ITA	Davide Bassi (on loan from Empoli)
44	MF	SRB	Alen Stevanović
50	DF	ITA	Francesco Pratali
60	DF	ITA	Marco Chiosa
77	MF	ITA	Biagio Pagano
81	FW	ITA	Alessandro Pellicori (on loan from QPR)
88	DF	ITA	Danilo D'Ambrosio
90	FW	ITA	Gianmario Comi
92	DF	ITA	Filippo Scaglia
93	GK	ITA	Alfred Gomis
95	MF	ITA	Fabio Panepinto
99	FW	BRA	Denilson Gabionetta (on loan from SEV Hortolândia)

== Competitions ==
=== Serie B ===
==== League table ====
Pos	Team	Pld	W	D	L	GF	GA	GD	Pts	Promotion or relegation
6	Reggina	42	15	16	11	46	40	+6	61	Qualification to promotion play-offs
7	Livorno	42	15	14	13	49	46	+3	59	
8	Torino	42	15	13	14	49	48	+1	58	
9	Empoli	42	13	18	11	46	39	+7	57	
10	Modena	42	12	19	11	46	51	−5	55	

Source: Lega Serie B
Rules for classification: 1st points, 2nd head-to-head, 3rd goal difference, 4th goals for

==== Results summary ====
Overall								Home						Away					
Pld	W	D	L	GF	GA	GD	Pts	W	D	L	GF	GA	GD	W	D	L	GF	GA	GD
42	15	13	14	49	48	+1	58	10	5	6	28	24	+4	5	8	8	21	24	−3

Last updated: 29 May 2011.
Source: Competitive matches

==== Results by round ====
Round	1	2	3	4	5	6	7	8	9	10	11	12	13	14	15	16	17	18	19	20	21	22	23	24	25	26	27	28	29	30	31	32	33	34	35	36	37	38	39	40	41	42
Ground	H	A	H	A	H	A	H	A	H	A	H	H	A	H	A	H	A	H	A	H	A	A	H	A	H	A	H	A	H	A	H	A	A	H	A	H	A	H	A	H	A	H
Result	L	L	D	W	W	L	W	L	W	L	L	W	D	W	D	W	D	D	W	W	D	L	D	D	L	L	W	W	L	L	L	L	W	W	W	D	D	D	D	W	D	L
Position	18	22	20	16	10	15	10	12	10	11	13	11	10	8	10	8	8	7	7	5	6	7	7	6	8	10	7	7	7	7	11	12	8	7	5	5	6	6	6	6	7	8

Updated to match(es) played on 29 May 2011. Source: Competitive matches
A = Away; H = Home; W = Win; D = Draw; L = Loss

==== Matches ====
23 August 2010 1	Torino	1–2	Varese	Turin
20:45 CEST (UTC+02:00)	Obodo 45+1'		Buzzegoli 14'; Neto Pereira 35'	Stadium: Stadio Olimpico di Torino; Attendance: 14,590; Referee: Marco Guida

28 August 2010 2	Cittadella	2–1	Torino	Cittadella
18:30 CEST (UTC+02:00)	Nocentini 37'; Dalla Bona 41'		Iunco 19'	Stadium: Stadio Pier Cesare Tombolato; Attendance: 2,603; Referee: Nicola Stefanini

4 September 2010 3	Torino	1–1	Crotone	Turin
20:45 CEST (UTC+02:00)	Iunco 76'		Cutolo 48'	Stadium: Stadio Olimpico di Torino; Attendance: 11,105; Referee: Dino Tommasi

11 September 2010 4	Sassuolo	1–2	Torino	Modena
15:00 CEST (UTC+02:00)	Catellani 18'		Iunco 3'; Sgrigna 85'	Stadium: Stadio Alberto Braglia; Attendance: 3,150; Referee: Daniele Doveri

18 September 2010 5	Torino	1–0	Novara	Turin
15:00 CEST (UTC+02:00)	Bianchi 5'			Stadium: Stadio Olimpico di Torino; Attendance: 17,502; Referee: Leonardo Baracani

25 September 2010 6	Pescara	2–0	Torino	Pescara
15:00 CEST (UTC+02:00)	Soddimo 46'; Cascione 56'			Stadium: Stadio Adriatico; Attendance: 8,601; Referee: Renzo Candussio

2 October 2010 7	Torino	2–1	Portogruaro	Turin
15:00 CEST (UTC+02:00)	Bianchi 3'; Madaschi 48' (o.g.)		Altinier 57'	Stadium: Stadio Olimpico di Torino; Attendance: 9,102; Referee: Maurizio Ciampi

10 October 2010 8	Atalanta	2–1	Torino	Bergamo
20:45 CEST (UTC+02:00)	Padoin 6'; Tiribocchi 90+2'		Sgrigna 23'	Stadium: Stadio Atleti Azzurri d'Italia; Attendance: 20,322; Referee: Dino Tommasi

13 October 2010 9	Torino	2–1	Vicenza	Turin
20:45 CEST (UTC+02:00)	Bianchi 83' (pen.), 90+2'		De Vezze 20' (o.g.)	Stadium: Stadio Olimpico di Torino; Attendance: 9,268; Referee: Riccardo Pinzani

16 October 2010 10	Livorno	2–1	Torino	Livorno
15:00 CEST (UTC+02:00)	Tavano 19'; Luci 56'		Bianchi 66'	Stadium: Stadio Armando Picchi; Attendance: 5,265; Referee: Giampaolo Calvarese

23 October 2010 11	Torino	1–2	Frosinone	Turin
15:00 CEST (UTC+02:00)	Pratali 26'		Sansone 16'; Lodi 18'	Stadium: Stadio Olimpico di Torino; Attendance: 8,601; Referee: Massimiliano Velotto

1 November 2010 12	Torino	2–1	Ascoli	Turin
21:00 CET (UTC+01:00)	Sgrigna 27'; Iunco 66'		Moretti 2'	Stadium: Stadio Olimpico di Torino; Attendance: 8,306; Referee: Maurizio Ciampi

6 November 2010 13	Grosseto	0–0	Torino	Grosseto
15:00 CET (UTC+01:00)				Stadium: Stadio Carlo Zecchini; Attendance: 2,566; Referee: Angelo Giancola

9 November 2010 14	Torino	1–0	AlbinoLeffe	Turin
20:45 CET (UTC+01:00)	Bianchi 45+1'			Stadium: Stadio Olimpico di Torino; Attendance: 8,112; Referee: Renzo Candussio

13 November 2010 15	Reggina	1–1	Torino	Reggio Calabria
15:00 CET (UTC+01:00)	Bonazzoli 5'		Bianchi 13'	Stadium: Stadio Oreste Granillo; Attendance: 5,477; Referee: Marco Guida

20 November 2010 16	Torino	3–2	Modena	Turin
15:00 CET (UTC+01:00)	Sgrigna 3' (penalty missed) 41'; D'Ambrosio 55', 76'		Mazzarani 11'; Çani 24'	Stadium: Stadio Olimpico di Torino; Attendance: 7,965; Referee: Davide Massa

27 November 2010 17	Piacenza	1–1	Torino	Piacenza
15:00 CET (UTC+01:00)	Cacia 71'		De Vezze 8'	Stadium: Stadio Leonardo Garilli; Attendance: 3,056; Referee: Riccardo Pinzani

5 December 2010 18	Torino	1–1	Siena	Turin
12:30 CET (UTC+01:00)	De Vezze 13'		Brienza 86'	Stadium: Stadio Olimpico di Torino; Attendance: 12,512; Referee: Riccardo Tozzi

13 December 2010 19	Triestina	0–1	Torino	Trieste
20:45 CET (UTC+01:00)			Sgrigna 64'	Stadium: Stadio Nereo Rocco; Attendance: 4,554; Referee: Massimiliano Velotto

18 December 2010 20	Torino	2–1	Empoli	Turin
15:00 CET (UTC+01:00)	Iunco 48'; Pellicori 53'		Marzorati 74'	Stadium: Stadio Olimpico di Torino; Attendance: 9,322; Referee: Daniele Doveri

8 January 2011 21	Padova	1–1	Torino	Padua
20:45 CET (UTC+01:00)	Legati 70'		Bianchi 76'	Stadium: Stadio Euganeo; Attendance: 7,006; Referee: Nicola Stefanini

15 January 2011 22	Varese	3–0	Torino	Varese
15:00 CET (UTC+01:00)	Frara 45+1'; Claiton 48'; Concas 79'			Stadium: Stadio Franco Ossola; Attendance: 8,185; Referee: Dino Tommasi

22 January 2011 23	Torino	1–1	Cittadella	Turin
15:00 CET (UTC+01:00)	Bianchi 26'		D'Ambrosio 72' (o.g.)	Stadium: Stadio Olimpico di Torino; Attendance: 8,644; Referee: Piero Giacomelli

29 January 2011 24	Crotone	1–1	Torino	Crotone
15:00 CET (UTC+01:00)	Ginestra (penalty missed) 66'; Cutolo 76'		Bianchi 80'	Stadium: Stadio Ezio Scida; Attendance: 3,388; Referee: Leonardo Baracani

5 February 2011 25	Torino	1–2	Sassuolo	Turin
15:00 CET (UTC+01:00)	Bianchi 31' (pen.)		De Falco 55', 69' (pen.)	Stadium: Stadio Olimpico di Torino; Attendance: 9,128; Referee: Giampaolo Calvarese

14 February 2011 26	Novara	1–0	Torino	Novara
20:45 CET (UTC+01:00)	Garofalo 23' (o.g.)			Stadium: Stadio Silvio Piola; Attendance: 9,173; Referee: Maurizio Ciampi

19 February 2011 27	Torino	3–1	Pescara	Turin
15:00 CET (UTC+01:00)	De Vezze 34'; Antenucci 49'; Bianchi 76'		Diamoutene 12'; Sansovini (penalty missed) 89'	Stadium: Stadio Olimpico di Torino; Attendance: 7,894; Referee: Davide Massa

26 February 2011 28	Portogruaro	0–1	Torino	Portogruaro
15:00 CET (UTC+01:00)			Bianchi 20'	Stadium: Stadio Piergiovanni Mecchia; Attendance: 2,500; Referee: Nicola Stefanini

2 March 2011 29	Torino	1–2	Atalanta	Turin
20:45 CET (UTC+01:00)	Antenucci 11'		Peluso 12'; Bonaventura 90+4'	Stadium: Stadio Olimpico di Torino; Attendance: 13,475; Referee: Daniele Doveri

7 March 2011 30	Vicenza	1–0	Torino	Vicenza
19:00 CET (UTC+01:00)	Abbruscato 28' (pen.)			Stadium: Stadio Romeo Menti; Attendance: 7,258; Referee: Marco Guida

12 March 2011 31	Torino	0–2	Livorno	Turin
15:00 CET (UTC+01:00)			Tavano 56', 81' (pen.)	Stadium: Stadio Olimpico di Torino; Attendance: 8,363; Referee: Renzo Candussio

19 March 2011 32	Frosinone	1–0	Torino	Frosinone
15:00 CET (UTC+01:00)	Biasi 54'			Stadium: Stadio Matusa; Attendance: 3,603; Referee: Nicola Stefanini

26 March 2011 33	Ascoli	0–4	Torino	Ascoli Piceno
18:00 CET (UTC+01:00)	Giorgi (penalty missed) 49'		Bianchi 7', 45'; Faísca 46' (o.g.); Antenucci 65'	Stadium: Stadio Cino e Lillo Del Duca; Attendance: 7,640; Referee: Riccardo Pinzani

1 April 2011 34	Torino	1–0	Grosseto	Turin
20:45 CEST (UTC+02:00)	Antenucci 75'			Stadium: Stadio Olimpico di Torino; Attendance: 12,221; Referee: Davide Massa

9 April 2011 35	Albinoleffe	1–2	Torino	Bergamo
15:00 CEST (UTC+02:00)	Sala 51'		Pagano 20'; Antenucci 87'	Stadium: Stadio Atleti Azzurri d'Italia; Attendance: 2,528; Referee: Emiliano Gallione

18 April 2011 36	Torino	1–1	Reggina	Turin
20:45 CEST (UTC+02:00)	Bianchi 88'		Danti 22'	Stadium: Stadio Olimpico di Torino; Attendance: 19,159; Referee: Maurizio Ciampi

22 April 2011 37	Modena	1–1	Torino	Modena
19:00 CEST (UTC+02:00)	Stanco 13'		Bianchi 20'	Stadium: Stadio Alberto Braglia; Attendance: 7,069; Referee: Dino Tommasi

30 April 2011 38	Torino	1–1	Piacenza	Turin
15:00 CEST (UTC+02:00)	Bianchi 48' (pen.)		Guzmán 36'	Stadium: Stadio Olimpico di Torino; Attendance: 10,194; Referee: Luigi Nasca

7 May 2011 39	Siena	2–2	Torino	Siena
15:00 CEST (UTC+02:00)	Calaiò 10', 38'		Sgrigna 23'; Bianchi (penalty missed) 77' 80'	Stadium: Stadio Artemio Franchi; Attendance: 9,207; Referee: Davide Massa

14 May 2011 40	Torino	2–0	Triestina	Turin
15:00 CEST (UTC+02:00)	Antenucci 6'; De Feudis 81'			Stadium: Stadio Olimpico di Torino; Attendance: 9,868; Referee: Nicola Stefanini

20 May 2011 41	Empoli	1–1	Torino	Empoli
20:45 CEST (UTC+02:00)	Valdifiori 48'		Iunco 3'	Stadium: Stadio Carlo Castellani; Attendance: 4,667; Referee: Maurizio Ciampi

29 May 2011 42	Torino	0–2	Padova	Turin
15:00 CEST (UTC+02:00)			Cuffa 43' de Paula 80'	Stadium: Stadio Olimpico di Torino; Attendance: 24,244; Referee: Riccardo Pinzani

=== Coppa Italia ===
15 August 2010 Second round	Torino	3–1 (a.e.t.)	Cosenza	Turin
20:45 CEST (UTC+02:00)	Iunco 54' (pen.); Obodo 99' (pen.); Belingheri 104'		Biancolino 66'	Stadium: Stadio Olimpico di Torino; Attendance: 4,881; Referee: Emilio Ostinelli

28 October 2010 Third round	Bari	3–1	Torino	Bari
20:45 CEST (UTC+02:00)	Caputo 4'; Parisi 64' (pen.); Pulzetti 70'		Rossi 11' (o.g.)	Stadium: Stadio San Nicola; Attendance: 6,076; Referee: Carmine Russo
