= Francesco Mancini =

Francesco Mancini may refer to:

- Francesco Mancini (footballer, born 1968) (1968–2012), Italian footballer
- Francesco Mancini (footballer, born 1990), Italian footballer
- Francesco Mancini (1679–1758), Italian painter
- Francesco Mancini (1830–1905), Italian painter
- Francesco Longo Mancini (1880–1954), Italian painter

== Other ==
- Francesco Maria Mancini (1606–1672), Italian cardinal
- Francesco Mancini (composer) (1672–1737), Italian baroque composer from Naples
