= Conson =

Conson or Côn Sơn may refer to:

- Côn Sơn Island, an island located in Vietnam
- Diego Conson (born 1990), an Italian footballer
- List of storms named Conson, a list of tropical cyclones named after the island

== See also ==
- Conson Gymnasium, in Qingdao, China
- Conson Stadium, in Qingdao, China
