= Idriz Toskić =

Italian-born Montenegrin footballer

Personal information
- Date of birth: 12 October 1995 (age 31)
- Place of birth: Molfetta, Italy
- Height: 1.76 m (5 ft 9 in)
- Position: Defensive midfielder

Team information
- Current team: Budoni

Youth career
- 2002–2006: Ostuni
- 2006–2013: Bari

Senior career*
Years	Team	Apps	(Gls)
2012–2013	Bari	15	(0)
2013–2015	Chievo	1	(0)
2015	→ Monza (loan)	8	(0)
2016–2017	Dečić	21	(0)
2017–2018	Bisceglie	33	(0)
2019	Skënderbeu	7	(0)
2019–2020	Kom	4	(0)
2020–2021	Nuova Florida	14	(1)
2021	Gravina	14	(1)
2021–2022	Sona	21	(1)
2022	Jezero	2	(0)
2022	Nuova Florida	11	(0)
2022–2023	Roma City	2	(0)
2023	Gioiese	10	(0)
2023–	Budoni	1	(0)

International career
2013	Montenegro U19	2	(0)
2013–2015	Montenegro U20	11	(0)
2015	Montenegro U21	2	(0)
- * Club domestic league appearances and goals as of 20 December 2023

Idriz Toskić (born 12 October 1995) is an Italian-born Montenegrin footballer who plays as a defensive midfielder for Serie D club Budoni. Toskić has played for the Montenegro U-17 and U-19 national football teams.

Toskić was born in Molfetta, 25 km from Bari, and holds Italian citizenship.

== Career ==
=== Club career ===
In July 2013 Toskić was sold to Chievo outright for €320,000. However, on 1 September 2013 Bari bought him back in a co-ownership deal for €250,000, signing a 5-year contract. He returned to Chievo in a temporary deal immediately. In June 2014 Chievo bought Toskić outright, for €400,000, with Andrea De Falco moved to opposite direction also for €400,000. In January 2015 Toskić was signed by Monza in a temporary deal.

In January 2020, Toskić returned to Italy and joined Serie D club Team Nuova Florida.
