= Nicola Bellomo (footballer) =

Italian footballer (born 1991)

Personal information
- Date of birth: 18 February 1991 (age 35)
- Place of birth: Bari, Italy
- Height: 1.74 m (5 ft 8 1/2 in)
- Position: Attacking midfielder

Youth career
- 2007–2010: Bari

Senior career*
Years	Team	Apps	(Gls)
2009–2012	Bari	18	(2)
2010	→ Lucchese (loan)	1	(0)
2010–2011	→ Barletta (loan)	33	(6)
2012–2013	Chievo	0	(0)
2012–2013	→ Bari (loan)	34	(6)
2013–2014	Torino	7	(1)
2014	→ Spezia (loan)	21	(5)
2014–2017	Chievo	5	(0)
2015	→ Bari (loan)	19	(2)
2015–2016	→ Ascoli (loan)	12	(1)
2016–2017	→ Vicenza (loan)	42	(4)
2017	Alessandria	14	(0)
2018	Sambenedettese	17	(1)
2018–2019	Salernitana	1	(0)
2019–2022	Reggina	103	(10)
2022–2026	Bari	77	(5)

International career
2009	Italy U19	1	(0)
2011	Italy U20	1	(0)
2012–2013	Italy U21 Serie B	4	(1)
- * Club domestic league appearances and goals as of 12 May 2026

Nicola Bellomo (born 18 February 1991) is an Italian professional footballer who plays as an attacking midfielder.

== Club career ==
=== Bari ===
Born in Bari, he began his football career with hometown club A.S. Bari, entering the youth system. He made his debut at the end of the 2008–09 Serie B season, on 16 May 2009, replacing Daniele De Vezze in a 4–1 win against Modena. He was confirmed for the first team the following season, but never played; instead, he continued to play with the youth team.

In July 2010, he was loaned to Lucchese along with Alessandro Marotta, but in August moved to Barletta. He played the league first match as substitute, replaced defender Alessio Lanotte (that match Barletta played a 4-3-3 formation) and started as the attacking midfielder in the next round (4-3-1-2 formation). He was the playmaker in 4-3-1-2 formation or one of the supporting striker in 4-3-2-1 formation.

On 1 July 2011, he signed a new 3-year contract with Bari.

=== Chievo and return to Bari ===
On 27 August 2012, half of the registration rights of Bellomo was sold to Chievo for €1.75 million (€350,000 cash plus half of the registration rights of Andrea De Falco). Bellomo immediately returned to Bari in temporary deal.

=== Torino ===
On 3 July 2013, Bellomo was sold to Serie A club Torino for €1.2 million with Chievo retaining 50% of his registration rights in co-ownership. He made his debut for the Granata during the third round of the 2013–14 Coppa Italia against Pescara, lost 1–2, and in Serie A on 25 September playing a full match against Hellas Verona, 2–2. On 20 October he scored his first goal in Serie A from a free kick to draw Torino level against Inter Milan in the 90th minute and the match ended 3–3. In a post-match interview Bellomo dedicated the goal to his late father.

Bellomo made 7 appearances for Torino during the 2013–14 season before he was loaned to Spezia in Serie B on 29 January 2014.

==== Spezia (loan) ====
At Spezia, he was given the number 10 shirt, making his debut on 1 February 2014 in a draw 1–1 against Juve Stabia. After contributing two assists on 15 February at home against Crotone (3–1), he scored his first goal for the Aquilotti on 22 March against Brescia (won 2–0). He scored again on 12 April away to Cesena (2–0), before deciding the following match against Siena, 1–0. He was decisive again on 3 May, scoring the 2–1 against Regina, bringing Spezia into the play-off zone of the league table. With Spezia, he played in the quarter-finals of the promotional play-offs, losing 1–0 to Modena. He concluded the season with 21 appearances and 5 goals.

=== Return to Chievo ===
On 21 June 2014, the co-ownership between Chievo and Torino was resolved in favour of the former for a fee of €343,000.

==== Bari (loan) ====
On 29 January 2015, Bellomo returned to Bari for the remainder of the 2014–15 Serie B season.

==== Ascoli (loan) ====
On 21 September 2015, Bellomo joined Serie B newcomer Ascoli.

==== Vicenza (loan) ====
On 21 January 2016, Bellomo was signed by Vicenza on loan for 1 1/2 seasons.

=== Return to Bari ===
On 26 July 2022, Bellomo returned to Bari on a two-year contract.

== International career ==
After several call-ups to Italy U18, with whom, he failed to play, he debuted for the Italy U19 on 22 September 2009 in a friendly match lost 4–1 against Denmark. On 9 February 2011, he played for the Italy U20 in a game lost 3–1 against Germany (of the same age group). In April 2013, he was called up to the Italy U21 (along with teammates Francesco Fedato and Stefano Sabelli) by coach Devis Mangia in view of the 2013 UEFA European Under-21 Championship in Israel.

He has also represented the Italy under-21 Serie B representative team, replacing Fabrizio Paghera against a Russian First League selection. From 10–12 March 2014, he was called up by the head coach of the senior national team, Cesare Prandelli, in order to evaluate young players ahead of the 2014 World Cup.

== Style of play ==
Bellomo began as a central midfielder, but in recent seasons at Bari was often employed in a playmaking role. He is right-footed, with a good shot from distance and competent at set pieces. Said to be inspired by Marco Verratti.

== Honours ==
=== Club ===
Bari

- Serie B (1): 2009
