= Fabio Giordano =

Italian footballer

Personal information
- Full name: Fabio Marco Giordano
- Date of birth: 6 February 1983 (age 43)
- Place of birth: Palermo, Sicily, Italy
- Height: 1.77 m (5 ft 10 in)
- Position: Midfielder

Senior career*
Years	Team	Apps	(Gls)
2002–2005	Torino	0	(0)
2002–2003	→ Pisa (loan)	1	(0)
2003–2004	→ Vis Pesaro (loan)	24	(0)
2005	→ Sassari Torres (loan)	9	(0)
2005–2008	Foggia	71	(3)
2008–2011	Cittadella	11	(0)
2009	→ Pescara (loan)	13	(0)
2009–2010	→ Ravenna (loan)	24	(0)
2011–2012	Sarego	10	(1)
2012	Matera	1	(0)
2012–2014	Kras Repen		
2014–2017	Jesolo		
Total		164	(4)
- * Club domestic league appearances and goals

Fabio Marco Giordano (born 6 February 1983) is an Italian former footballer who plays as a midfielder.

== Career ==
Born in Palermo, Sicily, Giordano started his career with northern Italy side Torino Calcio. He was part of the 2001–02 Primavera Under-20 team and then loaned to Pisa and Vis Pesaro. In the 2004–05 season, he returned to Turin and awarded the number 16 shirt. He was transferred to Sassari Torres again in January 2005. After the bankrupt of Torino and all players were allowed to leave, and Giordano joined Foggia of Serie C1.

In July 2008, he joined newly promoted Serie B side Cittadella, but loaned to Pescara on 2 February. Luca Di Matteo took his number seven shirt in the second half of the 2008–09 season.

Giordano returned to Cittadella in the 2009–10 season and played the opening match as starter, but on 31 August 2009 loaned to Ravenna. Antimo Iunco, on loan from Chievo, took his number seven shirt.
