= Agostino Garofalo =

Italian footballer (born 1984)

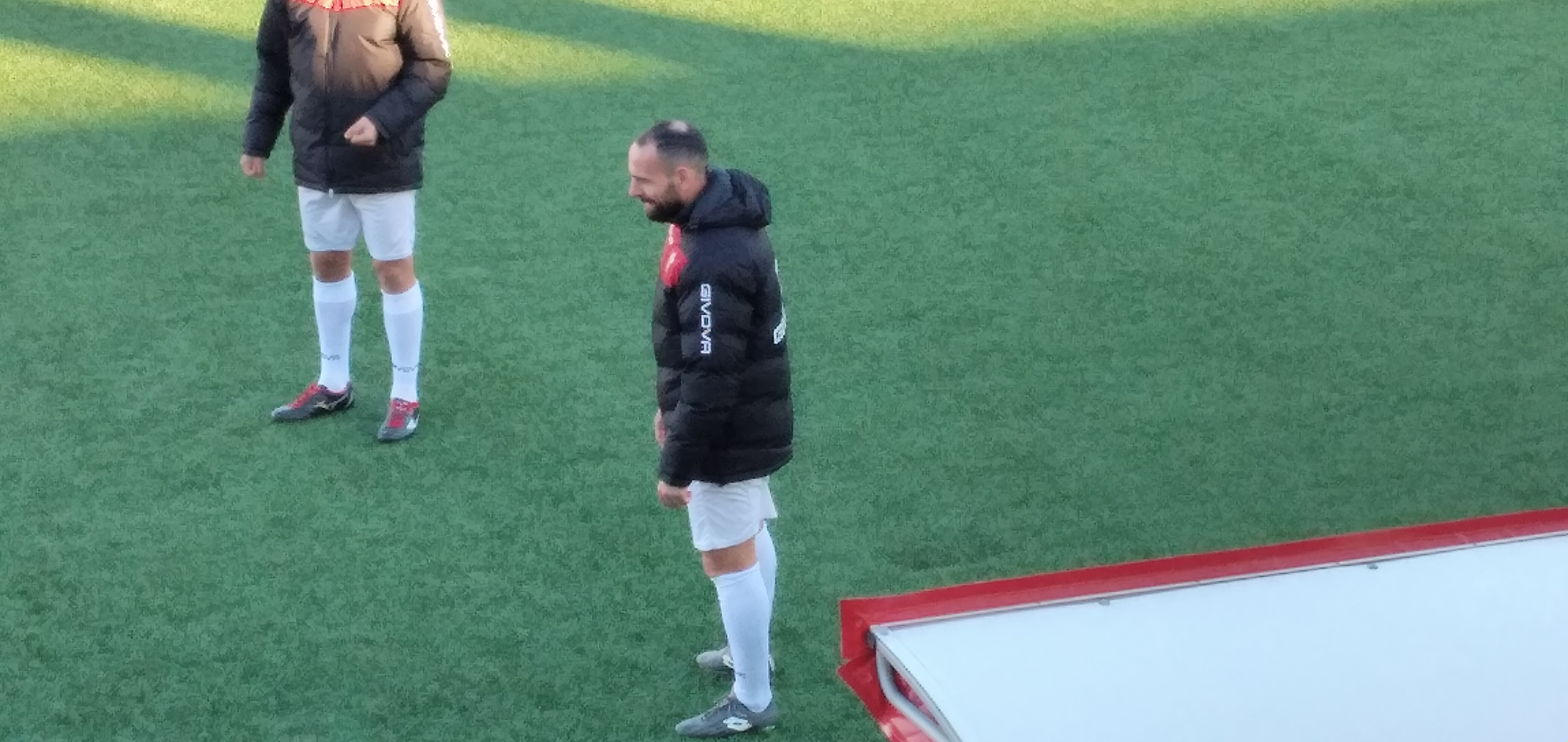

Personal information
- Date of birth: 29 September 1984 (age 42)
- Place of birth: Torre Annunziata, Italy
- Height: 1.78 m (5 ft 10 in)
- Position: Left back

Team information
- Current team: Nocerina
- Number: 26

Senior career*
Years	Team	Apps	(Gls)
2001–2002	Terzigno		
2002–2004	Salernitana	5	(0)
2004–2005	Nocerina	34	(1)
2005–2009	Grosseto	121	(6)
2009–2014	Siena	3	(0)
2010–2011	→ Torino (loan)	41	(1)
2011–2012	→ Bari (loan)	35	(2)
2012–2013	→ Spezia (loan)	35	(0)
2013–2014	→ Modena (loan)	36	(1)
2014–2016	Novara	47	(1)
2016–2019	Venezia	81	(3)
2019	Turris	3	(0)
2020	Gozzano	4	(0)
2020–	Nocerina	10	(0)
- * Club domestic league appearances and goals as of 23:07, 26 January 2021 (UTC)

Agostino Garofalo (born 29 September 1984) is an Italian footballer who plays as a defender for A.S.D. Nocerina 1910.

== Career ==
=== Siena ===
On 1 July 2009, Garofalo was signed by Siena for €530,000. on a five-year contract. However, he spent four seasons on loan to Serie B clubs, namely Torino, Bari, Spezia and Modena.

=== Novara ===
On 20 August 2014, Garofalo was signed by Lega Pro club Novara on a two-year contract. The club were promoted back to Serie B in 2015. He wore the number 29 shirt for the new season.

=== Venezia ===
In the summer of 2016 he was bought by Venezia.

=== Gozzano ===
On 29 January 2020, he joined Serie C club Gozzano.

=== Nocerina ===
After nearly nine months at Gozzano, Grofalo moved to A.S.D. Nocerina 1910 on 26 September 2020.

== Career statistics ==
As of 12 February 2018

Appearances and goals by club, season and competition
Club	Season	League			Cup		Other		Total	
Club	Season	Division	Apps	Goals	Apps	Goals	Apps	Goals	Apps	Goals
Grosseto	2008–09	Serie B	33	1	0	0	0	0	33	1
Robur Siena	2009–10	Serie A	3	0	0	0	0	0	3	0
Torino (loan)	2009–10	Serie B	12	1	1	0	0	0	13	1
Torino (loan)	2010–11	Serie B	29	0	1	0	0	0	30	0
Torino (loan)	Total		41	1	1	0	0	0	42	1
Bari 1908 (loan)	2011–12	Serie B	35	2	1	0	0	0	36	2
Spezia (loan)	2012–13	Serie B	35	0	2	0	0	0	37	0
Modena (loan)	2013–14	Serie B	36	1	1	0	0	0	37	1
Novara	2014–15	Lega Pro	26	1	0	0	0	0	26	1
Novara	2015–16	Serie B	21	0	2	0	0	0	23	0
Novara	Total		47	1	2	0	0	0	49	1
Venezia	2016–17	Lega Pro	34	2	0	0	0	0	34	2
Venezia	2017–18	Serie B	14	1	0	0	0	0	14	1
Venezia	Total		48	3	0	0	0	0	48	3
Career totals			278	9	8	0	0	0	286	9
