= Andrea Bagnai =

Italian footballer (born 1992)

Personal information
- Date of birth: 2 April 1992 (age 34)
- Place of birth: Florence, Italy
- Height: 1.86 m (6 ft 1 in)
- Position: Centre back

Team information
- Current team: Montevarchi
- Number: 6

Youth career
- –2011: Fiorentina

Senior career*
Years	Team	Apps	(Gls)
2011–2013	Carrarese	5	(0)
2013–2015	Prato	40	(1)
2015	Lumezzane	7	(0)
2015–2016	Fortis Juventus	16	(0)
2016–2018	Mezzolara	64	(5)
2018–2019	Bastia	32	(2)
2019	Legnago Salus	4	(0)
2019–	Montevarchi	7	(0)

International career
2008–2009	Italy U17	9	(0)
2009–2010	Italy U18	6	(0)
- * Club domestic league appearances and goals as of 22:12, 20 April 2020 (UTC)

Andrea Bagnai (born 2 April 1992) is an Italian footballer who plays for Italian side Serie D club Montevarchi.

== Biography ==
Born in Florence, Tuscany, Bagnai started his career at hometown club ACF Fiorentina. He was the member of U14 team in 2005–06 season and climbed to the reserve from 2009 to 2011. On 11 July 2011 Bagnai was farmed to Tuscan side Carrarese in co-ownership deal for a peppercorn of €500. Bagnai made his debut in 2011–12 Coppa Italia and played twice, both substitute. However, he did not play any game in 2011–12 Lega Pro Prima Divisione, and had a medical operation in January 2012. In June 2012 the co-ownership was terminated in favour of Carrarese. Fiorentina gave up all her youth product except Marco Romizi.

In January 2013 Bagnai was sold to Prato in a new co-ownership deal; in June 2013 Carrarese gave up its 50% registration rights.

=== International career ===
Bagnai received his first call-up in February 2007, from Italy national under-16 football team against U17 team of his own club (Allievi team) That national team consist of mainly born 1991 player. In May 2007 he was included in a summer training camp dedicated to next season U16 and U15 (born 1992–93) However Bagnai did not receive any U16 call-up that season (2007–08). In September 2008, Bagnai received a call-up to a U17 tournament in Saarland. He also played all 3 matches in 2009 UEFA European Under-17 Football Championship qualification. However, he only played once in elite qualification despite wearing no.2 shirt. He substituted Felice Natalino in the 10th minute of the first half. In 2009 FIFA U-17 World Cup, Bagnai also played once, as starting defender in the last round of the group stage. Italy certainly qualified to the next round before that match. After the tournament Bagnai also played for Italy U18 in a friendly match in Slovakia in April 2010. However Bagnai did not play any game for U19 team in 2010–11 season despite received one call-up against Romania.
