= Stefano Olivieri =

Italian footballer

Personal information
- Date of birth: 22 June 1983 (age 43)
- Place of birth: Giulianova, Italy
- Height: 1.83 m (6 ft 0 in)
- Position: Defender

Youth career
- 1999–2002: Giulianova

Senior career*
Years	Team	Apps	(Gls)
1999–2006	Giulianova	52	(2)
2006–2007	Pescara	22	(2)
2007–2010	Chievo	0	(0)
2007–2009	→ Ancona (loan)	43	(2)
- * Club domestic league appearances and goals as of 12:17, 7 January 2010 (UTC)

Stefano Olivieri (born 22 June 1983) is a former Italian footballer.

== Career ==
Olivieri started his career at hometown club Giulianova. He played 52 matches at Serie C1 before signed by Chievo in July 2006. He was farmed to Pescara (in co-ownership deal) of Serie B, then Ancona of Serie C1 in 2007–08 season. He won the runner-up and promotion playoffs in Group B with club, and secured another year on loan, with Andrea De Falco, which Olivieri already met him at Pescara.

In 2009–10 season, he failed to loan out, and he was not offered any shirt number.
