= Roberto Maurantonio =

Italian footballer

Personal information
- Date of birth: 7 June 1981 (age 45)
- Place of birth: Bari, Italy
- Height: 1.82 m (6 ft 0 in)
- Position: Goalkeeper

Youth career
- –1999: Bari

Senior career*
Years	Team	Apps	(Gls)
1999–2000	Locorotondo	33	(0)
2000–2002	Martina	62	(0)
2002–2003	Ascoli	3	(0)
2003–2004	Martina	1	(0)
2004	→ Ascoli (loan)	5	(0)
2004–2005	Ascoli	13	(0)
2005–2007	Lanciano	47	(0)
2007–2011	Piacenza	9	(0)
2011	→ Ascoli (loan)	2	(0)
2011–2013	Ascoli	21	(0)
2013–2014	Grosseto	3	(0)
2014–2015	Carpi	1	(0)
2015–2016	Akragas	17	(0)
2016–2017	Taranto	30	(0)
2017–2018	Fidelis Andria	29	(0)
2018–2019	Bari	0	(0)
- * Club domestic league appearances and goals

Roberto Maurantonio (born 7 June 1981) is an Italian former football goalkeeper.

== Career ==
Maurantonio started his career in 1999 with Locorotondo of the Province of Bari before going on to play for Martina, Ascoli, Lanciano, Piacenza and Grosseto across levels 5 to 2 of Italian football, playing 44 times for Ascoli, across five spells at the club. In October 2014, Maurantonio joined Carpi in Serie B until the end of the season.
