= Daniele Dalla Bona =

Italian professional footballer (born 1983)

Personal information
- Full name: Daniele Dalla Bona
- Date of birth: 12 August 1983 (age 43)
- Place of birth: Varese, Italy
- Height: 1.83 m (6 ft 0 in)
- Position: Midfielder

Senior career*
Years	Team	Apps	(Gls)
2001–2002	Varese	8	(0)
2002–2003	Biellese	29	(3)
2003–2004	Varese	11	(0)
2004–2006	Vercelli	38	(0)
2006	→ Casale (loan)	8	(0)
2006–2007	Massese	30	(2)
2007–2009	Pro Patria	55	(3)
2009–2011	Cittadella	70	(5)
2011–2014	Modena	63	(3)
2014–2015	Real Vicenza	35	(3)
2015–2017	Mantova	18	(0)
2016	→ AlbinoLeffe (loan)	15	(0)
2016–2017	→ Santarcangelo (loan)	22	(2)
2017–2018	Santarcangelo	33	(2)
2018–2019	Giana Erminio	31	(2)
2019	Fidelis Andria	11	(1)
2019–2021	Giana Erminio	30	(2)
- * Club domestic league appearances and goals as of 2 May 2021

Daniele Dalla Bona (born 12 August 1983) is an Italian professional footballer who plays mainly as a midfielder.

== Club career ==
On 27 December 2019 he returned to Giana Erminio, signing a contract until the end of the 2019–20 season.
