= Francesco Bossa =

Italian footballer

Personal information
- Full name: Francesco Bossa
- Date of birth: 26 May 1990 (age 36)
- Place of birth: Naples, Italy
- Position: Midfielder

Team information
- Current team: Sammaurese

Youth career
- Messina
- 2007–2008: Bellinzona
- 2008–2010: Udinese

Senior career*
| Years | Team | Apps | (Gls) |
| 2010–2013 | Udinese | 0 | (0) |
| 2010–2011 | → Como (loan) | 12 | (0) |
| 2011–2012 | → Grosseto (loan) | 1 | (0) |
| 2012–2013 | → Tritium (loan) | 20 | (0) |
| 2013–2014 | Borgomanero | 7 | (0) |
| 2014 | Trissino-Valdagno | 10 | (0) |
| 2014–2015 | Nuorese | 24 | (2) |
| 2015–2018 | Fermana | 49 | (1) |
| 2018– | Sammaurese | 7 | (0) |
- * Club domestic league appearances and goals as of 1 June 2018

Francesco Bossa (born 26 May 1990) is an Italian footballer who plays as a midfielder.

== Career ==
Born in Naples, Campania, Bossa started his career at Sicilian club Messina. On 17 January 2007 he breached his youth contract to join Swiss club Bellinzona, located in the Italian speaking canton. On 31 January 2008 Bossa and teammate Alessandro Gherardi and Carlo De Micco were returned to Italy for Udinese, AlbinoLeffe and Triestina respectively. Bossa was a player for the reserve until 2010. He also suspended for one month due to his contract dispute with Messina.

In July 2010 Bossa and Rosario Licata were left for Como. In July 2011 he was loaned to U.S. Grosseto F.C., along with Giovanni Formiconi and Federico Gerardi. Bossa wore no.16 shirt for the first team.
