= Cristian Galano =

Italian footballer (born 1991)

Personal information
- Date of birth: 1 April 1991 (age 35)
- Place of birth: Foggia, Italy
- Height: 1.70 m (5 ft 7 in)
- Positions: Forward; winger

Team information
- Current team: Nola
- Number: 11

Youth career
- –2010: Bari

Senior career*
| Years | Team | Apps | (Gls) |
| 2009–2016 | Bari | 123 | (22) |
| 2010–2011 | → Gubbio (loan) | 30 | (5) |
| 2015–2016 | → Vicenza (loan) | 37 | (7) |
| 2016–2017 | Vicenza | 17 | (1) |
| 2017 | → Bari (loan) | 19 | (7) |
| 2017–2018 | Bari | 32 | (14) |
| 2018–2019 | Parma | 0 | (0) |
| 2018–2019 | → Foggia (loan) | 21 | (3) |
| 2019–2022 | Pescara | 70 | (17) |
| 2022 | → Bari (loan) | 9 | (0) |
| 2022–2023 | Bari | 4 | (0) |
| 2023–2024 | Brindisi | 8 | (0) |
| 2024–2025 | Polimnia | | |
| 2025–2026 | Real Normanna | 11 | (1) |
| 2026– | Nola | 7 | (1) |

International career
| 2006 | Italy U-16 | 2 | (0) |
| 2009 | Italy U-18 | 5 | (2) |
| 2008–2010 | Italy U-19 | 15 | (1) |
| 2010 | Italy U-20 | 2 | (0) |
- * Club domestic league appearances and goals as of 15 March 2026

Cristian Galano (born 1 April 1991) is an Italian footballer who plays as a forward or midfielder for Serie D club Nola.

He is known for being the first footballer to receive a "green card" for fair play.

== Club career ==
=== Bari ===
Born in Foggia, Apulia, Galano started his career at Serie B and Apulian team Bari. He made his Serie B debut on 23 May 2009 (2nd last round), losing to Salernitana 2–3. He wore no.15 shirt that season. In 2010, he graduated from the under-20 youth team, and loaned to Gubbio, to replace the left of Alessandro Marotta who returned to Bari. He was the third team top-scorer along with Alfredo Donnarumma (both 5), behind Juanito (18) and Martino Borghese (6).

He returned to Bari on 1 July 2011 and signed a new 3-year contract. Galano later extended his contract to 30 June 2016.

=== Vicenza ===
On 31 August 2015 Galano was signed by Vicenza in a temporary deal, with an obligation to sign him outright.

He was assigned number 19 shirt for 2015–16 Serie B, which was vacated by Andrea Cocco. He changed to wear number 11 shirt in the first half of 2016–17 Serie B, which was vacated by Giovanni Sbrissa. Galano left his club again on 31 January 2017, ending 1 1/2 years in the Veneto region. In October 2016, he received the first ever green card, an initiative introduced in the Serie B to reward fair play, when he indicated to the referee that a goal-kick should have been awarded instead of a corner.

=== Bari return ===
On 31 January 2017 Galano re-joined Bari in a temporary deal, also with an obligation to sign him outright. On the same day Vicenza teammate Filip Raičević also joined Bari.

=== Parma ===
On 3 August 2018, Galano signed with Serie A team Parma a 3-years contract.

==== Foggia (loan) ====
On 17 August 2018, Galano joined Serie B side Foggia on loan with an option to buy.

=== Pescara ===
On 29 June 2019, Galano signed to Pescara.

==== Second Bari return ====
On 31 January 2022, Galano returned to Bari on loan with a conditional obligation to buy.

== International career ==
=== Italy U-16 ===
Galano started his international career at the Val-de-Marne under-16 international tournament. He was never capped for the Azzurrini at under-17 level.

=== Italy U-19 ===
He was promoted to the U-19 team in December 2008, as the born in 1990 class failed to enter 2009 UEFA European Under-19 Football Championship elite qualification, thus the U-18 team that season would also consist of players that were only eligible for the 2010 edition. He scored on his debut, a 3–1 win over Romania. He also capped for the U-18 team against Denmark U-18, which was his U-18 debut. Since then he played most of the fixtures of the U-18/19 team (born in 1991 class), appearing in a win over Norway U-19 in March, and in a 2–2 draw with Ukraine U-19 (born in 1990 class) in April He played all 4 matches in the U-18 Slovakia International Cup, scored 2 goals. During the 2009–10 season, he was a regular member of the team: he played in the friendly matches against Denmark U-19 and the Netherlands U-19, 2 out of 3 qualifying matches, winning 3–0 against Turkey U-19, and drawing 1–1 with Germany, and also featuring in a 1–0 friendly win over Switzerland U-19. He played all 3 games in the elite round, replacing Marco D'Alessandro in the second half of the first match, and playing in the rest as a starter. He was selected to the final round, and played twice, on both occasions replacing Jacopo Sala at half time. The team failed to score any goal and finished in last place of Group B (tied for seventh place).

=== Italy U-20 ===
During the 2010–11 season he played twice in the Four Nations Tournament. He received a call-up from Ciro Ferrara in January 2011 for an under-21 training camp and an unofficial friendly against Bellinzona.

== Career statistics ==
As of match played 5 March 2022

Appearances and goals by club, season and competition
| Club | Season | League | | | Cup | | Other | | Total | |
| Club | Season | Division | Apps | Goals | Apps | Goals | Apps | Goals | Apps | Goals |
|---|---|---|---|---|---|---|---|---|---|---|
| Bari | 2008–09 | Serie B | 1 | 0 | 0 | 0 | — | | 1 | 0 |
| Bari | 2011–12 | Serie B | 15 | 1 | 1 | 0 | — | | 16 | 1 |
| Bari | 2012–13 | Serie B | 29 | 4 | 1 | 0 | — | | 30 | 4 |
| Bari | 2013–14 | Serie B | 44 | 13 | 2 | 0 | — | | 46 | 13 |
| Bari | 2014–15 | Serie B | 34 | 4 | 2 | 1 | — | | 36 | 5 |
| Bari | Total | | 123 | 22 | 6 | 1 | 0 | 0 | 129 | 23 |
| Gubbio (loan) | 2010–11 | Lega Pro Prima Divisione | 30 | 5 | 2 | 0 | — | | 32 | 5 |
| Vicenza (loan) | 2015–16 | Serie B | 37 | 7 | 0 | 0 | — | | 37 | 7 |
| Vicenza | 2016–17 | Serie B | 17 | 1 | 2 | 1 | — | | 19 | 2 |
| Bari (loan) | 2016–17 | Serie B | 19 | 7 | 0 | 0 | — | | 19 | 7 |
| Bari | 2017–18 | Serie B | 32 | 14 | 1 | 2 | 1 (Note: Appearance(s) in Relegation Playoffs) | 1 | 34 | 17 |
| Bari | Total | | 51 | 21 | 1 | 2 | 1 | 1 | 53 | 24 |
| Parma | 2018–19 | Serie A | 0 | 0 | 1 | 0 | — | | 1 | 0 |
| Foggia (loan) | 2018–19 | Serie B | 21 | 3 | 0 | 0 | — | | 21 | 3 |
| Pescara | 2019–20 | Serie B | 35 | 13 | 2 | 0 | 2 | 1 | 39 | 14 |
| Pescara | 2020–21 | Serie C | 27 | 4 | 2 | 0 | — | | 29 | 4 |
| Pescara | 2021–22 | Serie C | 8 | 0 | 0 | 0 | — | | 8 | 0 |
| Pescara | Total | | 70 | 17 | 4 | 0 | 2 | 1 | 76 | 18 |
| Bari (loan) | 2021–22 | Serie C | 5 | 0 | 0 | 0 | — | | 5 | 0 |
| Career totals | | | 354 | 76 | 16 | 4 | 3 | 2 | 373 | 82 |

== Honours ==
=== Club ===
Bari

- Serie B: 2008–09
- Serie C: 2021–22 (Group C)

Gubbio

- Lega Pro Prima Divisione: 2010–11

=== Record ===
Cristian Galano is recorded to be the first player to be shown a green card in the history of soccer. This was in an event that took place when he indicated to the referee that a goal-kick should have been awarded instead of a corner. A green card has only been used in Italian Serie B and other tournaments played by countries deemed 'outside' FIFA.
