= Manuel Iori =

Italian footballer

Personal information
- Date of birth: 12 March 1982 (age 44)
- Place of birth: Varese, Italy
- Height: 1.81 m (5 ft 11 in)
- Position: Midfielder

Team information
- Current team: Novara (manager)

Senior career*
Years	Team	Apps	(Gls)
1999–2000	Varese	2	(0)
2000–2001	Borgosesia	25	(4)
2001–2003	Legnano	56	(1)
2003–2004	Meda	31	(2)
2004–2006	Carpenedolo	59	(0)
2006–2009	Cittadella	106	(9)
2009–2012	Chievo	15	(0)
2010–2011	→ Livorno (loan)	39	(3)
2011–2012	→ Torino (loan)	37	(0)
2012	→ Cesena (loan)	16	(0)
2013–2014	Padova	44	(2)
2014–2015	Pisa	31	(3)
2015–2021	Cittadella	198	(36)

Managerial career
- 2023: Sangiuliano City
- 2024–2025: Casertana
- 2025: Casertana
- 2025–2026: Cittadella
- 2026–: Novara
- * Club domestic league appearances and goals

Manuel Iori (born 12 March 1982) is an Italian professional football coach and a former midfielder who is the manager of Serie C Group A club Novara.

== Playing career ==
=== Early career ===
Iori started his professional career at Varese of Serie C1. He then played for the Serie D side Borgosesia before playing five seasons in Serie C2.

=== Cittadella ===
In the summer of 2006, he joined Cittadella of Serie C1, where he won promotion playoffs in 2008. He played 41 out of 42 league matches in his first Serie B season and helped the newcomer finish just above the relegation line.

=== Chievo ===
In August 2009, he was signed by Chievo in a co-ownership bid. Antimo Iunco was sent to the club on loan later as part of the deal. After Luca Rigoni was injured, he played as the starting central midfielder until Rigoni recovered. He also played in the 2009–10 Coppa Italia against Frosinone, coming on as a substitute for Rigoni in the 54th minute on 25 November 2009, and in the match against ACF Fiorentina as a starter. The game ended in a 2–3 loss.

In June 2010 Chievo bought him outright, co-currently Iunco who went on loan to Cittadella in 2009–10 season, was signed by Cittadella in co-ownership deal, for €500,000.

On 17 August 2010, he was loaned to Serie B side Livorno on loan with an option to purchase.

== Coaching career ==
On 20 July 2021, Iori was officially unveiled as the new coach in charge of the Primavera under-19 youth team at Cittadella, his last team as a player.

On 19 June 2024, Iori was unveiled as the new head coach of Serie C club Casertana. He was dismissed on 9 January 2025, only to be appointed back in charge of the team two months later, on 13 March.

After completing the season with Casertana, Iori returned to Cittadella, this time as head coach, following the club's relegation to Serie C.

On 30 September 2026, Iori signed with Serie C club Novara until the end of the 2026–27 season.
