= Giovanni Formiconi =

Italian footballer (born 1989)

Personal information
- Date of birth: 14 December 1989 (age 36)
- Place of birth: Genoa, Italy
- Height: 1.86 m (6 ft 1 in)
- Position: Right back

Team information
- Current team: Notaresco

Youth career
- Cisco Roma

Senior career*
Years	Team	Apps	(Gls)
2007	Cisco Roma	8	(0)
2008–2011	Udinese	0	(0)
2009–2010	→ Lumezzane (loan)	22	(0)
2010–2011	→ Benevento (loan)	26	(0)
2011–2015	Grosseto	67	(1)
2015–2016	Cremonese	20	(0)
2016–2017	Bassano	33	(0)
2017–2018	Pordenone	34	(3)
2018–2020	Triestina	56	(1)
2020–2022	Gubbio	54	(1)
2022–2023	Taranto	28	(0)
2023–	Notaresco	3	(0)

International career
2008	Italy U-19	2	(0)
2008–2010	Italy U-20	2	(0)
- * Club domestic league appearances and goals as of 20 December 2023

Giovanni Formiconi (born 14 December 1989) is an Italian professional footballer who plays as a defender for Serie D club Notaresco.

== Club career ==
In January 2008 Formiconi joined Serie A team Udinese, at first on loan. Since mid-2009 he moved back to Lega Pro divisions on temporary basis, along with Daniel Bradaschia in 2009–10. In June 2010 Lumezzane excised the rights to sign both players but Udinese excised the counter-option on Formiconi. He then left for Benevento.

On 23 June 2011 Benevento announced that they did not excised the rights to sign Formiconi. On 8 July 2011 he left for Grosseto along with Federico Gerardi and Francesco Bossa.

On 22 July 2016, he was signed by Bassano.

On 18 August 2020 he signed with Gubbio.

== International career ==
Formiconi represented Italy at the 2008 UEFA European Under-19 Football Championship
