= Stefano Sabelli =

Italian footballer (born 1993)

Personal information
- Date of birth: 13 January 1993 (age 33)
- Place of birth: Rome, Italy
- Height: 1.76 m (5 ft 9 in)
- Positions: Full-back; midfielder

Team information
- Current team: Genoa
- Number: 20

Youth career
- –2012: Roma

Senior career*
Years	Team	Apps	(Gls)
2012–2018	Bari	180	(4)
2016	→ Carpi (loan)	7	(1)
2018–2021	Brescia	78	(0)
2021	Empoli	12	(0)
2021–	Genoa	119	(1)
2022	→ Brescia (loan)	16	(0)

International career^{‡}
2011	Italy U18	4	(0)
2011–2012	Italy U19	8	(0)
2012–2013	Italy U20	8	(0)
2013–2015	Italy U21	10	(0)
- * Club domestic league appearances and goals as of 25 May 2026 ‡ National team caps and goals as of 24 June 2015

Stefano Sabelli (born 13 January 1993) is an Italian professional footballer who plays as a full-back or midfielder for Serie A club Genoa.

== Career ==
Born in Rome, Sabelli started his career at A.S. Roma. In July 2012 Sabelli left for A.S. Bari in a temporary deal. He wore no.2 shirt for his new team. Sabelli made his debut in 2012–13 Coppa Italia. On 21 June 2013, Bari excised the option to buy him in a co-ownership deal for €300,000. In June 2014 Bari acquired him outright for an additional €600,000.

On 21 January 2016, he was signed by Serie A struggler Carpi, in a temporary deal.

On 29 June 2018, he joined Serie B club Brescia.

On 19 January 2021, Sabelli joined Serie B club Empoli.

On 19 July 2021, Sabelli signed with Serie A club Genoa on four-year contract. On 14 January 2022, he returned to Brescia on loan.

== Career statistics ==
=== Club ===
As of match played 25 May 2025

Appearances and goals by club, season and competition
Club	Season	League			National Cup (Note: Includes Coppa Italia)		Europe		Other		Total	
Club	Season	Division	Apps	Goals	Apps	Goals	Apps	Goals	Apps	Goals	Apps	Goals
Bari	2012–13	Serie B	29	0	1	0	—		—		30	0
Bari	2013–14	Serie B	37	0	1	0	—		3 (Note: Appearance(s) in Serie B play-off)	0	41	0
Bari	2014–15	Serie B	31	2	1	0	—		—		32	2
Bari	2015–16	Serie B	21	1	1	0	—		—		22	1
Bari	2016–17	Serie B	32	0	2	0	—		—		34	0
Bari	2017–18	Serie B	20	1	1	0	—		1	0	22	1
Bari	Total		170	4	7	0	—		4	0	181	4
Carpi (loan)	2015–16	Serie A	7	1	0	0	—		—		7	1
Brescia	2018–19	Serie B	29	0	1	0	—		—		30	0
Brescia	2019–20	Serie A	36	0	1	0	—		—		37	0
Brescia	2020–21	Serie B	13	0	1	0	—		—		14	0
Brescia	Total		78	0	3	0	—		—		81	0
Empoli	2020–21	Serie B	12	0	0	0	—		—		12	0
Genoa	2021–22	Serie A	7	0	2	0	—		—		9	0
Genoa	2022–23	Serie B	30	1	2	0	—		—		32	1
Genoa	2023–24	Serie A	32	0	1	0	—		—		33	0
Genoa	2024–25	Serie A	34	0	2	0	—		—		36	0
Genoa	Total		103	1	7	0	—		—		110	1
Brescia (loan)	2021–22	Serie B	16	0	0	0	—		2	0	18	0
Career total			386	6	17	0	—		6	0	409	6
