= Francesco Longo Mancini =

Italian painter (1880–1954)

Francesco Longo Mancini (1880–1954) was an Italian painter of the early 20th century who was known for his paintings of nudes. He was born in Catania where he lived part of his life. He died in Rome. He signed his paintings "F. Longo Mancini".

== Works ==
- The Unexpected Visitor
- Nudo di Donna
- La Ragazza di Rosa
- The Red Shoes
