= Diego Albadoro =

Italian footballer (born 1989)

Personal information
- Date of birth: 26 February 1989 (age 37)
- Place of birth: Naples, Italy
- Height: 1.85 m (6 ft 1 in)
- Position: Striker

Team information
- Current team: Scafatese
- Number: 89

Senior career*
Years	Team	Apps	(Gls)
2007–2008	Giugliano	29	(7)
2008–2014	Bari	14	(0)
2009–2010	→ Brindisi (loan)	21	(4)
2010–2011	→ Juve Stabia (loan)	27	(8)
2014–2016	Matera	31	(3)
2016–2017	Fondi	32	(12)
2017–2019	Ternana	17	(3)
2019–2020	Avellino	25	(5)
2020–2024	Picerno	61	(17)
2024–	Scafatese	0	(0)
- * Club domestic league appearances and goals as of 27 April 2024

Diego Albadoro (born 26 February 1989) is a professional Italian football player who plays for the Italian Serie D club Scafatese.

== Club career ==
On 5 August 2019, he signed with Avellino.

On 8 October 2020, he joined Serie D club Picerno. He helped Picerno achieve promotion to Serie C at the end of the 2020–21 season.
