= Diego Conson =

Italian footballer (born 1990)

Personal information
- Date of birth: 11 January 1990 (age 36)
- Place of birth: Naples, Italy
- Height: 1.88 m (6 ft 2 in)
- Position: Defender

Team information
- Current team: Chieti
- Number: 4

Senior career*
Years	Team	Apps	(Gls)
–2011	Pomezia		
2011–2014	Viareggio	58	(0)
2014–2015	Lupa Roma	30	(0)
2015–2016	Sambenedettese	27	(2)
2016–2017	Forlì	38	(1)
2017–2018	Sambenedettese	34	(0)
2018–2019	Reggina	33	(1)
2019–2020	Carrarese	12	(2)
2020–2021	Potenza	30	(0)
2021–2022	Siena	6	(0)
2022–2023	Sambenedettese	43	(0)
2023–	Chieti	15	(0)
- * Club domestic league appearances and goals as of 20 December 2023

Diego Conson (born 11 January 1990) is an Italian footballer who plays as a defender for Serie D Group F club Chieti.

== Career ==
=== Carrarese ===
In July 2019, Conson was sold to Carrarese.

=== Siena ===
On 14 July 2021, he signed a two-year contract with Siena.

=== Sambenedettese ===
On 19 January 2022, he returned to Sambenedettese (now in Serie D) for his third stint with the club.
