= Francesco Mancini (footballer, born 1990) =

Italian footballer

Personal information
- Full name: Francesco Mancini
- Date of birth: 21 June 1990 (age 36)
- Place of birth: Rome, Italy
- Height: 1.74 m (5 ft 9 in)
- Position: Striker

Youth career
- Lazio

Senior career*
Years	Team	Apps	(Gls)
2009–2011	Lazio	0	(0)
2009–2010	→ Varese (loan)	0	(0)
2010–2011	→ Lumezzane (loan)	18	(0)
2011–2012	Grosseto	20	(2)
2012–2013	Milazzo	7	(1)
- * Club domestic league appearances and goals as of 14 October 2012 (UTC)

Francesco Mancini (born 21 June 1990 in Rome, Italy) is an Italian footballer who currently plays as a midfielder for Milazzo.

Having come through the youth system of Lazio, Mancini was sent on loan to Varese in 2009 without having played a senior game for his parent club. However, he failed to make a senior appearance at Varese also and the following season was sent to Lumezzane.
