= Marino Defendi =

Italian footballer

Personal information
- Full name: Marino Giovanni Defendi
- Date of birth: 19 August 1985 (age 41)
- Place of birth: Bergamo, Italy
- Height: 1.74 m (5 ft 9 in)
- Position: Midfielder

Team information
- Current team: Narnese

Youth career
- 2002–2004: Atalanta

Senior career*
Years	Team	Apps	(Gls)
2004–2011	Atalanta	75	(5)
2007–2008	→ Chievo (loan)	4	(0)
2009–2010	→ Lecce (loan)	26	(3)
2011	→ Grosseto (loan)	18	(1)
2011–2016	Bari	163	(9)
2016–2023	Ternana	202	(11)
2023–	Narnese	0	(0)

International career^{‡}
2003–2004	Italy U19	6	(0)
2004–2005	Italy U20	7	(0)
2005–2006	Italy U21	10	(0)
- * Club domestic league appearances and goals as of 15 July 2023 ‡ National team caps and goals as of 23:49, 21 August 2008 (UTC)

Marino Giovanni Defendi (born 19 August 1985) is an Italian footballer who plays as a midfielder for Narnese. Despite starting his career as a second striker, Defendi also played as a winger, attacking midfielder and more recently as a central or defensive midfielder.

== Club career ==
Defendi joined Bari in a three-year contract on 25 July 2011, as part of Andrea Masiello's deal.

In August 2016, Defendi joined Serie B side Ternana in a three-year contract.

== International career ==
Defender played for the Italy U20 side in the 2005 FIFA World Youth Championship, and for the Italy U21 side in the 2006 UEFA European Under-21 Football Championship.

== Honours ==
Atalanta

- Serie B: 2005–06
