= Gaël Genevier =

French footballer (born 1982)

Personal information
- Date of birth: 26 June 1982 (age 44)
- Place of birth: Saint-Martin-d'Hères, France
- Height: 1.74 m (5 ft 9 in)
- Position: Midfielder

Youth career
- –2002: Lyon

Senior career*
Years	Team	Apps	(Gls)
2002–2003	Lyon	0	(0)
2003–2004	Perugia	4	(0)
2004	→ Catania (loan)	8	(0)
2005–2006	Acireale	45	(2)
2006–2007	Sangiovannese	25	(1)
2007–2009	Pisa	68	(8)
2009–2014	Siena	5	(0)
2010	→ Torino (loan)	17	(1)
2011	→ Livorno (loan)	17	(0)
2012	→ Pisa (loan)	9	(0)
2012–2013	→ Juve Stabia (loan)	19	(2)
2013	→ Pro Vercelli (loan)	16	(0)
2013–2014	→ Novara (loan)	15	(0)
2014–2017	Lumezzane	62	(0)
2017–2018	Reggiana	47	(0)
2018–2019	Messina	18	(5)
2019–2024	AlbinoLeffe	100	(2)
- * Club domestic league appearances and goals

Gaël Genevier (born 26 June 1982) is a French former professional footballer who played as a midfielder.

== Career ==
Genevier moved to Italy in 2003, joining Perugia of Serie A and making four appearances in the Italian top flight before being loaned to Serie B side Catania in January 2004, being rarely featured in the regular lineup and playing only eight times with the etnei. In December 2004 he was consequently released by Perugia and signed by Serie C1 team Acireale, where he finally managed to play regularly. After two seasons with the Sicilian side, he moved to Tuscany to join Sangiovannese, another Serie C1 team, with some success. He was consequently noted by newly promoted Serie B club Pisa, who signed him for the 2007–2008 season.

=== Siena ===
On 1 July 2009, Genevier joined A.C. Siena for €400,000 on a five-year contract. On 29 January 2010, Siena loaned the French defensive midfielder to Serie B club Torino until June. He returned to Siena for 2010–11 Serie B, also due to his injury. After recovery, Genevier played for the reserve of Siena as well as for the first team in friendly match. Genevier only played once competitively, the last round of the league.

In 2011–12 Lega Pro Prima Divisione, Genevier returned to Pisa, now as "AC Pisa 1909 Società sportiva a responsabilità limitata". In 2012–13 Serie B, he was the player of Juve Stabia and Pro Vercelli. On 2 September 2014, Genevier was signed by Novara Calcio.

=== Lumezzane ===
On 13 August 2014, Genevier was signed by Lumezzane.

=== AlbinoLeffe ===
On 28 January 2019, he signed with AlbinoLeffe.

He announced his retirement at the end of the 2023–24 Serie C season.

== Honours ==
Perugia

- UEFA Intertoto Cup: 2003
