= Fabinho (footballer, born 1991) =

Brazilian footballer

Personal information
- Full name: Fabio Ayres
- Date of birth: 1 January 1991 (age 35)
- Place of birth: Guarulhos, Brazil
- Height: 1.78 m (5 ft 10 in)
- Position: Forward

Team information
- Current team: Bangu

Youth career
- Portuguesa
- Grêmio
- Internacional
- 2008–2011: Udinese

Senior career*
Years	Team	Apps	(Gls)
2010–2014	Udinese	0	(0)
2010–2011	→ Salernitana (loan)	19	(7)
2011–2012	→ Modena (loan)	14	(1)
2012–2014	→ Perugia (loan)	59	(10)
2014–2016	Perugia	39	(4)
2016–2017	Vicenza	8	(0)
2017–2018	Paganese	0	(0)
2019	Juventus SP	4	(1)
2020	Nova Iguaçu	13	(2)
2020–2021	Brusque	12	(0)
2020	→ XV de Piracicaba (loan)	0	(0)
2021	→ Hercílio Luz (loan)	7	(0)
2022	Artsul	11	(2)
2022	Bangu	0	(0)
2022	→ Duque de Caxias (loan)		
2023	Tupi		
2023	Campinense	2	(0)
- * Club domestic league appearances and goals as of 16:04, 14 March 2024 (UTC)

Fabio Ayres (born 1 January 1991), known as Fabinho, is a Brazilian footballer who plays as a forward.

== Career ==
=== Salernitana ===
Fabinho made his league debut for Salernitana against Südtirol on 16 January 2011. He scored his first goals for the club, a brace against SPAL on 27 February 2011, scoring in the 61st and 73rd minute.

=== Modena ===
Fabinho made his league debut for Modena against Reggina on 27 August 2011. Fabinho scored on his first goal for the club against Sassuolo on 1 November 2011, scoring in the 90th minute.

=== Loan to Perugia ===
Fabinho made his league debut for Perugia against Benevento on 3 September 2012. He scored his first goal for the club against ASD Nocerina 1910 on 17 February 2013, scoring in the 6th minute.

=== Perugia ===
During his second spell at the club, Fabinho made his league debut for Perugia against Bologna on 29 August 2014. He scored his first goal for the club against Livorno on 25 April 2015, scoring in the 82nd minute.

=== Vicenza ===
Fabinho made his league debut for Vicenza against Carpi on 27 August 2016.

=== Juventus SP ===
Fabinho made his league debut for Juventus SP against XV de Piracicaba on 18 March 2019. He scored his first goal for the club against Nacional SP on 30 March 2019, scoring in the 14th minute.

=== Nova Iguaçu ===
Fabinho scored on his league debut for Nova Iguaçu against Friburguense on 22 December 2019, scoring in the 57th minute.

=== Brusque ===
Fabinho made his league debut for Brusque against Joinville on 9 July 2020.

=== XV de Piracicaba ===
Fabinho made his debut for XV de Piracicaba in the Copa Paulista against Primavera SP on 4 November 2020. He scored his first goal for the club in the Copa Paulista, scoring against Osasco Audax on 22 November 2020, scoring in the 61st minute.

=== Hercílio Luz ===
Fabinho made his league debut for Hercílio Luz against Próspera Criciuma on 28 February 2021.

=== Campinense ===
Fabinho made his league debut for Campinense against Sousa on 4 July 2023.
