= Wilfred Osuji =

Nigerian footballer

Personal information
- Full name: Wilfred Chinoye Osuji
- Date of birth: 5 August 1990 (age 36)
- Place of birth: Lagos, Nigeria
- Height: 1.65 m (5 ft 5 in)
- Position: Midfielder

Team information
- Current team: Sanremese
- Number: 21

Senior career*
Years	Team	Apps	(Gls)
2008–2010	Milan	0	(0)
2009–2010	→ Varese (loan)	22	(1)
2010–2011	Varese	29	(0)
2011–2014	Padova	45	(1)
2012–2013	→ Modena (loan)	32	(0)
2014–2017	Modena	29	(0)
2015	→ Varese (loan)	11	(0)
2017–2018	Varesina	29	(5)
2018–2019	Reggiana	27	(2)
2019–2020	Savoia	26	(3)
2020–2023	Trento	59	(1)
2023–2024	Cjarlins Muzane	16	(1)
2024–2025	Cittadella Vis Modena	24	(2)
2025–	Sanremese	20	(2)
- * Club domestic league appearances and goals as of 25 June 2026

Wilfred Chinoye Osuji (born 5 August 1990) is a Nigerian professional footballer who plays midfielder for Italian Serie D club Sanremese.

== Club career ==
A product of Milan's youth system, Osuji was loaned out to Varese for the 2009–10 season. He made his official debut for the club on 23 August, in a match against Perugia. On 22 November, he also scored his first goal, in a home game against Foligno. On 7 July 2010, Varese announced to have signed the Nigerian on a co-ownership deal, for €10,000.

In the summer of 2011, Padova bought Varese's half for €310,000.
