= Marco Romizi =

Italian footballer (born 1990)

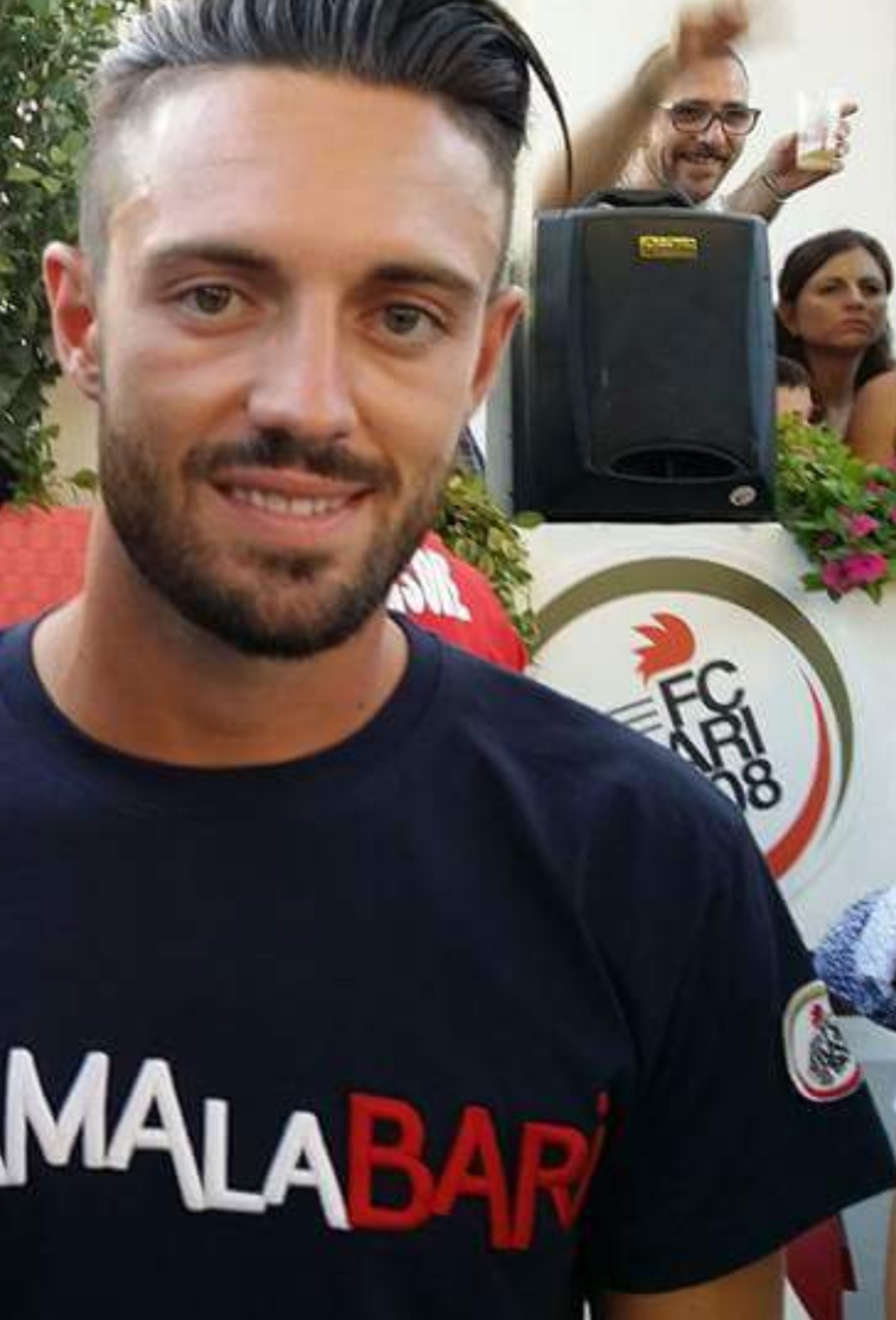

Personal information
- Full name: Marco Augusto Romizi
- Date of birth: 13 February 1990 (age 36)
- Place of birth: Arezzo, Italy
- Height: 1.75 m (5 ft 9 in)
- Position: Midfielder

Team information
- Current team: Fermana
- Number: 5

Youth career
- 2007–2009: Fiorentina

Senior career*
| Years | Team | Apps | (Gls) |
| 2009–2011 | Reggiana | 42 | (1) |
| 2011–2012 | Fiorentina | 0 | (0) |
| 2012–2017 | Bari | 157 | (4) |
| 2017–2018 | Vicenza | 31 | (1) |
| 2018–2020 | AlbinoLeffe | 32 | (1) |
| 2020 | Picerno | 6 | (0) |
| 2020–2021 | Bisceglie | 22 | (0) |
| 2021–2022 | Cavese | 31 | (1) |
| 2022–2023 | Trapani | 15 | (0) |
| 2023–2024 | Luparense | 14 | (0) |
| 2024 | Senigallia | 15 | (0) |
| 2024– | Fermana | 10 | (0) |

International career
| 2006–2007 | Italy U-17 | 10 | (0) |
| 2009–2010 | Italy U-20 | 7 | (0) |
| 2010–2011 | Italy U-21 | 5 | (0) |
- * Club domestic league appearances and goals as of 17 November 2024

Marco Augusto Romizi (born 13 February 1990) is an Italian footballer who plays as a midfielder for Serie D club Fermana.

== Club career ==
=== Fiorentina ===
He is a product of Fiorentina youth teams. In July 2009, he was sold to Reggiana of Lega Pro Prima Divisione in co-ownership.

In June 2010, he was bought back by la viola.

=== Bari ===
On 13 January 2012 he was transferred to Bari on co-ownership terms.

=== Serie C ===
On 28 January 2020, he signed with Serie C club Picerno.

On 29 December 2020 he joined Bisceglie.

=== Serie D ===
On 15 September 2021, he moved to Cavese in Serie D.

== International career ==
He represented Italy at the 2009 FIFA U-20 World Cup. On 17 November 2010 he made his debut with the Italy U-21 team in friendly match against Turkey.
