= Horacio Erpen =

Argentine footballer (born 1981)

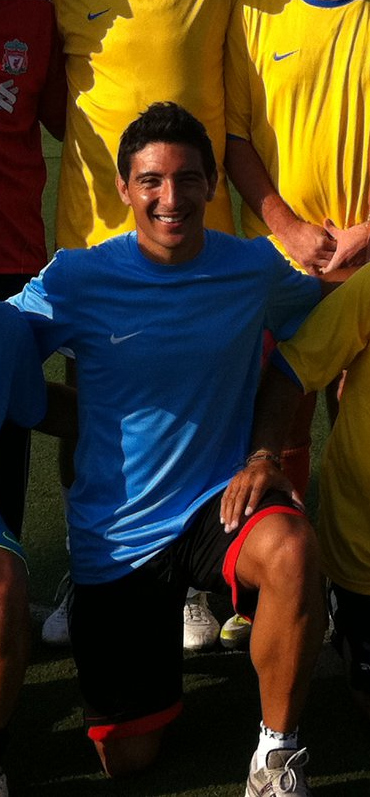

Personal information
- Full name: Horacio Nicolás Erpen Bariffo
- Date of birth: 29 August 1981 (age 45)
- Place of birth: Concepción del Uruguay, Argentina
- Height: 1.72 m (5 ft 8 in)
- Position: Winger

Youth career
- 1997: Juventud Unida
- 1998: Boca Juniors
- 1999–2000: Nacional

Senior career*
Years	Team	Apps	(Gls)
2001–2004	Tacuarembó	92	(14)
2004–2005	→ Venezia (loan)	23	(2)
2005	Chioggia	22	(14)
2006	Triestina	14	(0)
2006–2009	Sassuolo	91	(12)
2009–2010	Arezzo	30	(5)
2010–2011	Sorrento	26	(5)
2011–2013	Juve Stabia	44	(4)
2013–2014	Pro Vercelli	36	(5)
2014–2015	Arezzo	30	(7)
2015–2016	Carrarese	31	(7)
2016–2017	Arezzo	23	(4)
2017–2018	Crema 1908	22	(5)
2021–2023	Forza e Coraggio	49	(16)
- * Club domestic league appearances and goals as of 2 July 2017 (UTC)

Horacio Nicolás Erpen Bariffo (born 29 August 1981, in Concepción del Uruguay) is an Argentine former football player who played in the role of winger. Although he is originally from the Entre Ríos Province, he holds both Argentine and Italian citizenship.

== Career ==
On 15 July 2010 he joined Sorrento on a free transfer. On 11 July 2011 Erpen reached a mutual agreement with Sorrento, his club at the time, to terminate his contract. After his experience with Juve Stabia, on 7 January 2013 he moved to Pro Vercelli.

== Style of play ==
Erpen is a left-footed player who can occupy various roles in both attacking and midfield positions. Primarily playing as a right winger, he has also been utilized as an attacking midfielder and central striker. He is recognized for his proficiency in set-pieces and for providing assists to teammates.
