= Andrea De Falco =

Italian footballer (born 1986)

Personal information
- Date of birth: 19 June 1986 (age 40)
- Place of birth: Ancona, Italy
- Height: 1.79 m (5 ft 10 in)
- Position: Midfielder

Team information
- Current team: Tre Fiori
- Number: 11

Youth career
- Ancona

Senior career*
Years	Team	Apps	(Gls)
2004	Ancona	7	(0)
2004–2006	Fiorentina	0	(0)
2005	→ Pisa (loan)	9	(0)
2006–2007	Pescara	25	(2)
2007–2008	Taranto	25	(0)
2008–2011	Chievo	0	(0)
2008–2010	→ Ancona (loan)	73	(5)
2010–2011	→ Sassuolo (loan)	35	(5)
2011–2014	Bari	65	(6)
2014	→ Juve Stabia (loan)	13	(0)
2014–2018	Benevento	52	(2)
2017–2018	→ Matera (loan)	28	(1)
2018–2019	LR Vicenza	16	(0)
2019	Reggina	16	(0)
2019–2021	Viterbese	24	(0)
2021	Siena	11	(0)
2021–2022	Nereto	10	(1)
2022–	Tre Fiori	37	(5)

International career
2004	Italy U18	4	(0)
2004–2005	Italy U19	10	(1)
- * Club domestic league appearances and goals as of 25 June 2023

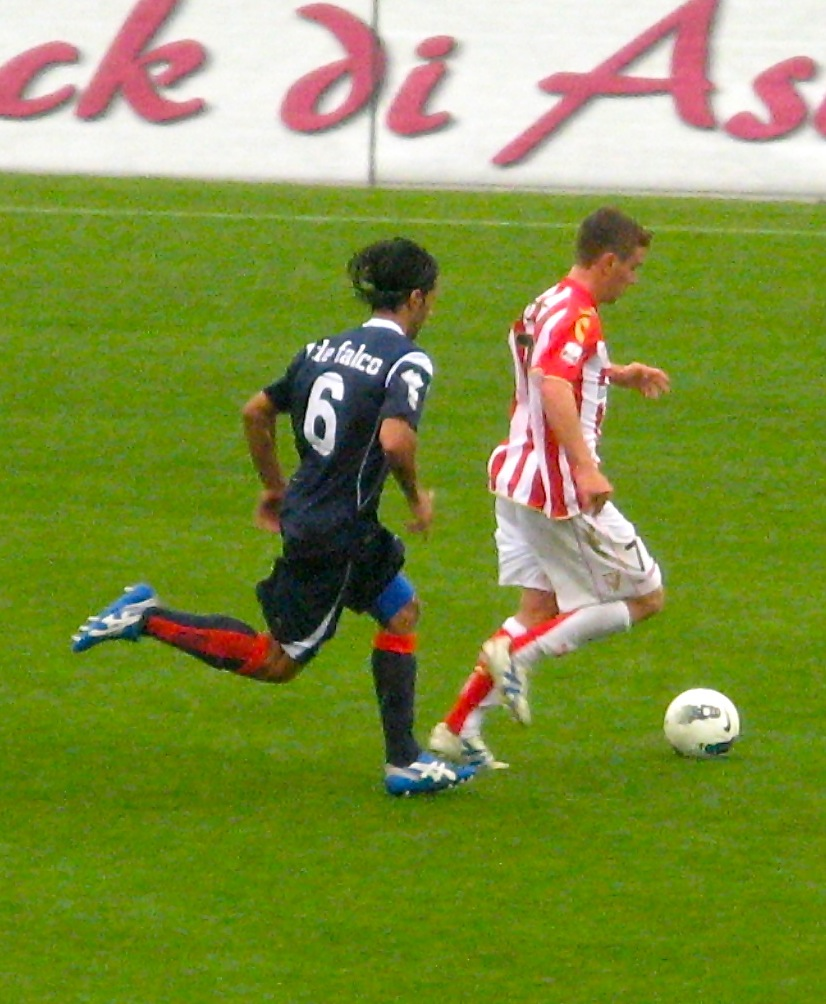
Andrea De Falco, playing football for Tre Fiori

Andrea De Falco (born 19 June 1986) is an Italian footballer. He plays for Tre Fiori.

== Career ==
=== Early career ===
He started his career at native club A.C. Ancona. He was awarded number 37 shirt of the first team on 24 January 2004. After making 7 Serie A appearances for the team in the second half of 2003–04 Serie A, he was signed by newly-promoted Serie A team Fiorentina on a free transfer, which Ancona faced bankruptcy and condemnation to Serie C2.

After playing a half season for the Primavera team, he was loaned to Pisa of Serie C1 in the second half of 2004–05 season. De Falco returned to Primavera team on 1 July and finished as runners-up of Campionato Nazionale Primavera losing to Juventus 0–2.

=== Pescara ===
De Falco was sold to Pescara (Serie B) in a co-ownership deal on 20 June 2006 for a peppercorn of five hundred euro, joining Antonio Aquilanti. In June 2007, Pescara bought De Falco outright by winning the auction between the club, for another five hundred euros.

=== Chievo ===
De Falco was signed by Chievo in August 2007, for free. However, he was immediately farmed to Taranto in another co-ownership deal, for a peppercorn of five hundred euro. In June 2008 Chievo bought back De Falco for an undisclosed fee.

He returned to Ancona for the 2008/09 season, on loan along with Stefano Olivieri from Chievo.

De Falco then spent 3 more seasons on loan, for Ancona again in 2009–10, Sassuolo in 2010–11 and Bari in 2011–12. De Falco also played once for Chievo in 2011–12 Coppa Italia. Bari did not excised the option to sign De Falco in June 2012. However, the club did in August.

=== Bari ===
On 27 August 2012 De Falco was exchanged with Nicola Bellomo, plus €350,000 cash to Bari. Both club retained 50% registration rights of their players. De Falco signed a three-year contract. The co-ownership deals were renewed in June 2013. In January 2014 De Falco was signed by S.S. Juve Stabia in a temporary deal. In March 2014 the liquidator of Bari valued the 50% registration rights of De Falco was €161,540.4, instead of the purchase price in 2012 (€1.4 million) nor any partial amortized value. In June 2014 Bari signed De Falco outright, for another €400,000, with Idriz Toskić moved to Chievo also for another €400,000.

=== Benevento ===
On 16 July 2014 De Falco was signed by Benevento in a two-year contract on a free transfer.

=== Reggina ===
On 15 January 2019, he signed a 1.5-year contract with Reggina.

=== Viterbese ===
On 1 August 2019, he joined Viterbese. On 22 February 2021, his contract was terminated by mutual consent.

=== Serie D ===
On 25 February 2021, he joined Siena in Serie D. On 27 September 2021 he signed with Nereto, also in Serie D.

== Match-fixing-scandal ==
De Falco was involved in the 2011–12 Italian football match-fixing scandal.
