= Claiton (footballer, born 1984) =

Brazilian-Italian footballer

Personal information
- Full name: Claiton Machado dos Santos
- Date of birth: 7 September 1984 (age 42)
- Place of birth: Santa Helena de Goiás, Brazil
- Height: 1.86 m (6 ft 1 in)
- Position: Centre back

Youth career
- Campo Grande
- Bologna

Senior career*
Years	Team	Apps	(Gls)
2001–2002	Bologna	1	(0)
2002–2006	Milan	0	(0)
2004–2005	→ Prato (loan)	1	(0)
2005–2006	→ Lecco (loan)	7	(0)
2006–2011	Varese	131	(8)
2011–2013	Bari	64	(6)
2013–2014	Chievo	8	(0)
2014–2017	Crotone	84	(3)
2017–2020	Cremonese	75	(7)
2020–2022	Catania	37	(2)
- * Club domestic league appearances and goals as of 2 May 2022

Claiton Machado dos Santos (born 7 September 1984) is a Brazilian former footballer who played as a defender.

== Career ==
=== Bologna, Milan and loans ===
Claiton started his professional football career at Bologna and played once in Serie A, on 17 June 2001. Bologna lost to Internazionale 1−2. In January 2002, he was signed by A.C. Milan and played for their Primavera team. On 18 December 2002, he made his debut for the club, coming in as a substitute for Alessandro Costacurta in the Coppa Italia 1/8 finals against Ancona. He was also featured as an unused bench for Milan in Serie A on 24 May 2003, the game right before the 2003 UEFA Champions League Final and 2003 Coppa Italia Final, in which Carlo Ancelotti used 4 youth team players in the starting lineup and another 7 players on the bench. In 2003-04 season, he remain the member of U20 youth team.

In the summer of 2004, he left for Prato on loan, but in January 2005 returned to Milan. In the 2005-06 season, he was loaned out again, this time to Lecco.

=== Varese ===
In the summer of 2006, he joined Serie C2 side Varese in a co-ownership deal for €500. He was not the absolute starter of the team, but also played 28 league matches at the champions winning 2008-09 season. In 2009–10 season, he played 20 league matches as starter in 25 league appearances. Varese promotion to Serie B in 2010.

=== Bari ===
On 8 July 2011, Claiton was signed by Serie B club Bari on a free transfer and put pen to paper on a three-year deal. However, due to the financial crisis of Bari, he left the club in summer 2013.

=== Chievo ===
On 14 August 2013, Claiton was signed by Serie A club Chievo. Bari also signed half of the registration rights of Marco Calderoni for €90,000 on the same day.

=== Crotone ===
On 29 July 2014, Claiton was signed by Serie B club Crotone on a free transfer. At the end of the 2015–16 season he was initially released by Crotone, but on 14 July 2016 he signed a new two-year contract with the club.

=== Cremonese ===
On 21 July 2017 he was signed by Cremonese.

=== Catania ===
On 16 September 2020 Claiton signed a 2-year contract with Catania. On 9 April 2022, he was released together with all of his Catania teammates following the club's exclusion from Italian football due to its inability to overcome a number of financial issues.

== Honours ==
- Lega Pro Seconda Divisione: 2009
