= Antimo Iunco =

Italian footballer (born 1984)

Personal information
- Date of birth: 6 June 1984 (age 42)
- Place of birth: Brindisi, Italy
- Height: 1.73 m (5 ft 8 in)
- Position: Winger

Youth career
- Brindisi

Senior career*
Years	Team	Apps	(Gls)
2002–2004	Brindisi	12	(0)
2004–2007	Verona	92	(13)
2007–2010	Chievo	38	(5)
2009	→ Salernitana (loan)	16	(3)
2009–2010	→ Cittadella (loan)	32	(12)
2010–2011	Torino	20	(6)
2011–2012	Spezia	26	(4)
2012–2013	Chievo	0	(0)
2012–2013	→ Bari (loan)	30	(1)
2013–2015	Trapani	31	(2)
2015–2016	Alessandria	30	(4)
2016–2017	Paganese	12	(0)
2017–2018	Cittadella	16	(2)
Total		355	(52)

Managerial career
- 2026–: ASD Castrumfavara
- * Club domestic league appearances and goals

Antimo Iunco (born 6 June 1984) is an Italian former footballer who plays as a forward and head coach for Italian Serie D club ASD Castrumfavara.

== Club career ==
=== Early career ===
Iunco started his career at hometown club Brindisi. He followed the team to play at Serie C2 after winning the Serie D Group H champion in 2002. In January 2004, he joined Verona of Serie B in a co-ownership deal. He was made permanent in June 2004.

=== Chievo ===
After Verona relegated to Serie C1, he moved to cross town rival Chievo (in a co-ownership deal), which also relegated but from Serie A, where he won Serie A promotion in 2008. He made 19 league starts in 27 league appearances for the Serie B champion.

In June 2008, Chievo bought him outright. After the club signed Mauro Esposito on loan who had much more experience at Serie A, Iunco was out-favoured and in January 2009 loaned to Serie B struggler Salernitana after the club signed Stephen Makinwa.

=== Cittadella ===
On 30 August 2009, he joined Cittadella of Serie B, as part of the deal that Chievo signed Manuel Iori earlier, re-joining Chievo teammate Diego Oliveira. Iunco took number 7 shirt that previously owned by central midfielder Fabio Giordano.

In June 2010, Cittadella signed him in co-ownership deal for €500,000 and sold the remain 50% registration rights of Manuel Iori to Chievo.

=== Torino ===
On 12 July 2010, he was sold to fellow Serie B side Torino, and Chievo retained another 50% registration rights. (Chievo acquired Iunco outright for €700,000 and sold for €1M.) On 25 June 2011 Chievo regained all the registration rights for €99,000. It was also due to an auction error by Torino chairman Urbano Cairo, which offered €20,000 more than Chievo but did not sign it, thus it was not considered a valid offer.

=== Spezia ===
On 30 July 2011 Iunco joined Serie B club Spezia in another co-ownership deal for €150,000 fee. On 23 June 2012 Chievo bought back Iunco again, for just €750 fee.

=== Bari ===
In summer 2012 Iunco was loaned to Bari.

=== Trapani ===
On 19 August 2013 Iunco joined Trapani. On 23 January 2015 he was transferred to Alessandria.

=== Alessandria & Paganese ===
Iunco joined Serie C club Alessandria on 23 January 2015. He spent 1 1/2 seasons with the club.

In summer 2016 Iunco joined another Serie C club Paganese. However, he terminated his contract in a mutual consent in the winter transfer window.

=== Return to Cittadella ===
Iunco returned to Cittadella on 10 January 2017. On 18 July he signed a new contract.

== Honours ==
Chievo

- Serie B: 2007–08

Spezia

- Supercoppa di Lega di Prima Divisione: 2012
- Lega Pro Prima Divisione: 2011–12
- Coppa Italia Lega Pro: 2011–12
