= 2012–13 SS Virtus Lanciano 1924 season =

Italian football club season

This articles presents the performance of S.S. Virtus Lanciano 1924, an Italian association football club, during the 2012-2013 season. During this season, Virtus Lanciano hosted the first championship of Serie B in its history.

== Serie B ==
=== League table ===
Pos	Team	Pld	W	D	L	GF	GA	GD	Pts	Promotion or relegation
16	Juve Stabia	42	12	14	16	54	65	−11	50 (Note: CES: 8pts; CIT: 5pts; JST: 2pts)	
17	Reggina (Note: Modena and Reggina were docked 2 points due to the 2011 Italian football scandal.)	42	12	15	15	42	51	−9	49	
18	Virtus Lanciano (Note: No relegation playoffs will be held as Virtus Lanciano is more than 4 points clear of 4th-last place.)	42	9	21	12	50	60	−10	48	
19	Vicenza (R)	42	10	12	20	41	58	−17	42	Relegation to Lega Pro Prima Divisione
20	Ascoli (Note: Ascoli and Varese were docked 1 point due to the 2011 Italian football scandal.) (R)	42	11	9	22	48	67	−19	41	Relegation to Lega Pro Prima Divisione

Source: Serie B
Rules for classification: 1) points; 2) head-to-head points; 3) head-to-head goal difference; 4) head-to-head goals scored; 5) goal difference; 6) number of goals scored.
(R) Relegated

=== Matches ===
25 August 2012 Match 1	Calcio Padova	1 - 1	Virtus Lanciano	Padua
20:45	Renzetti 38'	Summary	Rosania (yellow card) 27'; Paghera (yellow card) 30'; Carlo Mammarella 56'; Angelo Casadei (yellow card) 90'	Stadium: Stadio Euganeo; Attendance: 2,050; Referee: Maurizio Mariani

1 September 2012 Match 2	Virtus Lanciano	1 - 2	Varese	Lanciano
20:45	Rosania (yellow card) 32'; Di Cecco 53'; Forfana (yellow card) 81'; Angelo Casadei (yellow card) 88'; Manuel Turchi (red card) 90+3'	Summary	Damonte (yellow card) 16'; Filipe (yellow card) 48'; Momentè (yellow card) 58'; Neto 72' (yellow card) 88'; Koné 85' (yellow card) 86'; Pucino (red card) 90+3'	Stadium: Stadio Guido Biondi; Attendance: 1,272; Referee: Fabrizio Pasqua

9 September 2012 Match 3	Virtus Lanciano	1 - 1	Ascoli	Lanciano
15:00	Paghera 21'; Di Cecco (yellow card) 27'	Summary	Ricci (yellow card) 28'; Zaza 48'; Pasqualini (yellow card) 58'; Manuel Scalise (yellow card) 62'	Stadium: Stadio Guido Biondi; Attendance: 2,284; Referee: Maurizio Ciampi

15 September 2012 Match 4	Cittadella	1 - 0	Virtus Lanciano	Cittadella
15:00	Pellizzer (yellow card) 33'; Sosa (yellow card) 34'; Di Carmine 75' (yellow card) 85'	Summary	Fofana (yellow card) 31'	Stadium: Stadio Pier Cesare Tombolato; Attendance: 401; Referee: Eugenio Abbattista

22 September 2012 Match 5	Virtus Lanciano	1 - 1	Grosseto	Lanciano
15:00	Almici (yellow card) 55'; Carlo Mammarella (yellow card) 58'; Manuel Turchi (yellow card) 64'; Forfana 69' (pen.)	Summary	Sforzini 45+4' (pen.); Jadid (yellow card) 47'; Olivi (yellow card) 73'; Crimi (yellow card) 81'	Stadium: Stadio Guido Biondi; Attendance: 750; Referee: Michael Fabbri

25 September 2012 Match 6	Reggina	0 - 1	Virtus Lanciano	Reggio Calabria
20:45	Bergamelli (yellow card) 22'; Adejo (yellow card) 86'; Rizzo (red card) 90+4'	Summary	Carlo Mammarella 15' (yellow card) 38'; Federico Amenta (yellow card) 30'; Almici (yellow card) 34'; Paghera (yellow card) 45'; Fofana (yellow card) 81'; Leali (yellow card) 90+1'	Stadium: Stadio Oreste Granillo; Attendance: 244; Referee: Frederico La Penna

29 September 2012 Match 7	Virtus Lanciano	1 - 1	Modena	Lanciano
15:00	Vastola (yellow card) 12' (yellow-red card) 41'; Carlo Mammarella 26'; Almici (yellow card) 58'; Fofana (yellow card) 85'	Summary	Signori (yellow card) 20' (goal) 48'; Lazarević (yellow card) 69'; Moretti (yellow card) 80'	Stadium: Stadio Guido Biondi; Attendance: 261; Referee: Francesco Castrignano

6 October 2012 Match 8	Brescia	2 - 0	Virtus Lanciano	Brescia
15:00	Stovini (yellow card) 14'; De Maio (yellow card) 34'; Budel 74' (yellow card) 82'; Caracciolo 89' (yellow card) 90+3'; Zambelli (yellow card) 90+2'	Summary	Carlo Mammarella (yellow card) 44'; Di Gecco (yellow card) 53'; Paghera (yellow card) 70'	Stadium: Stadio Mario Rigamonti; Attendance: 5,000; Referee: Gianluca Manganiello

14 October 2012 Match 9	Virtus Lanciano	1 - 1	Pro Vercelli	Lanciano
15:00	Carlo Mammarella (yellow card) 34'; Vastola 59'	Summary	Masi 4' (yellow card) 51'; Fabiano (yellow card) 86'	Stadium: Stadio Guido Biondi; Attendance: 278; Referee: Claudio Gavillucci

20 October 2012 Match 10	Virtus Lanciano	0 - 3	Empoli	Lanciano
15:00	Vastola (yellow card) 54'; Almici (yellow card) 61'; Ceccarelli (yellow card) 87'	Summary	Valdifiori (yellow card) 18'; Maccarone 19'; Vincent Laurini (yellow card) 37'; Cristiano (yellow card) 39'; Riccardo Saponara 45+3'; Daniele Croce (yellow card) 67'; Signorelli 69'	Stadium: Stadio Guido Biondi; Attendance: 303; Referee: Maurizio Mariani

27 October 2012 Match 11	Verona	2 - 0	Virtus Lanciano	Verona
15:00	Maietta (yellow card) 31'; Cacciatore (yellow card) 35'; Laner (yellow card) 35'; Gacia 78' (pen.); Gómez Taleb 85'	Summary	Di Gecco (yellow card) 18'; Pepe (yellow card) 35'; Leali (red card) 76'; Rosania (yellow card) 90+2'	Stadium: Stadio Marc'Antonio Bentegodi; Attendance: 1,242; Referee: Filippo Merchiori

30 October 2012 Match 12	Virtus Lanciano	1 - 1	Livorno	Lanciano
20:45	Paghera (yellow card) 31'; Vastola (yellow card) 67'; Volpe 90+1'	Summary	Schiattarella (yellow card) 24'; Lambrughi (yellow card) 33'; Belingheri 38' (yellow card) 57'; Gastsoglou (yellow card) 51'; Dionisi (yellow card) 65'; Federico Ceccherini (yellow card) 84'	Stadium: Stadio Guido Biondi; Attendance: 834; Referee: Francesco Borriello

3 November 2012 Match 13	Vicenza	0 - 1	Virtus Lanciano	Vicenza
15:00	Giacomelli (yellow card) 42'; Gentill (yellow card) 66'; Plasmati (yellow card) 70'; Brighenti (yellow card) 89'	Summary	Vastola 15'; Leali (yellow card) 32'; Falcinelli (yellow card) 42'; Rosania (yellow card) 68'; Paghera (yellow card) 74'	Stadium: Stadio Romeo Menti; Attendance: 718; Referee: Diego Roca

10 November 2012 Match 14	Juve Stabia	2 - 1	Virtus Lanciano	Castellammare di Stabia
15:00	Danilevičius 78'; Baldanzeddu (red card) 81'; Improta 90' (yellow card) 90'	Summary	Manuel Turchi 32'; Paghera (yellow card) 39'; Di Cecco (yellow card) 52'; Vastola (yellow card) 55'; Volpe (yellow card) 76'	Stadium: Stadio Romeo Menti; Attendance: 863; Referee: Michael Fabbri

17 November 2012 Match 15	Virtus Lanciano	0 - 3	Bari	Lanciano
15:00	Gouano (yellow card) 51'; Fofana (yellow card) 73'; Aquilanti (yellow card) 80'	Summary	Stefano Sabelli (yellow card) 23'; Francesco Fedato (yellow card) 27'; Romizi (yellow card) 29'; Daniele Sciaudone 31' (yellow card) 66'; Caputo 34', 51' (pen.); Claiton (yellow card) 36'	Stadium: Stadio Guido Biondi; Attendance: 843; Referee: Federico La Penna

24 November 2012 Match 16	Ternana Calcio	2 - 2	Virtus Lanciano	Terni
15:00	Litteri 39'; Vitale (yellow card) 45+1' (goal) 72' (pen.); Ragusa (yellow card) 87'	Summary	Di Cecco 42'; Manuel Turchi (yellow card) 45'; Aquilanti (yellow card) 71'; Carlo Mammarella (yellow card) 71'; Falcone 89'	Stadium: Stadio Libero Liberati; Referee: Francesco Castrignano

1 December 2012 Match 17	Virtus Lanciano	3 - 3	Cesena	Lanciano
15:00	Falcinelli (yellow card) 11' (goal) 90+2'; Fofana 28'; Falcone 51' (pen.); D'Aversa (yellow card) 56'	Summary	Succi 5', 22', 45+1'; Tonucci (yellow card) 33'; Rossi (yellow card) 50'	Stadium: Stadio Guido Biondi; Attendance: 1,847; Referee: Renzo Candussio

8 December 2012 Match 18	Crotone	0 - 0	Virtus Lanciano	Crotone
15:00		Summary	Vastola (yellow card) 47'; Federico Amenta (yellow card) 55'; Almici (yellow card) 65'; Paghera (yellow card) 88'	Stadium: Stadio Ezio Scida; Attendance: 1,037; Referee: Maurizio Ciampi

15 December 2012 Match 19	Virtus Lanciano	1 - 1	Spezia	Lanciano
15:00	Minotti (yellow card) 17' (goal) 37'; Volpe (yellow card) 23'	Summary	Sansovini (yellow card) 41'; Mandorlini (yellow card) 43'; Di Gennaro (yellow card) 52'; Okaka 67'	Stadium: Stadio Guido Biondi; Attendance: 354; Referee: Angelo Cervellera

23 December 2012 Match 20	Sassuolo	2 - 0	Virtus Lanciano	Modena
15:00	Raman Chibsah (yellow card) 14'; Missiroli 28'; Troianiello (yellow card) 50'; Leonardo Pavoletti 62'; Marzoratti (yellow card) 65'	Summary	Almici (yellow card) 19'; Federico Amenta (yellow card) 64'	Stadium: Stadio Alberto Braglia; Attendance: 3,049; Referee: Franceso Borriello

26 December 2012 Match 21	Virtus Lanciano	1 - 0	Novara	Lanciano
15:00	Minotti (yellow card) 73'; Manuel Turchi 84'	Summary	Perticone (yellow card) 40'; Barusso (yellow card) 61'; Ludi (yellow card) 67'; Buzzegoli (yellow card) 82'; Fernandes (yellow card) 86'; Alhassan (yellow card) 87'	Stadium: Stadio Guido Biondi; Attendance: 1,000; Referee: Diego Roca

30 December 2012 Match 22	Virtus Lanciano	2 - 1	Padova	Lanciano
15:00	Federico Amenta 63'; Di Cecco (yellow card) 72'; Aquilanti (yellow card) 76'; Paghera 77'	Summary	Thiago Rangel Cionek (yellow card) 24'; De Vitis (yellow card) 33' (goal) 61'; Anania (yellow card) 37'	Stadium: Stadio Guido Biondi; Attendance: 1,363; Referee: Luca Pairetto

26 January 2013 Match 23	Varese	1 - 2	Virtus Lanciano	Varese
15:00	Pucino (yellow card) 71'; Ebagua 75'	Summary	Manuel Turchi 44' (yellow card) 59'; Minotti (yellow card) 54'; Vastola (yellow card) 72'; Carlo Mammarella (yellow card) 77'; Volpe 85' (pen.) (yellow card) 89'	Stadium: Stadio Franco Ossola; Attendance: 3,331; Referee: Gianluca Manganiello

4 February 2013 Match 24	Ascoli	1 - 1	Virtus Lanciano	Ascoli Piceno
20:45	Zaza 41'; Peccarisi (yellow card) 56'; Soncin (yellow card) 75'	Summary	Piccolo 39'; Falcinelli (yellow card) 56'; D'Aversa (yellow card) 85'	Stadium: Stadio Cino e Lillo Del Duca; Attendance: 3,432; Referee: Eugenio Abbattista

9 February 2013 Match 25	Virtus Lanciano	3 - 2	Cittadella	Lanciano
15:00	Vastola 6' (yellow card) 27'; Volpe 13'; Falcinelli (yellow card) 30'; Piccolo 38'; Fofana (yellow card) 90+3'	Summary	Minesso (yellow card) 5' (goal) 8'; Schiavon (yellow card) 31'; Almici 51' (o.g.)	Stadium: Stadio Guido Biondi; Attendance: 2,100; Referee: Francesco Castrignano

16 February 2013 Match 26	Grosseto	2 - 2	Virtus Lanciano	Grosseto
15:00	Jadid (yellow card) 32'; Piovaccari 40', 90+4'; Calderoni (yellow card) 49'; Crimi (yellow card) 88'	Summary	Vastola (yellow card) 30' (yellow-red card); Minotti (yellow card) 42'; Plasmati 50' (yellow card) 73'; Piccolo 58'	Stadium: Stadio Olimpico Carlo Zecchini; Attendance: 1,490; Referee: Leonardo Baracani

23 February 2013 Match 27	Virtus Lanciano	3 - 1	Reggina	Lanciano
15:00	Fofana 20'; Volpe (yellow card) 44'; Almici (yellow card) 48'; Falcinelli 74'; Carlo Mammarella 90'	Summary	Antonazzo (yellow card) 18'; Comi 62'	Stadium: Stadio Guido Biondi; Attendance: 1,918; Referee: Dino Tommasi

26 February 2013 Match 28	Modena	2 - 2	Virtus Lanciano	Modena
20:45	Zoboli 22'; Pagano (yellow card) 24'; Ardemagni 36' (pen.); Gozzi (yellow card) 66' (yellow-red card)	Summary	Rosania (yellow card) 36' (yellow-red card); Carlo Mammarella (yellow card) 53'; Falcinelli 56'; Federico Amenta (yellow card) 71'; Manuel Turchi 90'	Stadium: Stadio Alberto Braglia; Attendance: 1,158; Referee: Federico La Penna

2 March 2013 Match 29	Virtus Lanciano	0 - 2	Brescia	Lanciano
15:00	Vastola (yellow card) 23'; Falcinelli (yellow card) 41'; Fofana (red card) 45+2'	Summary	Daprelà (yellow card) 23'; Budel (yellow card) 41'; De Maio (yellow card) 47'; Scaglia (yellow card) 50'; Caldirola (yellow card) 56'; Finazzi (yellow card) 60'; Rossi (yellow card) 69'; Corvia 74', 85'	Stadium: Stadio Guido Biondi; Attendance: 2,015; Referee: Massimiliano Irrati

9 March 2013 Match 30	Pro Vercelli	1 - 2	Virtus Lanciano	Varsei
15:00	Grossi 23' (pen.) (red card) 88'; Modolo (yellow card) 63'; Cristiano (yellow card) 76'; Sini (yellow card) 82'	Summary	Di Cecco 11'; Falcone 67'	Stadium: Stadio Silvio Piola; Attendance: 1,739; Referee: Luca Pairetto

16 March 2013 Match 31	Empoli	2 - 2	Virtus Lanciano	Empoli
15:00	Tavano 8', 36'	Summary	Plasmati 10', 35'	Stadium: Stadio Carlo Castellani; Attendance: 1,041; Referee: Diego Roca

19 March 2013 Match 32	Virtus Lanciano	1 - 2	Verona	Lanciano
20:45	Plasmati (yellow card) 11'; Piccolo 40' (yellow card) 41'; Di Cecco (yellow card) 58'; Volpe (red card) 90+3'	Summary	Lund Nielsen (yellow card) 18'; Raphael Martinho 33'; Cacia 90+1'	Stadium: Stadio Guido Biondi; Attendance: 2,893; Referee: Angelo Cervellera

24 March 2013 Match 33	Livorno	2 - 0	Virtus Lanciano	Livorno
15:00	Belingheri 37'; Paulinho 68'	Summary	D'Aversa (yellow card) 29'; Falcone (yellow card) 61'	Stadium: Stadio Armando Picchi; Attendance: 4,723; Referee: Fabrizio Pasqua

28 March 2013 Match 34	Virtus Lanciano	2 - 0	Vicenza	Lanciano
20:45	Plasmati 29'; Almici (yellow card) 33'; Castiglia 38' (o.g.); Minotti (yellow card) 90+2'	Summary	Padalino (yellow card) 23'; Camisa (yellow card) 28'; Semioli (red card) 33'; Rigoni (yellow card) 39'; Giacomelli (yellow card) 53'	Stadium: Stadio Guido Biondi; Attendance: 2,436; Referee: Leonardo Baracani

6 April 2013 Match 35	Virtus Lanciano	1 - 1	Juve Stabia	Lanciano
15:00	Volpe 80' (pen.)	Summary	Zito 30'; Gennaro Scognamiglio (yellow card) 52' (yellow-red card); Dicuonzo (yellow card) 64'; Figliomeni (yellow card) 78'; Bruno (yellow card) 81'	Stadium: Stadio Guido Biondi; Attendance: 1,120; Referee: Franceso Castrignano

13 April 2013 Match 36	Bari	4 - 3	Virtus Lanciano	Bari
15:00	Iunco (yellow card) 24'; Polenta (yellow card) 39'; Daniele Sciaudone 49' (yellow card) 73'; Caputo 63'; Defendi 67'; Tallo 69'; Lamanna (yellow card) 77'	Summary	Federico Amenta 1' (yellow card) 86'; Minotti (yellow card) 31'; Falcinelli 36' (yellow card) 37'; Piccolo 46'; Aquilanti (yellow card) 88' (yellow-red card)	Stadium: Stadio San Nicola; Attendance: 8,409; Referee: Emillio Ostinelli

=== Copa Italia ===
12 August 2012 Round 2	Crotone	3 - 2	Virtus Lanciano	Crotone
20:45	Matute (yellow card) 3'; Caetano Calil 15' (pen.); Antonio Galardo (yellow card) 34'; Ciano (yellow card) 41' (goal) 56'; Concetti (yellow card) 63'; Abruzzese (yellow card) 77'; Eramo 90'	Summary	Testardi 3'; Aquilanti (yellow card) 14'; Paghera (yellow card) 33'; Falcone 58'; Carlo Mammarella (yellow card) 75'	Stadium: Stadio Ezio Scida; Attendance: 1,870; Referee: Marco Di Bello
