= List of Italian football transfers winter 2015–16 =

This is a list of Italian football transfers featuring at least one Serie A or Serie B club which were completed from 4 January to 1 February 2016, the date which the winter transfer window closed. Free agents could join any club at any time.

== Transfers ==
Legend

- Those clubs in Italic indicate that the player already left the team on loan this season or new signing that immediately left the club

| Date | Name | Moving from | Moving to | Fee |
|---|---|---|---|---|
| 28 December 2015 | (Venezuela) Manuel Arteaga | (Venezuela) Zulia | Palermo | Undisclosed |
| 28 December 2015 | (Germany) Oliver Kragl | (Austria) Ried | Frosinone | Undisclosed |
| 1 January 2016 | (Argentina) Juan Iturbe | Roma | (England) Bournemouth | Loan |
| 1 January 2016 | Alessandro Mastalli | (Switzerland) Lugano | Milan | Loan return |
| 4 January 2016 | (Argentina) Maximiliano Moralez | Atalanta | (Mexico) León | Undisclosed |
| 4 January 2016 | (Argentina) Ricky Álvarez | Unattached | Sampdoria | Free |
| 4 January 2016 | (Brazil) Bruno Gomes | (Brazil) Internacional | Genoa | Loan |
| 4 January 2016 | (Netherlands) Urby Emanuelson | Unattached | Verona | Free |
| 4 January 2016 | Marco Crimi | Bologna | Carpi | Loan |
| 4 January 2016 | Emanuele Suagher | Atalanta | Carpi | Loan |
| 4 January 2016 | (Spain) Suso | Milan | Genoa | Loan |
| 4 January 2016 | Luca Rigoni | Palermo | Genoa | Undisclosed |
| 4 January 2016 | (France) Maxime Giron | Avellino | Melfi | Loan |
| 4 January 2016 | Luca Nizzetto | Modena | Trapani | Undisclosed |
| 4 January 2016 | Salvatore Caturano | Bari | Lecce | Loan |
| 4 January 2016 | Alessandro Sbaffo | Chievo | Avellino | Undisclosed |
| 4 January 2016 | Raffaele Pucino | Chievo | Avellino | Loan |
| 5 January 2016 | Giammario Piscitella | Roma | Bassano | Loan |
| 5 January 2016 | (Switzerland) Fabio Daprelà | Palermo | Carpi | Free |
| 5 January 2016 | Antonio Piccolo | Lanciano | Spezia | Undisclosed |
| 5 January 2016 | (Mexico) Rafael Márquez | Verona | (Mexico) Atlas | Free |
| 5 January 2016 | (Ghana) Kevin-Prince Boateng | (Germany) Schalke 04 | Milan | Free |
| 5 January 2016 | (Brazil) Jefferson | Latina | Casertana | Loan |
| 5 January 2016 | (Belgium) Mohamed Soumarè | Avellino | Melfi | Loan |
| 5 January 2016 | Luca Zanotti | Atalanta | Pro Patria | Loan |
| 5 January 2016 | Fabio Eguelfi | Inter | Prato | Loan |
| 6 January 2016 | (Serbia) Milan Biševac | (France) Lyon | Lazio | Undisclosed |
| 6 January 2016 | Fabrizio Paghera | Lanciano | Avellino | Undisclosed |
| 6 January 2016 | Mattia Spezzani | Verona | Ischia | Free |
| 7 January 2016 | Pietro Tripoli | Ascoli | Mantova | Undisclosed |
| 7 January 2016 | Nico Pulzetti | Bologna | Spezia | Undisclosed |
| 7 January 2016 | Daniele Mignanelli | Pescara | Reggiana | Loan |
| 7 January 2016 | Daniele Verde | Roma | Pescara | Loan |
| 7 January 2016 | (Argentina) Joel Acosta | (Argentina) Boca Juniors | Pescara | Loan |
| 7 January 2016 | Fabrizio Grillo | Pescara | Pavia | Undisclosed |
| 7 January 2016 | Filippo De Col | Cesena | Spezia | Loan return |
| 8 January 2016 | Giuseppe Pirrone | Ascoli | Pavia | Undisclosed |
| 8 January 2016 | Paolo Regoli | Latina | Livorno | Loan |
| 8 January 2016 | (Kosovo) Samir Ujkani | Genoa | Latina | Loan |
| 8 January 2016 | Bryan Cristante | (Portugal) Benfica | Palermo | Loan |
| 8 January 2016 | Antonio Zito | Avellino | Salernitana | Undisclosed |
| 8 January 2016 | (Romania) Bogdan Mitrea | (Romania) Viitorul Constanța | Ascoli | Undisclosed |
| 9 January 2016 | Alessio Di Massimo | Sant'Omero | Juventus | Loan |
| 9 January 2016 | (Spain) Rubén Palomeque | Bologna | Lucchese | Loan |
| 9 January 2016 | Nadir Minotti | Atalanta | Siena | Loan |
| 9 January 2016 | Alessandro Bacci | Fiorentina | Siena | Loan |
| 10 January 2016 | (Argentina) Ignacio Fideleff | Napoli | (Paraguay) Nacional Asunción | Undisclosed |
| 11 January 2016 | Cristiano Ingretolli | Pescara | Melfi | Loan |
| 11 January 2016 | (Cameroon) Joseph Minala | Lazio | Bari | Loan |
| 11 January 2016 | Paolo Parente | Genoa | Paganese | Undisclosed |
| 11 January 2016 | Luca Crecco | Lazio | Modena | Loan |
| 11 January 2016 | (Brazil) Henrique | Napoli | (Brazil) Fluminense | Undisclosed |
| 11 January 2016 | Federico Moretti | Latina | Vicenza | Loan |
| 11 January 2016 | Sergio Floccari | Sassuolo | Bologna | Undisclosed |
| 11 January 2016 | (Poland) Thiago Cionek | Modena | Palermo | Undisclosed |
| 11 January 2016 | (Argentina) Gonzalo Escalante | Catania | (Spain) Eibar | Undisclosed (Note: The player already played for his new club in this season: the transfer turned from temporary to definitive.) |
| 12 January 2016 | (Nigeria) Osarimen Giulio Ebagua | Como | Vicenza | Undisclosed |
| 12 January 2016 | (Switzerland) Zoran Josipovic | Juventus | (Switzerland) Aarau | Loan |
| 12 January 2016 | Matteo Mancosu | Bologna | Carpi | Loan |
| 12 January 2016 | Umberto Eusepi | Salernitana | Pisa | Undisclosed |
| 12 January 2016 | Marco Firenze | Crotone | Catanzaro | Loan |
| 12 January 2016 | Francesco Forte | Inter | Teramo | Loan |
| 13 January 2016 | (Colombia) Juan Camilo Zúñiga | Napoli | Bologna | Loan |
| 13 January 2016 | Luca Ceccarelli | Bologna | Salernitana | Loan |
| 13 January 2016 | (Brazil) Ronaldo Pompeu | Empoli | Lazio | Loan |
| 13 January 2016 | (Brazil) Ronaldo Pompeu | Lazio | Salernitana | Loan |
| 13 January 2016 | (Croatia) Franjo Prce | Lazio | Salernitana | Loan |
| 13 January 2016 | (Australia) Chris Ikonomidis | Lazio | Salernitana | Loan |
| 13 January 2016 | Giacomo Casoli | Como | Matera | Undisclosed |
| 13 January 2016 | (Croatia) Ricardo Bagadur | Fiorentina | Salernitana | Loan |
| 13 January 2016 | (Hungary) Norbert Balogh | (Hungary) Debreceni | Palermo | Undisclosed |
| 13 January 2016 | Stefano Pettinari | Roma | Como | Loan |
| 13 January 2016 | (Kenya) Mcdonald Mariga | Unattached | Latina | Free |
| 13 January 2016 | Stefano Sensi | Cesena | Sassuolo | Undisclosed |
| 13 January 2016 | Stefano Sensi | Sassuolo | Cesena | Loan |
| 13 January 2016 | Alessandro Diamanti | (China) Guangzhou Evergrande | Atalanta | Loan |
| 14 January 2016 | (Uruguay) Federico Gino | Carpi | (Uruguay) Defensor Sporting | Loan return |
| 14 January 2016 | Ciro Immobile | (Spain) Sevilla | Torino | Loan |
| 14 January 2016 | (Croatia) Ante Rebić | Fiorentina | Verona | Loan |
| 14 January 2016 | Mattia Vitale | Juventus | Lanciano | Loan |
| 14 January 2016 | King Udoh | Juventus | Lanciano | Loan |
| 14 January 2016 | Simone Salviato | Bari | Lanciano | Undisclosed |
| 14 January 2016 | Valerio Nava | Atalanta | Cittadella | Loan |
| 15 January 2016 | Edoardo Oneto | Sampdoria | (Spain) Real Oviedo | Loan |
| 15 January 2016 | Arturo Calabresi | Roma | Brescia | 18-month loan |
| 15 January 2016 | (Burkina Faso) Salif Dianda | Ternana | Martina Franca | Undisclosed |
| 16 January 2016 | Filippo Costa | (England) Bournemouth | Chievo | Loan return |
| 17 January 2016 | (Argentina) Emanuel Insúa | Udinese | (Argentina) Newell's Old Boys | Loan |
| 18 January 2016 | (Senegal) Joel Baraye | Brescia | Virtus Entella | Loan |
| 18 January 2016 | (Croatia) Mato Miloš | (Croatia) HNK Rijeka | Perugia | Loan |
| 18 January 2016 | Marco Migliorini | Juve Stabia | Avellino | Undisclosed |
| 18 January 2016 | (Montenegro) Marko Bakić | Fiorentina | (Portugal) Belenenses | Loan |
| 18 January 2016 | (Serbia) Nemanja Vidić | Internazionale | Unattached | Released |
| 18 January 2016 | (Albania) Berat Djimsiti | (Switzerland) Zürich | Atalanta | Free |
| 19 January 2016 | Rolando Mandragora | Genoa | Juventus | €6M |
| 19 January 2016 | Rolando Mandragora | Juventus | Pescara | Loan |
| 19 January 2016 | (Switzerland) Remo Freuler | (Switzerland) Luzern | Atalanta | Undisclosed |
| 19 January 2016 | Antonio Cinelli | Vicenza | Cagliari | Undisclosed |
| 19 January 2016 | Alex Dall'Amico | Arzignano | Vicenza | Undisclosed |
| 19 January 2016 | (Nigeria) David Okereke | Lavagnese | Spezia | Undisclosed |
| 19 January 2016 | Matteo Pessina | Milan | Catania | Loan |
| 19 January 2016 | (Brazil) Samir Santos | (Spain) Granada | Verona | Loan |
| 19 January 2016 | (England) Ashley Cole | Roma | Unattached | Released |
| 20 January 2016 | Leandro Rinaudo | Vicenza | Unattached | Released |
| 20 January 2016 | Carlo Mammarella | Lanciano | Pro Vercelli | Undisclosed |
| 20 January 2016 | (Brazil) Matuzalém | Verona | (United States) Miami | Free |
| 20 January 2016 | Rolando Bianchi | (Spain) Mallorca | Perugia | Undisclosed |
| 20 January 2016 | Martino Borghese | Como | Livorno | Undisclosed |
| 20 January 2016 | Maurizio Lanzaro | Salernitana | Foggia | Free |
| 20 January 2016 | Marcello Trotta | Avellino | Sassuolo | Undisclosed |
| 21 January 2016 | (Brazil) Dodô | Inter | Sampdoria | Loan |
| 21 January 2016 | Stefano Sabelli | Bari | Carpi | Loan |
| 21 January 2016 | (Croatia) Tonći Kukoč | Livorno | Como | Undisclosed |
| 21 January 2016 | (Argentina) Tino Costa | (Russia) Spartak Moscow | Fiorentina | Loan |
| 21 January 2016 | Federico Bonazzoli | Sampdoria | Lanciano | Loan |
| 21 January 2016 | (Uruguay) Jaime Báez | Fiorentina | Livorno | Loan |
| 21 January 2016 | Davide Lanzafame | Perugia | Novara | Undisclosed |
| 21 January 2016 | (Brazil) Tulio Bagatini | Trapani | San Marino | Loan |
| 21 January 2016 | (Uruguay) Nicolás López | Udinese | (Uruguay) Nacional | Loan |
| 21 January 2016 | (Sweden) Melker Hallberg | Udinese | (Sweden) Hammarby | Loan |
| 21 January 2016 | (Brazil) Marquinho | Udinese | (Saudi Arabia) Al-Ahli | Loan |
| 21 January 2016 | (Brazil) Lucas Evangelista | Udinese | (Greece) Panathinaikos | Loan |
| 21 January 2016 | (Croatia) Josip Brezovec | Spezia | (Croatia) HNK Rijeka | Loan return |
| 21 January 2016 | Francesco Di Mariano | Roma | Monopoli | Loan |
| 21 January 2016 | Nicola Bellomo | Chievo | Vicenza | 18-month loan |
| 21 January 2016 | (Slovenia) Žan Benedičič | Como | Ascoli | Undisclosed |
| 21 January 2016 | (Serbia) Zdravko Kuzmanović | (Switzerland) Basel | Udinese | Loan |
| 22 January 2016 | (Argentina) Mauro Zárate | (England) West Ham United | Fiorentina | Undisclosed |
| 22 January 2016 | (Argentina) Nicolás Spolli | Carpi | Chievo | Free |
| 22 January 2016 | Leonardo Fontanesi | Sassuolo | Cesena | Loan |
| 22 January 2016 | Giuseppe Rossi | Fiorentina | (Spain) Levante | Loan |
| 22 January 2016 | (Poland) Kamil Wilczek | Carpi | (Denmark) Brøndby | Undisclosed |
| 22 January 2016 | Alessio Cerci | (Spain) Atlético Madrid | Genoa | Loan |
| 22 January 2016 | Giampietro Perrulli | Salernitana | Lupa Roma | Undisclosed |
| 23 January 2016 | (The Gambia) Ali Sowe | Chievo | Lecce | Loan |
| 23 January 2016 | Antonio Rozzi | Lazio | Siena | Loan |
| 24 January 2016 | (Togo) Serge Gakpé | Genoa | Atalanta | Loan |
| 25 January 2016 | Fabio Gavazzi | Novara | Südtirol | Loan |
| 25 January 2016 | Andrea Petagna | Milan | Atalanta | Undisclosed |
| 25 January 2016 | Andrea Petagna | Atalanta | Ascoli | Loan |
| 25 January 2016 | (Spain) Pol García | Juventus | Crotone | Loan |
| 25 January 2016 | Nicolò Fazzi | Fiorentina | Crotone | Loan |
| 26 January 2016 | (Spain) Cristian Tello | (Spain) Barcelona | Fiorentina | Loan |
| 26 January 2016 | Mattia Zaccagni | Cittadella | Verona | Loan |
| 26 January 2016 | (France) Eddy Gnahoré | Carrarese | Napoli | Undisclosed |
| 26 January 2016 | (France) Eddy Gnahoré | Napoli | Carpi | 18-month loan |
| 26 January 2016 | Filippo Penna | Lanciano | Paganese | Loan |
| 26 January 2016 | Richard Marcone | Trapani | Verona | Loan |
| 26 January 2016 | (Brazil) Rafael | Verona | Cagliari | Loan |
| 26 January 2016 | Stephan El Shaarawy | Milan | Roma | Loan |
| 26 January 2016 | Simone Benedetti | Cagliari | Virtus Entella | Loan |
| 26 January 2016 | (Croatia) Josip Posavec | (Croatia) Inter Zaprešić | Palermo | Loan return |
| 26 January 2016 | (Venezuela) Manuel Arteaga | Palermo | (Croatia) Hajduk | Loan |
| 26 January 2016 | (Brazil) Matheus Cassini | Palermo | (Croatia) Inter Zaprešić | Loan |
| 26 January 2016 | Alessio Cragno | Cagliari | Lanciano | Loan |
| 26 January 2016 | (Ghana) Richmond Boakye | Atalanta | Latina | Undisclosed |
| 26 January 2016 | Simone Colombi | Cagliari | Carpi | Loan |
| 26 January 2016 | Emanuele Berrettoni | Ascoli | Pordenone | Undisclosed |
| 26 January 2016 | (Denmark) Anders Christiansen | Chievo | (Sweden) Malmö | Undisclosed |
| 26 January 2016 | (Uruguay) Agustín Olivera | Modena | Catanzaro | Loan |
| 26 January 2016 | (Switzerland) Karim Rossi | Spezia | Lugano | Loan |
| 27 January 2016 | Alberto Grassi | Atalanta | Napoli | Undisclosed |
| 27 January 2016 | (Ivory Coast) Gervinho | Roma | Hebei China Fortune | €18M |
| 27 January 2016 | Federico Dimarco | Inter | Ascoli | Loan |
| 27 January 2016 | (France) Issa Cissokho | Genoa | Bari | Loan |
| 27 January 2016 | Andrea Tabanelli | Cesena | Pisa | Loan |
| 27 January 2016 | Luigi Grassi | Ascoli | S.P.A.L. | Loan |
| 27 January 2016 | (France) Dominique Malonga | (Scotland) Hibernian | Pro Vercelli | Undisclosed |
| 27 January 2016 | Francesco Benussi | Carpi | Vicenza | Free |
| 27 January 2016 | (Albania) Kastriot Dermaku | Empoli | Pavia | Loan |
| 27 January 2016 | (Ivory Coast) Cedric Tchoutou | Roma | Siena | Loan |
| 27 January 2016 | (Colombia) Fredy Guarín | Inter | (China) Shanghai Shenhua | Undisclosed |
| 27 January 2016 | Marco Sansovini | Pescara | Cremonese | Loan |
| 27 January 2016 | (Bosnia and Herzegovina) Gordan Bunoza | Pescara | Unattached | Released |
| 27 January 2016 | Danilo Bulevardi | Pescara | L'Aquila | Loan |
| 28 January 2016 | Gennaro Tutino | Napoli | Bari | Loan |
| 28 January 2016 | Jacopo Dezi | Napoli | Bari | Loan |
| 28 January 2016 | (Bosnia and Herzegovina) Enis Nadarević | Trapani | Novara | Loan |
| 28 January 2016 | Francesco Bardi | Inter | Frosinone | Loan |
| 28 January 2016 | Andrea Ranocchia | Inter | Sampdoria | Loan |
| 28 January 2016 | (Guinea) Gaston Camara | Inter | Modena | Loan |
| 28 January 2016 | Gabriel Montaperto | Pergolettese | Cagliari | Undisclosed |
| 28 January 2016 | Tommaso Bianchi | (England) Leeds United | Ascoli | Loan+Buy |
| 28 January 2016 | Fabrizio Poli | Novara | Carpi | Loan return |
| 28 January 2016 | Marco Borriello | Carpi | Atalanta | Undisclosed |
| 28 January 2016 | Eric Lanini | Juventus | Como | Loan |
| 28 January 2016 | (Uruguay) Andrés Schetino | Fiorentina | Livorno | Loan |
| 28 January 2016 | (Netherlands) Jonathan de Guzmán | Napoli | Carpi | Loan |
| 28 January 2016 | Simone Petricciuolo | Avellino | Melfi | Loan |
| 28 January 2016 | Giuliano Regolanti | Frosinone | Prato | Loan |
| 28 January 2016 | Luca Marrone | Juventus | Verona | Loan |
| 28 January 2016 | Accursio Bentivegna | Como | Palermo | Loan return |
| 28 January 2016 | (France) Mohamed Fofana | Lanciano | Lupa Roma | Undisclosed |
| 28 January 2016 | (Portugal) Aladje | Sassuolo | Ischia | Loan |
| 28 January 2016 | Marco Frediani | Roma | Ancona | Loan |
| 28 January 2016 | Alberto Libertazzi | Novara | Ancona | Loan |
| 28 January 2016 | Roberto Gagliardini | Vicenza | Atalanta | Loan return |
| 29 January 2016 | (Slovakia) Milan Škriniar | (Slovakia) Žilina | Sampdoria | Undisclosed |
| 29 January 2016 | Alberto Paloschi | Chievo Verona | (Wales) Swansea City | Undisclosed |
| 29 January 2016 | Mattia Placido | Sampdoria | Savona | Loan |
| 29 January 2016 | Éder | Sampdoria | Inter | 18-month loan |
| 29 January 2016 | (Serbia) David Milinković | Genoa | Lanciano | Loan |
| 29 January 2016 | Salvatore Monaco | Arezzo | Perugia | Undisclosed |
| 29 January 2016 | (Portugal) João Silva | (Portugal) Paços de Ferreira | Avellino | Undisclosed |
| 29 January 2016 | (Bosnia and Herzegovina) Ervin Zukanović | Sampdoria | Roma | Loan |
| 29 January 2016 | Gennaro Troianiello | Salernitana | Ternana | Loan |
| 29 January 2016 | Davide Di Molfetta | Milan | Rimini | Loan |
| 30 January 2016 | (Spain) Mario Suárez | Fiorentina | (England) Watford | Undisclosed |
| 30 January 2016 | Jacopo Sala | Verona | Sampdoria | Loan+Buy |
| 30 January 2016 | Francesco Signori | Novara | Vicenza | Undisclosed |
| 30 January 2016 | (Iceland) Emil Hallfreðsson | Verona | Udinese | Undisclosed |
| 30 January 2016 | (Switzerland) Roberto Rodríguez | Novara | (Germany) Greuther Fürth | Loan |
| 30 January 2016 | Andrea Mantovani | Vicenza | Novara | Undisclosed |
| 30 January 2016 | (Brazil) Ryder Matos | Fiorentina | Udinese | Undisclosed |
| 30 January 2016 | (Portugal) Diogo Figueiras | Genoa | (Spain) Sevilla | Loan return |
| 30 January 2016 | Daniele Sciaudone | Salernitana | Spezia | Loan |
| 31 January 2016 | (Uruguay) Rodrigo Aguirre | Udinese | Perugia | Loan |
| 31 January 2016 | (Chile) Manuel Iturra | Udinese | (Spain) Rayo Vallecano | Loan |
| 31 January 2016 | (Bosnia and Herzegovina) Sanjin Prcić | Torino | Perugia | Loan |
| 1 February 2016 | (Guinea) Kévin Constant | Unattached | Bologna | Free |
| 1 February 2016 | Michele Rocca | Sampdoria | Lanciano | Loan |
| 1 February 2016 | Nicolò Gigli | Lecce | Fiorentina | Loan return |
| 1 February 2016 | Riccardo Fiamozzi | Pescara | Genoa | Undisclosed |
| 1 February 2016 | Gabriel Silva | Udinese | Genoa | Loan |
| 1 February 2016 | Luca Antonini | Ascoli | Livorno | Loan |
| 1 February 2016 | Federico Barba | Empoli | (Germany) VfB Stuttgart | Loan |
| 1 February 2016 | (Ghana) Amidu Salifu | Fiorentina | Brescia | Loan |
| 1 February 2016 | (Poland) Dominik Furman | (France) Toulouse | Verona | Loan |
| 1 February 2016 | Fabio Quagliarella | Torino | Sampdoria | Loan+Buy |
| 1 February 2016 | (Morocco) Ismail H'Maidat | Brescia | Roma | Undisclosed |
| 1 February 2016 | (Morocco) Ismail H'Maidat | Roma | Ascoli | Loan |
| 1 February 2016 | Michele Somma | Roma | Brescia | Undisclosed |
| 1 February 2016 | (Slovakia) Šimon Štefanec | (Slovakia) Slovan Bratislava | Verona | Loan |
| 1 February 2016 | (North Macedonia) Nikola Jakimovski | Como | Bari | Undisclosed |
| 1 February 2016 | Luca Mazzitelli | Roma | Sassuolo | Undisclosed |
| 1 February 2016 | Luca Mazzitelli | Sassuolo | Brescia | Loan |
| 1 February 2016 | Lorenzo Ariaudo | Sassuolo | Empoli | Loan |
| 1 February 2016 | (France) Modibo Diakité | Frosinone | Sampdoria | Undisclosed |
| 1 February 2016 | (Ivory Coast) Seydou Doumbia | Roma | (England) Newcastle | Loan |
| 1 February 2016 | Mattia Valoti | Verona | Livorno | Loan |
| 1 February 2016 | Marco Soprano | Genoa | Bassano | Loan |
| 1 February 2016 | Agostino Camigliano | Udinese | Trapani | Loan |
| 1 February 2016 | (Cameroon) Didiba Joss | Perugia | Juventus | Loan |
| 1 February 2016 | Nicola Falasco | Pistoiese | Roma | Undisclosed |
| 1 February 2016 | Nicola Falasco | Roma | Cesena | Loan |
| 1 February 2016 | Matteo Cortesi | Como | Cagliari | Loan |
| 1 February 2016 | Salvatore Molina | Atalanta | Perugia | Loan |
| 1 February 2016 | (France) Prince-Desir Gouano | Atalanta | (Turkey) Gaziantepspor | Loan |
| 1 February 2016 | Vasco Regini | Sampdoria | Napoli | Loan |
| 1 February 2016 | (Albania) Emanuele Ndoj | Roma | Brescia | Undisclosed |
| 1 February 2016 | (Albania) Emanuele Ndoj | Brescia | Roma | Loan |
| 1 February 2016 | Daniele Mori | Udinese | Santarcangelo | Loan |
| 1 February 2016 | Giovanni La Camera | Pavia | Como | Undisclosed |
| 1 February 2016 | Francesco Pisano | (England) Bolton | Avellino | Loan |
| 1 February 2016 | (Uruguay) Kevin Méndez | Roma | (Switzerland) Lausanne | Loan |
| 1 February 2016 | Andrea Coda | Sampdoria | Pescara | Loan |
| 1 February 2016 | (Brazil) Gilberto | Fiorentina | Verona | Loan |
| 1 February 2016 | (Belgium) Nicolas Napol | Avellino | Atalanta | Loan return |
| 1 February 2016 | Samuel Di Carmine | Perugia | Virtus Entella | Loan |
| 1 February 2016 | (Croatia) Andrija Balić | (Croatia) Hajduk Split | Udinese | Undisclosed |
| 1 February 2016 | (Argentina) Diego Perotti | Genoa | Roma | Loan |
| 1 February 2016 | (Tunisia) Yohan Benalouane | (England) Leicester | Fiorentina | Loan |
| 1 February 2016 | Antonio Floro Flores | Sassuolo | Chievo | Loan+Buy |
| 1 February 2016 | (Greece) Panagiotis Kone | Udinese | Fiorentina | Loan |
| 1 February 2016 | (Ghana) Edmund Hottor | Unattached | Inter | Free |
| 1 February 2016 | (Ghana) Edmund Hottor | Inter | (Portugal) Atlético CP | Loan |
| 1 February 2016 | (Serbia) Nikola Ninković | (Serbia) FK Partizan | Chievo | Undisclosed |
| 1 February 2016 | (Brazil) Victor da Silva | Chievo | (Croatia) NK Istra | Loan |
| 1 February 2016 | (Spain) Joan Verdú | Fiorentina | (Spain) Levante | Free |
| 1 February 2016 | (Colombia) Jhon Fredy Miranda | (Colombia) Independiente Santa Fe | Chievo | 18-month loan |
| 1 February 2016 | (Ukraine) Oleksandr Iakovenko | Fiorentina | Unattached | Released |
| 1 February 2016 | (Spain) Miguel de las Cuevas | Spezia | (Spain) Osasuna | Free |
| 1 February 2016 | Michele Pazienza | Vicenza | Unattached | Released |
| 1 February 2016 | Nicolò Corticchia | Vicenza | Paganese | Loan |
| 1 February 2016 | Francesco Bergamini | Bologna | Lanciano | Loan |
| 1 February 2016 | Juri Cisotti | Spezia | Vicenza | Loan |
| 1 February 2016 | Andrea Pinton | Inter | Vicenza | Loan |
| 1 February 2016 | (Netherlands) Fabian Sporkslede | Chievo | Lupa Castelli Romani | Loan |
| 1 February 2016 | (Spain) Mamadou Tounkara | Lazio | Salernitana | Loan |
| 1 February 2016 | Leonardo Gatto | Vicenza | Salernitana | Loan |
| 1 February 2016 | Matteo Gentili | Vicenza | Unattached | Released |
| 1 February 2016 | (Spain) Martín Montoya | Inter | (Spain) Barcelona | Loan return |
| 1 February 2016 | (Romania) Sergiu Buș | (England) Sheffield Wednesday | Salernitana | Loan |
| 1 February 2016 | (Slovenia) Tim Matavž | (Germany) FC Augsburg | Genoa | Loan |
| 1 February 2016 | Luca Forte | Pescara | Pro Vercelli | Loan |
| 1 February 2016 | Alessandro Ligi | Bari | Vicenza | Loan |
| 1 February 2016 | (Croatia) Robert Krišto | Spezia | Tuttocuoio | Loan |
| 1 February 2016 | Fabrizio Brignani | Cremonese | Bologna | Loan |
| 1 February 2016 | Alessandro Budel | Brescia | Pro Vercelli | Free |
| 1 February 2016 | Davide Bertoncini | Frosinone | Modena | Loan |
| 1 February 2016 | (Ukraine) Vasyl Pryima | Torino | Frosinone | Loan |
| 1 February 2016 | Ernesto Starita | Pisa | Pro Vercelli | Loan return |
| 1 February 2016 | Mattia Lombardo | Mantova | Pro Vercelli | Loan return |
| 1 February 2016 | (Croatia) Marijan Ćorić | Spezia | Unattached | Released |
| 1 February 2016 | Camillo Schiazza | Castel D'Ario | Trapani | Undisclosed |
| 1 February 2016 | Manuel Giandonato | Padova | Lanciano | Loan |
| 1 February 2016 | Claudio Sparacello | Trapani | Padova | Loan |
| 1 February 2016 | Francesco Bolzoni | Palermo | Novara | Free |
| 1 February 2016 | Antonio Mazzotta | Cesena | Pescara | Loan |
| 1 February 2016 | Luca Bruno | Crotone | L'Aquila | Loan |
| 1 February 2016 | Filippo Porcari | Bari | Carpi | Loan |
| 1 February 2016 | Andrea Lazzari | Carpi | Bari | Undisclosed |
| 1 February 2016 | (Croatia) Bruno Petković | Catania | Trapani | Loan |
| 1 February 2016 | Filippo Falco | Bologna | Cesena | Loan |
| 1 February 2016 | Cristian Pasquato | Juventus | Pescara | Loan |
| 1 February 2016 | (Brazil) Caio De Cenco | Pavia | Trapani | Loan |
| 1 February 2016 | Daniel Di Nicola | Pescara | Lanciano | Loan |
| 1 February 2016 | Simone Verdi | Milan | Carpi | Loan |
| 1 February 2016 | Nunzio Di Roberto | Pro Vercelli | Crotone | Undisclosed |
| 1 February 2016 | (Morocco) Abdelhamid El Kaoutari | Palermo | (France) Reims | Loan |
| 1 February 2016 | Pasquale De Vita | Trapani | Paganese | Loan |
| 2 February 2016 | (Argentina) Germán Denis | Atalanta | (Argentina) Independiente | Free |
| 3 February 2016 | (Netherlands) Nigel de Jong | Milan | (United States) LA Galaxy | Free |
| 4 February 2016 | Fabiano Santacroce | Unattached | Ternana | Free |
| 4 February 2016 | Denílson | Salernitana | (China) Hangzhou | Undisclosed |
