= Marco Di Benedetto =

Italian footballer

Personal information
- Date of birth: 5 August 1995 (age 31)
- Place of birth: Nuoro, Italy
- Position: Midfielder

Team information
- Current team: Civitanovese

Youth career
- Pescara
- 2011–2014: Juventus

Senior career*
Years	Team	Apps	(Gls)
2014–2015	Juventus	0	(0)
2014–2015	→ FeralpiSalò (loan)	15	(0)
2015–2016	Lanciano	0	(0)
2016–2018	San Nicolò	39	(10)
2018	US Levico Terme	8	(0)
2018–2019	Forlì	12	(1)
2019	L'Aquila		
2019–2020	Polisportiva Torrese		
2020–2021	Nereto Calcio		
2021	Lanciano		
2021	Sambuceto Calcio		
2021–	Civitanovese		

International career
2011	Italy U16	3	(1)
2011	Italy U17	3	(0)
- * Club domestic league appearances and goals as of 01:48, 23 January 2020 (UTC)

Marco Di Benedetto (born 5 August 1995) is an Italian footballer who plays as a midfielder for Civitanovese.

== Club career ==
=== Pescara ===
Di Benedetto started his career at Abruzzese club Pescara.

=== Juventus ===
On 17 August 2011 Di Benedetto was signed by Juventus for €450,000, rejoining former Pescara team-mate Luca Del Papa. Di Benedetto only played 8 times for the reserve team in the 2012–13 season. Di Benedetto signed his first professional contract in 2013, keeping him until 2016. Di Benedetto played twice in 2013–14 UEFA Youth League.

=== FeralpiSalò (loan) ===
On 31 January 2014 Di Benedetto was farmed to Lega Pro Prima Divisione club FeralpiSalò. On 17 July 2014 the loan was renewed, which the club also signed fellow midfielder Michele Cavion from Turin.

=== Lanciano ===
On 8 July 2015 Serie B club Lanciano signed Di Benedetto and Penna from Juventus, as part of the deal that Mame Baba Thiam moved to Turin outright in June.

=== Later career ===
After four months at L'Aquila, Di Benedetto joined Polisportiva Torrese 1974 in December 2019. On 12 August 2020, he moved to Nereto Calcio. On 8 April 2021, Di Benedetto signed with Lanciano. In July 2021, he joined ASD Sambuceto Calcio.

In December 2021, Di Benedetto moved to Civitanovese Calcio.

== International career ==
Di Benedetto played six friendlies for Italy national youth teams. However, he was not selected to 2012 UEFA European Under-17 Championship qualification.
