= Andrea Mengoni =

Italian footballer (born 1983)

Personal information
- Date of birth: 16 September 1983 (age 43)
- Place of birth: Rome, Italy
- Height: 1.87 m (6 ft 2 in)
- Position: Centre-back

Senior career*
Years	Team	Apps	(Gls)
2000–2001	Acilia	31	(0)
2001–2003	Castel di Sangro	36	(0)
2003–2009	Chievo	0	(0)
2003–2004	→ Chieti (loan)	14	(1)
2004–2005	→ Fermana (loan)	43	(3)
2005–2006	→ Cesena (loan)	30	(1)
2006	→ Frosinone (loan)	0	(0)
2006–2007	→ Grosseto (loan)	27	(3)
2007–2008	→ Avellino (loan)	37	(0)
2008–2009	→ Piacenza (loan)	17	(0)
2009–2011	Pescara	69	(3)
2011–2012	Barletta	28	(0)
2012–2014	Benevento	50	(6)
2014–2018	Ascoli	102	(3)
2018	Virtus Francavilla	5	(0)
2019–2020	Sangiustese	13	(0)
2020–2021	SSD Sangiorgese Monterubbianese		
2021–2022	SSD Sangiorgese Calcio 1922		
Total		502	(20)

International career
2003–2004	Italy U20 Serie C		
- * Club domestic league appearances and goals

Andrea Mengoni (born 16 September 1983) is an Italian former footballer who plays as a centre back.

== Club career ==
=== Early career ===
Born in Rome, Lazio, Mengoni started his career at Eccellenza Lazio team Acilia, located in the frazione of the same name. At age 18, he was signed by Castel di Sangro. He followed the team relegated to Serie C2 in 2002. Mengoni also played for its Berretti under-20 team in 2002–03 season.

=== Chievo and loans ===
In July 2003, Mengoni was signed by Serie A club Chievo. He was farmed to Chieti of Serie C1 in co-ownership deal. In January 2004 he was loaned to Fermana. At the end of the season, Fermana survived from the Serie C1 relegation "play-out". In June 2004 Chievo bought back the 50% registration rights from Chieti. Fermana also extended the loan in 2004–05 Serie C1 and survived from relegation again.

In August 2005, he was signed by Cesena of Serie B. In his maiden season, he played 30 games, but not most of them were one of the starters.

In July 2006, he was signed by second division club Frosinone along with Francesco Carbone. Mengoni played in pre-season friendlies. He wore no.31 shirt for Frosinone. Mengoni played his only game against S.S.C. Napoli, in 3–4–1–2 formation. The cup match Frosinone lost to Napoli 1–3. On 31 August 2006 he left for Grosseto of the third division.

In August 2007, Mengoni was signed by Serie B newcomer Avellino along with Carbone in another co-ownership deal for €10,000 each, with Di Cecco returned to Chievo for €20,000. despite Chievo was relegated to the same level. Mengoni made 37 starts in 2007–08 Serie B. Avellino relegated at the end of season. In June Chievo bought back Mengoni for free (Note: Instead of fully write-down the value of retained 50% registration rights of Mengoni of €10,000, Chievo turned Mengoni's new contract value to €10,000 (instead of 0) and amortize €7,500 in total in 2008–09 and 2009–10 financial year, made his contract residual value was €2,500 in July 2010.) and sold Carbone outright for free. (Note: Based on financial cost of €10,000 from Carbone's co-ownership deal.) Avellino later re-admitted to 2008–09 Serie B.

Mengoni was spotted by another Serie B team Piacenza along with Cesare Rickler. However, he only played 17 times in 2008–09 Serie B.

=== Pescara ===
In the seventh season as an intangible asset or as co-ownership credit of Chievo, Mengoni was loaned to Pescara of 2009–10 Lega Pro Prima Divisione, with option to purchase. Mengoni was one the member to help Pescara gain promotion back to 2010–11 Serie B. In July 2010 Pescara acquired him in co-ownership deal, for €100,000, signing a 2-year contract. Mengoni was one of the absolute starter of Pescara in 2010–11 Serie B. He wore no.5 shirt that season. In June 2011 Chievo gave up the remain 50% registration rights and Pescara also gave up Francesco Dettori for free.

However Mengoni fell out from the club plan, his no.5 shirt was taken by Marco Capuano and offered a temporary number of 92. Along with Matarazzo (39), Olivi (42), Sembroni (43), Romito (55), Fruci (59), Ragni (76), Ariatti (78), D'Alterio (80), Prisco (87), Tognozzi (88), Tabacco (90) and Ganci (99), they all left the club, except Cattenari (57) and Ragni, who returned to the team in mid-season.

=== Barletta & Benevento ===
On 31 August 2011, Mengoni was transferred to the third division club Barletta. Mengoni was the starting centre-backs along with Vincenzo Migliaccio.

On 20 August 2012, he terminated the contract On the next day he joined Benevento on free transfer.

=== Virtus Francavilla ===
On 31 August 2018, he signed with Serie C club Virtus Francavilla. On 6 November 2018, he was released from his contract by mutual consent.

== International career ==
Mengoni received call-up from Italy U20 Serie C in 2002–03 Mirop Cup. Italy U20 C was the champion. He also received call-up for friendlies against England C in February 2004 and November 2004. However, he did not enter the final lineup in November.
