= Minotti (surname) =

Minotti is an Italian surname. Notable people with the surname include:

- Lorenzo Minotti (born 1967), Italian footballer
- Nadir Minotti (born 1992), Italian footballer
- Christian Minotti, Italian long-distance swimmer
- Felice Minotti, (1887–1963), Italian actor
