= Nicolas Delvecchio =

Italian footballer

Personal information
- Date of birth: 12 March 1998 (age 28)
- Place of birth: Rome, Italy
- Position: Forward

Team information
- Current team: Lanciano

Youth career
- –2016: Lupa Roma

Senior career*
Years	Team	Apps	(Gls)
2016–2017	Anzio	31	(3)
2017–2018	Virtus Francavilla	4	(0)
2018	Olbia	1	(0)
2019	Igea 1946	6	(0)
2019–2020	Bangor City		
2020	Boca Gibraltar		
2021–	Lanciano		
- * Club domestic league appearances and goals as of 18:04, 2 March 2021 (UTC)

Nicolas Delvecchio (born 12 March 1998) is an Italian footballer who plays as a forward for Lanciano. He is the son of former Italian international footballer Marco Delvecchio.

== Club statistics ==
=== Club ===
As of 25 August 2020.

Club	Season	League			Cup		Other		Total	
Club	Season	Division	Apps	Goals	Apps	Goals	Apps	Goals	Apps	Goals
Anzio	2016–17	Serie D	31	3	0	0	0	0	31	3
Virtus Francavilla	2017–18	Serie C	4	0	0	0	0	0	4	0
Olbia	2017–18	Serie C	1	0	0	0	0	0	1	0
Igea 1946	2018–19	Serie D	6	0	0	0	0	0	6	0
Career total			42	3	0	0	0	0	42	3
