= Palmese =

Palmese may refer to a pair of Italian football clubs:

- U.S. Palmese 1912, based in Palmi (RC), Calabria
- U.S.D. Palmese, based in Palma Campania (NA), Campania
