= Pirrone =

Pirrone is a surname. Notable people with the surname include:

- Pirrone (philosopher), a Greek philosopher of Classical antiquity
- Elena Pirrone (born 1999), Italian racing cyclist
- Giuseppe Pirrone (born 1986), Italian professional footballer
- Giuseppe Fortunato Pirrone (1898–1978), Italian sculptor

== See also ==
- Perrone
