= Alberto Almici =

Italian footballer (born 1993)

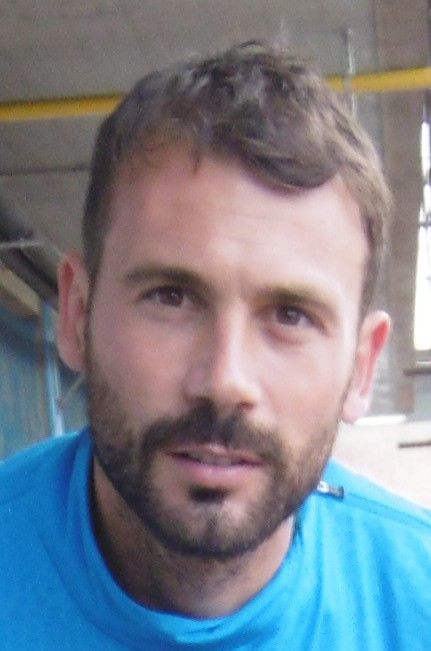

Personal information
- Date of birth: 11 January 1993 (age 33)
- Place of birth: Bergamo, Italy
- Height: 1.82 m (6 ft 0 in)
- Position: Right back

Youth career
- 1999–2011: Atalanta

Senior career*
| Years | Team | Apps | (Gls) |
| 2011–2019 | Atalanta | 0 | (0) |
| 2011–2012 | → Gubbio (loan) | 23 | (0) |
| 2012–2013 | → Virtus Lanciano (loan) | 29 | (0) |
| 2013–2014 | → Cesena (loan) | 3 | (0) |
| 2014 | → Padova (loan) | 17 | (0) |
| 2014–2015 | → Latina (loan) | 9 | (0) |
| 2015 | → Avellino (loan) | 10 | (0) |
| 2015–2017 | → Ascoli (loan) | 66 | (0) |
| 2017–2018 | → Cremonese (loan) | 25 | (0) |
| 2018–2019 | → Hellas Verona (loan) | 11 | (1) |
| 2019– | Hellas Verona | 0 | (0) |
| 2019–2020 | → Pordenone (loan) | 19 | (0) |
| 2020–2022 | Palermo | 33 | (3) |
| 2022–2023 | SPAL | 10 | (0) |

International career
| 2011–2012 | Italy U19 | 2 | (0) |
| 2012 | Italy U20 | 1 | (0) |
- * Club domestic league appearances and goals as of 19 May 2023

Alberto Almici (born 11 January 1993) is an Italian footballer who plays as a right back.

== Club career ==
=== Early career ===
Born in Bergamo, Almici began his career on hometown's club Atalanta B.C., entering in the youth categories at 6 years old. He played on Primavera club, and in 2010–11 season his abilities impressed.

=== Gubbio (loan) ===
In July 2011, after a successful season with Primavera team, Almici was loaned to newly promoted club A.S. Gubbio 1910

He made his debut for the club on 14 August 2011, in Coppa Italia match against Benevento Calcio, and made his Serie B debut on 27 August, against Grosseto. He finished the season appearing in 23 matches (1492 minutes) with his team eventually being relegated.

=== Virtus Lanciano (loan) ===
In July 2012, Almici was loaned to newly promoted S.S. Virtus Lanciano 1924, alongside Nadir Minotti.

=== Cesena (loan) ===
In July 2013, Almici joined Serie B side Cesena on a loan deal.

=== Padova (loan) ===
On 17 January 2014, Almici was again loaned to Serie B side Padova, after ending a loan spell with Cesena.

=== Later years ===
In September 2020, Almici signed for Serie C club Palermo as a free transfer. He left Palermo in January 2022 to join Serie B club SPAL in a permanent transfer.

== International career ==
Almici was called up to friendlies against Montenegro U19.

== Career statistics ==
=== Club ===
As of 26 May 2021

Appearances and goals by club, season and competition
| Club | Season | League | | | National cup | | Other | | Total | |
| Club | Season | Division | Apps | Goals | Apps | Goals | Apps | Goals | Apps | Goals |
|---|---|---|---|---|---|---|---|---|---|---|
| Gubbio (loan) | 2011–12 | Serie B | 23 | 0 | 3 | 0 | — | | 26 | 0 |
| Lanciano (loan) | 2012–13 | Serie B | 29 | 0 | 1 | 0 | — | | 30 | 0 |
| Cesena (loan) | 2013–14 | Serie B | 3 | 0 | 0 | 0 | — | | 3 | 0 |
| Padova (loan) | 2013–14 | Serie B | 17 | 0 | 0 | 0 | — | | 17 | 0 |
| Latina (loan) | 2014–15 | Serie B | 9 | 0 | 0 | 0 | — | | 9 | 0 |
| Avellino (loan) | 2014–15 | Serie B | 10 | 0 | 0 | 0 | 3 (Note: All appearance(s) in promotion play-offs.) | 0 | 13 | 0 |
| Ascoli (loan) | 2015–16 | Serie B | 31 | 0 | 0 | 0 | — | | 31 | 0 |
| Ascoli (loan) | 2016–17 | Serie B | 35 | 0 | 0 | 0 | — | | 35 | 0 |
| Ascoli (loan) | Total | | 66 | 0 | 0 | 0 | 0 | 0 | 66 | 0 |
| Cremonese (loan) | 2017–18 | Serie B | 25 | 0 | 1 | 0 | — | | 26 | 0 |
| Hellas Verona (loan) | 2018–19 | Serie B | 11 | 1 | 1 | 0 | 0 | 0 | 12 | 1 |
| Pordenone (loan) | 2019–20 | Serie B | 19 | 0 | 0 | 0 | 2 | 0 | 21 | 0 |
| Palermo | 2020–21 | Serie C | 18 | 1 | — | | 1 | 0 | 19 | 1 |
| Palermo | 2021–22 | Serie C | 0 | 0 | 0 | 0 | — | | 0 | 0 |
| Palermo | Total | | 18 | 1 | 0 | 0 | 1 | 0 | 19 | 1 |
| Career total | | | 230 | 2 | 6 | 0 | 6 | 0 | 242 | 2 |
