= Gianluca Sansone =

Italian footballer

Personal information
- Date of birth: 12 May 1987 (age 39)
- Place of birth: Potenza, Italy
- Height: 1.73 m (5 ft 8 in)
- Position: Forward

Team information
- Current team: RG Ticino

Senior career*
| Years | Team | Apps | (Gls) |
| 2005–2006 | Montorio | 30 | (43) |
| 2006–2008 | Valle del Giovenco | 63 | (14) |
| 2008–2010 | Siena | 0 | (0) |
| 2009 | → Gallipoli (loan) | 10 | (0) |
| 2009–2010 | → Lanciano (loan) | 25 | (6) |
| 2010–2011 | Frosinone | 35 | (10) |
| 2011–2012 | Sassuolo | 34 | (19) |
| 2012–2013 | Torino | 14 | (1) |
| 2013–2016 | Sampdoria | 42 | (5) |
| 2015 | → Bologna (loan) | 23 | (7) |
| 2015–2016 | → Bari (loan) | 34 | (6) |
| 2016–2018 | Novara | 62 | (8) |
| 2019 | Neftchi Baku | 11 | (2) |
| 2019–2020 | Audace Cerignola | 19 | (6) |
| 2020–2021 | Casarano | 24 | (6) |
| 2021–2022 | Casertana | 10 | (0) |
| 2022– | RG Ticino | 14 | (4) |
- * Club domestic league appearances and goals as of 3 September 2023

Gianluca Sansone (born 12 May 1987) is an Italian footballer who plays as a forward for Serie D club RG Ticino.

== Career ==
Born in Potenza, Basilicata, and grown in Bella, Basilicata, Sansone started his career with Eccellenza Abruzzo side Montorio, located in Montorio al Vomano. In the next season, he was signed by newly promoted Serie D side Valle del Giovenco and won Serie D Group F champion. Sansone played with VdG in promotion playoffs but eliminated in semi-final/first round.

On 30 June 2008, he transferred to Serie A side Siena, where he signed a 5-year contract. He failed to become a member of first team and left for Lega Pro Prima Divisione club Gallipoli in January.

In July 2009, he remained in Prima Divisione but for Lanciano.

In June 2010, he was sold to fellow Serie B side Frosinone in co-ownership deal, for €400,000, as part of the deal that Siena, the newly relegated team signed Gennaro Troianiello outright, for €2 million. Frosinone also signed the remain 50% registration rights of Caetano Prósperi Calil.

=== Sassuolo ===
In June 2011 Siena bought back Sansone for €800,000, and re-sold to Sassuolo for €425,000 in another co-ownership deal. In June 2012 Sassuolo signed Sansone (€425,000) and Troianiello (€575,000) outright for a total of €1 million.

=== Torino ===
In July 2012 Sansone was signed by Torino F.C. in another co-ownership deal for €1.6 million.

=== Sampdoria ===
In January 2013 Sansone was signed by U.C. Sampdoria from Torino for €1.45 million in a 4 1/2-year contract; Sassuolo retained its own 50% registration rights of Sansone. In June 2013 Sampdoria acquired Sansone outright from Sassuolo for another €1.25 million. Sassuolo also acquired 50% registration of Simone Zaza from Sampdoria for €2.5 million, which another half of Zaza was acquired by Juventus FC from Sampdoria.

=== Bologna (loan) ===
In January 2015 Sampdoria sold forwards Sansone and Manolo Gabbiadini to Bologna and Napoli respectively. Sansone only managed to play 4 games in 2014–15 Serie A.

At Bologna Sansone took no.11 from departing Friberg.

=== Bari (loan) ===
On 15 July 2015 he was signed by Bari.

=== Novara ===
On 13 July 2016 he was signed by Serie B club Novara. He spent 2 1/2 seasons with the Piedmontese club. However, he only played twice in 2018–19 Serie C.

On 31 January 2019, he terminated the contract in a mutual consent.

=== Neftchi ===
On 2 February 2019, he signed with the Azerbaijani club Neftchi Baku under the management of Italian coach Roberto Bordin. On 12 June, Neftchi released Sansone from his contract by mutual consent.

=== Serie D ===
On 11 October 2019 he joined Serie D club Audace Cerignola. On 25 September 2021, he moved to Casertana.

== Honours ==
Pescina Valle del Giovenco

- Serie D: 2006–07

Gallipoli

- Lega Pro Prima Divisione: 2008–09
