= Domenico Di Cecco (footballer) =

Italian footballer (born 1983)

Personal information
- Date of birth: 20 May 1983 (age 43)
- Place of birth: Lanciano, Italy
- Height: 1.77 m (5 ft 9 1/2 in)
- Positions: Right back; central midfielder

Team information
- Current team: Fidelis Andria (assistant coach)

Senior career*
Years	Team	Apps	(Gls)
2002–2006	Chieti	78	(1)
2006–2009	Chievo	0	(0)
2006–2009	→ Avellino (loan)	105	(1)
2009–2016	Virtus Lanciano	184	(11)
2011–2012	→ Barletta (loan)	21	(0)
2016–2017	Catania	37	(1)
2017–2018	Sambenedettese	7	(0)
2018	Francavilla	16	(0)
2018–2020	Audace Cerignola	46	(0)
2020–2021	Bitonto	12	(1)

Managerial career
- 2021–: Fidelis Andria (assistant)
- * Club domestic league appearances and goals

Domenico Di Cecco (born 20 May 1983) is an Italian football coach and a former player who played as a midfielder. He is an assistant coach with Fidelis Andria.

== Biography ==
=== Chieti ===
Born in Lanciano, the Province of Chieti, Di Cecco started his career in the provincial capital.

=== Chievo & Avellino ===
After the club bankrupted in 2006, Italian Serie A team Chievo signed Di Cecco on a free transfer but immediately returned to Italian Serie C1 for Avellino with an option to purchase for €500. In August 2007, Chievo exercised the buy-back option for €20,000 (by selling Carbone and Mengoni) but renewed the temporary deal. Avellino was relegated but re-admitted back to 2008–09 Serie B in the summer of 2008, and renewed Di Cecco's loan.

=== Lanciano ===
In July 2009 Di Cecco was sold back to hometown club Lanciano in co-ownership deal as the contract was running out. On 25 June 2010, Chievo sold the remaining 50% registration rights to Lanciano.

On 30 August 2011 Di Cecco was loaned to Barletta.

=== Catania ===
Catania signed Di Secco on 5 January 2016.
