= Alfredo Cariello =

Italian footballer (born 1979)

Personal information
- Date of birth: 10 September 1979 (age 47)
- Place of birth: Naples, Italy
- Height: 1.77 m (5 ft 9 1/2 in)
- Position: Left midfielder

Senior career*
Years	Team	Apps	(Gls)
1997–2000	Salernitana	1	(0)
1998–1999	→ Nocerina (loan)	7	(0)
1999-2000	→ Campobasso (loan)	18	(4)
2000–2001	Savoia	20	(3)
2001–2002	Taranto	40	(5)
2003–2004	Giulianova	27	(4)
2004–2005	Chievo	0	(0)
2005	→ Frosinone (loan)	19	(2)
2005–2006	Ascoli	22	(2)
2006–2007	Crotone	35	(6)
2007–2011	Frosinone	84	(6)
2011–2012	Turris Neapolis	18	(0)
2012–2013	Pomigliano	7	(0)
2013	Formia		
2013–2014	Argentina		
2014	Ventimiglia		
2014–2015	Carlin's Boys		
2015–2016	Boys Caivanese		
2016–2017	Afro Napoli United		
- * Club domestic league appearances and goals

Alfredo Cariello (born 10 September 1979) is an Italian former footballer.

== Football career ==
Cariello started his career at Salernitana Calcio 1919, one of the largest club in Campania, just behind S.S.C. Napoli. He was loaned to Nocerina and Savoia, also in Campania. He then joined Taranto and Giulianova in January 2003.

=== Chievo ===
He was spotted by Chievo in January 2004, which the club keen on signing players in lower league and loaned out to ensure there was good players in squad when relegated. He was loaned back to Giulianova for the rest of 2003–04 season.

He played for Frosinone Calcio in second half of 2004–05 season, and played his first Serie A season at Ascoli in 2005-06 along with Francesco Carbone, in co-ownership deal with Chievo for €500 and €20,000 respectively. Chievo bought back both players for an undisclosed fee.

On 26 August 2006, he was sold to F.C. Crotone in co-ownership deal, for €50,000 but bought back by Chievo in June 2007 for around €4,000.

=== Frosinone ===
Cariello was sold to Frosinone in another co-ownership bid on 6 July 2007, Chievo also acquired half of the "card" of Gennaro Troianiello as part of the deal. Both players were valued €360,000, thus 50% registration rights "worth" €180,000 each. Cariello picked no.11 as his shirt number. In June 2008 Cariello joined Frosinone outright for another €180,000.

=== Late career ===
In 2011 Cariello left for Lega Pro Seconda Divisione (ex–Serie C2) club Turris Neapolis. In 2012, he left for Serie D club Pomigliano.
