= Filippo Penna =

Italian footballer

Personal information
- Full name: Filippo Penna
- Date of birth: 24 March 1995 (age 31)
- Place of birth: Turin, Italy
- Position: Central defender

Youth career
- –2012: Juventus

Senior career*
Years	Team	Apps	(Gls)
2014–2015	Juventus	0	(0)
2014–2015	→ Den Bosch (loan)	11	(0)
2015–2016	Virtus Lanciano	0	(0)
2015–2016	→ Paganese (loan)	4	(0)
2016–2017	Santarcangelo	0	(0)

International career^{‡}
2010	Italy U-16	3	(0)
2011	Italy U-17	5	(0)
- * Club domestic league appearances and goals as of 13 July 2015 ‡ National team caps and goals as of 20 September 2014

Filippo Penna (born 24 March 1995) is an Italian footballer who plays as a central defender for Santarcangelo.

On 8 July 2015 he was signed by Lanciano along with Marco Di Benedetto, as part of the deal that Mame Baba Thiam moved to Juventus outright in June.
