= Alessandro Volpe =

Italian footballer (born 1983)

Personal information
- Date of birth: 4 January 1983 (age 43)
- Place of birth: Rome, Italy
- Height: 1.73 m (5 ft 8 in)
- Position: Midfielder

Youth career
- Lazio
- 2004–2005: Ternana

Senior career*
Years	Team	Apps	(Gls)
2005–2008	Olbia	96	(22)
2008–2013	Lanciano	102	(13)
2009	→ Olbia (loan)	10	(1)
2009–2010	→ Monopoli (loan)	25	(1)
2013–2015	Salernitana	28	(0)
2015–2016	Lupa Castelli Romani	13	(1)
2016	Lupa Roma	13	(1)
2016–2017	Fiumicino and Fregene		
Total		287	(39)
- * Club domestic league appearances and goals

Alessandro Volpe (born 4 January 1983) is an Italian former footballer who plays as a midfielder.

== Career ==
Born in Rome, capital of Lazio region and Italy, Volpe started his career at S.S. Lazio. In July 2004 Volpe left for Serie B club Ternana. In 2005, he was signed by Olbia. After a season in 2005–06 Serie C2, Volpe was signed by Empoli F.C. but loaned back to Sardinia for 2006–07 Serie C2. In 2007 Olbia re-signed half of the registration rights, and bought outright in June 2008.

Volpe left for Lanciano in mid-2008. After half season in 2008–09 Lega Pro Prima Divisione, Volpe returned to Olbia. On 31 August 2009 Volpe left for Monopoli.

On 14 August 2013 he moved to Lega Pro Prima Divisione club Salernitana in a 2-year contract.

In summer 2015 he was signed by Lupa Castelli Romani. On 4 January 2016 he moved to cross town rival Lupa Roma.
