= Gaetano Vastola =

Italian footballer

Personal information
- Date of birth: May 10, 1978 (age 48)
- Place of birth: Pompei, Italy
- Height: 1.83 m (6 ft 0 in)
- Position: Defender

Team information
- Current team: Racing Fondi
- Number: 17

Senior career*
| Years | Team | Apps | (Gls) |
| 1994–1996 | Scafatese | 54 | (2) |
| 1996–1997 | Giugliano | 20 | (1) |
| 1997–1998 | Narnese | 26 | (1) |
| 1998–2001 | Maceratese | 57 | (2) |
| 2001 | Viterbese | 5 | (1) |
| 2001–2002 | ASD Sant'Anastasia | 21 | (0) |
| 2002–2005 | Avellino | 56 | (3) |
| 2005–2007 | Ascoli | 17 | (0) |
| 2005–2006 | → Salernitana (loan) | 29 | (5) |
| 2007–2009 | Gallipoli | 41 | (4) |
| 2009–2016 | Virtus Lanciano | 182 | (13) |
| 2016–2017 | Racing Roma | 37 | (2) |
| 2017– | Racing Fondi | 2 | (0) |
- * Club domestic league appearances and goals as of 30 August 2016

Gaetano Vastola (born 10 May 1978) is an Italian former footballer who played as defender for S.S. Racing Club Fondi.

== Career ==
In the past, he played with Scafatese, Giugliano, Narnese, Maceratese, Salernitana, Avellino, Ascoli Calcio 1898 and Gallipoli Calcio.
