= Luigi Falcone =

Italian footballer

Personal information
- Date of birth: 26 May 1992 (age 34)
- Place of birth: Mesagne, Italy
- Height: 1.80 m (5 ft 11 in)
- Positions: Forward; midfielder

Team information
- Current team: Casarano
- Number: 7

Youth career
- –2012: Lecce

Senior career*
Years	Team	Apps	(Gls)
2012–2014	Lecce	0	(0)
2012–2013	→ Lanciano (loan)	18	(3)
2013–2014	→ Varese (loan)	10	(2)
2014–2015	Varese	38	(6)
2015–2016	Catania	27	(3)
2016–2017	Reggiana	9	(0)
2017	→ Viterbese (loan)	15	(1)
2017–2018	Catanzaro	31	(5)
2018–2019	Bitonto	19	(0)
2019–2020	Pistoiese	16	(3)
2020–2022	Taranto	35	(4)
2022	Trapani	8	(4)
2022–2023	Fasano	15	(2)
2023–	Casarano	2	(0)

International career
2008–2009	Italy U17	2	(0)
2009–2010	Italy U18	3	(0)
2011	Italy U20	4	(1)
- * Club domestic league appearances and goals as of 17 September 2023

Luigi Falcone (born 26 May 1992) is an Italian footballer who plays for Serie D club Casarano.

== Club career ==
Born in Mesagne, Apulia, Falcone started his career at the Apulia team Lecce. Falcone was a member of the reserve from 2009 to 2012 but already made his reserve debut during the 2007–08 season. Although U.S. Lecce was relegated to Serie B, Falcone also left the club to seek first-team experience, for Serie B newcomer Lanciano. Lecce was later relegated again due to the 2011–12 Italian football scandal.

Falcone made his competitive debut for his new club in 2012–13 Coppa Italia, scoring a goal against Crotone. On 25 August 2012, Falcone played his first Serie B match against Calcio Padova.

On 3 July 2019, he signed with Pistoiese.

On 24 July 2022, Falcone joined Serie D side Trapani.

== International career ==
Falcone received his first call-up in August for a tournament in England. He made his debut in Saarland Under-17 Quadrangular Tournament in September. He did not play any game in qualifying but selected as one of the backup of 2009 UEFA European Under-17 Football Championship, due to the injury of fellow Lecce player Alessandro Scialpi. He was a backup player again in October 2009 for 2009 FIFA U-17 World Cup. Falcone played the last U18 match in the 2009–10 season against Belarus in May 2010. He did not receive any U19 call-up. In August 2011, Falcone was recalled. He received a call-up from Luigi Di Biagio in August 2011 to replace injured Nicolao Dumitru. He played 3 times for Italy in U20 Four Nations, scored once against Switzerland. He also played against Ghana as well as unofficial friendlies against Under-21 "B" and against Serie D representatives. He also received call-up in the new season against Turkey but did not play on 5 September. On 7 September 2012, he was dropped from the squad in favour of players born in 1993.
