= Francesco Carbone =

Italian footballer

Personal information
- Date of birth: 4 January 1980 (age 46)
- Place of birth: Rome, Italy
- Height: 5 ft 9 in (1.75 m)
- Position: Right-back

Youth career
- 1996–1998: Lazio

Senior career*
Years	Team	Apps	(Gls)
1998–1999	Foggia	26	(1)
1999–2007	Chievo	17	(1)
2000–2001	→ Avellino (loan)	23	(1)
2001–2002	→ Pistoiese (loan)	35	(0)
2002–2003	→ Siena (loan)	8	(0)
2003–2004	→ Triestina (loan)	25	(0)
2004–2005	→ Torino (loan)	15	(0)
2005–2006	→ Ascoli (loan)	12	(0)
2006–2007	→ Frosinone (loan)	23	(0)
2007–2009	Avellino	31	(0)
2008–2009	→ Padova (loan)	27	(0)
2009–2010	Foggia	25	(0)
2011–2012	Montichiari	5	(0)

International career
1996	Italy U-17	2	(1)
1997–1998	Italy U-18	8	(0)
- * Club domestic league appearances and goals

Francesco Carbone (born 4 January 1980) is a retired Italian footballer who played as a defender.

== Biography ==
=== Early career ===
Born in Rome, Lazio, Carbone started his career at S.S. Lazio. Carbone then left for Foggia.

=== Chievo and loans ===
In 1999, Carbone was sold to Serie B club Chievo in a co-ownership deal. In June 2000, Chievo purchased the player outright. However Carbone was loaned to Serie C1 club Avellino for the 2000–01 Serie C season. Carbone then spent the 2001–02 Serie B season at Pistoiese. In 2002–03 Serie B, at first he left for Siena in July, then left for Triestina in January 2003. The loan was extended in August 2003. In July 2004, Carbone was loaned to Torino Calcio, who won promotion but were forced to remain in Serie B due to financial difficulties. In July 2005, Carbone was signed by Ascoli for €20,000 along with Alfredo Cariello which the team later admitted to Serie A. Carbone wore the no.13 shirt that season. In his maiden season, Carbone played only 12 games. In June 2006, Chievo bought back both for an undisclosed fee.

In July 2006, Carbone along with Andrea Mengoni were loaned to Serie B club Frosinone. Carbone made his debut on 20 August 2006, in an Italian Cup match, losing to Napoli 1–3. Carbone played as a right midfielder (wing-back) in their 3–4–3 formation. Carbone made 20 starts that season, half of the matches of 2006–07 Serie B.

=== Return to Avellino ===
In August 2007, Carbone and Mengoni were sold to Serie B newcomers Avellino in another co-ownership deal for €10,000 each, with Di Cecco returned to Chievo for €20,000. This time Carbone made 26 starts. In June 2008, Chievo bought back Mengoni again for free and sold Carbone outright for free. As Avellino were relegated, Carbone was loaned to Calcio Padova, also from Lega Pro Prima Divisione on 2 July. However Avellino were later re-admitted to Serie B the following season.

=== Return to Foggia ===
In October 2009, Carbone was re-signed by the third division club Foggia, in a 1+2-year deal. Carbone made 24 starts in 2010–11 Lega Pro Prima Divisione (out of possible 26 matches). Carbone infamously sent off in his club debut, thus missed once (round 10). However, Carbone did not play any game for any club in the 2010–11 season.

=== Montichiari ===
In December 2011, Carbone was signed by Montichiari of Lega Pro Seconda Divisione.

=== International career ===
Carbone had been capped for Italy U-16 (equivalent to current U17) at 1996 UEFA European Under-16 Championship qualification round. The tournament was later renamed the UEFA European Under-17 Championship in 2002. Carbone appeared as a reserve in the Italy U-18 (equivalent to current U19) squad at the 1998 UEFA European Under-18 Championship qualification round. In 2002, the tournament was later renamed the UEFA European Under-19 Championship.

== Honours ==
Siena

- Serie B: 2002–03
