= 1980–81 Serie C1 =

The Serie C1 1980-1981 was the third edition of the rebranded major competition of the present-day Serie C.

== Group A (North) ==
	Classifica	Pt
1.	REGGIANA	46
2.	CREMONESE	46
3.	Fano	44
4.	Triestina	43
5.	Empoli	38
5.	Mantova	38
5.	Treviso	38
8.	Sanremese	37
9.	Forlì	36
10.	Trento	35
11.	Sant'Angelo	33
12.	Modena	32
13.	Parma	30
14.	Piacenza	29
15.	Casale	26
16.	Novara	24
17.	Spezia	19
18.	Prato	18

=== Group B (South) ===
	Classifica	Pt
1.	CAVESE	44
2.	SAMBENEDETTESE	44
3.	Campobasso	43
4.	Reggina	38
5.	Arezzo	36
6.	Nocerina	35
6.	Paganese	35
8.	Benevento	34
8.	Francavilla	34
8.	Rende	34
11.	Ternana	33
14.	Salernitana	32
13.	Giulianova	32
14.	Livorno	32
15.	Cosenza	32
16.	Matera	31
17.	Siracusa	23
18.	Turris	20

== References and sources ==
- Almanacco Illustrato del Calcio - La Storia 1898-2004, Panini Edizioni, Modena, September 2005

Specific
