= Daniele Fruci =

Italian footballer (born 1988)

Personal information
- Date of birth: 6 June 1988 (age 38)
- Place of birth: Rome, Italy
- Height: 1.85 m (6 ft 1 in)
- Position: Defender

Team information
- Current team: Gallipoli
- Number: 6

Senior career*
Years	Team	Apps	(Gls)
2006–2009	Pescara	3	(0)
2009	→ Andria BAT (loan)	7	(0)
2009–2010	Celano	3	(0)
2010–2011	Brindisi	21	(0)
2011–2012	Pescara	0	(0)
2012	Pergocrema	2	(0)
2012–2015	Francavilla		
2015–2016	Pineto		
2016–2017	Renato Curi Angolana		
2017–2018	Chieti		
2018–2020	Brindisi	24	(1)
2020–2022	Martina		
2022–	Gallipoli	2	(0)
- * Club domestic league appearances and goals as of 17 September 2023

Daniele Fruci (born 6 June 1988) is an Italian footballer who plays as a defender for Serie D club Gallipoli.
