= Pasquale De Vita =

Italian footballer

Personal information
- Date of birth: 3 March 1994 (age 32)
- Place of birth: Naples, Italy
- Position: Forward

Team information
- Current team: Gold Coast Knights

Youth career
- Atalanta
- 2012–2013: Verona

Senior career*
| Years | Team | Apps | (Gls) |
| 2013–2015 | Verona | 0 | (0) |
| 2013–2014 | → Pavia (loan) | 13 | (2) |
| 2014–2015 | → Lanciano (loan) | 0 | (0) |
| 2015 | → Monza (loan) | 10 | (0) |
| 2015–2016 | Trapani | 2 | (1) |
| 2016 | → Paganese (loan) | 3 | (0) |
| 2016–2017 | Siracusa | 2 | (0) |
| 2017 | Abano | 7 | (1) |
| 2017–2018 | Ciliverghe di Mazzano | 26 | (5) |
| 2018 | Ciserano | 8 | (0) |
| 2019 | Libertas | 6 | (0) |
| 2020–2021 | SWQ Thunder | 33 | (14) |
| 2022– | Gold Coast Knights | 9 | (4) |

International career
| 2010 | Italy U17 | 3 | (0) |
- * Club domestic league appearances and goals as of 4th July 2022

Pasquale De Vita (born 3 March 1994) is an Italian footballer who plays as a forward for Olympic FC.

== Career ==
=== Atalanta ===
Born in Naples, Campania, De Vita started his career at Lombard club Atalanta.

=== Verona ===
On 17 July 2012, De Vita was signed by Verona in a co-ownership deal, for a peppercorn fee of €500. In June 2013, the co-ownership was renewed. In summer 2013, he was signed by A.C. Pavia. In June 2014, Verona re-acquired De Vita outright.

On 14 August 2014, he was signed by Serie B club Lanciano in a temporary deal. The club also signed Nícolas Andrade and sent Nazareno Battista to opposite direction. On 23 January 2015, De Vita returned to Lega Pro for Monza in a temporary deal.

=== Trapani ===
On 19 August 2015, De Vita signed a one-year contract with Trapani, with an option to extend to further season. On 1 February 2016, he moved to Paganese.

=== Siracusa ===
In summer 2016, he left for Siracusa. However, on 30 January 2017 he left the club.

=== AC Libertas ===
On 23 January 2019, De Vita signed with Sanmarinese club A.C. Libertas.
