= Mohamed Fofana (footballer, born May 1985) =

French footballer

Personal information
- Date of birth: 7 May 1985 (age 41)
- Place of birth: Paris, France
- Height: 1.86 m (6 ft 1 in)
- Position: Forward

Senior career*
Years	Team	Apps	(Gls)
2004–2007	Cittadella	45	(9)
2007–2009	Ravenna	22	(1)
2008–2009	→ Pro Patria (loan)	26	(11)
2009–2010	→ Arezzo (loan)	22	(2)
2010–2011	SPAL	22	(4)
2011–2012	Siracusa	12	(5)
2012–2016	Lanciano	34	(3)
2014	→ Salernitana (loan)	12	(0)
2014–2015	→ Catanzaro (loan)	12	(1)
2015	→ Grosseto (loan)	14	(4)
2016–2017	Lupa Roma	43	(12)
2017–2018	Francavilla	13	(4)
2018	Delta Rovigo	8	(3)
2018–2020	Prato	34	(12)
2021–2022	Stade Beaucairois		
- * Club domestic league appearances and goals as of 23 April 2024

Mohamed Fofana (born 7 May 1985) is a French former footballer who plays as a forward.

His usual position is attacking midfielder and striker.

== Personal life ==
Fofana was born in Paris. He holds French and Malian nationalities.

== Club career ==
He was signed by newly promoted Ravenna on 6 July 2007 in a co-ownership bid. In mid-2009 he was sold to Arezzo in another co-ownership deal but bought back in June 2010. In July 2010 he was sold to SPAL.

After Siracusa was unable to play in 2012–13 professional league, Fofana was signed by Lanciano in a 2-year contract. His contract was later extended.

On 17 January 2014 Fofana was loaned to Salernitana. it was followed by Catanzaro in July 2014 and then Grosseto in January 2015.

On 28 January 2016 he was signed by Lupa Roma from Lanciano for an undisclosed fee. He was re-signed by Lupa Roma on 30 August.
