= Gianvito Plasmati =

Italian footballer

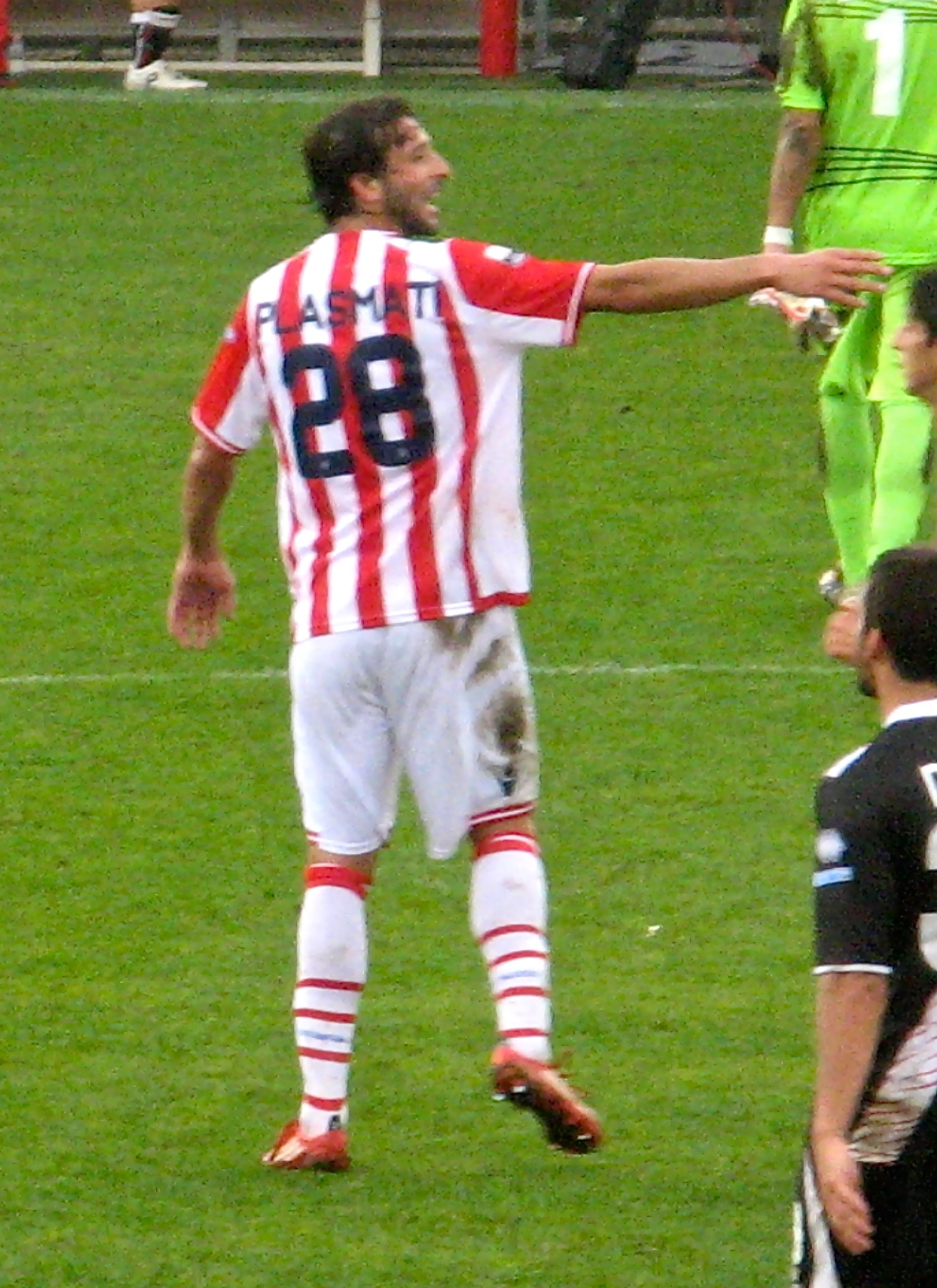

Personal information
- Date of birth: 28 January 1983 (age 43)
- Place of birth: Matera, Italy
- Height: 1.98 m (6 ft 6 in)
- Position: Centre forward

Youth career
- 1999–2000: Ferrandina
- 2000: Matera
- 2000–2001: Virtus Locorotondo

Senior career*
Years	Team	Apps	(Gls)
2001–2003	Chieti	5	(0)
2003–2004	Brindisi	4	(0)
2004–2005	Ragusa	28	(7)
2005–2006	Andria BAT	31	(12)
2006–2007	Catania	1	(0)
2006	→ Crotone (loan)	9	(0)
2007–2008	Foggia	14	(2)
2008	→ Taranto (loan)	13	(7)
2008–2011	Catania	26	(2)
2009	→ Atalanta (loan)	12	(3)
2011–2012	Nocerina	15	(3)
2012	→ Varese (loan)	8	(2)
2012–2013	Vicenza	16	(2)
2013–2014	Lanciano	30	(7)
2014	Siena	18	(3)
2014–2015	Leyton Orient	14	(2)
2016	Catania	16	(3)
2017	Messina	2	(0)
2018–2019	Matera	3	(1)
- * Club domestic league appearances and goals as of 21:31, 3 June 2019 (UTC)

Gianvito Plasmati (born 28 January 1983) is an Italian former professional footballer who played as a striker.

== Club career ==
=== Early career ===
Born in Matera, Plasmati started his career at Ferrandina Calcio in 1999, before moving to fellow Serie D club F.C. Matera in 2000. He then played for Virtus Locorotondo of Serie D from September 2000, until June 2001, when he signed for Calcio Chieti.

=== Chieti ===
In June 2001, Plasmati left for Calcio Chieti of the Italian Serie C1, following several impressive displays in his early years for his prior clubs. The striker made just five appearances for the club between 2001 and 2003. His lack of playing time left the player frustrated and in the summer of 2003, he would switch clubs yet again.

=== Brindisi ===
In July 2003, Plasmati officially signed for Brindisi, a club then competing in the Italian Serie C2. He remained at the club for just one season, after yet another disappointing campaign. The young striker failed to score in just four appearances. He was transfer listed in January, but failed to secure a transfer, before eventually signing for Sicilian club Ragusa in July 2004.

=== Ragusa ===
Plasmati joined the Serie C2 club, and finally secured regular playing time. He spent the season playing as a center forward, and scored seven goals in 27 league appearances. The Sicilian club gave Plasmati his most successful season of his career to this point. Following his impressive form, but the failure of Ragusa, Plasmati transferred back to the mainland with Andria.

=== Andria ===
In August 2005, Plasmati was officially presented as a signing for Andria, a club also in the Serie C2. Plasmati obtained regular playing time for another season and went on to score a fairly impressive 12 goals in 31 league appearances. Following two impressive seasons, back-to-back, the big striker was acquired by newly promoted Serie A side, Calcio Catania.

=== Catania ===
On 7 July 2006, Plasmati was signed by Catania in a joint ownership bid. The club was just promoted to the Italian top flight following a runner-up finish in the Serie B. Plasmati was set to secure his first season in the Serie A, but on 8 August 2006, he was sent out on loan to Serie B club Crotone. The striker did manage his Serie B debut, but failed to make an impact at his new club, making just nine appearances. Following the below-par loan period, He returned to Catania on 31 January 2007. He remained with his club for the remainder of the 2006–07 Serie A season, making his league debut on 7 April 2007, in a game against Roma. This proved to be his only appearance for the duration of the season, as he was behind Giuseppe Mascara, Gionatha Spinesi, Giorgio Corona, Takayuki Morimoto, and Fausto Rossini in the pecking order.

Following a poor debut season in the Serie A, Foggia purchased the remaining share of the striker's contract from Andria BAT. Now in co-ownership between Catania and Foggia, the player went to play for the latter, and made 15 Serie C1 appearances with just two goals. For the second half of the campaign, Catania and Foggia agreed to send the player on loan to Taranto Sport, along with Catania teammate Adriano Mezavilla. With his new club, Plasmati scored an impressive seven goals in just 13 games, and in June 2008, was purchased outright by the Sicilian club.

He was confirmed by Catania head coach Walter Zenga for the 2008–09 season, following the purchase of the remaining share of his contract from Foggia. Plasmati scored his first Serie A goal at San Siro, Milan in a 1–2 loss to the most recent champions Inter Milan. Plasmati's second Serie A goal came against another Italian powerhouse Juventus in a 1–1 draw in Turin. The striker managed 13 appearances during the first portion of the season, but was sent out on loan to Serie A rivals Atalanta for the remainder of the season by Zenga.

=== Atalanta loan ===
On 1 February 2009, Plasmati was loaned to Atalanta, for a cost of €300,000. Following his loan move, the 26-year-old striker scored three additional goals in 12 appearances. Atalanta had the option to buy half of his contract at the end of the season for a sum of €1.5 million, but opted not to, and hence he returned to Calcio Catania in June 2009.

=== Return to Catania ===
Following Atalanta's decision to not buy the player outright, Plasmati returned to Catania and was re-inserted into the first team by new coach Gianluca Atzori. The player managed 13 appearances during the 2009–10 season, partially due to injury. Catania ended the season with a record points total, finishing 12th in the league, following the impressive form under Siniša Mihajlović, that saw Catania lose just four games in six months, following the appointment of the Serbian head coach. The player fell down the pecking order under his new coach behind Maxi Lopez, Giuseppe Mascara, Takayuki Morimoto, and Jorge Andres Martinez during the 2009–10 season, before being excluded from the first team at the start of the 2010–11 campaign due to financial and contractual problems. The player was likely to be either sold or released anyway, due to the presences of several strikers above him in the first team pecking order, including Mascara, Lopez, and Morimoto, along with new arrival Mirco Antenucci, and later Gonzalo Bergessio.

On 19 April 2011, Plasmati joined Celtic for a one-week trial ahead of a possible transfer to the Glasgow club in the summer.

=== Nocerina ===
On 4 August 2011, Plasmati moved to the Serie B club A.S.G. Nocerina on free transfer.

=== Vicenza ===
On 31 August 2012, Plasmati signed to the Serie B club Vicenza Calcio. At Vicenza he was known simply as "The Beast".

=== Siena ===
After his one-year stint at Serie B side Virtus Lanciano, Plasmati moved to league rivals Siena on 22 January 2014.

=== Leyton Orient ===
Plasmati was announced as a Leyton Orient player on 18 October 2014, signing a deal until the end of the season with the possibility of signing a new deal for a further year.

The striker scored his first goal for the club in a 3–2 loss at Gillingham. He netted his second in two games, scoring Orient's opener in a 4–1 win over Crewe. He was released following the club's relegation to League Two.
