= Antonio Aquilanti =

Italian footballer (born 1985)

Personal information
- Date of birth: 8 November 1985 (age 41)
- Place of birth: Lanciano, Italy
- Height: 1.77 m (5 ft 9 1/2 in)
- Position: Defender

Senior career*
| Years | Team | Apps | (Gls) |
| 2003–2004 | Pescara | 20 | (0) |
| 2004–2005 | Fiorentina | 0 | (0) |
| 2005–2007 | Pescara | 41 | (2) |
| 2007–2009 | Ascoli | 27 | (0) |
| 2008–2009 | → Benevento (loan) | 17 | (0) |
| 2009–2010 | Pro Patria | 0 | (0) |
| 2010–2011 | Lanciano | 10 | (0) |
| 2010–2011 | → Pescara (loan) | 0 | (0) |
| 2011 | Cosenza | 12 | (1) |
| 2011–2016 | Lanciano | 165 | (0) |
| 2016–2017 | FeralpiSalò | 33 | (0) |
| 2017–2019 | Sicula Leonzio | 61 | (1) |
| 2019–2020 | Rieti | 23 | (1) |

International career
| 2001 | Italy U-15 | 2 | (0) |
| 2003–2004 | Italy U-19 | 3 | (0) |
| 2004–2005 | Italy U-20 | 5 | (0) |
- * Club domestic league appearances and goals as of 8 March 2020

Antonio Aquilanti (born 8 November 1985) is an Italian footballer.

== Career ==
Aquilanti started his professional career at Pescara Calcio, also in Abruzzo.

He was signed by Fiorentina in co-ownership deal, in summer 2004, played with their Primavera team.

Aquilanti return to Pescara on loan in summer 2005, and Pescara bought back him in June 2006. That month Pescara also bought Andrea De Falco from la viola.

After Pescara relegated to Serie C1, in August 2007, he was signed by Ascoli on a 3-year deal.

In August 2008, he was loaned to Benevento.

In 2009, he joined the Pro Patria and left for Lanciano on 1 February 2010, signed a contract until 30 June 2012.

He left for Cosenza on 31 January 2011.

On 16 August 2019, he signed with Rieti.

== International career ==
He was the member of Italian U-20 team at 2005 FIFA World Youth Championship.
