= Antonio Piccolo =

Italian footballer (born 1988)

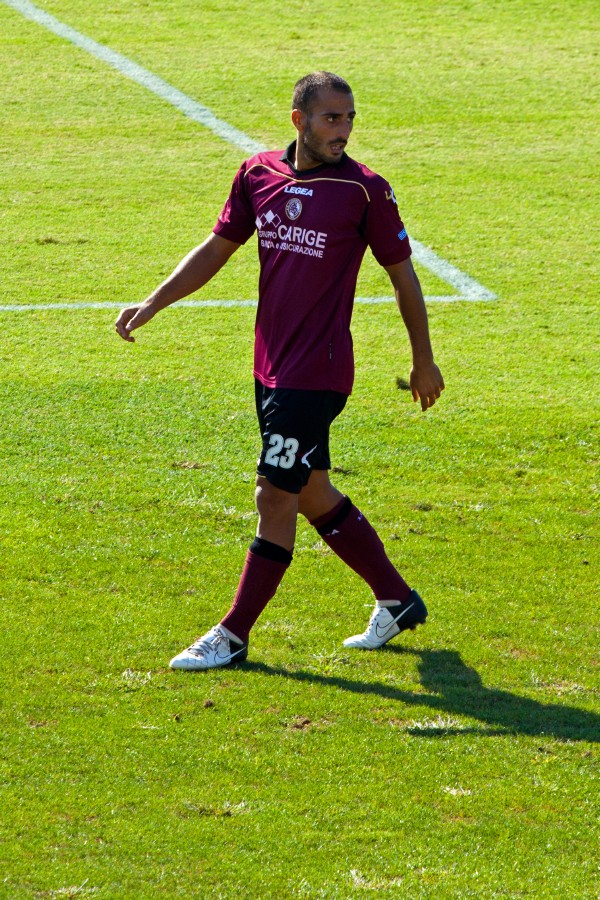
- Antonio Piccolo Livorno's player 2012/2013

Personal information
- Date of birth: 7 April 1988 (age 38)
- Place of birth: Naples, Italy
- Height: 1.80 m (5 ft 11 in)
- Position: Attacking midfielder

Youth career
- Salernitana
- 2005–2008: Piacenza

Senior career*
Years	Team	Apps	(Gls)
2006–2011	Piacenza	41	(5)
2008–2009	→ Foggia (loan)	24	(2)
2011–2013	Livorno	26	(2)
2013–2016	Lanciano	106	(25)
2016–2017	Spezia	53	(5)
2017–2020	Cremonese	70	(15)
2020–2022	Catania	24	(3)

International career
2003	Italy U15	4	(1)
2003–2004	Italy U16	10	(4)
2004	Italy U17	3	(0)
2006	Italy U19	2	(0)
- * Club domestic league appearances and goals as of 3 April 2022

Antonio Piccolo (born 7 April 1988) is an Italian footballer who plays as an attacking midfielder.

== Career ==
Born in Naples, Campania, Piccolo started his career at Campania club Salernitana Sport. After the club went bankrupt in 2005, he was signed by Serie B club Piacenza. Despite his young age, he made his Serie B debut on 8 April 2006 (round 36). He substituted Daniele Degano in added time. In that match, Piacenza won Brescia 3–1. He made his first start in round 40 (3rd round counted from bottom), when he was replaced by Degano in the second half. In that match, Piacenza lost to Triestina 3–4. He wore the no.18 shirt from 2005 to 2008, no.19 in 2009–10 Serie B and no.23 in 2010–11 Serie B.

He was loaned to Lega Pro Prima Divisione club Foggia on 1 September 2008. On 1 July 2009, he returned to Piacenza and made a few substitute appearances. However, he was injured, trained separately and returned to the team in March. Piccolo played his first start of the 2010–11 Serie B season on 16 October 2010, as one of the forwards in a 4–3–2–1 formation, partnering with central forward Daniele Cacia and supportive striker Mattia Graffiedi. In that match, Piacenza defeated Crotone with Piccolo's winning goal.

On 31 August 2011, Piccolo was sold to Livorno for €100,000 in a co-ownership deal; Piacenza got half of the registration rights of Francesco Volpe for a peppercorn of €500. After the bankruptcy of Piacenza, Livorno got the full registration rights. Piccolo left for Lanciano in January 2013. In June 2013, Lanciano acquired Piccolo in a new co-ownership deal.

On 3 October 2020 his contract with Cremonese was terminated by mutual consent. He successively joined Serie C's Catania as a free transfer.

On 9 April 2022, he was released together with all of his Catania teammates following the club's exclusion from Italian football due to its inability to overcome a number of financial issues.
