= Caetano Calil =

Brazilian footballer (born 1984)

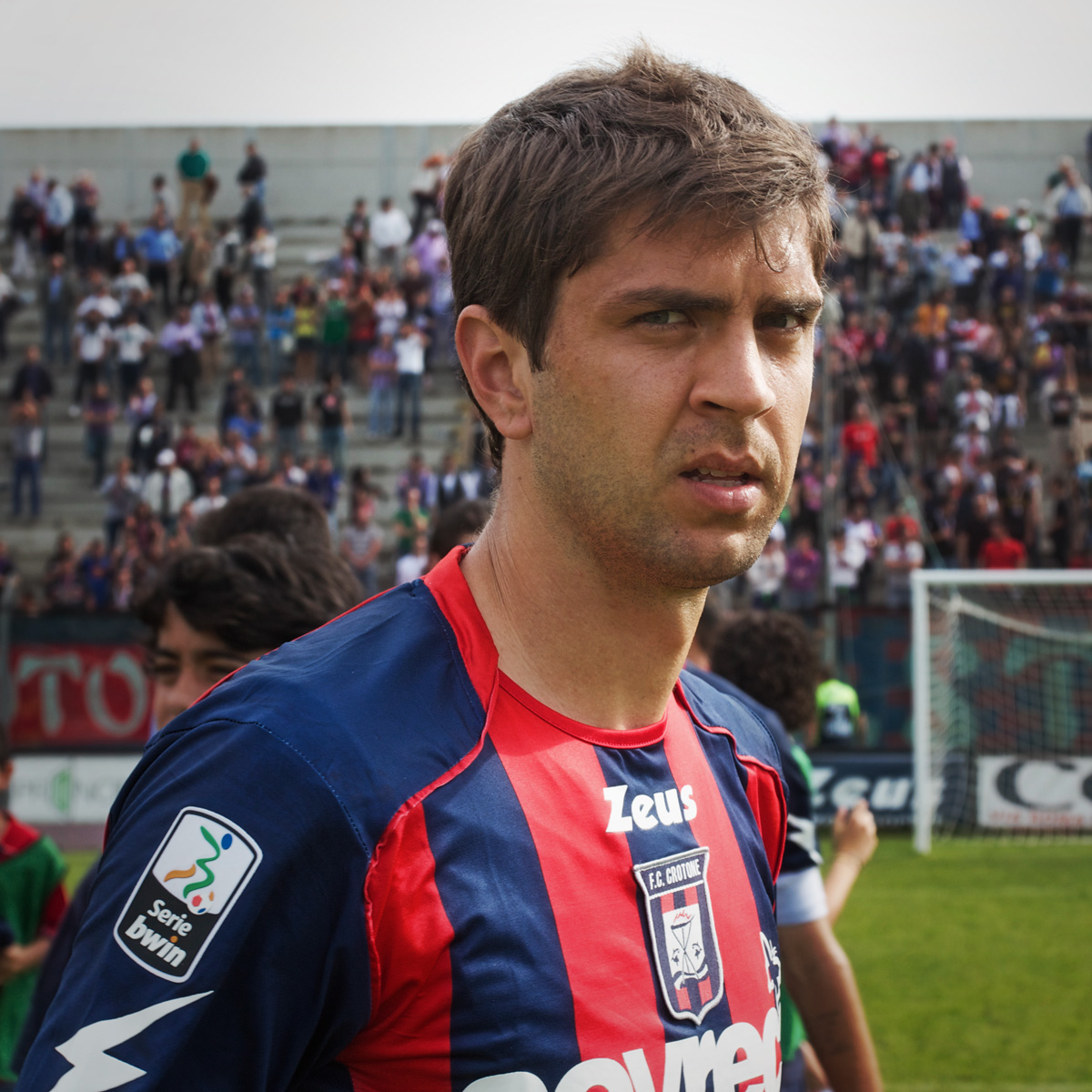

Personal information
- Full name: Caetano Prósperi Calil
- Date of birth: 20 May 1984 (age 42)
- Place of birth: Guaxupé, Brazil
- Height: 1.83 m (6 ft 0 in)
- Positions: Attacking midfielder; forward

Youth career
- 1996–2002: São Paulo
- 2002–2003: Corinthians

Senior career*
Years	Team	Apps	(Gls)
2003–2004	Cruzeiro	0	(0)
2004	Santos	0	(0)
2005	Atlético Paranaense	5	(2)
2005	Roma de Apucarana	12	(8)
2006	Avaí	10	(0)
2007	Ipatinga	0	(0)
2007–2008	Siena	2	(0)
2008–2009	Crotone	22	(7)
2009–2011	Frosinone	40	(4)
2011–2013	Crotone	58	(20)
2013–2014	Varese	23	(12)
2014–2015	Salernitana	35	(16)
2015–2018	Catania	44	(12)
2017	→ Livorno (loan)	15	(1)
2018	Siracusa	8	(0)
2018–2019	Ħamrun Spartans	23	(4)
2019–2020	Paganese	23	(2)

International career
2001	Brazil U17	4	(4)
- * Club domestic league appearances and goals as of 7 March 2020

Caetano Prósperi Calil (born 20 May 1984) is a Brazilian former footballer who played as a midfielder or forward.

== Personal life ==
Calil also holds an Italian passport.

== Career ==
Calil signed a six-month contract with Ipatinga in 2007.

=== Italy ===
He joined Fiorentina on 4 July 2007 as a free agent. However, half of his contractual rights were then sold to A.C. Siena for €350,000. Calil only played twice in 2007–08 Serie A. In June 2008 the co-ownership deal was renewed.

In summer 2008, Crotone acquired half of his registration rights from la Viola for €150,000, Siena retaining the second half.

In June 2009 Siena bought him back from Crotone for €300,000 but resold to Frosinone in co-ownership deal for €450,000. On 24 June 2010, Frosinone acquired Caetano outright for another €450,000, and Gianluca Sansone in co-ownership deal for €400,000, and sold Gennaro Troianiello to Siena for €2 million.

In summer 2011 Calil was re-signed by F.C. Crotone for an undisclosed fee.

In summer 2013 Calil was signed by Serie B club Varese for free.

On 23 August 2014 Calil was signed by Lega Pro club Salernitana in a 2-year contract. The club won promotion to Serie B.

On 31 August 2015 Catania (which relegated from Serie B to Lega Pro due to a match-fixing scandal) signed Caetano, Andrea Russotto and keeper Luca Liverani, with Alberto Frison and Moses Odjer (loan) moved to opposite direction.

On 31 January 2017 Calil, on a temporary basis, moved to Livorno.

On 10 August 2018 he moved to Malta, signing with Ħamrun Spartans.

On 2 September 2019 he returned to Italy, joining Paganese.

== Honours ==
Varese

- Lega Pro: 2015
