= Reggiana =

Reggiana may refer to:

- A.C. Reggiana 1919, a football club
- ASDCF Reggiana, a women's football club
- Pallacanestro Reggiana, a basketball club
- Reggiana cattle, a cattle breed
