= Stadio Guido Biondi =

Coordinates: 42°13′11″N 14°22′56″E

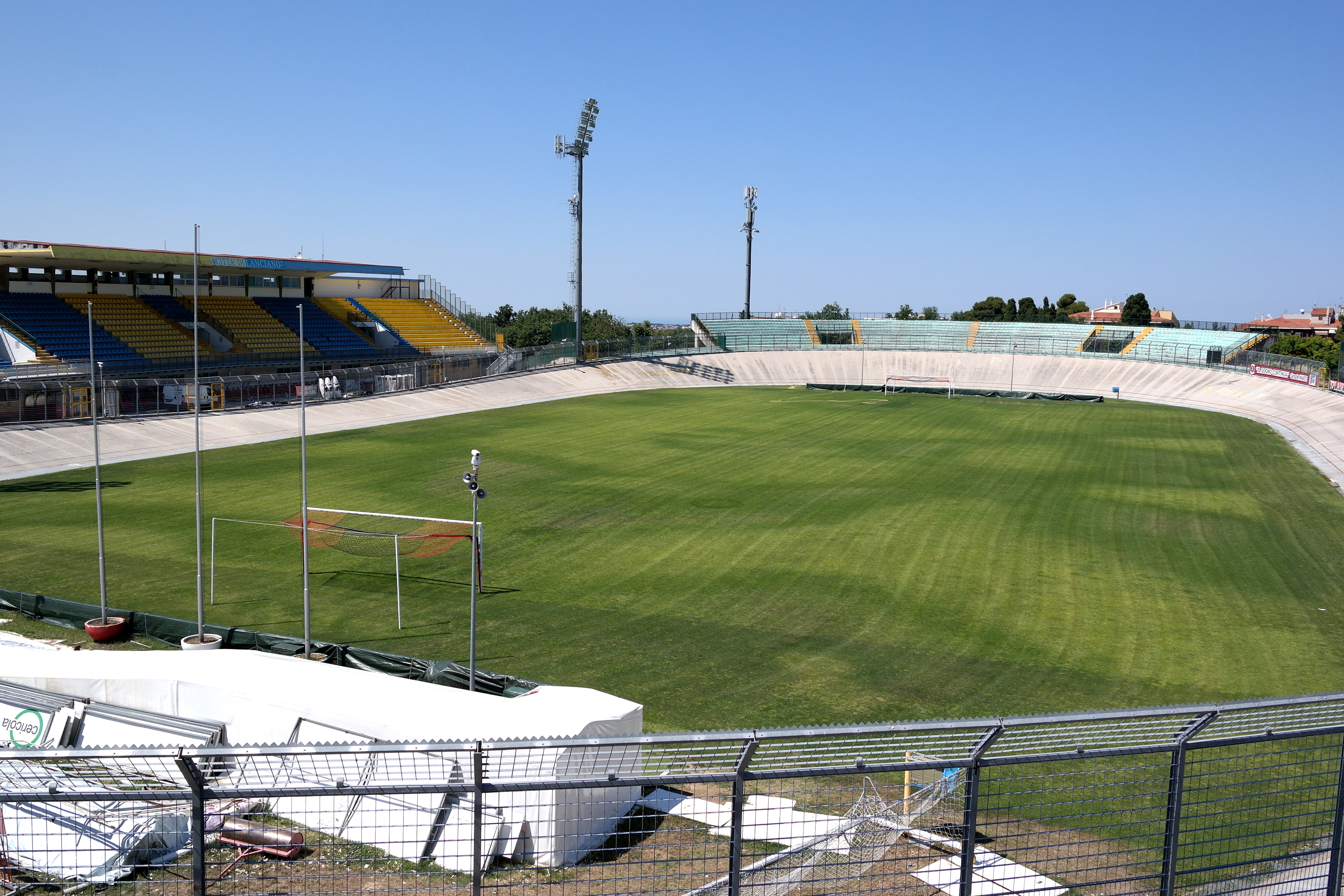
- Interactive map of Stadio Guido Biondi
- Location: Lanciano, Italy
- Owner: Municipality of Lanciano
- Capacity: 5,639
- Surface: Grass

Tenant
- S.S. Virtus Lanciano 1924

Stadio Guido Biondi is a multi-use stadium in Lanciano, Italy. It is currently used mostly for football matches and is the home ground of S.S. Virtus Lanciano 1924. The stadium holds 5,334; about 976 seats are covered.

After the promotion of Virtus Lanciano, it was renovated to meet Serie B standards.

The stadium was named after Guido Biondi.
