= Fabrizio Paghera =

Italian footballer (born 1991)

Personal information
- Date of birth: 12 December 1991 (age 34)
- Place of birth: Brescia, Italy
- Height: 1.85 m (6 ft 1 in)
- Position: Central midfielder

Team information
- Current team: Lumezzane
- Number: 4

Youth career
- Brescia

Senior career*
Years	Team	Apps	(Gls)
2009–2013	Brescia	19	(0)
2010–2011	→ Verona (loan)	14	(0)
2012–2013	→ Virtus Lanciano (loan)	38	(2)
2013–2016	Virtus Lanciano	74	(4)
2016–2018	Avellino	51	(1)
2018	→ Pro Vercelli (loan)	7	(1)
2019–2023	Ternana	103	(5)
2023–2025	Brescia	30	(1)
2025	SPAL	6	(0)
2025–	Lumezzane	31	(0)

International career
2009–2010	Italy U-19	2	(0)
2011	Italy U-21 Serie B	1	(0)
- * Club domestic league appearances and goals as of 29 April 2026

Fabrizio Paghera (born 12 December 1991) is an Italian footballer who plays as a midfielder for Serie C Group A club Lumezzane.

== Club career ==
Paghera made his first team Serie B debut on 24 October 2009 at the age of 17, during a league derby against AlbinoLeffe. Since then, he was regularly featured in the first team by head coach Giuseppe Iachini despite his youth.

He spent the 2010–11 season on loan to Lega Pro Prima Divisione club Verona, but made only thirteen appearances, never playing at all in the promotion playoffs that led his club back to Serie B.

=== Avellino ===
On 6 January 2016, Paghera signed with Avellino.

=== Ternana ===
On 10 January 2019, he signed with Ternana.

=== Return to Brescia ===
On 8 September 2023, Paghera returned to Brescia.

=== SPAL ===
On 31 January 2025, Paghera signed a one-and-a-half-year contract with SPAL.

== International career ==
Praghera has represented Italy at Under-19 level. He capped twice, both were friendlies.
