= Andrea Cristiano =

Italian footballer (born 1984)

Personal information
- Date of birth: 15 July 1984 (age 42)
- Place of birth: Chivasso, Italy
- Height: 1.82 m (6 ft 0 in)
- Position: Winger

Team information
- Current team: Ghivizzano Borgoamozzano

Senior career*
Years	Team	Apps	(Gls)
2002–2004	Pro Vercelli	36	(2)
2004–2013	AlbinoLeffe	135	(12)
2005–2006	→ Novara (loan)	27	(5)
2010–2011	→ Ascoli (loan)	33	(4)
2012	→ Empoli (loan)	12	(0)
2013	Pro Vercelli	17	(3)
2013–2015	Varese	35	(1)
2015–2016	Lupa Roma	21	(2)
2016–	Ghivizzano Borgoamozzano		
- * Club domestic league appearances and goals

Andrea Cristiano (born 15 July 1984) is an Italian footballer who plays for Italian club Ghivizzano Borgoamozzano.

Cristiano extended his contract with AlbinoLeffe to 30 June 2011 in December 2007.

On 31 August 2010 he left for fellow Serie B team Ascoli Calcio 1898. On the same day he renewed his contract until 2014. However, on 22 June 2011 Ascoli decided not to sign him outright.

On 12 August 2013, Cristiano joined Varese on a two-year deal.
