= Salvatore D'Alterio =

Italian footballer

Personal information
- Date of birth: 17 February 1980 (age 46)
- Place of birth: Villaricca, Italy
- Height: 1.83 m (6 ft 0 in)
- Position: Right back

Youth career
- 1997–2000: Casertana

Senior career*
Years	Team	Apps	(Gls)
1996–1997	Casertana	2	(0)
2000–2001	Nocerina	28	(0)
2001–2005	Messina	35	(0)
2003–2004	→ Martina (loan)	28	(0)
2005–2007	Foggia	62	(1)
2007–2008	Taranto	45	(0)
2009–2010	Portogruaro	22	(0)
2010–2011	Pescara	1	(0)
2011	→ Salernitana (loan)	14	(0)
2011–2012	Messina	31	(0)
2012–2016	Casertana	67	(0)
2016	Martina Franca	11	(0)
2016–2017	Casertana	33	(0)
2017–2018	Cavese	27	(1)
2018	Taranto	0	(0)
2018–2020	Sorrento	26	(0)
Total		432	(2)

Managerial career
- 2026–: USD Palmese
- * Club domestic league appearances and goals

Salvatore D'Alterio (born 17 February 1980) is an Italian former perofessional footballer who plays as a right back and head coach for Italian Serie D club USD Palmese.

== Career ==
D'Alterio started his career at Campania team Casertana. He played 2 matches for the team before they were relegated to Serie D. D'Alterio would remain with Casertana for the next three seasons. Then in 2000, he moved to Nocerina in Serie C1. In mid-2001, he was signed by Messina of Serie B on a co-ownership deal. He was not a regular in the team and was after sometime loaned to Martina. In mid-2004 he returned to Messina, now in Serie A, he played 6 league matches.

He spent time at Serie C1 clubs Foggia and Taranto. Although a regular of Taranto, he terminated his contract with the club. He joined Portogruaro and in January 2010 left for Pescara and won promotion to Serie B six months later.

In January 2011 he was loaned to Lega Pro Prima Divisione side Salernitana. He returned to Pescara for pre-season.

In September 2011 he was signed by Serie D club Messina.
