= USD Palmese =

Italian football club

Palmese
- Full name: Unione Sportiva Dilettantistica Palmese
- Founded: 1914 as AS Palmese; 2005; 21 years ago
- Ground: Comunale di Palma Campania, Palma Campania, Italy
- Capacity: 5,500
- Chairman: Ferdinando La Marca
- Manager: Salvatore D'Alterio
- League: Serie D
- 2026–27: Serie D/H, 4th
- Website: https://www.uspalmese1914.it
Home colours	Away colours

U.S.D. Palmese is an Italian association football club, based in Palma Campania, Campania. Currently it plays in Serie D.

== History ==
The first team was founded in 1914, and the present-day club in 2005.

=== Scudetto Dilettanti 2000–01 ===
Palmese in the season 2000–01, from Serie D was promoted to Serie C2, conquering also the Scudetto Dilettanti.

== Honours ==
- Serie D:
  - Winners 1: 2000–01
- Scudetto Dilettanti:
  - Winners 1: 2000–01

== Stadium ==
The club's home stadium is the Stadio Comunale di Palma Campania, which seats 5,500 spectators.
