= Matteo Gentili =

Italian footballer (born 1989)

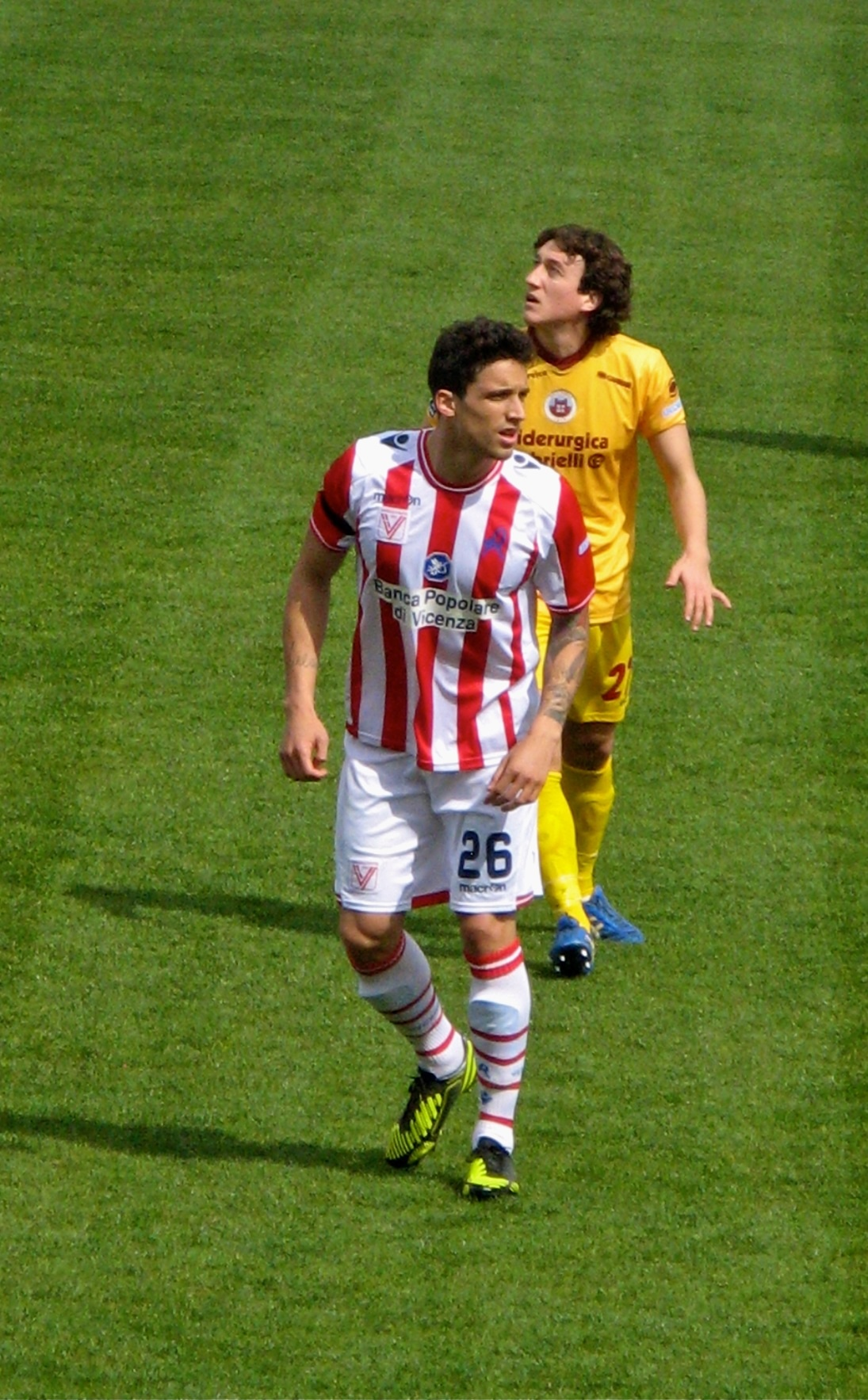
- Gentili with Vicenza in the 2012–13 season

Personal information
- Date of birth: 21 August 1989 (age 37)
- Place of birth: Viareggio, Italy
- Height: 1.88 m (6 ft 2 in)
- Position: Centre back

Youth career
- Margine Coperta
- 2004–2008: Atalanta

Senior career*
Years	Team	Apps	(Gls)
2008–2013	Atalanta	0	(0)
2008–2009	→ Pergocrema (loan)	0	(0)
2009–2010	→ Varese (loan)	15	(0)
2011–2012	→ Spezia (loan)	7	(0)
2012–2013	→ Vicenza (loan)	11	(3)
2013–2014	Reggina	2	(0)
2014–2015	Vicenza	35	(1)
2017	Carrarese	11	(2)
2017–2018	US Real Forte	19	(2)
2019	FC Pecciolese		
2019–2021	Prato	27	(3)

International career
2005–2006	Italy U17	9	(0)
2006–2007	Italy U18	3	(0)
2007–2008	Italy U19	4	(0)
2009	Italy U20	6	(0)
- * Club domestic league appearances and goals as of 21 October 2026

Matteo Gentili (born 21 August 1989) is an Italian footballer who plays as a centre back.

== Career ==
=== Atalanta and loans ===
Born in Viareggio, Tuscany, Gentili was signed by Atalanta BC from Polisportiva Margine Coperta in 2004 in a temporary deal, along with Michele Marconi, Leonardo Manni and Daniele Lonetti. In the next season he was signed definitely from the Massa e Cozzile based side. He was promoted to Atalanta BC's Primavera U19 reserve team in 2006.

In 2008, he left Atalanta for another Lombard club Pergocrema. Gentili made his professional debut in the Italian Cup, However, he failed to play any game in the league nor in the league cup.

In the next season he was transferred to another Lombard club Varese, also in the same level as Pergocrema. He won promotion to Serie B with Varese in June 2010.

Atalanta kept Gentili for 2010–11 Serie B season, however he only played once for the champions.

In July 2011 he left the Serie A club for the third level side Spezia, but had an operation in his right ankle in the same month. Gentili won promotion to Serie B again as one of the group stage winner of the third level. The team also won 2012 Lega Pro Prime Division Supercup, a tournament between the two winners of the two groups of that level. However, he was not feature in the line-up nor on the bench of the matches. Gentili did feature for Spezia in the finals of the league up as an unused bench, which the team was the winner.

On 28 August 2012 he left for Serie B struggler Vicenza which relegated in the last season but re-admitted to Serie B due to the expulsion of Lecce.

=== Reggina ===
On 2 September 2013 Gentili was signed by Serie B club Reggina in a co-ownership deal for a peppercorn fee.

=== Vicenza ===
On 31 January 2014 he left for Vicenza in a 3 1/2-year contract (re-sold from Atalanta in another co-ownership deal for a peppercorn fee of €250). In June 2014 Vicenza acquired the remaining 50% registration rights of Gentili, from Atalanta for free.

In December 2015 Gentili was released by the Veneto club.

=== Carrarese ===
On 14 February 2017 Gentili was signed by Carrarese.

=== FC Pecciolese ===
On 24 January 2019, Gentili officially signed with FC Pecciolese 1936.

== International career ==
He represented Italy at the 2008 UEFA European U19 Football Championship, where they came second, and at the 2009 FIFA U20 World Cup.

== Honours ==
=== Club ===
Atalanta

- Serie B: 2010–11

Spezia

- Lega Pro Prima Divisione Group Stage Winner: 2011–12
- Coppa Italia Lega Pro: 2011–12

Varese

- Lega Pro Prima Divisione Promotion playoffs: 2009–10
