= ASD Francavilla =

Italian football club

A.S.D. Francavilla
- Full name: Associazione Sportiva Dilettantistica Francavilla Calcio 1927
- Founded: 1927
- Ground: Stadio Valle Anzuca, Francavilla al Mare, Italy
- Capacity: 5,000
- Chairman: Fabio De Vincentiis
- Manager: Michele Gelsi
- League: Serie D/F
- 2017–18: 6th
- Website: http://www.francavillacalcio1927.it/
| Home colours | Away colours |

A.S.D. Francavilla, commonly known as Francavilla, is an Italian football club based in Francavilla al Mare, Abruzzo. Currently it plays in Italy's Serie D.

== History ==
The club was founded in 1927 as U.S. Francavilla, and changed its name into S.S. Francavilla in 1946. At the end of the 1970s, after two years in Serie D, the team reached the Serie C1, the third highest football division of Italy.

Francavilla played in C1 (the current Lega Pro) for 7 seasons, from 1980 to 1990. In 1984 it won the Anglo-Italian Cup, during the Semi-professional era, defeating Fisher Athletic and Teramo.

After a decade in professional football, the club was relegated in the regional leagues, such as Eccellenza and Promozione. Starting from the 2001–02 season, the team has always played in Eccellenza Abruzzo.

== Colors and badge ==
The team's main colors are yellow and red.

== Honours ==
Anglo-Italian Cup (semi-professional era)

- Winners (1): 1984

== Former players ==
- (Italy) Sergio Magistrelli (1983–1984)
- (Venezuela) Bruno Nobili (1982–1985)
