= Gennaro Troianiello =

Italian footballer (born 1983)

Personal information
- Date of birth: 21 March 1983 (age 43)
- Place of birth: Naples, Italy
- Height: 1.76 m (5 ft 9 in)
- Position: Right winger

Team information
- Current team: Cremonese (technical coach)

Senior career*
Years	Team	Apps	(Gls)
2001–2003	Calangianus	50	(12)
2003–2004	Ischia	14	(4)
2004–2007	Nuorese	86	(45)
2007–2010	Frosinone	44	(11)
2008	→ Ternana (loan)	2	(0)
2008–2009	→ Foggia (loan)	33	(6)
2010–2012	Siena	28	(2)
2012–2013	Sassuolo	45	(9)
2013–2015	Palermo	15	(0)
2014–2015	→ Bologna (loan)	10	(0)
2015–2017	Salernitana	15	(1)
2016	→ Ternana (loan)	3	(0)
2016–2017	→ Verona (loan)	14	(0)
2017	Sambenedettese	15	(1)
2018	Fano	3	(0)
2018–2019	Nola	31	(0)
2019–2020	Gladiator	15	(0)
2020–2022	Nereto FC 1914		
Total		423	(91)
- * Club domestic league appearances and goals

Gennaro Troianiello (or spells as Troianello; born 21 March 1983) is a Italian former footballer who is currently as a technical coach for Cremonese.

== Career ==
Troianiello started his career at regional league Eccellenza. He then followed Calangianus which was promoted to Serie D. After helping them finish in seventh place, he was signed by Ischia of Eccellenza.

In the summer of 2004, he was signed by Nuorese, where he helped bring the club from Eccellenza to Serie C2 in two years. In the 2006–07 season, Nuorese finished as a losing side of promotion playoffs. In January 2007, he was signed by Frosinone, effective on 1 July.

=== Frosinone ===
On 1 July 2007, Troianiello became a player for Frosinone. On 10 July, Serie A side Chievo also acquired half of the registration rights for €180,000 (paid via the transfer of Alfredo Cariello; Troianiello at first joined Chievo in definitive deal and was sold back to Frosinone in co-ownership). He made only five appearances in his first Serie B season, and was loaned to Ternana of Serie C1 in January 2008.

In the 2008–09 season, he was loaned to Foggia of Lega Pro Prima Divisione (ex-Serie C1). In June 2009, Frosinone bought Troianiello outright for €265,000, and Angelo Antonazzo was bought back by Chievo also for €265,000,

Troianiello scored 11 league goals and started 39 Serie B matches for Frosinone in the 2009–10 season.

=== Siena ===
On 24 June 2010, Frosinone bought his teammate Caetano outright from Siena, and sold Troianiello to Siena for €2 million. As part of the deal, Frosinone also signed Gianluca Sansone from Siena in a co-ownership deal for €400,000. Troianiello signed a 3-year contract.

=== Sassuolo ===
In June 2012, Sassuolo signed Troianiello for €575,000 and 50% registration rights of Sansone for €425,000. In the 2012/13 season, Troianiello scored five goals and managed six assists in 31 appearances as his side were promoted from Serie B.

=== Palermo ===
On 2 July 2013, he was signed by Palermo for free. He was used only sparingly, making 16 appearances in all competitions as Palermo were promoted from Serie B.

=== Bologna ===
Troianiello was loaned out from Palermo to Bologna for the 2014–15 season. He made only 11 appearances as Bologna achieved promotion from Serie B, making it his third successive promotion from Serie B, with three different clubs.

=== Salernitana ===
Troianiello played the first half of the 2015–2016 season with Salernitana.

=== Ternana ===
In January 2016, he was loaned out to Ternana. He made 3 appearances in Serie B.

=== Verona ===
On 31 August 2016, he was signed by Verona.

=== Fano ===
After being released by Sambenedettese, he joined Fano in February.

== Coaching career ==
On 1 July 2022, Troianiello was appointed technical coach at Parma until 30 June 2025.

He left Parma and was appointed technical coach at Cremonese on 2 September 2026 until now.

== Honours ==
Calangianus

- Eccellenza (Group Sardegna) champions: 2002

Nuorese

- Serie D champions: 2006
- Eccellenza (Group Sardegna) champions: 2005
