= Nadir Minotti =

Italian footballer

Personal information
- Date of birth: 16 May 1992 (age 34)
- Place of birth: Bergamo, Italy
- Height: 1.88 m (6 ft 2 in)
- Position: Midfielder

Team information
- Current team: Calcio Valcalepio

Youth career
- 2009–2011: Atalanta

Senior career*
Years	Team	Apps	(Gls)
2011–2017	Atalanta	3	(0)
2012–2014	→ Lanciano (loan)	49	(3)
2014–2015	→ Crotone (loan)	13	(0)
2015	→ Foggia (loan)	14	(1)
2015–2016	→ Como (loan)	10	(0)
2016	→ Siena (loan)	13	(1)
2016	→ Sambenedettese (loan)	0	(0)
2016–2017	→ Pistoiese (loan)	31	(4)
2017–	Calcio Valcalepio		

International career
2010–2011	Italy U-19	9	(1)
2011–2012	Italy U-20	5	(1)
- * Club domestic league appearances and goals as of 10:21, 19 August 2017 (UTC)

Nadir Minotti (born 16 May 1992) is an Italian football midfielder. He plays for Calcio Valcalepio.

== Career ==
Born in Bergamo, Minotti began his career in local side Atalanta's youth categories, in 2009. After spending two full seasons with Primavera team, Minotti was promoted to main squad, and receiving the #88 jersey.

On 20 November 2011, Minotti made his debut for La Dea, in a 2–2 away draw against Siena, after came off the bench to replace Giacomo Bonaventura in 66th minute. Minotti also played 9 games for Primavera team in 2011–12 season.

In July 2012, Minotti was loaned to newly promoted S.S. Virtus Lanciano 1924, alongside Alberto Almici. In 2013 the loan was renewed.

On 11 July 2014 he was signed by another Serie B club F.C. Crotone.

On 15 July 2016 he was signed by Sambenedettese. On 31 August he was signed by Pistoiese.
