= Francesco Signori =

Italian footballer (born 1988)

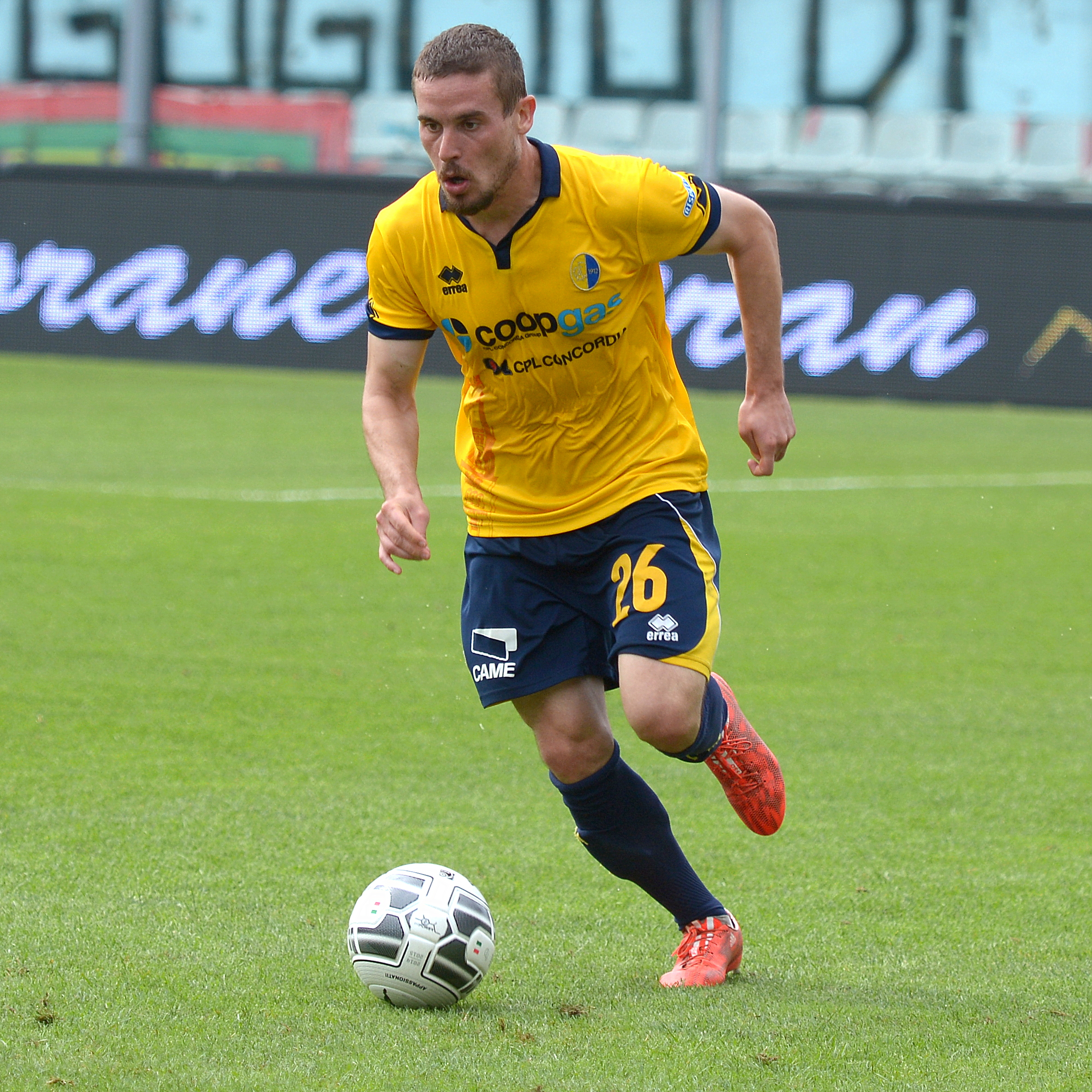
- Signori in 2015 match, Modena vs Ternana

Personal information
- Date of birth: 26 October 1988 (age 38)
- Place of birth: Milan, Italy
- Height: 1.79 m (5 ft 10 in)
- Position: Midfielder

Youth career
- 2000–2006: Montichiari

Senior career*
Years	Team	Apps	(Gls)
2006–2007	Montichiari	8	(0)
2007–2012	Sampdoria	0	(0)
2008–2009	→ Foligno (loan)	21	(3)
2009–2010	→ Vicenza (loan)	25	(0)
2010–2011	→ Modena (loan)	35	(3)
2012–2015	Modena	109	(8)
2015–2016	Novara	14	(0)
2016–2017	Vicenza	55	(4)
2017–2018	Venezia	7	(0)
2018	→ Ternana (loan)	14	(3)
2018–2019	Sambenedettese	35	(2)
- * Club domestic league appearances and goals as of 12 May 2019

Francesco Signori (born 26 October 1988) is an Italian footballer who plays as a midfielder.

== Career ==
Born in Milan, Lombardy, Signori started his career at Lombard club Montichiari.

=== Sampdoria ===
In 2007 Signori was signed by Ligurian club Sampdoria in a temporary deal. He also wore no.55 shirt for the first team.

In summer 2008 he was signed by Sampdoria in a definitive deal for €190,000 in a 4-year contract. In the same transfer window Signori was farmed to Foligno.

=== Vicenza (loan) ===
One day after Signori received his only national team call-up for the under-21 team, On 7 August he was signed by Serie B club Vicenza Calcio in a temporary deal, with an option to purchase. However, Signori did not made his national youth team debut. His contract was renewed to 30 June 2013 during 2009 financial year.

=== Modena (loan) ===
On 16 July 2010 Signori was signed by another Serie B club Modena in a temporary deal. His contract with Sampdoria also renewed to 30 June 2014 during 2010 financial year. Signori returned to Sampdoria at the end of season, which Sampdoria excised the counter-option for €80,000. Signori wore no.88 shirt for Sampdoria in the first half of 2011–12 Serie B. However, Signori returned to Modena again on 3 January 2012 in another temporary deal. On 26 July the temporary deal was renewed. On 19 June 2013 Modena finally purchased half of the registration rights of Signori for €150,000.

=== Modena ===
Signori's contract with Modena effective on 1 July 2013. On 20 June 2014 Sampdoria gave up the remain 50% registration rights of Signori to Modena for free.

=== Novara ===
On 1 July 2015 Signori was signed by Novara.

=== Vicenza ===
On 30 January 2016 Signori left for Vicenza, with Andrea Mantovani moved to opposite direction. Signori signed a 1 1/2-year contract.
