= Giuseppe Pirrone =

Italian footballer

Personal information
- Full name: Giuseppe Pirrone
- Date of birth: 13 May 1986 (age 40)
- Place of birth: Alcamo, Italy
- Height: 1.78 m (5 ft 10 in)
- Position: Midfielder

Team information
- Current team: Messina

Senior career*
Years	Team	Apps	(Gls)
2004–2005	Folgore	25	(1)
2005–2006	Campobello	23	(3)
2006–2007	Ragusa	23	(3)
2007–2010	Manfredonia	73	(2)
2010–2014	Trapani	108	(6)
2014–2016	Ascoli	40	(1)
2016	Pavia	8	(0)
2016–2017	Taranto	13	(0)
2017–2018	Gela	15	(0)
2018	AC Locri	12	(2)
2019–	Messina	8	(0)
- * Club domestic league appearances and goals as of 15:51, 27 May 2019 (UTC)

Giuseppe Pirrone (born 13 May 1986) is an Italian professional footballer who plays for Messina mainly as a midfielder.

== Club career ==
Pirrone kicked off his career with Folgore of the fourth tier in 2004. In the following year, he was transferred to Ragusa. After having a long stint with Manfredonia, he joined Trapani in 2010, making 108 appearances in the process.

In July 2014, Pirrone penned a two-year contract with Ascoli. He scored his first goal against Reggiana.
