= ASD Lanciano Calcio 1920 =

Italian football club

Lanciano
- Full name: A.S.D. Lanciano Calcio 1920
- Nickname: rossoneri (red-black)
- Short name: Lanciano
- Founded: 2016 (renamed from Marcianese)
- League: Eccellenza Abruzzo
- 2019–20: 2nd, Eccellenza Abruzzo
- Website: http://www.lancianocalcio1920.it

A.S.D. Lanciano Calcio 1920 is an Italian association football club. The club was renamed from A.S.D. Marcianese in 2016 as an homage to the first football club of the city, which was founded in 1920. In 2016, also saw the withdrawal of the major club of the city, S.S. Virtus Lanciano 1924, from professional football. That team was a successor of another incorporation of the club, S.S. Lanciano, in 2008.

== History ==
The main football club of Lanciano, has seen a number of re-foundations. In 2008, S.S. Virtus Lanciano 1924 was founded with the club obtaining a permit from the Italian Football Federation (FIGC) to become an official successor to S.S. Lanciano, which was folded in the same year.

However, due to financial problems, Virtus Lanciano also folded their first team in 2016.

In the same year, a smaller club, A.S.D. Marcianese, renamed itself A.S.D. Lanciano Calcio 1920, which claimed to be a ccessor.

The first team of Lanciano 1920 competed in Prima Categoria Abruzzo (Italian 7th highest level) in the 2016–17 season, and won promotion to Promozione Abruzzo, the Italian 6th highest level in April 2018. Lanciano Calcio 1920 were promoted to Eccellenza Abruzzo in 2019.

== Derbies ==
Both Virtus Lanciano and Lanciano 1920 (the latter sometimes just known as Lanciano) still compete in the youth sector as of the 2020–21 season. In the 2017–18 Prima Categoria season, the first team of Lanciano Calcio 1920 also had city derbies with Athletic Lanciano. In the same season, there is the 4th Lanciano club, Lanciano F.C., which played in Terza Categoria, renamed from Guastameroli at the start of that season. Athletic Lanciano also claimed to be a successor of Virtus Lanciano by the form of wearing the jersey of Virtus Lanciano directly, instead of its own "red-black" strip design.
