= SS Virtus Lanciano 1924 =

Italian football club

Lanciano
- Full name: S.S. Virtus Lanciano 1924
- Nickname: Frentani
- Founded: 1920; 1941 (refounded); 1992 (refounded); 2008 (refounded)
- Dissolved: 2016
- Ground: Stadio Guido Biondi, Lanciano, Italy
- Capacity: 5,639
- Website: http://www.virtuslanciano.it/
Home colours	Away colours	Third colours

S.S. Virtus Lanciano 1924 is an Italian association football club, based in Lanciano, Abruzzo. It last played in Serie B in 2015–16 as Virtus Lanciano. Virtus Lanciano now competes in youth football only.

== History ==
The club was founded in 1919 and refounded in 2008 with the name S.S. Virtus Lanciano 1924. That year S.S. Lanciano S.r.l. bankrupted; anew company S.S. Virtus Lanciano 1924 acquired the sports title by using the Article 52 of N.O.I.F.

In the season 2011–12 it was promoted to Serie B for the first time under the guidance of Carmine Gautieri, who also led the team to its debut season in the second tier, and ended in a safe mid-table position.

Virtus Lanciano gained national news in end-2013 after the club, now headed by Marco Baroni, surprised the whole country by leading the league table undefeated, against all odds, by the end of October.

The club ended the 2015–16 season with relegation, and successively renounced to register for the new Lega Pro season due to financial and administrative issues. The first team was excluded altogether from the Italian football league pyramid.

As of 2020–21 season, Virtus Lanciano still runs their youth teams, and have derbies with the illegitimate successor, Lanciano 1920.

== Illegitimate Phoenix club ==
After Virtus Lanciano was withdrew from the Italian football pyramid, another club, A.S.D. Marcianese, renamed itself as A.S.D. Lanciano Calcio 1920. That club claimed as a Phoenix club of Virtus Lanciano.

That club promoted from Prima Categoria to Promozione and then Eccellenza Abruzzo in 2019.

== Colors and badge ==
The team's official colors are red and black.

== Notable former players ==
- (Italy) Alessio Cragno (2016)

== Managers ==
- (Italy) Fabrizio Castori (1998–99), (2000–03)
- (Italy) Maurizio Pellegrino (2004–05)
- (Italy) Francesco Monaco (2005–06)
- (Italy) Andrea Camplone (2006–07)
- (Italy) Francesco Moriero (2007–08)
- (Italy) Eusebio Di Francesco (2008–09)
- (Italy) Dino Pagliari (2009–10)
- (Italy) Andrea Camplone (2010–11)
- (Italy) Carmine Gautieri (2011–13)
- (Italy) Marco Baroni (2013–14)
- (Italy) Roberto D'Aversa (2014–16)
- (Italy) Primo Maragliulo (2016)
