= List of Italian football transfers summer 2010 (August) =

This is the part 2 of list of Italian football transfers for the 2010–11 season.

== Summer transfer window (August) ==
Date	Name	Nationality	Moving from	Moving to	Fee
2010-08-01	Ilario Lamberti	Italy	Bari	Valenzana	Loan
2 August 2010	Sergio Contessa	Italy	Nardò	Novara	Undisclosed
2010-08-02	Marco Petrassi	Italy	Padova	Gela	Loan
2010-08-02	Marco Piccinni	Italy	Bari	Lucchese	Loan
2010-08-02	Michele Sansotta	Italy	Chievo	Sangiovannese	Co-ownership, €500
2010-08-02	Loris Pagnotta	Italy	Prato	AlbinoLeffe	Undisclosed
2010-08-02	Marco Pisano	Italy	Torino	Parma	Undisclosed
2010-08-02	Mohamed Traoré (footballer, born 1991)	Guinea	Parma	South Tyrol	Loan
2010-08-02	Jaime Romero	Spain	Udinese	Bari	Loan
2010-08-02	Samuel Di Carmine	Italy	Fiorentina	Frosinone	Co-ownership, €500
2010-08-02	Adaílton	Brazil	Bologna	(Romania) Vaslui	Free
2010-08-03	Jordan Pedrocchi	Italy	Milan	Chievo	Co-ownership, peppercorn fee
2010-08-03	Paolo Cotroneo	Italy	Padova	Taranto	Free
2010-08-03	Diego Simões	Brazil	Padova	Carpi	Loan
2010-08-03	Andrea Raimondi	Italy	Padova	Juve Stabia	Loan
3 August 2010	Salvatore D'Elia	Italy	Juventus	Portogruaro	Loan, Free
3 August 2010	Andrea Pisani	Italy	Juventus	Portogruaro	Loan, Free
2010-08-03	Enrico Cotza	Italy	Cagliari	Villacidrese	Co-ownership, Undisclosed
2010-08-03	Miguel Veloso	Portugal	(Portugal) Sporting	Genoa	€9M + Bonus
2010-08-03	Alberto Zapater	Spain	Genoa	(Portugal) Sporting	€2M
4 August 2010	Pasquale Maiorino	Italy	Vicenza	Brindisi	Co-ownership, €500
2010-08-04	Rafinha	Brazil	(Germany) Schalke 04	Genoa	Undisclosed
2010-08-04	Lorenzo Insigne	Italy	Napoli	Foggia	Co-ownership, €500
2010-08-04	Ahmed Guilouzi	Tunisia	Modena	Carpi	Loan
2010-08-04	Ignacio Piatti	Argentina	(Argentina) Independiente	Lecce	Undisclosed
2010-08-04	Steve von Bergen	Switzerland	(Germany) Hertha BSC	Cesena	Free
2010-08-04	Davide Moscardelli	Italy	Piacenza	Chievo	Undisclosed
2010-08-04	Alessandro Sbaffo	Italy	Chievo	Piacenza	Loan
2010-08-04	Mattia Marchi	Italy	Rimini	Chievo	Free
2010-08-04	Mattia Marchi	Italy	Chievo	South Tyrol	Co-ownership, €500
2010-08-04	Daniel Semenzato	Italy	Frosinone	Cittadella	Undisclosed
2010-08-04	Luca Cigarini	Italy	Napoli	(Spain) Sevilla	Loan
4 August 2010	Ezequiel Muñoz	Argentina	(Argentina) Boca Juniors	Palermo	US$7,530,000
2010-08-04	Piergiuseppe Maritato	Italy	Fiorentina	Reggiana	Loan
5 August 2010	Giuseppe Giovinco	Italy	Juventus (youth)	Carrarese	Co-ownership, Undisclosed
2010-08-05	Cristian Galano	Italy	Bari	Gubbio	Loan
2010-08-05	Alessandro Longhi	Italy	FeralpiSalò	Triestina	Undisclosed
2010-08-05	Sebastian Giovinco	Italy	Juventus	Parma	Loan, €1M
2010-08-05	Joaquín Larrivey	Argentina	Cagliari	(Argentina) Colón	Loan
2010-08-05	Roberto Guana	Italy	Palermo	Chievo	Loan
2010-08-05	Pierre Regonesi	Italy	Rimini	AlbinoLeffe	Free
2010-08-05	Roberto Cortese	Italy	Chievo	Foggia	Loan
2010-08-05	Gaetano Carrieri	Italy	Manfredonia	Torino	Free
2010-08-05	Attila Filkor	Hungary	Milan	Triestina	Loan
2010-08-06	Simone Farelli	Italy	Crotone	Siena	Undisclosed
2010-08-06	Riccardo Zampagna	Italy	Sassuolo	Carrarese	
2010-08-06	Amedeo Calliari	Italy	Chievo	Lumezzane	Loan
2010-08-06	Thiam Silmon Gueye	Senegal	Catania (youth)	Lumezzane	Free
6 August 2010	Thierry Audel	France	Triestina	Pisa	Free
2010-08-06	Stefano Guberti	Italy	Roma	Sampdoria	Co-ownership, €1.5M
2010-08-06	Alessandro Gherardi	Italy	Pergocrema	Triestina	Undisclosed
2010-08-06	Fabio Lebran	Italy	Parma	AlbinoLeffe	Co-ownership, €0.15M
2010-08-06	Nicolás Bertolo	Argentina	Palermo	(Spain) Zaragoza	Loan
2010-08-06	Javier Garrido	Spain	(England) Manchester City	Lazio	Undisclosed
2010-08-07	Mohammed Rabiu	Ghana	Udinese	(France) Évian Thonon Gaillard	Loan
2010-08-07	Christian Conti	Italy	Bari	Como	Loan
2010-08-07	Giordano Maccarone	Italy	Catania (youth)	Milazzo	Loan
2010-08-07	Alessio Sestu	Italy	Vicenza	Siena	Co-ownership, €0.525M
2010-08-08	Corrado Colombo	Italy	Verona	Spezia	Free
2010-08-08	Lucas Longoni	Argentina	Arezzo	Triestina	Free
2010-08-08	Michael Perrier	Switzerland	Genoa	(Switzerland) Chiasso	Loan
2010-08-08	Digão	Brazil	Milan	(Portugal) Penafiel	Loan
2010-08-08	Piero Robertiello	Italy	Salernitana	Chievo	Undisclosed
2010-08-08	Piero Robertiello	Italy	Chievo	Giulianova	?
2010-08-08	Nicola Bellomo	Italy	Bari	Barletta	Loan
2010-08-08	Panagiotis Tachtsidis	Greece	Genoa	Cesena	Loan
2010-08-08	Stephen Appiah	Ghana	Bologna	Cesena	Free
2010-08-09	Morris Donati	Italy	Sampdoria	Carrarese	Undisclosed
2010-08-09	Nicolò Buono	Italy	Sampdoria	Carrarese	Co-ownership, Undisclosed
2010-08-09	Alessandro Bastrini	Italy	Sampdoria	Vicenza	Co-ownership, Undisclosed
2010-08-09	Sergio Viotti	Italy	Brescia	Triestina	Co-ownership, €50,000
2010-08-09	György Garics	Austria	Atalanta	Bologna	€3M
2010-08-09	Cristian Raimondi	Italy	Livorno	Atalanta	Undisclosed
2010-08-09	Gabriele Perico	Italy	AlbinoLeffe	Cagliari	Loan, €375,000
2010-08-09	Simon Laner	Italy	AlbinoLeffe	Cagliari	Loan, €375,000
2010-08-09	Angelo Corsi	Italy	Pescara	SPAL	Loan
2010-08-10	Salvatore Bruno	Italy	Modena	Sassuolo	Free
2010-08-10	Leonardo Moracci	Italy	Chievo	Lecco	Free
2010-08-10	Riccardo Durandi	Italy	Triestina	Lecco	Loan
10 August 2010	Giuseppe Pugliese	Italy	Verona	Varese	Loan
2010-08-10	Filippo Maria Scardina	Italy	Roma	Como	Loan
2010-08-10	Simone Colombi	Italy	Atalanta	Alessandria	Loan
2010-08-10	Armando Visconti	Italy	Bari	Campobasso	Loan
2010-08-10	Jacopo Fanucchi	Italy	Figline	Empoli	Free
2010-08-10	Alessandro Bassoli	Italy	Bologna	Foligno	Loan
2010-08-10	Gaetano Caridi	Italy	Mantova	Grosseto	Free
2010-08-10	Filippo Lombardi	Italy	Ancona	Bologna	Free
2010-08-10	Guillermo Burdisso	Argentina	(Argentina) Rosario Central	Roma	Loan, €500K
2010-08-10	Luigi Cuomo	Italy	Pescara	Paganese	Free
10 August 2010	Riccardo Maniero	Italy	Juventus	Pescara	Co-ownership, €450,000 (€150,000+ 50% Del Papa)
10 August 2010	Raffaele Alcibiade	Italy	Juventus	Pescara	Loan
10 August 2010	Luca Del Papa	Italy	Pescara (youth)	Juventus (youth)	Co-ownership, €300,000 (part of Maniero)
11 August 2010	Sergio Contessa	Italy	Novara	Melfi	Loan
2010-08-11	Ugo Gabrieli	Italy	Lecce	Paganese	Loan
2010-08-11	Panagiotis Kone	Greece	(Greece) Iraklis	Brescia	Undisclosed
2010-08-11	Matteo Paro	Italy	Genoa	Vicenza	Loan
2010-08-11	Antonino Ragusa	Italy	Genoa	Salernitana	Loan
2010-08-11	Kelwin Ewome Matute	Cameroon	Udinese	Triestina	Loan
2010-08-11	Dimitris Moulazimis	Cyprus	(Cyprus) Enosis Neon Paralimni	Ascoli	Loan
2010-08-11	Roberto Guitto	Italy	Empoli (youth)	Ravenna	Co-ownership
2010-08-11	Salvatore Caturano	Italy	Empoli	Ravenna	Co-ownership
2010-08-12	Eros Schiavon	Italy	SPAL	Portogruaro	Undisclosed
2010-08-12	Domenico Aliperta	Italy	Bari	Gela	
2010-08-12	Lorenzo Prisco	Italy	Pescara	Brindisi	Loan
2010-08-12	Antonio Mottola	Italy	Pescara	Brindisi	Undisclosed
2010-08-12	Daniele Fruci	Italy	Pescara	Brindisi	Loan
2010-08-12	Attilio Angotti	Italy	Pescara	Brindisi	Undisclosed
2010-08-12	Samon Reider Rodríguez	Cuba	Juventus	Pergocrema	Co-ownership, Undisclosed
2010-08-12	Allan Nyom	France	Udinese	(Spain) Granada	Loan
2010-08-12	Christian Poulsen	Denmark	Juventus	(England) Liverpool	€5.475M + Bonus up to €1.2M
2010-08-12	Andrea Cocco	Italy	Cagliari	AlbinoLeffe	Co-ownership, €50,000
2010-08-12	Marco Mancosu	Italy	Cagliari	Siracusa	Co-ownership, Undisclosed
2010-08-12	Diego Ângelo	Brazil	Genoa	(Turkey) Eskişehirspor	Loan
2010-08-12	Manuel Gavilan	Spain	(Spain) Betis	Bologna	Undisclosed
2010-08-12	Gabriele Cioffi	Italy	AlbinoLeffe	Carpi	Free
2010-08-12	Matteo Di Piazza	Italy	Rimini	Chievo	Free
2010-08-13	Matteo Di Piazza	Italy	Chievo	Pro Vercelli	Co-ownership, €500
2010-08-13	Alessandro Lorusso	Italy	Carpi	Sampdoria	Undisclosed
2010-08-13	Vinicius	Brazil	(Brazil) São José de Porto Alegre	Parma	Loan
2010-08-13	Albin Ekdal	Sweden	Juventus	Bologna	Co-ownership, €2.4M
2010-08-13	Hernanes	Brazil	(Brazil) São Paulo	Lazio	Undisclosed
2010-08-13	Mario Balotelli	Italy	Internazionale	(England) Manchester City	€22.6M
2010-08-14	Kevin-Prince Boateng	Ghana	(England) Portsmouth	Genoa	Undisclosed
2010-08-15	Antonio Croce	Italy	Padova	Villacidrese	Free
15 August 2010	Stefano Baraldo	Italy	Piacenza (youth)	Barletta	Loan
2010-08-16	Robson Toledo	Brazil	Ravenna	Triestina	Loan
2010-08-16	Francesco Lunardini	Italy	Parma	Triestina	Loan
2010-08-16	Tiago	Portugal	Juventus	(Spain) Atlético Madrid	Loan
2010-08-16	Angelo Antonazzo	Italy	Chievo	Taranto	Undisclosed
2010-08-16	Angelo Bencivenga	Italy	Udinese	Livorno	Undisclosed
2010-08-17	Giacomo Bassoli	Italy	Bologna	Sanremese	Loan, €14,500
2010-08-17	Vinicius	Brazil	(Brazil) São José de Porto Alegre	Lanciano	Loan
2010-08-17	Marco Pomante	Italy	Pescara	Nocerina	Loan
2010-08-17	Gianluca Rolandone	Italy	Pro Vercelli	Ascoli	Free
2010-08-17	Germán Denis	Argentina	Napoli	Udinese	Undisclosed
2010-08-17	Cesare Rickler	Italy	Chievo	Piacenza	Loan
2010-08-17	Manuel Iori	Italy	Chievo	Livorno	Loan
2010-08-17	Giuseppe Caccavallo	Italy	Lecce	Barletta	Loan
2010-08-17	Matteo Guardalben	Italy	Sampdoria	Modena	Free
2010-08-17	Ricardo Villar	Argentina	Udinese	Triestina	Co-ownership, Undisclosed
2010-08-17	Thomas Job	Cameroon	Grosseto	Cittadella	Undisclosed
17 August 1010	Dario Venitucci	Italy	Juventus	Bassano	Co-ownership, Undisclosed
2010-08-18	Daniel Cappelletti	Italy	Palermo (youth)	Padova	Loan
18 August 2010	Davide Succi	Italy	Palermo	Padova	Loan, Free
18 August 2010	Nicola Maniero	Italy	Padova (youth)	Palermo (youth)	Loan, €250,000
2010-08-18	Alessandro Malomo	Italy	Roma (youth)	Verona	Loan
2010-08-18	Roberto D'Aversa	Italy	Triestina	Lanciano	Free
2010-08-18	Ricardo Villar	Argentina	Triestina	Como	Loan
2010-08-18	Massimo Gobbi	Italy	Fiorentina	Parma	Free
2010-08-18	Danilo Pereira	Portugal	(Portugal) Benfica	Parma	Undisclosed
2010-08-18	Kevin-Prince Boateng	Ghana	Genoa	Milan	Co-ownership, €5.25M
2010-08-18	Robert Acquafresca	Italy	Genoa	Cagliari	Loan, €2M
2010-08-18	Gianluca Litteri	Italy	Internazionale	Salernitana	Loan
2010-08-18	Bogdan Pătraşcu	Romania	Padova	(Romania) Sportul Studenţesc	Free
19 August 2010	Marco Duravia	Italy	Juventus	Canavese	Co-ownership, Undisclosed
19 August 2010	Gianmarco Piccioni	Italy	Vicenza	L'Aquila	Free
2010-08-19	Nikolas Kras	Italy	Reggina	Viareggio	Loan
2010-08-19	Carlo Camilli	Italy	Ascoli	Pescara	Free
2010-08-19	Crescenzo Liccardo	Italy	Napoli	Paganese	?
2010-08-19	Luca Giannone	Italy	Napoli	Matera	
2010-08-19	Fabrizio Lo Sicco	Italy	Empoli	Matera	
2010-08-19	Alessandro Sgrigna	Italy	Vicenza	Torino	€1.32M
2010-08-19	Elvis Abbruscato	Italy	Torino	Vicenza	€1.2M
2010-08-19	Luca Tedeschi	Italy	Parma	Crotone	Loan
2010-08-19	Luciano Zauri	Italy	Lazio	Sampdoria	Loan
2010-08-19	Francesco Di Tacchio	Italy	Fiorentina	Frosinone	Co-ownership, Undisclosed
2010-08-19	Gianluigi Bianco	Italy	Sampdoria	Sassuolo	Loan
2010-08-19	Paolo Castelli	Italy	Crotone	Como	Free
2010-08-20	Ayub Daud	Somalia	Juventus	Cosenza	Loan
2010-08-20	Roberto Colombo	Italy	Bologna	Triestina	Free
2010-08-20	Matteo Rubin	Italy	Torino	Bologna	Loan
2010-08-20	Marco Bernacci	Italy	Bologna	Torino	Loan
2010-08-20	Luciano Zavagno	Argentina	Ancona	Torino	Free
2010-08-20	Lorenzo Morelli	Italy	Fiorentina	Prato	Co-ownership, €500
2010-08-20	Éder	Brazil	Empoli	Brescia	Undisclosed
2010-08-20	Paolo Hernán Dellafiore	Italy	Palermo	Parma	Loan
2010-08-20	Mohamed Coly	Senegal	Rodengo Saiano	Varese	Loan
20 August 2010	Davide Marchini	Italy	Livorno	Spezia	Undisclosed
2010-08-21	Miloš Krasić	Serbia	(Russia) CSKA Moscow	Juventus	€15M
2010-08-21	Cristiano Lucarelli	Italy	Parma	Napoli	Loan
2010-08-23	Diego Cavalieri	Brazil	(England) Liverpool	Cesena	Undisclosed
2010-08-23	Javier Chevantón	Uruguay	(Spain) Sevilla	Lecce	Free
2010-08-23	Guilherme do Prado	Brazil	Cesena	(England) Southampton	Loan (until January)
2010-08-23	Giacomo Beretta	Italy	Milan	Genoa	Co-ownership, €4M
2010-08-23	Giacomo Beretta	Italy	Genoa	Milan	Loan
2010-08-23	Andrea Adamo	Italy	Palermo (youth)	Reggiana	Loan
2010-08-24	Enrico Verachi	Italy	Cagliari	San Marino	Co-ownership, Undisclosed
2010-08-24	Ricardo Faty	Senegal	Roma	(Greece) Aris	Undisclosed
2010-08-24	Marco Andreolli	Italy	Roma	Chievo	€800K
2010-08-24	Cyril Thereau	France	(Belgium) Charleroi	Chievo	Undisclosed
2010-08-24	Alessandro Diamanti	Italy	(England) West Ham United	Brescia	€2.2M + €0.3M bonus
2010-08-24	Valerio Frasca	Italy	Roma	Villacidrese	Loan
2010-08-24	Maikol Negro	Italy	Valle del Giovenco	Catania	Free
2010-08-24	Maikol Negro	Italy	Catania	Nocerina	Co-ownership, Undisclosed
2010-08-24	Andrea Ferrato	Italy	Gubbio	Triestina	Undisclosed
2010-08-25	Jefferson Trazzi	Brazil	Chievo	Triestina	Undisclosed
2010-08-25	Alberto Aquilani	Italy	(England) Liverpool	Juventus	Loan
2010-08-25	Marcelo Zalayeta	Uruguay	Napoli	(Turkey) Kayserispor	Undisclosed
2010-08-25	Marcus Diniz	Brazil	Milan	(Belgium) Eupen	Loan
2010-08-25	Paolo Castellini	Italy	Parma	Roma	Loan
2010-08-25	Ferdinando Sforzini	Italy	Udinese	(Romania) CFR Cluj	Loan
2010-08-25	Gastón Ramírez	Uruguay	(Uruguay) Peñarol	Bologna	Undisclosed
2010-08-25	Mouhamed Abdoulaye Tine	Ghana	Udinese	Bologna	Undisclosed
2010-08-25	Dominic Adiyiah	Ghana	Milan	Reggina	Loan
2010-08-25	Simone Iacoponi	Italy	Empoli	Foligno	Co-ownership, Undisclosed
2010-08-25	Simone D'Anna	Italy	Fiorentina	Gela	Co-ownership, Undisclosed
2010-08-26	Andrea La Mantia	Italy	Frosinone	Foligno	Loan
2010-08-26	Loris Lorini	Italy	Frosinone	Matera	Co-ownership, Undisclosed
2010-08-26	Renato Dossena	Italy	Empoli	Barletta	Co-ownership, Undisclosed
2010-08-26	Ivan Pelizzoli	Italy	(Russia) Lokomotiv Moscow	Cagliari	Undisclosed
2010-08-26	Alessio Cerci	Italy	Roma	Fiorentina	€4M
2010-08-26	Bruno Montelongo	Uruguay	(Uruguay) River Plate de Montevideo	Milan	Loan
2010-08-26	Daniele De Vezze	Italy	Bari	Torino	Undisclosed
2010-08-27	Carlos Carmona	Chile	Reggina	Atalanta	Co-ownership, Undisclosed
2010-08-27	Alessandro Pellicori	Italy	(England) Queens Park Rangers	Torino	Loan
2010-08-27	Fabio Quagliarella	Italy	Napoli	Juventus	Loan, €4.5M
2010-08-27	Diego	Brazil	Juventus	(Germany) Wolfsburg	€15.5M
2010-08-27	Victor Obinna	Nigeria	Internazionale	(England) West Ham United	Loan
2010-08-27	Mattia Morandi	Italy	Novara	Como	Loan
2010-08-27	Frederik Sørensen	Denmark	(Denmark) Lyngby	Juventus	Loan
2010-08-27	Iván Amaya	Spain	Udinese	(Spain) Murcia	?
2010-08-28	Francesco Dettori	Italy	Pescara	Chievo	Co-ownership, €50,000 (part of Ariatti)
2010-08-28	Roberto Inglese	Italy	Pescara	Chievo	Co-ownership, €600,000 (part of Ariatti)
2010-08-28	Luca Ariatti	Italy	Chievo	Pescara	€650,000 (Dettori + Inglese)
2010-08-28	Marco Malagò	Italy	Chievo	Triestina	Loan
2010-08-28	Nicolas Burdisso	Argentina	Internazionale	Roma	€8M
2010-08-28	Pablo Armero	Colombia	(Brazil) Palmeiras	Udinese	Undisclosed
28 August 2010	Armin Bačinović	Slovenia	(Slovenia) Maribor	Palermo	€1.2M
28 August 2010	Josip Iličić	Slovenia	(Slovenia) Maribor	Palermo	€1.8M
2010-08-28	Abderrazzak Jadid	Morocco	Salernitana	Parma	Undisclosed
29 August 2010	Vincenzo Camilleri	Italy	Reggina	Juventus (youth)	Loan
2010-08-29	Zlatan Ibrahimović	Sweden	(Spain) Barcelona	Milan	Loan
2010-08-29	Mauro Vigorito	Italy	Cagliari	Carrarese	Loan
2010-08-29	Salvatore Bocchetti	Italy	Genoa	(Russia) Rubin Kazan	Undisclosed
2010-08-30	José Sosa	Argentina	(Germany) Bayern Munich	Napoli	Undisclosed
30 August 2010	David Trézéguet	France	Juventus	(Spain) Hércules	Free
30 August 2010	João Pedro	Brazil	(Brazil) Atlético Mineiro	Palermo	€2.45M
30 August 2010	Antonio Candreva	Italy	Udinese	Parma	Loan, €500,000
2010-08-30	Gelson Fernandes	Switzerland	(France) Saint-Étienne	Chievo	Loan
2010-08-30	Andrea De Falco	Italy	Chievo	Sassuolo	Loan
2010-08-30	Jonni Cabrera	Paraguay	Udinese	(Spain) Granada	Loan
2010-08-30	Alain Nef	Switzerland	Udinese	(Switzerland) Young Boys	Loan
2010-08-30	Hassan Yebda	Algeria	(Portugal) Benfica	Napoli	Loan
2010-08-30	Manuel Coppola	Italy	Parma	Lecce	Loan
2010-08-30	Andrea Rispoli	Italy	Parma	Lecce	Loan
2010-08-30	Edward Ofere	Nigeria	(Sweden) Malmö	Lecce	Undisclosed
2010-08-30	Omar El Kaddouri	Morocco	Brescia	South Tyrol	Loan
2010-08-30	Fabio Daprelà	Switzerland	(England) West Ham United	Brescia	Undisclosed
2010-08-30	Giacomo Bindi	Italy	Internazionale	Genoa	Free
2010-08-30	Giacomo Bindi	Italy	Genoa	Crotone	Co-ownership, Undisclosed
2010-08-30	Luca Ceppitelli	Italy	Andria	Bari	Undisclosed
2010-08-30	Luca Ceppitelli	Italy	Bari	Andria	Loan
2010-08-30	Juan Cruz Alvaro Armada	Spain	(Spain) Atlético Madrid	Bologna (youth)	Undisclosed
30 August 2010	Ioannis Pechlivanopoulos	Greece	(Greece) Rodopi Messounis	Internazionale (youth)	Undisclosed
2010-08-31	Nikola Vujadinović	Montenegro	Udinese	(Scotland) Aberdeen	Loan
2010-08-31	Alessio Manzoni	Italy	Parma	AlbinoLeffe	Loan
2010-08-31	Alessandro Elia	Italy	Bologna	Andria	Loan
2010-08-31	Milan Đurić	Bosnia and Herzegovina	Parma (& Cesena)	Ascoli	Loan
2010-08-31	Vasco Faisca	Italy	Padova	Ascoli	Undisclosed
2010-08-31	Marc Lewandowski	France	Padova	Ascoli	Loan
2010-08-31	Camillo Ciano	Italy	Napoli	Cavese	Loan
2010-08-31	Andrea Cristiano	Italy	AlbinoLeffe	Ascoli	Loan
2010-08-31	Alberto Galuppo	Italy	Cesena	Atletico Roma	Loan
2010-08-31	Steve Pinau	France	Genoa	(France) Bayonne	Loan
2010-08-31	Ivan Rajčić	Croatia	Bari	Barletta	Loan (Contract expired in 2011)
2010-08-31	Andrea Luca Picone	Italy	Reggina	Barletta	Co-ownership, Undisclosed
2010-08-31	Fabio Cusaro	Italy	Cesena	Bellaria	Loan
2010-08-31	Antonio Zito	Italy	Siena	Benevento	Loan
2010-08-31	Joelson	Brazil	Reggina	Benevento	Undisclosed
2010-08-31	Alessio Viola	Italy	Reggina	Benevento	Loan
2010-08-31	Nemanja Mitrović	Slovenia	Internazionale	Bologna	Co-ownership, €500
2010-08-31	Ivan Radovanović	Serbia	Atalanta	Bologna	Loan
2010-08-31	Diego Pérez	Uruguay	(France) AS Monaco	Bologna	Undisclosed
2010-08-31	Jonathan Zebina	France	Juventus	Brescia	Free
2010-08-31	Axel Vicentini	Italy	Pescara	Brindisi	Undisclosed
2010-08-31	Salvatore Temperino	Italy	Palermo	Canavese	Loan
2010-08-31	Raphael Martinho	Brazil	(Brazil) Monte Alegre (SP)	Catania	Undisclosed
2010-08-31	Yohan Benalouane	Tunisia	(France) AS Saint-Étienne	Cesena	Undisclosed
2010-08-31	Luis Jiménez	Chile	Ternana	Cesena	Loan
2010-08-31	Sacha Cori	Italy	Ternana	Cesena	Free
2010-08-31	Sacha Cori	Italy	Cesena	Carrarese	Loan, Free
2010-08-31	Igor Budan	Croatia	Palermo	Cesena	Loan
2010-08-31	Ivan Fatić	Montenegro	Genoa	Cesena	Loan
2010-08-31	Gabriele Paonessa	Italy	Parma	Cesena	Loan
2010-08-31	Nicolás Gorobsov	Argentina	Torino	Cesena	Loan
2010-08-31	Rincón	Brazil	Internazionale	Chievo	Co-ownership, Undisclosed
2010-08-31	Kévin Constant	Guinea	(France) Châteauroux	Chievo	Loan
2010-08-31	Filipe Gomes	Brazil	Siena	Como	Loan
2010-08-31	Daniele Degano	Italy	Crotone	Cosenza	Undisclosed
2010-08-31	Andrea Russotto	Italy	(Switzerland) Bellinzona	Crotone	Loan
2010-08-31	Marco Gorzegno	Italy	Brescia	Empoli	Loan
2010-08-31	Salvatore Foti	Italy	Sampdoria	Empoli	Loan
2010-08-31	Pablo Daniel Osvaldo	Italy	Bologna	(Spain) Espanyol	€4.6M
2010-08-31	Gianluca Giovannini	Italy	Padova	Foligno	Loan
2010-08-31	Carmine Cucciniello	Italy	Sampdoria	Fondi	Undisclosed
2010-08-31	Kakha Kaladze	Georgia	Milan	Genoa	Free
2010-08-31	Rocco D'Aiello	Italy	Gela	Triestina	Co-ownership, Undisclosed
2010-08-31	Danijel Aleksić	Serbia	Genoa	(Germany) Greuther Fürth	Loan
2010-08-31	Andrea Soncin	Italy	Padova	Grosseto	Undisclosed
2010-08-31	Leandro Rinaudo	Italy	Napoli	Juventus	Loan, €0.6M
2010-08-31	Armand Traoré	France	(England) Arsenal	Juventus	Loan, €0.5M
2010-08-31	Jerry Mbakogu	Nigeria	Padova	Juve Stabia	Loan
2010-08-31	Jeda	Brazil	Cagliari	Lecce	Undisclosed
2010-08-31	David Di Michele	Italy	Torino	Lecce	Undisclosed
2010-08-31	Rej Volpato	Italy	Bari	Livorno	Free
2010-08-31	Roberto Inglese	Italy	Chievo	Lumezzane	Loan
2010-08-31	Willy Aubameyang	Gabon	Milan	Monza	Loan
2010-08-31	Leonardo D'Angelo	Italy	Novara	Mantova (Serie D)	
2010-08-31	Robinho	Brazil	(England) Manchester City	Milan	€18M + bonuses
2010-08-31	Luca Righini	Italy	Vicenza	Mezzocorona	Loan
2010-08-31	Nicolao Dumitru	Italy	Empoli	Napoli	Loan
2010-08-31	Jonas Portin	Finland	Ascoli	Padova	Co-ownership, €0.9M
2010-08-31	Marco Gallozzi	Italy	Foligno	Padova	Co-ownership, Undisclosed
31 August 2010	Daniel Jara Martínez	Paraguay	(Paraguay) Club Nacional	Palermo	€350,000
2010-08-31	Abderrazzak Jadid	Morocco	Parma	(Belgium) Eupen	Loan
2010-08-31	Pablo Álvarez	Uruguay	Reggina	(Greece) Panserraikos	Loan
31 August 2010	Michele Marconi	Italy	Atalanta	Pavia	Loan
2010-08-31	Antonio Aquilanti	Italy	Lanciano	Pescara	Loan
2010-08-31	Tommaso Romito	Italy	Pescara	Lanciano	Loan
2010-08-31	Giuseppe Ingrassia	Italy	Palermo	Pergocrema	Loan
2010-08-31	Matteo Mandorlini	Italy	Parma	Piacenza	Loan
2010-08-31	Wellington Luz	Brazil	Udinese	Pisa	Co-ownership, Undisclosed
2010-08-31	Luca Tabbiani	Italy	Triestina	Pisa	Undisclosed
2010-08-31	Vito Falconieri	Italy	Ascoli	L'Aquila	Loan
2010-08-31	Francesco Potenza	Italy	Ascoli	L'Aquila	Loan
2010-08-31	Simone Calori	Italy	Vicenza	Pisa	Free
2010-08-31	Giovanni Passiglia	Italy	Vicenza	Pisa	Free
2010-08-31	Ilario Aloe	Italy	Ascoli	Pro Patria	Loan
2010-08-31	Domenico Danti	Italy	Siena	Reggina	Loan
2010-08-31	Riccardo Colombo	Italy	Torino	Reggina	Undisclosed
2010-08-31	Marco Borriello	Italy	Milan	Roma	Loan
2010-08-31	Jean Mbida	Cameroon	Vicenza	Savona	Loan
2010-08-31	Klaas-Jan Huntelaar	Netherlands	Milan	(Germany) Schalke 04	€12M
2010-08-31	Franco Brienza	Italy	Reggina	Siena	Undisclosed
2010-08-31	Carlos Adrián Valdez	Uruguay	Reggina	Siena	Loan
2010-08-31	Francesco Virdis	Italy	Sampdoria	South Tyrol	Loan
2010-08-31	Mauro Camoranesi	Italy	Juventus	(Germany) Stuttgart	Free
2010-08-31	Mario Artistico	Italy	Pescara	Ternana	Loan
2010-08-31	Filippo Antonelli	Italy	Bari	Triestina	Free
2010-08-31	Tomas Diaz Navarrete	Chile	(Belgium) Saint-Gilloise	Triestina (youth)	Loan
2010-08-31	Ojiakor Chukwuemeka	Ghana	Udinese	Triestina	Undisclosed
2010-08-31	Rocco D'Aiello	Italy	Gela	Triestina	Co-ownership, Undisclosed
2010-08-31	Luigi Scaglia	Italy	Brescia	Torino	Loan
2010-08-31	Giuseppe De Feudis	Italy	Cesena	Torino	Loan
2010-08-31	Rubinho	Brazil	Palermo	Torino	Loan
2010-08-31	Gabriele Angella	Italy	Empoli	Udinese	Co-ownership, Undisclosed
2010-08-31	Diego Fabbrini	Italy	Empoli	Udinese	Co-ownership, Undisclosed
2010-08-31	Diego Fabbrini	Italy	Udinese	Empoli	Loan
2010-08-31	Ricardo Chará	Colombia	Udinese	Empoli	Co-ownership, Undisclosed
2010-08-31	Flavio Lazzari	Italy	Udinese	Empoli	Co-ownership, Undisclosed
2010-08-31	Marius Stankevičius	Lithuania	Sampdoria	(Spain) Valencia	Loan
2010-08-31	Renan Wagner	Brazil	Vicenza	Varese	Undisclosed
2010-08-31	Emil Hallfreðsson	Iceland	Reggina	Verona	Loan
2010-08-31	Thomas Pichlmann	Austria	Grosseto	Verona	Undisclosed
2010-08-31	Claudio Della Penna	Italy	Roma	Ternana	Co-ownership, Undisclosed
2010-08-31	Andreas Landgren	Sweden	Udinese	(Netherlands) Willem II	Loan
31 August 2010	Jacopo Dezi	Italy	Giulianova	Napoli (youth)	Loan
31 August 2010	Stefano Scappini	Italy	Ravenna (co-owned with Sampdoria)	Alessandria	Loan
31 August 2010	Umberto Cazzola	Italy	Varese	Ravenna	Loan
31 August 2010	Federico Piovaccari	Italy	Ravenna	Cittadella	Co-ownership, Undisclosed
31 August 2010	Paolo Rossi	Italy	Cittadella	Ravenna	Undisclosed
31 August 2010	Paolo Marchi	Italy	Internazionale (youth)	Varese	Free
31 August 2010	Paolo Acerbis	Italy	Grosseto	Vicenza	€50,000
31 August 2010	Rachid Arma	Morocco	Cittadella	Vicenza	€500 (co-ownership with SPAL)
31 August 2010	Alexis Carra	France	Vicenza	Cittadella	Free
31 August 2010	Nicola Dal Bosco	Italy	Vicenza	Villacidrese	Loan

== Summer transfer window (date unknown) ==
Date	Name	Nationality	Moving from	Moving to	Fee
	Dražen Bolić	Serbia?	Bologna	(Switzerland) Chiasso	€1,000
	Alejandro Rodríguez	Spain	(Spain) Espanyol	Cesena (youth)	Free
	Federico Conti	Italy	Catania	Messina (amateur)	
	Filippo Tanaglia	Italy	Chievo (& Ascoli)	Giacomense	Loan
	Giuseppe Toscano	Italy	Reggina	Latina	
	Gaetano Cala	Italy	Udinese	Matera	
	Kingsley Umunegbu	Nigeria	Milan	Renate	
	Rosario Bucolo	Italy	Catania	Milazzo	Co-ownership, Undisclosed
	Christian Iannelli	Italy	Catania	Milazzo	Co-ownership, Undisclosed
	Angelo Gregorio	Italy	Cesena (youth)	Santarcangelo (amateur)	Loan
	Simone Tonelli	Italy	Cesena (youth)	Santarcangelo (amateur)	Loan
	Ameth Fall	Senegal	Cesena (youth)	Bellaria	Loan
	Filippo Fracaro	Italy	Chievo	Bassano (youth)	Loan
	Isah Eliakwu	Nigeria	Varese	(Russia) Anzhi Makhachkala	Free
	Paolo Pincio	Italy	Fiorentina	Battipagliese (amateur)	Undisclosed
	Marco Zentil	Italy	Vicenza	Pizzighettone (amateur)	Undisclosed
	Gleison Santos	Brazil	Reggina	(Greece) Skoda Xanthi	?
	Elia Ballardini	Italy	Cesena (youth)	Bellaria – I.M.	Loan
	Tommaso Morosini	Italy	AlbinoLeffe (youth)	Prato	Loan

== Out of Window Transfers ==
Date	Name	Nationality	Moving from	Moving to	Fee
2010-09-01	Adrian Piţ	Romania	Roma	(Romania) Universitatea Cluj	€5,000
2010-09-02	Massimo Zappino	Brazil	Como	Varese	Free
2010-09-02	Ângelo	Brazil	Lecce	Parma	Free
2010-09-03	Riccardo Ragni	Italy	Pescara	Ebolitana (amateur)	Loan
2010-09-03	Zdeněk Zlámal	Czech Republic	Udinese	(Czech Republic) Slavia Prague	Loan
2010-09-03	Marco Bonassi	Italy	Juventus	Voghera (amateur)	Loan
2010-09-08	Maurizio Lanzaro	Italy	Reggina	(Spain) Zaragoza	Free
2010-09-08	Kewullay Conteh	Sierra Leone	Grosseto	Piacenza	Free
2010-09-10	Claudio Bellucci	Italy	Sampdoria	Modena	Free
2010-09-10	Antonio Filippini	Italy	Livorno	Brescia	Free
2010-09-13	Roberto Baronio	Italy	Lazio	Atletico Roma	Free
2010-09-13	Mauro Esposito	Italy	Roma	Atletico Roma	Free
2010-09-16	Massimo Margiotta	Venezuela	Vicenza	Barletta	Free
2010-09-20	Jaroslav Šedivec	Czech Republic	Triestina	Salernitana	Free
2010-09-21	Maurizio Nassi	Italy	Mantova	Cittadella	Free
2010-09-23	Edoardo Catinali	Italy	Ancona	Piacenza	Free
2010-09-29	Francesco Galeoto	Italy	Crotone	Barletta	Free
2010-10-25	Salvatore Lanna	Italy	Bologna	Reggiana	Free
2010-09-29	Alex Calderoni	Italy	Triestina	Atletico Roma	Free
2010-09-29	Gabriel Ferrari	United States	Sampdoria	(Switzerland) Wohlen	Free
2010-10-04	Cristian Zenoni	Italy	Bologna	AlbinoLeffe	Free
2010-10-11	Jean Romaric Kevin Koffi	Côte d'Ivoire	Modena	Sanremese	Free
2010-10-16	Ighli Vannucchi	Italy	Empoli	Spezia	Free
2010-10-16	Luca Saudati	Italy	Empoli	Spezia	Free
8 November 2010	Michele Ferri	Italy	Vicenza	Atalanta	Free
2010-11-19	Nicola Mingazzini	Italy	Bologna	AlbinoLeffe	Free
2010-12-28	Ivan Franceschini	Italy	Cesena	Portogruaro	Free
