= List of Italian football transfers summer 2011 (August) =

This is a list of Italian football transfers for the 2011–12 season. Only moves from Serie A and Serie B are listed. The summer transfer window began from 1 July 2011, the end of the 2010–11 season, with a few transfers taking place prior to the season's complete end.

== Summer transfer windows ==
=== August ===
Date	Name	Nationality	Moving from	Moving to	Fee
1 August 2011	Alessandro Diamanti	Italy	Brescia	Bologna	Co-ownership, €1.5M
1 August 2011	Mirko Vučinić	Montenegro	Roma	Juventus	€15M
1 August 2011	Maarten Stekelenburg	Netherlands	(Netherlands) Ajax	Roma	€6.325M + Bonus (up to €1.5M)
2 August 2011	Mattia Longo	Italy	Milan (youth)	Atalanta (youth)	Undisclosed
2 August 2011	Nicolò Bianchi	Italy	Novara (youth)	Foggia	Loan
2 August 2011	Laurent Lanteri	France	Novara	Foggia	Loan
2 August 2011	Renan Wagner	Brazil	Varese (youth)	Foggia	Loan
2 August 2011	Matteo Barzotti	Italy	Novara	Folgore–Caratese (amateur)	Loan
2 August 2011	Allan Nyom	France	Udinese	(Spain) Granada	Loan
2 August 2011	Enrico Tonozzi	Italy	SPAL (youth)	Novara (youth)	Loan
2 August 2011	Marco Dalla Costa	Italy	Novara	Pro Patria	Loan
2 August 2011	Andrea Barberis	Italy	Varese (youth)	Palermo	Loan
2 August 2011	Jasmin Kurtić	Slovenia	Palermo	Varese	Loan
2 August 2011	Pietro Tripoli	Italy	Varese	Pro Vercelli	Loan
2 August 2011	Mattia Proietti	Italy	Juventus	Bassano	Co-ownership
2 August 2011	Benedetto Lorusso	Italy	Bari	Valenzana	Loan
2 August 2011	Christian Terlizzi	Italy	Catania	Varese	Free
2 August 2011	Luigi Monopoli	Italy	Bari (youth)	Viareggio	Loan
2 August 2011	Pierangelo Tarantino	Italy	Bari (youth)	Viareggio	Loan
3 August 2011	Daniele Granata	Italy	Pescara (youth)	Casale	Co-ownership, €500
3 August 2011	Francesco Dettori	Italy	Chievo	Cremonese	Loan
3 August 2011	Eugenio Giannetti	Italy	Padova (youth)	Internazionale (youth)	Loan
3 August 2011	Juan Guillermo Cuadrado	Colombia	Udinese	Lecce	Loan
3 August 2011	Christian Obodo	Nigeria	Udinese	Lecce	Loan
3 August 2011	Francesco Bardi	Italy	Internazionale (youth)	Livorno	Loan (Between co-owner)
3 August 2011	Luca Tremolada	Italy	Internazionale	Pisa	Loan
3 August 2011	Ettore Marchi	Italy	Triestina	Sassuolo	€130,000
3 August 2011	Andrea Mei	Italy	Internazionale	(Netherlands) VVV	Loan
4 August 2011	Michele Rinaldi	Italy	Bari	Benevento	Undisclosed
4 August 2011	Saphir Sliti Taïder	France	(France) Grenoble	Bologna	Free
4 August 2011	Matteo Grandi	Italy	Cesena (youth)	Borgo-a-Buggiano	Loan
4 August 2011	Dennis Esposito	Italy	Internazionale	Lecco	Loan
4 August 2011	Haris Seferovic	Switzerland	Fiorentina	(Switzerland) Neuchâtel Xamax	Loan
4 August 2011	Ivan Radovanović	Serbia	Atalanta	Novara	Loan
5 August 2011	Simone Sini	Italy	Roma	Bari	Loan
5 August 2011	Alessandro Crescenzi	Italy	Roma	Bari	Loan
5 August 2011	Adrian Stoian	Romania	Roma	Bari	Loan
5 August 2011	Raphael Martinho	Brazil	Catania	Cesena	Loan
5 August 2011	Rinaldo Cruzado	Peru	(Peru) Juan Aurich	Chievo	Undisclosed
5 August 2011	Alessandro Florenzi	Italy	Roma (youth)	Crotone	Loan
5 August 2011	Stefano Beltrame	Italy	Novara (youth)	Juventus (youth)	Co-ownership, Undisclosed
5 August 2011	Paolo Hernán Dellafiore	Italy	Palermo	Parma	Free
5 August 2011	Paolo Hernán Dellafiore	Italy	Parma	Novara	Co-ownership, €500
5 August 2011	Alain Mendy	Senegal	Unattached	Parma	Free
5 August 2011	Angelo Bencivenga	Italy	Livorno	Parma	Free
5 August 2011	Angelo Bencivenga	Italy	Parma	Pro Vercelli	Co-ownership, €500
5 August 2011	Stefano Scappini	Italy	Sampdoria	Sorrento	Loan
6 August 2011	Riccardo Ragni	Italy	Pescara	Andria	Co-ownership, €70,000
6 August 2011	Nicola Ciotola	Italy	Verona	Como	Loan
6 August 2011	Javier Pastore	Argentina	Palermo	(France) Paris Saint-Germain	€22.8M (exclude 3rd party ownership)
6 August 2011	Erik Lamela	Argentina	(Argentina) River Plate	Roma	€12M + bonus (up to €5.06M)
6 August 2011	Daniele Mannini	Italy	Napoli	Siena	Co-ownership, €0.45M
6 August 2011	Alberto Tundo	Italy	Brindisi	Siena	Free
6 August 2011	Alberto Tundo	Italy	Siena	Martina	Loan
8 August 2011	Alberto Paloschi	Italy	Milan	Chievo	Loan
8 August 2011	Sebastian Carlsén	Sweden	Internazionale	(Sweden) Helsingborg	Loan
8 August 2011	Marco Malagò	Italy	Chievo	Lumezzane	Undisclosed
8 August 2011	Matteo Contini	Italy	(Spain) Zaragoza	Siena	Loan, €300,000
9 August 2011	Oumar Diop	Senegal	Sambonifacese (youth)	Cagliari (youth)	Undisclosed
9 August 2011	Matías Silvestre	Argentina	Catania	Palermo	€7.3M
9 August 2011	Davide Lanzafame	Italy	Palermo	Catania	Co-ownership, €1M
9 August 2011	Andrea La Selva	Italy	Francavilla (Abruzzo)	Chievo (youth)	Undisclosed
9 August 2011	Alessandro Spada	Italy	Siena	Como	?
9 August 2011	Alessandro Diana	Italy	Napoli (youth)	Como	?
10 August 2011	Papa Waigo	Senegal	Fiorentina	Ascoli	Free
10 August 2011	Mario Paglialunga	Argentina	(Argentina) Rosario Central	Catania	Undisclosed
10 August 2011	Mauro Boerchio	Italy	Bari	Como	?
10 August 2011	Francesco De Luca	Italy	Cosenza	Crotone	Free
11 August 2011	Jacopo Fanucchi	Italy	Empoli	Alessandria	Undisclosed
11 August 2011	Gian Marco Pavarotti	Italy	Carpi (Allievi Regionali)	Bologna (youth)	Undisclosed
11 August 2011	Filippo Falco	Italy	Lecce (youth)	Pavia	Loan
11 August 2011	Fabio Romeo	Italy	Lecce	Pavia	Co-ownership, Undisclosed
11 August 2011	Alessandro Gazzi	Italy	Bari	Siena	€1M
12 August 2011	David Suazo	Honduras	Internazionale	Catania	Free
12 August 2011	Amadou Samb	Senegal	Chievo	Cremonese	Loan
13 August 2011	Marcos Miranda	Brazil	Fiorentina (youth)	Pro Vercelli	Loan
13 August 2011	Pietro Iemmello	Italy	Fiorentina (youth)	Pro Vercelli	Loan
13 August 2011	Piergiuseppe Maritato	Italy	Fiorentina	Vicenza	Co-ownership, €500
14 August 2011	Leandro Caruso	Argentina	Udinese	(Argentina) Godoy Cruz	Loan
14 August 2011	Jonni Cabrera	Paraguay	Udinese	(Paraguay) Luqueño	Loan
14 August 2011	Jo Inge Berget	Norway	Udinese	(Norway) Molde	Undisclosed
15 August 2011	Jean Romaric Kevin Koffi	Côte d'Ivoire	Napoli	Roma	Free
15 August 2011	Jean Romaric Kevin Koffi	Côte d'Ivoire	Roma	(Belgium) Boussu Dour Borinage	?
16 August 2011	Siniša Anđelković	Slovenia	Palermo	Ascoli	Loan
16 August 2011	Felice Natalino	Italy	Internazionale (youth, co-owned with Genoa)	Verona	Loan
17 August 2011	Rodrigo Alborno	Paraguay	(Paraguay) Libertad	Internazionale (youth)	Undisclosed
17 August 2011	Jeda	Brazil	Lecce	Novara	Loan
17 August 2011	Roger Miller Rojas	Paraguay	(Paraguay) Nacional	Palermo (youth)	€0.78M (along with Arzamendia and Verdun)
17 August 2011	Davide Luppi	Italy	Sassuolo	Portogruaro	Loan
17 August 2011	Ciro Immobile	Italy	Juventus	Pescara	Loan
17 August 2011	Alain Mendy	Senegal	Parma	Roma	€150,000
17 August 2011	McDonald Mariga	Kenya	Internazionale	(Spain) Real Sociedad	Loan
18 August 2011	Gianluca Giovannini	Italy	Padova	Ascoli	Free
18 August 2011	Marcello Falzerano	Italy	Salernitana	Chievo	Free
18 August 2011	Marcello Falzerano	Italy	Chievo	Avellino	Co-ownership, Undisclosed
18 August 2011	Justino	Brazil	Ascoli	Grosseto	Free
18 August 2011	Justino	Brazil	Grosseto	Avellino	Co-ownership, Undisclosed
18 August 2011	Houssine Kharja	Morocco	Genoa	Fiorentina	Co-ownership, Undisclosed
18 August 2011	Ernesto Torregrossa	Italy	Verona	Monza	Loan
18 August 2011	Mark Bresciano	Australia	Lazio	(United Arab Emirates) Al-Nasr	Free
18 August 2011	Emanuele Testardi	Italy	Sampdoria	Pergocrema	Loan
18 August 2011	Vedran Celjak	Croatia	Sampdoria	Pergocrema	Loan
18 August 2011	Davide Bertoncini	Italy	Genoa (youth)	Piacenza	Loan (between co-owner)
18 August 2011	Rincón	Brazil	Chievo	(France) Troyes	Undisclosed
19 August 2011	Ahmed Guilouzi	Tunisia	Modena	Cesena	Undisclosed
19 August 2011	Christian Puggioni	Italy	Reggina	Chievo	undisclosed
19 August 2011	Alessandro Tuia	Italy	Lazio	Foligno	Co-ownership, Undisclosed
19 August 2011	Tallo	Côte d'Ivoire	Chievo	Roma (youth)	Loan
20 August 2011	Federico Viviani	Italy	Crotone	Alessandria	Free
22 August 2011	Andrea Bertolacci	Italy	Roma	Lecce	Loan
22 August 2011	Andrea Menegon	Italy	Padova	Pergocrema	Free
22 August 2011	Sergio Romero	Argentina	(Netherlands) AZ	Sampdoria	€2.1 million
22 August 2011	Franco Chiavarini	Argentina	Cesena	South Tyrol	Loan
22 August 2011	Giuseppe De Feudis	Italy	Cesena	Torino	Undisclosed
23 August 2011	Andrea Soncin	Italy	Grosseto	Ascoli	Undisclosed
23 August 2011	Agostino Garofalo	Italy	Siena	Siena	Loan
23 August 2011	Dejan Stojanović	Macedonia	(Austria) Lustenau	Bologna (youth)	€0.25M + solidarity contribution
23 August 2011	Andrea Raggi	Italy	Palermo	Bologna	€0.2M
23 August 2011	Albin Ekdal	Sweden	Juventus	Cagliari	Co-ownership, €1.5M
23 August 2011	Thiago Ribeiro	Brazil	(Uruguay) Rentistas (on loan at (Brazil) Cruzeiro)	Cagliari	Loan
23 August 2011	Boukary Dramé	Senegal	(France) Sochaux	Chievo	Free
23 August 2011	Cesare Bovo	Italy	Palermo	Genoa	Loan, €0.2M
23 August 2011	Luis Muriel	Colombia	(Spain) Granada (de facto Udinese)	Lecce	Undisclosed (de facto Loan)
23 August 2011	Riccardo Regno	Italy	Livorno	Portogruaro	Loan
24 August 2011	Samuel Eto'o	Cameroon	Internazionale	(Russia) Anzhi	Undisclosed
24 August 2011	Simone Loria	Italy	Roma	Bologna	Free
24 August 2011	Nicola Legrottaglie	Italy	Milan	Catania	Free
24 August 2011	Guillermo Daniel Rodríguez	Uruguay	(Uruguay) Peñarol	Cesena	Undisclosed
24 August 2011	Simone Bentivoglio	Italy	Chievo	Sampdoria	Loan
24 August 2011	Paolo Sammarco	Italy	Sampdoria	Chievo	Loan
24 August 2011	Mattia Cassani	Italy	Palermo	Fiorentina	Loan, €2M
24 August 2011	Matías Aguirregaray	Uruguay	(Uruguay) Wanderers	Palermo	Loan, €0.25M
24 August 2011	Bright Addae (Ghana)	All Stars (Ghana)	Parma	Undisclosed	
24 August 2011	Fabrizio Grillo	Italy	(Bulgaria) CSKA Sofia	Varese	Free
25 August 2011	Germán Denis	Italy	Udinese	Atalanta	Loan
25 August 2011	Nicola Malaccari	Italy	Atalanta (youth)	Avellino	Loan
25 August 2011	Mirko Carretta	Italy	Chievo	Benevento	Co-ownership, Undisclosed
25 August 2011	Sergio Viotti	Italy	Triestina	Chievo	Undisclosed
25 August 2011	Emanuele Giaccherini	Italy	Cesena	Juventus	Co-ownership, €3M
25 August 2011	Luca Siligardi	Italy	Internazionale	Livorno	Co-ownership, €150,000
25 August 2011	Alberto Aquilani	Italy	(England) Liverpool	Milan	Loan, Free
25 August 2011	Pablo Daniel Osvaldo	Italy	(Spain) Espanyol	Roma	€15M + bonus (up to €2.5M)
25 August 2011	Massimo Gotti	Italy	Udinese	Ternana	Co-ownership, Undisclosed
25 August 2011	Mikhail Sivakov	Belarus	Cagliari	(Belgium) Zulte Waregem	€142,500
26 August 2011	Davide Galimberti	Italy	Internazionale (Giovanissimi)	Atalanta (youth)	Undisclosed
26 August 2011	Alain Mendy	Senegal	Roma	(Belgium) Brussels	Free
26 August 2011	Sulaiman Sesay Fullah	Sierra Leone	Parma (youth)	(Belgium) Brussels	Loan
26 August 2011	Sebastian Eriksson	Sweden	(Sweden) IFK Gothenburg	Cagliari	Loan, €950,000
26 August 2011	Sergio Bernardo Almirón	Argentina	Juventus	Catania	€400,000
26 August 2011	Kamil Vacek	Czech Republic	(Czech Republic) Sparta Prague	Chievo	Undisclosed
26 August 2011	Denis Alibec	Romania	Internazionale (youth)	(Belgium) Mechelen	Loan
26 August 2011	Goran Pandev	Macedonia	Internazionale	Napoli	Loan, Free
26 August 2011	Alexandros Tzorvas	Greece	(Greece) Panathinaikos	Palermo	€700,000
26 August 2011	Oscar Arzamendia	Paraguay	(Paraguay) Nacional	Palermo (youth)	€50,000
26 August 2011	Cesar Verdun	Paraguay	(Paraguay) Nacional	Palermo (youth)	€100,000
26 August 2011	Riccardo Brosco	Italy	Triestina	Parma	€200,000
26 August 2011	Riccardo Brosco	Italy	Parma	Pescara	Co-ownership, €100,000
27 August 2011	Marcos de Paula	Brazil	Chievo	Bari	Loan
27 August 2011	Andrea De Falco	Italy	Chievo	Bari	Loan
27 August 2011	Antonino Bonvissuto	Italy	Bari	Frosinone	Undisclosed
27 August 2011	Simone Iacoponi	Italy	Empoli	South Tyrol	Loan
28 August 2011	Marcelo Estigarribia	Paraguay	(Uruguay) Deportivo Maldonado	Juventus	Loan, €0.5M
28 August 2011	Marco Mancosu	Italy	Cagliari	Siracusa	Loan
28 August 2011	Carlo Camilli	Italy	Pescara	Ternana	Free
29 August 2011	Gianluca Pozzi	Italy	Monza (youth)	Atalanta (youth)	Undisclosed
29 August 2011	Diego Polenta	Uruguay	Genoa (youth)	Bari	Loan
29 August 2011	Gonzalo Bergessio	Argentina	(France) Saint-Étienne	Catania	Undisclosed
29 August 2011	Fabián Orellana	Chile	Udinese	(Spain) Celta Vigo	Loan
29 August 2011	Jorge Andrés Martínez	Uruguay	Juventus	Cesena	Loan
29 August 2011	Marcus Diniz	Brazil	Milan	Como	Loan
29 August 2011	Andrea Poli	Italy	Sampdoria	Internazionale	Loan
29 August 2011	Marco Fossati	Italy	Milan	Latina	Loan
29 August 2011	Rijat Shala	Switzerland	Novara	(Switzerland) Lugano	Undisclosed
29 August 2011	Daniele Cacia	Italy	Lecce	Padova	Loan
29 August 2011	Raffaele Napoletano	Italy	Nocerina	Paganese	?
29 August 2011	Mattia Bodano	Italy	Cagliari	Sant'Elia	Undisclosed
30 August 2011	Matteo Berti	Italy	Forlì (youth)	Bologna (Allievi Nazionali)	Loan
30 August 2011	Umberto Eusepi	Italy	Varese	Carpi	Loan
30 August 2011	Cristiano Piccini	Italy	Fiorentina (youth)	Carrarese	Loan
30 August 2011	Giacomo Rosaia	Italy	Fiorentina (youth)	Carrarese	Loan
30 August 2011	Alessandro Gambadori	Italy	Varese	Casale	Free
30 August 2011	Michael Bradley	United States	(Germany) Mönchengladbach	Chievo	Undisclosed
30 August 2011	Samuele Beretta	Italy	Internazionale	Cuneo	Loan
30 August 2011	Davide Di Quinzio	Italy	AlbinoLeffe	Cuneo	Loan
30 August 2011	Vincenzo Camilleri	Italy	Reggina	FeralpiSalò	Loan
30 August 2011	Tomas Švedkauskas	Lithuania	(Lithuania) Sūduva	Fiorentina	Loan, Free
30 August 2011	Emiliano Viviano	Italy	Internazionale	Genoa (remains at Inter, t)	Co-ownership, €5M
30 August 2011	Juraj Kucka	Slovenia	Genoa	Inter (remains at Genoa, t)	Co-ownership, €8M
30 August 2011	Pelé	Portugal	Genoa	Milan	Co-ownership, €950,000
30 August 2011	Mario Sampirisi	Italy	Milan (youth)	Genoa	Co-ownership, €1M
30 August 2011	Paolo Carbonaro	Italy	Palermo	Giulianova	Free
30 August 2011	Diego Forlan	Uruguay	(Spain) Atlético Madrid	Internazionale	Undisclosed
30 August 2011	Davide Santon	Italy	Internazionale	(England) Newcastle	Undisclosed
30 August 2011	Lorenzo Del Prete	Siena	Nocerina	Loan	
30 August 2011	Massimiliano Pesenti	Italy	AlbinoLeffe	Prato	Loan
30 August 2011	Gabriel Torje	Romania	(Romania) Dinamo Bucharest	Udinese	Undisclosed
30 August 2011	Víctor Ruiz	Spain	Napoli	(Spain) Valencia	Undisclosed
30 August 2011	Riccardo Enrico	Italy	Juventus	Valenzana	?
30 August 2011	Michele Paolucci	Italy	Siena	Vicenza	Loan
30 August 2011	Salvatore Margarita	Italy	Ascoli	Lanciano	Loan
31 August 2011	Domenico Germinale	Italy	Benevento	AlbinoLeffe	Loan
31 August 2011	Michael Cia	Italy	AlbinoLeffe	Benevento	Loan
31 August 2011	Rocco D'Aiello	Italy	Triestina	AlbinoLeffe	Loan
31 August 2011	Alin Bucuroiu	Romania	Udinese (youth)	Alessandria	Loan
31 August 2011	Filippo Boniperti	Italy	Juventus (youth)	Ascoli	Loan
31 August 2011	Carlo Ilari	Italy	Juventus (youth)	Ascoli	Loan (between co-owner)
31 August 2011	Lucas Daniel Schelotto	Italy	Cesena (youth)	Atalanta (youth)	Undisclosed
31 August 2011	Matteo Brighi	Italy	Roma	Atalanta	Loan
31 August 2011	Luca Cigarini	Italy	Napoli	Atalanta	Loan
31 August 2011	Luigi Parlato	Italy	Internazionale	Atletico BP Pro Piacenza (youth)	Undisclosed
31 August 2011	Gianmarco Zigoni	Italy	Milan	Avellino	Loan
31 August 2011	Davide Zappacosta	Italy	Atalanta (co-owned with Isola Liri)	Avellino	Loan
31 August 2011	Mariano Bogliacino	Uruguay	Napoli	Bari	Undisclosed
31 August 2011	Jan Koprivec	Slovenia	Udinese	Bari	Loan
31 August 2011	Panagiotis Kone	Greece	Brescia	Bologna	Loan
31 August 2011	Rubén Ramos	Spain	Real Madrid	Bresica	?
31 August 2011	Davide Ferrari	Italy	Como	Brescia	Co-ownership termination
31 August 2011	Matěj Vydra	Czech Republic	Udinese	(Belgium) Club Brugge	Loan
31 August 2011	Gianmarco Ravelli	Italy	Verona	Castellana (amateur)	undisclosed
31 August 2011	Simone Masini	Italy	Ascoli	Catanzaro	Loan
31 August 2011	Christian Esposito	Australia	Novara	Catanzaro	Loan
31 August 2011	Marko Livaja	Croatia	(Croatia) Hajduk Split	Cesena	Undisclosed (de facto lending non-EU quota to Internazionale)
31 August 2011	Francesco Grandolfo	Italy	Bari (youth)	Chievo	Loan
31 August 2011	Juri Cisotti	Italy	Triestina (youth)	Chievo (youth)	Undisclosed
31 August 2011	Sergio Viotti	Italy	Chievo	Triestina	Loan
31 August 2011	César Pinares	Chile	Chievo (youth)	Triestina	?
31 August 2011	Enrique David Mateo	Brazil	Fiorentina	Campobasso	Loan
31 August 2011	Francesco Ripa	Italy	Nocerina	Como	Loan
31 August 2011	Bruno Leonardo Vicente	Brazil	Padova	Como	Loan
31 August 2011	Luca Lulli	Italy	Pescara	Como	?
31 August 2011	Jacopo Fortunato	Italy	Inter	S.P.A.L.	Loan
31 August 2011	Nicola Sansone	Italy	Parma	Crotone	Loan
31 August 2011	Kelvin Matute	Cameroon	Crotone	Latina	Loan
31 August 2011	Gianmarco Corsino	Italy	Palermo (youth)	Ebolitana	
31 August 2011	Ivan Fatić	Montenegro	Chievo	Empoli	Loan
31 August 2011	Nii Nortey Ashong	Ghana	Triestina	Fiorentina	Loan
31 August 2011	Marco Giovio	Italy	Grosseto	Foggia	Loan
31 August 2011	Marco Guidone	Italy	Grosseto	Foligno	Loan
31 August 2011	Zsolt Tamási	Hungary	Ascoli (& Parma, c)	Fondi	Loan
31 August 2011	Antonio Tognarelli	Italy	Empoli (youth)	Gavorrano	Loan
31 August 2011	Andrea Caracciolo	Italy	Brescia	Genoa	Co-ownership, €1.5M
31 August 2011	Samuele Olivi	Italy	Pescara	Grosseto	Free
31 August 2011	Luca Antei	Italy	Roma (youth)	Grosseto	Loan
31 August 2011	Federico Moretti	Italy	Catania	Grosseto	Loan
31 August 2011	Marco Calderoni	Italy	Piacenza	Grosseto	Undisclosed
31 August 2011	Marco Calderoni	Italy	Grosseto	Piacenza	Loan
31 August 2011	Francesco Curcio	Italy	Grosseto	Piacenza	Loan
31 August 2011	Francesco Lunardini	Italy	Parma	Gubbio	Loan
31 August 2011	Gabriele Paonessa	Italy	Parma	Gubbio	Loan
31 August 2011	Giordano Maccarone	Italy	Milazzo	Catania	Co-ownership resolution, €45,000
31 August 2011	Giordano Maccarone	Italy	Catania	Gubbio	Loan
31 August 2011	Mohamadou Sissoko	France	Udinese	(Scotland) Kilmarnock	Loan
31 August 2011	Christoph Knasmüllner	Austria	Internazionale (youth)	(Germany) Ingolstadt	Undisclosed
31 August 2011	Mauro Zárate	Argentina	Lazio	Internazionale	Loan
31 August 2011	Lorenzo Tassi	Italy	Brescia (youth)	Internazionale (youth)	Co-ownership, Undisclosed
31 August 2011	Eljero Elia	Netherlands	(Germany) Hamburg	Juventus	€9M + €1M bonus
31 August 2011	Marco Sau	Italy	Cagliari	Juve Stabia	Loan
31 August 2011	Giorgio Capece	Italy	Ascoli	Lanciano	Loan
31 August 2011	Luigi Amabile	Italy	Nocerina	Lanciano	?
31 August 2011	Massimo Oddo	Italy	Milan	Lecce	Loan
31 August 2011	Manuel Giandonato	Italy	Juventus (youth)	Lecce	Loan, Free
31 August 2011	Cristian Pasquato	Italy	Juventus	Lecce	Loan, Free
31 August 2011	Andrea Russotto	Italy	(Switzerland) Bellinzona	Livorno	Undisclosed
31 August 2011	Antonio Piccolo	Italy	Piacenza	Livorno	Co-ownership, €100,000
31 August 2011	Francesco Volpe	Italy	Livorno	Piacenza	Co-ownership, €500
31 August 2011	Fabrizio Di Bella	Italy	Livorno	Piacenza	Loan, Free
31 August 2011	Antonio Giosa	Italy	Reggina	Lumezzane	Loan
31 August 2011	Fernando Tissone	Argentina	Sampdoria (& Udinese, c)	Mallorca (Spain)	Loan, Free
31 August 2011	Samuele Dalla Bona	Italy	Napoli	Mantova	Free
31 August 2011	Antonio Nocerino	Italy	Palermo	Milan	€500,000
31 August 2011	Umberto Nappello	Italy	Palermo (youth)	Monza	Loan, Free
31 August 2011	Francesco Mirko Velardi	Italy	Palermo	Monza	Loan, Free
31 August 2011	Ignacio Fideleff	Argentina	(Argentina) Newell's Old Boys	Napoli	€1.7M
31 August 2011	Luís Gabriel Sacilotto	Brazil	Lanciano	Nocerina	Undisclosed
31 August 2011	Davide Succi	Italy	Palermo	Padova	Loan, Free
31 August 2011	Edgar Barreto	Paraguay	Atalanta	Palermo	€5.3M
31 August 2011	Edgar Álvarez	Honduras	Bari	Palermo	€650,000 + €50,000 agent fee
31 August 2011	Francesco Della Rocca	Italy	Bologna	Palermo	Co-ownership, €3.5M
31 August 2011	Sergio Floccari	Italy	Lazio	Parma	Loan
31 August 2011	Seyi Adeleke	Nigeria	Lazio (youth)	Pergocrema	Loan
31 August 2011	Alessandro Di Mario	Italy	Lazio (youth)	Pergocrema	Loan
31 August 2011	Giuseppe Capua	Italy	Lazio (youth)	Pergocrema	Loan
31 August 2011	Manuel Ricci	Italy	Lazio	Pergocrema	Loan
31 August 2011	Cristian Melinte	Romania	Palermo	(Romania) Petrolul Ploiești	Loan
31 August 2011	Giuseppe Rizza	Italy	Livorno	Pergocrema	Loan
31 August 2011	Massimo Melucci	Italy	Cittadella	Piacenza	Free
31 August 2011	Andrea Parola	Italy	Novara	Piacenza	Free
31 August 2011	Andrea Pisanu	Italy	Bologna	Prato	Loan
31 August 2011	Antonio Esposito	Italy	Internazionale	Piacenza	Loan
31 August 2011	Nicola Dal Bosco	Italy	Vicenza	Poggibonsi	Loan
31 August 2011	Alessandro Armenise	Italy	Varese	Pro Vercelli	Free
31 August 2011	Selim Ben Djemia	Tunisia	Genoa	(France) Red Star	Loan
31 August 2011	Ramzi Aya	Italy	Fiorentina	Reggiana	Co-ownership, €500
31 August 2011	Francesco Bini	Italy	Piacenza	Reggina	Loan
31 August 2011	Simon Kjær	Denmark	(Germany) Wolfsburg	Roma	Loan, €3M + bonus (up to €0.75M)
31 August 2011	Miralem Pjanić	Bosnia–Herzegovina	(France) Lyon	Roma	€11M
31 August 2011	Fernando Gago	Argentina	(Spain) Real Madrid	Roma	Loan, €0.5M
31 August 2011	Fabio Borini	Italy	Parma	Roma	Loan, €1.25M
31 August 2011	Pasquale Foggia	Italy	Lazio	Sampdoria	Loan
31 August 2011	Tommaso Bianchi	Italy	Piacenza	Sassuolo	Co-ownership, €300,000
31 August 2011	Leonardo Massoni	Italy	Sassuolo	Lanciano	Loan
31 August 2011	Leonardo Pavoletti	Italy	Sassuolo	Lanciano	Loan
31 August 2011	Mario Titone	Italy	Sassuolo	Lanciano	Undisclosed
31 August 2011	Pablo González	Argentina	Palermo	Siena	Loan, €100,000
31 August 2011	Milan Milanović	Serbia	Palermo	Siena	Loan (de facto borrow non-EU quota))
31 August 2011	Zdeněk Zlámal	Czech Republic	Bari (& Udinese, c)	(Czech Republic) Sigma Olomouc	Loan
31 August 2011	Andrey Galabinov	Bulgaria	Livorno	Sorrento	Loan, Free
31 August 2011	Luca Tognozzi	Italy	Pescara	Sorrento	Undisclosed
31 August 2011	Amedeo Calliari	Italy	Chievo	South Tyrol	Loan
31 August 2011	Salif Dianda	Burkina Faso	Verona	Ternana	Loan
31 August 2011	Juan Surraco	Uruguay	Udinese	Torino	Loan
31 August 2011	Riccardo Allegretti	Italy	Grosseto	Triestina	Undisclosed
31 August 2011	Davis Curiale	Italy	Palermo	Triestina	Undisclosed
31 August 2011	Stefano D'Agostino	Italy	Sampdoria	Triestina	Co-ownership, €500
31 August 2011	Simone Motta	Italy	Novara	Triestina	Loan
31 August 2011	Francesco Evola	Italy	Novara	Triestina	Loan
31 August 2011	Daniele Padelli	Italy	Sampdoria	Udinese	Loan
31 August 2011	Miguel Medina	Paraguay	(Paraguay) Sport Colombia	Udinese	Undisclosed
31 August 2011	Roberto Pereyra	Argentina	(Argentina) River Plate	Udinese	Undisclosed
31 August 2011	Daniele Mori	Italy	Empoli	Udinese	Co-ownership, Undisclosed
31 August 2011	Daniele Mori	Italy	Udinese	Empoli	Loan
31 August 2011	Luca Minelli	Italy	Ternana	Varese	Co-ownership, Undisclosed
31 August 2011	Walter Bressan	Italy	Sassuolo	Varese	Loan
31 August 2011	Daniele Martinetti	Italy	Sassuolo	Varese	Undisclosed
31 August 2011	Víctor Hugo Mareco	Paraguay	Brescia	Verona	Loan
31 August 2011	Matthias Lepiller	France	Fiorentina	Verona	Loan
31 August 2011	Saša Bjelanović	Croatia	Atalanta	Verona	Undisclosed
31 August 2011	Błażej Augustyn	Poland	Catania	Vicenza	Loan
31 August 2011	Marco Franceschin	Italy	Triestina	Vicenza	Undisclosed
31 August 2011	Davide Bariti	Italy	Triestina	Vicenza	Undisclosed (signed along with Napoli)
31 August 2011	Filippo Forò	Italy	Vicenza	Triestina	Loan
31 August 2011	Luca Esposito	Italy	Verona (youth)	Virtus Verona (amateur)	Undisclosed

Clubs in Italic means the players had spent on loan at season.

=== Date unknown ===
Date	Name	Moving from	Moving to	Fee
3 August 2011	Ofosu Asiedu	Novara (youth)	Como	Loan
10 to 24 August 2011	Simone Amadio	Udinese (youth)	Celano	?
	Giuseppe Pacini	Siena (youth)	Fondi	Loan
	Filippo Tanaglia	Chievo	Giacomense	Loan
	Andrea Mandorlini	Vicenza	Giacomense	Loan
	Daniele Agosti	Parma (youth)	Fidenza (amateur)	?
	Kingsley Umunegbu (Nigeria)	Milan	Chiasso (Switzerland)	Free
	Tommaso Squillace	Reggina	Catanzaro	Co-ownership, Undisclosed
	Francesco Virdis	Sampdoria	Progetto Sant'Elia (amateur)	Free

== Out of window transfers ==
Date	Name	Nationality	Moving from	Moving to	Fee
1 September 2011	Filippo Amadio	Italy	Internazionale	Ascoli	Free
2 September 2011	Juri Tamburini	Italy	Modena	Ascoli	Free
2 September 2011	Leandro Vitiello	Italy	Grosseto	Ascoli	Free
2 September 2011	Reto Ziegler	Switzerland	Juventus	(Turkey) Fenerbahçe	Loan, €0.6M
5 September 2011	Nicolás Gorobsov	Italy	Torino (co-owned with Vicenza)	(Romania) Politehnica Timișoara	Loan
8 September 2011	Filippo Savi	Italy	Parma	(Belgium) Brussels	?
8 September 2011	Salvatore D'Alterio	Italy	Pescara	Messina	Free
9 September 2011	Giacomo Tedesco	Italy	Reggina	Trapani	Free
9 September 2011	Fernando Marqués	Spain	(Spain) Terrassa	Parma	?
12 September 2011	Daniele De Vezze	Italy	Torino	Pergocrema	Free
21 September 2011	Marcello Cottafava	Italy	Triestina	Gubbio	Free
26 September 2011	Pedro Kamata	Congo DR	Bari	(France) Yzeure	Free
3 October 2011	Nelson Rivas	Colombia	Internazionale	(United States) Montreal Impact	Free
4 October 2011	Andrea Manucci	Italy	Cittadella	Prato	Free
19 October 2011	Davide Carteri	Italy	Cittadella	Sambenedettese	Free
20 October 2011	Gianluca Galasso	Italy	Bari	Triestina	Free
27 October 2011	Mattia Graffiedi	Italy	Piacenza	Gubbio	Free
23 November 2011	Nicola Mora	Italy	Grosseto	Spezia	Free
30 November 2011	Alberto Giuliatto	Italy	Lecce	Nocerina	Free
