= Ugo Gabrieli =

Italian footballer

Personal information
- Date of birth: 6 June 1989 (age 37)
- Place of birth: Gallipoli, Italy
- Height: 1.90 m (6 ft 3 in)
- Position: Goalkeeper

Youth career
- Lecce

Senior career*
| Years | Team | Apps | (Gls) |
| 2008–2013 | Lecce | 2 | (0) |
| 2008–2009 | → Poggibonsi (loan) | 34 | (0) |
| 2009–2010 | → Cosenza (loan) | 12 | (0) |
| 2010–2011 | → Paganese (loan) | 15 | (0) |
| 2011 | → Barletta (loan) | 12 | (0) |
| 2013 | Casale | 7 | (0) |
| 2014 | Prato | 1 | (0) |
| 2014–2015 | Gallipoli | 16 | (0) |
| 2015–2016 | Martina | 7 | (0) |
| 2017 | Madre Pietra Apricena | 1 | (0) |
| 2017–2018 | Melfi | | |
| 2018–2019 | Martina | | |
| 2020–2021 | Gallipoli | | |
| 2021–2022 | ASD Soccer Dream Parabita | | |

International career
| 2006–2007 | Italy U18 | 2 | (0) |
| 2007–2008 | Italy U19 | 5 | (0) |
- * Club domestic league appearances and goals as of 16 October 2026

Ugo Gabrieli (born 6 June 1989) is an Italian footballer who plays as a goalkeeper.

== Club career ==
=== Early career ===
Born in Gallipoli, in the Province of Lecce, Apulia, Gabrieli started his career at local side U.S. Lecce.

Gabrieli joined Poggibonsi on loan in July 2008 in order to gain first team experience. That season the club also signed young keepers Gaetano Lattanzi and Valerio Mollo. Gabrieli fought off competition from his teammates to win a starting place in the team, and played all 34 league matches of the Lega Pro Seconda Divisione.

In July 2009 he joined Cosenza on loan along with Giuseppe Caccavallo. He was the understudy of Andrea Pinzan until Pinzan was exchanged with Giancarlo Petrocco. At first Gabrieli was a backup to Petrocco, but he replaced Petrocco in round 24 (21 February), and was promoted to the club's first choice keeper. Gabrieli also replaced Petrocco in round 21 (24 January).

Gabrieli left for Paganese in August 2010, rejoining Lecce team-mates Gianmarco Ingrosso and Vittorio Triarico. He was the club's first choice keeper until the arrival of Paolo Ginestra in December. In January 2011 he was signed by Barletta, as the team's first choice keeper ahead of Giuseppe Di Masi and the injured Andrea Tesoniero.

=== Return to Lecce ===
On 1 July 2011, Gabrieli returned to Lecce, wearing the number one jersey. However, he was the understudy to Júlio Sérgio and Massimiliano Benassi after Antonio Rosati was sold. He made his first start on 21 December 2011, in a 4–1 home loss to Internazionale. Before the match, coach Serse Cosmi had lost both first choice keepers and also called up Luigi Turbacci from the Primavera youth team, who was used as a backup on the bench.

He remained with Lecce for the 2012–13 Lega Pro Prima Divisione season after the club's relegation from Serie A in 2011–12 and subsequent expulsion from the Serie B for their part in the Calcio Scommesse scandal.

=== Casale ===
On 31 January 2013 he left for Casale.

=== Prato ===
On 26 March 2014, he was signed by Prato.

=== Martina ===
On 25 July 2015 Gabrieli was signed by Martina.

== International career ==
=== Italy U-19 side ===
Gabrieli was a backup goalkeeper for the Italy U-19 side in 2007 UEFA European Under-19 Football Championship elite qualification, behind Edoardo Pazzagli. Gabrieli also played once, the third and last match of that stage. Coach Francesco Rocca picked two keepers born in 1989, instead of picking from the pool of players born in 1988, the age limit of that season. Gabrieli was the starting keeper in 2008 UEFA European Under-19 Football Championship qualification, ahead of Vincenzo Fiorillo. However, Gabrieli was not selected by Rocca to the elite round, who picked Fiorillo and Carlo Pinsoglio instead.

=== Italy U-20 side ===
Since Rocca was appointed as the coach of the Italy U-20 team in 2008, he selected Gabrieli to the team at the start of 2008–09 season. However, Gabrieli failed to make a debut. Instead Gabrieli received call-up from Italy national under-20 football C team but once again failed to make his debut with the side. He was only able to play for U-20 C team (or known as "U-20 Lega Pro") in the 2009 Lega Pro Quadrangular Tournament, a tournament competed by the three U-21 representative teams from the three groups of Lega Pro Seconda Divisione, as well as the "U-20 Lega Pro" team. His team was lost to the representatives of the Group B in the final.
