= Di Masi =

Di Masi is a surname. Notable people with the surname include:

- Francesco De Masi (1930–2005), Italian conductor and film score composer
- Giuseppe Adriano Di Masi (born 1981), Italian footballer
