= Giovanni Bruno =

Italian footballer (born 1980)

Personal information
- Date of birth: 30 January 1980 (age 46)
- Place of birth: Bari, Italy
- Height: 1.78 m (5 ft 10 in)
- Position: Left back

Youth career
- Bari

Senior career*
Years	Team	Apps	(Gls)
1999–2000	Pro Vasto	27	(0)
2000–2004	Rutigliano	112	(9)
2004–2006	Frosinone	48	(0)
2006–2007	Cisco Roma	29	(1)
2007–2008	Martina	15	(3)
2008	Potenza	15	(0)
2008–2009	Reggiana	21	(0)
2009–2011	Como	21	(0)
2011	Barletta	8	(0)
- * Club domestic league appearances and goals

Giovanni Bruno (born 30 January 1980) is an Italian former footballer who played as a defender. Bruno spent entire career in Lega Pro and Serie D. He spent 6 seasons in the Italian third highest level since 2004 (except for the 2006–07 season).

== Career ==
Born in Carbonara di Bari, in the city of Bari, Apulia, Bruno started his career at local club A.S. Bari. He then spent 4 seasons in the Italian Serie D. With Pro Vasto, he faced his first relegation in 2000. Bruno won promotion with Rutigliano as the Group H playoffs winner in 2003. However, the team were relegated back to non-professional football in 2004 from Serie C2.

He then moved to Frosinone of Serie C1, winning the promotion play-offs in 2006.

He did not follow the team to Serie B, but joined Cisco Roma of Serie C2. The club finished the season as the losing semifinalists in the promotion playoffs. He was sent off in the first leg of the first round (semi-final). The second leg was played by his understudy Marco Teani who also played 17 league games in the regular season.

In 2007, he joined Martina. In January 2008 he moved to Potenza.

In August 2008 he terminated his contract with Potenza and joined Reggiana. His team finished the season as the losing semifinalists in the promotion playoffs. He only played once in the playoffs, coming on as a substitute for Davide Scantamburlo.

In August 2009 he joined Como. He did not play any games in the 2010–11 season, and left for Barletta in January 2011, in exchange for Renato Dossena.
