= Giacomo Caccin =

Italian football player

Personal information
- Date of birth: 21 March 1997 (age 29)
- Place of birth: Camposampiero, Italy
- Height: 1.86 m (6 ft 1 in)
- Position: Midfielder

Team information
- Current team: Este PD

Youth career
- –2014: Padova
- 2014–2016: Cittadella

Senior career*
Years	Team	Apps	(Gls)
2016–2019	Cittadella	6	(0)
2018–2019	→ Renate (loan)	16	(0)
2019–2020	Mestre	13	(0)
2020–	Este		

International career
2017	Italy U-20	2	(0)
- * Club domestic league appearances and goals as of 14:51, 14 December 2019 (UTC)

Giacomo Caccin (born 21 March 1997) is an Italian footballer who currently plays as a midfielder for Este PD.

== Club career ==
Caccin made his Serie B debut for Cittadella on 26 August 2017 in a game against Ascoli.

For the 2019–20 season, he joined Mestre.
