= AC Este =

Italian football club

- Full name: Associazione Calcio Este
- Nicknames: I Giallorossi (The Yellow and Reds)
- Founded: 1920
- Ground: Nuovo Stadio; Este, Italy
- Capacity: 1,200
- Chairman: Renzo Lucchiari
- Manager: Andrea Pagan
- League: Serie D
- 2022–23: 7th
- Website: www.estecalcio.it
Home colours	Away colours	Third colours

Associazione Calcio Este is an Italian association football club located in Este, Padua. It currently plays in Serie D.

== History ==
Founding and Early History

The club was founded in 1920. The club has spent most of their history in the various iterations of the 4th tier of Italian football, having spent the past 19 years of its history in the current Serie D.

For the first several decades of its existence, Este were fairly unknown, and spent most of their time in the 3rd and 4th tiers of Italian football. During fascist control in Italy, the club were briefly known as Unione Sportiva Estense.

1990s, 2000s and President Romano

In 1995, Dr. Donato Romano was appointed as president of Este. This was a time of rebuilding and recuperating from the past few years, which had seen the club fall as far down as the Prima Categoria, the 7th tier of Italian football.

At the end of the 1999 season, thanks to head coach Antonello Di Chiara, Este had gained promotion from the Prima Categoria, and would be playing the 2000 season in the Promozione.

2002 saw yet another promotion for i Giallorossi, and this time a top place finish in the league guaranteed a spot in the 2003 Eccellenza. There was yet another promotion in 2005, and the end of the Romano era was brought to a close with the club's reinstatement in Serie D.

Serie D

In 2005, Este was acquired by local businessman Renzo Lucchiari, and his brother Gianantonio Lucchiari. The start of the Lucchiari era was a bright one, with the club achieving a 10th-place finish in their first season in Serie D.

The next two seasons were ones of turmoil for Este, as in 2007 the club narrowly avoided relegation through the playout, and in 2008, the club lost the relegation playout to Virtus Verona. The club was saved from relegation due to the restructuring of the Serie D.

To avoid another season of backtracking, Este went into the summer of the 2009 season with style. The club assigned Simone Tognon. to the role of general manager, and what followed was an era of some stability. To this day the club's 2nd-place finish in the 2009–10 Serie D is their best ever finish to a league season. That year the club lost to ASD Union Quinto 2–1 on aggregate in the first round of the Serie D promotion playoff. Several more promotion bids over the next half-decade were made, but were all ultimately unsuccessful.

The club enter their 19th consecutive Serie D season in 2023–24 and currently sit 5th in the Serie D Girone C, unbeaten after 3 matches.

== Colors and badge ==
Its colors are yellow and red.

== Current squad ==
Note: Flags indicate national team as defined under FIFA eligibility rules; some limited exceptions apply. Players may hold more than one non-FIFA nationality.

No.	Pos.	Nation	Player
—	GK	ITA	Thomas Agosti
—	GK	ITA	Luca Petreto
—	GK	ITA	Klei Leba
—	GK	ITA	Alessandro Costantini
—	DF	ITA	Riccardo Pregnolato
—	DF	ITA	Giulio Gavioli
—	DF	ITA	Marco Stringari
—	DF	ITA	Albinot Shukolli
—	DF	ITA	Nenad Zivotic
—	DF	ITA	Andrea Giacomazzi
—	DF	ITA	Tommaso Calgaro
—	DF	ITA	Yuri Maset
—	DF	ITA	Giovanni Tessaro
—	DF	ITA	Francesco Piccardi
—	DF	ITA	Alessandro Munaretto
—	DF	ITA	Giacomo Zanetti

No.	Pos.	Nation	Player
—	MF	ITA	Giovanni Franzolin
—	MF	ITA	Alessandro Moracchiato
—	MF	ITA	Luca Rossi
—	MF	ITA	Roberto Guitto
—	MF	ITA	Emanuele Busetto
—	MF	ITA	Andrea Tomasi
—	MF	ITA	Samuel Marchesan
—	MF	ITA	Giacomo Caccin
—	MF	ITA	Mattia Badon
—	MF	ITA	Nicola De Vido
—	FW	ITA	Viktor Ekblom
—	FW	ITA	Lorenzo Moscatelli
—	FW	SWE	Viktor Ekblom
