= Giuseppe Pugliese =

Italian footballer

Personal information
- Date of birth: 4 November 1983 (age 42)
- Place of birth: Bari, Italy
- Height: 1.78 m (5 ft 10 in)
- Position: Left-back

Senior career*
Years	Team	Apps	(Gls)
2002–2005	Noicottaro	93	(11)
2005–2009	Monopoli	114	(2)
2009–2013	Verona		
2010–2011	→ Varese (loan)	38	(1)
2013–2014	Cittadella		

Managerial career
- 2021: Ambrosiana
- * Club domestic league appearances and goals

Giuseppe Pugliese (born 4 November 1983) is an Italian football coach and former player who played as a defender.

== Club career ==
=== Verona ===
Pugliese was signed by Verona in February 2009. In 2010 he left for Serie B Varese on a temporary basis. Pugliese returned to Verona on 1 July 2011. Despite assigned a shirt number in 2012–13 Serie B season (number 27), he did not play any game. Verona promoted at the end of season. It also saw the club transferred Pugliese to another Veneto based club: Cittadella.

=== Salernitana, Arezzo and Monza ===
Pugliese was signed by Salernitana on 28 August 2014. On 3 September he was signed by Arezzo.

On 23 January 2015 Pugliese was signed by Monza.
