= Attilio Nicodemo =

Italian footballer (born 1974)

Personal information
- Date of birth: 25 January 1974 (age 52)
- Place of birth: Rome, Italy
- Height: 1.78 m (5 ft 10 in)
- Position: Midfielder

Youth career
- ACLI Primavalle
- –1993: Lazio

Senior career*
Years	Team	Apps	(Gls)
1993–1994	Termoli	2	(0)
1994–1995	Nola	7	(0)
1995–1998	Juve Stabia	93	(2)
1998–2000	Foggia	63	(1)
2000–2001	Nice	17	(0)
2001–2002	Chieti	31	(2)
2002–2003	Florentia Viola	30	(2)
2003–2006	Teramo	87	(1)
2006–2007	Portogruaro	31	(0)
2007–2011	Sorrento	116	(2)
2011–2012	Salerno	9	(0)
Total		486	(10)
- * Club domestic league appearances and goals

Attilio Nicodemo (born 25 January 1974) is a Italian former footballer who plays as a midfielder.

== Career ==
Born in Rome, Lazio region, Nicodemo started his senior career at Serie D side Termoli, located at Molise region. He then played 5 seasons at Serie C1, for Nola, then Juve Stabia and Foggia. He followed Foggia relegated to Serie C2 in 1999. In 2000, he was bought by Roma along with Giuseppe Di Masi and Franco Brienza, and joined sister club Palermo in co-ownership deal along with Luca Ferri, for 300 million Italian lire. Brienza and Roma player Daniele De Vezze also joined the Sicily side on loan. He then loaned to French Ligue 2 side Nice, where he played 17 times. In June 2001, Palermo acquired the remained 50% registration rights for 5 billion lire. In 2001–02 season, he was loaned to Chieti. In August 2002, after Roma's president Franco Sensi sold Palermo to Maurizio Zamparini, Nicodemo and Riccardo Rimondini joined Roma.

He went to Florence for newly re-found Florentia Viola, along with Roma's Raffaele Longo, Luigi Panarelli and Antonio Rizzo.

In 2003–04 season, he was loaned to Serie C1 side Teramo. In mid season he deal became permanent. In summer 2006, he joined Serie C2 side Portogruaro. In July 2007 for Serie C1 side Sorrento.
