= Roberto Guitto =

Italian footballer

Personal information
- Date of birth: 15 February 1991 (age 35)
- Place of birth: Naples, Italy
- Height: 1.70 m (5 ft 7 in)
- Position: Midfielder

Team information
- Current team: Campodarsego

Youth career
- Empoli

Senior career*
| Years | Team | Apps | (Gls) |
| 2010–2012 | Empoli | 12 | (0) |
| 2010–2011 | → Ravenna (loan) | 31 | (1) |
| 2012–2013 | Sorrento | 24 | (0) |
| 2013–2014 | Chieti | 11 | (0) |
| 2014–2015 | Gavorrano | 12 | (0) |
| 2015–2016 | Sestri Levante | 36 | (5) |
| 2016 | Lecco | 9 | (1) |
| 2016–2020 | Gozzano | 89 | (4) |
| 2020–2021 | Città di Varese | 10 | (0) |
| 2021 | Lornano Badesse | 21 | (0) |
| 2021–2023 | Campodarsego | 67 | (3) |
| 2023–2024 | Este | 33 | (0) |
| 2024– | Campodarsego | 13 | (1) |
- * Club domestic league appearances and goals as of 10 November 2024

Roberto Guitto (born 5 February 1991) is an Italian footballer who plays as a midfielder for Serie D club Campodarsego.

== Club career ==
On 13 January 2021, Giutto joined Serie D side Lornano Badesse.
