= Franco Brienza =

Italian footballer (born 1979)

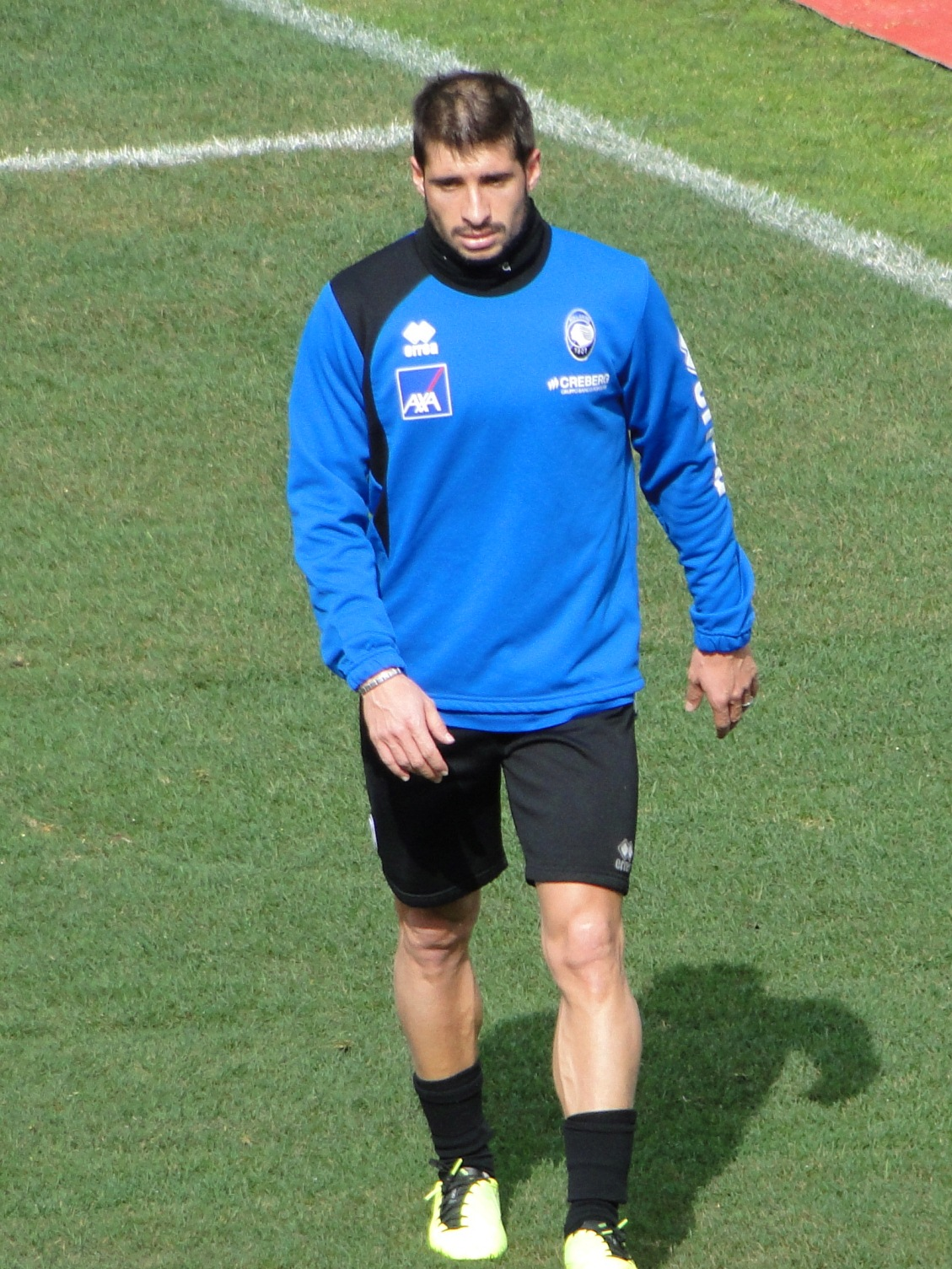
- Brienza with Atalanta in 2013

Personal information
- Date of birth: 19 March 1979 (age 47)
- Place of birth: Cantù, Italy
- Height: 1.68 m (5 ft 6 in)
- Positions: Forward; attacking midfielder

Youth career
- 1985–1994: Campagnano
- 1994–1995: Isolotto
- 1995–1996: Imolese

Senior career*
| Years | Team | Apps | (Gls) |
| 1995–1996 | Imolese | 2 | (0) |
| 1997–2000 | Foggia | 59 | (8) |
| 2000–2008 | Palermo | 137 | (15) |
| 2002–2003 | → Ascoli (loan) | 30 | (7) |
| 2004 | → Perugia (loan) | 12 | (2) |
| 2008–2010 | Reggina | 81 | (23) |
| 2010–2012 | Siena | 65 | (11) |
| 2012–2013 | Palermo | 17 | (1) |
| 2013–2014 | Atalanta | 24 | (1) |
| 2014–2015 | Cesena | 30 | (8) |
| 2015–2016 | Bologna | 29 | (3) |
| 2016–2019 | Bari | 78 | (11) |
| 2022–2023 | Ischia | 6 | (0) |

International career
| 2005 | Italy | 2 | (0) |
- * Club domestic league appearances and goals

Franco Brienza (Italian pronunciation: [ˈfraŋko briˈɛntsa]; born 19 March 1979) is an Italian former professional footballer who played as a forward or attacking midfielder. Throughout his career, he played for several Italian clubs, but is mainly known for his time with Palermo. At international level, he briefly represented Italy at senior level, making two appearances for his country in 2005.

== Club career ==
=== Early career ===
Born in Cantù but growing up in Ischia, Brienza began his footballing career with local club Campagnano, before moving to Florence at the age of 15 to play for Isolotto. In 1997–98 he joined Serie B club Foggia and stayed when the team was relegated to Serie C1 in 1998 and to Serie C2 in 1999.

=== Palermo ===
==== Under Sensi ====
In 2000, he was signed by A.S. Roma along with teammates Attilio Nicodemo and Giuseppe Di Masi, which cost Roma 100 million Italian lire for Brienza (€51,646). Roma loaned out Brienza and Nicodemo along with Roma youth products Daniele De Vezze and Luca Ferri to sister club Palermo, which Roma president Franco Sensi had acquired in March 2000. Brienza helped his club to win the league and achieve promotion to Serie B in 2001.

On 30 June 2002, he permanently joined Palermo in a co-ownership deal for €5.5 million, as part of the deal to sign Davide Bombardini, priced €11 million.

==== Under Zamparini ====
After Sensi sold the club to Maurizio Zamparini in July 2002, Brienza was out of favour at Palermo, as Zamparini bought players from his other club Venezia. The co-ownership deal was terminated on 13 August 2002 for 1 million lire (€516). His registration rights (€5,500,516) were also reduced to €1M to reflect his real value. However, the "write-down" was actually through Articolo 18-bis Legge 91/1981, which only left over the toxic asset "worth "€4,500,516" list in asset side and amortize in 10-year period. On 31 August 2002, he moved to Ascoli on loan, re-joining teammate Vincenzo Montalbano, where Brienza scored 7 goals playing as second striker.

In 2003, he returned to Palermo, playing for the Rosanero for the first half of the season before being loaned out to Perugia in January 2004 as part of an agreement that brought Fabio Grosso to Palermo, making his Serie A debut at Stadio San Siro, in an away match lost 2–1 to A.C. Milan.

He again returned to Palermo as the club won promotion to Serie A. In the 2004–05 Serie A campaign, Brienza scored an impressive 10 goals in 33 games playing just behind Luca Toni, earning a call-up to the national team.

In 2005–06, new Palermo boss Luigi Delneri, who always showed a preference to play a 4–4–2 formation, ruled out a 'free role' for Brienza, who had little space during the first half of the season. After Del Neri's dismissal, Brienza later found more space in the starting lineup with new coach Giuseppe Papadopulo. He scored only one goal in 27 matches, being also featured 13 times in the UEFA Cup, scoring three goals in the continental competition.

Following Francesco Guidolin's return to Palermo in the 2006–07 season, Brienza failed to find a stable place in the regular lineup, being featured mostly as a substitute, playing only 22 league and five UEFA Cup matches. On the 37th matchday, after a 2–1 home win to Siena, Guidolin declared his choice to use Brienza mostly as a reserve as one of his main mistakes in a troubled season which ended in a fifth place. Brienza, who originally declared his intention to leave Palermo to find more space in the lineup, remained for the 2007–08 season, later stating to have changed his mind following a meeting with new boss Stefano Colantuono.

=== Reggina ===
On 17 January 2008, it was announced that Brienza had joined Reggina on loan for €300,000. Before leaving Palermo, Brienza was the only player still contracted to Palermo who played with the rosanero in both Serie A, B and C1 divisions.

On 2 July 2008, Brienza joined Reggina permanently. The club paid around €2.2 million to buy out his Palermo contract.

=== Siena ===
Brienza joined Siena following their relegation from the Serie A in the 2010–11 season for about €700,000, signing a three-year contract. He helped the club to win an immediate return to the top flight and established himself as a first choice in the 2011–12 season under the guidance of new head coach Giuseppe Sannino, who regularly featured him as attacking midfielder.

=== Third stint at Palermo ===
On 6 June 2012, Palermo confirmed to have signed Brienza from Siena for €1.4 million on a two-year contract. The announcement came only a few hours after Palermo unveiled the hiring of Giuseppe Sannino, Brienza's former boss at Siena, as new head coach. On 18 August 2012, in the Coppa Italia match against Cremonese, Brienza reached the milestone of 200 appearances with Palermo: 168 in the league, 15 in UEFA Cup, 15 in Coppa Italia and 2 in the Supercoppa Serie C.

=== Atalanta ===
On 31 January 2013 he moved to Atalanta from Palermo for €950,000.

=== Cesena ===
On 13 August 2014 Brienza joined Serie A newcomers Cesena.

=== Bologna ===
On 24 July 2015 Brienza joined newly promoted Serie A side Bologna as a free agent after leaving relegated Cesena. On 6 July 2016, he signed a new one-year contract.

=== Bari ===
On 30 August 2016 Brienza was sold to Bari from Bologna.

After the club's exclusion from professional football and its refoundation under the ownership of Aurelio De Laurentiis, Brienza re-signed for Bari in August 2018, agreeing to remain at the club also in the Serie D league.

After helping the team with promotion to Serie C in the 2018–19 season, he left the club at the end of the campaign when his contract expired.

=== Ischia ===
In November 2022, 43-year-old Brienza went out of retirement to join hometown club Ischia in the Eccellenza fifth-tier amateur league, with the aim to help them win promotion to Serie D. He left the club by the end of the season after being part of Ischia's squad that won promotion to Serie D.

== International career ==
In 2005, Brienza was called up to the Italy national team by Marcello Lippi and was subsequently capped during a friendly North-American tour with the Azzurri, marking his debut in a 1–1 draw with Serbia and Montenegro at Rogers Centre, Toronto on 8 June 2005, replacing Giorgio Chiellini in the 64th minute. In the match against Ecuador three days later, Brienza featured in the starting lineup partnering Luca Toni and David Di Michele. Brienza and Toni were replaced by Cristiano Lucarelli and Antonio Langella at half-time in the 1–1 draw at Giants Stadium, East Rutherford, New Jersey state.

== Style of play ==
A diminutive and creative playmaker, who was known for his technique as well as his striking and passing ability with his left foot, he usually played as a forward or as an attacking midfielder, known as the Trequartista position in Italy, although he was also capable of playing as a second striker, in deep-lying creative role as a central midfielder (known as the regista position in Italy), or as a right winger, a position which allowed him to cut into the middle onto his stronger foot.

== Career statistics ==
=== Club ===
Appearances and goals by club, season and competition
| Club | Season | League | | | Coppa Italia | | Continental | | Other | | Total | |
| Club | Season | Division | Apps | Goals | Apps | Goals | Apps | Goals | Apps | Goals | Apps | Goals |
|---|---|---|---|---|---|---|---|---|---|---|---|---|
| Palermo | 2001–02 | Serie B | 29 | 2 | 0 | 0 | — | | — | | 29 | 2 |
| Palermo | 2002–03 | Serie B | 0 | 0 | 2 | 0 | — | | — | | 2 | 0 |
| Palermo | 2003–04 | Serie B | 18 | 1 | 2 | 0 | — | | — | | 20 | 1 |
| Palermo | 2004–05 | Serie A | 33 | 10 | 4 | 1 | — | | — | | 37 | 11 |
| Palermo | 2005–06 | Serie A | 27 | 1 | 3 | 1 | 9 | 3 | — | | 39 | 4 |
| Palermo | 2006–07 | Serie A | 22 | 0 | 2 | 1 | 4 | 1 | — | | 28 | 2 |
| Palermo | 2007–08 | Serie A | 8 | 1 | 0 | 0 | 1 | 0 | — | | 9 | 1 |
| Palermo | Total | | 137 | 15 | 13 | 2 | 14 | 4 | 0 | 0 | 164 | 21 |
| Ascoli (loan) | 2002–03 | Serie B | 30 | 7 | 1 | 0 | — | | — | | 31 | 7 |
| Perugia (loan) | 2003–04 | Serie A | 12 | 2 | 0 | 0 | — | | 2 | 0 | 14 | 2 |
| Reggina | 2007–08 | Serie A | 20 | 7 | 0 | 0 | — | | — | | 20 | 7 |
| Reggina | 2008–09 | Serie A | 32 | 5 | 1 | 2 | — | | — | | 33 | 7 |
| Reggina | 2009–10 | Serie B | 29 | 11 | 2 | 2 | — | | — | | 31 | 13 |
| Reggina | Total | | 81 | 23 | 3 | 4 | 0 | 0 | 0 | 0 | 84 | 27 |
| Siena | 2010–11 | Serie B | 29 | 7 | 1 | 0 | — | | — | | 30 | 7 |
| Siena | 2011–12 | Serie A | 36 | 4 | 3 | 0 | — | | — | | 39 | 4 |
| Siena | Total | | 65 | 11 | 4 | 0 | 0 | 0 | 0 | 0 | 69 | 11 |
| Palermo | 2012–13 | Serie A | 17 | 1 | 2 | 0 | — | | — | | 19 | 1 |
| Atalanta | 2012–13 | Serie A | 6 | 0 | 0 | 0 | — | | — | | 6 | 0 |
| Atalanta | 2013–14 | Serie A | 18 | 1 | 0 | 0 | — | | — | | 18 | 1 |
| Atalanta | Total | | 24 | 1 | 0 | 0 | 0 | 0 | 0 | 0 | 24 | 1 |
| Cesena | 2014–15 | Serie A | 30 | 8 | 1 | 0 | — | | — | | 31 | 8 |
| Bologna | 2015–16 | Serie A | 29 | 3 | 1 | 0 | — | | — | | 30 | 3 |
| Bologna | 2016–17 | Serie A | 0 | 0 | 1 | 0 | — | | — | | 1 | 0 |
| Bologna | Total | | 29 | 3 | 2 | 0 | 0 | 0 | 0 | 0 | 31 | 3 |
| Bari | 2016–17 | Serie B | 27 | 5 | 1 | 0 | — | | — | | 28 | 5 |
| Bari | 2017–18 | Serie B | 30 | 4 | 3 | 0 | — | | — | | 33 | 4 |
| Bari | 2018–19 | Serie D | 21 | 2 | | | — | | — | | 21 | 2 |
| Bari | Total | | 78 | 11 | 4 | 0 | 0 | 0 | 0 | 0 | 82 | 11 |
| Career total | | | 503 | 82 | 30 | 7 | 14 | 4 | 2 | 0 | 549 | 93 |

=== International ===
Appearances and goals by national team and year
| National team | Year | Apps | Goals |
|---|---|---|---|
| Italy | 2005 | 2 | 0 |
| Total | | 2 | 0 |
