= Ricardo Villar (Argentine footballer) =

Argentine footballer

Personal information
- Full name: Ricardo José Villar Rodríguez
- Date of birth: 2 January 1989 (age 37)
- Place of birth: San Salvador de Jujuy, Argentina
- Height: 1.68 m (5 ft 6 in)
- Position: Midfielder

Team information
- Current team: Millesimo

Youth career
- Gorriti
- Sportivo Palermo
- 2004–2005: Salernitana
- 2005–2008: Cesena
- 2009–2010: Udinese

Senior career*
Years	Team	Apps	(Gls)
2006–2008	Cesena	9	(0)
2009–2010	Udinese	0	(0)
2010	→ Cremonese (loan)	7	(2)
2010–2011	Triestina	1	(0)
2011	→ Como (loan)	21	(0)
2012–2013	San Luis	10	(1)
2014-2016	Central Norte	38	(10)
2016-2019	Sarmiento de Resistencia	58	(4)
2019-2020	Douglas Haig	19	(3)
2020-2021	Chaco for Ever	8	(0)
2021	Unión Sunchales	27	(2)
2022	Gimnasia y Tiro	7	(0)
2022	Toma Maglie	7	(0)
2022–2023	Novoli	13	(1)
2023–	Millesimo	81	(43)
- * Club domestic league appearances and goals

Ricardo José Villar Rodríguez (born 2 January 1989) is an Argentine footballer who plays for Millesimo.

== Career ==
He was signed for Cesena along with his brother Matías Villar which both left Sportivo Palermo and Salernitana at the same time. But Matías played for Verucchio in 2006–07 season.

He made his first team debut during 2006–07 season. Villar joined Udinese Calcio on 30 January 2009. He played two half seasons at Primavera, while the second one (2009–10) as overage player.

In January transfer windows, he left for Cremonese on loan. In mid-2010 he was sold to Triestina and immediately loaned to Como.

He was transferred to Chilean club San Luis de Quillota in the Primera B. After this experience, he came back to Argentina and played for several clubs that took part in Torneo Federal A. In 2022 he moved to Italy and continued to play in amateur leagues.

In 2023, Villar joined Millesimo in Prima Categoria, the seventh level in the Italian football league system; in the 2023–24 season the team achieved a double, winning both the Group A of Prima Categoria Liguria and the regional category cup. Moreover, Villar was the top scorer of Group A with 17 goals. The following season, in Promozione, ended with another title and consequently with the team's promotion to the fifth (and highest regional) level, with Villar once again being the league's top scorer with 23 goals. In the 2025–26 season he contributed to the team winning their third consecutive title, gaining promotion to Serie D for the first time in the club's history.

== Honours ==
Millesimo

- Eccellenza: 2025-26 (Liguria)
- Promozione: 2024-25 (Liguria, Group A)
- Prima Categoria: 2023-24 (Liguria, Group A)
- Liguria Cup, Prima Categoria: 2023–24

Individual

- Promozione top scorer: 2024-25 (23 goals, Group A)
- Prima Categoria top scorer: 2023-24 (17 goals, Group A)
