= Luigi Monopoli =

Italian footballer

Personal information
- Date of birth: 11 April 1992 (age 34)
- Place of birth: Bitonto, Italy
- Position: Defender

Team information
- Current team: Vigor Trani

Youth career
- Bari

Senior career*
Years	Team	Apps	(Gls)
2011–2014	Bari	0	(0)
2011–2012	→ Viareggio (loan)	9	(0)
2012–2013	→ Vigor (loan)	22	(1)
2013–2014	→ Paganese (loan)	15	(0)
2014–2015	Viareggio 2014	?	(0)
2015–2016	Bisceglie	?	(?)
2016	Bitonto	?	(?)
2016–2017	Barletta	?	(?)
2017–	Vigor Trani	?	(?)

International career
2008	Italy U16 (Note: Monopoli received a call-up to a friendly tournament in March 2008, however the archive of Italian Football Federation did not have the record of the matches (Ireland, Turkey, Malta), thus his cap for the under-16 team was at least 4, as indicated by the archive, and a (unused?) substitute appearance against Turkey, as indicated by Turkish Football Federation.)	4	(0)
2008	Italy U17	2	(1)
2010	Italy U18	1	(0)
- * Club domestic league appearances and goals

Luigi Monopoli (born 11 April 1992) is an Italian footballer who plays for U.S. Calcio Vigor Trani.

== Biography ==
Born in Tritonto, the province of Bari, Apulia, Monopoli started his career at Bari, where he was the member of under-15 team in 2005–06 season, which finished as the runner-up; U-17 in 2008–09 and the under-19 reserve from 2009 to 2011. Monopoli also received call-up to the youth teams of Italy from 2007 to 2008 and from 2009 to 2010, all friendlies and training camp. Since 2011 he left the Serie B for various third division club: Viareggio (2011–12 season), Vigor Lamezia (2012–13 season) and Paganese (2013–14 season).
