= Andrea Tesoniero =

Italian footballer (born 1988)

Personal information
- Date of birth: 28 January 1988 (age 38)
- Place of birth: Vallo della Lucania, Italy
- Height: 1.94 m (6 ft 4 in)
- Position: Goalkeeper

Team information
- Current team: ASD Calpazio 1963

Youth career
- Melfi
- 2005–2006: Arezzo
- 2006–2007: Ternana

Senior career*
Years	Team	Apps	(Gls)
2007–2008	Arrone	18	(0)
2008–2010	Potenza	19	(0)
2010–2012	Barletta	6	(0)
2012–2013	Milazzo	24	(0)
2017	Potenza	2	(0)
2017–2019	Battipagliese		
2019–2021	Virtus Cilento 2019		
2021	Salernum Baronissi 2008		
2021–2022	ASD Rossoblu Castel San Giorgio		
2022–2023	ASD Calpazio 1963		
2023–2024	Ebolitana		
2024–	ASD Calpazio 1963		
- * Club domestic league appearances and goals as of 16 October 2026

Andrea Tesoniero (born 28 January 1988) is an Italian footballer who plays as a goalkeeper for ASD Calpazio 1963.

== Career ==
Born in Vallo della Lucania, Campania, Tesoniero started his career at Melfi. In the 2005–06 season, he left for Arezzo, but subsequently left the club for Ternana mid-season. He then left for Serie D club Arrone in the 2007–08 season. He then played with Potenza for two seasons.

After the club's bankruptcy, he signed a two-year contract with Barletta in 2010. He was the team's first choice goalkeeper, ahead Giuseppe Di Masi and Renato Dossena, until he was injured. He was released on 30 August 2011.
