= Matteo Barzotti =

Italian footballer

Personal information
- Date of birth: 30 March 1992 (age 34)
- Place of birth: Cagli, Italy
- Height: 1.80 m (5 ft 11 in)
- Position: Forward

Team information
- Current team: Varese
- Number: 30

Youth career
- 2007–2010: AC Milan

Senior career*
Years	Team	Apps	(Gls)
2010–2011	Caratese	24	(2)
2011–2013	Folgore Caratese	77	(17)
2013–2014	Olginatese	18	(3)
2014–2016	Caronnese	72	(26)
2016–2018	Monza	43	(10)
2018	Seregno	14	(8)
2018–2019	Fanfulla	33	(8)
2020	AC Vigasio	6	(1)
2020–2021	ASD Brusaporto	9	(1)
2021	ASD NibionnOggiono	23	(10)
2021–2022	Sangiuliano City	35	(15)
2022–2023	Pistoiese	32	(12)
2023–2024	Giana Erminio	22	(1)
2024–	Varese	59	(17)
- * Club domestic league appearances and goals as of 25 June 2026

Matteo Barzotti (born 30 March 1992) is an Italian footballer who plays as a forward for Serie D Group A club Varese.

== Club career ==
On 22 July 2022, Barzotti joined Pistoiese in Serie D.

On 17 July 2023, he moved to Giana Erminio.

== Personal life ==
Barzotti was born in Italy to an Italian father and Dominican mother.

== Honours ==
=== Club ===
Monza

- Serie D: 2016-17
- Scudetto Dilettanti: 2016-17

Sangiuliano city

- Serie D: 2021-22
