= Alain Mendy =

Senegalese footballer (born 1989)

Personal information
- Full name: Alain Pierre Mendy
- Date of birth: 17 November 1989 (age 36)
- Place of birth: Dakar, Senegal
- Height: 1.83 m (6 ft 0 in)
- Position: Central midfielder

Team information
- Current team: AS Vitré

Youth career
- 2002–2008: US Gorée
- 2008–2009: Mantova

Senior career*
Years	Team	Apps	(Gls)
2009–2010	Mantova	2	(0)
2011	Parma	0	(0)
2011	Roma	0	(0)
2011–2012	Brussels	22	(2)
2012–2013	Waasland-Beveren	4	(0)
2014–2015	Fostiras	5	(0)
2015–2016	SC Cruas	5	(0)
2016–2017	UMS Montélimar	5	(0)
2017–2024	La Roche VF	111	(12)
2024–	AS Vitré	3	(0)
- * Club domestic league appearances and goals as of 22 February 2025

Alain-Pierre Mendy (born 17 November 1989) is a Senegalese professional footballer who plays as a central midfielder for French club AS Vitré.

== Biography ==
Born in Dakar, Senegal, Mendy started his professional career in Italy. He was a member of Mantova's Primavera under-20 team in 2008–09 season. He played his first professional game in the Serie B on 16 May 2009 against Empoli, coming off the bench in the 77th minute for Mattia Marchesetti. He then remained in Primavera as an overage player. After Mantova finished in 20th place, was relegated and suffered bankruptcy, Mendy was released.

Mendy was without a club for on season. It was due to FIGC allowed non-EU players to join youth teams if they joined Italy with reason other than football, they were not allowed to play as a professional player in Italy. He trialled at Nocerina in July 2010.

On 5 August 2011, he was signed by Serie A club Parma and left for Pro Vercelli along with Angelo Bencivenga. However the deal collapsed. On 19 August he left for fellow top division club A.S. Roma for €150,000 on a one-year contract. On 26 August he was sold to Brussels on free transfer, along with Parma two weeks "teammate" Sulaiman Sesay Fullah, who was also unable to register in Italy. The transaction also allowed Roma to fulfil the non-EU registration quota.

After one season at Brussels, he moved to newly promoted Waasland-Beveren.
