= Giuseppe Di Masi =

Italian footballer

Personal information
- Full name: Giuseppe Adriano Di Masi
- Date of birth: 16 July 1981 (age 45)
- Place of birth: Foggia, Italy
- Height: 1.91 m (6 ft 3 in)
- Position: Goalkeeper

Team information
- Current team: Lucchese (goalkeeping coach)

Youth career
- –1999: Foggia

Senior career*
Years	Team	Apps	(Gls)
1999–2000	Foggia	22	(0)
2000–2001	Roma	0	(0)
2001	→ Palermo (loan)	2	(0)
2001–2003	Reggiana	13	(0)
2003	→ Pisa (loan)	0	(0)
2003–2005	Acireale	27	(0)
2005–2007	Sangiovannese	57	(0)
2007–2009	Igea Virtus	56	(0)
2009–2011	Barletta	44	(0)
2011–2012	Marsala	25	(0)
2012–2014	Avellino	11	(0)
2014–2018	Lucchese	61	(0)
Total		318	(0)
- * Club domestic league appearances and goals

Giuseppe Adriano Di Masi (born 16 July 1981) is an Italian football coach and a former goalkeeper who is currently as a goalkeeping coach for Lucchese.

== Career ==
Di Masi started his career at hometown club Foggia where he became the first choice in 1999–2000 Serie C2 season, after Foggia were relegated from Serie C1.

=== Roma ===
In 2000, he was signed by Roma along with team-mate Attilio Nicodemo and Franco Brienza. Di Masi signed a 5-year contract and cost Roma 50 million lire (€25,823). He played half the season with Roma's Primavera U20 youth team as one of the keepers along with Matteo Napoli and Simone Paoletti. In January 2000, Di Masi joined Roma's sister club Palermo (from March 2000 until July 2002) on loan, where he was re-united with Nicodemo. He played as one of the backup goalkeepers to starter Vincenzo Sicignano.

=== Reggiana ===
In July 2001, Di Masi joined Reggiana in co-ownership deal, as part of Adewale Wahab's deal to Roma. (50% registration rights of Di Masi tagged for 2,500 million lire; around €1,291,142, while Wahab tagged for 3,000 million lire; €1,549,371) From November to February he was the first choice ahead of Patrick Bettoni; however, Bettoni was later restored as the club's first choice keeper. In the 2002–03 season, Di Masi was the backup of Raffaele Nuzzo and Luca Mondini. In January 2003, he left for Serie C1 side Pisa.

=== Lega Pro ===
In June 2003, Reggiana bought the remaining 50% registration rights for Di Masi from Roma for free, but sent him to Acireale of Serie C1. He then played as first choice for Serie C1 club Sangiovannese, then for Serie C2/Lega Pro Seconda Divisione sides Igea Virtus and Barletta.

In the 2010–11 Lega Pro Prima Divisione season, the division newcomer signed Andrea Tesoniero as first choice and Renato Dossena as backup keeper, which made Di Masi the team's third choice keeper. In October, he became the team's first choice keeper in the league once again, due to Tesoniero's injury. He also played twice in 2010–11 Coppa Italia Lega Pro. In January 2011 the team signed a new keeper Ugo Gabrieli.

Di Masi was released on 30 June 2011. In October 2011 Di Masi joined Serie D club Marsala.

In July 2012 Di Masi returned to professional football with Avellino, as the backup of Ermanno Fumagalli.

In November 2024 Di Masi joined the club A.S.D. Santa Maria del Giudice.
