= Gianmarco Ingrosso =

Italian footballer

Personal information
- Date of birth: 28 January 1989 (age 37)
- Place of birth: Gagliano del Capo, Lecce, Italy
- Height: 1.86 m (6 ft 1 in)
- Position: Defender

Team information
- Current team: Virtus Verona
- Number: 38

Senior career*
Years	Team	Apps	(Gls)
2008–2013	Lecce	3	(0)
2010–2011	→ Paganese (loan)	26	(1)
2012–2013	→ L'Aquila (loan)	22	(0)
2013–2015	L'Aquila	7	(0)
2015–2017	Matera	65	(6)
2017–2021	Pisa	38	(0)
2018–2019	→ Ascoli (loan)	0	(0)
2019	→ Foggia (loan)	3	(0)
2020–2021	→ Cosenza (loan)	26	(0)
2021–2023	Pescara	43	(0)
2023–2025	Pineto	49	(1)
2026–	Virtus Verona	8	(0)
- * Club domestic league appearances and goals as of 30 April 2026

Gianmarco Ingrosso (born 28 January 1989) is an Italian professional footballer who plays as a defender for Serie D club Virtus Verona.

== Career ==
Ingrosso made his Serie A debut for his native club Lecce on 31 May 2009, when he started in a 4–1 defeat to Genoa.

In January 2010 Ingrosso was signed by Paganese in a temporary deal. On 9 August 2010 the deal was extended, which the club also signed Vittorio Triarico.

On 14 July 2015 Ingrosso was signed by Matera.

On 12 September 2020, he went to Cosenza on loan.

On 13 August 2021, he joined Pescara.

On 11 August 2023, Ingrosso signed with Pineto.
