= Vittorio Triarico =

Italian footballer

Personal information
- Full name: Vittorio Triarico Tateo
- Date of birth: 24 May 1989 (age 37)
- Place of birth: Mesagne, Italy
- Height: 1.80 m (5 ft 11 in)
- Position: Forward

Team information
- Current team: Fasano

Youth career
- Lecce

Senior career*
Years	Team	Apps	(Gls)
2006–2013	Lecce	5	(0)
2008–2009	→ Crotone (loan)	19	(1)
2009–2010	→ Taranto (loan)	2	(0)
2010–2011	→ Paganese (loan)	21	(1)
2011–2012	→ Campobasso (loan)	6	(0)
2012–2013	→ L'Aquila (loan)	27	(1)
2013–2016	L'Aquila	60	(4)
2016–2018	Virtus Francavilla	37	(4)
2018–2019	Matera	15	(2)
2019	Bisceglie	15	(5)
2019–2020	Monopoli	13	(0)
2020–2021	Bitonto	26	(2)
2021–2023	Brindisi	32	(1)
2023–	Fasano	0	(0)

International career
2005	Italy U16	1	(0)
2005–2006	Italy U17	12	(1)
2008	Italy U20	1	(0)
- * Club domestic league appearances and goals as of 7 May 2023

Vittorio Triarico Tateo (born 24 May 1989) is an Italian footballer who plays as a forward for Serie D club Fasano.

== Career ==
=== Lecce ===
Born in Mesagne, Apulia region, Triarico started his career at Apulian club Lecce. Triarico made his league and Serie B debut during the 2006–07 Serie B season. He followed the club as they were promoted to Serie A, the top Italian division, and made his Serie A debut during 2007–08 Serie A season.

Triarico was signed by Lega Pro Prima Divisione club Crotone in summer 2008. The club won promotion to the second highest league division of Italy, the Serie B, in 2009.

He remained in the third highest level of Italian football for the 2009–10 season, playing for Taranto. On 9 August 2010 Triarico and Ingrosso were signed by Paganese. In summer 2011 Triarico was signed by Campobasso, from the second division of Italian third highest league.

=== L'Aquila ===
Triarico remained in the fourth highest level of Italian football, playing for L'Aquila in 2012–13 Lega Pro Seconda Divisione season, in a temporary deal. The club won promotion to the 2013–14 Lega Pro Prima Divisione. On 7 August 2013 L'Aquila signed Triarico in a co-ownership deal. L'Aquila acquired Triarico outright by submitting a higher bid to the office of Lega Pro.

=== Matera ===
On 4 August 2018, he joined Serie C club Matera.

=== Bisceglie ===
On 31 January 2019, he signed with Bisceglie.

=== Monopoli ===
On 21 July 2019 he joined Monopoli on a 2-year contract. On 23 September 2020, his Monopoli contract was terminated by mutual consent.

=== Bitonto ===
On 14 October 2020 he joined Bitonto.

=== Brindisi ===
On 21 December 2021 he joined Brindisi.
