= Domenico Aliperta =

Italian footballer (born 1990)

Personal information
- Date of birth: 10 November 1990 (age 36)
- Place of birth: Naples, Italia
- Height: 1.86 m (6 ft 1 in)
- Position: Midfielder

Team information
- Current team: Nocerina
- Number: 8

Youth career
- –2007: Genoa
- 2008–2011: Bari

Senior career*
Years	Team	Apps	(Gls)
2007–2008	Viribus Somma		
2008–2011	Bari	0	(0)
2009	→ Noicattaro (loan)	13	(0)
2010–2011	→ Città di Gela (loan)	17	(0)
2012–2015	Sant'Antonio Abate	14	(3)
2012–2015	HinterReggio	58	(6)
2015	Cavese	12	(0)
2015–2016	Frattese	5	(0)
2016	Agropoli	13	(5)
2016–2017	Nocerina	14	(0)
2017–2018	Team Altamura	29	(6)
2018–2020	Turris	58	(8)
2020–2021	Messina	29	(6)
2021–2022	Arezzo	11	(0)
2022–2023	Cavese	50	(10)
2023–2024	Siracusa	32	(4)
2024–2025	Scafatese	25	(1)
2025–	Nocerina	20	(0)
- * Club domestic league appearances and goals as of 22 Juny 2026

Domenico Aliperta (born 10 November 1990) is an Italian footballer who plays as a midfielder for Serie D club Nocerina.

== Club career ==
On 31 July 2021, he signed with Arezzo.

On 9 December 2021, he joined Serie D club Cavese.
