= Renato Dossena =

Italian footballer (born 1987)

Personal information
- Date of birth: 14 April 1987 (age 39)
- Place of birth: Savona, Italy
- Height: 1.90 m (6 ft 3 in)
- Position: Goalkeeper

Youth career
- –2002: Genoa
- –2006: Empoli

Senior career*
| Years | Team | Apps | (Gls) |
| 2006–2013 | Empoli | 29 | (0) |
| 2006–2008 | → Rovigo (loan) | 54 | (0) |
| 2010–2011 | → Barletta (loan) | 4 | (0) |
| 2011 | → Como (loan) | 1 | (0) |
| 2013–2014 | Venezia | 0 | (0) |
| 2014–2015 | Carpi | 1 | (0) |
| Total | | 89 | (0) |
- * Club domestic league appearances and goals

Renato Dossena (born 14 April 1987) is an Italian former footballer who plays as a goalkeeper.

== Career ==
Born in Savona, Liguria, Dossena started his career with Ligurian club Genoa but was released in 2002; in the 2001–02 season Dossena and Danilo Russo were the two keepers for Genoa's under-15 team. He then spent his youth career at Empoli, Tuscany. He played 17 games (out of a possible 52 games) during the 2004–05 and 2005–06 seasons for Empoli F.C.'s reserve team.

In the 2005–06, he was also promoted to the first team as a backup keeper, and awarded the shirt number 37. He spent two seasons with Serie C2 club Rovigo in the 2006–07 and 2007–08 seasons, and played as a regular starter. Rovigo also signed him in a co-ownership deal in 2007.

In 2008–09 Serie B season, Dossena returned to Empoli and played as the understudy of Davide Bassi, ahead of Gianmarco D'Oria, and then ahead Alberto Pelagotti, in 2009–10 Serie B. In the 2010–11 Serie B season, Empoli loaned Bassi to Torino and sent Dossena to Barletta in another co-ownership deal; Empoli signed Jasmin Handanovič as a replacement and promoted Pelagotti to second choice keeper.

At Barletta, he was the backup of Andrea Tesoniero, ahead of Giuseppe Di Masi. He also played twice in the Coppa Italia Lega Pro.

On 31 January 2011, he was exchanged with defender Giovanni Bruno of Calcio Como; Dossena's co-ownership deal also terminated in favour of Empoli.

On 1 July 2011, he returned to Empoli. Although he was allowed to pick the number 1 shirt, the team's first choice was the fellow youth graduate Pelagotti. On the 30th matchday of the season, however, Dossena became the team's first choice keeper and was the protagonist in the club's victory in the relegation "play-out", which enabled his team to avoid relegation. Dossena only conceded 13 goals in his 14 appearances throughout the season, averaging fewer goals conceded per appearance than Pelagotti.

In the 10th round of 2012–13 Serie B season, Dossena became the understudy of Bassi once again.

On 2 September 2013, Dossena was signed by Venezia in a one-year deal.

On 12 August 2014, Dossena was signed by Carpi F.C. 1909; however, he missed most of the season due to injury.
