= Daniele De Vezze =

Italian footballer (born 1980)

Personal information
- Date of birth: 9 January 1980 (age 46)
- Place of birth: Rome, Italy
- Height: 1.73 m (5 ft 8 in)
- Position: Midfielder

Youth career
- Roma

Senior career*
| Years | Team | Apps | (Gls) |
| 1999–2002 | Roma | 2 | (0) |
| 1999–2000 | → Savoia (loan) | 13 | (0) |
| 2000–2002 | → Palermo (loan) | 3 | (0) |
| 2002 | → Lanciano (loan) | 11 | (1) |
| 2002–2003 | Reggiana | 25 | (2) |
| 2003–2005 | Fiorentina | 0 | (0) |
| 2004 | → Ascoli (loan) | 14 | (0) |
| 2004–2005 | → Reggiana (loan) | 26 | (2) |
| 2005–2006 | Genoa | 33 | (0) |
| 2006–2007 | Messina | 27 | (0) |
| 2007–2008 | Livorno | 27 | (1) |
| 2008–2010 | Bari | 41 | (1) |
| 2010–2011 | Torino | 32 | (3) |
| 2011–2012 | Pergocrema | 10 | (0) |
| 2012 | Benevento | 15 | (0) |
| 2012–2013 | Matera | 8 | (0) |

International career
| 1997 | Italy U17 | 1 | (0) |
| 2000 | Italy U20 | 5 | (1) |
Medal record
Representing Italy
Toulon Tournament
Men's Football
| Bronze medal – third place | 2000 Toulon | Team competition |
- * Club domestic league appearances and goals as of 16:32, 28 May 2013 (UTC)

Daniele De Vezze (born 9 January 1980) is an Italian former footballer who played as a midfielder.

== Club career ==
=== Roma ===
De Vezze began his football career with hometown club Roma. He was part of Primavera U20 youth team and made his Serie A debut on 14 February 1999 in the 3–1 victory against Sampdoria. He replaced Fábio Júnior in the 91st minute. After playing twice for the capital club, he moved on to Serie B outfit Savoia on a loan deal to gain experience.

In 2000–01 season, he was loaned to sister club Palermo of Serie C1, along with Franco Brienza, Attilio Nicodemo and Luca Ferri as Roma President Franco Sensi bought the club in March 2000. He just made 3 appearances at the start of 2000–01 season and in 2001–02 season the loan was extended, joined the club along with Giammarco Frezza and Raffaele Longo. He was awarded no. 85 shirt. In January 2002, he was loaned to Serie C1 side Lanciano.

=== Reggiana & Fiorentina ===
He then joined Serie C1 Reggiana in co-ownership deal for €1 million. That season, Reggiana also signed Fabio Tinazzi for €1million (co-ownership deal) and sent Akande Ajide and Isah Eliakwu to Roma for €1M each (both 50%). He played 25 league matches for the Emilia side. In summer 2003 Fiorentina, at that time at Serie B, bought De Vezze from Reggiana for €300,000, which Roma retained its 50% registration rights on De Vezze. He failed to make a single appearance for the Tuscany side, and joined local rival (and also at Serie B) Ascoli on loan. In the next season, he was loaned to Reggiana. In June 2005, Fiorentina signed him outright.

=== Genoa, Messina & Livorno ===
He then signed by Serie C1 side Genoa, which the team relegated due to Caso Genoa. In July 2006, he was signed by Serie A side Messina, another Sicily team. He played 27 league matches and followed the team relegated. But on 31 August 2007, he joined Serie A struggler Livorno.

=== Bari ===
On 18 June 2008, he was signed by Serie B side Bari, signed a 3-year contract. He won promotion to Serie A, but he was limited to 9 appearances at 2009–10 Serie A season.

=== Torino ===
At the start of 2010–11 season, his no.9 shirt was taken by José Ignacio Castillo and De Vezze had to change to take departed Mariano Donda's no.22.

On 26 August 2010, he left for Serie B side Torino, signed a 1-year contract.

== International career ==
De Vezze was capped for Italy U20 team (feeder team of U21 team) at the 2000 Toulon Tournament. De Vezze formed the midfield line with Manuele Blasi (by-then Roma team-mate), Davide Carrus and Enzo Maresca, scoring the winning goal against Côte d'Ivoire in the third place match.

He also capped once for U17 team, equivalent to current Italy national under-18 football team

== Match-fixing scandal ==
On 16 July 2013 he was suspended for 3 1/2 years for involvement in the fixed match Salernitana–Bari on 23 May 2009.

== Honours ==
Palermo

- Serie C1: 2000–01

Bari

- Serie B: 2008–09
