= Vinícius Dall'Agnol =

Brazilian footballer

Personal information
- Full name: Vinícius Fedrigo Dall'Agnol
- Date of birth: 10 August 1990 (age 36)
- Place of birth: Guaporé, Rio Grande do Sul, Brazil
- Height: 1.92 m (6 ft 3 1/2 in)
- Position: Centre-back

Team information
- Current team: [Energy Saving Futsal]

Youth career
- Gaúcho de Serafina Corrêa
- Encantado
- Internacional
- 2009–2010: São José de Porto Alegre
- 2010: → Parma (loan)

Senior career*
Years	Team	Apps	(Gls)
2010	São José de Porto Alegre	0	(0)
2010–2011	→ Lanciano (loan)	0	(0)
2018	Cisternino (futsal)		
2018–2019	Milano (futsal)		
2019–	Lazio (futsal)		
- * Club domestic league appearances and goals

Vinícius Fedrigo Dall'Agnol (born 10 August 1990) is a Brazilian futsal player and a former footballer who plays for S.S. Lazio Calcio a 5.

== Biography ==
Born in Guaporé, Rio Grande do Sul, Dall'Agnol signed a professional contract with Esporte Clube São José in March 2009. In January 2010 he was loaned to Parma's Primavera youth team. His loan was extended in 2010–11 season and he was sub-loaned to Lanciano. He made his club debut on 20 October 2010, winning Giulianova 4–1 in 2010–11 Coppa Italia Lega Pro. He also played the next cup match.

On 1 July 2011 he returned to Brazil. He immediately entered São José squad for 2011 Copa FGF He played 7 games out of possible 14 Group stage match. The club failed to advance to the next stage.
