= Luca Ferri =

Italian footballer (born 1980)

Personal information
- Date of birth: 19 March 1980 (age 46)
- Place of birth: Rome, Italy
- Height: 1.87 m (6 ft 2 in)
- Position: Centre back

Youth career
- Roma

Senior career*
Years	Team	Apps	(Gls)
1999–2000	Roma	2	(0)
2000	→ Lecco (loan)	10	(1)
2000–2004	Palermo	61	(0)
2003–2004	→ Ascoli (loan)	15	(0)
2004–2006	Teramo	51	(3)
2006–2009	Cisco Roma	57	(5)
2009–2010	Zagarolo		
Total		196	(9)
- * Club domestic league appearances and goals

Luca Ferri (born 19 March 1980) is an Italian former professional footballer who plays as a centre back.

== Career ==
Ferri started his professional career at A.S. Roma. He played his first Serie A match against Juventus on 21 March 1999, replacing Fabio Petruzzi in the 76th minute. The match ended in a 1–1 draw. He also played the next match as Aldair's last minute substitute. He was loaned to Lecco in January 2000, and the club received a 50 million Italian lire development bonus. In the summer of 2000, he was sold to Roma's sister club, Palermo, in a co-ownership deal (i.e. 50% rights), along with Attilio Nicodemo, for 300 million lire.

He won the Serie C1 championship in 2001, and the duo was sold permanently for 5 billion lire (about €2.5 million). Palermo failed to promoted to Serie A in 2003 after 3 points short with the 4th and last promoted team Ancona. He was out favoured by new Palermo owner Maurizio Zamparini (since 2002) and in July 2003 left for league rival Ascoli along with Oscar Brevi. After Palermo won Serie A promotion, Ferri left for Serie C1 side Teramo.

In 2006, he left for Cisco Roma and played 3 seasons. In the 2009–10 season, he left professional football and played for Zagarolo at Eccellenza Lazio (6th level).

== Honours ==
Palermo

- Serie C1: 2001
