= Ahmed Guilouzi =

Tunisian footballer

Personal information
- Full name: Ahmed Ben Hammadi Guilouzi
- Date of birth: 6 March 1987 (age 39)
- Place of birth: Ksar Hellal, Tunisia
- Height: 1.84 m (6 ft 0 in)
- Positions: Centre back; defensive midfielder

Team information
- Current team: Castellarano

Youth career
- 2004–2005: Sassuolo
- 2005–2010: Modena

Senior career*
Years	Team	Apps	(Gls)
2008–2011	Modena	3	(0)
2010–2011	→ Carpi (loan)	5	(0)
2011	Cesena	0	(0)
2011–2013	NK Zagreb	0	(0)
2012	→ HNK Gorica (loan)	12	(0)
2013–2015	Solierese	?	(8)
2016–2018	Rosselli Mutina	?	(13)
2019-	Castellarano	?	(5)

International career
2013–	Tunisia	0	(0)
- * Club domestic league appearances and goals as of 12 March 2020

Ahmed Guilouzi (born 6 March 1987) is a Tunisian footballer who played in Serie B in Italy. Besides Italy, he has played in Croatia.

== Club career ==
Guilouzi made his professional debut for Modena as a second-half substitute in a league match at Vicenza on 28 October 2008.

In August 2010 he was loaned to Carpi.

In the summer of 2011 he moved to Cesena, but soon, in late August, he found himself transferred to the Croatian club NK Zagreb, signing a deal with them until June 2014. Not getting a single cap for the first team in his first four months at the club, he was loaned to HNK Gorica in January 2012 until summer.
