= Varese FC =

Italian association football club

Varese
- Full name: Varese Football Club
- Founded: 22 March 1910; 116 years ago
- Ground: Stadio Franco Ossola
- Capacity: 8,213
- President: Paolo Girardi
- Head coach: Andrea Ciceri
- League: Serie D Group A
- 2025–26: Serie D Group A, 5th of 18
- Website: www.varesefc.com
Home colours	Away colours

Varese Football Club, or simply Varese, is a football club based in Varese, Lombardy, Italy. The club was founded in 2019 as ASD Città di Varese by to informally replace the bankrupt Varese Calcio. Having gradually adopted the identity of Varese football, it is considered the de facto, but not de iure, heir to the club that was founded in 1910 under the name Varese Football Club.

During its various corporate transformations, Varese has participated in the Italian top flight seven times, with their best placement being a seventh-place finish in the 1967–68 Serie A season. Varese have also won three Serie B championships, one Coppa Italia Serie C, and one Coppa Italia Dilettanti.

Since the 2020–21 season (after taking over the title from Busto 81 of Busto Arsizio), Varese has played in Serie D, the fourth tier of the Italian football league system.

== History ==
The club was formed on 22 March 1910, as Varese Football Club, with the goal of promoting football and other open air games. All members, both players and management, paid dues of 1 Lira every month. The club's colours were white and purple and the local market place doubled as the club's first ground. A rope fenced off the pitch from the public, and dressing rooms were improvised in an alley restaurant.

The club played numerous friendly matches before joining any sort of league or organised competition. Early opponents included the "Aurora" of Busto Arsizio, the "Libertas" of Gallarate, the Luino, the Unione Sportiva Milanese, the Ausonia, and Inter. The club took the first steps on the Italian league ladder by entering the Lega Regionale Lombarda in 1914, and the first official championship saw the Varesini playing in their original colours of purple and white silk. The club's American goalkeeper, Sormani, distinguished himself in this first official season as one of Varese's star players.

In May 1915 the war interrupted the season, but by 1919, World War I had ended and life returned to its regular rhythm with a resurgence of interest in football and other recreational activities.

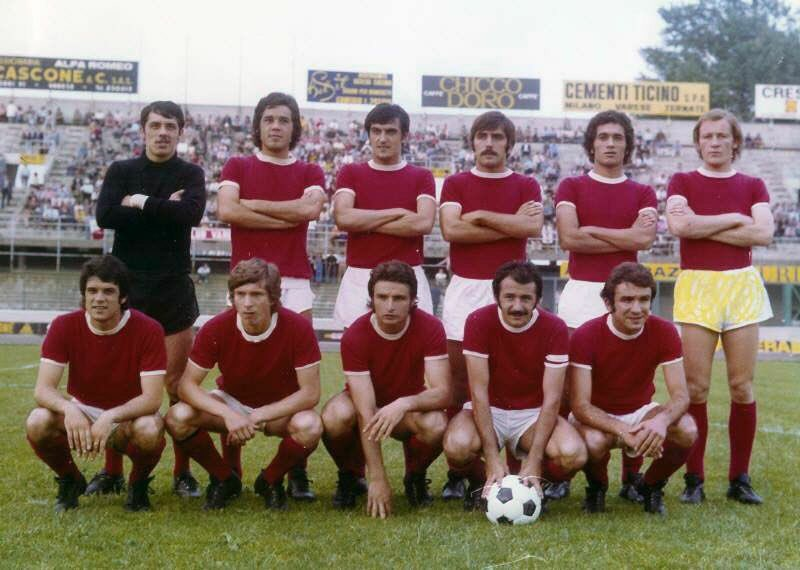
1972–73 Varese with a young Claudio Gentile (standing, second from right)

In 1926–27, the club's colours became white and red ("bianco-rosso"), to match the colours of the city. In the quarter of Masnago, a stadium named Stadio del Littorio was constructed. It was renamed in September 1950 to Stadio Franco Ossola, in honour of a player who had transferred from Varese to Torino Calcio and died in the 1949 Superga air disaster.

Varese, a town not far from Milan, is highly regarded by various athletes who dress "bianco-rosso" (white-red) thanks to Military Territorial Compartments (between the most known players Giuseppe Meazza).

In 1964, with the entrepreneur Giovanni Borghi as president, the Varese achieved a place in Serie A after two consecutive promotions from the Serie C. Among the notable players who have worn the white and red shirt are Pietro Anastasi, Roberto Bettega, and the World Cup winners Claudio Gentile, Giampiero Marini and Riccardo Sogliano. After a decade in the top-flight, the golden era of Varese ended with relegation in 1975.

From 1975 to 1985 the club played in Second Division Serie B but one year in Third one, during season 1979–80. Relegated the previous season the club regained immediately its place in Serie B.

Since further relegation in 1985, the club had not succeeded in returning to Serie B: 10 of the next 20 seasons were spent in C2, where the club were readmitted after promotion from Campionato Nazionale Dilettanti in 1994.

The club returned to the C1 Series within four years thanks to the work of general manager Stefano Capozucca, brought to Varese by the entrepreneur Claudio Milanese, who was then co-owner of the club with the President, Paolo Binda, and other lesser associates.

In 2001, after financial conflicts between entrepreneur Gianvittorio Gandolfi and sponsors SiViaggi and CIT, the Turri family arrived at the club, bringing a series of innovations. In the summer of 2004, under the Turri-Tacconi co-presidency, economic and financial ruin made the club sink to its lowest ebb.

=== AS Varese 1910 ===
In July 2004, the bankrupt Varese Football Club was reformed under a new board, and called A.S. Varese 1910. The club was forced to start afresh in the Eccellenza league. The Sogliano family took control of the team, with Riccardo Sogliano assuming overall control. The former player of Varese and A.C. Milan, has experience controlling clubs in Serie A: Parma F.C. and the Genoa C.F.C.

In its first season the new board suffered from delay and inexperience, and promotion to Serie D was missed narrowly due to points dropped early on in the season to the club's eventual title-rivals. Club President Peo Maroso and general manager Luca Sogliano, son of Riccardo and also a former player, decided to install a new first-team coach from within. Devis Mangia, at just 32 years of age, was the youngest head coach of the division and, probably, the entire league.

The club has also had problems with its supporters (in particular a supporters group named "Blood and Honour") who treated black players badly. It happened in spring of 2002 with French players, Mohamed Benhassen, Samir Benhassen and the Cameroonian goalkeeper, Andrè Joel Eboué. They were at the stadium every weekend and often fight with rival supporters.

In season 2005/2006, Varese won the Serie D/A league, thus gaining promotion to Serie C2, three matches before the end of the season.

In season 2008/2009, they won Lega Pro Seconda Divisione, and were promoted to Lega Pro Prima Divisione, the third level of Italian football system. Varese finished second in Girone (Group) A of League Pro Prima Divisione and qualified for promotion play-offs at next season. Varese defeated Benevento in semi-final and Cremonese in final and returned to Serie B after 25 years of absence with making second consecutive promotion.

At the end of season 2011/12, A.S. Varese achieved fifth place in Serie B, qualifying for the play-offs for promotion into Serie A. Drawn against Hellas Verona they won 3–1 on aggregate to qualify for the two-legged final against Sampdoria. Although a narrow 3–2 defeat in the initial leg in Genova held the promise to be a useful result for Varese, their rivals scored the only goal in the home leg, giving Sampdoria a 4–2 aggregate victory and denying Varese the promotion.

=== SSD Varese Calcio ===
After their relegation from Serie B in the 2014–15 season, Varese 1910 failed to meet the deadline to register for Lega Pro and the club declared bankruptcy. The club would be reformed to play again in Eccellenza for the 2015–16 season as Varese Calcio SSD. After winning its group, it played in Serie D and reached the play-off stage. In the 2017–18 season, Varese Calcio started without a president and, in November, manager Salvatore Iacolino resigned due to the club's financial crisis. The team finished the season in 18th and was relegated to the Eccellenza. On 14 July 2019, the club was dissolved due to financial issues.

=== ASD Città di Varese ===
ASD Città di Varese, a club also based in Varese, was established by three football fans from Varese – Stefano Pertile, Stefano Amirante and Cesare Bonazzi – on 26 July 2019, with the purpose to "keep alive" Varese's name in the Italian football league system, following the dissolution of Varese Calcio. As a matter of fact, Città di Varese adopted the historic colours of the football club founded in 1910 (red and white), but never openly claimed any inheritance of the ceased team.

In its maiden season, coached by Stefano Iori, Città di Varese won the 2019–20 Terza Categoria Varese Group B, the lowest tier of the Italian football pyramid. On 16 July 2020, prior to the 2020–21 season, the club merged with Busto 81 (a club based in Busto Arsizio, no longer interested in pursuing the football activity) and obtained the right to participate in the Serie D Group A, Italy's fourth division.

=== Return to Varese FC ===
On 23 May 2025, the club formally reverted to its historic name, Varese Football Club, moving away from its previous designation, Città di Varese SRL.

== Players ==
=== Current squad ===
As of 4 February 2026

Note: Flags indicate national team as defined under FIFA eligibility rules; some limited exceptions apply. Players may hold more than one non-FIFA nationality.

No.	Pos.	Nation	Player
—	GK	ROU	Gabriel Bugli
—	GK	ITA	Leonardo Taina
—	DF	ITA	Manuel Costante
—	DF	ITA	Matteo Bruzzone
—	DF	ITA	Federico Bertoni
—	DF	ITA	Giuseppe Secondo
—	DF	ITA	Pietro Marangon
—	DF	ITA	Umberto Agnelli
—	DF	ITA	Vittorio Salera
—	MF	ITA	Orso Maria De Ponti
—	MF	ITA	Andrea Malinverno

No.	Pos.	Nation	Player
—	MF	ITA	Andrea Sassudelli
—	MF	FRA	Abraham Sovogui
—	MF	ITA	Luca Palesi
—	MF	ITA	Tommaso Tentoni
—	MF	ITA	Filippo Guerini
—	MF	ITA	Lorenzo Berbenni
—	FW	ITA	Pietro Cogliati
—	FW	ALB	Frenci Qeros
—	FW	ITA	Niccolò Romero
—	FW	ITA	Matteo Barzotti
—	FW	ITA	Riccardo Pliscovaz

== Honours ==
- Serie B
  - Winners: 1963–64, 1969–70, 1973–74
- Serie C1
  - Winners: 1942–43, 1979–80
- Serie C2
  - Winners: 1989–90, 1997–98, 2008–09
- Coppa Italia Serie C
  - Winners: 1994–95
- Coppa Italia Dilettanti
  - Winners: 1993–94
- Terza Categoria Varese (Level 9)
  - Winners (1): 2019–20 (Group B)
