= 2014–15 Coppa Italia =

TIM Cup
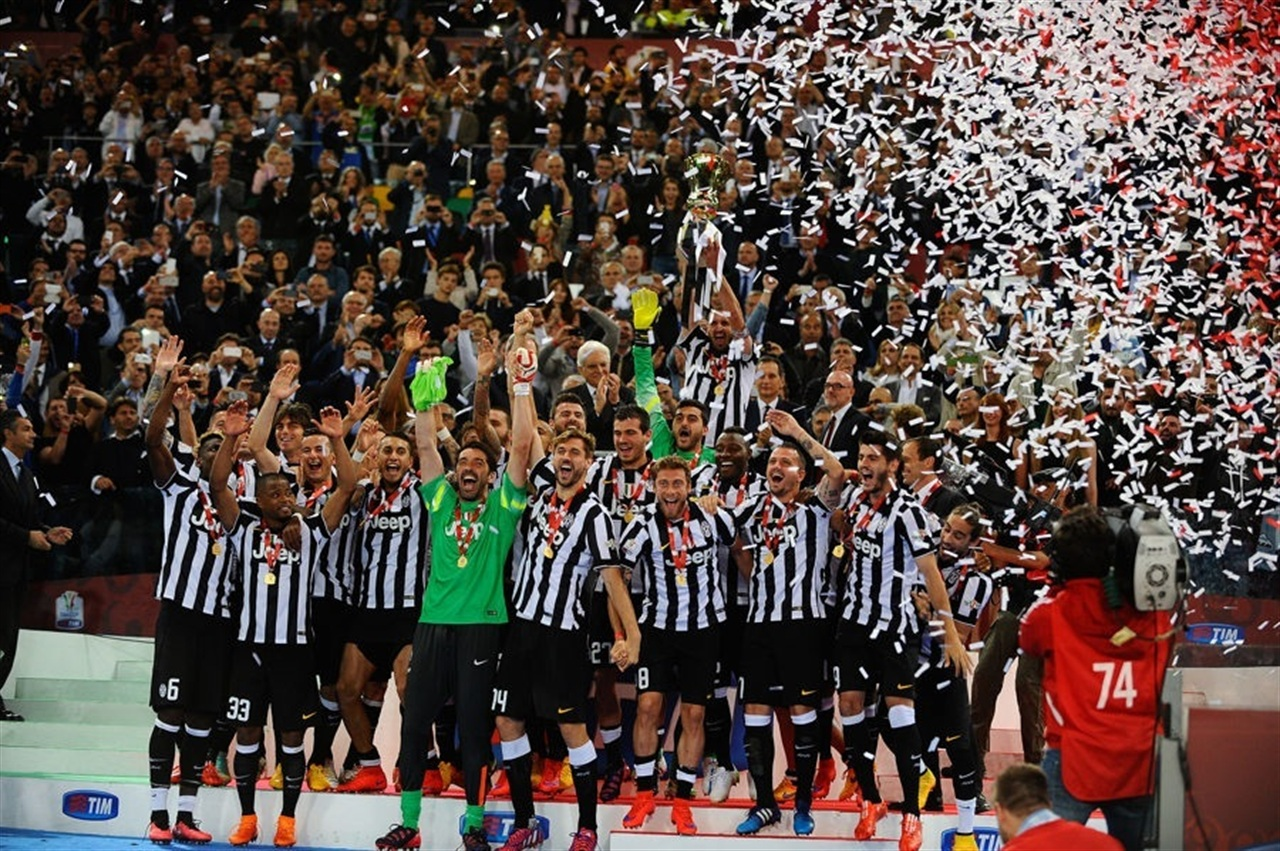

Tournament details
- Country: Italy
- Dates: 10 August 2014 – 20 May 2015
- Teams: 78

Final positions
- Champions: Juventus (10th title)
- Runners-up: Lazio

Tournament statistics
- Matches played: 79
- Goals scored: 224 (2.84 per match)
- Top goal scorer(s): Antonio Di Natale; Mario Gómez (4 goals)

The 2014–15 Coppa Italia, also known as TIM Cup for sponsorship reasons, was the 68th edition of the national domestic tournament. Napoli were the defending champions, having won the previous year's final, but were eliminated in the semi-finals by Lazio. Juventus emerged victorious with a 2–1 win in extra time, earning a record-breaking tenth title.

== Participating teams ==
=== Lega Calcio ===
==== Serie A (20 teams) ====
- Atalanta
- Cagliari
- Cesena
- Chievo
- Empoli
- Fiorentina
- Genoa
- Hellas Verona
- Internazionale
- Juventus
- Lazio
- Milan
- Napoli
- Palermo
- Parma
- Roma
- Sampdoria
- Sassuolo
- Torino
- Udinese

==== Serie B (22 teams) ====
- Avellino
- Bari
- Bologna
- Brescia
- Carpi
- Catania
- Cittadella
- Crotone
- Frosinone
- Latina
- Livorno
- Modena
- Perugia
- Pescara
- Pro Vercelli
- Spezia
- Ternana
- Trapani
- Varese
- Vicenza
- Virtus Entella
- Virtus Lanciano

==== Lega Pro (27 teams) ====
- AlbinoLeffe
- Alessandria
- Bassano Virtus
- Benevento
- Casertana
- Catanzaro
- Como
- Cosenza
- Cremonese
- FeralpiSalò
- Juve Stabia
- L'Aquila
- Lecce
- Messina
- Monza
- Novara
- Pisa
- Pontedera
- Prato
- Reggina
- Renate
- Salernitana
- Santarcangelo
- Savona
- Südtirol
- Teramo
- Venezia

==== Serie D (9 teams) ====
- Akragas
- AltoVicentino
- Correggese
- Foligno
- Matelica
- Olginatese
- RapalloBogliasco
- Taranto
- Terracina

== Format and seeding ==
Teams enter the competition at various stages, as follows:

- First phase (one-legged fixtures)
  - First round: 36 teams from Lega Pro and Serie D start the tournament
  - Second round: the 18 winners from the previous round are joined by the 22 Serie B teams
  - Third round: the 20 winners from the second round meet the 12 Serie A sides seeded 9-20
  - Fourth round: the 16 survivors face each other
- Second phase
  - Round of 16 (one-legged): the 8 fourth round winners are inserted into a bracket with the Serie A clubs seeded 1-8
  - Quarter-finals (one-legged)
  - Semi-finals (two-legged)
- Final (one-legged) at the Stadio Olimpico in Rome

== First round ==
First round matches were played on 10 August 2014.

10 August 2014	AlbinoLeffe (3)	0–1	Renate (3)	Bergamo
			Adobati 80'	Stadium: Stadio Atleti Azzurri d'Italia; Referee: Luca Candeo

10 August 2014	Pontedera (3)	3–1	Messina (3)	Pontedera
	Grassi 39', 65' (pen.); Luperini 63'		Pepe 23'	Stadium: Stadio Ettore Mannucci; Referee: Francesco Guccini

10 August 2014	Vicenza (2)	1–2	Bassano Virtus (3)	Vicenza
	Maritato 8'		Cattaneo 75'; Stevanin 90'	Stadium: Stadio Romeo Menti; Referee: Enzo Vesprini

10 August 2014	Juve Stabia (3)	1–0	Prato (3)	Castellammare di Stabia
	Ripa 77' (pen.)			Stadium: Stadio Romeo Menti; Referee: Andrea Morreale

10 August 2014	Como (3)	5–0	Matelica Calcio (4)	Como
	Fietta 20', 42'; Le Noci 45+3', 51' (pen.); Defendi 65'			Stadium: Stadio Giuseppe Sinigaglia; Referee: Andrea Capone

10 August 2014	Catanzaro (3)	2–0	Akragas (4)	Catanzaro
	Martignago 26'; Reis 71'			Stadium: Stadio Nicola Ceravolo; Referee: Pasquale Boggi

10 August 2014	Reggina (3)	0–1	Casertana (3)	Reggio Calabria
			Cruciani 47'	Stadium: Stadio Oreste Granillo; Referee: Salvatore Guarino

10 August 2014	Alessandria (3)	1–0	Salernitana (3)	Salerno
	Mezavilla 8'			Stadium: Stadio Arechi; Referee: Livio Marinelli

10 August 2014	L'Aquila (3)	2–1 (a.e.t.)	AltoVicentino (4)	L'Aquila
	Perna 14'; Del Pinto 105'		Roveretto 45+1'	Stadium: Stadio Tommaso Fattori; Referee: Vincenzo Fiorini

10 August 2014	Pisa (3)	4–0	RapalloBogliasco (4)	Pisa
	Stanco 12', 71'; Frediani 74'; Napoli 88'			Stadium: Arena Garibaldi – Stadio Romeo Anconetani; Referee: Alfonso D'Apice

10 August 2014	Savona (3)	6–0	Terracina Calcio (4)	Savona
	Sanna 37'; De Martis 53', 66'; Cerone 82' (pen.); Carta 84'; Spadafora 89'			Stadium: Stadio Valerio Bacigalupo; Referee: Federico Sassoli

10 August 2014	Cremonese (3)	3–2	Cosenza Calcio (3)	Cremona
	Kirilov 7', 63'; Jadid 12'		Mosciaro 35' (pen.); Calderini 59'	Stadium: Stadio Giovanni Zini; Referee: Luigi Rossi

10 August 2014	FeralpiSalò (3)	1–0	Santarcangelo (3)	Salò
	Gulin 90+1'			Stadium: Stadio Lino Turina; Referee: Antonio Giua

10 August 2014	Lecce (3)	5–0	Foligno (4)	Lecce
	Rosafio 15'; Papini 43'; Miccoli 52', 58'; Moscardelli 71' (pen.)			Stadium: Stadio Via del Mare; Referee: Edoardo Paolini

10 August 2014	Südtirol (3)	3–2	Teramo (3)	Bolzano
	Fink 32'; Fischnaller 85', 88'		Lapadula 66', 90+2'	Stadium: Stadio Druso; Referee: Daniele Rasia

10 August 2014	Monza (3)	2–1	Olginatese (4)	Monza
	Anastasi 30'; Radrezza 85'		Merlo 62'	Stadium: Stadio Brianteo; Referee: Alessandro Pietropaolo

10 August 2014	Benevento (3)	2–0	Correggese (4)	Benevento
	Doninelli 67'; Padella 90'			Stadium: Stadio Ciro Vigorito; Referee: Daniele Viotti

10 August 2014	Venezia (3)	5–1	Taranto (4)	Venice
	Carcuro 14'; Franchini 32'; Bellazzini 45+2', 47' (pen.); Siega 61'		Genchi 30'	Stadium: Stadio Pier Luigi Penzo; Referee: Pierantonio Perotti

== Second round ==
Second round matches were played on 16 & 17 August 2014.

16 August 2014	Cittadella (2)	2–1	Pontedera (3)	Cittadella
19:30	Gerardi 28'; Sgrigna 55'		Madrigali 37'	Stadium: Stadio Pier Cesare Tombolato; Referee: Michael Fabbri

16 August 2014	Virtus Entella (2)	2–2 (5–4 p)	Benevento (3)	Chiavari
	Mazzarani 2'; Moreo 37'		Doninelli 28'; Marotta 90+3'	Stadium: Stadio comunale Referee: Riccardo Pinzani
	Penalties
	Troiano (penalty scored); César (penalty scored); Latour (penalty scored); Russo (penalty missed); Costa Ferreira (penalty missed); Malele (penalty scored); Botta (penalty scored)		Doninelli (penalty scored); Lucioni (penalty missed); Melara (penalty scored); Som (penalty missed); Marotta (penalty scored); Celjak (penalty scored); Montini (penalty missed)

16 August 2014	Spezia (2)	1–0	Lecce (3)	La Spezia
	De Col 86'			Stadium: Stadio Alberto Picco; Referee: Claudio Gavillucci

16 August 2014	Modena (2)	0–0 (3–2 p)	Monza (3)	Modena
				Stadium: Stadio Alberto Braglia; Referee: Fabio Maresca
	Penalties
	Schiavone (penalty scored); Acosty (penalty scored); Granoche (penalty scored); Gatto (penalty missed)		Burrai (penalty scored); Beduschi (penalty scored); Perini (penalty missed); Massoni (penalty missed); Radrezza (penalty missed)

17 August 2014	Pescara (2)	1–1 (a.e.t.) (5–4 p)	Renate (3)	Pescara
	Caprari 3'		Florian 47'	Stadium: Stadio Adriatico; Referee: Ivano Pezzuto
	Penalties
	Politano (penalty scored); Maniero (penalty missed); Caprari (penalty missed); Appelt (penalty scored); Lazzari (penalty scored); Pucino (penalty scored); Dettori (penalty scored)		Gualdi (penalty scored); Rovelli (penalty missed); Scaccabarozzi (penalty scored); Bonfanti (penalty scored); Spampatti (penalty missed); Muchetti (penalty scored); Morotti (penalty missed)

17 August 2014	Livorno (2)	2–4	Bassano (3)	Livorno
	Galabinov 15'; Moscati 41'		Maistrello 26'; Iocolano 35' (pen.); Priola 87'; Stevanin 90+1'	Stadium: Stadio Armando Picchi; Attendance: 2300; Referee: Gianluca Manganiello

17 August 2014	Varese (2)	3–2	Juve Stabia (3)	Varese
	Lupoli 21', 59'; Leonidas 53'		Jidayi 57'; Migliorini 90+2'	Stadium: Stadio Franco Ossola; Referee: Davide Ghersini

17 August 2014	Frosinone (2)	0–0 (a.e.t.) (1–3 p)	Como (3)	Frosinone
				Stadium: Stadio Matusa; Referee: Fabrizio Pasqua
	Penalties
	Frara (penalty missed); Curiale (penalty missed); Ciofani (penalty scored); Crivello (penalty missed)		Le Noci (penalty scored); Defendi (penalty missed); Casoli (penalty missed); Ambrosini (penalty scored); Fietta (penalty scored)

17 August 2014	Brescia (2)	2–1	Pro Vercelli (2)	Brescia
	Caracciolo 24', 90+5'		Emmanuello 26'	Stadium: Stadio Mario Rigamonti; Referee: Daniele Chiffi

17 August 2014	Latina (2)	1–1 (a.e.t.) (4–3 p)	Novara Calcio (3)	Latina
	Pettinari 26'		Corazza 78'	Stadium: Stadio Domenico Francioni; Referee: Federico La Penna
	Penalties
	Viviani (penalty scored); Petagna (penalty scored); Pettinari (penalty scored); Valiani (penalty missed); Cottafava (penalty scored)		Gonzalez (penalty missed); Gustavo (penalty missed); Corazza (penalty scored); Faragò (penalty scored); Garufo (penalty scored)

17 August 2014	Ternana (2)	2–1	Catanzaro (3)	Terni
	Avenatti 22', 26'		Pagano 90'	Stadium: Stadio Libero Liberati; Attendance: 2401; Referee: Rosario Abisso

17 August 2014	Crotone (2)	0–0 (a.e.t.) (3–4 p)	Casertana (3)	Crotone
				Stadium: Stadio Ezio Scida; Referee: Gianluca Aureliano
	Penalties
	Suciu (penalty scored); Ricci (penalty scored); Ferrari (penalty scored); Salzano (penalty missed); Torregrossa (penalty missed)		Carrus (penalty scored); Bianco (penalty scored); D'Alterio (penalty missed); Alessandro (penalty scored); Chiavazzo (penalty scored)

17 August 2014	Lanciano (2)	1–0	Alessandria (3)	Lanciano
	Thiam 39'			Stadium: Stadio Guido Biondi; Referee: Filippo Merchiori

17 August 2014	Bologna (2)	1–2 (a.e.t.)	L'Aquila (3)	Bologna
	Giannone 70'		Perna 14'; De Sousa 103'	Stadium: Stadio Renato Dall'Ara; Referee: Daniele Minelli

17 August 2014	Pisa (3)	2–1	Carpi (2)	Pisa
	Arma 49'; Giovinco 82'		Concas 54'	Stadium: Arena Garibaldi – Stadio Romeo Anconetani; Referee: Riccardo Ros

17 August 2014	Bari (2)	2–1	Savona (3)	Bari
	Galeano 4'; De Luca 68'		Sanna 60'	Stadium: Stadio San Nicola; Referee: Juan Luca Sacchi

17 August 2014	Avellino (2)	2–0	Venezia (3)	Avellino
	Arrighini 34'; Schiavon 36'			Stadium: Stadio Partenio-Adriano Lombardi; Referee: Luigi Nasca

17 August 2014	Trapani (2)	1–2	Cremonese (3)	Trapani
	Barillà 90+5'		Kirilov 3'; Brighenti 42'	Stadium: Stadio Polisportivo Provinciale; Referee: Maurizio Mariani

17 August 2014	Perugia (2)	2–0	FeralpiSalò (3)	Perugia
	Taddei 78'; Falcinelli 90+3'			Stadium: Stadio Renato Curi; Referee: Leonardo Baracani

17 August 2014	Catania (2)	1–0	Südtirol (3)	Catania
	Martinho 23'			Stadium: Stadio Angelo Massimino; Attendance: 6000; Referee: Francesco Paolo Saia

== Third round ==
Third round matches were played on 21, 22, 23 and 24 August 2014.

21 August 2014	Sassuolo (1)	4–1	Cittadella (2)	Reggio Emilia
	Zaza 12'; Sansone 53', 83'; Floro Flores 90+3'		Coralli 33'	Stadium: Mapei Stadium – Città del Tricolore; Referee: Gianluca Rocchi

22 August 2014	Pescara (2)	1–0	Chievo (1)	Pescara
	Maniero 38'			Stadium: Stadio Adriatico - Giovanni Cornacchia; Referee: Antonio Damato

23 August 2014	Atalanta (1)	2–0	Pisa (3)	Bergamo
	Cigarini 9'; Spinazzola 81'			Stadium: Stadio Atleti Azzurri d'Italia; Referee: Aleandro Di Paolo

23 August 2014	Varese (2)	1–0	Virtus Entella (2)	Varese
	Leonidas 90'			Stadium: Stadio Franco Ossola; Referee: Paolo Silvio Mazzoleni

23 August 2014	Palermo (1)	0–3	Modena (2)	Palermo
			Ferrari 6'; Beltrame 42'; Schiavone 88'	Stadium: Stadio Renzo Barbera; Referee: Marco Guida

23 August 2014	Cagliari (1)	2–0	Catania (2)	Quartu Sant'Elena
	Sau 5'; Farias 18'			Stadium: Stadio Is Arenas; Referee: Andrea Gervasoni

23 August 2014	Bari (2)	1–2	Avellino (2)	Bari
	Ligi 45+1'		Comi 58'; Pozzebon 83'	Stadium: Stadio San Nicola; Referee: Angelo Cervellera

23 August 2014	Perugia (2)	2–1 (a.e.t.)	Spezia (2)	Perugia
	Rabušic 87'; Parigini 93'		Ebagua 26'	Stadium: Stadio Renato Curi; Referee: Carmine Russo

24 August 2014	Virtus Lanciano (2)	0–1	Genoa (1)	Lanciano
			Pinilla 31' (pen.)	Stadium: Stadio Guido Biondi; Referee: Daniele Doveri

24 August 2014	Brescia (2)	1–0	Latina (2)	Brescia
	Caracciolo 88'			Stadium: Stadio Mario Rigamonti; Referee: Davide Massa

24 August 2014	Lazio (1)	7–0	Bassano Virtus (3)	Rome
	Candreva 46'; Keita 53', 69'; De Vrij 59'; Parolo 80'; Basta 88'; Klose 90+3'	Report		Stadium: Stadio Olimpico; Referee: Marco Di Bello

24 August 2014	Hellas Verona (1)	3–0	Cremonese (3)	Verona
	Toni 50'; Moras 61'; Christodoulopoulos 67'			Stadium: Stadio Marc'Antonio Bentegodi; Referee: Dino Tommasi

24 August 2014	Cesena (1)	1–0	Casertana (3)	Cesena
	Marilungo 35'			Stadium: Stadio Dino Manuzzi; Referee: Eugenio Abbattista

24 August 2014	Empoli (1)	3–0	L'Aquila (3)	Empoli
	Tavano 11', 19', 80'			Stadium: Stadio Carlo Castellani; Referee: Diego Roca

24 August 2014	Sampdoria (1)	4–1	Como (3)	Genova
	Éder 7', 56', 73'; Gabbiadini 13'		Le Noci 33'	Stadium: Stadio Luigi Ferraris; Referee: Luca Pairetto

24 August 2014	Udinese (1)	5–1	Ternana (2)	Udine
	Di Natale 19', 29', 43', 75'; Théréau 81' (pen.)		Ceravolo 34'	Stadium: Stadio Friuli; Referee: Sebastiano Peruzzo

== Fourth round ==
Fourth round matches were played on 2, 3 and 4 December 2014.

2 December 2014	Lazio (1)	3–0	Varese (2)	Rome
	Simić 24' (o.g.); Đorđević 26'; Felipe Anderson 80'			Stadium: Stadio Olimpico; Referee: Luigi Nasca

2 December 2014	Sassuolo (1)	1–0	Pescara (2)	Reggio Emilia
	Floro Flores 57'			Stadium: Stadio Città del Tricolore; Referee: Renzo Candussio

2 December 2014	Hellas Verona (1)	1–0	Perugia (2)	Verona
	Saviola 17'			Stadium: Stadio Marcantonio Bentegodi; Referee: Angelo Cervellera

3 December 2014	Atalanta (1)	2–0	Avellino (2)	Bergamo
	Boakye 14', 19'			Stadium: Stadio Atleti Azzurri d'Italia; Referee: Daniele Minelli

3 December 2014	Empoli (1)	2–0	Genoa (1)	Empoli
	Laxalt 5'; Mchedlidze 73'			Stadium: Stadio Carlo Castellani; Referee: Marco Di Bello

3 December 2014	Udinese (1)	4–2 (a.e.t.)	Cesena (1)	Udine
	Allan 20'; Fernandes 44'; Evangelista 100'; Théréau 113'		Đurić 4'; Succi 55'	Stadium: Stadio Friuli; Referee: Dino Tommasi

4 December 2014	Cagliari (1)	4–4 (a.e.t.) (5–4 p)	Modena (2)	Cagliari
	Conti 59' (pen.); Longo 90+3', 100'; Farias 119'		Cragno 6' (o.g.); Luppi 68'; Granoche 98', 109' (pen.)	Stadium: Stadio Sant'Elia; Referee: Aleandro Di Paolo
	Penalties
	Conti (penalty missed); Rossettini (penalty scored); Farias (penalty scored); João Pedro (penalty scored); Crisetig (penalty missed); Longo (penalty scored); Murru (penalty scored)		(penalty scored) Schiavone; (penalty scored) Nizzetto; (penalty scored) Granoche; (penalty missed) Gatto; (penalty missed) Osuji; (penalty scored) Marzorati; (penalty missed) Cionek

4 December 2014	Sampdoria (1)	2–0	Brescia (2)	Genoa
	Gabbiadini 33' (pen.); Bergessio 58'			Stadium: Stadio Luigi Ferraris; Referee: Leonardo Baracani

== Final stage ==
=== Bracket ===
Round of 16
Milan	2
Sassuolo	1
Torino	1
Lazio	3
Napoli (pen.)	2 (5)
Udinese	2 (4)
Internazionale	2
Sampdoria	0
Parma	2
Cagliari	1
Juventus	6
Hellas Verona	1
Roma (aet)	2
Empoli	1
Fiorentina	3
1	Atalanta	1

Quarter-finals
Milan	0
Lazio	1
Napoli	1
Internazionale	0
Parma	0
Juventus	1
Roma	0
Fiorentina	2

Semi-finals
Lazio	1	1	2
Napoli	1	0	1
Juventus	1	3	4
Fiorentina	2	0	2

Final
Lazio	1
Juventus (aet)	2

==== Round of 16 ====
Round of 16 were played on 13, 14, 15, 20, 21 and 22 January 2015.

13 January 2015	Milan (1)	2–1	Sassuolo (1)	Milan
21:00	Pazzini 38'; De Jong 86'	Report	Sansone 64' (pen.)	Stadium: San Siro; Referee: Dino Tommasi

14 January 2015	Parma (1)	2–1	Cagliari (1)	Parma
18:00	Paletta 45'; Rispoli 84'	Report	Sau 69'	Stadium: Stadio Ennio Tardini; Referee: Angelo Cervellera

14 January 2015	Torino (1)	1–3	Lazio (1)	Turin
21:00	Martínez 49'	Report	Keita 13'; Klose 29'; Ledesma 57' (pen.)	Stadium: Stadio Olimpico; Referee: Carmine Russo

15 January 2015	Juventus (1)	6–1	Hellas Verona (1)	Turin
21:00	Giovinco 6', 45+1'; Pereyra 21'; Pogba 53'; Morata 63' (pen.); Coman 78'	Report	Nenê 57'	Stadium: Juventus Stadium; Referee: Giampaolo Calvarese

20 January 2015	Roma (1)	2–1 (a.e.t.)	Empoli (1)	Rome
21:00	Iturbe 5'; De Rossi 114' (pen.)	Report	Verdi 79'	Stadium: Stadio Olimpico; Referee: Marco Di Bello

21 January 2015	Fiorentina (1)	3–1	Atalanta (1)	Florence
18:00	Gómez 6', 28'; Cuadrado 11' (pen.)	Report	Bianchi 40'	Stadium: Stadio Artemio Franchi; Referee: Paolo Valeri

21 January 2015	Internazionale (1)	2–0	Sampdoria (1)	Milan
21:00	Shaqiri 71'; Icardi 87'	Report		Stadium: San Siro; Referee: Paolo Tagliavento

22 January 2015	Napoli (1)	2–2 (a.e.t.) (5–4 p)	Udinese (1)	Naples
21:00	Jorginho 65' (pen.); Hamšík 99'	Report	Théréau 58'; Kone 104'	Stadium: Stadio San Paolo; Referee: Daniele Orsato
	Penalties
	De Guzmán (penalty scored); Jorginho (penalty scored); Mesto (penalty scored); Hamšík (penalty scored); Higuaín (penalty scored)		(penalty scored) Fernandes; (penalty scored) Guilherme; (penalty scored) Kone; (penalty scored) Danilo; (penalty missed) Allan

==== Quarter-finals ====
Quarter-finals were played on 27, 28 January, 3 and 4 February 2015.

27 January 2015	Milan (1)	0–1	Lazio (1)	Milan
20:45		Report	Biglia 38' (pen.)	Stadium: San Siro; Referee: Gianluca Rocchi

28 January 2015	Parma (1)	0–1	Juventus (1)	Parma
20:45		Report	Morata 89'	Stadium: Stadio Ennio Tardini; Referee: Sebastiano Peruzzo

3 February 2015	Roma (1)	0–2	Fiorentina (1)	Rome
20:45		Report	Gómez 65', 89'	Stadium: Stadio Olimpico; Referee: Antonio Damato

4 February 2015	Napoli (1)	1–0	Internazionale (1)	Naples
20:45	Higuaín 90+3'			Stadium: Stadio San Paolo; Referee: Davide Massa

==== Semi-finals ====
Semi-finals were played on 4–5 March & 7–8 April 2015.

===== First leg =====
4 March 2015	Lazio (1)	1–1	Napoli (1)	Rome
20:45	Klose 33'	Report	Gabbiadini 58'	Stadium: Stadio Olimpico; Attendance: 27,000; Referee: Antonio Damato

5 March 2015	Juventus (1)	1–2	Fiorentina (1)	Turin
20:45	Llorente 24'	Report	Salah 11', 56'	Stadium: Juventus Stadium; Attendance: 40,211; Referee: Paolo Valeri

===== Second leg =====
7 April 2015	Fiorentina (1)	0–3 (2–4 agg.)	Juventus (1)	Florence
20:45		Report	Matri 21'; Pereyra 44'; Bonucci 59'	Stadium: Stadio Artemio Franchi; Referee: Davide Massa

8 April 2015	Napoli (1)	0–1 (1–2 agg.)	Lazio (1)	Naples
20:45			Lulić 79'	Stadium: Stadio San Paolo

== Final ==
20 May 2015
20:45 CEST (UTC+2)

Juventus	2–1 (a.e.t.)	Lazio
Chiellini 11'; Matri 97'	Report	Radu 4'

Stadio Olimpico, Rome
Attendance: 60,000
Referee: Daniele Orsato

== Top goalscorers ==
Rank	Player	Club	Goals
1	(Italy) Antonio Di Natale	Udinese	4
1	(Germany) Mario Gómez	Fiorentina	4
3	(Germany) Miroslav Klose	Lazio	3
3	(Senegal) Keita Baldé	Lazio	3
3	(Italy) Giuseppe Le Noci	Como	3
3	(Bulgaria) Radoslav Kirilov	Cremonese	3
3	(France) Cyril Théréau	Udinese	3
3	(Italy) Manolo Gabbiadini	Sampdoria	3
3	(Brazil) Éder	Sampdoria	3
3	(Italy) Nicola Sansone	Sassuolo	3
