= 2011–12 Coppa Italia =

TIM Cup

Tournament details
- Country: Italy
- Dates: 7 Aug 2011 – 20 May 2012
- Teams: 78

Final positions
- Champions: Napoli (4th title)
- Runners-up: Juventus

Tournament statistics
- Matches played: 79
- Goals scored: 228 (2.89 per match)
- Top goal scorer: Edinson Cavani (5 goals)

The 2011–12 Coppa Italia, also known as TIM Cup for sponsorship reasons, was the 65th edition of the domestic competition. As in the previous year, 78 clubs took part in the tournament. Internazionale were the cup holders. Napoli were the winners, thus qualifying for the group stage of the 2012–13 UEFA Europa League.

== Participating teams ==
Serie A (20 teams)

- Atalanta (third round)
- Bologna (round of 16)
- Cagliari (fourth round)
- Catania (fourth round)
- Cesena (round of 16)
- Chievo (quarter-finals)
- Fiorentina (round of 16)
- Genoa (round of 16)
- Internazionale (quarter-finals)
- Juventus (final)
- Lazio (quarter-finals)
- Lecce (third round)
- Milan (semi-finals)
- Napoli (champion)
- Novara (round of 16)
- Palermo (round of 16)
- Parma (fourth round)
- Roma (quarter-finals)
- Siena (semi-finals)
- Udinese (round of 16)

Serie B (22 teams)

- AlbinoLeffe (third round)
- Ascoli (third round)
- Bari (fourth round)
- Brescia (third round)
- Cittadella (third round)
- Crotone (fourth round)
- Empoli (fourth round)
- Grosseto (third round)
- Gubbio (fourth round)
- Juve Stabia (second round)
- Livorno (third round)
- Modena (fourth round)
- Nocerina (third round)
- Padova (third round)
- Pescara (second round)
- Reggina (third round)
- Sampdoria (third round)
- Sassuolo (third round)
- Torino (third round)
- Varese (second round)
- Hellas Verona (round of 16)
- Vicenza (second round)

Lega Pro (27 teams)

- Alessandria (second round)
- Avellino (third round)
- Barletta (first round)
- Benevento (second round)
- Carpi (second round)
- Carrarese (second round)
- Como (first round)
- FeralpiSalò (first round)
- Foggia (second round)
- Frosinone (second round)
- L'Aquila (second round)
- Latina (first round)
- Lumezzane (second round)
- Piacenza (second round)
- Pisa (second round)
- Portogruaro (first round)
- Prato (second round)
- Pro Patria (first round)
- Reggiana (first round)
- Siracusa (second round)
- Sorrento (second round)
- Spezia (second round)
- Taranto (second round)
- Trapani (first round)
- Triestina (third round)
- Tritium (first round)
- Virtus Lanciano (first round)

LND - Serie D (9 teams)

- Bacoli Sibilla (first round)
- Casertana (first round)
- Castel Rigone (second round)
- Pomigliano (first round)
- Pontedera (first round)
- Saint-Christophe (first round)
- Tamai (first round)
- Teramo (first round)
- Voghera (first round)

== Format and seeding ==
Teams enter the competition at various stages, as follows:

- First phase (one-legged fixtures)
  - First round: 36 teams from Lega Pro and Serie D start the tournament
  - Second round: the 18 winners from the previous round are joined by the 22 Serie B teams
  - Third round: the 20 winners from the second round meet the 12 Serie A sides seeded 9-20
  - Fourth round: the 16 survivors face each other
- Second phase
  - Round of 16 (one-legged): the 8 fourth round winners are inserted into a bracket with the Serie A clubs seeded 1-8
  - Quarterfinals (one-legged)
  - Semifinals (two-legged)
- Final at the Stadio Olimpico in Rome

== Matches ==
=== Elimination rounds ===
==== Section 1 ====
First Round
56	Reggiana	1
65	Carpi	2
57	Sorrento	4
64	Tamai	1

Second Round
25	Padova	4
65	Carpi	2
24	Crotone	1
57	Sorrento	0

Third Round
16	Bologna	2
25	Padova	1
17	Lecce	0
24	Crotone	2

Fourth Round
16	Bologna	4
24	Crotone	2

===== Match details =====
====== First round ======
7 August 2011
20:45 CEST

Reggiana	1 – 2	Carpi
Alessi 80' (pen.)	Report	33' Perini; 47' Concas

Stadio Giglio, Reggio Emilia
Attendance: 1,500
Referee: Andrea Tardino

7 August 2011
20:45 CEST

Sorrento	4 – 1	Tamai
Carlini 67'; Ginestra 79', 83'; Terra 90'	Report	67' Grandin

Stadio Italia, Sorrento
Attendance: 500
Referee: Pietro Dei Giudici

====== Second round ======
14 August 2011
20:30 CEST

Padova	4 – 2	Carpi
Legati 14'; Lazarević 26'; Cutolo 28', 85'	Report	27' Memushaj; 49' Concas

Stadio Euganeo, Padua
Referee: Piero Giacomelli

14 August 2011
20:45 CEST

Crotone	1 – 0	Sorrento
Galardo 79'	Report

Stadio Ezio Scida, Crotone
Referee: Marco Di Bello

====== Third round ======
21 August 2011
20:45 CEST

Bologna	2 – 1	Padova
Portanova 14'; Della Rocca 90+4'	Report	2' (pen.) Italiano

Stadio Renato Dall'Ara, Bologna
Referee: Gianluca Rocchi

21 August 2011
20:45 CEST

Lecce	0 – 2	Crotone
	Report	45' Đurić; 50' Ciano

Stadio Via del Mare, Lecce
Referee: Domenico Celi

====== Fourth round ======
23 November 2011
15:00 CET

Bologna	4 – 2	Crotone
Diamanti 11' (pen.); Vantaggiato 48'; Giménez 49'; Paponi 65'		Sansone 71'; Đurić 80' (pen.)

Stadio Renato Dall'Ara, Bologna

==== Section 2 ====
First Round
49	Pisa	3
72	Bacoli Sibilla	0
48	Piacenza	3
73	Pontedera	0
47	Alessandria	1
74	Casertana	0

Second Round
32	Cittadella (a.e.t)	3
49	Pisa	2
33	Empoli	4
48	Piacenza	1
34	Sampdoria (a.e.t)	3
47	Alessandria	2

Third Round
9	Fiorentina	2
32	Cittadella	1
33	Empoli	2
34	Sampdoria	1

Fourth Round
9	Fiorentina	2
33	Empoli	1

===== Match details =====
====== First round ======
6 August 2011
16:00 CEST

Piacenza	3 – 0	Pontedera
Guerra 66', 71', 90'	Report

Stadio Comunale, Fiorenzuola d'Arda
Attendance: 1,000
Referee: Gianluca Aureliano

7 August 2011
15:00 CEST

Alessandria	1 – 0	Casertana
Martini 39'	Report

Stadio Giuseppe Moccagatta, Alessandria
Attendance: 575
Referee: Gianluca Manganiello

7 August 2011
20:30 CEST

Pisa	3 – 0	Bacoli Sibilla
Carparelli 45' (pen.); Favasuli 72'; Obodo 90'	Report

Arena Garibaldi, Pisa
Attendance: 2,000
Referee: Claudio Lanza

====== Second round ======
13 August 2011
17:00 CEST

Cittadella	3 – 2 (a.e.t)	Pisa
Raimondi 32' (o.g.); Schiavon 57'; Martinelli 108'	Report	21' Carparelli; 41' Tremolada

Stadio Pier Cesare Tombolato, Cittadella
Attendance: 1,076
Referee: Renzo Candussio

14 August 2011
20:30 CEST

Empoli	4 – 1	Piacenza
Tavano 31', 57'; Coralli 54'; Tonelli 60'	Report	23' Guzmán

Stadio Carlo Castellani, Empoli
Referee: Maurizio Mariani

14 August 2011
20:45 CEST

Sampdoria	3 – 2 (a.e.t.)	Alessandria
Maccarone 13'; Accardi 81'; Sammarco 94'	Report	54' Simeone; 90+1' Martini

Stadio Luigi Ferraris, Genoa
Attendance: 12,066
Referee: Massimiliano Irrati

====== Third round ======
20 August 2011
19:00 CEST

Empoli	2 – 1	Sampdoria
Buscè 48'; Tavano 77' (pen.)	Report	61' Pozzi

Stadio Carlo Castellani, Empoli
Referee: Antonio Damato

21 August 2011
18:00 CEST

Fiorentina	2 – 1	Cittadella
Gilardino 11'; Cerci 47'	Report	37' Di Carmine

Stadio Artemio Franchi (Florence), Florence
Referee: Carmine Russo

====== Fourth round ======
24 November 2011
18:00 CET

Fiorentina	2 – 1	Empoli
Cerci 28', 37'	Report	Shekiladze 66'

Stadio Artemio Franchi, Florence

==== Section 3 ====
First Round
52	Como	1
69	Prato	2

Second Round
29	Grosseto	3
69	Prato	2
39	Sassuolo	2
42	Juve Stabia	1
40	Vicenza	1
41	Hellas Verona	2

Third Round
12	Parma	4
29	Grosseto	1
39	Sassuolo	3(2)
41	Hellas Verona (pen.)	3(4)

Fourth Round
12	Parma	0
41	Hellas Verona	2

===== Match details =====
====== First round ======
7 August 2011
17:00 CEST

Como	1 – 2	Prato
Lamma 76' (o.g.)	Report; Report2	13' Patacchiola; 23' Reis

Stadio Giuseppe Sinigaglia, Como
Attendance: 500
Referee: Daniele Minelli

====== Second round ======
14 August 2011
17:00 CEST

Sassuolo	2 – 1	Juve Stabia
Troiano 11'; Boakye 90+1'	Report	63' Mbakogu

Stadio Alberto Braglia, Modena
Attendance: 812
Referee: Leonardo Baracani

14 August 2011
17:00 CEST

Vicenza	1 – 2	Hellas Verona
Alemão 85'	Report	37' Abbate; 70' Hallfreðsson

Stadio Romeo Menti, Vicenza
Attendance: 6,000
Referee: Emiliano Gallione

14 August 2011
20:45 CEST

Grosseto	3 – 2	Prato
Sforzini 59'; Lupoli 66'; Caridi 78'	Report	3' Cavagna; 40' Marongiu

Stadio Olimpico Carlo Zecchini, Grosseto
Referee: Claudio Gavillucci

====== Third round ======
20 August 2011
19:00 CEST

Sassuolo	3 – 3 (a.e.t.)	Hellas Verona
Boakye 17'; Troiano 34'; Laribi 88'		27' Berrettoni; 62' D'Alessandro; 90+3' Ferrari
Penalties
Laribi (penalty missed); Troiano (penalty scored); Longhi (penalty scored); Boakye (penalty missed)	2 – 4	(penalty scored) Le Noci; (penalty scored) Esposito; (penalty missed) Juanito; (penalty scored) Mancini; (penalty scored) Ferrari

Stadio Alberto Braglia, Modena
Attendance: 3,500
Referee: Maurizio Ciampi

21 August 2011
20:45 CEST

Parma	4 – 1	Grosseto
Giovinco 44'; Pellè 57'; Crespo 73', 90+1'	Report	80' (o.g.) Paletta

Stadio Ennio Tardini, Parma
Referee: Andrea Gervasoni

====== Fourth round ======
29 November 2011
20:45 CET

Parma	0 – 2	Hellas Verona
	Report	Ferrari 37'; Juanito 61'

Stadio Ennio Tardini, Parma
Referee: Sebastiano Perruzzo

==== Section 4 ====
First Round
53	Latina	0
68	L'Aquila	1
60	Triestina	2
61	Voghera	0

Second Round
28	Brescia	5
60	L'Aquila	0
21	Pescara	2(9)
60	Triestina (pen.)	2(10)

Third Round
13	Catania	2
28	Brescia	1
20	Novara	4
60	Triestina	0

Fourth Round
13	Catania	2
20	Novara	3

===== Match details =====
====== First round ======
7 August 2011
18:00 CEST

Latina	0 – 1	L'Aquila
	Report	41' Garaffoni

Stadio Domenico Francioni, Latina
Attendance: 800
Referee: Cangiano (Italy)

7 August 2011
18:00 CEST

Triestina	2 – 0	Voghera
Princivalli 23'; Godeas 25'	Report

Stadio Nereo Rocco, Trieste
Attendance: 400
Referee: Ros

====== Second round ======
13 August 2011
18:00 CEST

Brescia	5 – 0	L'Aquila
Ruggiero 34' (o.g.); Jonathas 41'; Feczesin 52', 59'; De Maio 75'	Report

Stadio Mario Rigamonti, Brescia
Attendance: 1,500
Referee: Emilio Ostinelli

14 August 2011
17:30 CEST

Pescara	2 – 2 (a.e.t.)	Triestina
Insigne 87', 90+3'	Report report2	31' Princivalli; 82' Godeas
Penalties
Sansovini (penalty scored); Zanon (penalty scored); Verratti (penalty scored); Insigne (penalty scored); Cascione (penalty scored); Romagnoli (penalty scored); Giacomelli (penalty scored); Capuano (penalty missed); Balzano (penalty scored); Pinsoglio (penalty scored); Sansovini (penalty missed)	9 – 10	(penalty scored) Bariti; (penalty scored) Godeas; (penalty scored) Princivalli; (penalty scored) De Vena; (penalty scored) Pezzi; (penalty scored) Viotti; (penalty scored) D'Ambrosio; (penalty missed) Villanovich; (penalty scored) Miani; (penalty scored) Cecchini; (penalty scored) Bariti

Stadio Adriatico, Pescara
Attendance: 6,150
Referee: Luigi Nasca

====== Third round ======
21 August 2011
20:45 CEST

Catania	2 – 1	Brescia
López 38'; Gómez 90+1'	Report	55' Jonathas

Stadio Angelo Massimino, Catania
Attendance: 5,000
Referee: Sebastiano Peruzzo

21 August 2011
20:45 CEST

Novara	4 – 0	Triestina
D'Aiello 10' (o.g.); Pinardi 57'; Meggiorini 74'; Gemiti 78'	Report report2 report3

Stadio Silvio Piola (Novara), Novara
Attendance: 3,457
Referee: Riccardo Tozzi

====== Fourth round ======
29 November 2011
21:15 CET

Catania	2 – 3	Novara
Lanzafame 3'; López 70'	Report	Granoche 68'; Meggiorini 78', 90'

Stadio Angelo Massimino, Catania
Referee: Leonardo Barcani

==== Section 5 ====
First Round
54	Virtus Lanciano	1
67	Castel Rigone	2
59	Lumezzane	4
62	Pro Patria	1

Second Round
27	AlbinoLeffe	2
67	Castel Rigone	1
22	Torino	1
59	Lumezzane	0

Third Round
14	Cagliari	5
27	AlbinoLeffe	1
19	Siena	1
22	Torino	0

Fourth Round
14	Cagliari	1
19	Siena	2

===== Match details =====
====== First round ======
7 August 2011
18:00 CEST

Virtus Lanciano	1 – 2	Castel Rigone
Mammarella 60'	Report	17' De Luca; 36' Tranchitella

Stadio Guido Biondi, Lanciano
Referee: Francesco Fiore

7 August 2011
17:00 CEST

Lumezzane	4 – 1	Pro Patria
Ferrari 10'; Inglese 20', 40', 63'	Report	45+1' Gjoni

Nuovo Stadio Comunale, Lumezzane
Referee: Marco Bellotti

====== Second round ======
14 August 2011
18:00 CEST

AlbinoLeffe	2 – 1	Castel Rigone
Guastalvino 34' (o.g.); Laner 49'	Report	9' Tranchitella

Stadio Atleti Azzurri d'Italia, Bergamo
Attendance: 277
Referee: Marco Viti

13 August 2011
20:45 CEST

Torino	1 – 0	Lumezzane
Antenucci 64'	Report

Stadio Olimpico, Turin
Attendance: 12,000
Referee: Filippo Merchiori

====== Third round ======
21 August 2011
20:45 CEST

Cagliari	5 – 1	AlbinoLeffe
Nenê 36' (pen.); Larrivey 40', 51', 69'; Conti 50'	Report	63' Foglio

Stadio Sant'Elia, Cagliari
Referee: Daniele Doveri

21 August 2011
20:45 CEST

Siena	1 – 0	Torino
Calaiò 80' (pen.)	Report

Stadio Artemio Franchi, Siena
Referee: Paolo Valeri

====== Fourth round ======
24 November 2011
21:15 CET

Cagliari	1 - 2	Siena
Sampaio 84'	Report	González 17'; Ângelo 52'

Stadio Sant'Elia, Cagliari
Referee: Gianpaolo Calvarese

==== Section 6 ====
First Round
51	Siracusa	1
70	Teramo	0
44	Frosinone	3
77	Pomigliano	0
43	Barletta	0
78	Carrarese	1

Second Round
30	Livorno	3
51	Siracusa	1
37	Modena	4
44	Frosinone	0
38	Reggina	1
78	Carrarese	0

Third Round
11	Chievo	1
30	Livorno	0
37	Modena	2
38	Reggina	1

Fourth Round
11	Chievo	3
37	Modena	0

===== Match details =====
====== First round ======
7 August 2011
14:30 CEST

Siracusa	1 – 0	Teramo
Fofana 87'	Report

Stadio Nicola de Simone, Siracusa
Attendance: 2370
Referee: Michele Gallo

7 August 2011
14:30 CEST

Frosinone	3 – 0	Pomigliano
Bottone 41'; Vitale 50'; Diogo Tavares 57'	Report report2

Stadio Matusa, Frosinone
Attendance: 1607
Referee: Alessio Petroni

7 August 2011
17:00 CEST

Barletta	0 – 1	Carrarese
	Report; Report2	85' Cori

Stadio Cosimo Puttilli, Barletta
Attendance: 2392
Referee: Diego Roca

====== Second round ======
13 August 2011
17:30 CEST

Modena	4 – 0	Frosinone
8' (pen.), 18', 32' Greco; 35' Turati	Report

Stadio Alberto Braglia, Modena
Attendance: 2247
Referee: Dino Tommasi

13 August 2011
20:45 CEST

Livorno	3 – 1	Siracusa
Paulinho 36', 48'; Dionisi 74'	Report	14' Longoni

Stadio Armando Picchi, Livorno
Attendance: 2251
Referee: Angelo Martino Giancola

13 August 2011
20:45 CEST

Reggina	1 – 0	Carrarese
Missiroli 18' (pen.)	Report; Report2

Stadio Oreste Granillo, Reggio Calabria
Attendance: 2087
Referee: Massimiliano Velotto

====== Third round ======
21 August 2011
16:30 CEST

Modena	2 – 1	Reggina
Greco 4'; Di Gennaro 83'	Report	14' Emerson

Stadio Alberto Braglia, Modena
Attendance: 2583
Referee: Antonio Giannoccaro

21 August 2011
20:45 CEST

Chievo	1 – 0	Livorno
Cesar 12'	Report

Stadio Marc'Antonio Bentegodi, Verona
Attendance: 1000
Referee: Paolo Silvio Mazzoleni

====== Fourth round ======
23 November 2011
15:00 CET

Chievo	3 – 0	Modena
Uribe 34', 45+2'; Paloschi 49'	Report

Stadio Marc'Antonio Bentegodi, Verona
Referee: Christian Brighi

==== Section 7 ====
First Round
50	Foggia	3
71	Trapani	0
46	Spezia	3
75	Saint-Christophe	0
45	Portogruaro	0
76	Avellino	3

Second Round
31	Nocerina	2
50	Foggia	0
35	Bari	1
46	Spezia	0
36	Varese	0
76	Avellino	1

Third Round
10	Genoa	4
31	Nocerina	3
35	Bari	4
76	Avellino	0

Fourth Round
10	Genoa	3
35	Bari	2

===== Match details =====
====== First round ======
6 August 2011
17:00 CEST

Spezia	3 – 0	Saint-Christophe
Papini 25'; Iunco 43'; Evacuo 90'	Report

Stadio Miro Luperi, Sarzana
Attendance: 2500
Referee: Michael Fabbri

7 August 2011
17:00 CEST

Foggia	3 – 0	Trapani
Tiboni 19'; Lanzoni 45'; Venitucci 90' (pen.)	Report

Stadio Pino Zaccheria, Foggia
Attendance: 1886
Referee: Stefano D'Angelo

7 August 2011
18:00 CEST

Portogruaro	0 – 3	Avellino
	Report	27' De Angelis; 48', 89' Herrera

Stadio Pier Giovanni Mecchia, Portogruaro
Attendance: 500
Referee: Alessandro Caso

====== Second round ======
14 August 2011
20:00 CEST

Varese	0 – 1	Avellino
	Report	11' Correa

Stadio Mario Rigamonti, Brescia
Attendance: 1581
Referee: Davide Massa

14 August 2011
20:45 CEST

Bari	1 – 0	Spezia
Masiello 90'	Report

Stadio San Nicola, Bari
Attendance: 2000
Referee: Silvio Baratta

14 August 2011
20:45 CEST

Nocerina	2 – 0	Foggia
Castaldo 4', 37'	Report

Stadio San Francesco, Nocera Inferiore
Attendance: 5298
Referee: Angelo Cervellera

====== Third round ======
20 August 2011
18:00 CEST

Genoa	4 – 3	Nocerina
Palacio 13', 49'; Pratto 15'; Kaladze 90'	Report	38' Di Maio; 55' Plasmati; 88' Castaldo

Stadio Luigi Ferraris, Genoa
Attendance: 10572
Referee: Luca Banti

21 August 2011
20:45 CEST

Bari	4 – 0	Avellino
Marotta 39', 90+1'; Caputo 50'; Donati 61'	Report

Stadio San Nicola, Bari
Attendance: 5464
Referee: Marco Guida

====== Fourth round ======
24 November 2011
20:30 CET

Genoa	3 – 2 (a.e.t.)	Bari
Birsa 37' (pen.); Jorquera 90'; Pratto 115'	Report	Borghese 38'; Bellomo 90+2' (pen.)

Stadio Luigi Ferraris, Genoa
Referee: Andrea Gervasoni

==== Section 8 ====
First Round
55	Taranto	2
66	FeralpiSalò	1
58	Benevento (p)	1(4)
63	Tritium	1(3)

Second Round
26	Ascoli (a.e.t)	3
55	Taranto	1
23	Gubbio (pen.)	2(3)
58	Benevento	2(2)

Third Round
15	Cesena (a.e.t)	1
26	Ascoli	0
18	Atalanta	3
23	Gubbio	4

Fourth Round
15	Cesena	3
23	Gubbio	0

===== Match details =====
====== First round ======
6 August 2011
20:30 CEST

FeralpiSalò	1 – 2	Taranto
Savoia 65'	Report	18' Guazzo; 84' Girardi

Stadio Lino Turina, Salò
Attendance: 500
Referee: Cristian Brasi

7 August 2011
18:00 CEST

Benevento	1 – 1 (a.e.t)	Tritium
Vacca 16'	Report	29' Malgrati
Penalties
Germinale (penalty scored); Wágner (penalty scored); D'Anna (penalty missed); Frascatore (penalty scored); Vacca (penalty scored)	4 – 3	(penalty scored) Dionisi; (penalty missed) Floriano; (penalty scored) Bortolotto, R. (penalty scored) Chimenti; (penalty missed) Sinato

Stadio Ciro Vigorito, Benevento
Attendance: 2000
Referee: Lorenzo Illuzzi

====== Second round ======
14 August 2011
20:30 CEST

Ascoli	3 – 1 (a.e.t)	Taranto
Sbaffo 1'; Beretta 113', 115'	Report	8' Prosperi

Stadio Cino e Lillo Del Duca, Ascoli
Attendance: 1974
Referee: Aleandro Di Paolo

14 August 2011
20:45 CEST

Gubbio	2 – 2 (a.e.t)	Benevento
Ciofani 21' (pen.); Giannetti 92'	Report	72' Germinale; 114' Falzarano
Penalties
Farina (penalty scored); Giannetti (penalty scored); Garibaldi (penalty scored); Ciofani (penalty missed)	3 – 2	(penalty scored) Pedrelli; (penalty missed) Wágner; (penalty missed) Germinale; (penalty scored) Pintori; (penalty missed) Cipriani

Stadio Pietro Barbetti, Gubbio
Referee: Gennaro Palazzino

====== Third round ======
21 August 2011
20:30 CEST

Cesena	1 – 0 (a.e.t)	Ascoli
Bogdani 119'	Report

Stadio Olimpico, Serravalle, San Marino
Referee: Andrea De Marco

21 August 2011
20:45 CEST

Atalanta	3 – 4	Gubbio
Moralez 30'; Tiribocchi 38'; Gabbiadini 78'	Report	22' Bazzoffia; 48', 52', 87' Giannetti

Stadio Atleti Azzurri d'Italia, Bergamo
Referee: Gabriele Gava

====== Fourth round ======
30 November 2011
15:00 CET

Cesena	3 - 0	Gubbio
Bogdani 11' (pen.); Benalouane 68'; Candreva 90+2'	Report

Stadio Dino Manuzzi, Cesena

== Final stage ==
=== Bracket ===
Round of 16
1	Milan (a.e.t.)	2
16	Novara	1
8	Lazio	3
9	Hellas Verona	2
5	Juventus (a.e.t.)	2
41	Bologna	1
4	Roma	3
20	Fiorentina	0
3	Udinese	1
19	Chievo	2
6	Palermo	4(0)
11	Siena (p)	4(3)
7	Napoli	2
10	Cesena	1
2	Internazionale	2
Genoa	1

Quarter-finals
Milan	3
Lazio	1
Juventus	3
Roma	0
Chievo	0
Siena	1
Napoli	2
2	Internazionale	0

Semi-finals
Milan	1	2	3
Juventus (a.e.t.)	2	2	4
Siena	2	0	2
Napoli	1	2	3

Final
Juventus	0
Napoli	2

==== Round of 16 ====
8 December 2011
21:00 CET

Juventus	2–1 (a.e.t.)	Bologna
Giaccherini 90'; Marchisio 102'	Report	Raggi 90+6'

Juventus Stadium, Turin
Attendance: 25,000
Referee: Sebastiano Peruzzo

13 December 2011
21:00 CET

Palermo	4–4 (a.e.t.)	Siena
Iličić 39' (pen.), 46', 90+1' (pen.); Bertolo 98'	Report	Reginaldo 21', 59'; González 40'; Ângelo 100'
Penalties
Bollino (penalty missed); Iličić (penalty missed); Cetto (penalty missed)	0–3	(penalty scored) González; (penalty scored) Pesoli; (penalty scored) Ângelo

Stadio Renzo Barbera, Palermo
Referee: Andrea Gervasoni

10 January 2012
21:00 CET

Lazio	3–2	Hellas Verona
Dias 44'; Rocchi 57'; Hernanes 90+1'	Report	Berrettoni 61'; D'Alessandro 74'

Stadio Olimpico, Rome
Referee: Gianluca Rocchi

11 January 2012
17:30 CET

Udinese	1–2	Chievo
Di Natale 84'	Report	Sammarco 9'; Théréau 90+1'

Stadio Friuli, Udine
Referee: Sebastiano Peruzzo

11 January 2012
20:45 CET

Roma	3–0	Fiorentina
Lamela 53', 66'; Borini 75'	Report

Stadio Olimpico, Rome
Referee: Andrea De Marco

12 January 2012
21:00 CET

Napoli	2–1	Cesena
Cavani 65'; Pandev 86'	Report	Popescu 20'

Stadio San Paolo, Naples
Referee: Daniele Doveri

18 January 2012
21:00 CET

Milan	2–1 (a.e.t.)	Novara
El Shaarawy 24'; Pato 100'	Report	Radovanović 88'

San Siro, Milan
Referee: Antonio Danilo Giannoccaro

19 January 2012
21:00 CET

Internazionale	2–1	Genoa
Maicon 9'; Poli 49'	Report	Birsa 90+1'

San Siro, Milan
Referee: Carmine Russo

==== Quarter-finals ====
24 January 2012
20:45 CET

Juventus	3–0	Roma
Giaccherini 6'; Del Piero 30'; Kjær 90' (o.g.)	Report

Juventus Stadium, Turin
Attendance: 38,498
Referee: Luca Banti

25 January 2012
17:30 CET

Chievo	0–1	Siena
	Report	Destro 54'

Stadio Marc'Antonio Bentegodi, Verona
Referee: Daniele Doveri

25 January 2012
20:45 CET

Napoli	2–0	Internazionale
Cavani 50' (pen.), 90+3'	Report

Stadio San Paolo, Naples
Referee: Domenico Celi

26 January 2012
20:45 CET

Milan	3–1	Lazio
Robinho 15'; Seedorf 18'; Ibrahimović 84'	Report	Cissé 5'

San Siro, Milan
Referee: Andrea Gervasoni

==== Semi-finals ====
===== First leg =====
8 February 2012
20:45 CET

Milan	1–2	Juventus
El Shaarawy 62'	Report	Cáceres 53', 83'

San Siro, Milan
Referee: Paolo Mazzoleni

9 February 2012
20:45 CET

Siena	2–1	Napoli
Reginaldo 42'; D'Agostino 66'	Report	Pesoli 86' (o.g.)

Stadio Artemio Franchi – Montepaschi Arena, Siena
Referee: Andrea De Marco

===== Second leg =====
20 March 2012
20:45 CET

Juventus	2–2 (a.e.t.)	Milan
Del Piero 28'; Vučinić 96'	Report	Mesbah 51'; López 81'

Juventus Stadium, Turin
Referee: Daniele Orsato

21 March 2012
20:45 CET

Napoli	2–0	Siena
Vergassola 10' (o.g.); Cavani 31'	Report

Stadio San Paolo, Naples
Referee: Paolo Valeri

== Final ==
20 May 2012
21:00 CEST

Juventus	0–2	Napoli
	Report	Cavani 63' (pen.); Hamšík 83'

Stadio Olimpico, Rome
Attendance: 61,803
Referee: Christian Brighi

== Top goalscorers ==
Rank	Player	Club	Goals
1	(Uruguay) Edinson Cavani	Napoli	5
2	(Italy) Giuseppe Greco	Modena	4
3	(Italy) Francesco Tavano	Empoli	3
3	(Argentina) Maxi López	Catania, Milan	3
3	(Italy) Niccolò Giannetti	Gubbio	3
3	(Italy) Simone Guerra	Piacenza	3
3	(Italy) Riccardo Meggiorini	Novara	3
3	(Slovenia) Josip Iličić	Palermo	3
3	(Argentina) Joaquín Larrivey	Cagliari	3
3	(Italy) Roberto Inglese	Lumezzane	3
3	(Brazil) Reginaldo	Siena	3
3	(Italy) Alessio Cerci	Fiorentina	3
3	(Italy) Luigi Castaldo	Nocerina	3
