= Amedeo Calliari =

Italian footballer (born 1988)

Personal information
- Date of birth: 12 April 1988 (age 38)
- Place of birth: Rovereto, Italy
- Height: 1.79 m (5 ft 10 1/2 in)
- Position: Midfielder

Youth career
- Mori St.Stefano
- 2002–2008: Chievo

Senior career*
| Years | Team | Apps | (Gls) |
| 2008–2009 | Chievo | 0 | (0) |
| 2008–2009 | → Lumezzane (loan) | 24 | (2) |
| 2009–2010 | Triestina | 0 | (0) |
| 2009–2010 | → Lumezzane (loan) | 19 | (0) |
| 2010–2012 | Chievo | 0 | (0) |
| 2010–2011 | → Lumezzane (loan) | 32 | (2) |
| 2011–2012 | → South Tyrol (loan) | 18 | (1) |
| 2012–2014 | Monza | 35 | (1) |
| 2014–2015 | Mori St.Stefano | 23 | (0) |
| 2015–2019 | Benacense | 23 | (0) |
| Total | | 151 | (6) |
- * Club domestic league appearances and goals as of 30 June 2015

Amedeo Calliari (born 12 April 1988) is a former Italian professional footballer who played as a midfielder.

== Career ==
=== Youth career ===
Born in Rovereto, Trentino, Calliari started his career in the same province, for Mori–St.Stefano. In 2002, he was signed by Serie A side Chievo and spent 6 seasons at their youth teams.

Calliari was in Chievo's Primavera under-20 team in 2007–08 season.

=== Lumezzane & Triestina ===
He graduated from the youth team in June and loaned to Italian Lega Pro 1st Division (3rd highest level) club Lumezzane along with first team member Tommaso Chiecchi in July 2008.

On 26 June 2009, Calliari (for €325,000) along with ex-Primavera teammate Nicolò Brighenti (€425,000) were sold to Serie B side Triestina in co-ownership deals . Co-currently, Chievo signed Dario D'Ambrosio (€340,000) and Marcello Cottafava (€420,000) in co-ownership deals. On 9 July 2009, Chievo loaned D'Ambrosio and Cottafava back to Triestina, and Calliari and Brighenti were loaned to Lumezzane and Pergocrema of Italian Lega Pro 1st Division respectively.

After Triestina re-admitted to Serie B in August 2010, Triestina bought back Cottafava for €210,000 and Chievo bought Calliari back for €220,000 (while D'Ambrosio and Brighenti already back to their original club in January 2010). He was loaned to Lumezzane for a third time on 6 August 2010. It is because Calliari's contract had a nominal accounting value of €440,000 (purely through player swap), which Chievo chose to amortize it proportionally to contract length, instead of immediately write-down the inflated residual value. However, Chievo had write-down €506,695 for the sale of Brighenti in June 2011.

=== South Tyrol ===
On 31 August 2011 he joined South Tyrol, the team form his home autonomous region Trentino – South Tyrol.

=== Monza ===
On 22 August 2012 Calliari was sold to Monza in a co-ownership deal for just €500; Chievo also write-down the residual value of €114,000. On 20 February 2014 he was released.

=== Serie D ===
In October 2014 he was signed by Mori St.Stefano.
