= Nicolò Brighenti =

Italian footballer

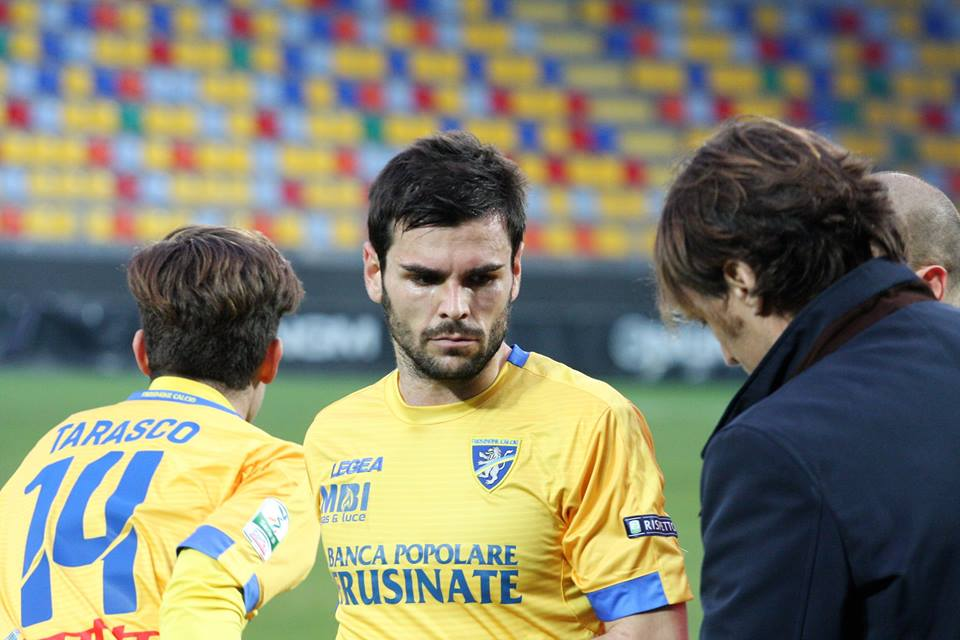

Personal information
- Date of birth: 1 August 1989 (age 37)
- Place of birth: Bussolengo, Italy
- Height: 1.78 m (5 ft 10 in)
- Position: Right-back

Team information
- Current team: Vicenza
- Number: 23

Youth career
- Chievo

Senior career*
Years	Team	Apps	(Gls)
2008–2009	Chievo	0	(0)
2008–2009	→ Mezzocorona (loan)	23	(0)
2009–2010	Triestina	0	(0)
2009–2010	→ Pergocrema (loan)	4	(0)
2010–2014	Chievo	0	(0)
2010–2011	→ Viareggio (loan)	23	(0)
2011–2012	Viareggio	19	(0)
2012–2013	Vicenza	38	(1)
2014–2016	Vicenza	51	(4)
2016–2022	Frosinone	129	(3)
2022–2026	Catanzaro	121	(3)
2026–	Vicenza	0	(0)

International career
2006–2007	Italy U-18	3	(0)
2007	Italy U-19	2	(0)
2009	Italy U-20	1	(0)
- * Club domestic league appearances and goals as of 21 August 2026

Nicolò Brighenti (born 1 August 1989) is an Italian professional footballer who plays as a right-back for Serie B club Vicenza.

== Club career ==
=== Chievo ===
Born in Bussolengo, in the Province of Verona, Veneto Brighenti started his career at A.C. ChievoVerona. In mid-2008, he left for the Seconda Divisione side Mezzocorona along with keeper Renato Piovezan and forward Diego Reis.

=== Triestina ===
On 26 June 2009, few days before the closure of 2008–09 fiscal year on 30 June 2009, he was sold to Serie B team Triestina for €425,000 along with Amedeo Calliari (for €325,000), in a co-ownership deal. In exchange, Marcello Cottafava (for €420,000) and Dario D'Ambrosio (€340,000) moved to Chievo, also in co-ownership deal. However, Cottafava and D'Ambrosio were loaned back to Triestina in July, co-currently Brighenti and Calliari loaned to the Prima Divisione sides Pergocrema and Lumezzane respectively. He only played 4 times.

=== Return to Chievo ===
In January 2010 (which in 2009–10 fiscal year) Brighenti returned to Chievo and D'Ambrosio returned to Triestina in exchange, both for €425,000. In August Cottafava and Calliari also returned to his original clubs respectively (in 2010–11 fiscal year; Cottafava for €210,000, Calliari for €220,000).

Brighenti did not play any game for Chievo in the second half of 2009–10 Serie A. He left the club again at the start of 2010–11 season.

=== Viareggio ===
On 31 August 2010 he was loaned to the Prima Divisione side Viareggio with option to purchase half of the registration rights. He became the starting right-back after Sergio Carnesalini left the club on 10 January 2011. He was suspended once, in round 23. He also played twice in the cup.

On 23 June 2011 Viareggio signed him in another co-ownership deal, for €30,000 fee, and signed a contract until 20 June 2013. In January 2012 Chievo bought back Brighenti for €50,000, but immediately sold Brighenti to Vicenza for €40,000, de facto made Viareggio profited €20,000 for the 6 months ownership of the 50% registration rights, and as the middle man cost Chievo €10,000.

=== Vicenza ===
Brighenti was signed by Vicenza Calcio for €40,000 in a 3.5-year contract in January 2012, which Chievo still retained the remaining 50% registration rights of the player. On 21 June 2013 Chievo bought back Brighenti. for €18,000.

However, since returning to Chievo, Brighenti failed to play any game for the Serie A club nor able to loan out.

On 1 July 2014 Brighenti returned to Vicenza in a 4-year contract for an undisclosed fee. On 30 June 2014 Chievo also signed Matteo Andriollo, Alessio Bertaso and Andrea Contri from Vicenza for a total fee of €1.8 million, with Stefan Kerezović, Alberto Paiolo and Alberto Tonin were signed by Vicenza for a total fee of also €1.8 million.

On 19 September 2015 Brighenti injured his pancreas in the match against Como. He was releases from the hospital on 1 October.

Brighenti's second spell was short-lived. He was sold in July 2016 after adding one more optional year in his contract in the same month.

=== Frosinone ===
On 29 July 2016 Brighenti was signed by Frosinone for an undisclosed fee.

=== Catanzaro ===
On 16 July 2022, Brighenti signed a two-year contract with Catanzaro.

== International career ==
Brighenti was in the squad of 2009 FIFA U-20 World Cup but pulled out due to injury, He was replaced by Matteo Bruscagin. He also played twice in 2008 UEFA European Under-19 Football Championship qualification.
