= Concas =

Concas is an Italian surname. Notable people with the surname include:

- Fabio Concas (born 1986), Italian footballer
- Graziella Concas (born 1970), Italian classical pianist and composer
