= Vincenzo Pepe =

Italian footballer (born 1987)

Personal information
- Date of birth: 4 April 1987 (age 39)
- Place of birth: Naples, Italy
- Height: 1.74 m (5 ft 9 in)
- Position: Winger

Youth career
- Parma

Senior career*
Years	Team	Apps	(Gls)
2005–2006	Sambenedettese	13	(0)
2006	Pescara	0	(0)
2006–2008	Cremonese	39	(6)
2008	→ Venezia (loan)	9	(0)
2008–2009	Avellino	27	(3)
2009–2011	Salernitana	23	(1)
2011–2012	Siracusa	27	(2)
2012–2013	Lanciano	11	(0)
2013	→ Nocerina (loan)	7	(0)
2013–2014	Pro Vercelli	19	(1)
2014–2015	Messina	13	(1)
2015	Martina	15	(1)
2015–2016	Abano	6	(2)
2016	Ischia Isolaverde	10	(1)
2016–2019	Potenza	59	(13)
2019	Avellino	4	(0)
2019	Fanfulla	1	(0)
2020–2021	Bitonto	5	(0)
2021	Giugliano	11	(1)
2021	Siracusa		
2021–2024	ASD Real Siracusa Belvedere		

International career
2003	Italy U16	3	(1)
2006–2008	Italy U20 Serie C	4	(1)
- * Club domestic league appearances and goals as of 2 October 2026

Vincenzo Pepe (born 4 April 1987) is an Italian footballer who plays as a winger.

== Club career ==
=== Early career ===
Born in Naples, Campania, Pepe was signed by Parma at young age. Pepe was in the Giovanissimi Nazionali squad in 2001–02 season, that team had Giuseppe Rossi and Arturo Lupoli as forward. He appeared twice as unused bench for Parma at 2004–05 UEFA Cup., wearing no.39 shirt. That season Pepe also a member of Primavera under-20 Team He was eligible as List B player (club youth product) In mid-2005 he left for Sambenedettese in co-ownership deal and made his professional debut. In January 2006 Pescara bought the 50% registration rights from Sambenedettese. He was awarded no.15 shirt of the first team. In June 2006 Parma gave up the remain 50% registration rights. Pepe then left for Cremonese on loan and in 2007–08 season turned to another co-ownership deal for €80,000. In June 2008 Pescara bought back Pepe by submitting a higher bid to Lega Calcio Serie C than Cremonese, a mechanism to decide the co-ownership if both clubs failed to submit an agreement before the deadline.

Pepe was included in Pescara's pre-season camp. However he was excluded from the club plan and sold to Serie B club Avellino on 1 September.

=== Avellino ===
On 1 September 2008 Pepe was signed by Avellino. Avellino was relegated in 2008 and but re-admitted to 2008–09 Serie B. In his first season in the second division, Pepe was a regular member of the starting eleven (21 starts), scoring 3 goals. However the Campania club relegated again in 2009 and expelled from the professional due to the financial test by FIGC. Pepe also became a free agent.

=== Salernitana ===
In July 2009 he was signed by another Serie B team Salernitana. He only made 16 starts in the first season with only 1 goal. Salernitana relegated after the season. In 2010–11 Lega Pro Prima Divisione, he only played 5 games until December 2010. It was reported that the club formed a swap deal with Triestina, but the deadline day deal collapsed and Nicola Princivalli remained in Trieste. Since December Pepe did not play any game for the Campania club. Salernitana lost the final of promotion playoff and folded after failing to acquire a license from FIGC.

=== Siracusa ===
In July 2011 he joined another third division club Siracusa. He secured a place in starting line-up since 30 October (round 10). He mainly played as a winger/wing forward in 4–2–3–1/4–3–3 formation or as a midfielder in 4–4–2 formation (when Marco Mancosu was rested) Before the winter break, Siracusa was the first in Group B.

Pepe also played in the first round of 2011–12 Coppa Italia. However Pepe in fact ineligible after sent off in his previous cup match for Salernitana. But no punish was given due to no one discover his ineligibility before the deadline of compliant.

=== Lanciano ===
After Siracusa was expelled from 2012–13 Lega Pro Prima Divisione, Pepe was signed by Serie B newcomer Lanciano in 2-year contract as a free agent. In January 2013 he was signed by Nocerina. In August 2013 Pepe was sold to Pro Vercelli, with Umberto Germano moved to Lanciano in temporary deal.

=== Lega Pro clubs ===
On 24 August 2013 Pepe was signed by Pro Vercelli. The club won promotion to 2014–15 Serie B.

In 2014 Pepe was signed by Messina.

In January 2015 Pepe was released. He joined another Lega Pro club Martina.

=== Serie D club ===
In November 2015 Pepe was signed by Abano.

=== Potenza ===
On 23 August 2016, he signed with Potenza.

=== Avellino return ===
On 24 January 2019 he joined Avellino in Serie D.

=== Palazzolo ===
In September 2019 Pepe was signed by Eccellenza club Palazzolo.

== International career ==
Pepe capped for Italy under-16 team in June 2003. He failed to win a cap from the main team but capped for its feeder team Serie C representative teams. He played for Serie C U-19 in a training match and U-20 team in 2006–07 Mirop Cup against Slovakia and Hungary. He also represented "U-20 C" against Italy U-21 B in December 2007. Pepe played in 2007–09 International Challenge Trophy. (He missed the third match as not eligible) Pepe also won the annual U-21 Serie C1 tournament with Serie C1 Group A representatives in January 2007 and January 2008.
