= Alberto Libertazzi =

Italian footballer (born 1992)

Personal information
- Date of birth: 1 January 1992 (age 34)
- Place of birth: Turin, Italy
- Height: 1.87 m (6 ft 2 in)
- Position: Striker

Team information
- Current team: Chieri
- Number: 25

Youth career
- 2008–2012: Juventus

Senior career*
Years	Team	Apps	(Gls)
2010–2012	Juventus	2	(0)
2012–2017	Novara	3	(1)
2013–2014	→ Pro Vercelli (loan)	2	(0)
2014	→ L'Aquila (loan)	11	(2)
2015	→ Pontedera (loan)	14	(2)
2015–2016	→ Siena (loan)	7	(0)
2016	→ Ancona (loan)	11	(1)
2016–2017	→ Servette (loan)	10	(0)
2017–2018	Gubbio	9	(0)
2018–2019	Gozzano	25	(4)
2019–2020	Rende	17	(2)
2020–2021	USD Breno	14	(3)
2021	RG Ticino	5	(0)
2022–	Chieri	10	(1)

International career
2007–2008	Italy U-16	10	(2)
2008–2009	Italy U-17	17	(2)
2009	Italy U-18	7	(3)
2010–2011	Italy U-19	3	(2)
- * Club domestic league appearances and goals as of 6 November 2022

Alberto Libertazzi (born 1 January 1992) is an Italian professional footballer who plays as a forward for Serie D club Chieri.

== Career ==
=== Juventus ===
Libertazzi made his professional debut for Juventus FC on 1 December 2010 in a 2010–11 UEFA Europa League game against Lech Poznań.

=== Novara ===
In 2012, he was included in the deal of Stefano Beltrame to Juventus from Novara. The 50% registration rights of Libertazzi was valued €450,000, while the 50% registration rights of Beltrame was valued for €750,000. Libertazzi signed a three-year contract. The co-ownership deal was renewed twice, in 2013, and 2014. Libertazzi also spent the whole 2013–14 season on loan, at first to fellow Piedmontese club Pro Vercelli. In January 2015 Libertazzi left Novara again for Pontedera.

In June 2015 Novara acquired Libertazzi outright from Juventus. On 14 July he was signed by Siena in a temporary deal. On 28 January 2016 the loan was terminated.

Libertazzi joined Swiss Challenge League side Servette.

On 29 September 2018, Gozzano signed him and Sampietro for free.

On 31 July 2019, he signed with Rende.

On 3 August 2021, he joined to RG Ticino in Serie D.

== Honours ==
Juventus Primavera

- Viareggio Tournament (2): 2010, 2012
