= Defendi =

Defendi is an Italian surname. Notable people with the surname include:

- Edoardo Defendi (born 1991), Italian footballer
- Marino Defendi (born 1985), Italian footballer
- Rodrigo Defendi (born 1986), Brazilian footballer
