= Roberto Codromaz =

Italian footballer

Personal information
- Date of birth: 14 October 1995 (age 31)
- Place of birth: Trieste, Italy
- Height: 1.88 m (6 ft 2 in)
- Position: Centre-back

Team information
- Current team: Union Clodiense Chioggia
- Number: 14

Youth career
- –2012: ASD Donatello
- 2012–2014: Udinese

Senior career*
Years	Team	Apps	(Gls)
2014–2015	Udinese	0	(0)
2014–2015	→ Feralpisalò (loan)	5	(0)
2015–2017	Feralpisalò	18	(1)
2017–2020	Triestina	52	(1)
2020	→ Rimini (loan)	5	(1)
2020–2021	Juve Stabia	15	(1)
2021	Ravenna	13	(0)
2021–2022	Piacenza	11	(1)
2022	→ Teramo (loan)	16	(1)
2022–2023	Cjarlins Muzane	31	(1)
2023–2024	Roma City	20	(2)
2024–2025	Ancona ASD	34	(0)
2025–	Union Clodiense Chioggia	13	(1)
- * Club domestic league appearances and goals as of 4 March 2026

Roberto Codromaz (born 14 October 1995) is an Italian professional footballer who plays as a centre-back for Serie D club Union Clodiense Chioggia.

== Club career ==
On 17 January 2022, he joined Teramo on loan.

On 15 July 2022, Codromaz moved to Cjarlins Muzane in Serie D. In August 2023, he joined fellow league club Roma City.
