= Umberto Germano =

Italian footballer

Personal information
- Date of birth: 22 April 1992 (age 34)
- Place of birth: Cigliano, Italy
- Height: 1.75 m (5 ft 9 in)
- Position: Defender

Youth career
- BarcanovaSalus
- 2007–2008: Canavese
- 2008–2010: Juventus

Senior career*
Years	Team	Apps	(Gls)
2010–2011	Juventus	0	(0)
2010–2011	→ Canavese (loan)	23	(2)
2011–2019	Pro Vercelli	229	(3)
2013–2014	→ Lanciano (loan)	10	(1)
2019–2023	Padova	97	(1)
2023–2025	Triestina	70	(0)

International career
2012	Italy U20 "C"	1	(0)
- * Club domestic league appearances and goals as of 25 April 2025

Umberto Germano (born 22 April 1992) is an Italian footballer who plays as a defender.

== Club career ==
=== Early career ===
Born in Cigliano, Piedmont, Germano was signed by Canavese from BarcanovaSalus in 2007. On 31 July 2008 he was signed by Juventus FC in a definitive deal. He was the member of the under-17 football team in 2008–09 season. In the next season he was a member of the reserve B - Berretti. He was a player for Juve in 2010 Dossena Trophy, scoring once against Cremonese. Germano also played for reserve A occasionally.

Germano was a player for Canavese in 2010–11 Lega Pro Seconda Divisione, as well as for their reserve team. He also returned to Juventus "Primavera" reserve team in May 2011.

=== Pro Vercelli ===
In July 2011 Germano was signed by another Piedmontese club Pro Vercelli. The club won the playoffs of 2011–12 Lega Pro Prima Divisione and promoted to Serie B after half a century wait. He also played once for the representative team of Lega Pro against San Marino in June 2012. Pro Vercelli finished as the 21st of 2012–13 Serie B and relegated back to the third division. On 24 August 2013 Germano was signed by Lanciano in a temporary deal, fellow Serie B struggler of last season which finished just above the relegated teams as the 18th. As part of the deal, Vincenzo Pepe left for Vercelli definitely.

On 2 July 2015 Germano signed a new three-year contract.

=== Padova ===
On 2 July 2019, he signed a 3-year contract with Padova.

=== Triestina ===
On 5 January 2023, Germano joined Triestina on a 2.5-year deal.
