= Davide Bariti =

Italian footballer (born 1991)

Personal information
- Date of birth: 7 July 1991 (age 35)
- Place of birth: La Spezia, Italy
- Height: 1.73 m (5 ft 8 in)
- Position: Midfielder

Team information
- Current team: Virtus Entella
- Number: 7

Youth career
- Carrarese

Senior career*
Years	Team	Apps	(Gls)
2008–2010	Carrarese	35	(1)
2010–2011	Triestina	22	(1)
2011–2012	Vicenza	15	(0)
2012–2014	Napoli	2	(0)
2012–2013	→ Avellino (loan)	21	(1)
2014–2015	Lupa Roma	25	(1)
2015–2016	Rimini	23	(1)
2016–2017	Ancona	32	(1)
2017–2019	Triestina	56	(0)
2019–2020	Sicula Leonzio	23	(1)
2021–2024	Pergolettese	137	(13)
2024–	Virtus Entella	64	(6)

International career
2009–2010	Italy U20 "C"	3	(0)
2011	Italy U20	1	(0)
- * Club domestic league appearances and goals as of 13 May 2026

Davide Bariti (born 7 July 1991) is an Italian footballer who plays as a midfielder for Serie B club Virtus Entella.

== Club career ==
=== Carrarese ===
Born in La Spezia, Liguria, Bariti began his career with nearby Tuscan club Carrarese. He was the member of Allievi B U16 team in 2006–07 season. In January 2009, Bariti made his first team debut.

=== Triestina ===
On 31 August 2009, Triestina signed Bariti in co-ownership deal for €150,000 (Note: Order of co-ownership was reversed, Triestina bought Bariti outright for €160,000 and re-sold half of the registration rights to Carrarese for €10,000.) and sent him back to Lega Pro Seconda Divisione. In June 2010, Triestina bought Bariti outright for an undisclosed fee. Bariti played 22 games (5 starts) for Triestina in 2010–11 Serie B. The team was relegated at the end of the season.

Bariti played the first two rounds of 2011–12 Coppa Italia before leaving Triestina. He scored the 1st and 11th kick of Triestina in the penalty shootout. (Note: For unknown reason, both teams had 11-men in the field but only 10-men take the kick: Eugênio Rômulo Togni and Armando Izzo did not take the kick.)

=== Vicenza ===
On 31 August 2011, Triestina sold Bariti to Vicenza for free (along with Marco Franceschin for an undisclosed fee) and the club re-sold half of the registration rights of Bariti to Napoli, for €550,000 in a 3-year deal. On the same day, Bariti returned to the city of Vicenza for 2011–12 Serie B.

=== Napoli ===
On 22 June 2012, Napoli acquired Bariti outright after Vicenza were also relegated. However, Vicenza would only receive half of Mario Sgambato's "card" as compensation. On 31 August 2012, Bariti was loaned out to Lega Pro Prima Divisione club Avellino.

In 2013–14 Serie A, Bariti was a player for Napoli's first team. He made two appearances.

=== Lupa Roma ===
In 2014, Bariti was released by Napoli. He was signed by Lega Pro club Lupa Roma.

=== Sicula Leonzio ===
On 10 August 2019, he signed a two-year contract with Sicula Leonzio.

=== Pergolettese ===
On 10 October 2020, he joined Pergolettese.

=== Entella ===
On 1 August 2024, Bariti moved to Virtus Entella.

== International career ==
Bariti played against Slovakia and Slovenia in 2008–09 Mirop Cup for Italy U20 Lega Pro team in April and November 2009. He also played the next match, against Malta in 2009–11 International Challenge Trophy in December 2009. Bariti also played for Italy U20 lega Pro in 2009 and 2010 Trofeo Dossena, winning New York Magic (men S-20 team) and the youth team of Internacional in the finals, respectively.

Bariti played once for the Italy U20 A team in the last match of 2010–11 Four Nations Tournament, in June 2011.

In January 2012, Bariti received his first U21 call-up, for a training camp in Rome.
