= Riccardo Martignago =

Italian footballer

Personal information
- Date of birth: 6 August 1991 (age 35)
- Place of birth: Montebelluna, Italy
- Height: 1.82 m (6 ft 0 in)
- Position: Midfielder

Team information
- Current team: Union Clodiense Chioggia
- Number: 24

Senior career*
Years	Team	Apps	(Gls)
2007–2009	Montebelluna	1	(0)
2009–2013	Cittadella	15	(0)
2012	→ Latina (loan)	14	(2)
2013–2015	Catanzaro	35	(4)
2015	→ Pistoiese (loan)	12	(0)
2015–2018	Pordenone	55	(6)
2018	Mestre	13	(3)
2018–2019	Albissola	35	(15)
2019–2020	Teramo	17	(1)
2020	→ Alessandria (loan)	4	(1)
2020–2021	Ravenna	29	(3)
2021–2022	AlbinoLeffe	19	(2)
2022–2023	Alessandria	28	(5)
2023–2024	Sorrento	32	(4)
2024–2025	Latina	12	(0)
2025–	Union Clodiense Chioggia	1	(0)
- * Club domestic league appearances and goals as of 4 January 2025

Riccardo Martignago (born 6 August 1991) is an Italian football player who plays for Serie D club Union Clodiense Chioggia.

== Club career ==
He made his Serie B debut for Cittadella on 8 May 2010 in a game against Frosinone.

On 8 August 2019, he signed a 2-year contract with Teramo. On 30 January 2020, he joined Alessandria on loan.

On 30 September 2020 he joined Ravenna on a two-year contract.

On 20 August 2021, Martignago joined to AlbinoLeffe.

On 18 October 2022, he returned to Alessandria.
