= Tommaso Farabegoli =

Italian footballer

Personal information
- Date of birth: 26 March 1999 (age 27)
- Place of birth: Cesena, Italy
- Height: 1.86 m (6 ft 1 in)
- Position: Defender

Team information
- Current team: UC Chioggia
- Number: 28

Youth career
- –2018: Cesena
- 2018: → Sassuolo (loan)
- 2018–2019: Sampdoria

Senior career*
Years	Team	Apps	(Gls)
2017–2018	Cesena	0	(0)
2018	→ Sassuolo (loan)	0	(0)
2018–2022	Sampdoria	0	(0)
2019–2021	→ Vis Pesaro (loan)	36	(0)
2021	→ Feralpisalò (loan)	12	(0)
2021–2022	→ Ancona-Matelica (loan)	5	(0)
2022	→ Feralpisalò (loan)	3	(0)
2022	Sangiuliano	0	(0)
2022–2023	Campodarsego	17	(0)
2023–2025	Treviso	69	(0)
2025–	UC Chioggia	26	(0)
- * Club domestic league appearances and goals as of 4 March 2026

Tommaso Farabegoli (born 26 March 1999) is an Italian football who plays as a defender for Serie D club UC Chioggia.

== Club career ==
=== Cesena ===
He was raised in the youth teams of Cesena and started playing for their Under-19 squad in the 2016–17 season.

In the first half of the 2017–18 Serie B season he was called up to the senior squad many times, but didn't make any appearances.

==== Loan to Sassuolo ====
On 14 January 2018 he joined Sassuolo on loan until the end of the season. There he played for the Under-19 squad.

=== Sampdoria ===
Following Cesena's bankruptcy in the summer of 2018, he became a free agent and joined Serie A club Sampdoria. He spent most of the following 2018–19 season in the Under-19 squad again. He was called up for the senior squad for the first time on 5 May 2019 for a game against Parma, but stayed on the bench.

==== Loans to Serie C ====
On 16 July 2019 he was loaned to Serie C club Vis Pesaro.

He made his professional Serie C debut for Vis Pesaro on 25 August 2019 in a game against Südtirol. He started the game and played the whole match. He established himself as regular starter early in the season.

On 28 August 2020 the loan has been extended.

On 8 January 2021 he moved on a new loan to Feralpisalò.

On 13 August 2021 he was loaned to Ancona-Matelica. On 27 January 2022, he returned to Feralpisalò on a new loan.

=== Serie C ===
On 28 July 2022, Farabegoli signed a two-year contract with Sangiuliano, newly promoted to Serie C. On 14 December 2022, his contract with Sangiuliano was terminated by mutual consent.

=== Serie D ===
On 15 December 2022, Farabegoli joined Serie D club Campodarsego.
