= Dario D'Ambrosio =

Italian footballer (born 1988)

Personal information
- Date of birth: 9 September 1988 (age 38)
- Place of birth: Naples, Italy
- Height: 1.89 m (6 ft 2 1/2 in)
- Position: Defender

Youth career
- –2005: Salernitana
- 2005–2007: Fiorentina

Senior career*
Years	Team	Apps	(Gls)
2007–2008	Scafatese	12	(0)
2008–2009	Lecco	32	(2)
2009–2012	Triestina	68	(1)
2012–2013	Lumezzane	20	(3)
2013–2015	Lecce	27	(2)
2015	Monza	9	(0)
2015–2020	Siena	127	(6)
2016	→ Bassano (loan)	9	(1)
2020–2021	Sambenedettese	36	(1)
2021–2022	Viterbese	35	(5)
2022–2023	Carrarese	28	(3)
- * Club domestic league appearances and goals as of 23 April 2023

Dario D'Ambrosio (born 9 September 1988) is an Italian footballer who plays as a defender.

== Career ==
Along with his twin brother Danilo, D'Ambrosio started his career at Fiorentina's Primavera team. In 2007–08 season, he left for Serie C2 side Scafatese. In the next season, he left for Lecco at Lega Pro Prima Divisione (ex-Serie C1), signed a reported 2-year contract.

=== Triestina ===
In mid of 2008–09 season, he was signed by Serie B side Triestina but loaned back to Lecco.

In June 2009, he was signed by Chievo along with Marcello Cottafava in co-ownership deal, for €340,000 and €420,000. (total €760,000) The Trieste club also got Amedeo Calliari and Nicolò Brighenti in co-ownership deal, for €325,000 and €425,000 respectively (total €750,000), made the deal almost a pure player swap. D'Ambrosio returned Triestina on loan in July 2009 and bought back by Triestina in January 2010 and Brighenti returned to Chievo on the same day, for €425,000 each.

After the transaction on 28 January, he did not play any game for Triestina and the club relegated, only re-admitted to 2010–11 Serie B due to the expel of A.C. Ancona. However, D'Ambrosio and Cottafava, who carried a high accounting value which generated high amortize cost, as well as other financial problem limited the club to sign player, which the club relegated again in 2011, and ultimately declared bankruptcy in mid of 2011–12 Lega Pro Prima Divisione. The creditor got nothing from Cottafava nor D'Ambrosio's contract, which "worth" €440,000 in August 2010 and €850,000 in January 2010 respectively and released as free agent in 2011 and 2012 respectively.

=== Lega Pro journeyman ===
Since 2012 D'Ambrosio was signed by various Lega Pro clubs (Prime Divisione and Divisione Unica).

In July 2012 he was signed by Lumezzane. On 30 January 2013 he was signed by U.S. Lecce.

On 1 February 2015 he was signed by Monza.

On 16 July 2015 D'Ambrosio was signed by Siena in a two-year contract. D'Ambrosio was signed by Bassano Virtus 55 Soccer Team in a temporary deal on 30 January 2016, with Giuseppe Fella moved to Tuscany from Veneto.

On 1 July 2016 D'Ambrosio returned to Siena. He wore number 14 shirt in the new season; starting from 2016 to 2017 season, Lega Pro club was required to have a fixed shirt number throughout the whole season.

On 28 August 2020 he signed a 2-year contract with Sambenedettese.

On 8 August 2021 he joined Viterbese on a two-year contract.

On 9 August 2022, D'Ambrosio moved to Carrarese for one year.
