= Emanuele D'Anna =

Italian footballer (born 1982)

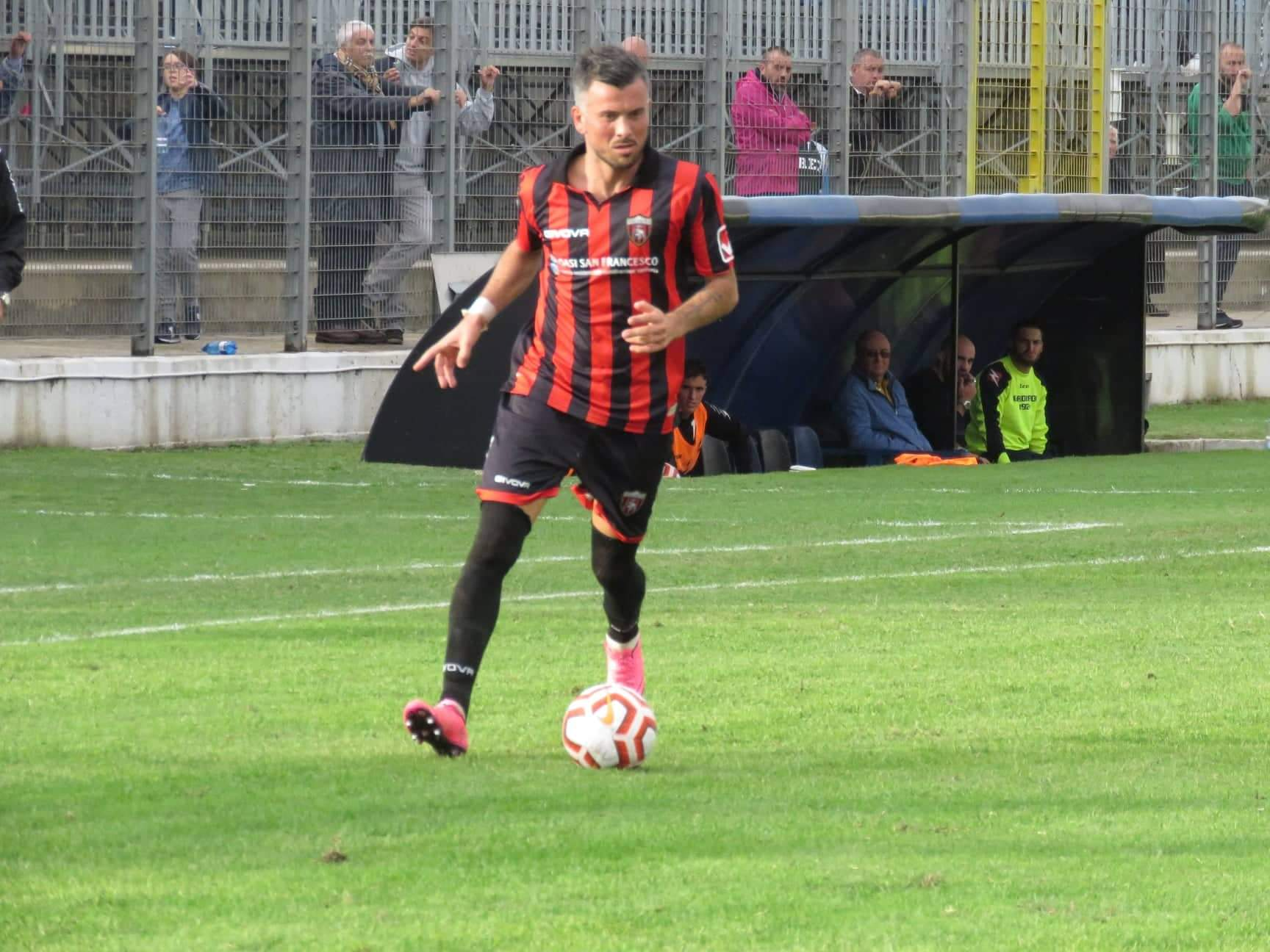
- Emanuele D'Anna

Personal information
- Full name: Emanuele D'Anna
- Date of birth: May 23, 1982 (age 44)
- Place of birth: Baiano, Italy
- Height: 1.79 m (5 ft 10 in)
- Position: Left back

Team information
- Current team: Nocerina

Youth career
- –1999: Ascoli
- 1999–2000: Milan

Senior career*
Years	Team	Apps	(Gls)
2000–2003	Milan	0	(0)
2000–2003	→ Chieti (loan)	67	(1)
2003–2005	Piacenza	45	(4)
2005–2007	Arezzo	17	(0)
2006	→ Juve Stabia (loan)	14	(1)
2007	→ Pisa (loan)	15	(1)
2007–2008	Pisa	35	(4)
2008–2009	Chievo	9	(0)
2009	→ Pisa (loan)	15	(0)
2009–2013	Benevento	108	(9)
2014	FC Sorrento	15	(0)
2014–2015	Gubbio	37	(2)
2015–2016	Maceratese	28	(1)
2016–2017	Cosenza	25	(0)
2017–2018	Casertana	32	(1)
2018–2019	Nola	29	(2)
2019–	Nocerina	17	(2)
- * Club domestic league appearances and goals as of 23:58, 16 March 2020 (UTC)

Emanuele D'Anna (born 23 May 1982) is an Italian footballer who plays for A.S.D. Nocerina 1910.

== Club career ==
A Milan youth product, he was loaned to Chieti of Serie C2 (later promoted to Serie C1). In July 2003, he moved to Piacenza which newly relegated to Serie B in joint-ownership bid. In July 2005, he moved to another Serie B club, Arezzo. After just played 17 league matches in a season, D'Anna was loaned to Serie C1 clubs, Juve Stabia and Pisa. Arezzo relegated to Serie C1 in summer 2007, and Pisa signed D'Anna permanently. After a season with Pisa, he moved to Chievo on 4 July 2008. On January 31, 2009 he was sent back on loan to Pisa following a spell at Chievo Verona, where he found playing time hard to come by.

D'Anna sign for Benevento in July 2009.

== Honours and awards ==
- Serie C1: Third Place and promotion playoff winner (2007)
- Serie C2: Runner up and promotion playoff winner (2001)
