= Cesare Ambrosini =

Italian footballer (born 1990)

Personal information
- Date of birth: 31 March 1990 (age 36)
- Place of birth: Erba, Italy
- Height: 1.81 m (5 ft 11 in)
- Position: Centre back

Team information
- Current team: Villa Valle

Senior career*
Years	Team	Apps	(Gls)
2007–2008	Como	1	(0)
2008–2009	Tavolara	44	(0)
2010	Renate	2	(0)
2010–2011	Derthona	30	(1)
2011–2016	Como	124	(0)
2017	Modena	21	(0)
2017–2018	AC Rezzato	8	(0)
2018–2020	Sondrio	46	(0)
2020	Rimini	6	(0)
2020	AC Legnano	5	(0)
2020–2021	Tritium	21	(0)
2021–2022	Legnago Salus	15	(0)
2022–	Villa Valle	7	(2)
- * Club domestic league appearances and goals as of 13 March 2022

Cesare Ambrosini (born 31 March 1990) is an Italian footballer who plays as a centre back for Villa Valle.

== Club career ==
On 15 January 2020, he signed with Serie C club Rimini until the end of the 2019–20 season.

On 8 July 2021, he joined Legnago. On 27 January 2022, his contract with Legnago was terminated by mutual consent.

On 10 February 2022, Ambrosini signed with Serie D club Villa Valle.
