= Fabio Adobati =

Italian football defender

Personal information
- Date of birth: 8 April 1988 (age 38)
- Place of birth: San Giovanni, Italy
- Height: 1.79 m (5 ft 10 in)
- Position: Defender

Team information
- Current team: Tritium

Youth career
- Atalanta

Senior career*
Years	Team	Apps	(Gls)
2007–2010	Como	52	(2)
2010–2015	Renate	133	(5)
2015–2017	Forlì	63	(2)
2017–2018	Como	25	(1)
2019	Ciserano	23	(0)
2019–	Tritium	14	(0)
- * Club domestic league appearances and goals as of 15:04, 15 March 2020 (UTC)

Fabio Adobati (born 8 April 1988) is an Italian football defender who plays for Tritium Calcio 1908.

== Career ==
On 18 October 2019 it was confirmed, that Adobati had joined Serie D club Tritium Calcio 1908.

== Domestic League Records ==
Year	Competition	Apps	Goal
2009–2010	Serie C1	9	0
2010–2015	Serie C2	57	2
2007–2009	Serie D	43	2
Total		109	4
