= Luca Cecchini =

Italian footballer

Personal information
- Date of birth: 10 April 1993 (age 33)
- Place of birth: San Daniele del Friuli, Italy
- Height: 1.78 m (5 ft 10 in)
- Position: Left back

Youth career
- 1999–2000: Pro Fagagna
- 2000–2005: Rive d'Arcano
- 2005–2008: Donatello
- 2008–2009: Treviso

Senior career*
Years	Team	Apps	(Gls)
2009–2013	Triestina	45	(1)
2012–2013	→ Virtus Entella (loan)	8	(0)
2013–2016	Virtus Entella	35	(2)
2015–2016	→ Teramo (loan)	23	(4)
2016–2018	Lucchese	66	(6)
2018–2019	Sambenedettese	23	(1)
2019–2020	→ San Luigi	17	(1)
2020–2021	→ Manzanese	10	(-)
2021–2022	→ BrianLignano	10	(-)
- * Club domestic league appearances and goals

Luca Cecchini (born 10 April 1993) is an Italian footballer.
