= Luciano Gualdi =

Italian footballer

Personal information
- Date of birth: 30 January 1989 (age 37)
- Place of birth: Bergamo, Italy
- Height: 1.73 m (5 ft 8 in)
- Position: Midfielder

Team information
- Current team: Folgore Caratese

Youth career
- AlbinoLeffe

Senior career*
Years	Team	Apps	(Gls)
2008–2010	AlbinoLeffe	0	(0)
2008–2010	→ Colognese (loan)	65	(9)
2010–2014	Renate	126	(21)
2014–2015	Ascoli	22	(0)
2015–2016	Venezia	16	(4)
2016–2017	Fano	33	(2)
2017	Acireale	11	(2)
2017–2018	AC Rezzato	19	(3)
2018–2022	Pro Sesto	108	(19)
2022–	Folgore Caratese	3	(0)
- * Club domestic league appearances and goals as of 18 September 2022

Luciano Gualdi (born 30 January 1989) is an Italian professional footballer who plays as a midfielder for Serie D club Folgore Caratese.

== Club career ==
Formed on AlbinoLeffe youth system, Gualdi made his senior debut for Colognese on Serie D. In 2010 he joined to Renate, played more than 100 matches for the club. For the 2014–15 season, he joined Ascoli.

In 2018, he joined Serie C club Pro Sesto. After four full seasons with the club, Gualdi initially stated his intention to retire from professional football, as he also became a free agent: however, in July 2022, he announced that he had changed his mind and wanted to keep playing.
