= Union Clodiense Chioggia FC =

Italian football club

Union Clodiense Chioggia
- Full name: Union Clodiense Chioggia; Football Club srl
- Founded: 1971 (Union Clodia Sottomarina); 2011 (merger with Sottomarina Lido); 2019 Ac Clodiense Chioggia
- Ground: Stadio Aldo e Dino Ballarin, Chioggia, Italy
- Capacity: 3,622
- Chairman: Ivano Boscolo Bielo
- Manager: Bruno Tedino
- League: Serie D
- 2024–25: Serie C Group A, 20th of 20 (relegated)
- Website: https://www.unionclodiense.it/
Home colours	Away colours

Union Clodiense Chioggia Football Club, commonly known as Union Clodiense Chioggia, is an Italian association football club located in Chioggia, Veneto. It plays in Serie D.

== History ==
=== Early years ===
Logo of A.C. Chioggia Sottomarina

The first incarnation of the current club was founded in 1971 as Union Clodia Sottomarina, when two teams from Chioggia, U.S. Sottomarina Lido (founded in 1959 and based in the frazione of Sottomarina) and Clodia, were merged.

After many years in Serie C, the team was relegated to lower divisions in 1977.

In 1989, the club changed its name to S.S.C. Chioggia Sottomarina and, in 1995, to A.C. Chioggia Sottomarina. Three years later, it was promoted from Eccellenza Veneto to Serie D.

In the summer of 2011, the club did not apply to participate in the 2011-12 Serie D due to financial issues. It successively merged with Eccellenza Veneto rival crosstown club Sottomarina Lido to become A.S.D. Clodiense, winning promotion back to Serie D one year later.

In the summer of 2012, it was renamed Union Clodiense and adopted its current denomination in 2019.

In 2024, Union Clodiense Chioggia were crowned Serie D Group C champions, thus winning promotion to Serie C.

== Players ==
=== Current squad ===
As of 5 February 2026

Note: Flags indicate national team as defined under FIFA eligibility rules; some limited exceptions apply. Players may hold more than one non-FIFA nationality.

No.	Pos.	Nation	Player
1	GK	ITA	Luca Minozzi
2	DF	ITA	Diego Guli
5	DF	ITA	Nicolò Montin (Captain)
6	MF	ITA	Igor Radrezza
7	FW	ITA	Filippo De Paoli
8	FW	CIV	Yves Gnago
9	FW	ITA	Andrea Bianchimano
11	MF	ITA	Gabriele Colzi
14	DF	ITA	Roberto Codromaz
15	DF	ITA	Ruben Trolese
16	MF	ITA	Emanuele Menghi
17	FW	ITA	Davide Rosso

No.	Pos.	Nation	Player
18	MF	ITA	Rinaldo Maestrelli
19	FW	ITA	Alessio Menato
21	FW	ITA	Nicholas Cocola
22	GK	SEN	Amadou Fall
25	FW	ITA	Luigi Maria Ricciardi
26	DF	ITA	Adriano Puccio
27	DF	ITA	Alessandro Zorzi (on loan from LR Vicenza)
28	DF	ITA	Tommaso Farabegoli
29	MF	ITA	Matteo Baldini
30	MF	SEN	Ibrahima Ba
—	FW	ITA	Giuseppe Martinez

== Colors and badge ==
Its colours are all-dark red, in reference to the Grande Torino, where two players born in Chioggia, brothers Aldo and Dino Ballarin, played.
