= Michele Cruciani =

Italian football player

Personal information
- Date of birth: 4 May 1986 (age 40)
- Place of birth: Rome, Italy
- Height: 1.68 m (5 ft 6 in)
- Position: Midfielder

Team information
- Current team: Scandicci

Youth career
- Lazio

Senior career*
Years	Team	Apps	(Gls)
2006–2008	Virtus Lanciano	26	(0)
2008–2009	Valle del Giovenco	46	(6)
2010	Gela	22	(2)
2011	Chernomorets Burgas	2	(0)
2011–2012	Aprilia	36	(2)
2012–2013	Matera	30	(6)
2013–2015	Casertana	40	(2)
2015–2016	Benevento	15	(0)
2016	→ Teramo (loan)	16	(4)
2016–2017	Viterbese	23	(2)
2017–2018	Robur Siena	14	(0)
2018	Massese	8	(2)
2018–2019	Lornano Badesse		
2019–2021	Lucchese	32	(9)
2021–2022	Unipomezia	24	(5)
2022–	Scandicci	9	(2)
- * Club domestic league appearances and goals as of 21:14, 12 February 2023 (UTC)

Michele Cruciani (born 4 May 1986) is an Italian football player who currently plays for Scandicci as a midfielder.
