= Giuseppe Greco (footballer, born 1983) =

Italian footballer

Personal information
- Full name: Giuseppe Greco
- Date of birth: 6 August 1983 (age 43)
- Place of birth: Palermo, Italy
- Height: 1.82 m (6 ft 0 in)
- Position: Striker

Youth career
- 1997–1997: Amiternina
- 1999–2000: Pavia
- 2000–2001: Sampdoria

Senior career*
Years	Team	Apps	(Gls)
2001–2002	Pavia	13	(1)
2002–2003	Como	3	(0)
2003–2012	Genoa	45	(10)
2003–2004	→ Como (loan)	18	(0)
2004–2005	→ Padova (loan)	25	(3)
2006	→ Catanzaro (loan)	8	(1)
2007–2008	→ Chievo (loan)	8	(1)
2008	→ Rimini (loan)	16	(7)
2008–2009	→ Pisa (loan)	24	(10)
2009–2010	→ Bari (loan)	6	(1)
2010	→ Cesena (loan)	16	(3)
2010–2011	→ Grosseto (loan)	13	(1)
2011–2012	→ Modena (loan)	17	(8)
2012	Modena	11	(1)
2013–2014	Pro Vercelli	34	(4)
2014–2015	Venezia	29	(9)
2015–2016	FeralpiSalò	13	(3)
2016	Arezzo	11	(2)
2016–2017	Castelvetro	27	(13)
2017–2018	Rosselli Mutina	27	(18)
2018	Axys Zola	9	(1)
2018–2019	Brescello		
2019	Castellarano		
2020	Virtus Camposanto		
2020	Sanmichelese		
- * Club domestic league appearances and goals as of 10 October 2021

Giuseppe "Beppe" Greco (born 6 August 1983) is an Italian former professional footballer who played as a striker.

== Career ==
=== Early career ===
Greco was born in Palermo, but moved to Pizzoli, L'Aquila at a young age. He began to play youth football at local club Amiternina. At age 16, he moved to the Pavia youth academy and then, for one year, he was enrolled in the Sampdoria youth teams.

=== Professional career ===
He returned to Pavia, where he would start his senior career, later playing for Como. He made his Serie A debut on 3 May 2003, against Milan, coming on as a 51st-minute substitute for Luigi Anaclerio in a 0–2 away loss at San Siro. He was signed by Sampdoria city rival Genoa in summer 2003, after former Como owner Enrico Preziosi took over Genoa, but he was loaned back to Como and then to Padova.

He returned to Genoa in Serie C1, and left on loan to Catanzaro of Serie B in January 2006. He helped Genoa to win promotion to Serie A in summer 2007, but he then left on loan to Chievo and Rimini. On 28 January 2010, Genoa loaned the forward to Cesena until the end of the season. After his return to Genoa they loaned him to Grosseto in Serie B in the summer of 2010 where he played 10 games and scored 1 goal. However, in early 2011, he was loaned out again to Modena, also in Serie B, where he scored 8 goals in 17 games.

In January 2013, Greco moved to Pro Vercelli, with whom he won a promotion to Serie B. The following year he signed with Venezia, competing in Serie C.

On 25 June 2015, he joined FeralpiSalò, signing a one-year contract. Halfway through the season, on 29 January 2016, he moved to Arezzo, where he made his debut the following day and immediately proved to be decisive in a 4–0 win over Tuttocuoio. In the game, he scored two goals in the first five minutes as well as providing an assist.

=== Later career ===
Then followed seasons in lower-league football for teams in Emilia-Romagna. On 9 June 2016, Greco moved to Castelvetro, a team from the Province of Modena recently promoted to Serie D. The following season he joined fifth-tier Eccellenza club Rosselli Mutina, before moving to Axys Zola from Zola Predosa, newly promoted to Serie D, and in June 2019 he signed for Castellarano, competing in Promozione, the sixth tier of the Italian football pyramid. Short stints then followed Virtus Camposanto and Sanmichelese in 2020.
