= Danilo Alessandro =

Italian professional footballer (born 1988)

Personal information
- Date of birth: 3 August 1988 (age 38)
- Place of birth: Rome, Italy
- Height: 1.80 m (5 ft 11 in)
- Position: Forward

Team information
- Current team: Pro Palazzolo
- Number: 10

Senior career*
Years	Team	Apps	(Gls)
2008–2009	Mentana Jenne		
2009	Cesena	1	(0)
2009–2010	Voghera	30	(22)
2010–2012	Grosseto	36	(2)
2012	Taranto	14	(0)
2012–2013	Voghera	33	(14)
2013–2014	Real Vicenza	33	(19)
2014–2015	Casertana	11	(1)
2015	Pro Piacenza	22	(8)
2015–2016	Benevento	0	(0)
2015–2016	→ Pro Piacenza (loan)	33	(3)
2016–2017	Virtus Francavilla	35	(3)
2017–2018	Pro Piacenza	34	(12)
2018–2019	Cesena	38	(18)
2019–2020	Campobasso	22	(11)
2020–2021	Seregno	33	(24)
2021–2022	Cynthialbalonga	33	(15)
2022–2023	Lumezzane	31	(20)
2023	Sambenedettese	16	(3)
2023–2024	Rieti		
2024–	Pro Palazzolo	11	(3)
- * Club domestic league appearances and goals as of 17 November 2024

Danilo Alessandro (born 3 August 1988) is an Italian professional footballer who plays as a forward for Serie D club Pro Palazzolo.

== Career ==
Born in Rome, Lazio, Alessandro started his career at Eccellenza Lazio (Italian sixth level until 2014) club Mentana Jenne, based in Jenne, in the Province of Rome. In January 2009 he was signed by Lega Pro Prima Divisione (Italian third level) club A.C. Cesena. The club finished as the champion of Group A of 2008–09 Lega Pro Prima Divisione and runner-up in 2009 Supercoppa di Lega di Prima Divisione.

In 2009, he left professional football for Voghera. He scored 22 goals in 2009–10 Serie D (Italian fifth division until 2014).

On 1 July 2010 he was signed by Serie B club Grosseto. He made 27 appearances in his maiden season in the second division, as no.88. He wore no.23 shirt in 2011–12 Serie B, which he only played 9 times.

On 13 January 2012 he was signed by Taranto of the third division. The club folded in 2012 due to financial difficulties. A new entity was admitted to 2012–13 Serie D. However Alessandro returned to Voghera instead of remained in Taranto.

In 2013 Alessandro joined Real Vicenza. He scored a goal in pre-season friendly on 3 August. On 5 August 2013 the club was admitted from 2013–14 Serie D to 2013–14 Lega Pro Seconda Divisione, to fill 1 of 7 vacancies, despite at the end of season also saw the merger of the two divisions of Lega Pro, which 18 teams instead of 9 teams would be relegated. Real Vicenza qualified for 2014–15 season as the 7th of Group A. Alessandro also scored 19 goals as team topscorer as well as joint-second topscorer of the fourth division along with Roberto Floriano (Group A) and Francesco Ripa (Group B)

On 27 July 2019, he joined Campobasso.
