= Luigi Castaldo =

Italian footballer

Personal information
- Date of birth: 2 May 1982 (age 44)
- Place of birth: Giugliano in Campania, Italy
- Height: 1.84 m (6 ft 0 in)
- Position: Forward

Team information
- Current team: Gladiator

Senior career*
Years	Team	Apps	(Gls)
2000–2001	Puteolana	10	(1)
2001–2002	Ancona	2	(0)
2002–2003	Puteolana	28	(2)
2003–2007	Juve Stabia	111	(36)
2007–2010	Benevento	76	(23)
2010–2012	Nocerina	73	(20)
2012–2018	Avellino	196	(66)
2018–2021	Casertana	72	(31)
2021–2022	Paganese	17	(4)
2023–	Gladiator	2	(0)
- * Club domestic league appearances and goals as of 8 October 2023

Luigi Castaldo (born 2 May 1982) is an Italian footballer who plays as a forward for Gladiator in the Italian Serie D.

== Career ==
Castaldo was born near Naples, and throughout his sporting career, he played on football teams in the Campania Region. Puteolana, Juve Stabia, Benevento, Nocerina and then with the Avellino.

The 2013–14 season is his 3rd season in the Italian Serie B, and the 14th since he became a professional footballer. On 24 August, he returned to score in Serie B, the first day of the season against Novara.

On 6 August 2021, he signed with Paganese.
