= Nicola Princivalli =

Italian footballer and coach

Personal information
- Date of birth: 29 September 1979 (age 47)
- Place of birth: Trieste, Italy
- Height: 1.81 m (5 ft 11 1/2 in)
- Position: Midfielder

Team information
- Current team: Cjarlins Muzane (manager)

Youth career
- Triestina

Senior career*
Years	Team	Apps	(Gls)
1997–2005	Triestina	110	(4)
2002–2004	→ Messina (loan)	47	(3)
2005–2006	Salernitana	30	(4)
2006–2007	Foggia	28	(3)
2007–2012	Triestina	96	(5)
2012–2013	Venezia	12	(0)
2013–2014	Ancona	0	(0)
2014–2015	Monfalcone	8	(2)

Managerial career
- 2016–2018: Triestina (assistant)
- 2018: Triestina
- 2019: Triestina (caretaker)
- 2021–: Cjarlins Muzane
- * Club domestic league appearances and goals

Nicola Princivalli (born 29 September 1979) is an Italian football coach and a former player. He is the head coach of Cjarlins Muzane.

== Biography ==
He made his Serie B debut in a 3–1 win over Vicenza, on 13 October 2002.

In July 2006 he joined Foggia.

In 2010–11 season he was putted to transfer window but failed to agree any transfer. In January 2011 the swap deal with Vincenzo Pepe was collapsed in January 2011. Eventually Princivalli did not play any game in 2010–11 Serie B. After the team relegated, Princivalli re-entered the squad.

In October 2012 he joined Venezia.

== Coaching career ==
On 23 September 2019, he was appointed caretaker head coach of Triestina. He was replaced by Carmine Gautieri on 14 October 2019 after 4 games with 2 wins and 2 losses.

On 27 January 2021, he was hired by Serie D club Cjarlins Muzane.
