= Igor Radrezza =

Italian footballer

Personal information
- Date of birth: 6 June 1993 (age 33)
- Place of birth: Padua, Italy
- Height: 1.72 m (5 ft 8 in)
- Position: Midfielder

Team information
- Current team: Union Clodiense Chioggia
- Number: 6

Youth career
- Padova

Senior career*
Years	Team	Apps	(Gls)
2011–2014	Padova	4	(0)
2012–2013	→ Castiglione (loan)	22	(0)
2014	Monza	8	(0)
2015	Renate	9	(1)
2015–2018	Campodarsego	98	(11)
2018–2019	Crema	30	(0)
2019–2022	Reggiana	94	(5)
2022–2024	Padova	58	(2)
2024–2025	SPAL	28	(1)
2025–	Union Clodiense Chioggia	17	(2)
- * Club domestic league appearances and goals as of 22 February 2026

Igor Radrezza (born 6 June 1993) is an Italian footballer who plays for Serie D club Union Clodiense Chioggia.

== Biography ==
Born in Martina Franca, Apulia in Southern Italy, Radrezza started his career at Northern Italy club Padova. In 2012, he was signed by Castiglione in a temporary deal. On 2 July 2014 Radrezza was signed by Monza in a 1-year deal. On 20 December he was released. On 10 January 2015 he was signed by Renate in a 6-month deal.

On 18 July 2019, he signed with newly promoted Serie C club Reggiana. With Reggio Emilia's team, he won the Serie C play-offs. He played for them also in 2020–21 Serie B, in which the team got relegated.

On 29 July 2022, Radrezza returned to Padova on a two-year contract.

On 24 July 2024, Radrezza signed a two-season contract with SPAL.
