= Simone Patacchiola =

Italian footballer

Personal information
- Date of birth: 10 February 1991 (age 35)
- Place of birth: Rieti, Italy
- Position: Defender

Team information
- Current team: Latte Dolce

Youth career
- Rieti
- 2008–2011: Sampdoria
- 2010: → Foligno (loan)

Senior career*
| Years | Team | Apps | (Gls) |
| 2011–2013 | Sampdoria | 0 | (0) |
| 2011–2012 | → Prato (loan) | 9 | (0) |
| 2012 | → Alessandria (loan) | 4 | (0) |
| 2012–2013 | → Portogruaro (loan) | 31 | (3) |
| 2013–2014 | Castiglione | 10 | (0) |
| 2014 | Selargius Calcio | 13 | (4) |
| 2014–2015 | Rieti | 11 | (1) |
| 2015 | Gualdo | | |
| 2015–2016 | Vis Subiaco | 30 | (8) |
| 2016 | Madre Pietra Daunia | 11 | (1) |
| 2016–2017 | Latte Dolce | 17 | (1) |
| 2017 | Chieti | | |
| 2017–2021 | Latte Dolce | 79 | (5) |
| 2021–2023 | Ossese | | |
| 2023– | Latte Dolce | 13 | (0) |
- * Club domestic league appearances and goals as of 20 December 2023

Simone Patacchiola (born 10 February 1991) is an Italian professional footballer who plays for Serie D club Latte Dolce as a defender.

== Biography ==
Patacchiola was a youth product of Rieti. In August 2008 he was signed by Sampdoria in temporary deal. On 8 July 2009 the Genoese club signed him outright for €80,000 in 3-year "young professional" contract. Circa 2010 his contract was extended to 30 June 2013. In 2011 Patacchiola left for Prato in temporary deal, in Lega Pro Prima Divisione (Italian third division until 2014). On 13 January 2012 he left for Alessandria in another temporary deal, in Lega Pro Seconda Divisione (Italian fourth division until 2014). On 31 August 2012 Sampietro joined third division team Portogruaro along with Gianluca Sampietro. On 18 July 2013 Patacchiola left for Castiglione outright. The club finished as the 16th of Group A, thus relegated to Serie D.
