= Andrea Doninelli =

Italian football midfielder (born 1991)

Personal information
- Full name: Andrea Doninelli
- Date of birth: April 29, 1991 (age 35)
- Place of birth: Cosenza, Italy
- Height: 1.78 m (5 ft 10 in)
- Position: Midfielder

Youth career
- –2009: Cosenza
- 2009–2011: Genoa

Senior career*
| Years | Team | Apps | (Gls) |
| 2011–2013 | Genoa | 0 | (0) |
| 2011–2012 | → Verona (loan) | 9 | (0) |
| 2012–2013 | → Juve Stabia (loan) | 12 | (1) |
| 2013–2014 | Juve Stabia | 9 | (0) |
| 2014 | Genoa | 0 | (0) |
| 2014 | → Benevento (loan) | 10 | (0) |
| 2014–2015 | Benevento | 15 | (1) |
| 2015–2016 | Modena | 12 | (0) |
| 2016–2018 | Robur Siena | 15 | (1) |
| 2017 | → Viterbese (loan) | 13 | (0) |
| 2017–2018 | → Fermana (loan) | 20 | (0) |
| 2018–2019 | Renate | 8 | (0) |
- * Club domestic league appearances and goals as of 12 February 2019

Andrea Doninelli (born 29 April 1991) is an Italian football midfielder.
