= Gianluca Sampietro =

Italian footballer

Personal information
- Date of birth: 15 March 1993 (age 33)
- Place of birth: Genoa, Italy
- Height: 1.75 m (5 ft 9 in)
- Position: Central midfielder

Team information
- Current team: Breno
- Number: 29

Youth career
- Sampdoria

Senior career*
Years	Team	Apps	(Gls)
2012–2016	Sampdoria	0	(0)
2012–2013	→ Portogruaro (loan)	28	(0)
2013–2014	→ Pisa (loan)	29	(1)
2014–2015	→ Ancona (loan)	30	(0)
2015–2016	→ Pro Patria (loan)	17	(0)
2016–2017	Taranto	18	(0)
2017–2018	Gubbio	23	(0)
2018–2019	Gozzano	5	(0)
2019–2020	Messina	14	(0)
2020–2021	Vado	11	(0)
2021–	Breno	91	(0)

International career
2011	Italy U18	2	(0)
2011	Italy U19	2	(0)
2012–2013	Italy U20	10	(0)
- * Club domestic league appearances and goals as of 20 December 2023

Gianluca Sampietro (born 15 March 1993) is an Italian footballer who plays for Serie D club Breno as a midfielder.

== Career ==
Born in Genoa, Liguria region, Sampietro started his career at one of the two Serie A club of the city — Sampdoria. In summer 2012 Sampietro was no longer eligible to the reserve as underage player, as the rule had changed from U20 to U19 event, thus, born 1992 and 1993 players were left the reserve at the same time. On 31 August 2012 Sampietro joined Portogruaro along with Simone Patacchiola. The club also loaned several players from Sampdoria. Sampietro made his debut in the second round of 2012–13 Lega Pro Prima Divisione. (Portogruaro did not have a fixture in round 1 due to 17 teams in Group A of the division).

On 8 July 2013 he left for Pisa of Lega Pro Prima Divisione in a temporary deal. On 1 September 2014 he was signed by Ancona.

On 15 September 2015 Sampietro was signed by Pro Patria in a temporary deal.

On 20 July 2019, he joined Serie D club Messina.
