= ASD Mori Santo Stefano =

Italian football club

Mori S. Stefano
- Full name: Associazione Sportiva Dilettantistica Mori Santo Stefano
- Founded: 1989
- Ground: Campo Sportivo Mori, Mori, Trentino, Italy
- Capacity: 450
- Chairman: (Italy) Luigi Bertolini
- Manager: (Italy) Mirko Colpo
- League: Serie D- Girone C
- 2023–24: Serie D- Girone C, 17th
Home colours	Away colours

Associazione Sportiva Dilettantistica Mori Santo Stefano, commonly referred to as Mori S. Stefano, is an Italian football club based in Mori, Trentino, Trentino-Alto Adige. Currently it plays in Italy's Serie D-Girone C.

== History ==
=== Foundation ===
The club was founded in 1989 after the merger of Unione Sportiva Mori (founded in 1945) and Gruppo Sportivo Santo Stefano (founded in 1961).

=== Serie D ===
In the season 2013–14 the team was promoted for the first time, from Eccellenza Trentino-Alto Adige to Serie D. However, the club relegated successively in 2015 and again in 2016. The team won the Eccellenza another time in the season 2022-2023 and is currently playing in Serie D, Girone C. In the first half of the season, dragged along by the goals of first striker Juan Ignazio Molina, the team collected 12 points and occupied the third last position, aiming to reach the playout. In the second half of the season, the sale of Molina and the poor integration of the many market purchases led to a collapse of the team, which collected only three points. The team was therefore relegated as last in the standings, collecting 3 wins, 6 draws and 25 defeats. In the 2024-2025 season, the team will play in the Eccellenza Trentino-Alto Adige league.

== Colors and badge ==
The team's colors are yellow, green and black.
