= Francesco Ripa (footballer, born 1985) =

Italian footballer

Personal information
- Date of birth: 5 November 1985 (age 40)
- Place of birth: Battipaglia, Italy
- Height: 1.79 m (5 ft 10 in)
- Position: Forward

Team information
- Current team: Battipagliese

Senior career*
Years	Team	Apps	(Gls)
2002–2004	Battipagliese	49	(11)
2004–2005	Potenza	1	(0)
2005–2009	Sorrento	115	(55)
2009–2011	Pro Patria	43	(28)
2011–2013	Nocerina	6	(0)
2011–2012	→ Como (loan)	22	(7)
2013–2014	L'Aquila	13	(2)
2013–2014	→ Arzanese (loan)	29	(19)
2014–2017	Juve Stabia	63	(26)
2017–2018	Catania	31	(7)
2018–2020	Sicula Leonzio	20	(2)
2020–2021	Juve Stabia	17	(0)
2021	Castelnuovo Vomano	13	(7)
2021–2022	Sorrento	18	(9)
2022–2024	Campobasso	27	(31)
2024–	Battipagliese	0	(0)
- * Club domestic league appearances and goals as of 5 May 2024

Francesco Ripa (born 5 November 1985) is an Italian footballer who plays as a forward for Battipagliese.

== Career ==
Born in Battipaglia, Campania, Ripa started his career at hometown club Battipagliese. After 2 Serie D seasons, he moved to Potenza of 2004–05 Serie C2 but in the mid-season returned to amateur league (Serie Dilettanti) for Sorrento, which the team won promotion in 2006 and again in 2007, thanks to his goals.

In 2009, he left for Pro Patria, and in January 2011 moved to Nocerina, winning the promotion to Serie B. At the start of 2011–12 Serie B, he was awarded no.85 shirt.

On 31 August 2011 he left for Como in temporary deal. Nocerina relegated back to the third division in 2012. However Ripa did not play any match for the Campania side. On 9 January 2013 he was signed by L'Aquila. The club won promotion from Lega Pro 2nd Division to L.P. Prime Division, the third level of Italian football. However, on 22 August he was signed by Arzanese.

He was the top-scorer of the Group B of LP Seconda Divisione in that season, 1 goal behind Massimiliano Varricchio of Group A as joint-second top-scorer of the whole fourth division, along with Danilo Alessandro, Roberto Floriano (both Group A).

In 2014–15 season he was signed by Lega Pro Divisione Unica club Juve Stabia.

On 8 January 2020 he signed with Serie C club Picerno.
