= Edoardo Defendi =

Italian footballer (born 1991)

Personal information
- Date of birth: 24 August 1991 (age 35)
- Place of birth: Trescore Balneario, Italy
- Height: 1.82 m (6 ft 0 in)
- Position: Forward

Team information
- Current team: Termoli

Youth career
- Brescia

Senior career*
Years	Team	Apps	(Gls)
2011–2014	Brescia	0	(0)
2011–2012	→ FeralpiSalò (loan)	33	(5)
2012–2013	→ San Marino (loan)	20	(1)
2013–2014	→ Como (loan)	23	(8)
2014–2015	Como	32	(7)
2015–2016	Brescia	0	(0)
2015–2016	→ Arezzo (loan)	23	(4)
2016–2017	Melfi	13	(2)
2017	Santarcangelo	10	(1)
2017–2018	Lumezzane	24	(10)
2018–2019	Cuneo	24	(9)
2019–2020	Pro Patria	14	(2)
2020–2021	Arzachena	23	(4)
2021–2022	Recanatese	29	(7)
2022–	Termoli	0	(0)
- * Club domestic league appearances and goals as of 22 May 2022

Edoardo Defendi (born 24 August 1991) is an Italian footballer. He plays for Serie D club Termoli.

== Biography ==
=== Brescia ===
Born in Trescore Balneario, Lombardy, Defendi started his career at Lombard side Brescia. Defendi spent 3 seasons on loan to various Lega Pro clubs from 2011 to 2014.

=== Como ===
On 18 June 2014 Como bought 50% registration rights from Brescia. Defendi scored 7 goals in the first edition of Lega Pro Unica Divisione plus 1 goal in semi-final match against Matera .

=== Return to Brescia ===
In June 2015 both club failed to form a deal for the price of the player, which Brescia bought back the 50% registration rights by submitting a higher bid to Lega Serie B, the mediator.

Defendi wore no.21 shirt for Brescia in 2015–16 Serie B. However, on 26 August Defendi was signed by Arezzo in a temporary deal.

=== Melfi and Santarcangelo ===
In 2016–17 season he played for Melfi in the first half; in January 2017 he moved to Santarcangelo.

=== Pro Patria ===
On 10 July 2019, he signed with Pro Patria.
