= Nicola Ferrari (footballer, born 1983) =

Italian footballer

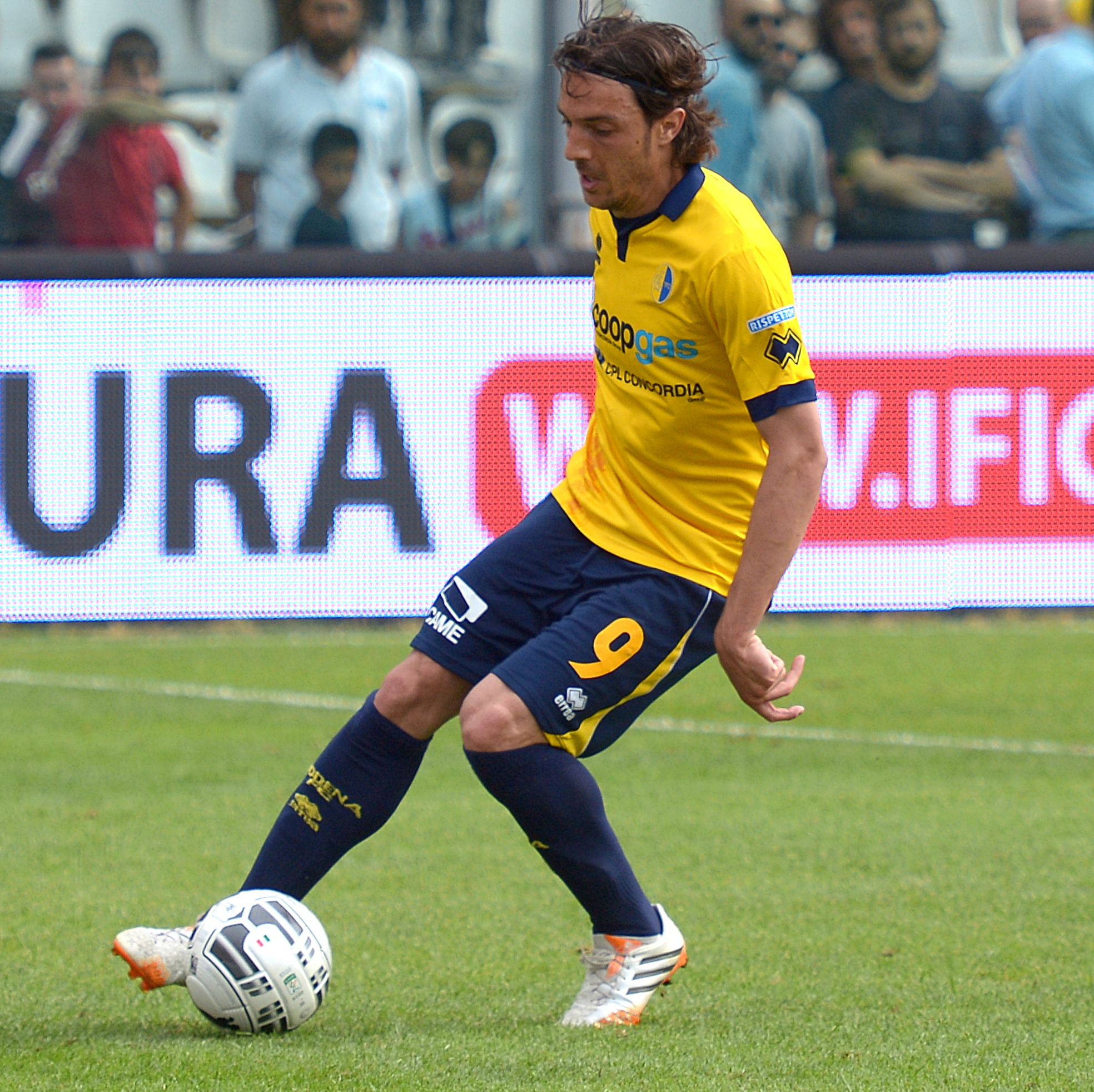

Personal information
- Date of birth: 15 July 1983 (age 43)
- Place of birth: Tione di Trento, Italy
- Height: 1.83 m (6 ft 0 in)
- Position: Forward

Team information
- Current team: Crema

Senior career*
Years	Team	Apps	(Gls)
1999–2006	Lumezzane	36	(10)
2002–2004	→ Salò (loan)	0	(0)
2005–2006	→ Crotone (loan)	29	(3)
2006–2010	AlbinoLeffe	80	(9)
2010	Pergocrema	14	(2)
2010–2014	Verona	86	(18)
2013–2014	→ Spezia (loan)	25	(7)
2014–2015	Modena	27	(1)
2015–2016	Lanciano	35	(9)
2016–2017	Venezia	26	(4)
2017–2018	Vicenza	35	(5)
2018–	Crema	0	(0)
- * Club domestic league appearances and goals as of 26 May 2018

Nicola Ferrari (born 15 July 1983) is an Italian footballer who plays as a forward for Crema.

== Club career ==
=== Lumezzane and loans ===
Ferrari made his first Serie B in a 4-0 win for Crotone over Piacenza on 4 September 2005.

=== AlbinoLeffe ===
Ferrari was signed by AlbinoLeffe on 4 July 2006 on a four-year contract for €550,000 transfer fee.

On 18 January 2010 AlbinoLeffe transferred Ferrari to Pergocrema for free.

=== Verona ===
Ferrari was signed by Verona in summer 2010.

In June 2012 he was provisionally suspended for 3 year due to 2011 Italian football scandal by a first level inquiry. His case was then under review and it was announced key witnesses will be heard by the sport judges of the Appeal Court. After defecting, it was demonstrated that he has not committed any fault at all and he was reinstated to Verona in January 2013. On 17 July 2013 he went to Spezia on a temporary deal; the following year he was transferred, outright, to Modena.

== Modena ==
Ferrari joined Modena on 18 July 2014. He was assigned number 9 shirt.

=== Late career ===
On 31 August 2015 signed a contract for Lanciano. In the summer of 2016 he moved to Venezia.

9 August 2017 Ferrari was signed by Vicenza.
