= Marco Perini =

Italian footballer (born 1985)

Personal information
- Date of birth: 19 March 1985 (age 41)
- Place of birth: Monza, Italy
- Height: 1.81 m (5 ft 11 in)
- Position: Midfielder

Team information
- Current team: Città di Sangiuliano

Youth career
- 2003–2005: Como

Senior career*
Years	Team	Apps	(Gls)
2005	Nuova Albano	12	(0)
2005–2007	Pergocrema	9	(1)
2007–2009	Biellese	70	(3)
2009–2010	Seregno	0	(0)
2010–2013	Carpi	99	(6)
2013–2014	Bellaria Igea	16	(0)
2014	Grosseto	10	(0)
2014–2015	Monza	14	(0)
2015	Renate	15	(0)
2015–2016	AlbinoLeffe	26	(0)
2016–2018	Monza	35	(1)
2018	Folgore Caratese	9	(0)
2018–2019	Fenegrò Calcio	15	(1)
2019–	Città di Sangiuliano		
- * Club domestic league appearances and goals as of 17:59, 10 November 2019 (UTC)

Marco Perini (born 19 March 1985) is an Italian footballer who plays for ASD Città di Sangiuliano.

== Career ==
In summer 2019, Perini joined ASD Città di Sangiuliano both as a player and youth coach.

== Honours ==
=== Club ===
Monza

- Serie D: 2016-17
- Scudetto Dilettanti: 2016-17
