= Fabio Concas =

Italian footballer

Personal information
- Date of birth: 17 November 1986 (age 39)
- Place of birth: Genoa, Italy
- Height: 1.68 m (5 ft 6 in)
- Position: Winger

Team information
- Current team: Derthona

Senior career*
Years	Team	Apps	(Gls)
2004–2007	Savona	72	(11)
2007–2008	Carrarese	31	(9)
2008–2010	Ternana	73	(9)
2011	Varese	15	(2)
2011–2015	Carpi	109	(22)
2016–2019	Carpi	51	(6)
2019–2020	Gozzano	4	(0)
2020–	Derthona	0	(0)
- * Club domestic league appearances and goals as of 22 February 2020

Fabio Concas (born 17 November 1986) is an Italian footballer who plays for the Serie D side Derthona as a winger.

== Career ==
Born in Genoa, Liguria, Concas started his career at Serie D team Savona from nearby town. In 2007–08 season he was signed by Carrarese (in co-ownership deal from Lucchese) and on 1 September 2008 signed by Ternana.

In January 2011 he was signed by Serie B club Varese in a 1 1/2-year contract.

On 20 July 2011 he was signed by Carpi in another co-ownership deal.

On 7 September 2013 he scored a goal that made him part of history: it was the first goal scored by Carpi in Serie B.

In January 2015, it was revealed that Concas had tested positive for Cocaine metabolite Benzoylecgonine following a routine anti-doping test that took place after the 1-0 victory over rivals Modena on 13 December 2014. On 20 January 2015, Carpi announced the termination of Concas' contract, Concas' final game for the Biancorossi was the 1-1 draw with Virtus Lanciano on 19 December 2014.

On 25 July 2019, he joined Gozzano on a 2-year contract.

On 1 September 2020 he signed with Derthona.
