= Diego Reis =

Brazilian footballer (born 1986)

Personal information
- Full name: Diego da Silva Reis
- Date of birth: 20 February 1986 (age 40)
- Place of birth: Itapemirim, Espírito Santo, Brazil
- Height: 1.86 m (6 ft 1 in)
- Position: Forward

Team information
- Current team: Prato

Youth career
- Campo Grande
- 2000: Bologna
- 2001–2005: Chievo

Senior career*
Years	Team	Apps	(Gls)
2005–2008	Chievo	0	(0)
2005–2006	→ Bellaria (loan)	32	(9)
2006–2007	→ Cremonese (loan)	12	(1)
2007–2008	→ Prato (loan)	43	(6)
2008–	Prato	177	(27)
- * Club domestic league appearances and goals

Diego da Silva Reis (born 20 February 1986) is a Brazilian footballer who plays as a forward for Lega Pro Prima Divisione club Prato.

== Career ==
Born in Itapemirim, Espírito Santo, Reis started his career with Rio de Janeiro club Campo Grande. In 2000, he left for Italian team Bologna along with Diego Oliveira and Claiton dos Santos, later moved to Chievo along with Diego Oliveira.

In 2005–06 season he left for Serie C2 side Bellaria – Igea Marina. In the next season he left for Serie C1 club Cremonese. In January 2007, Reis was loaned back to Serie C2, for Prato. The loan was extended in summer 2007 and Reis became a regular starter of the team that season. In June 2008 Prato signed him in co-ownership deal. In 2008–09 season he scored 5 league goals and in June 2009 Prato bought him outright by winning an auction between the two clubs.
