= Marcello Cottafava =

Italian footballer

Personal information
- Date of birth: 8 September 1977 (age 49)
- Place of birth: Genoa, Italy
- Height: 1.84 m (6 ft 0 in)
- Position: Defender

Senior career*
| Years | Team | Apps | (Gls) |
| 1997–1998 | FBC Saronno | 29 | (0) |
| 1998–2001 | Carrarese | 77 | (3) |
| 2001–2002 | Lecco | 25 | (1) |
| 2002–2007 | Treviso | 99 | (4) |
| 2003–2004 | → Giulianova (loan) | 14 | (0) |
| 2007–2008 | Lecce | 48 | (1) |
| 2008–2011 | Triestina | 97 | (3) |
| 2011–2012 | Gubbio | 34 | (2) |
| 2012–2015 | Latina | 79 | (5) |
| 2015–2016 | SPAL | 40 | (3) |
- * Club domestic league appearances and goals

Marcello Cottafava (born 8 September 1977) is a former Italian footballer who played as a defender, and a current coach.

== Career ==
He started his career at Sampdoria and promoted to the first team in 1996, but failed to make his appearances in Serie A. From 1997 to 2004 he played in Serie C1 with Saronno, Carrarese, Lecco, Treviso and Giulianova.

=== Treviso ===
After loaned to Giulianova, Cottafava returned to Treviso in 2004. He also made his first debut for Serie A on 11 September 2005, after the club get promote to first division.

=== Lecce ===
The 2006–07 season began with Treviso, in the cadet series, and he moved to Lecce, a Serie B club, in January. He started for the rest of the league, until he was cautioned for an alleged doping case. On 21 June he was acquitted for not committing the crime: he had used a nasal spray, which had caused an alleged doping effect.

=== Triestina ===
On 1 September 2008 he moved to Triestina, where he scored 3 goals in 77 appearances in two seasons. In the pre-season of the 2010–11 season he was put out of the squad by Triestina and then reinstated in January. In July, he rescinded his contract with the Halberd company.

=== Gubbio ===
On 22 September 2011, he joined Gubbio. On 5 October 2011, he scored his first goal for Eugubini in a 2–2 match against Brescia. On 5 November, he recovered his first expulsion in a 3–1 defeat against L.R. Vicenza at 58 minutes, with the result still 1–1. He finished the season relegating with 34 appearances and 2 goals.

=== Latina ===
On 29 August 2012, he signed an annual contract with Latina. On 30 September 2012 in Viareggio-Latina scored a valuable mark by kicking a penalty of about 40 meters that surprises the goalkeeper opponent signing the temporary advantage of the team Pontine. The game will then end with a 1–1 result. He is among the protagonists of the Pontine team that on 16 June 2013, beating Pisa 3–1 in the Playoff final of the League First Division, conquers the first historic promotion in Serie B. On 10 July 2013 he renewed for a year participating in the first B series championship in the history of Latina. On 14 December 2013 in the match against Crotone found his first goal of the season with a diagonal shot on the developments of a corner. He became captain of the team that finished third in the standings behind Empoli and Palermo. He participated in the playoffs to go to Serie A. He won the semi-final with in Bari losing only the final against Cesena not being able to crown the dream of double promotion.

=== S.P.A.L. ===
On 14 January 2015, Cottafava joined SPAL, a club in Serie C. On 14 May 2016, he announced his retirement from football.

== Managerial career ==
In 2016, he coached the SPAL Under-17, where he helped his club to promote to first division in 2017. On 7 September 2017, he successfully passed UEFA coaching exam that allows him to train all the youth and to be assistant coach in Serie A and Serie B. In the Spring 2 Championship 2017–2018 he placed fifth at a point from the playoffs. In the following year, he finished second in Group A and lost the play-off final against Lazio.

On 1 July 2019, he became coach of Sampdoria's Primavera side, signing a contract until 30 June 2020. With the suspension of the championship due to the emergency COVID-19 the team stops at the 7th place in the standings in the play-off area.

In the summer of 2020, Cottafava moved to coach Torino's peers.

In October 2022, he obtained the UEFA Pro license, the highest training level for a coach.
