= 2007–08 Juventus FC season =

Italian football club season

Juventus
2007–08 season
- Chairman: Giovanni Cobolli Gigli
- Manager: Claudio Ranieri
- Stadium: Stadio Olimpico di Torino
- Serie A: 3rd
- Coppa Italia: Quarter-finals
- Top goalscorer: League: Alessandro Del Piero (21); All: Alessandro Del Piero (24)
- Average home league attendance: 20,930
Home colours	Away colours	Third colours

The 2007–08 season was Juventus's 110th in existence and their first season back in the top flight of Italian football.

== Season review ==
On 4 June 2007, Claudio Ranieri was appointed the new manager following the resignation of Didier Deschamps. With the club back in Serie A, new signings such as Czech international Zdeněk Grygera, Portuguese midfielder Tiago Mendes and Sergio Almirón were brought in to strengthen the squad while promising youngsters such as Sebastian Giovinco, Claudio Marchisio and Paolo De Ceglie were sent out on loan or co-ownership deals.

Juventus finished third that season to qualify for next season's Champions League, their first participation in that competition since 2005–06.

== Players ==
=== Squad information ===
Note: Flags indicate national team as defined under FIFA eligibility rules; some limited exceptions apply. Players may hold more than one non-FIFA nationality.

No.	Pos.	Nation	Player
1	GK	ITA	Gianluigi Buffon
2	DF	ITA	Alessandro Birindelli
3	DF	ITA	Giorgio Chiellini
4	MF	ARG	Sergio Almirón
5	DF	FRA	Jonathan Zebina
6	MF	ITA	Cristiano Zanetti
7	MF	BIH	Hasan Salihamidžić
8	MF	ITA	Mauro Camoranesi
9	FW	ITA	Vincenzo Iaquinta
10	FW	ITA	Alessandro Del Piero (captain)
11	MF	CZE	Pavel Nedvěd
12	GK	ITA	Emanuele Belardi
13	GK	AUS	Jess Vanstrattan
14	DF	POR	Jorge Andrade
17	FW	FRA	David Trezeguet
18	DF	FRA	Jean-Alain Boumsong
19	DF	ITA	Domenico Criscito
20	FW	ITA	Raffaele Palladino
21	DF	CZE	Zdeněk Grygera

No.	Pos.	Nation	Player
22	MF	MLI	Mohamed Sissoko
23	MF	ITA	Antonio Nocerino
24	FW	URU	Rubén Olivera
25	DF	ITA	Guglielmo Stendardo
28	DF	ITA	Cristian Molinaro
30	MF	POR	Tiago
31	GK	ITA	Cristiano Novembre
32	MF	ITA	Marco Marchionni
33	DF	ITA	Nicola Legrottaglie
34	MF	ITA	Cristian Pasquato
35	MF	ITA	Simone Esposito
36	MF	ITA	Luca Castiglia
37	DF	ITA	Marco Duravia
38	DF	ITA	Salvatore D'Elia
41	MF	ITA	Nicola Cosentini
42	FW	SOM	Ayub Daud
43	DF	ITA	Lorenzo Ariaudo
44	FW	ITA	Donato Bottone
45	FW	MAR	Oussama Essabr

=== Transfers ===
In
Pos.	Name	from	Type
GK	Jess Kedwell Vanstrattan	Hellas Verona	loan
DF	Domenico Criscito	Genoa	riscatto comp.
DF	Daniele Gastaldello	Siena	riscatto comp. (€650,000)
DF	Zdeněk Grygera	Ajax	end of contract
DF	Jorge Andrade	Deportivo La Coruña	(€10.5 million)
DF	Cristian Molinaro	Siena	co-ownership (€2.5 million)
MF	Sergio Bernardo Almirón	Empoli	(€9 million)
MF	Antonio Nocerino	Piacenza	co-ownership (€3.7 million)
MF	Hasan Salihamidžić	Bayern Munich	released
MF	Tiago Mendes	Lyon	(€13.65 million)
FW	Vincenzo Iaquinta	Udinese	(€11.25 million)
FW	Rubén Olivera	Sampdoria	loan ended
FW	Francesco Volpe	Ravenna	co-ownership (€1 million)

Out
Pos.	Name	to	Type
GK	Antonio Mirante	Sampdoria	loan
DF	Federico Balzaretti	Fiorentina	(€3.8 million)
DF	Daniele Gastaldello	Sampdoria	(€1.25 million)
DF	Robert Kovač	Borussia Dortmund	Free
DF	Igor Tudor	Hajduk Split	Free
DF	Felice Piccolo	Empoli	co-ownership (€125,000)
DF	Andrea Rossi	Siena	co-ownership (€400,000)
MF	Simone Bentivoglio	Chievo	end of co-ownership (€500,000)
MF	Manuele Blasi	Napoli	co-ownership (€2.45 million)
MF	Raffaele Bianco	Bari	loan
MF	Viktor Budjanskij	Ascoli	end of co-ownership (€900,000)
MF	Paolo De Ceglie	Siena	co-ownership (€1.25 million)
MF	Andrea Gasbarroni	Parma	(€1.5 million)
MF	Giuliano Giannichedda	Livorno	Free
MF	Sebastian Giovinco	Empoli	loan
MF	Olivier Kapo	Birmingham City	(€2.3 million)
MF	Claudio Marchisio	Empoli	loan
MF	Matteo Paro	Genoa	co-ownership (€1.5 million)
MF	Alessio Tacchinardi		released
MF	Dario Venitucci	Treviso	loan
FW	Valerij Bojinov	Fiorentina	loan ended
FW	Tomás Guzmán	Piacenza	co-ownership (€450,000)
FW	Davide Lanzafame	Bari	loan
FW	Fabrizio Miccoli	Palermo	(€4.3 million)
FW	Michele Paolucci	Udinese	co-ownership (€1.35 million)
FW	Rej Volpato	Empoli	co-ownership (€500,000)
FW	Francesco Volpe	Livorno	co-ownership (€1 million)
FW	Francesco Volpe	Ravenna	co-ownership (€450,000)
FW	Marcelo Zalayeta	Napoli	co-ownership (€1.4 million)

==== Winter ====
In
Pos.	Name	from	Type
DF	Guglielmo Stendardo	Lazio	loan
MF	Mohamed Sissoko	Liverpool	(€11 million)

Out
Pos.	Name	to	Type
DF	Jean-Alain Boumsong	Lyon	(€3 million)
DF	Domenico Criscito	Genoa	loan
MF	Sergio Bernardo Almirón	Monaco	loan
FW	Rubén Olivera	Peñarol	loan

== Competitions ==
=== Serie A ===
==== League table ====
Pos	Team	Pld	W	D	L	GF	GA	GD	Pts	Qualification or relegation
1	Internazionale (C)	38	25	10	3	69	26	+43	85	Qualification to Champions League group stage
2	Roma	38	24	10	4	72	37	+35	82	Qualification to Champions League group stage
3	Juventus	38	20	12	6	72	37	+35	72	Qualification to Champions League third qualifying round
4	Fiorentina	38	19	9	10	55	39	+16	66	Qualification to Champions League third qualifying round
5	Milan	38	18	10	10	66	38	+28	64	Qualification to UEFA Cup first round (Note: The 7th-placed team qualified for the UEFA Cup due to both of the Coppa Italia finalists, Roma and Internazionale, finishing 6th or higher.)

Source: Serie A
Rules for classification: 1) points; 2) head-to-head points; 3) head-to-head goal difference; 4) head-to-head goals scored; 5) goal difference; 6) number of goals scored.
(C) Champions

==== Results by round ====
Round	1	2	3	4	5	6	7	8	9	10	11	12	13	14	15	16	17	18	19	20	21	22	23	24	25	26	27	28	29	30	31	32	33	34	35	36	37	38
Ground	H	A	H	A	H	A	A	H	A	H	H	A	H	A	H	A	H	A	H	A	H	A	H	A	H	H	A	H	A	A	H	A	H	A	H	A	H	A
Result	W	W	L	D	W	W	D	W	L	W	D	D	W	D	W	W	W	D	D	W	D	W	W	L	D	L	W	W	D	W	W	L	W	W	W	L	D	D
Position	1	1	4	6	3	2	2	2	4	3	4	4	3	3	3	3	3	3	3	3	3	3	3	3	3	3	3	3	3	3	3	3	3	3	3	3	3	3

Source: Competitive matches
= Qualification to Champions League group stage; = Qualification to Champions League third qualifying round; = Qualification to UEFA Cup first round; = Qualification to Intertoto Cup third round; = Relegation to Serie B

==== Matches ====
25 August 2007 1	Juventus	5–1	Livorno	Turin
	Trezeguet 29', 87', 90+2'; Iaquinta 71' (pen.), 86'	Report	Loviso 90+4'	Stadium: Stadio Olimpico; Referee: Gabriele Gava

2 September 2007 2	Cagliari	2–3	Juventus	Cagliari
	Foggia 55' (pen.), 80' (pen.)	Report	Trezeguet 53'; Del Piero 76'; Chiellini 90'	Stadium: Stadio Sant'Elia; Referee: Paolo Tagliavento

16 September 2007 3	Juventus	0–1	Udinese	Turin
		Report	Di Natale 47'	Stadium: Stadio Olimpico; Referee: Stefano Farina

23 September 2007 4	Roma	2–2	Juventus	Rome
	Totti 30', 36'	Report	Trezeguet 17'; Del Piero (penalty missed) 49'; Iaquinta 88'	Stadium: Stadio Olimpico; Referee: Emidio Morganti

26 September 2007 5	Juventus	4–0	Reggina	Turin
	Legrottaglie 48'; Salihamidžić 50'; Trezeguet 76'; Palladino 90+1'	Report		Stadium: Stadio Olimpico; Referee: Domenico Celi

30 September 2007 6	Torino	0–1	Juventus	Turin
		Report	Trezeguet 90+3'	Stadium: Stadio Olimpico; Referee: Gianluca Rocchi

7 October 2007 7	Fiorentina	1–1	Juventus	Florence
	Mutu 89' (pen.)	Report	Iaquinta 23'	Stadium: Stadio Artemio Franchi; Referee: Nicola Rizzoli

21 October 2007 8	Juventus	1–0	Genoa	Turin
	Del Piero 36'	Report		Stadium: Stadio Olimpico; Referee: Luca Banti

27 October 2007 9	Napoli	3–1	Juventus	Naples
	Gargano 49'; Domizzi 62' (pen.), 70' (pen.)	Report	Del Piero 46'	Stadium: Stadio San Paolo; Referee: Mauro Bergonzi

31 October 2007 10	Juventus	3–0	Empoli	Turin
	Trezeguet 51' (pen.), 62', 70'	Report		Stadium: Stadio Olimpico; Referee: Domenico Celi

4 November 2007 11	Juventus	1–1	Internazionale	Turin
	Camoranesi 77'	Report	Cruz 41'	Stadium: Stadio Olimpico; Referee: Gianluca Rocchi

11 November 2007 12	Parma	2–2	Juventus	Parma
	Gasbarroni 43' (pen.); Pisanu 57'	Report	Legrottaglie 75'; Iaquinta 82'	Stadium: Stadio Ennio Tardini; Referee: Gabriele Gava

25 November 2007 13	Juventus	5–0	Palermo	Turin
	Trezeguet 29'; Iaquinta 41'; Del Piero 71', 90+2' (pen.); Marchionni 76'	Report		Stadium: Stadio Olimpico; Referee: Massimiliano Saccani

1 December 2007 14	AC Milan	0–0	Juventus	Milan
		Report		Stadium: San Siro; Referee: Emidio Morganti

9 December 2007 15	Juventus	1–0	Atalanta	Turin
	Nedvěd 86'	Report		Stadium: Stadio Olimpico; Referee: Daniele Orsato

15 December 2007 16	Lazio	2–3	Juventus	Rome
	Pandev 36', 90+3'	Report	Trezeguet 29'; Del Piero 48', 70'	Stadium: Stadio Olimpico; Referee: Christian Brighi

23 December 2007 17	Juventus	2–0	Siena	Turin
	Salihamidžić 32'; Trezeguet 59'	Report		Stadium: Stadio Olimpico; Referee: Antonio Damato

12 January 2008 18	Catania	1–1	Juventus	Catania
	Spinesi 15'	Report	Del Piero 90+1' (pen.)	Stadium: Stadio Angelo Massimino; Referee: Gianluca Rocchi

20 January 2008 19	Juventus	0–0	Sampdoria	Turin
		Report		Stadium: Stadio Olimpico; Referee: Massimiliano Saccani

27 January 2008 20	Livorno	1–3	Juventus	Livorno
	Bogdani 79'	Report	Trezeguet 30', 63'; Del Piero 49'	Stadium: Stadio Armando Picchi; Referee: Emidio Morganti

3 February 2008 21	Juventus	1–1	Cagliari	Turin
	Nedvěd 56'	Report	Bianco 55'	Stadium: Stadio Olimpico; Referee: Antonio Giannoccaro

10 February 2008 22	Udinese	1–2	Juventus	Udine
	Dossena 6'	Report	Camoranesi 60'; Iaquinta 75'	Stadium: Stadio Friuli; Referee: Gianluca Rocchi

16 February 2008 23	Juventus	1–0	Roma	Turin
	Del Piero 45'	Report		Stadium: Stadio Olimpico; Referee: Massimiliano Saccani

23 February 2008 24	Reggina	2–1	Juventus	Reggio Calabria
	Brienza 32'; Amoruso 90+2' (pen.)	Report	Del Piero 72'	Stadium: Stadio Oreste Granillo; Referee: Paolo Dondarini

26 February 2008 25	Juventus	0–0	Torino	Turin
		Report		Stadium: Stadio Olimpico; Referee: Nicola Rizzoli

2 March 2008 26	Juventus	2–3	Fiorentina	Turin
	Sissoko 29'; Camoranesi 57'	Report	Gobbi 19'; Papa Waigo 75'; Osvaldo 90+3'	Stadium: Stadio Olimpico; Referee: Stefano Farina

9 March 2008 27	Genoa	0–2	Juventus	Genoa
		Report	Grygera 25'; Trezeguet 33'	Stadium: Stadio Luigi Ferraris; Referee: Emidio Morganti

16 March 2008 28	Juventus	1–0	Napoli	Turin
	Iaquinta 88'	Report		Stadium: Stadio Olimpico; Referee: Gianluca Rocchi

19 March 2008 29	Empoli	0–0	Juventus	Empoli
		Report		Stadium: Stadio Carlo Castellani; Referee: Nicola Rizzoli

22 March 2008 30	Internazionale	1–2	Juventus	Milan
	Maniche 83'	Report	Camoranesi 49'; Trezeguet 63'	Stadium: San Siro; Referee: Stefano Farina

6 April 2008 32	Palermo	3–2	Juventus	Palermo
	Amauri 11', 45+5'; Cassani 89'	Report	Del Piero 52', 71'	Stadium: Stadio Renzo Barbera; Referee: Emidio Morganti

13 April 2008 33	Juventus	3–2	AC Milan	Turin
	Del Piero 12'; Salihamidžić 45', 80'	Report	Inzaghi 14', 31'	Stadium: Stadio Olimpico; Referee: Gianluca Rocchi

16 April 2008 31	Juventus	3–0	Parma	Turin
	Trezeguet 17'; Palladino 30'; Morrone 77' (o.g.)			Stadium: Stadio Olimpico; Referee: Luca Banti
Note: The match was rescheduled from March 30 due to the death of a Parma fan in a road accident.

20 April 2008 34	Atalanta	0–4	Juventus	Bergamo
		Report	Legrottaglie 1'; Del Piero 6', 34', 65'	Stadium: Stadio Atleti Azzurri d'Italia; Referee: Matteo Trefoloni

27 April 2008 35	Juventus	5–2	Lazio	Turin
	Chiellini 15', 88'; Camoranesi 21'; Del Piero 32'; Trezeguet 33'	Report	Bianchi 56'; Siviglia 61'	Stadium: Stadio Olimpico; Referee: Andrea Gervasoni

4 May 2008 36	Siena	1–0	Juventus	Siena
	Kharja 7'	Report		Stadium: Stadio Artemio Franchi - Montepaschi Arena; Referee: Daniele Orsato

11 May 2008 37	Juventus	1–1	Catania	Turin
	Del Piero 89'	Report	Martínez 48'	Stadium: Stadio Olimpico; Referee: Matteo Trefoloni

17 May 2008 38	Sampdoria	3–3	Juventus	Genoa
	Molinaro 21' (o.g.); Maggio 40'; Cassano (penalty missed) 45+1'; Montella 80'	Report	Del Piero 6', 65' (pen.); Trezeguet 15' (pen.)	Stadium: Stadio Luigi Ferraris; Referee: Paolo Valeri
Note: The match was rescheduled from May 18 due to the Pope's visit to Genoa.

=== Coppa Italia ===
==== Third Round ====
29 August 2007 Third round	Parma	1–3	Juventus	Parma
21:00 CEST	Castellini 75' (pen.)		Molinaro 62'; Almirón 73'; Salihamidžić 82'	Stadium: Stadio Ennio Tardini; Referee: Mauro Bergonzi

==== Round of 16 ====
6 December 2007 First leg	Empoli	2–1	Juventus	Empoli
20:45 CET	Pozzi 20'; Abate 51'		Iaquinta 81'	Stadium: Stadio Carlo Castellani; Referee: Stefano Farina

15 January 2008 Second leg	Juventus	5–3 (6–5 agg.)	Empoli	Turin
20:45 CET	Marchionni 5'; Nedvěd 9'; Iaquinta 48', 60'; Del Piero 76' (pen.)		Antonini 32'; Pozzi 45+1', 50'	Stadium: Stadio Olimpico di Torino; Referee: Andrea Gervasoni

==== Quarter-finals ====
23 January 2008 First leg	Internazionale	2–2	Juventus	Milan
21:00 CET	Cruz 53', 74'		Del Piero 79'; Boumsong 85'	Stadium: San Siro; Referee: Stefano Farina

30 January 2008 Second leg	Juventus	2–3 (4–5 agg.)	Internazionale	Turin
21:00 CET	Del Piero 14'; Iaquinta 31'		Balotelli 10', 53'; Cruz 39'	Stadium: Stadio Olimpico; Referee: Massimiliano Saccani

== Statistics ==
=== Players statistics ===
No.	Pos	Nat	Player	Total		2007–08 Serie A		2007–08 Coppa Italia	
No.	Pos	Nat	Player	Apps	Goals	Apps	Goals	Apps	Goals
1	GK	(Italy) ITA	Gianluigi Buffon	35	0	34			
21	DF	(Czech Republic) CZE	Zdeněk Grygera	27	1	22+2	1	3	0
3	DF	(Italy) ITA	Giorgio Chiellini	32	3	30	3	2	0
28	DF	(Italy) ITA	Cristian Molinaro	36	1	30+1	0	5	1
33	DF	(Italy) ITA	Nicola Legrottaglie	37	3	31+2	3	4	0
23	MF	(Italy) ITA	Antonio Nocerino	36	0	23+9	0	4	0
6	MF	(Italy) ITA	Cristiano Zanetti	29	0	26	0	3	0
7	MF	(Bosnia and Herzegovina) BIH	Hasan Salihamidžić	30	4	21+5	4	4	0
11	MF	(Czech Republic) CZE	Pavel Nedvěd	33	3	28+3	2	2	1
17	FW	(France) FRA	David Trezeguet	39	20	35+1	20	3	0
10	FW	(Italy) ITA	Alessandro Del Piero	41	24	32+5	21	4	3
12	GK	(Italy) ITA	Emanuele Belardi	9	-17	4+1	-7	4	-10
8	MF	(Argentina) ARG	Mauro Camoranesi	23	5	18+4	5	1	0
20	FW	(Italy) ITA	Raffaele Palladino	31	2	14+12	2	5	0
5	DF	(France) FRA	Jonathan Zebina	17	0	14+2	0	1	0
22	MF	(Mali) MLI	Mohamed Sissoko	15	1	12+3	1	0	0
30	MF	(Portugal) POR	Tiago	23	0	10+10	0	3	0
9	FW	(Italy) ITA	Vincenzo Iaquinta	29	12	9+15	8	5	4
19	DF	(Italy) ITA	Domenico Criscito	9	0	8	0	1	0
4	MF	(Argentina) ARG	Sergio Almirón	11	1	5+4	0	2	1
2	DF	(Italy) ITA	Alessandro Birindelli	11	1	4+3	0	4	1
14	DF	(Portugal) POR	Jorge Andrade	5	0	4	0	1	0
25	DF	(Italy) ITA	Guglielmo Stendardo	6	0	3+2	0	1	0
32	MF	(Italy) ITA	Marco Marchionni	14	2	1+10	1	3	1
36	MF	(Italy) ITA	Luca Castiglia	2	0	0+2	0	0	0
34	MF	(Italy) ITA	Cristian Pasquato	1	0	0+1	0	0	0
24	FW	(Uruguay) URU	Rubén Olivera	1	0	0+1	0	0	0
18	DF	(France) FRA	Jean-Alain Boumsong	3	1	0	0	3	1
13	GK	(Australia) AUS	Jess Vanstrattan						
31	GK	(Italy) ITA	Cristiano Novembre						
35	MF	(Italy) ITA	Simone Esposito						
37	DF	(Italy) ITA	Marco Duravia						
38	DF	(Italy) ITA	Salvatore D'Elia						
41	MF	(Italy) ITA	Nicola Cosentini						
42	FW	(Somalia) SOM	Ayub Daud						
43	DF	(Italy) ITA	Lorenzo Ariaudo						
44	FW	(Italy) ITA	Donato Bottone						
45	FW	(Morocco) MAR	Oussama Essabr						

- Source: http://calcio-seriea.net/presenze/2007/1316/
