= 2006–07 Juventus FC season =

Italian football club season

Juventus
2006–07 season
- President: Giovanni Cobolli Gigli
- Manager: Didier Deschamps (until 26 May 2007); Giancarlo Corradini (caretaker)
- Stadium: Stadio Olimpico di Torino
- Serie B: 1st (promoted)
- Coppa Italia: Third round
- Top goalscorer: League: Alessandro Del Piero (20); All: Alessandro Del Piero (23)
- Average home league attendance: 18,085
Home colours	Away colours	Third colours

The 2006–07 season was Juventus's 109th season in existence and first season in its history in Serie B following the Calciopoli scandal, leaving Internazionale as the only Italian club never to have been relegated. Juventus were docked nine points this season (repealed from the original 30-point deduction). Juventus finished the Serie B season in first place and were thus promoted back up to Serie A.

Following the enforced relegation, Juventus lost Fabio Cannavaro and Emerson to Real Madrid, Lilian Thuram and Gianluca Zambrotta to Barcelona, Adrian Mutu to Fiorentina, and Patrick Vieira and Zlatan Ibrahimović to Internazionale. Other players stayed at the club, however, including Alessandro Del Piero, Gianluigi Buffon, Giorgio Chiellini, Pavel Nedvěd, David Trezeguet, Marcelo Zalayeta, and Mauro Camoranesi, for the following 2006–07 Serie B season.

== Squad ==
Squad at end of season

Note: Flags indicate national team as defined under FIFA eligibility rules; some limited exceptions apply. Players may hold more than one non-FIFA nationality.

No.	Pos.	Nation	Player
1	GK	ITA	Gianluigi Buffon
2	DF	ITA	Alessandro Birindelli
3	DF	ITA	Giorgio Chiellini
6	DF	CRO	Robert Kovač
7	DF	ITA	Gianluca Pessotto
8	MF	ITA	Giuliano Giannichedda
9	FW	BUL	Valeri Bojinov
10	FW	ITA	Alessandro Del Piero (captain)
11	MF	CZE	Pavel Nedvěd
12	GK	ITA	Antonio Mirante
13	DF	ITA	Felice Piccolo
14	DF	ITA	Federico Balzaretti
15	MF	ITA	Claudio Marchisio
16	MF	ITA	Mauro Camoranesi
17	FW	FRA	David Trezeguet

No.	Pos.	Nation	Player
18	DF	FRA	Jean-Alain Boumsong
19	MF	ITA	Matteo Paro
20	FW	ITA	Raffaele Palladino
22	GK	ITA	Emanuele Belardi
25	FW	URU	Marcelo Zalayeta
27	DF	FRA	Jonathan Zebina
29	DF	ITA	Paolo De Ceglie
30	DF	ITA	Nicola Legrottaglie
32	MF	ITA	Marco Marchionni
40	MF	ITA	Dario Venitucci
42	MF	ITA	Raffaele Bianco
43	FW	ITA	Sebastian Giovinco
44	FW	ITA	Michele Paolucci
45	GK	ITA	Matteo Trini

== Transfers ==
In
Pos.	Name	from	Type
MF	Cristiano Zanetti	Inter	
FW	Valeri Bojinov	Fiorentina	loan
DF	Jean-Alain Boumsong	Newcastle United	
MF	Matteo Paro	Chievo	
MF	Raffaele Palladino	Livorno	loan ended
GK	Antonio Mirante	Siena	loan ended
DF	Nicola Legrottaglie	Siena	loan ended

Out
Pos.	Name	to	Type
FW	Zlatan Ibrahimovic	Inter	
MF	Patrick Vieira	Inter	
DF	Fabio Cannavaro	Real Madrid	
MF	Emerson Ferreira	Real Madrid	
DF	Lilian Thuram	Barcelona	
DF	Gianluca Zambrotta	Barcelona	
GK	Christian Abbiati	A.C. Milan	loan ended
FW	Adrian Mutu	Fiorentina	
MF	Manuele Blasi	Fiorentina	loan
GK	Landry Bonnefoi	Metz	loan
MF	Rubén Olivera	Sampdoria	loan

=== Winter ===
In
Pos.	Name	from	Type

Out
Pos.	Name	to	Type
FW	Tomás Guzmán	Siena	loan

== Events ==
In July 2006, former player Didier Deschamps was announced as the new manager following the resignation of Fabio Capello, who left for Spanish club Real Madrid.

The club made its Serie B debut on 9 September 2006, earning their first ever point in Serie B with a 1–1 draw away to Rimini. After that, Juventus won its next eight games, scoring 16 goals and conceding just one. The winning streak ended with a 1–1 draw at Napoli. In that game, goalkeeper Gianluigi Buffon's streak of not conceding a goal ended at 733 minutes. Against Albinoleffe, Buffon was shown the red card for the first time in his career and conceded a penalty, but a 10-man Juve team managed to draw the game. They were undefeated in Serie B until the team lost at Mantova on 14 January 2007.

On 15 December 2006, two Berretti (U-18) youth players Alessio Ferramosca, age 17, and Riccardo Neri, age 16, drowned in a pond at the club's training ground in Vinovo, apparently when trying to recover a football that had fallen into the ice-cold water. The Juventus vs Cesena (Serie B) game scheduled for that day was cancelled and postponed until January due to the tragedy.

On 19 May 2007, after a 5–1 away win at Arezzo on the 39th matchday, Juventus confirmed their promotion to Serie A. On Matchday 40, Juventus were then crowned Serie B champions following a 2–0 home win to Mantova On 26 May, it was confirmed that Deschamps had resigned as manager due to differences with the club hierarchy, especially director of football Alessio Secco. His assistant Giancarlo Corradini was appointed caretaker for the last two games. On 4 June, Claudio Ranieri was announced as the new manager on the club website as Corradini stepped down to take up another management job full-time.

== Squad statistics ==
=== Appearances and goals ===
No.	Pos	Nat	Player	Total		Serie B		Coppa Italia	
No.	Pos	Nat	Player	Apps	Goals	Apps	Goals	Apps	Goals
1	GK	(Italy) ITA	Gianluigi Buffon	40	-25	37	-21	3	-4
2	DF	(Italy) ITA	Alessandro Birindelli	40	1	29+8	1	2+1	0
3	DF	(Italy) ITA	Giorgio Chiellini	35	4	29+3	3	3	1
18	DF	(France) FRA	Jean-Alain Boumsong	33	2	31+2	2	0	0
14	DF	(Italy) ITA	Federico Balzaretti	40	2	32+5	2	3	0
16	MF	(Italy) ITA	Mauro Camoranesi	35	4	27+6	4	0+2	0
6	MF	(Italy) ITA	Cristiano Zanetti	28	2	24+1	2	2+1	0
19	MF	(Italy) ITA	Matteo Paro	30	1	22+6	1	2	0
11	MF	(Czech Republic) CZE	Pavel Nedvěd	36	12	33	11	3	1
17	FW	(France) FRA	David Trezeguet	31	15	27+3	15	1	0
10	FW	(Italy) ITA	Alessandro Del Piero	37	23	32+3	20	0+2	3
12	GK	(Italy) ITA	Antonio Mirante	7	-8	5+2	-8	0	0
27	DF	(France) FRA	Jonathan Zebina	24	0	21+3	0	0	0
8	MF	(Italy) ITA	Giuliano Giannichedda	23	0	19+1	0	3	0
15	MF	(Italy) ITA	Claudio Marchisio	26	0	16+9	0	0+1	0
4	DF	(Croatia) CRO	Robert Kovač	19	0	15+2	0	2	0
20	FW	(Italy) ITA	Raffaele Palladino	25	8	14+11	8	0	0
32	MF	(Italy) ITA	Marco Marchionni	28	2	13+12	1	3	1
25	FW	(Uruguay) URU	Marcelo Zalayeta	18	4	13+4	4	1	0
30	DF	(Italy) ITA	Nicola Legrottaglie	12	0	7+3	0	2	0
9	FW	(Bulgaria) BUL	Valeri Bojinov	21	7	6+12	5	3	2
13	DF	(Italy) ITA	Felice Piccolo	7	0	5+2	0	0	0
40	MF	(Italy) ITA	Dario Venitucci	5	0	3+2	0	0	0
29	MF	(Italy) ITA	Paolo De Ceglie	8	1	1+7	1	0	0
43	MF	(Italy) ITA	Sebastian Giovinco	3	0	1+2	0	0	0
22	GK	(Italy) ITA	Emanuele Belardi	0	0	0	0	0	0
42	MF	(Italy) ITA	Raffaele Bianco	4	1	0+4	1	0	0
44	FW	(Italy) ITA	Davide Lanzafame	1	0	0+1	0	0	0
Players sold or loaned out during the January transfer window:
23	FW	(Paraguay) PAR	Tomás Guzmán	3	0	0+1	0	0+2	0

=== Goalscorers ===
Last updated 10 June 2007

No.	Pos.	Player	Serie B	Coppa Italia	Total
10	FW	(Italy) Alessandro Del Piero	20	3	23
17	FW	(France) David Trezeguet	15	0	15
11	MF	(Czech Republic) Pavel Nedvěd	11	1	12
20	FW	(Italy) Raffaele Palladino	8	0	8
9	FW	(Bulgaria) Valeri Bojinov	5	2	7
25	FW	(Uruguay) Marcelo Zalayeta	4	0	4
16	MF	(Italy) Mauro Camoranesi	4	0	4
3	DF	(Italy) Giorgio Chiellini	3	1	4
6	MF	(Italy) Cristiano Zanetti	2	0	2
14	DF	(Italy) Federico Balzaretti	2	0	2
18	DF	(France) Jean-Alain Boumsong	2	0	2
32	MF	(Italy) Marco Marchionni	1	1	2
19	MF	(Italy) Matteo Paro	1	0	1
29	MF	(Italy) Paolo De Ceglie	1	0	1
2	DF	(Italy) Alessandro Birindelli	1	0	1
42	MF	(Italy) Raffaele Bianco	1	0	1
Own goals			2	0	2
TOTALS			83	8	91

== Competitions ==
=== Serie B ===
==== League table ====
Pos	Team	Pld	W	D	L	GF	GA	GD	Pts	Promotion or relegation
1	Juventus (Note: Juventus started the season with a penalization of 30 points, which was later reduced to 9 on appeal) (C, P)	42	28	10	4	83	30	+53	85	Promotion to Serie A
2	Napoli (P)	42	21	16	5	52	29	+23	79	Promotion to Serie A
3	Genoa (Note: Third-placed team Genoa were directly promoted without a play-off being played as they finished 10 points ahead of fourth-placed Piacenza) (P)	42	23	9	10	68	44	+24	78	Promotion to Serie A
4	Piacenza	42	20	8	14	57	50	+7	68	
5	Rimini	42	17	16	9	55	38	+17	67 (Note: RIM 2–0 BRE; BRE 0–2 RIM)	

Source: Almanacco Illustrato del Calcio 2008 (in Italian). Panini Edizioni. November 2007.
Rules for classification: 1) points; 2) head-to-head points; 3) head-to-head goal difference; 4) head-to-head goals scored; 5) goal difference; 6) number of goals scored
(C) Champions; (P) Promoted

==== Results by matchday ====
Note: this table does not take point deductions, such as Juventus' 9-point one, into account.

Matchday	1	2	3	4	5	6	7	8	9	10	11	12	13	14	15	16	17	18	19	20	21	22	23	24	25	26	27	28	29	30	31	32	33	34	35	36	37	38	39	40	41	42
Ground	A	H	A	H	A	A	A	H	H	A	H	A	H	A	H	A	H	A	H	H	A	A	H	A	H	A	H	H	A	H	H	A	H	H	A	A	A	H	A	H	A	H
Result	D	W	W	W	W	W	W	W	W	D	W	D	W	D	W	W	D	L	W	W	D	D	W	W	W	L	W	W	W	D	W	W	D	W	W	W	D	W	W	W	L	L
Position	10	6	1	1	1	1	1	1	1	1	1	1	1	1	1	1	1	1	1	1	1	1	1	1	1	1	1	1	1	1	1	1	1	1	1	1	1	1	1	1	1	1

A = Away; H = Home; W = Win; D = Draw; L = Loss

==== Matches ====
9 September 2006 1	Rimini	1–1	Juventus	Romeo Neri, Rimini
16:00 CEST	Cristiano (yellow card) -' (yellow-red card) 69'; Ricchiuti 74'	Report	60' Paro	Referee: Massimiliano Saccani

16 September 2006 2	Juventus	2–1	Vicenza	Olimpico, Turin
16:00 CEST	Trezeguet 45'; Del Piero 53'	Report	59' Raimondi	Referee: Luca Marelli

19 September 2006 3	Crotone	0–3	Juventus	Ezio Scida, Crotone
20:30 CEST		Report	30', 76' Bojinov; 36' Boumsong	Referee: Andrea De Marco

23 September 2006 4	Juventus	4–0	Modena	Olimpico, Turin
16:00 CEST	Trezeguet 38', 70'; Del Piero 42'; Nedvěd 73'	Report		Referee: Tiziano Pieri

30 September 2006 5	Piacenza	0–2	Juventus	Leonardo Garilli, Piacenza
16:00 CEST		Report	30', 44' Trezeguet	Referee: Paolo Bertini

16 October 2006 7	Treviso	0–1	Juventus	Omobono Tenni, Treviso
20:45 CEST		Report	31' Zanetti	Referee: Stefano Farina

21 October 2006 8	Triestina	0–1	Juventus	Nereo Rocco, Trieste
16:00 CEST	Marchini (red card) 85'	Report	33' Zanetti; (yellow card) -' (yellow-red card) 70' Chiellini	Referee: Mauro Bergonzi

28 October 2006 9	Juventus	1–0	Frosinone	Olimpico, Turin
16:00 CEST	Del Piero 73'	Report		Referee: Francesco Squillace

1 November 2006 6	Juventus	2–0	Brescia	Olimpico, Turin
17:30 CET	Del Piero 7'; Colombo 22' (o.g.)	Report	(red card) 88' Zambelli	Referee: Paolo Tagliavento
Note: Postponed due to the concomitant with national team matches; originally scheduled for 8 October 2006.

6 November 2006 10	Napoli	1–1	Juventus	San Paolo, Naples
21:00 CET	Bogliacino 73'	Report	67' Del Piero	Referee: Nicola Rizzoli

11 November 2006 11	Juventus	2–0	Pescara	Olimpico, Turin
16:00 CET	Nedvěd 18', 57'	Report		Referee: Maurizio Ciampi

18 November 2006 12	AlbinoLeffe	1–1	Juventus	Atleti Azzurri d'Italia, Bergamo
16:00 CET	Joelson 25' (pen.)	Report	(red card) 24' Buffon; 52' Palladino	Referee: Christian Brighi

25 November 2006 13	Juventus	4–1	Lecce	Olimpico, Turin
16:00 CET	Bojinov 64', 75'; Palladino 90+1'; De Ceglie 90+4'	Report	62' Osvaldo; (yellow card) -' (yellow-red card) 69' Diamoutene	Referee: Andrea Gervasoni

1 December 2006 14	Genoa	1–1	Juventus	Luigi Ferraris, Genoa
20:45 CET	Jurić 74'	Report	71' (yellow card) -' (red card) 90+3' Nedvěd	Referee: Stefano Farina

9 December 2006 15	Juventus	1–0	Hellas Verona	Olimpico, Turin
16:00 CET	Camoranesi 55'	Report		Referee: Nicola Pierpaoli

19 December 2006 17	Bologna	0–1	Juventus	Renato Dall'Ara, Bologna
20:30 CET		Report	73' Zalayeta	Referee: Domenico Messina

22 December 2006 18	Juventus	2–2	Arezzo	Olimpico, Turin
20:30 CET	Trezeguet 58'; Palladino 65'	Report	80' (pen.), 84' Martinetti; (red card) 90' Terra	Referee: Domenico Celi

13 January 2007 19	Mantova	1–0	Juventus	Danilo Martelli, Mantua
16:00 CET	Kovač 53' (o.g.)	Report		Referee: Antonio Giannoccaro

16 January 2007 16	Juventus	2–1	Cesena	Olimpico, Turin
20:45 CET	Del Piero 17'; Trezeguet 25'; Zebina (red card) 67'	Report	62' Papa Waigo	Referee: Luca Banti
Note: Postponed due to the death of two Berretti squad's players (Riccardo Neri and Alessio Ferramosca) in Vinovo Sport Center; originally scheduled for 15 December 2006.

20 January 2007 20	Juventus	4–2	Bari	Olimpico, Turin
16:00 CET	Trezeguet 35'; Nedvěd 46', 73'; Del Piero 68'	Report	1' Santoruvo; 89' Gervasoni	Referee: Andrea De Marco

27 January 2007 21	Spezia	1–1	Juventus	Alberto Picco, La Spezia
16:00 CET	Confalone 39'	Report	(yellow card) -' (yellow-red card) 79' Giannichedda; 90+2' Nedvěd	Referee: Gianluca Rocchi

10 February 2007 23	Vicenza	2–2	Juventus	Romeo Menti, Vicenza
15:00 CET	73' Nastos; 78' Paonessa	Report	Palladino 6'; Del Piero 60'	Referee: Paolo Tagliavento

17 February 2007 24	Juventus	5–0	Crotone	Olimpico, Turin
15:00 CET	Nedvěd 17'; Balzaretti 23'; Del Piero 44', 65', 79'	Report		Referee: Antonio Damato

26 February 2007 25	Modena	0–1	Juventus	Alberto Braglia, Modena
20:45 CET		Report	86' (o.g.) Centurioni	Referee: Luca Marelli

4 March 2007 26	Juventus	4–0	Piacenza	Olimpico, Turin
20:30 CET	Trezeguet 1'; Del Piero 50' (pen.), 68', 90+2'	Report	(yellow card) -' (yellow-red card) 74' Campagnaro	Referee: Paolo Bertini

10 March 2007 27	Brescia	3–1	Juventus	Danilo Martelli, Mantua
15:00 CET	Serafini 4', 26', 46'	Report	9'Del Piero	Referee: Andrea De Marco

13 March 2007 28	Juventus	1–0	Treviso	Olimpico, Turin
15:00 CET	Palladino 71'	Report		Referee: Mauro Bergonzi

19 March 2007 29	Juventus	5–1	Triestina	Olimpico, Turin
21:00 CET	Camoranesi 8'; Palladino 27', 47', 60'; Bojinov 81'	Report	7' Piovaccari	Referee: Paolo Mazzoleni

31 March 2007 32	Pescara	0–1	Juventus	Adriatico, Pescara
16:00 CEST		Report	74' Birindelli	Referee: Oscar Girardi

6 April 2007 33	Juventus	1–1	AlbinoLeffe	Olimpico, Turin
16:00 CEST	Balzaretti 38'	Report	32' Ruopolo	Referee: Antonio Damato

10 April 2007 31	Juventus	2–0	Napoli	Olimpico, Turin
17:30 CEST	Camoranesi 18'; Del Piero 50'; Marchisio (red card) 62'	Report		Referee: Nicola Ayroldi

14 April 2007 34	Lecce	1–3	Juventus	Via del Mare, Lecce
16:00 CEST	Polenghi 15'	Report	11' Marchionni; 47' Zalayeta; 64' Camoranesi	Referee: Oberdan Pantana

17 April 2007 22	Juventus	0–0	Rimini	Olimpico, Turin
20:30 CEST	Balzaretti (red card) 46'	Report		Referee: Maurizio Ciampi
Note: Postponed due to Catania football violence; originally scheduled for 3 February 2007.

21 April 2007 35	Juventus	3–1	Genoa	Olimpico, Turin
16:00 CEST	Nedvěd 19'; Chiellini 38'; Trezeguet 66'	Report	46' Di Vaio	Referee: Emidio Morganti

27 April 2007 36	Hellas Verona	0–1	Juventus	Marc'Antonio Bentegodi, Verona
19:00 CEST		Report	43' Boumsong	Referee: Matteo Trefoloni

1 May 2007 30	Frosinone	0–2	Juventus	Matusa, Frosinone
15:00 CEST		Report	Zalayeta 59', 90+3'	Referee: Massimiliano Saccani

6 May 2007 37	Cesena	2–2	Juventus	Dino Manuzzi, Cesena
20:30 CEST	Salvetti 11'; Waigo 55'	Report	40' Trezeguet; 42' Nedvěd	Referee: Nicola Stefanini

12 May 2007 38	Juventus	3–1	Bologna	Olimpico, Turin
16:00 CEST	Del Piero 37', 86' (pen.); Trezeguet 90+2'	Report	27' Bellucci	Referee: Nicola Ayroldi

19 May 2007 39	Arezzo	1–5	Juventus	Comunale, Arezzo
16:00 CEST	Floro Flores 45'	Report	19', 76' Del Piero; 34', 49' Chiellini; 87' Trezeguet	Referee: Nicola Rizzoli

26 May 2007 40	Juventus	2–0	Mantova	Olimpico, Turin
16:00 CEST	Trezeguet 55'; Nedvěd 73'	Report		Referee: Andrea Romeo

3 June 2007 41	Bari	1–0	Juventus	San Nicola, Bari
	Carrus 57'	Report	(red card) 86' Legrottaglie	Referee: Andrea De Marco

10 June 2007 42	Juventus	2–3	Spezia	Olimpico, Turin
	Trezeguet 27'; Bianco 69'	Report	26' Pecorari; 66' Guidetti; 90' Padoin	Referee: Christian Brighi

=== Coppa Italia ===
19 August 2006 First round	Martina	0–3	Juventus	Bari
20:30 CEST (UTC+02:00)		Report	Marchionni 7'; Bojinov 35'; Nedvěd 82'	Stadium: Stadio San Nicola; Referee: Nicola Rizzoli

23 August 2006 Second round	Cesena	1–2	Juventus	Cesena
20:45 CEST (UTC+02:00)	Balzaretti 23' (o.g.)	Report	Bojinov 45'; Del Piero 74'	Stadium: Stadio Dino Manuzzi; Referee: Paolo Bertini

27 August 2006 Third round	Napoli	3–3 (a.e.t.) (5–4 p)	Juventus	Naples
21:00 CEST (UTC+02:00)	Bucchi 38'; Calaiò 53'; Cannavaro 107'; Grava (yellow card) -' (yellow-red card) 114'	Report	Chiellini 27'; Del Piero 78', 105'; Camoranesi (yellow card) -' (red card) 107'	Stadium: Stadio San Paolo; Referee: Matteo Trefoloni
	Penalties
	Trotta (penalty scored); Bucchi (penalty scored); Domizzi (penalty scored); Dalla Bona (penalty missed); P. Cannavaro (penalty missed); Montervino (penalty scored); Amodio (penalty scored)		(penalty missed) Buffon; (penalty scored) Guzmán; (penalty scored) Birindelli; (penalty missed) Marchionni; (penalty scored) Del Piero; (penalty scored) Chiellini; (penalty missed) Balzaretti
