= Tommaso Silvestri =

Italian footballer

Personal information
- Date of birth: 26 October 1991 (age 35)
- Place of birth: Dolo, Italy
- Height: 1.85 m (6 ft 1 in)
- Position: Defender

Team information
- Current team: Pergolettese
- Number: 5

Youth career
- Juventus

Senior career*
Years	Team	Apps	(Gls)
2010–2011	Juventus	0	(0)
2010–2011	→ Viareggio (loan)	4	(0)
2011–2013	Casale	39	(2)
2013–2017	SPAL	73	(3)
2017–2018	Trapani	28	(6)
2018–2021	Catania	92	(3)
2021–2023	Modena	52	(2)
2023–2025	Catania	12	(0)
2025	→ Triestina (loan)	12	(1)
2025–2026	Triestina	22	(1)
2026–	Pergolettese	0	(0)
- * Club domestic league appearances and goals as of 30 April 2026

Tommaso Silvestri (born 26 October 1991) is an Italian professional footballer who plays as a defender for Serie C Group A club Pergolettese.

== Career ==
Born in Dolo, in the Province of Venice, Veneto, Silvestri was a player of Juventus youth team. On 31 August 2010 Silvestri was signed by Viareggio in temporary deal. The Tuscan team also signed Luca Castiglia, Nicola Cosentini, Alessandro D'Antoni, Giorgio Merlano and Carlo Pinsoglio from the Turin based club.

In July 2011 Silvestri was signed by Casale in co-ownership deal. In June 2012 Juventus gave up the remain 50% registration rights of Silvestri to Casale. The Piedmontese club relegated from Lega Pro Seconda Divisione in 2013. In the same year he joined SPAL. The club qualified to 2014–15 Serie C as the 6th of Group A of 2013–14 Lega Pro Seconda Divisione.

On 10 July 2018, he signed a three-year contract with Catania.

On 21 July 2021, Silvestri signed a three-year contract with Modena.
