= List of Italian football transfers winter 2012–13 =

This is a list of Italian football transfers for the 2012–13 season. Only moves from Serie A and Serie B are listed.

The Italian winter transfer window opened for four weeks starting from 3 January 2013 (Thursday). Players without a club could join one either during or in between transfer windows. International transfers outward depended on the status of transfer windows of the country the player arrived in.

Clubs could still use their two non-EU international signing quota in winter windows if they did not use the quota in the summer, subject to the club having either released (on 1 July 2012), sold abroad, or nominated players which had obtained an EU passport recently. These transfers are marked yellow.

== January 2013 ==
Date	Name	Moving from	Moving to	Fee
28 November 2012^{1}	Emiliano Bonazzoli	Reggina	Padova	Undisclosed
28 December 2012	Nicolás Bertolo (Argentina)	Palermo	(Mexico) Cruz Azul	Undisclosed
29 December 2012^{1}	Salvatore Aronica	Napoli	Palermo	Undisclosed
1 January 2013	Tommaso Rocchi	Lazio	Internazionale	Undisclosed
2 January 2013	Gaetano Caridi	Pro Vercelli	Cremonese	Undisclosed
3 January 2013	Loris Bacchetti	Pescara (at Lanciano, t)	Catanzaro	Loan
3 January 2013	Alexandre Pato (Brazil)	Milan	(Brazil) Corinthians	€15M
3 January 2013	Matuzalém (Brazil)	Lazio	Genoa	Loan
3 January 2013	Eros Pisano	Palermo	Genoa	Co-ownership, €0.7M (swap with Anselmo)
3 January 2013	Anselmo (Brazil)	Genoa	Palermo	Co-ownership, €0.7M (swap with Anselmo)
3 January 2013	Andrea Pisanu	Bologna	(Canada) Montreal Impact	Loan, 1-year
3 January 2013	Federico Peluso	Atalanta	Juventus	Loan
3 January 2013	Marco Perrotta	Pescara (youth)	Paganese	Loan
3 January 2013	Gianluca Nicco	Pescara	Perugia	Loan
3 January 2013	Francesco Cangi	Verona	Perugia	Loan
3 January 2013	Filippo Carini	Modena	Pisa	Loan
4 January 2013	Pablo Granoche (Uruguay) (Italy)	Chievo (at Padova, t)	Cesena	Co-ownership, €500
4 January 2013	Manuel Iori	Chievo (at Cesena, t)	Padova	Co-ownership, €140,000
4 January 2013	Marco Migliorini	Torino	Como	Co-ownership, undisclosed (swap with Maugeri)
4 January 2013	Nicolás Gorobsov (Argentina) (Italy)	Torino	Nocerina	Loan
4 January 2013	Giuseppe De Feudis	Torino	Padova	Undisclosed
5 January 2013	Filadelfio Carroccio	Reggina	Gubbio	Loan
5 January 2013	Antonio Floro Flores	Udinese (at (Spain) Granada, t)	Genoa	Undisclosed
5 January 2013	Alexander Merkel	Genoa	Udinese	Co-ownership, undisclosed
5 January 2013	Masahudu Alhassan (Ghana)	Genoa (at Novara, t)	Udinese (remains at Novara, t)	Co-ownership, undisclosed
7 January 2013	Antonio Piccolo	Livorno	Lanciano	Loan
7 January 2013	Matteo Abbate	Verona	Pro Vercelli	Loan
8 January 2013	Sergio Viotti	Chievo	Cremonese	Loan
8 January 2013	Gianluca Lapadula	Cesena (& Parma, c)	Frosinone	Loan
8 January 2013	Alessandro Sgrigna	Torino	Verona	Undisclosed
8 January 2013	Alessandro Agostini	Torino	Verona	Loan
9 January 2013	Michele Canini	Genoa	Atalanta	Co-ownership, undisclosed
9 January 2013	Thomas Manfredini	Atalanta	Genoa	Undisclosed
9 January 2013	Daniele Forte	Cesena	Borgo	Loan
9 January 2013	Andrea Campagnolo	Siena	Cesena	Undisclosed
9 January 2013	Massimo Bonanni	Genoa (at Grosseto, t)	(Switzerland) Lugano	Loan
9 January 2013	Pablo Armero (Colombia)	Udinese	Napoli	Loan
10 January 2013	Junior Tallo (Ivory Coast)	Roma	Bari	Loan
10 January 2013	Marco Caldore	Genoa	Aversa	Loan
10 January 2013	Ivan Castiglia	Reggina	Catanzaro	Loan
10 January 2013	Ronaldo Pompeu (Brazil)	Empoli	Catanzaro	Loan
10 January 2013	Marco Martina Rini	Brescia	Cremonese	Loan
10 January 2013	Simone Di Dio	Juventus (at Aosta Valley, t)	Martina	Co-ownership
10 January 2013	Andrea Dossena	Napoli	Palermo	Loan
10 January 2013	Matteo Cincilla	Inter (youth)	Parma	Undisclosed
10 January 2013	Daniele Pedrelli	Spezia	Pisa	Loan
10 January 2013	Nicola Del Pivo	Parma (& Cesena, at Como, t)	Santarcangelo	Loan
11 January 2013	Fabio Ceravolo	Reggina	Ternana	Undisclosed
11 January 2013	David Di Michele	Chievo	Reggina	Free
12 January 2013	Mattia Desole	Milan (at Monza, t)	Foligno	Loan
12 January 2013	Emanuele Calaiò	Siena	Napoli	Loan
12 January 2013	Francesco Della Rocca	Fiorentina	Siena	Loan
13 January 2013	Martino Borghese (Switzerland)	Bari	Pro Vercelli	Loan
13 January 2013	Francesco Grandolfo	Bari	Tritium	Loan
14 January 2013	Andrea Romanò	Inter	Prato	Loan
14 January 2013	Sacha Cori	Cesena (at Empoli, t)	Entella	Loan
14 January 2013	Elia Ballardini	Cesena	Entella	Undisclosed
15 January 2013	Simone Calvano	Milan (at Verona, t)	Verona	Co-ownership, €10,000
15 January 2013	Simone Calvano	Verona (& Milan, c)	San Marino	Loan
15 January 2013	Alessandro Marotta	Bari (at Cremonese, t)	Benevento	Loan
16 January 2013	Angelo Antonazzo	Grosseto	Reggina	Free
16 January 2013	Enrico Tonozzi	Novara	Treviso	Loan
16 January 2013	Milan Milanović (Serbia)	Palermo	Vicenza	Loan
17 January 2013	Attila Filkor	Milan (at Bari, t)	Pro Vercelli	Loan
17 January 2013	Luca Caldirola	Cesena (& Inter, c)	Brescia	Loan
17 January 2013	Mattia Spezzani	Modena	Verona	Undisclosed
17 January 2013	Mattia Spezzani	Verona	Mantova	Loan
18 January 2013	Rubén Olivera (Uruguay)	Fiorentina	Genoa	Loan
18 January 2013	Fabrizio Melara	Reggina	Carpi	Loan
18 January 2013	Federico Rodríguez (Uruguay) (European Union)	Bologna (& Genoa, c)	Montevideo Wanderers (Uruguay)	Loan
20 January 2013	Wesley Sneijder	Internazionale	(Turkey) Galatasaray	€7.5M
21 January 2013	Massimo Volta	Sampdoria (at (Spain) Levante, t)	Cesena	Loan
22 January 2013	Adriano Montalto	Latina	Ascoli	Loan
22 January 2013	Andrea Giallombardo	Ascoli	Latina	Loan
22 January 2013	Lorenzo Del Prete	Novara	Crotone	Loan
22 January 2013	Giuseppe Rizzo	Reggina	Pescara	Loan
22 January 2013	Giuseppe Colucci	Pescara	Reggina	Undisclosed
22 January 2013	Simone Romagnoli	Pescara (& Milan)	Spezia	Loan
23 January 2013	Gianmarco Zigoni	Milan (at Pro Vercelli, t)	Avellino	Loan
23 January 2013	Simone Dallamano	Brescia	Cesena	Free
23 January 2013	Mohamed Traoré (Guinea)	Crotone	Parma	Co-ownership, resolution, €500
23 January 2013	Nicolas Giani	Vicenza	Perugia	Loan
23 January 2013	Matteo Bianchetti	Internazionale	Verona	Loan
24 January 2013	Manuel Coppola	Siena (& Parma, c)	Cesena	Loan
24 January 2013	Federico Piovaccari	Sampdoria (at Novara, t)	Grosseto	Loan
24 January 2013	Afriyie Acquah (Ghana)	Palermo (at Parma, t)	TSG Hoffenheim (Germany)	Undisclosed
24 January 2013	Mattia Valoti	Milan	AlbinoLeffe	Loan
25 January 2013	Mattia Minesso	Vicenza	Cittadella	Loan
25 January 2013	Tommaso Bellazzini	Cittadella	Vicenza	Loan
25 January 2013	Tommaso Cancellotti	Pro Vercelli (& Sampdoria, t)	Gubbio	Loan
25 January 2013	Bruno Martella	Sampdoria	Viareggio	Loan
25 January 2013	Alessio Viola	Reggina	Carpi	Loan
25 January 2013	Cristian Zaccardo	Parma	Milan	Undisclosed
25 January 2013	Djamel Mesbah (Algeria) (European Union)	Milan	Parma	Undisclosed
25 January 2013	Rodney Strasser (Sierra Leone)	Milan	Parma	Loan
25 January 2013	Renan Wagner (Brazil) (European Union)	Varese (at Entella, t)	Normanna	Loan
25 January 2013	Paolo Dellafiore	Siena (& Parma, c)	Padova	Loan
26 January 2013	Francesco Acerbi	Milan	Genoa	Co-ownership resolution, €4M
26 January 2013	Kévin Constant	Genoa	Milan	Co-ownership, €4M
28 January 2013	Andrea Rossi	Parma (& Siena, c; at Cesena, t)	Bari	Loan
28 January 2013	Matteo Di Piazza	Pro Vercelli	Gubbio	Loan
29 January 2013	Davide Lanzafame	Catania (at Grosseto, t)	(Hungary) Budapest Honvéd	Loan
29 January 2013	Mario Sampirisi	Genoa	Chievo	Loan
29 January 2013	Gianluca Sansone	Torino (& Sassuolo, c)	Sampdoria (& Sassuolo, c)	€1.45M (transfer of co-ownership)
29 January 2013	Paolo Grossi	Siena	Verona	Co-ownership, €275,000 (swap with Guzzo)
30 January 2013	Ivan Reali	Ascoli	Aosta Valley	Loan
30 January 2013	Lorenzo Crisetig	Parma (& Inter, c, at Spezia, t)	Crotone	Loan
30 January 2013	Yuri Papi	Spezia (at Borgo-a-Buggiano, t)	Gavorrano	Loan
30 January 2013	Mattia Cassani	Fiorentina	Genoa	Loan
30 January 2013	Alberto Gallinetta	Parma (at FeralpiSalò, t)	Juventus (remains at FeralpiSalò, t)	Co-ownership, €1M
30 January 2013	Filippo Boniperti	Juventus (at Empoli, t)	Parma	Co-ownership, €1M
30 January 2013	Marcel Büchel	Siena (at Cremonese, t)	Juventus (remains at Cremonese, t)	Co-ownership, €1.5M
30 January 2013	Andrea Schiavone	Juventus	Siena (remains at Juventus, t)	Co-ownership, €1.5M
30 January 2013	Philippe Coutinho (Brazil)	Internazionale	(England) Liverpool	Undisclosed
30 January 2013	Mauro Boselli	(England) Wigan	Palermo	Loan
30 January 2013	Paolo Grossi	Verona (& Siena, c)	Pro Vercelli	Loan
31 January 2013	Ivan Fatić (Montenegro)	Chievo	Lecce	Loan
31 January 2013	Ousmane Dramé (France)	Padova	Lecce	Loan
31 January 2013	Moreno Beretta	Sampdoria	Entella	Loan
31 January 2013	Oscar Branzani	Cittadella (& Sampdoria, c)	Andria	Loan
31 January 2013	Emanuele Testardi	Sampdoria	South Tyrol	Loan
31 January 2013	Gianluca Turchetta	Cesena	South Tyrol	Loan
31 January 2013	Vincenzo Camilleri	Reggina (at Cagliari, t)	Barletta	Loan
31 January 2013	Manuel Giandonato	Juventus (at Vicenza, t)	Cesena	Loan
31 January 2013	Francesco Acerbi	Genoa	Chievo	Loan
31 January 2013	Alberto Paloschi	Milan	Chievo	Co-ownership, €3.5 million
31 January 2013	Simone Pecorini	Internzionale (at Empoli)	Cittadella	Loan
31 January 2013	Alex Pinardi	Vicenza	Cremonese	Loan
31 January 2013	Matteo Momentè	Varese	Cremonese	Loan
31 January 2013	Gabriele Paonessa	Parma (at Perugia, t)	Crotone	Loan
31 January 2013	Reto Ziegler	Juventus (at (Russia) Lokomotiv Moscow, t)	(Turkey) Fenerbahçe	Loan, €250,000
31 January 2013	Yuri Papi	Spezia (at Borgo-a-Buggiano, t)	Gavorrano	Loan
31 January 2013	Paolo Ropolo	Aosta Valley	Gavorrano	Undisclosed (w. Torino, c)
31 January 2013	Francesco Cosenza	Pro Vercelli	Grosseto	Loan
31 January 2013	Danilo Soddimo	Pescara	Grosseto	Loan
31 January 2013	Emanuele Belardi	Cesena	Grosseto	Free
31 January 2013	Hasan Pepić (Montenegro) (European Union)	Dynamo Dresden (Germany)	Juventus	Undisclosed
31 January 2013	Michele Cavion	Vicenza (youth)	Juventus (at Carrarese, t)	€1M
31 January 2013	Nicolò Corticchia	Juventus (at Carrarese, t)	Vicenza	€600,000
31 January 2013	Salvatore D'Elia	Juventus (at Venezia, t)	Vicenza (remained at Venezia, t)	€400,000
31 January 2013	Luca Martinelli	Cittadella	Juve Stabia	Undisclosed
31 January 2013	Luca Pompilio	Varese (at Pavia, t)	Juve Stabia	Co-ownership, undisclosed
31 January 2013	Sergiu Suciu	Torino	Juve Stabia	Undisclosed
31 January 2013	Robert Acquafresca	Bologna (& Genoa, c)	Levante (Spain)	Loan
31 January 2013	Mario Balotelli	Manchester City (England)	Milan	Undisclosed
31 January 2013	Francesco Giusti	Lanciano	Milazzo	Undisclosed
31 January 2013	Pasquale Maiorino	Vicenza	Modena	Loan
31 January 2013	Maurizio Ciaramitaro	Modena	Vicenza	Loan
31 January 2013	Alfonso De Lucia	Livorno	Nocerina	Loan
31 January 2013	Gabriele Aldegani	Nocerina	Livorno	Loan
31 January 2013	Vincenzo Pepe	Lanciano	Nocerina	Loan
31 January 2013	Alessandro Iacobucci	Siena (at Spezia, t)	Parma (remains at Spezia, t)	Co-ownership resolution, €500
31 January 2013	Bryan Gioè	Livorno (youth)	Pavia	Loan
31 January 2013	Andrea Parodi	Genoa (at Santarcangelo, t)	Pavia	Loan
31 January 2013	Leonardo Massoni	Sassuolo	Perugia	Undisclosed
31 January 2013	Kadir Caidi	Bologna (& Cesena, c)	Pontedera	Loan
31 January 2013	Gaël Genevier	Siena (at Juve Stabia, t)	Pro Vercelli	Loan
31 January 2013	Giuseppe Greco	Modena	Pro Vercelli	Undisclosed
31 January 2013	Alessandro Vinci	Juve Stabia	Pro Vercelli	Loan
31 January 2013	Luca Antei	Roma	Sassuolo	Loan
31 January 2013	Alberto Brignoli	Lumezzane	Ternana	Co-ownership resolution, undisclosed
31 January 2013	Daniel Bessa (Brazil) (Italy)	Internazionale	Vicenza	Loan
31 January 2013	Nicolás Bremec (Uruguay) (European Union)	Grosseto	Vicenza	Loan
31 January 2013	Simone Tiribocchi	Pro Vercelli	Vicenza	Undisclosed
