= Alessandro D'Antoni =

Italian footballer (born 1988)

Personal information
- Date of birth: 3 August 1988 (age 38)
- Place of birth: Turin, Italy
- Height: 1.83 m (6 ft 0 in)
- Position: Forward

Team information
- Current team: Rivarolese

Youth career
- 2000–2008: Juventus

Senior career*
Years	Team	Apps	(Gls)
2008–2009	Juventus	0	(0)
2008–2009	→ Giulianova (loan)	31	(7)
2009–2010	Figline	26	(2)
2010–2011	Viareggio	14	(1)
2011–2012	San Marino	34	(12)
2012–2013	Borgo	31	(12)
2013–2014	Santarcangelo	28	(7)
2014	Mantova	0	(0)
2014–2015	Maceratese	28	(13)
2015–2016	Chieri	28	(15)
2016–2017	Cuneo	30	(15)
2017–2018	Pro Sesto	16	(4)
2018–2019	Bra	20	(2)
2019–2020	AC Vigasio	9	(5)
2020	Casale	4	(0)
2020–2021	Caratese	18	(7)
2021–2022	FCD Rivoli Calcio		
2022–2024	Pro Settimo		
2024–	Rivarolese		
- * Club domestic league appearances and goals as of 10:09, 8 October 2026 (UTC)

Alessandro D'Antoni (born 3 August 1988) is an Italian footballer who plays as a forward for Rivarolese.

== Career ==
=== Juventus and loans ===
D'Antoni started his career working his way through the Juventus FC youth ranks since 2000, before he made his way to the "Primavera" youth squad in 2006. He never managed a senior team debut with Juventus during 2006–07 Serie B nor 2007–08 Serie A, but after graduating the youth team on 1 July 2008, he was loaned to fourth division club Giulianova.

He was sold to the third division club Figline in co-ownership deal, along with teammates, Salvatore D'Elia, Marco Duravia, and Nicola Cosentini in July 2009. D'Antoni made 26 league appearances for the Lega Pro club in his first season, although the striker only managed 2 league goals. He returned to Juventus in June 2010.

On 8 July 2010 he joined another third division side F.C. Esperia Viareggio, in another co-ownership deal, along with teammates Cosentini, Giorgio Merlano, Tommaso Silvestri (loan), Carlo Pinsoglio (loan), and Luca Castiglia (loan). He played 14 times in the league (nil in relegation playoffs) and played 5 times in the Lega Pro cup.

In June 2011 Juventus gave up the remain 50% registration rights to Viareggio along with Cosentini and Merlano.

=== Serie C clubs ===
Despite Viareggio got the full registration rights of D'Antoni, he was transferred to Sammarinese club San Marino Calcio which was playing in Italian Lega Pro Seconda Divisione. He found his goalscoring shoes again with 12 league goals. In July 2012 he left for another fourth division club Borgo-a-Buggiano.
