= Stefano Di Berardino =

Italian professional footballer (born 1987)

Personal information
- Date of birth: 11 January 1987 (age 39)
- Place of birth: Avezzano, Italy
- Height: 1.87 m (6 ft 2 in)
- Position: Centre-back

Youth career
- ?–?: Aquilotti Avezzano
- ?–2005: Pescara
- 2006–2007: Juventus

Senior career*
Years	Team	Apps	(Gls)
2005–2006	Pescara		
2007–2008	Juve Stabia	21	(2)
2008–2009	Juventus	0	(0)
2008–2009	→ Pistoiese (loan)	28	(1)
2009–2010	Valle del Giovenco	6	(0)
2010	→ Pro Vasto (loan)	10	(0)
2010–2011	Sacilese	?	(?)
2011	Vibonese	26	(1)
2012-2013	Chiavari Caperana	11	(1)
2013	Olympia Agnonese	16	(0)
2013-2014	Sulmona	10	(2)
2014	Maceratese	12	(0)
2014-2015	Celano Marsica	3	(0)
2020	A.S.D. Pucetta		
Total		143	(7)
- * Club domestic league appearances and goals

Stefano Di Berardino (born 11 January 1987) is an Italian professional footballer who plays in the role of defender.

== Career ==
=== Early career ===
On 30 August 2006, Di Berardino was transferred to Serie A giants Juventus FC, where he was sent to the youth system. In exchange, Andrea Luci went to Pescara on loan. He was awarded no. 2 shirt in the second half 2005–06 season, to fill for the vacancy of Nicola Diliso.

=== Lega Pro ===
In 2007, Di Berardino graduated from the Juventus youth system, and was soon sold to S.S. Juve Stabia in a co-ownership deal, along with Giuseppe Rizza and Matteo Trini. He made 21 appearances and scored one goal for the club during the 2007–08 Serie C1 season. In June 2008, Juventus bought back Di Berardino for €8,000. For the 2008–09 season, he was once again sent on loan to the Italian Lega Pro Prima Divisione (ex-Serie C1); this time he joined A.C. Pistoiese, where the defender was consistently part of the starting line-up, making, in total, 28 appearances with 1 goal. He returned to Juventus again in the summer of 2009, but was sold to A.S. Pescina Valle del Giovenco in a co-ownership deal. He made just 6 appearances in 5 months, and was loaned to Lega Pro Seconda Divisione club F.C. Pro Vasto, where he has since made 10 league appearances.

In June 2010, Juventus did not extended the co-ownership deal and gave up rest of the player's rights to Valle del Giovenco; however, the club soon went bankrupt, and Di Berardino moved to another Seconda Divisione club, Sacilese. In 2011 he played in the same tournament to Vibo Valentia.

=== Serie D ===
Since 2012 he has played in interregional tournaments with the teams of Chiavari, Agnone, Sulmona, Macerata and Celano; in regional tournaments in Avezzano with A.S.D. Pucetta.
