= Pecorari =

Pecorari is an Italian surname. Notable people with the surname include:

- Adam Pecorari (born 1984), American racing driver
- Antonio Carlos Pecorari (born 1962), commonly known as Tatu, Brazilian football coach and former player
- Anselmo Guido Pecorari (born 1946), Italian Roman Catholic archbishop and diplomat
- Marco Pecorari (born 1977), Italian footballer
- Robbie Pecorari (born 1987), American racing driver
