= Bottone =

Bottone is a surname. Notable people with the surname include:

- Bonaventura Bottone (born 1950), English-born operatic tenor
- Davide Bottone (born 1986), Italian footballer
- Donato Bottone (born 1988), Italian footballer
