= Pozzato =

Pozzato is an Italian surname. Notable people with the surname include:

- Andrea Pozzato (born 1988), Italian footballer
- Filippo Pozzato (born 1981), Italian cyclist

== See also ==
- Pozzallo, a town and comune in the province of Ragusa, Sicily
