= Giuseppe Sculli =

Italian footballer

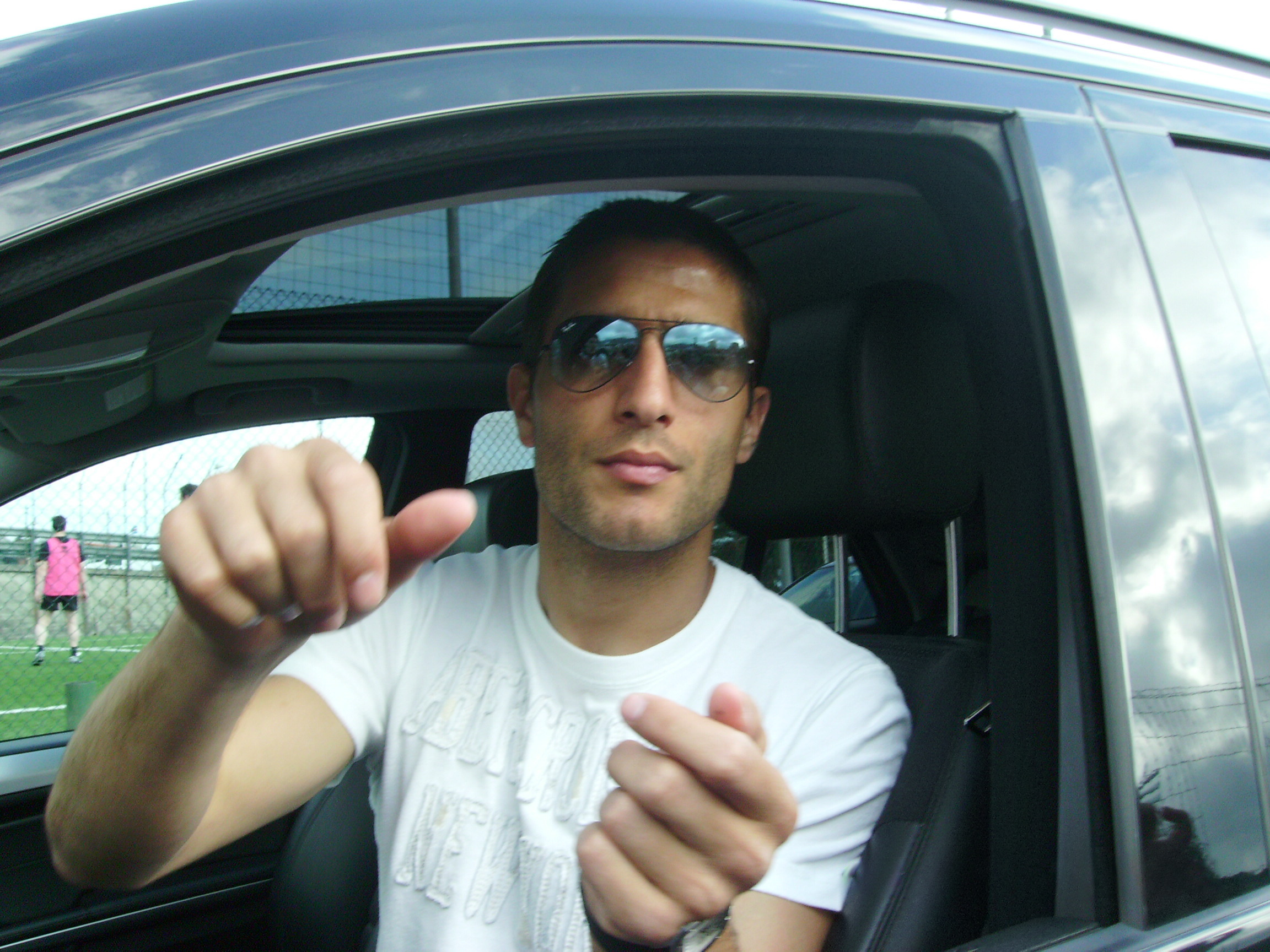

Personal information
- Date of birth: 23 March 1981 (age 45)
- Place of birth: Locri, Italy
- Height: 1.79 m (5 ft 10 in)
- Position: Forward

Team information
- Current team: Accademia Pavese
- Number: 10

Senior career*
Years	Team	Apps	(Gls)
1999–2003	Juventus	0	(0)
2000–2002	→ Crotone (loan)	51	(8)
2002–2003	→ Modena (loan)	31	(8)
2003–2005	Chievo	18	(2)
2004–2005	→ Brescia (loan)	28	(0)
2005–2007	Juventus	0	(0)
2005–2006	→ Messina (loan)	34	(2)
2006–2007	→ Genoa (loan)	11	(4)
2007–2011	Genoa	114	(18)
2011–2015	Lazio	24	(4)
2012	→ Genoa (loan)	17	(3)
2013	→ Pescara (loan)	10	(0)
2014	→ Genoa (loan)	10	(0)
2016–2019	Accademia Pavese	0	(0)

International career^{‡}
1997	Italy U-15	9	(0)
1997–1998	Italy U-16	7	(1)
1999–2000	Italy U-18	8	(6)
2001	Italy U-20	8	(2)
2002–2004	Italy U-21	25	(9)
Medal record
Representing Italy
Men's Football
Bronze medal – third place	2004 Athens	Team competition
- * Club domestic league appearances and goals as of 16 May 2010 ‡ National team caps and goals as of August 2006

Giuseppe Sculli (born 23 March 1981) is a retired Italian footballer who played in several positions; primarily a striker, he could play anywhere along the front-line, and also played as a winger, as a second striker, and even as a right-sided midfielder or as a wingback on the right flank.

== Club career ==
=== Juventus ===
Sculli joined Juventus FC in 1999, although he failed to make a single appearance for the club throughout the 1999–2000 season.

=== Crotone ===
F.C. Crotone took Sculli on a two-year loan spell in the summer of 2000, paying Juventus €500k for the loan. In his first season at Crotone, Sculli played 23 matches and scored 3 goals, making his debut against A.C. ChievoVerona. The next season, he became even more prevalent in the first team, making 27 appearances and scoring 5 goals.

=== Modena ===
Giuseppe Sculli returned to Juventus after the end of the 2001–02 Serie B season but was again sent on loan, this time to Serie A side Modena F.C. Sculli made his Serie A debut on 14 September 2002 against A.C. Milan. He went on to score 8 goals that season in 31 appearances.

=== Chievo ===
Sculli was purchased by Chievo in mid-2003 in a co-ownership deal for a lump sum of €450K along with Paro and Gastaldello as part of the deal of Nicola Legrottaglie transfer. Sculli endured a difficult campaign at Chievo in the 2003–04 season, struggling for playing time and form, scoring 3 goals in 20 appearances.

=== Brescia ===
He was sent on loan to Serie A side Brescia Calcio in an attempt to aid the player in regaining his form. Sculli played much more this season, making 28 appearances, but for the first time in his senior professional career, failed to score a single goal that season.

=== Juventus ===
Juventus brought back Sculli, Paro and Gastaldello from Chievo in 2005 for a lump sum of €1.05M. Sculli signed a contract until the summer of 2008, and was immediately loaned out to Messina for the 2005–06 season. Sculli was a vital part of Messina's set-up, playing on either wing and managed 2 goals in 33 appearances.

=== Genoa ===
In 2006, Juventus were relegated to Serie B, at which point Sculli made a return to the first team. He made a few appearances in friendly matches, but was loaned to newly promoted Serie B team Genoa on 24 August. In November 2006, he was suspended 8 months for accused of match-fixing when he played for F.C. Crotone against his current club F.C. Messina at the last match-day of the 2001–02 Serie B. He was sold by Juventus to Genoa for €300,000.

In the 2007–08 season, Sculli finally made his return to football, his first match back was against Catania in Serie A's Round 2. He went on to make 35 appearances that season, scoring 4 goals. The next season, he managed a career high 9 goals in 35 Serie A appearances. The following season, Sculli made his European football debut in the Europa League, scoring goals Slavia Prague and LOSC Lille as Genoa went out in the group stages.

=== Lazio ===
Sculli was sold to Lazio on 19 January 2011 in co-ownership deal for a peppercorn fee of €500. He was assigned the number 7 shirt for his new club, becoming Lazio's first signing of the 2011 calendar year. He finished his first and second goals for Lazio during a comfortable win against Palermo on 6 March 2011.

In June 2011 Lazio bought him outright for €3 million. He scored three goals in the group stage of the Europa League against FC Vaslui, FC Zürich and Sporting CP. He returned on loan to Genoa for the second half of the 2011–12 season.

After being frozen out from the Lazio side, Sculli went on loan to Pescara for the second half of the 2012–13 season. After again being frozen out for Lazio for the 2013–14 season, Sculli again returned to Genoa for the second half of the season. At the end of his loan spell, Sculli returned to Lazio and was still frozen out of the side.

== International career ==
Sculli represented the Italy national under-21 football team, winning the 2004 UEFA European Under-21 Football Championship, and earning a bronze medal for a fourth-place finish at the 2004 Summer Olympics.

== Personal life ==
Born in Locri, the Province of Reggio Calabria, Sculli is the grandson of Giuseppe Morabito, a notorious boss of the 'Ndrangheta, the Calabrian mafia organization.

== Honours ==
=== International ===
Italy under-21

- UEFA European Under-21 Championship: 2004
- Olympic Bronze Medal: 2004
