= Matteo Trini =

Italian footballer

Personal information
- Date of birth: 18 May 1987 (age 39)
- Place of birth: Alghero, Italy
- Height: 1.78 m (5 ft 10 in)
- Position: Goalkeeper

Youth career
- ?–2005: Juventus

Senior career*
Years	Team	Apps	(Gls)
2005–2012	Juventus	0	(0)
2005–2006	→ Alghero (loan)	32	(1)
2007–2008	→ Juve Stabia (co-ownership)	13	(0)
2008–2009	→ South Tyrol (loan)	33	(0)
2009–2011	→ Lumezzane (co-ownership)	35	(0)
2012–2013	Carpi	2	(0)
2013–2014	Torres		
2014–2016	Valledoria		
2016	Lanusei Calcio		
- * Club domestic league appearances and goals

Matteo Trini (born 18 May 1987) is an Italian former footballer who played as a goalkeeper.

== Career ==
=== Juventus and early career ===
Born in Sassari, Sardinia, Trini started his career at Piedmont team Juventus. He played for Berretti under-18 team in 2004–05 season. That season Juventus was the champion of wild card group (Berretti team of Serie A, B & D clubs). Trini also played a few games in Primavera under-20 team that season, as understudy of Nicola Avitabile. In 2005–06 season he played for hometown club Alghero at Serie D (located in the Province of Sassari). He returned to Juventus after the team relegated to Serie B, wearing no.45 of the first team. Juve promoted back to Serie A at the end of season.

Trini also became the starting keeper of Primavera under-20 team, ahead Giorgio Merlano and Andrea Pozzato. He was the starting keeper in the playoffs, losing to Sampdoria in quarter-finals (eventually Samp was the runner-up).

=== Lega Pro clubs ===
Trini then left for Juve Stabia in co-ownership deal, along with Stefano Di Berardino and Giuseppe Rizza. He played 13 times in Serie C1 and in June 2008 returned to Turin for €5,000, signing a two-year contract.

On 16 July he left for South Tyrol, which he played 33 out of 34 games. He also played in the relegation "play-out", made the club remained in Seconda Divisione after winning Valenzana in 4–2.

In July 2009 he left for Lumezzane in another co-ownership deal (also extended his contract with Juve before the transfer). In the first season he was the understudy of Massimo Gazzoli and in the next season played 30 out of possible 34 games. The rest of the game was played by Gianluca Di Gennaro. In June 2011 Juventus bought back Trini again. However, he failed to find a new club.

In July 2012 he was trained with Livorno but failed to sign a contract. In November 2012 Trini left Juventus after his contract was terminated by mutual consent. On 1 December 2012, he joined Carpi.

== Honours ==
- Serie B: 2007
- Coppa Italia Lega Pro: 2010
