= Tomás Guzmán =

Paraguayan footballer (born 1982)

Personal information
- Full name: Tomás Andrés Guzmán Gaytán
- Date of birth: 7 March 1982 (age 44)
- Place of birth: Asunción, Paraguay
- Height: 1.78 m (5 ft 10 in)
- Position: Striker

Youth career
- 1998–2000: Presidente Hayes
- 2001–2002: Juventus

Senior career*
Years	Team	Apps	(Gls)
2002–2003	Ternana	24	(2)
2003–2007	Juventus	1	(0)
2003–2004	→ Messina (loan)	26	(5)
2004–2005	→ Crotone (loan)	57	(12)
2005–2006	→ Siena (loan)	10	(1)
2007	→ Spezia (loan)	16	(2)
2007–2012	Piacenza	113	(18)
2012	→ Gubbio (loan)	6	(0)
2013	Olimpia Asunción	12	(2)
2014	12 de Octubre	23	(5)
2015	San Lorenzo	11	(1)

International career
	Paraguay U20	1	(0)
- * Club domestic league appearances and goals

Tomás Andrés Guzmán Gaytán, known as Tomás Guzmán, (born 7 March 1982 in Asunción) is a retired Paraguayan football striker.

== Club career ==
Guzmán joined the Juventus youth system, one of the best youth systems in the world, from Presidente Hayes. In March 2002 he was handed a start against Arsenal in the UEFA Champions League due to Juventus rotating their squad having already qualified for the next round. Juventus won 1–0. He was then loaned out in 2002 to gain experience at Ternana. For the 2003–04 season, he was again loaned out, but this time to Messina. After Messina were promoted to Serie A, Juventus opted to loan him out to Serie B side Crotone. After a successful year with Crotone he was loaned out to Serie A side Siena for the 2005–06 Serie A season, along with several other Juventus players such as Nicola Legrottaglie, and Matteo Paro. When Juventus were relegated to Serie B for the Calciopoli scandal in 2006, Guzmán re-joined the Old Lady in their quest to return to the Italian top flight and signed a contract extension to June 2010. At Juventus, Guzmán had the oppritunity to work alongside fellow strikers and world champions Alessandro Del Piero and David Trezeguet, along with Marcelo Zalayeta, Valeri Bojinov, Raffaele Palladino, and Sebastian Giovinco. After not finding much playing time at Juventus, he was loaned out to Spezia for the remainder of the 2006–07 Serie B season. After a decent time with Spezia, he was farmed to Piacenza Calcio for the 2007–08 Serie B season, in co-ownership deal.

== International career ==
Guzmán played for Paraguay at the 2001 FIFA World Youth Championship.
