= Donato Bottone =

Italian footballer (born 1988)

Personal information
- Date of birth: 21 June 1988 (age 38)
- Place of birth: Polla, Italy
- Height: 1.80 m (5 ft 11 in)
- Position: Forward

Youth career
- 2000–2001: Villaggio Lamarmora
- 2001–2002: Biellese
- 2002–2008: Juventus

Senior career*
Years	Team	Apps	(Gls)
2008–2010	Juventus	0	(0)
2008–2009	→ Pro Patria (loan)	0	(0)
2009	→ Pro Sesto (loan)	12	(2)
2010–2011	Clermont Foot	3	(0)
2012	Honvéd II	1	(0)
2014–2015	Santhià		
2015–2016	Borgosesia	18	(7)
2016	Biellese		
2016	Potenza	4	(0)
2017	Altamura		
2017	Juventus Domo		
2017–2018	Rivoli		
- * Club domestic league appearances and goals

Donato Bottone (born 21 June 1988) is a retired Italian footballer who played as a forward.

== Career ==
Born in Polla, Campania, Bottone started his career at Piedmontese club Villaggio Lamarmora and Biellese. On 22 August 2002 Bottone was signed by Juventus. He played for Juve youth system from under-15 team, U16, U17, U18 to the reserve team - Primavera. Bottone also signed a 4-year contract in summer 2007. On 6 August 2008 Bottone and Nicola Cosentini were left for Pro Patria. Bottone was signed by Pro Sesto in January 2009. The club unable to loan Bottone to lower divisions in summer 2009. Bottone became a member of the under-18 team as overage player in 2009–10 season. On 31 August 2010 Bottone was signed by French Ligue 2 club Clermont Foot on free transfer. He signed a 1-year contract. Bottone was injured and missed the whole 2011–12 season. Bottone obtained the license as youth team coach on 30 June 2012.

On 20 November 2012 Bottone was signed by Hungarian club Budapest Honvéd FC. Bottone played once for the second team on 17 November. On 10 December 2012 he was released. He was on trial for Santhià, Bra and Cuneo in 2013–14 season.

In January 2016 Bottone reached an agreement with by Italian club Sondrio Calcio, but he never actually played for the club as he reconsidered his decision.
