= Giuseppe Rizza =

Italian footballer (1987–2020)

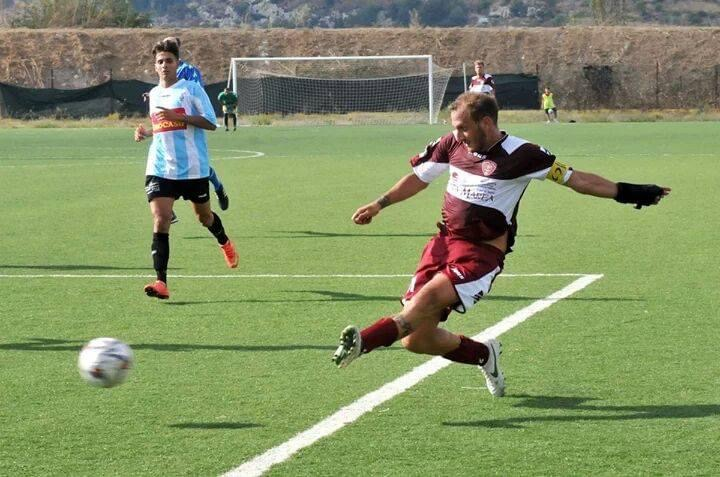

Personal information
- Full name: Giuseppe Rizza
- Date of birth: 8 April 1987
- Place of birth: Noto, Italy
- Date of death: 6 July 2020 (aged 33)
- Place of death: Catania, Italy
- Height: 1.80 m (5 ft 11 in)
- Position: Defender

Youth career
- 1995–2006: Juventus

Senior career*
Years	Team	Apps	(Gls)
2007–2008	Juve Stabia	25	(1)
2008–2012	Livorno	7	(0)
2009–2010	→ Arezzo (loan)	19	(0)
2010–2011	→ Pergocrema (loan)	18	(0)
2011	→ Juve Stabia (loan)	3	(0)
2011–2012	→ Pergocrema (loan)	16	(0)
2012–2014	Nocerina	14	(0)
2014–2016	Noto	16	(0)
- * Club domestic league appearances and goals as of 26 July 2012 ‡ National team caps and goals as of 26 July 2012

Giuseppe Rizza (8 April 1987 – 6 July 2020) was an Italian footballer who played as a defender.

== Club career ==
=== Juventus ===
Rizza went through the Juventus youth system, and after graduating, was sold to Juve Stabia in the former Italian Serie C1 in a co-ownership deal. In June 2008, he returned to Juventus for €50,000, however, along with several other youth players, he was loaned out to Serie B teams. Rizza and Francesco Volpe were sold in co-ownership deals to A.S. Livorno Calcio. At the time, the team had recently been relegated to Serie B. Rizza made 7 league appearances for Livorno during the 2008–09 Serie B campaign.

=== A.S. Livorno ===
In June 2008, Rizza was permanently sold to Livorno by Juventus for an undisclosed fee, with Juventus profiting €86,000. Upon his transfer to Livorno, Rizza was loaned out to A.C. Arezzo in July.

== Death ==
Rizza died in Catania, Italy, on 6 July 2020 due to complications from a ruptured brain aneurysm, he was 33.
