= Nicolò Corticchia =

Italian footballer (born 1993)

Personal information
- Date of birth: 11 February 1993 (age 33)
- Place of birth: Turin, Italy
- Position: Midfielder

Team information
- Current team: Cuneo

Youth career
- –2012: Juventus

Senior career*
Years	Team	Apps	(Gls)
2012–2013	Juventus	0	(0)
2012–2013	→ Carrarese (loan)	10	(0)
2013–2016	Vicenza	6	(0)
2014–2015	→ Como (loan)	10	(0)
2015–2016	→ Savona (loan)	6	(0)
2016	→ Paganese (loan)	2	(0)
2016	Bra	7	(1)
2017	Racing Roma	13	(2)
2017–2018	Racing Fondi	30	(2)
2018–2019	Fužinar	3	(0)
2019	ASD Corigliano Calabro	1	(0)
2019–2020	Bra	5	(0)
2019–2020	Vigor Lamezia		
2021	Chieti		
2021	ASD Castelnuovo Vomano	10	(1)
2021–2022	Vastese	6	(0)
2022–2023	L'Aquila		
2023–2024	Sarnese		
2024	Tivoli		
2024–2025	Valmontone 1921		
2025	Angolana		
2026–	Cuneo		
- * Club domestic league appearances and goals as of 05:49, 22 October 2026 (UTC)

Nicolò Corticchia (born 11 February 1993) is an Italian footballer who plays as a midfielder for Cuneo.

== Career ==
=== Juventus ===
Born in Turin, Piedmont, Corticchia started his career at Serie A and hometown club Juventus FC He was a member of the under-17 team in 2009–10 season. That season he was cautioned four times, thus suspended once; In the play-off round he was sent off once for the runner-up. Corticchia was the member of under-20 reserve from 2010 to 2012. Corticchia also received first team call-up in 2010–11 season from head coach Luigi Delneri. Corticchia played once for Juve in friendly in 2011–12 season, under coach Antonio Conte.

Since 2012 Lega Serie A changed the age limit of the reserve to under-19, co-currently Corticchia moved to Italian third division club Carrarese along with Francesco Margiotta and Raffaele Alcibiade. Corticchia played 10 times in 2012–13 Lega Pro Prima Divisione, half of them were included in starting eleven.

=== Vicenza ===
On 31 January 2013, Juventus sold Corticchia (for €0.6M) and Salvatore D'Elia (for €0.4M) to Serie B struggler Vicenza Calcio in definitive deal, co-currently Juve also signed youngster Michele Cavion from Vicenza for €1 million. D'Elia was remained in Venezia, while Corticchia was immediately left for Vicenza. Carrarese also sent Alcibiade back to Juve (who went to Hungary soon after) and signed Cavion in temporary deal in return. The deal made Juventus had a selling profit of €877,000 for 2012–13 season, which would counter-weight by the amortization expense of Cavion's accounting value of €984,000 equally divided from 31 January 2013 to 30 June 2017 (€222,800 per season and €92,800 in 2012–13 season), as well as speculative resold value of Cavion in the future. On Vicenza side, the club also had a short-term revenue of €1M to improve its worse financial condition but further damaged in the future by the additional amortization expense created by the signing of Corticchia and D'Elia as well as speculative player performance for the club. Corticchia was awarded no.16 shirt for the first team.

Corticchia played once for Vicenza in 2012–13 Serie B, on 13 April 2013 against Novara Calcio. He replaced Nicola Rigoni in the last minute, which Novara already secured the win by 3–1.

Vicenza relegated at the end of season and almost failed to register for 2013–14 Lega Pro Prima Divisione due to financial reason. After Vicenza submitted the supplementary documents, Corticchia and D'Elia received call-up to the pre-season camp. Corticchia played few times in friendlies. However, Corticchia was on the bench in the opening match of the season, the first round of 2013–14 Coppa Italia. Due to the injury of Giovanni Sbrissa, Corticchia made his competitive debut of the season against Varese in the second round of the cup.

On 28 August 2014 he was signed by Como in a temporary deal.

On 20 September 2015 Corticchia was signed by Savona F.B.C.

On 1 February 2016 Corticchia was signed by Paganese in a temporary deal.

On 11 August 2016 Corticchia was released by Vicenza. His contract with Vicenza was due to expire on 30 June 2017.
