= Michele Cavion =

Italian footballer (born 1994)

Personal information
- Date of birth: 8 December 1994 (age 31)
- Place of birth: Schio, Italy
- Height: 1.80 m (5 ft 11 in)
- Position: Midfielder

Team information
- Current team: Reggiana
- Number: 11

Youth career
- 2001–2002: P.G.S. Concordia
- 2002–2003: Siggi Schio
- 2003–2004: A.C. Thiene
- 2004–2013: Vicenza
- 2013: Juventus

Senior career*
Years	Team	Apps	(Gls)
2012–2013	Vicenza	1	(0)
2013–2017	Juventus	0	(0)
2013–2014	→ Reggiana (loan)	27	(1)
2014–2015	→ Feralpisalò (loan)	34	(1)
2015–2016	→ Carrarese (loan)	32	(1)
2016–2017	→ Cremonese (loan)	26	(1)
2017–2018	Cremonese	39	(6)
2018–2021	Ascoli	84	(6)
2021–2022	Salernitana	0	(0)
2021–2022	→ Brescia (loan)	10	(0)
2022	→ Vicenza (loan)	19	(2)
2022–2026	Vicenza	80	(1)
2024–2025	→ Carrarese (loan)	0	(0)
2026–	Reggiana	4	(0)
- * Club domestic league appearances and goals as of 27 September 2026

Michele Cavion (born 8 December 1994) is an Italian professional footballer who plays as midfielder for Serie C Group B club Reggiana.

== Club career ==
=== Vicenza ===
Born in Schio, Cavion started his professional career in Vicenza. On 15 December 2012, Cavion made his professional debut for Vicenza as a substitute replacing Gianvito Plasmati in the 72nd minute of a 2–0 away defeat against Empoli.

=== Juventus ===
In January 2013, Juventus signed Cavion in a 4 1/2-year contract by selling Nicolò Corticchia and Salvatore D'Elia to Vicenza. He was about to join Carrarese in the same window, but the deal collapsed. Instead, Cavion played for the reserve team of Juventus in the second half of 2012–13 season.

==== Loan to Reggiana ====
On 5 July 2013, Cavion was signed by Serie C side Reggiana on a season-long loan deal. On 1 September, he made his Serie C debut for Reggiana in a 1–1 away draw against Südtirol, he was replaced by Paolo Zanetti in the 71st minute. On 21 October, Cavion played his first entire match for Reggiana, and he scored his first professional goal in the 70th minute of a 3–2 home defeat against AlbinoLeffe. Cavion ended his season-long loan to Reggiana with 27 appearances, one goal and one assist.

==== Loan to Feralpisalò ====
On 17 July 2014, Cavion was signed by Serie C club Feralpisalò along with Marco Di Benedetto. On 10 August, he made his debut for Feralpisalò as a substitute replacing Marco Di Benedetto in the 67th minute of a 1–0 home win over Santarcangelo in the first round of Coppa Italia. On 17 August, he played in the second round as a substitute replacing Andrea Cittadino in the 85th minute of a 2–0 away defeat against Perugia. On 31 August, he made his Serie C debut for FeralpiSalò as a substitute replacing Mattia Broli in the 27th minute of a 1–0 home win over Real Vicenza. On 6 September, Cavion played his first match as a starter for FeralpiSalò, a 1–0 away defeat against Novara, he was replaced by Juan Antonio in the 80th minute. On 14 September, Cavion played his first entire match for FeralpiSalò and he scored his first goal in the 18th minute of a 3–1 away defeat against Pavia. Cavion ended his loan to FeralpiSalò with 36 appearances and two goals.

==== Loan to Carrarese ====
On 31 August 2015, Cavion was loaned to Serie C side Carrarese on a season-long loan deal. On 6 September, he made his Serie C debut for Carrarese as a substitute replacing Emanuel Gyasi in the 72nd minute of a 1–1 away draw against Robur Siena. On 26 September, Cavion played his first match as a starter for Carrarese but he was sent off with a red card in the 74th minute of a 1–0 home win over Tuttocuoio. On 29 October, he played his first entire match for Carrarese, a 1–1 away draw against Savona. On 8 May, he scored his first goal for Carrarese in the 39th minute of a 5–4 away win over Lucchese. Cavion ended his season-long loan to Carrarese with 32 appearances, one goal and three assists.

==== Loan to Cremonese ====
On 5 July 2016, Cavion was signed by Serie C club Cremonese on a season-long loan deal. On 31 July, Cavion made his debut for Cremonese in a 4–3 home win over Fermana, he was replaced by Fabio Scarsella in the 62nd minute. On 7 August, Chiavon played in the second round and he was replaced by Filippo Porcari in the 55th minute of a 2–1 away win over Cittadella. On 13 August, he played in the third round as a substitute replacing Luca Belingheri in the 54th minute of a 3–0 away defeat against Atalanta. On 28 August, he made his Serie C debut for Cremonese as a substitute replacing Fabio Scarsella in the 72nd minute of a 0–0 away draw against Viterbese Castrense. On 16 October, Cavion played his first match as a starter and he scored his first goal for Cremonese in the 48th minute of a 2–1 home win over Olbia, he was replaced in the 49th minute by Fabio Scarsella. On 30 October, he plated his first entire match for Cremonese, a 2–1 home win over Pistoiese. Cavion ended his loan to Cremonese with 29 appearances, one goal and three assists. At the end of the season Cremonese won the Serie C title and it was promoted in Serie B.

=== Cremonese ===
After his contract with Juve expired on 30 June 2017, Cavion signed with newly Serie B promoted team Cremonese with a two-year contract. Cavion started this season on 6 August with a 1–0 away win over Virtus Entella in the second round of Coppa Italia, he played the entire match. On 12 August, Cavion played in the third round as a substitute replacing Daniele Croce in the 69th minute of a 2–1 away defeat against Bari. On 25 August, Cavion made his Serie B debut as a substitute replacing Mariano Arini in the 62nd minute of a 1–0 away defeat against Parma. On 9 September, he played his first entire match of the season and he scored his first Serie B goal in the 81st minute of a 4–1 away win over Pro Vercelli. On 14 October, Cavion scored his second goal in the 96th minute of a 2–1 away win over Cittadella. On 20 December, he scored his third goal in the 60th minute of a 1–1 away draw against Venezia. Cavion ended the season with 39 appearances, six goals and two assists.

=== Ascoli ===
After only one season at Cremonese, Cavion, on 19 July 2018, joined to Serie B side Ascoli.

=== Salernitana ===
On 12 July 2021, he signed a four-year contract with Salernitana.

=== Return to Vicenza ===
On 29 January 2022, he joined Vicenza on loan until 30 June 2022. On 27 August 2022, Cavion returned to Vicenza on a permanent basis and signed a three-year contract.

On 30 August 2024, Cavion was loaned to Carrarese in Serie B for the season.

== Career statistics ==
=== Club ===
As of 29 May 2018

Appearances and goals by club, season and competition
Club	Season	League			Cup		Europe		Other		Total	
Club	Season	Division	Apps	Goals	Apps	Goals	Apps	Goals	Apps	Goals	Apps	Goals
Vicenza	2012–13	Serie B	1	0	0	0	—		—		1	0
Reggiana (loan)	2013–14	Serie C	27	1	0	0	—		—		27	1
FeralpiSalò (loan)	2014–15	Serie C	33	1	2	0	—		—		35	1
Carrarese (loan)	2015–16	Serie C	32	1	0	0	—		—		32	1
Cremonese (loan)	2016–17	Serie C	26	1	3	0	—		—		29	1
Cremonese	2017–18	Serie B	37	6	2	0	—		—		39	6
Ascoli	2018–19	Serie B	0	0	0	0	—		—		0	0
Career total			156	10	7	0	—		—		163	10

== Honours ==
Juventus Primavera

- Coppa Italia Primavera: 2012–13

Cremonese

- Serie C: 2016–17
