= Marco Duravia =

Italian footballer

Personal information
- Date of birth: 14 October 1989 (age 37)
- Place of birth: Castelfranco Veneto, Italy
- Height: 1.78 m (5 ft 10 in)
- Position: Midfielder

Youth career
- 1998–2009: Juventus

Senior career*
Years	Team	Apps	(Gls)
2009–2010	Figline	19	(0)
2010–2011	Canavese	13	(2)
2011	→ Carrarese (loan)	1	(0)
2011–2012	Montebelluna	19	(0)
2012–2017	Belluno	157	(26)
2017	Trento	13	(0)
2017–2018	Clodiense	18	(0)
2018	Cjarlins Muzane	11	(1)
2018–2019	Belluno	15	(1)
2019–2021	ACD Portomansué		
2021–2022	Vittorio Falmec		
2022	ASD Godigese		
2022–2024	ACD Galliera		
Total		266	(30)
- * Club domestic league appearances and goals

Marco Duravia (born 14 October 1989) is an Italian former footballer who plays as a midfielder.

== Club career ==
=== Juventus ===
Duravia began his career working his way through the Juventus youth ranks since 1998, before he made his way to the Primavera youth squad in 2006–07 season. In 2007, he flew to Malaysia for the International Champions Youth Cup. He classified 2nd after a loss against Manchester United F.C. In July 2008 he was picked for the annual pre-season training with Juventus first team in Pinzolo. At a later time he participated in and won the 12th Birra Moretti Trophy with the first team, and he played the final match against A.C. Milan. In February 2009 he won the 2009 Torneo di Viareggio with the reserve team and he distinguished himself for his role as an "assist man". After graduating the youth team in July 2009, he was loaned out to the Lega Pro divisions.

=== Loan Stints ===
In July 2009, Duravia was sent to the Lega Pro Prima Divisione on co-ownership deal with Figline, along with teammates Alessandro D'Antoni, Salvatore D'Elia, and Nicola Cosentini. Duravia made 19 league appearances with Figline during the season, and returned to Juventus in June 2010. He was subsequently sold in co-ownership deal during the same year, and was sent to Canavese. He remained with the club until January 2011, having made 13 league appearances during his stay, also scoring two league goals. In January 2011, he was loaned out to Carrarese, where the team won Lega Pro second division promotion playoff. he only played once in the league and 2 out of 4 playoff matches. Juventus gave up the remain 50% registration rights to Canavese in June 2011 but Canavese also released him.

=== amateur career ===
In December 2011 returned to his home region Veneto for 2011–12 Serie D club Montebelluna. On 31 August 2012 he was signed by Belluno, however, as a forward.

Duravia joined ACD Portomansué ahead of the 2019/20 season. In June 2021, he moved to Vittorio Falmec. A year later, he moved to Godigese. His departure from the club was confirmed on 28 November 2022. On 6 December 2022, Duravia signed with Galliera.
