= Andrea Pozzato =

Italian footballer (born 1988)

Personal information
- Date of birth: 15 May 1988 (age 38)
- Place of birth: Novara, Italy
- Height: 1.93 m (6 ft 4 in)
- Position: Goalkeeper

Team information
- Current team: Trapani

Youth career
- Juventus

Senior career*
Years	Team	Apps	(Gls)
2007–2008	Juventus	0	(0)
2007–2008	→ Tritium (loan)	34	(0)
2008–2010	Canavese	58	(0)
2010–2011	Melfi	26	(0)
2012–	Trapani	2	(0)
- * Club domestic league appearances and goals as of 22:23, 29 May 2012 (UTC)

Andrea Pozzato (born 15 May 1988) is an Italian professional footballer who plays as a goalkeeper, currently contracted with Trapani.

== Career ==
=== Juventus ===
Pozzato began his professional career within the youth ranks of Serie A giants, Juventus. In 2006–07 season he was the backup of Matteo Trini along with Giorgio Merlano. Pozzato was graduated from the Primavera youth squad in 2007, and was loaned out to Tritium for his first full season, in attempt to gain regular playing time. The young keeper managed to obtain a starting position at the club, making 34 starts in his lone season.

=== Lega Pro career ===
In summer 2008 he left for Lega Pro Seconda Divisione team Canavese in co-ownership deal. In June 2010 Juve gave up the remain 50% registration rights to Canavese.

In July 2010 he left Canavese to join Melfi. After spending the first half of the 2011–12 season as a free agent, he signed a contract in January 2012 to become second goalkeeper at Lega Pro Prima Divisione promotion hopefuls Trapani; he played two regular season games, plus both legs in the subsequent promotion playoff semifinals against Cremonese (ended in a win for his side).
