= Marco Pecorari =

Italian footballer

Personal information
- Date of birth: 21 September 1977 (age 49)
- Place of birth: Palmanova, Italy
- Height: 1.87 m (6 ft 2 in)
- Position: Defender

Team information
- Current team: Juventus (U17 assistant coach)

Youth career
- Juventus

Senior career*
Years	Team	Apps	(Gls)
1996–1997	Fiorenzuola	25	(4)
1997–1998	Empoli	3	(0)
1998–1999	Genoa	17	(0)
1999–2003	Crotone	122	(7)
2003–2005	Triestina	74	(8)
2005–2007	Lecce	10	(1)
2006–2007	→ Ascoli (loan)	15	(1)
2007–2008	Spezia	25	(1)
2008	→ Ravenna (loan)	15	(1)
2008–2009	Avellino	31	(3)
2009–2014	Arezzo	91	(4)
2014–2015	Vado	1	(0)

International career
1994	Italy U17	2	(0)
1995	Italy U18	4	(0)
1995–1996	Italy U19	11	(0)

Managerial career
- 2013–2014: Arezzo (youth)
- 2015–2016: Lucento (youth)
- 2016–2017: Chieri (youth)
- 2017–2018: Chieri (assistant)
- 2018–2020: Chieri (youth)
- 2020–2021: Sisport FIAT
- 2021–: Juventus (U17 assistant coach)
- * Club domestic league appearances and goals

Marco Pecorari (born 21 September 1977) is an Italian football coach and a former defender. He is an assistant coach with the Under-17 squad of Juventus.

== Career ==
Born in Palmanova, in Friuli region, Pecorari started his professional career at Fiorenzuola. He was signed by Empoli in the next season.

He was a player of Crotone until 2003, which he was signed by Triestina. In May 2005 Pecorari was signed by Lecce. In August 2006 he was loaned to Ascoli.

In January 2007 Pecorari was signed by Spezia in a definitive deal. On 31 January 2008 he was loaned to Ravenna.

In September 2008 Pecorari was signed by Avellino.

=== Arezzo ===
In 2009, he was signed by A.C. Arezzo. After the bankruptcy of the company and rebirth as Atletico Arezzo, Pecorari remained with the new company until 2014.
