= Nicola Cosentini =

Italian footballer

Personal information
- Date of birth: 14 June 1988 (age 38)
- Place of birth: Cosenza, Italy
- Height: 1.82 m (6 ft 0 in)
- Position: Midfielder

Youth career
- 2000–2001: Azzurra Rende
- 2001–2008: Juventus

Senior career*
Years	Team	Apps	(Gls)
2008–2009	Juventus	0	(0)
2008–2009	→ Pro Patria (loan)	16	(0)
2009–2010	Figline	16	(0)
2010–2011	Viareggio	7	(0)
2011–2012	Pro Imperia	16	(0)
2012	Asti	0	(0)
2012	Taranto	3	(0)
2012–2013	Montalto Uffugo	8	(0)
2013	Kruoja Pakruojis	0	(0)
2013	Tauras Tauragė	9	(1)
2013–2014	Parma	0	(0)
2013–2014	→ Mosta (loan)	5	(0)
2014	Gavorrano	0	(0)
2014–2015	Savona	0	(0)
2015–2016	L'Aquila	30	(0)
2016	Rieti	14	(0)
2017	Caratese	4	(0)
2017	FBC Gravina	0	(0)
2017–2018	US Levico Terme	29	(0)
2018	ASD Trebisacce Calcio		
2018–2019	AC Locri 1909	11	(0)
2019–2025	ASD Brutium Cosenza		

International career
2004	Italy U16	4	(0)
2004	Italy U17	1	(0)
- * Club domestic league appearances and goals as of 09:53, 8 October 2026 (UTC)

Nicola Cosentini (born 14 June 1988) is an Italian footballer who plays as a midfielder.

== Career ==
=== Lega Pro ===
Cosentini started his career working his way through the Juventus FC youth ranks, before he made his way to the Primavera youth squad in 2006. He never managed a senior team debut with Juventus during the season, but after graduating the youth team in July 2008, he was loaned to Pro Patria, then sold to third division club, A.S. Figline in co-ownership deal, along with teammates, Marco Duravia, Salvatore D'Elia (loan), and Alessandro D'Antoni. He scored 1 goal in 16 appearances for the club during the 2009–10 Lega Pro Prima Divisione season. On 25 June 2010 Juventus brought back Cosentini and sold to Viareggio on 8 July 2010 along with Carlo Pinsoglio, D'Antoni and Giorgio Merlano. In June 2011 Juventus gave up the remain 50% registration rights. However Cosentini also excluded from the squad of Viareggio and terminated the contract in mutual consent in December 2011

=== Serie D ===
Cosentini spent rest of the 2011–12 Serie D season with Pro Imperia. He joined another Serie D team Asti in August but later left for Taranto. In December he moved to Montalto Uffugo.

=== Abroad ===
He moved to Lithuanian A lyga club Kruoja Pakruojis in March 2013 but due to difficult financial circumstances of the club, in April 2013 he chose to join another Lithuanian A lyga club Tauras Tauragė.

=== Parma ===
Cosentini returned to Italy for Parma. Circa October he was signed by Maltese club Mosta. On 31 January 2014 he was signed by Italian fourth division club Gavorrano in co-ownership.

=== Lega Pro ===
In July 2014 Cosentini was signed by Savona. In January 2015 he was signed by L'Aquila.

On 23 August 2016 he was signed by Rieti.

=== Later career ===
In July 2019, Cosentini joined Brutium Cosenza.
