= Oussama Essabr =

Moroccan footballer

Personal information
- Date of birth: 19 January 1989 (age 37)
- Place of birth: Tiddas, Morocco
- Height: 1.76 m (5 ft 9 in)
- Position: Striker

Youth career
- 1999–2008: Juventus FC

Senior career*
Years	Team	Apps	(Gls)
2008–2012	Juventus FC	0	(0)
2008–2009	→ Vicenza Calcio	4	(0)
2009–2010	→ A.C. Arezzo	21	(2)
2010–2011	→ Cosenza Calcio 1914	21	(4)
2012	→ F.C. Crotone	2	(1)
2013	→ A.C. Prato	11	(3)
2014	→ S.E.F. Torres 1903	6	(0)
2016	→ Vigor Lamezia	3	(0)
- * Club domestic league appearances and goals

Oussama Essabr (Arabic: أسامة إسبر; born 19 January 1989) is a Moroccan footballer who has played as a forward in Italy for Juventus FC, Vicenza Calcio, A.C. Arezzo, Cosenza Calcio, F.C. Crotone, A.C. Prato, S.E.F. Torres 1903 and Vigor Lamezia

== Career ==
=== Juventus ===
Essabr came through the Juventus youth system, and after a very successful time with the Primavera squad, he was loaned to Serie B side Vicenza. In June 2009, he returned to Juventus, but was loaned again in August 2009, this time to Lega Pro Prima Divisione side Arezzo. He went on to make 18 appearances and scored once during the 2009–10 Lega Pro campaign before returning to Juventus in June 2010. Essabr spent the next two seasons on loan, at Cosenza and Crotone respectively, appearing 23 times and scoring 5 goals.
