= Salvatore D'Elia =

Italian footballer (born 1989)

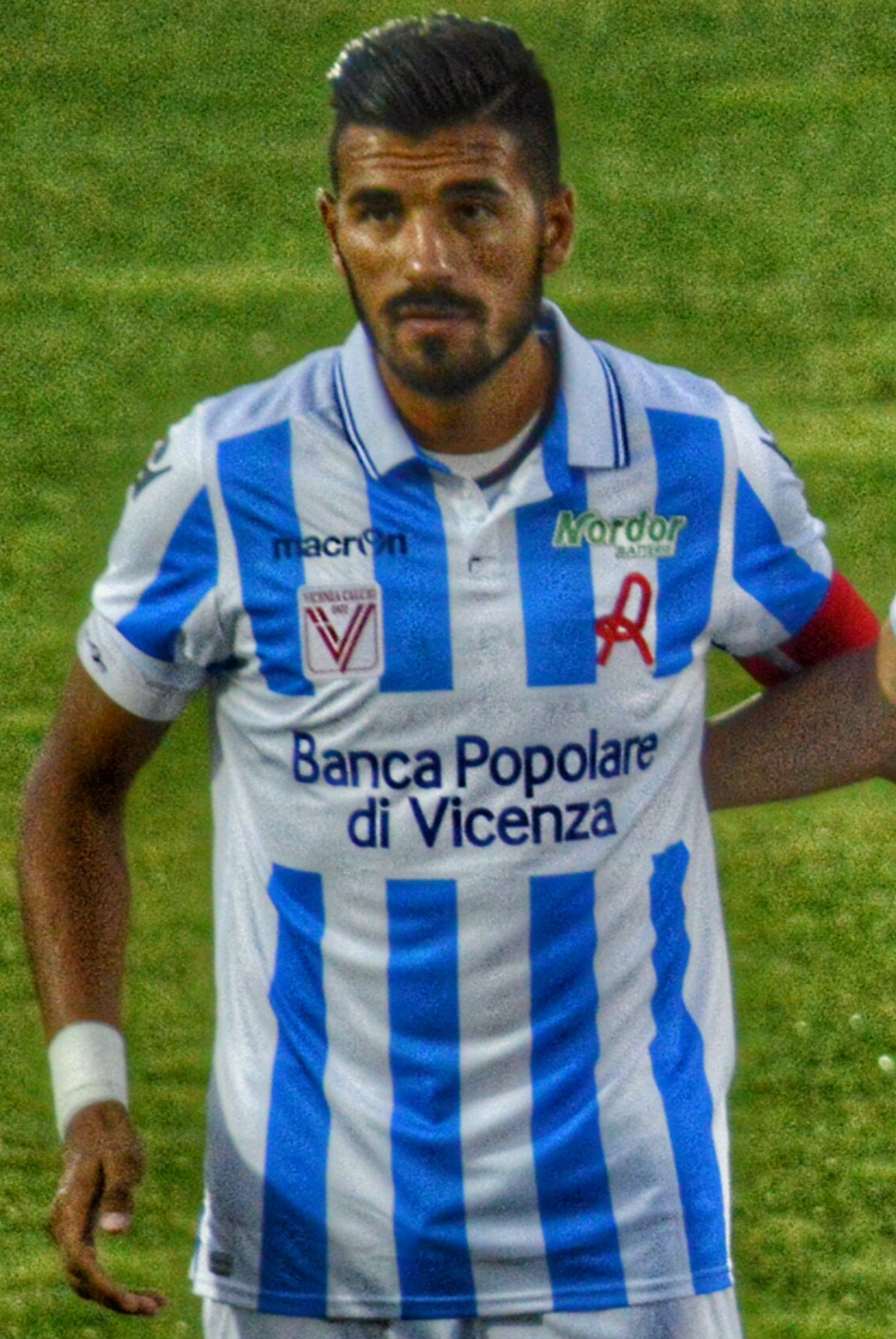
- Salvatore D'Elia

Personal information
- Date of birth: 10 February 1989 (age 37)
- Place of birth: Mugnano di Napoli, Italy
- Height: 1.84 m (6 ft 0 in)
- Position: Left back

Youth career
- 1998–2009: Juventus

Senior career*
Years	Team	Apps	(Gls)
2009–2013	Juventus	0	(0)
2009–2010	→ Figline (loan)	16	(1)
2010–2011	→ Portogruaro (loan)	12	(0)
2012–2013	→ Venezia (loan)	14	(0)
2013–2017	Vicenza	103	(2)
2017–2018	Bari	18	(2)
2018–2020	Ascoli	34	(0)
2020–2022	Frosinone	26	(0)
2022–2024	Chieri	16	(0)
Total		239	(5)

International career
2009–2010	Italy U20	3	(0)
- * Club domestic league appearances and goals

Salvatore D'Elia (born 10 February 1989) is an Italian former footballer who plays as a left back.

== Club career ==
=== Juventus ===
D'Elia started his career working his way through the Juventus youth ranks since 1998, before he made his way to the Primavera youth squad in 2007. After being promoted from the youth sector of the Turin-based club, D'Elia was sent out on loan the following season.

=== Loan Stints ===
He never managed a senior team debut with Juventus, but after graduating the youth team in July 2009, he was loaned out to third-tier club, A.S. Figline, along with teammates, Marco Duravia, Nicola Cosentini, and Alessandro D'Antoni. He made 18 appearances in his first season with the club, and returned to Juventus on 2 July 2010. D'Elia was then sent out again on loan to newly promoted Serie B outfit Portogruaro, ahead of the 2010–11 Serie B campaign, where he went on to make just 12 league appearances. On 30 June 2011, D'Elia returned to Juventus, and spent the entire 2011–12 Serie A campaign training and playing with the youth sector. Prior to the 2012–13 Serie A season, however, he was farmed out on loan to Lega Pro Prima Divisione outfit Venice.

=== Vicenza ===
On 31 January 2013, he was officially sold to Vicenza Calcio (for €400,000) along with Nicolò Corticchia (for €600,000), as part of the deal that saw Michele Cavion transfer to Juventus for €1 million. D'Elia remained on loan at Venezia until 30 June 2013. D'Elia signed a 3 1/2-year contract with Vicenza.

D'Elia was assigned the number 3 shirt in the 2014–15 season. However, in the 2015–16 season, the club assigned a new shirt number (number 6) to D'Elia, as the no.3 shirt was retired for former Vicenza footballer and coach, late Giulio Savoini. On 8 June 2015, D'Elia signed a new three-year contract.

On 22 December 2016, D'Elia signed a new contract with Vicenza, which would last until 30 June 2020.

=== Ascoli ===
On 9 August 2018 he joined Serie B club Ascoli on a 3-year contract.

=== Frosinone ===
On 14 January 2020, he signed with Serie B club Frosinone.

=== Chieri ===
On 3 October 2022, D'Elia moved to Chieri in Serie D.

== Career statistics ==
As of match played on 24 February 2018

Appearances and goals by club, season and competition
Club	Season	League			Cup		Other		Total	
Club	Season	Division	Apps	Goals	Apps	Goals	Apps	Goals	Apps	Goals
Figline (loan)	2009–10	Lega Pro Prima Divisione	16	1	0	0	0	0	16	1
Portogruaro (loan)	2010–11	Serie B	12	0	1	0	0	0	13	0
Venezia (loan)	2012–13	Lega Pro Seconda Divisione	14	0	0	0	0	0	14	0
Vicenza	2013–14	Lega Pro Prima Divisione	25	0	2	0	0	0	27	0
Vicenza	2014–15	Serie B	22	0	1	0	0	0	23	0
Vicenza	2015–16	Serie B	37	2	3	0	0	0	40	2
Vicenza	2016–17	Serie B	19	0	0	0	0	0	19	0
Vicenza	Total		103	2	6	0	0	0	109	2
Bari 1908	2017–18	Serie B	13	2	3	0	0	0	16	2
Career totals			158	5	10	0	0	0	168	5
