= Francesco Volpe =

Italian footballer

Personal information
- Full name: Francesco Massimiliano Volpe
- Date of birth: 3 March 1986 (age 40)
- Place of birth: Naples, Italy
- Height: 1.80 m (5 ft 11 in)
- Position: Forward

Team information
- Current team: Piacenza 1919

Youth career
- –2004: Genoa
- 2004–2006: Juventus

Senior career*
Years	Team	Apps	(Gls)
2002–2004	Genoa	2	(0)
2006–2007	Ravenna	28	(4)
2007–2011	Livorno	33	(0)
2009–2010	→ Triestina (loan)	22	(2)
2010–2011	→ SPAL (loan)	12	(3)
2011–2012	Piacenza	27	(2)
2012–2013	Lupa Piacenza	22	(3)
2013–	Piacenza	32	(8)

International career
2003–2004	Italy U18	4	(1)
2004–2005	Italy U19	7	(2)
- * Club domestic league appearances and goals

Francesco Massimiliano Volpe (born 3 March 1986) is an Italian footballer who plays as a forward for Piacenza.

== Football career ==
Volpe joined Juventus along with Domenico Criscito in 2004 in co-ownership deal, for €1.9M (both priced €1.9M in full ownership, but sold back 50% to for €0.95M and €0.95M, and paid via the transfer of Antonio Nocerino in co-ownership deal, priced €450,000).

They went through the Juventus youth system. Volpe was bought permanently in June 2005 for another €250,000, as Genoa cut €700,000. In 2006, he joined Ravenna Calcio, on loan from Juventus with option to sign 50% rights for €450,000, which Ravenna did in June. In July 2007 he joined A.S. Livorno Calcio of Serie A in another co-ownership deal. Livorno paid Juve €1M and Juve paid the same amount to Ravenna to acquire him.

In July 2009 he was loaned to Triestina, where he made 15 starts in 22 league appearances. In June 2011 Juventus gave up the remain 50% registration rights to Livorno, made a write-down of €617,000.

On 31 August he was sold to Piacenza in another co-ownership deal. for €500, along with Fabrizio Di Bella on loan. They were part of the deals that Antonio Piccolo joined Livorno. During the season Piacenza bankrupted and a new entity "Lupa Piacenza" restarted in amateur level. In September 2012 Volpe signed a 1-year deal with Lupa Piacenza.

== Honours ==
Juventus Primavera

- Torneo di Viareggio (1): 2005
- Campionato Primavera (1): 2005–06

Ravenna

- Serie C1 (1): 2006–07

Lupa Piacenza

- Eccellenza Emilia–Romagna (1): 2012–13
