= Giorgio Merlano =

Italian footballer

Personal information
- Date of birth: 19 July 1988 (age 38)
- Place of birth: Tortona, Italy
- Height: 1.84 m (6 ft 0 in)
- Position: Goalkeeper

Team information
- Current team: ASD Arquatese Valli Borbera

Youth career
- Juventus

Senior career*
Years	Team	Apps	(Gls)
2008–2010	Juventus	0	(0)
2008–2009	→ Melfi (loan)	16	(0)
2009–2010	→ Canavese (loan)	4	(0)
2010–2012	Viareggio	12	(0)
2012–2013	Treviso	11	(0)
2014–2015	Thermal Teolo	7	(0)
2015–2016	Campodarsego	24	(0)
2016	Altovicentino	8	(0)
2017	Pro Settimo	7	(0)
2017–2022	Fossano Calcio	89	(0)
2022–	ASD Arquatese Valli Borbera		
- * Club domestic league appearances and goals as of 8 October 2026

Giorgio Merlano (born 19 July 1988) is an Italian footballer who plays as a goalkeeper for ASD Arquatese Valli Borbera.

== Career ==
Merlano began his career within the Juventus FC youth set-up, and graduated the Primavera squad in 2008. Merlano was the understudy of Matteo Trini in 2006–07 season. Merlano became the first choice of the "spring" in 2007–08. Merlano was loaned out to A.S. Melfi for the 2008–2009 campaign, where he made 16 first team appearances. He returned to Juventus in the summer of 2009, only to be loaned out to F.C. Canavese for the 2009–2010 season. He spent much of the season as a second choice keeper, playing behind fellow Juventus loaner, Andrea Pozzato. With Canavese, Merlano did manage 4 league appearances. He officially returned to Juventus on 1 July 2010, following the expiration of his loan deal with Canavese.

In July 2010 he was sold to Lega Pro Prima Divisione side F.C. Esperia Viareggio in co-ownership deal. He was the understudy of fellow Juventus youth product Carlo Pinsoglio, played 10 times in the league and 5 times in the cup.

In June 2011 Juventus gave up the remain 50% registration rights to Viareggio. On 20 July 2012 Merlano was signed by F.C. Treviso.
