= Nicola Legrottaglie =

Italian footballer (born 1976)

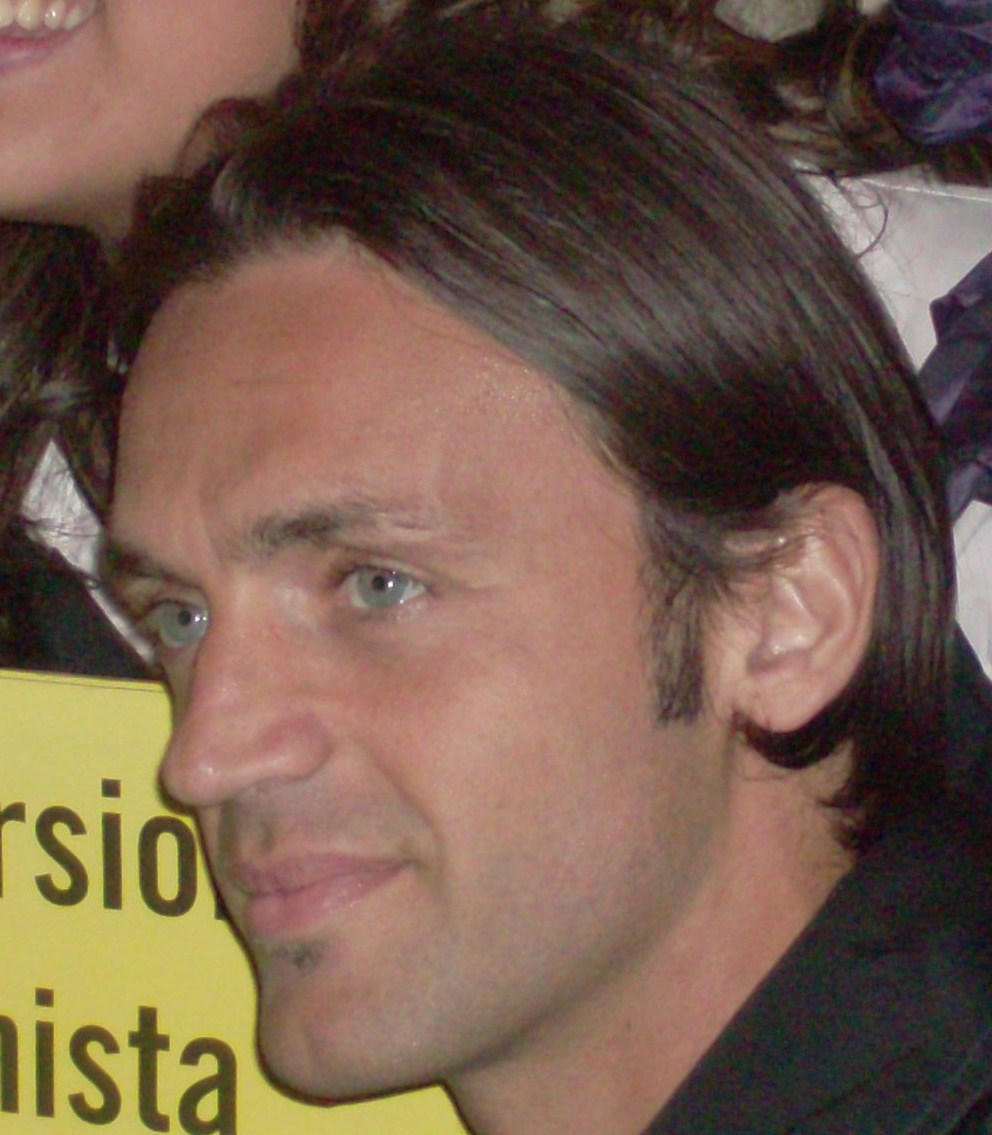
- Legrottaglie in 2010

Personal information
- Date of birth: 20 October 1976 (age 50)
- Place of birth: Gioia del Colle, Italy
- Height: 1.90 m (6 ft 3 in)
- Position: Centre back

Youth career
- –1996: Bari

Senior career*
Years	Team	Apps	(Gls)
1996–1998	Bari	0	(0)
1996–1997	→ Pistoiese (loan)	31	(3)
1997–1998	→ Prato (loan)	26	(0)
1998–2003	Chievo	66	(6)
2000	→ Reggiana (loan)	4	(1)
2000–2001	→ Modena (loan)	32	(1)
2003–2011	Juventus	114	(8)
2005	→ Bologna (loan)	9	(0)
2005–2006	→ Siena (loan)	28	(0)
2011	AC Milan	1	(0)
2011–2014	Catania	75	(8)
Total		386	(27)

International career
1994	Italy U18	1	(0)
2002–2010	Italy	16	(1)

Managerial career
- 2014–2015: Bari U17
- 2015–2016: Akragas
- 2017: Cagliari (assistant)
- 2019–2020: Pescara U19
- 2020: Pescara
- 2023–2024: Sampdoria (technical director)
- * Club domestic league appearances and goals

Nicola Legrottaglie (Italian pronunciation: [niˈkɔːla leɡrotˈtaʎʎe]; born 20 October 1976) is an Italian former professional footballer who played as a centre back.

In a senior career that lasted two full decades, he amassed Serie A totals of 259 matches and 22 goals over 12 seasons, representing in the competition Chievo, Juventus, Bologna, Siena, AC Milan and Catania. He won the 2011 national championship with the fifth club.

Legrottaglie earned 16 caps for Italy, appearing for the nation at the 2009 Confederations Cup.

== Club career ==
=== Early years and Chievo ===
Born in Gioia del Colle, Province of Bari, Legrottaglie began his career with local club Bari, having loan spells at Pistoiese and Prato. Following his return in June 1998, he was sold to Chievo of the Serie B, appearing rarely in his second season with the team; in January 2000, he moved on loan to Reggiana in the third division. With his new club, he also found playing opportunities hard to come by and, after his return to Verona, he moved to the same level and also on loan, now with Modena.

Legrottaglie was ever-present in the starting XI during his spell at Modena, subsequently returning to Chievo for their first-ever season in Serie A. He only appeared in 15 games as the team qualified for the UEFA Cup; in his second season, the defender established himself as a top division player, scoring four goals in 32 league appearances to help to another comfortable mid-table finish (seventh).

=== Juventus ===
In the 2003 off-season, Legrottaglie was rewarded with a move to Juventus. The club paid €7.55million for his services to Chievo, €0.45 million being used in selling 50% of the rights to Giuseppe Sculli, Matteo Paro and Daniele Gastaldello.

Legrottaglie was a full member of the first-team squad in the 2003–04 season, taking part in 21 games and netting twice under coach Marcello Lippi. However, his poor performances during his debut season saw him win the 2004 Bidone d'Oro Award, which is given to the worst Serie A player in a particular season. Following the appointment of new manager Fabio Capello, he fell down the defensive pecking order, making just two appearances in five months; he thus moved on loan to Bologna in the 2005 January transfer window, playing eleven matches – including twice in the promotion playoffs – for the Emilia-Romagna side.

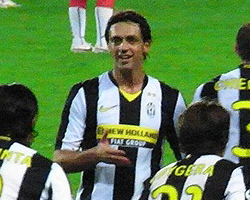
Legrotagglie playing for Juventus in 2008

Legrottaglie returned to Juventus in the summer of 2005, but was instantly loaned out to Siena for the 2005–06 campaign, alongside teammate Igor Tudor and some youth players. While at the latter he was again a regular, as his team finally avoided relegation.

Back at Juve, and as an experienced player, Legrottaglie was expected to play a role in the club's attempt to return to the top level following the 2006 Calciopoli scandal. However, he would only take the field in ten fixtures out of 42 – also being shown a red card – in a promotion as champions.

Subsequently, Legrottaglie came very close to complete a transfer to Beşiktaş on a three-year contract, worth £1.1 million per season. The Turks were set to pay £1.6 million to acquire his services, but negotiations broke down at the last minute and hence, the player remained in Turin; under Claudio Ranieri, he started the new season right where he left off, on the substitutes' bench, being fourth-choice behind Jorge Andrade, Jean-Alain Boumsong and Domenico Criscito.

Just four matches into the season, however, a serious knee injury sidelined Andrade for several months, and Legrottaglie was promoted to the starting eleven for the game against Reggina on 26 September, scoring the opener in a 4–0 rout. Criscito was loaned out to Genoa in January 2008 and, from then onwards, he was paired with Giorgio Chiellini in central defence, as the side allowed just nine goals in the first 14 matches following Andrade's injury (37 overall), finishing in third place. His contract ran originally until 30 June 2008; but, in October 2007, due to his excellent form, he was awarded a two-year extension.

In the 2008–09 season, Legrottaglie continued to be first-choice despite the arrival of Olof Mellberg from Aston Villa (Andrade also was expected to return to first-team action, but he suffered a second serious knee injury). In September 2008, one month shy of his 32nd birthday, he signed another deal until June 2011, and played 27 league matches in a runner-up finish, thus qualifying for the UEFA Champions League for the second consecutive year; veteran Fabio Cannavaro returned to the club following his spell with Real Madrid, and this relegated him to the bench for parts of the 2009–10 campaign. He ended the season with 19 league appearances, netting once.

Legrottaglie was injured during training in late May 2010, and thus missed out on the United States tour.

=== Milan ===
On 31 January 2011, after Juventus signed central defender Andrea Barzagli, the 34-year-old Legrottaglie – who made just eight appearances in all competitions comprised during the first half of the season, under new manager Luigi Delneri – left on a free transfer for fellow league side AC Milan, signing a six-month deal. However, he was only able to make one league appearance for the eventual champions due to a serious head injury suffered during a 0–0 draw with Lazio.

Legrottaglie was released on 30 June, following the expiration of his contract.

=== Catania ===
On 24 August 2011, Legrottaglie joined Catania on a two-year contract. He scored on his official debut, a 3–3 away draw against Novara.

Legrottaglie revived his career overall under Vincenzo Montella. He finished 2011–12 with 35 official games and six goals, helping the Sicilians to a fourth successive season in which they broke their record points total in Serie A, finishing 11th.

== International career ==
Legrottaglie made his debut for Italy on 20 November 2002, in a friendly match with Turkey in Pescara, and went on to appear in a further six matches in a one-year span, mostly friendlies. He scored his only goal in April 2003, in a 2–1 victory over Switzerland.

Following solid performances at Juventus, Legrottaglie received his first cap in four years, appearing in a friendly against Austria while filling in for injured teammate Chiellini in an 18 August 2008 contest held in Nice. His former Juventus coach Lippi was in charge of the national team.

On 2 May 2010, 33-year-old Legrottaglie was included in a 29-man provisional list for the 2010 FIFA World Cup, attending the training camp in Rome, but was subsequently dropped from the 30-player list submitted to FIFA on the 11th, with Villarreal's Giuseppe Rossi and Roma's Daniele De Rossi taking his place. His only major international tournament was the 2009 FIFA Confederations Cup in South Africa, with Italy exiting in the group stage.

=== International stats ===
National team	Year	Apps	Goals
Italy
Italy	2002	1	0
Italy	2003	5	1
Italy	2004	1	0
Italy	2008	3	0
Italy	2009	6	0
Italy	2010	0	0
Total		16	1

Scores and results list Italy's goal tally first, score column indicates score after each Legrottaglie goal.

#	Date	Venue	Opponent	Score	Result	Competition
1	30 April 2003	Stade de Genève, Lancy, Switzerland	Switzerland	1–1	2–1	Friendly

== Coaching and managerial career ==
Legrottaglie retired at the end of the 2013–14 campaign as Catania suffered top-flight relegation, aged nearly 38. He then returned to Bari after 18 years, being appointed under-17 team manager.

Legrottaglie took his first role as a head coach in July 2015, accepting an offer from Sicilian Lega Pro club Akragas. He resigned the following January due to poor results; on 9 January 2017, he was named as the new assistant to Massimo Rastelli at Cagliari in the Italian top division. In October, when the latter was dismissed, he too left.

On 24 June 2019, Legrottaglie was announced as the new under-19 manager of Pescara, replacing Luciano Zauri after the latter's promotion to first-team manager. On 21 January 2020, he was promoted to head coach after Zauri's resignation from his post.

On 28 June 2023, Legrottaglie was officially unveiled as the new "head of performance" (technical area director) of Sampdoria after the club's takeover by a consortium led by Andrea Radrizzani, working alongside first team head coach and former Juventus teammate Andrea Pirlo.

== Style of play ==
Legrottaglie was praised by pundits for his physical attributes and his ability in the air, making him a goal threat from set pieces. A strong yet elegant player, he excelled in sliding challenges and at organising high defensive lines, also being gifted with good technical ability, passing range and vision, which allowed him to advance into the midfield. He was also tactically versatile, excelling at reading the game and possessing a powerful shot from distance.

Despite his reputation, Legrottaglie was also criticised at times for inconsistency and lapses in man-marking.

== Personal life ==
Legrottaglie attracted controversy when he condemned homosexuality in his 2009 autobiography, calling it a "sin" according to his Christian beliefs. He is a member of the Italian Evangelical Alliance (an offspring of the World Evangelical Alliance), a Protestant charismatic denomination, and of the Athletes of Christ. Also for reasons of faith, he did not have sexual intercourse with his wife Erika during the five years before their marriage.

== Managerial statistics ==
As of 6 July 2020

Team	Nat	From	To	Record				
Team	Nat	From	To	G	W	D	L	Win %
Akragas	(Italy)	23 July 2015	17 January 2016	23	9	4	10	39.13
Pescara	(Italy)	21 January 2020	6 July 2020	12	4	1	7	33.33
Total				35	13	5	17	37.14

== Honours ==
Modena

- Serie C1: 2000-01
- Supercoppa di Serie C: 2001

Juventus

- Serie A: 2004–05 (revoked due to the Calciopoli scandal)
- Coppa Italia runner-up: 2003–04
- Supercoppa Italiana: 2003
- Serie B: 2006–07

AC Milan

- Serie A: 2010–11
