= Matteo Paro =

Italian footballer

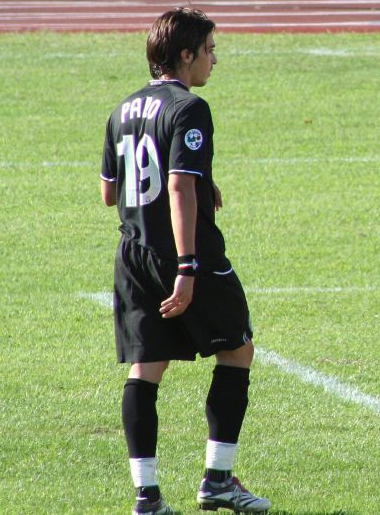
- Paro playing for Juventus in 2006

Personal information
- Date of birth: 17 March 1983 (age 43)
- Place of birth: Asti, Italy
- Height: 1.78 m (5 ft 10 in)
- Position: Midfielder

Youth career
- 2000–2002: Juventus

Senior career*
Years	Team	Apps	(Gls)
2000–2003	Juventus	1	(0)
2003–2005	Chievo	0	(0)
2004–2005	→ Crotone (loan)	54	(5)
2005–2006	Siena	28	(0)
2006–2007	Juventus	28	(1)
2007–2012	Genoa	20	(0)
2009–2010	→ Bari (loan)	0	(0)
2010	→ Piacenza (loan)	4	(0)
2010–2012	→ Vicenza (loan)	47	(4)
2013–2014	SPAL	12	(0)
2014–2015	Mantova	29	(2)
2015–2016	Crotone	13	(0)
Total		236	(12)

International career
2003	Italy U-20	6	(1)
- * Club domestic league appearances and goals

Matteo Paro (born 17 March 1983) is an Italian football coach and former player who played as a midfielder.

== Playing career ==
=== Juventus ===
Paro made his Serie A debut on 17 May 2003, in a 2–1 loss to Reggina.

=== Chievo ===
In the summer of 2003, Juventus sold half of Paro's contract to Chievo in July for €450,000 total fee along with Sculli and Gastaldello as part of the deal that sent defender Nicola Legrottaglie the other way. Paro himself was valued for €50,000 only (50% rights).

=== Siena ===
In 2005, Juventus bought back all three for €1.05 million (€350,000 each). But Paro and Gastaldello were sold to Siena in another joint-ownership deal for €450,000 each.

=== Return to Juventus ===
In 2006, Juventus was relegated to Serie B and bought back Paro's 50% rights from Siena for an undisclosed fee. He also holds the distinction of scoring Juventus' first ever Serie B goal during a 1–1 away draw with Rimini on 9 September 2006.

=== Genoa ===
In the summer of 2007, he was sold to Genoa in a joint-ownership deal for €1.5 million, reuniting with Sculli.

Juventus received another €2 million for the player in June 2008.

In July 2009, Paro joined newly promoted side Bari on loan. The club also signed Riccardo Meggiorini, Leonardo Bonucci, Andrea Ranocchia (loan) and Giuseppe Greco (loan) from Genoa. On 29 January 2010, Bari loaned the midfielder to Piacenza.

=== Vicenza ===
In the summer of 2010, he left on loan for Vicenza. In the summer of 2011, Danilo Russo returned to Genoa, and Paro joined Vicenza in another temporary deal.

== Coaching career ==
After spending his two final seasons as a player at Mantova and Crotone, both times under head coach Ivan Jurić, Paro retired in order to join the Croatian's staff in 2017 at Genoa, initially as a match analyst. In 2019, he became Jurić's assistant coach at Hellas Verona, then following him in all of his successive coaching jobs at Torino, Roma and Southampton.
