= 2009–10 Juventus FC season =

Italian football club season

Juventus
2009–10 season
- President: Jean-Claude Blanc
- Manager: Ciro Ferrara (until 29 January 2010); Alberto Zaccheroni (from 29 January 2010)
- Stadium: Stadio Olimpico di Torino
- Serie A: 7th
- Coppa Italia: Quarter-finals
- UEFA Champions League: Group stage (3rd)
- UEFA Europa League: Round of 16
- Top goalscorer: League: Alessandro Del Piero (9); All: Alessandro Del Piero (11)
- Highest home attendance: 27,801 vs Bayern Munich (8 December 2009, Champions League)
- Lowest home attendance: 10,112 vs Napoli (13 January 2010, Coppa Italia)
- Average home league attendance: 22,924
Home colours	Away colours	Third colours

The 2009–10 season was Juventus Football Club's 112th in existence and third consecutive season in the top flight of Italian football.

Domestically, the team competed in Serie A, finishing seventh, as well as in the Coppa Italia, where they were eliminated in the quarter-finals. Having finished second in 2008–09, Juventus automatically qualified for a place in the group stage of the UEFA Champions League. After drawing their first two games, against Bordeaux and Bayern Munich, and winning their next two, a double header against Maccabi Haifa, the team lost their last two group stage games, including a 4–1 home defeat against Bayern Munich on the last matchday. As a result, they finished third in their group and qualified for a place in the Round of 32 in the UEFA Europa League. In this secondary competition, Juventus were knocked out in the Round of 16 after the second leg ended as a 4–1 (5–4 on aggregate) loss for the second time in Europe, this time in England against Fulham.

== Players ==
=== Squad information ===
As of 1 March 2010

Note: Flags indicate national team as defined under FIFA eligibility rules; some limited exceptions apply. Players may hold more than one non-FIFA nationality.

No.	Pos.	Nation	Player
1	GK	ITA	Gianluigi Buffon
2	DF	URU	Martín Cáceres ^{EL}
3	DF	ITA	Giorgio Chiellini ^{EL}
4	MF	BRA	Felipe Melo ^{EL}
5	DF	ITA	Fabio Cannavaro ^{EL}
6	DF	ITA	Fabio Grosso ^{EL}
7	MF	BIH	Hasan Salihamidžić ^{EL}
8	MF	ITA	Claudio Marchisio ^{EL}
9	FW	ITA	Vincenzo Iaquinta ^{EL}
10	FW	ITA	Alessandro Del Piero ^{EL} (captain)
11	FW	BRA	Amauri ^{EL}
12	GK	ITA	Antonio Chimenti ^{EL}
13	GK	AUT	Alexander Manninger ^{EL}
15	DF	FRA	Jonathan Zebina ^{EL}
16	MF	ITA	Mauro Camoranesi ^{EL}
17	FW	FRA	David Trezeguet ^{EL}

No.	Pos.	Nation	Player
18	MF	DEN	Christian Poulsen ^{EL}
19	DF	ITA	Cristian Molinaro
20	MF	ITA	Sebastian Giovinco ^{EL}
21	DF	CZE	Zdeněk Grygera ^{EL}
22	MF	MLI	Mohamed Sissoko ^{EL}
23	DF	ITA	Lorenzo Ariaudo ^{EL B}
26	MF	ITA	Antonio Candreva ^{EL} (on loan from Udinese)
27	FW	ITA	Michele Paolucci ^{EL}
28	MF	BRA	Diego ^{EL}
29	DF	ITA	Paolo De Ceglie ^{EL}
30	MF	POR	Tiago
33	DF	ITA	Nicola Legrottaglie ^{EL}
36	MF	ITA	Manuel Giandonato
39	MF	ITA	Luca Marrone ^{EL B}
40	FW	ITA	Ciro Immobile ^{EL B}

Players in the squad list A and B submitted to UEFA were indicated by ^{EL} and ^{EL B} respectively. Buffon, Molinaro and Tiago were in 2009–10 UEFA Champions League, they were make way for new signing Candreva and Paolucci.

=== Reserve squad ===
As of 5 February 2010

Note: Flags indicate national team as defined under FIFA eligibility rules; some limited exceptions apply. Players may hold more than one non-FIFA nationality.

No.	Pos.	Nation	Player
—	GK	ITA	Marco Bodrito
41	GK	ITA	Carlo Pinsoglio ^{EL B}
—	GK	ITA	Antonio Piccolo
—	DF	ITA	Raffaele Alcibiade
—	DF	CIV	Abdoulaye Bamba
—	DF	ITA	Roberto Crivello
—	DF	ITA	Andrea De Paola
—	DF	ITA	Vittorio Ferrero
—	DF	ITA	Dario Romano
—	DF	ITA	Simone Serino
—	DF	ITA	Tommaso Silvestri
—	MF	ITA	Luca Belcastro
—	MF	ITA	Filippo Boniperti

No.	Pos.	Nation	Player
—	MF	ITA	Riccardo Enrico
35	MF	ITA	Simone Esposito ^{EL B}
32	MF	ESP	Iago Falque
36	MF	ITA	Manuel Giandonato
—	MF	ITA	Giuseppe Giovinco
39	MF	ITA	Luca Marrone ^{EL B}
—	MF	ITA	Domenico Pirrotta
37	MF	ITA	Fausto Rossi ^{EL B}
—	FW	ITA	Walter Carta
—	FW	ITA	Manuel Fischnaller
40	FW	ITA	Ciro Immobile ^{EL B}
—	FW	ITA	Alberto Libertazzi
—	FW	ITA	Giovanni Terrazzino

Players in the squad list B submitted to UEFA were indicated by ^{EL B}.

=== Berretti squad ===
As of 18 September 2009

Note: Flags indicate national team as defined under FIFA eligibility rules; some limited exceptions apply. Players may hold more than one non-FIFA nationality.

No.	Pos.	Nation	Player
45	GK	ITA	Marco Bonassi ^{EL B}
—	GK	ITA	Samuele De Miglio
—	GK	ITA	Mattia Petitti
—	DF	ITA	Nicolò Bainotti
—	DF	ITA	Andrea Calarola
—	DF	ITA	Simone Di Dio
—	DF	CRO	Petar Kostadinović
—	DF	ITA	Roberto Raimondo
—	MF	ITA	Matteo Busco
—	MF	ITA	Fabio Farella

No.	Pos.	Nation	Player
—	MF	ITA	Umberto Germano
—	MF	ITA	Andrea Gramaglia
—	MF	ITA	Luca Marangone
—	MF	ITA	Luca Pramatton
—	MF	ITA	Alex Tuninetti
—	MF	ITA	Vincenzo Visciglia
—	FW	ITA	Stefano Alba
—	FW	ITA	Luca Arena
—	FW	ITA	Fabio Mirimin
—	FW	ITA	Marco Schena

Players in the squad list B submitted to UEFA were indicated by ^{EL B}.

== Transfers ==
=== In ===
#	Pos	Nationality	Player	From	Fee	Date
5	DF	(Italy)	Fabio Cannavaro	Real Madrid	Free	19-05-2009
28	MF	(Brazil)	Diego	Werder Bremen	€24.5 million + €2.5 million (bonus)	26-05-2009
	FW	(Italy)	Michele Paolucci	Siena	Undisclosed (co-ownership resolution)	26-06-2009
24	MF	(Argentina)	Sergio Almirón	Fiorentina	Loan return	01-07-2009
	MF	(Italy)	Raffaele Bianco	Bari	Loan return	01-07-2009
	FW	(Morocco)	Oussama Essabr	Vicenza	Loan return	01-07-2009
31	GK	(Bulgaria)	Mario Kirev	Grasshopper	Loan return	01-07-2009
	FW	(Italy)	Riccardo Maniero	Lumezzane	Loan return	01-07-2009
	MF	(Uruguay)	Rubén Olivera	Genoa	Loan return	01-07-2009
	DF	(Italy)	Andrea Pisani	Pro Patria	Loan return	01-07-2009
	MF	(Cuba)	Samon Reider Rodríguez	Poggibonsi	Loan return	01-07-2009
	MF	(Italy)	Dario Venitucci	Avellino	Loan return	01-07-2009
	GK	(Italy)	Alessandro Vono	Livorno	Loan return	01-07-2009
4	MF	(Brazil)	Felipe Melo	Fiorentina	€25 million	15-07-2009
2	DF	(Uruguay)	Martín Cáceres	Barcelona	Loan (with €11 million permanent option)	06-08-2009
6	DF	(Italy)	Fabio Grosso	Lyon	€2 million + €1 million (bonus)	31-08-2009
	FW	(Italy)	Manuel Fischnaller	Südtirol	Loan (with €800,000 permanent option)	23-12-2009
	MF	(Spain)	Iago Falque	Bari	loan return	14-1-2010
	FW	(Italy)	Michele Paolucci	Siena	joint ownership re-call	16-1-2010
	MF	(Italy)	Antonio Candreva	Udinese	Loan (with €7.5 million joint ownership option)	16-1-2010

=== Out ===
#	Pos	Nationality	Player	To	Fee	Date
11	MF	(Czech Republic)	Pavel Nedvěd	Retired	Free	31-05-2009
14	DF	(Portugal)	Jorge Andrade	Free agent	Mutual contract termination	15-06-2009
15	DF	(Croatia)	Dario Knežević	Livorno	End of loan	15-06-2009
	DF	(Italy)	Domenico Criscito	Genoa	€5.5 million (co-ownership)	24-05-2009
	MF	(Italy)	Matteo Cavagna	Ravenna	Undisclosed (co-ownership resolution)	25-06-2009
	MF	(Italy)	Andrè Cuneaz	Mantova	Renewed co-ownership	25-06-2009
	FW	(Italy)	Raffaele Palladino	Genoa	Renewed co-ownership	25-06-2009
	GK	(Italy)	Andrea Pozzato	Canavese	Renewed co-ownership	25-06-2009
	DF	(Italy)	Lorenzo Del Prete	Siena	Undisclosed (co-ownership resolution)	26-06-2009
	FW	(Paraguay)	Tomás Guzmán	Piacenza	Undisclosed (co-ownership resolution)	26-06-2009
	FW	(Italy)	Davide Lanzafame	Palermo	Renewed co-ownership	25-06-2009
	GK	(Italy)	Antonio Mirante	Sampdoria	Renewed co-ownership	26-06-2009
	FW	(Italy)	Rej Volpato	Bari	Undisclosed (co-ownership resolution)	26-06-2009
	FW	(Italy)	Francesco Volpe	Livorno	Renewed co-ownership	26-06-2009
	FW	(Uruguay)	Marcelo Zalayeta	Napoli	Renewed co-ownership	26-06-2009
	DF	(Italy)	Giuseppe Rizza	Livorno	Undisclosed (co-ownership resolution)	29-06-2009
4	DF	(Sweden)	Olof Mellberg	Olympiacos	€2.5 million + €500,000 (bonus)	01-07-2009
	FW	(Italy)	Michele Paolucci	Siena	Undisclosed (co-ownership)	08-07-2009
32	MF	(Italy)	Marco Marchionni	Fiorentina	€4.5 million	15-07-2009
	GK	(Italy)	Alessandro Vono	Catanzaro	Undisclosed	27-07-2009
6	MF	(Italy)	Cristiano Zanetti	Fiorentina	€2 million	10-08-2009
	MF	(Uruguay)	Rubén Olivera	Peñarol	Free	20-08-2009

=== Loaned out ===
#	Pos	Nationality	Player	To	Duration of the loan
	DF	(Italy)	Andrea Pisani	Cittadella	10-07-2009 / 01-07-2010
	DF	(Italy)	Stefano Di Cuonzo	Pro Patria	10-07-2009 / 01-07-2010
	DF	(Italy)	Stefano Di Berardino	Pistoiese	10-07-2009 / 01-07-2010
	MF	(Italy)	Luca Lagnese	Isola Liri	10-07-2009 / 01-07-2010
27	MF	(Sweden)	Albin Ekdal	Siena	10-07-2009 / 01-07-2010
52	MF	(Italy)	Luca Castiglia	Cesena	10-07-2009 / 01-07-2010
	MF	(Italy)	Raffaele Bianco	Modena	14-07-2009 / 01-07-2010
	MF	(Italy)	Dario Venitucci	Arezzo	14-07-2009 / 01-07-2010
	MF	(Italy)	Christian Pasquato	Empoli	20-08-2009 / 01-07-2010
	MF	(Italy)	Carlo Vecchione	Clermont	17-07-2009 / 01-07-2010
	FW	(Morocco)	Oussama Essabr	Arezzo	28-07-2009 / 01-07-2010
	FW	(Italy)	Riccardo Maniero	Arezzo	10-07-2009 / 01-07-2010
	FW	(Somalia)	Ayub Daud	Crotone	07-08-2009 / 01-07-2010
	DF	(Italy)	Salvatore D'Elia	Figline	20-08-2009 / 01-07-2010
	DF	(Italy)	Marco Duravia	Figline	20-08-2009 / 01-07-2010
	MF	(Italy)	Nicola Cosentini	Figline	20-08-2009 / 01-07-2010
	FW	(Italy)	Alessandro D'Antoni	Figline	20-08-2009 / 01-07-2010
	MF	(Argentina)	Sergio Almirón	Bari	20-08-2009 / 01-07-2010
	DF	(Italy)	Lorenzo Ariaudo	Cagliari	01-03-2010 / 01-07-2010
	DF	(Italy)	Cristian Molinaro	VfB Stuttgart	01-07-2010 / 01-07-2010
	MF	(Cuba)	Samon Reider Rodríguez	Alessandria	22-07-2010 / 01-07-2010
	MF	(Portugal)	Tiago	Atlético Madrid	07-01-2010 / 01-07-2010
	MF	(Italy)	Christian Pasquato	Triestina	15-01-2010 / 01-07-2010
	GK	(Bulgaria)	Mario Kirev	Thun	01-03-2010 / 01-07-2010

=== Financial Summary ===
This section displays the club's financial expenditure's in the transfer market. Because all transfer fee's are not disclosed to the public, the numbers displayed in this section are only based on figures released by media outlets.

==== Spending ====
Summer: ▼€52,500,000

Winter: ▲€0,000,000

Total: ▼€52,500,000

==== Income ====
Summer: ▲€14,500,000

Winter: ▲€0,000,000

Total: ▲€14,500,000

==== Expenditure ====
Summer: ▼€38,000,000

Winter: ▲€0,000,000

Total: ▼€38,000,000

== Pre-season and friendlies ==
=== Friendly matches ===
15 July 2009	Juventus	4–1	Cisco Roma	Pinzolo
17:30 CEST	Trezeguet 9'; Zanetti 64'; Amauri 67'; Immobile 84'		Franchini 26'	Referee: Giorgio Peretti (Italy)

19 July 2009	Nancy	1–1	Juventus	Jœuf
18:00 CEST	Ouaddou 45'		Amauri 8'	Attendance: 9,000; Referee: Philippe Kalt (France)

21 July 2009	Juventus	1–1	Vicenza	Trento
17:00 CEST	Amauri (red card) 18'; Trezeguet 76' (pen.)		Misuraca 16'	Attendance: 4,500; Referee: Sebastiano Peruzzo (Italy)

1 August 2009	Juventus	7–1	West Auckland Town	Trento
17:00 CEST	Esposito 5', 36'; Serino 15'; Almirón 25'; G. Giovinco 27', 44'; Boniperti 64'		Hutchinson 75'

7 August 2009	Juventus	1–4	Villarreal	Salerno
20:45 CEST	Molinaro (yellow card) 58'; Marchisio (yellow card) 64'; Amauri 84'		Eguren (yellow card) 20'; Cazorla 42'; Nilmar 51'; Pires 77', 90'	Stadium: Stadio Arechi; Referee: Antonio Damato (Italy)

11 August 2009	Juventus	3–1	Juventus' Reserves	Villar Perosa
17:30 CEST	Trezeguet 18'; Amauri 51'; De Paola 72'		Esposito 2'

14 August 2009 TIM Trophy	Internazionale	1–1 (5–6 p)	Juventus	Pescara
20:30 CEST	Motta 25'; Stanković (yellow card) 27'; Materazzi (red card) 39'		Melo (yellow card) 27'; Iaquinta (penalty missed) 41'; Amauri 43'	Stadium: Stadio Adriatico; Referee: Antonio Damato
	Penalties
	Milito (penalty scored); Balotelli (penalty scored); Chivu (penalty scored); Motta (penalty scored); Samuel (penalty missed); Vieira (penalty scored); Santon (penalty missed)		(penalty scored) Salihamidžić; (penalty scored) Grygera; (penalty scored) Melo; (penalty missed) Poulsen; (penalty scored) Amauri; (penalty scored) Iaquinta; (penalty scored) Legrottaglie

14 August 2009 TIM Trophy	AC Milan	0–2	Juventus	Pescara
23:00 CEST			Amauri 13'; Iaquinta 31'; Legrottaglie (yellow card) 40'	Stadium: Stadio Adriatico; Referee: Carmine Russo

17 August 2009 Trofeo Luigi Berlusconi	AC Milan	1–1 (5–4 p)	Juventus	Milan
20:45 CEST	Pato 68'		Legrottaglie (yellow card) 3'; Diego 27'	Stadium: San Siro; Referee: Nicola Rizzoli
	Penalties
	Pirlo (penalty scored); Ronaldinho (penalty scored); Borriello (penalty scored); Inzaghi (penalty scored); Silva (penalty scored)		(penalty missed) Falque; (penalty scored) Trezeguet; (penalty scored) Melo; (penalty scored) Marchisio; (penalty scored) Amauri

=== Peace Cup ===
==== Group stage ====
24 July 2009 1	Sevilla	1–2	Juventus	Seville
22:30 CEST	Squillaci 80'		Amauri 26'; Iaquinta 65'	Stadium: Estadio Olímpico de Sevilla; Attendance: 15,000; Referee: Stephan Johannesson (Sweden)

28 July 2009 2	Juventus	3–0	Seongnam Ilhwa Chunma	Jerez
22:30 CEST	Iaquinta 40'; Diego 53'; Legrottaglie 70'			Stadium: Estadio Municipal de Chapín; Attendance: 1,000; Referee: Manuel Mejuto González (Spain)

==== Knockout phase ====
31 July 2009 Semi-finals	Juventus	2–1	Real Madrid	Seville
22:30 CEST	Cannavaro 3'; Salihamidžić 49'		Ronaldo 41' (pen.)	Stadium: Ramón Sánchez Pizjuán Stadium; Referee: (Sweden) Stephan Johannesson (Israel) Alon Yefet

2 August 2009 Final	Aston Villa	0–0 (a.e.t.) (4–3 p)	Juventus	Seville
22:00 CEST				Stadium: Estadio Olímpico de Sevilla; Referee: Kevin Blom (Netherlands)
	Penalties
	Bannan (penalty scored); Sidwell (penalty missed); Lowry (penalty scored); Young (penalty scored); Herd (penalty missed); Cuéllar (penalty scored)		(penalty missed) Iaquinta; (penalty scored) Trezeguet; (penalty scored) Amauri; (penalty scored) Melo; (penalty missed) Del Piero; (penalty missed) Legrottaglie

== Competitions ==
=== Serie A ===
==== League table ====
Pos	Team	Pld	W	D	L	GF	GA	GD	Pts	Qualification or relegation
5	Palermo	38	18	11	9	59	47	+12	65	Qualification to Europa League play-off round
6	Napoli	38	15	14	9	50	43	+7	59	Qualification to Europa League play-off round
7	Juventus	38	16	7	15	55	56	−1	55	Qualification to Europa League third qualifying round
8	Parma	38	14	10	14	46	51	−5	52	
9	Genoa	38	14	9	15	57	61	−4	51	

Source: Lega Calcio and Yahoo! Sport
Rules for classification: 1) points; 2) head-to-head points; 3) head-to-head goal difference; 4) head-to-head goals scored; 5) goal difference; 6) number of goals scored.

==== Results summary ====
Overall								Home						Away					
Pld	W	D	L	GF	GA	GD	Pts	W	D	L	GF	GA	GD	W	D	L	GF	GA	GD
38	16	7	15	55	56	−1	55	9	4	6	32	26	+6	7	3	9	23	30	−7

Last updated: 16 May 2010.
Source: Competitive matches

==== Results by round ====
Round	1	2	3	4	5	6	7	8	9	10	11	12	13	14	15	16	17	18	19	20	21	22	23	24	25	26	27	28	29	30	31	32	33	34	35	36	37	38
Ground	H	A	A	H	A	H	A	H	A	H	H	A	H	A	H	A	H	A	H	A	H	H	A	H	A	H	A	H	A	A	H	A	H	A	H	A	H	A
Result	W	W	W	W	D	D	L	D	W	W	L	W	W	L	W	L	L	W	L	L	L	D	D	W	W	L	W	D	L	L	W	L	W	L	W	D	L	L
Position	5	2	2	2	2	2	3	3	3	2	2	2	2	3	3	3	3	3	3	5	6	5	7	6	4	5	5	5	6	7	6	7	6	7	6	7	7	7

Updated to match(es) played on 16 May 2010. Source: Competitive matches
A = Away; H = Home; W = Win; D = Draw; L = Loss

==== Matches ====
23 August 2009 1	Juventus	1–0	Chievo	Turin
20:45 CEST (UTC+02:00)	Iaquinta 11'; Poulsen (yellow card) 14'; Cannavaro (yellow card) 72'; Marrone (yellow card) 78'	Report	Rigoni (yellow card) 11'; Pinzi (yellow card) 14'	Stadium: Stadio Olimpico di Torino; Attendance: 23,523; Referee: Gabriele Gava

30 August 2009 2	Roma	1–3	Juventus	Rome
18:00 CEST (UTC+02:00)	De Rossi (yellow card) 20', (goal) 35'; Taddei (yellow card) 34'; Perrotta (yellow card) 37'	Report	Tiago (yellow card) 16'; Diego 25', 68', (yellow card) 36'; Marchisio (yellow card) 44'; Grygera (yellow card) 80'; Melo 90+3'	Stadium: Stadio Olimpico; Attendance: 57,500; Referee: Gianluca Rocchi

12 September 2009 3	Lazio	0–2	Juventus	Rome
20:45 CEST (UTC+02:00)		Report	Legrottaglie (yellow card) 30'; Melo (yellow card) 54'; Cáceres (yellow card) 59', (goal) 72'; Amauri (yellow card) 88'; Trezeguet 90+4'	Stadium: Stadio Olimpico; Attendance: 55,000; Referee: Andrea Gervasoni

19 September 2009 4	Juventus	2–0	Livorno	Turin
20:45 CEST (UTC+02:00)	Iaquinta 8'; Marchisio 30'	Report	Moro (yellow card) 45+1'; Lucarelli (yellow card) 45+2'	Stadium: Stadio Olimpico di Torino; Attendance: 22,788; Referee: Nicola Pierpaoli

24 September 2009 5	Genoa	2–2	Juventus	Genoa
20:45 CEST (UTC+02:00)	Mesto 31'; Bocchetti (yellow card) 57'; Crespo 75'; M. Rossi (yellow card) 90+4'	Report	Iaquinta 6', (yellow card) 84'; Melo (yellow card) 81'; Trezeguet 86'	Stadium: Stadio Luigi Ferraris; Attendance: 31,882; Referee: Massimiliano Saccani

27 September 2009 6	Juventus	1–1	Bologna	Turin
15:00 CEST (UTC+02:00)	Trezeguet 25'; Giovinco (yellow card) 87'	Report	Viviano (yellow card) 68'; Raggi (yellow card) 85'; Adaílton 90+3'	Stadium: Stadio Olimpico di Torino; Attendance: 24,456; Referee: Carmine Russo

4 October 2009 7	Palermo	2–0	Juventus	Palermo
20:45 CEST (UTC+02:00)	Cavani 37'; Simplício 42'; Cassani (yellow card) 70'; Pastore (yellow card) 82'	Report	Camoranesi (yellow card) 34'; Legrottaglie (yellow card) 45+2'; Zebina (yellow card) 71'; Grygera (yellow card) 90+1'	Stadium: Stadio Renzo Barbera; Attendance: 31,606; Referee: Daniele Orsato

17 October 2009 8	Juventus	1–1	Fiorentina	Turin
18:00 CEST (UTC+02:00)	Sissoko (yellow card) 2'; Amauri 19'; Grygera (yellow card) 38'	Report	Vargas 5'; Montolivo (yellow card) 33'; Gobbi (yellow card) 58'	Stadium: Stadio Olimpico di Torino; Attendance: 25,779; Referee: Nicola Rizzoli

25 October 2009 9	Siena	0–1	Juventus	Siena
15:00 CET (UTC+01:00)	Codrea (yellow card) 71'	Report	Legrottaglie (yellow card) 37'; Amauri 72'; Camoranesi (yellow card) 84'	Stadium: Stadio Artemio Franchi – Montepaschi Arena; Attendance: 15,367; Referee: Paolo Tagliavento

28 October 2009 10	Juventus	5–1	Sampdoria	Turin
20:45 CET (UTC+01:00)	Sissoko (yellow card) 19'; Amauri 26', 62'; Chiellini 42'; Camoranesi 50'; Trezeguet 88'	Report	Gastaldello (yellow card) 30'; Pazzini 63'	Stadium: Stadio Olimpico di Torino; Attendance: 25,273; Referee: Gianluca Rocchi

31 October 2009 11	Juventus	2–3	Napoli	Turin
18:00 CET (UTC+01:00)	Trezeguet 35'; Giovinco 54'; Chiellini (yellow card) 88'; Amauri (red card) 90+3'	Report	Contini (yellow card) 45'; Campagnaro (yellow card) 57'; Hamšík 59', 81'; Dátolo 64'; P. Cannavaro (yellow card) 74'	Stadium: Stadio Olimpico di Torino; Attendance: 22,899; Referee: Antonio Damato

8 November 2009 12	Atalanta	2–5	Juventus	Bergamo
20:45 CET (UTC+01:00)	Padoin (yellow card) 16'; Doni (yellow card) 43'; Valdés 51'; Guarente (yellow card) 51'; Ceravolo 71'; Bellini (yellow card) 79'	Report	Grosso (yellow card) 18'; Camoranesi 36', 37'; Melo 55'; Poulsen (yellow card) 58'; Cannavaro (yellow card) 77'; Diego 84'; Trezeguet 87', (yellow card) 88'	Stadium: Stadio Atleti Azzurri d'Italia; Attendance: 20,764; Referee: Emidio Morganti

22 November 2009 13	Juventus	1–0	Udinese	Turin
20:45 CET (UTC+01:00)	Diego (yellow card) 45+1'; Grosso 51'; Del Piero (yellow card) 88'; Poulsen (yellow card) 89'	Report	Asamoah (yellow card) 36'; Handanović (yellow card) 45+3'	Stadium: Stadio Olimpico di Torino; Attendance: 23,609; Referee: Christian Brighi

29 November 2009 14	Cagliari	2–0	Juventus	Cagliari
15:00 CET (UTC+01:00)	Nenê 31'; Jeda (yellow card) 43'; Cossu (yellow card) 70'; López (yellow card) 85'; Matri 89'	Report	Sissoko (yellow card) 18'; Camoranesi (yellow card) 53'; Amauri (yellow card) 71'	Stadium: Stadio Sant'Elia; Attendance: 23,000; Referee: Andrea De Marco

6 December 2009 15	Juventus	2–1	Internazionale	Turin
20:45 CET (UTC+01:00)	Chiellini 20'; Marchisio 58'; Grosso (yellow card) 60'; Amauri (yellow card) 80'; Melo (yellow card) 25' (yellow-red card) 87'; Cáceres (yellow card) 90+3'	Report	Muntari (yellow card) 23'; Eto'o 26'; Samuel (yellow card) 27'; Balotelli (yellow card) 87'	Stadium: Stadio Olimpico di Torino; Attendance: 25,530; Referee: Massimiliano Saccani

13 December 2009 16	Bari	3–1	Juventus	Bari
20:45 CET (UTC+01:00)	Meggiorini 7', (yellow card) 8'; Barreto 44' (pen.); Almirón (yellow card) 67', (goal) 81'	Report	Tiago (yellow card) 22'; Trezeguet 23'; Cannavaro (yellow card) 43'; Poulsen (yellow card) 72'	Stadium: Stadio San Nicola; Attendance: 51,849; Referee: Paolo Tagliavento

20 December 2009 17	Juventus	1–2	Catania	Turin
15:00 CET (UTC+01:00)	Tiago (yellow card) 22'; Diego (yellow card) 45'; Cannavaro (yellow card) 54'; Marchisio (yellow card) 63'; Salihamidžić 66'	Report	Martínez 23' (pen.); Morimoto (yellow card) 42'; Izco 87'	Stadium: Stadio Olimpico di Torino; Attendance: 21,327; Referee: Nicola Pierpaoli

6 January 2010 18	Parma	1–2	Juventus	Parma
15:00 CET (UTC+01:00)	Amoruso 25'; Morrone (yellow card) 76'; Dellafiore (yellow card) 90+4'	Report	Salihamidžić 3'; Castellini 39' (o.g.); Marchisio (yellow card) 47'; Melo (yellow card) 62'; Grosso (yellow card) 69'; Cáceres (yellow card) 32' (yellow-red card) 74'	Stadium: Stadio Ennio Tardini; Attendance: 20,530; Referee: Nicola Rizzoli

10 January 2010 19	Juventus	0–3	AC Milan	Turin
20:45 CET (UTC+01:00)	Poulsen (yellow card) 31'; Amauri (yellow card) 80'	Report	Nesta 29'; Ronaldinho 71', 87'; Ambrosini (yellow card) 73'	Stadium: Stadio Olimpico di Torino; Attendance: 24,165; Referee: Antonio Damato

17 January 2010 20	Chievo	1–0	Juventus	Verona
15:00 CET (UTC+01:00)	Sardo 33'; Granoche (yellow card) 60'; Yepes (yellow card) 64'; Ariatti (yellow card) 90+2'	Report	Zebina (yellow card) 70'; Melo (yellow card) 74'	Stadium: Stadio Marc'Antonio Bentegodi; Attendance: 21,132; Referee: Paolo Valeri

24 January 2010 21	Juventus	1–2	Roma	Turin
20:45 CET (UTC+01:00)	Del Piero 51'; Grosso (yellow card) 67'; Buffon (red card) 83'; Salihamidžić (yellow card) 86'	Report	De Rossi (yellow card) 60'; Burdisso (yellow card) 61'; Totti 68' (pen.); Taddei (yellow card) 71'; Riise 90+3'	Stadium: Stadio Olimpico di Torino; Attendance: 18,750; Referee: Paolo Tagliavento

31 January 2010 22	Juventus	1–1	Lazio	Turin
20:45 CET (UTC+01:00)	Sissoko (yellow card) 49'; Del Piero 70' (pen.); Grygera (yellow card) 90+1'	Report	Baronio (yellow card) 24'; Diakité (yellow card) 69'; Mauri 78'	Stadium: Stadio Olimpico di Torino; Attendance: 20,899; Referee: Massimiliano Saccani

7 February 2010 23	Livorno	1–1	Juventus	Livorno
20:45 CET (UTC+01:00)	Filippini 26'; Mozart (yellow card) 27'; Perticone (yellow card) 75'; Lucarelli (yellow card) 90+2'	Report	Legrottaglie 42'; Cannavaro (yellow card) 47'; Melo (yellow card) 21' (yellow-red card) 82'	Stadium: Stadio Armando Picchi; Attendance: 14,867; Referee: Christian Brighi

14 February 2010 24	Juventus	3–2	Genoa	Turin
15:00 CET (UTC+01:00)	Candreva (yellow card) 37'; Amauri 42', (yellow card) 43'; Zebina (yellow card) 51'; Del Piero 61', 78' (pen.); Salihamidžić (yellow card) 90+3'	Report	Rossi 16', 63', (yellow card) 27'; Bocchetti (yellow card) 19'; Acquafresca (yellow card) 37'; Papastathopoulos (yellow card) 84'	Stadium: Stadio Olimpico di Torino; Attendance: 22,252; Referee: Paolo Mazzoleni

21 February 2010 25	Bologna	1–2	Juventus	Bologna
15:00 CET (UTC+01:00)	Buscè 50'; Raggi (red card) 90+2'; Portanova (yellow card) 90+6'	Report	Diego 4'; Marchisio (yellow card) 53'; Candreva 66'	Stadium: Stadio Renato Dall'Ara; Attendance: 25,759; Referee: Luca Banti

28 February 2010 26	Juventus	0–2	Palermo	Turin
20:45 CET (UTC+01:00)	Candreva (yellow card) 6'; Sissoko (yellow card) 75'	Report	Miccoli 60'; Cassani (yellow card) 66'; Budan 81'	Stadium: Stadio Olimpico di Torino; Attendance: 20,749; Referee: Paolo Valeri

7 March 2010 27	Fiorentina	1–2	Juventus	Florence
18:00 CET (UTC+01:00)	Marchionni 32'	Report	Diego 2'; Sissoko (yellow card) 41'; Zebina (yellow card) 58'; Grosso 68'; Marchisio (yellow card) 88'	Stadium: Stadio Artemio Franchi; Attendance: 34,805; Referee: Antonio Damato

14 March 2010 28	Juventus	3–3	Siena	Turin
15:00 CET (UTC+01:00)	Del Piero 2', 7'; Candreva 10'; Salihamidžić (yellow card) 65'; Sissoko (yellow card) 69'	Report	Maccarone 16'; Pratali (yellow card) 40'; Ghezzal 46', 74' (pen.); Del Grosso (yellow card) 48'; Reginaldo (yellow card) 77'; Tziolis (yellow card) 86'	Stadium: Stadio Olimpico di Torino; Attendance: 22,804; Referee: Carmine Russo

21 March 2010 29	Sampdoria	1–0	Juventus	Genoa
20:45 CET (UTC+01:00)	Lucchini (yellow card) 26'; Pazzini (yellow card) 48'; Cassano 76'; Storari (yellow card) 90+2'	Report	Marchisio (yellow card) 53'; Legrottaglie (yellow card) 74'	Stadium: Stadio Luigi Ferraris; Attendance: 27,398; Referee: Paolo Tagliavento

25 March 2010 30	Napoli	3–1	Juventus	Naples
20:45 CET (UTC+01:00)	Grava (yellow card) 12'; Hamšík 51'; Quagliarella 72'; Lavezzi 88', (yellow card) 90+2'	Report	Chiellini 7'; Del Piero (yellow card) 19'; Camoranesi (yellow card) 24'; Zebina (yellow card) 49'	Stadium: Stadio San Paolo; Attendance: 52,249; Referee: Nicola Rizzoli

28 March 2010 31	Juventus	2–1	Atalanta	Turin
15:00 CEST (UTC+02:00)	Del Piero 30'; Zebina (yellow card) 40'; Melo 82'; Giovinco (yellow card) 90+4'	Report	De Ascentis (yellow card) 29'; Amoruso 45+1'; Peluso (yellow card) 62'	Stadium: Stadio Olimpico di Torino; Attendance: 20,310; Referee: Andrea Gervasoni

3 April 2010 32	Udinese	3–0	Juventus	Udine
21:00 CEST (UTC+02:00)	Sánchez 9', (yellow card) 11'; Ferronetti (yellow card) 18'; Luković (yellow card) 29'; Pasquale (yellow card) 61'; Pepe 65'; Di Natale 76'	Report	Melo (yellow card) 20'; Del Piero (yellow card) 58'	Stadium: Stadio Friuli; Attendance: 22,390; Referee: Gianluca Rocchi

11 April 2010 33	Juventus	1–0	Cagliari	Turin
15:00 CEST (UTC+02:00)	Chiellini 35', (yellow card) 51'; Marchisio (yellow card) 45'; Melo (yellow card) 50'; Grosso (yellow card) 66'	Report	Conti (yellow card) 34'; Canini (yellow card) 88'	Stadium: Stadio Olimpico di Torino; Attendance: 22,634; Referee: Paolo Valeri

18 April 2010 34	Internazionale	2–0	Juventus	Milan
20:45 CEST (UTC+02:00)	Samuel (yellow card) 18'; Motta (yellow card) 21'; Maicon 75'; Eto'o 90+2', (yellow card) 90+5'; Balotelli (yellow card) 90+6'	Report	Melo (yellow card) 20'; Sissoko (yellow card) 21' (yellow-red card) 37'; Chiellini (yellow card) 76'	Stadium: San Siro; Attendance: 46,164; Referee: Antonio Damato

25 April 2010 35	Juventus	3–0	Bari	Turin
15:00 CEST (UTC+02:00)	Camoranesi (yellow card) 37'; Iaquinta 53', 86', (yellow card) 54'; Del Piero 69' (pen.)	Report	Almirón (yellow card) 30'; Meggiorini (yellow card) 61'; Gillet (yellow card) 69'	Stadium: Stadio Olimpico di Torino; Attendance: 24,147; Referee: Andrea Gervasoni

2 May 2010 36	Catania	1–1	Juventus	Catania
15:00 CEST (UTC+02:00)	Silvestre 24'; Mascara (yellow card) 79'	Report	De Ceglie (yellow card) 23'; Zebina (yellow card) 38'; Cannavaro (yellow card) 45'; Marchisio 52'; Salihamidžić (yellow card) 84'; Melo (yellow card) 90+1'	Stadium: Stadio Angelo Massimino; Attendance: 18,582; Referee: Daniele Orsato

9 May 2010 37	Juventus	2–3	Parma	Turin
15:00 CEST (UTC+02:00)	Del Piero 16'; De Ceglie (yellow card) 80'; Iaquinta 90+3'	Report	Lanzafame 20', 40'; Galloppa (yellow card) 28'; Biabiany 85'	Stadium: Stadio Olimpico di Torino; Attendance: 23,666; Referee: Andrea Romeo

16 May 2010 38	AC Milan	3–0	Juventus	Milan
20:45 CEST (UTC+02:00)	Antonini 14'; Gattuso (yellow card) 21'; Ronaldinho 28', 67', (yellow card) 70'	Report	Cannavaro (yellow card) 36'; Grosso (yellow card) 51'	Stadium: San Siro; Attendance: 66,108; Referee: Matteo Trefoloni

=== Coppa Italia ===
13 January 2010 Round of 16	Juventus	3–0	Napoli	Turin
20:45 CET (UTC+01:00)	Diego 24'; Salihamidžić (yellow card) 26'; De Ceglie (yellow card) 42'; Del Piero 77', 83' (pen.)	Report	Cigarini (yellow card) 49'; Contini (yellow card) 24' (yellow-red card) 82'	Stadium: Stadio Olimpico di Torino; Attendance: 10,112; Referee: Andrea Romeo

28 January 2010 Quarter-finals	Internazionale	2–1	Juventus	Milan
20:45 CET (UTC+01:00)	Maicon (yellow card) 49'; Lúcio 72'; Balotelli 89'	Report	Diego 10'; Chiellini (yellow card) 50'; Melo (yellow card) 70'; Cannavaro (yellow card) 75'	Stadium: San Siro; Attendance: 20,783; Referee: Antonio Damato

=== UEFA Champions League ===
==== Group stage ====
Pos	Team	Pld	W	D	L	GF	GA	GD	Pts	Qualification
1	(France) Bordeaux	6	5	1	0	9	2	+7	16	Advance to knockout phase
2	(Germany) Bayern Munich	6	3	1	2	9	5	+4	10	Advance to knockout phase
3	(Italy) Juventus	6	2	2	2	4	7	−3	8	Transfer to Europa League
4	(Israel) Maccabi Haifa	6	0	0	6	0	8	−8	0	

Source: RSSSF

15 September 2009 1	Juventus (Italy)	1–1	(France) Bordeaux	Turin, Italy
20:45 CEST (UTC+02:00)	Iaquinta 63', (yellow card) 63'; Giovinco (yellow card) 68'	Report	Ciani (yellow card) 65'; Plašil 75'	Stadium: Stadio Olimpico di Torino; Attendance: 17,513; Referee: Tom Henning Øvrebø (Norway)

30 September 2009 2	Bayern Munich (Germany)	0–0	(Italy) Juventus	Munich, Germany
20:45 CEST (UTC+02:00)		Report	Trezeguet (yellow card) 8'; Camoranesi (yellow card) 37'; Marchisio (yellow card) 57'	Stadium: Allianz Arena; Attendance: 66,000; Referee: Howard Webb (England)

21 October 2009 3	Juventus (Italy)	1–0	(Israel) Maccabi Haifa	Turin, Italy
20:45 CEST (UTC+02:00)	Chiellini 47'	Report	Culma (yellow card) 11'; Teixeira (yellow card) 31'; Osman (yellow card) 38'; Zaguri (yellow card) 51'; Dutra (red card) 68'; Boccoli (yellow card) 90'	Stadium: Stadio Olimpico di Torino; Attendance: 21,303; Referee: Olegário Benquerença (Portugal)

3 November 2009 4	Maccabi Haifa (Israel)	0–1	(Italy) Juventus	Ramat Gan, Israel
20:45 CET (UTC+01:00)	Masilela (yellow card) 26'; Culma (yellow card) 36'; Osman (yellow card) 71'	Report	Melo (yellow card) 36'; Camoranesi 45+2'	Stadium: Ramat Gan Stadium; Attendance: 39,120; Referee: Terje Hauge (Norway)
Note: Maccabi Haifa played group matches at the Ramat Gan Stadium in Ramat Gan as their Kiryat Eliezer Stadium did not meet UEFA criteria.

25 November 2009 5	Bordeaux (France)	2–0	(Italy) Juventus	Bordeaux, France
20:45 CET (UTC+01:00)	Cavenaghi 54', (yellow card) 60'; Traoré (yellow card) 90'; Chamakh 90+4'	Report	Camoranesi (yellow card) 33'; Melo (yellow card) 45'; Legrottaglie (yellow card) 51'; Cáceres (yellow card) 58'	Stadium: Stade Chaban-Delmas; Attendance: 32,195; Referee: Eduardo Iturralde González (Spain)

8 December 2009 6	Juventus (Italy)	1–4	(Germany) Bayern Munich	Turin, Italy
20:45 CET (UTC+01:00)	Trezeguet 19'	Report	Pranjić (yellow card) 7'; Butt 30' (pen.); Olić 52'; Schweinsteiger (yellow card) 58'; Demichelis (yellow card) 71'; Gómez 83'; Tymoshchuk 90+2'	Stadium: Stadio Olimpico di Torino; Attendance: 27,801; Referee: Massimo Busacca (Switzerland)

=== UEFA Europa League ===
==== Knockout phase ====
===== Round of 32 =====
18 February 2010 First leg	Ajax (Netherlands)	1–2	(Italy) Juventus	Amsterdam, Netherlands
19:00 CET (UTC+01:00)	Sulejmani 16', (yellow card) 30'; Oleguer (yellow card) 45+1'; Suárez (yellow card) 61'	Report	Legrottaglie (yellow card) 29'; Amauri 31', 58'; Marchisio (yellow card) 42'; Diego (yellow card) 51'; Salihamidžić (red card) 90+2'	Stadium: Amsterdam Arena; Attendance: 51,676; Referee: Ivan Bebek (Croatia)

25 February 2010 Second leg	Juventus (Italy)	0–0 (2–1 agg.)	(Netherlands) Ajax	Turin, Italy
21:05 CET (UTC+01:00)	Melo (yellow card) 62'	Report	Enoh (yellow card) 70'; Eriksen (yellow card) 85'; Vertonghen (yellow card) 86'	Stadium: Stadio Olimpico di Torino; Attendance: 16,441; Referee: Laurent Duhamel (France)

===== Round of 16 =====
11 March 2010 First leg	Juventus (Italy)	3–1	(England) Fulham	Turin, Italy
21:05 CET (UTC+01:00)	Legrottaglie 9', (yellow card) 67'; Zebina 25'; Trezeguet 45+3'	Report	Etuhu 36'; Greening (yellow card) 84'	Stadium: Stadio Olimpico di Torino; Attendance: 11,406; Referee: Florian Meyer (Germany)

19 March 2010 Second leg	Fulham (England)	4–1 (5–4 agg.)	(Italy) Juventus	London, England
19:00 CET (UTC+01:00)	Zamora 9'; Gera 39', 49' (pen.); Dempsey 82'; Konchesky (yellow card) 90'	Report	Trezeguet 2'; Camoranesi (yellow card) 12'; Cannavaro (red card) 26'; Diego (yellow card) 48'; Zebina (red card) 90+1'; Melo (yellow card) 90+2'	Stadium: Craven Cottage; Attendance: 23,458; Referee: Björn Kuipers (Netherlands)

== Statistics ==
=== Overall ===
Games played	50
Games won	21
Games drawn	10
Games lost	19
Goals scored	69
Goals conceded	71
Goal difference	–2
Total yellow cards	112
Total red cards	9
Best result	Juventus 5-1 Sampdoria (H); Serie A, 28 October 2009
Worst result	Juventus 1–4 Bayern Munich (H); Champions League, 8 December 2009
Most appearances (Top three)	Diego (44); Amauri, Giorgio Chiellini and Felipe Melo (40); Fabio Grosso (36)
Top scorer (Top three)	Alessandro Del Piero (11); David Trezeguet (10); Diego, Amauri and Vincenzo Iaquinta (7)
Serie A Points	55/114 (16W/7D/15L)

Last updated: 15 May 2010
Source: Squad stats and Start formations.
Only competitive matches.
Using the most used start formation.
Ordered by position on pitch (from back right to front left).

Games include Champions League/Europa League and Coppa Italia matches unless otherwise noted

=== Appearances and goals ===
As of 19 May 2010

No.	Pos	Nat	Player	Total		Serie A		Europe^{1}		Coppa Italia	
No.	Pos	Nat	Player	Apps	Goals	Apps	Goals	Apps	Goals	Apps	Goals
1	GK	(Italy) ITA	Gianluigi Buffon	35	-43	27	-33	7	-8	1	-2
6	DF	(Italy) ITA	Fabio Grosso	35	2	22+4	2	7	0	2	0
3	DF	(Italy) ITA	Giorgio Chiellini	40	5	32	4	6	1	2	0
5	DF	(Italy) ITA	Fabio Cannavaro	32	0	27	0	4	0	1	0
33	DF	(Italy) ITA	Nicola Legrottaglie	28	2	18+1	1	8	1	1	0
8	MF	(Italy) ITA	Claudio Marchisio	35	3	27+1	3	6+1	0	0	0
28	MF	(Brazil) BRA	Diego	44	7	31+2	5	2	2	9	0
18	MF	(Denmark) DEN	Christian Poulsen	31	0	19+6	0	2+4	0	0	0
4	MF	(Brazil) BRA	Felipe Melo	39	3	28+1	3	8	0	2	0
11	FW	(Brazil) BRA	Amauri	40	7	24+6	5	5+3	2	2	0
10	FW	(Italy) ITA	Alessandro Del Piero	28	11	18+5	9	4	0	1	2
13	GK	(Austria) AUT	Alex Manninger	14	-20	9+2	-19	2	-1	1	0
21	DF	(Czech Republic) CZE	Zdeněk Grygera	24	0	15+4	0	2+1	0	1+1	0
29	DF	(Italy) ITA	Paolo De Ceglie	30	0	14+11	0	2+1	0	2	0
16	MF	(Argentina) ARG	Mauro Camoranesi	32	4	14+10	3	5+3	1	0	0
22	MF	(Mali) MLI	Mohamed Sissoko	23	0	14+3	0	4+1	0	1	0
17	FW	(France) FRA	David Trezeguet	26	8	13+6	7	4+3	1	0	0
15	DF	(France) FRA	Jonathan Zebina	21	1	13+3	0	3+1	1	0+1	0
9	FW	(Italy) ITA	Vincenzo Iaquinta	18	7	12+3	6	2+1	1	0	0
2	DF	(Uruguay) URU	Martín Cáceres	20	1	11+4	1	4+1	0	0	0
26	MF	(Italy) ITA	Antonio Candreva	20	2	8+8	2	2+1	0	1	0
7	MF	(Bosnia and Herzegovina) BIH	Hasan Salihamidžić	17	2	6+8	2	1+1	0	1	0
20	MF	(Italy) ITA	Sebastian Giovinco	18	1	5+10	1	2+1	0	0	0
30	MF	(Portugal) POR	Tiago	10	0	4+3	0	2+1	0	0	0
19	DF	(Italy) ITA	Cristian Molinaro	5	0	4+1	0	0	0	0	0
12	GK	(Italy) ITA	Antonio Chimenti	3	-8	2	-4	1	-4	0	0
27	FW	(Italy) ITA	Michele Paolucci	4	0	1+3	0	0	0	0	0
39	MF	(Italy) ITA	Luca Marrone	2	0	0+2	0	0	0	0	0
40	FW	(Italy) ITA	Ciro Immobile	2	0	0+2	0	0	0	0	0
36	MF	(Italy) ITA	Manuel Giandonato	1	0	0+1	0	0	0	0	0
23	DF	(Italy) ITA	Lorenzo Ariaudo	0	0	0	0	0	0	0	0
31	GK	(Bulgaria) BUL	Mario Kirev	0	0	0	0	0	0	0	0

^{1} Includes Champions League and Europa League

=== Goalscorers ===
Rank	Number	Pos.	Nat.	Player	Serie A	Champions League	Europa League	Coppa Italia	Total
1	10	FW	(Italy)	Alessandro Del Piero	9	0	0	2	11
2	17	FW	(France)	David Trezeguet	7	1	2	0	10
3	9	FW	(Italy)	Vincenzo Iaquinta	6	1	0	0	7
3	11	FW	(Brazil)	Amauri	5	0	2	0	7
3	28	MF	(Brazil)	Diego	5	0	0	2	7
6	3	DF	(Italy)	Giorgio Chiellini	4	1	0	0	5
7	16	MF	(Italy)	Mauro Camoranesi	3	1	0	0	4
8	4	MF	(Brazil)	Felipe Melo	3	0	0	0	3
8	8	MF	(Italy)	Claudio Marchisio	3	0	0	0	3
10	6	DF	(Italy)	Fabio Grosso	2	0	0	0	2
10	7	MF	(Bosnia and Herzegovina)	Hasan Salihamidžić	2	0	0	0	2
10	26	MF	(Italy)	Antonio Candreva	2	0	0	0	2
10	33	DF	(Italy)	Nicola Legrottaglie	1	0	1	0	2
14	2	DF	(Uruguay)	Martín Cáceres	1	0	0	0	1
14	15	DF	(France)	Jonathan Zebina	0	0	1	0	1
14	20	FW	(Italy)	Sebastian Giovinco	1	0	0	0	1
Own goals for					1	0	0	0	1
TOTALS					55	4	6	4	69

=== Disciplinary record ===
Includes all competitive matches. Players with 1 card or more included only.

As of 16 March 2010

Position	Nation	Number	Name	Serie A		Europe^{1}		Coppa Italia		Total	
Position	Nation	Number	Name	Yellow card	Red card	Yellow card	Red card	Yellow card	Red card	Yellow card	Red card
MF	(Brazil)	4	Felipe Melo	11	2	4	0	1	0	16	2
MF	(Mali)	22	Sissoko	9	1	0	0	0	0	9	1
MF	(Italy)	8	Marchisio	7	0	2	0	0	0	9	0
DF	(Italy)	5	Cannavaro	7	0	0	1	1	0	8	1
MF	(Italy)	16	Camoranesi	5	0	3	0	0	0	8	0
DF	(France)	15	Zebina	7	0	0	1	0	0	7	1
DF	(Italy)	33	Legrottaglie	4	0	3	0	0	0	7	0
DF	(Italy)	6	Grosso	6	0	0	0	0	0	6	0
FW	(Brazil)	11	Amauri	5	1	0	0	0	0	5	1
MF	(Denmark)	18	Poulsen	5	0	0	0	0	0	5	0
DF	(Czech Republic)	21	Grygera	4	0	0	0	0	0	4	0
MF	(Brazil)	28	Diego	3	0	1	0	0	0	4	0
MF	(Bosnia and Herzegovina)	7	Salihamidžić	4	0	0	1	1	0	5	1
MF	(Portugal)	30	Tiago	3	0	0	0	0	0	3	0
DF	(Uruguay)	2	Cáceres	3	1	1	0	0	0	4	1
MF	(Italy)	26	Candreva	2	0	0	0	0	0	2	0
DF	(Italy)	3	Chiellini	3	0	0	0	1	0	4	0
FW	(Italy)	10	Del Piero	3	0	0	0	0	0	3	0
MF	(Italy)	20	Giovinco	2	0	1	0	0	0	3	0
FW	(Italy)	9	Iaquinta	2	0	1	0	0	0	3	0
MF	(Italy)	39	Marrone	1	0	0	0	0	0	1	0
FW	(France)	17	Trezeguet	1	0	1	0	0	0	2	0
GK	(Italy)	1	Buffon	0	1	0	0	0	0	0	1
			TOTALS	99	6	18	3	5	0	122	9

^{1} Includes Champions League and Europa League
