= Mario Kirev =

Bulgarian footballer (born 1989)

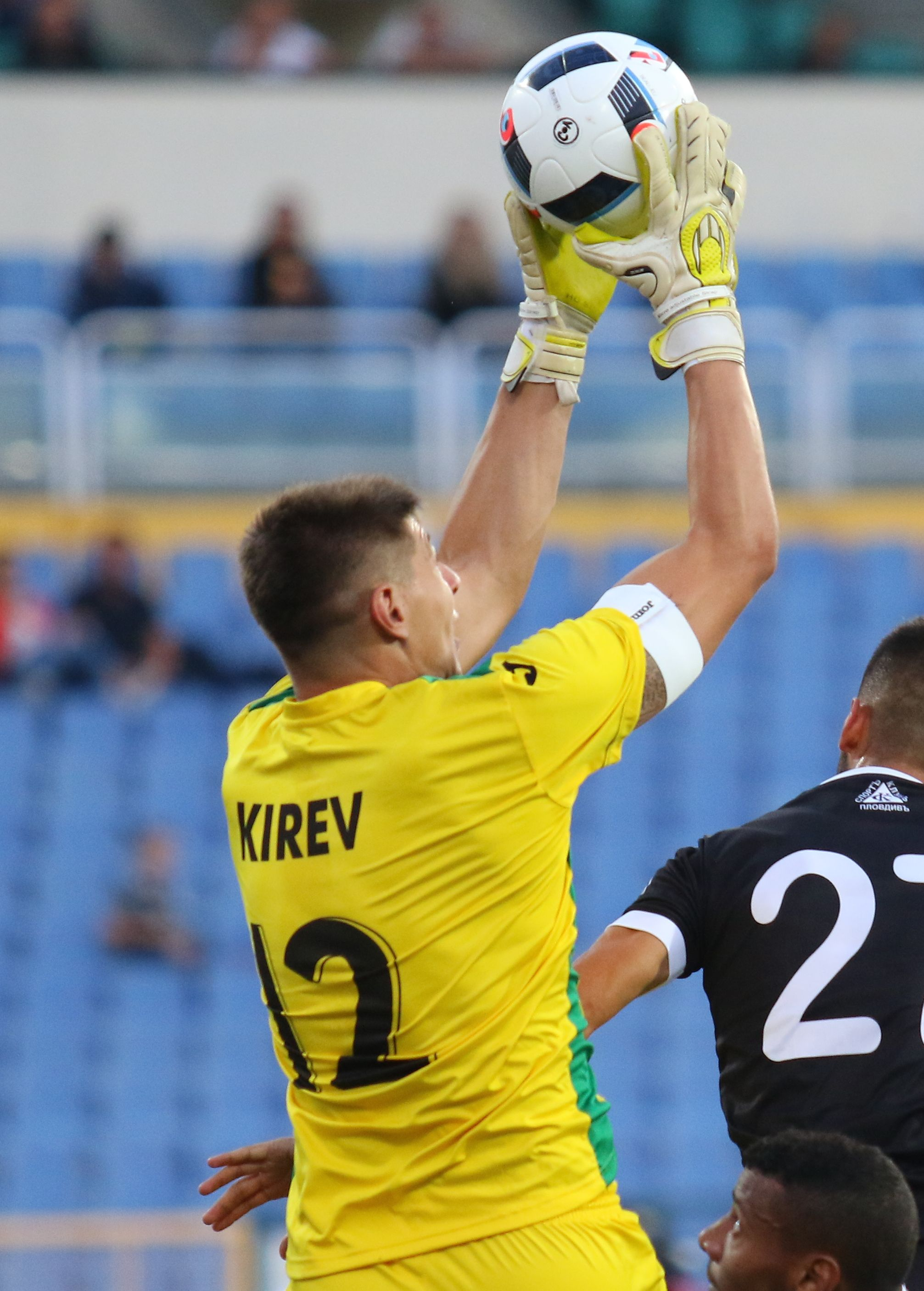

Personal information
- Full name: Mario Iliyanov Kirev
- Date of birth: 15 August 1989 (age 37)
- Place of birth: Dupnitsa, Bulgaria
- Height: 1.93 m (6 ft 4 in)
- Position: Goalkeeper

Youth career
- Germanea
- Slavia Sofia

Senior career*
| Years | Team | Apps | (Gls) |
| 2007–2009 | Slavia Sofia | 6 | (0) |
| 2009–2012 | Juventus | 0 | (0) |
| 2009 | → Grasshopper (loan) | 0 | (0) |
| 2010 | → FC Thun (loan) | 0 | (0) |
| 2011–2012 | → Poli Timişoara (loan) | 7 | (0) |
| 2012–2014 | ACS Poli Timișoara | 19 | (0) |
| 2014 | Olt Slatina | 1 | (0) |
| 2015–2017 | Slavia Sofia | 40 | (0) |
| 2017–2018 | Nea Salamina | 9 | (0) |
| 2018 | Kamza | 1 | (0) |
| 2019 | Drita | 11 | (0) |
| 2019–2020 | Olympiakos Nicosia | 4 | (0) |
| 2020 | Kyustendil | 6 | (0) |
| 2021 | Montana | 4 | (0) |
| 2021–2024 | Pirin Blagoevgrad | 3 | (0) |

International career
| 2008–2009 | Bulgaria U21 | 4 | (0) |
- * Club domestic league appearances and goals as of 16 September 2024

Mario Iliyanov Kirev (Bulgarian: Марио Илиянов Кирев; born 15 August 1989) is a Bulgarian professional footballer who plays as a goalkeeper.

== Club career ==
=== Youth career ===
Kirev began his career at FC Germanea. His first coach was Georgi Stanchev. At the age of fourteen, he began training with the junior team of Slavia Sofia.

=== Slavia Sofia ===
In August 2007 Kirev signed his first professional contract with Slavia. He made his competitive debut for the club on 25 April 2008 against Spartak Varna in the twenty five round of the Bulgarian top division. In next season (2008–09) Kirev was the first choice for goalkeeper of the coach Stevica Kuzmanovski. He earned 7 appearances playing in the A PFG.

=== Juventus ===
In December 2008, Kirev was invited by Serie A side Juventus to join trial period. On 30 January 2009, he signed a four-and-a-half-year contract.

In the following days Kirev was loaned for six months in the Swiss team Grasshopper Club Zürich. On 1 July 2009, he returned to Juventus. He was included in the Primavera squad that winning a second consecutive Torneo di Viareggio. However, he was the third keeper in the final. In February 2010, Kirev signed for FC Thun in Switzerland, in an attempt to gain first team experience.

On 1 July 2010, Kirev returned to Juventus and became the 5th keeper, behind injured Buffon, new signing Marco Storari, Alex Manninger and new signing Marco Costantino. He was called up to the first team, for the first time on 29 October 2010, against Milan.

In September 2011, Kirev joined Romanian Liga II side Politehnica Timișoara on a season long loan deal. He returned to Juventus on 1 July 2012.

On 6 July 2013 – Mario played in a friendly for Slovak side MFK Kosice against Hungarian side Debrecen, with MFK Kosice winning 4–1. This could signal a move to Slovakia and the end of his Juventus career.

=== Slavia Sofia ===
After six years spent abroad, Kirev returned to Slavia Sofia in the spring of 2015. His contract was terminated by mutual consent on 11 August 2017.

== International career ==
In August 2008 Mario became part of the Bulgaria national under-21 football team and he was at the time the only player on the team playing his trade outside of Bulgaria.
