= Andrea De Paola =

Italian footballer (born 1990)

Personal information
- Date of birth: 2 October 1990 (age 36)
- Place of birth: Gaeta, Italy
- Height: 1.83 m (6 ft 0 in)
- Position: Centre back

Youth career
- 1998–2008: Cisco Roma
- 2008: → Juventus (loan)
- 2008–2010: Juventus

Senior career*
Years	Team	Apps	(Gls)
2010–2011	Juventus	0	(0)
2011	→ Viareggio (loan)	5	(0)
2011–2014	Carpi	20	(1)
2012–2013	→ Carrarese (loan)	3	(0)
2015–2016	Cassino		
2016–2017	Flaminia	3	(0)
2017–2018	Formia		
Total		31	(1)

International career
2010–2011	Italy U20	3	(0)
- * Club domestic league appearances and goals

Andrea De Paola (born 2 October 1990) is an Italian former footballer who plays as a centre back.

== Club career ==
=== Early career ===
Born in Gaeta, Lazio, De Paola started his career at Lazio-based team Cisco Roma. In the 2007–08 season he was a member of Berretti under-20 team, following nine prior seasons with the club's youth team.

=== Juventus ===
In January 2008 he was signed by Serie A club Juventus on a 6-month loan deal, before signing for the club permanently in June 2008. He became a regular in Primavera squadra as his side won the 2010 Torneo di Viareggio. He regularly partnered with Raffaele Alcibiade as starting centre-backs in that tournament, only being rested in the third match of the group stage. De Paola remained in the "Primavera" in the 2010–11 season as overage player. He also received a few select call-ups to the first team, wearing the number 45 jersey in the 2010–11 UEFA Europa League under then-coach Luigi Delneri. De Paola was eligible to Europa as List B player.

=== Loan Deals ===
In January 2011, he was loaned to Italian third division club F.C. Esperia Viareggio, rejoining former bianconeri teammates Carlo Pinsoglio, Giorgio Merlano, Tommaso Silvestri, Luca Castiglia and Alessandro D'Antoni, who also were playing their trades on loan at the Lega Pro Prima Divisione side. De Paola only played 5 times in the league, plus one more match in the play-offs. He returned to Juventus on 30 June 2011, but was ultimately transferred out again on 5 July 2011, when he joined Carpi, also of the Lega Pro Prima Divisione, in co-ownership deal. On 21 June 2012, the co-ownership deal was renewed but in July signed by Carrarese Calcio in temporary deal.

=== International career ===
De Paola made his U-20 debut in March 2010, in 2009–10 Four Nations Tournament. He also played once in 2011 edition, on 25 March 2011 partnering Alcibiade (round 5). He played his last match in the next game, against Spain, also partnering Alcibiade. De Paola did not play in the round 6 of Four Nations Tournament.
