= Giuseppe Giovinco =

Italian footballer (born 1990)

Personal information
- Date of birth: 26 September 1990 (age 36)
- Place of birth: Turin, Italy
- Height: 1.67 m (5 ft 6 in)
- Positions: Attacking midfielder; forward

Team information
- Current team: Taranto
- Number: 32

Youth career
- Juventus

Senior career*
Years	Team	Apps	(Gls)
2010–2012	Carrarese	51	(3)
2012–2013	Viareggio	26	(7)
2013–2015	Pisa	34	(7)
2015	Savona	14	(0)
2016	Tuttocuoio	15	(2)
2016–2017	Catanzaro	31	(9)
2017–2018	Matera	26	(5)
2018–2019	Imolese	34	(1)
2019–2020	Ravenna	24	(6)
2020–2021	Renate	31	(4)
2021–2022	Taranto	35	(9)
2022–2023	Catania	19	(3)
2023–2024	Virtus Francavilla	19	(4)
2024	→ Fermana (loan)	15	(1)
2024–2025	Taranto	14	(0)
2025–	Fossano		
- * Club domestic league appearances and goals

Giuseppe Giovinco (born 26 September 1990) is an Italian professional footballer who plays as a second striker for Eccellenza club Fossano.

== Club career ==
=== Juventus and Carrarese ===
Born in Turin, Giovinco followed his elder brother Sebastian into the Juventus youth system, playing for the under-18 side in the Berretti league in 2007–08 and for the under-20 reserve team from 2008 to 2010, with whom he won the 2010 Torneo di Viareggio as an attacking midfielder.

In the summer of 2010, Giovinco joined fourth-division Carrarese in a co-ownership deal and won the promotion play-offs in his first season. He made 25 appearances in the 2011–12 Lega Pro Prima Divisione, and Juventus relinquished their remaining stake in him in June 2012.

=== Viareggio, Pisa and Savona ===
On 31 August 2012, Giovinco moved to fellow third-division club Viareggio, having already played twice and scored once for Carrarese in that season's Coppa Italia. He was Viareggio's joint-leading scorer in the league with seven goals and added four more in the 2012–13 Coppa Italia Lega Pro, in which the club reached the final; suspended for the second leg after a second booking of the competition, he watched Viareggio lose on aggregate to Latina.

Signed by Spezia of Serie B on a free transfer on 5 July 2013, Giovinco left a month later without playing a competitive match, joining third-division Pisa on a two-year contract. In January 2015 he moved to Savona on a two-and-a-half-year deal, but was released in October of that year.

=== Later career ===
Giovinco spent the following years in the Italian third division, joining Tuttocuoio in January 2016 and moving on to Catanzaro that summer, then Matera, Imolese, Ravenna in September 2019 and Renate in August 2020, for whom he scored six goals in 35 matches.

The most productive of these spells came at Taranto, whom he joined on 20 August 2021 and for whom he scored nine goals in 35 league matches. He spent 2022–23 with the refounded Catania in Serie D, before returning to Serie C with Virtus Francavilla on 1 September 2023 and spending the second half of that season on loan at Fermana.

Giovinco rejoined Taranto on 22 August 2024 on a contract to the end of the season, but the club was in financial collapse: successive points deductions left it below zero in the table, and it was excluded from Serie C in March 2025. In September 2025, he dropped into the Eccellenza with Fossano of Piedmont.

== Style of play ==
Giovinco usually plays as a second striker, but is also capable of playing as an attacking midfielder. He has also been used as a winger on occasion.

== Personal life ==
Although Giovinco was born in Torino, his father Giovanni is originally from Bisacquino in the Province of Palermo, Sicily, while his mother Elvira is from Catanzaro in Calabria. His older brother Sebastian is also an ex footballer who played as a forward; the two brothers grew up together playing in the Juventus Youth Academy.
