= Sebastian Giovinco =

Italian footballer (born 1987)

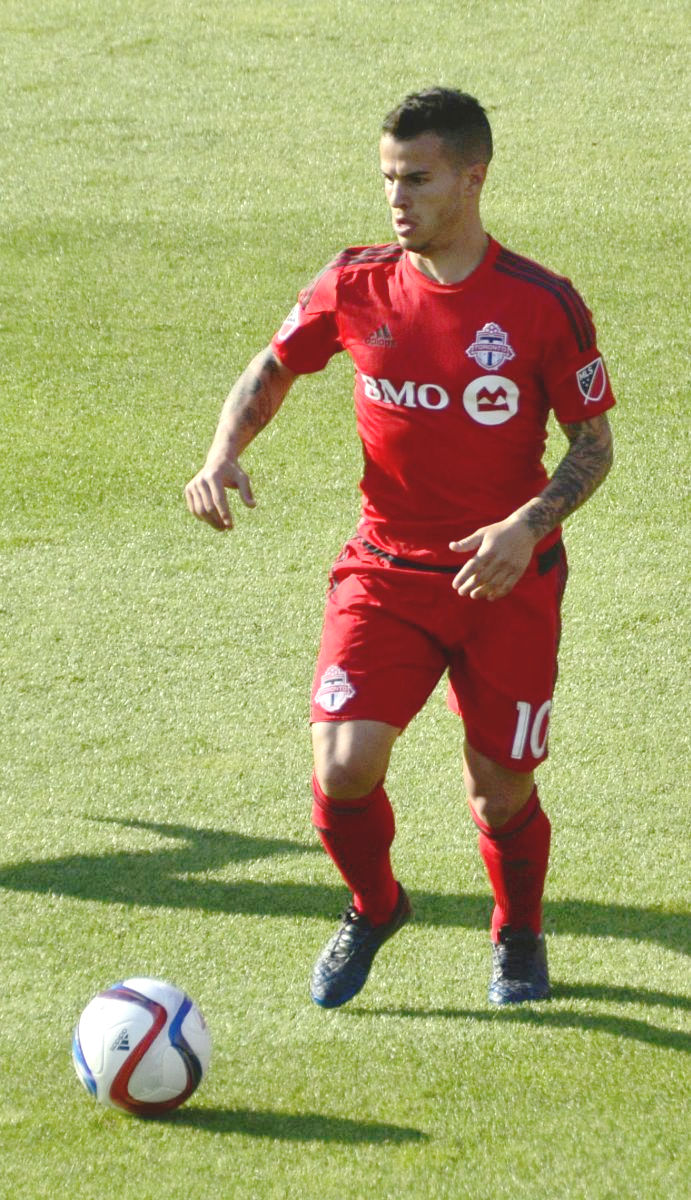
- Giovinco playing for Toronto FC in 2015

Personal information
- Full name: Sebastian Giovinco
- Date of birth: 26 January 1987 (age 39)
- Place of birth: Turin, Italy
- Height: 1.60 m (5 ft 3 in)
- Position: Forward

Youth career
- 1996–2006: Juventus

Senior career*
Years	Team	Apps	(Gls)
2006–2015	Juventus	92	(12)
2007–2008	→ Empoli (loan)	35	(6)
2010–2012	→ Parma (loan)	66	(22)
2015–2019	Toronto FC	114	(68)
2019–2021	Al Hilal	57	(12)
2022	Sampdoria	2	(0)
Total		366	(120)

International career
2003	Italy U16	7	(4)
2003–2004	Italy U17	7	(1)
2005	Italy U18	4	(0)
2006	Italy U19	1	(1)
2006–2007	Italy U20	4	(0)
2007–2009	Italy U21	20	(1)
2008	Italy U23 (Olympics)	10	(3)
2011–2015	Italy	23	(1)
Medal record
Representing Italy
Association football
UEFA European Championship
Runner-up	2012 Poland & Ukraine
FIFA Confederations Cup
Third place	Brazil 2013
- * Club domestic league appearances and goals

Sebastian Giovinco (Italian pronunciation: [seˈbastjan dʒoˈviŋko]; born 26 January 1987) is an Italian former professional footballer who played as a forward. A quick and creative player on the ball, Giovinco was a versatile attacker capable of playing in multiple offensive positions but mainly operating behind a lone striker as a trequartista.

Giovinco began his professional career with Italian club Juventus in Serie B in 2006, and soon spent loan spells with Italian clubs Empoli and Parma. He signed for Toronto FC in 2015, a deal which made him the league's highest paid player. Across his four seasons with the club, he won three Canadian Championships as well as a historic domestic treble in 2017, which included the team's maiden MLS Cup and Supporters' Shield titles. Individually, Giovinco also won the MLS Golden Boot, the MLS Newcomer of the Year Award, the MLS MVP Award, the George Gross Memorial Trophy for the most valuable player of the Canadian Championship, and the CONCACAF Champions League Golden Ball in 2018, a tournament in which Toronto finished as runners-up. Giovinco left Toronto FC in 2019 as the club's all-time top goalscorer.

Giovinco would join Saudi Arabian club Al Hilal, where he won the AFC Champions League in his first year with the team and the Saudi Pro League and King Cup in his second season. He then returned to Italy for a brief stint with Sampdoria in 2022.

At international level, Giovinco made his debut with the Italy senior side in 2011, and collected 23 caps; he also took part at UEFA Euro 2012, where his side finished as runners-up, and at the 2013 FIFA Confederations Cup, where he won a bronze medal and scored his only international goal.

== Early life ==
Giovinco was born in Turin to a Sicilian father, Giovanni, originally from Bisacquino in the province of Palermo, and a Calabrian mother, Elvira, originally from Catanzaro, who moved from Southern Italy. He grew up in Beinasco, a comune southwest of the city, in a family of Milan fans, and joined the Juventus youth system in 1996, when he was nine. His younger brother Giuseppe was also part of the Juventus Youth Academy and currently plays in Serie C.

== Club career ==
=== Juventus ===
==== Youth career and professional debut with Juventus ====
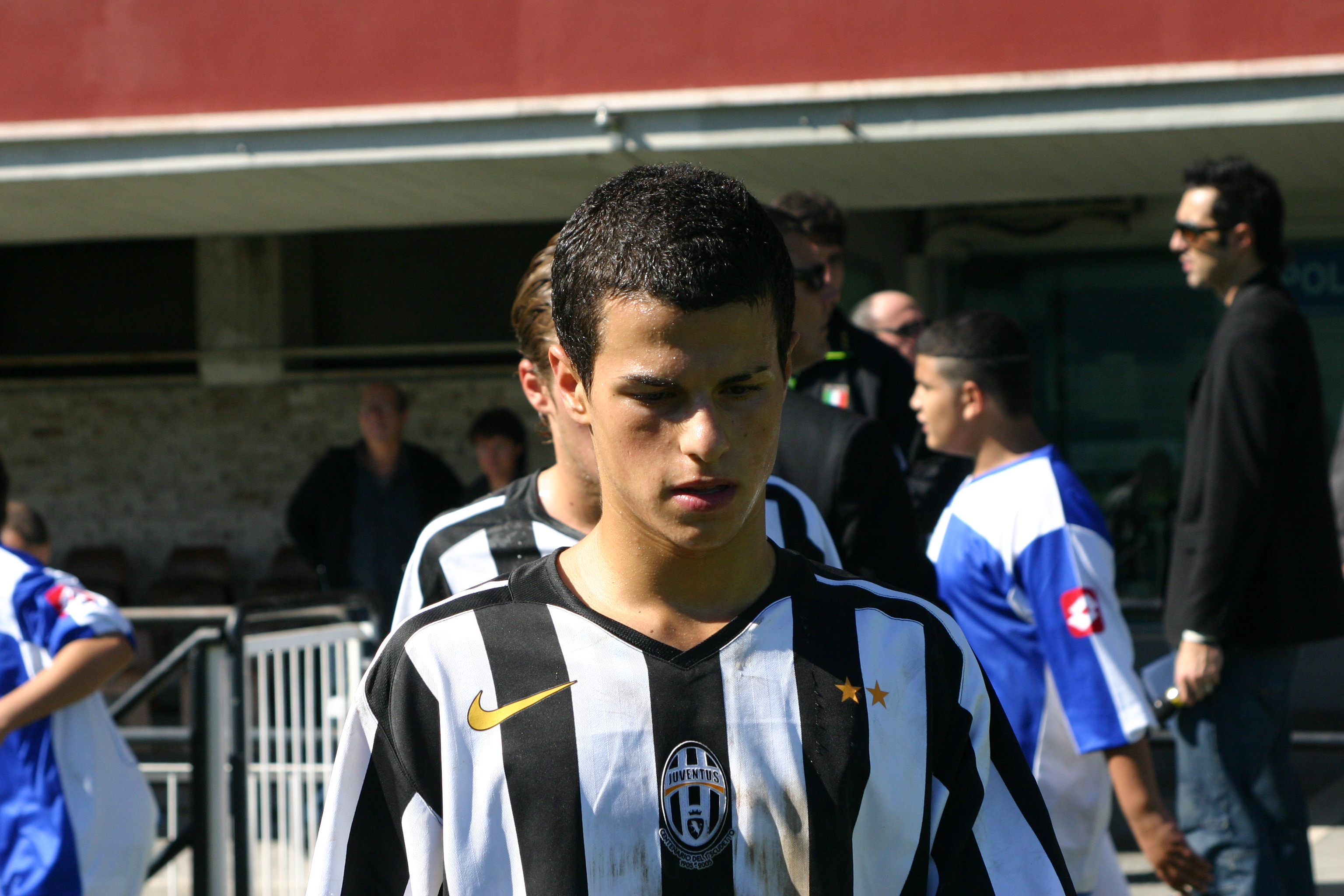
Giovinco in the Juventus youth sector in 2005

After joining the Juventus youth system, Giovinco flourished through the ranks of the club and impressed especially during the 2005–06 season, winning the Campionato Nazionale Primavera, as well as the Coppa Italia and Supercoppa Primavera, and also reaching the final at the Viareggio Tournament, where he was named best player of the competition.

Giovinco was promoted to the first team during the 2006–07 season and also played his last season in the Primavera squad. His professional debut came on 12 May 2007, in the Serie B match against Bologna; he came on as a substitute in place of Raffaele Palladino, and marked his first appearance with an assist for David Trezeguet's tap-in. Since then, he had been tipped to be Alessandro Del Piero's heir in the creative number 10 role behind the main striker, known as the trequartista, rifinitore, or fantasista, in Italian. Juventus won the Serie B title that season, earning promotion to Serie A the following season.

==== Loan to Empoli ====
On 4 July 2007, Giovinco was loaned out to Empoli. He made his Serie A debut on 26 August, coming on as a substitute against Fiorentina. Giovinco scored his first Serie A goal on 30 September against Palermo in a 3–1 win. He made his European debut in the UEFA Cup on 4 October against Zürich. Giovinco finished his first season in Serie A with 6 goals in 35 appearances, and was given the Leone d’Argento award, by the club. Despite Giovinco's promising performances, Empoli were unable to avoid relegation, and he returned to Juventus at the end of the season.

==== Second spell with Juventus ====
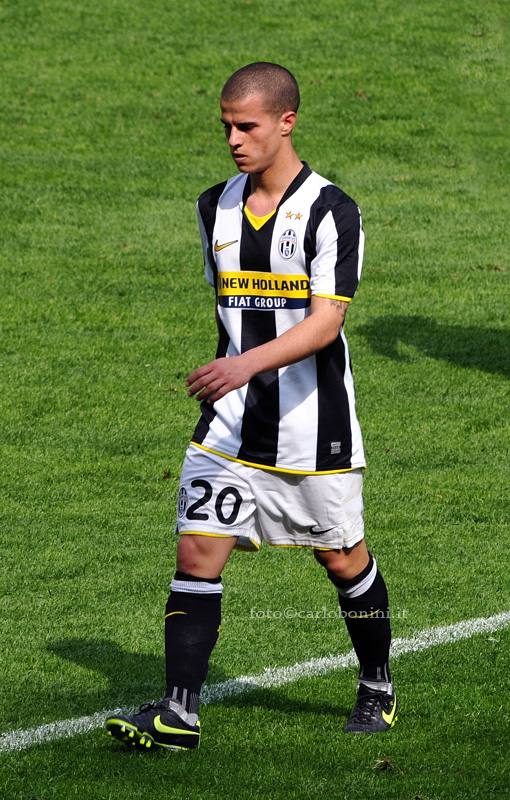
Giovinco playing for Juventus in 2009

On 26 June 2008, Giovinco officially returned to Juventus. Giovinco played his first Serie A match for Juventus on 24 September, against Catania, before assisting both goals for Vincenzo Iaquinta in the 2–2 draw with BATE Borisov in the Champions League on 30 September, his first start for the club. On 7 December, he scored his first goal for Juventus, a free kick against Lecce in a 2–1 win. In October 2008, he signed a contract extension, tying him to Juventus until the summer of 2013. Despite a promising start, Giovinco did not play regularly and made sporadic appearances throughout the season, both in the starting eleven and off the bench, as he struggled to fit into Claudio Ranieri's preferred 4–4–2 formation, and was often used out of position on the left wing. However, he did earn praise in the media for the Man of the match performance that he produced when he was started in Juventus's home fixture in Serie A against Bologna on 14 March 2009, in which he first set-up a goal from a corner and later scored another from a half-volley to help Juventus come from behind to win the match 4–1. He eventually finished the season with 3 goals in 27 appearances in all competitions, 2 of which came from 19 Serie A appearances.

The following season, when the club's new manager, Ciro Ferrara, was forced into a tactical switch due to injuries to first choice midfielders, Mauro Camoranesi and Claudio Marchisio, Giovinco was variously inserted into the starting line-up; he helped Juventus to a 5–1 defeat of Sampdoria in only his fourth start of the season. Under the following manager, Alberto Zaccheroni, he was hardly featured. In April, he sustained a training ground injury and was ruled out for the rest of the season after undergoing tests.

==== Loan to Parma ====
On 5 August 2010, Parma announced the signing of Giovinco on loan from Juventus, with an option to buy half of the player's transfer rights at the end of the season. He made his Parma debut against Brescia in a 2–0 win on 29 August. He scored his first goal for Parma on 12 September 2010, a free kick in a 2–1 loss to Catania. An impressive start to the season earned Giovinco a call up to represent the Italy national team. On 6 January 2011, Giovinco scored two goals for Parma in a 4–1 win against his parent club, Juventus. After initially struggling to settle-in at Parma, he refound his form towards the end of the season and made his break-through with the club, finishing his first season at the club with 7 goals in 30 appearances in the league. At the end of the season, on 22 June 2011, Parma exercised the option to buy half of Giovinco's contract for a fee of €3 million.

On 11 September, the first match of the 2011–12 season, Giovinco scored against Juventus once again, where he found the net from a penalty in a 4–1 away defeat. On 6 May, he scored a volley from 30 yards out against Siena in the penultimate match of the season, which ended in a 2–0 away win. In his second season with Parma, Giovinco finished as the club's leading goalscorer (15) and assist provider (11) in Serie A, helping the team to an eighth-place finish in the league; in total, he made 70 appearances during his two seasons with the club, scoring 23 goals, and providing 22 assists.

==== Return to Juventus ====
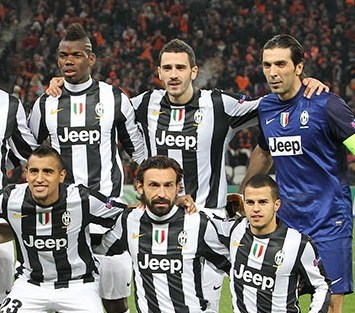
Giovinco (bottom right) with Juventus in 2013

On 21 June 2012, Juventus announced that it had purchased the other half of Giovinco's transfer rights from Parma for €11 million, tying him to the Turin club until 30 June 2015. Although he had stated that he would have been pleased to wear the number 10 shirt, which was vacated after Juventus legend Alessandro Del Piero left the club, Giovinco was handed the number 12 jersey under manager Antonio Conte. On 11 August 2012, Giovinco won his first title with Juventus, helping the team to defeat Napoli 4–2 in the 2012 Supercoppa Italiana. Giovinco started in the first league match of the 2012–13 season against his former club, Parma; Juventus won the match 2–0, although Giovinco suffered a minor injury two minutes from the end of the game. In the following league match against Udinese on 2 September, Giovinco scored two goals and won a penalty, which was converted by Chilean teammate Arturo Vidal, as Juventus went on to defeat the Friuli team 4–1 in Udine.

Giovinco scored his first career UEFA Champions League goal against FC Nordsjælland on 7 November, a match which Juventus won 4–0 at Juventus Stadium. He scored the third goal as Juventus beat defending champions Chelsea 3–0 at home, and also contributed to Juventus' 1–0 away win against Shakhtar Donetsk, which allowed Juventus to top their group undefeated and advance to the knockout stages for first time since the 2008–09 tournament. On 1 December, Giovinco scored his fifth league goal of the season in the Derby della Mole against Torino, also recording an assist on one of Claudio Marchisio's two goals in a 3–0 victory at home. Giovinco scored the only goal of the match in a Coppa Italia 1–0 win against Cagliari, allowing Juventus to progress to the quarter-finals of the competition; coincidentally, Giovinco (who was wearing the number 12 shirt for Juventus at the time) scored in the 12th minute of the second half of the match, which took place on 12 December 2012 (12/12/12), while the goal was also his twelfth for the club. Juventus eventually managed to retain their Serie A title that season, with Giovinco managing 7 goals in the league, and 11 in total in all competitions, as Juventus reached the quarter-finals of the 2012–13 UEFA Champions League, and the semi-finals of the 2012–13 Coppa Italia, only to lose out to the winners of the respective competitions, Bayern Munich and Lazio.

Giovinco missed out on Juventus's 2013 Supercoppa Italiana victory, and he initially went scoreless in the 2013–14 season until finally netting a notable goal in a 3–2 win over rivals Milan on 6 October 2013. Giovinco fell out of form again and struggled to gain playing time, but he managed to break his goal drought on 14 April 2014, with a goal against Udinese, taking the ball past a defender and scoring with a left footed curling shot from outside the box. Overall, Giovinco managed 2 goals in 17 Serie A appearances that season, and one goal in the Coppa Italia, as Juventus won their third consecutive Serie A title. During the 2014–15 season under Massimiliano Allegri, Giovinco scored two goals in a 6–1 win over Hellas Verona in the Coppa Italia, on 15 January 2015, helping Juventus to the quarter-finals of the competition; both of his goals came in the first half, with the first coming from a free kick, and the second in injury time.

=== Toronto FC ===
==== 2015 season: MLS MVP ====
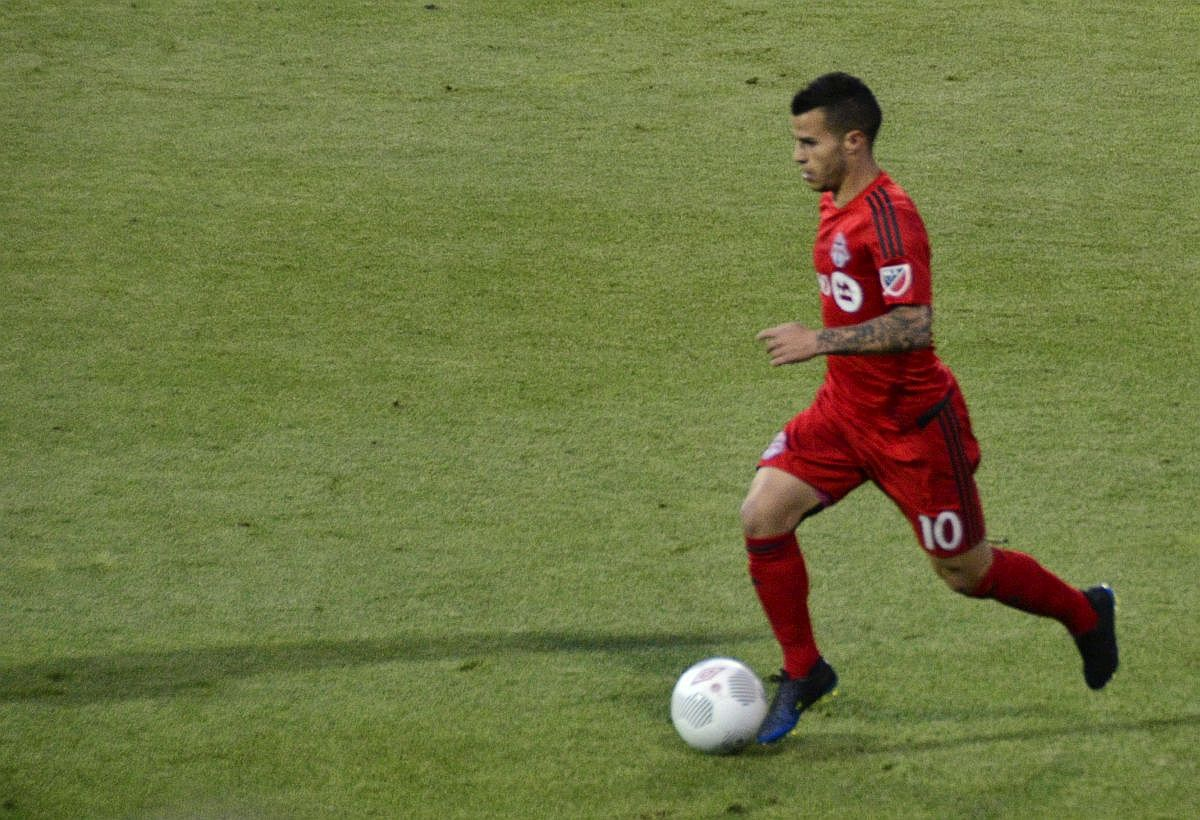
Giovinco playing for Toronto FC in 2015

On 19 January 2015, Giovinco signed with Canadian team Toronto FC of Major League Soccer (MLS). He was set to join the team upon the completion of the Serie A season in July 2015. He signed a five-year contract with a reported annual salary of $7 million, making him the highest paid player in MLS ahead of Orlando City SC's Kaká, and the highest paid Italian player in all leagues. On 2 February, Juventus announced that Giovinco had left the club five months earlier than originally expected in order to kick-start his career in MLS with Toronto FC. Giovinco made his debut for Toronto FC against Vancouver Whitecaps FC on 7 March. He provided an assist for Jozy Altidore's equalising goal in the 32nd minute. He scored his first goal for Toronto FC on 4 April, in a 3–2 loss to Chicago Fire, also later setting up Benoît Cheyrou's goal. On 13 May, Giovinco scored and assisted a goal in a 3–2 home win over Montreal Impact in the return leg of the 2015 Canadian Championship semi-finals, although Montreal progressed to the final on away goals, having won the home leg 1–0. After setting up two goals in TFC's 3–1 home win over San José on 30 May, Giovinco was voted Major League Soccer Player of the Week by the North American Soccer Reporters, for week 13 of the 2015 MLS season. Following his two goals in Toronto FC's 2–1 away win over D.C. United, he was named MLS Player of the Week for a second consecutive time the following week.

On 12 July 2015, Giovinco achieved Toronto FC's first ever hat-trick in MLS play against New York City FC in a 4–4 draw at Yankee Stadium, and set up the fourth goal during the match, also missing a penalty. It was also the third fastest hat trick scored in the league's history at 9 minutes. Following the match, he received the player of the week award for the third time in the 2015 MLS season. After scoring and assisting in a 2–1 home win over Philadelphia Union on 18 July 2015, Giovinco was one of the 22 players to be named to the 2015 MLS All-Star Game roster, although he was later ruled out of the match due to injury, and replaced by his teammate Altidore. On 5 August 2015, Giovinco scored a hat-trick in a 4–1 home win over Orlando City to bring him to the top of the MLS scoring tables with 16 goals, also breaking the club's single-season record of 15 goals set in 2010 by Dwayne De Rosario in the process. On 6 August 2015, he was named the Etihad Airways MLS Player of the Month for July 2015. On 14 August 2015, Giovinco's free kick goal against Orlando City was awarded the MLS Goal of the Week Award. On 29 August 2015, he was substituted in the 51st minute in a 2–1 win over Montreal Impact due to an adductor strain; although it was reported that the injury was not serious, he was ruled out indefinitely. On 3 September 2015, he was named the MLS Player of the Month for August, winning the award for a second consecutive time. He returned to the starting line-up in a 3–1 home defeat to the New England Revolution ten days later.

On 26 September, Giovinco broke the MLS record for most combined goals and assists in a single season, previously held by Chris Wondolowski, with his 15th and 16th assists of the season in a 3–2 home win over Chicago, bringing his total tally to 35. Upon review the following day, Jonathan Osorio's goal from a Giovinco "cross" was later credited as Giovinco's goal by the MLS, which meant that he broke another record, by becoming the first player to manage at least 20 goals and 10 assists in a single MLS season, as his 16th assist was changed to his 20th goal.

On 14 October, after coming off the bench, he scored the decisive goal in a 2–1 home win over New York Red Bulls, when he started a dribbling run past several players on the left flank, which culminated in a left-footed strike just inside the area; the win allowed Toronto FC to qualify for the MLS playoffs for the first time in their history. This goal was later nominated as a finalist for the MLS Goal of the Year Award, but was beaten out by Krisztián Németh. Several pundits praised his performances, expressing the opinion that this goal was the best goal of the season, and the greatest in Toronto FC's club history. The pundits also praised Giovinco as arguably not only one of the top players of the current MLS season, but also already as one of the greatest players in MLS history. Giovinco had just returned from international duty earlier that day, having appeared for Italy the day before in a Euro 2016 qualifying match in Rome. On 25 October 2015, Giovinco assisted Altidore in a 2–1 away defeat to Montreal in the final match of the regular season, ending the regular season with 22 goals and 16 assists, which allowed him to win the 2015 Audi MLS Golden Boot as both the joint top-scorer (alongside Kei Kamara) and the top-assist provider of the league in his first year with the club, with a record 38 combined goals and assists; as a result, he became the first MLS player ever to win both the top scorer and the top assist provider awards in the same season, as well as the first Italian and Toronto FC player to win these awards. In the playoffs, Toronto FC were eliminated in the knock-out round, following a 3–0 away defeat to domestic rivals Montreal Impact on 29 October. In November 2015, Giovinco was named one of the three finalists for both the 2015 MLS Newcomer of the Year Award and the 2015 MLS MVP Award, winning both awards on 23 November and 2 December respectively, while three days before the latter, on 29 November, he was named to the MLS Best XI. On 30 December, Giovinco was named the "Transaction of the Year" by MLS.

==== 2016 season: Canadian Championship and first MLS Cup appearance ====
Giovinco started off his second season with an 82nd-minute penalty in a 2–0 away win over Supporters' Shield holders New York Red Bulls, on 6 March; he later also set up Marky Delgado's goal in added time. On 16 April, he scored the then-fastest goal in Toronto FC history at 57 seconds in a 1–0 away win over D.C. United, surpassing the previous record holder Reggie Lambe's by one minute and 50 seconds set in 2012. A week later, he scored both goals in a 2–0 win away to the Montreal Impact in the 401 Derby; with these goals, he equalled De Rosario as the club's all-time top scorer in the MLS with 28 goals in 40 appearances. Giovinco was named to the Team of the Week for his performances. On 7 May, Toronto's home opener, he set up rookie Tsubasa Endoh for his first ever MLS goal in a 1–0 win over FC Dallas, at the newly renovated BMO Field. On 14 May, Giovinco overtook De Rosario as the club's outright all-time top scorer in the MLS, scoring two goals and setting up another in a 4–3 home defeat to Canadian rivals Vancouver. On 29 June, Giovinco helped Toronto FC win the Canadian Championship over Vancouver 2–2 on aggregate, winning on away goals, as he scored the only goal in the first leg on 21 June. On 14 July, he won the 2016 Best MLS Player ESPY Award. In July 2016, Giovinco was included in the roster for the 2016 MLS All-Star Game.

After an eight-game goal drought, Giovinco scored a hat-trick against D.C. United, on 23 July, in a 4–1 home win, also surpassing De Rosario's previous all-time record as Toronto FC's top scorer by two goals to 35 goals. With two goals from free kicks during the match, including his seventh in the MLS, he broke David Beckham's record for most goals from set-pieces in the league since 2010. He was named to the Team of the Week once again for his performances, and was also named MLS Player of the Week for the first time that season. On 27 August, Giovinco was brought off the field after the later diagnosis of strains in his quadriceps and adductor in the eventual 1–0 loss in the 401 Derby with Montreal at home; although he was initially expected to be sidelined for a month, the injury was more severe than expected, and he ended up missing seven weeks of play. He finally returned to action on 16 October, against Montreal once again, helping to set up Toronto FC's equaliser in a 2–2 away draw. On 26 October, Giovinco scored the opening goal of a 3–1 home win over Philadelphia, both his and Toronto FC's first MLS Playoff goal in the MLS Cup Playoffs, and was later involved in his team's next two goals; this was Toronto FC's first ever playoff win, which enabled the team to progress to the Eastern Conference Semi-finals for the first time. On 6 November in the second leg of the Eastern Conference Semi-finals, Giovinco scored a hat-trick in a 5–0 away win over New York City FC, 7–0 on aggregate, to progress to the Eastern Conference Finals in an all Canadian derby against Montreal Impact. In the first leg of the Eastern Conference Final on 22 November, Giovinco set up Jozy Altidore's goal in a 3–2 away loss to Montreal. Toronto FC later beat Montreal Impact 5–2 in extra time in the return leg at home on 30 November, as Giovinco once again set up Altidore's goal, winning on an aggregated score of 7–5, making Toronto FC the first Canadian team to compete in an MLS Cup Final; although he was forced off in the 97th minute due to cramp in his calf, he was later declared fit to play against Seattle Sounders FC in the 2016 MLS Cup Final. On 5 December, he was named to the MLS Best XI for the second season in a row, despite being left off the finalists list for the MLS MVP.

In the 2016 MLS Cup Final against Seattle, held at BMO Field on 10 December, Giovinco's performance was largely stifled by Seattle's heavy and aggressive defending, despite initially creating an early goalscoring chance for Altidore; throughout the match, he was fouled a total of six times and had several shots blocked. A scoring opportunity came in the 48th minute, but his shot was skewed wide of the near post. He was eventually substituted for Tosaint Ricketts in the 103rd minute, due to an apparent injury, and consequently, despite being the club's main penalty kick taker, was not used in the resulting shoot-out, which Toronto FC lost 5–4, following a 0–0 draw after extra-time. Regarding Giovinco's substitution, coach Greg Vanney stated in the post-match press conference: "He couldn't move. He looked at me. It's not like I take him off because I want to. I look at him and he gives me the sign that he can’t go any more and when he feels like he can’t go, he feels like he’s more of a liability to the group than anything. That’s the decision. It's not one that I generally want to make, but we had to."

==== 2017 season: Domestic treble ====
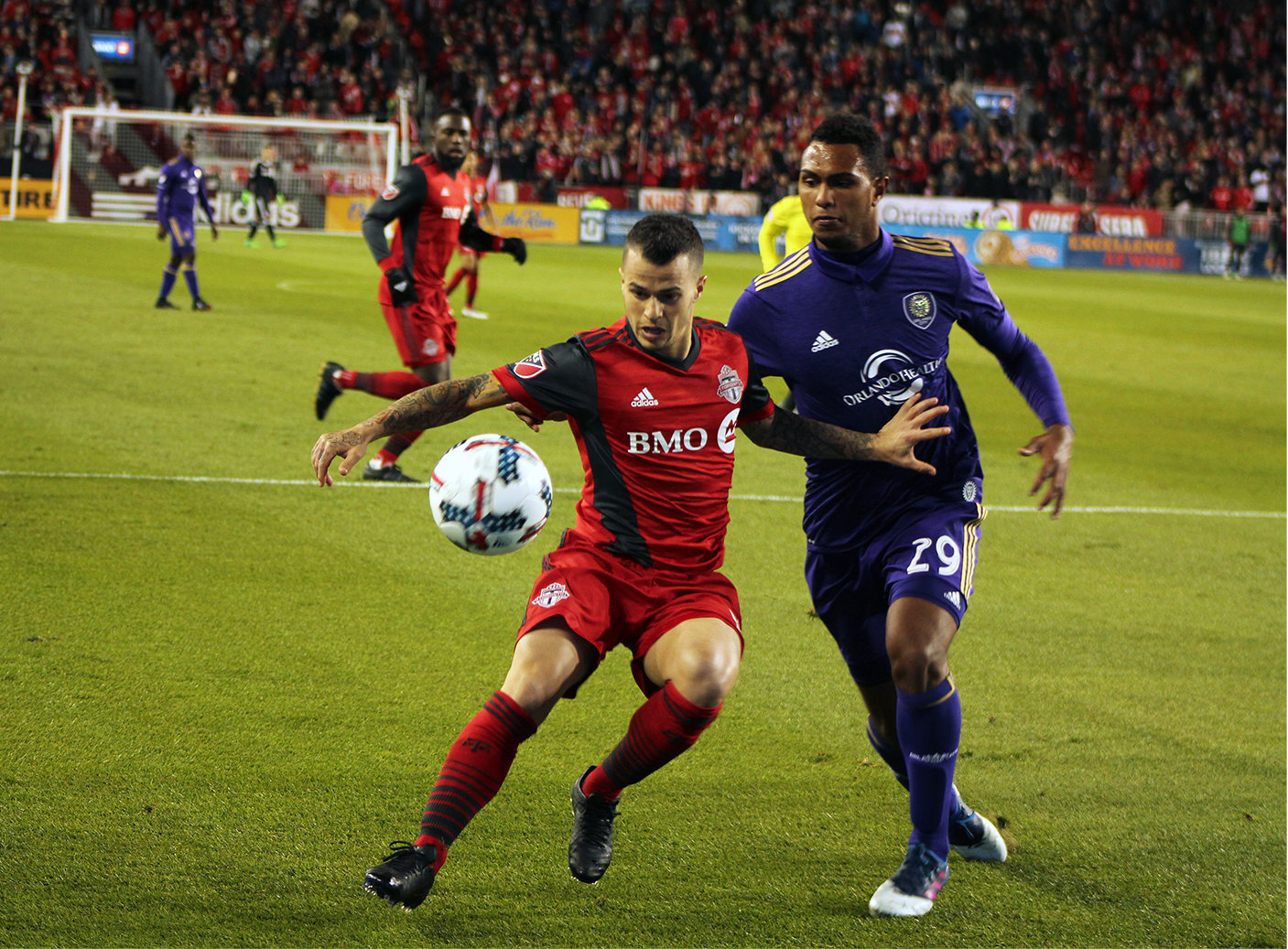
Giovinco playing for Toronto FC in 2017

The arrival of Spanish playmaker Victor Vázquez in midfield at the beginning of the 2017 season saw less responsibility placed on Giovinco and captain Michael Bradley to create Toronto FC's goalscoring opportunities, and this in turn freed up the Italian, enabling him to focus more on his attacking game. Coach Greg Vanney also switched tactics from a 4–4–2 diamond to a 3–5–2 formation, benefiting Giovinco's and Altidore's attacking partnership by allowing them to play closer together, and with Vázquez supporting them as the team's main creator, the attacking duo began to demonstrate a deeper understanding and an increased awareness of each other's movements, which improved their link-up play, and saw an increase in Altidore's goalscoring output throughout the season.

Giovinco scored his first goal of the season in a 2–2 home draw to expansion team Atlanta United FC, on 8 April 2017. On 27 June, Giovinco scored both goals in a 2–1 home win over Montreal in the 2017 Canadian Championship final second leg – edging Montreal 3–2 on aggregate; he also won the George Gross Memorial Trophy for the most valuable player of the tournament. On 30 July, Giovinco scored two goals and set up another in a 4–0 home win over New York City FC; his second goal of the match, which came from a free kick, was his 50th MLS goal, and his record-breaking 10th MLS goal from a free kick. While Giovinco was ruled out on injury, Toronto FC won the Supporters' Shield for most points in the league that season, following a 4–2 home win over New York Red Bulls on 30 September. In Toronto FC's last match of the regular season on 22 October, Giovinco scored from a free kick on his 100th appearance for the club in a 2–2 away draw to Atlanta; in doing so, Toronto FC broke the MLS regular season point record of 68 points, set by LA Galaxy in 1998, by one point. The goal was also Giovinco's sixth free kick goal of the season, which set the record for most free kicks scored in an MLS regular-season. On 30 October, in the first leg of the Eastern Conference Semi-finals in the 2017 MLS Cup Playoffs, Giovinco scored the match-winning goal from a free kick in a 2–1 away win over New York Red Bulls. Giovinco was subsequently included among the finalists for the 2017 MLS MVP award, after being omitted from the list of finalists for the award the previous season. On 5 November, in the second leg of the Eastern Conference Semi-finals, Giovinco received a booking for dissent in the 80th minute, causing his suspension for the Conference Finals as he also received a yellow in the first leg; Toronto FC lost the match 1–0 at home, but still advanced to the next round on away goals. Giovinco returned to action in the second leg of the Eastern Conference Finals against Columbus Crew on 29 November, at BMO field; he was involved in the only goal of the match, scored by Altidore, which saw Toronto win the Eastern Conference for the second consecutive year, and earn a place in the 2017 MLS Cup Final. On 30 November, Giovinco was named to the MLS Best XI for the third season in a row. On 9 December, in a rematch of the previous year's final at BMO field, Toronto defeated Seattle 2–0 in the 2017 MLS Cup, and became the first MLS team to complete a domestic treble with their victory, as well as the first Canadian team to win the MLS Cup; Giovinco was involved in both goals, and gave the final pass to goalscorer Altidore for the opener.

==== 2018 season: Third Canadian Championship, Champions League Final and MLS struggles ====
On 20 February 2018, Giovinco opened the season with his first appearance in the CONCACAF Champions League, the first leg of a round of 16 match-up away to the Colorado Rapids, where he set up Jonathan Osorio's opening goal before later adding one himself for a 2–0 win. On 7 March, in the first leg of the CONCACAF Champions League quarter-finals, Giovinco set up Jonathan Osorio in the last minute of regulation time to give Toronto FC a 2–1 home win against Mexican side Tigres UANL. In the second leg, held on 13 March, Giovinco was involved in both of his team's goals in an eventual 3–2 away defeat, helping to create an own goal and later scoring another himself from a free kick; the result enabled Toronto FC to progress to the semi-finals of the competition for only the second time in their history, on away goals, following a 4–4 draw on aggregate. On 3 April, Giovinco scored the opening goal from the penalty spot in a 3–1 home win over Club América in the first leg of the semi-final, later setting up Toronto FC's goal in the 1–1 away draw at the Estadio Azteca in the second leg on 10 April, to advance 4–2 on aggregate to the finals. After a 2–1 home loss to Guadalajara on 17 April in the first leg of the finals, Giovinco scored the aggregate-equalising goal in 2–1 away win to Guadalajara in the return leg on 25 April, which took the match straight to penalty shoot-out; Giovinco scored Toronto FC's first penalty but eventually lost the Champions League final 4–2 in a penalty shoot-out. Giovinco won the Golden Ball as the tournament's best player; he was directly involved in 11 of the 13 goals that Toronto FC scored in the competition, and notched four goals and three assists in eight appearances, which also made him the joint top-scorer of the tournament alongside teammate and Golden Boot winner Jonathan Osorio. On 16 May, Giovinco was fined an undisclosed amount by the MLS Disciplinary Committee for failing to leave the field in a timely and orderly manner after receiving a red card in a league loss away to the New England Revolution on 12 May. On 15 August, Giovinco scored a goal and assisted two more in a 5–2 home win over Vancouver Whitecaps to win the 2018 Canadian Championship 7–4 on aggregate. Reigning MLS Cup champions Toronto FC failed to qualify for the playoffs after a 2–1 home loss against the Vancouver Whitecaps on 6 October 2018, with three games left to play in the season. Giovinco finished the 2018 MLS campaign with a goal in a 4–1 home win over Atlanta in the final match of the regular season on 28 October.

After negotiations with Toronto fell through during the off-season, on 30 January 2019, Giovinco bid the club farewell with a post on Instagram:

"As I have always maintained, I was hoping to renew my contract and finish my playing career in a city that feels like home... Unfortunately, this desire of ours has clashed with a change in direction with current TFC management. For the two years I have been seeking to extend my contract however management was reluctant... They may say I left for a more lucrative deal, but this is not the case... After having grown the brand and elevating the overall reputation of TFC both at home and abroad, it seems I no longer serve a purpose. I would have accepted less to stay in Toronto. Therefore, I reluctantly announce that my tenure as a TFC player has come to an end... With me I bring beautiful memories. Toronto – the 6ix – you are and will always remain in my heart. Thank you for everything you have taught me about myself and about life. I love you Toronto!"

— Giovinco on his time as a Toronto FC player

=== Al Hilal ===
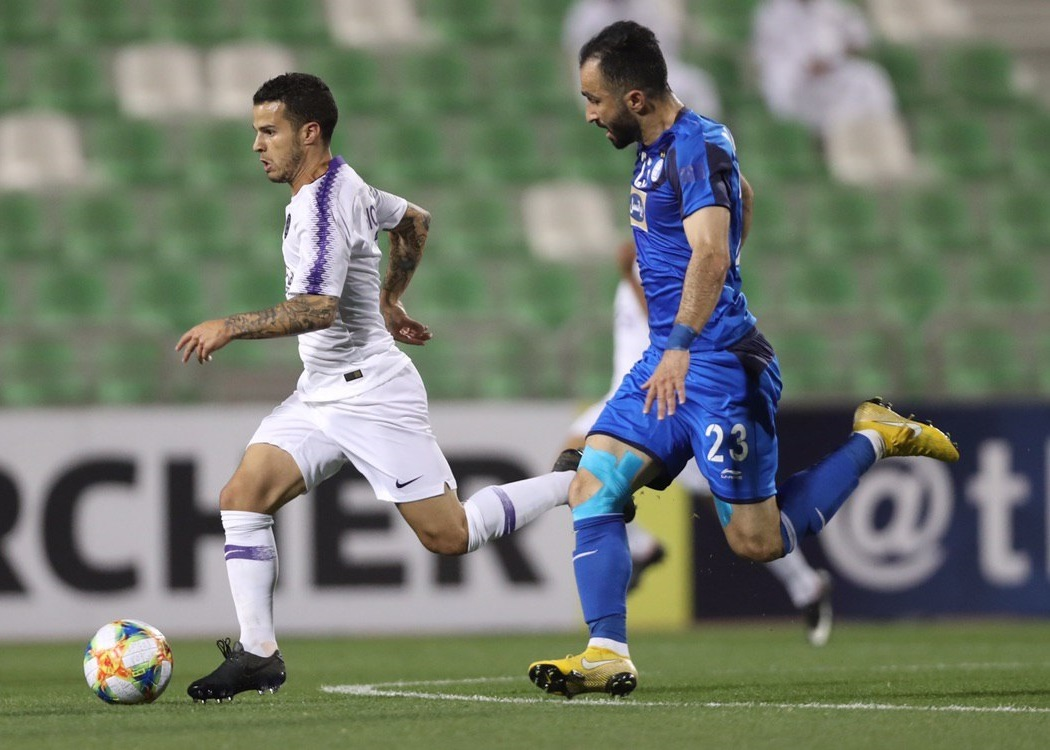
Giovinco (left) playing for Al Hilal in 2019

On 30 January 2019, Toronto FC sold Giovinco to Saudi Arabian club Al Hilal for an undisclosed fee. On 12 February 2019, Giovinco scored on his debut with the club, his club's third goal of a 4–1 home win over Al-Qadsiah. On 23 April, he scored his first AFC Champions League goal, the only goal in a 1–0 home win over Esteghlal. He is one of very few players to have now scored in three different club continental competitions in his career (UEFA Champions League, CONCACAF Champions League, and AFC Champions League).

On 17 September, he scored in a 3–1 home win over Al-Ittihad, which enabled Al Hilal to progress to the semi-finals of the AFC Champions League. On 1 October, in the first leg of the semi-finals of the competition, he assisted Ali Al-Bulaihi's goal in a 4–1 away win over Al Sadd. In the second leg, on 22 October, he set up Bafétimbi Gomis's goal in a 4–2 home defeat, which saw Al Hilal advance to the final of the competition 6–5 on aggregate. In the second leg of the 2019 AFC Champions League Final on 24 November, Giovinco assisted Salem Al-Dawsari's opening goal in an eventual 2–0 away win over Urawa Red Diamonds, which saw Al Hilal win the title with a 3–0 aggregate victory; the title also allowed the team to qualify for the 2019 FIFA Club World Cup. Giovinco started in the FIFA Club World Cup third-place play-off against Monterrey on 21 December; following a 2–2 draw after regulation time, he scored Al Hilal's second spot kick in the resulting shoot-out, although the former side ultimately won the match 4–3 on penalties.

=== Sampdoria ===
In January 2022, Giovinco joined the training camp for former club Toronto FC. However, on 8 February 2022, Giovinco signed with Sampdoria, a short-term contract until the end of June, as a replacement for the injured Manolo Gabbiadini.

== International career ==
=== Youth career ===
Giovinco represented Italy at every youth category from the under-16 level onwards. He was called up to the Italy under-21 side by head coach Pierluigi Casiraghi to make his U21 debut in the 2009 European Championship opening qualifier on 1 June 2007, and helped in their 4–0 defeat of Albania.

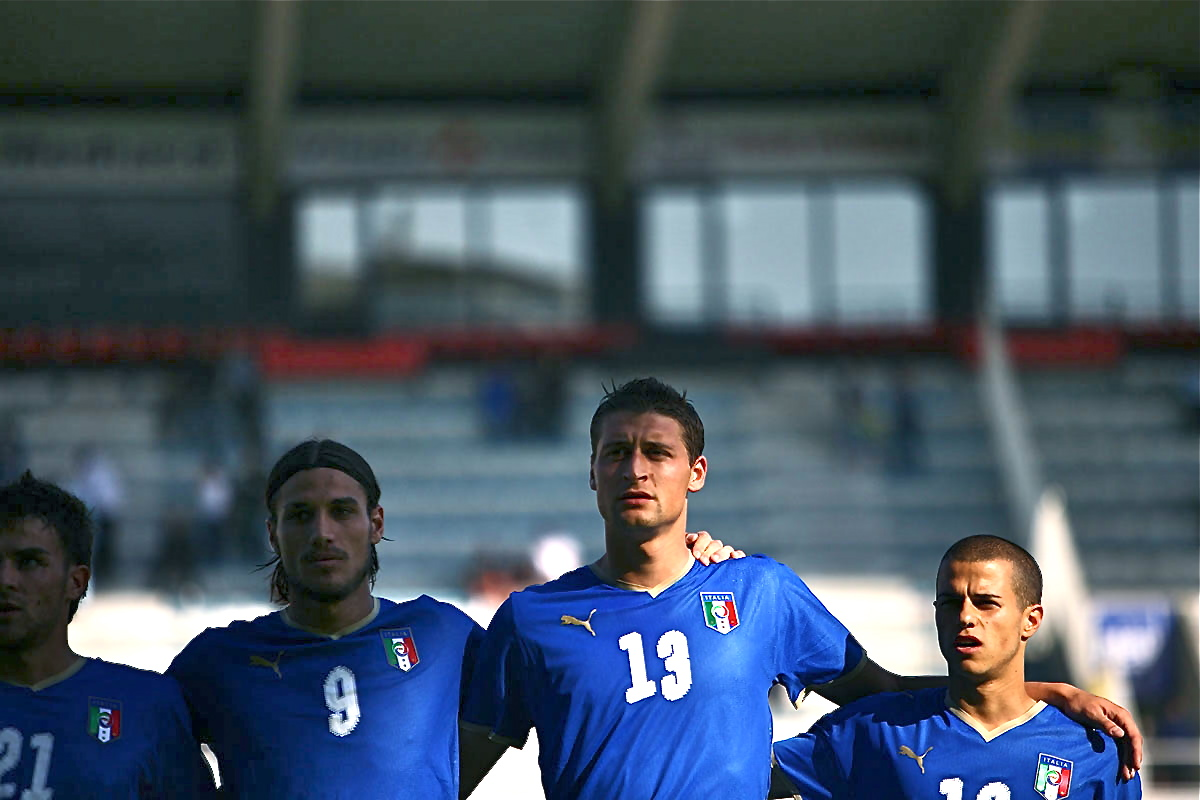
Giovinco (furthest right) lining up for Italy under-21s at the 2008 Toulon Tournament

Giovinco also played at the 2008 Toulon Tournament, where he appeared in all five matches, and was voted the most valuable player of the competition, scoring two goals in the opening game against the Ivory Coast, and netting the winning penalty in the semi-final shoot-out against Japan. Italy ultimately won the competition, defeating Chile 1–0 in the final. That summer, Giovinco, alongside Juventus teammates Claudio Marchisio and Paolo De Ceglie, were named in the Italy squad for the 2008 Summer Olympics in Beijing, China. On 7 August 2008, he scored the opening goal in a 3–0 win against Honduras in the first match of the competition, where he struck the ball from outside of the box with his weaker left foot; Italy were eliminated in the quarter-finals of the competition, following a 3–2 loss to Belgium on 16 August.

In the summer of 2009, Giovinco was called up to the under-21 side for the European Championship in Sweden, after playing a part in their successful qualifying campaign. Giovinco started in every single match at the tournament, but Italy lost to eventual winners Germany 1–0 in a tightly contested semi-final. Due to his performances throughout the European Championship, he was named to the Team of the Tournament, and was also included in the list of the top ten players of the competition.

=== Senior debut, Euro 2012 and 2013 Confederations Cup ===
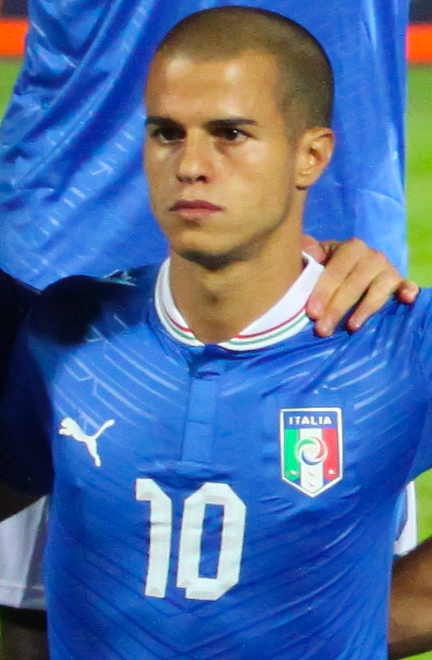
Giovinco lining up for Italy in 2012

Giovinco was called up for international duty for the first time in nearly two years while on loan at Parma, earning his first senior call-up for Italy on 6 February 2011; he made his Italy senior team debut on 9 February, in a friendly match against Germany in Dortmund, which ended in a 1–1 draw, coming on as a second-half substitute for Stefano Mauri. In his second international appearance against Ukraine, Giovinco provided an assist from a back-heel for Alessandro Matri's goal as Italy won the match 2–0 in Kyiv. After some promising substitute appearances, manager Cesare Prandelli stated that he would give Giovinco his full international debut as a starter alongside Antonio Cassano, which came later that year on 11 October, in a 3–0 home win over Northern Ireland in a European qualifier.

Giovinco was named part of Italy's 23-man squad for UEFA Euro 2012. He appeared as a substitute in the two opening group matches of the tournament against Spain and Croatia, almost assisting a goal against Spain in the opening match, as the earlier goalscorer Antonio Di Natale put his lobbed pass over the bar. Italy finished as runners-up of the tournament after losing 4–0 to Spain in the final.

Giovinco started in the first game of Italy's 2014 FIFA World Cup qualification campaign against Bulgaria in Sofia, wearing the number 10 jersey; the match ended in a 2–2 draw. He scored his first goal for Italy in their 2013 FIFA Confederations Cup group stage match against Japan, wearing the number 10 shirt; in addition to scoring the match-winning goal, he also helped to win a penalty, which was converted by Mario Balotelli, and thus ensured a 4–3 win, which allowed Italy to progress to the semi-finals of the competition for the first time in their history. In the semi-finals, Giovinco came on during the second half of extra time; the match ended 0–0 and went to penalties as Giovinco netted his spot kick for Italy, however, Spain won 7–6 due to Leonardo Bonucci's miss. Italy subsequently won the bronze medal match against Uruguay, also on penalties, after the match had ended 2–2 after extra time. Due to the lack of playing time during the 2013–14 season, Giovinco missed out on the 2014 World Cup and was not named in the provisional nor the final squad.

=== Euro 2016 and 2018 World Cup ===
In October 2014, Giovinco was called up by the new Italy manager, and his former Juventus manager, Antonio Conte, for an UEFA Euro 2016 qualifying match against Azerbaijan in Palermo, which Italy won 2–1 on 10 October. Giovinco came on during the second half, and he helped set up Giorgio Chiellini's second, match-winning goal, also hitting the cross-bar towards the end of the match, from a strike outside the area, after an individual dribbling run.

Following his strong performances for MLS side Toronto FC, Giovinco was called up to the national team once again in August 2015 for Italy's Euro 2016 qualifying matches against Malta and Bulgaria in September, and was set to become the first MLS player to represent Italy. He was ultimately ruled out of both matches after sustaining an adductor injury against Montreal Impact, and New York City FC's Andrea Pirlo became the first MLS player to play for Italy, during the same qualifiers. In October 2015, he was called up in the Italy national team for the UEFA Euro 2016 qualifiers against Azerbaijan and Norway on 10 and 13 October. He made a substitute appearance in Italy's 3–1 away win over Azerbaijan, which guaranteed the Italians a place at Euro 2016; he came on in the 79th minute and later hit the cross-bar from a free kick after being fouled by Badavi Guseynov, who was subsequently sent off. On 13 October, he came off of the bench once again and was involved in both goals as Italy came from behind to defeat Norway 2–1 in Rome, and top their group.

On 23 May 2016, Giovinco, along with fellow MLS compatriot Pirlo, was left off of Conte's 30-player shortlist for Italy's Euro 2016 squad. Regarding their omission, Conte commented in a press conference, "When you make a certain choice and go to play in certain leagues, you do so taking it into account that they could pay the consequences from a footballing viewpoint". In response to his omission, Giovinco stated, "I was upset. I need to keep improving so I can find my place back on the national team; I've said before, the league is continuing to grow and it's a beautiful league."

Under Conte's successor, Gian Piero Ventura, Giovinco was once again omitted from Italy's team, both for the 2018 World Cup qualifiers and for friendlies, in spite of his club form for Toronto FC in the MLS; when asked about the omissions of Giovinco and Domenico Criscito from his squad, Ventura commented: "Giovinco is a different story. I have done everything to help him but the reality is that he plays in a league [the MLS] that doesn't count for much, and the number of goals he scores is less important because with the quality he has got, he is bound to make a difference in that league. The problem is that if you play in that type of league, and you get used to playing in that type of league, it becomes a problem of mentality. Criscito, on the other hand, is a great player, I've seen him grow. The problem is that he has to fight to rediscover his spark and he needs that because he is just a little behind. The problem with Giovinco is the same. How long would it take to get him to show that spark?" Italy failed to qualify for the World Cup for the first time in 60 years, with Giovinco's agent claiming that the team should have selected him.

=== 2018–19 Nations League ===
On 5 October 2018, Giovinco was called up, for the first time in three years, by new manager Roberto Mancini for a friendly match on 10 October against Ukraine and a UEFA Nations League match against Poland on 14 October, however, he was an unused substitute for both matches.

== After football ==
On 5 October 2024, Giovinco became the Special Advisor and Club Ambassador for Toronto FC.

== Player profile ==
=== Style of play ===
Giovinco was a small, quick, technically gifted, and agile player, with noted dribbling skills, balance, acceleration, and excellent ball control; these characteristics allowed him to beat opponents, hold up the ball with his back to goal or in tight spaces, and create space for teammates, despite his lack of strong physical attributes. Capable of scoring goals, he was also adept at creating chances for his teammates, possessing good link-up along with notable playmaking skills, and was known for his vision, creativity, and passing and striking ability with either foot, despite being naturally right footed. Furthermore, he was highly regarded for his ability to bend the ball, as well as his accuracy and ball delivery from free kicks, and was considered to be a set piece specialist in the media, as many of his goals had come from dead ball situations; he was also effective at scoring from penalties.

Due to his short stature, dynamic abilities and pace, Giovinco acquired the nickname formica atomica ("atomic ant", after the eponymous Hanna-Barbera character) in his youth. A versatile attacker, Giovinco was capable of playing in several offensive positions, and was usually deployed in a free role as a second striker, behind or off of another forward, although was able to play as a winger, on either flank, or in a deeper playmaking role in the centre of the pitch, as a creative attacking midfielder. He was also sometimes used in a more offensive, central role, as a main striker, or even as a false 9.

=== Reception ===
Although Giovinco was considered to be one of the most promising and talented upcoming players in Italian football in his youth, he was initially criticised in the Italian media for failing to live up to his potential, in particular after moving to the MLS in the prime years of his career; several of his club's managers also left him out of the first team due to his diminutive size, as they felt he was too small and light to succeed at the highest levels of European football against more physical defenders. Regarding the impact of his transfer to Toronto FC in 2015, Adam Digby commented: "Sebastian Giovinco may not be the biggest star, but his signing represents a coup for both Toronto and MLS as a whole, one which could prove hugely beneficial for all concerned." Indeed, several pundits, such as Joe Prince–Wright of NBC Sports and Joe Tansey of Bleacher Report, believed that Giovinco's move could lead to more established players in European leagues moving to the MLS in their prime, while in the past, most of them had joined the league in their 30s, at the end of their careers. In 2015, Giovinco was named one of the 100 best footballers in the world by The Guardian, FourFourTwo, and L'Équipe. In 2019, Josha Kloke of The Athletic described Giovinco as "the best player in franchise history," upon his departure from Toronto FC that year. In 2020, Major League Soccer named him among the 25 greatest players in league history.

== Personal life ==
In May 2013, Sebastian and his partner Sharj Milano celebrated the birth of their first child, Jacopo; the couple have been in a relationship since 2007. Their daughter Alma was born in Toronto in August 2016.

Giovinco features in EA Sports' FIFA video game series; he appeared on the cover of the MLS custom edition of FIFA 16.

Giovinco has made Toronto his adopted home, having played for TFC. In 2022, Giovinco joined Juventus' Toronto Academy as part of their coaching staff.

== Career statistics ==
=== Club ===
Appearances and goals by club, season and competition
Club	Season	League			National cup (Note: Includes Coppa Italia, Canadian Championship, King's Cup)		Continental		Other		Total	
Club	Season	Division	Apps	Goals	Apps	Goals	Apps	Goals	Apps	Goals	Apps	Goals
Juventus	2006–07	Serie B	3	0	0	0	—		—		3	0
Juventus	2008–09	Serie A	19	2	3	1	5 (Note: Appearances in UEFA Champions League)	0	—		27	3
Juventus	2009–10	Serie A	15	1	0	0	4	0	—		19	1
Juventus	2012–13	Serie A	31	7	3	2	7	2	1 (Note: Appearance in Supercoppa Italiana)	0	42	11
Juventus	2013–14	Serie A	17	2	2	1	11 (Note: Four appearances in UEFA Champions League, seven appearances in UEFA Europa League)	0	—		30	3
Juventus	2014–15	Serie A	7	0	1	2	3	0	—		11	2
Juventus	Total		92	12	9	6	30	2	1	0	132	20
Empoli (loan)	2007–08	Serie A	35	6	1	0	1 (Note: Appearance in UEFA Cup)	0	—		37	6
Parma (loan)	2010–11	Serie A	30	7	2	0	—		—		32	7
Parma (loan)	2011–12	Serie A	36	15	2	1	—		—		38	16
Parma (loan)	Total		66	22	4	1	—		—		70	23
Toronto FC	2015	MLS	33	22	1	1	—		1 (Note: Appearance(s) in MLS Cup playoffs)	0	35	23
Toronto FC	2016	MLS	28	17	3	1	—		6	4	37	22
Toronto FC	2017	MLS	25	16	3	3	—		4	1	32	20
Toronto FC	2018	MLS	28	13	1	1	8 (Note: Appearances in CONCACAF Champions League)	4	1 (Note: Appearance in Campeones Cup)	0	38	18
Toronto FC	Total		114	68	8	6	8	4	12	5	142	83
Al Hilal	2018–19	Saudi Pro League	10	4	2	0	5 (Note: Appearances in AFC Champions League)	1	0	0	17	5
Al Hilal	2019–20	Saudi Pro League	26	7	4	1	12	2	2 (Note: Appearances in FIFA Club World Cup)	0	44	10
Al Hilal	2020–21	Saudi Pro League	21	1	0	0	0	0	1 (Note: Appearance in Saudi Super Cup)	0	22	1
Al Hilal	Total		57	12	6	1	17	3	3	0	83	16
Sampdoria	2021–22	Serie A	2	0	—		—		—		2	0
Career total			366	120	28	14	56	9	16	5	466	148

=== International ===
Appearances and goals by national team and year
National team	Year	Apps	Goals
Italy	2011	6	0
Italy	2012	8	0
Italy	2013	3	1
Italy	2014	4	0
Italy	2015	2	0
Total		23	1

Scores and results list Italy's goal tally first, score column indicates score after each Giovinco goal.

List of international goals scored by Sebastian Giovinco
No.	Date	Venue	Opponent	Score	Result	Competition
1	19 June 2013	Arena Pernambuco, Recife, Brazil	Japan	4–3	4–3	2013 FIFA Confederations Cup

== Honours ==
Juventus Primavera

- Torneo di Viareggio: 2005
- Campionato Nazionale Primavera: 2005–06
- Supercoppa Primavera: 2006
- Coppa Italia Primavera: 2007

Juventus

- Serie A: 2012–13, 2013–14
- Serie B: 2006–07
- Supercoppa Italiana: 2012, 2013

Toronto FC

- MLS Cup: 2017
- Eastern Conference Championship playoffs: 2016, 2017
- Supporters' Shield: 2017
- Canadian Championship: 2016, 2017, 2018

Al Hilal

- Saudi Pro League: 2019–20, 2020–21
- King's Cup: 2019–20
- AFC Champions League: 2019

Italy

- UEFA European Championship runner-up: 2012
- FIFA Confederations Cup third place: 2013

Italy U21

- Toulon Tournament: 2008

Individual

- Campionato Nazionale Primavera Best Player: 2005–06
- Toulon Tournament Player of the Tournament: 2008
- UEFA European Under-21 Championship Team of the Tournament: 2009
- MLS All-Star: 2015, 2016, 2017, 2018
- MLS Best XI: 2015, 2016, 2017
- MLS MVP Award: 2015
- MLS Golden Boot: 2015
- MLS top assist provider: 2015
- MLS Newcomer of the Year Award: 2015
- MLS Player of the Month: July 2015, August 2015
- Best MLS Player ESPY Award: 2016
- George Gross Memorial Trophy: 2017
- Canadian Championship top scorer: 2017
- Audi Player Index Award: 2016, 2017
- Red Patch Boys Player of the Year: 2015, 2016
- CONCACAF Champions League Golden Ball: 2018
- CONCACAF Champions League Best XI: 2018
- CONCACAF Men's Best XI: 2018
- CONCACAF Men's Player of the Year: 2018 (third place)
- AFC Champions League Fans' Best XI: 2019
- Saudi Pro League Player of the Month: January 2020

Records

- Second-most combined goals and assists in a single MLS season: 38 (22 goals and 16 assists in 2015)
- First MLS player to lead the league in goals and assists in the same season: 2015
- First MLS player to record consecutive seasons of 30+ combined goals and assists: 2015, 2016
- First MLS player to record at least 20 goals and 10 assists in a single regular season: 2015 (22 goals and 16 assists in total)
- Most free kick goals in a single MLS regular season: 6 (2017)
- MLS all-time regular season leading goalscorer from free kicks: 13
- MLS all-time leading goalscorer from free kicks: 14
- Toronto FC all-time leading goalscorer: 83 goals
- Toronto FC all-time leading goalscorer in MLS: 68 goals
- Most league goals for Toronto FC in a season: 22 (2015)
- Most goals for Toronto FC in a season (all competitions): 23 (2015)
- Most goals for Toronto FC in a league match: 3 (shared)
- Second-fastest goal for Toronto FC: 57 seconds
- Fastest player to reach 100 combined goals and assists in MLS history: 58 goals and 42 assists in 95 games
