= Keith Hutchinson =

English footballer

Personal information
- Full name: Keith anthony Hutchinson
- Date of birth: 7 September 1920
- Place of birth: South Shields, England
- Date of death: April 1986 (aged 65)
- Place of death: Southport, England
- Position: Full back

Senior career*
Years	Team	Apps	(Gls)
1946–1949	Darlington	31	(0)
1949–19??	Stockton		
- * Club domestic league appearances and goals

Keith Graham Hutchinson (7 September 1920 – April 1986) was an English footballer who made 31 appearances in the Football League playing as a full back for Darlington in the 1940s. He went on to play non-league football for Stockton.
