= Stefano Dicuonzo =

Italian footballer (born 1985)

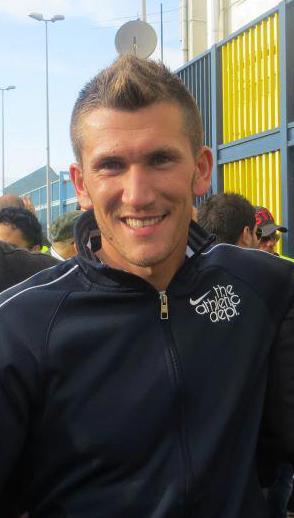

Personal information
- Date of birth: 19 September 1985 (age 41)
- Place of birth: Turin, Italy
- Height: 1.74 m (5 ft 9 in)
- Position: Left back

Youth career
- 2002–2009: Juventus

Senior career*
| Years | Team | Apps | (Gls) |
| 2005–2006 | Juventus | 0 | (0) |
| 2006–2008 | Ravenna | 23 | (1) |
| 2007–2008 | → Pro Sesto (loan) | 7 | (0) |
| 2008–2009 | Pro Patria | 9 | (0) |
| 2009–2010 | Catanzaro | 32 | (1) |
| 2010–2013 | Juve Stabia | 99 | (3) |
| 2013–2014 | Grosseto | 8 | (0) |
| 2014 | Benevento | 11 | (0) |
| 2014–2016 | Pisa | 24 | (0) |
| 2016–2017 | Paganese | 12 | (0) |
| 2017 | Racing Roma | 0 | (0) |
| 2017 | Isola Capo Rizzuto | 6 | (0) |
| 2018 | Roccella | 11 | (0) |
| 2019 | Anzio | 2 | (0) |
| Total | | 244 | (5) |
- * Club domestic league appearances and goals

Stefano Dicuonzo (or spelled as Di Cuonzo; born 19 September 1985) is an Italian former footballer who plays as a left back.

== Club career ==
=== Juventus ===
Dicuonzo started his career in the Juventus FC youth system in 1996. He eventually worked his way up to the Primavera youth squad for the 2005–2006 season, and soon after, he graduated the youth system. During the 2005–06 Serie A season, in which Juventus FC won their second consecutive Scudetto (stripped by the 2006 Italian football scandal), Di Cuonzo was often called up to the first team by, then coach, Fabio Capello, although he never made his debut. He spent the 2006 summer training with the first team and made his Juventus debut in August 2006 in a friendly fixture. This would eventually be his only career appearance for Juventus thus far in his career.

=== Ravenna ===
Following his Juventus debut, Dicuonzo was transferred to Serie C1 side, Ravenna Calcio in a co-ownership deal. He went on to make 23 league appearances that season, scoring one goal, and also helping his side to Serie B promotion. He was also loaned back to the third tier for Pro Sesto on 23 July 2007. The loan to Pro Sesto proved very unsuccessful for the fullback, as his season was heavily hampered by injury, which limited the player to just 7 appearances in the league.

In June 2008, his co-ownership was resolved in favor of Juventus, and so he returned to the club on 1 July.

=== Lega Pro ===
Upon returning to Juventus in 2008, he was sold on a co-ownership deal by Lega Pro Prima Divisione (ex-Serie C1) team Pro Patria, in attempt to revive his career after the injury setback. Dicuonzo managed just 9 league appearances again during the 2008–09 Lega Pro season, again faltering to injury.

In July 2009 he officially transferred to F.C. Catanzaro in the Lega Pro Seconda Divisione. Dicuonzo established himself as a first team starter, and had a successful season, scoring 1 goal in 33 league appearances.

=== S.S. Juve Stabia ===
On 31 August 2010 he completed a deadline day transfer to Lega Pro Prima Divisione club S.S. Juve Stabia. Dicuonzo established himself as a first team regular once more with le vespe and would go on to make 26 league appearances in his first season with the club, scoring a single goal, and also helping his club to Serie B promotion for the first time in 60 years. Dicuonzo continued to be an integral part of the club's revival, and managed to appear in 40 out of 42 league matches during the 2011–12 Serie B campaign. The club managed to finish in an impressive 9th place in the league table on 57 points, despite beginning the season with a 4-point penalty.

=== Grosseto ===
In summer 2013 he was signed by Grosseto. He was released by the club on 10 January 2014.
