= 2010 Torneo di Viareggio =

2010 Viareggio Cup World Football Tournament Coppa Carnevale
62° Torneo di Viareggio

Tournament details
- Host country: Italy
- City: Viareggio
- Dates: February 1, 2010 - February 15, 2010
- Teams: 48

Final positions
- Champions: (Italy) Juventus
- Runners-up: (Italy) Empoli

Tournament statistics
- Matches played: 87
- Goals scored: 255 (2.93 per match)
- Top scorer: (Italy) Ciro Immobile (10)
- Best player: (Italy) Ciro Immobile

The 2010 winners of the Torneo di Viareggio (in English, the Viareggio Tournament, officially the Viareggio Cup World Football Tournament Coppa Carnevale), the annual youth football tournament held in Viareggio, Tuscany, are listed below.

== Format ==
The 48 teams are seeded in 12 pools, split up into 6-pool groups. Each team from a pool meets the others in a single tie. The winning club from each pool and two best runners-up from both group A and group B progress to the final knockout stage. All matches in the final rounds are single tie. The Round of 16 after envisions penalties and no extra time, while the rest of the final round matches include 30 minutes extra time and penalties to be played if the draw between teams still holds.

== Participating teams ==
Italian teams

- (Italy) Atalanta
- (Italy) Bari
- (Italy) Bologna
- (Italy) Cesena
- (Italy) Cisco Roma
- (Italy) Empoli
- (Italy) Fiorentina
- (Italy) Genoa
- (Italy) Inter Milan
- (Italy) Juventus
- (Italy) Lazio
- (Italy) Livorno
- (Italy) Mantova
- (Italy) Milan
- (Italy) Napoli
- (Italy) Olbia
- (Italy) Palermo
- (Italy) Parma
- (Italy) Pergocrema
- (Italy) Serie D Representatives
- (Italy) Reggina
- (Italy) Roma
- (Italy) Sambenedettese
- (Italy) Sampdoria
- (Italy) Sassuolo
- (Italy) Siena
- (Italy) Torino
- (Italy) Viareggio
- (Italy) Vicenza

European teams

- (Belgium) Anderlecht
- (North Macedonia) Belasica
- (Czech Republic) Dukla Prague
- (Serbia) Jedinstvo Ub
- (Hungary) Kaposvári Rákóczi
- (Poland) Legia Warszawa
- (Russia) Spartak Moscow
- (Latvia) Ventspils

Asian teams

- (Israel) Maccabi Haifa
- (Uzbekistan) Paxtakor

African Team

- (Sierra Leone) Kallon

American teams

- (Brazil) Leme Football Club
- (United States) L.I.A.C. of New York
- (Mexico) Chivas Guadalajara
- (Paraguay) Guaraní Asunción
- (Brazil) Grêmio
- (Paraguay) Nacional Asunción
- (Brazil) Club Sol do Campo Grande

Oceanian teams

- (Australia) APIA Leichhardt

== Group stage ==
=== Group A ===
==== Pool 1 ====
Team	Pts	Pld	W	D	L	GF	GA
(Italy) Juventus	9	3	3	0	0	11	0
(Poland) Legia Warszawa	4	3	1	1	1	5	5
(Italy) Vicenza	3	3	1	0	2	5	10
(Italy) Livorno	1	3	0	1	2	3	9

==== Pool 2 ====
Team	Pts	Pld	W	D	L	GF	GA
(Italy) Internazionale	9	3	3	0	0	9	0
(Italy) Serie D Representatives	6	3	2	0	1	8	1
(Australia) APIA Leichhardt Tigers	3	3	1	0	2	3	9
(Serbia) Jedinstvo Ub	0	3	0	0	3	2	12

==== Pool 3 ====
Team	Pts	Pld	W	D	L	GF	GA
(Italy) Torino	9	3	3	0	0	6	1
(Italy) Bologna	4	3	1	1	1	2	3
(Israel) Maccabi Haifa	4	3	1	1	1	5	6
(United States) L.I.A.C. of New York	0	3	0	0	3	2	5

==== Pool 4 ====
Team	Pts	Pld	W	D	L	GF	GA
(Paraguay) Club Nacional	6	3	2	0	1	4	2
(Italy) Siena	5	3	1	2	0	3	1
(Brazil) Grêmio	4	3	1	1	1	3	2
(Italy) Sampdoria	1	3	0	1	2	2	7

==== Pool 5 ====
Team	Pts	Pld	W	D	L	GF	GA
(Italy) Empoli	9	3	3	0	0	14	2
(Italy) Mantova	4	3	1	1	1	4	2
(Hungary) Kaposvári Rákóczi	4	3	1	1	1	6	5
(Italy) Olbia	0	3	0	0	3	0	15

==== Pool 6 ====
Team	Pts	Pld	W	D	L	GF	GA
(Italy) Palermo	7	3	2	1	0	7	0
(Italy) Sassuolo	6	3	2	0	1	4	7
(Italy) Pergocrema	3	3	1	0	2	3	5
(Russia) Spartak Moscow	1	3	0	1	2	1	3

=== Group B ===
==== Pool 7 ====
Team	Pts	Pld	W	D	L	GF	GA
(Italy) Fiorentina	7	3	2	1	0	6	1
(Italy) Cesena	7	3	2	1	0	5	2
(Italy) Sambenedettese	3	3	1	0	2	2	6
(North Macedonia) Belasica	0	3	0	0	3	0	4

==== Pool 8 ====
Team	Pts	Pld	W	D	L	GF	GA
(Italy) Reggina	9	3	3	0	0	5	1
(Italy) Roma	6	3	2	0	1	10	5
(Italy) Cisco Roma	3	3	1	0	2	4	6
(Latvia) Ventspils	0	3	0	0	3	2	9

==== Pool 9 ====
Team	Pts	Pld	W	D	L	GF	GA
(Italy) Milan	6	3	2	0	1	11	3
(Brazil) Leme Futebol Clube	6	3	2	0	1	6	6
(Paraguay) Club Guaraní	6	3	2	0	1	7	5
(Italy) Esperia Viareggio	0	3	0	0	3	1	11

==== Pool 10 ====
Team	Pts	Pld	W	D	L	GF	GA
(Italy) Genoa	9	3	3	0	0	5	1
(Italy) Bari	6	3	2	0	1	6	4
(Czech Republic) Dukla Prague	3	3	1	0	2	6	5
(Paraguay) Club Sol De Campo Grande	0	3	0	0	3	4	11

==== Pool 11 ====
Team	Pts	Pld	W	D	L	GF	GA
(Italy) Atalanta	7	3	2	1	0	4	2
(Italy) Lazio	4	3	1	1	1	3	1
(Belgium) Anderlecht	4	3	1	1	1	5	5
(Uzbekistan) Pakhtakor Tashkent	1	3	0	1	2	2	6

==== Pool 12 ====
Team	Pts	Pld	W	D	L	GF	GA
(Italy) Napoli	7	3	2	1	0	6	3
(Italy) Parma	6	3	2	0	1	4	4
(Mexico) Chivas Guadalajara	4	3	1	1	1	5	2
(Sierra Leone) Kallon	0	3	0	0	2	4	10

== Knockout stage ==
Round of 16
9 February (15:00 CET)
(Italy) Napoli	1 (4)
(Italy) Sassuolo	1 (5)
9 February (15:00 CET)
(Italy) Juventus	3
(Italy) Cesena	1
9 February (15:00 CET)
(Italy) Internazionale	0 (3)
(Italy) Atalanta	0 (5)
9 February (15:00 CET)
(Italy) Reggina	1 (4)
(Italy) Palermo	1 (5)
9 February (15:00 CET)
(Italy) Torino	1
(Italy) Milan	0
9 February (15:00 CET)
(Italy) Genoa	1
(Italy) Serie D Rep.	2
9 February (15:00 CET)
(Italy) Fiorentina	2 (5)
(Paraguay) Club Nacional	2 (4)
9 February (17:00 CET)
(Italy) Empoli	0 (3)
(Italy) Roma	0 (1)

Quarter-finals
11 February (17:00 CET)
(Italy) Sassuolo	0
(Italy) Juventus	1
11 February (15:00 CET)
(Italy) Atalanta	1
(Italy) Palermo	0
11 February (15:00 CET)
(Italy) Torino	0 (1)
(Italy) Serie D Rep.	0 (3)
11 February (15:00 CET)
(Italy) Fiorentina	1
(Italy) Empoli	2

Semi-finals
13 February (15:00 CET)
(Italy) Juventus	2
(Italy) Atalanta	0
13 February (17:00 CET)
(Italy) Serie D Rep.	0 (2)
(Italy) Empoli	0 (4)

Final
15 February (15:00 CET)
(Italy) Juventus	4
(Italy) Empoli	2

== Champions ==
Torneo di Viareggio 2010 Champions

F.C. Juventus
7th time

== Top goalscorers ==
10 goals

- (Italy) Ciro Immobile ( (Italy) Juventus)

6 goals

- (Italy) Giacomo Beretta ( (Italy) Milan)

4 goals

- (Italy) Stefano Pettinari ( (Italy) Roma)
- (Brazil) André Amaral ( (Brazil) Leme Futebol Clube)
- (Georgia (country)) Irakli Shekiladze ( (Italy) Empoli)
- (Italy) Luca Belcastro ( (Italy) Juventus)

3 goals

- (Italy) Gianmario Comi ( (Italy) Torino)
- (Italy) Marco Giovio ( (Italy) Palermo)
- (Nigeria) Jerry Mbakogu ( (Italy) Palermo)
- (Italy) Manuel Fischnaller ( (Italy) Juventus)
- (Italy) Leonardo D'Angelo ( (Italy) Serie D Representatives)
- (Mexico) Mischel Vazquez ( (Mexico) Chivas Guadalajara)
- (Italy) Vincenzo Pisani ( (Italy) Bari)
- (Sierra Leone) Mohamed Bangura ( (Sierra Leone) Kallon)
- (Romania) Denis Alibec ( (Italy) Internazionale)
- (Italy) Benito Nicolas Viola ( (Italy) Reggina)
- (Italy) Rivolino Gavoci ( (Italy) Cesena)
- (Italy) Manuel Pucciarelli ( (Italy) Empoli)

2 goals

- 37 Players
