= Manuel Fischnaller =

Italian professional footballer

Personal information
- Date of birth: 20 July 1991 (age 35)
- Place of birth: Bolzano, Italy
- Height: 1.77 m (5 ft 9 1/2 in)
- Position: Forward

Team information
- Current team: Ravenna
- Number: 23

Youth career
- 2000–2004: F.C. Neugries
- 2004–2008: Südtirol
- 2010: Juventus

Senior career*
Years	Team	Apps	(Gls)
2008–2012	Südtirol	91	(15)
2010	→ Juventus (loan)	0	(0)
2012–2014	Reggina	61	(7)
2014–2015	Südtirol	36	(16)
2015–2018	Alessandria	89	(17)
2018–2020	Catanzaro	54	(18)
2020–2022	Südtirol	55	(9)
2022–2023	Fermana	34	(13)
2023–2025	Torres	72	(25)
2025–2026	Trapani	17	(9)
2026–	Ravenna	16	(8)

International career
2009–2012	Italy U-20	10	(4)
- * Club domestic league appearances and goals as of 30 April 2026

Manuel Fischnaller (born 20 July 1991) is an Italian professional footballer who plays as a striker for Serie C Group B club Ravenna.

== Club career ==
Fischnaller began his career with F.C. Neugries in 2000, spending four years with the club's youth side, of which his father Alfred was head coach. In 2004 Fischnaller joined Südtirol, graduating from the youth system to join the senior squad in 2008. In a season and a half with the senior side he scored 6 goals in 32 appearances, bringing him to the attention of Juventus FC scouts. On 23 December 2009, it was announced that Serie A's Juventus had signed Fischnaller on loan, with the option to make the transfer permanent at the end of the season. It was also noted that he would remain in the youth ranks of the club, for the time being. The signing was Juventus' first signing of the 2009–10 winter transfer market. Fischnaller returned to Südtirol on 1 July 2010, and in August he signed a new 3-year contract with the club. In July 2012, Fischnaller joined Serie B club Reggina on a four-year deal. In the summer of 2015, he was transferred to Alessandria signing a four-year contract. In the summer of 2018 he signed a two-year contract with Catanzaro. On 25 January 2020 he returned to Südtirol once more, signing a 3.5-year contract.

On 1 September 2022, Fischnaller moved to Fermana on a two-year deal.

== International career ==
Fischnaller was a member of the Italy national under-20 football team, making his debut in a Four-Nations-Championship in November 2008 in Germany.
