= 2008–09 Juventus FC season =

Italian football club season

Juventus
2008–09 season
- President: Giovanni Cobolli Gigli
- Manager: Claudio Ranieri (until 18 May 2009); Ciro Ferrara (caretaker manager)
- Stadium: Stadio Olimpico di Torino
- Serie A: 2nd
- Coppa Italia: Semi-finals
- UEFA Champions League: Round of 16
- Top goalscorer: League: Alessandro Del Piero (13); All: Alessandro Del Piero (21)
- Highest home attendance: 27,419 vs Chelsea (10 March 2009, Champions League)
- Lowest home attendance: 200 vs Atalanta (17 May 2009, Serie A)
- Average home league attendance: 22,396
Home colours	Away colours	Third colours

The 2008–09 season was Juventus Football Club's 111th in existence and 2nd consecutive season in the top flight of Italian football.

== Season review ==
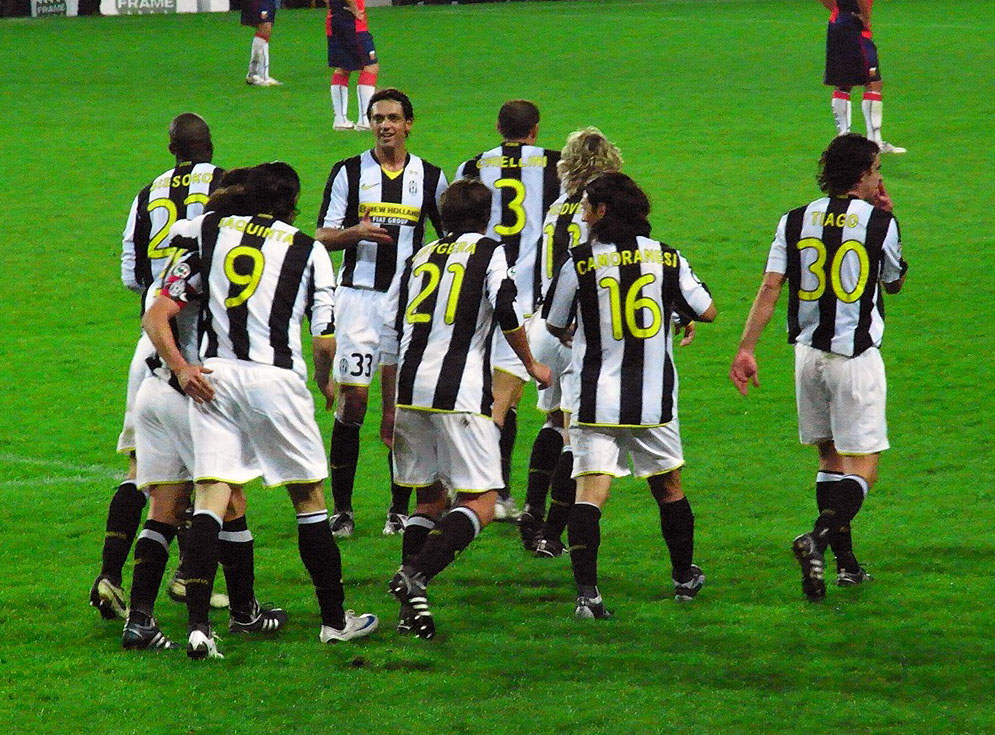
Bianconeri celebrates a goal in the Serie A match against Genoa. Turin, November 13, 2008.

At various points in the season, Juventus looked as though they could challenge rivals Internazionale's stronghold over Serie A, most notably in November 2008 following five successive wins, in late January 2009 after a seven-game unbeaten streak and again in March 2009 after another series of seven games without losing, which included impressive 4–1 successes over Bologna and Roma. Coach Claudio Ranieri, however, seemed to encounter serious problems in motivating his troops with his constant belittling of Juventus' title chances.

After a club record run of seven consecutive league games without a win in April and May, Ranieri was sacked in only his second season at Juventus. This barren run of results also included a 2–1 loss at home to Lazio in the Coppa Italia semi-finals, meaning the Turin side were once more denied the chance to compete for silverware. Juventus legend and former centre back Ciro Ferrara, who was the director of the Youth Sector at that time, was appointed the caretaker manager for the remaining two matches. The wins over Siena and Lazio ensured a second-place finish over AC Milan (based on head-to-head record) after the Rossoneri failed to take advantage of Juve's winless streak and lost 3–2 away at Roma.

In Europe, Juventus began brightly, going unbeaten in their six group games and topping their group. These positive performances saw the Italians beat Spanish champions Real Madrid both home and away. Alessandro Del Piero, who scored a brace at the Santiago Bernabéu just four days before celebrating his 34th birthday, earned himself a standing ovation from the notoriously hostile Madrid crowd.

The knockout stages were much less rejoicing for the Bianconeri. They were knocked out by English club Chelsea who had just changed their manager. Despite battling with ten men in the second leg, Juventus drew the game 2–2, meaning they were eliminated after the 1–0 loss in London.

On 5 June 2009, it was confirmed that Ferrara had been appointed as the full-time manager on a two-year contract.

== Players ==
=== Squad information ===
As of 2 April 2009.

Note: Flags indicate national team as defined under FIFA eligibility rules; some limited exceptions apply. Players may hold more than one non-FIFA nationality.

No.	Pos.	Nation	Player
1	GK	ITA	Gianluigi Buffon (vice-captain)
3	DF	ITA	Giorgio Chiellini
4	DF	SWE	Olof Mellberg
5	DF	FRA	Jonathan Zebina
6	MF	ITA	Cristiano Zanetti
7	MF	BIH	Hasan Salihamidžić
8	FW	BRA	Amauri
9	FW	ITA	Vincenzo Iaquinta
10	FW	ITA	Alessandro Del Piero (captain)
11	MF	CZE	Pavel Nedvěd
12	GK	ITA	Antonio Chimenti
13	GK	AUT	Alexander Manninger
15	DF	CRO	Dario Knežević

No.	Pos.	Nation	Player
16	MF	ITA	Mauro Camoranesi
17	FW	FRA	David Trezeguet
18	MF	DEN	Christian Poulsen
19	MF	ITA	Claudio Marchisio
20	FW	ITA	Sebastian Giovinco
21	DF	CZE	Zdeněk Grygera
22	MF	MLI	Mohamed Sissoko
27	MF	SWE	Albin Ekdal
28	DF	ITA	Cristian Molinaro
29	DF	ITA	Paolo De Ceglie
30	MF	POR	Tiago
32	MF	ITA	Marco Marchionni
33	DF	ITA	Nicola Legrottaglie

=== Reserve squad ===
Note: Flags indicate national team as defined under FIFA eligibility rules; some limited exceptions apply. Players may hold more than one non-FIFA nationality.

No.	Pos.	Nation	Player
31	GK	ITA	Timothy Nocchi
—	GK	ITA	Antonio Piccolo
42	GK	ITA	Carlo Pinsoglio
—	DF	ITA	Raffaele Alcibiade
41	DF	ITA	Lorenzo Ariaudo
—	DF	CIV	Abdoulaye Bamba
38	DF	ITA	Salvatore D'Elia
43	DF	ITA	Andrea De Paola
37	DF	ITA	Marco Duravia
—	DF	ITA	Ivan Mignano
—	DF	ITA	Federico Mirarchi
—	DF	ITA	Simone Serino
36	MF	ITA	Luca Castiglia
45	MF	ESP	Iago Falque

No.	Pos.	Nation	Player
—	MF	ITA	Luca Gerbaudo
44	MF	ITA	Giuseppe Giovinco
—	MF	ITA	Fabrizio Lazzeri
39	MF	ITA	Luca Marrone
—	MF	ITA	Domenico Pirrotta
40	MF	ITA	Fausto Rossi
—	MF	CMR	David Junior Toukam
—	MF	ITA	Carlo Vecchione
—	FW	ITA	Alessio Curcio
47	FW	SOM	Ayub Daud
35	FW	ITA	Simone Esposito
46	FW	ITA	Ciro Immobile
—	FW	ITA	Alberto Libertazzi

=== Youth squad ===
Note: Flags indicate national team as defined under FIFA eligibility rules; some limited exceptions apply. Players may hold more than one non-FIFA nationality.

No.	Pos.	Nation	Player
—	GK	ITA	Marco Bodrito
—	GK	ITA	Timothy Nocchi
—	GK	ITA	Romeo Urbano
—	DF	ITA	Raffaele Alcibiade
—	DF	ITA	Federico Mirarchi
—	DF	ITA	Giacomo Molinaro
—	DF	ITA	Anthony Ricciardi
—	DF	ITA	Simone Serino
—	DF	ITA	Ivan Mignano
—	MF	ITA	Luca Ficarrotta
—	MF	ITA	Luca Gerbaudo

No.	Pos.	Nation	Player
—	MF	ITA	Giuseppe Giovinco
—	MF	ITA	Fabrizio Lazzeri
—	MF	ITA	Alessandro Ntanos
—	MF	ITA	Alessandro Cretazzo
—	MF	ITA	Domenico Pirrotta
—	MF	ITA	Marco Siragusa
—	FW	ITA	Alessio Curcio
—	FW	ITA	Nicola Faralli
—	FW	ITA	Ciro Immobile
—	FW	ITA	Dennis Russo

=== UEFA Champions League squad ===
Note: Flags indicate national team as defined under FIFA eligibility rules; some limited exceptions apply. Players may hold more than one non-FIFA nationality.

No.	Pos.	Nation	Player
1	GK	ITA	Gianluigi Buffon
3	DF	ITA	Giorgio Chiellini
4	DF	SWE	Olof Mellberg
5	DF	FRA	Jonathan Zebina
6	MF	ITA	Cristiano Zanetti
7	MF	BIH	Hasan Salihamidžić
8	FW	BRA	Amauri
9	FW	ITA	Vincenzo Iaquinta
10	FW	ITA	Alessandro Del Piero (captain)
11	MF	CZE	Pavel Nedvěd
12	GK	ITA	Antonio Chimenti
13	GK	AUT	Alexander Manninger
15	DF	CRO	Dario Knežević
16	MF	ITA	Mauro Camoranesi
17	FW	FRA	David Trezeguet (vice-captain)
18	MF	DEN	Christian Poulsen
19	MF	ITA	Claudio Marchisio

No.	Pos.	Nation	Player
20	FW	ITA	Sebastian Giovinco
21	DF	CZE	Zdeněk Grygera
22	MF	MLI	Mohamed Sissoko
28	DF	ITA	Cristian Molinaro
29	DF	ITA	Paolo De Ceglie
30	MF	POR	Tiago
31	GK	ITA	Timothy Nocchi (List B Player)
32	MF	ITA	Marco Marchionni
33	DF	ITA	Nicola Legrottaglie
35	MF	ITA	Simone Esposito (List B Player)
36	MF	ITA	Luca Castiglia (List B Player)
37	DF	ITA	Marco Duravia (List B Player)
38	DF	ITA	Salvatore D'Elia (List B Player)
40	MF	ITA	Fausto Rossi (List B Player)
41	DF	ITA	Lorenzo Ariaudo (List B Player)
42	GK	ITA	Carlo Pinsoglio (List B Player)

== Transfers ==
=== In ===
#	Pos	Player	From	Fee	Date
4	DF	(Sweden) Olof Mellberg	Aston Villa	Free	24-01-2008
27	MF	(Sweden) Albin Ekdal	Brommapojkarna	€600,000	27-05-2008
8	FW	(Brazil) Amauri	Palermo	€22.6 million	03-06-2008
29	DF	(Italy) Paolo De Ceglie	Siena	€3.5 million (co-ownership resolution)	09-06-2008
19	MF	(Italy) Claudio Marchisio	Empoli	Loan return	14-06-2008
20	FW	(Italy) Sebastian Giovinco	Empoli	Loan return	26-06-2008
15	DF	(Croatia) Dario Knežević	Livorno	Loan	30-06-2008
18	MF	(Denmark) Christian Poulsen	Sevilla	€9.75 million	14-07-2008
12	GK	(Italy) Antonio Chimenti	Udinese	Loan	19-07-2008
13	GK	(Austria) Alexander Manninger	Udinese	€1 million	05-08-2008
	MF	(Spain) Iago Falque	Barcelona Atlètic	Free	01-09-2008
	GK	(Bulgaria) Mario Kirev	Slavia Sofia	€800,000	21-01-2009

=== Out ===
#	Pos	Player	To	Fee	Date
23	MF	(Italy) Antonio Nocerino	Palermo	€7.5 million	03-06-2008
	DF	(Italy) Andrea Rossi	Siena	€400,000 (co-ownership resolution)	09-06-2008
	DF	(Italy) Felice Piccolo	Empoli	Undisclosed (co-ownership resolution)	10-06-2008
	MF	(Italy) Manuele Blasi	Napoli	€2.6 million (co-ownership resolution)	13-06-2008
	FW	(Uruguay) Marcelo Zalayeta	Napoli	Renewed co-ownership	13-06-2008
	MF	(Italy) Matteo Paro	Genoa	€2 million (co-ownership resolution)	24-06-2008
	FW	(Paraguay) Tomás Guzmán	Piacenza	Renewed co-ownership	25-06-2008
	MF	(Brazil) Douglas Packer	Siena	€150,000 (co-ownership resolution)	25-06-2008
	DF	(Italy) Pietro Zammuto	Piacenza	Undisclosed (co-ownership resolution)	25-06-2008
	FW	(Italy) Rej Volpato	Bari	Undisclosed (co-ownership)	01-07-2008
	FW	(Italy) Davide Lanzafame	Palermo	€2.5 million (co-ownership)	01-07-2008
	MF	(Italy) Andrè Cuneaz	Mantova	Undisclosed (co-ownership)	03-07-2008
20	FW	(Italy) Raffaele Palladino	Genoa	€5 million (co-ownership)	03-07-2008
	DF	(Italy) Giuseppe Rizza	Livorno	Undisclosed (co-ownership)	07-07-2008
2	DF	(Italy) Alessandro Birindelli	Pisa	Free	21-07-2008
	FW	(Italy) Piergiuseppe Maritato	Fiorentina	Undisclosed	**-07-2008
14	DF	(Portugal) Jorge Andrade	Unattatched	Released	02-04-2009

=== Loaned out ===
#	Pos	Player	To	Start	End
	FW	(Italy) Riccardo Maniero	Bari	27-06-2008	01-07-2009
	MF	(Italy) Raffaele Bianco	Bari	27-06-2008	01-07-2009
	DF	(Italy) Domenico Criscito	Genoa	03-07-2008	01-07-2009
	FW	(Morocco) Oussama Essabr	Vicenza	05-07-2008	01-07-2009
	MF	(Italy) Dario Venitucci	Mantova	09-07-2008	01-07-2009
	MF	(Cuba) Samon Rodríguez	Poggibonsi	22-07-2008	30-01-2009
	GK	(Italy) Alessandro Vono	Livorno	23-07-2008	01-07-2009
	MF	(Uruguay) Rubén Olivera	Genoa	24-07-2008	01-07-2009
12	GK	(Italy) Emanuele Belardi	Udinese	01-08-2008	01-07-2009
	MF	(Argentina) Sergio Almirón	Fiorentina	05-08-2008	01-07-2009
	FW	(Italy) Cristian Pasquato	Empoli	24-08-2008	01-07-2010
	GK	(Bulgaria) Mario Kirev	Grasshopper	24-01-2009	01-07-2009
	MF	(Italy) Dario Venitucci	Avellino	**-01-2009	
	MF	(Cuba) Samon Rodríguez	Alessandria	30-01-2009	01-07-2009

== Pre-season and friendlies ==
=== Goal scorers ===
Position	Nation	Number	Name	Goals
1	(Brazil)	8	Amauri	7
2	(Italy)	9	Vincenzo Iaquinta	4
3	(France)	17	David Trezeguet	2
=	(Italy)	34	Cristian Pasquato	2
5	(Italy)	32	Marco Marchionni	1
=	(Italy)	35	Simone Esposito	1

=== Friendly matches ===
11 July 2008	Juventus	7–1	AC Mezzocorona	Pineta di Pinzolo, Pinzolo
16:00	Amauri 15', 18', 32', 36', 41'; Pasquato 54'; Esposito 60'		D’Acampo 88'

15 July 2008	Juventus	0–1	Piacenza	Stadio Briamasco, Trento
			Simon 29'	Attendance: 3,800

23 July 2008	Brøndby	1–2	Juventus	Brøndby Stadion, Brøndby
19:30	Farnerud 57'		Amauri 35'; Iaquinta 43'	Attendance: 29,000

27 July 2008	Borussia Dortmund	1–3	Juventus	Westfalenstadion, Dortmund
13:30	Krusca 78'		Amauri 5'; Iaquinta 51', 75'

6 August 2008	Manchester United	0–0	Juventus	Old Trafford, Manchester
20:00				Attendance: 76,000

=== TIM Trophy 2008 ===
==== Final tournament standings ====
- 3 points for win, 0 points for loss
- 2 points for penalty kick win, 1 point for penalty kick loss
- Milan wins tournament based on head-to-head result

Pos	Team	Pld	W	PKW	PKL	L	GF	GA	GD	Pts
1	(Italy) Milan	2	0	2	0	0	2	2	0	4
2	(Italy) Juventus	2	1	0	1	0	3	2	+1	4
3	(Italy) Internazionale	2	0	0	1	1	0	1	−1	1

==== Scorers ====
Rank	Name	Team	Goals
1	(Netherlands) Clarence Seedorf	(Italy) AC Milan	2
2	(Italy) Vincenzo Iaquinta	(Italy) Juventus	1
2	(France) David Trezeguet	(Italy) Juventus	1
2	(Italy) Marco Marchionni	(Italy) Juventus	1

==== Matches ====
29 July 2008	Juventus	2 – 2 (2 – 4 p)	AC Milan	Stadio Olimpico, Turin
19:30	Trezeguet 7'; Marchionni 11'		Seedorf 6', 42'
	Penalties
	Trezeguet (penalty missed); Iaquinta (penalty scored); Chiellini (penalty scored); Tiago (penalty missed)		(penalty scored) Kaká; (penalty scored) Pirlo; (penalty scored) Jankulovski; (penalty scored) Paloschi

29 July 2008	Juventus	1 – 0	Internazionale	Stadio Olimpico, Turin
21:00	Iaquinta 26'

=== Emirates Cup ===
==== Final tournament standings ====
- 3 points for win, 1 point for tie, 0 points for loss
- 1 point for every goal scored
- each team played 2 games; Juventus did not play Real Madrid, Arsenal did not play Hamburg
- Juventus finishes 3rd based on head-to-head result

Pos	Team	Pld	W	D	L	GF	GA	GD	Pts
1	Hamburg	2	1	0	1	4	2	+2	7
2	Real Madrid	2	1	0	1	2	2	0	5
3	Arsenal	2	1	0	1	1	1	0	4
4	Juventus	2	1	0	1	1	3	−2	4

Rules for classification: 1) points; 2) goal difference; 3) number of goals scored.

==== Scorers ====
Rank	Name	Team	Goals
1	(Croatia) Ivica Olić	(Germany) Hamburger SV	2
2	(Spain) Dani Parejo	(Spain) Real Madrid	1
2	(France) David Trezeguet	(Italy) Juventus	1
2	(Netherlands) Ruud van Nistelrooy	(Spain) Real Madrid	1
2	(Egypt) Mohamed Zidan	(Germany) Hamburger SV	1
2	(Peru) Paolo Guerrero	(Germany) Hamburger SV	1
2	(Togo) Emmanuel Adebayor	(England) Arsenal	1

==== Matches ====
2 August 2008	Arsenal	0 – 1	Juventus	Emirates Stadium, London
16:15			37' Trezeguet	Referee: Peter Walton

3 August 2008	Hamburg	3 – 0	Juventus	Emirates Stadium, London
14:00	Guerrero 19'; Olić 90+1', 90+2'			Referee: Chris Foy

=== Trofeo Luigi Berlusconi ===
17 August 2008	AC Milan	4 – 1	Juventus	San Siro, Milan
19:45	Jankulovski 21'; Ambrosini 24'; Inzaghi 51'; Ambrosini 78'		69' Pasquato; (yellow card) 72' Ekdal	Referee: (Italy) Nicola Rizzoli

=== Trofeo Birra Moretti ===
==== Final tournament standings ====
- 3 points for win, 0 points for loss
- 2 points for penalty kick win, 1 point for penalty kick loss
- Juventus wins tournament based on head-to-head result

Team	Pld	W	PKW	PKL	L	GF	GA	GD	Pts
Juventus	2	0	2	0	0	0	0	0	4
Milan	2	1	0	1	0	1	0	+1	4
Napoli	2	0	0	1	1	0	1	−1	1

==== Scorers ====
Rank	Name	Team	Goals
1	(Italy) Alberto Paloschi	(Italy) AC Milan	1

==== Matches ====
21 August 2008	Napoli	0 – 0 (4 – 5 p)	Juventus	Stadio San Paolo, Naples
19:45			(yellow card) 40' Esposito	Referee: (Italy) Domenico Celi
	Penalties
	De Zerbi (penalty missed); Zalayeta (penalty scored); Blasi (penalty scored); Vitale (penalty scored); Cannavaro (penalty scored)		(penalty scored) Esposito; (penalty scored) Nedvěd; (penalty scored) Giovinco; (penalty scored) Salihamidžić; (penalty scored) Amauri

21 August 2008	Juventus	0 – 0 (5 – 4 p)	AC Milan	Stadio San Paolo, Naples
22:15				Referee: Andrea Gervasoni
	Penalties
	Castiglia (penalty scored); Chimenti (penalty scored); Legrottaglie (penalty scored); Pasquato (penalty scored); Amauri (penalty missed); Molinaro (penalty scored)		(penalty scored) Seedorf; (penalty scored) Brocchi; (penalty scored) Paloschi; (penalty scored) Osuji; (penalty missed) Ambrosini; (penalty missed) Favalli

=== Trofeo Città di Messna ===
6 January 2009	Juventus	1 – 1 (4 – 5 p)	Monaco	Stadio San Filippo, Messina
17:00	Nedvěd (yellow card) 39'; Iaquinta 90'		35' (pen.) Leko	Referee: Emidio Morganti
	Penalties
	Giovinco (penalty scored); Esposito (penalty scored); Salihamidžić (penalty scored); De Ceglie (penalty missed); Legrottaglie (penalty scored)		(penalty scored) Modesto; (penalty scored) Bulot; (penalty scored) Mollo; (penalty scored) Adriano; (penalty scored) Bakar

== Competitions ==
=== Serie A ===
==== League table ====
Pos	Team	Pld	W	D	L	GF	GA	GD	Pts	Qualification or relegation
1	Internazionale (C)	38	25	9	4	70	32	+38	84	Qualification to Champions League group stage
2	Juventus	38	21	11	6	69	37	+32	74 (Note: Juventus finished ahead of Milan on head-to-head points: Juventus 4–2 Milan, Milan 1–1 Juventus.)	Qualification to Champions League group stage
3	Milan	38	22	8	8	70	35	+35	74	Qualification to Champions League group stage
4	Fiorentina	38	21	5	12	53	38	+15	68 (Note: Fiorentina finished ahead of Genoa on head-to-head points: Fiorentina 1–0 Genoa, Genoa 3–3 Fiorentina.)	Qualification to Champions League play-off round
5	Genoa	38	19	11	8	56	39	+17	68	Qualification to Europa League play-off round (Note: Lazio qualified for the play-off round of the 2009–10 UEFA Europa League by winning the 2008–09 Coppa Italia.)

Source: lega-calcio.it (in Italian)
Rules for classification: 1) points; 2) head-to-head points; 3) head-to-head goal difference; 4) head-to-head goals scored; 5) goal difference; 6) number of goals scored.
(C) Champions

==== Results summary ====
Overall								Home						Away					
Pld	W	D	L	GF	GA	GD	Pts	W	D	L	GF	GA	GD	W	D	L	GF	GA	GD
38	21	11	6	69	37	+32	74	11	6	2	38	19	+19	10	5	4	31	18	+13

Last updated: 31 May 2009.
Source: Competitive matches

==== Results by round ====
Round	1	2	3	4	5	6	7	8	9	10	11	12	13	14	15	16	17	18	19	20	21	22	23	24	25	26	27	28	29	30	31	32	33	34	35	36	37	38
Ground	A	H	A	H	A	H	A	H	A	H	A	H	A	H	A	H	A	H	A	H	A	H	A	H	A	H	A	H	A	H	A	H	A	H	A	H	A	H
Result	D	W	W	D	D	L	L	W	W	W	W	W	L	W	W	W	W	W	D	W	L	L	W	D	W	W	W	W	W	D	L	D	D	D	D	D	W	W
Position	8	6	2	5	7	11	12	10	9	6	6	3	3	2	2	2	2	2	2	2	2	3	2	2	2	2	2	2	2	2	2	3	3	3	3	3	2	2

Updated to match(es) played on 31 May 2009. Source: Competitive matches
A = Away; H = Home; W = Win; D = Draw; L = Loss

==== Matches ====
31 August 2008 1	Fiorentina	1–1	Juventus	Florence
20:30 CEST (UTC+02:00)	Melo (yellow card) 33' (yellow-red card) 83'; Gilardino 89', (yellow card) 89'	Report	Grygera (yellow card) 22'; Nedvěd (yellow card) 28', (goal) 39'; Camoranesi (yellow card) 64'	Stadium: Stadio Artemio Franchi; Attendance: 40,560; Referee: Emidio Morganti

14 September 2008 2	Juventus	1–0	Udinese	Turin
15:00 CEST (UTC+02:00)	Amauri 67'	Report	Ferronetti (yellow card) 10'	Stadium: Stadio Olimpico di Torino; Attendance: 20,320; Referee: Andrea De Marco

21 September 2008 3	Cagliari	0–1	Juventus	Cagliari
15:00 CEST (UTC+02:00)	Bianco (yellow card) 47'	Report	Amauri 39'; Marchisio (yellow card) 66'	Stadium: Stadio Sant'Elia; Attendance: 17,000; Referee: Christian Brighi

24 September 2008 4	Juventus	1–1	Catania	Turin
20:30 CEST (UTC+02:00)	Amauri 16'	Report	Ledesma (yellow card) 49'; Sardo (yellow card) 62'; Plasmati 68'; Bizzarri (yellow card) 90'; Silvestre (yellow card) 90+2'	Stadium: Stadio Olimpico di Torino; Attendance: 22,053; Referee: Nicola Pierpaoli

28 September 2008 5	Sampdoria	0–0	Juventus	Genoa
20:30 CEST (UTC+02:00)	Gastaldello (yellow card) 3'; Lucchini (yellow card) 21'	Report	Mellberg (yellow card) 55'; Camoranesi (yellow card) 71'	Stadium: Stadio Luigi Ferraris; Attendance: 27,043; Referee: Nicola Rizzoli

5 October 2008 6	Juventus	1–2	Palermo	Turin
15:00 CEST (UTC+02:00)	Sissoko (yellow card) 36' (yellow-red card) 41'; Del Piero 39'; Grygera (yellow card) 51'; Amauri (yellow card) 76'	Report	Miccoli 23'; Bovo (yellow card) 73'; Liverani (yellow card) 78'; Mchedlidze 81'	Stadium: Stadio Olimpico di Torino; Attendance: 22,495; Referee: Paolo Tagliavento

18 October 2008 7	Napoli	2–1	Juventus	Naples
20:30 CEST (UTC+02:00)	Gargano (yellow card) 44'; Blasi (yellow card) 60'; Hamšík 64'; Lavezzi 80', (yellow card) 81'	Report	Poulsen (yellow card) 24'; Molinaro (yellow card) 33'; Amauri 61'; Salihamidžić (yellow card) 68'; Grygera (yellow card) 84'	Stadium: Stadio San Paolo; Attendance: 43,710; Referee: Massimiliano Saccani

25 October 2008 8	Juventus	1–0	Torino	Turin
20:30 CEST (UTC+02:00)	Sissoko (yellow card) 19'; Amauri 48'; Giovinco (yellow card) 69'	Report	Barone (yellow card) 34'; Di Loreto (yellow card) 74'; P. Zanetti (yellow card) 86'	Stadium: Stadio Olimpico di Torino; Attendance: 22,114; Referee: Gianluca Rocchi

29 October 2008 9	Bologna	1–2	Juventus	Bologna
20:30 CET (UTC+01:00)	Marchini (yellow card) 59'; Mudingayi (yellow card) 64'; Di Vaio 74'; Carrus (yellow card) 78'	Report	Nedvěd 12', 56'; Molinaro (yellow card) 24'	Stadium: Stadio Renato Dall'Ara; Attendance: 31,743; Referee: Matteo Trefoloni

1 November 2008 10	Juventus	2–0	Roma	Turin
20:30 CET (UTC+01:00)	Del Piero 38'; Marchionni 48'	Report	Pizarro (yellow card) 7'; Panucci (yellow card) 15'	Stadium: Stadio Olimpico di Torino; Attendance: 21,700; Referee: Nicola Rizzoli

9 November 2008 11	Chievo	0–2	Juventus	Verona
15:00 CET (UTC+01:00)	Esposito (yellow card) 28'; Langella (yellow card) 46'; Bentivoglio (yellow card) 49'; Mantovani (yellow card) 52'; Iunco (yellow card) 71'	Report	Molinaro (yellow card) 22'; Legrottaglie (yellow card) 31'; Del Piero 40'; Tiago (yellow card) 46'; Iaquinta 53'; Ekdal (yellow card) 84'	Stadium: Stadio Marc'Antonio Bentegodi; Attendance: 26,578; Referee: Luca Banti

13 November 2008 12	Juventus	4–1	Genoa	Turin
20:30 CET (UTC+01:00)	Grygera 6'; Amauri 26'; Iaquinta 85'; Papastathopoulos 90+2' (o.g.)	Report	Motta (yellow card) 57'; Rossi (yellow card) 84'; Milito 89' (pen.)	Stadium: Stadio Olimpico di Torino; Attendance: 24,463; Referee: Gianluca Rocchi

22 November 2008 13	Internazionale	1–0	Juventus	Milan
20:30 CET (UTC+01:00)	Materazzi (yellow card) 50'; Samuel (yellow card) 54'; Muntari 72'; Júlio César (yellow card) 90'	Report	Amauri (yellow card) 25'; Legrottaglie (yellow card) 29'	Stadium: San Siro; Attendance: 76,437; Referee: Nicola Rizzoli

29 November 2008 14	Juventus	4–0	Reggina	Turin
20:30 CET (UTC+01:00)	Camoranesi (yellow card) 24', (goal) 28'; Amauri 44'; Chiellini 62'; Del Piero 74' (pen.)	Report	Valdez (yellow card) 25'; Cozza (yellow card) 45+1'; Santos (yellow card) 61'	Stadium: Stadio Olimpico di Torino; Attendance: 21,389; Referee: Antonio Damato

7 December 2008 15	Lecce	1–2	Juventus	Lecce
15:00 CET (UTC+01:00)	Schiavi (yellow card) 10'; Stendardo (yellow card) 30'; Ariatti (yellow card) 61'; Cacia 83', (yellow card) 83'	Report	Chiellini (yellow card) 29'; Giovinco 57'; Legrottaglie (yellow card) 77'; Amauri 90'	Stadium: Stadio Via del Mare; Attendance: 28,222; Referee: Nicola Pierpaoli

14 December 2008 16	Juventus	4–2	AC Milan	Turin
20:30 CET (UTC+01:00)	Del Piero 16' (pen.); Chellini 34'; Mellberg (yellow card) 38'; Amauri 41', 69'; Sissoko (yellow card) 75'	Report	Pato 31'; Emerson (yellow card) 35'; Zambrotta (yellow card) 37' (yellow-red card) 65'; Ambrosini 56', (yellow card) 73'	Stadium: Stadio Olimpico di Torino; Attendance: 24,862; Referee: Nicola Rizzoli

21 December 2008 17	Atalanta	1–3	Juventus	Bergamo
15:00 CET (UTC+01:00)	Doni (yellow card) 39'; Vieri 48'; De Ascentis (yellow card) 64'; Pellegrino (yellow card) 70'; Manfredini (yellow card) 80'	Report	Del Piero 30'; Legrottaglie 37'; De Ceglie (yellow card) 49'; Amauri 81'; Marchisio (yellow card) 84'; Sissoko (yellow card) 90'	Stadium: Stadio Atleti Azzurri d'Italia; Attendance: 21,814; Referee: Stefano Farina

11 January 2009 18	Juventus	1–0	Siena	Turin
15:00 CET (UTC+01:00)	Del Piero 33'; Grygera (yellow card) 45+1'	Report	Codrea (yellow card) 16'	Stadium: Stadio Olimpico di Torino; Attendance: 20,859; Referee: Carmine Russo

18 January 2009 19	Lazio	1–1	Juventus	Rome
20:30 CET (UTC+01:00)	Ledesma 25'; Dabo (yellow card) 42'; Radu (yellow card) 75'; Lichtsteiner (yellow card) 85'; Brocchi (yellow card) 89'	Report	Mellberg 30'; Del Piero (yellow card) 57'; Molinaro (yellow card) 66'; Sissoko (yellow card) 81'	Stadium: Stadio Olimpico; Attendance: 55,000; Referee: Emidio Morganti

24 January 2009 20	Juventus	1–0	Fiorentina	Turin
20:30 CET (UTC+01:00)	Marchisio 21'; Grygera (yellow card) 26'; Zanetti (yellow card) 66'; Giovinco (yellow card) 88'	Report	Montolivo (yellow card) 31'; Melo (yellow card) 66'	Stadium: Stadio Olimpico di Torino; Attendance: 22,560; Referee: Massimiliano Saccani

28 January 2009 21	Udinese	2–1	Juventus	Udine
20:30 CET (UTC+01:00)	Quagliarella 20'; Di Natale 74'; Pasquale (yellow card) 76'	Report	Legrottaglie (yellow card) 11'; Nedvěd (yellow card) 53'; Iaquinta 77' (pen.)	Stadium: Stadio Friuli; Attendance: 23,000; Referee: Paolo Tagliavento

31 January 2009 22	Juventus	2–3	Cagliari	Turin
20:45 CET (UTC+01:00)	Chiellini (yellow card) 23'; Sissoko 31'; Nedvěd 38'; Del Piero (yellow card) 58'	Report	Biondini 16'; Pisano (yellow card) 30'; Jeda 54'; Agostini (yellow card) 73'; Conti (yellow card) 77'; Matri 78'	Stadium: Stadio Olimpico di Torino; Attendance: 20,373; Referee: Luca Banti

8 February 2009 23	Catania	1–2	Juventus	Catania
15:00 CET (UTC+01:00)	Stovini (yellow card) 10'; Silvestre (yellow card) 41'; Morimoto 51'; Tedesco (yellow card) 61'	Report	Iaquinta 11', (yellow card) 11' (yellow-red card) 13'; Amauri (yellow card) 16'; Legrottaglie (yellow card) 28'; Sissoko (yellow card) 59'; Poulsen 90+1'	Stadium: Stadio Angelo Massimino; Attendance: 19,755; Referee: Emidio Morganti

15 February 2009 24	Juventus	1–1	Sampdoria	Turin
15:00 CET (UTC+01:00)	Nedvěd (yellow card) 48'; Amauri 62'; Legrottaglie (yellow card) 66'	Report	Pazzini 10'; Franceschini (yellow card) 45'; Gastaldello (yellow card) 65'	Stadium: Stadio Olimpico di Torino; Attendance: 23,066; Referee: Daniele Orsato

21 February 2009 25	Palermo	0–2	Juventus	Palermo
20:30 CET (UTC+01:00)	Bovo (yellow card) 32'	Report	Grygera (yellow card) 25'; Sissoko 27'; Camoranesi (yellow card) 65'; Molinaro (yellow card) 76'; Trezeguet 79'	Stadium: Stadio Renzo Barbera; Attendance: 35,293; Referee: Paolo Tagliavento

28 February 2009 26	Juventus	1–0	Napoli	Turin
20:30 CET (UTC+01:00)	Legrottaglie (yellow card) 33'; Marchisio 44'; Chiellini (yellow card) 90+3'	Report		Stadium: Stadio Olimpico di Torino; Attendance: 20,700; Referee: Nicola Ayroldi

7 March 2009 27	Torino	0–1	Juventus	Turin
20:30 CET (UTC+01:00)	Corini (yellow card) 30'; Pisano (yellow card) 90+2'	Report	Marchisio (yellow card) 22'; Chiellini 81'	Stadium: Stadio Olimpico di Torino; Attendance: 21,017; Referee: Stefano Farina

14 March 2009 28	Juventus	4–1	Bologna	Turin
20:30 CET (UTC+01:00)	Tiago (yellow card) 20'; Salihamidžić 48'; Giovinco 71'; Del Piero 75', 88'	Report	Mutarelli 24'; Mudingayi (yellow card) 41'; Terzi (yellow card) 56'; C. Zenoni (yellow card) 64'	Stadium: Stadio Olimpico di Torino; Attendance: 21,790; Referee: Antonio Damato

21 March 2009 29	Roma	1–4	Juventus	Rome
20:30 CET (UTC+01:00)	Loria (yellow card) 24', (goal) 48'; Mexès (yellow card) 40'; Riise (yellow card) 67'; Ménez (yellow card) 78'	Report	Tiago (yellow card) 29'; Iaquinta 34', 55'; Mellberg 68'; Molinaro (yellow card) 70'; Nedvěd 74'	Stadium: Stadio Olimpico; Attendance: 56,759; Referee: Gianluca Rocchi

5 April 2009 30	Juventus	3–3	Chievo	Turin
15:00 CEST (UTC+02:00)	Chiellini 34'; Mantovani 53' (o.g.); Iaquinta 79'	Report	Pellissier 25', 44', 90+1'; Sardo (yellow card) 28'	Stadium: Stadio Olimpico di Torino; Attendance: 24,071; Referee: Paolo Mazzoleni

11 April 2009 31	Genoa	3–2	Juventus	Genoa
20:30 CEST (UTC+02:00)	Motta 29', 45+3'; Ferrari (yellow card) 45'; Bocchetti (yellow card) 79'; Palladino 88'	Report	Del Piero 45' (pen.); Zebina (yellow card) 54'; Camoranesi (red card) 65'; Grygera (yellow card) 76'; Iaquinta 84'; Marchisio (yellow card) 85'	Stadium: Stadio Luigi Ferraris; Attendance: 32,744; Referee: Gianluca Rocchi

18 April 2009 32	Juventus	1–1	Internazionale	Turin
20:30 CEST (UTC+02:00)	Legrottaglie (yellow card) 33'; Poulsen (yellow card) 53'; Tiago (red card) 76'; Grygera 90+1'	Report	Figo (yellow card) 3'; Balotelli 64', (yellow card) 68'	Stadium: Stadio Olimpico di Torino; Attendance: 24,790; Referee: Stefano Farina

26 April 2009 33	Reggina	2–2	Juventus	Reggio Calabria
15:00 CEST (UTC+02:00)	Barillà 26'; Puggioni (yellow card) 45'; Hallfreðsson 69'	Report	Mellberg (yellow card) 13'; Marchisio (yellow card) 34'; Del Piero 48' (pen.); C. Zanetti 73'	Stadium: Stadio Oreste Granillo; Attendance: 20,763; Referee: Massimiliano Saccani

3 May 2009 34	Juventus	2–2	Lecce	Turin
15:00 CEST (UTC+02:00)	Mellberg (yellow card) 35'; Nedvěd 54', 66', (yellow card) 56'; Zebina (yellow card) 90'	Report	Konan 11', (yellow card) 51'; Castillo 90+3'	Stadium: Stadio Olimpico di Torino; Attendance: 21,819; Referee: Gabriele Gava

10 May 2009 35	AC Milan	1–1	Juventus	Milan
20:30 CEST (UTC+02:00)	Beckham (yellow card) 4'; Favalli (yellow card) 24' (yellow-red card) 85'; Seedorf 57'; Maldini (yellow card) 67'	Report	Iaquinta 60'; Poulsen (yellow card) 64'; Chiellini (yellow card) 67'	Stadium: San Siro; Attendance: 78,979; Referee: Daniele Orsato

17 May 2009 36	Juventus	2–2	Atalanta	Turin
15:00 CEST (UTC+02:00)	Iaquinta 26'; C. Zanetti 36'	Report	Cigarini 2'; Pellegrino 44'	Stadium: Stadio Olimpico di Torino; Attendance: 200; Referee: Nicola Ayroldi

24 May 2009 37	Siena	0–3	Juventus	Siena
15:00 CEST (UTC+02:00)	Vergassola (yellow card) 25'; Coppola (yellow card) 68'	Report	De Ceglie (yellow card) 10'; Del Piero 18', 89'; C. Zanetti (yellow card) 21'; Marchisio 37'	Stadium: Stadio Artemio Franchi – Montepaschi Arena; Attendance: 15,337; Referee: Antonio Damato

31 May 2009 38	Juventus	2–0	Lazio	Turin
15:00 CEST (UTC+02:00)	Iaquinta 3', 59'	Report	Lichtsteiner (yellow card) 78'	Stadium: Stadio Olimpico di Torino; Attendance: 23,721; Referee: Sebastiano Peruzzo

=== Coppa Italia ===
14 January 2009 Round of 16	Juventus	3–0	Catania	Turin
20:45 CET (UTC+01:00)	Marchionni 4'; Giovinco 69'; Del Piero 71'; Zanetti (yellow card) 72'		Sardo (yellow card) 52'; Ledesma (yellow card) 60'	Stadium: Stadio Olimpico di Torino; Referee: Luca Banti

4 February 2009 Quarter-finals	Juventus	0–0 (4–3 p)	Napoli	Turin
20:45 CET (UTC+01:00)	Molinaro (yellow card) 45+1'; Mellberg (yellow card) 63'; Sissoko (yellow card) 89'; Legrottaglie (yellow card) 116'; Nedvěd (yellow card) 120'		Contini (yellow card) 25'; Montervino (yellow card) 55'; Santacroce (yellow card) 65'; Bogliacino (yellow card) 80'; Pazienza (yellow card) 99'	Stadium: Stadio Olimpico di Torino; Attendance: 30,135; Referee: Nicola Ayroldi
	Penalties
	Del Piero (penalty scored); Trezeguet (penalty scored); Nedvěd (penalty missed); Marchionni (penalty scored); Sissoko (penalty missed); Legrottaglie (penalty scored)		(penalty scored) Hamšík; (penalty scored) Bogliacino; (penalty scored) Denis; (penalty missed) Lavezzi; (penalty missed) Contini; (penalty missed) Gargano

3 March 2009 Semi-finals; First leg	Lazio	2–1	Juventus	Rome
20:45 CET (UTC+01:00)	Matuzalém (yellow card) 14'; Pandev 65'; Rocchi 78', (yellow card) 79'		Iaquinta (yellow card) 16'; Grygera (yellow card) 31'; Marchionni 34'; Chiellini (yellow card) 70'	Stadium: Stadio Olimpico; Attendance: 50,000; Referee: Paolo Tagliavento

22 April 2009 Semi-finals; Second leg	Juventus	1–2 (2–4 agg.)	Lazio	Turin
20:45 CEST (UTC+02:00)	Marchisio (yellow card) 18'; Del Piero 64'; Camoranesi (red card) 82'		Matuzalém (yellow card) 27'; Zárate 38'; Kolarov 52'	Stadium: Stadio Olimpico di Torino; Attendance: 16,689; Referee: Nicola Rizzoli

=== UEFA Champions League ===
==== Third qualifying round ====
13 August 2008 First leg	Juventus (Italy)	4–0	(Slovakia) Artmedia Petržalka	Turin, Italy
20:45 CEST (UTC+02:00)	Camoranesi 8'; Del Piero 26'; Chiellini 39', (yellow card) 84'; Legrottaglie 90'	Report	Obžera (yellow card) 57'	Stadium: Stadio Olimpico di Torino; Attendance: 23,102; Referee: Kyros Vassaras (Greece)

26 August 2008 Second leg	Artmedia Petržalka (Slovakia)	1–1 (1–5 agg.)	(Italy) Juventus	Bratislava, Slovakia
20:45 CEST (UTC+02:00)	Fodrek 13'; Saláta (yellow card) 52'	Report	Amauri 25'; Camoranesi (yellow card) 44'; Marchisio (yellow card) 50'	Stadium: Tehelné pole Attendance: 13,450; Referee: Luis Medina Cantalejo (Spain)

==== Group stage ====
Pos	Team	Pld	W	D	L	GF	GA	GD	Pts	Qualification
1	(Italy) Juventus	6	3	3	0	7	3	+4	12	Advance to knockout phase
2	(Spain) Real Madrid	6	4	0	2	9	5	+4	12	Advance to knockout phase
3	(Russia) Zenit Saint Petersburg	6	1	2	3	4	7	−3	5	Transfer to UEFA Cup
4	(Belarus) BATE Borisov	6	0	3	3	3	8	−5	3	

Source: RSSSF

17 September 2008 1	Juventus (Italy)	1–0	(Russia) Zenit Saint Petersburg	Turin, Italy
20:45 CEST (UTC+02:00)	Del Piero 76'; Salihamidžić (yellow card) 84'	Report	Pogrebnyak (yellow card) 18'; Šírl (yellow card) 68'	Stadium: Stadio Olimpico di Torino; Attendance: 20,853; Referee: Frank De Bleeckere (Belgium)

30 September 2008 2	BATE Borisov (Belarus)	2–2	(Italy) Juventus	Minsk, Belarus
20:45 CEST (UTC+02:00)	Nyakhaychyk (yellow card) 8'; Krivets 17'; Stasevich 23'; Valadzko (yellow card) 65'; Kazantsev (yellow card) 79'	Report	Grygera (yellow card) 26'; Iaquinta 29', 45+3'; Sissoko (yellow card) 80'; Marchisio (yellow card) 82'	Stadium: Dinamo Stadium; Attendance: 31,400; Referee: Martin Atkinson (England)

21 October 2008 3	Juventus (Italy)	2–1	(Spain) Real Madrid	Turin, Italy
20:45 CEST (UTC+02:00)	Del Piero 5'; Amauri 49', (yellow card) 49'	Report	Van Nistelrooy 66'	Stadium: Stadio Olimpico di Torino; Attendance: 25,813; Referee: Wolfgang Stark (Germany)

5 November 2008 4	Real Madrid (Spain)	0–2	(Italy) Juventus	Madrid, Spain
20:45 CET (UTC+01:00)	Drenthe (yellow card) 31'; Guti (yellow card) 36'; Van Nistelrooy (yellow card) 51'	Report	Del Piero 17', 67'; Sissoko (yellow card) 28'; Legrottaglie (yellow card) 34'; Mellberg (yellow card) 78'	Stadium: Santiago Bernabéu; Attendance: 71,560; Referee: Pieter Vink (Netherlands)

25 November 2008 5	Zenit Saint Petersburg (Russia)	0–0	(Italy) Juventus	Saint Petersburg, Russia
20:45 CET (UTC+01:00)	Lombaerts (yellow card) 10'; Tymoshchuk (yellow card) 76'	Report	Iaquinta (yellow card) 43'; Camoranesi (yellow card) 45'; Sissoko (yellow card) 90+2'	Stadium: Petrovsky Stadium; Attendance: 20,155; Referee: Claus Bo Larsen (Denmark)

10 December 2008 6	Juventus (Italy)	0–0	(Belarus) BATE Borisov	Turin, Italy
20:45 CET (UTC+01:00)	Amauri (yellow card) 48'	Report	Sosnovski (yellow card) 47'; Vyeramko (yellow card) 53'; Khagush (yellow card) 62'; Yermakovich (yellow card) 90+3'	Stadium: Stadio Olimpico di Torino; Attendance: 5,753; Referee: Costas Kapitanis (Cyprus)

==== Knockout phase ====
===== Round of 16 =====
25 February 2009 First leg	Chelsea (England)	1–0	(Italy) Juventus	London, England
20:45 CET (UTC+01:00)	Drogba 12'; Ballack (yellow card) 58'	Report	Molinaro (yellow card) 52'; Sissoko (yellow card) 82'; Marchisio (yellow card) 90'	Stadium: Stamford Bridge; Attendance: 38,079; Referee: Olegário Benquerença (Portugal)

10 March 2009 Second leg	Juventus (Italy)	2–2 (2–3 agg.)	(England) Chelsea	Turin, Italy
20:45 CET (UTC+01:00)	Iaquinta 19'; Salihamidžić (yellow card) 45+2'; Chiellini (yellow card) 54' (yellow-red card) 70'; Del Piero 74' (pen.), (yellow card) 90+2'	Report	Essien 45+1'; Čech (yellow card) 63'; Drogba (yellow card) 69', (goal) 83'; A. Cole (yellow card) 88'; Anelka (yellow card) 90+1'	Stadium: Stadio Olimpico di Torino; Attendance: 27,319; Referee: Alberto Undiano Mallenco (Spain)

== Statistics ==
=== Appearances and goals ===
No.	Pos	Nat	Player	Total		Serie A		Coppa		Champions League	
No.	Pos	Nat	Player	Apps	Goals	Apps	Goals	Apps	Goals	Apps	Goals
1	GK	(Italy) ITA	Gianluigi Buffon	30	-30	23	-25	2	-2	5	-3
21	DF	(Czech Republic) CZE	Zdeněk Grygera	43	2	28+3	2	4	0	8	0
4	DF	(Sweden) SWE	Olof Mellberg	37	2	22+4	2	3+1	0	6+1	0
3	DF	(Italy) ITA	Giorgio Chiellini	36	5	27	4	1	0	8	1
28	DF	(Italy) ITA	Cristian Molinaro	40	0	29	0	1+1	0	9	0
33	DF	(Italy) ITA	Nicola Legrottaglie	35	2	25	1	2	0	8	1
19	MF	(Italy) ITA	Claudio Marchisio	32	3	20+4	3	1+1	0	4+2	0
11	MF	(Czech Republic) CZE	Pavel Nedvěd	44	7	28+4	7	1+2	0	9	0
22	MF	(Mali) MLI	Mohamed Sissoko	32	2	20+1	2	3	0	7+1	0
8	FW	(Brazil) BRA	Amauri	44	14	27+5	12	2	0	5+5	2
10	FW	(Italy) ITA	Alessandro Del Piero	43	21	28+3	13	2+1	2	8+1	6
13	GK	(Austria) AUT	Alexander Manninger	23	-16	15+1	-11	2	-2	5	-3
9	FW	(Italy) ITA	Vincenzo Iaquinta	38	15	19+9	12	3	0	4+3	3
32	MF	(Italy) ITA	Marco Marchionni	35	3	18+8	1	4	2	3+2	0
16	MF	(Argentina) ARG	Mauro Camoranesi	27	2	15+5	1	0+1	0	6	1
18	MF	(Denmark) DEN	Christian Poulsen	29	1	14+9	1	1+2	0	3	0
30	MF	(Portugal) POR	Tiago	20	0	12+3	0	2	0	3	0
29	DF	(Italy) ITA	Paolo De Ceglie	26	0	11+8	0	3	0	2+2	0
20	FW	(Italy) ITA	Sebastian Giovinco	27	3	9+10	2	3	1	2+3	0
6	MF	(Italy) ITA	Cristiano Zanetti	14	2	9+3	2	1	0	1	0
7	MF	(Bosnia and Herzegovina) BIH	Hasan Salihamidžić	15	1	7+4	1	0	0	1+3	0
17	FW	(France) FRA	David Trezeguet	15	1	4+5	1	1+2	0	1+2	0
5	DF	(France) FRA	Jonathan Zebina	8	0	4+4	0	0	0	0	0
15	DF	(Croatia) CRO	Dario Knežević	4	0	3	0	0	0	0+1	0
41	DF	(Italy) ITA	Lorenzo Ariaudo	5	0	2+1	0	2	0	0	0
27	MF	(Sweden) SWE	Albin Ekdal	3	0	0+3	0	0	0	0	0
46	FW	(Italy) ITA	Ciro Immobile	1	0	0+1	0	0	0	0	0
47	FW	(Somalia) SOM	Ayub Daud	1	0	0+1	0	0	0	0	0
35	MF	(Italy) ITA	Simone Esposito	2	0	0	0	0+1	0	0+1	0
36	MF	(Italy) ITA	Luca Castiglia	1	0	0	0	0	0	0+1	0
12	GK	(Italy) ITA	Antonio Chimenti	0	0	0	0	0	0	0	0

Last updated: 31 May 2009
Source: Competitions

=== Goalscorers ===
Position	Nation	Number	Name	Serie A	Champions League	Coppa Italia	Total
1	(Italy)	10	Alessandro Del Piero	13	6	2	21
2	(Brazil)	8	Amauri	12	2	0	14
=	(Italy)	9	Vincenzo Iaquinta	12	2	0	14
4	(Czech Republic)	11	Pavel Nedvěd	7	0	0	7
5	(Italy)	3	Giorgio Chiellini	4	1	0	5
=	(Italy)	19	Claudio Marchisio	3	0	0	3
6	(Italy)	20	Sebastian Giovinco	2	0	1	3
=	(Czech Republic)	21	Zdeněk Grygera	2	1	0	3
=	(Italy)	32	Marco Marchionni	1	0	2	3
10	(Sweden)	4	Olof Mellberg	2	0	0	2
=	(Italy)	6	Cristiano Zanetti	2	0	0	2
=	(Italy)	16	Mauro Camoranesi	1	1	0	2
=	(Mali)	22	Mohamed Sissoko	2	0	0	2
=	(Italy)	33	Nicola Legrottaglie	1	1	0	2
15	(Bosnia and Herzegovina)	7	Hasan Salihamidžić	1	0	0	1
=	(France)	17	David Trezeguet	1	0	0	1
=	(Denmark)	18	Christian Poulsen	1	0	0	1
/	/	/	Own Goals	2	0	0	2
			TOTALS	69	14	5	88

=== Disciplinary record ===
Disciplinary records for all competitive matches. Players with 1 card or more included only.

N	Pos.	Nat.	Name	Yellow card	Second yellow card	Red card	Notes
22	MF	(Mali)	Sissoko	10	1	0	
33	DF	(Italy)	Legrottaglie	10	0	0	
21	DF	(Czech Republic)	Grygera	9	0	0	
16	MF	(Italy)	Camoranesi	7	1	1	
3	DF	(Italy)	Chiellini	7	1	0	
19	MF	(Italy)	Marchisio	7	0	0	
28	DF	(Italy)	Molinaro	7	0	0	
4	DF	(Sweden)	Mellberg	6	0	0	
8	FW	(Brazil)	Amauri	5	0	0	
11	MF	(Czech Republic)	Nedvěd	4	0	0	
30	MF	(Portugal)	Tiago	3	0	1	
9	FW	(Italy)	Iaquinta	3	1	0	
6	MF	(Italy)	Zanetti	3	0	0	
7	MF	(Bosnia and Herzegovina)	Salihamidžić	3	0	0	
10	FW	(Italy)	Del Piero	3	0	0	
5	DF	(France)	Zebina	2	0	0	
18	MF	(Denmark)	Poulsen	2	0	0	
20	FW	(Italy)	Giovinco	2	0	0	
22	DF	(Italy)	De Ceglie	2	0	0	
27	MF	(Sweden)	Ekdal	1	0	0	

Last updated: 2009-05-31
Source: Match reports in Match Results
Only competitive matches
(yellow card) = Number of bookings; (second yellow card) = Number of sending offs after a second yellow card; (red card) = Number of sending offs by a direct red card.
