= Dario Venitucci =

Italian footballer (born 1987)

Personal information
- Date of birth: 30 January 1987 (age 39)
- Place of birth: Turin, Italy
- Height: 1.72 m (5 ft 8 in)
- Position: Midfielder

Team information
- Current team: Clivense
- Number: 10

Youth career
- 1999–2006: Juventus

Senior career*
Years	Team	Apps	(Gls)
2006–2010	Juventus	5	(0)
2007–2008	→ Treviso (loan)	20	(3)
2008	→ Mantova (loan)	7	(0)
2009	→ Avellino (loan)	18	(2)
2009–2010	→ Arezzo (loan)	29	(3)
2010–	Bassano Virtus	27	(1)
2011–2012	Foggia	22	(5)
2012–2013	Carrarese	22	(1)
2013–2014	Foggia	30	(4)
2014–2015	Barletta	29	(3)
2015–2016	Santarcangelo	33	(5)
2016–2017	Livorno	18	(3)
2017–2018	Bassano Virtus	25	(2)
2018–2019	Renate	31	(1)
2019–2021	Luparense	55	(11)
2021–2022	Cjarlins Muzane	30	(3)
2022–	Clivense	3	(0)
- * Club domestic league appearances and goals as of 4 October 2023

Dario Venitucci (born 30 January 1987) is an Italian football midfielder who plays for Serie D club Clivense.

== Club career ==
=== Juventus ===
Venitucci began his youth career with his hometown club Juventus, and was promoted to the Primavera youth set-up in 2004. He was part of the squad that won the 2006 Campionato Nazionale Primavera, the first time Juventus have won it in twelve years. Venitucci was called up to the first team squad in for the 2006-07 season when Juventus had been relegated to Serie B due to the Calciopoli scandal, and was part of the team that led Juventus back to Serie A in 2007. Venitucci made his first team debut on 25 November 2006 against U.S. Lecce, replacing Claudio Marchisio in the 74th minute. He also made his first start for Juventus against Lecce later in the season, in a 3–1 win. In all Venitucci made 12 appearances in all competitions for Juventus that season.

=== F.B.C. Treviso ===
After Juventus were promoted back to Serie A, Venitucci was sent out on loan like many of his fellow youngsters. In July 2007, he was signed by Serie B side Treviso on a season long loan. Venitucci scored 3 goals in 20 league matches for the club, helping the club avoid relegation to the Lega Pro Prima Divisione. On 30 June 2008 Venitucci returned to Juventus.

=== Mantova and Avellino ===
Following his return, Juventus again opted to loan out the rising star to Serie B side Mantova, in order to gain first team experience. However, in January 2009 Juventus decided to recall him due to the lack of games. He was simultaneously loaned out to Serie B strugglers US Avellino, as they felt this move would prove more successful than the short lived loan at Mantova. With Avellino, Venitucci established himself in the club's starting line-up and he scored 2 goals in 18 league appearances.

=== A.C. Arezzo ===
In June 2009, Venitucci returned to Turin but did not figure in Ciro Ferrara's plans. He moved to third division club A.C. Arezzo on loan along with teammates Oussama Essabr, Andrea Pisani, and Riccardo Maniero. With Arezzo, he was a regular starter and performed well in his lone season with the club, making, in all 29 league appearances, scoring 3 goals.

=== Bassano Virtus ===
On 30 June 2010 Venitucci returned to his parent club but was almost instantly sold to Lega Pro side Bassano Virtus on a co-ownership agreement. With the third division side, Venitucci again established himself in the starting line-up and went on to make 27 league appearances, scoring a single goal, and notching up 8 yellow cards. In June 2011 Bassano acquired Venitucci and Samon Reider Rodriguez outright from Juventus.

Following a stellar season with the mid-table side, Venitucci was signed by U.S. Foggia, a club that nearly gained promotion to Serie B in the 2010-11 Lega Pro season.

=== Foggia ===
On 15 July 2011 Venitucci was signed by Lega Pro Prima Divisione team U.S. Foggia.

=== Carrarese ===
After the bankruptcy of Foggia, he joined Carrarese Calcio.

=== Bassano Virtus ===
Venitucci re-joined former club Bassano Virtus for a second time on 17 July 2017.

=== Luparense ===
On 3 July 2019 it was confirmed, that Venitucci had joined Luparense.
