= Andrea Pisani =

Andrea Pisani may refer to:

- Andrea Pisani (actor) (born 1987), Italian actor and comedian
- Andrea Pisani (admiral) (1662–1718), Venetian admiral
- Andrea Pisani (footballer) (born 1987), Italian footballer
