= Andrea Pisani (footballer) =

Italian footballer (born 1987)

Personal information
- Date of birth: 15 March 1987 (age 39)
- Place of birth: Castelfranco Veneto, Italy
- Height: 1.86 m (6 ft 1 in)
- Position: Centre-back

Youth career
- –2006: Juventus

Senior career*
Years	Team	Apps	(Gls)
2006–2010	Juventus	0	(0)
2007–2008	→ Pistoiese (loan)	24	(0)
2008–2009	→ Pro Patria (loan)	29	(0)
2009–2010	→ Cittadella (loan)	21	(0)
2010–2013	Portogruaro	29	(0)
2011–2012	→ Barletta (loan)	17	(0)
2013–2014	Sorrento	15	(0)
2014–2015	Arezzo	19	(2)
2015–2016	Pro Patria	48	(1)
2016–2017	Pineto	21	(0)
2017–2018	Akragas	21	(0)
2018–2019	Cjarlins Muzane	12	(1)
2019–2020	Chions	10	(0)
2020–2021	Portogruaro		
2021–2022	Opitergina		
- * Club domestic league appearances and goals as of 21:48, 14 February 2023 (UTC)

Andrea Pisani (born 15 March 1987) is an Italian professional footballer.

== Career ==
=== Early career ===
Pisani began his youth career with Juventus FC in the late 1990s, and was promoted to the Primavera youth set-up in 2005. The young defender was part of a very elite youth set-up alongside the likes of Domenico Criscito, Paolo De Ceglie, Davide Lanzafame, Claudio Marchisio, Michele Paolucci, Sebastian Giovinco, and Dario Venitucci, all of which have represented Italy at various stages of international football. After graduating the Juventus youth system, Pisani was called up to the first team squad in 2006, and was part of the team that led Juventus back to Serie A in 2007. During the season, Pisani made his senior debut and three other appearances with Juventus during the Serie B campaign. Still, after graduating from the youth team, he was loaned out to fourth-division club Juve Stabia, joining Juventus teammate Stefano Di Cuonzo. After an impressive loan spell that included 26 appearances and 5 goals, he moved to the Italian third division with Pro Patria, where he went on to make 25 appearances and added 3 more goals to his tally.

=== Serie B ===
On 30 June 2009, Pisani returned to Juventus; in July, a deal to move on loan again to Lega Pro Prima Divisione side A.C. Arezzo was finalised but was immediately cancelled. Only a few weeks later, the defender was sent on loan by Juventus to Serie B side A.S. Cittadella, where he has managed a single goal in 21 appearances for the Serie B club, helping them avoid relegation. On 1 July 2010, he again returned to Juventus, but did not train with the club's first team, and was not called up to the UEFA Europa League squad by then coach Luigi Delneri. Pisani was then loaned out to Serie B newcomers, Calcio Portogruaro Summaga, alongside Salvatore D'Elia. In what had been hoped to be a successful season for the 22-year-old, the 2010-11 Serie B season proved to be far less successful than his previous loan stints, as the player made just 8 league appearances after suffering from major injury woes. Portogruaro suffered from relegation, finishing 22nd in the league.

=== S.S. Barletta ===
On 30 June 2011 Pisani again returned to Juventus, but was soon sent on loan once more. Following a poor campaign for club and player, Pisani was sold in a co-ownership deal to third-tier side S.S. Barletta Calcio ahead of the 2011-12 Lega Pro Prima Divisione season.

=== Serie D ===
In December 2019, Pisani joined Serie D club APC Chions.
