= Lorenzo Ariaudo =

Italian footballer (born 1989)

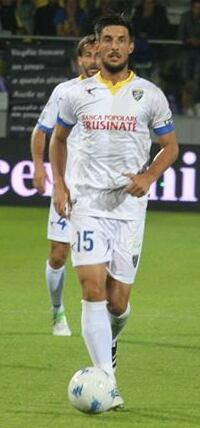

Personal information
- Date of birth: 11 June 1989 (age 37)
- Place of birth: Turin, Italy
- Height: 1.89 m (6 ft 2 in)
- Position: Centre back

Team information
- Current team: Sampdoria (team manager)

Youth career
- –1998: C.B.S. Scuola Calcio
- 1998–2009: Juventus

Senior career*
Years	Team	Apps	(Gls)
2008–2010	Juventus	3	(0)
2010	→ Cagliari (loan)	9	(0)
2010–2014	Cagliari	60	(1)
2014–2016	Sassuolo	18	(0)
2015	→ Genoa (loan)	0	(0)
2016	→ Empoli (loan)	5	(0)
2016–2021	Frosinone	144	(6)
2022	Alessandria	1	(0)
2023	Novara	10	(0)
Total		250	(7)

International career
2009–2010	Italy U21	10	(1)

Managerial career
- 2023–: Sampdoria (team manager)
- * Club domestic league appearances and goals

Lorenzo Ariaudo (born 11 June 1989) is an Italian former professional footballer who played as a centre back, currently he is the team manager of Serie B club Sampdoria.

== Playing career ==
A defender, Ariaudo joined Juventus as a nine-year-old and was part of the 2009 Torneo di Viareggio-winning team. He made his first team debut in Juventus's 1–1 draw with Artmedia Petržalka in the second leg of the 2008–09 UEFA Champions League third qualifying round, in which Juventus won 5–1 on aggregate to advance to the group stages, and was awarded a five-year professional contract. He made Serie A debut on 18 January 2009 against Lazio in Rome in a match that ended with a 1–1 draw. Although he could not permanently break into the first team that season, then-manager Ciro Ferrara described Ariaudo as a future prospect.

After being included in pre-season friendlies, Ariaudo was promoted to the first team permanently. On 2 January 2010, he was loaned to Cagliari for €500,000. After being on the bench for a string of games, he finally made his debut for the Sardinian club on 21 February as a starter and helped keep a clean sheet in a 2–0 win over Parma.

In June 2010, Cagliari excised the rights to purchase him in co-ownership deal for €1.3million. On 31 January 2011, the club purchased him outright, as part of the deal of Alessandro Matri's €2.5million loan.

On 4 January 2014, Ariaudo left Cagliari for Serie A side Sassuolo for €800,000 transfer fee, signing a 3 1/2-year contract.

On 30 January 2015 Ariaudo signed a loan deal with Genoa C.F.C.

In January 2016 he was signed by Empoli.

On 25 February 2022, Ariaudo signed with Alessandria until the end of the season.

On 13 January 2023, Ariaudo joined Novara.

== International career ==
On 25 March 2009 Ariaudo made his debut for the Italy Under-21 squad and marked it with a goal in the friendly game against Austria that ended with a 2–2 draw. He was named in the preliminary squad for the 2009 European Championships but did not make the final 23-man squad. Since then, he has become a regular starter for the Azzurrini in their 2011 European Championship qualifying campaign, playing the full 90 minutes in four of the last five matches since March.

== Post-playing career ==
On 8 August 2023, Sampdoria announced the appointment of Ariaudo as the club's new team manager.

== Career statistics ==
Club	Season	League		Cup		Europe		Other		Total	
Club	Season	Apps	Goals	Apps	Goals	Apps	Goals	Apps	Goals	Apps	Goals
Juventus	2008–09	3	0	2	0	1	0	–		6	0
Juventus	2009–10	0	0	–		0	0	–		0	0
Juventus	Total	3	0	2	0	1	0	–		6	0
Cagliari (loan)	2009–10	9	0	–		–		–		9	0
Cagliari	2010–11	15	0	2	0	–		0	0	15	0
Cagliari	2011–12	24	1	2	0	–		0	0	26	1
Cagliari	2012–13	17	0	0	0	–		0	0	17	0
Cagliari	2013–14	4	0	0	0	–		–		16	0
Cagliari	Total	69	1	4	0	–		–		73	1
Sassuolo	2013–14	12	0	–		–		–		12	0
Sassuolo	2014–15	2	0	1	0	–		–		3	0
Sassuolo	2015–16	4	0	1	0	–		–		5	0
Sassuolo	Total	18	0	2	0	–		–		20	0
Empoli (loan)	2015–16	5	0	–		–		–		5	0
Frosinone	2016–17	37	4	–		–		1 (Note: Appearances in Serie B – Promotion play-offs)	0	38	4
Frosinone	2017–18	34	1	2	0	–		–		36	1
Frosinone	2018–19	19	0	0	0	–		–		19	0
Frosinone	2019–20	34	0	2	1	–		5	0	41	1
Frosinone	2020–21	20	1	0	0	–		–		20	1
Frosinone	Total	144	6	4	1	–		6	0	154	7
Alessandria	2021–22	1	0	–		–		–		1	0
Novara	2022–23	10	0	–		–		1 (Note: Appearances in Serie C – Promotion play-offs)	0	11	0
Career total		250	7	12	1	1	0	7	0	270	8
