= Nicola Ascoli =

Italian footballer

Personal information
- Date of birth: 11 September 1979 (age 47)
- Place of birth: Vibo Valentia, Italy
- Height: 1.85 m (6 ft 1 in)
- Position: Defender

Team information
- Current team: Imperia (head coach)

Youth career
- 1996–1997: Catanzaro

Senior career*
Years	Team	Apps	(Gls)
1997–2005	Catanzaro	174	(5)
2005–2008	Empoli	25	(0)
2008–2011	Frosinone	42	(0)
2011	Universitatea Cluj	5	(0)

Managerial career
- 2012–2014: Asti (sporting director)
- 2014–2015: Asti
- 2015–2017: Argentina
- 2017–2018: Derthona
- 2019–2020: Sanremese
- 2021–: Imperia
- * Club domestic league appearances and goals

Nicola Ascoli (born 11 September 1979) is an Italian football coach and a former player who played as a defender. He is the head coach of Imperia. He spent most of his career playing in Serie B and Serie C.

== Coaching career ==
In 2012, Ascoli became the director of sport at Serie D side Asti and joined the coaching staff under Enrico Pasquali after obtaining his coaching license.

On 14 October 2021, he was appointed head coach of Imperia in Serie D.

== Personal life ==
Ascoli is married to Alessandra Sinopoli, sister-in-law of Juventus and Italy midfielder Claudio Marchisio, his teammate for a season at Empoli. The couple have a daughter.
