= 2008 Torneo di Viareggio =

2008 Torneo Mondiale di Calcio Coppa Carnevale
60° Torneo di Viareggio

Tournament details
- Host country: Italy
- City: Viareggio
- Dates: January 23, 2008 - February 13, 2008
- Teams: 48

Final positions
- Champions: (Italy) Inter Milan
- Runners-up: (Italy) Empoli
- Third place: (Italy) Atalanta
- Fourth place: (Italy) Vicenza

Tournament statistics
- Matches played: 89
- Goals scored: 290 (3.26 per match)
- Top scorer: (Italy) Mario Balotelli (7)

The 2008 winners of the Torneo di Viareggio (in English, the Viareggio Tournament, officially the Viareggio Cup World Football Tournament Coppa Carnevale), the annual youth football tournament held in Viareggio, Tuscany, are listed below.

== Format ==
The 48 teams are seeded in 12 pools, split up into 6-pool groups. Each team from a pool meets the others in a single tie. The winning club from each pool and the two best runners-up from both group A and group B progress to the final knockout stage. All matches in the final rounds are a single tie. The Round of 16 envisions penalties and no extra time, while the rest of the final round matches include 30 minutes extra time and penalties to be played if the draw between teams still holds. Semifinal losing teams play 3rd-place final with penalties after regular time. The winning sides play the final with extra time and repeat the match if the draw holds.

== Participating teams ==
Italian teams

- (Italy) Ascoli
- (Italy) Atalanta
- (Italy) Benevento
- (Italy) Castelnuovo
- (Italy) Cesena
- (Italy) Cisco Roma
- (Italy) Cuoiocappiano
- (Italy) Empoli
- (Italy) Fiorentina
- (Italy) Genoa
- (Italy) Inter Milan
- (Italy) Juventus
- (Italy) Lazio
- (Italy) Massese
- (Italy) Milan
- (Italy) Novara
- (Italy) Parma
- (Italy) Pergocrema
- (Italy) Piacenza
- (Italy) Serie D Representatives
- (Italy) Reggina
- (Italy) Rimini
- (Italy) Roma
- (Italy) Città di San Benedetto
- (Italy) Sampdoria
- (Italy) Sansovino
- (Italy) Siena
- (Italy) Torino
- (Italy) Vicenza

European teams

- (Belgium) Anderlecht
- (North Macedonia) Belasica
- (Slovenia) Interblock Ljubljana
- (Denmark) Midtjylland
- (Greece) Olympiacos
- (Ukraine) Shakhtar Donetsk
- (Czech Republic) Sparta Praha
- (Russia) Spartak Moscow
- (England) Tottenham
- (Hungary) Újpest

Asian teams

- (Malaysia) Malaysian Indian
- (Uzbekistan) Paxtakor

African Team

- (Senegal) A.S. De Camberene
- (Ghana) International Allies

American teams

- (United States) L.I.A.C. of New York
- (Paraguay) Club Guaraní
- (Argentina) River Plate
- (Mexico) Pumas

Oceanian teams

- (Australia) APIA Tigers

== Group stage ==
=== Group 1 ===
Team	Pts	Pld	W	D	L	GF	GA
(Italy) Genoa	7	3	2	1	0	8	3
(Italy) Cisco Roma	6	3	2	0	1	2	3
(England) Tottenham	4	3	1	1	1	11	4
(Australia) APIA Leichhardt Tigers	0	3	0	0	3	1	17

=== Group 2 ===
Team	Pts	Pld	W	D	L	GF	GA
(Italy) Juventus	7	3	2	1	0	12	2
(Mexico) Pumas UNAM	5	3	1	2	0	8	6
(Ghana) International Allies	3	3	1	0	2	3	5
(Italy) Massese	1	3	0	1	2	3	12

=== Group 3 ===
Team	Pts	Pld	W	D	L	GF	GA
(Italy) Milan	7	3	2	1	0	14	1
(Italy) Cesena	5	3	1	2	0	8	2
(North Macedonia) Belasica Strumica	4	3	1	1	1	3	6
(Malaysia) Malaysian Indian	0	3	0	0	3	1	17

=== Group 4 ===
Team	Pts	Pld	W	D	L	GF	GA
(Italy) Atalanta	9	3	3	0	0	7	3
(Hungary) Újpest	4	3	1	1	1	4	5
(Denmark) Midtjylland	3	3	1	0	2	3	2
(Italy) Sansovino	1	3	0	1	2	4	8

=== Group 5 ===
Team	Pts	Pld	W	D	L	GF	GA
(Italy) Empoli	9	3	3	0	0	7	2
(Argentina) River Plate	4	3	1	1	1	8	5
(Italy) Cuoiocappiano	4	3	1	1	1	5	6
(Senegal) A.S. de Camberene	0	3	0	0	3	2	9

=== Group 6 ===
Team	Pts	Pld	W	D	L	GF	GA
(Italy) Ascoli	5	3	1	2	0	3	2
(Ukraine) Shakhtar Donetsk	5	3	1	2	0	3	2
(Italy) Siena	5	3	1	2	0	3	2
(Italy) Roma	0	3	0	0	3	3	5

=== Group 7 ===
Team	Pts	Pld	W	D	L	GF	GA
(Italy) Vicenza	6	3	2	0	1	7	8
(Czech Republic) Sparta Praha	6	3	2	0	1	5	7
(Belgium) Anderlecht	4	3	1	1	1	9	4
(Italy) Pergocrema	1	3	0	1	2	4	6

=== Group 8 ===
Team	Pts	Pld	W	D	L	GF	GA
(Paraguay) Club Guaraní	7	3	2	1	0	5	2
(Italy) Sampdoria	6	3	2	0	1	11	5
(Italy) Parma	4	3	1	1	1	3	1
(Italy) Benevento	0	3	0	0	3	1	12

=== Group 9 ===
Team	Pts	Pld	W	D	L	GF	GA
(Italy) Fiorentina	9	3	3	0	0	13	0
(Slovenia) Interblock Ljubljana	4	3	1	1	1	6	3
(Italy) Sambenedettese	2	3	2	1	2	3	2
(United States) New York Stars	1	3	0	1	2	0	15

=== Group 10 ===
Team	Pts	Pld	W	D	L	GF	GA
(Russia) Spartak Moscow	5	3	1	2	0	6	1
(Italy) Torino	5	3	1	2	0	4	2
(Italy) Castelnuovo	4	3	1	1	1	4	4
(Italy) Rimini	1	3	0	1	2	1	8

=== Group 11 ===
Team	Pts	Pld	W	D	L	GF	GA
(Italy) Inter	9	3	3	0	0	7	2
(Italy) Reggina	6	3	2	0	1	5	2
(Italy) Piacenza	3	3	1	0	2	4	4
(Greece) Olympiacos	0	3	0	0	3	0	8

=== Group 12 ===
Team	Pts	Pld	W	D	L	GF	GA
(Italy) Serie D Repress.	9	3	3	0	0	10	0
(Italy) Lazio	6	3	2	0	1	6	3
(Uzbekistan) Pakhtakor	3	3	1	0	2	1	7
(Italy) Novara	0	3	0	0	3	0	7

== Knockout stage ==
Round of 16
(Italy) Fiorentina	4
(Italy) Genoa	1
(Italy) Empoli (pen)	2
(Italy) Sampdoria	1
(Italy) Milan	0 [3]
(Italy) Vicenza (pen)	0 [4]
(Paraguay) Club Guaraní	1
(Italy) Ascoli	2
(Italy) Inter	4
(Italy) Cisco Roma	3
(Italy) Serie D Selection	3 [6]
(Italy) Cesena (pen)	3 [8]
(Italy) Atalanta (pen)	2 [5]
(Russia) Spartak Moscow	2 [3]
(Italy) Juventus	0
(Italy) Lazio	2

Quarter-finals
(Italy) Fiorentina	1
(Italy) Empoli	2
(Italy) Vicenza (pen)	1 [5]
(Italy) Ascoli	1 [3]
(Italy) Inter (aet)	0 [2]
(Italy) Cesena	0 [0]
(Italy) Atalanta	4
(Italy) Lazio	0

Semi-finals
(Italy) Empoli	2
(Italy) Vicenza	0
(Italy) Atalanta	1
(Italy) Inter	2

Final
(Italy) Empoli	2 [6]
(Italy) Inter (pen)	2 [7]
Third place
(Italy) Atalanta	1
(Italy) Vicenza	0

== Champions ==
Torneo di Viareggio 2008 Champions

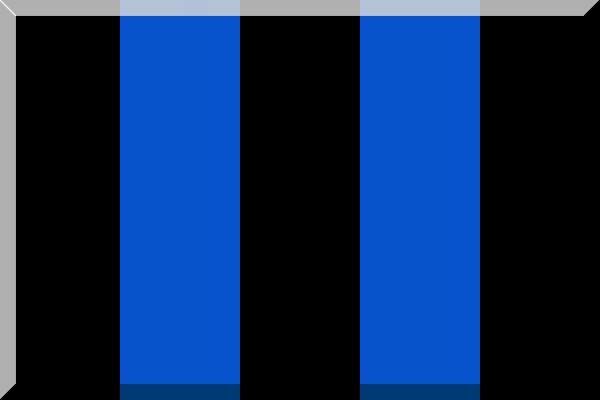

F.C. Internazionale Milan
5th time

== Top goalscorers ==
7 goals

- (Italy) Mario Balotelli ( (Italy) Inter Milan)
- (Italy) Stefano Scappini ( (Italy) Sampdoria)

6 goals

- (Italy) Samuel Di Carmine ( (Italy) Fiorentina)

5 goals

- (Cuba) Samon Reider Rodríguez ( (Italy) Serie D Repress.)
- (Argentina) Emmanuel Ledesma ( (Italy) Genoa)
