= Pietro Zammuto =

Italian footballer

Personal information
- Full name: Pietro Zammuto
- Date of birth: December 23, 1986 (age 39)
- Place of birth: Turin, Italy
- Height: 1.80 m (5 ft 11 in)
- Position: Defender

Team information
- Current team: Treviso

Senior career*
| Years | Team | Apps | (Gls) |
| 2006–2007 | Juventus | | |
| 2006–2007 | → Sambenedettese (loan) | 14 | (0) |
| 2007–2011 | Piacenza | 53 | (2) |
| 2011–2012 | Avellino | 15 | (0) |
| 2012– | Treviso | 15 | (2) |
- * Club domestic league appearances and goals as of half of 2012-2013 season

Pietro Zammuto (born 23 December 1986) is an Italian footballer. He plays for Treviso at Lega Pro Prima Divisione.

Zammuto started his career at Juventus, the giant of his native town. In summer 2006, he moved to Sambenedettese at Serie C1 on loan with an option to sign 50% registration rights at the end of season. In July 2007, Sambenedettese excised the rights to sign 50% but Serie B club Piacenza bought Samb's half for €170,000. In June 2008, Piacenza completed the deal to sign the remain registration rights for another €170,000. On 10 November 2012, him and Kyeremateng joined Serie C club Treviso.
