= Simone Esposito =

Italian professional football player

Personal information
- Full name: Simone Esposito
- Date of birth: 24 May 1990 (age 36)
- Place of birth: Turin, Italy
- Height: 1.71 m (5 ft 7 in)
- Position: Midfielder

Team information
- Current team: Lascaris

Youth career
- 2002–2010: Juventus

Senior career*
Years	Team	Apps	(Gls)
2008–2010	Juventus	0	(0)
2010–2011	→ Ascoli (loan)	4	(0)
2011–2012	→ Reggiana (loan)	27	(0)
2012–2014	Grosseto	8	(0)
2015	Pro Sett Eureka	8	(1)
2015–2016	Pinerolo	50	(6)
2017–	Le Grange Trino		

International career
2006	Italy U-16	13	(1)
2006–2007	Italy U-17	5	(0)
- * Club domestic league appearances and goals as of 20 November 2017

Simone Esposito (born 24 May 1990 in Turin) is an Italian professional football player who currently plays as a midfielder for G.S.D. Lascaris.

== Career ==
=== Juventus ===
Simone Esposito began his youth career with Juventus in 2002, and remained within the club's youth program until 2008. He began to earn first team call-ups by former coach Claudio Ranieri in 2008 and again by Ciro Ferrara in 2009. Esposito made his first team debut on 10 December 2008 in a 2008–09 UEFA Champions League game against FC BATE Borisov. He also played one game in the Coppa Italia. In the summer of 2010, the attacking midfielder officially graduated from the youth team and was promoted into the senior squad. Following his installment, he was instantly loaned out to Serie B side Ascoli Calcio, as part of a player exchange that also was used in an attempt to gain regular playing time. Esposito is one of many Juventus loaners flooding Italian Serie B and Serie C football.

== Club statistics ==
As of 24 August 2010

Club performance			League		Cup		Continental		Total	
Season	Club	League	Apps	Goals	Apps	Goals	Apps	Goals	Apps	Goals
Italy			League		Coppa Italia		Europe		Total	
2008–09	Juventus	Serie A	0	0	0	0	1	0	1	0
2009–10	Juventus	Serie A	0	0	0	0	0	0	0	0
2010–11	Ascoli	Serie B	0	0	1	0	-		1	0
Career total			0	0	1	0	1	0	2	0
