= Rej Volpato =

Italian footballer

Personal information
- Date of birth: 27 August 1986 (age 40)
- Place of birth: Dolo, Italy
- Height: 1.86 m (6 ft 1 in)
- Position: Striker

Senior career*
Years	Team	Apps	(Gls)
2003–2004	Padova	18	(1)
2004–2007	Juventus	0	(0)
2005–2006	→ Siena (loan)	13	(2)
2006–2007	→ Arezzo (loan)	22	(6)
2007–2008	Empoli	13	(0)
2008–2010	Bari	8	(1)
2009	→ Piacenza (loan)	10	(1)
2010	→ Gallipoli (loan)	9	(2)
2010–2012	Livorno	4	(0)
2011	→ Lumezzane (loan)	13	(2)
2012	Pergocrema	9	(0)
- * Club domestic league appearances and goals

Rej Volpato (born 27 August 1986) is an Italian footballer who plays as a striker. He formerly played for the Bianconero youth team.

== Club career ==
He started his professional career at Calcio Padova.

=== Juventus ===
In mid-2004 Volpato was signed by Juventus FC for €400,000 but went on loan to A.C. Siena and A.C. Arezzo in the next two years.

=== Empoli ===
On 4 July 2007, he was signed by Empoli in a co-ownership deal (€500,000) that kept him with the Tuscan team for the 2007–2008 Serie A season, along with fellow Juventus youth players Sebastian Giovinco and Claudio Marchisio, who were on loan. After the three players' successful season in Serie A with Empoli, who eventually were relegated to Serie B anyway, Juventus brought back Volpato, Marchisio, and Giovinco. Volpato's 50% rights was priced €400,000 at that time.

=== Bari ===
Marchisio and Giovinco continued with Juventus, but it was Volpato who was again farmed out, but this time to Serie B side, A.S. Bari in joint-ownership bid, for €500,000, where he will work with head coach, and former Juventus hero Antonio Conte. He along with several other Juventus youth products flood the Serie B, to gain first team experience. In February 2009 he moved from Bari to Piacenza Calcio, in search if more first team action. Juve gave up the remain registration rights to Bari for free in June 2009.

After spending half a season with Serie B side Gallipoli which relegated at the end of season, it saw Volpato make a move to A.S. Livorno Calcio.
