= Riccardo Maniero =

Italian footballer

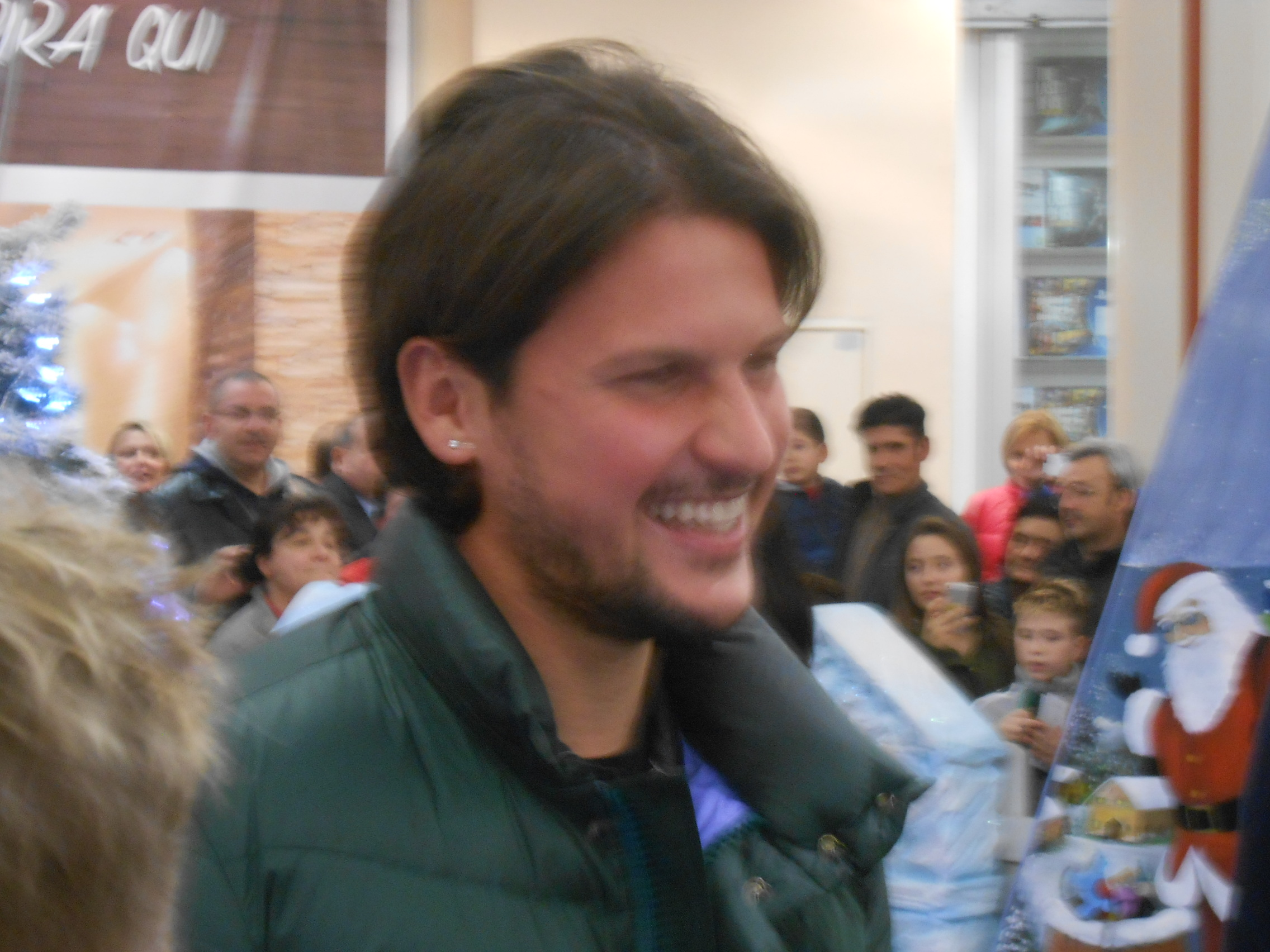

Personal information
- Date of birth: 26 November 1987 (age 38)
- Place of birth: Naples, Italy
- Height: 1.85 m (6 ft 1 in)
- Position: Forward

Youth career
- Juventus

Senior career*
| Years | Team | Apps | (Gls) |
| 2007–2010 | Juventus | 0 | (0) |
| 2007–2008 | → Ascoli (loan) | 20 | (1) |
| 2008–2009 | → Bari (loan) | 0 | (0) |
| 2009 | → Lumezzane (loan) | 13 | (2) |
| 2009–2010 | → Arezzo (loan) | 32 | (12) |
| 2010–2015 | Pescara | 93 | (32) |
| 2012–2013 | → Ternana (loan) | 18 | (2) |
| 2015 | Catania | 20 | (6) |
| 2015–2017 | Bari | 71 | (19) |
| 2017–2019 | Novara | 31 | (4) |
| 2018–2019 | → Cosenza (loan) | 27 | (3) |
| 2019–2020 | Pescara | 30 | (6) |
| 2020–2022 | Avellino | 61 | (21) |
| 2022–2024 | Turris | 66 | (16) |
| 2024–2025 | Savoia | 33 | (17) |
| 2025 | FC Pompei | 13 | (1) |
| 2025–2026 | US Boys Caivanese | | |
| Total | | 528 | (142) |

International career
| 2005–2007 | Italy U20 | 6 | (0) |
- * Club domestic league appearances and goals

Riccardo Maniero (born 26 November 1987) is an Italian former footballer who plays as a forward.

== Career ==
=== Juventus and loans ===
Maniero began his youth career with Juventus in the late 1990s, and was promoted to the Primavera reserve team in 2005. As a player of the under-20 team, Maniero also received some call ups by Didier Deschamps for the senior side in various Coppa Italia and Serie B matches, specifically in matches against AlbinoLeffe, Lecce, and Genoa, appearing as an unused substitute on the bench. This was the season when Juventus were relegated to the second division for the first time in their history following the Calciopoli scandal, and Maniero was eventually part of the team that led Juventus back to Serie A that year.

In June 2007, Maniero was not part of Claudio Ranieri's first team plans and so, he was loaned out to Ascoli, together with fellow Juventus youth player Andrea Luci. With Ascoli, Maniero managed a single goal in 21 league appearances, and following his loan stint with Ascoli, he was again loaned out to another Serie B club Bari, along with fellow Juventus loanees Davide Lanzafame, Raffaele Bianco, and Rej Volpato. While Lanzafame and Bianco established themselves well with the club, Maniero failed to settle and gain regular action, as the attacker made zero official appearances in six months with the biancorossi.

Following his disappointing spell with Bari, Maniero was sub-loaned out to Italian third division side, Lumezzane. During his loan period with Lumezzane, Maniero made his first 13 league appearances, and he also scored 2 goals.

In July 2009, another third division club Arezzo officially announced the engagement of Maniero. Maniero had a successful season with the Lega Pro Prima Divisione side, establishing himself as a starter and scoring 12 goals in 31 league appearances.

=== Pescara ===
In August 2010 Maniero joined Pescara ahead of the 2010–11 Serie B campaign in co-ownership deal, for €450,000. Co-currently Juventus signed Luca Del Papa from Pescara also in co-ownership deal for €300,000. On the same day Pescara signed Raffaele Alcibiade in temporary deal from Juve. Maniero, however, failed to score regularly in Serie B. On 31 August 2012 he left for Serie B newcomer Ternana after Maniero was excluded from Pescara's Serie A plan. Ternana also got midfielder Antonino Ragusa and defender Riccardo Brosco from Pescara on the same day.

On 19 June 2013 the co-ownership between Pescara and Juventus were terminated, which saw Maniero now 100% under Pescara's contract for free as well as Del Papa under Juve for €100,000.

=== Catania ===
On 14 January 2015 he was signed by Calcio Catania. He wore no.7 shirt for his new team, vacated by Marcelinho. Catania was expelled (relegated) from 2015–16 Serie B due to a match-fixing scandal.

=== Bari ===
On 31 August 2015 Maniero was signed by Serie B club Bari.

=== Novara ===
On 4 August 2017 Maniero was signed by another Serie B club Novara.

=== Return to Pescara ===
On 18 July 2019, he returned to Pescara.

=== Avellino ===
On 11 September 2020 he signed a 3-year contract with Avellino.
