= Carlo Vecchione =

Italian footballer (born 1988)

Personal information
- Date of birth: 27 June 1988 (age 38)
- Place of birth: Naples, Italy
- Height: 1.75 m (5 ft 9 in)
- Position: Midfielder

Team information
- Current team: Clermont Foot
- Number: 27

Youth career
- 2002–2009: Juventus

Senior career*
Years	Team	Apps	(Gls)
2009–	Juventus	0	(0)
2009–	→ Clermont Foot (loan)	7	(0)
- * Club domestic league appearances and goals as of 16:11, 13 November 2009 (UTC)

Carlo Vecchione (born 27 June 1988) is an Italian professional football player. Currently, he plays as a midfielder in the Ligue 2 for Clermont Foot on loan from Italian club Juventus FC

== Career ==
=== Juventus ===
Vecchione started his career working his way through the Juventus youth ranks, before he made his way to the "Primavera" youth squad in 2008. He never managed a senior team debut with Juventus during the season, but after graduating the youth team in July 2009, he was loaned out to French side, Clermont Foot. After one season with the club, he made 7 appearances, and returned to Juventus on 31 May 2010.
