= Samon Reider Rodríguez =

Cuban footballer

Personal information
- Date of birth: 28 October 1988 (age 38)
- Place of birth: Guantánamo, Cuba
- Height: 1.71 m (5 ft 7 in)
- Position: Forward

Team information
- Current team: Gelbison
- Number: 99

Youth career
- 2002–2003: Castelfiorentino
- 2003–2007: Juventus

Senior career*
Years	Team	Apps	(Gls)
2007–2010	Juventus	0	(0)
2007–2008	→ Cecina (loan)	10	(1)
2008–2009	→ Poggibonsi (loan)	15	(1)
2009–2010	→ Alessandria (loan)	28	(5)
2010–2011	Pergocrema	15	(2)
2011	Bassano	10	(0)
2011–2012	→ Casale (loan)	16	(3)
2012–2013	Matera	7	(1)
2013–2017	Castelfiorentino		(53)
2017–2018	Seravezza Pozzi	45	(27)
2019	Olhanense	14	(8)
2019	Reggiana	4	(0)
2019–2020	Audace Cerignola	18	(15)
2020–2021	Casarano	30	(10)
2021	Lavello	10	(2)
2021–2022	Seravezza Pozzi		
2022	Livorno	9	(2)
2022–2023	Real Forte Querceta	9	(0)
2023–	Gelbison	5	(1)
- * Club domestic league appearances and goals as of 7 January 2023

Samon Reider Rodríguez (born 28 October 1988) is a Cuban footballer who plays as a forward for Italian Serie D Group H club Gelbison.

== Youth career ==
Although born in Cuba, Rodríguez started his career at Italy for Castelfiorentino and following several impressive seasons with the club's youth system, he was signed by Serie A club, Juventus on 10 July 2003.

Rodríguez remained in the youth setup for 4 seasons. In 2006-07 season, he occasionally trained with first team and was awarded the no.39 shirt, by then Juventus coach Didier Deschamps. He also played at Campionato Nazionale Primavera before leaving on loan to Serie D side Cecina, where he was selected for the 2008 Torneo di Viareggio for Serie D selection. He scored 5 goals in 4 matches, which he scored a hat-trick against Novara's Berretti under-20 team and two goals against Pakhtakor's youth team. With Cecina, he scored 1 goal in 10 appearances.

== Career ==
In 2008 season he signed a 3-year contract extension with Juventus, the maximum length granted he could sign and left on loan to Poggibonsi, where in 5 months, he made 15 appearances with one goal. In the mid-season he returned to Juve and then left for Alessandria and his loan was extended in July 2009. With Alessandria, the young midfielder managed to make 31 appearances in all competitions, scoring 6 goals.

On 12 August 2010, Rodríguez joined Prima Divisione side Pergocrema in co-ownership deal. On 31 January 2011, Pergocrema's half was transferred to Bassano in exchange for the loan of Marco Criaco. In June Bassano acquired the remain 50% registration rights from Juventus.

On 25 July 2011 he left for Casale. On 7 July Siracusa also announced the signing of Rodríguez but never turned official.

On 27 August 2012 he signed for Serie D club Matera.

He eventually returned to former club Castelfiorentino in the Eccellenza. After four years, he signed for Seravezza Pozzi in the Serie D.

On 15 January 2019, Rodríguez signed for Portuguese side Olhanense.

On 23 September 2019, he was released from his contract with Reggiana by mutual consent.

On 1 October 2019 he joined Serie D club Audace Cerignola. In the first part of the season (before the definitive stop of the championships due to Covid-19) the player scored 14 goals.

On 9 August 2020 he joined Serie D club Casarano.

In July 2022, Rodríguez signed for newly-promoted Serie D club Livorno, being however released later in December of that year.
