= Claudio Marchisio =

Italian footballer (born 1986)

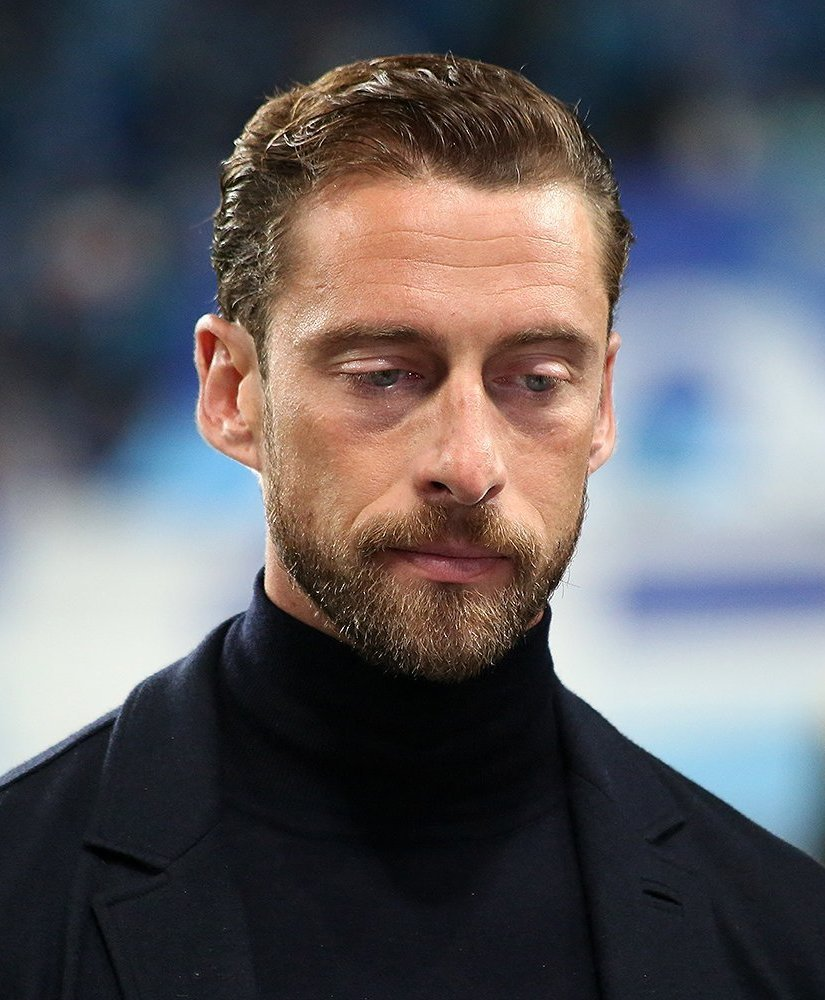
- Marchisio in 2021

Personal information
- Full name: Claudio Marchisio
- Date of birth: 19 January 1986 (age 40)
- Place of birth: Turin, Italy
- Height: 1.80 m (5 ft 11 in)
- Position: Midfielder

Youth career
- 1993–2005: Juventus

Senior career*
| Years | Team | Apps | (Gls) |
| 2005–2018 | Juventus | 294 | (33) |
| 2007–2008 | → Empoli (loan) | 26 | (0) |
| 2018–2019 | Zenit Saint Petersburg | 9 | (2) |
| Total | | 329 | (35) |

International career
| 2007–2008 | Italy U21 | 14 | (1) |
| 2009–2017 | Italy | 55 | (5) |
Medal record
Men's Football
Representing Italy
UEFA European Championship
| Runner-up | 2012 Poland–Ukraine |
FIFA Confederations Cup
| Third place | 2013 Brazil |
- * Club domestic league appearances and goals

Claudio Marchisio (Italian pronunciation: [ˈklaudjo marˈkiːzjo]; born 19 January 1986) is an Italian former professional footballer who played as a midfielder.

A product of the Juventus youth system, he spent a large portion of his career at his hometown club, with the exception of a season-long loan spell at Empoli, winning seven consecutive Serie A titles between 2012 and 2018, and four consecutive Coppa Italia titles between 2015 and 2018. He was the club's second vice-captain, behind Giorgio Chiellini, before his contract was terminated in 2018 and then signed with Russian club Zenit Saint Petersburg, where he stayed for one season, before retiring from professional football in 2019.

At the international level, Marchisio has represented Italy at the 2008 Summer Olympics, and at the 2010 and 2014 FIFA World Cups; he also took part at UEFA Euro 2012, winning a runners-up medal, and at the 2013 FIFA Confederations Cup, where he won a third-place medal. In total, he made 55 appearances for Italy at senior level between 2009 and 2017, scoring five goals.

After making his breakthrough in the 2008–09 season, Marchisio was often compared to former Juventus and Italian midfielder Marco Tardelli by the Italian press, due to his energy, tenacious style of play, and good reading of the game, as well as his ability to seamlessly switch between offence and defence. His preferred position was in central midfield but his versatility led to him playing in a variety of positions in midfield throughout his career to suit various formations.

== Early life ==
Born in Turin, to a father from Piedmont and a mother from Sicily, Marchisio is the youngest of three children and was raised in the comuni of Chieri and Andezeno, where his parents run a family business and continue to reside. His family were Juventus fans and season ticket holders and he used to be a ball boy at the Stadio delle Alpi. As a child, he was interested in various sports and joined the youth football team at Fiat's satellite sports club Sisport, where he was later scouted by Juventus youth coaches at the age of seven. A talented middle-distance runner and skier, he began vocational training as a surveyor after the mandatory schooling age of 16, in case his football career did not work out, but eventually dropped out to concentrate on football.

== Club career ==
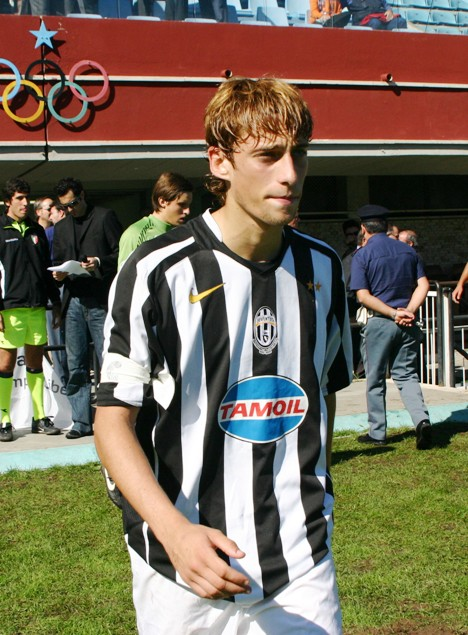
Marchisio in 2005

=== Youth and early career with Juventus ===
While in the youth system, Marchisio played as a forward and as a trequartista (offensive midfielder), modeling himself after his childhood hero Alessandro Del Piero, until he was switched to a deeper midfield role at the age of 16, due to his slender physique. During the 2004–05 and 2005–06 seasons, he was called up to train with the first team numerous times by Fabio Capello and given a squad number. He made the bench for the game away at Cagliari but remained an unused substitute. Later that season, he captained the Primavera side to their first Campionato Nazionale Primavera title in 12 years and a runner-up finish at the Viareggio Tournament in his last full season with the Primavera squad.

After being included in the preseason friendlies, Marchisio was promoted to the first team permanently following Juventus' relegation to Serie B due to the Calciopoli scandal and given the number 15 shirt. On 19 August 2006, he made his first team debut in the Coppa Italia third round, coming on as a late substitute for Matteo Paro in a 3–0 win over Martina. In September, he captained the Primavera team for the last time in the Supercoppa Primavera, thrashing old rivals Internazionale 5–1. He then made his league debut on 28 October against Frosinone as a late substitute for David Trezeguet and made his first start in the following match against Brescia. As the season progressed, he established himself in Didier Deschamps' side and ended the season as first-choice central midfielder. He capped a fine season with an assist for Del Piero's match opener in the 5–1 thrashing of Arezzo, a result which secured immediate promotion to Serie A mathematically.

=== Loan to Empoli ===
On 25 July 2007, Marchisio was loaned out to Empoli for the 2007–08 season with good friend and fellow youth product Sebastian Giovinco to gain first-team experience. He made his Serie A debut on 26 August against Fiorentina and European debut the following month in the UEFA Cup against FC Zürich. Although he did not score any goals, he tallied two vital assists and was a regular starter when available for the Tuscan club under both Luigi Cagni and Alberto Malesani. Unfortunately, Empoli were unable to avoid relegation and he was recalled to Turin by the recently appointed manager Claudio Ranieri.

=== Return to Juventus and breakthrough ===
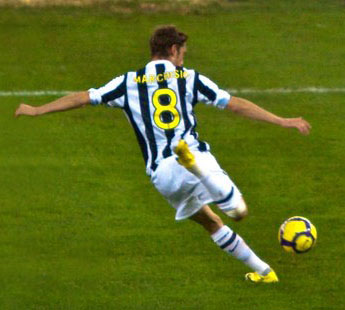
Marchisio playing for Juventus in 2009, in a match against Bari

After his impressive performances for Empoli, Marchisio returned to Juventus for the 2008–09 campaign and made an impressive Champions League debut, playing the full 90 minutes against Artmedia Petržalka in the Champions League third qualifying round, second leg. In November, former Milan and Fiorentina striker Stefano Borgonovo wrote about him on La Gazzetta dello Sport: "Marchisio has everything needed to play at the highest level...[He] has personality, reminds me of the great Marco Tardelli." Under Ranieri, he eventually established himself as first-choice due to injuries and lackluster performances from other midfielders. He further established himself in the starting eleven after a man-of-the-match game against Milan in pouring rain that earned him rave reviews from the media. He quickly became a firm favourite amongst the Bianconeri fans and they voted him as their Player of the Month for December on the club website. Five days after his 23rd birthday, he scored his first Serie A goal, the match-winner against Fiorentina. Less than a week later, he was rewarded with an improved five-year contract extension. His season was interrupted by a series of minor injuries in April, which resulted in him being sidelined for almost a month, and he returned to the starting eleven for the penultimate matchday away at Siena, marking it with a goal and an assist for captain Alessandro Del Piero's second goal of the match in a 0–3 win and then setting up Vincenzo Iaquinta's opener in a 2–0 home win against Lazio, a result that ensured a second-place finish for the Bianconieri. When the season ended, he was continuously linked with various clubs, but Director of Sport Alessio Secco ended all speculation by listing him as one of the "untouchable" players. His good performances did not go unnoticed by the Italy national team coach Marcello Lippi, who later handed him his senior international debut.

=== Post-calciopoli struggles ===
Marchisio continued to be first choice under Ciro Ferrara and later Alberto Zaccheroni mainly due to his versatility and consistency in midfield. During the beginning of the 2009–10 season, he had a good run of form, winning Man of the Match awards in four consecutive matches and being voted Player of the Month for September by registered members on the club website but picked up a knee injury in the loss to Palermo at the beginning of October. After surgery, he was sidelined for one month and a half and made his comeback as a last-minute substitute in the Champions League group stage tie away at Bordeaux on 25 November. On 5 December 2009, he scored the winner in a 2–1 home win over Internazionale in the Derby d'Italia, where he showed incredible composure to drag the ball with both feet before dinking it over the stranded Júlio César. Three days later, he set up David Trezeguet to score the opening goal of the game in the decisive Champions League 1–4 home loss against Bayern Munich. At the end of the year, he was voted Juventus Player of the Year for 2009 by fans on the club website. In the Europa League round of 16 tie against Fulham on 11 March 2010, he captained the team for the first time when David Trezeguet handed him the captain's armband after being substituted at the 62nd minute, as vice-captains Gianluigi Buffon and Giorgio Chiellini missed the match through injury and Del Piero remained an unused substitute. He scored an equalizer against Catania on the second-last away matchday to keep Juventus in a Europa League spot and, despite Juventus' dismal season, was one of the few players to escape the mass criticism from the press.

Despite a disappointing 2010 FIFA World Cup campaign, Marchisio began the season as first-choice under new manager Luigi Delneri. After a slow start to the season, he began to thrive in his role as a wide midfielder. In September, he marked his 100th appearance in a Juventus shirt with a goal against Udinese in a 4–0 win. He started his first match as captain against Roma in April. On 17 May 2011, Juventus announced that Marchisio had signed an improved, five-year contract with the club. His semi-bicycle kick goal against Udinese in January was voted Goal of the Season by fans on fansite vecchiasignora.com.

=== Return to victory ===
==== 2011–12 season ====
Marchisio started the 2011–12 season well by scoring Juve's final goal in the opening match of the campaign at the club's new stadium, a 4–1 home win over Parma on 11 September 2011. Under former Juventus legend Antonio Conte, he was played alongside new signings Arturo Vidal and Andrea Pirlo to great effect and were dubbed the "M-V-P" midfield by the press and fans. He scored a late double to break the deadlock in the 2–0 win at home against Milan, the first time he has ever scored more than one goal in a match. On 20 November, he scored in his second consecutive league game and surpassed his personal season record of four goals by scoring the last goal in a 3–0 win over Palermo. He scored his first Coppa Italia goal, the match winning goal against Bologna in extra time to send Juve to the quarter-finals. His good form during the first half of the season earned him a nomination for the Serie A Italian Footballer of the Year award and a place in the Serie A Team of the Year. On 18 March, he ended a three-month goal drought with a header in the 5–0 thrashing at Fiorentina and dedicated it his second son, who was born earlier that week. He scored his ninth goal of the season against Lecce in his 200th career match to take his goal tally for the season into the double figures. The following match, he won his first Scudetto after Juve won 2–0 against Cagliari and runners-up Milan lost 4–2 in the Milan Derby against Inter, although Juventus were defeated in the Coppa Italia Final by Napoli. He ended the season with ten goals in league and cup matches.

==== 2012–13 season ====
With the departure of captain and club legend Alessandro Del Piero in June 2012, it was speculated that Marchisio would "inherit" the number 10 jersey but he declined, stating that he was a midfielder, not a striker, and had grown accustomed to his number 8. He captained the team on the opening match of the season against Parma in the absence of captain Gianluigi Buffon and first vice-captain Giorgio Chiellini. In November, he scored his first-ever goal in a UEFA club competition in the Champions League group stage home fixture against Nordsjælland. He also assisted Fabio Quagliarella's equaliser against Chelsea. He was one of four Juventus players nominated for the 2012 UEFA Team of the Year and was voted into the Serie A Team of the Year at the Oscar del Calcio awards. Although he played fewer matches compared to last season due to suspension and a minor injury, he contributed crucial goals to his side, including the match winner against Siena and a brace against intercity rivals Torino as Juve won a second consecutive league title. Marchisio also scored in the first leg against Celtic in the Champions League round of 16, which Juventus eventually won 5–0 on aggregate to progress on to the quarter-final stage, where they were eliminated by eventual champions Bayern Munich.

==== 2013–14 season ====
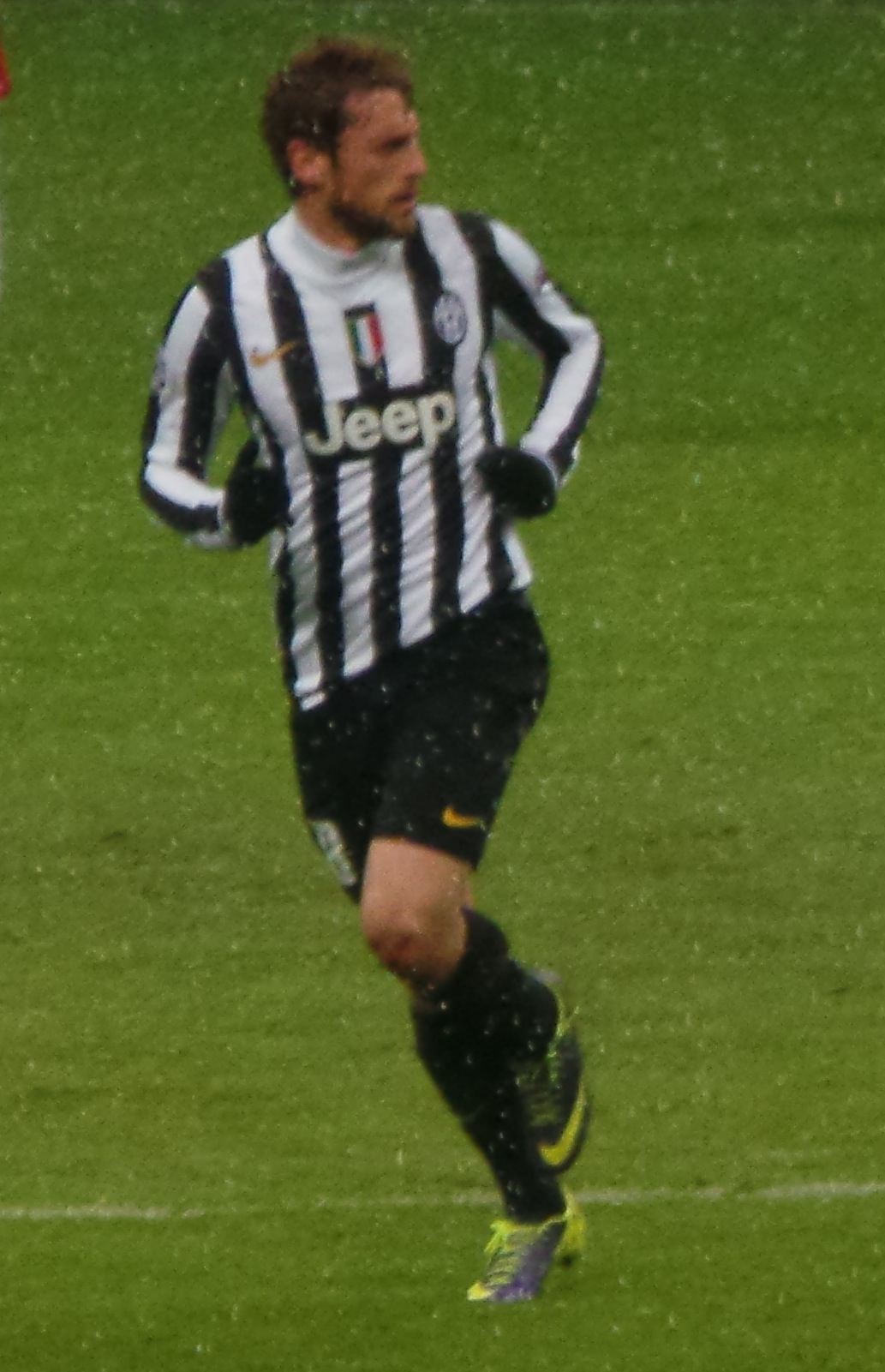
Marchisio with Juve in 2013

During the 2013–14 season, Marchisio was mostly competing with French youngster Paul Pogba for a spot in the midfield three. He struggled with an injury sustained during the club's 2013 Supercoppa Italiana victory, and was mainly used as a substitute during the first half of the season during league games, starting in Champions League/Europa League matches instead. Partly due to Arturo Vidal's absence due to knee surgery, Marchisio started more matches in the last few months of the season – his four goals all came during the latter half of the season. In April against Bologna he made his career 200th Serie A appearance. He scored Juve's last goal of the season on the last matchday of the season, a 3–0 win over Cagliari. Juventus were able to win their third consecutive title that season, and their 30th overall, with an Italian record of 102 points. Juventus were eliminated in the group stage of the Champion's League, however, although they managed to reach the semi-finals of the Europa League, where they were defeated by Benfica.

==== 2014–15 season ====
The 2014–15 season was a watershed season for the midfielder as he reached several milestones: his 200th (Serie A) and 300th (all competitions) appearances for Juve and first Coppa Italia title and Champions League final appearance. Marchisio scored his first goal of the 2014–15 season, under new manager Massimiliano Allegri, on 13 September, a 2–0 home win over Udinese. On 15 February 2015, he made his 200th appearance in Serie A with Juventus, scoring a goal in a 2–2 draw against Cesena. On 7 April 2015, Marchisio returned from a short injury lay-off for the second leg of the semi-finals of the Coppa Italia against Fiorentina and made an immediate impact, sending in the cross which led to Alessandro Matri's opening goal and setting up Leonardo Bonucci's goal from a corner in a 3–0 win, which allowed Juventus to progress to the final of the competition. However, his yellow card in the game meant that he would be suspended for the final, a 2–1 extra time victory over Lazio. Marchisio made his 300th appearance in all competitions for Juventus in a 3–2 home win against Fiorentina on 29 April. In the absence of Andrea Pirlo due to injury, Marchisio occasionally deputised as designated corner and indirect free kick taker. On 2 May, he took part in Juventus's 1–0 win over Sampdoria, which allowed the club to capture the Serie A title for a fourth consecutive time. On 16 May, he scored the winner against Inter in the Derby d'Italia, the first time he has scored from the penalty spot during a match. In the Champions League Final loss to Barcelona, he started the counterattack with a backheel pass that led to Álvaro Morata's equalizer, but the eventual winners scored two more goals to win 3–1. With 52 appearances, Marchisio was one of three players, the other two being Bonucci and Argentine midfielder Roberto Pereyra, to make the most appearances for Juventus across all competitions that season. Although he did not score as many goals as in previous three seasons, he tallied the second most assists, only one less than top scorer Carlos Tevez. He was named in the UEFA Champions League squad of the season and voted Player of the Season for 2014–15 by registered users of vecchiasignora.com, the largest Italian-language Juventus fansite.

==== 2015–16 season ====
At the end of the season, Marchisio was the subject of transfer rumours as his present contract was due to expire next summer. On 6 July 2015, however, he signed a five-year extension, keeping him at his hometown club until the 2019–20 season. Marchisio was ruled out for a month after sustaining an injury to an adductor muscle in his right leg in his first league appearance of the season on 12 September 2015, as Juventus drew 1–1 at home to Chievo. On 24 November, Marchisio was nominated for the 2015 UEFA Team of the Year. On 15 March 2016 it was announced Marchisio would miss the second round of 16 leg of the Champions League against Bayern Munich on 16 March due to a muscular problem in his left calf. He returned to action on 2 April, in a 1–0 home victory over Empoli. Two weeks later on 17 April, Marchisio suffered an anterior cruciate ligament injury during Juventus' 4–0 home victory over Palermo after an awkward fall with a challenge on Franco Vázquez, which ruled him out for the rest of the season as well as the upcoming UEFA Euro 2016 tournament. After a successful surgery to his left knee on 19 April, it was confirmed he would be sidelined for six months. After Juventus clinched their record fifth consecutive Serie A title on 25 April, the club's captain and goalkeeper Buffon dedicated the victory to Marchisio.

==== 2016–17 season ====
On 26 October 2016, Marchisio returned to the pitch after six months on the sidelines in a 4–1 home win over Sampdoria. He scored his first goal since his injury in the 3–1 win away at Sevilla during the Champions League group stage. The season saw Marchisio reach two milestones. On 15 April 2017, he made his 250th Serie A appearance for Juventus in a 2–0 away win over Pescara. On 21 May 2017, he started in the last home fixture of the season against Crotone, which Juventus won 3–0 to seal a historic sixth consecutive Scudetto, which made Marchisio one of only six players to have been in the squad for all six successful seasons. On 3 June, Marchisio came on as a substitute in his second Champions League Final in three years, but Juventus were defeated 4–1 by defending champions Real Madrid.

==== 2017–18 season ====
Marchisio sustained another knee injury during the first match of the 2017–18 season on 19 August against Cagliari. He did not make it to the starting line up until 5 November, in a 2–1 home win over Benevento. Just before the start of the 2018–19 season, on 17 August 2018, it was announced that Marchisio had left Juventus following "the agreed termination" of his contract, which ended the 25 years Marchisio spent in the Juventus system. In total, he made 389 appearances for the club, scoring 37 goals, providing 43 assists, and picking up only one red card.

=== Zenit Saint Petersburg ===
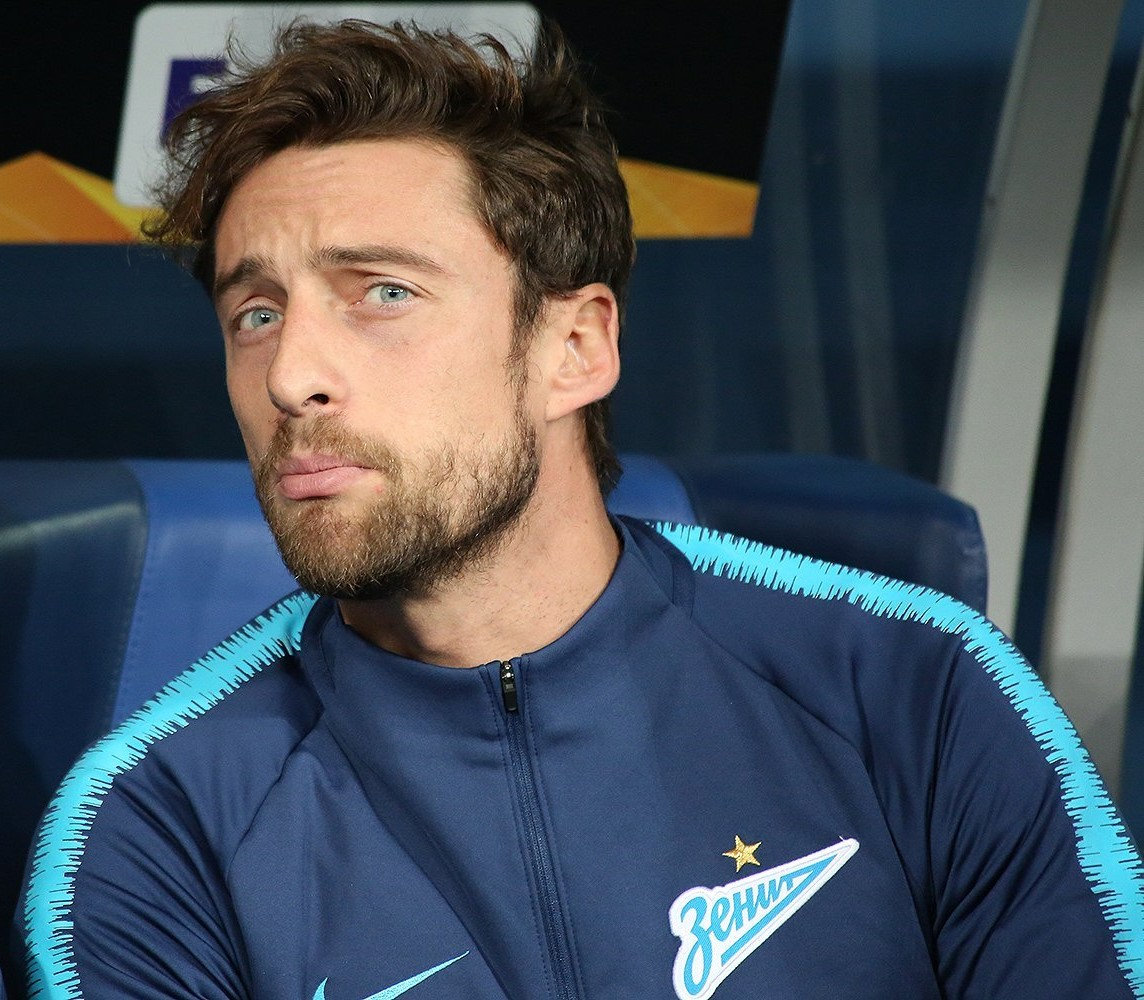
Marchisio with Zenit Saint Petersburg in November 2018, prior to a Champions League match

On 3 September 2018, he signed a two-year contract with the Russian Premier League club Zenit Saint Petersburg. On 16 September 2018, Marchisio made his debut for Zenit in a 2–1 away win over Orenburg, coming on as a substitute in the 71st minute. On 1 July 2019, Zenit announced that Marchisio had left the club after his contract was terminated by mutual consent.

On 3 October 2019, Marchisio held a press conference at Juventus Stadium, where he announced his retirement from football.

== International career ==
=== Youth career ===
Marchisio was initially called up in early May to the Italy under-21 squad for the 2007 European Championships but eventually withdrew due to injury. He made his under-21 debut in June 2007, the group opening game of the 2009 European Championship qualifying, but his debut ended rather unfortunately as he was injured in a collision barely ten minutes into the match while attempting an effort on goal, although the shot would lead to Robert Acquafresca's opener seconds later. Eventually, he became first-choice during the latter stages of the campaign. He scored a 12-yard volley at the 2008 Toulon Tournament against Turkey in a 2–1 win, as Italy went on to win the tournament, and was subsequently called up to the Olympics that summer but was forced to return home due to an injury. In May 2009, Pierluigi Casiraghi named him in the final squad for the 2009 Under-21 European Championship. At the tournament, he started every game and, despite missing the semi-final loss to Germany through suspension, was one of several Azzurrini stars tipped to make the senior squad, also being named to the Team of the Tournament.

=== Senior debut and 2010 World Cup ===
On 12 August 2009, Marchisio made his senior debut, starting in the friendly against Switzerland that ended goalless and was praised by Marcello Lippi during the post-match interview. Lippi later revealed that he had intended to call Marchisio up earlier but agreed to leave the youngster to Casiraghi's U-21 squad until the end of the European Championships. Marchisio played his first competitive match for the Azzurri in the World Cup qualifier against Bulgaria in his home stadium and became a first-choice pick for Lippi's squad. He was forced to withdraw, however, from the remaining qualifying matches against the Republic of Ireland and Cyprus after being diagnosed with a knee meniscus injury that required surgery. He was named in the 23-man squad for the 2010 World Cup, but had a relatively uneventful tournament due to Lippi's preference for playing him in an unfamiliar playmaker role in a 4–2–3–1 formation that he had not used in the lead-up to the tournament. The defending champions drew 1–1 with both Paraguay and New Zealand before losing 3–2 to Slovakia, finishing bottom of their group, and were eliminated in the first round.

=== Euro 2012 and 2013 Confederations Cup ===
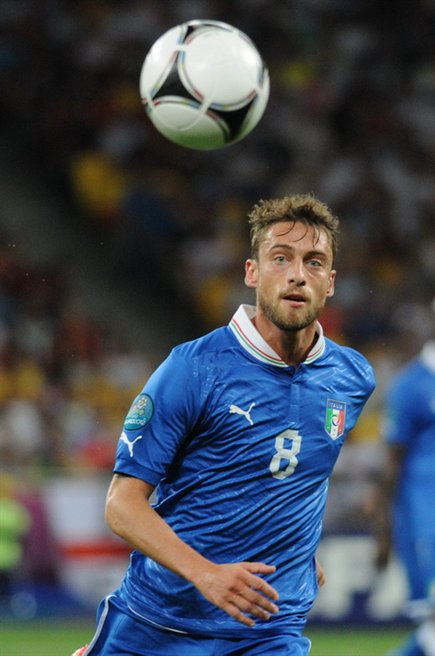
Marchisio in Italy's Euro 2012 quarter-final match against England

Marchisio scored his first ever international goal in the Euro 2012 qualifier against Serbia on 7 October 2011, barely a minute after kick-off. It was the 250th goal scored by a Juventus player for the Italy national team.

After a good 2011–12 season with Juventus, and a successful qualifying campaign with Italy, Marchisio was named in the final squad for UEFA Euro 2012 by Cesare Prandelli, and he started every match alongside Andrea Pirlo and Daniele De Rossi in midfield, in Italy's surprise run to the final, where they were defeated 4–0 by reigning European and world champions Spain.

Under Prandelli, Marchisio became an established member of the Italy national team, and he was named in the final squad for the 2013 FIFA Confederations Cup, in which Italy finished third. Marchisio came on as a substitute and assisted Sebastian Giovinco's match winning goal in Italy's second group match against Japan, which allowed Italy to advance to the semi-finals of the Confederations Cup for the first time in their history. Italy managed to finish the tournament in third place, following a 3–2 penalty shootout win over Uruguay in the bronze medal match.

=== 2014 World Cup ===
After becoming a regular during Italy qualifying matches, Marchisio was later also selected to be a member of the Italy squad that would take part at the 2014 FIFA World Cup. On 30 May 2014, he captained the senior team for the first time during the pre-World Cup friendly against the Republic of Ireland after Riccardo Montolivo, captain for the match, was carried off the pitch due to a fractured leg.

At the 2014 FIFA World Cup, Marchisio scored his first international goal at a major UEFA/FIFA tournament and Italy's first goal of the World Cup, a 25-yard shot against England during the Group D second opening match in an eventual 2–1 win. He appeared in Italy's next two group matches, which both ended in 1–0 defeats, to group winners Costa Rica, and runner's up Uruguay respectively. In the final group match against Uruguay, he was controversially given a straight red card in the 59th minute by referee Marco Antonio Rodríguez for an alleged foul on Egidio Arévalo Ríos, his only red card as an international. The referee's failure to send Luis Suárez off for biting Giorgio Chiellini, and the fact that Uruguay went on to win 1–0 after scoring from a corner immediately following the later incident, further added to the controversy. Italy finished third in their group and were eliminated from the World Cup in the group stage for the second time in a row.

=== Post World Cup and injury struggles ===
On 27 March 2015, Marchisio suffered an injury during a training session with the Italy national team, prior to the Euro 2016 qualifying match against Bulgaria. Although it was initially feared that he had torn his anterior cruciate ligament (ACL), which would have ruled him out for six months, it was later confirmed that the injury was a sprain, and that he would only be out for several weeks. However, his former Juventus coach Antonio Conte, now the national team coach, reportedly received death threats from irate Juventus fans and was publicly criticised by John Elkann, the president of the holding company which controls FIAT and Juventus and cousin of club president Andrea Agnelli. After rupturing his anterior cruciate ligament in April 2016, Marchisio was ruled out of UEFA Euro 2016.

Under Conte's successor, manager Gian Piero Ventura, Marchisio appeared as a starter in a 3–0 friendly victory over Uruguay at the Allianz Riviera stadium in Nice, held on 7 June 2017, but was replaced by Riccardo Montolivo in the first half after sustaining an injury; this was his final international appearance.

In total, Marchisio made 55 appearances for Italy between 2009 and 2017, scoring five goals.

== Style of play ==
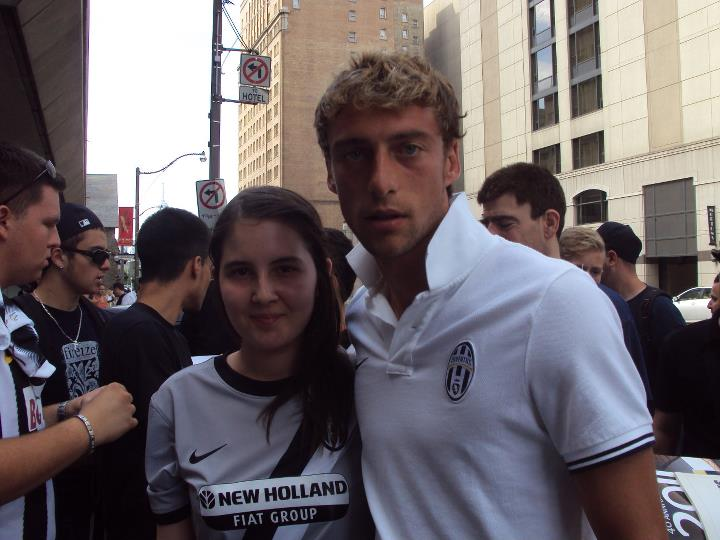
Claudio Marchisio posing for a picture with a fan in Toronto in 2011

Marchisio is known for his versatility and ability to play anywhere in midfield, as seen in various formations and positions he has been played in by his coaches. He has been used out wide in both a three- or four-man midfield, or as a defensive midfielder, but his preferred and most effective position is that of a central midfielder, where he is given the license to freely switch between defensive and attacking positions, instead of being limited to a single role. He is sometimes classified as an attacking central midfielder (known as a mezz'ala in Italian football), due to his penchant for scoring goals, rather than as a traditional deep-lying "creative" central midfielder (known as a regista in Italian football) in the mold of Andrea Pirlo. In the English language media he has been described as a "box-to-box midfielder" as he is neither a pure defensive nor an attacking midfielder, although he is able to play in both positions when necessary. A former forward, with an eye for goal, he has also been fielded in more advanced roles, as a deep-lying forward or attacking midfielder in a 3–5–1–1 formation. Regarded as a precocious talent in his youth since his emergence in Juventus's starting line-up, Marchisio's physical strength, pace, energy, positional sense and tactical awareness in his prime allowed him to excel in the centre in a box-to-box midfield role, and enabled him to establish himself as one of the top midfielders of his generation. However, he has been injury prone and his injury struggles eventually necessitated his switch from a box-to-box role which required more running into a deeper role.

Known for his adaptability, Marchisio's role has evolved over the years as managerial styles and tactics have changed. During the early years of his career, he was paired in the centre alongside a defensive midfielder such as Felipe Melo in a four-man midfield and was left to play more of an offensive and creative role. During the 2011–12 season at club level, he was deployed effectively alongside Pirlo and Chilean international Arturo Vidal in Juventus's three-man midfield in their 3–5–2 formation under Conte. A large part of Juventus's success in Italy that season was due to the fact that Marchisio and Vidal were able to interchange quickly between defensive and attacking positions on both ends of the pitch and compensate for Pirlo's defensive weaknesses by leaving playmaking duties to the latter; this formation allowed all three midfielders to contribute with 19 league goals, almost a third of all goals scored by the team that season, as they went on to win the league. Under Prandelli's tenure with the Italy national team, Marchisio has played a similar role in supporting Pirlo alongside Roma midfielder Daniele De Rossi, and has also played as a false-attacking midfielder on occasion. Between 2014 and 2015, with Massimiliano Allegri's switch in tactics and Pirlo's subsequent departure, Marchisio shifted into a deeper role, usually in front of the defenders to provide a link between defence and offence and utilize his passing ability without the need to constantly spread himself across both ends of the pitch.

There are few flashy moments, few showpiece 30-yarders or slaloming runs past four challenges. Instead, he’s consistent, a sort of Italian Denis Irwin: lots of matches where the good work goes unnoticed, plenty of seven/eight out of 10 showings.

— Alex Richards, Daily Mirror

One of Marchisio's key strengths is his ability to switch from defence to offence seamlessly after winning back the ball, while remaining tactically disciplined in either role; his athleticism, tackling, vision, range of passing, and good reading of the game enables him to break down the opposition's play, and quickly transition the ball forward to create chances for his more attack-minded teammates. Marchisio is also gifted with flair, agility, and excellent technique, as well as good dribbling skills and close control in tight spaces. These attributes, as well as his ability to pass and shoot with both feet, despite being naturally right-footed, make him a threat in the opponent's half, especially in or outside the penalty area; if given the chance, he has been known to attempt a shot on goal, either from distance, or by finishing off a teammate's pass after making late runs from behind into the area, – as exhibited by his goals against Cagliari in January 2014, Luxembourg in a June 2014 friendly, and England at the 2014 FIFA World Cup. Following Pirlo's departure, he has also developed into an effective corner and indirect free kick taker.

Due to his composed yet hard-working and tenacious style of play, Marchisio has garnered comparisons to Juventus legend and 1982 World Cup winner Marco Tardelli by the Italian press, who was arguably one of Italy's greatest "two-way" midfielders. Marchisio has also cited Steven Gerrard as one of his major influences. In addition to his qualities as a footballer, Marchisio was known for his composure and leadership; indeed, since breaking into the first team, he developed a reputation as a big game player for the club, due to his penchant for scoring or setting up "clutch" goals during important games. During his first Serie A season with Juventus, all three of his goals were decisive – being either match-winners or the opening goal of the match. He has also scored crucial goals against Juventus's derby rivals, Internazionale and Torino.

== Outside of professional football ==
Marchisio published an autobiography titled Nero su bianco (Black on white) on 2016; a follow-up book, titled Il mio terzo tempo (My third half), was published on 2020. In 2021, Marchisio began writing as a columnist for the Turin edition of the Corriere della Sera. Through his social media, he also became a strong voice on a number of social issues, including immigration and environment.

In 2021, his name was hinted as a possible Democratic Party candidate for Mayor of Turin, a rumour he soon thereafter refuted.

=== Business endeavours ===
In 2016, Marchisio and his wife started a Japanese-Italian fusion restaurant called "Legami" in their native Turin. It grew into a chain with several locations in the Turin metropolitan area and also in Rome, Sardinia and Bergamo.

Marchisio is the co-founder of a management agency, later merged with two other similar agencies, which specializes in managing image rights and official communication platforms for professional athletes and providing them with legal advice on contracts. The idea was born out of his own experience and the realisation about professional athletes' lack of knowledge or guidance on their legal rights, leaving them vulnerable to unscrupulous agents or business representatives. His long-time teammate Giorgio Chiellini joined as an investing partner in 2020.

== Personal life ==
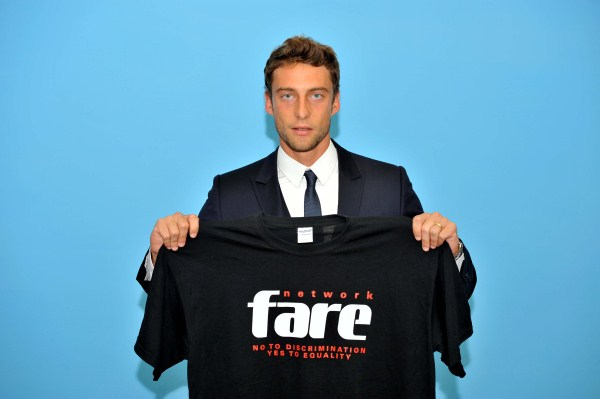
Marchisio holds up the FARE T-shirt and show his support for the FARE Action Weeks 2011.

Marchisio married Roberta Sinopoli from Calabria in June 2008 and they have two sons, Davide (born in August 2009) and Leonardo (born in March 2012). His wife, a former nationally ranked junior tennis player, supported Juve's crosstown rivals Torino as her father used to play for the Torino youth teams as well as various clubs in the Serie C2 and Serie D. Marchisio has his wife's birthday tattooed on the inside of his arm and occasionally kissed it when celebrating a goal. His former Empoli teammate Nicola Ascoli is married to his sister-in-law.

Marchisio is affectionately known as Il Principino ("The Little Prince"), a nickname he acquired from Juventus teammates early in his career due to the way he dressed and for his composed behaviour on the pitch; the nickname was later popularised by the Juventus-supporting Premium Calcio football commentator Claudio Zuliani. Some fans and observers have also dubbed him the "De Rossi of Turin," in reference to his national teammate Daniele De Rossi of Roma, due to their similar playing style, as well as the fact that both are local born and bred youth products, and had been tipped to be future captains of their respective clubs.

Marchisio was featured on the Italian cover of EA Sports' FIFA 13, alongside global cover star Lionel Messi.

Throughout the 2017–18 season, Marchisio appeared in the Netflix docu-series called First Team: Juventus.

On 29 October 2019, Marchisio and his wife were robbed by several gunmen at their home in Turin; they were uninjured.

On 3 May 2021, it was revealed that Marchisio's family had tested positive for COVID-19 in April amid its pandemic in Italy by his wife on Instagram.

== Career statistics ==
=== Club ===
| Club | Season | League | | | Cup | | Europe | | Other | | Total | |
| Club | Season | Division | Apps | Goals | Apps | Goals | Apps | Goals | Apps | Goals | Apps | Goals |
|---|---|---|---|---|---|---|---|---|---|---|---|---|
| Juventus | 2005–06 | Serie A | 0 | 0 | 0 | 0 | 0 | 0 | — | | 0 | 0 |
| Juventus | 2006–07 | Serie B | 25 | 0 | 1 | 0 | — | | — | | 26 | 0 |
| Juventus | 2008–09 | Serie A | 24 | 3 | 2 | 0 | 6 (Note: All appearances in UEFA Champions League) | 0 | — | | 32 | 3 |
| Juventus | 2009–10 | Serie A | 28 | 3 | 0 | 0 | 7 (Note: Four appearances in UEFA Champions League, Three appearances in Europa League) | 0 | — | | 35 | 3 |
| Juventus | 2010–11 | Serie A | 32 | 4 | 1 | 0 | 8 (Note: All appearances in Europa League) | 0 | — | | 41 | 4 |
| Juventus | 2011–12 | Serie A | 36 | 9 | 3 | 1 | — | | — | | 39 | 10 |
| Juventus | 2012–13 | Serie A | 29 | 6 | 2 | 0 | 8 | 2 | 1 (Note: Appearance in Supercoppa Italiana) | 0 | 40 | 8 |
| Juventus | 2013–14 | Serie A | 29 | 4 | 2 | 0 | 11 (Note: Four appearances UEFA Champions League, Seven appearances in Europa League) | 0 | 1 | 0 | 43 | 4 |
| Juventus | 2014–15 | Serie A | 35 | 3 | 4 | 0 | 12 | 0 | 1 | 0 | 52 | 3 |
| Juventus | 2015–16 | Serie A | 23 | 0 | 3 | 0 | 5 | 0 | 1 | 0 | 32 | 0 |
| Juventus | 2016–17 | Serie A | 18 | 1 | 2 | 0 | 8 | 1 | 1 | 0 | 29 | 2 |
| Juventus | 2017–18 | Serie A | 15 | 0 | 4 | 0 | 1 | 0 | 0 | 0 | 20 | 0 |
| Total | | | 294 | 33 | 24 | 1 | 66 | 3 | 5 | 0 | 389 | 37 |
| Empoli (loan) | 2007–08 | Serie A | 26 | 0 | 1 | 0 | 2 | 0 | — | | 29 | 0 |
| Zenit Saint Petersburg | 2018–19 | Premier League | 9 | 2 | 1 | 0 | 5 | 0 | — | | 15 | 2 |
| Career Total | | | 329 | 35 | 26 | 1 | 73 | 3 | 5 | 0 | 433 | 39 |

=== International ===
Italy national team
| Year | Apps | Goals |
|---|---|---|
| 2009 | 2 | 0 |
| 2010 | 7 | 0 |
| 2011 | 9 | 1 |
| 2012 | 13 | 0 |
| 2013 | 10 | 1 |
| 2014 | 10 | 2 |
| 2015 | 3 | 1 |
| 2016 | 0 | 0 |
| 2017 | 1 | 0 |
| Total | 55 | 5 |

==== International goals ====
Scores and results list Italy's goal tally first.

| # | Date | Venue | Opponent | Score | Result | Competition |
|---|---|---|---|---|---|---|
| 1. | 7 October 2011 | Stadion Crvena Zvezda, Belgrade | Serbia | 1–0 | 1–1 | UEFA Euro 2012 qualifying |
| 2. | 11 June 2013 | Estádio São Januário, Rio de Janeiro | Haiti | 2–0 | 2–2 | Friendly |
| 3. | 4 June 2014 | Stadio Renato Curi, Perugia | Luxembourg | 1–0 | 1–1 | Friendly |
| 4. | 14 June 2014 | Arena da Amazônia, Manaus | England | 1–0 | 2–1 | 2014 FIFA World Cup |
| 5. | 17 November 2015 | Stadio Renato Dall'Ara, Bologna | Romania | 1–1 | 2–2 | Friendly |

== Honours ==
Juventus

- Serie A: 2011–12, 2012–13, 2013–14, 2014–15, 2015–16, 2016–17, 2017–18
- Serie B: 2006–07
- Supercoppa Italiana: 2012, 2013, 2015
- Coppa Italia: 2014–15, 2015–16, 2016–17, 2017–18
- UEFA Champions League runner-up: 2014–15, 2016–17

Zenit Saint Petersburg

- Russian Premier League: 2018–19

Italy

- UEFA European Championship runner-up: 2012
- FIFA Confederations Cup third place: 2013

Italy U-21

- Toulon Tournament: 2008

Individual

- UEFA European Under-21 Championship Team of the Tournament: 2009
- Serie A Team of the Year: 2010–11 (joint winner with Thiago Motta), 2011–12
- UEFA Champions League Team of the Season: 2014–15
- Juventus FC Hall of Fame: 2025
