= 2018 MLS All-Star Game =

Soccer game played in Atlanta, Georgia

2018 MLS All-Star Game Presented by Target
Target All-Star Atlanta '18
- Event: 2018 Major League Soccer season
MLS All-Stars	Juventus
(United States) (Canada)	(Italy)
1	1
- Juventus won 5–3 on penalties
- Date: August 1, 2018
- Venue: Mercedes-Benz Stadium, Atlanta, Georgia
- Most Valuable Player: Josef Martínez (MLS All-Stars)
- Referee: Robert Sibiga (United States)
- Attendance: 72,317

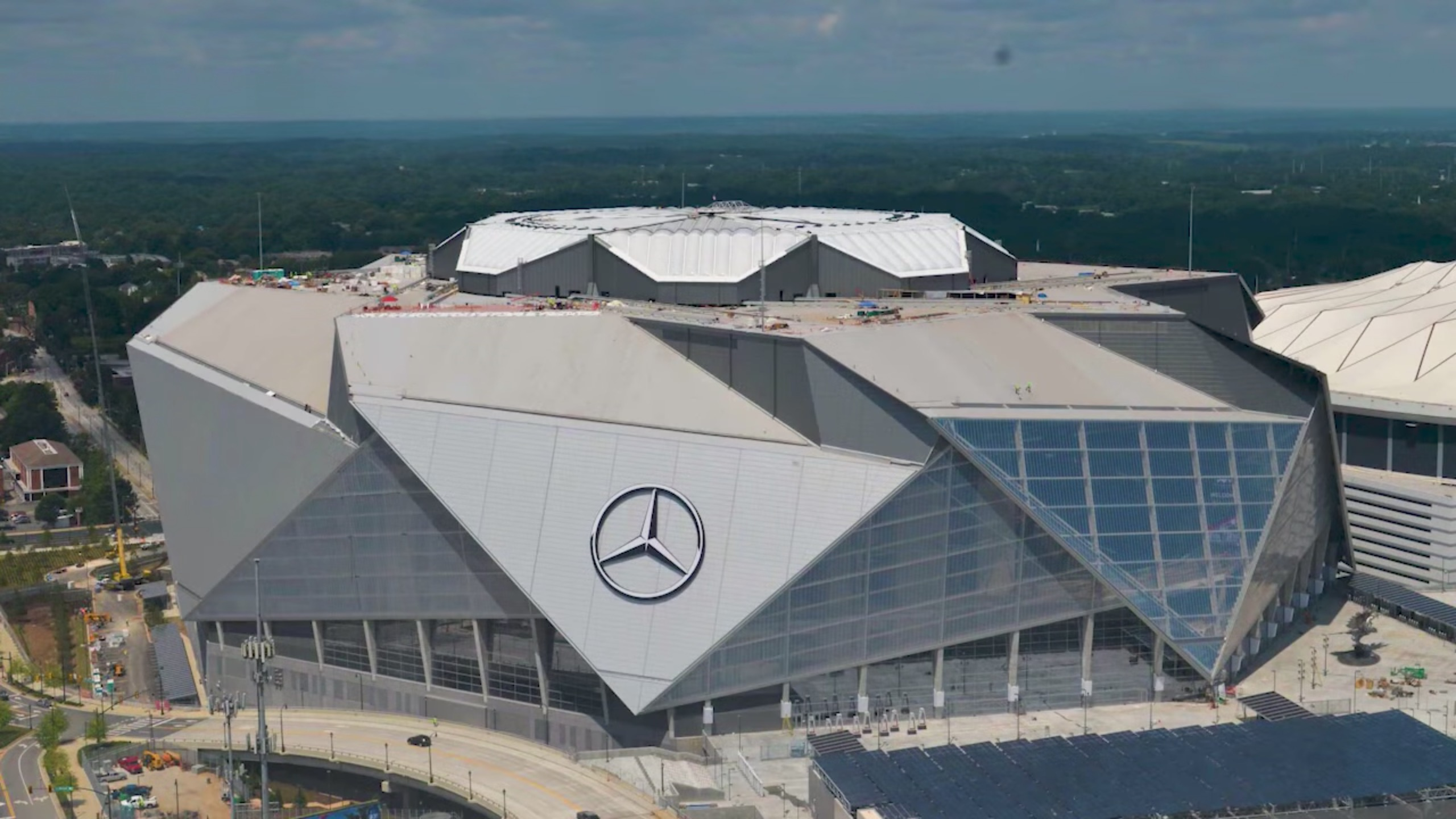
The match was held at Mercedes-Benz Stadium in Atlanta, Georgia.

The 2018 Major League Soccer All-Star Game was the 23rd edition of the annual Major League Soccer All-Star Game. It was held on August 1 at the Mercedes-Benz Stadium in Atlanta, Georgia and played against Italian club Juventus. The match was tied 1–1 after 90 minutes and was settled in a penalty shoot-out that Juventus won 5–3.

Josef Martínez won MVP.

The match was attended by 72,317, setting a new record for a standalone MLS All-Star Game.

== Pre-match ==
In October 2017, MLS announced that Atlanta would host the All-Star Game, due to the success of the first-year Atlanta United FC. Juventus was confirmed as the match's opponents in March 2018, participating as part of their American pre-season tour.

== Match rules ==
- Unlimited substitutions
- Penalty shoot-out if tied through full time; no extra time

== Squads ==
=== MLS All-Stars ===
Note: Flags indicate national team as defined under FIFA eligibility rules; some limited exceptions apply. Players may hold more than one non-FIFA nationality.

No.	Pos.	Nation	Player
1	GK	USA	Brad Guzan (Atlanta United)
2	MF	USA	Tyler Adams (New York Red Bulls)
3	DF	USA	Michael Parkhurst (Atlanta United)
4	MF	MEX	Jonathan dos Santos (LA Galaxy)
5	DF	CRC	Francisco Calvo (Minnesota United)
6	MF	ESP	Ilie (Sporting Kansas City)
8	MF	ARG	Diego Valeri (Portland Timbers)
10	MF	PAR	Miguel Almirón (Atlanta United)
11	FW	MEX	Carlos Vela (Los Angeles FC) (captain)
12	FW	ITA	Sebastian Giovinco (Toronto FC)
13	MF	FIN	Alexander Ring (New York City FC)
14	MF	HON	Alberth Elis (Houston Dynamo)
15	FW	VEN	Josef Martínez (Atlanta United)
16	GK	USA	Zack Steffen (Columbus Crew)

No.	Pos.	Nation	Player
17	MF	PER	Yoshimar Yotún (Orlando City)
18	MF	ARG	Ignacio Piatti (Montreal Impact)
19	DF	BEL	Laurent Ciman (Los Angeles FC)
20	DF	USA	Matt Hedges (FC Dallas)
21	FW	COL	Darwin Quintero (Minnesota United)
22	MF	ARG	Esequiel Barco (Atlanta United)
23	DF	USA	Graham Zusi (Sporting Kansas City)
24	DF	USA	Aaron Long (New York Red Bulls)
25	DF	PAN	Michael Amir Murillo (New York Red Bulls)
26	MF	CAN	Alphonso Davies (Vancouver Whitecaps FC)
27	MF	FRA	Wilfried Zahibo (New England Revolution)
28	FW	ENG	Bradley Wright-Phillips (New York Red Bulls)
29	FW	SWE	Zlatan Ibrahimović^{a} (LA Galaxy)
30	FW	ESP	David Villa^{a} (New York City FC)

- Manager: (Argentina) Gerardo Martino (Atlanta United)

=== Juventus ===
Note: Flags indicate national team as defined under FIFA eligibility rules; some limited exceptions apply. Players may hold more than one non-FIFA nationality.

No.	Pos.	Nation	Player
1	GK	POL	Wojciech Szczęsny
2	DF	ITA	Mattia De Sciglio
3	DF	ITA	Giorgio Chiellini (captain)
4	DF	MAR	Medhi Benatia
5	MF	BIH	Miralem Pjanić
6	MF	GER	Sami Khedira
8	MF	ITA	Claudio Marchisio
12	DF	BRA	Alex Sandro
15	DF	ITA	Andrea Barzagli
16	GK	ITA	Carlo Pinsoglio
19	GK	ITA	Mattia Perin
20	DF	POR	João Cancelo
23	MF	GER	Emre Can

No.	Pos.	Nation	Player
24	DF	ITA	Daniele Rugani
31	DF	ITA	Pietro Beruatto
32	GK	ITA	Mattia Del Favero
33	FW	ITA	Federico Bernardeschi
34	MF	NED	Leandro Fernandes
35	MF	CZE	Roman Macek
36	MF	CYP	Grigoris Kastanos
38	MF	ITA	Luca Clemenza
40	MF	BRA	Matheus Pereira
41	FW	ITA	Stefano Beltrame
42	FW	ITA	Andrea Favilli
43	MF	ITA	Alessandro Di Pardo
44	MF	ITA	Nicolò Fagioli

- Manager: (Italy) Massimiliano Allegri

Notes:

^{a} Injured or otherwise unable to play.

== Match ==
2018 MLS All-Star Game
August 1, 2018
7:30 p.m. EDT

MLS All-Stars (United States) (Canada)	1–1	(Italy) Juventus
Martínez 26'	Report	Favilli 21'
Penalties
Zusi (penalty scored); Yotún (penalty scored); Valeri (penalty scored); Wright-Phillips (penalty missed)	3–5	(penalty scored) Fagioli; (penalty scored) Beltrame; (penalty scored) Kastanos; (penalty scored) Fernandes; (penalty scored) De Sciglio

Mercedes-Benz Stadium, Atlanta, Georgia
Attendance: 72,317
Referee: Robert Sibiga (United States)

MLS All-Stars	Juventus

GK	1	(United States) Brad Guzan	(substituted off) 46'
DF	62	(Panama) Michael Amir Murillo	(substituted off) 46'
DF	33	(United States) Aaron Long	(substituted off) 62'
DF	23	(Belgium) Laurent Ciman	(substituted off) 46'
DF	5	(Costa Rica) Francisco Calvo	(substituted off) 32'
MF	2	(United States) Tyler Adams	(substituted off) 32'
MF	14	(Finland) Alexander Ring	(substituted off) 46'
MF	11	(Mexico) Carlos Vela (c)	(substituted off) 46'
MF	10	(Paraguay) Miguel Almirón	(substituted off) 46'
MF	21	(Argentina) Ignacio Piatti	(substituted off) 32'
FW	17	(Venezuela) Josef Martínez	(substituted off) 32'
Substitutes:
GK	18	(United States) Zack Steffen	(substituted on) 46'
DF	3	(United States) Michael Parkhurst	(substituted on) 62'
DF	28	(United States) Graham Zusi	(substituted on) 46'
DF	24	(United States) Matt Hedges	(substituted on) 46'
DF	67	(Canada) Alphonso Davies	(substituted on) 32' (substituted off) 63'
MF	8	(Argentina) Diego Valeri	(substituted on) 46'
MF	25	(Colombia) Darwin Quintero	(substituted on) 62'
MF	4	(Mexico) Jonathan dos Santos	(substituted on) 32' (substituted off) 62'
MF	6	(Spain) Ilie	(substituted on) 46'
MF	19	(Peru) Yoshimar Yotún	(substituted on) 63'
MF	77	(France) Wilfried Zahibo	(substituted on) 62'
MF	16	(Honduras) Alberth Elis	(substituted on) 46'
MF	27	(Argentina) Ezequiel Barco	(substituted on) 32' (substituted off) 62'
FW	99	(England) Bradley Wright-Phillips	(substituted on) 62'
FW	12	(Italy) Sebastian Giovinco	(substituted on) 32' (substituted off) 62'
Manager:
(Argentina) Gerardo Martino

GK	1	(Poland) Wojciech Szczęsny		(substituted off) 46'
DF	20	(Portugal) João Cancelo		(substituted off) 74'
DF	24	(Italy) Daniele Rugani
DF	15	(Italy) Andrea Barzagli (c)		(substituted off) 46'
DF	12	(Brazil) Alex Sandro	(yellow card) 44'	(substituted off) 46'
MF	6	(Germany) Sami Khedira		(substituted off) 46'
MF	5	(Bosnia and Herzegovina) Miralem Pjanić		(substituted off) 46'
MF	23	(Germany) Emre Can		(substituted off) 46'
FW	33	(Italy) Federico Bernardeschi		(substituted off) 46'
FW	42	(Italy) Andrea Favilli		(substituted off) 46'
FW	40	(Brazil) Matheus Pereira		(substituted off) 65'
Substitutes:
GK	16	(Italy) Carlo Pinsoglio
GK	19	(Italy) Mattia Perin		(substituted on) 46'
GK	32	(Italy) Mattia Del Favero
DF	3	(Italy) Giorgio Chiellini
DF	4	(Morocco) Medhi Benatia		(substituted on) 46'
DF	2	(Italy) Mattia De Sciglio		(substituted on) 46'
DF	43	(Italy) Alessandro Di Pardo		(substituted on) 74'
MF	8	(Italy) Claudio Marchisio
MF	35	(Czech Republic) Roman Macek
MF	36	(Cyprus) Grigoris Kastanos		(substituted on) 46'
MF	34	(Netherlands) Leandro Fernandes	(yellow card) 88'	(substituted on) 46'
MF	44	(Italy) Nicolò Fagioli		(substituted on) 46'
FW	41	(Italy) Stefano Beltrame		(substituted on) 46'
FW	38	(Italy) Luca Clemenza		(substituted on) 46'
FW	31	(Italy) Pietro Beruatto		(substituted on) 65'
Manager:
(Italy) Massimiliano Allegri

Most valuable player:
(Venezuela) Josef Martínez (MLS All-Stars)

Assistant referees:
Jason White
Eric Weisbrod
Fourth official:
Nima Saghafi
Video assistant referee:
Alex Chilowicz

Match rules

- 90 minutes.
- Unlimited substitutions.
- No extra time.
- Penalty shoot-out if scores still level.

== Controversy ==
Zlatan Ibrahimović, then a player of the Los Angeles Galaxy, was selected for the All-Star Game, but he chose to withdraw from the game, citing fatigue caused by travelling and the congested schedule. In consequence, the MLS suspended Ibrahimović for the regular season game after the All-Star Game, which saw the Colorado Rapids defeat the Galaxy by 2-1. In a later interview, Ibrahimović called the suspension "ridiculous". "They do whatever they want. I come from a different world, I come from the real world." said Ibrahimović.
