= 2017–18 Juventus FC season =

Italian football club season

Juventus
2017–18 season
- Chairman: Andrea Agnelli
- Head coach: Massimiliano Allegri
- Stadium: Allianz Stadium
- Serie A: 1st
- Coppa Italia: Winners
- Supercoppa Italiana: Runners-up
- UEFA Champions League: Quarter-finals
- Top goalscorer: League: Paulo Dybala (22); All: Paulo Dybala (26)
- Highest home attendance: 41,232 vs Tottenham Hotspur (13 February 2018, Champions League)
- Lowest home attendance: 29,412 vs Genoa (22 January 2018, Serie A)
- Average home league attendance: 39,316
Home colours	Away colours	Third colours

The 2017–18 season was Juventus Football Club's 120th in existence and 11th consecutive season in the top flight of Italian football. Due to sponsorship reasons, from 1 July 2017 until 30 June 2023, the Juventus Stadium was known as the Allianz Stadium of Turin. During the previous season, president Agnelli announced that a new Juventus logo would be introduced, revealing a video showing the introduction of the new logo. The logo shows the word Juventus on top, with two capital Js shown together in different fonts with a small opening between them to almost make a bigger J. Agnelli said that the logo reflects "the Juventus way of living". In this season, Juventus introduced their new logo on the kits. On 16 February 2018, the first three episodes of a docu-series called First Team: Juventus, which followed the club throughout the season, by spending time with the players behind the scenes both on and off the field, was released on Netflix; the other three episodes were released on 6 July 2018.

On 9 May 2018, Juventus won their 13th Coppa Italia title, and fourth in a row, in a 4–0 win over Milan, extending the all-time record of successive Coppa Italia titles. Four days later on 13 May, following a 0–0 draw with Roma, Juventus secured their seventh consecutive Serie A title, extending the all-time record of successive triumphs in the competition. Then on 17 May, iconic Juventus goalkeeper Gianluigi Buffon announced his farewell to Serie A (and the national football team). He left Serie A after 23 career seasons, the last 17 being with Juventus, nine league titles, and 640 caps, the second highest in Serie A. Buffon would return to Juventus in 2019 after a one-year spell with PSG.

== Players ==
=== Squad information ===
Players and squad numbers last updated on 4 January 2018.
Note: Flags indicate national team as has been defined under FIFA eligibility rules. Players may hold more than one non-FIFA nationality.

No.	Name	Nat	Position(s)	Date of birth (age)	Signed in	Contract ends	Signed from	Transfer Fee	Notes
Goalkeepers
1	Gianluigi Buffon	(Italy)	GK	28 January 1978 (aged 40)	2001	2018	(Italy) Parma	€45M	Captain
16	Carlo Pinsoglio	(Italy)	GK	16 March 1990 (aged 28)	2014	2018	(Italy) Youth Sector	N/A	
23	Wojciech Szczęsny	(Poland)	GK	18 April 1990 (aged 28)	2017	2021	(England) Arsenal	€12M	
Defenders
2	Mattia De Sciglio	(Italy)	RB / RWB	20 October 1992 (aged 25)	2017	2022	(Italy) AC Milan	€12M	
3	Giorgio Chiellini	(Italy)	CB / LB	14 August 1984 (aged 33)	2005	2018	(Italy) Fiorentina	€7.4M	Vice-captain
4	Medhi Benatia	(Morocco)	CB	17 April 1987 (aged 31)	2016	2020	(Germany) Bayern Munich	€20M	
12	Alex Sandro	(Brazil)	LB / LWB	26 January 1991 (aged 27)	2015	2020	(Portugal) Porto	€26M	
15	Andrea Barzagli	(Italy)	CB	8 May 1981 (aged 37)	2011	2018	(Germany) Wolfsburg	€0.3M	
21	Benedikt Höwedes	(Germany)	CB / RB / LB	29 February 1988 (aged 30)	2017	2018	(Germany) Schalke 04	€3.5M	On loan until 2018
24	Daniele Rugani	(Italy)	CB	29 July 1994 (aged 23)	2015	2021	(Italy) Empoli	€3.5M	
26	Stephan Lichtsteiner	(Switzerland)	RB / RWB	16 January 1984 (aged 34)	2011	2018	(Italy) Lazio	€10M	
Midfielders
5	Miralem Pjanić	(Bosnia and Herzegovina)	DM / CM / AM	2 April 1990 (aged 28)	2016	2021	(Italy) Roma	€32M	
6	Sami Khedira	(Germany)	DM / CM	4 April 1987 (aged 31)	2015	2019	(Spain) Real Madrid	Free	
8	Claudio Marchisio	(Italy)	DM / CM	19 January 1986 (aged 32)	2006	2020	(Italy) Youth Sector	N/A	Second vice-captain
14	Blaise Matuidi	(France)	CM/ DM / LM	9 April 1987 (aged 31)	2017	2020	(France) Paris Saint-Germain	€20M	
22	Kwadwo Asamoah	(Ghana)	LB / LWB / CM	9 December 1988 (aged 29)	2012	2018	(Italy) Udinese	€18M	
27	Stefano Sturaro	(Italy)	DM / CM	9 March 1993 (aged 25)	2014	2021	(Italy) Genoa	€5.5M	
30	Rodrigo Bentancur	(Uruguay)	DM / CM	25 June 1997 (aged 21)	2017	2022	(Argentina) Boca Juniors	€9.5M	
Forwards
7	Juan Cuadrado	(Colombia)	RW / RWB	26 May 1988 (aged 30)	2016	2020	(England) Chelsea	€25M	
9	Gonzalo Higuaín	(Argentina)	ST / CF	10 December 1987 (aged 30)	2016	2021	(Italy) Napoli	€90M	
10	Paulo Dybala	(Argentina)	ST / AM	15 November 1993 (aged 24)	2015	2022	(Italy) Palermo	€32M	
11	Douglas Costa	(Brazil)	RW / LW	14 September 1990 (aged 27)	2017	2018	(Germany) Bayern Munich	€6M	On loan until 2018
17	Mario Mandžukić	(Croatia)	ST / LW	21 May 1986 (aged 32)	2015	2020	(Spain) Atlético Madrid	€19M	
33	Federico Bernardeschi	(Italy)	RW / LW / SS	16 February 1994 (aged 24)	2017	2022	(Italy) Fiorentina	€40M	

== Transfers ==
=== Summer 2017 ===
==== In ====
Date	Pos.	Player	Age	Moving from	Fee	Notes	Source
21 April 2017	MF	(Uruguay) Rodrigo Bentancur	19	(Argentina) Boca Juniors	€9.5M		
1 July 2017	GK	(Italy) Carlo Pinsoglio	27	(Italy) Latina		End of loan	
12 July 2017	FW	(Brazil) Douglas Costa	26	(Germany) Bayern Munich	€6M+€1M variables	On loan until 2018 with an option to buy for €40M	
19 July 2017	GK	(Poland) Wojciech Szczęsny	27	(England) Arsenal	€12.2M+€3.1M variables		
20 July 2017	DF	(Italy) Mattia De Sciglio	24	(Italy) AC Milan	€12M+€0.5M variables		
24 July 2017	FW	(Italy) Federico Bernardeschi	23	(Italy) Fiorentina	€40M		
18 August 2017	MF	(France) Blaise Matuidi	30	(France) Paris Saint-Germain	€20M+€10.5M variables		
30 August 2017	DF	(Germany) Benedikt Höwedes	29	(Germany) Schalke 04	€3.5M+€3M variables	On loan until 2018 with an option to buy for €13M	

==== Out ====
Date	Pos.	Player	Age	Moving to	Fee	Notes	Source
29 June 2017	DF	(Brazil) Dani Alves	34	(France) Paris Saint-Germain	Free	Contract termination	
1 July 2017	DF	(Italy) Paolo De Ceglie	30	Unattached	Free	Contract expiration	
3 July 2017	MF	(Italy) Federico Mattiello	21	(Italy) SPAL		On loan until 2018	
7 July 2017	GK	(Brazil) Neto	27	(Spain) Valencia	€6M+€1M in variables		
8 July 2017	GK	(Italy) Emil Audero	20	(Italy) Venezia		On loan until 2018	
14 July 2017	DF	(Italy) Leonardo Bonucci	30	(Italy) AC Milan	€42M	Paid over three years	
5 August 2017	MF	(Italy) Rolando Mandragora	20	(Italy) Crotone		On loan until 2018	
8 August 2017	MF	(Gabon) Mario Lemina	23	(England) Southampton	€17M+€3M variables		
11 August 2017	MF	(Venezuela) Tomás Rincón	29	(Italy) Torino	€3M	On loan until 2018 with an option to buy for €6M	
31 August 2017	FW	(Italy) Moise Kean	17	(Italy) Verona		On loan until 2018	

==== Other acquisitions ====
Date	Pos.	Player	Age	Moving from	Fee	Notes	Source
12 May 2017	DF	(Morocco) Medhi Benatia	30	(Germany) Bayern Munich	€17M	Opted for option to sign permanently	
22 May 2017	FW	(Colombia) Juan Cuadrado	28	(England) Chelsea	€20M+€4M variables	Signed permanently from loan	
1 July 2017	FW	(Senegal) Mame Baba Thiam	24	(Italy) Empoli		End of loan	
28 July 2017	DF	(Italy) Dario Del Fabro	22	(Italy) Cagliari	€4.5M		
28 August 2017	MF	(Brazil) Matheus Pereira	19	(Italy) Empoli	€2M	Opted for option to sign permanently	
31 August 2017	MF	(Italy) Ferdinando Del Sole	19	(Italy) Pescara	€3.7M	On loan until 30 June 2018	

==== Other disposals ====
Date	Pos.	Player	Age	Moving to	Fee	Notes	Source
15 March 2017	MF	(Spain) Nico Hidalgo	24	(Spain) Cádiz	Free	Contract expiration	
10 April 2017	FW	(Italy) Simone Zaza	25	(Spain) Valencia	€16M+€2M variables	Valencia bought loan outright	
27 April 2017	FW	(France) Kingsley Coman	20	(Germany) Bayern Munich	€21M	Bayern Munich bought loan outright	
22 June 2017	FW	(Guinea) Alhassane Soumah	21	(Switzerland) Chiasso		On loan until 2018	
28 June 2017	FW	(Italy) Stefano Beltrame	24	(Netherlands) Go Ahead Eagles		On loan until 2018	
29 June 2017	FW	(Morocco) Younes Bnou Marzouk	21	(Switzerland) Lugano	€0.4M		
1 July 2017	FW	(Greece) Anastasios Donis	20	(Germany) Stuttgart	4M		
1 July 2017	DF	(Italy) Stefano Pellizzari	20	(Austria) Wattens		On loan until 2018	
1 July 2017	DF	(Brazil) Filipe	20	-	Free	Contract expiration	
1 July 2017	MF	(Albania) Elvis Kabashi	23	-	Free	Contract expiration	
5 July 2017	DF	(Italy) Michele Cavion	22	(Italy) Cremonese	Free	Contract expiration	
7 July 2017	DF	(Italy) Nazzareno Belfasti	23	(Italy) Pro Piacenza		On loan until 2018	
8 July 2017	MF	(Italy) Mattia Vitale	19	(Italy) Venezia		On loan until 2018	
11 July 2017	DF	(Spain) Carlos Blanco Moreno	21	(Spain) Nàstic	Free	Contract expiration	
12 July 2017	FW	(Italy) Simone Andrea Ganz	23	(Italy) Pescara	€1.5M		
13 July 2017	FW	(Italy) Nicolò Pozzebon	20	(Italy) Mestre		On loan until 2018	
14 July 2017	FW	(Italy) Riccardo Orsolini	20	(Italy) Atalanta		On loan until 2019 with option to buy	
17 July 2017	MF	(Italy) Stefano Pellini	19	(Italy) Cuneo	Free	Contract expiration	
18 July 2017	MF	(Colombia) Andrés Tello	20	(Italy) Bari		On loan until 2018 with option to buy	
19 July 2017	DF	(Italy) Luca Barlocco	22	(Italy) Pro Vercelli		On loan until 2018	
19 July 2017	DF	(Italy) Claudio Zappa	20	(Italy) Pistoiese		On loan until 2018	
20 July 2017	FW	(Italy) Cristian Pasquato	28	(Poland) Legia Warsaw	€1M		
21 July 2017	GK	(Italy) Alberto Gallinetta	25	(Italy) Ravenna		On loan until 2018	
21 July 2017	MF	(Italy) Francesco Cassata	19	(Italy) Sassuolo	€7M	Option for Buy-back clause	
24 July 2017	FW	(Italy) Alberto Cerri	21	(Italy) Perugia		On loan until 2018 with option to buy	
24 July 2017	MF	(Norway) Vajebah Sakor	21	(Sweden) IFK Göteborg		On loan until 1 December 2017 with option to buy	
26 July 2017	MF	(Cyprus) Grigoris Kastanos	19	(Belgium) Zulte Waregem	€0.05M	On loan until 2018 with option to buy	
26 July 2017	MF	(Lithuania) Vykintas Slivka	22	(Scotland) Hibernian	€0.1M		
27 July 2017	GK	(Italy) Nicola Leali	24	(Belgium) Zulte Waregem		On loan until 2018 with option to buy	
27 July 2017	FW	(Italy) Stefano Padovan	23	(Italy) Casertana		On loan until 2019 with option to buy	
28 July 2017	DF	(Italy) Filippo Romagna	20	(Italy) Cagliari	€7.6M	Option for Buy-back clause	
1 August 2017	MF	(Netherlands) Ouasim Bouy	24	(England) Leeds United	Free		
4 August 2017	DF	(Italy) Dario Del Fabro	22	(Italy) Novara		On loan until 2018	
7 August 2017	GK	(Italy) Alberto Brignoli	25	(Italy) Benevento		On loan until 2018 with option to buy	
8 August 2017	FW	(Italy) Cristian Bunino	20	(Italy) Alessandria		On loan until 2018 with option to buy	
9 August 2017	MF	(Czech Republic) Roman Macek	20	(Italy) Cremonese		On loan until 2018 with option to buy	
11 August 2017	MF	(Italy) Luca Clemenza	20	(Italy) Ascoli		On loan until 2018 with option to buy	
13 August 2017	MF	(France) Roger Tamba M'Pinda	19	(Austria) Wattens		On loan until 2018	
18 August 2017	GK	(Italy) Francesco Anacoura	23	(Portugal) CD Cova Piedade	Free	Contract expiration	
18 August 2017	FW	(Italy) Lorenzo Rosseti	23	(Italy) Ascoli	€1M		
23 August 2017	FW	(Italy) Eric Lanini	23	(Italy) Vicenza		On loan until 2018	
24 August 2017	DF	(Spain) Pol García	22	(Italy) Cremonese		On loan until 2018 with option to buy	
25 August 2017	DF	(Switzerland) Joel Untersee	23	(Italy) Empoli		On loan until 2018	
25 August 2017	MF	(Italy) Luca Marrone	27	(Italy) Bari		On loan until 2018	
29 August 2017	GK	(Italy) Timothy Nocchi	27	(Italy) Perugia		On loan until 2018	
30 August 2017	FW	(Italy) Davide Massaro	19	(Switzerland) Ascona	Free		
31 August 2017	MF	(Italy) Mattia Vitale	19	(Italy) SPAL		On loan until 2018	
31 August 2017	MF	(Brazil) Matheus Pereira	19	(France) Bordeaux		On loan until 2018 with option to buy	
31 August 2017	MF	(Italy) Giorgio Siani	20	(Netherlands) Den Bosch		On loan until 2018	
31 August 2017	FW	(Italy) King Udoh	19	(Italy) Fermana		On loan until 2018	

Total expenditure: €150,400,000

Total revenue: €127,650,000

Net income: ▼€22,750,000

=== Winter 2017–18 ===
==== In ====
Date	Pos.	Player	Age	Moving from	Fee	Notes	Source
31 January 2018	MF	(Netherlands) Leandro Fernandes	18	(Netherlands) PSV	Free		

==== Out ====
Date	Pos.	Player	Age	Moving to	Fee	Notes	Source
4 January 2018	FW	(Croatia) Marko Pjaca	22	(Germany) Schalke 04	€0.8M+€0.2M variables	Loan out until 30 June 2018	
31 January 2018	MF	(Italy) Fabrizio Caligara	17	(Italy) Cagliari	€2M	Option for Buy-back clause	

==== Other acquisitions ====
Date	Pos.	Player	Age	Moving from	Fee	Notes	Source
23 January 2018	MF	(Italy) Ferdinando Del Sole	20	(Italy) Pescara		End of loan	
25 January 2018	MF	(Italy) Alessandro Di Pardo	18	(Italy) SPAL	€0.5M	Opted for option to sign permanently	
30 January 2018	DF	(Italy) Pietro Beruatto	19	(Italy) Vicenza		End of loan	
31 January 2018	FW	(Italy) Leonardo Mancuso	25	(Italy) Pescara	€2M	On loan until June 2019	
31 January 2018	FW	(Austria) Arnel Jakupović	19	(Italy) Empoli		On loan until June 2018 with option to buy	
31 January 2018	MF	(Cyprus) Grigoris Kastanos	20	(Belgium) Zulte Waregem		End of loan	

==== Other disposals ====
Date	Pos.	Player	Age	Moving to	Fee	Notes	Source
10 November 2017	FW	(Senegal) Mame Baba Thiam	25	(Iran) Esteghlal	Free	Contract termination	
18 December 2017	MF	(Norway) Vajebah Sakor	21	(Sweden) IFK Göteborg	Undisclosed	Redeem after loan	
18 January 2018	DF	(Italy) Luca Barlocco	22	(Italy) Alessandria		On loan until June 2018	
25 January 2018	MF	(Italy) Mattia Vitale	20	(Italy) SPAL	€0.5M		
25 January 2018	FW	(Italy) King Udoh	20	(Italy) Fano		On loan until June 2018	
26 January 2018	GK	(Italy) Nicola Leali	24	(Italy) Perugia		On loan until 2018 with option to buy	
27 January 2018	MF	(Italy) Nicola Mosti	19	(Italy) Viterbese		On loan until June 2018	
30 January 2018	DF	(Italy) Luca Coccolo	19	(Italy) Prato		On loan until June 2018	
30 January 2018	FW	(Italy) Eric Lanini	23	(Italy) Padova		On loan until June 2018	
31 January 2018	FW	(Italy) Riccardo Orsolini	21	(Italy) Bologna		On loan until 2019 with option to buy	
31 January 2018	MF	(Italy) Federico Mattiello	22	(Italy) Atalanta	€2.5M+€2.5M variables	On loan to SPAL until June 2018; Option for Buy-back clause	
31 January 2018	DF	(Spain) Pol Lirola	22	(Italy) Sassuolo	€7M	Redeem after loan Option for Buy-back clause	
31 January 2018	DF	(Italy) Alessandro Tripaldelli	18	(Italy) Sassuolo	€1.5M	On loan to Juventus until June 2018; Option for Buy-back clause	
31 January 2018	FW	(Italy) Cristian Bunino	21	(Italy) Pescara	€1.5M		
31 January 2018	FW	(Italy) Fabio Morselli	19	(Italy) Pescara	€0.5M	Redeem after loan	
31 January 2018	FW	(Italy) Francesco Margiotta	24	(Switzerland) Lausanne	€1M + Variables	Redeem after loan	
1 February 2018	MF	(Brazil) Matheus Pereira	19	(Brazil) Paraná		On loan until June 2018 with an option to extend loan until December 2018	
5 February 2018	MF	(Venezuela) Tomás Rincón	30	(Italy) Torino	€6M	Option to buy exercised	

Total expenditure: €2,500,000

Total revenue: €23,500,000

Net income: ▲€21,000,000

== Pre-season and friendlies ==
22 July 2017 ICC	Juventus	1–2	Barcelona	East Rutherford, United States
18:00 EDT (UTC−04:00)	Marchisio (yellow card) 43'; Chiellini 63'	Report	Neymar 15', 26'; Aleix Vidal (yellow card) 35'	Stadium: MetLife Stadium; Attendance: 82,104; Referee: Edvin Jurisevic (United States)

26 July 2017 ICC	Paris Saint-Germain	2–3	Juventus	Miami, United States
20:30 EDT (UTC−04:00)	Verratti (yellow card) 29'; Guedes 53'; Dani Alves (yellow card) 60'; Pastore 80'	Report	Bentancur (yellow card) 23'; Higuaín 45'; Marchisio 62', 89' (pen.)	Stadium: Hard Rock Stadium; Attendance: 44,444; Referee: Ted Unkel (United States)

30 July 2017 ICC	Roma	1–1 (4–5 p)	Juventus	Foxborough, United States
16:00 EDT (UTC−04:00)	Perotti (yellow card) 40'; Džeko (yellow card) 62', (goal) 74'	Report	Mandžukić 29'; Chiellini (yellow card) 70'	Stadium: Gillette Stadium; Attendance: 33,039; Referee: Jorge Gonzalez (United States)
	Penalties
	Tumminello (penalty missed); Pellegrini (penalty scored); Iturbe (penalty scored); Peres (penalty scored); Ünder (penalty scored)		(penalty scored) Lichtsteiner; (penalty scored) Barzagli; (penalty scored) Bernardeschi; (penalty scored) Khedira; (penalty scored) Douglas Costa

5 August 2017 Friendly	Tottenham Hotspur	2–0	Juventus	London, England
17:30 BST	Kane 10'; Eriksen 52'	Report		Stadium: Wembley Stadium; Attendance: 26,251; Referee: Martin Atkinson (England)

== Competitions ==
=== Supercoppa Italiana ===
13 August 2017	Juventus	2–3	Lazio	Rome
20:45 CEST	Buffon (yellow card) 31'; Mandžukić (yellow card) 52'; Pjanić (yellow card) 73'; Dybala 85', 90+1' (pen.)	Report	Immobile 32' (pen.), 54', (yellow card) 89'; Lucas (yellow card) 41'; Lulić (yellow card) 70'; Parolo (yellow card) 84'; Murgia 90+3'	Stadium: Stadio Olimpico; Attendance: 52,000; Referee: Davide Massa

=== Serie A ===
==== League table ====
Pos	Team	Pld	W	D	L	GF	GA	GD	Pts	Qualification or relegation
1	Juventus (C)	38	30	5	3	86	24	+62	95	Qualification to Champions League group stage
2	Napoli	38	28	7	3	77	29	+48	91	Qualification to Champions League group stage
3	Roma	38	23	8	7	61	28	+33	77	Qualification to Champions League group stage
4	Internazionale	38	20	12	6	66	30	+36	72	Qualification to Champions League group stage
5	Lazio	38	21	9	8	89	49	+40	72 (Note: Internazionale finished ahead of Lazio on head-to-head: Internazionale 0–0 Lazio, Lazio 2–3 Internazionale)	Qualification to Europa League group stage (Note: Since the winners of the 2017–18 Coppa Italia, Juventus, qualified for European competition based on league position, the spot awarded to the cup winners (Europa League group stage) was passed to the sixth-placed team and the spot awarded to the sixth-placed team (Europa League second qualifying round) was passed to the seventh-placed team.)

Source: Serie A, Soccerway
Rules for classification: 1) Points; 2) Head-to-head points; 3) Head-to-head goal difference; 4) Goal difference; 5) Goals scored; 6) Draw.
(C) Champions

==== Results summary ====
Overall								Home						Away					
Pld	W	D	L	GF	GA	GD	Pts	W	D	L	GF	GA	GD	W	D	L	GF	GA	GD
38	30	5	3	86	24	+62	95	16	1	2	45	8	+37	14	4	1	41	16	+25

Last updated: 19 May 2018.
Source: Competitive matches

==== Results by round ====
Round	1	2	3	4	5	6	7	8	9	10	11	12	13	14	15	16	17	18	19	20	21	22	23	24	25	26	27	28	29	30	31	32	33	34	35	36	37	38
Ground	H	A	H	A	H	H	A	H	A	H	A	H	A	H	A	H	A	H	A	A	H	A	H	A	A	H	A	H	A	H	A	H	A	H	A	H	A	H
Result	W	W	W	W	W	W	D	L	W	W	W	W	L	W	W	D	W	W	W	W	W	W	W	W	W	W	W	W	D	W	W	W	D	L	W	W	D	W
Position	2	1	1	2	2	2	2	3	3	3	3	2	3	3	3	3	2	2	2	2	2	2	2	2	2	2	2	1	1	1	1	1	1	1	1	1	1	1

Updated to match(es) played on 19 May 2018. Source: Competitive matches
A = Away; H = Home; W = Win; D = Draw; L = Loss

==== Matches ====
19 August 2017 1	Juventus	3–0	Cagliari	Turin
18:00 CEST (UTC+02:00)	Mandžukić 12'; Dybala 45+1'; Higuaín 66'; Lichtsteiner (yellow card) 77'	Report	Farias (penalty missed) 39'	Stadium: Allianz Stadium; Attendance: 39,226; Referee: Fabio Maresca

26 August 2017 2	Genoa	2–4	Juventus	Genoa
18:00 CEST (UTC+02:00)	Pjanić 1' (o.g.); Galabinov 7' (pen.); Gentiletti (yellow card) 13'; Biraschi (yellow card) 17'; Lazović (yellow card) 45+3'; Laxalt (yellow card) 78'	Report	Lichtsteiner (yellow card) 8'; Dybala 14', 45+4' (pen.), 90+2'; Pjanić (yellow card) 18'; Cuadrado 62', (yellow card) 64'	Stadium: Stadio Luigi Ferraris; Attendance: 26,296; Referee: Luca Banti

9 September 2017 3	Juventus	3–0	Chievo	Turin
18:00 CEST (UTC+02:00)	Hetemaj 17' (o.g.); Mandžukić (yellow card) 52'; Higuaín 58'; Matuidi (yellow card) 79'; Dybala 83'	Report	Hetemaj (yellow card) 22'	Stadium: Allianz Stadium; Attendance: 39,742; Referee: Michael Fabbri

17 September 2017 4	Sassuolo	1–3	Juventus	Reggio Emilia
12:30 CEST (UTC+02:00)	Politano 51'; Adjapong (yellow card) 56'	Report	Dybala 16', 49', 63'; Alex Sandro (yellow card) 31'; Bernardeschi (yellow card) 86'	Stadium: Mapei Stadium – Città del Tricolore; Attendance: 21,584; Referee: Davide Massa

20 September 2017 5	Juventus	1–0	Fiorentina	Turin
20:45 CEST (UTC+02:00)	Barzagli (yellow card) 23'; Mandžukić 52'	Report	Laurini (yellow card) 37'; Badelj (yellow card) 50' (yellow-red card) 66'; Astori (yellow card) 64'	Stadium: Allianz Stadium; Attendance: 35,652; Referee: Daniele Doveri

23 September 2017 6	Juventus	4–0	Torino	Turin
20:45 CEST (UTC+02:00)	Dybala 16', 90+1'; Pjanić 40'; Benatia (yellow card) 45+1'; Alex Sandro 57'	Report	Baselli (yellow card) 10' (yellow-red card) 24'; Ljajić (yellow card) 39'; Acquah (yellow card) 83'	Stadium: Allianz Stadium; Attendance: 40,186; Referee: Piero Giacomelli

1 October 2017 7	Atalanta	2–2	Juventus	Bergamo
20:45 CEST (UTC+02:00)	Caldara 31'; Gómez (yellow card) 64'; Cristante 67'; Palomino (yellow card) 80'; Petagna (yellow card) 82'	Report	Bernardeschi 21'; Higuaín 24'; Lichtsteiner (yellow card) 58'; Dybala (penalty missed) 84'	Stadium: Stadio Atleti Azzurri d'Italia; Attendance: 19,962; Referee: Antonio Damato

14 October 2017 8	Juventus	1–2	Lazio	Turin
18:00 CEST (UTC+02:00)	Douglas Costa 23'; Buffon (yellow card) 52'; Sturaro (yellow card) 90+3'; Dybala (penalty missed) 90'+7'	Report	Immobile 47', 54' (pen.); Patric (yellow card) 90+7'	Stadium: Allianz Stadium; Attendance: 40,544; Referee: Paolo Mazzoleni

22 October 2017 9	Udinese	2–6	Juventus	Udine
18:00 CEST (UTC+02:00)	Perica 8', (yellow card) 51'; Ali Adnan (yellow card) 26'; Samir (yellow card) 32'; Danilo 47', (yellow card) 55'; Hallfreðsson (yellow card) 58'; Fofana (yellow card) 83'	Report	Samir 14' (o.g.); Khedira 20', 59', 87'; Mandžukić (yellow card) 26' (yellow-red card) 26'; Rugani 52'; Cuadrado (yellow card) 61'; Pjanić 90'	Stadium: Dacia Arena; Attendance: 21,992; Referee: Daniele Doveri

25 October 2017 10	Juventus	4–1	SPAL	Turin
20:45 CEST (UTC+02:00)	Bernardeschi 14'; Dybala 22'; Rugani (yellow card) 37'; Higuaín 65'; Cuadrado 70'	Report	Paloschi 34'	Stadium: Allianz Stadium; Attendance: 39,953; Referee: Fabrizio Pasqua

28 October 2017 11	AC Milan	0–2	Juventus	Milan
18:00 CET (UTC+01:00)	Kessié (yellow card) 32'; Zapata (yellow card) 90+1'	Report	Higuaín 23', 63'	Stadium: San Siro; Attendance: 78,328; Referee: Paolo Valeri

5 November 2017 12	Juventus	2–1	Benevento	Turin
15:00 CET (UTC+01:00)	Marchisio (yellow card) 41'; Higuaín 57', (yellow card) 73'; Cuadrado 65'; Bernardeschi (yellow card) 89'	Report	Ciciretti 19'; Cataldi (yellow card) 37'; Chibsah (yellow card) 45+2'; Antei (yellow card) 85'	Stadium: Allianz Stadium; Attendance: 40,863; Referee: Rosario Abisso

19 November 2017 13	Sampdoria	3–2	Juventus	Genoa
15:00 CET (UTC+01:00)	Zapata 52'; Quagliarella (yellow card) 54'; Ferrari (yellow card) 63', (goal) 79'; Torreira 71'; Linetty (yellow card) 75'; Ramírez (yellow card) 90'	Report	Bernardeschi (yellow card) 14'; Rugani (yellow card) 59'; Khedira (yellow card) 63'; Higuaín 90+1' (pen.); Dybala 90+4'	Stadium: Stadio Luigi Ferraris; Attendance: 28,786; Referee: Marco Guida

26 November 2017 14	Juventus	3–0	Crotone	Turin
20:45 CET (UTC+01:00)	Benatia (yellow card) 45+1', (goal) 71'; Matuidi (yellow card) 50'; Mandžukić 52'; De Sciglio 60'	Report	Budimir (yellow card) 32'; Rohdén (yellow card) 85'	Stadium: Allianz Stadium; Attendance: 38,963; Referee: Claudio Gavillucci

1 December 2017 15	Napoli	0–1	Juventus	Naples
20:45 CET (UTC+01:00)	Mertens (yellow card) 45+1'; Mário Rui (yellow card) 59'	Report	Higuaín 13'; Chiellini (yellow card) 23'	Stadium: Stadio San Paolo; Attendance: 55,567; Referee: Daniele Orsato

9 December 2017 16	Juventus	0–0	Internazionale	Turin
20:45 CET (UTC+01:00)	Benatia (yellow card) 27'; Higuaín (yellow card) 39'	Report	Brozović (yellow card) 29'; Perišić (yellow card) 40'; Santon (yellow card) 61'; D'Ambrosio (yellow card) 88'; Vecino (yellow card) 90+1'	Stadium: Allianz Stadium; Attendance: 41,418; Referee: Paolo Valeri

17 December 2017 17	Bologna	0–3	Juventus	Bologna
15:00 CET (UTC+01:00)	Masina (yellow card) 51'; Mbaye (yellow card) 60'; Petković (yellow card) 86'	Report	Pjanić 27'; Higuaín (yellow card) 31'; Mandžukić 36'; Matuidi 64'	Stadium: Stadio Renato Dall'Ara; Attendance: 29,270; Referee: Luca Banti

23 December 2017 18	Juventus	1–0	Roma	Turin
20:45 CET (UTC+01:00)	Benatia 18'; Cuadrado (yellow card) 52'; Alex Sandro (yellow card) 82'	Report	De Rossi (yellow card) 23'; Pellegrini (yellow card) 87'; Kolarov (yellow card) 90+3'	Stadium: Allianz Stadium; Attendance: 41,100; Referee: Paolo Tagliavento

30 December 2017 19	Hellas Verona	1–3	Juventus	Verona
20:45 CET (UTC+01:00)	Cáceres (yellow card) 41', (goal) 59'; Rômulo (yellow card) 85'	Report	Matuidi 6'; Dybala 72', 77'	Stadium: Stadio Marc'Antonio Bentegodi; Attendance: 29,215; Referee: Paolo Mazzoleni

6 January 2018 20	Cagliari	0–1	Juventus	Cagliari
20:45 CET (UTC+01:00)	Pavoletti (yellow card) 75'	Report	Matuidi (yellow card) 42'; Bernardeschi (yellow card) 51', (goal) 74'	Stadium: Sardegna Arena; Attendance: 16,233; Referee: Gianpaolo Calvarese

22 January 2018 21	Juventus	1–0	Genoa	Turin
20:45 CET (UTC+01:00)	Douglas Costa 16'; Alex Sandro (yellow card) 67'	Report	Spolli (yellow card) 25'; Rosi (yellow card) 44'; Pandev (yellow card) 72'; Perin (yellow card) 84'; Galabinov (yellow card) 85'	Stadium: Allianz Stadium; Attendance: 29,412; Referee: Marco Di Bello

27 January 2018 22	Chievo	0–2	Juventus	Verona
20:45 CET (UTC+01:00)	Bastien (yellow card) 35' (yellow-red card) 37'; Cacciatore (red card) 61'	Report	Asamoah (yellow card) 22'; Higuaín (yellow card) 32', (goal) 88'; Khedira 67'	Stadium: Stadio Marc'Antonio Bentegodi; Attendance: 27,000; Referee: Fabio Maresca

4 February 2018 23	Juventus	7–0	Sassuolo	Turin
15:00 CET (UTC+01:00)	Alex Sandro 9'; Khedira 24', 27'; Pjanić 38'; Higuaín 63', 74', 83'	Report	Peluso (yellow card) 33'; Magnanelli (yellow card) 86'	Stadium: Allianz Stadium; Attendance: 40,400; Referee: Fabrizio Pasqua

9 February 2018 24	Fiorentina	0–2	Juventus	Florence
20:45 CET (UTC+01:00)	Dias (yellow card) 37'; Veretout (yellow card) 67'; Théréau (yellow card) 84'; Biraghi (yellow card) 89'	Report	Lichtsteiner (yellow card) 24'; Alex Sandro (yellow card) 39'; Bernardeschi 56'; Higuaín 86'; Benatia (yellow card) 90+4'	Stadium: Stadio Artemio Franchi; Attendance: 32,563; Referee: Marco Guida

18 February 2018 25	Torino	0–1	Juventus	Turin
12:30 CET (UTC+01:00)	Molinaro (yellow card) 90+2'	Report	Alex Sandro 33'; De Sciglio (yellow card) 65'	Stadium: Stadio Olimpico Grande Torino; Attendance: 26,105; Referee: Daniele Orsato

3 March 2018 27	Lazio	0–1	Juventus	Rome
18:00 CET (UTC+01:00)	Luis Alberto (yellow card) 27'; Luiz Felipe (yellow card) 30'; Lulić (yellow card) 88'	Report	Lichtsteiner (yellow card) 45+3'; Alex Sandro (yellow card) 75'; Dybala 90+3'	Stadium: Stadio Olimpico; Attendance: 37,704; Referee: Luca Banti

11 March 2018 28	Juventus	2–0	Udinese	Turin
15:00 CET (UTC+01:00)	Chiellini (yellow card) 2'; Dybala 20', 49'; Higauín (penalty missed) 38'	Report	Angella (yellow card) 19'; Perica (yellow card) 90'	Stadium: Allianz Stadium; Attendance: 40,300; Referee: Piero Giacomelli

14 March 2018 26	Juventus	2–0	Atalanta	Turin
18:00 CET (UTC+01:00)	Higuaín 29'; Alex Sandro (yellow card) 72'; Matuidi 81'; Benatia (yellow card) 82'; Asamoah (yellow card) 90+1'	Report	Hateboer (yellow card) 47'; Cristante (yellow card) 61'; Mancini (yellow card) 78' (yellow-red card) 79'; De Roon (yellow card) 82'	Stadium: Allianz Stadium; Attendance: 36,753; Referee: Maurizio Mariani
Note: Postponed due to inclement weather; originally scheduled for 25 February 2018.

17 March 2018 29	SPAL	0–0	Juventus	Ferrara
20:45 CET (UTC+01:00)	Kurtić (yellow card) 32'; Schiattarella (yellow card) 60'; Costa (yellow card) 66'; Everton Luiz (yellow card) 85'	Report	Douglas Costa (yellow card) 69'; Pjanić (yellow card) 79'	Stadium: Stadio Paolo Mazza; Attendance: 13,135; Referee: Davide Massa

31 March 2018 30	Juventus	3–1	AC Milan	Turin
20:45 CEST (UTC+02:00)	Dybala 8'; Benatia (yellow card) 38'; Cuadrado 79'; Khedira 87'	Report	Bonucci 28'; Rodríguez (yellow card) 39'; Biglia (yellow card) 52'; Montolivo (yellow card) 82'	Stadium: Allianz Stadium; Attendance: 41,156; Referee: Paolo Mazzoleni

7 April 2018 31	Benevento	2–4	Juventus	Benevento
15:00 CEST (UTC+02:00)	Diabaté 24', 51'	Report	Dybala 16', 45+3' (pen.), 74' (pen.); Mandžukić (yellow card) 37'; Douglas Costa 82'	Stadium: Stadio Ciro Vigorito; Attendance: 16,867; Referee: Fabrizio Pasqua

15 April 2018 32	Juventus	3–0	Sampdoria	Turin
18:00 CEST (UTC+02:00)	Asamoah (yellow card) 33'; Mandžukić 45'; Höwedes (yellow card) 52', (goal) 60'; Khedira 75'	Report		Stadium: Allianz Stadium; Attendance: 40,121; Referee: Maurizio Mariani

18 April 2018 33	Crotone	1–1	Juventus	Crotone
20:45 CEST (UTC+02:00)	Mandragora (yellow card) 36'; Simy 65'	Report	Alex Sandro 16'; Benatia (yellow card) 73'; Lichtsteiner (yellow card) 84'	Stadium: Stadio Ezio Scida; Attendance: 15,021; Referee: Michael Fabbri

22 April 2018 34	Juventus	0–1	Napoli	Turin
20:45 CEST (UTC+02:00)	Benatia (yellow card) 9'; Asamoah (yellow card) 10'; Pjanić (yellow card) 27'	Report	Albiol (yellow card) 16'; Koulibaly 90'	Stadium: Allianz Stadium; Attendance: 40,114; Referee: Gianluca Rocchi

28 April 2018 35	Internazionale	2–3	Juventus	Milan
20:45 CEST (UTC+02:00)	Vecino (red card) 15'; Icardi 52'; D'Ambrosio (yellow card) 58'; Barzagli 65' (o.g.); Brozović (yellow card) 88'	Report	Cuadrado (yellow card) 5'; Douglas Costa 13'; Pjanić (yellow card) 21'; Barzagli (yellow card) 45'; Mandžukić (yellow card) 52'; Alex Sandro (yellow card) 77'; Škriniar 87' (o.g.); Higuaín 89'	Stadium: San Siro; Attendance: 78,328; Referee: Daniele Orsato

5 May 2018 36	Juventus	3–1	Bologna	Turin
20:45 CEST (UTC+02:00)	Cuadrado (yellow card) 14'; Rugani (yellow card) 27'; De Maio 52' (o.g.); Khedira 63'; Dybala 69'	Report	Poli (yellow card) 18'; Verdi 30' (pen.); Crisetig (yellow card) 61'; Palacio (yellow card) 90'	Stadium: Allianz Stadium; Attendance: 40,714; Referee: Massimiliano Irrati

13 May 2018 37	Roma	0–0	Juventus	Rome
20:45 CEST (UTC+02:00)	Nainggolan (yellow card) 63' (yellow-red card) 68'	Report	Pjanić (yellow card) 32'; Alex Sandro (yellow card) 43'	Stadium: Stadio Olimpico; Attendance: 53,091; Referee: Paolo Tagliavento

19 May 2018 38	Juventus	2–1	Hellas Verona	Turin
15:00 CEST (UTC+02:00)	Rugani 49'; Pjanić 52'; Lichtsteiner (penalty missed) 85'	Report	Fares (yellow card) 51'; Fossati (yellow card) 58'; Cerci 76'	Stadium: Allianz Stadium; Attendance: 40,380; Referee: Riccardo Pinzani

=== Coppa Italia ===
20 December 2017 Round of 16	Juventus	2–0	Genoa	Turin
20:45 CET (UTC+01:00)	Bentancur (yellow card) 18'; Lichtsteiner (yellow card) 19'; Dybala 42'; Higuaín 76'	Report	Gentiletti (yellow card) 36'; Galabinov (yellow card) 44'; Pellegri (yellow card) 72'; Ricci (yellow card) 90+1'	Stadium: Allianz Stadium; Attendance: 39,969; Referee: Fabio Maresca

3 January 2018 Quarter-finals	Juventus	2–0	Torino	Turin
20:45 CET (UTC+01:00)	Douglas Costa 15'; Mandžukić 67'; Rugani (yellow card) 89'	Report	Burdisso (yellow card) 70'	Stadium: Allianz Stadium; Attendance: 37,763; Referee: Daniele Doveri

30 January 2018 Semi-finals; First leg	Atalanta	0–1	Juventus	Bergamo
20:45 CET (UTC+01:00)	Gómez (penalty missed) 25'; Toloi (yellow card) 76'; Masiello (yellow card) 81'	Report	Higuaín 3'; Chiellini (yellow card) 50'; Bentancur (yellow card) 90+4'	Stadium: Stadio Atleti Azzurri d'Italia; Attendance: 16,406; Referee: Paolo Valeri

28 February 2018 Semi-finals; Second leg	Juventus	1–0 (2–0 agg.)	Atalanta	Turin
17:30 CET (UTC+01:00)	Chiellini (yellow card) 13'; Pjanić (yellow card) 45+1', (goal) 75' (pen.); Matuidi (yellow card) 50'; Alex Sandro (yellow card) 78'; Mandžukić (yellow card) 87'	Report	Gómez (yellow card) 35'; Masiello (yellow card) 69'	Stadium: Allianz Stadium; Attendance: 38,417; Referee: Michael Fabbri

9 May 2018 Final	Juventus	4–0	AC Milan	Rome
21:00 CEST (UTC+02:00)	Benatia 56', 64'; Douglas Costa 61', (yellow card) 62'; Kalinić 76' (o.g.)	Report	Calabria (yellow card) 73'	Stadium: Stadio Olimpico; Attendance: 64,983; Referee: Antonio Damato

=== UEFA Champions League ===
==== Group stage ====
Pos	Team	Pld	W	D	L	GF	GA	GD	Pts	Qualification	BAR	JUV	SPO	OLY
1	(Spain) Barcelona	6	4	2	0	9	1	+8	14	Advance to knockout phase	—	3–0	2–0	3–1
2	(Italy) Juventus	6	3	2	1	7	5	+2	11	Advance to knockout phase	0–0	—	2–1	2–0
3	(Portugal) Sporting CP	6	2	1	3	8	9	−1	7	Transfer to Europa League	0–1	1–1	—	3–1
4	(Greece) Olympiacos	6	0	1	5	4	13	−9	1		0–0	0–2	2–3	—

Source: UEFA
Rules for classification: Group stage tiebreakers

12 September 2017 1	Barcelona (Spain)	3–0	(Italy) Juventus	Barcelona, Spain
20:45 CEST (UTC+02:00)	Semedo (yellow card) 35'; Messi 45', 69', (yellow card) 54'; Rakitić 56'	Report	Bentancur (yellow card) 25'; Barzagli (yellow card) 61'; Pjanić (yellow card) 75'; Caligara (yellow card) 89'	Stadium: Camp Nou; Attendance: 78,656; Referee: Damir Skomina (Slovenia)

27 September 2017 2	Juventus (Italy)	2–0	(Greece) Olympiacos	Turin, Italy
20:45 CEST (UTC+02:00)	Higuaín 69'; Mandžukić 80'	Report		Stadium: Allianz Stadium; Attendance: 33,460; Referee: Tobias Stieler (Germany)

18 October 2017 3	Juventus (Italy)	2–1	(Portugal) Sporting CP	Turin, Italy
20:45 CEST (UTC+02:00)	Pjanić 29'; Sturaro (yellow card) 68'; Chiellini (yellow card) 83'; Mandžukić 84'	Report	Alex Sandro 12' (o.g.); Coates (yellow card) 25'; Fernandes (yellow card) 37'	Stadium: Allianz Stadium; Attendance: 36,288; Referee: Michael Oliver (England)

31 October 2017 4	Sporting CP (Portugal)	1–1	(Italy) Juventus	Lisbon, Portugal
20:45 CET (UTC+01:00)	Bruno César 20'; Dost (yellow card) 67'; Acuña (yellow card) 78'; Coates (yellow card) 79'	Report	Mandžukić (yellow card) 26'; Higuaín 79'; Cuadrado (yellow card) 89'	Stadium: Estádio José Alvalade; Attendance: 48,442; Referee: Clément Turpin (France)

22 November 2017 5	Juventus (Italy)	0–0	(Spain) Barcelona	Turin, Italy
20:45 CET (UTC+01:00)	Pjanić (yellow card) 21'; Alex Sandro (yellow card) 72'	Report	Paulinho (yellow card) 30'; Digne (yellow card) 87'; Piqué (yellow card) 90+1'	Stadium: Allianz Stadium; Attendance: 40,876; Referee: Milorad Mažić (Serbia)

5 December 2017 6	Olympiacos (Greece)	0–2	(Italy) Juventus	Piraeus, Greece
20:45 CET (UTC+01:00)	Koutris (yellow card) 32'; Đurđević (yellow card) 43'; Nikolaou (yellow card) 55'	Report	Cuadrado 15'; Benatia (yellow card) 49'; Bernardeschi 90'	Stadium: Karaiskakis Stadium; Attendance: 29,567; Referee: David Fernández Borbalán (Spain)

==== Knockout phase ====
===== Round of 16 =====
13 February 2018 First leg	Juventus (Italy)	2–2	(England) Tottenham Hotspur	Turin, Italy
20:45 CET (UTC+01:00)	Higuaín 2', 9' (pen.), (penalty missed) 45'+1', (yellow card) 60'; Benatia (yellow card) 45'; Bentancur (yellow card) 80'	Report	Davies (yellow card) 8'; Kane 35'; Aurier (yellow card) 47'; Eriksen 71'	Stadium: Allianz Stadium; Attendance: 41,232; Referee: Felix Brych (Germany)

7 March 2018 Second leg	Tottenham Hotspur (England)	1–2 (3–4 agg.)	(Italy) Juventus	London, England
20:45 CET (UTC+01:00)	Vertonghen (yellow card) 28'; Son Heung-min 39'; Alli (yellow card) 56'; Dembélé (yellow card) 88'	Report	Alex Sandro (yellow card) 35'; Pjanić (yellow card) 44'; Benatia (yellow card) 49'; Chiellini (yellow card) 53'; Higuaín 64'; Dybala 67'	Stadium: Wembley Stadium; Attendance: 84,010; Referee: Szymon Marciniak (Poland)

===== Quarter-finals =====
3 April 2018 First leg	Juventus (Italy)	0–3	(Spain) Real Madrid	Turin, Italy
20:45 CEST (UTC+02:00)	Bentancur (yellow card) 27'; Dybala (yellow card) 45' (yellow-red card) 66'	Report	Ronaldo 3', 64'; Ramos (yellow card) 55'; Marcelo 72'; Kovačić (yellow card) 88'	Stadium: Allianz Stadium; Attendance: 40,849; Referee: Cüneyt Çakır (Turkey)

11 April 2018 Second leg	Real Madrid (Spain)	1–3 (4–3 agg.)	(Italy) Juventus	Madrid, Spain
20:45 CEST (UTC+02:00)	Carvajal (yellow card) 22'; Marcelo (yellow card) 81'; Ronaldo 90+8' (pen.), (yellow card) 90+8'	Report	Mandžukić 2', 37', (yellow card) 29'; Pjanić (yellow card) 17'; Lichtsteiner (yellow card) 36'; Matuidi 61'; Alex Sandro (yellow card) 67'; Douglas Costa (yellow card) 73'; Benatia (yellow card) 90'; Buffon (red card) 90+3'	Stadium: Santiago Bernabéu; Attendance: 75,796; Referee: Michael Oliver (England)

== Statistics ==
=== Appearances and goals ===
No.	Pos	Nat	Player	Total		Serie A		Supercoppa Italiana		Coppa Italia		Champions League	
No.	Pos	Nat	Player	Apps	Goals	Apps	Goals	Apps	Goals	Apps	Goals	Apps	Goals
Goalkeepers
1	GK	(Italy) ITA	Gianluigi Buffon	34	0	21	0	1	0	3	0	9	0
16	GK	(Italy) ITA	Carlo Pinsoglio	1	0	0+1	0	0	0	0	0	0	0
23	GK	(Poland) POL	Wojciech Szczęsny	21	0	17	0	0	0	2	0	1+1	0
Defenders
2	DF	(Italy) ITA	Mattia De Sciglio	20	1	10+2	1	0+1	0	1	0	6	0
3	DF	(Italy) ITA	Giorgio Chiellini	38	0	25+1	0	1	0	3+1	0	7	0
4	DF	(Morocco) MAR	Medhi Benatia	32	4	19+1	2	1	0	3	2	7+1	0
12	DF	(Brazil) BRA	Alex Sandro	39	4	23+3	4	1	0	2	0	10	0
15	DF	(Italy) ITA	Andrea Barzagli	38	0	14+11	0	1	0	2+2	0	7+1	0
21	DF	(Germany) GER	Benedikt Höwedes	3	1	3	1	0	0	0	0	0	0
24	DF	(Italy) ITA	Daniele Rugani	26	2	22	2	0	0	2	0	1+1	0
26	DF	(Switzerland) SUI	Stephan Lichtsteiner	32	0	21+6	0	0	0	2+1	0	0+2	0
Midfielders
5	MF	(Bosnia and Herzegovina) BIH	Miralem Pjanić	44	7	28+3	5	1	0	4	1	7+1	1
6	MF	(Germany) GER	Sami Khedira	39	9	24+2	9	1	0	2+2	0	8	0
8	MF	(Italy) ITA	Claudio Marchisio	20	0	9+6	0	0	0	3+1	0	0+1	0
14	MF	(France) FRA	Blaise Matuidi	46	4	27+5	3	0	0	4+1	0	5+4	1
22	MF	(Ghana) GHA	Kwadwo Asamoah	26	0	18+1	0	0	0	4	0	1+2	0
27	MF	(Italy) ITA	Stefano Sturaro	19	0	7+5	0	0	0	2	0	2+3	0
30	MF	(Uruguay) URU	Rodrigo Bentancur	27	0	5+15	0	0	0	1+1	0	3+2	0
Forwards
7	FW	(Colombia) COL	Juan Cuadrado	29	5	15+6	4	1	0	1	0	5+1	1
9	FW	(Argentina) ARG	Gonzalo Higuaín	50	23	32+3	16	1	0	1+3	2	9+1	5
10	FW	(Argentina) ARG	Paulo Dybala	46	26	26+7	22	1	2	3+1	1	8	1
11	FW	(Brazil) BRA	Douglas Costa	47	6	18+13	4	0+1	0	5	2	8+2	0
17	FW	(Croatia) CRO	Mario Mandžukić	43	10	27+5	5	1	0	4	1	5+1	4
33	FW	(Italy) ITA	Federico Bernardeschi	31	5	7+15	4	0+1	0	1+2	0	1+4	1
Players transferred out during the season
38	MF	(Italy) ITA	Fabrizio Caligara	1	0	0	0	0	0	0	0	0+1	0

Last updated: 19 May 2018
Source: Competitions

=== Goalscorers ===
Rank	No.	Pos	Nat	Name	Serie A	Supercoppa	Coppa Italia	UEFA CL	Total
1	10	FW	(Argentina)	Paulo Dybala	22	2	1	1	26
2	9	FW	(Argentina)	Gonzalo Higuaín	16	0	2	5	23
3	17	FW	(Croatia)	Mario Mandžukić	5	0	1	4	10
4	6	MF	(Germany)	Sami Khedira	9	0	0	0	9
5	5	MF	(Bosnia and Herzegovina)	Miralem Pjanić	5	0	1	1	7
6	11	FW	(Brazil)	Douglas Costa	4	0	2	0	6
7	7	FW	(Colombia)	Juan Cuadrado	4	0	0	1	5
7	33	FW	(Italy)	Federico Bernardeschi	4	0	0	1	5
9	4	DF	(Morocco)	Medhi Benatia	2	0	2	0	4
9	12	DF	(Brazil)	Alex Sandro	4	0	0	0	4
9	14	MF	(France)	Blaise Matuidi	3	0	0	1	4
12	24	DF	(Italy)	Daniele Rugani	2	0	0	0	2
13	2	DF	(Italy)	Mattia De Sciglio	1	0	0	0	1
13	21	DF	(Germany)	Benedikt Höwedes	1	0	0	0	1
Own goal					4	0	1	0	5
Totals					86	2	10	14	112

Last updated: 19 May 2018

=== Disciplinary record ===
No.	Pos	Nat	Name	Serie A			Supercoppa			Coppa Italia			UEFA CL			Total		
No.	Pos	Nat	Name	Yellow card	(yellow card) (yellow-red card)	Red card	Yellow card	(yellow card) (yellow-red card)	Red card	Yellow card	(yellow card) (yellow-red card)	Red card	Yellow card	(yellow card) (yellow-red card)	Red card	Yellow card	(yellow card) (yellow-red card)	Red card
1	GK	(Italy)	Gianluigi Buffon	1	0	0	1	0	0	0	0	0	0	0	1	2	0	1
16	GK	(Italy)	Carlo Pinsoglio	0	0	0	0	0	0	0	0	0	0	0	0	0	0	0
23	GK	(Poland)	Wojciech Szczęsny	0	0	0	0	0	0	0	0	0	0	0	0	0	0	0
2	DF	(Italy)	Mattia De Sciglio	1	0	0	0	0	0	0	0	0	0	0	0	1	0	0
3	DF	(Italy)	Giorgio Chiellini	2	0	0	0	0	0	2	0	0	2	0	0	6	0	0
4	DF	(Morocco)	Medhi Benatia	8	0	0	0	0	0	0	0	0	4	0	0	12	0	0
12	DF	(Brazil)	Alex Sandro	8	0	0	0	0	0	1	0	0	3	0	0	12	0	0
15	DF	(Italy)	Andrea Barzagli	2	0	0	0	0	0	0	0	0	1	0	0	3	0	0
21	DF	(Germany)	Benedikt Höwedes	1	0	0	0	0	0	0	0	0	0	0	0	1	0	0
24	DF	(Italy)	Daniele Rugani	3	0	0	0	0	0	1	0	0	0	0	0	4	0	0
26	DF	(Switzerland)	Stephan Lichtsteiner	6	0	0	0	0	0	1	0	0	1	0	0	8	0	0
5	MF	(Bosnia and Herzegovina)	Miralem Pjanić	5	0	0	1	0	0	1	0	0	4	0	0	11	0	0
6	MF	(Germany)	Sami Khedira	1	0	0	0	0	0	0	0	0	0	0	0	1	0	0
8	MF	(Italy)	Claudio Marchisio	1	0	0	0	0	0	0	0	0	0	0	0	1	0	0
14	MF	(France)	Blaise Matuidi	3	0	0	0	0	0	1	0	0	0	0	0	4	0	0
22	MF	(Ghana)	Kwadwo Asamoah	4	0	0	0	0	0	0	0	0	0	0	0	4	0	0
27	MF	(Italy)	Stefano Sturaro	1	0	0	0	0	0	0	0	0	1	0	0	2	0	0
30	MF	(Uruguay)	Rodrigo Bentancur	0	0	0	0	0	0	2	0	0	3	0	0	5	0	0
38	MF	(Italy)	Fabrizio Caligara	0	0	0	0	0	0	0	0	0	1	0	0	1	0	0
7	FW	(Colombia)	Juan Cuadrado	5	0	0	0	0	0	0	0	0	1	0	0	6	0	0
9	FW	(Argentina)	Gonzalo Higuaín	4	0	0	0	0	0	0	0	0	1	0	0	5	0	0
10	FW	(Argentina)	Paulo Dybala	0	0	0	0	0	0	0	0	0	0	1	0	0	1	0
11	FW	(Brazil)	Douglas Costa	1	0	0	0	0	0	1	0	0	1	0	0	3	0	0
17	FW	(Croatia)	Mario Mandžukić	3	1	0	1	0	0	1	0	0	2	0	0	7	1	0
20	FW	(Croatia)	Marko Pjaca	0	0	0	0	0	0	0	0	0	0	0	0	0	0	0
33	FW	(Italy)	Federico Bernardeschi	4	0	0	0	0	0	0	0	0	0	0	0	4	0	0
Totals				64	1	0	3	0	0	11	0	0	25	1	1	98	2	1

Last updated: 19 May 2018
