= First Team: Juventus =

- Genre: Docu-series
- Narrated by: D.B. Sweeney (English); Tommaso Vittorini (Italian)
- Countries of origin: United States; Italy
- Original languages: English; Italian
- No. of seasons: 1 (2 parts)
- No. of episodes: 6

Production
- Executive producers: Michael Antinoro; Fred Christenson; Johnson McKelvy; Will Staeger
- Producer: IMG Original Content
- Cinematography: John Tipton
- Editors: Gabriele Cassia; Andrea Fumagalli; Lorena Luciano; Matt O'Connor; Elena Toccafondi
- Running time: 37–42 minutes

Original release
- Release: February 16 – July 6, 2018

First Team: Juventus is an American and Italian six-part docu-series about the Italian association football club Juventus FC, which was originally released through Netflix on February 16, 2018. It is the first on-demand series about an association football club on Netflix.

The first three episodes came out on Netflix on 16 February 2018, which followed the club throughout the 2017–18 season, by spending time with the players behind the scenes both on and off the field; the other three episodes were released on 6 July 2018. It featured behind the scenes moments with various Juventus players. The voice of D.B. Sweeney (English) and Tommaso Vittorini (Italian) narrated the series. Significant moments of Juventus' season were documented. The first part of the series featured Juventus' season debut with Cagliari, to the defeats with Barcelona and Lazio, the celebrations for the 120 years of club history with president Andrea Agnelli, and the clashes at the top with Napoli and Internazionale and with the decisive Champions League match against Olympiacos.

The second part of the series featured Juventus' round of 16 and quarter-final Champions League Champions League match-ups against Tottenham and Real Madrid respectively, the team's Serie A loss to Napoli in a tight title race, win over Inter, Coppa Italia Final win over Milan, eventual conquest of the league title secured after a draw with Roma, and final farewell to Juventus captain Gianluigi Buffon after 17 years with Juventus, in the last match of the season against Hellas Verona.

== Episodes ==
Series overview
Series	Episodes		Originally released
1	6	3	16 February 2018
1	6	3	6 July 2018

No. overall	No. in season	Title	Directed by	Written by	Original release date
Part 1
1	1	"Episode 1"	Aaron Cohen & Robert Liano	Aaron Cohen & Robert Liano	February 16, 2018
The club marks a new season with an intimate exhibition match for its fans, then begins its quest for Serie A and Champions League trophies.
2	2	"Episode 2"	Aaron Cohen & Robert Liano	Aaron Cohen & Robert Liano	February 16, 2018
Juve face a test of their focus on the pitch. Claudio Marchisio reflects on his lifelong bond with Juve. The club celebrates its 120th anniversary.
3	3	"Episode 3"	Aaron Cohen & Robert Liano	Aaron Cohen & Robert Liano	February 16, 2018
With Christmas just around the corner, Gonzalo Higuaín squares off against his former team, and a new face impacts a must-win Champions League match.
Part 2
4	1	"Episode 1"	Aaron Cohen & Robert Liano	Aaron Cohen & Robert Liano	July 6, 2018
Pressure builds as Juve enter a crucial stretch that includes a Champions League tie with Tottenham. Tragedy hits close to home and rattles the club.
5	2	"Episode 2"	Aaron Cohen & Robert Liano	Aaron Cohen & Robert Liano	July 6, 2018
Juan Cuadrado returns from injury with a bang. Juve look to stay in the Serie A title race, but a massive showdown with Real Madrid looms.
6	3	"Episode 3"	Aaron Cohen & Robert Liano	Aaron Cohen & Robert Liano	July 6, 2018
In the wake of a crushing result, Juve regroup to pursue the Serie A and Coppa Italia championships. Gigi Buffon makes a decision about his future
