= Medhi Benatia =

Moroccan footballer (born 1987)

Medhi Benatia المهدي بن عطية
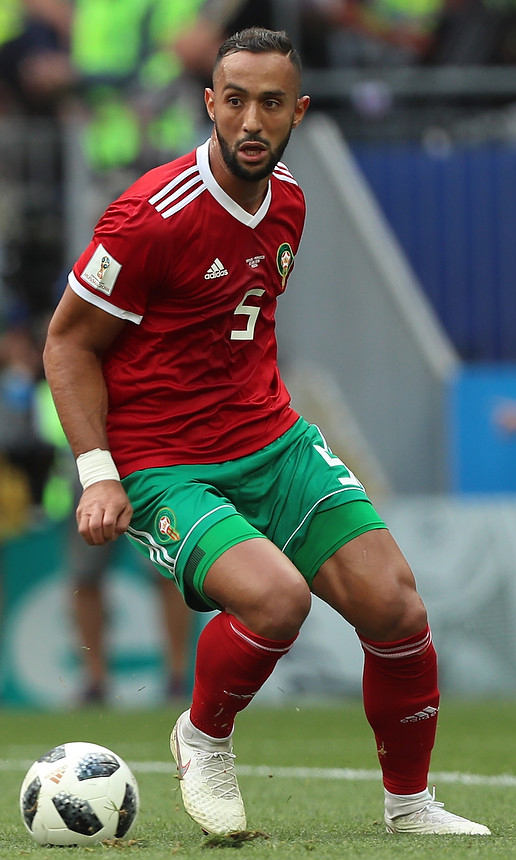
- Benatia playing for Morocco at the 2018 FIFA World Cup

Personal information
- Full name: Medhi Amine El Mouttaqi Benatia
- Date of birth: 17 April 1987 (age 39)
- Place of birth: Courcouronnes, France
- Height: 1.90 m (6 ft 3 in)
- Position: Centre-back

Youth career
- 2000–2002: Clairefontaine
- 2002–2003: Guingamp
- 2003–2006: Marseille

Senior career*
Years	Team	Apps	(Gls)
2006–2008	Marseille	0	(0)
2006–2007	→ Tours (loan)	29	(0)
2007–2008	→ Lorient (loan)	0	(0)
2008–2010	Clermont	57	(2)
2010–2013	Udinese	80	(6)
2013–2014	Roma	33	(5)
2014–2017	Bayern Munich	29	(2)
2016–2017	→ Juventus (loan)	12	(1)
2017–2019	Juventus	28	(2)
2019–2021	Al-Duhail	38	(1)
2021	Fatih Karagümrük	6	(0)
Total		312	(19)

International career
2005	France U18	1	(0)
2006–2007	Morocco U20	4	(0)
2008–2019	Morocco	66	(2)

Managerial career
- 2023–2026: Marseille (sporting director)
- * Club domestic league appearances and goals

Medhi Amine El Mouttaqi Benatia (Note: Though the traditional Arabic spelling is "Mehdi", he spells his name "Medhi". See, for example, his Twitter account, UEFA and Juventus.) (Arabic: المهدي أمين المتقي بن عطية; French pronunciation: [mɛdi bɛnatia]; born 17 April 1987) is a former professional footballer who played as a centre-back. He last served as the sporting director of Ligue 1 club Marseille. Benatia is well known for his tenures throughout France, Italy, and Germany, he represented Morocco at the international level, making 66 international appearances, and most notably captained them to their first World Cup in twenty years.

Benatia began his career at Marseille, being loaned out to Tours and Lorient before joining Clermont in 2008. Two years later he joined Udinese, spending three seasons there before transferring to Roma. After helping the side finish as Serie A runners-up in his only campaign there, Benatia was signed by Bayern Munich for €26 million, winning the Bundesliga in both of his seasons at the club. In 2016 he moved to Juventus, initially on loan, and was later signed permanently by the club in 2017; he won three league titles with the side, and helped them reach the Champions League final in 2017. Following stints with Al-Duhail in Qatar and Fatih Karagümrük in Turkey, Benatia retired from professional football in 2021.

Born and raised in France to a Moroccan father and an Algerian mother, Benatia initially represented France at under-18 level. He then switched to represent his father's country at under-20 level, making his senior international debut in 2008. Benatia represented Morocco at four Africa Cup of Nations tournaments and the 2018 FIFA World Cup. In 2019, Benatia announced his retirement from international football, having earned 66 caps.

== Early life ==
Benatia was born in Courcouronnes, France, to a Moroccan father and an Algerian mother.

== Club career ==
=== Marseille ===
Benatia joined Marseille in 2003, and signed his first professional contract with them two years later. After loan spells at Tours and Lorient, he left for Ligue 2 club Clermont on 1 July 2008 on a free transfer.

=== Udinese ===
On 1 July 2010, Benatia signed for Serie A club Udinese, again on a free transfer. He made 80 league appearances for Udinese, scoring six goals.

=== Roma ===
On 13 July 2013, Benatia signed for Roma on a five-year contract in a €13.5 million transfer, with Nico López and Valerio Verre going the other way on co-ownership as part of the same deal. On 26 September, Benatia scored his first goal for the club in a 2–0 victory against Sampdoria. After further goals against Bologna, Catania. and Chievo Verona in the second half of the season, he ended the season with five goals from 33 games.

=== Bayern Munich ===
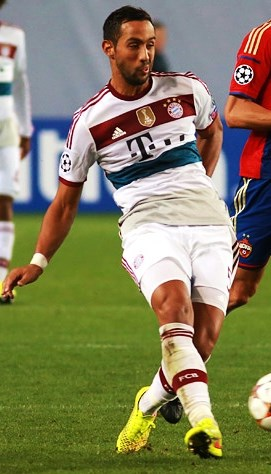
Benatia playing for Bayern Munich in 2014

On 27 August 2014, Bayern Munich announced that they had signed Benatia on a five-year deal for a fee of €26 million. Bayern Munich beat Manchester City, Chelsea, Barcelona and Real Madrid, who were said to be also interested in signing him. He admitted he was disappointed to leave Roma but was told he had to go because the club needed the money. Upon hearing this, Roma President James Pallotta was furious and responded by saying he was sold for being a "poisonous liar".

On 17 September 2014, Benatia made his official debut for Bayern in a 1–0 home win against Manchester City, for the opening match of the 2014–15 UEFA Champions League season, where he played for 85 minutes, completing 93% of his passes. In the return match at Manchester City, he was sent off in the 20th minute for denying Sergio Agüero a clear goalscoring opportunity; the subsequent penalty was converted by Agüero and City went on to win 3–2.

Benatia scored his first goal for Bayern on 13 December, opening the scoring in a 4–0 win at FC Augsburg with a header; this result put his club 10 points clear at the top of the Bundesliga table. On 12 May 2015, Benatia scored his first Champions League goal, heading Bayern into the lead in their Champions League semi-final second leg against Barcelona; although his team won 3–2, they were eliminated 5–3 on aggregate.

He started the 2015–16 season in the German Super Cup, which Bayern lost in a penalty shootout after a 1–1 draw at VfL Wolfsburg. On 14 August, he headed Xabi Alonso's free kick for the first goal of the new Bundesliga season in a 5–0 thrashing of Hamburger SV.

=== Juventus ===
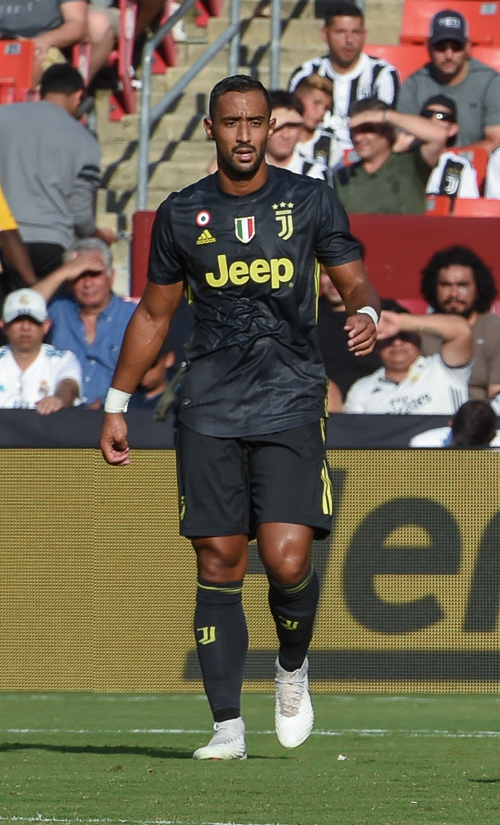
Benatia with Juventus in the 2018–19 preseason

On 15 July 2016, Italian champions Juventus signed Benatia on a season-long loan for €3 million, with an option to buy for an extra €17 million at the end of season. He made his club debut on 27 August, in a 1–0 away win over Lazio in Serie A.

On 10 March 2017, Benatia scored his first goal for Juventus in a 2–1 win over A.C. Milan in Serie A, at the Juventus Stadium. On 12 May, Juventus exercised the option to permanently sign Benatia until 2020.

In May 2017, Benatia walked out of an interview with television channel RAI Due when he heard racist abuse towards him in his earpiece. The company apologised.

On 11 April 2018, Juventus were leading 3–0 away to Real Madrid in the quarter-finals of the Champions League, a score that would have taken the game to extra time as Juventus lost the first leg at home 3–0. Referee Michael Oliver awarded a 93rd minute injury time penalty to Real Madrid after Benatia challenged Lucas Vázquez in the box; the penalty was subsequently converted by Cristiano Ronaldo for a final 4–3 aggregate loss. Benatia said after the game that Oliver's call made him "more and more disgusted by the world of football". On 9 May, he scored twice in Juventus's 4–0 victory over Milan in the 2018 Coppa Italia Final, at the Stadio Olimpico in Rome.

=== Al-Duhail ===
After making only five Serie A appearances during the first half of the 2018–19 season, in January 2019, it was reported that Benatia had completed a move to Qatar Stars League club Al-Duhail. On 28 January, Juventus announced the transfer fee, which was €8 million plus a maximum of €2 million in bonuses. He made his debut for Al-Duhail on 16 February, in a 1–0 home win over Al Sailiya in the Qatar Stars League.

=== Fatih Karagümrük ===
In the summer of 2021, he moved to Süper Lig club Fatih Karagümrük. He made six league appearances before retiring from professional football on 9 December 2021.

== International career ==
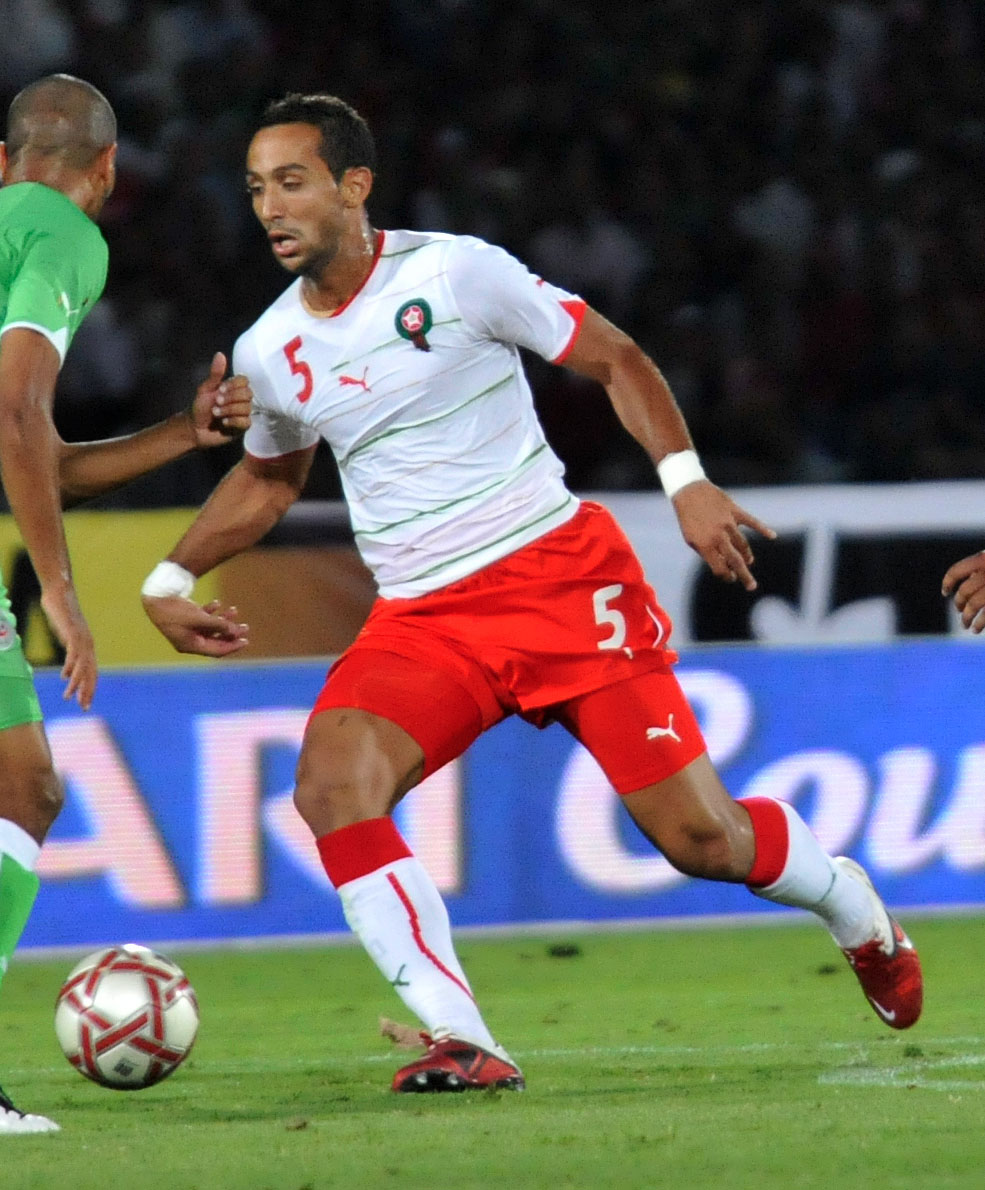
Benatia playing against Algeria in June 2011

Benatia made his international debut for Morocco on 19 November 2008 in a 3–0 friendly win over Zambia at the Stade Mohammed V in Casablanca. He scored his first goal for them on 4 June 2011, opening a 4–0 win over rivals Algeria at the Marrakesh Stadium, in qualification for the 2012 Africa Cup of Nations.

He was part of their squad at the final tournament in Equatorial Guinea and Gabon, and played in their first two matches of an eventual group stage exit, defeats to Tunisia and Gabon.

Benatia was Morocco's captain at the 2017 Africa Cup of Nations in Gabon and played every minute until the 1–0 elimination by Egypt in the quarter-finals. In March that year, he dropped himself from the national team until he became a regular for Juventus, stating "I think it’s unfair to come and play for the national team when I lack competitive football and take the place of someone who is in a better position". On 11 November, he scored in a 2–0 win away to the Ivory Coast that qualified the Atlas Lions to the 2018 FIFA World Cup, their first such tournament for 20 years. He called it "the most beautiful moment of my career".

Benatia retired from international duty in October 2019, having also played at the 2018 World Cup and 2019 Africa Cup of Nations.

== After retirement ==
On 30 November 2023, almost two years after retiring as a footballer, Benatia was appointed as sporting director of Marseille, his first professional club. He left his position at the end of the 2025–26 season, following an official announcement made on 16 May 2026.

== Style of play ==
A tall, large, strong, and athletic defender, with good technique, ball-playing ability, defensive skills, and an ability to organise his defence; during his time in Italy, Benatia earned a reputation as one of the best centre-backs in Serie A. He was known in particular for his tackling and ability in the air.

== Career statistics ==
=== Club ===
Appearances and goals by club, season and competition
Club	Season	League			National cup (Note: Includes Coupe de France, Coppa Italia, DFB-Pokal)		League cup (Note: Includes Coupe de la Ligue)		Continental		Other		Total	
Club	Season	Division	Apps	Goals	Apps	Goals	Apps	Goals	Apps	Goals	Apps	Goals	Apps	Goals
Tours (loan)	2006–07	Ligue 2	29	0	1	0	0	0	—		—		30	0
Lorient (loan)	2007–08	Ligue 1	0	0	1	0	0	0	—		—		1	0
Clermont	2008–09	Ligue 2	27	1	1	0	0	0	—		—		28	1
Clermont	2009–10	Ligue 2	30	1	0	0	2	0	—		—		32	1
Clermont	Total		57	2	1	0	2	0	—		—		60	2
Udinese	2010–11	Serie A	34	3	0	0	—		—		—		34	3
Udinese	2011–12	Serie A	27	1	0	0	—		11 (Note: Two appearances in UEFA Champions League, nine appearances and one goal in UEFA Europa League)	1	—		38	2
Udinese	2012–13	Serie A	19	2	0	0	—		6 (Note: Two appearances in UEFA Champions League, four appearances in UEFA Europa League)	0	—		25	2
Udinese	Total		80	6	0	0	—		17	1	—		97	7
Roma	2013–14	Serie A	33	5	4	0	—		—		—		37	5
Bayern Munich	2014–15	Bundesliga	15	1	2	0	—		7 (Note: Appearances in UEFA Champions League)	1	0	0	24	2
Bayern Munich	2015–16	Bundesliga	14	1	1	0	—		6	0	1 (Note: Appearance in DFL-Supercup)	0	22	1
Bayern Munich	Total		29	2	3	0	—		13	1	1	0	46	3
Juventus	2016–17	Serie A	15	1	1	0	—		5	0	0	0	21	1
Juventus	2017–18	Serie A	20	2	3	2	—		8	0	1 (Note: Appearance in Supercoppa Italiana)	0	32	4
Juventus	2018–19	Serie A	5	0	0	0	—		1	0	0	0	6	0
Juventus	Total		40	3	4	2	—		14	0	1	0	59	5
Al-Duhail	2018–19	Qatar Stars League	7	1	1	0	0	0	7 (Note: Appearances in AFC Champions League)	1	—		15	2
Al-Duhail	2019–20	Qatar Stars League	18	0	2	0	0	0	6	0	—		26	0
Al-Duhail	2020–21	Qatar Stars League	13	0	1	0	0	0	5	0	—		19	0
Al-Duhail	Total		38	1	4	0	0	0	18	1	—		60	2
Fatih Karagümrük	2021–22	Süper Lig	6	0	0	0	—		—		—		6	0
Career total			312	19	18	2	2	0	62	3	2	0	396	24

=== International ===
Appearances and goals by national team and year
National team	Year	Apps	Goals
Morocco	2009	7	0
Morocco	2010	4	0
Morocco	2011	5	1
Morocco	2012	8	0
Morocco	2013	7	0
Morocco	2014	4	0
Morocco	2015	4	0
Morocco	2016	4	0
Morocco	2017	9	1
Morocco	2018	8	0
Morocco	2019	5	0
Total		66	2

Scores and results list Morocco's goal tally first, score column indicates score after each Benatia goal.

List of international goals scored by Medhi Benatia
No.	Date	Venue	Opponent	Score	Result	Competition
1	4 June 2011	Marrakesh Stadium, Marrakesh, Morocco	Algeria	1–0	4–0	2012 Africa Cup of Nations qualification
2	11 November 2017	Stade Félix Houphouët-Boigny, Abidjan, Ivory Coast	Ivory Coast	2–0	2–0	2018 FIFA World Cup qualification

== Honours ==
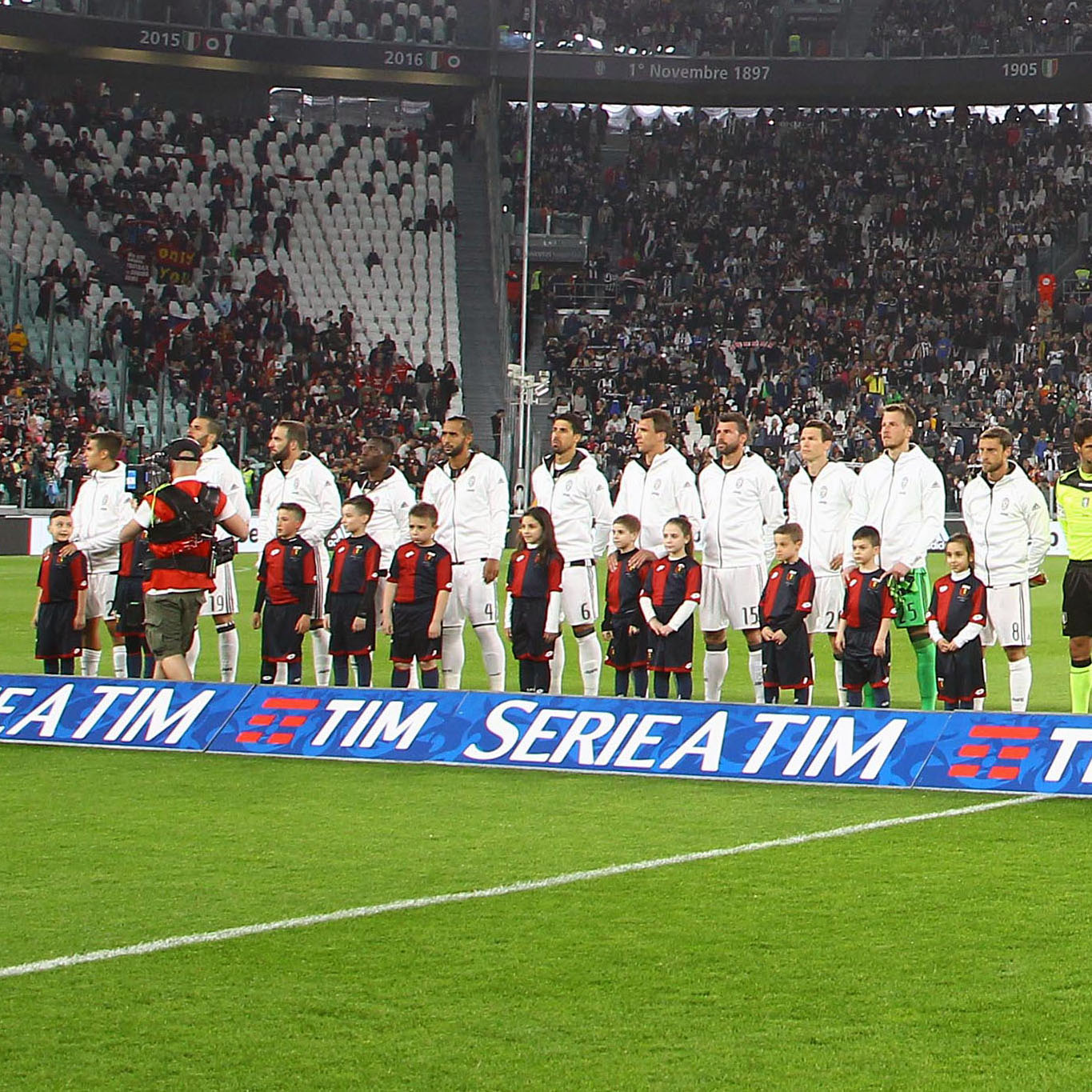
Benatia (fifth from left) in Juventus' 2016–17 double-winning squad

Bayern Munich

- Bundesliga: 2014–15, 2015–16
- DFB-Pokal: 2015–16

Juventus

- Serie A: 2016–17, 2017–18, 2018–19
- Coppa Italia: 2016–17, 2017–18
- Supercoppa Italiana: 2018
- UEFA Champions League runner-up: 2016–17

Al-Duhail

- Qatar Stars League: 2019–20
- Qatar Emir Cup: 2019–20
- Qatar Cup runner-up: 2020

Individual

- CAF Team of the Year: 2013, 2014, 2015, 2018
- Mars d'Or (Best Moroccan Player): 2013, 2014
- El Heddaf Arab Footballer of the Year: 2015
- A.S. Roma Player of the Season: 2013–14
- "Gran Galà del calcio AIC" Best Central Defender: 2014
- European Sports Media's European Team of the Season: 2013–14
- Serie A Team of the Year: 2013–14
- Qatar Stars League Team of the Year: 2019–20
- Globe Soccer Awards Best Arab Player of the Year: 2014
- France Football Africa Team of the Year: 2017
- Goal Africa Team of the Year: 2018
- IFFHS CAF Men's Team of the Decade 2011–2020
- IFFHS All-time Morocco Men's Dream Team
