= Giorgio Siani =

Italian footballer

Personal information
- Date of birth: 9 January 1997 (age 29)
- Place of birth: Milan, Italy
- Height: 1.84 m (6 ft 0 in)
- Position: Winger

Team information
- Current team: Villa Valle
- Number: 11

Youth career
- –2015: Atalanta
- 2014–2015: → Varese (loan)
- 2015–2016: Juventus
- 2015–2016: → Atalanta (loan)
- 2016: → Carpi (loan)

Senior career*
Years	Team	Apps	(Gls)
2016–2019	Juventus	0	(0)
2016–2017	→ Tuttocuoio (loan)	9	(0)
2017–2018	→ Den Bosch (loan)	3	(1)
2018–2019	→ Ravenna (loan)	25	(2)
2019–2020	Savona	18	(8)
2020–2021	Piacenza	8	(0)
2021	Caronnese	26	(5)
2021–2022	Arconatese	35	(10)
2022–2023	Fanfulla	38	(10)
2023–	Villa Valle	18	(2)
- * Club domestic league appearances and goals as of 18:41, 26 December 2023 (UTC)

Giorgio Siani (born 9 January 1997) is an Italian footballer who plays mainly as a winger for Serie D club Villa Valle.

== Career ==
=== Early career ===
Siani was born in Milan in 1997, and began his career in the youth team of Serie A side Atalanta, located in Lombardy. He made a loan move to Varese before being signed to the youth teams of Serie A giants Juventus upon his return to Bergamo. He was loaned back to Atalanta and then on to Carpi for 6 months in 2016.

=== Tuttocuoio ===
Once he had returned from his loan to Carpi, Siani signed on loan to Lega Pro side Tuttocuoio for one year. He was an unused substitute in the 3–2 Coppa Italia loss to Casertana. His debut in the league on 9 October 2016, coming on as a substitute in a 1–4 loss to Alessandria, playing the final 14 minutes. His first goal for the club came in the last-16 stage of the Coppa Italia Lega Pro on 23 November 2016, when he started and scored twice in an eventual 3–1 win over Pontedera as Tuttocuoio progressed.

=== Serie D ===
On 10 September 2019, he joined Serie D club Savona.

=== Piacenza ===
On 7 August 2020 he moved to Serie C club Piacenza.

=== Back to Serie D ===
On 5 January 2021, he signed with Serie D club Caronnese.
