= Daniele Rugani =

Italian footballer (born 1994)

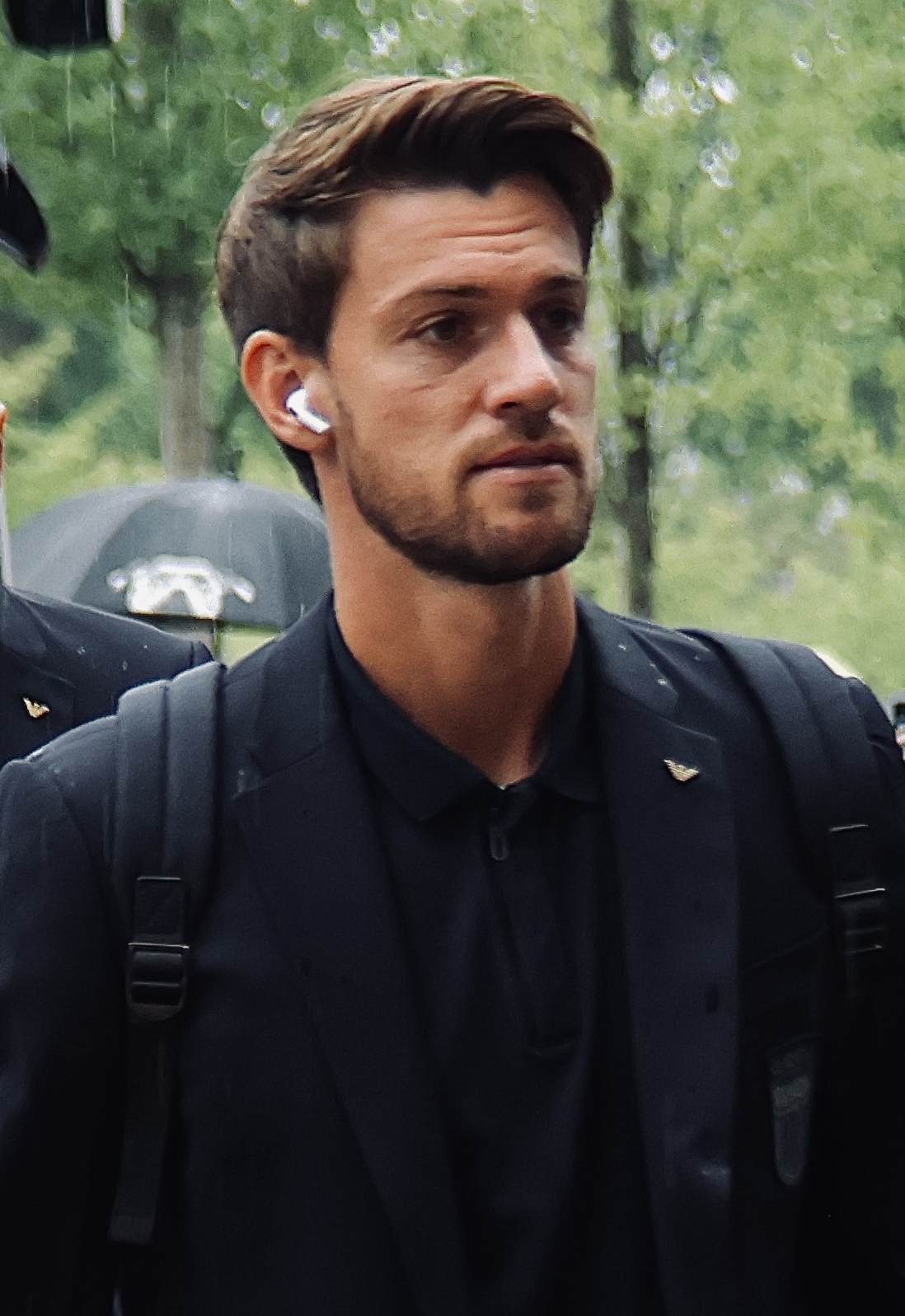
- Rugani with Italy in 2025

Personal information
- Full name: Daniele Rugani
- Date of birth: 29 July 1994 (age 32)
- Place of birth: Lucca, Tuscany, Italy
- Height: 1.90 m (6 ft 3 in)
- Positions: Centre-back; full-back

Team information
- Current team: Juventus
- Number: 24

Youth career
- 2000–2013: Empoli
- 2012–2013: → Juventus (loan)

Senior career*
Years	Team	Apps	(Gls)
2013–	Juventus	123	(8)
2013–2015	→ Empoli (loan)	78	(5)
2020–2021	→ Rennes (loan)	1	(0)
2021	→ Cagliari (loan)	16	(1)
2024–2025	→ Ajax (loan)	15	(0)
2026	→ Fiorentina (loan)	6	(0)

International career
2010–2011	Italy U17	13	(3)
2011–2012	Italy U18	9	(0)
2012–2013	Italy U19	11	(0)
2013	Italy U20	2	(0)
2014–2017	Italy U21	19	(2)
2016–2018	Italy	7	(0)
- * Club domestic league appearances and goals as of 23:18, 22 May 2026 (UTC)

Daniele Rugani (Note: Italian pronunciation: [daˈnjɛːle ruˈɡaːni]) (born 29 July 1994) is an Italian professional footballer who plays as a centre-back or full-back for Serie A club Juventus.

Rugani began his professional club career with Empoli in Serie B in 2013, where he immediately helped the club achieve Serie A promotion, and was named the 2014 Serie B Footballer of the Year. His defensive performances the following season saw him named to the 2015 Serie A Team of the Year, and earned him a transfer to Juventus, where he won five consecutive Serie A titles, two Coppa Italia titles, and two Supercoppa Italiana titles.

Internationally, Rugani has represented the Italy U21 team at the UEFA European Under-21 Championship in 2015 and 2017, and made his senior debut for Italy in 2016.

== Club career ==
=== Early career ===
Born in Lucca, Italy, Rugani began his footballing career with Tuscan side Empoli in 2000, at the age of 6. He remained within the club's youth academy for twelve full seasons, before being transferred to Serie A side Juventus on loan in August 2012, for €150,000 fee. After joining Juventus, Rugani was registered with the club's Primavera (under-19) youth squad where he was a regular starter within the side during the 2012–13 season, winning the Coppa Italia Primavera.

After his successes during his first season with Juventus, Rugani was purchased by the club on 31 July 2013 in a co-ownership deal for €500,000 and then sent back to Empoli on a season-long loan deal ahead of their 2013–14 Serie B campaign.

At age 20, Rugani was Empoli's star defender during their successful campaign, as he finished the season having made 40 appearances and scoring 2 goals for the club. He scored his first career goal from a header off of a corner on 22 March 2014, in a 4–0 home win over Reggina. The club finished the season in 2nd place, thus achieving automatic promotion to Serie A, alongside champions Palermo.

On 18 June 2014, it was confirmed that the co-ownership agreement between the two clubs would be renewed, with the player remaining with newly promoted Empoli for the 2014–15 Serie A campaign on loan from Juventus. Rugani made his Serie A debut on 31 August 2014, at the age of 20, in a 2–0 away defeat to Udinese, later scoring his first goal in Serie A on 20 September, in a 2–2 away draw against Cesena.

On 2 February 2015, Juventus bought out the remaining half of Daniele Rugani's registration rights from Empoli, for an additional €3.5 million. Rugani was a key player for Empoli that season, appearing in all 38 of Empoli's league matches that season without being substituted or booked, in addition to scoring 3 goals, as the club finished the league in 15th place.

=== Juventus ===
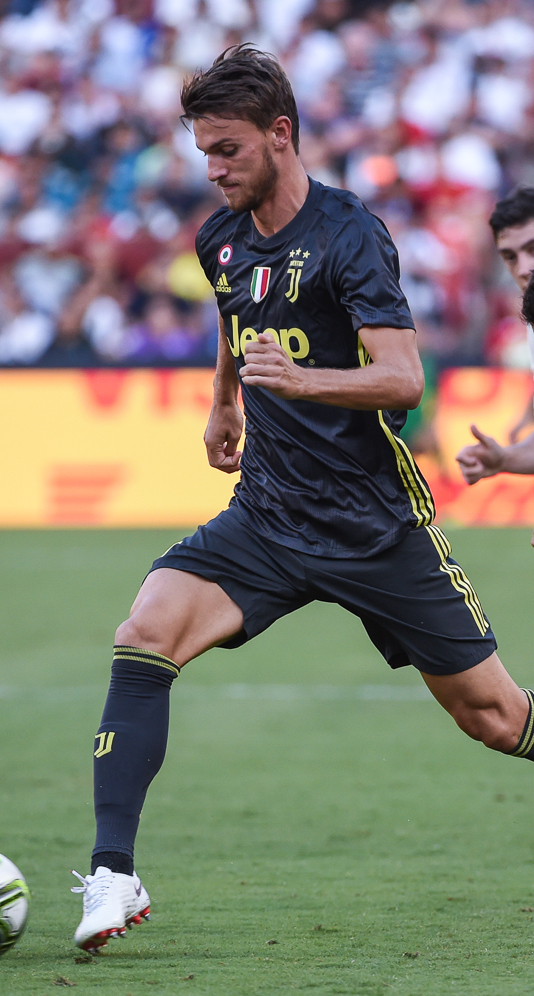
Rugani playing for Juventus in 2018

In the summer of 2015, Rugani officially returned to Juventus. He made his debut with the club on 30 September 2015, coming on as a substitute in a 2–0 home win over Sevilla in the UEFA Champions League group stage, also making his European debut in the process. He made his first start with the club on 16 December, in a 4–0 win over cross-city rivals Torino in the Derby della Mole in the round of 16 of the Coppa Italia. His league debut with the club came four days later, as he came on for veteran defender Andrea Barzagli in the 56th minute of a 3–2 away win over Carpi.

He made his first league start for the club in a 2–1 away win over Sampdoria in Serie A, on 10 January 2016. On 24 April, Rugani was booked for the first time in his entire Serie A career in his 53rd Serie A appearance. He received a yellow card in the 72nd minute of a 2–1 away win over Fiorentina; he had last been carded at club level with Empoli, on 1 March 2014, in an away Serie B fixture against Siena. Following Napoli's loss to Roma the following day, Juventus clinched the league title with three games to spare.

On 21 September 2016, Rugani made his first appearance of the season and scored his first goal for Juventus, in a 4–0 home win over Cagliari. On 7 December, Rugani scored his first ever UEFA Champions League goal on his third appearance in the competition, in a 2–0 home win over Dinamo Zagreb. On 14 December, Rugani extended his stay at Juventus, signing a new contract that would run until 2021.

Following the sale of Leonardo Bonucci to Milan in the summer of 2017, the 2017–18 season saw Rugani receive more playing time in central defence with Juventus. In total, he made 22 Serie A appearances for Juventus, and 26 in all competitions, scoring two goals, both of which came in the league, as Juventus once again finished the season by winning a domestic double of the Serie A and Coppa Italia titles.

On 30 March 2019, Rugani extended his contract with Juventus, keeping him at the club until June 2023. He made his 100th appearance for Juventus on 29 July 2020, in a 2–0 away defeat to Cagliari, in Serie A.

On 25 February 2024, Rugani netted the decisive goal for Juventus, securing a 3–2 victory at home against Frosinone, in addition to concluding his team's four-game winless run. Later that year, on 24 May, he extended his contract with Juventus until 2026.

On 20 October 2025, Rugani renewed his contract with Juventus, this time until 30 June 2028.

==== Loan to Rennes ====
On 3 October 2020, Rugani was loaned out to Rennes for the season at a cost of €1.5 million.

==== Loan to Cagliari ====
On 1 February 2021, Rugani joined Cagliari on a six-month loan. On 3 March, Rugani scored his first goal for the club, in a home league match against Bologna that ended 1–0.

==== Loan to Ajax ====
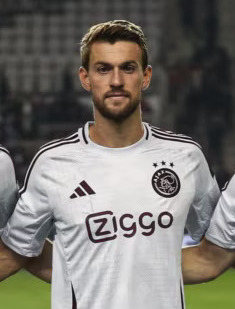
Rugani with Ajax in 2024

On 21 August 2024, Rugani joined Ajax on a season-long loan from Juventus. He made his debut for the club on 18 September, coming on as a substitute in a 5–0 Eredivisie win against Fortuna Sittard. Throughout the 2024–25 season, Rugani featured in 26 matches across all competitions.

Rugani's loan deal expired in June 2025, with no permanent transfer option included.

==== Loan to Fiorentina ====
On 2 February 2026, Rugani was loaned to Fiorentina for the remainder of the 2025–26 season, with an obligation to buy if certain conditions were met.

== International career ==
Rugani has represented Italy at various youth levels since 2010. His first cap for the under-21 team came on 5 March 2014 in a European qualifier against Northern Ireland, in which he scored the first goal for the azzurini in a 2–0 victory.

On 9 November 2014, he was called up by Antonio Conte to the senior Italy squad ahead of a UEFA Euro 2016 qualifying match against Croatia and a friendly against Albania. With the Italy U-21 he took part at the 2015 UEFA European Under-21 Championship under manager Luigi Di Biagio.

On 31 May 2016, Rugani was named one of three reserves for Antonio Conte's senior side for Euro 2016.

Rugani made his senior international debut on 1 September 2016, with newly appointed coach Gian Piero Ventura, coming on as a substitute in a 3–1 friendly defeat to France.

In June 2017, he was included in the Italy under-21 squad for the 2017 UEFA European Under-21 Championship by manager Di Biagio. Italy were eliminated in the semifinals following a 3–1 defeat to Spain on 27 June.

== Style of play ==
Rugani is a tall, tactically versatile, and physically strong centre-back, who is good in the air, both defensively and offensively. He is known in particular for his anticipation, intelligence, and marking ability, despite his lack of notable pace or mobility. He is also considered to be a correct player, who often avoids committing to challenges, preferring to restrict his opponents through his positioning. Due to his confidence in possession, he is capable of playing the ball out from the back-line. Regarded as one of the most promising young Italian players of his generation, in 2015, he was named one of the best players in the world born after 1994, by Don Balón.

== Personal life ==
Rugani has been in a relationship with Italian journalist Michela Persico since 2015; the couple have a son together born in September 2020.

On 11 March 2020, it was announced that Rugani tested positive for COVID-19, while being asymptomatic, amid its pandemic in Italy. He became the first reported player in Serie A to have tested positive for COVID-19.

== Career statistics ==
=== Club ===
As of match played 22 May 2026

Appearances and goals by club, season and competition
Club	Season	League			National cup (Note: Includes Coppa Italia, KNVB Cup)		Europe		Other		Total	
Club	Season	Division	Apps	Goals	Apps	Goals	Apps	Goals	Apps	Goals	Apps	Goals
Empoli (loan)	2013–14	Serie B	40	2	2	0	—		—		42	2
Empoli (loan)	2014–15	Serie A	38	3	1	0	—		—		39	3
Empoli (loan)	Total		78	5	3	0	—		—		81	5
Juventus	2015–16	Serie A	17	0	3	0	1 (Note: Appearance(s) in UEFA Champions League)	0	0	0	21	0
Juventus	2016–17	Serie A	15	2	2	0	2	1	1 (Note: Appearance in Supercoppa Italiana)	0	20	3
Juventus	2017–18	Serie A	22	2	2	0	2	0	0	0	26	2
Juventus	2018–19	Serie A	15	2	1	0	4	0	0	0	20	2
Juventus	2019–20	Serie A	10	0	2	0	2	0	0	0	14	0
Juventus	2021–22	Serie A	12	0	1	1	4	0	1	0	18	1
Juventus	2022–23	Serie A	9	0	1	0	1	0	—		11	0
Juventus	2023–24	Serie A	17	2	1	1	—		—		18	3
Juventus	2024–25	Serie A	—		—		—		1 (Note: Appearance in FIFA Club World Cup)	0	1	0
Juventus	2025–26	Serie A	6	0	0	0	2	0	—		8	0
Juventus	Total		123	8	13	2	18	1	3	0	157	11
Rennes (loan)	2020–21	Ligue 1	1	0	—		1	0	—		2	0
Cagliari (loan)	2020–21	Serie A	16	1	—		—		—		16	1
Ajax (loan)	2024–25	Eredivisie	15	0	2	1	9 (Note: Appearances in UEFA Europa League)	0	—		26	1
Fiorentina (loan)	2025–26	Serie A	6	0	—		0	0	—		6	0
Career total			239	14	18	3	28	1	3	0	288	18

=== International ===
As of 4 June 2018

National team	Year	Apps	Goals
Italy	2016	2	0
Italy	2017	2	0
Italy	2018	3	0
Total		7	0

== Honours ==
Juventus

- Serie A: 2015–16, 2016–17, 2017–18, 2018–19, 2019–20
- Coppa Italia: 2015–16, 2016–17, 2017–18, 2023–24
- Supercoppa Italiana: 2015, 2018
- UEFA Champions League runner-up: 2016–17

Individual

- Serie B Footballer of the Year: 2014
- Serie A Team of the Year: 2014–15
