= Luca Clemenza =

Italian footballer (born 1997)

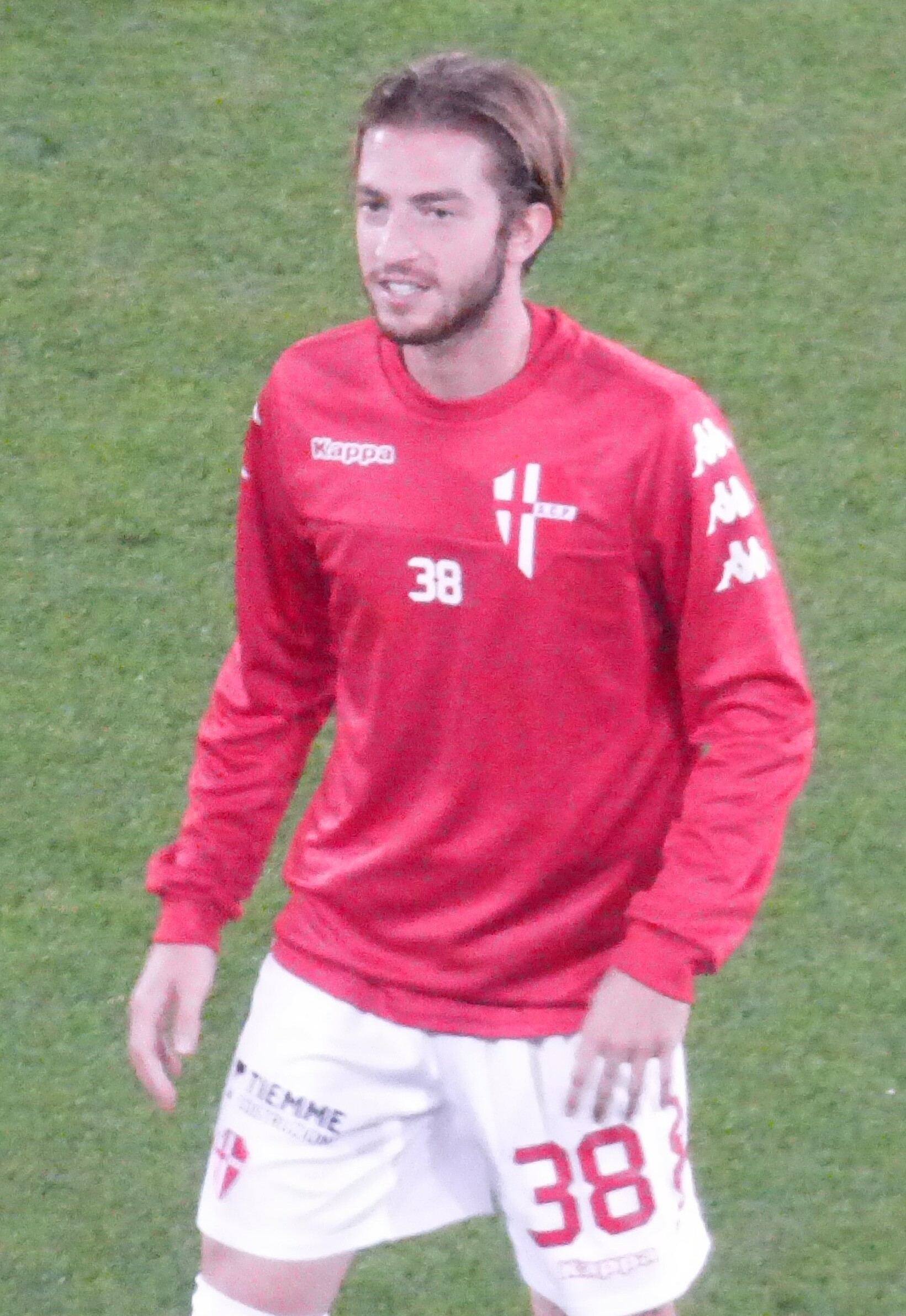
- Clemenza with Padova in 2018

Personal information
- Date of birth: 9 July 1997 (age 29)
- Place of birth: Cittiglio, Italy
- Height: 1.77 m (5 ft 10 in)
- Position: Midfielder

Team information
- Current team: Dolomiti Bellunesi
- Number: 10

Youth career
- Crespadoro
- Arzignano
- Montecchio Maggiore
- –2011: Vicenza
- 2011–2017: Juventus

Senior career*
Years	Team	Apps	(Gls)
2017–2022	Juventus	0	(0)
2017–2018	→ Ascoli (loan)	28	(2)
2018–2019	→ Padova (loan)	22	(2)
2019–2020	→ Juventus U23 (res.)	19	(2)
2020	→ Pescara (loan)	14	(1)
2020–2021	→ Sion (loan)	14	(1)
2021	→ Juventus U23 (res.)	0	(0)
2021–2022	→ Pescara (loan)	35	(7)
2022	Pescara	0	(0)
2022–2024	Virtus Entella	13	(1)
2024–2025	Sestri Levante	47	(8)
2025–	Dolomiti Bellunesi	37	(11)

International career
2012	Italy U16	2	(0)
2013	Italy U17	2	(0)
2018	Italy U20	2	(0)
- * Club domestic league appearances and goals as of 30 April 2026

Luca Clemenza (born 9 July 1997) is an Italian professional footballer who plays as a midfielder for Dolomiti Bellunesi

== Club career ==
=== Juventus ===
==== Loan to Ascoli ====
On 11 August 2017, Clemenza was loaned to Serie B club Ascoli on a season-long loan deal. On 26 August he made his Serie B debut for Ascoli as a substitute replacing Gianmarco De Feo in the 62nd minute of a 3–2 away defeat against Cittadella. On 3 September, Clemenza played his first match as a starter, a 1–0 home win over Pro Vercelli, he was replaced by Enrico Baldini in the 59th minute. On 21 October he played his first entire match for Ascoli, a 1–1 away draw against Ternana. On 9 December, Clemenza scored his first professional goal in the third minute of a 1–1 home draw against Virtus Entella. On 24 February 2018 he scored his second goal in the 51st minute of a 2–1 home win over Cesena. Clemenza ended his loan to Ascoli with 30 appearances, 2 goals and 7 assists.

==== Loan to Padova ====
On 17 August 2018, Clemenza was signed by Serie B side Padova on a season-long loan deal. On 27 August he made his debut for Padova in a 1–1 away draw against Hellas Verona, he was replaced by Jérémie Broh in the 89th minute. One week later, on 1 September he played his first entire match for Padova, a 1–0 home win over Venezia. On 23 September he scored his first goal for Padova in the 26th minute of a 1–1 home draw against Cremonese. On 30 December he scored his second goal for the club in the 47th minute of a 1–1 away draw against Livorno. Clemenza ended his season-long loan to Padova with 22 appearances, 2 goals and 2 assists.

==== Loan to Pescara ====
On 31 January 2020, he joined Serie B club Pescara on loan.

==== Loan to Sion ====
On 12 October 2020, Clemenza signed to Swiss club Sion. Upon his return from Sion he was assigned to Juventus U23 for the 2021–22 season.

==== Second loan to Pescara ====
On 31 August 2021, he returned to Pescara on another loan, with the club now in Serie C. On 12 July 2022, Pescara bought him.

=== Virtus Entella ===
On the same day, Pescara re-sold his rights to Virtus Entella in Serie C, with Facundo Lescano moving in the opposite direction as part of the transfer.

== International career ==
Clemenza represented Italy at Under-16, Under-17 and Under-20 level. On 4 September 2012 he made his debut at U-16 level as a substitute replacing Valerio Trani in the 41st minute of a 3–1 away defeat against Switzerland U-16. On 30 August 2013 he made his debut at U-17 level as a substitute replacing Giuseppe Panico in the 57th minute of a 1–0 home defeat against Portugal U-17. On 22 March 2018, Clemenza made his debut at U-20 level in a 1–0 away defeat against Czech Republic U-20, he was replaced by Ferdinando Del Sole in the 84th minute.

== Career statistics ==
=== Club ===
As of 23 November 2019

Club	Season	League			Cup		Europe		Other		Total	
Club	Season	League	Apps	Goals	Apps	Goals	Apps	Goals	Apps	Goals	Apps	Goals
Ascoli (loan)	2017–18	Serie B	28	2	0	0	—		2 (Note: Appearance(s) in Serie B play-out.)	0	30	2
Padova (loan)	2018–19	Serie B	22	2	0	0	—		—		22	2
Juventus U23	2019–20	Serie C	12	1	2	0	—		—		14	1
Career total			62	5	2	0	—		2	0	66	5

== Honours ==
Juventus Primavera

- Torneo di Viareggio: 2016
