= Carlo Pinsoglio =

Italian footballer (born 1990)

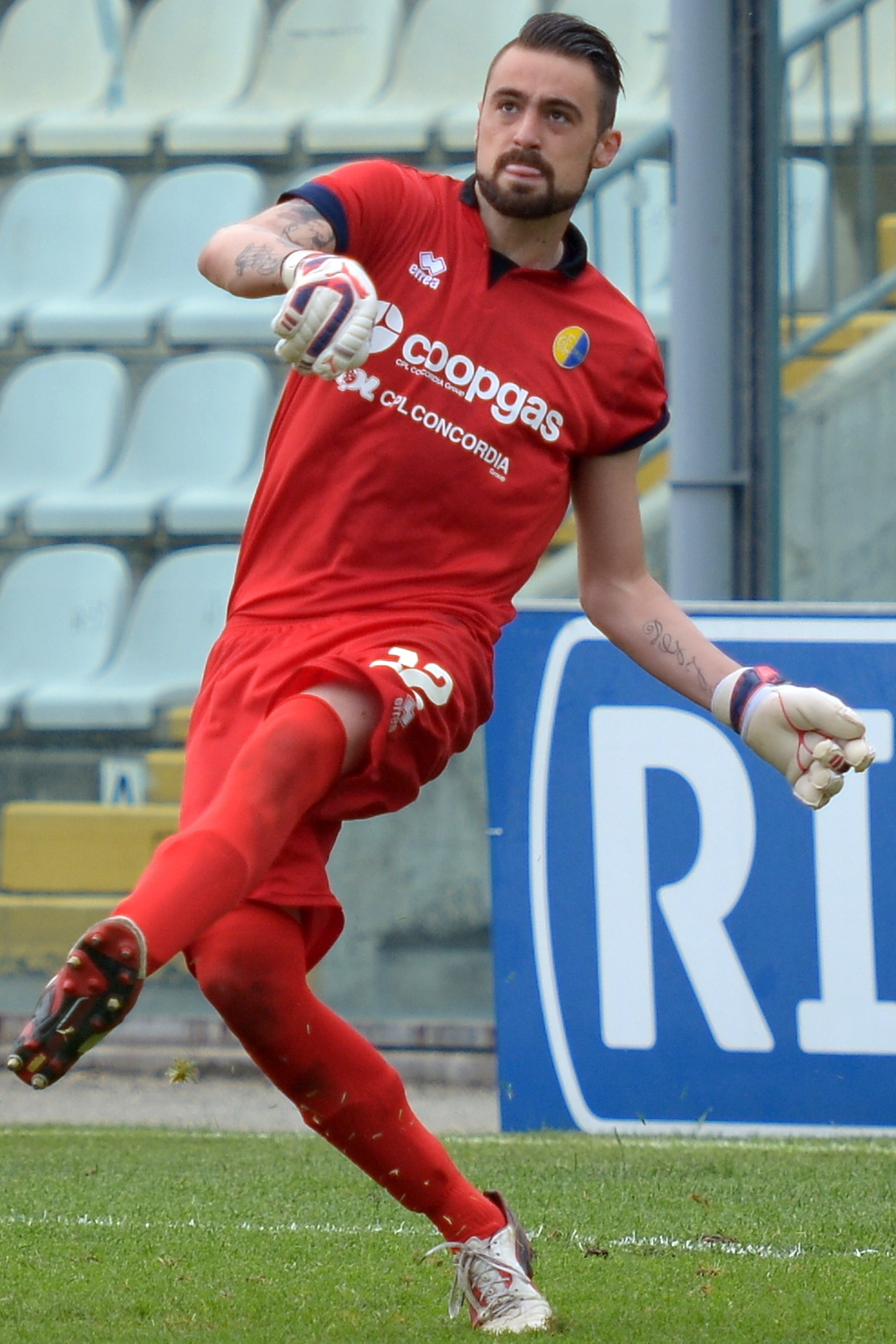
- Pinsoglio with Modena in 2015

Personal information
- Full name: Carlo Pinsoglio
- Date of birth: 16 March 1990 (age 36)
- Place of birth: Moncalieri, Italy
- Height: 1.92 m (6 ft 4 in)
- Position: Goalkeeper

Team information
- Current team: Juventus
- Number: 23

Youth career
- 2000–2010: Juventus

Senior career*
Years	Team	Apps	(Gls)
2010–2012	Juventus	0	(0)
2010–2011	→ Viareggio (loan)	25	(0)
2011–2012	→ Pescara (loan)	5	(0)
2012–2014	Vicenza	23	(0)
2013–2014	→ Modena (loan)	44	(0)
2014–	Juventus	9	(0)
2014–2015	→ Modena (loan)	40	(0)
2015–2016	→ Livorno (loan)	38	(0)
2016–2017	→ Latina (loan)	41	(0)

International career
2009–2010	Italy U20	2	(0)
2011–2012	Italy U21	9	(0)
- * Club domestic league appearances and goals as of 23:56, 25 May 2024 (UTC)

Carlo Pinsoglio (born 16 March 1990) is an Italian professional footballer who plays as a goalkeeper for Serie A club Juventus.

== Club career ==
=== Juventus ===
Pinsoglio began his career with Italian giants Juventus and after working his way up the youth ranks at the club, he was promoted to the Primavera youth squad in 2007. Pinsoglio had been the starting goalkeeper since 2008 until his youth team graduation at the conclusion of the 2009–10 season. Upon his promotion to the Juventus first team, Pinsoglio was sent out on loan to Lega Pro Prima Divisione side, F.C. Esperia Viareggio, where he became the club's starting goalkeeper. Coincidentally, fellow Juventus product, Giorgio Merlano served as his back-up. Pinsoglio went on to make 25 league appearances for the club in his first professional season and he returned to Turin on 30 June 2011. Once he returned to Juventus, Pinsoglio was again sent out on loan. In July 2011, he joined Serie B club Pescara along with Ciro Immobile. On 10 September 2011, he made his debut as the first choice goalkeeper in the home match won 2–0 against Crotone. In the first half of the 2011–12 Serie B season, he served mostly as a backup to veteran Luca Anania, making just five league appearances. In January 2012, Pinsoglio was recalled by Juventus, who then went on to sell the player in a co-ownership deal to fellow Serie B side, Vicenza Calcio.

=== Vicenza ===
Pinsoglio officially completed his switch to Vicenza in January 2012, as part of the deal of Fausto Rossi, Pinsoglio's 50% registration rights was valued €1.5 million and Rossi for €1.7 million. Again, Pinsoglio was mostly deployed as a back-up goalkeeper. He became the club's second choice, playing behind Alberto Frison, and ahead of veteran Paolo Acerbis. He made three league appearances in his first five months with the club, which ultimately ended in relegation from Serie B to the Lega Pro Prima Divisione following a play-out loss on aggregate to Empoli. The club was, however, reinstated in Serie B, thanks to the enforced relegation on U.S. Lecce due to their involvement in the 2011 Italian football betting scandal. He began the 2012–13 Serie B season as the club's first choice goalkeeper, following the sale of Frison to Calcio Catania. Pinsoglio made 20 league appearances before losing his place to January 2013 arrival Nicolas Bremec. Vicenza were relegated at the end of the season and will thus take part in the 2013–14 Lega Pro Prima Divisione.

On 20 June 2013, the co-ownership between Vicenza and Juventus of Niko Bianconi, Luca Castiglia and Pinsoglio were renewed with the registration rights of Castiglia and Pinsoglio remaining with the Lega Pro side.

==== Modena (loan) ====
On 23 July 2013, Pinsoglio was sent on loan from Vicenza to Serie B side, Modena in exchange for the full registration rights of Angelo Di Stasio.

=== Juventus return ===
On 20 June 2014, Juventus announced that they had secured full ownership of Pinsoglio's contract for €700,000, with Bianconi returned to Vicenza for €600,000, Pinsoglio signed a three-year contract.

==== Modena (loan) ====
On 4 July 2014, Pinsoglio returned to Modena on a second season-long loan deal ahead of the 2014–15 Serie B season.

==== Livorno (loan) ====
On 3 August 2015, Pinsoglio signed for A.S. Livorno Calcio, replacing Luca Mazzoni. In an important relegation clash against Virtus Lanciano, after Mazzoni gave away a penalty and was shown a red card, Pinsoglio replaced him and sealed the two-goal come back of Virtus Lanciano fumbling a cross at the feet on an opposing striker.

==== Latina (loan) ====
In July 2016 Pinsoglio and Pol Garcia were loaned to U.S. Latina Calcio from Juventus.

==== Juventus debut ====
On 19 May 2018, in the last match of the season, Pinsoglio made his Serie A and Juventus debut, coming on in the 64th minute of an eventual 2–1 home win against Hellas Verona to replace the club's starting goalkeeper, Gianluigi Buffon; Pinsoglio was beaten by Alessio Cerci in the 76th minute. The club celebrated winning the league title and a domestic double after the match.

On 27 September 2018, Pinsoglio signed a two-year contract extension with Juventus, which would keep him at the club until June 2020.

On 1 August 2020, he featured as a substitute for Wojciech Szczęsny in Juventus's 3–1 defeat to Roma in Serie A, with his club already confirmed as league champions.

In June 2021, Pinsoglio signed a new deal with Juventus, keeping him at the club until 2023. It has been noted that a big part of his renewal is due to his positive influence in the dressing room. In May 2023, Juventus extended Pinsoglio's contract again, this time, until the end of the 2024–25 season. On 26 February 2026, Pinsoglio signed a one and a half year contract with the club.

== International career ==
Pinsoglio has represented Italy at the U20 level. On 8 February 2011 he made his debut with the Italy U21 squad in a friendly game against England played in Empoli. He represented the U21 side on eight additional occasions (three in the 2013 UEFA European Under-21 Football Championship qualification), though he was not called up by new coach Devis Mangia ahead of the 2013 UEFA European Under-21 Football Championship.

== Career statistics ==
As of match played 28 May 2024

Appearances and goals by club, season and competition
Club	Season	League			Cup		Continental		Other		Total	
Club	Season	Division	Apps	Goals	Apps	Goals	Apps	Goals	Apps	Goals	Apps	Goals
Juventus	2008–09	Serie A	0	0	—		—		—		0	0
Juventus	2009–10	Serie A	0	0	—		0	0	—		0	0
Juventus	Total		0	0	—		0	0	—		0	0
Viareggio (loan)	2010–11	Serie C	27	0	—		—		—		27	0
Pescara (loan)	2011–12	Serie B	5	0	1	0	—		—		6	0
Vicenza	2011–12	Serie B	3	0	—		—		—		3	0
Vicenza	2012–13	Serie B	20	0	3	0	—		—		23	0
Vicenza	Total		23	0	3	0	—		—		26	0
Modena (loan)	2013–14	Serie B	39	0	0	0	—		—		39	0
Modena (loan)	2014–15	Serie B	42	0	2	0	—		—		44	0
Modena (loan)	Total		81	0	2	0	—		—		83	0
Livorno (loan)	2015–16	Serie B	36	0	2	0	—		—		38	0
Latina (loan)	2016–17	Serie B	39	0	2	0	—		—		41	0
Juventus	2017–18	Serie A	1	0	0	0	0	0	2 (Note: Appearance(s) in International Champions Cup)	0	3	0
Juventus	2018–19	Serie A	1	0	0	0	0	0	1	0	2	0
Juventus	2019–20	Serie A	1	0	0	0	0	0	0	0	1	0
Juventus	2020–21	Serie A	1	0	0	0	0	0	0	0	1	0
Juventus	2021–22	Serie A	1	0	0	0	0	0	0	0	1	0
Juventus	2022–23	Serie A	0	0	0	0	0	0	—		0	0
Juventus	2023–24	Serie A	1	0	0	0	—		—		1	0
Juventus	2024–25	Serie A	0	0	0	0	0	0	0	0	0	0
Juventus	2025–26	Serie A	0	0	0	0	0	0	—		0	0
Juventus	Total		6	0	0	0	0	0	3	0	9	0
Career Total			216	0	10	0	0	0	3	0	229	0

== Honours ==
Juventus

- Serie A: 2017–18, 2018–19, 2019–20
- Coppa Italia: 2017–18, 2020–21, 2023–24
- Supercoppa Italiana: 2018, 2020
