= List of Italian football transfers summer 2008 (July) =

This is a list of Italian football transfers, for the 2008–09 season, from and to Serie A and Serie B.

In July 2008 FIGC announced each Serie A clubs could signed up to 2 non-EU player to replace their old non-EU player who moved abroad, released or retired. These transfer were marked.

== Summer transfer window ==
| Date | Name | Nat | Moving from | Moving to | Fee |
|---|---|---|---|---|---|
| 16 January 2008^{1} | Jaime Valdés | Chile | Lecce | Atalanta | Free |
| 17 January 2008^{1} | Túlio de Melo | Brazil | (France) Le Mans | Palermo | Free / €3.8M (Third Parties ownership) |
| 24 January 2008^{1} | Olof Mellberg | Sweden | (England) Aston Villa | Juventus | Free |
| 2008-02-07^{1} | Julián Di Cosmo | Argentina | Igea Virtus | Catania | Undisclosed |
| 2008-02-16^{1} | Simon Kjær | Denmark | (Denmark) Midtjylland | Palermo | €4M |
| 2008-02-27^{1} | Tomáš Košický | Slovakia | (Slovakia) Inter Bratislava | Catania | Undisclosed |
| 2008-03-11^{1} | Mijat Marić | Switzerland | (Switzerland) St. Gallen | Bari | Free |
| 2008-03-29 | Kris Stadsgaard | Denmark | Reggina | (Norway) Rosenborg | Undisclosed |
| 2008-04-02^{1} | Antonino Bonvissuto | Italy | Lanciano | Bari | Undisclosed |
| 2008-05-05^{1} | Mathieu Flamini | France | (England) Arsenal | Milan | Free |
| 2008-05-05 | Daniel Bradaschia | Italy | Treviso (youth) | Udinese | Free |
| 2008-05-07 | McDonald Mariga | Kenya | (Sweden) Helsingborg | Parma | Undisclosed |
| 2008-05-14^{1} | Antonio Langella | Italy | Atalanta | Udinese | Free |
| 2008-05-15 | Matteo Alberti | Italy | Chievo | (England) QPR | Undisclosed |
| 2008-05-15 | Piergiuseppe Maritato | Italy | Juventus (youth) | Fiorentina (youth) | Free |
| 2008-05-24 | Albin Ekdal | Sweden | (Sweden) Brommapojkarna | Juventus | €0.6M + bonus |
| 2008-05-25 | Ricardo Oliveira | Brazil | Milan | (Spain) Zaragoza | €10M |
| 2008-05-27 | Frank Feltscher | Switzerland | (Switzerland) Grasshopper | Lecce | Undisclosed |
| 2008-05-28 | Andrea Raggi | Italy | Empoli | Palermo | €7M |
| 2008-05-28 | Alberto Gilardino | Italy | Milan | Fiorentina | €15M |
| 2008-05-28 | Fabrizio Cacciatore | Italy | Sampdoria | Triestina | Loan |
| 2008-05-30 | Antonio Cassano | Italy | (Spain) Real Madrid | Sampdoria | Free + bonus |
| 2008-05-30 | Fabio Liverani | Italy | Fiorentina | Palermo | Free |
| 2008-05-30 | Amauri | Brazil | Palermo | Juventus | €22.8M |
| 2008-05-30 | Antonio Nocerino | Italy | Juventus | Palermo | €7.5M |
| 2008-05-31 | Tomáš Sivok | Czech Republic | Udinese | (Turkey) Beşiktaş | €4.7M |
| 2008-05-31 | Gianluca Zambrotta | Italy | (Spain) Barcelona | Milan | €9M + Bonus (€2M max.) |
| 2008-06-02 | Felipe Melo | Brazil | (Spain) Almería | Fiorentina | Undisclosed |
| 2008-06-04 | Leandro Rinaudo | Italy | Palermo | Napoli | €5.5M |
| 2008-06-04 | Davide Di Gennaro | Italy | Milan | Genoa | Co-ownership, €2.5M (Part of Borriello's deal) |
| 2008-06-05 | Stevan Jovetić | Montenegro | (Serbia) Partizan | Fiorentina | Undisclosed |
| 2008-06-05 | Marco Amelia | Italy | Livorno | Palermo | €6M |
| 2008-06-05 | Yoann Gourcuff | France | Milan | (France) Bordeaux | Loan |
| 6 June 2008 | Mateo Figoli | Uruguay | (Uruguay) Danubio | Triestina | Free / €1.2M third parties ownership |
| 2008-06-07 | Ezequiel Carboni | Argentina | (Austria) Red Bull Salzburg | Catania | Undisclosed |
| 2008-06-09 | Luca Antonelli | Italy | Milan | Parma | Co-ownership, €0.75M |
| 2008-06-10 | Paolo Facchinetti | Italy | Genoa | Pergocrema | Loan |
| 2008-06-10 | Gaetano Calà | Italy | Messina | Udinese | Undisclosed |
| 2008-06-10 | Sergio Volpi | Italy | Sampdoria | Bologna | Free |
| 2008-06-10 | Fabio Pecchia | Italy | Frosinone | Foggia | Free |
| 2008-06-11 | Christian Maggio | Italy | Sampdoria | Napoli | €8M |
| 2008-06-12 | Cristian Zaccardo | Italy | Palermo | (Germany) Wolfsburg | €7M |
| 2008-06-12 | Andrea Barzagli | Italy | Palermo | (Germany) Wolfsburg | €12.95M |
| 2008-06-12 | Nicola Ascoli | Italy | Empoli | Frosinone | Undisclosed |
| 2008-06-12 | Sandro Porchia | Italy | Rimini | Grosseto | Undisclosed |
| 2008-06-13 | Alessandro Budel | Italy | Empoli | Parma | Free |
| 2008-06-14 | Nikola Gulan | Serbia | Sampdoria | Fiorentina | Undisclosed |
| 2008-06-15 | Marco Bernacci | Italy | Ascoli | Bologna | Undisclosed |
| 2008-06-16 | Ferdinando Coppola | Italy | Milan | Atalanta | Co-ownership, €0.75M |
| 2008-06-17 | Mirko Delìa | Italy | Francavilla (amateur) | Catania | Undisclosed |
| 2008-06-18 | John Arne Riise | Norway | (England) Liverpool | Roma | €5M + bonus (€0.5M max.) |
| 2008-06-18 | Daniele De Vezze | Italy | Livorno | Bari | Undisclosed |
| 2008-06-19 | Giuseppe Biava | Italy | Palermo | Genoa | €0.5M |
| 2008-06-19 | Salvatore Bocchetti | Italy | Frosinone | Genoa | Co-ownership, €2.3M |
| 2008-06-20 | Federico Marchetti | Italy | AlbinoLeffe | Cagliari | Loan |
| 2008-06-20 | Kwadwo Asamoah | Ghana | (Switzerland) Bellinzona | Udinese | Loan |
| 2008-06-20 | Abdoulay Konko | France | Genoa | (Spain) Sevilla | Undisclosed |
| 2008-06-22 | Francesco Flachi | Italy | Unattached | Empoli | Free |
| 2008-06-23 | Andrea Masiello | Italy | Genoa | Bari | Co-ownership, €1.5M |
| 2008-06-24 | Matteo Camillini | Italy | Bellaria | Ascoli | Undisclosed |
| 2008-06-24 | Mirko Valdifiori | Italy | Cesena | Empoli | Co-ownership, Undisclosed |
| 2008-06-24 | Abdelkader Ghezzal | Algeria | Crotone | Genoa | €2M |
| 2008-06-24 | Riccardo Bolzan | Italy | Chievo | Monza | Loan |
| 2008-06-25 | Rosario Bucolo | Italy | Catania | Reggiana | Co-ownership, Undisclosed |
| 2008-06-25 | Vito Falconieri | Italy | Catania | Reggiana | Loan |
| 2008-06-25 | Cristiano Camillucci | Italy | Sangiovannese | Ancona | Undisclosed |
| 2008-06-25 | Filippo Mattiuzzo | Italy | Parma | Carpenedolo | Loan |
| 2008-06-25 | Matteo Lanzoni | Italy | Sampdoria | Bari | Loan |
| 2008-06-25^{1} | Simone Loria | Italy | Siena | Roma | €2.8M |
| 2008-06-25^{1} | Ahmed Barusso | Ghana | Roma (& Rimini) | Siena | Loan |
| 2008-06-25^{1} | Gianluca Curci | Italy | Roma | Siena | Co-ownership, €1.75M |
| 2008-06-25^{1} | Artur | Brazil | Siena | Roma | €0.75M |
| 2008-06-25^{1} | Daniele Magliocchetti | Italy | Roma | Cagliari | Co-ownership, €500 |
| 2008-06-25 | Nicholas Frey | France | Modena | Chievo | Co-ownership, Undisclosed |
| 2008-06-25 | Angelo Antonazzo | Italy | Modena | Chievo | Undisclosed |
| 25 June 2008 | Marco Sau | Italy | Cagliari | AlbinoLeffe | Loan |
| 2008-06-25 | Michele Paolucci | Italy | Udinese (co-owned with Juventus) | Catania | Loan |
| 25 June 2008 | Valerio Di Cesare | Italy | Mantova | Vicenza | €1M (swap with Marchesetti) |
| 25 June 2008 | Simone Calori | Italy | Mantova | Vicenza | €500,000 (swap with Fissore) |
| 25 June 2008 | Riccardo Fissore | Italy | Vicenza | Mantova | €500,000 (swap with Calori) |
| 25 June 2008 | Mattia Marchesetti | Italy | Vicenza | Mantova | €1M (swap with Di Cesare) |
| 2008-06-25 | Moris Carrozzieri | Italy | Atalanta | Palermo | €3.4M |
| 25 June 2008 | Marco Pisano | Italy | Palermo | Torino | €1.5M |
| 25 June 2008 | Andrea Catellani | Italy | Reggiana | Catania | Co-ownership, Undisclosed |
| 25 June 2008 | Fernando Forestieri | Italy | Genoa | Siena | Loan |
| 25 June 2008 | Manuel Coppola | Italy | Genoa | Siena | Co-ownership, €1.5M |
| 25 June 2008 | Alessandro Di Maio | Italy | Genoa | Lucchese | Loan |
| 25 June 2008 | Giacomo Cotellessa | Italy | Genoa | Lucchese | Loan |
| 2008-06-26 | Paolo Pincio | Italy | Fiorentina (youth) | Campobasso (youth) | Loan |
| 2008-06-26 | Erminio Rullo | Italy | Napoli | Triestina | Loan |
| 26 June 2008 | Massimo Coda | Italy | Treviso | Bologna | Co-ownership, €1.05M |
| 2008-06-26 | Sergio Viotti | Italy | Brescia | Bellaria | Loan |
| 2008-06-26 | Gianmarco Conti | Italy | Venezia (youth) | Milan (youth) | Co-ownership, €200,000 |
| 2008-06-27 | Emmanuel Ledesma | Argentina | Genoa | (England) QPR | Loan |
| 2008-06-27 | Riccardo Maniero | Italy | Juventus | Bari | Loan |
| 2008-06-27 | Raffaele Bianco | Italy | Juventus | Bari | Loan |
| 2008-06-27 | Germán Denis | Argentina | (Argentina) Independiente | Napoli | €7.7M |
| 2008-06-28 | Simone Bonomi | Italy | Crotone | Bari | Undisclosed |
| 2008-06-28 | Nicolae Dică | Romania | (Romania) Steaua Bucharest | Catania | Undisclosed |
| 2008-06-30 | Rodrigue Boisfer | France | Genoa | Pro Sesto | Loan |
| 2008-06-30 | Pablo Ledesma | Argentina | (Argentina) Boca Juniors | Catania | Undisclosed |
| 2008-06-30 | Gianluca Sansone | Italy | Valle del Giovenco | Siena | Undisclosed |
| 2008-06-30 | Dario Knežević | Croatia | Livorno | Juventus | Loan |
| 2008-06-30 | Christian Vieri | Italy | Fiorentina | Atalanta | Free |
| 30 June 2008 | Stefano Mondini | Italy | Mantova | Cesena | Co-ownership, €750,000 (swap with Jidayi) |
| 30 June 2008 | Christian Jidayi | Italy | Cesena | Mantova | Co-ownership, €750,000 (swap with Mondini) |
| 30 June 2008 | Cristian Cristea | Romania | Cesena (youth) | Triestina | Co-ownership, €225,000 (part of Chiavarini) |
| 30 June 2008 | Franco Chiavarini | Argentina | Triestina | Cesena | Co-ownership, €275,000 (Cristea + €50,000 cash) |
| 2008-07-01 | Stefano Garzon | Italy | Chievo | Verona | Co-ownership, undisclosed |
| 2008-07-01 | Pellegrino Albanese | Italy | Anastasio Salvatore | Internazionale (youth) | Undisclosed |
| 2008-07-01 | Mirko Guadalupi | Italy | Perugia | Siena | Undisclosed |
| 2008-07-01 | Tomáš Zápotočný | Czech Republic | Udinese | (Turkey) Beşiktaş | €4.5M |
| 2008-07-01 | Alessio Sestu | Italy | Treviso | Avellino | Co-ownership, Undisclosed |
| 2008-07-01 | Victor Obinna | Nigeria | Chievo | Internazionale | Undisclosed |
| 2008-07-01 | Tomáš Ujfaluši | Czech Republic | Fiorentina | (Spain) Atlético Madrid | Free |
| 2008-07-01 | Roberto Sosa | Argentina | Napoli | (Argentina) Gimnasia (LP) | Free |
| 2008-07-01 | Davide Lanzafame | Italy | Juventus | Palermo | Co-ownership, €2.5M (Part of Amauri's deal) |
| 2008-07-01 | Samuel Di Carmine | Italy | Fiorentina | (England) QPR | Loan |
| 2008-07-01 | Ricardo Verón | Argentina | Siena | (Greece) PAOK | Undisclosed |
| 2008-07-01 | Gabriele Puccio | Italy | Internazionale | Verona | Loan |
| 2008-07-01 | Rej Volpato | Italy | Juventus | Bari | Co-ownership, €0.5M |
| 2008-07-01 | Alessandro Potenza | Italy | Fiorentina | Genoa | Undisclosed |
| 2008-07-01 | György Garics | Austria | Napoli | Atalanta | Co-ownership, €1.5M |
| 2008-07-01 | Emanuele Calaiò | Italy | Napoli | Siena | Co-ownership, €2.3M |
| 2008-07-01 | Cristian Zenoni | Italy | Sampdoria | Bologna | Undisclosed |
| 2008-07-01 | Gonçalo Brandão | Portugal | (Portugal) Belenenses | Siena | Undisclosed |
| 2008-07-01 | Abdelkader Ghezzal | Algeria | Genoa | Siena | €3.5M |
| 2008-07-01 | Romano Perticone | Italy | Milan | Livorno | Co-ownership, €0.6M |
| 2008-07-02 | Diego Albadoro | Italy | Giugliano | Bari (youth) | Undisclosed |
| 2008-07-02 | Michele Rinaldi | Italy | Atalanta | Rimini | Co-ownership, Undisclosed |
| 2008-07-02 | Francesco Scardina | Italy | Vicenza | Chievo | Free |
| 2008-07-02 | Giandomenico Mesto | Italy | Reggina | Genoa | Co-ownership, €3.5M (cash plus Santos) |
| 2008-07-02 | Francesco Modesto | Italy | Reggina | Genoa | €5.173M (including agent fee) |
| 2008-07-02 | Emanuele D'Anna | Italy | Pisa | Chievo | Undisclosed |
| 2008-07-03 | Marcos de Paula | Brazil | Chievo | Foligno | Loan |
| 2008-07-03 | Angelo Antonazzo | Italy | Chievo | Frosinone | Co-ownership, Undisclosed |
| 2008-07-03 | Raffaele Palladino | Italy | Juventus | Genoa | Co-ownership, €5M |
| 2008-07-03 | Marco Gorzegno | Italy | Spezia | Brescia | Undisclosed |
| 2008-07-03 | Omar el Kaddouri | Belgium | (Belgium) Anderlecht | Brescia | Undisclosed |
| 2008-07-03 | André Cuneaz | Italy | Juventus | Mantova | Co-ownership, Undisclosed |
| 2008-07-03 | Ivan Castiglia | Italy | Reggina | Cittadella | Loan |
| 2008-07-03 | Fabio Giordano | Italy | Foggia | Cittadella | Undisclosed |
| 2008-07-03 | Paolo Rossi | Italy | Monza | Cittadella | Undisclosed |
| 2008-07-03 | Marius Stankevičius | Lithuania | Brescia | Sampdoria | €3M |
| 3 July 2008 | Juanito Gómez Taleb | Argentina | Triestina | Verona | Co-ownership, €80,000 |
| 3 July 2008 | Ivan Loseto | Italy | Bari | Verona | Loan |
| 2008-07-03 | Oussama Essabr | Morocco | Juventus | Vicenza | Loan |
| 2008-07-03 | Giuseppe Rizza | Italy | Juventus | Livorno | Co-ownership, Undisclosed |
| 2008-07-04 | Davide Facchin | Italy | Milan | Padova | Loan |
| 2008-07-04 | Andrea Dossena | Italy | Udinese | (England) Liverpool | Undisclosed |
| 2008-07-04 | Philippe Montandon | Switzerland | (Switzerland) St. Gallen | Chievo | Undisclosed |
| 2008-07-04 | Christian Conti | Italy | Bari | Verona | Loan |
| 2008-07-04 | Franco Da Dalt | Argentina | Triestina | Verona | |
| 2008-07-04 | Philippe Montandon | Switzerland | Chievo | (Switzerland) Lugano | Loan |
| 2008-07-04 | Stefano Sorrentino | Italy | (Greece) AEK Athens | Chievo | Loan |
| 2008-07-05 | Dario Campagna | Italy | Juventus (youth) | Verona | Loan |
| 2008-07-05 | Luisito Campisi | Italy | Atalanta | Verona | Co-ownership, Undisclosed |
| 2008-07-05 | Gianluca Comotto | Italy | Torino | Fiorentina | Undisclosed |
| 2008-07-05 | Aleandro Rosi | Italy | Roma | Livorno | Loan |
| 2008-07-05 | Daniele Greco | Italy | Lazio | Sorrento | Co-ownership, Undisclosed |
| 2008-07-06 | Nicola Belmonte | Italy | Bari | Siena | Co-ownership, €1.2M |
| 2008-07-07 | Francesco Carbone | Italy | Avellino | Padova | Loan |
| 2008-07-07 | Milan Jirásek | Czech Republic | (Czech Republic) Sparta Prague (youth) | Internazionale (youth) | Undisclosed |
| 2008-07-07 | Tommaso Chiecchi | Italy | Chievo | Lumezzane | Loan |
| 2008-07-07 | Amedeo Calliari | Italy | Chievo | Lumezzane | Loan |
| 2008-07-07 | Donato Di Sabato | Italy | Varese | AlbinoLeffe | Youth, Undisclosed |
| 2008-07-07 | Antonio Candreva | Italy | Udinese | Livorno | Loan |
| 2008-07-07 | Andrea Migliorini | Italy | Udinese | Livorno | Co-ownership, Undisclosed |
| 2008-07-08 | Keivan Zarineh | Iran | Roma | Valle del Giovenco | Loan |
| 2008-07-08 | Andrea Gasbarroni | Italy | Parma | Genoa | €2M |
| 8 July 2008 | Lorenzo Del Prete | Juventus | Siena | Co-ownership, €130,000 | |
| 2008-07-09 | Francesco Renzetti | Italy | Genoa | AlbinoLeffe | Co-ownership, €750,000 |
| 2008-07-09 | Gleison Santos | Italy | AlbinoLeffe | Reggina | €1M |
| 2008-07-09 | Danilo Russo | Italy | Genoa | Pergocrema | Loan |
| 2008-07-09 | Michele Tarallo | Italy | Genoa | Pergocrema | Loan |
| 2008-07-09 | Ivan Fatić | Montenegro | Internazionale (co-owned with Chievo) | Vicenza | Loan |
| 2008-07-09 | Nicholas Giani | Italy | Internazionale | Vicenza | Co-ownership, €500 |
| 2008-07-09 | Dyego Rocha Coelho | Brazil | (Brazil) Corinthians | Bologna | Loan |
| 2008-07-09 | Matteo Lombardo | Italy | Internazionale | Legnano | Co-ownership, €500 |
| 2008-07-09 | Julio César de León | Honduras | Genoa | Parma | €2.9M |
| 10 July 2008 | Thierry Audel | France | Triestina | San Marino | Loan |
| 2008-07-10 | Magnus Troest | Denmark | (Denmark) FC Midtjylland | Parma | Undisclosed |
| 2008-07-10 | Magnus Troest | Denmark | Parma | Genoa (remained in Parma) | Co-ownership, €1.5M |
| 2008-07-10 | Marco Valtulina | Italy | Pro Sesto | Torino | Co-ownership, Undisclosed |
| 2008-07-10 | Marco Valtulina | Italy | Torino | Pro Sesto | Loan |
| 2008-07-10 | Serhiy Predko | Ukraine | Torino | Pro Sesto | Co-ownership, Undisclosed |
| 2008-07-10 | Robert Gucher | Austria | (Austria) GAK | Frosinone | Free |
| 2008-07-10 | Dieter Elsneg | Austria | (Austria) GAK | Frosinone | Free |
| 2008-07-10 | Nunzio Di Roberto | Italy | Foggia | Frosinone | Co-ownership, Undisclosed |
| 2008-07-10 | Massimo Zappino | Brazil | Frosinone | Foggia | Undisclosed |
| 2008-07-10 | Gennaro Troianiello | Italy | Frosinone | Foggia | Loan |
| 2008-07-10 | Nicolas Guidi | Italy | Lucchese | Frosinone | Co-ownership, Undisclosed |
| 2008-07-10 | Gianluca Nocentini | Italy | Lucchese | Frosinone | Co-ownership, Undisclosed |
| 2008-07-10 | Raffaele Ioime | Italy | Catania | Legnano | Loan |
| 2008-07-10 | Marco Parolo | Italy | Chievo | Verona | Co-ownership, Undisclosed |
| 2008-07-10 | Domenico Girardi | Italy | Chievo | Verona | Loan |
| 2008-07-10 | Raffaele Imparato | Italy | Salernitana | Catania | Free |
| 2008-07-10 | Raffaele Imparato | Italy | Catania | Paganese | Loan |
| 2008-07-10 | Simone Masini | Italy | Lucchese | Ascoli | Co-ownership, Undisclosed |
| 2008-07-10 | Marco Gallozzi | Italy | Ascoli (youth) | Gubbio | Co-ownership, Undisclosed |
| 11 July 2008 | Giacomo Di Donato | Italy | Lamezia | Chievo | Undisclosed |
| | Giacomo Di Donato | Italy | Chievo | Lamezia | Loan |
| 11 July 2008 | Federico Groppioni | Italy | Bari | Potenza | Loan |
| 11 July 2008 | Vitangelo Spadavecchia | Italy | Bari | Sorrento | Loan |
| 11 July 2008 | Nicola Strambelli | Italy | Bari | Sorrento | Loan |
| 11 July 2008 | Giuseppe Statella | Italy | Bari (youth) | Benevento | Loan |
| 11 July 2008 | Giacinto Allegrini | Italy | Bari (youth) | Noicattaro | Loan |
| 11 July 2008 | Alessandro Armenise | Italy | Bari | Catanzaro | Loan |
| 2008-07-11 | Eros Corradini | Italy | Parma | Grosseto | Undisclosed |
| 2008-07-11 | Giacomo Cotellessa | Italy | Genoa | Sangiovannese | Co-ownership, €500 |
| 2008-07-11 | Giacomo Zappacosta | Italy | Fiorentina (co-owned with Pescara) | Pro Patria | Loan |
| 2008-07-11 | Italo Mattioli | Italy | Lecce | Foggia | Co-ownership, Undisclosed |
| 2008-07-11 | Marcus Diniz | Brazil | Milan | Livorno | Co-ownership, €0.3M |
| 2008-07-11 | Giorgio Merlano | Italy | Juventus (youth) | Melfi | Loan |
| 2008-07-11 | Tullio Maio | Italy | Juventus (youth) | Melfi | Loan |
| 2008-07-11 | Andrea Ranocchia | Italy | Arezzo | Genoa | Co-ownership, €1.55M |
| 2008-07-11 | Andrea Ranocchia | Italy | Genoa | Bari | Loan |
| 2008-07-11 | Salvatore Aurelio | Italy | Genoa | Crotone | Loan |
| 2008-07-11 | Felice Natalino | Italy | Crotone (youth) | Genoa (youth) | Undisclosed |
| 2008-07-11 | Luis Maria Alfageme | Argentina | Brescia | Lanciano | Loan |
| 2008-07-11 | Marco Viviano | Italy | Roma | Lanciano | Undisclosed |
| 2008-07-11 | Daniele Gasparetto | Italy | Atalanta | Modena | Loan |
| 2008-07-11 | Danilo D'Ambrosio | Italy | Fiorentina | Juve Stabia | Loan |
| 2008-07-11 | Thiago Barbosa | Brazil | Treviso | Juve Stabia | Undisclosed |
| 2008-07-11 | Daniele Cacia | Italy | Piacenza | Lecce | Co-ownership, €3M |
| 2008-07-11 | Imperio Carcione | Italy | Cassino | Salernitana | Undisclosed |
| 2008-07-11 | Fabio Lebran | Italy | Parma | Venezia | Co-ownership, Undisclosed |
| 2008-07-11 | Emanuele Terranova | Italy | Palermo | Livorno | Loan |
| 2008-07-11 | Alessandro Borgese | Italy | Sassuolo | Monza | Co-ownership, Undisclosed |
| 2008-07-11 | Paolino Corno | Italy | Bari | Monza | Loan |
| 2008-07-11 | Simone Iacoponi | Italy | Empoli | Monza | Loan |
| 2008-07-11 | Samuele Pizza | Italy | Empoli | Monza | Loan |
| 2008-07-11 | Cristian Cesaretti | Italy | Empoli | Monza | Loan |
| 2008-07-11 | Saverio Macrì | Italy | Internazionale | Monza | |
| 2008-07-11 | Giacomo Bindi | Italy | Internazionale | Monza | Loan |
| 2008-07-11 | Dennis Esposito | Italy | Internazionale (youth) | Reggiana | Loan |
| 2008-07-11 | Paolo Tornaghi | Italy | Internazionale | Como | Loan |
| 2008-07-11 | Simone Fautario | Italy | Internazionale | Pistoiese | Loan |
| 12 July 2008 | Alessandro D'Antoni | Italy | Juventus (youth) | Giulianova | Loan |
| 2008-07-12 | Fabio Romeo | Italy | Lecce | Varese | Co-ownership, Undisclosed |
| 2008-07-12 | Christian Iannelli | Italy | Catania | Catanzaro | Co-ownership, Undisclosed |
| 2008-07-12 | Dario Bergamelli | Italy | Atalanta | Verona | Loan |
| 2008-07-12 | Marco Di Fatta | Italy | Catania | Pistoiese | Co-ownership, Undisclosed |
| 2008-07-12 | Fabrizio Lasagna | Italy | Catania | Paganese | Co-ownership, Undisclosed |
| 2008-07-12 | Samuele Costanzo | Italy | Catania | Paganese | Loan |
| 2008-07-12 | Adrian Bică Bădan | Romania | Catania | Vibonese | Co-ownership, Undisclosed |
| 2008-07-12 | Federico Conti | Italy | Catania | Vibonese | Loan |
| 2008-07-12 | Filippo Andrea Scozzese | Italy | Catania | Vibonese | Loan |
| 2008-07-12 | Alberto Cossentino | Italy | Palermo | Triestina | Loan |
| 2008-07-12 | Leonardo Martín Migliónico | Uruguay | Sampdoria | Livorno | Loan |
| 2008-07-12 | Pietro Arnulfo | Italy | Sampdoria | Cuoiocappiano | Loan |
| 2008-07-12 | Carmine Cucciniello | Italy | Sampdoria | Perugia | Loan |
| 2008-07-12 | Moussa Diarra | Côte d'Ivoire | Sampdoria | Catanzaro | Co-ownership, Undisclosed |
| 2008-07-12 | Gabriel Ferrari | United States | Sampdoria | Perugia | Loan |
| 2008-07-12 | Manuel Ustulin | Italy | Sampdoria | San Marino | Co-ownership, Undisclosed |
| 2008-07-12 | Paolo Castellazzi | Italy | Sampdoria | Ternana | Loan |
| 2008-07-12 | Simone Ciancio | Italy | Sampdoria | Alessandria | Loan |
| 2008-07-12 | Nicola Donato | Italy | Sampdoria | Pavia | Co-ownership, Undisclosed |
| 2008-07-12 | Alessandro Romeo | Italy | Sampdoria | Legnano | Co-ownership, Undisclosed |
| 2008-07-12 | Francesco Virdis | Italy | Sampdoria | Legnano | Loan |
| 2008-07-12 | Giovanni Taormina | Italy | Sampdoria | Como | Loan |
| 2008-07-12 | Gianluca Di Gennaro | Italy | Sampdoria | Valenzana | Co-ownership, €500 |
| 2008-07-12 | Bruno Fontes da Mota | Switzerland | Sampdoria | Taranto | Loan |
| 2008-07-13 | Miguel Britos | Uruguay | (Uruguay) Montevideo Wanderers | Bologna | Undisclosed |
| 14 July 2008 | Cristiano Novembre | Italy | Juventus | Figline | Free |
| 2008-07-14 | Davide Moscardelli | Italy | Rimini | Piacenza | Co-ownership, Undisclosed |
| 2008-07-14 | Thomas Som | Cameroon | Parma (youth) | Carpenedolo | Loan |
| 2008-07-14 | Fabio Virgili | Italy | Parma | Carpenedolo | Loan |
| 2008-07-14 | Emanuele Orlandi | Italy | Milan (youth) | Carpenedolo | Undisclosed |
| 2008-07-14 | Salvatore Moring | Italy | Rosarnese (amateur) | Grosseto | Undisclosed |
| 2008-07-14 | Daniel Margarita | Italy | Teramo | Grosseto | Undisclosed |
| 2008-07-15 | Andrea De Falco | Italy | Chievo | Ancona | Loan |
| 2008-07-15 | Stefano Olivieri | Italy | Chievo | Ancona | Loan |
| 2008-07-15 | Daniele Pedrelli | Italy | Internazionale | Treviso | Co-ownership, €0.275m |
| 2008-07-15 | Leandro Grimi | Argentina | Milan | (Portugal) Sporting | €2.5M + bonus |
| 2008-07-15 | Diego Rodríguez | Uruguay | (Uruguay) Peñarol | Bologna | Loan |
| 2008-07-15 | Christian Bucchi | Italy | Napoli | Ascoli | Loan |
| 2008-07-15 | Giuseppe Lolaico | Italy | Potenza | Rimini | Undisclosed |
| 15 July 2008 | Jaroslav Šedivec | Czech Republic | Triestina | Mantova | Loan |
| 15 July 2008 | Simone Salviato | Italy | Rovigo | Mantova | Undisclosed |
| 2008-07-16 | Matteo Trini | Italy | Juventus | South Tyrol | Loan |
| 2008-07-16 | Claudio Cafiero | Italy | Roma (youth) | Crotone | Loan |
| 2008-07-16 | Edgar Çani | Albania | Palermo | Ascoli | Loan |
| 2008-07-16 | Mirko Cudini | Italy | Vicenza | Perugia | Undisclosed |
| 2008-07-16 | Ugo Gabrieli | Italy | Lecce (youth) | Poggibonsi | Loan |
| 2008-07-16 | Niccolò Manfredini | Italy | Fiorentina | Gubbio | Loan |
| 2008-07-16 | Nicola Urso | Italy | Fiorentina (youth) | Gubbio (youth) | Loan |
| 2008-07-16 | Mattia Ascani | Italy | Bologna | Sambenedettese | |
| 2008-07-17 | Salvatore Masiello | Italy | Udinese | Bari | Co-ownership, €0.2M |
| 2008-07-17 | Diogo Tavares | Portugal | Genoa | Frosinone | Co-ownership, €0.3M |
| 2008-07-17 | Nikolas Kras | Italy | Reggina | Sorrento | Loan |
| 2008-07-17 | Fabio Ceccarelli | Italy | Treviso | Monopoli | Loan |
| 2008-07-17 | Filippo Savi | Italy | Parma | SPAL | Loan |
| 2008-07-18 | Daniele Giordano | Italy | Lecce (youth) | (Scotland) Celtic | Free |
| 2008-07-18 | Renan Wagner | Brazil | Vicenza (youth) | Internazionale (youth) | Loan |
| 2008-07-18 | Adriano Mezavilla | Brazil | Catania | Perugia | Loan |
| 2008-07-18 | Luca Fiuzzi | Italy | Empoli | Foligno | Loan |
| 2008-07-18 | David Silva Fernandes | Brazil | Chievo | Varese | Undisclsoed |
| 2008-07-18 | Alex Manninger | Austria | (Austria) Red Bull Salzburg | Udinese | Undisclosed |
| 2008-07-18 | Pietro Tripoli | Italy | Palermo | Varese | Co-ownership, €500 |
| 2008-07-18 | Giuseppe Polito | Italy | Palermo | Vibonese | Co-ownership, €500 |
| 2008-07-18 | Stefano Mandorino | Italy | Lecce | Manfredonia | Loan |
| 2008-07-18 | Simone Perico | Italy | Atalanta | Poggibonsi | Loan |
| 2008-07-18 | Tommaso Romito | Italy | Napoli | Pescara | Co-ownership, €0.1m |
| 2008-07-18 | Fabio Pisacane | Italy | Genoa | Chievo | Undisclosed |
| 2008-07-18 | Ludovic Giuly | France | Roma | (France) PSG | €2.5M |
| 2008-07-18 | Federico Erba | Italy | Roma (youth) | Lanciano | Loan |
| 2008-07-18 | Vitorino Antunes | Portugal | Roma | Lecce | Loan, €0.2M |
| 2008-07-18 | Ivan Artipoli | Italy | Lazio | Modena | Loan |
| 2008-07-19 | Alberto Galuppo | Italy | Parma | Venezia | Loan |
| 2008-07-19 | Júnior Costa | Brazil | Varese | Ancona | Undisclosed |
| 2008-07-19 | Alberto Comazzi | Italy | Verona | Ancona | Loan |
| 2008-07-19 | Matteo Lunati | Italy | Milan | Como | €1,000 |
| 2008-07-19 | Patrick Kalambay | Italy | Milan | Como | Loan |
| 2008-07-19 | Davide Colomba | Italy | Bologna | Foggia | Undisclosed |
| | Alessandro Osso | Italy | Udinese | Celano | Loan |
| 2008-07-21 | Nicola Redomi | Italy | Internazionale | Valenzana | Co-ownership, €500 |
| 2008-07-21 | Matuzalém | Brazil | (Spain) Real Zaragoza | Lazio | Loan |
| 2008-07-21 | Gaby Mudingayi | Belgium | Lazio | Bologna | €7M |
| 2008-07-22 | Juan Zúñiga | Colombia | (Colombia) Atlético Nacional | Siena | Undisclosed |
| 2008-07-22 | Sidny | Brazil | Livorno | (Brazil) Sport | Loan |
| 2008-07-22 | Ivan Piccoli | Italy | Cesena | Ancona | Undisclosed |
| 2008-07-22 | Maurizio Anastasi | Italy | Cesena | Ancona | Undisclosed |
| 2008-07-22 | Nicolò De Cesare | Italy | Internazionale | Monza | Loan |
| 2008-07-22 | Rincon | Brazil | Internazionale | Ancona | Loan |
| 2008-07-23 | Leonardo Blanchard | Italy | Siena (youth) | Valle del Giovenco | Loan |
| 2008-07-23 | Manuel Fusarelli | Italy | Siena (youth) | Valle del Giovenco | ? |
| 2008-07-23 | Matteo Prandelli | Italy | Siena (youth) | Valle del Giovenco | Loan |
| 2008-07-23 | Valon Behrami | Switzerland | Lazio | (England) West Ham | £5M / €6M |
| 2008-07-23 | Steve Pinau | France | (France) AS Monaco | Genoa | Free (€0.56M training compensation) |
| 2008-07-23 | Enrico Alfonso | Italy | Inter | Pisa | Loan |
| 2008-07-24 | Federico Agliardi | Italy | Palermo | Rimini | Loan |
| 2008-07-24 | Danilo Soddimo | Italy | Sampdoria | Ancona | Loan |
| 2008-07-24 | Mirko Guadalupi | Italy | Siena | Ancona | Loan |
| 2008-07-25 | Alessandro Lucarelli | Italy | Genoa | Parma | €1.2M |
| 2008-07-25 | Leonardo Massoni | Italy | Lucchese | Sassuolo | Free |
| 2008-07-25 | Maikol Benassi | Italy | Lucchese | Empoli | Free |
| 2008-07-25 | Leonardo Massoni | Italy | Sassuolo | Viareggio | Co-ownership, Undisclosed |
| 2008-07-25 | Maikol Benassi | Italy | Empoli | Viareggio | Co-ownership, Undisclosed |
| 2008-07-25 | Andrea Russotto | Italy | (Switzerland) Bellinzona | Napoli | Loan |
| 2008-07-25 | Lorenzo Poli | Italy | Roma | Vibonese | Loan |
| 2008-07-25 | Giuseppe Caccavallo | Italy | Lecce | Sorrento | Loan |
| 2008-07-25 | Francesco Zanardini | Italy | Brescia | Lumezzane | Co-ownership, Undisclosed |
| 2008-07-25 | Luigi Scaglia | Italy | Brescia | Lumezzane | Loan |
| 2008-07-25 | Federico Ciasca | Italy | Brescia | Lumezzane | Co-ownership, Undisclosed |
| 2008-07-25 | Fabio Pisacane | Italy | Chievo | Lumezzane | Co-ownership, Undisclosed |
| 2008-07-25 | Shadi Ghosheh | Italy | Messina | Chievo | Free |
| 2008-07-25 | Shadi Ghosheh | Italy | Chievo | Bassano | Co-ownership, €500 |
| 2008-07-27 | Ikechukwu Kalu | Nigeria | Sampdoria | (Switzerland) Bellinzona | Undisclosed |
| 2008-07-28 | Gianni Fabiano | Italy | Parma | Bassano | Co-ownership, Undisclosed |
| 2008-07-28 | Renato Piovezan | Brazil | Chievo | Mezzocorona | Co-ownership, Undisclosed |
| 2008-07-28 | Daniele Marino | Italy | Internazionale | Sambenedettese | Co-ownership, €500 |
| 2008-07-28 | Adam Kokoszka | Poland | (Poland) Wisła Kraków | Empoli | Undisclosed |
| 2008-07-29 | Claudio De Sousa | Italy | Torino | Pescara | Co-ownership, Undisclosed |
| 29 July 2008 | Dino Fava | Treviso | Salernitana | Loan | |
| 29 July 2008 | Manolo Pestrin | Messina | Salernitana | Free | |
| 29 July 2008 | Andrea Gaveglia | Messina | Avellino | Free | |
| 30 July 2008 | Ferdinando Sforzini | Udinese | Grosseto | Loan | |
| 2008-07-30 | Mattia Ferrato | Parma | Melfi | Co-ownership, Undisclosed | |
| 2008-07-30 | Filipe Gomes | Brazil | Fiorentina (youth) | Roma | Free |
| 2008-07-30 | Federico Gerardi | Italy | Udinese | Salernitana | Loan |
| 2008-07-30 | Georgios Kyriazis | Greece | Triestina | Salernitana | Free |
| 2008-07-31 | Desmond N'Ze | Ghana | Internazionale | Avellino | Co-ownership, €500 |
| 2008-07-31 | Alessandro Iacobucci | Italy | Renato Curi Angolana | Mantova (youth) | Undisclosed |

== See also ==
- List of Italian football transfers Summer 2008 (co-ownership)
