= List of Italian football transfers summer 2009 (co-ownership) =

This is a list of Italian football transfers for co-ownership resolutions, for the 2009–10 season, from and to Serie A and Serie B.

| Date | Name | Nat | Co-owner club | Mother club | Result | Fee |
|---|---|---|---|---|---|---|
| 24 June 2009 | Ignazio Abate | Italy | Torino | Milan | Milan | €2.55M |
| | Niky Agnorelli | Italy | Cuoiopelli | Empoli | N.D. | |
| 2009-06-25 | Andrea Alberti | Italy | Monza | Brescia | N.D. (Monza) | |
| 2009-06-25 | Enrico Alfonso | Italy | Internazionale | Chievo | Renewed | |
| 2009-06-26 | Ilario Aloe | Italy | Ascoli | Internazionale | N.D. (Ascoli) | |
| 30 June 2009 | Federico Amenta | Italy | Lanciano | Padova | ND | |
| 2009-06-25 | Maycol Andriani | Italy | Sambonifacese | Chievo | N.D. (Sambonifacese) | |
| 2009-06-26 | Angelo Antonazzo | Italy | Frosinone | Chievo | Chievo | Undisclosed |
| 2009-07-01 | Luca Antonelli | Italy | Parma | Milan | Parma | €2.5M |
| 2009-06-25 | Matteo Ardemagni | Italy | Triestina | Milan | Triestina | €50,000 |
| 2009-06-26 | Andrea Arrigoni | Italy | Mezzocorona | Atalanta | Atalanta | Undisclosed |
| 2009-06-19 | Ivan Artipoli | Italy | Lazio | Sampdoria | Renewed | |
| 2009-06-25 | Davide Astori | Italy | Cagliari | A.C. Milan | Renewed | |
| 2009-06-25 | Fabrizio Avanzini | Italy | Sambonifacese | Mantova | Mantova | Undisclosed |
| 2009-06-26 | Ivano Baldanzeddu | Italy | Foligno | Empoli | Empoli | Undisclosed |
| 2009-06-26 | Pietro Balistreri | Italy | Monopoli | Palermo | Renewed | |
| | Leonardo Bardeggia | Argentina | Cassino | Salernitana | N.D. | |
| | Giovanni Barreca | Italy | Treviso | Udinese | N.D. | |
| 2009-06-26 | Ahmed Barusso | Ghana | Roma | Rimini | Renewed | |
| | Luca Bellucci | Italy | Manfredonia | Livorno | ND | |
| 2009-06-26 | Nicola Belmonte | Italy | Siena | Bari | Renewed | |
| 2009-06-25 | Maikol Benassi | Italy | Esperia Viareggio | Empoli | Renewed | |
| 2009-06-25 | Gianluigi Bianco | Italy | Empoli | Sampdoria | Sampdoria | Undisclosed |
| 2009-06-26 | Adrian Bică Bădan | Romania | Vibonese | Catania | Catania | Undisclosed |
| 2009-06-26 | Mirko Bigazzi | Italy | Carrarese | Livorno | Renewed | |
| | Fabio Bizzarri | Italy | Melfi | Ascoli | N.D. | |
| 2009-06-26 | Salvatore Bocchetti | Italy | Genoa | Frosinone | Genoa | €2.3M |
| | Nicolò Bodini | Italy | Rodengo Saiano | Brescia | N.D. | |
| 2009-06-25 | Massimo Bonanni | Italy | Sampdoria | Palermo | N.D. (Sampdoria) | |
| | Alessandro Borgese | Italy | Monza | Sassuolo | N.D. | |
| 2009-06-26 | Martino Borghese | Italy | Pescara | Genoa | Genoa | Undisclosed |
| | Daniele Bricchetti | Italy | Olbia | Brescia | N.D. | |
| | Antonio Brizzi | Italy | Valenzana | Empoli | N.D. | |
| 2009-06-25 | Rosario Bucolo | Italy | Reggiana | Catania | Renewed | |
| | Nicola Bulla | Italy | Cuoiopelli | Atalanta | N.D. | |
| 2009-06-26 | Daniele Cacia | Italy | Lecce | Piacenza | Renewed | |
| 2009-06-26 | Emanuele Calaiò | Italy | Siena | Napoli | Renewed | |
| 2009-06-26 | Caetano Prósperi Calil | Brazil | Siena | Crotone | Siena | |
| 26 June 2009 | Giampaolo Calzi | Italy | Ravenna | Sampdoria | ND (Ravenna) | |
| | Nicola Campedelli | Italy | Cesena | Modena | N.D. (Retited) | |
| 2009-06-25 | Luisito Campisi | Italy | Verona | Atalanta | Renewed | |
| 2009-06-25 | Riccardo Capogna | Italy | Mezzocorona | Lazio | Lazio | Undisclosed |
| 2009-06-26 | Davide Carcuro | Italy | Fiorentina | Treviso | Treviso | €60,000 |
| 2009-06-25 | Denny Cardin | Italy | Portogruaro | Atalanta | Renewed | |
| | Gaetano Carrieri | Italy | Manfredonia | Livorno | N.D. | |
| 2009-06-25 | Andrea Catellani | Italy | Catania | Reggiana | Catania | Undisclosed |
| 2009-06-25 | Matteo Cavagna | Italy | Ravenna | Juventus | N.D. (Ravenna) | Undisclosed |
| 2009-06-26 | Lorenzo Cecchi | Italy | Prato | Chievo | Prato | Undisclosed |
| 25 June 2009 | (Argentina) Franco Chiavarini | Cesena | Triestina | ND (Cesena) | Free | |
| | Daniele Chiocchetti | Italy | Colligiana | Empoli | N.D. | |
| 2009-06-25 | Michael Cia | Italy | Atalanta | Südtirol | Atalanta | Undisclosed |
| 2009-06-26 | Federico Ciasca | Italy | Lumezzane | Brescia | Renewed | |
| 2009-06-25 | Luca Cigarini | Italy | Atalanta | Parma | Renewed | |
| 2009-06-25 | Karamoko Cissé | Guinea | AlbinoLeffe | Atalanta | Renewed | |
| 2009-06-26 | Éder Citadin Martins | Brazil | Frosinone | Empoli | Empoli | Undisclosed |
| 2009-06-23 | Andrea Cocco | Italy | Rovigo | Cagliari | Cagliari | Undisclosed |
| 2009-06-26 | Massimo Coda | Italy | Bologna | Treviso | Bologna | €100,000 |
| 2009-06-26 | Riccardo Colombo | Italy | Torino | AlbinoLeffe | Torino | Undisclosed |
| 2009-06-26 | Marco Compagnone | Italy | Real Marcianise | Sampdoria | Real Marcianise | Undisclosed |
| 2009-06-26 | Gianmarco Conti | Italy | Milan | Venezia | A.C. Milan | €50,000 |
| 2009-06-25 | Ferdinando Coppola | Italy | Atalanta | Milan | Renewed | |
| 2009-06-26 | Manuel Coppola | Italy | Siena | Genoa | Siena | €1.5M (player exchange) |
| 2009-06-25 | Mattia Corradi | Italy | AlbinoLeffe | Monza | AlbinoLeffe | Undisclosed |
| | Cristoforo Correale | Italy | Juve Stabia | Udinese | N.D. | |
| | Thomas Cortese | Italy | Pistoiese | Chievo | N.D. | |
| | Alessandro Cortesi | Italy | SPAL | Bologna | ND | |
| 2009-06-26 | Alessandro Corvesi | Italy | Prato | Lazio | Prato | Undisclosed |
| | Andrea Cosner | Italy | Reggiana | Milan | ND | |
| | Giacomo Cotellessa | Italy | Sangiovannese | Genoa | ND | |
| 26 June 2009 | Giuseppe Cozzolino | Italy | Cremonese | Lecce | Lecce | Undisclosed |
| 25 June 2009 | (Romania) Cristian Cristea | Triestina | Cesena | ND (Triestina) | Free | |
| 25 June 2009 | Andrè Cuneaz | Italy | Mantova | Juventus | Renewed | |
| 2009-06-26 | Gianluca Curci | Italy | Siena | Roma | Renewed | |
| 2009-06-26 | Patrick D'Aguanno | Italy | Potenza | Chievo | Renewed | |
| 2009-06-26 | Marco Dalla Costa | Italy | Pro Sesto | Internazionale | Renewed | |
| 2009-06-26 | Danilo D'Ambrosio | Italy | Juve Stabia | Fiorentina | Juve Stabia | |
| 2009-06-26 | Biagio Del Giudice | Italy | Aversa Normanna | Napoli | Aversa Normanna | |
| 2009-06-26 | Cristiano Del Grosso | Italy | Siena | Cagliari | Siena | Undisclosed |
| 2009-06-26 | Luigi Della Rocca | Italy | Triestina | Bologna | Triestina | Undisclosed |
| 26 June 2009 | Lorenzo Del Prete | Siena | Juventus | Siena | €130,000 | |
| 26 June 2009 | Salvatore Del Sole | Carpenedolo | Parma | Parma | Undisclosed | |
| | Nico De Lucia | South Tyrol | Chievo | ND (South Tyrol) | | |
| | Claudio De Sousa | Italy | Pescara | Torino | N.D. | |
| 2009-06-25 | Daniele Dessena | Italy | Sampdoria | Parma | Renewed | |
| 2009-06-26 | Fabio Di Benedetto | Italy | San Marino | Bologna | Renewed | |
| 2009-06-26 | Marco Di Fatta | Italy | Pistoiese | Catania | Catania | Undisclosed |
| 2009-06-26 | Davide Di Gennaro | Italy | Genoa | A.C. Milan | A.C. Milan | Undisclosed |
| | Gianluca Di Gennaro | Italy | Valenzana | Sampdoria | N.D. | |
| 25 June 2009 | Pietro De Giorgio | Italy | Perugia | Frosinone | ND (Perugia) | Free |
| | Arturo Di Napoli | Italy | Salernitana | Siena | N.D. (Salernitana) | |
| | Angelo Di Nardo | Italy | Legnano | Livorno | N.D. | |
| 2009-06-26 | Antonio Di Nardo | Italy | Padova | Frosinone | Padova | |
| 26 June 2009 | Nunzio Di Roberto | Italy | Frosinone | Foggia | Foggia | Auction, Undisclosed |
| 2009-06-26 | Antonio Di Silvestro | Italy | Monza | Lecce | Lecce | |
| | Moussa Diarra | Ivory Coast | Catanzaro | Sampdoria | N.D. | |
| | Emilio Dierna | Italy | Sangiovannese | Grosseto | N.D. | |
| 2009-06-23 | Marcus Diniz | Brazil | Livorno | A.C. Milan | A.C. Milan | €2.5M (player exchange) |
| 2009-06-25 | Maurizio Domizzi | Italy | Udinese | Napoli | Udinese | €1M |
| 2009-06-26 | Morris Donati | Italy | Sampdoria | Brescia | Renewed | |
| | Nicola Donato | Italy | Pavia | Sampdoria | N.D. | |
| 2009-06-26 | Nicola Donazzan | Italy | Sassuolo | Mantova | Renewed | |
| 2009-06-26 | Almamy Doumbia | Ivory Coast | Bari | Andria | Andria | |
| 2009-06-26 | Mirko Eramo | Italy | Sampdoria | Bari | Renewed | |
| 2009-06-26 | Mattia Evangelisti | Italy | Vicenza | Sambenedettese | Vicenza | |
| | Gianni Fabiano | Italy | Bassano Virtus | Parma | N.D. | |
| 2009-06-26 | Ivan Fatić | Montenegro | Internazionale | Chievo | Chievo | Undisclosed |
| 2009-06-26 | Daniele Federici | Italy | Grosseto | Internazionale | Renewed | |
| 2009-06-26 | Carlo Ferrario | Italy | Prato | Chievo | Prato | |
| 2009-06-26 | Mattia Ferrato | Italy | Melfi | Parma | Parma | |
| 2009-06-25 | Fabio Foglia | Italy | Piacenza | Pescara | Renewed | |
| | Daniele Fornaio | Italy | Venezia | Udinese | N.D. | |
| 2009-06-26 | Filippo Foro | Italy | Vicenza | Sambenedettese | Renewed | |
| 2009–08-03 | Salvatore Foti | Italy | Udinese | Sampdoria | Sampdoria | |
| 2009-06-26 | Michele Franco | Italy | Como | Bari | Como | |
| 2009-07-17 | Nicolas Frey | France | Chievo | Modena | Chievo | Undisclosed |
| 2009-06-26 | Alberto Frison | Italy | Vicenza | Treviso | Vicenza | |
| 25 June 2009 | Gianluca Galasso | Italy | Bari | Roma | ND (Bari) | Free |
| 2009-06-26 | Niccolo Galli | Italy | Pergocrema | Parma | Renewed | |
| | Marco Gallozzi | Italy | Gubbio | Ascoli | N.D. | |
| 2009-06-08 | György Garics | Austria | Atalanta | Napoli | Atalanta | €1M |
| 2009-06-25 | Stefano Garzon | Italy | Verona | Chievo | Verona | Undisclosed |
| 2009-06-26 | Andrea Gasbarroni | Italy | Torino | Genoa | N.D. (Torino) | |
| 2009-06-26 | Andrea Gaspari | Italy | SPAL | Brescia | Renewed | |
| | Andrea Gasparri | Italy | Parma | Siena | N.D. | |
| | Giuseppe Gemmiti | Italy | Cassino | Frosinone | N.D. | |
| | Simone Ghezzi | Italy | Pizzighettone | Brescia | N.D. | |
| | Daniele Ghidotti | Italy | Pergocrema | Mantova | N.D. | |
| | Tomasso Ghinassi | Italy | Pistoiese | Parma | N.D. | |
| 2009-06-26 | Shadi Ghosheh | Tunisia | Bassano Virtus | Chievo | Renewed | |
| 2009-06-25 | Nicolas Giani | Italy | Vicenza | Internazionale | Renewed | |
| 2009-06-24 | Giorgio Gianola | Italy | A.C. Milan | Monza | A.C. Milan | Undisclosed |
| | Davide Giorgino | Italy | Taranto | Lecce | N.D. | |
| | Luca Giunchi | Italy | Celano | Grosseto | N.D. | |
| | Juan Ignacio Gomez Taleb | Argentina | Hellas Verona | Triestina | N.D. | |
| | Rivaldo González | Paraguay | SPAL | Genoa | N.D. (SPAL) | |
| 2009-06-19 | Pablo Granoche | Uruguay | Chievo | Triestina | Renewed | |
| 25 June 2009 | Daniele Greco | Italy | Sorrento | Lazio | ND (Sorrento) | |
| | Marco Gronchi | Italy | Valenzana | Empoli | N.D. | |
| 24 June 2009 | Alex Guerci | Italy | Pergocrema | Milan | Pergocrema | €10,000 |
| | Vincenzo Guglielmelli | Italy | Cisco Roma | Ascoli | N.D. | |
| | Nicholas Guidi | Italy | Frosinone | Lucchese | N.D. | |
| | Tomás Guzmán | Paraguay | Piacenza | Juventus | N.D. (Piacenza) | |
| 25 June 2009 | Albin Hodza | France | Sorrento | Udinese | ND (Sorrento) | |
| | Pasquale Iadaresta | Italy | Foligno | Siena | N.D. | |
| 2009-06-26 | Christian Iannelli | Italy | Catanzaro | Catania | Catania | Undisclosed |
| 2009-06-26 | Andre Jidayi | Italy | Mantova | Cesena | Cesena | Undisclosed |
| 2009-06-23 | Luis Jiménez | Chile | Internazionale | Ternana | Renewed | |
| 2009-06-26 | Vitali Kutuzov | Belarus | Bari | Parma | Bari | Undisclosed |
| 2009-06-26 | Giovanni La Camera | Italy | Rimini | Padova | Rimini | Undisclosed |
| 25 June 2009 | Mirko Lamantia | Italy | Genoa | Novara | ND (Genoa) | Free |
| 2009-06-25 | Davide Lanzafame | Italy | Palermo | Juventus | Renewed | |
| 2009-06-25 | Andrea Lazzari | Italy | Cagliari | Atalanta | Renewed | |
| 2009-06-26 | Fabio Lebran | Italy | Venezia | Parma | Parma | Undisclosed |
| 2009-06-25 | Fabio Lima da Silva | Brazil | Sambonifacese | Chievo | Chievo | Undisclosed |
| 26 June 2009 | Matteo Lombardo | Italy | Legnano | Internazionale | Internazionale | Auction, Undisclosed |
| 2009-06-25 | Francesco Lunardini | Italy | Parma | Rimini | Renewed | |
| 2009-06-25 | Ibrahim Maaroufi | Morocco | Vicenza | Internazionale | Vicenza | Undisclosed |
| | Daniele Magliocchetti | Italy | Cagliari | Roma | N.D. (Cagliari) | |
| 25 June 2009 | Matteo Mandorlini | Italy | Foligno | Parma | Parma | Undisclosed |
| 26 June 2009 | Daniele Marino | Italy | Sambenedettese | Internazionale | Sambenedettese | Auction, €1,000 |
| 2009-06-25 | Daniele Martinetti | Italy | Sassuolo | Arezzo | Renewed | |
| 26 June 2009 | Mirko Martucci | Italy | SPAL | Genoa | Renewed | |
| 2009-06-23 | Andrea Masiello | Italy | Bari | Genoa | Bari | €0.8M |
| 2009-06-25 | Mattia Masiero | Italy | Torino | Ancona | ND (Torino) | |
| | Simone Masini | Italy | Ascoli | Lucchese | ND (Ascoli) | |
| 25 June 2009 | Leonardo Massoni | Italy | Viareggio | Sassuolo | Sassuolo | Undisclosed |
| 25 June 2009 | Italo Mattioli | Italy | Foggia | Lecce | ND (Foggia) | |
| 25 June 2009 | Riccardo Meggiorini | Italy | Cittadella | Internazionale | Internazionale | €2.5M |
| | Giandomenico Mesto | Italy | Genoa | Reggina | Genoa | €3M |
| | Federico Melchiorri | Italy | Sambenedettese | Siena | ND | |
| 26 June 2009 | Andrea Menegon | Italy | Giacomense | Padova | Padova | Undisclosed |
| 2009-06-25 | Davide Micheloni | Italy | Sambonifacese | Mantova | Mantova | Undisclosed |
| 2009-06-25 | Vittorio Micolucci | Italy | Ascoli | Udinese | Renewed | |
| | Leonardo Migliónico | Uruguay | Sampdoria | Piacenza | | |
| 2009-06-25 | Antonio Mirante | Italy | Sampdoria | Juventus | Renewed | |
| 2009-06-25 | José Montiel | Paraguay | Reggina | Udinese | Renewed | |
| 2009-06-25 | Leonardo Moracci | Italy | Verona | Chievo | Chievo | Undisclosed |
| | Alessandro Moro | Italy | Treviso | Udinese | | |
| 32009-06-26 | Davide Moscardelli | Italy | Piacenza | Rimini | Renewed | |
| 2009-06-25 | Gianni Munari | Italy | Lecce | Palermo | Renewed | |
| 2009-06-25 | Mattia Mustacchio | Italy | Sampdoria | Brescia | Renewed | |
| 2009-06-26 | Papa Waigo N'Diaye | Senegal | Fiorentina | Genoa | Renewed | |
| | Desmond N'Ze | Italy | Avellino | Internazionale | N.D. (Avellino) | |
| 2009-06-24 | Daniel Offredi | Italy | Pro Sesto | A.C. Milan | A.C. Milan | Undisclosed |
| 2009-07-24 | Diego Oliveira | Brazil | Cittadella | Chievo | Renewed | |
| 25 June 2009 | Alessandro Osso | Italy | Colligiana | Udinese | ND (Colligiana) | Free |
| | Simone Palermo | Italy | Treviso | Roma | ND (Treviso) | |
| 2009-06-25 | Raffaele Palladino | Italy | Genoa | Juventus | Renewed | |
| 2009-06-16 | Alberto Paloschi | Italy | Parma | A.C. Milan | Renewed | |
| 2009-06-26 | Michele Paolucci | Italy | Udinese | Juventus | Juventus | Undisclosed |
| 2009-06-25 | Marco Parolo | Italy | Verona | Chievo | Chievo | Undisclosed |
| 2009-06-23 | Andrea Peana | Italy | Triestina | Cagliari | Cagliari | Undisclosed |
| 2009–06-26 | Daniele Pedrelli | Italy | Treviso | Internazionale | N.D. (Internazionale) | |
| 11 August 2009 | Mirko Pennesi | Italy | Ascoli | Ternana | Ascoli | Undisclosed |
| 2009-06-23 | Romano Perticone | Italy | Livorno | A.C. Milan | Livorno | €2.5M (player exchange) |
| 30 June 2009 | Marco Petrassi | Italy | Padova | Vigor Lamezia | ND | |
| 2009-06-25 | Marco Petresini | Italy | Sambonifacese | Chievo | Sambonifacese | Undisclosed |
| 26 June 2009 | Gianmarco Piccioni | Italy | Vicenza | Sambenedettese | Renewed | |
| 27 June 2009 | Marco Piccinni | Italy | Noicattaro | Bari | Bari | Undisclosed |
| 26 June 2009 | Stefano Pietribiasi | Italy | Sambenedettese | Vicenza | Renewed | |
| 26 June 2009 | Fabio Pisacane | Italy | Lumezzane | Chievo | Renewed | |
| | Federico Piovaccari | Italy | Treviso | Internazionale | ND (Treviso) | |
| 2009-06-19 | Renato Piovezan | Brazil | Mezzocorona | Chievo | Chievo | Undisclosed |
| 2009-06-25 | Lorenzo Poli | Italy | Benevento | Roma | ND (Benevento) | |
| 26 June 2009 | German Pomiro | Argentina | Vicenza | Sambenedettese | Renewed | |
| 2009-06-25 | Andrea Pozzato | Italy | Canavese | Juventus | Renewed | |
| | Serhiy Predko | Ukraine | Pro Sesto | Torino | ND | |
| 2009-08-10 | Davide Puddu | Italy | Alghero | Cagliari | Cagliari | Undisclosed |
| 2009-08-10 | Roberto Puddu | Italy | Alghero | Cagliari | Cagliari | Undisclosed |
| 2009-06-26 | Andrea Ranocchia | Italy | Genoa | Arezzo | Genoa | Undisclosed |
| 2009-06-26 | Nicola Redomi | Italy | Valenzana | Internazionale | ND (Valenzana) | |
| 26 June 2009 | Francesco Renzetti | Italy | AlbinoLeffe | Genoa | Genoa | Auction, €0.25M |
| 2009-06-25 | Michele Rigione | Italy | Internazionale | Chievo | Renewed | |
| 2009-06-24 | Luca Rigoni | Italy | Chievo | Vicenza | Chievo | Undisclosed |
| 26 June 2009 | Giuseppe Rizza | Italy | Livorno | Juventus | Livorno | Auction, Undisclosed |
| 2009-06-25 | Fabio Romeo | Italy | Varese | Lecce | Lecce | Undisclosed |
| 2009-06-25 | Simone Sales | Italy | Cuoiopelli | Atalanta | Atalanta | Undisclosed |
| 26 June 2009 | Gleison Santos | Italy | Reggina | Genoa | Renewed | |
| 2009-06-25 | Riccardo Saponara | Italy | Empoli | Ravenna | Renewed | |
| 26 June 2009 | Filippo Savi | Italy | SPAL | Parma | Parma | Undisclosed |
| 2009-06-25 | Matteo Scozzarella | Italy | Portogruaro | Atalanta | Renewed | |
| 2009-06-26 | Alessio Sestu | Italy | Avellino | Reggina | Avellino | Auction |
| 2009-06-25 | Guilherme Siqueira | Brazil | Udinese | Internazionale | N.D. (Udinese) | |
| 2009-06-26 | Angelo Siniscalchi | Italy | Ascoli | Salernitana | Ascoli | Auction |
| 25 June 2009 | Davide Succi | Italy | Palermo | Ravenna | Palermo | €1.3M |
| 2009-06-26 | Diogo Tavares | Portugal | Frosinone | Genoa | Renewed | |
| 26 June 2009 | Luca Tedeschi | | Treviso | Bologna | Treviso | €1,000 |
| 2009-07-24 | Mario Titone | Italy | Sambenedettese | Sassuolo | Sassuolo | Free |
| 2009-06-26 | Robson Toledo | Brazil | Ravenna | Udinese | Ravenna | Undisclosed |
| 26 June 2009 | Magnus Troest | Italy | Genoa | Parma | Genoa | €0.9M |
| 2009-06-26 | Gennaro Troianiello | Italy | Frosinone | Chievo | Frosinone | Undisclosed |
| 2009-06-26 | Alessandro Tulli | Italy | Piacenza | Lecce | Renewed | |
| 2009-06-25 | Mirko Valdifiori | Italy | Empoli | Cesena | Empoli | Undisclosed |
| 2009-06-25 | Alex Valentini | Italy | Sambonifacese | Mantova | Mantova | Undisclosed |
| | Marco Valtulina | Italy | Torino | Pro Sesto | ND (Torino) | |
| 2009-06-25 | Daniele Vantaggiato | Italy | Parma | Rimini | Renewed | |
| 2009-06-26 | Emiliano Viviano | Italy | Internazionale | Brescia | Renewed | |
| | Rej Volpato | Italy | Bari | Juventus | N.D. (Bari) | |
| 2009-06-26 | Francesco Volpe | Italy | Livorno | Juventus | Renewed | |
| 2009-06-25 | Massimo Volta | Italy | Sampdoria | Parma | Renewed | |
| | Roberto Zaina | Italy | Lumezzane | Brescia | ND | |
| 2009-06-26 | Marcelo Zalayeta | Uruguay | Napoli | Juventus | Renewed | |
| 26 June 2009 | Giacomo Zappacosta | Italy | Fiorentina | Pescara | Pescara | Auction, €67,000 |
| 25 June 2009 | Massimo Zappino | Italy | Foggia | Frosinone | ND (Foggia) | |
| 26 June 2009 | Marco Zentil | Italy | Sambenedettese | Vicenza | ND (Sambenedettese) | Free |
