= Michele Rinaldi (footballer, born 1987) =

Italian footballer

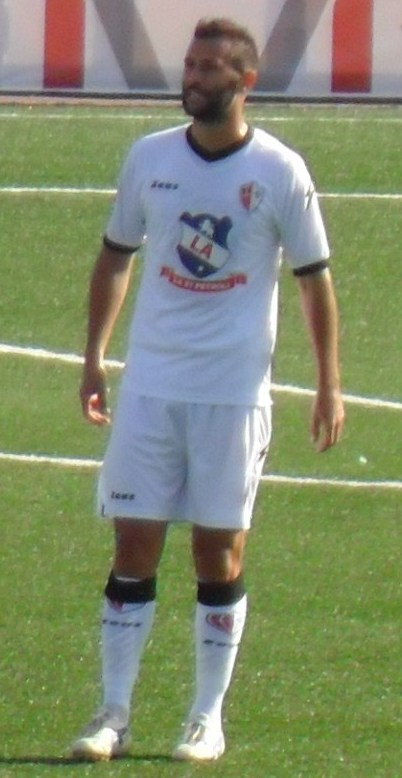

Personal information
- Date of birth: 9 January 1987 (age 39)
- Place of birth: Manerbio, Italy
- Height: 1.84 m (6 ft 0 in)
- Position: Defender

Team information
- Current team: Virtus
- Number: 5

Youth career
- 2004–2005: Atalanta
- 2005–2007: Udinese
- 2007: → Parma (loan)

Senior career*
| Years | Team | Apps | (Gls) |
| 2007–2008 | Udinese | 0 | (0) |
| 2007–2008 | → Rimini (loan) | 13 | (0) |
| 2008–2010 | Rimini | 44 | (2) |
| 2010–2011 | Bari | 6 | (0) |
| 2011–2013 | Benevento | 29 | (2) |
| 2013–2014 | Pavia | 15 | (0) |
| 2014 | Cuneo | 16 | (0) |
| 2014–2015 | Savoia | 14 | (1) |
| 2015 | → Prato (loan) | 14 | (0) |
| 2015–2016 | Cuneo | 32 | (2) |
| 2016–2017 | Gubbio | 35 | (5) |
| 2017–2018 | Arezzo | 19 | (3) |
| 2018–2019 | Viterbese | 48 | (3) |
| 2019–2020 | Feralpisalò | 21 | (0) |
| 2020–2022 | Imolese | 41 | (0) |
| 2022 | United Riccione | 15 | (2) |
| 2023 | Ravenna | 5 | (0) |
| 2023– | Virtus | 69 | (5) |

International career
| 2003 | Italy U-16 | 9 | (0) |
| 2003–2004 | Italy U-17 | 9 | (2) |
| 2004–2005 | Italy U-18 | 5 | (0) |
| 2005–2006 | Italy U-19 | 10 | (0) |
| 2006–2007 | Italy U-20 | 2 | (0) |
- * Club domestic league appearances and goals as of 25 June 2026

Michele Rinaldi (born 9 January 1987) is an Italian footballer who plays as a defender for Sanmarinese club Virtus. A right-footed defender, he is capable of playing both in the centre, or on the right.

== Club career ==
=== Early career ===
Born in Manerbio, in the Province of Brescia, Lombardy, Rinaldi started his career at Atalanta. In 2005 Udinese signed Rinaldi (loan), Marco Motta, Cesare Natali, Massimo Gotti, Piermario Morosini and Fausto Rossini from Atalanta, with Thomas Manfredini and Antonino D'Agostino moved to Bergamo. Rinaldi was a player of Udinese's reserve team.

On 9 August 2006, Rinaldi and Christian Tiboni were signed by Udinese in a co-ownership deal for €800,000 and €1.1 million, respectively, with Argentine midfielder Fernando Tissone moved to Bergamo also in a co-ownership deal for €1.5 million. In January 2007 Rinaldi was signed by Parma. However, he was only able to play for their reserve.

In June 2007 the co-ownerships were renewed.

=== Rimini ===
In July 2007, Rinaldi was signed by Rimini in a temporary deal. At the end of the season, Atalanta bought back Rinaldi and Tiboni for undisclosed fees, with Tissone returned to Udinese for €4.165 million. Rinaldi's residual contact value was also write-down immediately to €600,000 on 30 June 2008, in order to matching the loss of selling Rinaldi in 2008–09 season.

Rinaldi was immediately signed by Rimini in another co-ownership deal. The co-ownership was renewed again in June 2009 and June 2010. However, Rimini went bankrupt, making Rinaldi a free agent.

=== Bari ===
On 16 July 2010 Rinaldi was signed by A.S. Bari on a free transfer.

=== Lega Pro clubs ===
On 4 August 2011 Rinaldi was signed by Benevento in a 3-year contract. On 21 May 2013 he was released.

In summer 2013 he was signed by A.C. Pavia. In January 2014 he left for Cuneo in a 2 1/2-year deal. The club was relegated to 2014–15 Serie D.

In July 2014, he was signed by Lega Pro newcomer club Savoia. On 2 February 2015 Rinaldi left for A.C. Prato. Prato finished 14th, while Savona was relegated.

On 10 September 2015, Rinaldi returned to Cuneo. The club was promoted from 2014–15 Serie D.

On 12 July 2019, he signed with Feralpisalò.

On 11 September 2020 he moved to Imolese on a 2-year contract.
