= Marco Motta =

Italian footballer (born 1986)

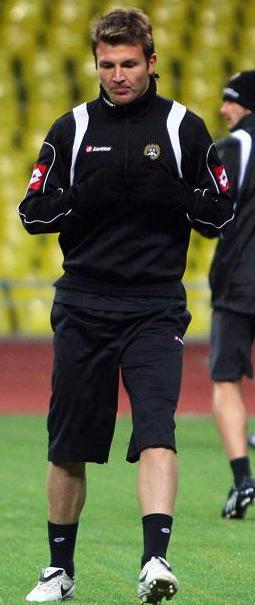
- Motta with Udinese in 2008

Personal information
- Full name: Marco Motta
- Date of birth: 14 May 1986 (age 40)
- Place of birth: Merate, Italy
- Height: 1.86 m (6 ft 1 in)
- Position: Right back

Youth career
- 2000–2004: Atalanta

Senior career*
Years	Team	Apps	(Gls)
2004–2005	Atalanta	19	(0)
2005–2009	Udinese	36	(1)
2007–2008	→ Torino (loan)	24	(1)
2009–2010	Roma	29	(0)
2010–2015	Juventus	24	(0)
2011–2012	→ Catania (loan)	13	(0)
2012–2013	→ Bologna (loan)	19	(1)
2014	→ Genoa (loan)	13	(0)
2015	Watford	9	(0)
2016	Charlton Athletic	12	(0)
2017–2018	Almería	46	(3)
2018–2019	Omonia	18	(0)
2020–2022	Persija Jakarta	26	(1)
Total		278	(7)

International career
2001–2002	Italy U16	3	(2)
2002–2003	Italy U17	14	(4)
2003	Italy U18	5	(0)
2003–2004	Italy U19	6	(0)
2004–2005	Italy U20	1	(0)
2005–2009	Italy U21	36	(1)
2008	Italy Olympic	2	(0)
2010	Italy	1	(0)
- * Club domestic league appearances and goals

Marco Motta (Italian pronunciation: [ˈmarko ˈmɔtta]; born 14 May 1986) is an Italian former professional footballer who played as a right back.

Motta is a former Italy international and made his senior international appearance in 2010; at youth level, he participated in the 2008 Summer Olympics with Italy.

== Club career ==
=== Atalanta ===
Born in Merate, Lombardy, Motta began his professional career with Lombardy side Atalanta B.C. in 2005, following his promotion from the club's youth setup. He was a member of the 2004–05 Primavera Under-20 squad, and made his Serie A debut on 9 January 2005, replacing Riccardo Montolivo in the 65th minute. On 13 January he was a starter in the Coppa Italia, ahead Damiano Zenoni, a match in which Juventus was eliminated in a 5–3 aggregate. Motta made 22 appearances (3 in the 2004–05 Coppa Italia) in the remainder of the season to replace the left of Zenoni who left on 1 February, but due to the club's relegation, he moved to Udinese Calcio in a co-ownership deal, for €2.05 million, prior to the start of the 2005–06 Serie A season. Udinese also signed several players from Bergamo, namely Fausto Rossini (50% for €450,000), Cesare Natali and young players Massimo Gotti, Piermario Morosini (50%), and Michele Rinaldi (loan); Simultaneously sending Thomas Manfredini and Antonino D'Agostino (50%) to Bergamo as part of the deal for a total of €2 million.

=== Udinese ===
Udinese Calcio officially signed the wing back during the summer transfer window of 2005, and in his first season with the club, Motta was very sparingly used. An understudy of Damiano Zenoni once again, he made six league appearances and netted one goal. He also made his European debut for Udinese, on 2 November 2005, substituting David Di Michele in the 73rd minute in a 3–4 defeat to Werder Bremen. On 30 January 2006, he was injured and ruled out for the remainder of season.

He remained in Udine for the 2006–07 Serie A season, as well, and he made 16 additional league appearances (all as starting XI) with his club. In June 2007, Udinese bought the remainder of his contract from Atalanta for an additional €800,000, but the player did not remain in Friuli for the 2007–08 campaign. Atalanta also signed Zlatan Muslimović from Udine as part-exchange deal.

On 28 July 2007, Torino announced the one-year loan signing of Motta from Udinese, re-joining former teammate Cesare Natali, who was sold to Turin weeks earlier. Mainly an understudy to Gianluca Comotto, he made 24 league appearances (14 as starting XI) for his club, also scoring his second career Serie A goal.

Following a successful loan period, the player returned to Udinese ahead of the 2008–09 Serie A season, due to the injury of Cristián Zapata (right-back or central back). At Udine, he completed the starting line-up with Damiano Ferronetti (who can play left or right back), Aleksandar Luković (who can play left or central back) and Giovanni Pasquale (left-back or winger). He played eight league matches as a starter out of fourteen Serie A appearances that season. But at UEFA Cup, he was the starting right back at the group stage and played all four matches, three as a starter, ahead of Ferronetti, who played the first round. Udinese finished first in Group D.

Since Udinese had signed Dušan Basta for the next season (who can play winger or right-back) and since Zapata recovered, he was loaned to A.S. Roma, agreed a 3 1/2-year deal, which he earned a gross salary (pre-tax income) of €300,000 for the remaining six months of 2008–09 season and increased to €660,000 in the 2009–10 season.

=== Roma ===
Motta made his debut for Roma on 8 February 2009, coming on as a substitute in the 31st minute in Roma's 3–0 victory against Genoa. He impressed both his new club's supporters and his new coach, Luciano Spalletti. In his various post-match press conferences with Roma Channel and Sky Italia, Spalletti said, "Motta gets my compliments for that performance. It's not easy to enter onto the field at the Olimpico for the first time in front of a crowd like ours, with whom it's difficult to exhibit tranquillity. He has great speed, force and technical quality, and he was very good in the defensive phase of the game. He played with great personality."

Motta then earned a starting position under Spalletti, beating off competition from the likes of Cicinho, Cristian Panucci, and Marco Cassetti. He also played both legs of UEFA Champions League round of 32 matches that lost to Arsenal.

With the loan deal, the capital club obtained the option to for the right to buy half of the player's contract in June for €3.5million or outright for €7million in three installments. On 24 June 2009 Roma exercised their right to sign half of Motta's contract for pre-agreed price. Following the resignation of Spalletti, and the appointment of Claudio Ranieri, Motta lost his place in the Roma first team, and failed to become a regular starter and made just 16 appearances during the entire 2009–10 Serie A season. At the conclusion of the season, the two clubs failed to agree price on him to negotiate the co-ownership and on 25 June 2010, the deal went to a blind auction (submit the bid by envelope). Udinese repurchased Motta after winning the auction on 26 June. for €1.45M.

=== Juventus ===
On 2 July 2010, Juventus agreed a loan deal for Motta with Udinese for the 2010–2011 season. Juventus had the option to sign Motta permanently at the end of the season, as Juventus was seeking a new right back to replace Martín Cáceres and Jonathan Zebina. Motta then joined the Juventus squad which they would leave from Vinovo, Juventus's facility located to Pinzolo, the camp site for pre-season training, in although the deal was pending a formal finalization. On 5 July, Juventus announced the deal was completed, which cost €1.25 million for the loan with option to make it permanent for a further €3.75 million. He made his official Juventus debut on 29 July 2010 in the 2010–11 UEFA Europa League qualifier against Shamrock Rovers, ahead of Zdeněk Grygera as right back. The Old Lady won the Ireland side 3–0 in aggregate. Grygera alter regained his starting place and Motta had to appear as an unused substitute on the bench for much of the 2010–11 Serie A campaign.

On 22 June 2011, Juventus exercised the rights to sign Motta along with Simone Pepe for a pre-agreed price. Following his permanent transfer to the club, he became a surplus to requirements under new coach Antonio Conte and failed to make any appearances for the club alongside the likes of Amauri, Luca Toni, and Vincenzo Iaquinta, all of whom were released during the 2012 winter transfer market on either loan deals or permanent transfers.

==== Loan deals ====
Motta joined Calcio Catania on a loan from Juventus on 30 January, one day before the end of the winter transfer period. His second league match for the club was coincidentally against his parent club, Juventus, and he was sent off 56 minutes into the match for a rash challenge on former teammate Paolo De Ceglie, having already been booked. Catania eventually lost the match, 3–1. He returned to Juventus on 30 June 2012 and was loaned to Bologna on 19 July from Juventus F.C. with an option to buy 50% of the player. Bologna did not exercise their option to purchase the player's registration rights, and he returned to Juventus once more. On 23 January 2014, he moved to Genoa on loan for the remainder of the 2013–14 season.

=== Watford ===
Having left Juventus, Motta completed a move to Championship side Watford on 26 February 2015. He made his debut in a 1–0 win against Fulham on 3 March 2015.

However, following Watford's promotion to the Barclays Premier League, Motta was released by the club.

=== Charlton ===
In January 2015 numerous reports stated that Motta was on the verge of a transfer to Queens Park Rangers.On 12 February 2016 Motta signed for Championship side Charlton Athletic on a deal until the end of the 2015–16 season. He was released at the end of the season.

=== Almería ===
On 31 January 2017, Motta signed a contract with Segunda División side UD Almería until 2019, after impressing on a trial basis. He scored his first goal for the club on 3 December, netting the opener in a 2–1 home defeat of CD Tenerife.

On 9 July 2018, after being an undisputed starter, Motta terminated his contract with Almería.

=== Omonia ===
On 11 July 2018, Motta agreed to a contract with Cypriot club AC Omonia. Motta missed the first half of the 2018-19 season because of a problem in the back and eventually debuted on 17 February 2019 against Anorthosis Famagusta. He finished the season with 8 league appearances and left the club in the end of June 2019.

=== Persija Jakarta ===
In February 2020, Motta signed a contract with Indonesian club in Liga 1 side Persija Jakarta on a 2-year contract, after playing in Cypriot First Division with AC Omonia.

Motta made his Persija Jakarta's debut in a pre-season 2020 East Java Governor Cup in a 4–1 win against Persela Lamongan on 11 February. and on 1 March, Motta made his league debut in a 3–2 win against Borneo at the Gelora Bung Karno Stadium. Then, 26 days later, this season was suspended on 27 March due to the COVID-19 pandemic. The season was abandoned and was declared void on 20 January 2021.

On 15 January 2022, Motta scored his first goal for the club, a late equaliser against Persela Lamongan at the Kapten I Wayan Dipta Stadium.

== International career ==
Since 2005, Motta has been a member of the Italy U-21 national team. In 2007, after the 2007 Euro U-21, he was named captain of the side. He also represented Italy at the 2008 Summer Olympics, 2003 UEFA European Under-17 Football Championship, 2006–07 Under-20 Four Nations Tournament, 2008 Toulon Tournament and 2009 UEFA European Under-21 Football Championship, he missed 2006 edition due to injury, where he played 4 out of possible 8 in qualifying since made his U21 debut.

On 22 March 2009, Motta received his first call up to the Italy national team for the games against Montenegro and the Republic of Ireland but remained an unused substitute.

He made his debut with the senior team on 10 August 2010, under new head coach Cesare Prandelli, in the friendly match lost 1–0 against Ivory Coast.

== Career statistics ==
=== Club ===
Club performance			League		Cup		Continental		Total	
Season	Club	League	Apps	Goals	Apps	Goals	Apps	Goals	Apps	Goals
Italy			League		Coppa Italia		Europe		Total	
2004–05	Atalanta	Serie A	19	0	3	0	0	0	22	0
2005–06	Udinese	Serie A	6	1	2	0	1	0	9	1
2006–07	Udinese	Serie A	16	0	0	0	0	0	16	0
2007–08	Torino	Serie A	24	1	1	0	0	0	25	1
2008–09^{1}	Udinese	Serie A	14	0	1	0	5	0	20	0
2008–09^{1}	Roma	Serie A	13	0	0	0	2	0	15	0
2009–10	Roma	Serie A	16	0	3	0	8	0	27	0
2010–11	Juventus	Serie A	22	0	2	0	8	0	32	0
2011–12^{2}	Juventus	Serie A	0	0	0	0	0	0	0	0
2011–12^{2}	Catania	Serie A	13	0	0	0	0	0	13	0
2012–13	Bologna	Serie A	19	1	3	0	0	0	22	1
2013–14	Juventus	Serie A	2	0	1	0	0	0	3	0
2014–15	Watford	Championship	9	0	0	0	0	0	9	0
2015–16	Charlton Athletic	Championship	12	0	0	0	0	0	12	0
2018–19	Omonia	First Division	2	0	0	0	0	0	2	0
2020–21	Persija Jakarta	Liga 1	2	0	0	0	0	0	2	0
2021–22	Persija Jakarta	Liga 1	23	1	0	0	0	0	23	0
Career total			190	3	16	0	24	0	229	3

Notes

* Note 1: Motta signed for Roma on loan during mid-season.

* Note 2: Motta signed for Catania on loan during mid-season. As of 31 December 2013

=== International ===
As of 10 August 2010

Italy
Year	Apps	Goals
2010	1	0
Total	1	0

== Honours ==
=== Club ===
Roma

- Serie A runner-up: 2009–10
- Coppa Italia runner-up: 2009–10

Juventus

- Serie A: 2013–14
- Supercoppa Italiana: 2013

Persija Jakarta

- Menpora Cup: 2021

=== International ===
Italy U21

- Toulon Tournament: 2008

=== Individual ===
- Menpora Cup Best Eleven: 2021
