= Fausto Rossini =

Italian footballer (born 1978)

Personal information
- Date of birth: 2 March 1978 (age 48)
- Place of birth: Grosseto, Italy
- Height: 1.88 m (6 ft 2 in)
- Position: Striker

Youth career
- ?–1998: Atalanta

Senior career*
Years	Team	Apps	(Gls)
1997–2005	Atalanta	104	(16)
1997	→ Nice (loan)	0	(0)
2003–2004	→ Bologna (loan)	13	(1)
2004–2005	→ Sampdoria (loan)	31	(2)
2005–2006	Udinese	14	(0)
2006–2007	Catania	16	(2)
2007–2009	Livorno	44	(10)
2010	Bellinzona	7	(0)
2010–2011	Como	9	(1)
Total		238	(32)

International career
1993	Italy U17	1	(0)
1998	Italy U21	2	(1)
- * Club domestic league appearances and goals

Fausto Rossini (born 2 March 1978) is an Italian former professional footballer who played as a striker.

== Career ==
=== Atalanta ===
Rossini started his career at Atalanta. In 2003, he joined Bologna along with Cesare Natali in a co-ownership deal, but bought back in June 2004. He then left on loan to Sampdoria, along with Vitali Kutuzov as the replacement of Fabio Bazzani.

=== Udinese ===
In June 2005, he left for Udinese for €450,000 in a co-ownership deal along with Atalanta teammates Marco Motta (50% for €2.05 million), Cesare Natali, Massimo Gotti, Piermario Morosini (50%) and Michele Rinaldi (loan), in exchange Atalanta signed Thomas Manfredini and Antonino D'Agostino (50%) for a total for €2 million. Along with Barreto, he played as a backup of Vincenzo Iaquinta, Antonio Di Natale and David Di Michele (Di Michele left the club in January 2006). He played once at 2005–06 UEFA Champions League group stage. He also played all four matches at 2005–06 UEFA Cup as the Udine club rested number of regular starter.

In June 2006, Udinese signed Rossini outright for free and Morosini for undisclosed amount; Atalanta also signed D'Agostino for free.

=== Catania & Livorno ===
On 3 August 2006, he joined Serie A newcomer Calcio Catania in a three-year deal for an undisclosed fee. He played 16 matches and left for Livorno in next season, to replace the left of flagship striker Cristiano Lucarelli. With presence of Diego Tristán and Francesco Tavano, Rossini played 20 league matches in the first season, while 15 of them were substitutes. Along with Tomas Danilevičius, they followed Livorno relegated to Serie B and played 16 starts in 24 league appearances, behind the starting pair Alessandro Diamanti and Tavano. He then released in June 2009.

=== Bellinzona & Como ===
On 2 February 2010, Swiss side AC Bellinzona announced the signing of Rossini, which located in Ticino, an Italian speaking region. He joined the Swiss Super League team on free transfer. On 31 August 2010, he signed a contract with Calcio Como after trailed with the club since July.
