= Cesare Natali =

Italian footballer (born 1979)

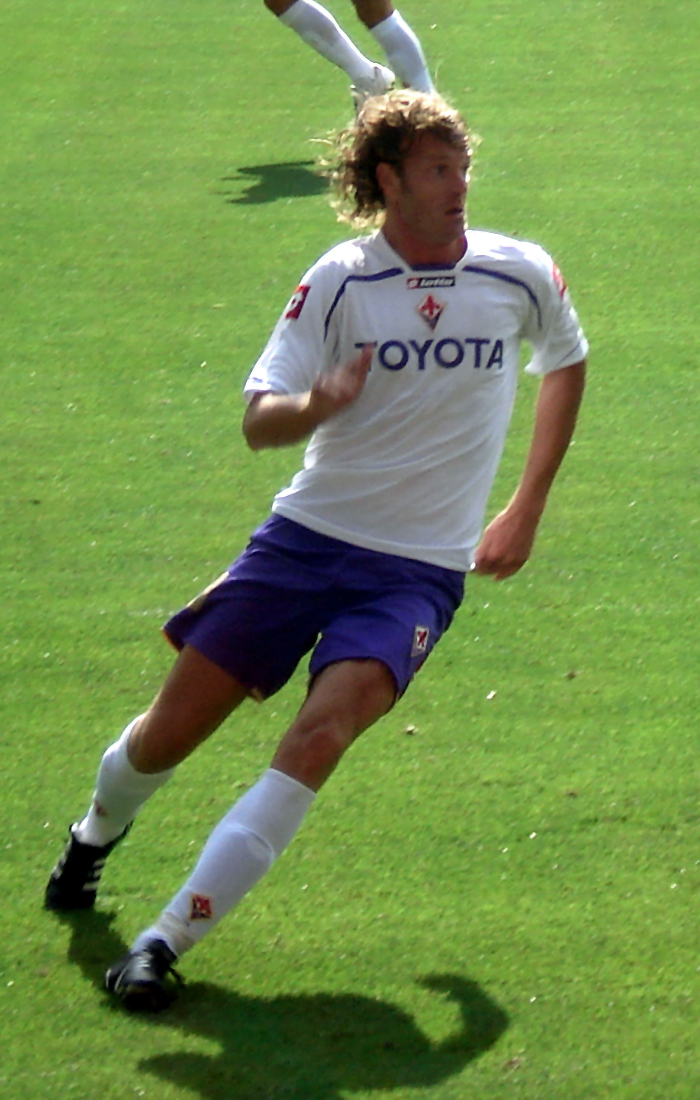
- Natali with Fiorentina in 2009

Personal information
- Date of birth: 5 April 1979 (age 47)
- Place of birth: Bergamo, Italy
- Height: 1.91 m (6 ft 3 in)
- Position: Centre-back

Youth career
- 1997–1998: Atalanta

Senior career*
Years	Team	Apps	(Gls)
1998–2005	Atalanta	69	(2)
1998–1999	→ Lecco (loan)	22	(1)
2001	→ Monza (loan)	11	(1)
2003–2004	→ Bologna (loan)	31	(0)
2005–2007	Udinese	51	(1)
2007–2009	Torino	50	(3)
2009–2012	Fiorentina	56	(2)
2012–2014	Bologna	37	(1)
2015	Sassuolo	3	(0)
Total		330	(11)

International career
2002	Italy U-21	3	(0)
- * Club domestic league appearances and goals

Cesare Natali (born 5 April 1979) is an Italian former professional footballer who played as a centre-back.

== Club career ==
=== Atalanta ===
Natali started his career at Atalanta. He scored the opening goal in the relegation playoffs second legs in June 2003, but Atalanta eventually lost 2–1 and relegated to Serie B. On 30 August 2003, Natali and Fausto Rossini were sold to Bologna in co-ownership deal. In June 2004, Natali and Rossini were re-signed by Atalanta. He was the regular of the team, partnered again with Gianpaolo Bellini and Luigi Sala.

Atalanta relegated again in June 2005.

=== Udinese ===
On 29 June 2005, he was signed by Udinese in a five-year contract, to rejoin teammate Piermario Morosini (50% for undisclosed fee), Massimo Gotti (undisclosed fee), Marco Motta (50% for €2.05 million), Fausto Rossini (50% for €450,000). However, Atalanta also signed Thomas Manfredini and Antonino D'Agostino from Udinese for a total of €2 million.

He was the regular of the team but suffered from fractured left ankle in September.

He made 32 starts during the 2006–07 season.

=== Torino ===
Since the signing of Aleksandar Luković, In July 2007, he was sold to Torino, signed a 4-year contract. He was the regular until injured in March 2008.

=== Fiorentina ===
On 4 July 2009, he was signed by ACF Fiorentina from relegated Torino, for €2.8 million, concurrently Torino signed Simone Loria as replacement. He signed a three-year contract.

On 20 October 2009, he played his first game for Fiorentina, at UEFA Champions League 2009–10 versus Debreceni VSC, replacing Dario Dainelli at half time. After the departure of Dainelli to Genoa in January, and the fitness problems of Alessandro Gamberini, Per Krøldrup and new signing Felipe, along with tactical rotation, he earned more chances to play, including the Champions league match against FC Bayern Munich.

Natali scored his first goal for Fiorentina on 29 January 2012, netting the second in a 2–1 victory over derby rivals Siena.

He scored his second soon after on 25 March against Genoa in the Stadio Luigi Ferraris. His header put Fiorentina 2–1 in front, however the match ended in a 2–2 draw.

=== Bologna ===
On 26 July 2012, Natali returned to Bologna for a second spell on a two-year contract.

=== Sassuolo ===
On 3 March 2015, he was signed by Sassuolo as a free agent.

== International career ==
Along with his Atalanta teammate Gianpaolo Bellini, Natali was called up to the Italy under-21 squad for the 2002 UEFA European Under-21 Football Championship. They partnered together in all three group matches (including one substitute appearance) at the tournament as Italy reached the semi-finals.

In March 2004, he made his only international appearance in the senior Italy national team, to replace injured Marcello Castellini.

== Career statistics ==
=== Club ===
Appearances and goals by club, season and competition
Club	Season	League			Coppa Italia		Europe		Other		Total	
Club	Season	Division	Apps	Goals	Apps	Goals	Apps	Goals	Apps	Goals	Apps	Goals
Lecco (loan)	1998–99	Serie C1	22	1	0	0	–		–		22	1
Atalanta	1999–00	Serie B	1	0	1	0	–		–		2	0
Atalanta	2000–01	Serie A	0	0	1	0	–		–		1	0
Atalanta	2001–02	Serie A	7	0	2	0	–		–		9	0
Atalanta	2002–03	Serie A	27	1	1	0	–		2 (Note: Appearances in Serie A relegation play-offs)	1	30	2
Atalanta	2004–05	Serie A	34	1	5	0	–		–		39	1
Atalanta	Total		69	2	10	0	0	0	2	1	81	3
Monza (loan)	2000–01	Serie B	11	1	0	0	–		–		11	1
Bologna (loan)	2003–04	Serie A	31	0	0	0	–		–		31	0
Udinese	2005–06	Serie A	19	1	3	0	5	1	–		27	2
Udinese	2006–07	Serie A	32	0	3	1	–		–		35	1
Udinese	Total		51	1	6	1	5	1	0	0	62	3
Torino	2007–08	Serie A	24	1	3	0	–		–		27	1
Torino	2008–09	Serie A	26	2	3	1	–		–		29	3
Torino	Total		50	3	6	1	0	0	0	0	56	4
Fiorentina	2009–10	Serie A	14	0	4	0	3	0	–		21	0
Fiorentina	2010–11	Serie A	16	0	0	0	–		–		16	0
Fiorentina	2011–12	Serie A	26	2	2	0	–		–		28	2
Fiorentina	Total		56	2	6	0	3	0	0	0	65	2
Bologna	2012–13	Serie A	5	0	0	0	–		–		5	0
Bologna	2013–14	Serie A	32	1	1	0	–		–		33	1
Bologna	Total		37	1	1	0	0	0	0	0	38	1
Sassuolo	2014–15	Serie A	3	0	0	0	–		–		3	0
Career total			330	11	29	2	8	1	2	1	364	15
