= Thomas Manfredini =

Italian footballer

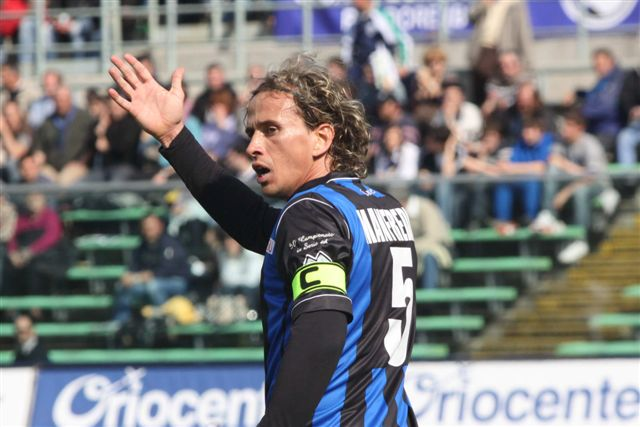
- Manfredini with Atalanta in 2010

Personal information
- Date of birth: 27 May 1980 (age 46)
- Place of birth: Ferrara, Italy
- Height: 1.80 m (5 ft 11 in)
- Position: Centre-back

Team information
- Current team: SP La Fiorita (manager)

Senior career*
Years	Team	Apps	(Gls)
1997–1999	SPAL	14	(0)
1999–2005	Udinese	64	(2)
2004	→ Fiorentina (loan)	11	(0)
2004–2005	→ Catania (loan)	30	(3)
2005–2013	Atalanta	134	(4)
2005–2006	→ Rimini (loan)	22	(0)
2006–2007	→ Bologna (loan)	28	(2)
2013–2014	Genoa	29	(0)
2014–2015	Sassuolo	3	(0)
2015–2016	Vicenza	14	(0)
2018–2019	La Fiorita	2	(0)

International career
2000	Italy U20	5	(0)
2000	Italy U21	1	(0)

Managerial career
- 2022–2024: La Fiorita
- 2024–: Lunano
- * Club domestic league appearances and goals

Thomas Manfredini (born 27 May 1980) is an Italian football manager and former professional footballer who played as a centre-back. He was a part of the Italian Under-21 team.

== Playing career ==
=== Atalanta ===
Manfredini was signed by Serie B club Atalanta BC on 27 June 2005 for €1.2 million. That week Atalanta also signed half of the registration rights of D'Agostino for €800,000, as well as sold half of the registration rights of Marco Motta and Fausto Rossini to Udinese for €2.05 million and €450,000 respectively, as well as Cesare Natali, Piermario Morosini (50%) and Massimo Gotti for undisclosed fees.

In July 2007, he (along with three other players) was banned from football for a duration of three months as a result of illegal betting.

In October 2008, Manfredini extended his contract with Atalanta to June 2013.

On 26 July 2010, he signed with the newly relegated Serie B side, to remain under contract until 2013 with an option to extend to 30 June 2014. Teammate Gianpaolo Bellini also signed a contract on the same day.

On 9 August 2011, it was announced that Manfredini had again been banned from football for three years for his role in match fixing during the 2010–11 season (2011 Italian football scandal). In the appeal of Corte di Giustizia Federale of FIGC, Manfredini was acquitted of the charge.

=== Genoa ===
In January 2013, Manfredini left Atalanta and joined Genoa, in a swap deal involving 50% registration rights of Michele Canini. Manfredini was valued at €1.25 million, while 50% registration rights of Canini were valued at €1 million.

=== Sassuolo ===
In January 2014, Manfredini left Genoa and joined Sassuolo for €900,000 in a 2 1/2-year contract. That window the club also signed Davide Biondini from Genoa in a temporary deal.

=== Vicenza ===
On 12 January 2015, Manfredini signed for Vicenza on loan from Sassuolo until the end of the season. He took no.17 shirt from departing Niko Bianconi. On 30 June 2015, Vicenza signed Manfredini outright in a two-year contract, with Giovanni Sbrissa and became a player of Sassuolo in the 2016–17 season. He changed to wear no.5 in 2015–16 season.

On 25 August 2016, he was released.

=== La Fiorita ===
Manfredini came out of retirement in the 2018–19 season and joined La Fiorita. He retired in the subsequent season.

== Managerial career ==
Manfredini managed SP La Fiorita in the San Marino domestic league Campionato Sammarinese from 31 December 2022 until 31 July 2024. Under his management, they finished 3rd in the league in his first season in charge. In the subsequent year, the 2023–24 season, La Fiorita finished in second place and also won the Coppa Titano.

On 17 October 2024, he was appointed as Manager for Promozione side Lunano Calcio in Italy.
