= Beniamino Iraci =

Italian footballer (born 1989)

Personal information
- Date of birth: February 3, 1989 (age 37)
- Place of birth: Palermo, Italy
- Height: 1.71 m (5 ft 7 in)
- Position: Midfielder

Youth career
- Bari

Senior career*
Years	Team	Apps	(Gls)
2005–	Bari	0	(0)
2006–2007	→ Barletta (loan)	30	(0)
2007–2008	→ Noicattaro (loan)	16	(1)
2008–2009	→ Paganese (loan)	25	(0)
2009–2010	→ Taranto (loan)	2	(0)
2010	→ Potenza (loan)	12	(0)
- * Club domestic league appearances and goals as of 18:39, 7 May 2010 (UTC)

Beniamino Iraci (in other sources as Benedetto Iraci; born February 3, 1989) is an Italian professional football player.

== See also ==
- Football in Italy
- List of football clubs in Italy
