= Paolo Rossi (disambiguation) =

Paolo Rossi (1956–2020) was an Italian association football player and 1982 FIFA World Cup winner.

Paolo Rossi may also refer to:

- Paolo Alberto Rossi (1887–1969), Italian diplomat
- Paolo Rossi (politician) (1900–1985), Italian lawyer and politician
- Paolo Rossi (actor) (born 1953), Italian actor and comedian
- Paolo Rossi (footballer, born 1982), Italian football forward
- Paolo Rossi, former bassist of Fleshgod Apocalypse

== See also ==
- Rossi (surname)
- Paolo Rossi Monti, Italian philosopher
