= Strambelli =

Strambelli is an Italian surname. Notable people with the surname include:

- Nicola Strambelli (born 1988), Italian footballer
- Nicoletta Strambelli (born 1948), better known as Patty Pravo, Italian singer
