= Luca Pompilio =

Italian footballer

Personal information
- Full name: Luca Umberto Pompilio
- Date of birth: 16 March 1992 (age 34)
- Place of birth: Foggia, Italy
- Height: 1.73 m (5 ft 8 in)
- Position: Forward

Youth career
- –2005: Gioventu Calcio Foggia
- –2010: Lecce
- 2010–2011: Varese

Senior career*
Years	Team	Apps	(Gls)
2011–2013	Varese	1	(0)
2012	→ Foggia (loan)	9	(2)
2012–2013	→ Pavia (loan)	3	(0)
2013	Juve Stabia	0	(0)
2015–2016	Manfredonia	9	(1)
2016–2017	Melfi	12	(2)
2017	Foggia	3	(0)

International career
2007–2008	Italy U16 (Note: Pompilio received a call-up to a friendly tournament in March 2008, however the archive of Italian Football Federation did not have the record of the matches (Ireland, Turkey, Malta), thus his cap for the under-16 team was at least 2, as indicated by the archive, and a (unused?) substitute appearance against Turkey, as indicated by Turkish Football Federation.)	2	(0)
2008	Italy U17	2	(0)
2011	Italy U19	1	(0)
2012	Italy U20	1	(0)
- * Club domestic league appearances and goals

Luca Umberto Pompilio (born 16 March 1992) is an Italian footballer.

== Biography ==
Born in Foggia, Apulia region of southern Italy, Pompilio was a player of Lecce, such as a member of the reserve team in 2008–09 season. He also played for Giovanissimi B team in 2006–07 season, despite usually played by under-14 players. Pompilio was signed by third division Varese in January 2010, where he followed the northern Italy club promoted to the second division of Italy. He made his Serie B debut on 9 April 2011 against Grosseto. In January 2012 Pompilio left for Foggia in temporary deal with option to purchase, re-joining teammate Renan Wagner. In June 2012 Varese bought back Pompilio. On 31 August, the last day of transfer windows, he was signed by Pavia in temporary deal. On 31 January 2013 he was signed by Juve Stabia in another co-ownership deal. In June Varese gave up the remain 50% registration rights of Pompilio and Giuseppe Figliomeni to Juve Stabia. On 29 June 2013 Juve Stabia released Pompilio and Marco Gorzegno.
