= Giacinto Allegrini =

Italian footballer

Personal information
- Date of birth: 4 September 1989 (age 37)
- Place of birth: Carbonara, Italy
- Height: 1.80 m (5 ft 11 in)
- Position: Centre back

Team information
- Current team: Virtus Francavilla

Youth career
- 2001–2007: Bari

Senior career*
Years	Team	Apps	(Gls)
2007–2010	Bari	8	(0)
2008–2009	→ Noicattaro (loan)	25	(0)
2009–2010	→ Gubbio (loan)	19	(0)
2010–2012	Valenzana	39	(0)
2012–2013	Monopoli	28	(1)
2013–2014	Bisceglie	25	(0)
2014–2015	Fidelis Andria	17	(2)
2015–2016	Nardò	26	(0)
2016–2017	Fidelis Andria	24	(0)
2017–2019	Audace Cerignola	42	(0)
2019–2020	Taranto	14	(0)
2020–2024	Audace Cerignola	91	(3)
2024–	Virtus Francavilla	0	(0)
- * Club domestic league appearances and goals as of 5 May 2024

Giacinto Allegrini (born 4 September 1989) is an Italian footballer who plays as a centre back for Serie D club Virtus Francavilla.

== Career ==
He played the 2009–2010 season for Lega Pro Seconda Divisione team Gubbio on loan from Bari. In July 2016, he joined Andria on a free transfer. But on 6 December 2017, he terminates his contract with the club to join Audace Cerignola until the end of the season.

He won the promotion to Serie C with Audace Cerignola in 2021-22 season.
