= Ivan Loseto =

Italian footballer (born 1988)

Personal information
- Date of birth: 23 February 1988 (age 38)
- Place of birth: Bari, Italy
- Height: 1.73 m (5 ft 8 in)
- Position: Left back

Youth career
- Bari

Senior career*
Years	Team	Apps	(Gls)
2007–2010	Bari	19	(0)
2008	→ Sambenedettese (loan)	4	(0)
2008–2009	→ Verona (loan)	1	(0)
2009–2010	→ Noicattaro (loan)	25	(0)
2010–2012	Gavorrano	13	(1)

International career
2007	Italy U-19	1	(0)
- * Club domestic league appearances and goals

Ivan Loseto (born 23 February 1988) is an Italian footballer.

== Biography ==
Born on 23 February 1988, in Bari, Loseto started his career at A.S. Bari. In 2006–07 Serie B he entered the first team wearing no.29 shirt. In 2007–08 Serie B he changed to wear no.5 vacated by Massimiliano Scaglia. However, after the signing of Palmiro Di Dio, Loseto had to wear no.29 shirt again. In January 2008, he left for Serie C1 club Sambenedettese. In July, he remained in the same division for Hellas Verona F.C. In the 2009–10 season, he left for fourth division club Noicattaro, which Bari also paid part of the wage of Loseto for €20,000 in order to facilitate the deal. In summer 2010, he left for Gavorrano in 2-year contract. He also played for the club in 2011 pre-season, however he never played competitively in 2011–12 Lega Pro Seconda Divisione.
