= Alessandro Armenise =

Italian footballer (born 1984)

Personal information
- Full name: Alessandro Armenise
- Date of birth: 23 October 1984 (age 42)
- Place of birth: Pisa, Italy
- Height: 1.81 m (5 ft 11 1/2 in)
- Position: Defender

Senior career*
Years	Team	Apps	(Gls)
2001–2003	Bari	6	(0)
2003–2004	Teramo	17	(0)
2004–2005	Viterbese	27	(0)
2005–2006	Virtus Lanciano	23	(2)
2006–2007	A.S. Andria BAT	16	(0)
2007–2008	A.C. Martina	5	(0)
2008	Noicattaro	13	(0)
2008–2009	Catanzaro	?	(?)
2009–2011	Varese	42	(1)
2011–2012	Pro Vercelli	28	(0)
2012–2013	Cremonese	10	(0)
2013–2014	Prato	6	(0)
2014–2015	Paganese	19	(0)
- * Club domestic league appearances and goals

Alessandro Armenise (born 23 October 1984) is an Italian footballer. He plays as a defender.
