= Marco Valtulina =

Italian footballer (born 1988)

Personal information
- Date of birth: 3 March 1988 (age 38)
- Place of birth: Lecco, Italy
- Height: 1.76 m (5 ft 9 in)
- Position: Winger

Team information
- Current team: FC Lesmo Monza

Youth career
- 1998–2002: Internazionale
- 2002–2008: Pro Sesto

Senior career*
Years	Team	Apps	(Gls)
2007–2009	Pro Sesto	34	(4)
2009–2010	SPAL	19	(0)
2010–2011	Juve Stabia	15	(1)
2011–2012	Lecco	8	(1)
2012–2014	Pro Sesto	43	(3)
2014–2016	Legnano		
2016–2019	Nuova Sondrio Calcio	19	(3)
2019–2020	USD Cisanese		
2020–2022	ASD Vis Nova Giussano	53	(11)
2023	USD Mariano Calcio		
2023–2025	Meda		
2025–	FC Lesmo Monza		

International career
2008–2009	Italy U20 Lega Pro	3	(0)
- * Club domestic league appearances and goals as of 10 February 2026

Marco Valtulina (born 3 March 1988) is an Italian footballer who plays as a winger for FC Lesmo Monza.

== Biography ==
Born in Lecco, Lombardy, Valtulina started his professional career at Pro Sesto. Since 2004–05 season he played for its top youth team, Berretti. He also played for F.C. Internazionale Milano in his early career, but as a defender. He was a member of Giovanissimi Regionali under-14 team in 2001–02 season.

After a season with the first team of Pro Sesto with 12 appearances, he was signed by Serie B club Torino in co-ownership deal for undisclosed fee. As part of the deal, Serhiy Predko joined Pro Sesto, also in co-ownership deal for undisclosed fee. He returned to Sesto San Giovanni on loan in 2008–09 season.

In June 2009 Torino acquired the remain 50% registration rights. He then sold to SPAL in another co-ownership deal for undisclosed fee in July 2009. He played 19 times in his third season in the third division. In June 2010, Valtulina returned to Turin. Valtulina joined Juve Stabia in July 2010, yet another co-ownership deal, signing a multi-year contract. He only played 15 games for the promotion playoffs winner. In June 2011 Torino gave up the remain registration rights to Juve Stabia and in July 2011 released by the Serie B newcomer.

=== International career ===
Valtulina had played for Italy Lega Pro representative teams in 2007–09 International Challenge Trophy, against Finland. He also played in 2008–09 Mirop Cup. In February 2009 he received a call-up from Italy Universiade team to prepare for the event, but he did not enter the final squad. He also dropped from the training camp in March.

== Honours ==
- Campionato Nazionale Dante Berretti: 2008 (Pro Sesto youth)
- Coppa Italia Lega Pro: 2011 (Juve Stabia)
