= Mirko Guadalupi =

Italian footballer

Personal information
- Date of birth: 9 February 1987 (age 39)
- Place of birth: Brindisi, Italy
- Height: 1.84 m (6 ft 0 in)
- Position: Midfielder

Youth career
- Siena
- Torino

Senior career*
Years	Team	Apps	(Gls)
2005–2007	Perugia	35	(5)
2007–2011	Siena	0	(0)
2008–2009	→ Ancona (loan)	0	(0)
2010	→ Viareggio (loan)	10	(3)
2010–2011	→ Pavia (loan)	32	(3)
2011–2012	Brindisi	29	(6)
2012–2013	Nuova Cosenza	29	(10)
2013–2014	Messina	13	(0)
2014	Martina Franca	10	(1)
2014–2015	Bisceglie	31	(0)
2015–2016	Pomigliano	26	(3)
2016–2017	Gravina	91	(5)
2017	Bisceglie	0	(0)
2017–2018	Potenza	24	(1)
2018–2021	Team Altamura	81	(22)
2021	Bitonto	11	(1)
2021–2022	Molfetta	20	(4)
- * Club domestic league appearances and goals

Mirko Guadalupi (born 9 February 1987) is an Italian footballer. He plays as a midfielder.

== Club career ==
On 5 July 2018, he joined Serie D club Team Altamura.
