= Emanuele Orlandi =

Italian footballer (born 1988)

Personal information
- Full name: Emanuele Orlandi
- Date of birth: 4 February 1988 (age 38)
- Place of birth: Milan, Italy
- Height: 1.78 m (5 ft 10 in)
- Position: Striker

Team information
- Current team: Carrarese

Youth career
- Milan

Senior career*
Years	Team	Apps	(Gls)
2008–2010	Carpenedolo	60	(3)
2010–	Carrarese	2	(0)
Total		62	(3)
- * Club domestic league appearances and goals as of 5 September 2010

Emanuele Orlandi (born 4 February 1988) is an Italian professional footballer who plays for Prima Divisione club Carrarese. On 30 October 2011 he scores the first hattrick of his professional career against Piacenza Calcio.
