= Nicola Strambelli =

Italian footballer

Nicola Strambelli (il mago)
Personal information
- Date of birth: 6 September 1988 (age 38)
- Place of birth: Bari, Italy
- Height: 1.68 m (5 ft 6 in)
- Position: Midfielder

Team information
- Current team: Unione Sportiva Squinzano
- Number: 22

Youth career
- –2006: Bari

Senior career*
| Years | Team | Apps | (Gls) |
| 2006–2010 | Bari | 20 | (1) |
| 2008–2009 | → Sorrento (loan) | 14 | (0) |
| 2009 | → Andria BAT (loan) | 10 | (0) |
| 2009–2010 | → Taranto (loan) | 1 | (0) |
| 2010 | → Noicattaro (loan) | 9 | (2) |
| 2011–2013 | Monopoli | 37 | (9) |
| 2013–2016 | Fidelis Andria | 64 | (15) |
| 2016–2018 | Matera | 58 | (9) |
| 2018–2019 | Potenza | 16 | (1) |
| 2019 | Reggina | 18 | (3) |
| 2019–2020 | Lecco | 17 | (4) |
| 2020–2021 | Molfetta | 26 | (17) |
| 2021–2022 | Arezzo | 16 | (9) |
| 2022 | Cerignola | 10 | (1) |
| 2022–2023 | Casarano | 30 | (8) |
| 2023–2024 | Fidelis Andria | 29 | (8) |
| 2024-2025 | Barletta | 6 | (5) |
| 2025-2026 | Canosa | 17 | (5) |
| 2026- | Squinzano | 10 | (3) |
- * Club domestic league appearances and goals

Nicola Strambelli (born 6 September 1988) is an Italian professional footballer who plays for Squinzano. He is nicknamed "the magician" by his fans for his freekicks.

== Club career ==
In March 2008 he added one more year to his contract with Bari to last until 30 June 2011.

In July 2013 he was acquitted from match-fixing.

On 15 January 2019 he signed a 1.5-year contract with Reggina. On 2 September 2019 his Reggina contract was dissolved by mutual consent.

On 4 October 2019, he signed a one-year contract with Lecco.

On 27 July 2021 he joined Arezzo, freshly relegated to Serie D.

On 18 July 2022, Strambelli moved to Casarano.

On 24 July 2025 he joined A. S. D. Canosa Calcio 1948.

After only 5 months, Nicola decides to rescind his contract to go to Squinzano Calcio 1913, in Promozione Apulia. He tried to win the league with his team, but the first place was taken by Ostuni Calcio 24, that went in Eccellenza.
