= Samuele Pizza =

Italian footballer

Personal information
- Date of birth: 5 September 1988 (age 38)
- Place of birth: Viareggio, Italy
- Height: 1.82 m (6 ft 0 in)
- Position: Midfielder

Youth career
- Empoli

Senior career*
Years	Team	Apps	(Gls)
2008–2009	Empoli	0	(0)
2008–2009	→ Monza (loan)	21	(0)
2009–2014	Viareggio	134	(9)
2014	→ Avellino (loan)	6	(2)
2014–2015	Torres	18	(0)
2015	Lucchese	13	(1)
2015–2016	Pontedera	10	(0)
2016–2017	US Real Forte	37	(3)
2017–2018	AC Fucecchio	23	(0)
Total		262	(15)

International career
2006	Italy U19	2	(0)
- * Club domestic league appearances and goals

Samuele Pizza (born 5 September 1988) is an Italian former professional footballer who played as a midfielder.

== Club career ==
Born in Viareggio, Pizza finished his youth formation with Empoli, and after a loan stint at Monza he joined Esperia Viareggio.

On 29 January 2014 Pizza was loaned to Serie B side Avellino until June. On 8 February he made his division debut, coming on as a late substitute in a 1–1 draw at Ternana.
