= Ivan Piccoli =

Italian footballer

Personal information
- Date of birth: April 3, 1981 (age 45)
- Place of birth: Fano, Italy
- Height: 1.87 m (6 ft 1 1/2 in)
- Position: Midfielder

Team information
- Current team: Santarcangelo

Senior career*
| Years | Team | Apps | (Gls) |
| 1998–2008 | Cesena | 141 | (12) |
| 2002 | → Faenza (loan) | 12 | (1) |
| 2008 | → Ancona (loan) | 9 | (5) |
| 2008–2010 | Ancona | 16 | (0) |
| 2010–2012 | Fano | 48 | (16) |
| 2013– | Santarcangelo | 10 | (7) |
- * Club domestic league appearances and goals

Ivan Piccoli (born 3 April 1981) is an Italian professional footballer who plays for Santarcangelo.

In January 2008 he was loaned to Ancona. He was signed outright in June.

After Ancona was expelled from professional league, he joined Fano on 6 December 2010.
