= Lorenzo Poli =

Italian footballer

Personal information
- Date of birth: 23 January 1990 (age 36)
- Place of birth: Rome, Italy
- Positions: Defender; midfielder

Youth career
- Roma

Senior career*
Years	Team	Apps	(Gls)
2008–2009	Roma	0	(0)
2008–2009	→ Vibonese (loan)	5	(0)
2009–2010	Benevento	1	(0)
2009–2010	→ Cassino (loan)	2	(0)
2010–2011	Villacidrese	26	(0)
- * Club domestic league appearances and goals

Lorenzo Poli (born 23 January 1990) is an Italian professional footballer.

== Biography ==
He made his professional debut in the 2008/09 season in Lega Pro Seconda Divisione for U.S. Vibonese Calcio. In January 2009 he was sold to Benevento in co-ownership deal and the club acquired him outright in June 2009. In summer 2009 he was loaned to Cassino and returned to Benevento in January 2010.
