= Shadi Ghosheh =

Italian footballer

Personal information
- Date of birth: 5 December 1987 (age 38)
- Place of birth: Rome, Italy
- Height: 1.82 m (6 ft 0 in)
- Position: Centre back

Youth career
- AS Urbetevere Calcio
- 2004–2005: → Rosetana (loan)
- 2005: → Messina (loan)
- 2005–2007: Messina
- 2006–2007: → Cisco Roma (loan)

Senior career*
Years	Team	Apps	(Gls)
2007–2008	Messina	0	(0)
2007–2008	→ Igea Virtus (loan)	31	(0)
2008–2013	Bassano	93	(3)
2009–2010	→ Alessandria (loan)	26	(1)
2013–2014	Delta Porto Tolle	17	(0)
2014	Pro Vercelli	3	(0)
2014–2015	Venezia	17	(0)
2015	Catanzaro	15	(1)
2015–2016	Monopoli	3	(0)
2017	Racing Fondi	0	(0)
2018–2019	SSD Spoleto Calcio		
2019	Pomezia	4	(0)
2020	Tamai	5	(0)
2020–2021	SS Scardovari		
2021–2022	ASD Liventina		
2022	Unione La Rocca Altavilla		
2022–2023	ACD Virtus Cornedo		
Total		214	(5)
- * Club domestic league appearances and goals

Shadi Ghosheh (born 5 December 1987) is a former footballer who plays as a centre back. Born in Italy, he is of Tunisian and Jordanian descent.

== Club career ==
=== Youth career ===
Born in Rome, capital of Italy, Ghosheh started his career at Rome club AS Urbetevere Calcio. He left for Rosetana in 2004–05 season, played in Berretti under-20 team. In January 2005 he left for Messina. The club signed him outright at the end of season. In 2006–07 season, he left for Cisco Roma's Berretti team.

=== Lega Pro clubs ===
In mid-2007 he left for Igea Virtus. After Messina bankrupted, he became free agent In July he left for Chievo and sold to Bassano in co-ownership deal for a peppercorn fee of €500. Ghosheh made his non-competitive debut on 25 July

In June 2011 Bassano bought the remain 50% registration rights from Chievo for €15,000. Ghosheh also signed a new 2-year contract.

In 2013–14 to 2014–15 season he played for 4 Lega Pro clubs, namely Delta Porto Tolle, Pro Vercelli, Venezia and Catanzaro.

On 4 September 2015 Ghosheh was signed by Monopoli.
