= Gianni Fabiano =

Italian footballer

Personal information
- Date of birth: 9 July 1984 (age 42)
- Place of birth: Milan, Italy
- Height: 1.71 m (5 ft 7 in)
- Positions: Attacking midfielder; winger

Team information
- Current team: Mestre

Senior career*
Years	Team	Apps	(Gls)
2003	Meda	1	(0)
2003–2004	Canzese	29	(4)
2004–2005	Como	16	(1)
2005–2007	Carpenedolo	44	(6)
2007–2008	Parma	0	(0)
2007–2008	→ Carpenedolo (loan)	27	(5)
2008–2010	Bassano	57	(16)
2010–2011	Carpi	20	(4)
2011–2015	Pro Vercelli	80	(6)
2015–2019	Venezia	59	(7)
2019–	Mestre	16	(3)
- * Club domestic league appearances and goals as of 21:05, 10 March 2020 (UTC)

Gianni Fabiano (born 9 July 1984) is an Italian footballer who plays as a midfielder for Serie D club A.C. Mestre.

== Career ==
Born in Milan, Lombardy, Fabiano started his professional career at Meda. He then spent 1 season with Serie D team Canzese.

In 2004, he was signed by Serie C1 club Como.

In 2007, he was signed by Parma along with Alessandro Wilson, Alessio Tombesi and Manuel Pascali. He was loaned back to Carpenedolo. In summer 2008, he was signed by Bassano in co-ownership deal.

In 2010, he was signed by Carpi. From 2011 to 2015 he played in the Pro Vercelli; in the summer of 2015 he moved to Venezia.
