= Alessandro Osso =

Italian footballer (born 1987)

Personal information
- Full name: Alessandro Osso Armellino
- Date of birth: 5 May 1987 (age 39)
- Place of birth: San Daniele del Friuli, Italy
- Position: Midfielder

Team information
- Current team: San Daniele

Youth career
- –2007: Udinese

Senior career*
Years	Team	Apps	(Gls)
2006–2009	Udinese	0	(0)
2008	→ Paganese (loan)	11	(1)
2008–2009	→ Celano (loan)	8	(0)
2009	Colligiana	6	(0)
2009–2011	Manzanese	32	(6)
2012–2014	San Daniele		
- * Club domestic league appearances and goals

Alessandro Osso Armellino (born 5 May 1987) is an Italian footballer who plays for San Daniele.

== Biography ==
Born in San Daniele del Friuli, the Province of Udine, Friuli sub-region, Osso made his first team debut on 16 March 2006, replacing Mirko Pieri in the last minute. The match Udinese was defeated by Levski Sofia 1–2 and was eliminated from 2005–06 UEFA Cup round of 16. He wore no.42 shirt that season. In the next season, he wore no.87 shirt. In 2007–08 season he changed to wear no.75.

In January 2008, he was loaned to Paganese along with Albin Hodza. He left for Celano in July 2008.

On 2 February 2009, he left for Colligiana in co-ownership deal. In June 2009, Colligiana acquired him outright, but he soon left for Serie D club Manzanese along with Udinese player Giovanni Barreca. After the relegation of the club, Alessandro Osso remained and play along with Andrea Osso.

In 2012–13 season he was a player of a local club in San Daniele del Friuli for the Eccellenza league (regional league). In 2013–14 season, Andrea re-joined Alessandro at San Daniele.
