= Franco Chiavarini =

Argentine footballer

Personal information
- Date of birth: 18 February 1980 (age 46)
- Place of birth: Santa Fe, Argentina
- Height: 1.86 m (6 ft 1 in)
- Position: Forward

Senior career*
| Years | Team | Apps | (Gls) |
| 2002 | Unión de Santa Fe | | |
| 2002–2003 | Carpi | 20 | (2) |
| 2003–2004 | Sangiovannese | 0 | (0) |
| 2004–2005 | Ferentino | 7 | (0) |
| 2005–2006 | Pisoniano | 32 | (11) |
| 2006–2008 | Triestina | 0 | (0) |
| 2006–2007 | → Viterbese (loan) | 31 | (6) |
| 2007–2008 | → Bellaria (loan) | 29 | (10) |
| 2008–2012 | Cesena | 22 | (5) |
| 2011 | → Zagreb (loan) | 11 | (2) |
| 2011–2012 | → South Tyrol (loan) | 20 | (1) |
- * Club domestic league appearances and goals

Franco Chiavarini (born 18 February 1980) is an Argentine footballer.

== Career ==
He has spent the majority of his career playing in the lower divisions of Italian football.

In 2007, he joined Bellaria–Igea along with Juanito. In June 2008 he was acquired by A.C. Cesena in co-ownership deal for €275,000 and co-currently Triestina acquired Cristian Cristea for €225,000. Chiavarini only played for Cesena in 2008–09 Lega Pro Prima Divisione. He did not play in 2009–10 Serie B nor 2010–11 Serie A.

He was loaned out to NK Zagreb in January 2011.

On 22 August 2011 he was signed by South Tyrol in another temporary deal.

In December 2012 he returned to Argentina for Atlético Paraná on trial.
