= Stefano Garzon =

Italian footballer

Personal information
- Date of birth: 23 December 1981 (age 44)
- Place of birth: Cerea, Italy
- Height: 1.78 m (5 ft 10 in)
- Position: Midfielder

Youth career
- Chievo

Senior career*
Years	Team	Apps	(Gls)
1999–2008	Chievo	1	(0)
2000–2001	→ Cremonese (loan)	23	(1)
2001–2002	→ Pavia (loan)	28	(1)
2002	→ Alessandria (loan)	14	(0)
2003	→ Varese (loan)	12	(0)
2003–2004	→ Acireale (loan)	29	(3)
2004–2005	→ Pescara (loan)	20	(1)
2005–2006	→ Cremonese (loan)	35	(4)
2007	→ Avellino (loan)	16	(1)
2008–2011	Verona	76	(2)
2011–2012	Lecco	4	(0)
2012–2018	Cerea		
2018	Ambrosiana		
- * Club domestic league appearances and goals

Stefano Garzon (born 23 December 1981) is an Italian former professional football player.

== Career ==
He made his Serie A debut on 12 November 2006 for Chievo in a game against Sampdoria when he came on as a substitute in the 82nd minute for Paolo Sammarco.

In January 2008 he left for Verona on loan and in summer 2008 Verona bought half of the registration rights. In June 2009 he deal became permanent.
