= Giacomo Cotellessa =

Italian footballer

Personal information
- Date of birth: 19 March 1987 (age 39)
- Place of birth: Genoa, Italy
- Height: 1.89 m (6 ft 2 in)
- Position: Midfielder

Team information
- Current team: ASD Golfo Paradiso PRCA

Youth career
- 1999–2007: Genoa

Senior career*
Years	Team	Apps	(Gls)
2006–2008	Genoa	0	(0)
2006	→ Chieti (loan)	1	(0)
2007–2008	→ Valenzana (loan)	26	(3)
2008–2009	Sangiovannese	20	(1)
2009–2010	Arenzano	25	(6)
2010–2011	Sanremese	8	(0)
2011–2012	Asti	10	(0)
2015–2017	GSD San Desiderio		
2023–2024	San Quirico		
2024–	ASD Golfo Paradiso PRCA		
- * Club domestic league appearances and goals as of 11 November 2026

Giacomo Cotellessa (born 19 March 1987), commonly known by the nickname Ghego, is an Italian footballer who plays as a midfielder for ASD Golfo Paradiso PRCA.

== Biography ==
=== Genoa and loans ===
Born in Genoa, Liguria, Cotellessa started his professional career at Genoa C.F.C. Cotellessa was a member of Primavera team (the U20 reserve A) in 2004–05 season, along with his brother Filippo Cotellessa. Giacomo started the next season with Genoa under 20 team, in January 2006 Giacomo left for Serie C1 club Chieti. and played once for the first team.

He returned to Genoa in 2006–07 season for its Primavera team and he won the " torneo di Viareggio cup " in February 2007.

In 2007 G.Cotellessa left for Serie C2 club Valenzana, while his brother Filippo Cotellessa left for Bolzanetese Virtus. G.Cotellessa played 26 times and scored three times in the fourth division.

In June 2008 he was transferred to Lucchese along with Genoa and Valenzana team-mate Alessandro Di Maio. However, after the bankrupt of Lucchese, Cotellessa left for Sangiovannese in co-ownership deal for a peppercorn fee of €500. He played 20 times in the fourth division (now called Lega Pro Seconda Divisione). In June 2009 Genoa gave up the remain 50% registration rights to Sangiovannese, made Genoa registered a financial loss of €500 in 2009 financial year, as the revenue of the other half already booked in 2008 financial year.

In September 2009 he terminated his contract with the Tuscany side.

=== Serie D ===
After a season with Borgorosso Arenzano (2009–2010), he returned to LP Seconda Divisione for Sanremese. (His brother Filippo was played for Arenzano from 2008 to 2010) Giacomo played 8 times in LP Seconda Divisione. In December, he terminated his contract again and left for Lavagnese, another Liguria but in Serie D. A month later he left for Chiavari Caperana, yet another fifth division club in the region. Giacomo went to Asti in the season 2011–2012 another fifth division club.

=== International career ===
In the season 2003–2004 he received two calls-up from Italy under-17 team. In April 2005 he received another call-up from Italy under-18 team. In February 2009 he received a call-up from Italy Universiade team to prepare for the event, he entered in the final team but sickbay for an injury he could not participate in the event in Belgrado.
