= Paolo Rossi (footballer, born 1982) =

Italian footballer

Personal information
- Date of birth: 25 December 1982 (age 43)
- Place of birth: Turin, Italy
- Height: 1.72 m (5 ft 8 in)
- Position: Forward

Youth career
- Torino

Senior career*
Years	Team	Apps	(Gls)
2001–2002	Torino	1	(0)
2002–2005	Gualdo	90	(12)
2005–2007	Pavia	55	(5)
2007–2008	Monza	28	(11)
2008–2010	Cittadella	14	(0)
2009	→ Monza (loan)	9	(5)
2009–2010	→ Reggiana (loan)	23	(9)
2010–2011	Ravenna	11	(3)
2011–2013	Reggiana	45	(10)
2014	Olginatese	16	(6)
2016	Scandianese		
Total		292	(61)

International career
1999	Italy U17	1	(0)
- * Club domestic league appearances and goals

Paolo Rossi (born 25 December 1982) is an Italian former professional footballer who played as a forward.

== Career ==
Rossi started his career at hometown club Torino, where he played his first and only match in Serie A.

He later played for Gualdo and Pavia in Serie C1 and C2. In the 2008–09 season he played for Cittadella in Serie B, and was loaned out in the following years to Monza and Reggiana, the teams he most identified with in his career. He ended his career playing for Olginatese in Serie D in 2014. In November 2016 he returned to his career, playing for Scandianese.
