= Luisito Campisi =

Italian footballer (born 1987)

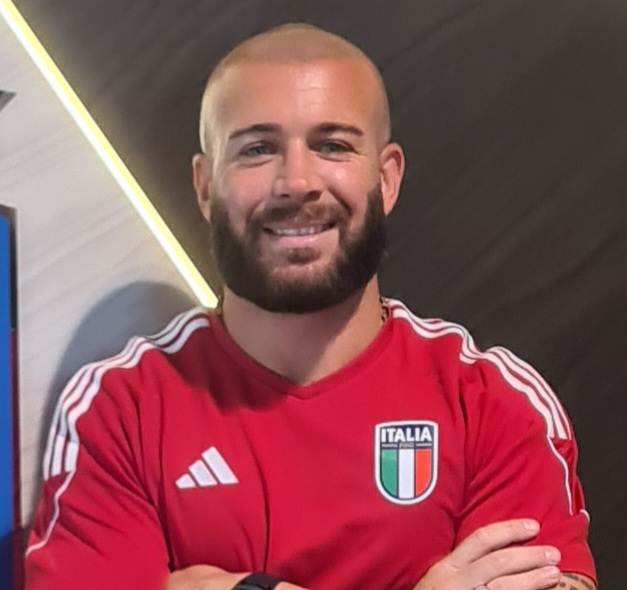
- Campisi in 2023

Personal information
- Full name: Luisito Matteo Campisi
- Date of birth: 19 February 1987 (age 39)
- Place of birth: Milan, Italy
- Height: 1.83 m (6 ft 0 in)
- Position: Midfielder

Youth career
- Atalanta

Senior career*
Years	Team	Apps	(Gls)
2005–2007	Atalanta	1	(0)
2006–2007	→ Pizzighettone (loan)	27	(0)
2007–2008	Massese	27	(1)
2008–2012	Hellas Verona	32	(1)
2010–2011	→ Monza (loan)	24	(0)
2012	Olginatese	14	(0)
2012–2013	Caronnese	13	(0)
2013–2014	Legnano	7	(0)
2014–2015	Magenta		
2015–2016	La Spezia		
2016–2017	Brugherio		

International career
2003	Italy U16	1	(0)
2006	Italy U19	2	(1)
- * Club domestic league appearances and goals

Luisito Matteo Campisi (born 19 February 1987) is an Italian former footballer who played as a midfielder.

== Career ==
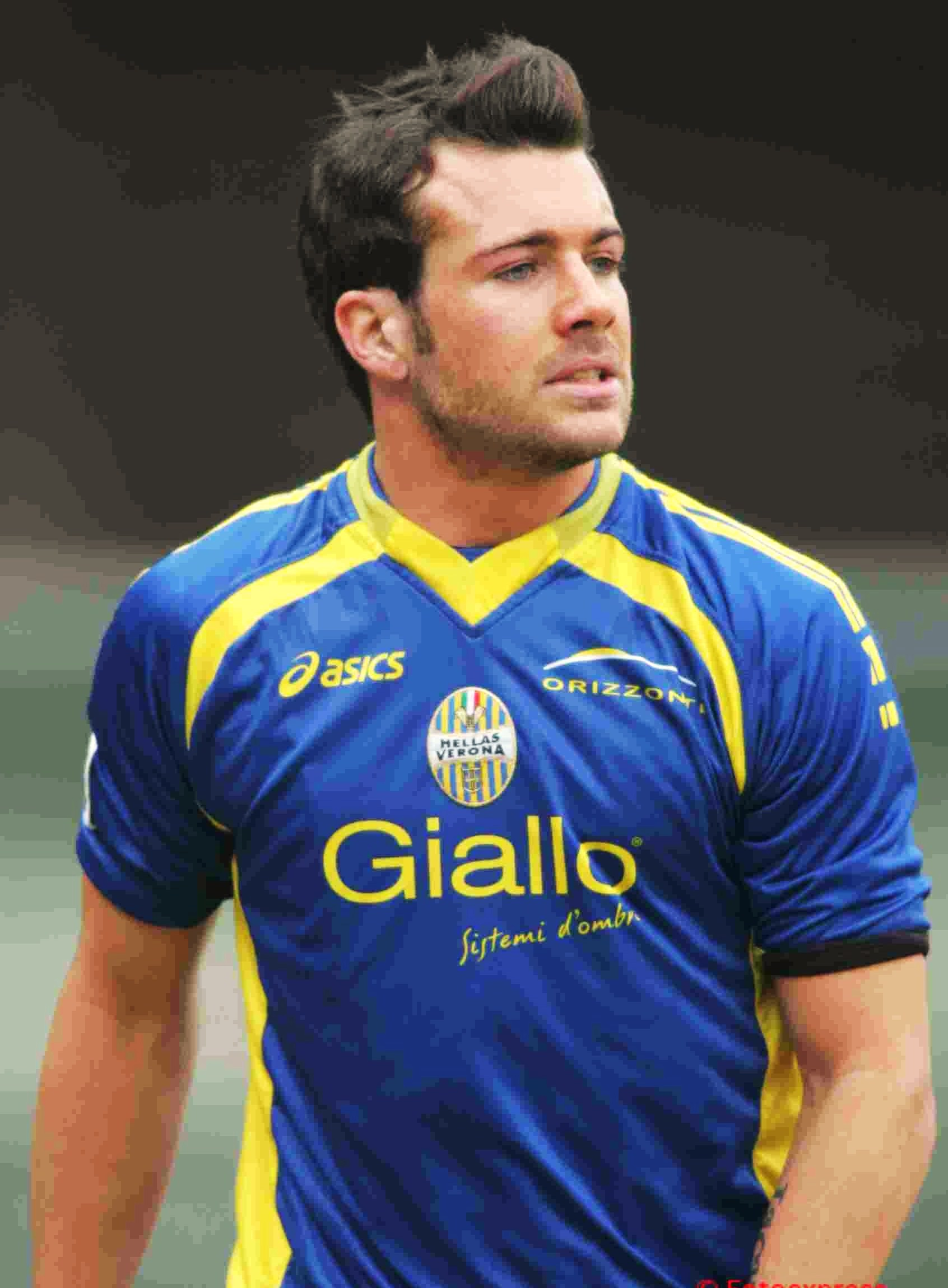
Campisi with Hellas Verona in 2009

Contracted from Atalanta for five years, he was loaned to Pizzighettone in 2006–07 season. In summer 2007, he left for Massese in a co-ownership deal. In June 2008 Atalanta bought him back and subsequently left for Hellas Verona in another co-ownership deal.

Verona bought him outright in June 2010 and loaned to Monza on 31 August 2010. He was the regular of the team, and scored twice in Coppa Italia Lega Pro matches.
