= Adrian Bică Bădan =

Romanian footballer

Personal information
- Date of birth: 11 December 1988 (age 37)
- Place of birth: Constanţa, Romania
- Height: 1.79 m (5 ft 10 1/2 in)
- Position: Defender

Team information
- Current team: Due Torri
- Number: 25

Youth career
- AS Portul Constanta

Senior career*
Years	Team	Apps	(Gls)
2008–2011	Catania	0	(0)
2008–2009	→ Vibonese (loan)	25	(0)
2009–2010	→ Cassino (loan)	20	(0)
2010	→ Milazzo (loan)	10	(0)
2011–2012	FC Viitorul Constanța	11	(0)
2012–2013	Nissa	30	(3)
2013	Mazara	7	(2)
2014	Due Torri	24	(1)
2014–2015	Tiger Brolo	17	(1)
2015	Atletico Campofranco		
2015–2016	Città di Catania		
2017–2018	Misterbianco		
- * Club domestic league appearances and goals

Adrian Bică Bădan (born 11 December 1988 in Constanţa) is a Romanian former footballer.

== Career ==
Bică Bădan played most of his career on loan by U.S. Vibonese Calcio, Cassino and Milazzo, from his club Catania Calcio. In January 2011 returned to his native Romania and signed for FC Viitorul Constanța. He played also sixteen months in his hometown for Viitorul, before returned to Italy to sign for Nissa F.C. A.S.D. After a year for Serie D club Nissa, who played during 30 games, joined to Eccellenza side Mazara Calcio A.S.D. Since Summer 2013 played for Serie D club A.S.D. Due Torri.
