= Alessandro Borgese =

Italian footballer (born 1985)

Personal information
- Date of birth: 9 May 1985 (age 41)
- Place of birth: Palermo, Italy
- Height: 1.81 m (5 ft 11 in)
- Position: Midfielder

Team information
- Current team: ASD FC Osimo 2011

Youth career
- Fincantieri Palermo
- 2003–2004: → Vicenza (loan)
- 2004–2005: Vicenza

Senior career*
Years	Team	Apps	(Gls)
2005–2007	Ancona	38	(2)
2007–2008	Sassuolo	14	(0)
2008–2009	Monza	10	(0)
2009	→ Foligno (loan)	5	(0)
2009–2010	Foligno	30	(0)
2010–2012	Perugia	60	(1)
2012–2013	Foligno	29	(0)
2013–2014	Chieti	18	(0)
2014	Sambenedettese	14	(1)
2014–2017	Matelica	65	(2)
2017–2018	Castelfidardo	28	(1)
2018–2019	Fabriano Cerreto		
2019–2020	Porto Sant'Elpidio MP	25	(0)
2020–2022	Sangiustese VP		
2022–2023	Jesina		
2023–2025	USD Osimana 1922		
2025–	ASD FC Osimo 2011		
- * Club domestic league appearances and goals as of 2 March 2026

Alessandro Borgese (born 9 May 1985) is an Italian footballer who plays as a midfielder for ASD FC Osimo 2011.

== Biography ==
Born in Palermo, Sicily, Borgese joined Vicenza Calcio along with Antonino Bonvissuto in 2003, initially in a loan deal.

=== Ancona ===
In 2005, he left for Ancona in a co-ownership deal, for €250, joining Bonvissuto (loan). In June 2006 Ancona acquired the remain 50% registration rights from Vicenza.

=== Sassuolo ===
He was sold to Sassuolo in 2007 in another co-ownership deal.

=== Monza ===
After the team winning Group A of 2007–08 Serie C1 and acquired the remain 50% registration rights from Ancona, Borgese was sold back to Lega Pro Prime Division (ex- Serie C1) in another co-ownership deal.

=== Foligno ===
However, he only spent half-season in Monza, which he left for Foligno along with Christian Cesaretti. In June 2009 Monza also acquired the remain half from Sassuolo. However, he was transferred to Foligno again in a 1-year contract.

=== Perugia ===
In September 2010 he left for Serie D club Perugia The team won the champion of Group E and promoted back to professional league. In June 2011 his contract was renewed.

=== Serie D career ===
Since 2014 Borgese was a player of Serie D. Due to the shirking of Lega Pro from two divisions to one division, the amateur level (de facto semi-pro) became the fourth level of Italian football. Borgese joined Matelica circa December 2014. He also renewed his contract in June 2015.
