= Marco Gallozzi =

Italian footballer

Personal information
- Full name: Marco Gallozzi
- Date of birth: 27 July 1988 (age 38)
- Place of birth: Frosinone, Italy
- Height: 1.85 m (6 ft 1 in)
- Position: Midfielder

Team information
- Current team: Chievo

Youth career
- Frosinone
- Ascoli

Senior career*
| Years | Team | Apps | (Gls) |
| 2008–2009 | Gubbio | 15 | (0) |
| 2009–2010 | Foligno | 29 | (1) |
| 2010–2013 | Padova | 29 | (1) |
| 2011 | → Chievo (loan) | 0 | (0) |
| 2012 | → Empoli (loan) | 5 | (0) |
| 2013–2014 | L'Aquila | 20 | (2) |
| 2014–2015 | Matera | 5 | (0) |
| 2015– | Reggina | 10 | (0) |
- * Club domestic league appearances and goals

Marco Gallozzi (born 27 July 1988) is an Italian professional footballer who plays midfielder for Reggina Calcio.

== Career ==
He grew up in the youth system of Frosinone and Ascoli. In 2008, he moved to Gubbio in the Seconda Divisione. In 2011, he moved on loan to Serie A club Chievo Verona, but was only available as a substitute for 3 matches and never made any appearances. He moved to Reggina in January 2015.
