= Marco Gorzegno =

Italian footballer

Personal information
- Date of birth: 9 June 1981 (age 45)
- Place of birth: Cuneo, Italy
- Height: 1.88 m (6 ft 2 in)
- Position: Left midfielder

Senior career*
Years	Team	Apps	(Gls)
2000–2001	Juventus	0	(0)
2001–2002	Torres	26	(2)
2002–2003	Prato	30	(2)
2003–2005	Albinoleffe	40	(3)
2005–2006	Spezia	12	(2)
2005–2006	Albinoleffe	9	(0)
2006–2008	Spezia	68	(6)
2008–2011	Brescia	28	(4)
2009–2010	→ Sassuolo (loan)	26	(1)
2010–2011	→ Empoli (loan)	18	(1)
2011–2012	Empoli	25	(0)
2012–2013	Juve Stabia	14	(1)
2014–2015	Carrarese	27	(3)
2015–2016	Cuneo	25	(1)
2016–2017	Fossano Calcio	?	(0)
2017–2018	Cavese	22	(2)
- * Club domestic league appearances and goals

Marco Gorzegno (born 9 June 1981) is an Italian football midfielder.
