= Serhiy Predko =

Ukrainian footballer

Personal information
- Full name: Serhiy Predko
- Date of birth: 25 April 1988 (age 38)
- Place of birth: Chervonohrad, Ukrainian SSR, Soviet Union
- Position: Defender

Team information
- Current team: U.S.D. Novese

Senior career*
Years	Team	Apps	(Gls)
2006–2007	Torino FC	0	(0)
2007–2009	A.C. Pro Sesto	15	(0)
2009	S.S. Cavese	4	(0)
2010	U.S.D. Novese		
- * Club domestic league appearances and goals

Serhiy Predko (born 25 April 1988 in Ukrainian SSR, Soviet Union) is a professional Ukrainian football defender currently plaining for the Italian Serie C1/A club A.C. Pro Sesto. He was acquired from Torino FC in July 2007.From February he is in S.S.Cavese football team [Italian] [First Division]
