= Massimo Gotti =

Italian footballer

Personal information
- Full name: Massimo Gotti
- Date of birth: 27 May 1986 (age 40)
- Place of birth: Lallio, Italy
- Height: 1.84 m (6 ft 0 in)
- Position: Left-back

Youth career
- –2005: Atalanta
- 2005–2006: Udinese

Senior career*
Years	Team	Apps	(Gls)
2006–2011	Udinese	2	(0)
2006–2007	→ Ascoli (loan)	1	(0)
2007–2008	→ Padova (loan)	1	(0)
2008–2010	→ Portogruaro (loan)	57	(0)
2010–2011	→ Empoli (loan)	21	(0)
2011–2013	Ternana	31	(3)
2013–2014	Grosseto	12	(0)
2014	Matera	9	(0)
2015	L'Aquila	9	(0)
Total		143	(3)

International career
2002	Italy U17	1	(0)
- * Club domestic league appearances and goals

Massimo Gotti (born 27 May 1986) is an Italian former professional footballer who played as a left-back.

== Career ==
=== Udinese ===
Gotti signed with Udinese in June 2005. Gotti made his Serie A debut on 5 November 2006 playing for Ascoli in a 2–0 loss against Internazionale. In January 2007 he returned to Udine.

He then left for Lega Pro clubs, winning Lega Pro Prima Divisione Group B in 2010 and promotion to Serie B.

==== Empoli (loan) ====
In July 2010 left for Serie B club Empoli. He was the starting left back of the team (in the first half of the season), only missed a few games to Marco Gorzegno who arrived on 31 August but injured in November.

=== Ternana ===
In 2011–12 season he returned to Udine. Despite awarded a shirt number of no.30, he was excluded from the 25-men squad that submitted to UEFA for 2011–12 UEFA Champions League play-off round.

On 25 August 2011, he moved to Lega Pro Prima Divisione side Ternana in co-ownership deal, the day after eliminated by Arsenal. Ternana won promotion to Serie B in June 2012. On 23 June 2012, Ternana signed him outright. Gotti picked no.4 shirt for Ternana in 2012–13 Serie B, which he played once.

=== Grosseto ===
On 22 September 2013, he was signed by U.S. Grosseto F.C. on a free transfer.

=== L'Aquila ===
In December 2014 he was signed by L'Aquila.

== Honours ==
- Lega Pro Prima Divisione: 2010
