= Piermario Morosini =

Italian footballer (1986–2012)

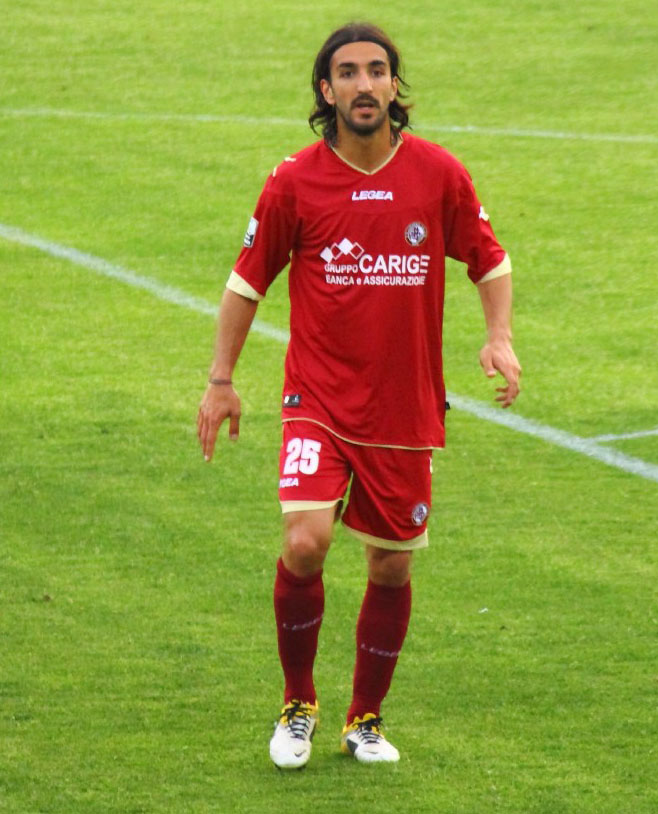
- Morosini with Livorno in 2012

Personal information
- Date of birth: 5 July 1986
- Place of birth: Bergamo, Italy
- Date of death: 14 April 2012 (aged 25)
- Place of death: Pescara, Italy
- Position: Midfielder

Youth career
- Atalanta

Senior career*
Years	Team	Apps	(Gls)
2005–2007	Udinese	5	(0)
2006–2007	→ Bologna (loan)	16	(0)
2007–2009	Vicenza	66	(1)
2009–2012	Udinese	0	(0)
2009–2010	→ Reggina (loan)	17	(0)
2010	→ Padova (loan)	14	(0)
2011	→ Vicenza (loan)	15	(0)
2012	→ Livorno (loan)	8	(0)
Total		141	(1)

International career
2001–2003	Italy U17	16	(1)
2003–2004	Italy U18	7	(0)
2004–2005	Italy U19	12	(0)
2005–2007	Italy U20	3	(0)
2006–2009	Italy U21	18	(0)
- * Club domestic league appearances and goals

Piermario Morosini (5 July 1986 – 14 April 2012) was an Italian professional footballer who played as a midfielder. On 14 April 2012, during a match between Pescara and Livorno, Morosini suffered a fatal cardiac arrest on the pitch.

== Early life ==
Piermario Morosini was born on 5 July 1986, in Bergamo, Italy. His mother Camilla died in 2001, when he was fifteen years old from an incurable disease. His father, Aldo, died from an illness in 2003, followed shortly after by a disabled brother who committed suicide, leaving him alone with a disabled elder sister.

Shortly after his parents' death, Morosini remarked that "these are the things that change your life, but at the same time make you so angry and help you achieve what was also a dream of my parents."

== Club ==
Morosini started his career at hometown club Atalanta, and was sold to Udinese in a co-ownership deal during 2005.

On 23 October 2005, he debuts in Serie A in the match Udinese-Inter, collecting in total five appearances in this league. In this season 2005–06 he debuts also in UEFA Cup in the match Levski Sofia-Udinese.

Udinese got full ownership from Atalanta in 2006, and loaned him to Bologna in order to gain experience. From 2007 to 2009 half of the registration rights was farmed to Serie B club Vicenza Calcio. Morosini signed four-year contract with Vicenza and sold for €500,000. Udinese acquired Morosini back from Vicenza for €300,000.

On 31 August 2009, Morosini signed for newly relegated side Reggina on loan.

On 1 February 2010, he was loaned to Calcio Padova. In June 2010, the club decided not to buy him outright.

In January 2011 he was transferred on loan to Vicenza and played 15 times for this club.

On 31 January 2012, he went on loan to Livorno playing 8 matches.

== International career ==
Morosini made his international debut for the Italy U-17 team in 2001 and his U-21 debut in 2006. He was called up for the 2009 European U21 Championships as back-up.

== Death and legacy ==
On 14 April 2012, while representing Livorno, Morosini suffered cardiac arrest and fell to the ground in the 31st minute of the Serie B match away to Pescara. He stumbled on the ground, trying to get up, before losing consciousness and receiving medical attention on the field. A defibrillator was present but not used on Morosini, who was conscious when he was taken on the stretcher. According to the news agency ANSA, a city police car was blocking the stadium's exit for the ambulance for nearly a minute, but a heart specialist said that the delay made no difference. After Morosini was taken to the hospital, the match was abandoned with Livorno leading 2–0, and some players reportedly "left the field in tears".

Morosini was rushed to the Santo Spirito hospital, but reports later indicated he died before reaching the hospital. Italian media reports were alerted of Morosini's death after an "explosion of shouts and tears" by his teammates who had gone to the hospital.

Morosini's death came four weeks after Fabrice Muamba suffered a cardiac arrest in an English FA Cup match, after which awareness of heart risk had been raised in Italian football. Morosini's sister, who is disabled, was left with no family. However, Udinese player Antonio Di Natale confirmed that he would financially support and look after her.

Experts stated that when the emergency doctor arrived to treat Morosini, his survival chances were around 70% if a defibrillator had been used promptly. This failure led to a 2016 manslaughter conviction for three doctors—Vito Molfese (1 year), Manilo Porcellini (8 months), and Ernesto Sabatini (8 months)—along with a joint compensation order of €150,000 involving the doctors, Pescara’s health authority (ASL), and the football club.

In 2018, the Court of Appeal upheld the convictions. However, in 2019, the Court of Cassation overturned them, citing flawed reasoning in the original verdict and ordered a retrial. Later that year, the Court of Appeal in Perugia acquitted all three doctors, concluding that the chaotic emergency conditions made it unreasonable to expect a different response. As a result, no one was held legally responsible for Morosini’s death.

After the autopsy, it was revealed that Morosini had a genetic predisposition to arrhythmogenic cardiomyopathy, a condition capable of triggering ventricular fibrillation and, consequently, cardiac arrest. Further genetic testing and autopsy confirmed the presence of a myocardial scar on his heart, a hallmark of the disease and a likely contributor to the fatal event.

=== Legacy ===
All of the Italian football league matches for the weekend were suspended. Livorno and Vicenza then decided they would retire the number 25, the number Morosini wore whilst their player.

Several days after Morosini's death, the Curva Sud of the Stadio Atleti Azzurri d'Italia—the home stadium of Atalanta—was renamed the Curva Piermario Morosini in his honour.

On the third anniversary of his death, Juventus goalkeeper Gianluigi Buffon dedicated his side's 1–0 away win over Monaco in the 2014–15 UEFA Champions League quarter-final to Morosini. The award for the best player of Campionato Primavera is named after him.
