= AS Noicattaro Calcio =

Italian football club

Noicattaro
- Full name: Associazione Sportiva Noicattaro Calcio
- Founded: 1992
- Dissolved: 2010
- Ground: Stadio Comunale, Noicattaro, Italy
- Capacity: 2,500
- 2009–10: Lega Pro Seconda Divisione C, 15th
Home colours	Away colours

Associazione Sportiva Noicattaro Calcio was an Italian association football club located in Noicattaro, Apulia. Its colors were black and red.

In 2006–07, Noicattaro won the division H of Serie D league thus gaining its first promotion ever in Serie C2.

In its last season it played in Lega Pro Seconda Divisione. Following bankruptcy in 2010, they subsequently folded.
