= 2003–04 Atalanta BC season =

Atalanta
2003–04 season
- Chairman: Ivan Ruggeri
- Manager: Andrea Mandorlini
- Serie B: 5th
- Coppa Italia: First Round
- Top goalscorer: League: Igor Budan (11); All: Carmine Gautieri, Igor Budan (11)

The 2003–04 season was the 97th season in Atalanta's history. Atalanta was promoted to Serie A, despite finishing only 5th in Serie B. The reason for the promotion was the expansion of the top domestic division from 18 to 20 teams. That offered a reprieve to an underperforming Atalanta side that failed to keep up with Palermo following Christmas.

== Squad ==
=== Goalkeepers ===
- (Italy) Massimo Taibi
- (Italy) Alex Calderoni

=== Defenders ===
- (Italy) Gianpaolo Bellini
- (Italy) Natale Gonnella
- (Italy) Duccio Innocenti
- (Italy) Stefano Lorenzi
- (Italy) Fabio Rustico
- (Brazil) Santos
- (Senegal) Mohamed Sarr
- (Serbia and Montenegro) Vlado Šmit

=== Midfielders ===
- (Italy) Antonio Bernardini
- (Italy) Andrea Lazzari
- (Italy) Michele Marcolini
- (Italy) Nicola Mingazzini
- (Italy) Riccardo Montolivo
- (Italy) Biagio Pagano
- (Italy) Alex Pinardi
- (Italy) Damiano Zenoni

=== Attackers ===
- (Italy) Rolando Bianchi
- (Croatia) Igor Budan
- (Italy) Gianni Comandini
- (Italy) Carmine Gautieri
- (Italy) Luigi Della Rocca
- (Italy) Giampaolo Pazzini
- (Italy) Luca Saudati
- (Croatia) Davor Vugrinec

== Serie B ==
=== League table ===
Pos	Team	Pld	W	D	L	GF	GA	GD	Pts	Promotion or relegation
3	Livorno (P)	46	20	19	7	75	45	+30	79	Promotion to Serie A
4	Messina (P)	46	21	16	9	71	45	+26	79	Promotion to Serie A
5	Atalanta (P)	46	19	20	7	59	36	+23	77	Promotion to Serie A
6	Fiorentina (P)	46	19	16	11	53	48	+5	73	Qualification for Promotion play-offs
7	Ternana	46	18	15	13	64	52	+12	69	

Source: Almanacco Illustrato del Calcio - La Storia 1898-2004, Panini Edizioni, Modena, September 2005
Rules for classification: 1) points; 2) head-to-head points; 3) head-to-head goal difference; 4) head-to-head goals scored; 5) goal difference; 6) number of goals scored.
(P) Promoted

=== Results summary ===
Overall								Home						Away					
Pld	W	D	L	GF	GA	GD	Pts	W	D	L	GF	GA	GD	W	D	L	GF	GA	GD
46	19	20	7	59	36	+23	77	11	10	2	31	16	+15	8	10	5	28	20	+8

Source: Serie B

=== Results by round ===
Round	1	2	3	4	5	6	7	8	9	10	11	12	13	14	15	16	17	18	19	20	21	22	23	24	25	26	27	28	29	30	31	32	33	34	35	36	37	38	39	40	41	42	43	44	45	46
Ground	A	H	A	H	A	H	A	H	H	A	H	A	A	H	A	H	A	H	A	H	A	H	A	H	A	H	A	H	A	H	A	A	H	A	H	H	A	H	A	H	A	H	A	H	A	H
Result	D	D	D	W	W	W	W	W	W	W	D	D	D	W	D	D	W	W	D	D	D	D	W	D	L	L	W	W	L	L	D	D	D	L	D	W	W	W	D	W	L	D	L	W	W	D
Position	5	13	16	7	3	3	2	1	1	1	1	1	1	1	1	2	1	1	1	1	1	2	1	1	1	1	1	1	1	1	2	2	2	3	4	4	3	3	2	2	5	5	5	5	5	5

Source: Serie B
A = Away; H = Home; W = Win; D = Draw; L = Loss

=== Matches ===
7 September 2003 2	Atalanta	0–0	Venezia	Bergamo
15:00 CEST (UTC+02:00)				Stadium: Stadio Atleti Azzurri d'Italia; Attendance: 10,281; Referee: Andrea Carlucci

11 September 2003 3	Piacenza	0–0	Atalanta	Piacenza
20:30 CEST (UTC+02:00)				Stadium: Stadio Leonardo Garilli; Attendance: 6,000; Referee: Andrea De Marco

15 September 2003 4	Atalanta	2–1	AlbinoLeffe	Bergamo
20:30 CEST (UTC+02:00)	Pinardi 67'; Pazzini 82'		Possanzini 57'	Stadium: Stadio Atleti Azzurri d'Italia; Attendance: 11,262; Referee: Salvatore Racalbuto

20 September 2003 5	Genoa	0–3	Atalanta	Genoa
20:30 CEST (UTC+02:00)			Pinardi 13', 26'; Budan 38'	Stadium: Stadio Luigi Ferraris; Attendance: 19,099; Referee: Massimiliano Saccani

23 September 2003 1	Fiorentina	1–1	Atalanta	Florence
20:30 CEST (UTC+02:00)	Di Livio 30'		Budan 67'	Stadium: Stadio Artemio Franchi; Attendance: 27,784; Referee: Emidio Morganti

27 September 2003 6	Atalanta	2–1	Cagliari	Bergamo
20:30 CEST (UTC+02:00)	Marcolini 9'; Budan 32'		Loria 20'	Stadium: Stadio Atleti Azzurri d'Italia; Attendance: 12,000; Referee: Antonio Dattilo

4 October 2003 7	Hellas Verona	1–2	Atalanta	Verona
20:30 CEST (UTC+02:00)	Waigo 90+1'		Gautieri 18'; Budan 20'	Stadium: Stadio Marcantonio Bentegodi; Attendance: 12,857; Referee: Antonio Dattilo

12 October 2003 8	Atalanta	4–1	Triestina	Bergamo
15:00 CEST (UTC+02:00)	Marcolini 3'; Budan 55', 57'; Pazzini 81'		Godeas 27'	Stadium: Stadio Atleti Azzurri d'Italia; Attendance: 10,725; Referee: Salvatore Racalbuto

15 October 2003 9	Atalanta	1–0	Pescara	Bergamo
20:30 CEST (UTC+02:00)	Gautieri 60'			Stadium: Stadio Atleti Azzurri d'Italia; Attendance: 10,457; Referee: Alberto Castellani

18 October 2003 10	Torino	0–1	Atalanta	Turin
20:30 CEST (UTC+02:00)			Marcolini 21'	Stadium: Stadio delle Alpi; Attendance: 13,500; Referee: Nicola Ayroldi

25 October 2003 11	Atalanta	2–2	Messina	Bergamo
20:30 CEST (UTC+02:00)	Pazzini 47'; Gautieri 90+3'		Parisi 36', 50' (pen.)	Stadium: Stadio Atleti Azzurri d'Italia; Attendance: 10,742; Referee: Antonio Dattilo

2 November 2003 12	Palermo	0–0	Atalanta	Palermo
15:00 CET (UTC+01:00)				Stadium: Stadio Renzo Barbera; Attendance: 30,255; Referee: Marco Gabriele

9 November 2003 13	Ascoli	1–1	Atalanta	Ascoli Piceno
15:00 CET (UTC+01:00)	Fontana 61'		Pinardi 58'	Stadium: Stadio Cino e Lillo Del Duca; Attendance: 6,896; Referee: Cosimo Bolognino

16 November 2003 14	Atalanta	2–1	Como	Bergamo
15:00 CET (UTC+01:00)	Marcolini 71' (pen.); Bernardini 90+2'		Makinwa 13'	Stadium: Stadio Atleti Azzurri d'Italia; Attendance: 9,278; Referee: Gianluca Rocchi

20 November 2003 15	Catania	1–1	Atalanta	Catania
20:30 CET (UTC+01:00)	Šedivec 45'		Budan 2'	Stadium: Stadio Angelo Massimino; Attendance: 14,429; Referee: Nicola Ayroldi

23 November 2003 16	Atalanta	0–0	Napoli	Bergamo
15:00 CET (UTC+01:00)				Stadium: Stadio Atleti Azzurri d'Italia; Attendance: 11,488; Referee: Gianluca Paparesta

30 November 2003 17	Vicenza	0–1	Atalanta	Vicenza
15:00 CET (UTC+01:00)			Gonnella 54'	Stadium: Stadio Romeo Menti; Attendance: 8,408; Referee: Pasquale Rodomonti

7 December 2003 18	Atalanta	2–0	Bari	Bergamo
15:00 CET (UTC+01:00)	Budan 28'; Montolivo 31'			Stadium: Stadio Atleti Azzurri d'Italia; Attendance: 9,225; Referee: Pasquale Rodomonti

14 December 2003 19	Livorno	0–0	Atalanta	Livorno
15:00 CET (UTC+01:00)				Stadium: Stadio Armando Picchi; Attendance: 11,863; Referee: Antonio Giannoccaro

21 December 2003 20	Atalanta	1–1	Ternana	Bergamo
15:00 CET (UTC+01:00)	Budan 89'		Zampagna 87' (pen.)	Stadium: Stadio Atleti Azzurri d'Italia; Attendance: 9,999; Referee: Nicola Ayroldi

6 January 2004 21	Avellino	1–1	Atalanta	Avellino
15:00 CET (UTC+01:00)	Tisci 4' (pen.)		Budan 7'	Stadium: Stadio Partenio; Attendance: 7,714; Referee: Paolo Dondarini

11 January 2004 22	Atalanta	2–2	Treviso	Bergamo
15:00 CET (UTC+01:00)	Gautieri 9', 84'		Ganci 17', 60'	Stadium: Stadio Atleti Azzurri d'Italia; Attendance: 10,277; Referee: Antonio Dattilo

18 January 2004 23	Salernitana	1–3	Atalanta	Salerno
15:00 CET (UTC+01:00)	Perna 33'		Pazzini 4', 56'; Pinardi 45'	Stadium: Stadio Arechi; Attendance: 11,223; Referee: Stefano Farina

25 January 2004 24	Atalanta	1–1	Fiorentina	Bergamo
15:00 CET (UTC+01:00)	Gautieri 82'		Santos 22' (o.g.)	Stadium: Stadio Atleti Azzurri d'Italia; Attendance: 14,246; Referee: Roberto Rosetti

1 February 2004 25	Venezia	1–0	Atalanta	Venice
15:00 CET (UTC+01:00)	Poggi 72'			Stadium: Stadio Pierluigi Penzo; Attendance: 3,487; Referee: Andrea De Marco

8 February 2004 26	Atalanta	0–1	Piacenza	Bergamo
15:00 CET (UTC+01:00)			Beghetto 19'	Stadium: Stadio Atleti Azzurri d'Italia; Attendance: 10,992; Referee: Antonio Giannoccaro

13 February 2004 27	AlbinoLeffe	0–4	Atalanta	Bergamo
20:30 CET (UTC+01:00)			Pinardi 5'; Montolivo 45'; Gautieri 50'; Marcolini 55'	Stadium: Stadio Atleti Azzurri d'Italia; Attendance: 12,648; Referee: Massimiliano Saccani

22 February 2004 28	Atalanta	1–0	Genoa	Bergamo
15:00 CET (UTC+01:00)	Gautieri 90+4'			Stadium: Stadio Atleti Azzurri d'Italia; Attendance: 10,005; Referee: Christian Brighi

1 March 2004 29	Cagliari	5–1	Atalanta	Cagliari
15:00 CET (UTC+01:00)	Albino 16'; Zola 23' (pen.), 60'; Loria 83'; Suazo 90'		Saudati 35'	Stadium: Stadio Sant'Elia; Attendance: 15,000; Referee: Luca Palanca

4 March 2004 30	Atalanta	0–2	Hellas Verona	Bergamo
20:30 CET (UTC+01:00)			Italiano 24'; Waigo 82'	Stadium: Stadio Atleti Azzurri d'Italia; Attendance: 9,990; Referee: Stefano Cassarà

7 March 2004 31	Triestina	1–1	Atalanta	Trieste
15:00 CET (UTC+01:00)	Moscardelli 48'		Pinardi 38'	Stadium: Stadio Nereo Rocco; Attendance: 8,567; Referee: Massimiliano Saccani

14 March 2004 32	Pescara	0–0	Atalanta	Pescara
15:00 CET (UTC+01:00)				Stadium: Stadio Adriatico; Attendance: 4,442; Referee: Nicola Ayroldi

18 March 2004 33	Atalanta	1–1	Torino	Bergamo
20:30 CET (UTC+01:00)	Marcolini 71'		Tiribocchi 68'	Stadium: Stadio Atleti Azzurri d'Italia; Attendance: 11,696; Referee: Paolo Dondarini

21 March 2004 34	Messina	3–0	Atalanta	Messina
15:00 CET (UTC+01:00)	Di Napoli 15'; Parisi 45'; Sullo 74' (pen.)			Stadium: Stadio Giovanni Celeste; Attendance: 11,043; Referee: Paolo Bertini

28 March 2004 35	Atalanta	0–0	Palermo	Bergamo
20:30 CEST (UTC+02:00)				Stadium: Stadio Atleti Azzurri d'Italia; Attendance: 15,149; Referee: Massimo De Santis

5 April 2004 36	Atalanta	2–0	Ascoli	Bergamo
20:30 CEST (UTC+02:00)	Gautieri 36' (pen.); Pazzini 57'			Stadium: Stadio Atleti Azzurri d'Italia; Attendance: 10,750; Referee: Andrea De Marco

10 April 2004 37	Como	0–3	Atalanta	Como
15:00 CEST (UTC+02:00)			Gautieri 37'; Saudati 43' (pen.); Pazzini 78'	Stadium: Stadio Giuseppe Sinigaglia; Attendance: 3,526; Referee: Nicola Rizzoli

17 April 2004 38	Atalanta	3–0	Catania	Bergamo
20:30 CEST (UTC+02:00)	Gonnella 27'; Bellini 57'; Gautieri 74'			Stadium: Stadio Atleti Azzurri d'Italia; Attendance: 10,786; Referee: Stefano Farina

24 April 2004 39	Napoli	0–0	Atalanta	Naples
20:30 CEST (UTC+02:00)				Stadium: Stadio San Paolo; Attendance: 16,642; Referee: Christian Brighi

30 April 2004 40	Atalanta	3–2	Vicenza	Bergamo
20:30 CEST (UTC+02:00)	Bellini 33'; Pazzini 37'; Pinardi 90+6'		Schwoch 42' (pen.); Taibi 65' (o.g.)	Stadium: Stadio Atleti Azzurri d'Italia; Attendance: 7,415; Referee: Oscar Girardi

8 May 2004 41	Bari	2–1	Atalanta	Bari
20:30 CEST (UTC+02:00)	Cordova 80' (pen.); Bruno 85'		Saudati 43'	Stadium: Stadio San Nicola; Attendance: 9,486; Referee: Mauro Bergonzi

16 May 2004 42	Atalanta	0–0	Livorno	Bergamo
20:30 CEST (UTC+02:00)				Stadium: Stadio Atleti Azzurri d'Italia; Attendance: 14,405; Referee: Pierluigi Collina

22 May 2004 43	Ternana	2–1	Atalanta	Terni
20:30 CEST (UTC+02:00)	Corrent 20'; Zampagna 46'		Budan 39'	Stadium: Stadio Libero Liberati; Attendance: 6,550; Referee: Massimo De Santis

29 May 2004 44	Atalanta	2–0	Avellino	Bergamo
20:30 CEST (UTC+02:00)	Montolivo 18'; Gautieri 80'			Stadium: Stadio Atleti Azzurri d'Italia; Attendance: 12,035; Referee: Daniele Tombolini

5 June 2004 45	Treviso	0–3	Atalanta	Treviso
20:30 CEST (UTC+02:00)			Saudati 6' (pen.); Montolivo 24'; Pazzini 49'	Stadium: Stadio Omobono Tenni; Attendance: 5,140; Referee: Tiziano Pieri

12 June 2004 46	Atalanta	0–0	Salernitana	Bergamo
20:30 CEST (UTC+02:00)				Stadium: Stadio Atleti Azzurri d'Italia; Attendance: 23,500; Referee: Gianluca Paparesta

== Player statistics ==
No.	Pos	Nat	Player	Total		Serie A		Coppa Italia	
No.	Pos	Nat	Player	Apps	Goals	Apps	Goals	Apps	Goals
Goalkeepers
1	GK	(Italy) ITA	Massimo Taibi	47	0	46	0	1	0
27	GK	(Italy) ITA	Alex Calderoni	5	0	3	0	2	0
Defenders
30	DF	(Italy) ITA	Gianpaolo Bellini	30	2	30	2	0	0
17	DF	(Brazil) BRA	Gleison Santos	6	0	6	0	0	0
3	DF	(Italy) ITA	Natale Gonnella	42	2	41	2	1	0
13	DF	(Italy) ITA	Duccio Innocenti	35	0	34	0	1	0
5	DF	(Italy) ITA	Stefano Lorenzi	36	0	36	0	0	0
2	DF	(Italy) ITA	Fabio Rustico	12	0	12	0	0	0
15	DF	(Senegal) SEN	Mohamed Sarr	7	0	6	0	1	0
23	DF	(Serbia and Montenegro) SCG	Vlado Šmit	24	0	24	0	0	0
Midfielders
8	MF	(Italy) ITA	Antonino Bernardini	42	1	41	1	1	0
21	MF	(Italy) ITA	Andrea Lazzari	6	0	6	0	0	0
7	MF	(Italy) ITA	Michele Marcolini	46	6	45	6	1	0
22	MF	(Italy) ITA	Nicola Mingazzini	32	0	31	0	1	0
18	MF	(Italy) ITA	Riccardo Montolivo	42	4	41	4	1	0
10	MF	(Italy) ITA	Alex Pinardi	38	7	37	7	1	0
77	MF	(Italy) ITA	Damiano Zenoni	43	0	42	0	1	0
	MF	(Italy) ITA	Biagio Pagano	6	0	5	0	1	0
Forwards
	FW	(Croatia) CRO	Igor Budan	23	11	23	11	0	0
	FW	(Italy) ITA	Luigi Della Rocca	6	0	6	0	0	0
10	FW	(Italy) ITA	Carmine Gautieri	46	11	46	11	0	0
29	FW	(Italy) ITA	Giampaolo Pazzini	40	9	39	9	1	0
9	FW	(Italy) ITA	Luca Saudati	19	6	19	6	0	0
	FW	(Croatia) CRO	Davor Vugrinec	15	0	15	0	0	0
	FW	(Italy) ITA	Gianni Comandini	6	0	6	0	0	0

Source: http://calcio-seriea.net/presenze/2003/2952/
