= 2004–05 Atalanta BC season =

Atalanta
2004–05 season
- Chairman: Ivan Ruggeri
- Manager: Andrea Mandorlini; Delio Rossi
- Serie A: 20th
- Coppa Italia: Quarter-finals
- Top goalscorer: League: Stephen Makinwa (6); All: Andrea Lazzari (10)

Atalanta BC failed to prolong its Serie A stint by more than one season, due to a poor start to the season. Delio Rossi took over at the helm, and helped by the breakthroughs of striker Stephen Makinwa and playmaker Riccardo Montolivo, Atalanta was able to catch up with the teams above the relegation zone, but went down due to a 1-0 defeat to Roma in the penultimate round.

== Squad ==
=== Goalkeepers ===
- (Italy) Massimo Taibi
- (Italy) Alex Calderoni
- (Italy) Nicholas Caglioni

=== Defenders ===
- (Brazil) Adriano Pereira
- (Italy) Gianpaolo Bellini
- (Italy) Daniele Capelli
- (Italy) Natale Gonnella
- (Italy) Duccio Innocenti
- (Italy) Stefano Lorenzi
- (Italy) Marco Motta
- (Italy) Cesare Natali
- (Italy) Claudio Rivalta
- (Italy) Luigi Sala

=== Midfielders ===
- (Italy) Demetrio Albertini
- (Italy) Antonio Bernardini
- (Italy) Andrea Lazzari
- (Italy) Riccardo Montolivo
- (Italy) Michele Marcolini
- (Italy) Giulio Migliaccio
- (Italy) Nicola Mingazzini
- (Italy) Biagio Pagano
- (Italy) Damiano Zenoni

=== Attackers ===
- (Croatia) Igor Budan
- (Greece) Lampros Choutos
- (Italy) Gianni Comandini
- (Italy) Marino Defendi
- (Italy) Carmine Gautieri
- (Nigeria) Stephen Makinwa
- (Italy) Giampaolo Pazzini
- (Brazil) Piá
- (Italy) Luca Saudati
- (Italy) Davide Sinigaglia

== Competitions ==
=== Serie A ===
==== League table ====
| Pos | Team | Pld | W | D | L | GF | GA | GD | Pts | Qualification or relegation |
|---|---|---|---|---|---|---|---|---|---|---|
| 16 | Fiorentina | 38 | 9 | 15 | 14 | 42 | 50 | −8 | 42 | |
| 17 | Parma | 38 | 10 | 12 | 16 | 48 | 65 | −17 | 42 | Relegation tie-breaker |
| 18 | Bologna (R) | 38 | 9 | 15 | 14 | 33 | 36 | −3 | 42 | Serie B after tie-breaker |
| 19 | Brescia (R) | 38 | 11 | 8 | 19 | 37 | 54 | −17 | 41 | Relegation to Serie B |
| 20 | Atalanta (R) | 38 | 8 | 11 | 19 | 34 | 45 | −11 | 35 | Relegation to Serie B |

Source: 2004–05 Serie A, RSSSF.com, Soccerway
Rules for classification: 1) Points; 2) Head-to-head points; 3) Head-to-head goal difference; 4) Goal difference; 5) Goals scored; 6) Draw. (Note: Head-to-head record is used only after all the matches between the teams in question have been played).
(R) Relegated

==== Results summary ====
| Overall | | | | | | | | Home | | | | | | Away | | | | | |
| Pld | W | D | L | GF | GA | GD | Pts | W | D | L | GF | GA | GD | W | D | L | GF | GA | GD |
|---|---|---|---|---|---|---|---|---|---|---|---|---|---|---|---|---|---|---|---|
| 38 | 8 | 11 | 19 | 34 | 45 | −11 | 35 | 7 | 6 | 6 | 21 | 17 | +4 | 1 | 5 | 13 | 13 | 28 | −15 |

==== Results by round ====
| Round | 1 | 2 | 3 | 4 | 5 | 6 | 7 | 8 | 9 | 10 | 11 | 12 | 13 | 14 | 15 | 16 | 17 | 18 | 19 | 20 | 21 | 22 | 23 | 24 | 25 | 26 | 27 | 28 | 29 | 30 | 31 | 32 | 33 | 34 | 35 | 36 | 37 | 38 |
|---|---|---|---|---|---|---|---|---|---|---|---|---|---|---|---|---|---|---|---|---|---|---|---|---|---|---|---|---|---|---|---|---|---|---|---|---|---|---|
| Ground | H | A | H | A | H | A | H | A | A | H | A | H | H | A | H | A | H | A | H | A | H | A | H | A | H | A | H | H | A | H | A | A | H | A | H | A | H | A |
| Result | D | L | L | D | D | L | D | L | D | D | L | D | L | L | L | L | W | L | D | L | L | L | W | L | W | D | L | W | W | W | L | D | W | L | W | D | L | L |
| Position | 6 | 16 | 17 | 19 | 17 | 18 | 20 | 20 | 20 | 20 | 20 | 20 | 20 | 20 | 20 | 20 | 20 | 20 | 20 | 20 | 20 | 20 | 20 | 20 | 20 | 20 | 20 | 20 | 20 | 19 | 20 | 20 | 20 | 20 | 20 | 20 | 20 | 20 |

A = Away; H = Home; W = Win; D = Draw; L = Loss

==== Matches ====
| 12 September 2004 1 | Atalanta | 2–2 | Lecce | Bergamo |
| 15:00 CEST (UTC+02:00) | Pazzini 2'; Albertini 52' | | Giacomazzi 9'; Bojinov 76' | Stadium: Stadio Atleti Azzurri d'Italia; Attendance: 12,320; Referee: Pasquale Rodomonti |

| 19 September 2004 2 | Juventus | 2–0 | Atalanta | Turin |
| 15:00 CEST (UTC+02:00) | Trezeguet 14', 58' | | | Stadium: Stadio delle Alpi; Attendance: 22,000; Referee: Massimo De Santis |

| 22 September 2004 3 | Atalanta | 2–3 | Internazionale | Bergamo |
| 20:30 CEST (UTC+02:00) | Budan 25'; Pazzini 84' | | Stanković 54'; Recoba 79'; Adriano 87' | Stadium: Stadio Atleti Azzurri d'Italia; Attendance: 21,962; Referee: Gianluca Paparesta |

| 26 September 2004 4 | Livorno | 1–1 | Atalanta | Livorno |
| 15:00 CEST (UTC+02:00) | Vigiani 73' | | Gautieri 71' | Stadium: Stadio Armando Picchi; Attendance: 19,000; Referee: Nicola Ayroldi |

| 3 October 2004 5 | Atalanta | 1–1 | Lazio | Bergamo |
| 15:00 CEST (UTC+02:00) | Gautieri 11' | | Muzzi 85' | Stadium: Stadio Atleti Azzurri d'Italia; Attendance: 12,000; Referee: Pierluigi Collina |

| 17 October 2004 6 | Bologna | 2–1 | Atalanta | Bologna |
| 15:00 CEST (UTC+02:00) | Bellucci 37'; Amoroso 60' | | Budan 12' | Stadium: Stadio Renato Dall'Ara; Attendance: 22,000; Referee: Stefano Farina |

| 23 October 2004 7 | Atalanta | 2–2 | Cagliari | Bergamo |
| 18:00 CEST (UTC+02:00) | Pazzini 2'; Montolivo 40' | | Mau. Esposito 12'; Loria 29' | Stadium: Stadio Atleti Azzurri d'Italia; Attendance: 12,000; Referee: Tiziano Pieri |

| 27 October 2004 8 | Milan | 3–0 | Atalanta | Milan |
| 20:30 CEST (UTC+02:00) | Tomasson 53'; Kaladze 71'; Serginho 90+2' | | | Stadium: San Siro; Attendance: 57,531; Referee: Paolo Bertini |

| 31 October 2004 9 | Parma | 2–2 | Atalanta | Parma |
| 15:00 CET (UTC+01:00) | Gilardino 40', 55' | | Budan 45'; Montolivo 76' | Stadium: Stadio Ennio Tardini; Attendance: 12,000; Referee: Andrea De Marco |

| 7 November 2004 10 | Atalanta | 0–0 | Sampdoria | Bergamo |
| 15:00 CET (UTC+01:00) | | | | Stadium: Stadio Atleti Azzurri d'Italia; Attendance: 12,000; Referee: Pierluigi Collina |

| 10 November 2004 11 | Chievo | 1–0 | Atalanta | Verona |
| 20:30 CET (UTC+01:00) | Tiribocchi 74' | | | Stadium: Stadio Marcantonio Bentegodi; Attendance: 7,218; Referee: Massimiliano Saccani |

| 14 November 2004 12 | Atalanta | 0–0 | Brescia | Bergamo |
| 15:00 CET (UTC+01:00) | | | | Stadium: Stadio Atleti Azzurri d'Italia; Attendance: 16,000; Referee: Roberto Rosetti |

| 28 November 2004 13 | Atalanta | 0–1 | Reggina | Bergamo |
| 15:00 CET (UTC+01:00) | | | Paredes 12' | Stadium: Stadio Atleti Azzurri d'Italia; Attendance: 15,000; Referee: Paolo Bertini |

| 5 December 2004 14 | Palermo | 1–0 | Atalanta | Palermo |
| 15:00 CET (UTC+01:00) | Brienza 44' | | | Stadium: Stadio Renzo Barbera; Attendance: 33,000; Referee: Nicola Rizzoli |

| 11 December 2004 15 | Atalanta | 0–1 | Udinese | Bergamo |
| 18:00 CET (UTC+01:00) | | | Iaquinta 8' | Stadium: Stadio Atleti Azzurri d'Italia; Attendance: 12,000; Referee: Matteo Trefoloni |

| 6 January 2005 17 | Atalanta | 1–0 | Fiorentina | Bergamo |
| 15:00 CET (UTC+01:00) | Budan 81' | | | Stadium: Stadio Atleti Azzurri d'Italia; Attendance: 12,000; Referee: Stefano Cassarà |

| 9 January 2005 18 | Roma | 2–1 | Atalanta | Rome |
| 15:00 CET (UTC+01:00) | Montella 40', 53' | | Marcolini 85' | Stadium: Stadio Olimpico; Attendance: 42,500; Referee: Daniele Tombolini |

| 16 January 2005 19 | Atalanta | 1–1 | Siena | Bergamo |
| 15:00 CET (UTC+01:00) | Sinigaglia 20' | | Chiesa 45' | Stadium: Stadio Atleti Azzurri d'Italia; Attendance: 15,000; Referee: Massimo De Santis |

| 19 January 2005 16 | Messina | 1–0 | Atalanta | Messina |
| 20:30 CET (UTC+01:00) | Sullo 18' | | | Stadium: Stadio San Filippo; Attendance: 25,000; Referee: Matteo Trefoloni |

| 23 January 2005 20 | Lecce | 1–0 | Atalanta | Lecce |
| 15:00 CET (UTC+01:00) | Bojinov 33' | | | Stadium: Stadio Via del Mare; Attendance: 15,228; Referee: Marco Gabriele |

| 30 January 2005 21 | Atalanta | 1–2 | Juventus | Bergamo |
| 15:00 CET (UTC+01:00) | Thuram 90' (o.g.) | | Olivera 23'; Del Piero 80' (pen.) | Stadium: Stadio Atleti Azzurri d'Italia; Attendance: 25,000; Referee: Pierluigi Collina |

| 2 February 2005 22 | Internazionale | 1–0 | Atalanta | Milan |
| 20:30 CET (UTC+01:00) | Martins 33' | | | Stadium: San Siro; Attendance: 48,479; Referee: Salvatore Racalbuto |

| 6 February 2005 23 | Atalanta | 1–0 | Livorno | Bergamo |
| 15:00 CET (UTC+01:00) | Sala 23' | | | Stadium: Stadio Atleti Azzurri d'Italia; Attendance: 10,000; Referee: Nicola Rizzoli |

| 12 February 2005 24 | Lazio | 2–1 | Atalanta | Rome |
| 18:00 CET (UTC+01:00) | Bazzani 45+1'; Liverani 89' | | Makinwa 45' | Stadium: Stadio Olimpico; Attendance: 30,000; Referee: Christian Brighi |

| 20 February 2005 25 | Atalanta | 2–0 | Bologna | Bergamo |
| 15:00 CET (UTC+01:00) | Marcolini 24'; Makinwa 61' | | | Stadium: Stadio Atleti Azzurri d'Italia; Attendance: 10,000; Referee: Luca Palanca |

| 27 February 2005 26 | Cagliari | 3–3 | Atalanta | Cagliari |
| 15:00 CET (UTC+01:00) | Langella 10'; Mau. Esposito 43'; Abeijón 68' | | Sala 18'; Makinwa 61'; Marcolini 90' | Stadium: Stadio Sant'Elia; Attendance: 15,000; Referee: Nicola Ayroldi |

| 5 March 2005 27 | Atalanta | 1–2 | Milan | Bergamo |
| 18:00 CET (UTC+01:00) | Makinwa 73' | | Ambrosini 72'; Pirlo 90+4' | Stadium: Stadio Atleti Azzurri d'Italia; Attendance: 22,000; Referee: Paolo Bertini |

| 13 March 2005 28 | Atalanta | 1–0 | Parma | Bergamo |
| 15:00 CET (UTC+01:00) | Adriano Pereira 79' | | | Stadium: Stadio Atleti Azzurri d'Italia; Attendance: 15,000; Referee: Tiziano Pieri |

| 20 March 2005 29 | Sampdoria | 1–2 | Atalanta | Genoa |
| 15:00 CET (UTC+01:00) | Doni 30' | | Makinwa 3'; Natali 68' | Stadium: Stadio Luigi Ferraris; Attendance: 23,000; Referee: Stefano Farina |

| 10 April 2005 30 | Atalanta | 3–0 | Chievo | Bergamo |
| 15:00 CEST (UTC+02:00) | Marcolini 6'; Makinwa 15'; Montolivo 54' | | | Stadium: Stadio Atleti Azzurri d'Italia; Attendance: 22,000; Referee: Gianluca Paparesta |

| 17 April 2005 31 | Brescia | 1–0 | Atalanta | Brescia |
| 15:00 CEST (UTC+02:00) | Di Biagio 90+4' (pen.) | | | Stadium: Stadio Mario Rigamonti; Attendance: 7,500; Referee: Massimo De Santis |

| 20 April 2005 32 | Reggina | 0–0 | Atalanta | Reggio Calabria |
| 20:30 CEST (UTC+02:00) | | | | Stadium: Stadio Oreste Granillo; Attendance: 22,000; Referee: Tiziano Pieri |

| 24 April 2005 33 | Atalanta | 1–0 | Palermo | Bergamo |
| 15:00 CEST (UTC+02:00) | Sala 89' | | | Stadium: Stadio Atleti Azzurri d'Italia; Attendance: 14,000; Referee: Pasquale Rodomonti |

| 1 May 2005 34 | Udinese | 2–1 | Atalanta | Udine |
| 15:00 CEST (UTC+02:00) | Mauri 2'; Iaquinta 37' | | Lazzari 4' | Stadium: Stadio Friuli; Attendance: 17,000; Referee: Tiziano Pieri |

| 8 May 2005 35 | Atalanta | 2–1 | Messina | Bergamo |
| 15:00 CEST (UTC+02:00) | Adriano Pereira 49'; Bernardini 53' | | Zampagna 37' | Stadium: Stadio Atleti Azzurri d'Italia; Attendance: 12,000; Referee: Salvatore Racalbuto |

| 15 May 2005 36 | Fiorentina | 0–0 | Atalanta | Florence |
| 15:00 CEST (UTC+02:00) | | | | Stadium: Stadio Artemio Franchi; Attendance: 43,000; Referee: Pasquale Rodomonti |

| 22 May 2005 37 | Atalanta | 0–1 | Roma | Bergamo |
| 15:00 CEST (UTC+02:00) | | | Cassano 50' | Stadium: Stadio Atleti Azzurri d'Italia; Attendance: 16,000; Referee: Paolo Bertini |

| 29 May 2005 38 | Siena | 2–1 | Atalanta | Siena |
| 15:00 CEST (UTC+02:00) | Chiesa 8'; Argilli 80' | | Budan 62' | Stadium: Stadio Artemio Franchi; Attendance: 13,500; Referee: Stefano Farina |

==== Topscorers ====
- (Nigeria) Stephen Makinwa 6
- (Croatia) Igor Budan 5
- (Italy) Riccardo Montolivo 3
- (Italy) Giampaolo Pazzini 3
- (Italy) Michele Marcolini 3

=== Coppa Italia ===
==== Group stage ====
| Pos | Team | Pld | W | D | L | GF | GA | GD | Pts | Qualification |
|---|---|---|---|---|---|---|---|---|---|---|
| 1 | Atalanta | 3 | 2 | 1 | 0 | 9 | 4 | +5 | 7 | Advance to knockout phase |
| 2 | AlbinoLeffe | 3 | 2 | 0 | 1 | 3 | 3 | 0 | 6 | |
| 3 | Vicenza | 3 | 1 | 0 | 2 | 4 | 6 | −2 | 3 | |
| 4 | Pro Patria | 3 | 0 | 1 | 2 | 3 | 6 | −3 | 1 | |

| 14 August 2004 1 | Vicenza | 2–4 | Atalanta | Vicenza |
| 20:30 CEST (UTC+02:00) | Margiotta 26'; Schwoch 87' (pen.) | | Comandini 27' (pen.); Lazzari 78', 79'; Marcolini 90' | Stadium: Stadio Romeo Menti; Attendance: 3,000; Referee: Nicola Stefanini |

| 22 August 2004 2 | Atalanta | 3–0 | AlbinoLeffe | Bergamo |
| 20:30 CEST (UTC+02:00) | Pazzini 41'; Piá 42'; Lazzari 73' | | | Stadium: Stadio Atleti Azzurri d'Italia; Attendance: 5,000; Referee: Oscar Girardi |

| 29 August 2004 3 | Pro Patria | 2–2 | Atalanta | Busto Arsizio |
| 20:30 CEST (UTC+02:00) | Perfetti 73'; Temelin 80' | | Pazzini 50', 70' | Stadium: Stadio Carlo Speroni; Attendance: 3,000; Referee: Emidio Morganti |

==== Knockout stage ====
===== Round of 32 =====
| 16 September 2004 First leg | Atalanta | 4–1 | Reggina | Bergamo |
| 20:30 CEST (UTC+02:00) | Budan 23'; Sala 31'; Albertini 64'; Lazzari 90+2' | | Borriello 25' | Stadium: Stadio Atleti Azzurri d'Italia; Attendance: 3,200; Referee: Alberto Castellani |

| 28 September 2004 Second leg | Reggina | 2–3 (3–7 agg.) | Atalanta | Reggio Calabria |
| 15:00 CEST (UTC+02:00) | Dionigi 26', 46' | | Saudati 4'; Bernardini 24' (pen.), 68' | Stadium: Stadio Oreste Granillo; Attendance: 940; Referee: Paolo Tagliavento |

===== Round of 16 =====
| 19 November 2004 First leg | Atalanta | 2–0 | Juventus | Bergamo |
| 21:00 CET (UTC+01:00) | Lazzari 58', 75' | | | Stadium: Stadio Atleti Azzurri d'Italia; Attendance: 10,000; Referee: Mauro Bergonzi |

| 13 January 2005 Second leg | Juventus | 3–3 (3–5 agg.) | Atalanta | Turin |
| 21:00 CET (UTC+01:00) | Natali 4' (o.g.); Zalayeta 33'; Trezeguet 79' | | Lazzari 10', 43', 90+1' | Stadium: Stadio delle Alpi; Attendance: 4,822; Referee: Nicola Ayroldi |

===== Quarter-finals =====
| 27 January 2005 First leg | Atalanta | 0–1 | Internazionale | Bergamo |
| 21:00 CET (UTC+01:00) | | | Martins 81' | Stadium: Stadio Atleti Azzurri d'Italia; Attendance: 5,000; Referee: Luca Palanca |

| 16 February 2005 Second leg | Internazionale | 3–0 (4–0 agg.) | Atalanta | Milan |
| 17:30 CET (UTC+01:00) | Recoba 31'; Emre 36'; Cruz 55' | | | Stadium: San Siro; Attendance: 10,000; Referee: Nicola Rizzoli |
