= 2005–06 Atalanta BC season =

Atalanta
2005–06 season
- President: Ivan Ruggeri
- Head coach: Stefano Colantuono
- Stadium: Stadio Atleti Azzurri d'Italia
- Serie B: 1st (promoted)
- Coppa Italia: Round of 16
- Top goalscorer: League: Nicola Ventola (15); All: Nicola Ventola (15)

The 2005–06 season was the 99th season in the existence of Atalanta BC and the club's first season back in the second division of Italian football. In addition to the domestic league, Atalanta participated in this season's edition of the Coppa Italia.

== Competitions ==
=== Overall record ===
Competition	First match	Last match	Starting round	Final position	Record							
Competition	First match	Last match	Starting round	Final position	Pld	W	D	L	GF	GA	GD	Win %
Serie B	4 September 2005	28 May 2006	Matchday 1	Winners	42	24	9	9	61	39	+22	57.14
Coppa Italia	7 August 2005	11 January 2006	First round	Round of 16	5	4	0	1	8	3	+5	80.00
Total					47	28	9	10	69	42	+27	59.57

Source: Competitions

=== Serie B ===
==== League table ====
Pos	Team	Pld	W	D	L	GF	GA	GD	Pts	Promotion or relegation
1	Atalanta (P, C)	42	24	9	9	61	39	+22	81	Promotion to Serie A
2	Catania (P)	42	22	12	8	67	42	+25	78	Promotion to Serie A
3	Torino (O, P)	42	21	13	8	51	31	+20	76	Qualification to promotion play-offs
4	Mantova	42	18	15	9	46	35	+11	69	Qualification to promotion play-offs
5	Modena	42	17	16	9	59	41	+18	67	Qualification to promotion play-offs

Source: Almanacco Illustrato del Calcio 2007, Panini Edizioni, Modena, November 2006
Rules for classification: 1) points; 2) head-to-head points; 3) head-to-head goal difference; 4) head-to-head goals scored; 5) goal difference; 6) number of goals scored.
(C) Champions; (O) Play-off winners; (P) Promoted

==== Results summary ====
Overall								Home						Away					
Pld	W	D	L	GF	GA	GD	Pts	W	D	L	GF	GA	GD	W	D	L	GF	GA	GD
42	24	9	9	61	39	+22	81	18	1	2	38	11	+27	6	8	7	23	28	−5

Source: Serie B

==== Results by round ====
Round	1	2	3	4	5	6	7	8	9	10	11	12	13	14	15	16	17	18	19	20	21	22	23	24	25	26	27	28	29	30	31	32	33	34	35	36	37	38	39	40	41	42
Ground	A	H	A	H	H	A	H	A	H	A	A	H	A	H	A	H	A	H	A	H	A	H	A	H	A	A	H	A	H	A	H	H	A	H	A	H	A	H	A	H	A	H
Result	W	W	L	W	W	L	W	L	W	L	L	W	D	W	W	W	L	W	L	W	D	D	W	W	W	D	L	D	W	W	W	W	D	W	D	W	D	W	W	W	D	L
Position	3	1	3	2	1	3	3	6	5	6	6	5	4	4	3	3	3	3	4	3	4	4	3	3	2	2	3	3	2	2	2	1	1	1	1	1	1	1	1	1	1	1

Source: Serie B
A = Away; H = Home; W = Win; D = Draw; L = Loss

==== Matches ====
Win Draw Loss

4 September 2005 2	Atalanta	3–2	Hellas Verona	Bergamo
15:00 CEST (UTC+2)	Soncin 41'; Bernardini 44'; Bellini 80'		Adaílton 38'; Sforzini 77'	Stadium: Stadio Atleti Azzurri d'Italia; Attendance: 9,833; Referee: Marco Gabriele

7 September 2005 1	Cesena	0–2	Atalanta	Cesena
20:30 CEST (UTC+2)			Saudati 45'; Defendi 85'	Stadium: Stadio Dino Manuzzi; Attendance: 5,075; Referee: Diego Preschern

10 September 2005 4	Atalanta	1–0	Triestina	Bergamo
16:00 CEST (UTC+2)	Lazzari 51'			Stadium: Stadio Atleti Azzurri d'Italia; Attendance: 8,575; Referee: Christian Brighi

17 September 2005 5	Atalanta	2–1	Torino	Bergamo
16:00 CEST (UTC+2)	Ventola 19'; Loria 55'		Stellone 61'	Stadium: Stadio Atleti Azzurri d'Italia; Attendance: 9,513; Referee: Stefano Farina

20 September 2005 6	Catania	4–1	Atalanta	Catania
20:30 CEST (UTC+2)	Spinesi 18', 45', 51'; Caserta 90+3'		Terra 54'	Stadium: Stadio Angelo Massimino; Attendance: 14,642; Referee: Gianluca Paparesta

24 September 2005 7	Atalanta	2–0	Ternana	Bergamo
15:00 CEST (UTC+2)	Lazzari 54'; Defendi 76'			Stadium: Stadio Atleti Azzurri d'Italia; Attendance: 8,960; Referee: Francesco Squillace

30 September 2005 8	Mantova	1–0	Atalanta	Mantua
20:45 CEST (UTC+2)	Cioffi 42'			Stadium: Stadio Danilo Martelli; Attendance: 13,926; Referee: Pasquale Rodomonti

5 October 2005 3	Piacenza	3–0	Atalanta	Piacenza
20:30 CEST (UTC+2)	Cacia 17'; Campagnaro 37'; Ganci 77'			Stadium: Stadio Leonardo Garilli; Attendance: 4,832; Referee: Paolo Bertini

9 October 2005 9	Atalanta	2–0	AlbinoLeffe	Bergamo
15:00 CEST (UTC+2)	Ventola 28', 57'			Stadium: Stadio Atleti Azzurri d'Italia; Attendance: 10,223; Referee: Daniele Tombolini

15 October 2005 10	Bari	2–1	Atalanta	Bari
16:00 CEST (UTC+2)	Sibilano 27'; Gazzi 90+3'		Soncin 16'	Stadium: Stadio San Nicola; Attendance: 5,277; Referee: Oberdan Pantana

22 October 2005 11	Crotone	1–0	Atalanta	Crotone
16:00 CEST (UTC+2)	Scarlato 72'			Stadium: Stadio Ezio Scida; Attendance: 4,813; Referee: Diego Preschern

25 October 2005 12	Atalanta	1–0	Bologna	Bergamo
20:30 CEST (UTC+2)	Ventola 1'			Stadium: Stadio Atleti Azzurri d'Italia; Attendance: 9.665; Referee: Paolo Tagliavento

29 October 2005 13	Vicenza	3–3	Atalanta	Vicenza
16:00 CEST (UTC+2)	González 2'; Carbone 11', 90'		Ventola 29'; Soncin 32', 73'	Stadium: Stadio Romeo Menti; Attendance: 5,144; Referee: Francesco Squillace

5 November 2005 14	Atalanta	3–0	Rimini	Bergamo
15:00 CET (UTC+1)	Loria 69'; Saudati 78'; Bombardini 83'			Stadium: Stadio Atleti Azzurri d'Italia; Attendance: 8,480; Referee: Giorgio Lops

11 November 2005 15	Cremonese	0–1	Atalanta	Cremona
20:45 CET (UTC+1)			Migliaccio 83'	Stadium: Stadio Giovanni Zini; Attendance: 3,771; Referee: Paolo Dondarini

19 November 2005 16	Atalanta	2–0	Avellino	Bergamo
16:00 CET (UTC+1)	Ventola 43'; Soncin 84'			Stadium: Stadio Atleti Azzurri d'Italia; Attendance: 8,836; Referee: Andrea Romeo

26 November 2005 17	Brescia	1–0	Atalanta	Brescia
16:00 CET (UTC+1)	Possanzini 30'			Stadium: Stadio Mario Rigamonti; Attendance: 5,741; Referee: Antonio Dattilo

5 December 2005 18	Atalanta	3–1	Catanzaro	Bergamo
20:45 CET (UTC+1)	Marcolini 43'; Rivalta 73'; Ventola 85'		Corona 27'	Stadium: Stadio Atleti Azzurri d'Italia; Attendance: 8,511; Referee: Gianluca Rocchi

10 December 2005 19	Arezzo	2–0	Atalanta	Arezzo
16:00 CET (UTC+1)	Raimondi 36'; Floro Flores 78'			Stadium: Stadio Città di Arezzo; Attendance: 5,741; Referee: Paolo Dondarini

17 December 2005 20	Atalanta	3–0	Pescara	Bergamo
16:00 CET (UTC+1)	Ariatti 52'; Loria 63'; Saudati 86'			Stadium: Stadio Atleti Azzurri d'Italia; Attendance: 7,912; Referee: Andrea Romeo

20 December 2005 21	Modena	2–2	Atalanta	Modena
20:30 CET (UTC+1)	Tisci 20'; Bucchi 70'		D'Agostino 53'; Ventola 64'	Stadium: Stadio Alberto Braglia; Attendance: 6,289; Referee: Rocchi

7 January 2006 22	Atalanta	2–2	Cesena	Bergamo
16:00 CET (UTC+1)	Rivalta 6'; Ventola 68'		Ciaramitaro 11'; Bernacci 44'	Stadium: Stadio Atleti Azzurri d'Italia; Attendance: 9,980; Referee: Emidio Morganti

14 January 2006 23	Hellas Verona	0–1	Atalanta	Verona
16:00 CET (UTC+1)			Lazzari 45'	Stadium: Stadio Marcantonio Bentegodi; Attendance: 9,265; Referee: Massimo De Santis

17 January 2006 24	Atalanta	2–1	Piacenza	Bergamo
20:30 CET (UTC+1)	Loria 61'; Zampagna 82'		Margiotta 75'	Stadium: Stadio Atleti Azzurri d'Italia; Attendance: 8,132; Referee: Maurizio Ciampi

21 January 2006 25	Triestina	1–2	Atalanta	Trieste
16:00 CET (UTC+1)	Tulli 68' (pen.)		Ventola 11'; Migliaccio 37'	Stadium: Stadio Nereo Rocco; Attendance: 5,510; Referee: Oscar Girardi

30 January 2006 26	Torino	2–2	Atalanta	Turin
20:45 CET (UTC+1)	Rosina 20', 82'		Ventola 67', 71'	Stadium: Stadio delle Alpi; Attendance: 23,013; Referee: Stefano Farina

4 February 2006 27	Atalanta	1–2	Catania	Bergamo
20:30 CET (UTC+1)	Defendi 38'		Biso 52'; Mascara 76'	Stadium: Stadio Atleti Azzurri d'Italia; Attendance: 11,736; Referee: Paolo Dondarini

7 February 2006 28	Ternana	0–0	Atalanta	Terni
16:00 CET (UTC+1)				Stadium: Stadio Libero Liberati; Attendance: 2,980; Referee: Paolo Bertini

11 February 2006 29	Atalanta	2–1	Mantova	Bergamo
16:00 CET (UTC+1)	Rivalta 47'; D'Agostino 88'		Lanzara 26'	Stadium: Stadio Atleti Azzurri d'Italia; Attendance: 12,933; Referee: Matteo Trefoloni

27 February 2006 30	AlbinoLeffe	2–3	Atalanta	Bergamo
20:45 CET (UTC+1)	Poloni 45'; Regonesi 65'		Zampagna 5', 50'; Loria 57'	Stadium: Stadio Atleti Azzurri d'Italia; Attendance: 9,680; Referee: Roberto Rosetti

4 March 2006 31	Atalanta	1–0	Bari	Bergamo
16:00 CET (UTC+1)	Ventola 36' (pen.)			Stadium: Stadio Atleti Azzurri d'Italia; Attendance: 8,233; Referee: Luca Palanca

12 March 2006 32	Atalanta	1–0	Crotone	Bergamo
16:00 CET (UTC+1)	Defendi 75'			Stadium: Stadio Atleti Azzurri d'Italia; Attendance: 9,157; Referee: Paolo Bertini

20 March 2006 33	Bologna	1–1	Atalanta	Bologna
20:45 CET (UTC+1)	Zauli 48'		Ventola 70'	Stadium: Stadio Renato Dall'Ara; Attendance: 10,803; Referee: Roberto Rosetti

25 March 2006 34	Atalanta	1–0	Vicenza	Bergamo
16:00 CET (UTC+1)	Marcolini 73'			Stadium: Stadio Atleti Azzurri d'Italia; Attendance: 8,234; Referee: Christian Brighi

2 April 2006 35	Rimini	0–0	Atalanta	Rimini
16:00 CEST (UTC+2)				Stadium: Stadio Romeo Neri; Attendance: 6,553; Referee: Oscar Girardi

8 April 2006 36	Atalanta	2–0	Cremonese	Bergamo
16:00 CEST (UTC+2)	Lazzari 46'; Ventola 55'			Stadium: Stadio Atleti Azzurri d'Italia; Attendance: 8,786; Referee: Mauro Bergonzi

22 April 2006 37	Avellino	0–0	Atalanta	Avellino
20:45 CEST (UTC+2)				Stadium: Stadio Partenio; Attendance: 8,699; Referee: Paolo Tagliavento

29 April 2006 38	Atalanta	2–0	Brescia	Bergamo
16:00 CEST (UTC+2)	Loria 9'; Zampagna 42'			Stadium: Stadio Atleti Azzurri d'Italia; Attendance: 14,289; Referee: Stefano Farina

6 May 2006 39	Catanzaro	1–2	Atalanta	Catanzaro
16:00 CEST (UTC+2)	Teoldi 52'		Zampagna 21', 53'	Stadium: Stadio Nicola Ceravolo; Attendance: 3,807; Referee: Nicola Ayroldi

13 May 2006 40	Atalanta	2–0	Arezzo	Bergamo
16:00 CEST (UTC+2)	Adriano 47'; Soncin 89'			Stadium: Stadio Atleti Azzurri d'Italia; Attendance: 13,093; Referee: Salvatore Racalbuto

21 May 2006 41	Pescara	2–2	Atalanta	Pescara
16:00 CEST (UTC+2)	Cammarata 50'; Bonfiglio 70'		Soncin 62'; Osvaldo 81'	Stadium: Stadio Adriatico

28 May 2006 42	Atalanta	0–1	Modena	Bergamo
16:00 CEST (UTC+2)			Bucchi 84' (pen.)	Stadium: Stadio Atleti Azzurri d'Italia; Attendance: 18,957; Referee: Mauro Bergonzi

=== Coppa Italia ===
7 August 2005 First round	Massese	0–1	Atalanta	Massa
17:00 CEST (UTC+2)			Soncin 57'	Stadium: Stadio degli Oliveti; Attendance: 3,200; Referee: Matteo Trefoloni

14 August 2005 Second round	Pisa	0–1	Atalanta	Pisa
20:30 CEST (UTC+2)			Loria 81'	Stadium: Arena Garibaldi; Attendance: 7,000; Referee: Oberdan Pantana

21 August 2005 Third round	Siena	0–4	Atalanta	Siena
20:00 CEST (UTC+2)			Soncin 18', 41'; Lazzari 59'; Defendi 73'	Stadium: Stadio Artemio Franchi; Attendance: 1,251; Referee: Mauro Bergonzi

30 November 2005 Round of 16; First leg	Atalanta	1–0	Udinese	Bergamo
20:45 CET (UTC+1)	D'Agostino 53'			Stadium: Stadio Atleti Azzurri d'Italia; Attendance: 2,199; Referee: Paparesta

11 January 2006 Round of 16; Second leg	Udinese	3–1 (3–2 agg.)	Atalanta	Udine
16:30 CET (UTC+1)	Mauri 17'; Pieri 78'; Di Natale 81' (pen.)		Ariatti 69'	Stadium: Stadio Friuli; Attendance: 753; Referee: Paolo Tagliavento
