= 2008–09 Atalanta BC season =

Atalanta
2008–09 season
- Chairman: Ivan Ruggeri
- Manager: Luigi Delneri
- Serie A: 11th
- Coppa Italia: Fourth round
- Top goalscorer: League: Sergio Floccari (12); All: Sergio Floccari (12)
Home colours	Away colours	Third colours

The 2008–09 season was the 102nd season in the history of Atalanta BC and the club's third consecutive season in the top flight of Italian football. In addition to the domestic league, Atalanta participated in this season's edition of the Coppa Italia.

== Squad ==
As of 2009-02-02

Note: Flags indicate national team as defined under FIFA eligibility rules; some limited exceptions apply. Players may hold more than one non-FIFA nationality.

No.	Pos.	Nation	Player
1	GK	ITA	Andrea Consigli
2	DF	ARG	Leonardo Talamonti
5	DF	ITA	Thomas Manfredini
6	DF	ITA	Gianpaolo Bellini
8	DF	AUT	György Garics
9	FW	ITA	Gianvito Plasmati (on loan from Catania)
11	FW	ITA	Alessio Cerci (on loan from Roma)
13	DF	ITA	Federico Peluso
15	MF	ITA	Diego De Ascentis
17	MF	ITA	Tiberio Guarente
20	MF	CHI	Jaime Valdés
21	MF	ITA	Luca Cigarini
22	MF	ITA	Simone Padoin

No.	Pos.	Nation	Player
23	MF	POR	Costinha
26	DF	ARG	Maximiliano Pellegrino
27	DF	ITA	Daniele Capelli
31	GK	ITA	Ferdinando Coppola
32	FW	ITA	Christian Vieri
33	FW	ITA	Sergio Floccari
34	FW	ITA	Marino Defendi
46	MF	ITA	Simone Cerea (from youth team)
55	MF	ITA	Francesco Parravicini (on loan from Parma)
72	MF	ITA	Cristiano Doni (captain)
79	MF	BRA	Adriano Ferreira Pinto
91	GK	ITA	Simone Colombi (from youth team)

== Transfers ==
=== January 2009 ===
In: Note: Flags indicate national team as defined under FIFA eligibility rules; some limited exceptions apply. Players may hold more than one non-FIFA nationality.

No.	Pos.	Nation	Player
13	DF	ITA	Federico Peluso (from AlbinoLeffe, €1,000,000)
9	FW	ITA	Gianvito Plasmati (from Catania, loan)
55	MF	ITA	Francesco Parravicini (from Parma, loan)

Out: Note: Flags indicate national team as defined under FIFA eligibility rules; some limited exceptions apply. Players may hold more than one non-FIFA nationality.

No.	Pos.	Nation	Player
—	FW	GUI	Karamoko Cissé (to AlbinoLeffe, €500,000, co-ownership)
—	DF	ITA	Claudio Rivalta (to Torino, undisclosed)

Out on loan: Note: Flags indicate national team as defined under FIFA eligibility rules; some limited exceptions apply. Players may hold more than one non-FIFA nationality.

No.	Pos.	Nation	Player
—	FW	ITA	Michele Marconi (to Grosseto)
—	MF	ITA	Giacomo Bonaventura (to Pergocrema)
—	MF	ITA	Alessio Manzoni (to Parma)
—	MF	ITA	Antonino D'Agostino (to Parma)

=== Summer 2008 ===
In: Note: Flags indicate national team as defined under FIFA eligibility rules; some limited exceptions apply. Players may hold more than one non-FIFA nationality.

No.	Pos.	Nation	Player
20	MF	CHI	Jaime Valdés (from Lecce, Free)
34	FW	ITA	Marino Defendi (from Chievo, loan return)
—	DF	ITA	~~Dario Bergamelli~~ (from Manfredonia, loan return)
32	FW	ITA	Christian Vieri (from Fiorentina, Free)
—	MF	ITA	~~Christian Tiboni~~ (from Sassuolo, loan return)
1	GK	ITA	Andrea Consigli (from Rimini, loan return)
8	DF	AUT	György Garics (from Napoli, €1,800,000, co-ownership)
7	MF	ITA	Alessio Manzoni (from Spezia, loan return)
—	FW	ITA	~~Andrea Lazzari~~ (from Grosseto, loan return)
21	MF	ITA	Luca Cigarini (from Parma, €5,000,000, co-ownership)
11	MF	ITA	Alessio Cerci (from Roma, loan)
9	FW	GUI	Karamoko Cissé (from Hellas Verona, loan return)

Out: Note: Flags indicate national team as defined under FIFA eligibility rules; some limited exceptions apply. Players may hold more than one non-FIFA nationality.

No.	Pos.	Nation	Player
—	FW	ITA	Antonio Langella (to Udinese, Free)
—	DF	ITA	Manuel Belleri (to Lazio, loan return)
—	DF	ITA	Riccardo Fissore (to Vicenza, loan return)
—	FW	ITA	Simone Inzaghi (to Lazio, loan return)
—	FW	ITA	Michele Paolucci (to Udinese, loan return)
—	DF	ITA	Moris Carrozzieri (to Palermo, €4,000,000)
—	MF	ARG	Fernando Tissone (to Udinese, €4,200,000, co-ownership buyout)
—	FW	ITA	Andrea Lazzari (to Cagliari, €2,000,000, co-ownership)
—	GK	ITA	Andrea Ivan (released)
—	FW	BIH	Zlatan Muslimović (to (Greece) PAOK, €3,000,000)
—	GK	PER	George Forsyth (to (Peru) Alianza Lima, €2,000,000)

Out on loan: Note: Flags indicate national team as defined under FIFA eligibility rules; some limited exceptions apply. Players may hold more than one non-FIFA nationality.

No.	Pos.	Nation	Player
—	MF	ITA	Luisito Campisi (to Hellas Verona)
—	FW	ITA	Michael Cia (to Triestina)
—	MF	ITA	Christian Tiboni (to Hellas Verona)
—	GK	ITA	Matteo Andreoletti (to Lecco)
—	DF	ITA	Dario Bergamelli (to Sassuolo)
—	DF	ITA	Gabriele Perico (to Poggibonsi)
—	FW	ITA	Alberto Filippini (to Padova)
—	DF	ITA	Stefano Mauri (to Ternana)
—	MF	SRB	Ivan Radovanović (to Pisa)

== Pre-season and friendlies ==
5 August 2008	Atalanta	7–0	Team Veneto	Bergamo
	Valdés 9', 12' (pen.), 32'; Colombo 21' (o.g.); D'Agostino 65'; Ferreira Pinto 73'; Vukomanović 78' (o.g.)	Report		Stadium: Stadio Atleti Azzurri d'Italia

9 August 2008	Mons (Belgium)	0–2	(Italy) Atalanta	Mons, Belgium
		Report	Floccari 1'; Doni 34'	Stadium: Stade Charles Tondreau

13 August 2008	Atalanta	5–0	AlzanoCene	Bergamo
	Valdés, Marconi, Cissé	Report		Stadium: Stadio Atleti Azzurri d'Italia

15 August 2008	Atalanta	abd.	Legnano	Bergamo
	Valdés 3'; Guarente 8'; Floccari 38'	Report		Stadium: Stadio Atleti Azzurri d'Italia
Note: Match abandoned at half-time due to a bad weather. The score at the time was a 3–0.

20 August 2008	Atalanta	6–1	Merate	Bergamo
	Padoin 7'; Rivalta 21'; De Ascentis 25', 43'; Manfredini 31'; Manzoni 59'	Report	Pereira 90' (pen.)	Stadium: Stadio Atleti Azzurri d'Italia; Referee: Massimo Ballini

28 August 2008	Atalanta	3–2	Villa d'Adda	Bergamo
	Floccari 10'; Guarente 31'; Padoin 50'	Report	Pesenti 22' (pen.); Posenato 65'	Stadium: Stadio Atleti Azzurri d'Italia

== Competitions ==
=== Serie A ===
==== League table ====
Pos	Team	Pld	W	D	L	GF	GA	GD	Pts	Qualification or relegation
9	Cagliari	38	15	8	15	49	50	−1	53	
10	Lazio	38	15	5	18	46	55	−9	50	Qualification to Europa League play-off round (Note: Lazio qualified for the play-off round of the 2009–10 UEFA Europa League by winning the 2008–09 Coppa Italia.)
11	Atalanta	38	13	8	17	45	48	−3	47	
12	Napoli	38	12	10	16	43	45	−2	46 (Note: Napoli finished ahead of Sampdoria on head-to-head points: Napoli 2–0 Sampdoria, Sampdoria 2–2 Napoli.)	
13	Sampdoria	38	11	13	14	49	52	−3	46	

Source: lega-calcio.it (in Italian)
Rules for classification: 1) points; 2) head-to-head points; 3) head-to-head goal difference; 4) head-to-head goals scored; 5) goal difference; 6) number of goals scored.

==== Results summary ====
Overall								Home						Away					
Pld	W	D	L	GF	GA	GD	Pts	W	D	L	GF	GA	GD	W	D	L	GF	GA	GD
38	13	8	17	45	48	−3	47	10	3	6	28	17	+11	3	5	11	17	31	−14

Last updated: 31 May 2009.
Source: Competitive matches

==== Results by round ====
Round	1	2	3	4	5	6	7	8	9	10	11	12	13	14	15	16	17	18	19	20	21	22	23	24	25	26	27	28	29	30	31	32	33	34	35	36	37	38
Ground	H	A	A	H	A	H	A	H	A	H	A	H	A	H	H	A	H	A	H	A	H	H	A	H	A	H	A	H	A	H	A	H	A	A	H	A	H	A
Result	W	W	L	W	L	W	D	L	L	D	L	W	L	W	W	D	L	L	W	L	L	W	W	W	L	L	L	W	D	L	D	L	W	L	D	D	D	L
Position	6	2	6	3	9	5	8	9	10	11	11	10	10	10	7	8	10	11	10	11	11	11	10	8	8	9	10	10	10	10	10	11	11	11	11	11	11	11

Updated to match(es) played on 31 May 2009. Source: Competitive matches
A = Away; H = Home; W = Win; D = Draw; L = Loss

==== Matches ====
31 August 2008 1	Atalanta	1–0	Siena	Bergamo
15:00 CEST (UTC+02:00)	Padoin 15'		Maccarone (yellow card) 55' (yellow-red card) 88'	Stadium: Stadio Atleti Azzurri d'Italia; Attendance: 11,682; Referee: Carmine Russo

14 September 2008 2	Bologna	0–1	Atalanta	Bologna
15:00 CEST (UTC+02:00)			Guarente 9'	Stadium: Stadio Renato Dall'Ara; Attendance: 17,849; Referee: Paolo Valeri

20 September 2008 3	Catania	1–0	Atalanta	Catania
18:00 CEST (UTC+02:00)	Paolucci 60'			Stadium: Stadio Angelo Massimino; Attendance: 17,246; Referee: Maurizio Ciampi

24 September 2008 4	Atalanta	1–0	Cagliari	Bergamo
20:30 CEST (UTC+02:00)	Floccari 79'			Stadium: Stadio Atleti Azzurri d'Italia; Attendance: 11,846; Referee: Nicola Stefanini

28 September 2008 5	Roma	2–0	Atalanta	Rome
15:00 CEST (UTC+02:00)	Panucci 17'; Vučinić 31'			Stadium: Stadio Olimpico; Attendance: 30,366; Referee: Paolo Tagliavento

5 October 2008 6	Atalanta	4–2	Sampdoria	Bergamo
15:00 CEST (UTC+02:00)	Floccari 35', 77'; Garics 39'; Doni 83'		Cassano 7', 54' (pen.); Accardi (yellow card) 47' (yellow-red card) 73'; Dessena (red card) 82'	Stadium: Stadio Atleti Azzurri d'Italia; Attendance: 12,020; Referee: Oscar Girardi

19 October 2008 7	Chievo	1–1	Atalanta	Verona
15:00 CEST (UTC+02:00)	Mantovani 45+4'		Ferreira Pinto 62'	Stadium: Stadio Marc'Antonio Bentegodi; Attendance: 11,462; Referee: Paolo Valeri

26 October 2008 8	Atalanta	0–1	Milan	Bergamo
15:00 CET (UTC+01:00)			Kaká 80'	Stadium: Stadio Atleti Azzurri d'Italia; Attendance: 20,899; Referee: Stefano Farina

29 October 2008 9	Torino	2–1	Atalanta	Turin
20:30 CET (UTC+01:00)	Amoruso 62'; Stellone 64'		Floccari 66'	Stadium: Stadio Olimpico; Attendance: 14,919; Referee: Andrea De Marco

2 November 2008 10	Atalanta	0–0	Lecce	Bergamo
15:00 CET (UTC+01:00)				Stadium: Stadio Atleti Azzurri d'Italia; Attendance: 10,236; Referee: Luca Marelli

9 November 2008 11	Fiorentina	2–1	Atalanta	Florence
15:00 CET (UTC+01:00)	Melo 20'; Gilardino 23'		Floccari 76'	Stadium: Stadio Artemio Franchi; Attendance: 27,884; Referee: Antonio Damato

16 November 2008 12	Atalanta	3–1	Napoli	Bergamo
15:00 CET (UTC+01:00)	Ferreira Pinto 64'; Manfredini 89'; Floccari 90+1'		Hamšík 72' (pen.)	Stadium: Stadio Atleti Azzurri d'Italia; Attendance: 11,707; Referee: Christian Brighi

23 November 2008 13	Reggina	3–1	Atalanta	Reggio Calabria
15:00 CET (UTC+01:00)	Cozza 10'; Corradi 21', 79'		Doni 90+4'	Stadium: Stadio Oreste Granillo; Attendance: 11,850; Referee: Matteo Trefoloni

30 November 2008 14	Atalanta	2–0	Lazio	Bergamo
15:00 CET (UTC+01:00)	Valdés 54'; Floccari 68'			Stadium: Stadio Atleti Azzurri d'Italia; Attendance: 12,000; Referee: Mauro Bergonzi

7 December 2008 15	Atalanta	3–0	Udinese	Bergamo
15:00 CET (UTC+01:00)	Valdés 20'; Doni 78'; Vieri 88'			Stadium: Stadio Atleti Azzurri d'Italia; Attendance: 12,400; Referee: Carmine Russo

14 December 2008 16	Genoa	1–1	Atalanta	Genoa
15:00 CET (UTC+01:00)	Sculli 86'		Floccari 17'	Stadium: Stadio Luigi Ferraris; Attendance: 25,200; Referee: Antonio Giannoccaro

21 December 2008 17	Atalanta	1–3	Juventus	Bergamo
15:00 CET (UTC+01:00)	Vieri 48'		Del Piero 30'; Legrottaglie 37'; Amauri 81'	Stadium: Stadio Atleti Azzurri d'Italia; Attendance: 21,814; Referee: Stefano Farina

11 January 2009 18	Palermo	3–2	Atalanta	Palermo
15:00 CET (UTC+01:00)	Miccoli 22'; Bresciano 39'; Cavani 81'		Floccari 65'; Ferreira Pinto 78'	Stadium: Stadio Renzo Barbera; Attendance: 19,004; Referee: Oscar Girardi

18 January 2009 19	Atalanta	3–1	Internazionale	Bergamo
15:00 CET (UTC+01:00)	Floccari 18'; Doni 28', 33'		Ibrahimović 90+2'	Stadium: Stadio Atleti Azzurri d'Italia; Attendance: 16,983; Referee: Nicola Rizzoli

25 January 2009 20	Siena	1–0	Atalanta	Siena
15:00 CET (UTC+01:00)	Frick 44'			Stadium: Stadio Artemio Franchi; Attendance: 9,600; Referee: Renzo Candussio

28 January 2009 21	Atalanta	0–1	Bologna	Bergamo
20:30 CET (UTC+01:00)			Volpi 80'	Stadium: Stadio Atleti Azzurri d'Italia; Attendance: 10,672; Referee: Antonio Giannoccaro

31 January 2009 22	Atalanta	1–0	Catania	Bergamo
15:15 CET (UTC+01:00)	Guarente 24'			Stadium: Stadio Atleti Azzurri d'Italia; Attendance: 11,946; Referee: Paolo Dondarini

8 February 2009 23	Cagliari	0–1	Atalanta	Cagliari
15:00 CET (UTC+01:00)			Cigarini 66'	Stadium: Stadio Sant'Elia; Attendance: 9,800; Referee: Riccardo Tozzi

15 February 2009 24	Atalanta	3–0	Roma	Bergamo
15:00 CET (UTC+01:00)	Capelli 53'; Doni 56', 59'			Stadium: Stadio Atleti Azzurri d'Italia; Attendance: 7,503; Referee: Emidio Morganti

22 February 2009 25	Sampdoria	1–0	Atalanta	Genoa
15:00 CET (UTC+01:00)	Pazzini 61'			Stadium: Stadio Luigi Ferraris; Attendance: 25,200; Referee: Antonio Giannoccaro

1 March 2009 26	Atalanta	0–2	Chievo	Bergamo
15:00 CET (UTC+01:00)			Langella 78'; Pellissier 89' (pen.)	Stadium: Stadio Atleti Azzurri d'Italia; Attendance: 10,800; Referee: Paolo Dondarini

8 March 2009 27	Milan	3–0	Atalanta	Milan
15:00 CET (UTC+01:00)	Inzaghi 7', 71', 74'			Stadium: San Siro; Attendance: 54,645; Referee: Daniele Orsato

15 March 2009 28	Atalanta	2–0	Torino	Bergamo
15:00 CET (UTC+01:00)	Floccari 46', 73'			Stadium: Stadio Atleti Azzurri d'Italia; Attendance: 10,844; Referee: Massimiliano Saccani

22 March 2009 29	Lecce	2–2	Atalanta	Lecce
15:00 CET (UTC+01:00)	Caserta 9', 90+1'		Padoin 30', 48'	Stadium: Stadio Via del Mare; Attendance: 7,534; Referee: Paolo Dondarini

5 April 2009 30	Atalanta	1–2	Fiorentina	Bergamo
13:00 CEST (UTC+02:00)	Plasmati 50'		Jovetić 59' (pen.); Gilardino 90'	Stadium: Stadio Atleti Azzurri d'Italia; Attendance: 12,083; Referee: Matteo Trefoloni

11 April 2009 31	Napoli	0–0	Atalanta	Naples
15:00 CEST (UTC+02:00)				Stadium: Stadio San Paolo; Attendance: 36,773; Referee: Dino Tommasi

19 April 2009 32	Atalanta	0–1	Reggina	Bergamo
15:00 CEST (UTC+02:00)			Ceravolo 41'	Stadium: Stadio Atleti Azzurri d'Italia; Attendance: 9,800; Referee: Nicola Rizzoli

26 April 2009 33	Lazio	0–1	Atalanta	Rome
15:00 CEST (UTC+02:00)			Talamonti 24'	Stadium: Stadio Olimpico; Attendance: 28,380; Referee: Andrea Romeo

3 May 2009 34	Udinese	3–0	Atalanta	Udine
15:00 CEST (UTC+02:00)	Quagliarella 42', 74'; Pasquale 90'			Stadium: Stadio Friuli; Attendance: 16,305; Referee: Nicola Pierpaoli

10 May 2009 35	Atalanta	1–1	Genoa	Bergamo
15:00 CEST (UTC+02:00)	Valdés 9'		Criscito 90'	Stadium: Stadio Atleti Azzurri d'Italia; Attendance: 10,812; Referee: Roberto Rosetti

17 May 2009 36	Juventus	2–2	Atalanta	Turin
15:00 CEST (UTC+02:00)	Iaquinta 25'; Zanetti 36'		Cigarini 2'; Pellegrino 44'	Stadium: Stadio Olimpico; Attendance: 0 Referee: Nicola Ayroldi

24 May 2009 37	Atalanta	2–2	Palermo	Bergamo
15:00 CEST (UTC+02:00)	Plasmati 49', 67'		Succi 32'; Miccoli 75'	Stadium: Stadio Atleti Azzurri d'Italia; Attendance: 10,699; Referee: Nicola Pierpaoli

31 May 2009 38	Internazionale	4–3	Atalanta	Milan
15:00 CEST (UTC+02:00)	Muntari 6'; Ibrahimović 12', 81'; Cambiasso 80'		Doni 10', 53'; Cigarini 25'	Stadium: San Siro; Attendance: 69,405; Referee: Gianluca Rocchi

=== Coppa Italia ===
23 August 2008 Third round	Atalanta	2–1	Modena	Bergamo
15:30 CEST (UTC+02:00)	Manfredini 31'; Marconi 90'		Bruno 40' (pen.)	Stadium: Stadio Atleti Azzurri d'Italia; Attendance: 4,900; Referee: Nicola Ayroldi

1 October 2008 Fourth round	Lazio	2–0	Atalanta	Rome
20:30 CEST (UTC+02:00)	Ledesma 17'; Pandev 84'	Report		Stadium: Stadio Olimpico; Attendance: 10,000; Referee: Matteo Trefoloni

== Statistics ==
=== Appearances and goals ===
Correct as of 17:19, 1 February 2009 (UTC)

No.	Pos	Nat	Player	Total		Serie A		Coppa Italia	
No.	Pos	Nat	Player	Apps	Goals	Apps	Goals	Apps	Goals
1	GK	(Italy) ITA	Andrea Consigli	1	0	1	0	0	0
2	DF	(Italy) ITA	Leonardo Talamonti	22	0	21	0	1	0
5	DF	(Italy) ITA	Thomas Manfredini	21	2	19	1	2	1
6	DF	(Italy) ITA	Gianpaolo Bellini	20	0	19	0	1	0
7	MF	(Italy) ITA	Alessio Manzoni	1	0	1	0	0	0
8	DF	(Austria) AUT	György Garics	24	1	22	1	2	0
9	FW	(Guinea) GUI	Karamoko Cissé	0	0	0	0	0	0
9	FW	(Italy) ITA	Gianvito Plasmati	0	0	0	0	0	0
11	FW	(Italy) ITA	Alessio Cerci	7	0	7	0	0	0
13	FW	(Italy) ITA	Federico Peluso	0	0	0	0	0	0
15	MF	(Italy) ITA	Diego De Ascentis	18	0	16	0	2	0
16	DF	(Italy) ITA	Claudio Rivalta	12	0	11	0	1	0
17	MF	(Italy) ITA	Tiberio Guarente	23	2	21	2	2	0
18	MF	(Italy) ITA	Antonino D'Agostino	1	0	1	0	0	0
20	MF	(Chile) CHI	Jaime Valdés	18	2	16	2	2	0
21	MF	(Italy) ITA	Luca Cigarini	12	0	10	0	2	0
22	MF	(Italy) ITA	Simone Padoin	23	1	21	1	2	0
23	MF	(Portugal) POR	Costinha	0	0	0	0	0	0
26	DF	(Argentina) ARG	Maximiliano Pellegrino	8	0	7	0	1	0
27	DF	(Italy) ITA	Daniele Capelli	8	0	7	0	1	0
28	MF	(Italy) ITA	Giacomo Bonaventura	1	0	1	0	0	0
31	GK	(Italy) ITA	Ferdinando Coppola	23	0	21	0	2	0
32	FW	(Italy) ITA	Christian Vieri	8	2	8	2	0	0
33	FW	(Italy) ITA	Sergio Floccari	24	10	22	10	2	0
34	FW	(Italy) ITA	Marino Defendi	4	0	4	0	0	0
46	MF	(Italy) ITA	Simone Cerea	0	0	0	0	0	0
55	MF	(Italy) ITA	Francesco Parravicini	0	0	0	0	0	0
72	MF	(Italy) ITA	Cristiano Doni	21	5	20	5	1	0
79	MF	(Brazil) BRA	Adriano Ferreira Pinto	23	3	21	3	2	0
89	FW	(Italy) ITA	Michele Marconi	5	1	3	0	2	1
91	GK	(Italy) ITA	Simone Colombi	0	0	0	0	0	0

=== Top scorers ===
Friendlies not included

Position	Nation	Number	Name	Goals
1	(Italy)	33	Sergio Floccari	10
2	(Italy)	72	Cristiano Doni	5
3	(Italy)	79	Adriano Ferreira Pinto	3
4	(Italy)	17	Tiberio Guarente	2
=	(Chile)	20	Jaime Valdés	2
=	(Italy)	32	Christian Vieri	2
5	(Austria)	8	György Garics	1
=	(Italy)	5	Thomas Manfredini	1
=	(Italy)	7	Michele Marconi	1
=	(Italy)	22	Simone Padoin	1
