= Andrea Consigli =

Italian footballer (born 1987)

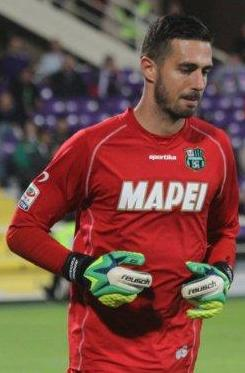
- Consigli with Sassuolo in 2014

Personal information
- Date of birth: 27 January 1987 (age 39)
- Place of birth: Cormano, Italy
- Height: 1.89 m (6 ft 2 in)
- Position: Goalkeeper

Youth career
- 2004–2006: Atalanta

Senior career*
Years	Team	Apps	(Gls)
2006–2014	Atalanta	193	(0)
2006–2007	→ Sambenedettese (loan)	32	(0)
2007–2008	→ Rimini (loan)	35	(0)
2014–2025	Sassuolo	357	(0)
Total		617	(0)

International career
2003	Italy U16	8	(0)
2003–2004	Italy U17	4	(0)
2004–2005	Italy U18	7	(0)
2005–2006	Italy U19	7	(0)
2005–2007	Italy U20	5	(0)
2006–2009	Italy U21	20	(0)
2008	Italy U23	1	(0)
2008	Italy Olympic	1	(0)
- * Club domestic league appearances and goals

Andrea Consigli (born 27 January 1987) is an Italian former professional footballer who played as a goalkeeper.

== Club career ==
Born in Cormano, Consigli is a youth product of Atalanta. To gain some first team experience, the young goalkeeper was loaned out to Serie C1 side Sambenedettese in the 2006–07 season. The following season, he was loaned to Serie B side Rimini. After a successful loan spell there, he returned to Atalanta and acquired the number 1 shirt.

On 1 September 2014, Consigli joined Serie A team Sassuolo for €3 million. After 11 years at Sassuolo, he left the club on 30 June 2025, at the age of 38, following the expiration of his contract.

== International career ==
Consigli made his debut with the Italy U21 squad on 15 August 2006, in a friendly match against Croatia. Then he was selected by head coach Pierluigi Casiraghi in the squad for the 2007 U-21 Championship as the third choice goalkeeper. After that competition he became the first choice in the goal for Italy U-21 team until the 2009 U-21 Championship, in which Italy reached the semi-finals, where they were defeated 1–0 by eventual champions Germany.

In 2008, he took part at the 2008 Summer Olympics in Beijing with the Italian Olympic team, as the back-up of Emiliano Viviano.

He received his first call-up for the Italian senior team by head coach Cesare Prandelli, for the friendly match against England held on 15 August 2012 in Bern.

== Style of play ==
An experienced and reliable keeper, Consigli was considered to be a promising goalkeeper in his youth, and is known for his goalkeeping technique, quick reflexes, shot–stopping, and ability in one–on–one situations. He has also stood out for his penalty–stopping abilities throughout his career; with 20 stops in 510 appearances since 2009, he has parried the third–most penalties in Serie A history, behind only Gianluca Pagliuca and Samir Handanović, with 24 and 26 stops respectively. His role model as a goalkeeper is Gianluigi Buffon. Considered to be one of the best goalkeepers in the Italian top–flight, and one of Sassuolo's best players, in 2012, Padraig Whelan of forzaitalianfootball.com described Consigli as "perhaps the most underrated player in Serie A in any position", and as a goalkeeper with "few weaknesses in his game".

== Career statistics ==
Appearances and goals by club, season and competition
Club	Season	League			Coppa Italia		Europe		Total	
Club	Season	Division	Apps	Goals	Apps	Goals	Apps	Goals	Apps	Goals
Atalanta	2004–05	Serie A	0	0	0	0	—		0	0
Atalanta	2005–06	Serie B	0	0	0	0	—		0	0
Atalanta	2008–09	Serie A	17	0	1	0	—		18	0
Atalanta	2009–10	Serie A	31	0	1	0	—		32	0
Atalanta	2010–11	Serie B	40	0	1	0	—		41	0
Atalanta	2011–12	Serie A	35	0	1	0	—		36	0
Atalanta	2012–13	Serie A	35	0	2	0	—		37	0
Atalanta	2013–14	Serie A	35	0	1	0	—		36	0
Atalanta	2014–15	Serie A	0	0	1	0	—		1	0
Atalanta	Total		193	0	8	0	—		201	0
Sambenedettese (loan)	2006–07	Serie C1	32	0	0	0	—		32	0
Rimini (loan)	2007–08	Serie B	35	0	2	0	—		37	0
Sassuolo	2014–15	Serie A	35	0	0	0	—		35	0
Sassuolo	2015–16	Serie A	37	0	1	0	—		38	0
Sassuolo	2016–17	Serie A	37	0	0	0	9	0	46	0
Sassuolo	2017–18	Serie A	37	0	1	0	—		38	0
Sassuolo	2018–19	Serie A	36	0	1	0	—		37	0
Sassuolo	2019–20	Serie A	31	0	1	0	—		32	0
Sassuolo	2020–21	Serie A	37	0	0	0	—		37	0
Sassuolo	2021–22	Serie A	37	0	0	0	—		37	0
Sassuolo	2022–23	Serie A	35	0	1	0	—		36	0
Sassuolo	2023–24	Serie A	35	0	1	0	—		36	0
Sassuolo	Total		357	0	6	0	9	0	372	0
Career total			617	0	16	0	9	0	642	0

== Honours ==
Atalanta

- Campionato Giovanissimi Nazionali: 2001–02
- Serie B: 2010–11

Italy U21

- UEFA European Under-21 Championship bronze: 2009

Individual

- 2009 UEFA European Under-21 Championship Selection
