= Massimo Taibi =

Italian footballer (born 1970)

Personal information
- Date of birth: 18 February 1970 (age 56)
- Place of birth: Palermo, Italy
- Height: 1.90 m (6 ft 3 in)
- Position: Goalkeeper

Senior career*
Years	Team	Apps	(Gls)
1987–1989	Licata	1	(0)
1989–1990	Trento	23	(0)
1990–1991	Milan	0	(0)
1991–1992	Como	34	(0)
1992–1997	Piacenza	177	(0)
1997–1998	Milan	17	(0)
1998–1999	Venezia	34	(0)
1999–2000	Manchester United	4	(0)
2000–2001	Reggina	52	(1)
2001–2005	Atalanta	131	(0)
2005–2007	Torino	49	(0)
2007–2009	Ascoli	47	(0)
Total		569	(1)
- * Club domestic league appearances and goals

Massimo Taibi (Italian pronunciation: [ˈmassimo taˈibi]; born 18 February 1970) is an Italian former professional footballer who played as a goalkeeper for several clubs, mostly in Italy's Serie A, B, and C1. He had a brief spell at English club Manchester United.

== Career ==
=== Italy ===
Taibi started his career for Licata until 1989. He appeared only once, before moving to Trentino, where he was a first-choice goalkeeper, playing 23 matches. After one season, he moved to Milan in Serie A for the 1990–91 season. As in his first club, he was not used at all, and shortly moved to Como, where he played the following season. After that he moved to Piacenza. Taibi stayed there for five seasons, until the 1996–97 season, and appeared for most of the club's games.

Piacenza thought his time was over, so they sold him to the club which had not played him, Milan. This time, Milan played him in half of the 1997–98 season games as a backup to teammate Sebastiano Rossi. Then Milan sold him to Venezia in 1998. In his first season with Venezia, he played in nearly every game.

=== Manchester United ===
In 1999, following an injury to Manchester United goalkeeper Mark Bosnich, the reigning English and European champions purchased Taibi for £4.5 million on 31 August 1999. He made his debut against Liverpool, where he failed to claim a high ball from a free kick, allowing Sami Hyypiä to score; however, he later made a number of saves, including a one-on-one from Vladimír Šmicer. United went on to win 3–2 with Taibi getting the man of the match award. Taibi shared goalkeeping duties with fellow understudy Raimond van der Gouw, taking responsibility for league matches while Van der Gouw started in the UEFA Champions League, even after Bosnich's recovery; however, a mistake against Southampton on 25 September 1999, when Taibi let a weak shot from Matthew Le Tissier slip through his legs into the goal, led to him being dubbed "The Blind Venetian" by one newspaper. He only played once more for Manchester United, in a 5–0 defeat at Chelsea on 3 October 1999, United's first league defeat since losing to Middlesbrough in December 1998.

=== Return to Italy ===
In January 2000, Taibi joined Reggina on loan until the end of the season, where he played regularly. After the loan spell ended, Manchester United made it clear that – although Taibi was available for transfer – another loan deal was out of the question, rejecting a bid from Napoli. In July 2000, Manchester United agreed to allow Taibi to rejoin Reggina for a fee of £2.5 million. On 1 April 2001, Taibi scored a goal with a header off a corner kick in the 87th minute against Udinese to equalise the score final score to a 1–1 draw at home. With the goal, Taibi was the second goalkeeper to score from open play in Serie A history after Michelangelo Rampulla in 1992.

After the 2000–01 season finished in relegation for Reggina, he was shifted to Atalanta as a replacement of Ivan Pelizzoli. In the summer of 2005, he went on loan to Torino, serving as first-choice goalkeeper; the move became permanent in 2006, with Taibi however becoming the backup goalkeeper behind Christian Abbiati. He made his seasonal debut on 13 January 2007. In the 2007–08 season, he joined Ascoli, as Torino acquired the services of Matteo Sereni. Taibi played 47 matches, before he announced his retirement from football in 2009.

== Style of play ==
A centre-forward in his youth, whose role model was Roberto Boninsegna, Taibi later switched to the position of goalkeeper. He was known in particular for his penalty-saving abilities as a shot-stopper. Taibi played a total of 292 Serie A games between 1993 and 2007; during his career he stopped 12 spot kicks in the Italian top flight, the joint-ninth-most penalties saved in Serie A history, alongside Emiliano Viviano, Luigi Turci and Giuseppe Taglialatela.

== Career statistics ==
Appearances and goals by club, season and competition
Club	Season	League			Cup		Europe		Other		Total	
Club	Season	Division	Apps	Goals	Apps	Goals	Apps	Goals	Apps	Goals	Apps	Goals
Licata	1988–89	Serie B	1	0	0	0	—		—		1	0
Trento	1989–90	Serie C1	23	0	0	0	—		—		23	0
Milan	1990–91	Serie A	0	0	0	0	0	0	0	0	0	0
Como	1991–92	Serie C1	34	0	5	0	—		—		39	0
Piacenza	1992–93	Serie B	38	0	0	0	—		—		38	0
Piacenza	1993–94	Serie A	34	0	1	0	—		—		35	0
Piacenza	1994–95	Serie B	38	0	5	0	—		—		43	0
Piacenza	1995–96	Serie A	33	0	1	0	—		—		34	0
Piacenza	1996–97	Serie A	34	0	1	0	—		1	0	36	0
Piacenza	Total		177	0	8	0	—		1	0	186	0
Milan	1997–98	Serie A	17	0	0	0	—		—		17	0
Venezia	1998–99	Serie A	33	0	2	0	—		—		35	0
Venezia	1999–2000	Serie A	1	0	—		—		—		1	0
Venezia	Total		34	0	2	0	—		—		36	0
Manchester United	1999–2000	Premier League	4	0	0	0	0	0	0	0	4	0
Reggina	1999–2000	Serie A	19	0	—		—		—		19	0
Reggina	2000–01	Serie A	34	1	1	0	—		2	0	37	1
Reggina	Total		53	1	1	0	—		2	0	56	1
Atalanta	2001–02	Serie A	30	0	0	0	—		—		30	0
Atalanta	2002–03	Serie A	33	0	2	0	—		2	0	37	0
Atalanta	2003–04	Serie B	46	0	1	0	—		—		47	0
Atalanta	2004–05	Serie A	22	0	2	0	—		—		24	0
Atalanta	2005–06	Serie B	0	0	0	0	—		—		0	0
Atalanta	Total		131	0	5	0	—		2	0	138	0
Torino	2005–06	Serie B	42	0	0	0	—		4	0	46	0
Torino	2006–07	Serie A	3	0	0	0	—		—		3	0
Torino	Total		45	0	0	0	—		4	0	49	0
Ascoli	2007–08	Serie B	34	0	2	0	—		—		36	0
Ascoli	2008–09	Serie B	13	0	2	0	—		—		15	0
Ascoli	Total		47	0	4	0	—		—		51	0
Career total			569	1	25	0	0	0	9	0	603	1

== Honours ==
Piacenza

- Serie B: 1994–95

Manchester United

- Intercontinental Cup: 1999
