= 2000–01 Reggina Calcio season =

Reggina
2000–01 season
- Chairman: Pasquale Foti
- Manager: Franco Colomba
- Serie A: 15th
- Coppa Italia: 2nd Round
- Top goalscorer: Davide Dionigi (6)

Reggina Calcio were relegated following losing three key players in the summer of 2000. Despite goalkeeper Massimo Taibi being in full form following his Manchester United debacle, Reggina had serious goal scoring problems without departed striker Mohamed Kallon. With Davide Dionigi arriving from Sampdoria mid-season, Reggina solved that problem, and Dionigi's six goals led to a spareggio for the Serie A stay, a double-header Reggina lost. Coach Franco Colomba was not blamed for the relegation, and was given the all-clear to stay for a further season, with Reggina one of the favourites to bounce back to the top domestic division.

== Squad ==
=== Goalkeepers ===
- (Italy) Massimo Taibi
- (Italy) Emanuele Belardi
- (Italy) Antonio Castelli

=== Defenders ===
- (Czech Republic) Martin Jiránek
- (Italy) Luca Mezzano
- (Portugal) Marco Caneira
- (Italy) Giovanni Morabito
- (Italy) Joseph Dayo Oshadogan
- (Italy) Lorenzo Stovini

=== Midfielders ===
- (Italy) Andrea Zanchetta
- (Portugal) José Mamede
- (Italy) Francesco Cozza
- (Chile) Jorge Vargas
- (Portugal) Paulo Costa
- (Italy) Salvatore Vicari
- (Italy) Ezio Brevi
- (Italy) Andrea Bernini
- (Argentina) Ricardo Verón
- (Brazil) Mozart

=== Attackers ===
- (Albania) Erjon Bogdani
- (Italy) Davide Dionigi
- (Italy) Davide Possanzini
- (Italy) Maurizio Nassi
- (Italy) Massimo Marazzina

== Serie A ==
Pos	Team	Pld	W	D	L	GF	GA	GD	Pts	Qualification or relegation
13	Lecce	34	8	13	13	40	54	−14	37 (Note: Lecce finished ahead of Reggina and Hellas Verona on head-to-head points: Lecce: 10 pts, Reggina: 4 pts, Hellas Verona: 2 pts.)	
14	Hellas Verona (Note: Hellas Verona winner of 2000–01 Relegation tie-breaker against Reggina.)	34	10	7	17	40	59	−19	37	Relegation tie-breaker
15	Reggina (R)	34	10	7	17	32	49	−17	37	Serie B after tie-breaker
16	Vicenza (R)	34	9	9	16	37	51	−14	36 (Note: Vicenza finished ahead of Napoli on head-to-head points: Vicenza 2–0 Napoli, Napoli 1–2 Vicenza.)	Relegation to Serie B
17	Napoli (R)	34	8	12	14	35	51	−16	36	Relegation to Serie B

Source: 2000–01 Serie A, Soccerway, RSSSF.com
Rules for classification: 1) Points; 2) Head-to-head points; 3) Head-to-head goal difference; 4) Goal difference; 5) Goals scored; 6) Draw. (Note: Head-to-head record is used only after all the matches between the teams in question have been played).
(R) Relegated

=== Matches ===
1	Reggina	2–1	Inter
	Possanzini 45'; Marazzina 50'		Recoba 10'

2	Fiorentina	2–1	Reggina
	Gomes 86'; Leandro 89'		Marazzina 69'

3	Reggina	0–1	Lecce
			Lucarelli 35' (pen.)

4	Bologna	2–0	Reggina
	Oliveira 58'; Binotto 80'

5	Reggina	0–2	Juventus
			Trezeguet 45', 64'

6	Roma	2–1	Reggina
	Totti 29' (pen.); Montella 70'		Bogdani 60'

7	Udinese	3–0	Reggina
	Sosa 36', 52'; Fiore 44' (pen.)

8	Reggina	0–3	Brescia
			Marino 55'; Calori 70'; Esposito 81'

9	Lazio	2–0	Reggina
	Salas 26'; Crespo 57'

10	Reggina	1–1	Verona
	Stovini 90'		Bonazzoli 1'

11	Napoli	6–2	Reggina
	Baccin 5'; Magoni 20'; Amoruso 34' (pen.); Bellucci 56'; Troise 73'; Jankulovski 84'		Cozza 67' (pen.); Mozart 87'

12	Reggina	1–0	Vicenza
	Brevi 72'

13	Parma	0–2	Reggina
			Dionigi 20', 54'

14	Reggina	1–0	Atalanta
	Dionigi 32'

15	Bari	2–1	Reggina
	Innocenti 37'; Andersson 80' (pen.)		Cozza 27'

16	Reggina	0–2	Perugia
			Materazzi 20' (pen.); Liverani 38'

17	Milan	1–0	Reggina
	Leonardo 79'

18	Inter	1–1	Reggina
	Vieri 40' (pen.)		Dionigi 22'

19	Reggina	1–1	Fiorentina
	Zanchetta 40'		Chiesa 11'

20	Lecce	2–1	Reggina
	Balleri 14'; Lucarelli 72'		Cozza 28'

21	Reggina	2–1	Bologna
	Zanchetta 7'; Cozza 42'		Signori 68'

22	Juventus	1–0	Reggina
	Tudor 31'

23	Reggina	0–0	Roma

24	Reggina	1–1	Udinese
	Taibi 88'		Alberto 68'

25	Brescia	4–0	Reggina
	Filippini 33'; Petruzzi 48'; Baggio 73' (pen.); Tare 90'

26	Reggina	0–2	Lazio
			Crespo 16', 70'

27	Verona	0–3	Reggina
			Dionigi 19'; Cozza 42'; Mamede 90'

28	Reggina	3–1	Napoli
	Dionigi 5'; Marazzina 41'; Zanchetta 49'		Edmundo 59'

29	Vicenza	2–1	Reggina
	Zanchi 64', 86'		Marazzina 52'

30	Reggina	2–0	Parma
	Bernini 38', 76'

31	Atalanta	1–1	Reggina
	Zauri 11'		Zanchetta 15'

32	Reggina	1–0	Bari
	Vargas 50'

33	Perugia	1–1	Reggina
	Materazzi 62' (pen.)		Zanchetta 31'

34	Reggina	2–1	Milan
	Morabito 77'; Costa 82'		Kaladze 69'

=== Relegation tie-breaker ===
Hellas Verona	1–0	Reggina	Verona
Laursen 6'

Reggina	2–1 (2–2a agg.)	Hellas Verona
Zanchetta 42'; Cozza 45'		Cossato 86'

=== Topscorers ===
- (Italy) Davide Dionigi 6
- (Italy) Andrea Zanchetta 5
- (Italy) Francesco Cozza 5
- (Italy) Massimo Marazzina 4

== Sources ==
- RSSSF - Italy 2000/01
