= Donadoni =

Donadoni is a surname of Italian origin. Notable people with the name include:

- Marco Donadoni (born 1951), Italian game designer
- Mario Donadoni (born 1979), Italian football defender
- Maurizio Donadoni (born 1958), Italian actor
- Roberto Donadoni (born 1963), Italian football midfielder and manager
- Sergio Donadoni (1914–2015), Italian Egyptologist
