= Valerio Foglio =

Italian football defender

Personal information
- Date of birth: 9 February 1985 (age 41)
- Place of birth: Legnano, Italy
- Height: 1.80 m (5 ft 11 in)
- Positions: Left back; left midfielder

Youth career
- 2001–2004: Atalanta

Senior career*
| Years | Team | Apps | (Gls) |
| 2004–2009 | Vicenza | 25 | (0) |
| 2006 | → Pisa (loan) | 4 | (0) |
| 2006–2007 | → Pavia (loan) | 25 | (2) |
| 2007–2008 | → Legnano (loan) | 29 | (6) |
| 2009–2012 | AlbinoLeffe | 92 | (8) |
| 2012–2013 | Grosseto | 24 | (1) |
| 2013–2014 | Reggina | 23 | (1) |
| 2014–2015 | Monza | 18 | (3) |
| 2015 | Novara | 14 | (1) |
| 2015–2016 | Mantova | 13 | (0) |
| 2016 | Pavia | 13 | (1) |
| 2016–2017 | Carrarese | 35 | (0) |
| 2017–2018 | Giana Erminio | 33 | (0) |
| 2018–2020 | Legnano | | |
| 2020–2021 | GS Arconatese | 30 | (2) |
| 2021–2023 | GS Castanese | | |
| 2023–2024 | FC Rhodense | | |
- * Club domestic league appearances and goals as of 14 October 2026

Valerio Foglio (born 9 February 1985) is an Italian footballer who plays as a left back.

== Career ==
=== Vicenza ===
Foglio was signed by Serie B club Vicenza in a co-ownership deal for €500,000 in June 2004, as part of Claudio Rivalta's deal for €1.7 million. In June 2006 Vicenza acquired Foglio outright for free.

=== AlbinoLeffe ===
In July 2009, he left for AlbinoLeffe in co-ownership deal for €190,000 in a 4-year contract. In June 2010 AlbinoLeffe signed Foglio outright for another €160,000.

In 2010–11 season he changed his shirt number to no.11, and gave the no.5 to Dario Passoni.

=== Grosseto ===
In 2012, he was signed by Grosseto.

=== Reggina ===
On 3 September 2013 he was sold to Serie B club Reggina.

=== Monza ===
On 18 June 2014 he was signed by Monza.

=== Novara ===
On 13 January 2015, he was signed by Novara Calcio.

=== Montova ===
On 31 August 2015 Foglio was signed by Mantova in a 3-year deal.
