= Lorenzo Sibilano =

Italian footballer

Personal information
- Date of birth: 10 July 1978 (age 48)
- Place of birth: Bari, Italy
- Height: 1.89 m (6 ft 2 in)
- Position: Defender

Youth career
- Bari

Senior career*
Years	Team	Apps	(Gls)
1997–2006	Bari	89	(3)
1998–1999	→Crotone (loan)	31	(1)
2003–2004	→Viterbese (loan)	32	(2)
2006–2009	Verona	62	(3)
2009–2011	Andria BAT	56	(5)

Managerial career
- 2011–2012: Taranto (assistant)
- 2012–2013: Reggina (assistant)
- 2014: Cremonese (assistant)
- 2015: Varese (assistant)
- 2015: Matera (assistant)
- 2020-2021: Brescia (assistant)
- 2022: Cosenza (assistant)
- 2025-: Reggiana (assistant)
- * Club domestic league appearances and goals

Lorenzo Sibilano (born 10 July 1978) is an Italian former footballer who played as a defender.

On 2 July 2011 his contract with Andria was mutually terminated.
