= Natale Gonnella =

Italian footballer

Personal information
- Date of birth: 19 January 1976 (age 50)
- Place of birth: Colleferro, Italy
- Height: 1.80 m (5 ft 11 in)
- Position: Central defender

Team information
- Current team: Casale

Youth career
- ?–1995: Internazionale

Senior career*
Years	Team	Apps	(Gls)
1995–1996	Gualdo	12	(0)
1996–1997	Ravenna	25	(1)
1997–2003	Verona	113	(3)
2003–2005	Atalanta	51	(2)
2005	→ Arezzo (loan)	18	(0)
2005–2007	Pescara	59	(3)
2007–2009	Grosseto	3	(0)
2008	→ Verona (loan)	12	(1)
2009–2010	Como	22	(2)
2010–2013	Casale	23	(1)

International career
1991–1992	Italy U16	14	(0)
1993–1994	Italy U18	6	(0)
- * Club domestic league appearances and goals

Natale Gonnella (born 19 January 1976) is an Italian retired footballer who played as a defender.

Gonnella played more than 250 matches at Serie B.

== Club career ==
Born in Colleferro, in the province of Rome, Gonnella started his career at northern giant Internazionale. In 1995, he left for Serie C1 side Gualdo then Ravenna of Serie B.

In 1997, he joined Hellas Verona where he played until 2003. In January 2003 he joined Atalanta of Serie A, in exchange with Mauro Minelli. After the team relegated in June 2003, partnered with Gianpaolo Bellini he played as a regular starter in Serie B and won promotion back to Serie A. Since the return of Cesare Natali, he just played 9 league matches before left on loan to Arezzo in January 2005. Since 2005–06 season he left on loan at Pescara of Serie B and turned permanent in January 2007. After Pescara relegated, in July 2007 he left for Grosseto of Serie B.

In January 2008, he returned to Hellas Varona on loan to play at Serie C1. In March 2009, he canceled his contract with Grosseto.

In November 2009, he signed a contract until end of season for Como. In the next season he was signed by Casale.

== International career ==
Gonnella capped for Italy at 1992 UEFA European Under-16 Championship qualification and final phase. He also played for the Italy Under-18 side during their 1994 UEFA European Under-18 Football Championship qualification campaign, and was a member of the side that lost to Russia U-18 in the qualification playoffs.
