= Ferreira Pinto (footballer, born 1979) =

Brazilian footballer

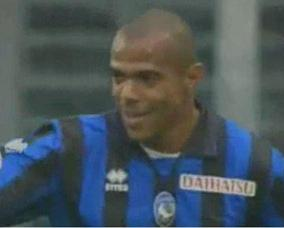

Personal information
- Full name: Adriano Ferreira Pinto
- Date of birth: 10 December 1979 (age 46)
- Place of birth: Quinta do Sol, Brazil
- Height: 1.78 m (5 ft 10 in)
- Position: Right winger

Team information
- Current team: Ponte San Pietro

Youth career
- 1997–1998: Galícia

Senior career*
Years	Team	Apps	(Gls)
1999–2001	União São João	35	(28)
2001–2004	Lanciano	71	(15)
2004–2005	Perugia	38	(8)
2005–2006	Cesena	39	(11)
2006–2013	Atalanta	146	(14)
2013	Varese	18	(0)
2013–2014	Lecce	23	(2)
2014–	Ponte San Pietro	292	(78)
- * Club domestic league appearances and goals as of 4 October 2023

Adriano Ferreira Pinto (born 10 December 1979), or simply Ferreira Pinto, is a Brazilian football winger playing for Italian Serie D club Ponte San Pietro.

He played for São José Esporte Clube in Brazil before joining S.S. Lanciano in 2002 in Italy's Serie C1. He then moved up to Serie B with Perugia and Cesena.

In October 2008, Ferreira Pinto extended his contract with Atalanta to June 2011. During the last days of winter's market he signed a contract until June with the Serie B team Varese.

== Personal life ==
Ferreira Pinto was born in Quinta do Sol, Paranà. He grew up in a very poor family and at the age of 15 he lost his father. Until the age of 18 he worked as bricklayer and day laborer.

In Italy, he met Marianna, whom he married on 7 June 2009 in Lanciano, Abruzzo. They have a son, José Carlos.

== Career ==
Ferreira Pinto began his career at União São João in the Campeonato Brasileiro Série C. During his first season he managed 28 goals.

In 2001, he was close to joining Standard Liège, but last moment he changed his mind and signed for Lanciano in Serie C1. He played for the Frentani until August 2004, scoring 15 goals in 71 matches.

On July 1 2004, he signed for Perugia, in italian Serie B. He made his debut in the 2–1 win against Crotone on 11 September 2004. On 21 September, Ferreira Pinto scored his first goal for Perugia in a 2–0 victory against Treviso.

At the end of the season Perugia failed and Ferreira Pinto signed for Cesena. He finished 2005–06 season scoring 11 goals in 39 matches.

== Honours ==
=== Atalanta ===
- Serie B (1): 2010–2011
