= Alex Calderoni =

Italian footballer (born 1976)

Personal information
- Date of birth: 31 May 1976 (age 50)
- Place of birth: Ravenna, Italy
- Height: 1.82 m (6 ft 0 in)
- Position: Goalkeeper

Team information
- Current team: Cesena U20 (goalkeeping coach)

Youth career
- Cesena

Senior career*
Years	Team	Apps	(Gls)
1995–1998	Cesena	1	(0)
1996–1997	→ Forlì (loan)	31	(0)
1998–2000	Alzano	72	(0)
2000–2007	Atalanta	95	(0)
2000–2001	→ Ravenna (loan)	11	(0)
2001	→ Monza (loan)	14	(0)
2007–2008	Treviso	37	(0)
2008–2010	Torino	10	(0)
2010	Triestina	19	(0)
2010–2011	Atletico Roma	5	(0)
2011	→ Cesena (loan)	1	(0)
2011–2012	Cesena	0	(0)
2013	Padova	0	(0)
2013–2014	Juve Stabia	14	(0)
2014–2015	Carrarese	39	(0)
2015–2016	Ribelle	30	(0)
2016–2017	ASD Meldola		
2017–2018	Polisportiva Aurora S.Giorgio		
2018–2019	Cava Ronco		
2019–2020	Castrocaro Calcio		
2020–2021	Polisportiva 2000 Calcio		
2021–2022	Cervia		
Total		379	(0)
- * Club domestic league appearances and goals

Alex Calderoni (born 31 May 1976) is an Italian former professional footballer who is currently as a goalkeeping coach for Cesena U20.

== Career ==
Calderoni joined Alzano in a co-ownership deal in 1998. In 2000, Calderoni was acquired by Atalanta from Cesena. He was immediately loaned to Serie B club Ravenna in a temporary deal.

On 31 August 2007, Calderoni joined Treviso for a €200,000 transfer fee. (with additional €30,000 other cost occurred for Treviso)

In 2008, Calderoni joined Torino F.C.

In January 2011, Calderoni was re-signed by A.C. Cesena in a temporary deal.
