= Andrea Lazzari (footballer) =

Italian footballer (born 1984)

Personal information
- Date of birth: 3 December 1984 (age 41)
- Place of birth: Bergamo, Italy
- Height: 1.84 m (6 ft 0 in)
- Position: Midfielder

Youth career
- Atalanta

Senior career*
Years	Team	Apps	(Gls)
2002–2008	Atalanta	68	(5)
2006–2007	→ Cesena (loan)	14	(1)
2007	→ Piacenza (loan)	13	(3)
2007–2008	→ Grosseto (loan)	40	(9)
2008–2011	Cagliari	99	(9)
2011–2015	Fiorentina	36	(2)
2012–2014	→ Udinese (loan)	49	(1)
2015–2016	Carpi	8	(1)
2016	Bari	9	(1)
2016–2017	Pisa	19	(0)
2017–2019	Fano	51	(1)
2019–2023	FC Vigor Senigallia		

International career
2004–2007	Italy U21	9	(2)
- * Club domestic league appearances and goals

Andrea Lazzari (Italian pronunciation: [anˈdrɛːa ˈladdzari]; born 3 December 1984) is an Italian former professional footballer who plays as a midfielder.

== Club career ==
=== Atalanta ===
Born in Milan, Lazzari started his professional career at hometown club Atalanta. During 2003–04 Serie B season, he was promoted from Primavera under–20 team to the first team. He made his Serie B debut on 4 October 2003, substituted Riccardo Montolivo in the 86th minute. He followed the team promoted back to Serie A as the 5th and made his Serie A on 22 September 2004, replaced Nicola Mingazzini in the 81st minute. Lazzari scored a hat-trick against Juventus in Coppa Italia, a match in which Juventus was eliminated in a 5–3 aggregate, while Lazzari also scored the 2 goals in the first leg. Lazzari followed Atalanta relegated back to Serie B in June 2005. He won Serie B champion with the team in June 2006.

In August 2006, he was loaned back to Serie B for Cesena, as part of the deal that Atalanta signed Adriano Ferreira Pinto. On 31 January 2007 he was sub-loan to Piacenza Calcio, as part of the deal that Cesena signed Alessandro Pellicori. In July 2007, he was loaned to Serie B newcomer Grosseto, where he finally became a regular starter and scored 9 goals.

=== Cagliari ===
On 9 July 2008, he was sold to fellow Serie A side Cagliari in co-ownership deal, in a four-year contract, for €1.8 million fee. He took no.10 shirt from departed winger Pasquale Foggia but started occasionally. He became a regular starter in 2009–10 season, after Andrea Cossu became the first choice attacking midfielder, with Lazzari acting as left midfielder. He scored 6 goals that season. On 3 June 2010, Cagliari decided to sign him outright for another €2 million.

=== Fiorentina ===
In July 2011 Lazzari was signed by ACF Fiorentina in another co-ownership deal, for €3 million, in a 4-year contract. In June 2012 La Viola acquired Lazzari outright for another €1.638 million.

=== Udinese (loan) ===
On 30 August 2012, Lazzari moved to Udinese on loan.

With his new team, on 2 September 2012, he scored in a 4–1 defeat against Juventus at Stadio Friuli. The loan was renewed for 2013–14 Serie A season.

In the Europa League qualifying round match against Bosnian club Široki Brijeg in August 2013, Lazzari scored from the halfway line as Udinese won 4–0.

=== Return to Fiorentina ===
Lazzari played three times for La Viola in 2014–15 Serie A.

=== Carpi ===
In summer 2015 Lazzari was signed by Carpi F.C. 1909 in a one-year contract as a free agent.

=== Bari ===
On 1 February 2016, Lazzari was signed by Bari, with Filippo Porcari moved to opposite direction.

=== Later career ===
On 17 December 2019, it was confirmed, that Lazzari had joined Eccellenza club FC Vigor Senigallia.

== International career ==
Lazzari was an unused member of Italy U21 team at 2007 UEFA European Under-21 Football Championship.
