= Biagio Pagano =

Italian footballer (born 1983)

Personal information
- Date of birth: 29 January 1983 (age 43)
- Place of birth: Naples, Italy
- Height: 1.80 m (5 ft 11 in)
- Position: Midfielder

Team information
- Current team: Ghivizzano Borgoamozzano

Youth career
- –2002: Atalanta

Senior career*
Years	Team	Apps	(Gls)
2001–2004	Atalanta	6	(0)
2002–2003	→ Lumezzane (loan)	25	(1)
2004–2006	Sampdoria	8	(1)
2005	→ Atalanta (loan)	6	(0)
2005–2006	→ Bari (loan)	36	(8)
2006–2009	Rimini	105	(13)
2009–2010	Reggina	36	(11)
2010–2011	Livorno	20	(3)
2011–2012	Torino	17	(1)
2012	→ Nocerina (loan)	5	(0)
2012–2013	Modena	25	(2)
2013–2014	Ponsacco		
2014	Grosseto	10	(1)
2014–2015	Catanzaro	15	(3)
2015	Lucchese	13	(0)
2015–2016	Ghivizzano	19	(8)
2016	Viareggio 2014	11	(4)
2016–2017	Massese	14	(1)
2017–	Ghivizzano Borgoamozzano	0	(0)

International career
2000	Italy U17	5	(0)
2000–2001	Italy U18	5	(3)
2002–2004	Italy U20	17	(3)
2004–2005	Italy U21	8	(1)
- * Club domestic league appearances and goals

Biagio Pagano (born 29 January 1983) is an Italian footballer who currently plays as a midfielder for Ghivizzano Borgoamozzano.

Pagano had made 250 appearances in Italian Serie B, including 2 in the playoffs in 2008–09 Serie B.

== Career ==
=== Atalanta ===
Pagano started his career at Atalanta. He made his Serie A debut on 17 June 2001 against Juventus FC He played a few more Serie A games for Atalanta in October 2003, after he was returned from loan to Lumezzane of the third division in 2002–03 Serie C1.

=== Sampdoria ===
In January 2004, he was signed by fellow Serie A club U.C. Sampdoria on loan with option to co-own the player, which the club did in June 2004, for €500,000. He scored his first Serie A goal against A.S. Roma, which gave the team a 1–0 lead, but the game ended in 1–1 draw after Francesco Totti scored a penalty 3 minutes later, in 2004–05 Serie A. He was loaned back to Atalanta in January 2005. Atalanta were relegated at the end of the season, so Pagano went on loan to Bari instead of staying with the Nerazzurri.

=== Rimini ===
In June 2006, Sampdoria bought Atalanta's rights in a blind auction between the two clubs, for €205,000. But he was sold to Rimini in a co-ownership deal in July 2006 for €400,000. With Rimini, Pagano played regularly and finished 5th and 7th with the team in his first 2 seasons; his performance also made the club bought him outright in the end of the first season in June 2007 for €220,000. But in the third season, Rimini failed to win the relegation playoffs against A.C. Ancona, and subsequently got relegated back to Lega Pro 1st Div. (ex–Serie C1) after being promoted 4 years ago. Pagano took part in the playoffs.

=== Reggina ===
In July 2009, he was signed by Reggina of Serie B, who had recently been relegated from Serie A, in a co-ownership deal. In June 2010, Reggina acquired the remain 50% registration rights from Rimini .

=== Livorno ===
In July 2010 Pagano was signed by A.S. Livorno Calcio.

=== Torino ===
In January 2011 Pagano was swapped with Luca Belingheri of Torino F.C.; both players were tagged for €300,000. Pagano signed a 2 1/2-year contract.

=== Modena ===
In August 2012 Pagano was signed by Serie B club Modena F.C. for free.

=== Lega Pro clubs ===
In 2014, he was signed by third-level club U.S. Grosseto F.C. He spent the first half of the season in Eccellenza Tuscany club Ponsacco. On 5 July 2014 Pagano was signed by Catanzaro. On 22 January 2015 he joined Lucchese.

=== International ===
Pagano took part in 2000 UEFA European Under-16 Football Championship qualifying. (now renamed to under-17 with same age limit) He was also capped for Italy U17 (equivalent to current U18), U20 and Italy U21 team.
