= Stefan Schwoch =

Italian footballer

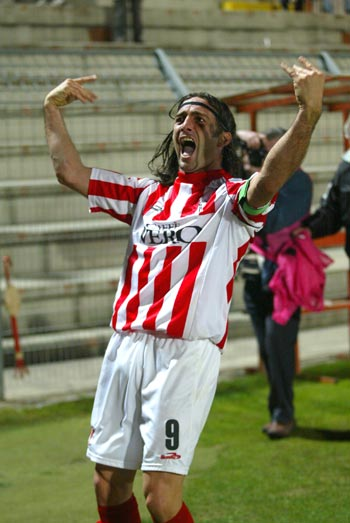
- Schwoch in 2003

Personal information
- Date of birth: 19 October 1969 (age 57)
- Place of birth: Bolzano, Italy
- Height: 1.74 m (5 ft 9 in)
- Position: Striker

Youth career
- 1985–1987: Meran

Senior career*
Years	Team	Apps	(Gls)
1987–1988	Meran	25	(4)
1988–1989	Benacense Riva	31	(9)
1989–1990	Spal	24	(1)
1990–1992	Crevalcore	59	(30)
1992–1994	Pavia	60	(19)
1994–1995	Livorno	33	(20)
1995–1997	Ravenna	71	(30)
1997–1999	Venezia	74	(19)
1999–2000	Napoli	57	(28)
2000–2001	Torino	31	(8)
2001–2008	Vicenza	220	(74)
Total		685	(242)
- * Club domestic league appearances and goals

Stefan Schwoch (born 19 October 1969) is an Italian former professional footballer who played as a striker. He works as sporting director of Vicenza.

== Early life and family ==
Stefan Schwoch was born in Bolzano, South Tyrol (a predominantly German-speaking province in the north east of the country). His surname is Polish German and inherited from his ethnic German grandfather who emigrated to Italy from Poland during World War II. His mother is Sicilian, born in Palermo.

== Playing career ==
Schwoch began his career with Meran in the inter-league in 1987. He scored four goals in 25 matches. The following year he signed with Benacense Riva, where he hit nine goals in 31 appearances. He turned professional in 1989 with Serie C2 side Spal 1907. Playing on the wing he scored one goal in 24 games.

Returning to the amateur scene with Crevalcore in 1990, he became top scorer for two consecutive seasons on the team, scoring 12 goals (in 29 games) in the first season, and 18 goals (in 30 games) in the second. This earned him a move back to Serie C2, with Pavia. He scored seven goals (in 29 games) in his first season with the club and 12 goals (in 21 games) the following year. In 1994–95 he was signed to Livorno, again in Serie C2, where he scored 19 goals in 33 matches, leading the team to the playoffs, before the promotion race ended with defeat in Castel di Sangro.

Sold to Ravenna Calcio of Serie C1, he hit 21 goals in 33 games, leading the club to promotion. The following year, in 1996, the Ravenna finished eighth, thanks to the playmaker Lamberto Zauli and Schwoch's eight goals in 38 matches. He then moved on to Venezia, where his 17 goals (in 36 games) helped the team to break into Serie A.

At the age of 30 he made his debut in the top tier. After two goals in 14 games, he returned to Serie B with Napoli in January 1999, where he scored six goals in 22 matches. In the 1999–2000 season, Schwoch hit 22 goals in 35 games, a club record, as the team won promotion to the top-flight. In 2000, Schwoch, signed with Serie B side Torino, scoring eight goals in 31 matches. The following season he hit 13 goals in 31 matches. In 2002–03, he hit 19 goals in 33 games. The next season, he hit seven goals in 24 appearances. In 2004–05, his rediscovered his scoring form, hitting 12 goals (in 35 games), but the team suffered relegation to Serie C1.

Aged 36 he continued to play, but the first part of the 2005–06 season appeared to be his swan song. Suffering with injuries, he made disappointingly few appearances. Yet he recovered by the season's end to once again produce some fine performances.

His form continued in the 2006–07 season, as he became the club's fourth all-time scorer, surpassing the legendary Paolo Rossi.

In 2007–08, his age finally caught up with him, and on 1 June 2008, Schwoch played his last game.

== Post-retirement ==
On 4 August 2010, he was appointed sporting director of Vicenza.
