= Antonino Bernardini =

Italian footballer and manager (born 1974)

Personal information
- Date of birth: 21 June 1974 (age 52)
- Place of birth: Rome, Italy
- Height: 1.75 m (5 ft 9 in)
- Position: Midfielder

Youth career
- 1992–1994: Roma

Senior career*
| Years | Team | Apps | (Gls) |
| 1994–1996 | Torino | 34 | (3) |
| 1996–1997 | Roma | 16 | (0) |
| 1997–1998 | Perugia | 36 | (12) |
| 1998–1999 | Salernitana | 20 | (1) |
| 1999–2003 | Vicenza | 98 | (6) |
| 2003–2007 | Atalanta | 124 | (3) |
| 2008–2010 | Vicenza | 36 | (5) |
| 2010 | AlbinoLeffe | 10 | (0) |

International career
| 1995 | Italy U21 | 2 | (0) |
| 1996 | Italy Olympic | 1 | (0) |
- * Club domestic league appearances and goals

Antonino Bernardini (born 21 June 1974) is an Italian football manager and former footballer who played as a midfielder.

== Club career ==
Bernardini started his career at Roma. He played his first Serie A game on 19 February 1995 against Calcio Padova. In summer 1996, he returned to Roma and transferred to Perugia in Serie B the next season. He won promotion with the team which finished 4th. He played twice for Perugia at Serie A before joining the league rival Salernitana in October 1998. In summer 1999, he was signed by Vicenza of Serie B and won promotion again as champion. But in the following season, he followed the team relegated back to Serie B. In July 2003, he was signed by league rival Atalanta, which had been newly relegated along with teammate Michele Marcolini. In exchange, Vicenza hired Julien Rantier and Simone Padoin. He won promotion again in 5th place due to the expansion of Serie A. After just playing 6 times in the 2007–08 season, he rejoined Vicenza in January 2008.

In January 2010, he signed a contract until the end of the season with AlbinoLeffe after terminating his contract with Vicenza in mutual consent.

== International career ==
Bernardini was a member of the Italy national under-21 football team that won the 1996 UEFA European Under-21 Championship; he also took part at the Summer Olympics later that year.

== Honours ==
Vicenza

- Serie B: 1999–2000.

Italy U21

- UEFA European Under-21 Championship: 1996.
