= Mario Donadoni =

Italian footballer (born 1979)

Personal information
- Date of birth: 19 November 1979 (age 46)
- Place of birth: Bergamo, Italy
- Height: 1.80 m (5 ft 11 in)
- Position: Defender

Youth career
- 1992–1998: Atalanta

Senior career*
Years	Team	Apps	(Gls)
2003–2006	Alzano Seriate	2	(0)
2006–2007	U.S. Tempio	30	(0)
2007–2009	Rimini	29	(0)
2009–2010	Matera	18	(2)
2010–2012	A.C. Palazzolo	18	(1)
2003–2006	Cremonese	73	(0)
2006–2007	AlbinoLeffe	27	(0)
2007–2009	Padova	10	(0)
2009–2010	Siracusa	3	(0)
2010–2012	FCM Târgu Mureș	2	(0)
Total		212	(3)
- * Club domestic league appearances and goals as of 11 September 2010

Mario Donadoni (born 19 November 1979) is an Italian retired footballer who played as a defender.

== Career ==
In 2009, he was transferred by the Italian Lega Pro Prima Divisione team U.S. Siracusa for which he played 9 games until 2010. In July 2010, Mario Donadoni was transferred by the Romanian Liga I team FCM Târgu Mureş as a free agent.
