= Carmine Gautieri =

Italian footballer and coach (born 1970)

Personal information
- Date of birth: 20 July 1970 (age 56)
- Place of birth: Naples, Italy
- Height: 1.82 m (6 ft 0 in)
- Position: Midfielder

Senior career*
Years	Team	Apps	(Gls)
1987	Campania	3	(0)
1988–1989	Empoli	0	(0)
1989–1991	Turris	59	(5)
1991–1992	Empoli	32	(10)
1992–1993	Cesena	34	(3)
1993–1996	Bari	96	(4)
1996–1997	Perugia	31	(4)
1997–1999	Roma	43	(8)
1999–2002	Piacenza	91	(13)
2002–2004	Atalanta	83	(17)
2005	Napoli	5	(1)
2005	Piacenza	9	(0)
2005–2007	Pescara	49	(2)
2007–2008	Sorrento	16	(1)
Total		551	(68)

Managerial career
- 2008: Potenza
- 2009–2010: Olbia
- 2011–2013: Virtus Lanciano
- 2013: Bari
- 2013–2014: Varese
- 2014–2015: Livorno
- 2016: Latina
- 2017: Ternana
- 2017: Pisa
- 2019–2020: Triestina
- 2022: Avellino
- 2023: Sangiuliano City
- 2024: Taranto
- * Club domestic league appearances and goals

Carmine Gautieri (born 20 July 1970) is an Italian professional football coach and a former player.

== Playing career ==
Gautieri amassed a total of 227 games with 26 goals in Serie A, the top level of Italian football. An offensive midfielder, he also played for Roma in the late 1990s under the tenure of manager Zdeněk Zeman.

== Coaching career ==
Gautieri started his coaching career in the minor leagues with Potenza and Olbia. His breakthrough came with third division minnows Virtus Lanciano, which he joined in 2011–12 and immediately led to success in the Lega Pro Prima Divisione promotion playoffs. After being confirmed as Virtus Lanciano's head coach for the club's historical first Serie B appearance, he managed his side to league safety despite being widely predicted as one of the likeliest sides for relegation.

Gautieri left Virtus Lanciano at the end of the 2012–13 season and was appointed new Bari head coach after that. This role was however quite short-lived, as he tended his resignation on 3 August 2013, citing personal reasons. In November 2013 he was appointed new head coach of another Serie B club, Varese, in place of Stefano Sottili only to be dismissed himself later in March 2014 due to poor results.

In July 2014, he was named the new head coach of newly-relegated Serie B club Livorno. He was removed from his managerial duties on 3 January 2015 and replacing with youth coach Ezio Gelain, with Livorno in sixth place.

He then served as head coach of Serie B club Latina from March to June 2016, succeeding in keeping the Lazio-based club in the second division. On 22 January 2017, Gautieri went back into management as new head coach of another relegation-battling Serie B club, Ternana. After Gautieri lost 6 matches in a row out of 7, he was fired only one and a half months later.

On 14 October 2019, he joined Serie C club Triestina. He was sacked on 2 December 2020 due to a negative start in the 2020–21 Serie C season.

On 17 February 2022, he signed for Avellino on a deal until the end of the season. After not being confirmed as head coach of Avellino, on 23 January 2023 he was appointed at the helm of Serie C club Sangiuliano City. He was however dismissed just three months later, on 23 April 2023, after failing to keep the team out of the relegation playoff zone.

On 17 August 2024, Gautieri was appointed new head coach of Serie C club Taranto. Hired after Ezio Capuano's disengagement from the club due to financial cutbacks within the club and talks about an impending takeover, he was eventually dismissed himself on 13 November 2024, after having missed attending the last two games.
