= Nicola Mingazzini =

Italian footballer

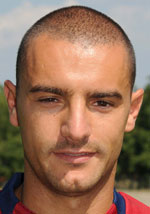

Personal information
- Full name: Nicola Mingazzini
- Date of birth: 13 August 1980 (age 46)
- Place of birth: Faenza, Italy
- Height: 1.70 m (5 ft 7 in)
- Position: Midfielder

Team information
- Current team: Lucchese
- Number: 8

Youth career
- 1997–1998: Ravenna

Senior career*
Years	Team	Apps	(Gls)
1998–1999	Ravenna	2	(0)
1999–2003	Spezia	98	(1)
2003–2006	Atalanta	75	(0)
2006	→ Bologna (loan)	16	(2)
2006–2010	Bologna	117	(4)
2010–2011	AlbinoLeffe	15	(1)
2011–2012	Nocerina	15	(0)
2012–2014	Pisa	51	(0)
2014–	Lucchese	90	(2)
- * Club domestic league appearances and goals as of 3 November 2017

Nicola Mingazzini (born 13 August 1980) is an Italian former footballer who last played as a midfielder for Lucchese.

== Football career ==
Mingazzini started his career at Ravenna of Serie B. He then left for Spezia of Serie C2, and followed the team promoted to Serie C1 in summer 2000.

He then signed by Atalanta of Serie B in summer 2003. He followed the team promoted to Serie A in summer 2004. He made his Serie A debut against Juventus FC on 19 September 2004. After played first half of 2005/2006 Serie B season for Atalanta, Mingazzini left for Bologna. On 12 June 2018 he will become coach of the Atalanta.
