= Simone Loria =

Italian footballer (born 1976)

Personal information
- Date of birth: 28 October 1976 (age 50)
- Place of birth: Turin, Italy
- Height: 1.86 m (6 ft 1 in)
- Position: Centre back

Youth career
- Juventus

Senior career*
| Years | Team | Apps | (Gls) |
| 1996–1997 | Olbia | 31 | (1) |
| 1997–1999 | Battipagliese | 44 | (2) |
| 1999–2000 | Nocerina | 28 | (0) |
| 2000–2002 | Lecco | 52 | (6) |
| 2002–2005 | Cagliari | 87 | (11) |
| 2005–2007 | Atalanta | 63 | (11) |
| 2007–2008 | Siena | 36 | (5) |
| 2008–2011 | Roma | 15 | (3) |
| 2009–2010 | → Torino (loan) | 29 | (2) |
| 2011–2012 | Bologna | 9 | (1) |
| 2013 | Cuneo | 8 | (0) |
| Total | | 402 | (42) |
- * Club domestic league appearances and goals

Simone Loria (born 28 October 1976) is an Italian former footballer who played as a centre-back.

Loria is known for having scored a spectacular bicycle kick from the edge of the penalty area in a home match against Chievo in 2006, while playing for Atalanta.

== Career ==
Loria began his career at Juventus, club giant of his hometown Turin. After graduation from youth teams, he spent 5 seasons in Serie C1 and Serie C2. In mid-2002, he was signed by Cagliari of Serie B. He quickly became a regular starter and contributed to the team's promotion to Serie A in summer 2004. In his first Serie A season, he played 20 matches. At the end of season, he joined Atalanta (with Michele Canini moving in the opposite direction), a club which had just been relegated to Serie B. He won the Serie B championship with the club and played in Serie A again the following season.

=== Siena ===
In July 2007, he signed a 4-year contract with Siena for €750,000 transfer fee.

=== Roma ===
Loria completed a transfer to Roma from Siena along with his teammate Artur Moraes on 25 June 2008 in an exchange deal which saw Roma goalkeeper Gianluca Curci move to Siena in a co-ownership deal and Roma midfielder Ahmed Barusso move on loan to the Tuscan-based club. Daniele Galloppa, owned by both Roma & Siena, also became an exclusively Siena player as a part of the deal. He signed a 3-year deal and he was valued €2.8 million.

After disappointing performances, Loria was loaned to Torino which recently sold Cesare Natali on 6 July 2009. During 2010–11 Serie A Loria spent most of his time on the bench or even the stands until the classic match against Inter. Substituting Jérémy Ménez in the second half he scored the (temporary) 4–3, his second goal for Roma.

=== Bologna ===
He moved to Serie A club Bologna in July 2011. He scored his first goal for Bologna on 30 October, against Atalanta. Bologna won the match 3–1.

=== Cuneo ===
On 19 February 2013 Loria was signed by Lega Pro Prima Divisione club Cuneo in a 1 1/2-year deal. On 4 July he was released.

== Honours ==
Atalanta

- Serie B: 2005–06
