= Claudio Rivalta =

Italian footballer (born 1978)

Personal information
- Date of birth: 30 June 1978 (age 48)
- Place of birth: Ravenna, Italy
- Height: 1.73 m (5 ft 8 in)
- Position: Defender

Senior career*
Years	Team	Apps	(Gls)
1995–1999	Cesena	129	(3)
1999–2001	Perugia	46	(0)
2001–2004	Vicenza	94	(2)
2004–2009	Atalanta	136	(5)
2009–2011	Torino	25	(0)
2011–2012	Spezia	13	(0)

International career^{‡}
1993–1994	Italy U-16	3	(0)
1996–2000	Italy U-21	16	(0)
- * Club domestic league appearances and goals as of 13 October 2012 (UTC) ‡ National team caps and goals as of 00:00, 26 September 2000 (UTC)

Claudio Rivalta (born 30 June 1978) is a retired Italian football defender. He represented Italy at the 2000 Summer Olympics.

== Career ==
In June 2004 Rivalta was signed by Atalanta B.C., with Valerio Foglio moving in the opposite direction.

In October 2008, Rivalta extended his contract with Atalanta, keeping him at the club until June 2011.

In January 2009, Rivalta was sold to Torino and signed a three-year contract worth €800,000.
