= Luca Saudati =

Italian footballer

Personal information
- Date of birth: 18 January 1978 (age 48)
- Place of birth: Milan, Italy
- Height: 1.82 m (6 ft 0 in)
- Positions: Left winger; forward

Team information
- Current team: Spezia

Youth career
- 1994–1996: A.C. Milan

Senior career*
Years	Team	Apps	(Gls)
1996–2001	A.C. Milan	1	(0)
1997	→ Lugano (loan)	4	(1)
1997	→ Monza (loan)	4	(0)
1997–1998	→ Lecco (loan)	22	(8)
1998–1999	→ Como (loan)	30	(11)
1999–2000	→ Empoli (loan)	29	(17)
2000–2001	→ Perugia (loan)	25	(7)
2001–2006	Atalanta	56	(7)
2002–2003	→ Empoli (loan)	7	(2)
2005	→ Empoli (loan)	18	(3)
2006	→ Lecce (loan)	4	(0)
2006–2010	Empoli	97	(23)
2010–2011	Spezia	8	(2)
Total		305	(81)
- * Club domestic league appearances and goals as of August 28, 2009

Luca Saudati (born 18 January 1978 in Milan) is an Italian footballer who played as a winger or as a second striker.

== Football career ==
Saudati started his career at the A.C. Milan youth system. After relatively unsuccessful loan stints at various clubs - including Lugano of the Swiss Super League, Monza of Serie B, Lecco and Como of Serie C1, Empoli of Serie B and Perugia of Serie A - he eventually joined Atalanta of Serie A in June 2001, tagged for 18 billion Italian lire. as part of Massimo Donati and Cristian Zenoni's deal to Milan for 60 billion lire.

However, after scoring no goals in a whole season for Atalanta, he was loaned out again to Empoli of Serie A in the summer of 2002 after poor performance. He broke his leg in November, ruling him out of training and play. When he returned to Atalanta in the summer of 2003, they had dropped to Serie B; despite them being promoted that season, he made just 5 appearances and was loaned once again to Empoli of Serie B in January 2005.

He returned to Atalanta once again in summer 2005, again in Serie B. He scored 3 goals in 12 games before loaned out again to Serie A team Lecce, to join his former coach Silvio Baldini while at Empoli during the 2002–03 season, but soon Baldini was sacked by the club and Saudati only made 4 appearances in Serie A.

Fortunes changed for Saudati in the summer of 2006. He joined Empoli of Serie A on free transfer in summer 2006, and signed a three-year contract, where he became team-topscorer of the 2006–07 season with 14 league goals and four in the Italian Cup. Saudati's natural position is left winger but during his time at Empoli enjoyed much success as a second striker.

Saudati was, not surprisingly, voted into the 2006–07 Italian PFA Giocatori Squadra Dell'Anno (Italy's PFA player's team of the season) whilst he also became Empoli's player of the year and received an award for most improved player in the 2006–07 season.

== Honours ==
Empoli

- Serie B (1) : 2004–05
