= Michele Marcolini =

Italian footballer (born 1975)

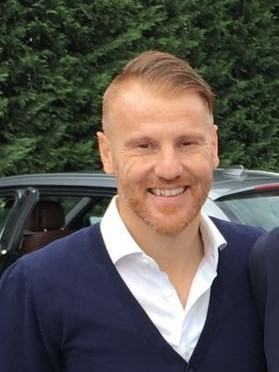
- Marcolini in 2016

Personal information
- Date of birth: 2 October 1975 (age 51)
- Place of birth: Savona, Italy
- Height: 1.77 m (5 ft 9 1/2 in)
- Position: Midfielder

Youth career
- Vado
- –1988: U.S.D. Quiliano
- 1988–1989: Pegliese
- 1989–1994: Torino

Senior career*
Years	Team	Apps	(Gls)
1990–1994	Torino	0	(0)
1990–1991	→ Sora (loan)	22	(0)
1994–1997	Sora	67	(3)
1997–2001	Bari	86	(5)
2001–2003	Vicenza	70	(11)
2003–2006	Atalanta	108	(12)
2006–2011	Chievo	145	(19)
2011–2012	Padova	34	(1)
2012–2013	Lumezzane	26	(2)
Total		558	(53)

International career
1991	Italy U16	6	(0)
1993–1994	Italy U18	3	(1)

Managerial career
- 2013–2014: Lumezzane
- 2014–2015: Real Vicenza
- 2015: Pavia
- 2016–2017: Santarcangelo
- 2017–2018: Alessandria
- 2018: Avellino
- 2018–2019: AlbinoLeffe
- 2019–2020: Chievo
- 2020: Novara
- 2021–2022: AlbinoLeffe
- 2023–2024: Malta
- * Club domestic league appearances and goals

Michele Marcolini (born 2 October 1975) is an Italian football coach and former footballer, who played as a midfielder. He last was the manager of the Malta national football team.

== Club career ==
A Torino youth system product, Marcolini made his senior debut with Sora in 1994. In 1997, he joined Bari, with whom he spent four seasons and also made his Serie A debut. He then played at Serie B level for two seasons with Vicenza, and then back to top flight football with Atalanta and Chievo. On 27 June 2011, he mutually terminated his contract with Chievo. He then signed a one-year contract with Serie B side Padova on 4 July 2011, and ended his career in 2013 after a lone season with Lega Pro Prima Divisione club Lumezzane.

== Coaching career ==
In June 2013 Marcolini took his first managerial role, replacing Gianluca Festa as head coach of Lumezzane.

In June 2014 he was named new head coach of Lega Pro club Real Vicenza, being however sacked later in January 2015 and then re-appointed in February to complete the season in seventh place.

He successively served as head coach of Pavia from August to December 2015, and then took over at Santarcangelo for the club's full 2016–17 Lega Pro campaign.

On 21 November 2017, he was appointed at the helm of Serie C club Alessandria, in place of Cristian Stellini.

On 27 November 2018, he was hired as head coach of Serie C club AlbinoLeffe, with the team in the relegation zone.

On 4 July 2019, he was hired as head coach of his former club, freshly relegated Serie B club, Chievo. On 1 March 2020, he was fired by Chievo, with the team in 8th place.

On 2 November 2020, he signed with Serie C club Novara. He was fired on 14 December 2020 after the club gained 4 points in 7 games under his helm.

On 5 July 2021, Marcolini returned to AlbinoLeffe. After completing the season with the Lombardian club, he was dismissed on 24 May 2022.

On 15 December 2022, Marcolini was hired as the new head coach of the Malta national football team, succeeding Devis Mangia to the role, agreeing a contract until the end of 2024.

On 13 September 2024, despite winning his last game in charge of Malta against Andorra, Marcolini was relieved of his duties.

== Honours ==
=== Player ===
Atalanta

- Serie B: 2005–06

Chievo Verona

- Serie B: 2007–08

=== Coach ===
Alessandria

- Coppa Italia Serie C: 2017–18

== Managerial statistics ==
As of match played 14 November 2024

Team	From	To	Record				
Team	From	To	G	W	D	L	Win %
Malta	2023	2024	18	5	2	11	27.78
Total			18	5	2	11	27.78
