= Duccio Innocenti =

Italian association football (born 1975)

Personal information
- Full name: Duccio Innocenti
- Date of birth: September 20, 1975 (age 51)
- Place of birth: Prato, Italy
- Height: 1.85 m (6 ft 1 in)
- Position: Defender

Team information
- Current team: Lucchese

Youth career
- 1993–1995: Fiorentina

Senior career*
Years	Team	Apps	(Gls)
1995–1996	Pontedera	29	(2)
1996–1998	Lucchese	56	(2)
1998–2003	Bari	145	(8)
2003–2006	Atalanta	48	(0)
2006	→ Messina (loan)	7	(0)
2006–2007	AlbinoLeffe	35	(2)
2007–2009	Grosseto	45	(0)
2009	→ Vicenza (loan)	7	(0)
2009–2012	Lucchese		

Managerial career
- 2012–2013: Lucchese
- * Club domestic league appearances and goals

Duccio Innocenti (born 20 September 1975) is an Italian football manager and former player, who played as a defender. He won a gold medal at the 1997 Mediterranean Games in Bari with the Italy national under-21 football team.

== Career ==
=== Player ===
Innocenti started his career at Fiorentina. Afterward he spent seasons with Pontedera of Serie C2 and Lucchese of Serie B, he was signed by Bari in summer 1998. Innocenti made his Serie A debut on 13 September 1998 against Venezia.

He followed Bari relegated in summer 2001, and played until summer 2003.

He was signed by Lazio on free transfer on 2 July 2003. But on 18 July 2003, he was transferred to Atalanta as part of the deal of Ousmane Dabo and Luciano Zauri.

He was a regular player for Atalanta in their 2003-04 season, but then he was promoted back to Serie A, he only played 8 games. After Atalanta relegated again in summer 2005, he played 6 times.

In January 2006, he was loaned to Messina for their rescue mission on Serie A seat, and lastly Messina stayed in the top division, but the club not willing to sign him permanently.

On 30 August 2006, he finally signed by AlbinoLeffe of Serie B. On 13 August 2007, he was signed by Serie B newcomer Grosseto. In February 2009, he was loaned, until the end of the season, to Vicenza Calcio From the season 2009-10 to 2011-12 he played for Lucchese in Eccellenza Tuscany.

=== Coach ===
In the season 2012-13 he is the manager of Lucchese in the Serie D.
