= Gianpaolo Bellini =

Italian footballer

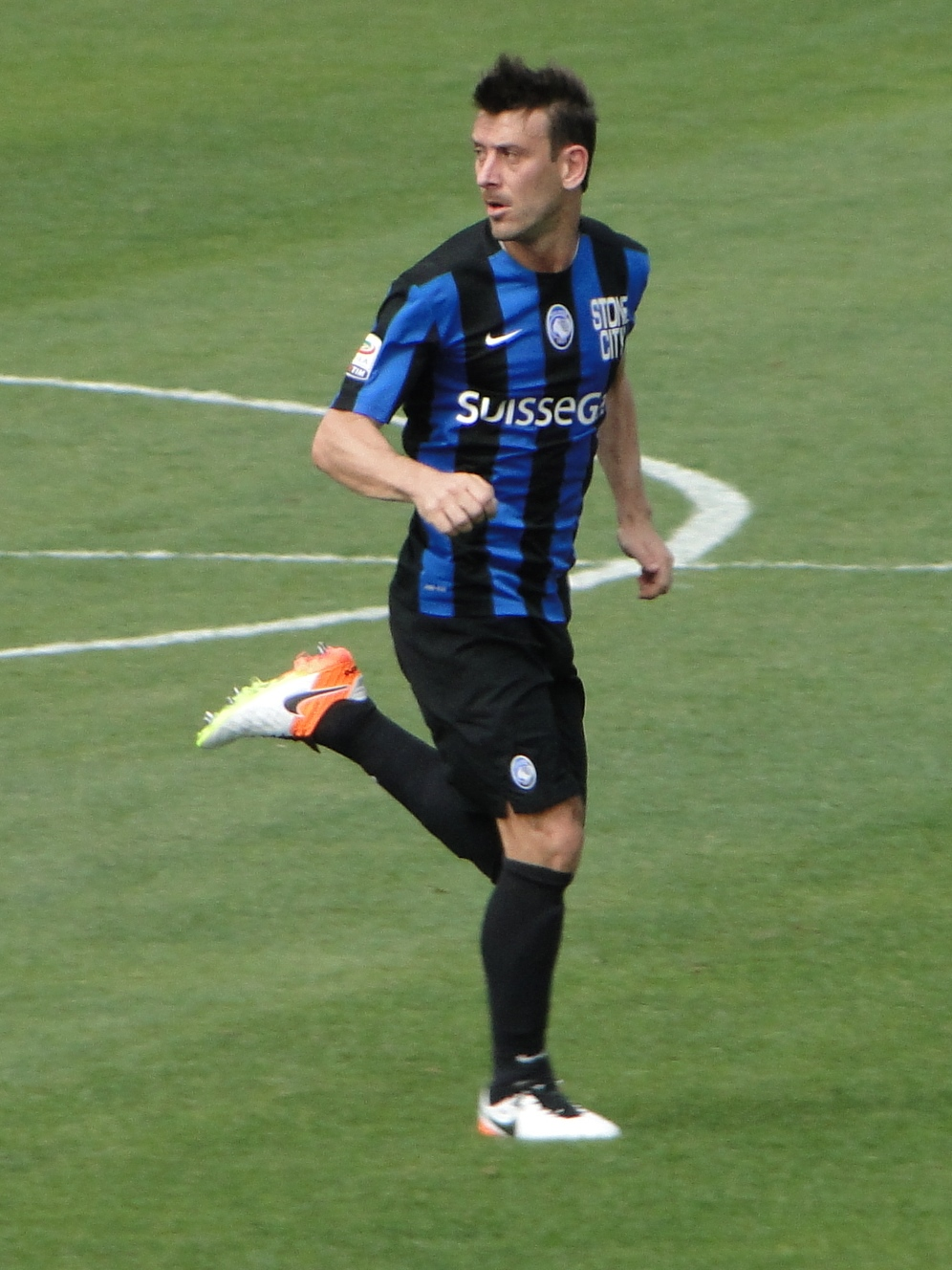
- Bellini playing for Atalanta in 2016

Personal information
- Date of birth: 27 March 1980 (age 46)
- Place of birth: Sarnico, Italy
- Height: 1.80 m (5 ft 11 in)
- Position: Defender

Youth career
- 1997–1998: Atalanta

Senior career*
| Years | Team | Apps | (Gls) |
| 1998–2016 | Atalanta | 396 | (9) |

International career
| 2000–2002 | Italy U-21 | 15 | (0) |
- * Club domestic league appearances and goals

Gianpaolo Bellini (born 27 March 1980) is an Italian former professional footballer who played as a defender. Bellini is a one-club man; he spent his entire professional career with Atalanta. His primary position was left-back, but he was also capable of playing on the right flank and as a central defender.

== Club career ==
Born in Sarnico, Province of Bergamo, Bellini played his first league match on 11 April 1999 for Atalanta, at that time in Serie B.

In the 2009–10 season, Bellini played as left-back, while Thomas Manfredini, Paolo Bianco, Leonardo Talamonti were used as central defenders. On 26 July 2010, he and Manfredini signed a new 3+1-year contract with the club.

On 8 May 2016, Bellini scored in his final game, a 1–1 Serie A draw against Udinese at the Stadio di Bergamo. He held the record of most appearances for Atalanta with 435 for more than a decade, 279 of which were in the Serie A, until being surpassed by Marten de Roon in March 2026.

== International career ==
Along with Cesare Natali, his teammate at Atalanta, Bellini was called up to the Italy under-21 side for the 2002 UEFA European Under-21 Football Championship. They partnered in 2 matches at the tournament as Italy reached the semi-finals.

== Managerial career ==
In 2017, Bellini was named assistant head coach of Atalanta's Primavera (under-21) team. After five years as a deputy to Massimo Brambilla, in 2022, Bellini was appointed head coach of Atalanta's under-17 team.

== Honours ==
Atalanta

- Serie B: 2005–06, 2010–11
