= 2005–06 Torino FC season =

Torino
2005–06 season
- President: Attilio Romero; Pierluigi Marengo; Urbano Cairo
- Head coach: Daniele Arrigoni; Paolo Stringara; Gianni De Biasi
- Stadium: Stadio delle Alpi
- Serie B: 3rd (promoted)
- Top goalscorer: League: Elvis Abbruscato (14); All: Elvis Abbruscato (15)
- Highest home attendance: 58,560
- Lowest home attendance: 24,995
| Home colours | Away colours |

The 2005–06 season was the 100th season in the existence of Torino FC and the club's third consecutive season in the second division of Italian football.

== Players ==
=== First-team squad ===
Squad at end of season

Note: Flags indicate national team as defined under FIFA eligibility rules; some limited exceptions apply. Players may hold more than one non-FIFA nationality.

| No. | Pos. | Nation | Player |
|---|---|---|---|
| 1 | GK | ITA | Angelo Pagotto |
| 3 | DF | ITA | Jacopo Balestri |
| 4 | DF | ITA | Oscar Brevi (Captain) |
| 5 | DF | ITA | Giovanni Orfei |
| 6 | DF | ITA | Luca Ungari |
| 7 | FW | ITA | Enrico Fantini |
| 8 | MF | ITA | Fabio Gallo |
| 9 | FW | ITA | Roberto Muzzi |
| 10 | MF | ITA | Claudio Ferrarese |
| 11 | MF | BIH | Vedin Musić |
| 14 | MF | ITA | Raffaele Longo |
| 16 | MF | GHA | Mark Edusei |
| 17 | MF | SCG | Nikola Lazetić |

| No. | Pos. | Nation | Player |
|---|---|---|---|
| 19 | FW | ITA | Elvis Abbruscato |
| 20 | MF | ITA | Alessandro Rosina |
| 21 | DF | ITA | Davide Nicola |
| 22 | FW | ITA | Roberto Stellone |
| 23 | MF | ITA | Andrea Ardito |
| 26 | DF | ITA | Luigi Martinelli |
| 27 | DF | SEN | Diaw Doudou |
| 28 | MF | ITA | Tommaso Vailatti |
| 30 | FW | GRE | Zisis Vryzas |
| 31 | GK | ITA | Alberto Maria Fontana |
| 70 | GK | ITA | Massimo Taibi |
| 79 | DF | ITA | Matteo Melara |

=== Left club during season ===
Note: Flags indicate national team as defined under FIFA eligibility rules; some limited exceptions apply. Players may hold more than one non-FIFA nationality.

| No. | Pos. | Nation | Player |
|---|---|---|---|
| 8 | DF | BRA | Ronaldo Vanin (to Catanzaro) |
| 15 | MF | ITA | Andrea Gentile (return from loan to Messina) |
| 18 | MF | ITA | Alessandro Campo (to Cittadella) |

| No. | Pos. | Nation | Player |
|---|---|---|---|
| 19 | FW | ITA | Liborio Bongiovanni (to Pro Sesto) |
| 44 | FW | ITA | Claudio De Sousa (on loan to Catanzaro) |

== Competitions ==
=== Overall record ===
| Competition | First match | Last match | Starting round | Final position | Record | | | | | | | |
| Competition | First match | Last match | Starting round | Final position | Pld | W | D | L | GF | GA | GD | Win % |
|---|---|---|---|---|---|---|---|---|---|---|---|---|
| Serie B | 10 September 2005 | 28 May 2006 | Matchday 1 | 3rd | 42 | 21 | 13 | 8 | 51 | 31 | +20 | 50.00 |
| Total | | | | | 42 | 21 | 13 | 8 | 51 | 31 | +20 | 50.00 |

Last updated: 28 May 2006
Source: Competitions

=== Serie B ===
==== League table ====
| Pos | Team | Pld | W | D | L | GF | GA | GD | Pts | Promotion or relegation |
|---|---|---|---|---|---|---|---|---|---|---|
| 1 | Atalanta (P, C) | 42 | 24 | 9 | 9 | 61 | 39 | +22 | 81 | Promotion to Serie A |
| 2 | Catania (P) | 42 | 22 | 12 | 8 | 67 | 42 | +25 | 78 | Promotion to Serie A |
| 3 | Torino (O, P) | 42 | 21 | 13 | 8 | 51 | 31 | +20 | 76 | Qualification to promotion play-offs |
| 4 | Mantova | 42 | 18 | 15 | 9 | 46 | 35 | +11 | 69 | Qualification to promotion play-offs |
| 5 | Modena | 42 | 17 | 16 | 9 | 59 | 41 | +18 | 67 | Qualification to promotion play-offs |

Source: Almanacco Illustrato del Calcio 2007, Panini Edizioni, Modena, November 2006
Rules for classification: 1) points; 2) head-to-head points; 3) head-to-head goal difference; 4) head-to-head goals scored; 5) goal difference; 6) number of goals scored.
(C) Champions; (O) Play-off winners; (P) Promoted

==== Results summary ====
| Overall | | | | | | | | Home | | | | | | Away | | | | | |
| Pld | W | D | L | GF | GA | GD | Pts | W | D | L | GF | GA | GD | W | D | L | GF | GA | GD |
|---|---|---|---|---|---|---|---|---|---|---|---|---|---|---|---|---|---|---|---|
| 42 | 21 | 13 | 8 | 51 | 31 | +20 | 76 | 13 | 7 | 1 | 29 | 12 | +17 | 8 | 6 | 7 | 22 | 19 | +3 |

Last updated: 28 May 2006.
Source: Competitive matches

==== Results by round ====
| Round | 1 | 2 | 3 | 4 | 5 | 6 | 7 | 8 | 9 | 10 | 11 | 12 | 13 | 14 | 15 | 16 | 17 | 18 | 19 | 20 | 21 | 22 | 23 | 24 | 25 | 26 | 27 | 28 | 29 | 30 | 31 | 32 | 33 | 34 | 35 | 36 | 37 | 38 | 39 | 40 | 41 | 42 |
|---|---|---|---|---|---|---|---|---|---|---|---|---|---|---|---|---|---|---|---|---|---|---|---|---|---|---|---|---|---|---|---|---|---|---|---|---|---|---|---|---|---|---|
| Ground | A | H | A | H | A | H | H | A | H | A | H | A | H | A | H | H | A | H | A | H | A | H | A | H | A | H | A | A | H | A | H | A | H | A | H | A | A | H | A | H | A | H |
| Result | W | D | W | W | L | D | W | W | D | D | W | L | W | D | W | W | L | W | L | D | W | D | D | L | D | D | D | L | W | D | D | L | W | W | W | L | W | W | W | W | W | W |
| Position | 1 | 2 | 1 | 1 | 5 | 6 | 4 | 2 | 3 | 3 | 2 | 3 | 2 | 2 | 2 | 2 | 2 | 2 | 3 | 4 | 3 | 3 | 4 | 4 | 6 | 5 | 5 | 6 | 6 | 6 | 6 | 7 | 7 | 6 | 5 | 5 | 4 | 3 | 3 | 3 | 3 | 3 |

Source: Competitive matches
A = Away; H = Home; W = Win; D = Draw; L = Loss; = Leader, Serie A; = Serie A; = Promotion play-offs; = Relegation play-offs; = 2006–07 Serie C1

==== Matches ====
| 10 September 2005 4 | Torino | 1–0 | AlbinoLeffe | Turin |
| 16:00 CEST (UTC+2) | Fantini 16' | | | Stadium: Stadio delle Alpi; Attendance: 29,825; Referee: Oberdan Pantana |

| 17 September 2005 5 | Atalanta | 2–1 | Torino | Bergamo |
| 16:00 CEST (UTC+2) | Ventola 19'; Loria 55' | | Stellone 61' | Stadium: Stadio Atleti Azzurri d'Italia; Attendance: 9,513; Referee: Stefano Farina |

| 20 September 2005 6 | Torino | 0–0 | Crotone | Turin |
| 20:30 CEST (UTC+2) | | | | Stadium: Stadio delle Alpi; Attendance: 20,260; Referee: Christian Brighi |

| 24 September 2005 7 | Torino | 2–0 | Vicenza | Turin |
| 16:00 CEST (UTC+2) | Muzzi 42'; Stellone 90+1' | | | Stadium: Stadio delle Alpi; Attendance: 21,486; Referee: Salvatore Racalbuto |

| 27 September 2005 1 | Pescara | 0–2 | Torino | Pescara |
| 18:30 CEST (UTC+2) | | | Stellone 71'; Fantini 90+1' | Stadium: Stadio Adriatico; Attendance: 4,323; Referee: Paolo Mazzoleni |

| 1 October 2005 8 | Catanzaro | 0–1 | Torino | Catanzaro |
| 16:00 CEST (UTC+2) | | | Muzzi 90+4' | Stadium: Stadio Nicola Ceravolo; Attendance: 7,281; Referee: Gianluca Rocchi |

| 5 October 2005 3 | Arezzo | 1–2 | Torino | Arezzo |
| 20:30 CEST (UTC+2) | Abbruscato 45+2' (pen.) | | Fantini 17', 36' | Stadium: Stadio Città di Arezzo; Attendance: 6,783; Referee: Antonio Giannoccaro |

| 9 October 2005 9 | Torino | 0–0 | Bologna | Turin |
| 15:00 CEST (UTC+2) | | | | Stadium: Stadio delle Alpi; Attendance: 29,555; Referee: Tiziano Pieri |

| 15 October 2005 10 | Ternana | 0–0 | Torino | Terni |
| 16:00 CEST (UTC+2) | | | | Stadium: Stadio Libero Liberati; Attendance: 4,718; Referee: Nicola Ayroldi |

| 18 October 2005 2 | Torino | 0–0 | Bari | Turin |
| 18:30 CEST (UTC+2) | | | | Stadium: Stadio delle Alpi; Attendance: 22,305; Referee: Nicola Stefanini |

| 22 October 2005 11 | Torino | 2–1 | Piacenza | Turin |
| 16:00 CEST (UTC+2) | Rosina 4' (pen.); Muzzi 12' | | Ganci 24' | Stadium: Stadio delle Alpi; Attendance: 23,060; Referee: Mario Mazzoleni |

| 26 October 2005 12 | Mantova | 1–0 | Torino | Mantua |
| 20:30 CEST (UTC+2) | Tarana 23' | | | Stadium: Stadio Danilo Martelli; Attendance: 13,547; Referee: Emidio Morganti |

| 29 October 2005 13 | Torino | 1–0 | Cesena | Turin |
| 16:00 CEST (UTC+2) | Fantini 73' | | | Stadium: Stadio delle Alpi; Attendance: 22,824; Referee: Luca Banti |

| 4 November 2005 14 | Catania | 1–1 | Torino | Catania |
| 20:45 CET (UTC+1) | Mascara 6' (pen.) | | Muzzi 24' | Stadium: Stadio Angelo Massimino; Attendance: 14,776; Referee: Massimo De Santis |

| 13 November 2005 15 | Torino | 2–1 | Modena | Turin |
| 15:00 CET (UTC+1) | Stellone 36'; Fantini 69' | | Bucchi 82' (pen.) | Stadium: Stadio delle Alpi; Attendance: 27,209; Referee: Nicola Ayroldi |

| 19 November 2005 16 | Torino | 2–1 | Hellas Verona | Turin |
| 16:00 CET (UTC+1) | Muzzi 76'; Biasi 80' (o.g.) | | Munari 23' | Stadium: Stadio delle Alpi; Attendance: 25,025; Referee: Matteo Trefoloni |

| 26 November 2005 17 | Avellino | 1–0 | Torino | Avellino |
| 16:00 CET (UTC+1) | Danilevicius 2' | | | Stadium: Stadio Partenio; Attendance: 5,899; Referee: Massimo De Santis |

| 3 December 2005 18 | Torino | 2–1 | Triestina | Turin |
| 16:05 CET (UTC+1) | Muzzi 32'; Rosina 64' | | Tulli 76' | Stadium: Stadio delle Alpi; Attendance: 21,877; Referee: Gianluca Paparesta |

| 10 December 2005 19 | Rimini | 2–1 | Torino | Rimini |
| 16:00 CET (UTC+1) | D'Angelo 13' (pen.); Ricchiuti 81' | | Longo 55' | Stadium: Stadio Romeo Neri; Attendance: 7,360; Referee: Oberdan Pantana |

| 16 December 2005 20 | Torino | 1–1 | Brescia | Turin |
| 20:45 CET (UTC+1) | De Sousa 87' | | Strada 45+1' | Stadium: Stadio delle Alpi; Attendance: 22,420; Referee: Stefano Farina |

| 20 December 2005 21 | Cremonese | 0–1 | Torino | Cremona |
| 20:30 CET (UTC+1) | | | Fantini 72' | Stadium: Stadio Giovanni Zini; Attendance: 3,288; Referee: Paolo Mazzoleni |

| 7 January 2006 22 | Torino | 1–1 | Pescara | Turin |
| 16:00 CET (UTC+1) | Melara 27' | | Jadid 17' | Stadium: Stadio delle Alpi; Attendance: 25,251; Referee: Marco Gabriele |

| 14 January 2006 23 | Bari | 2–2 | Torino | Bari |
| 16:00 CET (UTC+1) | Pagano 86', 90+1' | | Fantini 25'; Rosina 78' | Stadium: Stadio San Nicola; Attendance: 4.773; Referee: Gianluca Rocchi |

| 18 January 2006 24 | Torino | 1–2 | Arezzo | Turin |
| 20:45 CET (UTC+1) | Rosina 77' (pen.) | | Antonini 31'; Floro Flores 79' | Stadium: Stadio delle Alpi; Attendance: 21,279; Referee: Paolo Dondarini |

| 21 January 2006 25 | AlbinoLeffe | 0–0 | Torino | Bergamo |
| 16:00 CET (UTC+1) | | | | Stadium: Stadio Atleti Azzurri d'Italia; Attendance: 1,959; Referee: Paolo Bertini |

| 30 January 2006 26 | Torino | 2–2 | Atalanta | Turin |
| 20:45 CET (UTC+1) | Rosina 20', 82' | | Ventola 67', 71' | Stadium: Stadio delle Alpi; Attendance: 23,013; Referee: Stefano Farina |

| 4 February 2006 27 | Crotone | 1–1 | Torino | Crotone |
| 16:00 CET (UTC+1) | | | Rosina 49' | Stadium: Stadio Ezio Scida; Attendance: 6,689; Referee: Nicola Ayroldi |

| 7 February 2006 28 | Vicenza | 3–2 | Torino | Vicenza |
| 20:30 CET (UTC+1) | B. Carbone 17' (pen.); Sgrigna 32'; Cavalli 61' | | Longo 30'; Rosina 74' | Stadium: Stadio Romeo Menti; Attendance: 5,077; Referee: Luca Banti |

| 11 February 2006 29 | Torino | 2–0 | Catanzaro | Turin |
| 16:00 CET (UTC+1) | O. Brevi 76'; Abbruscato 86' | | | Stadium: Stadio delle Alpi; Attendance: 22,317; Referee: Stefano Cassarà |

| 24 February 2006 30 | Bologna | 1–1 | Torino | Bologna |
| 20:45 CET (UTC+1) | Marazzina 48' | | Stellone 85' | Stadium: Stadio Renato Dall'Ara; Attendance: 9,120; Referee: Massimiliano Saccani |

| 4 March 2006 31 | Torino | 1–1 | Ternana | Turin |
| 16:00 CET (UTC+1) | Rosina 9' | | S. Russo 83' | Stadium: Stadio delle Alpi; Attendance: 21,687; Referee: Maurizio Ciampi |

| 11 March 2006 32 | Piacenza | 1–0 | Torino | Piacenza |
| 16:00 CET (UTC+1) | Cacia 41' (pen.) | | | Stadium: Stadio Leonardo Garilli; Attendance: 5,695; Referee: Domenico Messina |

| 18 March 2006 33 | Torino | 2–0 | Mantova | Turin |
| 16:00 CET (UTC+1) | Muzzi 48'; Ferrarese 56' | | | Stadium: Stadio delle Alpi; Attendance: 23,714; Referee: Daniele Tombolini |

| 24 March 2006 34 | Cesena | 1–2 | Torino | Cesena |
| 20:45 CET (UTC+1) | Salvetti 58' (pen.) | | Nicola 62'; L. Martinelli 69' | Stadium: Stadio Dino Manuzzi; Attendance: 12,130; Referee: Pasquale Rodomonti |

| 31 March 2006 35 | Torino | 2–1 | Catania | Turin |
| 20:45 CEST (UTC+2) | Abbruscato 34'; Rosina 90' (pen.) | | De Zerbi 25' | Stadium: Stadio delle Alpi; Attendance: 31,944; Referee: Gianluca Paparesta |

| 8 April 2006 36 | Modena | 2–1 | Torino | Modena |
| 16:00 CEST (UTC+2) | Graffiedi 15'; Asamoah 90+1' | | Abbruscato 85' | Stadium: Stadio Alberto Braglia; Attendance: 11,343; Referee: Domenico Messina |

| 23 April 2006 37 | Hellas Verona | 0–1 | Torino | Verona |
| 15:00 CEST (UTC+2) | | | Stellone 83' | Stadium: Stadio Marcantonio Bentegodi; Attendance: 9,988; Referee: Paolo Mazzoleni |

| 29 April 2006 38 | Torino | 1–0 | Avellino | Turin |
| 16:00 CEST (UTC+2) | Melara 70' | | | Stadium: Stadio delle Alpi; Attendance: 24,939; Referee: Paolo Dondarini |

| 6 May 2006 39 | Triestina | 0–2 | Torino | Trieste |
| 16:00 CEST (UTC+2) | | | Stellone 55', 69' | Stadium: Stadio Nereo Rocco; Attendance: 7,242; Referee: Tagliavento |

| 13 May 2006 40 | Torino | 1–0 | Rimini | Turin |
| 16:00 CEST (UTC+2) | Rosina 29' | | | Stadium: Stadio delle Alpi; Attendance: 27,452; Referee: Emidio Morganti |

| 21 May 2006 41 | Brescia | 0–1 | Torino | Brescia |
| 15:00 CEST (UTC+2) | | | Abbruscato 45' | Stadium: Stadio Mario Rigamonti; Attendance: 8,629; Referee: Nicola Ayroldi |

| 28 May 2006 42 | Torino | 3–0 | Cremonese | Turin |
| 15:00 CEST (UTC+2) | Vryzas 7', 31'; Vailatti 86' | | | Stadium: Stadio delle Alpi; Attendance: 37,450; Referee: Oscar Girardi |

=== Promotion play-offs ===
==== Semi-finals ====
| 1 June 2006 First leg | Cesena | 1–1 | Torino | Cesena |
| 19:00 CEST (UTC+2) | Salvetti 16' | | Longo 45' | Stadium: Stadio Dino Manuzzi; Attendance: 11,911; Referee: Stefano Farina |

| 4 June 2006 Second leg | Torino | 1–0 (2–1 agg.) | Cesena | Turin |
| 21:00 CEST (UTC+2) | Balestri 43' | | | Stadium: Stadio delle Alpi; Attendance: 30,173; Referee: Emidio Morganti |

==== Final ====
| 8 June 2006 First leg | Mantova | 4–2 | Torino | Mantova |
| 20:45 CEST (UTC+2) | Cioffi 8'; Caridi 22', 67' (pen.); Noselli 48' (pen.) | | Longo 6'; Abbruscato 74' | Stadium: Stadio Danilo Martelli; Attendance: 14,853; Referee: Tiziano Pieri |

| 11 June 2006 Second leg | Torino | 3–1 (5–5 agg.) | Mantova | Turin |
| 20:45 CEST (UTC+2) | Rosina 36' (pen.); Muzzi 64'; Nicola 95' | | Poggi 101' (pen.) | Stadium: Stadio delle Alpi; Attendance: 58,560; Referee: Stefano Farina |
Note: Torino was promoted to the 2006–07 Serie A as a better placed team in the regular season.
