= 2006–07 Torino FC season =

Torino
2006–07 season
- Chairman: Urbano Cairo
- Manager: Gianni De Biasi; Alberto Zaccheroni (from 7 September to 26 February); Gianni De Biasi
- Serie A: 16th
- Coppa Italia: Second round
- Top goalscorer: League: Alessandro Rosina (9); All: Alessandro Rosina (12)
- Highest home attendance: 24,000
- Average home league attendance: 20,500
Home colours	Away colours

During the 2006–07 Italian football season, Torino competed in Serie A.

== Season summary ==
Despite leading Torino to promotion to Serie A the previous season, manager Gianni De Biasi was sacked 3 days before the start of the season. Alberto Zaccheroni came to Torino after two years of unemployment to take the helm. Six consecutive defeats led to Zaccheroni being sacked and De Biasi being reinstated as manager. Torino ultimately finished in 16th, avoiding relegation and an immediate return to Serie B by one point.

== Kit ==
Torino's kit was manufactured by Asics and sponsored by insurance company Reale Mutua Assicurazioni.

== First-team squad ==
Squad at end of season

Note: Flags indicate national team as defined under FIFA eligibility rules; some limited exceptions apply. Players may hold more than one non-FIFA nationality.

No.	Pos.	Nation	Player
1	GK	(Italy) ITA	Massimo Taibi
2	DF	(Italy) ITA	Giuseppe Pancaro
3	DF	(Italy) ITA	Iacopo Balestri
4	DF	(Italy) ITA	Oscar Brevi
5	MF	(Italy) ITA	Fabio Gallo
6	DF	(Italy) ITA	Gabriele Cioffi
8	MF	(Italy) ITA	Simone Barone
9	FW	(Italy) ITA	Roberto Muzzi
10	MF	(Italy) ITA	Alessandro Rosina
11	FW	(Italy) ITA	Roberto Stellone
13	DF	(Italy) ITA	Cesare Bovo (on loan from Palermo)
14	DF	(Italy) ITA	Ivan Franceschini
15	MF	(Italy) ITA	Diego De Ascentis
16	FW	(Japan) JPN	Masashi Oguro

No.	Pos.	Nation	Player
17	MF	(Serbia) SRB	Nikola Lazetić
18	DF	(Italy) ITA	Angelo Ogbonna
19	FW	(Italy) ITA	Elvis Abbruscato
21	DF	(Ukraine) UKR	Serhiy Predko
22	DF	(Italy) ITA	Gianluca Comotto
23	MF	(Italy) ITA	Andrea Ardito
24	FW	(Ivory Coast) CIV	Axel Cédric Konan (on loan from Lecce)
25	DF	(Italy) ITA	Marco Di Loreto
26	DF	(Italy) ITA	Luigi Martinelli
31	GK	(Italy) ITA	Alberto Fontana
32	GK	(Italy) ITA	Christian Abbiati (on loan from Milan)
44	FW	(Italy) ITA	Claudio De Sousa
77	DF	(Italy) ITA	Francesco Coco (on loan from Inter Milan)
84	MF	(Italy) ITA	Pasquale Schiattarella

=== Left club during season ===
Note: Flags indicate national team as defined under FIFA eligibility rules; some limited exceptions apply. Players may hold more than one non-FIFA nationality.

No.	Pos.	Nation	Player
7	MF	(Italy) ITA	Stefano Fiore (on loan from Valencia)
20	MF	(Italy) ITA	Claudio Ferrarese (to Hellas Verona)
21	DF	(Bosnia and Herzegovina) BIH	Vedin Musić (on loan to Treviso)
27	DF	(Senegal) SEN	Doudou Diaw (to Cesena)

No.	Pos.	Nation	Player
28	MF	(Italy) ITA	Tommaso Vailatti (on loan to Vicenza)
40	GK	(Italy) ITA	Angelo Pagotto (to Grosseto)
55	DF	(Italy) ITA	Giovanni Orfei (to Salernitana)
79	DF	(Italy) ITA	Matteo Melara (to Ascoli)

== Competitions ==
=== Serie A ===
==== League table ====
Pos	Team	Pld	W	D	L	GF	GA	GD	Pts	Qualification or relegation
14	Reggina (Note: Fiorentina were docked 15 points, Reggina 11 points, Milan 8 points and Lazio 3 points, all for involvement in the 2006 Italian football scandal.)	38	12	15	11	52	50	+2	40	
15	Siena (Note: Siena were given a one-point deduction for a delay in payment of social security contributions.)	38	9	14	15	35	45	−10	40	
16	Torino	38	10	10	18	27	47	−20	40	
17	Cagliari	38	9	13	16	35	46	−11	40	
18	Chievo (R)	38	9	12	17	38	48	−10	39	Relegation to Serie B

Rules for classification: 1) points; 2) goal difference; 3) number of goals scored.
(R) Relegated

==== Results summary ====
Overall								Home						Away					
Pld	W	D	L	GF	GA	GD	Pts	W	D	L	GF	GA	GD	W	D	L	GF	GA	GD
38	10	10	18	34	44	−10	40	6	4	9	22	19	+3	4	6	9	12	25	−13

Source: Competitive matches

==== Results by round ====
Round	1	2	3	4	5	6	7	8	9	10	11	12	13	14	15	16	17	18	19	20	21	22	23	24	25	26	27	28	29	30	31	32	33	34	35	36	37	38
Ground	H	A	H	A	H	H	A	H	A	H	A	H	A	H	A	A	H	A	H	A	H	A	H	A	A	H	A	H	A	H	A	H	A	H	H	A	H	A
Result	D	L	L	D	L	W	D	L	D	D	L	W	W	W	D	W	L	D	L	L	L	L	L	L	L	W	L	W	W	D	L	L	D	L	W	W	D	L
Position	9	11	12	12	15	11	12	13	14	14	14	14	11	8	9	6	9	8	11	13	13	15	15	15	14	15	13	12	11	12	14	15	14	17	13	11	11	16

Source: Competitive matches
A = Away; H = Home; W = Win; D = Draw; L = Loss

==== Matches ====
10 September 2006 1	Torino	1–1	Parma	Turin
20:30 CEST (UTC+02:00)	Stellone 90'		Budan 55'	Stadium: Stadio Olimpico di Torino; Attendance: 21,095; Referee: Nicola Stefanini

17 September 2006 2	Udinese	2–0	Torino	Udine
15:00 CEST (UTC+02:00)	Di Natale 25'; Felipe 65'			Stadium: Stadio Friuli; Attendance: 14,465; Referee: Oberdan Pantana

20 September 2006 3	Torino	1–2	Siena	Turin
20:30 CEST (UTC+02:00)	Muzzi 40'		Frick 4', 35'	Stadium: Stadio Olimpico di Torino; Attendance: 19,227; Referee: Antonio Giannoccaro

24 September 2006 4	Reggina	1–1	Torino	Reggio Calabria
15:00 CEST (UTC+02:00)	Modesto 56'		Comotto 65'	Stadium: Stadio Oreste Granillo; Attendance: 6,903; Referee: Christian Brighi

30 September 2006 5	Torino	0–4	Lazio	Turin
20:30 CEST (UTC+02:00)			Rocchi 48'; Oddo 55' (pen.), 67'; Mauri 71'	Stadium: Stadio Olimpico di Torino; Attendance: 19,989; Referee: Tiziano Pieri

15 October 2006 6	Torino	1–0	Chievo	Turin
15:00 CEST (UTC+02:00)	Stellone 48'			Stadium: Stadio Olimpico di Torino; Attendance: 18,945; Referee: Paolo Bertini

21 October 2006 7	Cagliari	0–0	Torino	Cagliari
20:30 CEST (UTC+02:00)				Stadium: Stadio Sant'Elia; Attendance: 9,191; Referee: Paolo Tagliavento

25 October 2006 8	Torino	0–1	Fiorentina	Turin
20:30 CEST (UTC+02:00)			Jorgensen 13'	Stadium: Stadio Olimpico di Torino; Attendance: 20,670; Referee: Nicola Ayroldi

29 October 2006 9	Catania	1–1	Torino	Bari
15:00 CET (UTC+01:00)	Spinesi 20' (pen.)		I. Franceschini 85'	Stadium: Stadio San Nicola; Attendance: 0 Referee: Maurizio Ciampi

5 November 2006 10	Torino	1–1	Messina	Turin
15:00 CET (UTC+01:00)	Stellone 60'		Cordova 36'	Stadium: Stadio Olimpico di Torino; Attendance: 19,107; Referee: Andrea Romeo

12 November 2006 11	Palermo	3–0	Torino	Palermo
15:00 CET (UTC+01:00)	Corini 43'; Di Michele 69'; Amauri 79'			Stadium: Stadio Renzo Barbera; Attendance: 26,642; Referee: Luca Palanca

19 November 2006 12	Torino	1–0	Sampdoria	Turin
20:30 CET (UTC+01:00)	Rosina 79' (pen.)			Stadium: Stadio Olimpico di Torino; Attendance: 20,565; Referee: Luca Banti

26 November 2006 13	Atalanta	1–2	Torino	Bergamo
15:00 CET (UTC+01:00)	Loria 90+5'		Rivalta 78' (o.g.); Rosina 88'	Stadium: Stadio Atleti Azzurri d'Italia; Attendance: 12,580; Referee: Paolo Dondarini

3 December 2006 14	Torino	1–0	Empoli	Turin
15:00 CET (UTC+01:00)	Comotto 88'			Stadium: Stadio Olimpico di Torino; Attendance: 22,662; Referee: Domenico Celi

10 December 2006 15	Milan	0–0	Torino	Milan
15:00 CET (UTC+01:00)				Stadium: San Siro; Attendance: 50,422; Referee: Oscar Girardi

17 December 2006 16	Ascoli	0–2	Torino	Ascoli Piceno
15:00 CET (UTC+01:00)			Rosina 59' (pen.), 90+1'	Stadium: Stadio Cino e Lillo Del Duca; Attendance: 6,711; Referee: Matteo Trefoloni

20 December 2006 17	Torino	1–2	Roma	Turin
20:30 CET (UTC+01:00)	Rosina 88'		Totti 38'; Mancini 81'	Stadium: Stadio Olimpico di Torino; Attendance: 21,320; Referee: Gianluca Paparesta

23 December 2006 18	Livorno	1–1	Torino	Livorno
15:00 CET (UTC+01:00)	C. Lucarelli 61'		Cioffi 23'	Stadium: Stadio Armando Picchi; Attendance: 8,618; Referee: Andrea Gervasoni

13 January 2007 19	Torino	1–3	Internazionale	Turin
20:30 CET (UTC+01:00)	Fiore 58'		Adriano 24'; Ibrahimović 60'; Materazzi 85' (pen.)	Stadium: Stadio Olimpico di Torino; Attendance: 23,695; Referee: Massimiliano Saccani

21 January 2007 20	Parma	1–0	Torino	Parma
15:00 CET (UTC+01:00)	G. Rossi 75'			Stadium: Stadio Ennio Tardini; Attendance: 16,092; Referee: Paolo Mazzoleni

27 January 2007 21	Torino	2–3	Udinese	Turin
18:00 CET (UTC+01:00)	Abbruscato 77', 90+3'		Obodo 18'; Barreto 33'; Asamoah 61'	Stadium: Stadio Olimpico di Torino; Attendance: 18,987; Referee: Christian Brighi

11 February 2007 23	Torino	1–2	Reggina	Turin
15:00 CET (UTC+01:00)	Comotto 49'		R. Bianchi 48', 58'	Stadium: Stadio Olimpico di Torino; Attendance: 18,783; Referee: Gianluca Rocchi

18 February 2007 24	Lazio	2–0	Torino	Rome
15:00 CET (UTC+01:00)	Pandev 11', 60'			Stadium: Stadio Olimpico; Attendance: 16,852; Referee: Nicola Rizzoli

24 February 2007 25	Chievo	3–0	Torino	Verona
18:00 CET (UTC+01:00)	Bogdani 2', 45'; Brighi 47'			Stadium: Stadio Marcantonio Bentegodi; Attendance: 4,221; Referee: Massimiliano Saccani

28 February 2007 26	Torino	1–0	Cagliari	Turin
15:00 CET (UTC+01:00)	Bovo 23'			Stadium: Stadio Olimpico di Torino; Attendance: 19,378; Referee: Stefano Farina

4 March 2007 27	Fiorentina	5–1	Torino	Florence
15:00 CET (UTC+01:00)	Toni 31', 34'; I. Franceschini 52' (o.g.); Gamberini 74', 83'		Rosina 14'	Stadium: Stadio Artemio Franchi; Attendance: 23,900; Referee: Mauro Bergonzi

11 March 2007 28	Torino	1–0	Catania	Turin
15:00 CET (UTC+01:00)	Rosina 77'			Stadium: Stadio Olimpico di Torino; Attendance: 19,777; Referee: Gianluca Paparesta

18 March 2007 29	Messina	0–3	Torino	Messina
15:00 CET (UTC+01:00)			Muzzi 26'; Rosina 77' (pen.); Stellone 85'	Stadium: Stadio San Filippo; Attendance: 21,088; Referee: Paolo Bertini

1 April 2007 30	Torino	0–0	Palermo	Turin
15:00 CEST (UTC+02:00)				Stadium: Stadio Olimpico di Torino; Attendance: 20,932; Referee: Nicola Rizzoli

7 April 2007 31	Sampdoria	1–0	Torino	Genoa
15:00 CEST (UTC+02:00)	Bonazzoli 17'			Stadium: Stadio Luigi Ferraris; Attendance: 18,648; Referee: Oberdan Pantana

15 April 2007 32	Torino	1–2	Atalanta	Turin
15:00 CEST (UTC+02:00)	Abbruscato 70'		Bellini 1'; Zampagna 8'	Stadium: Stadio Olimpico di Torino; Attendance: 19,845; Referee: Gabriele Gava

18 April 2007 22	Siena	1–0	Torino	Siena
20:30 CEST (UTC+02:00)	Antonini 65'			Stadium: Stadio Artemio Franchi; Attendance: 5,958; Referee: Andrea Romeo

22 April 2007 33	Empoli	0–0	Torino	Empoli
15:00 CEST (UTC+02:00)				Stadium: Stadio Carlo Castellani; Attendance: 5,201; Referee: Paolo Dondarini

28 April 2007 34	Torino	0–1	Milan	Turin
18:00 CEST (UTC+02:00)			Seedorf 26'	Stadium: Stadio Olimpico di Torino; Attendance: 22,539; Referee: Domenico Messina

6 May 2007 35	Torino	1–0	Ascoli	Turin
15:00 CEST (UTC+02:00)	Rosina 18'			Stadium: Stadio Olimpico di Torino; Attendance: 20,048; Referee: Stefano Farina

13 May 2007 36	Roma	0–1	Torino	Rome
15:00 CEST (UTC+02:00)			Muzzi 14'	Stadium: Stadio Olimpico; Attendance: 31,518; Referee: Gianluca Rocchi

20 May 2007 37	Torino	0–0	Livorno	Turin
15:00 CEST (UTC+02:00)				Stadium: Stadio Olimpico di Torino; Attendance: 22,046; Referee: Massimiliano Saccani

27 May 2007 38	Internazionale	3–0	Torino	Milan
15:00 CEST (UTC+02:00)	Materazzi 12' (pen.); Maicon 60'; Figo 67' (pen.)			Stadium: San Siro; Attendance: 64,758; Referee: Daniele Orsato

=== Coppa Italia ===
19 August 2006 First round	Ivrea	0–3	Torino	Ivrea
20:30 CEST (UTC+02:00)			Abbruscato 30'; Rosina 58', 86'	Stadium: Stadio Gino Pistoni; Attendance: 3,500; Referee: Massimiliano Saccani

23 August 2006 Second round	Crotone	2–1	Torino	Crotone
20:30 CEST (UTC+02:00)	Giampaolo 69'; Sedivec 90'		Rosina 58'	Stadium: Stadio Ezio Scida; Attendance: 5,695; Referee: Andrea De Marco
