= Massimiliano Farris =

Italian football manager (born 1971)

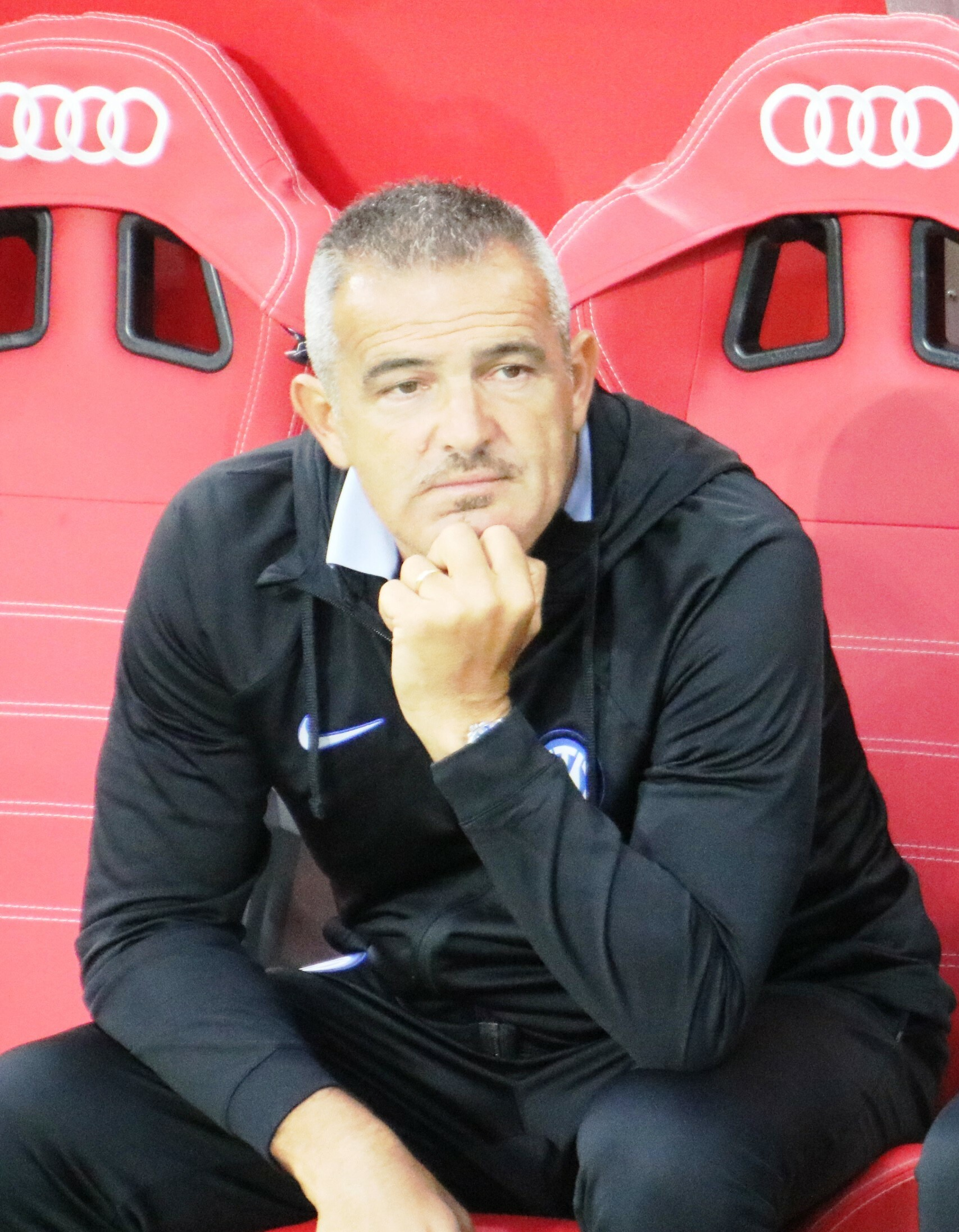
- Farris with Inter Milan in 2023

Personal information
- Full name: Massimiliano Farris
- Date of birth: 24 February 1971 (age 55)
- Place of birth: Milan, Italy
- Height: 1.82 m (6 ft 0 in)
- Position: Defender

Team information
- Current team: Al-Hilal (assistant coach)

Senior career*
Years	Team	Apps	(Gls)
1987–1988	Pro Vercelli	25	(0)
1988–1990	Torino	4	(0)
1990–1991	Barletta	19	(0)
1991–1993	Ternana	62	(3)
1993–1994	Pisa	30	(1)
1994–1996	Pescara	45	(2)
1996	Atletico Catania	6	(0)
1996–1998	Fiorenzuola	55	(1)
1998	Avellino	7	(0)
1999–2000	Atletico Catania	43	(5)
2000–2001	Lodigiani	29	(5)
2001–2002	Carrarese	26	(2)
2002	Imolese	16	(0)
2003	Nocerina	11	(0)
2003–2005	Sangiovannese	34	(2)
2005–2007	Viterbese	66	(10)
2007–2008	Bassano Romano	29	(1)
2008–2009	Flaminia C.C.	29	(0)

Managerial career
- 2009–2010: Flaminia C.C.
- 2010–2011: Pomezia
- 2011: Pomigliano
- 2012–2013: Viterbese
- 2013–2014: Sora
- 2014–2016: Lazio Primavera (assistant)
- 2016–2021: Lazio (assistant)
- 2021–2025: Inter Milan (assistant)
- 2025-: Al-Hilal (assistant)
- * Club domestic league appearances and goals

Massimiliano Farris (born 24 February 1971) is an Italian professional football coach and former player who is the assistant coach of Saudi Pro League club Al-Hilal FC.

With a career spanning over two decades, Farris played as a left-back for many different clubs. He began his professional career at Pro Vercelli and the following year moved to Torino where he made 4 appearances in Serie A. After a season at Barletta, he won the Serie C1 championship with Ternana and played in Serie B with Pisa and Pescara. Other clubs he played for after this were Atletico Catania, Fiorenzuola, Avellino, Lodigiani, Carrarese, Imolese, Nocerina, Sangiovannese, Viterbese, Bassano Romano and finally at Flaminia Civita Castellana where he retired in 2009.

Shortly after his retirement, Farris began his managerial career at Flaminia Civita Castellana in Serie D. Following spells with Pomezia and Pomigilano, he managed Viterbese and then Sora. He became assistant coach to Simone Inzaghi at Lazio in 2014 and moved with him to Inter Milan in 2021.

== Playing career ==
Farris made his professional debut at the age of 17 at Pro Vercelli, where he made 25 appearances in Serie C2.

The following year he was bought by Torino where he played the last 4 matches of the 1988–89 Serie A championship where Torino were relegated to Serie B.

In 1990, he moved to Barletta in Serie B and the next year he moved to Ternana, where he won the Serie C1 championship and played in Serie B the following season.

He then played three consecutive seasons in Serie B, with a season at Pisa with whom he was relegated and then the other two seasons at Pescara. In 1996, he moved back to Serie C1, for a few months at Atletico Catania and then at Fiorenzuola, where he remained for two seasons. In the following years he played for Avellino, again for Atletico Catania and also for Lodigiani from 2001 to 2002 where he scored 5 goals before being released at the season where he then stayed in Serie C1 by moving to Carrarese, where he made 26 appearances and scored 2 goals.

In 2002, at the age of 31, he moved to Serie C2 where he played for Imolese, Nocerina, Sangiovannese from 2003 to 2005 and then at Viterbese from 2005 to 2007. He spent his final seasons at Bassano Romano and then Flaminia C.C. before retiring in 2009.

Over his career, he made 4 appearances in Serie A and 126 appearances in Serie B.

== Coaching career ==
=== Early career ===
Farris began his coaching career at Flaminia Civita Castellana in Serie D where he was manager from 2009 to 2011. He became manager of Pomezia in 2010 in Serie C2 and left in 2011 when he became manager of Pomigilano in Serie D before resigning. He managed Viterbese from 2012 to 2013 in Serie D where he led them to a championship quarter final, ultimately losing 0–5 to Virtus Castelfranco in the fourth round on 26 May 2013. He then managed Sora from 2013 to 2014.

=== Lazio (assistant) ===
In the summer of 2014, Farris was contacted to become the assistant coach to Simone Inzaghi and following the dismissal of Stefano Pioli in 2016 they became responsible for the first team.

Until 2021, Farris had an undefeated record when substituting for Inzaghi. He secured a 2–0 win over Inter Milan on 1 May 2016, a 2–1 win against Atalanta on 15 January 2017, a 2–2 draw against Genoa on 15 April 2017, a 3–3 draw against Atalanta on 17 December 2017, a 4–3 win against Fiorentina on 18 April 2018, a 1–1 draw against A.C. Milan on 25 November 2018, a 1–1 draw against Inter Milan (later won on penalties) and a 2–1 win over Torino on 30 June 2020. Following Inzaghi testing positive for COVID-19 on 7 April 2021, Farris stood in for him for 3 matches until Inzaghi returned on 24 April. He led Lazio to a 1–0 victory with a stoppage time winner over Hellas Verona on 11 April. This was followed by a 5–3 win over Benevento on 18 April. Farris suffered his first defeat while substituting for Inzaghi with a 5–2 defeat to Napoli on 22 April.

Farris oversaw 314 games together with Inzaghi at Lazio.

=== Inter Milan (assistant) ===
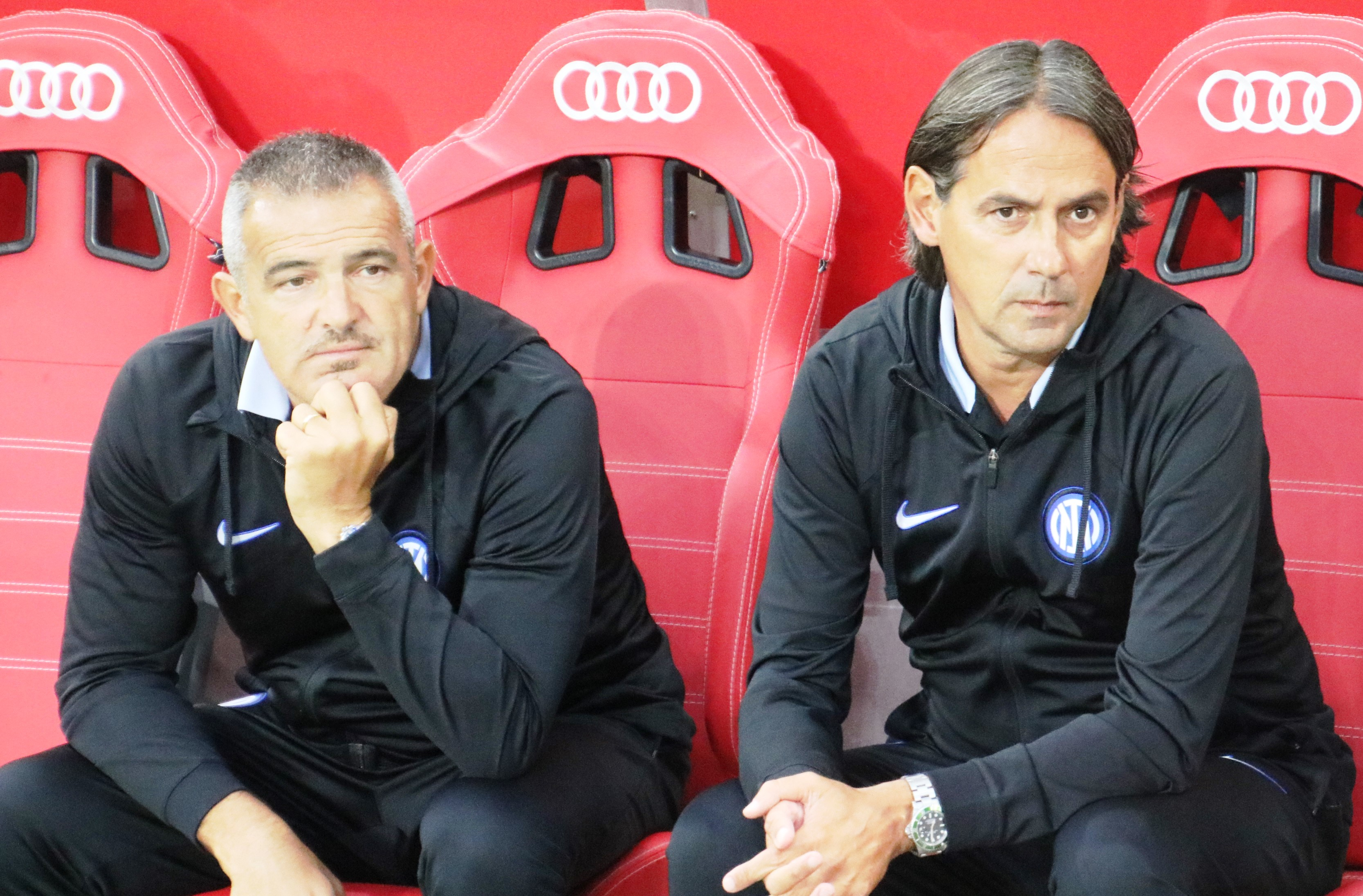
Farris and Simone Inzaghi with Inter Milan on 9 August 2023.

In May 2021, Farris moved along with Inzaghi to Inter Milan where he became the assistant coach. On 27 October of the same year, Farris stood in for Inzaghi in a 2–0 win over Empoli, following Inzaghi's suspension due to a red card.

On 12 February 2022, he stood in for Inzaghi in a 1–1 draw against Napoli and praised his team's mentality. On 26 October of the same year, he stood in for Inzaghi in a 4–0 Champions League victory over Viktoria Plzeň which secured Inter's place in the round of 16, following Inzaghi's suspension due to a red card.

On 10 February 2024, Farris stood in for Inzaghi in a 4–2 win over Roma at the Stadio Olimpico.

== Managerial profile ==
Farris has accredited Maurizio Sarri, his former manager at Sangiovannese from 2003 to 2005, as the reason for him getting into coaching and stated that Sarri used videos of your opponents' games and marked the minute where you made a mistake.

== Personal life ==
Farris is a supporter of Inter Milan. He and his wife have three daughters.

== Honours ==
=== Player ===
==== Ternana ====
- Serie C1 Championship: 1991–92

=== Assistant coach ===
Lazio

- Coppa Italia: 2018–19; runner-up: 2016–17
- Supercoppa Italiana: 2017, 2019

Inter Milan

- Serie A: 2023–24
- Coppa Italia: 2021–22, 2022–23
- Supercoppa Italiana: 2021, 2022, 2023
- UEFA Champions League runner-up: 2022–23
