= Roberto Stellone =

Italian football player and manager (born 1977)

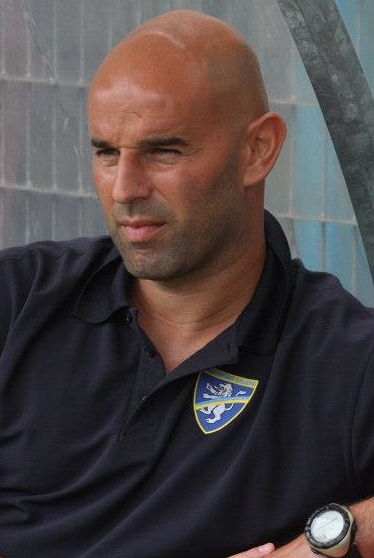
- Stellone in 2012

Personal information
- Date of birth: 22 July 1977 (age 49)
- Place of birth: Rome, Italy
- Height: 1.85 m (6 ft 1 in)
- Position: Forward

Youth career
- 1993–1995: Lodigiani

Senior career*
Years	Team	Apps	(Gls)
1993–1997	Lodigiani	50	(17)
1997–1998	Lucchese	12	(1)
1998–1999	Parma	0	(0)
1999	→ Lecce (loan)	19	(6)
1999–2003	Napoli	90	(30)
2003–2004	→ Reggina (loan)	16	(1)
2004–2005	Genoa	29	(18)
2005–2009	Torino	113	(16)
2009–2011	Frosinone	34	(6)
Total		363	(85)

Managerial career
- 2011–2012: Frosinone (Berretti team)
- 2012–2016: Frosinone
- 2016: Bari
- 2018: Palermo
- 2018–2019: Palermo
- 2020: Ascoli
- 2021: Arezzo
- 2022: Reggina
- 2023: Benevento
- 2024–2026: Vis Pesaro
- * Club domestic league appearances and goals

Roberto Stellone (born 22 July 1977) is an Italian football manager and former footballer who played as a forward.

== Club career ==
=== Early career ===
Son of former footballer Gaetano Stellone, Roberto Stellone started his career at hometown club Lodigiani, where he met David Di Michele, his team-mate at Reggina and Torino. After 4 seasons in Serie C1, he left for Lucchese of Serie B in mid-1997. In the summer of 1998, he left for Parma, but he had limited opportunities at the club and left for fellow Serie B side Lecce on loan in January 1999. He made a name for himself throughout the remainder of the season, scoring 6 goals in 19 league matches, helping the team win Serie A promotion and receiving a call-up to the Italy U21 team.

=== Napoli ===
In the summer of 1999, he left for Serie B side S.S.C. Napoli in a co-ownership deal. He added 10 more goals to his Serie B tally, which also helped Napoli win Serie A promotion after finishing the season in 4th place. At the end of the season, Napoli bought Stellone's remaining registration rights, keeping him at the club. However, despite scoring on his Serie A debut the following season, in a 2–1 home defeat to Juventus on 30 September 2000, Stellone's league appearances in his first Serie A season were limited to just three due to injury. As a result, Napoli were unable to avoid relegation. Stellone remained with Napoli in Serie B for the 2001–02 and 2002–03 seasons, scoring 19 goals in 51 matches, but missing out on several matches once again due to injury, however; in the summer of 2002, he was named the club's new captain. Facing financial difficulties, Napoli loaned Stellone to Serie A side Reggina during the 2003–04 season. Due to the presence of strikers David Di Michele and Emiliano Bonazzoli, Stellone struggled to find space in the team and scored only once in 16 league appearances.

The next season, he left for Serie B side Genoa, where he partnered with Diego Milito and Stephen Makinwa up-front and scored over 70% of the team's total goals. Although the team won the Serie B championship, the club was later penalised and awarded last place due to their involvement in the Caso Genoa, and as a result suffered relegation to Serie C.

=== Torino ===
Stellone was signed by Serie B runner-up Torino in co-ownership deal in August 2005, who were forced to remain at Serie B due to financial difficulty. Now partnered with Enrico Fantini and Roberto Muzzi in attack, Stellone failed to replicate his prolific performances at Geona, scoring seven goals in 31 appearances, but Torino still bought him outright, outbidding Genoa. Despite Stellone's struggle to find the back of the net consistently, Torino still managed to obtain Serie A promotion that season. With Torino in Serie A the following season, he alternated playing as a starter and as a substitute for the club. Although Stellone and the club's other strikers failed to score, with help of Alessandro Rosina and a solid defensive line, the team still managed to avoid Serie B relegation. The next season, with the signings of David Di Michele, Nicola Ventola and Álvaro Recoba, Stellone only made 18 starts, scoring just four goals. In his last season with the club, the 31-year-old forward faced competition from Rolando Bianchi and Nicola Amoruso; following the team's change of formation, which only used one striker, usually Bianchi, Stellone made half of his appearances as a substitute. With the departure of Alessandro Rosina in January 2009, the team struggled to score and ultimately failed to stay in Serie A on the final match-day of the season.

=== Frosinone ===
After the relegation of Torino in 2009, he became free agent in June. After months without a club, he signed a 3-year contract with Serie B club Frosinone in November 2009 where he was coached by Francesco Moriero. In the 2009–10 season his goals contributed to helping the team avoid relegation; following the club's relegation to Lega Pro the following year, on 28 June 2011, he announced his retirement from football.

== Style of play ==
A complete striker, Stellone could act either as a main striker or as a second striker, due to his vision, ability to score goals, hold up the ball in tight spaces, and create chances for team-mates. Despite his height and imposing physique, which enabled him to excel in the air, he was also known for his dynamism and technique; indeed, his main qualities a forward were his dribbling and heading ability.

== Managerial career ==
After his retirement, he stayed at Frosinone as a youth coach in charge of the under-19 team (Berretti) for the 2011–12 season. Under his tenure, the team won the national Berretti title.

=== Frosinone ===
Thanks also to his impressive results with the youth team, Stellone was appointed as Frosinone head coach role for the season 2012–13 in Lega Pro Prima Divisione. In his first season in charge, Stellone guided the team to seventh place and was confirmed for one more year.

In the 2013–14 Lega Pro Prima Divisione, Stellone's Frosinone immediately emerged as one of the promotion favourites, losing direct promotion only on the last matchday to Perugia. In the subsequent playoff tournament, however, Frosinone managed to achieve the ultimate goal of getting back into Serie B, defeating Salernitana in the first round, Pisa in the semi-finals and, most notably, a Fabrizio Miccoli-led Lecce in a two-legged final after extra time.

On 16 May 2015, he led Frosinone to second place in Serie B and direct promotion to Serie A with a game to spare, with victory against Crotone 3–1. On 7 March 2016, Stellone won the Panchina d’Argento for the previous 2014–15 season. On 8 May 2016, Frosinone were relegated back to Serie B after one season in Serie A. One day after Frosinone's last match of the Serie A season, on 15 May, Stellone was relieved of his managerial duties.

=== Bari ===
On 4 July 2016, Stellone was appointed manager of Bari. He was sacked on 7 November.

=== Palermo ===
Stellone was appointed manager of Serie B club Palermo on 28 April 2018, taking over from Bruno Tedino, with five games to go and the team in third place, level on points with second-placed Parma. He ended the season in fourth place, behind second-placed Parma and third-placed Frosinone.

After defeating Venezia in the semi-finals, Palermo was defeated 2–3 on aggregate by Frosinone in a two-legged final. This marked the end of Stellone's tenure, as he was not confirmed for the new season, with Tedino reappointed as head coach.

On 26 September 2018, he was reinstated as Palermo head following a 1–2 loss to Brescia on the fifth matchday of the season. Stellone started his second tenure in an awe-inspiring fashion, as he successfully led Palermo to a streak of positive results that brought the Rosanero back on top of the league table by December. He was sacked on 23 April 2019.

=== Ascoli ===
Stellone was appointed manager of Ascoli on 3 February 2020. He was sacked on 16 April 2020.

=== Arezzo ===
On 18 January 2021 he was hired by Serie C club Arezzo in place of Andrea Camplone. Arezzo was relegated to Serie D at the end of the season, and Stellone left the club.

=== Reggina ===
On 24 January 2022, Stellone was named the new manager of Serie B club Reggina, thus becoming the third manager of the season for the Calabrians. He guided Reggina safely above the relegation zone with a 14th place finish in Serie B. His contract was not renewed following the sale of the club.

=== Benevento ===
On 6 February 2023, Stellone was appointed head coach of struggling Serie B club Benevento, replacing Fabio Cannavaro.

=== Vis Pesaro ===
On 31 March 2024, Stellone was hired as the new head coach of relegation-threatened Serie C club Vis Pesaro, signing a contract until 30 June 2026.

== Career statistics ==
Appearances and goals by club, season and competition
Season	Club	League		
Season	Club	Division	Apps.	Goals
Lodigiani	1993–94	Serie C1	1	0
Lodigiani	1994–95	Serie C1	0	0
Lodigiani	1995–96	Serie C1	18	1
Lodigiani	1996–97	Serie C1	31	16
Lucchese	1997–98	Serie B	12	1
Parma	1998–99	Serie A	0	0
Lecce	1998–99	Serie B	19	6
Napoli	1999–2000	Serie B	36	10
Napoli	2000–01	Serie A	3	1
Napoli	2001–02	Serie B	24	11
Napoli	2002–03	Serie B	27	8
Reggina	2003–04	Serie A	16	1
Genoa	2004–05	Serie B	29	18
Torino	2005–06	Serie B	31	7
Torino	2006–07	Serie A	32	4
Torino	2007–08	Serie A	21	3
Torino	2008–09	Serie A	29	2
Frosinone	2009–10	Serie B	14	4
Frosinone	2010–11	Serie B	20	2

== Managerial statistics ==
As of match played 10 April 2023

Managerial record by team and tenure
Team	From	To	Record							
Team	From	To	G	W	D	L	GF	GA	GD	Win %
Frosinone	14 June 2012	15 May 2016	160	65	43	52	208	193	+15	40.63
Bari	4 July 2016	7 November 2016	15	5	4	6	14	16	−2	33.33
Palermo	28 April 2018	9 July 2018	8	4	3	1	10	7	+3	50.00
Palermo	26 September 2018	23 April 2019	27	13	10	4	40	25	+15	48.15
Ascoli	2 February 2020	16 April 2020	5	0	2	3	5	11	−6	0.00
Arezzo	18 January 2021	3 May 2021	19	4	7	8	21	28	−7	21.05
Reggina	24 January 2022	30 June 2022	18	7	4	7	15	22	−7	38.89
Benevento	6 February 2023	10 April 2023	9	1	3	5	4	12	−8	11.11
Total			261	99	76	86	317	314	+3	37.93

== Honours ==
Individual

- Panchina d'Oro Lega Pro: 2013–14 Lega Pro
- Panchina d’Argento: 2014–15
