= Jacopo Sciamanna =

Italian footballer

Personal information
- Full name: Jacopo Sciamanna
- Date of birth: 24 May 1990 (age 36)
- Place of birth: Viterbo, Italy
- Height: 1.80 m (5 ft 11 in)
- Position: Striker

Team information
- Current team: Monterosi

Youth career
- Lazio

Senior career*
Years	Team	Apps	(Gls)
2009–2011	Lazio	0	(0)
2010–2011	→ San Marino (loan)	7	(0)
2011–1012	Celano	31	(7)
2012–2013	Flaminia	25	(10)
2013	Ostia Mare	6	(0)
2013–2015	Flaminia	48	(24)
2015	Campobasso	1	(0)
2015	Lavagnese	6	(1)
2015–2016	Gubbio	11	(2)
2016–2017	Correggese	31	(23)
2017–2018	Reggina	12	(4)
2018–2019	Cavese	17	(5)
2019–	Monterosi	0	(0)
- * Club domestic league appearances and goals as of 20 January 2019

Jacopo Sciamanna (born 24 May 1990) is an Italian footballer who currently plays as a striker for Monterosi.

== Club career ==
Having come through the youth system of Lazio, Sciamanna was sent on loan to San Marino Calcio in 2010 without having played a senior game for his parent club.

On 24 August 2018, he joined Cavese.

On 13 July 2019 he signed with Serie D side Monterosi.
