= Alessandro Sgrigna =

Italian footballer (born 1980)

Personal information
- Date of birth: 24 April 1980 (age 46)
- Place of birth: Rome, Italy
- Height: 1.79 m (5 ft 10 1/2 in)
- Position: Second striker

Youth career
- Lodigiani

Senior career*
Years	Team	Apps	(Gls)
1995–1997	Lodigiani	15	(2)
1997–1999	Internazionale	0	(0)
1998–1999	→ Lodigiani (loan)	31	(8)
1999–2003	Vicenza	29	(1)
2000–2001	→ Pistoiese (loan)	5	(0)
2001	→ Reggiana (loan)	10	(0)
2003–2005	Cittadella	65	(25)
2005–2007	Vicenza	46	(4)
2007	→ Bari (loan)	20	(4)
2007–2008	Triestina	35	(7)
2008–2010	Vicenza	73	(22)
2010–2012	Torino	76	(14)
2013–2014	Verona	17	(3)
2013–2014	→ Carpi (loan)	33	(5)
2014–2016	Cittadella	56	(9)
2016–	Leodari Vicenza	0	(0)

International career
1995	Italy U16	1	(0)
1998	Italy U17	1	(0)
1997–1999	Italy U18	15	(7)
- * Club domestic league appearances and goals as of 25 September 2016

Alessandro Sgrigna (born 24 April 1980) is an Italian former football forward who last played for Leodari Vicenza.

== Club career ==
Sgrigna started his career at Rome for Lodigiani. He played for Internazionale youth team before back to Rome.

=== Vicenza ===
He then signed by Vicenza in mid of 1999. He also co-owned with Verona from 1999 to 2002. He played 3 league matches before loaned out in 2000–01 season, which he stayed from June to October 2000. . Returned to Vicenza in 2001, he started to play regularly, collected 24 league appearances but in next season just played twice in 2002–03 Serie B until left the club in January 2003.

=== Cittadella ===
Sgrigna was loaned to Cittadella of 2002–03 Serie C1 in mid of the season. He was signed in another co-ownership deal along with Stefano Mazzocco at the start of 2003–04 season, played another 57 league matches for Cittadella. In June 2005, Vicenza won the blind auction against Cittadella for the player.

=== Vicenza (2) ===
Sgrigna made 33 appearances and 4 goals in 2005–06 Serie B. After he scored nil in 2006–07 season, Sgrigna was loaned to Bari of the same league.

=== Triestina ===
In July 2007 he went on loan to Triestina, for €100,000, also from Serie B, coached by Rolando Maran, the same coach at Bari. Triestina bought him in co-ownership deal (exchanged with Emiliano Testini, both tagged for €900,000) in January 2008 but in June Vicenza bought back Sgrigna again, for €500,000 (while Testini was tagged for €480,000).

=== Torino ===
In August 2010 he was exchanged with Elvis Abbruscato. Sgrigna was valued €1.32 million and Abbruscato for €1.2 million.

== International career ==
Sgrigna has been capped for the Italian U16, U17, and U18 teams. He played at 1999 UEFA European Under-18 Football Championship that lost to Portugal in the final.
