= 2006–07 AC Mantova season =

Mantova
2006–07 season
- Chairman: Fabrizio Lori
- Manager: Domenico Di Carlo
- Stadium: Stadio Danilo Martelli
- Serie B: 8th
- Coppa Italia: Second round
- Top goalscorer: League: Gaetano Caridi (11); All: Gaetano Caridi (11)
- Average home league attendance: 8,604
- Biggest win: Mantova 4–0 Lecce
- Biggest defeat: Lecce 2–0 Mantova; Mantova 0–2 Bologna; Mantova 0–2 Hellas Verona; Juventus 2–0 Mantova

The 2006–07 A.C. Mantova season was the club's 96th season in existence and the club's second consecutive in the second division of Italian football. In addition to the domestic league, Mantova participated in this season's edition of the Coppa Italia.

== Competitions ==
=== Overview ===
Competition	First match	Last match	Starting round	Final position	Record							
Competition	First match	Last match	Starting round	Final position	Pld	W	D	L	GF	GA	GD	Win %
Serie B	8 September 2006	10 June 2007	Matchday 1	8th	42	15	19	8	47	36	+11	35.71
Coppa Italia	19 August 2006	23 August 2006	First round	Second round	2	1	1	0	3	2	+1	50.00
Total					44	16	20	8	50	38	+12	36.36

Source: Competitions

=== Serie B ===
==== League table ====
Pos	Team	Pld	W	D	L	GF	GA	GD	Pts
6	Brescia	42	19	10	13	51	43	+8	67 (Note: RIM 2–0 BRE; BRE 0–2 RIM)
7	Bologna	42	18	11	13	52	43	+9	65
8	Mantova	42	15	19	8	47	36	+11	64
9	Lecce	42	17	7	18	56	53	+3	58
10	AlbinoLeffe	42	11	20	11	46	48	−2	53

Source: Almanacco Illustrato del Calcio 2008 (in Italian). Panini Edizioni. November 2007.
Rules for classification: 1) points; 2) head-to-head points; 3) head-to-head goal difference; 4) head-to-head goals scored; 5) goal difference; 6) number of goals scored

==== Results summary ====
Overall								Home						Away					
Pld	W	D	L	GF	GA	GD	Pts	W	D	L	GF	GA	GD	W	D	L	GF	GA	GD
42	15	19	8	47	36	+11	64	12	7	2	27	13	+14	3	12	6	20	23	−3

==== Results by round ====
Round	1	2	3	4	5	6	7	8	9	10	11	12	13	14	15	16	17	18	19	20	21	22	23	24	25	26	27	28	29	30	31	32	33	34	35	36	37	38	39	40	41	42
Ground	A	H	A	H	A	H	A	H	A	H	A	H	A	H	H	A	H	A	H	A	H	H	A	H	A	H	A	H	A	H	A	H	A	H	A	A	H	A	H	A	H	A
Result	D	W	L	W	D	W	D	L	D	W	D	W	D	D	D	D	W	W	W	L	W	D	D	W	L	D	D	D	D	D	D	W	W	D	W	L	W	D	L	L	W	L
Position	9	6	13	6	7	2	2	9	11	6	9	7	8	9	8	9	7	7	5	7	4	5	6	4	4	5	6	6	7	7	7	7	6	5	5	5	5	4	5	6	6	8

A = Away; H = Home; W = Win; D = Draw; L = Loss

==== Matches ====
8 September 2006 1	Arezzo	1–1	Mantova

16 September 2006 2	Mantova	2–1	Pescara

19 September 2006 3	Lecce	2–0	Mantova

23 September 2006 4	Mantova	3–0	Crotone

2 October 2006 5	Triestina	0–0	Mantova

8 October 2006 6	Mantova	2–0	Vicenza

14 October 2006 7	Spezia	1–1	Mantova

21 October 2006 8	Mantova	0–2	Bologna

28 October 2006 9	Treviso	1–1	Mantova

4 November 2006 10	Mantova	4–3	Cesena

11 November 2006 11	Brescia	0–0	Mantova

20 November 2006 12	Mantova	1–0	Piacenza

27 November 2006 13	Frosinone	1–1	Mantova

2 December 2006 14	Mantova	0–0	Bari

9 December 2006 15	Mantova	0–0	AlbinoLeffe

16 December 2006 16	Napoli	0–0	Mantova

19 December 2006 17	Mantova	1–0	Modena

23 December 2006 18	Hellas Verona	0–3	Mantova

13 January 2007 19	Mantova	1–0	Juventus

19 January 2007 20	Genoa	2–1	Mantova

27 January 2007 21	Mantova	2–1	Rimini

10 February 2007 23	Pescara	0–0	Mantova

17 February 2007 24	Mantova	4–0	Lecce

24 February 2007 25	Crotone	2–1	Mantova

5 March 2007 26	Mantova	1–1	Triestina

10 March 2007 27	Vicenza	0–0	Mantova

13 March 2007 28	Mantova	0–0	Spezia

16 March 2007 29	Bologna	1–1	Mantova

25 March 2007 31	Cesena	1–1	Mantova

31 March 2007 32	Mantova	2–1	Brescia

7 April 2007 33	Piacenza	3–4	Mantova

14 April 2007 34	Mantova	1–1	Frosinone

17 April 2007 22	Mantova	1–1	Arezzo

23 April 2007 35	Bari	0–1	Mantova

28 April 2007 36	AlbinoLeffe	2–1	Mantova

1 May 2007 30	Mantova	0–0	Treviso

5 May 2007 37	Mantova	1–0	Napoli

12 May 2007 38	Modena	2–2	Mantova

19 May 2007 39	Mantova	0–2	Hellas Verona

26 May 2007 40	Juventus	2–0	Mantova

3 June 2007 41	Mantova	1–0	Genoa

1 June 2007 42	Rimini	2–1	Mantova

=== Coppa Italia ===
19 August 2006 First round	Novara	1–2	Mantova

23 August 2006 Second round	Mantova	1–1 (3–4 p)	Modena
