= 2001–02 SSC Napoli season =

Napoli
2001–02 season
- Chairman: Giorgio Corbelli
- Manager: Luigi De Canio
- Serie B: 5th
- Coppa Italia: Second Round
- Top goalscorer: League: Roberto Stellone (11); All: Roberto Stellone (13)
- Average home league attendance: 17,386
Home colours	Away colours	Third colours

SSC Napoli spent the 2001–02 season in Serie B, which had been assured following sensational events in the final Serie A round the season before, when all bottom teams won their matches. In 2002, Napoli came fairly close to promotion, but stumbled due to a 2–1 defeat to Siena at the end of the campaign. With Empoli rounding off their campaign with a victory, not even a win could have helped Napoli to have a chance, and with the team also losing the final game of the season, Luigi De Canio stepped down as coach.

== Squad ==
=== Goalkeepers ===
- (Italy) Marco Roccati
- (Italy) Raffaele Gragnaniello
- (Italy) Francesco Mancini

=== Defenders ===
- (Italy) Dario Baccin
- (Italy) Antonio Bocchetti
- (Italy) Mauro Bonomi
- (Italy) Ciro Caruso
- (Argentina) Esteban López
- (Italy) Gianluca Luppi
- (Italy) Marco Quadrini
- (Morocco) Abdelilah Saber
- (Italy) Emanuele Troise
- (Italy) Matteo Villa

=== Midfielders ===
- (Italy) Giuseppe Alessi
- (Italy) Raffaele Ametrano
- (Italy) Emiliano Bigica
- (Italy) Domenico Cristiano
- (Czech Republic) Marek Jankulovski
- (Italy) Oscar Magoni
- (Brazil) Montezine
- (Italy) Francesco Moriero
- (Portugal) José Luís Vidigal

=== Attackers ===
- (Italy) Antonio Floro Flores
- (Italy) Roberto Stellone
- (Italy) Mattia Graffiedi
- (Honduras) Carlos Pavón
- (Italy) Massimo Rastelli
- (Italy) Edoardo Artistico
- (Switzerland) (Italy) David Sesa

== Serie B ==
Pos	Team	Pld	W	D	L	GF	GA	GD	Pts	Promotion or relegation
3	Reggina (P)	38	19	11	8	50	33	+17	68	Promotion to Serie A
4	Empoli (P)	38	19	10	9	60	35	+25	67	Promotion to Serie A
5	Napoli	38	16	13	9	48	39	+9	61	
6	Bari	38	14	11	13	44	51	−7	53	
7	Salernitana	38	14	11	13	57	59	−2	53	

Source: Almanacco Illustrato del Calcio - La Storia 1898-2004, Panini Edizioni, Modena, September 2005
Rules for classification: 1) points; 2) head-to-head points; 3) head-to-head goal difference; 4) head-to-head goals scored; 5) goal difference; 6) number of goals scored.
(P) Promoted

=== Matches ===
1	Genoa	0–2	Napoli
			Stellone 61, 85'

2	Napoli	1–2	Ancona
	Stellone 45'		Parente 17'; Vieri 50'

3	Modena	4–1	Napoli
	Fabbrini 24, 37, 53'; Grieco 86'		Rastelli 35'

4	Napoli	0–0	Vicenza

5	Empoli	1–0	Napoli
	Cappellini 83'

6	Napoli	0–0	Cagliari

7	Ternana	1–2	Napoli
	Miccoli 33'		Bocchetti 57'; Montezine 62'

8	Napoli	1–1	Salernitana
	Villa 18'		Lázzaro 90 + 3'

9	Cittadella	1–2	Napoli
	Ghirardello 83' (pen.)		Baccin 43'; Graffiedi 89'

10	Napoli	1–1	Sampdoria
	Montezine 76'		Jovičić 37'

11	Bari	0–1	Napoli
			Magoni 41'

12	Napoli	0–0	Crotone

13	Messina	2–1	Napoli
	Godeas 40, 79'		Montezine 59'

14	Reggina	3–1	Napoli
	Savoldi 45 + 3, 68'; Jiránek 51'		Stellone 90'

15	Napoli	3–2	Palermo
	Vidigal 9'; Stellone 46, 71'		Guidoni 4'; Amerini 11'

16	Napoli	4–2	Cosenza
	Stellone 15, 42'; Montezine 47'; Jankulovski 90 + 2'		Zaniolo 5'; Imbriani 66'

17	Pistoiese	1–1	Napoli
	Banchelli 3'		Jankulovski 26'

18	Napoli	2–0	Siena
	Rastelli 42, 63'

19	Como	0–2	Napoli
			Magoni 6'; Stellone 51'

20	Napoli	2–1	Genoa
	Bonomi 31'; Graffiedi 85'		Magoni 9' (o.g.)

21	Ancona	0–1	Napoli
			Luppi 37'

22	Napoli	1–0	Modena
	Sesa 8'

23	Vicenza	2–1	Napoli
	Schwoch 27'; Maggio 35'		Magoni 23'

24	Napoli	0–0	Empoli

25	Cagliari	1–1	Napoli
	Cammarata 58'		Jankulovski 37'

26	Napoli	1–1	Ternana
	Artistico 45 + 3' (pen.)		Fabris 90 + 1'

27	Salernitana	3–1	Napoli
	Vignaroli 4'; Tedesco 39'; Bellotto 73'		Stellone 63'

28	Napoli	1–1	Cittadella
	Stellone 1'		Ghirardello 9'

29	Sampdoria	0–2	Napoli
			Vidigal 41'; Rastelli 69'

30	Napoli	1–0	Bari
	Luppi 71' (pen.)

31	Crotone	1–2	Napoli
	Deflorio 24'		Luppi 44'; Graffiedi 48'

32	Napoli	1–0	Messina
	Luppi 20'

33	Napoli	1–1	Reggina
	Vidigal 41'		Savoldi 4'

34	Palermo	1–1	Napoli
	Guidoni 69'		Jankulovski 37'

35	Cosenza	1–1	Napoli
	Giampaolo 21'		Bonomi 66'

36	Napoli	3–1	Pistoiese
	Villa 28'; Rastelli 71, 90'		Bellini 47'

37	Siena	2–1	Napoli
	Pinga 3'; Zampagna 81' (pen.)		Jankulovski 69' (pen.)

38	Napoli	1–2	Como
	Montezine 1'		Allegretti 18'; Taldo 23'
