= Roberto Morinini =

Swiss footballer and manager (1951–2012)

Personal information
- Date of birth: 18 July 1951
- Place of birth: Bellinzona, Switzerland
- Date of death: 16 March 2012 (aged 60)
- Position: Forward

Senior career*
Years	Team	Apps	(Gls)
1969–1970	Neuchâtel Xamax		
1970–1978	AC Bellinzona		
1978–1981	FC Locarno		

Managerial career
- 1983–1984: AC Bellinzona
- 1984–1988: CS Chênois
- 1988–1993: FC Locarno
- 1993–1994: FC Monthey
- 1995–1996: FC Lugano
- 1996–1997: Atletico Catania
- 1997–1998: Avellino
- 1998–1999: Fidelis Andria
- 2000–2002: FC Lugano
- 2002–2003: Servette FC
- 2004: Angers SCO
- 2005–2006: Yverdon Sport FC
- 2008: FC Luzern
- 2010–2011: AC Bellinzona
- 2011: FC Lugano
- * Club domestic league appearances and goals

Roberto Morinini (18 July 1951 – 16 March 2012) was a Swiss football striker and later manager.
