= Claudio Ferrarese =

Italian footballer (born 1978)

Personal information
- Date of birth: 7 September 1978 (age 48)
- Place of birth: Verona, Italy
- Height: 1.74 m (5 ft 8 1/2 in)
- Position: Midfielder

Youth career
- Virtus Verona
- Hellas Verona

Senior career*
Years	Team	Apps	(Gls)
1995–2000	Hellas Verona	36	(2)
1999–2000	→ Pistoiese (loan)	34	(3)
2001–2003	Cittadella	45	(4)
2002–2003	→ Napoli (loan)	14	(0)
2003	→ Piacenza (loan)	18	(2)
2003–2004	Ternana	38	(0)
2004–2005	Salernitana	35	(4)
2005–2006	Cagliari	3	(0)
2006–2007	Torino	16	(1)
2007–2008	Verona	35	(1)
2008–2009	Cremonese	26	(0)
2009–2011	Spezia	21	(1)
2011–2012	Trento	14	(1)
2012–2013	Sambonifacese	19	(2)
2013–2014	Fersina–Perginese	10	(2)
2014–2015	Virtus Verona	19	(0)
2015–2017	Trento	?	(20)

International career
1996	Italy U18	4	(3)
1996	Italy U19	5	(0)
- * Club domestic league appearances and goals

Claudio Ferrarese (born 7 September 1978) is a retired Italian footballer.

== Biography ==
Born in Verona, Veneto, Ferrarese started his professional career at Hellas Verona F.C. Ferrarese also played for Virtus Verona before he was signed by Hellas. In January 2001 he left for fellow Veneto club AS Cittadella–Padova in co-ownership deal for 2,000 million Italian lire (€1,032,914). Cittadella relegated to Serie C1 in 2002. In June 2002 the club also acquired Ferrarese outright from Verona. Ferrarese was a player for S.S.C. Napoli in Serie B and Piacenza in Serie A (swap with Dario Marcolin) in 2002–03 season. In July 2003 Ferrarese was signed by Ternana. In July 2004 Ferrarese, Alex Brunner and Christian Terni were signed by Salernitana. On 22 August 2005 Ferrarese moved to Cagliari. However, on 2 January 2006 Ferrarese left for Torino F.C. Torino finally promoted to Serie A in 2006. The club forced to stay in 2005–06 Serie B due to financial difficulties. Ferrarese only played once in 2006–07 Serie A. On 4 January 2007 Ferrarese returned to Verona. Ferrarese was a regular starter in 2006–07 Serie B. Verona relegated to Serie C1 in 2007. On 4 January 2008 Ferrarese moved again, this time to fellow third division club Cremonese. Ferrarese's contract was terminated in mutual consent on 26 June 2009. After without a club for 4 months, he was signed by Spezia of the fourth division. However, due to the termination was documented to Lega Calcio after 1 July, his availability was delayed to winter transfer windows. Ferrarese made his debut in January 2010. In June his contract was renewed.

Since 2012 Ferrarese was a player of Serie D clubs. He also won promotion to Serie D from Eccellenza for Trento in 2012.

=== International career ===
Ferrarese played twice in 1997 UEFA European Under-18 Championship qualification. (now renamed to U19 event)
