= Enrico Fantini =

Italian footballer (born 1976)

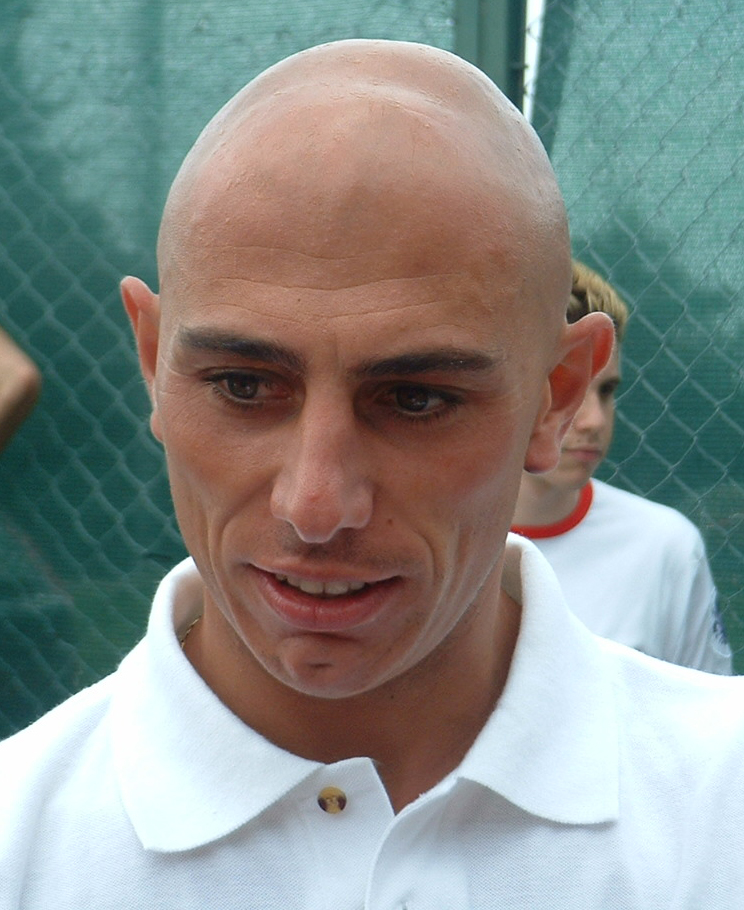
- Fantini in 2005

Personal information
- Date of birth: 27 February 1976 (age 50)
- Place of birth: Cuneo, Italy
- Height: 1.83 m (6 ft 0 in)
- Position: Forward

Team information
- Current team: Cuneo

Youth career
- 1987–1989: Cuneo
- 1989–1994: Juventus

Senior career*
Years	Team	Apps	(Gls)
1995–1996	Juventus	1	(0)
1995–1996	→ Cremonese (loan)	20	(1)
1996–2000	Venezia	17	(1)
1997–1998	→ Alessandria (loan)	33	(10)
1998–1999	→ Livorno (loan)	31	(7)
1999–2000	→ Cittadella (loan)	20	(5)
2000	→ Chievo (loan)	14	(2)
2000–2002	Chievo	26	(1)
2001–2002	→ Modena (loan)	18	(2)
2002–2004	Venezia	53	(11)
2004–2006	Fiorentina	48	(2)
2005–2006	→ Torino (loan)	38	(9)
2006–2007	Bologna	19	(2)
2007–2009	Modena	41	(3)
2009–2010	Alessandria	32	(3)
2010–2013	Cuneo	79	(45)
2013–	Savona	9	(0)
- * Club domestic league appearances and goals

Enrico Fantini (born 27 February 1976) is a former Italian footballer who played as a forward for Cuneo.

== Career ==
Born in Cuneo, Piedmont, Fantini started his professional career with Piedmontese club Juventus FC.

=== Venezia ===
In 1996 Fantini left for Venezia in co-ownership deal for 75 million lire (€38,734) In June 2000 Venezia acquired Fantini outright for 200 million lire, 125 million lire more than the original valuation.

In the summer 2000, Fantini was sold to A.C. ChievoVerona, where he spent the second half of the 1999–2000 Serie B season. Fantini finished third with Chievo in 2000–01 Serie B. He was out of Chievo's Serie A plans and loaned to Modena. In June 2002 Fantini returned to Venezia again. Fantini played for the league struggler until January 2004. Former Venezia owner Maurizio Zamparini brought most of the star players of the team out of the Lagunari in July 2002.

=== Fiorentina & Torino ===
Fantini won promotion to Serie A with Fiorentina in 2004. In 2005 Fantini left for newly-formed Torino FC of Serie B, which previous entity was bankrupted, and missed the Serie A promotion. He won promotion again at the end of 2005–06 Serie B. He was sold to Bologna F.C. 1909 for €500,000

=== Bologna & Modena ===
Fantini then spent 3 more seasons in two difference Serie B from 2006 to 2009.

=== Return to Piedmont ===
He returned to the region of Piedmont for Alessandria in 2009 after terminating his contract with Modena. In 2010, he returned to his hometown club Cuneo where he scored 31 goals in 32 games in 2010–11 Serie D season.

== Honours ==
Fiorentina

- Serie B Promotion Playoffs: 2003–04

Torino

- Serie B Promotion Playoffs: 2005–06

Cuneo

- Scudetto Dilettanti Group A winner: 2011
