= Claudio de Sousa =

Italian footballer (born 1985)

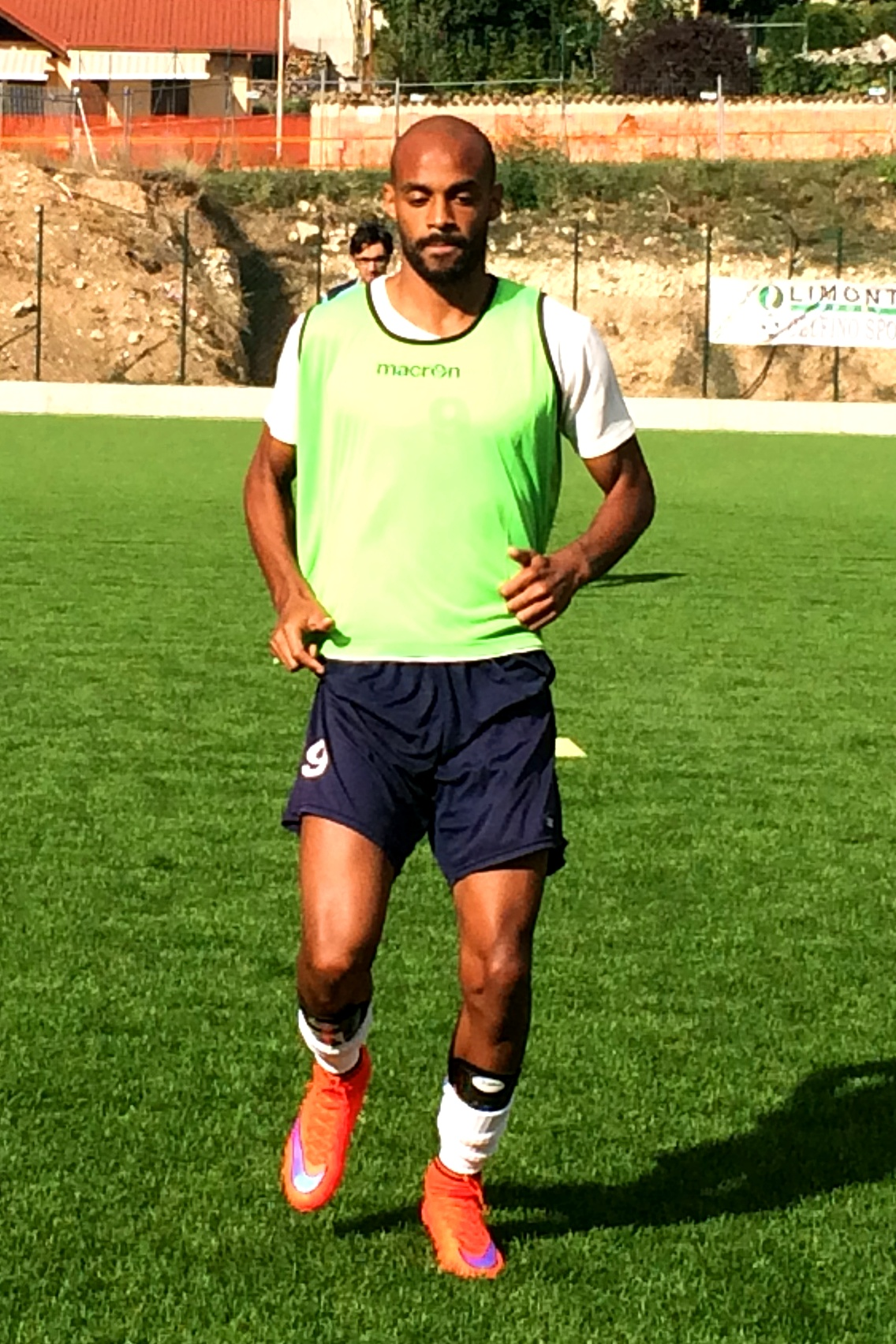

Personal information
- Date of birth: 10 August 1985 (age 41)
- Place of birth: Rome, Italy
- Height: 1.82 m (6 ft 0 in)
- Position: Forward

Team information
- Current team: Ostia Mare

Youth career
- Lodigiani

Senior career*
Years	Team	Apps	(Gls)
2001–2004	Lodigiani	30	(1)
2004–2005	Lazio	4	(1)
2005–2007	Torino	11	(1)
2006	→ Catanzaro (loan)	14	(2)
2007–2008	Ancona	25	(3)
2008–2009	Pescara	1	(0)
2010–2011	Murata	28	(19)
2012–2013	Chieti	32	(18)
2013–2016	L'Aquila	66	(14)
2014–2015	→ Como (loan)	32	(3)
2016–2017	Racing Roma	36	(17)
2017–2018	Racing Fondi	17	(1)
2018	→ Viterbese (loan)	15	(1)
2019	Aprilia	15	(4)
2019–	Ostia Mare	0	(0)
- * Club domestic league appearances and goals as of 00:15, 19 July 2019 (UTC)

Claudio de Sousa (born 10 August 1985) is an Italian footballer who currently plays as a forward for Ostia Mare.

== Career ==
Born in Rome to Angolan father and Italian mother, De Sousa made his Serie A debut with Lazio in 2005 and was then signed by Messina. Later that year, he was sold to Torino in co-ownership deal. He then spent time on loan at Catanzaro and then left for Ancona.

After an unsuccessful short stint at Pescara, De Sousa was released from his contract in July 2009.

In January 2011, De Sousa moved to San Marino, where he signed for Murata. His career was rejuvenated there and scored a total 19 goals in 28 games for the club. In July 2012, he joined Lega Pro Seconda Divisione club Chieti after a trial period.

=== L'Aquila and Como ===
In summer 2013 he was signed by L'Aquila. On 31 August 2014 he was signed by Como in a temporary deal. The following year returns to play in the L'Aquila.

=== Racing Club Roma ===
Since the summer of 2016 playing for Racing Club Roma.

=== Racing Aprilia ===
On 27 December 2018, de Sousa signed with Aprilia.

=== Ostia Mare ===
De Sousa joined Serie D club Ostia Mare ahead of the 2019/20 season. The deal was confirmed on 29 June 2019.
