= Emiliano Salvetti =

Italian footballer (born 1974)

Personal information
- Date of birth: 1 January 1974 (age 52)
- Place of birth: Forlì, Italy
- Height: 1.80 m (5 ft 11 in)
- Position: Attacking midfielder

Youth career
- 1992–1993: Cesena

Senior career*
Years	Team	Apps	(Gls)
1993–1994	Cesena	21	(1)
1994–1995	Forlì	26	(1)
1995	Spal	4	(0)
1996	Forlì	19	(7)
1996–1999	Cesena	92	(14)
1999–2004	Verona	101	(16)
2002–2003	→ Bologna (loan)	7	(0)
2004–2008	Cesena	58	(20)
2008–2011	Sassuolo	66	(9)
- * Club domestic league appearances and goals

Emiliano Salvetti (born 1 January 1974) is an Italian former footballer who played as a midfielder.

He is best known for his time as a Cesena mainstay from 1996 to 1999, and again from 2004 to 2008. He scored 18 goals for the club during the 2005–06 Serie B season, one of the team's records for a midfielder. In June 2008, following Cesena's relegation to Serie C1, he accepted an offer from Sassuolo in order to keep playing in the league.
