= Tommaso Vailatti =

Italian footballer (born 1986)

Personal information
- Full name: Tommaso Vailatti
- Date of birth: 1 February 1986 (age 40)
- Place of birth: Venaria, Italy
- Height: 1.83 m (6 ft 0 in)
- Position: Midfielder

Team information
- Current team: Ternana

Youth career
- 1992–2004: Torino

Senior career*
Years	Team	Apps	(Gls)
2004–	Torino	37	(3)
2006–2007	→ Vicenza (loan)	20	(0)
2008	→ Livorno (loan)	4	(0)
2009	Torino		
2010	Ternana		

International career
2004	Italy Under-18	1	(0)
- * Club domestic league appearances and goals as of 11 May 2008 18:15 (UTC)

Tommaso Vailatti (born 1 February 1986 in Venaria Reale, Piedmont) is an Italian footballer who plays for Ternana Calcio.

== Club career ==
Nicknamed "Riki", he joined Torino's youth system at the age of 16. He began his professional career in Serie B while playing for Torino. In his first season with the club he made ten scoreless appearances. His second season saw him make 13 appearances and score his first professional goal against Cremonese. In 2006, he received the Tuttomercatoweb Cercasi Calciatore Disperatamente award which recognizes the best young football player in Italy.

When Torino was promoted to Serie A, he was loaned out to Vicenza during the 2006-07 season where he played in twenty games but scored no goals. For the 2007-08 season, he was brought back to Torino, where on 25 August 2007, in his Serie A debut, scored an equalizing goal against Lazio giving Torino a 2–2 draw. In the 2008 January transfer window, he was loaned out to Livorno.

During the 2009 season Vailatti returned to Torino for the start of the 2008-09 season. On 31 May 2009 he scored a goal in a 3–2 loss to Roma. After not featuring regularly during 2009–10 season Vailatti started to receive interest from various foreign clubs. He was offered a deal with Romanian club CS Gaz Metan Mediaş and Swiss club FC Locarno during the winter transfer season but rejected the moves. It was also reported that Vailatti was offered a deal with New York Red Bulls.

In September 2010 he goes to Ternana Calcio

== Honours ==
=== Club ===
Torino F.C.

- Serie B

- Seria A Playoffs (2): 2004-05; 2005-06

=== Individual ===
- Cercasi Calciatore Disperatamente (Best young football player of Italy) : 2006
