= Doudou Diaw =

Senegalese footballer and manager

Personal information
- Date of birth: 30 October 1975 (age 50)
- Place of birth: Pikine, Senegal
- Height: 1.87 m (6 ft 2 in)
- Position: Defender

Team information
- Current team: Corato (head coach)

Senior career*
Years	Team	Apps	(Gls)
1997–1998	Perugia	0	(0)
1998–1999	S.S. Milazzo	16	(2)
1999–2000	Igea Virtus	21	(1)
2000–2001	Ancona	26	(0)
2001–2005	Bari	85	(1)
2005–2006	Torino	24	(0)
2007–2008	Cesena	33	(0)
2008–2009	Avellino	26	(1)
2009–2011	Cisco Roma	62	(1)
2011–2012	Pergocrema	15	(1)
2012	Matera	0	(0)
2012–2013	Monterotondo Lupa	?	(1)
2013–2014	Maccarese	10	(0)
2014	Atletico Mola	0	(0)

Managerial career
- 2018: FBC Gravina
- 2022–2023: Fidelis Andria
- 2023–: Corato
- * Club domestic league appearances and goals

Doudou Diaw (born 30 October 1975), also known as Diaw Doudou or just Doudou, is a Senegalese football coach and former professional footballer and manager. He is the head coach of Eccellenza Apulia amateurs Corato.

== Playing career ==
Doudou spent his entire football career in Italy, joining Serie B club Perugia in 1997. After several experiences in the minor leagues, he signed for Serie B club Ancona in 2000, where he was noted by Bari, who signed him a year later.

After four years with Bari, in 2005 he signed with then-Serie B side Torino, and made his Serie A debut with the Granata a year later. He ended his career in 2014 after a number of seasons in the minor leagues of Italy.

== Coaching career ==
Doudou started his coaching career in 2014 working with a football school in Bari, his city of residence. In 2017 he was hired by Serie D club Gravina as their new assistant coach, and successively promoted head coach by January 2018.

In July 2019, shortly after obtaining a UEFA A coaching licence, he was hired by his former club Bari as a youth coach, being in charge of the Under-15 side in his first season. He was successively made in charge of the Under-17 a year later, and the Under-19 Berretti side in March 2021. He was substituted by Valeriano Loseto in May 2021.

On 14 July 2022, Doudou was appointed in charge of the Under-19 team of Fidelis Andria.

On 1 November 2022, he was appointed in charge of the first team on an interim basis following the dismissal of head coach Mirko Cudini. On 17 November 2022 he was formally confirmed as permanent head coach. He was sacked on 17 January 2023, leaving Fidelis Andria at the bottom of the Serie C league.

On 24 October 2023, Doudou was hired as the new head coach of Eccellenza Apulia amateurs Corato.

== Personal life ==
Doudou, a practicing Muslim, has been married since 2005 to a Catholic Italian woman from Bari, with whom he has two children (a son and a daughter).
