= 2005–06 Serie B =

Italian football league season

Serie B TIM
- Season: 2005–06
- Promoted: Atalanta (5th title); Catania; Torino (via play-off)
- Relegated: Catanzaro (to C2); Cremonese; Ternana; Avellino (via play-off)
- Matches: 462
- Goals: 1,047 (2.27 per match)
- Top goalscorer: (Italy) Christian Bucchi (29 goals)

Serie B 2005–06 team distribution

The 2005–06 Serie B is the 74th season since its establishment in 1929. It is the second highest football league in Italy.

== Teams ==
Cremonese, Rimini, Mantova and Avellino had been promoted from Serie C, while Bologna, Brescia and Atalanta had been relegated from Serie A.

=== Stadiums and locations ===
These are the 22 teams which took part in the Serie B 2005-06:

Club Name	Home City	Stadium	2004-05 season
AlbinoLeffe	Bergamo	Stadio Atleti Azzurri d'Italia	11th in Serie B
Arezzo	Arezzo	Stadio Città di Arezzo	14th in Serie B
Atalanta	Bergamo	Stadio Atleti Azzurri d'Italia	20th in Serie A
Avellino	Avellino	Stadio Partenio-Adriano Lombardi	Serie C1/B Playoffs winners
Bari	Bari	Stadio San Nicola	10th in Serie B
Bologna	Bologna	Stadio Renato dall'Ara	18th in Serie A
Brescia	Brescia	Stadio Mario Rigamonti	19th in Serie A
Catania	Catania	Stadio Angelo Massimino	12th in Serie B
Catanzaro	Catanzaro	Stadio Nicola Ceravolo	21st in Serie B
Cesena	Cesena	Stadio Dino Manuzzi	15th in Serie B
Cremonese	Cremona	Stadio Giovanni Zini	Serie C1/A Champions
Crotone	Crotone	Stadio Ezio Scida	9th in Serie B
Hellas Verona	Verona	Stadio Marcantonio Bentegodi	6th in Serie B
Mantova	Mantova	Stadio Danilo Martelli	Serie C1/A Playoffs winners
Modena	Modena	Stadio Alberto Braglia	7th in Serie B
Pescara	Pescara	Stadio Adriatico	19th in Serie B
Piacenza	Piacenza	Stadio Leonardo Garilli	9th in Serie B
Rimini	Rimini	Stadio Romeo Neri	Serie C1/B Champions
Ternana	Terni	Stadio Libero Liberati	8th in Serie B
Torino	Turin	Stadio delle Alpi	2nd in Serie B
Triestina	Trieste	Stadio Nereo Rocco	18th in Serie B
Vicenza	Vicenza	Stadio Romeo Menti	17th in Serie B

=== Personnel and kits ===
Team	President	Manager	Kit manufacturer	Shirt sponsor
AlbinoLeffe	(Italy) Gianfranco Andreoletti	(Italy) Emiliano Mondonico	Legea	BPU Assicurazioni
Arezzo	(Italy) Piero Mancini	(Italy) Elio Gustinetti	Legea	Banca Etruria
Atalanta	(Italy) Ivan Ruggeri	(Italy) Stefano Colantuono	Asics	Sit-in Sport, Elesite
Avellino	(Italy) Marco Pugliese	(Italy) Franco Colomba	Legea	AIR Autoservizi Irpini
Bari	(Italy) Vincenzo Matarrese	(Italy) Guido Carboni	Erreà	Gaudianello
Bologna	(Italy) Alfredo Cazzola	(Italy) Renzo Ulivieri	Macron	Europonteggi
Brescia	(Italy) Gino Corioni	(Czech Republic) Zdeněk Zeman	Kappa	Banco di Brescia
Catania	(Italy) Antonino Pulvirenti	(Italy) Pasquale Marino	Legea	SP Energia Siciliana
Catanzaro	(Italy) Claudio Parente	(Italy) Franco Cittadino	Asics	Siamo tutti calabresi/Catanzaro nel cuore/Prendo.it/Radio Catanzaro Classic (in cup matches), Catanzaro Città tra due mari
Cesena	(Italy) Giorgio Lugaresi	(Italy) Fabrizio Castori	Lotto	Solo Affitti
Cremonese	(Italy) Luigi Gualco	(Italy) Giovanni Dellacasa	Macron	Air Seychelles
Crotone	(Italy) Raffaele Vrenna	(Italy) Gian Piero Gasperini	Zeus	Frais Monde/Sovreco, Mediaservice s.r.l.
Hellas Verona	(Italy) Giambattista Pastorello	(Italy) Massimo Ficcadenti	Legea	Clerman
Mantova	(Italy) Fabrizio Lori	(Italy) Domenico Di Carlo	Erreà	Nuova Pansac
Modena	(Italy) Romano Amadei	(Italy) Stefano Pioli	Erreà	Immergas, Alberti & Tagliazucchi
Pescara	(Italy) Dante Paterna	(Italy) Maurizio Sarri	Lotto	Eurovision TV/Mait, Rete8
Piacenza	(Italy) Fabrizio Garilli	(Italy) Giuseppe Iachini	Macron	UNICEF
Rimini	(Italy) Luca Benedettini	(Italy) Leonardo Acori	Hummel	Banca di Rimini/Riviera di Rimini
Ternana	(Italy) Luca Ferramosca	(Italy) Domenico Caso	Macron	Imhotep s.r.l.
Torino	(Italy) Urbano Cairo	(Italy) Gianni De Biasi	Asics	Il Buon Riso/MG K.Vis/Professionecasa/Dipiù/Reale Mutua, Fratelli Beretta
Triestina	(Italy) Flaviano Tonellotto	(Italy) Andrea Agostinelli	Asics	Bossini
Vicenza	(Italy) (Egypt) Sergio Cassingena	(Italy) Giancarlo Camolese	A-Line	Recoaro

== Final classification ==
Pos	Team	Pld	W	D	L	GF	GA	GD	Pts	Promotion or relegation
1	Atalanta (P, C)	42	24	9	9	61	39	+22	81	Promotion to Serie A
2	Catania (P)	42	22	12	8	67	42	+25	78	Promotion to Serie A
3	Torino (O, P)	42	21	13	8	51	31	+20	76	Qualification to promotion play-offs
4	Mantova	42	18	15	9	46	35	+11	69	Qualification to promotion play-offs
5	Modena	42	17	16	9	59	41	+18	67	Qualification to promotion play-offs
6	Cesena	42	18	12	12	66	54	+12	66	Qualification to promotion play-offs
7	Arezzo	42	17	15	10	45	34	+11	66	
8	Bologna	42	16	16	10	55	42	+13	64	
9	Crotone	42	18	9	15	56	48	+8	63	
10	Brescia	42	15	15	12	54	44	+10	60	
11	Pescara	42	14	12	16	41	50	−9	54	
12	Piacenza	42	13	15	14	56	52	+4	54	
13	Bari	42	11	18	13	43	47	−4	51	
14	Triestina	42	12	15	15	44	51	−7	51	
15	Hellas Verona	42	10	19	13	42	41	+1	49	
16	Vicenza	42	13	10	19	38	49	−11	49	
17	Rimini	42	11	15	16	42	49	−7	48	
18	AlbinoLeffe	42	10	16	16	38	52	−14	46	Qualification to relegation play-offs
19	Avellino (R)	42	11	13	18	42	62	−20	46	Qualification to relegation play-offs
20	Ternana (R)	42	7	18	17	36	58	−22	39	Relegation to Serie C1
21	Cremonese (R)	42	6	12	24	36	60	−24	30	Relegation to Serie C1
22	Catanzaro (R, E, R)	42	7	7	28	26	63	−37	28	Phoenix in Serie C2 (Note: Relegated and then restored as a phoenix in Serie C2 by the Lodo Petrucci for financial problems.)

Source: Almanacco Illustrato del Calcio 2007, Panini Edizioni, Modena, November 2006
Rules for classification: 1) points; 2) head-to-head points; 3) head-to-head goal difference; 4) head-to-head goals scored; 5) goal difference; 6) number of goals scored.
(C) Champions; (E) Eliminated; (O) Play-off winners; (P) Promoted; (R) Relegated

== Results ==
Home \ Away	ALB	ARE	ATA	AVE	BAR	BOL	BRE	CTN	CTZ	CES	CRE	CRO	MAN	MOD	PES	PIA	RIM	TER	TOR	TRI	HEL	VIC
AlbinoLeffe	—	1–0	2–3	2–0	2–0	2–2	2–2	2–2	0–0	0–3	0–0	3–2	2–1	0–0	2–0	2–2	2–2	1–0	0–0	1–1	0–0	0–1
Arezzo	2–0	—	2–0	3–1	0–0	1–3	0–0	0–0	1–0	1–0	1–1	2–0	2–0	1–1	2–2	1–0	2–1	3–1	1–2	1–1	3–2	0–0
Atalanta	2–0	2–0	—	2–0	1–0	1–0	2–0	1–2	3–1	2–2	2–0	1–0	2–1	0–1	3–0	2–1	3–0	2–0	2–1	1–0	3–2	1–0
Avellino	2–1	0–2	0–0	—	1–1	2–2	2–5	1–1	2–0	2–0	2–1	1–0	0–0	5–4	1–3	1–1	1–1	1–1	1–0	0–1	1–1	2–1
Bari	3–1	1–1	2–1	2–0	—	0–1	1–0	0–2	1–0	2–3	1–0	1–3	1–1	2–2	2–2	1–1	1–0	2–0	2–2	1–1	1–1	2–1
Bologna	4–0	1–1	1–1	2–0	1–0	—	3–1	2–1	3–0	0–0	1–1	1–2	0–0	1–2	2–1	2–1	1–0	1–3	1–1	0–1	2–1	4–1
Brescia	3–0	0–0	1–0	4–0	2–2	1–1	—	2–0	2–0	3–2	1–0	2–0	0–0	2–2	3–0	1–1	0–2	0–0	0–1	1–0	3–2	0–3
Catania	2–1	0–0	4–1	2–0	0–1	1–1	2–1	—	3–0	1–0	2–1	3–2	3–0	3–2	3–0	3–1	0–0	3–1	1–1	1–1	0–0	2–2
Catanzaro	1–3	1–2	1–2	1–2	0–0	0–2	1–2	1–3	—	2–4	1–1	1–0	0–1	1–0	1–0	1–1	1–0	0–1	0–1	2–1	0–0	1–1
Cesena	2–2	2–1	0–2	3–2	2–1	2–0	0–1	1–0	4–1	—	2–1	0–0	2–0	2–4	0–0	2–2	2–1	3–2	1–2	0–0	2–1	1–0
Cremonese	0–0	0–1	0–1	1–0	1–1	2–2	1–1	2–4	2–0	2–3	—	2–0	1–2	0–1	2–0	1–2	2–1	2–2	0–1	0–0	0–2	2–3
Crotone	3–0	1–0	1–0	2–1	2–1	3–0	4–2	3–1	2–1	2–2	3–1	—	1–1	1–0	0–0	4–0	0–1	1–1	1–1	4–2	2–1	0–2
Mantova	1–0	1–0	1–0	3–0	1–0	0–2	1–0	3–0	0–0	3–2	0–0	3–2	—	2–0	0–0	1–1	3–1	1–1	1–0	2–2	0–0	0–1
Modena	1–2	0–0	2–2	2–0	4–1	0–0	2–1	2–1	1–0	2–2	3–0	1–0	0–0	—	2–0	1–0	2–2	2–0	2–1	2–0	1–1	0–0
Pescara	0–1	1–1	2–2	0–2	1–0	0–0	0–3	0–1	0–1	3–2	3–1	1–2	2–1	1–0	—	1–0	1–0	1–0	0–2	5–1	1–0	3–1
Piacenza	1–0	2–3	3–0	2–0	1–1	2–1	3–1	1–1	2–1	2–2	2–1	3–0	1–3	0–0	0–0	—	0–0	4–0	1–0	3–4	0–1	2–1
Rimini	1–0	2–0	0–0	3–3	2–1	1–3	0–0	1–2	4–2	1–1	2–0	1–0	1–3	1–1	0–2	0–0	—	2–1	2–1	1–2	0–0	1–0
Ternana	1–0	1–0	0–0	0–2	1–1	1–1	2–2	0–0	0–2	0–3	1–1	1–1	1–1	1–1	2–2	2–1	2–1	—	0–0	2–2	0–2	2–0
Torino	1–0	1–2	2–2	1–0	0–0	0–0	1–1	2–1	2–0	1–0	3–0	0–0	2–0	2–1	1–1	2–1	1–0	1–1	—	2–1	2–1	2–0
Triestina	1–1	1–0	1–2	0–0	0–0	0–0	1–0	1–2	2–0	0–1	1–3	2–0	0–1	2–1	2–0	2–2	1–1	2–0	0–2	—	0–3	1–1
Hellas Verona	0–0	1–1	0–1	0–0	2–2	3–1	0–0	1–2	1–0	1–1	1–0	1–1	2–2	1–1	1–1	1–0	2–2	1–0	0–1	0–2	—	1–2
Vicenza	0–0	0–1	3–3	1–1	0–1	2–0	0–0	0–2	1–0	1–0	1–0	0–1	0–1	0–3	0–1	1–3	0–0	2–1	3–2	2–1	0–1	—

Source: Almanacco Illustrato del Calcio 2007, Panini Edizioni, Modena, November 2006
Legend: Blue = home team win; Yellow = draw; Red = away team win.

== Play-off ==
=== Promotion play-off ===
hc = higher classified team in the regular season

==== Semifinals ====
Team 1	Agg.	Team 2	1st leg	2nd leg
Cesena	1-2	Torino	1-1	0-1
Modena	1-1 (hc)	Mantova	0-0	1-1

June 1, 2006

Cesena	1-1	Torino
Salvetti 16'		Longo 45+'

June 1, 2006

Modena	0-0	Mantova

June 4, 2006

Torino	1-0	Cesena
Balestri 43'

June 4, 2006

Mantova	1-1	Modena
Gasparetto 5'		Bucchi 88'

==== Finals ====
Team 1	Agg.	Team 2	1st leg	2nd leg
Mantova	5-5(hc)	Torino	4-2	1-3(aet)

June 8, 2006

Mantova	4-2	Torino
Cioffi 8'; Caridi 22'; Noselli 48' (pen.); Caridi 67' (pen.)		Longo 6'; Abbruscato 74'

June 11, 2006

Torino	3-1	Mantova
Rosina 36' (pen.); Muzzi 63'; Nicola 95'		Poggi 101' (pen.)

=== Relegation play-off ===
Team 1	Agg.	Team 2	1st leg	2nd leg
Avellino	3-4	AlbinoLeffe	0-2	3-2

June 3, 2006

Avellino	0-2	AlbinoLeffe
		Joelson 70'; Regonesi 77'

June 7, 2006

AlbinoLeffe	2-3	Avellino
Russo 66'; Regonesi 69' (pen.)		Millesi 59'; Millesi 79'; Monticciolo 84'

== Topscorers ==
Place	Scorer	Scored	Team	Penalties
1.	(Italy) Cristian Bucchi	29	Modena	12
2.	(Italy) Claudio Bellucci	25	Bologna	5
3.	(Italy) Gionatha Spinesi	23	Catania	6
4.	(Italy) Daniele Cacia	18	Piacenza	3
5.	(Lithuania) Tomas Danilevičius	17	Avellino	2
5.	(Italy) Emiliano Salvetti	17	Cesena	7
7.	(Italy) Marco Carparelli	15	Cremonese	4
7.	(Italy) Nicola Ventola	15	Atalanta	4
7.	(Brazil) Adaílton	15	Hellas Verona	5
7.	(Liechtenstein) Mario Frick	15	Ternana	6

== Attendances ==
#	Club	Average
1	Torino	24,995
2	Catania	14,446
3	Bologna	10,919
4	Atalanta	10,126
5	Hellas	8,606
6	Mantova	8,448
7	Cesena	7,647
8	Modena	7,576
9	Avellino	6,521
10	Rimini	6,138
11	Triestina	5,717
12	Catanzaro	5,513
13	Vicenza	5,315
14	Crotone	5,221
15	Arezzo	5,086
16	Bari	4,848
17	Piacenza	4,744
18	Brescia	4,491
19	Ternana	3,974
20	Pescara	3,376
21	Cremonese	3,327
22	AlbinoLeffe	1,477
