= USD Atletico Catania =

Italian football club

Atletico Catania
- Full name: Unione Sportiva Dilettantistica Atletico Catania
- Nicknames: Giallorossoblù (The Yellow, Red & Blue), Etnei (The Etneans)
- Founded: 1970; 56 years ago as Sporting Club Mascalucia; 1994 (refounded); 2005 (refounded)
- Dissolved: 1988
- Ground: Stadio Monte Po
- Capacity: 1,000
- Manager: Gianluca Barbagallo
- Coach: Fabrizio Belluso
- League: Promozione
- 2024–25: Prima Categoria Sicily, Group F, 1th of 12 (promoted)
- Website: https://atleticocatania.com/
Home colours	Away colours	Third colours

Unione Sportiva Dilettantistica Atletico Catania, commonly known as Atletico Catania (pronounced [aˈtlɛːtiko kaˈtaːnja]), is an Italian football club based in Catania, Sicily, who compete in Promozione, the sixth tier of the Italian football league system. Throughout its history, the club played extensively at Serie C1 and Serie C2 professional level.

== History ==
The club was founded in 1967 as Sport Club Mascalucia, then renamed and relocated in 1986 by the Catanese entrepreneur Salvatore Tabita. They won their local title and were thus promoted to Serie C2. After finishing in 10th place in their first season, they went on to change their name in 1989 to Atletico Leonzio and moved to Lentini. The team was then acquired by Franco Proto, and won promotion into Serie C1 in 1993.

In 1994 Proto, trying to satisfy the absence of a football club in the city of Catania, brought the club from Lentini. Their home games were moved to the 21,000 capacity stadium of Stadio Angelo Massimino. This was because Catania's primary and historical club, Calcio Catania, had been cancelled in 1993 by the FIGC; Calcio Catania were however later entered into the Sicilian Eccellenza due to a court decision.

The club changed their name from Atletico Leonzio to Atletico Catania, doing a controversial move, specially in the eyes of the club's fans from Lentini. They played for seven seasons in Serie C, coming close to promotion to Serie B twice, reaching the playoffs in both 1996–97 and 1997–98, but missing out both times.

=== Recent times ===
The 2000s have been far more difficult for the club. They were relegated down to the Sicilian Eccellenza in 2001 because of financial difficulties. In 2002 Proto sold the club to Paolo Pinazzo and Gianfranco Vullo. Atletico Catania went on sliding further down, and was again cancelled in 2005, when a group of supporters led by Santino Crisafi founded a new club with the current denomination and registered it to Terza Categoria, the lowest division in Italian football, for the 2005–06 season. That year Atletico Catania reached a fourth place, not enough for gaining promotion. However, little before the beginning of season 2006–07, Atletico Catania won the title of the Sant'Agata li Battiati making them applicable to play in the Prima Categoria. The new club ended its 2006–07 campaign in eighth place. The club was renamed as U.S.D. Atletico Catania for the 2007–08 season, that saw the atletisti winning the Round F of Prima Categoria league, being thus promoted to Promozione for the 2008–09 season. They completed their first Promozione season in eighth place, playing their home games in the neighbouring town of Aci Bonaccorsi. They have moved back to Catania for the 2009–10 season, playing at the Campo Comunale "Zia Lisa". They promoted to Eccellenza Sicily in 2010–11 season but relegated back to Promozione at next season after finishing 14th.

Atletico Catania returned to Eccellenza in 2015, as they were admitted to fill a vacancy in the league. After an immediate relegation, they successively were promoted once again to Eccellenza in 2017 as Promozione winners.

== Notable former managers ==
- (Italy) Francesco D'Arrigo
- (Switzerland) Roberto Morinini
- (Italy) Pietro Paolo Virdis
