= Matteo Melara =

Italian footballer

Personal information
- Date of birth: 8 July 1979 (age 47)
- Place of birth: Mirandola, Italy
- Height: 1.87 m (6 ft 1 1/2 in)
- Position: Defender

Youth career
- Bologna

Senior career*
| Years | Team | Apps | (Gls) |
| 1997–1998 | Bologna | 0 | (0) |
| 1998–2000 | Alessandria | 47 | (1) |
| 2000–2001 | Cremonese | 30 | (6) |
| 2001–2005 | Livorno | 112 | (5) |
| 2005–2006 | Torino (on loan) | 21 | (2) |
| 2005–2006 | Livorno | 6 | (1) |
| 2006 | Torino | 0 | (0) |
| 2007 | Ascoli | 16 | (0) |
| 2007–2008 | Torino | 0 | (0) |
| 2008 | Livorno | 4 | (0) |
| 2010–2011 | Reno Centese | 4 | (0) |
| 2012 | Pro Desenzano | 0 | (0) |
- * Club domestic league appearances and goals

Matteo Melara (born 8 July 1978) is an Italian former footballer who played for Serie A teams Livorno and Ascoli in the role of a defender. He is 187 cm tall.

On 20 January 2007, he played his first Ascoli Serie A game against Livorno

He mutually cancelled his contract with Torino F.C. in August 2008.
