= ASD Flaminia Civita Castellana =

Italian football club

Flaminia Civita Castellana
- Full name: Associazione Sportiva Dilettantistica Flaminia Civita Castellana
- Founded: 2008
- Ground: Stadio Turiddu Madami, Civita Castellana, Italy
- Capacity: 1,800
- Chairman: Roberto Ciappici
- Manager: Federico Nofri Onofri
- League: Serie D/G
- 2017–18: 12th
Home colours	Away colours

Associazione Sportiva Dilettantistica Flaminia Civita Castellana is an Italian association football club located in Civita Castellana, Lazio. It currently plays in Serie D.

== History ==
The club was founded in 2008 after the merger of A.S.D. Bassano Romano and A.S. Sassacci of Civita Castellana.

== Colors and badge ==
Its colors are red and blue.
