= Vedin Musić =

Bosnian footballer

Personal information
- Full name: Vedin Musić
- Date of birth: 11 March 1973 (age 53)
- Place of birth: Gračanica, SFR Yugoslavia
- Height: 1.69 m (5 ft 6 1/2 in)
- Position: Left-back

Senior career*
Years	Team	Apps	(Gls)
1994–1996	Sloboda Tuzla		
1996–1998	İstanbulspor	39	(9)
1998–2001	Antalyaspor	89	(2)
2001–2003	Como	62	(5)
2003–2005	Modena	27	(1)
2005–2007	Torino	22	(0)
2007	→ Treviso (loan)	17	(0)
2007–2008	Padova	31	(0)
2008–2009	Pro Patria	32	(1)
2009–2010	Arezzo	25	(0)
2011	Čelik Zenica	0	(0)

International career
1995–2007	Bosnia and Herzegovina	45	(0)
- * Club domestic league appearances and goals

Vedin Musić (born 11 March 1973) is a Bosnian former footballer who played as a left-back.

== Club career ==
Musić started his career at FK Sloboda Tuzla, where he played in the Bosnian League after the end of the War in Bosnia and Herzegovina.

== International career ==
He made his debut in Bosnia and Herzegovina's first ever official international game, a November 1995 friendly match away against Albania, and has earned a total earned a total of 45 caps, scoring no goals. His final international was a June 2007 European Championship qualification match against Malta.

== Honours ==
Como

- Serie B: 2001–02
