= Luigi Martinelli (footballer) =

Italian footballer

Personal information
- Full name: Luigi Martinelli
- Date of birth: September 2, 1970 (age 56)
- Place of birth: Chiari, Italy
- Height: 1.82 m (5 ft 11 1/2 in)
- Position: Defender

Youth career
- Barletta

Senior career*
Years	Team	Apps	(Gls)
1990–1994	Barletta	79	(2)
1994–1995	Fiorenzuola	16	(0)
1995–1997	Trapani	47	(0)
1997–2001	Alzano Virescit	104	(2)
2000–2001	Chievo	6	(0)
2001–2003	Siena	46	(0)
2003–2005	Ascoli	32	(0)
2005–2007	Torino	26	(1)
- * Club domestic league appearances and goals as of 1 September 2007

Luigi Martinelli (born September 2, 1970 in Chiari) is an Italian former footballer who played for Serie C1 team Hellas Verona as a defender.
