= Gaetano Caridi =

Italian footballer (born 1980)

Personal information
- Date of birth: 22 July 1980 (age 46)
- Place of birth: Reggio Calabria, Italy
- Height: 1.76 m (5 ft 9 in)
- Position: Midfielder

Team information
- Current team: Genoa (assistant)

Youth career
- 1996–1998: Reggina

Senior career*
Years	Team	Apps	(Gls)
1998–1999	Chiasso	0	(0)
1999–2000	Pontedera	22	(4)
2000–2002	AlzanoCene	30	(1)
2001	→ Avellino (loan)	10	(3)
2002–2010	Mantova	266	(50)
2010–2012	Grosseto	64	(17)
2012–2013	Pro Vercelli	18	(1)
2013–2014	Cremonese	38	(4)
2014–2017	Mantova	85	(11)
2017–2019	AC Rezzato	53	(5)
- * Club domestic league appearances and goals

Gaetano Caridi (born 22 July 1980) is an Italian professional football manager and former professional football player. He is the currently assistant manager of Serie A club Genoa.

== Career ==
Caridi was born in Reggio Calabria. He began his career playing for minor Tuscan club Pontedera. He made his debut with the then-Serie C2 club in 1999, aged 19, playing 22 matches and scoring four goals. He then earned a move to promotion chasing Serie C1 side Alzano Virescit, where he made 15 appearances before being loaned to Avellino in January 2001. With the biancoverdi, he played 10 matches scoring three goals before returning at Alzano.

After 15 league matches played for Alzano in the first half of the 2001–02 season, he was signed by Serie C2 side Mantova in January 2002 after suggestion by then-head coach Roberto Boninsegna.

The 2002–03 season proved to be a turning point for the 22-year-old Caridi. He agreed to sign for free with Mantova and proved instrumental to make telling passes as Mantova came close to promotion. In 2003–04 Caridi made 32 appearances, scoring 8 goals as Mantova earned promotion to Serie C1.

In 2004–05 Mantova earned promotion to Serie B at their first attempt, with Caridi helping to create many of the goals with his technique and vision, as well as scoring 10 goals. In their first season in Serie B Caridi was moved up as a deep lying striker, a role more similar to the likes of Gianfranco Zola. Mantova finish fourth, losing a third consecutive promotion on playoffs to Torino, and Caridi scored 14 league goals in the process. In 2006–07 Caridi confirmed his qualities, scoring an impressive 11 goals in 35 matches, many of them coming from direct free kicks. He was nicknamed "Don Tano" by Mantova fans due to his Southern Italy origins.

In July 2010 he completed his move to Tuscan Serie B team U.S. Grosseto F.C. Caridi played his first match in pre-season friendly on 22 July. On 13 July 2012, Caridi joined newly promoted Serie B club F.C. Pro Vercelli 1892 on a free transfer.

In January 2013 he signed an 18-month contract with Cremonese; since the summer of 2014 he returned to the military in the Mantova.

== Coaching career ==
After retiring at the end of the 2018–19 season, F.C. Pro Vercelli 1892 announced on 11 July 2019, that Caridi would become the assistant manager of Alberto Gilardino for the club's first team. He followed Gilardino as his assistant also at Siena, throughout the 2020–21 Serie D and 2021–22 Serie C seasons; they were both dismissed from their jobs on 24 October 2021.

After Gilardino's appointment as youth coach of Genoa, Caridi followed him as his assistant, both being successively promoted in charge of the first team following Alexander Blessin's dismissal; they ended the season leading Genoa to promotion to Serie A.
