= Alessandro Rosina =

Italian footballer (born 1984)

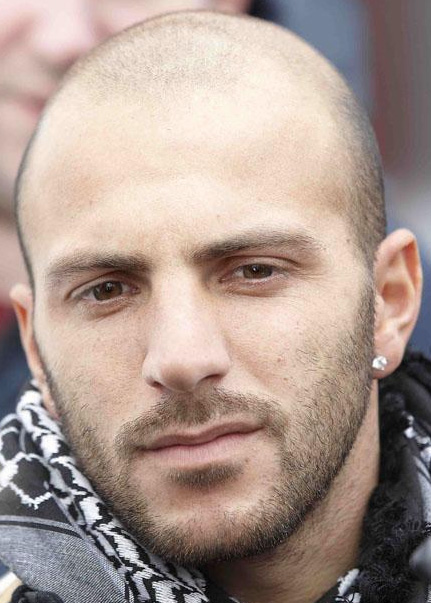

Personal information
- Full name: Alessandro Rosina
- Date of birth: 31 January 1984 (age 42)
- Place of birth: Belvedere Marittimo, Italy
- Height: 1.68 m (5 ft 6 in)
- Positions: Attacking midfielder; winger

Youth career
- Parma

Senior career*
Years	Team	Apps	(Gls)
2002–2005	Parma	25	(0)
2005	→ Hellas Verona (loan)	17	(2)
2005–2009	Torino	143	(32)
2009–2012	Zenit St. Petersburg	34	(4)
2011	→ Cesena (loan)	10	(1)
2012–2014	Siena	71	(18)
2014–2016	Catania	37	(8)
2015–2016	→ Bari (loan)	41	(12)
2016–2020	Salernitana	75	(11)

International career
2004–2007	Italy U-21	32	(4)
2007	Italy	1	(0)
Medal record
Men's football
Representing Italy
UEFA European Under-21 Championship
Winner	2004 Germany
- * Club domestic league appearances and goals

Alessandro Rosina (Italian pronunciation: [alesˈsandro roˈziːna]; born 31 January 1984) is an Italian former footballer who played as an attacking midfielder or winger.

== Club career ==
=== Early career ===
Born in Belvedere Marittimo, Rosina resided until the age of 9 in the nearby town of Bonifati (the town of origin of his maternal family), he starting his career at local Cittadella del Capo football youth team at the age of 5, where he caught the eye of Juventus, Roma and Milan scouts. His father, however, decided to let him join Parma. He was subsequently brought up in the club's youth system.

Rosina spent the 2001–02 season playing for the Parma Primavera team. He was promoted to the first team the next season, making his professional debut on 16 February 2003 against Juventus as a substitute for Hidetoshi Nakata. In two and a half years at the club, he made 25 league appearances. Rosina was a member of the B squad in the 2003–04 UEFA Cup.

Following a tactical change to the team's formation, Rosina found first-team opportunities hard to come by. In January 2005 he was loaned to Hellas Verona, where he had a hugely successful spell. After the end of the loan he was bought by Torino, then in Serie B.

=== Torino ===
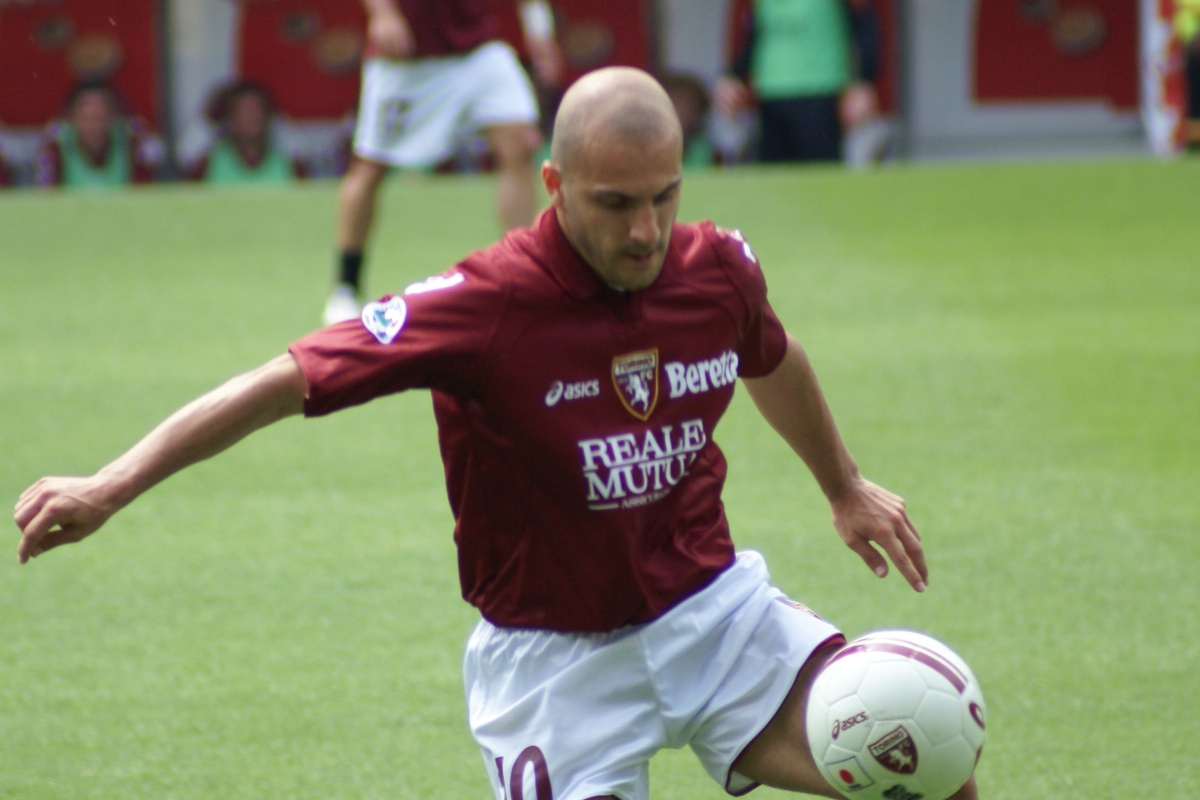
Rosina with Torino.

Rosina was regarded as a revelation since his arrival at the Turin club. He became the driving force behind Torino's 2005–06 promotion campaign, making 42 appearances, scoring twelve times, as the club clinched a spot in the Italian top flight the following season. In two subsequent Serie A seasons, he dragged the team to survival from relegation, averaging a goal every three games as well as providing several assists. As a result, he earned the captain's armband in January 2008 and became a popular figure amongst Torino fans. He was nicknamed Rosinaldo, a portmanteau of his last name and Ronaldo's name, due to his Brazilian-style flair. He stayed loyal to Torino despite awakening the interest of Italian powerhouses, signing a contract extension until 2011 in 2007.

The 2008–2009 season was a major setback for Torino, as Rosina was unable to prevent the club from suffering relegation.

=== Zenit ===
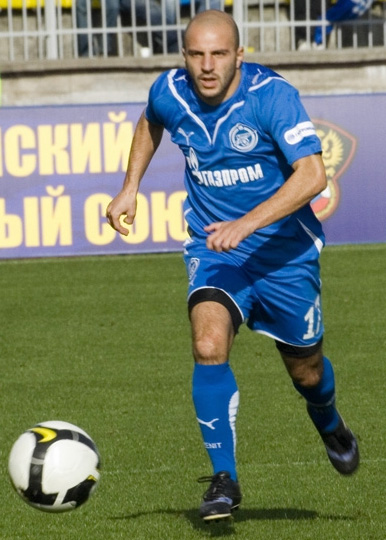
Rosina in action for Zenit.

On 31 July 2009, Rosina was sold to Russian Premier League club Zenit St. Petersburg for a fee in the region of €7 million, signing a 4-year contract with Sine-Belo-Golubyye. Dick Advocaat, then-manager of Zenit who planned to quit the club at the end of the year to become Belgium coach, declared himself unhappy with the acquisition of Rosina and Sergei Kornilenko, labelling them newly appointed sporting director Igor Korneev's creatures, as the Dutch gaffer wished to sign two top-class forwards, namely Goran Pandev and Paolo Guerrero, instead. Nevertheless, Rosina made his debut on 5 August 2009 against FC Nizhny Novgorod in Russian Cup, also scoring his first Zenit goal, and played full 90 minutes in subsequent league game against Tom.

As Zenit lost to Tom at home, Advocaat was replaced at the helm by former Zenit player Anatoli Davydov, who soon afterwards brought in another offensive midfielder, controversial Vladimir Bystrov. Despite finding little playing time through tough competition, Rosina had impressed on occasions, achieving a total of two goals and two assists in nine RFPL games out of remaining fourteen.

2010 preseason saw another head coach change, as fellow Italian Luciano Spalletti took reign. However, with Danny having recovered from cruciate ligaments injury, Rosina again found himself on the bench at the start of the season. Being used mainly as a substitute, he managed to contribute with a vital assist against archrivals Spartak Moscow, finding Nicolas Lombaerts' head with a perfect cross in a game that finished 1–1.

As Spalletti settled to a counterattacking 4–3–3 or 4–2–3–1 formation with two wingers, and established internationals Danny, Konstantin Zyryanov and Danko Lazović all being options on the left, left-footed Rosina was mainly used in the rotation on the right as a backup for Bystrov. He scored after coming on as a substitute in 6–1 trashing of Saturn in September, rounding the keeper and scoring in the empty net.

On 29 January 2011, before the start of Russian Premier League 2011–12 season, Rosina was loaned to Serie A side Cesena until July 2011.

=== Cesena ===
Rosina made his debut for Cesena on 2 February 2011 against Catania, coming on as a substitute in the 81st minute for Emanuele Giaccherini. He scored his first goal for Cesena on 20 February 2011 against Parma, firing home the opener in the 31st minute. Rosina struggled with his fitness during his time on loan and amassed only 9 league appearances for Serie A newcomers.

=== Return to Zenit ===
After his loan deal with Cesena came to an end, Rosina returned to Zenit and was subsequently registered for Russian Premier League football. On 14 August he was included in the starting line-up against Amkar and put off a dynamic performance, but due to below-par passing and general lack of end product he was substituted even before the break. Despite this, Zenit head coach Luciano Spalletti praised Rosina for his footballing attitude and determination to fight for a place in the team, promising him a squad role for the remainder of the season. Rosina had to fight off competition from Lazović, Aleksei Ionov, Szabolcs Huszti as well as recovering Bystrov. In April, he won his second Russian Premier League title.

=== Return to Italy ===
On 31 August 2012, Rosina was sold to Siena. He spent two seasons with the club, until its bankruptcy in July 2014.

On 23 July 2014, he signed with Serie B club Catania.

== International career ==
Rosina was a member of the Italy U-21 team from 2004 to 2007.

On 17 October 2007, Rosina made his Italy national team debut against South Africa in an international friendly match.

== Honours ==
=== Club ===
Zenit St. Petersburg

- Russian Premier League: 2010, 2012
- Russian Cup: 2010

=== International ===
Italy U-21

- UEFA European Under-21 Football Championship: 2004

=== Individual ===
- UEFA European Under-21 Championship Team of the Tournament: 2007
