= AS Lodigiani =

Lodigiani
- Full name: Associazione Sportiva Dilettantistica Lodigiani 1972
- Founded: 1972; 54 years ago
- Ground: La Borghesiana, Rome
- Capacity: 240
- Chairman: Andrea Simonetti
- Manager: Fabio Marziali
- League: Eccellenza
- Website: www.lodigianicalcio1972.it
Home colours	Away colours

Associazione Sportiva Dilettantistica Lodigiani 1972 or Lodigiani in short, is an Italian football club based in Rome, Italy. The club is notable for their youth products. In the 1980s to 2000s, the club played in Serie C1 and Serie C2. In 2004, the club merged with Cisco Calcio Roma and became Cisco Lodigiani, despite that club changed the name back to Cisco Calcio Roma (Cisco Roma) in 2005 and then Atletico Roma F.C. in 2010. Since 2005, was founded as phoenix club of the original A.S. Lodigiani as A.S.D. Atletico Lodigiani. They were amateur football clubs or youth academies.

== History ==
Lodigiani was founded in 1972.

A.S. Lodigiani was known for having one of the finest Italian youth systems, with players such as Francesco Totti, Andrea Silenzi, Luigi Apolloni, David Di Michele, Roberto Stellone etc. among its former youth team footballers.

In 2003, Longarini family sold Lodigiani to Cisco Italia group. That group was owned by Piero Tulli. Cisco Italia also owned A.S. Cisco Calcio Roma, or known as Cisco Roma, before the acquisition.

In 2004–05 Serie C2 season, A.S. Lodigiani was merged with Cisco Roma to become A.S. Cisco Lodigiani. In precise, the license of A.S. Lodigiani was renamed to A.S. Cisco Lodigiani in 2004, which was reverted to Cisco Calcio Roma in 2005. While the license of A.S. Cisco Calcio Roma was sold in 2004, to become A.S.D. Frascati Calcio, which became Lupa Frascati in 2006.

The shuffles made the disappearance of Lodigiani, while Cisco achieved a "promotion" to the professional league, while Lupa Frascati avoided relegation from Serie D, as well as the creation of U.S.D. Tor di Quinto by using the license of the old Lupa Frascati.

== Colours and badge ==
The team's colors were red and white.

== Stadium ==
The headquarters and home stadium of A.S. Lodigiani was located in La Borghesiana, on 120 Via Della Capanna Murata. Before La Borghesiana, Lodigiani used Francesca Gianni as their headquarters. The club also used Stadio Flaminio as home venue in the early 2000s.

== Phoenix clubs ==
=== A.S.D. Lodigiani 2005, A.S.D. Lodigiani Calcio and S.S.D. Lodigiani Calcio 1972 ===
In 2005, two phoenix clubs were founded, A.S.D. N. Lodigiani 2005 and A.S.D. Lodigiani Calcio respectively. A.S.D. N. Lodigiani 2005 was founded by some of the old club's directors. In 2007, A.S.D. Lodigiani Calcio was folded. In 2008, A.S.D. Lodigiani 2005 dropped the N. prefix (Nuova, means new) from the name.

In 2010–11 season, A.S.D. Lodigiani Calcio participated in Promozione Lazio, the Italian 7th highest level at that time. That A.S.D. Lodigiani Calcio was formed by the merger of A.S.D. Lodigiani 2005 and A.S.D. Stilecasa Calcio in 2010. That A.S.D. Lodigiani Calcio was based in La Borghesiana, on 120 Via Della Capanna Murata and has a registration number 932,208. A.S.D. Lodigiani Calcio withdrew from the adult league in 2011, focus on youth sector again.

After the creation of unlicensed team Atletico Lodigiani in 2017 by other investors, A.S.D. Lodigiani Calcio, the trademark owner of "Lodigiani", made an open invitation to use the trademark by submitting proposal to them in 2018.

According to Reset Group Academy (Reset Academy), the 2010 founded A.S.D. Lodigiani Calcio was its affiliated club. The chairman of Reset Academy was Davide Lippi, son of Italian coach Marcello Lippi. Davide Lippi also worked as a football agent.

In 2019, A.S.D. Lodigiani Calcio was merged with A.S.D. Academy Lodigiani, to become S.S.D. Lodigiani Calcio 1972. The merged club participated in 2019–20 Promozione Lazio, since Academy Lodigiani finished as the third in 2018–19 Prima Categoria.

=== A.S.D. Atletico Lodigiani ===
In 2017, the third phoenix club A.S.D. Atletico Lodigiani was founded. Atletico Lodigiani was renamed from A.S.D. Academy F.C. in 2017. That club was from Monte Compatri, in the Metropolitan City of Rome Capital. The registration number of Atletico Lodigiani was 941,435. Another phoenix club, A.S.D. Lodigiani Calcio, contested the creation of Atletico Lodigiani.

Atletico Lodigiani finished as the fourth of 2017–18 Seconda Categoria Lazio Group H, the second lowest level of Italian football league pyramid, or the 8th highest level since 2014.

In 2018, the club was admitted to Prima Categoria Lazio Group E, the Italian 7th highest level since 2014. That season the club finished as the 11th. Since 2018, Atletico Lodigiani used Francesca Gianni stadium as their home venue.

In 2019, A.S.D. Atletico Lodigiani was renamed into A.S.D. Woman Atletico Lodigiani. After renaming, the club participated in 2019–20 Eccellenza Femminile.

=== A.S.D. Academy Lodigiani ===
The fourth phoenix club, A.S.D. Academy Lodigiani was founded in 2018 by the renaming of A.S.D. Atletico San Basilio 1960. The team was named after San Basilio, a quarter of Rome. The registration number of that club was 945,130. That club used La Borghesiana as home stadium for their 2018–19 Prima Categoria Lazio Group B season. Atletico San Basilio 1960 finished as the 4th of Prima Categoria Lazio Group C in 2017–18 season. In the following season, as Academy Lodigiani, the 3rd in the Group B.

In 2019, A.S.D. Academy Lodigiani was merged with A.S.D. Lodigiani Calcio, to become S.S.D. Lodigiani Calcio 1972.

Also in 2019, a phoenix club was formed for San Basilio as Real San Basilio by a renaming of another local club A.S.D. Tor Pignattara. That club was named after the urban planning district Torpignattara.

== Honours ==
- Serie C2
  - Winner (1): 1992
