= Elvis Abbruscato =

Italian footballer (born 1981)

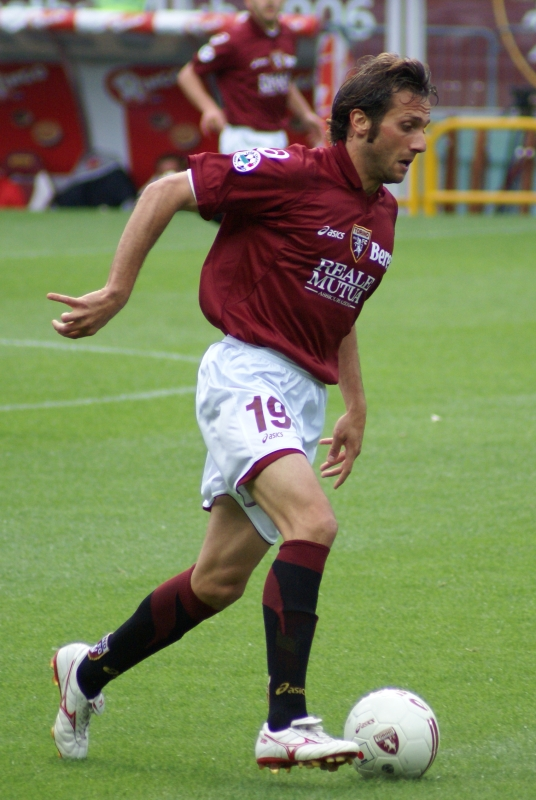

Personal information
- Full name: Elvis Abbruscato
- Date of birth: 14 April 1981 (age 45)
- Place of birth: Reggio Emilia, Italy
- Height: 1.81 m (5 ft 11 1/2 in)
- Position: Forward

Senior career*
Years	Team	Apps	(Gls)
1998–1999	Reggiana	2	(0)
1999–2003	Verona	19	(2)
2000–2001	→ Livorno (loan)	11	(1)
2001–2002	→ Triestina (loan	25	(5)
2003–2006	Arezzo	100	(43)
2006	→ Torino (loan)	18	(5)
2006–2007	Torino	29	(3)
2007–2008	Lecce	40	(15)
2008–2010	Torino	11	(1)
2009–2010	→ Chievo (loan)	15	(2)
2010–2012	Vicenza	42	(19)
2012–2013	Pescara	15	(2)
2013–2014	Cremonese	10	(3)
2014–2015	FeralpiSalò	15	(4)
2015	Fiorenzuola		

International career
2000	Italy U-20	1	(0)

Managerial career
- 2016: ViaEmilia
- 2016–2017: Arezzo (U19)
- * Club domestic league appearances and goals

Elvis Abbruscato (born 14 April 1981) is an Italian former professional footballer who played as a forward; he was a youth coach at Arezzo as of 2016–17 season.

== Club career ==
Abbruscato played for Arezzo, Torino, Chievo (loan), Vicenza Virtus, Pescara, Cremonese, and FeralpiSalò in his career.

=== Verona ===
After making his professional debut with his hometown club Reggiana, he joined Verona in 1999. He went on loan to Livorno and Triestina from 2000 to 2002. In July 2002 he was included in the pre-season camp of the first team of Verona, making his club debut during 2002–03 Serie B season.

=== Arezzo ===
In summer 2003 he was signed by Serie C1 club Arezzo on a co-ownership deal. On 22 June 2004 Arezzo signed Abbruscato outright from Verona.

=== Torino ===
In January 2006 Abbruscato was signed by Torino on a temporary basis, for €800,000 fee. In June 2006 he was signed outright for €3.6 million, on a four-year contract. However, in summer 2007 he was sold to Lecce on a co-ownership deal for €1.65 million. In June 2008, Torino bought back the 50% registration rights of Abbruscato from Lecce for €2 million.

In summer 2009, he left Turin again for Chievo on a temporary basis for free.

=== Vicenza ===
In summer 2010, Abbruscato was signed by Vicenza on a three-year contract for €1.2 million fee, as part of a swap that Alessandro Sgrigna went to Turin for €1.32 million.

=== Late career ===
In June 2012, Abbruscato was sold to Pescara from Vicenza for a cashless swap with Stefano Giacomelli. Both players were tagged for €2.3 million. Abbruscato signed a two-year contract.

However, Abbruscato was released at the end of season. He joined Cremonese on a free transfer.

In July 2014 he moved from Cremonese to join FeralpiSalò.

== Managerial career ==
Abbruscato became the head coach of Seconda Categoria team ViaEmilia in the second half of 2015–16 season. He was signed by Arezzo for their under-19 team on 19 July 2016.

In June 2017 he was enrolled in a course for UEFA A Licence.
