= Iacopo Balestri =

Italian footballer

Personal information
- Date of birth: 21 June 1975 (age 51)
- Place of birth: Pisa, Italy
- Height: 1.78 m (5 ft 10 in)
- Position: Defender

Youth career
- Pisa

Senior career*
Years	Team	Apps	(Gls)
1995–1997	Pisa	21	(0)
1997–1999	Castelfiorentino	61	(5)
1999–2000	Montevarchi	34	(0)
2000–2004	Modena	134	(3)
2004–2005	Reggina	38	(0)
2005–2007	Torino	70	(0)
2007–2009	Mantova	70	(0)
2010–2011	Salernitana	41	(0)
2012–2013	Ponsacco		
2013–2017	Signa 1914		
- * Club domestic league appearances and goals

Iacopo Balestri is an Italian former footballer who primarily played as a defender, He began his professional career with his hometown club, Pisa, before moving through various Italian teams during his career. He was known for his defensive skills and consistent performances across various Italian leagues.

== Career ==
Balestri started his career at hometown club Pisa, where he won the Serie D champion. After just played twice at Serie C2, he returned to Serie D for Castelfiorentino. In mid-1999 he moved to Montevarchi of Serie C1, where he was spotted by Modena. At Modena he won two promotion in two season, from Serie C1 to Serie A the Italian top division. At Serie A he was the regular starter in the two seasons. After Modena finished as the second least and relegated, Balestri was signed by another Serie A struggler Reggina. With Reggina, he played 37 out of possible 39 matches for the club and finished in mid-table. After played the first match of 2005–06 season, Torino of Serie B signed Balestri. He won promotion with club again, and secured a place in their Serie A campaign. In July 2007 he left for Serie B club Mantova, and continued to play as a regular.

Balestri was released in June 2009. After without a club for 6 months, he signed a 6 months contract with option of 1 more year with Serie B bottom club Salernitana.

== Honours ==
- Serie C1: 2001
- Serie D: 1996
