= 2002–03 Atalanta BC season =

Atalanta
2002–03 season
- Chairman: Ivan Ruggeri
- Manager: Giovanni Vavassori; Giancarlo Finardi
- Serie A: 15th
- Coppa Italia: Second Round
- Top goalscorer: League: Cristiano Doni (10); All: Cristiano Doni (10)

Atalanta BC lost its momentum it had built in its first two Serie A seasons in its stint, eventually being relegated following a playoff against Reggina. The championship was such competitive than Atalanta was only four points away from repeating its 9th place from the 2001-02 season, but instead had to face Serie B competition, losing key players such as Cristiano Doni, Luciano Zauri and Ousmane Dabo to bigger clubs.

== Squad ==
=== Goalkeepers ===
- (Italy) Massimo Taibi
- (Italy) Alex Calderoni

=== Defenders ===
- (Italy) Gianpaolo Bellini
- (Italy) Massimo Carrera
- (Brazil) Fabiano
- (Italy) Paolo Foglio
- (Italy) Natale Gonnella
- (Italy) Cesare Natali
- (Italy) Fabio Rustico
- (Italy) Luigi Sala
- (Italy) Sebastiano Siviglia
- (Italy) Paolo Tramezzani
- (Italy) Damiano Zenoni
- (Italy) Danilo Zini

=== Midfielders ===
- (Italy) Daniele Berretta
- (Italy) Yuri Breviario
- (France) Ousmane Dabo
- (Italy) Cristiano Doni
- (Dominican Republic) Vinicio Espinal
- (Croatia) Ivan Javorčić
- (Italy) Carmine Gautieri
- (Italy) Alex Pinardi
- (Italy) Luciano Zauri
- (Greece) Apostolos Liolidis

=== Attackers ===
- (Italy) Rolando Bianchi
- (Italy) Gianni Comandini
- (Brazil) Piá
- (France) Julien Rantier
- (Italy) Fausto Rossini
- (Italy) Luca Saudati
- (Croatia) Davor Vugrinec

== Competitions ==
=== Serie A ===
==== League table ====
Pos	Team	Pld	W	D	L	GF	GA	GD	Pts	Qualification or relegation
13	Empoli	34	9	11	14	36	46	−10	38 (Note: Modena finished ahead of Empoli, Atalanta and Reggina on head-to-head points: Modena: 10 pts, Empoli: 9 pts, Atalanta: 7 pts, Reggina: 5 pts.)	
14	Reggina	34	10	8	16	38	53	−15	38	Relegation tie-breaker
15	Atalanta (R)	34	8	14	12	35	47	−12	38	Serie B after tie-breaker (Note: Atalanta to 2003–04 Serie B after tie-breaker.)
16	Piacenza (R)	34	8	6	20	44	62	−18	30	Relegation to Serie B
17	Como (R)	34	4	12	18	29	57	−28	24	Relegation to Serie B

Source: 2002–03 Serie A, Soccerway
Rules for classification: 1) Points; 2) Head-to-head points; 3) Head-to-head goal difference; 4) Goal difference; 5) Goals scored; 6) Draw. (Note: Head-to-head record is used only after all the matches between the teams in question have been played).
(R) Relegated

==== Results summary ====
Overall								Home						Away					
Pld	W	D	L	GF	GA	GD	Pts	W	D	L	GF	GA	GD	W	D	L	GF	GA	GD
34	8	14	12	35	47	−12	38	5	8	4	20	21	−1	3	6	8	15	26	−11

==== Results by round ====
Round	1	2	3	4	5	6	7	8	9	10	11	12	13	14	15	16	17	18	19	20	21	22	23	24	25	26	27	28	29	30	31	32	33	34
Ground	H	A	H	A	H	H	A	H	A	H	A	H	A	A	H	A	H	A	H	A	H	A	A	H	A	H	A	H	A	H	H	A	H	A
Result	L	L	D	L	L	L	L	W	L	W	D	L	D	L	D	D	W	W	D	W	D	D	D	D	L	W	L	D	L	D	D	D	W	W
Position	16	17	16	17	18	18	18	18	18	15	15	15	15	15	15	15	14	14	15	13	13	14	15	14	15	14	15	15	15	15	14	14	14	15

A = Away; H = Home; W = Win; D = Draw; L = Loss

==== Score overview ====
Opposition	Home Score	Away Score	Double
Bologna	2–2	3–2	✗
Brescia	2–0	0–3	✗
Chievo Verona	1–0	1–4	✗
Como	2–1	1–1	✗
Empoli	2–2	0–0	✗
Internazionale	1–0	1–1	✗
Juventus	1–1	0–3	✗
Lazio	0–1	0–0	✗
Milan	1–4	3–3	✗
Modena	1–3	2–0	✗
Parma	0–0	1–2	✗
Perugia	0–2	0–1	✗
Piacenza	2–0	0–2	✗
Reggina	1–1	1–1	✗
Roma	2–1	2–1	✓
Torino	2–2	1–1	✗
Udinese	0–0	0–1	✗

==== Matches ====
15 September 2002 2	Juventus	3–0	Atalanta	Turin
15:00 CEST (UTC+02:00)	Del Piero 27' (pen.), 34'; Fresi 90+1'			Stadium: Stadio delle Alpi; Attendance: 38,315; Referee: Gianluca Paparesta

22 September 2002 3	Atalanta	2–2	Bologna	Bergamo
15:00 CEST (UTC+02:00)	Doni 18', 51' (pen.)		Locatelli 13'; C. Bellucci 77'	Stadium: Stadio Atleti Azzurri d'Italia; Attendance: 13,720; Referee: Alfredo Trentalange

29 September 2002 4	Udinese	1–0	Atalanta	Udine
15:00 CEST (UTC+02:00)	Sensini 60'			Stadium: Stadio Friuli; Attendance: 15,062; Referee: Diego Preschern

6 October 2002 5	Atalanta	0–1	Lazio	Bergamo
20:30 CEST (UTC+02:00)			César 24'	Stadium: Stadio Atleti Azzurri d'Italia; Attendance: 14,158; Referee: Fiorenzo Treossi

20 October 2002 6	Atalanta	1–4	Milan	Bergamo
15:00 CEST (UTC+02:00)	Sala 30'		Rivaldo 15'; Tomasson 41'; Pirlo 66' (pen.), 81'	Stadium: Stadio Atleti Azzurri d'Italia; Attendance: 23,628; Referee: Gianluca Paparesta

27 October 2002 7	Parma	2–1	Atalanta	Parma
15:00 CET (UTC+01:00)	Nakata 14'; Mutu 71'		Comandini 85'	Stadium: Stadio Ennio Tardini; Attendance: 13,476; Referee: Emilio Pellegrino

3 November 2002 8	Atalanta	2–0	Piacenza	Bergamo
15:00 CET (UTC+01:00)	Sala 78'; Comandini 88'			Stadium: Stadio Atleti Azzurri d'Italia; Attendance: 13,514; Referee: Cosimo Bolognino

6 November 2002 1	Atalanta	1–3	Modena	Bergamo
20:30 CET (UTC+01:00)	Dabo 90'		G. Colucci 13'; Kamara 39'; Mauri 76'	Stadium: Stadio Atleti Azzurri d'Italia; Attendance: 12,000; Referee: Paolo Dondarini

10 November 2002 9	Chievo	4–1	Atalanta	Verona
15:00 CET (UTC+01:00)	F. Cossato 45', 87'; D. Franceschini 56'; Perrotta 84'		Sala 40'	Stadium: Stadio Marcantonio Bentegodi; Attendance: 13,302; Referee: Emidio Morganti

17 November 2002 10	Atalanta	2–0	Brescia	Bergamo
15:00 CET (UTC+01:00)	Dabo 69'; Comandini 73'			Stadium: Stadio Atleti Azzurri d'Italia; Attendance: 14,000; Referee: Pierluigi Collina

24 November 2002 11	Reggina	1–1	Atalanta	Reggio Calabria
15:00 CET (UTC+01:00)	Savoldi 56'		Gautieri 34'	Stadium: Stadio Oreste Granillo; Attendance: 23,594; Referee: Paolo Dondarini

1 December 2002 12	Atalanta	0–2	Perugia	Bergamo
15:00 CET (UTC+01:00)			Miccoli 22'; Fusani 80'	Stadium: Stadio Atleti Azzurri d'Italia; Attendance: 13,133; Referee: Daniele Tombolini

15 December 2002 14	Internazionale	1–0	Atalanta	Milan
15:00 CET (UTC+01:00)	Kallon 70'			Stadium: San Siro; Attendance: 57,118; Referee: Paolo Bertini

22 December 2002 15	Atalanta	2–2	Empoli	Bergamo
15:00 CET (UTC+01:00)	Doni 13'; D. Zenoni 34'		Grieco 85'; Tavano 89'	Stadium: Stadio Atleti Azzurri d'Italia; Attendance: 13,338; Referee: Cosimo Bolognino

6 January 2003 13	Torino	1–1	Atalanta	Turin
15:00 CET (UTC+01:00)	Mezzano 60' (pen.)		Natali 13'	Stadium: Stadio delle Alpi; Attendance: 14,591; Referee: Daniele Tombolini
Note: This match was originally scheduled for 8 December 2002; however, it was rescheduled due to the death of Atalanta's doctor Walter Polini.

12 January 2003 16	Como	1–1	Atalanta	Reggio Emilia
15:00 CET (UTC+01:00)	Bjelanović 44'		Foglio 53'	Stadium: Stadio Giglio; Attendance: 6,529; Referee: Fiorenzo Treossi

19 January 2003 17	Atalanta	2–1	Roma	Bergamo
15:00 CET (UTC+01:00)	Doni 41'; Tramezzani 87'		Totti 9'	Stadium: Stadio Atleti Azzurri d'Italia; Attendance: 14,873; Referee: Alfredo Trentalange

25 January 2003 18	Modena	0–2	Atalanta	Modena
18:00 CET (UTC+01:00)			Dabo 35'; Pinardi 85'	Stadium: Stadio Alberto Braglia; Attendance: 14,473; Referee: Roberto Rosetti

2 February 2003 19	Atalanta	1–1	Juventus	Bergamo
15:00 CET (UTC+01:00)	Pinardi 40'		Di Vaio 51'	Stadium: Stadio Atleti Azzurri d'Italia; Attendance: 23,647; Referee: Emilio Pellegrino

9 February 2003 20	Bologna	2–3	Atalanta	Bologna
20:30 CET (UTC+01:00)	Signori 69' (pen.), 72' (pen.)		Pinardi 28', 49'; F. Rossini 90+4'	Stadium: Stadio Renato Dall'Ara; Attendance: 19,802; Referee: Gianluca Paparesta

16 February 2003 21	Atalanta	0–0	Udinese	Bergamo
15:00 CET (UTC+01:00)				Stadium: Stadio Atleti Azzurri d'Italia; Attendance: 13,305; Referee: Emidio Morganti

23 February 2003 22	Lazio	0–0	Atalanta	Rome
15:00 CET (UTC+01:00)				Stadium: Stadio Olimpico; Attendance: 33,611; Referee: Daniele Tombolini

2 March 2003 23	Milan	3–3	Atalanta	Milan
15:00 CET (UTC+01:00)	F. Inzaghi 34', 79'; Tomasson 70'		Maldini 1' (o.g.); F. Rossini 29', 31'	Stadium: San Siro; Attendance: 60,095; Referee: Stefano Farina

9 March 2003 24	Atalanta	0–0	Parma	Bergamo
15:00 CET (UTC+01:00)				Stadium: Stadio Atleti Azzurri d'Italia; Attendance: 14,994; Referee: Roberto Rosetti

16 March 2003 25	Piacenza	2–0	Atalanta	Piacenza
15:00 CET (UTC+01:00)	Hübner 41'; De Cesare 89'			Stadium: Stadio Leonardo Garilli; Attendance: 8,977; Referee: Stefano Farina

23 March 2003 26	Atalanta	1–0	Chievo	Bergamo
15:00 CET (UTC+01:00)	Dabo 52'			Stadium: Stadio Atleti Azzurri d'Italia; Attendance: 14,796; Referee: Pierluigi Collina

6 April 2003 27	Brescia	3–0	Atalanta	Brescia
15:00 CEST (UTC+02:00)	Appiah 3'; R. Baggio 45'; Petruzzi 85'			Stadium: Stadio Mario Rigamonti; Attendance: 20,025; Referee: Emilio Pellegrino

13 April 2003 28	Atalanta	1–1	Reggina	Bergamo
15:00 CEST (UTC+02:00)	Doni 9'		Bonazzoli 52'	Stadium: Stadio Atleti Azzurri d'Italia; Attendance: 16,758; Referee: Cosimo Bolognino

19 April 2003 29	Perugia	1–0	Atalanta	Perugia
15:00 CEST (UTC+02:00)	Pagliuca 78'			Stadium: Stadio Renato Curi; Attendance: 7,208; Referee: Massimo De Santis

26 April 2003 30	Atalanta	2–2	Torino	Bergamo
18:00 CEST (UTC+02:00)	Doni 75', 90+2' (pen.)		Donati 22', 89'	Stadium: Stadio Atleti Azzurri d'Italia; Attendance: 15,471; Referee: Luca Palanca

3 May 2003 31	Atalanta	1–1	Internazionale	Bergamo
15:00 CEST (UTC+02:00)	Gautieri 71'		Martins 13'	Stadium: Stadio Atleti Azzurri d'Italia; Attendance: 17,864; Referee: Daniele Tombolini

10 May 2003 32	Empoli	0–0	Atalanta	Empoli
15:00 CEST (UTC+02:00)				Stadium: Stadio Carlo Castellani; Attendance: 10,043; Referee: Alfredo Trentalange

17 May 2003 33	Atalanta	2–1	Como	Bergamo
15:00 CEST (UTC+02:00)	Doni 63' (pen.), 81'		Caccia 17'	Stadium: Stadio Atleti Azzurri d'Italia; Attendance: 14,014; Referee: Massimo De Santis

24 May 2003 34	Roma	1–2	Atalanta	Rome
15:00 CEST (UTC+02:00)	De Rossi 30'		Doni 27'; Gautieri 55'	Stadium: Stadio Olimpico; Attendance: 52,547; Referee: Emilio Pellegrino

=== Relegation play-offs ===
29 May 2003 First leg	Reggina	0–0	Atalanta	Reggio Calabria
20:30 CEST (UTC+02:00)				Stadium: Stadio Oreste Granillo; Attendance: 27,000; Referee: Massimo De Santis

2 June 2003 Second leg	Atalanta	1–2 (1–2 agg.)	Reggina	Bergamo
18:00 CEST (UTC+02:00)	Natali 18'		Cozza 33'; Bonazzoli 85'	Stadium: Stadio Atleti Azzurri d'Italia; Attendance: 25,000; Referee: Pierluigi Collina

=== Topscorers ===
- (Italy) Cristiano Doni 10
- (Italy) Alex Pinardi 4
- (Italy) Fausto Rossini 3
- (Italy) Gianni Comandini 3
- (Italy) Luigi Sala 3

=== Coppa Italia ===
==== Knockout stage ====
===== Round of 32 =====
25 September 2002 First leg	Sampdoria	1–0	Atalanta	Genoa
18:00 CEST (UTC+02:00)	Colombo 62'			Stadium: Stadio Luigi Ferraris; Attendance: 3,981; Referee: Roberto Rosetti

10 October 2002 Second leg	Atalanta	1–1 (1–2 agg.)	Sampdoria	Bergamo
15:30 CEST (UTC+02:00)	Comandini 53'		Iacopino 14' (pen.)	Stadium: Stadio Atleti Azzurri d'Italia; Attendance: 2,500; Referee: Emidio Morganti
