= 2000–01 Atalanta BC season =

Atalanta
2000–01 season
- Chairman: Ivan Ruggeri
- Manager: Giovanni Vavassori
- Stadium: Stadio Atleti Azzurri d'Italia
- Serie A: 7th
- Coppa Italia: Quarter-finals
- Top goalscorer: League: Nicola Ventola (10); All: Nicola Ventola (11)
- Average home league attendance: 18,663

Atalanta BC returned to Serie A following a two-year absence, and immediately established itself on the top half of the table, finishing in 7th place. Coach Giovanni Vavassori was hailed as the main contributor to the success, having come from the youth side a couple of years before, first promoting the club, and then having such a successful inaugural Serie A campaign. Inter-owned Nicola Ventola scored ten league goals, enough to persuade Inter to take him back, and playmaker Cristiano Doni got his proper breakthrough as well. Experienced Massimo Carrera held the defence together, and was also widely praised, while goalkeeper Ivan Pelizzoli was signed by champions Roma.

== Players ==
=== First-team squad ===
As of 22 April 2021

Note: Flags indicate national team as defined under FIFA eligibility rules; some limited exceptions apply. Players may hold more than one non-FIFA nationality.

No.	Pos.	Nation	Player
2	DF	(Italy) ITA	Fabio Rustico
3	MF	(Italy) ITA	Domenico Morfeo (on loan from Fiorentina)
4	DF	(Italy) ITA	Massimo Paganin
5	MF	(Federal Republic of Yugoslavia) YUG	Ljubisa Dundjerski
6	DF	(Italy) ITA	Fabio Gallo
7	FW	(Italy) ITA	Marco Nappi
8	DF	(Italy) ITA	Luciano Zauri
9	FW	(Italy) ITA	Fausto Rossini
10	FW	(Italy) ITA	Nicola Ventola (on loan from Inter)
11	FW	(Italy) ITA	Maurizio Ganz (on loan from Milan)
12	GK	(Italy) ITA	Davide Pinato
15	DF	(Italy) ITA	Stefano Lorenzi
16	FW	(Dominican Republic) DOM	José Espinal
17	DF	(Italy) ITA	Mauro Minelli
18	MF	(Dominican Republic) DOM	Vinicio Espinal
19	DF	(Italy) ITA	Damiano Zenoni

No.	Pos.	Nation	Player
20	DF	(Italy) ITA	Massimo Carrera (captain)
21	MF	(Italy) ITA	Alex Pinardi
22	GK	(Italy) ITA	Ivan Pelizzoli
24	DF	(Italy) ITA	Sebastiano Siviglia
25	FW	(Brazil) BRA	Piá
26	DF	(Italy) ITA	Cristian Zenoni
27	MF	(Italy) ITA	Cristiano Doni
28	MF	(Italy) ITA	Daniele Berretta
30	DF	(Italy) ITA	Gianpaolo Bellini
31	DF	(Italy) ITA	Sergio Carnesalini
32	GK	(Italy) ITA	Matteo Gritti
33	MF	(Italy) ITA	Roberto Previtali
36	DF	(Australia) AUS	Adrian Madaschi
37	FW	(Italy) ITA	Biagio Pagano
38	FW	(Italy) ITA	Rolando Bianchi

== Transfers ==
=== In ===
No.	Pos.	Nat.	Name	Age	Moving from	Type	Transfer window	Ends	Transfer fee	Source
11	FW	(Italy)	Maurizio Ganz	31	Milan	Loan	Summer	July 1, 2001		[
4	DF	(Italy)	Massimo Paganin	29	Bologna	Transfer	Summer		free	
10	FW	(Italy)	Nicola Ventola	22	Inter	Loan	Summer	June 30, 2001		
28	MF	(Italy)	Daniele Berretta	28	Cagliari	Transfer	Winter		Undisclosed	

Last updated: 7 June 2019

=== Out ===
No.	Pos.	Nat.	Name	Age	Moving to	Type	Transfer window	Transfer fee	Source
11	FW	(Argentina)	Claudio Caniggia	33	Dundee (Scotland)	Transfer	Summer	free	
10	FW	(Italy)	Nicola Caccia	30	Piacenza	Transfer	Summer	free	

Last updated: 30 January 2020

== Competitions ==
=== Overview ===
Competition	First match	Last match	Starting round	Final position	Record							
Competition	First match	Last match	Starting round	Final position	Pld	W	D	L	GF	GA	GD	Win %
Serie A	1 September 2000	16 June 2001	Matchday 1	Matchday 34	34	10	14	10	38	34	+4	29.41
Coppa Italia	12 August 2000	13 December 2000	Group stage	Quarter-finals	9	6	2	1	17	10	+7	66.67
Total					43	16	16	11	55	44	+11	37.21

Last updated: 22 April 2021

=== Serie A ===
==== League table ====
Pos	Team	Pld	W	D	L	GF	GA	GD	Pts	Qualification or relegation
5	Internazionale	34	14	9	11	47	47	0	51	Qualification to UEFA Cup first round
6	Milan	34	12	13	9	56	46	+10	49	Qualification to UEFA Cup first round
7	Atalanta	34	10	14	10	38	34	+4	44 (Note: Atalanta finished ahead of Brescia on head-to-head points: Atalanta 2–0 Brescia, Brescia 0–3 Atalanta.)	
8	Brescia (Note: Brescia gained entry to the 2001 UEFA Intertoto Cup after Atalanta declined.)	34	10	14	10	44	42	+2	44	Qualification to Intertoto Cup third round
9	Fiorentina (Note: Fiorentina gained entry to the 2001–02 UEFA Cup as the 2000–01 Coppa Italia champions.)	34	10	13	11	53	52	+1	43	Qualification to UEFA Cup first round

Source: 2000–01 Serie A, Soccerway, RSSSF.com
Rules for classification: 1) Points; 2) Head-to-head points; 3) Head-to-head goal difference; 4) Goal difference; 5) Goals scored; 6) Draw. (Note: Head-to-head record is used only after all the matches between the teams in question have been played).

==== Results summary ====
Overall								Home						Away					
Pld	W	D	L	GF	GA	GD	Pts	W	D	L	GF	GA	GD	W	D	L	GF	GA	GD
34	10	14	10	38	34	+4	44	4	9	4	16	14	+2	6	5	6	22	20	+2

==== Results by round ====
Round	1	2	3	4	5	6	7	8	9	10	11	12	13	14	15	16	17	18	19	20	21	22	23	24	25	26	27	28	29	30	31	32	33	34
Ground	H	A	A	H	A	H	A	H	A	H	A	H	H	A	H	A	H	A	H	H	A	H	A	H	A	H	A	H	A	A	H	A	H	A
Result	D	W	W	W	D	W	D	W	L	D	W	L	L	L	D	W	W	D	D	D	L	D	W	D	W	L	D	D	L	L	D	D	L	L
Position	9	6	4	2	3	2	3	2	2	2	3	3	3	5	5	4	4	4	4	5	5	5	5	6	5	5	7	6	7	7	7	7	7	7

Source: Serie A
A = Away; H = Home; W = Win; D = Draw; L = Loss

==== Matches ====
1 October 2000 1	Atalanta	2–2	Lazio	Bergamo
20:30 CEST (UTC+02:00)	Pancaro 21' (o.g.); Zenoni 66'		Mihajlović 3'; Inzaghi 73'	Stadium: Stadio Atleti Azzurri d'Italia; Attendance: 18,443; Referee: Alfredo Trentalange

15 October 2000 2	Vicenza	1–2	Atalanta	Vicenza
15:00 CEST (UTC+02:00)	Toni 52'		Doni 67'; Rossini 80'	Stadium: Stadio Romeo Menti; Attendance: 13,937; Referee: Stefano Farina

22 October 2000 3	Bari	0–2	Atalanta	Bari
15:00 CEST (UTC+02:00)	Andersson (penalty missed) 72' (penalty missed) 84'; Osmanovski (red card) 90+3'		Rossini 50'; Ventola 55'	Stadium: Stadio San Nicola; Attendance: 11,154; Referee: Stefano Cassarà

1 November 2000 4	Atalanta	3–0	Hellas Verona	Bergamo
15:00 CET (UTC+01:00)	Rossini 38'; Zenoni 44'; Ventola 90+2'			Stadium: Stadio Atleti Azzurri d'Italia; Attendance: 19,824; Referee: Pasquale Rodomonti

5 November 2000 5	Milan	3–3	Atalanta	Milan
15:00 CET (UTC+01:00)	Serginho 23'; Bierhoff 49'; Shevchenko 64' (pen.)		Doni 23', 44' (pen.); Rossini 45'	Stadium: San Siro; Attendance: 54,641; Referee: Roberto Rosetti

11 November 2000 6	Atalanta	2–0	Brescia	Bergamo
15:00 CET (UTC+01:00)	Donati 16'; Ventola 90+3'			Stadium: Stadio Atleti Azzurri d'Italia; Attendance: 21,255; Referee: Graziano Cesari

19 November 2000 7	Napoli	0–0	Atalanta	Naples
15:00 CET (UTC+01:00)				Stadium: Stadio San Paolo; Attendance: 29,495; Referee: Emilio Pellegrino

25 November 2000 8	Atalanta	1–0	Lecce	Bergamo
15:00 CET (UTC+01:00)	Ganz 45' (penalty missed) 85'			Stadium: Stadio Atleti Azzurri d'Italia; Attendance: 16,088; Referee: Gianluca Paparesta

2 December 2000 9	Parma	2–0	Atalanta	Parma
20:30 CET (UTC+01:00)	Lamouchi 19'; Conçeicão 83'			Stadium: Stadio Ennio Tardini; Attendance: 18,600; Referee: Nicola Ayroldi

10 December 2000 10	Atalanta	0–0	Perugia	Bergamo
15:00 CET (UTC+01:00)				Stadium: Stadio Atleti Azzurri d'Italia; Attendance: 16,740; Referee: Stefano Cassarà

17 December 2000 11	Bologna	0–1	Atalanta	Bologna
15:00 CET (UTC+01:00)			Ganz 84'	Stadium: Stadio Renato Dall'Ara; Attendance: 23,474; Referee: Massimiliano Saccani

23 December 2000 12	Atalanta	0–1	Internazionale	Bergamo
15:00 CET (UTC+01:00)			Seedorf 65'	Stadium: Stadio Atleti Azzurri d'Italia; Attendance: 23,643; Referee: Stefano Farina

7 January 2001 13	Atalanta	0–2	Roma	Bergamo
15:00 CET (UTC+01:00)			Delvecchio 1'; Tommasi 41'; Zanetti (yellow card) ?' (yellow-red card) 67'	Stadium: Stadio Atleti Azzurri d'Italia; Attendance: 26,000; Referee: Roberto Rosetti

14 January 2001 14	Reggina	1–0	Atalanta	Reggio Calabria
15:00 CET (UTC+01:00)	Dionigi 22'			Stadium: Stadio Oreste Granillo; Attendance: 23,679; Referee: Pierluigi Collina

21 January 2001 15	Atalanta	0–0	Fiorentina	Bergamo
15:00 CET (UTC+01:00)				Stadium: Stadio Atleti Azzurri d'Italia; Attendance: 24,000; Referee: Diego Preschern

28 January 2001 16	Udinese	2–4	Atalanta	Udine
20:30 CET (UTC+01:00)	Sottil 33'; Gargo 76'		Ventola 2', 20'; Morfeo 4', 41'	Stadium: Stadio Friuli; Attendance: 17,583; Referee: Emilio Pellegrino

3 February 2001 17	Atalanta	2–1	Juventus	Bergamo
20:30 CET (UTC+01:00)	Lorenzi 75'; Ventola 82'		Paganin 73' (o.g.)	Stadium: Stadio Atleti Azzurri d'Italia; Attendance: 24,000; Referee: Massimo De Santis

10 February 2001 18	Lazio	0–0	Atalanta	Rome
15:00 CET (UTC+01:00)				Stadium: Stadio Olimpico; Attendance: 42,000; Referee: Pierluigi Collina

18 February 2001 19	Atalanta	1–1	Vicenza	Bergamo
15:00 CET (UTC+01:00)	Ventola 41'		Sommese 73'	Stadium: Stadio Atleti Azzurri d'Italia; Attendance: 16,900; Referee: Nicola Ayroldi

24 February 2001 20	Atalanta	0–0	Bari	Bergamo
20:30 CET (UTC+01:00)				Stadium: Stadio Atleti Azzurri d'Italia; Attendance: 14,603; Referee: Cosimo Bolognino

4 March 2001 21	Hellas Verona	2–1	Atalanta	Verona
15:00 CET (UTC+01:00)	Salvetti 11', 90'; Mutu (red card) 90+1'		Doni 42'	Stadium: Stadio Marcantonio Bentegodi; Attendance: 13,700; Referee: Diego Preschern

10 March 2001 22	Atalanta	1–1	Milan	Bergamo
20:30 CET (UTC+01:00)	Ganz 63'		Lorenzi 24' (o.g.)	Stadium: Stadio Atleti Azzurri d'Italia; Attendance: 20,000; Referee: Pasquale Rodomonti

19 March 2001 23	Brescia	0–3	Atalanta	Brescia
15:00 CET (UTC+01:00)			Ganz 11', 63'; Hübner 44' (o.g.)	Stadium: Stadio Mario Rigamonti; Attendance: 5,000; Referee: Stefano Braschi

1 April 2001 24	Atalanta	1–1	Napoli	Bergamo
15:00 CEST (UTC+02:00)	Doni 69' (pen.)		Pecchia 38'	Stadium: Stadio Atleti Azzurri d'Italia; Attendance: 17,704; Referee: Pasquale Rodomonti

8 April 2001 25	Lecce	0–2	Atalanta	Lecce
15:00 CEST (UTC+02:00)			Ventola 69'; Morfeo 79'	Stadium: Stadio Via del Mare; Attendance: 12,324; Referee: Massimiliano Saccani

14 April 2001 26	Atalanta	0–1	Parma	Bergamo
15:00 CEST (UTC+02:00)			Milošević 28'	Stadium: Stadio Atleti Azzurri d'Italia; Attendance: 18,000; Referee: Gianluca Paparesta

22 April 2001 27	Perugia	2–2	Atalanta	Perugia
15:00 CEST (UTC+02:00)	Tedesco 34'; Ahn 90+5'		Ventola 25'; Doni 70' (pen.)	Stadium: Stadio Renato Curi; Attendance: 6,286; Referee: Roberto Rosetti

29 April 2001 28	Atalanta	2–2	Bologna	Bergamo
15:00 CEST (UTC+02:00)	Ventola 48'; Morfeo 67'		Signori 58', 75'	Stadium: Stadio Atleti Azzurri d'Italia; Attendance: 16,276; Referee: Paolo Bertini

6 May 2001 29	Internazionale	3–0	Atalanta	Milan
15:00 CEST (UTC+02:00)	Vieri 6', 10'; Recoba 35'			Stadium: San Siro; Attendance: 56,930; Referee: Graziano Cesari

12 May 2001 30	Roma	1–0	Atalanta	Rome
15:00 CEST (UTC+02:00)	Montella 63'			Stadium: Stadio Olimpico; Attendance: 64,013; Referee: Fiorenzo Treossi

19 May 2001 31	Atalanta	1–1	Reggina	Bergamo
15:00 CEST (UTC+02:00)	Zauri 11'; Nappi (penalty missed) 90+5'		Zanchetta 16'	Stadium: Stadio Atleti Azzurri d'Italia; Attendance: 15,000; Referee: Massimo De Santis

27 May 2001 32	Fiorentina	1–1	Atalanta	Florence
20:30 CEST (UTC+02:00)	Gomes 13'		Doni 20' (pen.)	Stadium: Stadio Artemio Franchi; Attendance: 25,686; Referee: Alfredo Trentalange

9 June 2001 33	Atalanta	0–1	Udinese	Bergamo
15:00 CEST (UTC+02:00)			Muzzi 31'	Stadium: Stadio Atleti Azzurri d'Italia; Attendance: 15,793; Referee: Daniele Tombolini

16 June 2001 34	Juventus	2–1	Atalanta	Turin
15:00 CEST (UTC+02:00)	Trezeguet 6'; Tacchinardi 64'		Nappi 78'	Stadium: Stadio delle Alpi; Attendance: 45,000; Referee: Cosimo Bolognino

=== Coppa Italia ===
==== Group stage ====
Pos	Team	Pld	W	D	L	GF	GA	GD	Pts	Qualification
1	Atalanta	3	2	1	0	5	2	+3	7	Advance to knockout phase
2	Pistoiese	3	1	1	1	4	6	−2	4	
3	Ravenna	3	1	0	2	5	5	0	3	
4	Avellino	3	1	0	2	7	8	−1	3	

12 August 2000 1	Avellino	1–3	Atalanta	Avellino
20:30 CEST (UTC+02:00)	Piccioni 46'; Cardinale (red card) 68'		Ganz 14'; Ventola 38'; Paganin (red card) 42'; Doni 71'	Stadium: Stadio Partenio; Attendance: 5,566; Referee: Stefano Cassarà

16 August 2000 2	Atalanta	1–0	Ravenna	Bergamo
20:30 CEST (UTC+02:00)	Doni 31' (pen.)			Stadium: Stadio Atleti Azzurri d'Italia; Attendance: 5,746; Referee: Diego Preschern

20 August 2000 3	Atalanta	1–1	Pistoiese	Bergamo
20:45 CEST (UTC+02:00)	Zauri 45'		Bizzarri 87'	Stadium: Stadio Atleti Azzurri d'Italia; Attendance: 6,194; Referee: Angelo Bonfrisco

==== Knockout stage ====
===== Round of 32 =====
27 August 2000 First leg	Atalanta	2–0	Reggina	Bergamo
20:45 CEST (UTC+02:00)	Rossini 41'; Donati 63'			Stadium: Stadio Atleti Azzurri d'Italia; Attendance: 6,631; Referee: Tarcisio Serena

6 September 2000 Second leg	Reggina	0–1 (0–3 agg.)	Atalanta	Reggio Calabria
20:45 CEST (UTC+02:00)	Franceschini (red card) 87'		Zenoni 79'	Stadium: Stadio Oreste Granillo; Attendance: 15,405; Referee: Gianluca Paparesta

===== Round of 16 =====
17 September 2000 First leg	Roma	1–1	Atalanta	Rome
21:00 CEST (UTC+02:00)	Montella 25'		Bellini 48'	Stadium: Stadio Olimpico; Attendance: 21,671; Referee: Emilio Pellegrino

22 September 2000 Second leg	Atalanta	4–2 (5–3 agg.)	Roma	Bergamo
21:00 CEST (UTC+02:00)	Ganz 9', 56'; Bellini 63'; Pinardi 90+3'		Montella 20'; Totti 90+1' (pen.)	Stadium: Stadio Atleti Azzurri d'Italia; Attendance: 10,891; Referee: Pierluigi Collina

===== Quarter-finals =====
28 November 2000 First leg	Milan	4–2	Atalanta	Milan
21:00 CET (UTC+01:00)	Leonardo 31', 65'; Mari 55' (pen.); Shevchenko 88'		Ganz 20'; Nappi 46' (pen.)	Stadium: San Siro; Attendance: 6,112; Referee: Emilio Pellegrino

13 December 2000 Second leg	Atalanta	2–1 (4–5 agg.)	Milan	Bergamo
21:00 CET (UTC+01:00)	Nappi 14'; Doni (penalty missed) 29' 90'; Ventola (penalty missed) 83'		Boban 20'; Roque Júnior (red card) 87'	Stadium: Stadio Atleti Azzurri d'Italia; Attendance: 10,891; Referee: Pierluigi Collina

== Statistics ==
=== Appearances and goals ===
No.	Pos	Nat	Player	Total		Serie A		Coppa Italia	
No.	Pos	Nat	Player	Apps	Goals	Apps	Goals	Apps	Goals
22	GK	(Italy) ITA	Pelizzoli	38	-31	30+1	-31	7	0
4	DF	(Italy) ITA	Paganin	32	0	25	0	7	0
20	DF	(Italy) ITA	Carrera	40	0	32	0	8	0
26	DF	(Italy) ITA	Zenoni	44	2	34	1	9+1	1
24	DF	(Italy) ITA	Siviglia	36	0	26	0	7+3	0
19	MF	(Italy) ITA	Zenoni	35	1	27	1	7+1	0
8	MF	(Italy) ITA	Zauri	35	2	27	1	8	1
29	MF	(Italy) ITA	Donati	34	1	21+5	0	7+1	1
27	MF	(Italy) ITA	Doni	34	10	27	7	7	3
3	AM	(Italy) ITA	Morfeo	17	5	17	5	0	0
10	FW	(Italy) ITA	Ventola	32	11	22+6	10	4	1
12	GK	(Italy) ITA	Pinato	6	-1	4	-1	2	0
9	FW	(Italy) ITA	Rossini	25	5	15+3	4	6+1	1
11	FW	(Italy) ITA	Ganz	33	9	14+10	5	7+2	4
28	MF	(Italy) ITA	Berretta	16	1	13+3	1	0	0
30	DF	(Italy) ITA	Bellini	29	2	12+11	0	6	2
15	DF	(Italy) ITA	Lorenzi	21	1	8+8	1	3+2	0
5	MF	(Federal Republic of Yugoslavia) YUG	Dundjerski	18	0	6+6	0	4+2	0
7	FW	(Italy) ITA	Nappi	24	3	2+13	1	6+3	2
21	MF	(Italy) ITA	Pinardi	24	1	5+6	0	8+5	1
2	DF	(Italy) ITA	Rustico	6	0	2+1	0	2+1	0
6	MF	(Italy) ITA	Gallo	11	0	1+1	0	7+2	0
16	FW	(Dominican Republic) DOM	Espinal	1	0	0+1	0	0	0
18	MF	(Dominican Republic) DOM	Espinal	4	0	2	0	1+1	0
37	FW	(Italy) ITA	Pagano	1	0	0+1	0	0	0
38	FW	(Italy) ITA	Bianchi	1	0	0+1	0	0	0
33	MF	(Italy) ITA	Previtali	1	0	1	0	0	0
23	DF	(Italy) ITA	Natali	1	0	0	0	1	0
32	GK	(Italy) ITA	Gritti	0	0	0	0	0	0
13	DF	(Italy) ITA	Regonesi	0	0	0	0	0	0
17	DF	(Italy) ITA	Minelli	0	0	0	0	0	0
31	DF	(Italy) ITA	Carnesalini	0	0	0	0	0	0
34	MF	(Italy) ITA	Raimondi	0	0	0	0	0	0
25	FW	(Brazil) BRA	Piá	0	0	0	0	0	0
Players transferred out during the season
1	GK	(Italy) ITA	Alberto Fontana	1	-2	1	-2	0	0
3	DF	(Italy) ITA	Zini	0	0	0	0	0	0
28	MF	(Italy) ITA	Pontarolla	0	0	0	0	0	0
33	FW	(Italy) ITA	Banchelli	1	0	0+1	0	0	0

Last updated: 18 April 2021
Source: http://calcio-seriea.net/presenze/2000/1178/

=== Goalscorers ===
As of 18 April 2021

Rank	No.	Pos	Nat	Name	Serie A	Coppa Italia	Total
1	10	FW	(Italy)	Nicola Ventola	10	1	11
2	27	MF	(Italy)	Cristiano Doni	7	3	10
3	11	FW	(Italy)	Maurizio Ganz	5	4	9
4	9	FW	(Italy)	Fausto Rossini	4	1	5
4	3	MF	(Italy)	Domenico Morfeo	5	0	5
6	7	FW	(Italy)	Marco Nappi	1	2	3
7	26	DF	(Italy)	Cristian Zenoni	1	1	2
7	30	DF	(Italy)	Gianpaolo Bellini	0	2	2
7	8	DF	(Italy)	Luciano Zauri	1	1	2
7	29	MF	(Italy)	Massimo Donati	1	1	2
11	15	DF	(Italy)	Stefano Lorenzi	1	0	1
11	21	MF	(Italy)	Alex Pinardi	0	1	1
11	19	DF	(Italy)	Damiano Zenoni	1	0	1
Totals					37	17	54
