= 2001–02 Atalanta BC season =

Atalanta
2001–02 season
- Chairman: Ivan Ruggeri
- Manager: Giovanni Vavassori
- Serie A: 9th
- Coppa Italia: Quarter-finals
- Top goalscorer: League: Cristiano Doni (16); All: Cristiano Doni (16)
- Average home league attendance: 16,522

Atalanta BC continued to be a midfield team in a competitive Serie A season, in which it dropped two places in spite of recording more points than during its 7th placed season the year before. Cristiano Doni was the most influential player, the playmaker scoring 16 goals, and surprisingly stayed on at Atalanta for a further season. Luciano Zauri also got his breakthrough, earning his first national team cap during the course of the season.

== Squad ==
=== Goalkeepers ===
- (Italy) Massimo Taibi
- (Italy) Alex Calderoni
- (Italy) Davide Pinato

=== Defenders ===
- (Italy) Gianpaolo Bellini
- (Italy) Massimo Carrera
- (Italy) Gianluca Falsini
- (Italy) Paolo Foglio
- (Italy) Cesare Natali
- (Italy) Massimo Paganin
- (Italy) Fabio Rustico
- (Italy) Luigi Sala
- (Italy) Damiano Zenoni

=== Midfielders ===
- (Italy) Daniele Berretta
- (Italy) Yuri Breviaro
- (Italy) Luca Cavalli
- (France) Ousmane Dabo
- (Italy) Cristiano Doni
- (Dominican Republic) Vinicio Espinal
- (Italy) Pierluigi Orlandini
- (Italy) Alex Pinardi
- (Italy) Luciano Zauri
- (Brazil) Fabiano

=== Attackers ===
- (Italy) Rolando Bianchi
- (Italy) Corrado Colombo
- (Italy) Gianni Comandini
- (Brazil) Piá
- (Italy) Fausto Rossini
- (Italy) Luca Saudati
- (Italy) Alessandro Rinaldi

== Competitions ==
=== Serie A ===
==== League table ====
Pos	Team	Pld	W	D	L	GF	GA	GD	Pts	Qualification or relegation
7	Bologna	34	15	7	12	40	40	0	52	Qualification to Intertoto Cup third round
8	Perugia	34	13	7	14	38	46	−8	46	Qualification to Intertoto Cup third round
9	Atalanta	34	12	9	13	41	50	−9	45	
10	Parma (Note: Parma gained entry to the 2002–03 UEFA Cup as the 2001–02 Coppa Italia champions.)	34	12	8	14	43	47	−4	44	Qualification to UEFA Cup first round
11	Torino (Note: Torino gained entry to the 2002 UEFA Intertoto Cup after Atalanta declined to take part.)	34	10	13	11	37	39	−2	43	Qualification to Intertoto Cup second round

Source: 2001–02 Serie A, Soccerway
Rules for classification: 1) Points; 2) Head-to-head points; 3) Head-to-head goal difference; 4) Goal difference; 5) Goals scored; 6) Draw. (Note: Head-to-head record is used only after all the matches between the teams in question have been played).

==== Results summary ====
Overall								Home						Away					
Pld	W	D	L	GF	GA	GD	Pts	W	D	L	GF	GA	GD	W	D	L	GF	GA	GD
34	12	9	13	41	50	−9	45	6	6	5	22	23	−1	6	3	8	19	27	−8

==== Results by round ====
Round	1	2	3	4	5	6	7	8	9	10	11	12	13	14	15	16	17	18	19	20	21	22	23	24	25	26	27	28	29	30	31	32	33	34
Ground	A	H	A	H	A	H	A	H	A	H	H	A	H	A	H	A	H	H	A	H	A	H	A	H	A	H	A	A	H	A	H	A	H	A
Result	L	L	L	W	D	D	L	L	W	D	W	W	L	W	W	L	L	D	L	W	L	D	D	L	W	W	L	W	D	W	D	D	W	L
Position	15	16	17	15	16	15	17	17	17	17	15	12	13	12	10	10	11	10	13	12	12	13	14	14	12	11	11	10	10	9	9	10	8	9

A = Away; H = Home; W = Win; D = Draw; L = Loss

==== Matches ====
25 August 2001 1	Bologna	1–0	Atalanta	Bologna
20:30 CEST (UTC+02:00)	Signori 19'			Stadium: Stadio Renato Dall'Ara; Attendance: 22,070; Referee: Roberto Rosetti

9 September 2001 2	Atalanta	0–2	Juventus	Bergamo
15:00 CEST (UTC+02:00)			Del Piero 8'; Trézéguet 83'	Stadium: Stadio Atleti Azzurri d'Italia; Attendance: 24,386; Referee: Gennaro Borriello

16 September 2001 3	Fiorentina	3–1	Atalanta	Florence
15:15 CEST (UTC+02:00)	Nuno Gomes 2'; Chiesa 12', 81'		Rinaldi 3'	Stadium: Stadio Artemio Franchi; Attendance: 13,815; Referee: Tiziano Pieri

23 September 2001 4	Atalanta	1–0	Hellas Verona	Bergamo
15:00 CEST (UTC+02:00)	Doni 27'			Stadium: Stadio Atleti Azzurri d'Italia; Attendance: 13,305; Referee: Gianluca Paparesta

30 September 2001 5	Brescia	3–3	Atalanta	Brescia
15:00 CEST (UTC+02:00)	Baggio 25', 75', 90+2'		Sala 28'; Doni 30'; Comandini 45'	Stadium: Stadio Mario Rigamonti; Attendance: 14,423; Referee: Pierluigi Collina

13 October 2001 7	Lazio	2–0	Atalanta	Rome
15:00 CEST (UTC+02:00)	López 42'; Couto 71'			Stadium: Stadio Olimpico; Attendance: 36,368; Referee: Paolo Bertini

21 October 2001 8	Atalanta	1–5	Udinese	Bergamo
15:00 CEST (UTC+02:00)	Doni 57'		Jørgensen 5', 62'; Iaquinta 76'; Muzzi 81', 86' (pen.)	Stadium: Stadio Atleti Azzurri d'Italia; Attendance: 14,302; Referee: Matteo Trefoloni

28 October 2001 9	Lecce	0–2	Atalanta	Lecce
15:00 CET (UTC+01:00)			Rossini 4'; Doni 82'	Stadium: Stadio Via del Mare; Attendance: 12,568; Referee: Paolo Bertini

4 November 2001 10	Atalanta	1–1	Roma	Bergamo
15:00 CET (UTC+01:00)	Doni 75' (pen.)		Assunção 54'	Stadium: Stadio Atleti Azzurri d'Italia; Attendance: 17,705; Referee: Gennaro Borriello

11 November 2001 11	Atalanta	1–0	Venezia	Bergamo
15:00 CET (UTC+01:00)	Rossini 30'			Stadium: Stadio Atleti Azzurri d'Italia; Attendance: 15,141; Referee: Mario Palmieri

25 November 2001 12	Piacenza	1–2	Atalanta	Piacenza
15:00 CET (UTC+01:00)	Hübner 8' (pen.)		Doni 59', 82'	Stadium: Stadio Leonardo Garilli; Attendance: 8,509; Referee: Alfredo Trentalange

2 December 2001 13	Atalanta	2–4	Internazionale	Bergamo
15:00 CET (UTC+01:00)	Doni 16', 22' (pen.)		Di Biagio 9'; Kallon 46'; Vieri 60' (pen.), 75'	Stadium: Stadio Atleti Azzurri d'Italia; Attendance: 21,874; Referee: Stefano Braschi

9 December 2001 14	Torino	1–2	Atalanta	Turin
15:00 CET (UTC+01:00)	Galante 14'		Doni 45+1'; Colombo 70'	Stadium: Stadio delle Alpi; Attendance: 20,000; Referee: Massimo De Santis

15 December 2001 15	Atalanta	4–1	Parma	Bergamo
15:00 CET (UTC+01:00)	Berretta 23'; Sala 43'; Doni 58'; Comandini 66'		Micoud 68'	Stadium: Stadio Atleti Azzurri d'Italia; Attendance: 13,770; Referee: Graziano Cesari

19 December 2001 6	Atalanta	1–1	Milan	Bergamo
15:00 CET (UTC+01:00)	Sala 32'		Shevchenko 57'	Stadium: Stadio Atleti Azzurri d'Italia; Attendance: 16,444; Referee: Alfredo Trentalange

23 December 2001 16	Perugia	2–0	Atalanta	Perugia
15:00 CET (UTC+01:00)	Bazzani 52', 90+1'			Stadium: Stadio Renato Curi; Attendance: 7,286; Referee: Daniele Tombolini

6 January 2002 17	Atalanta	1–2	Chievo	Bergamo
15:00 CET (UTC+01:00)	Berretta 5'		Marazzina 60'; Cossato 77'	Stadium: Stadio Atleti Azzurri d'Italia; Attendance: 16,633; Referee: Emilio Pellegrino

13 January 2002 18	Atalanta	2–2	Bologna	Bergamo
15:00 CET (UTC+01:00)	Doni 10' (pen.); Berretta 22'		Olive 41'; Brioschi 90+3'	Stadium: Stadio Atleti Azzurri d'Italia; Attendance: 15,000; Referee: Cosimo Bolognino

20 January 2002 19	Juventus	3–0	Atalanta	Turin
15:00 CET (UTC+01:00)	Tacchinardi 34'; Trézéguet 39', 73'			Stadium: Stadio delle Alpi; Attendance: 37,605; Referee: Tiziano Pieri

27 January 2002 20	Atalanta	2–0	Fiorentina	Bergamo
15:00 CET (UTC+01:00)	Piá 35'; Doni 75'			Stadium: Stadio Atleti Azzurri d'Italia; Attendance: 16,856; Referee: Stefano Farina

3 February 2002 21	Hellas Verona	3–1	Atalanta	Verona
15:00 CET (UTC+01:00)	Italiano 9'; Mutu 43' (pen.); Oddo 90+1' (pen.)		Doni 80'	Stadium: Stadio Marcantonio Bentegodi; Attendance: 14,600; Referee: Daniele Tombolini

10 February 2002 22	Atalanta	0–0	Brescia	Bergamo
15:00 CET (UTC+01:00)				Stadium: Stadio Atleti Azzurri d'Italia; Attendance: 20,000; Referee: Gennaro Borriello

16 February 2002 23	Milan	0–0	Atalanta	Milan
20:30 CET (UTC+01:00)				Stadium: San Siro; Attendance: 51,833; Referee: Daniele Tombolini

24 February 2002 24	Atalanta	0–1	Lazio	Bergamo
15:00 CET (UTC+01:00)			Poborský 78'	Stadium: Stadio Atleti Azzurri d'Italia; Attendance: 15,200; Referee: Gennaro Borriello

3 March 2002 25	Udinese	1–2	Atalanta	Udine
15:00 CET (UTC+01:00)	Manfredini 23'		Doni 56'; Pinardi 90+5'	Stadium: Stadio Friuli; Attendance: 14,272; Referee: Salvatore Racalbuto

10 March 2002 26	Atalanta	2–1	Lecce	Bergamo
15:00 CET (UTC+01:00)	Rossini 25'; Pinardi 30'		Cirillo 56'	Stadium: Stadio Atleti Azzurri d'Italia; Attendance: 15,533; Referee: Daniele Tombolini

16 March 2002 27	Roma	3–1	Atalanta	Rome
20:30 CET (UTC+01:00)	Montella 17', 68'; Carrera 29' (o.g.)		Doni 84'	Stadium: Stadio Olimpico; Attendance: 55,620; Referee: Gianluca Paparesta

24 March 2002 28	Venezia	0–1	Atalanta	Venice
15:00 CET (UTC+01:00)			Rossini 86'	Stadium: Stadio Pierluigi Penzo; Attendance: 8,449; Referee: Nicola Ayroldi

30 March 2002 29	Atalanta	1–1	Piacenza	Bergamo
15:00 CEST (UTC+02:00)	Comandini 45+1'		Cardone 71'	Stadium: Stadio Atleti Azzurri d'Italia; Attendance: 15,644; Referee: Fiorenzo Treossi

7 April 2002 30	Internazionale	1–2	Atalanta	Milan
15:00 CEST (UTC+02:00)	Vieri 47'		Sala 43'; Berretta 63'	Stadium: San Siro; Attendance: 67,023; Referee: Gianluca Paparesta

14 April 2002 31	Atalanta	1–1	Torino	Bergamo
15:00 CEST (UTC+02:00)	Berretta 15'		Franco 50'	Stadium: Stadio Atleti Azzurri d'Italia; Attendance: 14,875; Referee: Luca Palanca

21 April 2002 32	Parma	1–1	Atalanta	Parma
15:00 CEST (UTC+02:00)	Micoud 90+2'		Comandini 39' (pen.)	Stadium: Stadio Ennio Tardini; Attendance: 16,696; Referee: Stefano Braschi

28 April 2002 33	Atalanta	2–1	Perugia	Bergamo
15:00 CEST (UTC+02:00)	Blasi 36' (o.g.); Zauri 68'		Tedesco 16'	Stadium: Stadio Atleti Azzurri d'Italia; Attendance: 16,199; Referee: Pasquale Rodomonti

5 May 2002 34	Chievo	2–1	Atalanta	Verona
15:00 CEST (UTC+02:00)	Corradi 59'; Cossato 75'		Rossini 53'	Stadium: Stadio Marcantonio Bentegodi; Attendance: 11,558; Referee: Alfredo Trentalange

==== Topscorers ====
- (Italy) Cristiano Doni 16
- (Italy) Daniele Berretta 6
- (Italy) Fausto Rossini 5
- (Italy) Luigi Sala 4
- (Italy) Gianni Comandini 4

=== Coppa Italia ===
==== Knockout stage ====
===== Round of 16 =====
10 November 2001 First leg	Bologna	2–2	Atalanta	Bologna
20:45 CET (UTC+01:00)	Olive 18'; Bellucci 88'		Comandini 17'; Rossini 39'	Stadium: Stadio Renato Dall'Ara; Attendance: 5,000; Referee: Cosimo Bolognino

29 November 2001 Second leg	Atalanta	0–0 (2–2a agg.)	Bologna	Bergamo
18:00 CET (UTC+01:00)				Stadium: Stadio Atleti Azzurri d'Italia; Attendance: 5,000; Referee: Marco Gabriele

===== Quarter-finals =====
9 January 2002 First leg	Juventus	4–2	Atalanta	Turin
20:45 CET (UTC+01:00)	Amoruso 15', 58', 82' (pen.); Zalayeta 63'		Colombo 13'; Berretta 65'	Stadium: Stadio delle Alpi; Attendance: 599; Referee: Matteo Trefoloni

16 January 2002 Second leg	Atalanta	2–1 (4–5 agg.)	Juventus	Bergamo
20:45 CET (UTC+01:00)	Bianchi 72'; Piá 75'		Zalayeta 10'	Stadium: Stadio Atleti Azzurri d'Italia; Attendance: 6,000; Referee: Fiorenzo Treossi

== Sources ==
RSSSF - Italy 2001/02
