= 2003–04 SS Lazio season =

Lazio
2003–04 season
- President: Ugo Longo
- Manager: Roberto Mancini
- Stadium: Olimpico
- Serie A: 6th
- Coppa Italia: Winners
- UEFA Champions League: Group stage
- Top goalscorer: League: Bernardo Corradi (10); All: Stefano Fiore (16)
- Biggest win: 4–0 vs Milan; 5–2 vs Siena
- Biggest defeat: 0–4 vs Chelsea
Home colours	Away colours	Third colours

The 2003–04 season was the 104th season in Società Sportiva Lazio's history and their 16th consecutive season in the top-flight of Italian football. Despite financial problems, Lazio attained a respectable 6th place in Serie A and won the Coppa Italia, defeating Juventus in the two-legged final.

== Squad ==
Note: Flags indicate national team as defined under FIFA eligibility rules; some limited exceptions apply. Players may hold more than one non-FIFA nationality.

No.	Pos.	Nation	Player
1	GK	ITA	Angelo Peruzzi
2	DF	ITA	Francesco Colonnese
4	MF	ITA	Demetrio Albertini
5	DF	ITA	Luciano Zauri
6	MF	FRA	Ousmane Dabo
7	FW	ARG	Claudio López
8	DF	BRA	César
9	FW	ITA	Bernardo Corradi
10	MF	SCG	Dejan Stanković
11	DF	SCG	Siniša Mihajlović
14	MF	ITA	Stefano Fiore
15	GK	ITA	Fabrizio Casazza
16	MF	ITA	Giuliano Giannichedda

No.	Pos.	Nation	Player
17	DF	SUI	Guerino Gottardi
18	FW	ITA	Roberto Muzzi
19	DF	ITA	Giuseppe Favalli
20	DF	ITA	Fabio Liverani
21	FW	ITA	Simone Inzaghi
22	DF	ITA	Massimo Oddo
23	DF	ITA	Paolo Negro
24	DF	POR	Fernando Couto
26	MF	ITA	Fabrizio Melara
31	DF	NED	Jaap Stam
33	GK	ITA	Matteo Sereni
41	FW	ESP	Alfonso Delgado
53	MF	POR	Sérgio Conçeicão

=== Transfers ===
In
Pos.	Name	from	Type
MF	Sérgio Conçeicão	Internazionale	
MF	Ousmane Dabo	Atalanta	
DF	Luciano Zauri	Atalanta	
MF	Demetrio Albertini	Atletico Madrid	
FW	Roberto Muzzi	Udinese	
DF	Duccio Innocenti	Bari	
MF	Claudio De Sousa	Lodigiani	
GK	Matteo Sereni	Ipswich Town	
GK	Fabrizio Casazza	Sampdoria	
DF	Juan Pablo Sorín	Cruzeiro	loan ended
FW	Christian Manfredini	Osasuna	loan ended
MF	Gaizka Mendieta	Barcelona	loan ended
MF	Roberto Baronio	Perugia	loan ended

Out
Pos.	Name	To	Type
GK	Luca Marchegiani	Chievo	
FW	Enrico Chiesa	Siena	
GK	Emanuele Concetti	Perugia	
MF	Diego Simeone	Atletico Madrid	
MF	Nikola Lazetic	Genoa	
DF	Duccio Innocenti	Atalanta	loan
MF	Claudio De Sousa	Lodigiani	loan
DF	Juan Pablo Sorin	Cruzeiro	loan ended
FW	Christian Manfredini	Fiorentina	loan
MF	Lucas Castroman	Udinese	loan
MF	Dino Baggio	Blackburn Rovers	loan
MF	Gaizka Mendieta	Middlesbrough	loan
MF	Roberto Baronio	Chievo	loan

==== Winter ====
In
Pos.	Name	from	Type

Out
Pos.	Name	To	Type
MF	Dejan Stankovic	Internazionale	€4,000,000
MF	Sergio Conceicao	Porto	loan
MF	Dino Baggio	Ancona	loan

== Competitions ==
=== Serie A ===
==== League table ====
Pos	Team	Pld	W	D	L	GF	GA	GD	Pts	Qualification or relegation
4	Internazionale	34	17	8	9	59	37	+22	59	Qualification to Champions League third qualifying round
5	Parma	34	16	10	8	57	46	+11	58	Qualification to UEFA Cup first round
6	Lazio	34	16	8	10	52	38	+14	56	Qualification to UEFA Cup first round
7	Udinese (Note: Udinese gained entry to the 2004–05 UEFA Cup as Coppa Italia because both finalists Lazio and Juventus qualified for the 2004–05 UEFA Cup and the 2004–05 UEFA Champions League through league position, respectively.)	34	13	11	10	44	40	+4	50	Qualification to UEFA Cup first round
8	Sampdoria	34	11	13	10	40	42	−2	46	

Source: Almanacco Illustrato del Calcio – La Storia 1898-2004, Panini Edizioni, Modena, September 2005
Rules for classification: 1) points; 2) tiebreaker for relevant positions 3) head-to-head points and goal difference; 4) head-to-head goals scored; 5) goal difference; 6) number of goals scored.

==== Results summary ====
Overall								Home						Away					
Pld	W	D	L	GF	GA	GD	Pts	W	D	L	GF	GA	GD	W	D	L	GF	GA	GD
34	16	8	10	52	38	+14	56	10	4	3	35	19	+16	6	4	7	17	19	−2

==== Results by round ====
Round	1	2	3	4	5	6	7	8	9	10	11	12	13	14	15	16	17	18	19	20	21	22	23	24	25	26	27	28	29	30	31	32	33	34	35	36
Ground	H	A	H	A	H	A	H	A	A	H	A	H	A	H	A	H	A	A	H	A	H	A	H	A	H	H	A	A	H	A	H	H	A	H	A	H
Result	W	W	L	D	W	L	W	W	L	W	L	W	W	W	L	L	D	W	D	W	W	D	L	P	D	P	L	W	W	L	W	D	D	D	L	W
Position	1	1	6	6	5	5	5	5	5	4	6	6	5	4	5	6	6	4	5	4	4	4	4	4	4	4	4	4	4	6	6	5	5	5	6	6

Source: Competitive matches
A = Away; H = Home; W = Win; D = Draw; L = Loss; P = Postponed; = Leader, UEFA Champions League Groups stage; = UEFA Champions League Groups stage; = UEFA Champions League Qualifying round; = 2004–05 UEFA Cup; = 2004–05 Serie B

==== Matches ====
31 August 2003 1	Lazio	4–1	Lecce	Rome
15:00 CEST (UTC+02:00)	Albertini 20'; Corradi 25'; Fiore 36'; Oddo 84'	Report	Konan 50'	Stadium: Stadio Olimpico; Attendance: 7,760; Referee: Paolo Bertini

13 September 2003 2	Sampdoria	1–2	Lazio	Genoa
18:00 CEST (UTC+02:00)	Bazzani 73'	Report	S. Inzaghi 9'; Albertini 64' (pen.)	Stadium: Stadio Luigi Ferraris; Attendance: 32,476; Referee: Domenico Messina

21 September 2003 3	Lazio	2–3	Parma	Rome
15:00 CEST (UTC+02:00)	Stam 33'; S. Inzaghi 79'	Report	Bresciano 1', 89'; Adriano 63'	Stadium: Stadio Olimpico; Attendance: 48,500; Referee: Cosimo Bolognino

28 September 2003 4	Empoli	2–2	Lazio	Empoli
20:30 CEST (UTC+02:00)	Di Natale 74'; Tavano 78'	Report	Stanković 37'; Fiore 87'	Stadium: Stadio Carlo Castellani; Attendance: 5,816; Referee: Marco Gabriele

5 October 2003 5	Lazio	1–0	Chievo	Rome
15:00 CEST (UTC+02:00)	Mihajlović 64'	Report		Stadium: Stadio Olimpico; Attendance: 46,160; Referee: Pierluigi Collina

19 October 2003 6	Milan	1–0	Lazio	Milan
20:30 CEST (UTC+02:00)	Pirlo 37'	Report		Stadium: San Siro; Attendance: 62,122; Referee: Salvatore Racalbuto

26 October 2003 7	Lazio	2–1	Bologna	Rome
15:00 CET (UTC+01:00)	S. Inzaghi 83'; Corradi 90+1'	Report	Dabo 87' (o.g.)	Stadium: Stadio Olimpico; Attendance: 45,338; Referee: Cosimo Bolognino

1 November 2003 8	Udinese	1–2	Lazio	Udine
18:00 CET (UTC+01:00)	Iaquinta 27'	Report	Corradi 16'; S. Inzaghi 33'	Stadium: Stadio Friuli; Attendance: 15,422; Referee: Matteo Trefoloni

9 November 2003 9	Roma	2–0	Lazio	Rome
20:30 CET (UTC+01:00)	Mancini 81'; Emerson 86'	Report		Stadium: Stadio Olimpico; Attendance: 72,844; Referee: Matteo Trefoloni

23 November 2003 10	Lazio	3–1	Perugia	Rome
15:00 CET (UTC+01:00)	Stanković 45+2'; Corradi 87'; S. Inzaghi 90+4'	Report	Grosso 62'	Stadium: Stadio Olimpico; Attendance: 44,937; Referee: Cosimo Bolognino

29 November 2003 11	Siena	3–0	Lazio	Siena
18:00 CET (UTC+01:00)	Taddei 41', 43'; Menegazzo 90+5'	Report		Stadium: Stadio Artemio Franchi; Attendance: 13,022; Referee: Paolo Bertini

6 December 2003 12	Lazio	2–0	Juventus	Rome
20:30 CET (UTC+01:00)	Corradi 21'; Fiore 45+3'	Report		Stadium: Stadio Olimpico; Attendance: 60,929; Referee: Cosimo Bolognino

14 December 2003 13	Ancona	0–1	Lazio	Ancona
15:00 CET (UTC+01:00)		Report	Liverani 76'	Stadium: Stadio del Conero; Attendance: 11,366; Referee: Salvatore Racalbuto

21 December 2003 14	Lazio	2–1	Internazionale	Rome
20:30 CET (UTC+01:00)	Corradi 42'; Zauri 82'	Report	Vieri 30'	Stadium: Stadio Olimpico; Attendance: 58,636; Referee: Matteo Trefoloni

6 January 2004 15	Reggina	2–1	Lazio	Reggio Calabria
15:00 CET (UTC+01:00)	Di Michele 60'; Cozza 71'	Report	Liverani 16'	Stadium: Stadio Oreste Granillo; Attendance: 19,858; Referee: Pierluigi Collina

11 January 2004 16	Lazio	0–1	Brescia	Rome
15:00 CET (UTC+01:00)		Report	Di Biagio 5'	Stadium: Stadio Olimpico; Attendance: 44,929; Referee: Nicola Rizzoli

17 January 2004 17	Modena	1–1	Lazio	Modena
18:00 CET (UTC+01:00)	Campedelli 61'	Report	C. López 24'	Stadium: Stadio Alberto Braglia; Attendance: 13,937; Referee: Salvatore Racalbuto

25 January 2004 18	Lecce	0–1	Lazio	Lecce
15:00 CET (UTC+01:00)		Report	César 55'	Stadium: Stadio Via del Mare; Attendance: 10,834; Referee: Paolo Dondarini

1 February 2004 19	Lazio	1–1	Sampdoria	Rome
15:00 CET (UTC+01:00)	Fiore 11'	Report	Bazzani 50'	Stadium: Stadio Olimpico; Attendance: 46,243; Referee: Massimiliano Saccani

8 February 2004 20	Parma	0–3	Lazio	Parma
15:00 CET (UTC+01:00)		Report	C. López 40' (pen.), 57'; Corradi 65'	Stadium: Stadio Ennio Tardini; Attendance: 14,208; Referee: Antonio Dattilo

14 February 2004 21	Lazio	3–0	Empoli	Rome
18:00 CET (UTC+01:00)	Couto 5'; Zauri 45+2'; Stam 71'	Report		Stadium: Stadio Olimpico; Attendance: 44,511; Referee: Salvatore Racalbuto

22 February 2004 22	Chievo	0–0	Lazio	Verona
15:00 CET (UTC+01:00)		Report		Stadium: Stadio Marc'Antonio Bentegodi; Attendance: 11,706; Referee: Matteo Trefoloni

29 February 2004 23	Lazio	0–1	Milan	Rome
20:30 CET (UTC+01:00)		Report	Ambrosini 75'	Stadium: Stadio Olimpico; Attendance: 54,632; Referee: Gianluca Paparesta

14 March 2004 25	Lazio	2–2	Udinese	Rome
15:00 CET (UTC+01:00)	Muzzi 5'; S. Inzaghi 6'	Report	Castromán 11'; Iaquinta 88'	Stadium: Stadio Olimpico; Attendance: 45,296; Referee: Matteo Trefoloni

25 March 2004 24	Bologna	2–1	Lazio	Bologna
20:30 CET (UTC+01:00)	Signori 34'; C. Amoroso 64'	Report	Fiore 38'	Stadium: Stadio Renato Dall'Ara; Attendance: 19,187; Referee: Cosimo Bolognino
Note: Match rescheduled from 7 March 2004 due to snow.

28 March 2004 27	Perugia	1–2	Lazio	Perugia
15:00 CEST (UTC+02:00)	Brienza 49'	Report	Fiore 29'; Giannichedda 58'	Stadium: Stadio Renato Curi; Attendance: 9,096; Referee: Salvatore Racalbuto

4 April 2004 28	Lazio	5–2	Siena	Rome
15:00 CEST (UTC+02:00)	César 4', 45+1', 49'; Fiore 29'; Corradi 78'	Report	Guigou 9'; Taddei 24'	Stadium: Stadio Olimpico; Attendance: 54,350; Referee: Paolo Dondarini

10 April 2004 29	Juventus	1–0	Lazio	Turin
20:30 CEST (UTC+02:00)	Trezeguet 88'	Report		Stadium: Stadio delle Alpi; Attendance: 31,190; Referee: Paolo Bertini

18 April 2004 30	Lazio	4–2	Ancona	Rome
15:00 CEST (UTC+02:00)	Couto 12', 81'; Fiore 73'; Zauri 89'	Report	Bucchi 12'; D. Andersson 64'	Stadium: Stadio Olimpico; Attendance: 44,044; Referee: Roberto Rosetti

21 April 2004 26	Lazio	1–1	Roma	Rome
18:00 CEST (UTC+02:00)	Corradi 35'	Report	Totti 61' (pen.)	Stadium: Stadio Olimpico; Attendance: 51,590; Referee: Roberto Rosetti
Note: Rescheduled. Match suspended on 21 March 2004 at 47’ with 0-0 score due to fake news about a child killed by Police.

25 April 2004 31	Internazionale	0–0	Lazio	Milan
15:00 CEST (UTC+02:00)		Report		Stadium: San Siro; Attendance: 58,967; Referee: Pierluigi Collina

2 May 2004 32	Lazio	1–1	Reggina	Rome
15:00 CEST (UTC+02:00)	C. López 23'	Report	Cozza 53' (pen.)	Stadium: Stadio Olimpico; Attendance: 50,598; Referee: Cosimo Bolognino

9 May 2004 33	Brescia	2–1	Lazio	Brescia
15:00 CEST (UTC+02:00)	Mauri 81'; R. Baggio 89'	Report	César 90+3'	Stadium: Stadio Mario Rigamonti; Attendance: 15,000; Referee: Salvatore Racalbuto

16 May 2004 34	Lazio	2–1	Modena	Rome
15:00 CEST (UTC+02:00)	Corradi 17'; César 49'	Report	Amoruso 84'	Stadium: Stadio Olimpico; Attendance: 50,347; Referee: Domenico Messina

=== Coppa Italia ===
==== Round of 16 ====
3 December 2003 First leg	Modena	0–2	Lazio	Modena
18:00 CET			S. Inzaghi 41'; Muzzi 64'	Stadium: Stadio Alberto Braglia; Attendance: 6,000; Referee: Domenico Messina

17 December 2003 Second leg	Lazio	1–0 (3–0 agg.)	Modena	Rome
21:00 CET	Liverani 35'			Stadium: Stadio Olimpico; Attendance: 30,000; Referee: Stefano Cassarà

==== Quarter-finals ====
14 January 2004 First leg	Lazio	2–0	Parma	Rome
18:00 CET	Muzzi 36'; Stanković 60'			Stadium: Stadio Olimpico; Attendance: 21,000; Referee: Emilio Pellegrino

20 January 2004 Second leg	Parma	1–1 (3–1 agg.)	Lazio	Parma
17:30 CET	Bresciano 82'		Stanković 72'	Stadium: Stadio Ennio Tardini; Attendance: 5,493; Referee: Emidio Morganti

==== Semi-finals ====
5 February 2004 First leg	Milan	1–2	Lazio	Milan
21:00 CET	F. Inzaghi 45+2'	Report	Fiore 1'; Couto 36'	Stadium: San Siro; Attendance: 10,907; Referee: Roberto Rosetti

11 February 2004 Second leg	Lazio	4–0 (6–1 agg.)	Milan	Rome
21:00 CET	César 11'; Liverani 15'; Fiore 35', 41'	Report		Stadium: Stadio Olimpico; Attendance: 60,000; Referee: Pierluigi Collina

==== Final ====
17 March 2004 First leg	Lazio	2–0	Juventus	Rome
21:00 CEST	Fiore 59', 80'			Stadium: Stadio Olimpico; Attendance: 62,204; Referee: Pierluigi Collina

12 May 2004 Second leg	Juventus	2–2 (2–4 agg.)	Lazio	Turin
21:00 CEST	Trezeguet 20'; Del Piero 46'		Corradi 69'; Fiore 86'	Stadium: Stadio delle Alpi; Attendance: 38,849; Referee: Gianluca Paparesta

=== Top scorers ===
- (Italy) Bernardo Corradi 10
- (Brazil) César 6
- (Italy) Simone Inzaghi 6
- (Italy) Stefano Fiore 6
- (Argentina) Claudio López 4 (1)

=== UEFA Champions League ===
==== Third qualifying round ====
13 August 2003 First leg	Lazio (Italy)	3–1	(Portugal) Benfica	Rome, Italy
21:00	Corradi 16'; Fiore 54'; Mihajlović 80'	Report	Simão 65'	Stadium: Stadio Olimpico; Attendance: 57,996; Referee: Herbert Fandel (Germany)

27 August 2003 Second leg	Benfica (Portugal)	0–1 (1–4 agg.)	(Italy) Lazio	Porto, Portugal
22:00		Report	César 28'	Stadium: Estádio do Bessa; Attendance: 16,974; Referee: Urs Meier (Switzerland)

==== Group stage ====
===== Group G =====
Pos	Team	Pld	W	D	L	GF	GA	GD	Pts	Qualification	CHE	SPP	BES	LAZ
1	(England) Chelsea	6	4	1	1	9	3	+6	13	Advance to knockout stage	—	0–0	0–2	2–1
2	(Czech Republic) Sparta Prague	6	2	2	2	5	5	0	8	Advance to knockout stage	0–1	—	2–1	1–0
3	(Turkey) Beşiktaş	6	2	1	3	5	7	−2	7	Transfer to UEFA Cup	0–2	1–0	—	0–2
4	(Italy) Lazio	6	1	2	3	6	10	−4	5		0–4	2–2	1–1	—

Source: RSSSF

16 September 2003 1	Beşiktaş (Turkey)	0–2	(Italy) Lazio	Istanbul, Turkey
20:45		Report	Stam 37'; Fiore 77'	Stadium: BJK İnönü Stadium; Attendance: 25,000; Referee: Kim Milton Nielsen (Denmark)

1 October 2003 2	Lazio (Italy)	2–2	(Czech Republic) Sparta Prague	Rome, Italy
20:45	Inzaghi 46', 61' (pen.)	Report	Sionko 27'; Poborský 35'	Stadium: Stadio Olimpico; Attendance: 40,000; Referee: Claude Colombo (France)

22 October 2003 3	Chelsea (England)	2–1	(Italy) Lazio	London, England
20:45	Lampard 57'; Mutu 65'	Report	Inzaghi 38'	Stadium: Stamford Bridge; Attendance: 40,400; Referee: Terje Hauge (Norway)

4 November 2003 4	Lazio (Italy)	0–4	(England) Chelsea	Rome, Italy
20:45		Report	Crespo 15'; Guðjohnsen 70'; Duff 75'; Lampard 80'	Stadium: Stadio Olimpico; Attendance: 48,500; Referee: Valentin Ivanov (Russia)

26 November 2003 5	Lazio (Italy)	1–1	(Turkey) Beşiktaş	Rome, Italy
20:45	Muzzi 56'	Report	Pancu 45+2' (pen.)	Stadium: Stadio Olimpico; Attendance: 49,000; Referee: Markus Merk (Germany)

9 December 2003 6	Sparta Prague (Czech Republic)	1–0	(Italy) Lazio	Prague, Czech Republic
20:45	Kincl 90+3'	Report		Stadium: Letná Stadium; Attendance: 17,825; Referee: Lucílio Batista (Portugal)

== Statistics ==
=== Players statistics ===
No.	Pos	Nat	Player	Total		Serie A		Champions League		Coppa Italia	
No.	Pos	Nat	Player	Apps	Goals	Apps	Goals	Apps	Goals	Apps	Goals
1	GK	(Italy) ITA	Peruzzi	34	-33	27	-26	7	-7		
22	DF	(Italy) ITA	Oddo	44	1	22+9	1	6	0	7	0
31	DF	(Netherlands) NED	Stam	42	3	29	2	7	1	6	0
11	DF	(Serbia and Montenegro) SCG	Mihajlovic	37	2	25+1	1	5	1	6	0
19	DF	(Italy) ITA	Favalli	43	0	28+1	0	8	0	6	0
14	MF	(Italy) ITA	Fiore	47	16	30+2	8	6+2	2	7	6
20	MF	(Italy) ITA	Liverani	39	4	21+5	2	1+5	0	7	2
16	MF	(Italy) ITA	Giannichedda	32	1	17+5	1	1+3	0	6	0
8	MF	(Brazil) BRA	César	20	8	11+3	6	1	1	5	1
9	FW	(Italy) ITA	Corradi	46	12	27+5	10	8	1	6	1
7	FW	(Argentina) ARG	Claudio	36	4	20+7	4	3+1	0	5	0
33	GK	(Italy) ITA	Sereni	18	-20	7+2	-12	1	-4	8	-4
24	DF	(Portugal) POR	Couto	31	4	19+4	3	3+1	0	4	1
6	MF	(France) FRA	Dabo	24	0	17+2	0	0+1	0	4	0
4	MF	(Italy) ITA	Albertini	35	2	15+8	2	8	0	4	0
10	MF	(Serbia and Montenegro) SCG	Stankovic	27	4	15	2	8	0	4	2
18	FW	(Italy) ITA	Muzzi	34	4	14+8	1	1+5	1	6	2
5	DF	(Italy) ITA	Zauri	30	3	12+8	3	3+1	0	6	0
21	FW	(Italy) ITA	Inzaghi	33	10	9+15	6	4+1	3	4	1
23	DF	(Italy) ITA	Negro	17	0	7+6	0	2+1	0	1	0
53	MF	(Portugal) POR	Conceicao	16	0	2+5	0	3+4	0	2	0
41	FW	(Spain) ESP	Delgado	7	0	0+4	0	0	0	3	0
17	DF	(Switzerland) SUI	Gottardi	2	0	0	0	0+1	0	1	0
17	DF	(Italy) ITA	E. Corsi	1	0	0	0	0	0	0+1	0
15	GK	(Italy) ITA	Casazza	0	0	0	0	-	-	0	0
2	DF	(Italy) ITA	Colonnese	0	0	0	0				
26	MF	(Italy) ITA	Melara	0	0	0	0				

- Source: http://calcio-seriea.net/presenze/2003/1242/
