= Gianni Comandini =

Italian former footballer

Personal information
- Date of birth: 18 May 1977 (age 49)
- Place of birth: Cesena, Italy
- Height: 1.80 m (5 ft 11 in)
- Position: Forward

Youth career
- Cesena

Senior career*
Years	Team	Apps	(Gls)
1994–1996	Cesena	1	(0)
1996–1997	Montevarchi	28	(3)
1997–1999	Cesena	62	(20)
1999–2000	Vicenza	34	(20)
2000–2001	AC Milan	13	(2)
2001–2005	Atalanta	48	(7)
2004	→ Genoa (loan)	10	(1)
2005	→ Ternana (loan)	7	(1)
Total		203	(54)

International career
1998–2000	Italy U21	19	(6)
- * Club domestic league appearances and goals

Gianni Comandini (born 18 May 1977) is an Italian former footballer who played principally as a forward.

== Club career ==
=== Early career ===
Born in Cesena, Comandini joined the youth academy of his hometown team Cesena, and made his full debut for them in Serie B during the 1995–96 championship. After appearing once during the season, he transferred for a year to Serie C1 side Montevarchi, returning in 1997–98 to newly relegated Cesena. There, he played regularly throughout the season, contributing to the team's promotion back to Serie B.

In 1998, Comandini signed to join Vicenza; the contract specified that he would first spend another season with Cesena, for whom he scored 14 times during the season. At Vicenza, he was the club's top scorer during the 1999–2000 season, his 20 goals contributing to the team's Serie B championship title and promotion to Serie A. At the season's close, he was sold to AC Milan for around 20 billion lire.

During his first season in Serie A, Comandini played in 13 games, scoring twice, both times in the 6–0 derby against Internazionale on 11 May 2001, in the 30th matchday of the 2000–01 season. He also scored in a 2000–01 UEFA Champions League qualifier against Dinamo Zagreb.

=== Atalanta ===
In June 2001, Comandini was sold to Atalanta for 30 billion lire; teammate Luigi Sala for 7 billion lire.; teammate Luca Saudati for 18 billion lire as part of Cristian Zenoni and Massimo Donati's deal to Milan.

He scored four times for Atalanta during 2001–02, and appeared in ten games during their 2003–04 campaign, before transferring to Serie B side Genoa in January 2004. He returned later that year to Atalanta, for whom he appeared twice in Serie A, before a January 2005 transfer to Ternana, where he made seven appearances.

In 2006, following persistent physical problems and at age 29, Comandini retired from professional football. He moved back to Cesena, where he opened a restaurant and played for the Polisportiva Force Vigne, an amateur side founded by his father Paolo in 1983 and affiliated to the Italian amateur sports federation Centro Sportivo Italiano.

== International career ==
Comandini was a member of the Italy Under 21 national side between 1998 and 2000, earning 19 caps and scoring 6 goals, usually playing as a second striker behind Nicola Ventola. Comandini represented Italy at the 2000 UEFA European Under-21 Championship, under manager Marco Tardelli, and was an important part of the team's successful campaign, as they won the tournament.

The same year, being eligible for the under 23 side and having never appeared for the full Italy national side in a World Cup, he represented Italy at the 2000 Summer Olympic Games in Sydney. He appeared in four games, including the quarter-final defeat to finalists Spain.

== Honours ==
=== Club ===
Vicenza

- Serie B: 1999–2000

=== International ===
Italy U21

- UEFA European Under-21 Championship: 2000
