= Luigi Sala =

Italian footballer (born 1974)

Personal information
- Full name: Luigi Sala
- Date of birth: 21 February 1974 (age 52)
- Place of birth: Mariano Comense, Italy
- Height: 1.88 m (6 ft 2 in)
- Position: Defender

Senior career*
Years	Team	Apps	(Gls)
1992–1995	Como	60	(1)
1995–1998	Bari	89	(4)
1998–2001	AC Milan	57	(1)
2001–2005	Atalanta	90	(10)
2003–2004	→ Chievo (loan)	17	(2)
2005–2008	Sampdoria	73	(1)
2008–2009	Udinese	2	(0)
2009–2011	AlbinoLeffe	59	(5)
Total		447	(24)
- * Club domestic league appearances and goals

Luigi Sala (born 21 February 1974) is a former Italian football defender. He played as a central defender.

== Club career ==
In June 2001, Sala was sold to Atalanta for 7 billion lire, along with Gianni Comandini (30 billion) and Luca Saudati (18 billion), as part of Cristian Zenoni and Massimo Donati's deal to Milan, for 60 billion Italian lire.

In 2002–03 season, he was the first choice and partnered with Cesare Natali.

In December 2002, Sala was injured and rested one month. He returned to field on 6 January, a rescheduled round 13 match against Torino.

In June 2005, he was signed by Sampdoria.

In August 2008, he was signed by Udinese on free transfer.

He signed a two-year contract with AlbinoLeffe in 2009.

In 2010–11 season, he changed his shirt number from 26 to 21.

=== Italian football scandal ===
Sala was banned 2 year after a plea bargain on 1 August 2012 due to involvement in 2011–12 Italian football scandal. He was questioned by the prosecutor on 8 March 2012.

== Honours ==
AC Milan

- Serie A: 1998–99
