= Roberto Previtali =

Italian footballer

Personal information
- Date of birth: 3 August 1981 (age 45)
- Place of birth: Trescore Balneario, Italy
- Height: 1.70 m (5 ft 7 in)
- Position: Midfielder

Youth career
- –1999: Alzano
- 1999–2001: Atalanta

Senior career*
Years	Team	Apps	(Gls)
2001–2003	Atalanta	1	(0)
2001–2002	→ Lumezzane (loan)	20	(0)
2002–2003	→ Alzano (loan)	27	(0)
2003–2004	Spezia	21	(1)
2004–2012	AlbinoLeffe	166	(6)
2012–2013	Cremonese	7	(0)
2013	AlbinoLeffe	10	(0)
2013–2014	Polisportiva Sarnico		
2014–2015	AlzanoCene	12	(0)
2016	GS Grumellese Calcio	10	(0)
2016–2019	ASD CazzagoBornato		
Total		274	(7)

International career
2001	Italy U20	2	(0)
- * Club domestic league appearances and goals

Roberto Previtali (born 3 August 1981) is a Italian former professional footballer who played as a midfielder.

== Club career ==
=== Early career ===
Born in Trescore Balneario, the Province of Bergamo, Previtali started his professional career with Atalanta. He made his Serie A debut on 22 April 2001 against Perugia. He started that match and the Bergamo side 2-2 draw with Perugia away. Previtali graduated from the Primavera under-20 team in June and left for Serie C1 side Lumezzane on loan in July, along with Mauro Minelli, which also located in Lombardy region. His loan with Lumezzane was extended but in August 2002 left for his former club Alzano Virescit, which also a Serie C1 and Lombardy club.

In summer 2003 he left for Serie C1 side Spezia in co-ownership deal, along with Federico Pettinà. In exchange, Nicola Mingazzini joined opposite side for undisclosed fee and in co-ownership deal.

In June 2004, Spezia bought the remain registration rights of the players from Atalanta . But in July 2004, he was sold back to the Province of Bergamo for Serie B side AlbinoLeffe.

=== AlbinoLeffe ===
In the first 2 seasons with AlbinoLeffe, he was not the regular starter. He made a break through in 2006-07 season, made 26 league appearances (which started 22 of them). But in 2007-08 season, he just made 7 league appearances (plus 1 in playoffs, total 8), which that season was the best season of AlbinoLeffe in recent years, finished the 4th and as the losing side of promotion playoffs.

In 2008–09 and 2009–10 season, he re–gained his regular place, started 52 league matches in possible 82 matches, and also made 7 substitute appearances. he missed a few games in 2011–12 Serie B due to injury. After the club relegated and was fined heavily due to involvement in 2011 Italian football scandal, he left for fellow third division club Cremonese. On 30 January 2013 he terminated the contract in order to re-join AlbinoLeffe.

== International career ==
Previtali was a member of the Italy national under–20 football team, and made 2 appearances for the side in the Four Nations Tournament.
