= José Espinal =

Dominican-Italian footballer (born 1982)

Personal information
- Full name: José Elpys Espinal Marte
- Date of birth: 14 November 1982 (age 43)
- Place of birth: Santo Domingo, Dominican Republic
- Height: 1.78 m (5 ft 10 in)
- Position: Forward

Team information
- Current team: Giana Erminio (assistant coach & match analyst)

Senior career*
Years	Team	Apps	(Gls)
1999–2001	Atalanta	3	(0)
2001–2002	Alzano	14	(1)
2002–2003	AlbinoLeffe	5	(1)
2003–2004	Nuova Albano	11	(1)
2004	Saronno	10	(1)
2004–2005	Sapri	4	(0)
2005–2006	Sanremese	27	(0)
2006–2009	Novara	48	(4)
2008–2009	→ Gela (loan)	18	(2)
2009	→ Rovigo (loan)	11	(4)
2009–2010	Cesena	1	(0)
2010	→ Giacomense (loan)	14	(1)
2010–2012	Eupen	56	(8)
2012–2013	Verbano	13	(4)
2013–2015	Carlin's Boys		
2015–2016	Pietra Ligure		
2018–	Ospedaletti Calcio		

International career^{‡}
2014	Dominican Republic	2	(0)
- * Club domestic league appearances and goals ‡ National team caps and goals as of 3 September 2014

José Elpys Espinal Marte (born 14 November 1982) is a Dominican former footballer who played as a forward, currently in charge as assistant coach and team analyst at Serie C Group A club Giana Erminio. He also holds Italian citizenship.

He is the twin brother of Vinicio Espinal.

== Playing career ==
Along with his twin brother Vinicio, both started their career at Atalanta. José left for Serie C1 clubs from 2001 to 2003 and from 2003 to 2005 played at Serie D clubs. He played all four matches in promotion playoffs 2005, and scored five goals.

In 2005, he returned to professional football for Sanremese at Serie C2. In the following season, he signed for Novara of Serie C1. He failed secured a regular place in 2007–08 season, and left for Lega Pro Seconda Divisione clubs on loan.

On 31 August 2009, José Espinal was swapped for Christian Jidayi of Cesena. He played his first Serie B match for Cesena on 5 January 2010.

On 20 January 2010 he was loaned to Giacomense.

On 13 July 2010, he signed a one-year contract for the newly promoted Belgian club AS Eupen.

In December 2013, Espinal joined to Carlin's Boys.

Internationally, José received his first call for Dominican Republic in August 2011 to participate in two 2014 World Cup qualifying matches against El Salvador and Surinam, but he did not appear. He made his senior debut on 30 August 2014, when he was a starter in a lost friendly against El Salvador.

== Coaching career ==
On 24 June 2025, José Espinal joined Serie C club Giana Erminio as assistant coach and team analyst for his twin brother Vinicio.
