= Fabrizio Casazza =

Italian former footballer

Personal information
- Date of birth: 16 September 1970 (age 56)
- Place of birth: Genoa, Italy
- Height: 1.79 m (5 ft 10 1/2 in)
- Position: Goalkeeper

Youth career
- 1988–1989: Biellese
- 1989–1990: Sampdoria

Senior career*
| Years | Team | Apps | (Gls) |
| 1990–1991 | Fidelis Andria | 1 | (0) |
| 1991–1994 | Pro Sesto | 73 | (0) |
| 1994–1996 | Verona | 47 | (0) |
| 1996–1999 | Torino | 50 | (0) |
| 1999–2000 | Venezia | 14 | (0) |
| 2000–2003 | Sampdoria | 10 | (0) |
| 2003–2005 | Lazio | 3 | (0) |
| 2005–2006 | Pavia | 50 | (0) |
| 2007 | Udinese | 1 | (0) |
| 2008 | Caravaggese | 14 | (0) |
- * Club domestic league appearances and goals

Fabrizio Casazza (born 16 September 1970) is an Italian former footballer who played as a goalkeeper.

== Playing career ==
Casazza started his career at Sampdoria, but spent his career at Serie C1 for Fidelis Andria and Pro Sesto.

He transferred to Verona in 1994, started his first Serie B season. He then played for Torino (Serie B) and Venezia (Serie A) before rejoin U.C. Sampdoria in 2000, to play second goalkeeper role, behind Matteo Sereni (2000–01), Luca Mondini (2001–02) and Luigi Turci (2002–03).

He was signed by S.S. Lazio in 2003, and played for 2 years, as Angelo Peruzzi and Sereni backup. He played his only match at UEFA Cup on 4 November 2004.

He then joined Serie C1 team Pavia.

On 17 January 2007, A.C. Milan signed Marco Storari from Messina, and Messina signed Gabriele Paoletti on 19 January from Udinese to replace the 1st choice place.

To provide extra cover for Morgan De Sanctis, Casazza was signed for Udinese on 24 January.

== Coaching career ==
After retiring as a goalkeeper, Casazza took management duties at Genoa amateurs Bolzanetese in 2008–09. From July 2009 he is goalkeeper coach at Virtus Entella.
