= Ousmane Dabo =

French footballer (born 1977)

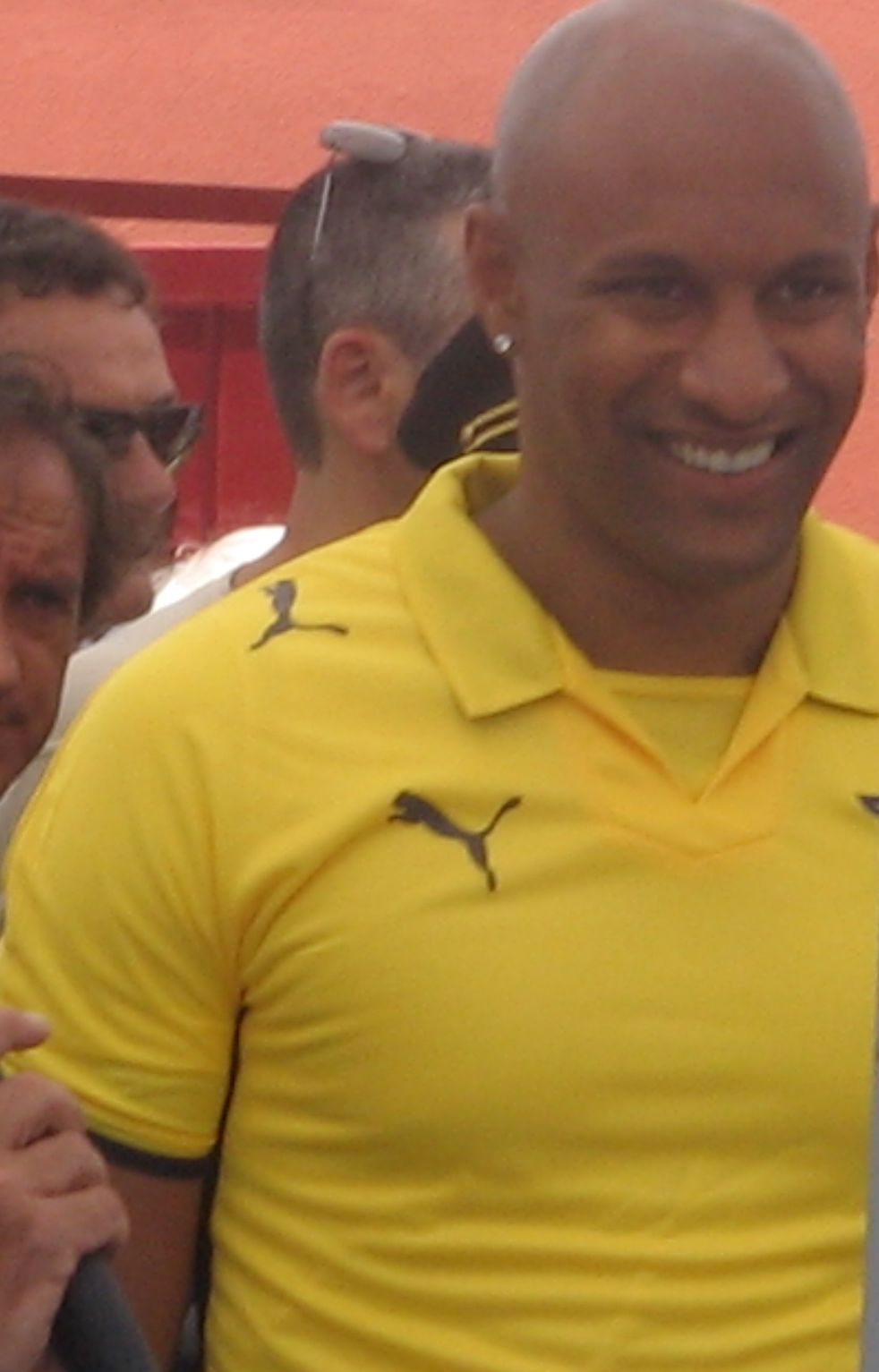
- Dabo with Lazio in 2008

Personal information
- Full name: El Hadji Ousmane Dabo
- Date of birth: 8 February 1977 (age 49)
- Place of birth: Laval, France
- Height: 1.83 m (6 ft 0 in)
- Position: Midfielder

Youth career
- 1982–1985: Forcé
- 1985–1990: Laval
- 1990–1995: Rennes

Senior career*
Years	Team	Apps	(Gls)
1995–1998	Rennes	41	(2)
1998–1999	Inter Milan	13	(0)
1999	→ Vicenza (loan)	13	(0)
1999–2000	Parma	17	(0)
2000–2001	AS Monaco	16	(0)
2001	→ Vicenza (loan)	17	(1)
2001–2003	Atalanta	52	(4)
2003–2006	Lazio	79	(3)
2006–2008	Manchester City	13	(0)
2008–2010	Lazio	46	(1)
2011	New England Revolution	3	(0)
Total		310	(11)

International career
2003	France	3	(0)
- * Club domestic league appearances and goals

El Hadji Ousmane Dabo (born 8 February 1977) is a French former professional footballer who played as a midfielder.

Dabo played for Rennes, Inter Milan, Vicenza, Parma, Monaco, Atalanta, Lazio, Manchester City and New England Revolution. He represented France three times at full international level.

== Early life ==
Dabo was born in Laval, Mayenne. His father Moussa Dabo was a player for the Senegalese national team and Stade Lavallois.

== Club career ==
=== Early career ===
Dabo started his career at Rennes, before he and team-mate Mikaël Silvestre were signed by Inter Milan in 1998. Dabo was not a regular first team player for Inter, and a few months later he was loaned out to Vicenza, where he made 13 Serie A appearances. Dabo spent the following season at Parma under Arrigo Sacchi, making sixteen appearances. In June 2000, Inter stated Silvestre and Dabo were bought for only ₤3 million and sold for ₤30 million. In June 2000 he changed clubs again, returning to the French league with Monaco in an exchange deal involving Sabri Lamouchi. Six months later he returned to Vicenza on loan, and in the close season made a permanent move to Atalanta. At the Bergamo club he secured regular first team football, and in 2003 he gained a call-up to the France national team for the FIFA Confederations Cup, which Dabo described as "a surprise".

=== Lazio ===
In summer of 2003 Dabo joined Lazio, along with team-mate Luciano Zauri, at first a co-ownership deal but raised to a total of €3.225 million and €5.65 million transfer fees after Lazio bought duo remain rights in June 2004. Dabo became an important and popular part of the Lazio midfield due to his organised style of play, making 79 appearances for the club.

=== Manchester City ===
After interest from a variety of Premier League clubs in 2006, Dabo joined Manchester City on a Bosman transfer, signing a three-year contract. Dabo cited a positive impression of the club arising from a friendly between Manchester City and Lazio at the City of Manchester Stadium as one of his main reasons for joining Manchester City. His debut for the club came in the opening match of the season, a 3–0 Premier League defeat to Chelsea. On his third City appearance he received a red card for an aerial challenge with Reading's Steve Sidwell, and was suspended for three matches. However, a knee ligament injury sustained in training resulted in a much longer absence, and he did not make another appearance until mid-December. He then had a run of thirteen consecutive appearances, but was sidelined by injury. Upon his return to fitness he struggled to regain his place in the team, making only one further appearance in the 2006–07 season.

==== Confrontation with Joey Barton ====
On 1 May 2007, Dabo was assaulted by his team mate Joey Barton at City's training ground. Dabo stated that he had been hit several times, and had to go to hospital after suffering injuries to his head during the incident, including a suspected detached retina. Dabo requested that the police press charges against Barton, and as a result, on 16 May 2007, Barton was arrested and questioned by Greater Manchester Police. Barton pleaded guilty to the assault. Barton later claimed on 8 April 2011 that, in fact it was Dabo who started the fight, and he was merely defending himself. After Barton signed for Marseille on 1 September 2012 on a season-long loan, Dabo questioned the arrival of the Englishman at the Rhone club and called his former teammate a coward for constantly hitting him when he was face down on the floor.

=== Return to Lazio ===
He was put on the transfer list by Sven-Göran Eriksson along with team mates Danny Mills and Paul Dickov. Mills and Dickov both ended up going out on loans, but Dabo remained at the club. After just playing the League Cup game on 29 August 2007, he finally re-signed for Lazio on 30 January 2008, costing €263,000. He signed a contract until 30 June 2010. On 13 May 2009, he scored the winning penalty in a penalty shoot-out to give Lazio a 6–5 win after a 1–1 draw, over Sampdoria in the 2009 Coppa Italia Final.

=== New England Revolution ===
After seven months without a club, Dabo signed with Major League Soccer club New England Revolution on 8 February 2011. He made his MLS debut on 7 May 2011 in a game against the Colorado Rapids.

Dabo retired from football on 18 July 2011 after struggling with injuries throughout the 2011 MLS season.

== Career statistics ==
Appearances and goals by club, season and competition
Club	Season	League			Cup (Note: Includes Coupe de France, Coupe de la Ligue, Coppa Italia, FA Cup, EFL Cup and Supercoppa Italiana.)		Continental (Note: Includes UEFA Champions League, UEFA Cup and UEFA Intertoto-Cup.)		Total	
Club	Season	Division	Apps	Goals	Apps	Goals	Apps	Goals	Apps	Goals
Rennes	1995–96	Division 1	5	0	2	0	–		7	0
Rennes	1996–97	Division 1	24	1	–		2	0	26	1
Rennes	1997–98	Division 1	12	1	1	0	–		13	1
Rennes	Total		41	2	3	0	2	0	46	2
Inter Milan	1998–99	Serie A	5	0	3	0	–		8	0
Inter Milan	1999–00	Serie A	8	0	2	0	–		10	0
Inter Milan	Total		13	0	5	0	0	0	18	0
Vicenza (loan)	1998–99	Serie A	13	0	–		–		13	0
Parma	1999–00	Serie A	17	0	–		1	0	18	0
Monaco	2000–01	Division 1	16	0	2	1	4	0	22	1
Vicenza (loan)	2000–01	Serie A	17	1	–		–		17	1
Atalanta	2001–02	Serie A	21	0	3	0	–		24	0
Atalanta	2002–03	Serie A	31	4	1	0	–		32	4
Atalanta	Total		52	4	4	0	0	0	56	4
Lazio	2003–04	Serie A	19	0	3	0	1	0	23	0
Lazio	2004–05	Serie A	29	1	2	0	6	0	37	1
Lazio	2005–06	Serie A	31	2	4	0	–		35	2
Lazio	Total		79	3	11	0	7	0	97	3
Manchester City	2006–07	Premier League	13	0	5	0	–		18	0
Lazio	2007–08	Serie A	13	0	2	0	–		15	0
Lazio	2008–09	Serie A	21	1	5	0	–		26	1
Lazio	2009–10	Serie A	12	0	2	0	4	0	18	0
Lazio	Total		46	1	9	0	4	0	59	1
New England	2011	MLS	3	0	–		–		3	0
Career total			310	11	39	1	18	0	367	12

== Honours ==
Lazio

- Coppa Italia: 2003–04, 2008–09
- Supercoppa Italiana: 2009

France

- FIFA Confederations Cup: 2003
