= Cristian Zenoni =

Italian footballer (born 1977)

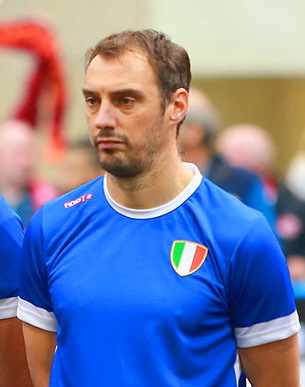
- Zenoni in 2018

Personal information
- Date of birth: 23 April 1977 (age 49)
- Place of birth: Trescore Balneario, Italy
- Height: 1.82 m (6 ft 0 in)
- Position: Full-back

Youth career
- 1994–1996: Atalanta

Senior career*
Years	Team	Apps	(Gls)
1996–2001	Atalanta	120	(2)
1996–1997	→ Pistoiese (loan)	30	(0)
2001	Milan	0	(0)
2001–2005	Juventus	37	(2)
2003–2005	→ Sampdoria (loan)	59	(0)
2005–2008	Sampdoria	86	(1)
2008–2010	Bologna	49	(0)
2010–2011	AlbinoLeffe	32	(1)
2011–2012	Monza	19	(0)

International career
2001–2006	Italy	2	(0)
- * Club domestic league appearances and goals

Cristian Zenoni (Italian pronunciation: [ˈkristjan dzeˈnoːni]; born 23 April 1977) is an Italian former professional footballer who played as a full-back. He is the twin brother of former footballer Damiano Zenoni.

== Club career ==
Zenoni started his career at his native club Atalanta, joining the team's youth system in 1994. After being promoted to the first team, in 1996, Zenoni was loaned to Serie C1 side Pistoiese for a season in order to gain playing time and experience. The following season, he made his Serie A debut with Atalanta on 5 October 1997, in a 1–1 draw against rivals Brescia; in total he made 17 appearances throughout the season. Despite his promising performances for the club, he was unable to help Atalanta avoid relegation to Serie B. He later helped Atalanta gain promotion to Serie A during the 1999–2000 season, and the next season, both he and his brother Damiano established themselves as two of the most exciting young full-backs in the league.

Described by press as a promising young prospect, in June 2001, Cristian transferred to AC Milan along with Massimo Donati for 60 billion Italian lire in a cash plus player deal (the player was majority), but quickly transferred to Juventus as part of Filippo Inzaghi's transfer in the opposite direction, he was tagged for 30 billion Italian lire or about €15.6 million. He signed a five-year contract. In the summer of 2003, Zenoni was loaned to Sampdoria with an option to sign permanently for €10 million. He was loaned out to the club once again in the summer of 2004, and at the end of the 2004–05 season, after almost helping the team qualify for the UEFA Champions League, he was signed permanently by Sampdoria for €1 million.

After several seasons in Genoa, in 2008, Zenoni joined Bologna. In 2010, he moved to AlbinoLeffe, where he remained until 2011. He ended his career after spending the 2011–12 season with Monza, in Lega Pro. In total, he made 546 professional appearances, scoring 10 goals.

== International career ==
After representing the Italy U21 national team three times between 1998 and 1999, Zenoni was capped at senior level for the Italy national team twice, making his debut in a 2–1 friendly home loss against Argentina, on 28 February 2001, under manager Giovanni Trapattoni.

He was recalled by Roberto Donadoni, for his first match as Italy's coach, in August 2006. Zenoni played the friendly match, his second and final Italy appearance losing 2–0 to Croatia on 16 August, as starter.

== Style of play ==
An athletic team player, Zenoni was regarded as a promising young prospect, and as one of the known players in his position in Italy in his youth. He usually played as a right sided full-back, although he was known for his offensive prowess, stamina, and ability to cover the right flank, and was also capable of playing in more advanced positions on occasion, as a right winger.

== Personal life ==
Cristian is the twin brother of former footballer Damiano Zenoni.

== Honours ==
Juventus

- Serie A: 2001–02, 2002–03
- Supercoppa Italiana: 2002
