= 2003–04 Coppa Italia =

Tournament details
- Country: Italy
- Dates: 10 August 2003 – 12 May 2004
- Teams: 48

Final positions
- Champions: Lazio (4th title)
- Runners-up: Juventus

Tournament statistics
- Matches played: 94
- Goals scored: 209 (2.22 per match)
- Top goal scorer: Stefano Fiore (6 goals)

The 2003–04 Coppa Italia was the 57th edition of the tournament. Lazio won the tournament for the 4th time in club history, winning the two-legged final over Juventus on a 4–2 aggregate score.

== Seedings and format ==
In the 2003–04 Coppa Italia there were a total of 48 teams competing: all 18 clubs from Serie A, 23 of the 24 clubs in Serie B, and 7 clubs from Serie C. The only Serie B club not to feature in the competition was ACF Fiorentina, as they had only later been reassigned to Serie B based on sporting merit following the disbarment of Cosenza. The clubs from Serie C included the 4 runners-up from the 2002–03 Serie C promotion playoffs along with the two finalists from the 2002–03 Serie C Coppa Italia competition.

The format for pairings were:

- Group Stage: one-leg fixtures
  - First round: The 32 non-seeded clubs were divided into 8 groups of 4 teams each. Each team played the other three from its group once and the top team from each group advanced to the second round.
    - Points were awarded as 3 points for a win, 1 point for a draw, and 0 points for loss. In the event of a tie at the conclusion of this stage, the group goes to the team with the best goal difference in the match, otherwise the best overall goal difference.
- Knockout Rounds: two-leg fixtures
  - Second round: Clubs 9–14 from Serie A and the top two clubs from Serie B were paired against the 8 advancing teams from the group stage.
  - Round of 16: Teams 1–8 from Serie A were paired against the 8 winners of the second round
  - Quarterfinals, Semifinals and Finals: Two-leg fixtures with pairings based upon bracket

== Group stage ==
To protest against the enlargement of Serie B to 24 teams, many clubs chose to forfeit games in the group phase of this year's competition and many games were not played. All forfeiting teams were given a 3–0 defeat and deducted 1 point in the table for each game not played. Forfeiting teams are indicated in italics.

=== Group 1 ===
Pos	Team	Pld	W	D	L	GF	GA	GD	Pts
1	Pro Patria (C)	3	2	0	1	6	2	+4	6
2	Cagliari (B)	3	1	0	2	2	6	−4	1
3	Piacenza (B)	3	1	0	2	2	6	−4	1
4	Como (B)	3	0	0	3	0	8	−8	−2

Team #1	Team #2	Results
Pro Patria	Cagliari	0–2
Piacenza	Como	2–0
Como	Pro Patria	0–3 to forfeit
Cagliari	Piacenza	0–3 to both from forfeit
Como	Cagliari	0–3 to both from forfeit
Pro Patria	Piacenza	3–0 to forfeit

=== Group 2 ===
Pos	Team	Pld	W	D	L	GF	GA	GD	Pts
1	Cesena (C)	3	1	2	0	5	2	+3	5
2	Genoa (B)	3	1	1	1	4	2	+2	4
3	Torino (B)	3	1	0	2	1	6	−5	1
4	Livorno (B)	3	0	1	2	1	7	−6	−1

Team #1	Team #2	Results
Cesena	Livorno	1–1
Genoa	Torino	0–1
Torino	Cesena	0–3 to forfeit
Livorno	Genoa	0–3 to forfeit
Torino	Livorno	0–3 to both from forfeit
Cesena	Genoa	1–1

=== Group 3 ===
Pos	Team	Pld	W	D	L	GF	GA	GD	Pts
1	Palermo (B)	3	1	0	2	2	2	0	1
2	Hellas Verona (B)	3	1	0	2	1	6	−5	1
3	Treviso (B)	3	0	0	3	0	7	−7	−2
4	AlbinoLeffe (B)	3	0	0	3	0	8	−8	−2

Team #1	Team #2	Results
Hellas Verona	Treviso	1–0
Palermo	AlbinoLeffe	2–0
AlbinoLeffe	Hellas Verona	0–3 to both from forfeit
Treviso	Palermo	0–3 to both from forfeit
AlbinoLeffe	Treviso	0–3 to both from forfeit
Hellas Verona	Palermo	0–3 to both from forfeit

=== Group 4 ===
Pos	Team	Pld	W	D	L	GF	GA	GD	Pts
1	Venezia (B)	3	1	0	2	2	6	−4	1
2	Triestina (B)	3	0	1	2	1	7	−6	−1
3	Vicenza (B)	3	0	1	2	1	7	−6	−1
4	Atalanta (B)	3	0	0	3	0	8	−8	−2

Team #1	Team #2	Results
Venezia	Atalanta	2–0
Triestina	Vicenza	1–1
Vicenza	Venezia	0–3 to both from forfeit
Atalanta	Triestina	0–3 to both from forfeit
Vicenza	Atalanta	0–3 to both from forfeit
Venezia	Triestina	0–3 to both from forfeit

=== Group 5 ===
Pos	Team	Pld	W	D	L	GF	GA	GD	Pts
1	Sambenedettese (C)	3	2	1	0	6	2	+4	7
2	Pisa (C)	3	1	1	1	3	4	−1	3
3	Ancona (A)	3	1	0	2	3	5	−2	2
4	Ternana (B)	3	0	0	3	1	8	−7	−2

Team #1	Team #2	Results
Ternana	Sambenedettese	1–2
Ancona	Pisa	0–2
Pisa	Ternana	0–3 to both from forfeit
Sambenedettese	Ancona	3–0 to forfeit
Pisa	Sambenedettese	1–1
Ternana	Ancona	0–3 to forfeit

=== Group 6 ===
Pos	Team	Pld	W	D	L	GF	GA	GD	Pts
1	Teramo (C)	3	2	1	0	8	2	+6	7
2	Bari (B)	3	1	0	2	2	7	−5	1
3	Ascoli (B)	3	0	1	2	2	8	−6	−1
4	Martina (C)	3	0	0	3	1	8	−7	−2

Team #1	Team #2	Results
Ascoli	Teramo	2–2
Martina	Bari	1–2
Bari	Ascoli	0–3 to both from forfeit
Teramo	Martina	3–0 to forfeit
Bari	Teramo	0–3 to forfeit
Ascoli	Martina	0–3 to both from forfeit

=== Group 7 ===
Pos	Team	Pld	W	D	L	GF	GA	GD	Pts
1	Salernitana (B)	3	2	1	0	6	0	+6	7
2	Napoli (B)	3	1	1	1	3	3	0	3
3	Messina (B)	3	1	0	2	2	6	−4	1
4	Pescara (B)	3	0	0	3	0	8	−8	−2

Team #1	Team #2	Results
Salernitana	Napoli	0–0
Messina	Pescara	2–0
Pescara	Salernitana	0–3 to forfeit
Napoli	Messina	0–3 to both from forfeit
Pescara	Napoli	0–3 to forfeit
Salernitana	Messina	3–0 to forfeit

=== Group 8 ===
Pos	Team	Pld	W	D	L	GF	GA	GD	Pts
1	Fiorentina (B)	3	2	1	0	7	1	+6	7
2	Catania (B)	3	2	1	0	7	1	+6	7
3	Lecce (A)	3	1	0	2	1	6	−5	1
4	Avellino (B)	3	0	0	3	0	7	−7	−2

Team #1	Team #2	Results
Avellino	Lecce	0–1
Fiorentina	Catania	1–1
Catania	Avellino	3–0 to forfeit
Lecce	Fiorentina	0–3 to forfeit
Catania	Lecce	3–0 to forfeit
Avellino	Fiorentina	0–3 to forfeit

== Knockout stage ==
Second stage
Pro Patria	0	0	0
Sampdoria	1	3	4
Milan
bye
Roma
bye
Palermo	1	3	4
Brescia Calcio	1	2	3
Sambenedettese	2	0	2
Modena	1	2	3
Lazio
bye
Empoli	0	1	1
Venezia	2	1	3
Parma
bye
Chievo
bye
Cesena	1	2	3
Perugia	2	3	5
Teramo	0	0	0
Siena	1	3	4
Juventus
bye
Fiorentina	3	0	3
Bologna	2	3	5
Udinese
bye
Internazionale
bye
Salernitana	0	0	0
Reggina	2	3	5

Round of 16
Sampdoria	0	0	0
Milan	1	1	2
Roma	1	2	3
Palermo	0	1	1
Modena	0	0	0
Lazio	1	2	3
Venezia	0	1	1
Parma	2	0	2
Chievo	2	0	2
Perugia	1	3	4
Siena	1	1	2
Juventus	2	2	4
Bologna	0	0	0
Udinese	1	3	4
Internazionale	2	1	3
Reggina	2	1	3

Quarter-finals
Milan	2	2	4
Roma	1	1	2
Lazio	2	1	3
Parma	0	1	1
Perugia	1	0	1
Juventus	2	1	3
Udinese	0	1	1
Internazionale	0	3	3

Semi-finals
Milan	1	0	1
Lazio	2	4	6
Juventus	2	2(7p)	4
Internazionale	2	2(6p)	4

Finals
Lazio	2	2	4
Juventus	0	2	2

== Final ==
=== First leg ===
17 March 2004
21:00

Lazio	2–0	Juventus
Fiore 59', 80'

Stadio Olimpico, Rome
Attendance: 62,204
Referee: Pierluigi Collina

=== Second leg ===
12 May 2004
21:00

Juventus	2–2	Lazio
Trezeguet 20'; Del Piero 46'		Corradi 69'; Fiore 86'

Stadio delle Alpi, Turin
Attendance: 38,849
Referee: Gianluca Paparesta

Lazio won 4–2 on aggregate.

== Top goalscorers ==
Rank	Player	Club	Goals
1	(Italy) Stefano Fiore	Lazio	6
2	(Brazil) Adriano	Internazionale	3
2	(Argentina) Julio Cruz	Internazionale	3
2	(Italy) Marco Di Vaio	Juventus	3
2	(Italy) Alessandro Del Piero	Juventus	3
2	(Brazil) Guilherme do Prado	Perugia	3
2	(Italy) David Di Michele	Reggina	3
2	(Honduras) Julio César de León	Reggina	3
2	(Italy) Antonio Criniti	Sambenedettese	3
