= Alex Pinardi =

Italian footballer (born 1980)

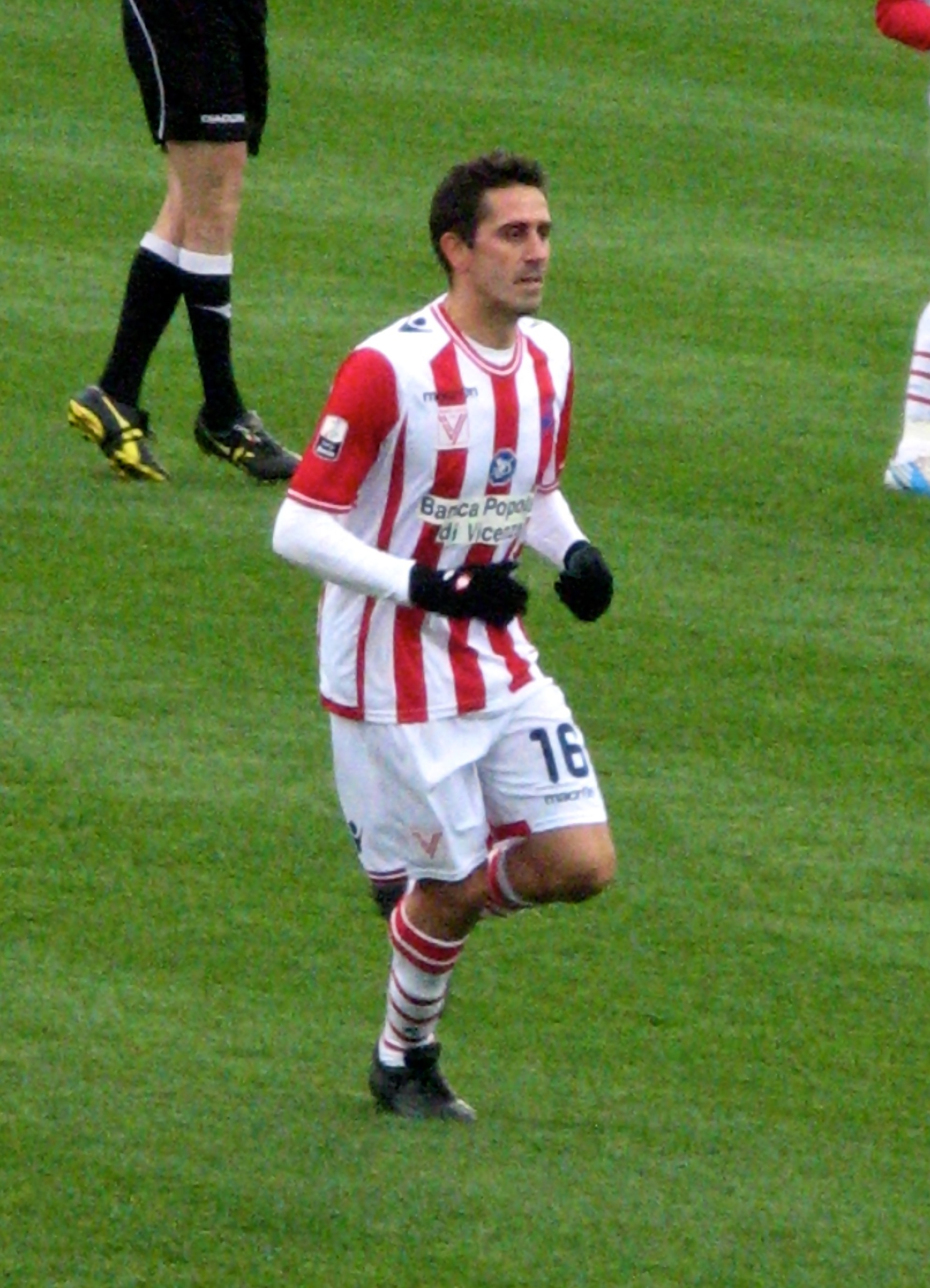

Personal information
- Date of birth: 5 September 1980 (age 46)
- Place of birth: Urago d'Oglio, Italy
- Height: 1.80 m (5 ft 11 in)
- Position: Attacking midfielder

Youth career
- 1994–1997: Atalanta

Senior career*
Years	Team	Apps	(Gls)
1997–2004	Atalanta	100	(15)
2004–2006	Lecce	57	(6)
2006–2010	Modena	85	(24)
2010–2011	Cagliari	7	(0)
2011–2012	Novara	21	(1)
2012	→ Vicenza (loan)	14	(1)
2012–2013	Vicenza	18	(4)
2013	→ Cremonese (loan)	8	(0)
2013–2016	FeralpiSalò	81	(10)
2016–2018	Giana Erminio	46	(6)
2018–2019	Adrense	9	(0)

International career
1996	Italy U-17	3	(0)
2000	Italy U-20	1	(0)
2001	Italy U-21	5	(2)
- * Club domestic league appearances and goals

Alex Pinardi (born 5 September 1980) is an Italian former footballer.

== Career ==
Pinardi began his career in the Primavera team of Atalanta and was, in July 1997, promoted to the Serie A team.

After seven years in the Serie A with Atalanta, he signed in the summer of 2004 for fellow Serie A club Lecce. He scored six goals in 57 games for Lecce and then signed in the summer of 2006 for Modena. On 18 June 2010 Cagliari signed the offensive midfielder from Modena on a two-year contract for free.

After just 7 games, Pinardi was signed by Serie B side Novara for €460,000 fee in a 2 1/2-year contract. On 30 January 2012 he was loaned to Vicenza for the rest of the 2011-12 season, and then sold for the next season. Novara sold Pinardi for €1 million, signing Alain Baclet also for €1 million in exchange. Pinardi signed a 3-year contract.

In January 2013 he was signed by Cremonese in a temporary deal.

On 17 July 2013 Pinardi was signed by FeralpiSalò in a temporary deal. In May 2014 he had an operation on his posterior cruciate ligament. On 23 June 2014 Pinardi was signed outright in a 1-year contract. On 22 May 2015 Pinardi signed a new 1-year contract with FeralpiSalò.

== International career ==
Pinardi played for the Italy national football teams in the U-17 (all in friendlies), U-20 and U-21 levels.
