= Daniele Berretta =

Italian footballer (born 1972)

Personal information
- Date of birth: 8 March 1972 (age 54)
- Place of birth: Rome, Italy
- Height: 1.80 m (5 ft 11 in)
- Position: Midfielder

Senior career*
| Years | Team | Apps | (Gls) |
| 1990–1996 | Roma | 22 | (0) |
| 1992–1993 | → Vicenza (loan) | 26 | (2) |
| 1994–1995 | → Cagliari (loan) | 29 | (1) |
| 1996–2000 | Cagliari | 118 | (13) |
| 2000–2003 | Atalanta | 75 | (5) |
| 2003–2004 | Ancona | 22 | (1) |
| 2004–2005 | Brescia | 8 | (0) |

International career
| 1994 | Italy U-21 | 5 | (0) |
Medal record
Association football
Representing Italy
UEFA European Under-21 Championship
| Winner | 1994 France |
- * Club domestic league appearances and goals

Daniele Berretta (born 8 March 1972) is a retired Italian football player.

He played 12 seasons (240 games, 19 goals) in the Serie A for A.S. Roma, Cagliari Calcio, Atalanta B.C., A.C. Ancona and Brescia Calcio. He played for Roma in the UEFA Cup, scoring a goal against FC Dynamo Moscow in 1996.

After several years with Cagliari, he left for Atalanta after fighting the manager Gianfranco Bellotto during a training session.

== Honours ==
- 1994 UEFA European Under-21 Football Championship winner.
