= Vinicio Espinal =

Dominican football player

Personal information
- Full name: Vinicio Edwards Espinal Marte
- Date of birth: 14 November 1982 (age 43)
- Place of birth: Santo Domingo, Dominican Republic
- Height: 1.78 m (5 ft 10 in)
- Position: Midfielder

Team information
- Current team: Casertana (head coach)

Senior career*
Years	Team	Apps	(Gls)
1999–2004	Atalanta	14	(0)
2003	→ Taranto (loan)	1	(0)
2003–2004	→ Palazzolo (loan)	28	(3)
2004–2007	Monza	81	(13)
2007–2008	Crotone	59	(11)
2009–2011	Portosummaga	72	(3)
2011–2013	Pro Vercelli	46	(2)
2013–2014	Benevento	24	(0)
2014–2015	Unione Venezia	18	(0)
2015–2016	Lecco	6	(0)
2016–2017	Pontisola	48	(2)
2017–2020	Virtus Bergamo	82	(11)
2020–2021	Mapello		

International career
2004–2019	Dominican Republic	5	(0)

Managerial career
- 2021: Mapello
- 2022–2023: Ospitaletto
- 2023: Folgore Caratese
- 2024: Gozzano
- 2024–2025: Real Calepina
- 2025–2026: Giana Erminio
- 2026–: Casertana
- * Club domestic league appearances and goals

Vinicio Edwards Espinal Marte (born 14 November 1982) is a Dominican football coach and a former player who is the head coach of Serie C Group C club Casertana.

A former Serie A player, he is the twin brother of José Espinal and also holds Italian nationality.

== Club career ==
Espinal emigrated to Italy in 1991, where he played with Serie A team Atalanta. He moved to Calcio Portogruaro Summaga in Serie C1 during January 2009.

== International career ==
Espinal is a holding midfielder and has several caps under his belt for the Dominican Republic.

He also holds an Italian passport.

== Coaching career ==
In May 2021, Espinal, while still playing with them, was promoted to head coach of Eccellenza amateurs Mapello.

On 15 July 2021, he left Mapello to accept an offer from Lazio to become a member of Maurizio Sarri's coaching staff.

On 10 June 2022, after having spent a season as an assistant coach for the Lazio Under-19 team, Espinal was announced as the new head coach of Eccellenza amateurs Ospitaletto.

On 31 May 2023, Serie D club Crema announced the hiring of Espinal as their new head coach for the 2023–24 season; however, the appointment was not formalized eventually, and Crema announced later in July to have parted ways with Espinal. A few days later, he was unveiled as the new head coach of fellow Serie D club Folgore Caratese. He was dismissed, together with his assistant and brother José Espinal, on 6 October 2023.

On 1 March 2024, Espinal was hired by Serie D club Gozzano as their new head coach. He left Gozzano by the end of the season after guiding them to safety, then accepting the head coaching role at fellow Serie D club Real Calepina. He departed from Real Calepina by the end of the season, after a positive campaign with the club.

On 24 June 2025, Serie C club Giana Erminio unveiled Espinal as their new head coach for the club's 2025–26 Serie C campaign.

== Honours ==
=== Player ===
Portogruaro

- Serie C1: 2009–10 (Group A)
