= Luciano Zauri =

Italian footballer (born 1978)

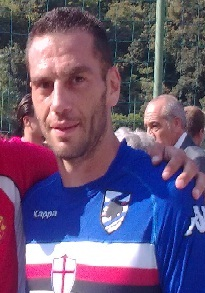
- Zauri in 2009

Personal information
- Full name: Luciano Zauri
- Date of birth: 20 January 1978 (age 48)
- Place of birth: Pescina, L'Aquila, Italy
- Height: 1.78 m (5 ft 10 in)
- Positions: Full-back; wide midfielder

Youth career
- 1994–1996: Atalanta

Senior career*
Years	Team	Apps	(Gls)
1996–2003	Atalanta	153	(2)
1997–1998	→ Chievo (loan)	24	(0)
2003–2013	Lazio	139	(4)
2008–2009	→ Fiorentina (loan)	18	(1)
2009–2011	→ Sampdoria (loan)	59	(0)
2013–2014	Pescara	24	(0)
Total		417	(7)

International career
1995	Italy U17	6	(0)
1995–1996	Italy U18	9	(0)
2001–2006	Italy	5	(0)

Managerial career
- 2019–2020: Pescara
- 2022: Pescara
- 2023–2024: Ħamrun Spartans
- 2024–2025: Foggia
- 2025–2026: Campobasso
- * Club domestic league appearances and goals

Luciano Zauri (Italian pronunciation: [luˈtʃaːno dˈdzauri]; born 20 January 1978) is an Italian football coach and a former player who played as a full-back or wide midfielder on either flank.

== Club career ==
=== Atalanta ===
Zauri made his debut in Serie A in the 1996–97 season with Atalanta in a 4–0 loss at home to Roma.

He spent the following season with Chievo Verona before returning to Bergamo with Atalanta in the 1998–99 season. Zauri then spent the following five seasons with Atalanta, three of which were in Serie A and two in Serie B.

=== Lazio ===
In 2003, following Atalanta's relegation, Zauri, along with teammate Ousmane Dabo, was sold to Lazio, Lazio paid €5.65 million to acquire Zauri. With Lazio, Zauri won the 2003–04 edition of the Coppa Italia.

He became a regular at Lazio and evolved into a leader on the pitch. In January 2007, following the sale of World Cup winner and captain Massimo Oddo to Milan, Zauri was chosen as the new captain.

Zauri played a pivotal role in helping the club reach the 2007–08 UEFA Champions League and scored his first goal in the competition in the 1–1 draw to Olympiacos. His contract with Lazio expired in the summer of 2007, and he was subsequently offered a new five-year contract, which he eventually re-signed with the club.

In the summer of 2008, he was loaned to Fiorentina with the option to buy out the player. He played all 10 European matches for Viola.

=== Sampdoria ===
On 10 July 2009, Zauri moved to U.C. Sampdoria on a loan deal with the option to buy out the player. He played in the right-back position ahead of Marius Stankevičius but sometimes moved to left-back, such as in a 2–0 loss to Fiorentina in September, ahead of Reto Ziegler as left-back and Stankevičius as starting right-back.

Zauri returned to Lazio on 1 July 2010 and played a few friendlies for the club as full-back Aleksandar Kolarov was sold. Sampdoria loaned him in again on 19 August. As a consequence Stankevičius was loaned to Valencia from Genoa.

=== Pescara ===
During the 2013 winter transfer window, Zauri joined Pescara. At the end of the 2013–14 season, he retired from professional football. In total, he made 432 appearances throughout his career, including 301 in Serie A, scoring seven goals.

== International career ==
Zauri made five appearances with the Italy national team. He made his Azzurri debut on 5 September 2001 against Morocco. He then played the first match after the 2002 FIFA World Cup, a friendly match against Slovenia. He also played twice at UEFA Euro 2004 qualifying matches as a starter in October 2002. However, after he played the friendly match against Turkey on 20 November 2002, he never played for Azzurri again, although he was called up to the first match after the 2006 FIFA World Cup, a friendly match against Croatia, by new coach Roberto Donadoni.

== Coaching career ==
After retirement, Zauri entered into coaching as assistant to Massimo Oddo at Pescara. After Oddo's dismissal from the club in February 2017, he served as caretaker manager for three days as the club searched for a replacement, without taking charge of any games during this period. He left Pescara on 17 February 2017, following the appointment of Zdeněk Zeman as new head coach.

He successively returned to Pescara, serving as Under-19 coach in the 2018–19 season. On 5 June 2019, Zauri was announced to have been promoted as the new head coach of Pescara, taking over from Giuseppe Pillon. He resigned as head coach on 20 January 2020, following a loss to Salernitana.

On 6 April 2022, Zauri returned to Pescara, this time in Serie C, replacing outgoing manager Gaetano Auteri.

On 25 April 2023, he was announced as Head Coach of Ħamrun Spartans, replacing outgoing manager Branko Nišević. With the club, he won a Maltese national title in 2024, after which he opted to depart in order to move back to Italy.

On 7 November 2024, Zauri accepted the coaching post at Serie C club Foggia. He left Foggia by the end of the season, successively signing for fellow Serie C club Campobasso.

== Honours ==
=== Player ===
Lazio

- Coppa Italia: 2003–04

=== Manager ===
Ħamrun Spartans

- Maltese Premier League: 2023–24
