= Damiano Zenoni =

Italian footballer (born 1977)

Personal information
- Date of birth: 23 April 1977 (age 49)
- Place of birth: Trescore Balneario, Italy
- Height: 1.85 m (6 ft 1 in)
- Positions: Right-back; right wing-back; right winger

Senior career*
Years	Team	Apps	(Gls)
1994–2005	Atalanta	209	(8)
1996–1997	→ Pistoiese (loan)	26	(0)
1997–1998	→ Alzano Virescit (loan)	31	(1)
2005–2007	Udinese	68	(0)
2007–2010	Parma	68	(1)
2011	Piacenza	20	(0)

International career
2000	Italy	1	(0)

Managerial career
- 2012–2014: Grumellese (youth)
- 2014–2019: Feralpisalò (youth)
- 2019: Feralpisalò
- * Club domestic league appearances and goals

Damiano Zenoni (Italian pronunciation: [daˈmjaːno ddzeˈnoːni]; born 23 April 1977) is an Italian football manager and former player, who played as a midfielder or defender.

He was capable of playing anywhere in midfield or defence, although he usually played on the right flank as a winger, wing-back, or right-back; he also occasionally played on the left. He is the twin brother of former footballer Cristian Zenoni.

== Club career ==
=== Early career ===
Damiano Zenoni began his career with the Atalanta youth side, and was later promoted to the club's senior side. He was initially sent on loan to Pistoiese and Alzano Virescit for the 1996–97 and 1997–98 seasons in order to gain experience and playing time. After helping Atalanta back to the top Italian division, Zenoni made his Serie A debut with Atalanta on 1 October 2000, against S.S. Lazio, and along with his brother, Cristian, established himself as one of the most promising young full-backs in the league throughout the 2000–01 season.

In 2005, he joined Udinese under the Bosman ruling, leaving Atalanta five months before his contract had ended. He signed a four-year deal which would keep him at his new club until 2009. Atalanta promoted Marco Motta from the youth team to the first team to play Zenoni's position.

=== Parma ===
In the summer of 2007, Parma signed Zenoni for €3 million in a three-year deal, while Damiano Ferronetti moved to Udinese for €2 million.

=== Piacenza ===
In January 2011, Zenoni joined Piacenza Calcio for the remainder of the 2010–11 season.

== International career ==
Zenoni made his only appearance for the Italian senior team in a 1–0 friendly home win against England on 15 November 2000, under manager Giovanni Trapattoni.

== Coaching career ==
On 7 May 2019, Zenoni was appointed the head coach of Serie C club Feralpisalò, where he already worked with the youth team. On 25 September 2019, he was fired by the club following a 3–1 loss to Fano.

== Personal life ==
Zenoni is the twin brother of former footballer Cristian Zenoni.
