= Cristiano Doni =

Italian footballer (born 1973)

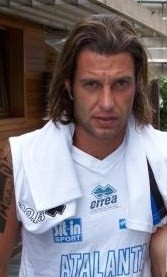
- Doni in 2009

Personal information
- Date of birth: 1 April 1973 (age 53)
- Place of birth: Rome, Italy
- Height: 1.86 m (6 ft 1 in)
- Position: Midfielder

Senior career*
Years	Team	Apps	(Gls)
1991–1992	Modena	0	(0)
1992–1993	Rimini	31	(6)
1993–1994	Pistoiese	31	(3)
1994–1996	Bologna	54	(11)
1996–1998	Brescia	51	(8)
1998–2003	Atalanta	145	(55)
2003–2005	Sampdoria	44	(7)
2005–2006	Mallorca	24	(2)
2006–2011	Atalanta	151	(48)
Total		531	(140)

International career
2001–2002	Italy	7	(1)
- * Club domestic league appearances and goals

Cristiano Doni (Italian pronunciation: [kriˈstjaːno ˈdoːni]; born 1 April 1973) is an Italian former professional footballer who played as an attacking midfielder, on either flank or in the middle.

Most of his professional career (which spanned two decades) was associated with Atalanta, as he played in more than 300 official games for the club and scored more than 100 goals. He amassed Serie A totals of 266 matches and 77 goals over the course of ten seasons, also representing in the competition Brescia and Sampdoria.

Doni appeared for Italy at the 2002 World Cup.

== Club career ==
Born in Rome, Doni started playing professionally for Modena at age 18, subsequently moving on to Rimini, Pistoiese and Bologna.

He made his Serie A debut in 1997–98 for Brescia against Inter Milan, moving after two years to Bergamo with Atalanta. He quickly made a name for himself at the club with his hard-working style, combined with scoring ability, and netted in double digits in three out of five seasons.

After two seasons at Sampdoria, Doni had his first experience abroad aged 32, signing with Spain's Mallorca. After just one season, he returned to his main team even though he had another year running at the Balearic Islands side, asking to be released so he could accept Atalanta's offer although he took a pay cut in the process.

Doni eventually signed a two-year contract, then proceeded to continue, in spite of his age, to be an indispensable offensive unit – 34 league goals in his first three years combined – as well as team captain. In 2010–11, the 37-year-old scored 12 Serie B goals as Atalanta returned to the top division after one year, as champions.

On 9 August 2011, Doni was banned from football for 3 1/2 years for his role in match fixing during the campaign, effectively ending his career at the age of 38. On 19 December, he was arrested together with 16 other people in connection with another match-fixing and betting investigation.

== International career ==
Doni played seven times for Italy, the first cap arriving on 7 November 2001 as he found the net in a 1–1 friendly with Japan. Subsequently, he was picked for the squad at the 2002 FIFA World Cup by manager Giovanni Trapattoni, making two starting appearances throughout the tournament, the opening 2–0 win against Ecuador and the subsequent 2–1 defeat to Croatia where he provided the assist for Christian Vieri.

== Style of play ==
Doni was known for his vision, technical ability and creativity as an offensive midfield playmaker. He was capable of scoring and assisting alike, due to his powerful and accurate mid-range shot.

== Honours ==
Bologna

- Serie C1: 1994–95
- Serie B: 1995–96

Brescia

- Serie B: 1996–97

Atalanta

- Serie B: 2010–11

Individual

- Premio Nazionale Carriera Esemplare "Gaetano Scirea": 2009
