= Cosimo Bolognino =

Italian football referee

- Born: 30 January 1959 (age 67); Siderno, Italy

Domestic
Years	League	Role
1993–2004	Serie A	Referee

International
Years	League	Role
1999–2004	FIFA listed	Referee

Cosimo Bolognino (born 30 January 1959 in Siderno, Italy) is a former Italian professional football referee. He was a full international for FIFA from 1999 until 2004.
