= Massimo Donati =

Italian football manager (born 1981)

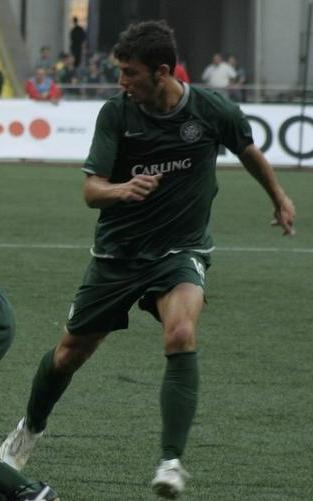
- Donati playing for Celtic in 2007

Personal information
- Full name: Massimo Donati
- Date of birth: 26 March 1981 (age 45)
- Place of birth: San Vito al Tagliamento, Italy
- Height: 1.88 m (6 ft 2 in)
- Position: Midfielder

Youth career
- 1998–1999: Atalanta

Senior career*
Years	Team	Apps	(Gls)
1999–2001	Atalanta	46	(2)
2001–2007	AC Milan	17	(0)
2002–2003	→ Parma (loan)	7	(1)
2003	→ Torino (loan)	17	(4)
2003–2004	→ Sampdoria (loan)	19	(0)
2004–2006	→ Messina (loan)	67	(2)
2006–2007	→ Atalanta (loan)	32	(1)
2007–2009	Celtic	31	(3)
2009–2012	Bari	82	(4)
2012–2013	Palermo	46	(2)
2013–2014	Hellas Verona	20	(1)
2014–2016	Bari	51	(3)
2016–2018	Hamilton Academical	41	(2)
2018	St Mirren	1	(0)
Total		475	(25)

International career
1998	Italy U16	9	(1)
1999–2000	Italy U18	7	(0)
2000	Italy U20	1	(0)
2000–2004	Italy U21	26	(1)

Managerial career
- 2021: Sambenedettese
- 2022–2024: Legnago Salus
- 2024: Athens Kallithea
- 2025: Sampdoria
- * Club domestic league appearances and goals

Massimo Donati (born 26 March 1981) is an Italian professional football manager, pundit and former player who played as a midfielder.

Born in San Vito al Tagliamento, Italy, Donati made 314 appearances in Serie A for several clubs, including Atalanta, AC Milan, Bari, and Palermo, plus another 72 appearances in the Scottish Premier League with Celtic — where he won the league and Scottish Cup — and Hamilton.

Donati represented Italy at Under-16, Under-18, Under-20 and Under-21 levels.

== Playing career ==
=== Atalanta and Milan ===
Donati started his club career at Atalanta, before moving to AC Milan in June 2001 along with Cristian Zenoni for 60 billion lire in a cash-plus-player deal. However, due to the competition at the club, Donati was unable to retain a first team place after his first season, spending the 2002–03 season on loan at Parma and then Torino.

The 2003–04 season, his third as a Milan player, saw him join Sampdoria on loan, before enjoying a successful spell at Messina for the 2004–05 and 2005–06 seasons. Despite finding his form at Messina, Donati still found himself out of favour at Milan and was again sent on loan, this time returning to his first club Atalanta for the 2006–07 season.

Donati was a youth international, representing Italy at under-16, under-18, under-20 and under-21 levels.

=== Celtic ===
On 29 June 2007, Celtic confirmed the signing of Donati on a four-year contract for a fee of €2 million. Donati was given the number 18 jersey, vacated by ex-captain Neil Lennon and was unveiled at Celtic Park. He made his Celtic debut in their first league game of the season on 5 August, a 0–0 draw with Kilmarnock. In Celtic's next league game against Falkirk, Donati was involved in his side's equaliser when his shot hit Kenny Milne and went into the net; Celtic won the game 4–1. The following week, Donati grabbed his first competitive Celtic goal with an equalising goal against Aberdeen and later added an assist for Kenny Miller as Celtic won 3–1.

On 28 November, Donati won the match for Celtic in the UEFA Champions League fixture against Shakhtar Donetsk, netting in the 92nd minute to win the match 2–1. This result meant Celtic only needed a point away to Donati's former club Milan at the San Siro to qualify for the last 16 stage of the tournament. Celtic lost 1–0 to Milan, but still qualified for the last 16 as runners-up in their group after Benfica defeated Shakhtar in Ukraine. As the season went on, Donati's form began to dip, resulting in the central midfield positions being changed with Barry Robson and Paul Hartley in place of Donati and Scott Brown. In May 2008, it was reported that Donati wanted to go back to Serie A.

In the 2008–09 season, Donati made only a handful of appearances for Celtic, though he started in the home game against Kilmarnock on 12 November 2008 and won the man of the match award.

After the appointment of Tony Mowbray as Celtic manager, Donati won back his place in the Celtic midfield alongside new signing Landry N'Guémo. Donati played in most of the pre-season games and scored in a 5–0 win over African Champions League winners Al-Ahly in the Wembley Cup. He started the 2009–10 campaign in fine form and scored from a spectacular volley in Celtic's 3–1 loss to Arsenal in the Champions League play-off.

=== Bari ===
On 27 August 2009, Donati left Celtic and signed a four-year contract with Serie A newcomers Bari.

=== Palermo ===
On 18 January 2012, Donati left Bari for Palermo in Serie A.

=== Hellas Verona ===
In June 2013, Donati was signed by Hellas Verona.

=== Bari ===
On 26 August 2014, Donati returned to Bari. He scored his first goal in the 2014–15 Serie B season on 13 September 2014, during a 1–1 draw with Frosinone.

=== Hamilton Academical ===
On 18 July 2016, Donati returned to Scotland to sign for Hamilton Academical. He scored on his debut as Hamilton won 3–0 against St Mirren in the Scottish League Cup. On 9 November 2016, Donati signed a new contract, keeping him at the club until 2019.

In January 2018, Hamilton announced that they had agreed with Donati to cancel his existing playing contract, for him to begin a coaching career. Donati had also been coaching the Hamilton under-15 team.

=== St Mirren ===
Donati signed a short-term contract with St Mirren in February 2018. He was released by St Mirren at the end of this contract.

== Media career ==
In 2018, Donati was unveiled as a new color commentator and pundit for DAZN, a role he left in June 2021 following his appointment as Sambenedettese's new head coach.

He briefly resumed his role at DAZN between August and September 2021, leaving again after Sambenedettese was successfully readmitted into Serie D.

== Managerial career ==
=== Early career ===
In June 2019, Donati joined the coaching staff at Kilmarnock under Angelo Alessio.

On 25 June 2021, he was appointed as the new head coach of Sambenedettese. The club, originally scheduled to play Serie C in the 2021–22 season, was successively demoted to Serie D due to financial irregularities; nevertheless, in September 2021 Donati was confirmed he would stay at Sambenedettese also in the lower tier. On 31 October 2021, Donati was dismissed from his role following a negative start in the club's Serie D campaign.

=== Legnago Salus ===
On 16 June 2022, Donati was appointed as the new manager of Legnago Salus, who had just been relegated to Serie D. After winning the Serie D Group B title and leading Legnago back to Serie C after one season, he was confirmed in charge of the club.

In the 2023–24 Serie C season, Legnago made a surprising sixth-place finish and qualified for the promotion playoffs. From 4 November, Donati's side would lose only two matches, including one to eventual champions Mantova. Until 13 April, Legnago were Italy's only unbeaten team in the calendar year 2024. In the 2023–24 Serie C promotion playoffs, Legnago defeated Lumezzane in the first round but were eliminated in the second round with a 1–1 draw away to Atalanta U23, as a result of being the lower seed.

=== Athens Kallithea ===
On 12 June 2024, Donati was appointed as manager of newly promoted Super League Greece side Athens Kallithea. He was sacked on 13 December 2024 due to negative results.

=== Sampdoria ===
On 13 July 2025, Donati was unveiled as the new head coach of Serie B club Sampdoria.

His stint at Sampdoria, however, turned out to be disappointing, with the fallen giants down to the bottom of the league by October, ending with a dismissal from his role on 18 October 2025, after a 1–3 loss against Virtus Entella.

== Career statistics ==
As of match played 17 April 2018

Appearances and goals by club, season and competition
Club	Season	League			National cup		League cup		Continental		Other		Total	
Club	Season	Division	Apps	Goals	Apps	Goals	Apps	Goals	Apps	Goals	Apps	Goals	Apps	Goals
Atalanta	1999–00	Serie B	20	1	1	0	–		–		–		21	1
Atalanta	2000–01	Serie A	26	1	7	1	–		–		–		33	2
Atalanta	Total		46	2	8	1	–		–		–		54	3
AC Milan	2001–02	Serie A	17	0	3	0	–		7	0	–		27	0
Parma (loan)	2002–03	Serie A	7	1	2	0	–		2	0	1 (Note: Appearance in Supercoppa Italiana)	0	12	1
Torino (loan)	2002–03	Serie A	17	4	0	0	–		0	0	–		17	4
Sampdoria (loan)	2003–04	Serie A	19	0	4	0	–		–		–		23	0
Messina (loan)	2004–05	Serie A	34	1	1	0	–		–		–		35	1
Messina (loan)	2005–06	Serie A	33	1	0	0	–		–		–		33	1
Messina (loan)	Total		67	2	1	0	–		–		–		68	2
Atalanta (loan)	2006–07	Serie A	32	1	2	1	–		–		–		34	2
Celtic	2007–08	Scottish Premier League	25	3	2	0	0	0	10	1	–		37	4
Celtic	2008–09	Scottish Premier League	4	0	1	0	1	0	1	0	–		7	0
Celtic	2009–10	Scottish Premier League	2	0	0	0	0	0	4	1	–		6	1
Celtic	Total		31	3	3	0	1	0	15	2	–		50	5
Bari	2009–10	Serie A	32	1	0	0	–		–		–		32	1
Bari	2010–11	Serie A	31	1	1	0	–		–		–		32	1
Bari	2011–12	Serie B	19	2	3	1	–		–		–		22	3
Bari	Total		82	4	4	1	–		–		–		86	5
Palermo	2011–12	Serie A	18	2	0	0	–		0	0	–		18	2
Palermo	2012–13	Serie A	28	0	2	0	–		–		–		30	0
Palermo	Total		46	2	2	0	–		0	0	–		48	2
Hellas Verona	2013–14	Serie A	20	1	2	0	–		–		–		22	1
Bari	2014–15	Serie B	35	2	0	0	–		–		–		35	2
Bari	2015–16	Serie B	16	1	1	0	–		–		–		17	1
Bari	Total		51	3	1	0	–		–		–		52	3
Hamilton Academical	2016–17	Scottish Premiership	31	2	4	0	4	1	–		1 (Note: Appearance in SPFL play-offs)	0	40	3
Hamilton Academical	2017–18	Scottish Premiership	10	0	1	0	2	1	–		–		13	1
Hamilton Academical	Total		41	2	5	0	6	2	–		1	0	53	4
St Mirren	2017–18	Scottish Championship	1	0	0	0	0	0	0	0	0	0	1	0
Career total			477	25	37	3	7	2	24	2	2	0	547	32

== Honours ==
=== Player ===
Celtic

- Scottish Premier League: 2007–08
- Scottish League Cup: 2008–09
