= List of Italian football transfers summer 2010 (July) =

This is a list of Italian football transfers for the 2010–11 season. Only moves from Serie A and Serie B are listed.

The summer transfer window ran from 1 July 2010, the end of the 2009–10 season, with a few transfers taking place prior to the season's complete end. The window closed on 31 August 19:00 (Milan Time). The mid-season transfer window opened on 3 January 2011, and ran for the entire month, until 31 January. Players without a club may join one, either during or in between transfer windows.

On 2 July 2010, FIGC announced only one new non-EU signing from abroad could be registered, instead of two in previous season; they were marked yellow. Juventus, which the team originally had two quota (Amauri and Martín Cáceres), now only had one.

== Summer transfer window ==
Date	Name	Nationality	Moving from	Moving to	Fee
2009-11-21^{1}	Rolf Feltscher	Switzerland	(Switzerland) Grasshopper	Parma	Free
2010-01-24^{1}	Panagiotis Tachtsidis	Greece	(Greece) AEK	Genoa	Free
2010-01-27^{1}	Fábio Simplício	Brazil	Palermo	Roma	Free
2010-02-01^{1}	Gergely Rudolf	Hungary	(Hungary) Debreceni	Genoa	Free
2010-02-04^{1}	Mehdi Benatia	Morocco	(France) Clermont	Udinese	Undisclosed
2010-02-22^{1}	Manuel Scavone	Italy	South Tyrol	Novara	Undisclosed
2010-02-27^{1}	Luca Castellazzi	Italy	Sampdoria	Internazionale	Free
2010-03-05^{1}	Diego Ângelo	Brazil	(Portugal) Naval	Genoa	Free
2010-03-18^{1}	Mario Yepes	Colombia	Chievo	Milan	Free
2010-03-23^{1}	Almen Abdi	Switzerland	(France) Le Mans	Udinese	Undisclosed
2010-04-09	Victor	Brazil	Frosinone	(Russia) Amkar Perm	Free
2010-04-13^{1}	Abdou Doumbia	France	Santegidiese (amateur)	Parma	Free
2010-04-20	Fabiano	Brazil	Genoa	(Brazil) Guarani	Free
2010-04-29	Ondřej Mazuch	Czech Republic	Fiorentina	(Belgium) Anderlecht	Undisclosed
2010-05-20	Marko Stanković	Austria	Triestina	Austria Wien	Undisclosed
2010-05-21	Bojan Jokić	Slovenia	(France) Sochaux	Chievo	Undisclosed
2010-05-22^{1}	Boštjan Cesar	Slovenia	(France) Grenoble	Chievo	Free
2010-06-01^{1}	Cristian Molinaro	Italy	Juventus	(Germany) Stuttgart	€3.9M
2010-06-02^{1}	Fabio Cannavaro	Italy	Juventus	(United Arab Emirates) Al Ahli Dubai	Free
2010-06-03	Gaetano D'Agostino	Italy	Udinese	Fiorentina	Co-ownership, €5.75M
2010-06-03	Pablo Daniel Osvaldo	Italy	Bologna	(Spain) Espanyol	Loan
2010-06-03	Dragan Mihajlović	Switzerland	Parma	(Switzerland) Bellinzona	€10,000
2010-06-04	Niki Zimling	Denmark	Udinese	(Netherlands) NEC	Loan
2010-06-05^{1}	Thomas Hitzlsperger	Germany	Lazio	(England) West Ham United	Free
2010-06-07	Pajtim Kasami	Switzerland	(Switzerland) Bellinzona	Palermo	€0.3M
2010-06-08^{1}	Adriano	Brazil	(Brazil) Flamengo	Roma	Free
2010-06-08^{1}	Christian Esposito	Australia	AlbinoLeffe	Novara	Free
2010-06-09^{1}	Simone Pepe	Italy	Udinese	Juventus	Loan, €2.6M
2010-06-09	Roberto Vitiello	Italy	Rimini	Siena	Free
2010-06-10	Gabriele Paonessa	Italy	Bologna	Parma	Co-ownership, €0.6M (player exchange)
2010-06-10	Daniele Paponi	Italy	Parma	Bologna	Co-ownership, €0.6M (player exchange)
2010-06-10^{1}	Lukáš Jarolím	Czech Republic	Siena	(Czech Republic) Slavia Prague	Free
2010-06-11	Mauricio Pinilla	Chile	Grosseto	Palermo	€3M
2010-06-11	Marco Giovio	Italy	Palermo	Grosseto	Co-ownership, Undisclosed
2020-06-13	Simone Salviato	Italy	Mantova	Livorno	Free
2010-06-13	Ricardo Quaresma	Portugal	Internazionale	(Turkey) Beşiktaş	€7.3M
2010-06-15	Massimo Maccarone	Italy	Siena	Palermo	€4.5M
2010-06-16	Francesco Marianini	Italy	Empoli	Novara	Free
2010-06-16	Igor Djuric	Switzerland	Udinese	(Switzerland) Kriens	
2010-06-17	Tiberio Guarente	Italy	Atalanta	(Spain) Sevilla	€5M
2010-06-15	Alex Pinardi	Italy	Modena	Cagliari	Free
2010-06-19	Leandro Caruso	Argentina	Udinese	(Argentina) River Plate	Loan
2010-06-19	Lucas Simón	Argentina	Piacenza	(Argentina) Tigre	Loan
2010-06-21^{1}	Ledian Memushaj	Albania	Paganese	Chievo	Free
2010-06-21	Lorenzo Ariaudo	Italy	Juventus	Cagliari	Co-ownership, €1.3M
2010-06-21	Radja Nainggolan	Belgium	Piacenza	Cagliari	Co-ownership, Undisclosed
2010-06-21	Sergio Floccari	Italy	Genoa	Lazio	€8.5M
2010-06-22	Marco Parolo	Italy	Chievo	Cesena	Co-ownership, €0.3M
2010-06-22	Antonio Mazzotta	Italy	Palermo	Lecce	Co-ownership, €0.7M
2010-06-22	Stefano Layeni	Italy	Prato	AlbinoLeffe	Loan
2010-06-22	Felice Piccolo	Italy	Empoli	(Romania) Cluj	Undisclosed
2010-06-22	Nicola Pozzi	Italy	Empoli	Sampdoria	€5.2M
2010-06-22	Roberto Soriano	Italy	Sampdoria	Empoli	Loan
2010-06-22^{1}	Marco Storari	Italy	Milan	Juventus	€4.5M
2010-06-23	Marco Amelia	Italy	Genoa	Milan	Loan
2010-06-23	Savio	Germany	Fiorentina	(Germany) 1860 Munich	Loan
2010-06-23	Dominique Malonga	France	Torino	Cesena	Co-ownership, €0.75M
2010-06-23	Massimo Coda	Italy	Bologna	Cremonese	Co-ownership, €0.15M
23 June 2010	Antimo Iunco	Italy	Chievo	Cittadella	Co-ownership, €0.5M
2010-06-23	Jonathan Rossini	Switzerland	Udinese	Sampdoria	Loan
24 June 2010	Saša Bjelanović	Croatia	Vicenza	(Romania) Cluj	€250,000
24 June 2010	Emanuele Testardi	Italy	Pescara	Sampdoria	€450,000 (€150,000 + Soddimo)
24 June 2010	Riccardo Bocalon	Italy	Internazionale	Portogruaro	Loan
24 June 2010	Ezequiel Schelotto	Italy	Atalanta	Cesena	Loan
24 June 2010	Fabio Caserta	Italy	Atalanta	Cesena	Loan
24 June 2010	Maximiliano Pellegrino	Argentina	Atalanta	Cesena	Loan
24 June 2010	Ramzi Aya	Italy	Fiorentina	Reggiana	Co-ownership, €200,000
24 June 2010	Samuele Bettoni	Italy	Fiorentina	Reggiana	Co-ownership, €500
24 June 2010	Mattia Minesso	Italy	Vicenza	Chievo	Co-ownership, €1M (swap with A.Benedetti)
24 June 2010	Mattia Minesso	Italy	Chievo	Vicenza	Loan
24 June 2010	Amedeo Benedetti	Italy	Chievo	Vicenza	Co-ownership, €1M (swap with Minesso)
24 June 2010	Sergio Almirón	Argentina	Juventus	Bari	Co-ownership, €2.5M
24 June 2010	Robert Gucher	Austria	Frosinone	Genoa	Co-ownership, €1.3M (player exchange)
24 June 2010	Robert Gucher	Austria	Genoa	Frosinone	Loan
24 June 2010	Selim Ben Djemia	Tunisia	Genoa	Frosinone	Loan, €100,000 (player swap)
24 June 2010	Salvatore Mastronunzio	Italy	Ancona	Siena	€2.15M
24 June 2010	Gennaro Troianiello	Italy	Frosinone	Siena	€2M
24 June 2010	Gianluca Sansone	Italy	Siena	Frosinone	Co-ownership, €400,000
24 June 2010	Sasà Margarita	Italy	Ascoli	Catania	Co-ownership, €1.3M (part of Moretti)
24 June 2010	Giorgio Capece	Italy	Ascoli	Catania	Co-ownership, €700,000 (part of Moretti)
24 June 2010	Federico Moretti	Italy	Catania	Ascoli	Co-ownership, €2M (Capece+Margarita)
2010-06-24	Sasà Margarita	Italy	Catania	Ascoli	Loan
2010-06-24	Giorgio Capece	Italy	Catania	Ascoli	Loan
2010-06-25	Daniele Sciarra	Italy	Roma	Aversa	Co-ownership, Undisclosed
25 June 2010	Antonio Mirante	Italy	Sampdoria	Parma	€3.6M
25 June 2010	Matteo Arati	Italy	Fiorentina	Reggiana	Loan
25 June 2010	Paulo Vitor Barreto	Brazil	Udinese	Bari	Co-ownership, €4.5M
25 June 2010	Blerim Džemaili	Switzerland	Torino	Parma	Co-ownership, €3.5M
25 June 2010	Aleandro Rosi	Italy	Siena	Roma	Loan (between co-owner)
25 June 2010	Nicola Belmonte	Italy	Siena	Bari	Loan (between co-owner)
25 June 2010	Daniele Cacia	Italy	Lecce	Piacenza	Loan
25 June 2010	Migjen Basha	Switzerland	Frosinone	Atalanta	€2.28M
25 June 2010	Giulio Donati	Italy	Internazionale	Lecce	Loan
25 June 2010	Davide Lanzafame	Italy	Palermo	Juventus	Loan (between co-owner)
25 June 2010	Giorgio Frezzolini	Italy	Ascoli	Atalanta	€30,000
25 June 2010	Federico Vismara	Argentina	(Argentina) Chacarita Juniors	Ascoli	Undisclosed
25 June 2010	Luca Cognigni	Italy	Ascoli	Mezzocorona	Co-ownership, €500
2010-06-25	Andrea Luci	Italy	Ascoli	Livorno	Undisclosed
2010-06-25	Julián Magallanes	Argentina	Vicenza	Cittadella	Undisclosed
2010-06-25	Matteo Ardemagni	Italy	Triestina	Cittadella	Co-ownership, Undisclosed
26 June 2010	Daniel Bradaschia	Italy	Udinese	Lumezzane	Co-ownership, €150,000
26 June 2010	Rodrigue Boisfer	France	Genoa	Gubbio	€15,000
2010-06-27	Stephan El Shaarawi	Italy	Genoa	Padova	Loan
28 June 2010^{1}	Marco Costantino	Italy	SPAL	Juventus	€170,000
2010-06-28	Gennaro Sardo	Italy	Catania	Chievo	Undisclosed
2010-06-28	Giovanni Marchese	Italy	Chievo	Catania	Undisclosed
2010-06-28	Mehmet Hetemaj	Finland	(Greece) Panionios	AlbinoLeffe	Undisclosed
2010-06-29	Fabio Barrichello	Italy	Bassano	Chievo	Loan
2010-06-29	Luca Caldirola	Italy	Internazionale	(Netherlands) Vitesse Arnhem	Loan
29 June 2010	Juri Toppan	Italy	Internazionale	Spezia	Co-ownership, €500
29 June 2010	Filippo Tanaglia	Italy	Chievo	Ascoli	Co-ownership, €500,000 (swap with Rosania)
29 June 2010	Daniele Rosania	Italy	Ascoli	Chievo	Co-ownership, €500,000 (swap with Tanaglia)
29 June 2010	Daniele Rosania	Italy	Chievo	Ascoli	Loan
29 June 2010	Ivan Reali	Italy	Vicenza	Ascoli	Co-ownership, €400,000 (swap with A.Mandorlini)
29 June 2010	Andrea Mandorlini	Italy	Ascoli	Vicenza	Co-ownership, €400,000 (swap with Reali)
30 June 2010	Antonio Giosa	Italy	Vicenza	Reggina	Free
30 June 2010	Mohammed Rabiu	Ghana	(Ghana) Liberty Professionals	Udinese	Undisclosed
30 June 2010	Denis Tonucci	Italy	Cesena	Vicenza	Co-ownership, €1.3M (swap with Tulli)
30 June 2010	Giacomo Tulli	Italy	Vicenza	Cesena	Co-ownership, €1.3M (swap with Tonucci)
30 June 2010	Giacomo Tulli	Italy	Cesena	Vicenza	Loan
30 June 2010	Mattia Evangelisti	Italy	Vicenza	Cesena	Co-ownership, €450,000 (swap with Righini)
30 June 2010	Luca Righini	Italy	Cesena	Vicenza	Co-ownership, €450,000 (swap with Evangelisti)
30 June 2010	Matteo Contini	Italy	Napoli	(Spain) Zaragoza	€2M
30 June 2010	Andrea Bavena	Italy	Internazionale	Portogruaro	Co-ownership, €500
30 June 2010	Andrea Mei	Italy	Internazionale	Piacenza	Co-ownership, €750,000 (player exchange)
30 June 2010	Luca Tremolada	Italy	Internazionale	Piacenza	Co-ownership, €750,000 (player exchange)
30 June 2010	Andrea Lussardi	Italy	Piacenza	Internazionale	Co-ownership, €900,000 (player exchange)
30 June 2010	Matteo Colombi	Italy	Piacenza	Internazionale	Co-ownership, €600,000 (player exchange)
2010-06-30	Ferdinando Coppola	Italy	Milan	Siena	Loan
30 June 2010	Emanuele Pesoli	Italy	Cittadella	Varese	Free
30 June 2010	Milan Đurić	Bosnia and Herzegovina	Cesena	Parma	Co-ownership, €1.1M (swap with Galuppo)
30 June 2010	Alberto Galuppo	Italy	Parma	Cesena	Co-ownership, €1.1M (swap with Đurić)
1 July 2010	Davide Bertoncini	Italy	Piacenza	Genoa	Co-ownership, €150,000
1 July 2010	Massimo Fornoni	Italy	Crotone	Siracusa	Co-ownership, Undisclosed
1 July 2010	Davide Tonani	Italy	Internazionale	Chievo (youth)	Co-ownership, €500
1 July 2010	Giorgio Schiavini	Italy	Internazionale	Sassuolo (youth)	Co-ownership, €1,000
1 July 2010	Dani Benítez	Spain	Udinese	(Spain) Granada	Loan
1 July 2010	Felipe Sanchón	Spain	Udinese	(Spain) Granada	Loan
1 July 2010	Dario Campagna	Italy	Juventus	Verona	Co-ownership, Undisclosed
1 July 2010	Fabio Ceravolo	Italy	Reggina	Atalanta	Co-ownership, €900,000
1 July 2010	Paulinho	Brazil	Livorno	Sorrento	Loan
1 July 2010	Pasquale Schiattarella	Italy	Ancona	Livorno	Free
2010-07-01	Eugenio Lamanna	Italy	Genoa	Gubbio	Loan
1 July 2010	Felipe	Brazil	Udinese	Fiorentina	€6M
1 July 2010	Stephen Makinwa	Nigeria	Lazio	(Greece) AEL	Loan
1 July 2010	Schumacher	Brazil	Udinese	Austria Wien	Undisclosed
1 July 2010	Denny Nazari	Italy	Ascoli	South Tyrol	Co-ownership
1 July 2010	Luca Stocchi	Italy	Internazionale	Piacenza	Co-ownership, €500
1 July 2010	Dennis Esposito	Italy	Internazionale	Monza	Co-ownership, €500
2010-07-01	Vincenzo Rennella	France	Genoa	(Switzerland) Grasshopper	Loan
1 July 2010	Nicolas Desenclos	France	Internazionale	(Belgium) Eupen	Free
1 July 2010	Radek Petr	Czech Republic	Parma	(Belgium) Eupen	Free
1 July 2010	Pape Moussa Diakhatè	Senegal	Fiorentina	(Belgium) Eupen	Free
1 July 2010	Andrea Doninelli	Italy	Cosenza	Genoa	Co-ownership, €150,000
1 July 2010	Leonardo Bonucci	Italy	Bari	Juventus	€15.5M (partly player swap)
1 July 2010	Jorge Martínez	Uruguay	Catania	Juventus	€12M
1 July 2010	Luca Toni	Italy	(Germany) Bayern Munich	Genoa	Free
1 July 2010	Danilo Alessandro	Italy	Voghera (amateur)	Grosseto	Free
1 July 2010	Simone Zaza	Italy	Atalanta	Sampdoria	Free
2010-07-01	Matthias Lepiller	France	Fiorentina	(Belgium) Eupen	Loan
2010-07-01	Jefferson	Brazil	Fiorentina	(Belgium) Eupen	Loan
1 July 2010	Abdelkader Ghezzal	Algeria	Siena	Bari	Co-ownership, €2.25M (cash plus player swap)
1 July 2010	Pedro Kamata	France	Bari	Siena	Co-ownership, €500,000 (part of Ghezzal)
1 July 2010	Filippo Carobbio	Italy	Bari	Siena	Co-ownership, €500,000 (part of Ghezzal)
1 July 2010	Nico Pulzetti	Italy	Livorno	Bari	Loan, Free
1 July 2010	Davide Faraoni	Italy	Lazio	Internazionale	Free
1 July 2010	Diego Oliveira	Brazil	Cittadella	Vicenza	Free
1 July 2010	Riccardo Brosco	Italy	Roma	Triestina	Co-ownership, €100,000
1 July 2010	Marcus Diniz	Brazil	Milan	Parma	Loan, €750,000
1 July 2010	Philippe Coutinho	Brazil	(Brazil) Vasco da Gama	Internazionale	€4.6M
1 July 2010	Ciro Immobile	Italy	Juventus (youth)	Siena	Loan
1 July 2010	Luca Marrone	Italy	Juventus (youth)	Siena	Loan
1 July 2010	Niccolò Giannetti	Italy	Siena	Juventus (youth)	Loan
1 July 2010	Marcel Büchel	Austria	Siena	Juventus (youth)	Loan
1 July 2010	Leonardo Spinazzola	Italy	Siena	Juventus (youth)	Loan
2 July 2010	Mark Bresciano	Australia	Palermo	Lazio	Free
2010-07-02	Mato Jajalo	Croatia	Siena	(Germany) Köln	Loan
2 July 2010	Evans Soligo	Italy	Salernitana	Vicenza	Free
2 July 2010	Gianluca Curci	Italy	Siena	Sampdoria	€2.25M (co-owned with Roma)
2010-07-02	Rubén Olivera	Uruguay	(Uruguay) Peñarol	Lecce	Free
2 July 2010	Nicholas Costantini	Italy	Genoa	Lucchese	Co-ownership, €500
4 July 2010	Alex Benvenga	Italy	Varese	Valenzana	Co-ownership, Undisclosed
2010-07-04	Valeri Bojinov	Bulgaria	(England) Manchester City	Parma	Undisclosed
2010-07-05	Leonardo Terigi	Italy	Genoa	Crotone	Loan
2010-07-05	Marco Motta	Italy	Udinese	Juventus	Loan, €1.25M
2010-07-05	Francesco Ruopolo	Italy	AlbinoLeffe	Atalanta	Free
2010-07-05	Matteo Sereni	Italy	Torino	Brescia	Free
2010-07-05	Matěj Vydra	Czech Republic	(Czech Republic) Baník Ostrava	Udinese	Undisclosed
2010-07-06	David Mounard	France	Gallipoli	Siena	Free
2010-07-06	Vid Belec	Slovenia	Internazionale	Crotone	Loan
2010-07-06	Bruno Martignoni	Switzerland	(Switzerland) Locarno	Cagliari	Loan
2010-07-06	Gabriel Paletta	Argentina	(Argentina) Boca Juniors	Parma	Undisclosed
2010-07-06	Pierre-Emerick Aubameyang	Gabon	Milan	(France) AS Monaco	Loan
2010-07-06	Umberto Eusepi	Italy	Genoa	Varese	Co-ownership, €500
2010-07-06	Wilfred Osuji	Nigeria	Milan	Varese	Co-ownership, €10,000
2010-07-06	Federico Furlan	Italy	Milan	Varese	Co-ownership, €10,000
2010-07-06	Antonio Narciso	Italy	Modena	Grosseto	Free
2010-07-06	Michele Mangiapelo	Italy	Isola Liri	Grosseto	Undisclosed
2010-07-06	Angelo Iorio	Italy	Piacenza	Grosseto	Undisclosed
6 July 2010	Matteo Bruscagin	Italy	Milan	Grosseto	Co-ownership, €1,000
6 July 2010	Davide Luppi	Italy	Sassuolo	Viareggio	Co-ownership, €500
2010-07-06	Matteo Calamai	Italy	Siena	Viareggio	Loan
2010-07-07	Daniele Pedrelli	Italy	Internazionale	Spezia	Loan
2010-07-07	Kamil Glik	Poland	(Poland) Piast Gliwice	Palermo	€1M
2010-07-07	Luca Santonocito	Italy	(Scotland) Celtic	Milan	Free
2010-07-07	Lorenzo Lollo	Italy	Fiorentina	Spezia	Co-ownership, €500
2010-07-07	Andrea Talignani	Italy	Parma	Valenzana	?
2010-07-07	Cristian Anelli	Italy	Parma	Valenzana	Co-ownership, €250
2010-07-08	Kadir Caidi	Italy	Cesena (youth)	Valenzana	Loan
2010-07-08	Nicola Cosentini	Italy	Juventus	Viareggio	Co-ownership, Undisclosed
2010-07-08	Giorgio Merlano	Italy	Juventus	Viareggio	Co-ownership, Undisclosed
2010-07-08	Alessandro D'Antoni	Italy	Juventus	Viareggio	Co-ownership, Undisclosed
2010-07-08	Carlo Pinsoglio	Italy	Juventus	Viareggio	?
2010-07-08	Massimo Gotti	Italy	Udinese	Empoli	Loan
2010-07-08	Alessio Grea	Italy	Genoa	Ravenna	Loan
2010-07-08	Nicolae Dică	Romania	Catania	(Turkey) Manisaspor	Loan
2010-07-08	Marco Cellini	Italy	AlbinoLeffe	Varese	Free
2010-07-08	Eduardo	Portugal	(Portugal) Braga	Genoa	€4.8M
2010-07-08	Simon Kjær	Denmark	Palermo	(Germany) Wolfsburg	€12.5M
2010-07-08	Jaime Valdés	Chile	Atalanta	(Portugal) Sporting	€3.15M
2010-07-08	Bogdan Lobonţ	Romania	(Romania) Dinamo București	Roma	€0.8M
2010-07-08	Yonese Hanine	Italy	Chievo	Crotone	Loan
2010-07-08	Alexandre Geijo	Spain	Udinese	(Spain) Granada	Loan
2010-07-08	Daniel Ciofani	Italy	Atletico Roma	Parma	Co-ownership, €0.3M
2010-07-08	Daniel Ciofani	Italy	Parma	Atletico Roma	Loan
2010-07-08	Francesco Bolzoni	Italy	Genoa	Siena	Loan, €0.4M
2020-07-09	Alessandro Lambrughi	Italy	Mantova	Livorno	Free
2010-07-09	Jasmin Handanovič	Slovenia	Mantova	Empoli	Free
2010-07-09	Alessio Tombesi	Italy	Parma	Atletico Roma	Co-ownership, €50,000
2010-07-09	Gianluca Lapadula	Italy	Parma	Atletico Roma	Loan
2010-07-09	Abdou Doumbia	France	Parma	Atletico Roma	Loan
2010-07-09	Abel Gigli	Italy	Parma	Atletico Roma	Co-ownership, €500
9 July 2010	Francesco Battaglia	Italy	Cittadella	SPAL	Undisclosed
2010-07-09	Mariano Romano	Italy	Siena	South Tyrol	Loan
2010-07-09	Thomas Albanese	Italy	Siena	South Tyrol	Loan
2010-07-09	Gaetano Capogrosso	Italy	Siena	Gubbio	Loan
2010-07-09	Giovanni Bartolucci	Italy	Siena	Gubbio	Loan
2010-07-09	Carlo Crociani	Italy	Siena	Montichiari	Loan
2010-07-09	Matteo Ardemagni	Italy	Cittadella	Atalanta	€3.75M
2010-07-09	Daniele Gasparetto	Italy	Atalanta	Cittadella	Co-ownership, €500
2010-07-09	Manolo Gabbiadini	Italy	Atalanta	Cittadella	Co-ownership, €500
2010-07-09	Riccardo Meggiorini	Italy	Genoa	Bologna	Co-ownership, €3M
2010-07-09	Giacomo Casoli	Italy	Fiorentina	Spezia	Co-ownership, €0.25M
2010-07-09	Francesco Parravicini	Italy	Siena	Livorno	Loan
2010-07-09	Jefferson Trazzi	Brazil	Lecce	Chievo	Free
2010-07-10	Ivan Reali	Italy	Ascoli	Mezzocorona	Loan
2010-07-10	Alessio Luciani	Italy	Lazio	Lumezzane	Loan
10 July 2010	Gaetano Caridi	Mantova	Grosseto	Free	
2010-07-11	Silvano Raggio Garibaldi	Italy	Genoa	Gubbio	?
11 July 2010	Paolo Branduani	AlbinoLeffe	FeralpiSalò	Loan	
2010-07-11	Adrian Bică Bădan	Romania	Catania	Milazzo	
2010-07-12	Andrea D'Amico	Italy	Catania	Milazzo	Loan
	Luis Muriel	Colombia	(Colombia) Deportivo Cali	Udinese	Undisclosed
2010-07-12	Luis Muriel	Colombia	Udinese	(Spain) Granada	Loan
2010-07-12	Guilherme Siqueira	Brazil	Udinese	(Spain) Granada	Loan
2010-07-12	Filipe Oliveira	Portugal	(Belgium) Eupen	Parma	€1.05M
2010-07-12	Zé Eduardo	Brazil	(Brazil) Maga	Parma	Loan
2010-07-12	Leandro Martínez	Italy	(Switzerland) Biaschesi	AlbinoLeffe	Undisclosed
2010-07-12	Anthony Taugourdeau	France	Carpi	AlbinoLeffe	Undisclosed
2010-07-12	Antimo Iunco	Italy	Cittadella	Chievo	€0.7M, Co-ownership resolution
2010-07-12	Antimo Iunco	Italy	Chievo	Torino	Co-ownership, €1M
2010-07-12	Matteo Darmian	Italy	Milan	Palermo	Co-ownership, €0.8M
2010-07-13	Mattia Maggioni	Italy	Milan	Monza	
2010-07-13	Alessandro Tuia	Italy	Lazio	Monza	Loan
2010-07-13	Manuel Ricci	Italy	Lazio	Monza	
2010-07-13	Fabio Meduri	Italy	Lazio	Monza	
2010-07-13	Fabio Catacchini	Italy	Rimini	Frosinone	Free
2010-07-13	Nicola Canzian	Italy	Atalanta	Modena	Loan
2010-07-13	Cristiano Lupatelli	Italy	Cagliari	Bologna	Free
2010-07-13	Vicente	Brazil	Portogruaro	Padova	Free
2010-07-13	Lorenzo Burzigotti	Italy	Foggia	Reggina	Undisclosed
2010-07-13	Francesco Acerbi	Italy	Pavia	Reggina	Co-ownership, Undisclosed
2010-07-13	Alessio Campagnacci	Italy	Giulianova	Reggina	Loan
2010-07-13	Tommaso Squillace	France	Reggina	Pavia	Loan
2010-07-13	Marco Giannattasio	Italy	Reggina	Pavia	Loan
2010-07-13	Carlos Calvo	Spain	(Spain) Xerez	Udinese	Undisclosed
2010-07-13	Carlos Calvo	Spain	Udinese	(Spain) Granada	?
2010-07-13	Davide Brivio	Italy	Vicenza	Lecce	Co-ownership, €0.75M
2010-07-13	Alain Baclet	Italy	Lecce	Vicenza	Co-ownership, €0.4M
2010-07-13	Davide Bottone	Italy	Torino	Frosinone	Undisclosed
2010-07-14	Biagio Pagano	Italy	Reggina	Livorno	Undisclosed
2010-07-14	Nicola Ravaglia	Italy	Cesena	SPAL	Loan
2010-07-14	Antonio Mazzotta	Italy	Lecce	Pescara	Loan
2010-07-14	Nicola Bellomo	Italy	Bari	Lucchese	Loan
2010-07-14	Jesús Dátolo	Argentina	Napoli	(Spain) Espanyol	Loan
2010-07-14	Fernando Marqués	Spain	(Spain) Terrassa	Parma	Loan, €0.2M
2010-07-14	Artur Boruc	Poland	(Scotland) Celtic	Fiorentina	€1.232M
2010-07-14	Antonio Esposito	Italy	Internazionale	Padova	Loan
2010-07-14	Rachid Arma	Morocco	SPAL	Cittadella	Co-ownership, Undisclosed
2010-07-14	Dario Biasi	Italy	Cesena	Cagliari	Free
2010-07-14	Matteo Momentè	Italy	Varese	AlbinoLeffe	Loan
2010-07-14	Isaac Cofie	Ghana	Genoa	Torino	Loan
2010-07-14	Dejan Lazarević	Slovenia	Genoa	Torino	Loan
2010-07-14	Yuto Nagatomo	Japan	(Japan) FC Tokyo	Cesena	Loan
2010-07-14	Andrea Mengoni	Italy	Chievo	Pescara	Co-ownership, €0.1M
2010-07-15	Angelo Siniscalchi	Italy	Ascoli	Benevento	Co-ownership, €30,000
2010-07-15	Mattia Evangelisti	Italy	Cesena	Andria	Loan
2010-07-15	Andrea Paolucci	Italy	Fiorentina	Andria	Co-ownership, €500
2010-07-15	Loris Palazzo	Italy	Bari	Andria	Co-ownership, €500
2010-07-15	Marco D'Alessandro	Italy	Roma	Bari	Loan, €0.3M
2010-07-15	Andrea Esposito	Italy	Genoa	Bologna	Loan
2010-07-15	Odion Ighalo	Nigeria	Udinese	Cesena	Loan
2010-07-15	Mirko Eramo	Italy	Sampdoria	Crotone	Loan
2010-07-15	Alessandro Crescenzi	Italy	Roma	Crotone	Loan
2010-07-15	José Espinal	Dominican Republic	Cesena	(Belgium) Eupen	Free
2010-07-15	Marco Di Crescenzo	Italy	Siena	Fano	Loan
2010-07-15	Luigi Castaldo	Italy	Siena	Giacomense	Loan
2010-07-15	Erwin Hoffer	Austria	Napoli	(Germany) Kaiserslautern	Loan
2010-07-15	Andrea Bertolacci	Italy	Roma	Lecce	Loan
2010-07-15	Simone Sini	Italy	Roma	Lecce	Loan
2010-07-15	Marco Di Fatta	Italy	Catania	Milazzo	Co-ownership, Undisclosed
2010-07-15	Davide Di Quinzio	Italy	AlbinoLeffe	Montichiari	Loan
2010-07-15	Davide Di Gennaro	Italy	Milan	Padova	Loan
2010-07-15	Elia Legati	Italy	Milan	Padova	Co-ownership, €0.66M
2010-07-15	Samuele Beretta	Italy	Internazionale	Pavia	Loan
2010-07-15	Mirko Guadalupi	Italy	Siena	Pavia	Loan
2010-07-15	Lorenzo Del Prete	Italy	Siena	Pescara	Loan
2010-07-15	Leonardo Nunzella	Italy	Brindisi	Lecce (youth)	Undisclosed
2010-07-15	Salvatore Giglio	Italy	Brindisi	Lecce (youth)	Undisclosed
2010-07-15	Arturo Ymeri	Italy	Genoa	Savona	Loan
2010-07-15	Giorgio Parodi	Italy	Genoa	Savona	Loan
2010-07-15	Alessandro Romeo	Italy	Livorno	Savona	Co-ownership, Undisclosed
2010-07-15	Stefano Pettinari	Italy	Roma	Siena	Loan
2010-07-15	Agostino Garofalo	Italy	Siena	Torino	Loan
2010-07-15	Café	Brazil	(Brazil) América (RJ)	Varese	Undisclosed
2010-07-15	Giuseppe Figliomeni	Italy	Arezzo	Varese	Free
2010-07-15	Edenilson Bergonsi	Brazil	(Brazil) Juventude	Varese	Free
2010-07-15	Samuele Modica	Italy	Livorno	Viareggio	Loan
2010-07-16	Amedeo Benedetti	Italy	Vicenza (& Chievo)	Pro Patria	Loan
2010-07-16	Diego Albadoro	Italy	Bari	Juve Stabia	Loan
2010-07-16	Marco Valtulina	Italy	Torino	Juve Stabia	Co-ownership, Undisclosed
2010-07-16	Francesco Migliore	Italy	Giulianova	Crotone	Co-ownership, Undisclosed
2010-07-16	Fabio Gubinelli	Italy	Giulianova	Crotone	Co-ownership, Undisclosed
2010-07-16	Kevin Vinetot	France	Giulianova	Crotone	Undisclosed
	Fabio Gubinelli	Italy	Crotone	Giulianova	Loan
2010-07-16	Stefano Del Sante	Italy	Varese	Pavia	Loan
2010-07-16	Francesco Mancini	Italy	Lazio	Lumezzane	Loan
2010-07-16	Federico Sevieri	Italy	Lazio	Lumezzane	Co-ownership, Undisclosed
2010-07-16	Francesco Zizzari	Italy	Pescara	Reggina	Co-ownership, Undisclosed
2010-07-16	Emmanuel Cascione	Italy	Reggina	Pescara	Co-ownership, Undisclosed
2010-07-16	Antonio Lamenza	Italy	Reggina	Poggibonsi	Co-ownership, Undisclosed
2010-07-16	Kris Thackray	England	Reggina	Andria	?
2010-07-16	Lorenzo Degeri	Italy	Internazionale	Cremonese	Co-ownership, €500
2010-07-16	Giovanni Di Lorenzo	Italy	Lucchese	Reggina (youth)	Loan
2010-07-16	Domenico Marchetti	Italy	Fiorentina	Pro Patria	Loan
2010-07-16	Lorenzo Tafi	Italy	Fiorentina	Prato	Co-ownership, €500
2010-07-16	Giacomo Lepri	Italy	Fiorentina	Paganese	Co-ownership, €500
2010-07-16	Andrea Paolucci	Italy	Fiorentina	Andria	Co-ownership, €500
2010-07-16	Benedetto Lorusso	Italy	Bari	Barletta	Loan
2010-07-16	Zsolt Tamási	Hungary	Parma	Lanciano	Loan
2010-07-16	Michel Morganella	Switzerland	Palermo	Novara	Loan
2010-07-16	Eliseu	Portugal	Lazio	(Spain) Málaga	Undisclosed
2010-07-16	Paolo Facchinetti	Italy	Genoa	Savona	Free
2010-07-16	Paolo Tornaghi	Italy	Internazinoale	Como	Loan
2010-07-16	Simone Fautario	Italy	Internazinoale	Como	Co-ownership, €500
2010-07-16	Aniello Ambrosio	Italy	Sorrento	Lecce (youth)	Loan
2010-07-16	Cristian Daminuţă	Romania	Internazionale	Milan	€2.5M
2010-07-16	Attila Filkor	Hungary	Internazionale	Milan	€1M
2010-07-16	Marco Fossati	Italy	Internazionale	Milan	€3.5M
2010-07-16	Mattia Bodano	Italy	Cagliari	Gavorrano	Loan
2010-07-16	Andrea Raggi	Italy	Palermo	Bari	Loan
2010-07-16	Michele Rinaldi	Italy	Rimini	Bari	Free
2010-07-16	Francesco Signori	Italy	Sampdoria	Modena	Loan
2010-07-16	Enrico Alfonso	Italy	Internazionale	Modena	Loan
2010-07-16	Mirco Velardi	Italy	Palermo	Modena	Loan
2010-07-16	Giacomo Brichetto	Italy	Novara	Palermo	€0.13M
2010-07-16	Santiago García	Argentina	(Argentina) Rosario Central	Palermo	€1.301M
2010-07-16	Mario Merlonghi	Italy	Monterotondo	Parma	Free
2010-07-16	Antonio Donnarumma	Italy	Milan	Piacenza	Loan
2010-07-16	Sergio Volpi	Italy	Reggina	Piacenza	Free
2010-07-16	Valerio Di Cesare	Italy	Vicenza	Torino	€0.25M
2010-07-16	Alemão	Brazil	Udinese	Vicenza	Co-ownership, €0.4M
2010-07-16	Denis D'Onofrio	Italy	Torino	Viareggio	Co-ownership, Undisclosed
2010-07-17	Fabio Conocchioli	Italy	Ascoli	Mezzocorona	Loan
2010-07-17	Filippo Bigeschi	Italy	Siena	Poggibonsi	Loan
2010-07-17	Giacomo Malquori	Italy	Siena (youth)	Matera	Loan
2010-07-17	Reyza Soudant	Morocco	Pomezia	Siena (youth)	Undisclosed
2010-07-17	Giorgio Schiavini	Italy	Sassuolo (co-owned with Inter)	Fano	Loan
17 July 2010	Nicola Ferrari	Italy	Sassuolo	Fano	Co-ownership, €500
2010-07-17	Filippo Perucchini	Italy	Milan	Fano	Loan
2010-07-17	Alessandro Beni	Italy	Ascoli	Fano	Loan
2010-07-17	Jacopo Fiorucci	Italy	Chievo	Foligno	Loan
2010-07-17	Salvatore Papa	Italy	Chievo	Foligno	Co-ownership, €100
2010-07-17	Luigi Scotto	Italy	Genoa	Pergocrema	
2010-07-17	Fabio Romeo	Italy	Lecce	Pergocrema	Loan
2010-07-17	Antonino Profeta	Italy	Catania	Pergocrema	
2010-07-17	Luca Ricci	Italy	Cesena	Pergocrema	Loan
2010-07-17	Aiman Napoli	Italy	Internazionale	Crotone	Loan
2010-07-17	Edinson Cavani	Uruguay	Palermo	Napoli	Loan, €5M
2010-07-17	Giuseppe Greco	Italy	Genoa	Grosseto	Loan
2010-07-18	Michele Troiano	Italy	Modena	Sassuolo	Undisclosed
2010-07-18	Ivan Merli Sala	Italy	Cassino	Chievo	Free
2010-07-18	Ivan Merli Sala	Italy	Chievo	Foligno	Co-ownership, €100
2010-07-19	Lucas Finazzi	Italy	Chievo	Lumezzane	Loan
2010-07-19	Robert Guri Baqaj	Sweden	AlbinoLeffe	(Sweden) Halmstad	Loan
2010-07-19	Antonio Marino	Italy	Udinese	Ascoli	Loan
2010-07-19	Ettore Mendicino	Italy	Lazio	Ascoli	Loan
2010-07-19	Antonino Bonvissuto	Italy	Bari	Ascoli	Loan
2010-07-19	Achille Coser	Italy	Pro Belvedere Vercelli	Ascoli	Free
2010-07-19	Giammarco Corsino	Italy	Palermo	Pro Vercelli	
2010-07-19	Luca Meregalli	Italy	Milan (youth)	Pro Vercelli	Loan
2010-07-19	Marco Martina Rini	Italy	Brescia	Verona	Loan
2010-07-19	José Ángel Crespo	Italy	(Spain) Sevilla	Padova	Undisclosed
2010-07-19	Fabrizio Paghera	Italy	Brescia	Verona	Loan
2010-07-19	Andrea Caroppo	Italy	Brescia	Verona	Co-ownership, €250
2010-07-19	Magnus Troest	Denmark	Genoa	Atalanta	Loan
2010-07-19	Michael Cardinali	Italy	Fiorentina	Chieti	Loan
2010-07-20	Alex Pederzoli	Italy	Gallipoli	Ascoli	Free
2010-07-20	Simone Esposito	Italy	Juventus	Ascoli	Co-ownership, €0.1M
2010-07-20	Carlo Ilari	Italy	Ascoli	Juventus	Co-ownership, €0.5M
2010-07-20	Mohamadou Sissoko	France	Udinese	(Scotland) Kilmarnock	Loan
2010-07-20	Antonio Caracciolo	Italy	Pavia	Genoa	Undisclosed
2010-07-20	Erjon Bogdani	Italy	Chievo	Cesena	Free
2010-07-20	Sokratis Papastathopoulos	Greece	Genoa	Milan	€14M
2010-07-20	Gianmarco Zigoni	Italy	Milan	Genoa	Co-ownership, €3.75M
2010-07-20	Nnamdi Oduamadi	Nigeria	Milan	Genoa	Co-ownership, €3.5M
2010-07-20	Rodney Strasser	Sierra Leone	Milan	Genoa	Co-ownership, €2.25M
2010-07-20	Nnamdi Oduamadi	Nigeria	Genoa	Milan	Loan
2010-07-20	Rodney Strasser	Sierra Leone	Genoa	Milan	Loan
2010-07-20	Andrea Ranocchia	Italy	Genoa	Internazionale	Co-ownership, €6.5M
2010-07-20	Andrea Ranocchia	Italy	Internazionale	Genoa	Loan
2010-07-20	Mattia Destro	Italy	Internazionale	Genoa	Loan
2010-07-20	Tommaso Chiecchi	Italy	Chievo	Lecco	Free
2010-07-20	Louis Parfait	Cameroon	Genoa	Crotone	Loan
2010-07-20	Emmanuel Ledesma	Argentina	Genoa	Crotone	Co-ownership, €500
2010-07-20	Matteo Chinellato	Italy	Genoa	Reggiana	Loan
2010-07-20	Matteo D'Alessandro	Italy	Genoa	Reggiana	Loan
2010-07-20	Mattia Ferraro	Italy	Genoa	Fano	Loan
2010-07-20	Nicolò Antonelli	Italy	Genoa	Savona	Co-ownership, €500
2010-07-20	Jacopo Sbravati	Italy	Genoa	Giacomense	Loan
2010-07-20	Matteo Amico	Italy	Genoa	Giacomense	Loan
2010-07-21	Manuel Nocciolini	Italy	Fiorentina	Gavorrano	Free
2010-07-21	Gianmarco Conti	Italy	Milan (youth)	Fano	Loan
2010-07-21	Luca Castiglia	Italy	Juventus	Viareggio	Loan
2010-07-21	Simone Romagnoli	Italy	Milan	Foggia	Loan
2010-07-21	Archimede Morleo	Italy	Crotone	Bologna	Co-ownership, €0.4M
2010-07-21	Edgar Çani	Albania	Palermo	Modena	Loan
2010-07-21	Niko Bianconi	Italy	Vicenza (youth)	Juventus (youth)	Co-ownership, €0.5M (player exchange)
2010-07-21	Fausto Rossi	Italy	Juventus	Vicenza	Co-ownership, €0.5M (player exchange)
2010-07-21	Pietro Baccolo	Italy	Parma	South Tyrol	Loan
2010-07-21	Giuseppe Rizza	Italy	Livorno	Pergocrema	Loan
2010-07-21	Andrea Migliorini	Italy	Livorno	SPAL	Co-ownership, Undisclosed
2010-07-22	Samuele Romeo	Italy	Palermo	Alessandria	Loan
2010-07-22	Gabriele Aldegani	Italy	Grosseto	Benevento	Free
2010-07-22	Raffaele Bianco	Italy	Juventus	Benevento	Loan
2010-07-22	Artur	Brazil	Roma	(Portugal) Braga	Free
2010-07-22	Mariano Bogliacino	Uruguay	Napoli	Chievo	Loan
2010-07-22	Roland Varga	Hungary	Brescia	Foggia	Loan
2010-07-22	Bartosz Salamon	Poland	Brescia	Foggia	Loan
2010-07-22	Chico	Spain	(Spain) Almería	Genoa	€5.53M
2010-07-22	Franco Zuculini	Argentina	(Germany) TSG Hoffenheim	Genoa	Loan
2010-07-22	Simone Benedetti	Italy	Torino (youth)	Internazionale (youth)	Co-ownership, €2M (player exchange)
2010-07-22	Alen Stevanović	Serbia	Internazionale	Torino	Co-ownership, €2M (player exchange)
2010-07-22	Massimiliano Benassi	Italy	Perugia	Lecce	Free
2010-07-22	Francesco Benussi	Italy	Lecce	Palermo	Undisclosed
2010-07-22	Eros Pellegrini	Italy	Palermo	Pavia	Loan
2010-07-22	Gianluca Nicco	Italy	Mantova	Pescara	Free
2010-07-22	Thanasis Karagounis	Greece	(Greece) Atromitos Athens	Udinese	Undisclosed
2010-07-22	Steve Leo Beleck	Cameroon	(Greece) Panthrakikos	Udinese	Undisclosed
2010-07-23	Andrea Schenetti	Italy	Milan	Lucchese	Loan
2010-07-23	Fabio Lucioni	Italy	Gela	Siena	€25,000
2010-07-23	Fabio Lucioni	Italy	Siena	Barletta	Co-ownership, €500
2010-07-23	Alessandro Iacobucci	Italy	Mantova	Siena	Free
2010-07-23	Alessio Ambrogetti	Italy	Cesena	Como	Co-ownership, €500
2010-07-23	Lys Gomis	Senegal	Torino	Foggia	Loan
2010-07-23	Davide Bassi	Italy	Empoli	Torino	Loan
2010-07-23	Valerio Anastasi	Italy	Chievo	Lecco	Loan
2010-07-23	Nicola Carofiglio	Italy	Sampdoria (youth)	Lecco	Undisclosed
2010-07-23	Radoslav Kirilov	Bulgaria	Rimini	Chievo	Free
2010-07-23	Michele Sansotta	Italy	Perugia	Chievo	Free
2010-07-23	Salvatore Burrai	Italy	Cagliari	Foggia	Co-ownership, Undisclosed
2010-07-23	Marco Sau	Italy	Cagliari	Foggia	Co-ownership, Undisclosed
2010-07-23	Karim Laribi	Italy	Palermo	Foggia	Loan
2010-07-23	Vasco Regini	Italy	Sampdoria (co-owned with Cesena)	Foggia	Loan
2010-07-24	Nebil Caidi	Italy	Cesena	Pavia	Loan
2010-07-24	Marco Tattini	Italy	Cesena	Pavia	Loan
2010-07-24	Abel Aguilar	Colombia	Udinese	(Spain) Hércules	Undisclosed
2010-07-24	Aleksandar Kolarov	Serbia	Lazio	(England) Manchester City	Undisclosed
2010-07-24	Fabrizio Lasagna	Italy	Catania	Milazzo	Co-ownership, Undisclosed
2010-07-24	Salvatore Burrai	Italy	Cagliari	Foggia	Loan
2010-07-24	Marco Sau	Italy	Cagliari	Foggia	Loan
2010-07-24	Riccardo Allegretti	Italy	Bari	Grosseto	Free
2010-07-24	Antonio Carrozza	Italy	Rossanese (amateur)	Catania	Free
2010-07-24	Rocco Benci	Italy	HinterReggio (amateur)	Catania	Free
2010-07-24	Nicolás Navarro	Argentina	Napoli	(Argentina) Argentinos Juniors	Free
2010-07-24	Alessandro Marchi	Italy	Rimini	Piacenza	Free
2010-07-24	Pietro De Giorgio	Italy	Empoli	Crotone	Free
2010-07-24	Nicola Piras	Italy	Chievo	Rodengo Saiano	Co-ownership, €100
2010-07-25	Claudio Cafiero	Italy	Roma	Latina	
2010-07-25	Matteo Lanzoni	Italy	Sampdoria	Portogruaro	Loan
2010-07-25	Girolamo Provenzano	Italy	Udinese	Matera	
2010-07-25	Francesco Stella	Italy	Bari	Torino	Free
2010-07-25	Francesco Stella	Italy	Torino	Matera	
2010-07-25	Dario Fedi	Italy	Fiorentina (youth)	Matera	Co-ownership, €500
2010-07-25	Riccardo Capogna	Italy	Carpenedolo	Parma	Free
2010-07-25	Riccardo Capogna	Italy	Parma	Fondi	Loan
2010-07-26	Giuseppe Statella	Italy	Bari	Grosseto	Loan
2010-07-26	Simone Grippo	Switzerland	Chievo	Frosinone	Loan
2010-07-26	Francesco Lodi	Italy	Empoli	Frosinone	Undisclosed
2010-07-26	Mattia Mustacchio	Italy	Sampdoria	Varese	Loan
2010-07-26	Daniel Offredi	Italy	AlbinoLeffe	Reggiana	Loan
2010-07-26	Luca Tomasig	Italy	Reggiana	AlbinoLeffe	Loan
2010-07-26	Diego Falcinelli	Italy	Sassuolo	Foligno	Co-ownership, Undisclosed
2010-07-26	Filippo Forò	Italy	Vicenza	Mezzocorona	Loan
2010-07-27	Massimiliano Tagliani	Italy	Fiorentina	Ravenna	Co-ownership, €500
2010-07-27	Marco Augusto Romizi	Italy	Fiorentina	Reggiana	Loan
2010-07-27	Nicola Lanzolla	Italy	Monopoli	Catania	Free
2010-07-27	Nicola Lanzolla	Italy	Catania	Milazzo	Loan
2010-07-27	Antonio Carrozza	Italy	Catania	Milazzo	Co-ownership, Undisclosed
2010-07-27	Rocco Benci	Italy	Catania	Milazzo	Co-ownership, Undisclosed
2010-07-27	Rene Krhin	Italy	Internazionale	Bologna	Co-ownership, €2M
2010-07-27	Nicolò Cherubin	Italy	Cittadella	Bologna	€1.5M
2010-07-27	Gustavo	Brazil	(Brazil) Desportivo Brasil	Lecce	Loan
2010-07-27	Marco Rossi	Italy	Parma	Bari	Loan
2010-07-27	Simone Malatesta	Italy	Parma	Carpi	Loan
2010-07-27	Mariano Donda	Argentina	Bari	(Argentina) Godoy Cruz	Free
2010-07-27	Julio César de León	Honduras	Parma	(China) Shandong Luneng	€775
2010-07-28	André Cuneaz	Italy	Juventus	Alessandria	Co-ownership, Undisclosed
2010-07-28	Lorenzo Laverone	Italy	Arezzo	Reggina	Free
2010-07-28	Dimas	Brazil	Chievo	Montichiari	Co-ownership, €30,000
2010-07-28	Luca Moscatiello	Italy	(England) Fulham	Cesena	Free
2010-07-28	Luca Siligardi	Italy	Internazionale	Bologna	Loan
2010-07-28	Daniele Padelli	Italy	Sampdoria	Bari	Loan
2010-07-28	Juan Surraco	Uruguay	Udinese	Livorno	Loan
2010-07-28	Giovanni Formiconi	Italy	Udinese	Benevento	Loan
2010-07-28	Sebastian Forti	Italy	Genoa	Savona	
2010-07-28	Emanuele Testardi	Italy	Sampdoria	Gubbio	Loan
2010-07-28	Moussa Koné	Côte d'Ivoire	Atalanta	Foggia	Loan
2010-07-28	Marco Villanova	Italy	Atalanta	San Marino	Co-ownership, €500
2010-07-29	Andrea Catellani	Italy	Catania	Sassuolo	Loan
2010-07-29	Júnior Costa	Brazil	Ancona	Sampdoria	Free
2010-07-29	Iago Falqué	Spain	Juventus	Villarreal B	Loan
2010-07-29	Federico Gerardi	Italy	Udinese	Portogruaro	Loan
2010-07-29	Sakari Mattila	Finland	Udinese	(Switzerland) Bellinzona	Loan
29 July 2010	Aleksandar Luković	Serbia	Udinese	(Russia) Zenit Saint Petersburg	Undisclosed
29 July 2010	Alejandro Darío Gómez	Argentina	Arsenal de Sarandí (Argentina)	Catania	€2,238,400
2010-07-29	Filipe Oliveira	Portugal	Parma	Torino	Loan, €600,000
2010-07-29	Álvaro González	Uruguay	(Uruguay) Defensor Sporting	Lazio	Undisclosed
2010-07-29	Tore Reginiussen	Norway	(Germany) Schalke 04	Lecce	Loan
2010-07-29	Denis Maccan	Italy	Brescia	Pergocrema	Loan
2010-07-29	Jan Hable	Czech Republic	Ascoli	(Greece) [[[A.O. Kerkyra|Kerkyra]]	Loan
2010-07-30	Fabián Orellana	Chile	Udinese	(Spain) Granada	Loan
2010-07-30	Carlos Grossmüller	Uruguay	(Germany) Schalke 04	Lecce	Free
2010-07-30	Alberto Gerbo	Italy	Internazionale	Triestina	Loan
2010-07-30	Paolo Carbonaro	Italy	Palermo	Barletta	Loan
2010-07-30	Christian Obodo	Nigeria	Udinese	Torino	Loan
2010-07-30	Andrea Bertin	Italy	Chievo (youth)	Pro Patria	Co-ownership, €500
2010-07-31	Vakaba Traoré	Côte d'Ivoire	Colligiana	Ascoli (youth)	Free
2010-07-31	Matteo Legittimo	Italy	Lecce	Salernitana	Co-ownership, Undisclosed
2010-07-31	Christian Stuani	Uruguay	Reggina	(Spain) Levante	Loan
2010-07-31	Ergün Berisha	Turkey	Udinese	(Turkey) Istanbul BB	Loan

=== Notes ===
1. Player officially joined his new club on 1 July 2010.

== See also ==
- List of Italian football transfers summer 2010 (co-ownership)
