= List of Italian football transfers summer 2011 (co-ownership) =

This is a list of Italian football transfers for co-ownership resolutions, for the 2011–12 season, from and to Serie A and Serie B.

According to Article 102 bis of NOIF (Norme Organizzative Interne della F.I.G.C), the co-ownership deal had to be confirmed each year. The deal could expire, be renewed, bought back or sold outright. Deals that failed to form an agreement after the deadline would be defined by auction between the two clubs; the club would submit their bid in a sealed envelope. Non-submission (N.D. in the list) could lead to the rights becoming free to give to the opposite side. The mother club could also sell their rights to third parties, such as Emiliano Viviano in 2010.

The deadline of the 2011 window was at 19:00 on 24 June 2011 (Friday).

== Co-ownership ==
Date	Name	Co-Owner (active)	Passive club (Mother club)	Result	Fee
24 June 2011	Francesco Acerbi	Genoa	Reggina	Genoa	€2.2M
24 June 2011	Alemão (Brazil)	Vicenza	Udinese	ND (Vicenza)	Free
24 June 2011	Luis Maria Alfageme	Grosseto	Brescia	ND (Grosseto)	Free
22 June 2011	Enrico Alfonso	Internazionale	Chievo	Renewed	—
24 June 2011	Sergio Almirón	Bari	Juventus	Juventus	peppercorn
24 June 2011	Alessio Ambrogetti	Como	Cesena	ND (Como)	Free
25 June 2011	Cristiano Ancora	Matera	Varese	Varese	Auction, Undisclosed
22 June 2011	Marco Andreolli	Internazionale	Chievo	Chievo	€500,000 (swap with Rigione)
24 June 2011	Cristian Anelli	Valenzana	Parma	ND (Valenzana)	
24 June 2011	Giuseppe Angarano	Piacenza	Internazionale	ND (Piacenza)	Free
24 June 2011	Gabriele Angella	Udinese	Empoli	Renewed	—
24 June 2011	Mirco Antenucci	Torino	Catania	Renewed	—
24 June 2011	Nicolò Antonelli	Savona	Genoa	ND (Savona)	Free
24 June 2011	Matteo Arati	Fiorentina	Reggiana	Reggiana	€180,500
23 June 2011	Rachid Arma (Morocco)	Vicenza	SPAL	Renewed	—
24 June 2011	Andrea Arrigoni	Ternana	Atalanta	ND (Ternana)	Free
22 June 2011	Davide Astori	Cagliari	Milan	Cagliari	€3.5M
24 June 2011	Ramzi Aya	Reggiana	Fiorentina	Fiorentina	€215,000
24 June 2011	Loris Bacchetti	Sampdoria	Pescara	Renewed	—
24 June 2011	Pietro Baccolo	Parma	Padova	ND (Parma)	Free
23 June 2011	Alain Baclet	Vicenza	Lecce	Renewed	—
24 June 2011	Paulo Barreto (Brazil)	Bari	Udinese	Udinese	Undisclosed
23 June 2011	Alessandro Bastrini	Vicenza	Sampdoria	Renewed	—
24 June 2011	Andrea Bavena	Portogruaro	Internazionale	ND (Portogruaro)	Free
23 June 2011	Nazzareno Belfasti	Juventus	Modena	Renewed	—
23 June 2011	Nicola Belmonte	Siena	Bari	Siena	€1.25M (part of Ghezzal)
24 June 2011	Rocco Benci	Milazzo	Catania	ND (Milazzo)	
23 June 2011	Amedeo Benedetti	Vicenza	Chievo	Chievo	€1M (swap with Minesso)
21 June 2011	Simone Benedetti	Internazionale	Torino	Renewed	—
24 June 2011	Alex Benvenga	Valenzana	Varese	Varese	Undisclosed
24 May 2011	Giacomo Beretta	Genoa	Milan	Renewed	—
24 June 2011	Dario Bergamelli	AlbinoLeffe	Atalanta	AlbinoLeffe	€500
23 June 2011	Alessandro Bernardini	Livorno	Varese	Renewed	—
25 June 2011	Andrea Bertin	Pro Patria	Chievo	Chievo	Auction, €1,000
21 June 2011	Antonello Bertino	Gavorrano	Grosseto	Grosseto	Undisclosed
24 June 2011	Mauro Bertoli	Tritium	Atalanta	ND (Tritium)	Free
29 June 2011	Davide Bertolucci	Verona	Sangiovannese	Verona	Auction, Undisclosed
24 June 2011	Davide Bertoncini	Genoa	Piacenza	Renewed	—
24 June 2011	Samuele Bettoni	Reggiana	Fiorentina	Fiorentina	€500
23 June 2011	Niko Bianconi	Juventus	Vicenza	Renewed	—
24 June 2011	Giacomo Bindi	Crotone	Genoa	Renewed	—
24 May 2011	Kevin-Prince Boateng	Milan	Genoa	Milan	€7M
15 June 2011	Mattia Bodano	Gavorrano	Cagliari	Cagliari	Undisclosed
24 June 2011	Milan Bortel	SPAL	Catania	SPAL	Undisclosed
24 June 2011	Daniel Bradaschia	Lumezzane	Udinese	Renewed	—
23 June 2011	Davide Brivio	Lecce	Vicenza	Lecce	€750,000 (swap with Schiavi)
24 June 2011	Riccardo Brosco	Triestina	Roma	Triestina	€500
23 June 2011	Matteo Bruscagin	Grosseto	Milan	Grosseto	Free
24 June 2011	Rosario Bucolo	Milazzo	Catania	ND (Milazzo)	
24 June 2011	Alessandro Budel	Brescia	Parma	Brescia	Free
	Nicolò Buono	Carrarese	Sampdoria	ND	
31 August 2011	Salvatore Burrai	Foggia	Cagliari	Cagliari	Undisclosed
25 June 2011	Daniele Cacia	Lecce	Piacenza	Lecce	Auction, Undisclosed
25 June 2011	Dario Campagna	Verona	Juventus	Verona	Auction, Undisclosed
24 June 2011	Manuel Canini	Cesena	Internazionale	Renewed	—
20 June 2011	Giorgio Capece	Catania	Ascoli	Ascoli	€700,000 (part of Moretti)
24 June 2011	Denny Cardin	Portogruaro	Atalanta	Portogruaro	Free
	Carlos Carmona (Chile)	Atalanta	Reggina	Atalanta	Undisclosed
23 June 2011	Filippo Carobbio	Siena	Bari	Siena	€500,000 (part of Ghezzal)
24 June 2011	Andrea Caroppo	Verona	Brescia	Brescia	€250
24 June 2011	Emmanuel Cascione	Pescara	Reggina	Pescara	Undisclosed
25 June 2011	Giuseppe Casisa	Paganese	Varese	Paganese	
24 June 2011	Giacomo Casoli	Spezia	Fiorentina	Renewed	—
24 June 2011	Paolo Castellazzi	Foligno	Sampdoria	ND (Foligno)	
24 June 2011	Fabio Ceravolo	Atalanta	Reggina	Reggina	Undisclosed
24 June 2011	Ricardo Chará (Colombia)	Empoli	Udinese	Renewed	—
23 June 2011	Francesco Checcucci	Lumezzane	Chievo	Chievo	Undisclosed
24 June 2011	Michael Cia	AlbinoLeffe	Atalanta	AlbinoLeffe	€500
24 June 2011	Antonio Cinelli	Sassuolo	Lazio	Renewed	—
24 June 2011	Daniel Ciofani	Parma	Atletico Roma	Parma	€100,000
24 June 2011	Karamoko Cissé (Guinea)	AlbinoLeffe	Atalanta	AlbinoLeffe	€500
24 June 2011	Leonardo Cisterni	Spezia	Bologna	Renewed	—
c. 30 June 2011	Enrico Citro	Cavese	Roma	Roma	Undisclosed
4 July 2011	Andrea Cocco	AlbinoLeffe	Cagliari	Renewed	—
25 June 2011	Massimo Coda	Cremonese	Bologna	Bologna	Auction, €25,000
24 June 2011	Luca Cognigni	Mezzocorona	Ascoli	ND (Mezzocorona)	Free
24 June 2011	Matteo Colombi	Internazionale	Piacenza	Piacenza	€600,000 (player exchange)
24 June 2011	Raffaele Conforto	Sassuolo	Internazionale	ND (Sassuolo)	Free
24 June 2011	Nicolás Córdova (Chile)	Brescia	Parma	Brescia	Free
24 June 2011	Nicola Cosentini	Viareggio	Juventus	ND (Viareggio)	Free
24 June 2011	Alberto Cossentino	Novara	Palermo	Novara	Undisclosed
24 June 2011	Nicholas Costantini	Lucchese	Genoa	Genoa	€500
	Enrico Cotza	Villacidrese	Cagliari	Cagliari	Undisclosed
24 June 2011	André Cuneaz	Alessandria	Juventus	ND (Alessandria)	
24 June 2011	Gianluca Curci	Sampdoria	Roma	Roma	€500
21 June 2011	Francesco Curcio	Gavorrano	Grosseto	Grosseto	Undisclosed
25 June 2011	Gaetano D'Agostino	Fiorentina	Udinese	Udinese	Auction, €111,000
22 June 2011	Matteo D'Alessandro	Reggiana	Genoa	Renewed	—
24 June 2011	Simone D'Anna	Gela	Fiorentina	Renewed	—
	Alessandro D'Antoni	Viareggio	Juventus	ND	
	Loris Damonte	Alessandria	Genoa	Renewed	—
23 June 2011	Matteo Darmian	Palermo	Milan	Renewed	—
24 June 2011	Caio De Cenco	Bellaria	Cesena	Renewed	—
24 June 2011	Francesco De Rose	Reggina	Cosenza	Reggina	Undisclosed
24 June 2011	Luca Del Papa	Juventus	Pescara	Renewed	—
24 June 2011	Stefano Del Sante	Varese	Fiorentina	ND (Varese)	Free
24 June 2011	Claudio Della Penna	Ternana	Roma	ND (Ternana)	
16 June 2011	Lorenzo Degeri	Cremonese	Internazionale	Renewed	—
24 June 2011	Germán Denis (Argentina)	Udinese	Napoli	Udinese	€1M
24 June 2011	Francesco Dettori	Chievo	Pescara	ND (Chievo)	Free
24 June 2011	Samuel Di Carmine	Frosinone	Fiorentina	Renewed	—
24 June 2011	Marco Di Fatta	Milazzo	Catania	ND (Milazzo)	
16 June 2011	Luca Di Matteo	Vicenza	Palermo	Palermo	€200,000 (swap with Rigoni)
23 June 2011	Matteo Di Piazza	Pro Vercelli	Chievo	Renewed	—
24 June 2011	Mahamet Diagouraga (Mali)	Modena	Chievo	Modena	Free
24 June 2011	Dimas (Brazil)	Montichiari	Chievo	ND (Montichiari)	Free
24 June 2011	Milan Đurić	Parma	Cesena	Renewed	—
	Andrea Doninelli	Genoa	Cosenza	Genoa	€75,000
	Marco Duravia	Canavese	Juventus	ND (Canavese)	
24 June 2011	Blerim Džemaili	Parma	Torino	Parma	€3.5M
25 June 2011	Albin Ekdal	Bologna	Juventus	Juventus	Auction, €1.31M
24 June 2011	Alessandro Elia	Bologna	Parma	Parma	€1.5M (part of Pasi)
24 June 2011	Andrea Esposito	Genoa	Lecce	Renewed	—
23 June 2011	Dennis Esposito	Monza	Internazionale	Internazionale	peppercorn
22 June 2011	Simone Esposito	Reggiana	Juventus	Renewed	—
24 June 2011	Umberto Eusepi	Varese	Genoa	Renewed	—
23 June 2011	Mattia Evangelisti	Cesena	Vicenza	Renewed	—
31 August 2011	Diego Fabbrini	Udinese	Empoli	Udinese	Undisclosed
24 June 2011	Diego Falcinelli	Foligno	Sassuolo	Sassuolo	€25,000
21 June 2011	Vito Falconieri	Ascoli	Catania	ND (Ascoli)	Free
24 June 2011	Giacomo Fantin	Sangiovannese	Padova	ND (Sangiovannese)	
24 June 2011	Simone Fantoni	Brescia	Entella	Renewed	—
24 June 2011	Ivan Fatić (Montenegro)	Genoa	Chievo	Chievo	€200,000
24 June 2011	Simone Fautario	Como	Internazionale	Renewed	—
25 June 2011	Dario Fedi	Matera	Fiorentina	Matera	Auction, €2,000
21 June 2011	Nicola Ferrari	Fano	Sassuolo	Sassuolo	€10,000
24 June 2011	Andrea Ferretti	Pavia	Cesena	ND (Pavia)	Free
24 June 2011	Luca Fiuzzi	Monza	Empoli	ND (Monza)	
7 July 2011	Fernando Forestieri	Udinese	Genoa	Udinese	(€100,000)
24 June 2011	Massimo Fornoni	Siracusa	Crotone	ND (Siracusa)	
24 June 2011	Gianluca Franciosi	Valenzana	Atalanta	Valenzana	Free
22 June 2011	Federico Furlan	Varese	Milan	Varese	€10,000
24 June 2011	Manolo Gabbiadini	Cittadella	Atalanta	Atalanta	Undisclosed
22 June 2011	Marco Gaeta	Varese	Milan	Milan	peppercorn
24 June 2011	Niccolò Galli	Pergocrema	Parma	Parma	€125,000 (part of Petrozzi)
23 June 2011	Daniele Galloppa	Parma	Siena	Parma	€5M (Ângelo+Reginaldo)
25 June 2011	Marco Gallozzi	Padova	Foligno	Padova	Auction, Undisclosed
5 July 2011	Alberto Galuppo	Cesena	Parma	Parma	€1M
24 June 2011	Daniele Gasparetto	Cittadella	Atalanta	Cittadella	Undisclosed
20 June 2011	Marcello Gazzola	Ascoli	Catania	Ascoli	€500
24 June 2011	Andrea Gavazzeni	Tritium	Atalanta	ND (Tritium)	Free
23 June 2011	Abdelkader Ghezzal	Bari	Siena	Bari	€2.25M (Belmonte+Carobbio+Kamatà)
17 June 2011	Shadi Ghosheh	Bassano	Chievo	Bassano	€15,000
25 June 2011	Stefano Giacomelli	Pescara	Foligno	Pescara	Auction, Undisclosed
23 June 2011	Nicolas Giani	Vicenza	Internazionale	Renewed	—
24 June 2011	Abel Gigli	Atletico Roma	Parma	Parma	€500
24 June 2011	Giuseppe Giovinco	Carrarese	Juventus	Renewed	—
24 June 2011	Michael Girasole	AlbinoLeffe	Atalanta	Renewed	—
25 June 2011	Paolo Grossi	AlbinoLeffe	Varese	Varese	Auction, €455,000
24 June 2011	Nicolás Gorobsov	Torino	Vicenza	Renewed	—
24 June 2011	Stefano Guberti	Sampdoria	Roma	Roma	€500
24 June 2011	Robert Gucher	Genoa	Frosinone	Renewed	—
24 June 2011	Roberto Guitto	Ravenna	Empoli	Empoli	Undisclosed
24 June 2011	Jan Hable	Ascoli	Fiorentina	ND (Ascoli)	Free
23 June 2011	Edmund Hottor (Ghana)	Milan	Triestina	Milan	€100,000
24 June 2011	Simone Iacoponi	Foligno	Empoli	Empoli	Undisclosed
24 June 2011	Antony Iannarilli	Isola Liri	Lazio	Lazio	Undisclosed
24 June 2011	Christian Iannelli	Milazzo	Catania	ND (Milazzo)	
23 June 2011	Carlo Ilari	Juventus	Ascoli	Renewed	—
25 June 2011	Roberto Inglese	Chievo	Pescara	Chievo	Auction, €129,000
24 June 2011	Lorenzo Insigne	Foggia	Napoli	Napoli	€500
25 June 2011	Antimo Iunco	Torino	Chievo	Chievo	Auction, €99,000
24 June 2011	Boško Janković (Serbia)	Genoa	Palermo	ND (Genoa)	Free
23 June 2011	Pedro Kamata	Bari	Siena	Siena	€500,000 (part of Ghezzal)
24 June 2011	Rene Krhin	Bologna	Internazionale	Renewed	—
24 June 2011	Antonio Lamenza	Poggibonsi	Reggina	Reggina	Undisclosed
24 June 2011	Davide Lanzafame	Palermo	Juventus	ND (Palermo)	Free
24 June 2011	Fabrizio Lasagna	Milazzo	Catania	ND (Milazzo)	
24 June 2011	Flavio Lazzari	Empoli	Udinese	Renewed	—
22 June 2011	Fabio Lebran	AlbinoLeffe	Parma	Renewed	—
22 June 2011	Elia Legati	Padova	Milan	Padova	€660,000
24 June 2011	Matteo Legittimo	Salernitana	Lecce	Lecce	Undisclosed
24 June 2011	Giacomo Lepri	San Marino	Fiorentina	ND (San Marino)	Free
22 June 2011	Francesco Lodi	Catania	Empoli	Catania	Undisclosed
24 June 2011	Lorenzo Lollo	Spezia	Fiorentina	Renewed	—
23 June 2011'	Fabio Lucioni	Barletta	Siena	Siena	€500
23 June 2011	Davide Luppi	Viareggio	Sassuolo	Sassuolo	€10,000
24 June 2011	Arturo Lupoli	Ascoli	Fiorentina	ND (Ascoli)	Free
24 June 2011	Andrea Lussardi	Internazionale	Piacenza	Piacenza	€900,000 (player exchange)
23 June 2011	Giovanni Madiotto	Bassano	Chievo	Chievo	€250
24 June 2011	Nicola Madonna	Atalanta	AlbinoLeffe	Atalanta	€1,500
24 June 2011	Antonio Magli	Como	Brescia	Brescia	€10,000
25 June 2011	Pasquale Maiorino	Brindisi	Vicenza	Vicenza	Auction, €500
24 June 2011	Alessandro Malomo	Prato	Roma	Renewed	—
24 June 2011	Dominique Malonga	Cesena	Torino	Cesena	€1.4M
25 June 2011	Manuel Mancini	Verona	Siena	Verona	Auction, €500
24 June 2011	Marco Mancosu	Siracusa	Cagliari	Cagliari	Undisclosed (cash plus Verachi
24 June 2011	Andrea Mandorlini	Vicenza	Ascoli	Vicenza	€400,000 (swap with Reali)
24 June 2011	Nicolò Manfredini	Reggiana	Fiorentina	Fiorentina	€215,000
24 June 2011	Riccardo Maniero	Pescara	Juventus	Renewed	—
25 June 2011	Daniele Mannini	Sampdoria	Napoli	Napoli	Auction, €500
24 June 2011	Alessio Manzoni	Parma	Atalanta	ND (Parma)	Free
24 June 2011	Mattia Maragna	Gavorrano	Chievo	Renewed	—
24 June 2011	Mattia Marchi	South Tyrol	Chievo	South Tyrol	€500
20 June 2011	Salvatore Margarita	Catania	Ascoli	Ascoli	€1.3M (part of Moretti)
	Daniele Marino	Melfi	AlbinoLeffe	ND	
24 June 2011	Piergiuseppe Maritato	Reggiana	Fiorentina	Fiorentina	€100,000
14 June 2011	Massimiliano Marsili	Nocerina	Varese	Nocerina	Undisclosed
24 June 2011	Bruno Martella	Sampdoria	Pescara	Renewed	—
24 June 2011	Salvatore Masiello	Bari	Udinese	Bari	Undisclosed
24 June 2011	Emiliano Massimo	Aversa	Roma	Roma	€30,000
24 June 2011	Leonardo Massoni	Verona	Sassuolo	Sassuolo	€500
24 June 2011	Kelvin Matute (Cameroon)	Crotone	Udinese	ND (Crotone)	
24 June 2011	Matteo Mazzetto	Vibonese	Padova	ND (Vibonese)	
24 June 2011	Antonio Mazzotta	Lecce	Palermo	Renewed	—
24 June 2011	Fabio Meduri	Monza	Atalanta	ND (Monza)	Free
24 June 2011	Riccardo Meggiorini	Bologna	Genoa	Genoa	€3M (swap with Rodríguez)
24 June 2011	Andrea Mei	Piacenza	Internazionale	Internazionale	€750,000 (player exchange)
24 June 2011	Andrea Mengoni	Pescara	Chievo	ND (Pescara)	Free
24 June 2011	Matteo Merini	Carrarese	Chievo	Renewed	—
	Giorgio Merlano	Viareggio	Juventus	Viareggio	
24 June 2011	Ivan Merli Sala	Foligno	Chievo	Renewed	—
24 June 2011	Mario Merlonghi	Fondi	Parma	ND (Fondi)	
24 June 2011	Andrea Migliorini	SPAL	Livorno	Renewed	—
23 June 2011	Mattia Minesso	Chievo	Vicenza	Vicenza	€1M (swap with A.Benedetti)
24 June 2011	Gianvito Misuraca	Vicenza	Palermo	Renewed	—
25 June 2011	Nemanja Mitrovic	Bologna	Internazionale	Bologna	Auction, €1,500
24 June 2011	Lorenzo Morelli	Prato	Fiorentina	Prato	€500
20 June 2011	Federico Moretti	Ascoli	Catania	Catania	€2M (Capece+Margarita)
24 June 2011	Archimede Morleo	Bologna	Crotone	Bologna	€550,000
25 June 2011	Gianni Munari	Lecce	Palermo	Palermo	Auction, Undisclosed
24 June 2011	Felice Natalino	Internazionale	Genoa	Renewed	—
24 June 2011	Maikol Negro	Nocerina	Catania	Renewed	—
24 June 2011	Erik Nesca	Bellaria	Cesena	ND (Bellaria)	Free
24 June 2011	Joel Obi (Nigeria)	Parma	Internazionale	Renewed	—
24 May 2011	Nnamdi Oduamadi (Nigeria)	Genoa	Milan	Milan	€3.5M (part of Papastathopoulos)
22 June 2011	Wilfred Osuji (Nigeria)	Varese	Milan	Milan	€310,000
15 June 2011	Andrea Paolucci	Andria	Fiorentina	Renewed	—
24 June 2011	Raffaele Palladino	Parma	Juventus	ND (Parma)	Free
24 May 2011	Alberto Paloschi	Genoa	Milan	Milan	€5M
24 June 2011	Francesco Pambianchi	Pergocrema	Parma	Parma	€125,000 (part of Petrozzi)
24 June 2011	Michele Paolucci	Siena	Juventus	ND (Siena)	Free
24 June 2011	Gabriele Paonessa	Parma	Bologna	Renewed	—
24 June 2011	Salvatore Papa	Foligno	Chievo	Renewed	—
24 June 2011	Daniele Paponi	Bologna	Parma	Renewed	—
22 June 2011	Marco Parolo	Cesena	Chievo	Cesena	€3M
24 June 2011	Riccardo Pasi	Parma	Bologna	Bologna	€1.6M (€0.1M + Elia)
24 June 2011	Edoardo Pazzagli	Prato	Fiorentina	Fiorentina	€500
22 June 2011	Jordan Pedrocchi	Chievo	Milan	Chievo	peppercorn
24 June 2011	Leonardo Pérez	Pisa	Bari	ND (Pisa)	Free
25 June 2011	Simone Pesce	Catania	Ascoli	Ascoli	Auction, €550
24 June 2011	Alessio Petti	Bellaria	Cesena	Cesena	€500
24 June 2011	Andrea Picone	Barletta	Reggina	Reggina	Undisclosed
24 June 2011	Federico Piovaccari	Cittadella	Ravenna	Cittadella	Undisclosed
24 June 2011	Mattia Piras	Genoa	Pergocrema	ND (Genoa)	Free
24 June 2011	Nicola Piras	Rodengo Saiano	Chievo	ND (Rodengo Saiano)	Free
23 June 2011	Fabio Pisacane	Lumezzane	Chievo	Lumezzane	Undisclosed
24 June 2011	Andrea Pisanu	Bologna	Parma	Bologna	€2.5M (part of Valiani)
23 June 2011	Samuele Pizza	Viareggio	Empoli	Viareggio	Undisclosed
18 August 2011	Jonas Portin	Padova	Ascoli	Padova	Undisclosed
24 June 2011	Antonino Profeta	Pergocrema	Catania	ND (Pergocrema)	
24 June 2011	Girolamo Provenzano	Matera	Udinese	Matera	Undisclosed
24 June 2011	Gabriele Puccio	Portogruaro	Internazionale	Renewed	—
24 June 2011	Ivan Reali	Ascoli	Vicenza	Ascoli	€400,000 (swap with Mandorlini)
23 June 2011	Reginaldo (Brazil)	Siena	Parma	Siena	€2.5M (part of Galloppa)
24 June 2011	Vasco Regini	Sampdoria	Cesena	Renewed	—
24 June 2011	Giovanni Ricciardo	Milazzo	Catania	ND (Milazzo)	
23 June 2011	Luca Righini	Vicenza	Cesena	Renewed	—
22 June 2011	Michele Rigione	Internazionale	Chievo	Internazionale	€500,000 (swap with Andreolli)
16 June 2011	Nicola Rigoni	Palermo	Vicenza	Vicenza	€200,000 (swap with Di Matteo)
22 June 2011	Rincón (Brazil)	Chievo	Internazionale	Chievo	peppercorn
24 June 2011	Andrea Rispoli	Parma	Brescia	Parma	Free
24 June 2011	Samon Reider Rodríguez	Bassano	Juventus	ND (Bassano)	
24 June 2011	Alessandro Romeo	Ascoli	Sampdoria	Sampdoria	
22 June 2011	Daniele Rosania	Chievo	Ascoli	Ascoli	€500,000 (swap with Tanaglia)
24 June 2011	Aleandro Rosi	Siena	Roma	Roma	€700,000
24 June 2011	Fausto Rossi	Vicenza	Juventus	Renewed	—
23 June 2011	Giovanni Rossi	SPAL	Cesena	Renewed	—
24 June 2011	Andrea Rossini	Foligno	Cesena	Cesena	€150,000
24 June 2011	Jonathan Rossini	Udinese	Sampdoria	Renewed	—
24 June 2011	Danilo Russo	Vicenza	Genoa	Genoa	€500
24 June 2011	Simone Sales	Cremonese	Atalanta	ND (Cremonese)	Free
13 August 2011	Amidu Salifu (Ghana)	Fiorentina	Vicenza	Fiorentina	€850,000
24 June 2011	Gianluca Sansone	Frosinone	Siena	Siena	€800,000
24 June 2011	Michele Sansotta	Sangiovannese	Chievo	ND (Sangiovannese)	Free
31 August 2011	Marco Sau	Foggia	Cagliari	Cagliari	Undisclosed
23 June 2011	Alessandro Scialpi	Varese	Lecce	Renewed	—
25 June 2011	Matteo Scozzarella	Portogruaro	Atalanta	Atalanta	Auction, Undisclosed
24 June 2011	Giuseppe Sculli	Lazio	Genoa	Lazio	€3M
24 June 2011	Alessio Sestu	Siena	Vicenza	Siena	€525,000 (Danti + €0.1M)
24 June 2011	Federico Sevieri	Lumezzane	Lazio	Renewed	—
25 June 2011	Nicholas Siega	Casale	Atalanta	Casale	Undisclosed
22 June 2011	Matteo Solini	Internazionale	Chievo	Renewed	—
24 June 2011	Stefano Spagna	Melfi	Chievo	Renewed	—
21 June 2011	Alen Stevanović	Torino	Internazionale	Renewed	—
24 June 2011	Luca Stocchi	Piacenza	Internazionale	ND (Piacenza)	Free
24 May 2011	Rodney Strasser (Sierra Leone)	Genoa	Milan	Milan	€2.25M (part of Papastathopoulos)
24 June 2011	Cristian Suarino	Milazzo	Catania	Catania	Undisclosed
24 June 2011	Lorenzo Tafi	Prato	Fiorentina	Fiorentina	€500
24 June 2011	Massimiliano Tagliani	Ravenna	Fiorentina	Renewed	— (bankruptcy)
22 June 2011	Filippo Tanaglia	Ascoli	Chievo	Chievo	€500,000 (swap with Rosania)
24 June 2011	Andrea Tecchio	Sambonifacese	Vicenza	ND (Sambonifacese)	Free
17 June 2011	Mame Baba Thiam (Senegal)	Internazionale	Sassuolo	Renewed	—
24 June 2011	Fernando Tissone	Sampdoria	Udinese	Renewed	—
22 June 2011	Davide Tonani	Chievo	Internazionale	Chievo	peppercorn
23 June 2011	Denis Tonucci	Vicenza	Cesena	Renewed	—
24 June 2011	Ernesto Torregrossa	Verona	Udinese	Verona	Undisclosed
24 June 2011	Mirko Traversi	Mezzocorona	Brescia	ND (Mezzocorona)	Free
24 June 2011	Luca Tremolada	Piacenza	Internazionale	Internazionale	€750,000 (player exchange)
24 June 2011	Matteo Trini	Lumezzane	Juventus	Juventus	Undisclosed
24 June 2011	Alessio Tombesi	Atletico Roma	Parma	Renewed	— (bankruptcy)
24 June 2011	Juri Toppan	Spezia	Internazionale	ND (Spezia)	Free
23 June 2011	Giacomo Tulli	Cesena	Vicenza	Renewed	—
24 June 2011	Francesco Valiani	Parma	Bologna	Parma	€2.8M (Pisanu + €0.3M)
20 June 2011	Mattia Valoti	Milan	AlbinoLeffe	Renewed	—
25 June 2011	Marco Valtulina	Juve Stabia	Torino	ND (Juve Stabia)	
24 June 2011	Daniele Vantaggiato	Padova	Parma	ND (Padova)	Free
24 June 2011	Dario Venitucci	Bassano	Juventus	ND (Bassano)	
20 June 2011	Enrico Verachi	San Marino	Cagliari	Cagliari	Undisclosed
22 June 2011	Dani Verruschi	Foggia	Reggina	Reggina	Undisclosed
20 June 2011	Mauro Vigorito	Carrarese	Cagliari	Cagliari	Undisclosed
24 June 2011	Ricardo Villar (Argentina)	Triestina	Udinese	ND (Triestina)	
24 June 2011	Sergio Viotti	Triestina	Brescia	Triestina	€50,000
25 June 2011	Emiliano Viviano	Internazionale	Bologna	Internazionale	Auction, €4.1M
24 June 2011	Francesco Volpe	Livorno	Juventus	ND (Livorno)	Free
24 June 2011	Massimo Volta	Sampdoria	Parma	Sampdoria	€900,000
24 June 2011	Wellington (Brazil)	Pisa	Udinese	ND (Pisa)	
24 June 2011	Davide Zappacosta	Atalanta	Isola Liri	Renewed	—
24 May 2011	Gianmarco Zigoni	Genoa	Milan	Milan	€3.75M (part of Papastathopoulos)
24 June 2011	Francesco Zizzari	Reggina	Pescara	ND (Reggnia)	
