= Filippo Tanaglia =

Italian footballer

Personal information
- Date of birth: 26 May 1990 (age 36)
- Place of birth: Verona, Italy
- Height: 1.76 m (5 ft 9 in)
- Positions: Right winger; right-back

Team information
- Current team: Castelnuovo

Youth career
- Chievo

Senior career*
Years	Team	Apps	(Gls)
2010–2012	Chievo	0	(0)
2010–2012	→ Giacomense (loan)	47	(3)
2012–2014	Alessandria	24	(1)
2014–2015	Correggese	6	(0)
2015	Legnago	10	(0)
2015–2019	Villafranca	66	(4)
2019–2020	ASD Sona		
2020–2023	ASD Montorio FC		
2021	→ FCD Valgatara (loan)		
2023–2024	Real Valpolicella		
2024–	Castelnuovo		
- * Club domestic league appearances and goals as of 20 February 2026

Filippo Tanaglia (born 26 May 1990) is an Italian footballer who plays as a winger for Castelnuovo.

== Biography ==
=== Youth career ===
Tanaglia started his professional career in A.C. ChievoVerona. Since 2007–08 season Tanaglia was in the reserve for the "spring" league, but did not play any game in the first one. Tanaglia also played for its Allievi Regionali under-16 team in 2005–06 season and Allievi U17 team in 2006–07 season.

=== Ascoli and Chievo swap ===
On 29 June 2010, one day before the closure of 2009–10 financial year, Tanaglia was transferred to Ascoli in exchange with Daniele Rosania. Both club retained co-ownership deal and the 50% registration rights was valued €500,000. Tanaglia signed a 5-year contract. Both clubs also swapped players before the closure of the financial year, made both clubs had a positive equity. On Chievo side, the net asset was €687,180 but boosted with new signing Minesso (€2M) and Rosania (€1M), while Ascoli's net equity of €527,438 was contributed by recent signing of Moretti (€4M), Tanaglia (€1M) and Reali (€0.8M). Except Moretti, Tanaglia and Reali did not made his Serie B debut yet nor in Ascoli's 2010–11 Serie B squad.

Tanaglia was immediately left for Lega Pro Seconda Divisione club Giacomense. Tanaglia only played half of the possible league matches (30 matches). In June 2011 both Tanaglia and Rosania returned to their mother club for the same price (€500,000 for 50% rights), made both players "worth" €1 million in accounting. In June 2011 Chievo and Ascoli made swap deals again with other clubs, despite both club had re-capitalized €250,000 and €500,000 respectively, the net asset (net equity) was again boosted by the recent signing. Chievo had a net asset of €679,516 on 30 June 2011, but composite with A.Bassoli (€3M), Benedetti (€2M) and Tanaglia (€1M), while Ascoli's €1,198,321 net asset was also boosted by Zsolt Tamási (€3.4M), Margarita (€2.6M), Capece (€1.4M) and Rosania (€1M)

As Chievo failed to find a new buyer for Tanaglia, or would suffered a huge write-down, Chievo decided to renew Tanaglia's temporary deal, as the amortization of the €1 million transfer fee was in installments and would have had a smaller impact on 2011–12 financial year than a single write-down. Tanaglia was a regular player for Giacomense in 2011–12 Lega Pro Seconda Divisione.

=== From Lega Pro to Serie D ===
In July 2012 he moved to Alessandria, where he spent 2 seasons. On 25 September 2014 he was signed by Serie D club Correggese.

In July 2019, Tanaglia joined ASD Sona Calcio.
