= Daniele Rosania =

Italian footballer (born 1991)

Personal information
- Date of birth: 22 March 1991 (age 35)
- Place of birth: Terracina, Italy
- Height: 1.92 m (6 ft 4 in)
- Position: Centre back

Team information
- Current team: Anzio
- Number: 24

Youth career
- Macir Cisterna
- Lupa Frascati
- Latina
- 2009–2011: Ascoli

Senior career*
Years	Team	Apps	(Gls)
2011–2014	Ascoli	4	(0)
2011–2013	→ Lanciano (loan)	25	(0)
2014	→ Catanzaro (loan)	1	(0)
2014–2015	Pordenone	23	(0)
2015–2016	Paganese	13	(0)
2016	Juve Stabia	3	(0)
2016	Grosseto	11	(0)
2016–2017	Matelica	10	(0)
2017–2018	Taranto	22	(1)
2018–2019	Racing Aprilia	26	(0)
2019–2020	Audace Cerignola	15	(1)
2020–2021	Cynthialbalonga	14	(1)
2021–2022	Aprilia Calcio	21	(0)
2022–2023	Pomezia	24	(0)
2023–2024	Terracina		
2024–2025	SSD Valmontone 1921		
2025–	Anzio	0	(0)
- * Club domestic league appearances and goals as of 18:05, 7 February 2026 (UTC)

Daniele Rosania (born 22 March 1991) is an Italian footballer who plays as a centre back for Anzio.

== Biography ==
=== Youth career ===
Born in Terracina, the Province of Latina, Lazio, Rosania started his career at Macir Cisterna. He then left for Lupa Frascati, 20 km away from Rome. He was selected to Lazio region Allievi representative team in 2007. Rosania later joined Latina. In January 2009 Rosania left for Serie B club Ascoli Calcio 1898, where he spent 2 1/2 seasons in the reserve league from 2009 to 2011.

=== Ascoli–Chievo swap ===
In June 2010, few days before the closure of 2009–10 financial year, Rosania left for Serie A club Chievo, in exchange with Filippo Tanaglia. Both clubs purchased half of the registration rights which "valued" €500,000. The deals made both clubs had notional selling profit. (Note: It made both clubs had a selling profit (but received in form of another intangible asset) as well as generated a cost to next few seasons to amortize the €1 million price tag in instalments and lastly VAT. On 30 June 2010, with the boost of the recent signing, both clubs had a positive net equity of €527,438 and €687,180 respectively, but including Moretti (€4M), Tanaglia (€1M) and Reali (€0.8M). Except Moretti, Tanaglia and Reali did not made his Serie B debut yet and did not include in Ascoli 2010–11 squad. On Chievo side, it was boosted by Minesso (€2M) and Rosania (€1M), which was not include in Chievo 2010–11 Serie A squad either.)

Rosania returned to Ascoli Piceno immediately on 2 July 2010. He made 16 league appearances in the reserve league that season.

=== Ascoli return ===
In June 2011 both Rosania and Tanaglia returned to their mother clubs for €500,000. Rosania signed a 4-year contract, but became a financial burden of the club. (Note: With other new signing, Ascoli and Chievo again had a positive net asset of €1,198,321 and €679,516 respectively, which included the re-capitalization of €500,000 and €250,000, as well as the effect of the new signing Tamási (€3.4M), Margarita (€2.6M), Capece (€1.4M) and Rosania (€1M). Along with Reali, all the players were left for Lega Pro clubs in temporary deal, and created an extra amortization cost of €680,000 (Tamási) [€3,400,000 over 5-year deal] to 2011–12 financial year, which it already raised from €1,393,100 (2009–10) to €2,795,023 in 2010–11 (€200,000 from Tanaglia, €800,000 from Moretti). On Chievo side, the net asset was boosted by A.Bassoli (€3M), Benedetti (€2M) and Tanaglia (€1M).)

Rosania was awarded a temporary first team number of no.91 shirt in August 2011.

==== Lanciano (loan) ====
On 31 August 2011 Rosania left for Lanciano along with Capece and Margarita, On the same day Tamási also left the club in temporary deal, made none of the expensive new signing actually played for Ascoli in 2011–12 season. Rosania won promotion to Serie B for Lanciano in 2012. The temporary deal of Rosania was renewed in 2012–13 season.

==== Third Spell with Ascoli ====
Rosania returned to Ascoli on 1 July 2013, which the club had to play in the third division after relegation. Rosania made his Ascoli debut during the first half of the season.

==== Catanzaro (loan) ====
On 24 January 2014 he was signed by Catanzaro.

=== Pordenone ===
On 20 August 2014 he was signed by Pordenone in a 2-year contract. He was released after the club relegated to Serie D. However, Pordenone and the future club of Rosania, Paganese, they were re-admitted to 2015–16 Lega Pro to replace the vacancies.

=== Paganese ===
On 3 September 2015 Rosania was signed by Paganese.
