= Ivan Reali =

Italian footballer (born 1991)

Personal information
- Date of birth: 2 January 1991 (age 35)
- Place of birth: Sora, Italy
- Height: 1.84 m (6 ft 0 in)
- Position: Left winger

Youth career
- Arce
- 2006–2007: Savio
- 2007–2008: Internazionale
- 2008–2010: Vicenza

Senior career*
Years	Team	Apps	(Gls)
2010–2014	Ascoli	0	(0)
2010–2011	→ Mezzocorona (loan)	5	(0)
2012	→ Foggia (loan)	6	(0)
2013	→ Vallée d’Aoste (loan)	2	(0)
2014–2015	Isola Liri	37	(0)
2015–2017	ASD Città di MSGC		
2017–2019	Sora		
2019–2021	Terracina		
2021–2022	Città di Anagni Calcio		
- * Club domestic league appearances and goals as of 17:27, 7 February 2026 (UTC)

Ivan Reali (born 2 January 1991) is an Italian footballer who plays as a left winger.

== Career ==
=== Youth career ===
Born in Sora, the Province of Frosinone, Lazio, Reali started his career at Arce, located in the town of the same name, also in the Province of Frosinone. Reali played for Arce's Giovanissimi U15 team. He then left for A.S.D. Savio S.r.l., from Rome, capital of Italy and Lazio region. Reali was the losing semifinalists of Lazio regional Allievi Fascia B league to S.S. Lazio. He was selected to Lazio region Allievi (literally Student) representative team in March 2007.

In July 2007 he was signed by F.C. Internazionale Milano. He won the champion of Allievi Nazionali league with the under-17 team in 2008. In August 2008 he left for Vicenza. That transfer window Inter signed Jean Mbida (co-ownership) and Renan Wagner (loan, €20,000) from Vicenza and transferred Nicolas Giani (co-ownership), Ivan Fatić (loan), Reali (loan) and Renato Ricci (loan) to Vicenza, made Inter paid Vicenza around €79,500 in net in that window. In August 2009 Inter transferred Reali to Vicenza on free transfer, and made a write-down of around €23,000 for the residual value of his contract. With Vicenza, he spent 2 seasons in Primavera (literally Spring) under-20 team from 2008 to 2010.

=== Senior career ===
On 29 June 2010, few days before the end of 2009–10 season and the financial year of the company, he joined fellow Serie B club Ascoli in co-ownership deal for €0.4 million, signing 4-year contract. Co-currently, Vicenza signed Andrea Mandorlini, also in co-ownership deal for €0.4 million. The deal made Ascoli and Vicenza had a financial benefit, rather than an immediate boost to the squad. (Note: Both had a positive equity on 30 June 2010, which Vicenza was €5,171,680, however Vicenza's main asset, the intangible asset (player contract), was composite with Benedetti (€2M), Tonucci (€2.6M), Righini (€0.9M), Mandorlini (€0.8M), all signed by player exchange and days before the closure of the financial year. The Vicenza squad also contained a ghost player Di Donato who "worth" €0.8 million on 30 June 2010. Except Tonucci, none of the players actually played for Vicenza and Vicenza sold its youth internationals defender Davide Brivio for just €1.5 million. On Ascoli side, the net equity of €527,438 was composite with recent signing of Moretti (€4M), Tanaglia (€1M) and Reali (€0.8M). Except Moretti, Tanaglia and Reali did not made his Serie B debut yet.)

In July 2010, he left for Mezzocorona, joining Ascoli team-mate Luca Cognigni, Fabio Conocchioli and Vicenza team-mate Filippo Forò.

In June 2011 Vicenza sold the remains 50% registration rights to Ascoli for €0.4 million, co-currently Mandorlini also joined Vicenza outright. However, he did not enter the first team squad nor loaned out. In October 2011, Ascoli offered him along with Conocchioli and 4 other players to terminate their contract. On 31 January 2012 Foggia swapped Giovanni Tomi with Reali.

In January 2013 he left the club again for St.Christophe Aosta Valley. On 1 July 2013 Reali returned to Ascoli. He received a call-up against Ponte San Pietro on 3 August.

After one and a half seasons with Isola Liri in Serie D, Reali left the club in December 2015 to join A.S.D. Città Monte San Giovanni Campano. He left the club in the summer 2017 and then joined A.S.D. G.C. Sora. In December 2019, Reali joined Promozione club Terracina Calcio 1925.
