= David Mounard =

French footballer (born 1980)

Personal information
- Date of birth: 27 October 1980 (age 46)
- Place of birth: Chantilly, France
- Height: 1.76 m (5 ft 9 in)
- Position: Midfielder

Team information
- Current team: Ariano Irpino

Youth career
- 2002–2003: Chantilly

Senior career*
Years	Team	Apps	(Gls)
2003–2004	Mons	13	(1)
2004–2008	Foggia	107	(21)
2008–2010	Gallipoli	63	(5)
2010–2011	Siena	1	(0)
2011	→ Benevento (loan)	10	(1)
2011–2015	Salerno	29	(11)
2015	Catanzaro	16	(0)
2015	Agropoli	6	(0)
2016–2017	ASD Picciola	?	(2)
2017–2018	Battipagliese	?	(4)
2018–2019	Ebolitana	16	(1)
2019–2020	Ariano Irpino	?	(?)
- * Club domestic league appearances and goals as of 3 January 2020

David Mounard (born 27 October 1980) is a French footballer who plays for Ariano Irpino.

Mounard was signed by Mons of Belgian First Division in 2003. In 2004, he left the relegated Mons for Foggia at Italian Serie C1.

In the summer 2008, he was signed by Gallipoli, with whom he also played at Serie B level. In August 2010, he was signed by Siena, but played only a spare league game before joining Benevento on loan during the winter 2011 transfer window. He joined Serie D club Salerno, founded earlier that year as direct heir of excluded local club Salernitana.

== Honours ==
- Lega Pro Prima Divisione: 2009
