= Riccardo Capogna =

Italian footballer

Personal information
- Date of birth: 30 March 1988 (age 38)
- Place of birth: Rome, Italy
- Height: 1.85 m (6 ft 1 in)
- Position: Striker

Team information
- Current team: Tritium

Youth career
- Lazio

Senior career*
Years	Team	Apps	(Gls)
2007–2008	Lazio	0	(0)
2007–2008	→ Chiasso (loan)	7	(0)
2008–2009	Mezzocorona	6	(0)
2009–2010	Carpenedolo	31	(4)
2010–2012	Parma	0	(0)
2010–2011	→ Fondi (loan)	16	(3)
2011	→ Renate (loan)	14	(3)
2012	→ Pro Patria (loan)	3	(0)
2012–2013	Chieti	16	(0)
2013–2015	Lecco	64	(27)
2015–2017	Seregno	63	(22)
2017–2018	Gozzano	36	(17)
2018–2021	Lecco	82	(28)
2021–2023	Pro Sesto	62	(10)
2023–	Tritium	0	(0)

International career
2004	Italy U-17	1	(0)
- * Club domestic league appearances and goals as of 22 April 2023

Riccardo Capogna (born 30 March 1988) is an Italian professional footballer who plays as a forward for Promozione club Baranzatese 1948.

== Club career ==
He returned to Lecco in the summer of 2018 in Serie D. Following Lecco's promotion to Serie C, on 5 July 2019, he signed a new contract with the club.

On 14 July 2021, he moved to Pro Sesto.
