= Loris Palazzo =

Italian footballer

Personal information
- Date of birth: 9 February 1991 (age 35)
- Place of birth: Bari, Italy
- Height: 1.78 m (5 ft 10 in)
- Position: Forward

Team information
- Current team: Bitonto

Youth career
- 2007–2008: Bari

Senior career*
Years	Team	Apps	(Gls)
2008–2009	Liberty Bari	30	(6)
2008–2009	Casarano	28	(6)
2010–2011	Andria	1	(0)
2011–2012	Bisceglie		(1)
2012–2013	Foggia	31	(8)
2013–2014	Mandredonia	12	(3)
2014	Bisceglie	20	(6)
2014	Bitonto	2	(0)
2015	Nardò	2	(0)
2015–2016	Bisceglie	13	(3)
2016–2018	Monza	64	(28)
2018	Latina	16	(5)
2018–2019	Team Altamura	34	(11)
2019–2020	Fidelis Andria	25	(10)
2020	Brindisi	5	(3)
2020–2021	Bitonto	24	(7)
2021–2022	Cerignola	33	(9)
2022–	Bitonto	34	(10)
- * Club domestic league appearances and goals as of 20 December 2023

Loris Palazzo (born 9 February 1991) is an Italian footballer who plays for Serie D club Bitonto.

== Honours ==
=== Club ===
Monza

- Serie D: 2016-17
- Scudetto Dilettanti: 2016-17
