= Samuele Modica =

Italian footballer

Personal information
- Date of birth: 5 July 1991 (age 35)
- Position: Defender

Team information
- Current team: Campobasso

Youth career
- Livorno

Senior career*
| Years | Team | Apps | (Gls) |
| 2010–2011 | Livorno | 2 | (0) |
| 2010–2011 | → Viareggio (loan) | 1 | (0) |
| 2011– | Campobasso | 27 | (0) |
- * Club domestic league appearances and goals as of 2 October 2012

Samuele Modica (born 5 July 1991) is an Italian professional football player currently playing for Campobasso.

He made his Serie A debut for A.S. Livorno Calcio on 25 April 2010 in a game against Calcio Catania when he came on as a substitute in the 80th minute for Cristian Raimondi.

On 15 July 2010 he was loaned to Viareggio. He only played once in the league and 5 times in the cup.
