= Carlo Ilari =

Italian footballer (born 1991)

Personal information
- Date of birth: 12 December 1991 (age 34)
- Place of birth: Ancona, Italy
- Height: 1.85 m (6 ft 1 in)
- Position: Midfielder

Team information
- Current team: Ravenna
- Number: 6

Youth career
- 2001–2010: Ascoli
- 2010–2011: Juventus

Senior career*
Years	Team	Apps	(Gls)
2009–2010	Ascoli	2	(1)
2010–2016	Juventus	0	(0)
2011–2012	→ Ascoli (loan)	10	(0)
2012–2013	→ FeralpiSalò (loan)	23	(2)
2013–2014	→ Barletta (loan)	26	(5)
2014–2015	→ Catanzaro (loan)	24	(2)
2015–2016	→ Santarcangelo (loan)	31	(4)
2016–2018	Teramo	72	(8)
2018–2019	Sambenedettese	36	(6)
2019–2021	Teramo	56	(9)
2021–2022	Cesena	32	(4)
2022–2025	Lecco	44	(8)
2023–2024	→ Lumezzane (loan)	13	(4)
2025	→ Ravenna (loan)	11	(1)
2025–	Ravenna	4	(0)
2026	→ Forlì (loan)	10	(1)

International career
2009	Italy U-19	1	(0)
2009	Italy U-20	1	(0)
- * Club domestic league appearances and goals as of 30 April 2026

Carlo Ilari (born 12 December 1991) is an Italian professional footballer who plays as a midfielder for Serie C Group B club Ravenna.

== Club career ==
On 4 July 2019, Ilari returned to Teramo after one season away, signing a two-year contract.

On 16 July 2021, he signed a two-year contract with Cesena.

On 12 July 2022, Ilari moved to Lecco on a two-year contract. On 27 August 2023, he joined Lumezzane on loan with an option to buy.
