= Giacomo Casoli =

Italian professional football player

Personal information
- Date of birth: 15 September 1988 (age 38)
- Place of birth: Gubbio, Italy
- Height: 1.85 m (6 ft 1 in)
- Positions: Winger; attacking midfielder

Team information
- Current team: Flaminia

Youth career
- Gubbio

Senior career*
Years	Team	Apps	(Gls)
2004–2006	Gubbio	7	(0)
2006–2007	Isola Liri	29	(4)
2007–2010	Fiorentina	0	(0)
2008–2009	→ Cassino (loan)	24	(4)
2009–2010	→ Gubbio (loan)	33	(7)
2010–2014	Spezia	62	(8)
2012	→ Pro Vercelli (loan)	10	(1)
2013	→ Empoli (loan)	10	(0)
2013–2014	→ Cremonese (loan)	31	(2)
2014–2016	Como	55	(2)
2016–2018	Matera	86	(13)
2018–2019	Gubbio	18	(2)
2019–2021	Catanzaro	67	(1)
2021–2022	Fidelis Andria	29	(2)
2022–2024	Casertana	64	(7)
2024–	Flaminia	0	(0)
- * Club domestic league appearances and goals as of 5 May 2024

Giacomo Casoli (born 15 September 1988) is an Italian professional football player who plays as a midfielder for Flaminia.

== Career ==
On 5 June 2012 Spezia bought the other half part of property by Fiorentina.

On 12 September 2018, he was signed by Gubbio on a free transfer.

On 31 January 2019, he signed with Catanzaro.

On 25 August 2021, he joined Fidelis Andria.

On 29 July 2022, Casoli moved to Casertana in Serie D.

== Honours ==
Spezia

- Lega Pro Prima Divisione: 2011–12 (Group B)
- Supercoppa di Serie C: 2012
