= Salvatore Margarita =

Italian footballer

Personal information
- Date of birth: 29 April 1990 (age 36)
- Place of birth: Maddaloni, Italy
- Height: 1.87 m (6 ft 2 in)
- Position: Winger

Senior career*
Years	Team	Apps	(Gls)
2010–2015	Ascoli	9	(0)
2011–2012	→ Lanciano (loan)	14	(0)
2012–2013	→ Venezia (loan)	16	(1)
2013–2014	→ Sorrento (loan)	7	(0)
2015	Lupa Roma	10	(0)
2015–2016	ASD Monticelli	30	(10)
2016–2017	Fermana	19	(3)
2017	Jesina	13	(1)
2017–2018	ASD Monticelli	17	(1)
2018–2019	Matelica	31	(7)
- * Club domestic league appearances and goals as of 20 February 2026

Salvatore Margarita (born 29 April 1990) is an Italian footballer who plays as a winger.

== Biography ==
Born in Maddaloni, Campania region, Margarita started his professional career at Marche club Ascoli. He made his Serie B debut on 23 January 2010 against Modena. That season he played a total of 5 Serie B games.

In June 2010 50% registration rights of Margarita and Giorgio Capece were sold to Calcio Catania for a total of €2 million (€1.3 million for Margarita, €700,00 for Capece), however Ascoli only received 50% registration rights of Federico Moretti also "worth" €2 million. The notional €4 million selling revenue had boosted the result of Ascoli's financial year ending on 30 June 2010, but the financial trick also created a financial burden in the next 5 seasons to counter-weight the spending on transfer fee. (Note: Ascoli had €527,438 net asset and net income of €216,383 in 2009–10 financial year However, it also cost €4 million to sign Moretti in 5-year contract, thus Ascoli had to book an amortize cost of €800,000 each season, from 2010 to 2015.) Margarita and Capece also returned to Ascoli in temporary deal for 2010–11 Serie B. In June 2011 all 3 players returned to their mother clubs, yet another financial trick benefiting Ascoli. (Note: The all 3 players returned to their mother clubs for original fee, thus the amortize cost of €800,000 was totally counter-weight by the selling profit of €800,000. However only Moretti had signed 5-year contract (other 2 players signed 4-year), the amortization was merely delayed. Ascoli had to book €1 million a year instead of €800,000 from 2011 to 2015. With another swap deal with Parma, Ascoli had a net income of €170,888 and a net asset of €1,198,321. During that year Ascoli recapitalized for €500,000 only.)

On 30–31 August 2011 Margarita, Capece and Rosania (who returned from Chievo) were signed by the third division club Lanciano in temporary deal, for free, despite they had a total of €5 million price tag in accounting due to swap deals in June 2011. Margarita also played his last game for Ascoli on 30 August. At the end of season Lanciano promoted to Serie B. Margarita made 1 starts and 13 substitutes for the promotion winner. On 1 July 2012 all 3 players returned to Ascoli.

On 22 August 2012 Margarita left for the fourth division club Venezia in another temporary deal. At the end of season Margarita returned to Ascoli, which the club had relegated from Serie B to Lega Pro Prima Divisione.

On 24 August 2013 Margarita was signed by another fourth division club Sorrento, also from Campania. On 17 December 2013 Ascoli bankrupted, with a new company takeover the assets for €862,000 only, which write-down the residual value of player assets to zero, including Margarita, Capece and Rosania "worth" around €1.875 million on 31 December 2013 in accounting. That season Margarita made 5 starts and 2 substitute for Sorrento; the club failed to win the playoffs round of 2013–14 Lega Pro Seconda Divisione in order to remain in Lega Pro, which also saw the two divisions of Lega Pro league had been merged, as well as from 69 teams to 60 teams.

On 29 January 2015 he was signed by Lupa Roma.

On 5 September 2015 he was signed by Monticelli.

On 9 July 2016 he was signed by Fermana F.C.
