= Giorgio Capece =

Italian footballer

Personal information
- Date of birth: 5 March 1992 (age 34)
- Place of birth: Fermo, Italy
- Height: 1.83 m (6 ft 0 in)
- Position: Midfielder

Team information
- Current team: Vigor Lamezia
- Number: 19

Youth career
- –2010: Ascoli

Senior career*
Years	Team	Apps	(Gls)
2010–2014	Ascoli	53	(1)
2011–2012	→ Lanciano (loan)	30	(1)
2014–2015	SPAL	31	(0)
2015–2016	Arezzo	33	(2)
2016–2017	Cosenza	21	(0)
2017–2018	Juve Stabia	9	(0)
2018	→ Fermana (loan)	7	(0)
2019–2020	Paganese	44	(1)
2020–2021	Bitonto	27	(0)
2021–2022	Fermana	29	(0)
2022–2023	Ravenna	20	(0)
2023–2024	Roma City	33	(0)
2024–2025	Civitanovese	30	(4)
2026–	Vigor Lamezia	0	(0)

International career
2012	Italy U20	0	(0)
- * Club domestic league appearances and goals as of 19 February 2026

Giorgio Capece (born 5 March 1992) is an Italian footballer who plays as a midfielder for Serie D club Vigor Lamezia.

== Biography ==
In June 2010, a few days before the closure of 2009–10 financial year (on 30 June), Capece along with Salvatore Margarita were sold to Calcio Catania for a total fee of €2 million in co-ownership deal. Co-currently Ascoli signed half of the registration rights of Federico Moretti also for €2 million. Capece and Margarita also returned to Ascoli for 2010–11 Serie B and the reserve team. In June 2011 the three players returned to their respective clubs. Capece, Margarita and Daniele Rosania were loaned to Lanciano in new 2011–12 Lega Pro Prima Divisione season and won promotion to Serie B. Capece also received an average vote of 6.32/10 by La Gazzetta dello Sport, ranked 8th among players of Lega Pro born 1991 or after.

On 1 September 2014 Capece signed a 1+1 contract with SPAL.

On 16 January 2019 he signed with Paganese.

On 27 September 2020 he joined Serie D club Bitonto.

On 16 August 2021 he returned to his hometown club Fermana on a one-year contract.

On 9 December 2022, he joined Ravenna.
