= Dario Fedi =

Italian footballer (born 1989)

Personal information
- Date of birth: 13 February 1989 (age 37)
- Place of birth: Pistoia, Italy
- Height: 1.82 m (6 ft 0 in)
- Position: Centre back

Team information
- Current team: Tau Calcio Altopascio

Youth career
- Fiorentina

Senior career*
Years	Team	Apps	(Gls)
2009–2010	Fiorentina	0	(0)
2010–2011	Matera	25	(1)
2011–2012	Portogruaro	26	(2)
2012–2013	Fondi	17	(1)
2013–2014	Santarcangelo	29	(1)
2014	Correggese	0	(0)
2014	Rieti	9	(1)
2014–2015	Sambenedettese	8	(1)
2015	OltrepòVoghera	14	(0)
2015–2016	CS Scandicci 1908	17	(1)
2016–2017	Jolly Montemurlo	28	(0)
2017–2018	Seravezza Pozzi	29	(1)
2018–2019	Aglianese	41	(2)
2019–	Tau Calcio Altopascio		
- * Club domestic league appearances and goals

Dario Fedi (born 13 February 1989) is an Italian footballer who plays for ASD Tau Calcio Altopascio. Fedi plays centre-back position but also able to play as a right-back.

== Biography ==
=== Youth career ===
Born in Pistoia, Tuscany, Fedi started his career in Tuscany team Fiorentina. Despite still a player for the reserve team, Fedi also named in List B (youth product) squad for the first team in 2007–08 UEFA Cup, as Fedi had spent more than 2 years with La Viola continuously prior 2007. (Fedi was a member of Fiorentina's Allievi Nazionali under-17 team in 2005–06 season.) Fedi remained in List B in 2008–09 UEFA Champions League However, he was removed in 2009–10 edition. Fedi wore no.37 shirt for the first team in 2007–08 season and no.36 in 2008–09 season.

Fedi was an overage player for Fiorentina's Primavera under-20 reserve team in 2009–10 season, such as in 2010 Torneo di Viareggio. Fedi was a right-back of the team. He also played as a centre-back in 2008–09 season but most of the time on the bench. The team failed to qualify to the playoffs of Primavera League the second successive season (2009 and 2010). Fedi played in the playoffs of 2008 edition.

=== Lega Pro teams ===
In mid-2010 Fedi left for Lega Pro Seconda Divisione club Matera (Italian fourth division) in co-ownership deal, for a peppercorn fee of €500. Fedi was one of the starting defender of the team, such as the game he scored on 8 May 2011. In June both clubs failed to form an agreement and both clubs had to submit a bidding price to Lega Serie A, eventually Matera outbid Fiorentina for €2,000. In July 2011, Fedi was transferred to Lega Pro Prima Divisione (Italian third division) club Portogruaro

=== Later career ===
After a season with Seravezza Pozzi Calcio in Serie D, Fedi moved to fellow league club, Aglianese, where he played until December 2019 before signing with Eccellenza club ASD Tau Calcio Altopascio.
