= Daniel Bradaschia =

Italian footballer (born 1989)

Personal information
- Date of birth: 2 March 1989 (age 37)
- Place of birth: Monfalcone, Italy
- Height: 1.68 m (5 ft 6 in)
- Position: Winger

Youth career
- Treviso
- 2008–2009: Udinese

Senior career*
Years	Team	Apps	(Gls)
2006–2008	Treviso	3	(1)
2008–2009	Udinese	0	(0)
2009–2012	Lumezzane	73	(7)
2012	Taranto	7	(0)
2012–2013	Koper	19	(2)
2013–2014	Darfo Boario	10	(0)
2014	Koper	4	(0)
2014	Darfo Boario	10	(0)
2015	AlbinoLeffe	15	(2)
2016–2017	Triestina	40	(4)
2017–2018	Como	37	(0)
2018–2019	Mestre		
2019	San Donà		
2019–2021	Manzanese	27	(0)
2021	ASD Ancona Lumignacco		
2021–2023	Pro Gorizia		
2023	Cussignacco Calcio		
2024	Forum Julii Calcio		
Total		245	(16)

International career
2006	Italy U17	2	(0)
2007	Italy U18	1	(0)

Managerial career
- 2024–2026: Forum Julii Calcio
- 2026–: US Maranese 1970
- * Club domestic league appearances and goals

Daniel Bradaschia (born 2 March 1989) is an Italian football coach and former professional footballer who is currently as a head coach for US Maranese 1970.
