= Mattia Minesso =

Italian footballer

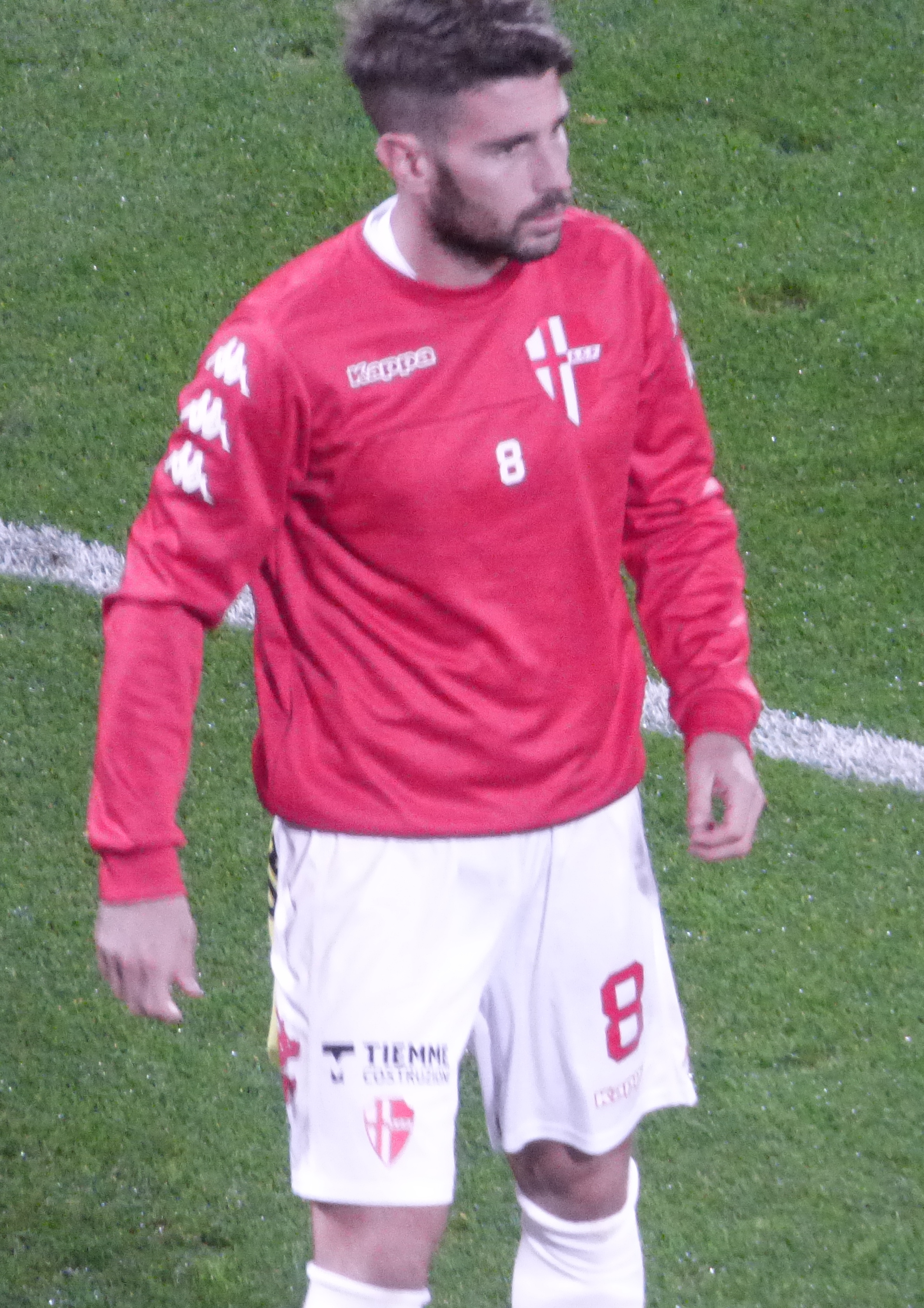
- Minesso in 2018

Personal information
- Date of birth: 30 March 1990 (age 36)
- Place of birth: Cittadella, Italy
- Height: 1.73 m (5 ft 8 in)
- Position: Forward

Team information
- Current team: Luparense
- Number: 11

Youth career
- –2010: Vicenza

Senior career*
Years	Team	Apps	(Gls)
2008–2013	Vicenza	10	(0)
2011–2012	→ Andria (loan)	48	(6)
2013–2016	Cittadella	84	(5)
2014	→ Südtirol (loan)	17	(4)
2016–2018	Bassano	71	(18)
2018–2019	Padova	7	(0)
2019–2021	Pisa	33	(5)
2020–2021	→ Perugia (loan)	24	(9)
2021–2022	Modena	34	(11)
2022–2024	Triestina	45	(2)
2024–2025	Team Altamura	18	(4)
2025–2026	Arzignano	40	(11)
2026–	Luparense	0	(0)
- * Club domestic league appearances and goals as of 30 April 2026

Mattia Minesso (born 30 March 1990) is an Italian professional footballer who plays as a forward for Serie D club Luparense.

== Career ==
=== Vicenza ===
Born in Cittadella, Veneto, Minesso started his career at Vicenza. He made his Serie B debut on 10 May 2008, replacing winger Davide Matteini in the second half. In that match, Vicenza won 2–1 against Frosinone. Minesso also played for Vicenza's Primavera (under-20 team) from 2007 to 2010 after being promoted from its Allievi Nazionali (under-17 team). He did not feature in any games for the first team during the 2009–10 season, but also only played 4 times for the Primavera side that season.

=== Chievo & Andria ===
On 24 June 2010, five days before the closure of the 2009–10 financial year of "A.C. Chievo-Verona s.r.l." and "Vicenza Calcio S.p.A.", Minesso joined Serie A club Chievo, with Amedeo Benedetti moving in the opposite direction. Both players were "valued" at €2 million (thus no cash involved). Co-currently both clubs bought back 50% registration rights for €1M as part of a co-ownership deal. As youth products usually do not have a value as an "intangible asset" (because it was based on historical cost, such as acquired cost, agent fee and training cost), both clubs profited from the sales (but partially offset by VAT and created amortize cost in next few years) On 30 June 2010, Chievo had a positive shareholder equity of €687,180, thus no need to recapitalise (The club did re-capitalise for €250,000 in the 2010–11 financial year). However, Minesso was an "intangible asset" of Chievo, "worth" €2 million at the time, plus Daniele Rosania who was "worth" €1 million. Vicenza also swapped players with Ascoli and Cesena before the closure of the financial year.

Minesso did not remain in Verona, another city of Veneto. Instead he immediately returned to the city of Vicenza (like Giacomo Tulli who was already "sold" to Cesena). Minesso only made 5 league appearances in the 2010–11 Serie B season, as number 9 of the team.

On 7 January 2011, Minesso joined Lega Pro Prima Divisione club Andria, re-joining team-mate Mattia Evangelisti. Minesso played 14 times during the 2010–11 Lega Pro Prima Divisione season, but only made 8 starts.

=== Return to Vicenza ===
In June 2011, both Benedetti and Minesso returned to their parent clubs for the same price (50% rights for €1 million). Again, Chievo had a positive equity of €679,516 and player asset of €20,156,304, but composited with players such as Benedetti (€2M) and Alessandro Bassoli (€3 million, recently joined from Bologna). On Vicenza's side, the club also swapped Simone Tonelli with Cesena before the closure of the 2010–11 financial year.

As Minesso had a "value" of €2 million in accounting, Vicenza failed to find a new club to buy him (or it may have had to write-down the inflated value). Instead his loan was renewed on 16 July 2011.

After Vicenza were relegated, Minesso returned to the club and took part in pre-season. He was confirmed as part of the squad despite Vicenza's re-admission to Serie B for the 2012–13 season on 23 August after Lecce's expulsion. He wore the no.15 shirt.

=== Cittadella ===
On 25 January 2013, Minesso left for another Veneto and Serie B club in Cittadella, which Tommaso Bellazzini moved to opposite direction. On 1 July 2013, Cittadella signed Minesso outright.

=== Bassano ===
On 6 July 2016, he was signed by Bassano Virtus for an undisclosed fee.

=== Padova ===
In June 2018, Minesso was signed by Serie B club Padova, as a free agent.

=== Pisa ===
On 14 January 2019, he signed for Pisa.

=== Perugia ===
On 5 October 2020, Minesso joined Perugia on loan with a conditional obligation to buy.

=== Modena ===
On 9 July 2021, he joined Modena on loan with a conditional obligation to buy. Minesso made his debut on 29 August, the first matchday of the domestic season, in a 0–0 draw against Grosseto, coming on as a substitute for Roberto Ogunseye in the second half. He scored his first goal for the club on 19 September, in a 4–0 away win over Fermana. He scored again the following week as Modena lost 2–1 to Virtus Entella at home, to bring his goal tally to 2 in 3 games.

=== Triestina ===
On 24 August 2022, Minesso signed a two-year contract with Triestina.

== Honours ==
=== Club ===
Cittadella

- Lega Pro: 2015–16 Group A

Perugia

- Serie C: 2020–21 Group B
