= Mattia Bodano =

Italian midfielder

Personal information
- Date of birth: 11 August 1990 (age 36)
- Place of birth: Carbonia, Sardinia, Italy
- Height: 1.87 m (6 ft 2 in)
- Position: Right winger

Team information
- Current team: Progetto Sant'Elia

Youth career
- Cagliari

Senior career*
Years	Team	Apps	(Gls)
2010	→ Gavorrano (loan)	3	(0)
2011	→ Poggibonsi (loan)		
2011–	→ Progetto Sant'Elia (loan)		
- * Club domestic league appearances and goals as of 12 November 2010

Mattia Bodano (born 11 August 1990) is an Italian midfielder, currently on the books of Progetto Calcio Sant'Elia, co-ownership with Cagliari.

== Caps on Italian Series ==
Lega Pro Seconda Divisione : 3 caps

Total : 3 caps
