= Antonino Profeta =

Italian footballer (born 1988)

Personal information
- Date of birth: 26 June 1988 (age 38)
- Place of birth: Italy
- Position: Midfielder

Team information
- Current team: Pergocrema

Senior career*
Years	Team	Apps	(Gls)
2007–2008	Siracusa	29	(1)
2008–2009	Cosenza	16	(0)
2009–2010	Potenza	20	(0)
2010–	Messina	9	(0)
- * Club domestic league appearances and goals as of 13 november 2010

Antonino Profeta (born 26 June 1988) is an Italian forward, currently on the books of Pergocrema.

== Caps on Italian Series ==
Serie C1 : 29 caps

Serie C2 : 16 caps

Serie D : 29 caps, 1 goal

Total : 74 caps, 1 goal
