= Nicholas Costantini =

Italian footballer (born 1989)

Personal information
- Date of birth: 31 July 1989 (age 37)
- Place of birth: Imperia, Italy
- Height: 1.86 m (6 ft 1 in)
- Position: Midfielder

Team information
- Current team: Imperia
- Number: 10

Youth career
- Genoa

Senior career*
Years	Team	Apps	(Gls)
2009–2010	Genoa	0	(0)
2009–2010	→ Ternana (loan)	15	(0)
2010–2011	Lucchese	12	(1)
2011–2012	Foligno	11	(0)
2012	→ Prato (loan)	4	(0)
2012–2013	Imperia	18	(4)
2013–2015	Argentina Arma	29	(7)
2015–2016	Savona	13	(0)
2016–2017	Argentina Arma	38	(11)
2017–2018	Sanremese	25	(1)
2018–2019	Imperia		
2019	Vado	0	(0)
2019–2021	Albenga Sport		
2021–2022	Vado	20	(6)
2022–2023	Albenga Sport		
2023–	Imperia	51	(9)

International career
2005	Italy U17	2	(0)
- * Club domestic league appearances and goals as of 10 November 2026

Nicholas Costantini (born 31 July 1989) is an Italian footballer who plays as a midfielder for Italian Serie D club Imperia.

== Biography ==
Costantini was a member of Genoa C.F.C. reserve team from 2006 to 2009. He also played for Genoa's U17 team since 2004–05 season.

In July 2009, Costantini left for Lega Pro club Ternana. In July 2010, Costantini was sold to Lucchese in co-ownership deal for €500. He only played 3 starts for the Group B side of the third division.

In June 2011 Genoa bought back Costantini for €500 and soon Lucchese went bankrupted. In July 2011 Costantini left for Foligno on free transfer. After 8 starts with the Group A side of the prima divisione, Costantini left for A.C. Prato on 30 January 2012. At the end of season Foligno relegated directly as the least, and Prato had to play relegation "play-out".

Costantini played two friendlies in 2005–06 season for Italy national under-17 football team.

== Honours ==
- Coppa Italia Primavera: 2009 (Genoa youth)
