= Massimo Fornoni =

Italian footballer (born 1989)

Personal information
- Date of birth: 3 February 1989 (age 37)
- Place of birth: Rome, Italy
- Position: Goalkeeper

Youth career
- ?–2003: Romulea
- Crotone

Senior career*
Years	Team	Apps	(Gls)
2007–2010	Crotone	0	(0)
2007–2009	→ Siracusa (loan)	49	(0)
2010	→ Siracusa (loan)	4	(0)
2010–2012	Siracusa	10	(0)
Total		63	(0)
- * Club domestic league appearances and goals as of 30 June 2012

Massimo Fornoni (born 3 February 1989) is an Italian footballer.

== Club career ==
Born on 3 February 1989, in Rome, Fornoni started his career with a small Roman club, Romulea. He was released in 2003.

=== Crotone and loan to Siracusa ===
He was then signed by Crotone and played in its under-20 team until the 2006–07 season.

He then spent 2 seasons in Serie D for Siracusa. He won the 2008–09 Serie D Group I and finished as the runner-up in the grand final Scudetto Dilettanti. He returned to F.C. Crotone for the 2009–10 Serie B, as a backup for Emanuele Concetti and Simone Farelli.

=== Siracusa ===
In January 2010, he returned to Sicily on a temporary deal. Fornoni was the first choice ahead of Domenico Cecere. However, he was replaced by Antonio Castelli after 3 games. Castelli played 7 games ahead of Fornoni since round 27 and Fornoni was only able to play the last round (round 34). Siracusa finished sixth in Group C of the 2009–10 Lega Pro Seconda Divisione. At the start of season, Siracusa was invited to play in the 2010–11 Lega Pro Prima Divisione (third division) to fill the vacancies. Since the 2010–11 season, he was the backup of Paolo Baiocco. Siracusa signed Fornoni on a co-ownership deal that season. In June 2011, Crotone gave up the remaining 50% registration rights to Siracusa.

== Honours ==
Runner-up

- Serie D (Scudetto Dilettanti): 2009 (Siracusa)
  - Serie D Group I Champion: 2009 (Siracusa)
