= Amedeo Benedetti (footballer) =

Italian footballer (born 1991)

Personal information
- Date of birth: 25 October 1991 (age 35)
- Place of birth: Rovereto, Italy
- Height: 1.70 m (5 ft 7 in)
- Position: Left-back

Team information
- Current team: Pro Patria

Youth career
- Chievo

Senior career*
Years	Team	Apps	(Gls)
2010–2011	Vicenza	0	(0)
2010–2011	→ Pro Patria (loan)	27	(1)
2011–2017	Chievo	0	(0)
2011–2012	→ Pisa (loan)	27	(0)
2012–2013	→ Pisa (loan)	25	(1)
2013–2014	→ Lumezzane (loan)	25	(1)
2014–2015	→ Lumezzane (loan)	21	(1)
2015	→ Reggina (loan)	13	(0)
2015–2016	→ Cittadella (loan)	22	(0)
2016–2017	→ Cittadella (loan)	23	(1)
2017–2022	Cittadella	125	(3)
2022–2023	Pordenone	30	(0)
2023–2024	Benevento	17	(0)
2024–2026	Trapani	53	(1)
2026–	Pro Patria	0	(0)
- * Club domestic league appearances and goals as of 1 May 2026

Amedeo Benedetti (born 25 October 1991) is an Italian professional footballer who plays as a left-back for Serie D club Pro Patria.

== Biography ==
=== Chievo–Vicenza swap and loans ===
Benedetti started his career at Serie A club Chievo.

On 24 June 2010, 5 days before the closure of 2009–10 financial year of Chievo and Vicenza Calcio, Benedetti was swapped with Mattia Minesso. Both players were valued €2 million, thus no cash involved. Both club also retained 50% registration rights for €1M as part of co-ownership deal. Benedetti signed a 4-year contract. The deal made both club had an immediately selling profit on both players, a speculative future re-sell revenue and/or speculative players performance and a heavy cost in the future as amortization. (Note: As Benedetti signed 4-year contract, he would cost Vicenza €500,000 a year to amortizate the transfer fee. On "profit" side, the deal created an intangible asset of €2M nominal accounting value (the player contract). On 30 June 2010, Chievo shareholder equity stood at €687,180, thus no need to recapitalisation (The club did re-capitalised for €250,000 in 2010–11 financial year) and fulfill the benchmark such as value of production. However in the asset also included Daniele Rosania "worth" €1 million. Vicenza also had a positive net equity of €5,171,680 (based on book value of the asset, not real market value) on 30 June 2010 and without equity contribution in 2010–11 season.)

Both players were loaned to Lega Pro clubs. Benedetti joined Pro Patria of the second division of Lega Pro (ex-Serie C) in July 2010. Benedetti was the starting defender of Pro Patria with 27 league appearances.

=== Chievo return, loans ===
In June 2011, both players returned to their mother clubs with the same price (€1M for 50% rights), made that financial year in fact no amortization expense of €500,000 to deteriorate the situation but in the future did. That month, Chievo also swapped with other clubs as a trick to "fix" the financial situation. (Note: Benedetti's €2M profit in 2009–10 financial year would eventually fully offset by amortization in installments. Chievo swapped with Bologna in June 2011. Chievo got Alessandro Bassoli in exchange for Cesare Rickler. After the deals, on 30 June 2011, Chievo had shareholders' equity of €679,516 and player assets of €20,156,304, again no need to re-capitalization. However, Benedetti already "worth" €2 million while A.Bassoli "worth" €3 million, plus Filippo Tanaglia for €1 million. On Vicenza side, the about €5 million equity was composited with players which loaned out: Minesso (€2M), Simone Tonelli (€1.2M), Luca Righini (€675,000) and Andrea Mandorlini (€600,000), as well as flopped Denis Tonucci.)

Chievo failed to find a new buyer for Benedetti or may led to immediate negative financial impact. (Note: Chievo found a buyer for flopped Nicolò Brighenti in 2011 but Chievo had to write-down €506,695 for his inflated previous accounting value in 2010–11 accounts) and Chievo chose to amortize the €2M in installments in the lifespan of his contract, despite it was impaired with the benefit (income or performance) generated by the player. Since 2011, Benedetti had spent 6 seasons on loan from Chievo.

==== Pisa (loan) ====
Benedetti spent his 2011–12 season at Lega Pro Prima Divisione club Pisa.

Benedetti was the starting left-back (wing-back) of Pisa in 4–4–2 or 3–5–2 formation.

In July 2012 the loan was renewed.

==== Lumezzane (loan) ====
On 9 July 2013 he was signed by Lumezzane. The loan was renewed again on 17 July 2014.

==== Reggina (loan) ====
On 2 February 2015 he was signed by Reggina along with Chievo team-mate Kevin Magri.

==== Cittadella (loans) ====
On 24 July 2015 Benedetti, Yusupha Bobb and Lamin Jallow were signed by A.S. Cittadella in temporary deals. On 5 July 2016 the loan was renewed.

=== Cittadella ===
In summer 2017 he joined Cittadella in a definitive deal.

=== Pordenone ===
On 22 July 2022, Benedetti moved to Pordenone on a two-year deal.

=== Benevento ===
On 17 July 2023, Benedetti joined Benevento.
