= Dennis Esposito =

Italian footballer (born 1988)

Personal information
- Date of birth: 25 January 1988 (age 38)
- Place of birth: Milan, Italy
- Height: 1.84 m (6 ft 0 in)
- Position: Central defender

Youth career
- Pro Sesto
- 2001–2008: Internazionale

Senior career*
Years	Team	Apps	(Gls)
2008–2012	Internazionale	0	(0)
2008–2009	→ Reggiana (loan)	12	(0)
2009–2010	→ Monza (loan)	26	(0)
2010–2011	→ Monza (co-ownership)	3	(0)
2011–2012	→ Lecco (loan)	3	(0)

International career
2003	Italy U-16	5	(0)
- * Club domestic league appearances and goals as of 28 July 2011

Dennis Esposito (born 25 January 1988) is an Italian footballer, who plays as a defender.

== Career ==
Born in Milan, Lombardy, Esposito spent most of his youth career at Internazionale. He was signed by Inter at age 13 from Pro Sesto.

In July 2008, he was loaned to Reggiana, and in the next season, he left for Monza. In summer 2010, Monza signed him in co-ownership deal for a peppercorn fee, and in June 2011, Inter bought him back. In August, he left for Lecco, rejoining former Inter and Monza team-mate Domenico Maiese. On 31 January 2012, the loan was pre-matured.
