= Matteo D'Alessandro =

Italian footballer (born 1989)

Personal information
- Date of birth: 18 May 1989 (age 37)
- Place of birth: Sondrio, Italy
- Height: 1.79 m (5 ft 10 in)
- Position: Defender

Team information
- Current team: Atletico Ascoli

Youth career
- –2006: Como
- 2006–2009: Genoa

Senior career*
Years	Team	Apps	(Gls)
2009–2011	Reggiana	48	(0)
2011–2013	Reggina	45	(1)
2013–2014	Cuneo	14	(0)
2014–2015	Monza	9	(0)
2015	Pro Vercelli	1	(0)
2015–2016	Pro Patria	13	(1)
2016–2017	San Marco Juventina		
2017	Lumezzane	3	(0)
2018	Abano	12	(0)
2018	Vastese	14	(0)
2018–2019	Torres	19	(1)
2019–2020	Piccardo Traversetolo		
2020–2023	Porto d'Ascoli	59	(4)
2023–	Atletico Ascoli	5	(0)
- * Club domestic league appearances and goals as of 8 October 2023

Matteo D'Alessandro (born 18 May 1989) is an Italian professional footballer who plays for Serie D club Atletico Ascoli.

== Career ==
Born in Sondrio, Lombardy, D'Alessandro started his career at Calcio Como. On 31 August 2006 he was signed by Genoa C.F.C. In 2009, he was signed by Reggiana in temporary deal. In July 2010, the loan was extended to another season. On 31 January 2011, Reggiana bought him in co-ownership deal for a peppercorn of €500. On 31 August 2011 Reggina bought D'Alessandro from Reggiana for €100,000, with Genoa retained 50% registration rights. In June 2013 Genoa gave up the remain 50% registration rights to Reggina.

On 2 September 2013 D'Alessandro left for Lega Pro Seconda Divisione club Cuneo.

After the club relegated, he joined Lega Pro club Monza in June 2014. In January 2015 he joined Serie B club Pro Vercelli as a free agent. He took no.2 shirt from Andrea Marconi.

On 10 December 2015 he was signed by Pro Patria.

On 14 January 2017 D'Alessandro joined Lumezzane. In August 2019, D'Alessandro signed with Piccardo Traversetolo ASD.
