= Luca Cognigni =

Italian football player

Personal information
- Date of birth: 23 March 1991 (age 35)
- Place of birth: Ancona, Italy
- Height: 1.86 m (6 ft 1 in)
- Position: Forward

Team information
- Current team: Trodica
- Number: 9

Youth career
- –2010: Ascoli

Senior career*
Years	Team	Apps	(Gls)
2010	Ascoli	1	(0)
2010–2011	Mezzocorona	28	(3)
2012	Paganese	8	(0)
2012–2013	Tolentino	28	(17)
2013–2014	Matelica	23	(14)
2014–2015	Carpi	0	(0)
2014–2015	→ Ancona (loan)	27	(4)
2015–2017	Ancona	30	(8)
2017–2022	Fermana	108	(14)
2019	→ Siracusa (loan)	11	(0)
2022	Legnago	8	(0)
2022–2023	Forlì	9	(2)
2023–2024	Giulianova	??	(20)
2024–2025	Maceratese	25	(16)
2025–	Trodica	0	(0)
- * Club domestic league appearances and goals as of 1 July 2025

Luca Cognigni (born 23 March 1991) is an Italian footballer who plays as a forward for Trodica.

== Club career ==
He made his Serie B debut for Ascoli on 7 November 2009 in a game against Cittadella.

On 7 June 2018, Fermana announced that Cognigni had signed a new contract, keeping him at the club until 2020. On 17 January 2019, he joined Siracusa on loan.

On 26 July 2022, Cognigni moved to Legnago in Serie D.
