= Alessandro Bassoli =

Italian footballer (born 1990)

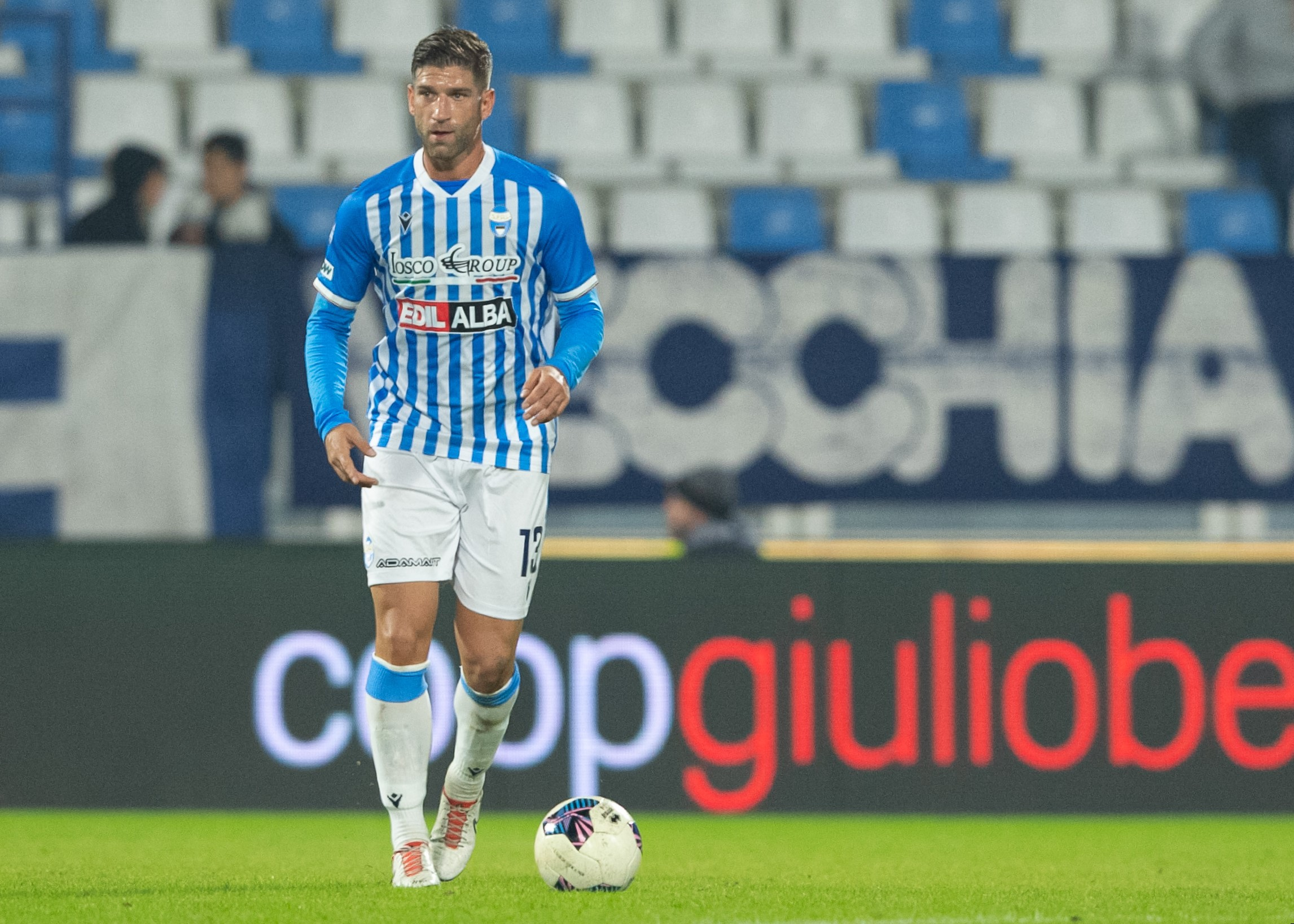

Personal information
- Date of birth: 19 June 1990 (age 36)
- Place of birth: Bologna, Italy
- Height: 1.78 m (5 ft 10 in)
- Position: Defender

Team information
- Current team: Picerno
- Number: 26

Youth career
- Bologna

Senior career*
| Years | Team | Apps | (Gls) |
| 2010–2011 | Bologna | 1 | (0) |
| 2010–2011 | → Foligno (loan) | 34 | (1) |
| 2011–2017 | Chievo | 0 | (0) |
| 2011–2012 | → Modena (loan) | 14 | (0) |
| 2012–2014 | → Südtirol (loan) | 52 | (5) |
| 2014–2015 | → Cremonese (loan) | 13 | (1) |
| 2015–2017 | → Südtirol (loan) | 69 | (2) |
| 2017–2023 | Pordenone | 121 | (2) |
| 2023–2024 | SPAL | 34 | (1) |
| 2025 | Rimini | 0 | (0) |
| 2025– | Picerno | 18 | (0) |
- * Club domestic league appearances and goals as of 1 May 2026

Alessandro Bassoli (born 19 June 1990) is an Italian professional footballer who plays as a defender for Serie C Group C club Picerno.

He made his Serie A debut for Bologna on 16 May 2010, in a game against Cagliari, when he came on as a substitute in the 78th minute for Adaílton.

He is the twin brother of Giacomo Bassoli.

== Chievo and controversy ==
In June 2011, a few days before the closure of the 2010–11 financial year of Bologna and A.C. ChievoVerona, Bassoli was exchanged with Cesare Rickler. Both clubs retained 50% registration rights (a co-ownership). They were valued €3 million, thus half of the rights worth €1.5 million. The press was criticized that it was purely a financial trick. The sale gave Bologna a player selling profit of €2,971,242, but also incurred a cost of €3 million (which would amortize in 5 years: €0.6 million per season) and VAT of €600,000. However, in accounting the amortization only started in 2011–12 season, made 2010–11 result (equity & net loss) "improved" by borrowing the money from the future and partly from the real value of the players. (In fact Bologna also did the trick with other clubs) Both Rickler and Bassoli failed to play for the first team for his new club, which the club merely benefited in the field currently and only had a speculative re-sale profit on both players, as both players had a few appearances in Serie A.

Bassoli spent 2011–12 Serie B with Modena F.C. He made 6 starts. He wore no.3 shirt. In June 2012, due to Rickler's involvement in 2011–12 Italian football scandal, both mother club gave up the remain registration rights. (However no effect in accounting).

Bassoli had a price-tag of €2.4 million in accounting on 30 June 2012 but failed to play for Chievo first team nor loaned out, until a last day transfer to third division club South Tyrol on 31 August 2012, the loan was renewed on 11 July 2013 and Chievo had to book another €600,000 amortization cost in 2013–14 season.

On 25 July 2014 Bassoli was signed by Cremonese. On 6 July 2015 Bassoli re-joined South Tyrol again.
