= Federico Moretti =

Italian footballer

Personal information
- Date of birth: 28 October 1988 (age 38)
- Place of birth: Genoa, Italy
- Height: 1.83 m (6 ft 0 in)
- Position: Midfielder

Team information
- Current team: Busalla Calcio

Youth career
- 1995–2005: Sampdoria
- 2005–2006: Parma

Senior career*
| Years | Team | Apps | (Gls) |
| 2006–2008 | Parma | 1 | (0) |
| 2008–2009 | Varese | 8 | (0) |
| 2009–2010 | Catania | 2 | (0) |
| 2010–2011 | Ascoli | 37 | (4) |
| 2011–2015 | Catania | 0 | (0) |
| 2012 | → Grosseto (loan) | 13 | (0) |
| 2012–2013 | → Modena (loan) | 33 | (1) |
| 2013–2014 | → Spezia (loan) | 11 | (0) |
| 2014 | → Padova (loan) | 16 | (1) |
| 2014–2015 | → Vicenza (loan) | 36 | (7) |
| 2015–2017 | Latina | 19 | (0) |
| 2016 | → Vicenza (loan) | 21 | (0) |
| 2017–2018 | Avellino | 33 | (2) |
| 2019 | Albissola | 11 | (1) |
| 2019 | Honvéd | 1 | (0) |
| 2019– | Busalla Calcio | 1 | (0) |

International career
| 2004–2005 | Italy U-16 | 6 | (1) |
| 2005–2006 | Italy U-17 | 12 | (2) |
| 2006–2007 | Italy U-18 | 11 | (1) |
| 2007–2009 | Italy U-20 | 7 | (0) |
| 2009 | Italy U-21 | 0 | (0) |
- * Club domestic league appearances and goals as of 31 August 2019

Federico Moretti (born 28 October 1988) is an Italian footballer who plays for Busalla Calcio.

== Club career ==
=== Early career ===
Born in Genoa, Italy, Moretti began his youth career within the youth academy of local side, U.C. Sampdoria. He remained at the blucerchiati until 2005, when he transferred to Parma F.C.

=== Parma F.C. ===
Moretti began his Primavera (under-20) youth career with Parma F.C. in 2005. He remained in the youth team until 2008, but had begun to earn first team call-ups in 2006. Moretti made his first appearance for Parma on 29 November 2006, against RC Lens, in a UEFA Cup match as a starter. His Serie A debut came on 18 May 2008, in a 0–2 home loss to Inter Milan on the final matchday of the 2007–08 Serie A campaign.

=== A.S. Varese ===
In the summer of 2008, Moretti was transferred to A.S. Varese 1910 in co-ownership deal with Parma. During his first full professional season, Moretti made 8 appearances in the Italian Lega Pro Prima Divisione. Following the 2008–09 season with Varese, Moretti was sold outright to Calcio Catania, in a return to the Serie A.

=== Calcio Catania ===
On 11 July 2009, it was confirmed that Moretti had signed for Catania. He made his debut for the club on 23 January 2010, and spent the entire season training with the first team, though he only made 4 appearances in all competitions, and also spent time playing within the club's youth squad, in order to obtain regular playing time. On 25 June 2010 the 22-year-old midfielder left Catania and joined Italian Serie B side Ascoli Calcio in co-ownership deal. After an impressive season with Ascoli, in which the midfielder held down a starting position, making 37 league appearances and also scoring 4 league goals, Moretti was signed back permanently by Catania in June 2011, but was again sent on loan to U.S. Grosseto F.C. shortly after on a season long loan deal for the 2011–12 Serie B campaign. Moretti began his season brightly, making 12 appearances during the andata (first half of the season), eight as a starter. His season was cut drastically short, however, after a serious injury on 17 December 2011 in a 2–2 draw with Empoli. He made a return to action on the final matchday of the Serie B campaign that year as a 75th-minute substitute before returning to Catania the following month.

On 31 August 2012, Moretti was sent out on another season-long loan deal to Serie B side, Modena F.C. He made 33 league appearances for the club and was a mainstay in the outfit's starting lineup for much of the 2012–13 Serie B. Following the expiration of the loan, he returned to Catania once again on 30 June 2013, before being loaned to Spezia Calcio ahead of the 2013–14 Serie B campaign.

On 15 September 2014 he was signed by Vicenza Calcio in another temporary deal.

=== Albissola ===
On 2 February 2019, he signed with Serie C club Albissola.

=== Budapest Honvéd ===
On 24 July 2019, he was signed to Hungary with the Europa League qualifier Budapest Honvéd. On 31 August 2019, he was released from the club.

=== Busalla ===
On 4 September 2019, Moretti joined Busalla Calcio.

== Career statistics ==
As of match played on 27 February 2018

Appearances and goals by club, season and competition
| Club | Season | League | | | Cup | | Other | | Total | |
| Club | Season | Division | Apps | Goals | Apps | Goals | Apps | Goals | Apps | Goals |
|---|---|---|---|---|---|---|---|---|---|---|
| Parma | 2006–07 | Serie A | 0 | 0 | 0 | 0 | 0 | 0 | 0 | 0 |
| Parma | 2007–08 | Serie A | 1 | 0 | 0 | 0 | 0 | 0 | 1 | 0 |
| Parma | Total | | 1 | 0 | 0 | 0 | 0 | 0 | 1 | 0 |
| Catania | 2009–10 | Serie A | 2 | 0 | 3 | 1 | 0 | 0 | 5 | 1 |
| Ascoli | 2010–11 | Serie B | 37 | 4 | 1 | 0 | 0 | 0 | 38 | 4 |
| Catania | 2011–12 | Serie A | 0 | 0 | 1 | 0 | 0 | 0 | 1 | 0 |
| Grosseto (loan) | 2011–12 | Serie B | 13 | 0 | 0 | 0 | 0 | 0 | 13 | 0 |
| Modena (loan) | 2012–13 | Serie B | 33 | 1 | 0 | 0 | 0 | 0 | 33 | 1 |
| Spezia (loan) | 2013–14 | Serie B | 11 | 0 | 1 | 0 | 0 | 0 | 12 | 0 |
| Padova (loan) | 2013–14 | Serie B | 16 | 1 | 0 | 0 | 0 | 0 | 16 | 1 |
| Vicenza (loan) | 2014–15 | Serie B | 36 | 7 | 0 | 0 | 0 | 0 | 36 | 7 |
| Latina | 2015–16 | Serie B | 15 | 0 | 0 | 0 | 0 | 0 | 15 | 0 |
| Latina | 2016–17 | Serie B | 4 | 0 | 2 | 0 | 0 | 0 | 6 | 0 |
| Latina | Total | | 19 | 0 | 2 | 0 | 0 | 0 | 21 | 0 |
| Vicenza (loan) | 2015–16 | Serie B | 21 | 0 | 0 | 0 | 0 | 0 | 21 | 0 |
| Avellino | 2016–17 | Serie B | 17 | 1 | 0 | 0 | 0 | 0 | 17 | 1 |
| Avellino | 2017–18 | Serie B | 12 | 1 | 2 | 0 | 0 | 0 | 14 | 1 |
| Avellino | Total | | 29 | 2 | 2 | 0 | 0 | 0 | 31 | 2 |
| Career totals | | | 218 | 15 | 10 | 1 | 0 | 0 | 228 | 16 |

== International career ==
Moretti has also been called up on several occasions to the Italy U-16, Italy U-17, Italy U-18, Italy U-20, and Italy U-21 national teams.
