= 2013–14 FBC Unione Venezia season =

F.B.C. Unione Venezia
2013–14 season
- Chairman: Yuri Korablin
- Head Coach: Alessandro Dal Canto
- Stadium: Stadio Pier Luigi Penzo, Venice, Italy
- Lega Pro 1D: 10th
- Coppa Italia: 1st round
- Coppa Italia Lega Pro: 1st round
- Top goalscorer: Riccardo Bocalon (15)
Home colours	Away colours

The 2013–14 season of F.B.C. Unione Venezia was their first season in Lega Pro Prima Divisione after promotion from the Seconda Divisione in 2012–13.

== Players ==
=== Transfers ===
==== In ====
—	DF	ITA	Emanuele Panzeri (from Novara)
—	FW	ITA	Francesco Margiotta (from Juventus, on loan)
—	MF	ITA	Salvatore Gallo (from Chievo)
—	GK	ITA	Mauro Vigorito (from Cagliari)
—	MF	ITA	Daniele Giorico (from Cagliari, on loan)
—	FW	FRA	Ousmane Dramé (from Padova, on loan)
—	FW	ITA	Riccardo Bocalon (from Inter)
—	MF	ITA	Alberto Pignat (from Portogruaro-Summaga)
—	DF	ITA	Nicola Pasini (from Genoa, on loan)
—	MF	ITA	Matteo Calamai (from Viareggio)
—	GK	ITA	Renato Dossena (from Empoli)
—	GK	ITA	Stefano Fortunato (from Vicenza)
—	DF	ITA	Francesco Cernuto (from Reggina, on loan)
—	DF	ITA	Vito Di Bari (from Reggina)
—	DF	ITA	Nicola Lancini (from Brescia, on loan)
—	MF	SUI	Alessandro Martinelli (from Sampdoria, on loan)

==== Out ====
—	DF	ITA	Marco Cabeccia (to Torres)
—	GK	ITA	Giovanni Zandrini (to Reggina)
—	FW	ITA	Denis Godeas (Released)
—	FW	ITA	Fabio Lauria (Released)
—	MF	ITA	Nicola Princivalli (Released)
—	GK	ITA	Andrea Menegon (Released)
—	MF	ITA	Eduardo Carloto (Released)
—	DF	ITA	Claudio Miale (Released)
—	GK	ITA	Francesco Bonato (to Chievo, end of loan)
—	DF	ITA	Federico Masi (to Bari, end of loan)
—	MF	ITA	Simone Tonelli (to Vicenza, end of loan)
—	MF	ITA	Salvatore Margarita (to Ascoli, end of loan)
—	DF	ITA	Salvatore D'Elia (to Vicenza, end of loan)
—	MF	ITA	Andrea Marconi (to Pro Vercelli, end of loan)
—	DF	BRA	Jefferson Alves Oliveira (to Udinese, end of loan)
—	FW	ITA	Riccardo Bocalon (to Inter, end of loan)
—	MF	ITA	Giacomo Cenetti (to Carpi, end of loan)
—	FW	ITA	Michele Marconi (to Alessandria)

=== Squad ===
Note: Flags indicate national team as defined under FIFA eligibility rules; some limited exceptions apply. Players may hold more than one non-FIFA nationality.

No.	Pos.	Nation	Player
—	GK	ITA	Renato Dossena
—	GK	ITA	Stefano Fortunato
—	GK	ITA	Mauro Vigorito
—	DF	ITA	Davide Bertolucci
—	DF	ITA	Dario Campagna
—	DF	ITA	Francesco Cernuto (on loan from Reggina)
—	DF	ITA	Vito Di Bari
—	DF	ITA	Nicola Lancini (on loan from Brescia)
—	DF	ITA	Emanuele Panzeri
—	DF	ITA	Nicola Pasini (on loan from Genoa)
—	DF	ITA	Marco Pisano
—	DF	URU	Cristian Sosa
—	MF	ITA	Matteo Calamai (on loan from Viareggio)

No.	Pos.	Nation	Player
—	MF	ITA	Nicola Capellini
—	MF	ITA	Davide Carcuro
—	MF	ITA	Salvatore Gallo
—	MF	ITA	Daniele Giorico (on loan from Cagliari)
—	MF	ITA	Federico Maracchi
—	MF	SUI	Alessandro Martinelli (on loan from Sampdoria)
—	FW	ITA	Riccardo Bocalon
—	FW	ITA	Sacha Cori (on loan from Cesena)
—	FW	ITA	Davide D'Appolonia
—	FW	BUL	Radoslav Kirilov (on loan from Chievo)
—	FW	ITA	Raffaele Franchini
—	FW	ITA	Francesco Margiotta (on loan from Juventus)

== Staff ==
Head coach

- (Italy) Alessandro Dal Canto

Assistant coach

- (Italy) Marco Zanchi

Fitness coach

- (Italy) Fabio Munzone

Goalkeeper coach

- (Italy) Giorgio Sterchele

== Profiles and statistics ==
Role	Player	Born	Apps	Goals	Apps	Goals	Apps	Goals	Apps	Goals
Role	Player	Born	Lega Pro 1D		Coppa Italia		Coppa Italia Lega Pro		Total	
Goalkeepers
GK	(Italy) Andrea Vigorito	1990	21	-26	1	-2	0	0	22	-30
GK	(Italy) Renato Dossena	1987	0	0	0	0	1	-3	1	-3
GK	(Italy) Stefano Fortunato	1990	1	-1	0	0	1	0	2	-1
Defenders
DF	(Italy) Francesco Battaglia	1985	0	0	1	0	1	0	2	0
DF	(Italy) Davide Bertolucci	1988	19	0	1	0	0	0	20	0
DF	(Italy) Dario Campagna	1988	17	0	1	0	0	0	18	0
DF	(Italy) Francesco Cernuto	1992	1	0	0	0	2	0	3	0
DF	(Italy) Vito Di Bari	1983	19	1	0	0	0	0	19	1
DF	(Italy) Gianluca Giovannini	1983	3	0	1	0	0	0	4	0
DF	(Italy) Nicola Lancini	1994	6	1	0	0	2	0	8	1
DF	(Italy) Emanuele Panzeri	1993	2	0	0	0	2	0	4	0
DF	(Italy) Nicola Pasini	1991	22	0	0	0	0	0	22	0
DF	(Italy) Marco Pisano	1981	0	0	0	0	0	0	0	0
DF	(Uruguay) Cristian Sosa	1985	6	0	0	0	0	0	6	0
Midfielders
MF	(Italy) Matteo Calamai	1991	19	1	0	0	1	0	20	1
MF	(Italy) Nicola Capellini	1991	5	0	0	0	0	0	5	0
MF	(Italy) Davide Carcuro	1987	4	0	0	0	0	0	4	0
MF	(Italy) Sebastiano Da Lio	1994	0	0	0	0	0	0	0	0
MF	(Italy) Salvatore Gallo	1992	18	0	0	0	1	0	19	0
MF	(Italy) Daniele Giorico	1992	20	1	1	0	1	0	22	1
MF	(Italy) Federico Maracchi	1988	17	2	1	0	1	0	19	2
MF	(Switzerland) Alessandro Martinelli	1993	16	1	0	0	1	0	17	1
MF	(Italy) Alberto Pignat	1994	4	0	1	0	1	0	6	0
MF	(Italy) Max Taddei	1991	2	0	1	0	1	0	4	0
Forwards
FW	(Italy) Riccardo Bocalon	1989	21	12	1	1	1	0	23	13
FW	(Italy) Sacha Cori	1989	20	6	0	0	1	0	21	6
FW	(Italy) Davide D'Appolonia	1993	7	0	1	1	2	0	10	1
FW	(France) Ousmane Drame	1992	5	0	1	0	2	1	7	1
FW	(Italy) Raffaele Franchini	1984	8	0	1	0	0	0	9	0
FW	(Bulgaria) Radoslav Kirilov	1992	3	1	0	0	0	0	3	1
FW	(Italy) Francesco Margiotta	1993	12	4	0	0	0	0	12	4
FW	(Italy) Alberto Pescara	1995	1	1	0	0	0	0	1	1
FW	(Italy) Nicholas Siega	1996	0	0	0	0	1	0	1	0

Legend:

- Footballers who left the team after the beginning of the season.

== Matches ==
=== Lega Pro Prima Divisione ===
1 September 2013 1	FeralpiSalò	2–0	Venezia	Salò
	Miracoli 28'; Marsura 42'	Report		Stadium: Lino Turina; Referee: Niccolò Pagliardini (Arezzo)

8 September 2013 2	Venezia	5–3	Lumezzane	Portogruaro
	Maracchi 47'; Giorico 49'; Cori 65'; Calamai 86'	Report	2', 82' Torregrossa; 45' Mauro Belotti	Stadium: Stadio Pier Giovanni Mecchia; Referee: Riccardo Ros (Pordenone)

15 September 2013 3	Virtus Entella	2–1	Venezia	Chiavari
	Di Tacchio 9'; Guerra 67'	Report	24' Maracchi	Stadium: Comunale; Referee: Antonio Rapuano (Rimini)

21 September 2013 4	Venezia	2–1	Vicenza	Portogruaro
	Cori 70'; Bocalon 81'	Report	58' Giacomelli	Stadium: Stadio Pier Giovanni Mecchia; Referee: Stefano D’Angelo (Ascoli Piceno)

6 October 2013 5	Pavia	0–1	Venezia	Pavia
		Report	5' Cori	Stadium: Pietro Fortunati; Referee: Fabio Piscopo (Imperia)

13 October 2013 6	Venezia	1–1	Südtirol	Portogruaro
	Cori 6' (pen.)	Report	39' Ekuban	Stadium: Stadio Pier Giovanni Mecchia; Referee: Luca Albertini (Ascoli Piceno)

20 October 2013 7	Carrarese	0–1	Venezia	Carrara
	Bregliano (yellow card); Belcastro (yellow card); Calvi (yellow card); Tognoni (yellow card)	Report	41' (pen.) Bocalon; (yellow card) Vigorito; (yellow card) di Bari	Stadium: Stadio dei Marmi; Referee: Daniele Martinelli (Rome)

27 October 2013 8	Pro Patria	1–0	Venezia	Busto Arsizio
	Serafini 81' (pen.); Messina (yellow card); Miganelli (yellow card)	Report	(yellow card) Vigorito; (yellow card) Giorico; (yellow card) Gallo; (yellow card) Drame	Stadium: Stadio Carlo Speroni; Referee: Gianluca Ceccarelli (Rimini)

3 November 2013 9	Venezia	2–1	Reggiana	Venice
	Cori 6'; Bocalon 90'; Calamai (yellow card); Gallo (yellow card)		16' De Silvestro (yellow card) Rampi	Stadium: Stadio Pier Luigi Penzo; Referee: Marco Serra (Turin)

17 November 2013 10	Savona	2–1	Venezia	Savona
	Virdis 53' (pen.), 76' (pen.); Maccarone (yellow card); Cattaneo (yellow card)	Report	90' Pescara; (yellow card) Giorico; (yellow card) Bocalon	Stadium: Valerio Bacigalupo; Referee: Andrea Tardino (Siena)

24 November 2013 11	Venezia	1–1	Pro Vercelli	Venice
	Bocalon 88'; Gallo (yellow card); Taddei (red card) 77'	Report	75' Horacio Erpen; (yellow card) Russo; (yellow card) Scavone; (yellow card) Marchi	Stadium: Stadio Pier Luigi Penzo; Referee: Juan Luca Sacchi (Macerata)

1 December 2013 12	Como	0–2	Venezia	Como
	Redolfi 37'; Defendi 38'; Refolfi (yellow card)	Report	(yellow card) Cori; (yellow card) Giorico; (yellow card) Giovannini	Stadium: Giuseppe Sinigaglia; Referee: Andrea Morreale (Rome)

8 December 2013 13	Venezia	2–1	San Marino	Venice
	Bocalon 19', 83' (pen.); Campagna (yellow card)	Report	56' Draghetti; (yellow card) Cicarevic; (yellow card) Farina; (yellow card) Guarco; (yellow card) Magnanelli	Stadium: Stadio Pier Luigi Penzo; Referee: Paolo Formato (Benevento)

15 December 2013 14	Cremonese	1–3	Venezia	Cremona
	Margiotta 9'; Bocalon 29', 50'; Di Bari (yellow card); Gallo (yellow card); Panzeri (yellow card); Pignat (yellow card)	Report	28' Brighenti; (yellow card) Bergamelli; (yellow card) Bremec; (yellow card) Brighenti	Stadium: Giovanni Zini; Referee: Gianluca Ceccarelli (Rimini)

22 December 2013 15	Venezia	1–0	AlbinoLeffe	Venice
	Margiotta 9'	Report	(yellow card) Pontiggia	Stadium: Stadio Pier Luigi Penzo; Referee: Luca Albertini (Ascoli Piceno)

5 January 2014 16	Venezia	0–1	FeralpiSalò	Venice
		Report	45' Magli; (yellow card) Pinardi; (yellow card) Cittadino; (yellow card) Bracaletti; (yellow card) Ceccarelli	Stadium: Stadio Pier Luigi Penzo; Referee: Manuel Verdenelli (Foligno)

12 January 2014 17	Lumezzane	1–2	Venezia	Lumezzane
	Torregrossa 88' (yellow card) Belotti; (yellow card) Monticone	Report	73' Bocalon; 90' Lancini; (yellow card) Gallo	Stadium: Nuovo Comunale; Referee: Vincenzo Ripa (Nocera Inferiore)

19 January 2014 18	Venezia	0–2	Virtus Entella	Venice
	Martinelli (yellow card)	Report	13' Marchi; 66' Moreo; (yellow card) Cecchini; (yellow card) Russo; (yellow card) Troiano; (yellow card) Volpe	Stadium: Stadio Pier Luigi Penzo; Referee: Marco Piccinini (Forlì).

26 January 2014 19	Vicenza	2–1	Venezia	Vicenza
14:30	Jadid 80'; Maritato 81'; Castiglia (yellow card); El Hasni (yellow card); Murolo (red card) 63'	Report	49' Martinelli; (yellow card) Franchini	Stadium: Romeo Menti; Attendance: 6080; Referee: Claudio Lanza (Nichelino)

2 February 2014 20	Venezia	2–2	Pavia	Venice
14:30	Margiotta 16'; Bocalon 45'; Carcuro (yellow card); Giorico (yellow card); Margiotta (yellow card); Capellini (yellow card) 46' (yellow-red card)	Report	52' Ferri; 90' de Vita; (yellow card) Sorbo; (yellow card) D'Orso	Stadium: Stadio Pier Luigi Penzo; Attendance: 825; Referee: Valerio Colarossi (Rome)

9 February 2014 21	Südtirol	1–4	Venezia	Bolzano
14:30	Bastone 88'; Vasallo (red card) 42'	Report	Bocalon 19', 35'; Kirilov 42' (pen.); Margiotta 66'; Carcuro (yellow card); Pasini (yellow card)	Stadium: Druso; Referee: Paolo Formato (Benevento)

23 February 2014 22	Venezia	1–2	Carrarese	Venice
14:30	Cori 71'; Pasini (yellow card) di Bari (yellow card); Gallo (yellow card); Sosa (yellow card)	Report	60' Dettori; 63' Cellini; (yellow card) Dettori; (yellow card) Cellini; (yellow card) Bregliano; (yellow card) Castagnetti; (yellow card) Gherardi	Stadium: Stadio Pier Luigi Penzo; Referee: Antonio Eros Lacagnina (Caltanissetta)

2 March 2014 23	Venezia	3–0	Pro Patria	Venice
14:30	Bocalon 13', 73', 84'; Campagna (yellow card); Carcuro (yellow card)	Report	(yellow card) Calzi; (yellow card) Siega; (red card) 78' Serafini	Stadium: Stadio Pier Luigi Penzo; Attendance: 1003; Referee: Andrea Tardino (Milan)

9 March 2014 24	Reggiana	1–0	Venezia	Reggio Emilia
	Alessi 61' (pen.); De Giosa (yellow card); Possenti (yellow card); Solini (yellow card); Andre (yellow card); Alessi (yellow card); Ruopolo (yellow card); Fondi (yellow card)	Report	(yellow card) Di Bari; (red card) 59' Pasini; (yellow card) Lancini; (yellow card) Gallo	Stadium: Città del Tricolore; Attendance: 1790; Referee: Niccolò Pagliardini (Arezzo)

16 March 2014 25	Venezia	1–1	Savona	Venice
	Sosa 55'; Lancini (yellow card); Carcuro (yellow card); Bocalon (yellow card)	Report	40' Virdis; (yellow card) Quintavalla; (yellow card) Manuel Marras	Stadium: Stadio Pier Luigi Penzo; Referee: Salvatore Guarino (Caltanissetta)

23 March 2014 26	Pro Vercelli	1–0	Venezia	Vercelli
	Fabiano 39'; Scaglia (yellow card); Marconi (yellow card)		(yellow card) Campagna; (yellow card) Lancini; (yellow card) Martinelli; (yellow card) 72' (yellow-red card) Gallo; (red card) 83' Gallo	Stadium: Silvio Piola; Referee: Vincenzo Ripa (Nocera Inferiore)

6 April 2014 27	Venezia	2–2	Como	Venice
	Kirilov 22'; Bocalon 44' (pen.); Franchini (yellow card)	Report	14' Le Noci; 19' Schenetti; (yellow card) Fautario; (yellow card) Ardito; (yellow card) Verachi; (yellow card) Schenetti; (yellow card) Gammone	Stadium: Stadio Pier Luigi Penzo; Referee: Andrea Morreale (Rome)

13 April 2014 28	San Marino	2–1	Venezia	Serravalle
	Cicarevic 52'; Lolli 80'; Spirito (yellow card); Gabriele Pacciardi (yellow card); Guarco (yellow card) 90' (yellow-red card)	Report	91' Franchini	Stadium: Olimpico; Referee: Pietro Dei Giudici (Latina)

27 April 2014 29	Venezia	1–0	Cremonese	Venice
	di Bari 67'	Report	(yellow card) Loviso; (yellow card) Armellino; (yellow card) Casoli	Stadium: Stadio Pier Luigi Penzo; Referee: Daniele Martinelli (Rome)

4 May 2014 30	AlbinoLeffe	2–1	Venezia	Albino
	Allievi 41'; Beduschi 73'; Calvano (yellow card); Corradi (yellow card); Cissé (yellow card)	Report	93' Maracchi (yellow card) Cernuto; (yellow card) Carcuro; (red card) 30' Sosa	Stadium: Atleti Azzurri d'Italia; Referee: Giuseppe Cifelli (Campobasso)

=== Coppa Italia ===
3 August 2013 1st	Grosseto	2–2 (a.e.t.) (6–5 p)	Venezia	Grosseto
	Giovio 58'; Gioè 88'	Report	D'Appolonia 65'; Bocalon 76'	Stadium: Stadio Olimpico Carlo Zecchini; Referee: Claudio Lanza (Nichelino)
	Penalties
	Scappini (penalty scored); Calderoni (penalty scored); Colombi (penalty missed); Barba (penalty scored); Esposito (penalty scored); Som (penalty scored); Formiconi (penalty scored)		(penalty scored) Taddei; (penalty scored) Raffaele Franchini; (penalty missed) Marconi; (penalty scored) Battaglia; (penalty scored) Giorico; (penalty scored) Pignat; (penalty missed) Bertolucci

=== Coppa Italia Lega Pro ===
9 October 2013 1st Elimination	SPAL	0–1 (a.e.t.)	Venezia	Ferrara
		Report	Drame 103'	Stadium: Stadio Paolo Mazza; Referee: Stefano Giovani (Grosseto)

23 October 2013 2nd	Venezia	0–3	Cremonese	Portogruaro
	Lancini (yellow card)	Report	22' Bergamelli; 23', 35' Abbruscato; (yellow card) Armellino; (yellow card) Palumbo; (yellow card) Zieleniecki	Stadium: Stadio Pier Giovanni Mecchia; Referee: Matteo Proietti (Terni)

== Championship statistics ==
=== Results by round ===
Round	1	2	3	4	5	6	7	8	9	10	11	12	13	14	15	16	17	18	19	20	21	22	23	24	25	26	27	28	29	30
Ground	A	H	A	H	A	H	A	A	H	A	H	A	H	A	H	H	A	H	A	H	A	H	H	A	H	A	H	A	H	A
Result	L	W	L	W	W	D	W	L	W	L	D	L	W	W	W	L	W	L	L	D	W	L	W	L	D	L	D	L	W	L
Position	15	8	11	5	5	5	4	5	4	6	6			4	3	4	4	4	7	7	4	6	6	7						10

Updated to match(es) played on 14 October 2013. Source: bari91.com
A = Away; H = Home; W = Win; D = Draw; L = Loss

=== Results summary ===
Overall								Home						Away					
Pld	W	D	L	GF	GA	GD	Pts	W	D	L	GF	GA	GD	W	D	L	GF	GA	GD
20	8	3	9	28	26	+2	27	4	3	3	17	15	+2	4	0	6	11	11	0

Last updated: 14 October 2013.
