= Salvatore Gallo =

Salvatore Gallo may refer to:

- Salvatore Gallo (footballer) (born 1992), Italian footballer
- Salvatore Gallo (sculptor) (1928–1996), Italian sculptor
