= 2013–14 Lega Pro Prima Divisione =

Football season edition

Prima Divisione
- Season: 2013–14
- Champions: Virtus Entella (Girone A), Perugia (Girone B)
- Promoted: Pro Vercelli, Vicenza (Girone A), Frosinone (Girone B)

The 2013–14 Prima Divisione season is the thirty-sixth and final football league season of Italian Prima Divisione since its establishment in 1978, and the fifth since the renaming from Serie C to Lega Pro.

It is divided into two phases: the regular season, and the playoff phase. The league is composed of 33 teams divided into two divisions of 16 (Lega Pro Prima Divisione A) and 17 teams (Lega Pro Prima Divisione B).

Teams finishing first in the regular season, plus one team winning the playoff round from each division will be promoted to Serie B. No team will be relegated, as all non-promoted league participants will take part in the first season of the unified Lega Pro league in 2014–15.

There was only one repechage from Seconda Divisione by Carrarese to fill the vacant spot created after the failure of Tritium.

== Girone A ==
=== Teams ===
Teams from Emilia-Romagna, Liguria, Lombardy, Piedmont, San Marino, Trentino-Alto Adige/Südtirol, Tuscany & Veneto

Location of teams in Girone A 2013–14

Club	City	Stadium	Capacity	2012–13 season
AlbinoLeffe	Albino and Leffe (playing in Bergamo)	Atleti Azzurri d'Italia	26,542	6th in Lega Pro Prima Divisione A
Carrarese	Carrara	dei Marmi	9,500	16th in Lega Pro Prima Divisione B
Como	Como	Giuseppe Sinigaglia	13,602	12th in Lega Pro Prima Divisione A
Cremonese	Cremona	Giovanni Zini	20,641	7th in Lega Pro Prima Divisione A
FeralpiSalò	Salò and Lonato del Garda (playing in Salò)	Lino Turina	2,000	9th in Lega Pro Prima Divisione A
Lumezzane	Lumezzane	Tullio Saleri	4,150	8th in Lega Pro Prima Divisione A
Pavia	Pavia	Pietro Fortunati	4,999	11th in Lega Pro Prima Divisione A
Pro Patria	Busto Arsizio	Carlo Speroni	4,627	1st in Lega Pro Seconda Divisione A
Pro Vercelli	Vercelli	Silvio Piola	8,000	21st in the Serie B
Reggiana	Reggio Emilia	Città del Tricolore	20,084	15th in Lega Pro Prima Divisione A
San Marino	Serravalle	Olimpico	7,000	10th in Lega Pro Prima Divisione A
Savona	Savona	Valerio Bacigalupo	4,000	2nd in Lega Pro Seconda Divisione A
Südtirol	Bolzano	Druso	3,500	4th in Lega Pro Prima Divisione A
Venezia	Venezia	Pierluigi Penzo^{1}	7,450	3rd in Lega Pro Seconda Divisione A
Vicenza	Vicenza	Romeo Menti	12,200	19th in the Serie B
Virtus Entella	Chiavari	Comunale	4,154	5th in Lega Pro Prima Divisione A

^{1} Venezia played roughly the first half of the season in Stadio Piergiovanni Mecchia in Portogruaro.

=== League table ===
Pos	Team	Pld	W	D	L	GF	GA	GD	Pts	Qualification
1	Virtus Entella (P)	30	16	10	4	42	24	+18	58	Promotion to Serie B
2	Pro Vercelli (O, P)	30	14	15	1	34	16	+18	57	Promotion after play-off
3	Südtirol	30	14	7	9	45	38	+7	49	Promotion play-off
4	Cremonese	30	13	8	9	37	29	+8	47 (Note: VIC 0-0 CRE; CRE 2-1 VIC)	Promotion play-off
5	Vicenza (P)	30	14	9	7	44	31	+13	47 (Note: Vicenza was docked 4 points.) (Note: Vicenza were promoted administratively after the dissolution of A.C. Siena)	Promotion play-off
6	Savona	30	12	8	10	43	41	+2	44	Promotion play-off
7	AlbinoLeffe	30	12	7	11	42	40	+2	43	Promotion play-off
8	Como	30	10	12	8	37	32	+5	42	Promotion play-off
9	FeralpiSalò	30	11	8	11	41	42	−1	41 (Note: FER 2-0 VEN; VEN 0-1 FER)	Promotion play-off
10	Venezia	30	12	5	13	40	38	+2	41	
11	Carrarese	30	9	9	12	35	41	−6	36	
12	Reggiana	30	9	5	16	30	36	−6	32 (Note: PRO 0-1 REG; REG 0-1 PRO)	
13	Pro Patria	30	8	9	13	25	33	−8	32 (Note: Pro Patria was docked 1 point.)	
14	Lumezzane	30	7	8	15	31	42	−11	29	
15	San Marino	30	5	9	16	22	47	−25	24	
16	Pavia	30	4	11	15	23	41	−18	23	

Source: Lega Pro
Rules for classification: 1) points; 2) goal difference; 3) number of goals scored.
(O) Play-off winners; (P) Promoted

=== Play-off ===
Quarter-finals
4	Cremonese (pso)	2(6)	2(6)
7	AlbinoLeffe	2(5)	2(5)
3	Südtirol (pso)	0(4)	0(4)
8	Como	0(3)	0(3)
5	Vicenza	1(2)	1(2)
6	Savona (pso)	1(3)	1(3)
2	Pro Vercelli	3	3
9	FeralpiSalò	0	0

Semi-finals
4	Cremonese	1	1	2
3	Südtirol	1	2	3
6	Savona	1	1	2
2	Pro Vercelli	2	2	4

Final
3	Südtirol	0	1	1
2	Pro Vercelli	1	1	2

== Girone B ==
=== Teams ===
Teams from Abruzzo, Apulia, Calabria, Campania, Lazio, Marche, Tuscany & Umbria

Location of teams in Girone B 2013–14
Location of teams in Girone B 2013–14 (Campania)
Location of teams in Girone B 2013–14 (Tuscany)

Club	City	Stadium	Capacity	2012–13 season
Ascoli	Ascoli Piceno	Cino e Lillo Del Duca	20,550	20th in the Serie B
Barletta	Barletta	Cosimo Puttilli	4,018	14th in Lega Pro Prima Divisione B
Benevento	Benevento	Ciro Vigorito	12,847	6th in Lega Pro Prima Divisione B
Catanzaro	Catanzaro	Nicola Ceravolo	14,650	10th in Lega Pro Prima Divisione B
Frosinone	Frosinone	Matusa	9,680	7th in Lega Pro Prima Divisione B
Grosseto	Grosseto	Carlo Zecchini	9,909	22nd in the Serie B
Gubbio	Gubbio	Pietro Barbetti	5,300	8th in Lega Pro Prima Divisione B
L'Aquila	L'Aquila	Tommaso Fattori	10,000	5th in Lega Pro Seconda Divisione B
Lecce	Lecce	Via del Mare	33,876	2nd in Lega Pro Prima Divisione A
Nocerina^{2}	Nocera Inferiore	San Francesco	7,632	4th in Lega Pro Prima Divisione B
Paganese	Pagani	Marcello Torre	5,900	9th in Lega Pro Prima Divisione B
Perugia	Perugia	Renato Curi	28,000	2nd in Lega Pro Prima Divisione B
Pisa	Pisa	Arena Garibaldi	14,869	5th in Lega Pro Prima Divisione B
Pontedera	Pontedera	Ettore Mannucci	5,000	2nd in Lega Pro Seconda Divisione B
Prato	Prato	Lungobisenzio	6,750	12th in Lega Pro Prima Divisione B
Salernitana	Salerno	Arechi	37,245	1st in Lega Pro Seconda Divisione B
Viareggio	Viareggio	Torquato Bresciani	7,000	11th in Lega Pro Prima Divisione B

=== League table ===
Pos	Team	Pld	W	D	L	GF	GA	GD	Pts	Promotion or relegation
1	Perugia (C, P)	32	19	9	4	52	28	+24	66	Promotion to Serie B
2	Frosinone (O, P)	32	18	8	6	53	26	+27	62	Promotion after play-off
3	Lecce	32	19	4	9	51	30	+21	61	Promotion play-off
4	Catanzaro	32	13	16	3	34	17	+17	55	Promotion play-off
5	L'Aquila	32	15	8	9	43	28	+15	53	Promotion play-off
6	Pisa	32	14	10	8	41	27	+14	52	Promotion play-off
7	Benevento	32	13	12	7	58	36	+22	51	Promotion play-off
8	Pontedera	32	13	10	9	53	46	+7	49	Promotion play-off
9	Salernitana	32	12	10	10	44	33	+11	46	Promotion play-off
10	Prato	32	10	13	9	38	40	−2	43	
11	Grosseto	32	11	9	12	34	36	−2	42	
12	Gubbio	32	10	10	12	36	44	−8	40	
13	Viareggio (E, R, R)	32	6	11	15	28	47	−19	29 (Note: Viareggio was not admitted by the Federal Council and will be relegated to Serie D or lower.)	Phoenix in Eccellenza
14	Barletta	32	5	10	17	22	51	−29	25	
15	Ascoli	32	8	7	17	32	45	−13	24 (Note: Ascoli was docked 4 points and an additional 3 points.)	
16	Paganese	32	5	5	22	26	53	−27	20	
17	Nocerina (D, R, R)	32	3	5	24	18	76	−58	12 (Note: Nocerina was docked 2 points. On 13 February 2014 the club was excluded from the championship and demoted to Serie D as decided by FIGC. All their remaining matches were forfeited in favor of their opponents, 0–3.)	Relegation to Eccellenza

Source: Lega Pro
Rules for classification: 1) points; 2) goal difference; 3) number of goals scored.
(C) Champions; (D) Disqualified; (E) Eliminated; (O) Play-off winners; (P) Promoted; (R) Relegated

=== Play-off ===
Quarter-finals
4	Catanzaro	1	1
7	Benevento	2	2
3	Lecce (pso)	0(8)	0(8)
8	Pontedera	0(7)	0(7)
5	L'Aquila	0	0
6	Pisa	1	1
2	Frosinone	2	2
9	Salernitana	0	0

Semi-finals
7	Benevento	1	0	1
3	Lecce	1	2	3
6	Pisa	0	1	1
2	Frosinone	0	2	2

Final
3	Lecce	1	1	2
2	Frosinone (aet)	1	3	4

== Supercup ==
- Virtus Entella 1–1 Perugia

Stadio Comunale, Chiavari

- Perugia 3–1 Virtus Entella

Stadio Renato Curi, Perugia

Perugia champions.
