= Ballardini =

Ballardini is an Italian surname. Notable people with the surname include:

- Davide Ballardini (born 1964), Italian footballer and manager
- Elia Ballardini (born 1991), Italian footballer, son of Davide
- Renato Ballardini (1927–2025), Italian resistance fighter and politician

== See also ==
- Ballarini
