= Limbergo Taccola =

Italian footballer

Personal information
- Date of birth: January 1, 1928
- Place of birth: Viareggio, Italy
- Date of death: November 26, 2003 (aged 75)
- Place of death: Viareggio, Italy
- Position: Midfielder

Senior career*
Years	Team	Apps	(Gls)
1948–1949	Viareggio		
1949–1950	Roma	1	(0)
1950–1951	Verona	0	(0)
1951–1953	Chieti	55	(2)
1953–1956	Pisa	55	(6)
- * Club domestic league appearances and goals

Limbergo Taccola (January 1, 1928 -2003) was an Italian professional football player.

He played 1 game in the Serie A in the 1949/50 season for A.S. Roma. Taccola suffered a serious injury during an automobile accident while playing with Pisa S.C. and had to retire from playing football.

Taccola died in November 2003.
