= Cernuto =

Cernuto is an Italian surname. Notable people with the surname include:

- Francesco Cernuto (born 1992), Italian footballer
- John Cernuto (1944–2025), American poker player
- Holly Beth Vincent (born Cernuto in 1956), American singer-songwriter
