= Mauro Vigorito =

Italian footballer

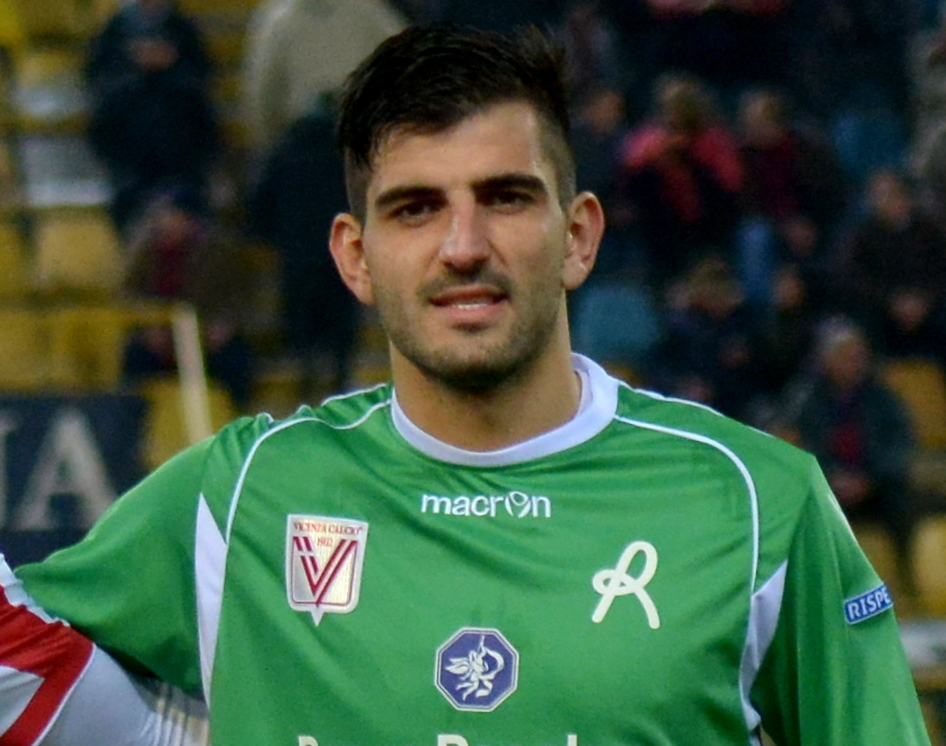
- Vigorito with Vicenza in 2015

Personal information
- Date of birth: 22 May 1990 (age 36)
- Place of birth: Bosa, Italy
- Height: 1.87 m (6 ft 2 in)
- Position: Goalkeeper

Team information
- Current team: Como
- Number: 22

Youth career
- Cagliari

Senior career*
Years	Team	Apps	(Gls)
2009–2012	Cagliari	2	(0)
2010–2011	→ Carrarese (loan)	3	(0)
2012	→ Triestina (loan)	4	(0)
2012–2013	Lumezzane	28	(0)
2013–2014	Venezia	21	(0)
2014–2017	Vicenza	68	(0)
2017–2018	Frosinone	21	(0)
2018–2021	Lecce	38	(0)
2021–2023	Cosenza	18	(0)
2022–2023	→ Como (loan)	4	(0)
2023–	Como	0	(0)
- * Club domestic league appearances and goals as of 13 July 2023

Mauro Vigorito (born 22 May 1990) is an Italian professional footballer who plays as a goalkeeper for Serie A club Como.

== Club career ==
=== Cagliari ===
Vigorito made his Serie A debut for Cagliari on 31 January 2010, when he came on as a substitute for the injured Federico Marchetti in the 21st minute against Fiorentina.

=== Venezia ===
On 18 July 2013, Vigorito was signed by Venezia in a co-ownership deal from Cagliari.

=== Vicenza ===
On 28 August 2014, Davide D'Appolonia and Vigorito were signed by Vicenza from Venezia.

On 8 June 2015, Vigorito signed a new two-year contract.

=== Como ===
On 1 September 2022, Vigorito moved to Como on a season-long loan.

== Career statistics ==
As of match played 13 January 2024

Appearances and goals by club, season and competition
Club	Season	League			Cup		Europe		Other		Total	
Club	Season	Division	Apps	Goals	Apps	Goals	Apps	Goals	Apps	Goals	Apps	Goals
Cagliari	2007–08	Serie A	0	0	0	0	—		—		0	0
Cagliari	2008–09	Serie A	0	0	0	0	—		—		0	0
Cagliari	2009–10	Serie A	2	0	0	0	—		—		2	0
Cagliari	2011–12	Serie A	0	0	0	0	—		—		0	0
Cagliari	Total		2	0	0	0	—		—		2	0
Carrarese (loan)	2010–11	Lega Pro 2D	3	0	—		—		—		3	0
Triestina (loan)	2011–12	Lega Pro 1D	3	0	—		—		1	0	4	0
Lumezzane	2012–13	Lega Pro 1D	28	0	2	0	—		0	0	30	0
Venezia	2013–14	Lega Pro 1D	21	0	1	0	—		0	0	22	0
Vicenza	2014–15	Serie B	23	0	0	0	—		1	0	24	0
Vicenza	2015–16	Serie B	29	0	1	0	—		—		30	0
Vicenza	2016–17	Serie B	15	0	0	0	—		—		15	0
Vicenza	Total		67	0	1	0	—		1	0	69	0
Frosinone	2017–18	Serie B	17	0	0	0	—		4	0	21	0
Lecce	2018–19	Serie B	33	0	2	0	—		—		35	0
Lecce	2019–20	Serie A	5	0	1	0	—		—		6	0
Lecce	2020–21	Serie B	0	0	1	0	—		0	0	1	0
Lecce	Total		38	0	4	0	—		0	0	42	0
Cosenza	2021–22	Serie B	18	0	0	0	—		0	0	18	0
Como (loan)	2022–23	Serie B	4	0	0	0	—		—		4	0
Como	2023–24	Serie B	1	0	0	0	—		—		1	0
Como	2024–25	Serie A	0	0	0	0	—		—		0	0
Como	2025–26	Serie A	0	0	0	0	—		—		0	0
Como	Como total		5	0	0	0	—		—		5	0
Career total			202	0	7	0	0	0	6	0	215	0
