= Alessandro Martinelli =

Swiss footballer (born 1993)

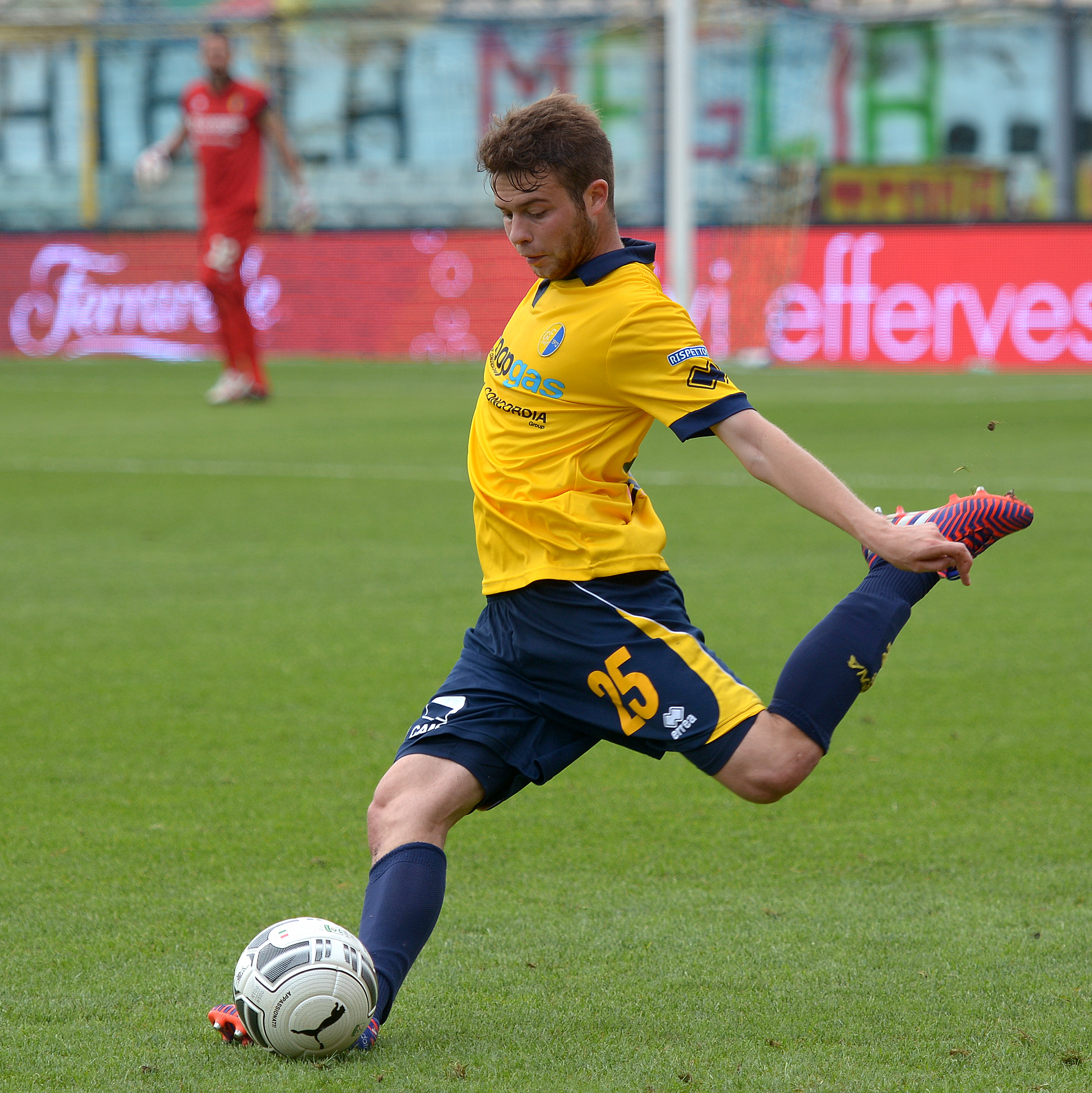
- Martinelli playing for Modena in 2015

Personal information
- Date of birth: 30 May 1993 (age 33)
- Place of birth: Mendrisio, Switzerland
- Height: 1.75 m (5 ft 9 in)
- Position: Midfielder

Team information
- Current team: FC Mendrisio
- Number: 25

Youth career
- –2009: Grasshopper
- 2009–2012: Sampdoria

Senior career*
Years	Team	Apps	(Gls)
2012–2017	Sampdoria	0	(0)
2012–2013	→ PortoSummaga (loan)	26	(0)
2013–2014	→ Venezia (loan)	20	(1)
2014–2015	→ Modena (loan)	20	(0)
2015–2017	→ Brescia (loan)	67	(2)
2017–2019	Brescia	47	(0)
2019–2020	Palermo	24	(1)
2021–2022	AS Castello		
2022–	FC Mendrisio	11	(0)

International career^{‡}
2008	Switzerland U15	4	(0)
2008–2009	Switzerland U16	8	(0)
2009–2010	Switzerland U17	12	(1)
2010–2011	Switzerland U18	2	(0)
2011–2012	Switzerland U19	6	(0)
2013	Switzerland U21	1	(0)
- * Club domestic league appearances and goals as of 12 June 2021 ‡ National team caps and goals as of 15 October 2013

Alessandro Martinelli (born 30 May 1993) is a Swiss professional footballer, currently playing as midfielder for FC Mendrisio in Seconda Lega, the sixth tier of Swiss football league system.

== Club career ==
=== Sampdoria ===
Born in Mendrisio, Ticino, an Italian-speaking canton, Switzerland, Martinelli moved south to Italy to start his professional career. He left the reserve team of U.C. Sampdoria in 2012 for Calcio Portogruaro Summaga.

Martinelli returned to Sampdoria in June 2013; he signed a new five-year contract with the Genoese club.

On 2 September 2013, he was signed by Venezia. On 7 July 2014, he was signed by Modena in a temporary deal, with an option to purchase.

=== Brescia ===
He left for Brescia in the same formula on 9 July 2015.

On 25 July 2016, the loan was renewed, and in August 2017 Martinelli signed for Brescia on a permanent basis.

=== Palermo ===
In August 2019, he was signed by Serie D club Palermo. As a regular, and also captaining the team in Mario Santana's absence, he won promotion to Serie C on his debut season with the Rosanero.

On 7 September 2020, Palermo announced Martinelli was forced to retire from active football due to cardiac issues.

== International career ==
Martinelli played every game in 2010 UEFA European Under-17 Championship. He also played for Swiss U18 team against Belgium and against Spain. He also received call-up against Austria and France but did not play. He only played once for Swiss U19 team in competitive match in 2012 UEFA European Under-19 Football Championship elite qualification. He received call-up against Northern Ireland (he played once), Finland, (he played twice) Netherlands (once) and Estonia (once) in friendlies. In October 2013 he received his first U21 call-up. He made his debut as one of the starting XI.

== Career statistics ==
=== Club ===
As of 12 June 2021

Appearances and goals by club, season and competition
Club	Season	League			National cup		Other		Total	
Club	Season	Division	Apps	Goals	Apps	Goals	Apps	Goals	Apps	Goals
Portogruaro (loan)	2012–13	Lega Pro Prima Divisione	26	0	2	0	0	0	28	0
Venezia (loan)	2013–14	Lega Pro Prima Divisione	20	1	1	0	—		21	1
Modena (loan)	2014–15	Serie B	20	0	1	0	1 (Note: All appearance(s) in relegation play-outs.)	0	22	0
Brescia	2015–16 (loan)	Serie B	33	0	2	0	—		35	0
Brescia	2016–17 (loan)	Serie B	34	2	0	0	—		34	2
Brescia	2017–18	Serie B	33	0	0	0	—		33	0
Brescia	2018–19	Serie B	14	0	1	0	—		15	0
Brescia	Total		114	2	3	0	0	0	117	2
Palermo	2019–20	Serie D	24	1	1	0	—		25	1
AS Castello	2020–21	Seconda Lega	2	1	—		—		2	1
Career total			206	5	8	0	1	0	215	5
