= Capogrosso =

Capogrosso is an Italian surname. Notable people with the surname include:

- Gaetano Capogrosso (born 1989), Italian footballer
- Nicolás Capogrosso (born 1995), Argentine beach volleyball player
