= Lancini =

Lancini is an Italian surname. Notable people with it include:

- Danilo Oscar Lancini (born 1965), Italian politician
- Edoardo Lancini (born 1994), Italian footballer
- Nicola Lancini (born 1994), Italian footballer

== See also ==
- Lancini's robber frog, a species of frog in the family Craugastoridae
