= Leonardo Massoni =

Italian footballer (born 1987)

Personal information
- Date of birth: 17 February 1987 (age 39)
- Place of birth: Pietrasanta, Italy
- Height: 1.94 m (6 ft 4 in)
- Position: Centre-back

Team information
- Current team: Massese

Youth career
- Lucchese

Senior career*
Years	Team	Apps	(Gls)
2006–2008	Lucchese	0	(0)
2006–2008	→ Viareggio (loan)	39	(1)
2008–2009	Viareggio	28	(4)
2009–2011	Verona	6	(0)
2010–2011	→ Viareggio (loan)	31	(1)
2011–2012	Sassuolo	0	(0)
2011–2012	→ Lanciano (loan)	29	(2)
2013–2014	Perugia	24	(1)
2014–2015	Monza	17	(1)
2015–2017	Carrarese	66	(0)
2017	Crema	7	(0)
2017–	Massese	7	(0)
- * Club domestic league appearances and goals as of 24 February 2018

Leonardo Massoni (born 17 February 1987) is an Italian footballer who plays for Italian club Massese.

== Biography ==
Born in Pietrasanta, the Province of Lucca, Massoni started his career at Lucca team Lucchese. He spent 2 seasons loaned to Viareggio in 2006–07 and 2007–08 season, winning Serie D and remain in Serie C2 by winning the relegation playoffs in 2008. After the bankrupt of Lucchese he was signed by Serie B team Sassuolo but farmed back to Viareggio in co-ownership deal, rejoining Lucchese teammate Maikol Benassi and Luca Ruglioni. He played 28 league matches that season and played both legs of promotion playoffs. Despite the team finished as the losing semi-finalists, Viareggio promoted to fill the vacancies left by the bankrupted teams on July 30th. On June 25th Sassuolo bought him back but re-sold to Prima Divisione team Verona in another co-ownership deal, for €50,000 along with Sassuolo teammate Filippo Pensalfini and Andy Selva. He only played 6 times in the league and 1 more in the promotion playoffs. On 12 July 2010 Viareggio re-signed Massoni and also borrowed Davide Bertolucci from Verona. He almost played all the matches for Viareggio, only missed 3 league matches due to suspensions. In the cup he played 3 out of 6 possible matches. He started in the relegation playoffs, partnered with Lorenzo Fiale, winning Cosenza in aggregate.

On 24 June 2011 Sassuolo bought Massoni back for a peppercorn of €500, in 2-year contract.

== Honours ==
- Serie D: 2007
