= 2012–13 Lega Pro Prima Divisione =

Lega Pro Prima Divisione
- Season: 2012–13
- Champions: Trapani (Girone A); Avellino (Girone B)
- Promoted: Trapani, Carpi (Girone A); Avellino, Latina (Girone B)

The 2012–13 Lega Pro Prima Divisione season was the thirty-fifth football league season of Italian Lega Pro Prima Divisione since its establishment in 1978, and the fifth since the renaming from Serie C to Lega Pro.

It was divided into two phases: the regular season, and the playoff phase.

The league was also composed of 33 teams divided into two divisions of 17 and 16 teams respectively for group A and B.

There was only one repechage from Lega Pro Seconda Divisione by Virtus Entella, because no other teams showed interest to submit the application for the high price of the guarantee and the repayable contribution required.

Teams finishing first in the regular season, plus one team winning the playoff round from each division were promoted to Serie B; teams finishing last in the regular season, plus two relegation playoff losers from each division were relegated to Lega Pro Seconda Divisione. In all, four teams were promoted to Serie B, and six teams were relegated to Lega Pro Seconda Divisione.

== Girone A ==
=== Teams ===
Teams from Apulia, Emilia-Romagna, Liguria, Lombardy, Piedmont, Sicily, Trentino-Alto Adige/Südtirol & Veneto

Location of teams in Girone A 2012–13

| Club | City | Stadium | Capacity | 2011–12 season |
|---|---|---|---|---|
| AlbinoLeffe | Albino and Leffe (playing in Bergamo) | Atleti Azzurri d'Italia | 26,542 | 22nd in Serie B |
| Carpi | Carpi | Sandro Cabassi | 4,164 | 3rd in Lega Pro Prima Divisione A |
| Como | Como | Giuseppe Sinigaglia | 13,602 | 13th in Lega Pro Prima Divisione A |
| Cremonese | Cremona | Giovanni Zini | 20,641 | 5th in Lega Pro Prima Divisione B |
| Cuneo | Cuneo | Fratelli Paschiero | 4,000 | 3rd in Lega Pro Seconda Divisione A |
| FeralpiSalò | Salò and Lonato del Garda (playing in Salò) | Lino Turina | 2,000 | 14th in Lega Pro Prima Divisione A |
| Lecce | Lecce | Via del Mare | 33,876 | 18th in Serie A |
| Lumezzane | Lumezzane | Nuovo Comunale | 4,150 | 8th in Lega Pro Prima Divisione A |
| Pavia | Pavia | Pietro Fortunati | 4,999 | 16th in Lega Pro Prima Divisione A |
| Portogruaro | Portogruaro | Piergiovanni Mecchia | 4,021 | 10th in Lega Pro Prima Divisione B |
| Reggiana | Reggio Emilia | Città del Tricolore | 20,084 | 9th in Lega Pro Prima Divisione A |
| San Marino | Serravalle | Olimpico | 7,000 | 2nd in Lega Pro Seconda Divisione A |
| Südtirol | Bolzano | Druso | 3,500 | 7th in Lega Pro Prima Divisione B |
| Trapani | Trapani (playing in Erice) | Provinciale | 6,776 | 2nd in Lega Pro Prima Divisione B |
| Treviso | Treviso | Omobono Tenni | 10,000 | 1st in Lega Pro Seconda Divisione A |
| Tritium | Trezzo sull'Adda (playing in Monza) | Stadio Brianteo | 18,568 | 12th in Lega Pro Prima Divisione A |
| Virtus Entella | Chiavari | Comunale | 2,500 | 5th in Lega Pro Seconda Divisione A |

=== League table ===
| Pos | Team | Pld | W | D | L | GF | GA | GD | Pts | Promotion or relegation |
|---|---|---|---|---|---|---|---|---|---|---|
| 1 | Trapani (C, P) | 32 | 18 | 10 | 4 | 60 | 31 | +29 | 64 | Promotion to Serie B |
| 2 | Lecce | 32 | 18 | 7 | 7 | 56 | 34 | +22 | 61 | Qualification for Promotion play-off |
| 3 | Carpi (O, P) | 32 | 14 | 9 | 9 | 38 | 30 | +8 | 51 | Qualification for Promotion play-off |
| 4 | Südtirol | 32 | 13 | 11 | 8 | 43 | 33 | +10 | 50 (Note: VIR 1-1 SUD; SUD 3-0 VIR) | Qualification for Promotion play-off |
| 5 | Virtus Entella | 32 | 12 | 14 | 6 | 48 | 36 | +12 | 50 | Qualification for Promotion play-off |
| 6 | AlbinoLeffe | 32 | 13 | 14 | 5 | 44 | 27 | +17 | 47 (Note: AlbinoLeffe was docked 6 points due to the 2011 Italian football scandal.) | |
| 7 | Cremonese | 32 | 11 | 14 | 7 | 45 | 27 | +18 | 46 (Note: Cremonese was docked 1 point due to the 2011 Italian football scandal.) | |
| 8 | Lumezzane | 32 | 10 | 13 | 9 | 39 | 38 | +1 | 43 (Note: LUM: 8 pts; FER: 5 pts; SAN: 2 pts) | |
| 9 | FeralpiSalò | 32 | 12 | 7 | 13 | 36 | 44 | −8 | 43 | |
| 10 | San Marino | 32 | 12 | 7 | 13 | 41 | 43 | −2 | 43 | |
| 11 | Pavia | 32 | 10 | 10 | 12 | 29 | 35 | −6 | 40 | |
| 12 | Como | 32 | 9 | 12 | 11 | 44 | 50 | −6 | 38 (Note: Como and Treviso were docked 1 point due to financial irregularities.) | |
| 13 | Portogruaro (R) | 32 | 8 | 14 | 10 | 30 | 36 | −6 | 37 (Note: Portogruaro was docked 1 point for objective responsibility due to idea to throw the match Portogruaro-Crotone of 2009-10 season in Serie B.) (Note: Portogruaro and Tritium were not admitted by the Federal Council and will be relegated to Serie Promozione.) | Relegation to Promozione |
| 14 | Cuneo (R) | 32 | 8 | 11 | 13 | 27 | 32 | −5 | 35 | Qualification for Relegation play-off |
| 15 | Reggiana | 32 | 8 | 5 | 19 | 28 | 51 | −23 | 29 | Qualification for Relegation play-off |
| 16 | Tritium (R) | 32 | 3 | 11 | 18 | 23 | 58 | −35 | 20 (Note: TRI 2-0 TRE; TRE 1-1 TRI) | Relegation to Promozione |
| 17 | Treviso (R) | 32 | 4 | 9 | 19 | 28 | 54 | −26 | 20 (Note: Treviso didn't enroll in the next Lega Pro Seconda championship and will be relegated to Promozione.) | Relegation to Promozione |

Source: Lega Pro Prima Divisione
Rules for classification: 1) points; 2) goal difference; 3) number of goals scored.
(C) Champions; (O) Play-off winners; (P) Promoted; (R) Relegated

=== Promotion Playoffs ===
==== Semifinals ====
First legs scheduled 26 May 2013; return legs scheduled 2 June 2013

| Team 1 | Agg. | Team 2 | 1st leg | 2nd leg |
|---|---|---|---|---|
| Virtus Entella (5) | 2–3 | (2) Lecce | 1–1 | 1–2 |
| Südtirol (4) | 3–4 | (3) Carpi | 1–2 | 2–2 |

==== Final ====
First leg scheduled 9 June 2013; return leg scheduled 16 June 2013

| Team 1 | Agg. | Team 2 | 1st leg | 2nd leg |
|---|---|---|---|---|
| Carpi (3) | 2-1 | (2) Lecce | 1–0 | 1-1 |

=== Relegation Playoffs ===
First legs scheduled 25, 26 May 2013; return legs scheduled 2 June 2013

| Team 1 | Agg. | Team 2 | 1st leg | 2nd leg |
|---|---|---|---|---|
| Tritium (16) | 3–2 | (13) Portogruaro | 1–1 | 2–1 |
| Reggiana (15) | 2–1 | (14) Cuneo | 1–1 | 1–0 |

=== Results ===
| Home \ Away | ALB | CRP | COM | CRE | CUN | FER | LCE | LUM | PAV | POR | REA | SMR | SÜD | TRA | TRV | TRI | VET |
|---|---|---|---|---|---|---|---|---|---|---|---|---|---|---|---|---|---|
| AlbinoLeffe | | 1–0 | 3–1 | 1–1 | 2–1 | 1–1 | 2–1 | 1–2 | 0–0 | 3–0 | 3–0 | 1–1 | 1–1 | 1–1 | 0–0 | 1–1 | 3–1 |
| Carpi | 2–1 | | 1–2 | 1–1 | 1–3 | 3–0 | 1–0 | 1–0 | 2–0 | 0–0 | 2–0 | 1–0 | 0–2 | 1–3 | 1–0 | 2–1 | 3–1 |
| Como | 2–1 | 0–0 | | 0–0 | 1–4 | 0–2 | 2–2 | 3–0 | 1–2 | 1–1 | 2–0 | 3–1 | 2–2 | 2–2 | 4–3 | 4–0 | 0–1 |
| Cremonese | 1–1 | 3–2 | 3–1 | | 2–0 | 2–0 | 1–1 | 0–0 | 0–1 | 0–0 | 0–0 | 1–1 | 2–1 | 3–4 | 2–0 | 5–0 | 1–1 |
| Cuneo | 0–0 | 0–0 | 1–1 | 1–1 | | 2–0 | 1–2 | 1–1 | 2–0 | 0–1 | 0–0 | 0–1 | 0–0 | 0–1 | 0–0 | 1–2 | 1–1 |
| FeralpiSalò | 0–0 | 0–1 | 1–3 | 1–0 | 3–1 | | 4–0 | 0–0 | 0–3 | 2–2 | 2–1 | 1–1 | 3–1 | 1–2 | 3–0 | 1–0 | 1–1 |
| Lecce | 0–0 | 2–2 | 2–0 | 3–2 | 2–0 | 3–0 | | 5–0 | 1–0 | 2–1 | 2–1 | 2–0 | 0–1 | 1–2 | 2–1 | 2–0 | 4–2 |
| Lumezzane | 1–2 | 1–1 | 1–1 | 2–1 | 1–2 | 2–0 | 2–1 | | 2–0 | 1–1 | 2–0 | 2–0 | 1–0 | 1–1 | 3–0 | 5–2 | 1–1 |
| Pavia | 0–2 | 0–0 | 2–1 | 2–1 | 0–2 | 1–2 | 2–2 | 0–0 | | 2–3 | 1–0 | 0–1 | 2–1 | 2–2 | 2–0 | 0–0 | 1–1 |
| Portogruaro | 1–4 | 2–0 | 2–2 | 0–2 | 1–0 | 1–1 | 0–0 | 2–1 | 2–2 | | 0–1 | 2–1 | 1–0 | 1–1 | 2–0 | 1–1 | 1–1 |
| Reggiana | 1–1 | 2–1 | 0–1 | 0–1 | 2–0 | 1–4 | 0–2 | 2–1 | 0–1 | 2–1 | | 1–3 | 2–2 | 1–3 | 0–1 | 4–0 | 2–0 |
| San Marino | 1–2 | 0–3 | 3–0 | 1–6 | 0–0 | 0–1 | 3–1 | 1–1 | 0–1 | 2–0 | 4–0 | | 2–1 | 0–1 | 1–0 | 3–1 | 2–2 |
| Südtirol | 1–1 | 2–1 | 0–0 | 1–0 | 2–1 | 3–0 | 1–2 | 4–2 | 2–1 | 1–0 | 3–0 | 0–0 | | 1–1 | 2–1 | 0–0 | 3–0 |
| Trapani | 1–3 | 0–1 | 1–0 | 0–0 | 3–0 | 4–1 | 0–1 | 2–0 | 3–0 | 0–0 | 2–2 | 4–0 | 4–0 | | 3–2 | 2–0 | 0–0 |
| Treviso | 2–1 | 1–2 | 2–2 | 1–1 | 1–2 | 3–0 | 1–3 | 1–1 | 0–0 | 0–0 | 2–1 | 1–3 | 1–3 | 2–3 | | 1–1 | 0–0 |
| Tritium | 0–1 | 1–1 | 2–2 | 0–2 | 0–0 | 0–1 | 0–3 | 1–1 | 0–0 | 1–0 | 1–2 | 2–5 | 1–1 | 1–2 | 2–0 | | 2–3 |
| Virtus Entella | 2–0 | 1–1 | 5–0 | 0–0 | 0–1 | 2–0 | 2–2 | 1–1 | 2–1 | 2–1 | 3–0 | 2–0 | 1–1 | 3–2 | 4–1 | 2–0 | |

Source: http://www.lega-pro.com/sito/index.php/divisione-1-girone-a-statistica
Legend: Blue = home team win; Yellow = draw; Red = away team win.

== Girone B ==
=== Teams ===
Teams from Apulia, Calabria, Campania, Lazio, Tuscany & Umbria

Location of teams in Girone B 2011–12

| Club | City | Stadium | Capacity | 2011–12 season |
|---|---|---|---|---|
| Andria BAT | Andria | Degli Ulivi | 9,140 | 12th in Lega Pro Prima Divisione B |
| Avellino | Avellino | Partenio-Lombardi | 7,450 | 10th in Lega Pro Prima Divisione A |
| Barletta | Barletta | Cosimo Puttilli | 4,018 | 6th in Lega Pro Prima Divisione B |
| Benevento | Benevento | Ciro Vigorito | 12,847 | 6th in Lega Pro Prima Divisione A |
| Carrarese | Carrara | dei Marmi | 9,500 | 8th in Lega Pro Prima Divisione B |
| Catanzaro | Catanzaro | Nicola Ceravolo | 14,650 | 2nd in Lega Pro Seconda Divisione B |
| Frosinone | Frosinone | Matusa | 9,680 | 9th in Lega Pro Prima Divisione B |
| Gubbio | Gubbio | Pietro Barbetti | 5,300 | 21st in Serie B |
| Latina | Latina | Domenico Francioni | 6,850 | 16th in Lega Pro Prima Divisione B |
| Nocerina | Nocera Inferiore | San Francesco | 7,632 | 20th in Serie B |
| Paganese | Pagani | Marcello Torre | 5,900 | 6th in Lega Pro Seconda Divisione B |
| Perugia | Perugia | Renato Curi | 28,000 | 1st in Lega Pro Seconda Divisione B |
| Pisa | Pisa | Arena Garibaldi | 14,869 | 7th in Lega Pro Prima Divisione A |
| Prato | Prato | Lungobisenzio | 6,750 | 14th in Lega Pro Prima Divisione B |
| Sorrento | Sorrento | Italia | 3,600 | 4th in Lega Pro Prima Divisione A |
| Viareggio | Viareggio | Torquato Bresciani | 7,000 | 14th in Lega Pro Prima Divisione A |

=== League table ===
| Pos | Team | Pld | W | D | L | GF | GA | GD | Pts | Qualification or relegation |
|---|---|---|---|---|---|---|---|---|---|---|
| 1 | Avellino (C, P) | 30 | 18 | 6 | 6 | 50 | 27 | +23 | 60 | Promotion to Serie B |
| 2 | Perugia | 30 | 18 | 5 | 7 | 48 | 29 | +19 | 58 (Note: Latina and Perugia were docked 1 point due to financial irregularities.) | Qualification for Promotion play-off |
| 3 | Latina (O, P) | 30 | 15 | 9 | 6 | 41 | 28 | +13 | 53 (Note: NOC 0-1 LAT; LAT 1-1 NOC) | Qualification for Promotion play-off |
| 4 | Nocerina | 30 | 15 | 8 | 7 | 48 | 32 | +16 | 53 | Qualification for Promotion play-off |
| 5 | Pisa | 30 | 15 | 7 | 8 | 43 | 33 | +10 | 52 | Qualification for Promotion play-off |
| 6 | Benevento | 30 | 11 | 10 | 9 | 35 | 28 | +7 | 43 | |
| 7 | Frosinone | 30 | 10 | 11 | 9 | 36 | 30 | +6 | 40 (Note: GUB 1-0 FRO; FRO 2-0 GUB) (Note: Frosinone was docked 1 point due to the 2011 Italian football scandal.) | |
| 8 | Gubbio | 30 | 11 | 7 | 12 | 32 | 39 | −7 | 40 | |
| 9 | Paganese | 30 | 9 | 12 | 9 | 29 | 30 | −1 | 39 | |
| 10 | Catanzaro | 30 | 10 | 7 | 13 | 37 | 48 | −11 | 37 | |
| 11 | Viareggio | 30 | 9 | 9 | 12 | 35 | 46 | −11 | 36 | |
| 12 | Prato | 30 | 8 | 9 | 13 | 30 | 37 | −7 | 33 | Qualification for Relegation play-off |
| 13 | Andria BAT (R) | 30 | 7 | 13 | 10 | 23 | 30 | −7 | 32 (Note: Andria BAT was docked 2 points due to financial irregularities.) | Relegation to Eccellenza (Note: Andria BAT didn't enroll in the next Lega Pro Seconda championship and will be relegated to Eccellenza.) |
| 14 | Barletta | 30 | 6 | 9 | 15 | 27 | 39 | −12 | 27 | Qualification for Relegation play-off |
| 15 | Sorrento (R) | 30 | 5 | 8 | 17 | 24 | 44 | −20 | 23 | Qualification for Relegation play-off |
| 16 | Carrarese | 30 | 5 | 6 | 19 | 31 | 49 | −18 | 21 | Relegation to Lega Pro Seconda Divisione (Note: Carrarese remained in the league to fill the vacancies created.) |

Source: Lega Pro Prima Divisione
Rules for classification: 1) points; 2) goal difference; 3) number of goals scored.
(C) Champions; (O) Play-off winners; (P) Promoted; (R) Relegated

=== Promotion Playoffs ===
==== Semifinals ====
First legs scheduled 26 May 2013; return legs scheduled 2 June 2013

| Team 1 | Agg. | Team 2 | 1st leg | 2nd leg |
|---|---|---|---|---|
| Pisa (5) | 4–3 | (2) Perugia | 2–1 | 2–2 |
| Nocerina (4) | 1–1 | (3) Latina | 1–0 | 0–1 |

==== Final ====
First leg scheduled 9 June 2013; return leg scheduled 16 June 2013

| Team 1 | Agg. | Team 2 | 1st leg | 2nd leg |
|---|---|---|---|---|
| Pisa (5) | 1-3 | (3) Latina | 0–0 | 1-3 (aet) |

=== Relegation Playoffs ===
First legs scheduled 26 May 2013; return legs scheduled 2 June 2013

| Team 1 | Agg. | Team 2 | 1st leg | 2nd leg |
|---|---|---|---|---|
| Sorrento (16) | 2–3 | (13) Prato | 1–1 | 1–2 |
| Barletta (15) | 3–0 | (14) Andria | 2–0 | 1–0 |

=== Results ===
| Home \ Away | AND | AVE | BRL | BEN | CAR | CTZ | FRO | GUB | LAT | NOC | PAG | PER | PIS | PRA | SOR | VIA |
|---|---|---|---|---|---|---|---|---|---|---|---|---|---|---|---|---|
| Andria BAT | | 0–2 | 0–0 | 1–1 | 2–2 | 0–0 | 1–0 | 1–2 | 0–1 | 0–1 | 0–1 | 1–1 | 1–1 | 2–0 | 1–0 | 2–1 |
| Avellino | 4–0 | | 1–0 | 0–2 | 2–1 | 2–0 | 1–0 | 2–0 | 1–1 | 1–0 | 1–1 | 1–1 | 2–3 | 1–1 | 3–0 | 1–0 |
| Barletta | 0–1 | 2–3 | | 2–2 | 2–2 | 0–1 | 0–0 | 1–2 | 1–3 | 0–0 | 0–1 | 0–1 | 1–0 | 3–0 | 0–0 | 4–0 |
| Benevento | 0–1 | 1–2 | 0–0 | | 1–0 | 2–0 | 0–0 | 2–1 | 1–0 | 1–2 | 2–0 | 0–1 | 2–1 | 1–2 | 1–0 | 2–0 |
| Carrarese | 0–0 | 0–1 | 1–2 | 0–3 | | 2–2 | 0–1 | 2–2 | 1–1 | 2–1 | 1–2 | 0–1 | 2–3 | 1–0 | 5–0 | 1–3 |
| Catanzaro | 0–0 | 0–1 | 4–3 | 1–2 | 2–3 | | 0–3 | 5–2 | 1–3 | 2–3 | 2–1 | 2–4 | 1–0 | 2–1 | 1–0 | 2–0 |
| Frosinone | 2–1 | 2–1 | 3–1 | 0–0 | 1–0 | 4–0 | | 2–0 | 2–1 | 2–2 | 2–2 | 0–1 | 1–2 | 1–1 | 2–4 | 1–1 |
| Gubbio | 1–1 | 2–3 | 0–0 | 1–0 | 0–1 | 1–1 | 1–0 | | 2–1 | 2–1 | 1–0 | 2–3 | 2–1 | 1–0 | 1–2 | 2–1 |
| Latina | 1–1 | 2–1 | 2–0 | 2–2 | 1–0 | 1–0 | 0–0 | 2–0 | | 1–1 | 4–0 | 3–1 | 1–0 | 1–1 | 1–0 | 1–0 |
| Nocerina | 2–2 | 1–0 | 4–0 | 3–2 | 3–0 | 1–1 | 1–0 | 1–1 | 0–1 | | 1–4 | 2–0 | 3–0 | 4–2 | 3–1 | 2–1 |
| Paganese | 2–2 | 4–1 | 1–0 | 0–0 | 2–0 | 0–0 | 1–1 | 1–0 | 1–1 | 0–1 | | 0–2 | 0–0 | 0–0 | 2–0 | 1–0 |
| Perugia | 2–0 | 1–1 | 0–1 | 2–1 | 3–0 | 2–4 | 2–2 | 2–0 | 2–1 | 2–1 | 3–0 | | 1–2 | 3–0 | 2–1 | 4–1 |
| Pisa | 1–0 | 0–3 | 2–2 | 2–0 | 3–1 | 4–1 | 2–1 | 1–0 | 3–1 | 1–1 | 0–0 | 0–1 | | 1–1 | 2–0 | 1–0 |
| Prato | 1–2 | 0–3 | 1–0 | 1–1 | 2–1 | 0–0 | 0–1 | 0–1 | 4–0 | 0–0 | 2–1 | 2–0 | 1–3 | | 1–2 | 3–0 |
| Sorrento | 0–0 | 1–4 | 1–2 | 1–1 | 2–0 | 0–1 | 2–2 | 0–0 | 1–2 | 3–0 | 0–0 | 0–0 | 1–2 | 0–2 | | 1–1 |
| Viareggio | 1–0 | 1–1 | 3–0 | 2–2 | 3–2 | 3–1 | 2–0 | 2–2 | 1–1 | 0–3 | 2–1 | 1–0 | 2–2 | 1–1 | 2–1 | |

Source: http://www.lega-pro.com/sito/index.php/divisione-1-girone-b-statistica
Legend: Blue = home team win; Yellow = draw; Red = away team win.
