= Matteo Calamai =

Italian footballer (born 1991)

Personal information
- Date of birth: 10 March 1991 (age 35)
- Place of birth: Fiesole, Italy
- Height: 1.75 m (5 ft 9 in)
- Position: Midfielder

Team information
- Current team: San Donato
- Number: 4

Youth career
- Fiorentina
- 2009–2011: Siena

Senior career*
Years	Team	Apps	(Gls)
2010–2012	Siena	10	(0)
2010–2011	→ Viareggio (loan)	12	(1)
2011	→ Carpi (loan)	2	(0)
2012–2014	Viareggio	35	(4)
2013–2014	→ Venezia (loan)	23	(1)
2014–2015	Paganese	31	(4)
2015–2016	Ischia	20	(0)
2016–2017	Lumezzane	33	(1)
2017	→ Cosenza (loan)	13	(0)
2017–2018	Cosenza	33	(1)
2018–2019	Olbia	12	(0)
2019	Modena	9	(0)
2019–2020	Picerno	15	(0)
2020	Rimini	5	(0)
2020–2021	Prato	28	(2)
2021–2022	Legnago	5	(0)
2022–	San Donato	4	(0)

International career^{‡}
2006	Italy U16	1	(0)
2009–2010	Italy U18	4	(0)
2010	Italy U19	1	(0)
- * Club domestic league appearances and goals as of 24 September 2022 ‡ National team caps and goals as of 17 March 2010

Matteo Calamai (born 10 March 1991) is an Italian professional footballer who plays as a midfielder for Serie D Group E club San Donato.

== Club career ==
Formed on Fiorentina and Siena youth system, Calamai made his professional debut for Viareggio on 2010–11 Serie C season.

On 14 July 2021, he joined to Legnago Salus. On 27 January 2022, his contract with Legnago was terminated by mutual consent.

== International career ==
Calamai was a youth international for Italy.
