= Maurizio Peccarisi =

Italian footballer

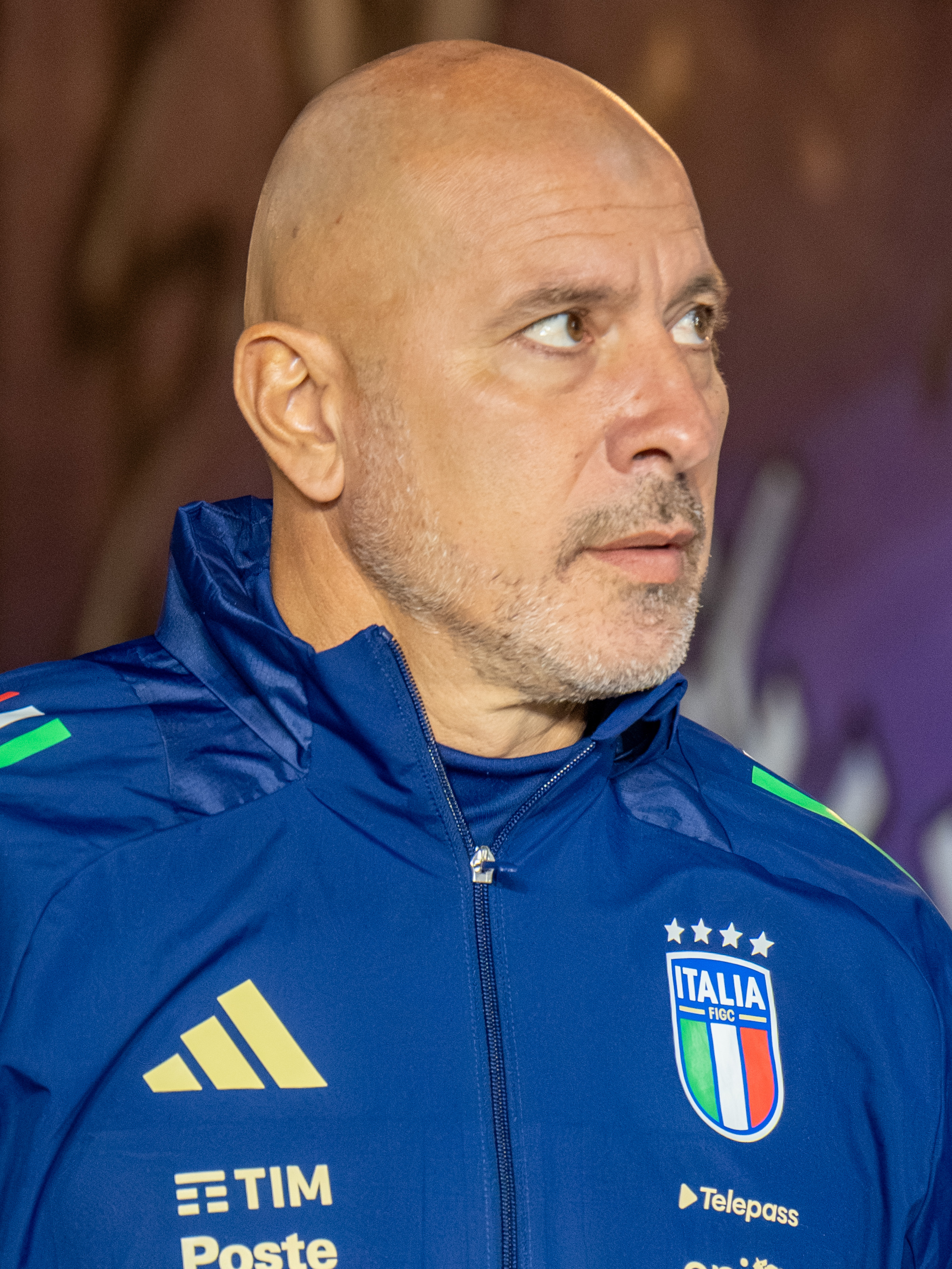

Personal information
- Date of birth: 17 February 1978 (age 48)
- Place of birth: Bordighera, Italy
- Height: 2.00 m (6 ft 7 in)
- Position: Right back

Senior career*
Years	Team	Apps	(Gls)
1995–1997	Reggina	2	(0)
1997–1999	Giulianova	32	(1)
1999–2004	Ancona	70	(0)
2003	→ Arezzo (loan)	11	(1)
2003–2004	→ Cesena (loan)	29	(1)
2004–2005	Torino	33	(0)
2005–2006	Triestina	21	(0)
2006–2008	Rimini	59	(1)
2008–2011	Salernitana	19	(0)
2011–2013	Ascoli	48	(1)
2013–2014	Avellino	26	(0)
2014–2015	Pordenone	11	(0)
2015	Venezia	11	(0)
- * Club domestic league appearances and goals

Maurizio Peccarisi (born 17 February 1978) is an Italian former footballer.

== Career ==
Peccarisi started his career at Reggina. After reached semi-finals at 1999 Serie C1 promotion playoffs, he was signed by Ancona, which he won promotion to Serie B with club in 2000. After no appearances at 2002–03 season, he left for Arezzo at Serie C1 on loan in January 2003. In the next season, Peccarisi was not in the plan of Ancona which promoted to Serie A in 2003. In 2004, he joined Torino and finished as promotion playoffs winner, but unable to promote due to financial problems. He joined Triestina of Serie B which nearly relegated last season. In January 2006, he was signed by Rimini, which the team saved from relegation with 2 more points. In the next season, Peccarisi along with teammate likes Digão, formed a good defensive line, and the team finished as the 5th. But Peccarisi himself injured in April 2007 and back to squad in October. With changes in squad, Rimini finished 7th in 2007–08 season. In mid-2008, he joined Salernitana at Serie B, which he played 19 time for the newly promoted side. He was injured and not played since March 2009.

On 15 September 2014 Peccarisi was signed by Pordenone. On 13 January 2015 Peccarisi and Capogrosso moved to Venezia, with Raffaele Franchini and Emanuele Panzeri moved to opposite direction.
