= Riccardo Bocalon =

Italian footballer

Personal information
- Date of birth: 3 March 1989 (age 37)
- Place of birth: Venice, Italy
- Height: 1.82 m (6 ft 0 in)
- Position: Striker

Team information
- Current team: Unione La Rocca Altavilla

Youth career
- –2008: Treviso

Senior career*
Years	Team	Apps	(Gls)
2008–2015	Inter Milan	0	(0)
2008	→ Treviso (loan)	4	(0)
2009–2011	→ PortoSummaga (loan)	46	(4)
2011	→ Viareggio (loan)	14	(5)
2011–2012	→ Cremonese (loan)	18	(3)
2012	→ Carpi (loan)	6	(1)
2012–2013	→ Südtirol (loan)	6	(1)
2013–2014	→ Venezia (loan)	40	(23)
2014–2015	→ Prato (loan)	35	(16)
2015–2017	Alessandria	68	(34)
2017–2019	Salernitana	55	(15)
2019–2022	Venezia	60	(8)
2020	→ Pordenone (loan)	16	(3)
2022–2023	Trento	32	(9)
2023	Mantova	15	(11)
2023–2024	Aglianese	15	(5)
2024–2025	Renate	49	(9)
2025	Union Clodiense Chioggia	13	(3)
2025–	Unione La Rocca Altavilla	8	(1)
- * Club domestic league appearances and goals as of 22 February 2026

Riccardo Bocalon (born 3 March 1989) is an Italian professional footballer who plays as a striker for Serie D club Unione La Rocca Altavilla.

== Career ==
=== Treviso ===
Born in Venice, Veneto, Bocalon started his career with Treviso. In January 2008, he was signed by Internazionale along with Jacopo Fortunato in co-ownership deals, for €450,000 each, but Bocalon was loaned back to Treviso. He then made his Serie B debut with Treviso. In June 2008, Inter bought the remain 50% registration rights of Bocalon and Fortunato outright for €900,000 in total.

=== Internazionale ===
With the under-20 team of Inter in 2008–09 season, he was the third striker, behind Aiman Napoli and Mattia Destro.

In summer 2009, he was loaned to Porto Summaga and won Lega Pro Prima Divisione. Inter team-mate Gabriele Puccio also joined Portogruaro in co-ownership deal.

In June 2010, the two players remained in Portogruaro. On 20 January 2011 he joined Viareggio.

In July 2011 he joined Cremonese along with Michele Rigione. On 31 January 2012 he was signed by Carpi. In summer 2012 he was signed by Südtirol along with Mame Baba Thiam. He was suffered from injury and missed 3 months. On 29 January 2013 he left the club again.

=== Venezia ===
Bocalon joined his home-town club Venezia in January 2013 and has contributed significantly to the team's promotion to Lega Pro Prima Divisione. On 16 June 2013 he scored 2 goals in the second leg of the playoff final against Monza, levelling the score on the 50th minute and then again on the 85th minute of the match. He then set up D'Appolonia for the third goal on 95 minutes that secured Venezia's victory and promotion. On 19 July 2013 he joined Venezia in co-ownership deal in 2-year contract. In June 2014 Inter bought back Bocalon.

=== Prato ===
In August 2014, Bocalon joined Prato from Inter Milan for the partnership agreement between the two clubs.

=== Alessandria ===
In June 2015, Alessandria bought the player for €300,000 fee; Bocalon signed a three-year contract.

=== Salernitana ===
On 31 July 2017, Bocalon was transferred to Salernitana in a definitive deal. He signed a three-year contract. He was assigned the number 24 shirt.

=== Return to Venezia ===
On 31 January 2019, he returned to Venezia, signing a 3.5-year contract. In the 2020–21 Serie B promotion play-offs, he scored the decisive goal in added time of the second leg against Cittadella that secured Venezia's promotion to Serie A. However, he did not make any appearances in Serie A for Venezia in the 2021–22 season.

==== Loan to Pordenone ====
On 15 January 2020, he joined Serie B club Pordenone on loan with an option to buy.

=== Trento ===
On 4 February 2022, Bocalon moved to Trento in Serie C.

=== Mantova ===
On 11 January 2023, Bocalon signed with Mantova.
