= Davide Bertolucci =

Italian footballer (born 1988)

Personal information
- Date of birth: 29 September 1988 (age 38)
- Place of birth: Bagno a Ripoli, Italy
- Height: 1.73 m (5 ft 8 in)
- Position: Left-back

Senior career*
| Years | Team | Apps | (Gls) |
| 2006–2009 | Sangiovannese | 29 | (1) |
| 2006–2007 | → Colligiana (loan) | 34 | (1) |
| 2008 | → Colligiana (loan) | 15 | (1) |
| 2009–2012 | Verona | 2 | (0) |
| 2010–2011 | → Viareggio (loan) | 25 | (0) |
| 2012 | → Taranto (loan) | 8 | (0) |
| 2012–2014 | Venezia | 56 | (0) |
| 2014–2015 | Cosenza | 5 | (0) |
| 2015 | Pordenone | 19 | (0) |
| 2015–2016 | FeralpiSalò | 23 | (0) |
| 2016–2017 | Ghivizzano Borgo a Mozzano | 24 | (0) |
| 2017–2022 | Tuttocuoio | 98 | (3) |

International career
| 2008–2009 | Italy U20 Lega Pro | 6 | (0) |
- * Club domestic league appearances and goals as of 17 October 2026

Davide Bertolucci (born 29 September 1988) is an Italian footballer who plays as a left back.

== Biography ==
=== Sangiovannese ===
Born in Bagno a Ripoli, the Province of Florence, Bertolucci started his professional career at Sangiovannese. He made his league debut on 21 May 2006, the first leg of promotion playoffs of 2005–06 Serie C1. In the next season he played for Colligiana, winning Eccellenza Tuscany. He returned to Sangiovannese in mid-2007 but re-signed by Colligiana in December 2007. Despite losing in the 2007–08 Serie D promotion playoffs, the team promoted to filled the vacancy in Lega Pro Seconda Divisione. Co-currently, Sangiovannese relegated to Seconda Divisione that season. Bertolucci became a regular starter of Sangiovannese in 2008–09 season, played 27 times.

=== Verona ===
On 7 August 2009 he was signed by Prima Divisione side Verona in co-ownership deal. He only played once, on 10 January 2010. However, he played in both legs of the promotion playoffs, as losing semi-finalists. On 5 July 2010 he was loaned to fellow Prima Divisione team Viareggio along with Leonardo Massoni. He played 25 times in the regular season and played once in relegation playoffs. He also started in the first two matches of the cup.

At the end of season Verona and Sangiovannese failed to agree the price of the remain 50% registration rights, which both clubs had to submit its price to Lega Pro. On 29 June 2011 Lega Pro announced that Verona was the highest bidder. Bertolucci failed to play any game in 2011–12 Serie B. In January 2012 Bertolucci left for Taranto.

=== Cosenza ===
On 11 July 2014, he was signed as a free agent for Cosenza on a one-year contract, which had the option of being extended. But, in January after played only 5 matches, he was sold to Pordenone.

=== Representative team ===
Bertolucci was selected to Italy U-20 Lega Pro in 2008–09 Mirop Cup.
