= André Viapiana =

Brazilian footballer (born 1981)

Personal information
- Full name: André Fabião Viapiana
- Date of birth: 15 March 1981 (age 45)
- Place of birth: São Paulo, Brazil
- Height: 1.74 m (5 ft 8 1/2 in)
- Position: Midfielder

Team information
- Current team: Reggiana

Senior career*
Years	Team	Apps	(Gls)
2007	Bragantino		
2007	15 de Novembro		
2007	CRB	1	(0)
2008–2009	AC Lugano	13	(1)
2009–	Reggiana	78	(7)
- * Club domestic league appearances and goals as of 23 January 2012

André Fabião Viapiana, also known as André Chu (born 15 March 1981), is a Brazilian footballer who plays for Reggiana.

André Viapiana played for Bragantino, 15 de Novembro, and CRB in 2007, before moving to Swiss club AC Lugano in February 2008.
