= Giuseppe Alessi (footballer) =

Italian footballer (born 1973)

Personal information
- Date of birth: 29 December 1973 (age 52)
- Place of birth: Turin, Italy
- Height: 1.71 m (5 ft 7 1/2 in)
- Position: Midfielder

Youth career
- Torino

Senior career*
Years	Team	Apps	(Gls)
1998–1999	Torino	0	(0)
1998–1999	→ Savoia (loan)	31	(3)
1999–2002	Napoli	12	(0)
2000–2001	→ Livorno (loan)	32	(5)
2002–2007	Spezia	123	(14)
2007–2016	Reggiana	200	(46)
- * Club domestic league appearances and goals as of 07:31, 4 January 2010 (UTC)

Giuseppe Alessi (born 29 December 1973) is an Italian former footballer who played as a midfielder. Alessi started his career at Torino. Then he played for S.S.C. Napoli, before joining Spezia Calcio.

== Honours ==
- Serie C1: 2006
- Serie C2: 2008
