= Cristian Sosa =

Uruguayan footballer (born 1985)

Personal information
- Full name: Cristian Nicolás Sosa De Luca
- Date of birth: 19 February 1985 (age 41)
- Place of birth: Montevideo, Uruguay
- Height: 1.81 m (5 ft 11 in)
- Position: Defender

Team information
- Current team: Real Casalnuovo
- Number: 19

Senior career*
Years	Team	Apps	(Gls)
2006–2010	Defensor Sporting	6	(0)
2006	→ Plaza Colonia (loan)		
2008–2009	→ Taranto (loan)	21	(1)
2009–2010	→ Gallipoli (loan)	34	(3)
2010	FCM Târgu Mureş	4	(1)
2011–2012	Taranto	42	(0)
2012–2013	Cittadella	48	(2)
2014	Venezia	14	(1)
2014–2017	Alessandria	101	(3)
2017	Modena	5	(0)
2017–2019	Fano	58	(1)
2019–2020	Sicula Leonzio	27	(0)
2020–2021	Livorno	23	(0)
2021–2023	Arzachena	7	(0)
2023–	Real Casalnuovo	0	(0)
- * Club domestic league appearances and goals as of 7 November 2021

Cristian Nicolás Sosa De Luca (Note: In this Spanish name, the first or paternal surname is Sosa and the second or maternal family name is De Luca.) (born 19 February 1985), known as Cristian Sosa, is a Uruguayan footballer who plays for Italian club Real Casalnuovo, mainly as a right defender.

== Career ==
Early in his career, played for the Uruguayan clubs Defensor Sporting and Plaza Colonia. However, he did not get enough match practice (in the "Violetas" he played only six matches in the national championship), and the summer of 2008 he moved to Italy to play for Taranto.

After playing a season in the Serie C1, he was transferred to the Serie B club Gallipoli, for which he played 34 games until 2010. His team entered a huge crisis and was relegated to Serie C.

In September 2010, Sosa was transferred to the Romanian Liga I side FCM Târgu Mureş as a free agent, after his previous team went bankrupt.

In early 2011, he returned to Taranto playing in the Serie C1. Playing regularly in the first team, twice participated in the playoffs for an exit to Serie B, but both times the team did not manage to upgrade to business class.

In mid-2012, after his team Taranto went bankrupt, he agreed a new deal with Serie B side Cittadella. On 25 September 2012, he scored his first goal in the 2–2 draw match against Livorno.

In January 2014 he goes to Venezia; since the summer of the same year he played for Alessandria, where he became captain in the 2016–17 season.

On 16 July 2019, he signed a contract with Sicula Leonzio for one year with an option for another year.

On 16 August 2021, he signed with Arzachena in Serie D.
