= Elia Ballardini =

Italian footballer (born 1991)

Personal information
- Full name: Elia Davide Ballardini
- Date of birth: 25 December 1991 (age 34)
- Place of birth: Stockholm, Sweden
- Height: 1.80 m (5 ft 11 in)
- Position: Midfielder

Team information
- Current team: Forlì

Youth career
- Cesena

Senior career*
Years	Team	Apps	(Gls)
2010–2013	Cesena	0	(0)
2010–2011	→ Bellaria (loan)	20	(0)
2011–2012	→ Carrarese (loan)	7	(1)
2012	→ Andria (loan)	2	(0)
2013–2014	Entella	12	(0)
2014–2015	Santarcangelo	11	(0)
2015–2018	Ravenna	85	(12)
2018	Forlì	4	(0)
2018–2019	Scandicci	13	(0)
2019–	Forlì	11	(0)
- * Club domestic league appearances and goals as of 19:24, 30 November 2019 (UTC)

Elia Davide Ballardini (born 25 December 1991) is an Italian footballer who plays as a midfielder for Forlì in the Serie D.

His father is football coach Davide Ballardini.

== Biography ==
Born in Stockholm, capital of Sweden, Elia Ballardini started his career at A.C. Cesena. He was signed by Bellaria – Igea Marina and A.S. Andria BAT in temporary deals. On 14 January 2013 he was signed by Virtus Entella along with Sasha Cori. In 2014 the club promoted to Serie B.
