= Yuri Korablin =

Russian politician

Yuri Vadimovich Korablin (Russian: Юрий Вадимович Кораблин; 30 January 1960 – 20 September 2016) was a Russian businessman, investor, and politician, born in Moscow. The former mayor of Khimki, Korablin, became the owner of the Italian football club Unione Venezia in February 2011.
