= Antonio Gammone =

Italian footballer (born 1993)

Personal information
- Date of birth: 31 January 1993 (age 33)
- Place of birth: Venosa, Italy
- Height: 1.98 m (6 ft 6 in)
- Position: Forward

Youth career
- –2011: Bari

Senior career*
| Years | Team | Apps | (Gls) |
| 2011–2015 | Bari | 0 | (0) |
| 2011–2012 | → Chieti (loan) | 27 | (1) |
| 2012–2014 | → Como (loan) | 38 | (4) |
| 2014–2015 | → Juve Stabia (loan) | 0 | (0) |
| 2015–2016 | Matera | 15 | (1) |
| 2016–2017 | Melfi | 25 | (1) |
| 2017–2019 | Sicula Leonzio | 61 | (1) |

International career
| 2008–2009 | Italy U17 | 8 | (0) |
| 2010 | Italy U18 | 1 | (0) |
- * Club domestic league appearances and goals as of 5 May 2019

Antonio Gammone (born 31 January 1993) is an Italian footballer.

== Biography ==
Born in Venosa, Basilicata, Gammone started his career at Apulian club Bari. He was the member of U14 team in 2006–07 season.

Gammone received national U17 call-up in 2008–09 season as one of the few youngest player. He played twice in 2009 UEFA European Under-17 Football Championship qualification and also twice in elite qualification. However, he missed the 2009 FIFA U-17 World Cup and did not take part in 2010 UEFA European Under-17 Football Championship qualification. Gammone also played for both reserve team and Bari U17 in 2009–10 season. He received his first and last U18 call-up in May 2010.

After spending his second season with Bari reserve in 2010–11 season, Gammone left for his first professional club Chieti. He played 27 games in 2011–12 Lega Pro Seconda Divisione. In July 2012 Gammone received a call-up to the pre-season camp of Bari, however on 18 July he left for Como in temporary deal. On 19 June 2013 Como excised the option to purchase half of the registration rights for a peppercorn of €500.

On 20 June 2014 Bari bought back Gammone. On 23 August 2014 he was signed by Juve Stabia in a temporary deal.

In summer 2015 he was signed by Matera.
