= Davide D'Appolonia =

Italian footballer (born 1993)

Personal information
- Date of birth: 3 December 1993 (age 32)
- Place of birth: Venice, Italy
- Position: Forward

Team information
- Current team: Campodarsego

Youth career
- Venezia

Senior career*
Years	Team	Apps	(Gls)
2011–2014	Venezia	37	(10)
2014–2015	Vicenza	0	(0)
2014–2015	→ Savoia (loan)	26	(1)
2015–2016	Forlì	26	(5)
2016–2017	Campodarsego	30	(8)
2017–2018	Matelica	29	(10)
2018–2019	Crema	29	(7)
2019–	Campodarsego	5	(1)
- * Club domestic league appearances and goals as of 22:06, 15 October 2019 (UTC)

Davide D'Appolonia (born 3 December 1993) is an Italian footballer who plays as a forward for A.C.D. Campodarsego in Serie D.

== Biography ==
On 28 August 2014 D'Appolonia and Mauro Vigorito were signed by Vicenza from Venezia. On 1 September D'Appolonia and Miloš Malivojević were signed by Savoia in temporary deals. In summer 2015 he was released after he was excluded from pre-season camp.
