= Renato Ballardini =

Italian politician and Resistance member (1927–2025)

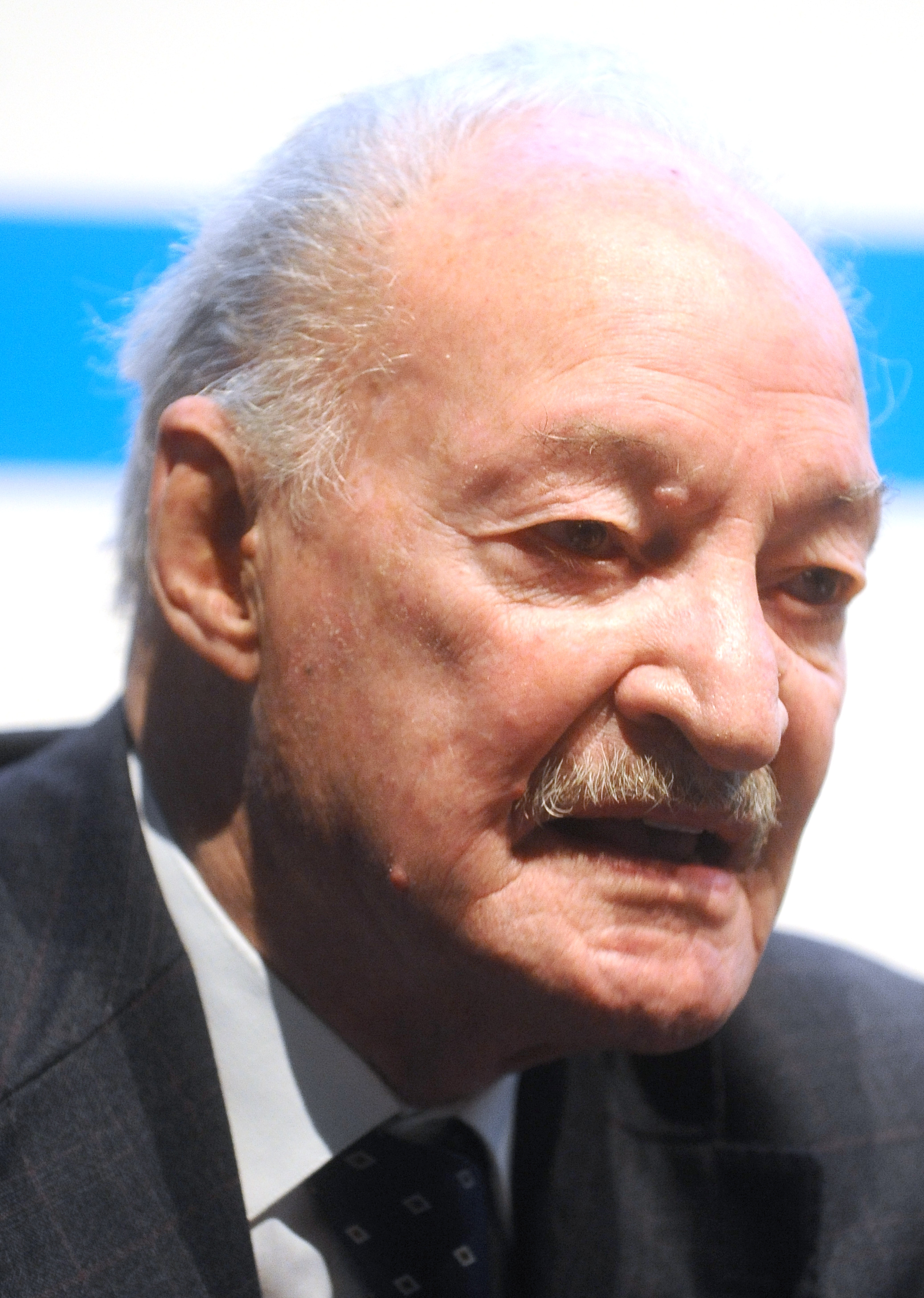
- Ballardini in 2015

Member of the Chamber of Deputies
- In office 1958–1979

Personal details
- Born: 21 October 1927 Riva del Garda, Italy
- Died: 15 February 2025 (aged 97) Riva del Garda, Italy
- Profession: Politician, lawyer

Renato Ballardini (21 October 1927 – 15 February 2025) was an Italian politician and lawyer, and during the Second World War, a member of the Italian Resistance.

Ballardini died on 15 February 2025, at the age of 97.

== Biography ==
During the War of Liberation, he joined the Italian resistance movement. After earning a law degree, he began a career as a lawyer.

While still a very young high school student, he joined the partisan brigade formed in his hometown, Riva del Garda, led by Gastone Franchetti, which included numerous students from the high school. This brigade was brutally massacred by the Nazi-Fascist occupation forces at dawn on June 28, 1944 (the Riva del Garda Massacre) or taken prisoner and tortured. Renato Ballardini was not captured because he had taken refuge in the mountains; instead, his father Remo was imprisoned, and he was released in poor health, so much so that he died a few days after his release.

These events left an indelible mark on the young Renato’s ideals, becoming a key to understanding his civic, political, and professional commitment.

He served as a member of parliament from 1958 to 1979. From January 21, 1964, to January 1, 1965, he was vice president of the Italian Socialist Party. In 1981, he was expelled from the party due to disagreements with Bettino Craxi.

In 1983, he was elected to the Regional Council of Trentino-Alto Adige/Südtirol and the Council of the Autonomous Province of Trento as a member of the Italian Communist Party. He resigned in 1986.
