= Gaetano Capogrosso =

Italian footballer

Personal information
- Date of birth: 11 June 1989 (age 37)
- Place of birth: Villaricca, Italy
- Height: 1.80 m (5 ft 11 in)
- Position: Right back

Team information
- Current team: Siziano Lanterna

Youth career
- Siena

Senior career*
| Years | Team | Apps | (Gls) |
| 2009–2014 | Siena | 0 | (0) |
| 2009–2010 | → Piacenza (loan) | 9 | (0) |
| 2010–2011 | → Gubbio (loan) | 17 | (0) |
| 2011 | → Ascoli (loan) | 4 | (0) |
| 2011–2013 | → Pavia (loan) | 56 | (2) |
| 2013–2014 | → Bellaria–Igea (loan) | 12 | (0) |
| 2014 | → Torres (loan) | 7 | (0) |
| 2014–2015 | Pordenone | 10 | (0) |
| 2015 | Venezia | 18 | (0) |
| 2015–2016 | Mestre | 16 | (2) |
| 2016–2018 | Delta Rovigo | 53 | (3) |
| 2018 | Treviso | | |
| 2018–2019 | Milano City | 21 | (2) |
| 2019– | Siziano Lanterna | | |
- * Club domestic league appearances and goals

Gaetano Capogrosso (born 11 June 1989) is an Italian footballer who plays for ASD Siziano Lanterna.

== Biography ==
Born in Villaricca, the Province of Naples, Campania, Capogrosso started his career at Tuscan club Siena. From 2009 to 2010 season to 2012–13 season he spent his professional career in Serie B and Lega Pro Prima Divisione (Italian second and third division respectively) in temporary deals. Capogrosso signed a 5-year contract with Siena on 1 July 2009. On 2 September 2013 fourth division club Bellaria – Igea Marina signed Capogrosso. In January 2014 he moved to Torres.

Capogrosso was the reserve member of Italy national under-20 football team in 2009 Mediterranean Games after Luca Marrone withdrew from the reserve list due to injury; both players did not enter the final squad.

On 16 July 2014 he was signed by Lega Pro club Pordenone. On 13 January 2015 Capogrosso and Maurizio Peccarisi moved to Venezia, with Raffaele Franchini and Emanuele Panzeri moved to opposite direction.

In October 2019, Capogrosso joined ASD Siziano Lanterna.
