= Daniele Giorico =

Italian footballer (born 1992)

Personal information
- Date of birth: 1 January 1992 (age 34)
- Place of birth: Alghero, Italy
- Height: 1.78 m (5 ft 10 in)
- Position: Midfielder

Team information
- Current team: Torres
- Number: 5

Youth career
- 2010–2011: Cagliari

Senior career*
Years	Team	Apps	(Gls)
2011–2012	Treviso	38	(3)
2012–2015	Cagliari	0	(0)
2012–2013	→ Lumezzane (loan)	30	(1)
2013–2014	→ Venezia (loan)	21	(1)
2015	→ Venezia (loan)	11	(0)
2015–2017	Modena	65	(3)
2017–2019	Carpi	7	(0)
2019	→ Virtus Verona (loan)	20	(0)
2019–2022	Triestina	75	(5)
2022–2023	Pordenone	27	(0)
2023–	Torres	86	(1)
- * Club domestic league appearances and goals as of 30 April 2026

Daniele Giorico (born 1 January 1992) is an Italian professional footballer who plays as a midfielder for Serie C Group B club Torres.

== Club career ==
On 10 January 2019, he joined Virtus Verona on loan until June 2020.

On 17 July 2019, he signed a two-year contract with Triestina.

On 19 July 2022, Giorico joined Pordenone on a two-year contract.

== Career statistics ==
Year	Competition	Apps	Goal
2012-	Serie C1	7	1
2011-2012	Serie C2	37	3
2010-2011	Campionato Nazionale Primavera	22	5
Total		66	9
