= Antonio Magli =

Italian footballer (born 1991)

Personal information
- Date of birth: 5 March 1991 (age 35)
- Place of birth: Orzinuovi, Italy
- Height: 1.86 m (6 ft 1 in)
- Position: Defender

Team information
- Current team: Ponte San Pietro

Youth career
- Brescia

Senior career*
Years	Team	Apps	(Gls)
2010–2014	Brescia	13	(0)
2010–2011	→ Como (loan)	21	(0)
2012	→ Frosinone (loan)	4	(0)
2013–2014	→ FeralpiSalò (loan)	39	(3)
2014–2015	Cosenza	30	(3)
2015–2017	AlbinoLeffe	47	(2)
2017	Lucchese	15	(0)
2018–2019	Fano	43	(0)
2019–2021	Renate	18	(0)
2021–2022	Giana Erminio	28	(0)
2022	Chievo Sona	5	(0)
2022–2023	Seregno	19	(2)
2023–	Ponte San Pietro	6	(0)
- * Club domestic league appearances and goals as of 4 October 2023

Antonio Magli (born 5 March 1991) is an Italian footballer who plays as a defender for Serie D club Ponte San Pietro.

== Club career ==
=== Brescia ===
Born in Orzinuovi, in the Province of Brescia, Lombardy region, Magli started his career at Brescia. On 22 July 2010 Magli joined Lega Pro Prime Division club Como, in a co-ownership deal for a peppercorn fee of €250. In June 2011 Magli was bought back for €10,000.

Magli made his Serie B debut for Brescia in 2011–12 Serie B season. In January 2012 he was signed by Frosinone in a temporary deal.

He failed to play any game for Brescia in 2012–13 Serie B season. In January 2013 he was signed by FeralpiSalò in a temporary deal. In summer 2013 the Lega Pro club signed him in a co-ownership deal for a peppercorn of €50. In June 2014 Magli was bought back again for just €250 in a 1-year contract.

=== Cosenza ===
On 7 July 2014 Magli was signed by Cosenza.

=== AlbinoLeffe ===
On 5 August 2015 Magli was signed by AlbinoLeffe., one day after the club was admitted to 2015–16 Lega Pro to fill the vacancies.

=== Renate ===
On 4 July 2019, he joined Renate on a 2-year contract.

=== Giana Erminio ===
On 19 July 2021, Magli signed for Giana Erminio.
