= Davide Carcuro =

Italian footballer (born 1987)

Personal information
- Date of birth: 28 May 1987 (age 39)
- Place of birth: Treviso, Italy
- Height: 1.84 m (6 ft 0 in)
- Position: Midfielder

Team information
- Current team: Ponzano Calcio

Youth career
- Treviso
- 2006–2007: Fiorentina

Senior career*
Years	Team	Apps	(Gls)
2007–2009	Fiorentina	0	(0)
2007–2008	→ Lanciano (loan)	10	(0)
2008–2009	→ Treviso (loan)	0	(0)
2009	→ Crotone (loan)	13	(0)
2009–2011	Salernitana	49	(4)
2011–2014	Ternana	76	(4)
2014–2015	Venezia	20	(2)
2015–2016	Pro Patria	11	(0)
2016	Rimini	16	(1)
2016–2017	Prato	17	(2)
2017–2018	ASD Liventina	15	(0)
2018–2019	ASD Lovispresiano		
2019–	Ponzano Calcio		
- * Club domestic league appearances and goals as of 01:25, 9 November 2019 (UTC)

Davide Carcuro (born 28 May 1987) is an Italian footballer who plays as a midfielder for Ponzano Calcio.

== Career ==
=== Fiorentina ===
On 31 August 2006, Carcuro joined Fiorentina in temporary deal. He was the fourth player signed from Treviso that season, namely Massimo Gobbi (€4.3M, half of the rights also held by Cagliari) and Reginaldo (€1M via Udinese) and Francesco Parravicini (€2.7M, but in July left for Palermo). Treviso signed Gianni Guigou for €40,000 in exchange. In January 2007 the deal changed to a co-ownership deal, for €1 million. He signed a contract until 30 June 2011.

After a season in La Viola's Primavera under-20 team, Carcuro was loaned to Lanciano. On 1 September 2006 he returned to Treviso after no team willing to borrow him. However, he did not play any game in 2008–09 Serie B before joined third division club Crotone in January 2009. Carcuro won the promotion playoffs with Crotone in June and promoted back to Serie B for just a season. In late June both club failed to agree the price of the remain 50% registration rights, thus both club had to submit a bid to Lega Calcio in a sealed envelope. Eventually Treviso won the closed tender for €60,000. However Treviso bankrupted in July 2009. Before bankruptcy, Marcos Miranda moved to Fiorentina for €250,000 in exchange.

=== Salernitana ===
As FIGC allowed players from the bankrupted teams to become a free agent, Carcuro joined another Serie B club Salernitana. The club relegated after the 2009–10 Serie B. Carcuro also suspended 6 games (later reduced to 4 games) since round 40 of 2009–10 season, and the first match of 2010–11 Lega Pro Prima Divisione. He was sent off in round 39 (on 10 May 2010) against AlbinoLeffe.

=== Ternana ===
After Salernitana also bankrupted, Carcuro joined Ternana of the third division in 1-year contract. The club promoted as one of the group winner of 2011–12 Lega Pro Prima Divisione.

On 25 May 2012, along with Crocefisso Miglietta, they signed new contracts with club.

== Later career ==
Ahead of the 2019–20 season, Carcuro joined Ponzano Calcio.

== Honours ==
- Lega Pro Prima Divisione: 2012
