= Sacha Cori =

Italian footballer

Personal information
- Date of birth: 12 May 1989 (age 37)
- Place of birth: Viterbo, Italy
- Height: 1.89 m (6 ft 2 in)
- Position: Forward

Team information
- Current team: Pietralunghese

Youth career
- –2008: Ternana

Senior career*
Years	Team	Apps	(Gls)
2007–2010	Ternana	6	(0)
2008–2009	→ Isola Liri (loan)	25	(3)
2010	→ Sangiovannese (loan)	12	(3)
2010–2016	Cesena	0	(0)
2010–2012	→ Carrarese (loan)	53	(16)
2012–2013	→ Empoli (loan)	8	(1)
2013	→ Entella (loan)	12	(1)
2013–2014	→ Venezia (loan)	23	(6)
2014–2015	→ Cosenza (loan)	29	(5)
2015–2016	→ Arezzo (loan)	16	(3)
2016	→ Siena (loan)	12	(1)
2016–2017	Santarcangelo	35	(10)
2017–2019	Monza	42	(10)
2019	→ AlbinoLeffe (loan)	16	(7)
2019–2023	AlbinoLeffe	84	(17)
2023	Alessandria	13	(1)
2023–2024	Livorno	22	(5)
2024–2025	Anzio	31	(6)
2025–	Pietralunghese		
- * Club domestic league appearances and goals as of 2 November 2025

Sacha Cori (born 12 May 1989) is an Italian footballer who plays for Eccellenza club Pietralunghese.

== Career ==
=== Ternana ===
Born in Viterbo, Lazio region, Cori started his career at Umbrian team Ternana. He made his league debut on 19 November 2006, replacing Salvatore Russo. In the next season he played twice in the league, on 1 November 2007 and on 17 February 2008. He graduated from the under-20 youth team in 2008 and loaned to Lega Pro Seconda Divisione and Lazio side Isola Liri, scored 3 league goals. He returned to Terni on 1 July 2009 but only played once in the first half of 2009–10 Lega Pro Prima Divisione (on 31 January). On 1 February 2010 he was loaned to Lega Pro second division side Sangiovannese, which he was linked to the club since the opening of the transfer window. He played the first two rounds of 2010–11 Lega Pro Prima Divisione and one of the two matches of 2010–11 Coppa Italia for Ternana, but was signed by Serie A team Cesena for free along with Luis Jiménez (loan for €1M) on 31 August.

=== Cesena ===
Cori was immediately loaned back to lower division side Carrarese. He scored 10 league goals as team second scorer (behind Lega Pro Second Division regular season top-scorer, team-mate Antonio Gaeta), winning the promotion playoffs. He played 3 substitute appearances in the playoffs, as the coach preferred Pera–Gaeta–Merini in his 4–3–3/4–5–1 formation.

On 12 July 2011 Carrarese signed him in co-ownership deal for a peppercorn of €500 Carrarese also borrowed Elia Ballardini from Cesena.

In June 2012 Cesena bought back Cori for €200,000 and renewed his contract to 30 June 2015. He was loaned to fellow Serie B club Empoli.

On 20 August 2013 he was signed by third-level club Venezia on a temporary deal.

On 2 July 2014 Cori left for Cosenza on a temporary deal. The club had option to sign him outright, despite Cesena also had a counter-option.

On 8 July 2015 he was signed by Arezzo on a temporary deal.

On 1 February 2016 he was signed by Siena on a temporary deal.

=== Santarcangelo and Monza ===
On 5 July 2016 he was signed by Santarcangelo in a definitive deal. On 18 July 2017 Cori was signed by Monza.

On 9 January 2019, he joined AlbinoLeffe on loan.

=== Albinoleffe ===
On 5 July 2019, he joined AlbinoLeffe on a permanent basis.

=== Alessandria ===
On 16 January 2023, Cori moved to Alessandria.

== Honours ==
=== Club ===
Cosenza Calcio

- Coppa Italia Lega Pro: 2014–15
