= Nicola Capellini =

Italian football midfielder

Personal information
- Date of birth: 24 February 1991 (age 35)
- Place of birth: Cesena, Italy
- Height: 1.84 m (6 ft 0 in)
- Position: Attacking midfielder

Team information
- Current team: Cesena
- Number: 32

Youth career
- –2009: Cesena
- 2009–2011: Bologna

Senior career*
Years	Team	Apps	(Gls)
2011–2013	Bologna	0	(0)
2011–2012	→ Valenzana (loan)	26	(2)
2012–2013	→ San Marino (loan)	16	(3)
2013–2015	Cesena	4	(0)
2014	→ Venezia (loan)	9	(0)
2014–2015	→ Forlì (loan)	8	(2)
2015–2016	Andria	16	(1)
2016–2017	Forlì	36	(4)
2017	Modena	6	(0)
2017–2018	Santarcangelo	23	(3)
2018–	Cesena	46	(2)
- * Club domestic league appearances and goals as of 23 February 2020

Nicola Capellini (born 24 February 1991) is an Italian football midfielder who plays for Cesena.

== Career ==
On 31 August 2012 Capellini left for San Marino Calcio in a temporary deal.

On 13 June 2013 Capellini was re-signed by A.C. Cesena in a 3-year deal. On 3 January 2014 he was signed by Venezia in another temporary deal.

On 12 July 2014 he was signed by Forlì in another temporary deal.

On 16 July 2015 he signed a one-year deal, with option for a 2nd year, with Andria.

In the summer 2016 he signed for Forlì.

In July 2019 he signed with Cesena and helped them achieve promotion to Serie C.
