= Andrea Marconi =

Italian footballer (born 1985)

Personal information
- Date of birth: 24 May 1985 (age 41)
- Place of birth: Milan, Italy
- Height: 1.76 m (5 ft 9 1/2 in)
- Position: Defender

Team information
- Current team: Folgore Caratese

Youth career
- –2002: Aldini
- 2002–2004: Milan

Senior career*
Years	Team	Apps	(Gls)
2004–2010	Pergocrema	111	(10)
2010–2015	Pro Vercelli	80	(5)
2013	→ Venezia (loan)	9	(1)
2015	→ Como (loan)	19	(0)
2015–2017	Como	72	(2)
2017–	Folgore Caratese	7	(0)
- * Club domestic league appearances and goals as of 30 November 2017

Andrea Marconi (born 24 May 1985) is an Italian footballer who plays for Italian club Folgore Caratese.

== Biography ==
=== Youth career ===
Born in Milan, Lombardy, Marconi started his career at Milanese club Aldini. In July 2002, along with 5 other youth players, they were signed by one of the two Serie A club of Milan city – A.C. Milan. Marconi was the member of the under-18 youth team in 2002–03 season; he was promoted to the under-20 reserve in 2003–04.

=== Pergocrema ===
In 2004 Marconi left for Serie D (fifth division; non-professional) club Pergocrema, where he won promotion to 2005–06 Serie C2 as well as promotion to 2008–09 Lega Pro Prima Divisione.

=== Pro Vercelli ===
In 2010 Marconi was signed by Pro Vercelli in co-ownership deal, where he won promotion to 2011–12 Lega Pro Prima Divisione. In June 2011 the club acquired Marconi outright in 2-year contract. The club won promotion again to 2012–13 Serie B.

After only 6 appearances in the second division, on 23 January 2013 Marconi joined the fourth division club Venezia. Marconi won promotion back to Serie B again with Pro Vercelli in 2014. He wore no.2 shirt for the new season. However, he failed to play any more Serie B game. On 26 January 2015 Marconi was signed by Calcio Como in another temporary deal. Marconi started in the first 2 games of promotion playoffs. He was an unused bench against Matera in the second leg.
