= Francesco Rampi =

Italian footballer

Personal information
- Date of birth: 20 January 1991 (age 35)
- Place of birth: Foligno, Italy
- Height: 1.84 m (6 ft 0 in)
- Position: Midfielder

Senior career*
| Years | Team | Apps | (Gls) |
| 2009–2010 | Castel Rigone | 30 | (4) |
| 2010–2012 | Perugia | 23 | (0) |
| 2011–2012 | → Livorno (loan) | 13 | (0) |
| 2012–2013 | Foligno | 23 | (1) |
| 2013–2016 | Reggiana | 42 | (1) |
| 2013–2015 | → Monza (loan) | 2 | (0) |
| 2016–2017 | Carrarese | 20 | (0) |
- * Club domestic league appearances and goals

Francesco Rampi (born 20 January 1991) is an Italian professional footballer who plays as a midfielder.

== Career ==
Born in Foligno, Umbria, Rampi made his professional debut for Livorno during the 2011–12 Serie B season. He previously played for Serie D clubs Castel Rigone and Perugia.

On 8 July 2013 Rampi was signed by Emilian club Reggiana in a two-year deal. On 1 September 2014 he was signed by fellow Lega Pro club Monza in a temporary deal. However, Monza was facing financial troubles, which terminated most of the player contracts. Rampi returned to Reggiana on 28 January 2015. On 20 July 2016, he was sold to Carrarese.
