= Stefano Fortunato =

Italian footballer

Personal information
- Date of birth: 15 January 1990 (age 36)
- Place of birth: Turin, Italy
- Height: 1.84 m (6 ft 1/2 in)
- Position: Goalkeeper

Youth career
- Montecchio Maggiore

Senior career*
Years	Team	Apps	(Gls)
2006–2009	Montecchio Maggiore	16	(0)
2008–2009	→ Parma (loan)	0	(0)
2009–2011	Pro Patria	0	(0)
2011–2012	Modena	1	(0)
2012–2013	Vicenza	0	(0)
2013–2015	Venezia	36	(0)
2016	Novara	0	(0)
2016–2017	South Tyrol	2	(0)
2017–2018	Vicenza	0	(0)
- * Club domestic league appearances and goals as of 26 May 2018

Stefano Fortunato (born 15 January 1990) is an Italian footballer who plays as a goalkeeper.

== Biography ==
Son of former footballer Daniele Fortunato, Fortunato started his career at Veneto club Montecchio Maggiore. Fortunato was selected by the Veneto Regional Allievi Representative Team in 2006. He made his senior debut in 2006–07 Serie D season. In August 2008, he was signed by Serie A club Parma. He was the backup of Andrea Gasparri in the "spring" under-20 league. In 2009, he left for Italian third tier club Pro Patria. In 2010–11 Lega Pro Seconda Divisione, Fortunato was the fourth keeper behind Luca Anania, Matteo Andreoletti and Andrea Sala.

In July 2011, he was signed by Serie B club Modena. He was the understudy of Nicholas Caglioni and Matteo Guardalben. He made his club debut in 2011–12 Coppa Italia against top division club Chievo. Both teams fielded an inferior squad, and Modena lost to the Veneto side 0–3. Fortunato also played for Modena "spring" in round 2 to 4, round 10, 15 and 17 as overage player. He wore no.88 shirt in the first team. Fortunato made his Serie B debut as sub on 20 May 2012.

In August 2012 he started to train with Vicenza Calcio. On 19 August Fortunato appeared for Vicenza as unused bench in 2012–13 Coppa Italia.

On 31 August 2013, he was signed by the third-tier club Venezia in 1-year contract.

After 8 months without a club, on 25 February 2016, Fortunato was signed by Novara. Arezzo also announced the signing of Fortunato on 9 June 2015. However, the deal did not materialize.

On 1 September 2016 Fortunato joined South Tyrol, replacing Achille Coser.

In 2017 Fortunato returned to Vicenza Calcio on a two-year contract.
