= Luca Cattaneo (footballer) =

Italian footballer (born 1989)

Personal information
- Date of birth: 30 January 1989 (age 37)
- Place of birth: Porlezza, Italy
- Height: 1.70 m (5 ft 7 in)
- Position: Midfielder

Team information
- Current team: SC Ligorna 1922
- Number: 16

Senior career*
Years	Team	Apps	(Gls)
2007–2008	Borgomanero	32	(6)
2008–2009	Pavia	9	(0)
2009–2014	Savona	114	(10)
2014–2015	Bassano	35	(7)
2015–2017	Pordenone	73	(13)
2017–2018	Brescia	2	(0)
2018	Reggiana	18	(4)
2018–2019	Novara	13	(1)
2019	→ Gubbio (loan)	11	(0)
2019–2020	Piacenza	20	(1)
2021–2022	Vibonese	40	(0)
2022	Cjarlins Muzane	13	(4)
2022–2023	Calcio Desenzano	17	(4)
2023–	SC Ligorna 1922	3	(0)
- * Club domestic league appearances and goals as of 24 September 2023

Luca Cattaneo (born 30 January 1989) is an Italian footballer. He plays as a midfielder for Serie D club SC Ligorna 1922.

== Club career ==
He made his Serie C debut for Savona on 1 September 2013 in a game against AlbinoLeffe.

On 31 January 2019, he joined Gubbio on loan.

On 11 July 2019, he signed a 2-year contract with Piacenza.

On 11 February 2021 he moved to Vibonese. After one and a half year at Vibonese, Cattaneo moved to fellow league club A.S.D. Cjarlins Muzane in July 2022.
