= Max Taddei =

Italian footballer Italian manager

Massimiliano Taddei
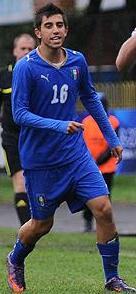

Personal information
- Date of birth: 18 April 1991 (age 35)
- Place of birth: Pontedera, Italy
- Height: 1.79 m (5 ft 10 1/2 in)
- Position: Midfielder

Team information
- Current team: A.S.D. Virtus Sanremese
- Number: 4

Youth career
- 2007–2011: Fiorentina

Senior career*
Years	Team	Apps	(Gls)
2009–2010	→ Gubbio (loan)	8	(0)
2011–2012	→ Carrarese (loan)	27	(0)
2012–2025	Venezia	0	(0)
2025-	A.S.D. Virtus Sanremese	4	(1)

International career^{‡}
2007	Italy U-16	3	(0)
2007–2008	Italy U-17	7	(0)
2009	Italy U-18	5	(0)
2009–	Italy U-19	6	(0)

Managerial career
- 2025-: U17 A.S.D. Virtus Sanremese
- * Club domestic league appearances and goals as of 15:17, 19 April 2010 (UTC) ‡ National team caps and goals as of 15:17, 19 April 2010 (UTC)

Massimiliano Taddei, also known as Max Taddei (born 18 April 1991) is an Italian professional football And an italian manager who plays for Prima Categoria club A.S.D. Virtus Sanremese, and managethe club U17 A.S.D. Virtus Sanremese

== Biography ==
On 18 August 2012 he goes on co-ownership to Venezia. On 21 June 2013 Venezia buy the other part property of Fiorentina.
