= Emanuele Panzeri =

Italian footballer (born 1993)

Personal information
- Date of birth: 31 March 1993 (age 33)
- Place of birth: Carate Brianza, Italy
- Position: Fullback

Youth career
- –2009: Legnano
- 2009–2012: Novara

Senior career*
Years	Team	Apps	(Gls)
2012–2013	Novara	1	(0)
2013	→ South Tyrol (loan)	1	(0)
2013–2015	Venezia	14	(0)
2015	Pordenone	5	(0)
- * Club domestic league appearances and goals

Emanuele Panzeri (born 31 March 1993) is an Italian footballer.

== Biography ==
Born in Carate Brianza, Lombardy, Panzeri started his career at Legnano. He then left for Novara. On 10 November 2012 he made his Serie B debut as a substitute of Masahudu Alhassan.

On 29 January 2013 Panzeri was signed by South Tyrol in a temporary deal.

In summer 2013 he was signed by Venezia. On 23 January 2015 Panzeri and Raffaele Franchini were signed by Pordenone, with Maurizio Peccarisi and Gaetano Capogrosso moved to opposite direction .

=== Representative teams ===
Panzeri was a member of Italy Lega Pro representative teams in 2013–15 International Challenge Trophy. He also played in a friendly match against Korea.
