= Salvatore Gallo (sculptor) =

Italian painter

Salvatore Gallo (1928-1996) was an Italian artist and sculptor who was recognized for his work in France and abroad.

== Early life ==
Gallo was born in 1928 in Vittoria, Sicily. He studied in Turin with Carlo Carra from 1946-49. In 1955, Gallo went to Mexico to study with David Siqueiros for two years.

In 1958, Gallo moved to New York, where he had his first major show at the Chiser Gallery. He then began a collaboration with his cousin Frank Gallo Professor of Art at Boston University. Upon, completing several major commissions together. they had a major exhibition of work in Tel Aviv, Israel. In 1964, Gallo moved to Paris.

In 1965, Gallo held his first major show at L’Academie Dufaux in Paris. At the same time, he took part in the Major exhibition “Art Fantastique” at the Langlois Gallery in Paris.

Gallo received major recognition when he exhibited his sculptures At the Italian Embassy in Paris and at the Musée National d'Art Moderne. In 1969 he participated in the exhibition "Since Rodin" where he was presented with the Medalle de bronze.

In 1970 he was honoured further in recognition of his work with the Medaille d’argent at the Biennale Internationale de Juvisy. in 1972 he won the Medaille d’ora at the Biennale Internationale de Juvisy, culminating with the honour Eme Grand Prix de Juan-les Pins. He started working at his new studio at La Maison des Artistes in the Nogent-sur-Marne commune in Paris.

== Awards and commissions from 1975–1996 ==
Medaille d’or au 14th Salon International de Paris Sud de Juvisy.

- 1975 Participated in the 50th anniversary of the group of de Grear at the Chateau de Montvillargenne. That same year, Salvatore and Frank Gallo worked on monument projects in Dallas, Texas and several sculptures for the Playboy Club nightclubs.
- 1976 Exposition in Aurillac and the Exposition at Clermont Ferrand.
- 1977 La couleur dans de Ville Espace Cardin Salon de Mai in Paris Also the Salon de ‘La Jeune Sculpture” Salon des Realities Nouvelles.
- 1978 Exhibition for Salon de Mai in Paris
- 1980 Commission Memorial de la Paix in bronze
- 1981 Commission for the family Libreville, Gabon
- 1983 to 1985 Commissions for the Salon Du Group Dor
- 1986 Commission for the Coppia Gabon - Le Couple Port Gentil
- 1988 Sculpture for Live Aid Afrique
- 1990 Private commission for the Salon Donatello
- 1995 Final exposition of key works for the Maison D`es Artistes

== La Creation ==
In 1991, Gallo started work on his sculpture "La Creation". It was carved from a 35-ton slab of granite quartz sandstone and pyrite. The stone was excavated by workers near Gallo's country home in Marchais-Beton, a former commune in the Yonne department.

In 1995, Gallo was commissioned to create three sculptures for the new A5 autoroute. However, Gallo was diagnosed with terminal cancer and was unable to complete the commission. In response, Jean Antoine Winghart, president of the Paris Rhine Autoroute, offered to buy “La Creation” for the midpoint position on the A5 Autoroute at Villeneuve-Archbishop Yonne. The Paris Rhine Autoroute paid 1.96 million Francs for the piece in 1996.

Gallo completed "La Creation" and positioned it on site one week before he died. It was officially unveiled on 21 June 1996, one week later.
