= Federico Maracchi =

Italian footballer

Personal information
- Date of birth: 5 June 1988 (age 38)
- Place of birth: Trieste, Italy
- Height: 1.86 m (6 ft 1 in)
- Position: Midfielder

Team information
- Current team: ASD Zaule Rabuiese

Youth career
- Triestina

Senior career*
| Years | Team | Apps | (Gls) |
| 2007–2008 | Triestina | 1 | (0) |
| 2008–2009 | Muggia | | |
| 2009–2010 | Manzanese | 36 | (4) |
| 2010–2011 | Tamai | 31 | (10) |
| 2011–2012 | Treviso | 28 | (4) |
| 2012–2014 | Venezia | 55 | (11) |
| 2014–2015 | Pordenone | 32 | (5) |
| 2015–2017 | FeralpiSalò | 49 | (7) |
| 2017–2018 | Trapani | 40 | (5) |
| 2018 | → Novara (loan) | 6 | (0) |
| 2018–2022 | Triestina | 79 | (9) |
| 2022– | ASD Zaule Rabuiese | 0 | (0) |
- * Club domestic league appearances and goals as of 1 July 2022

Federico Maracchi (born 5 June 1988) is an Italian footballer who plays as a midfielder for Eccellenza club ASD Zaule Rabuiese.

== Club career ==
He made his professional debut in the Serie B for Triestina in the 2007–08 season.

On 1 July 2022, Maracchi joined fifth-tier Eccellenza club ASD Zaule Rabuiese.
