= Andrea Cittadino =

Italian footballer (born 1994)

Personal information
- Date of birth: 25 April 1994 (age 32)
- Place of birth: Rome, Italy
- Height: 1.78 m (5 ft 10 in)
- Position: Midfielder

Team information
- Current team: Nissa

Youth career
- Roma

Senior career*
Years	Team	Apps	(Gls)
2013–2015	Feralpisalò	36	(1)
2015–2016	Alessandria	3	(0)
2016–2017	Melfi	17	(0)
2017	Mantova	11	(0)
2017–2019	Latina	65	(12)
2019–2020	Foggia	23	(5)
2020–2021	Bisceglie	26	(7)
2021–2022	Gubbio	28	(6)
2022–2023	Trento	11	(0)
2023	→ Potenza (loan)	11	(0)
2023–2025	Latina	27	(1)
2025–	Nissa	0	(0)

International career^{‡}
2011	Italy U18	1	(0)
- * Club domestic league appearances and goals as of 27 April 2025 ‡ National team caps and goals as of 20 October 2011

Andrea Cittadino (born 25 April 1994) is an Italian professional footballer who plays as a midfielder for Serie D club Nissa.

== Club career ==
Born in Rome, Cittadino made his footballer formation in local club A.S. Roma. He left Roma in 2013, and joined to Feralpisalò.

On the 2017–18 season, he signed with Serie D club Latina. He played three seasons in Serie D, the last one on the 2019–20 season for Foggia.

On 7 September 2021, he joined Serie C club Gubbio.

On 15 July 2022, Cittadino signed a two-year contract with Trento. On 17 January 2023, he joined Potenza on loan with an obligation to buy.

== International career ==
In 2011, Cittadino played a match for Italy U18 against Ukraine.
