= Dario Campagna =

Italian professional footballer (born 1988)

Personal information
- Full name: Dario Campagna
- Date of birth: 30 January 1988 (age 38)
- Place of birth: Turin, Italy
- Height: 1.80 m (5 ft 11 in)
- Position: Defender

Youth career
- Juventus

Senior career*
Years	Team	Apps	(Gls)
2008–2012	Verona	40	(0)
2012	→ Piacenza (loan)	9	(0)
2012–2014	Venezia	26	(0)
2014–2015	Arezzo	15	(0)
2015–2016	Cremonese	7	(0)
- * Club domestic league appearances and goals as of 26 July 2012 ‡ National team caps and goals as of 26 July 2012

Dario Campagna (born 30 January 1988) is an Italian professional footballer who is currently unattached.

== Club career ==
=== Juventus ===
Campagna began his footballing career within the youth ranks of Serie A powerhouse, Juventus FC He graduated from the Primavera Squadra in 2008. He did earn a few first team call-ups throughout the 2006–07 season, however, Campagna did not appear for the Juventus first team prior to his official transfer to Hellas Verona F.C. in July 2008.

=== Hellas Verona ===
On 5 July 2008, he joined Lega Pro Prima Divisione side, Hellas Verona. In his first season with the club, Campagna made 20 league appearances, however, in the following three seasons, he featured less sparingly, and in January 2012, Hellas Verona opted to loan the player out to the Lega Pro Prima Divisione with Piacenza Calcio. During his loan spell with Piacenza, Campagna made 8 league appearances, and returned to Verona on 30 June 2012, ahead of the 2012–13 Serie B campaign. He was ultimately sold to Venezia, following his return.
