= Nicola Lancini =

Italian footballer (born 1994)

Personal information
- Date of birth: 29 March 1994 (age 32)
- Place of birth: Chiari, Italy
- Height: 1.77 m (5 ft 10 in)
- Position: Defender

Team information
- Current team: Villa Valle
- Number: 13

Youth career
- –2012: Brescia

Senior career*
Years	Team	Apps	(Gls)
2012–2018	Brescia	9	(0)
2013–2014	→ Venezia (loan)	12	(1)
2014–2015	→ Carrarese (loan)	28	(0)
2016–2017	→ Bassano (loan)	5	(0)
2018	→ Fidelis Andria (loan)	12	(0)
2018–2019	Virtus Verona	9	(0)
2019–2020	Fermana	11	(0)
2021	Mestre	5	(0)
2021	Cavese	12	(0)
2021	Casatese	13	(1)
2021–2022	Sangiuliano City	14	(0)
2022–2023	Real Calepina	22	(1)
2023	Atletico Castegnato	9	(0)
2023–	Villa Valle	32	(1)

International career
2011–2012	Italy U-18	10	(0)
- * Club domestic league appearances and goals as of 21:07, 9 December 2024 (UTC)

Nicola Lancini (born 29 March 1994) is an Italian footballer who plays as a defender for Serie D club Villa Valle.

== Club career ==
On 2 September 2013, he was signed by Venezia on a one-year loan.

On 14 November 2019, he signed a contract with Serie C club Fermana until the end of the 2019–20 season.

On 2 September 2021, he moved to Casatese in Serie D.

On 30 December 2021, he joined to Serie D club Sangiuliano City.
