= Francesco Cernuto =

Italian footballer (born 1992)

Personal information
- Date of birth: 25 January 1992 (age 34)
- Place of birth: Milazzo, Italy
- Height: 1.80 m (5 ft 11 in)
- Position: Defender

Team information
- Current team: Paganese
- Number: 25

Youth career
- –2010: Reggina

Senior career*
| Years | Team | Apps | (Gls) |
| 2010–2014 | Reggina | 0 | (0) |
| 2010–2013 | → Treviso (loan) | 76 | (3) |
| 2013–2014 | → Venezia (loan) | 5 | (0) |
| 2014–2019 | Venezia | 81 | (1) |
| 2019–2021 | Triestina | 6 | (0) |
| 2021– | Paganese | 2 | (0) |
- * Club domestic league appearances and goals as of 7 February 2021

Francesco Cernuto (born 25 January 1992) is an Italian footballer who plays as a defender for Paganese.

== Club career ==
He made his Serie C debut for Treviso on 2 September 2012 in a game against Cuneo.

On 2 September 2019, he signed a 2-year contract with Triestina.

On 31 January 2021 he moved to Paganese.
