= Salvatore Gallo (footballer) =

Italian footballer

Personal information
- Date of birth: 20 August 1992 (age 34)
- Height: 1.76 m (5 ft 9 in)
- Position: Defensive midfielder

Team information
- Current team: Nuorese

Youth career
- Chievo

Senior career*
| Years | Team | Apps | (Gls) |
| 2012–2013 | Chievo | 0 | (0) |
| 2012–2013 | → Lumezzane (loan) | 17 | (0) |
| 2013–2014 | Venezia | 23 | (0) |
| 2014–2015 | Savoia | 16 | (0) |
| 2015 | Melfi | 14 | (0) |
| 2015 | Agropoli | 13 | (2) |
| 2015–2016 | Olbia | 14 | (0) |
| 2016– | Nuorese | 48 | (2) |
- * Club domestic league appearances and goals as of 6 March 2018

Salvatore Gallo (born 20 August 1992) is an Italian footballer who plays for Nuorese as a defensive midfielder.

In 2012, he was signed by Lumezzane.

In summer 2013 he was signed by Venezia in co-ownership deal. In June 2014 Chievo bought back Gallo.
