= Stadio Tullio Saleri =

Coordinates: 45°39′17″N 10°14′10″E

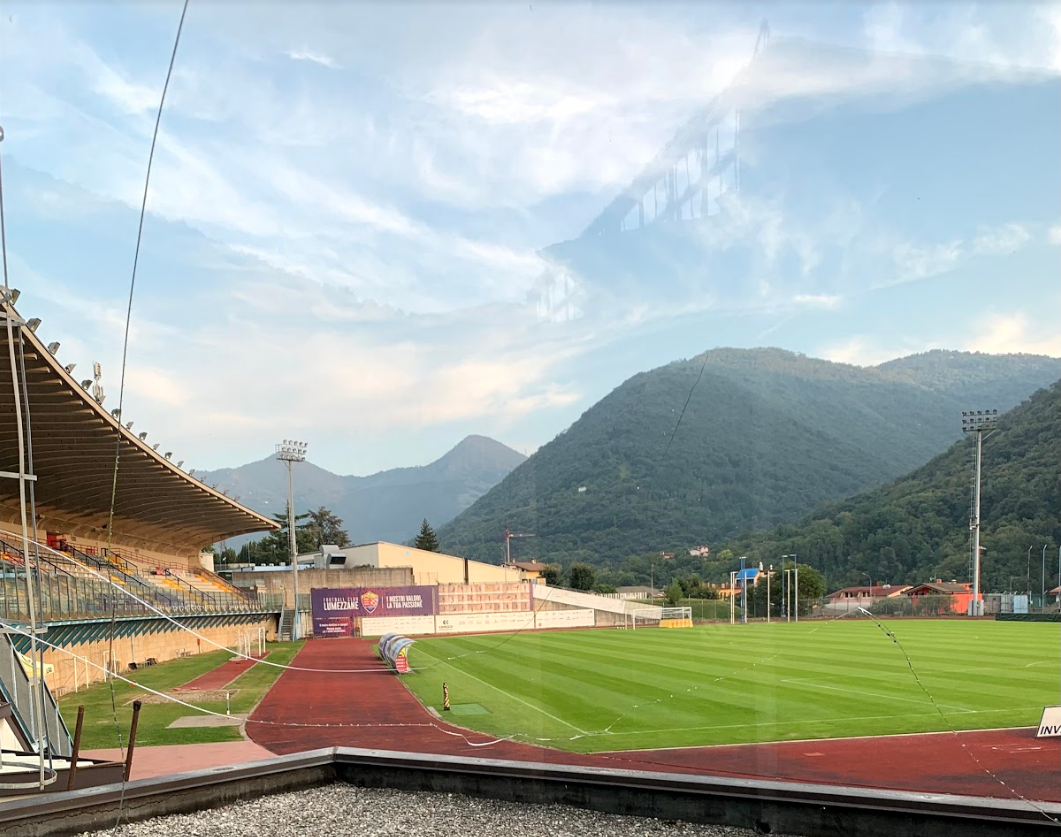

Stadio Tullio Saleri (formerly Nuovo Stadio Comunale) is a multi-use stadium in Lumezzane, Italy. It is currently used mostly for football matches and is the home ground of A.C. Lumezzane. The stadium holds 4,150. It is named for Tullio Saleri, a famous football coach.
