= Stadio Piergiovanni Mecchia =

Coordinates: 45°46′30″N 12°49′53″E

Stadio Pier Giovanni Mecchia
- Interactive map of Stadio Pier Giovanni Mecchia
- Location: Portogruaro, Italy
- Capacity: 4,021

Construction
- Opened: 1947

Tenants
- A.S.D. Portogruaro; F.B.C. Unione Venezia (2013)

Stadio Pier Giovanni Mecchia is a multi-purpose stadium in Portogruaro, Italy. It is mainly used for football matches and hosts the home matches of A.S.D. Portogruaro of the Promozione. The stadium has a capacity of 4,021 spectators.
