= ASD Viareggio Calcio =

Italian football club

Viareggio Calcio
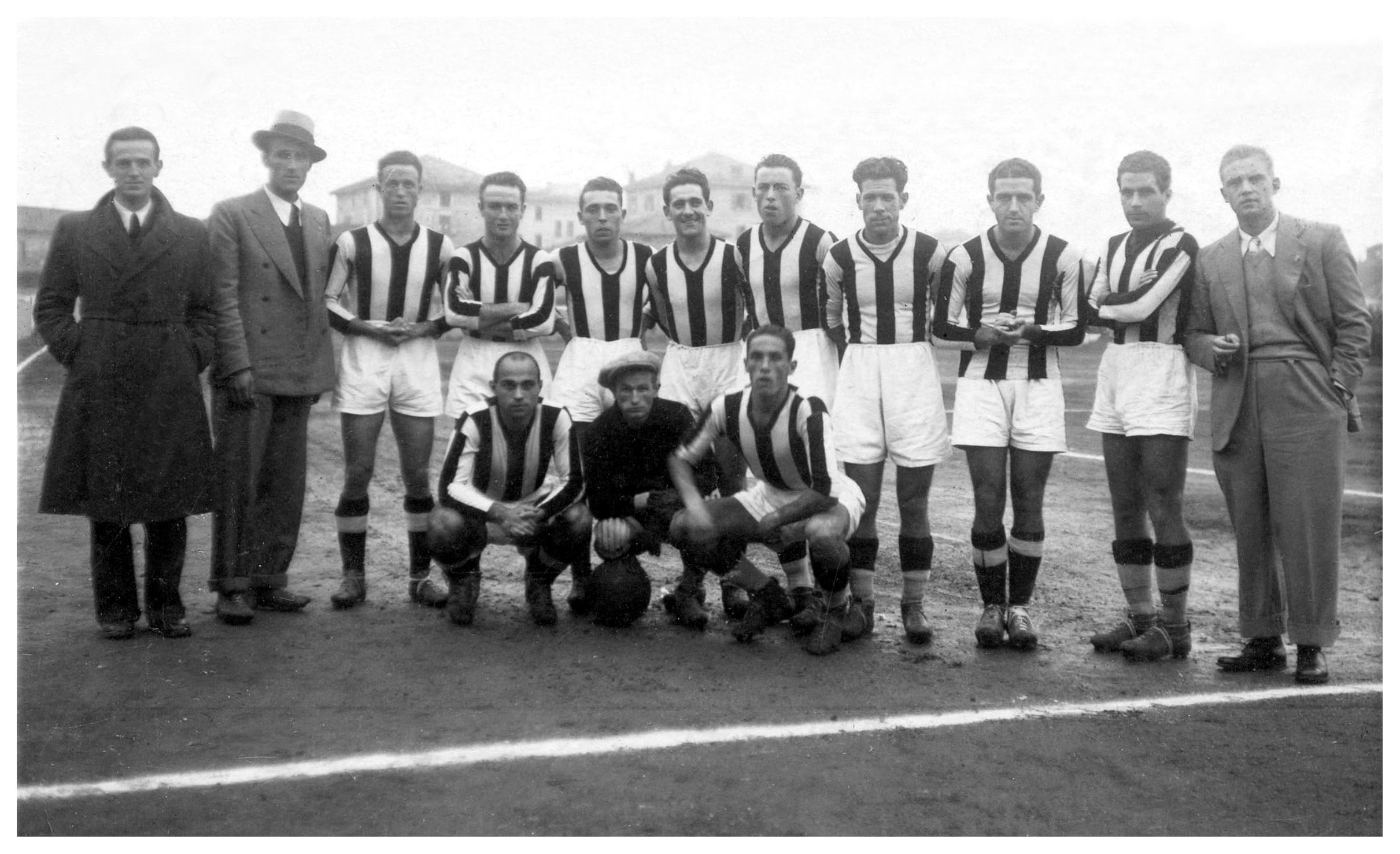
- Full name: Associazione Sportiva Dilettanistica Viareggio Calcio
- Nicknames: Le Zebre (The Zebras); Bianconeri (The Black and Whites)
- Founded: 1919 (as Viareggio Calcio); 1939 (refounded as A.S. Viareggio Calcio); 1994 (refounded as A.C. Viareggio); 2003 (refounded as F.C. Esperia Viareggio); 2014 (refounded as S.S.D. Viareggio 2014); 2020 (refounded as Viareggio Calcio)
- Ground: Stadio Torquato Bresciani
- Capacity: 7,000
- Chairman: Domenico Filippelli
- Manager: Andrea Macchetti
- League: Eccellenza
- 2025–26: Covid-suspended
Home colours	Away colours

Associazione Sportiva Dilettanistica Viareggio Calcio, usually referred to simply as Viareggio, is an Italian football club located in Viareggio, Tuscany.

== History ==
=== Esperia 1911 ===
Esperia was a football club founded in Viareggio in 1911.

=== Viareggio Calcio, A.S. Viareggio Calcio and A.C. Viareggio ===
Viareggio Calcio was founded in 1919 by a merger of 6 football clubs: Esperia, Libertas, Vigor, Giuseppe Garibaldi, Aquila and Celeritas. The club was re-founded in 1939 as A.S. Viareggio Calcio and again as A.C. Viareggio in 1994.

Viareggio played in Serie B between 1933–1937 and 1946–1948. Viareggio also spent several seasons in Serie C, notably from 1990 to 1994 and from 1997 to 2002.

In 2000s the club was acquired by the European School of Economics from Bruno Fanciullacci. The club then known as A.C. E.S.E. Viareggio.

A.C. E.S.E. Viareggio was dissolved due to bankruptcy in June 2003. The former chairman of the club Vincenzo Lombino (alias: Marvin Tracy) was charged for withdrawing money from the club with false invoices. The school itself was involved in an alleged money laundering scandal.

=== Esperia Viareggio ===
After the defunct of A.C. Viareggio, Esperia Viareggio became a successor of the club. The founding chairman of Esperia Viareggio was Mirko Lippi, but was soon replaced by Stefano Dinelli, which was the chairman from 2003 to circa 2014. However, the new club did not acquire the assets of the old club. It was reported that former A.C. Viareggio chairman Bruno Fanciullacci had acquired the assets of the old club by auction. The name "Esperia Viareggio" is a homage to the first team founded in the city, Esperia 1911.

It was reported that the Comitato Regionale Toscana, the organizer of Eccellenza Tuscany, had accepted the application of Lippi's Esperia Viareggio as a phoenix club, instead of Fanciullacci's Viareggio.

Promoted in 2006 after having won Eccellenza Tuscany and Coppa Italia Dilettanti, Esperia Viareggio gained its second consecutive promotion on 22 April 2007 by winning Group E of Serie D four matches before the end of the season.

At the end of the 2008–09 Lega Pro Seconda Divisione season, the club was admitted to Lega Pro Prima Divisione for the first time in its history.

Long serving players retired including Samuele Barsotti and Giuseppe Costantino in 2010 and Michele Fusi in 2009. Alberto Reccolani also left the club. In 2009–10 and 2010–11 the team finished the season in the relegation places, but managed to win play-offs to remain in the Lega Pro Prima Divisione. In 2010–11 the only defenders on a long-term contract were Lorenzo Fiale and Sergio Carnesalini, whilst others were borrowed from other teams. The starting goalkeeper Carlo Pinsoglio was loaned from Juventus and called up to the Italy national under-21 football team during his stay with club. In 2014 the club was excluded from the new third-tier Lega Pro for economic reasons.

However, Esperia Viareggio was later admitted to 2014–15 Terza Categoria season.

=== Viareggio 2014 ===
In August 2014, thanks to the article 52 of N.O.I.F., a new club was admitted to Eccellenza Tuscany as a successor.

After its predecessor F.C. Esperia Viareggio, which was excluded from professional leagues in 2014, "Viareggio 2014" applied as its successor and was admitted in Eccellenza Tuscany. However, Esperia Viareggio continued to play in Terza Categoria from 2014 to 2017.

== Colors and badge ==
logo of now defunct F.C. Esperia Viareggio

logo of now defunct Viareggio 2014

The club's main colors are white and black, serving as inspiration for the club's nickname, [Le] Zebre, which stands for "The Zebras."

The logo of now defunct Esperia Viareggio, featured zebra stripe and an anchor. In 2012–13 season, Burlamacco, a local crown figure, was also added to the jersey.

Esperia Viareggio wore a temporarily logo "Viareggio Ricorda" in 2009, as a memorial of Viareggio train derailment.

S.S.D. Viareggio 2014 had a similar logo background as the logo of now defunct F.C. Esperia Viareggio, but had 2014, the year of foundation on it. The logo also featured an anchor, but resemble to the crest of the city.

Viareggio 2014 also used a temporarily logo Il Mondo che vorrei in 2015 as a memorial of Viareggio train derailment.

== Stadiums ==
A.C. Viareggio played their home matches on Stadio Torquato Bresciani, which also known as Stadio dei Pini. Their successors, Esperia Viareggio and Viareggio 2014, also used that stadium until 2018.

== Players ==
=== Notable former players ===
- Alberto Libertazzi
- Seb Loeffen
- Marco Pissardo
- Daniel Theiner

== Notable former managers ==
- (Italy) Roberto Pruzzo
- (Italy) Nedo Sonetti

== Honours ==
- Coppa Italia Dilettanti
  - Winners: 2005–06
