= List of Italian football transfers winter 2008–09 =

This is a list of Italian football transfers for the January sale in the 2008–09 season. Only moves from Serie A and Serie B are listed.

The winter transfer window was open for four weeks, starting from 7 January. The window was closed at midnight on 2 February. Players without a club could join one, either during or between transfer windows.

Players aged 16 and over from the European Union or aged 18 and over from outside the EU could be registered.

== Winter transfer window ==
| Date | Name | Nationality | Moving from | Moving to | Fee |
|---|---|---|---|---|---|
| 2008-09-01^{1} | Nenad Krstičić | Serbia | (Serbia) OFK Beograd | Sampdoria | Undisclosed |
| 2008–09-26 | Blažej Vaščák | Slovakia | Lecce | (Czech Republic) Teplice | Loan |
| 2008-10-24^{1} | David Beckham | England | (United States) MLS (LA Galaxy) | AC Milan | Loan |
| 2008-11-07 | Daniele Amerini | Italy | Frosinone | Modena | Free |
| 2008-11-18 | César | Brazil | Unattached | Bologna | Free |
| 2008-11-21^{1} | Dimitrios Papadopoulos | Greece | (Greece) Panathinaikos | Lecce | Free |
| 2008-12-17 | Riccardo Tomeo | Italy | Reggina | Avellino | Undisclosed |
| 2008-12-19 | Andrea Guglielmi | Italy | Lazio | Pisa | Undisclosed |
| 2008-12-31 | Carmine Coppola | Italy | Frosinone | Salernitana | Free |
| 2 January 2009 | Simone Cavalli | Italy | Bari | Frosinone | Loan |
| 2009-01-03 | Manuel Panini | Italy | Catania | Aversa Normanna | Free |
| 2009-01-07 | Davide Raffaello | Italy | Ascoli | Viareggio | Co-ownership, undisclosed |
| 2009-01-07 | Ferdinando Rega | Italy | Ascoli | Santegidiese | Loan |
| 2009-01-07 | Lorenzo Pasqualini | Italy | Ascoli | Brindisi | Loan |
| 2009-01-07 | Ciro Sirignano | Italy | Avellino | Sambenedettese | Undisclosed |
| 2009-01-07 | Alessio Stamilla | Italy | Piacenza | Perugia | Undisclosed |
| 2009-01-07 | Nenad Novaković | Serbia | Reggina | (Denmark) Nordsjælland | Undisclosed |
| 2009-01-07 | Matej Krajčík | Czech Republic | (Czech Republic) Slavia Prague | Reggina | Undisclosed |
| 2009-01-07 | Niki Zimling | Denmark | (Denmark) Esbjerg | Udinese | Free |
| 2009-01-07 | Massimo Bonanni | Italy | Sampdoria | Grosseto | Loan |
| 2009-01-07 | Michele Marconi | Italy | Atalanta | Grosseto | Loan |
| 2009-01-07 | Alessandro Pellicori | Italy | Avellino | Grosseto | Loan |
| 2009-01-07 | Paolo Acerbis | Italy | Grosseto | Catania | Loan |
| 2009-01-07 | Ciro Polito | Italy | Catania | Grosseto | Loan |
| 2009-01-07 | Giuseppe Caccavallo | Italy | Lecce | Celano | Loan |
| 2009-01-07 | Stefano Mandorino | Italy | Lecce | Celano | Loan |
| 2009-01-08 | Pasquale Maiorino | Italy | (Switzerland) Chaux-de-Fonds | Vicenza | Undisclosed |
| 2009-01-08 | Karamoko Cissé | Guinea | Atalanta | AlbinoLeffe | Co-ownership, €0.7M |
| 2009-01-08 | Federico Peluso | Italy | AlbinoLeffe | Atalanta | Undisclosed |
| 2009-01-08 | Andrea Raggi | Italy | Palermo | Sampdoria | Loan |
| 2009-01-08 | Davide Lanzafame | Italy | Palermo | Bari | Loan |
| 2009-01-08 | Ivan Rajčić | Croatia | Bari | Frosinone | Loan |
| 2009-01-09 | César | Brazil | Chievo | Padova | Loan |
| 2009-01-09 | Ferdinando Sforzini | Italy | Udinese | Avellino | Loan |
| 2009-01-09 | Samuele Dragoni | Italy | Brescia | Piacenza | Loan |
| 2009-01-09^{2} | Oliver | Brazil | (Brazil) São Carlos | Piacenza | Undisclosed |
| 2009-01-09 | Mirko Antenucci | Italy | Catania | Pisa | Loan |
| 2009-01-09 | Juriy Cannarsa | Italy | Frosinone | Salernitana | Undisclosed |
| 2009-01-09 | Massimo Ganci | Italy | Cittadella | Salernitana | Undisclosed |
| 2009-01-09 | Cristian Cicioni | Italy | Rovigo | Vicenza | Free |
| 2009-01-11 | Conor McCormack | Republic of Ireland | (England) Manchester United (youth) | Triestina (youth) | Free |
| 2009-01-11 | Michael Collins | Republic of Ireland | (England) Liverpool (youth) | Triestina (youth) | Free |
| 2009-01-12 | Julián Di Cosmo | Argentina | Catania | Andria | Loan |
| 2009-01-12 | Fabio Gavazzi | Italy | AlbinoLeffe | Alghero | Loan |
| 2009-01-12 | Marco Martini | Italy | Frosinone | Reggiana | Loan |
| 2009-01-13 | Davide Carcuro | Italy | Fiorentina | Crotone | Loan |
| 2009-01-13 | Mauro Belotti | Italy | AlbinoLeffe | South Tyrol | Undisclosed |
| 2009-01-13 | Ivan Fatić | Montenegro | Internazionale | Salernitana | Loan |
| 2009-01-13 | Maurizio Ciaramitaro | Italy | Palermo | Salernitana | Loan |
| 2009-01-13 | Sakari Mattila | Finland | (Finland) HJK Helsinki | Udinese | Undisclosed |
| 2009-01-13 | Paolo Castellazzi | Italy | Sampdoria | SPAL | Loan |
| 2009-01-14 | Hernán Dellafiore | Italy | Palermo | Torino | Loan |
| 2009-01-14 | Dario Venitucci | Italy | Juventus | Avellino | Loan |
| 2009-01-14 | Alain Nef | Switzerland | Udinese | (Spain) Recreativo de Huelva | Loan |
| 2009-01-14 | Mark Edusei | Ghana | Catania | Bari | Undisclosed |
| 2009-01-15 | Giampaolo Pazzini | Italy | Fiorentina | Sampdoria | Undisclosed |
| 2009-01-15 | Emiliano Bonazzoli | Italy | Sampdoria | Fiorentina | Loan |
| 2009-01-15 | Francesco Cosenza | Italy | Reggina | Avellino | Loan |
| 2009-01-15 | Almamy Doumbia | Ivory Coast | Andria | Bari | Co-ownership, undisclosed |
| 2009-01-16 | Fernando Forestieri | Italy | Genoa | Vicenza | Loan, €50,000 |
| 2009-01-18 | Mijat Marić | Switzerland | Bari | (Belgium) Eupen | Undisclosed |
| 2009-01-19 | Bogdan Pătraşcu | Romania | Piacenza | Padova | Loan |
| 2009-01-19 | Domenico Falco | Italy | Ascoli | Vigor Lamezia | Free |
| 20 January 2009 | Davide Matteini | Italy | Parma | Rimini | €1M (swap with Lunardini, co-owned with Palermo) |
| 20 January 2009 | Francesco Lunardini | Italy | Rimini | Parma | Co-ownership, €1M (swap with Matteini) |
| 20 January 2009 | Daniele Vantaggiato | Italy | Rimini | Parma | Co-ownership, €1.9M |
| 2009-01-20 | Daniele Paponi | Italy | Parma | Rimini | Loan |
| 2009-01-20 | Gianluca Sansone | Italy | Siena | Gallipoli | Loan |
| 2009-01-20 | Vitali Kutuzov | Belarus | Parma | Bari | Co-ownership, undisclosed |
| 2009-01-20 | Pablo Daniel Osvaldo | Italy | Fiorentina | Bologna | Loan, €2M |
| 2009-01-21 | Massimo Mutarelli | Italy | Lazio | Bologna | Free |
| 2009-01-21 | Edinho | Brazil | (Brazil) Internacional | Lecce | Undisclosed |
| 2009-01-21 | Mirko Savini | Italy | Napoli | Palermo | Undisclosed |
| 2009-01-21 | Ciro Capuano | Italy | Palermo | Catania | Loan |
| 2009-01-22 | Stephen Makinwa | Nigeria | Lazio | Chievo | Loan |
| 2009-01-22 | Antimo Iunco | Italy | Chievo | Salernitana | Loan |
| 2009-01-22 | Loris Formuso | Italy | Taranto | Parma | Undisclosed |
| 2009-01-22 | Marco Carparelli | Italy | Grosseto | Cittadella | Loan |
| 2009-01-23 | Elia Legati | Italy | Milan | Novara | Loan |
| 2009-01-23 | Matthias Lepiller | France | Fiorentina | (Belgium) Eupen | Loan |
| 2009-01-23 | Jan Hable | Czech Republic | Fiorentina | (Czech Republic) Baník Ostrava | Loan |
| 2009-01-26 | Mario Kirev | Bulgaria | (Bulgaria) Slavia Sofia | Juventus | Undisclosed |
| 2009-01-26 | Julián Magallanes | Argentina | Sangiustese | Vicenza | Undisclosed |
| 2009-01-26 | Manuel Belleri | Italy | Lazio | Bologna | Loan |
| 2009-01-26 | Vasco Regini | Italy | Cesena | Sampdoria | Loan |
| 2009-01-26 | Manuel Morra | Italy | Modena | Sassuolo | Youth |
| 2009-01-26 | Jose Luis Castro Colman | Paraguay | Cittadella | Pro Vercelli | Loan |
| 2009-01-27 | Papa Waigo | Senegal | Fiorentina | Lecce | Loan |
| 2009-01-27 | Dario D'Ambrosio | Italy | Lecco | Triestina | Undisclosed |
| 2009-01-27 | Gastón Cellerino | Argentina | (Uruguay) Fénix | Livorno | Undisclosed |
| 2009-01-27 | Claudio Rivalta | Italy | Atalanta | Torino | Undisclosed |
| 2009-01-27 | Savio Nsereko | Germany | Brescia | (England) West Ham United | Undisclosed |
| 2009-01-28 | Leonardo Bonucci | Italy | Internazionale | Pisa | Loan |
| 2009-01-28 | Felipe Mattioni | Brazil | (Brazil) Maga | AC Milan | Loan |
| 2009-01-28 | Szabolcs Üveges | Hungary | (Hungary) Újpest | Parma | Loan |
| 2009-01-28 | Dario Passoni | Italy | Mantova | Piacenza | Loan |
| 2009-01-28 | Sergio Ercolano | Italy | Perugia | Treviso | Loan |
| 2009-01-28 | Carlo Zotti | Italy | Cittadella | (Switzerland) Bellinzona | Undisclosed |
| 2009-01-29 | Ricardo Villar | Argentina | Cesena | Udinese | Free |
| 2009-01-29 | Nicola Rota | Italy | Lecco | Brescia | Loan, Youth |
| 2009-01-29 | Riccardo Saponara | Italy | Ravenna | Empoli | Co-ownership, undisclosed |
| 2009-01-29 | Matteo Bruscagin | Italy | Milan | Pizzighettone | Loan |
| 2009-01-29 | Keivan Zarineh | Iran | Roma | Paganese | Loan |
| 2009-01-29 | Gianmarco Piccioni | Italy | Sambenedettese | Vicenza | Co-ownership, undisclosed |
| 2009-01-29 | German Pomiro | Argentina | Sambenedettese | Vicenza | Co-ownership, undisclosed |
| 2009-01-29 | Mattia Evangelisti | Italy | Sambenedettese | Vicenza | Co-ownership, undisclosed |
| 2009-01-30 | Filippo Forò | Italy | Sambenedettese | Vicenza | Co-ownership, undisclosed |
| 2009-01-30 | Filippo Forò | Italy | Vicenza | Sambenedettese | Loan |
| 2009-01-30 | Marco Zentil | Italy | Vicenza | Sambenedettese | Co-ownership, undisclosed |
| 2009-01-30 | Stefano Pietribiasi | Italy | Vicenza | Sambenedettese | Co-ownership, undisclosed |
| 2009-01-30 | Nicolás Corvetto | Chile | Udinese | (Spain) Albacete | Loan |
| 30 January 2009 | Michele Ferri | Italy | Cagliari | Sampdoria | €1,000 |
| 2009-01-30 | Manuel da Costa | Portugal | Fiorentina | Sampdoria | Loan |
| '30 January 2009 | Antonio Chimenti | Italy | Udinese | Juventus | Free (swap with Belardi) |
| 30 January 2009 | Emanuele Belardi | Italy | Juventus | Udinese | Free (swap with Chimenti) |
| 2009-01-30 | Roberto D'Aversa | Italy | Treviso | Mantova | Loan |
| 2009-01-30 | Marco Valerio Riva | Italy | Internazionale | Brescia | Youth |
| 2009-01-30 | Daniele Martinetti | Italy | Arezzo | Sassuolo | Co-ownership, undisclosed |
| 2009-01-30 | Aiman Napoli | Italy | Pro Sesto | Internazionale | Co-ownership resolution, undisclosed |
| 2009-01-30 | Juri Toppan | Italy | (Switzerland) Chaux-de-Fonds | Internazionale | Undisclosed |
| 2009-01-30 | Samon Reider Rodríguez | Cuba | Juventus | Alessandria | Loan |
| 2009-01-30 | Mikhail Sivakov | Belarus | (Belarus) BATE Borisov | Cagliari | Undisclosed |
| 2009-01-31 | Souleymane Diamoutene | Senegal | Lecce | Roma | Loan |
| 2009-02-01 | Mario Kirev | Bulgaria | Juventus | (Switzerland) Grasshopper | Loan |
| 2009-02-01 | Marco Motta | Italy | Udinese | Roma | Loan |
| 2009-02-02 | Francesco Parravicini | Italy | Parma | Atalanta | Loan |
| 2009-02-02 | Antonino D'Agostino | Italy | Atalanta | Parma | Loan |
| 2009-02-02 | Alessio Manzoni | Italy | Atalanta | Parma | Loan |
| 2009-02-02 | Gianvito Plasmati | Italy | Catania | Atalanta | Loan |
| 2009-02-02 | Olivier Dacourt | France | Internazionale | (England) Fulham | Loan |
| 2009-02-02 | Ricardo Quaresma | Portugal | Internazionale | (England) Chelsea | Loan |
| 2009-02-02 | Nikola Gulan | Serbia | Fiorentina | (Germany) 1860 Munich | Loan |
| 2009-02-02 | Ibrahim Maaroufi | Morocco | Internazionale | Vicenza | Co-ownership, undisclosed |
| 2009-02-02 | Duccio Innocenti | Italy | Grosseto | Vicenza | Loan |
| 2009-02-02 | Andrea Capone | Italy | Vicenza | Grosseto | Loan |
| 2009-02-02 | Simone Calori | Italy | Vicenza | Perugia | Loan |
| 2009-02-02 | Giampietro Perrulli | Italy | Vicenza | Pescara | Loan |
| 2009-02-02 | Alessandro Potenza | Italy | Genoa | Catania | Co-ownership, undisclosed |
| 2009-02-02 | Gennaro Sardo | Italy | Catania | Chievo | Loan |
| 2009-02-02 | Giuseppe Colucci | Italy | Catania | Chievo | Undisclosed |
| 2009-02-02 | Gianluca Litteri | Italy | Treviso | Internazionale | Co-ownership resolution, undisclosed |
| 2009-02-02 | Emiliano Viviano | Italy | Brescia | Internazionale | Co-ownership, undisclosed |
| 2009-02-02 | Emiliano Viviano | Italy | Internazionale | Brescia | Loan |
| 2009-02-02 | Pajtim Kasami | Switzerland | (Switzerland) Grasshopper | Lazio | Youth |
| 2009-02-02 | Jorge Ortega | Paraguay | (Paraguay) Tacuary | Lecce | Loan |
| 2009-02-02 | Abel Hernández | Uruguay | (Uruguay) Peñarol | Palermo | Undisclosed |
| 2009-02-02 | Francesco Sabatucci | Italy | Cisco Roma | Palermo | Loan |
| 2009-02-02 | Eros Pellegrini | Italy | Treviso | Palermo | Undisclosed |
| 2009-02-02 | Michel Morganella | Switzerland | (Switzerland) Basel | Palermo | Undisclosed |
| 2009-02-02 | Vincenzo Camilleri | Italy | (England) Chelsea | Reggina | Youth |
| 2009-02-02 | David Sugar | Croatia | (Switzerland) Bellinzona | Roma | Loan |
| 2009-02-02 | Valerio Virga | Italy | Roma | Novara | Loan |
| 2009-02-02 | Stefano Okaka Chuka | Italy | Roma | Brescia | Loan |
| 2009-02-02 | Fabio Zamblera | Italy | (England) Newcastle United | Sampdoria | Loan |
| 2009-02-02 | Roberto Soriano | Italy | (Germany) Bayern Munich | Sampdoria | Undisclosed |
| 2009-02-02 | Nicola Amoruso | Italy | Torino | Siena | Loan |
| 2009-02-02 | Andrea Gasbarroni | Italy | Genoa | Torino | Co-ownership, €0.5M |
| 2009-02-02 | Stefano Procida | Italy | Napoli | Torino | Co-ownership resolution, Free |
| 2009-02-02 | Ricardo Chará | Colombia | (Colombia) Quindío | Udinese | Loan |
| 2009-02-02 | Andrea Zamuner | Italy | Venezia | Udinese | Loan |
| 2009-02-02 | Mouhamed Abdoulaye Tine | | Pescara | Udinese | Youth |
| 2009-02-02 | Stefano Guberti | Italy | Ascoli | Bari | Free |
| 2009-02-02 | Maurizio Nassi | Italy | Ancona | Brescia | Undisclosed |
| 2009-02-02 | Luca Tognozzi | Italy | Reggina | Brescia | Loan |
| 2009-02-02 | Luca Di Matteo | Italy | Palermo | Cittadella | Loan |
| 2009-02-02 | Federico Gerardi | Italy | Udinese | Cittadella | Loan |
| 2009-02-02 | Jonathan Rossini | Switzerland | Sampdoria | Cittadella | Loan |
| 2009-02-02 | Gastón Brugman | Uruguay | (Uruguay) Peñarol | Empoli | Youth |
| 2009-02-02 | Davide Carrus | Italy | Bologna | Empoli | Loan |
| 2009-02-02 | Rocco Sabato | Italy | Catania | Empoli | Undisclosed |
| 2009-02-02 | Csaba Csizmadia | Hungary | (Austria) Mattersburg | Grosseto | Undisclosed |
| 2009-02-02 | Simone Grippo | Switzerland | Chievo | Piacenza | Loan |
| 2009-02-02 | Emanuele D'Anna | Italy | Chievo | Pisa | Loan |
| 2009-02-02 | Emmanuel Ledesma | Argentina | Genoa | Salernitana | Loan |
| 2009-02-02 | Roberto Merino | Spain | (Greece) Atromitos | Salernitana | Undisclosed |
| 2009-02-02 | Andrea Pinzan | Italy | Grosseto | Sassuolo | Undisclosed |
| 2009-02-02 | Tommaso Berni | Italy | Lazio | Salernitana | Loan |
| 2009-02-02 | Jesús Dátolo | Argentina | (Argentina) Boca Juniors | Napoli | Undisclosed |
| 2009-02-02 | Pablo Álvarez | Argentina | Catania | (Argentina) Rosario Central | Loan |
| 2009-02-02 | Kingsley Umunegbu | Nigeria | Milan | Portogruaro | Loan |
| 2009-02-02 | Maximilano Ré | Argentina | Siena | Colligiana | Loan |
| 2009-02-02 | Rodrigo De Lazzari | Brazil | Siena | Colligiana | Undisclosed |
| 2009-02-02 | Dominique Malonga | France | Torino | Foggia | Loan |
| 2009-02-02 | Federico Raúl Laurito | Argentina | Udinese | Venezia | Loan |
| 2009-02-02 | Giovanni Barreca | Italy | Sorrento | Udinese | Undisclosed |
| 2009-02-02 | Giovanni Barreca | Italy | Udinese | Treviso | Co-ownership, undisclosed |
| 2009-02-02 | Marcel Román | Uruguay | Genoa | Frosinone | Loan |
| 2009-02-02 | Alessandro Bettega | Italy | Siena | Pizzighettone | |
| 2009-02-02 | Leandro Greco | Italy | Roma | Pisa | Loan |
| 2009-02-02 | Federico Dionisi | Italy | Celano | Livorno | Undisclosed |
| 2009-02-02 | Anssi Jaakkola | Finland | Siena | Colligiana | Loan |
| 2009-02-02 | Jani Tapani Virtanen | Finland | Udinese | (Russia) Khimki | Loan |
| 2009-02-02 | Viktor Budyanskiy | Russia | Udinese | (Russia) Khimki | Loan |
| 2009-02-02 | Federico Dionisi | Italy | Livorno | Celano | Loan |
| 2 February 2009 | Paolo Ginestra | Italy | Ternana | Parma | Loan |
| 2009-02-02 | Alen Stevanović | Serbia | (Serbia) Radnički Obrenovac | Internazionale | Undisclosed |
| 2009-02-02 | Alberto Galuppo | Italy | Parma | Treviso | Loan |
| 2009-02-02 | Fabio Giordano | Italy | Cittadella | Pescara | Loan |
| 2009-02-02 | Albin Hodza | France | Udinese | Sorrento | Co-ownership, undisclosed |
| 2 February 2009 | Alessandro Osso | Italy | Udinese | Colligiana | Co-ownership, undisclosed |
| 2009-02-02 | Luca Siligardi | Italy | Internazionale | Piacenza | Loan |
| 2009-02-02 | Daniele Fiorentino | Italy | Bari | Paganese | Loan |
| 2009-02-02 | Sodinha | Brazil | Udinese | Paganese | Loan |
| 2009-02-02 | Rej Volpato | Italy | Bari | Piacenza | Loan |
| 2009-02-02 | Nicola Strambelli | Italy | Bari | Andria | Loan |
| 2009-02-02 | Matteo Lanzoni | Italy | Sampdoria | Sambenedettese | Loan |
| 2009-02-02 | Davide Desideri | Italy | Bari | Lumezzane | Undisclosed |
| 2009-02-02 | Claudio De Pascalis | Italy | Bari | Noicattaro | Undisclosed |
| 2009-02-02 | Angelo Bencivenga | Italy | (Switzerland) la Chaux-de-Fonds | Udinese (youth) | Loan |
| 2009-02-02 | Filippo Savi | Italy | Parma | SPAL | Co-ownership, undisclosed |
| 2009-02-02 | Antonio Gaeta | Italy | Ascoli | Juve Stabia | Loan |
| 2009-02-02 | Matteo Chinellato | Italy | Venezia | Fiorentina (youth) | €0.1M |
| 2009-02-02 | Lorenzo Morelli | Italy | Fiorentina | Venezia | Loan |
| 2 February 2009 | Julien Rantier | France | Piacenza | Verona | Undisclosed |
| 2 February 2009 | Cristian Cesaretti | Italy | Empoli (at Monza, t) | Foligno | Loan |
| 2009-02-03 | Loïc Lumbilla | France | Internazionale | Écija Balompié (Spain) | Free |
| | Jonathan Bottinelli | Argentina | Sampdoria | (Argentina) San Lorenzo | Loan |
| | Moreno | Brazil | Udinese | (Belgium) Eupen | Loan |
| | Andrea Migliorini | Italy | Livorno | Pro Patria | Loan |
| | Fabio Firmani | Italy | Lazio | (United Arab Emirates) Al-Wasl | Loan |
| | Chedric Seedorf | Netherlands | Milan | (Netherlands) Haarlem | Loan |
| | Fernando Cafasso | Argentina | (Paraguay) Guaraní | Treviso | Undisclosed |
| | William Jidayi | Italy | Sassuolo | Padova | Loan |
| | Vasco Regini | Italy | Cesena | Sampdoria | Loan |
| | Marcus Diniz | Brazil | Livorno | Crotone | Loan |
| | Valerio Bertotto | Italy | Siena | Venezia | Free |
| | Domenico Maietta | Italy | Crotone | Frosinone | |
| | Bruno Mota | Switzerland | Sampdoria | (Switzerland) Chiasso | |
| | Enrico Pepe | Italy | Salernitana | Cassino | Loan |
| | Carmine Cucciniello | Italy | Sampdoria | Paganese | Loan |
| | Robert Maah | France | Pro Sesto | Grosseto | |
| | Luigi Beghetto | Italy | Treviso | (Switzerland) Bellinzona | |
| | Tobia Fuscello | Italy | Atalanta | Portogruaro | |
| | Rodrigo Thiago | Brazil | Chievo | Itala San Marco | Loan |
| | Salvatore Burrai | Italy | Cagliari | Ternana | Loan |
| | Simone Palermo | Italy | Treviso | Pistoiese | Loan |
| | Imperio Carcione | Italy | Salernitana | Benevento | Undisclosed |
| | Giampaolo Ciarciá | Italy | Salernitana | Benevento | Undisclosed |
| | Radek Petr | Czech Republic | Parma | (Belgium) Eupen | Loan |
| | Antonio Rizzo | Italy | Reggina | Ravenna | Loan |
| | João Paulo Fernando Marangon | Brazil | Roma | Vibonese | Loan |
| | Leandro Antonio Martínez | Italy | Parma | Carpenedolo | Loan |
| | Lorenzo Poli | Italy | Roma | Benevento | Co-ownership, undisclosed |

- ^1 Player officially joined his new club on 7 January 2009.
- ^2 Player officially joined his new club on 1 July 2009.

=== Out of window transfer ===
| Date | Name | Nationality | Moving from | Moving to | Fee |
|---|---|---|---|---|---|
| 2009-02-05 | Luca Bucci | Italy | Unattached | Napoli | Free |
| 2009-02-12 | Joaquín Larrivey | Argentina | Cagliari | (Argentina) Vélez Sársfield | Loan |
| 2009-02-13 | Frank Feltscher | Switzerland | Lecce | (Switzerland) Bellinzona | Loan |
| 2009-03-02 | Jo Inge Berget | Norway | Udinese | (Norway) Lyn | Loan |
| 2009-03-18 | Sidny | Brazil | Livorno (on loan at Sport) | (Brazil) Náutico | Loan |
| 2009-03-28 | Davide Zomer | Italy | Unattached (Lumezzane) | Ascoli | Free |

== See also ==
- List of Italian football transfers summer 2007
