= List of Italian football transfers winter 2011–12 =

This is a list of Italian football transfers for the 2011–12 season. Only moves from Serie A and Serie B are listed.

The Italian winter transfer window would open for four weeks starting from 3 January 2012 (Tuesday). Players without a club could join one either during or in between transfer windows. International transfers outward depended on the status of transfer windows of the country the player arrived from.

Clubs could still use their two non-EU international signing quota in the winter windows if they did not use the quota in summer, subject to the club having either released (on 1 July 2011), sold abroad, or nominated players which had obtained an EU passport recently. These transfers are marked yellow.

== Winter transfer window ==
Date	Name	Nationality	Moving from	Moving to	Fee
8 December 2011	Alemão	Brazil	Vicenza	(Brazil) Grêmio Catanduvense	Loan
30 December 2011	Ivan Merli Sala	Italy	Foligno	Lecco	Undisclosed (co-owned with Chievo)
2 January 2012	Davide Bertolucci	Italy	Verona	Taranto	Loan
3 January 2012	Salvatore Foti	Italy	Sampdoria	Brescia	Loan
3 January 2012	Juan Antonio	Argentina	Brescia	Sampdoria	Undisclosed
3 January 2012	Gaetano Berardi	Switzerland	Brescia	Sampdoria	Undisclosed
3 January 2012	Daniele Federici	Italy	Grosseto	Frosinone	Undisclosed
3 January 2012	Alberto Gilardino	Italy	Fiorentina	Genoa	€8M
3 January 2012	Marco Borriello	Italy	Roma	Juventus	Loan, €0.5M
3 January 2012	Matteo Bruscagin	Italy	Grosseto	Latina	Co-ownership, Undisclosed
3 January 2012	Francesco Signori	Italy	Sampdoria	Modena	Loan
3 January 2012	Giacomo Tulli	Italy	Vicenza (& Cesena)	Pisa	Loan
3 January 2012	Massimo Coda	Italy	Bologna	Siracusa	Loan
3 January 2012	Domenico Danti	Italy	Vicenza (& Siena)	Ternana	Loan
3 January 2012	Simone Missiroli	Italy	Reggina	Sassuolo	€3.5M
4 January 2012	Pier Graziano Gori	Italy	Nocerina	Benevento	Undisclosed
4 January 2012	Leonardo Terigi	Italy	Crotone	Carpi	Loan
4 January 2012	Alessandro Scialpi	Italy	Varese	Carpi	Loan
4 January 2012	Daniel Cappelletti	Italy	Palermo (on loan at Sassuolo)	Juve Stabia	Loan
4 January 2012	Emiliano Massimo	Italy	Roma	Avellino	Co-ownership
4 January 2012	Salvatore Burrai	Italy	Cagliari	Latina	Co-ownership
4 January 2012	Angelo Rea	Italy	Sassuolo	Nocerina	Loan
4 January 2012	Emanuele Concetti	Italy	Pergocrema	Nocerina	Loan
4 January 2012	Alessandro Fabbro	Italy	Juve Stabia	Pergocrema	Free
5 January 2012	Luca Rizzo	Italy	Sampdoria	Foligno	Loan
5 January 2012	Nwankwo Obiora	Nigeria	Parma	Gubbio	Loan
9 January 2012	Daniele Magliocchetti	Italy	Cagliari	Reggiana	Undisclosed
9 January 2012	Nicolas Bovi	Italy	Reggiana	Cagliari	Loan
10 January 2012	Kadir Caidi	Italy	Bologna (& Cesena, c, at Santarcangelo, t)	Bellaria	Loan
10 January 2012	Luca Pompilio	Italy	Varese (youth)	Foggia	Loan
10 January 2012	Martin Asiedu Ofosu	Ghana	Como	Novara	Loan return
10 January 2012	Luca Ricci	Italy	Cesena	Spezia	Loan
10 January 2012	Aldo Simoncini	San Marino	Cesena	Valenzana	Loan
11 January 2012	Giovanni Di Noia	Italy	Bari (youth)	Chieti	Loan
11 January 2012	Davide Biondini	Italy	Cagliari	Genoa	Free
11 January 2012	Marco Bernacci	Italy	Bologna (on loan at Modena)	Livorno	Loan
11 January 2012	Romano Perticone	Italy	Livorno	Modena	Loan
11 January 2012	Matteo Ardemagni	Italy	Atalanta	Modena	Loan
11 January 2012	Juri Tamburini	Italy	Ascoli	Pergocrema	Undisclosed
11 January 2012	Marco Piccinni	Italy	Bari	Piacenza	Undisclosed
11 January 2012	Mattia Spezzani	Modena	Reggiana	Loan	
11 January 2012	Michele Gabbianelli	Italy	Cesena (on loan at Bellaria)	Santarcangelo	Loan
11 January 2012	Alessandro Marotta	Bari	Spezia	Loan, €200,000	
11 January 2012	Giacomo Bassoli	Italy	Cesena (& Bologna, on loan at Santarcangelo)	Valenzana	Loan
12 January 2012	Dario Toninelli	Italy	Varese (on loan at Latina)	Bassano	Loan
12 January 2012	Salvatore Caturano	Italy	Empoli (on loan at Nocerina)	Foligno	Co-ownership, Undisclosed
12 January 2012	Lorenzo Burzigotti	Italy	Reggina	Latina	Loan
13 January 2012	Filippo Boniperti	Italy	Juventus (at Ascoli, t)	Carpi	Loan
13 January 2012	Francesco Gazo	Italy	AlbinoLeffe	Prato	Co-ownership
13 January 2012	Cesare Bovo	Italy	Palermo	Genoa	€1.3M
13 January 2012	Emiliano Viviano	Italy	Genoa	Palermo	€5M (co-owned with Internazionale)
13 January 2012	Salvatore Mastronunzio	Italy	Siena (on loan at Spezia)	Gubbio	Loan
13 January 2012	Diego Falcinelli	Italy	Sassuolo	Juve Stabia	Loan
13 January 2012	Danilo Alessandro	Italy	Grosseto	Taranto	Free
14 January 2012	Emanuele Testardi	Italy	Sampdoria (on loan at Pergocrema)	Siracusa	Loan
16 January 2012	Riccardo Pasi	Italy	Bologna	(Switzerland) Chiasso	Loan
16 January 2012	Marcello Gazzola	Italy	Ascoli	Sassuolo	Undisclosed
16 January 2012	Iago Falqué	Spain	Juventus	(England) Tottenham Hotspur	€1M
17 January 2012	Santiago Silva	Uruguay	Fiorentina	(Argentina) Boca Juniors	€1.5M
17 January 2012	Frederik Sørensen	Denmark	Juventus	Bologna	Co-ownership, €2.5M (€75,000 + Taider)
17 January 2012	Saphir Sliti Taïder	France	Bologna	Juventus	Co-ownership, €2.425M (part of Sorensen)
17 January 2012	Daniele Donnarumma	Italy	Napoli (at Nocerina)	Carpi	Loan
17 January 2012	Paolo Marchi	Italy	Varese (on loan at Carpi)	Casale	Loan
17 January 2012	Alexander Merkel	Germany	Genoa	Milan	Loan (between co-owner)
17 January 2012	Fausto Rossi	Italy	Vicenza	Juventus	Co-ownership resolution, €1.7M (€0.2M + Pinsoglio)
17 January 2012	Carlo Pinsoglio	Italy	Juventus (on loan at Pescara)	Vicenza	Co-ownership, €1.5M (part of F.Rossi)
17 January 2012	Riccardo Meggiorini	Italy	Genoa (at Novara, t)	Torino	Co-ownership, €1M
18 January 2012	Andrea Grieco	Italy	Sampdoria (on loan at Viareggio)	Aprilia	Loan
18 January 2012	Guglielmo Stendardo	Italy	Lazio	Atalanta	Loan
18 January 2012	Riccardo Improta	Italy	Lanciano	Genoa	Loan
18 January 2012	Giuseppe Sculli	Italy	Lazio	Genoa	Loan
18 January 2012	Djamel Mesbah	Algeria	Lecce	Milan	Undisclosed
18 January 2012	David Speziale	Italy	Milan (youth)	Lecce (youth)	Co-ownership, Undisclosed
18 January 2012	David Speziale	Italy	Lecce (youth)	Milan (youth)	Loan (loan between co-owner)
18 January 2012	Massimo Donati	Italy	Bari	Palermo	Free
19 January 2012	Manuel Scalise	Italy	Nocerina	Ascoli	Undisclosed
19 January 2012	Gianluca Freddi	Italy	Grosseto	Reggina	Undisclosed
20 January 2012	Bruno Martella	Italy	Pescara (& Sampdoria)	Viareggio	Loan
22 January 2012	Vitorino Antunes	Portugal	Roma	(Greece) Panionios	Loan
23 January 2012	Andrea Paolucci	Italy	Andria	Cittadella	€80,000 (co-owned with Fiorentina)
23 January 2012'	Joel Obi	Nigeria	Parma	Internazionale	Co-ownership resolution, €3.2M
23 January 2012	Lorenzo Crisetig	Italy	Internazionale	Parma (remains at Inter, t)	Co-ownership, €1.5M
23 January 2012	Yao	Ivory Coast	Parma	Internazionale (remains at Parma, t)	Co-ownership, €1M (Galimberti + Mella)
23 January 2012	Jacopo Galimberti	Italy	Internazionale	Parma	Co-ownership, €0.5M (part of Yao)
23 January 2012	Diego Mella	Italy	Internazionale	Parma	Co-ownership, €0.5M (part of Yao)
23 January 2012	Jonathan Moreira	Brazil	Internazionale	Parma	Loan
23 January 2012	Niko Bianconi	Italy	Vicenza (co-owned with Juventus)	(Belgium) Visé	Loan
24 January 2012	Alessandro Marchi	Italy	Piacenza	Bologna	Co-ownership, Undisclosed
24 January 2012	Alessandro Marchi	Italy	Bologna	Piacenza	Loan (between co-owner)
24 January 2012	Federico Rodríguez	Uruguay	Bologna (co-owned with Genoa)	Piacenza	Loan
24 January 2012	Amauri	Italy	Juventus	Fiorentina	€0.5M
24 January 2012	Leonardo Martín Migliónico	Uruguay	Livorno	Lecce	Undisclosed
24 January 2012	Riccardo Ragni	Italy	Andria	Pescara	Loan (between co-owner)
24 January 2012	Savio Nsereko	Germany	Fiorentina (on loan at Juve Stabia)	(Romania) Vaslui	Loan, €50,000
24 January 2012	Christian Tiboni	Italy	Atalanta (on loan at Foggia)	Monza	Loan
25 January 2012	Alessandro Carrozza	Italy	Varese	Atalanta	Loan
25 January 2012	Manuele Blasi	Italy	Parma	Lecce	Undisclosed
25 January 2012	Stefano Ferrario	Italy	Lecce	Parma	Loan
25 January 2012	Marco Calderoni	Italy	Piacenza	Grosseto	End of loan
26 January 2012	Thomas Pedrabissi	Italy	Internazionale (youth)	Cesena (remained in Internazionale)	Co-ownership, Undisclosed
26 January 2012	Marko Livaja	Croatia	Cesena (youth)	Internazionale (youth)	Co-ownership, Undisclosed (de facto loan return)
26 January 2012	Haris Seferovic	Switzerland	Fiorentina (on loan at Neuchâtel Xamax)	Lecce	Loan
26 January 2012	Lorenzo Laverone	Sassuolo (& Reggina, c)	Nocerina	Loan	
26 January 2012	Gael Genevier	France	Siena (on loan at Livorno)	Pisa	?
26 January 2012	Simone Bentivoglio	Italy	Chievo (on loan at Sampdoria)	Padova	Loan
26 January 2012	Jurgen Pandiani	Italy	Atalanta	Monza	Loan (co-owned with Alessandria)
26 January 2012	Federico Gerardi	Italy	Grosseto	Ascoli	Loan
27 January 2012	Nicola Ferrari	Italy	South Tyrol	Foligno	Undisclosed (co-owned with Sassuolo)
27 January 2012	Martín Cáceres	Uruguay	(Spain) Sevilla	Juventus	Loan, €1.5M + €8M obligation
27 January 2012	Francesco Nicastro	Italy	Catania (on loan at Pisa)	Milazzo	Loan
28 January 2012	Marco Costantino	Juventus (at Latina, t)	SPAL	Loan	
29 January 2012	Gianluca Caprari	Roma (youth)	Pescara	Loan	
30 January 2012	Davide Elia Ballardini	Italy	Cesena (on loan at Carrarese)	Andria	Loan
30 January 2012	Massimiliano Marsili	Italy	Nocerina	Andria	Undisclosed
30 January 2012	Pietro Accardi	Sampdoria	Brescia	Free	
30 January 2012	Andrea Magrassi	Brescia	Sampdoria (at Brescia, t)	€2M	
30 January 2012	Fausto Rossi	Juventus	Brescia	Loan	
30 January 2012	Abdoulwhaid Sissoko	Udinese	Brest (France)	Loan	
30 January 2012	Felice Natalino	Internazionale (& Genoa, c; at Verona, t)	Crotone	Loan	
30 January 2012	Philippe Coutinho (Brazil)	Internazionale	(Spain) Espanyol	Loan	
30 January 2012	Ruben Olivera (Uruguay)	Lecce	Fiorentina	€1.5M	
30 January 2012	Mattia Evangelisti	Cesena (& Vicenza, c; at Andria, t)	Foligno	Loan	
30 January 2012	Ciro Immobile	Juventus (at Pescara, t)	Genoa (at Pescara, t)	Co-ownership, €4M	
30 January 2012	Juan (Brazil)	Internacional (& third parties owner via proxy Coimbra) (Brazil)	Internazionale	Undisclosed	
30 January 2012	Fabrizio Paghera	Brescia	Lanciano	Loan	
30 January 2012	Riccardo Martignago	Cittadella	Latina	Loan	
30 January 2012	Luca Toni	Juventus	Al-Nasr (United Arab Emirates)	Free	
30 January 2012	Mariga (Kenya)	Internazionale (at Sociedad, t)	Parma	Loan	
30 January 2012	Aiman Napoli	Internazionale	Prato	Loan	
30 January 2012	Niccolò Giannetti	Siena	Südtirol	Loan	
30 January 2012	Stefano Giacomelli	Pescara	Ternana	Loan	
30 January 2012	Emanuel Rivas	Argentina	Bari	Varese	Undisclosed
30 January 2012	Armando Visconti	Bari	Vibonese	?	
30 January 2012	Alex Pinardi	Italy	Novara	Vicenza	Loan
30 January 2012	Simone Magnaghi	Italy	Atalanta (youth)	Tritium	Loan
30 January 2012	Nicolò Brighenti	Italy	Viareggio (& Chievo, c)	Vicenza (& Chievo, c)	€40,000
31 January 2012	Alessandro Elia	Italy	Parma (at Viareggio, t)	Arzanese	Loan
31 January 2012	Adriano Montalto	Italy	Siracusa	Ascoli	Free
31 January 2012	Ilario Aloe	Italy	Ascoli	Siracusa	Free
31 January 2012	Giovanni Tomi	Italy	Foggia	Ascoli	Loan
31 January 2012	Ivan Reali	Italy	Ascoli	Foggia	Loan
31 January 2012	Armando Izzo	Italy	Napoli	Avellino	Co-ownership
31 January 2012	Luis Pedro Cavanda	Belgium	Lazio	Bari	Loan
31 January 2012	Filippo Petterini	Italy	Pescara	Barletta	Undisclosed
31 January 2012	Andrea Russotto	Italy	Livorno	Carrarese	Loan
31 January 2012	Osarimen Ebagua	Italy	Torino (& Varese, c)	Catania	Loan
31 January 2012	Simone Ciancio	Italy	Alessandria	Cittadella	Undisclosed
31 January 2012	Tom	Brazil	(Brazil) Uberaba	Catania	Undisclosed
31 January 2012	Vincenzo Iaquinta	Italy	Juventus	Cesena	Loan
31 January 2012	Simone Del Nero	Italy	Lazio	Cesena	Loan
31 January 2012	Antonio Candreva	Italy	Udinese (on loan at Cesena)	Lazio	Loan
31 January 2012	Mario Santana	Argentina	Napoli	Cesena	Loan
31 January 2012	Filippo Perucchini	Italy	Milan (on loan at Lecco)	Chieti	Loan
31 January 2012	Luca Simeoni	Italy	Alessandria	Entella	Undisclosed (co-ownership with Livorno)
31 January 2012	Kenneth Zohore	Copenhagen (Denmark)	Fiorentina	€580,000	
31 January 2012	Cristian Cesaretti	Empoli	Frosinone	Loan	
31 January 2012	Gianluca Nicco	Pescara	Frosinone	Loan	
31 January 2012	Roger	Tombense (Brazil)	Genoa	Loan, €800,000	
31 January 2012	Fernando Belluschi	Porto (Portugal)	Genoa	Loan, Free	
31 January 2012	Benedetto Lorusso	Bari (at Valenzana, t)	Giacomense	Loan, Free	
31 January 2012	Sergio Viotti	Chievo (at Triestina, t)	Grosseto	Loan	
31 January 2012	Gianvito Misuraca	Vicenza	Grosseto	Loan	
31 January 2012	Gianluigi Bianco	Sampdoria (at Grosseto, t)	Vicenza	Loan	
31 January 2012	Fredy Guarín (Colombia)	(Portugal) Porto	Internazionale	Loan, €1.5M	
31 January 2012	Angelo Palombo	Sampdoria	Internazionale	Loan, €1M	
31 January 2012	Fabio Romeo	Pavia	Lecce	Co-ownership resolution, Undisclosed	
31 January 2012	Fabio Romeo	Lecce	Isola Liri	Loan	
31 January 2012	Simone Padoin	Atalanta	Juventus	€5M	
31 January 2012	Luca Di Matteo	Palermo	Lecce	Loan	
31 January 2012	Abdelkader Ghezzal	Bari (at Cesena, t)	Levante (Spain)	Loan	
31 January 2012	Piermario Morosini	Udinese	Livorno	Loan	
31 January 2012	Simone Sini	Roma (at Bari, t)	Livorno	Loan	
31 January 2012	Nestor Djengoue (Cameroon)	Chievo	Lumezzane	Loan	
31 January 2012	Kingsley Umunegbu (Nigeria)	Chiasso (Switzerland)	Milan	Loan	
31 January 2012	Thiago Motta	Internazionale	Paris Saint-Germain (France)	€7,179,487	
31 January 2012	Ahmed Barusso	Ghana	Roma	Nocerina	Loan
31 January 2012	Vincenzo De Liguori	Italy	Nocerina	Barletta	Loan
31 January 2012	Giuseppe Figliomeni	Italy	Varese	Nocerina	Loan, Swap
31 January 2012	Liberato Filosa	Italy	Nocerina	Como	Undisclosed
31 January 2012	Tomaso Nieddu	Italy	Como	Nocerina	Undisclosed
31 January 2012	Biagio Pagano	Italy	Torino	Nocerina	Loan
31 January 2012	Michelangelo Albertazzi	Italy	Milan	Varese	Loan
31 January 2012	Cristiano Ancora	Italy	Varese (at Latina, t)	Pavia	Loan
31 January 2012	Marco Cellini	Italy	Varese	Modena	Undisclosed
31 January 2012	Daniel Ferreira	Brazil	Varese	Foggia	Loan
31 January 2012	Pablo Granoche	Uruguay	Novara	Varese	Loan
31 January 2012	Gianvito Plasmati	Italy	Nocerina	Varese	Loan, Swap
31 January 2012	Rej Volpato	Livorno	Pergocrema	Free	
31 January 2012	Riccardo Capogna	Parma (at Renate, t)	Pro Patria	Loan (swap with Dalla Costa)	
31 January 2012	Marco Dalla Costa	Novara (at Pro Patria, t)	Renate	Loan (swap with Capogna)	
31 January 2012	Emanuele Belardi	Udinese	Reggina	Free	
31 January 2012	Simone Talpa	Fiorentina (youth)	Pro Vercelli	60,000	
31 January 2012	Marco Armellino	Sorrento	Reggina	Undisclosed	
31 January 2012	Gianni Munari	Fiorentina	Sampdoria	€800,000	
31 January 2012	Erjon Bogdani (Albania)	Cesena	Siena	Free	
31 January 2012	Piergiuseppe Maritato	Vicenza	Sorrento	Loan	
31 January 2012	Ettore Mendicino	Lazio (at Gubbio, t)	Taranto	Loan	
31 January 2012	Tomás Guzmán	Paraguay	Piacenza	Gubbio	Loan
31 January 2012	David Löfquist	Sweden	Parma	Gubbio	Loan
31 January 2012	Daniel Bradaschia	Lumezzane (& Udinese, c)	Taranto (& Udinese, c)	Undisclosed (transfer of co-ownership)	
31 January 2012	Salvatore Masiello	Bari	Torino	Free	

== Out of window transfer ==
Date	Name	Nationality	Moving from	Moving to	Fee
11 February 2012	Raffaele De Martino	Italy	Unattached (Nocerina)	Paganese	Free
17 February 2012	Gabriele Aldegani	Italy	Unattached	Nocerina	Free
5 March 2012	Reginaldo	Brazil	Siena	(Japan) JEF United	Loan
8 March 2012	Paolo Tornaghi	Italy	Internazionale	(United States) Chicago Fire	Free
