= 2005–06 Reggina Calcio season =

Reggina
2005–06 season
- Chairman: Pasquale Foti
- Manager: Walter Mazzarri
- Serie A: 13th
- Coppa Italia: 2nd Round
- Top goalscorer: Nicola Amoruso (11)

Reggina Calcio extended its stay in Serie A by a further season, despite being charged with involvement in Calciopoli at the end of the term. Reggina was allowed to retain its Serie A status, but was demoted eleven points out of its 2006-07 campaign, leading to the general consensus that its time in the top-flight division was running out, given that it had only sealed its Serie A stays by the shallowest of margins before.

== Squad ==
=== Goalkeepers ===
- (Italy) Ivan Pelizzoli
- (Italy) Nicola Pavarini
- (Italy) Antonino Saviano
- (Italy) Pietro Marino

=== Defenders ===
- (Italy) Juriy Cannarsa
- (Italy) Antonio Giosa
- (Italy) Alessandro Lucarelli
- (Italy) Ivan Franceschini
- (Italy) Francesco Modesto
- (Italy) Gaetano De Rosa
- (Italy) Gaetano Ungaro
- (Italy) Maurizio Lanzaro

=== Midfielders ===
- (Paraguay) Carlos Paredes
- (Brazil) Bruno Lança de Andrade
- (Italy) Luca Rigoni
- (Italy) Davide Biondini
- (Italy) Francesco Cozza
- (Italy) Luca Vigiani
- (Italy) Giacomo Tedesco
- (Italy) Giandomenico Mesto
- (Italy) Filippo Carobbio
- (Italy) Ivan Castiglia
- (Italy) Antonino Barillà
- (Italy) Demetrio Cutrupi
- (Italy) Simone Missiroli

=== Attackers ===
- (Italy) Rolando Bianchi
- (Italy) Nicola Amoruso
- (Greece) Lampros Choutos
- (Italy) Fabio Ceravolo
- (Uzbekistan) Ilyos Zeytulayev
- (Italy) Simone Cavalli

== Serie A ==
Pos	Team	Pld	W	D	L	GF	GA	GD	Pts
11	Udinese	38	11	10	17	40	54	−14	43
12	Sampdoria	38	10	11	17	47	51	−4	41
13	Reggina	38	11	8	19	39	65	−26	41
14	Cagliari	38	8	15	15	42	55	−13	39
15	Siena	38	9	12	17	42	60	−18	39

Source: 2005–06 Serie A, Soccerway
Rules for classification: 1) points; 2) goal difference; 3) number of goals scored.

=== Matches ===
- Reggina-Roma 0-3
- 0-1 Mancini (30)
- 0-2 Daniele De Rossi (46)
- 0-3 Shabani Nonda (90 + 2)
- Sampdoria-Reggina 3-2
- 1-0 Emiliano Bonazzoli (18)
- 1-1 Francesco Cozza (28)
- 2-1 Sergio Volpi (58)
- 3-1 Andrea Gasbarroni (85)
- 3-2 Simone Missiroli (90 + 3)
- Reggina-Chievo 1-3
- 1-0 Francesco Cozza (11)
- 1-1 Daniele Franceschini (19)
- 1-2 Daniele Franceschini (64)
- 1-3 Davide Mandelli (77)
- Palermo-Reggina 1-0
- 1-0 Christian Terlizzi (66)
- Reggina-Udinese 2-0
- 1-0 Francesco Cozza (42)
- 2-0 Simone Cavalli (76)
- Milan-Reggina 2-1
- 1-0 Paolo Maldini (5)
- 2-0 Paolo Maldini (20)
- 2-1 Simone Cavalli (90 + 2)
- Reggina-Lecce 2-0
- 1-0 Giacomo Tedesco (14)
- 2-0 Francesco Cozza (52)
- Livorno-Reggina 1-0
- 1-0 Cristiano Lucarelli (87)
- Reggina-Treviso 1-2
- 0-1 Luigi Beghetto (18)
- 0-2 Francesco Parravicini (78)
- 1-2 Simone Missiroli (86)
- Reggina-Lazio 1-0
- 1-0 Luciano Zauri (78 og)
- Empoli-Reggina 3-0
- 1-0 Christian Riganò (7)
- 2-0 Francesco Tavano (67)
- 3-0 Ighli Vannucchi (90 + 4)
- Reggina-Cagliari 3-1
- 1-0 Nicola Amoruso (2)
- 2-0 Francesco Cozza (38)
- 2-1 Nelson Abeijón (67)
- 3-1 Carlos Paredes (81)
- Siena-Reggina 0-0
- Reggina-Parma 2-1
- 1-0 Francesco Cozza (10)
- 1-1 Giuseppe Cardone (13)
- 2-1 Gaetano De Rosa (21)
- Ascoli-Reggina 1-1
- 1-0 Michele Fini (60)
- 1-1 Carlos Paredes (88)
- Reggina-Inter 0-4
- 0-1 Iván Córdoba (2)
- 0-2 Obafemi Martins (15)
- 0-3 Adriano (40)
- 0-4 David Pizarro (90 + 2)
- Messina-Reggina 1-1
- 1-0 Arturo Di Napoli (25)
- 1-1 Francesco Cozza (86)
- Reggina-Fiorentina 1-1
- 1-0 Alessandro Lucarelli (12)
- 1-1 Martin Jørgensen (13)
- Juventus-Reggina 1-0
- 1-0 Alessandro Del Piero (45)
- Roma-Reggina 3-1
- 1-0 Francesco Totti (4)
- 2-0 Francesco Totti (65)
- 2-1 Ivan Franceschini (90 + 1)
- 3-1 Mancini (90 + 3)
- Reggina-Sampdoria 2-1
- 1-0 Carlos Paredes (7)
- 1-1 Vitali Kutuzov (44)
- 2-1 Nicola Amoruso (46 pen)
- Chievo-Reggina 4-0
- 1-0 Amauri (2)
- 2-0 Sergio Pellissier (30)
- 3-0 Amauri (43 pen)
- 4-0 Sergio Pellissier (90 + 4)
- Reggina-Palermo 2-2
- 0-1 Simone Barone (42)
- 1-1 Gaetano De Rosa (45 + 4)
- 1-2 Andrea Caracciolo (80)
- 2-2 Carlos Paredes (90 + 2)
- Udinese-Reggina 1-2
- 1-0 Vincenzo Iaquinta (15)
- 1-1 Nicola Amoruso (46)
- 1-2 Nicola Amoruso (61)
- Reggina-Milan 1-4
- 1-0 Carlos Paredes (9)
- 1-1 Filippo Inzaghi (14)
- 1-2 Alberto Gilardino (37)
- 1-3 Filippo Inzaghi (52)
- 1-4 Filippo Inzaghi (90 + 3)
- Lecce-Reggina 0-0
- Reggina-Livorno 1-1
- 0-1 Stefano Morrone (46)
- 1-1 Francesco Cozza (63)
- Treviso-Reggina 0-1
- 0-1 Nicola Amoruso (90 + 4)
- Lazio-Reggina 3-1
- 1-0 Paolo Di Canio (25)
- 2-0 Tommaso Rocchi (36)
- 3-0 Goran Pandev (68)
- 3-1 Nicola Amoruso (69)
- Reggina-Empoli 0-2
- 0-1 Nicola Pozzi (62)
- 0-2 Francesco Tavano (82)
- Cagliari-Reggina 0-2
- 0-1 Alessandro Lucarelli (8)
- 0-2 Giacomo Tedesco (20)
- Reggina-Siena 1-1
- 0-1 Erjon Bogdani (21)
- 1-1 Nicola Amoruso (51)
- Parma-Reggina 4-0
- 1-0 Mark Bresciano (12)
- 2-0 Fábio Simplício (34)
- 3-0 Matteo Contini (66 pen)
- 4-0 Daniele Dessena (79)
- Reggina-Ascoli 2-0
- 1-0 Gaetano De Rosa (10)
- 2-0 Nicola Amoruso (27)
- Inter-Reggina 4-0
- 1-0 Julio Cruz (16)
- 2-0 Obafemi Martins (23)
- 3-0 César (28)
- 4-0 Julio Cruz (90 + 2)
- Reggina-Messina 3-0
- 1-0 Francesco Cozza (51)
- 2-0 Nicola Amoruso (57 pen)
- 3-0 Rolando Bianchi (76)
- Fiorentina-Reggina 5-2
- 1-0 Stefano Fiore (25)
- 2-0 Luca Toni (28)
- 3-0 Martin Jørgensen (35)
- 4-0 Luca Toni (64)
- 5-0 Valeri Bojinov (65)
- 5-1 Nicola Amoruso (81)
- 5-2 Nicola Amoruso (84 pen)
- Reggina-Juventus 0-2
- 0-1 David Trezeguet (23)
- 0-2 Alessandro Del Piero (90 + 1)

=== Topscorers ===
- (Italy) Nicola Amoruso 11
- (Italy) Francesco Cozza 9
- (Paraguay) Carlos Paredes 5
- (Italy) Gaetano De Rosa 3
