= Filippo Capitanio =

Italian footballer

Personal information
- Date of birth: 26 April 1993 (age 33)
- Place of birth: Vicenza, Italy
- Height: 1.88 m (6 ft 2 in)
- Position: Centre back

Team information
- Current team: ASD Chiampo 1964

Youth career
- –2012: Vicenza
- 2009–2011: → Sampdoria (loan)

Senior career*
Years	Team	Apps	(Gls)
2012–2013	Vicenza	1	(0)
2012–2013	→ Pontedera (loan)	29	(0)
2013–2016	Cesena	0	(0)
2013–2014	→ Reggiana (loan)	1	(0)
2014	→ Como (loan)	4	(0)
2014–2016	→ Santarcangelo (loan)	47	(0)
2016–2017	Teramo	8	(1)
2017	Santarcangelo	3	(0)
2017–2018	Ravenna	20	(0)
2018–2019	Avellino	11	(1)
2019–2020	Adriese	11	(0)
2021	Vastese	14	(1)
2021–2022	Forlì	19	(1)
2022–2023	Unione La Rocca Altavilla		
2024–	ASD Chiampo 1964		
- * Club domestic league appearances and goals as of 19:27, 21 October 2026 (UTC)

Filippo Capitanio (born 26 April 1993) is an Italian footballer who plays as a centre back for ASD Chiampo 1964.

== Biography ==
=== Vicenza ===
Born in Vicenza, Veneto, Capitanio started his professional career at Vicenza Calcio; he was the member of the youth squad such as the under-14 team in Veneto "Giovanissimi" League Second Division in 2006–07 season. He also spent 2010–11 season with the under-20 team (the reserve) of Sampdoria as well as the under-17 team in the 2009–10 season. Capitanio was awarded no.93 shirt of the first team in 2011–12 Serie B, for Vicenza. Capitanio played for Vicenza mostly in friendlies.

He made his competitive debut in the last round of the season, losing to Pescara 0–6. He also played a few friendlies for Vicenza in May in order to prepare for the relegation "play-out" game against Empoli. Eventually Vicenza relegated as the losing side. (However, in the eve of 2012–13 Serie B, Vicenza was re-admitted as U.S. Lecce was expelled from the second division.)

Despite Vicenza relegated, the club decided to transfer Capitanio to Pontedera, the newcomer of the fourth division, along with Marco Ortolan. Pontedera promoted to the third division as the runner-up of fourth division group B. Co-currently, Vicenza relegated again from Serie B as well as Cesena failed to enter promotion play-offs in order go back to Serie A.

=== Cesena ===
Once again Cesena and Vicenza made swap deal in order to strengthen the squad, as risky investment as well as boosting financial result in June 2013, as the club did in June 2010 (Tonucci–Tulli, both for €1.3M; Righini–Evangelisti, both for €0.45M) and June 2011 (Tonelli–Bonicelli, both for €0.6M). On 29 June 2013, the second last day of the financial year of both clubs, Capitanio, a defender, was transferred to Cesena in co-ownership deal from Vicenza, and Mattia Filippi, a midfielder, was transferred to Vicenza from Cesena also in co-ownership. Half of the card of both players were valued €450,000. However, Cesena nor Vicenza never announced the transfer of Capitanio, only Lega Serie B did in its transfer list on the web site; Vicenza announced Filippi's deal after they successfully submit enough financial documents to Lega Pro in order to apply for the license for 2013–14 Lega Pro Prima Divisione. However Cesena also did not announce the deal of Filippi. Filippi was able to secure a place in Vicenza's pre-season camp, however Capitanio had followed the footsteps of Evangelisti and Tulli, which Capitanio was immediately left for Reggiana in temporary deal after his vacation. Capitanio signed a 4-year contract.

On 31 January 2014 he was signed by Como.

==== Santarcangelo (loan) ====
In summer 2014 he was signed by Santarcangelo, which he was featured in the pre-season match against Cesena. In 2015 pre-season, he also played for Santarcangelo against Cesena, along with Davide Adorni who also loaned from Cesena.

=== Serie C clubs ===
On 17 August 2016 Capitanio was signed by Teramo on a definitive deal from Cesena. He also signed a 2-year contract. On 31 January 2017 Capitanio returned to Santarcangelo.

Capitanio joined Ravenna in July 2017.
