= Luca Righini =

Italian footballer (born 1990)

Personal information
- Date of birth: 25 December 1990 (age 35)
- Place of birth: Cesena, Italy
- Height: 1.78 m (5 ft 10 in)
- Position: Midfielder

Team information
- Current team: Bellaria Igea Marina 1956

Youth career
- Cesena

Senior career*
Years	Team	Apps	(Gls)
2009–2010	Cesena	1	(0)
2010–2012	Vicenza	0	(0)
2010–2011	→ Mezzocorona (loan)	22	(0)
2011–2012	→ Valenzana (loan)	32	(1)
2012–2013	Cesena	0	(0)
2012–2013	→ Teramo (loan)	18	(0)
2013–2015	Imolese	54	(2)
2015–2016	Ravenna	32	(1)
2016–2018	Rimini	61	(2)
2018–2020	La Fiorita	37	(8)
2020–2021	Libertas	13	(3)
2021–2025	Tre Penne	96	(24)
2025–	Bellaria Igea Marina 1956		
- * Club domestic league appearances and goals as of 10 February 2026

Luca Righini (born 25 December 1990) is an Italian professional footballer who plays as a midfielder for Bellaria Igea Marina 1956.

== Career ==
=== Cesena ===
Born in Cesena, Emilia–Romagna, Righini started his career at A.C. Cesena. In 2006–07 season he was the member of Cesena's Allievi U17 team. From 2007 to 2010 he played for the reserve in the "spring" league.

Righini played once for the first team in January 2009.

=== Cesena–Vicenza swap ===
On 30 June 2010, the last day of 2009–10 financial year, Righini along with Denis Tonucci was sold to Serie B club Vicenza, for €450,000 and €1.3 million respectively. In exchange, Mattia Evangelisti and Giacomo Tulli were signed by Cesena also for the same price. Both clubs retained 50% registration rights. The deal created paper profit for the clubs in 2009–10 financial year but heavy cost in future seasons. (Note: On that day, Cesena had a positive net asset of €2,867,115, which boosted by the player profit (youth product did not have an asset value), despite only in form of increase in intangible asset (namely Tulli (€2.6M), Galuppo (€2.2M) and Evangelisti (€0.9M)), and successfully passed the financial test for 2011–12 Serie A. On Vicenza side, the €5,171,680 net equity was boosted by Tonucci (€2.6M) Benedetti (€2M), Righini (€0.9M) and Mandorlini (€0.8M), as well as the residual value of the risky signing of the previous year: Giacomo Di Donato for €800,000. Except Tonucci, none of the players played for their new club, and Vicenza sold its Italian youth internationals Davide Brivio for just €1.5 million.)

=== Lega Pro loans ===
On 31 August 2010 Righini left for Mezzocorona in temporary deal. The club also signed Filippo Forò from Vicenza and Ivan Reali from Ascoli, who sold from Vicenza in June 2010 for a flopped €0.8M. Righini played 22 games, including 14 starts for the fourth division club. In the end of 2010–11 Lega Pro Seconda Divisione the club relegated. In June 2011, Cesena and Vicenza renewed the four co-ownership deals. In July 2011 Righini left for another fourth division club Valenzana. However his clubs relegated again, including Cesena, Vicenza and Valenzana.

=== Cesena return ===
In June 2012 Cesena bought back Righini and Tonucci for €225,000 and €650,000 respectively; co-currently Evangelisti and Tulli returned to Vicenza also for €225,000 and €650,000. Except Tulli, all other 3 players were signed a 1-year contract. However, Righini was not included in the pre-season camp. His contract was extended to 30 June 2014, however.

Righini later was confirmed as a player of Teramo in temporary deal. He was released by Cesena on circa summer 2013, which reflected as a loss on 2013–14 financial year in the company audit report.
