= Giacomo Tulli =

Italian footballer (born 1987)

Personal information
- Date of birth: 24 October 1987 (age 39)
- Place of birth: Fermo, Italy
- Height: 1.71 m (5 ft 7 1/2 in)
- Positions: Forward; winger

Team information
- Current team: Sangiustese

Youth career
- Fermana

Senior career*
Years	Team	Apps	(Gls)
2005–2006	Fermana	1	(0)
2006–2009	Sambenedettese	5	(0)
2008–2009	→ Mezzocorona (loan)	31	(12)
2009–2010	Vicenza	0	(0)
2009–2010	→ Rimini (loan)	31	(7)
2010–2012	Cesena	0	(0)
2010–2012	→ Vicenza (loan)	24	(1)
2012	→ Pisa (loan)	12	(4)
2012–2014	Vicenza	27	(5)
2012–2013	→ Pisa (loan)	27	(7)
2014–2015	Ancona	32	(6)
2015–2017	Südtirol	64	(11)
2017–2018	Teramo	28	(1)
2018–2020	Trapani	43	(7)
2020	Catanzaro	6	(5)
2020–2021	Feralpisalò	20	(2)
2021–2023	Fidelis Andria	26	(1)
2023	→ Imolese (loan)	9	(1)
2023–	Sangiustese	0	(0)
- * Club domestic league appearances and goals as of 23 April 2023

Giacomo Tulli (born 24 October 1987) is an Italian footballer who plays as a forward or winger for Sangiustese.

== Career ==
Born in Fermo, Marche, Tulli started his career at hometown club Fermana. In mid-2006, he left for Sambenedettese along with Filippo Forò, another Marche club. He only able to play 5 times for the first team and also played for San Benedetto's under-20 team as overage player in 2007–08 season. In 2008–09 season, Tulli played for Mezzocorona. In his first ever Lega Pro Seconda Divisione (Italian fourth highest level at that time), Tulli scored 12 goals.

=== Vicenza ===
At the end of the season, Sambenedettese went bankrupted; Tulli was signed by Serie B club Vicenza on a free transfer, along with the re-signing of Stefano Pietribiasi and Marco Zentil at Vicenza, Tulli re-joined Forò. In August 2009, he left for Italian third division club Rimini. The club reached the first round of promotion playoff but lost to Verona. After the season Rimini bankrupted and a new entity was admitted to Serie D.

=== Cesena (2010–12) ===
On 30 June 2010, the last day of financial year of Serie A newcomer A.C. Cesena and Vicenza Calcio, Tulli along with Mattia Evangelisti (both former Sambenedettese player) were sold to Cesena in co-ownership deal, for €1.3 million and €450,000 respectively; on the same day Vicenza signed Denis Tonucci and Luca Righini also in co-ownership deal also for €1.3 million and €450,000 respectively. However, Tulli was loaned back to Vicenza for two seasons and two youngster Evangelisti and Righini left for Lega Pro teams in 2010–11 and 2011–12 season.

It made Cesena and Vicenza had paper selling profit in 2009–10 season but heavy cost in future season. (Note: Vicenza Calcio had a positive net equity on 30 June 2010 of €5,171,680, however the club main asset, the intangible one, was composite with Benedetti (€2M), Tonucci (€2.6M), Righini (€0.9M), Mandorlini (€0.8M), all signed by player exchange and days before the closure of the financial year, as well as the residual value of the risky signing of the previous year: Giacomo Di Donato for €800,000. Except Tonucci, none of the players actually played for Vicenza and Vicenza sold its youth internationals defender Davide Brivio for just €1.5 million.) Tulli wore no.11 shirt for Vicenza since 2010–11 season.

The four co-ownership deal also renewed in June 2011. On 3 January 2012, the first day of winter transfer window, Tulli was loaned back to third division for Pisa.

Tulli made his debut on 8 January 2012, partnering with Raffaele Perna.

=== Return to Vicenza ===
After Cesena and Vicenza relegated in June 2012, Cesena bought back Tonucci for €650,000 and Righini for €225,000; Vicenza also bought back Tulli for €650,000 and Evangelisti for €225,000. Except Tulli who signed a 2-year contract, all other 3 players were signed a 1-year deal. On 12 July 2012 his loan to Pisa was renewed. On 17 July 2013, he received a call-up to Vicenza Calcio's pre-season camp, as the club had relegated and nearly failed to register for 2013–14 Lega Pro Prima Divisione.

=== Ancona ===
- On 9 July 2014, he was signed by Ancona.

=== Südtirol ===
- On 13 July 2015, he was signed by Südtirol in a 2-year contract.

=== Trapani ===
- On 21 January 2020, his contract with Serie B club Trapani was terminated by mutual consent.

=== Serie C ===
- On 21 January 2020, he signed a 1.5-year contract with Catanzaro in Serie C. On 5 October 2020, he moved to Feralpisalò.
- On 31 August 2021, he joined to Fidelis Andria 2018. On 31 January 2023, Tulli was loaned by Imolese.
