= Minieri =

Minieri is an Italian surname. Notable people with the surname include:

- Dario Minieri (born 1985), Italian poker player
- Mario Minieri (born 1938), Italian cyclist
- Michelangelo Minieri (born 1981), Italian footballer
