= Orlando Urbano =

Italian footballer

Personal information
- Date of birth: 9 June 1984 (age 42)
- Place of birth: Ruviano, Italy
- Height: 1.82 m (5 ft 11 1/2 in)
- Position: Centre back

Youth career
- 2001–2004: Juventus

Senior career*
Years	Team	Apps	(Gls)
2004–2007	Juventus	0	(0)
2004–2005	→ Reggiana (loan)	7	(0)
2005	→ Pavia (loan)	9	(0)
2005–2006	→ Torres (loan)	1	(0)
2006	→ Catanzaro (loan)	13	(0)
2007–2008	Potenza	29	(1)
2008–2009	Pro Patria	31	(2)
2009–2010	Vicenza	5	(0)
2010	→ Perugia (loan)	7	(0)
2011	Paganese	15	(1)
2011–2012	Como	31	(2)
2012–2017	Lugano	126	(12)
2017–2018	Chiasso	20	(2)
2018–2019	Varese		
Total		294	(20)
- * Club domestic league appearances and goals

Orlando Urbano (born 9 June 1984) is an Italian former footballer who plays as a centre back.

== Club career ==
=== Juventus ===
Urbano started his career with Italian powerhouse Juventus FC, where he played for the club's youth sector. In 2004, he graduated from the Juventus youth system along with several other future prospects. For the first half of the 2004–2005 season, Juventus loaned the 19-year-old Urbano out to A.C. Reggiana, in the Italian third division, in order for him to gain experience at a professional level. With Reggiana, he managed 7 appearances as a center defender, his natural position. For the next six-months of the 2004–05 season, Juventus loaned him out to A.C. Pavia, where he would account for nine total appearances. He would then join Sassari Torres, where he did not manage a single start, and thus was re-called to Juve and loaned back out to Catanzaro. He would make 13 total appearances for the Catanzaro based club.

=== Potenza S.C. ===
The following season, he returned to Juventus, but in an entire season, made not a single appearance and due to poor performances and lack of experience, Juventus terminated the 23-year-old's contract. He was signed on a free transfer for the 2007–08 season by Serie C1 side Potenza S.C. With Potenza, Urbano became a first choice defender for the club in the Lega Pro Prima Divisione, and he went on to make 29 league appearances during the season, also netting a single goal. Despite the positive experience with the southern club, Urbano was sold in the summer of 2008 to third division club, Pro Patria.

=== Pro Patria ===
Following his official transfer to Pro Patria for the 2008–09 season, Urbano again earned a starting position within the club's back line, and would go on to help them to a promotion playoff position in the former Serie C1 by finishing second in the league table. Unfortunately for the club, they would end up remaining in the third tier due to their loss in the promotion playoff final. Urbano scored 2 goals in 31 league appearances that season.

=== Vicenza Calcio ===
In the summer of 2009, he transferred from Pro Patria to Serie B side Vicenza Calcio, after an impressive 2008–09 Lega Pro Prima Divisione season. Urbano, however, had very limited chances in Vicenza and left on loan for Perugia Calcio in January 2010, along with team-mates Giampietro Perrulli and Filippo Forò. With Perugia, Urbano made just 7 appearances during the course of his 5-month tenure.

=== Return to Lega Pro ===
Following his return to Vicenza in the summer of 2010, Urbano's contract expired and therefore, he became a free agent. He failed to find a club until January 2011, when he joined Paganese in the Lega Pro Seconda Divisione. In his short 6-month spell with the Campania-based club, the defender made 15 league appearances and netted 1 goal. His performances attracted interest from Calcio Como, who eventually signed the player on 24 July 2011 for an undisclosed transfer fee. In his first season with the club, Urbano earned regular playing time once more, and made 31 league appearances and scored 2 goals for his new club. Como went on to place 13th in the Lega Pro Prima Divisione.
