= Marsili (surname) =

Marsili is a surname of Italian origin. Notable people with the surname include:

- Luigi Ferdinando Marsili (1658 – 1730), Italian soldier and natural scientist
- Massimiliano Marsili (born 1987), Italian footballer
- Pere Marsili, Dominican friar, chronicler, translator, and royal ambassador
- Sante Marsili (1950 – 2024), Italian water polo player
