= Rodrigo Silva =

Rodrigo Silva may refer to:

- Rodrigo Augusto da Silva (1833-1889), Brazilian politician, diplomat and lawyer
- Rodrigo Silva (footballer, born 1982), Brazilian football forward
- Rodrigo Silva (footballer, born 1987), Brazilian football attacking midfielder
- Rodrigo da Silva (footballer) (born 1988), Brazilian football forward
- Rodrigo Silva (rugby union) (born 1992), Uruguayan rugby union player
