= Matteo Cavagna =

Matteo Cavagna may refer to:

- Matteo Cavagna (footballer, born 1984), Italian former footballer
- Matteo Cavagna (footballer, born 1985), Italian former footballer
