= Nicola Padoin =

Italian footballer

Personal information
- Date of birth: 24 February 1979 (age 47)
- Place of birth: Montebelluna, Italy
- Height: 1.84 m (6 ft 0 in)
- Position: Midfielder

Team information
- Current team: Spezia (academy coordinator)

Youth career
- Milan

Senior career*
Years	Team	Apps	(Gls)
1999–2004	Prato	126	(7)
2003	→ Empoli (loan)	2	(0)
2004–2005	Sanremese	25	(1)
2005–2008	Spezia	68	(6)
2008–2009	Reggiana	18	(1)
2009–2011	Spezia	51	(3)
2011	Lecco	10	(0)
2012–2013	Foligno	17	(0)
Total		317	(18)

International career
1996	Italy U17	2	(1)
1996	Italy U18	2	(0)
- * Club domestic league appearances and goals

Nicola Padoin (born 24 February 1979) is a Italian former professional footballer who is currently as a academy coordinator for Spezia.

== Club career ==
Padoin left for Empoli F.C. in co-ownership deal in 1999 from A.C. Milan.

He played two games in the 2002–03 Serie A for Empoli F.C.

In the 2006–07 Serie B his dramatic winning goal in the 91st minute of the last regular season game against Juventus FC saved Spezia Calcio from relegation.

On 31 August 2009 Padoin returned to Spezia Calcio. On 21 October 2011 Padoin was signed by Calcio Lecco 1912. On 30 December 2011 Padoin left for Foligno. Lecco got Paolo Castellazzi, Matteo Cavagna and Ivan Merli Sala in exchange.
