= Mattia Filippi =

Italian footballer

Personal information
- Date of birth: 9 May 1993 (age 33)
- Place of birth: Lugo, Italy
- Height: 1.76 m (5 ft 9 1/2 in)
- Position: Forward

Youth career
- ?–2012: Cesena

Senior career*
Years	Team	Apps	(Gls)
2012–2013	Cesena	4	(0)
2012–2013	→ Forlì (loan)	17	(4)
2013–2015	Vicenza	2	(0)
- * Club domestic league appearances and goals as of 30 June 2015

Mattia Filippi (born 9 May 1993) is an Italian footballer who plays as a forward.

== Career ==
Filippi started his career at Cesena. He played for its Allievi U17 youth team from 2008 to 2010. Since 2010 Filippi was the member of the reserve. He scored 7 goals in 2011–12 Campionato Nazionale Primavera as team top-scorer.

Filippi made his first team debut on 7 April 2012, substituted Simone Del Nero in 64th minute. In June 2012 Filippi played hisd only game for Italy U20, against Serie D Best XI.

In July 2012 he left for Forlì along with Leonardo Arrigoni. In the next summer he was involved with the signing of Filippo Capitanio, which saw Filippi was sold from Cesena to Vicenza; both clubs retained 50% registration rights of Capitanio and Filippi respectively. Filippi signed a 5-year contract. Filippi only played twice in 2013–14 Lega Pro Prima Divisione.

In June 2014 the remaining 50% registration rights of Filippi and Capitanio were transferred to Vicenza and Cesena respectively for free.

Filippi wore.15 shirt in 2014–15 Serie B for Vicenza. In summer 2015, Filippi was released by Vicenza as a free agent 3 years earlier.
