= Paolo Castellazzi =

Italian footballer

Personal information
- Date of birth: 4 July 1987 (age 39)
- Place of birth: Treviglio, Italy
- Height: 1.75 m (5 ft 9 in)
- Position: Midfielder

Youth career
- Alzano
- Torino
- 2005–2007: Sampdoria

Senior career*
| Years | Team | Apps | (Gls) |
| 2007–2009 | Sampdoria | 0 | (0) |
| 2007–2008 | → Pro Patria (loan) | 21 | (1) |
| 2008–2009 | → Ternana (loan) | 0 | (0) |
| 2009 | → SPAL (loan) | 2 | (0) |
| 2009–2012 | Foligno | 60 | (2) |
| 2012 | Lecco | 4 | (0) |
| 2012–2013 | Voluntas Spoleto | 15 | (1) |
| 2013–2014 | Orsa Iseo 1946 | | |
| 2014–2015 | CS Trevigliese | | |
| Total | | 102 | (4) |
- * Club domestic league appearances and goals

Paolo Castellazzi (born 4 July 1987) is a Italian former footballer who plays as a midfielder.

== Biography ==
Born in Treviglio, Lombardy, Castellazzi started his career at Torino Calcio. Due to financial difficulty, the team originally promoted to Serie A in 2005 but expelled, a new entity, Torino F.C. was formed and re-admitted to 2005–06 Serie B (article 52 of N.O.I.F.), however, the contract with the old entity became void and Castellazzi was signed by Sampdoria along with Pasquale Schiattarella instead of signing new contract with the new company. He played 2 seasons with the Genoese's youth team.

In July 2007 he left for Pro Patria. He left for Ternana along with Stefano Scappini in the next season. He was released by Ternana and loaned to SPAL in January 2009. He was signed by Foligno in co-ownership deal in July 2009, for a peppercorn fee of €500. In June 2011 Sampdoria gave up the remain 50% registration rights to Foligno. Castellazzi only played 9 times for Foligno in the first half of 2011–12 Lega Pro Prima Divisione.

On 30 December 2011 the club formed a deal with Lecco, which the club sold Nicola Padoin to Foligno. At the same time Lecco got Castellazzi, Matteo Cavagna and Ivan Merli Sala.
