= Filippo Forò =

Italian footballer (born 1987)

Personal information
- Date of birth: 22 December 1987 (age 38)
- Place of birth: Civitanova Marche, Italy
- Height: 1.72 m (5 ft 8 in)
- Position: Midfielder

Team information
- Current team: Porto S'Elpidio

Youth career
- –2006: Fermana

Senior career*
Years	Team	Apps	(Gls)
2005–2006	Fermana		(0)
2006–2009	Sambenedettese	32	(3)
2009–2013	Vicenza	2	(0)
2010	→ Perugia (loan)	4	(0)
2010–2011	→ Mezzocorona (loan)	24	(1)
2011–2012	→ Triestina (loan)	10	(0)
2013	Termoli	13	(1)
2014	Fermana	14	(0)
2014–2015	Montegiorgio	23	(2)
2015	Vis Pesaro	11	(0)
2015–2017	Fermana	34	(0)
2017–2018	Fabriano Cerreto	13	(1)
2018	Città di Giulianova	14	(0)
2018–2019	Gravina	15	(0)
2019–2020	Castelnuovo Vomano		
2020–2022	Sangiustese		
2022–2023	Palmense		
2023–	Porto S'Elpidio		
- * Club domestic league appearances and goals as of 01:59, 28 January 2020 (UTC)

Filippo Forò (born 22 December 1987) is an Italian footballer who plays as a midfielder for Porto S'Elpidio.

== Career ==
Born in Civitanova Marche, Marche, Forò started his career at Marche team Fermana. In mid-2006 he was signed by Sambenedettese along with Giacomo Tulli. In January 2009, Forò (€150,000), along with 3 other players, namely Mattia Evangelisti (€100,000), Gianmarco Piccioni (€100,000) and German Pomiro (€100,000) were sold to Serie B club Vicenza. The Marche club got Stefano Pietribiasi and Marco Zentil in exchange, for €300,000 in total. The two clubs also retained 50% registration rights on 6 players. Forò signed a 4 1/2-year contract and also returned to San Benedetto for the rest of season. The co-ownership deals were renewed except Evangelisti and Zentil in June 2009. However Sambenedettese soon bankrupted and Vicenza bought back Zentil, Pietribiasi as well as signing Tulli on free transfer.

Forò only able to play twice in 2009–10 Serie B. In mid-season he returned to Italian third division for Perugia along with Giampietro Perrulli and Orlando Urbano. Vicenza also signed Fabio Gatti in exchange.

During the 2010–11 season he was loaned to Mezzocorona, joining former Vicenza team-mate Ivan Reali. On 31 August 2011 he was signed by another third division club Triestina, and Vicenza also signed Marco Franceschin and Davide Bariti.
