= Ivan Merli Sala =

Italian footballer

Personal information
- Date of birth: 8 February 1989 (age 37)
- Place of birth: Segrate, Italy
- Height: 1.87 m (6 ft 2 in)
- Position: Centre back

Youth career
- Belluno
- 2006–2008: Treviso

Senior career*
Years	Team	Apps	(Gls)
2008–2009	Viterbese	13	(0)
2009–2010	Cassino	29	(1)
2010–2012	Foligno	35	(0)
2012	Lecco	18	(1)
2012–2013	Fano	26	(0)
2013–2015	Belluno	64	(5)
2015–2016	Seregno	37	(2)
2016	Altovicentino	12	(0)
2016–2017	Seregno	18	(0)
2017–2022	Lecco	129	(6)
2022–2024	Olginatese		
- * Club domestic league appearances and goals as of 8 October 2026

Ivan Merli Sala (born 8 February 1989) is an Italian footballer who plays as a centre back.

== Club career ==
Born in Segrate, the Province of Milan, Lombardy, Merli Sala was signed by Veneto club Treviso in January 2006 from another Veneto club Belluno. Since 2006–07 season he played for its under-20 team.

Merli Sala made his senior debut with Serie D club Viterbese in 2008–09 Serie D. In mid-2009 he returned to professional league for Cassino. That season he was selected to Lega Pro Seconda Divisione Group C under-21 representative team in 2010 Lega Pro Quadrangular Tournament. Eventually Group C was the fourth. Cassino bankrupted at the end of season. In July 2010 he was signed by Serie A club Chievo on free transfer. He was immediately farmed to Italian third division club Foligno in co-ownership deal, for a peppercorn fee of €100. Merli Sala made 24 starts in the first season but only played 8 times in 2011–12 Lega Pro Prima Divisione. On 30 December 2011 the club formed a deal with Lecco, which the club sold Nicola Padoin to Foligno. At the same time Lecco got Paolo Castellazzi, Matteo Cavagna and Merli Sala. In June 2012 Chievo gave up the remain 50% registration rights.

In summer 2012 he was signed by Fano in 2-year contract. After the club relegated, he was signed by another Serie D club Belluno.

He rejoined Lecco in the summer of 2017 in Serie D. On 11 July 2019, following Lecco's promotion to Serie C, he extended his contract by another year.

On 4 July 2022, Merli Sala left Lecco after five seasons and signed with Olginatese.
