= Rigoni =

Rigoni is an Italian surname. Notable people with the surname include:

- Alberto Rigoni, Italian bass guitarist and composer
- Beatrice Rigoni (born 1995), Italian rugby union player
- Benito Rigoni (1936–2021), Italian bobsledder
- Emiliano Rigoni (born 1993), Argentine footballer
- Gianluigi Rigoni (born 1956), Italian footballer
- Guy Rigoni (born 1974), Australian rules footballer
- Luca Rigoni (born 1984), Italian footballer
- Marco Rigoni (born 1980), Italian footballer
- Mario Rigoni Stern (1921–2008), Italian writer
- Mario Andrea Rigoni (1948–2021), Italian writer
- Massimo Rigoni (born 1961), Italian ski jumper
- Nicola Rigoni (born 1990), Italian footballer
- Sergio Rigoni (born 1986), Italian cross-country skier
- Severino Rigoni (1914–1992), Italian cyclist
