= Andrea Mandorlini (footballer, born 1991) =

Italian footballer

Personal information
- Date of birth: 14 February 1991 (age 35)
- Place of birth: Macerata, Italy
- Height: 1.75 m (5 ft 9 in)
- Position: Winger

Youth career
- Ascoli
- 2010–2011: Vicenza

Senior career*
| Years | Team | Apps | (Gls) |
| 2011–2012 | Vicenza | 0 | (0) |
| 2011–2012 | → Giacomense (loan) | 23 | (1) |
| 2012 | Civitanovese | 1 | (0) |
| 2012–2013 | SSD Calcio Corridonia | 13 | (2) |
| 2013–2014 | Tolentino | 31 | (8) |
| 2014–2015 | MCC Montegranaro | | |
| 2015 | Trodica Calcio 1968 | | |
| 2015–2016 | Folgore Veregra | 17 | (1) |
| 2016–2018 | ACD Helvia Recina 1975 | | |
| 2018 | Porto Sant'Elpidio MP | | |
| 2018–2019 | Sangiustese VP | | |
| 2019–2021 | Montemilone Pollenza | | |
| 2021 | Civitanovese | | |
| 2021–2024 | Elpidiense | | |
- * Club domestic league appearances and goals as of 7 February 2026

Andrea Mandorlini (born 14 February 1991) is an Italian footballer who plays as a winger.

== Career ==
=== Youth career ===
Mandorlini started his career at Ascoli Calcio 1898. He received his single national team call-up to 2005 Christmas Youth Tournament (Italian: Torneo Giovanile di Natale). Mandorlini joined Ascoli Allievi U17 team directly in 2006–07 season. Mandorlini spent 2008 to 2011 in the reserve league for Ascoli, which the last season was on loan from Vicenza.

=== Ascoli–Vicenza swap ===
On 29 June 2010, one day before the closure of 2009–10 financial year (on 30 June 2010), Ascoli and Vicenza made a swap deal, which saw Ivan Reali moved to Ascoli Piceno and Mandorlini moved to Vicenza. Both players were "valued" €800,000 and both clubs bought back 50% registration rights for half of the price (€400,000). Mandorlini signed a 4-year contract, costing Vicenza €200,000 a year as amortization (the way to book the transfer fee in capital accounts). The deal made both club had an immediately financial boost and speculative investment (Note: Both clubs also made swap deal with other clubs in June 2010 (Catania, Cesena, Chievo). On 30 June 2010, Ascoli had a positive net equity (net asset) of €527,438, but boosted by recent signing of Moretti (€4M), Tanaglia (€1M) and Reali (€0.8M). Except Moretti, Tanaglia and Reali did not made his Serie B debut yet nor included in Ascoli 2010–11 Serie B squad. On Vicenza side, was €5,171,680, which was boosted by Benedetti (€2M), Tonucci (€2.6M), Righini (€0.9M), Mandorlini (€0.8M) and Di Donato (residual value of (€0.8M)). Except Tonucci, none of the players actually played for Vicenza and Vicenza sold its youth internationals defender Davide Brivio for just €1.5 million in July 2010.) Mandorlini was immediately returned to Ascoli reserve in temporary deal.

In June 2011 Mandorlini was sold to Vicenza outright, in exchange with Reali for the same price (€400,000).

=== Lega Pro loans ===
In mid-2011 Mandorlini left for Giacomense, rejoining former Ascoli "team-mate" Tanaglia. Mandorlini played most of the game as sub. On 1 July 2012 Vicenza terminated the contract of Mandorlini.
