= Alberto Galuppo =

Italian footballer (born 1985)

Personal information
- Date of birth: 19 August 1985 (age 41)
- Place of birth: Reggio Emilia, Italy
- Height: 1.87 m (6 ft 2 in)
- Position: Centre back

Team information
- Current team: AC Marzolara

Youth career
- Parma

Senior career*
Years	Team	Apps	(Gls)
2005–2010	Parma	0	(0)
2005–2006	→ Pisa (loan)	20	(1)
2006–2007	→ Grosseto (loan)	0	(0)
2007	→ Pavia (loan)	13	(0)
2007–2008	→ Ancona (loan)	1	(0)
2008	→ Carpenedolo (loan)	15	(0)
2008–2009	→ Venezia (loan)	17	(1)
2009	→ Treviso (loan)	12	(0)
2009–2010	→ Cremonese (loan)	25	(0)
2010–2011	Cesena	0	(0)
2010–2011	→ Atletico Roma (loan)	3	(0)
2011–2012	Parma	0	(0)
2011–2012	→ Foligno (loan)	26	(4)
2012–2014	Siena	0	(0)
2012–2013	→ San Marino (loan)	18	(0)
2013–2014	→ Savona (loan)	6	(0)
2014–2015	Parma	0	(0)
2014–2015	Gubbio	17	(0)
2015–2018	Lentigione Calcio	73	(6)
2018–2023	ASD San Secondo 1917		
2023–2024	Colorno Calcio		
2024	SSD Futura Fornovo Medesano		
2024–	AC Marzolara		

International career
2005	Italy U20	1	(0)
- * Club domestic league appearances and goals as of 8 October 2026

Alberto Galuppo (born 19 August 1985) is an Italian footballer who plays as a centre back for AC Marzolara.

== Career ==
=== Parma ===
Born in Reggio Emilia, Galuppo started his professional career at Emilian club Parma F.C. Since 2005–06 season he was loaned to various Serie C1 club. He only played once for Ancona before his loan was terminated. In January 2008 Galuppo left for Serie C2 club Carpenedolo. Galuppo returned to the Italian third division for Venezia in 2008–09 Lega Pro Prima Divisione. In January 2009 he made his Serie B debut for league struggler Treviso. Galuppo spent 2009–10 Lega Pro Prima Divisione for Cremonese.

=== Cesena–Parma swap (2010) ===
In June 2010, few days before the closure of the 2009–10 financial year, he was exchanged with Milan Đurić in co-ownership deal. Both players' 50% registration rights were valued €1.1 million, thus both clubs got a paper profit as it intangible asset increased (the new value of the player contract, as youth product did not have any historic cost value to form that asset). However, Cesena never able to benefit from the player in the football field as Galuppo was loaned out with disappointing performance (3 games a season), instead, benefited financially. (Note: On that day, Cesena had a positive net asset of €2,867,115, which boosted by the player profit (by receiving intangible asset), namely Tulli (€2.6M), Galuppo (€2.2M) and Evangelisti (€0.9M), and successfully passed the financial test for 2011–12 Serie A without re-capitalization. On Parma side, the net asset was €12,788,668 and in good health even if deducting Đurić's €2.2 million price tag. To Cesena and Parma, the aggressive price of the new signing made the club had to "weather" (amortize) them (as intangible asset) heavily in the future, effectively borrowing future TV revenue to cover current deficit and VAT was as interests of the financial tricks.)

Galuppo left for Atletico Roma on 31 August 2010, re-joining other Parma teammate in a temporary deal in 2010–11 season.

=== Parma return (2011) ===
After Marco Rossi joined Cesena in June 2011 in a co-ownership deal for €2 million, Galuppo returned to Parma in July for €1 million. Galuppo was loaned out again for Foligno.

=== Siena–Parma swap (2012) ===
In June 2012, Parma made swap deals with other clubs again, which saw Manuel Coppola (€1.6 million), Galuppo (€1.7M), Abdou Doumbia (€0.5M) and Dellafiore (€1.8M) moved to Siena; Andrea Rossi (€1.8M), Alessandro Iacobucci (€1.7M), Gonçalo Brandão (€1.6M) and Giuseppe Pacini (€0.5M) to Parma. The move meant Parma did not have any cost generated from Galuppo in the 2011–12 financial year as the amortization of his transfer fee was totally outweighed by the profit. However it created another transfer fee to be amortized in 2012–13 accounts and beyond.

Both clubs did not announce the deal in their website and Galuppo, along with Doumbia and Parma teammate Diego Mella, left for San Marino Calcio in another temporary deal.

Galuppo made his debut as starting centre-back on 5 August 2012, a 2012–13 Coppa Italia match.

On 27 July 2013 he was loaned to Savona.

He suffered a knee injury in October 2013.

=== Parma return (2014) ===
Galuppo returned to Parma again on 18 June 2014, with Gonçalo Brandão moved back to Siena. Both 50% registration rights of the players were tagged for €1.1 million. In August 2014 he was signed by Gubbio in another temporary deal.

=== Serie D career ===
In summer 2015 Galuppo was signed by Serie D club Lentigione.
