= Gianmarco Piccioni =

Italian footballer (born 1991)

Personal information
- Date of birth: 18 July 1991 (age 35)
- Place of birth: San Benedetto del Tronto, Italy
- Height: 1.86 m (6 ft 1 in)
- Position: Forward

Team information
- Current team: Roma City

Youth career
- –2008: Sambenedettese
- 2009–2010: Vicenza

Senior career*
Years	Team	Apps	(Gls)
2008–2009	Sambenedettese	4	(0)
2009–2010	Vicenza	0	(0)
2010–2013	L'Aquila	11	(1)
2011–2012	→ Lanciano (loan)	7	(0)
2013	Shumen	10	(3)
2013–2014	Mosta	21	(12)
2014–2015	Balzan	27	(15)
2015–2017	Politehnica Iași	36	(6)
2017	UTA Arad	8	(1)
2017–2018	Santarcangelo	33	(10)
2018–2019	Teramo	18	(0)
2019	Rimini	18	(1)
2019–2020	Arzignano	20	(3)
2020–2021	Recanatese	8	(3)
2021	FC Messina	15	(3)
2021–2022	Acireale	22	(8)
2022–2023	Matera	28	(16)
2023	Nocerina	9	(1)
2023–2024	Fidelis Andria	8	(0)
2024–	Roma City	6	(2)
- * Club domestic league appearances and goals as of 10 November 2024

Gianmarco Piccioni (born 18 July 1991) is an Italian professional footballer who plays as a forward for Serie D club Roma City.

== Club career ==
=== Sambenedettese ===
Born in San Benedetto del Tronto, Marche, Piccioni started his career at hometown club Sambenedettese. Since 2007–08 season he played for its under-20 team. In 2008–09 Lega Pro Prima Divisione he also played 4 games for the first team.

=== Vicenza ===
In January 2009 he was sold to Serie B team Vicenza for €100,000 along with Mattia Evangelisti (€100,000), Filippo Forò (€150,000) and German Pomiro (€100,000). Sambenedettese also signed Stefano Pietribiasi (€150,000) and Marco Zentil (€150,000) in exchange. The two clubs also retained 50% registration rights of the 6 players. Piccioni signed a 2 1/2-year contract. In June 2009 the co-ownership deal was renewed except Evangelisti (to Vicenza) and Zentil (to Sambenedettese). However, Sambenedettese soon bankrupted. Piccioni played 18 games in under-20 league in 2009–10 season.

=== L'Aquila ===
In August 2010 he was sold to L'Aquila of Lega Pro Seconda Divisione (Italian fourth division). Piccioni only played a handful of games for the first team but was selected by Lega Pro under-20 representative team once, for a training camp. In January 2011 he was selected by Seconda Divisione Group C U-21 representative team for 2011 Lega Pro Quadrangular Tournament, eventually Group C was the winner.

On 31 August 2011 Piccioni returned to LP Prima Divisione (Italian third division) for Lanciano. On the same day L'Aquila signed Roberto Colussi in exchange.

=== Rimini ===
On 8 January 2019, he signed with Rimini.

=== Arzignano ===
On 7 September 2019, he joined Arzignano.
