= Michelangelo Minieri =

Italian footballer

Personal information
- Date of birth: 29 May 1981 (age 45)
- Place of birth: Rome, Italy
- Height: 1.83 m (6 ft 0 in)
- Position: Defender

Youth career
- Lazio

Senior career*
Years	Team	Apps	(Gls)
2001–2002	Lazio	0	(0)
2001–2002	→ Catania (loan)	21	(0)
2002–2004	Florentia Viola	22	(0)
2003–2004	→ Triestina (loan)	27	(0)
2004–2005	Triestina	43	(1)
2006	Avellino	8	(0)
2006–2007	Ascoli	24	(0)
2008–2011	Vicenza	36	(0)
2008	→ Perugia (loan)	5	(0)
2012	Barletta	3	(0)

International career
1997	Italy U15	2	(0)
- * Club domestic league appearances and goals

Michelangelo Minieri (born 29 May 1981) is an Italian former footballer who played as a defender.

== Career ==
Minieri started his career at Lazio youth team. He was loaned to Catania before being signed by reformed Florentia Viola (ex-Fiorentina) in Serie C2. He then played for Triestina at Serie B. In January 2006, he was signed by league rival Avellino but failed to avoid relegation. In July 2006, he was signed by Serie A team Ascoli which aim to protect its place in the top division. he played his first Serie A match on 24 September 2006 against U.C. Sampdoria. He played 19 times in his first Serie A season, including 13 starts. He followed Ascoli relegated to Serie B but only played 5 league appearances. In January 2008, he was transferred to Vicenza along with Giampietro Perrulli and in summer 2008 loaned to Perugia but in January 2009 back to Vicenza without any appearances after.
