= Alessandro Fabbro =

Italian footballer (born 1981)

Personal information
- Date of birth: 18 February 1981 (age 45)
- Place of birth: Cormons, Italy
- Height: 1.87 m (6 ft 2 in)
- Position: Centre back

Team information
- Current team: Pergolettese (assistant)

Senior career*
Years	Team	Apps	(Gls)
2003–2005	Martina Franca	7	(0)
2005–2006	Portosummaga	28	(1)
2006–2007	Gela	25	(2)
2007–2008	Vibonese	31	(1)
2008–2009	Barletta	30	(3)
2009–2012	Juve Stabia	52	(3)
2012	Pergocrema	12	(0)
2012–2015	Avellino	72	(4)
2015–2016	Lupa Roma	26	(2)
2016	Bra	10	(4)
2017	Chieri	7	(0)
2017–2018	Cavese	27	(1)
2018–2019	Pergolettese	19	(1)
2019–2020	Cjarlins Muzane	15	(3)

Managerial career
- 2022: Pergolettese (caretaker)
- * Club domestic league appearances and goals as of 07:45, 15 April 2020 (UTC)

Alessandro Fabbro (born 18 February 1981) is an Italian football coach and former player, currently in charge as assistant coach of Pergolettese.

== Playing career ==
Born in Cormons, Fabbro made his senior debuts with Martina Franca, in Serie C1. After playing for Serie C2 clubs, he enjoyed two successive promotions with Juve Stabia.

On 28 August 2018, he joined Serie D club Pergolettese.

On 30 August 2019, he moved to Cjarlins Muzane in Serie D.

== Coaching career ==
In October 2020, Fabbro was appointed youth coach of Avellino. In July 2022, he left Avellino to accept an offer to become the new assistant coach of Serie C club Pergolettese.

On 31 August 2022, following the resignations of Giovanni Mussa, Fabbro was named new caretaker head coach of Pergolettese. He served on his role until 27 September 2022, when Alberto Villa was appointed as the new permanent head coach.
