= Gaetano Ungaro =

Italian footballer

Personal information
- Date of birth: 21 September 1987 (age 39)
- Place of birth: Reggio Calabria, Italy
- Height: 1.85 m (6 ft 1 in)
- Position: Defender

Youth career
- Reggina

Senior career*
Years	Team	Apps	(Gls)
2004–2009	Reggina	1	(0)
2006–2007	→ Melfi (loan)	12	(0)
2007	→ Taranto (loan)	1	(0)
2008	→ Perugia (loan)	5	(0)
2008–2009	→ Ravenna (loan)	7	(0)
2009–2011	Cosenza	20	(0)
2012–2013	HinterReggio	35	(2)
2013–2014	Pavia	4	(0)
2014	Cuneo	0	(0)
2014–2015	Reggina	27	(2)
2015–2016	Grosseto	18	(1)
2016–2017	Potenza	15	(1)
2017	Racing Roma	14	(0)
2017–2018	Potenza	14	(0)
2018	Castrovillari	12	(1)
2018–2019	Reggiana	9	(0)
2019–2020	Messina	22	(0)
2020–2021	Arzhachena	26	(1)

International career
2004–2005	Italy U-18	5	(0)
2005–2006	Italy U-19	5	(1)
- * Club domestic league appearances and goals

Gaetano Ungaro (born 21 September 1987) is an Italian former professional football player.

== Club career ==
He played one game in the Serie A in the 2005–06 season for Reggina.

On 29 August 2018 he joined Serie D club Castrovillari.

On 6 August 2019 he signed with Messina.

== Post-playing career ==
On 15 July 2021 he returned to Reggina once again, now in Serie B, in a technical supporting role.

== Personal life ==
He is currently married to the daughter of Reggina owner Pasquale Foti, and in 2015 they gave birth to their first child.
