= Denis Tonucci =

Italian footballer (born 1988)

Personal information
- Date of birth: 6 September 1988 (age 38)
- Place of birth: Pesaro, Italy
- Height: 1.82 m (6 ft 0 in)
- Position: Central defender

Team information
- Current team: Vis Pesaro
- Number: 5

Youth career
- 2006–2007: Cesena

Senior career*
Years	Team	Apps	(Gls)
2007–2010	Cesena	24	(0)
2009–2010	→ Piacenza (loan)	28	(1)
2010–2012	Vicenza	37	(0)
2012–2013	Cesena	30	(3)
2013–2014	Ajaccio	20	(0)
2014–2015	Modena	5	(0)
2015	→ Brescia (loan)	7	(1)
2015–2018	Bari	61	(2)
2018–2019	Foggia	31	(3)
2019–2023	Juve Stabia	48	(3)
2020–2021	→ Catania (loan)	16	(1)
2023–	Vis Pesaro	69	(0)

International career
2005	Italy U18	3	(1)
2006–2007	Italy U19	8	(1)
2007–2008	Italy U20	4	(0)
2008–2009	Italy U20 Lega Pro	4	(0)
- * Club domestic league appearances and goals as of 30 April 2026

Denis Tonucci (born 6 September 1988) is an Italian professional footballer who plays as a defender for Serie C Group B club Vis Pesaro.

== Club career ==
=== Cesena ===
Born in Pesaro, the Marche region (bordering the Province of Rimini, Romagna), Tonucci started his professional career at Romagna side Cesena, which he had spent there since Giovanissimi B under-14 team. Tonucci made his Serie B debut on 3 March 2007, substituted Luigi Pagliuca in the 63rd minute. The team already losing to Bologna 1–3 and 2 players were already sent off at that time. The match eventually ended in 1–4. After Cesena relegated to the Lega Pro 1st Division in 2008, (Italian 3rd highest level) he played 12 times for the Group A champion, winning promotion back to Serie B. Tonucci also remained at Primavera under-20 youth team as overage player which the team changed to play at Berretti League and the 2007–08 Primavera team merged with Cesena's 2007–08 Berretti team.

On 10 August 2009, he was loaned to fellow Serie B team Piacenza with option to buy him outright.

=== Vicenza ===
On 30 June 2010, Tonucci along with Luca Righini were signed by Serie B side Vicenza in co-ownership deal for €1.3 million and €450,000 transfer fee respectively, on 4-year contracts, while Serie A newcomer Cesena signed Giacomo Tulli and Mattia Evangelisti in another co-ownership deal for the same fee. However, only Tonucci and Tulli remains in the top two levels of Italy, which both players remained in Vicenza for 2010–11 and 2011–12 season. Righini and Evangelisti left for Lega Pro teams. Cesena did not use either one of the players, however Cesena benefited financially in 2009–10 financial year and heavy cost in future seasons. (Note: Cesena had a positive net equity of €2,867,115 on 30 June 2010, due to player profit, despite composite with intangible asset (player contract value) of Tulli (€2.6M), Galuppo (€2.2M) and Evangelisti (€0.9M), none of them actually in the first team of Cesena in 2010–11 season but signed by swap deal few days before the closure of 2009–10 financial year. Moreover, Davide Brivio, former youth internationals was sold to Serie A team U.S. Lecce from Vicenza for just €1.5 million. Eventually, Cesena had spent €1.3 million in total for Tulli from 2010–11 to 2011–12 financial year and Evangelisti for €450,000 in the same time frame, both never played for Cesena as amortization of their contract value.) Tonucci only played 10 times in 2010–11 Serie B. In 2011–12 Serie B, Tonucci played 27 times. Both Cesena and Vicenza relegated at the end of season.

=== Cesena return ===
Both Cesena and Vicenza relegated at the end of season, in June 2012 Cesena bought back 50% registration rights of Tonucci for €650,000 and Righini for €225,000; Vicenza also bought back 50% registration rights of Tulli for €650,000 and Evangelisti for €225,000, made the deals a pure player swap again. Except Tulli who signed a 2-year contract, all 3 other players were signed a 1-year deal. Tonucci later extended his contract to 30 June 2015 (from 2013), but transferred to the French club for free in summer 2013, made Cesena had a write-down of intangible asset of €866,667 in 2013–14 financial year, instead of attributed to 2012–13.

=== Ajaccio ===
On 2 July 2013 he signed a 2-year contract with French side Ajaccio, which Juventus football legend Fabrizio Ravanelli was the coach of the first team.

=== Modena ===
On 7 October 2014 Tonucci was signed by Modena on a 1+2-year contract. On 2 February 2015 Tonucci was signed by Brescia Calcio in a temporary deal.

=== Bari ===
On 7 July 2015 he was signed by Bari on a 3-year deal.

=== Foggia ===
On 9 January 2018 Tonucci joined fellow Serie B club Foggia.

=== Juve Stabia ===
On 11 August 2019, he signed with Juve Stabia. On 28 September 2020, he was loaned to Catania with an option to buy.

=== Vis Pesaro ===
On 12 January 2023, Tonucci signed with Vis Pesaro until the end of the 2022–23 season, with an option to extend for the 2023–24 season.

== International career ==
Tonucci was call-up to the 23-man preliminary Italy U17 squad for the 2005 UEFA European Under-17 Football Championship, which Italy automatic qualified as host, but he was excluded from the final 18-man squad.

In 2005–06 season, Tonucci played for Italy U18 team, the feeder team of U19. He scored a header against Turkey as team captain, which eventually won 2–0.

Tonucci capped for Italy at 2007 UEFA European Under-19 Football Championship elite qualification which Italy failed to qualify to the next round. In the 2007–08 season, he capped for Italy U20 at 2007–08 Four Nations Tournament which he played 4 out of 6 matches.

In 2008–09 season, he capped for Italy U20 Lega Pro team, for 2008–09 Mirop Cup, played 4 out of possible 6 (or 8). He played the matches that lost to Hungary 1–2, winning Croatia U20 in 2–1 as captain, 1–1 draw with Slovakia U20 and 0–4 in the away match. He did not play the rest of the fixture as both legs against Slovenia U20 team were scheduled in the 2009–10 Italian season.

He played once for Italy U21 Serie B team in 2009–10 season, in an internal friendly. The team split into two against itself, which the white team winning Blue team 2–0. He was the vice-captain of the white team.

== Honours ==
Cesena

- Lega Pro Prima Divisione: 2008–09
