= Nicolas Bovi =

Italian footballer

Personal information
- Full name: Nicolas Bovi
- Date of birth: 11 March 1993 (age 33)
- Place of birth: Reggio Emilia, Italy
- Height: 1.82 m (6 ft 0 in)
- Position: Midfielder

Team information
- Current team: ASC Arcetana

Youth career
- Modena
- 2009–2010: Reggiana

Senior career*
Years	Team	Apps	(Gls)
2010–2015	Reggiana	30	(0)
2012	→ Cagliari (loan)	0	(0)
2014–2015	→ Pro Patria (loan)	25	(2)
2015–2017	Correggese	48	(13)
2017–2018	Lentigione Calcio	14	(1)
2018–2019	Piccardo Traversetolo		
2019	AC Rolo		
2019–	ASC Arcetana		
- * Club domestic league appearances and goals as of 16 March 2012

Nicolas Bovi (born 11 March 1993) is an Italian footballer who plays for ASC Arcetana.

== Career ==
Born in Reggio Emilia, Bovi started his career at Modena's youth ranks. In 2009–2010 he was moved to Reggiana, and made his professional debut on 8 August 2010, in a Coppa Italia match against AlzanoCene.

On 20 January 2012, Bovi moved to Serie A club Cagliari Calcio.

On 4 August 2014 Bovi was signed by Pro Patria in a temporary deal, re-joining teammate Erik Panizzi. On 31 August 2015 he was released by Reggiana.

In November 2019, Bovi joined ASC Arcetana.
