= Filippo Petterini =

Italian footballer

Personal information
- Date of birth: 14 November 1980 (age 45)
- Place of birth: Foligno, Italy
- Height: 1.79 m (5 ft 10 in)
- Position: Defender

Senior career*
Years	Team	Apps	(Gls)
1996–1997	Perugia	0	(0)
1997–2002	Foligno	69	(6)
2003–2004	Sambenedettese	23	(0)
2004–2005	Lucchese	25	(1)
2005–2009	Foligno	125	(8)
2009–2012	Pescara	62	(0)
2012–2013	Barletta	14	(0)
2013–2014	Castel Rigone	5	(0)
2014–2015	Foligno	27	(0)
2015	Subasio		
2015–2017	Cannara		
2017–2020	Foligno		
- * Club domestic league appearances and goals

Filippo Petterini (born 14 November 1980) is an Italian former footballer who played as a defender.
