= Luca Rigoni =

Italian footballer (born 1984)

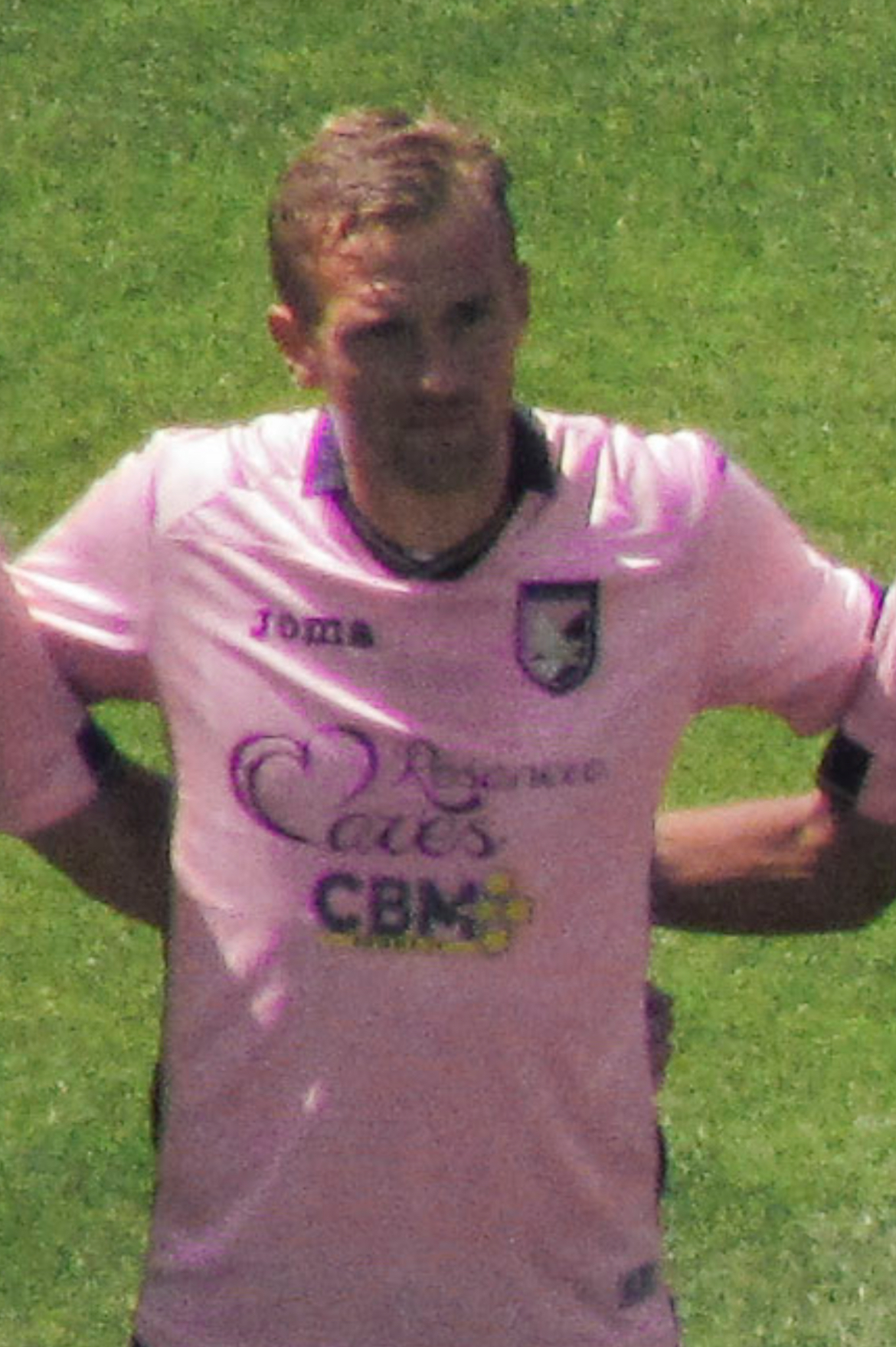

Personal information
- Date of birth: 7 December 1984 (age 41)
- Place of birth: Schio, Italy
- Height: 1.85 m (6 ft 1 in)
- Position: Midfielder

Youth career
- Vicenza

Senior career*
Years	Team	Apps	(Gls)
2003–2008	Vicenza	113	(7)
2005–2006	→ Reggina (loan)	4	(0)
2006	→ Piacenza (loan)	9	(0)
2008–2014	Chievo	172	(10)
2014–2015	Palermo	41	(10)
2016–2018	Genoa	72	(8)
2018–2019	Parma	23	(2)
2019–2022	Vicenza	50	(2)

International career
2004	Italy U20	1	(0)
- * Club domestic league appearances and goals

Luca Rigoni (born 7 December 1984) is an Italian former footballer. He is the elder brother of Nicola Rigoni. He played as a right or central midfielder.

== Career ==
=== Vicenza ===
Born in Schio, Province of Vicenza, Veneto, Rigoni started his career at hometown club Vicenza. He played his first league match on 24 May 2003 against Cagliari Calcio, on the 35th matchday, towards the end of the Serie B season. In the 2003–04 season he became one of the members of the first team, playing 31 league matches.

=== Reggina ===
After the club almost relegated to Serie C1 in 2005, Rigoni along with Davide Biondini were sold to Serie A struggler Reggina (in a co-ownership deal for €900,000 and €500,000 respectively; Ricardo Esteves moved to Vicenza for €500,000). However Rigoni failed to enter the first team. He was loaned back to Serie B for Piacenza in mid-season. Circa January Reggina also acquired Biondini outright for another €700,000, with Simone Cavalli moved to Vicenza for €775,000.

=== Vicenza return ===
In June 2006 Vicenza bought back Rigoni for €1 million (with and Esteves moved back to Reggina for the same fee) He was offered a new four-year contract which last until 30 June 2010. Since returned to Vicenza, he became the regular starter, but in January 2008, he moved to Chievo in another co-ownership deal, for €1 million (€850,000 plus 50% registration rights of Mattia Marchesetti).

=== Chievo ===
With Chievo, Rigoni made only 3 starts in 11 appearances in the first season, He followed the team promoted to Serie A, and played regularly since January 2009, replacing Vincenzo Italiano as starting central midfielder.

In June 2009 Chievo bought the remain 50% registration rights from Vicenza, for another €1 million, but in terms of Giacomo Di Donato's registration rights. Rigoni was the absolute starter of the Veronese in 2009–10 season. But due to muscle problem, he missed nearly 2 months and was replaced by Manuel Iori.

In January 2010, he fractured his nose during training, but he already disqualified for the next match after receiving a yellow card on 24 January 2010. He was suspended again on round 26 and rested on round 27. On round 33, he was suspended again. He was rested again against Roma in the last round.

At the start of 2010–11 season, with gialloblu having offered contract extensions to several players, including Luciano and Squizzi, Rigoni signed a new five-year contract on 11 August.

=== Palermo ===
On 25 July 2014, Palermo announced to have completed the permanent signing of Rigoni on a three-year deal.

=== Genoa ===
On 28 December 2015, Rigoni was signed by Genoa C.F.C., effective on the opening of January 2016 transfer window.

=== Parma ===
On 18 July 2018, Rigoni signed to Serie A side Parma a one-year contract with an option for a second one.

=== Once again back to Vicenza ===
On 2 September 2019, Rigoni return to Serie C club Vicenza after 11 years. On 8 February 2022, Rigoni announced his retirement from playing.

== Career statistics ==
=== Club ===
As of 11 June 2019

Club	League	Season	League		Cup		Europe		Other		Total	
Club	League	Season	Apps	Goals	Apps	Goals	Apps	Goals	Apps	Goals	Apps	Goals
Vicenza	Serie B	2002–03	2	0	0	0	–		–		2	0
Vicenza	Serie B	2003–04	31	2	0	0	–		–		31	2
Vicenza	Serie B	2004–05	29	2	2	0	–		2	0	33	2
Reggina (loan)	Serie A	2005–06	4	0	0	0	–		–		4	0
Piacenza (loan)	Serie B	2005–06	9	0	0	0	–		–		9	0
Vicenza	Serie B	2006–07	36	1	0	0	–		–		36	1
Vicenza	Serie B	2007–08	15	2	2	0	–		–		17	2
Vicenza	Total		113	7	4	0	–		2	0	119	7
Chievo Verona	Serie B	2007–08	11	0	0	0	–		–		11	0
Chievo Verona	Serie A	2008–09	21	1	0	0	–		–		21	1
Chievo Verona	Serie A	2009–10	24	1	2	0	–		–		26	1
Chievo Verona	Serie A	2010–11	29	1	0	0	–		–		29	1
Chievo Verona	Serie A	2011–12	25	2	2	0	–		–		27	2
Chievo Verona	Serie A	2012–13	31	1	1	0	–		–		32	1
Chievo Verona	Serie A	2013–14	33	4	1	0	–		–		34	4
Chievo Verona	Total		174	10	6	0	–		–		180	10
Palermo	Serie A	2014–15	31	9	1	0	–		–		32	9
Palermo	Serie A	2015–16	10	1	2	1	–		–		12	2
Palermo	Total		41	10	3	1	–		–		44	11
Genoa	Serie A	2015–16	18	3	0	0	–		–		18	3
Genoa	Serie A	2016–17	31	3	1	0	–		–		32	3
Genoa	Serie A	2017–18	23	2	1	0	–		–		24	2
Genoa	Total		72	8	2	0	–		–		74	8
Parma	Serie A	2018–19	23	2	1	0	–		–		24	2
Career total			436	37	16	1	–		2	0	454	38

== Honours ==
Chievo

- Serie B: 2007–08
