= Stefano Pietribiasi =

Italian footballer

Personal information
- Date of birth: 8 May 1985 (age 41)
- Place of birth: Schio, Italy
- Height: 1.80 m (5 ft 11 in)
- Position: Forward

Team information
- Current team: Campodarsego

Youth career
- Vicenza

Senior career*
Years	Team	Apps	(Gls)
2004–2009	Vicenza	10	(0)
2005–2006	→ Cuneo (loan)	31	(12)
2007	→ Ivrea (loan)	12	(1)
2007–2008	→ Pavia (loan)	16	(2)
2008	→ Pro Vercelli (loan)	9	(1)
2009	Sambenedettese	9	(1)
2009–2011	Sambonifacese	53	(26)
2011–2012	Carpi	6	(0)
2012	→ Mantova (loan)	17	(7)
2012–2013	Mantova	30	(7)
2013–2016	Bassano	91	(32)
2016–2017	Pordenone	21	(0)
2017–	Campodarsego	13	(4)
- * Club domestic league appearances and goals

Stefano Pietribiasi (born 8 May 1985), with the nickname "Condoraccio", is an Italian footballer who plays as a striker for A.C Trento Calcio.

== Career ==
Pietribiasi left for Pavia on 6 August 2007.

In January 2009, he was signed by Lega Pro 1st Div. side Sambenedettese in a co-ownership bid, along with Marco Zentil. Vicenza also got four players namely Mattia Evangelisti, Filippo Forò, Gianmarco Piccioni and German Pomiro. After the bankruptcy of Sambenedettese, Vicenza bought back Pietribiasi and Zentil. In August 2009 he was resold to Sambonifacese.

On 13 July 2011 Pietribiasi joined Carpi in 2-year contract. On 16 January 2012, Pietribiasi was loaned to Mantova F.C.

On 17 August 2012 he joined Mantova outright. on 6 August 2013 he was signed by Bassano. His contract was renewed on 23 May 2014. After losing playoff finals against Como, he signed a contract extension with Bassano until 2016.

In the summer of 2016 he moved to Pordenone.

In the summer of 2019 he moved to A.C Trento Calcio.
