= Mattia Evangelisti =

Italian footballer (born 1991)

Personal information
- Date of birth: 3 May 1991 (age 35)
- Place of birth: Alatri, Italy
- Position: Midfielder

Team information
- Current team: Altamura (assistant manager)

Youth career
- Giulianova
- 2007–2008: Torino

Senior career*
Years	Team	Apps	(Gls)
2008–2009	Torino	0	(0)
2008–2009	→ Sambenedettese (loan)	1	(0)
2009	Sambenedettese	0	(0)
2009–2010	Vicenza	0	(0)
2010–2012	Cesena	0	(0)
2010–2012	→ Andria (loan)	26	(0)
2012	→ Foligno (loan)	5	(0)
2012–2013	Vicenza	0	(0)
2012–2013	→ Fano (loan)	18	(0)
2013–2014	Bellaria	4	(0)
2016–2017	Real Giulianova		
Total		54	(0)

Managerial career
- 2020–2021: ASD Cologna Calcio 2012
- 2021–2022: Real Giulianova U19
- 2022–2023: Real C. Guardia Vomano
- 2024–2025: Notaresco
- * Club domestic league appearances and goals

Mattia Evangelisti (born 3 May 1991) is an Italian manager and former footballer who is currently as a assistant manager for Italian Serie C club Altamura.

== Career ==
=== Early career ===
Nato a Roma, Regione lazio, Evangelisti joined Piedmontese club Torino in August 2007, from Abruzzo team Giulianova. After a season with Turin's Allievi Nazionali under-17 team Evangelisti left for Sambenedettese on loan.

=== Vicenza ===
In January 2009 the San Benedetto team purchased Evangelisti from Turin and re-sold 50% registration rights to Vicenza for €100,000. On the same day the San Benedetto side also sold Gianmarco Piccioni (€100,000), German Pomiro (€100,000) and Filippo Forò (€150,000) to Vicenza, while Stefano Pietribiasi (€150,000) and Marco Zentil (€150,000) moved to opposite direction. In June 2009 Sambenedettese sold the remain 50% registration rights of Evangelisti to the Veneto team for free and renewed the three other co-ownerships, except Zentil was given to San Benedetto from Vicenza for free. However, Sambenedettese soon bankrupted. Evangelisti only played 11 games for Vicenza's under-20 reserve team in 2009–10 Campionato Nazionale Primavera season.

=== Cesena (2010–12) ===
On 30 June 2010, the last day of financial year of Serie A newcomer A.C. Cesena and Vicenza Calcio (at that time in Serie B) formed an exchange deal, which Cesena's Denis Tonucci was exchanged for Giacomo Tulli (both 50% registration rights tagged for €1.3 million); Evangelisti also moved to Cesena in exchange for another youngster Luca Righini (Both 50% registration rights tagged for €450,000). The mother clubs of 4 players also retained 50% registration rights of the players. Both youngster were farmed out to Lega Pro teams while Tulli was loaned back to Vicenza for two seasons, made none of the players actually joined Cesena first team. However, the deals created paper profit for both clubs to 2009–10 financial year and co-currently heavy cost in future seasons. (Note: After the deal and similar swap deal with other clubs, Vicenza Calcio had a positive net equity on 30 June 2010 of €5,171,680, however the club main asset, the intangible one, was composite with Benedetti (€2M), Tonucci (€2.6M), Righini (€0.9M), Mandorlini (€0.8M), all signed by player exchange and days before the closure of the financial year, as well as the residual value of the risky signing of the previous year: Giacomo Di Donato for €800,000. Except Tonucci, none of the players actually played for Vicenza and Vicenza sold its youth internationals defender Davide Brivio for just €1.5 million.)

Evangelisti was loaned to Italian third level club Andria in July 2010. He only played 14 times in his first season as a true professional player. In June 2011 the co-ownership was renewed. In July Evangelisti was loaned back to Andria.

On 30 January 2012 Evangelisti left for Foligno. Foligno relegated at the end of season.

=== Vicenza return ===
After both Cesena and Vicenza relegated (to Serie B and Lega Pro Prima Divisione respectively), Evangelisti and Tulli returned to Vicenza for €225,000 and €650,000 fee respectively in June 2012; at the same time Righini and Tonucci also returned to Cesena also for €225,000 and €650,000 respectively. Evangelisti signed a 1-year contract.

In July 2012 he was signed by Fano. Vicenza later re-admitted to Serie B.

=== Post-Vicenza ===
In August 2013 he was signed by Bellaria along with former Cesena team-mate Nicola Del Pivo.

In August 2016 Evangelisti returned to Giulianova, for amateur club Real Giulianova, a spiritual successor of Giulianova Calcio.
