= Davide Biondini =

Italian footballer (born 1983)

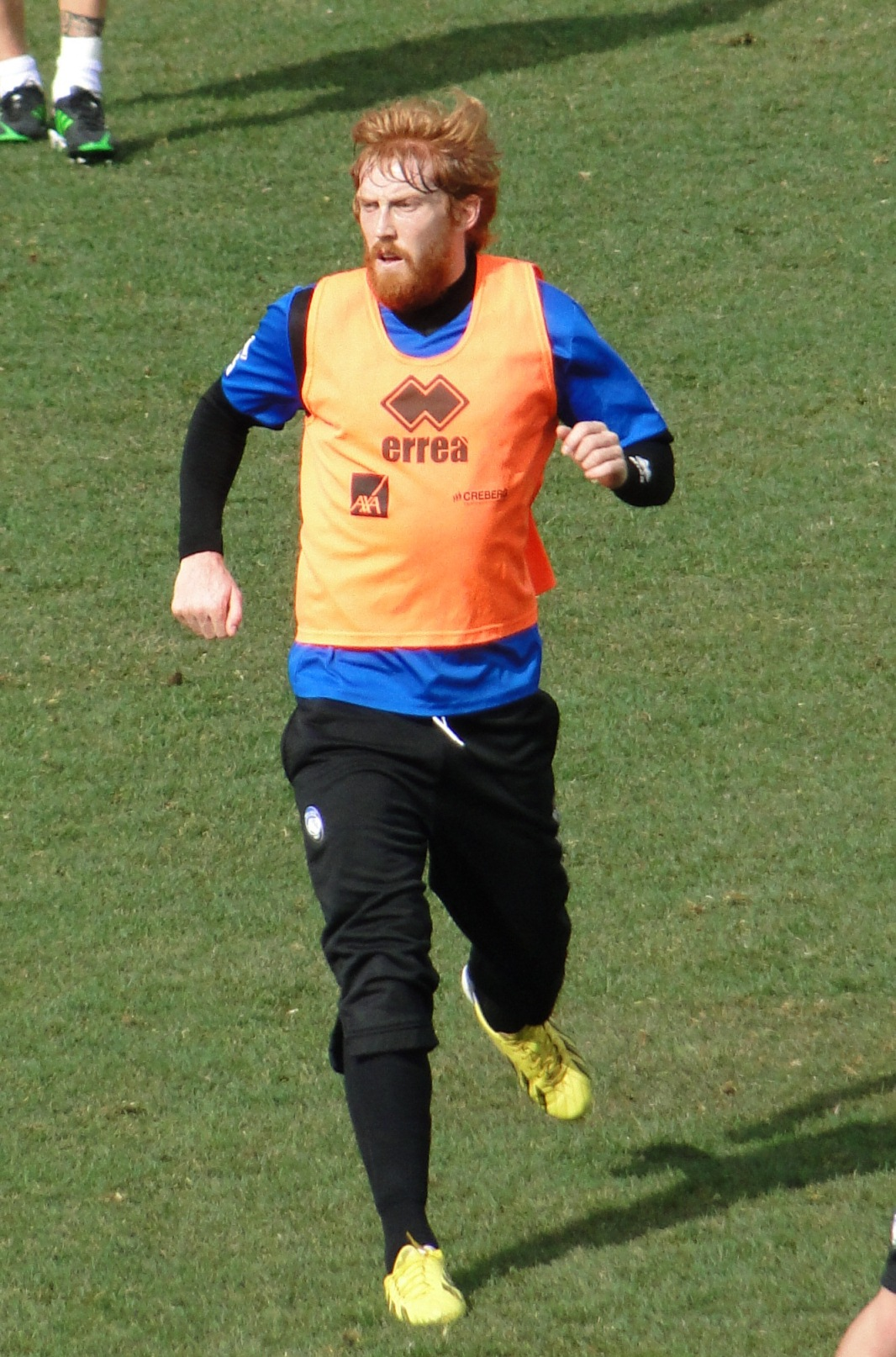
- Biondini in 2013

Personal information
- Date of birth: 24 January 1983 (age 43)
- Place of birth: Montiano, Italy
- Height: 1.78 m (5 ft 10 in)
- Position: Midfielder

Youth career
- 2000–2001: Cesena

Senior career*
Years	Team	Apps	(Gls)
2001–2003	Cesena	45	(2)
2003–2005	Vicenza	62	(2)
2005–2006	Reggina	28	(0)
2006–2012	Cagliari	161	(6)
2012–2014	Genoa	36	(1)
2012–2013	→ Atalanta (loan)	24	(0)
2014–2018	Sassuolo	86	(1)
2018–2019	Cesena	22	(1)
Total		464	(13)

International career
2004–2006	Italy U21	2	(0)
2009	Italy	2	(0)
- * Club domestic league appearances and goals

Davide Biondini (Italian pronunciation: [ˈdaːvide bjonˈdiːni]; born 24 January 1983) is an Italian former professional footballer who played as a midfielder.

== Club career ==
=== Cesena ===
Biondini started his career at Cesena, near his birthplace. After playing more than 40 Serie C1 games, he left the club.

=== Vicenza ===
Biondini was transferred to Serie B team Vicenza Calcio in temporary deal in 2003. in 2004 the Veneto club acquired Biondini in co-ownership deal for €250,000. In June 2005 Vicenza acquired Biondini outright after winning the bid mediated by Lega Calcio for €202,500. (Note: As co-ownership income of €47,500 for the discount.)

=== Reggina ===
In August 2005 Biondini was signed by Serie A club Reggina Calcio in another co-ownership deal for €500,000, which the Calabria team also signed Luca Rigoni from Veneto, with Ricardo Esteves moved to opposite direction. Biondini made his Serie A debut in 2005–06 Serie A. Circa January 2006 Reggina signed Biondini outright for another €700,000 (Note: As co-ownership income of €200,000 plus pre-agreed €500,000.), with Simone Cavalli moved to opposite direction outright for €775,000.

=== Cagliari ===
On 31 August 2006, he left for Cagliari on loan for an undisclosed fee with an option to sign outright. In 2007 Cagliari excised the option.

=== Genoa ===
On 11 January 2012, he left for Genoa on free transfer in 4 1/2-year contract. (Note: Cagliari did not disclosed the transfer detail in its financial report, however Biondini's residual contract value circa January 2012 was €38,321, and in the whole 2011–12 financial season Cagliari had a player trading loss (Italian: minusvalenze cessione calciatori) of €38,607.) (However the transfer also cost Genoa €500,000 as other fee.)

After a single season, signed a loan deal with the newly promoted Serie A club Atalanta on 24 August 2012 for €200,000.

=== Sassuolo ===
On 23 January 2014, Biondini left for Sassuolo in a temporary deal for €200,000, with an option to purchase, re-joining Genoa teammate Antonio Floro Flores (loan) and Thomas Manfredini (definitive). In June 2014 Sassuolo excised the options to purchase Biondini and Floro Flores from Genoa, for €1.3 million and €2.5 million respectively.

=== Back to Cesena ===
In July 2018, he returned to the city where he started his professional career, joining Cesena. Following Cesena's promotion back to Serie C at the end of the 2018–19 season, he retired from playing.

== International career ==
With the Italy U-21 squad he took part at the 2006 Euro U-21 Championship. He wore the prestigious number 10 shirt, but just made one appearance as a substitute in the last match of the group stage.

Biondini made his senior national team debut on 14 November 2009 during a friendly match against the Netherlands.
