= Massimiliano Marsili =

Italian footballer

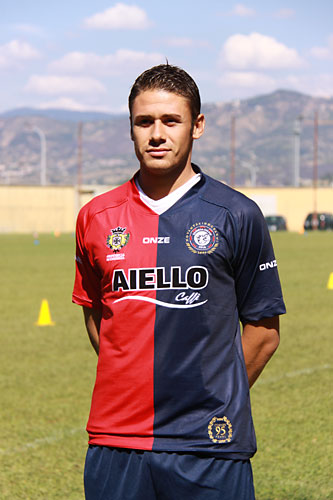

Personal information
- Date of birth: 14 July 1987 (age 39)
- Place of birth: Rome, Italy
- Height: 1.79 m (5 ft 10 in)
- Position: Midfielder

Team information
- Current team: Barletta
- Number: 4

Senior career*
Years	Team	Apps	(Gls)
2004–2009	Roma	1	(0)
2007–2008	→ Taranto (loan)	21	(0)
2008–2009	→ Modena (loan)	10	(0)
2009–2010	Cosenza	7	(0)
2010–2012	Nocerina	35	(2)
2012	Andria	12	(0)
2012–2013	Martina	26	(0)
2013	Brindisi	14	(1)
2013–2014	Matera	14	(1)
2014–2015	Taranto	31	(3)
2015–2016	Racing Fondi	0	(0)
2015–2016	→ Taranto (loan)	32	(4)
2016	Carrarese	16	(1)
2016–2017	Matelica	9	(0)
2017	Nocerina	14	(2)
2017–2019	Taranto	46	(5)
2019–2020	Bitonto	23	(0)
2020–2022	Taranto	58	(2)
2022–2023	Casarano	28	(2)
2023–	Barletta	3	(0)

International career
2005	Italy U-18	4	(0)
2005–2006	Italy U-19	7	(0)
2006–2007	Italy U-20	2	(0)
- * Club domestic league appearances and goals as of 8 October 2023

Massimiliano Marsili (born 14 July 1987) is an Italian professional footballer who coach for ASD Ginosa.

== Biography ==
Marsili made one appearance for Roma in Serie A at the age of 17, playing 36 minutes against Udinese on April 10, 2005. He was signed by Cosenza Calcio 1914 on 25 August 2009 in co-ownership deal. In June 2010 Roma gave up the remain 50% registration rights to Cosenza for free.

In 2010, he was signed by A.S.G. Nocerina. In January 2012 he left for Andria.

In 2012, he was signed by Martina of Serie C2.

In 2013, he was signed by Serie D club Brindisi. In December 2013 he was signed by fellow Serie D club Matera. In 2017, he was signed by A.S.D. Nocerina 1910 of Serie D.

After a season in Serie D with Taranto he joined Carrarese on a free transfer.

On 20 July 2022, Marsili moved to Casarano.

== Honours ==
- Coppa Italia winner: 2006–07.
