= Simone Cavalli =

Italian footballer

Personal information
- Full name: Simone Cavalli
- Date of birth: 10 January 1979 (age 47)
- Place of birth: Parma, Italy
- Height: 1.81 m (5 ft 11 in)
- Position: Forward

Youth career
- –1999: Modena

Senior career*
Years	Team	Apps	(Gls)
1997–2000	Modena	7	(0)
1999–2000	→ Montevarchi (loan)	34	(3)
2000–2003	Chievo	0	(0)
2001–2002	→ Carrarese (loan)	30	(8)
2002–2004	→ Lecco (loan)	34	(15)
2002–2003	→ Messina (loan)	1	(0)
2003	→ Teramo (loan)	14	(1)
2003–2005	Cesena	74	(30)
2005–2006	Reggina	13	(2)
2006–2007	Vicenza	50	(9)
2007–2010	Bari	37	(9)
2009	→ Frosinone (loan)	14	(3)
2009–2010	→ Mantova (loan)	21	(0)
2010	Andria	9	(1)
2011	Gloria Bistriţa	9	(3)
2011	FCM Târgu Mureş	5	(1)
2012	Voghera	11	(0)
2012	Colorno		
2013	Savignanese		
2013–2016	Castelvetro		
Total		303	(85)
- * Club domestic league appearances and goals as of 2 July 2012

Simone Cavalli (born 10 January 1979) is a former Italian footballer who played as a forward.

Cavalli made his Serie A debut on 28 August 2005 against Roma and his Liga I debut against Astra Ploiesti on 28 February 2011.

== Biography ==
=== Chievo ===
Cavalli left for A.C. ChievoVerona in co-ownership deal circa 2000. In June 2001, Chievo acquired Cavalli outright as well as bought back defender Nicola Legrottaglie.

=== Cesena ===
Cavalli was signed by Cesena in June 2004 for €150,000 in co-ownership deal. In June 2005, Cesena acquired Cavalli outright for an undisclosed fee.

=== Reggina ===
In August 2005, Cavalli was signed by Reggina Calcio for an undisclosed fee. Cesena also signed defender Giovanni Morabito from Reggina as part of the deal. Cavalli made his Serie A debut for Reggina.

=== Vicenza ===
In January 2006 he was signed by Vicenza Calcio for €775,000. In August 2005, Reggina also acquired Davide Biondini for €500,000 in co-ownership deal. Circa January 2006 Reggina acquired Biondini outright for another €700,000. (Note: As co-ownership income of €200,000 plus pre-agreed €500,000.) Reggina also signed Luca Rigoni for €900,000 in August and sold back to Vicenza in June for €1 million, as well as Vicenza signed Ricardo Esteves from Reggina for €500,000 in August and sold back to Calabria in June for the same fee.

=== Bari ===
Cavalli was signed by A.S. Bari on 31 August 2007 in another co-ownership deal for €500,000. In June 2008 Bari acquired Cavalli outright for another €280,000. (Note: As co-ownership cost of €220,000 for the discount.) On 2 January 2009 he was signed by Frosinone. On 14 August 2009 he was signed by A.C. Mantova.

=== Late career ===
In mid-2010 he left for the third division club A.S. Andria BAT. In December 2010 he was released. Cavalli spent a year in Romania before he was signed by Italian Serie D club Voghera circa November 2011.

In July 2012 Cavalli was signed by Eccellenza Emilia-Romagna club Colorno. In December 2012 he joined another Eccellenza club Savignanese. In 2013, he joined Promozione club Castelvetro.
