= Rodrigo da Silva (footballer) =

Brazilian footballer

Rodrigo
Personal information
- Full name: Rodrigo Jose dos santos
- Date of birth: 21 January 1981 (age 45)
- Place of birth: São Paulo, Brazil
- Height: 1.84 m (6 ft 1/2 in)
- Position: Forward

Team information
- Current team: Chievo

Youth career
- 2003–2008: Chievo

Senior career*
Years	Team	Apps	(Gls)
2006–	Chievo	0	(0)
2008–2009	→ Mezzocorona (loan)	15	(0)
2009	→ Itala San Marco (loan)	5	(0)
- * Club domestic league appearances and goals

Rodrigo Thiago Aparecido da Silva (born 21 January 1988) is a Brazilian footballer. He is currently under contract for Italian Serie A side Chievo.

== Biography ==
Born in Brazil, Rodrigo Thiago started his professional career at Italy after scouted by Chievo. He made his first team debut for Chievo on 8 November 2006, a Coppa Italia Round of 16 first leg against Reggina, a 2–2 draw. He substituted Salvatore Bruno after Paolo Sammarco scored the equalizing goal. He played the next two games on 10 January and 17 January 2007, the quarter-final matches of the cup against Sampdoria.

In 2008–09 season he was loaned to Mezzocorona and in January 2009 to Itala San Marco.

In 2009–10 season, along with Stefano Olivieri they failed to loan out and were not assigned a shirt number.
