= Giacomo Di Donato =

Italian footballer

Personal information
- Date of birth: 8 February 1988 (age 38)
- Place of birth: Alcamo, Italy
- Height: 1.77 m (5 ft 10 in)
- Position: Defender

Senior career*
Years	Team	Apps	(Gls)
2005	Campobello di Mazara	9	(0)
2005–2007	Cosenza	44	(1)
2007–2008	Bitonto	26	(0)
2008–2009	Chievo	0	(0)
2008–2009	→ Lamezia (loan)	23	(0)
2009–2011	Vicenza	0	(0)
2009–2010	→ Valenzana (loan)	3	(0)
Total		105	(1)
- * Club domestic league appearances and goals

Giacomo Di Donato (born 8 February 1988) is a former Italian footballer.

== Biography ==
He was born in Alcamo, in the Province of Trapani, Sicily, and started his career at Campobello di Mazara in 2005–06 Serie D: in October 2005 he was signed by another southern Italy side Cosenza, also from Group I.

Di Donato was spotted by another Calabria team Vigor Lamezia at the end of season and in July 2008 Serie A club Chievo signed him from Lamezia; he also remained in Lamezia Terme for 2008–09 Lega Pro Seconda Divisione. In June 2009, Chievo signed Luca Rigoni outright from Vicenza Calcio, however Chievo did not wish to pay anything to Vicenza. Vicenza, instead, signed Di Donato for an exponential €1 million and Rigoni joined Chievo for €1 million, which the same fee he left 1 1/2 year ago.

The deal was more a pure financial trick than a logical sports decision. (in fact in Italian accounting, Vicenza Calcio already booked the transfer revenue of €2 million instead of €1 million in 2007–08 financial year (closing on 30 June each year), as another half as special co-ownership asset. if the remaining 50 per cent sold below the accounting price, the club would have had financial cost in that financial season).

Thus, Rigoni was sold under the previous accounting price of €1M; and in accounting the transfer fee for the new signing (Di Donato) was amortized proportionally to player contract (5-year), which the supposed €1 million loss in 2008–09 now extended to €200,000 a season from 2009 to 2014 and zero in 2008–09, but deducting wage (which Vicenza saved a season by lending) and VAT. Moreover, Chievo also booked an exponential player profit on Di Donato in 2008–09 accounts.

On 1 August 2009 Di Donato was farmed to Valenzana along with Alessandro Lorello, however, he ran out of potential and only played 3 times. Di Donato had to play for the reserve in the second half of the season.

On 1 July 2010 he returned to Vicenza and became a ghost player. Vicenza would have suffered a great loss if they immediately write-down his flopped value on 1 July 2010 (€800,000). Instead, Di Donato remained on the balance sheet (and balance sheet only) for another year. During the 2011–12 season Vicenza finally write-down the contract value back dated to 1 July 2011 for €600,000.

== Sources ==
- Giacomo Di Donato at TuttoCalciatori.net (in Italian)
- Vicenza Calcio SpA Report and Accounts on 30 June 2009 (Italian)
- "UFFICIALE: scambio tra Chievo e Vicenza" (in Italian). Tutto Mercato Web. 24 June 2009. Retrieved 4 August 2012.
- "Campionato "D. Berretti": Spezia-Valenzana 3-0" (in Italian). Spezia Calcio. 13 April 2010. Retrieved 20 February 2014.
- Vicenza Calcio SpA Report and Accounts on 30 June 2012 (Italian)
