= AC Sangiustese =

Italian football club

Sangiustese
- Full name: Associazione Calcio Sangiustese
- Nickname: Stese
- Founded: 1956
- Dissolved: 2011
- Ground: Stadio Villa San Filippo, Monte San Giusto, Italy
- Capacity: 1,487
- Manager: Stefano Senigagliesi
- 2017–18: Serie D, 9th
Home colours	Away colours

Associazione Calcio Sangiustese was an Italian association football club located in Monte San Giusto, Marche. It plays in Serie D.

== History ==
It was founded in 1956 and played in 2008–09 Lega Pro Seconda Divisione, after having been crowned as Serie D/F winners in 2007–08.

In July 2010, because the club did not fulfill the financial requirement, it was expelled from professional league and restarted from Eccellenza.

In the next season in Eccellenza Marche the club was relegated to Promozione and dissolved in the summer 2011.

== Colors and badge ==
The team's colours are red and blue.
