= Giampietro Perrulli =

Italian footballer

Personal information
- Date of birth: 8 June 1985 (age 41)
- Place of birth: Rome, Italy
- Height: 1.73 m (5 ft 8 in)
- Position: Winger

Team information
- Current team: Totti Sporting

Youth career
- Ostia Mare
- 2004: → Udinese (loan)

Senior career*
Years	Team	Apps	(Gls)
2001–2004	Ostia Mare	23	(2)
2004	→ Udinese (loan)	0	(0)
2004–2005	Viterbese	31	(7)
2005–2008	Ascoli	42	(4)
2005–2006	→ Sambenedettese (loan)	18	(1)
2008–2010	Vicenza	13	(0)
2009	→ Pescara (loan)	10	(0)
2010	→ Perugia (loan)	7	(0)
2011–2012	Carpi	18	(0)
2012–2013	Palestrina	24	(12)
2013–2015	Lupa Roma	38	(9)
2015–2016	Salernitana	18	(0)
2016	Lupa Roma	16	(1)
2016–2019	Cremonese	61	(1)
2019	Novara	10	(0)
2020–	Totti Sporting		
- * Club domestic league appearances and goals as of 15 May 2019

Giampietro Perrulli (born 8 June 1985) is a former Italian footballer who last played as a winger for Totti Sporting.

== Career ==
Perrulli started his career at Roman club Ostia Mare at Serie D. In January 2004 he was signed by Serie A team Udinese Calcio. However, he only played in its under-20 team, including a youth friendly as fullback.

=== Ascoli ===
In July 2005 he was signed by Ascoli. He also sold to Udinese (another "white-black" striped) in co-ownership deal on 31 August 2005. Before that deal Ascoli already agreed a loan deal to Sambenedettese, a town not far away from Ascoli Piceno. Perrulli played his first Serie A match on 14 May 2006 against Empoli F.C., after he returned to Ascoli Piceno in January 2006, which Ascoli also bought the remain 50% half from Udine. In the next season, he played 27 matches with only 8 start. He followed the team relegated to 2007–08 Serie B, played another 14 Serie B match with only two starts. That matches were on 25 September 2007 against Vicenza as a winger and on 26 January 2008 against Piacenza as a second forward.

=== Vicenza ===
In January 2008, he was signed by Vicenza along with Michelangelo Minieri. Ascoli got Evangelos Nastos in exchange and retained 50% registration on Perrulli.

After played nil at 2008–09 season, he was loaned to Pescara in January 2009. In June 2009 Vicenza gave up the remain 50% rights to Ascoli. In January 2010 he left for Perugia. Perrulli was trailed at A.S. Andria BAT in October 2010.

=== Carpi ===
On 2 September 2011 he was re-signed by Carpi after the 6-month deal expired.

=== Novara ===
On 31 January 2019, he was transferred to Novara. On 2 September 2019, his contract was dissolved by mutual consent.

=== Totti Sporting ===
In the winter 2020, Perrulli joined Italian amateur club Totti Sporting.
