= Matteo Cavagna (footballer, born 1984) =

Italian footballer

Personal information
- Date of birth: 13 January 1984 (age 42)
- Place of birth: Bergamo, Italy
- Height: 1.77 m (5 ft 9 1/2 in)
- Position: Winger

Youth career
- 2002–2003: A.C. Milan

Senior career*
Years	Team	Apps	(Gls)
2003–2004	Foligno	33	(3)
2004–2005	Oggiono	30	(11)
2005–2007	Foligno	44	(8)
2007–2009	Arezzo	48	(3)
2009–2012	Foligno	71	(15)
2012	Lecco	12	(5)
2012–2013	Pro Sesto	21	(4)
2013–2014	Mantova	12	(2)
Total		271	(51)
- * Club domestic league appearances and goals

Matteo Cavagna (born 13 January 1984) is an Italian footballer who plays as a winger.

== Career ==
Born in Bergamo, Lombardy, Cavagna started his career at A.C. Milan, played at their Primavera U20 Youth Team in 2002–03 season. He then played two season at Serie D clubs Foligno and Oggiono. In 2005-06 season, he was re-signed by Foligno, which promoted to Serie C2. In January 2007, he joined Serie B side Arezzo in a co-ownership deal. He followed the team relegated to Serie C1, and in June 2009 bought back by Foligno, which the team at that time at Lega Pro Prima Divisione (ex-Serie C1). In October 2009, he extended his contract, which lasted until 30 June 2012. He was the joint-topscorer of the team along with Stefano Giacomelli in 2009–10 Lega Pro Prima Divisione season.

== Honours ==
Foligno

- Serie C2: 2006–07
