= Filippo Mancini =

Italian footballer

Personal information
- Date of birth: 13 October 1990 (age 36)
- Place of birth: Genoa, Italy
- Positions: Right winger; forward

Youth career
- 2005–2008: Inter Milan
- 2008: → Manchester City (loan)
- 2008–2009: Monza
- 2009–2010: Bellaria – Igea Marina

Senior career*
Years	Team	Apps	(Gls)
2008	Inter Milan	0	(0)
2010–2011	Virtus Entella	0	(0)
2011–2013	Manchester City	0	(0)
- * Club domestic league appearances and goals

Filippo Mancini (born 13 October 1990) is an Italian former professional footballer who played as a forward.

== Career ==
=== Inter Milan ===
Son of former footballer Roberto Mancini, Filippo was born in Genoa when Roberto was playing for Sampdoria. He joined Inter Milan's Allievi Regionali team in 2005, when his father was the head coach of the first team. He made his first team debut coming on for the last 10 minutes in a 3–0 win against Reggina in the return leg of the 2007–08 Coppa Italia round of 16.

=== Reserve career ===
On 31 January 2008, Inter Milan announced to have loaned him to Manchester City. He was released by Inter in July 2008. In the 2008–09 season he left for Monza along with his younger brother Andrea (who had one year left on his contract with Inter and was loaned to Monza). Filippo was played for Monza's Berretti Under-20 squad. That season Inter also loaned several players to the Monza reserve side, namely, Paolo Campinoti, Luca D'Errico, Nicolò De Cesare, Giovanni Kyeremateng, Domenico Maiese, Niccolò Scaccabarozzi, Davide Tremolada and Maximiliano Uggè. The Berretti team finished as the runner-up of the league.

In August 2009 he was announced as having been signed by Lega Pro Seconda Divisione outfit Bellaria–Igea.

On 30 August 2010, he was signed by Virtus Entella.

He returned to Manchester City in 2011 with the reserve team. He played for the reserves (called Elite Development Squad) in the 2012–13 season.

In June 2013, he was released by Manchester City and became a free agent.

== Honours ==
Inter Primavera (Youth/Reserve Side)

- Campionato Nazionale Primavera (runner-up): 2008

Monza Berretti (Youth/Reserve Side)

- Campionato Nazionale Dante Berretti (runner-up): 2009
