= Andrea Vignali =

Italian footballer (born 1991)

Personal information
- Date of birth: 13 June 1991 (age 35)
- Place of birth: Massa, Tuscany, Italy
- Height: 1.71 m (5 ft 7 in)
- Position: Winger

Team information
- Current team: ASD Unione Montignoso 2005

Youth career
- 2005–2006: Internazionale
- 2006–2008: Spezia
- 2008–2011: Sassuolo

Senior career*
Years	Team	Apps	(Gls)
2011	Sassuolo	4	(0)
2011–2012	Mantova	4	(0)
2012–2014	Massese	59	(10)
2014–2015	Ponsaco	33	(5)
2015	Parma	5	(1)
2015–2016	Jolly Montemurlo	18	(0)
2016	Massese	10	(0)
2016–2016	Mezzolara	14	(3)
2017–2019	Real Forte	65	(10)
2019–2020	Lucchese	20	(5)
2020–2021	Union Feltre	11	(1)
2021	Vado	11	(3)
2021	PDHAE	11	(0)
2021	Real Forte	2	(0)
2021–2022	GS Fratres Perignano 2019		
2022–2025	Massese		
2025–	ASD Unione Montignoso 2005		
- * Club domestic league appearances and goals as of 9 February 2026

Andrea Vignali (born 13 June 1991) is an Italian footballer who plays as a winger for ASD Unione Montignoso 2005.

== Career ==
=== Youth career ===
Born in Massa, Tuscany, Vignali joined F.C. Internazionale Milano in 2005–06 season. He spent his sole season in Giovanissimi Nazionali under-15 team, as a forward. That season he scored 4 goals, as the 6th goalscorer of the team behind Mattia Destro, Joel Obi, Nicola Piras, Karim Laribi and Marco Puntoriere. (Except Obi and Laribi, all were forwards. Vignali only able to ahead other forward and wing forward such as Luca Tremolada and Giovanni Kyeremateng as 4th striker.) In August 2006 he was loaned to Spezia. In August 2007 Spezia signed Vignali outright along with Francesco Biasi and also loaned Paolo Campinoti and Alessio Lanotte from Inter academy. Vignali was a member of Allievi Nazionali under-17 team but also played a few time for the senior youth team Primavera.

Spezia bankrupted at the end of 2007–08 Serie B. Vignali joined another Serie B team Sassuolo. Sassuolo also signed number of players from Inter directly or indirectly. In 2009–10 season, he often played as an attacking midfielder or wing forward for Sassuolo's Primavera (literally "spring"), partnered with Umberto Bellani, Raffaele Conforto, Milan Jirásek (midfielder), Diego Falcinelli, Mame Baba Thiam (forward), Pellegrino Albanese (defender) and Alberto Gallinetta (goalkeeper), all former Inter players. Moreover, Giorgio Schiavini was also from Inter but already promoted to the first team in 2009–10 Serie B, and young Inter defender Nemanja Mitrović was a backup. Along with other youth product of Sassuolo, the team finished as the eleven (out of 14 team) in Group A. Vignali personally scored 2 goals. In the next season, Vignali was a midfielder of the team or one of the forwards (as wing forward) in 3–4–3 formation.

=== Senior career ===
Vignali also made his Serie B debut during 2010–11 Serie B. He replaced Andrea Catellani in the last minutes on 1 March 2011. That match Sassuolo won Pescara 2–0.

In July 2011 Vignali left for newly promoted Italian fourth division club Mantova in co-ownership deal along with Albanese. In June 2012 Vignali's registration rights was fully owned by Mantova.

However, he was soon released and joined Massese of Serie D.

== Honours ==
Inter youth

- Campionato Giovanissimi Nazionali: 2006
