= Luca D'Errico =

Italian footballer (born 1992)

Personal information
- Date of birth: 24 March 1992 (age 34)
- Place of birth: Milan, Italy
- Position: Midfielder

Team information
- Current team: Pavia

Youth career
- Pavia
- 2007–2009: Internazionale
- 2008–2009: → Monza (loan)
- 2009–2010: Monza

Senior career*
Years	Team	Apps	(Gls)
2010–	Pavia	3	(0)
- * Club domestic league appearances and goals

Luca D'Errico (born 24 March 1992) is an Italian footballer who plays as a midfielder for Prima Divisione club Pavia.

== Career ==
Born in Milan, Lombardy, Luca started his career along with his twin brother Andrea in A.C. Pavia. In 2007, he was signed by Internazionale and played a season at its Allievi Regionali team. In 2008, he was loaned to Monza along with Marco Buonanno, Paolo Campinoti, Nicolò De Cesare, Giovanni Kyeremateng, Domenico Maiese, Andrea Mancini, Mirko Santoro, Niccolò Scaccabarozzi, Davide Tremolada, Stefano Tresoldi, Maximiliano Uggè and Francesco Poltero (in January). He finished as the runner-up with its Berretti team. Monza bought him outright in August 2009 on free transfer, made Inter register a loss of €14,000 (the contract residual value).

Luca returned to Pavia during 2009–10 season. He also played matches as unused bench.

He made his league debut on 29 August 2010 as last minute substitute. He then played 2 more matches as sub.

He also played as a starter in the cup 3 times. He played the first match of the cup as unused sub.

== Honours ==
Monza youth

- Campionato Nazionale Dante Berretti Runner-up: 2009
