= Kyeremateng =

Kyeremateng or Kyerematen is a surname. Notable people with the surname include:

- Basty Kyeremateng (born 1987), Italian footballer
- Gabriel Kyeremateng (born 1999), German-Ghanaian footballer
- Giovanni Kyeremateng (born 1991), Italian footballer
- Nigel Kyeremateng (born 2000), Italian footballer
- Godfried Kyeremateng (born 1952), Former Director Of Human Resource, Electricity Company Of Ghana
- John Alan Kyerematen (born 1955), Ghanaian politician
- Martin Kyerematen, Ghanaian politician
