= Andrea Bavena =

Italian footballer (born 1990)

Personal information
- Date of birth: 4 March 1990 (age 36)
- Place of birth: Verbania, Italy
- Height: 1.83 m (6 ft 0 in)
- Position: Goalkeeper

Team information
- Current team: ACD Julia Sagittaria

Youth career
- Pro Patria
- 2005: → Internazionale (loan)
- 2005–2010: Internazionale
- 2007–2008: → Pro Sesto (loan)

Senior career*
Years	Team	Apps	(Gls)
2010–2013	Portogruaro	34	(0)
2013–2014	Mantova	13	(0)
2014–2015	Avellino	1	(0)
2015–2016	FeralpiSalò	6	(0)
2017	Caratese	12	(0)
2017–2020	ASD Città Di Caorle-La Salute		
2020–2022	Portogruaro		
2022	San Donà		
2022–2024	ASD SPAL Cordovado		
2024–	ACD Julia Sagittaria		

International career
2005–2006	Italy U16	4	(0)
2006	Italy U17	1	(0)
2011	Italy U21 Lega Pro	1	(0)
- * Club domestic league appearances and goals as of 10 February 2026

Andrea Bavena (born 4 March 1990) is an Italian footballer who plays as a goalkeeper for ACD Julia Sagittaria.

== Club career ==
=== Youth career ===
Born in Verbania, Piedmont, Bavena left for F.C. Internazionale Milano in January 2005 from Lombardy club Pro Patria. He played for Allievi Regionali in 2005–06 season to Allievi Nazionali under-17 team in 2006–07 season. As the Primavera team of the club had Enrico Alfonso, Vid Belec, Paolo Tornaghi and Paolo Branduani as keepers, as well as Inter closed its own Berretti u-18 team, he left for Pro Sesto along with teammates Samuele Beretta, Nicolò De Cesare, Mattia Dell'Aera and Davide Tremolada. Bavena was a member of Berretti under-20 team, the Lega Pro version of Primavera League. That season Pro Sesto also signed Cristiano Biraghi, Marco Buonanno, Domenico Maiese, Marco Puntoriere, Giovanni Kyeremateng (until January), Simone Fautario (until January), Fabio Perissinotto (since January) and Luca Profeta (since January) for its youth teams and first team.

Since returned from loan, he became a member of Primavera (literally Spring) under-20 team, as second keeper behind Belec, ahead Luca Stocchi. However, as both Bavena and Belec were ineligible to List B of UEFA Champions League, Stocchi was named in List B instead, as fourth keeper of the first team in 2008–09 UEFA Champions League.

=== Portogruaro ===
On 30 June 2010 he was sold to Portogruaro in co-ownership deal for a peppercorn fee of €500, rejoining Inter teammate Gabriele Puccio and Riccardo Bocalon. However, he remained in Primavera team as overage player. Bavena made his Serie B debut in the last round, as the club certainly relegated.

In June 2011 Inter gave up the remain 50% registration rights to Portogruaro.

In the next season he was the starting keeper, ahead Francesco Rossi and Michele Mion. However, in 2012–13 Lega Pro Prima Divisione, Bavena became the backup of Andrea Tozzo.

In January 2013 Bavena left for Mantova.

== International career ==
Bavena made his under-16 debut on 24 January 2006, against Portugal. In April, he received call-up to a youth tournament in Montaigu, Vendée, France. He was the backup of Sergio Viotti in that tournament, finished as the runner-up. He played his first and last match for Italy U-17 team on 25 September. He was dropped from the squad before the start of the qualification.

He returned to the youth system in February 2011, which he received a call-up from Italy under-21 Serie B representative team for a training camp. In 2011–12 season, he was the member of Italy Lega Pro under-20 representative team, for a training camp and practice match. In November 2011 he played against Palestine Olympic team.

== Honours ==
Pro Sesto youth

- Campionato Nazionale Dante Berretti: 2008
