= Marco Puntoriere =

Italian footballer

Personal information
- Date of birth: 1 August 1991 (age 35)
- Place of birth: Reggio Calabria, Italy
- Height: 1.81 m (5 ft 11 1/2 in)
- Position: Forward

Team information
- Current team: USD Palmese
- Number: 91

Youth career
- 2004–2005: Scuola Calcio Reggio 2000
- 2005–2009: Inter Milan
- 2007–2008: → Pro Sesto (loan)
- 2008–2009: → Benevento (loan)
- 2009–2010: Mantova

Senior career*
Years	Team	Apps	(Gls)
2010	Catanzaro	7	(1)
2011	Sambonifacese	7	(1)
2011–2012	Vibonese	21	(4)
2012	Celano	15	(1)
2012	Riccione	2	(0)
2012–2013	Acireale	9	(0)
2013–2014	HinterReggio	29	(6)
2014–2015	Due Torri	28	(12)
2015	Agropoli	15	(5)
2015–2016	Cavese	10	(0)
2016	Sicula Leonzio	3	(0)
2016–2017	US San Teodoro	17	(7)
2017	US Tortolì Calcio 1953	5	(0)
2017–2018	AC Locri		
2018–2019	Castrovillari	39	(15)
2019–2020	FC Francavilla	12	(0)
2020	FBC Gravina	5	(2)
2020–2021	Afragolese 1944	8	(3)
2021	Castrovillari	12	(3)
2021–2022	Nardò	32	(13)
2022–2024	USD Palmese	55	(15)
2024	Termoli	12	(2)
2024–2025	FC Pompei	17	(3)
2025–2026	ASD Heraclea Calcio	10	(1)
2026–	USD Palmese	15	(3)

International career
2011	Italy U20 Lega Pro	2	(0)
- * Club domestic league appearances and goals as of 11 October 2026

Marco Puntoriere (born 1 August 1991) is an Italian footballer who plays as a forward for USD Palmese.

== Career ==
Born in Reggio Calabria, Calabria, Puntoriere joined Internazionale in 2005. That season he won the champion with Giovanissimi Nazionali team. In 2007, he left Inter's Allievi Regionali team and loaned to Pro Sesto along with Andrea Bavena, Cristiano Biraghi, Samuele Beretta, Marco Buonanno, Nicolò De Cesare, Mattia Dell'Aera, Domenico Maiese, Davide Tremolada, Giovanni Kyeremateng (until January), Fabio Perissinotto (since January) and Luca Profeta (since January). In the next season, he left for Benevento along with Alessio Lanotte. In July 2009, he was signed by Serie B club Mantova. He also played once against Inter in 2009–10 Campionato Nazionale Primavera.

After the club went bankrupt in 2010, he was signed by Seconda Divisione club Catanzaro. He made his first start in round 6, partnered with Stefano Morello and played 3 more games as starting line-up in round 7, 9 and 11.

In January 2011 he left for Sambonifacese and on 31 August 2011, he was signed by Vibonese.

On 5 December 2019, Puntoriere moved to Serie D club F.C. Francavilla.
