= Luca Profeta =

Italian footballer (born 1990)

Personal information
- Date of birth: 22 February 1990 (age 36)
- Place of birth: Milan, Italy
- Position: Right back

Youth career
- 2002–2008: Internazionale
- 2008: → Pro Sesto (loan)

Senior career*
Years	Team	Apps	(Gls)
2008–2010	Colognese		
2010–2011	Pergocrema	1	(0)
2012	Rudianese	12	(0)
2012–2013	SSD Cynthia 1920	2	(0)
2013–2014	Crema		
2014–2015	Orceana		
2015–2016	US Offanenghese		
2016–2017	Rivoltana Calcio		
2017–2018	Verolese		
2018–2020	US Soresinese Calcio		
2020–2021	AC Romanengo		
2021–2022	USD Soncinese		

International career
2006	Italy U16	4	(0)
- * Club domestic league appearances and goals as of 9 February 2026

Luca Profeta (born 22 February 1990) is an Italian footballer who plays as a right back.

== Club career ==
Born in Milan, Lombardy, Profeta spent his youth career at Internazionale, at first as a midfielder. He played from Giovanissimi Regionali B Team to Allievi Nazionali Team (2006–07 season). In January 2008, he was loaned to Pro Sesto along with Fabio Perissinotto, rejoining Inter team-mate Andrea Bavena, Cristiano Biraghi, Samuele Beretta, Marco Buonanno, Nicolò De Cesare, Mattia Dell'Aera, Domenico Maiese, Marco Puntoriere and Davide Tremolada. He then spent 2 seasons with Serie D club Colognese. In 2009–10 season he played 27 times.

In August 2010, he was signed by Prima Divisione club Pergocrema. He played once for the club at 2010–11 Coppa Italia Lega Pro, against Renate.

== International career ==
Profeta only played for Italy at U-16 level. Profeta received his first call-up to 2005 Torneo Giovanile di Natale In December 2005. He finished as a runner-up in a youth tournament held in Montaigu, Vendée, France. He played 3 out of possible 4 matches, only missed the round 2 and started twice in round 1 and 3.

== Honours ==
Pro Sesto youth

- Campionato Nazionale Dante Berretti: 2008
