= Andrea Bertin =

Italian footballer (born 1992)

Personal information
- Date of birth: 27 February 1992 (age 34)
- Place of birth: Carate Brianza, Italy
- Height: 1.78 m (5 ft 10 in)
- Position: Right-back

Youth career
- 2004–2009: Internazionale
- 2009–2010: Chievo

Senior career*
Years	Team	Apps	(Gls)
2010–2011	Pro Patria	11	(0)
2011–2013	Mantova	58	(0)
2014–2016	USD Mariano Calcio		
Total		69	(0)
- * Club domestic league appearances and goals

Andrea Bertin (born 27 February 1992) is an Italian former footballer who played as a right-back.

== Career ==
=== Youth career ===
Born in Carate Brianza, the Province of Monza and Brianza (historically in the Province of Milan), Bertin, also known as Bertinelli, started his career at Internazionale. He played for its Giovanissimi Regionali B under-14 team in 2004–05 season to Allievi Nazionali under-17 team in 2008–09 season. Bertin finished as the runner-up of Allievi Nazionali League in June 2009 as starting right-back. Bertin also played as a centre-back in 3–5–2 formation for Allievi and also played once for Primavera.

On 31 August 2009, Bertin moved to fellow Serie A club Chievo in temporary deal, re-joining former teammate Nestor Djengoue and Daniele Co. That season Inter did not have its Berretti under-18 team in its youth rank and no room for Bertin in Primavera, as the club already promoted Felice Natalino and Cristiano Biraghi from Allievi as well as had senior member likes Giulio Donati and Davide Santon. Bertin was a member of Chievo's Primavera under-20 team, as a starting defender along with Djengoue.

He started his consulting career at KPMG Advisory in 2017. Never played soccer after that.

=== Lega Pro clubs ===
On 12 August 2010 Bertin was signed by Chievo on free transfer, after Inter signed another fullback Davide Faraoni, but Bertin was immediately left for Pro Patria in co-ownership deal for a peppercorn fee of €500, rejoining teammate Amedeo Benedetti. In June 2011 both clubs failed to agree the price of the remain 50% registration rights before the deadline. On 24 June both clubs submitted their bid to Lega Serie A in a sealed envelope. On 25 June the League committee announced that Chievo bought back Bertin for €1,000

Bertin was immediately left for Mantova along with Andrea Burato, also in Lega Pro Seconda Divisione. Bertin was the starting right-back (wing-back) of the team in 4–4–2 formation or 3–5–2 formation, ahead Pellegrino Albanese, former Inter teammate and Sebastiano Girelli, experienced Mantovani. Bertin also selected to the representative team of the second division group B, for 2012 Lega Pro Quadrangular Tournament. Bertin was the starting defender of the team, and finished as the fourth.
