= Nestor Djengoue =

Cameroonian footballer

Personal information
- Full name: Nestor Hervé Djengoue
- Date of birth: 26 April 1991 (age 35)
- Place of birth: Douala, Cameroon
- Height: 1.88 m (6 ft 2 in)
- Position: Defender

Team information
- Current team: BSV Schwarz-Weiß Rehden

Youth career
- 2006–2007: Noventa
- 2007–2008: Inter Milan
- 2008–2011: Chievo

Senior career*
Years	Team	Apps	(Gls)
2010–2013	Chievo	0	(0)
2012	→ Lumezzane (loan)	6	(0)
2012–2013	→ NK Zagreb (loan)	22	(1)
2013–2014	FSV Frankfurt	10	(0)
2014–2015	Energie Cottbus	7	(0)
2016	BFC Dynamo	12	(2)
2016–2017	FSV Wacker 90 Nordhausen	8	(2)
2017–2020	FSV Frankfurt	61	(6)
2020–2021	Eintracht Stadtallendorf	11	(0)
2022–2023	Phönix Lübeck	9	(0)
2023–2024	VfR Mannheim	26	(2)
2024–	BSV Schwarz-Weiß Rehden	0	(0)
- * Club domestic league appearances and goals as of 1 June 2024

Nestor Hervé Djengoue (born 26 April 1991) is a Cameroonian footballer who plays for German side BSV Schwarz-Weiß Rehden. He made his professional debut for Chievo in 2010–11 Coppa Italia.

== Biography ==
=== Youth career ===
Born in Cameroon, Djengoue spent one season with Inter Milan's Allievi Nazionali youth team where he played as a midfielder. However, he also played as a fullback occasionally. Before hemoved to Inter, he played for Veneto side Noventa Calcio and was selected for the Allievi regional representative team in 2007, winning the trophy with Veneto. Inter signed him for around €40,000 to €50,000. When Inter released Djengoue on 1 September 2008, made Inter had to write-down the non amortised contract value of around €32,000.

He moved in 2008 to Chievo, another Veneto team, for free along with team-mate Daniele Co and Paolo Marchi (loan), re-joining former team-mate Nicola Piras. Djengoue was a full-back for its Primavera team but also played as a centre-back. In the first season, Marchi occupied one of the fullback spots and in the second season Andrea Bertin, another Inter youth product.

=== Chievo ===
In the 2010–11 season, he made his debut in Coppa Italia, in which he played twice. In the 2011–12 season, Djengoue was an overage player for the Primavera. That season he changed to wear no.26 shirt (from No.91) for the first team.

Djengoue also played for the first team in a pre-season friendly as a centre-back. He was only able to play once for Chievo in the 2011–12 Coppa Italia as right-back. That cup match both teams fielded inferior players and Chievo won 3–0. Djengoue failed to enter the squad in the next round against Udinese, which Chievo qualified again.
