= Paolo Marchi =

Italian footballer

Personal information
- Date of birth: 4 May 1991 (age 35)
- Place of birth: Milan, Italy
- Height: 1.85 m (6 ft 1 in)
- Position: Defender

Team information
- Current team: Folgore Caratese

Youth career
- 2001–2010: Internazionale
- 2008–2009: → Chievo (loan)
- 2010–2011: Varese

Senior career*
Years	Team	Apps	(Gls)
2011–2012	Varese	0	(0)
2011–2012	→ Carpi (loan)	1	(0)
2012	→ Casale (loan)	9	(0)
2012–2015	Como	65	(2)
2015–2017	Pordenone	30	(3)
2017–2019	FeralpiSalò	54	(2)
2019–2021	Reggina	3	(0)
2020–2021	→ Ravenna (loan)	15	(0)
2021	→ Piacenza (loan)	13	(0)
2021–2022	Piacenza	33	(0)
2022–2023	Sangiuliano City	12	(0)
2023–	Folgore Caratese	14	(0)
- * Club domestic league appearances and goals as of 20 December 2023

Paolo Marchi (born 4 May 1991) is an Italian footballer who plays as a defender for Serie D club Folgore Caratese.

== Club career ==
=== Youth career ===
Born in Milan, Lombardy, Marchi started his career at hometown club F.C. Internazionale Milano from Pulcini A team (U11) in the 2001–02 season to Allievi Nazionali U17 team (National Student League) in 2007–08 season. As Inter closed down its Berretti U18 team in 2006, Marchi left for Chievo's Primavera U20 team ("Spring" team) instead of promoted to Inter's reserve directly. Chievo also signed Nestor Djengoue and Daniele Co on a free transfer. Marchi was a regular for Chievo reserve as a fullback.

On 1 July 2009, Marchi returned to Inter's "spring" reserve. However, Marchi failed to play any game. On 31 August 2010 Marchi left for Varese along with Matteo Romanini (who spent a year in Brescia) on free transfer, re-joining Inter teammate Matteo Bianchetti who just graduated from U17 team. Varese was the runner-up of the reserve league, losing to Roma 2–3. In the final, Inter owned player Jaime Serrano was the left back instead, as Marchi was suspended (2nd yellow card in the semi-finals)

=== Senior career ===
On 18 July 2011, Marchi left for Carpi in temporary deal. On 17 January 2012 Marchi changed to play for Casale. From 2012 to 2014 Marchi left for Calcio Como in temporary deals.

On 13 July 2014, he returned to Como for their pre-season camp.

On 26 August 2015, he was signed by Pordenone in a two-year contract.

On 17 July 2019, he signed a 2-year contract with Reggina. On 26 September 2020, he joined Ravenna on loan. On 1 February 2021, he moved to Piacenza. On 26 June 2021, he moved to Piacenza on a permanent basis, signing a two-year contract.

On 8 July 2022, he joined Serie C club Sangiuliano City.

== Honours ==
- National Student League: 2008
- National Junior League: 2006
