= Giorgio Schiavini =

Italian footballer

Personal information
- Date of birth: 29 October 1990 (age 36)
- Place of birth: Crema, Italy
- Height: 1.77 m (5 ft 10 in)
- Position: Midfielder

Team information
- Current team: Inter Milan (women) (coach)

Youth career
- 2004–2008: Inter
- 2008: → Pizzighettone (loan)
- 2008–2010: Sassuolo

Senior career*
Years	Team	Apps	(Gls)
2010–2012	Sassuolo	1	(0)
2010–2011	→ Fano (loan)	21	(2)
2011–2012	→ Santarcangelo (loan)	29	(7)
2012–2013	FeralpiSalò	10	(0)
2013–2014	Mantova	28	(2)
2014–2016	Pro Piacenza	52	(3)
2016–2018	Fano	54	(3)
2018–2019	Pergolettese	20	(1)
- * Club domestic league appearances and goals as of 1 July 2019

Giorgio Schiavini (born 29 October 1990) is an Italian football coach who is currently the assistant coach of Inter women first team, and a former player who played as a midfielder.

== Club career ==
=== Internazionale ===
Born in Crema, Lombardy, Schiavini started his career at F.C. Internazionale Milano. Schiavini had played for its Giovanissimi Nazionali under-15 team in the 2004–05 season to Primavera under-20 team in the 2007–08 season. That season he also named in the B squad of Champions League. It is because Inter had signed number of footballers for its academy (or had been loaned out, made his Inter career interrupted), made only a few players were eligible to List B of UEFA. (another midfielder is Gabriele Puccio, while Francesco Bolzoni already in List A 25-men main squad)

In January 2008 he was loaned to Pizzighettone. He played for its under-20 team in Berretti League.

=== Sassuolo ===
From August 2008 to June 2010 Schiavini was loaned to Sassuolo along with numbers of Inter youth product, such as Pellegrino Albanese (2008–10), Mame Baba Thiam (2009–10) and Alberto Gallinetta (2009–10). Schiavini was a regular member for Sassuolo's "spring" under-20 team in 2008–09 season, but played less regularly in 2009–10 as he was allowed to train with the first team. Schiavini made his Serie B debut in the last round (round 42), as a starter. That match, Sassuolo 0–0 drew with the champion Lecce.

At the end of 2009–10 Serie B, Sassuolo signed Schiavini in co-ownership deal for a peppercorn fee of €500. In July 2010 he was loaned to Lega Pro Seconda Divisione team Fano along with Nicola Ferrari. Schiavini played 21 out of the possible 30 matches of the season. He missed twice due to suspension (4th caution and one sent off). In June 2011, Inter gave up the remain 50% registration rights to Sassuolo.

=== Lega Pro clubs ===
In July 2011, he left Sassuolo again for a team from the same region, along with Alex Lodovisi. He played 29 times with Santarcangelo in the fourth division.

Schiavini returned to his home region on 9 July 2012 after Sassuolo farmed him to FeralpiSalò in a new co-ownership deal. In January 2013 he was injured in rectus femoris muscle and missed the rest of the season.

On 15 July 2013, he left for Mantova.

On 13 July 2014 he left for Pro Piacenza.

== International career ==
Schiavini received his first national team call-up for Torneo Giovanile di Natale (Christmas Youth Tournament) in December 2004. He also attended the U-16 training camp in 2005–06 season. In October 2006 he attended another training camp, but for U-17 team. However, he never made his national team debut.
