= Samuele Beretta =

Italian footballer (born 1990)

Personal information
- Date of birth: 5 August 1990 (age 36)
- Place of birth: Verbania, Italy
- Height: 1.75 m (5 ft 9 in)
- Position: Midfielder

Team information
- Current team: Livorno Ferraris Bianzè

Youth career
- –2005: Borgomanero
- 2005–2010: Internazionale
- 2007–2008: → Pro Sesto (loan)

Senior career*
| Years | Team | Apps | (Gls) |
| 2010–2013 | Internazionale | 0 | (0) |
| 2010–2011 | → Pavia (loan) | 17 | (0) |
| 2011–2012 | → Cuneo (loan) | 3 | (0) |
| 2012–2013 | Juventus Domo | | |
| 2013 | Stresa Sportiva | | |
| 2013–2014 | Baveno Calcio | | |
| 2014–2019 | Orizzonti United | | |
| 2019–2021 | Borgaro Nobis | | |
| 2021–2024 | Alicese Canavese Orizzonti | | |
| 2024– | Livorno Ferraris Bianzè | | |
- * Club domestic league appearances and goals

Samuele Beretta (born 5 August 1990) is an Italian footballer who plays as a midfielder for Livorno Ferraris Bianzè.

== Career ==
=== Early career ===
Born in Verbania, Piedmont, Beretta started his career with Borgomanero. In 2005, he was signed by Internazionale. He spent the first season with Allievi Regionali under-16 team, as the team's third striker, behind Leonardo D'Angelo and Mattia Dell'Aera. In the 2006–07 season, he was promoted to Allievi Nazionali U-17 team, as third striker (4 goals in regular season), behind Mario Balotelli (18 goals) and Mattia Destro (nine). He also scored 1 of the 6 Inter's goals in the playoff round.

In 2007–08 season, he was loaned to Pro Sesto youth team along with Andrea Bavena, Nicolò De Cesare, Dell'Aera, Davide Tremolada, Giovanni Kyeremateng (until January), Fabio Perissinotto (since January) and Luca Profeta (since January).

On 1 July 2008, he returned to the Inter youth system as a member of Primavera U-20 team, as 4th striker behind Aiman Napoli, Destro and Riccardo Bocalon. He was often deployed as a winger) and in 2009–10 season partnered with Destro and Alen Stevanović in the 433 formation.

In 2009–10 Serie A season, he also played once for Inter first team in a friendly match, featuring a mix of first-team players which did not receive international call-up and a few Primavera team players.

=== Inter & loans ===
In July 2010, he was loaned to Lega Pro Prima Divisione club Pavia He made his debut on 5 September 2010, the 3 round of the 1st Divisione Group A. The coach lost Marco Tattini (international duty), and Beretta was in the starting XI in that match. Pavia won Spezia 2–1.

On 30 August 2011, he left for Cuneo on loan.

== Later career ==
After having played for Juventus Domo, Stresa Sportiva, Baveno Calcio and Orizzonti United as captain for five years, Beretta joined Borgaro Nobis ahead of the 2019–20 season.

== Honours ==
Pro Sesto youth

- Campionato Nazionale Dante Berretti: 2008
