= Campinoti =

Campinoti is an Italian surname. Notable people with the surname include:

- Paolo Campinoti (born 1990), Italian footballer
