= Porcino =

Porcino may refer to:

- Boletus edulis, an edible mushroom
- Al Porcino (1925–2013), American jazz trumpeter
- Antonio Porcino (born 1995), Italian professional footballer
