= Pellegrino Albanese =

Italian footballer (born 1991)

Personal information
- Date of birth: 4 February 1991 (age 35)
- Place of birth: Avellino, Italy
- Height: 1.87 m (6 ft 2 in)
- Positions: Left-back; centre-back

Youth career
- Anastasio Salvatore
- 2007–2008: Internazionale
- 2008–2011: Sassuolo

Senior career*
Years	Team	Apps	(Gls)
2011	Sassuolo	1	(0)
2011–2012	Mantova	3	(0)
2012–2013	Arzanese	4	(0)
2013–2014	Msida St. Joseph	20	(4)
2014–2015	Real Vico Equense	30	(3)
2015–2016	AV Herculaneum 1924	25	(3)
2016	Taranto	2	(0)
2017	Nocerina	11	(1)
2017–2018	Portici	32	(1)
2018	Turris	0	(0)
2018	Taranto	0	(0)
2018–2019	Agnonese	20	(0)
2019–2020	Portici	10	(0)
2020–2021	Matese	32	(1)
2021	Pineto	0	(0)
2021–2022	Matese	27	(1)
2022–2023	FC Pompei		
2023–2025	Albalonga	32	(0)
- * Club domestic league appearances and goals as of 10 February 2026

Pellegrino Albanese (born 4 February 1991) is an Italian footballer who plays as a left back.

== Club career ==
Born in Avellino, Campania, Albanese started his career at Basilicata team Anastasio Salvatore (in Pignola). In 2007, he was loaned to Inter Milan, where he played as a midfielder. Despite not being a regular member of the Allievi Nazionali (under-17 team), Inter bought him but loaned Albanese to Sassuolo along with Umberto Bellani and Giorgio Schiavini. In August 2009, Sassuolo signed him on a free transfer and also loaned a number of other footballers from Inter, such as Alberto Gallinetta and Mame Baba Thiam. Albanese was a regular member for Sassuolo's Primavera (under-20 team). He plays as a right back.

Albanese made his first team debut on 27 March 2011. He came on as a substitute for Daniele Quadrini in the second half. At that time Sassuolo was already losing 0–3. The game was eventually won by Siena (4–0).

In July 2011, Albanese was transferred to newly promoted Italian fourth division club Mantova in a co-ownership deal along with Andrea Vignali. He played 3 out of the first 4 rounds of the 2011–12 Lega Pro Seconda Divisione season as an emergency left back. However, he then did not play a part in any subsequent games as the team had Inter youth product Andrea Bertin as right-back and Davide Bersi as left-back.

Following this experience, Albanese decided accept an offer from Malta. In October 2013, he joined Maltese Division 1 side Msida Saint-Joseph where he was the first signing of newly instated president, Carmine Ferrara.

== Honours ==
Inter youth team

- Campionato Allievi Nazionali: 2008
