= Nigel Kyeremateng =

Italian footballer

Personal information
- Full name: Nigel Brian Kyeremateng
- Date of birth: 29 January 2000 (age 26)
- Place of birth: Novara, Italy
- Height: 1.80 m (5 ft 11 in)
- Position: Winger

Team information
- Current team: Lanciano FC

Youth career
- –2011: Monza
- 2011–2017: AC Milan
- 2017–2019: Novara

Senior career*
Years	Team	Apps	(Gls)
2019–2021	Novara	3	(0)
2019–2020	→ Caratese (loan)	17	(1)
2021–2022	Teramo	15	(0)
2022	→ Fermana (loan)	14	(0)
2022–2023	Gelbison	20	(2)
2023	United Riccione	11	(1)
2023–	Cjarlins Muzane	4	(0)

International career^{‡}
2015	Italy U16	2	(0)
- * Club domestic league appearances and goals as of 20 December 2023 ‡ National team caps and goals as of 26 August 2015

Nigel Brian Kyeremateng (born 29 January 2000) is an Italian professional footballer who plays as a winger for Serie D club Cjarlins Muzane.

== Club career ==
Born in Novara, Kyeremateng started his career in Monza and AC Milan Primavera teams. He joined to local club Novara in 2017, and made his professional debut in Serie C on 12 December 2018 against Alessandria. He left Novara on 2 February 2021 by mutual consent.

On 10 February 2021, he signed with Serie C club Teramo.

On 12 January 2022, he was loaned to Fermana.

On 5 September 2022, Kyeremateng moved to Gelbison, newly promoted to Serie C.

== International career ==
Kyeremateng played two matches for Italy U16 in 2015.

== Personal life ==
His brothers Giovanni Kyeremateng and Basty Kyeremateng are also footballers. He is of Ghanaian descent.
