= Simone Perico =

Italian footballer

Personal information
- Date of birth: 10 August 1989 (age 37)
- Place of birth: Seriate, Italy
- Height: 1.80 m (5 ft 11 in)
- Position: Defender

Team information
- Current team: Virtus CiseranoBergamo

Youth career
- –2008: Atalanta

Senior career*
Years	Team	Apps	(Gls)
2008–2009	Atalanta	0	(0)
2008–2009	→ Poggibonsi (loan)	7	(0)
2009–2010	Pro Sesto	19	(0)
2010–2011	Barletta	5	(0)
2011–2014	Pontisola	90	(8)
2014–2023	Giana Erminio	269	(24)
2023–	Virtus CiseranoBergamo	0	(0)
- * Club domestic league appearances and goals as of 7 May 2023

Simone Perico (born 10 August 1989) is an Italian footballer who plays as a defender for Serie D club Virtus CiseranoBergamo.

== Career ==
Born in Seriate, the Province of Bergamo, Perico started his career with Atalanta Bergamo, then left for Poggibonsi in 2008 In 2009, he left for another Lega Pro Seconda Divisione club Pro Sesto. He played 21 times for the bottom team.

On 11 September 2010, he signed a 1-year contract with Lega Pro Prima Divisione club Barletta on free transfer. He was immediately included in the starting XI, ahead Alessio Lanotte as defender.
