= Roberto Mancini =

Italian football manager (born 1964)

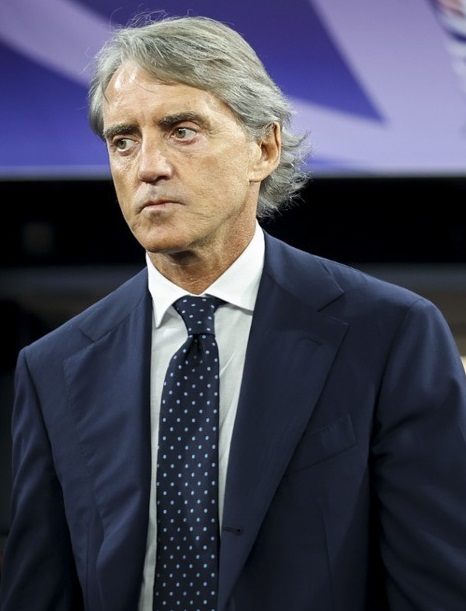
- Mancini as Saudi Arabia manager in 2024

Personal information
- Full name: Roberto Mancini
- Date of birth: 27 November 1964 (age 61)
- Place of birth: Jesi, Italy
- Height: 1.79 m (5 ft 10 in)
- Positions: Forward; attacking midfielder

Team information
- Current team: Italy (head coach)

Senior career*
Years	Team	Apps	(Gls)
1980–1982	Bologna	30	(9)
1982–1997	Sampdoria	424	(132)
1997–2001	Lazio	87	(15)
2001	→ Leicester City (loan)	4	(0)
Total		545	(156)

International career
1982–1986	Italy U21	26	(9)
1984–1994	Italy	36	(4)

Managerial career
- 2001–2002: Fiorentina
- 2002–2004: Lazio
- 2004–2008: Inter Milan
- 2009–2013: Manchester City
- 2013–2014: Galatasaray
- 2014–2016: Inter Milan
- 2017–2018: Zenit Saint Petersburg
- 2018–2023: Italy
- 2023–2024: Saudi Arabia
- 2025–2026: Al-Sadd
- 2026–: Italy
Medal record
Men's football
Representing Italy (as manager)
UEFA European Championship
Winner	2020 Europe
CONMEBOL–UEFA Cup of Champions
Runner-up	2022 England
UEFA Nations League
Third place	2023 Netherlands
Third place	2021 Italy
Representing Italy (as player)
FIFA World Cup
Third place	1990 Italy
UEFA European Championship
Third place	1988 West Germany
- * Club domestic league appearances and goals

Roberto Mancini Grande Ufficiale OMRI (Italian: [roˈbɛrto manˈtʃiːni]; born 27 November 1964) is an Italian football manager and former player who is the head coach of the Italy national team.

As a player, Mancini operated as a deep-lying forward, and was best known for his time at Sampdoria, where he played more than 550 matches, and helped the team win their first Serie A league title, four Coppa Italia titles, and the European Cup Winners' Cup. He was capped 36 times for Italy, taking part in UEFA Euro 1988 and the 1990 FIFA World Cup, achieving semi-final finishes in both tournaments, although he was never put onto the pitch during the 1990 tournament. In 1997, after 15 years at Sampdoria, Mancini left the club to join Lazio, where he won a further scudetto and Cup Winners' Cup, in addition to the UEFA Super Cup and two more Coppa Italia titles. Alongside Gianluigi Buffon, he is the player with the most Coppa Italia titles (6). As a player, Mancini would often give team talks at half-time. Towards the end of his playing career, he became an assistant to Sven-Göran Eriksson at Lazio.

His first manager role was in 2001 at Fiorentina, which he led to a Coppa Italia title. The following season, he took over as manager at Lazio, where he guided the club to another Coppa Italia title. In 2004, Mancini was offered the manager's job at Inter Milan, with which he won three consecutive Serie A titles, a club record; he was dismissed in 2008. After being out of football for over a year, Mancini was appointed Manchester City manager in December 2009. He helped City win the FA Cup in the 2010–11 season, the club's first major trophy in 35 years, and their first league title in 44 years in the 2011–12 season. Mancini took over managerial duties at Turkish club Galatasaray in September 2013, winning the Turkish Cup in his only season at the club, before returning to Inter Milan for two more years before managing Russian side Zenit. In 2018, he took charge of the Italy national football team after the team had failed to qualify for the 2018 FIFA World Cup. In 2021, Mancini guided Italy to their second-ever European Championship at Euro 2020. Under his management, the team was unbeaten from October 2018 to October 2021, and holds the world record for most consecutive matches without defeat (37), but Italy then failed to reach the World Cup for the second time in a row after a play-off loss to North Macedonia.

Mancini has reached at least a semi-final of a major national cup competition in every season he has been a manager, from 2002 to 2014. He holds a number of records, including most consecutive Coppa Italia finals from 2004 to 2008, with Lazio once in 2004 and with Inter Milan in the following four seasons.

== Early life ==
Mancini was born in Jesi, Marche, Italy, on 27 November 1964, but then moved onto the mountain town of Roccadaspide in Campania and was raised by Aldo and Marianna Mancini along with his younger sister Stephanie. He had served as an altar boy in his youth. In 2012, Mancini made a religious pilgrimage to the site of Our Lady of Medugorje and had stated that he is a believer who prays regularly, "The world would be a better place if everyone practiced the art of praying."

== Club career ==
=== Sampdoria ===
Mancini debuted in Serie A for Bologna in 1981. The following year, he was bought by Sampdoria, for £2.2 million, whom he played for until 1997. With Sampdoria, he formed a dynamic strike partnership with Gianluca Vialli under manager Vujadin Boškov, which earned the pair the nickname The Goal Twins ("I Gemelli del Gol", in Italian). Together, they helped the club to its only league title in 1991, four Coppa Italias and a Cup Winners' Cup in 1990. He also appeared in the final of the 1991–92 European Cup against Barcelona. At 27, Mancini sat on the interview panel that selected Sven-Göran Eriksson as manager. Mancini often delivered the team talk for Sampdoria. He attended board meetings and had a say in transfer business. In David Platt's 1995 autobiography, Achieving the Goal, he described the day he met Sampdoria in Genoa while playing for Bari and, lining up in the tunnel, became aware that Mancini was looking his way. Platt wrote: "I thought nothing of it until he asked me, very matter-of-factly, if I was staying at Bari. Outright, he asked if I wanted to join Sampdoria. Mancini had been at the club for years and was almost a son to the president, Paolo Mantovani". Mancini kept in touch when Platt moved to Juventus and eventually helped bring him to Sampdoria. At that stage, Mancini had established himself as the most powerful voice in the Blucerchiati dressing room.

As a teenager at Sampdoria, Mancini was not someone who liked his authority being questioned. After Trevor Francis signed from Manchester City in 1982, aggrieved that his place was under threat, the 18-year-old Mancini ended up picking a fight with 28-year-old Francis on the training ground. A similar incident occurred with Liam Brady, who was eight years older. Additionally, Juan Sebastián Verón tells the story of swearing in Mancini's direction during an argument about a badly-taken corner. After the match, Mancini had stripped off to the waist and was waiting to fight him. "He is not an easy person, you know," Verón says. "He has this complicated personality".

=== Lazio ===
With Lazio, Mancini won his second scudetto and Cup Winners' Cup titles, as well as two more Coppa Italias. In the 1999–00 season, Lazio won the scudetto and Coppa Italia, but Mancini failed to score in 20 matches and later announced his playing retirement. He joined Lazio's coaching staff as Sven-Göran Eriksson's number two. In 2011, when asked about Mancini, Eriksson said: "I took him to Lazio with me and he wanted to be a manager even while he was a player. He was the coach, he was the kit man, he was the bus driver, everything. At Sampdoria he wanted to check that everything was in place before training. Sometimes I would have to tell him: 'Mancio, you have a game to play on Sunday, you will be exhausted if you have to control everything.' But he was like that."He is a Lazio Legend and will always be remembered.

=== Leicester City ===
Joining Leicester City on loan in January 2001, Mancini made his Premier League debut against Arsenal at the age of 36, but failed to complete a full 90 minutes in his five appearances for the club. In early February, he was given leave of absence, citing personal reasons. He telephoned the club on 14 February, however, and informed them he would not be returning to England; he had been offered the manager's job at Fiorentina. Despite this, he cites his time at Leicester City as the period during which he fell in love with the English game, and which later prompted him to accept the job at Manchester City.

== International career ==
Despite success at club level, Mancini never became a regular for Italy. At the under-21 level, Mancini was part of the team which reached the semi-finals in the 1984 UEFA European Under-21 Football Championship and finished runners-up in 1986. He made his international senior squad debut at the age of 19, under Enzo Bearzot, on 26 May 1984, in a 2–0 away win against Canada in Toronto; he later won 36 caps, and scored four goals for his country. Mancini was a starting player at Euro 1988, where Italy reached the semi-finals; during the tournament, he scored a goal in a 1–1 draw against hosts West Germany, in the opening match of the tournament on 10 June. Mancini was also a non-playing member of Azeglio Vicini's Italian squad that finished in third place at the 1990 World Cup on home soil. He was kept out of the side by competition from Gianluca Vialli, Salvatore Schillaci, Andrea Carnevale and Roberto Baggio.

Mancini's international career ended after a dispute with national team coach Arrigo Sacchi, when Mancini was upset because he would not be guaranteed a first team place at the 1994 World Cup. Fierce competition with other creative forwards for places in the starting line-up, such as Gianfranco Zola, Giuseppe Signori, Roberto Baggio and later Francesco Totti and Alessandro Del Piero, hindered his international opportunities, hastening his self-imposed exile from the Italy national team.

== Style of play ==
Often described as a "fantasista" in the Italian sports media, Mancini was a creative and technically gifted forward, who was frequently deployed as a supporting striker alongside a centre-forward, or, on occasion, as an offensive playmaker in the attacking midfield or trequartista position later on in his career. A classic number 10 with creativity and vision, as well as accurate passing and finishing ability, he was capable of assisting many goals as well as scoring them himself, due to his eye for the final pass; he was also known for his excellent technique in the air and anticipation, which enabled him to execute spectacular volleys. As such, he was also capable of operating across the entire front-line, and was even deployed as a centre-forward or out–and–and striker on occasion, due to his movement and intuition, although this was not his favoured position, as he was primarily a generous team player who preferred creating chances for teammates over scoring goals. Under Eriksson, Mancini was also deployed in a free role as a left winger on occasion, in particular during the 1999–2000 season with Lazio, where he was allowed to drift into the centre to support the main striker, and drop deep to help the team defensively.

An elegant, classy, and skilful player, Mancini was also renowned for his flair, ball control, technical ability, and dribbling skills, as well as his change of pace, despite not being as quick as other players in his position; moreover, he was renowned for his tactical intelligence, which he developed over time. He frequently stood out because of this latter attribute, as well as due to his strong character and leadership qualities, which made him an effective captain for his teams. He was often a vocal presence on the football pitch, regularly organising and motivating his teammates, as well as discussing with opponents and arguing with referees. He was also highly regarded for his defensive work-rate off the ball, despite initially being criticised for his defensive contribution by manager Renzo Ulivieri in his early career. Mancini is regarded as one of the best Italian players of his generation, and as one of Italy's greatest ever number 10s. However, despite his ability, he was also occasionally accused of being inconsistent in the media.

== Managerial career ==
=== Fiorentina and Lazio ===
Although Mancini had written a research pamphlet entitled "Il Trequartista", which examined the role of an attacking midfielder, he had not as yet attained the necessary coaching badges to become a manager. He therefore needed special dispensation from the Italian football authorities to take the post at Fiorentina, which was given on 4 March 2001. He was out on loan to Leicester City and returned after four matches to take the Fiorentina job on 26 February 2001. Fiorentina was plagued by financial problems, and Mancini made occasional playing appearances himself. According to various sources, Mancini sometimes worked unpaid and even received death threats after key players such as Rui Costa and Francesco Toldo had to be sold. Despite this, Mancini managed to win the Coppa Italia before quitting on 11 January 2002, after just ten months in the job, with Fiorentina in the relegation zone of Serie A. Fiorentina was ultimately relegated in June 2002.

On 9 May 2002, Mancini was appointed manager of Lazio. He was again restricted by financial considerations, having to sell key players such as Hernán Crespo and Alessandro Nesta, and players were forced to take an 80 per cent pay cut. In his first season with Lazio, however, the club finished 4th in Serie A, earning qualification to the UEFA Champions League, and reached the semi-finals of the UEFA Cup. In 2003–04, Lazio won the Coppa Italia. Lazio finished fourth in 2003 and sixth in 2004. Before the start of the 2004–05 season, rumours circulated in the Italian press that Inter Milan had approached Mancini to fill the recently vacated managerial position at the club. Then, in July 2004, Lazio released Mancini from his contract and he joined Inter.

=== Inter ===
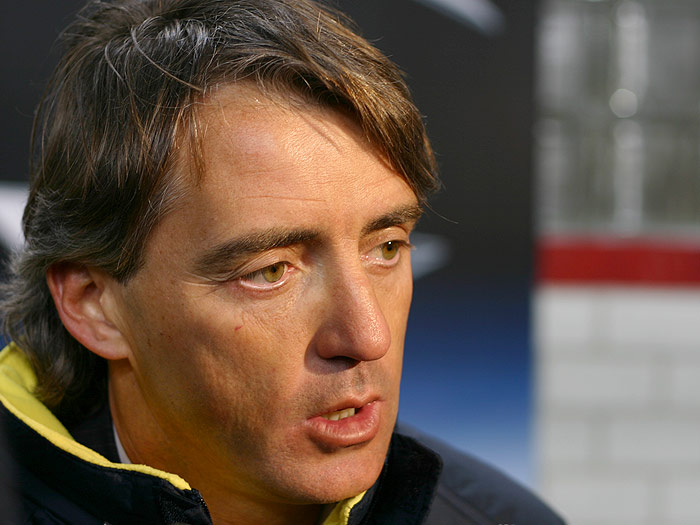
Mancini pictured in 2004 as Inter Milan manager

Mancini took over on 7 July 2004. Under Mancini, Inter Milan soon won the club's first domestic trophy since 1989. Inter Milan became the dominant team in Italy. In Mancini's first season, Inter Milan won the Coppa Italia with a 3–0 victory over Roma at the San Siro. Inter Milan finished third in 2004–05 Serie A and reached the Champions League quarter-finals only to be knocked out by city rivals AC Milan 3–0 on aggregate.

In August 2005, Inter Milan won the 2005 Supercoppa Italiana for the second time in their history with a 1–0 victory over Juventus. In 2006, Inter Milan again won the Coppa Italia and Italian Super Cup. Following the Calciopoli scandal, Juventus was stripped of the scudetto title, which was handed to Inter Milan. Inter Milan achieved a record-breaking run of 17 consecutive victories in Serie A, starting on 25 September 2006, with a 4–1 home win over Livorno and ending on 28 February 2007 after a 1–1 draw at home to Udinese. The run lasted for almost five months and is among the best in European league football history. Inter Milan won a second successive league title with five games to spare and only losing one league game all season. Inter Milan finished with a record-breaking 97 points.

Mancini became the third coach in the history of Inter Milan to win back-to-back league titles after Alfredo Foni (1952–53 and 1953–54) and Helenio Herrera (1964–65 and 1965–66). Inter Milan also progressed to the Coppa Italia and Italian Super Cup for the third consecutive season but was beaten in both finals by Roma. Inter Milan struggled in the Champions League, where they were knocked out in the first knockout round by Valencia. At the end of the game, there was a mass brawl involving both sets of players. Mancini was not involved in the incident, but camera footage showed him attempting to block a camera's view before he was seen shrugging his shoulders and walking away. His reputation continued to grow as he added a third consecutive Serie A title to his honours. Mancini guided Inter Milan to another Coppa Italia final but lost for a second consecutive season to Roma, 2–1, at the Stadio Olimpico.

Despite his successes, the inability to make any real progress in the Champions League displeased Inter Milan owner Massimo Moratti. Inter Milan was knocked out in the first knockout round of the Champions League by Liverpool. The first leg took place at Anfield, with defender Marco Materazzi being sent off in the 30th minute. Inter Milan almost held out for a draw, but two late goals in the 85th and 90th minutes by Liverpool damaged Inter's hopes of progressing. The return leg was at the San Siro, but again Mancini was not helped by the ill discipline of his players, with Nicolás Burdisso being sent off in the 50th minute before Fernando Torres scored for Liverpool in the 64th minute to seal the tie 3–0 on aggregate. After being eliminated by Liverpool, Mancini wanted to leave after the season, but changed his mind the following day.

In March 2008, amid rumours that he was to be dismissed and replaced by Chelsea manager José Mourinho at the end of the season, Mancini announced his intention to step down at the end of the 2007–08 season. He rescinded this decision a day later after meeting with Moratti. On 29 May 2008, Inter Milan officially announced the sacking of Mancini. Moratti justified the dismissal by pointing to Mancini's comments after the Liverpool defeat. He was replaced by Mourinho.

=== Out of football ===
Mancini was linked to the vacant Chelsea manager's position in May 2008 and then the same role at Notts County. On 30 October 2009, Mancini won compensation for his dismissal by Inter. The contract settlement meant Mancini was actually unemployable by any other club from May 2008 to October 2009. It was rumoured that Mancini was entitled to a €16 million pay-off, but in the end, he reportedly settled for €5 million.

=== Manchester City ===
==== 2009–10: First season ====
On 19 December 2009, Mancini was publicly revealed to be taking over as manager of Manchester City on a three-and-a-half-year deal following the sacking of Mark Hughes. With wealthy Emirati owners who were willing to invest heavily in the team, Manchester City had become a club expectant of success. Having been appointed halfway through the season, Mancini's arrival had an immediate impact on City's form, with four consecutive wins.

Mancini won his first Manchester Derby over Manchester United 2–1 in a League Cup semi-final first leg. United won the second-leg 3–1, however, and eliminated City from the competition. In April, City moved into fourth place in the Premier League. On 5 May, however, a single goal defeat at home to Tottenham Hotspur meant that City missed out on a Champions League spot. City finished the season in fifth place, their highest Premier League finish. There had been speculation that Mancini might lose his job if City failed to secure Champions League football, but chairman Khaldoon Al Mubarak gave his support to Mancini.

==== 2010–11: FA Cup win ====
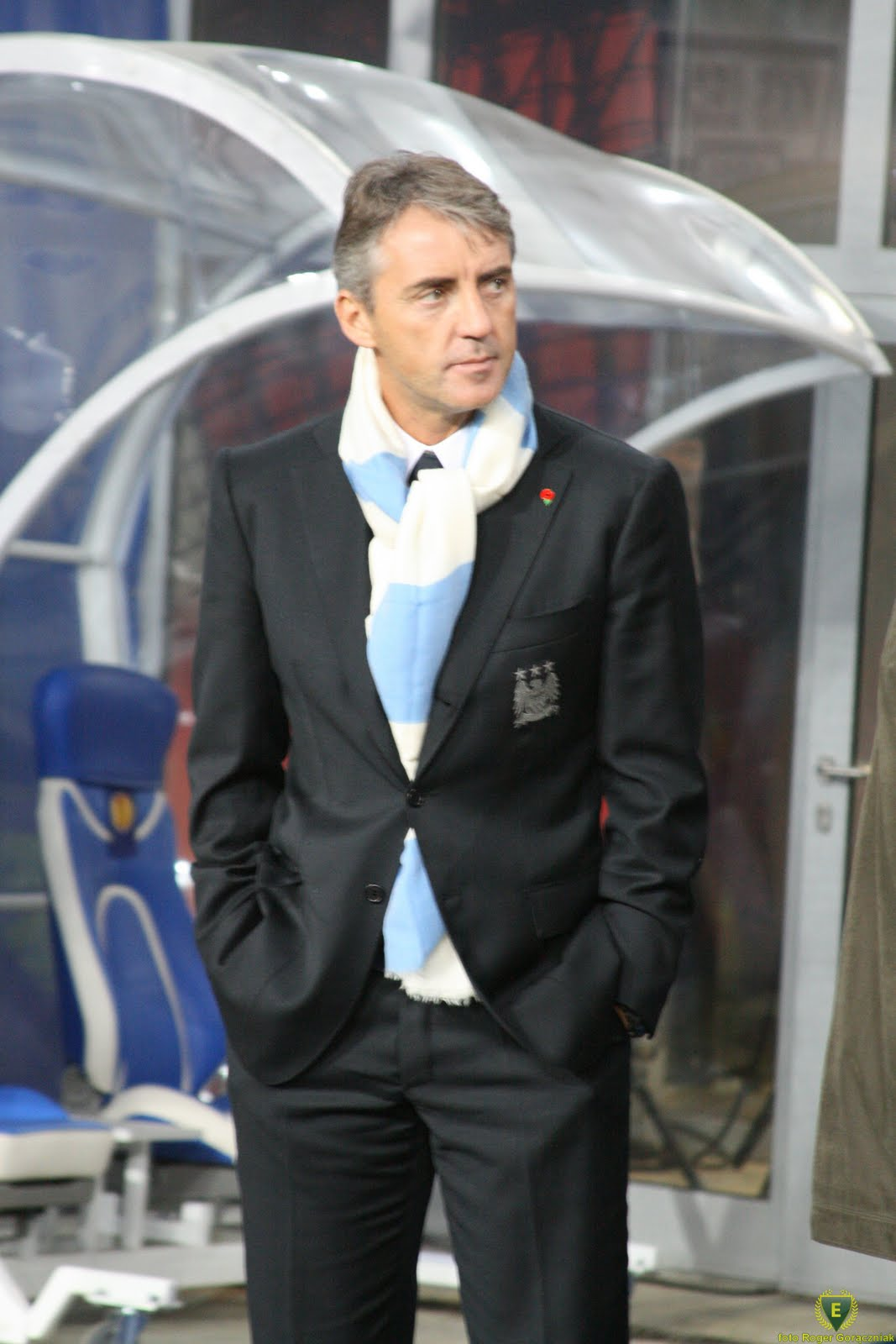
Mancini as Manchester City manager in 2010

Mancini spent heavily during the summer transfer window. He signed German international defender Jérôme Boateng from Hamburger SV for approximately £10.64 million, Spanish World Cup winner David Silva from Valencia for approximately £24 million, Yaya Touré from Barcelona for around £24 million and Aleksandar Kolarov from Lazio for approximately £16 million. The 2010–11 Premier League season was marked by runs of mixed form. With a 2–0 win away at Wigan Athletic on 19 September 2010, City moved into fourth position in the league and did not drop out of the top four positions during the rest of the season. In October and November, the team struggled for form, which put some pressure on Mancini, with his tactics widely criticised following two consecutive 0–0 home draws with Manchester United and Birmingham City.

A fine run of form in the weeks running up to Christmas, however, meant City occupied first place in the Premier League twice over the Christmas period. In the ten games before 15 January 2011, City won seven times, drew twice and lost only once as they moved into title contention, while also securing passage into the Round of 32 of the Europa League by finishing as the top team in Group A. As a result of his team's strong league form, Mancini was awarded the Premier League Manager of the Month award for December.

City's Premier League form tailed off again in the new year, with City jointly contesting the FA Cup and Europa League, and Mancini cited burnout for losing ground in the league title race. City was eventually eliminated from the Europa League by Ukrainian side Dynamo Kyiv in March, but his team replied strongly by winning eight out of the next ten matches, including an FA Cup semi-final victory at Wembley over local rivals Manchester United in April.

A win over Tottenham in May guaranteed City the opportunity to play Champions League football the following season. This win was followed by City winning the FA Cup with a 1–0 victory over Stoke City in the following weekend's final at Wembley. This FA Cup triumph meant that Mancini joined five other City managers who had won major honours, and it ended the club's longest trophy drought in its history. Due to their late run of form, City finished third in the league ahead of Arsenal after a 2–0 win over Bolton Wanderers on the last day of the season, thereby avoiding the need to participate in play-off round fixtures in order to progress to the group stages of the following season's Champions League competition. Only goal difference separated City from achieving a second-place finish over Chelsea.

==== 2011–12: Premier League Champion ====
The club was quieter in the closed season transfer window than in previous years, with the club's spending of approximately £75 million more in line with the corresponding amounts spent by rivals Manchester United and Liverpool. £60 million of this sum was used to purchase two players: Sergio Agüero, for a club record fee, and Samir Nasri from Atlético Madrid and Arsenal, respectively. Other players purchased during the summer included Gaël Clichy and Stefan Savić, while Owen Hargreaves joined on a free transfer after having been released by Manchester United. City began the Premier League season very strongly, winning 12 of their first 14 matches and scoring an impressive 48 goals while only conceding 13. These results left City undefeated and five points clear at the top of the league over second-placed Manchester United by the beginning of December.

A revitalised Edin Džeko won the Premier League Player of the Month award for August 2011, and David Silva won the same award for September 2011. Many were impressed with the impact of Agüero and Nasri, who had given City an exciting, attacking verve. Mancini was also responsible for inflicting United's worst loss since 1955 when his City side won 6–1 away at Old Trafford. He was named Premier League Manager of the Month as a result of City's strong form in the month of October. City maintained the lead in the Premier League over the next five months but struggled in the Champions League in a group that involved Bayern Munich, Napoli and Villarreal. City failed to progress, but finished third in the group with ten points, normally enough to guarantee qualification into the knock-out stages.

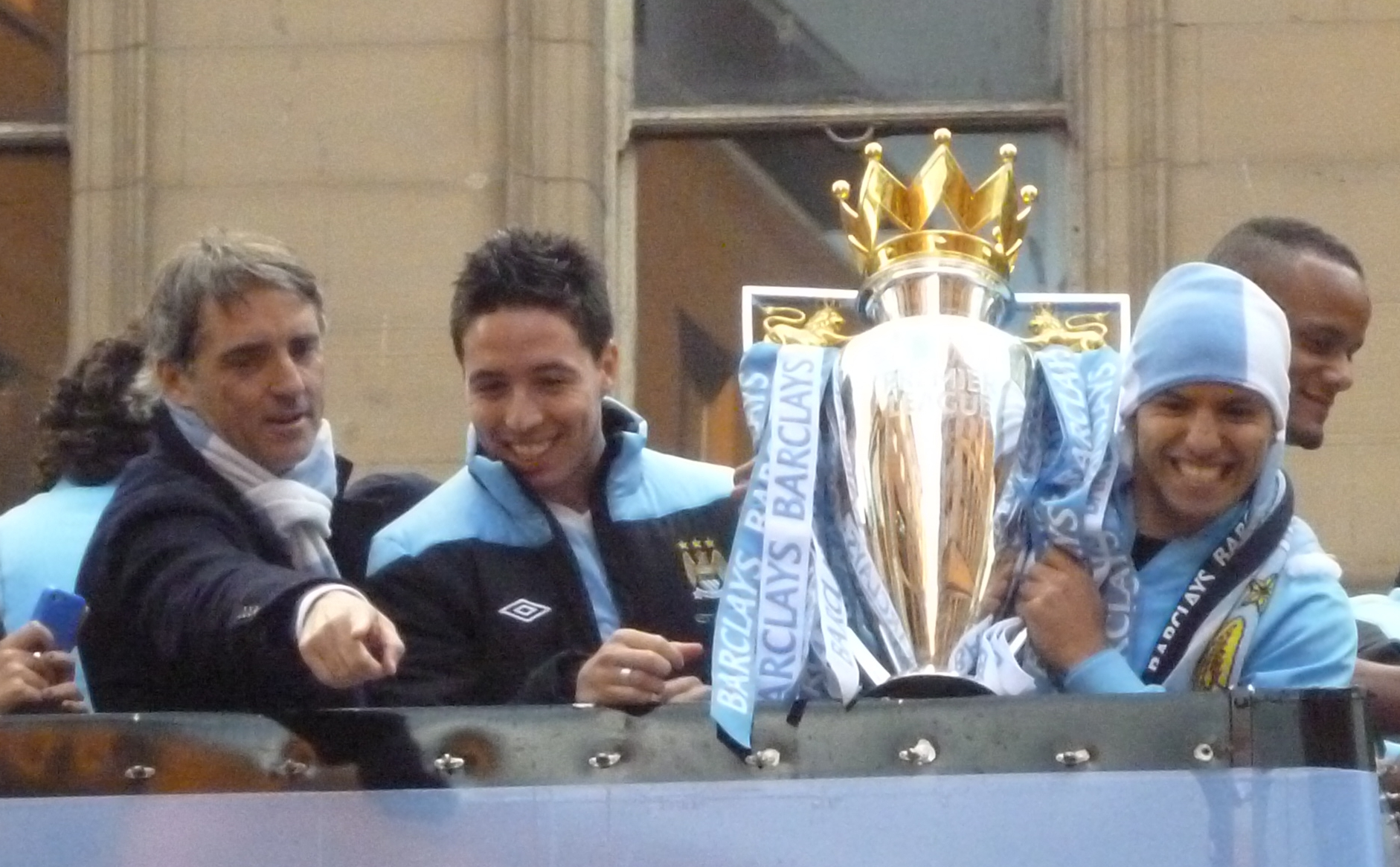
Mancini (left), Samir Nasri and Sergio Agüero with the Premier League trophy during Manchester City's victory parade, May 2012

A 3–2 loss to Manchester United in the FA Cup third round on 8 January 2012 was bittersweet. City had Vincent Kompany controversially sent off in the sixth minute, and United managed to create a 3–0 lead before half-time against a lacklustre and beleaguered City team. However, after numerous tactical changes from Mancini at half-time, City came out fighting with ten men, a renewed version of the team that had played in the first half. Two goals from Aleksandar Kolarov and Sergio Agüero narrowed the deficit to just one goal. City was in the ascendancy and continued to push for an equalising goal despite having only ten men, but failed to do so with the final whistle. Mancini later believed the match was a seminal moment in the development of his team, demonstrating that City was a better team than United. He believed that the match helped to carve out a fighting spirit that his team had previously lacked.

City also progressed to the League Cup semi-final, maintaining Mancini's record of reaching a major competition semi-final in every season he has managed. City played Liverpool and conceded an away goal in the first leg with a penalty from Steven Gerrard. City went to Anfield and led twice with goals from Nigel de Jong and Edin Džeko, but another penalty from Steven Gerrard and a goal from Craig Bellamy meant Liverpool won 3–2 on aggregate. On 13 May 2012, City clinched the Premier League title in a 3-2 comeback win over Queens Park Rangers after originally being 2–1 down going into injury time. He became the second Italian manager to win a Premier League title after Carlo Ancelotti's Chelsea team in 2009–10.

==== 2012–13: Final season in Manchester ====
Mancini stated during pre-season that Manchester City's long-term aim was to win the Champions League. Mancini declared that he envisaged less transfer activity in the summer, and was content with his attacking strikers. On 9 July 2012, City announced that Roberto Mancini had signed a new five-year deal, meaning that he was contracted with the club until summer 2017. City began the new season by participating in, and winning, the 2012 FA Community Shield against 2012 FA Cup winners Chelsea on 12 August 2012 at Villa Park. Manchester City won 3–2 on this occasion. On 21 November 2012, a 1–1 draw at home to Real Madrid saw Manchester City and Mancini exit the Champions League at the group stage for the second successive season.

At the end of the calendar year of 2012, Manchester City was second in the Premier League, seven points behind rivals Manchester United. In contrast to the 2011–12 league season, Mancini's team struggled to score sufficient goals and suffered some poor results in the second half of the season, such as a 3–1 loss to Southampton on 9 February 2013 (which Mancini described as the worst performance during his time in charge at City) and a 2–0 loss to Everton on 16 March. City's poor form led to United capturing the Premier League title on 22 April with a 3–0 win over Aston Villa with four games to spare. On 11 May, Manchester City lost to Wigan Athletic 1–0 in the 2013 FA Cup Final, with a late goal from Wigan's Ben Watson.

On 14 May, Mancini was dismissed as manager of Manchester City two days after City's loss to Wigan in the FA Cup Final. Speculation over Mancini's future had mounted for months beforehand; a question regarding then-Málaga manager Manuel Pellegrini possibly taking Mancini's job in February 2013 provoked an expletive response from Mancini during a press conference. Mancini's public criticism of backroom and playing staff, as well as his distant relationships, alienated the players and the club hierarchy during the last eight months of his tenure. On sacking Mancini, the club cited the need for a more "holistic" approach for the long-term future of the club, namely a manager passionate for developing players at youth level to create a "one house football club," as City looked to open their new £100 million youth academy at the Etihad Campus in 2014. With Manchester City, Mancini achieved the fourth-best win percentage in Premier League history, behind only José Mourinho, Alex Ferguson and Carlo Ancelotti.

A week after his dismissal, Mancini took out a full page advert in the Manchester Evening News to say farewell and thank the club's fans – an act that was reciprocated in the Gazzetta dello Sport by Manchester City supporters.

=== Galatasaray ===
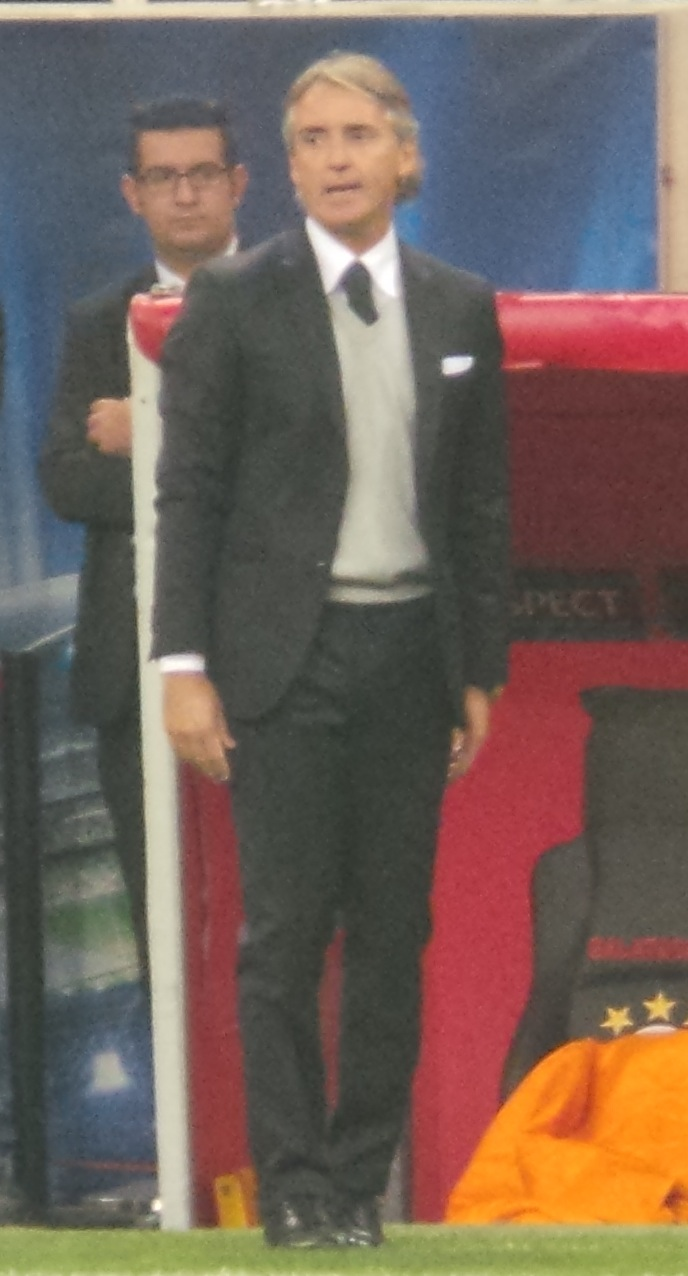
Mancini managing Galatasaray in 2013

On 30 September 2013, Mancini signed a three-year contract with Turkish side Galatasaray, taking over from the previous coach Fatih Terim, who had left to take over as coach of the Turkey national team. In his first game in charge, on 2 October against Juventus in the 2013–14 Champions League, Galatasaray drew 2–2 with a late equaliser. After a convincing 3–1 victory at home against Copenhagen in the same competition, his Galatasaray side this time defeated reigning Italian champions Juventus 1–0 on the crucial matchday six to advance to the last 16 of the tournament, a feat he was unable to achieve with Manchester City over two seasons. Galatasaray met Chelsea and was eliminated despite drawing the home leg 1–1.

Under Mancini, Galatasaray won their first 12 2013–14 Süper Lig home matches, including a 6–0 victory over Bursaspor, the highest winning margin in the league as of game week 20. On 7 May, Galatasaray won 1–0 against Eskişehirspor in the 2014 Turkish Cup Final with a late goal from Wesley Sneijder. On 11 June, Mancini left the club by mutual consent. It was reported by the club's chairman and the spokesperson that the club's transfer policy and the overall budget of the upcoming season were the reasons behind the dispute. This was also verified by Mancini, who stated: "When I accepted the coaching post, Gala's aims were different."

=== Return to Inter Milan ===
On 14 November 2014, Mancini agreed to a surprise return at his previous club Inter Milan, replacing Walter Mazzarri at the helm of the Nerazzurri. His first game in charge was against rivals AC Milan in the Derby della Madonnina, which finished in a 1–1 draw, with the club's goal scored by Joel Obi. On 27 November 2014, Mancini's 50th birthday, Inter played the first European match of his second spell, a 2–1 home win over Dnipro Dnipropetrovsk to confirm that Inter would top the group with a game remaining.

After Inter Milan lost 3–0 in a Serie A derby against AC Milan on 31 January 2016, a fuming Mancini insulted the referees and showed his middle finger to some Rossoneri fans who were swearing at him. He was consequently banned for the following match. Mancini was also awarded a Tapiro d'Oro by the TV broadcast Striscia la notizia for his bad behaviour. During the post-match interviews of the same game, he blamed journalist Mikaela Calcagno for asking silly questions ("Questa è una stronzata, dai, su", Italian for "This is crap, come on") and creating controversy ("Se mi deve fare domande per far polemica, la facciamo", Italian for "If you need to ask me questions to create controversy, let's do it"). Later, he apologised for those expressions, sending flowers to Calcagno.

On 8 August 2016, Mancini left Inter on a mutual agreement.

=== Zenit Saint Petersburg ===
On 1 June 2017, Mancini was appointed as a manager of Zenit Saint Petersburg. On 13 May 2018, Mancini terminated his contract by mutual consent.

=== Italy national team ===
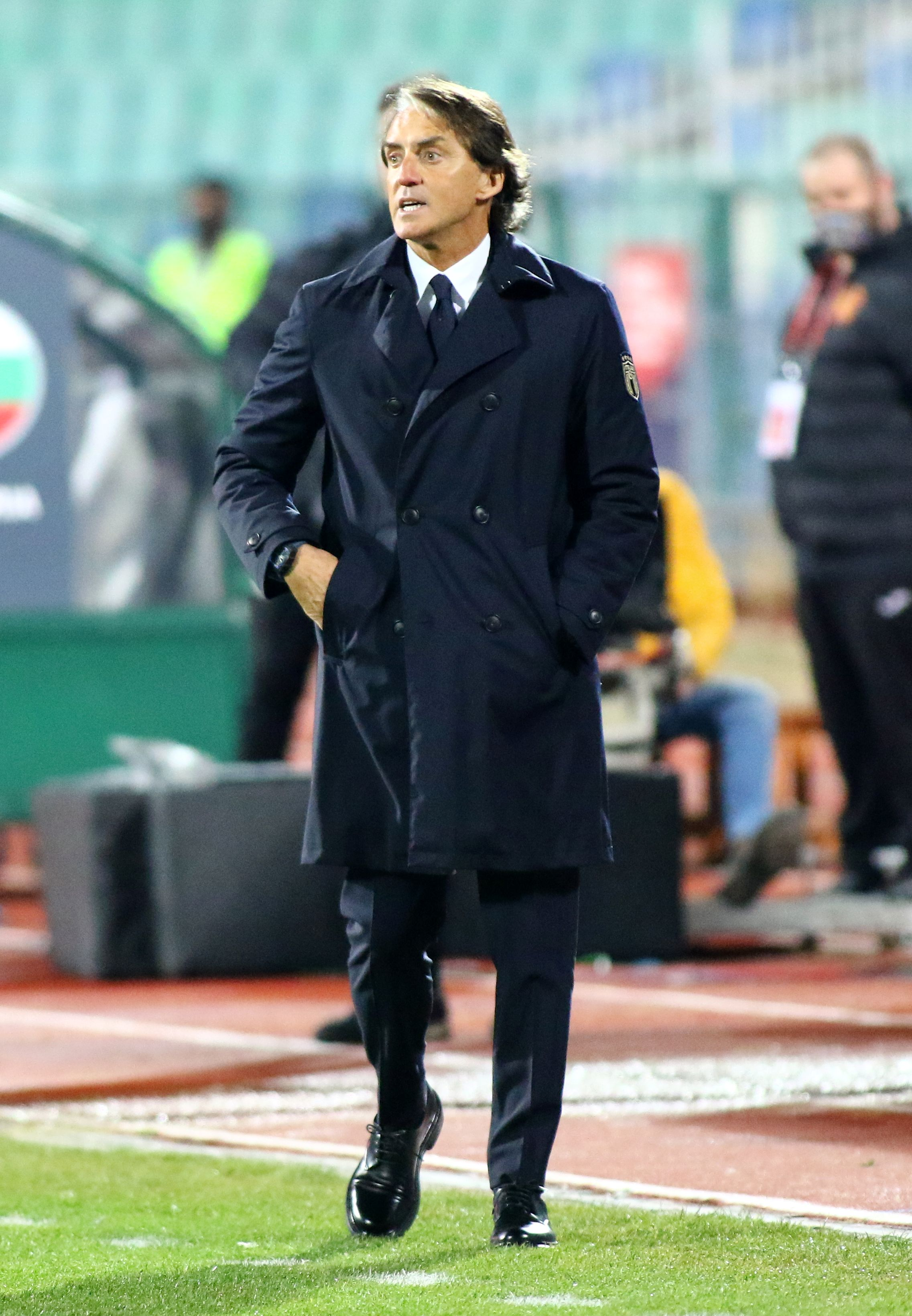
Mancini managing the Italy national team in 2021

Mancini succeeded caretaker Luigi Di Biagio on 14 May 2018 as manager of the Italy national team. He signed an incentive-based contract, which would run until 2020, extended automatically to 2022 if Italy was to qualify for Euro 2020. Italy had failed to qualify for the 2018 FIFA World Cup under Gian Piero Ventura after a play-off defeat six months earlier, the first time they missed the World Cup since the 1958 FIFA World Cup and a major tournament since UEFA Euro 1992.

Mancini shaped the national team differently. Three of his assistants, Alberico Evani, Attilio Lombardo and Fausto Salsano, played successfully with him at Sampdoria in the 1990s, as well as Gianluca Vialli. Vialli joined as head of delegation in October 2019 after fighting pancreatic cancer. Mancini's team did not include only players from the big teams based in Milan, Rome or Turin. Out of the 26 players, nobody grew up the big metropolises. Half of them came from villages with fewer than 10,000 inhabitants: 10 from the north of Italy, 7 from the middle, and 9 from the south.

On 28 May 2018, Mancini coached his first match for Italy, a 2–1 victory in a friendly over Saudi Arabia. On 12 October 2019, Italy qualified for Euro 2020 with three matches to spare after a 2–0 home win over Greece. On 15 October, with a 5–0 away win over Liechtenstein, Italy won its ninth consecutive match under Mancini, equalling the record set by Vittorio Pozzo between 1938 and 1939. Italy won all of their Euro 2020 qualifying matches in Group J, and set an unprecedented record of 10 victories in a single calendar year in 2019. In May 2021, Mancini's contract with the Italy national team was extended until June 2026.

In June 2021, Italy was the only team in UEFA Euro 2020 to win all three group stage matches without conceding a goal; Italy had the best goal difference, the most shots, and the most attempted through-balls at the tournament. On 26 June 2021, with a 2–1 win over Austria, Mancini led Italy to a record 31-match unbeaten streak, surpassing the 30-match streak set by Pozzo. On 11 July, Mancini led Italy to a 3–2 victory on penalties over England in the final of the tournament at Wembley, following a 1–1 draw after extra-time; this was Italy's second European Championship title after 1968. On 5 September 2021, Mancini led Italy to their 36th unbeaten match, surpassing the world record of 35 set by Brazil and Spain. The unbeaten run was extended to 37 matches three days later with a 5–0 home win over Lithuania, but the streak was ended the following month with a 2–1 home loss to Spain in the 2020–21 UEFA Nations League A semi-finals. On 10 October, Italy went on to win the 2020–21 UEFA Nations League bronze medal following a 2–1 home victory over Belgium. Mancini placed second in the 2021 Best FIFA Men's Coach award, behind winner Thomas Tuchel.

On 24 March 2022, Italy lost 1–0 at home to North Macedonia during the semi-finals of the 2022 World Cup qualification play-offs, failing to qualify for the 2022 FIFA World Cup, missing out on the tournament for the second consecutive time in their history. On 1 June, Italy were defeated 3–0 at Wembley Stadium by reigning Copa América champions Argentina in the 2022 Finalissima.

On 12 August 2023, Mancini resigned as manager of the national team.

=== Saudi Arabia national team ===
Mancini was appointed as head coach of the Saudi Arabia national team on 27 August 2023 on a contract running to 2027, and managed the Green Falcons through the 2023 AFC Asian Cup knockout stage, where they lost to South Korea 4–2 on penalties in the round of 16.

During the Saudi Arabia match against South Korea in the 2023 AFC Asian Cup Round of 16 as the match went to a penalty shootout, Mancini was seen walking down the tunnel after Abdulrahman Ghareeb missed the second penalty for Saudi Arabia. Mancini turned and headed to the changing room without watching Hwang Hee-Chan convert the decisive kick that saw Saudi Arabia lose 2–4 on penalties. He would later apologize in the post-match conference: "I apologise [for leaving early], I thought it was finished. I didn't want to disrespect anyone," and "I want to say thank you to all my players for what they did. They are improving a lot."

On 24 October 2024, Mancini reached a joint agreement with the Saudi Arabian Football Federation to end his contract as national team manager, following disappointing results during the 2026 FIFA World Cup qualification after draws against low-ranked sides Bahrain and Indonesia.

=== Al-Sadd ===
On 13 November 2025, Mancini signed a two-year contract with Qatar Stars League side Al-Sadd. On 24 January 2026, Mancini's Al-Sadd won the UAE-Qatar Super Shield after defeating Shabab Al Ahli 3–2. Al-Sadd knocked out Al-Hilal 3–3 (2–4 p) in the AFC Champions League Elite round of 16 on after an impressive display from them. He lost against Vissel Kobe 3–3 (4–5 p) at the Quarterfinals. He won the league on 27 April 2026, after defeating Al-Shamal on the final matchday, completing a remarkable turnaround for Al-Sadd, who had been struggling in sixth place before he took charge. Mancini reached the Amir of Qatar Cup final. However, he lost the final 4–1 to Al-Gharafa. Mancini left the club by mutual agreement on 13 June 2026.

=== Return to Italy national team ===
On 28 July 2026, FIGC president Giovanni Malagò announced that Mancini would return as head coach of the Italy national team.

== Management style ==
Despite having been a support striker during his playing career, Mancini places great emphasis on building from the back, stressing the importance of not conceding a goal means the team will always have an opportunity to win, going as far as to say: "I like 1–0 wins. When you don't concede a goal and you have players like Edin Džeko, Carlos Tevez or David Silva, you win 90%. I prefer we are boring for two to three matches and we win 1–0. If you watch teams that won titles, they conceded very few goals." Despite this, some argue Mancini is more of a "defence first" manager rather than a "win first" manager, a style that has been criticised by some in the British media. Others accepted that his pragmatic and cautious approach was what the team lacked, and that Mancini's style would ensure City could challenge for trophies regularly.

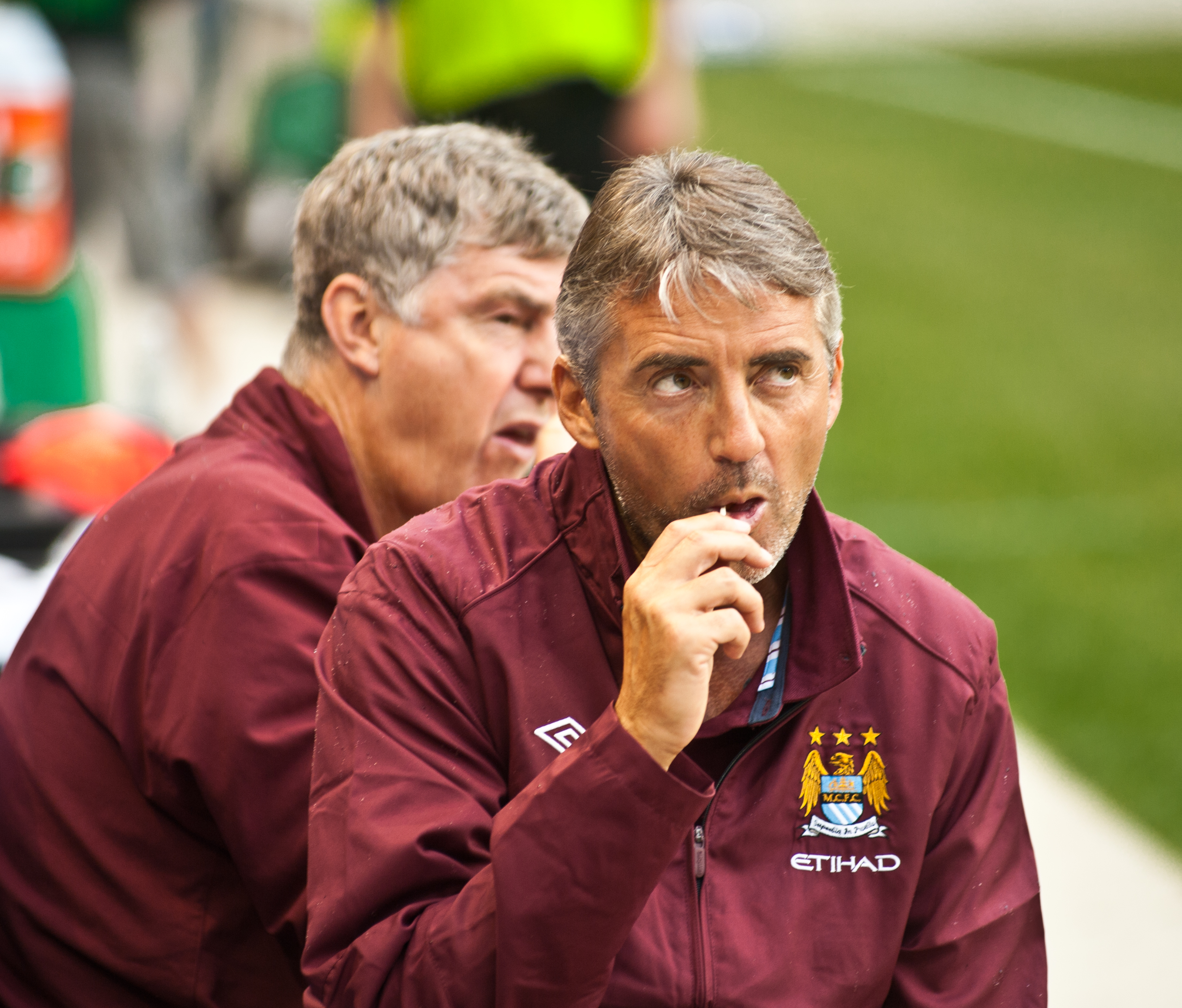
Mancini in 2010

At Manchester City, Mancini had inherited a team from Mark Hughes, which, while showing great prolificity and potential in front of goal, had an insecure defence. Intensively coaching his defence enabled him to get his tenure at City off to a positive start. In Inter's 2007–08 Serie A-winning season, Inter Milan conceded the fewest goals in the league with 26, 11 fewer than Juventus and Roma, and at City, his team gradually garnered a reputation as being well organised defensively and tough to break down. In Mancini's first full season in charge at City, they conceded 33 goals in the Premier League, the fewest along with Chelsea and 18 clean sheets, the highest in the 2010–11 Premier League season.

Mancini's training methods have been criticised by some City players, especially by ex-Manchester City fitness coach Raymond Verheijen, who is a personal fitness coach for Craig Bellamy. During his time at City, Mancini tried to stamp his authority with rebellious players who were not performing well and stated: "If a top player is not happy then it's better to go."

Mancini is known to use the media to alleviate the pressure from his players. Following City's defeat to Arsenal in the 2011–12 season, a deficit of eight points had been established between rivals Manchester United with only six matches left to play. After the Arsenal match, he believed the deficit was catchable. City, however, won the next match convincingly against West Bromwich Albion 4–0, but from then on Mancini maintained in post-match interviews that the title race was over. City won the next three matches, meaning a win against Manchester United would put them top of the league on goal difference. City beat United 1–0, with Mancini conceding the title race was back on but that United was the favourite with two matches to play. Mancini's unorthodox approach worked, and City won the league on goal difference with 89 points after six consecutive league wins in the final six matches. Mancini's players believed his approach alleviated pressure and helped City to win the last six league matches, which won the title on goal difference. Mancini stated afterwards that he always believed personally that City could win the title, but wanted his players to prove they could despite his public statements suggesting otherwise.

In 2015, Italy coach Antonio Conte called up Brazilian-born Éder and Argentine-born Franco Vázquez, both of which hold Italian citizenship as their lineage is Italian, allowing them to be eligible to play for Italy. Speaking at a Serie A meeting on 23 March 2015, Mancini said: "The Italian national team should be Italian. An Italian player deserves to play for the national team while someone who wasn't born in Italy, even if they have relatives, I don't think they deserve to". To the use of foreign-born players, Conte responded: "If Mauro Camoranesi [who was born in Argentina] was allowed to help Italy win the 2006 World Cup, then why can't Éder and Franco Vázquez lead the Azzurri to glory in next year's European Championship?"

During the period in which he has coached the Italy national team, Mancini has often used a 4–3–3 formation, and has instead developed a reputation for creating a "winning machine" while also playing more attractive, offensive–minded football with a greater emphasis on possession. The team scored a record thirty-seven goals in the Euro 2020 qualifying matches, winning all ten of their games. They subsequently scored three goals without conceding against Turkey in the opening game of Euro 2020, the first time they had ever scored three goals in a European Championship match; they also replicated this scoreline in the following group match victory against Switzerland. The team went on to score 13 goals in total during the final tournament (a record for Italy at a major tournament) en route to winning the title undefeated. He has also been known for giving opportunities to young players, with Nicolò Zaniolo and Sandro Tonali given call-ups to the national team even before making their debuts in Serie A. Promising young players like Nicolò Barella, Federico Chiesa and Moise Kean were also called up under him. Mancini built on the work of Maurizio Viscidi at youth level and Maurizio Sarri, Roberto De Zerbi and Gian Piero Gasperini in Serie A, using fluid passing in possession – built around the gameplay of the midfield trio of Marco Verratti, Jorginho and Nicolò Barella – and energetic pressing and counterpressing out of possession.

== Personal life ==
Mancini is married to Federica Morelli, although reports in 2015 had stated they had been in the process of separating. The couple have two sons and a daughter, Filippo, Andrea and Camilla, who have played in the Inter Milan Youth Sector ranks, where Filippo has played ten minutes in a Coppa Italia match. Filippo and Andrea have at one point been a part of Manchester City's under-21 youth team. Filippo trained with the club's youth/reserve team for several months during the 2007–08 season before Roberto was appointed as City's manager, while Andrea was signed by his father for the Elite Development Squad in November 2010 after being released from Bologna. Andrea was released at the end of the 2011–12 season.

Mancini was estimated to have a personal wealth of £19 million in 2011. He joked in 2010 about watching the soap opera Coronation Street to help improve his English. Mancini has maintained a tradition of wearing a scarf of his club's colours.

== Career statistics ==
=== Club ===
Appearances and goals by club, season and competition
Club	Season	League			National Cup (Note: Includes the Supercoppa Italiana.)		Continental (Note: Includes the UEFA Champions League, UEFA Cup, and UEFA Cup Winners' Cup.)		Total	
Club	Season	Division	Apps	Goals	Apps	Goals	Apps	Goals	Apps	Goals
Bologna	1981–82	Serie A	30	9	1	0	—		31	9
Sampdoria	1982–83	Serie A	22	4	5	1	—		27	5
Sampdoria	1983–84	Serie A	30	8	8	2	—		38	10
Sampdoria	1984–85	Serie A	24	3	11	3	—		35	6
Sampdoria	1985–86	Serie A	23	6	11	4	4	2	38	12
Sampdoria	1986–87	Serie A	26	6	5	0	—		31	6
Sampdoria	1987–88	Serie A	30	5	13	3	—		43	8
Sampdoria	1988–89	Serie A	29	9	11	5	8	0	48	14
Sampdoria	1989–90	Serie A	31	11	4	2	9	2	44	15
Sampdoria	1990–91	Serie A	30	12	10	2	7	2	47	16
Sampdoria	1991–92	Serie A	29	6	7	3	9	4	45	13
Sampdoria	1992–93	Serie A	30	15	2	0	—		32	15
Sampdoria	1993–94	Serie A	30	12	7	0	—		37	12
Sampdoria	1994–95	Serie A	31	9	3	1	4	2	38	12
Sampdoria	1995–96	Serie A	26	11	2	1	—		28	12
Sampdoria	1996–97	Serie A	33	15	2	0	—		35	15
Sampdoria	Total		424	132	101	27	19	12	566	168
Lazio	1997–98	Serie A	34	5	8	1	10	3	52	9
Lazio	1998–99	Serie A	33	10	7	2	7	0	47	12
Lazio	1999–2000	Serie A	20	0	7	3	10	0	37	3
Lazio	Total		87	15	22	6	27	3	136	24
Leicester City (loan)	2000–01	Premier League	4	0	1	0	—		5	0
Career total			545	156	125	33	46	15	738	201

=== International ===
Appearances and goals by national team and year
National team	Year	Apps	Goals
Italy	1984	2	0
Italy	1986	1	0
Italy	1987	6	0
Italy	1988	9	1
Italy	1989	1	0
Italy	1990	3	0
Italy	1991	6	0
Italy	1992	1	0
Italy	1993	6	3
Italy	1994	1	0
Total		36	4

Scores and results list Italy's goal tally first, score column indicates score after each Mancini goal.

List of international goals scored by Roberto Mancini
No.	Date	Venue	Opponent	Score	Result	Competition
1	10 June 1988	Rheinstadion, Düsseldorf, West Germany	Germany	1–0	1–1	UEFA Euro 1988
2	24 March 1993	Stadio Renzo Barbera, Palermo, Italy	Malta	4–0	6–1	1994 FIFA World Cup qualification
3	24 March 1993	Stadio Renzo Barbera, Palermo, Italy	Malta	6–1	6–1	1994 FIFA World Cup qualification
4	22 September 1993	Kadrioru Stadium, Tallinn, Estonia	Estonia	2–0	3–0	1994 FIFA World Cup qualification

== Managerial statistics ==
As of 15 November 2026

Managerial record by team and tenure
Team	Nat.	From	To	Record								Ref.
Team	Nat.	From	To	G	W	D	L	GF	GA	GD	Win %	Ref.
Fiorentina	(Italy)	26 February 2001	14 January 2002	43	12	9	22	49	74	−25	27.91	
Lazio	(Italy)	9 May 2002	14 June 2004	102	49	32	21	160	102	+58	48.04	
Inter Milan	(Italy)	7 July 2004	29 May 2008	226	140	60	26	404	189	+215	61.95	
Manchester City	(England)	19 December 2009	13 May 2013	191	113	38	40	361	176	+185	59.16	
Galatasaray	(Turkey)	30 September 2013	11 June 2014	46	24	13	9	82	47	+35	52.17	
Inter Milan	(Italy)	14 November 2014	8 August 2016	77	36	18	23	110	85	+25	46.75	
Zenit Saint Petersburg	(Russia)	1 June 2017	13 May 2018	45	22	13	10	74	35	+39	48.89	
Italy	(Italy)	15 May 2018	12 August 2023	61	37	15	9	123	45	+78	60.66	
Saudi Arabia	(Saudi Arabia)	27 August 2023	24 October 2024	21	9	7	5	27	17	+10	42.86	
Al-Sadd	(Qatar)	13 November 2025	13 June 2026	29	17	4	8	75	59	+16	58.62	
Italy	(Italy)	28 July 2026	Present	6	3	1	2	12	10	+2	50.00	
Career Total				848	463	210	175	1,479	840	+639	54.60	

== Honours ==
=== Player ===
Sampdoria

- Serie A: 1990–91
- Coppa Italia: 1984–85, 1987–88, 1988–89, 1993–94
- Supercoppa Italiana: 1991
- European Cup Winners' Cup: 1989–90
- European Cup runner-up: 1991–92

Lazio

- Serie A: 1999–2000
- Coppa Italia: 1997–98, 1999–2000
- Supercoppa Italiana: 1998
- UEFA Cup Winners' Cup: 1998–99
- UEFA Super Cup: 1999

Italy

- FIFA World Cup third place: 1990
- UEFA European Championship third place: 1988
- Scania 100 Tournament: 1991

Individual

- Guerin d'Oro: 1987–88, 1990–91
- Serie A Footballer of the Year: 1996–97
- Serie A Italian Footballer of the Year: 1996–97
- Golden Foot: 2017, as football legend

=== Manager ===
Fiorentina

- Coppa Italia: 2000–01

Lazio

- Coppa Italia: 2003–04

Inter Milan

- Serie A: 2005–06, 2006–07, 2007–08
- Coppa Italia: 2004–05, 2005–06; runner-up: 2006–07, 2007–08
- Supercoppa Italiana: 2005, 2006

Manchester City

- Premier League: 2011–12
- FA Cup: 2010–11; runner-up: 2012–13
- FA Community Shield: 2012

Galatasaray

- Turkish Cup: 2013–14

Al-Sadd

- UAE-Qatar Super Shield: 2026
- Qatar Stars League: 2025–26
- Amir of Qatar Cup runner-up: 2026

Italy

- UEFA European Championship: 2020
- UEFA Nations League third place: 2020–21, 2022–23

Individual

- Panchina d'Oro: 2007–08
- Premier League Manager of the Month: December 2010, October 2011
- Italian Football Hall of Fame: 2015
- Enzo Bearzot Award: 2019
- Italian Sportsman of the Year: 2019
- IFFHS World's Best National Coach: 2021
- Globe Soccer Best Coach of the Year: 2021
- World Soccer Men's Manager of the Year 2021

=== Orders ===
- 5th Class / Knight: Cavaliere Ordine al Merito della Repubblica Italiana: 1991
- 2nd Class / Grand Officer: Grande Ufficiale Ordine al Merito della Repubblica Italiana: 2021

== See also ==
- List of FA Cup winning managers
