= Stefan Nenadović =

Montenegrin footballer (born 1991)

Personal information
- Date of birth: 4 January 1991 (age 35)
- Place of birth: Titograd, Yugoslavia
- Height: 1.81 m (5 ft 11 1/2 in)
- Positions: Attacking midfielder; forward

Team information
- Current team: Vertovese

Youth career
- 2005–2007: Internazionale
- 2007–2010: Monza

Senior career*
Years	Team	Apps	(Gls)
2009–2010	Monza	1	(0)
2010–2013	OFK Bar	0	(0)
2015	Pro Lissone		(1)
2016	Brugherio Calcio		(7)
2016	Lissone		(8)
2017	Trevigliese	16	(5)
2017–2018	Brianza		(4)
2018	Altabrianza Tavernerio		(1)
2019	Caprino	16	(7)
2019	Seregno	4	(0)
2020–	Vertovese		

International career
2009	Montenegro U19	5	(0)
- * Club domestic league appearances and goals

Stefan Nenadović (born 4 January 1991) is a Montenegrin footballer who plays for Italian side Vertovese.

== Club career ==
Born in Titograd, capital of Montenegro during the breakup of SFR Yugoslavia and Yugoslav Wars, Nenadović moved to Italy at young age. He played for Inter's Giovanissimi Nazionali team and won the league champion in 2006. In 2007, he left Inter's Allievi Regionali team and signed a youth contract with Monza. Since 2008–09 season, Inter either sold or loaned several players to Monza and reunited with Nenadović. With former Inter players formed the backbone of Monza's Berretti team, they finished as the league runner-up. He also played once for the first team in January 2010. He was released on 16 July 2010. He then signed by OFK Bar. He later played in the Italian lower leagues.

He holds both Serbian and Montenegrin citizenships.

=== International career ===
He capped 5 times for Montenegro U19 team, all in friendlies (Macedonia, Greece (twice) Serbia, and Belgium).

== Honours ==
Champion

- Campionato Giovanissimi Nazionali: 2006 (Inter youth)

Runner-up

- Campionato Nazionale Dante Berretti: 2009 (Monza youth)
