= Saveriano Infantino =

Italian footballer

Personal information
- Date of birth: 16 September 1986 (age 40)
- Place of birth: Tricarico, Italy
- Height: 1.88 m (6 ft 2 in)
- Position: Forward

Team information
- Current team: Notaresco
- Number: 32

Youth career
- –2004: Melfi

Senior career*
Years	Team	Apps	(Gls)
2004–2005	Ariano	13	(0)
2005–2006	Matera	18	(2)
2006	Ebolitana	6	(0)
2006–2007	Genzano	15	(4)
2007–2008	Acicatena	23	(4)
2008–2009	Bitonto	29	(9)
2009	Fidelis Andria	0	(0)
2009–2012	Barletta	66	(18)
2012–2014	L'Aquila	41	(12)
2014	→ Torres (loan)	15	(4)
2014–2015	Torres	9	(1)
2015	→ Ischia (loan)	17	(11)
2015–2016	Carrarese	11	(8)
2016–2017	Matera	31	(15)
2017–2019	Catanzaro	31	(7)
2019	Teramo	15	(9)
2019–2022	Carrarese	72	(26)
2022–2023	Taranto	12	(1)
2023	→ Gelbison (loan)	11	(1)
2023–	Matera	1	(0)
- * Club domestic league appearances and goals as of 23 April 2023

Saveriano Infantino (born 16 September 1986) is an Italian professional footballer who plays as a forward for Serie D club Matera.

== Club career ==
On 9 January 2023, Infantino joined Gelbison.

On 4 October 2023, Infantino returned to Matera.
