= Francesco Uliano =

Italian footballer

Personal information
- Date of birth: 19 September 1989 (age 37)
- Place of birth: Naples, Italy
- Height: 1.81 m (5 ft 11 in)
- Position: Midfielder

Team information
- Current team: San Marzano
- Number: 20

Senior career*
| Years | Team | Apps | (Gls) |
| 2008–2009 | Gela | 1 | (0) |
| 2009 | → Mezzocorona (loan) | 11 | (1) |
| 2009–2010 | Pergocrema | 32 | (2) |
| 2010–2011 | Ascoli | 16 | (0) |
| 2011–2012 | Südtirol | 31 | (0) |
| 2012 | Grosseto | 0 | (0) |
| 2012–2013 | Südtirol | 29 | (0) |
| 2013–2014 | Catanzaro | 7 | (1) |
| 2014–2015 | Mantova | 8 | (0) |
| 2014–2015 | → Pordenone (loan) | 10 | (0) |
| 2015 | → Monza (loan) | 13 | (2) |
| 2015–2016 | Monza | 22 | (2) |
| 2016 | Seregno | 8 | (1) |
| 2017 | Cavese | 5 | (0) |
| 2017–2023 | Gelbison | 174 | (32) |
| 2023 | Nocerina | 12 | (1) |
| 2023–2024 | San Marzano | 29 | (2) |
| 2024– | Sarnese | 0 | (0) |
- * Club domestic league appearances and goals as of 20 August 2024

Francesco Uliano (born 19 September 1989) is an Italian footballer who plays as a midfielder for Serie D club Sarnese.
