= Giovanni Kyeremateng =

Italian footballer (born 1991)

Personal information
- Date of birth: 20 February 1991 (age 35)
- Place of birth: Arona, Italy
- Height: 1.79 m (5 ft 10 in)
- Position: Forward

Youth career
- 2001–2009: Inter Milan
- 2007–2008: → Pro Sesto (loan)
- 2008–2009: → Monza (loan)

Senior career*
Years	Team	Apps	(Gls)
2008–2009	Inter Milan	0	(0)
2008–2009	→ Monza (loan)	1	(0)
2009	Monza	15	(0)
2011	→ Ascoli (loan)	0	(0)
2012	→ Montichiari (loan)	11	(1)
2012–2013	Treviso	19	(1)
2013–2014	Bellaria Igea	16	(2)
2014	Foggia	8	(0)
2014–2015	Imolese	23	(5)
2016	Rende	16	(4)
2016–2017	Nardò	23	(8)
2017	Trento	12	(0)
2017–2018	Matelica	17	(1)
2018–2019	Nardò	27	(5)
2019–2020	Vastogirardi	16	(11)
2020–2021	Savoia	31	(13)
2021–2023	Giugliano	29	(2)
2023	Vastese	13	(1)
2023–2024	Caratese	33	(3)
- * Club domestic league appearances and goals as of 10 February 2026

Giovanni Kyeremateng (born 20 February 1991) is an Italian footballer of Ghanaian descent who plays as a forward.

== Career ==
=== Youth career ===
Born in Arona, Piedmont, Giovanni started his career with his elder brother Basty at Internazionale. He played from Pulcini Regionali team in 2001–02 season to Allievi Nazionali under-17 team in 2007–08 season, winning the league champion with Giovanissimi Nazionali team in 2006. He also loaned to Allievi team of Pro Sesto in the first half of 2007–08 season along with Cristiano Biraghi, Marco Puntoriere and Domenico Maiese. He returned to Inter Allievi Nazionali in January 2008 and scored a goal in the round 16 of the league playoffs.

=== Monza ===
In 2008–09 season, Inter loaned some players to Monza, namely Paolo Campinoti, Nicolò De Cesare, Luca D'Errico, D.Maiese, Mirko Santoro, Davide Tremolada, Stefano Tresoldi, Maximiliano Uggè, Niccolò Scaccabarozzi and Francesco Poltero (since January). Kyeremateng also reunited with Giovanissimi Scudetto winning teammate Stefan Nenadović at Monza. He was bought outright by Monza in August 2009 for free

In 2010–11 season, due to injury and suspension (1 game due to hire two agents at the same time), he only played 3 matches so far (2 in the cup.) He also played a few matches as unused bench in September.

On 31 January 2011 he was loaned to Ascoli, in exchange with Simone Masini. He wore no.20 shirt. However, he only able to play in the under-20 team in the Campionato Nazionale Primavera.

On 11 January 2012 he left for Montichiari along with Houssem Chemali and Jeffrey Senou.

On 10 November 2012, he signed a contract with Treviso.

On 17 January 2023, Kyeremateng moved to Serie D club Vastese.

== Honours ==
Inter youth

- Campionato Giovanissimi Nazionali: 2006

Monza youth

- Campionato Nazionale Dante Berretti Runner-up: 2009
