= Domenico Maiese =

Italian footballer (born 1991)

Personal information
- Date of birth: 5 January 1991 (age 35)
- Place of birth: Vallo della Lucania, Italy
- Height: 1.74 m (5 ft 8 1/2 in)
- Position: Left back

Team information
- Current team: Pontecagnano

Youth career
- 2004–2009: Inter Milan
- 2007–2008: → Pro Sesto (loan)
- 2008–2009: → Monza (loan)

Senior career*
Years	Team	Apps	(Gls)
2009–2010	Monza	0	(0)
2009–2010	→ PontIsola (loan)	25	(0)
2010–2011	Asti	31	(2)
2011	Lecco	12	(0)
2012–2013	Delta Porto Tolle	37	(1)
2013–2014	Legnago	28	(3)
2014–2015	Roccella	31	(4)
2016	Gelbison	3	(0)
2016–2017	Ashton United		
2017–2018	Legnago	23	(2)
2018–2019	Gelbison	20	(0)
2019–2021	Virtus Cilento		
2021–2023	Agropoli		
2023–2024	Calpazio		
2024–	Pontecagnano		
- * Club domestic league appearances and goals as of 5 May 2024

Domenico Gennaro Nicoliello Maiese (born 5 January 1991) is an Italian footballer who plays as a defender for amateur side Pontecagnano.

== Career ==
=== Early career ===
Born in Vallo della Lucania, Campania, Maiese joined Inter Milan in 2004. He played from Giovanissimi Regionali under-14 team in 2004–05 season to Allievi Regionali under-16 team in 2006–07 season.

On 31 August 2007 he left for Pro Sesto Allievi Nazionali under-17 team, rejoining Inter teammates Cristiano Biraghi, Marco Puntoriere and Giovanni Kyeremateng (left in January).

In the next season he left for Monza along with G.Kyeremateng, Paolo Campinoti, Nicolò De Cesare, Luca D'Errico, Mirko Santoro, Davide Tremolada, Stefano Tresoldi, Maximiliano Uggè, Niccolò Scaccabarozzi and Francesco Poltero (since January). He finished as the runner-up of Berretti under-20 team.

In August 2009 Monza bought him outright (for free) along with 9 other Inter players. Maiese then left for Serie D club PontIsola on loan.

He was released in June 2010. On 2 September he left for another Serie D club Asti.

=== Lecco ===
On 26 July 2011 he left for Lecco. Maiese made his league debut on 4 September. He only missed a few game, to injury in round 8; suspended in round 10 and on the bench in round 13 and 14. He was substituted by Luca Viviani in the first half against Bellaria on 27 November and on 5 December 2011 his contract was terminated. Before he was released by Lecco, he still played for the first team in practice match against the reserve. However, he was not included in the match against Mantova F.C. on 4 December.

== Honours ==
Inter youth

- Campionato Giovanissimi Nazionali: 2006

Monza youth

- Campionato Nazionale Dante Berretti Runner-up: 2009
