= Antonio Porcino =

Italian footballer (born 1995)

Personal information
- Date of birth: 30 May 1995 (age 31)
- Place of birth: Reggio Calabria, Italy
- Height: 1.75 m (5 ft 9 in)
- Positions: Left-back; left midfielder

Team information
- Current team: Reggina
- Number: 71

Senior career*
Years	Team	Apps	(Gls)
2013–2015	Reggina	0	(0)
2013–2014	→ Santarcangelo (loan)	15	(0)
2014–2015	→ Taranto (loan)		
2015–2016	Benevento	0	(0)
2015–2016	→ Ischia (loan)	25	(1)
2016–2018	Reggina	55	(6)
2018	Catania	17	(1)
2018–2021	Livorno	67	(1)
2021–2022	Catanzaro	24	(1)
2022	Reggiana	2	(0)
2023	Gelbison	5	(0)
2023	Potenza	8	(0)
2023–	Reggina	4	(0)
- * Club domestic league appearances and goals as of 20 December 2023

Antonio Porcino (born 30 May 1995) is an Italian professional footballer who plays as a left-back or left midfielder for Serie D Group I club Reggina.

== Career ==
Porcino has played for Reggina, Santarcangelo, Taranto, Benevento, Ischia, Catania and Livorno.

On 20 January 2021, he signed a 1.5-year contract with Catanzaro.

On 31 January 2022, Porcino moved to Reggiana.

On 18 July 2023, Porcino joined Potenza on a one-year contract. On 28 October 2023, the club announced that Porcino's contract had been terminated by mutual agreement.
