= Nicolò De Cesare =

Italian footballer

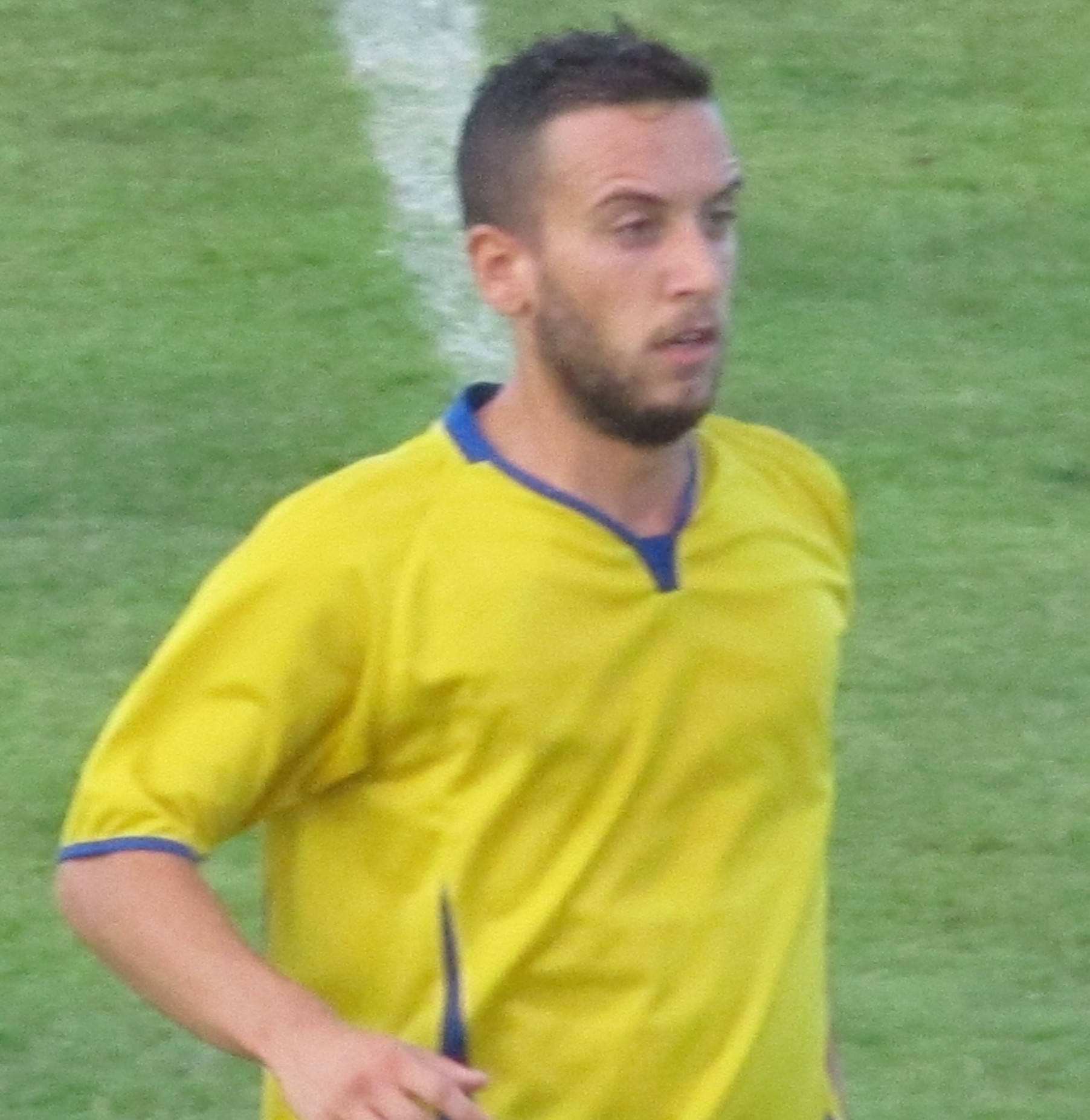

Personal information
- Date of birth: 31 January 1990 (age 36)
- Place of birth: Ascoli Piceno, Italy
- Height: 1.74 m (5 ft 9 in)
- Position: Midfielder

Youth career
- 2004–2009: Internazionale
- 2007–2008: → Pro Sesto (loan)
- 2008–2009: → Monza (loan)

Senior career*
Years	Team	Apps	(Gls)
2008–2009	Internazionale	0	(0)
2008–2009	→ Monza (loan)	1	(0)
2009–2011	Mezzocorona	24	(2)
2012–2013	Shumen 2010	15	(0)
2013–2020	Grottammare		
2020–2021	SSD Porto d'Ascoli		
2021–2022	Castelfidardo	11	(0)
2022	Maceratese		
2022	ASD Amatrice		
2022–2023	Chiesanuova FC		
2023–2024	Grottammare		
Total		51	(2)
- * Club domestic league appearances and goals

Nicolò De Cesare (born 31 January 1990) is an Italian former footballer who plays as a midfielder.

== Career ==
Born in Ascoli Piceno, Marche, De Cesare started his career with Internazionale in 2004. He played for the team from Giovanissimi Nazionali to Allievi Nazionali team. In the 2007–08 season, he left for the reserve team of Pro Sesto along with Andrea Bavena, Samuele Beretta, Mattia Dell'Aera, Davide Tremolada, Fabio Perissinotto (since January) and Luca Profeta (since January). In the next season, he left for Monza along with Paolo Campinoti, Luca D'Errico, G.Kyeremateng, Domenico Maiese, Mirko Santoro, D.Tremolada, Stefano Tresoldi, Maximiliano Uggè, Niccolò Scaccabarozzi and Francesco Poltero (since January). Which De Cesare played for its senior youth team – Berretti and played once in Lega Pro Prima Divisione.

In August 2009, he was signed by Seconda Divisione club Mezzocorona.

== Honours ==
Pro Sesto youth

- Campionato Nazionale Dante Berretti: 2008

Monza youth

- Campionato Nazionale Dante Berretti Runner-up: 2009
