= Houssem Chemali =

Algerian footballer (born 1991)

Personal information
- Date of birth: 26 June 1991 (age 35)
- Place of birth: Bordj Bou Arréridj, Algeria
- Height: 1.80 m (5 ft 11 in)
- Position: Midfielder

Team information
- Current team: Namur

Youth career
- –2004: Montrouge FC
- 2004–2007: INF Clairefontaine
- 2007–2009: Guingamp

Senior career*
Years	Team	Apps	(Gls)
2009–2012	Monza	14	(2)
2012	→ Montichiari (loan)	4	(0)
2013–2015	Sedan	0	(0)
2015–	Namur		
- * Club domestic league appearances and goals as of 29 December 2015

Houssem Chemali (born 26 June 1991) is an Algerian footballer who plays as a midfielder for Namur.

== Personal life ==
Chemali was born on 26 June 1991, in Bordj Bou Arréridj. At age 12, he moved with his family to France.

== Career ==
Chemali began his career in the junior ranks of Montrouge FC. In 2004, at age 13, Chemali was selected to join the INF Clairefontaine academy, where he would spend the next three years. At the end of his development at Clairefontaine, he joined Guingamp.

On 30 July 2009, he was signed by Monza.
