= Paolo Campinoti =

Italian footballer (born 1990)

Personal information
- Date of birth: 17 October 1990 (age 36)
- Place of birth: Massa, Italy
- Height: 1.78 m (5 ft 10 in)
- Position: Left midfielder

Team information
- Current team: Massese

Youth career
- Spezia
- 2005–2009: Internazionale
- 2007–2008: → Spezia (loan)
- 2008–2009: → Monza (loan)

Senior career*
Years	Team	Apps	(Gls)
2009–2012	Monza	48	(2)
2013–	Massese		
- * Club domestic league appearances and goals

Paolo Campinoti (born 17 October 1990) is an Italian footballer, who plays as a left midfielder for S.S.D. Massese.

== Career ==
Born in Massa, Tuscany, Campinoti started his career at La Spezia, Liguria, about 30 km away. In 2005, he was signed by Internazionale and played for Inter from Allievi Regionali team to Allievi Nazionali team. In 2007–08 season, he was loaned to Spezia along with Alessio Lanotte. In August 2008 he left for Monza on loan along with Nicolò De Cesare, Giovanni Kyeremateng, Domenico Maiese, Davide Tremolada, Maximiliano Uggè, Andrea Mancini and Niccolò Scaccabarozzi.

=== Monza ===
After spent a season with Monza's Berretti team, Campinoti promoted to the first team in 2009. Monza bought him outright in August 2009 for free. He played various position for the club, likes as a left back against Tritium in 2010–11 Coppa Italia Lega Pro, or as left midfielder in 4312/433 formation and often as substitutes.

== Honours ==
Monza youth

- Campionato Nazionale Dante Berretti Runner-up: 2009
