= Jeffrey Senou =

French footballer (born 1992)

Personal information
- Date of birth: 27 August 1992 (age 34)
- Place of birth: Courcouronnes, France
- Height: 1.72 m (5 ft 7 1/2 in)
- Position: Forward

Team information
- Current team: Viry-Châtillon

Youth career
- 2005–2008: INF Clairefontaine
- 2009–2011: RC Strasbourg

Senior career*
Years	Team	Apps	(Gls)
2011–2012	Monza	3	(0)
2012	→ A.C. Montichiari (loan)	0	(0)
2012–2014	Viry-Châtillon	14	(1)
- * Club domestic league appearances and goals as of 9 April 2014

Jeffrey Senou (born 27 August 1992) is a French footballer, and a native of Benin, who plays as a forward for the club of Viry-Châtillon.
