= Andrea Burato =

Italian professional footballer (born 1990)

Personal information
- Date of birth: 2 July 1990 (age 36)
- Place of birth: Soave, Italy
- Height: 1.77 m (5 ft 10 in)
- Position: Midfielder

Team information
- Current team: San Donato Tavarnelle

Youth career
- Chievo

Senior career*
Years	Team	Apps	(Gls)
2009–2011	Chievo	1	(0)
2009–2011	→ Verona (loan)	2	(0)
2010–2011	→ Südtirol (loan)	22	(0)
2011–2012	Mantova	32	(2)
2013	Treviso	9	(0)
2013–2014	Mezzocorona	25	(3)
2014–2015	Altovicentino	17	(0)
2015–2016	Dro Calcio	28	(3)
2016	Colligiana	9	(0)
2016–2017	Jolly Montemurlo	16	(5)
2017–2018	Folgore Caratese	32	(5)
2018	Città di Gela	9	(0)
2018–2019	Folgore Caratese	34	(0)
2019–2020	Milano City	9	(1)
2020–2021	Ponte San Pietro	13	(0)
2021	Cartigliano	19	(1)
2021–2022	Scandicci	30	(0)
2022–2023	Montecchio Maggiore	33	(5)
2023–	San Donato Tavarnelle	5	(0)

International career
2007	Italy U17	3	(0)
2009	Italy U20	1	(0)
- * Club domestic league appearances and goals as of 8 October 2023

Andrea Burato (born 2 July 1990) is an Italian professional footballer who plays for Serie D club San Donato Tavarnelle as a midfielder.

== Club career ==
He made his Serie A debut for Chievo on 31 May 2009 in a game against Napoli when he came on as a substitute in the 74th minute for Giuseppe Colucci.
