= Gelbison Cilento Vallo della Lucania =

Italian football club

Gelbison
- Full name: Gelbison Cilento Vallo della Lucania
- Founded: 1956
- Ground: Stadio Giovanni Morra, Vallo della Lucania, Italy
- Capacity: 2,250
- Chairman: Maurizio Puglisi
- Manager: Gianluca Esposito
- League: Serie D Group H
- 2023–24: Serie D Group H, 9th of 18
Home colours	Away colours

Gelbison Cilento Vallo della Lucania, commonly known as Gelbison, is an Italian association football club located in Vallo della Lucania, Campania. Gelbison currently plays in Serie D Group H.

== History ==
Former Gelbison logo to the foundation

Former Serre Alburni logo until 2011

The club was founded in 1956 as Unione Sportiva Gelbison Vallo which took its name from the Mount Gelbison, located near Vallo della Lucania.

The team appeared in the seasons 2007–08 and 2008–09 of Serie D and has played in Eccellenza Campania until the end of the season 2010–11.

In the summer 2011 the club has acquired the sports title of A.S.D. Serre Alburni, a team newly promoted in Serie D.

In 2022, Gelbison were promoted to Serie C for the first time in the club's history as Serie D Group I champions. They were however relegated back to Serie D immediately in their debut season, after being defeated by Messina in the playoffs.

== Colors and badge ==
Its colors are red and blue.

== Current squad ==
As of 24 February 2023

Note: Flags indicate national team as defined under FIFA eligibility rules; some limited exceptions apply. Players may hold more than one non-FIFA nationality.

No.	Pos.	Nation	Player
1	GK	ITA	Bernardino D'Agostino
2	DF	ITA	Arturo Onda
3	DF	ITA	Antonio Granata
4	DF	ITA	Riccardo Cargnelutti
5	DF	GAM	Bubacarr Marong (on loan from Palermo)
6	DF	ITA	Matteo Gilli
7	MF	ITA	Vittorio Graziani
8	MF	ITA	Francesco Uliano
9	FW	ITA	Saveriano Infantino
10	FW	ITA	Giuseppe Caccavallo
11	MF	ITA	Giovanni Di Fiore
12	GK	ITA	Dario Anatrella
14	MF	ITA	Salvatore Papa
18	FW	ITA	Carmine De Sena

No.	Pos.	Nation	Player
19	FW	SEN	Adama Sane (on loan from Hellas Verona)
20	MF	ITA	Federico Capone
21	MF	ITA	Giuseppe Fornito
22	GK	ITA	Samuele Vitale (on loan from Sassuolo)
23	MF	ITA	Giorgio Savini (on loan from Torino)
24	FW	ITA	Riccardo Correnti
27	DF	ITA	Ciro Loreto
28	MF	ITA	Christian Nunziante
29	FW	ITA	Nigel Kyeremateng
45	FW	ITA	Alessio Faella
69	MF	ITA	Jacopo Di Lorenzo
71	MF	ITA	Nicolò Francofonte (on loan from Gubbio)
77	MF	ITA	Antonio Porcino
93	FW	ITA	Marco Tumminello (on loan from Crotone)
