= Alessio Lanotte =

Italian footballer (born 1992)

Personal information
- Date of birth: 31 March 1992 (age 34)
- Place of birth: Barletta, Italy
- Position: Defender

Team information
- Current team: Andria

Youth career
- 2006–2008: Internazionale
- 2007–2008: → Spezia (loan)
- 2008–2009: Benevento

Senior career*
Years	Team	Apps	(Gls)
2009–2010	Barletta	10	(0)
2010	Viterbese	9	(0)
2010–2011	Trani	15	(1)
2011–2012	Casarano	13	(0)
2012–	Andria	2	(0)
- * Club domestic league appearances and goals

Alessio Lanotte (born 31 March 1992) is an Italian footballer who plays as a defender for Italian Lega Pro Prima Divisione club Andria.

== Career ==
Born in Barletta, Province of Barletta–Andria–Trani, Apulia, Lanotte joined F.C. Internazionale Milano in 2006. He was the member of Giovanissimi Nazionali under-15 team, as a midfielder. In August 2007 he left for Spezia along with Paolo Campinoti. In the next season he left for Benevento. He was the member of Allievi Nazionali under-17 team.

In 2009 Lanotte returned to hometown club Barletta. He was the member of the first team despite young age. He was the defender of the first 3 rounds of 2010–11 Lega Pro Seconda Divisione. but after the arrival of Simone Perico, Lanotte was on the bench. After a limited first team appearance, Lanotte left for Serie D team Viterbese on free transfer in October 2010. In December, he was signed by Apulian team Trani. In 2011–12 Serie D, he played for another Apulian team Casarano. On 1 February 2012 he returned to professional football for A.S. Andria BAT.
