= Basty Kyeremateng =

Ghanaian-born Italian footballer (born 1987)

Personal information
- Full name: Basty Owusu Kyeremateng
- Date of birth: 3 February 1987 (age 39)
- Place of birth: Kumasi, Ghana
- Position: Midfielder

Team information
- Current team: Borgopal

Youth career
- Internazionale

Senior career*
| Years | Team | Apps | (Gls) |
| 2006–2007 | Internazionale | 0 | (0) |
| 2006–2007 | → Alessandria (loan) | 29 | (1) |
| 2007–2008 | Canavese | 0 | (0) |
| 2008–2009 | Alghero | 7 | (0) |
| 2009–2010 | Pro Patria | 0 | (0) |
| 2010–2011 | Vimercatese | | |
| 2011– | Borgopal | | |
| Total | | 36 | (1) |
- * Club domestic league appearances and goals

Basty Owusu Kyeremateng (born 3 February 1987) is an Italian footballer who currently plays for A.C.D. Borgopal Calcio. Although born in Ghana, he moved to Italy at a young age.

== Biography ==
Basty started his career along with Giovanni Kyeremateng in Internazionale. He played for its Esordienti team to Primavera, the top of youth teams. In 2005–06 he was awarded the no.43 shirt of the first team, and played once in a club friendly. He wore the no.62 shirt in the 2006–07 season.

In August 2006 he was loaned to Serie D club Alessandria. He then left for Lega Pro teams Canavese, Alghero and Pro Patria. In the 2010/2011 season he played for A.S.D. Vimercatese Oreno and then joined ACD Borgopal on 2 August 2011.
