= Andrea Mancini =

Italian footballer (born 1992)

Personal information
- Date of birth: 13 August 1992 (age 34)
- Place of birth: Genoa, Italy
- Height: 1.80 m (5 ft 11 in)
- Position: Midfielder

Team information
- Current team: FC Cesena (sporting director)

Youth career
- 2005–2009: Inter Milan
- 2008–2009: → Monza (loan)
- 2009–2010: Bologna
- 2010–2011: Manchester City

Senior career*
Years	Team	Apps	(Gls)
2011–2012	Manchester City	0	(0)
2011	→ Oldham Athletic (loan)	1	(0)
2012	→ Fano (loan)	7	(0)
2012–2013	Real Valladolid B	7	(0)
2013–2014	Budapest Honvéd	11	(0)
2015	Haladás	2	(0)
2016	D.C. United	0	(0)
2016–2017	New York Cosmos	2	(0)
Total		30	(0)
- * Club domestic league appearances and goals

Andrea Mancini (born 13 August 1992) is an Italian former professional footballer who played as a midfielder, who currently as the sporting director of club Cesena.

== Playing career ==
=== Internazionale Primavera ===
Mancini started his career at Inter Milan where his father was the first team coach. He started as a member of the Giovanissimi Regionali team in the 2005–06 season, and had moved up to the Allievi Regionali team for the 2007–08 season. The next season (2008–09), he left Inter for a loan spell with the Monza youth team, along with a number of other young Inter players that included his elder brother, Filippo. He was released from Inter as a free agent in June 2009.

=== Manchester City ===
Mancini was signed up by the Manchester City 'Under-21' youth team in November 2010 after he was released by his former club Bologna in Italy. He scored 3 goals for Bologna reserve.

==== Oldham Athletic (loan) ====
On 3 November 2011, Mancini started a one-month loan spell at Oldham Athletic along with his Elite Development Squad teammate Luca Scapuzzi. He made his debut two days later as a late substitute in the Latics' home defeat to local rivals Bury and was also an 85th-minute substitute for the home side in the Football League Trophy quarter-final game against Crewe Alexandra three days later. Mancini extended his loan for a further month despite only appearing twice as a substitute so far. Andrea Mancini was sent back to his parent club after a disappointing loan spell, only making two substitute appearances in two months for the club.

=== Return to Manchester City ===
After spells at Fano and Oldham Athletic on loan, Andrea returned to Manchester City. On 25 May 2012 Manchester City released Andrea. Andrea only spent a year at the English club, making no senior appearances. Mancini was on trial with League One side Bournemouth during the 2012/13 pre-season.

=== Valladolid B ===
On 27 July 2012, Andrea signed a 1-year contract with Spanish club Real Valladolid B.

=== Budapest Honvéd ===
On 19 June 2013, Mancini was signed by Hungarian League club Budapest Honvéd. On 12 July 2013, Roberto Mancini watched his son live playing in the UEFA Europa League 2013–14 season against Čelik Nikšić. The match ended with a 9–0 victory for Budapest Honvéd.

On 29 October 2014, Mancini terminated his contract with Budapest Honvéd.

During his period in Budapest, Mancini played 23 matches and scored 2 goals. He made 11 appearances in the Hungarian League.

=== Szombathely ===
On 20 January 2015, Mancini was signed by Hungarian League club Szombathely.

=== D.C. United ===
On 5 March 2016, Mancini signed with D.C. United of Major League Soccer.

=== New York Cosmos ===
On 9 September 2016 Mancini signed with New York Cosmos of North American Soccer League.

== Post-playing career ==
In 2018, Mancini completed a course in sports management. After a short-lived career as a football agent, he worked at Fiorentina alongside sporting director Daniele Pradè.

In July 2023, he joined Sampdoria as part of the club's non-playing staff, working in the scouting and transfer area as a collaborator to technical area director Nicola Legrottaglie, being subsequently named the club's new sporting director shortly afterwards. After leaving by the end of the 2023–24 season to make room for new sporting director Pietro Accardi, on 8 April 2025 he was re-hired in his previous role, with Giovanni Invernizzi appointed alongside him as a technical area coordinator, following a reshuffle of the club's non-playing staff.

== Personal life ==
He is the youngest son of former Italian international Roberto Mancini.

== Honours ==
New York Cosmos

- NASL: 2016
