= Nicola Piras =

Italian footballer (born 1991)

Personal information
- Date of birth: 8 January 1991 (age 35)
- Place of birth: Brescia, Italy
- Height: 1.91 m (6 ft 3 in)
- Position: Forward

Youth career
- 2003–2008: Internazionale
- 2008–2009: Chievo

Senior career*
Years	Team	Apps	(Gls)
2009–2010	Chievo	0	(0)
2009–2010	→ Villafranca (loan)	32	(7)
2010–2011	Rodengo Saiano	23	(1)
2011	Carpenedolo	12	(3)
2011–2012	Darfo Boario	17	(6)
2012–2013	Seriate	29	(4)
2013	Sambonifacese	13	(5)
2014	SSD Mapello	18	(3)
2014	Lentigione Calcio		
2015	Montichiari	10	(1)
2015	US Darfo Boario		
2016	Fidenza		
2016	Orsa Iseo Intramedia		
2016–2017	ASD Rigamonti Castegnato		
2017–2018	US Vobarno		
2018	AC Castel D'Ario		
2018–2020	US Governolese		
2020–2022	Castellana		
2022–2023	AC Borgosatollo		
2023–2024	CSC Roncadelle Calcio		
- * Club domestic league appearances and goals as of 9 February 2026

Nicola Piras (born 8 January 1991) is an Italian footballer who plays as a forward.

== Career ==
=== Youth career ===
Born in Brescia, Lombardy, Piras started his career at F.C. Internazionale Milano. In the 2003–04 season, he was a member of the Giovanissimi Regionali B under-13 team. In the 2007–08 season, he was a member of the Allievi Nazionali under-17 team. He scored 4 goals in the half-season, and transferred to Chievo on 30 January 2008 (around round 16, out of 26 rounds). He was the 8th goalscorer of Inter U-17 (ranked least among the forwards), behind Luca Tremolada, Sulaiman Sesay Fullah, Simone Dell'Agnello (permanently borrowed from Allievi Regionali), Davide Santon (winger), Diego Falcinelli, Mattia Destro (also lend to Primavera) and Renato Ricci (winger). Piras spent 1 1/2 seasons with Chievo, with the latter half in its Primavera under-20 team. Piras was only able to play 10 times in the 2008–09 season.

=== Senior career ===
At the start of 2009–10 season, Piras was loaned to Serie D team Villafranca, located in Villafranca di Verona, the Province of Verona. Piras was selected for the national amateur under-18 team in 2010. After a successful season, Piras returned to professional football as Chievo sold him to Rodengo Saiano in co-ownership deal, for a peppercorn fee of €100. Piras only scored once in Lega Pro Seconda Divisione and was only able to play 10 starts. In June 2011, Chievo gave up the remaining 50% registration rights, but the Rodengo–Saiano team withdrew from 2011–12 Lega Pro Seconda Divisione.

At the start of 2011–12 season Piras joined Carpenedolo and in December 2011 left for another Lombardy team Darfo Boario.

That season he scored 10 times in total in Serie D. In the postseason he was voted the 4th best born 1991 players of Serie D by the readers of Tuttosport.

== Honours ==
Inter youth

- Campionato Giovanissimi Nazionali: 2006
- Campionato Allievi Nazionali: 2008
