= Alberto Gallinetta =

Italian footballer (born 1992)

Personal information
- Full name: Alberto Gallinetta
- Date of birth: 16 April 1992 (age 34)
- Place of birth: Giussano, Italy
- Height: 1.95 m (6 ft 5 in)
- Position: Goalkeeper

Team information
- Current team: SP Cailungo
- Number: 11

Youth career
- Base 96
- Meda
- 2004–2011: Internazionale
- 2009–2010: → Sassuolo (loan)
- 2011–2012: Parma

Senior career*
Years	Team	Apps	(Gls)
2012–2013	Parma	0	(0)
2012–2013	→ FeralpiSalò (loan)	16	(0)
2013–2018	Juventus	0	(0)
2013–2014	→ Chieti (loan)	6	(0)
2015	→ Gorica (loan)	8	(0)
2015–2016	→ Cercle Brugge (loan)	0	(0)
2016	→ Naxxar Lions (loan)	12	(0)
2016–2017	→ Santarcangelo (loan)	0	(0)
2017–2018	→ Ravenna (loan)	1	(0)
2019–2022	SP Cailungo	49	(0)
2022–2024	Pol. Lunano	1	(0)
2024–	SP Cailungo	53	(0)

International career^{‡}
2007–2008	Italy U16	7	(0)
2008	Italy U17	2	(0)
- * Club domestic league appearances and goals as of 26 June 2026 ‡ National team caps and goals as of 30 June 2014

Alberto Gallinetta (born 16 April 1992) is an Italian football player who plays as a goalkeeper for Cailungo.

== Club career ==
=== Early career ===
Born in Giussano, Italy, Gallinetta began his career within the youth academy of F.C. Internazionale Milano, where he remained until 2011, although he spent the 2009–10 campaign on loan with the youth squad at Serie B side U.S. Sassuolo Calcio. After returning to Inter prior to the 2011–12 season, his contract was not renewed and Gallinetta joined fellow Serie A outfit, Parma shortly thereafter, as a free agent in July 2011.

=== Parma F.C. ===
On from signing with the Emilia-Romagna-based club, the young goalkeeper spent his first season with the Primavera (under-20) team, before being loaned out to FeralpiSalò on 7 July 2012. During the 2013 winter transfer market, however, Parma sold Gallinetta to Serie A champions Juventus in a co-ownership deal in 4 1/2-year contract, in a direct cashless swap with Filippo Boniperti. Both 50% registration rights of the players were tagged for €1 million.

Gallinetta was recalled from his loan spell with FeralpiSalò after 16 league appearances (plus 2 appearances in the league cup and listed as an unused bench in the last game), though he did not officially join Juventus' rosters until 1 July 2013.

=== Juventus ===
After signing Gallinetta during the 2012–13 winter transfer market on a co-ownership deal from Parma, he officially joined Juventus on 1 July 2013.

On 28 August 2013, Gallinetta was loaned to Chieti on a season-long deal that expired on 30 June 2014. On 18 June 2014 Boniperti went to Parma outright for another €700,000, with Gallinetta also went to Juventus outright for €700,000.

On 1 January 2015 Gallinetta was signed by Slovenian club ND Gorica in a temporary deal, which was confirmed on 9 January. He also trained with the club since 4 September 2014.

In 2015–16 season, he left for Belgian club Cercle Brugge, and then Maltese club Naxxar Lions.

In 2016–17 season, he added one more year to his current contract (to 2018), but loaned to Italian Lega Pro club Santarcangelo at the same time. He played once for the team in 2016–17 Coppa Italia Lega Pro.

His contract expired at the end of the 2017–18 season, and he became a free agent.
