= Maximiliano Uggè =

Italian footballer

Personal information
- Full name: Maximiliano Achille Uggè
- Date of birth: 24 September 1991 (age 35)
- Place of birth: Treviglio, Italy
- Height: 1.90 m (6 ft 3 in)
- Position: Defender

Team information
- Current team: Chievo
- Number: 5

Youth career
- Inter
- 2008–2009: → Monza (loan)
- 2009–2010: Triestina
- 2010: Monza

Senior career*
Years	Team	Apps	(Gls)
2010–2012	Monza	38	(1)
2012–2013	Pavia	0	(0)
2012–2013	→ Lecco (loan)	18	(0)
2013–2015	Sūduva	97	(11)
2016–2019	Nõmme Kalju	117	(17)
2019–2020	Gozzano	25	(0)
2020–2021	Gubbio	33	(0)
2021–2022	FCI Levadia	45	(4)
2023–2024	Sant'Angelo	30	(4)
2024–	Chievo	57	(1)

International career^{‡}
2011	Italy U20	2	(0)
- * Club domestic league appearances and goals as of 4 March 2026 ‡ National team caps and goals as of 17 February 2016

Maximiliano Achille Uggè (born 24 September 1991) is an Italian professional footballer who plays as a defender for Serie D club Chievo.

== Career ==
Born in Treviglio, Lombardy, Uggè spent nearly a decade for Internazionale. He played for Inter from Pulcini team to Allievi Nazionali team in 2007–08 season. He won the national title with his age group in 2007–08 season and played a match for the first team during international break. For the 2008–09 season, Inter loaned him and several other youth players to Monza.

In the next season he left for Triestina's Primavera team, while Inter team-mate Luca Siligardi left for its first team. He also played the match against Inter Primavera that season, losing 0–6. On 2 February 2010, he was transferred to Monza again.

In the 2010–11 season, Uggè remained in Monza and was promoted to the first team, playing in both the league and then in the cup.

In the 2012–13 season he was transferred to AC Pavia, and was subsequently loaned to Lecco.

On 30 August 2019, he joined Gozzano.

On 30 July 2020 he signed a one-year contract with Gubbio.

On 22 June 2021, he returned to Estonia and signed with FCI Levadia.

== Honours ==
Levadia Tallinn

- Meistriliiga:2021
- Estonian Supercup: 2022

Nõmme Kalju

- Meistriliiga: 2018
- Estonian Supercup: 2019

Champion

- Campionato Nazionale Allievi: 2008 (Inter U17)
- Campionato Giovanissimi Nazionali: 2006 (Inter U15)

Runner-up

- Campionato Nazionale Dante Berretti: 2009 (Monza U20)
