= Campionato Primavera 3 =

Italian football competition

- Founded: 1966; 60 years ago
- Owner: Lega Pro
- No. of teams: 46 teams (regular season); 16 teams (finals)
- Country: Italy
- Continent: UEFA
- Most recent champion: Lecco (1st title)
- Most titles: Giulianova (5 titles)
- Promotion to: Campionato Primavera 2
- Website: Legapro.it

Campionato Primavera 3, formerly Campionato Nazionale Dante Berretti (or simply Campionato Berretti), is an Italian football competition played by youth teams (under 19) organized by the Lega Pro, and mainly composed by Serie C clubs but also by some Serie A and Serie B teams. The first edition was held in the 1966–67 season for Serie C clubs only, but the competition was opened to other series' clubs in the 1968–69. Since there the championship awarded multiple winning trophies, usually one for Serie C champion and one for the other categories' champion. From 1996–97 to 2003–04, only one winner was awarded.

== Format ==
In 2011–12 season, the age limit was age 19 (calendar age) at the end of competition (born on or after 1 January 1993), one year below Primavera (born 1992). In 2012–13 Primavera had changed its age limited to age 19 (calendar age) at the end of competition, matching Berretti's 19. In 2020, the tournament was reduced to 30 clubs, following the transformation in Primavera3.

== Past winners ==
=== Torneo "Dante Berretti" ===
Year	Serie C champion	Serie A/B champion	Serie D champion
1966–67	Casertana		
1967–68	Internapoli		
1968–69	Salernitana		Sangiovannese
1969–70	Novara		Mestrina
1970–71	Verbania		Trevigese
1971–72	Pisa	Milan	Astimacombi
1972–73	Padova	Bologna	Velletri Roma
1973–74	Imperia	Torino	Cremonese
1974–75	Padova	Torino	Montebelluna
1975–76	Cremonese	Fiorentina	Conegliano
1976–77	Giulianova	Lazio	Forlì
1977–78	Marsala	Torino	Conegliano
1978–79	Como	Fiorentina	Irpinia
1979–80	Teramo	Inter	Sulmona
1980–81	Juve Stabia	Torino	Irpinia
1981–82	Carrarese	Milan	
1982–83	Montebelluna	Milan	
1983–84	Giulianova	Inter	
1984–85	Giulianova	Milan	
1985–86	Lodigiani Roma	Torino	
1986–87	Angizia Luco	Avellino	
1987–88	Trento	Torino	
1988–89	R.M. Firenze	Torino	
1989–90	Lucchese	Milan	
1990–91	Carpi	Inter	
1991–92	Catanzaro	Torino	

=== Campionato Nazionale Juniores Torneo "Dante Berretti" ===
Year	Serie A/B/D champion	Serie C champion
1992–93	Cosenza	Leffe
1993–94	Milan	Nola
1994–95	Cesena	Leffe
1995–96	Avellino	Lodigiani

=== Campionato Nazionale "Dante Berretti" ===
Year	Serie A/B/D champion	Serie C champion
1996–97	Casarano	
1997–98	Lodigiani	
1998–99	Siena	
1999–2000	Battipagliese	
2000–01	Palermo	
2001–02	Juventus	
2002–03	Reggiana	
2003–04	Juventus	
2004–05	Juventus	Napoli
2005–06	Atalanta	Giulianova
2006–07	Torino	Perugia
2007–08	final stages not played	Pro Sesto
2008–09	Milan	Benevento
2009–10	Atalanta	Novara
2010–11	Napoli	Virtus Entella
2011–12	Inter	Frosinone Calcio
2012–13	Atalanta	Latina
2013–14	Torino	AlbinoLeffe
2014–15	Not awarded	Novara
2015–16	Inter Milan	Cittadella
2016–17	Inter Milan	Livorno
2017–18	Sassuolo	Feralpisalò
2018–19	Torino	Virtus Entella

...

- 2025: Lecco

== See also ==
- Campionato Nazionale Primavera
- Serie A
- Serie B
- Serie C
