= List of Italian football transfers summer 2013 (co-ownership) =

This is a list of Italian football transfers for co-ownership resolutions, for the 2013–14 season, from and to Serie A and Serie B.

According to Article 102 bis of NOIF (Norme Organizzative Interne della F.I.G.C), the co-ownership deal had to be confirmed each year. The deal could expire, be renewed, or one of the co-owners could buy back the other 50% of the player's rights. Deals that failed to form an agreement after the deadline were defined by auction between the two clubs; both clubs would submit their bid in a sealed envelope. Non-submission meant the player's rights would go to the other team for free. The mother club could sell their rights to third parties in a loan deal, such as Emiliano Viviano in 2010 and Massimo Volta in 2007.

Non-EU players are marked with a flag.

== Co-ownership ==
| Date | Name | Co-Owner (active) | Passive club (Mother club) | Result | Fee |
|---|---|---|---|---|---|
| 20 June 2013 | Daniele Abbracciante | Parma | Frosinone | Renewed | — |
| 21 June 2013 | Robert Acquafresca | Bologna | Genoa | Bologna | Auction, €1.267M |
| 21 June 2013 | Paride Addario | Gavorrano | Empoli | ND (Gavorrano) | Free |
| 21 June 2013 | Andrea Alderotti | Gavorrano | Empoli | ND (Gavorrano) | Free |
| 21 June 2013 | Masahudu Alhassan (Ghana) | Udinese | Genoa | Udinese | Auction, Undisclosed |
| 19 June 2013 | Francesco Anacoura | Juventus | Parma | Renewed | — |
| 21 June 2013 | Anselmo (Brazil) | Genoa | Palermo | Palermo | Auction, Undisclosed |
| 20 June 2013 | Andrea Arrighini | Reggina | Pontedera | Renewed | — |
| 19 June 2013 | Kwadwo Asamoah (Ghana) | Juventus | Udinese | Juventus | €9M |
| 20 June 2013 | Alberto Baccarin | Borgo-a-Buggiano | Fiorentina | ND (Borgo-a-Buggiano) | Free (team withdrew) |
| 20 June 2013 | Marko Bakić (Montenegro) | Fiorentina | Torino | Fiorentina | Undisclosed |
| 19 June 2013 | Marco Baldan | Nocerina | Milan | Nocerina | Undisclosed |
| 21 June 2013 | Mattia Bani | Reggiana | Genoa | ND (Reggiana) | Free |
| 20 June 2013 | Riccardo Barbuti | Barletta | Sassuolo | Sassuolo | €500 |
| 18 June 2013 | Paulo Vitor Barreto (Brazil) (Note: Barreto also holds Italian citizenship.) | Torino | Udinese | Renewed | — |
| 21 June 2013 | Daniele Baselli | Cittadella | Atalanta | Atalanta | Auction, €803,500 |
| 21 June 2013 | Migjen Basha (Albania) (Note: Basha and Stevanović are Swiss citizen. European Union and Switzerland had special agreement on free movement of labour.) | Torino | Atalanta | Torino | Auction, €350,000 |
| 21 June 2013 | Giacomo Bassoli | Cesena | Bologna | ND (Cesena) | Free |
| 20 June 2013 | Nazzareno Belfasti | Juventus | Modena | Juventus | Undisclosed |
| 18 June 2013 | Nicola Bellomo | Chievo | Bari | Renewed | — |
| 20 June 2013 | Nicolò Belotti | Parma | Brescia | Renewed | — |
| 19 June 2013 | Simone Benedetti | Internazionale | Torino | Internazionale | Undisclosed (swap with Stevanovic) |
| 17 June 2013 | Giacomo Beretta | Genoa | Milan | Milan | Undisclosed |
| 20 June 2013 | Andrea Bertolacci | Genoa | Roma | Renewed | — |
| 20 June 2013 | Jonathan Biabiany (France) | Parma | Sampdoria | Renewed | — |
| 20 June 2013 | Niko Bianconi | Juventus | Vicenza | Renewed | — |
| 19 June 2013 | Richmond Boakye (Ghana) | Juventus | Genoa | Renewed | — |
| 20 June 2013 | Edoardo Bonicelli | Cesena | Vicenza | ND (Cesena) | Free |
| 19 June 2013 | Filippo Boniperti | Parma | Juventus | Renewed | — |
| 21 June 2013 | Andrea Boron | Alessandria | Padova | ND (Alessandria) | Free |
| 14 June 2013 | Marco Bortoli | Milan | Novara | Milan | Undisclosed |
| 20 June 2013 | Fabrizio Bramati | Cesena | Crotone | Renewed | — |
| 20 June 2013 | Gonçalo Brandão | Parma | Siena | Renewed | — |
| 20 June 2013 | Oscar Branzani | Cittadella | Sampdoria | ND (Cittadella) | Free |
| 21 June 2013 | Nicolò Brighenti | Vicenza | Chievo | Chievo | Auction, €18,000 |
| 20 June 2013 | Riccardo Brosco | Pescara | Parma | Parma | Undisclosed |
| 13 June 2013 | Alessio Bruno | Pescara | Vicenza | Renewed | — |
| 19 June 2013 | Marcel Büchel (Liechtenstein) | Juventus | Siena | Renewed | — |
| 21 June 2013 | Alin Bucuroiu (Romania) | Siena | Udinese | ND (Siena) | Free |
| 21 June 2013 | Kadir Caidi | Bologna | Cesena | ND (Bologna) | Free |
| 20 June 2013 | Luca Caldirola | Cesena | Internazionale | Internazionale | €2.5M |
| 21 June 2013 | Amedeo Calliari | Monza | Chievo | Monza | Auction, Undisclosed |
| 19 June 2013 | Simone Calvano | Verona | Milan | Renewed | — |
| 19 June 2013 | Carlo Alberto Calvetti | Verona | Milan | Verona | Undisclosed |
| 20 June 2013 | Tommaso Cancellotti | Pro Vercelli | Sampdoria | Renewed | — |
| 21 June 2013 | Marco Cane | Aprilia | Genoa | Genoa | Auction, Undisclosed |
| 19 June 2013 | Michele Canini | Atalanta | Genoa | Renewed | — |
| 20 June 2013 | Riccardo Capogna | Chieti | Parma | Chieti | Undisclosed (swap with Mungo) |
| 13 June 2013 | Andrea Cappa | Vicenza | Pescara | Renewed | — |
| 20 June 2013 | Gianluca Caprari | Pescara | Roma | Roma | €2M (Piscitella + Politano) |
| 18 June 2013 | Giuseppe Capua | Salernitana | Lazio | Lazio | Undisclosed |
| 21 June 2013 | Antonio Caracciolo | Brescia | Genoa | Brescia | Auction, Undisclosed |
| 13 June 2013 | Francesco Caratelli | Pescara | Vicenza | Renewed | — |
| | Gianluca Carfora | Cuneo | Juventus | | |
| | Mirko Carretta | Benevento | Chievo | | |
| 19 June 2013 | Ignazio Carta | Savona | Cagliari | Savona | Undisclosed |
| 18 June 2013 | Riccardo Casini | Parma | Bologna | Bologna | €1M (swap with Finocchio) |
| 21 August 2013 | Luca Castiglia | Vicenza | Juventus | Juventus | €350,000 |
| | Francesco Cattenari | Campobasso | Pescara | | |
| 20 June 2013 | Giulio Cavallari | Siena | Vicenza | Siena | €750,000 (swap with Marcone) |
| | Federico Cenerini | Giacomense | Chievo | | |
| 20 June 2013 | Alessio Cerci | Torino | Fiorentina | Torino | Undisclosed |
| 20 June 2013 | Francesco Checcucci | Crotone | Chievo | ND (Crotone) | Free |
| 19 June 2013 | Yussif Raman Chibsah (Ghana) | Parma | Juventus | Parma | €1M (signed by Sassuolo) |
| 19 June 2013 | Mauro Cioffi | Parma | Crotone | Renewed | — |
| 14 June 2013 | Andrea Cocco | Verona | Albinoleffe | Renewed | — |
| | Isaac Cofie (Ghana) | Chievo | Genoa | | |
| 19 June 2013 | Jacopo Coletta | Lumezzane | Chievo | Chievo | Undisclosed |
| 20 June 2013 | Davide Colomba | Ascoli | Parma | Renewed | — |
| 18 June 2013 | Gianmario Comi | Milan | Torino | Renewed | — |
| 27 July 2013 | Kévin Constant | Milan | Genoa | Milan | €6M (€2.5M + Strasser) |
| 20 June 2013 | Manuel Coppola | Siena | Parma | Renewed | — |
| 20 June 2013 | Elia Cortesi | Carpi | Atalanta | Renewed | — |
| 20 June 2013 | Lorenzo Crisetig | Parma | Internazionale | Renewed | — |
| | Roberto Crivello | San Marino | Juventus | | |
| | Marco Cuomo | Melfi | Catania | | |
| | Stefano D'Agostino | Catanzaro | Sampdoria | | |
| | Matteo D'Alessandro | Reggina | Genoa | | |
| 19 June 2013 | Loris Damonte | Varese | Genoa | Renewed | — |
| 20 June 2013 | Matteo Darmian | Torino | Palermo | Torino | €1.5M |
| | Andrea De Falco | Bari | Chievo | | |
| | Alessandro De Leidi | Barletta | Atalanta | | |
| | Andrea De Paola | Carpi | Juventus | | |
| | Elio De Silvestro | Pro Vercelli | Juventus | | |
| | Alessandro De Vena | Viareggio | Napoli | | |
| 20 June 2013 | Pasquale De Vita | Verona | Atalanta | Renewed | — |
| | Andrea De Vito | Cittadella | Milan | | |
| 20 June 2013 | Grégoire Defrel | Cesena | Parma | Renewed | — |
| 18 June 2013 | Lorenzo Degeri | Cremonese | Internazionale | Renewed | — |
| 19 June 2013 | Luca Del Papa | Juventus | Pescara | Juventus | Undisclosed (swap with Maniero) |
| 20 June 2013 | Nicola Del Pivo | Parma | Cesena | Cesena | €1.5M |
| 19 June 2013 | Francesco Della Rocca | Palermo | Bologna | Renewed | — |
| 20 June 2013 | Paolo Hernán Dellafiore | Siena | Parma | Renewed | — |
| | Salam Dené (Burkina Faso) | Salernitana | Lazio | | |
| 21 June 2013 | Simone Di Dio | Martina | Juventus | ND (Martina) | Free |
| 20 June 2013 | Matteo Di Gennaro | Parma | Ascoli | Renewed | — |
| 12 June 2013 | Filippo Di Pentima | Vicenza | Pescara | Renewed | — |
| 21 June 2013 | Mattia Di Vincenzo | Aprilia | Siena | Siena | Auction, Undisclosed |
| 20 June 2013 | Milan Đurić (Bosnia and Herzegovina) | Parma | Cesena | Renewed | — |
| 20 August 2013 | Abdou Doumbia | Siena | Parma | Parma | €100,000 |
| 20 June 2013 | Omar El Kaddouri (Morocco) | Napoli | Brescia | Napoli | Undisclosed |
| 19 June 2013 | Mirko Eramo | Crotone | Sampdoria | Sampdoria | Undisclosed |
| | Simone Esposito | Grosseto | Juventus | | |
| 20 June 2013 | Thomas Fabbri | Parma | Cesena | Renewed | — |
| 20 June 2013 | Marcello Falzerano | Grosseto | Chievo | Chievo | Undisclosed |
| 19 June 2013 | Marco Davide Faraoni | Udinese | Internazionale | Udinese | Undisclosed |
| 21 June 2013 | Alessio Fatticcioni | Gavorrano | Fiorentina | ND (Gavorrano) | Free |
| 19 June 2013 | Francesco Fedato | Bari | Catania | Renewed | — |
| 21 June 2013 | Davide Ferrari | San Marino | Brescia | Brescia | Auction, €1,000 |
| 20 June 2013 | Daniele Ferri | Brescia | Cesena | Renewed | — |
| 18 June 2013 | Riccardo Fiamozzi | Torino | Varese | Varese | Undisclosed |
| 18 June 2013 | Francesco Finocchio | Bologna | Parma | Parma | €1M (swap with Casini) |
| 20 June 2013 | Luca Fiordiani | Parma | Foligno | Parma | €75,000 |
| 21 June 2013 | Francesco Fiore | Aosta Valley | Torino | ND (Aosta Valley) | Free |
| 19 June 2013 | Filippo Fondi | Pisa | Chievo | Chievo | Undisclosed |
| 20 June 2013 | Francesco Forte | Internazionale | Pisa | Renewed | — |
| 19 June 2013 | Domenico Franco | Paganese | Chievo | Chievo | Undisclosed |
| 11 June 2013 | Alberto Frison | Catania | Vicenza | Catania | €700,000 |
| 20 June 2013 | Manolo Gabbiadini | Juventus | Atalanta | Renewed | — |
| 20 June 2013 | Jacopo Galimberti | Parma | Internazionale | Internazionale | Undisclosed |
| 20 June 2013 | Niccolò Galli | Padova | Parma | Renewed | — |
| 19 June 2013 | Alberto Gallinetta | Juventus | Parma | Renewed | — |
| 12 June 2013 | Mattia Gallon | Savona | Cagliari | Cagliari | Undisclosed |
| 20 June 2013 | Alberto Galuppo | Siena | Parma | Renewed | — |
| 19 June 2013 | Luca Garritano | Cesena | Internazionale | Renewed | — |
| 20 June 2013 | Leonardo Gatto | Pisa | Atalanta | Atalanta | Undisclosed |
| 20 June 2013 | Vincenzo Gatto | Aversa Normanna | Napoli | ND (Aversa Normanna) | Free |
| 20 June 2013 | Federico Gerardi | Reggina | Udinese | Reggina | Undisclosed |
| 18 June 2013 | Luca Ghiringhelli | Novara | Milan | Milan | Undisclosed |
| 20 June 2013 | Kamil Glik | Torino | Palermo | Torino | €1.5M |
| 20 June 2013 | Pablo Granoche (Note: Granoche also holds Italian citizenship, thus counted as European Union citizen.) (Uruguay) | Cesena | Chievo | Chievo | €500 |
| 20 June 2013 | Angelo Gregorio | Bologna | Cesena | ND (Bologna) | Free |
| 20 June 2013 | Giulio Grifoni | Gavorrano | Fiorentina | ND (Gavorrano) | Free |
| 20 June 2013 | Fabrizio Grillo | Siena | Varese | Renewed | — |
| 18 June 2013 | Paolo Grossi | Verona | Siena | Renewed | — |
| 19 June 2013 | Marco Guzzo | Siena | Verona | Renewed | — |
| 19 June 2013 | Samir Handanović | Internazionale | Udinese | Internazionale | Undisclosed |
| 17 June 2013 | Yonese Hanine | Ascoli | Chievo | Renewed | — |
| 21 June 2013 | Carlo Ilari | Juventus | Ascoli | Juventus | Auction, Undisclosed |
| 19 June 2013 | Ciro Immobile | Genoa | Juventus | Renewed | — |
| 19 June 2013 | Manuel Iori | Padova | Chievo | Renewed | — |
| 19 June 2013 | Mauricio Isla (Chile) | Juventus | Udinese | Renewed | — |
| 19 June 2013 | Luca Isoardi | Aosta Valley | Torino | Torino | Undisclosed |
| 21 June 2013 | Giuseppe Iuliano | Pro Patria | Napoli | ND (Pro Patria) | Free |
| 20 June 2013 | Armando Izzo | Avellino | Napoli | Renewed | — |
| 21 June 2013 | Jefferson (Brazil) (Note: Jefferson also holds Italian citizenship, thus counted as European Union citizen.) | Latina | Fiorentina | ND (Latina) | Free |
| 14 June 2013 | Panagiotis Kone | Bologna | Brescia | Bologna | €1.6M |
| 20 June 2013 | Jan Koprivec | Perugia | Udinese | Perugia | Undisclosed |
| 20 June 2013 | Rene Krhin | Bologna | Internazionale | Renewed | — |
| 20 June 2013 | Gianluca Lapadula | Cesena | Parma | Parma | €1.4M |
| 19 June 2013 | Alberto Libertazzi | Novara | Juventus | Renewed | – |
| 20 June 2013 | Marko Livaja | Atalanta | Inter | Renewed | — |
| 20 June 2013 | Fabio Lucioni | Reggina | Siena | ND (Reggina) | Free |
| 21 June 2013 | Jacopo Luppi | Cesena | Bologna | ND (Cesena) | Free |
| 21 June 2013 | Luca Maccabiti | Lumezzane | Brescia | ND (Lumezzane) | Free |
| 19 June 2013 | Nicola Madonna | Spezia | Atalanta | Renewed | — |
| 20 June 2013 | Nicola Malaccari | Gubbio | Atalanta | Renewed | — |
| 21 June 2013 | Alessandro Malomo | Prato | Roma | ND (Prato) | Free |
| 20 June 2013 | Dario Maltese | Viareggio | Palermo | Palermo | €45,000 |
| 21 June 2013 | Marco Mancosu | Benevento | Cagliari | Benevento | Auction, Undisclosed |
| 20 June 2013 | Matteo Mandorlini | Brescia | Parma | Brescia | Free |
| 21 June 2013 | Nicolò Manfredini | Modena | Fiorentina | ND (Modena) | Free |
| 19 June 2013 | Riccardo Maniero | Pescara | Juventus | Pescara | Undisclosed |
| 21 June 2013 | Daniele Mannini | Siena | Napoli | ND (Siena) | |
| 20 June 2013 | Matteo Mantovani | Crotone | Parma | Renewed | — |
| 20 June 2013 | Diego Manzoni | Genoa | Parma | Renewed | — |
| 17 June 2013 | Lorenzo Marchionni | Chievo | Ascoli | Renewed | — |
| 20 June 2013 | Richard Gabriel Marcone | Vicenza | Siena | Vicenza | €750,000 (swap with Cavallari) |
| 20 June 2013 | Ferdinando Mastroianni | Gavorrano | Bari | ND (Gavorrano) | Free |
| 18 June 2013 | Andrea Mazzarani | Napoli | Udinese | Udinese | Undisclosed |
| 18 June 2013 | Miguel Medina (Paraguay) | Napoli | Udinese | Udinese | Undisclosed |
| 20 June 2013 | Riccardo Melgrati | Cesena | Internazionale | Cesena | Undisclosed |
| 20 June 2013 | Diego Mella | Parma | Internazionale | Internazionale | Undisclosed |
| 20 June 2013 | Ledian Memushaj (Albania) | Lecce | Chievo | Lecce | Undisclosed |
| 21 June 2013 | Matteo Merini | Carrarese | Chievo | ND (Carrarese) | Free |
| 21 June 2013 | Alexander Merkel (Kazakhstan) | Udinese | Genoa | Udinese | Auction, €1.16M |
| 20 June 2013 | Umberto Miello | Monza | Torino | Renewed | — |
| 21 June 2013 | Marco Migliorini | Como | Torino | ND (Como) | Free |
| 19 June 2013 | Luca Miracoli | Varese | Genoa | Renewed | — |
| 21 June 2013 | Marcos Miranda (Brazil) | Pro Vercelli | Fiorentina | ND (Pro Vercelli) | Free |
| 21 June 2013 | Mattia Montini | Benevento | Roma | Benevento | Auction, €63,000 |
| 20 June 2013 | Domenico Mungo | Chieti | Parma | Parma | Undisclosed (swap with Capogna) |
| 18 June 2013 | Maikol Negro | Nocerina | Catania | Nocerina | Undisclosed |
| 20 June 2013 | Vincenzo Nitride | Monza | Torino | Renewed | — |
| 21 June 2013 | Isaac Ntow (Ghana) | Brescia | Internazionale | ND (Brescia) | Free |
| 20 June 2013 | Nwankwo (Nigeria) | Parma | Internazionale | Parma | Undisclosed |
| 20 June 2013 | Ephraim O'Neal | Cesena | Brescia | Renewed | — |
| 20 June 2013 | Alessandro Orchi | Catanzaro | Roma | Renewed | — |
| 21 June 2013 | Wilfred Osuji (Nigeria) | Padova | Milan | ND (Padova) | Free |
| 17 June 2013 | Davide Pacifico | Milan | Novara | Renewed | — |
| 20 June 2013 | Giuseppe Pacini | Parma | Siena | Renewed | — |
| 21 June 2013 | Emanuele Padella | Grosseto | Parma | ND (Grosseto) | Free |
| 12 June 2013 | Alberto Paloschi | Chievo | Milan | Renewed | — |
| 20 June 2013 | Luigi Palumbo | Cesena | Parma | Cesena | €1.5M |
| 21 June 2013 | Michel Panatti | Avellino | Fiorentina | ND (Avellino) | Free |
| 20 June 2013 | Lorenzo Pasqualini | Parma | Ascoli | Renewed | — |
| 19 June 2013 | Cristian Pasquato | Udinese | Juventus | Renewed | — |
| 19 June 2013 | Marco Pavanello | Alessandria | Chievo | Chievo | Undisclosed |
| 20 June 2013 | Thomas Pedrabissi | Cesena | Internazionale | Cesena | Undisclosed |
| 20 June 2013 | Cristian Pedrinelli | Parma | Brescia | Parma | €80,000 |
| 21 June 2013 | Eros Pellegrini | Viareggio | Palermo | ND (Viareggio) | Free |
| 18 June 2013 | Riccardo Perpetuini | Salernitana | Lazio | Lazio | Undisclosed |
| 20 June 2013 | Stefano Pettinari | Crotone | Roma | Renewed | — |
| 14 June 2013 | Andrea Peverelli | Novara | Milan | Novara | Undisclosed |
| 20 June 2013 | Carlo Pinsoglio | Vicenza | Juventus | Renewed | — |
| 21 June 2013 | Eros Pisano | Genoa | Palermo | Palermo | Auction, €531,000 |
| 21 June 2013 | Michele Pisanu | Entella | Cagliari | ND (Entella) | Free |
| 20 June 2013 | Giammario Piscitella | Genoa | Roma | Roma | €1.5M |
| 21 June 2013 | Luca Pompilio | Juve Stabia | Varese | ND (Juve Stabia) | Free |
| 20 June 2013 | Jonas Portin (Finland) | Parma | Padova | Parma | Free (retired) |
| 20 June 2013 | Mattia Proietti | Bassano | Juventus | Renewed | — |
| 21 June 2013 | Alessandro Provenzano | Martina | Catania | ND (Martina) | Free |
| 20 June 2013 | Raffaele Pucino | Varese | Chievo | Renewed | — |
| 20 June 2013 | Antonino Ragusa | Pescara | Genoa | Renewed | — |
| 20 June 2013 | Fabio Reato | Cesena | Pavia | Renewed | — |
| 20 June 2013 | Vasco Regini | Sampdoria | Empoli | Renewed | — |
| 21 June 2013 | Federico Rodríguez (Uruguay) (Spain) | Bologna | Genoa | Bologna | Free |
| 21 June 2013 | Simone Romagnoli | Pescara | Milan | ND (Pescara) | Free |
| 21 June 2013 | Dario Romano | Alessandria | Juventus | ND (Alessandria) | Free |
| 20 June 2013 | Niccolò Romero | Savona | Genoa | Genoa | Undisclosed |
| 21 June 2013 | Marco Romizi | Bari | Fiorentina | ND (Bari) | Free |
| 21 June 2013 | Paolo Ropolo | Gavorrano | Torino | ND (Gavorrano) | Free |
| 20 June 2013 | Andrea Rossi | Parma | Siena | Renewed | — |
| 20 June 2013 | Andrea Rossini | Parma | Cesena | Renewed | — |
| 20 June 2013 | Jonathan Rossini | Udinese | Sampdoria | Sampdoria | Undisclosed |
| 19 June 2013 | Emanuele Rovini | Empoli | Udinese | Renewed | — |
| 21 June 2013 | Gianluca Rubin | South Tyrol | Juventus | ND (South Tyrol) | Free |
| 20 June 2013 | Matteo Rubin | Siena | Torino | Siena | €100,000 |
| 20 June 2013 | Alessandro Ruggeri | Reggina | Cuneo | Reggina | Undisclosed |
| 20 June 2013 | Nicola Russo | Nocerina | Parma | Parma | Undisclosed |
| 20 June 2013 | Stefano Russo | Brescia | Parma | Renewed | — |
| 20 June 2013 | Andrea Russotto | Catanzaro | Parma | Renewed | — |
| 20 June 2013 | Francesco Sabatucci | Lumezzane | Chievo | Renewed | — |
| 20 June 2013 | Salvatore Sandomenico | Arzanese | Parma | Parma | Undisclosed |
| 20 June 2013 | Gianluca Sansone | Sampdoria | Sassuolo | Sampdoria | Undisclosed |
| 20 June 2013 | Fabiano Santacroce | Parma | Napoli | ND (Parma) | Free |
| 14 June 2013 | Riccardo Saponara | Milan | Empoli | Renewed | — |
| 17 June 2013 | Lorenzo Saporetti | Milan | Cesena | Renewed | — |
| 19 June 2013 | Andrea Sbraga | Pisa | Lazio | Lazio | Undisclosed |
| 21 June 2013 | Marco Schiavino | Como | Crotone | Crotone | Auction, Undisclosed |
| 19 June 2013 | Andrea Schiavone | Siena | Juventus | Renewed | — |
| 21 June 2013 | Alessandro Scialpi | Como | Varese | ND (Como) | Free |
| 21 June 2013 | Luigi Scotto | Savona | Genoa | ND (Savona) | Free |
| 21 June 2013 | Federico Sevieri | Lumezzane | Lazio | ND (Lumezzane) | Free |
| 21 June 2013 | Mario Sgambato | Vicenza | Napoli | ND (Vicenza) | Free |
| 21 June 2013 | Simone Simeri | Melfi | Napoli | ND (Melfi) | Free |
| 20 June 2013 | Frederik Sørensen (Denmark) | Bologna | Juventus | Renewed | — |
| 20 June 2013 | Nicolò Sperotto | Carpi | Torino | Renewed | — |
| 19 June 2013 | David Speziale | Lecce | Milan | Milan | Undisclosed |
| 19 June 2013 | Leonardo Spinazzola | Juventus | Siena | Renewed | — |
| 20 June 2013 | Mattia Stefanelli (San Marino) | Crotone | Cesena | Renewed | — |
| 19 June 2013 | Alen Stevanović (Serbia) | Torino | Internazionale | Torino | Undisclosed |
| 19 June 2013 | Adrian Stoian (Romania) | Chievo | Roma | Renewed | — |
| 21 June 2013 | Gerardo Strumbo | Milazzo | Catania | ND (Milazzo) | Free |
| 20 June 2013 | Panagiotis Tachtsidis (Greece) | Roma | Genoa | Genoa | €3M |
| 21 June 2013 | Max Taddei | Venezia | Fiorentina | ND (Venezia) | Free |
| 21 June 2013 | Filippo Tajani | Fondi | Grosseto | ND (Fondi) | Free |
| 21 June 2013 | Tallo (Ivory Coast) | Roma | Chievo | Roma | Auction, €215,000 |
| 20 June 2013 | Zsolt Tamási (Hungary) | Ascoli | Parma | Renewed | — |
| 20 June 2013 | Lorenzo Tassi | Inter | Brescia | Renewed | — |
| 19 June 2013 | Leonardo Terigi | Crotone | Genoa | Renewed | — |
| 17 June 2013 | Pietro Terracciano | Catania | Nocerina | Catania | Undisclosed |
| 17 June 2013 | Emanuele Testardi | Südtirol | Sampdoria | Sampdoria | Undisclosed |
| 21 June 2013 | Antonio Tognarelli | Gavorrano | Empoli | ND (Gavorrano) | Free |
| 20 June 2013 | Nenad Tomović (Serbia) | Fiorentina | Genoa | Fiorentina | Auction, Undisclosed |
| 20 June 2013 | Simone Tonelli | Vicenza | Cesena | ND (Vicenza) | Free |
| 20 June 2013 | Dario Toninelli | Bassano | Varese | Renewed | — |
| 20 June 2013 | Andrea Tozzo | Sampdoria | Verona | Renewed | — |
| 20 June 2013 | Luca Tremolada | Como | Inter | Renewed | — |
| 19 June 2013 | James Troisi (Australia) | Atalanta | Juventus | Renewed | — |
| 20 June 2013 | Alessandro Tuia | Salernitana | Lazio | Renewed | — |
| 21 June 2013 | Alberto Tundo | Aprilia | Siena | ND (Aprilia) | Free |
| 18 June 2013 | Mattia Valoti | Milan | AlbinoLeffe | Renewed | — |
| 20 June 2013 | Enrico Verachi | Como | Cagliari | Renewed | — |
| 18 June 2013 | Simone Verdi | Torino | Milan | Renewed | — |
| 20 June 2013 | Valerio Verre | Genoa | Roma | Roma | €2.5M |
| 21 June 2013 | Dani Verruschi | Pontedera | Reggina | ND (Pontedera) | Free |
| 21 June 2013 | Alessandro Videtta | Treviso | Empoli | ND (Treviso) | Free |
| 12 June 2013 | Mauro Vigorito | Lumezzane | Cagliari | Cagliari | Undisclosed |
| 20 June 2013 | Marco Villanova | San Marino | Atalanta | ND (San Marino) | Free |
| 19 June 2013 | Kevin Vinetot (France) | Genoa | Crotone | Renewed | — |
| 20 June 2013 | Nicolas Viola | Palermo | Reggina | Renewed | — |
| 19 June 2013 | Francesco Virdis | Savona | Chievo | Savona | €80,000 |
| 20 June 2013 | Alessio Vita | Monza | Torino | Renewed | — |
| 20 June 2013 | Guy Yao (Ivory Coast) | Inter | Parma | Renewed | — |
| 20 June 2013 | Enrico Zampa | Salernitana | Lazio | Renewed | — |
| 20 June 2013 | Domenico Zampaglione | HinterReggio | Chievo | ND (HinterReggio) | Free |
| 20 June 2013 | Davide Zappacosta | Avellino | Atalanta | Renewed | — |

== See also ==
- List of Italian football transfers summer 2012 (co-ownership)
