= List of Italian football transfers summer 2012 (co-ownership) =

This is a list of Italian football transfers for co-ownership resolutions, for the 2012–13 season, from and to Serie A and Serie B.

According to Article 102 bis of NOIF (Norme Organizzative Interne della FIGC), the co-ownership deal had to be confirmed each year. The deal could expire, be renewed, be bought back or be sold outright. Deals that failed to form an agreement after the deadline, would be defined by auction between the two clubs; the club would submit their bid in a sealed envelope. Non-submission could lead to the rights being free to give to the opposite side. The mother club could also sell their rights to third parties, such as Emiliano Viviano in 2010 and Massimo Volta in 2007.

== Co-ownership ==
Date	Name	Co-owner (active)	Passive club (mother club)	Result	Fee
22 June 2012	Daniele Abbracciante	Parma	Frosinone	Renewed	—
20 June 2012	Francesco Acerbi	Chievo	Genoa	Genoa	€3.75M
23 June 2012	Pellegrino Albanese	Mantova	Sassuolo	Sassuolo	Auction, undisclosed
22 June 2012	Raffaele Alcibiade	Nocerina	Juventus	Juventus	Undisclosed
21 June 2012	Enrico Alfonso	Internazionale	Chievo	Internazionale	€1.1M (swap with Solini)
22 June 2012	Gabriele Angella	Udinese	Empoli	Renewed	—
23 June 2012	Mirco Antenucci	Torino	Catania	Catania	Auction, €1,112,000
23 June 2012	Marco Arcari	Cremonese	Atalanta	ND (Cremonese)	Free
21 June 2012	Francesco Ardizzone	Reggiana	Palermo	Reggiana	€500
23 June 2012	Rachid Arma (Morocco)	Vicenza	SPAL	SPAL	Auction, €84,115
23 June 2012	Ramzi Aya	Reggiana	Fiorentina	ND (Reggiana)	Free
21 June 2012	Loris Bacchetti	Sampdoria	Pescara	Pescara	€300,000 (swap with Martella)
22 June 2012	Alain Baclet (France)	Vicenza	Lecce	ND (Vicenza)	Free
23 June 2012	Andrea Bagnai	Carrarese	Fiorentina	ND (Carrarese)	Free
22 June 2012	Emanuele Bardelloni	Como	Brescia	ND (Como)	Free
22 June 2012	Francesco Bardi	Internazionale	Livorno	Internazionale	€4M
22 June 2012	Davide Bariti	Napoli	Vicenza	Napoli	€550,000 (swap with Sgambato)
22 June 2012	Daniele Baselli	Cittadella	Atalanta	Renewed	—
23 June 2012	Alessandro Bassoli	Chievo	Bologna	ND (Chievo)	Free
18 June 2012	Giacomo Bassoli	Cesena	Bologna	Renewed	—
22 June 2012	Alessandro Bastrini	Vicenza	Sampdoria	ND (Vicenza)	Free
22 June 2012	Luca Belcastro	Carrarese	Juventus	Renewed	—
22 June 2012	Nazzareno Belfasti	Juventus	Modena	Renewed	—
19 June 2012	Stefano Beltrame	Juventus	Novara	Juventus	€750,000 (€300,000 cash + 50% Libertazzi)
21 June 2012	Marco Benassi	Internazionale	Modena	Renewed	—
21 June 2012	Angelo Bencivenga	Pro Vercelli	Parma	Parma	Undisclosed (Note: Parma did not disclosed all the fee but received €166,000 (rounded up to the thousandth) co-ownership income from other minor players, which the income was from the increased value of either Tedeschi, Pisseri, Traoré, Bencivenga (originally €500 each).)
22 June 2012	Simone Benedetti	Internazionale	Torino	Renewed	—
21 June 2012	Alex Benvenga	Pisa	Varese	Varese	Undisclosed
21 June 2012	Luca Berardocco	Pisa	Pescara	Pescara	€500
6 June 2012	Giacomo Beretta	Genoa	Milan	Renewed	—
22 June 2012	Alessandro Bernardini	Livorno	Varese	Renewed	—
23 June 2012	Andrea Bertin	Mantova	Chievo	ND (Mantova)	Free
23 June 2012	Davide Bertoncini	Genoa	Piacenza	Genoa	Auction, €550
23 June 2012	Simone Bettati	Reggiana	Genoa	ND (Reggiana)	Free
21 June 2012	Raffaele Bianco	Spezia	Juventus	Juventus	Undisclosed
22 June 2012	Niko Bianconi	Juventus	Vicenza	Renewed	—
22 June 2012	Giacomo Bindi	Crotone	Genoa	Genoa	Undisclosed
23 June 2012	Francesco Bolzoni	Siena	Genoa	Siena	Auction, €425,000
23 June 2012	Marco Bonassi	Mantova	Juventus	ND (Mantova)	Free
20 June 2012	Edoardo Bonicelli	Cesena	Vicenza	Renewed	—
23 June 2012	Fabio Borini	Roma	Parma	Roma	Auction, €5.3M
23 June 2012	Daniel Bradaschia	Taranto	Udinese	ND (Taranto)	Free
22 June 2012	Oscar Branzani	Cittadella	Sampdoria	Renewed	—
21 June 2012	Nicolò Brighenti	Vicenza	Chievo	Renewed	—
22 June 2012	Riccardo Brosco	Pescara	Parma	Renewed	—
23 June 2012	Andrea Burato	Mantova	Chievo	ND (Mantova)	Free
23 June 2012	Salvatore Burrai	Latina	Cagliari	ND (Latina)	Free
18 June 2012	Kadir Caidi	Bologna	Cesena	Renewed	—
23 June 2012	Nebil Caidi	Pavia	Cesena	ND (Pavia)	Free
	Luca Caldirola	Cesena	Internazionale	Renewed	
22 June 2012	Tommaso Cancellotti	Pro Vercelli	Sampdoria	Renewed	—
	Marco Cane	Vigor Lamezia	Genoa		
19 June 2012	Manuel Canini	Internazionale	Cesena	Cesena	€500
	Nicola Canzian	SPAL	Atalanta		
22 June 2012	Andrea Caracciolo	Genoa	Brescia	Brescia	Auction, €200,000
	Riccardo Carlini	Reggiana	Genoa		
21 June 2012	Mirko Carretta	Benevento	Chievo	Renewed	—
	Gaetano Carrieri	Varese	Torino	ND (Varese)	
	Ignazio Carta	Latina	Cagliari		
5 June 2012	Giacomo Casoli	Spezia	Fiorentina	Spezia	Undisclosed
21 June 2012	Luca Castiglia	SPAL	Juventus	Juventus	Undisclosed
22 June 2012	Federico Cenerini	Giacomense	Chievo	Renewed	—
23 June 2012	Ricardo Chará (Colombia)	Empoli	Udinese	Udinese	Auction, undisclosed
22 June 2012	Francesco Checcucci	Crotone	Chievo	Renewed	—
1 June 2012	Matteo Chinellato	Milan	Genoa	Milan	€1.75M (swap with Pasini)
22 June 2012	Antonio Cibele	Melfi	Catania	ND (Melfi)	Free
22 June 2012	Antonio Cinelli	Sassuolo	Lazio	Lazio	€30,000
21 June 2012	Lorenzo Cinque	Mantova	Lazio	Lazio	Undisclosed
23 June 2012	Enrico Citro	Avellino	Roma	ND (Avellino)	Free
24 June 2012	Andrea Cocco	AlbinoLeffe	Cagliari	AlbinoLeffe	€50,000
15 June 2012	Gianmario Comi	Milan	Torino	Renewed	—
22 June 2012	Fabio Concas	Carpi	Varese	Carpi	Undisclosed
21 June 2012	Sergio Contessa	Andria	Novara	Andria	Undisclosed
19 June 2012	Sacha Cori	Carrarese	Cesena	Cesena	€200,000
21 June 2012	Elia Cortesi	Carpi	Atalanta	Renewed	—
22 June 2012	Marco Crimi	Grosseto	Bari	Renewed	—
22 June 2012	Lorenzo Crisetig	Parma	Internazionale	Renewed	—
21 June 2012	Roberto Crivello	San Marino	Juventus	Renewed	—
22 June 2012	Gaetano D'Agostino	Siena	Udinese	ND (Siena)	
22 June 2012	Matteo D'Alessandro	Reggina	Genoa	Renewed	—
14 June 2012	Loris Damonte	Varese	Genoa	Renewed	—
22 June 2012	Domenico Danti	Vicenza	Siena	ND (Vicenza)	Free
20 June 2012	Matteo Darmian	Palermo	Milan	Palermo	€500,000
21 June 2012	Alessandro De Leidi	Foggia	Atalanta	Atalanta	Undisclosed
	Caio De Cenco	Bellaria	Cesena		
	Lorenzo Degeri	Cremonese	Internazionale	Renewed	
22 June 2012	Andrea De Paola	Carpi	Juventus	Renewed	—
	Andrea De Vito	Cittadella	Milan		
22 June 2012	Luca Del Papa	Juventus	Pescara	Renewed	—
21 June 2012	Simone Dell'Agnello	Livorno	Internazionale	Livorno	€1.25M
21 June 2012	Paolo Hernán Dellafiore	Novara	Parma	Parma	€250,000
21 June 2012	Francesco Della Rocca	Palermo	Bologna	Renewed	—
22 June 2012	Samuel Di Carmine	Cittadella	Fiorentina	ND (Cittadella)	
21 June 2012	Gianluca Di Chiara	Palermo	Reggiana	Palermo	€200,000
21 June 2012	Matteo Di Gennaro	Parma	Ascoli	Renewed	—
22 June 2012	Matteo Di Piazza	Pro Vercelli	Chievo	Pro Vercelli	Undisclosed
	Jacopo Dezi	Napoli	Giulianova		
23 June 2012	Alessandro Diamanti	Bologna	Brescia	Bologna	Auction, undisclosed
21 June 2012	Milan Đurić (Bosnia and Herzegovina)	Parma	Cesena	Renewed	—
	Nicolao Dumitru	Napoli	Empoli		
8 June 2012	Stephan El Shaarawy	Milan	Genoa	Milan	€10M (€5M cash + Merkel)
22 June 2012	Albin Ekdal (Sweden)	Cagliari	Juventus	Juventus	€1.2M
22 June 2012	Mirko Eramo	Crotone	Sampdoria	Renewed	—
22 June 2012	Andrea Esposito	Genoa	Lecce	Lecce	Undisclosed
	Carmine Esposito	Campobasso	Juventus		
22 June 2012	Simone Esposito	Grosseto	Juventus	Renewed	—
21 June 2012	Umberto Eusepi	Varese	Genoa	Varese	Undisclosed
19 June 2012	Mattia Evangelisti	Cesena	Vicenza	Vicenza	€225,000 (exchanged with Righini)
21 June 2012	Thomas Fabbri	Parma	Cesena	Renewed	—
21 June 2012	Marcello Falzerano	Avellino	Chievo	Chievo	Undisclosed
21 June 2012	Simone Fantoni	Brescia	Entella	Renewed	—
	Simone Fautario	Como	Internazionale	Como	
22 June 2012	Nicola Ferrari	Foligno	Sassuolo	Sassuolo	Undisclosed
	Vittorio Ferrero	San Marino	Juventus		
21 June 2012	Luca Ferri	Cuneo	AlbinoLeffe	AlbinoLeffe	Undisclosed
	Jacopo Fiorucci	Melfi	Chievo		
21 June 2012	Filippo Fondi	Lumezzane	Chievo	Chievo	Undisclosed
23 June 2012	Giovanni Formiconi	Grosseto	Udinese	Grosseto	Auction, undisclosed
	Valerio Frasca	Pro Patria	Roma		
22 June 2012	Lorenzo Galassi	Pavia	Novara	Novara	Undisclosed
22 June 2012	Jacopo Galimberti	Parma	Internazionale	Renewed	—
11 June 2012	Mattia Gallon	Treviso	Cagliari	Cagliari	Undisclosed
21 June 2012	Luca Garritano	Cesena	Internazionale	Renewed	—
22 June 2012	Andrea Gasparri	Fondi	Parma	Fondi	€500,000
21 June 2012	Leonardo Gatto	Pisa	Atalanta	Renewed	—
23 June 2012	Alberto Gerbo	Gubbio	Internazionale	ND (Gubbio)	Free
23 June 2012	Luca Ghiringhelli	SPAL	Milan	Milan	Auction, €10,000
19 June 2012	Emanuele Giaccherini	Juventus	Cesena	Juventus	€4.25M
22 June 2012	Nicolas Giani	Vicenza	Internazionale	ND (Vicenza)	Free
22 June 2012	Matteo Giglio	Andria	Vicenza	ND (Andria)	
11 June 2012	Daniele Giorico	Treviso	Cagliari	Cagliari	Undisclosed
23 June 2012	Giuseppe Giovinco	Carrarese	Juventus	ND (Carrarese)	Free
21 June 2012	Sebastian Giovinco	Parma	Juventus	Juventus	€11M
23 June 2012	Marco Giovio	Grosseto	Palermo	ND (Grosseto)	Free
23 June 2012	Domenico Girardi	Taranto	Chievo	ND (Taranto)	Free
23 June 2012	Michael Girasole	AlbinoLeffe	Atalanta	ND (AlbinoLeffe)	Free
22 June 2012	Kamil Glik (Poland)	Torino	Palermo	Renewed	—
23 June 2012	Massimo Gotti	Ternana	Udinese	Ternana	Auction, undisclosed
18 June 2012	Angelo Gregorio	Bologna	Cesena	Renewed	—
	Nicolás Gorobsov	Torino	Vicenza		
22 June 2012	Robert Gucher (Austria)	Genoa	Frosinone	Frosinone	€500
18 June 2012	Përparim Hetemaj (Finland)	Chievo	Brescia	Chievo	€800,000
22 June 2012	Carlo Ilari	Juventus	Ascoli	Renewed	—
18 June 2012	Ciro Immobile	Genoa	Juventus	Renewed	—
22 June 2012	Giuseppe Iuliano	Pro Patria	Napoli	Renewed	—
23 June 2012	Antimo Iunco	Spezia	Chievo	Chievo	Auction, €750
22 June 2012	Armando Izzo	Avellino	Napoli	Renewed	—
22 June 2012	Enej Jelenič (Slovenia)	Padova	Genoa	Padova	Undisclosed
23 June 2012	Houssine Kharja (Morocco)	Fiorentina	Genoa	ND (Fiorentina)	Free
22 June 2012	Eloge Koffi Yao (Ivory Coast)	Internazionale	Parma	Renewed	—
21 June 2012	Rene Krhin (Slovenia)	Bologna	Internazionale	Renewed	
22 June 2012	Juraj Kucka (Slovakia)	Internazionale	Genoa	Genoa	€6.5M (part of Longo)
23 June 2012	Davide Lanzafame	Catania	Palermo	ND (Catania)	Free
23 June 2012	Nicola Lanzolla	Pisa	Catania	ND (Pisa)	Free
22 June 2012	Dejan Lazarevic (Slovenia)	Padova	Genoa	Genoa	Undisclosed
23 June 2012	Andrea Lazzari	Fiorentina	Cagliari	Fiorentina	Auction, €1.638M
22 June 2012	Flavio Lazzari	Empoli	Udinese	ND (Empoli)	Free
22 June 2012	Fabio Lebran	AlbinoLeffe	Parma	Parma	€200,000
21 June 2012	Marko Livaja (Croatia)	Internazionale	Cesena	Renewed	—
5 June 2012	Lorenzo Lollo	Spezia	Fiorentina	Spezia	Undisclosed
21 June 2012	Alessandro Longhi	Sassuolo	Chievo	Renewed	—
22 June 2012	Samuele Longo	Genoa	Internazionale	Internazionale	€7M (Kucka + €0.5M)
22 June 2012	Alessio Luciani	Lumezzane	Lazio	Lazio	Undisclosed
18 June 2012	Jacopo Luppi	Cesena	Bologna	Renewed	—
18 June 2012	Luca Maccabiti	Lumezzane	Brescia	Renewed	—
23 June 2012	Giovanni Madiotto	Treviso	Chievo	ND (Treviso)	Free
22 June 2012	Alessandro Malomo	AlbinoLeffe	Roma	Roma	€100,000
21 June 2012	Dario Maltese	Viareggio	Palermo	Renewed	—
22 June 2012	Matteo Mandorlini	Brescia	Parma	Renewed	—
	Andrea Manfredi	Valenzana	Genoa		
22 June 2012	Riccardo Maniero	Pescara	Juventus	Renewed	—
	Daniele Mannini	Siena	Napoli		
22 June 2012	Jacopo Mantovani	Renate	Bologna	ND (Renate)	
22 June 2012	Diego Manzoni	Genoa	Parma	Renewed	—
	Andrea Marafioti	Valenzana	Genoa		
	Mattia Maragna	Gavorrano	Chievo		
23 June 2012	Alessandro Marchi	Bologna	Piacenza	ND (Bologna)	Free
22 June 2012	Mattia Marchi	Pavia	Novara	Novara	Undisclosed
23 June 2012	Michele Marconi	SPAL	Atalanta	ND (SPAL)	Free
23 June 2012	Antonio Marino	Reggina	Udinese	ND (Reggina)	Free
22 June 2012	Piergiuseppe Maritato	Vicenza	Fiorentina	ND (Vicenza)	Free
21 June 2012	Bruno Martella	Sampdoria	Pescara	Sampdoria	€300,000 (swap with Bacchetti)
23 June 2012	Alberto Masi	Pro Vercelli	Sampdoria	Pro Vercelli	Auction, €421,000
23 June 2012	Federico Masi	Bari	Fiorentina	ND (Bari)	Free
23 June 2012	Andrea Masiello	Atalanta	Bari	ND (Atalanta)	Free (suspension)
23 June 2012	Emiliano Massimo	Avellino	Roma	ND (Avellino)	Free
23 June 2012	Antonio Mazzotta	Lecce	Palermo	ND (Lecce)	Free
22 June 2012	Riccardo Meggiorini	Torino	Genoa	Torino	€600,000
22 June 2012	Diego Mella	Parma	Internazionale	Renewed	—
22 June 2012	Ledian Memushaj (Albania)	Carpi	Chievo	Carpi	Undisclosed
21 June 2012	Antonio Meola	Livorno	Avellino	Livorno	Undisclosed
22 June 2012	Matteo Merini	Carrarese	Chievo	Renewed	—
8 June 2012	Alexander Merkel (Kazakhstan)	Genoa	Milan	Genoa	€5M (part of El Shaarawy)
23 June 2012	Ivan Merli Sala	Lecco	Chievo	ND (Lecco)	Free
20 June 2012	Mirko Miceli	Alessandria	Varese	Varese	Undisclosed
21 June 2012	Mattia Migani	San Marino	Palermo	San Marino	€1,000
	Andrea Migliorini	SPAL	Livorno		
23 June 2012	Luca Miracoli	Valenzana	Genoa	Valenzana	Auction, undisclosed
22 June 2012	Gianvito Misuraca	Vicenza	Palermo	ND (Vicenza)	Free
23 June 2012	Matteo Momentè	Varese	AlbinoLeffe	ND (Varese)	Free
22 June 2012	Michel Morganella (Switzerland)	Novara	Palermo	Palermo	€1.5M (part of González)
22 June 2012	Daniele Mori	Udinese	Empoli	Renewed	—
22 June 2012	Takayuki Morimoto (Japan)	Novara	Catania	Catania	€1.5M (€200,000 + Košický)
22 June 2012	Felice Natalino	Internazionale	Genoa	ND (Internazionale)	Free
22 June 2012	Davide Negretti	Cuneo	Sampdoria	ND (Cuneo)	Free
22 June 2012	Maikol Negro	Nocerina	Catania	Renewed	—
22 June 2012	Davide Nocciola	Pro Vercelli	Chievo	Pro Vercelli	Undisclosed
22 June 2012	Nwankwo (Nigeria)	Parma	Internazionale	Renewed	—
14 June 2012	Wilfred Osuji (Nigeria)	Padova	Milan	Renewed	—
22 June 2012	Emanuele Padella	Grosseto	Parma	Renewed	—
23 June 2012	Cosmo Palumbo	Monza	Napoli	ND (Monza)	Free
21 June 2012	Luigi Palumbo	Cesena	Parma	Renewed	—
22 June 2012	Francesco Pambianchi	SPAL	Parma	Parma	Free (bankruptcy)
23 June 2012	Jurgen Pandiani	Alessandria	Atalanta	ND (Alessandria)	Free
23 June 2012	Andrea Paolucci	Cittadella	Fiorentina	ND (Cittadella)	Free
22 June 2012	Gabriele Paonessa	Parma	Bologna	ND (Parma)	Free
22 June 2012	Salvatore Papa	Foligno	Chievo	Chievo	Undisclosed
22 June 2012	Daniele Paponi	Bologna	Parma	ND (Bologna)	Free
1 June 2012	Nicola Pasini	Genoa	Milan	Genoa	€1.65M (swap with Chinellato)
22 June 2012	Marco Pavanello	Giacomense	Chievo	Renewed	—
	Thomas Pedrabissi	Cesena	Internazionale	Renewed	
22 June 2012	Daniele Pedrelli	Spezia	Internazionale	ND (Spezia)	
22 June 2012	Cristian Pedrinelli	Parma	Brescia	Renewed	—
1 June 2012	Pelé (Portugal)	Milan	Genoa	Milan	€900,000 (swap with Sampirisi)
	Enrico Pepe	Paganese	Siena		
24 June 2012	Gabriele Perico	Cagliari	AlbinoLeffe	Cagliari	€200,000
21 June 2012	Riccardo Perpetuini	Foggia	Lazio	Lazio	Undisclosed
22 June 2012	Makris Petrozzi	Pergocrema	Parma	Parma	Free
23 June 2012	Alessio Petti	Foligno	Cesena	Foligno	Free (exchanged with Tattini)
22 June 2012	Antonio Piccolo	Livorno	Piacenza	ND (Livorno)	Free (bankruptcy)
22 June 2012	Carlo Pinsoglio	Vicenza	Juventus	Renewed	—
23 June 2012	Mattia Piras	SPAL	Genoa	ND (SPAL)	Free
4 June 2012	Matteo Pisseri	Renate	Parma	Parma	Undisclosed
22 June 2012	Mattia Proietti	Bassano	Juventus	Renewed	—
23 June 2012	Gabriele Puccio	Pavia	Internazionale	ND (Pavia)	Free
21 June 2012	Raffaele Pucino	Varese	Alessandria	Varese	Undisclosed
22 June 2012	Niccolò Pupeschi	Perugia	Empoli	Perugia	Auction, undisclosed
23 June 2012	Sorin Rădoi (Romania)	Pavia	Siena	ND (Pavia)	Free
21 June 2012	Riccardo Ragni	Andria	Pescara	Renewed	—
21 June 2012	Vasco Regini	Sampdoria	Empoli	Renewed	—
23 June 2012	Cesare Rickler	Bologna	Chievo	ND (Bologna)	Free
19 June 2012	Luca Righini	Vicenza	Cesena	Cesena	€225,000 (exchanged with Evangelisti)
19 June 2012	Federico Rodríguez (Uruguay)	Bologna	Genoa	Renewed	—
14 June 2012	Simone Romagnoli	Pescara	Milan	Renewed	—
21 June 2012	Dario Romano	Alessandria	Juventus	Renewed	—
23 June 2012	Roberto Romeo	Catanzaro	Reggina	ND (Catanzaro)	Free
22 June 2012	Marco Romizi	Bari	Fiorentina	Renewed	—
23 June 2012	Giovanni Rossi	SPAL	Cesena	ND (SPAL)	Free
21 June 2012	Marco Rossi	Cesena	Parma	Renewed	—
22 June 2012	Jonathan Rossini (Switzerland)	Udinese	Sampdoria	Renewed	—
21 June 2012	Danilo Russo	Spezia	Genoa	Spezia	Undisclosed
21 June 2012	Francesco Sabatucci	Lumezzane	Chievo	Renewed	—
1 June 2012	Mario Sampirisi	Genoa	Milan	Genoa	€1M (swap with Pelé)
11 June 2012	Giovanni Luigi Sanna	Treviso	Cagliari	Cagliari	Undisclosed
22 June 2012	Gianluca Sansone	Sassuolo	Siena	Sassuolo	€425,000
23 June 2012	Alessandro Scialpi	Varese	Lecce	ND (Varese)	Free
21 June 2012	Matteo Serlini	Brescia	Entella	Renewed	—
23 June 2012	Jaime Serrano (Spain)	Varese	Internazionale	ND (Varese)	Free
22 June 2012	Federico Sevieri	Lumezzane	Lazio	Renewed	—
21 June 2012	Luca Siligardi	Livorno	Internazionale	Livorno	€1.25M
21 June 2012	Marco Silvestri	Chievo	Modena	Chievo	€150,000
23 June 2012	Tommaso Silvestri	Casale	Juventus	ND (Casale)	Free
22 June 2012	Simone Simeri	Melfi	Napoli	Renewed	—
23 June 2012	Alex Sirri	Giacomense	Chievo	ND (Giacomense)	Free
21 June 2012	Matteo Solini	Internazionale	Chievo	Chievo	€1.1M (swap with Alfonso)
13 June 2012	Frederik Sørensen (Denmark)	Bologna	Juventus	Renewed	—
23 June 2012	Stefano Spagna	Montichiari	Chievo	ND (Montichiari)	Free
14 June 2012	David Speziale	Lecce	Milan	Renewed	—
22 June 2012	Marco Sportiello	Poggibonsi	Atalanta	Atalanta	Undisclosed
23 June 2012	Tommaso Squillace	Catanzaro	Reggina	Catanzaro	Auction, undisclosed
22 June 2012	Alen Stevanović (Serbia)	Torino	Internazionale	Renewed	—
23 June 2012	Lorenzo Tafi	Borgo-a-Buggiano	Fiorentina	ND (Borgo-a-Buggiano)	Free
13 June 2012	Saphir Sliti Taïder (France)	Juventus	Bologna	Bologna	€2.35M
23 June 2012	Andrea Talignani	Entella	Parma	ND (Entella)	Free
21 June 2012	Zsolt Tamási (Hungary)	Ascoli	Parma	Renewed	—
21 June 2012	Lorenzo Tassi	Brescia	Internazionale	Renewed	—
22 June 2012	Marco Tattini	Foligno	Cesena	Cesena	€500 (exchanged with Petti)
22 June 2012	Luca Tedeschi	Crotone	Parma	Parma	Undisclosed
22 June 2012	Leonardo Terigi	Crotone	Genoa	Renewed	—
22 June 2012	Pietro Terracciano	Catania	Nocerina	Renewed	—
23 June 2012	Mame Baba Thiam (Senegal)	Internazionale	Sassuolo	ND (Internazionale)	Free
22 June 2012	Fernando Tissone (Argentina)	Sampdoria	Udinese	Sampdoria	€100,000
22 June 2012	Antonio Tognarelli	Carrarese	Empoli	Empoli	Undisclosed
22 June 2012	Davide Tonani	Pro Vercelli	Chievo	Chievo	Undisclosed
20 June 2012	Simone Tonelli	Vicenza	Cesena	Renewed	—
20 June 2012	Denis Tonucci	Vicenza	Cesena	Cesena	€650,000 (exchanged with Tulli)
22 June 2012	Kevin Trocar	Carrarese	Livorno	ND (Carrarese)	
19 June 2012	Andrea Tozzo	Sampdoria	Verona	Renewed	—
23 June 2012	Mohamed Traoré (Guinea)	Foggia	Parma	Foggia	Auction, undisclosed
23 June 2012	Alessandro Tuia	Foligno	Lazio	Lazio	Auction, undisclosed
20 June 2012	Giacomo Tulli	Cesena	Vicenza	Vicenza	€650,000 (exchanged with Tonucci)
22 June 2012	Samir Ujkani (Albania) (Kosovo)	Novara	Palermo	Palermo	€1.5M (part of González)
22 June 2012	Orazio Urso	Milazzo	Catania	ND (Milazzo)	Free
22 June 2012	Ronny Valerio	Renate	Parma	ND (Renate)	Free
19 June 2012	Mattia Valoti	Milan	AlbinoLeffe	Renewed	—
22 June 2012	Alessandro Vecchi	SPAL	Parma	Parma	Free (bankruptcy)
18 June 2012	Enrico Verachi	Siracusa	Cagliari	Cagliari	Undisclosed
15 June 2012	Simone Verdi	Torino	Milan	Renewed	—
22 June 2012	Andrea Vignali	Mantova	Sassuolo	ND (Mantova)	Free
21 June 2012	Marco Villanova	San Marino	Atalanta	Renewed	—
15 June 2012	Kevin Vinetot (France)	Genoa	Crotone	Renewed	—
22 June 2012	Nicolas Viola	Palermo	Reggina	Renewed	—
22 June 2012	Simone Vitale	Frosinone	Pescara	ND (Frosinone)	Free
22 June 2012	Emiliano Viviano	Palermo	Internazionale	Renewed	—
22 June 2012	Francesco Volpe	Piacenza	Livorno	ND (Piacenza)	Free (bankruptcy)
23 June 2012	Francesco Zampano	Entella	Sampdoria	Entella	Auction, €276,000
23 June 2012	Davide Zappacosta	Atalanta	Isola Liri	Atalanta	Auction, undisclosed
22 June 2012	Giacomo Zappacosta	Barletta	Pescara	ND (Barletta)	Free
22 June 2012	Zdeněk Zlámal (Czech Republic)	Bari	Udinese	Udinese	Undisclosed
