= List of Italian football transfers summer 2011 (June) =

This is a list of Italian football transfers for the 2011–12 season. Only moves from Serie A and Serie B are listed. The summer transfer window began from 1 July 2011, the end of the 2010–11 season, with a few transfers taking place prior to the season's complete end.

== Summer transfer window ==
=== June ===
Date	Name	Nationality	Moving from	Moving to	Fee
2010-08-31^{1}	Marco Borriello	Italy	Milan	Roma	€10M
2010-09-13^{1}	Matija Nastasić	Serbia	(Serbia) Partizan	Fiorentina	€4M
2010-12-21	Federico Fernández	Argentina	(Argentina) Estudiantes LP	Napoli	€2.823M
21 January 2011^{1}	Zé Eduardo	Brazil	(Brazil) Santos (via Lugano)	Genoa	€5.4M
28 January 2011^{1}	Carlos Labrín	Chile	(Chile) Huachipato	Palermo	€1.3M
2011-02-24^{1}	Milan Milanović	Serbia	(Russia) Lokomotiv Moscow	Palermo	€1.5M commission + €0.27M training compensation
2011-03-04^{1}	Luc Castaignos	Netherlands	(Netherlands) Feyenoord	Internazionale	Undisclosed
2011-03-10^{1}	Marco Dalla Costa	Italy	Caratese (amateur)	Novara	Free
2011-03-22^{1}	Alessio Briglia	Italy	Bellaria	Cesena	Undisclosed
2011-04-07^{1}	Moestafa El Kabir	Morocco	(Sweden) Mjällby	Cagliari	Loan, €475,000
2011-04-20^{1}	Paolo Rozzio	Italy	Canavese	Fiorentina	€0.25M
2011-05-05^{1}	Fabio Borini	Italy	(England) Chelsea	Parma	Free (€0.36M training compensation)
2011-05-09^{1}	Philippe Mexès	France	Roma	Milan	Free
2011-05-09^{1}	Taye Taiwo	Nigeria	(France) Marseille	Milan	Free
2011-05-19^{1}	Edinson Cavani	Uruguay	Palermo	Napoli	€12M
2011-05-22	Diego Ângelo	Brazil	Genoa	(Turkey) Eskişehirspor	Undisclosed (to Naval)
2011-05-24	Kévin Constant	Guinea	(France) Châteauroux	Chievo	Undisclosed
24 May 2011^{1}	Andrea Pirlo	Italy	Milan	Juventus	Free (€1.164M commission)
24 May 2011	Marco Amelia	Italy	Genoa	Milan	€3.5M
24 May 2011	Sokratis Papastathopoulos	Greece	Milan	Genoa	€13M
26 May 2011^{1}	Reto Ziegler	Switzerland	Sampdoria	Juventus	Free
27 May 2011	Giacomo Zappacosta	Italy	Pescara	Barletta	Co-ownership, €250
1 June 2011	Rafinha	Brazil	Genoa	(Germany) Bayern Munich	€5.75M
8 June 2011	Miroslav Klose	Germany	(Germany) Bayern Munich	Lazio	Free
8 June 2011	Dídac Vilà	Spain	Milan	(Spain) Espanyol	Loan
8 June 2011^{1}	Eros Pisano	Italy	Varese	Palermo	€1.85M
8 June 2011^{1}	Ádám Simon	Hungary	(Hungary) Haladás	Palermo	€0.98M
8 June 2011	Željko Brkić	Serbia	Vojvodina (Serbia)	Udinese	Undisclosed
2011-06-11	Mourad Meghni	Algeria	Lazio	(Qatar) Umm-Salal	Free
2011-06-13	Francesco Tavano	Italy	Livorno	Empoli	Free
13 June 2011	Adam Kokoszka	Poland	Empoli	(Poland) Polonia Warsaw	Undisclosed
13 June 2011	Danilo	Brazil	(Brazil) Desportivo Brasil (& Palmeiras)	Udinese	Undisclosed
14 June 2011	Vincenzo Rennella	France	Genoa	Cesena	Loan, €237,500
14 June 2011	Mauro Cetto	Argentina	(France) Toulouse	Palermo	Free (€0.45M commission)
2011-06-15	Milan Đurić	Bosnia & Herzegovina	Parma	Crotone	Loan
15 June 2011	Andreas Granqvist	Sweden	(Netherlands) Groningen	Genoa	€4.45M
16 June 2011	Kevin Vinetot	France	Crotone	Genoa	Co-ownership, €1M
16 June 2011	Leonardo Terigi	Italy	Genoa	Crotone	Co-ownership, €50,000
16 June 2011	Michele Pazienza	Italy	Napoli	Juventus	Free (€0.3M commission)
16 June 2011	Senad Lulić	Bosnia & Herzegovina	(Switzerland) Young Boys	Lazio	€3.251M
2011-06-17	Filippo Fracaro	Italy	Chievo	Bassano	?
17 June 2011	Osarimen Ebagua	Nigeria	Varese	Torino	Co-ownership, €1.4M
c. 17 June 2011	Gaetano Carrieri	Italy	Torino	Varese	co-ownership, €200,000
18 June 2011	Zlatan Ibrahimović	Sweden	(Spain) Barcelona	Milan	€24M
20 June 2011	Victor Obinna	Nigeria	Internazionale	(Russia) Lokomotiv Moscow	Free
20 June 2011	Jacopo Dezi	Italy	Giulianova	Napoli (youth)	Co-ownership, €20,000
20 June 2011	Nicolao Dumitru	Italy	Empoli	Napoli	Co-ownership, €1.5M
20 June 2011	Michele Franco	Italy	Como	Padova	Free
21 June 2011	Luca Tomasig	Italy	Reggiana	AlbinoLeffe	Co-ownership, Undisclosed
21 June 2011	Gabriele Perico	Italy	AlbinoLeffe	Cagliari	Co-ownership, €375,000
22 June 2011	Marco Silvestri	Italy	Modena	Chievo	Co-ownership, €300,000
2011-06-22	Mamadou Conte	Guinea	Genoa	Reggiana (youth)	Co-ownership, Undisclosed
22 June 2011	Alessandro Matri	Italy	Cagliari	Juventus	€15.5M
22 June 2011	Fabio Quagliarella	Italy	Napoli	Juventus	€10.5M
22 June 2011	Simone Pepe	Italy	Udinese	Juventus	€7.5M
22 June 2011	Marco Motta	Italy	Udinese	Juventus	€3.75M
22 June 2011	Stephan El Shaarawy	Italy	Genoa	Milan	Co-ownership, €10M (€5M + Merkel)
22 June 2011	Alexander Merkel	Germany	Milan	Genoa	Co-ownership, €5M (part of El Shaarawy)
22 June 2011	Sebastian Giovinco	Italy	Juventus	Parma	Co-ownership, €3M
22 June 2011	Francesco Bolzoni	Italy	Genoa	Siena	Co-ownership, €1.05M
23 June 2011	Adrian Mutu	Romania	Fiorentina	Cesena	Free
2011-06-23	Eros Schiavon	Italy	Portogruaro	Cittadella	Undisclosed
2011-06-23	Mirko Eramo	Italy	Sampdoria	Crotone	Co-ownership, Undisclosed
23 June 2011	Marco Donadel	Italy	Fiorentina	Napoli	Free
23 June 2011	Gonçalo Brandão	Portugal	Siena	Parma	Loan
23 June 2011	Ângelo	Brazil	Parma	Siena	€2.5M (part of Galloppa)
2011-06-23	Alessio Campagnacci	Italy	Giulianova	Reggina	Undisclosed
23 June 2011	Rachid Arma	Morocco	Vicenza	SPAL	Loan (between co-owner)
23 June 2011	Nicolò Brighenti	Italy	Chievo	Viareggio	Co-ownership, €30,000
23 June 2011	Raffaele Schiavi	Italy	Lecce	Vicenza	€0.75M (swap with Brivio)
24 June 2011	Matteo Mandorlini	Italy	Parma	Brescia	Co-ownership, €1.5M (swap with Pedrinelli)
24 June 2011	Cristian Pedrinelli	Italy	Brescia	Parma	Co-ownership, €1.5M (swap with M.Mandorlini)
24 June 2011	Kevin Trocar	Italy	Livorno	Carrarese	Co-ownership, Undisclosed
24 June 2011	Marco Rossi	Italy	Parma	Cesena	Co-ownership, €2M
2011-06-24	Filippo Fondi	Italy	Foligno	Chievo	Undisclosed
24 June 2011	Federico Rodríguez	Uruguay	Genoa	Bologna	Co-ownership, €3M (swap with Meggiorini)
24 June 2011	Marco Tattini	Italy	Cesena	Foligno	Co-ownership, €500
2011-06-24	Cristian Suarino	Italy	Catania	Nocerina	Loan
2011-06-24	Pietro Terracciano	Italy	Nocerina	Catania	Co-ownership, Undisclosed
24 June 2011	Nwankwo	Nigeria	Internazionale (youth)	Parma	Co-ownership, €0.3M
24 June 2011	Daniele Abbracciante	Italy	Frosinone (youth)	Parma (youth)	Co-ownership, €250,000
24 June 2011	Jonathan Biabiany	France	Sampdoria	Parma	Loan
24 June 2011	Andrea Rispoli	Italy	Parma	Sampdoria	Loan
24 June 2011	Paolo Castellini	Italy	Parma	Sampdoria	Loan
24 June 2011	Andrea Bertolacci	Italy	Lecce	Roma	Co-ownership counter-option, €500,000
24 June 2011	Alessandro Crescenzi	Italy	Crotone	Roma	co-ownership counter-option, €175,000
24 June 2011	Enrico Verachi	Italy	Cagliari	Siracusa	Co-ownership, Undisclosed (part of Mancosu)
24 June 2011	Domenico Danti	Italy	Siena	Vicenza	Co-ownership, €425,000 (part of Sestu)
27 June 2011	Luca Siligardi	Italy	Bologna	Internazionale	co-ownership counter-option, €600,000
27 June 2011	Giordano Maccarone	Italy	Catania	Milazzo	Co-ownership, €250
27 June 2011	Andrea D'Amico	Italy	Catania	Milazzo	Co-ownership, €250
27 June 2011	Antonino Ragusa	Italy	Genoa	Reggina	Loan, Free
27 June 2011	Domenico Criscito	Italy	Genoa	(Russia) Zenit	€10M
28 June 2011	Cesare Rickler	Italy	Chievo	Bologna	Co-ownership, €1.5M (swap with A.Bassoli)
28 June 2011	Alessandro Bassoli	Italy	Bologna	Chievo	Co-ownership, €1.5M (swap with Rickler)
28 June 2011	Nico Pulzetti	Italy	Livorno	Bologna	€3.3M (€1.65M + Regno)
28 June 2011	Riccardo Regno	Italy	Bologna	Livorno	€1.65M (part of Pulzetti)
28 June 2011	Samuele Longo	Italy	Internazionale (youth)	Genoa	Co-ownership, €500
2011-06-28^{1}	Andrea Bertin	Italy	Chievo	Mantova	Co-ownership, Undisclosed
2011-06-28^{1}	Andrea Burato	Italy	Chievo	Mantova	Co-ownership, Undisclosed
28 June 2011	Eran Zahavi	Israel	(Israel) Hapoel Tel Aviv	Palermo	€1.675M
28 June 2011^{1}	Sorin Rădoi	Romania	Santarcangelo	Siena	€55,000
28 June 2011^{1}	Sorin Rădoi	Romania	Siena	Pavia	Co-ownership, €500
28 June 2011	Oguchi Onyewu	United States	Milan	(Portugal) Sporting CP	Free
29 June 2011	Kadir Caidi	Italy	Cesena	Bologna	Co-ownership, €0.75M (swap with Luppi)
29 June 2011	Jacopo Luppi	Italy	Bologna (youth)	Cesena	Co-ownership, €0.75M (swap with Caidi)
29 June 2011	Angelo Gregorio	Italy	Cesena (youth)	Bologna	Co-ownership, €1M (swap with G.Bassoli)
29 June 2011	Giacomo Bassoli	Italy	Bologna	Cesena	Co-ownership, €1M (swap with Gregorio)
29 June 2011	Aleksejs Giļničs	Latvia	(Sweden) Athletic FC	Cesena	Loan
2011-06-29	Ferdinando Vitofrancesco	Italy	Cremonese	Cittadella	Undisclosed
29 June 2011	Daniel Semenzato	Italy	Cittadella	Cremonese	Undisclosed
29 June 2011	Rômulo	Brazil	(Brazil) Cruzeiro	Fiorentina	€2.5M
29 June 2011	Diego Manzoni	Italy	Parma	Genoa	Co-ownership, €1.7M
29 June 2011	Michelangelo Albertazzi	Italy	Milan (youth)	(Spain) Getafe	Loan
29 June 2011^{1}	Loïc Nego	France	(France) Nantes	Roma	Free (€0.14M other cost)
30 June 2011	Zsolt Tamási	Hungary	Parma	Ascoli	Co-ownership, €1.7M (swap with M.Di Gennaro)
30 June 2011	Matteo Di Gennaro	Italy	Ascoli	Parma	Co-ownership, €1.7M (swap with Tamási)
30 June 2011	Jean-François Gillet	Belgium	Bari	Bologna	€1.36M
30 June 2011	Eugenio Lamanna	Italy	Genoa	Bari	Loan, Free
30 June 2011	Luigi Palumbo	Italy	Parma	Cesena	Co-ownership, €1M (swap with T.Fabbri)
30 June 2011	Thomas Fabbri	Italy	Cesena	Parma	Co-ownership, €1M (swap with (L.Palumbo)
30 June 2011	Edoardo Bonicelli	Italy	Vicenza (youth)	Cesena (youth)	Co-ownership, €0.6M (swap with S.Tonelli)
30 June 2011	Simone Tonelli	Italy	Cesena	Vicenza	Co-ownership, €0.6M (swap with Bonicelli)
30 June 2011	Perparim Hetemaj	Finland	Brescia	Chievo	Co-ownership, €1.4M
30 June 2011	Samuel Di Carmine	Italy	Frosinone	Cittadella	€500 (co-ownership with Fiorentina)
30 June 2011	Guilherme Siqueira	Brazil	Udinese	(Spain) Granada	Free
30 June 2011	Mattia Destro	Italy	Internazionale	Genoa	€4.5M (Part of Ranocchia deal)
30 June 2011	Yuto Nagatomo	Japan	Cesena	Internazionale	€10.5M
30 June 2011	Luca Caldirola	Italy	Internazionale	Cesena	Co-ownership, €2.5M (part of Nagatomo)
30 June 2011	Luca Garritano	Italy	Internazionale (youth)	Cesena (youth)	Co-ownership, €0.7M (part of Nagatomo)
30 June 2011	Francesco Bardi	Italy	Livorno (youth)	Internazionale (youth)	Co-ownership, €1.35M (cash + Dell'Agnello & Siligardi)
30 June 2011	Simone Dell'Agnello	Italy	Internazionale (youth)	Livorno	Co-ownership, €0.5M (part of Bardi)
30 June 2011	Nenad Tomović	Serbia	Genoa	Lecce	Loan, €400,000
30 June 2011	Simone Verdi	Italy	Milan (youth)	Torino	Co-ownership, €2.5M (Comi + €150,000 cash)
30 June 2011	Gianmario Comi	Italy	Torino (youth)	Milan	Co-ownership, €2.35M
30 June 2011	Antonio Rosati	Italy	Lecce	Napoli	€3M
30 June 2011	Blerim Džemaili	Switzerland	Parma	Napoli	€9M
30 June 2011	Manuele Blasi	Italy	Napoli	Parma	Free
30 June 2011	Fabiano Santacroce	Italy	Napoli	Parma	Loan
30 June 2011	Graziano Pellè	Italy	(Netherlands) AZ	Parma	€1.5M
30 June 2011	Ferdinando Coppola	Italy	Milan	Torino	Loan, Free
30 June 2011	Nnamdi Oduamadi	Italy	Milan	Torino	Loan, Free

==== Notes ====
1. Player officially joined his new club on 1 July 2011.

Players who spent last season on loan were marked in Italic
