= Daniele Ferri =

Italian footballer (born 1992)

Personal information
- Date of birth: 7 March 1992 (age 34)
- Place of birth: Forlì, Italy
- Height: 1.93 m (6 ft 4 in)
- Position: Forward

Youth career
- –2011: Cesena

Senior career*
Years	Team	Apps	(Gls)
2010–2012	Cesena	0	(0)
2011–2012	→ Santarcangelo (loan)	19	(2)
2012–2016	Brescia	0	(0)
2012–2013	→ Forlì (loan)	14	(1)
2014	→ Pavia (loan)	8	(3)
2015	→ Gorica (loan)	1	(0)
2015–2016	→ Tre Fiori (loan)	20	(15)
2016–2017	Romagna Centro	28	(8)
2017–2018	Pianese	27	(8)
2018	Forlì	8	(0)
2018–2019	Axys Zola	14	(2)
2019–2020	Lentigione Calcio	16	(4)
2020–2021	ASD Diegaro		
2021	Mezzolara	11	(0)
2021–2022	ASD Massa Lombarda		
2022–2023	Faenza		
- * Club domestic league appearances and goals as of 20:35, 8 October 2026 (UTC)

Daniele Ferri (born 7 March 1992) is an Italian professional footballer who plays as a forward.

== Career ==
=== Cesena ===
Ferri started his professional career with A.C. Cesena. Ferri made his professional debut (and Serie B) on 23 January 2010 against Gallipoli. He substituted Ezequiel Schelotto in the 84th minute. Ferri did not play any game in 2010–11 Serie A. Ferri also spent 2 seasons with the reserve. He scored 5 goals in the 2010–11 season, which already made him the club's second top scorer, behind Alejandro Rodríguez.

In July 2011, Ferri left for fourth division newcomer Santarcangelo along with some Cesena half-owned to full-owned players: Rivolino Gavoci (Cesena only), Kadir Caidi (Bologna/Cesena), Giacomo Bassoli (Cesena/Bologna) and renewed the loan of Angelo Gregorio, Simone Tonelli and Nicola Del Pivo, which Gregorio and Tonelli now co-owned with Parma and Vicenza, respectively.

Ferri just made 9 starts in 19 league appearances with 2 goals. He also booked 2 times. Santarcangelo finished as the 8th in Group B of the fourth division. On 28 June 2012, Cesena sold Del Pivo, followed by Ferri on 29 June.

=== Brescia ===
On 29 June 2012, one day before the closure of the 2011–12 financial year of "Brescia Calcio SpA" and "AC Cesena SpA", both clubs made a notional swap deal, a déjà vu of June 2011. (Note: Brescia and Cesena also made pure player swap deals with other clubs in June 2011 (Brescia: M.Mandorlini and Pedrinelli, €1.5M; Cesena: K.Caidi–J.Luppi, Gregorio–G.Bassoli, L.Palumbo–T.Fabbri, Bonicelli–Tonelli, a total of €3.35M), June 2010 (Cesena only) and January 2010 (Brescia only).) It saw Ferri move to Brescia in a 4-year deal and Brescia youngster O'Neal Ephraim moved to Cesena, both in co-ownership deals. Both 50% registration rights of the players were tagged for €1.2 million. Once again, both clubs benefited from the swap deal in the short term to cover their financial crisis (Note: Cesena required recapitalization in June 2011 with high leverage and low equity. The already boosted closing results were: €502,106 equity; €75,294,748 asset verse €502,106 equity, 150 to 1. The boosted result on 30 June 2012 was €112,129,605 assets verse €2,572,339 equity, but with the player asset increase mostly due to player swap: Lapadula (€2.8M), Defrel (€2.4M), O'Neal (€2.4M), Bramati (€0.6M). Cesena was relegated in June 2012, and Brescia in 2011.) but mostly damaged by the future heavy amortization cost with impaired players resold value and/or performance, as the clubs bought a player with speculative price.

He left for Forlì, re-joining Cesena player Mattia Filippi and Leonardo Arrigoni. Ferri played for the club on 1 August 2012 in a friendly match. Ferri signed a 4-year contract.

Ferri returned to Brescia on 1 July 2013. He failed to find a club to borrow him in the first half of the 2013–14 season. On 31 January 2014, he was signed by A.C. Pavia. In June 2014, the co-ownership of Manuel Canini and Ferri was renewed. Ferri failed to find a club in the first half of the season again, which he was sent to Slovenia along with Matteo Boccaccini on 1 February 2015, for ND Gorica. In June 2015 Brescia acquired Ferri outright from Cesena; Cesena acquired Ephraim and Nicolò Lini outright.

Ferri was an unused bench in 2015–16 Coppa Italia, as no.25 of the first team. He was signed by Tre Fiori along with Emanuele Fonte before the closure of the transfer window.

=== Lentigione ===
Ahead of the 2019/20 season, Ferri joined Lentigione Calcio.
