= Kadir Caidi =

Italian footballer

Personal information
- Date of birth: 17 July 1990 (age 36)
- Place of birth: Ravenna, Italy
- Height: 1.83 m (6 ft 0 in)
- Position: Centre back

Youth career
- Cesena

Senior career*
| Years | Team | Apps | (Gls) |
| 2010–2011 | Cesena | 0 | (0) |
| 2010–2011 | → Valenzana (loan) | 11 | (0) |
| 2011–2014 | Bologna | 0 | (0) |
| 2011–2012 | → Santarcangelo (loan) | 1 | (0) |
| 2012 | → Bellaria (loan) | 5 | (0) |
| 2012–2013 | → Giacomense (loan) | 5 | (0) |
| 2013 | → Pontedera (loan) | 1 | (0) |
| 2013–2014 | → Bellaria (loan) | 3 | (0) |
| 2014–2015 | ASD Argentana 1912 | | |
| 2015–2016 | Ravenna | 17 | (0) |
| 2016–2019 | USD Classe | | |
| 2019–2020 | US Russi | | |
| 2020–2021 | ASD Calcio Del Duca Grama | | |
| 2021–2023 | ASD Medicina Fossatone | | |

International career
| 2009 | Italy U20 | 1 | (0) |
- * Club domestic league appearances and goals as of 19 November 2026

Kadir Caidi (born 17 July 1990) is an Italian footballer who plays as a centre back.

== Career ==
=== Early career ===
Born in Ravenna, Romagna, Kadir Caidi started his professional career at Romagna club A.C. Cesena along with his brother Nebil. K.Caidi was a member of Cesena U16 team for 2005–06 Emilia–Romagna student league. He was promoted to U17 team (Allievi) for national student league in 2006–07 season. K.Caidi was the member of the reserve B in Berretti reserve league in 2007–08 season. Reserve A and B merged in 2008–09 season, as Cesena first team was relegated at the end of 2007–08 Serie B, thus the reserve A was no longer eligible to national "spring" league. K.Caidi remained in the reserve for 2008–09 season. He followed the reserve returned to the spring league in 2009–10 season, but only played 15 times.

Caidi spent 2010–11 Lega Pro Seconda Divisione in Valenzana after he was graduated from the U20 reserve. K.Caidi made 11 appearances in his maiden season.

=== Bologna–Cesena swap ===
On 29 June 2011, one day before the closure of 2010–11 financial year, Cesena formed two swap deals with Bologna F.C. 1909, which K.Caidi was transferred to the capital of Emilia along with Angelo Gregorio in co-ownership deal for €750,000 and €1 million respectively. At the same time, Jacopo Luppi and Giacomo Bassoli moved to Romagna in the same formula. The all four players signed a 3-year contract, which both K.Caidi and Gregorio had an annual wage of €28,757 each, which barely above minimum wage. The deal made both club benefited financially in short term but no effect with the strength of the squad. (Note: Among the four players, only K.Caidi had a brief professional experience in 2010–11 Lega Pro Seconda Divisione. However the aggressive price tag made Cesena had a profit of €2M (Gregorio) and €1.5M (K.Caidi) respectively, while Bologna had a profit of €2M and €1.5M for G.Bassoli and J.Luppi, as youth product previously did not have a value as an intangible asset. As it was a pure swap deal, the increase in asset only in form of increase in intangible asset instead of cash (Bologna: Gregorio & K.Caidi; Cesena: G.Bassoli & J.Luppi). In June 2011 both clubs also made swap deal with other clubs, which both clubs eventually had a positive net equity (net asset) in order to register in 2011–12 Serie A without re-capitalization. On 30 June 2011, Cesena had a positive net equity of €502,106, but boosted by new signing of G.Bassoli (€2M), Palumbo (€2M), J.Luppi (€1.5M) and Bonicelli (€1.2M). While Bologna, had a positive net equity of €18,990,427 on 30 June 2011, which the club already received an equity contribution of €21,049,381 but the net equity was also boosted by new signing Pasi (€3.2M), Rickler (€3M), Gregorio (€2M) and K.Caidi (€1.5M). Moreover, half of the transfer fee of Nico Pulzetti (half of €3.3 million) was paid by Riccardo Regno (€1.65M tag). Moreover, as company had to "weather" its intangible asset by amortization, Gregorio and K.Caidi would have made Bologna have an amortization cost of €1,166,666 each seasons from 2011 to 2014 if both players eventually worth nothing. Moreover, both clubs had to pay VAT.)

=== Lega Pro loans ===
K.Caidi left for Italian fourth division newcomer Santarcangelo in July 2011, along with Gregorio (both from Bologna/Cesena), G.Bassoli (from Cesena/Bologna), Simone Tonelli (from Vicenza/Cesena), Nicola Del Pivo, Rivolino Gavoci and Daniele Ferri (Cesena only).

In January 2012 he was exchanged with Cesena teammate Michele Gabbianelli, who went on loan to Bellaria in the first half of the season. K.Caidi re-joined former Cesena teammate Marcello Scarponi and Thomas Fabbri (from Parma/Cesena), as well as met J.Luppi in Bellaria. The team was coached by the brother of Cesena president Nicola Campedelli.

In August 2012 Caidi left for Giacomense. Caidi was suspended in round 4 (23 September) due to his second caution (and subsequent sent off) on round 3, his second appearance for the team. He was booked again in round 8, his fourth game for Giacomense. Caidi played once more time for Giacomense in round 8 (2 December) before he was released in January 2013.

In June 2013 both clubs gave up the remain 50% registration rights.
