= Giacomo Bassoli =

Italian footballer

Personal information
- Date of birth: 19 June 1990 (age 36)
- Place of birth: Bologna, Italy
- Position: Right back

Youth career
- Bologna

Senior career*
Years	Team	Apps	(Gls)
2010–2011	Bologna	0	(0)
2010–2011	→ Sanremese (loan)	0	(0)
2011–2013	Cesena	0	(0)
2011–2012	→ Santarcangelo (loan)	0	(0)
2012	→ Valenzana (loan)	5	(0)
2013–2014	Santarcangelo	1	(0)
2014–2019	SCD Progresso Calcio		
2019–2021	SSD ARL Masi Torello Voghiera		
2021–2023	ASD Castenaso Calcio		
2023–2024	ASD Bentivoglio Calcio		
- * Club domestic league appearances and goals as of 8 October 2026

Giacomo Bassoli (born 19 June 1990) is an Italian footballer who plays as a right back.

== Career ==
=== Bologna ===
Born in Bologna, Emilia–Romagna, Giacomo Bassoli started his professional career at Bologna F.C. 1909 along with his twin brother Alessandro. He spent 4 seasons in the reserve league, since 2006–07 season. In 2006–07 season he also played for its student U17 team (Allievi). On 17 August 2010, his apprentice contract was converted to 3-year professional contract. On the same day he also joined Sanremese. In December FIGC fined Sanremese, ordered the club to pay €14,500 to Bologna.

=== Bologna–Cesena swap ===
On 29 June 2011, one day before the closure of 2010–11 financial year, Bologna formed two swap deals with A.C. Cesena, which G.Bassoli was transferred to the Romagna along with Jacopo Luppi in co-ownership deal for €1 million and €750,000 respectively. The Emilia club, signed Angelo Gregorio and Kadir Caidi in the same formula. The all four players signed a 3-year contract. The deal made both clubs had an immediately financial boost and a speculative investment. (Note: Among the four players, only K.Caidi had a brief professional experience in 2010–11 Lega Pro Seconda Divisione. However the aggressive price tag made Bologna had a profit of €2M (G.Bassoli) and €1.5M (J.Luppi) respectively, while Cesena had a profit of €2M and €1.5M for Gregorio and K.Caidi, as youth product previously did not have a value as an intangible asset. As it was a pure swap deal, the increase in asset only in form of increase in intangible asset instead of cash (Bologna: Gregorio & K.Caidi; Cesena: G.Bassoli & J.Luppi). In June 2011 both clubs also made swap deal with other clubs, which both clubs eventually had a positive net equity (net asset) in order to register in 2011–12 Serie A without re-capitalization. On 30 June 2011, Cesena had a positive net equity of €502,106, but boosted by new signing of G.Bassoli (€2M), Palumbo (€2M), J.Luppi (€1.5M) and Bonicelli (€1.2M). While Bologna, had a positive net equity of €18,990,427 on 30 June 2011, which the club already received an equity contribution of €21,049,381 but the net equity was also boosted by new signing Pasi (€3.2M), Rickler (€3M), Gregorio (€2M) and K.Caidi (€1.5M). Moreover, half of the transfer fee of Nico Pulzetti (half of €3.3 million) was paid by Riccardo Regno (€1.65M tag). Moreover, as company had to "weather" its intangible asset by amortization, G.Bassoli and J.Luppi would have made Cesena have an amortization cost of €1,166,666 each seasons from 2011 to 2014 if both players eventually worth nothing. Moreover, both clubs had to pay VAT.)

=== Lega Pro loans ===
In July 2011 G.Bassoli left for Santarcangelo in temporary deal (from Cesena/Bologna), along with K.Caidi, Gregorio (from Bologna/Cesena). The club also signed Simone Tonelli from Vicenza/Cesena, which sold by Cesena to Vicenza for another aggressive price in June 2011, and Nicola Del Pivo and Daniele Ferri from Cesena only.

However, G.Bassoli did not made any league appearance in 2011–12 Lega Pro Seconda Divisione. In January 2012, both K.Caidi and G.Bassoli left the club. G.Bassoli was signed by Valenzana, joining Luca Righini, who also sold by Cesena to Vicenza in aggressive price in 2010. Santarcangelo signed Francesco Laezza from Valenzana in the same deal. In the same window, Valenzana also got keeper Aldo Simoncini from Cesena.

In June 2012, the co-ownership deal was renewed. However, he did not receive any call-up for pre-season from Cesena.

After a season without a club, Bologna gave up the remaining 50% registration rights of Bassoli and Luppi, as well as Cesena gave up its portion on Caidi and Gregorio.

On 31 January 2014 he returned to Santarcangelo.
