= Angelo Gregorio =

Italian footballer (born 1991)

Personal information
- Date of birth: 11 April 1991 (age 35)
- Place of birth: Forlimpopoli, Italy
- Position: Centre back

Team information
- Current team: Tre Penne
- Number: 5

Youth career
- Cesena

Senior career*
Years	Team	Apps	(Gls)
2010–2011	Cesena	0	(0)
2010–2011	→ Santarcangelo (loan)	35	(1)
2011–2014	Bologna	0	(0)
2011–2012	→ Santarcangelo (loan)	28	(0)
2012–2013	→ Pontedera (loan)	22	(2)
2013–2014	→ Teramo (loan)	15	(0)
2014–2015	Romagna Centro	16	(0)
2015	San Severo	12	(1)
2015–2016	Romagna Centro	36	(4)
2016–2017	Bra	23	(0)
2017–2018	Tuttocuoio	36	(1)
2018–2019	ASD Savignanese	31	(0)
2019	ASD Team Altamura	14	(1)
2019–2020	Franciacorta FC	6	(0)
2020–2022	Sammaurese Calcio	42	(2)
2022–2023	Tre Fiori	9	(0)
2023	Libertas	18	(0)
2025–	Tre Penne	24	(1)
- * Club domestic league appearances and goals as of 25 June 2026

Angelo Gregorio (born 11 April 1991) is an Italian footballer who plays as a defender for Tre Penne.

== Career ==
=== Early career ===
Gregorio started his career in A.C. Cesena. He was the member of the youth reserve B squad in the 2007–08 season for Berretti reserve league. Reserve A and B merged in 2008–09 season, as the Cesena first team was relegated at the end of 2007–08 Serie B, thus the reserve A was no longer eligible for the Campionato Nazionale Primavera (the youth national "spring" league). Gregorio remained in the reserve for 2008–09 season. He followed the under-20 reserve returned to the spring league in 2009–10 season, but only played 13 times.

Gregorio spent 2010–11 Serie D season in Santarcangelo along with Simone Tonelli. He won the Group F champion and promoted to professional league.

=== Bologna–Cesena swap ===
On 29 June 2011, one day before the closure of 2010–11 financial year, Cesena formed two swap deals with Bologna F.C. 1909, which Gregorio was transferred to the capital of Emilia along with Kadir Caidi in co-ownership deal for €1 million and €750,000 respectively. At the same time, Giacomo Bassoli and Jacopo Luppi moved to Romagna in the same formula. The deal made the clubs had a financial boost instead of immediate impact on the squad. (Note: The all four players signed a 3-year contract, which both K.Caidi and Gregorio had an annual wage of €28,757 each. Among the four players, only K.Caidi had a brief professional experience in 2010–11 Lega Pro Seconda Divisione. However the aggressive price tag made Cesena had a profit of €2M (Gregorio) and €1.5M (K.Caidi) respectively, while Bologna had a profit of €2M and €1.5M for G.Bassoli and J.Luppi, as youth product previously did not have a value as an intangible asset. As it was a pure swap deal, the increase in asset only in form of increase in intangible asset instead of cash (Bologna: Gregorio & K.Caidi; Cesena: G.Bassoli & J.Luppi). In June 2011 both clubs also made swap deal with other clubs, which both clubs eventually had a positive net equity (net asset) in order to register in 2011–12 Serie A without re-capitalization. On 30 June 2011, Cesena had a positive net equity of €502,106, but boosted by new signing of G.Bassoli (€2M), Palumbo (€2M), J.Luppi (€1.5M) and Bonicelli (€1.2M). While Bologna, had a positive net equity of €18,990,427 on 30 June 2011, which the club already received an equity contribution of €21,049,381 but the net equity was also boosted by new signing Pasi (€3.2M), Rickler (€3M), Gregorio (€2M) and K.Caidi (€1.5M). Moreover, half of the transfer fee of Nico Pulzetti (half of €3.3 million) was paid by Riccardo Regno (€1.65M tag). Moreover, as company had to "weather" its intangible asset by amortization, Gregorio and K.Caidi would have made Bologna have an amortization cost of €1,166,666 each seasons from 2011 to 2014 if both players eventually worth nothing. Moreover, both clubs had to pay VAT.) La Repubblica had criticized Bologna's swap deal with Livorno and Chievo in the same month were exploit to the transfer market to fix the balance sheet.

=== Lega Pro loans ===
Gregorio left for Italian fourth division newcomer Santarcangelo in July 2011, along with K.Caidi (both from Bologna/Cesena), G.Bassoli (from Cesena/Bologna), Rivolino Gavoci, Nicola Del Pivo and Daniele Ferri (Cesena only). The club also renewed the loan of former Cesena teammate Simone Tonelli, however now co-owned between Vicenza and Cesena. In June 2012 the ownerships were renewed. Gregorio left for Pontedera in 2012–13 Lega Pro Seconda Divisione. In June 2013 both clubs gave up the remain 50% registration rights on their youth products. On 18 July 2013 he was signed by Teramo.
