= Rădoi =

Rădoi is a Romanian language surname. People with the name include:

- Andrei Rădoi (born 1987), Romanian rugby union player
- Mirel Rădoi (born 1981), Romanian footballer
- Sorin Rădoi (born 1985), Romanian footballer
- Sorin Rădoi (footballer, born 1990) (born 1990), Romanian footballer
- Robert Rădoi (born 2007), Romanian footballer
