= Nicola Del Pivo =

Italian footballer

Personal information
- Date of birth: 10 April 1992 (age 34)
- Place of birth: Cesena, Italy
- Height: 1.83 m (6 ft 0 in)
- Position: Midfielder

Team information
- Current team: Polisportiva Vismara 2008

Youth career
- Cesena

Senior career*
Years	Team	Apps	(Gls)
2010–2012	Cesena	0	(0)
2010–2012	→ Santarcangelo (loan)	60	(0)
2012–2013	Parma	0	(0)
2012–2013	→ Como (loan)	5	(0)
2013	→ Santarcangelo (loan)	9	(0)
2013–2016	Cesena	0	(0)
2013–2014	→ Bellaria Igea (loan)	22	(1)
2015–2016	→ Pennarossa (loan)	25	(5)
2016–2017	Vis Pesaro	10	(0)
2017–2020	Santa Veneranda		
2020–2022	Athletico Tavullia		
2022–2023	ASD Gallo Colbordolo		
2023–2024	Real Montecchio		
2024–	Polisportiva Vismara 2008		
- * Club domestic league appearances and goals as of 8 October 2026

Nicola Del Pivo (born 10 April 1992) is an Italian footballer who plays as a midfielder for Polisportiva Vismara 2008.

== Career ==
=== Cesena ===
Del Pivo started his professional career at hometown club Cesena. He was in the U17 youth team in 2008–09 season. Del Pivo was a member of the reserve in 2009–10 season, and Cesena finished 9th in group B. In the next season, Del Pivo left for senior team Santarcangelo along with Simone Tonelli and Angelo Gregorio, instead of remaining in the reserve. The club won the Group F of 2010–11 Serie D and promoted. However Del Pivo infamously booked 13 times and suspended four times. (4th, 8th, 11th and 13th card)

In July 2011 the temporary deal was renewed. The club also signed 6 other players from Cesena or from Cesena and their co-owner, namely Kadir Caidi, Gregorio (Bologna/Cesena), Tonelli (Parma/Cesena), Giacomo Bassoli (Cesena/Bologna), Rivolino Gavoci and Daniele Ferri (both Cesena only). The club finished as the 8th of 2011–12 Lega Pro Seconda Divisione Group A. Del Pivo booked 6 times that season and suspended once.

Del Pivo returned to Cesena in June 2012. On 28 June 2012, he left the club for Parma.

=== Parma ===
On 28 June 2012, two days before the closure of 2011–12 financial year of "AC Cesena SpA" and "Parma FC SpA", both clubs made notional swap deal which started since June 2010 (Note: Milan Đurić and Alberto Galuppo tagged €1.1M in June 2010; Thomas Fabbri and Luigi Palumbo tagged €1 million in June 2011; Galuppo returns for €1M and Marco Rossi to Cesena for €2M). Cesena got half of the registration rights of bomber Gianluca Lapadula (€1.4 million) and forward Grégoire Defrel (€1.2 million) while Parma got keeper Andrea Rossini (€1.6 million) and Del Pivo (€1 million). The deal boosted Cesena financially as well as Parma (Note: In form of intangible asset increased. Cesena should recapitalized already in June 2011 with €502,106 equity and high leverage: €75,294,748 asset verse €502,106 equity; 150 to 1. Moreover Cesena relegated in May 2012. Cesena ended up without recapitalization for a second year with notional gain from player selling of €12,694,666 and a side effect of skyrocketed amortization on player asset due to previous player swaps.), with both clubs got speculative player performance and/or resold value and in reverse, heavy amortization cost in the future. Cesena got the actual use of Defrel, Lapadula and Rossini (later left on loan); Parma sent Del Pivo to Calcio Como on 11 July 2012. Del Pivo made his debut in a friendly against Tottenham and followed by Internazionale.

In January 2013 he was sent back to Santarcangelo.

=== Cesena return ===
On 20 June 2013, Del Pivo was sold back to Cesena for €1.5 million in a four-year contract and Palumbo also joined Cesena outright €1.5 million; Parma also swapped Davide Adorni for Marco Paolini of Cesena in new co-ownership deal, both tagged for €1 million. Co-currently 50% registration rights of Lapadula returned to Parma for €1.4 million as well as the signing of 50% registration rights of Yohan Benalouane for €600,000 and Marco Parolo from Cesena outright on 1 July 2013 for €1 million. On 12 July Djuric also returned to Cesena for €500.

=== Serie D ===
Del Pivo joined Vis Pesaro in summer 2016.
