= Mirko Bigazzi =

Italian footballer (born 1989)

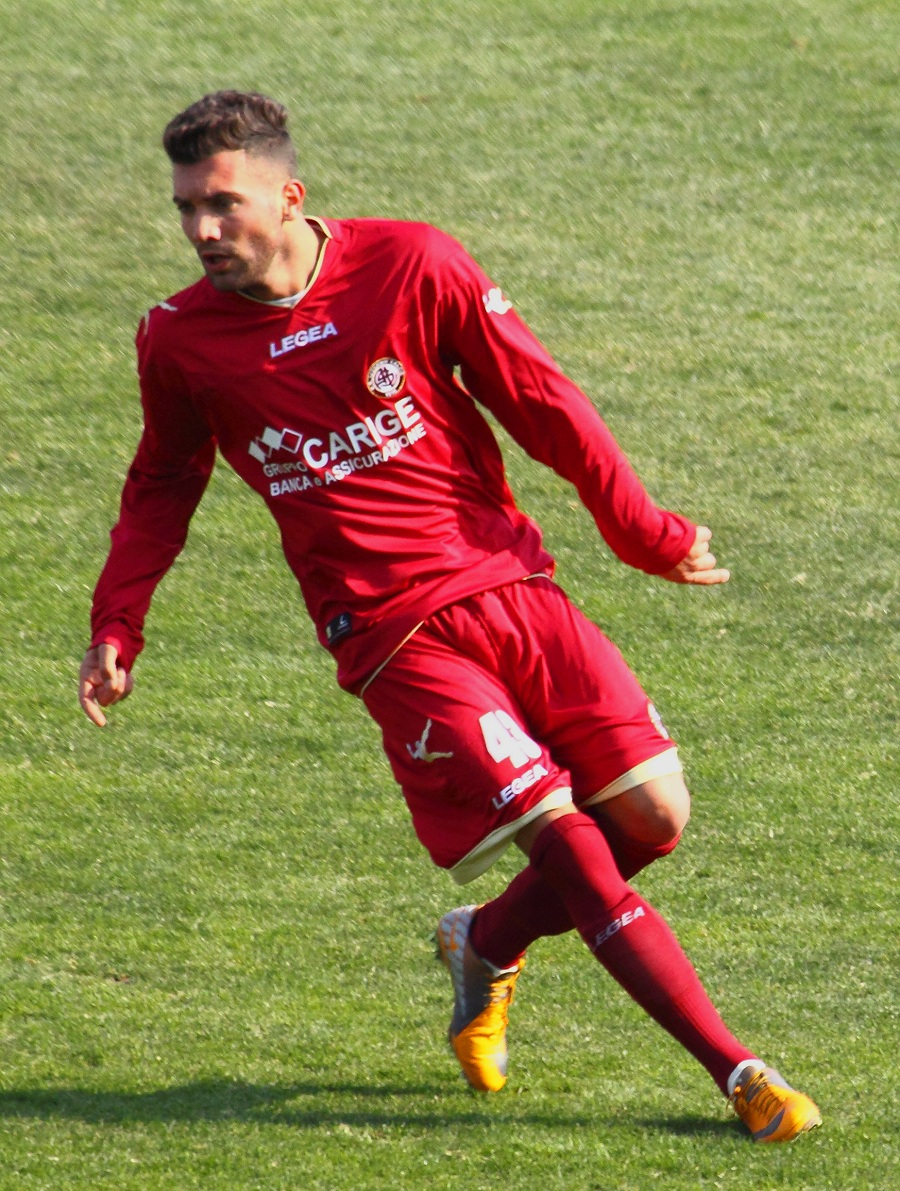
- Mirko Bigazzi in 2012

Personal information
- Date of birth: 3 April 1989 (age 37)
- Place of birth: Cecina, Italy
- Height: 1.78 m (5 ft 10 in)
- Position: Midfielder

Youth career
- AC Cecina
- 2006–2008: Livorno

Senior career*
Years	Team	Apps	(Gls)
2008–2010	Carrarese	58	(13)
2010–2015	Livorno	35	(4)
2010–2011	→ Gela (loan)	29	(4)
2013–2014	→ Olhanense (loan)	12	(0)
2014−2015	→ Torres 1903 (loan)	1	(0)
2015–2016	Pro Patria	1	(0)
2017	Real Forte	11	(1)
2017–2018	Valdinievole Montecatini	16	(1)
2018–2019	Atletico Piombino	14	(3)
- * Club domestic league appearances and goals as of 22:28, 7 April 2020 (UTC)

Mirko Bigazzi (born 3 April 1989) is an Italian professional footballer who plays for A.D. Valdinievole Montecatini, as a midfielder.

== Career ==
Born in Cecina, Bigazzi has played in Italy and Portugal for Livorno, Gela and Olhanense.

On 25 July 2013, he moved on loan deal to Olhanense. A year later he moved on another loan, now to Torres 1903.

On 16 September 2015 Bigazzi and Riccardo Regno were signed by Pro Patria.
