= Simone Tonelli =

Italian footballer

Personal information
- Date of birth: 13 June 1991 (age 35)
- Place of birth: Fossombrone, Italy
- Height: 1.76 m (5 ft 9 in)
- Positions: Midfielder; forward

Team information
- Current team: United Riccione
- Number: 30

Youth career
- Delfino Fano
- Cesena

Senior career*
| Years | Team | Apps | (Gls) |
| 2010–2011 | Cesena | 0 | (0) |
| 2010–2011 | → Santarcangelo (loan) | 29 | (5) |
| 2011–2015 | Vicenza | 0 | (0) |
| 2011–2012 | → Santarcangelo (loan) | 28 | (6) |
| 2012–2013 | → Venezia (loan) | 16 | (0) |
| 2013–2014 | → Forlì (loan) | 25 | (7) |
| 2014–2015 | Imolese | 24 | (4) |
| 2015–2016 | Romagna Centro | 33 | (9) |
| 2016–2017 | Forlì | 27 | (2) |
| 2017–2018 | Matelica | 28 | (8) |
| 2018 | Forlì | 11 | (0) |
| 2018–2019 | Cesena | 23 | (1) |
| 2019–2020 | Campodarsego | 21 | (5) |
| 2020–2021 | Cjarlins Muzane | 35 | (2) |
| 2021–2023 | Rimini | 65 | (6) |
| 2023– | United Riccione | 17 | (3) |
- * Club domestic league appearances and goals as of 6 January 2024

Simone Tonelli (born 13 June 1991) is an Italian footballer who plays as a midfielder or forward for Serie D club United Riccione.

== Career ==
=== Early career ===
Tonelli started his career in a local side of Fano – A.S.D. C.S.I. Delfino Fano. He then signed by Cesena and played in the "Berretti" reserve league in 2008–09 season. Tonelli spent 2009–10 season in the "spring" reserve league (dedicated for the reserve of Serie A and B), as Cesena was promoted.

In mid-2010 Tonelli left for amateur club Santarcangelo along with Angelo Gregorio and Nicola Del Pivo. The club won the Group F of 2010–11 Serie D and promoted.

=== Cesena–Vicenza swap ===
On 30 June 2011, the last day of 2010–11 financial year, Tonelli was sold to Serie B club Vicenza in co-ownership, for €600,000. Co-currently, Edoardo Bonicelli was signed by Cesena in the same formula. Tonelli signed a 4-year contract while Bonicelli signed a 3-year deal. Despite both players yet to make professional debut at that time, the aggressive price tag made both club had a profit of €1.2 million despite in form of increase in intangible asset (Tonelli for Vicenza; Bonicelli for Cesena). Moreover, it created an amortize cost of €400,000 to Cesena in next 3 seasons and Vicenza of €300,000 in next 4 seasons if both players eventually worth nothing. Lastly, both clubs had to pay VAT. On 30 June 2011, Cesena had a positive net asset of €502,106 thus passed the financial test for 2011–12 Serie A without re-capitalization due to negative equity. However the positive net equity was boosted by G.Bassoli (€2M), Palumbo (€2M), J.Luppi (€1.5M) and Bonicelli (€1.2M). On Vicenza side, the club had a positive net equity of €5,210,591 which boosted by new signing Minesso (€2M) and Tonelli (€1.2M) as well as residual value of retired player Di Donato (€0.6M).

=== Lega Pro loans ===
Tonelli returned to Santarcangelo for 2011–12 Lega Pro Seconda Divisione in temporary deal from Vicenza/Cesena. The club also signed G.Bassoli from Cesena/Bologna and Kadir Caidi and Angelo Gregorio from Bologna/Cesena and Nicola Del Pivo, Rivolino Gavoci and Daniele Ferri from Cesena only.

On 16 August 2012 Tonelli left for Venezia. Tonelli made his debut in Lega Pro Cup as a substitute. He also made his first starts for the club in the second match of the cup. Tonelli was a substitute in most of his appearances for Venice .

On 20 June 2013 Vicenza gave up the remain registration rights of Bonicelli as well as Cesena gave up the remain registration rights of Tonelli. On 23 July 2013 Tonelli was signed by Forlì.
