= Dario Toninelli =

Italian footballer (born 1992)

Personal information
- Date of birth: 23 January 1992 (age 34)
- Place of birth: Milan, Italy
- Height: 1.85 m (6 ft 1 in)
- Position: Right back

Team information
- Current team: Sangiuliano City
- Number: 30

Youth career
- Milan
- 2010–2011: Varese

Senior career*
Years	Team	Apps	(Gls)
2011–2012	Varese	0	(0)
2011–2012	→ Latina (loan)	9	(0)
2012–2016	Bassano	130	(0)
2016–2017	Livorno	32	(0)
2017–2018	Santarcangelo	30	(1)
2018–2022	Como	59	(1)
2022–2024	Pro Sesto	85	(0)
2024–	Sangiuliano City	10	(1)

International career
2012	Italy U20	1	(0)
- * Club domestic league appearances and goals as of 17 November 2024

Dario Toninelli (born 23 January 1992) is an Italian footballer who plays for Serie D club Sangiuliano City.

== Biography ==
Born in Milan, Lombardy, Toninelli played for AC Milan's Berretti under-18 team, losing to Atalanta in the finals of the wild card group. In August 2010 Toninelli left for Serie B club Varese on free transfer, losing to Roma in the final of the under-20 reserve league.

At the start of 2011–12 season, Toninelli left for Italian third division club Latina. After the club signed Lorenzo Burzigotti, Toninelli was moved to Bassano in temporary deal.

On 12 July 2012 Toninelli and Federico Furlan were signed by Bassano in co-ownership deal. In June 2013 the co-ownership were renewed. In June 2014 the co-ownership deal was renewed.

He started all 3 promotion playoffs for Bassano in 2014–15 season, including a penalty shootout against Reggiana in semi-finals. (as of semi-final match). On 25 July 2018, he extended his contract with Bassano until 2016.

In 2016, he was signed by Livorno.

On 23 August 2018, he signed with Serie D club Como. Following Como's promotion to Serie C, he signed a new 2-year contract with the club on 28 June 2019. For the 2021–22 season, Como was promoted to Serie B.

On 9 January 2022, Toninelli moved to Pro Sesto.
