= Daniele Bernasconi =

Italian footballer (born 1992)

Personal information
- Date of birth: 13 August 1992 (age 34)
- Place of birth: Albano Laziale, Italy
- Position: Midfielder

Team information
- Current team: Vigor Carpaneto

Senior career*
Years	Team	Apps	(Gls)
2008–2010	Cynthia	19	(?)
2010–2015	Parma	0	(0)
2011–2013	→ Fondi (loan)	60	(12)
2013–2014	→ Renate (loan)	11	(1)
2014–2015	→ L'Aquila (loan)	2	(0)
2015	→ Monza (loan)	11	(0)
2016	Correggese	13	(6)
2016–2017	ArzignanoChiampo	28	(7)
2017	FC Calvi Noale	13	(2)
2017–	Vigor Carpaneto	11	(2)
- * Club domestic league appearances and goals

Daniele Bernasconi (born 13 August 1992) is an Italian footballer who plays for ASD Vigor Carpaneto.

== Biography ==
Born in Albano Laziale, Lazio region, Bernasconi started his career at Serie D club Cynthia. On 1 February 2010 he was signed by Serie A club Parma F.C. in temporary deal. The deal became definitive in summer 2010. From 2011 to 2013 he left for Fondi in temporary deal. On 10 July 2013 Bernasconi and Pedrinelli were signed by Renate.

On 5 August 2014 Bernasconi, Cacchioli and Maccarrone were signed by L'Aquila in temporary deals. On 2 February 2015 Bernasconi was signed by Monza.
