= Manuel Canini =

Italian footballer

Personal information
- Date of birth: 22 August 1993 (age 33)
- Place of birth: Rimini, Italy
- Height: 1.78 m (5 ft 10 in)
- Position: Forward

Team information
- Current team: Vis Pesaro

Youth career
- –2009: Cesena
- 2009–2010: Internazionale
- 2010–2012: Cesena

Senior career*
Years	Team	Apps	(Gls)
2012–2013	Cesena	0	(0)
2012–2013	→ Santarcangelo (loan)	17	(4)
2013–2015	Brescia	0	(0)
2015–	Vis Pesaro	0	(0)
- * Club domestic league appearances and goals

Manuel Canini (born 22 August 1993) is an Italian footballer who plays as a forward for Vis Pesaro.

== Career ==
=== Cesena ===
Born in Rimini, Romagna Canini started his career at Romagna team AC Cesena. He received his only national call-up from U16 team in March 2009. On 23 July 2009 F.C. Internazionale Milano bought him from Cesena in co-ownership deal for €220,000. In January 2010 Canini returned to Cesena and the temporary deal (as well as co-ownership) was renewed in June 2010, and again in June (co-ownership) and August 2011 (temporary deal).

In June 2012 Inter gave up its portion on Canini to Cesena for a peppercorn of €500. In the summer transfer window he left for Santarcangelo, re-joining former Cesena team-mate Thomas Fabbri and Alessandro Saporetti.

Canini made his first team debut in 2012–13 Coppa Italia Lega Pro. He also played the next two cup matches as well as in 2012–13 Lega Pro Seconda Divisione.

=== Brescia ===
On 27 June 2013, the 4th last day of 2012–13 financial season of "AC Cesena SpA" and "Brescia Calcio SpA", both clubs made an agreement that 50% registration rights of Canini moved to Brescia and Nicolò Lini moved to Cesena also in the same formula. 50% registration rights of Canini and Lini were "valued" €600,000. Both clubs had a player profit to boost the financial result of 2012–13 in order to register for 2013–14 Serie B, but also potential damaged the future financial condition by the amortization expense of the new signing if the performance of new signing were impaired. Canini signed a 3-year contract but Brescia failed to find a club in lower divisions for him in 2013–14 and 2014–15 season.

=== Vis Pesaro ===
Circa April 2015 Canini was signed by Serie D club Vis Pesaro. Brescia also wrote down Canini's residual contract value in its financial accounts. Canini made his debut during 2015–16 Serie D.
