= Jacopo Luppi =

Italian footballer

Personal information
- Date of birth: 12 August 1992 (age 34)
- Place of birth: Bologna, Italy
- Position: Midfielder

Youth career
- Bologna

Senior career*
Years	Team	Apps	(Gls)
2011–2013	Cesena	0	(0)
2011–2012	→ Bellaria (loan)	20	(0)
- * Club domestic league appearances and goals

Jacopo Luppi (born 12 August 1992) is an Italian footballer who plays as a midfielder.

== Career ==
=== Youth career ===
Born in Bologna, the capital of Emilia–Romagna region, Jacopo Luppi started his career at Bologna F.C. 1909. J.Luppi was in the Bologna U17 team for 2008–09 national student league (Allievi). Co-currently with Davide Luppi formally left the club in 2009 after a loan, Jacopo was a member of the reserve team from 2009 to 2011. However, he only made 16 appearances in the group stage of the "spring" reserve league.

=== Bologna–Cesena swap ===
On 29 June 2011, one day before the closure of 2010–11 financial year, Bologna formed two swap deals with A.C. Cesena, which J.Luppi was transferred to the Romagna along with Giacomo Bassoli in co-ownership deal for €750,000 and €1 million respectively. The Emilia club, signed Kadir Caidi and Angelo Gregorio in the same formula. The all four players signed a 3-year contract. The deal made both clubs had an immediately financial boost and a speculative investment. (Note: Among the four players, only K.Caidi had a brief professional experience in 2010–11 Lega Pro Seconda Divisione. However the aggressive price tag made Bologna had a profit of €2M (G.Bassoli) and €1.5M (J.Luppi) respectively, while Cesena had a profit of €2M and €1.5M for Gregorio and K.Caidi, as youth product previously did not have a value as an intangible asset. As it was a pure swap deal, the increase in asset only in form of increase in intangible asset instead of cash (Bologna: Gregorio & K.Caidi; Cesena: G.Bassoli & J.Luppi). In June 2011 both clubs also made swap deal with other clubs, which both clubs eventually had a positive net equity (net asset) in order to register in 2011–12 Serie A without re-capitalization. On 30 June 2011, Cesena had a positive net equity of €502,106, but boosted by new signing of G.Bassoli (€2M), Palumbo (€2M), J.Luppi (€1.5M) and Bonicelli (€1.2M). While Bologna, had a positive net equity of €18,990,427 on 30 June 2011, which the club already received an equity contribution of €21,049,381 but the net equity was also boosted by new signing Pasi (€3.2M), Rickler (€3M), Gregorio (€2M) and K.Caidi (€1.5M). Moreover, half of the transfer fee of Nico Pulzetti (half of €3.3 million) was paid by Riccardo Regno (€1.65M tag). Moreover, as company had to "weather" its intangible asset by amortization, G.Bassoli and J.Luppi would make Cesena have an amortization cost of €1,166,666 each seasons from 2011 to 2014 if both players eventually worth nothing. Moreover, both clubs had to pay VAT.)

=== Lega Pro loan ===
On 5 August 2011 J.Luppi left for Bellaria in temporary deal from Cesena/Bologna as well as Thomas Fabbri from Parma/Cesena and Marcello Scarponi, Michele Gabbianelli from Cesena. The Romagna club also retained Alessio Briglia who already transferred to Cesena in March 2011. Moreover, the team was coached by the brother of Cesena president, Nicola Campedelli.

Circa July 2013 Luppi was released by Cesena one year early from his contract.
