= Oscar Branzani =

Italian professional footballer

Personal information
- Date of birth: 13 November 1989 (age 36)
- Place of birth: Naples, Italy
- Height: 1.78 m (5 ft 10 in)
- Position: Midfielder

Youth career
- 2004–2005: Giugliano
- Giacomense

Senior career*
Years	Team	Apps	(Gls)
2007–2010	Giacomense	41	(1)
2010–2011	Taranto	18	(0)
2011–2013	Cittadella	17	(0)
2013	→ Andria (loan)	11	(0)
2013–2015	Barletta	36	(1)
Total		123	(2)
- * Club domestic league appearances and goals

Oscar Branzani (born 13 November 1989) is an Italian former footballer who plays as a midfielder.

== Biography ==
=== Giacomense ===
Born in Naples, Campania, Branzani started his senior career at Emilian club Giacomense. He played 4 times in 2007–08 Serie D. The club won promotion in 2008, to professional league Lega Pro Seconda Divisione (ex–Serie C2). Branzani received call-up to Italy under-20 "C" team in 2009.

=== Taranto ===
In 2010, he was signed by Lega Pro Prima Divisione (ex–Serie C1) club Taranto.

=== Cittadella ===
On 8 July 2011 he was signed by Serie B club Sampdoria for around €550,000, but farmed to fellow second division club Cittadella in co-ownership deal for €275,000. In June 2012 the co-ownership was renewed. On 31 January 2013 Branzani left for Andria. In June 2013 Sampdoria gave up the remain 50% registration rights to Cittadella for free.

=== Barletta ===
On 10 August 2013 Branzani left for Italian third division club Barletta in new co-ownership deal; Alessandro De Leidi left for Cittadella in the same formula from Barletta. The club finished as the 14th of Group B (17 teams in total). However, due to the two divisions of Lega Pro (ex–Serie C) would be merged back to one division in 2014, the club automatically qualified for the professional league in 2014–15 season.

== Honours ==
- Serie D: 2008 (Giacomense)
