= Cristian Pedrinelli =

Italian footballer (born 1993)

Personal information
- Date of birth: 16 April 1993 (age 33)
- Place of birth: Chiari, Italy
- Position: Midfielder

Youth career
- –2011: Brescia
- 2011–2012: Parma

Senior career*
Years	Team	Apps	(Gls)
2012–2015	Parma	0	(0)
2012–2013	→ FeralpiSalò (loan)	1	(0)
2013–2015	→ Renate (loan)	6	(0)
- * Club domestic league appearances and goals

Cristian Pedrinelli (born 16 April 1993) is an Italian footballer.

Pedrinelli made his professional debut on 5 May 2013.

== Biography ==
=== Brescia ===
Born in Chiari, the Province of Brescia, Lombardy, Pedrinelli started his career at Brescia Calcio. Pedrinelli was a member of under-17 team in 2009–10 season. In 2010–11 season he was the member of under-20 reserve team. He also played for the under-18 team (reserve B) that season.

=== Parma ===
In June 2011 Pedrinelli was sold to Parma in 5-year contract, with Matteo Mandorlini moved to opposite direction. 50% registration rights of Pedrinelli and Mandorlini both "valued" €1.5 million. In 2011–12 season he was the member of the reserve team of Parma. He received his only Italy national under-19 football team call-up in January 2012 against the reserve of Empoli. He was the substitute of Massimiliano Busellato in that match.

In 2012–13 season the age limit of the reserve had lowered to under-19, thus Pedrinelli had to left the club. Pedrinelli (half owned by Brescia), Michele Bentoglio, Francesco Finocchio (half owned by Bologna) and Alberto Gallinetta were signed by FeralpiSalò on 7 July 2012 from Parma. Pedrinelli made his league debut on 5 May 2013, the second last round of 2012–13 Lega Pro Prima Divisione. He was a substitute for Andrea Bracaletti.

On 20 June 2013 Pedrinelli was signed by Parma outright for another €80,000, with Mandorlini moved to Brescia for free. On 10 July 2013 Pedrinelli and Daniele Bernasconi were signed by Renate.

On 3 July 2014 the temporary deal was extended.
