= Federico Sevieri =

Italian footballer

Personal information
- Date of birth: 19 March 1991 (age 35)
- Place of birth: Rome, Italy
- Height: 1.74 m (5 ft 8 1/2 in)
- Position: Midfielder

Team information
- Current team: Cynthialbalonga

Youth career
- –2010: Lazio

Senior career*
Years	Team	Apps	(Gls)
2009–2010	Lazio	0	(0)
2010–2014	Lumezzane	59	(0)
2013	→ AJ Fano (loan)	13	(0)
2013–2014	→ Castiglione (loan)	10	(0)
2014–2015	Savoia	13	(0)
2015–2016	Fiumicino		
2016–2019	SFF Atletico		
2019	Atletico Fiuggi	9	(0)
2019–2020	Albalonga	10	(0)
2020–2021	Latina	29	(0)
2021–	Cynthialbalonga	6	(0)

International career^{‡}
2007	Italy U-16	3	(0)
2009	Italy U-18	1	(0)
- * Club domestic league appearances and goals as of 20 November 2021 ‡ National team caps and goals as of 13 January 2009

Federico Sevieri (born 19 March 1991) is an Italian professional football player who plays for Serie D club Cynthialbalonga.

== Career ==
=== Club career ===
He made his debut for the Lazio main squad on 17 December 2009 when he started in a 2009–10 UEFA Europa League game against PFC Levski Sofia. In mid-2010 he was sold to Lumezzane in co-ownership deal.

Sevieri joined Sporting Città di Fiumicino in the Eccellenza Lazio Girone A, a regional league on the fifth level of Italian football, in the summer 2015. In 2016, Sporting Città di Fiumicino merged with Pol.D. Fregene and became to SFF Atletico. In the summer 2019, the club merged again, this time with Atletico Fiuggi Terme and was then named A.S.D. Atletico Terme Fiuggi. He played under all three mergers.

In December 2019, Sevieri moved to Serie D club Albalonga.
