= Daniele Abbracciante =

Italian footballer (born 1994)

Personal information
- Date of birth: 8 April 1994 (age 32)
- Place of birth: Latina, Italy
- Height: 1.82 m (6 ft 0 in)
- Position: Forward

Youth career
- Frosinone
- 2010–2013: Parma

Senior career*
Years	Team	Apps	(Gls)
2013–2014	Parma	0	(0)
2013–2014	→ L'Aquila (loan)	1	(0)
2014–2015	Grosseto	0	(0)
2015	Ischia	2	(0)
Total		3	(0)

International career
2010–2011	Italy U17	11	(3)
- * Club domestic league appearances and goals

Daniele Abbracciante (born 8 April 1994) is an Italian former footballer who plays as a forward.

== Career ==
=== Frosinone ===
Born in Latina, Lazio region, Abbracciante started his career at Lazio club Frosinone, where he played for the club in under 16-17 mixed team in 2009–10 season.

=== Parma ===
On 31 August 2010, along with team-mate Mirko Gori, they were signed by Serie A club Parma in temporary deal for €25,000 each, with option to co-contract the player. Abbracciante was a player of under-17 youth team of Parma in 2010–11 season. In June 2011 Parma excised the option to buy half of the registration rights of Abbracciante for €250,000 in a 5-year contract. Abbracciante himself was promoted to the under-20 reserve team in 2011–12 season. He remained in Parma for the reserve in 2012–13 season, but the age limit was decreased to under-19 by Lega Serie A. The co-ownership of the registration rights was renewed in June 2012 and again in June 2013.

On 25 July 2013 he was signed by the third division club L'Aquila in a temporary deal. He made his debut on 4 August 2013 in 2013–14 Coppa Italia, against former club Frosinone. Abbracciante played his first match (and so far last) of the season in round 1 against Prato. He was the substitute of Marco Frediani. In June 2014 Parma acquired Abbracciante from Frosinone outright for free.

=== Lega Pro clubs ===
On 1 September 2014 Abbracciante was transferred to Lega Pro club Grosseto. On 9 January 2015 he was transferred to fellow third level club Ischia.
