= Luca Miracoli =

Italian footballer

Personal information
- Date of birth: 31 March 1992 (age 34)
- Place of birth: Genoa, Italy
- Height: 1.91 m (6 ft 3 in)
- Position: Forward

Team information
- Current team: Ligorna

Youth career
- Genoa

Senior career*
Years	Team	Apps	(Gls)
2011–2012	Valenzana Mado	38	(12)
2012–2015	Varese	26	(3)
2012–2014	→ Feralpisalò (loan)	59	(17)
2015–2016	Tours	19	(2)
2016–2017	Carrarese	34	(6)
2017−2018	Sambenedettese	34	(13)
2018−2019	Brescia	0	(0)
2019	→ Sicula Leonzio (loan)	14	(4)
2019–2020	Como	18	(2)
2020	→ Feralpisalò (loan)	4	(2)
2020–2022	Feralpisalò	67	(17)
2022–2023	Sangiuliano	37	(4)
2023–	Ligorna	30	(13)
- * Club domestic league appearances and goals as of 20 July 2023

Luca Miracoli (born 31 March 1992) is an Italian footballer who plays for Serie D club Ligorna as forward.

== Club career ==
He started his career in Valenzana, before joining Serie C side Feralpisalò for two seasons. After 17 goals in 59 matches, he made his Serie B debut with Varese, where he made 26 appearances and 3 goals. After the club relegation he joined the French team Tours, Ligue 2. He came back in Italy in 2016, signed by Carrarese.

In 2017 Miracoli joins Sambenedettese, in Serie C. After some criticism, he became top scorer of his team.

On 31 January 2019, he joined Sicula Leonzio on loan.

On 21 July 2019, he signed a 2-year contract with Como. On 31 January 2020, he returned to Feralpisalò on loan until the end of the 2019–20 season. On 29 July 2020, he moved to Feralpisalò on a permanent basis and signed a 3-year contract.
