= Ignazio Carta =

Italian footballer

Personal information
- Date of birth: 18 May 1991 (age 35)
- Place of birth: Cagliari, Italy
- Height: 1.75 m (5 ft 9 in)
- Position: Defender

Youth career
- Cagliari

Senior career*
Years	Team	Apps	(Gls)
2011–2012	Latina	6	(0)
2012–2017	Savona	94	(5)
2017–2019	Vis Pesaro	31	(3)
2019	Sangiustese	14	(0)
2019–2020	Carpi	20	(1)

International career
2006	Italy U16	4	(0)
- * Club domestic league appearances and goals as of 16 February 2020

Ignazio Carta (born 18 May 1991) is an Italian footballer who plays as a defender.

== Club career ==
On 29 January 2019, he joined Serie D club Sangiustese.

On 2 August 2019, he signed with Carpi.

== Domestic League Records ==
Year	Competition	Apps	Goal
2011-2012	Serie C1	6	0
2012-13	Serie C2	28	3
Total		12	1
