= Nebil Caidi =

Italian football defender

Personal information
- Date of birth: 25 September 1988 (age 38)
- Place of birth: Ravenna, Emilia-Romagna, Italy
- Height: 1.83 m (6 ft 0 in)
- Position: Defender

Team information
- Current team: USD Classe

Youth career
- –2006: Cesena

Senior career*
Years	Team	Apps	(Gls)
2006–2011	Cesena	2	(0)
2008–2009	→ Valenzana (loan)	27	(1)
2009–2010	→ Giacomense (loan)	30	(2)
2010–2011	→ Pavia (loan)	21	(1)
2011–2012	Pavia	7	(0)
2012–2019	Teramo	134	(9)
2019	Picerno	14	(1)
2020–2021	Ravenna	30	(2)
2021	Cattolica	0	(0)
2021–	USD Classe		
- * Club domestic league appearances and goals as of 12 September 2021

Nebil Caidi (born 25 September 1988) is an Italian of Moroccan origin football defender who plays for amateur-level side USD Classe.

Caidi spent most of his career playing as a defender for various Italian clubs across Serie A, B and Serie C, representing teams such as Cesena, Ravenna FC, Teramo, AZ Picerno.

== Club career ==
A Cesena youth product, he also played for Teramo between 2012 and 2019.

On 14 December 2019, he agreed on a 1.5-year contract with Ravenna.
