= Loris Damonte =

Italian professional football player

Personal information
- Date of birth: 5 August 1990 (age 36)
- Place of birth: Savona, Italy
- Height: 1.83 m (6 ft 0 in)
- Position: Central midfielder

Team information
- Current team: Ligorna

Youth career
- 2005–2009: Genoa

Senior career*
Years	Team	Apps	(Gls)
2009–2010	Genoa	0	(0)
2009–2010	→ Alessandria (loan)	18	(0)
2010–2011	Alessandria	28	(6)
2011–2015	Varese	71	(4)
2014–2015	→ Messina (loan)	35	(2)
2015–2016	Pistoiese	26	(1)
2016–2017	Sambenedettese	37	(1)
2018	Gavorrano	18	(4)
2018–2019	Albissola	23	(2)
2019–2021	Renate	56	(0)
2021–2022	Feralpisalò	20	(0)
2022–	Ligorna	0	(0)
- * Club domestic league appearances and goals as of 24 April 2022

Loris Damonte (born 5 August 1990) is an Italian professional football player currently playing for Serie D team Ligorna.

== Club career ==
On 31 August 2016 Damonte was sold to fellow Lega Pro club Sambenedettese in a 1-year contract, with Nadir Minotti moved to Pistoiese.

On 9 July 2018, he was signed by Albissola.

On 29 July 2019, he joined Renate.

On 12 July 2021, Damonte signed for Feralpisalò.
