= Luca Del Papa =

Italian footballer

Personal information
- Date of birth: 7 February 1994 (age 32)
- Place of birth: Montesilvano, Italy
- Height: 1.94 m (6 ft 4 1/2 in)
- Position: Forward

Youth career
- Pescara
- 2010–2013: Juventus

Senior career*
Years	Team	Apps	(Gls)
2013–2015	Juventus	0	(0)
2013	→ Honvéd II (loan)	5	(0)
2013–2014	→ Chieti (loan)	0	(0)
- * Club domestic league appearances and goals

Luca Del Papa (born 7 February 1994) is an Italian footballer who plays as a forward.

== Career ==
Born in Montesilvano, in the Province of Pescara, Abruzzo region, Del Papa started his career at Delfino Pescara 1936. On 5 August 2010 he was signed by Juventus in a co-ownership deal worth €300,000 over a 3-year contract, as part of the deal that transferred Riccardo Maniero to Pescara for €450,000. Del Papa was a member of Juve's U17 team during the 2010–11 season, as well as its reserve team during the 2011–12 season. However, he only played once for the latter due to injury. At age 18 he signed a new 3-year contract with Juventus. Circa January 2013 Del Papa left for the Hungarian club Budapest Honvéd FC (re-joining Juve teammate Raffaele Alcibiade); however, he was only able to play for their second team. On 19 June 2013 Del Papa was acquired by Juventus outright, with Maniero moved to Abruzzo in the same formula.

On 28 August 2013 Del Papa and Alberto Gallinetta were signed by Lega Pro Seconda Divisione club Chieti from Juventus. Del Papa failed to play any game for the first team of the relegated side.
