= Alessio Briglia =

Italian footballer (born 1988)

Personal information
- Date of birth: 22 December 1988 (age 37)
- Place of birth: Italy
- Position: Midfielder

Team information
- Current team: Cesena

Youth career
- Verona

Senior career*
Years	Team	Apps	(Gls)
2007–2011	Bellaria	79	(1)
2008	→ Canavese (loan)	1	(0)
2011–	Cesena	0	(0)
- * Club domestic league appearances and goals

Alessio Briglia (born 22 December 1988) is an Italian footballer who plays as a midfielder for Serie A team Cesena.

== Career ==
Briglia started his career at Hellas Verona F.C. and was a member of its Primavera youth team in 2006–07 season. His contract was not renewed on 30 June 2007 and he joined Bellaria – Igea Marina in free transfer.

After the end of 2010–11 Lega Pro Seconda Divisione he joined Serie A team Cesena and joined the pre-season camp.
