= Sorin Rădoi (footballer, born 1990) =

Romanian footballer

Personal information
- Full name: Sorin Ionel Rădoi
- Date of birth: 16 January 1990 (age 36)
- Place of birth: Santarcangelo di Romagna, Italy
- Height: 1.82 m (6 ft 0 in)
- Position: Forward

Team information
- Current team: Forlimpopoli Calcio

Youth career
- Argeș Pitești
- Forlì
- –2009: Cesena

Senior career*
Years	Team	Apps	(Gls)
2009–2011	Santarcangelo	54	(13)
2011	Siena	0	(0)
2011–2013	Pavia	1	(0)
2012	→ Valenzana (loan)	0	(0)
2013–2015	Santarcangelo	40	(5)
2014	→ Rimini (loan)	9	(1)
2015–2016	Ravenna	34	(6)
2016	Cuneo	6	(1)
2016–2017	Pinerolo	16	(5)
2017	Forlì	11	(2)
2017–2018	Lentigione Calcio	14	(5)
2018–2019	Delta Rovigo	12	(1)
2019–2020	ASD Diegaro		
2020–2021	Fiorentino	10	(3)
2021	USD Classe		
2021–2022	ACD Gambettola		
2022	ASD Gabicce Gradara		
2023	ACD Gambettola		
2023–	Forlimpopoli Calcio		
- * Club domestic league appearances and goals as of 19 October 2021

Sorin Ionel Rădoi (born 16 January 1990) is an Italian-born Romanian professional footballer who currently plays for Forlimpopoli Calcio.

== Biography ==
Rădoi started his professional career at Santarcangelo, where he won 2010–11 Serie D Group F. In June 2011 he was signed by Siena for €55,000. On the same day he left for A.C. Pavia for a peppercorn of €500. On 31 January 2012 Rădoi left for Valenzana in temporary deal. In June 2012 Siena gave up the remain 50% registration rights to Pavia.

After no appearance for Pavia in 2012–13 Lega Pro Prima Divisione, Rădoi returned to Santarcangelo in co-ownership deal, with Andrea Parodi left for Pavia from Santarcangelo in a temporary deal. In June 2013 Pavia also gave up the remain 50% registration rights. Circa 9 January 2014 he left for Rimini.

== Honours ==
Santarcangelo

- Serie D: 2010–11
