= Alessandro De Leidi =

Italian footballer (born 1991)

Personal information
- Date of birth: 23 April 1991 (age 35)
- Place of birth: Bergamo, Italy
- Height: 1.81 m (5 ft 11 in)
- Position: Defender

Youth career
- Atalanta

Senior career*
Years	Team	Apps	(Gls)
2010–2012	Atalanta	0	(0)
2011–2012	→ Foggia (loan)	11	(0)
2012–2013	Barletta	21	(0)
2013–2016	Cittadella	43	(0)
2016–2017	Como	13	(1)
2017–2018	Fondi	4	(0)
- * Club domestic league appearances and goals as of 21 January 2018

Alessandro De Leidi (born 23 April 1991) is an Italian footballer who plays as a defender.

== Club career ==
Born in Bergamo, De Leidi graduated from hometown's Atalanta's youth system. In June 2011 he joined Foggia on loan, making his senior debuts with the Serie C1 side he closed his first season among the professionals with 22 league appearances. On 13 July 2012 he moved to Barletta in a co-ownership deal. With the team he disputed another 22 games of the Lega Pro Prima Divisione.

After appearing regularly during the season, Barletta bought the other half of De Leidi's rights on 21 June 2013. However, two months later, he joined Cittadella in Serie B. He played for Cittadella for 3 seasons collecting 35 appearances in total in Serie B and he disputed 6 games in Lega Pro Prima Divisione.

== Domestic League Records ==
Year	Competition	Apps	Goal
2010-2011	Serie B	0	0
2011-2012	Serie C1	22	0
2011-2013	Serie C1	32	0
2013-2014	Serie B	9	0
2014-2015	Serie B	26	0
2015-2016	Lega Pro	11	0
Total		100	0
