= Leonardo Terigi =

Italian footballer (born 1991)

Personal information
- Date of birth: 21 March 1991 (age 35)
- Place of birth: Lucca, Italy
- Height: 1.89 m (6 ft 2 1/2 in)
- Position: Defender

Team information
- Current team: Ravenna
- Number: 3

Youth career
- Genoa

Senior career*
Years	Team	Apps	(Gls)
2010–2014	Crotone	4	(0)
2012–2013	→ Carpi (loan)	35	(1)
2013–2014	→ Grosseto (loan)	26	(1)
2014–2016	Alessandria	27	(2)
2016–2018	Siena	22	(0)
2018–2020	Pistoiese	62	(1)
2020–2022	Siena	38	(3)
2022–	Ravenna	16	(0)
- * Club domestic league appearances and goals as of 21 September 2022

Leonardo Terigi (born 21 March 1991) is an Italian footballer who plays as a defender for Serie C Group B club Ravenna.

== Career ==
Born in Lucca, Tuscany, Terigi started his career at Ligurian club Genoa. In July 2010, Terigi was loaned to the Serie B club Crotone with option to purchase. Terigi played three times for the first team in 2010–11 Serie B.

In June 2011, Terigi was included in the transfer of Kevin Vinetot. Half of the registration rights of Terigi was valued €50,000. In January 2012, Terigi was signed by Carpi. In June 2012, the co-ownership deal of Vinetot and Terigi were renewed; Terigi participated in 2012 pre-season camp and he received number 13 shirt for new season. However, on 30 August Terigi left for Carpi again. Terigi won promotion to Serie B with Carpi.

In June 2013, Crotone still lacked incentive to buy Terigi outright, thus the co-ownership was renewed. He was sent to Grosseto of the third division in a temporary deal on 22 August. On 20 June 2014, Genoa gave up the remaining 50 percent registration rights of Terigi, as well as Crotone gave up the remain rights of Vinetot.

On 11 July 2014, he was sold to Lega Pro club Alessandria.

Since the summer of 2016, playing for Robur Siena.

On 30 January 2018, he joined Pistoiese. On 3 July 2018, he signed a contract extension until 2020.

On 24 August 2022, Terigi signed with Serie D club Ravenna.
