= Enrico Verachi =

Italian footballer (born 1990)

Personal information
- Date of birth: January 18, 1990 (age 36)
- Place of birth: Nuoro, Italy
- Height: 1.80 m (5 ft 11 in)
- Position: Midfielder

Team information
- Current team: ASD Marina di Ragusa

Youth career
- Cagliari

Senior career*
Years	Team	Apps	(Gls)
2009–2010	Cagliari	1	(0)
2010–2011	San Marino	22	(1)
2011–2012	Siracusa	1	(0)
2012	Cagliari	0	(0)
2012–2014	Como	38	(0)
2014–2015	Savona	1	(0)
2015	Ischia	6	(0)
2015–2016	Nuorese	25	(3)
2016–2017	Arzachena	20	(2)
2017–2018	Nuorese	33	(3)
2018–2019	US San Teodoro		
2019–	ASD Marina di Ragusa	15	(0)
- * Club domestic league appearances and goals as of 13:52, 23 March 2020 (UTC)

Enrico Verachi (born January 18, 1990) is an Italian professional football player. Currently, he plays for Serie D club ASD Marina di Ragusa as a midfielder.

== Career ==
Verachi made his Serie A debut for Cagliari Calcio on 28 March 2010 in a match against UC Sampdoria.

=== Marina di Ragusa ===
In November 2019, Verachi joined Serie D club ASD Marina di Ragusa.
