= Riccardo Regno =

Italian footballer

Personal information
- Date of birth: 12 August 1992 (age 34)
- Place of birth: Bologna, Italy
- Height: 1.79 m (5 ft 10 1/2 in)
- Position: Defender

Team information
- Current team: Pro Patria

Youth career
- Bologna

Senior career*
Years	Team	Apps	(Gls)
2011–2015	Livorno	0	(0)
2011–2012	→ Portogruaro (loan)	23	(0)
2012–2013	→ Gubbio (loan)	18	(0)
2014–2015	→ Barletta (loan)	12	(0)
2015	Pro Patria	4	(0)
2016	Ravenna	8	(0)
2017	Cailungo	5	(0)
- * Club domestic league appearances and goals

Riccardo Regno (born 12 August 1992) is an Italian former footballer who most recently played for Cailungo.

== Biography ==
=== Bologna ===
Born in Bologna, Emilia–Romagna, Regno started his career at Bologna F.C. 1909. Regno was a member of the reserve team from 2009 to 2011 in national "spring" league, but also made his reserve debut in 2008–09 season, when he was a member of the U17 team for national student league (Allievi).

=== Livorno ===
In June 2011, Regno was a piece weight to sign Nico Pulzetti. Pulzetti was valued €3.3 million while Regno was valued an aggressive price €1.65 million, which made Pulzetti 's deal involved €1.65 million cash only. Regno had a one-year left in his apprentice contract with Bologna.

On 23 August 2011 Regno left for Italian third division club Portogruaro.

On 17 July 2012 Regno left for Gubbio.

In 2013, he returned to Livorno, which the club had promoted to Serie A. He wore no.6 shirt. On 31 January 2014 he left for Pontedera. In summer 2014 he was signed by Barletta.

=== Pro Patria ===
On 16 September 2015 Regno and Mirko Bigazzi were signed by Pro Patria.

=== International career ===
Regno was an unused member of Italy U16 team in 2007–08 season. In 2008–09 season he was included in the U17 team training camp. Regno also remained in the U18 team with the same age group in 2009–10 season, however yet to make a debut.
