= Nico Pulzetti =

Italian footballer (born 1984)

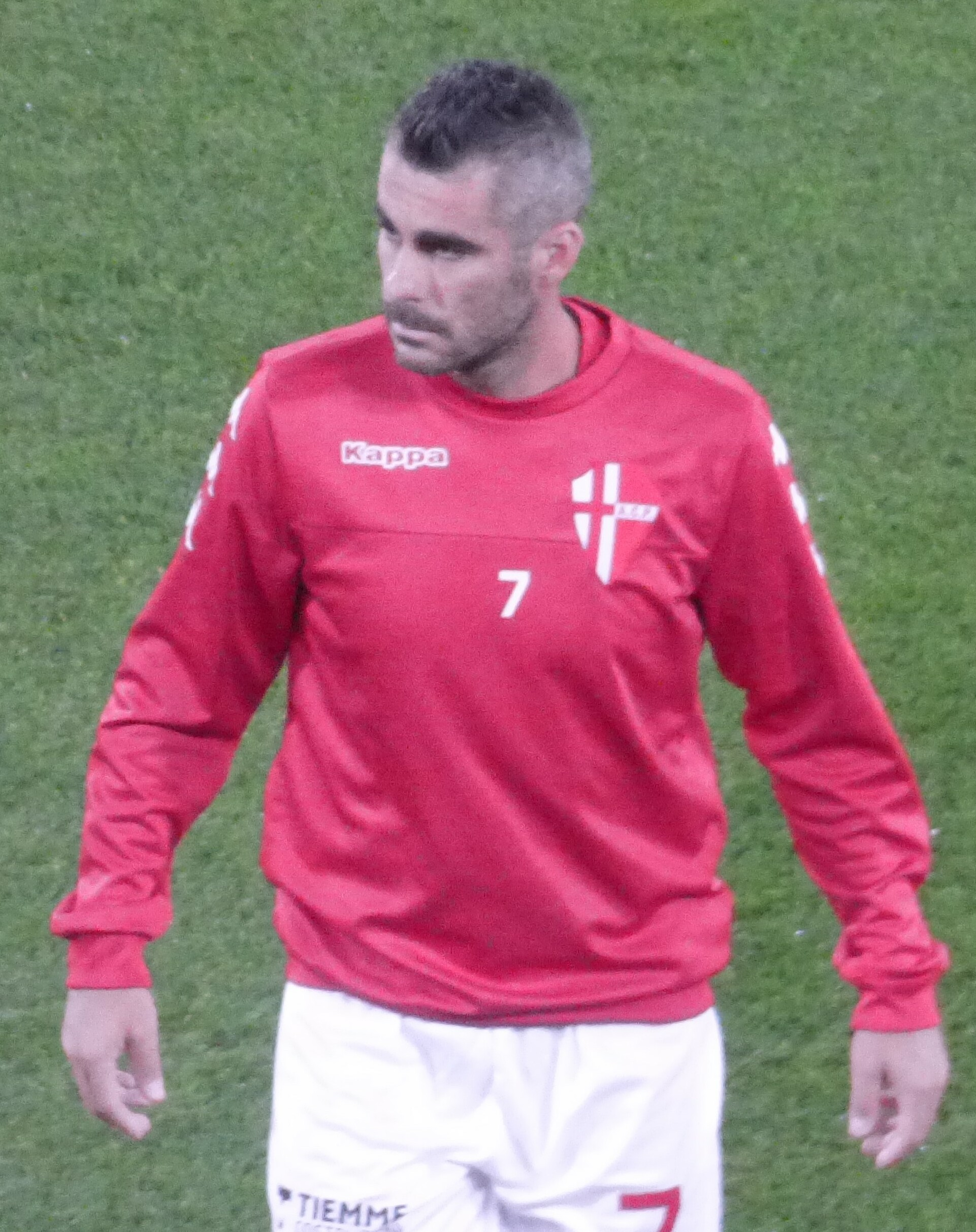
- Pulzetti in 2018

Personal information
- Date of birth: 13 February 1984 (age 42)
- Place of birth: Rimini, Italy
- Height: 1.77 m (5 ft 9 1/2 in)
- Position: Midfielder

Youth career
- Cesena

Senior career*
| Years | Team | Apps | (Gls) |
| 2003–2004 | Cesena | 3 | (0) |
| 2004–2005 | Castelnuovo | 31 | (5) |
| 2005–2007 | Verona | 68 | (3) |
| 2007–2011 | Livorno | 93 | (5) |
| 2010–2011 | → Bari (loan) | 15 | (0) |
| 2011 | → Chievo (loan) | 7 | (1) |
| 2011–2016 | Bologna | 31 | (0) |
| 2013–2014 | → Siena (loan) | 37 | (7) |
| 2014–2015 | → Cesena (loan) | 9 | (1) |
| 2016–2017 | Spezia | 46 | (4) |
| 2017–2019 | Padova | 55 | (6) |
| 2019–2020 | Sandonà | | |
| 2020–2021 | Montebelluna | 14 | (0) |
| Total | | 409 | (32) |
- * Club domestic league appearances and goals

Nico Pulzetti (born 13 February 1984) is an Italian former professional footballer who played as a midfielder.

He also played for Cesena, Castelnuovo, Verona, Livorno, Bari, Chievo and Siena.

== Club career ==
Pulzetti was signed by A.S. Livorno Calcio from Hellas Verona F.C. for €1.5 million in 2007.

On 29 June 2011, Pulzetti was signed by Bologna for €3.3 million, with half of the fee paid via Riccardo Regno. He signed a four-year contract worth about €320,000 net annually, plus bonuses. He played a full season with Bologna in 2011–12, but appeared only occasionally the following season. He spent the 2013–14 season on loan at Serie B club Siena, and returned to his first club, Cesena, for 2014–15, also on loan.

On 7 January 2016, Pulzetti was signed by Spezia for an undisclosed fee.

On 4 July 2019, he moved to Eccellenza side Sandonà.
