= Luigi Palumbo =

Italian footballer

Personal information
- Date of birth: 30 May 1991 (age 35)
- Place of birth: Aversa, Italy
- Height: 1.84 m (6 ft 0 in)
- Position: Centre back

Team information
- Current team: Vis Afragolese

Youth career
- Arzano 99
- 2006–2007: Persicetana
- 2007–2011: Parma

Senior career*
| Years | Team | Apps | (Gls) |
| 2011–2015 | Cesena | 0 | (0) |
| 2011–2013 | → Fondi (loan) | 60 | (1) |
| 2013–2014 | → Arzanese (loan) | 23 | (1) |
| 2015 | → Gorica (loan) | 10 | (0) |
| 2015–2017 | Messina | 34 | (1) |
| 2017–2018 | Correggese | 7 | (0) |
| 2018– | Vis Afragolese | | |
- * Club domestic league appearances and goals as of 15:21, 19 February 2020 (UTC)

Luigi Palumbo (born 30 May 1991) is an Italian footballer who currently plays as a defender for Vis Afragolese.

== Career ==
=== Youth career ===
Born in Aversa, Campania started his career at Arzano 99. He received a call-up to Campania Regional Junior–Student mixed (Italian: Giovanissimi–Allievi) Representative Team for 2006 National "Spring" Cup (Italian: Coppa Nazionale Primavera, not to be confused with Coppa Italia Primavera) Palumbo won the cup as unused member. He then left for Persicetana, a team located in San Giovanni in Persiceto, Emilia–Romagna region. He was selected to Emilia–Romagna regional Allievi team for the 2007 edition of 2007 Coppa Nazionale Primavera. Palumbo left for Parma in 2007. He was the member of the reserve in national "spring" league from 2008 to 2011 after a season with Parma's U17 team in national student league (Italian: Campionato Nazionale Allievi).

=== Cesena ===
In June 2011, Palumbo was swapped with Thomas Fabbri of A.C. Cesena. Both players was signed by co-ownership deal and valued the 50% registration rights for €1 million. Both clubs had a selling profit of nearly €2 million, however the increase only in form of intangible asset (the contract value of T.Fabbri and L.Palumbo) Both players signed a 4-year contract.

L.Palumbo was loaned to Fondi for 2011–12 season, rejoining Parma team-mate Loris Formuso, Andrea Gasparri, Abel Gigli, Domenico Iovinella and Daniele Bernasconi. The loan of Palumbo was renewed for 2012–13 season. The club also signed Zsolt Tamási and Giuseppe Pacini from Parma.

On 20 June 2013 Palumbo joined Cesena outright for €1.5 million, however still part of the mega swap deal. (Note: In 2012–13 financial year, Cesena signed Brandão (on loan with €1.8 million subsidy), Rossi (on loan with €1.2 million subsidy), Palumbo (co-ownership resolution for €1.5 million), Del Pivo (co-ownership resolution for €1.5 million), Adorni (co-ownership for €1 million); sold Parolo (loan for €1 million), Benalouane (co-ownership for €600,000), Paolini (co-ownership for €1 million), Lapadula (co-ownership resolution for €1.4 million); The signing of Parolo to Parma and Milan Đurić returned to Cesena were arranged to July 2013 in 2013–14 financial year for €1 million and €500.)

In July 2013 Palumbo moved to Arzanese.

On 31 January 2015 Palumbo and Felice Di Cecco were moved to Slovenian club ND Gorica in temporary deals.

=== Messina ===
On 24 August 2015 Palumbo was signed by Messina.
