= Santarcangelo Calcio =

Italian football club

Santarcangelo
- Full name: Santarcangelo Calcio
- Founded: 1926
- Dissolved: 2019
- Ground: Stadio Valentino Mazzola; Santarcangelo di Romagna, Italy
- Capacity: 3,000
- Chairman: Roberto Brolli
- Manager: Daniele Galloppa
- League: Seconda Categoria
- 2021–22: Terza Categoria Forlì-Cesena Group B, 1st (Promoted)
- Website: http://www.santarcangelocalcio.net
| Home colours | Away colours |

Santarcangelo Calcio was an Italian association football club, based in Santarcangelo di Romagna, Emilia-Romagna. The club was founded as a sports association, A.S.D. Santarcangelo, in 1926.

The club did not sign up for the Eccellenza in 2019, and was therefore dissolved.

== History ==
The club was founded as A.S.D. Santarcangelo as a sports association in 1926. It was the most supported club within the Santarcangelo di Romagna area.

In 2009, non-profit association SquadraMia acquired 10% of the club shares. In the season 2010–11, Santarcangelo won the Group F of Serie D and was promoted to Lega Pro Seconda Divisione for the first time. After the 2011–12 Lega Pro Seconda Divisione season, the club terminated its agreement with SquadraMia.

Following a fifth place in the 2013–14 Lega Pro Seconda Divisione, Santarcangelo was admitted to the inaugural season of the unified third tier of Italian football, the 2014–15 Lega Pro.

== Colors and symbol ==
The society used yellow and blue as its colors, and Romagna's rooster as the team symbol.

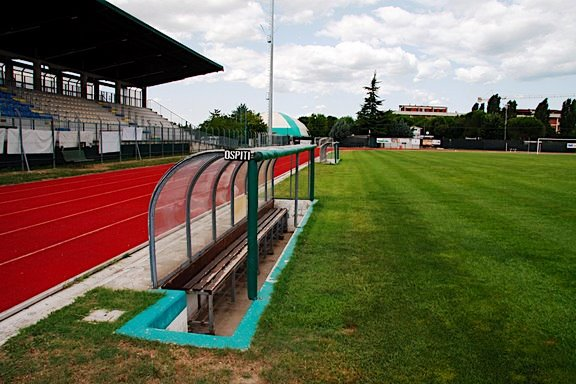
A view from the field of "Valentino Mazzola"

The team's 3,000 home stadium is named in memory of Valentino Mazzola.

== Players ==
=== Former players ===
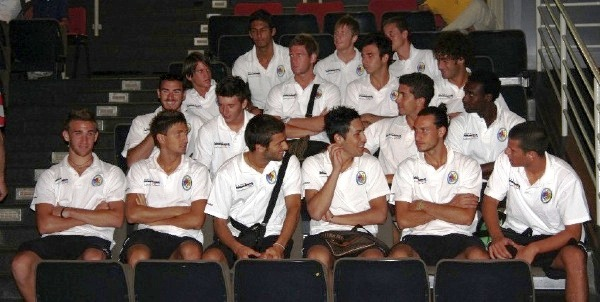
Players of ASD Santarcangelo during the official presentation of the 2009/10 season
