= List of Italian football transfers summer 2014 (co-ownership) =

This is a list of Italian football transfers for co-ownership resolutions, for the 2014–15 season, from and to Serie A and Serie B.

According to Article 102 bis of NOIF (Norme Organizzative Interne della F.I.G.C), the co-ownership deals had to be confirmed each year. The deal could expire, be renewed, or one of the co-owners could buy back the other 50% of the player's rights. Deals that failed to form an agreement after the deadline were defined by auction between the two clubs; both clubs would submit their bid in a sealed envelope. Non-submission meant the player's rights would go to the other team for free. The mother club could sell their rights to third parties in a loan deal, such as Emiliano Viviano in 2010, Andrea Masiello and Abdoulay Konko in January 2008, Massimo Volta in circa 2007–08, and most recently Nicolas Viola in 2013.

== Serie A deals ==
Deals involves at least one 2014–15 Serie A clubs

Date	Name	Co-Owner (active)	Passive club (Mother club)	Result	Fee
20 June 2014	Daniele Abbracciante	Parma	Frosinone	ND (Parma)	Free
19 June 2014	Francesco Acerbi	Sassuolo	Genoa	Renewed	—
16 June 2014	Davide Adorni	Cesena	Parma	Cesena	Undisclosed
20 June 2014	(Ghana) Daniel Kofi Agyei	Benevento	Fiorentina	Renewed	—
20 June 2014	Michelangelo Albertazzi	Verona	Milan	Milan	Undisclosed
19 June 2014	Simone Aldrovandi	Chievo	Modena	Renewed	—
18 June 2014	Francesco Anacoura	Juventus	Parma	Renewed	—
20 June 2014	Valerio Anastasi	Reggiana	Chievo	Chievo	Undisclosed
19 June 2014	(Argentina) Mariano Andújar	Napoli	Catania	Renewed	—
20 June 2014	Luca Antei	Sassuolo	Roma	Renewed	—
20 June 2014	(Colombia) Pablo Armero	Napoli	Udinese	Udinese	Undisclosed
20 June 2014	Gianluca Austoni	Aprilia	Sampdoria	ND (Aprilia)	Free
20 June 2014	Ivano Baldanzeddu	Spezia	Verona	ND (Spezia)	Free
20 June 2014	Andrea Bandini	Bologna	Inter	Inter	€1 million (swap deal)
20 June 2014	Federico Barba	Empoli	Roma	Renewed	—
19 June 2014	Luca Barlocco	Juventus	Atalanta	Renewed	—
20 June 2014	(Brazil) Paulo Vitor Barreto	Torino	Udinese	Torino	Undisclosed
19 June 2014	Nazzareno Belfasti	Pro Vercelli	Juventus	Renewed	—
19 June 2014	(Algeria) Ishak Belfodil	Inter	Parma	Parma	Undisclosed
20 June 2014	Nicola Bellomo	Chievo	Torino	Torino	Undisclosed
20 June 2014	Niccolò Belloni	Modena	Inter	Inter	Undisclosed
20 June 2014	Stefano Beltrame	Sampdoria	Juventus	Renewed	—
20 June 2014	(Tunisia) Yohan Benalouane	Parma	Cesena	Parma	Undisclosed
20 June 2014	Rocco Benci	Sorrento	Catania	ND (Sorrento)	Free
20 June 2014	Domenico Berardi	Sassuolo	Juventus	Renewed	—
20 June 2014	Andrea Bertolacci	Genoa	Roma	Renewed	—
20 June 2014	Davide Bertoncini	Frosinone	Genoa	ND (Frosinone)	Free
11 June 2014	Luca Bertoni	Carpi	Milan	Carpi	Undisclosed
20 June 2014	(France) Jonathan Biabiany	Parma	Sampdoria	Parma	Undisclosed
18 June 2014	Matteo Bianchetti	Verona	Inter	Renewed	—
20 June 2014	Niko Bianconi	Juventus	Vicenza	Vicenza	€600,000 (part of Pinsoglio)
20 June 2014	Cristiano Biraghi	Cittadella	Inter	Inter	€610,000
19 June 2014	Luca Bittante	Avellino	Fiorentina	Renewed	—
20 June 2014	(Iceland) Birkir Bjarnason	Sampdoria	Pescara	Pescara	Auction
20 June 2014	(Ghana) Richmond Boakye	Juventus	Genoa	Renewed	—
19 June 2014	Riccardo Bocalon	Venezia	Inter	Inter	Undisclosed
20 June 2014	Francesco Bonato	Castiglione	Chievo	ND (Castiglione)	Free
18 June 2014	Filippo Boniperti	Parma	Juventus	Parma	€700,000 (swap deal)
18 June 2014	(Portugal) Gonçalo Brandão	Parma	Siena	Siena	€1.1 million (swap deal)
19 June 2014	(Romania) Laurențiu Brănescu	Lanciano	Juventus	Renewed	—
20 June 2014	Andrea Brighenti	Cremonese	Parma	Renewed	—
20 June 2014	(Liechtenstein) Marcel Büchel	Juventus	Siena	Renewed	—
20 June 2014	Giuseppe Caccavallo	Parma	Crotone	ND (Parma)	Free
20 June 2014	Fabrizio Cacciatore	Verona	Sampdoria	Sampdoria	Auction
19 June 2014	Davide Cais	Juventus	Atalanta	Renewed	—
19 June 2014	Luca Calapai	Modena	Catania	Renewed	—
20 June 2014	Francesco Calcagno	Savona	Parma	ND (Savona)	Free
20 June 2014	Marco Calderoni	Bari	Chievo	Renewed	—
19 June 2014	Simone Calvano	AlbinoLeffe	Verona	Verona	€500
13 June 2014	Carlo Calvetti	Pavia	Verona	Verona	Undisclosed
20 June 2014	Tommaso Cancellotti	Pro Vercelli	Sampdoria	ND (Pro Vercelli)	Free
17 June 2014	Antonio Candreva	Lazio	Udinese	Lazio	Undisclosed
20 June 2014	Michele Canini	Atalanta	Genoa	ND (Atalanta)	Free
20 June 2014	Alessandro Cannataro	Livorno	Inter	Inter	Auction
20 June 2014	Alessandro Capello	Inter	Bologna	Bologna	€2.5 million (swap deal)
20 June 2014	Roberto Cappai	Castel Rigone	Catania	ND (Castel Rigone)	Free
20 June 2014	Gianluca Caprari	Pescara	Roma	Renewed	—
20 June 2014	Federico Carraro	Pavia	Fiorentina	ND (Pavia)	Free
18 June 2014	Andrea Casarini	Parma	Novara	Renewed	—
20 June 2014	Giovanbattista Catalano	Parma	Lamezia	Lamezia	Undisclosed
20 June 2014	Andrea Catellani	Spezia	Catania	ND (Spezia)	Free
20 June 2014	Tommaso Ceccarelli	FeralpiSalò	Lazio	Lazio	Undisclosed
20 June 2014	Diego Cenciarelli	Teramo	Fiorentina	ND (Teramo)	Free
20 June 2014	Luca Ceppitelli	Parma	Bari	Renewed	—
19 June 2014	Edoardo Ceria	Atalanta	Juventus	Renewed	—
19 June 2014	(Ghana) Raman Chibsah	Sassuolo	Parma	Sassuolo	€5.75 million
20 June 2014	Luca Cigarini	Atalanta	Napoli	Atalanta	Undisclosed
20 June 2014	Davide Cinaglia	FeralpiSalò	Torino	Torino	Undisclosed
20 June 2014	Matteo Cincilla	Renate	Parma	ND (Renate)	Free
18 June 2014	Mauro Cioffi	Parma	Crotone	Parma	Undisclosed
19 June 2014	Andrea Cocco	Verona	AlbinoLeffe	Verona	€500
20 June 2014	Davide Colomba	Ascoli	Parma	Parma	Undisclosed
17 June 2014	Gianmario Comi	Milan	Torino	Renewed	—
19 June 2014	Manuel Coppola	Siena	Parma	Renewed	—
20 June 2014	Elia Cortesi	Bassano	Atalanta	ND (Bassano)	Free
20 June 2014	Nicola Cosentini	Gavorrano	Parma	ND (Gavorrano)	Free
19 June 2014	Lorenzo Crisetig	Parma	Inter	Inter	€4.75 million
20 June 2014	Michel Cruciani	Casertana	Chievo	ND (Casertana)	Free
19 June 2014	(Colombia) Juan Cuadrado	Fiorentina	Udinese	Fiorentina	€12 million
20 June 2014	Raffaele Dalle Vedove	Lumezzane	Inter	ND (Lumezzane)	Free
20 June 2014	Loris Damonte	Varese	Genoa	Varese	Undisclosed
18 June 2014	Federico Davighi	Novara	Parma	Renewed	—
20 June 2014	Andrea De Falco	Bari	Chievo	Bari	—
20 June 2014	Giuseppe De Luca	Atalanta	Varese	Renewed	—
20 June 2014	Alessandro De Vena	Viareggio	Napoli	ND (Viareggio)	Free
19 June 2014	Pasquale De Vita	Verona	Atalanta	Verona	Undisclosed
20 June 2014	(France) Gregoire Defrel	Cesena	Parma	Renewed	—
20 June 2014	Lorenzo Degeri	Cremonese	Inter	ND (Cremonese)	Free
20 June 2014	(Brazil) Yago Del Piero	Cesena	Inter	ND (Cesena)	Free
20 June 2014	Francesco Della Rocca	Palermo	Bologna	Renewed	—
20 June 2014	Paolo Dellafiore	Siena	Parma	Renewed	—
20 June 2014	Federico Di Francesco	Parma	Pescara	ND (Parma)	Free
20 June 2014	Matteo Di Gennaro	Parma	Ascoli	Parma	Undisclosed
20 June 2014	(Croatia) Damjan Djoković	Bologna	Cesena	Renewed	—
20 June 2014	Andrea Doninelli	Benevento	Genoa	ND (Vicenza)	Free
20 June 2014	Alfredo Donnarumma	Cittadella	Catania	ND (Cittadella)	Free
19 June 2014	Simone Emmanuello	Juventus	Atalanta	Renewed	—
18 June 2014	Thomas Fabbri	Parma	Cesena	Renewed	—
19 June 2014	Vittorio Fabris	FeralpiSalò	Parma	FeralpiSalò	Undisclosed
20 June 2014	Gianmarco Falasca	Salernitana	Lazio	Lazio	Undisclosed
20 June 2014	Alessandro Favalli	Parma	Cremonese	Renewed	—
18 June 2014	Francesco Fedato	Sampdoria	Catania	Renewed	—
20 June 2014	Marco Ferrara	Pergolettese	Inter	Inter	Auction
20 June 2014	Gian Marco Ferrari	Gubbio	Parma	Parma	€200,000
20 June 2014	Riccardo Fiamozzi	Varese	Torino	Varese	Auction
20 June 2014	Giuseppe Figliomeni	Latina	Parma	Latina	Free
18 June 2014	Vincenzo Fiorillo	Juventus	Sampdoria	Renewed	—
20 June 2014	Riccardo Fochesato	Pro Vercelli	Chievo	ND (Pro Vercelli)	Free
20 June 2014	Francesco Forte	Inter	Pisa	Renewed	—
17 June 2014	Michele Fossati	Gavorrano	Fiorentina	Fiorentina	Undisclosed
19 June 2014	Domenico Franco	Messina	Chievo	Chievo	Undisclosed
19 June 2014	Manolo Gabbiadini	Sampdoria	Juventus	Renewed	—
19 June 2014	Gianmarco Gabbianelli	Pro Patria	Inter	Inter	Undisclosed
19 June 2014	(Brazil) Denílson Gabionetta	Parma	Crotone	Renewed	—
20 June 2014	Iacopo Galli	Pontedera	Livorno	ND (Pontedera)	Free
20 June 2014	Niccolò Galli	Padova	Parma	ND (Padova)	Free
18 June 2014	Alberto Gallinetta	Juventus	Parma	Juventus	€700,000 (swap deal)
19 June 2014	Salvatore Gallo	Venezia	Chievo	Chievo	Undisclosed
18 June 2014	Alberto Galuppo	Siena	Parma	Parma	€1.1 million (swap deal)
20 June 2014	Luca Garritano	Cesena	Inter	Renewed	—
20 June 2014	Andrea Gasbarro	Pontedera	Livorno	ND (Pontedera)	Free
20 June 2014	Emanuele Gatto	Lumezzane	Torino	Torino	Undisclosed
20 June 2014	Matteo Gaudiano	Arzanese	Parma	ND (Arzanese)	Free
20 June 2014	Matteo Gentili	Vicenza	Atalanta	ND (Vicenza)	Free
20 June 2014	Sante Giacinti	Arzanese	Chievo	ND (Arzanese)	Free
20 June 2014	Bryan Gioè	Grosseto	Livorno	ND (Grosseto)	Free
19 June 2014	(Brazil) Caio Secco	Crotone	Parma	Renewed	—
18 June 2014	Edoardo Goldaniga	Juventus	Palermo	Renewed	—
20 June 2014	Guido Gómez	Pro Vercelli	Sassuolo	Sassuolo	Undisclosed
17 June 2014	Lorenzo Gonnelli	Pontedera	Livorno	Livorno	Undisclosed
13 June 2014	Stefano Gori	Milan	Brescia	Milan	Undisclosed
20 June 2014	(France) Prince-Désir Gouano	Atalanta	Juventus	Atalanta	€1 million
20 June 2014	Daniele Gragnoli	Parma	Ascoli	Parma	Undisclosed
20 June 2014	Paolo Grossi	Verona	Siena	Renewed	—
20 June 2014	Davide Guglielmotti	Pro Patria	Inter	ND (Pro Patria)	Free
20 June 2014	Manuel Gullotta	Brescia	Inter	ND (Brescia)	Free
20 June 2014	Marco Guzzo	Siena	Verona	Renewed	—
20 June 2014	Yonese Hanine	Ascoli	Chievo	ND (Ascoli)	Free
10 June 2014	(Argentina) Mauro Icardi	Inter	Sampdoria	Inter	€6.5 million
18 June 2014	Ciro Immobile	Torino	Juventus	Torino	€8 million
20 June 2014	Riccardo Improta	Chievo	Genoa	Genoa	Undisclosed
20 June 2014	Andrea Ingegneri	Cesena	Bologna	Renewed	—
20 June 2014	Manuel Iori	Padova	Chievo	ND (Padova)	Free
20 June 2014	(Chile) Mauricio Isla	Juventus	Udinese	Juventus	€4.5 million
20 June 2014	Luca Isoardi	Bra	Torino	ND (Bra)	Free
20 June 2014	Armando Izzo	Avellino	Napoli	Avellino	Auction
20 June 2014	(Brazil) Jefferson	Vicenza	Udinese	ND (Vicenza)	Free
19 June 2014	Jorginho	Napoli	Verona	Renewed	—
20 June 2014	(Slovenia) Rene Krhin	Bologna	Inter	Inter	€1.2 million
20 June 2014	(Slovenia) Jasmin Kurtić	Sassuolo	Palermo	Sassuolo	€1.4 million
20 June 2014	Giuliano Laezza	Gubbio	Parma	Gubbio	€200,000
20 June 2014	Eugenio Lamanna	Siena	Genoa	Renewed	—
19 June 2014	Simon Laner	Verona	AlbinoLeffe	Verona	€500
18 June 2014	Eric Lanini	Palermo	Juventus	Renewed	—
20 June 2014	(Argentina) Marcelo Larrondo	Torino	Siena	Torino	Undisclosed
20 June 2014	Filippo Lauricella	Renate	Parma	ND (Renate)	Free
20 June 2014	(Slovenia) Dejan Lazarević	Chievo	Genoa	Chievo	Undisclosed
18 June 2014	Fabio Lebran	Crotone	Parma	Crotone	Undisclosed
19 June 2014	Alberto Libertazzi	Novara	Juventus	Renewed	—
20 June 2014	Alessandro Ligi	Parma	Crotone	Renewed	—
20 June 2014	(Croatia) Marko Livaja	Atalanta	Inter	Atalanta	Free
13 June 2014	Francesco Lodi	Genoa	Catania	Catania	Undisclosed
19 June 2014	Alessandro Longhi	Sassuolo	Chievo	Sassuolo	€1.65 million (swap deal)
20 June 2014	(Uruguay) Nicolás López	Udinese	Roma	Udinese	€2 million
10 June 2014	Filippo Lora	Cittadella	Milan	Cittadella	Undisclosed
18 June 2014	Massimo Loviso	Parma	Crotone	Parma	Undisclosed
20 June 2014	Ciro Lucchese	Parma	Teramo	ND (Parma)	Free
20 June 2014	Federico Maccarone	Barletta	Chievo	ND (Barletta)	Free
17 June 2014	Nicola Madonna	Spezia	Atalanta	Renewed	—
19 June 2014	(Iceland) Hörður Magnússon	Spezia	Juventus	Renewed	—
20 June 2014	Nicola Malaccari	Gubbio	Atalanta	ND (Gubbio)	Free
20 June 2014	Miloš Malivojević	Vicenza	Parma	Renewed	—
19 June 2014	Gianni Manfrin	Modena	Chievo	Renewed	—
18 June 2014	Matteo Mantovani	Crotone	Parma	Crotone	Undisclosed
20 June 2014	Diego Manzoni	Genoa	Parma	Renewed	—
20 June 2014	Gianluca Maran	Bassano	Catania	ND (Bassano)	Free
20 June 2014	Lorenzo Marchionni	Chievo	Ascoli	Chievo	Undisclosed
20 June 2014	Luca Marrone	Sassuolo	Juventus	Renewed	—
20 June 2014	(Brazil) Raphael Martinho	Verona	Catania	Catania	Undisclosed
19 June 2014	Alberto Masi	Ternana	Juventus	Renewed	—
20 June 2014	Andrea Mazzarani	Modena	Udinese	Udinese	Auction
19 June 2014	(Portugal) Pedro Filipe Mendes	Sassuolo	Parma	Parma	€2.5 million
20 June 2014	Giuseppe Messina	Pro Patria	Catania	ND (Pro Patria)	Free
20 June 2014	Umberto Miello	Monza	Torino	ND (Monza)	Free
20 June 2014	Francesco Migliore	Spezia	Verona	ND (Spezia)	Free
20 June 2014	Luca Miracoli	Varese	Genoa	Renewed	—
18 June 2014	Andrea Molinelli	Südtirol	Livorno	Livorno	Undisclosed
19 June 2014	Gabriele Moncini	Cesena	Juventus	Cesena	€750,000 (swap deal)
20 June 2014	Mattia Monticone	Lumezzane	Sampdoria	Lumezzane	Auction
19 June 2014	Daniele Mori	Brescia	Udinese	Udinese	€250
20 June 2014	Giulio Mulas	Parma	Siena	Renewed	—
20 June 2014	Francesco Nicastro	Rimini	Catania	ND (Rimini)	Free
20 June 2014	Alessandro Orchi	Catanzaro	Roma	ND (Catanzaro)	Free
20 June 2014	(Nigeria) Kelly Oviahon	Virtus Verona	Chievo	ND (Virtus Verona)	Free
19 June 2014	Davide Pacifico	Milan	Novara	ND (Milan)	Free
19 June 2014	Giuseppe Pacini	Parma	Siena	Renewed	—
20 June 2014	Simone Palermo	Cremonese	Parma	Renewed	—
19 June 2014	Alberto Paloschi	Chievo	Milan	Chievo	€3 million
20 June 2014	Giordano Pantano	Sorrento	Catania	ND (Sorrento)	Free
16 June 2014	Marco Paolini	Parma	Cesena	Parma	Undisclosed
20 June 2014	Andrea Pappaianni Lenzi	Alessandria	Parma	ND (Alessandria)	Free
20 June 2014	Lorenzo Pasqualini	Parma	Ascoli	Parma	Free
20 June 2014	Cristian Pasquato	Udinese	Juventus	Juventus	€1.5 million
20 June 2014	Simone Pecorini	Cittadella	Inter	Cittadella	Undisclosed
18 June 2014	Stefano Pellizzari	Juventus	Cesena	Juventus	€750,000 (swap deal)
20 June 2014	Enrico Pepe	Messina	Chievo	Renewed	—
16 June 2014	Filippo Perucchini	Lecce	Milan	Lecce	Undisclosed
20 June 2014	Stefano Pettinari	Crotone	Roma	Roma	€500,000
20 June 2014	(Brazil) Neuton Piccoli	Novara	Udinese	Udinese	Auction
20 June 2014	Carlo Pinsoglio	Vicenza	Juventus	Juventus	€700,000 (cash plus Bianconi)
12 June 2014	Riccardo Piscitelli	Benevento	Milan	Benevento	Undisclosed
9 June 2014	Andrea Poli	Milan	Sampdoria	Milan	€4 million (swap deal)
20 June 2014	Matteo Politano	Pescara	Roma	Renewed	—
20 June 2014	(Finland) Jonas Portin	Parma	Padova	ND (Parma)	Free
20 June 2014	Marcello Possenti	Reggiana	Atalanta	ND (Reggiana)	Free
18 June 2014	Giuseppe Prestia	Crotone	Parma	Parma	Undisclosed
20 June 2014	Luca Procacci	Parma	Gubbio	Parma	€200,000
20 June 2014	Mattia Proietti	Bassano	Juventus	ND (Bassano)	Free
19 June 2014	Raffaele Pucino	Sassuolo	Chievo	Chievo	€300,000 (swap deal)
20 June 2014	Antonino Ragusa	Pescara	Genoa	Renewed	—
20 June 2014	Francesco Rapisarda	Lamezia	Parma	Lamezia	Free
11 June 2014	Vasco Regini	Sampdoria	Empoli	Sampdoria	Undisclosed
20 June 2014	Vincenzo Richella	Foggia	Parma	ND (Foggia)	Free
20 June 2014	Andrea Romanò	Bologna	Inter	Inter	€1.3 million (swap deal)
20 June 2014	Niccolò Romero	Pavia	Genoa	ND (Pavia)	Free
20 June 2014	Mirko Ronchi	Parma	Ascoli	Renewed	—
20 June 2014	Raffaele Rosato	Savona	Parma	ND (Savona)	Free
19 June 2014	Andrea Rossi	Parma	Siena	Renewed	—
20 June 2014	Andrea Rossini	Parma	Cesena	Renewed	—
20 June 2014	(Switzerland) Jonathan Rossini	Sassuolo	Sampdoria	ND (Sassuolo)	Free
19 June 2014	Emanuele Rovini	Udinese	Empoli	Renewed	—
19 June 2014	Daniele Rugani	Juventus	Empoli	Renewed	—
19 June 2014	Giuseppe Ruggiero	Pro Vercelli	Juventus	Renewed	—
20 June 2014	(Portugal) Mário Rui	Empoli	Parma	ND (Empoli)	Free
20 June 2014	Simone Russini	Juventus	Ternana	Renewed	—
20 June 2014	Andrea Russotto	Catanzaro	Parma	ND (Catanzaro)	Free
20 June 2014	Francesco Sabatucci	Lumezzane	Chievo	Chievo	Undisclosed
20 June 2014	Stefano Sabelli	Bari	Roma	Bari	Auction, €600,000
9 June 2014	(Poland) Bartosz Salamon	Sampdoria	Milan	Sampdoria	€1.6 million (swap deal)
20 June 2014	(Senegal) Dembel Sall	Bari	Parma	Renewed	—
18 June 2014	Mattia Sandrini	Parma	Vicenza	Renewed	—
19 June 2014	Nicola Sansone	Sassuolo	Parma	Sassuolo	€5.75 million
19 June 2014	Riccardo Saponara	Milan	Parma	Milan	€1 million
20 June 2014	Lorenzo Saporetti	Milan	Cesena	Cesena	Auction
18 June 2014	(Croatia) Tomislav Šarić	Crotone	Parma	Renewed	—
20 June 2014	Federico Scappi	Chievo	Reggiana	Reggiana	Undisclosed
20 June 2014	Andrea Schiavone	Siena	Juventus	Renewed	—
20 June 2014	Francesco Signori	Modena	Sampdoria	ND (Modena)	Free
20 June 2014	Simone Sini	Perugia	Roma	Roma	Undisclosed
19 June 2014	(Denmark) Frederik Sørensen	Bologna	Juventus	Juventus	€800,000
20 June 2014	Nicolò Sperotto	Carpi	Torino	Renewed	—
19 June 2014	Leonardo Spinazzola	Juventus	Siena	Renewed	—
19 June 2014	(Romania) Adrian Stoian	Chievo	Roma	Renewed	—
20 June 2014	Emiliano Storani	Ascoli	Parma	ND (Ascoli)	Free
13 June 2014	(Greece) Panagiotis Tachtsidis	Catania	Genoa	Genoa	Undisclosed
20 June 2014	(Algeria) Saphir Taïder	Inter	Bologna	Renewed	—
20 June 2014	(Hungary) Zsolt Tamási	Ascoli	Parma	ND (Ascoli)	Free
18 June 2014	Riccardo Tantardini	FeralpiSalò	Atalanta	Renewed	—
20 June 2014	Lorenzo Tassi	Inter	Brescia	Inter	€250,000
20 June 2014	Leonardo Terigi	Crotone	Genoa	ND (Crotone)	Free
20 June 2014	Giovanni Terrani	Monza	Inter	ND (Monza)	Free
19 June 2014	(Senegal) Mame Baba Thiam	Juventus	Lanciano	Renewed	—
19 June 2014	Francesco Todisco	Genoa	Lecce	Renewed	—
18 June 2014	Vincenzo Tommasone	Genoa	Inter	Renewed	—
17 June 2014	Ernesto Torregrossa	Lumezzane	Verona	Verona	Undisclosed
20 June 2014	(Montenegro) Idriz Toskić	Bari	Chievo	Chievo	€400,000
20 June 2014	Andrea Tozzo	Sampdoria	Verona	Sampdoria	Auction, €100,000
20 June 2014	Luca Tremolada	Varese	Inter	Renewed	—
20 June 2014	(Australia) James Troisi	Atalanta	Juventus	Juventus	€1 million
20 June 2014	Alessandro Tuia	Salernitana	Lazio	ND (Salernitana)	Free
20 June 2014	Mattia Valoti	Milan	AlbinoLeffe	AlbinoLeffe	€400,000
18 June 2014	Michael Ventre	Inter	Genoa	Renewed	—
20 June 2014	Enrico Verachi	Como	Cagliari	ND (Como)	Free
17 June 2014	Simone Verdi	Torino	Milan	Renewed	—
20 June 2014	Valerio Verre	Udinese	Roma	Roma	Undisclosed
20 June 2014	Mauro Vigorito	Venezia	Cagliari	ND (Venezia)	Free
20 June 2014	(France) Kevin Vinetot	Genoa	Crotone	Genoa	Undisclosed
20 June 2014	Alessio Vita	Monza	Torino	Monza	Auction
19 June 2014	(Ivory Coast) Guy Yao	Inter	Parma	Inter	€1 million
20 June 2014	Enrico Zampa	Salernitana	Lazio	Lazio	Undisclosed
20 June 2014	Massimo Zamparo	Paganese	Chievo	ND (Paganese)	Free
19 June 2014	Davide Zappacosta	Avellino	Atalanta	Renewed	—
20 June 2014	Giovanni Zaro	Castiglione	Inter	Inter	Auction
20 June 2014	Simone Zaza	Sassuolo	Juventus	Sassuolo	€7.5 million

== Serie B deals ==
Deals involves at least one 2014–15 Serie B clubs

Date	Name	Co-Owner (active)	Passive club (Mother club)	Result	Fee
20 June 2014	Andrea Arrighini	Reggina	Pontedera	Pontedera	Auction
20 June 2014	Filippo Auletta	Varese	Novara	Renewed	—
20 June 2014	(Brazil) Andrè Bassi Borzani	Cuneo	Varese	ND (Cuneo)	Free
20 June 2014	Leonardo Bianchi	Gavorrano	Empoli	Empoli	Undisclosed
20 June 2014	Fabrizio Bramati	Cesena	Crotone	ND (Cesena)	Free
20 June 2014	Oscar Branzani	Barletta	Cittadella	ND (Barletta)	Free
20 June 2014	Alessio Bruno	Pescara	Vicenza	ND (Pescara)	Free
20 June 2014	Eugenio Calvarese	Catanzaro	Pescara	ND (Catanzaro)	Free
19 June 2014	Saverio Camilli	Novara	Siena	Renewed	—
17 June 2014	Manuel Canini	Brescia	Cesena	Renewed	—
20 June 2014	Luigi Canotto	Sorrento	Siena	ND (Sorrento)	Free
20 June 2014	Filippo Capitanio	Cesena	Vicenza	ND (Cesena)	Free
20 June 2014	Andrea Cappa	Vicenza	Pescara	ND (Vicenza)	Free
20 June 2014	Francesco Caratelli	Pescara	Vicenza	ND (Pescara)	Free
20 June 2014	Gianmarco D'Alessandris	Siena	Latina	ND (Siena)	Free
20 June 2014	(Brazil) Caio De Cenco	Pavia	Cesena	Renewed	—
20 June 2014	Alessandro De Leidi	Cittadella	Barletta	ND (Cittadella)	Free
20 June 2014	Andrea De Vito	Avellino	Cittadella	ND (Avellino)	Free
20 June 2014	Simone Della Latta	Viareggio	Empoli	Empoli	Undisclosed
20 June 2014	(Albania) Kastriot Dermaku	Melfi	Lanciano	ND (Melfi)	Free
20 June 2014	Giovanni Di Noia	Pontedera	Bari	Bari	Undisclosed
20 June 2014	Filippo Di Pentima	Vicenza	Pescara	ND (Vicenza)	Free
20 June 2014	Niccolò Dondoni	Novara	Varese	Renewed	—
17 June 2014	O'Neal Ephraim	Cesena	Brescia	Renewed	—
20 June 2014	Filippo Fabbri	San Marino	Cesena	ND (San Marino)	Free
20 June 2014	Roberto Falagario	Ischia	Bari	ND (Ischia)	Free
20 June 2014	Ciro Favetta	Casertana	Juve Stabia	ND (Casertana)	Free
17 June 2014	Daniele Ferri	Brescia	Cesena	Renewed	—
20 June 2014	Mattia Filippi	Vicenza	Cesena	ND (Vicenza)	Free
20 June 2014	Daniele Fioretti	Mantova	Cesena	ND (Mantova)	Free
20 June 2014	Manuel Fischnaller	Reggina	Südtirol	Südtirol	Auction
20 June 2014	Francesco Forte	Gavorrano	Carpi	Carpi	Undisclosed
20 June 2014	Federico Furlan	Bassano	Varese	ND (Bassano)	Free
20 June 2014	Jacopo Furlan	Viareggio	Empoli	ND (Viareggio)	Free
20 June 2014	Marco Fusar Bassini	Gavorrano	Carpi	Carpi	Undisclosed
20 June 2014	Antonio Gammone	Como	Bari	Bari	Undisclosed
20 June 2014	Alessandro Gherardi	Carrarese	Lanciano	ND (Carrarese)	Free
20 June 2014	Niccolò Giannetti	Spezia	Siena	Spezia	Undisclosed
20 June 2014	(Albania) Amadio Gjonaj	Varese	Novara	ND (Varese)	Free
20 June 2014	(Russia) Juri Gonzi	Cuneo	Siena	ND (Cuneo)	Free
20 June 2014	Fabrizio Grillo	Siena	Varese	ND (Siena)	Free
20 June 2014	Paolo Guerci	Carpi	Pavia	Renewed	—
19 June 2014	(Finland) Joonas Jokinen	Siena	Novara	Renewed	—
20 June 2014	Jonis Khoris	Gavorrano	Empoli	ND (Gavorrano)	Free
20 June 2014	(France) Vincent Laurini	Empoli	Carpi	Empoli	Undisclosed
17 June 2014	Nicolò Lini	Cesena	Brescia	Renewed	—
20 June 2014	Lorenzo Longo	Ischia	Bari	Bari	Auction
19 June 2014	Antonio Magli	FeralpiSalò	Brescia	Brescia	Undisclosed
10 June 2014	Mattia Maita	Lumezzane	Reggina	Reggina	Undisclosed
20 June 2014	Emanuele Malerba	Lamezia	Crotone	ND (Lamezia)	Free
20 June 2014	Dario Maltese	Latina	Palermo	ND (Latina)	Free
18 June 2014	Riccardo Martignago	Catanzaro	Cittadella	Renewed	—
20 June 2014	Gregorio Mazzanti	Gavorrano	Empoli	ND (Gavorrano)	Free
20 June 2014	Alessandro Micai	Südtirol	Palermo	ND (Südtirol)	Free
20 June 2014	Andrea Migliavacca	Reggina	Pavia	Renewed	—
19 June 2014	Stefano Moreo	Entella	Varese	Renewed	—
20 June 2014	Maikol Negro	Latina	Nocerina	ND (Latina)	Free
20 June 2014	Leonardo Nunzella	Lanciano	Lecce	Renewed	—
18 June 2014	Matteo Paccagnini	Spezia	Pisa	Renewed	—
20 June 2014	Fabrizio Paghera	Lanciano	Brescia	Lanciano	Auction
20 June 2014	Michel Panatti	Como	Avellino	ND (Como)	Free
20 June 2014	Emanuele Panzeri	Venezia	Novara	ND (Venezia)	Free
20 June 2014	Michele Paolucci	Latina	Siena	ND (Latina)	Free
20 June 2014	Andrea Pastore	Pontedera	Siena	Pontedera	Auction
20 June 2014	Leonardo Pérez	Cittadella	Pisa	ND (Cittadella)	Free
20 June 2014	Mirco Petrella	Teramo	Pescara	ND (Teramo)	Free
20 June 2014	Fabio Reato	Cesena	Pavia	Renewed	—
19 June 2014	Matteo Ricci	Pontedera	Empoli	Empoli	Undisclosed
20 June 2014	Giuseppe Rizzo	Pescara	Reggina	Reggina	Undisclosed
20 June 2014	Danilo Russo	Pro Vercelli	Spezia	ND (Pro Vercelli)	Free
20 June 2014	Claudio Santini	Gavorrano	Empoli	Empoli	Undisclosed
19 June 2014	Pierantonio Sassano	Teramo	Trapani	Trapani	Undisclosed
18 June 2014	Federico Serraiocco	Brescia	Teramo	Renewed	—
20 June 2014	(San Marino) Mattia Stefanelli	Crotone	Cesena	ND (Crotone)	Free
20 June 2014	Lorenzo Tempesti	Gavorrano	Empoli	Empoli	Undisclosed
18 June 2014	Dario Toninelli	Bassano	Varese	ND (Bassano)	Free
20 June 2014	Alex Valentini	Spezia	Pro Vercelli	ND (Spezia)	Free
20 June 2014	Alessandro Vinci	Gavorrano	Carpi	Carpi	Undisclosed
20 June 2014	Nicolas Viola	Palermo	Ternana	Renewed	—
19 June 2014	Marco Vittiglio	Entella	Pescara	Renewed	—
20 June 2014	Luca Zamparo	FeralpiSalò	Varese	FeralpiSalò	Undisclosed
20 June 2014	Matteo Zanini	Cesena	Pavia	Renewed	—
