= List of Italian football transfers summer 2012 (July) =

This is a list of Italian football transfers featuring at least one Serie A or Serie B club which were completed after the end of the 2011–12 season and before the end of the 2012 summer transfer window. The window formally opened on 2 July and closed on 31 August 2012 (two months), but Lega Serie A and Lega Serie B accepted to document any transfer before that day; however, those players would only be able to play their new clubs at the start of the 2012–13 season. Free agents could join any club at any time, however.

== May 2012 – July 2012 ==
Date	Name	Moving from	Moving to	Fee
20 January 2012^{1}	Martí Riverola	(Spain) Barcelona	Bologna	Free
10 February 2012^{1}	Dániel Tőzsér	(Belgium) Genk	Genoa	Free
10 February 2012^{1}	Sulley Muntari (Ghana)	Internazionale	Milan	Free
22 February 2012^{1}	Steve von Bergen	Cesena	Genoa	Free
22 March 2012^{1}	Pavol Bajza	(Slovakia) Dubnica	Parma	Undisclosed
22 March 2012^{1}	Sotiris Ninis	(Greece) Panathinaikos	Parma	Free
22 March 2012^{1}	Ederson	(France) Lyon	Lazio	Free
6 April 2012^{1}	Massimo Bonanni	Lugano (Switzerland)	Genoa	€1.45M
16 April 2012	Sokratis Papastathopoulos	Genoa	(Germany) Bremen	€5M
9 May 2012^{1}	Bakaye Traoré	(France) Nancy	Milan	Free
14 May 2012^{1}	Mark van Bommel	Milan	(Netherlands) PSV	Free
17 May 2012	Fredy Guarín (Colombia)	(Portugal) Porto	Internazionale	€11M
17 May 2012^{1}	Riccardo Montolivo	Fiorentina	Milan	Free
21 May 2012^{1}	Andrea Raggi	Bologna	(France) AS Monaco	Free
25 May 2012^{1}	Martín Cáceres (Uruguay)	(Spain) Sevilla	Juventus	€8M
24 May 2012^{1}	Gabriel	(Brazil) Cruzeiro	Milan	€1M
25 May 2012^{2}	Marco Di Vaio	Bologna	(Canada) MLS (Montreal Impact)	Undisclosed
25 May 2012^{1}	Thomas Heurtaux	(France) Caen	Udinese	Undisclosed
28 May 2012	Daniele Forte	Bellaria	Cesena	Free
31 May 2012^{1}	Paul Papp	(Romania) Vaslui	Chievo	Undisclosed
5 June 2012^{1}	Ahmed Hegazy (Egypt)	(Egypt) Ismaily	Fiorentina	Undisclosed
6 June 2012	Goran Pandev (North Macedonia)	Internazionale	Napoli	Undisclosed
6 June 2012	Franco Brienza	Siena	Palermo	Undisclosed
7 June 2012	Rodrigo Palacio	Genoa	Internazionale	Undisclosed
7 June 2012^{1}	Willians (Brazil)	(Brazil) Flamengo	Udinese	Undisclosed
14 June 2012	Gianluca Lapadula	Parma	Cesena	Co-ownership, €1.4M (player swap)
14 June 2012^{1}	Alen Krčić	(Slovenia) Triglav Kranj	Crotone	Undisclosed
15 June 2012^{1}	Amidu Salifu (Ghana)	Fiorentina	Catania	Loan
15 June 2012	Jan Koprivec (Slovenia)	Udinese	Perugia	Co-ownership, Undisclosed
15 June 2012^{1}	Gennaro Gattuso	Milan	Sion (Switzerland)	Free
19 June 2012	Leonardo Spinazzola	Siena (youth)	Juventus	Co-ownership, €400,000
19 June 2012	Alberto Libertazzi	Juventus	Novara	Co-ownership, €450,000 (part of Beltrame)
20 June 2012	Francesco Acerbi	Genoa	Milan	Co-ownership, €4M
20 June 2012^{1}	Kévin Constant	Genoa	Milan	Loan
20 June 2012	Andrea Rossi	Siena	Parma	Co-ownership, €1.8M
20 June 2012	Manuel Coppola	Parma	Siena	Co-ownership, €1.6M
20 June 2012	Mattia Destro	Genoa	Siena	Co-ownership, €1.3M
20 June 2012^{1}	Raffaele Schiavi	Parma	Spezia	Loan
20 June 2012^{1}	Matteo Mandorlini	Brescia (& Parma, c)	Spezia	Loan
20 June 2012	Jasmin Kurtić	Varese	Palermo	Co-ownership counter-option, €200,000
20 June 2012	Magnus Troest	Genoa	Varese	Co-ownership, Undisclosed
21 June 2012^{1}	Giuseppe Prestia	Palermo (youth)	Ascoli	Loan
21 June 2012	Adrian Stoian	Roma	Bari	Co-ownership, €300,000
21 June 2012	Luca Rossettini	Siena	Cagliari	Undisclosed
21 June 2012	Essengue (Cameroon)	Genoa	Cesena	€150,000
21 June 2012	Diego Farias (Brazil)	Nocerina	Chievo	Co-ownership counter-option, Undisclosed
21 June 2012	Daniel Ferreira (Brazil)	Varese	Foggia	Co-ownership, Undisclosed
21 June 2012	Gianluca Caprari	Roma	Pescara	Co-ownership, €1.2M
21 June 2012^{1}	Marco Sansovini	Pescara	Spezia	€150,000
22 June 2012	Alessandro Florenzi	Roma	Crotone	Co-ownership, €250,000
22 June 2012	Stefano Pettinari	Roma	Crotone	Co-ownership, €250,000
22 June 2012	Riccardo Improta	Lanciano	Genoa	Undisclosed
22 June 2012	Pablo Andrés González	Palermo	Novara	€3M (swap with Morganella & Ujkani)
22 June 2012	Tomáš Košický	Catania	Novara	Undisclosed (swap with Morimoto)
22 June 2012^{1}	Andrea Barberis	Varese	Pisa	Loan
22 June 2012^{1}	Angelo Bencivenga	Parma	Pro Vercelli	Loan
22 June 2012	Federico Frigerio	Novara	Renate	Co-ownership, Undisclosed
22 June 2012	Luca Antei	Grosseto	Roma	Co-ownership counter-option, €100,000
22 June 2012	Marco D'Alessandro	Verona	Roma	Co-ownership counter-option, €100,000
22 June 2012	Tallo (Ivory Coast)	Chievo	Roma	Co-ownership, €1M
22 June 2012	Gennaro Troianiello	Siena	Sassuolo	Undisclosed
22 June 2012	Zdeněk Zlámal	Udinese	(Czech Republic) Sigma Olomouc	Undisclosed
22 June 2012	Nicola Madonna	Atalanta	Spezia	Co-ownership, €250,000
21 June 2012	Agostino Garofalo	Siena	Spezia	Loan
22 June 2012	Riccardo Fiamozzi	Varese (youth)	Torino	Co-ownership, Undisclosed (swap with Ebagua)
22 June 2012	Riccardo Fiamozzi	Torino	Varese	Loan
25 June 2012	Jonas Portin	Padova	Parma	Co-ownership, €2M (swap with Galli)
25 June 2012	Niccolò Galli	Parma	Padova	Co-ownership, €2M (swap with Portin)
25 June 2012	Jonas Portin	Parma	Padova	Loan (between co-owner)
26 June 2012	Alessandro Iacobucci	Siena	Parma	Co-ownership, €1.7M (swap with Galuppo)
26 June 2012	Alberto Galuppo	Parma	Siena	Co-ownership, €1.7M (swap with Iacobucci)
26 June 2012	Giuseppe Pacini	Siena	Parma	Co-ownership, €500,000 (swap with Doumbia)
26 June 2012	Abdou Doumbia	Parma	Siena	Co-ownership, €500,000 (swap with Pacini)
26 June 2012	Diego Cenciarelli	Fiorentina (youth)	Perugia	?
26 June 2012	Thierry Doubai (Ivory Coast)	Udinese	(France) Sochaux	Undisclosed
27 June 2012	Ettore Marchi	Sassuolo	Benevento	€150,000
27 June 2012^{1}	Dorlan Pabón (Colombia)	(Colombia) Atlético Nacional	Parma	Undisclosed
27 June 2012	Andrea Bovo	Padova	Spezia	Undisclosed
28 June 2012	Yonese Hanine	Chievo	Ascoli	Co-ownership, Undisclosed
28 June 2012	Lorenzo Marchionni	Ascoli (youth)	Chievo (youth)	Co-ownership, Undisclosed
28 June 2012	Francesco Finocchio	Parma	Bologna	Co-ownership, €1M (swap with Casini)
28 June 2012	Riccardo Casini	Bologna (youth)	Parma	Co-ownership, €1M (swap with Finocchio)
28 June 2012	Gregoire Defrel	Parma	Cesena	Co-ownership, €1.2M (player swap)
28 June 2012	Andrea Rossini	Cesena	Parma	Co-ownership, €1.6M (player swap)
28 June 2012	Nicola Del Pivo	Cesena	Parma	Co-ownership, €1M (player swap)
28 June 2012^{1}	Mário Rui	Gubbio	Parma	€595,000
28 June 2012^{1}	Mário Rui	Parma	Spezia	Loan, Free
28 June 2012^{1}	Rolf Feltscher	Parma	Padova	Loan
28 June 2012^{1}	Alessandro Iacobucci	Parma (co-owned with Siena)	Spezia	Loan
29 June 2012	Houssine Kharja	Fiorentina	(Qatar) Al-Arabi	Free
29 June 2012	Davide Colomba	Parma	Ascoli	Co-ownership, €1.1M
29 June 2012	Lorenzo Pasqualini	Ascoli	Parma	Co-ownership, €1.25M
29 June 2012^{1}	Lorenzo Pasqualini	Parma	Ascoli	Loan (between co-owner)
29 June 2012	Ryder (Brazil)	Fiorentina (youth)	(Brazil) Bahia	Loan
29 June 2012	Daniele Ferri	Cesena	Brescia	Co-ownership, €1.2M (swap with O'Neal)
29 June 2012	Ephraim O'Neal (Ghana)	Brescia (youth)	Cesena	Co-ownership, €1.2M (swap with Ferri)
29 June 2012	Stefano Russo	Parma	Brescia	Co-ownership, €1.2M (swap with Belotti)
29 June 2012	Nicolo Belotti	Brescia	Parma	Co-ownership, €1.2M (swap with Russo)
29 June 2012	Fabrizio Bramati	Crotone (youth)	Cesena	Co-ownership, €300,000 (swap with Stefanelli)
29 June 2012	Mattia Stefanelli	Cesena (youth)	Crotone	Co-ownership, €300,000 (swap with Bramati)
29 June 2012	Alessandro Micai	Palermo (youth)	Como	Loan
29 June 2012	Matteo Mantovani	Parma (youth)	Crotone	Co-ownership, €900,000 (part of Cioffi)
29 June 2012	Mauro Cioffi	Crotone (youth)	Parma	Co-ownership, €1.3M (€400,000 + 50% Mantovani)
29 June 2012	Francesco Vassallo	Palermo (youth)	Foligno	Co-ownership, €500
29 June 2012	Andrea Adamo	Palermo	Foligno	Co-ownership, €500
29 June 2012	Nicolás Bremec	Taranto	Grosseto	Undisclosed
29 June 2012	Francesco Caratelli	Vicenza (youth)	Pescara	Co-ownership, €450,000 (swap with Di Pentima)
29 June 2012	Filippo Di Pentima	Pescara (youth)	Vicenza (remains in Pescara, t)	Co-ownership, €450,000 (swap with Caratelli)
29 June 2012	Alessio Bruno	Vicenza	Pescara (remains in Vicenza, t)	Co-ownership, €400,000 (swap with Cappa)
29 June 2012	Andrea Cappa	Pescara	Vicenza	Co-ownership, €400,000 (swap with Bruno_
29 June 2012^{1}	Paolo Rozzio	Fiorentina (youth)	Pisa	Loan
29 June 2012^{1}	Pietro Iemmello	Fiorentina	Pro Vercelli	Loan
29 June 2012^{1}	Marcos Miranda (Brazil)	Fiorentina	Pro Vercelli	Co-ownership, Undisclosed
29 June 2012^{1}	Danilo Pereira	Parma	(Netherlands) Roda	Loan
29 June 2012	Giulio Cavallari	Vicenza (youth)	Siena	Co-ownership, €768,000
29 June 2012	Richard Gabriel Marcone	Siena (youth)	Vicenza	Co-ownership, €750,000
30 June 2012^{1}	Clarence Seedorf	Milan	(Brazil) Botafogo	Free
30 June 2012	Steve Pinau	Genoa	Clermont Foot (France)	Free
30 June 2012	Elvis Abbruscato	Vicenza	Pescara	€2.3M (swap with Giacomelli)
30 June 2012	Stefano Giacomelli	Pescara	Vicenza	€2.3M (swap with Abbruscato)
30 June 2012^{1}	Ishak Belfodil	(France) Lyon	Parma	€2.5M + 20% adding value
1 July 2012	Matteo Contini	(Spain) Zaragoza	Siena	€1.3M
2 July 2012	Mauricio Isla (Chile)	Udinese	Juventus	Co-ownership, €9.4M
2 July 2012	Kwadwo Asamoah (Ghana)	Udinese	Juventus	Co-ownership, €9M
2 July 2012	Cristian Pasquato	Juventus	Udinese	Co-ownership, €1.5M
2 July 2012	Cristian Pasquato	Udinese (& Juventus)	Bologna	Loan
2 July 2012	Mattia Cassani	Palermo	Fiorentina	€2.75M
2 July 2012	Ezequiel Lavezzi\	Napoli	(France) Paris Saint-Germain	Undisclosed
2 July 2012	Vito Di Bari	Taranto	Reggina	Free
2 July 2012	Manuel Angelilli	Marino	Reggina	Undisclosed
3 July 2012	Nicola Leali	Brescia	Juventus	€3.8M
3 July 2012	Andrea Rispoli	Parma	Padova	Loan
3 July 2012	Zé Eduardo (Brazil)	Parma	Padova	Loan
3 July 2012	Nwankwo (Nigeria)	Parma (co-owned with Internazionale	Padova	Loan
3 July 2012	Simone Benedetti	Inter (& Torino, c)	Spezia	Loan
4 July 2012	Pavol Farkaš	(Romania) Vaslui	Chievo	Undisclosed
4 July 2012	Miguel Veloso	Genoa	(Ukraine) Dynamo Kyiv	Undisclosed
4 July 2012	Lúcio (Brazil)	Internazionale	Juventus	Free
4 July 2012	Alessandro Vinci	Empoli	Juve Stabia	Undisclosed
4 July 2012	Andrea Seculin	Fiorentina	Juve Stabia	Loan
4 July 2012	Daniel Kofi Agyei (Ghana)	Fiorentina (youth)	Juve Stabia	Loan
4 July 2012	Cristiano Piccini	Fiorentina	Spezia	Loan
4 July 2012	Giuseppe Rizza	Livorno	Nocerina	Undisclosed
4 July 2012	Daniele Buzzegoli	Spezia	Novara	€800,000 (swap with Porcari)
4 July 2012	Filippo Porcari	Novara	Spezia	€800,000 (swap with Buzzegoli)
4 July 2012	Marco Piccioni	Sassuolo	Padova	Free
4 July 2012	Adrian Stoian	Bari	Roma	Co-ownership resolution, €1M
5 July 2012	Riccardo Piscitelli	Milan (youth)	Carrarese	?
5 July 2012	Stefano D'Agostino	Sampdoria	Catanzaro	Co-ownership, Undisclosed
5 July 2012	Gianluigi Bamonte	Bellaria	Cesena	Free
5 July 2012	Alberto Masi	Pro Vercelli	Juventus	Co-ownership, ca. €1M
5 July 2012	Massimo Zamparo	Chievo (youth)	Lumezzane	Loan
5 July 2012	Alessandro Nesta	Milan	(Canada) MLS (Montreal Impact)	Free (Undisclosed from Impact to NY Red Bulls)
5 July 2012	Luigi Sepe	Napoli	Pisa	?
5 July 2012	Amedeo Benedetti	Chievo	Pisa	?
5 July 2012	Filippo Fondi	Chievo	Pisa	Co-ownership, Undisclosed
5 July 2012	Gonçalo Brandão	Siena	Parma	Co-ownership, €1.6M
5 July 2012	Paolo Hernán Dellafiore	Parma	Siena	Co-ownership, €1.8M
5 July 2012	Jean-François Gillet	Bologna	Torino	Undisclosed
5 July 2012	Matteo Darmian	Palermo	Torino	Co-ownership, €825,000
6 July 2012	Antonio Caracciolo	Genoa	Brescia	Co-ownership, €500
6 July 2012	Alberto Frison	Vicenza	Catania	Co-ownership, €650,000
6 July 2012	Raffaele Imparato	Catania	Vicenza	Free
6 July 2012	Roberto Guana	Cesena	Chievo	Undisclosed
6 July 2012	Manuel Iori	Chievo	Cesena	Loan
6 July 2012	Davide Succi	Palermo	Cesena	Undisclosed
6 July 2012	Diego Forlán	Internazionale	(Brazil) Internacional	Free
6 July 2012	Jacopo Coletta	Chievo (youth)	Lumezzane	Co-ownership, Undisclosed
6 July 2012	Federico Viviani	Roma (youth)	Padova	Loan
6 July 2012	Alessandro Florenzi	Crotone	Roma	Co-ownership resolution, €1.25M
6 July 2012	Lorenzo Crisetig	Parma (& Inter, c)	Speiza	Loan
6 July 2012	Simone Calvano	Milan (youth)	Verona	Loan
7 July 2012	Gonçalo Brandão	Parma (& Siena, c)	Cesena	Loan
7 July 2012	Marco Parolo	Cesena	Parma	Loan
7 July 2012	Alessandro De Vitis	Parma	Padova	Loan
7 July 2012	Andrea Lussardi	Piacenza	Reggina	Free
7 July 2012	Marco Migliorini	Chieti	Torino	€280,000
8 July 2012	Robert Acquafresca	Genoa	Bologna	Co-ownership, €2.5M
9 July 2012	Marco D'Alessandro	Roma	Cesena	Loan
9 July 2012	Emanuele Belardi	Reggina	Cesena	Free
9 July 2012	Andrea Gessa	Pescara	Cesena	Undisclosed
9 July 2012	Giuseppe Colucci	Cesena	Pescara	Undisclosed
9 July 2012	Alberto Paloschi	Milan	Chievo	Loan
9 July 2012	Isaac Cofie (Ghana)	Genoa	Chievo	Co-ownership, €1.5M
9 July 2012	Daniele Croce	Sorrento	Empoli	Free
9 July 2012	Giorgio Schiavini	Sassuolo	FeralpiSalò	Co-ownership, Undisclosed
9 July 2012	Anselmo (Brazil)	(Brazil) Palmeiras	Genoa	Undisclosed
9 July 2012	Marco Silvestri	Chievo	Padova	Loan
9 July 2012	Jonathan Biabiany	Sampdoria	Parma	Co-ownership, €2.5M
9 July 2012	Giuseppe Scurto	Triestina	Juve Stabia	Free
10 July 2012	Luca Bittante	Fiorentina (youth)	Avellino	Loan
10 July 2012	Saná	Valladolid (Spain)	Bari	Free
10 July 2012	Mauro Gori	Paganese	Bari	Co-ownership, Undisclosed
10 July 2012	Eljero Elia	Juventus	(Germany) Bremen	€5.5M + bonus
10 July 2012	Lucas Finazzi	Chievo	Brescia	Loan
10 July 2012	Ahmad Benali	(England) Manchester City	Brescia	Undisclosed
10 July 2012	Antonio Giulio Picci	Martina	Brescia	Free
10 July 2012	Simone Pecorini	Internazionale (youth)	Empoli	Loan
10 July 2012	Giulio Grifoni	Fiorentina	Gavorrano	Co-ownership, Undisclosed
10 July 2012	Gianmarco Zigoni	Milan	Pro Vercelli	Loan
10 July 2012	Maxi López	Catania	Sampdoria	Undisclosed
10 July 2012	Luigi Monopoli	Bari	Vigor Lamezia	Loan
10 July 2012	Dario Cascione	Bari (youth)	Vigor Lamezia	Loan
10 July 2012	Luigi Rana	Bari	Vigor Lamezia	Loan
11 July 2012	Nicola Del Pivo	Parma (co-owned with Cesena)	Como	Loan
11 July 2012	Alex Benvenga	Varese	Como	Loan
11 July 2012	Paolo Marchi	Varese	Como	Loan
11 July 2012	Alessandro Scialpi	Varese	Como	Co-ownership, Undisclosed
11 July 2012	Mounir El Hamdaoui	(Netherlands) Ajax	Fiorentina	Undisclosed
11 July 2012	Facundo Roncaglia	(Argentina) Boca Juniors	Fiorentina	Undisclosed
11 July 2012	Radoslav Kirilov	Chievo (youth)	Lumezzane	Loan
11 July 2012	Manuel Canini	Cesena (youth)	Santarcangelo	Loan
11 July 2012	Richard Gabriel Marcone	Vicenza (& Siena)	South Tyrol	Loan
11 July 2012	Guido Di Deo	Taranto	Ternana	Free
11 July 2012	Luis Maria Alfageme	Grosseto	Ternana	Free
11 July 2012	Nnamdi Oduamadi (Nigeria)	Milan	Varese	Loan
12 July 2012	Giuseppe Nazzani	Bologna	Giacomense	Loan
12 July 2012	Andrea Ingegneri	Bologna	Foligno	Loan
12 July 2012	(Spain) José Crespo	Bologna	Verona	Loan
12 July 2012	Filippo Tanaglia	Chievo	Alessandria	?
12 July 2012	Marco Pavanello	Chievo	Alessandria	Co-ownership, Undisclosed
12 July 2012	Nicolò Bianchi	Novara	Alessandria	Loan
12 July 2012	Marco Ezio Fossati	Milan	Ascoli	Loan
12 July 2012	Stefano Castellani	Empoli	Barletta	Loan
12 July 2012	Michel Panatti	Fiorentina (youth)	Avellino	Co-ownership, Undisclosed
12 July 2012	Alberto Baccarin	Fiorentina (youth)	Borgo-a-Buggiano	Co-ownership, Undisclosed
12 July 2012	Michele Canini	Cagliari	Genoa	€2.9M
12 July 2012	Fabrizio Paghera	Brescia	Lanciano	Loan
12 July 2012	Francesco Rossi	Atalanta	Cuneo	Loan
12 July 2012	Giuseppe Gemiti	Novara	Livorno	Undisclosed
12 July 2012	Romano Perticone	Livorno	Novara	Undisclosed
12 July 2012	Giacomo Tulli	Vicenza	Pisa	Loan
12 July 2012	Nicola Dal Bosco	Vicenza	Poggibonsi	Loan
12 July 2012	Gaetano Caridi	Grosseto	Pro Vercelli	Undisclosed
12 July 2012	Matteo Grandi	Cesena	South Tyrol	?
13 July 2012	Francesco Fedato	Lucchese	Bari (& Catania, c)	Free
13 July 2012	David Di Michele	Lecce	Chievo	Undisclosed
13 July 2012	Gianluca Carfora	Juventus	Cuneo	Co-ownership
13 July 2012	Giuseppe Torromino	Treviso	Crotone	Undisclosed
13 July 2012	Vincent Laurini	Carpi	Empoli	Co-ownership, Undisclosed
13 July 2012	Marcello Falzerano	Chievo	Grosseto	Co-ownership, Undisclosed
13 July 2012	Fabio Borini	Roma	(England) Liverpool	€13.3M + bonus
13 July 2012	Paolo Frascatore	Roma	Sassuolo	Loan
13 July 2012	Nicola Pasini	Genoa	Spezia	Loan
13 July 2012	Daniel Cappelletti	Palermo	South Tyrol	Loan
13 July 2012	Gianluca Sansone	Sassuolo	Torino	Co-ownership, Undisclosed
13 July 2012	Daniele Fioretti	Cesena	Tritium	Loan
14 July 2012	Stefano Sabelli	Roma (youth)	Bari	Loan
14 July 2012	Rodrigo Alborno	Internazionale (youth)	Novara	Loan
14 July 2012	Francesco Bardi	Internazionale	Novara	Loan
14 July 2012	Thiago Silva (Brazil)	Milan	(France) Paris Saint-Germain	€41M
14 July 2012	Manuel Gavilan (Spain)	Bologna	Nocerina	Loan
14 July 2012	Marco Sportiello	Atalanta	Carpi	Loan
14 July 2012	Francesco Valiani	Parma	Siena	Undisclosed
14 July 2012	Davide Di Gennaro	Milan	Spezia	€500,000
14 July 2012	Gabriele Zerbo	Palermo (youth)	Teramo (youth)	Co-ownership, Undisclosed
15 July 2012	Cristiano Lupatelli	Genoa	Fiorentina	Free
15 July 2012	Michael Bradley (United States)	Chievo	Roma	€3.75M (€3.25M + 50% Stoian)
15 July 2012	Adrian Stoian	Roma	Chievo	Co-ownership, €500,000 (part of Bradley)
15 July 2012	Thomas Pichlmann	Verona	Spezia	Loan
16 July 2012	Mattia Filippi	Cesena (youth)	Forlì	Loan
16 July 2012	Mattia Stefanelli	Crotone (co-owned with Cesena)	Forlì	Loan
16 July 2012	Federico Barba	Roma (youth)	Grosseto	Loan
16 July 2012	Richmond Boakye (Ghana)	Genoa	Juventus	Co-ownership, €4M (swap with Immobile)
16 July 2012	Loris Bacchetti	Pescara	Lanciano	Loan
16 July 2012	Afriyie Acquah (Ghana)	Palermo	Parma	Loan
16 July 2012	Simone Branca	Novara (youth)	South Tyrol	Co-ownership, Undisclosed
16 July 2012	Gianluca Rubin	Juventus (youth)	South Tyrol	Loan
16 July 2012	Simone Iacoponi	Empoli	South Tyrol	Undisclosed
16 July 2012	Lorenzo De Silvestri	Fiorentina	Sampdoria	Loan
16 July 2012	Maurizio Lauro	Cesena	Ternana	Undisclosed
17 July 2012	Roger Carvalho (Brazil) (European Union)	(Brazil) Tombense	Bologna	Loan
17 July 2012	Matteo Solini	Chievo	Castiglione	Loan
17 July 2012	Matteo Pisseri	Parma	Catanzaro	Loan
17 July 2012	Alessandro Orchi	Roma (youth)	Catanzaro	Co-ownership, Undisclosed
17 July 2012	Stefano D'Agostino	Sampdoria	Catanzaro	Co-ownership, Undisclosed
17 July 2012	Riccardo Regno	Livorno	Gubbio	?
17 July 2012	Andrey Galabinov	Livorno	Gubbio	?
17 July 2012	Alessio Grea	Genoa	Gubbio	?
17 July 2012	Pietro Baccolo	Parma	Gubbio	Loan, (€200,000) (Note: As premi di valorizzazione)
17 July 2012	Luca Ghiringhelli	Milan	Novara	Co-ownership, Undisclosed
17 July 2012	Matteo Politano	Roma (youth)	Perugia	Loan
18 July 2012	Davide Zappacosta	Atalanta	Avellino	Co-ownership, Undisclosed
18 July 2012	Niccolò Corticchia	Juventus (youth)	Carrarese	Loan
18 July 2012	Francesco Margiotta	Juventus (youth)	Carrarese	Loan
18 July 2012	Andrea De Paola	Carpi (co-owned with Juventus)	Carrarese	Loan
18 July 2012	Alessandro Favalli	Cremonese	Cesena	Loan
18 July 2012	Milan Đurić	Parma (co-owned with Cesena)	Cremonese	Loan
18 July 2012	Antonio Gammone	Bari	Como	Loan
18 July 2012	Luca Tremolada	Internazionale	Como	Co-ownership, Undisclosed
18 July 2012	Andrea Bertolacci	Roma	Genoa	Co-ownership, €1M (part of Tachtsidis)
18 July 2012	Panagiotis Tachtsidis	Genoa	Roma	Co-ownership, €2.5M (€1.5M + 50% Bertolacci)
18 July 2012	Luca Locci	Lecce (youth)	Bari	Free
18 July 2012	Antonio Candreva	Udinese	Lazio	Loan
18 July 2012	Giovanni Di Lorenzo	Reggina	Cuneo	Loan
18 July 2012	Alessandro Ruggeri	Reggina	Cuneo	Co-ownership
18 July 2012	Luca Locci	Bari	Melfi	Loan
18 July 2012	Federico Piovaccari	Sampdoria	Novara	Loan
19 July 2012	Vincenzo Camilleri	Reggina	Cagliari	Loan
19 July 2012	Andrea Rossi	Parma (with Siena, c)	Cesena	Loan
19 July 2012	Tom (Brazil)	Catania	(Slovenia) Koper	Undisclosed
19 July 2012	Giacomo Bindi	Genoa	Latina	Free
19 July 2012	Francesco Virdis	Progetto Sant'Elia	Chievo	Free
19 July 2012	Francesco Virdis	Chievo	Savona	Co-ownership, Undisclosed
19 July 2012	Matteo Chinellato	Milan	Tritium	Loan
19 July 2012	Filippo Scaglia	Torino	Cuneo	Loan
19 July 2012	Gianluca Leonardi	Roma	Cuneo	Loan
19 July 2012	Andrea Arrigoni	Ternana	Tritium	?
19 July 2012	Raphael Martinho	Catania	Verona	Loan
20 July 2012	Cristian Cesaretti	Empoli	Frosinone	Undisclosed
20 July 2012	Gaby Mudingayi	Bologna	Internazionale	Loan
20 July 2012	Gaël Genevier	Siena	Juve Stabia	Loan
20 July 2012	Matteo Ardemagni	Atalanta	Modena	Loan
20 July 2012	Simone Colombi	Atalanta	Modena	Loan
20 July 2012	Alberto Massacci	(England) Manchester United	Modena	Free (undisclosed training compensation)
20 July 2012	Angelo Di Stasio	Irsinese (amateur)	Modena	Undisclosed
20 July 2012	Antonio Esposito	Inter	Treviso	Co-ownership, Undisclosed
20 July 2012	Lorenzo Del Prete	Siena	Novara	€600,000
20 July 2012	Massimo Paci	Novara	Siena	€600,000
20 July 2012	Fabio Lucioni	Siena	Reggina	Co-ownership, €250
20 July 2012	Emanuele Pesoli	Siena	Verona	Free
23 July 2012	Juan Guillermo Cuadrado (Colombia)	Udinese	Fiorentina	Loan
23 July 2012	Francesco Pambianchi	Parma	Gubbio	Loan
23 July 2012	Alessio Manzoni	Parma	Gubbio	Loan, (€205,000)
24 July 2012	Rodrigo Ely	Milan (youth)	Reggina	Loan
25 July 2012	Nicola Ferrari	Sassuolo	Aprilia	Co-ownership, Undisclosed
25 July 2012	Cesare Natali	Fiorentina	Bologna	Free
25 July 2012	Tiberio Guarente	(Spain) Sevilla	Bologna	Loan
25 July 2012	Andrea Impagliazzo	Messina (amateur)	Varese	Undisclosed
25 July 2012	Andrea Impagliazzo	Varese	HinterReggio	Co-ownership, Undisclosed
25 July 2012	Alberto Almici	Atalanta	Lanciano	Loan
25 July 2012	Nadir Minotti	Atalanta (youth)	Lanciano	Loan
25 July 2012	Francesco Signori	Sampdoria	Modena	Loan
25 July 2012	Niccolò Manfredini	Fiorentina	Modena	Co-ownership, €300
25 July 2012	Salvatore Papa	Chievo	Santarcangelo	Undisclosed
25 July 2012	Valerio Anastasi	Chievo	Santarcangelo	Loan
25 July 2012	Matteo Oliboni	Chievo (youth)	Santarcangelo	Loan
26 July 2012	Alessandro Elia	Parma	Arzanese	Loan
26 July 2012	Kingsley Umunegbu (Nigeria)	Chiasso (Switzerland) (at Milan, t)	Bologna	Free (€175,000 other cost)
26 July 2012	Bright Addae (Ghana)	Parma	Crotone	Loan
26 July 2012	Mohamed Traoré (Guinea)	Parma	Crotone	Co-ownership, €500
26 July 2012	Emiliano Viviano	Internazionale	Palermo	Co-ownership resolution, €3M (swap with Silvestre)
26 July 2012	Emiliano Viviano	Palermo	Fiorentina	Loan, €500,000
26 July 2012	Francesco Della Rocca	Palermo	Fiorentina	Loan
27 July 2012	Matías Fernández (Chile)	(Portugal) Sporting	Fiorentina	€3.136M + €1.5M bonus
26 July 2012	Juan Cruz Armada (Spain)	Bologna	Carrarese	Loan
26 July 2012	Riccardo Pasi	Bologna	South Tyrol	Loan
26 July 2012	Francesco Cernuto	Reggina	Treviso	Loan
26 July 2012	Ousmane Sy (France)	Reggina	Treviso	Loan
26 July 2012	Andrea Picone	Reggina	Treviso	Loan
27 July 2012	Paul Pogba	(England) Manchester United	Juventus	Free (€1.635M other cost)
27 July 2012	Francesco Bontà	Reggina	South Tyrol	Loan
28 July 2012	Mattia Evangelisti	Vicenza	Fano	Loan
28 July 2012	Simone Sbardella	Udinese (youth)	Fano	Undisclosed
30 July 2012	Yuri Papi	Spezia (youth)	Borgo-a-Buggiano	Loan
30 July 2012	Federico Lazzoni	Spezia (youth)	Borgo-a-Buggiano	Loan
30 July 2012	Daniele Pedrelli	Spezia	Carrarese	Loan
30 July 2012	Manuel Marras	Spezia (youth)	Rimini	Loan
30 July 2012	Mattia Destro	Siena	Genoa	Co-ownership resolution, €7.5M
30 July 2012	Mattia Destro	Genoa	Roma	Loan, €11.5M
30 July 2012	Giammario Piscitella	Roma (youth)	Genoa	Co-ownership, €1.5M (part of Destro)
30 July 2012	Valerio Verre	Roma (youth)	Genoa	Co-ownership, €1.5M (part of Destro)
30 July 2012	Valerio Verre	Genoa	Siena	Loan
30 July 2012	Eugenio Lamanna	Genoa	Siena	Co-ownership, €1.5M (part of Destro)
30 July 2012	Angelo Rea	Sassuolo	Varese	Undisclosed
30 July 2012	Andrea Cocco	AlbinoLeffe	Verona	Co-ownership, Undisclosed
31 July 2012	Pelé	Milan	(Ukraine) Arsenal Kyiv	Loan
31 July 2012	Mattia Graffiedi	Gubbio	Cesena	Free
31 July 2012	Alessandro Marotta	Bari	Cremonese	Loan
31 July 2012	Sacha Cori	Cesena	Empoli	Loan
31 July 2012	Nicola Ciotola	Verona	L'Aquila	Free
31 July 2012	Vincenzo Pepe	Siracusa	Lanciano	Free
31 July 2012	Michelangelo Albertazzi	Milan	Verona	Loan

- Note:

^{1} The deals would be effective on 1 July 2012
^{2} The deals would be effective on 27 June 2012
