= Matteo Di Gennaro =

Italian professional footballer

Personal information
- Date of birth: 2 June 1994 (age 32)
- Place of birth: Sant'Elpidio a Mare, Italy
- Height: 1.92 m (6 ft 4 in)
- Position: Defender

Team information
- Current team: Catania
- Number: 15

Youth career
- –2011: Ascoli
- 2011–2013: Parma

Senior career*
| Years | Team | Apps | (Gls) |
| 2013–2015 | Parma | 0 | (0) |
| 2013–2014 | → Ascoli (loan) | 13 | (0) |
| 2014–2015 | → Renate (loan) | 16 | (0) |
| 2015–2018 | Renate | 88 | (5) |
| 2018–2021 | Livorno | 63 | (4) |
| 2021–2022 | Alessandria | 44 | (4) |
| 2022–2023 | Triestina | 19 | (2) |
| 2023 | → Feralpisalò (loan) | 13 | (1) |
| 2023 | Feralpisalò | 0 | (0) |
| 2023–2024 | Carrarese | 30 | (3) |
| 2024– | Catania | 45 | (3) |
- * Club domestic league appearances and goals as of 1 May 2026

Matteo Di Gennaro (born 2 June 1994) is an Italian professional footballer who plays as a defender for Serie C Group C club Catania.

== Career ==
=== Ascoli ===
Born in Sant'Elpidio a Mare, Marche region, Di Gennaro started his career at Marche club Ascoli.

=== Parma ===
In June 2011, few days before the closure of 2010–11 financial year, Di Gennaro was swapped with young Parma defender Zsolt Tamási in a no cash involving co-ownership deals. Both 50% registration rights of the players were tagged for €1.7 million; Di Gennaro signed a 4-year contract. Di Gennaro was a player of the reserve team of Parma from 2011 until 2013. On 2 September 2013, the last day of transfer window, Parma sent Di Gennaro back to Ascoli as well as loaned goalkeeper Stefano Russo to the same team on the same day.

Di Gennaro made his professional debut in 2013–14 Lega Pro Prima Divisione on 6 October 2013, against Grosseto. He was the unused bench on round 3.

On 20 June 2014 Di Gennaro, Pasqualini and Gragnoli were acquired by Parma outright, with Colomba was also bought back by Parma, however Di Gennaro also signed by Ascoli Picchio in 2-year loan; on 1 July 2014 Tamási also returned to Parma; on 18 July 2014 Ascoli signed Bright Addae as well as released Storani on 29 July, whom joint-contracted with Parma.

=== Renate ===
On 22 July 2014 Di Gennaro was loaned to Renate. on 25 June 2015 Di Gennaro became a free agent, after the bankruptcy of Parma F.C. On 9 July he signed a new 3-year contract.

=== Livorno ===
In 2018 he signed for Livorno.

On 7 September 2020, he signed a 3-year contract with Reggiana. However, 13 days later, Reggiana renounced to buy him.

=== Alessandria ===
On 18 January 2021, he signed a 2.5-year contract with Alessandria.

=== Triestina ===
On 17 August 2022, Di Gennaro moved to Triestina on a two-year deal.

=== Feralpisalò ===
On 31 January 2023, Di Gennaro moved to Feralpisalò on loan with an obligation to buy.
