= Daniele Gragnoli =

Italian footballer (born 1994)

Personal information
- Date of birth: 3 January 1994 (age 32)
- Place of birth: Rome, Italy
- Height: 1.86 m (6 ft 1 in)
- Position: Forward

Youth career
- –2006: Lazio
- –2013: Ascoli

Senior career*
Years	Team	Apps	(Gls)
2012–2014	Ascoli	13	(0)
2014–2015	Parma	0	(0)
2014–2015	→ Gorica (loan)	1	(0)
2015–2016	ASD Monticelli	3	(0)
2016–2017	Olympia Agnonese	27	(10)
2017–2018	Pineto	30	(6)
2018–2019	Città di Anagni Calcio	23	(6)
2019–2020	Lanciano		
2020	SSD Atletico Ascoli		
2021–2022	Civitanovese		
Total		97	(22)

International career
2011	Italy U17	3	(0)
- * Club domestic league appearances and goals

Daniele Gragnoli (born 3 January 1994) is an Italian former professional footballer who plays as a forward.

== Biography ==
Born in Rome, capital of Lazio region as well as the capital of whole Italy, Gragnoli was a youth product of S.S. Lazio. However, he was released during 2005–06 season.

=== Ascoli Picchio ===
After leaving Lazio, Gragnoli became a member of Ascoli Calcio's youth teams. During 2009–10 season, he was the member of under-17 team in National "Allievi" League. From 2010 to 2013 Gragnoli had played 29 games in the reserve league – Campionato Nazionale Primavera. He also made his Serie B debut on 25 August 2012 against Varese, the first round of 2012–13 Serie B. He was a late substitute for Yonese Hanine. In the whole season he made 3 Serie B appearances.

=== Parma ===
On 27 June 2013 Gragnoli was signed by Parma in co-ownership deal in 5-year contract, with Emiliano Storani moved to opposite direction also in co-ownership. Both 50% registration rights of the players were valued €1.6 million. Gragnoli also returned to the city of Ascoli Picchio on 31 July, joining Mirko Ronchi who signed by Parma on 30 July but immediately returned to Ascoli. It also revealed that Ascoli had apparently break-even again (€147,877) and positive net asset (€1,050,445) due to the €3.2 million selling revenue of Gragnoli on 30 June 2013, despite the audit report was rejected.

Gragnoli made 10 more league appearances for Ascoli Picchio in 2013–14 Lega Pro Prima Divisione. Gragnoli also played for the reverse team (under-19 team) as overage player.

During that season, the club, Ascoli Calcio 1898 SpA was declared bankrupted on 17 December 2013, by the court of Ascoli Picchio. The court also estimated the residual value of the assets were €862,000, which the residual value of the players contract such as Storani as well as the value of retained registration rights, such as Gragnoli and Ronchi were valued zero instead of valuing them by flopped historical values. In February 2014 the assets were takeover by the only bid from Ascoli Picchio FC 1898 SpA.

On 20 June 2014 new Ascoli sold Gragnoli, Di Gennaro and Pasqualini to Parma outright, as well as Parma bought back Colomba and Tamási (on 1 July); Ascoli bought Bright Addae from Parma on 18 July in definitive deal; Di Gennaro and Ronchi also signed by Ascoli in temporary deals on 20 June.

On 30 August 2014 he was signed by Slovenian club ND Gorica in temporary deal. On 2 February 2015 the loan of Gragnoli and Modolo were terminated.

=== International career ===
Gragnoli played all 3 games of 2011 UEFA European Under-17 Championship elite round.
