= Alessio Bruno =

Italian footballer (born 1994)

Personal information
- Full name: Alessio Eraldo Bruno
- Date of birth: 24 January 1994 (age 32)
- Place of birth: Olbia, Sardinia, Italy
- Height: 1.90 m (6 ft 3 in)
- Position: Midfielder

Youth career
- –2010: Olbia
- 2010–2013: Vicenza

Senior career*
Years	Team	Apps	(Gls)
2010	Olbia	1	(0)
2010–2013	Vicenza	47	(9)
2013–2014	Pescara		
2013–2014	→ Olbia (loan)		
2014–2016	Olbia		
2016–2017	Calangianus		
2017–2018	US Tonara ASD		
2018	ASD Dorgalese		
2018–2021	ASD Polisportiva Luogosanto		
2021–2023	Porto Rotondo Calcio		
- * Club domestic league appearances and goals as of 11 February 2026

Alessio Eraldo Bruno (born 24 January 1994) is an Italian footballer who plays as a midfielder.

== Biography ==
Born in Olbia, Sardinia, Bruno started his career at hometown club Olbia. He was a member of Giovanissimi under-15 team in the 2007–08 season. He also represented Sardinia regional Giovanissimi representatives in Coppa Nazionale Primavera. Sardinia finished as the second in the group, thus Friuli – Venezia Giulia qualified for the semi-finals.

Bruno was a member of Olbia's Allievi Under-17 team in the 2009–10 season. Bruno also made his first team debut on 9 May 2010, the last match of 2009–10 Lega Pro Seconda Divisione. He replaced Alessandro Esposito in the second half. The team folded at the start of 2010–11 season.

In summer 2010, Bruno joined Serie B club Vicenza Calcio. Bruno remained in the Allievi National League in the first season. Bruno became the member of the reserve from 2011 to 2013 (U20 event until 2012, U19 since 2012). The club also sold Bruno to Pescara on 29 June 2012, the second last day of the 2011–12 financial year, after Vicenza had been relegated to the third division. However the sale of 50% registration rights of Bruno for €400,000 would only for the 50% registration rights of Andrea Cappa, which also priced for €400,000. Vicenza and Pescara made financial benefits in the swap deal as well as in the football field. (Note: In June 2012, Vicenza also swapped Elvis Abbruscato for Stefano Giacomelli (both tagged for €2.3 million); Francesco Caratelli for Filippo Di Pentima (both 50% registration rights tagged for €450,000), both with Pescara. Vicenza also swapped Giulio Cavallari for Richard Gabriel Marcone of Siena, both keeper (50% rights of Cavallari for €768,000; Marcone for €750,000) Among the signing, only Abbruscato and Giacomelli actually played for the first team of their new clubs in 2012–13 season. The swap deal only added a new accounting value on the youth product, but it was only backed by speculative performance on the field in the future. Thus, both clubs had a chance to lose in the future in exchange for short-term profit to admit to the 2012–13 season. In 2011–12 season, Pescara only had €4,758,955 player profit, contains Giacomelli (€2,135,955), Di Pentima (€900,000) and Cappa (€800,000).; Pescara net gain of the year was just €1,586 and a positive net equity of just €2,996,857) Bruno immediately returned to Vicenza in temporary deal as well as Di Pentima also returned to Pescara in temporary. Bruno was awarded the no.20 shirt of the first team but did not play. In June 2013, the four co-ownership deals between Vicenza and Pescara were renewed.

Bruno was awarded the no.37 shirt of the Pescara first team in the 2013–14 season.
