= Tantardini =

Tantardini is an Italian surname. Notable people with the surname include:

- Felice Tantardini (1898–1991), Italian Roman Catholic religious brother
- Riccardo Tantardini (born 1993), Italian footballer
