= Serraiocco =

Serraiocco is an Italian surname. Notable people with the surname include:

- Federico Serraiocco (born 1993), Italian footballer
- Sara Serraiocco (born 1990), Italian actress
