= Gianluca Giovannini =

Italian footballer

Personal information
- Date of birth: 9 December 1983 (age 42)
- Place of birth: Amelia, Italy
- Height: 1.84 m (6 ft 1/2 in)
- Position: Defender

Youth career
- Ternana

Senior career*
Years	Team	Apps	(Gls)
2003–2005	Ternana	0	(0)
2003–2004	→ Legnano (loan)	27	(0)
2004–2005	→ Andria (loan)	20	(0)
2005–2006	Lucchese	7	(0)
2006–2007	Manfredonia	22	(3)
2007–2008	Foligno	28	(0)
2008–2011	Padova	17	(0)
2010–2011	→ Foligno (loan)	21	(1)
2011–2012	Ascoli	14	(1)
2012–2014	Venezia	19	(0)
2014	Pergolettese	9	(0)
2014–2015	Aversa Normanna	13	(0)
2016–2017	Treviso		
2017	Vigontina San Paolo	2	(0)
- * Club domestic league appearances and goals

Gianluca Giovannini (born 9 December 1983) is a former Italian professional footballer.

== Biography ==
=== Ternana ===
Born in Amelia, the Province of Terni, Umbria region, Giovannini started his career at the capital of the province – Terni, for Ternana Calcio. Since 2003 Giovannini left for Serie C clubs in temporary deals. In 2005 Giovannini was signed by Serie C1 club Lucchese in co-ownership deal.

=== Manfredonia & Foligno ===
In June 2006 Ternana bought back Giovannini and re-sold Giovannini to Manfredonia also in co-ownership. In June 2007 Manfredonia acquired Giovannini outright.

However, in August he left for Foligno.

=== Padova ===
In 2008, he was signed by Padova in 3-year contract. On 31 August 2010 Giovannini returned to the city of Foligno, Umbria as part of the deal that Padova signed half of the registration rights of Marco Gallozzi.

=== Ascoli & Venezia ===
On 18 August 2011 Ascoli signed Giovannini outright for free in 1-year deal as part of the deal that Padova acquired another 50% registration rights of Jonas Portin from Ascoli.

In July 2012 he trained with A.S. Gubbio 1910 but refused to sign a contract on 23 July. In September 2012 he joined Venezia in 2-year contract.
