= Andrea Cappa =

Italian footballer (born 1993)

Personal information
- Date of birth: 21 February 1993 (age 33)
- Place of birth: Rome, Italy
- Height: 1.83 m (6 ft 0 in)
- Position: Goalkeeper

Youth career
- –2007: GSD Nuova Tor Tre Teste
- 2009–2012: Pescara

Senior career*
Years	Team	Apps	(Gls)
2011–2012	Pescara	1	(0)
2012	→ Teramo (loan)	1	(0)
2012–2015	Vicenza	5	(0)
2012–2013	→ Chieti (loan)	5	(0)
2015	→ Teramo (loan)	0	(0)
2018–2019	ASD Tor Sapienza		
- * Club domestic league appearances and goals as of 11 February 2026

Andrea Cappa (born 21 February 1993) is an Italian footballer who plays as a goalkeeper.

== Biography ==
=== Pescara ===
Born in Rome, Lazio, Cappa left for Abruzzo club Pescara at young age. In 2006–07 season he was the member of Rome's Tor Tre Teste; He was the member of Pescara's Allievi under-17 team in 2009–10 season. From July 2010 to January 2012, he spent 1 1/2 seasons for the under-20 reserve of Pescara. However, he also played for the reserve B in 2010–11 season. Cappa also made his senior debut for the first team on 4 September 2011, against Modena. On 11 January 2012 Cappa left Pescara to Serie D club Teramo, with Riccardo Ragni returned to Pescara as backup keeper; the reserve were played by Salvatore Falso and overage player Francesco Cattenari.

Teramo won promotion back to fully professional league in 2012; Pescara also promoted to Serie A in the same time.

=== Vicenza ===
On 29 June 2012, second last day of the financial year of "Vicenza Calcio S.p.A." and "Delfino Pescara 1936 S.r.l.", both clubs made swap deals, which saw Elvis Abbruscato for Stefano Giacomelli (both tagged for €2.3 million); Francesco Caratelli for Filippo Di Pentima (both 50% registration rights tagged for €450,000) and Alessio Bruno for Cappa (both 50% registration rights tagged for €400,000). Vicenza also made similar deal that saw that swapped Giulio Cavallari for Richard Gabriel Marcone of Siena, both keepers. The swap deals made the clubs also had huge financial benefit as well as in the football field. (Note: In 2011–12 season, Pescara only had €4,758,955 player profit, contains Giacomelli (€2,135,955), Di Pentima (€900,000) and Cappa (€800,000); Pescara net gain of the year was just €1,586 and a positive net equity of just €2,996,857; After Pescara relegated at the end of 2012–13 Serie A, Pescara released Abbruscato who had a residual account value of around €1.15 million.) Cappa signed a 3-year contract.

Marcone was immediately left Vicenza in temporary deal, but Cappa remained for Vicenza's third division campaign, along with Nicola Maggio who was on trial. Cappa played once in the friendly. He also received call-up against Empoli in 2012–13 Coppa Italia. However Cappa was a surplus to team after Vicenza re-admitted to Serie B to replace Lecce as well as signing Stefano Fortunato and Achille Coser (swap with Alessandro Bastrini).

Cappa was signed by Chieti on 28 August 2012. In the whole 2012–13 Lega Pro Seconda Divisione, Cappa was the understudy of Ivano Feola, who just 2-year older than Cappa. However Cappa was the first choice of Chieti in the promotion playoffs, which the team was eliminated in the first round (semi-final).

In June 2013 the co-ownership deals between Pescara and Vicenza were renewed despite the relegation of Vicenza.
