= Sbardella =

Sbardella is a surname. Notable people with the surname include:

- Antonio Sbardella (1925–2002), Italian football player
- Simone Sbardella (born 1993), Italian footballer
- Vittorio Sbardella (1935–1994), Italian politician
