= Jens Portin =

Finnish footballer (born 1984)

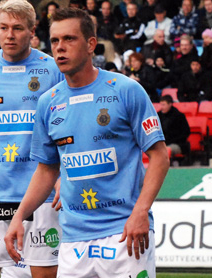
- Portin with Gefle in 2012

Personal information
- Full name: Jens Olof Portin
- Date of birth: 13 December 1984 (age 41)
- Place of birth: Jakobstad, Finland
- Height: 1.88 m (6 ft 2 in)
- Position: Defender

Senior career*
Years	Team	Apps	(Gls)
2004–2009	FF Jaro	95	(1)
2010–2017	Gefle IF	184	(1)

International career
2005	Finland U21	4	(0)
- * Club domestic league appearances and goals as of 21 April 2018

Jens Portin (born 13 December 1984) is a retired Finnish association footballer.

He spent his career at FF Jaro in Veikkausliiga and with Gefle IF in Allsvenskan, the Swedish premier division of football. His younger brother Jonas is also a former professional footballer.

Later after his retirement, Portin started to study aviation. He is currently a Finnair pilot since 2023.

== Career statistics ==
As of 1 September 2024.

Appearances and goals by club, season and competition
Club	Season	League			Cup (Note: Includes Suomen Cup and Svenska Cupen)		League cup (Note: Includes Finnish League Cup)		Europe		Total	
Club	Season	Division	Apps	Goals	Apps	Goals	Apps	Goals	Apps	Goals	Apps	Goals
FF Jaro	2004	Veikkausliiga	23	0	–		–		–		23	0
FF Jaro	2005	Veikkausliiga	19	1	–		–		–		19	1
FF Jaro	2006	Veikkausliiga	0	0	–		–		–		0	0
FF Jaro	2007	Veikkausliiga	19	0	–		–		–		19	0
FF Jaro	2008	Veikkausliiga	9	0	–		–		–		9	0
FF Jaro	2009	Veikkausliiga	25	0	0	0	7	0	–		32	0
FF Jaro	Total		95	1	0	0	7	0	0	0	102	1
Gefle IF	2010	Allsvenskan	22	0	3	0	–		2 (Note: Appearances in UEFA Europa League)	0	27	0
Gefle IF	2011	Allsvenskan	21	0	1	0	–		–		22	0
Gefle IF	2012	Allsvenskan	17	0	4	0	–		–		21	0
Gefle IF	2013	Allsvenskan	29	0	4	0	–		6	0	39	0
Gefle IF	2014	Allsvenskan	31	1	1	0	–		–		32	1
Gefle IF	2015	Allsvenskan	28	0	2	0	–		–		30	0
Gefle IF	2016	Allsvenskan	19	0	3	0	–		–		22	0
Gefle IF	2017	Superettan	20	0	0	0	–		–		20	0
Gefle IF	Total		187	1	18	0	0	0	8	0	213	1
Career total			282	2	18	0	7	0	8	0	315	2
