= Davide Colomba =

Italian professional football player (born 1988)

Personal information
- Date of birth: 19 July 1988 (age 38)
- Place of birth: Bologna, Italy
- Height: 1.75 m (5 ft 9 in)
- Position: Midfielder

Senior career*
| Years | Team | Apps | (Gls) |
| 2007–2008 | Bologna | 1 | (0) |
| 2008–2010 | Foggia | 22 | (2) |
| 2010–2011 | SPAL | 15 | (0) |
| 2011–2014 | Parma | 0 | (0) |
| 2011–2012 | → Crotone (loan) | 0 | (1) |
| 2012–2014 | → Ascoli (co-ownership) | 31 | (1) |
| 2014 | Pune City | 6 | (1) |
- * Club domestic league appearances and goals as of 22 September 2015

Davide Colomba (born 19 July 1988) is an Italian professional football player who last played for Indian club FC Pune City.

A midfielder, he is the son of Franco Colomba, who brought Davide to Italian side Parma F.C. when he had been head coach there in the summer of 2011, as well as FC Pune City in the summer of 2014.

== Career ==
Davide started his career at Bologna, which also trained his father at youth. Davide made his Serie B debut on 12 January 2008 against Mantova. Davide joined Foggia in 2008 for an undisclosed fee. In 2010, he was signed by SPAL 1907.

=== Parma ===
In July 2011 Parma swapped the full registration rights of Colomba to 50% registration rights of Francesco Pambianchi and Alessandro Vecchi directly, for €450,000 nominal value in accounting. The profit did not prevent the fold of SPAL. Colomba signed a 3-year contract and was immediately on loan to Serie B club Crotone.

=== Ascoli ===
On 29 June 2012 Parma bought half of the registration rights of Lorenzo Pasqualini for €1.25 million with half of the rights of Colomba moved to Ascoli for €1.1 million, thus only €150,000 cash was involved. Colomba signed a 5-year contract. Colomba followed Ascoli relegated to the third division in 2013.

In June 2014 Parma bought back Colomba for a peppercorn fee, as well as Pasqualini, Di Gennaro, Gragnoli outright also for a peppercorn. That summer also saw the return of Tamási to Parma on 1 July; Ascoli released Parma half owned Storani on 29 July as well as signing Addae from Parma on 18 July.

=== Pune City ===
In summer 2014 Davide and his father Franco were signed by Indian team FC Pune City.
