= Daniele Martinelli =

Italian footballer (born 1982)

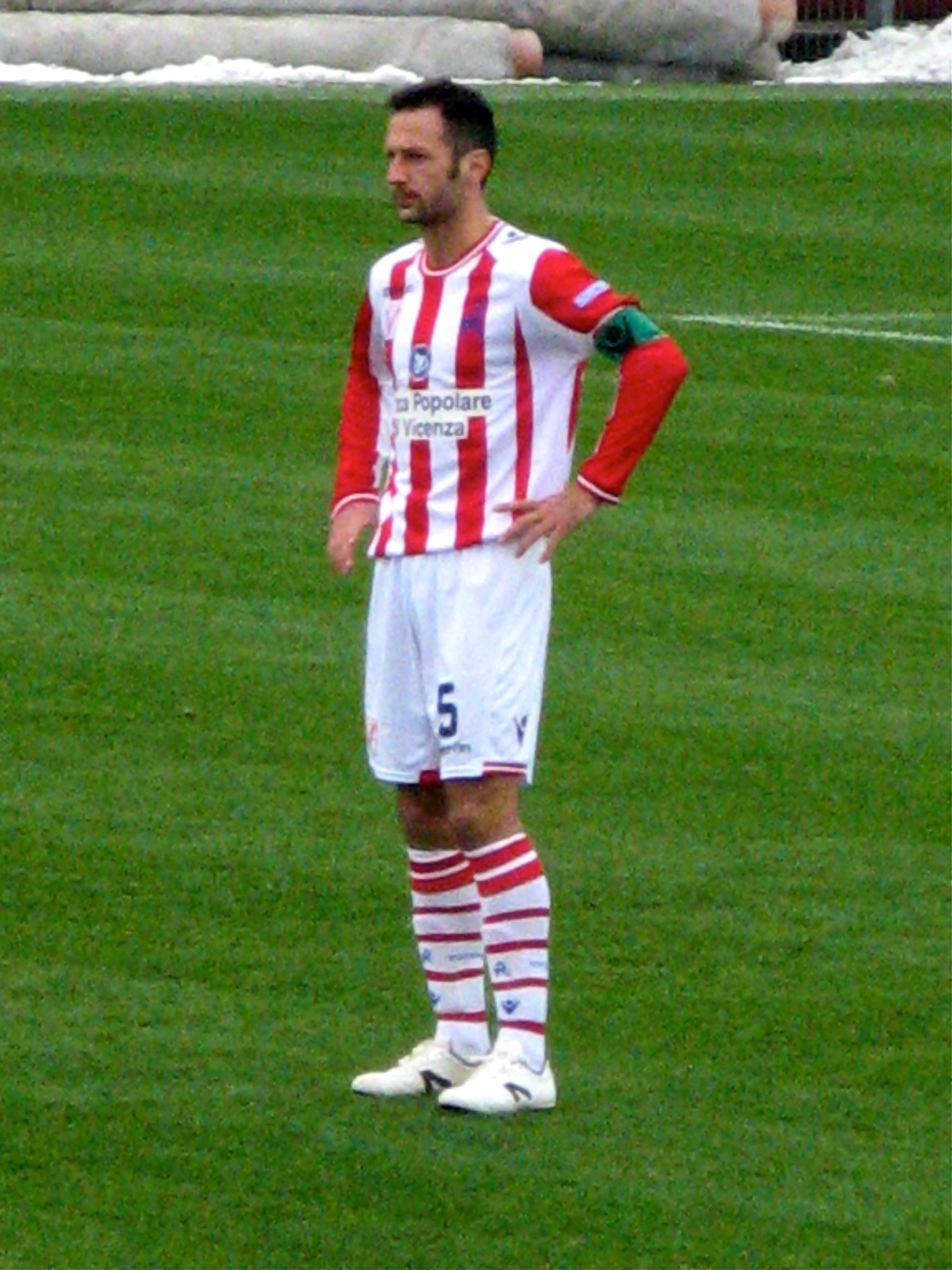

Personal information
- Date of birth: 27 February 1982 (age 44)
- Place of birth: Turin, Italy
- Height: 1.81 m (5 ft 11 in)
- Position: Defender

Youth career
- Torino

Senior career*
Years	Team	Apps	(Gls)
2000–2005	Torino	27	(1)
2002–2003	→ Siena (loan)	11	(0)
2004–2005	→ Ternana (loan)	27	(0)
2005–2014	Vicenza	252	(6)
2013–2014	→ Trapani (loan)	19	(0)
2014–2016	Trapani	14	(0)
2015–2016	→ Bassano (loan)	16	(0)

International career
1998–1999	Italy U16	7	(0)
1999	Italy U17	1	(0)
2001	Italy U18	1	(0)
2001–2002	Italy U20	7	(0)
- * Club domestic league appearances and goals as of 15 May 2016

Daniele Martinelli (born 27 February 1982) is an Italian football defender.

On 10 July 2014 Martinelli and Richard Gabriel Marcone were signed by Trapani outright.
