= Alessandro Vecchi =

Italian footballer (born 1991)

Personal information
- Date of birth: 7 March 1991 (age 35)
- Place of birth: Guastalla, Italy
- Position: Centre-back

Youth career
- Parma
- 2010–2011: → SPAL (loan)

Senior career*
Years	Team	Apps	(Gls)
2011–2012	Parma	0	(0)
2011–2012	→ SPAL (loan)	7	(0)
2012–2014	Mantova	30	(2)

International career
2008	Italy U17	1	(0)
2009	Italy U19	3	(0)
- * Club domestic league appearances and goals

Alessandro Vecchi (born 7 March 1991) is an Italian footballer who played professionally for SPAL and Mantova. A centre-back, he is known for his eye for goal.

== Club career ==
Born in Guastalla, in Emilia region, Vecchi started his career at Emilian club Parma. In 2010, he left for Lega Pro Prima Divisione club SPAL in temporary deal. However, he only able to play in the reserve league. In July 2011 Vecchi and Francesco Pambianchi were moved to SPAL in co-ownership deal, for €200,000 and €250,000 respectively, as a direct swap with Davide Colomba (price tag €450,000), the son of Parma's head coach at that time, Franco Colomba.

SPAL was expelled from the professional league in July 2012, thus Pambianchi and Vecchi returned to Parma on a free transfer. In August 2012 Vecchi joined Lega Pro Seconda Divisione club Mantova F.C. He remained in Mantua for 2013–14 season. The club qualified to the 2014–15 Serie C as the 8th placed team in Group A of the 2013–14 Lega Pro Seconda Divisione.

== International career ==
Vecchi played for the Italy U-17 team in the team's 2008 UEFA European Under-17 Football Championship elite qualification campaign. He played once, in the last match, in which he replaced Luca Caldirola as the team's centre-back. Vecchi played 3 times for the Italy U-19 team: against Ukraine, Denmark and the Netherlands.
