= Diego Manzoni =

Italian footballer (born 1990)

Personal information
- Date of birth: 4 August 1990 (age 36)
- Place of birth: Italy
- Position: Goalkeeper

Youth career
- ?–2008: Pergocrema
- 2007–2008: → Genoa (loan)

Senior career*
| Years | Team | Apps | (Gls) |
| 2008–2009 | Pergocrema | 2 | (0) |
| 2009 | → Merate (loan) | 9 | (0) |
| 2009–2012 | Parma | 0 | (0) |
| 2012–2015 | Genoa | 0 | (0) |
| Total | | 11 | (0) |
- * Club domestic league appearances and goals

Diego Manzoni (born 4 August 1990) is an Italian former footballer who played as a goalkeeper.

== Career ==
=== Early career ===
A youth product of Pergocrema, Manzoni was loaned to Serie A club Genoa C.F.C. in 2007–08 season. Manzoni was on the bench in 2008 Torneo di Viareggio, as the backup of Mirko Lamantia.

=== Parma ===
Manzoni was signed by Parma on 31 August 2009 in a direct player swap, for €500,000. Francesco Pambianchi and Niccolò Galli moved to Pergocrema in co-ownership deal for a total fee of €500,000 (However both player had joined the club in January and July 2009 in co-ownership for peppercorn already, and Parma bought back for peppercorn and resold for a total of €500,000). Manzoni signed a 5-year contract. He did not have a shirt number in the first team nor had a place in the youth team (which played by overage player Stefano Russo instead) In 2010-11 season, he remained at Parma's youth team as overage player, however he did not play any game.

=== Ghost player ===
On 29 June 2011, 2 days before the closure of 2010–11 financial year of "Parma F.C. S.p.A.", he joined Genoa in co-ownership deal, for €1.7 million in a 4-year contract, but in July returned to Parma on loan. However, he still did not have a first team squad number and new signing Alberto Gallinetta became the third keeper of the team. The co-ownership was renewed in June 2012, 2013 and 2014. In 2015 the contract and the co-ownership finally expired, making Genoa having a co-ownership income of €1.7 million, as well as a loss to Parma's account for the same amount. Parma bankrupted in March 2015 and fold in June.
