= Francesco Pambianchi =

Italian footballer

Personal information
- Date of birth: 12 January 1989 (age 37)
- Place of birth: Urbino, Italy
- Height: 1.83 m (6 ft 0 in)
- Position: Centre back

Team information
- Current team: Fasano

Youth career
- Parma

Senior career*
| Years | Team | Apps | (Gls) |
| 2008–2009 | Parma | 1 | (0) |
| 2009–2011 | Pergocrema | 13 | (0) |
| 2011–2012 | SPAL | 22 | (0) |
| 2012–2014 | Parma | 0 | (0) |
| 2012–2013 | → Gubbio (loan) | 3 | (0) |
| 2013–2014 | → Foggia (loan) | 13 | (0) |
| 2014–2017 | Taranto | 82 | (1) |
| 2017–2018 | Rende | 32 | (0) |
| 2018–2019 | Catanzaro | 5 | (0) |
| 2019–2021 | Virtus Francavilla | 29 | (0) |
| 2021–2022 | Casertana | 14 | (1) |
| 2022 | Monopoli | 6 | (0) |
| 2022–2023 | Casarano | 20 | (0) |
| 2023– | Fasano | 3 | (0) |

International career
| 2005 | Italy U16 | 4 | (1) |
| 2005 | Italy EYOF | 3 | (0) |
| 2005–2006 | Italy U17 | 10 | (0) |
| 2007 | Italy U18 | 1 | (0) |
| 2006 | Italy U19 | 1 | (0) |
| 2009 | Italy U20 | 1 | (0) |
- * Club domestic league appearances and goals as of 8 October 2023

Francesco Pambianchi (born 12 January 1989) is an Italian professional footballer who plays as a centre back for Serie D club Fasano.

== Career ==
Pambianchi began his career with the Parma youth system before being promoted to the first team in 2008.

Pambianchi moved to Pergocrema along with Niccolò Galli in co-ownership on 31 August 2009 for €250,000 each, as part of Diego Manzoni deal. In June 2011 he returned to Parma along with Galli for a total fee of €250,000 (€125,000 each for 50% rights), with Makris Petrozzi left for Pergocrema in co-ownership deal for the same price.

He was re-sold to SPAL in new co-ownership deal in July 2011, along with Alessandro Vecchi, for €250,000 and €200,000 respectively, and Davide Colomba joined Parma in definitive deal also for €450,000. After SPAL lost all their players due to financial irregularities, Parma loaned the player to Gubbio.

On 26 August 2013, he joined Foggia Calcio on loan.

On 8 June 2018, Catanzaro announced via their official website that they had signed Pambianchi for the 2018–19 season.

On 27 July 2019, he signed with Virtus Francavilla.

On 6 September 2021, he joined Casertana in Serie D. On 31 January 2022 Pambianchi moved to Monopoli.

On 19 July 2022, Pambianchi returned to Serie D and signed with Casarano.
