= Miloš Malivojević =

Italian footballer

Personal information
- Date of birth: 29 May 1993 (age 33)
- Place of birth: Scandiano, Italy
- Position: Winger

Team information
- Current team: Vicenza

Youth career
- –2012: Parma
- 2010–2011: → Scandianese (loan)

Senior career*
Years	Team	Apps	(Gls)
2012–2013	Parma	0	(0)
2012–2013	→ Renate (loan)	21	(5)
2013–	Vicenza	0	(0)
2014–2015	→ Savoia (loan)	0	(0)
- * Club domestic league appearances and goals

Miloš Malivojević (born 29 May 1993) is an association football player who plays as a midfielder for Italian Serie B club Vicenza.

== Career ==
=== Parma ===
Born in Scandiano, Emilia region, Italy, Malivojević started his career at Emilian club Parma. He was the member of the under-17 team in 2009–10 season. He scored 2 goals in 2010 Torneo Città di Arco, which he was the top-scorer of Parma in the tournament as well as the joint-third among the players. In 2010–11 season he returned to Scandiano for Scandianese Calcio. However, he was suffered from groin injury and missed 3 months. After the season Malivojević returned to Parma for its reserve (the under-20 team).

On 4 July 2012 Malivojević left for Italian fourth level club Renate along with Davide Adorni, Antonio Santurro and Emiliano Storani.

Malivojević was a substitute for Renate in the promotion play-offs first round (semi-finals), both replacing Marco Gaeta at half-time, who plays as a wing forward in the 4–3–3 formation. Eventually Renate lost 1–2 in aggregate to Venezia.

=== Vicenza ===
In June 2013 Malivojević was sold to Italian third-level club Vicenza Calcio in co-ownership, with Mattia Sandrini moved to opposite direction also in co-ownership. Both 50% registration rights of Malivojević and Sandrini were "valued" €600,000 Malivojević signed a 5-year contract.

Malivojević only able to play for Vicenza in friendlies and once in 2013–14 Coppa Italia Lega Pro.

He injured his feet in May 2014.

In 2014–15 season Malivojević also played a few friendly games in pre-season. However, on 1 September 2014 Malivojević and team-mate Davide D'Appolonia were left for Savoia on temporary deals.
