= Mattia Monticone =

Italian footballer

Personal information
- Full name: Mattia Nanni Monticone
- Date of birth: 11 May 1994 (age 32)
- Place of birth: Genoa, Italy
- Height: 1.81 m (5 ft 11 in)
- Position: Defender

Team information
- Current team: Sanremese
- Number: 13

Youth career
- –2013: Sampdoria

Senior career*
Years	Team	Apps	(Gls)
2012–2013	Sampdoria	0	(0)
2013	→ Pavia (loan)	10	(0)
2013–2016	Lumezzane	53	(2)
2016–2017	Savona	26	(2)
2017–2021	Folgore Caratese	117	(9)
2021–2023	Città di Varese	65	(2)
2023–2024	Prato	23	(1)
2024–	Sanremese	63	(2)

International career
2012	Italy U18	1	(0)
2012	Italy U19	1	(0)
- * Club domestic league appearances and goals as of 25 June 2026

Mattia Nanni Monticone (born 11 May 1994) is an Italian professional footballer who plays as a defender for Serie D club Sanremese.

== Career ==
Born in Genoa, Italy, Monticone started his career at Genoese club Sampdoria. In January 2013 he left for Pavia on loan. On 2 July 2013, he was sent to Italian third division club Lumezzane in co-ownership deal.

On 9 June 2021, Monticone joined Città di Varese.
