= Mattia Sandrini =

Italian footballer

Personal information
- Date of birth: 26 October 1993 (age 33)
- Place of birth: Arzignano, Veneto, Italy
- Height: 1.80 m (5 ft 11 in)
- Position: Midfielder

Team information
- Current team: Bassano

Senior career*
Years	Team	Apps	(Gls)
2012–2013	Vicenza	0	(0)
2012–2013	→ Viareggio (loan)	17	(1)
2013–2015	Parma	0	(0)
2013–2015	→ Real Vicenza (loan)	28	(2)
2015–2017	Arzignano	29	(1)
2017–2019	Legnago	20	(1)
2019–2021	Castelbaldo Masi		
2021	Arcella		
2021	Vigasio		
2021–	Bassano	1	(0)
- * Club domestic league appearances and goals as of 20 December 2023

Mattia Sandrini (born 26 October 1993) is an Italian footballer who plays for Serie D club Bassano.

== Biography ==
=== Vicenza ===
Sandrini started his professional career at Vicenza; he was the member of the youth team, such as for under-17 team in 2009–10 season. That season he was booked 4 times thus suspended once as well as cautioned once in the play-offs. In March 2012 he received his first call-up from the first team, and awarded the no.11 shirt, which left by Giacomo Tulli. In 2012–13 season, Sandrini received call-up to the pre-season camp and also played a few friendlies for Vicenza first team. On 9 August 2012, fellow third division club Viareggio signed Sandrini in 2-year loan; Vicenza later re-admitted to Serie B after the expel of U.S. Lecce.

=== Parma ===
Vicenza relegated again from Serie B in June 2013. On 29 June 2013, the second last day of the financial year of both "Parma SpA" and "Vicenza Calcio SpA", Sandrini was sold to Parma in co-ownership deal in order to contribute the profit in time to 2012–13 season which ended on 30 June. However, Vicenza only got half of the registration rights of Miloš Malivojević as part of the deal, which the acquire cost would contribute to multi-season from 2013–14 season onwards as amortization. Neither Parma and Vicenza announced the transfer of Sandrini, only Lega Serie A announced the deal in the transfer list of its website; Malivojevic was also presented only on 17 July by Vicenza after they successfully submitted enough financial documents to Lega Pro in order to apply for the license for 2013–14 Lega Pro Prima Divisione.

On 11 July 2014 the loan to Real Vicenza was renewed.

=== Castelbaldo Masi ===
On 17 October 2019 it was confirmed, that Sandrini had joined ACD Mattia Sandrini.
