= Simone Sbardella =

Italian footballer

Personal information
- Date of birth: 17 April 1993 (age 33)
- Place of birth: Rome, Italy
- Height: 1.80 m (5 ft 11 in)
- Position: Defender

Team information
- Current team: Ostia Mare
- Number: 19

Youth career
- 2008–2012: Udinese

Senior career*
Years	Team	Apps	(Gls)
2012–2013	Udinese	0	(0)
2012–2013	→ Fano (loan)	16	(2)
2013–2014	Matera	16	(0)
2014–2015	Vallée d'Aoste	25	(5)
2015–2016	Trastevere	27	(0)
2016–2018	Arzachena	57	(1)
2018–2021	Como	35	(2)
2021	Trastevere	21	(1)
2021–	Ostia Mare	67	(4)
- * Club domestic league appearances and goals as of 20 December 2023

Simone Sbardella (born 17 April 1993) is an Italian footballer who plays as a defender for Serie D club Ostia Mare.

== Career ==
=== Como ===
In June 2019, Sbardella signed a two-year contract extension with the club.

=== Serie D ===
On 21 January 2021, he returned to Trastevere.
