= Federico Serraiocco =

Italian footballer

Personal information
- Date of birth: 27 September 1993 (age 33)
- Place of birth: Pescara, Italy
- Height: 1.93 m (6 ft 4 in)
- Position: Goalkeeper

Team information
- Current team: L'Aquila (goalkeeping coach)

Youth career
- Pescara
- 2010–2011: Chievo

Senior career*
Years	Team	Apps	(Gls)
2011–2014	Teramo	88	(0)
2014–2017	Brescia	1	(0)
2014–2015	→ Teramo (loan)	6	(0)
2015	→ Vicenza (loan)	0	(0)
2017–2019	Carpi	2	(0)
2020	Vis Pesaro	2	(0)
2022–2024	ASD Turris Calcio Val Pescara		
Total		99	(0)
- * Club domestic league appearances and goals

Federico Serraiocco (born 27 September 1993) is an Italian former footballer who plays as a goalkeeper and goalkeeping coach for Italian Serie D club L'Aquila.

== Biography ==
Serraiocco was born in Pescara, in the Abruzzo region. He began his football career with his hometown club, Pescara, playing for the under-13 team in the 2005–06 season through to the under-17s in 2009–10. In the 2010–11 season he was signed by Chievo. He was a member of their reserve team, but never played first-team football, and was released at the end of the season.

Serraiocco returned to Abruzzo to sign for Teramo. He was the first choice goalkeeper in the 2011–12 Serie D season with 26 appearances, and helped the club win promotion back to the professional league. Teramo finished third in Group B in the 2013–14 Lega Pro Seconda Divisione season, thus qualifying for the 2014–15 Serie C season. They also sold Serraiocco to Serie B club Brescia on 31 January 2014 in a co-ownership arrangement whereby the player would spend the rest of the season with Teramo. In June 2014 the co-ownership deal was renewed.

In January 2015, Serraiocco signed on loan for Vicenza of Serie B.

On 12 February 2020, he signed with Serie C club Vis Pesaro until the end of the 2019–20 season. After leaving Vis Pesaro, Serraiocco was without a club for two years until signing with Promozione side Turris Calcio Pescara in September 2022.
