= Niccolò Galli (footballer, born 1988) =

Italian footballer

Personal information
- Date of birth: 16 September 1988 (age 38)
- Place of birth: Parma, Italy
- Height: 1.80 m (5 ft 11 in)
- Position: Midfielder

Youth career
- Parma

Senior career*
Years	Team	Apps	(Gls)
2009–2011	Pergocrema	11	(0)
2010	→ Lecco (loan)	14	(2)
2011–2012	Parma	0	(0)
2011–2012	→ Verona (loan)	11	(1)
2012–2014	Padova	11	(1)
2013–2014	→ Cesena (loan)	0	(0)
2014–2015	Carrarese	15	(4)
2015–2016	Rimini	10	(0)
2016–2017	Renate	13	(0)

International career
2007–2008	Italy U20	3	(0)
- * Club domestic league appearances and goals as of 2 March 2017 (UTC)

Niccolò Galli (born 16 September 1988) is an Italian professional footballer who plays as a midfielder.

== Career ==
=== Parma ===
Galli moved to Pergocrema along with Francesco Pambianchi in co-ownership deal for €500,000 in total, and Diego Manzoni moved to Parma also for €500,000.

In June 2011, Parma bought back both players for €250,000 in total, with Makris Petrozzi moved to Pergocrema in a co-ownership deal for the same price. He left on loan to Serie B team Hellas Verona .

=== Padova ===
In June 2012, he was exchanged with Jonas Portin of Padova. Galli signed a 4-year contract. 50% registration rights of both players were "valued" for €2 million, thus no cash was involved. In summer 2013, Padova swapped him with Luca Ceccarelli, both in temporary deals. Padova went bankrupt in the summer of 2014, with Galli still having a contract accounting value of around €2 million on 30 June 2014, in Padova's balance sheet.

=== Lega Pro ===
On 25 August 2014 he was signed by Carrarese in a 1-year contract.

On 13 July 2015 he was signed by Rimini. On 8 January 2016 he left for fellow Lega Pro club Renate.
