= Riccardo Tantardini =

Italian footballer

Personal information
- Date of birth: 6 May 1993 (age 33)
- Place of birth: Lecco, Italy
- Height: 1.78 m (5 ft 10 in)
- Position: Defender

Youth career
- –2012: Atalanta

Senior career*
Years	Team	Apps	(Gls)
2012–2013	Atalanta	0	(0)
2012–2013	→ FeralpiSalò (loan)	23	(0)
2013–2019	FeralpiSalò	101	(3)
- * Club domestic league appearances and goals

Riccardo Tantardini (born 6 May 1993) is a former Italian football defender.

== Club career ==
On 3 June 2019, his club FeralpiSalò announced that he will have to retire from playing due to recurring injuries and will start working for his father's carpentry company in his hometown of Lecco.
