= Yonese Hanine =

Italian footballer (born 1990)

Personal information
- Date of birth: 20 February 1990 (age 36)
- Place of birth: Castiglione delle Stiviere, Italy
- Height: 1.76 m (5 ft 9 1/2 in)
- Position: Midfielder

Youth career
- ?–2010: Chievo

Senior career*
Years	Team	Apps	(Gls)
2009–2012	Chievo	2	(0)
2010–2011	→ Crotone (loan)	8	(0)
2011–2012	→ Barletta (loan)	17	(0)
2012–2014	Ascoli	8	(1)
2013	→ Aprilia (loan)	8	(0)
2021-2022	→ Castiglione delle Stiviere	0	(0)
- * Club domestic league appearances and goals

Yonese Hanine (born 20 February 1990) is an Italian footballer who plays as a midfielder.

== Career ==
=== Chievo ===
Hanine made his team debut on 31 May 2009, the last day of the 2008–09 Serie A season. In 2009–10 season, he played 2 Coppa Italia matches as starters and scored once. He also played once at Serie A on 6 December 2009, substituted Luca Rigoni in the 73rd minute.

In July 2010, he graduated from Primavera under-20 football team, and loaned to Serie B team F.C. Crotone. In July 2011 he was signed by Barletta.

=== Ascoli ===
On 28 June 2012, 2 days before the closure of financial year of both "AC ChievoVerona srl" and "Ascoli Calcio 1898 SpA", Hanine moved to Ascoli Piceno in co-ownership deal for €500,000 in 5-year contract, with youngster Lorenzo Marchionni moved to opposite direction for €580,000. In January 2013 he was loaned to Aprilia.

On 17 October 2014 Hanine was released by Ascoli.
