= Jonas Portin =

Finnish footballer (born 1986)

Personal information
- Full name: Jonas Lennart Portin
- Date of birth: 30 September 1986 (age 40)
- Place of birth: Jakobstad, Finland
- Height: 1.89 m (6 ft 2 in)
- Position: Defender

Senior career*
Years	Team	Apps	(Gls)
2005–2009	Jaro	82	(2)
2009–2010	Ascoli	34	(0)
2010–2012	Padova	19	(1)
2012–2013	Parma	0	(0)
2012	→ Padova (loan)	0	(0)

International career^{‡}
	Finland U19	11	(1)
–2009	Finland U21	21	(2)

Managerial career
- 2019–2020: Jaro (assistant)
- * Club domestic league appearances and goals as of 9 November 2011 ‡ National team caps and goals as of 6 September 2011

Jonas Lennart Portin (born 30 September 1986) is a Finnish football coach and a former footballer who played as a defender. Portin had represented Ascoli and Padova of Serie B, the second-tier league of football in Italy.

== Club career ==
=== Jaro ===
Portin started his senior career in Veikkausliiga team FF Jaro. He made his debut at the senior level in 2005 with FF Jaro. In 2006, he became a regular player in Jaro's starting eleven.

=== Ascoli ===
In 2009, he transferred to Serie B club Ascoli.

=== Padova ===
On 31 August 2010 he was transferred from Ascoli to Padova for €900,000 in co-ownership deal in 3-year contract. Co-currently Ascoli signed Vasco Faísca for free. and Marc Lewandowski in temporary deal.

In August 2011 Padova acquired Portin outright for €450,000; Gianluca Giovannini also moved to Ascoli for free.

=== Parma and retirement ===
In June 2012, days before the closing of the financial year of Parma on 30 June (Padova ended the financial year on 31 December), Parma signed Portin in co-ownership deal for a nominal account value of €2 million, in 3-year contract; co-currently Padova signed Niccolò Galli also in co-ownership deal for €2 million, thus a pure player exchange deal. The deal boosted both club financially as well as benefit in the field. (Note: Parma made a profit €3.875 million for Galli.; Padova made a profit of €3.4 million for Portin, both counter-weight by the amortization of Galli (€4 million in 4 years) and Portin (€4 million in 3-year, later decreased to €2.667 million in 3-year))

Portin immediately returned to Padova in temporary deal. However Portin was forced to retire from playing football on 3 August 2012 following the discovery of a rare heart defect which could have been life-threatening if he continued to play. Portin's team honoured him on 25 August 2012 by displaying his shirt after a goal against Lanciano.

Parma write-down the accounting value of Portin backdated to 2011–12 financial year, not fully but from €4 million to €2.667 million. Despite Portin was retired, along with Galli, the two co-ownership deals were renewed technically on 20 June 2013. On 30 June 2013 Portin finally released by Parma, which the club had to write down €1,777,778 on 30 June 2013 as well as bore an amortization cost of €888,889 in 2012–13 financial year. However it also counter-weight by the financial income of €2 million as Parma did not have to pay for the remain 50% registration rights. However, it was yet another financial trick as Parma suffered a €2 million loss in 2013–14, as Padova never able to buy Galli outright for another €2 million cash.

== International career ==
Portin was also a member of Finland national under-21 football team.

== Personal life ==
His older brother Jens is also a professional footballer, previously representing Gefle IF in Sweden.

== Career statistics ==
As of 1 September 2024.

Appearances and goals by club, season and competition
Club	Season	League			Cup (Note: Includes Suomen Cup and Coppa Italia)		League cup		Total	
Club	Season	Division	Apps	Goals	Apps	Goals	Apps	Goals	Apps	Goals
Jaro	2005	Veikkausliiga	1	0	–		–		1	0
Jaro	2006	Veikkausliiga	24	0	–		–		24	0
Jaro	2007	Veikkausliiga	25	1	–		–		25	1
Jaro	2008	Veikkausliiga	24	1	–		–		24	1
Jaro	2009	Veikkausliiga	9	0	0	0	7	0	16	0
Jaro	Total		83	2	0	0	7	0	90	2
Ascoli	2009–10	Serie B	34	0	2	0	–		36	0
Padova	2010–11	Serie B	10	0	1	0	–		11	0
Padova	2011–12	Serie B	9	1	1	0	–		10	1
Padova	Total		19	1	2	0	0	0	21	1
Parma	2012–13	Serie A	0	0	0	0	–		0	0
Career total			136	3	4	0	7	0	147	3
