= US Pergolettese 1932 =

Italian football club

Pergolettese
- Full name: Unione Sportiva Pergolettese; 1932 Srl
- Nicknames: Pergo, Cannibali (Cannibals), Canarini (Canaries)
- Founded: 1932; 2012 (refounded)
- Ground: Stadio Giuseppe Voltini, Crema, Italy
- Capacity: 4,095
- Chairman: Massimiliano Marinelli
- Manager: Antonio Giosa
- League: Serie C Group A
- 2025–26: Serie C Group A, 16th of 20
Home colours	Away colours

Unione Sportiva Pergolettese 1932 is an Italian association football club, based in Crema, province of Cremona, Lombardy. It currently plays in Serie C, the third level of Italian football.

== History ==
=== From Pergolettese to Pergocrema ===
The origins of the football in Crema go back to 1932 when U.S. Pergolettese was founded in Pergoletto, a suburb of the town.

In 1974 the club was renamed U.S. Pergocrema 1932.

In the Serie C2 2007–08 regular season the team finished first in Girone A, winning direct promotion to the now called Lega Pro Prima Divisione for the 2008–09 season. In that season Pergocrema obtain an historical 11th place, the best result of all times for the team.

In the 2009-10 Lega Pro Season, Pergocrema finished 15th and were forced to play in the relegation playoffs. They were matched up against 16th-placed Pro Patria, and survived by being the higher classified team after the 2-legged playout finished in a 3–3 aggregate tie.

=== The bankruptcy and rebirth ===
On 20 June 2012 with the club in strong financial difficulty, Pergocrema was declared bankrupt by the court of Crema and the team was disbanded.

The club generated paper-profit by selling Diego Manzoni for €500,000 in 2009 but directly in exchange for two players Francesco Pambianchi and Niccolò Galli for €250,000 each. In June 2011, one year before the bankruptcy, both players returned to Parma for €125,000 each but again in pure exchange deal, for Makris Petrozzi for €250,000.

At the end of the 2011–12 Serie D season, Pizzighettone moved to city of Crema and changed its name to U.S. Pergolettese 1932 in order to continue the football history of U.S. Pergocrema 1932.

Pergolettese was promoted to 2013–14 Lega Pro Seconda Divisione in 2013. The club returned to professionalism in 2019 after winning the Serie D/C title against the likes of fallen giants Modena and Reggio Audace (formerly Reggiana), under the tenure of former Serie A defender Matteo Contini as head coach.

== Colors and badge ==
The team's colors are yellow and blue. The badge is a yellow shield with a blue oblique stripe with written inside "Pergolettese".

== Supporters and rivalries ==
The fans of Pergolettese are allied with fans of Piacenza, because of the common enmity towards the fans from Cremona, the Cremonese. The fans also maintain friendships with the fans of Benevento, Nuorese and the Belgian Union Saint-Gilloise fans from Brussels.

They contest the city derby with AC Crema, with whom they share their stadium. They also have strong rivalries with Mantova, Pro Patria, Trento, Fanfulla, Sant'Angelo and Lecco.

The most famous organized groups of fans can remember le Brigate, the Cannyballs, the Ultras Pergo 93, and Stoned Again.

== Players ==
=== Current squad ===
As of 1 September 2026.

Note: Flags indicate national team as defined under FIFA eligibility rules; some limited exceptions apply. Players may hold more than one non-FIFA nationality.

No.	Pos.	Nation	Player
1	GK	ITA	Lorenzo Cordaro
4	MF	ITA	Mariano Arini (Captain)
5	DF	ITA	Tommaso Silvestri
7	FW	ITA	Alberto Pala
8	MF	ITA	Riccardo Stronati
9	FW	ITA	Mattia Rossetti
10	MF	ITA	Daniele Ferrandino
11	FW	ITA	Niccolò Corti
12	GK	ITA	Alessandro Asperti
14	FW	ITA	Michael De Marchi
15	DF	ITA	Cristian Dell'Orco
17	DF	ITA	Marco Tamagni
18	MF	ITA	Pietro Avena (on loan from Palermo)

No.	Pos.	Nation	Player
20	MF	ITA	Marco Tremolada
21	FW	ITA	Carlo Evangelista (on loan from Fiorentina)
22	GK	ITA	Filippo Doldi
24	DF	ITA	Davide Pavesi (on loan from Cremonese)
27	FW	ITA	Andrea Pavanello
30	MF	ITA	Alessandro Berretta (on loan from Monza)
49	DF	ITA	Edoardo Zaia (on loan from Torino)
70	DF	ITA	Jacopo Antolini
73	DF	ITA	Emanuele Bassi (on loan from Cremonese)
76	DF	ITA	Luca Roversi
77	MF	ITA	Alessandro Orlandi
80	MF	ITA	Zaid Jaouhari
90	FW	ITA	Matteo Junior Giroletti

== Pictures ==
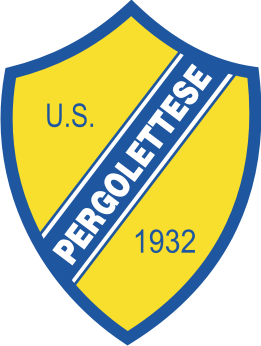
Current logo Pergolettese
