= Stefano Russo (footballer, born 1989) =

Italian footballer

Personal information
- Date of birth: 6 March 1989 (age 37)
- Place of birth: Nardò, Italy
- Height: 1.85 m (6 ft 1 in)
- Position: Goalkeeper

Youth career
- –2008: Lecce
- 2007–2008: → Casarano (loan)

Senior career*
Years	Team	Apps	(Gls)
2008–2009	Lecce	0	(0)
2008–2009	→ Brindisi (loan)	13	(0)
2009–2015	Parma	0	(0)
2011–2012	→ Nocerina (loan)	6	(0)
2012–2013	→ Brescia (loan)	0	(0)
2013–2014	→ Ascoli (loan)	20	(0)
2014–2015	→ Salernitana (loan)	2	(0)
2015–2016	Juve Stabia	17	(0)
2016–2017	Vibonese	39	(0)
2017–2020	Salernitana	0	(0)
2020–2021	Cavese	9	(0)
2021–2022	Reggiana	0	(0)
- * Club domestic league appearances and goals as of 23 April 2022

Stefano Russo (born 6 March 1989) is an Italian footballer who plays as a goalkeeper.

== Career ==
=== Lecce ===
Born in Nardò, the Province of Lecce, Apulia, Russo started his career at U.S. Lecce. He was the backup keeper for Ugo Gabrieli in the youth team. In the 2007–08 and 2008–09 seasons, Russo left for Serie D clubs Virtus Casarano and Brindisi (both Apulia teams). He won promotion to the lowest level of the professional league, the fourth division as Group H winner.

=== Parma ===
In 2009, he was signed by Serie A club Parma. He succeeded departed Andrea Gasparri as the first choice of the "spring" under-20 team, but as an overage player, ahead of Antonio Santurro and Matteo Pisseri. Russo also beat Diego Manzoni to become the third keeper of the team, behind Antonio Mirante and Nicola Pavarini, wearing no.22 which previously owned by Gasparri. The "spring" team entered the playoffs but eliminated by Lazio in the first round (round of 16)

In the 2010–11 season he remained as a third keeper in the first team, ahead of Santurro. Russo changed to wear the No. 16 shirt. He also played twice (round 10 and 19) for the "spring". Daniele Agosti succeeded Russo as first choice that season but only played 14 1/2 out of 26 matches.

==== Nocerina (loan) ====
On 14 July 2011 he left for Serie B newcomer Nocerina. Russo picked No.89, his year of birth as shirt number. Russo was an understudy of Pier Graziano Gori. However Russo played 4 successive games since round 16 (19 November) In round 15 Nocerina only collected 12 points and was the least along with Ascoli if the latter did not have 10 points penalty. In January 2012, the club borrowed Emanuele Concetti, who became the first choice, and Russo was on the bench in round 22 (13 January).

==== Brescia ====
On 29 June 2012, he was swapped with Nicolò Belotti of Brescia Calcio. Both clubs retain 50% registration rights, and both halves of Belotti and Russo were valued at €1.2 million, thus the deal did not involve cash. Russo signed a 3-year contract.

==== Ascoli (loan) ====
On 2 September 2013, both players returned to their mother clubs for €800,000 in 3-year (Belotti) and 2-year (Russo) deals, respectively. Russo was immediately loaned to Ascoli in a temporary deal.

In 2014–15 season he received a call-up from Parma's pre-season camp, However, he failed to enter the first team squad. On 25 July 2014 he was signed by Salernitana in a temporary deal, with an option to sign him outright.

=== Juve Stabia ===
On 14 July 2015 Russo was signed by Juve Stabia.

=== Salernitana ===
On 9 November 2017 he joined Salernitana on a free transfer.

=== Reggiana ===
On 12 November 2021, he signed with Reggiana until the end of the season.

== Honours ==
Brindisi

- Serie D: 2009
