= Emiliano Storani =

Italian footballer (born 1993)

Personal information
- Date of birth: 19 May 1993 (age 33)
- Place of birth: Macerata, Italy
- Height: 1.70 m (5 ft 7 in)
- Position: Attacking midfielder

Team information
- Current team: SSD Spoleto Calcio

Youth career
- Tolentino
- 2009–2010: Parma

Senior career*
Years	Team	Apps	(Gls)
2010–2013	Parma	0	(0)
2010–2011	→ Santegidiese (loan)	22	(1)
2011–2012	→ Sambenedettese (loan)	7	(1)
2012–2013	→ Renate (loan)	5	(0)
2013–2014	Ascoli	2	(0)
2014	Civitanovese	0	(0)
2014	→ Maceratese (loan)	1	(0)
2014–2016	Grottammare		
2016–2017	SS Portorecanati		
2017–2018	Ancona		
2018–2019	ASD San Marco Servigliano		
2019	POL.D. Belfiorese		
2019–2020	ASD Tiberis Macchie		
2020–2021	ASD Potenza Picena		
2021–2022	ASD Casette Verdini		
2022–2023	GS Elfa Tolentino		
2023	Tolentino		
2023–	SSD Spoleto Calcio		
- * Club domestic league appearances and goals as of 7 February 2026

Emiliano Storani (born 19 May 1993) is an Italian footballer who plays as a attacking midfielder for SSD Spoleto Calcio.

== Career ==
Born in Macerata, Marche, Storani was a youth product of Marche club Tolentino. He was a player in Marche "Giovanissimi" Football League in 2006–07 season; In 2007–08 he was selected by Marche "Giovanissimi" representative team.

=== Parma ===
In 2009–10 season Storani was a member of Emilia club Parma. He participated in National "Allievi" League for the under-17 team. Instead of promotion to the reserve team, Storani was transferred to Serie D club Santegidiese in 2010. In 2011, he was signed by fellow fifth division club Sambenedettese.

On 4 July 2012 Storani was signed by a professional club Renate. The club also signed Adorni, Malivojević and Santurro from Parma. However Storani made 5 appearances only in 2012–13 Lega Pro Seconda Divisione. Storani also returned to Parma circa February 2013, for 2013 Torneo di Viareggio.

On 27 June 2013 Storani left Parma.

=== Ascoli Picchio ===
On 27 June 2013 Storani left for Marche team Ascoli in 5-year deal, which the team had relegated from Serie B, with Daniele Gragnoli moved to opposite direction. Both club retained 50% registration rights, as well as valued the 50% registration rights of both players for €1.6 million, which purely a financial trick in the eve of Ascoli's bankruptcy. (Note: Parma also made swap deals with other clubs during the last week of June 2013, which boosted the financial results to just €3,223,792 net loss in the financial year ending on 30 June 2013, as well as net asset of €23,255,291. However selling Storani had already made a notional €3,197,100 profit, in terms of increase in player asset (Gragnoli for €3.2 million). On Ascoli side, the notional €3.2 million revenue from Gragnoli had made the club apparently break-even with net income €147,877 and positive net asset (€1,050,445). However such annual report was not approve by the authority. Ascoli bankrupted on 17 December 2013, which the court of Ascoli Picchio estimated the residual value of the club total assets was €862,000. The court also decided to give a conservative zero value to the retained 50% registration rights that Ascoli owning, such as Gragnoli, and the registration rights of Ascoli players, such as Storani.) Storani played twice for the club in the first half of 2013–14 Lega Pro Prima Divisione. In February 2014 the club was takeover by the only bid from Ascoli Picchio FC 1898 SpA.

On 20 June 2014 new Ascoli and Parma terminated most of the co-ownership deals between them, with Tamási also returned to Parma on 1 July. However, the co-ownership of Storani and Ronchi were renewed to June 2015, also the deadline day of co-ownership before its abolish. However, on 29 July 2014 he was released by Ascoli.

=== Amateur clubs ===
In August 2014 he was signed by Serie D club Civitanovese. in late October he was signed by Maceratese in temporary deal. However, he was released again on 30 November. He immediately left for Grottammare of Eccellenza Marche.
