= Richard Marcone =

Italian footballer

Personal information
- Full name: Richard Gabriel Marcone
- Date of birth: 21 January 1993 (age 33)
- Place of birth: Bucharest, Romania
- Height: 1.84 m (6 ft 1/2 in)
- Position: Goalkeeper

Team information
- Current team: Picerno
- Number: 33

Youth career
- –2007: Esperia
- 2007–2012: Siena

Senior career*
Years	Team	Apps	(Gls)
2012–2014	Vicenza	0	(0)
2012–2013	→ Südtirol (loan)	28	(0)
2013–2014	→ Trapani (loan)	3	(0)
2014–2018	Trapani	16	(0)
2015–2016	→ Vicenza (loan)	1	(0)
2016	→ Hellas Verona (loan)	0	(0)
2016–2017	→ Südtirol (loan)	35	(0)
2017–2018	→ Pro Vercelli (loan)	18	(0)
2018–2019	Cuneo	22	(0)
2019	Rieti	13	(0)
2019–2020	Ternana	1	(0)
2020–2022	Potenza	54	(0)
2022–2023	Avellino	15	(0)
2023–2024	Sorrento	11	(0)
2024–2025	Turris	38	(0)
2025	Parma	0	(0)
2025–	Picerno	34	(0)
- * Club domestic league appearances and goals as of 4 October 2026

Richard Gabriel Marcone (born 21 January 1993) is a professional footballer who plays as a goalkeeper for Serie C Group C club Picerno.

Marcone received an Italy youth national team call-up in 2013.

== Club career ==
=== Siena ===
Born in Bucharest, Romania, Marcone started his professional career at Italian club Siena. On 30 August 2007, he joined the Tuscan team from Esperia on a temporary deal, which would later be made permanent. Marcone was a member of the under-20 team during the 2010–11 and 2011–12 seasons, and previously played for the U17 youth team in 2008–09 and the 2009–10 season. He was the fourth-choice keeper for the 2011–12 Serie A season. He wore the no.93 shirt, representing the year of his birth.

=== Vicenza ===
In June 2012, the club decided to capitalise on his potential market value. Despite there being no interested buyers from Serie A and Serie B clubs, nor could he join the first team immediately, the club used player exchange to give an accounting value to the player, in order to pass the financial benchmark of the FIGC. He was swapped with Giulio Cavallari of Vicenza in a co-ownership deal, while Marcone's teammate, goalkeeper, Alessandro Iacobucci, who spent the 2011–12 season in with South Tyrol, were swapped to Parma along with Pacini and Rossi. Moreover the deal was completed on 29 June 2012, the second to last day of the 2011–12 financial year, which ended on 30 June. However, his new "market" value to his new club, would be a cost in term of amortization as a kind of intangible asset. Half of Marcone was "valued" €750,000 and Cavallari €768,000, made only €18,000 cash involved. Marcone signed a three-year contract.

In July 2012, Marcone left for South Tyrol (German: Südtirol, Italian: Alto Adige) to replace Iacobucci, who left for Spezia, a Serie B club.

The next day, South Tyrol signed Matteo Grandi from Cesena. Marcone became the new first choice, with Grandi deputising.

=== Trapani ===
In June 2013, Siena sold Marcone outright to Vicenza as well as Cavallari to Siena from Vicenza outright. However, both clubs failed to register in Serie B (Siena) and Lega Pro Prima Divisione (Vicenza). On 10 July, Vicenza finally acquired all the documentation required for the new season. However, due to the presence of former Italy under-21 international Carlo Pinsoglio, who was last season's first choice, Marcone joined Trapani on a temporary deal with an option to purchase.

On 10 July 2014, Trapani acquired Marcone outright for €200,000 and Daniele Martinelli outright for an undisclosed fee.

On 21 July 2015, Marcone was re-signed by Vicenza on a temporary deal, with an option to buy. He wore the no.1 shirt for the club.

On 26 January 2016, Marcone was signed by Serie A club Verona. He wore the no.88 shirt for the club.

On 12 July 2016, he was re-signed by South Tyrol. On 31 August 2017, Marcone left for Pro Vercelli.

=== Rieti ===
On 31 January 2019, he joined Rieti.

=== Ternana ===
On 13 September 2019, Marcone joined Ternana on a one-year contract.

=== Potenza ===
On 18 November 2020, he signed for Serie C club Potenza, as a free transfer, re-joining his former Rieti boss Ezio Capuano, and making his debut on the same day in an away game against Palermo.

=== Avellino ===
On 7 July 2022, Marcone joined Avellino on a two-year deal.

=== Parma ===
On 10 January 2025, he joined Serie A club Parma.

== International career ==
In January 2013, Marcone received his first Italy U20 call-up for a training camp and a triangular tournament between U21, U20 and U19. However, he withdrew and was replaced by Alfred Gomis of Torino. Marcone once received a call-up to a goalkeeper training camp in 2008, and was younger than 17 out of the 23 participants.
