= Lorenzo Marchionni =

Italian footballer

Personal information
- Date of birth: 17 August 1994 (age 32)
- Place of birth: Grottazzolina, Italy
- Height: 1.75 m (5 ft 9 in)
- Position: Attacking midfielder

Team information
- Current team: Acireale
- Number: 10

Youth career
- Ascoli
- 2010–2011: → Juventus (loan)

Senior career*
Years	Team	Apps	(Gls)
2011–2012	Ascoli	0	(0)
2012–2016	Chievo	0	(0)
2014–2015	→ Gubbio (loan)	24	(4)
2015–2016	→ Modena (loan)	7	(0)
2016–2017	Pro Piacenza	8	(1)
2018	Fabriano Cerreto	9	(0)
2018–2020	Montegiorgio	51	(8)
2020–2021	San Nicolò Notaresco	38	(6)
2021	Tiferno	2	(0)
2021–2022	Montegiorgio	18	(5)
2022–2023	L'Aquila		
2023–2024	Giulianova		
2024–	Acireale	12	(0)
- * Club domestic league appearances and goals as of 20 November 2024

Lorenzo Marchionni (born 17 August 1994) is an Italian football midfielder who plays for Serie D club Acireale.

== Career ==
Marchionni began his footballing career with Ascoli, and in the summer of 2010 he was loaned to Juventus.

However, after a full season with Juve's Primavera squad, he returned to Ascoli. Marchionni made his first team debut on 14 August 2011, in Coppa Italia victory against Taranto.

In July 2016 Marchionni was signed by Lega Pro club Pro Piacenza.
