= Giulio Cavallari =

Italian footballer

Personal information
- Date of birth: 24 January 1992 (age 34)
- Place of birth: Parma, Italy
- Position: Goalkeeper

Youth career
- Audace (Parma)
- Crociati Noceto
- 2010–2012: Vicenza

Senior career*
| Years | Team | Apps | (Gls) |
| 2012–2014 | Siena | 0 | (0) |
| 2012–2013 | → Bellaria–Igea (loan) | 3 | (0) |
| 2013 | → Gavorrano (loan) | 0 | (0) |
| 2013–2014 | → Real Vicenza (loan) | 3 | (0) |
- * Club domestic league appearances and goals as of 4 April 2014

Giulio Cavallari (born 24 January 1992) is an Italian footballer who plays as a goalkeeper. He has played in the fourth tier of football in Italy.

== Biography ==
Born in Parma in the Emilia region, Cavallari started his career at the Parma club U.S. Audace. He was signed by the Veneto club Vicenza Calcio in 2010, along with Riccardo Santurro. He wore no.17 shirt for the club in 2011–12 Serie B. On 29 June 2012, Cavallari was swapped for Richard Gabriel Marcone of A.C. Siena. 50% registration rights for Cavallari were tagged for €768,000 and Marcone for €750,000. Cavallari was loaned to Bellaria – Igea Marina. He played a few games in pre-season friendlies and three times in 2012–13 Lega Pro Seconda Divisione. On 31 January 2013, Cavallari, Marco Fiore and Federico Meacci were signed by Gavorrano from Bellaria. In June 2013, Cavallari was signed by Siena outright for €760,000 and Vicenza signed Maracone outright for €750,000.
