= Stefano Giacomelli =

Italian footballer (born 1990)

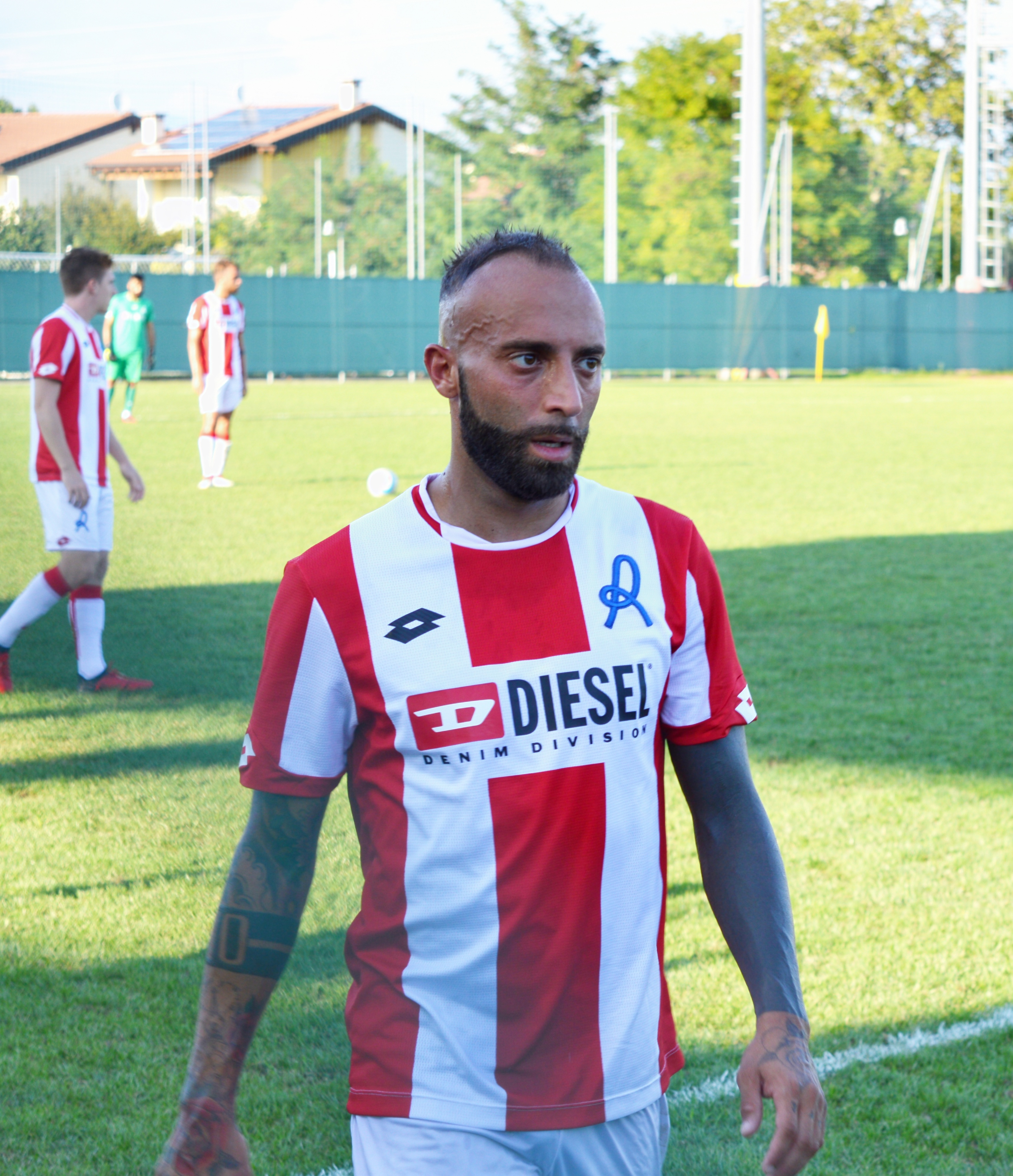
- Giacomelli in 2018

Personal information
- Date of birth: 30 April 1990 (age 36)
- Place of birth: Spoleto, Italy
- Height: 1.70 m (5 ft 7 in)
- Position: Attacking midfielder

Team information
- Current team: ASD Terni FC

Youth career
- –2007: Foligno

Senior career*
| Years | Team | Apps | (Gls) |
| 2007–2011 | Foligno | 77 | (20) |
| 2008–2009 | → Inter Milan (loan) | 0 | (0) |
| 2011–2012 | Pescara | 18 | (1) |
| 2012 | → Ternana (loan) | 10 | (0) |
| 2012–2023 | LR Vicenza | 327 | (42) |
| 2023–2024 | Mantova | 16 | (2) |
| 2024–2025 | Luparense | 23 | (4) |
| 2025– | ASD Terni FC | | |

International career
| 2009–2010 | Italy U20 "C" | 5 | (2) |
| 2010 | Italy U20 | 1 | (0) |
| 2011 | Italy U21 "B" | 2 | (0) |
- * Club domestic league appearances and goals as of 11 February 2026

Stefano Giacomelli (born 30 April 1990) is an Italian footballer who plays as a attacking midfielder for ASD Terni FC.

== Club career ==
=== Foligno ===
Born in Spoleto, Umbria, Giacomelli started his career with Foligno. He made his league debut during 2006–07 Serie C2 season, and often made substitute appearances in the next season, but in Serie C1. In July 2008, he was loaned to the under-20 team of Internazionale, but only scored one goal for the team in the regular season of Campionato Nazionale Primavera, ranked the 5th among the strikers (behind Aiman Napoli, Mattia Destro, Riccardo Bocalon and Mario Balotelli) and ranked equal 9th among the whole team. He also scored one of the two goals of Inter in the playoffs round. He also played as a left midfielder for the Primavera team.

On 1 July 2009 Giacomelli returned to Foligno and scored 13 league goals in 2009–10 season, which is the team joint-topscorer along with Matteo Cavagna, ahead Juan Martin Turchi. In the first half of 2010–11 season, he scored 5 goals as joint team top-scorer at that time, along with Daniele Sciaudone. However, Giacomelli left the club on 31 January, making him ranked as the equal third along with Diego Falcinelli, behind Sciaudone and Matteo Coresi (7 goals) in the whole season.

=== Pescara ===
On 31 January 2011 Giacomelli was sold to Pescara in a co-ownership deal in a 4-year contract, for €140,000 transfer fee. On 25 June 2011 Pescara acquired Giacomelli outright, for another €161,000, by submitting a higher tender bid (to Lega Serie B) against Foligno on the deadline day.

On 30 January 2012, after one full calendar year with Pescara, Giacomelli signed a loan deal with Ternana until the end of the 2011-2012 season.

=== Vicenza ===
In June 2012 he was sold to Lega Pro Prima Divisione club Vicenza Calcio for €2.3 million in a 4-year contract, but in terms of the value of the registration rights of Elvis Abbruscato who joined Pescara also for €2.3M.

On 29 August 2015 Giacomelli signed a new 3-year contract with Vicenza. He signed a new contract again in summer 2017. After the bankruptcy of Vicenza Calcio, Giacomelli signed a new contract with the club's new legal person L.R. Vicenza Virtus on 12 July 2018.

== International career ==
=== Representative teams ===
In June 2008, Giacomelli was capped for the Italy under-20 Lega Pro representative team for the Trofeo Dossena, losing out to the Grêmio youth team following a penalty shootout. As he returned to Lega Pro in the summer of 2009, he was also capped for the representative team at the 2008–09 Mirop Cup, against Slovenia (twice) and at the 2009–11 International Challenge Trophy (against Malta, Romania and Belgium); he scored twice against Belgium.

He also won the 2010 Trofeo Dossena with the Lega Pro representative team, in which he scored the winning goal against the Internacional youth team. With the Italy under-20 A team, he was capped once against Germany at the 2009–10 Four Nations Tournament, replacing Federico Carraro in the first half.

== Honours ==
Foligno

- Serie C2: 2006–07
