= Lorenzo Pasqualini =

Italian footballer

Personal information
- Date of birth: 19 August 1989 (age 37)
- Place of birth: Ascoli Piceno, Italy
- Height: 1.72 m (5 ft 7 1/2 in)
- Position: Left-back

Team information
- Current team: SSD Porto D'Ascoli

Youth career
- –2009: Ascoli

Senior career*
Years	Team	Apps	(Gls)
2009–2010	Brindisi	37	(0)
2010–2012	Ascoli	27	(1)
2011	→ Siracusa (loan)	10	(0)
2012–2015	Parma	0	(0)
2012–2013	→ Ascoli (loan)	39	(0)
2013–2014	→ Crotone (loan)	3	(0)
2014	→ Salernitana (loan)	5	(0)
2014–2015	→ Gorica (loan)	28	(0)
2016–2017	Savona	25	(0)
2017	Massese	8	(0)
2017–2018	Sansepolcro	19	(0)
2018–2019	Jesina	30	(1)
2019–	SSD Porto D'Ascoli		
- * Club domestic league appearances and goals as of 16:24, 1 March 2020 (UTC)

Lorenzo Pasqualini (born 19 August 1989) is an Italian footballer who plays for SSD Porto D'Ascoli.

== Biography ==
=== Ascoli ===
Born in Ascoli Piceno, Marche, Pasqualini started his career at hometown club Ascoli Calcio 1898. He was the member of Allievi U17 team in 2004–05 season. Pasqualini was promoted to the reserve in 2005–06 season; he also received his first senior call-up in May 2006, for the last match of 2005–06 Serie A. He did not made any debut and remained in the reserve for the next 2 1/2 seasons in Campionato Nazionale Primavera.

In January 2009 he graduated from the reserve and left for Serie D club Brindisi in temporary deal. Brindisi promoted back to fully professional league in June 2009 and the club also signed Pasqualini in co-ownership deal.

Pasqualini made 27 league appearances for Brindisi in 2009–10 Lega Pro Seconda Divisione. Both club failed to agree a price for the remain 50% registration rights, thus both clubs submitted their price to Lega Calcio in order to decide the ownership. Eventually Ascoli outbid the fourth division club.

Pasqualini was confirmed as a first-team member in 2010–11 Serie B and chose no.20 shirt. However, he only played twice in 2010–11 season before left for Siracusa in new temporary deal with pre-set price. Siracusa did not excise the option.

In the new season Pasqualini changed to wear no.21 shirt. (Alex Pederzoli changed from 21 to 4) Pasqualini also got more chance to play with 26 appearances in 2011–12 Serie B. Pasqualini was offered a new 3-year contract on 6 June 2012.

=== Parma ===
Due to ongoing financial difficulties Pasqualini was sold to Serie A club Parma F.C. in late June 2012 in co-ownership deal, few days before the closure of financial year on 30 June 2012, for €1.25 million in 5-year contract. However Ascoli only received €150,000 cash and Davide Colomba also in co-ownership deal. Pasqualini immediately returned to Ascoli for another season.

Pasqualini played 39 games (including 35 starts) out of possible 42 games in 2012–13 Serie B. He missed once due to suspension for his 4th caution of the season (yellow card). Ascoli relegated at the end of the season.

In summer 2013 Pasqualini was signed by F.C. Crotone in a temporary deal for free. On 31 January 2014 the loan was terminated. On the same day he was signed by Salernitana in a temporary deal. In June 2014 Parma acquired Pasqualini outright from Ascoli for free.

In August 2014 he was signed by Slovenian club ND Gorica from Parma.

=== Savona ===
After the bankruptcy of Parma, Pasqualini was signed by Savona F.B.C. for 1 1/2-year contract.
