= Zsolt Tamási =

Hungarian footballer (born 1990)

Personal information
- Date of birth: 25 June 1990 (age 36)
- Place of birth: Kalocsa, Hungary
- Height: 1.78 m (5 ft 10 in)
- Position: Midfielder

Youth career
- –2010: Cisco Roma
- 2007–2008: → Udinese (loan)
- 2008–2009: → Triestina (loan)
- 2010: → Parma (loan)

Senior career*
Years	Team	Apps	(Gls)
2007	Cisco Roma	2	(0)
2010–2011	Parma	0	(0)
2010–2011	→ Lanciano (loan)	12	(0)
2011–2014	Ascoli	0	(0)
2011–2013	→ Fondi (loan)	52	(0)
2013–2014	→ Gubbio (loan)	0	(0)
2014	Parma	0	(0)
2014–2015	Paks	22	(0)
2015–2016	Mezőkövesd	14	(0)
2016–2017	Nyíregyháza	24	(2)
2017–2019	Soroksár	64	(6)
2020–2022	III. Kerület	50	(10)
2022–2023	Budapesti VSC	33	(6)
- * Club domestic league appearances and goals as of 1 July 2023

Zsolt Tamási (born 25 June 1990) is a Hungarian football midfielder.

== Career ==
=== Club career ===
Tamási was sold to Ascoli Calcio 1898 for €1.7 million (in co-ownership deal) and Matteo Di Gennaro was joined Parma in exchange, also for €1.7 million in co-ownership deal. Tamási signed a 5-year contract.

In July 2013 Tamási was signed by Gubbio in temporary deal. He played his first match for the club in a friendly on 31 July. In January he comes back to Ascoli.
