= 2011–12 Parma FC season =

Parma
2011–12 season
- President: Tommaso Ghirardi
- Manager: Franco Colomba (until 9 January 2012); Roberto Donadoni (from 9 January 2012)
- Stadium: Stadio Ennio Tardini
- Serie A: 8th
- Coppa Italia: Fourth round
- Top goalscorer: League: Sebastian Giovinco (15); All: Sebastian Giovinco (16)
- Highest home attendance: 19,481 vs Milan (17 March 2012, Serie A)
- Lowest home attendance: 3,624 vs Grosseto (21 August 2011, Coppa Italia)
- Average home league attendance: 13,646
Home colours	Away colours	Third colours

The 2011–12 season was Parma Football Club's 21st season in Serie A and their third consecutive season in that division, having finished 12th the previous season. An up-and-down start to the 2011–12 season saw Parma in a comfortable 10th position after 11 games. However, a six-game winless streak culminating in a 5–0 defeat away to Inter Milan was enough for Ghirardi to let Colomba go on 9 January 2012, despite Parma sitting in 15th position and seven points clear of relegation, having picked up 19 points from 17 games. Roberto Donadoni was chosen as his replacement immediately. Donadoni initially failed to bring about a change in fortunes, but the side won seven matches in a row to set a new club record to finish in eighth position, level on points with Roma.

As well as competing in Serie A, Parma took part in the Coppa Italia, a competition which they exited in the fourth round after losing to Serie B side Hellas Verona.

== Season review ==
=== Pre-season ===
==== Retreat to Levico ====
Parma began their pre-season with the traditional summer retreat on 11 July 2011 in Levico Terme for the second season running. Parma remained in Levico until 29 July. The club's pre-season tour of England and Wales was announced on 13 June and will follow the time spent in Levico. They contested four matches in Levico. The first two were six-goal thrashings against local amateur teams on 16 and 17 July with new boys Graziano Pellè, Fabio Borini and Nicola Sansone all scoring, but the following two were more competitive.

Parma first welcomed mid-table Czech side Slavia Prague to Italy on 20 July, but neither side were able to break the deadlock and the match ended goalless. Three days later, Parma had more success against Bulgarian outfit Ludogorets Razgrad, who had just been promoted to the top tier of Bulgarian football, the Bulgarian A Professional Football Group, for the first time in their history. Parma ran out 3–0 winners Ludogorets with Cristian Zaccardo, Borini and Sebastian Giovinco all on the scoresheet. Parma's final game in Italy before their departure on a tour of the UK was the next day in Cogollo del Cengio against Cogollo, whose president Alberto Rossi had acquired a 5% share in Parma three days earlier. Parma won the match 10–1.

==== Tour of Britain ====
Parma then travelled to the UK to contest four friendly matches against sides who with an earlier start to the English season were likely to have further developed their pre-season fitness. The first match was against Welsh Championship side Cardiff City and it ended goalless with the hosts enjoying the better of the game. Next, Parma travelled east to Bedfordshire to face Conference side Luton Town. The Italians overcame their English counterparts 2–0 with one goal coming in each half to record their first win on British soil in 18 years.

Next up was the first of two clashes against Premier League outfits on 6 August, as Parma met Norwich City at Carrow Road. The Canaries took a first-half lead through a close-range Grant Holt effort and led by that single goal at half-time. Andrew Surman then scored a second-half brace and Norwich ran out comfortable 3–0 winners. I Ducali then made the trip west to face West Bromwich Albion to round up the tour the following day and had more success. Nicola Sansone gave Parma the lead just before half-time, but a Somen Tchoyi goal deep into injury time in the second half secured the hosts a draw.

==== Return to Italy ====
Parma then returned home to Italy and hosted La Liga side Levante at the Tardini following the annual presentation of the players to the fans on 12 August. Graziano Pellè's only goal of the game meant the home fans went home happy as Parma geared up for the new season. Six days later, a triangular tournament was contested in Salsomaggiore Terme (in the Province of Parma) between Parma and lower league sides Salsomaggiore and Fidenza Calcio with each match lasting only 45 minutes; Parma won both matches, beating Fidenza 1–0 and Salsomaggiore 3–0. Parma's final warm-up before the new season was supposed to be two matches on 25 August against the club's Allievi Nazionali (which was just a single-half affair) and local side Pro Desenzano (which the club both won comfortably by seven goals to nil and six goals to three, respectively), but the delayed start of Serie A due to a players' strike meant a friendly was played on Saturday 27 August against Carpenedolo; Parma won 7–0. Parma also played Mantova and Crociati Noceto in September to give fringe players more game time, winning both matches comfortably to nil.

=== Serie A ===
Fixtures for the 2011–12 Serie A season were drawn in Milan on 27 July 2011 and made public the next day. Parma's league campaign was set to get underway on the weekend of 28 August 2011 against Catania in a repeat of the start of Parma's 2006–07 Serie A season, which ended two apiece, while the second match was to be away to Juventus. However, the opening weekend fixtures were delayed due to a players' strike over a new Serie A collective bargaining agreement between clubs and players, which was to include a super-tax on the league's highest earners and would compel unwanted players to train with the first team of their contracted club. An emergency one-year deal – as opposed to the normal three-year arrangements – was signed in the week leading up to the second week of matches, meaning Parma would start their campaign in Turin against Juventus.

Parma travelled to Juventus to become Old Lady's first competitive opponents in the brand new Juventus Stadium on 11 September and hoping to win a fourth consecutive match against the Turin side. However, Juventus scored early on through a tidy Stephan Lichtsteiner finish off a delightful Andrea Pirlo pass. This reflected the balance of play and Juventus were unlucky to have Alessandro Matri's effort ruled out just before half-time. Simone Pepe finally doubled the lead on 57 minutes with an accomplished finish, having been put through by Alessandro Del Piero. The chances continued to flow and debutant Arturo Vidal scored a fine volley from the edge of the box to make it 3–0 with quarter of an hour to go. Pirlo found Claudio Marchisio with ten minutes to go and Marchisio chipped Parma goalkeeper Antonio Mirante to complete Juventus' scoring. A late Sebastian Giovinco run saw him fouled in the box and score the resulting penalty, leaving Parma ahead of only Atalanta who were deducted six points before the season's start. Juventus had emphatically ended Parma's 18-match unbeaten record in season openers with a 4–1 win, the Ducali losing for the first time since 1992, when they succumbed to Atalanta.

On 18 September, Parma hosted former manager Domenico Di Carlo's Chievo at the Tardini with an unchanged line-up and were the better side for much of the first half and saw their dominance rewarded with a Giovinco goal with 24 minutes on the clock from a headed Pellè flick-on. The second half was, however, Chievo's, the majority of the action coming in Antonio Mirante's goalmouth, although chances were still at a premium. Chievo made their improved performance count through ex-Parma frontman Alberto Paloschi with 12 minutes to go and a draw looked the fair result, but a late Giovinco finish from substitute Jonathan Biabiany's inch-perfect whipped cross saw Parma snatch all three points and Giovinco become the first player since Adriano in 2003–04 to score 3 goals in the first two matches. Two-goal Giovinco was then sent off in injury time after he was shown a second yellow card for kicking the ball into the net following the referee's decision to penalise the diminutive Italian. The result represented a fifth consecutive victory at home for Parma – a feat last achieved in 2000–01 – after victories over Juventus, Palermo and Inter Milan last season and Grosseto this.

Three days later, Parma played away at Fiorentina, who had also won one and lost one of their first two league games. With Valiani and Pellè both missing due to injury and Giovinco serving his one-match suspension, four changes were made from the weekend's winning team, as both Abderrazzak Jadid and Zé Eduardo were given their first starts in a Parma shirt. Fiorentina made the only chances of the first half, but were largely restricted to long-range efforts. Before 30 seconds had passed in the second half, Fiorentina took a deserved lead from a close-range Stevan Jovetić tap-in after Alessandro Lucarelli failed to clear the ball. Alessio Cerci then doubled La Viola's lead with a diving header halfway through the second half, before Jovetić coolly added a third with ten minutes to go. The match finished 3–0.

On 26 September, Parma hosted Luis Enrique's Roma with Colomba's team needing a draw to stay out of the relegation zone. The game was one of few chances and a clash of styles between Roma's tiki-taka and the home side's counter-attacking football. Only Antonio Mirante's shakiness in the Parma goal from long shots appeared to be a route to goal in the first half, but the side from the capital struck early in the second half through a well-placed Dani Osvaldo header. Although Parma had more chances as the game went on, Osvaldo's effort was the only goal of the game, leaving Parma with 13 consecutive winless games against Roma.

The following week, Genoa came to Parma led by ex-Parma manager Alberto Malesani as Parma looked to put an end to their indifferent early season form and Genoa went in search of a second win at the Tardini on their twentieth visit. They were able to make their good start to the first half pay with a goal from a delightful Giovinco lob on the half-hour mark after a neat Sergio Floccari assist. As the first half drew to a close, Giovinco's mazy dribble was then illegally halted in the penalty area by Juraj Kucka and Parma were awarded a penalty; Giovinco himself converted the resultant spot kick. As Genoa threw more men forward, the chances continued to come for Parma and a fine counter-attack ended with a Stefano Morrone finish from inches out after he had somehow conspired to hit the bar from 6 yards out. The gloss of a fine victory was taken off when Genoa themselves were awarded a penalty for a Gabriel Paletta tug on Rodrigo Palacio in the last minute and the Argentine got up to score the penalty and round off the scoring at 3–1. This lifted Parma out of the relegation zone and Giovinco to the top of the scoring charts, alongside fellow 5-goal frontman Rodrigo Palacio.

After an international break which saw Sebastian Giovinco further cement his place in Italy coach Cesare Prandelli's plans for Euro 2012 the following summer, Parma travelled to Champions League side Napoli, who had beaten giants Inter Milan in their previous game by three goals to nil. Napoli had much of the ball in the early stages, but failed to make the most of their control of the ball, while Parma looked dangerous on the counter. This pattern continued into the second half before a Massimo Gobbi goal give Parma an unexpected lead just before an hour had passed. The left-back surged forward through Napoli's pedestrian midfield and laid the ball off to Sergio Floccari, who flicked the ball back into Gobbi's path, allowing Gobbi to slot home from point blank range. Napoli continued to press and eventually found an equaliser in a similar fashion to Parma's opener, Ezequiel Lavezzi supplying the backheel flick and playing the one-two with substitute Giuseppe Mascara. The sides were level for five minutes before Parma once again proved to have the more clinical instinct in front of goal. Francesco Valiani worked the ball out wide to Giovinco, who found Francesco Modesto sliding in at the back post to give Parma a 2–1 in the 82nd minute to momentarily put Parma seventh.

Parma followed their upset in Naples with a game at home to Serie A new boys Atalanta. Ex-Atalanta hitman Sergio Floccari, who was impressive against Napoli, left the field in the 8th minute, but Parma still had the better of the first-half chances. However, it was Atalanta that broke the deadlock, taking advantage of some dozy Parma defending that left Maximiliano Moralez free at the back post with what was almost an open goal in the 55th minute. Just three minutes later, Moralez scored a second, squeezing a loose ball into the goal at Antonio Mirante's near post. Jaime Valdés – making his 300th appearance in Italian league football – then reduced the arrears with ten minutes to go, neatly finishing from Massimo Gobbi square ball from the left. Valdés' goal turned out to be consolatory and Parma slid to 14th position in the league.

Parma's next task was a trip to face Milan, a game in which I Crociati had had little success in recent years. It was a trend that showed no signs of stopping as two first-half Antonio Nocerino strikes in as many minutes put Milan in control on the half-hour mark, as Parma started with no recognised striker. Things got worse with around quarter of an hour to go in the second half as Milan took a three-goal lead – Zlatan Ibrahimović the scorer. Sebastian Giovinco looked to have salvaged some pride for Parma, as he netted from a tight angle after a Jonathan Biabiany pass, scoring his sixth league goal of the season – more than anyone else in the league, except Udinese's Antonio Di Natale who had also netted six times in eight rounds. An injury time Nocerino goal saw the Italian midfielder seal his hat-trick and a comfortable 4–1 victory for the Milanese giants.

The club finished October hosting rock-bottom Cesena at home, but it was Parma themselves who now had the worst defensive record in the league. Parma had the better of the first half, particularly in the opening stages, and they won a penalty after Giovinco was felled by Alejandro Rodríguez, although it was unclear whether the Parma player was in or outside the box when the foul was made. The argument was ultimately academic because Giovinco's centrally-placed penalty was saved by Francesco Antonioli in the Cesena goal. Six minutes later and just before half-time, Gabriel Paletta scored his first Serie A goal after some footballing pinball saw it fall to the Argentine, who slotted it home from close range. More chances for the hosts followed in the second period and Alessandro Lucarelli made the game safe after a Cristian Zaccardo flick-on found him free at the back post. This was Parma's first clean sheet of the season, finally managing the feat at the tenth attempt.

Parma's next task was a trip to the country's capital to face high-flying Lazio, who found themselves in third place after nine games. Despite their good start, Lazio had looked inconsistent at home, winning just once at the Stadio Olimpico. In the first half, there were chances at both ends, but Parma's chances of victory were dealt a blow when Sebastian Giovinco, the club's top scorer and talisman, was forced off the pitch by an injury just after half-time. The game remained goalless until late in the game. A Miroslav Klose run ended with a cut-back to teammate Libor Kozák, whose shot was cleared off the line by Cristian Zaccardo, but that only left Giuseppe Sculli an easy tap-in to give Lazio the victory after 84 minutes.

Following the international break, 20 November 2011 saw Parma welcome league leaders Udinese to the Tardini. Udinese travelled without a win in five years at Parma's ground and came the closer to opening the scoring in the first half, but neither side was able to break the deadlock. In the second half, pacey wingman Jonathan Biabiany headed in from a Giovinco corner to give Parma a lead with just over half an hour to go. Fifteen minutes later, Dušan Basta was adjudged to have fouled Biabiany in the penalty area and Giovinco stepped up to convert the penalty from 12 yards out to give Parma a remarkable two-goal victory and lift them out of the bottom half of the table.

Next, Parma travelled to relegation-threatened Novara, where they had never won in fifteen previous attempts. Parma had the better of the first half and perhaps should have twice opened the scoring earlier than they did through Graziano Pellè, but the goal did come on the half-hour mark when Biabiany slid the ball across the area to find Novara defender Matteo Centurioni, who put the ball his own net. Novara then came into the game and were rewarded after 70 minutes, when Raffaele Rubino scored a typical header from close range to become the first player to score goals in the top 4 levels of Italian football at the same club. Novara then doubled Parma's pain 8 minutes later with a Marco Rigoni header. A late Giuseppe Gemiti sending-off and a 200th Parma appearance for Hernán Crespo were not enough to give Parma a way back into the game, as Novara won their first match in nine.

Following a disappointing mid-week exit from the Coppa Italia, islanders Palermo visited the Tardini, having failed to score in each of their previous six away league games. Parma had the better of much of the first half with Giovinco looking a threat and going close on a couple of occasions, but Palermo came back strongly at the beginning of second half. However, as the second half wore on, Parma again looked the better of the two teams, but neither side were able to get the decisive goal and the match ended goalless. This was Parma's first draw of the season, having been the only side in the league without one and the first draw at the Tardini since February after twelve consecutive games without a draw at the Ducali's home ground.

The following weekend, Parma travelled off the mainland to Sardinia to play Cagliari. For the second week in a row, Parma played out a goalless draw with few moments of note. Not even the return from injury of loanee Sergio Floccari could spark a Parma revival, but another man returning from injury, Francesco Modesto, did come off the bench to make his 300th career appearance, while club captain Stefano Morrone made his 150th league appearance for the club. Sebastian Giovinco and Cristian Zaccardo both went off with injuries during the match.

On 18 December, Parma hosted Lecce in a match that was set to be the last before Christmas break, but the re-organised Matchday 1 game was now to be played during the week that followed. Jonathan Biabiany's 18th minute run into the box was halted unfairly by the Lecce defence, leading to a chance from the spot for Sergio Floccari who duly converted to bag his first goal for the club. Just before the hour mark, David Di Michele scored from short range to level the scores, before scoring a magnificent second with a spectacular bicycle kick from the edge of the penalty area three minutes later. Juan Cuadrado then scored Lecce's third with 13 minutes left in the game with a fine left-footed effort blasted past Antonio Mirante, who was making his 200th professional appearance, as Parma looked down the barrel at another game without a win. A goalkeeping error three minutes from full-time allowed Graziano Pellè to reduce the deficit, his first goal for the club. Deep into injury time, the ball fell to Daniele Galloppa following a poorly cleared corner and he rifled it him to salvage a third consecutive draw for the Ducali.

Three days later, Parma welcomed Catania to the Tardini. Parma started the game in the perfect fashion, opening the scoring after five minutes through a Francesco Modesto header off a deep cross, but Catania hit back after 21 minutes through a scrappy penalty area scramble that ended in a neat yet simple finish for Sergio Bernardo Almirón. Parity was soon gone when Sebastian Giovinco's pass found Jonathan Biabiany on the edge of the penalty area two minutes later; the Frenchman finished emphatically. On the stroke of half-time, Sergio Floccari doubled Parma's leader after a fine run and an exchange of passes with Giovinco allowed him to finish impressively. However, a Catania penalty 17 minutes from the match's end brought the islanders right back into the game; Fabiano Santacroce was the offending defender and Francesco Lodi stepped up to convert to halve the deficit. The scoring was not finished and Andrea Catellani's close-range volley consigned Parma to a fourth consecutive draw in a familiar second-half slump performance.

After the traditional Christmas break, Parma travelled to underachieving Inter Milan who were led by ex-Parma boss Claudio Ranieri and who had not lost the first match back from the break in their 12 openers since 1999, when they were beaten by Parma. That trend never looked like being broken as Inter cruised past a hapless Parma side, as the pressure mounted on Franco Colomba, who led the Emaliani to a sixth game without a win. Diego Milito opened the scoring after 13 minutes and grabbed a second 4 minutes before the break, after Thiago Motta had doubled the lead on 18 minutes. Their lead grew to 4 after the break as Giampaolo Pazzini got involved, before novice right-back Marco Faraoni scored a spectacular fifth late on. This result led to the sacking of Franco Colomba on 9 January 2012; he was replaced by Roberto Donadoni.

Donadoni's first game at the helm was at home against Siena. Donadoni adopted a 3–4–3 formation, which meant Francesco Modesto dropped to the bench to make room for Massimo Gobbi and Francesco Valiani on the flanks. The suspended Daniele Galloppa made way for Gianluca Musacci, who was yet to start a game for Parma, while veteran Nicola Pavarini stepped in for the injured Antonio Mirante. At the midpoint of the first half, Parma took the lead. Giovinco crossed the ball in from the right, finding Gobbi, who headed the ball back into the centre to find Jonathan Biabiany and Stefano Morrone stretching to fire in from close range; Biabiany got the final touch. stunning Pavarini double save kept Parma in the lead after 35 minutes. Parma doubled their lead through a finely placed Valiani header from Giovinco's left-wing cross. With ten minutes to go, Siena grabbed a lifeline through Paolo Grossi's outstanding long-range strike, but Giovinco finished from close range in injury time after a Raffaele Palladino square ball to make it 3–1. It was the Italian international's first goal in 2 months, but his 8th league goal of the season.

Donadoni's first game at the helm was at home against Siena. Donadoni adopted a 3–4–3 formation, which meant Francesco Modesto dropped to the bench to make room for Massimo Gobbi and Francesco Valiani on the flanks. The suspended Daniele Galloppa made way for Gianluca Musacci, who was yet to start a game for Parma, while veteran Nicola Pavarini stepped in for the injured Antonio Mirante. At the midpoint of the first half, Parma took the lead. Giovinco crossed the ball in from the right, finding Gobbi, who headed the ball back into the centre to find Jonathan Biabiany and Stefano Morrone stretching to fire in from close range; Biabiany got the final touch. A stunning Pavarini double save kept Parma in the lead after 35 minutes. Parma doubled their lead through a finely placed Valiani header from Giovinco's left-wing cross. With ten minutes to go, Siena grabbed a lifeline through Paolo Grossi's outstanding long-range strike, but Giovinco finished from close range in injury time after a Raffaele Palladino square ball to make it 3–1. It was the Italian international's first goal in 2 months, but his 8th league goal of the season.

Next up was the Derby d'Emilia away to Bologna. Daniele Galloppa returned from suspension, but goalkeeper Mirante was still sidelined through injury as Donadoni took charge of his second match. Despite the number one's absence, Parma's goal was again well guarded thanks to Nicola Pavarini, who made a couple of fine saves, including one against former Parma man Marco Di Vaio. The second half proved a feisty affair, typical of a derby, as the game petered out into a goalless draw.

The following Saturday on 28 January, Parma travelled to Catania, whom they had played the previous month due to an early season fixture cancellation. The suspended Cristian Zaccardo sat things out from the sidelines, while new signings Jonathan and Stefano Okaka both made their debuts off the bench. Both sides had good chances early on, but it was Catania's Gonzalo Bergessio who opened the scoring, dribbling around Nicola Pavarini in the Parma goal. Parma managed to equalise just before half-time through Francesco Modesto, who capitalised on a failed defensive clearance by finishing with a scuffed effort. The match ended one apiece, as Parma chalked up a sixth draw in eight games, having not drawn any of the first twelve.

Parma's next engagement was set to be the hosting of Juventus at the Tardini on 31 January, but it was called off after heavy snowfall. The match was rescheduled for 15 February. It was the first time a game at the Tardini had been called off in exactly two years, when Inter Milan visited. The mid-week postponement gave Parma extra rest before their third consecutive away match on a Sunday against Chievo, who had played on Thursday night. Both sides had two good chances in the first half, but it was Parma who took the lead, shortly after the break when the returning and freshly signed McDonald Mariga's chipped ball was expertly controlled by Giovinco, who proceeded to finish emphatically. However, the lead was short-lived: Modesto's poor defending allowed Cyril Théréau to finish easily from six yards. Parma had the better of the game after Chievo's equaliser and saw a couple of efforts saved, before a wide Giovinco free-kick was inadvertently sliced home by Chievo's Luciano to give Parma the victory.

On the second weekend of February, heavy snow interrupted a second consecutive Parma home game, as the Crociati's Sunday meeting with Fiorentina was called off on the Saturday after a Friday blizzard and re-arranged for Wednesday 7 March. On 15 February, Parma faced Juventus in the rearranged 31 January meeting with the Old Lady on an unbeaten run of 25 competitive matches. They had last lost in the Tardini against Parma on 15 May 2011. Parma had Gabriel Paletta and Daniele Galloppa missing through injury and Juventus adopted the 3–5–2 formation that Parma had employed in recent games with January signing Stefano Ferrario making his debut. An early Giorgio Chiellini header hit the bar and it set the tone for the first half, as the Italian international's team dominated the chances, but failed to score. Parma came into it in the second half and Sebastian Giovinco had opportunities to give them the lead. Both sides had dubious penalty appeals turned down and usual second choice goalkeeper Nicola Pavarini continued his good form in goal. Recently departed Hernán Crespo had said an emotional goodbye to the fans before the match.

On 19 February, Parma travelled to Roma's Stadio Olimpico to take on Luis Enrique's charges in a stadium where they had beaten Roma just once in 22 attempts. Raffaele Palladino was surprisingly selected to partner Sebastian Giovinco in Parma's front two and the decision paid dividends through two early forays into Roma territory. Roma then began to gain the upper hand and had two penalty appeals turned down and finally made their dominance pay through Fabio Borini, co-owned by Parma, who finished well past Mirante. Stefano Okaka, on loan from Roma to Parma, then replaced the injured Palladino just before half-time. Roma had by far the better of the first half, but had made just one chance. In the second half, Parma had more of the ball in Roma's half, but Roma had numerous attempts on goal and the 1–0 defeat, the first of Donadoni's reign, could have been heavier.

Parma opened the last Serie A weekend of February away to Genoa, who were led by Pasquale Marino, the coach who took charge of much of Parma's 2010–11 season. With neither side having scored since 5 February, it was a surprise when the scoring was opened so easily in the game; Massimo Gobbi swept home from the edge of the area after just five minutes. Giovinco then had what looked like a fair goal ruled out for offside just before half-time. Parma did get their second goal after the break after a brilliant run from Jonathan Biabiany ended in a Giovinco chance with the follow-up falling to Sergio Floccari, who converted against his former employees. With just over ten minutes to go, Genoa were very fortunate to be given a penalty for Francesco Modesto's accidental handball inside the area; Rodrigo Palacio tapped in after Mirante's save. Genoa then should have had a penalty after a reckless Modesto challenged went unpunished. The referee inexplicably allowed 7 minutes of injury time; Palacio used the sixth to break the offside trap and slot home to level the score and earn a point for his team.

A rare lunchtime kick-off was the scene of Napoli's visit to the Tardini, just the second home game the Crociati had had in a run of seven. Napoli had won four in a row before this game, but they were dominated by an impressive Parma performance. Gianluca Musacci, however, appear to have tripped Edinson Cavani in the penalty area late on in the second half, although replays suggested that Cavani tripped over his feet. He picked himself up to take the penalty, had it saved by Mirante, but was quickest to react to poke it home to give Napoli the lead. The parallels with last week's penalty against Genoa were strong: the referee's decision was questionable and Mirante saved, but could only push it into the taker's path. Parma continued to dominate in the second half and should have had a penalty for an Andrea Dossena handball, but eventually scored through Cristian Zaccardo's tap-in with not long left to go. As Parma pressed for the winner, Napoli broke and Ezequiel Lavezzi scored, although replays suggest he was offside.

A pre-match protest in the Curva Nord at the refereeing performances in Parma matches was the prelude to Fiorentina's re-arranged visit on Wednesday 7 March. Parma started well and dominated the game with the surprising inclusion of Jaime Valdés in central midfield not hindering them. After 28 minutes, Giovinco played through ball ahead of Stefano Okaka, whose shot was saved, but the Italian striker finished well on the rebound. On the hour mark, Fiorentina equalised after an excellent wide free-kick found Matija Nastasić, who nodded home from close range. Parma continued to have chances, but Fiorentina miraculously took the lead via a cute Alessio Cerci finish. Late on, Giovinco won a contentious penalty for a shirt tag and stepped up to score the penalty to level the scores at two each. Confusion reigned late on; it looked as though Valon Behrami had been sent off, but the red card was rescinded after discussions between the referee and the linesman. Andrea Lazzari should have won the game for Fiorentina in injury time, but fired just wide.

On 11 March, Parma were hosted by Atalanta, a side on a high during a fine return to Serie A. Before the match, there were the beginnings of relegation fears for, who had picked up only three points from five games and were just five points clear of the relegation zone. Atalanta were without a host of players and Parma were still missing Gobbi and Palladino, while Galloppa and Mirante had also picked up injuries. Atalanta took the lead early on with a Thomas Manfredini overhead kick after Gabriel Paletta failed to clear. Giovinco had chances from dead ball situations before half-time, but it was the home team that were in front at the break. The lead was wiped out ten minutes into the second half after a Valdés cross from the left-hand side was nodded home precisely by Paletta. The game ended 1–1, despite a late siege from Atalanta.

Parma's next engagement was the weekend opener against league leaders Milan in front of a crowd approaching 20,000. The away side had a host of absentees, including Robinho, Mark van Bommel, Ignazio Abate, Kevin-Prince Boateng and Alessandro Nesta, while Parma were still without Galloppa, although Mirante returned in goal. Early on, Giovinco was lively, incorrectly offside in a good position, before blasting over following a Christian Abbiati error, but it was Milan that opened the scoring after winning a penalty when Cristian Zaccardo inexplicably raised his arm to block Urby Emanuelson’s half-volley shot. Zlatan Ibrahimović scored the penalty after 17 minutes. Parma continued to press and look Milan's equal before and after half-time, but Emanuelson doubled Milan's advantage after his fantastic dribble ended with an easy finish beyond the rounded Mirante. Undeterred, Parma looked for a consolation goal, but it was not forthcoming, which left the Ducali without a win in seven.

The Ducali saw March's last full complement of fixtures out with a trip to virtually relegated Cesena, who were 14 points adrift of safety (Parma) prior to kick off with just ten games remaining. Parma had not won in seven, but the home side's run without a win was ten. Both runs went on longer in a match that was full of chances. Parma's Sergio Floccari opened the scoring just before half-time with a neat and powerful finish after Giovinco's square ball, but both sides could have had any number of goals before the halfway point. The second half started in disastrous fashion for the away side; Cesena took the lead with goals from Mario Santana and Simone Del Nero in the first ten minutes. Paletta's header just after the hour brought the scores level. Chances continued to flow, but the game ended 2–2. This preserved Parma's 5-point buffer from relegation because nineteenth-placed Novara played out a goalless draw with eighteenth-placed Lecce.

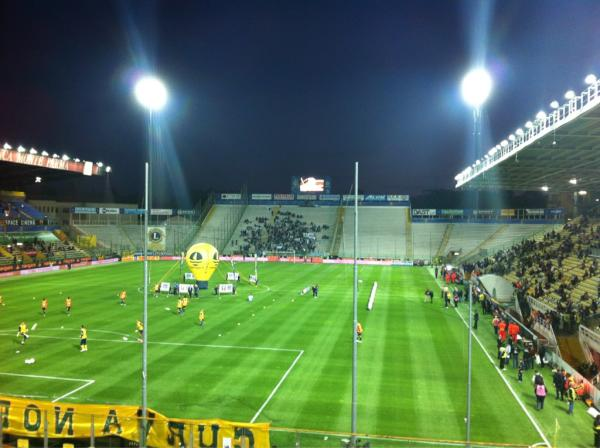
Parma hosted Lazio in late March and both sides had something to play for, albeit at opposite ends of the table.

On 31 March, Parma faced Champions League spot-chasing Lazio, who had a hit a run of bad form. Parma's Cristian Zaccardo made his 100th appearance for the club. Parma took the lead early on with the first chance when McDonald Mariga capitalised on Federico Marchetti's goalkeeping error to hit home from nine yards. Sergio Floccari, on loan from Lazio, doubled the lead with an easy header after a Gabriel Paletta miscue. Parma remained on top, but both sides had further chances before Lazio pegged one back before half-time through Lionel Scaloni. Play was briefly suspended midway through the second half after a floodlight failure at the Tardini and Lazio might have equalised soon after the restart. Floccari completed a brace with 18 minutes to go with a fine volley off Giovinco's free-kick. This put Parma 8 points clear of the relegation zone, although eighteenth-placed Lecce did have a game in hand.

On Holy Saturday, Parma travelled to Udinese to face ex-employee Francesco Guidolin's charges. Udinese started the game well, but the first half was an even affair. Udinese might have had a man sent off when Giovinco was fouled when through on goal, but Roberto Pereyra was only booked. Udinese took the lead on the stroke of half-time with a calm finish from Kwadwo Asamoah. Antonio Di Natale doubled the lead just before the hour mark, but it was Parma who continued to press. The away side's reward eventually came from a corner and captain Alessandro Lucarelli's calm finish from close range. As Parma looked for an equaliser, Udinese broke and Asamoah sealed victory with his second goal of the afternoon. Unlikely victories for Lecce against Roma and Fiorentina against Milan meant Parma were dragged back into the relegation fight.

With defensive leader Paletta suspended, Parma's second task in 4 days was the visit of Novara, whose relegation was all but confirmed. Parma started the game brightly and the pressure eventually paid when Parma's counter ended with a simple Giovinco finish. Jonathan doubled the home side's lead before half-time with a close-range effort. Novara were then awarded a questionable penalty in the second half when Taka Morimoto under pressure from Fabiano Santacroce, but Antonio Mirante saved the spot kick.

After the previous weekend's fixtures were cancelled following the on-pitch death of Piermario Morosini, Parma faced Cagliari in the early evening on 21 April 2012. Both sides had 38 points after 32 games prior to the game, four clear of Lecce in 18th. Both sides had chances before Sebastian Giovinco opened the scoring through a free-kick deflected off Francesco Pisano halfway through the first half. Little action followed before the break, but Parma were awarded a penalty after 73 minutes when Jonathan was tripped in the area; Sergio Floccari converted the penalty. Parma scored a third via a late Stefano Okaka penalty.

The fixtures postponed due to Piermario Morosini's death were played mid-week in the last full week of April and Parma were up against a tricky trip to Sicily to play Palermo. Abel Hernández got the first goal with a header at the back post after he was found by Andrea Mantovani in the sixth minute. Palermo had the better of the first half and deserved their lead, but it was Parma who started the second half better and Giovinco's fine run and shot was parried into Stefano Okaka's path and the striker made no mistake to level with his head. With 20 minutes to go, Giovinco again did some good work and then found Jonathan Biabiany free in the area. The Frenchman steered the ball into the Palermo net to give the away side the lead. This left Parma 9 points clear of relegation with 4 games to go.

Four days later, Parma travelled to Lecce, knowing a win at the weekend against Lecce would mathematically ensure safety. With Zaccardo not fit, Rolf Feltscher was afforded a rare start for the away side and Lecce had the better of the early stages before Parma came back into it and deserved the lead they took halfway through the second half. It was top scorer Giovinco who found the net with an excellent free-kick. Lecce could have equalised before Parma doubled their lead with a composed finish from Gabriel Paletta who had sprung the offside trap. Nenad Tomović pulled one back with an accurate header late on and Lecce pressed well late on, but failed to get a point. Parma consolidated their place in 9th position.

Parma's next game was at home to Inter Milan on 2 May 2012. The away side were unbeaten under new coach Andrea Stramaccioni and chasing the final Champions League spot and took an early lead through Wesley Sneijder on the counter-attack after a positive Parma start. There were few chances for the rest of the first half, but Fernando Marqués soon after the break with an easy finish at the back post after Giovinco robbed Lúcio of the ball. Within a couple of minutes, Giovinco exploited a large space behind the Inter defenders and finished emphatically to give Parma the lead. The Milan side enjoyed pressure and might have equalised before Biabiany broke the offside trap for Parma, rounded Júlio César and scored to give the home side a merited 3–1 win and a fifth consecutive victory for the first time since 1999–2000.

The club's penultimate game of the season was against Siena, a game in which Parma needed three points to keep their faint hopes of European football alive and set a new club record for consecutive Serie A wins. The first half was tepid with neither side managing a shot on target, but opportunities were nonetheless to be had for both sides. The match continued in much the same manner in the second half until Sebastian Giovinco netted a spectacular volley from 25 metres out after 67 minutes. Parma got a second and sealed victory in injury time after Sergio Floccari took advantage of defensive sloppiness to roll the ball into an empty net.

On the final day of the season, Parma hosted Bologna in the Derby d'Emilia in a virtual shoot-out for eighth position. In a game of few chances, it was Jonathan Biabiany who got the only goal of the game with an atypical header from a Giovinco corner kick. Parma had the better of the second half chances, but the match ended with a single goal scored. This gave the home team a record seventh consecutive win in Serie A.

=== Coppa Italia ===
Parma will play their first cup match on around 21 August 2011, entering at the third round. The draw for the 2011–12 edition of the Coppa Italia was made on 27 July in Milan and Parma were drawn to play the winners of Serie B outfit Grosseto's clash against the winners of the tie between Lega Pro Prima Divisione sides Como and Prato at home. A 2–1 win for Prato over Como saw them progress to the second round, but the Tuscan side came unstuck the following week, succumbing 3–2 to Grosseto. Grosseto travelled to Parma for the tie on 21 August, but were soundly beaten 4–1. Parma could not break down a stubborn Grosseto outfit playing a defensive 4–5–1 until the stroke of half-time when Italian international and man of the match Sebastian Giovinco converted Francesco Valiani cross with scissor kick. Francesco Modesto on the other flank then delivered a cross for Graziano Pellè to see Parma double their lead with half an hour to go. Hernán Crespo then scored two goals in the last ten minutes as a substitute, his goals bisected by a Gabriel Paletta own goal, as Franco Colomba's 100% record at the Tardini remained intact and Parma completed their fourth victory in a row on home soil for the first time since April and May 2007 under Claudio Ranieri, although the team did fail to keep a clean sheet in a home Coppa Italia match on the twelfth consecutive occasion in a run which extended back to 10 May 2002 when they overcame Juventus 1–0.

Parma's next task would be to take on Grosseto's fellow Serie B side Verona, who had emerged victorious over Sassuolo on a penalty shoot-out after a 3–3. A much-changed Ducali side included club legend Hernán Crespo, who went in search of an 11th Coppa Italia goal for the club that would bring him level with all-time top scorer Alessandro Melli, while Verona sought a first appearance in the last 16 since 1996–97 after six consecutive Serie B victories. The second tier side were successful in realising that first appearance in fifteen years with a goal in either half against a poor Parma side.

== Pre-season and friendlies ==
16 July 2011 Friendly	Levico (Italy)	1 – 7	(Italy) Parma	Levico Terme
	Prela 70'		11', 19' Giovinco; 32' Crespo; 44' Zaccardo; 54' Galloppa; 63' Borini; 69'Pellè	Attendance: 500 approx.

17 July 2011 Friendly	Trentino Representative XI (Italy)	0 – 6	(Italy) Parma	Levico Terme
			Paonessa 17', 20'; Biabiany 33', 35'; Sansone 66', 81'

20 July 2011 Friendly	Parma (Italy)	0 – 0	(Czech Republic) Slavia Prague	Levico Terme
		Report		Attendance: 900 approx.

23 July 2011 Friendly	Parma (Italy)	3 – 0	(Bulgaria) Ludogorets Razgrad	Levico Terme
	Zaccardo 45'; Borini 62'; Giovinco 71'

24 July 2011 Friendly	Cogollo (Italy)	1 – 10	(Italy) Parma	Levico Terme
	Peretto 45' (pen.)		6' Galloppa; 29' Crespo; 32', 40', 51' Giovinco; 43' Paonessa; 59' Palladino; 73' Sansone; 75', 77' Pellè	Attendance: 1,000 approx.

30 July 2011 Friendly	Cardiff City (Wales)	0 – 0	(Italy) Parma	Cardiff City Stadium, Cardiff

2 August 2011 Friendly	Luton Town (England)	0 – 2	(Italy) Parma	Kenilworth Road, Luton
			10' Biabiany; 53' Borini	Attendance: 3,173

6 August 2011 Friendly	Norwich City (England)	3 – 0	(Italy) Parma	Carrow Road, Norwich
	Holt 34'; Surman 64', 86'

7 August 2011 Friendly	West Bromwich Albion (England)	1 – 1	(Italy) Parma	The Hawthorns, West Bromwich
	Tchoyi 90+2'		43' Sansone	Attendance: 6,068; Referee: Stuart Atwell

12 August 2011 Friendly	Parma (Italy)	1 – 0	(Spain) Levante	Stadio Ennio Tardini, Parma
	Pellè 30'			Attendance: 2,245

18 August 2011 45-minute friendly	Fidenza (Italy)	0 – 1	(Italy) Parma
			44' Valiani

18 August 2011 45-minute friendly	Salsomaggiore (Italy)	0 – 3	(Italy) Parma
			10', 20' Crespo; 41' Borini

25 August 2010 45-minute friendly	Parma Allievi Nazionali (Italy)	0 – 6	(Italy) Parma	Collecchio
			6', 24', 37' Pellè; 13' Valiani; 20', 44' Giovinco

25 August 2011 Friendly	Parma (Italy)	6 – 3	(Italy) Pro Desenzano
	Biabiany 19'; Crespo 22', 24'; Sansone 28'; Zé Eduardo 37'; Jadid 88'	Report	60' Fogliata; 66' Coppiardi; 72' Maspero

27 August 2011 Friendly	Carpenedolo (Italy)	0 – 7	(Italy) Parma
			17' Crespo; 19', 25', 35' Pellè; 6', 26' (pen.) Giovinco; 36' Modesto	Attendance: 400 approx.

15 September 2011 Friendly	Mantova (Italy)	0 – 3	(Italy) Parma
		Report	14' Jadid; 19' Feltscher; 26' Crespo	Attendance: 700 approx.

29 September 2011 Friendly	Parma (Italy)	5 – 0	(Italy) Crociati Noceto
	Valdés 31'; Pellè 41'; Floccari 63', 68'; Giovinco 74'	Report		Attendance: 700 approx.

6 October 2011 Friendly	Parma (Italy)	1 – 0	(Italy) Viareggio	Pietrasanta
18:00	Pellè 31'	Report		Attendance: 200 approx. Referee: Niccolò Baroni

12 November 2011 Friendly	Parma (Italy)	1 – 0	Ghana U20	Stadio Ennio Tardini
	Crespo 76'	Report		Attendance: 900; Referee: Luigi Rossi

== Competitions ==
=== Serie A ===
==== League table ====
Pos	Team	Pld	W	D	L	GF	GA	GD	Pts	Qualification or relegation
6	Internazionale	38	17	7	14	58	55	+3	58	Qualification to Europa League third qualifying round (Note: Napoli qualified to the group stage of the Europa League as winner of the 2011–12 Coppa Italia. As they finished fifth, the sixth-placed team of the league also qualified for the Europa League.)
7	Roma	38	16	8	14	60	54	+6	56 (Note: Roma finished ahead of Parma on head–to–head away goals scored: Parma 0–1 Roma, Roma 1–0 Parma.)	
8	Parma	38	15	11	12	54	53	+1	56	
9	Bologna	38	13	12	13	41	43	−2	51	
10	Chievo	38	12	13	13	35	45	−10	49	

Source: Lega Serie A
Rules for classification: 1) points; 2) head-to-head points; 3) head-to-head goal difference; 4) head-to-head goals scored; 5) goal difference; 6) number of goals scored

==== Results summary ====
Overall								Home						Away					
Pld	W	D	L	GF	GA	GD	Pts	W	D	L	GF	GA	GD	W	D	L	GF	GA	GD
38	15	11	12	54	53	+1	56	10	5	4	34	20	+14	5	6	8	20	33	−13

Last updated: 13 May 2012.
Source: Competitive matches

==== Results by round ====
Round	1	2	3	4	5	6	7	8	9	10	11	12	13	14	15	16	17	18	19	20	21	22	23	24	25	26	27	28	29	30	31	32	33	34	35	36	37	38
Ground	A	H	A	H	H	A	H	A	H	A	H	A	H	A	H	H	A	H	A	A	A	H	H	A	A	H	A	H	A	H	A	H	A	H	A	H	A	H
Result	L	W	L	L	W	W	L	L	W	L	W	L	D	D	D	D	L	W	D	D	W	D	L	D	L	D	D	L	D	W	L	W	W	W	W	W	W	W
Position	19	10	13	18	12	9	14	15	12	15	10	10	11	12	13	13	15	11	12	11	13	12	14	14	16	16	16	17	17	15	16	15	13	9	9	8	8	8

Updated to match(es) played on 13 May 2012. Source: Competitive matches
A = Away; H = Home; W = Win; D = Draw; L = Loss

==== Matches ====
11 September 2011 1	Juventus	4–1	Parma	Turin
12:30	Lichtsteiner 17'; Pepe 57'; Vidal 73'; Marchisio 82'	Report	90+2' (pen.) Giovinco	Stadium: Juventus Stadium; Attendance: 35,920; Referee: Domenico Celi

18 September 2011 2	Parma	2–1	Chievo	Parma
15:00	Giovinco 24', 90'	Report	78' Paloschi	Stadium: Stadio Ennio Tardini; Attendance: 11,189; Referee: Daniele Doveri

21 September 2011 3	Fiorentina	3–0	Parma	Florence
20:45	Jovetić 46', 80'; Cerci 61'	Report		Stadium: Stadio Artemio Franchi; Attendance: 20,436; Referee: Nicola Rizzoli

25 September 2011 4	Parma	0–1	Roma	Parma
20:45		Report	50' Osvaldo	Stadium: Stadio Ennio Tardini; Attendance: 12,882; Referee: Daniele Orsato

2 October 2011 5	Parma	3–1	Genoa	Parma
15:00	Giovinco 28', 42' (pen.); Morrone 50'	Report	90+2' (pen.) Palacio	Stadium: Stadio Ennio Tardini; Attendance: 12,747; Referee: Antonio Damato

15 October 2011 6	Napoli	1–2	Parma	Naples
20:45	Mascara 76'	Report	57' Gobbi; 82' Modesto	Stadium: Stadio San Paolo; Attendance: 41,042; Referee: Paolo Mazzoleni

23 October 2011 7	Parma	1–2	Atalanta	Parma
15:00	Valdés 80'	Report	55', 58' Moralez	Stadium: Stadio Ennio Tardini; Attendance: 13,003; Referee: Christian Brighi

26 October 2011 8	Milan	4–1	Parma	Milan
20:45	Nocerino 30', 32', 90'; Ibrahimović 73'	Report	78' Giovinco	Stadium: San Siro; Attendance: 35,753; Referee: Carmine Russo

30 October 2011 9	Parma	2–0	Cesena	Parma
15:00	Giovinco 35'; Paletta 41'; Lucarelli 74'	Report		Stadium: Stadio Ennio Tardini; Attendance: 12,480; Referee: Marco Guida

6 November 2011 10	Lazio	1–0	Parma	Rome
15:00	Sculli 84'	Report		Stadium: Stadio Olimpico; Attendance: 29,564; Referee: Andrea De Marco

20 November 2011 11	Parma	2–0	Udinese	Parma
20:45	Biabiany 58'; Giovinco 75' (pen.)	Report		Stadium: Stadio Ennio Tardini; Attendance: 14,239; Referee: Andrea Romeo

26 November 2011 12	Novara	2–1	Parma	Novara
18:00	Rubino 70'; Rigoni 78'	Report	29' (o.g.) Centurioni	Stadium: Stadio Silvio Piola; Attendance: 8,964; Referee: Dino Tommasi

4 December 2011 13	Parma	0–0	Palermo	Parma
20:45		Report		Stadium: Stadio Ennio Tardini; Attendance: 11,815; Referee: Luca Banti

10 December 2011 14	Cagliari	0–0	Parma	Cagliari
15:00		Report		Stadium: Stadio Sant'Elia; Referee: Christian Brighi

18 December 2011 15	Parma	3–3	Lecce	Parma
15:00	Floccari 18' (pen.); Pellè 86'; Galloppa 90'	Report	58', 61' Di Michele; 32' Cuadrado	Stadium: Stadio Ennio Tardini; Attendance: 12,161; Referee: Gabriele Gava

21 December 2011 16	Parma	3–3	Catania	Parma
20:45	Modesto 5'; Biabiany 23'; Floccari 44'	Report	21' Almirón; 73' Lodi; 85' Catellani	Stadium: Stadio Ennio Tardini; Attendance: 10,814; Referee: Davide Massa

7 January 2012 17	Inter Milan	5–0	Parma	Milan
20:45	Milito 13', 41'; Motta 18'; Pazzini 56'; Faraoni 79'			Stadium: San Siro; Attendance: 47,326; Referee: Antonio Danilo Giannoccaro

15 January 2012 18	Parma	3–1	Siena	Parma
15:00	Biabiany 23'; Valiani 66'; Giovinco 90+3'	Report	79' Grossi	Stadium: Stadio Ennio Tardini; Attendance: 11,628; Referee: Sebastiano Peruzzo

22 January 2012 19	Bologna	0–0	Parma	Bologna
12:30		Report		Stadium: Stadio Renato Dall'Ara; Attendance: 15,141; Referee: Mauro Bergonzi

28 January 2012 20	Catania	1–1	Parma	Catania
18:00	Bergessio 33'	Report	43' Modesto	Stadium: Stadio Angelo Massimino; Attendance: 13,098; Referee: Daniele Doveri

5 February 2012 22	Chievo	1–2	Parma	Verona
15:00	Théréau 50'	Report	46' Giovinco; 69' (o.g.) Luciano	Stadium: Stadio Marc'Antonio Bentegodi; Attendance: 7,500; Referee: Luigi Nasca

15 February 2012 21	Parma	0–0	Juventus	Parma
18:30		Report		Stadium: Stadio Ennio Tardini; Attendance: 17,200; Referee: Paolo Mazzoleni

19 February 2012 24	Roma	1–0	Parma	Rome
20:45	Borini 26'	Report		Stadium: Stadio Olimpico; Attendance: 29,433; Referee: Sebastiano Peruzzo

25 February 2012 25	Genoa	2–2	Parma	Genoa
18:00	79', 90+6' Palacio	Report	Gobbi 6'; Floccari 52'	Stadium: Stadio Luigi Ferraris; Attendance: 19,223; Referee: Andrea Romeo

4 March 2012 26	Parma	1–2	Napoli	Parma
12:30	Zaccardo 76'	Report	40' (pen.) Cavani; 85' Lavezzi	Stadium: Stadio Ennio Tardini; Attendance: 16,416; Referee: Paolo Valeri

7 March 2012 27	Parma	2–2	Fiorentina	Parma
18:30	Okaka 28'; Giovinco 87' (pen.)	Report	60' Nastasić; 71' Cerci	Stadium: Stadio Ennio Tardini; Attendance: 12,979; Referee: Nicola Rizzoli

11 March 2012 28	Atalanta	1–1	Parma	Bergamo
15:00	Manfredini 5'	Report	55' Paletta	Stadium: Stadio Atleti Azzurri d'Italia; Attendance: 14,210; Referee: Andrea Gervasoni

17 March 2012 29	Parma	0–2	Milan	Parma
18:00		Report	17' (pen.) Ibrahimović; 54' Emanuelson	Stadium: Stadio Ennio Tardini; Attendance: 19,481; Referee: Luca Banti

25 March 2012 30	Cesena	2–2	Parma	Cesena
15:00	46' Santana; 53' Del Nero	[ Report]	Floccari 40'; Paletta 61'	Stadium: Stadio Dino Manuzzi; Referee: Domenico Celi

31 March 2012 31	Parma	3–1	Lazio	Parma
20:45	Mariga 5'; Floccari 11', 72'	Report	36' Scaloni	Stadium: Stadio Ennio Tardini; Attendance: 13,261; Referee: Antonio Danilo Giannoccaro

7 April 2012 32	Udinese	3–1	Parma	Udine
15:00	Asamoah 45', 90+2'; Di Natale 57'	Report	84' Lucarelli	Stadium: Stadio Friuli; Referee: Gabriele Gava

11 April 2012 33	Parma	2–0	Novara	Parma
20:45	Giovinco 25'; Jonathan 39'	Report		Stadium: Stadio Ennio Tardini; Attendance: 11,719; Referee: Paolo Tagliavento

21 April 2012 34	Parma	3–0	Cagliari	Parma
18:00	Giovinco 24'; Floccari 73' (pen.); Okaka 90' (pen.)	Report		Stadium: Stadio Ennio Tardini; Attendance: 14,433; Referee: Nicola Rizzoli

25 April 2012 33	Palermo	1–2	Parma	Palermo
15:00 CEST (UTC+02:00)	Hernández 6'; Aguirregaray (yellow card) 51'; Labrín (yellow card) 87'; Miccoli (yellow card) 90+5'	Report	Galloppa (yellow card) 34'; Okaka 55'; Biabiany 70'	Stadium: Stadio Renzo Barbera; Attendance: 14,365; Referee: Carmine Russo

29 April 2012 35	Lecce	1–2	Parma	Lecce
15:00 CEST (UTC+02:00)	Migliónico (yellow card) 42'; Esposito (yellow card) 73' (yellow-red card) 90+1'; Tomović 83'	Report	Feltscher (yellow card) 50'; Giovinco 67'; Gobbi (yellow card) 75'; Paletta 78'	Stadium: Stadio Via del Mare; Attendance: 10,293; Referee: Paolo Mazzoleni

2 May 2012 36	Parma	3–1	Inter Milan	Parma
20:45 CEST (UTC+02:00)	Marqués (yellow card) 33', (goal) 53'; Giovinco 55'; Valdés (yellow card) 65'; Biabiany 83'; Galloppa (yellow card) 87'	Report	Sneijder 13'; Obi (yellow card) 20'; Maicon (yellow card) 45+1'	Stadium: Stadio Ennio Tardini; Attendance: 14,817; Referee: Daniele Orsato

6 May 2012 37	Siena	0–2	Parma	Siena
12:30 CEST (UTC+02:00)	Terzi (yellow card) 18'; Contini (yellow card) 85'	Report	Giovinco 67'; Floccari 90+2'	Stadium: Stadio Artemio Franchi – Montepaschi Arena; Attendance: 8,644; Referee: Silvio Baratta

13 May 2012 38	Parma	1–0	Bologna	Parma
18:00 CEST (UTC+02:00)	Biabiany 37'; Valdés (yellow card) 41'; Galloppa (yellow card) 84'	Report	Di Vaio (yellow card) 50'; Belfodil (yellow card) 84'	Stadium: Stadio Ennio Tardini; Attendance: 16,922; Referee: Maurizio Ciampi

== Coppa Italia ==
21 August 2011 Third round	Parma	4–1	Grosseto	Parma
20:45 CEST (UTC+02:00)	Giovinco 44'; Pellè 57'; Crespo 73', 90+1'		Paletta 79' (o.g.)	Stadium: Stadio Ennio Tardini; Attendance: 3,624; Referee: Andrea Gervasoni

29 November 2011 Fourth round	Parma	0–2	Hellas Verona	Parma
20:45 CET (UTC+01:00)			Ferrari 37'; Juanito 62'	Stadium: Stadio Ennio Tardini; Attendance: 3,719; Referee: Sebastiano Peruzzo

== Statistics ==
No.	Pos.	Name	Serie A		Coppa Italia		Total		Discipline	
No.	Pos.	Name	Apps	Goals	Apps	Goals	Apps	Goals	Yellow card	Red card
1	GK	(Italy) Nicola Pavarini (4th captain)	9(1)	0	2	0	11(1)	0	1	0
2	DF	(Brazil) Jonathan	9(3)	1	0	0	9(3)	1	1	0
3	DF	(Venezuela) Rolf Feltscher	2(2)	0	1	0	3(2)	0	1	0
4	MF	(Italy) Stefano Morrone (captain)	24(6)	1	1	0	25(6)	1	8	0
5	DF	(Italy) Cristian Zaccardo (5th captain)	35	1	1(1)	0	35(1)	1	8	0
6	DF	(Italy) Alessandro Lucarelli (vice-captain)	33(1)	2	1	0	34(1)	2	6	1
7	MF	(France) Jonathan Biabiany (6th captain)	27(11)	6	0	0	27(11)	6	3	0
8	MF	(Italy) Daniele Galloppa	28(2)	1	1	0	29(2)	1	8	0
9	FW	(Argentina) Hernán Crespo (3rd captain)	0(4)	0	1(1)	2	1(5)	2	0	0
10	MF	(Italy) Sebastian Giovinco	36	15	1(1)	1	37(1)	16	3	1
11	MF	(Italy) Manuel Coppola	0	0	0	0	0	0	0	0
11	FW	(Italy) Sergio Floccari	24(4)	8	0	0	24(4)	8	1	0
13	DF	(Portugal) Gonçalo Brandão	2	0	0	0	2	0	0	0
14	MF	(Portugal) Danilo Pereira	0(5)	0	0	0	0(5)	0	0	0
15	FW	(Italy) Fabio Borini	0	0	0(1)	0	0(1)	0	0	0
15	MF	(Kenya) McDonald Mariga	11	1	0	0	11	1	3	0
16	MF	(Italy) Francesco Lunardini	0	0	0	0	0	0	0	0
17	MF	(Chile) Jaime Valdés	14(6)	1	1	0	15(6)	1	5	0
18	MF	(Italy) Massimo Gobbi	26	2	0	0	26	2	4	0
19	DF	(Italy) Matteo Rubin	3(1)	0	2	0	5(1)	0	1	0
19	DF	(Italy) Stefano Ferrario	4	0	0	0	4	0	1	0
20	MF	(Italy) Manuele Blasi	0(6)	0	1	0	1(6)	0	0	0
21	FW	(Italy) Nicola Sansone	0	0	0	0	0	0	0	0
21	FW	(Italy) Stefano Okaka	4(10)	3	0	0	4(10)	3	0	0
22	FW	(Italy) Raffaele Palladino	1(4)	0	1	0	2(4)	0	0	0
23	DF	(Italy) Francesco Modesto	20(5)	3	1	0	21(5)	3	1	0
24	MF	(Italy) Gianluca Musacci	7(8)	0	0	0	7(8)	0	4	0
28	MF	(Morocco) Abderrazzak Jadid	5(4)	0	1	0	6(4)	0	1	0
29	DF	(Argentina) Gabriel Paletta	33	4	2	0	35	4	8	0
31	GK	(Italy) Matteo Ferrari	0	0	0	0	0	0	0	0
32	FW	(Italy) Gabriele Paonessa	0	0	0	0	0	0	0	0
32	FW	(Spain) Fernando Marqués	1(3)	1	0	0	1(3)	1	1	0
33	DF	(Italy) Fabiano Santacroce	5(7)	0	1	0	6(7)	0	3	0
40	MF	(Nigeria) Nwankwo Obiora	1	0	0(1)	0	1(1)	0	0	0
77	MF	(Brazil) Zé Eduardo	1(3)	0	0	0	1(3)	0	0	0
80	MF	(Italy) Francesco Valiani	17(9)	1	2	0	19(9)	1	4	0
83	GK	(Italy) Antonio Mirante	29	0	0	0	29	0	1	0
92	GK	(Italy) Alberto Gallinetta	0	0	0	0	0	0	0	0
93	GK	(Italy) Marco D'Arsiè	0	0	0	0	0	0	0	0
99	FW	(Italy) Graziano Pellè	7(4)	1	1(1)	1	8(5)	2	2	0
–	–	Own goals	–	2	–	0	–	2	–	–

Left in August
Left in January
Joined in January

== Transfers ==
Parma's first move of the summer was to activate their option on newly capped Italian international Sebastian Giovinco, who had been on loan the previous season and on whom Parma had an option to buy for 50% for €3 million, despite parent club Juventus' interest in the player. Soon after, Parma resolved a number of co-ownership deals and secured former Parma player Jonathan Biabiany and Gonçalo Brandão on one-year loans. Paolo Castellini, also out on loan the previous year, was again farmed out, this time to relegated side Sampdoria. Meanwhile, right-sided Brazilian Ângelo left the club after the expiry of his contract for Serie A rivals Siena. Despite speculation about his future, Parma legend Hernán Crespo signed a new deal that tied him to the club for another year the day before, later adding that his two objectives for 2011–12 were to help the club avoid relegation and to score a 100th goal for Parma; before the season's start he had bagged 91.

The first day of July saw Blerim Džemaili, whose ownership had just been resolved in favour of Parma, move to Napoli in a €9 million deal which saw the Swiss international move south in exchange for the permanent transfer of experienced midfielder Manuele Blasi and the loan of Italian-Brazilian defender Fabiano Santacroce. The following day saw Parma complete a triple swoop of strikers, as Graziano Pellè, Fabio Borini and Nicola Sansone all arrived on 2 July. Pellè was signed from Dutch side AZ Alkmaar for around €1.5 million after long-term interest, while Sansone was brought in on a free transfer from German giants Bayern Munich. Parma also signed young Italian Fabio Borini from Premier League giants Chelsea after a lengthy pursuit. He had been on loan to Swansea City for the latter part of the previous season, but Parma had been tracking Borini for some months and Borini confirmed he had no regrets over the move, despite Swansea's disappointment.

On 6 July, experienced professional and vice-captain Massimo Paci also left the club, choosing to join Novara after his contract expired and Parma chose not to renew it. On the same day, out of favour striker Valeri Bojinov finally made his move to Sporting CP and Chilean attacking midfielder Jaime Valdés moved the other way on a temporary basis. As a result, one of Parma's main aims for the summer of signing of a forward became more important; however, main target Amauri, on loan to Parma for the second half of the previous year, confirmed his desire to stay at Juventus. Marco Pisano, who had struggled to get many games in his only season as a Parma player behind the more consistent performers Luca Antonelli and Massimo Gobbi at left-back, secured a move to Vicenza on 16 July.

After nearly a month without signing a senior player, Matteo Rubin joined Parma from Torino on 6 August 2011 on a year-long loan deal, with the left-back unsatisfied with life at a Serie B club, although his time at Parma was eventually mutually agreed to be cut short in January. Further developments in the transfer market were not forthcoming until deadline day on 31 August. On that day, summer signing Fabio Borini and Francesco Lunardini were loaned to Roma and Gubbio, respectively. Beanpole striker Sergio Floccari was also loaned from Lazio for a fee of €1.5 million, as Parma finally found a replacement on the target man front.

On 19 January 2012, Parma signed Brazilian right-back Jonathan on loan from Inter Milan until the end of the season. Three days later, Parma also tied up a loan deal for Stefano Okaka on loan from Roma. Towards the end of the window, McDonald Mariga returned from Inter Milan on loan after a previous spell at the club and summer signing Graziano Pellè was loaned to Sampdoria. On 2 February 2012, two days after the transfer window closed, the club's record scorer Hernán Crespo announced that his contract had been terminated after 94 goals in 201 appearances over two spells.

The dates given below relate to the date on which registration for the 2011–12 season was deposited to Serie A. The summer transfer window did not open until 1 July 2011 and it will close on 31 August 2011. Non-EU signings, which are limited to 2 for this season in Serie A and comprise the new registration of those who are not EU or EFTA nationals signed from non-Italian clubs, are marked in yellow.

=== In ===
Date	Pos.	Name	From	Type of Transfer	Fee
24 March 2011	FW	(Italy) Fabio Borini	(England) Chelsea	Full ownership	Free
22 June 2011	MF	(Italy) Sebastian Giovinco	(Italy) Juventus	Co-ownership	€3,000,000
23 June 2011	MF	(Italy) Daniele Galloppa	(Italy) Siena	Half to full ownership	€5,000,000 (player exchange)
24 June 2011	FW	(Italy) Daniele Abbracciante	(Italy) Frosinone	Co-ownership	€250,000
24 June 2011	MF	(Switzerland) Blerim Džemaili	(Italy) Torino	Half to full ownership	€3,500,000
24 June 2011	FW	(Italy) Alessandro Elia	(Italy) Bologna	Half to full ownership	€1,500,000
24 June 2011	MF	(Italy) Niccolò Galli	(Italy) Pergocrema	Half to full ownership	€125,000 (player exchange)
24 June 2011	MF	(Italy) Francesco Pambianchi	(Italy) Pergocrema	Half to full ownership	€125,000 (player exchange)
24 June 2011	MF	(Nigeria) Nwankwo Obiora	(Italy) Inter Milan	Co-ownership	€300,000
24 June 2011	MF	(Italy) Cristian Pedrinelli	(Italy) Brescia	Co-ownership	€1,500,000 (player exchange)
24 June 2011	DF	(Italy) Andrea Rispoli	(Italy) Brescia	Half to full ownership	Free
24 June 2011	MF	(Italy) Francesco Valiani	(Italy) Bologna	Half to full ownership	€2,800,000
25 June 2011	MF	(Italy) Pietro Baccolo	(Italy) Padova	Half to full ownership	Free
25 June 2011	MF	(Italy) Alessio Manzoni	(Italy) Atalanta	Half to full ownership	Free
25 June 2011	FW	(Italy) Raffaele Palladino	(Italy) Juventus	Half to full ownership	Free
27 June 2011	FW	(Italy) Daniel Ciofani	(Italy) Atletico Roma	Half to full ownership	€100,000
29 June 2011	MF	(Italy) Manuele Blasi	(Italy) Napoli	Full ownership	Free
30 June 2011	DF	(Italy) Matteo Di Gennaro	(Italy) Ascoli	Co-ownership	€1,700,000 (player exchange)
30 June 2011	MF	(Italy) Thomas Fabbri	(Italy) Cesena	Co-ownership	€1,000,000 (player exchange)
5 July 2011	DF	(Italy) Alberto Galuppo	(Italy) Cesena	Half to ownership	Undisclosed
5 July 2011	FW	(Italy) Nicola Sansone	(Germany) Bayern Munich	Full ownership	Free
12 July 2011	GK	(Italy) Alberto Gallinetta	(Italy) Inter Milan	Full ownership	Free
12 July 2011	FW	(Italy) Graziano Pellè	(Netherlands) AZ	Full ownership	€1,500,000
14 July 2011	MF	(Italy) Davide Colomba	(Italy) S.P.A.L.	Full ownership	Undisclosed
16 July 2011	DF	(Italy) Raffaele Schiavi	(Italy) Vicenza	Full ownership	Undisclosed
26 July 2011	MF	(Italy) Alessandro Visone	(Italy) Vigor Lamezia	Full ownership	Free
4 August 2011	DF	(Italy) Christopher Petrini	(Italy) Urbetevere	Full ownership	Undisclosed
5 August 2011	DF	(Argentina) Paolo Dellafiore	(Italy) Palermo	Full ownership	Undisclosed
5 August 2011	MF	(Italy) Angelo Bencivenga	(Italy) Livorno	Full ownership	Undisclosed
5 August 2011	MF	(Senegal) Alain Mendy	(Italy) Mantova	Full ownership	Undisclosed
10 August 2011	DF	(Italy) Emanuele Padella	(Italy) Atletico Roma	Full ownership	Undisclosed
24 August 2011	DF	(Ghana) Bright Addae	(Ghana) All Stars	Full ownership	Undisclosed
29 August 2011	DF	(Italy) Riccardo Brosco	(Italy) Triestina	Full ownership	Undisclosed
31 August 2011	FW	(Italy) Nicolò Bonuzzi	Italy Montecchio	Full ownership	Undisclosed
9 September 2011	FW	(Spain) Fernando Marqués	Unattached	Full ownership	Free
3 January 2012	MF	(Italy) Paolo Beatrizzotti	(Italy) Santarcangelo	Half to full ownership	Undisclosed
23 January 2012	MF	(Italy) Lorenzo Crisetig	(Italy) Inter Milan	Co-ownership	Undisclosed
23 January 2012	DF	(Italy) Jacopo Galimberti	(Italy) Inter Milan	Co-ownership	Undisclosed
23 January 2012	FW	(Italy) Diego Mella	(Italy) Inter Milan	Co-ownership	Undisclosed
27 January 2012	MF	(Sweden) David Löfquist	(Sweden) Mjällby AIF	Full ownership	Undisclosed
30 January 2012	FW	(Italy) Samuele Marinucci	(Italy) Fondi	Co-ownership	Undisclosed
30 January 2012	FW	(Italy) Fernando Di Trocchio	(Italy) Fondi	Co-ownership	Undisclosed
31 January 2012	MF	(Montenegro) Irfan Šahman	(Montenegro) Jedinstvo Bijelo Polje	Full ownership	Undisclosed

=== Out ===
Date	Pos.	Name	To	Type of Transfer	Fee
22 June 2011	FW	(Brazil) Reginaldo	(Italy) Siena	Half to full ownership	€2,500,000 (player exchange)
23 June 2011	DF	(Brazil) Ângelo	(Italy) Siena	Full ownership	€2,500,000 (player exchange)
24 June 2011	MF	(Italy) Makris Petrozzi	(Italy) Pergocrema	co-ownership	€250,000 (player exchange)
24 June 2011	MF	(Italy) Alessandro Budel	(Italy) Brescia	Half to full ownership	Free
24 June 2011	MF	(Italy) Nicolás Córdova	(Italy) Brescia	Half to full ownership	Free
24 June 2011	MF	(Italy) Riccardo Pasi	(Italy) Bologna	Half to full ownership	€1,600,000
24 June 2011	MF	(Italy) Andrea Pisanu	(Italy) Bologna	Half to full ownership	€2,500,000
24 June 2011	DF	(Italy) Marco Rossi	(Italy) Cesena	Co-ownership	€2,000,000
24 June 2011	DF	(Italy) Massimo Volta	(Italy) Sampdoria	Half to full ownership	€900,000
24 June 2011	MF	(Italy) Matteo Mandorlini	(Italy) Brescia	Co-ownership	€1,500,000 (player exchange)
25 June 2011	DF	(Italy) Cristian Anelli	(Italy) Valenzana	Half to full ownership	Free
25 June 2011	MF	(Italy) Mario Merlonghi	(Italy) Fondi	Half to full ownership	Free
25 June 2011	MF	(Italy) Daniele Vantaggiato	(Italy) Padova	Half to full ownership	Free
30 June 2011	DF	(Hungary) Zsolt Tamási	(Italy) Ascoli	Co-ownership	€1,700,000 (player exchange)
30 June 2011	MF	(Italy) Filippo Savi	Unattached	Full ownership	Free
30 June 2011	MF	(Italy) Luigi Palumbo	(Italy) Cesena	Co-ownership	€1,000,000 (player exchange)
30 June 2011	GK	(Italy) Diego Manzoni	(Italy) Genoa	Co-ownership	€1,700,000
1 July 2011	MF	(Switzerland) Blerim Džemaili	(Italy) Napoli	Full ownership	€9,000,000
1 July 2011	DF	(Italy) Lorenzo Galassi	(Italy) Novara	Full ownership	Free
6 July 2011	DF	(Italy) Massimo Paci	(Italy) Novara	Full ownership	€300,000
6 July 2011	FW	(Bulgaria) Valeri Bojinov	(Portugal) Sporting CP	Full ownership	€2,600,000
7 July 2011	GK	(Italy) Matteo Pisseri	(Italy) Renate	Co-ownership	Undisclosed
7 July 2011	DF	(Italy) Ronny Valerio	(Italy) Renate	Co-ownership	Undisclosed
8 July 2011	DF	(Italy) Andrea Talignani	(Italy) Virtus Entella	Co-ownership	Undisclosed
8 July 2011	DF	(Guinea) Mohamed Traoré	(Italy) Foggia	Co-ownership	Undisclosed
10 July 2011	MF	(Serbia) Nemanja Čović	(Italy) Vojvodina	Full ownership	Free
13 July 2011	MF	(Italy) Paolo Beatrizzotti	(Italy) Santarcangelo	Co-ownership	Undisclosed
13 July 2011	DF	(Italy) Francesco Pambianchi	(Italy) S.P.A.L.	Co-ownership	€250,000
13 July 2011	MF	(Italy) Alessandro Vecchi	(Italy) S.P.A.L.	Co-ownership	€200,000
16 July 2011	DF	(Italy) Marco Pisano	(Italy) Vicenza	Full ownership	Undisclosed
26 July 2011	GK	(Italy) Andrea Gasparri	(Italy) Fondi	Full ownership	Undisclosed
26 July 2011	DF	(Italy) Abel Gigli	(Italy) Fondi	Full ownership	€500
26 July 2011	FW	(Italy) Daniele Bernasconi	(Italy) Fondi	Full ownership	Undisclosed
26 July 2011	DF	(Italy) Domenico Iovinella	(Italy) Fondi	Full ownership	Undisclosed
5 August 2011	DF	(Argentina) Paolo Dellafiore	(Italy) Novara	Co-ownership	€400,000
5 August 2011	DF	(Italy) Angelo Bencivenga	(Italy) Pro Vercelli	Co-ownership	Undisclosed
10 August 2011	DF	(Italy) Emanuele Padella	(Italy) Grosseto	Co-ownership	Undisclosed
20 August 2011	MF	(Senegal) Alain Mendy	(Italy) Roma	Full ownership	Undisclosed
27 August 2011	DF	(Italy) Riccardo Brosco	(Italy) Pescara	Full ownership	Undisclosed
23 January 2012	MF	(Nigeria) Joel Obi	(Italy) Inter Milan	Half to full ownership	€3,200,000
25 January 2012	MF	(Italy) Manuele Blasi	(Italy) Lecce	Full ownership	Undisclosed
30 January 2012	FW	(Italy) Fabio Borini	(Italy) Roma	Co-ownership	€3,500,000
2 February 2012	FW	(Argentina) Hernán Crespo	Unattached	Full ownership	Free

=== Loan in ===
Date from	Date to	Pos.	Name	From	Fee
23 June 2011	30 June 2012	DF	(Portugal) Gonçalo Brandão	(Italy) Siena	Undisclosed
24 June 2011	30 June 2012	MF	(France) Jonathan Biabiany	(Italy) Sampdoria	Undisclosed
1 July 2011	30 June 2012	DF	(Italy) Fabiano Santacroce	(Italy) Napoli	€500,000
12 July 2011	30 June 2012	MF	(Chile) Jaime Valdés	(Portugal) Sporting CP	Free
18 July 2011	30 June 2012	GK	(Italy) Diego Manzoni	(Italy) Genoa	Undisclosed
29 July 2011	30 June 2012	FW	(Portugal) Fábio Nunes	(Portugal) Portimonense	Undisclosed
4 August 2011	30 June 2012	MF	(Italy) Danilo Mastroianni	(Italy) Frosinone	Undisclosed
4 August 2011	30 June 2012	MF	(Italy) Cristian Bellato	(Italy) Frosinone	Undisclosed
4 August 2011	30 June 2012	FW	(Italy) Gianmarco Torri	(Italy) Frosinone	Undisclosed
4 August 2011	30 June 2012	DF	(Italy) Domenico Frare	(Italy) Sacilese	Undisclosed
4 August 2011	30 June 2012	FW	(Italy) Tommy Maistrello	(Italy) Albano	Undisclosed
8 August 2011	3 January 2012	DF	(Italy) Matteo Rubin	(Italy) Torino	Undisclosed
17 August 2011	30 June 2012	GK	(Italy) Marco Quadrelli	(Italy) Misano	Undisclosed
31 August 2011	30 June 2012	MF	(Italy) Gianluca Musacci	(Italy) Empoli	Undisclosed
31 August 2011	30 June 2012	FW	(Italy) Sergio Floccari	(Italy) Lazio	€1,500,000
11 January 2012	30 June 2012	FW	(Italy) Michele Bentoglio	(Italy) Sarnico	Undisclosed
12 January 2012	30 June 2012	FW	(Italy) Mattia Sprocati	(Italy) Pavia	Undisclosed
23 January 2012	30 June 2012	DF	(Italy) Jonathan	(Italy) Inter Milan	Undisclosed
23 January 2012	30 June 2012	FW	(Italy) Stefano Okaka	(Italy) Roma	Undisclosed
25 January 2012	30 June 2012	DF	(Italy) Stefano Ferrario	(Italy) Lecce	Undisclosed
30 January 2012	30 June 2012	MF	(Kenya) McDonald Mariga	(Italy) Inter Milan	Undisclosed
31 January 2012	30 June 2012	MF	(Hungary) Sebestyén Ihrig-Farkas	(Hungary) Budapest Honvéd	Undisclosed

=== Loan out ===
Date from	Date to	Pos.	Name	To	Fee
24 June 2011	30 June 2012	DF	(Italy) Paolo Castellini	(Italy) Sampdoria	Undisclosed
1 July 2011	30 June 2012	DF	(Italy) Andrea Rispoli	(Italy) Sampdoria	Undisclosed
1 July 2011	23 January 2012	MF	(Nigeria) Joel Obi	(Italy) Inter Milan	Undisclosed
7 July 2011	30 June 2012	DF	(Italy) Alessandro Berselli	(Italy) Valenzana	Undisclosed
7 July 2011	30 June 2012	DF	(Italy) Gian Marco Ferrari	(Italy) Renate	Undisclosed
7 July 2011	30 June 2012	DF	(Italy) Makris Petrozzi	(Italy) Pergocrema	Undisclosed
8 July 2011	30 June 2012	FW	(Bosnia and Herzegovina) Milan Đurić	(Italy) Crotone	Undisclosed
8 July 2011	30 June 2012	DF	(Italy) Luca Tedeschi	(Italy) Crotone	Undisclosed
8 July 2011	30 June 2012	FW	(France) Grégoire Defrel	(Italy) Foggia	Undisclosed
12 July 2011	4 January 2012	FW	(Italy) Francesco Finocchio	(Italy) Cremonese	Undisclosed
13 July 2011	30 June 2012	MF	(Italy) Alessandro De Vitis	(Italy) Modena	Undisclosed
14 July 2011	30 June 2012	MF	(Italy) Niccolò Galli	(Italy) Verona	Undisclosed
14 July 2011	30 January 2012	DF	(North Macedonia) Stefan Ristovski	(Italy) Crotone	Undisclosed
14 July 2011	30 June 2012	MF	(Italy) Davide Colomba	(Italy) Crotone	Undisclosed
14 July 2011	30 June 2012	GK	(Italy) Stefano Russo	(Italy) Nocerina	Undisclosed
15 July 2011	30 June 2012	MF	(Italy) Pietro Baccolo	(Italy) Frosinone	Undisclosed
15 July 2011	30 June 2012	MF	(Italy) Alessio Manzoni	(Italy) Frosinone	Undisclosed
15 July 2011	30 June 2012	GK	(Italy) Ivan Cacchioli	(Italy) Pavia	Undisclosed
16 July 2011	30 June 2012	DF	(Italy) Raffaele Schiavi	(Italy) Padova	Undisclosed
16 July 2011	30 June 2012	DF	(France) Abdou Doumbia	(Italy) Como	€1,000
16 July 2011	30 June 2012	FW	(Italy) Simone Malatesta	(Italy) Pro Vercelli	Undisclosed
20 July 2011	30 June 2012	FW	(Italy) Cristiano Lucarelli	(Italy) Napoli	Undisclosed
20 July 2011	30 June 2012	FW	(Italy) Gianluca Lapadula	(Italy) San Marino	Undisclosed
22 July 2011	30 June 2012	FW	(Italy) Daniel Ciofani	(Italy) Gubbio	Undisclosed
24 July 2011	30 June 2012	MF	(Italy) Alessandro Visone	(Italy) Vigor Lamezia	Undisclosed
28 July 2011	31 January 2012	FW	(Italy) Alessandro Elia	(Italy) Viareggio	Undisclosed
4 August 2011	30 June 2012	MF	(Portugal) Filipe Oliveira	(Hungary) Videoton	Undisclosed
5 August 2011	30 June 2012	MF	(Italy) Giacomo Chiazzolino	(Italy) Valenzana	Free
29 August 2011	30 June 2012	MF	(Italy) Manuel Coppola	(Italy) Empoli	Undisclosed
29 August 2011	30 June 2012	MF	(Argentina) Pablo Fontanello	(Ukraine) Chornomorets	Undisclosed
31 August 2011	30 June 2012	FW	(Italy) Gabriele Paonessa	(Italy) Gubbio	Undisclosed
31 August 2011	30 June 2012	MF	(Italy) Francesco Lunardini	(Italy) Gubbio	Undisclosed
31 August 2011	30 June 2012	FW	(Italy) Nicola Sansone	(Italy) Crotone	Undisclosed
31 August 2011	30 June 2012	FW	(Italy) Fabio Borini	(Italy) Roma	€1,700,000
5 January 2012	30 June 2012	MF	(Nigeria) Nwankwo Obiora	(Italy) Gubbio	Undisclosed
5 January 2012	30 June 2012	FW	(Italy) Francesco Finocchio	(Italy) Fondi	Undisclosed
10 January 2012	30 June 2012	FW	(Italy) Nicolò Bonuzzi	(Italy) Carpi	Undisclosed
18 January 2012	30 June 2012	MF	(Brazil) Zé Eduardo	(Italy) Empoli	Undisclosed
23 January 2012	30 June 2012	MF	(Italy) Lorenzo Crisetig	(Italy) Inter Milan	Undisclosed
30 January 2012	30 June 2012	DF	(North Macedonia) Stefan Ristovski	(Italy) Frosinone	Undisclosed
31 January 2012	30 June 2012	MF	(Morocco) Abderrazzak Jadid	(Italy) Grosseto	Undisclosed
31 January 2012	30 June 2012	MF	(Italy) Graziano Pellè	(Italy) Sampdoria	Undisclosed
31 January 2012	30 June 2012	MF	(Sweden) David Löfquist	(Italy) Gubbio	Undisclosed
31 January 2012	30 June 2012	FW	(Italy) Alessandro Elia	(Italy) Arzanese	Undisclosed
