= Visone (surname) =

Visone is a surname. Notable people with the surname include:

- Alessandro Visone (born 1987), Italian footballer
- Fabio Visone (born 1983), Italian footballer
