= Chiazzolino =

Chiazzolino is an Italian surname. Notable people with the surname include:

- Dario Chiazzolino (born 1985), Italian jazz guitarist and composer
- Giacomo Chiazzolino (born 1986), Italian footballer
