= Alessandro Iacobucci =

Italian footballer (born 1991)

Personal information
- Date of birth: 3 June 1991 (age 35)
- Place of birth: Pescara, Italy
- Height: 1.89 m (6 ft 2 in)
- Position: Goalkeeper

Team information
- Current team: Renato Curi Angolana

Youth career
- Renato Curi Angolana
- 2007–2010: Mantova
- 2010–2011: Siena

Senior career*
Years	Team	Apps	(Gls)
2011–2012	Siena	1	(0)
2011–2012	→ Südtirol (loan)	33	(0)
2012–2015	Parma	7	(0)
2012–2013	→ Spezia (loan)	24	(0)
2013–2014	→ Latina (loan)	42	(0)
2015–2018	Virtus Entella	120	(0)
2018–2021	Frosinone	8	(0)
2021–2022	Pescara	3	(0)
2022–2023	Südtirol	0	(0)
2023	Vicenza	7	(0)
2023–2024	Bellinzona	29	(0)
2024–	Renato Curi Angolana		

International career
2009–2010	Italy U19	0	(0)
2011–2012	Italy U20	8	(0)
2011–2012	Italy U21 Serie B	3	(0)
- * Club domestic league appearances and goals as of 28 May 2024

Alessandro Iacobucci (born 3 June 1991) is an Italian footballer who plays as a goalkeeper for Renato Curi Angolana.

== Club career ==
=== Youth career ===
Born in Pescara, Abruzzo, Iacobucci started his career at home province club Renato Curi Angolana (located at Città Sant'Angelo, the Province of Pescara). He joined Serie B club Mantova in 2007 in temporary deal, rejoining former Curi Angolana team-mate Alberto Creati.

=== Siena ===
After the bankrupt of Mantova, he was automatically released. In July 2010 he was signed by Serie B club Siena. He was one of the backup of Ferdinando Coppola in the first team and as the first choice in the "spring" under-20 team, ahead Richard Gabriel Marcone. Iacobucci made his debut in round 42 (last round), after the team certainly promoted back to Serie A. He replaced Simone Farelli in the second half.

In July 2011 he left for Italian third division club Südtirol, ahead Michał Miśkiewicz as first choice. With the arrival of Iacobucci, South Tyrol also sold its first choice of 2010–11 season, Davide Zomer to Lega Pro Seconda Divisione.

=== Parma ===
In June 2012 Parma signed Andrea Rossi (€1.8M), Iacobucci (€1.7M) and Giuseppe Pacini (€0.5M) from Siena and sold Manuel Coppola (€1.6M), Alberto Galuppo (€1.7M) and Abdou Doumbia (€0.5M) to Siena, in July Siena also signed Paolo Hernán Dellafiore (€1.8M) and sold Gonçalo Brandão (€1.6M) to Parma, made the 8-men swap deal a pure swap without involvement of cash.

On 28 June 2012 Iacobucci was signed by Spezia Calcio in temporary deal. That season Spezia had also signed Stefano Okaka, Raffaele Schiavi, Mário Rui from Parma, Parma half-owned players Lorenzo Crisetig (also from Inter), Matteo Mandorlini (also from Brescia) and Siena player Agostino Garofalo. On 31 January 2013, a pre-set price was insert into the temporary contract of Iacobucci. The co-ownership was also terminated ca. January 2013 for a peppercorn fee of €500. The loan of Iacobucci (€100,000) and Gianluca Musacci (€400,000) had cost Spezia €500,000 but Parma also gave performance subsidy (Italian: premi di valorizzazione) of €200,000 to Spezia for Musacci.

On 10 July 2013 Iacobucci was signed by Latina.

On 7 August 2018, Iacobucci signed with Frosinone.

On 6 November 2021, he joined his hometown club Pescara in Serie C.

On 28 June 2022, Iacobucci returned to Südtirol on a one-year deal. On 13 January 2023, he moved to Vicenza.

== International career ==
Iacobucci received his first U-19 call-up in August 2009, from Massimo Piscedda. However, he did not enter the squad to the friendly match in September. In November, he received a call-up to a goalkeeper training camp from Antonio Rocca. In December, he returned to U19 team for a training camp. He was the backup of Simone Colombi in March 2010 against Germany.

In 2010–11 he was selected to the feeder team of U-21, the Italy under-21 Serie B representative team. He played once, against Serbian First League Selection.

In 2011–12 season he was the regular member of Italy U20 team at 2011–12 Four Nations Tournament. He only missed the last round which played by Mattia Perin. He also played against Ghana, an unofficial match against Italy U-21 Serie B for charity, against Macedonia and Denmark.

In 2012–13 season he played twice for U21 "B", won Malta U21 5–0 and a goalless draw with Russian First League Selection. In both matches Iacobucci was the first choice in the first half; he was replaced by Alessandro Berardi at half-time and Elia Bastianoni in the 81st minute respectively.

== Career statistics ==
Appearances and goals by club, season and competition
Club	Season	League			National cup		Other		Total	
Club	Season	Division	Apps	Goals	Apps	Goals	Apps	Goals	Apps	Goals
Mantova	2008–09	Serie B	0	0	0	0	—		0	0
Mantova	2009–10	Serie B	0	0	0	0	—		1	0
Mantova	Total		22	0	6	0	—		31	0
Siena	2010–11	Serie B	1	0	0	0	—		1	0
Südtirol (loan)	2011–12	Lega Pro 1D	34	0	—		3	0	37	0
Parma	2014–15	Serie A	7	0	0	0	—		7	0
Spezia (loan)	2012–13	Serie B	24	0	1	0	—		25	0
Latina (loan)	2013–14	Serie B	42	0	1	0	4	0	47	0
Virtus Entella	2015–16	Serie B	41	0	1	0	—		42	0
Virtus Entella	2016–17	Serie B	41	0	2	0	—		43	0
Virtus Entella	2017–18	Serie B	38	0	1	0	0	0	39	0
Virtus Entella	Total		120	0	4	0	0	0	124	0
Frosinone	2018–19	Serie A	0	0	0	0	—		0	0
Frosinone	2019–20	Serie B	4	0	1	0	0	0	5	0
Frosinone	2020–21	Serie B	4	0	1	0	—		5	0
Frosinone	Total		8	0	2	0	0	0	10	0
Pescara	2021–22	Serie C	2	0	—		1	0	3	0
Südtirol	2022–23	Serie B	0	0	0	0	—		0	0
Vicenza	2022–23	Serie C	7	0	—		4	0	11	0
Bellinzona	2023–24	Swiss Challenge League	29	0	2	0	—		31	0
Career total			296	0	17	0	11	0	324	0
