= Jonathan Moreira =

Brazilian footballer (born 1986)

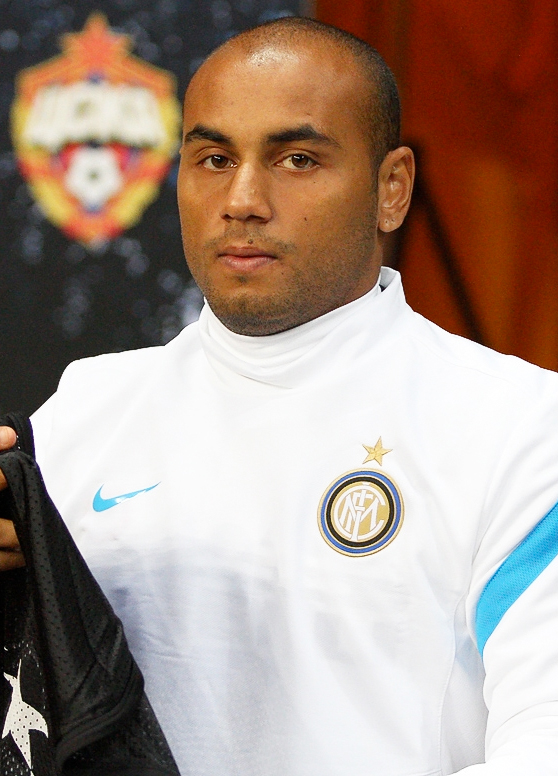
- Jonathan with Inter Milan in 2011

Personal information
- Full name: Jonathan Cícero Moreira
- Date of birth: 27 February 1986 (age 40)
- Place of birth: Conselheiro Lafaiete, Brazil
- Height: 1.70 m (5 ft 7 in)
- Positions: Right-back; wing-back

Youth career
- 2000–2005: Cruzeiro

Senior career*
Years	Team	Apps	(Gls)
2004–2010	Cruzeiro	185	(11)
2011	Santos	13	(1)
2011–2015	Inter Milan	45	(3)
2012	→ Parma (loan)	12	(1)
2015–2016	Fluminense	22	(0)
2017–2021	Athletico Paranaense	82	(4)

International career
2002–2003	Brazil U17	10	(2)
- * Club domestic league appearances and goals as of 18:56, 28 March 2021 (UTC)

Jonathan Cícero Moreira (born 27 February 1986), sometimes known as just Jonathan, is a Brazilian former professional footballer who played as a right-back.

He also holds Italian citizenship.

During his Italian career, he was ironically nicknamed Divino Jonathan (Italian for “Divine Jonathan”).

== Club career ==
=== Cruzeiro ===
Jonathan made his professional debut in the Campeonato Brasileiro for Cruzeiro against Flamengo in a 6–2 away defeat on 19 December 2004. He scored his first goal as professionist against Corinthians in a 3–0 away win on 25 August 2007.

=== Santos ===
In December 2010, Jonathan signed with Santos for €2 million (with Cruzeiro retained 50% registration rights). Santos paid €1.2 million to acquire 30% while Santos's investment partner Terceira Estrela Investimentos S/A (TEISA) acquired 20% for €800,000. He signed a 4-year contract with €15 million release clause. He won Campeonato Paulista and Copa Libertadores with Santos.

=== Inter Milan ===
On 13 July 2011, it was announced that Jonathan would leave Santos to train with Serie A giants Inter Milan, pending the finalization of the transfer. Two days later, on 15 July, he officially became an Inter player, signing a four-year contract. Jonathan made his Inter debut on 11 September 2011 in week two of 2011–12 Serie A, playing the full 90 minutes in a 4–3 away loss to Palermo. Three days later Jonathan made his Champions League debut, playing the entire match on Matchday 1 against Turkish side Trabzonspor in a 0–1 loss at the San Siro.

==== Loan to Parma ====
In January 2012, Moreira moved to Parma on loan until the end of the season where he established himself as the team's regular right wing-back. He debuted with the club on 28 January, coming on as a substitute at half time in place of Brandão in a 1–1 draw against Catania. He scored his first goal with Parma on 11 April 2012 in a 2–0 win at Stadio Ennio Tardini against newly promoted Novara. He helped Parma to finish the season in 8th place.

==== Return to Inter ====
After playing for Parma in the final round, Moreira returned to Milan and was included in the 20-men squad to Indonesia and playing in both exhibition matches. In the playoffs for the Europa League, he played the two legs against Hajduk Split. On 17 April, Moreira scored his first goal for the Nerazzurri in the second leg of the Coppa Italia's semi-final in San Siro against Roma. The match ended 2–3 for the visitors with Jonathan scoring Inter's first goal after a back heel assist by Tommaso Rocchi. On 21 April, Jonathan assisted Tommaso Rocchi for the only goal of the match against Parma, which was scored in 82nd minute, salvaging the club's hopes for qualifying for Europe.

At the end of the season, Inter finished 2012–13 Serie A in a disappointing 9th place, which meant they failed to qualify for either UEFA Champions League or UEFA Europa League for the first time since 1999-2000. For this disappointing position, Stramaccioni was sacked and replaced by Walter Mazzarri, where Jonathan secured a more regular place at starting lineup.

On 18 August 2013, in the opening match of the 2013–14 season, against Cittadella in third round of Coppa Italia, Jonathan scored his first goal of the season after he beat goalkeeper Raffaele Di Gennaro with a header, following a cross from Fredy Guarín. Inter won the match 4–0. In first match of the new season in Serie A, Jonathan assisted the first goal of Yuto Nagatomo in a 2–0 win over against Genoa, helping the team to make a fine start. In second match on 1 September, Jonathan made his second assist of the season by providing the pass for Rodrigo Palacio opening goal of the 3–0 away win against Catania. On 26 September, Jonathan scored his first league goal with Inter in a 2–1 win at San Siro against Fiorentina, giving his team the advantage in the 83rd minute after a powerful shot from inside the box. One month later, Jonathan scored the opener in a 4–2 win over newly promoted Hellas Verona, that was ruled out as an own-goal. Jonathan scored for the second time in Serie A, netting the equalizer in a 1–1 away draw against Bologna on 24 November. Jonathan continued his fine form, supplying his third assist of the season in a 3–3 draw against Parma at the San Siro, assisting Rodrigo Palacio in the 44th minute of the match.

=== Fluminense and Athletico Paranaense ===
On 14 September 2015, Jonathan returned to Brazil and signed for Fluminense until the end of the following year. On 22 December 2016, he moved to Atlético Paranaense.

== International career ==
Jonathan has represented Brazil at under-17 level, playing in 2003 FIFA U-17 World Championship. Brazil reached the final where Jonathan played the full 90 minutes and helped the Seleção beat Spain in a 1–0 win. Jonathan has never been capped at senior level for Brazil, which leaves the door open for either a Brazilian or Italian call-up.

== Career statistics ==
As of 28 March 2021

Appearances and goals by club, season and competition
Club	Season	League			State League		Cup		Continental		Other		Total	
Club	Season	Division	Apps	Goals	Apps	Goals	Apps	Goals	Apps	Goals	Apps	Goals	Apps	Goals
Cruzeiro	2004	Série A	1	0	—		—		—		—		1	0
Cruzeiro	2005	Série A	20	0	0	0	1	0	3 (Note: Appearance(s) in Copa Sudamericana)	0	—		24	0
Cruzeiro	2006	Série A	11	0	14	0	5	0	—		—		30	0
Cruzeiro	2007	Série A	22	1	9	0	3	0	3	0	—		37	1
Cruzeiro	2008	Série A	24	2	10	0	—		6 (Note: Appearance(s) in Copa Libertadores)	0	—		40	2
Cruzeiro	2009	Série A	27	3	10	4	—		14	0	—		51	7
Cruzeiro	2010	Série A	27	0	10	1	—		12	1	—		49	2
Cruzeiro	Total		132	6	53	5	9	0	38	1	—		232	12
Santos	2011	Série A	0	0	13	1	—		7	1	—		20	2
Inter Milan	2011–12	Serie A	4	0	—		0	0	2 (Note: Appearance(s) in UEFA Champions League)	0	—		6	0
Inter Milan	2012–13	Serie A	8	0	—		3	1	12 (Note: Appearance(s) in UEFA Europa League)	0	—		23	1
Inter Milan	2013–14	Serie A	31	3	—		1	1	3	0	—		35	4
Inter Milan	2014–15	Serie A	2	0	—		0	0	—		—		2	0
Inter Milan	Total		45	3	—		4	2	17	0	—		66	5
Parma (loan)	2011–12	Serie A	12	1	—		—		—		—		12	1
Fluminense	2015	Série A	3	0	—		—		—		—		3	0
Fluminense	2016	Série A	11	0	8	0	3	0	—		2 (Note: Appearance(s) in Primeira Liga)	0	24	0
Fluminense	Total		14	0	8	0	3	0	—		2	0	27	0
Athletico Paranaense	2017	Série A	29	2	4	0	1	0	9	0	—		43	2
Athletico Paranaense	2018	Série A	23	1	—		6	0	10	0	—		39	1
Athletico Paranaense	2019	Série A	5	1	—		3	0	7	0	3 (Note: Two appearances in Recopa Sudamericana, one appearance in J.League Cup / Copa Sudamericana Championship)	0	18	1
Athletico Paranaense	2020	Série A	18	0	3	0	3	0	4	0	0	0	28	0
Athletico Paranaense	Total		75	4	7	0	13	0	30	0	3	0	128	4
Career total			278	14	81	6	29	2	92	2	5	0	485	24

== Honours ==
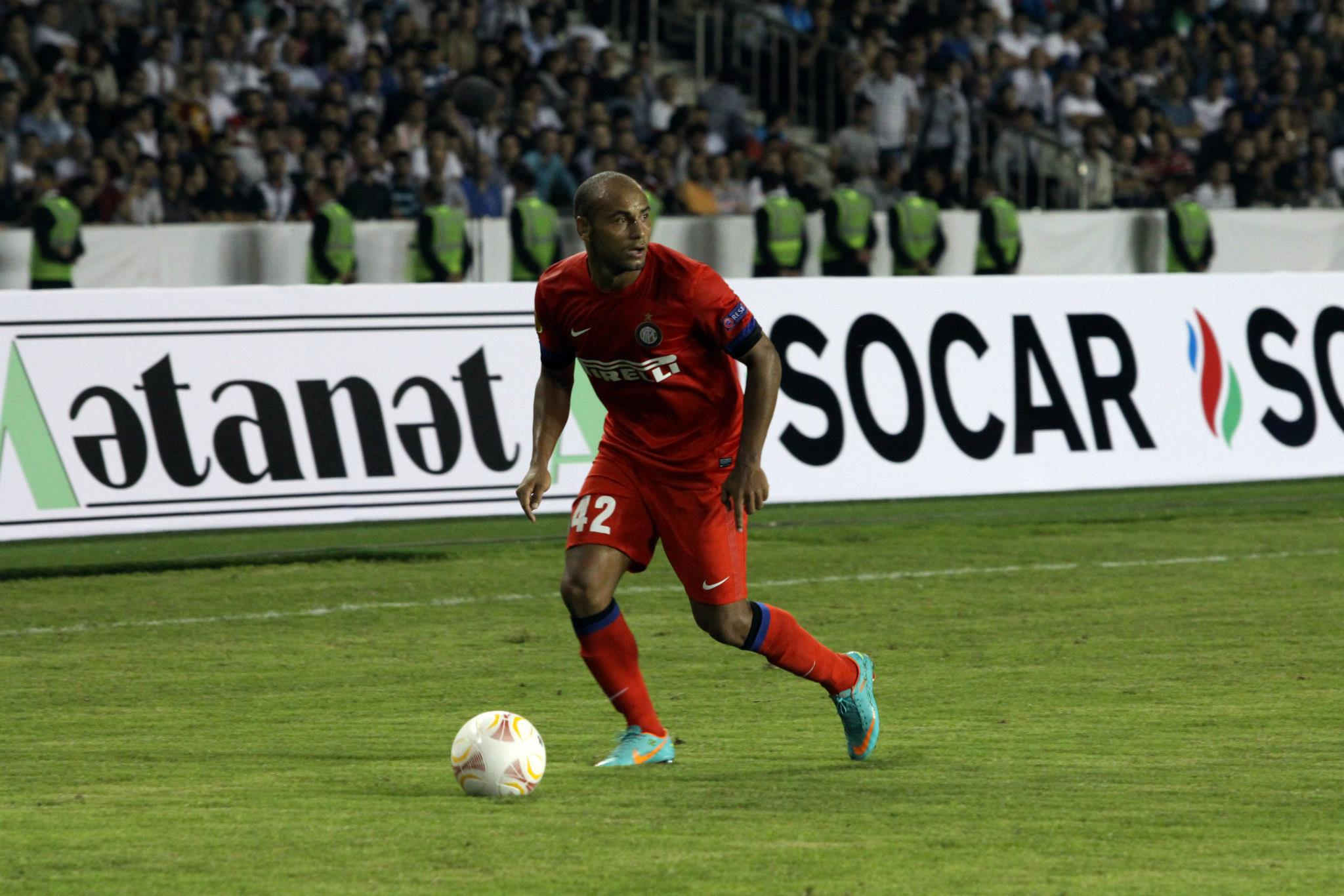
Jonathan in action for Inter Milan in a Europa League match

Cruzeiro

- Campeonato Mineiro: 2006, 2008, 2009

Santos

- Campeonato Paulista: 2011
- Copa Libertadores: 2011

Athletico Paranaense

- Copa Sudamericana: 2018
- J.League Cup / Copa Sudamericana Championship: 2019
- Copa do Brasil: 2019

Brazil U17

- Copa dos Campeões do Mundo Sub-17: 2002
- FIFA U-17 World Cup: 2003

Individual

- Campeonato Brasileiro Série A Team of the Year: 2009
- Bola de Prata: 2009
- Troféu Telê Santa (Best Right Back): 2008, 2009
