= Galassi =

Galassi is an Italian surname. Notable people with the surname include:

- Antonio Galassi (1845–1904), Italian opera singer
- Galasso Galassi, Italian Renaissance painter
- Jonathan Galassi (born 1949), American publisher, translator and poet
- Lorenzo Galassi (born 1991), Italian footballer
- Mara Galassi (born 1956), Italian harpist and musicologist
- Mark Galassi (born 1965), American scientist
