= Alessandro Ranellucci =

Italian footballer (born 1983)

Personal information
- Date of birth: 25 February 1983 (age 43)
- Place of birth: Priverno, Italy
- Height: 1.82 m (5 ft 11 1/2 in)
- Position: Defender

Team information
- Current team: Latina
- Number: 6

Senior career*
Years	Team	Apps	(Gls)
2003–2005	Avezzano	65	(3)
2005–2007	Martina	25	(0)
2007–2008	Valenzana Mado	33	(0)
2008–2009	Vibonese	30	(0)
2009–2010	Valenzana Mado	33	(1)
2010–2014	Pro Vercelli	133	(3)
2014–2018	FeralpiSalò	138	(13)
2018–	Latina		
- * Club domestic league appearances and goals as of 3 June 2018

Alessandro Ranellucci (born 25 February 1983) is an Italian football player. He plays for Latina.

== Club career ==
He made his Serie C debut for Pro Vercelli on 14 September 2011 in a game against Como.
