= Angelo Bencivenga =

Italian footballer (born 1991)

Personal information
- Date of birth: 25 July 1991 (age 35)
- Place of birth: Naples, Italy
- Height: 1.75 m (5 ft 9 in)
- Position: Right midfielder

Team information
- Current team: Santarcangelo

Youth career
- Empoli
- 2008–2009: La Chaux-de-Fonds
- 2009–2010: Udinese
- 2010–2011: Livorno

Senior career*
Years	Team	Apps	(Gls)
2010–2011	Livorno	1	(0)
2011	→ Lumezzane (loan)	10	(0)
2011–2015	Parma	0	(0)
2011–2012	→ Pro Vercelli (loan)	38	(1)
2013	→ Ternana (loan)	6	(1)
2013–2014	→ Lecce (loan)	5	(0)
2014	→ Como (loan)	8	(0)
2013–2014	→ Foggia (loan)	35	(0)
2015–2016	Foggia	5	(0)
2017	Messina	1	(0)
2017	Nerostellati Frattese	2	(0)
2018	Team Altamura	3	(0)
2019–	Santarcangelo	7	(1)
- * Club domestic league appearances and goals as of 10 April 2019

Angelo Bencivenga (born 25 July 1991) is an Italian footballer who plays as a right midfielder for Santarcangelo.

== Career ==
Bencivenga returned to Italy in January 2009 for Udinese in January 2009, from Swiss side La Chaux-de-Fonds.

In summer 2011, Bencivenga was signed by Parma F.C. on free transfer, but joined Simone Malatesta at Pro Vercelli in a co-ownership soon after, for €500. On 22 June 2012, Parma became full owners of the player again, but also formed a new temporary deal for Bencivenga. On 31 January 2013 he joined Ternana.
