= Antonio Piccolo (footballer, born 1990) =

Italian footballer

Personal information
- Full name: Antonio Piccolo
- Date of birth: 18 July 1990 (age 36)
- Place of birth: Pomigliano d'Arco, Italy
- Height: 1.80 m (5 ft 11 in)
- Position: Goalkeeper

Youth career
- Torino
- 2008–2010: Juventus

Senior career*
Years	Team	Apps	(Gls)
2011	Milazzo	4	(0)

International career
2009	Italy U20	1	(0)
- * Club domestic league appearances and goals

Antonio Piccolo (born 18 July 1990) is an Italian footballer who plays as a goalkeeper.

== Career ==
=== Youth career ===
Born in Pomigliano d'Arco, Campania region, Piccolo was signed by Northern Italy club Torino F.C. at a young age. He was the backup of Lys Gomis in 2007–08, in the reserve league. In 2008, Piccolo was signed by city rival Juventus FC He compete with Carlo Pinsoglio for the first choice in the first half of the reserve league, which Piccolo played in round 2, 4, 7, 9, 12 and round 20. In the second half of the season Timothy Nocchi became the second keeper with two appearances. In June 2009 Piccolo was lent to Juventus Berretti U18 team, or the B team of the reserve, for the playoffs round. The Old Lady was beaten by A.C. Milan in the final (1–2) of the wildcard group, however Juventus only used two "more mature" players Piccolo and Alessio Curcio in the starting line-up, and most of its original Berretti team, however Milan used majority of its A.C. Milan Primavera (despite not all of the regular starter) and some Berretti players. Pinsoglio continued to play as the first choice in the 2009–10 reserve league.

=== Milazzo ===
After being without a club for 6 months, Piccolo was signed by S.S. Milazzo in January 2011.

=== International career ===
Piccolo capped once for Italy national under-20 football team in December after finishing as the runner-up of Berretti League in June 2009. He also became the backup keeper for Vincenzo Fiorillo in the 2009 FIFA U-20 World Cup in October 2009 along with Andrea Gasparri.

== Personal life ==
He is the brother of Felice Piccolo, a footballer and a Juventus youth product.
