= Manuel Coppola =

Italian footballer (born 1982)

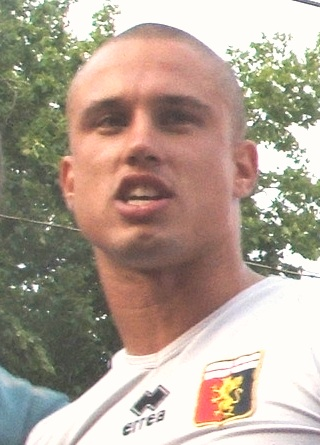

Personal information
- Full name: Manuel Coppola
- Date of birth: 11 May 1982 (age 44)
- Place of birth: Rome, Italy
- Height: 1.72 m (5 ft 8 in)
- Position: Midfielder

Senior career*
Years	Team	Apps	(Gls)
2000–2004	Tivoli	74	(2)
2004	Messina	0	(0)
2004	→ Brindisi (loan)	11	(1)
2004–2005	Salernitana	34	(0)
2005–2008	Genoa	95	(1)
2008–2009	Siena	27	(0)
2009–2012	Parma	1	(0)
2009–2010	→ Torino (loan)	17	(0)
2010–2011	→ Lecce (loan)	14	(0)
2011–2012	→ Empoli (loan)	31	(0)
2012–2014	Siena	2	(0)
2013–2014	→ Cesena (loan)	44	(1)
2014–2015	Cesena	11	(0)
2015	Catania	13	(0)
2015–2017	Ternana	40	(0)
- * Club domestic league appearances and goals as of 08:34, 25 August 2017 (UTC)

Manuel Coppola (born 11 May 1982) is an Italian former footballer who played as a midfielder.

== Career ==
=== Early career ===
Born in Rome, Lazio, Coppola started his professional career at Tivoli. In January 2004 he was signed by Messina, but spent the remainder of the season at Brindisi. In July 2004 he was exchanged for Marco Zoro, who was already on loan at Messina. Messina also retained the 50% registration rights.

=== Genoa ===
In June 2005, Messina bought back Coppola and sent him on loan to Genoa. Coppola won promotion back to Serie B in 2006. In mid-2006 Coppola joined Genoa outright for an undisclosed fee, while Messina secured the services of Antonio Ghomsi for free, Daniele De Vezze and Massimo Minetti. He won promotion to Serie A in 2006–07 Serie B. Coppola was not included in the club plan for the 2007–08 Serie A, which he only played once.

=== Siena ===
In January 2008, he moved to another Serie A club Siena in a temporary deal, with the option to buy half of the registration rights. In June 2008 Siena exercised this option for €1.5 million. In July 2008 Siena also signed Abdelkader Ghezzal (for €3.5 million, Genoa bought him for €2 million in June) and bought back Fernando Forestieri for €4.5 million in June (was €1.7 million a year before). The deals effectively made Siena paid Genoa €500,000 cash and 50% registration rights of Forestieri to acquire 50% registration rights of Coppola and Ghezzal from Genoa and Genoa paid Crotone €2 million cash for Ghezzal.

Coppola was only able to play 15 games during the 2008–09 Serie A season. In June 2009 Siena signed Coppola outright for another €1.5 million and also signed Gianluca Pegolo for €1 million (a year before a free agent). Co-currently, Siena sold Houssine Kharja to Genoa for €6.5 million. The deals, again effectively made Genoa acquired Kharja for €4 million cash plus 50% registration rights of Coppola and Pegolo. However, Coppola was involved in another player swap.

=== Parma ===
Coppola moved to Parma on 1 July 2009 for €3 million (plus €250,000 other fees), on a five-year contract. In June 2009 Parma also signed Daniele Galloppa (in co-ownership for €5M); Parma sold Francesco Parravicini (€2.5M ) and Reginaldo (50% rights for €2.5 million) to Siena in June. The deals, again effectively made Parma acquired 50% registration rights of Galloppa and full rights of Coppola for €3 million cash plus full rights of Parravicini and 50% registration rights of Reginaldo from Siena. (In 2011 Parma gave Ângelo to Siena for €2.5 million, who a year before a free agent, and another 50% of Reginaldo to Siena for €2.5 million, to acquire the remaining 50% of Galloppa for €5 million)

After not playing for Parma in the first two games, On 28 August 2009, Coppola was loaned to Torino along with Julio César de León for free. Parma also signed Nicola Amoruso from Turin on the same day also for free. However, Torino also received €250,000 as premi di valorizzazione for León's deal.

In the summer 2010 of Coppola left for US Lecce in temporary deal for €400,000; however, the loan contract also included a bonus deal that Parma paid Lecce €600,000 as premi di valorizzazione, effectively made Parma had to subsidy the loan deal for €200,000 cash.

In the summer of 2011 Coppola left for Empoli F.C. for €300,000 in temporary deal, co-currently Gianluca Musacci moved to Parma also in temporary deal for €300,000.

=== Siena return ===
In June 2012, he returned to Siena from Parma in a co-ownership deal; however, it was a financial success only. (Note: The club swapped Coppola (€1.6M), Alberto Galuppo (€1.7M) and Abdou Doumbia (€0.5M) with Andrea Rossi (€1.8M), Alessandro Iacobucci (€1.7M) and Giuseppe Pacini (€0.5M), all in co-ownership deal. However, none of the Parma new signing actually played for the club and neither Galuppo and Doumbia did, for Siena. Coppola himself left Siena on 24 January 2013, to Cesena. However, in accounting, Siena received a notional selling profit on Rossi (€3,592,198), Iacobucci (€3,394,779), Pacini (€1M) as well as on Parma side (selling profit on Coppola (€1,311,000), Doumbia (€968,800) and Galuppo (€2.4 million)). Moreover, despite Parma paid €200,000 cash to Siena in June, in July Siena signed Paolo Hernán Dellafiore for €1.8 million in co-ownership deal and sold Gonçalo Brandão to Parma for €1.6 million also in co-ownership deal, made the deals were purely player swap in summer transfer window, as well as the increase in company asset as player selling profit was in fact increase in cost on purchase players, which would increase the amortization expense in the future seasons. (player contract was capitalized as a capital: intangible assets))

Coppola wore no.5 shirt for Siena; however, Coppola again failed to adapt to Serie A football; even Siena was struggling in the bottom.

=== Cesena ===
In January 2013, he left for AC Cesena in temporary deal; the deal was extended on 4 July 2013. In June 2014 the co-ownership between Siena and Parma on Coppola was renewed again. On 15 July 2014, Siena officially expelled from Serie B due to financial difficulties, thus Coppola became a free agent. On 23 July 2014, Coppola signed a one-year contract with Serie A newcomers Cesena.

=== Catania ===
On 13 January 2015, Coppola was transferred to Serie B club Calcio Catania on a 1 1/2-year contract. Catania was relegated at the start of 2015–16 season due to match fixing scandal, thus Coppola left the club.

=== Ternana ===
On 27 August 2015, Coppolla was signed by Serie B club Ternana Calcio in a one-year deal.
