= Sergio Carnesalini =

Italian footballer (born 1982)

Personal information
- Date of birth: 29 August 1982 (age 44)
- Place of birth: Treviglio, Italy
- Position: Right-back

Youth career
- Atalanta

Senior career*
Years	Team	Apps	(Gls)
2001–2002	Atalanta	0	(0)
2001–2002	→ Alzano (loan)	17	(0)
2002–2004	Aglianese	62	(0)
2004–2005	Lucchese	26	(0)
2005–2006	Cuoiovaldarno		
2006–2007	Lecco	21	(0)
2007–2013	Viareggio	89	(1)
2011	→ Ravenna (loan)	14	(0)

International career
2001	Italy U-20	2	(0)
- * Club domestic league appearances and goals

Sergio Carnesalini (born 29 August 1982) is an Italian former footballer.

Carnesalini had played over 110 games in both Serie C1 and Serie C2.

== Biography ==
Born in Treviglio, the Province of Bergamo, Carnesalini started his career at Atalanta Bergamo. He spent a season with Alzano, and in mid-2002 sold to Aglianese in co-ownership deal. In mid-2004 he was signed by Serie C1 side Lucchese but missed the entire 2005–06 season. He then joined Lecco. Despite only played 14 games in regular season, he played all 4 promotion play-offs. He only played 7 games in 2007–08 Serie C1 and in January 2008 returned to Serie C2 side Viareggio. He followed the team promoted to Prima Divisione (ex- Serie C1) in 2009 despite losing the promotion play-offs and winning the relegation play-out in 2010.

On 3 July 2010 he signed a new 3-year contract, becoming one of the longest serving defenders along with Lorenzo Fiale. Despite a regular starter, he was swapped with Ravenna's Alessandro Visone on 10 January 2011, with Nicolò Brighenti replacing his starting place. That season he played once in the cup and a combined 31 games in the league, missed once in round 25 due to suspension. He also played in both legs of the relegation play-outs.
