= Alessandro Berselli =

Italian association footballer (born 1990)

Personal information
- Full name: Alessandro Berselli
- Date of birth: 20 September 1990 (age 36)
- Place of birth: Reggio Emilia, Italy
- Position: Defender

Team information
- Current team: Valenzana

Senior career*
Years	Team	Apps	(Gls)
2011–	Parma	0	(0)
2011–2012	→ Valenzana (loan)	24	(0)
- * Club domestic league appearances and goals as of 26 May 2012

Alessandro Berselli (born 20 September 1990) is an Italian professional footballer who plays for Valenzana on loan from Parma.
