= Andrea Rossi (footballer) =

Italian footballer (born 1986)

Personal information
- Date of birth: 7 November 1986 (age 40)
- Place of birth: San Benedetto del Tronto, Italy
- Height: 1.77 m (5 ft 10 in)
- Position: Defender

Senior career*
Years	Team	Apps	(Gls)
2002–2003	Truentina Castel di Lama	22	(3)
2003–2007	Juventus	0	(0)
2006–2007	→ Siena (loan)	4	(0)
2007–2012	Siena	57	(0)
2012–2015	Parma	0	(0)
2012–2013	→ Cesena (loan)	15	(0)
2013	→ Bari (loan)	16	(0)
2013–2014	→ Pescara (loan)	32	(1)
2014–2015	→ Latina (loan)	17	(0)
2015–2018	Pescara	18	(0)
2015–2016	→ Salernitana (loan)	25	(0)
2016–2017	→ Brescia (loan)	4	(0)
2017	→ Ternana (loan)	2	(0)
2018	Teramo	0	(0)
- * Club domestic league appearances and goals as of 4 March 2018

Andrea Rossi (born 7 November 1986) is an Italian former footballer who played as a defender.

== Career ==
He was one of the members of Juventus's under-20 team to win the 2006 Primavera League.

=== Siena ===
He was on loan to Siena in summer 2006, and made his debut on 17 December 2006 against Atalanta B.C. At the end of season, half of the registration rights of Rossi was sold for €400,000 fee Siena signed him outright for another €1 million fee in June 2008.

=== Parma ===
In June 2012, he moved to Parma in a 5-year deal after making 61 league appearances in his six years at Siena. The deal was a mega cashless player swap (in another co-ownership deals), which saw Rossi, Iacobucci, Pacini and Brandão moved to Parma and Coppola, Doumbia, Galuppo and Dellafiore moved to Siena. He was one of the 32 players for the pre-season camp of Parma. However, along with Brandão they left for Cesena, which Parma had signed Marco Parolo and Yohan Benalouane on temporary deals from Cesena on 7 July and on 20 August for €1 million and for free. Parma also subsidized Cesena for €3 million as premi di valorizzazione for Rossi and Brandão. In January 2013, he was signed by Bari. In July 2013 Rossi left for Pescara. In June 2014 the co-ownership deal of Rossi was renewed. Nevertheless, Parma acquired Rossi outright in July after the bankruptcy of Siena.

On 8 July 2014, he was signed by Latina on a temporary deal. Rossi left Parma in January 2015, after the club faced a financial difficulty that eventually bankrupted in June 2015.

=== Pescara ===
In January 2015 Rossi returned to Pescara again for an undisclosed fee. On 10 July Rossi signed a new 3-year contract.

On 29 August 2015, he was signed by Salernitana on a 2-year loan, with an option to sign outright.

On 29 August 2016 Rossi was signed by Brescia on a temporary deal from Pescara. On 31 January 2017 he left for Ternana on loan. On 31 January 2018, he left Pescara as a free agent.

=== Teramo ===
On 2 February 2018, Teramo announced the signing of Andrea Rossi on a six-month contract.
