= Paolo Beatrizzotti =

Italian football player

Personal information
- Date of birth: 3 November 1992 (age 33)
- Place of birth: Italy
- Position: Midfielder

Team information
- Current team: Santarcangelo (on loan from Parma)

Youth career
- Parma
- 2011–2012: Santarcangelo
- 2012: Parma

Senior career*
Years	Team	Apps	(Gls)
2012–	Parma	0	(0)
2012–	→ Santarcangelo (loan)	1	(0)
- * Club domestic league appearances and goals as of 3 September 2012

Paolo Beatrizzotti (born 3 November 1992 in Parma, Italy) is an Italian football player who is currently playing for Santarcangelo on loan from Parma.

== Career ==
In July 2011, Beatrizzotti moved from Parma to Santarcangelo on a co-ownership deal, but full ownership returned to Parma in January 2012. In July 2012, he returned to Santarcangelo on a year's loan.
