= Thomas Fabbri =

Italian footballer

Personal information
- Date of birth: 21 June 1991 (age 35)
- Place of birth: Cesena, Italy
- Height: 1.79 m (5 ft 10 1/2 in)
- Position: Defender

Youth career
- Cesena

Senior career*
Years	Team	Apps	(Gls)
2011–2015	Parma	0	(0)
2011–2012	→ Bellaria (loan)	3	(0)
2012–2013	→ Santarcangelo (loan)	0	(0)
- * Club domestic league appearances and goals

Thomas Fabbri (born 21 June 1991) is an Italian footballer who plays as a defender.

== Career ==
Fabbri spent the 2009–10 season with the Cesena youth reserve side in the national "spring" league. In June 2011 he was exchanged with Luigi Palumbo. Both players was signed by co-ownership deal and valued the 50% registration rights for €1 million. Both clubs had a selling profit of nearly €2 million, however the increase only in form of intangible asset (the contract value of T.Fabbri and L.Palumbo) Both players signed a 4-year contract.

T.Fabbri joined Bellaria along with other Cesena team-mate Jacopo Luppi, Marcello Scarponi, Michele Gabbianelli. The Romagna club also retained Alessio Briglia who already transferred to Cesena in March 2011. Moreover, the team was coached by Nicola Campedelli, the brother of Cesena president.

In summer 2012 he was signed by Santarcangelo. The co-ownership of T.Fabbri was renewed and Palumbo joined Cesena outright on 20 June 2013. On the same day Cesena also bought back Nicola Del Pivo and sold Gianluca Lapadula back to Parma. in June 2014 the co-ownership was renewed again.
