= Giacomo Chiazzolino =

Italian professional footballer

Personal information
- Date of birth: 25 May 1986 (age 40)
- Place of birth: Turin, Italy
- Height: 1.82 m (6 ft 0 in)
- Position: Midfielder

Team information
- Current team: Alpignano Calcio

Youth career
- Juventus

Senior career*
| Years | Team | Apps | (Gls) |
| 2003–2006 | Juventus | 0 | (0) |
| 2003–2004 | → Orbassano (loan) | 27 | (2) |
| 2004–2005 | → Giaveno (loan) | 28 | (3) |
| 2006–2008 | Carpenedolo | 45 | (1) |
| 2008–2012 | Parma | 0 | (0) |
| 2008–2009 | → Legnano (loan) | 29 | (1) |
| 2009–2010 | → Alessandria (loan) | 6 | (0) |
| 2010–2011 | → Campobasso (loan) | 22 | (2) |
| 2011–2012 | → Valenzana (loan) | 25 | (4) |
| 2012–2014 | Castiglione | 32 | (3) |
| 2014–2016 | Bra | 61 | (10) |
| 2016–2017 | ASD Pro Settimo | 26 | (3) |
| 2017–2018 | ASD Borgaro Nobis | 32 | (0) |
| 2018–2019 | Orizzonti United | | |
| 2019– | Alpignano Calcio | | |
- * Club domestic league appearances and goals

Giacomo Chiazzolino (born 25 May 1986) is an Italian professional footballer who plays for Alpignano Calcio.

== Biography ==
On 17 June 2008 Chiazzolino was signed by Parma for €100,000 in 5-year contract. During 2007–08 season Parma also signed 50% registration rights of Massimo Volta from Carpenedolo. Chiazzolino spent entire Parma career in temporary deals to other clubs. In 2011 Chiazzolino was signed by Valenzana in another temporary deal. On 18 July 2012 Chiazzolino left for Castiglione.

On 3 January 2014 Chiazzolino left for Bra. Both clubs relegated to Serie D at the end of season.

On 20 August 2019, Chiazzolino signed for Alpignano Calcio.
