= Simone Malatesta =

Italian footballer

Personal information
- Date of birth: 9 February 1982 (age 44)
- Place of birth: Rome, Italy
- Position: Forward

Team information
- Current team: Lupa Roma

Youth career
- Modena

Senior career*
Years	Team	Apps	(Gls)
1999–2000	Modena	5	(0)
2000–2002	Juventus	0	(0)
2000–2001	→ Maceratese (loan)	15	(0)
2001–2002	→ Castelnuovo (loan)	25	(2)
2002–2005	Valenzana	73	(9)
2005–2006	Prato	30	(7)
2006–2007	Biellese	32	(12)
2007–2008	Carpenedolo	32	(19)
2008–2009	Venezia	18	(9)
2009–2014	Parma	0	(0)
2009–2010	→ Mantova (loan)	13	(1)
2010–2011	→ Carpi (loan)	11	(3)
2011–2012	→ Pro Vercelli (loan)	43	(15)
2012–2013	→ Carrarese (loan)	19	(0)
2013–2014	→ Ascoli (loan)	11	(3)
2014	→ Gavorrano (loan)	10	(0)
2014–	Lupa Roma	0	(0)
- * Club domestic league appearances and goals

Simone Malatesta (born 9 February 1982) is an Italian footballer, who plays as a forward for Italian Serie C club Lupa Roma

== Career ==
=== Juventus and early career ===
Born in Rome, Lazio, Malatesta started his career at Modena F.C. In January 2000 Malatesta left for Juventus for 400 million Lire (about €206,583) in co-ownership deal. Malatesta left for two Serie C2 clubs in temporary deal in 2000–01 and 2001–02 season. In July 2002 Modena gave up the remain registration rights to Juventus. Malatesta was immediately sold to Valenzana Calcio in another co-ownership deal for a peppercorn fee of €1,000.

=== Lega Pro clubs ===
In June 2003 Malatesta joined Valenzana outright. Malatesta played for 4 different clubs from 2005 to 2009. Malatesta joined Venezia in mid-2008 in co-ownership deal. In June 2009 Venezia bought another 50% registration rights from Carpenedolo. However Venezia soon bankrupted.

=== Parma ===
Malatesta was signed by Parma F.C. in July 2009, for €10,000, but left for Mantova in another co-ownership deal for €100,000. The Serie B team relegated at the end of season. In June 2010 Parma bought back Malatesta for a peppercorn, days before the bankruptcy of Mantova.

Malatesta left for Carpi and in January 2011 for Pro Vercelli. In July 2011, his loan to Pro Vercelli was renewed for another year.

On 31 August 2012 he was signed by Carrarese along with Nicolò Belotti.

On 1 August 2013 Malatesta joined Italian third division club Ascoli Calcio 1898 in temporary deal. On 11 January 2014 the loan was terminated.

He was signed by Gavorrano in another temporary deal in January 2014.

=== Serie C clubs ===
On 6 September 2014 he was signed by Serie C club Lupa Roma.
