= Fabio Visone =

Italian footballer

Matteo Visone
Personal information
- Date of birth: November 26, 1983 (age 42)
- Place of birth: Naples, Italy
- Height: 1.78 m (5 ft 10 in)
- Position: Midfielder

Team information
- Current team: Foggia

Senior career*
Years	Team	Apps	(Gls)
2000–2003	Avellino	35	(46)
2003–2004	Palmese	23	(12)
2005	Nocerina	12	(0)
2005	Monza	1	(3)
2006	Fermana	13	(1)
2006–2009	Sambenedettese	46	(4)
2009–	Foggia		
- * Club domestic league appearances and goals as of June 22, 2009

Fabio Visone (born 26 November 1983) is an Italian football player.

== Football career ==
Visone started his career at Campanian club Avellino of Serie C1. He then played for Palmese in Serie D. In January 2005, he signed for A.S.G. Nocerina. However, in July 2006, he signed a new contract with Sambenedettese, earning 46 appearances and 1 goal. In August, 2009, he signed a contract with Foggia.
