= Emanuele Padella =

Italian footballer (born 1988)

Personal information
- Date of birth: 24 September 1988 (age 38)
- Place of birth: Rome, Italy
- Height: 1.85 m (6 ft 1 in)
- Position: Defender

Team information
- Current team: Fermana

Senior career*
Years	Team	Apps	(Gls)
2007–2010	Cisco Roma	29	(2)
2008–2009	→ Prato (loan)	17	(1)
2010–2011	Atletico Roma	30	(4)
2011–2013	Grosseto	59	(2)
2013	Virtus Entella	14	(0)
2014–2017	Benevento	81	(4)
2017–2019	Ascoli	57	(2)
2019–2023	Vicenza	85	(3)
2023	Mantova	9	(1)
2023–	Fermana	0	(0)
- * Club domestic league appearances and goals as of 22 April 2023

Emanuele Padella (born 24 September 1988) is an Italian professional footballer who plays as a defender who plays for Eccellenza club Fermana.

== Club career ==
On 10 August 2011, he joined Grosseto on a co-ownership deal.

On 13 August 2013, he was signed by Virtus Entella.

On 11 July 2019, he signed a 2-year contract with Serie C club Vicenza.

On 19 January 2023, Padella moved to Mantova.

On 22 August 2023, Padella joined Fermana on a one-season deal.
