= Andrea Gasparri =

Italian footballer (born 1989)

Personal information
- Full name: Andrea Gasparri
- Date of birth: 28 February 1989 (age 37)
- Place of birth: Siena, Italy
- Height: 1.90 m (6 ft 3 in)
- Position: Goalkeeper

Team information
- Current team: Poggibonsi

Youth career
- Siena
- 2007–2008: → Parma (loan)
- 2008–2009: Parma

Senior career*
Years	Team	Apps	(Gls)
2009–2011	Parma	0	(0)
2009–2010	→ Giulianova (loan)	11	(0)
2010–2011	→ Giacomense (loan)	2	(0)
2011–2014	Fondi	47	(0)
2014	Staggia	?	(0)
2014–	Poggibonsi	0	(0)

International career
2007	Italy U-18	1	(0)
2008–2009	Italy U-20	2	(0)
- * Club domestic league appearances and goals

Andrea Gasparri (born 28 February 1989) is an Italian former professional footballer who played as a goalkeeper.

== Club career ==
=== Youth career ===
Born in Siena, Tuscany, Gasparri started his career at Siena. In 2007, he left for fellow Serie A club Parma. He beaten Eros Corradini to play as a first choice in the "spring" under-20 team. Gasparri also played half of the "spring" game for Siena in 2006–07 season. Gasparri won a shirt number in the first team (No.22) in 2008–09 season, after the left of Luca Bucci, Fabio Virgili, Corradini and Radek Petr. The relegated club signed Gasparri in co-ownership deal in July 2008, for a peppercorn of €500. He was the third keeper, behind Nicola Pavarini and new signing Gianluca Pegolo. In January 2009 Parma signed Paolo Ginestra, made him became the fourth.

=== Parma and loans ===
In 2009, he graduated from the youth team, signing a temporary deal with Giulianova. He was the understudy of Ivan Dazzi. In June 2010 Parma signed Gasparri outright from Siena. In 2010, he left for Giacomense. He only played twice as a backup of Giacomo Poluzzi. In July, he left for Fondi in co-ownership deal, along with Parma team-mate Abel Gigli, youngster Daniele Bernasconi and Domenico Iovinella. Gasparri became the first choice ahead Pasquale Mezzacapo and Alex Danelutti. However Gasparri was injured from round 25 to 28. Coach Ezio Capuano forced to use Mezzacapo instead as well as Allievi U-17 team player De Lucia as backup (1 game).

=== Later career ===
After relegation to Serie D, Gasparri stayed initially at Fondi but joined Eccellenza club Stabbia later during the 2013–14 season, then joining Poggibonsi of Serie D in July 2014.

== International career ==
Despite not playing any game in Italy U-19 team (he did receive call-up but did not enter the final squad for the 2007 elite round), Gasparri won a call-up to 2009 FIFA U-20 World Cup. He was the backup keeper of Vincenzo Fiorillo, along with Antonio Piccolo. Before that tournament Francesco Rocca also selected Gasparri to 2009 Mediterranean Games to prepare for the World Youth Cup. He did not play any game in either tournament. After the World Youth Cup (and since he left the youth system) he failed to win any call-up.
