= Paolo Dellafiore =

Argentine-born Italian footballer (born 1985)

Personal information
- Full name: Paolo Hernán Dellafiore
- Date of birth: 2 February 1985 (age 41)
- Place of birth: Buenos Aires, Argentina
- Height: 1.86 m (6 ft 1 in)
- Position: Centre back

Youth career
- 1999–2004: Inter Milan

Senior career*
Years	Team	Apps	(Gls)
2004–2006	Inter Milan	0	(0)
2005	→ Spezia (loan)	13	(0)
2005–2006	→ Treviso (loan)	23	(1)
2006–2009	Palermo	8	(0)
2007–2008	→ Torino (loan)	25	(1)
2009	→ Torino (loan)	11	(2)
2009–2011	Parma	24	(0)
2011	→ Cesena (loan)	7	(0)
2011–2012	Novara	17	(0)
2012–2014	Siena	37	(1)
2013	→ Padova (loan)	12	(0)
2014–2017	Latina	112	(5)
2018	Perugia	10	(0)
2019	Paganese	11	(0)
2019–2020	Mantova	4	(0)
2020–2021	Sona Calcio	18	(1)
2021–2022	Real Calepina FC	13	(0)
Total		345	(11)

International career
2001	Italy U15	3	(0)
2004–2006	Italy U20	3	(0)
2005–2008	Italy U21	4	(0)

Managerial career
- 2025–2026: Inter Milan (youth)
- 2026–: Inter U18
- * Club domestic league appearances and goals

Paolo Hernán Dellafiore (born 2 February 1985) is an Argentine-Italian professional manager and former footballer who is currently as a head coach for Inter U18.

== Club career ==
=== Internazionale ===
Born in Buenos Aires to Italian parents, Dellafiore started his professional career with Internazionale. Dellafiore had played for Inter since the 1999–2000 season and was promoted to the Primavera team, during the 2002–03 season. He made his debut with the nerazzurri in a UEFA Champions League match against R.S.C. Anderlecht, on 7 December 2004. He then spent two seasons on loan to Serie C1's Spezia (with Riccardo Meggiorini) and Serie A's Treviso.

=== Palermo ===
In 2006, he was sold to Palermo for €1.5 million as part of the deal that brought Fabio Grosso to Inter for (€6.5M). Dellafiore managed seven appearances in his first season with the rosanero. He was then loaned to Torino for €100,000 (with option to purchase), where he had the opportunity to play more regularly, before being called back to Sicily in June 2008 (which Palermo paid Torino €400,000 to counter the buy option). Dellafiore signed a five-year contract during the 2008–09 season, but on 14 January 2009 turned back to Torino F.C. on loan for €400,000. After 6 months with Torino, Torino president Urbano Cairo announced that Dellafiore will play for Palermo for 2009–2010 after the team was relegated.

=== Parma (loan) ===
On 3 July 2009, Parma signed Dellafiore on loan from Palermo, for €250,000, with an option to sign half of the rights for €1.75 million. After the end of the season, Dellafiore returned to Sicily, but was later loaned out again to Parma on 20 August 2010, for free with an option to sign half of the rights for €400,000. He was sub-loaned to Cesena on 7 January 2011, for €200,000.

=== Parma & Novara ===
In August 2011, he was permanently transferred to Parma F.C., for free. In the same month, he moved to Serie A newcomers Novara Calcio for a peppercorn of €500, in co-ownership deal. In May 2012, Dellafiore returned to Internazionale for its Indonesia friendly tour on a 1-month loan. In June 2012 Dellafiore returned to Parma for €250,000, which also cost Parma an additional €200,000 as other fee.

=== Siena ===
In late June to 1 July 2012, Dellafiore was involved in 8-men swap with Siena, which saw Coppola, Dellafiore, Doumbia and Galuppo went to Siena, with Brandão, Pacini, Rossi and Iacobucci went to Parma. None of the new players actually played for Parma, only able to bring financial success to both clubs. (Note: In accounting, Siena received a notional selling profit on Rossi (€3,592,198), Iacobucci (€3,394,779), Pacini (€1M) and Brandão (€3,028,895) as well as on Parma side (selling profit on Coppola (€1,311,000), Doumbia (€968,800), Galuppo (€2.4 million) and Dellafiore €2.9 million.) The overall transaction made a zero net balance as well as a profit in terms of intangible assets increase, but would increase the amortization expense in the future seasons. (player contract was capitalized as a capital: intangible assets))

Dellafiore himself failed to play regularly for Siena in Serie A, only able to play twice before leaving for his first Serie B club Padova in temporary deal. At the end of the season, Siena was relegated, and Dellafiore followed the club for the new season.

Dellafiore made his best season with Siena in 2013–14 Serie B, in terms of total appearances of 35 Serie B games. At the end of the season, the co-ownership between Siena and Parma was renewed again, and Siena was expelled from Serie B due to financial difficulties. Dellafiore became a free agent soon after.

=== Latina ===
On 23 July 2014, Dellafiore was signed by Serie B club Latina along with former Siena team-mate Ângelo, Farelli and Valiani. He left the club in June 2017 after the club was relegated to Serie D for bankruptcy.

=== Perugia ===
On 12 January 2018, he was signed by Serie B club Perugia after six months of inactivity.

=== Paganese ===
On 5 February 2019, after sitting out another half-year without a club, he signed with Serie C club Paganese. He left the club by the end of the season.

In August 2019, he accepted to return to Palermo on trial, after the club was refounded and forced to restart from Serie D. He was, however, not offered a contract by the end of the pre-season training camp.

=== Mantova ===
Dellafiore ended up joining Serie D club Mantova on 6 December 2019, signing a deal until the end of the season.

== International career ==
Although born in Argentina, Dellafiore chose to represent Italy at an international level and was capped for Italian junior teams a few times.

He made his Italy U21 debut on 11 October 2005 against Moldova U21. He received his second cap for the Olympic team (de facto U21 team) at 2008 Toulon Tournament.
