= Abderrazzak Jadid =

Moroccan footballer

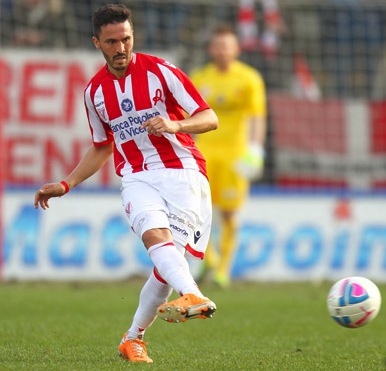

Personal information
- Date of birth: 1 June 1983 (age 43)
- Place of birth: Fkih Ben Saleh, Morocco
- Height: 1.75 m (5 ft 9 in)
- Position: Midfielder

Team information
- Current team: AC Rezzato
- Number: 77

Youth career
- Brescia

Senior career*
Years	Team	Apps	(Gls)
2000–2009	Brescia	43	(1)
2001–2002	→ Lumezzane (loan)	31	(3)
2005	→ Pisa (loan)	9	(1)
2005–2006	→ Pescara (loan)	29	(3)
2008	→ Bari (loan)	9	(1)
2009–2010	Salernitana	18	(1)
2010–2012	Parma	10	(0)
2010–2011	→ Eupen (loan)	27	(5)
2012	→ Grosseto (loan)	7	(0)
2012–2013	Grosseto	17	(1)
2013–2014	Vicenza	18	(4)
2014–2015	Cremonese	32	(9)
2015–2017	Virtus Entella	17	(1)
2017	Santarcangelo	7	(2)
2017–	AC Rezzato	5	(0)
- * Club domestic league appearances and goals as of 18 February 2018

Abderrazzak Jadid (Arabic: جديد عبدالرزاق; born 1 June 1983 in Fkih Ben Saleh) is a Moroccan former footballer who played as midfielder. He notedly played for Italian club AC Rezzato.

== Career ==
Jadid started his career on the youth team at Brescia. After playing on loan for Lumezzane of Serie C1, he made his debut on 15 September 2002, against Piacenza. In January 2005, he was loaned out again, this time to Pisa also in Serie C1.

In summer 2005, Jadid returned to Brescia, but at Serie B. He played only one match before being loaned to league rival Pescara.

Jadid returned to Brescia in the summer of 2006, but after playing just 6 games in the 2007–08 season he was loaned out again in January 2008 to league rival Bari. He returned to Brescia in July 2008, but has played only once in the 2008–09 season.

In October 2009, he signed a 2-year contract with Salernitana.
