= Alessandro Visone =

Italian footballer (born 1987)

Personal information
- Date of birth: 27 January 1987 (age 39)
- Place of birth: Novi Ligure, Italy
- Height: 1.83 m (6 ft 0 in)
- Position: Midfielder

Senior career*
Years	Team	Apps	(Gls)
2004–2005	Aprilia	1	(0)
2005–2007	Astrea	29	(1)
2007	Ostiamare	5	(0)
2007–2008	Massese	4	(0)
2008	Pescara	0	(0)
2008	Barletta	0	(0)
2008–2009	ASD Arrone Calcio	28	(4)
2009–2010	Arezzo	2	(0)
2010	→ Colligiana (loan)	12	(1)
2010–2011	Ravenna	4	(0)
2011	→ Viareggio (loan)	4	(0)
2011–2012	Vigor Lamezia	26	(3)
2012–2013	Aversa Normanna	18	(0)
2013	Arzachena		
2013–2014	Scafatese		
2014	Progreditur Marcianise	11	(0)
2014–2015	Aprilia	13	(1)
2015–2016	ASD Vis Artena		
2016	Cynthia		
2016–2017	Cassino		
2017	ASD Valle Del Tevere		
2017–2018	Anzio	12	(2)
2018–2019	FBC Gravina	19	(0)
2019–2020	Anzio		
2020–2021	US Academy Ladispoli		
2021	FAVL Cimini		
2021–2022	Aprilia CSP		
Total		187	(12)
- * Club domestic league appearances and goals

Alessandro Visone (born 27 January 1987) is an Italian former footballer who plays as a midfielder.

== Biography ==
=== Early career ===
Born in Novi Ligure, in the Province of Alessandria, Piedmont, Visone spent his early career in Serie D teams: Aprilia and Rome teams Astrea and Ostia Mare Lidocalcio.

=== Lega Pro teams ===
In July 2007 he was signed by Massese and on 4 January 2008 he was signed by Pescara. After no appearances, he was signed by Barletta. and in October left for Serie D team Arrone. In mid-2009 he was signed by Prima Divisione team Arezzo and in January 2010 loaned to Colligiana. After the bankrupt of Arezzo, he joined Ravenna in 1-year contract. He played 4 times in the league and played once in the cup. On 10 January 2011 he was exchanged with Sergio Carnesalini.

In July 2011 he was signed by Serie A team Parma and farmed to Vigor Lamezia on 24 July. The club did not announce it was a loan or a co-ownership deal.

=== Later career ===
In August 2016, Visone joined Cassino. He later had spells at ASD Valle del Tevere, ASD Anzio Calcio 1924 and FBC Gravina, before returning to ASD Anzio Calcio 1924 again in September 2019.
