= Lorenzo Galassi =

Italian footballer

Personal information
- Date of birth: 31 May 1991 (age 35)
- Place of birth: Busto Arsizio, Italy
- Position: Midfielder

Youth career
- Parma

Senior career*
Years	Team	Apps	(Gls)
2011–2016	Novara	2	(0)
2011–2012	→ Pavia (loan)	13	(0)
2012–2013	→ Mantova (loan)	28	(2)
2013–2014	→ Viareggio (loan)	27	(1)
2015–2016	→ Olhanense (loan)	56	(13)
2016–2017	Olhanense	25	(6)

International career
2006–2007	Italy U16	13	(0)
2007–2008	Italy U17	6	(0)
2008–2009	Italy U18	1	(0)
- * Club domestic league appearances and goals as of 3 March 2017

Lorenzo Galassi (born 31 May 1991) is an Italian footballer who currently is on a free agent.

== Biography ==
Born in Busto Arsizio, Lombardy, Galassi started his career at Emilia club Parma.

=== Novara ===
In May 2011 Galassi joined fellow Serie A club Novara Calcio on free transfer. On 31 July 2011 Galassi and Daniele Francesca were signed by Lega Pro Prima Divisione club A.C. Pavia in co-ownership deal and temporary deal respectively. On 22 June 2012 Galassi returned to Piedmont. On 27 August 2012 Galassi left for Mantova F.C. On 29 August 2013 Galassi was signed by Viareggio along with Andrea Peverelli.

On 31 January 2015 he was signed by Portuguese club Olhanense in another temporary deal. Galassi made 2 appearances only in 2014–15 Lega Pro.

=== International career ===
Born in Italy, Galassi is of Dominican descent. Galassi was an active member of Italy youth national teams. He played 13 times in 2006–07 season, including international Val-de-Marne tournament. He played twice for U17 team in 2008 UEFA European Under-17 Football Championship elite qualification, sharing the starting defender role with Davide Faraoni. He also played 4 friendlies in 2007–08, excluding 2008 Minsk under-17 International Tournament, which no line-ups were documented. He played his first and last U18 cap on 14 January 2009, against Denmark, as the substitute of Max Taddei. He participated in a training camp for U18 team in November 2008.
