= Gonçalo Brandão =

Portuguese footballer (born 1986)

Personal information
- Full name: Gonçalo Jardim Brandão
- Date of birth: 9 October 1986 (age 40)
- Place of birth: Lisbon, Portugal
- Height: 1.82 m (6 ft 0 in)
- Position: Defender

Team information
- Current team: Belenenses (manager)

Youth career
- 1994–2004: Belenenses

Senior career*
Years	Team	Apps	(Gls)
2003–2008	Belenenses	19	(1)
2005–2006	→ Charlton Athletic (loan)	0	(0)
2008–2011	Siena	43	(0)
2011–2014	Parma	2	(0)
2012–2013	→ Cesena (loan)	23	(0)
2013–2014	→ CFR Cluj (loan)	1	(0)
2014	→ Belenenses (loan)	9	(0)
2014–2017	Belenenses	70	(1)
2017–2018	Estoril	10	(0)
2018–2019	Lausanne-Sport	23	(1)
2019–2021	Porto B	22	(0)
Total		222	(3)

International career
2001–2002	Portugal U16	3	(0)
2002–2003	Portugal U17	10	(1)
2004–2005	Portugal U19	12	(0)
2007	Portugal U20	3	(0)
2007–2008	Portugal U21	9	(0)
2009	Portugal U23	1	(0)
2009	Portugal	2	(0)

Managerial career
- 2021–2024: Sporting CP B (assistant)
- 2024: Casa Pia (assistant)
- 2025–2026: Casa Pia (interim)
- 2026–: Belenenses
- * Club domestic league appearances and goals

Gonçalo Jardim Brandão (born 9 October 1986) is a Portuguese former professional footballer who played mainly a central defender but also as a left-back. He is currently manager of Liga 3 club Belenenses.

== Club career ==
=== Belenenses ===
A product of hometown C.F. Os Belenenses' academy, Lisbon-born Brandão scored in his second match in the Primeira Liga aged 17, against FC Porto in a 1–4 home loss on 18 October 2003 when he still had not finished his youth career. He only managed another seven first-team appearances over the next three seasons, with a loan to Charlton Athletic in 2005–06 in between (no Premier League appearances).

Brandão played his first league match after his Belenenses return on 4 February 2007, in a 1–0 away win over Vitória F.C. where he started.

=== Siena ===
In June 2008, it was announced Brandão had signed a four-year contract with Serie A's AC Siena. After a shaky start – he only made his league debut on 20 December in a 1–2 home defeat to Inter Milan– he finished his first season as a starter.

After the end of the 2009–10 campaign, Brandão was loaned to Juventus FC for the United States tour along with Albin Ekdal (owned by Juve and loaned to Siena) and three other players.

=== Parma ===
On 22 June 2011, after contributing only two games to Siena's top-flight return, Brandão signed for Parma FC on loan. In the following summer, the clubs were involved in a player-only transaction which saw Parma sign Brandão, Alessandro Iacobucci, Giuseppe Pacini and Andrea Rossi, while Siena acquired Manuel Coppola, Paolo Hernán Dellafiore, Abdou Doumbia and Alberto Galuppo – both organisations also retained 50% registration rights on their players.

Brandão left for Serie B club AC Cesena on 7 July 2012, as Marco Parolo moved to Parma in a temporary deal for €1 million, with the latter side also being responsible of €1.8 million in wages. In the ensuing off-season, still owned by both Parma and Siena, he signed for Romanian club CFR Cluj along with Denilson Gabionetta.

=== Belenenses return ===
On 6 January 2014, Brandão returned to Portugal and Belenenses in a temporary deal. On 20 June he was sold back to Siena, with Galuppo returning to Parma. However, the Italians declared their liquidation on 15 July as the club did not meet the financial requirements for the upcoming season, and the player re-joined Belenenses as a free agent.

Subsequently, Brandão represented G.D. Estoril Praia (Portuguese top division) and FC Lausanne-Sport (Swiss Challenge League). He scored his only goal for the latter on 21 September 2018, in a 1–1 home draw with FC Aarau.

Brandão retired at the end of the 2020–21 campaign aged 34, as a member of Porto B.

== International career ==
After having represented Portugal at almost every youth level, including the under-21s, Brandão made his debut for the full side on 31 March 2009, appearing as a left-back in a 2–0 friendly victory against South Africa in Lausanne, Switzerland.

== Coaching career ==
After retiring, Brandão worked as assistant coach at Sporting CP B and Casa Pia AC. On 6 November 2025, he replaced João Pereira at the helm of the latter in the top tier, on an interim basis. On his debut three days later, he oversaw a 2–2 away draw against S.L. Benfica.

On 8 January 2026, Brandão was dismissed and replaced by Álvaro Pacheco.

== Career statistics ==
As of 14 May 2016

Club	Season	League			Cup		Continental		Total	
Club	Season	Division	Apps	Goals	Apps	Goals	Apps	Goals	Apps	Goals
Belenenses	2003–04	Primeira Liga	12	1	2	0	—		14	1
Belenenses	2004–05	Primeira Liga	4	0	2	0	—		6	1
Belenenses	2006–07	Primeira Liga	1	0	0	0	—		1	0
Belenenses	2007–08	Primeira Liga	2	0	2	0	0	0	4	0
Belenenses	Total		19	1	6	0	0	0	25	1
Charlton Athletic (loan)	2005–06	Premier League	0	0	0	0	—		0	0
Siena	2008–09	Serie A	20	0	0	0	—		20	0
Siena	2009–10	Serie A	21	0	1	0	—		22	0
Siena	2010–11	Serie B	2	0	0	0	—		2	0
Siena	Total		43	0	1	0	—		44	0
Parma	2011–12	Serie A	2	0	0	0	—		2	0
Cesena (loan)	2012–13	Serie A	23	0	2	0	—		25	0
CFR Cluj (loan)	2013–14	Liga I	1	0	0	0	—		1	0
Belenenses (loan)	2013–14	Primeira Liga	9	0	2	0	—		11	0
Belenenses	2014–15	Primeira Liga	29	0	5	0	—		34	0
Belenenses	2015–16	Primeira Liga	29	1	1	0	9 (Note: Appearances in UEFA Europa League)	0	39	1
Belenenses	Total		67	1	8	0	9	0	84	1
Career total			155	2	17	0	9	0	181	2
