= Gianluca Musacci =

Italian footballer

Personal information
- Date of birth: 1 April 1987 (age 39)
- Place of birth: Viareggio, Italy
- Height: 1.81 m (5 ft 11 in)
- Position: Midfielder

Youth career
- 2006–2007: Empoli

Senior career*
Years	Team	Apps	(Gls)
2006–2012	Empoli	75	(5)
2008	→ Massese (loan)	20	(0)
2011–2012	→ Parma (loan)	15	(0)
2012–2015	Parma	6	(0)
2013	→ Spezia (loan)	10	(0)
2013–2014	→ Padova (loan)	16	(2)
2014	→ Frosinone (loan)	15	(0)
2015	→ Pro Vercelli (loan)	11	(0)
2015–2016	Catania	21	(1)
2016–2017	Messina	31	(1)
2017–2018	Viterbese	13	(0)
2018	Paganese	0	(0)
2019–2020	Real Forte	11	(1)
2020–2021	ASD Tau Calcio Altopascio		
Total		244	(10)

International career
2007	Italy U20	2	(0)
- * Club domestic league appearances and goals

Gianluca Musacci (born 1 April 1987) is an Italian former professional footballer who plays as a midfielder.

== Career ==
=== Empoli ===
Born in Viareggio, Tuscany, Musacci started his career at Tuscan club Empoli. During the 2010–11 season, he often partnered with Davide Moro and/or Mirko Valdifiori in a 3 (or 2)-man midfield, in a defensive midfield role.

==== Parma and Spezia loans ====
Musacci moved on loan to Parma for €300,000 in August 2011 (with an option to purchase) and secured a permanent deal in a co-ownership arrangement in July 2012 in 5-year contract, for €400,000 transfer fee. In January 2013 Parma signed Musacci outright for another €500,000. (Note: The extra €100,000 was reflected as oneri da compartecipazioni on Parma side and proventi da compartecipazioni on Empoli side) He was immediately loaned to Spezia for €400,000, with Spezia receiving payment in the form of €200,000 (Italian: premi di valorizzazione) from Parma at the end of season.

==== Padova and Frosinone loans ====
On 7 August 2013 he was signed by Serie B club Calcio Padova in temporary deal. On 21 August 2014 he was signed by Frosinone.

=== Paganese ===
On 19 July 2018, he signed a two-year contract with Serie C club Paganese. On 2 November 2018, he was released from his contract by mutual consent.
