= Valenzana Mado =

Italian football club

- Full name: Valenzana Mado Società Sportiva Dilettantistica
- Founded: 1906; 120 years ago as, Unione Sportiva Valenzana; 1958; 68 years ago as, Unione Sportiva Valenzana Fulvius (merged); 1962; 64 years ago as, Unione Sportiva Valenzana; 2001; 25 years ago as, Valenzana Calcio; 2012; 14 years ago as, Valenzana Mado Società Sportiva Dilettantistica (merged)
- Ground: Stadio Comunale di Valenza, Valenza, Italy
- Capacity: 2,200
- Chairman: Don Abele Belloli
- Manager: Luca Pellegrini
- League: Serie D
- 2025–26: Serie D/A, 8th
| Home colours | Away colours |

Valenzana Mado SSD is an Italian football club, based in Valenza, Piedmont. It currently plays in Serie D.

== History ==
=== Valenzana Mado ===
The club was founded in 2012 after the merger of Valenzana Calcio and G.S. Mado. It renounces to Serie D for strong financial commitment required, to start instead from Eccellenza.

=== Before the merger ===
==== Valenzana ====
Former Valenzana logo

Valenzana Calcio was founded in 1906.

In the season 2011–12 after 12 seasons in Lega Pro Seconda Divisione it was relegated to Serie D.

Alberto Omodeo has been for 20 years the historic President of the club.

==== Mado ====
G.S. Mado was founded in 2002. The club in the season 2011–12 has played in Prima Categoria Alessandria. Very numerous, his youth sector was made up of about 200 boys.

== Colors and badge ==
The team's colors are dark blue and red.
