= List of Italian football transfers summer 2009 (August) =

Here is the part2 of the list of Italian football transfers summer 2009.

== Summer transfer window (August) ==
Date	Name	Nat	Moving from	Moving to	Fee
1 August 2009	Stefano Pietribiasi	Italy	Sambenedettese	Vicenza	Free
2009-08-01	Claudio Cafiero	Italy	Roma	San Marino	Loan
2009-08-01	Giacomo Di Donato	Italy	Vicenza	Valenzana	Loan
2009-08-01	Vladislav Mirchev	Bulgaria	(Bulgaria) Spartak Varna	Ancona	Undisclosed
2009-08-03	Rodrigue Boisfer	France	Genoa	Gubbio	Loan
2009-08-03	Andrea Soncin	Italy	Ascoli	Padova	Undisclosed
2009-08-03	Fabiano	Brazil	Genoa	Vicenza	Loan
2009-08-03	Frank Feltscher	Switzerland	Lecce	(Switzerland) Bellinzona	Undisclosed
2009-08-03	Thomas Job	Cameroon	Pisa	Grosseto	Free
2009-08-03	Diego Rodríguez Da Luz	Uruguay	Bologna	(Argentina) Huracán	Undisclosed
2009-08-04	Andrea De Falco	Italy	Chievo	Ancona	Loan
2009-08-04	Miguel Layún	Mexico	(Mexico) Veracruz	Atalanta	Undisclosed
2009-08-04	Giovanni Bartolucci	Italy	Siena	Lecco	Loan
2009-08-04	Gianluca Litteri	Italy	Internazionale	Vicenza	Loan
2009-08-04	Edoardo Pazzagli	Italy	Fiorentina	Andria	Loan
2009-08-04	Samuele Olivi	Italy	Piacenza	Pescara	Undisclosed
2009-08-04	Mark Orosz	Hungary	Crotone	Arezzo	Undisclosed
2009-08-04	Andrea Paolucci	Italy	Fiorentina	Andria	Loan
2009-08-05	Filippo Fracaro	Italy	Internazionale (youth)	Chievo (youth)	Free
2009-08-05	Francesco D'Ascanio	Italy	Internazionale (youth)	Chievo (youth)	Undisclosed
2009-08-05	Davide Tonani	Italy	Internazionale (youth)	Chievo (youth)	Loan
2009-08-05	Edile Micheletti Awoh	Italy	Internazionale (youth)	Chievo (youth)	Loan
2009-08-05	Giuseppe Lolaico	Italy	Rimini	Potenza	Undisclosed
2009-08-05	Andrea Rossini	Italy	Cesena	Foligno	Co-ownership, €500
2009-08-05	Nicola Ravaglia	Italy	Cesena	Viareggio	Co-ownership, Undisclosed
2009-08-05	Marco Amelia	Italy	Palermo	Genoa	€5M (swap with Rubinho)
2009-08-05	Rubinho	Brazil	Genoa	Palermo	€5M (swap with Amelia)
2009-08-05	Walter Alberto López	Uruguay	(Uruguay) Cerro	Brescia	Loan
2009-08-05	Massimo Volta	Italy	Sampdoria	Cesena	Loan
2009-08-05	Julián Magallanes	Argentina	Vicenza	Taranto	Loan
2009-08-05	Simone Calori	Italy	Vicenza	Taranto	Loan
2009-08-05	Maurizio Franchi	Italy	Fiorentina	Pontedera	Loan
2009-08-05	Matteo Bacciosi	Italy	Fiorentina	Pontedera	Loan
2009-08-05	Giuseppe Cozzolino	Italy	Lecce	Como	Undisclosed
5 August 2009	Lorenzo Lollo	Italy	Fiorentina (youth)	Spezia	Loan
5 August 2009	Rocco Visibelli	Italy	Fiorentina (youth)	Colligiana (youth)	Loan
2009-08-05	Andrea Offredi	Italy	AlbinoLeffe	Prato	Loan
2009-08-05	Alessandro Salvi	Italy	AlbinoLeffe	Prato	Loan
2009-08-06	Mattia Masiero	Italy	Torino	Pro Patria	Undisclosed
2009-08-06	Davide Raffaello	Italy	Ascoli	Isola Liri	Undisclosed
2009-08-06	Marco Sperati	Italy	Lazio	Isola Liri	Undisclosed
2009-08-06	Yobie Bassoule	Italy	Juventus	Isola Liri	
2009-08-06	Luca Lagnese	Italy	Juventus	Isola Liri	
2009-08-06	Federico Mirarchi	Italy	Juventus	Isola Liri	
2009-08-06	Leonardo Blanchard	Italy	Siena	Valle del Giovenco	Loan
2009-08-06	Marko Arnautović	Austria	(Netherlands) Twente	Internazionale	Loan
2009-08-06	Federico Raúl Laurito	Argentina	Udinese	(Argentina) Huracán	Loan
2009-08-06	Adrián Ricchiuti	Argentina	Rimini	Catania	Undisclosed
2009-08-06	Martín Cáceres	Uruguay	(Spain) Barcelona	Juventus	Loan
2009-08-06	Simone Barone	Italy	Torino	Cagliari	Undisclosed
2009-08-06	Lorenzo Tafi	Italy	Fiorentina	Gavorrano	Loan
2009-08-06	Filippo Di Prete	Italy	Fiorentina	Chieti	Loan
2009-08-06	Massimo Loviso	Italy	Livorno	Torino	Co-ownership, Undisclosed
2009-08-06	Nicola Beati	Italy	Arezzo	Crotone	Undisclsoed
2009-08-06	Luis Maria Alfageme	Argentina	Brescia	Grosseto	Co-ownership, €500
2009-08-06	Filipe Machado	Brazil	(Bulgaria) CSKA Sofia	Salernitana	Free
6 August 2009	Nicolò Perna	Italy	Catania (youth)	Vibonese	Co-ownership, Undisclosed
2009-08-07	Matteo Bonatti	Italy	Empoli	Lumezzane	Co-ownership, Undisclosed
2009-08-07	Nicolò Brighenti	Italy	Triestina	Pergocrema	Loan
2009-08-07	Giovanni Kyeremateng	Italy	Internazionale	Monza	Free
2009-08-07	Paolo Campinoti	Italy	Internazionale	Monza	Free
2009-08-07	Domenico Maiese	Italy	Internazionale (youth)	Monza (youth)	Free
2009-08-07	Niccolò Scaccabarozzi	Italy	Internazionale (youth)	Monza (youth)	Free
2009-08-07	Mirko Santoro	Italy	Internazionale (youth)	Monza (youth)	Free
2009-08-07	Stefano Tresoldi	Italy	Internazionale (youth)	Monza (youth)	Free
2009-08-07	Gioele Mureno	Italy	Internazionale (youth)	Monza (youth)	Undisclosed
2009-08-07	Francesco Poltero	Italy	Internazionale (youth)	Monza (youth)	Undisclosed
2009-08-07	Luca D'Errico	Italy	Internazionale (youth)	Monza (youth)	Free
2009-08-07	Gianluca Pozzi	Italy	Internazionale (youth)	Monza (youth)	Free
2009-08-06	Alessandro Bastrini	Italy	Sampdoria	Salernitana	Loan
2009-08-07	Roberto Cortellini	Italy	Cesena	Modena	Undisclsoed
2009-08-07	Ayub Daud	Somalia	Juventus	Crotone	Loan
2009-08-07	Klaas-Jan Huntelaar	Netherlands	(Spain) Real Madrid	Milan	Undisclosed
2009-08-07	Mario Brkljača	Croatia	(Croatia) Hajduk Split	Cagliari	Loan
2009-08-07	Mohammed Rabiu	Ghana	(Ghana) Liberty Professionals	Sampdoria	Loan
2009-08-07	Ferdinando Sforzini	Italy	Udinese	Bari	Loan
2009-08-07	Alberto Aquilani	Italy	Roma	(England) Liverpool	€20M + bonus
2009-08-07	Dorin Goian	Romania	(Romania) Steaua	Palermo	€2.095M
7 August 2009	Antonio Giosa	Italy	Reggina	Vicenza	Free
7 August 2009	Francesco Signori	Italy	Sampdoria	Vicenza	Loan
2009-08-07	Cesare Rickler	Italy	Chievo	Modena	Loan
2009-08-07	Domenico Girardi	Italy	Chievo	Modena	Loan
2009-08-07	Pape Moussa Diakhate	Senegal	Fiorentina	(Belgium) Eupen	Loan
8 August 2009	Enrico Fantini	Italy	Modena	Alessandria	Free
2009-08-08	Fabio Mazzeo	Italy	Perugia	Frosinone	Loan
2009-08-08	Marco Martini	Italy	Frosinone	Perugia	Undisclosed
2009-08-08	Massimo Perra	Italy	Frosinone	Perugia	Undisclosed
2009-08-10	Christian Scarlato	Italy	Pomigliano	Grosseto	Free
2009-08-10	Cristiano Zanetti	Italy	Juventus	Fiorentina	€2M
2009-08-10	Samuele Dalla Bona	Italy	Napoli	(Greece) Iraklis	Loan
2009-08-10	Jefferson	Brazil	Fiorentina	Frosinone	Loan
2009-08-10	Rafael Santos	Brazil	(Brazil) Atlético Paranaense	Bologna	Loan
2009-08-10	Antonio Mazzotta	Italy	Palermo	Lecce	Loan
2009-08-10	Denis Tonucci	Italy	Cesena	Piacenza	Loan
2009-08-10	Andrea Signorini	Italy	Genoa	Alessandria	Loan
2009-08-11	Antonio Croce	Italy	Padova	Cassino	Loan
2009-08-11	Mattia Piras	Italy	Pergocrema (youth)	Genoa (youth)	Co-ownership, €100,000
2009-08-11	Manuel Iori	Italy	Cittadella	Chievo	Co-ownership, Undisclosed
2009-08-11	Christian Amoroso	Italy	Bologna	Ascoli	Undisclosed
2009-08-11	Carlo Luisi	Italy	Ascoli	Modena	Undisclosed
2009-08-11	Matteo Camillini	Italy	Ascoli	Ternana	Co-ownership, €500
2009-08-11	Filippo Sambugaro	Italy	Pergocrema	Piacenza	Loan
2009-07-11	Massimo Melucci	Italy	Ascoli	Grosseto	Free
2009-08-12	Alessandro Crescenzi	Italy	Roma	Grosseto	Loan
2009-08-12	Gaetano Capogrosso	Italy	Siena	Piacenza	Loan
2009-08-12	Federico Moretti	Italy	Parma	Catania	Undisclosed
2009-08-12	Flavio Roma	Italy	(France) AS Monaco	Milan	€2.558M
2009-08-12	Francesco Benussi	Italy	Lecce	Livorno	Loan
2009-08-12	Michael Cardinali	Italy	Fiorentina	Chieti	Loan
2009-08-12	Dimas	Brazil	Sambonifacese	Chievo	Free
2009-08-13	Sebastiano Girelli	Italy	Sassuolo	Reggiana	Loan
2009-08-13	Pedro Oliveira	Portugal	Modena	Arezzo	Free
2009-08-13	Anthony Vanden Borre	Belgium	Genoa	(England) Portsmouth	Loan
2009-08-13	Bryan Bergougnoux	France	(France) Toulouse	Lecce	Free
2009-08-13	Carlo Camilli	Italy	Colligiana	Ascoli	Undisclosed
2009-08-14	Georgian Liviu Berdeanu	Romania	Virtus Lanciano	Frosinone	Undisclosed
2009-08-14	Emil Hallfreðsson	Iceland	Reggina	(England) Barnsley	Loan
14 August 2009	Simone Cavalli	Italy	Bari	Mantova	Loan
2009-08-16	Carmine Coppola	Italy	Salernitana	Arezzo	Free
2009-08-17	Fabrizio Grillo	Italy	Arezzo	Crotone	Loan
2009-08-17	Jan Koprivec	Slovenia	Udinese	Gallipoli	Loan
2009-08-17	Piergiuseppe Maritato	Italy	Fiorentina	Gallipoli	Loan
2009-08-17	Massimiliano Tagliani	Italy	Fiorentina	Gallipoli	Loan
2009-08-17	Alex Pederzoli	Italy	Padova	Gallipoli	Undisclosed
2009-08-17	Francesco Bolzoni	Italy	Genoa	Frosinone	Loan, €0.2M
2009-08-17	Mato Jajalo	Croatia	(Croatia) Slaven Belupo	Siena	Undisclosed
2009-08-17	Davide Moro	Italy	Empoli	Livorno	Loan
2009-08-17	Parfait Louis Essengue Eloumou	Cameroon	Genoa	Piacenza	Loan
2009-08-17	Paolo Vignali	Italy	Piacenza	Carpenedolo	Co-ownership, Undisclosed
2009-08-18	Vito Falconieri	Italy	Ascoli	Taranto	Loan
2009-08-18	Nikola Gulan	Serbia	Fiorentina	Empoli	Loan
2009-08-18	Cristian Melinte	Romania	(Romania) Dinamo București	Palermo	Free
2009-08-18	Marco Veronese	Italy	Cesena	Lecco	Free
2009-08-19	Franco Semioli	Italy	Fiorentina	Sampdoria	Undisclosed
2009-08-19	Samuel Di Carmine	Italy	Fiorentina	Gallipoli	Loan
2009-08-19	Giacomo Fei	Italy	Fiorentina	Sangiovannese	Loan
2009-08-19	Emanuele Terranova	Italy	Palermo	Lecce	Loan
2009-08-19	Matteo Abbate	Italy	Piacenza	Gallipoli	Undisclosed
2009-08-19	Francesco Dimida	Italy	Bari	Gallipoli	Undisclosed
2009-08-19	Manuel Mancini	Italy	Siena	Gallipoli	Loan
2009-08-19	Davide Mandorlini	Italy	Venezia	Gallipoli	Free
2009-08-19	Alessandro Moro	Italy	Treviso	Gallipoli	Free
2009-08-19	William Pianu	Italy	Treviso	Gallipoli	Free
2009-08-19	Cristian Sosa	Uruguay	(Uruguay) Defensor	Gallipoli	Loan
2009-08-19	Agustín Viana	Uruguay	(Romania) Cluj	Gallipoli	Undisclosed
2009-08-19	Ionuţ Radu	Romania	Potenza	Chievo	Undisclosed
2009-08-19	Karim Laribi	Italy	(England) Fulham	Palermo	Free
2009-08-19	Daniele Portanova	Italy	Siena	Bologna	Undisclosed (player exchange)
2009-08-19	Claudio Terzi	Italy	Bologna	Siena	€2.5M (player exchange)
2009-08-19	Mirko Antenucci	Italy	Catania	Ascoli	Loan
2009-08-19	Libor Kozák	Czech Republic	Lazio	Brescia	Loan
2009-08-19	Luca Giunchi	Italy	Celano Olimpia	Cesena	Undisclosed
19 August 2009	Keivan Zarineh	Iran	Roma	Paganese	Loan
2009-08-20	Leandro Caruso	Argentina	Udinese	(Argentina) Vélez	Loan
2009-08-20	Ritchie Kitoko	Belgium	(Spain) Albacete	Udinese	Undisclosed
2009-08-20	Daniele Capelli	Italy	Atalanta	Reggina	Co-ownership, Undisclosed
2009-08-20	Fabio Ceravolo	Italy	Reggina	Atalanta	Loan
2009-08-20	Sergio Almirón	Argentina	Juventus	Bari	Loan
2009-08-20	Edgar Çani	Albania	Palermo	Padova	Loan
2009-08-20	Aleandro Rosi	Italy	Roma	Siena	Co-ownership, €1.2M
2009-08-20	Simone Bonomi	Italy	Bari	Perugia	Undisclosed
2009-08-20	Carlos Matheu	Argentina	Cagliari	(Argentina) Independiente	Undisclosed
2009-08-20	Nicolás Navarro	Argentina	Napoli	(Argentina) River Plate	Loan
2009-08-21	Juri Toppan	Italy	Internazionale	Villacidrese	Loan
2009-08-21	Matteo Lombardo	Italy	Internazionale	Villacidrese	Loan
2009-08-21	Marcelo Zalayeta	Uruguay	Napoli	Bologna	Loan
2009-08-21	Luigi Vitale	Italy	Napoli	Livorno	Loan
2009-08-21	Leon Črnčič	Slovenia	(Slovenia) Aluminij	Atalanta	Loan
2009-08-21	Alessandro De Vitis	Italy	Fiorentina	Parma (youth)	Undisclosed
21 August 2009	Pietro De Giorgio	Italy	Perugia	Empoli	Undisclosed
2009-08-22	Nicolás Burdisso	Argentina	Internazionale	Roma	Loan
2009-08-22	Odion Ighalo	Nigeria	Udinese	(Spain) Granada	Loan
2009-08-22	Giuseppe Abruzzese	Italy	Grosseto	Crotone	Undisclosed
23 August 2009	Fabio Virgili	Italy	Parma	Sporting Terni (amateur)	Free
2009-08-24	Giovanni Passiglia	Italy	Vicenza	Pro Patria	Loan
2009-08-24	Matteo Serafini	Italy	Vicenza	Pro Patria	Undisclosed
2009-08-24	Orlando Urbano	Italy	Pro Patria	Vicenza	Undisclosed
2009-08-24	Kelvin Ewome Matute	Cameroon	Udinese	Cesena	Loan
2009-08-24	Nello Russo	Italy	Crotone	Monza	Free
2009-08-25	Nicolò De Cesare	Italy	Internazionale	Mezzocorona	Undisclosed
2009-08-25	Francesco Virdis	Italy	Sampdoria	Foligno	Loan
2009-08-25	Paolo Sammarco	Italy	Sampdoria	Udinese	Loan
2009-08-25	Mattia Mustacchio	Italy	Sampdoria	Ancona	Loan
2009-08-25	Iago Falqué	Spain	Juventus	Bari	Loan
2009-08-25	Francesco Flachi	Italy	Empoli	Brescia	Free
2009-08-25	Luca Ricci	Italy	Cesena	Pavia	Loan
2009-08-25	Andrea Zanigni	Italy	Cesena	Noceto	Loan
2009-08-25	Filippo Spitoni	Italy	Andria	Bologna	Free
2009-08-25	Massimiliano Scaglia	Italy	Treviso	Gallipoli	Free
2009-08-25	Leandro De Petris	Argentina	(Argentina) Independiente	Gallipoli	Undisclosed
2009-08-26	Vlado Šmit	Serbia	Treviso	Gallipoli	Free
2009-08-26	Daniel Bombardieri	Italy	AlbinoLeffe	Pro Sesto	Loan
2009-08-26	Lorenzo De Silvestri	Italy	Lazio	Fiorentina	Undisclosed
2009-08-26	Zdeněk Zlámal	Czech Republic	(Czech Republic) Slovan Liberec	Udinese	Undisclosed
2009-08-26	Zdeněk Zlámal	Czech Republic	Udinese	(Spain) Cádiz	Loan
2009-08-26	Victor Obinna	Nigeria	Internazionale	(Spain) Málaga	Loan
2009-08-26	Valerio Virga	Italy	Roma	Cosenza	Loan
2009-08-26	Isah Eliakwu	Nigeria	Triestina	Gallipoli	Free
2009-08-26	Matias Garavano	Argentina	(Spain) Mérida	Gallipoli	Free
2009-08-27	Giacomo Tulli	Italy	Vicenza	Rimini	Loan
2009-08-27	Mohammed Gulraiz	Algeria	Udinese	(Spain) Granada	Loan
2009-08-27	Massimo Donati	Italy	(Scotland) Celtic	Bari	Undisclosed
2009-08-27	Mozart	Brazil	(Brazil) Palmeiras	Livorno	Undisclosed
2009-08-27	Nelson Rivas	Colombia	Internazionale	Livorno	Loan
2009-08-27	Marco Moro	Italy	Ascoli	Spezia	Loan
2009-08-27	Angelo Siniscalchi	Italy	Ascoli	Portogruaro	Loan
2009-08-27	Rincón	Brazil	Internazionale	Piacenza	Loan
2009-08-27	Guido Marilungo	Italy	Sampdoria	Lecce	Loan
2009-08-27	Manuel Nocciolini	Italy	Fiorentina	Pisa	Loan
2009-08-27	Paolo Pincio	Italy	Fiorentina	Rosignano	Loan
2009-08-27	Dimas	Brazil	Chievo	Monza	Loan
2009-08-27	Fabrizio Anselmi	Italy	Sassuolo	Verona	Undisclosed
2009-08-27	Ettore Mendicino	Italy	Lazio	Crotone	Loan
2009-08-27	Maximiliano Uggè	Italy	Internazionale (youth)	Triestina (youth)	Loan
2009-08-27	Daniele Corvia	Italy	Siena	Lecce	Undisclosed
2009-08-28	Francesco Lodi	Italy	Empoli	Udinese	Loan
2009-08-28	Andrea Mazzarani	Italy	Udinese	Crotone	Loan
2009-08-28	Wesley Sneijder	Netherlands	(Spain) Real Madrid	Internazionale	Undisclosed
2009-08-28	Daniele Cacia	Italy	Lecce	Reggina	Loan
2009-08-28	Alessandro Diamanti	Italy	Livorno	(England) West Ham United	Undisclosed
2009-08-28	Nicola Amoruso	Italy	Torino	Parma	Undisclosed
2009-08-28	Julio César de León	Honduras	Parma	Torino	Loan
2009-08-28	Manuel Coppola	Italy	Parma	Torino	Loan
2009-08-29	Wilker	Brazil	Treviso	Genoa	Free
2009-08-29	Andrea Catellani	Italy	Catania	Modena	Loan
2009-08-29	Christian Iannelli	Italy	Catania	Nocerina	Loan
2009-08-29	Fabián Orellana	Chile	Udinese	(Spain) Xerez	Loan
2009-08-29	Cristian Zaccardo	Italy	(Germany) Wolfsburg	Parma	Undisclosed
2009-08-30	Bruno Fornaroli	Uruguay	Sampdoria	(Spain) Recreativo	Loan
2009-08-30	Magnus Troest	Denmark	Genoa	(Spain) Recreativo	Loan
2009-08-31	Manuele Blasi	Italy	Napoli	Palermo	Loan
2009-08-31	Elvis Abbruscato	Italy	Torino	Chievo	Loan
2009-08-31	Felice Piccolo	Italy	Empoli	Chievo	Loan
2009-08-31	Angelo Antonazzo	Italy	Chievo	Empoli	Loan
2009-08-31	Simone Grippo	Switzerland	Chievo	Lumezzane	Loan
2009-08-31	Ivan Pelizzoli	Italy	(Russia) Lokomotiv Moscow	AlbinoLeffe	Loan
2009-08-31	Paolo Grossi	Italy	Varese	AlbinoLeffe	Co-ownership, €180,000
2009-08-31	Julián Di Cosmo	Argentina	Catania	Colligiana	Undisclosed
2009-08-31	Simone Pesce	Italy	Ascoli	Catania	Co-ownership, €500
2009-08-31	Blerim Džemaili	Switzerland	Torino	Parma	Loan
2009-08-31	Daniele Vantaggiato	Italy	Parma	Torino	Loan
2009-08-31	Henry Damián Giménez	Uruguay	(Uruguay) River Plate de Montevideo	Bologna	Loan
2009-08-31	Richard Porta	Uruguay	Siena	(Uruguay) River Plate de Montevideo	Loan
2009-08-31	Fabio Grosso	Italy	(France) Lyon	Juventus	€2M + bonus
2009-08-31	Ibrahim Maaroufi	Morocco	Vicenza	(Switzerland) Bellinzona	Free
2009-08-31	Savio Nsereko	Germany	(England) West Ham United	Fiorentina	Co-ownership, Undisclosed
2009-08-31	Manuel Da Costa	Portugal	Fiorentina	(England) West Ham United	Undisclosed
2009-08-31	Zdravko Kuzmanović	Serbia	Fiorentina	(Germany) Stuttgart	Undisclosed
2009-08-31	Bogdan Lobonţ	Romania	(Romania) Dinamo București	Roma	Loan
2009-08-31	Fabio Zamblera	Italy	(England) Newcastle United	Roma	Loan
2009-08-31	Giovanni Marchese	Italy	Chievo	Catania	Loan
2009-08-31	Gennaro Sardo	Italy	Catania	Chievo	Loan
2009-08-31	Filippo Carobbio	Italy	Bari	Grosseto	Loan
2009-08-31	Andrea Carozza	Italy	Bari	Barletta	Undisclosed
2009-08-31	Corrado Colombo	Italy	Bari	Verona	Undisclosed
2009-08-31	Lucas Correa	Argentina	Lazio	Taranto	Loan, €100,000
2009-08-31	Manuel Belleri	Italy	Lazio	Lecce	Free
2009-08-31	Digão	Brazil	Milan	Lecce	Loan
2009-08-31	Souleymane Diamoutene	Mali	Lecce	Bari	Loan
2009-08-31	Tommaso Chiecchi	Italy	Chievo	Pro Patria	Loan
2009-08-31	Daniele Dessena	Italy	Sampdoria	Cagliari	Loan
2009-08-31	Piermario Morosini	Italy	Udinese	Reggina	Loan
2009-08-31	Sodinha	Brazil	Udinese	Portogruaro	Loan
2009-08-31	Massimo Gotti	Italy	Udinese	Portogruaro	Loan
2009-08-31	Schumacher	Brazil	Udinese	Austria Wien	Loan
2009-08-31	Mohamadou Sissoko	France	Udinese	(Belgium) Eupen	Loan
2009-08-31	Willy Aubameyang	Gabon	Milan	(Belgium) Eupen	Loan
2009-08-31	Nicolas Desenclos	France	Internazionale	(Belgium) Eupen	Loan
2009-08-31	Denilson Gabionetta	Brazil	(Brazil) SEV Hortolândia	Crotone	Loan
2009-08-31	Pablo Pallante	Uruguay	(Uruguay) Cerro	Gallipoli	Loan
2009-08-31	Daniele Daino	Italy	Modena	Gallipoli	Free
2009-08-31	Francesco Millesi	Italy	Catania	Salernitana	Free
2009-08-31	Francesco Montervino	Italy	Napoli	Salernitana	Free
2009-08-31	Dragan Mihajlović	Switzerland	(Switzerland) Bellinzona	Parma	Undisclosed
2009-08-31	Christian Jidayi	Italy	Cesena	Novara	Undisclosed
2009-08-31	Andrea Ferretti	Italy	Cesena	Pavia	Co-ownership, €500
2009-08-31	José Espinal	Dominican Republic	Novara	Cesena	Undisclosed
2009-08-31	Michael Girasole	Italy	AlbinoLeffe	Canavese	Loan
2009-08-31	Carlo Gervasoni	Italy	AlbinoLeffe	Mantova	Undisclosed
2009-08-31	Fabio Giordano	Italy	Cittadella	Ravenna	Loan
2009-08-31	Davide Di Quinzio	Italy	Pro Sesto	AlbinoLeffe	Undisclosed
2009-08-31	Davide Di Quinzio	Italy	AlbinoLeffe	Pro Sesto	Loan
2009-08-31	Dario Passoni	Italy	Mantova	AlbinoLeffe	Undisclosed
2009-08-31	Luca Franchini	Italy	Mantova	Gallipoli	Free
2009-08-31	Alessandro Grandoni	Italy	Mantova	Gallipoli	Loan
2009-08-31	Filippo Savi	Italy	Parma	Carpenedolo	Loan
2009-08-31	Gabriele Paonessa	Italy	Bologna	Vicenza	Loan
2009-08-31	Alessio Sestu	Italy	Avellino	Vicenza	Free
2009-08-31	Joelson	Brazil	Reggina	Grosseto	Loan
2009-08-31	Pasquale Maiorino	Italy	Vicenza	Lecco	Loan
2009-08-31	Emanuele Testardi	Italy	Pescara	Sampdoria	Loan
2009-08-31	Mike Tullberg	Denmark	Reggina	(Germany) Rot-Weiß Oberhausen	Undisclosed
2009-08-31	Antimo Iunco	Italy	Chievo	Cittadella	Loan
2009-08-31	Nicola Pozzi	Italy	Empoli	Sampdoria	Loan
2009-08-31	Robert Guri Baqaj	Sweden	(Sweden) Limhamn Bunkeflo	AlbinoLeffe	Undisclosed
2009-08-31	Davide Zoboli	Italy	Brescia	Torino	Loan
2009-08-31	Rachid Arma	Italy	SPAL	Torino	Co-ownership, Undisclosed
2009-08-31	Francesco Pambianchi	Italy	Pergocrema	Parma	Co-ownership resolution, €500
2009-08-31	Niccolò Galli	Italy	Pergocrema	Parma	Co-ownership resolution, €500
2009-08-31	Diego Manzoni	Italy	Pergocrema	Parma	€500,000 (swap with Pambianchi & Galli)
2009-08-31	Francesco Pambianchi	Italy	Parma	Pergocrema	Co-ownership, €250,000 (swap with Manzoni)
2009-08-31	Niccolò Galli	Italy	Parma	Pergocrema	Co-ownership, €250,000 (swap with Manzoni)
2009-08-31	Bogdan Pătraşcu	Romania	Piacenza	Padova	Undisclosed
2009-08-31	Davide Bariti	Italy	Carrarese	Triestina	Undisclosed
2009-08-31	Davide Bariti	Italy	Triestina	Carrarese	Co-ownership, Undisclosed
2009-08-31	Antonio Gaeta	Italy	Ascoli	Legnano	Undisclosed
2009-08-31	Renato Piovezan	Brazil	Chievo	(Greece) Aris	Undisclosed
2009-08-31	Marco Sansovini	Italy	Grosseto	Pescara	Undisclosed
2009-08-31	Christian Anelli	Italy	Carpenedolo	Giacomense	Undisclosed (co-owned with Parma)
2009-08-31	Jerry Mbakogu	Nigeria	Padova (youth)	Palermo (youth)	Loan
31 August 2009	Davide Bertoncini	Italy	Genoa (youth)	Piacenza (youth)	Loan
2009-09-01	Kerlon	Brazil	Internazionale	(Netherlands) Ajax	Loan
2009-09-01	Željko Kalac	Australia	Milan	(Greece) Kavala	Free
2009-09-01	Matteo Bruscagin	Italy	Milan	Gubbio	Loan
2009-09-01	Olivier N'Siabamfumu	France	Crotone	Carrarese	Undisclosed
2009-09-01	Leandro Antonio Martínez	Italy	Parma	South Tyrol	Loan
1 September 2009	Fabrizio Di Bella	Italy	Livorno	Pergocrema	Loan
2009-09-02	Papa Waigo	Senegal	Fiorentina	(England) Southampton	Loan

== Summer transfer window (date unknown) ==
Date	Name	Nat	Moving from	Moving to	Fee
	Gianluca Nicco	Italy	Ivrea	Mantova	Undisclosed
	Manuel Angelilli	Italy	Milan (youth)	Pro Vercelli	?
	Alessandro Elia	Italy	Parma (youth)	Bellaria	Loan
	Nebil Caidi	Italy	Cesena	Giacomense	Co-ownership, Undisclosed
	Daniele Piro	Italy	Chievo	Cosenza	Co-ownership, Undisclosed
	Alessio Curcio	Italy	Juventus (youth)	Casale	?
	Emiliano Tortolano	Italy	Roma (youth)	Colligiana	Free
	Michael Perrier	Switzerland	Genoa	(Switzerland) Lugano	Loan
	Giorgio Merlano	Italy	Juventus	Canavese	Loan
	Rubén Olivera	Uruguay	Juventus	(Uruguay) Peñarol	Free
	Gianluca Toscano	Italy	Grosseto	Fidene	Free
	Diego Farias	Brazil	Chievo	Verona	
	Oussama Essabr	Morocco	Juventus	Arezzo	
	Gabriele Puccio	Italy	Internazionale	Portogruaro	Co-ownership, Undisclosed
	Stefano Pondaco	Italy	Sampdoria	Portogruaro	Co-ownership, Undisclosed
	Jonathan Bottinelli	Argentina	Sampdoria	(Argentina) San Lorenzo	Undisclosed
	Massimo Coda	Italy	Bologna	Cremonese	Undisclosed
	Filippo Noventa	Italy	Milan	Monza	Loan
	Andrea Gasparri	Italy	Parma	Giulianova	
	Mirko Savini	Italy	Palermo	(Greece) PAOK	Free
	Mauricio Pinilla	Chile	(Cyprus) Apollon Limassol	Grosseto	Free
	Alberto Maria Fontana	Italy	Torino	Novara	Free
	Nicola Ventola	Italy	Torino	Novara	Free
	Matteo D'Alessandro	Italy	Genoa	Reggiana	
	Umberto Eusepi	Italy	Genoa	Reggiana	
	Daniele Paponi	Italy	Parma	Perugia	Loan
	Matteo Mandorlini	Italy	Parma	Esperia Viareggio	Loan
	Marcel Román	Uruguay	Genoa	(Uruguay) Peñarol	Undisclosed
	Maximiliano Re	Argentina	Siena	(Spain) Ibiza-Eivissa	Undisclosed
	Federico Re	Italy	Siena	Sangiovannese	Undisclosed
	Filippo Bigeschi	Italy	Siena	Novara	Loan
	Michele Marconi	Italy	Atalanta	Lumezzane	Loan
	Federico Ciasca	Italy	Brescia	Lumezzane	Co-ownership, Undisclosed
	Camillo Ciano	Italy	Napoli	Lecco	Loan
	Luca Giannone	Italy	Napoli	Lecco	Loan
	Cosmo Palumbo	Italy	Napoli	Lecco	Loan
	Mario D'Urso	Italy	Napoli	Lecco	Loan
	Simone Ciancio	Italy	Sampdoria	Alessandria	Undisclosed
	Horacio Erpen	Argentina	Sassuolo	Arezzo	Undisclosed
	Sergiu Suciu	Romania	Torino	Legnano	Loan
	Eder Baù	Italy	Padova	Pro Patria	Free
	Stefano Pietribiasi	Italy	Vicenza	Sambonifacese	Co-ownership, Undisclosed
	Mirko Lamantia	Italy	Genoa	Borgosesia	Free
	Andrea Talignani	Italy	Parma	Pisa	Loan
	Gianmarco D'Oria	Italy	Empoli	Prato	Co-ownership, Undisclosed
	Matteo Prandelli	Italy	Siena	Colligiana	Loan
	Andrea Ardito	Italy	Lecce	Como	
	Daniele Fiorentino	Italy	Bari	Noicattaro	Loan
	Sulaiman Sesay Fullah	Sierra Leone	Internazionale	(Belgium) Eupen	Loan

== Out of windows transfers ==
Date	Name	Nat	Moving from	Moving to	Fee
	Tabaré Viudez	Uruguay	Milan	(Uruguay) Defensor Sporting	Free
	Mathías Cardacio	Uruguay	Milan	(Uruguay) Defensor Sporting	Free
2009-09-04	Dino Fava	Italy	Treviso	Salernitana	Free
2009-09-05	Arturo Di Napoli	Italy	Salernitana	Messina	Free
2009-09-05	Roberto D'Aversa	Italy	Treviso	Gallipoli	Free
2009-09-06	Antonino D'Agostino	Italy	Atalanta	Progetto Sant'Elia	Free
2009-09-09	Nikola Vujadinović	Montenegro	Udinese	(Romania) Unirea Alba Iulia	Loan
2009-09-09	Blažej Vaščák	Slovakia	Lecce	(Slovakia) Košice	Free
2009-09-10	Gabriele Sollitto	Italy	Sansovino	Ancona	Free
2009-09-17	Michele Ferri	Italy	Sampdoria	Vicenza	Free
2009-09-21	Leonardo Colucci	Italy	Cremonese	Modena	Free
2009-09-23	Olivier Dacourt	France	Internazionale	(Belgium) Standard Liège	Free
2009-09-25	Giorgio Santarelli	Italy	Monopoli	Ascoli	Free
