= Fei (surname) =

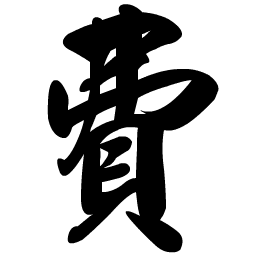

Origin
- Origin: Chinese
- Meaning: "fees"
- Region of origin: Chinese

Other names
- Variant forms: Translations simplified Chinese: 费; traditional Chinese: 費; pinyin: Fèi

Fei (simplified Chinese: 费; traditional Chinese: 費; pinyin: Fèi) is a traditional Chinese surname. It was 65th in the Hundred Family Surnames.

This surname has three main sources. Two of them are from the State of Lu during the Spring and Autumn period (722–481 BC), part of present-day Shandong province. A senior official of the state of Lu was granted a city named Fei, while the son of a certain duke was granted a county named Fei. Both of these place names were adopted by descendants as surnames. A third source of the name is Fei Zhong, a high minister of the Yin Dynasty (1401–1122 BC).

== Notable people ==
- Fei Hsiao-Tung, professor of sociology and anthropology
- Fei Junlong, commander of the second Chinese space flight
- Fei Wuji, corrupt minister of the State of Chu during the Spring and Autumn period
- Fei Xiang (transcription of the English name "Philips"), Taiwanese-American pop singer
- Fei Yi, regent of Shu Han during the Three Kingdoms period
- Fei Yu-ching (Stage-name), Taiwanese singer
- Fei Qinyuan, member of SNH48
- Yunsi Fei, Chinese-American electronics engineer

== Italian surname ==
- Alessandro Fei (disambiguation)
- Giacomo Fei (born 1992), Italian footballer

== See also ==
- FEI (disambiguation)
- Wang Feifei (born 1987), Chinese singer, actress, presenter and model
