= Scarlato =

Scarlato is a surname. Notable people with the surname include:

- Christian Scarlato (born 1983), Italian football player
- Gennaro Scarlato (born 1977), Italian football player and manager
- Orest Scarlato (1920–1994), Russian malacologist and hydrobiologist

== See also ==
- Scarlat
