= Monterotondo Calcio =

Monterotondo Calcio may refer to:

- A.S.D. Monterotondo Calcio, former name of S.S.D. Eretum Monterotondo Calcio, Italian association football club founded in 2013 by a merger of Atletico Monterotondo and Città di Marino
- Polisportiva Monterotondo Calcio, a defunct Italian football club, relocated to Maccarese, Fiumicino in 2013
