= Lamantia =

Lamantia is a surname. Notable people with the surname include:

- Philip Lamantia (1927–2005), American poet
- Paul Lamantia (born 1938), American visual artist
- Mirko Lamantia (born 1990), Italian footballer
- Morgan LaMantia (born 1986), American politician and lawyer
