= Tonani =

Tonani is an Italian surname. Notable people with the surname include:

- Davide Tonani (born 1992), Italian footballer
- Giuseppe Tonani (1890–1971), Italian weightlifter and tug of war competitor
