= Conte Arduino Mangoni =

Stadium in Isola del Liri, Italy

Coordinates: 41°40′31″N 13°34′50″E

Stadio Conte Arduino Mangoni
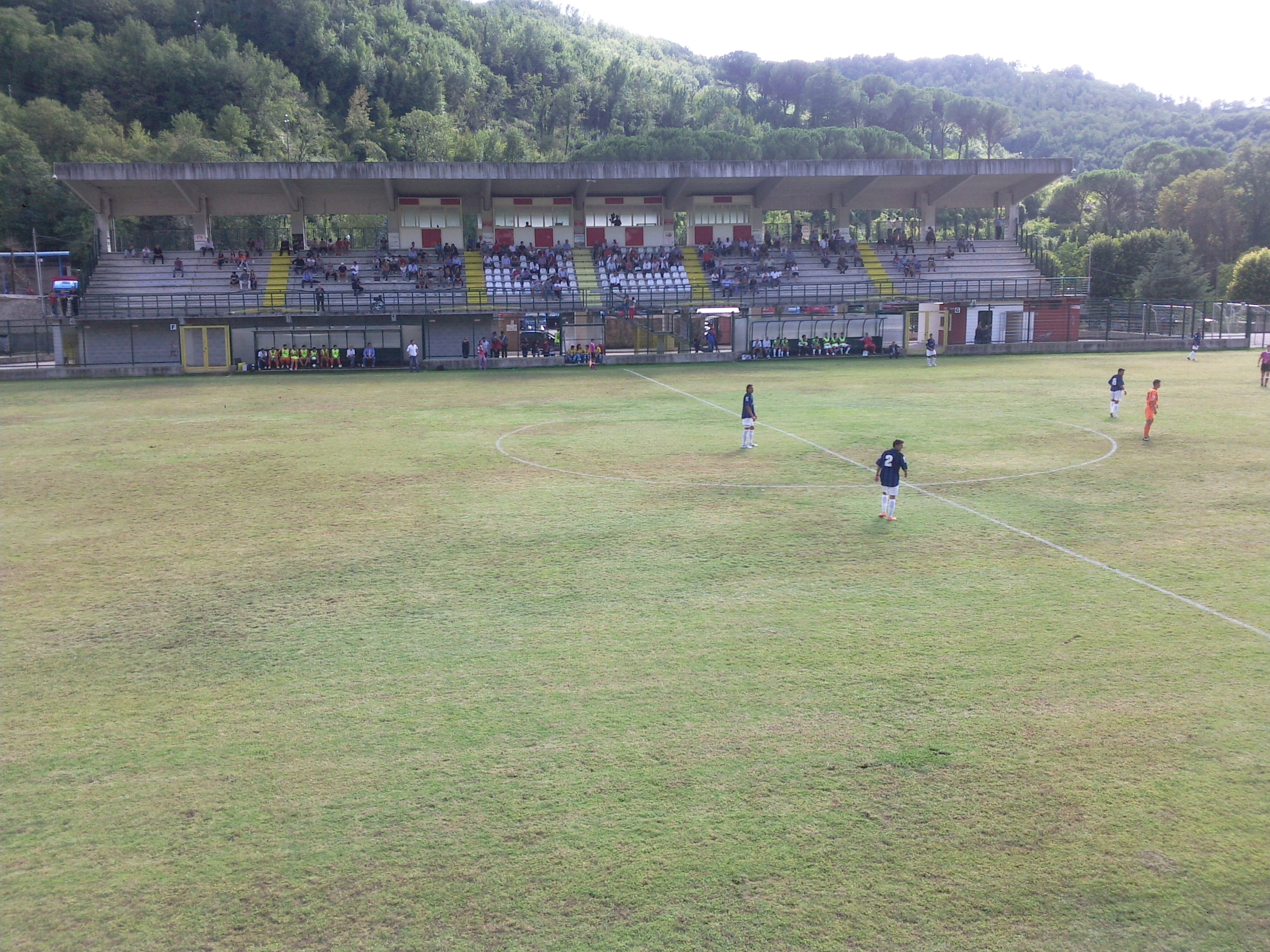
- Stadio Isola liri 2012
- Interactive map of Stadio Conte Arduino Mangoni
- Location: Isola del Liri, Italy
- Owner: Isola del Liri
- Operator: Isola Liri
- Capacity: 3,120

Construction
- Opened: 1990

Tenant
- Isola Liri

Stadio Arduino Mangoni, is a multi-purpose stadium in Isola del Liri, Italy. It is mainly used mostly for football matches and hosts the home matches of Isola Liri in Serie D. The stadium has a capacity of 3,120 spectators and meets Lega Pro criteria.
