= Luca Lagnese =

Italian footballer

Personal information
- Date of birth: 6 September 1987 (age 39)
- Place of birth: Turin, Italy
- Height: 1.82 m (6 ft 0 in)
- Position: Defender

Youth career
- Juventus

Senior career*
Years	Team	Apps	(Gls)
2007–2010	Juventus	0	(0)
2007–2008	→ Bellaria (loan)	12	(0)
2008–2009	→ Canavese (loan)	3	(0)
2009	→ Viareggio (loan)	1	(0)
2009–2010	→ Isola Liri (loan)	0	(0)
2010–2012	Viareggio	0	(0)
Total		16	(0)
- * Club domestic league appearances and goals as of 26 July 2012

Luca Lagnese (born 6 September 1987) is an Italian footballer who played in the fourth tier of football in Italy.

== Club career ==
=== Juventus ===
Lagnese started his career with Serie A giants, and hometown club, Juventus FC, in 1999, when he joined their youth setup. He was promoted to their youth sector. He was promoted to the Primavera youth team in 2005, and graduated the youth system in 2007. He was offered the no.37 shirt in the first team, after being called up to the senior squad on occasion during the 2006–07 Serie B season. He signed his first professional contract in mid-2007, which last until 30 June 2010, the maximum length that FIGC allowed, however, Lagnese never made his Juventus debut.

=== Loan Spells ===
In July 2007, Lagnese was loaned out to Serie C2 side Bellaria where he played 12 league matches. In the next season he remained in Lega Pro Seconda Divisione (ex-Serie C2) when he was loaned out to Group A club Canavese. He only made 3 league appearances that season. In January 2009 he left for Viareggio, returning to Lega Pro Seconda Divisione Group B. The loan proved unsuccessful once more, however, as Lagnese only managed to play once, the last match of the season, in a 1–1 draw with his former club Bellaria.

In 2009–10 season, Lagnese remained in the Italian 4th tier, this time being loaned to Isola Liri of Group C, in a pack deal where the Lazio based club also signed Yobie Bassoule and Federico Mirarchi. Lagnese failed to appear for the club, and was released by Juventus upon the expiration of his contract on 30 June 2010.

=== F.C. Esperia Viareggio ===
Following his tenure with Juventus, Lagnese signed for former club F.C. Esperia Viareggio on a free transfer. He was released at the conclusion of the 2011-12 statistical season, and is currently a free agent.
