= Manuel Angelilli =

Italian footballer

Personal information
- Date of birth: 5 August 1990 (age 36)
- Place of birth: Rome, Italy
- Height: 1.87 m (6 ft 2 in)
- Positions: Left back; left winger

Team information
- Current team: Trastevere

Youth career
- 2007–2009: Milan

Senior career*
Years	Team	Apps	(Gls)
2009–2010	Pro Vercelli	3	(0)
2011–2012	Città di Marino	29	(15)
2012–2014	Reggina	0	(0)
2012–2013	→ Latina (loan)	18	(0)
2013–2014	→ Sassari Torres (loan)	16	(0)
2014	→ L'Aquila (loan)	1	(0)
2014	Viterbese	2	(0)
2014–2015	Fondi	27	(5)
2015–2016	Recanatese	24	(4)
2017	Abano	15	(1)
2017–2019	Matelica	64	(13)
2019–2020	Monterosi	25	(2)
2020–2022	Albalonga	56	(6)
2022–2023	Vis Artena	21	(1)
2023–2024	Avezzano	27	(0)
2024–	Trastevere	57	(3)
- * Club domestic league appearances and goals as of 22 Juny 2026

Manuel Angelilli (born 5 August 1990) is an Italian footballer who plays as left back for Serie D club Trastevere.

== Career ==
In 2009, he was transferred to Pro Vercelli from Milan.

In 2011–12 Serie D, he scored every two games for Città di Marino.

On 4 July 2012, Reggina signed Angelilli. On 9 August 2012, he left on loan to Latina.
