= Yobie Bassoule =

Burkinabé footballer (born 1988)

Personal information
- Date of birth: December 24, 1988 (age 37)
- Place of birth: Pansiaka, Burkina Faso
- Position: Defender

Team information
- Current team: Isola Liri
- Number: 25

Youth career
- 2006–2009: Juventus

Senior career*
Years	Team	Apps	(Gls)
2009–2010	Juventus	0	(0)
2009–2010	→ Isola Liri (loan)	1	(0)
2011–	Isola Liri		
2012	→ RBD Borinage (loan)		
- * Club domestic league appearances and goals

Yobie Bassoule (born December 24, 1988, in Pansiaka, Upper Volta) is a Burkinabé professional football player, who currently plays for A.C. Isola Liri.

== Career ==
=== Juventus ===
Bassoule began his career in the Juventus youth setup, and graduated in 2009. He was promoted to the first team, but was instantly loaned out to A.C. Isola Liri where he joined teammate Luca Lagnese. He has made 1 league appearance since joining the Lega Pro club and was signed on permanent basis in January 2011. He joined in January 2012 from Italian side A.C. Isola Liri on loan to Belgian lower side Royal Boussu Dour Borinage.
