= Alessandro Moro =

Italian footballer (born 1984)

Personal information
- Date of birth: 2 October 1984 (age 42)
- Place of birth: Latisana, Italy
- Height: 1.81 m (5 ft 11 in)
- Position: Defensive midfielder

Youth career
- 2001–2003: Udinese

Senior career*
Years	Team	Apps	(Gls)
2003–2006	Foggia	47	(4)
2004	→ Isernia (loan)	11	(2)
2006	Ascoli	2	(0)
2006–2009	Treviso	39	(2)
2007–2008	→ Grosseto (loan)	18	(1)
2009–2010	Gallipoli	10	(0)
2010–2011	Andria	11	(2)
2011–2012	Sacilese	8	(1)

International career
2000–2001	Italy U17	14	(1)
2002	Italy U18	1	(0)
- * Club domestic league appearances and goals

Alessandro Moro (born 2 October 1984) is an Italian former footballer who played as a defensive midfielder.

== Career ==
Moro started his career at Udinese, which he was sold to Foggia in a co-ownership deal. In June 2004 he was signed by Foggia outright in June 2004. He joined Treviso in 2006 in another co-ownership deal, for a peppercorn of €500, after Udinese signed Moro from Ascoli for free, as a free agent. In June 2009 Treviso signed Moro outright. When Treviso were declared bankrupt in August 2009, Moro was signed by side Gallipoli along with team-mate William Pianu. For 2010–11 he was signed by 1° Divisione side A.S. Andria BAT.
