= Filippo Fracaro =

Italian footballer

Personal information
- Date of birth: 11 March 1992 (age 34)
- Place of birth: Asiago, Italy
- Height: 1.82 m (6 ft 0 in)
- Position: Left winger

Team information
- Current team: Calcio Schio

Youth career
- Gan Thiene Villaverla
- 2006–2009: Internazionale
- 2009–2011: Chievo
- 2010: → Vicenza (loan)
- 2011: → Bassano (loan)
- 2011–2012: Bassano

Senior career*
Years	Team	Apps	(Gls)
2011–2013	Bassano	3	(0)
2013–2014	Sacilese	31	(8)
2014–2016	Arzignano	61	(5)
2016–2017	Abano	30	(8)
2017–2019	Arzignano	56	(8)
2019–2020	Este		
2020–2021	Luparense		
2021–2022	FC Bassano 1903		
2022	US Levico Terme		
2022–2025	Unione La Rocca Altavilla		
2025–	Calcio Schio		
- * Club domestic league appearances and goals as of 03:37, 1 October 2021 (UTC)

Filippo Fracaro (born 11 March 1992) is an Italian footballer who plays as a left winger for Calcio Schio.

== Biography ==
=== Youth career ===
Born in Asiago, the Province of Vicenza, Veneto, Fracaro started his career in various youth teams of Italy. He spent 2006 to 2009 in F.C. Internazionale Milano, which he played from Giovanissimi Nazionali under-15 team to Allievi Nazionali under-17 team. He finished as the runner-up of the league in 2009, scoring 7 goals in regular season. In August 2009 he joined Veneto club Chievo for free along with Davide Tonani (loan), Edile Micheletti Awoh (loan) and youngster Francesco D'Ascanio (outright deal). He was the member of Primavera under-20 team, but in January 2010 left for Vicenza, another Veneto team. In 2010–11 season (in January 2011?), he left for Bassano (A team within the Province of Vicenza) and played in Campionato Berretti, the Lega Pro equivalent of Campionato Primavera. Fabio Barichello also joined the opposite side in exchange. In June 2011 Bassano signed the remained 50% rights of Shadi Ghosheh and signed Fracaro for another season. Bassano teammate Luca Munarini also joined Chievo on loan in exchange.

=== Bassano ===
Fracaro made his professional debut on 9 October 2011, substituted Guerrino Gasparello in the second half. He also remained in Berretti team for 2011–12 season.

=== Este ===
Ahead of the 2019/20 season, Fracaro joined A.C. Este.

=== International career ===
He received his single international team call-up was in 2007, to a training camp for player born 1992/1993.
