= Scarlat =

Scarlat is a Romanian male given name and surname that may refer to:

- Scarlat Callimachi
- Scarlat Callimachi (hospodar)
- Scarlat Cantacuzino
- Scarlat Ghica
- Cristina Scarlat
- Roxana Scarlat
