= Christian Anelli =

Italian footballer (born 1989)

Personal information
- Date of birth: 1 February 1989 (age 37)
- Place of birth: Asola, Italy
- Height: 1.83 m (6 ft 0 in)
- Position: Centre back

Team information
- Current team: Olbia
- Number: 5

Youth career
- Montichiari

Senior career*
Years	Team	Apps	(Gls)
2007–2008	Montichiari	0	(0)
2008–2009	Parma	1	(0)
2009–2012	Giacomense	12	(0)
2010–2011	→ Valenzana (loan)	0	(0)
2012–2013	Montichiari	13	(0)
2013	Alzano Cene	6	(0)
2013–2015	Montichiari	43	(1)
2015–2016	Pergolettese	32	(3)
2016–2017	Fanfulla	15	(3)
2017–2019	Como	59	(2)
2019–2021	Foggia	37	(2)
2021–2022	Seregno	3	(0)
2022–2023	Chiasso	12	(0)
2023–2024	Atletico Castegnato	15	(0)
2024–	Olbia	8	(0)
- * Club domestic league appearances and goals as of 20 March 2026

Christian Anelli (born 1 February 1989) is an Italian professional footballer who plays as a centre back for Serie D club Olbia.

== Club career ==
Born in Asola, Anelli made his senior debut for Serie A club Parma on 4 May 2008 against Genoa, as a late substitute.

On 31 July 2019 he joined Calcio Foggia.

On 24 August 2021, he signed with Seregno.

On 1 August 2024, he signed a two-year contract with Olbia Calcio 1905.
