= William Pianu =

Italian footballer

Personal information
- Date of birth: 7 December 1975 (age 50)
- Place of birth: Turin, Italy
- Height: 1.81 m (5 ft 11 1/2 in)
- Position: Defender

Youth career
- Juventus

Senior career*
Years	Team	Apps	(Gls)
1993–1996	Juventus	0	(0)
1995–1996	→ Pro Vercelli (loan)	28	(0)
1996–1997	Rimini	20	(3)
1997–1998	Casarano	13	(0)
1998–1999	Cittadella	18	(0)
1999–2004	Treviso	78	(3)
2004–2005	Triestina	47	(1)
2006–2007	Bari	47	(2)
2007–2009	Treviso	45	(0)
2009–2010	Gallipoli	4	(0)
2010	Pergocrema	12	(1)
2010–2011	Venezia	16	(0)

Managerial career
- 2012–2013: Treviso (assistant)
- 2013: Treviso (youth)
- 2017–2019: Calvi Noale
- * Club domestic league appearances and goals

William Pianu (born 7 December 1975) is an Italian football coach and a former defender.

== Career ==
Pianu started his career at Juventus. He spent 7 seasons at Treviso.

After the bankrupt of Treviso, he was signed by Gallipoli along with team-mate Alessandro Moro in August 2009. He left in summer 2010 his club U.S. Pergocrema 1932 to sign for Venezia.
