= Monterotondo =

- Comune
- Comune di Monterotondo
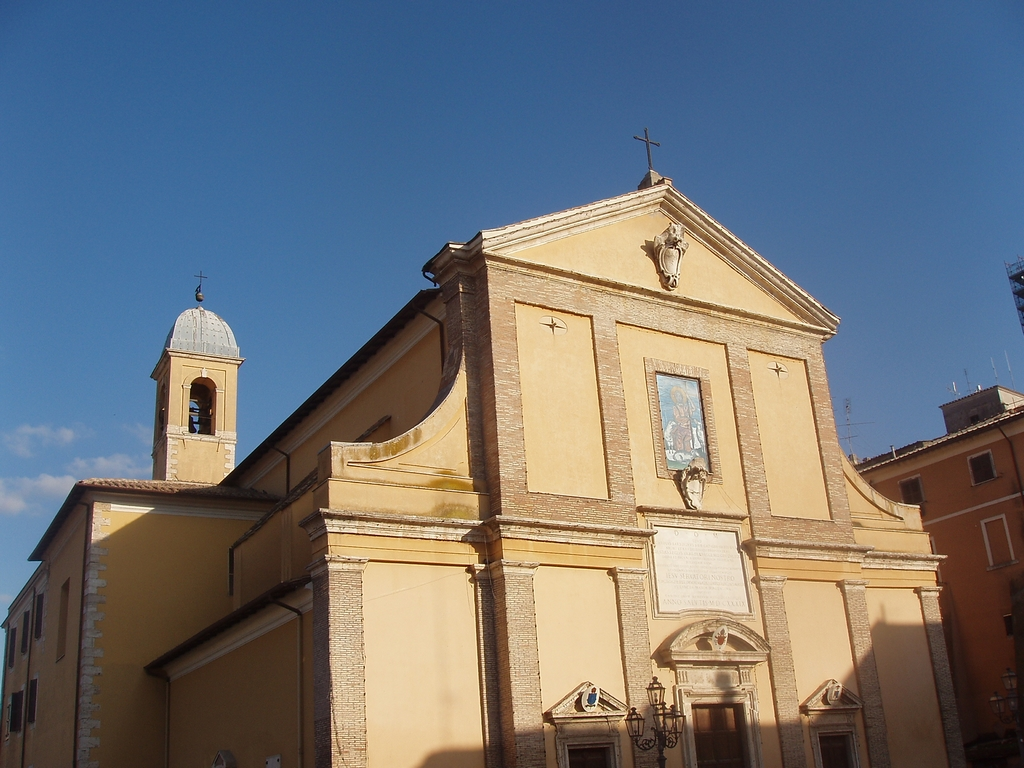
- The Cathedral of Monterotondo

- Coat of arms

- location of Monterotondo in the Metropolitan City of Rome

- Location of Monterotondo in Lazio Monterotondo (Italy) Monterotondo (European Union)
- Coordinates: 42°03′N 12°37′E
- Country: Italy
- Region: Lazio
- Metropolitan city: Rome (RM)

Government
  - Mayor: Riccardo Varone (Partito Democratico)

Area
  - Total: 40 km^{2} (15 sq mi)
- Elevation: 165 m (541 ft)

Population (30 November 2017)
  - Total: 41,140
  - Density: 1,000/km^{2} (2,700/sq mi)
- Demonym: Eretini or Monterotondesi
- Time zone: UTC+1 (CET)
  - Summer (DST): UTC+2 (CEST)
- Postal code: 00015, 00016
- Dialing code: 06
- Patron saint: Sts. Philip and James
- Saint day: May 3
- Website: Official website

Monterotondo is a town and comune in the Metropolitan City of Rome, central Italy.

== History ==
According to some historians, Monterotondo is the heir of the ancient Sabine town of Eretum, although the modern settlement appeared in the 10th-11th centuries in a different location. The name derives from the medieval corruption (then Mons Teres, then Monte Ritondo) of the original Mons Eretum.

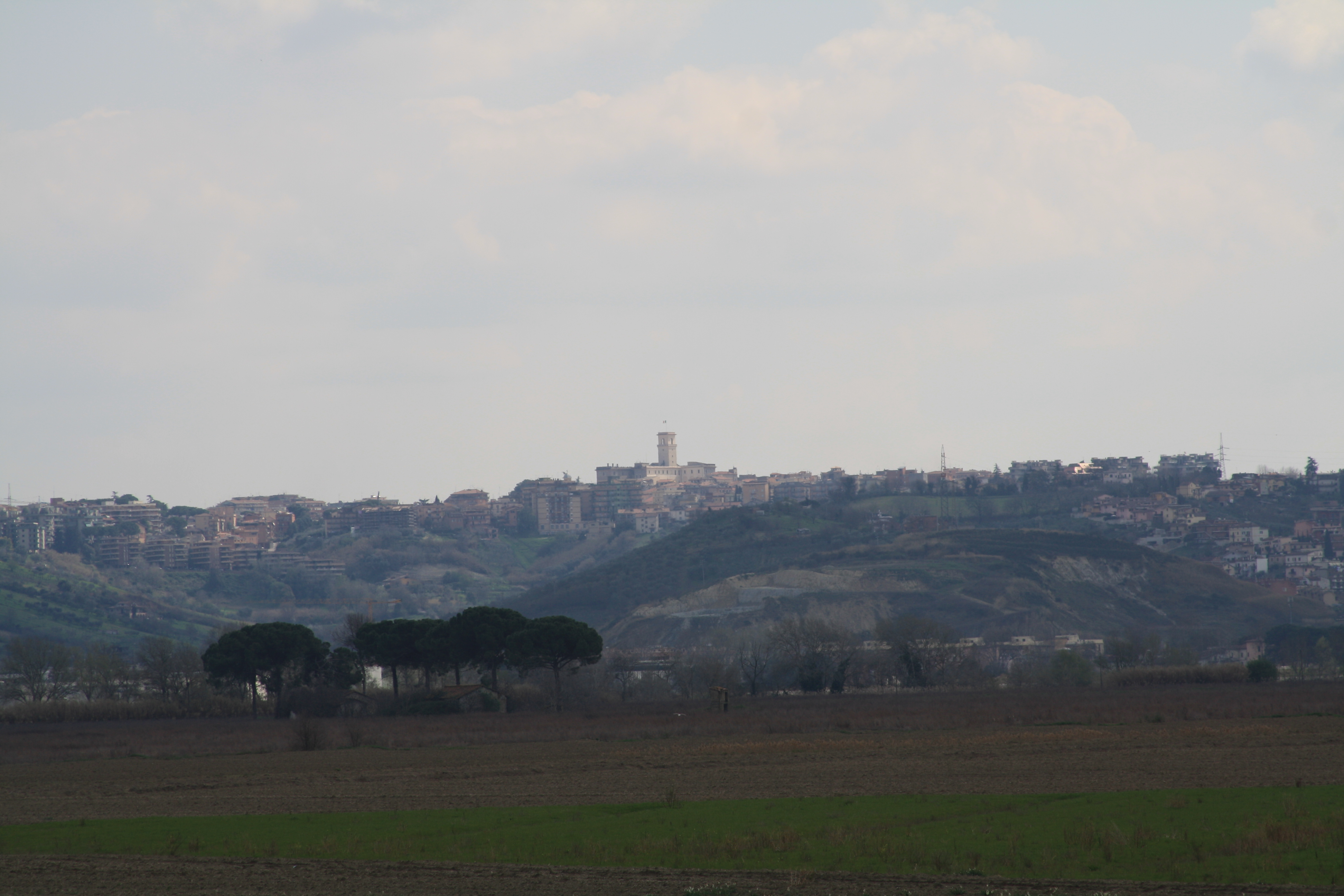
Monterotondo seen from the Tiber Valley.

In the Middle Ages, due to its location across the Via Salaria, Monterotondo was a strategic point for the defense of Rome. Initially under the Capocci family, it was sold in the 12th century to the Orsini, who held it until the 18th century. In 1432, it was seized by the condottiero Niccolò Fortebraccio, and in 1485, it was set on fire by the Orsini.

In 1634, the Barberini acquired the town, restoring or enlarging several edifices, and building the cathedral in 1639. On 28 April 1864, the Rome and Monterotondo Rail Road was opened for service.

In 1943, after the Italian armistice with the Allies, 800 German paratroopers tried unsuccessfully to reconquer it.

== Main sights ==
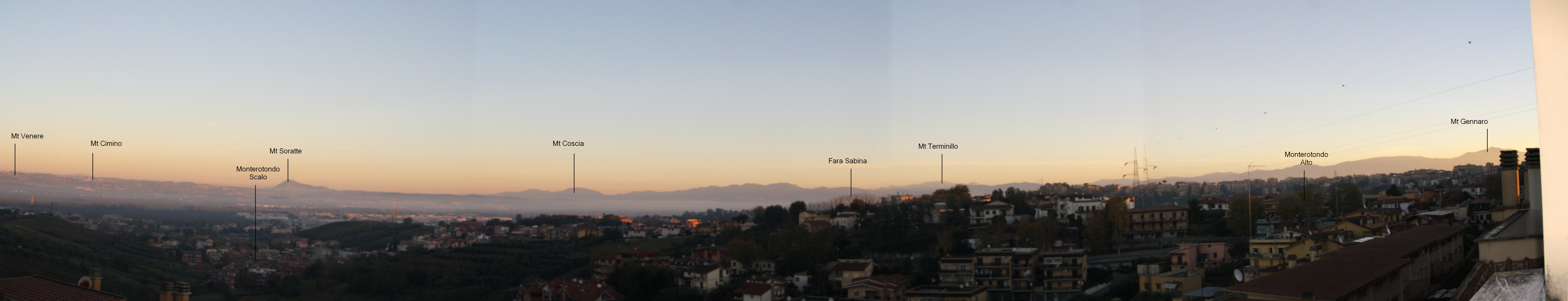
The Tiber valley seen from Monterotondo, looking almost exactly north (≈ 5°).

- The Baroque Duomo (Cathedral) Church of Madonna delle Grazie
- Palazzo Orsini, including frescoes by Girolamo Siciolante, the Zuccari brothers and Perin del Vaga (attributed).
- Archaeological museum, with remains from Eretum, Crustumerium and Nomentum.

== Science and Technology ==
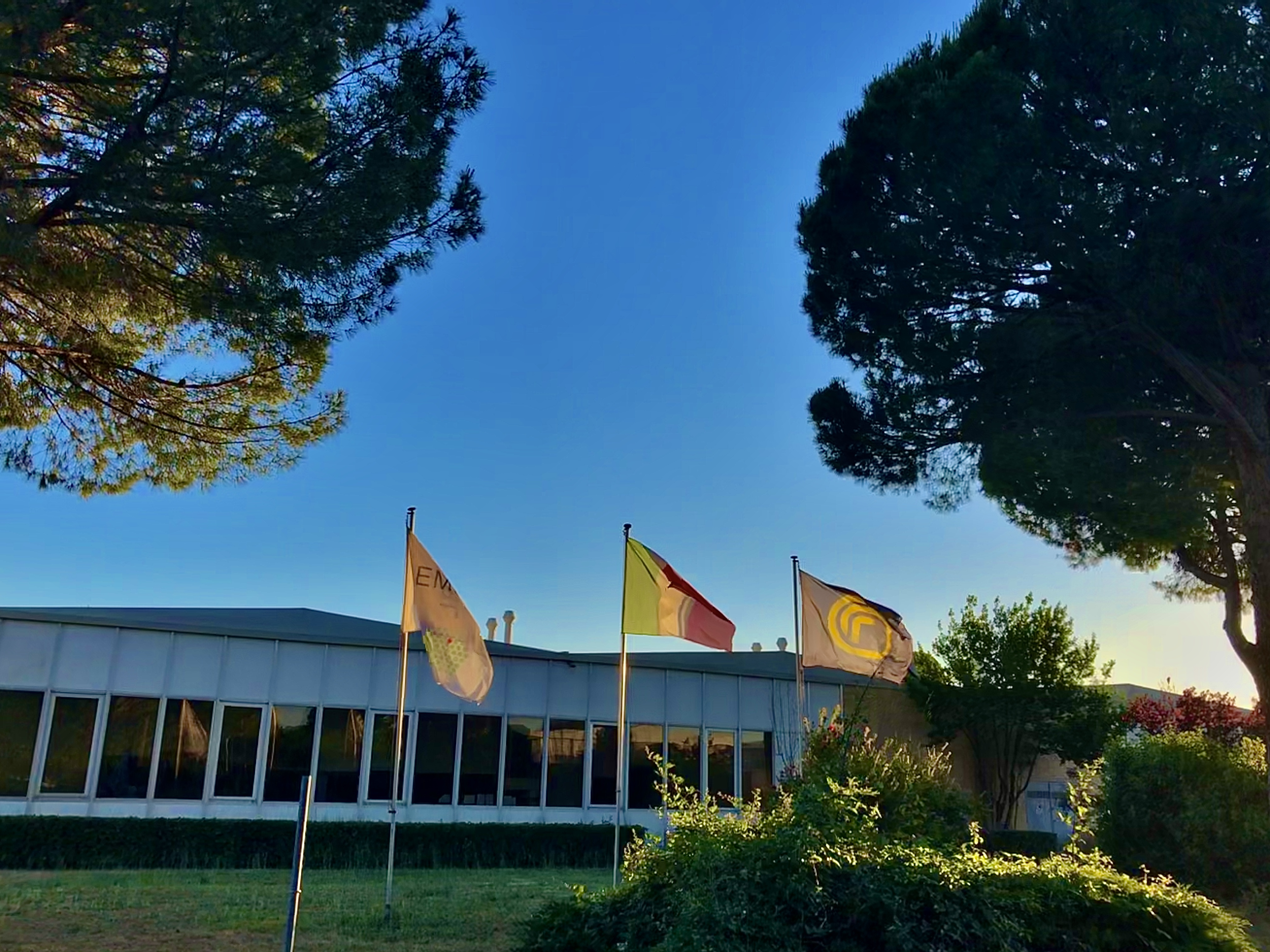
EMBL Rome Building.

The European Molecular Biology Laboratory outstation in Rome is actually situated in Monterotondo. Its research is focused on Epigenetics and Neurobiology. It has become established as a basic research center of excellence and innovation in mouse genetics and functional genomics. It captures new opportunities and applications of mouse genetic manipulation. Alliances with other European academic research and clinical centers have established EMBL Rome as a hub for the international mouse research network which exploits applications of mouse genetic manipulation to biomedical problems.

== Sports ==
Polisportiva Monterotondo Calcio was the major football club of the city. The club played in Serie D several times. However, the club started to play in Rome and was renamed Polisportiva Monterotondo Lupa in 2011 and again relocated to Maccarese, Fiumicino as Pol. Maccarese Giada in 2013. In 2014 that team was folded.

Another team of the city, Atletico Monterotondo, merged with another football club from Marino and started to play in Eccellenza Lazio in 2013 as A.S.D. Monterotondo Calcio. In 2016 the club merged with another team A.S.D. Eretum, to become A.S.D. Eretum Monterotondo.

The third team of the city, Real Monterotondo Scalo, located in the Monterotondo Scalo frazione of Monterotondo. The team was promoted Serie D in 2021.
