= Christian Scarlato =

Italian footballer (born 1983)

Personal information
- Date of birth: 24 August 1983 (age 43)
- Place of birth: Formia, Italy
- Height: 1.78 m (5 ft 10 in)
- Position: Midfielder

Team information
- Current team: Marino

Youth career
- 1999: Fiorentina
- 2000–2002: Roma

Senior career*
Years	Team	Apps	(Gls)
2002–2005	Roma	0	(0)
2002–2003	→ Prato (loan)	5	(0)
2003–2004	→ Teramo (loan)	4	(0)
2004	→ Grosseto (loan)	12	(1)
2004–2005	→ Salernitana (loan)	4	(0)
2005	→ Fermana (loan)	10	(0)
2005–2006	Acireale	11	(0)
2006–2007	Manfredonia	15	(1)
2007–2008	Giulianova	10	(0)
2008–2009	Pomigliano		
2009	Grosseto	0	(0)
2009–2010	Pisa	5	(0)
2010	Formia		
2010–	Marino		

International career
1999	Italy U-15	1	(0)
2000	Italy U-17	2	(0)
2002–2003	Italy U-20	8	(0)
- * Club domestic league appearances and goals

Christian Scarlato (born 24 August 1983) is a former Italian professional footballer who plays for Marino in Eccellenza (amateur league).

He played in the Serie B for Salernitana and for the Italian national youth teams.

== Biography ==
He joined Teramo on 16 July 2003 along with Attilio Nicodemo and Jacopo Mariscoli. After several loan, he joined Acireale in co-ownership deal in 2005, valued a nominal fee of €500. Since 2008–09 season he played in Serie D and Eccellenza Lazio teams (non-professional leagues). He joined hometown club Formia in October 2010. In December, he joined Marino.

He also signed by Serie B team Grosseto on 10 August 2009 but later released along with Gianluca Toscano.

=== International career ===
He capped for Italy youth teams in friendly matches. He capped for Italy under-15 team, at that time the feeder team of Italy U-16 team (UEFA changed the name of the event from U-16 to U-17 in 2001). He also played for U-17 team (feeder team of Italy U-18 team, after 2001 renamed to U-19 team) and U-20 team (feeder team of U-21 team) in various tournament, likes in the Four Nations Tournament.

== Honours ==
- Serie D: 2010 (Pisa)
