= ASD Città di Marino Calcio =

Italian football club

Città di Marino
- Full name: Associazione Sportiva Dilettantistica Città di Marino Calcio
- Founded: 1993
- Dissolved: 2013 (merged to form A.S.D. Monterotondo Calcio)
- Ground: Stadio Domenico Fiore
- Capacity: 6,500
- League: N/A
- 2012–13: Serie D Group F, 18th (relegated)

Associazione Sportiva Dilettantistica Città di Marino Calcio or known as Città di Marino, was an Italian association football club, based in Marino, in Metropolitan City of Rome Capital (formerly Province of Rome), Lazio region. It was founded in 1993. The club folded in 2013 after the club merged with a local side in Monterotondo, and relocated there to form A.S.D. Monterotondo Calcio. Marino had played in 2011–12 Serie D and 2012–13 Serie D seasons.

== History ==
Città di Marino was founded in 1993. The club was renamed from A.S.C. Marino Lepanto Onlus to A.S.D. Marino Res Blu in 2004, and then to A.S.D. Marino in 2005, and then to A.S.D. Città di Marino in 2008.

A.S.D. Città di Marino was a repechage to 2010–11 Eccellenza Lazio season, as the runner-up of the promotion play-offs of 2009–10 Promozione Lazio.

In the 2010–11 season, the club was promoted to Serie D as the runner-up of Coppa Italia Dilettanti. It is because the winner U.S. Ancona 1905 was promoted as the first place in Eccellenza Marche.

In mid-2013, after the relegation, Città di Marino merged with A.S.D. Atletico Monterotondo, a local side of Monterotondo. The new team became A.S.D. Monterotondo Calcio. The new registration number of the club was 937,688. In the same 2013–14 season, there was another namesake from Monterotondo, U.S.D. Città di Monterotondo.

== Namesake ==
There was another club from the same city, Marino Calcio 1926, as of 2015.

== Colours and badge ==
The team's colour were light blue and white. The club use the same crest as the city, with an additional Latin slogan Usque ad finem on it, means "to the very end".

== Honours ==
- Coppa Lazio:
  - Winners (1): 2010–11
- Coppa Italia Dilettanti
  - Runner-up (1) : 2010–11

== Stadium ==
Città di Marino played the home matches at the Stadio Domenico Fiore, with a capacity of 6,500 people.
