= SSD Eretum Monterotondo Calcio =

Italian football club

Eretum Monterotondo
- Full name: Società Sportiva Dilettantistica a r.l. Eretum Monterotondo Calcio
- Nickname(s): gialloblù (Yellow-Blue)
- Short name: Eretum Monterotondo
Founded
?	(Atletico Monterotondo)
2013	(merged with Città di Marino)
2016	(merged with Eretum)
- Ground: Stadio F. Cecconi
- League: Eccellenza Lazio (Group A)
- 2018–19: 5th, Eccellenza Lazio (Group A)
- Website: http://www.eretummonterotondo.it

Società Sportiva Dilettantistica a r.l. Eretum Monterotondo Calcio , known as just Eretum Monterotondo is an Italian football club based in Monterotondo, in the Metropolitan City of Rome Capital (former Province of Rome). Eretum Monterotondo was found in 2016 by the merger of A.S.D. Monterotondo Calcio and A.S.D. Eretum. A.S.D. Monterotondo Calcio itself, was founded in 2013 by the merger of A.S.D. Città di Marino Calcio and A.S.D. Atletico Monterotondo. However, the team considered itself as the successor of Polisportiva Monterotondo Calcio, that originally founded in 1935. That team, known as Polisportiva Monterotondo Lupa in 2013, was relocated to Maccarese to claim as the successor of another team, A.S. Giada Maccarese.

== History ==
A.S.D. Atletico Monterotondo was a team from Monterotondo.

In 2012–13 season, the club finished as the 10th in the group B of 2012–13 Prima Categoria Lazio, one position higher than A.S. Eretum. The division was the 8th highest level in the Italian football league pyramid and the 3rd level from the bottom at that time.

At the end of 2012–13 season, the major team of the city, Polisportiva Monterotondo Lupa, sold its position in Serie D, by relocated and renamed to Maccarese, as a replacement of A.S.D. Maccarese Calcio. Serie D, or the 5th highest division at that time, was one level below the lowest professional division, Lega Pro Seconda Divisione. However, at the same time, Atletico Monterotondo was merged with another team also from the province of Rome, A.S.D. Città di Marino Calcio. Città di Marino participated in 2012–13 Serie D and relegated to 2013–14 Eccellenza Lazio. The new major team of the city was denominated as A.S.D. Monterotondo Calcio. The new registration number of the club was 937,688.

In terms of city, only the team from Marino disappeared in the shuffles. The two relocations effectively made Maccarese "promoted" to Serie D by using the spot of Monterotondo Lupa; Monterotondo retained in Eccellenza Lazio by using the spot of Marino (as well as the jumping of Atletico Monterotondo from the 8th level to the 6th level). While the original spot of Maccarese in Promozione Lazio, had become A.S.D. Trastevere Calcio. Named after the city of Trastevere, A.S.D. Trastevere F.C., participated in the Terza Categoria Rome Group C, the lowest division of the whole football league pyramid in 2012–13 season.

In 2014 A.S.D. Monterotondo Calcio relegated from 2013–14 Eccellenza Lazio. However, the club later became a repechage of 2014–15 Eccellenza Lazio to fill the vacancy of Rieti.

In 2016, A.S.D. Monterotondo Calcio was merged with the aforementioned A.S.D. Eretum. The new registration number of the club was 945,120. The new crest of the new team, A.S.D. Eretum Monterotondo, featured year 2016 on it, instead of other year, such as the 2013 merger or the date of foundation of Polisportiva Monterotondo Calcio in 1935. The crest also resemble to the crest of the city.

Eretum Monterotondo changed its incorporation from associazione sportiva dilettantistica to società sportiva dilettantistica a responsabilità limitata in circa 2017. A name change to S.S.D. a r.l. Eretum Monterotondo Calcio, was also approved by the Italian Football Federation in 2017.

In June 2017, Eretum Monterotondo hired Fabrizio Perrotti as the head coach. In the next season he was hired by another Roman team Trastevere. Claudio Solimina was hired as the head coach of Eretum Monterotondo in June 2018.

== Stadium ==
Eretum Monterotondo played their home matches in the Stadio Fausto Cecconi. The stadium is named after Fausto Cecconi.

== Namesakes ==
In 2013–14 Eccellenza Lazio season, there was a namesake, U.S.D. Città di Monterotondo. Città di Monterotondo and [new] Monterotondo were in the same group. That team also participated in 2012–13 Eccellenza Lazio but in the group A; Monterotondo Lupa was in the group B.

In 2018–19 Eccellenza Lazio season, there was another namesake Real Monterotondo Scalo, located in Monterotondo Scalo frazione of Monterotondo. Real Monterotondo and Eretum Monterotondo are in the same group. Eretum Monterotondo lost the derby in home ground that season.

Another sports club, was renamed from Atletico-UISP Monterotondo S.r.l. to A.S.D. Atletico Monterotondo in September 2013, months after A.S.D. Atletico Monterotondo the football club had merged to form A.S.D. Monterotondo Calcio. Atletico-UISP Monterotondo claimed that the club was founded in 1979 as Polisportiva Atletico Monterotondo, and renamed to Atletico-UISP Monterotondo in 1997 after a merger. Atletico-USIP Monterotondo is a member of Italian Athletics Federation and Italian Cycling Federation. UISP itself stands for Unione Italiana Sport Per tutti.

Yet another club, A.S.D. F.C. Eretum, participated in 2019–20 Prima Categoria.

== See also ==
- Eretum, an ancient city that located in the area around modern-day Rome
