= Giorgio Santarelli =

Italian footballer

Personal information
- Full name: Giorgio Santarelli
- Date of birth: 5 June 1981 (age 45)
- Place of birth: Frosinone, Italy
- Height: 1.82 m (6 ft 0 in)
- Position: Defender

Team information
- Current team: Cavese

Senior career*
Years	Team	Apps	(Gls)
1998–01	Lazio	0	(0)
1999	→ Catania (loan)	11	(1)
2001–04	Avellino	17	(0)
2004	→ Rosetana (loan)	11	(0)
2004–06	Latina	45	(1)
2006–08	Cisco Roma	24	(0)
2008–09	Monopoli	33	(5)
2009–	Ascoli	3	(0)
2010–	→ Cavese (loan)	7	(0)
- * Club domestic league appearances and goals as of 12:49, 29 April 2010 (UTC)

Giorgio Santarelli (born 5 June 1981) is an Italian former footballer who played as a defender.

== Club career ==
Giorgio Santarelli signed his first professional footballing contract with Rome team Lazio, he then had a loan spell with former Italian Serie C2 club Catania, he then transferred to Serie C1 team Avellino. Giorgio moved to Rosetana followed by Latina, he then moved to Cisco Roma.
