= Yunsi Fei =

Chinese-American electronics engineer

Yunsi Fei is a Chinese and American electronics engineer focused on hardware security and on the energy efficiency of embedded systems. She is a professor of electrical and computer engineering and associate dean of faculty affairs in the Northeastern University College of Engineering in Boston, Massachusetts.

== Education and career ==
Fei was a student of electronic engineering at Tsinghua University, where she received a bachelor's degree in 1997 and a master's degree in 1999. She next went to Princeton University for doctoral study in electrical engineering; she completed her Ph.D. there in 2004. Her doctoral dissertation, System-level energy analysis and optimization of embedded systems, was supervised by Niraj Jha.

She became an assistant professor at the University of Connecticut before moving to her present position at Northeastern University in 2011.

== Recognition ==
Fei was named to the 2026 class of IEEE Fellows, "for contributions in side-channel analysis, protection of computing accelerators, and robust security evaluation".
