= Michael Girasole =

Italian footballer

Personal information
- Date of birth: 30 January 1989 (age 37)
- Place of birth: Vimercate, Italy
- Height: 1.80 m (5 ft 11 in)
- Position: Midfielder

Youth career
- 1997–2009: Atalanta

Senior career*
Years	Team	Apps	(Gls)
2008–2009	Atalanta	1	(0)
2009–2015	AlbinoLeffe	118	(17)
2009–2010	→ Canavese (loan)	17	(0)
2015–2016	Südtirol	26	(0)
2016–2017	Pro Piacenza	23	(0)
2017–2019	Trapani	20	(1)
2020–2021	Union San Giorgio Sedico		
2021	Real Calepina FC	11	(0)
2021–2022	ASD Zingonia Verdellino		
2022	SS Luciano Manara 1909		
Total		216	(18)
- * Club domestic league appearances and goals

Michael Girasole (born 30 January 1989) is an Italian former professional footballer who plays as a midfielder.

== Club career ==
=== Atalanta ===
Born in Vimercate, Lombardy, Girasole started his career with Atalanta. On 17 May 2009, Girasole made his professional debut in Serie A for Atalanta as a substitute replacing Daniele Capelli in the 91st minute of a 2–2 away draw against Juventus. One week later he was an unused substitute in a 2–2 home draw against Palermo.

=== AlbinoLeffe ===
In July 2009, Girasole was signed by Serie B side AlbinoLeffe in co-ownership, for €50,000. On 31 August 2009, he was loaned to Serie C2 side Canavese on a season-long loan deal, Girasole made 17 appearances on his loan spell.

Girasole returned to AlbinoLeffe, on 15 August 2010 he made his debut for AlbinoLeffe as a substitute replacing Davide Bombardini in the 79th minute of a 3–1 home win over Pescara in the second round of Coppa Italia. On 25 September, Girasole made his Serie B debut as a substitute replacing Dario Passoni in the 36th minute of a 2–0 away defeat against Padova. On 16 October he played his first entire match for AlbinoLeffe, a 1–0 away defeat against Vicenza. On 8 December he scored his first professional goal in the 17th minute of a 2–1 away win over Reggiana. On 11 June 2011 he scored a decisive goal in the 10th minute to save AlbinoLeffe from relegation to Serie C in a 2–2 home draw against Piacenza. Girasole ended his first season to AlbinoLeffe with 18 appearances, 2 goals and 1 assist. On 4 September, Girasole scored his third goal in the 89th minute of a 3–2 away win over Bari. On 6 January 2012 he received his first red card in the 43rd minute of a 0–0 away draw against Torino. He ended his second season with 37 appearances, 4 goals and 3 assists, but AlbinoLeffe was relegated in Serie C. On 2 September he made his debut in Serie C in a 1–1 home draw against Südtirol, he played the entire match. On 12 May 2013 he scored his 10th goal for AlbinoLeffe in the 61st minute of a 2–1 home win over Lecce. Girasole ended his third season to AlbinoLeffe with 31 appearances and 4 goals. On 6 October 2013, he scored his 15th goal for AlbinoLeffe in the 57th minute of a 2–2 home draw against Pro Vercelli. He ended his second season in Serie C and his fourth season to AlbinoLeffe with 28 appearances and 8 goals. In August 2014, Girasole injured his anterior cruciate ligament and he returned to the club in late October. On 19 December 2014, Girasole received his second red card in his career in the 81st minute of a 2–1 away defeat against Mantova. Girasole ended his fifth season to AlbinoLeffe with only 12 appearances. Girasole ended his contract to AlbinoLeffe with a total of 126 appearances, 18 goals and 4 assists.

=== Südtirol ===
On 14 July 2015, Girasole joined to Serie C side Südtirol as a free agent. On 2 August he made his debut for Südtirol in a 1–0 away win over Matera in the first round of Coppa Italia, he played the entire match, one week later he played in the second round, but the club lost 2–0 against Pescara. On 13 September he made his Serie C debut for Südtirol as a substitute replacing Alessandro Furlan in the 72nd minute of a 2–1 home win over Mantova. On 24 October he played his first entire match for Südtirol, a 3–1 away defeat against Cuneo. Girasole did not renovate his contract with Südtirol and he ended the season with 29 appearances and 7 assists.

=== Pro Piacenza ===
On 23 July 2016, Girasole joined Serie C side Pro Piacenza as a free agent. On 28 August he made his Serie C debut for Pro Piacenza as a substitute replacing Kalagna Gomis in the 68th minute of a 1–0 home defeat against Alessandria. On 14 September, Girasole played his first match as a starter for Pro Piacenza, a 1–0 away defeat against Olbia, he was replaced by Antonio Ferrara in the 76th minute. On 29 April 2017 he played his first and only entire match for Pro Piacenza, a 2–1 home win over Tuttocuoio. Girasole ended his season to Pro Piacenza with 23 appearances.

=== Trapani ===
On 25 August 2017, Girasole was signed by Serie C club Trapani on a free transfer. On 26 August he made his Serie C debut for Trapani as a substitute replacing Anthony Taugourdeau in the 76th minute of a 1–0 home win over Siracusa. On 2 September, Girasole played his first match as a starter for Trapani, a 2–1 away defeat against Lecce, he was replaced by Felice Evacuo in the 67th minute. On 18 November he scored his first goal for Trapani in the 55th minute of a 3–1 home win over Virtus Francavilla. Girasole ended this season with Trapani with only 11 appearances and 1 goal.

=== Later career ===
In the winter 2020, Girasole joined Eccellenza club Union San Giorgio, where he got his debut for the club on 2 February 2020. He left the club again during the season, but returned to the newly promoted Serie D club in August 2020. He left the club for the second time at the end of 2020.

At the beginning of January 2021, Girasole joined Real Calepina, a new club which was created in June 2020 and played in Serie D.

== Career statistics ==
=== Club ===
As of 22 June 2018

Club	Season	League			Cup		Europe		Other		Total	
Club	Season	League	Apps	Goals	Apps	Goals	Apps	Goals	Apps	Goals	Apps	Goals
Atalanta	2008–09	Serie A	1	0	0	0	—		—		1	0
Canavese (loan)	2009–10	Serie C2	17	0	0	0	—		—		17	0
AlbinoLeffe	2010–11	Serie B	15	2	3	0	—		—		18	2
AlbinoLeffe	2011–12	Serie B	36	4	1	0	—		—		37	4
AlbinoLeffe	2012–13	Serie C	30	4	1	0	—		—		31	4
AlbinoLeffe	2013–14	Serie C	26	8	2	0	—		—		28	8
AlbinoLeffe	2014–15	Serie C	12	0	0	0	—		—		12	0
Südtirol	2015–16	Serie C	26	0	2	0	—		—		28	0
Pro Piacenza	2016–17	Serie C	23	0	0	0	—		—		23	0
Trapani	2017–18	Serie C	11	1	0	0	—		—		11	1
Career total			197	19	9	0	—		—		206	19
