= Polisportiva Monterotondo Lupa =

Italian football club

Monterotondo Lupa
- Full name: Polisportiva Monterotondo Lupa S.r.l.
- Short name: Monterotondo
- Founded: 1935
- Dissolved: 2013 (relocated to Maccarese)
- Ground: Stadio Carlo Panichelli, Rome
- Capacity: 2,500
- Chairman: Fabio Della Longa
- League: N/A
- 2012–13: 1st, Eccellenza Lazio group B (promoted)
Home colours	Away colours

Polisportiva Monterotondo Lupa was an Italian association football club headquartered in Monterotondo, in the Province of Rome, but played their home match inside Rome. In 2013, the club relocated to Maccarese frazione of Fiumicino comune, a suburb of Rome, as a phoenix club of A.S.D. Maccarese Calcio, formerly known as A.S.D. Giada Maccarese Calcio. The club then known as Pol. Maccarese Giada. At the same time, a namesake was also found in 2013 in Monterotondo as A.S.D. Monterotondo Calcio.

== History ==
The club was founded in 1935 as Polisportiva Monterotondo Calcio. The club participated in Serie D a number of times. In 2010–11 Serie D, the club finished as the runner-up of promotional play-offs. The club speculated itself would be a repêchage candidate to 2011–12 Lega Pro Seconda Divisione.

In mid-2011, the club changed its name to Polisportiva Monterotondo Lupa.

In the season 2011–12 it was relegated to Eccellenza Lazio. In 2012–13 season the club won a promotion back to Serie D.

However, in July 2013, the club was relocated to Maccarese and renamed to Pol. Maccarese Giada.

== Colors and badge ==
The colors of the team are yellow and blue.

== Honours ==
- Eccellenza Lazio
  - (2) Winner (2012–13, 1999–2000)
