= Alessandro Fei =

Alessandro Fei may refer to:

- Alessandro Fei (painter) (1543–1592), Italian painter
- Alessandro Fei (volleyball) (born 1978), Italian volleyball player
