= Mirko Lamantia =

Italian footballer

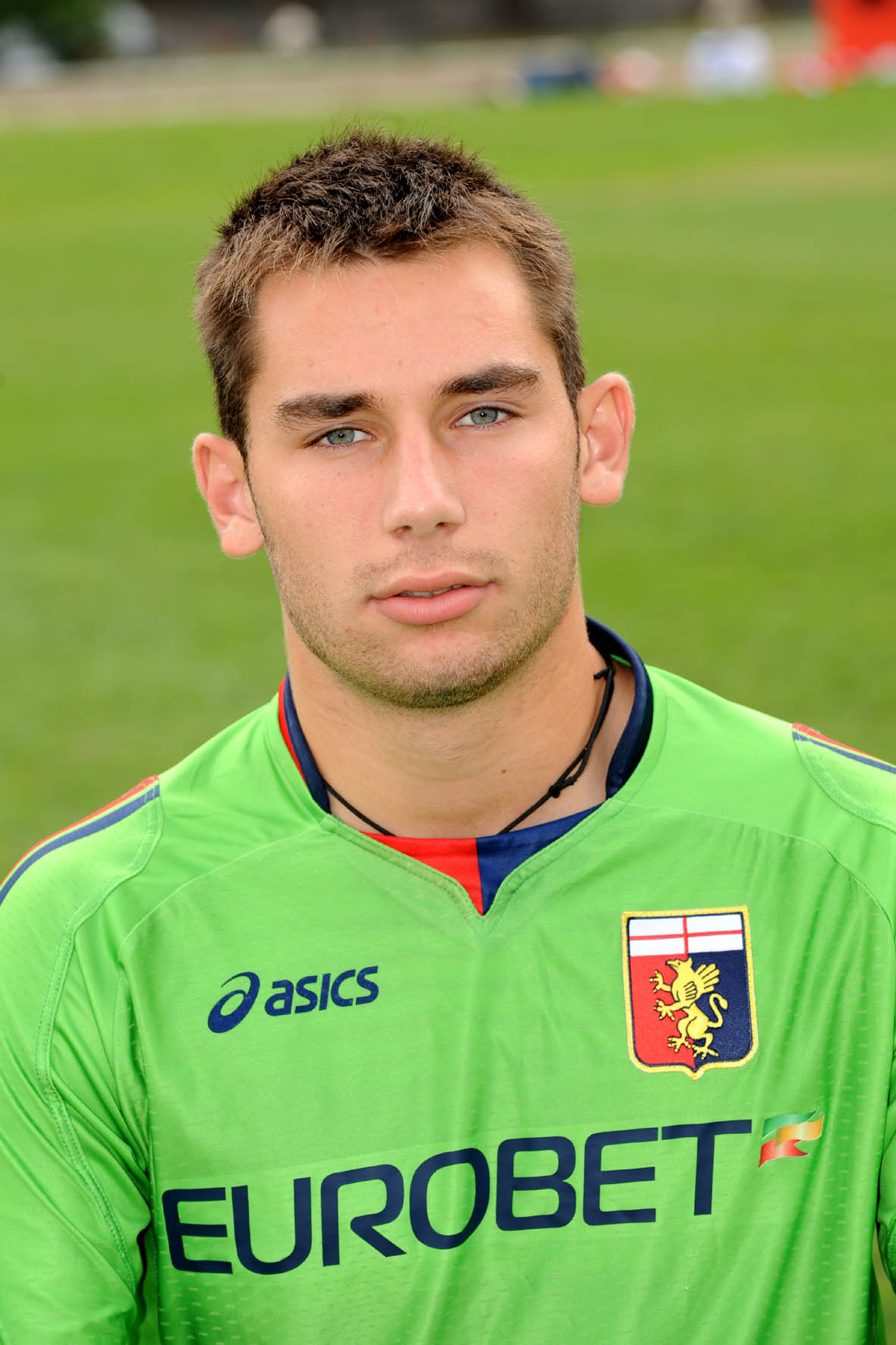
- Lamantia in 2008

Personal information
- Full name: Mirko Lamantia
- Date of birth: 1 March 1990 (age 36)
- Place of birth: Ponderano, Italy
- Position: Goalkeeper

Youth career
- Novara
- 2007–2009: Genoa

Senior career*
Years	Team	Apps	(Gls)
2006–2007	Novara	3	(0)
2009–2010	Borgosesia	20	(0)
- * Club domestic league appearances and goals

Mirko Lamantia (born 1 March 1990) is an Italian football goalkeeper.

== History ==
Mirko Lamantia (born 1 March 1990) was an Italian football goalkeeper.

Lamantia is a former Italian footballer who began his youth career with Novara, before earning a place in the First Team. He is notable for being one of the youngest goalkeepers in the history of the club to make his professional football debut, doing so at just 16 years old.

In the 2006-2007 season, Lamantia accumulated several appearances in both the Serie C1 championship and the Italian Cup, as well as joining the Serie C Under 21 national team. In 2007, there was the possibility of a transfer to Tottenham, but ultimately chose to continue his career in Italy.

In 2007-2008, the young goalkeeper moved to Genoa on a co-ownership basis, immediately after the club achieved promotion to Serie A. This season, he played the role of starter in the Primavera championship and as third goalkeeper in Serie A. Unfortunately, during this season, he suffered a serious shoulder injury which forced him to stay away from the field for almost 6 months. After his return from injury, he participated in the Viareggio championship and contributed to the victory of the Coppa Italia Primavera.

In June 2009, Genoa acquired full ownership of the player after purchasing the rights from Novara. However, due to some relapses in injuries, Lamantia gave up his place to new goalkeepers Lamanna and Perin in 2009. At the end of the year, he was sold to Borgosesia in Serie D, where he played a championship with 20 appearances, contributing to the team's salvation in the play-outs.

After this experience, Lamantia decided to abandon professional football. However, we saw him return to play in Eccellenza leagues later, wearing the shirts of Cerversama, Junior Biellese and Atletico Torino in several subsequent years.
