= Davide Tonani =

Italian footballer (born 1992)

Personal information
- Date of birth: 13 May 1992 (age 34)
- Place of birth: Mede, Italy
- Height: 1.84 m (6 ft 0 in)
- Position: Forward

Team information
- Current team: ASD Chiampo 1964

Youth career
- 2005–2010: Internazionale
- 2009–2010: → Chievo (loan)
- 2010–2011: Chievo
- 2011–2012: Pro Vercelli

Senior career*
Years	Team	Apps	(Gls)
2011–2012	Pro Vercelli	6	(0)
2012–2013	Chievo	0	(0)
2012–2013	→ Castiglione (loan)	10	(1)
2013	→ Fano (loan)	11	(4)
2013–2014	Borgomanero	29	(7)
2014–2015	Aurora Seriate	11	(2)
2015	Pro Sesto	11	(0)
2016	Caratese	11	(3)
2016	GS Grumellese Calcio	15	(3)
2016–2017	Arzignano Valchiampo	19	(5)
2017–2018	FC Calvi Noale	31	(6)
2018	GSD Ambrosiana	13	(5)
2018–2019	Milano City	21	(6)
2019–2020	Union Feltre ASD	27	(7)
2020–2025	Unione La Rocca Altavilla		
2025–	ASD Chiampo 1964		
- * Club domestic league appearances and goals as of 09:19, 9 February 2026 (UTC)

Davide Tonani (born 13 May 1992) is an Italian footballer who plays as a forward for ASD Chiampo 1964.

== Biography ==
=== Youth career ===
Born in Mede, Lombardy, Tonani joined Lombardy side F.C. Internazionale Milano in 2005. He played from Giovanissimi Regionali under-14 team to Allievi Nazionali under-17 team in 2009. He scored 12 goals in regular season, behind Simone Dell'Agnello and Giuseppe Angarano as third highest scorer of the team. The team finished as the runner-up. In August 2009 Inter decided to sell him to Chievo along with Filippo Fracaro (free), Edile Micheletti Awoh (loan) and youngster Francesco D'Ascanio (outright deal). He was the member of Primavera under-20 team along with Fracaro and Micheletti Awoh. In June 2010 he was signed in co-ownership deal for a peppercorn fee of €500. On 22 June 2011 Chievo signed Tonani and Rincón outright, while Michele Rigione joined Inter outright. Marco Andreolli also bought back by Chievo.

=== Pro Vercelli ===
On 19 August 2011 he joined Pro Vercelli in another co-ownership deal. He made his league debut on 25 September, substituted Pietro Iemmello in the second half. He also played in Campionato Berretti, the Lega Pro equivalent of Primavera League.
