= Giacomo Fei =

Italian professional football player

Personal information
- Date of birth: 10 February 1992 (age 34)
- Place of birth: Arezzo, Italy
- Position: Striker

Team information
- Current team: Arezzo

Youth career
- Fiorentina

Senior career*
Years	Team	Apps	(Gls)
2009–	Fiorentina	0	(0)
2009–	→ Sangiovannese (loan)	1	(0)
- * Club domestic league appearances and goals as of 16:37, 7 May 2010 (UTC)

Giacomo Fei (born 10 February 1992 in Arezzo) is an Italian professional football player currently playing for Lega Pro Seconda Divisione team Atletico Arezzo on loan from ACF Fiorentina.
