= AC Isola Liri =

Italian football club

Isola Liri
- Full name: Associazione Calcio Isola Liri
- Founded: 1925
- Ground: Stadio Conte Arduino Mangoni, Isola del Liri, Italy
- Capacity: 3,008
- Chairman: Luca Bianchi
- Manager: Alessandro Grossi
- League: Serie D/H
- 2015–16: Serie D/H, 11th
Home colours	Away colours

Associazione Calcio Isola Liri is an Italian association football club located in Isola del Liri, Lazio. It currently plays in Serie D.

== History ==
The club was founded on 1925.

=== Lega Pro Seconda Divisione ===
On 30 March 2008 Isola Liri mathematically won the Round G of Serie D, thus gaining promotion to Lega Pro Seconda Divisione and ensuring a historical first time into professional football in the 2008–09 season.

In the season 2011–12 it was relegated from Lega Pro Seconda Divisione B to Serie D.

== Colors and badge ==
Its colours are white and red.

== Stadium ==
The club plays its home matches at Stadio Conte Arduino Mangoni.

== Club records ==
Below is a table showing the participation of Isola Liri in the Italian leagues.

Level	Category	Participation	Debut	Final season	Total
4º	Lega Pro Seconda Divisione	4	2008–2009	2011–2012	6
4º	Serie D	2	2014–2015	2015–2016	6
5º	Campionato Interregionale	5	1987–1988	1991–1992	19
5º	Campionato Nazionale Dilettanti	7	1992–1993	1998–1999	19
5º	Serie D	7	2003–2004	2013–2014	19
