= 2014–15 Parma FC season =

Parma
2014–15 season
- President: -
- Manager: Roberto Donadoni
- Stadium: Stadio Ennio Tardini
- Serie A: 20th
- Coppa Italia: Quarter-finals
- Top goalscorer: League: Antonio Cassano (5); All: Antonio Cassano (5)
- Highest home attendance: 15,311 vs Juventus (11 April 2015, Serie A)
- Lowest home attendance: 1,083 vs Cagliari (14 January 2015, Coppa Italia)
- Average home league attendance: 11,904
Home colours	Away colours	Third colours

The 2014–15 season was Parma Football Club's sixth consecutive season back in Serie A after having been promoted from Serie B at the end of the 2008–09 season. The team competed in Serie A and the Coppa Italia. Parma were relegated at the end of the season, facing bankruptcy and finishing 20th, having been in 20th place for the greater part of the season. The 2014–15 season was thus the last in which Parma F.C. competed as an organisation.

== Players ==
=== Squad information ===
As of 26 January 2015.

Note: Flags indicate national team as defined under FIFA eligibility rules; some limited exceptions apply. Players may hold more than one non-FIFA nationality.

No.	Pos.	Nation	Player
2	DF	ITA	Mattia Cassani
3	DF	ALB	Andi Lila
4	DF	POR	Pedro Mendes
5	FW	ALG	Abdelkader Ghezzal
6	DF	ITA	Alessandro Lucarelli (captain)
7	MF	FRA	Jonathan Biabiany
8	MF	ITA	José Mauri
9	FW	ITA	Nicola Pozzi
10	FW	ALG	Ishak Belfodil
11	DF	ITA	Paolo De Ceglie (on loan from Juventus)
14	MF	ITA	Daniele Galloppa
15	DF	ITA	Andrea Costa
17	FW	ITA	Raffaele Palladino
18	MF	ITA	Massimo Gobbi
19	DF	BRA	Felipe
20	MF	MAR	Soufiane Bidaoui
21	MF	ITA	Francesco Lodi (on loan from Catania)

No.	Pos.	Nation	Player
22	GK	ITA	Alessandro Iacobucci
23	MF	ITA	Antonio Nocerino (on loan from Milan)
26	MF	POR	Silvestre Varela (on loan from Porto)
27	DF	ITA	Fabiano Santacroce
29	DF	ITA	Gabriel Paletta
30	MF	GHA	Afriyie Acquah
31	MF	KEN	McDonald Mariga
33	DF	ITA	Andrea Rispoli
70	MF	BRA	Lucas Souza
80	MF	CHI	Cristóbal Jorquera
83	GK	ITA	Antonio Mirante
88	FW	ITA	Massimo Coda
92	GK	CRO	Marijan Ćorić
99	FW	ITA	Antonio Cassano
—	GK	SVK	Pavol Bajza
—	FW	ITA	Leandro Campagna
—	FW	ITA	Daniele Gragnoli

=== Out on loan ===
Note: Flags indicate national team as defined under FIFA eligibility rules; some limited exceptions apply. Players may hold more than one non-FIFA nationality.

No.	Pos.	Nation	Player
1	GK	ITA	Alex Cordaz (at Crotone)
13	DF	MKD	Stefan Ristovski (at Latina)
26	MF	ITA	Gianluca Musacci (at Frosinone)
48	FW	ITA	Alberto Cerri (at Virtus Lanciano)
60	MF	SRB	Filip Janković (at Catania)
—	GK	ITA	Francesco Anacoura (at Pro Vercelli)
—	GK	ITA	Ivan Cacchioli (at L'Aquila)
—	GK	ITA	Alessandro Piacenti (at Vigor Lamezia)
—	GK	ITA	Mirko Pigliacelli (at Frosinone)
—	GK	ITA	Matteo Pisseri (at Juve Stabia)
—	GK	ITA	Nicola Ravaglia (at Cosenza)
—	GK	ITA	Mirko Ronchi (at Ascoli Picchio)
—	GK	ITA	Andrea Rossini (at Savona)
—	GK	ITA	Stefano Russo (at Salernitana)
—	DF	ITA	Errico Altobello (at Messina)
—	DF	ITA	Angelo Bencivenga (at Foggia)
—	DF	ITA	Dario Castaldo (at Lumezzane)
—	DF	ITA	Paolo Dametto (at Prato)
—	DF	ITA	Cristian Dell'Orco (at Ascoli Picchio)
—	DF	FRA	Abdelaye Diakité (at Teramo)
—	DF	ITA	Matteo Di Gennaro (at Renate)
—	DF	ITA	Alessandro Favalli (at Cremonese)
—	DF	MAR	Zouhair Feddal (at Palermo)
—	DF	ITA	Gian Marco Ferrari (at Crotone)
—	DF	ITA	Abel Gigli (at Crotone)
—	DF	ITA	Alberto Giuliatto (at Venezia)
—	DF	ITA	Matteo Legittimo (at S.P.A.L.)
—	DF	ITA	Giordano Maccarone (at L'Aquila)
—	DF	ITA	Marco Paolini (at San Marino)
—	DF	ITA	Andrea Rossi (at Latina)
—	DF	ITA	Cristiano Spirito (at Vigor Lamezia)
—	DF	ITA	Giuseppe Pacini (at Tuttocuoio)
—	DF	GRE	Lazaros Fotias (at (Greece) Zakynthos)
—	MF	BFA	Yves Benoit Bationo (at (France) Nîmes)
—	MF	ITA	Daniele Bazzoffia (at (Portugal) Olhanense)
—	MF	ITA	Luca Berardocco (at Crotone)

No.	Pos.	Nation	Player
—	MF	ITA	Andrea Casarini (at Bassano)
—	MF	ITA	Cosimo Chiricò (at Ascoli Picchio)
—	MF	ITA	Federico Di Francesco (at Cremonese)
—	MF	ITA	Andrea Dragonetti (at Salernitana)
—	MF	ITA	Francesco Finocchio (at Pisa)
—	MF	ITA	Manuel Giandonato (at Salernitana)
—	MF	ITA	Antonio Grillo (at Salernitana)
—	MF	ITA	Antonio Maglia (at Vigor Lamezia)
—	MF	ITA	Michele Moroni (at Cremonese)
—	MF	ITA	Stefano Morrone (at Pisa)
—	MF	ITA	Domenico Mungo (at Pistoiese)
—	MF	ITA	Gianni Munari (at (England) Watford)
—	MF	ITA	Cristian Pedrinelli (at Renate)
—	MF	ITA	Gabriele Puccio (at Vigor Lamezia)
—	MF	ITA	Stefano Rossini (at Vigor Lamezia)
—	MF	ITA	Mattia Sandrini (at Real Vicenza)
—	MF	SEN	Badara Sarr (at Catanzaro)
—	MF	ITA	Andrea Scicchitano (at Santarcangelo)
—	MF	ITA	Mattia Sprocati (at Pro Vercelli)
—	MF	TUN	Nabil Taïder (at (Bulgaria) Lokomotiv Sofia)
—	MF	HUN	Dániel Tőzsér (at (England) Watford)
—	MF	ITA	Gianluca Turchetta (at Matera)
—	FW	PAN	Jorman Aguilar (at (Portugal) Olhanense)
—	FW	ARG	Juan Antonio (at FeralpiSalò)
—	FW	ITA	Daniele Bernasconi (at L'Aquila)
—	FW	ITA	Camillo Ciano (at Crotone)
—	FW	ITA	Mauro Cioffi (at (Albania) Vllaznia)
—	FW	ITA	Riccardo Cocuzza (at Renate)
—	FW	BRA	Denilson Gabionetta (at Salernitana)
—	FW	ITA	Gianluca Lapadula (at Teramo)
—	FW	URU	Gonzalo Mastriani (at (Portugal) Olhanense)
—	FW	ITA	Gianvito Misuraca (at Pisa)
—	FW	ITA	Vito Falconieri (at Pavia)
—	FW	ITA	Alessandro Luparini (at Melfi)
—	FW	ITA	Giuseppe Caccavallo (at Casertana)

==== At Gubbio ====
Note: Flags indicate national team as defined under FIFA eligibility rules; some limited exceptions apply. Players may hold more than one non-FIFA nationality.

No.	Pos.	Nation	Player
—	DF	ITA	Alberto Galuppo
—	DF	ITA	Pietro Manganelli
—	MF	ITA	Daniele Casiraghi
—	MF	ITA	Tommaso Domini

No.	Pos.	Nation	Player
—	MF	ITA	Massimo Loviso
—	FW	ITA	Michele Bentoglio

==== At Paganese ====
Note: Flags indicate national team as defined under FIFA eligibility rules; some limited exceptions apply. Players may hold more than one non-FIFA nationality.

No.	Pos.	Nation	Player
—	DF	ITA	Tommaso Cancelloni
—	DF	ITA	Angelo Tartaglia
—	MF	ITA	Pietro Baccolo

No.	Pos.	Nation	Player
—	MF	ITA	Francesco Deli
—	FW	ITA	Cristiano Bussi

==== At (Slovenia) Gorica ====
Note: Flags indicate national team as defined under FIFA eligibility rules; some limited exceptions apply. Players may hold more than one non-FIFA nationality.

No.	Pos.	Nation	Player
—	DF	SVN	Matija Širok
—	DF	SVN	Alen Jogan
—	DF	ITA	Marco Modolo
—	DF	ITA	Lorenzo Pasqualini

No.	Pos.	Nation	Player
—	DF	BRA	Ronaldo Vanin
—	MF	SVN	Amedej Vetrih

== Transfers ==
=== In ===
Date	Pos.	Player	Age	Moving from	Fee	Notes	Source
20 June 2014	FW	(Algeria) Ishak Belfodil	22	(Italy) Internazionale		Co-ownership solved	
30 June 2014	GK	(Italy) Andrea Rossini	24	(Italy) Cesena		Return from loan	
30 June 2014	GK	(Italy) Alex Cordaz	31	(Slovenia) ND Gorica		Return from loan	
30 June 2014	GK	(Italy) Alessandro Iacobucci	23	(Italy) Latina		Return from loan	
30 June 2014	DF	(Italy) Luca Ceppitelli	24	(Italy) Bari		Return from loan	
30 June 2014	DF	(Morocco) Zouhair Feddal	25	(Italy) Siena		Return from loan	
30 June 2014	DF	(Italy) Alessandro Ligi	24	(Italy) Crotone		Return from loan	
30 June 2014	DF	(Slovenia) Matija Širok	23	(Slovenia) ND Gorica		Return from loan	
30 June 2014	DF	(Italy) Fabiano Santacroce	27	(Italy) Padova		Return from loan	
30 June 2014	DF	(Italy) Andrea Rispoli	25	(Italy) Ternana		Return from loan	
30 June 2014	DF	(Portugal) Pedro Mendes	23	(Italy) Sassuolo		Return from loan	
30 June 2014	DF	(North Macedonia) Stefan Ristovski	22	(Italy) Latina		Return from loan	
30 June 2014	DF	(Algeria) Djamel Mesbah	29	(Italy) Livorno		Return from loan	
30 June 2014	MF	(Brazil) Ze Eduardo	22	(Greece) OFI		Return from loan	
30 June 2014	MF	(Italy) Gianluca Musacci	27	(Italy) Padova		Return from loan	
30 June 2014	MF	(Greece) Sotiris Ninis	24	(Greece) PAOK		Return from loan	
30 June 2014	MF	(Morocco) Soufiane Bidaoui	24	(Italy) Crotone		Return from loan	
30 June 2014	FW	(Chile) Cristóbal Jorquera	25	(Turkey) Eskişehirspor		Return from loan	
30 June 2014	FW	(Algeria) Abdelkader Ghezzal	29	(Italy) Latina		Return from loan	
29 July 2014	DF	(Italy) Alessandro Ligi	24	(Italy) Crotone	€300,000	co-ownership solved	
7 August 2014	DF	(Italy) Luca Ceppitelli	24	(Italy) Bari	€1 million	co-ownership solved	
25 August 2014	MF	(Italy) Francesco Lodi	30	(Italy) Catania		Loan	
27 August 2014	DF	(Italy) Andrea Costa	28	(Italy) Sampdoria			
1 September 2014	DF	(Italy) Paolo De Ceglie	27	(Italy) Juventus			
1 September 2014	MF	(Brazil) Lucas Souza	27	(Portugal) Olhanense			
4 September 2014	MF	(Kenya) McDonald Mariga	27			Free Transfer	
1 January 2015	DF	(Albania) Andi Lila	28	(Greece) PAS Giannina			
9 January 2015	GK	(Slovakia) Pavol Bajza	23	(Italy) Crotone		Loan Return	
15 January 2015	MF	(Italy) Antonio Nocerino	29	(Italy) Milan		Loan	
20 January 2015	MF	(Portugal) Silvestre Varela	29	(Portugal) Porto		Loan	
20 January 2015	MF	(Uruguay) Cristian Rodríguez	29	(Spain) Atlético Madrid		Loan	

=== Out ===
Date	Pos.	Player	Age	Moving to	Fee	Notes	Source
15 May 2014	GK	(Italy) Nicola Pavarini	40			Retired	
15 June 2014	DF	(Italy) Cristian Molinaro	30	(Italy) Torino			
30 June 2014	DF	(Italy) Mattia Cassani	30	(Italy) Fiorentina		Loan Return	
30 June 2014	MF	(Italy) Ezequiel Schelotto	25	(Italy) Internazionale		Loan Return	
30 June 2014	MF	(Nigeria) Joel Obi	23	(Italy) Internazionale		Loan Return	
30 June 2014	MF	(Uruguay) Walter Gargano	29	(Italy) Napoli		Loan Return	
30 June 2014	MF	(Italy) Marco Parolo	29	(Italy) Lazio			
7 July 2014	MF	(Hungary) Dániel Tőzsér	29	(England) Watford		Loan	
10 July 2014	MF	(Italy) Mattia Sprocati	21	(Italy) Crotone		Loan	
29 July 2014	DF	(Italy) Alessandro Ligi	24	(Italy) Bari	Undisclosed		
30 July 2014	FW	(Italy) Alberto Cerri	18	(Italy) Virtus Lanciano		Loan	
30 July 2014	GK	(Slovakia) Pavol Bajza	22	(Italy) Crotone		Loan	
30 July 2014	GK	(Italy) Andrea Rossini	24	(Italy) Lupa Roma		Loan	
30 July 2014	MF	(Serbia) Filip Janković	19	(Italy) Catania		Loan	
4 August 2014	MF	(Italy) Gianni Munari	31	(England) Watford		Loan	
7 August 2014	DF	(Italy) Luca Ceppitelli	24	(Italy) Cagliari	€2.1 million		
27 August 2014	MF	(Italy) Marco Marchionni	34	(Italy) Sampdoria			
1 September 2014	DF	(Algeria) Djamel Mesbah	29	(Italy) Sampdoria			
1 September 2014	FW	(Italy) Amauri	34	(Italy) Torino			
14 January 2015	MF	(Italy) Mattia Sprocati	21	(Italy) Pro Vercelli		Loan	
3 February 2015	MF	(Senegal) Badara Sarr	20	(Italy) Catanzaro		Loan	

== Competitions ==
=== Serie A ===
==== League table ====
Pos	Team	Pld	W	D	L	GF	GA	GD	Pts	Qualification or relegation
16	Udinese	38	10	11	17	43	56	−13	41	
17	Atalanta	38	7	16	15	38	57	−19	37	
18	Cagliari (R)	38	8	10	20	48	68	−20	34	Relegation to Serie B
19	Cesena (R)	38	4	12	22	36	73	−37	24	Relegation to Serie B
20	Parma (L, R)	38	6	8	24	33	75	−42	19 (Note: Parma was docked 7 points for failing to pay over players' wages. Later the club announced bankruptcy, and it was recreated without professional status.)	Relegation to Serie D

Source: 2014–15 Serie A, 2014-15 Serie A classification.
Rules for classification: 1) points; 2) head-to-head points; 3) head-to-head goal difference; 4) goal difference; 5) number of goals scored; 6) draw. (Head-to-head record is applied for clubs with the same number of points only once all matches between said clubs have been played.).
(L) Liquidated after the season due to bankruptcy.; (R) Relegated

==== Results summary ====
Overall								Home						Away					
Pld	W	D	L	GF	GA	GD	Pts	W	D	L	GF	GA	GD	W	D	L	GF	GA	GD
38	6	8	24	33	75	−42	26	5	4	10	19	27	−8	1	4	14	14	48	−34

Last updated: 31 May 2015.
Source: Competitive matches

==== Results by round ====
Round	1	2	3	4	5	6	7	8	9	10	11	12	13	14	15	16	17	18	19	20	21	22	23	24	25	26	27	28	29	30	31	32	33	34	35	36	37	38
Ground	A	H	A	H	A	H	A	H	A	H	A	H	A	H	H	A	H	A	H	H	A	H	A	H	A	H	A	H	A	H	A	H	A	A	H	A	H	A
Result	L	L	W	L	L	L	L	L	L	W	L	L	L	L	D	L	W	L	L	L	L	L	D	W	L	D	L	L	D	W	D	W	L	L	D	L	D	D
Position	17	19	18	18	18	18	20	20	20	19	20	20	20	20	20	20	19	19	19	20	20	20	20	20	20	20	20	20	20	20	20	20	20	20	20	20	20	20

Updated to match(es) played on 31 May 2015. Source: Competitive matches
A = Away; H = Home; W = Win; D = Draw; L = Loss

==== Matches ====
31 August 2014 1	Cesena	1–0	Parma	Cesena
20:45 CEST (UTC+02:00)	Lucchini (yellow card) 25'; Rodríguez 38', (yellow card) 87'	Report	Jorquera (yellow card) 57'	Stadium: Stadio Dino Manuzzi; Attendance: 14,415; Referee: Sebastiano Peruzzo

14 September 2014 2	Parma	4–5	Milan	Parma
20:45 CEST (UTC+02:00)	Cassano 27'; Lucarelli (yellow card) 45', (goal) 73'; Felipe (yellow card) 24' (yellow-red card) 77', (goal) 51'; De Ceglie (yellow card) 70'; Acquah (yellow card) 85'; De Sciglio 89' (o.g.)	Report	Bonera (yellow card) 16' (yellow-red card) 58'; Bonaventura 25'; Honda 38'; Ménez 45' (pen.), 79'; De Jong (yellow card) 60', (goal) 68'	Stadium: Stadio Ennio Tardini; Attendance: 14,264; Referee: Davide Massa

21 September 2014 3	Chievo	2–3	Parma	Verona
12:30 CEST (UTC+02:00)	Izco 4'; Paloschi 82'; Frey (yellow card) 90'	Report	Lucarelli (yellow card) 32'; Belfodil (yellow card) 63'; Cassano 65', 77'; Gobbi (yellow card) 71'; Coda 75'; Galloppa (yellow card) 90+3'	Stadium: Stadio Marc'Antonio Bentegodi; Attendance: 10,000; Referee: Antonio Damato

24 September 2014 4	Parma	1–2	Roma	Parma
20:45 CEST (UTC+02:00)	Acquah (yellow card) 38'; De Ceglie 56'; Lodi (yellow card) 72'; Mirante (yellow card) 88'	Report	Ljajić 27'; Totti (yellow card) 42'; Torosidis (yellow card) 49'; Manolas (yellow card) 69'; Pjanić 88'	Stadium: Stadio Ennio Tardini; Attendance: 12,657; Referee: Paolo Mazzoleni

29 September 2014 5	Udinese	4–2	Parma	Udine
19:00 CEST (UTC+02:00)	Di Natale 28', 45'; Kone (yellow card) 38'; Widmer (yellow card) 45+3'; Heurtaux 58'; Théréau 83'	Report	Mauri 22'; Acquah (yellow card) 23' (yellow-red card) 77'; Cassano 45+4' (pen.)	Stadium: Stadio Friuli; Attendance: 8,652; Referee: Gianpaolo Calvarese

5 October 2014 6	Parma	1–2	Genoa	Parma
15:00 CEST (UTC+02:00)	Coda 66'; Lucarelli (yellow card) 75'; Gobbi (yellow card) 82'	Report	Roncaglia (yellow card) 35' (yellow-red card) 55'; Perotti 53'; Matri (yellow card) 76', (goal) 90+3'; Antonelli (yellow card) 89'	Stadium: Stadio Ennio Tardini; Attendance: 11,898; Referee: Daniele Doveri

19 October 2014 7	Atalanta	1–0	Parma	Bergamo
15:00 CEST (UTC+02:00)	Carmona (yellow card) 26'; Zappacosta (yellow card) 30'; Boakye 90'	Report	Mendes (yellow card) 64'; Mauri (yellow card) 70'; Galloppa (yellow card) 90+3'	Stadium: Stadio Atleti Azzurri d'Italia; Attendance: 14,944; Referee: Marco Guida

25 October 2014 8	Parma	1–3	Sassuolo	Parma
18:00 CEST (UTC+02:00)	Mendes (yellow card) 23'; De Ceglie (yellow card) 40'; Lucarelli (yellow card) 45'; Cassano 78'; Ristovski (yellow card) 90+3'	Report	Floccari 20'; Acerbi 23', (yellow card) 58'; Consigli (yellow card) 26'; Taïder 52'	Stadium: Stadio Ennio Tardini; Attendance: 11,313; Referee: Paolo Tagliavento

29 October 2014 9	Torino	1–0	Parma	Turin
20:45 CET (UTC+01:00)	Darmian 10'; Glik (yellow card) 30'	Report	Gobbi (yellow card) 19'; Santacroce (yellow card) 59'; Coda (yellow card) 74'; Cordaz (red card) 76'	Stadium: Stadio Olimpico di Torino; Attendance: 12,648; Referee: Gianluca Rocchi
Note: Alex Cordaz was sent off while a substitute.

2 November 2014 10	Parma	2–0	Internazionale	Parma
20:45 CET (UTC+01:00)	De Ceglie 5', 76'; Costa (yellow card) 12'; Lucarelli (yellow card) 18'; Mirante (yellow card) 70'	Report	Dodô (yellow card) 85'	Stadium: Stadio Ennio Tardini; Attendance: 13,539; Referee: Nicola Rizzoli

9 November 2014 11	Juventus	7–0	Parma	Turin
15:00 CET (UTC+01:00)	Llorente 23', 36'; Lichtsteiner 29'; Tevez 49', 58'; Morata 76', 88'	Report	Acquah (yellow card) 73'	Stadium: Juventus Stadium; Attendance: 39,097; Referee: Carmine Russo

23 November 2014 12	Parma	0–2	Empoli	Parma
15:00 CET (UTC+01:00)	Lodi (yellow card) 47'; Galloppa (yellow card) 54'; Acquah (yellow card) 57'; Belfodil (yellow card) 70'	Report	Vecino 45+1'; Tavano 56'; Maccarone (yellow card) 70'	Stadium: Stadio Ennio Tardini; Attendance: 10,625; Referee: Piero Giacomelli

30 November 2014 13	Palermo	2–1	Parma	Palermo
15:00 CET (UTC+01:00)	Dybala 37'; Barreto (yellow card) 65' (yellow-red card) 90', (goal) 73'; Vázquez (yellow card) 85'	Report	Palladino 40'; Costa (yellow card) 63'; Felipe (yellow card) 77' (yellow-red card) 80'	Stadium: Stadio Renzo Barbera; Attendance: 14,444; Referee: Massimiliano Irrati

7 December 2014 14	Parma	1–2	Lazio	Parma
15:00 CET (UTC+01:00)	Lodi (yellow card) 3'; Santacroce (yellow card) 33'; Palladino 45'; Gobbi (yellow card) 48'; Acquah (yellow card) 88'	Report	Biglia (yellow card) 10'; Mauri 45+3'; Anderson (yellow card) 58', (goal) 59'; Parolo (yellow card) 68'; Radu (yellow card) 89'	Stadium: Stadio Ennio Tardini; Attendance: 10,778; Referee: Marco Guida

14 December 2014 15	Parma	0–0	Cagliari	Parma
15:00 CET (UTC+01:00)	Rispoli (yellow card) 24'; Santacroce (yellow card) 64'; Acquah (yellow card) 81'; Lucarelli (yellow card) 90+3'	Report	Longo (yellow card) 21'; Conti (yellow card) 47'; Ekdal (yellow card) 84'; Cossu (yellow card) 88'	Stadium: Stadio Ennio Tardini; Attendance: 10,646; Referee: Paolo Valeri

18 December 2014 16	Napoli	2–0	Parma	Naples
21:00 CET (UTC+01:00)	Zapata 19'; Mertens 30' (pen.); Britos (yellow card) 48'	Report	Gobbi (yellow card) 30'; Galloppa (yellow card) 35'; Santacroce (yellow card) 46'; Mendes (yellow card) 82'	Stadium: Stadio San Paolo; Attendance: 20,799; Referee: Marco Di Bello

6 January 2015 17	Parma	1–0	Fiorentina	Parma
15:00 CET (UTC+01:00)	Costa 11'; De Ceglie (yellow card) 33'; Gobbi (yellow card) 35'; Lucarelli (yellow card) 66'; Bidaoui (yellow card) 78'; Cassano (yellow card) 87'; Mirante (yellow card) 88'	Report	Gonzalo (yellow card) 29' (yellow-red card) 79'; Savić (yellow card) 35' (yellow-red card) 86'	Stadium: Stadio Ennio Tardini; Attendance: 12,641; Referee: Antonio Damato

11 January 2015 18	Hellas Verona	3–1	Parma	Verona
15:00 CET (UTC+01:00)	Sala 39'; Toni 72'; Valoti (yellow card) 75', (goal) 90+1'	Report	Lodi 63'	Stadium: Stadio Marc'Antonio Bentegodi; Attendance: 15,915; Referee: Claudio Gavillucci

18 January 2015 19	Parma	0–2	Sampdoria	Parma
15:00 CET (UTC+01:00)	Lucarelli (yellow card) 43'; Paletta (yellow card) 60'	Report	Obiang (yellow card) 38'; Bergessio 54'; Soriano 70'	Stadium: Stadio Ennio Tardini; Attendance: 14,130; Referee: Andrea Gervasoni

25 January 2015 20	Parma	1–2	Cesena	Parma
15:00 CET (UTC+01:00)	Palladino (yellow card) 45+1'; Mauri (yellow card) 65'; Cascione 76' (o.g.); Varela (yellow card) 79'; Paletta (yellow card) 88'	Report	Pulzetti 21'; Cascione (yellow card) 24'; Renzetti (yellow card) 57'; Leali (yellow card) 68'; Krajnc (yellow card) 80'; Rodríguez 89'	Stadium: Stadio Ennio Tardini; Attendance: 11,791; Referee: Paolo Tagliavento

1 February 2015 21	Milan	3–1	Parma	Milan
20:45 CET (UTC+01:00)	Ménez 17' (pen.), 57'; Van Ginkel (yellow card) 24'; Destro (yellow card) 38'; Zaccardo 76'	Report	Gobbi (yellow card) 20'; Nocerino 24'; Lucarelli (yellow card) 31'; Mariga (yellow card) 62'	Stadium: San Siro; Attendance: 24,396; Referee: Daniele Doveri

11 February 2015 22	Parma	0–1	Chievo	Parma
18:00 CET (UTC+01:00)	Feddal (yellow card) 16'; Galloppa (yellow card) 26' (yellow-red card) 31'; Santacroce (yellow card) 35'; Nocerino (yellow card) 68'	Report	Paloschi (yellow card) 45+2'; Frey (yellow card) 49'; Zukanović 54'; Radovanović (yellow card) 71'	Stadium: Stadio Ennio Tardini; Attendance: 10,270; Referee: Gianluca Rocchi

15 February 2015 23	Roma	0–0	Parma	Rome
15:00 CET (UTC+01:00)		Report	Lucarelli (yellow card) 36'; Mauri (yellow card) 50'; Costa (yellow card) 75'; Mariga (yellow card) 87'	Stadium: Stadio Olimpico; Attendance: 37,539; Referee: Piero Giacomelli

8 March 2015 24	Parma	0–0	Atalanta	Parma
15:00 CET (UTC+01:00)	Lucarelli (yellow card) 2'; Rodríguez (yellow card) 78' (yellow-red card) 87'	Report	D'Alessandro (yellow card) 56'; Pinilla (yellow card) 90+2'	Stadium: Stadio Ennio Tardini; Attendance: 10,418; Referee: Marco Di Bello

15 March 2015 25	Sassuolo	4–1	Parma	Reggio Emilia
15:00 CET (UTC+01:00)	Acerbi (yellow card) 5'; Sansone 24', 36'; Berardi (yellow card) 38', (goal) 61' (pen.); Missiroli 65'	Report	Gobbi (yellow card) 23'; Lila 26'; Santacroce (yellow card) 28'; Mauri (yellow card) 52'; Mirante (red card) 60'; Galloppa (yellow card) 68'	Stadium: Mapei Stadium – Città del Tricolore; Attendance: 10,525; Referee: Angelo Cervellera

22 March 2015 26	Parma	0–2	Torino	Parma
20:45 CET (UTC+01:00)	Lucarelli (yellow card) 36' (yellow-red card) 36'; Cassani (yellow card) 45+1'; Jorquera (yellow card) 48'	Report	Maxi López 18'; Benassi (yellow card) 43'; El Kaddouri (yellow card) 45+1'; Basha 73'	Stadium: Stadio Ennio Tardini; Attendance: 10,145; Referee: Maurizio Mariani

4 April 2015 27	Internazionale	1–1	Parma	Milan
15:00 CEST (UTC+02:00)	Guarín 25'; Ranocchia (yellow card) 61'; Felipe (yellow card) 73'	Report	Lila 44'	Stadium: San Siro; Attendance: 33,175; Referee: Sebastiano Peruzzo

8 April 2015 28	Parma	1–0	Udinese	Parma
15:00 CET (UTC+01:00)	Mauri (yellow card) 21'; Varela (yellow card) 54', (goal) 70'	Report	Wagué (yellow card) 11'	Stadium: Stadio Ennio Tardini; Attendance: 9,772; Referee: Angelo Cervellera
Note: Postponed from 22 February due to Parma's financial troubles.

11 April 2015 29	Parma	1–0	Juventus	Parma
18:00 CEST (UTC+02:00)	Mendes (yellow card) 52'; Mauri 60'; Jorquera (yellow card) 77'; Gobbi (yellow card) 89'	Report	Marchisio (yellow card) 45'; Chiellini (yellow card) 51'; Ogbonna (yellow card) 88'	Stadium: Stadio Ennio Tardini; Attendance: 15,311; Referee: Andrea Gervasoni

15 April 2015 30	Genoa	2–0	Parma	Genoa
18:30 CEST (UTC+02:00)	Iago 14', (yellow card) 62'; Roncaglia (yellow card) 45'; Pavoletti 76'; Kucka (yellow card) 83'	Report	Lila (yellow card) 20'; Belfodil (yellow card) 55'; Nocerino (yellow card) 71'; Jorquera (yellow card) 80'; Lucarelli (yellow card) 84'	Stadium: Stadio Luigi Ferraris; Attendance: 17,568; Referee: Claudio Gavillucci
Note: Postponed from 1 March due to Parma's financial troubles.

19 April 2015 31	Empoli	2–2	Parma	Empoli
15:00 CEST (UTC+02:00)	Maccarone 32'; Tonelli 45'	Report	Lodi 19'; Mauri (yellow card) 62'; Belfodil 73'	Stadium: Stadio Carlo Castellani; Attendance: 7,767; Referee: Fabrizio Pasqua

26 April 2015 32	Parma	1–0	Palermo	Parma
15:00 CEST (UTC+02:00)	Nocerino 22' (pen.); Costa (yellow card) 27'; Feddal (yellow card) 57'; Gobbi (yellow card) 76'; Lila (yellow card) 83'	Report		Stadium: Stadio Ennio Tardini; Attendance: 10,921; Referee: Marco Di Bello

29 April 2015 33	Lazio	4–0	Parma	Rome
20:45 CEST (UTC+02:00)	Parolo 10'; Klose 13', (yellow card) 63'; Candreva 16'; Keita 81'	Report	Belfodil (yellow card) 20'; Mirante (yellow card) 27'; Varela (yellow card) 29'	Stadium: Stadio Olimpico; Attendance: 32,367; Referee: Gianpaolo Calvarese

4 May 2015 34	Cagliari	4–0	Parma	Cagliari
20:45 CEST (UTC+02:00)	Ekdal 3'; Farias 14'; M'Poku (yellow card) 35', (goal) 38'; Dessena (yellow card) 37'; Čop 63'; Barella (yellow card) 86'	Report	Coda (yellow card) 40'	Stadium: Stadio Sant'Elia; Referee: Massimiliano Irrati

10 May 2015 35	Parma	2–2	Napoli	Parma
18:00 CEST (UTC+02:00)	Palladino 9'; Mendes (yellow card) 22'; Jorquera 33'; Lila (yellow card) 52'	Report	Gabbiadini 28'; Mertens 72'; Albiol (yellow card) 82'	Stadium: Stadio Ennio Tardini; Attendance: 13,172; Referee: Piero Giacomelli

17 May 2015 36	Fiorentina	3–0	Parma	Florence
19:00 CEST (UTC+02:00)	Gonzalo 13'; Gilardino 30'; Salah 56'; Diamanti (yellow card) 81'	Report	Mendes (yellow card) 77'	Stadium: Stadio Artemio Franchi; Attendance: 27,179; Referee: Dino Tommasi

24 May 2015 37	Parma	2–2	Hellas Verona	Parma
15:00 CEST (UTC+02:00)	Nocerino 21'; Varela 36'; Lila (yellow card) 90'	Report	Obbadi (yellow card) 41'; Toni 42', 80' (pen.); Moras (yellow card) 51'	Stadium: Stadio Ennio Tardini; Attendance: 11,889; Referee: Daniele Minelli

31 May 2015 38	Sampdoria	2–2	Parma	Genoa
20:45 CEST (UTC+02:00)	Romagnoli 53'; De Silvestri 79'	Report	Palladino 75'; Jorquera (yellow card) 78'; Varela 88'	Stadium: Stadio Luigi Ferraris; Attendance: 20,913; Referee: Davide Massa

=== Coppa Italia ===
14 January 2015 Round of 16	Parma	2–1	Cagliari	Parma
18:00 CET (UTC+01:00)	Felipe (yellow card) 32'; Paletta 45'; Mariga (yellow card) 54'; Rispoli 84'	Report	Murru (yellow card) 24'; Barella (yellow card) 33'; González (yellow card) 58'; Sau 69'	Stadium: Stadio Ennio Tardini; Attendance: 1,083; Referee: Angelo Cervellera

28 January 2015 Quarter-finals	Parma	0–1	Juventus	Parma
20:45 CET (UTC+01:00)	Gobbi (yellow card) 15'; Paletta (yellow card) 61'	Report	Morata 89'	Stadium: Stadio Ennio Tardini; Attendance: 15,000; Referee: Sebastiano Peruzzo

== Statistics ==
	Total	Home	Away	Neutral
Games played	21	12	8	0
Games won	4	3	1	N/A
Games drawn	1	1	0	N/A
Games lost	16	8	8	N/A
Biggest win	2-0	2-0	2-3	N/A
Biggest loss	0-7	4-5	0-7	N/A
Biggest win (League)	2-0	2-0	2-3	N/A
Biggest win (Cup)	2-1	2-1	N/A	N/A
Biggest loss (League)	0-7	4-5	0-7	N/A
Biggest loss (Cup)	N/A	N/A	N/A	N/A
Clean sheets	3	3	0	N/A
Goals scored	21	14	7	N/A
Goals conceded	44	21	23	N/A
Goal difference	-23	-7	-16	N/A
Average GF per game	1	1.166	0.777	N/A
Average GA per game	2.10	2.08	2.55	N/A
Yellow cards	64	62	2	N/A
Red cards	4	4	0	N/A
Most appearances	A.Cassano (20)	A.Cassano (19)	Eleven Players (1)	N/A
Top scorer	A.Cassano (5)	A.Cassano (5)	Two Players (1)	N/A
Worst discipline	A.Acquah (10)	A.Acquah (10)	Two Players (1)	N/A
Penalties for	1	1	0	N/A
Penalties against	2	2	0	N/A
League points	10	7	3	N/A
Winning rate	19%	25%	11%	N/A

=== Appearances and goals ===
No.	Pos	Nat	Player	Total		Serie A		Coppa Italia	
No.	Pos	Nat	Player	Apps	Goals	Apps	Goals	Apps	Goals
Goalkeepers
22	GK	(Italy) ITA	Alessandro Iacobucci	7	0	5+2	0	0	0
83	GK	(Italy) ITA	Antonio Mirante	35	0	33	0	2	0
92	GK	(Croatia) CRO	Marijan Ćorić	0	0	0	0	0	0
Defenders
2	DF	(Italy) ITA	Mattia Cassani	18	0	13+5	0	0	0
3	DF	(Albania) ALB	Andi Lila	14	2	9+4	2	1	0
4	DF	(Portugal) POR	Pedro Mendes	23	0	17+4	0	2	0
6	DF	(Italy) ITA	Alessandro Lucarelli	29	1	28	1	1	0
11	DF	(Italy) ITA	Paolo De Ceglie	12	3	11	3	1	0
15	DF	(Italy) ITA	Andrea Costa	22	1	20+2	1	0	0
27	DF	(Italy) ITA	Fabiano Santacroce	17	0	12+3	0	0+2	0
28	DF	(Morocco) MAR	Zouhair Feddal	13	0	12+1	0	0	0
58	DF	(Italy) ITA	Mirko Esposito	1	0	0+1	0	0	0
Midfielders
7	MF	(France) FRA	Jonathan Biabiany	1	0	1	0	0	0
8	MF	(Argentina) ARG	José Mauri	33	2	29+4	2	0	0
14	MF	(Italy) ITA	Daniele Galloppa	19	0	8+9	0	2	0
18	MF	(Italy) ITA	Massimo Gobbi	34	0	30+3	0	1	0
21	MF	(Italy) ITA	Francesco Lodi	23	2	20+3	2	0	0
23	MF	(Italy) ITA	Antonio Nocerino	21	3	19+1	3	1	0
24	MF	(Uruguay) URU	Cristian Rodríguez	6	0	5	0	1	0
26	MF	(Portugal) POR	Silvestre Varela	20	3	19	3	1	0
30	MF	(Ghana) GHA	Afriyie Acquah	14	0	12+2	0	0	0
31	MF	(Kenya) KEN	McDonald Mariga	11	0	4+5	0	2	0
37	MF	(Italy) ITA	Jérémie Broh	1	0	0+1	0	0	0
80	MF	(Chile) CHI	Cristóbal Jorquera	17	1	14+3	1	0	0
Forwards
5	FW	(Algeria) ALG	Abdelkader Ghezzal	19	0	10+9	0	0	0
10	FW	(Algeria) ALG	Ishak Belfodil	23	1	13+10	1	0	0
17	FW	(Italy) ITA	Raffaele Palladino	23	4	16+6	4	1	0
34	FW	(Slovakia) SVK	Lukáš Haraslín	2	0	0+2	0	0	0
88	FW	(Italy) ITA	Massimo Coda	18	2	9+9	2	0	0
Players transferred out during the season
1	GK	(Italy) ITA	Alex Cordaz	0	0	0	0	0	0
9	FW	(Italy) ITA	Nicola Pozzi	4	0	0+3	0	0+1	0
11	FW	(Italy) ITA	Amauri	1	0	0+1	0	0	0
13	DF	(North Macedonia) MKD	Stefan Ristovski	6	0	4+2	0	0	0
19	DF	(Brazil) BRA	Felipe	12	1	11	1	1	0
20	MF	(Morocco) MAR	Soufiane Bidaoui	5	0	1+3	0	1	0
29	DF	(Italy) ITA	Gabriel Paletta	9	1	6+1	0	2	1
33	DF	(Italy) ITA	Andrea Rispoli	16	1	7+7	0	2	1
70	MF	(Brazil) BRA	Lucas Souza	4	0	2+1	0	0+1	0
99	FW	(Italy) ITA	Antonio Cassano	20	5	18+1	5	1	0

Last updated: 30 May 2015
Source: BDFutbol

=== Goalscorers ===
Place	Position	Number	Name	Serie A	Coppa Italia	Total
1	FW	99	Antonio Cassano	5	0	5
2	DF	11	Paolo De Ceglie	3	0	3
3	FW	88	Massimo Coda	2	0	2
3	FW	14	Raffaele Palladino	2	0	2
3			Own goal	2	0	2
6	DF	6	Alessandro Lucarelli	1	0	1
6	DF	19	Felipe	1	0	1
6	MF	8	José Mauri	1	0	1
6	MF	21	Francesco Lodi	1	0	1
6	DF	15	Andrea Costa	1	0	1
6	MF	23	Antonio Nocerino	1	0	1
6	DF	29	Gabriel Paletta	0	1	1
6	DF	33	Andrea Rispoli	0	1	1
			TOTALS	20	2	22

Last updated: 6 February 2015

=== Disciplinary record ===
No.	Pos.	Name	Serie A		Coppa Italia		Total	
No.	Pos.	Name	Booked	Sent off (straight red)	Booked	Sent off (straight red)	Booked	Sent off (straight red)
1	GK	Alex Cordaz	0	1	0	0	0	1
4	FW	Pedro Mendes	3	0	0	0	3	0
6	DF	Alessandro Lucarelli	9	0	0	0	9	0
8	MF	José Mauri	2	0	0	0	2	0
10	FW	Ishak Belfodil	2	0	0	0	2	0
11	DF	Paolo De Ceglie	3	0	0	0	3	0
13	DF	Stefan Ristovski	1	0	0	0	1	0
14	MF	Daniele Galloppa	4	0	0	0	4	0
15	DF	Andrea Costa	2	0	0	0	2	0
17	FW	Raffaele Palladino	1	0	0	0	1	0
18	DF	Massimo Gobbi	7	0	0	0	7	0
19	DF	Felipe	4	2	1	0	5	2
20	MF	Soufiane Bidaoui	1	0	0	0	1	0
21	MF	Francesco Lodi	3	0	0	0	3	0
26	MF	Silvestre Varela	1	0	0	0	1	0
27	DF	Fabiano Santacroce	4	0	0	0	4	0
29	DF	Gabriel Paletta	2	0	0	0	2	0
30	MF	Afriyie Acquah	8	1	0	0	8	1
31	MF	McDonald Mariga	1	0	1	0	2	0
33	DF	Andrea Rispoli	1	0	0	0	1	0
80	MF	Cristóbal Jorquera	1	0	0	0	1	0
83	GK	Antonio Mirante	3	0	0	0	3	0
88	FW	Massimo Coda	1	0	0	0	1	0
99	FW	Antonio Cassano	1	0	0	0	1	0
		TOTALS	65	4	2	0	67	4

Last updated: 6 February 2015
