= Mohamed Traoré (footballer, born 1991) =

Guinean footballer

Personal information
- Full name: Mohamed Lamine Traoré
- Date of birth: 13 October 1991 (age 35)
- Place of birth: Kindia, Guinea
- Height: 1.75 m (5 ft 9 in)
- Position: Defender

Team information
- Current team: Piccardo Traversetolo

Senior career*
Years	Team	Apps	(Gls)
2010–2014	Parma	0	(0)
2010–2011	→ South Tyrol (loan)	13	(0)
2011–2012	→ Foggia (loan)	19	(0)
2012–2013	→ Crotone (loan)	0	(0)
2013–2014	→ Gubbio (loan)	1	(0)
2014	→ South Tyrol (loan)	4	(0)
2014–2016	Cesena	0	(0)
2014–2015	→ Santarcangelo (loan)	29	(0)
2016–2019	Lentigione Calcio	82	(0)
2019–	Piccardo Traversetolo		

International career
2011	Guinea	1	(0)
- * Club domestic league appearances and goals as of 16:22, 20 February 2020 (UTC)

Mohamed Lamine Traoré (born 13 October 1991) is a Guinean footballer who plays as a defender for ASD Piccardo Traversetolo.

== Career ==
=== Parma ===
Born in Guinea, Traoré emigrated to the Emilia-Romagna region of Italy when he was around 10 years old; his younger brother Cherif became a professional rugby union player. He started his career at the reserve team of Parma; On 10 July 2010, he was signed by South Tyrol. (German: Südtirol, Italian: Alto Adige)

=== Foggia ===
In summer 2011 he was signed by Foggia in a co-ownership deal for €500. In June 2012 he returned to Parma for an undisclosed fee.

=== Crotone ===
On 26 July 2012, he was signed by F.C. Crotone in another co-ownership deal for €500.

=== Return to Parma ===
On 22 January 2013, he returned to Parma again for €500 in a 2 1/2-year contract.

Traoré was signed by Gubbio on 13 July 2013, along with Parma team-mate such as Baccolo, Caccavallo, Cacchioli, Ferrari, Luparini, Moroni, Sarr and Tartaglia. On 31 January 2014 Traoré returned to South Tyrol. South Tyrol also signed Riccardo Cocuzza from Parma via Gubbio as well as sent Andrea Molinelli to Gubbio.

=== Cesena ===
On 30 June 2014, the last day of 2013–14 financial year, Parma sold Cascione (€2.5M), Traoré (€1.5M) and Crialese (€1M) to Cesena, with Ravaglia (€2.5M), Lolli (€1.5M) and Turchetta (€1M) moved to opposite direction. Traoré signed a three-year contract. On 27 July 2014, Traoré was signed by Santarcangelo.

=== Piccardo Traversetolo ===
In July 2019, Traoré joined ASD Piccardo Traversetolo.
