= Francesco Rapisarda =

Italian footballer (born 1992)

Personal information
- Date of birth: 4 June 1992 (age 34)
- Place of birth: Catania, Italy
- Height: 1.76 m (5 ft 9 in)
- Position: Right-back

Team information
- Current team: Nissa
- Number: 31

Youth career
- Catania

Senior career*
Years	Team	Apps	(Gls)
2011–2012	Cosenza	30	(0)
2012–2013	L'Aquila	34	(1)
2013–2015	Lamezia	62	(2)
2015–2017	Lumezzane	57	(1)
2017–2020	Sambenedettese	123	(11)
2020–2022	Triestina	68	(4)
2022–2025	Catania	46	(7)
2025	Latina	12	(1)
2025–	Nissa	31	(1)
- * Club domestic league appearances and goals as of 30 September 2026

Francesco Rapisarda (born 4 June 1992) is an Italian footballer who plays as a right-back for Serie D club Nissa.

== Biography ==
Born in Catania, Sicily Island, Rapisarda started his career at Catania. He was transferred to fifth division (amateur) club Cosenza in 2011–12 Serie D season.

On 31 August 2012 he joined L'Aquila in the fourth division. Rapisarda played 30 times in 2012–13 Lega Pro Seconda Divisione. He made his club debut on 12 September, his only appearance in Lega Pro cup.

On 4 July 2013 Parma signed Rapisarda on free transfer, but on 9 July Rapisarda was transferred to Vigor Lamezia Calcio in co-ownership deal (€100,000). Parma also signed Antonio Maglia (undisclosed) and Giovanbattista Catalano from Lamezia (€110,000); Lamezia signed Matteo Bibba, Stefano Rossini and Diego De Giorgi in temporary deals from Parma.

In February 2014 Rapisarda was suspended 6 games for illegal contact with a staff of Martina in March 2013, the opponent of his team.

On 16 June 2014 Lamezia bought back Catalano for a peppercorn of €500 as well as Rapisarda for undisclosed fee. Rapisarda had a contract with Lamezia until 30 June 2016.

=== Lumezzane ===
Lumezzane signed Rapisarda on 29 July 2015.

=== Sambenedettese ===
Rapisarda joined Sambenedettese on 14 January 2017, with Giacomo Zappacosta moved to opposite direction.

=== Triestina ===
On 26 August 2020 he signed a 2-year contract with Triestina.

=== Catania ===
On 7 August 2022 he returned to his hometown by signing an annual contract with Catania.
