= Giovanbattista Catalano =

Italian footballer (born 1994)

Personal information
- Date of birth: 22 January 1994 (age 32)
- Place of birth: Lamezia Terme, Italy
- Height: 1.72 m (5 ft 8 in)
- Positions: Attacking midfielder; left winger

Team information
- Current team: Nissa
- Number: 10

Youth career
- Lamezia

Senior career*
Years	Team	Apps	(Gls)
2011–2013	Lamezia	28	(0)
2012–2013	→ Pescara (loan)	2	(0)
2013–2014	Parma	0	(0)
2013–2014	→ Rimini (loan)	3	(0)
2014	→ Lamezia (loan)	1	(0)
2014–2015	Lamezia	24	(0)
2015–2016	Potenza	7	(1)
2015–2016	Picerno	17	(2)
2016	San Severo	11	(0)
2016–2017	Anzio	17	(1)
2017	Lupa Roma	1	(0)
2017–2018	Roccella	18	(6)
2018–2019	Messina	21	(5)
2019–2020	Corigliano Calabro	23	(4)
2020	Messina	1	(0)
2020–2021	Licata	25	(3)
2021–2022	Città di Sant'Agata	37	(8)
2022	Ragusa	13	(1)
2022–2024	Santa Maria Cilento	50	(8)
2024–2025	Città di Sant'Agata	32	(8)
2025	Nola	6	(1)
2025–2026	Vigor Lamezia	25	(4)
2026–	Nissa	0	(0)
- * Club domestic league appearances and goals as of 30 September 2026

Giovanbattista Catalano (born 22 January 1994) is an Italian footballer who plays as a winger for Serie D club Nissa.

== Biography ==
=== Vigor Lamezia ===
Born in Lamezia Terme, Calabria, Catalano started his career at Vigor Lamezia. Despite he was a member of the under-17 youth team in 2010–11 season, Catalano also played 9 times in the second half of 2010–11 Lega Pro Seconda Divisione for the first team. Catalano occasionally played for the reserve team since the first half of that season. He infamously booked 6 times for the reserve. That season he was suspended once for the reserve and 3 games for the under-17 team. Catalano was suspended twice for the reserve, as well as added 6 more games in his first team accounts in 2011–12 Lega Pro Seconda Divisione, despite also booked once. In 2012–13 Lega Pro Seconda Divisione, Catalano made 13 fourth division appearances in the first half and just booked once. He also played in the Lega Pro cup, but again cautioned in the first match. On 31 January 2013 Catalano was signed by Pescara in temporary deal. Catalano was a member of the reserve, but also received call-up from the first team since May. Pescara certainly relegated after the match against Genoa. In the next match Catalano made his debut in Serie A as a substitute. Catalano also played the last round against Fiorentina.

=== Parma ===
On 5 July 2013 Catalano joined another Serie A club Parma in co-ownership deal for €110,000 in 2-year contract. Parma also signed Antonio Maglia from Lamezia Terme on 4 July for undisclosed fee. As part of the deal, Lamezia acquired Matteo Bibba, Diego De Giorgi, Stefano Rossini (loans) and Francesco Rapisarda (co-ownership for €100,000) from Parma, despite all 4 players in fact were free agents on 1 July 2013 (De Giorgi in 2012).

Catalano joined fourth division club Rimini on 2 September 2013. Catalano played 3 times and booked once for the group A club (northern side). On 23 January 2014, Catalano moved back to south for Lamezia in Group B. On 16 June 2014 Lamezia bought back Catalano for a peppercorn of €500 as well as Rapisarda for undisclosed fee.

=== Potenza ===
On 20 August 2015 Catalano signed for Potenza. He scored his first goal on 13 September against Manfredonia.

=== Picerno ===
In the second part of the season 2015-2016 he has played 17 games scoring 2 goals for Picerno.

=== San Severo ===
On 6 July 2016 Catalano signed for San Severo.

=== Later career ===
On 4 August 2019, it was confirmed that Catalano had joined Serie D club ASD Corigliano Calabro. In October 2020, he returned to his former club, Messina. However, less than a month later, he joined ASD Licata Calcio. In July 2021, Catalano joined Città Sant'Agata.

In the summer 2022, Catalano signed with Ragusa. He left the club in December 2022, after signing with Santa Maria Cilento.
