= Nicolò Lolli =

Italian footballer

Personal information
- Date of birth: 11 October 1994 (age 32)
- Place of birth: Forlì, Italy
- Position: Forward

Team information
- Current team: US Vighignolo Calcio

Youth career
- –2013: Cesena

Senior career*
| Years | Team | Apps | (Gls) |
| 2012–2014 | Cesena | 4 | (0) |
| 2013–2014 | → San Marino (loan) | 19 | (1) |
| 2014–2015 | Parma | 0 | (0) |
| 2015–2016 | Imolese | 9 | (0) |
| 2016–2017 | ASD Savignanese | 33 | (25) |
| 2017–2018 | ASD Calvairate | 0 | (10) |
| 2018–2019 | FC Cinisello | 0 | (17) |
| 2019–2020 | US Vighignolo Calcio | 0 | (16) |
| 2020–2021 | Tritium Calcio 1908 | 0 | (0) |
| 2021- | US Vighignolo Calcio | 0 | (6) |
- * Club domestic league appearances and goals

Nicolò Lolli (born 11 October 1994) is an Italian professional footballer who plays for Tritium Calcio 1908.

== Club career ==
Born in Forlì, Emilia–Romagna region, Lolli started his career at Romagnol Club Cesena. Lolli made his Serie A debut on 29 April 2012 as a substitute for Adrian Mutu, in the match against F.C. Internazionale Milano. Lolli wore no.45 shirt that season. At the end of the season, Cesena was relegated.

Lolli played three games in 2012–13 Serie B season. That season, he picked no.28 shirt previously owned by Yohan Benalouane.

On 5 August 2013, he was signed by San Marino Calcio. The club also signed Saša Čičarević, Yago Del Piero (Cesena/Inter), Marco Paolini (Parma/Cesena) and Stefano Sensi from Cesena. San Marino finished as Group A's 15th (out of 16th) of the 2013–14 Lega Pro Prima Divisione. However, the club was not relegated due to the merger of the two divisions of Lega Pro. That season, Cesena was also promoted to Serie A.

On 30 June 2014, the last day of the 2013–14 financial year, Ravaglia, Lolli, and Turchetta were sold to fellow Serie A club Parma, with Cascione, Traoré, and Crialese moved in the opposite direction.
