= Alessandro Ligi =

Italian footballer (born 1989)

Personal information
- Date of birth: 7 November 1989 (age 37)
- Place of birth: Sassocorvaro, Italy
- Height: 1.91 m (6 ft 3 in)
- Position: Centre back

Team information
- Current team: Lavarian Mortean Esperi

Youth career
- San Marino

Senior career*
Years	Team	Apps	(Gls)
2006–2011	San Marino	53	(1)
2007–2008	→ Bellaria (loan)	2	(0)
2008–2009	→ Triestina (loan)	0	(0)
2011–2013	Crotone	22	(0)
2013–2014	Parma	0	(0)
2013–2014	→ Crotone (loan)	28	(1)
2014–2016	Bari	14	(0)
2015	→ Entella (loan)	20	(0)
2015–2016	→ Avellino (loan)	15	(0)
2016	→ Vicenza (loan)	12	(0)
2016–2017	Cesena	38	(3)
2017–2020	Carpi	59	(0)
2019	→ Spezia (loan)	8	(0)
2020–2022	Triestina	82	(6)
2022–2026	Audace Cerignola	83	(3)
2026–	Lavarian Mortean Esperi	0	(0)
- * Club domestic league appearances and goals as of 1 May 2026

Alessandro Ligi (born 7 November 1989) is an Italian professional footballer who plays as a centre-back for Serie D club Lavarian Mortean Esperi.

== Club career ==
=== Parma ===
In July 2013, Ligi (€150,000), Denílson Gabionetta (€200,000), Francesco Checcucci (€200,000) and Giuseppe Caccavallo (€50,000) were sold to Parma, all in co-ownership deal except Checcucci; Crotone signed Tomislav Šarić (€200,000), Giuseppe Prestia (€50,000) and Caio Secco (€250) in exchange, also in co-ownership deals.

In April 2014, after a crash during the match, he suffered from collapsed lung.

In June 2014 Crotone acquired Lebran and Mantovani outright, while Parma acquired Caccavallo, Mauro Cioffi and Massimo Loviso outright, as well as bought back Prestia; the co-ownership of Denílson, Ligi, Šarić and Secco were renewed.

=== Bari ===
On 29 July 2014 he was signed by Bari on a 3-year contract from Parma and Crotone for an undisclosed fee (Crotone received €300,000). Earlier that month fellow Parma defender Luca Ceppitelli was recalled from Bari after the expire of the loan.

On 22 January 2015 Ligi went to Virtus Entella, with Leandro Rinaudo moving in the opposite direction.

On 6 July 2015 Ligi was signed by U.S. Avellino 1912 in a temporary deal.

On 1 February 2016 Ligi signed for Vicenza on a loan deal until 30 June 2016, with an option to make the deal permanent.

=== Cesena ===
On 22 July 2016 Ligi was signed by Cesena on a two-year deal.

=== Carpi ===
On 31 August 2017 Ligi was signed by fellow Serie B club Carpi on a three-year contract.

==== Spezia ====
On 31 January 2019, he joined Spezia on loan with a purchase option.

=== Serie C ===
On 2 September 2020 he signed a two-year contract with Triestina.

On 7 August 2022, he moved to Audace Cerignola.
