= Carlo Crialese =

Italian footballer (born 1992)

Personal information
- Date of birth: 14 November 1992 (age 34)
- Place of birth: Rome, Italy
- Height: 1.79 m (5 ft 10 in)
- Position: Left back

Team information
- Current team: Cittadella
- Number: 14

Youth career
- 2010: Atletico Roma

Senior career*
Years	Team	Apps	(Gls)
2011	Gaeta	14	(0)
2011–2012	Aprilia	19	(0)
2012–2013	Lamezia	32	(1)
2013–2014	Parma	0	(0)
2013–2014	→ Nocerina (loan)	14	(0)
2014–2017	Cesena	0	(0)
2014–2016	→ Cremonese (loan)	51	(1)
2016–2017	→ Bassano (loan)	34	(1)
2017–2023	Pro Vercelli	31	(1)
2017–2018	→ Juve Stabia (loan)	37	(2)
2018–2020	→ Entella (loan)	36	(0)
2020–2021	→ Perugia (loan)	25	(0)
2022–2023	→ Crotone (loan)	21	(1)
2023–2024	Crotone	18	(1)
2024–2025	Pescara	27	(0)
2025–	Cittadella	25	(0)
- * Club domestic league appearances and goals as of 29 April 2026

Carlo Crialese (born 14 November 1992) is an Italian professional footballer who plays as a left back for Serie C Group A club Cittadella.

== Club career ==
Crialese started his senior career at Italian Serie D club Gaeta. In 2011 Crialese joined Lega Pro Seconda Divisione club Aprilia. In 2012, he joined fellow fourth-tier club Lamezia. In 2013, he moved to the third tier club Nocerina, via Parma. Nocerina also signed Tozzi and Rosato from Parma. During the season, Nocerina was suspected of match-fixing after 8 players were injured, leaving not enough players for the rest of the match. Thus the club was expelled from the league and relegated. On 1 August 2014, the club was assigned to Eccellenza Campania, two tier below Lega Pro, as Lega Pro only had one unified division since the 2014–15 season. However, Crialese himself did not find any club for the second half of 2013–14 season.

=== Cesena ===
On 30 June 2014, the last day of 2013–14 financial year, Crialese, Emmanuel Cascione, Mohamed Traoré were sold from Parma to Serie A newcomers Cesena, with Nicola Ravaglia, Gianluca Turchetta and Nicolò Lolli moved to opposite direction. Crialese signed an initial three-year contract.

On 1 September 2014, he was signed by Cremonese. The loan deal was extended on 8 July 2015. He returned to Cesena for their pre-season camp on 14 July 2016.

However, on 25 July 2016, Crialese was signed by Bassano in another loan.

On 12 July 2017, he received a call-up from Cesena for their 2017 pre-season camp. However, he left the club less than a month of the new season.

=== Pro Vercelli ===
On 20 July 2017, Crialese joined Pro Vercelli, with Ernesto Starita moved to opposite direction. Crialese was immediately left for Serie C club Juve Stabia.

==== Loan to Virtus Entella ====
On 6 August 2018, he joined Serie C side Virtus Entella on a two-year loan deal. Virtus Entella was promoted to Serie B for the second season of his loan.

==== Loan to Perugia ====
On 6 August 2020, Crialese went to Perugia on loan.

=== Crotone ===
On 31 August 2022, Crialese joined Crotone on loan with a conditional obligation to buy. The conditions were fulfilled and he transferred to Crotone on a permanent basis.

=== Pescara ===
On 13 August 2024, Crialese moved to Pescara.
