= Pietro Baccolo =

Italian footballer

Personal information
- Date of birth: 21 June 1990 (age 36)
- Place of birth: Brescia, Italy
- Height: 1.87 m (6 ft 2 in)
- Position: Midfielder

Team information
- Current team: Padova (youth)

Youth career
- Padova

Senior career*
Years	Team	Apps	(Gls)
2007–2010	Padova	19	(2)
2010–2015	Parma	0	(0)
2010–2011	→ South Tyrol (loan)	10	(0)
2011–2012	→ Frosinone (loan)	25	(1)
2012–2014	→ Gubbio (loan)	37	(2)
2014–2015	→ Paganese (loan)	27	(0)
2015–2016	Messina	26	(0)
2016–2017	Catanzaro	12	(0)
2017	Teramo	11	(1)
2017–2018	Paganese	17	(0)
2018–2021	Clodiense	41	(4)
2021	Luparense	20	(3)
2021–2022	Albignasego		
2022–2023	Borgo Veneto		
2023–2024	Unione Cadeoneghe		

International career
2006	Italy U16	5	(0)
2006–2007	Italy U17	5	(0)
2008	Italy U19	1	(0)

Managerial career
- 2024–2025: Padova U17
- 2025–: Padova U13
- * Club domestic league appearances and goals

Pietro Baccolo (born 21 June 1990) is an Italian professional football manager and former professional player.

== Career ==
=== Player ===
Born in Brescia, Lombardy, Baccolo started his career at Veneto side Padova.

In January 2010, he was signed by Serie A club Parma in co-ownership deal as part of the deal that Daniele Vantaggiato went to the opposite direction. The deal of Vantaggiato was the registration rights of Baccolo plus €1 million cash. Both club also retained the 50% registration rights. Half of Baccolo's rights was valued for €1.5 million and Vantaggiato for €2.5 million at that time,. made both club mutually had a selling profit despite transfer spending increased. However the transfer fee would amortize over the contract length instead (4 1/2-year for Baccolo, €666,667 a year). Combined with the cost and profit, the transfer made both clubs had a positive net effect in the first season and followed by a negative effect (amortization) in the second year.

He wore no.16 of Parma's first team. However Baccolo was unable to prove his "market" value.

On 21 July 2010, he was loaned to South Tyrol. Parma also subsidized the South Tyrol-based side premi di valorizzazione €96,000.

In June 2011 both clubs gave up the remain 50% registration rights for free. However, that made Parma had a financial income for Baccolo (€1.5 million) and cost for Vantaggiato (€2.5 million) and vice versa in Padova side.

In July 2011 he was loaned to Serie B club Frosinone along with Alessio Manzoni.

In July 2012 he was signed by Serie C1 club Gubbio in another temporary deal. Parma again subsidized Gubbio €200,000 as premi di valorizzazione. On 5 July 2013, the loan was renewed, with Gubbio also signed Cacchioli, Sarr and Tartaglia from Parma on the same day.

On 27 August 2014, he was signed by Paganese in temporary deal, re-joining Tartaglia. Paganese also signed Bussi, Caccavallo, Cancelloni and Deli from Parma. During his loans Baccolo also extended his contract with Parma, lasting until 30 June 2017.

On 1 October 2018, he joined Serie D club Clodiense.

In 2021 playing for Luparense in Italian 4th Division.

From 2021 at 2024 he playing for Albignsego, Cadoneghe and Borgo Veneto.

=== Manager ===
He has been coaching the youth teams of Padova since 2024.
