= Tomislav Šarić =

Croatian footballer (born 1990)

Personal information
- Full name: Tomislav Šarić
- Date of birth: 24 July 1990 (age 36)
- Place of birth: Brežice, Slovenia
- Height: 1.86 m (6 ft 1 in)
- Position: Midfielder

Team information
- Current team: Inker Zaprešić
- Number: 24

Youth career
- 1999–2008: Inter Zaprešić

Senior career*
Years	Team	Apps	(Gls)
2008–2013	Inter Zaprešić	127	(17)
2013	Parma	0	(0)
2013–2016	Crotone	1	(0)
2014–2015	→ Pistoiese (loan)	13	(0)
2015	→ Savoia (loan)	17	(1)
2015–2016	→ Osijek (loan)	26	(2)
2016	Split	1	(0)
2016–2018	Inter Zaprešić	55	(5)
2018–2020	Riga	34	(2)
2020–2022	RFS	72	(14)
2023	Jarun	15	(0)
2023–	Inker Zaprešić	2	(0)

International career
2011–2012	Croatia U21	4	(0)
- * Club domestic league appearances and goals as of 19 June 2023

Tomislav Šarić (born 24 June 1990) is a Croatian footballer who plays as a midfielder for Inker Zaprešić.

== Club career ==
=== Inter Zapresic ===
Šarić is a product of the Inter Zaprešić youth academy, debuting for their first team in 2008, aged 18. Becoming a standard fixture in the club's first team, he was made captain in 2012. He went on the collect more than 100 caps in the four years he spent at the club.

=== Crotone ===
In April 2013, Serie A team Parma signed Šarić on a free transfer. In July 2013 Šarić was signed by Crotone in Serie B in a co-ownership deal in a 3-year contract, for €200,000, with Alessandro Ligi (50% rights for €150,000), Denílson (50% rights for €200,000) and Francesco Checcucci (100% rights for €200,000) moved to Parma. In June 2014 the co-ownership was renewed. However, in summer 2014 it was terminated in favor Crotone for free, with Denílson and Alessandro Ligi moved to Parma outright, for €200,000 and €300,000 respectively.

On 26 August 2014 Šarić was loaned out to Italian club Pistoiese. In July 2015, he arrived at NK Osijek on a one-year loan.

=== Later years ===
On 13 June 2016 Šarić was signed by Split on a 2-year contract. After having made a single appearance for Split, he returned to his former club Inter Zaprešić on 31 August 2016. In June 2018, he switched to Latvian club Riga FC.

== Career statistics ==
As of 26 May 2013

Club	Season	League		Domestic		International		Other		Total	
Club	Season	Apps	Goals	Apps	Goals	Apps	Goals	Apps	Goals	Apps	Goals
Inter Zaprešić	2008–09	14	1	0	0	0	0	0	0	14	1
Inter Zaprešić	2009–10	26	1	0	0	0	0	0	0	26	1
Inter Zaprešić	2010–11	28	1	0	0	0	0	0	0	28	1
Inter Zaprešić	2011–12	28	6	1	0	0	0	0	0	29	6
Inter Zaprešić	2012–13	31	8	1	0	0	0	0	0	32	6
Total in Croatia		127	17	2	0	0	0	0	0	129	17
Career total		127	17	2	0	0	0	0	0	129	17

== International career ==
He is also capped at Croatia U21.
