= Checcucci =

Checcucci is an Italian surname. Notable people with the surname include:

- Francesco Checcucci (born 1989), Italian footballer
- Maurizio Checcucci (born 1974), Italian sprinter
