= 2003–04 Reggina Calcio season =

Reggina
2003–04 season
- Chairman: Pasquale Foti
- Manager: Franco Colomba; Giancarlo Camolese
- Serie A: 14th
- Coppa Italia: Last 16
- Top goalscorer: Francesco Cozza (8); David Di Michele (8)

Reggina Calcio did renew its Serie A contract on the second consecutive occasion, ensuring the longest stay of the Calabrian club in the top division of Italian football. With returning coach Franco Colomba not being successful in his third stay at the club, Giancarlo Camolese guided the side to 13th place in the league. With only 29 goals scored, Reggina relied heavily on its defence for the survival, and Martin Jiránek plus defensive midfielder Davide Baiocco strengthened their reputations. After the season, Baiocco returned to Juventus, who in turn loaned him out to Reggina's arch-rivals Messina, newcomers for the 2004–05 season, setting up the first Messina strait derby in the highest division ever.

== Squad ==
=== Goalkeepers ===
- (Italy) Emanuele Belardi
- (Czech Republic) Martin Lejsal
- (Italy) Ferdinando Coppola

=== Defenders ===
- (Italy) Gianluca Comotto
- (Italy) Gianluca Falsini
- (Italy) Ivan Franceschini
- (Italy) Andrea Sottil
- (Italy) Stefano Torrisi
- (Czech Republic) Martin Jiránek
- (Italy) Simone Giacchetta
- (Colombia) Gonzalo Martínez
- (Italy) Giovanni Morabito

=== Midfielders ===
- (Italy) Davide Baiocco
- (Paraguay) Carlos Paredes
- (Japan) Shunsuke Nakamura
- (Honduras) Julio León
- (Italy) Giacomo Tedesco
- (Italy) Giandomenico Mesto
- (Brazil) Mozart
- (Italy) Francesco Cozza

=== Attackers ===
- (Italy) Roberto Stellone
- (Italy) Emiliano Bonazzoli
- (Italy) Stefano Dall'Acqua
- (Italy) David Di Michele

== Serie A ==
Pos	Team	Pld	W	D	L	GF	GA	GD	Pts	Qualification or relegation
11	Brescia	34	9	13	12	52	57	−5	40	
12	Bologna	34	10	9	15	45	53	−8	39	
13	Reggina	34	6	16	12	29	45	−16	34 (Note: Reggina finished ahead of Siena on head-to-head points: Reggina 2–1 Siena, Siena 0–0 Reggina.)	
14	Siena	34	8	10	16	41	54	−13	34	
15	Perugia (R)	34	6	14	14	44	56	−12	32	Relegation play-off

Source: Almanacco Illustrato del Calcio – La Storia 1898-2004, Panini Edizioni, Modena, September 2005
Rules for classification: 1) points; 2) tiebreaker for relevant positions 3) head-to-head points and goal difference; 4) head-to-head goals scored; 5) goal difference; 6) number of goals scored.
(R) Relegated

=== Matches ===
- Reggina-Sampdoria 2-2
- 1-0 Francesco Cozza (5)
- 2-0 David Di Michele (41)
- 2-1 Fabio Bazzani (64)
- 2-2 Aimo Diana (73)
- Empoli-Reggina 1-1
- 0-1 Mozart (27)
- 1-1 Antonio Di Natale (41)
- Brescia-Reggina 4-4
- 1-0 Luigi Di Biagio (9)
- 1-1 Shunsuke Nakamura (23 pen)
- 1-2 Emiliano Bonazzoli (39)
- 2-2 Andrea Caracciolo (51)
- 3-2 Antonio Filippini (52)
- 3-3 Andrea Sottil (61)
- 3-4 Shunsuke Nakamura (72)
- 4-4 Fabio Petruzzi (86)
- Reggina-Juventus 0-2
- 0-1 Marco Di Vaio (13)
- 0-2 Pavel Nedvěd (49)
- Perugia-Reggina 0-0
- Reggina-Siena 2-1
- 1-0 Mozart (22)
- 2-0 Julio León (90 + 3)
- 2-1 Tore André Flo (94)
- Reggina-Ancona 0-0
- Roma-Reggina 2-0
- 1-0 Vincenzo Montella (17)
- 2-0 John Carew (81)
- Reggina-Modena 1-1
- 1-0 Stefano Dall'Acqua (31)
- 1-1 Nicola Campedelli (45)
- Inter-Reggina 6-0
- 1-0 Fabio Cannavaro (33)
- 2-0 Obafemi Martins (43)
- 3-0 Andy van der Meyde (49)
- 4-0 Francisco Farinós (60)
- 5-0 Julio Cruz (66)
- 6-0 Christian Vieri (75)
- Reggina-Bologna 0-0
- Udinese-Reggina 1-0
- 1-0 Carsten Jancker (87)
- Reggina-Chievo 0-0
- Parma-Reggina 1-2
- 0-1 David Di Michele (27)
- 1-1 Alberto Gilardino (85 pen)
- 1-2 Francesco Cozza (90 + 2)
- Reggina-Lazio 2-1
- 0-1 Fabio Liverani (16)
- 1-1 David Di Michele (60)
- 2-1 Francesco Cozza (71)
- Milan-Reggina 3-1
- 0-1 Stefano Torrisi (2)
- 1-1 Kaká (8)
- 2-1 Kaká (55)
- 3-1 Andrea Pirlo (71 pen)
- Reggina-Lecce 1-3
- 0-1 Valeri Bojinov (2)
- 1-1 Francesco Cozza (26)
- 1-2 Javier Chevantón (49)
- 1-3 Valeri Bojinov (60)
- Sampdoria-Reggina 2-0
- 1-0 Fabio Bazzani (45)
- 2-0 Fabio Bazzani (47)
- Reggina-Empoli 2-0
- 1-0 Francesco Cozza (50 pen)
- 2-0 David Di Michele (89 pen)
- Reggina-Brescia 0-0
- Juventus-Reggina 1-0
- 1-0 Enzo Maresca (51)
- Reggina-Perugia 1-2
- 0-1 Zé Maria (20)
- 1-1 Francesco Cozza (53 pen)
- 1-2 Dario Hübner (90 + 2)
- Siena-Reggina 0-0
- Ancona-Reggina 1-1
- 1-0 Maurizio Ganz (5)
- 1-1 David Di Michele (87)
- Reggina-Roma 0-0
- Modena-Reggina 1-2
- 0-1 Emiliano Bonazzoli (16)
- 0-2 David Di Michele (45 + 1)
- 1-2 Diomansy Kamara (50)
- Reggina-Inter 0-2
- 0-1 Emiliano Bonazzoli (42 og)
- 0-2 Adriano (90 + 3)
- Bologna-Reggina 2-2
- 0-1 David Di Michele (8)
- 0-2 Roberto Stellone (30)
- 1-2 Tomas Locatelli (43)
- 2-2 Claudio Bellucci (67)
- Reggina-Udinese 0-1
- 0-1 Vincenzo Iaquinta (77)
- Chievo-Reggina 0-0
- Reggina-Parma 1-1
- 0-1 Mark Bresciano (9)
- 1-1 Stefano Torrisi (48)
- Lazio-Reggina 1-1
- 1-0 Claudio López (23)
- 1-1 Francesco Cozza (53 pen)
- Reggina-Milan 2-1
- 1-0 David Di Michele (8)
- 2-0 Francesco Cozza (30 pen)
- 2-1 Andriy Shevchenko (52)
- Lecce-Reggina 2-1
- 1-0 Javier Chevantón (11)
- 1-1 Stefano Dall'Acqua (32)
- 2-1 Daniele Franceschini (38)

=== Topscorers ===
- (Italy) David Di Michele 8
- (Italy) Francesco Cozza 8
- (Italy) Emiliano Bonazzoli 2
- (Italy) Stefano Dall'Acqua 2
- (Brazil) Mozart 2
- (Italy) Stefano Torrisi 2
- (Japan) Shunsuke Nakamura 2

== Sources ==
- RSSSF - Italy 2003/04
