= Daniel Maa Boumsong =

Cameroonian footballer

Personal information
- Full name: Daniel Maa Boumsong
- Date of birth: 20 March 1987 (age 39)
- Place of birth: Ngambe, Cameroon
- Height: 1.84 m (6 ft 0 in)
- Position: Midfielder

Youth career
- 2004: Cameroon Douala

Senior career*
Years	Team	Apps	(Gls)
2005–2007	Internazionale	1	(0)
2006–2007	→ Treviso (loan)	3	(0)
2007–2009	Treviso	0	(0)
2007	→ Internazionale (loan)	0	(0)
2007–2008	→ Pistoiese (loan)	2	(0)
2008–2009	→ Rovigo (loan)	16	(0)
2009–2010	Sporting Terni		
2010–2012	Noto		
2012–2013	SSD Subasio		
2013	Manduria Sport		
2015–2016	ASD La Sabina		
2016	Vigor Acquapendente		
2016–2018	ASD La Sabina		
2018	Trodica Calcio 1968		
2018–2019	SSD Bomarzo		
2019–2020	ASD Montello Calcio		
Total		22	(0)
- * Club domestic league appearances and goals

Daniel Maa Boumsong (born 20 March 1987) is a Cameroonian former professional footballer who played as a midfielder.

== Career ==
=== Inter Milan ===
Born in Ngambe, Maa Boumsong joined Internazionale in 2005, age 18. He arrived Italy for 2004 Torneo di Viareggio and escaped from the squad to seek asylum. Due to FIGC regulation, he could only signed by an Italian club after 1 year legal residence, which he trained with a Novara local teams before joined Inter. Maa Boumsong was included in the first team at the end of 2004–05 season, playing in end-season and pre-season friendlies. He also named in UEFA Champions League 25-men senior squad, as he was not eligible to List B. A regular in the Primavera youth team, Maa Boumsong made his competitive debut on 30 November 2005, winning Parma in 2005–06 Coppa Italia. One week later, he made his Champions League/European debut against Rangers. He only able to make his Serie A debut near the end of the season, which he was the starting midfielder. That season he won Coppa Italia with both first team and the Primavera team. Later, the FIGC also assigned Inter the 2005–06 Serie A title following the 2006 Italian football scandal.

=== Treviso ===
At the start of 2006–07 season, Maa Boumsong at first left for Spezia in July, but on 31 August left for Treviso, along with Alex Cordaz (in co-ownership deal).

On 11 January 2007 he returned to Inter, but along with Leonardo Bonucci, was sold to Treviso in co-ownership deal. Half of Maa Boumsong's contract was tagged for €100,000 at that time. Both players would formally become players of Treviso on 1 July 2007. With Inter Primavera team, Maa Boumsong finished as the runner-up of Coppa Italia Primavera but winning Campionato Nazionale Primavera.

However Maa Boumsong was excluded from Treviso's Serie B plan. He left for Pistoiese before returned to Treviso in January 2008.

Despite the co-ownership deal of Maa Boumsong was renewed in June 2008, Maa Boumsong joined Treviso permanently for an additional €250,000 fee on 1 September. Inter signed Yago Del Piero from Treviso on the same day.

Maa Boumsong then left for another Lega Pro clubs Rovigo. He played 16 games in the Lega Pro Seconda Divisione. In July 2009, Treviso bankrupted, he became a free agent.

=== Serie D teams ===
Maa Boumsong joined a Serie D team in 2009–10 season. In September 2010 he joined Noto.

== Honours ==
Inter

- Serie A: 2005–06
- Coppa Italia: 2005–06

Inter Primavera

- Coppa Italia Primavera: 2006
- Campionato Nazionale Primavera: 2007
