= Piacenti =

Piacenti is an Italian surname. Notable people with the surname include:

- Alessandro Piacenti (born 1992), Italian footballer
- Erin Piacenti, victim of the 2026 Times Square stabbing attack
- Gesualdo Piacenti (born 1954), Italian footballer
- Kirsten Aschengreen Piacenti (1929-2021), Danish art historian and museum director
- Melchiorre Piacenti (born 1966), Italian footballer
