= Alessandro Piacenti =

Italian footballer (born 1992)

Personal information
- Date of birth: 24 August 1992 (age 34)
- Place of birth: Terni, Italy
- Height: 1.87 m (6 ft 2 in)
- Position: Goalkeeper

Senior career*
Years	Team	Apps	(Gls)
2010–2012	Ternana	0	(0)
2010–2012	→ Todi (loan)	37	(0)
2012–2013	Foligno	26	(0)
2013–2015	Parma	0	(0)
2013–2014	→ Ascoli (loan)	1	(0)
2014–2015	→ Lamezia (loan)	35	(0)
2015–2016	Perugia	0	(0)
2016–2017	Ternana	0	(0)
- * Club domestic league appearances and goals as of 26 March 2017

Alessandro Piacenti (born 24 August 1992) is an Italian footballer who plays a goalkeeper.

== Biography ==
Born in Terni, Umbria, Piacenti started his senior career at non-professional club Todi. In 2012, he was signed by Serie C2 club Foligno (in co-ownership deal with Ternana), where he was the first choice keeper. On 21 June 2013 Foligno acquired him outright. He was immediately sold to Parma.

=== Parma ===
In summer 2013 he was signed by Serie A club Parma, but immediately left for Ascoli in temporary deal. However, since the arrival of Stefano Russo also from Parma, Piacenti became an understudy. On 9 January 2014 Piacenti was signed by Vigor Lamezia, with Antonio Torcasio moved to Parma, but remains at Lamezia on loan.

On 8 July 2014 Piacenti's loan was renewed. Lamezia also signed Spirito, Maglia, Puccio and Rossini from Parma on the same day.
