= Angelo Tartaglia (footballer) =

Italian footballer (born 1992)

Personal information
- Date of birth: 30 September 1992 (age 34)
- Place of birth: Naples, Italy
- Height: 1.82 m (6 ft 0 in)
- Position: Defender

Team information
- Current team: Monterosi
- Number: 16

Youth career
- Mariano Keller

Senior career*
Years	Team	Apps	(Gls)
2010–2011	Viribus Unitis	26	(1)
2011–2013	Andria	12	(1)
2013–2015	Parma	0	(0)
2013–2014	→ Gubbio (loan)	27	(0)
2014–2015	→ Paganese (loan)	35	(2)
2015–2016	Fidelis Andria	33	(1)
2016–2020	Novara	34	(1)
2016–2017	→ Fidelis Andria (loan)	32	(4)
2018	→ Fidelis Andria (loan)	6	(0)
2020–2021	Triestina	31	(5)
2021–	Monterosi	68	(1)
- * Club domestic league appearances and goals as of 6 May 2024

Angelo Tartaglia (born 30 September 1992) is an Italian footballer who plays as a defender for Monterosi.

== Career ==
Born in Naples, Campania, Tartaglia started his career at Italian Serie D club Viribus Unitis, located within the Naples metropolitan area. On 6 July 2011 he was signed by Italian third division Andria (along with Meccariello), where Tartaglia scored in his league debut on 6 May 2012.

Tartaglia played 11 games in the 2012–13 Lega Pro Prima Divisione season. Tartaglia became a free agent after Andria bankrupted in summer 2013.

=== Parma ===
In July 2013, Tartaglia was signed by Parma F.C. on a free transfer. On 5 July 2013 he was farmed to Gubbio along with Sarr, Cacchioli and Baccolo. On 22 July 2014, Tartaglia, Caccavallo, Bussi and Deli were signed by Paganese in temporary deal from Parma.

On 21 July 2015, he joined Fidelis Andria on free transfer.

=== Triestina ===
On 29 January 2020, Tartaglia moved to Triestina.

=== Monterosi ===
On 26 August 2021, he signed a two-year contract with Monterosi.
