= Giacomo Zappacosta =

Italian footballer (born 1988)

Personal information
- Date of birth: 21 April 1988 (age 38)
- Place of birth: Chieti, Italy
- Height: 1.75 m (5 ft 9 in)
- Position: Midfielder

Team information
- Current team: ASD Ugento Calcio

Youth career
- –2007: Pescara
- 2007–2008: → Fiorentina (loan)

Senior career*
Years	Team	Apps	(Gls)
2007–2011	Pescara	21	(0)
2008–2009	→ Pro Patria (loan)	28	(1)
2011–2013	Barletta	17	(0)
2012–2013	→ Lecce (loan)	13	(2)
2014–2015	L'Aquila	7	(0)
2015	Catanzaro	13	(0)
2015–2016	Martina Franca	12	(0)
2016	Lupa Roma	13	(0)
2016–2017	Sambenedettese	0	(0)
2017	Lumezzane	4	(0)
2017–2018	Francavilla	16	(1)
2018–2019	Rotonda	11	(0)
2019–2020	Brindisi	18	(0)
2020–2021	Nardò	15	(0)
2021–2022	Brindisi	28	(1)
2022–2023	Gravina	12	(1)
2023–2024	Gallipoli	10	(0)
2024–2025	Canosa Calcio 1948		
2025–	ASD Ugento Calcio		

International career
2007–2009	Italy U20 Lega Pro	3	(0)
- * Club domestic league appearances and goals as of 20 February 2026

Giacomo Zappacosta (born 21 April 1988) is an Italian footballer who plays as a midfielder for ASD Ugento Calcio.

== Club career ==
=== Pescara ===
Born in Chieti, Abruzzo, Zappacosta started his professional career at Pescara. He climbed from Allievi Nazionali under-17 team (2003–05), Berretti under-18 team (2005–06), to the Primavera under-20 team in 2006, where he spent with the reserve team (the Primavera) until January 2008. He also played a few times for the first team since the last few rounds of 2006–07 Serie B season.

In January 2008 he was sold to Fiorentina in co-ownership deal for €275,000, (plus minor cost about €20,000) where he spent half season in its reserve (the Primavera team). In July 2008 he left for Pro Patria. In June 2009 Pescara bought back Zappacosta for €67,000. Zappacosta played 17 times in 2009–10 Lega Pro Prima Divisione, winning the promotion playoffs. However, he did not made any appearances in 2010–11 Serie B.

=== Barletta ===
In January 2011 he left for Barletta. Despite only played 7 times in the second half of season, Barletta excised the option to sign Zappacosta in another co-ownership deal on 27 May, for a peppercorn fee of €250. In June 2012 Pescara gave up the remain 50% registration rights for free.

In the summer of 2012, he joined Lega Pro Prima Divisione side Lecce in temporary deal following their relegation from the Serie A and subsequent expulsion from the Serie B. On 2 June 2013 he had an anterior cruciate ligament injury during the promotion playoffs against Virtus Entella.

On 28 August 2013 he was released from his contract.

=== L'Aquila & Catanzaro ===
In summer 2014 he was signed by L'Aquila. On 21 January 2015 he was signed by Catanzaro.

=== Martina & Lupa Roma ===
He played at Martina Franca and Lupa Roma.

=== Lumezzane ===
Zappacosta joined Lumezzane on 14 January 2017 with Francesco Rapisarda moved to opposite direction.

=== Serie D ===
He played in the lower Italian series at Brindisi, Rotonda and Nardò.

== International career ==
Zappacosta capped for the Italy U-20 Lega Pro team in 2007–09 International Challenge Trophy. He also played in 2008–09 Mirop Cup against Croatia twice.
