= Gianluca Turchetta =

Italian footballer

Personal information
- Date of birth: 29 May 1991 (age 35)
- Place of birth: Ravenna, Italy
- Height: 1.77 m (5 ft 10 in)
- Positions: Left winger; forward

Team information
- Current team: Tre Penne
- Number: 27

Youth career
- Cesena

Senior career*
Years	Team	Apps	(Gls)
2010–2014	Cesena	1	(0)
2010–2012	→ Bellaria (loan)	41	(5)
2013–2014	→ Südtirol (loan)	28	(3)
2014–2015	Parma	0	(0)
2014–2015	→ Matera (loan)	8	(0)
2015	→ Barletta (loan)	14	(3)
2015–2016	Forlì	25	(4)
2016–2017	Maceratese	32	(3)
2017–2018	Lecce	0	(0)
2017–2018	→ Casertana (loan)	35	(8)
2018–2021	Südtirol	63	(7)
2021	→ Casertana (loan)	17	(4)
2021–2022	Imolese	18	(4)
2022	Foggia	13	(3)
2022–2024	Casertana	37	(4)
2024–2025	Mestre	33	(6)
2025–	Tre Penne	21	(3)
- * Club domestic league appearances and goals as of 25 June 2026

Gianluca Turchetta (born 25 May 1991) is an Italian professional footballer who plays as a left winger or forward for Tre Penne.

== Career ==
=== Cesena ===
Born in Ravenna, Romagna, Turchetta started his career at Romagnol club Cesena. He spent 2 seasons in the minor club of the region, Bellaria from 2010 to 2012. Turchetta had a total of 41 appearances in Lega Pro Seconda Divisione for the club. He was suspended once (on 22 April) due to transfer agent irregularity.

In July 2012, Turchetta was included in Cesena's pre-season camp. Turchetta was awarded no.18 shirt of the first team. Turchetta made his Serie B debut on 1 September 2012, against Vicenza. On 31 January 2013, he was signed by Lega Pro Prima Divisione club South Tyrol (German: Südtirol, Italian: Alto Adige). On 3 July 2013, the temporary deal was renewed. The club failed to win the promotion playoffs to Serie B, while Cesena won the promotion playoffs to Serie A.

=== Parma ===
On 30 June 2014, the last day of 2013–14 financial year, Ravaglia, Turchetta and Lolli were sold to fellow Serie A club Parma for a total of €5 million, with Cascione, Traoré and Crialese moved to opposite direction, also for €5 million. Turchetta signed a three-year contract.

Turchetta left for Matera in a temporary deal in the same transfer window. On 20 January 2015, he was signed by Barletta, also in a temporary deal. On 25 June Turchetta became a free agent after the bankruptcy of Parma.

=== Return to Casertana ===
On 31 December 2020 he returned to Casertana on loan.

=== Imolese ===
On 19 August 2021, he joined Imolese.

=== Foggia ===
On 28 January 2022, he signed with Foggia.

=== Second return to Casertana ===
On 22 July 2022, Turchetta returned to Casertana once more, now in Serie D.
