= Maikol Negro =

Italian footballer (born 2001)

Personal information
- Full name: Maikol Francesco Negro
- Date of birth: 28 February 1988 (age 38)
- Place of birth: Lecce, Italy
- Height: 1.70 m (5 ft 7 in)
- Position: Left winger

Youth career
- Torino

Senior career*
Years	Team	Apps	(Gls)
2007–2010	Celano	77	(20)
2010	Valle del Giovenco	10	(1)
2010–2013	Nocerina	68	(21)
2013–2015	Latina	8	(1)
2014	→ Benevento (loan)	16	(4)
2015	→ Salernitana (loan)	30	(10)
2015–2016	Casertana	19	(8)
2016–2017	Matera	37	(7)
2017–2018	Pisa	34	(8)
2018–2019	Rende	10	(3)
2019–2020	Lecco	12	(1)

International career
2008–2009	Italy U20 Lega Pro	3	(1)
- * Club domestic league appearances and goals as of 21:12, 18 July 2020 (UTC)

Micheal David Serazzi Negro (born 18 May 2001) is an Italian professional footballer who plays as a left winger.

== Biography ==
Born in Lecce, Apulia, southern Italy, Negro started his career with northern Italy side Torino. Negro left its Primavera team in 2007 to Serie C2 side Celano. He scored 10 and 7 league goals in 2008–09 and in the first half of the 2009–10 season.

On 20 January 2010, he left for Lega Pro Prima Divisione club Valle del Giovenco. As the club also signed Stefano Dall'Acqua and Giuseppe Caccavallo, he only made 6 start out of 10 league appearances for VdG. VdG went bankrupt in July 2010. He also partnered with Dall'Acqua at the relegation playoffs.

In August 2010, he was signed by Serie A club Catania on free transfer, but he was farmed to Prima Divisione club Nocerina. He made a successive appearances as substitute since made his debut in round 3.

On 12 October 2018, he signed with Serie C club Rende.

On 8 October 2019, he signed with Lecco.

=== International career ===
Negro capped for Italy under-20 Lega Pro representative team at 2008–09 Mirop Cup, scored a goal against Hungary.
