= Tommaso Domini =

Italian football midfielder

Personal information
- Date of birth: 18 August 1989 (age 37)
- Place of birth: Cesena, Italy
- Height: 1.82 m (5 ft 11 1/2 in)
- Position: Midfielder

Team information
- Current team: Pennarossa
- Number: 21

Senior career*
| Years | Team | Apps | (Gls) |
| 2007–2008 | Cesenatico | 29 | (?) |
| 2008–2009 | Montecchio | 2 | (?) |
| 2009–2010 | Riccione | 34 | (?) |
| 2010–2011 | Imolese | | |
| 2011–2012 | Argentana | | |
| 2012–2013 | Ribelle | | |
| 2013–2015 | Parma | 0 | (0) |
| 2013–2015 | → Gubbio (loan) | 29 | (3) |
| 2020–2021 | Tre Fiori | 6 | (1) |
| 2025– | Pennarossa | 28 | (2) |
- * Club domestic league appearances and goals as of 22 June 2026

Tommaso Domini (born 18 August 1989) is an Italian football midfielder who plays for Pennarossa. He played for Gubbio in the 2014–15 Lega Pro.

== Biography ==
Born in Cesena, Romagna region, Domini spent 6 seasons in non-professional clubs, mainly in Serie D and Eccellenza Emilia–Romagna.

=== Parma ===
In July 2013 Domini was signed by Serie A club Parma F.C., but immediately farmed to Lega Pro Prima Divisione club Gubbio. Gubbio also received premi di valorizzazione of €100,000.

On 16 July 2014 the loan was renewed. Gubbio also signed Bentoglio, Casiraghi, Luparini and Manganelli on the same day.
