= Michele Bentoglio =

Italian footballer

Personal information
- Date of birth: 30 November 1993 (age 32)
- Place of birth: Calcinate, Italy
- Position: Forward

Senior career*
Years	Team	Apps	(Gls)
2011–2012	Sarnico	?	(13+)
2012–2015	Parma	0	(0)
2012–2013	→ FeralpiSalò (loan)	11	(1)
2013	→ Saint-Christophe VdA (loan)	8	(0)
2013–2014	→ L'Aquila (loan)	2	(0)
2014–2015	→ Gubbio (loan)	1	(0)
- * Club domestic league appearances and goals

Michele Bentoglio (born 30 November 1993) is an Italian footballer.

== Career ==
In January 2012, Bentoglio moved from Sarnico to Parma on loan until the end of the season. This move was made permanent at the end of the season in July. For the following season, he was loaned to FeralpiSalò and then to Saint-Christophe Aosta Valley.

On 16 July 2014 Bentoglio left for Gubbio along with Daniele Casiraghi, Tommaso Domini, Alessandro Luparini and Pietro Manganelli in temporary deals.
