= 2012–13 Coppa Italia Lega Pro =

Tournament details
- Country: Italy
- Teams: 69

Final positions
- Champions: Latina (1st title)
- Runners-up: Viareggio

Tournament statistics
- Matches played: 78
- Goals scored: 238 (3.05 per match)

The 2012–13 Coppa Italia Lega Pro was the 41st edition of the competition that involving teams from Lega Pro in Italian football.

== Format and Seeding ==
Teams entered the competition at various stages, as follows:

- Group phase: the 42 clubs that not take place to 2012–13 Coppa Italia will be divided into 14 groups of 3 teams. Each team plays every other team of his group once, and the winner of each groups and best 7 runner-up will qualify for the next phase.
- Final phase:
  - First round: the 21 teams that qualify from the previous phase and the 27 teams that take place to Coppa Italia will dispute one-legged fixtures.
  - Second round: the 24 winner from the previous round will play another one-legged fixtures.
  - Third round: the 12 survivors will be divided in 4 groups of 3 teams. Each team plays every other team of his group once, and the winner of each groups will qualify for the next phase.
- Semifinals and Final: the 4 survivor teams will be played the two legged semifinals and final.

== Group phase ==
=== Group A ===
Team	Pld	W	D	L	GF	GA	GD	Pts	CSL	PPA	VDA
Casale	2	2	0	0	3	0	+3	6			2–0
Pro Patria	2	0	1	1	1	2	−1	1	0–1		
Vallée d’Aoste	2	0	1	1	1	3	−2	1		1–1	

=== Group B ===
Team	Pld	W	D	L	GF	GA	GD	Pts	SVN	ALE	PAV
Savona	2	2	0	0	5	1	+4	6		1–0	
Alessandria	2	0	1	1	1	2	−1	1			1–1
Pavia	2	0	1	1	2	5	−3	1	1–4		

=== Group C ===
Team	Pld	W	D	L	GF	GA	GD	Pts	COM	REN	MON
Como	2	2	0	0	7	3	+4	6		3–1	
Renate	2	1	0	1	3	3	0	3			2–0
Monza	2	0	0	2	2	6	−4	0	2–4		

=== Group D ===
Team	Pld	W	D	L	GF	GA	GD	Pts	TRI	MAN	CST
Tritium	2	1	0	1	3	2	+1	3		1–0	
Mantova	2	1	0	1	1	1	0	3			0–1
Castiglione	2	1	0	1	2	3	−1	3	1–3		

=== Group E ===
Team	Pld	W	D	L	GF	GA	GD	Pts	FER	BAS	VEN
FeralpiSalò	2	1	1	0	2	1	+1	4			0–0
Bassano	2	1	0	1	3	3	0	3	1–2		
Venezia	2	0	1	1	1	2	−1	1		1–2	

=== Group F ===
Team	Pld	W	D	L	GF	GA	GD	Pts	FOR	GIA	BEL
Forlì	2	2	0	0	6	0	+6	6			5–0
Giacomense	2	1	0	1	5	1	+4	3	0–1		
Bellaria Igea	2	0	0	2	0	10	−10	0		0–5	

=== Group G ===
Team	Pld	W	D	L	GF	GA	GD	Pts	RIM	SNT	FAN
Rimini	2	1	1	0	4	2	+2	4			2–0
Santarcangelo	2	1	1	0	3	2	+1	4	2–2		
Fano	2	0	0	2	0	3	−3	0		0–1	

=== Group H ===
Team	Pld	W	D	L	GF	GA	GD	Pts	VIA	GAV	PDE
Viareggio	2	1	1	0	5	2	+3	4		3–0	
Gavorrano	2	1	0	1	3	5	−2	3			3–2
Pontedera	2	0	1	1	4	5	−1	1	2–2		

=== Group I ===
Team	Pld	W	D	L	GF	GA	GD	Pts	POG	BOR	PRA
Poggibonsi	2	2	0	0	3	1	+2	6			1–0
Borgo a Buggiano	2	1	0	1	2	2	0	3	1–2		
Prato	2	0	0	2	0	2	−2	0		0–1	

=== Group L ===
Team	Pld	W	D	L	GF	GA	GD	Pts	LAQ	TER	FOL
L'Aquila	2	2	0	0	7	2	+5	6		3–1	
Teramo	2	0	1	1	3	5	−2	1			2–2
Foligno	2	0	1	1	3	6	−3	1	1–4		

=== Group M ===
Team	Pld	W	D	L	GF	GA	GD	Pts	APR	LAT	FON
Aprilia	2	1	0	1	3	2	+1	3			1–2
Latina	2	1	0	1	2	2	0	3	0–2		
Fondi	2	1	0	1	2	3	−1	3		0–2	

=== Group N ===
Team	Pld	W	D	L	GF	GA	GD	Pts	CAM	ARZ	AVN
Campobasso	2	1	1	0	4	2	+2	4		1–1	
Arzanese	2	1	1	0	3	1	+2	4			2–0
Aversa Normanna	2	0	0	2	1	5	−4	0	1–3		

=== Group O ===
Team	Pld	W	D	L	GF	GA	GD	Pts	MAF	SAL	MEL
Martina Franca	2	2	0	0	3	1	+2	6		2–1	
Salernitana	2	1	0	1	2	2	0	3			1–0
Melfi	2	0	0	2	0	2	−2	0	0–1		

=== Group P ===
Team	Pld	W	D	L	GF	GA	GD	Pts	HIN	VLA	MLZ
HinterReggio	2	2	0	0	3	0	+3	6		1–0	
Vigor Lamezia	2	1	0	1	3	1	+2	3			3–0
Milazzo	2	0	0	2	0	5	−5	0	0–2		

=== Best runner-up ===
Grp	Team	Pld	W	D	L	GF	GA	GD	Pts
N	Arzanese	2	1	1	0	3	1	+2	4
G	Santarcangelo	2	1	1	0	3	2	+1	4
F	Giacomense	2	1	0	1	5	1	+4	3
P	Vigor Lamezia	2	1	0	1	3	1	+2	3
E	Bassano	2	1	0	1	3	3	0	3
C	Renate	2	1	0	1	3	3	0	3
M	Latina	2	1	0	1	2	2	0	3 (Note: Latina qualified for the next round for the 3rd Tiebreaker criteria (away goal scored): Latina 2, Borgo a Buggiano 1, Salernitana 1.)
I	Borgo a Buggiano	2	1	0	1	2	2	0	3
O	Salernitana	2	1	0	1	2	2	0	3
D	Mantova	2	1	0	1	1	1	0	3
H	Gavorrano	2	1	0	1	3	5	−2	3
A	Pro Patria	2	0	1	1	1	2	−1	1
B	Alessandria	2	0	1	1	1	2	−1	1
L	Teramo	2	0	1	1	3	5	−2	1

== Final phase ==
=== First round ===
The draw for the first round was made on 22 September and the matches was played on 3 October 2012

Team 1	Score	Team 2
Como	1−0	Casale
Cuneo	2−3 (a.e.t.)	Tritium
Virtus Entella	0−1	Savona
Cremonese	4−1	Renate
FeralpiSalò	1−2	Südtirol
Lumezzane	2−1	AlbinoLeffe
Treviso	0−2	Bassano
Portogruaro	3−1	Giacomense
Santarcangelo	0−3	Viareggio
Carrarese	2−4	Reggiana
Forlì	0−3	Carpi
Pisa	3−0	Rimini
Poggibonsi	6−3 (a.e.t.)	San Marino
Perugia	2−1 (a.e.t.)	L'Aquila
Chieti	1−4	Gubbio
Aprilia	2−1	Frosinone
Avellino	2−1 (a.e.t.)	Arzanese
Benevento	2−1 (a.e.t.)	Barletta
Latina	1−1 (a.e.t.); 4−2 (pen.)	Paganese
Campobasso	1−0 (a.e.t.)	Sorrento
Andria BAT	1−2 (a.e.t.)	Nocerina
Lecce	2−1	Martina Franca
Trapani	2−0 (a.e.t.)	HinterReggio
Catanzaro	2−1	Vigor Lamezia

=== Second round ===
The draw for the second round was made on 5 October and the matches was played on 17 October 2012

Team 1	Score	Team 2
Como	2−2 (a.e.t.); 4−6 (pen.)	Tritium
Savona	2−2 (a.e.t.); 4−6 (pen.)	Cremonese
Südtirol	0−2	Lumezzane
Bassano	1−0	Portogruaro
Reggiana	0−1	Viareggio
Pisa	2−1	Carpi
Poggibonsi	3−4	Perugia
Gubbio	0−2	Aprilia
Avellino	0−1	Benevento
Latina	2−0	Campobasso
Nocerina	0−1	Lecce
Trapani	2−0	Catanzaro

=== Third round ===
The draw for the third round was made on 19 October and the matches will be played between 07-21 November and 5 December 2012

==== Group A ====
Team	Pld	W	D	L	GF	GA	GD	Pts	VIA	CRE	TRI
Viareggio	2	1	1	0	4	3	+1	4			1–1
Cremonese	2	1	0	1	4	3	+1	3	2–3		
Tritium	2	0	1	1	1	3	−2	1		0–2	

==== Group B ====
Team	Pld	W	D	L	GF	GA	GD	Pts	PIS	LUM	BAS
Pisa	2	2	0	0	6	0	+6	6		4–0	
Lumezzane	2	1	0	1	3	6	−3	3			3–2
Bassano	2	0	0	2	2	5	−3	0	0–2		

==== Group C ====
Team	Pld	W	D	L	GF	GA	GD	Pts	LCE	PER	APR
Lecce	2	1	0	1	6	3	+3	3			5–1
Perugia	2	1	0	1	3	3	0	3	2–1		
Aprilia	2	1	0	1	3	6	−3	3		2–1	

==== Group D ====
Team	Pld	W	D	L	GF	GA	GD	Pts	LAT	TRA	BEN
Latina	2	1	0	1	3	2	+1	3			2–0
Trapani	2	1	0	1	2	2	0	3	2–1		
Benevento	2	1	0	1	1	2	−1	3		1–0	

=== Semifinals ===
The first legs were played on 27 January and 24 February, and the second legs will be played on 27 February and 13 March 2013.

Team 1	Agg.	Team 2	1st leg	2nd leg
Viareggio	4–3	Pisa	1–3	3–0
Lecce	2–3	Latina	0–2	2–1

== Final ==
Team 1	Agg.	Team 2	1st leg	2nd leg
Viareggio	2–3	Latina	1–2	1–1
