= Nicola Ravaglia =

Italian footballer (born 1988)

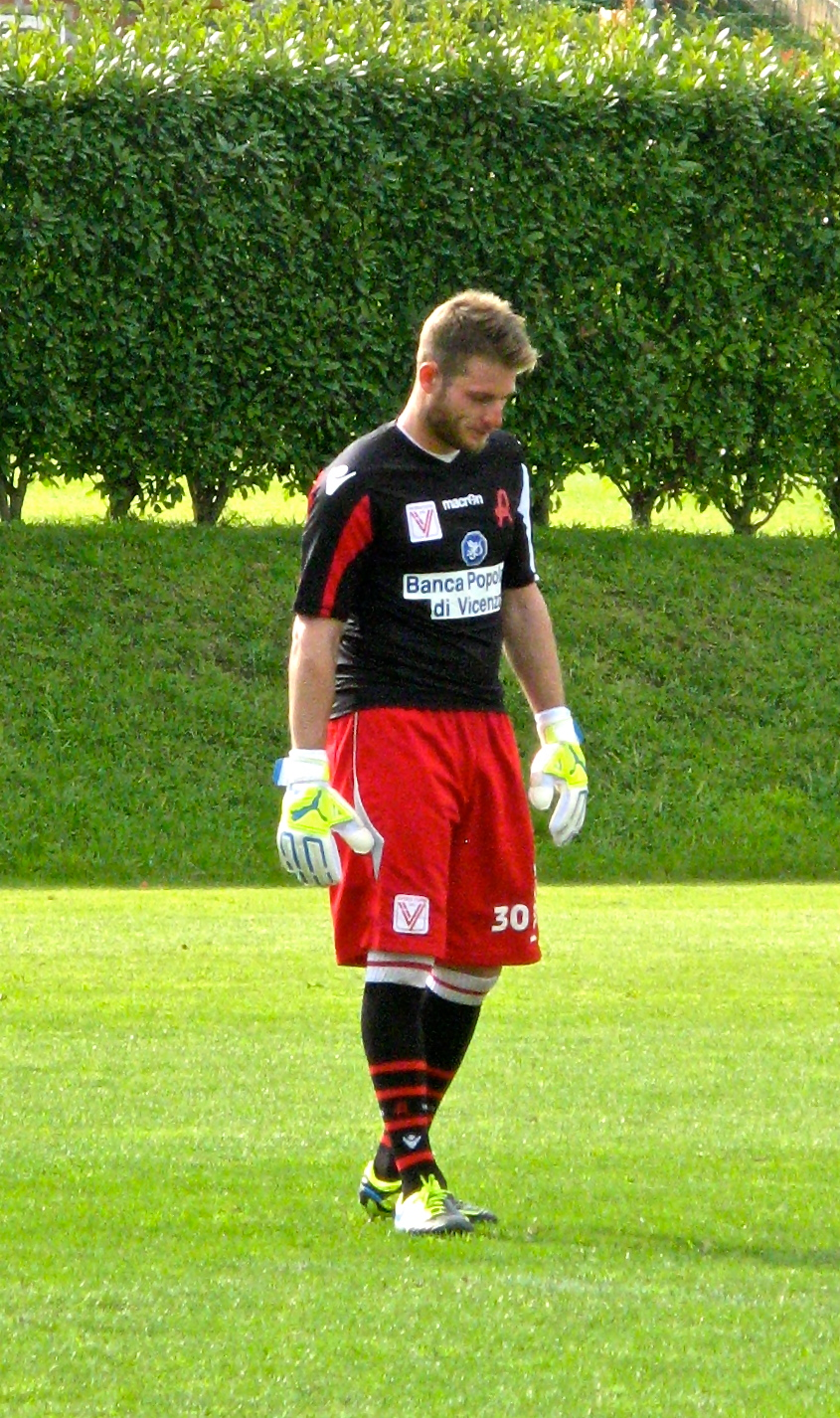
- Ravaglia with Vicenza in 2013

Personal information
- Date of birth: 12 December 1988 (age 37)
- Place of birth: Forlì, Italy
- Height: 1.84 m (6 ft 0 in)
- Position: Goalkeeper

Team information
- Current team: Carrarese
- Number: 30

Youth career
- –2007: Cesena

Senior career*
Years	Team	Apps	(Gls)
2007–2014	Cesena	51	(0)
2007–2008	→ Poggibonsi (loan)	33	(0)
2009–2010	→ Viareggio (loan)	33	(0)
2010–2011	→ SPAL (loan)	33	(0)
2013–2014	→ Vicenza (loan)	23	(0)
2014–2015	Parma	0	(0)
2014–2015	→ Cosenza (loan)	33	(0)
2015–2020	Cremonese	116	(0)
2020–2026	Sampdoria	11	(0)
2025	→ Carrarese (loan)	2	(0)
2026–	Carrarese	0	(0)
- * Club domestic league appearances and goals as of 19 September 2026

Nicola Ravaglia (born 12 December 1988) is an Italian professional footballer who plays as a goalkeeper for Serie B club Carrarese.

== Career ==
=== Cesena ===
Ravaglia made his Cesena and Serie B debut on 2006–07 Serie B season, and was loaned for U.S. Poggibonsi in the following season. After this loan, he was a first choice in 2008–09 Lega Pro Prima Divisione, which the club promoted back to Serie B. However, he was loaned again in the following season to F.C. Esperia Viareggio (also in co-ownership), and in the next, to SPAL 1907.

Ravaglia made his debut in Serie A on 10 September 2011, against Napoli. After the club relegated in 2012, he was the first choice in the first three rounds of 2012–13 Serie B, as well as five games before the winter break; since the arrival of Andrea Campagnolo, Ravaglia was the understudy. Ravaglia wore no.1 shirt for Cesena in 2012–13 season, but given to another youth product Andrea Rossini in 2013–14 season. (His new number 34 was taken by Cascione in mid-season)

==== Vicenza (loan) ====
On 23 August 2013, Ravaglia was signed by the third division club Vicenza Calcio, with Achille Coser moved to opposite direction. Vicenza had loaned out their goalkeepers Marcone and Pinsoglio to Serie B clubs. Ravaglia was the first choice for the Veneto club, despite in the promotion playoffs Enrico Alfonso was the first choice.

=== Parma ===
On 30 June 2014, Ravaglia (for €2.5 million), Lolli (for €1.5M) and Turchetta (for €1M) were signed by Parma for a total of €5 million, with Cascione (for €2.5M), Traoré (for €1.5M) and Crialese (for €1M) moved to opposite direction also for €5 million. On 8 July 2014, Ravaglia returned to the third division again, for Cosenza. On 25 June 2015, Ravaglia and fellow Cesena and Parma teammate Rossini became free agents after the bankruptcy of Parma.

=== Cremonese ===
On 7 July 2015, Ravaglia was signed by U.S. Cremonese.

=== Sampdoria ===
On 1 September 2020, Ravaglia signed a two-year contract with Sampdoria.

== Honours ==
Cesena

- Lega Pro Prima Divisione: 2008–09

Cosenza

- Coppa Italia Lega Pro: 2014–15

Cremonese

- Lega Pro: 2016–17
