= Stefano Dall'Acqua =

Italian footballer

Personal information
- Full name: Stefano Dall'Acqua
- Date of birth: July 13, 1981 (age 45)
- Place of birth: Oderzo, Italy
- Height: 1.91 m (6 ft 3 in)
- Position: Striker

Senior career*
Years	Team	Apps	(Gls)
1999–2000	Derthona	32	(10)
2000–2004	Reggina	16	(2)
2000–2001	→ Lecco (loan)	1	(0)
2001	→ Gela (loan)	8	(0)
2001–2002	→ Pro Patria (loan)	27	(11)
2002–2003	→ Cittadella (loan)	27	(14)
2004–2009	Treviso	30	(6)
2006	→ Catania (loan)	6	(0)
2006–2007	→ Foggia (loan)	17	(2)
2007	→ Novara (loan)	10	(3)
2007–2008	→ Grosseto (loan)	11	(3)
2008–2009	→ Reggiana (loan)	21	(3)
2009–2010	Juve Stabia	11	(0)
2010	Valle del Giovenco	8	(3)
2010–2011	Opitergina	26	(11)
2011–2012	Sacilese	46	(24)
2012–2013	Lentigione	9	(7)
2013–2014	Formigine	19	(3)
2014	Atletico San Paolo	1	(0)
2014–2015	Portomansuè	26	(13)
2015–2017	Conegliano		
2018–2019	United Albinea		

International career
2003	Italy U21	2	(0)
- * Club domestic league appearances and goals

Stefano Dall'Acqua (born July 13, 1981) is a retired Italian former footballer.

== Career ==
Dall'Acqua made his debut for Derthona in Serie D. He was then transferred to Reggina, and was loaned to Lecco and Gela in January. In summer 2001, he was loaned to Pro Patria, also in Serie C2. In summer 2002, he moved to Cittadella in Serie C1.

He made his Serie A debut on August 30, 2003, Reggina 2–2 draw with Sampdoria.

He then signed for Treviso of Serie B. But after the club was promoted to Serie A, he never had a chance to play and was loaned to Calcio Catania, where he won promotion to Serie A again.

In the 2006–07 season, he was loaned to Foggia and Novara of Serie C1.

In the 2007–08 season, he played for Serie B newcomer Grosseto.

In July 2008, he played for Reggiana on loan.

In the 2009–10 season, he joined Serie C2 team Juve Stabia. On February 1, 2010 he left for Valle del Giovenco, who also signed forward Giuseppe Caccavallo and Maikol Negro a few weeks earlier. He started in the 2 relegation playoffs, partnered with Negro.

From 2010 to 2014, he played for Opitergina, Sacilese, Lentigione and Formigine.

In summer 2014, he moved to Atletico San Paolo Padova in Serie D. In September 2014, he transferred to Portomansuè in Promozione.
