= Cristiano Spirito =

Italian footballer (born 1992)

Personal information
- Date of birth: 12 January 1992 (age 34)
- Place of birth: Rome, Italy
- Position: Defender

Team information
- Current team: Lamezia (on loan from Parma)

Youth career
- Lazio

Senior career*
| Years | Team | Apps | (Gls) |
| 2011–2013 | Melfi | 73 | (1) |
| 2013– | Parma | 0 | (0) |
| 2013–2014 | → Savona (loan) | 7 | (0) |
| 2014 | → San Marino (loan) | 12 | (0) |
| 2014– | → Lamezia (loan) | 0 | (0) |
- * Club domestic league appearances and goals as of end of 13–14 season

Cristiano Spirito (born 12 January 1992) is an Italian footballer who plays for Vigor Lamezia, on loan from Parma.

== Biography ==
Born in Rome, Lazio, Spirito started his career at Lazio. In mid-2011 Spirito was signed by the fourth division club Melfi on free transfer, where he played two seasons. Spirito also received call-up from Italy Lega Pro under-20 representative team. He played once against Croatia U20.

On 11 July 2013 Spirito was signed by the third division club Savona via Parma. On 14 January 2014 he was signed by San Marino Calcio.

On 8 July 2014 he was signed by Vigor Lamezia in temporary deal.
