= Leandro Campagna =

Italian footballer

Personal information
- Date of birth: 24 May 1994 (age 32)
- Place of birth: Latina, Italy
- Height: 1.85 m (6 ft 1 in)
- Position: Forward

Team information
- Current team: Cisterna Calcio

Youth career
- –2013: Frosinone

Senior career*
Years	Team	Apps	(Gls)
2011–2014	Frosinone	3	(0)
2013	→ Parma B (loan)	0	(0)
2014–2015	Parma	0	(0)
2014	→ Barletta (loan)	8	(0)
2014–2015	→ Melfi (loan)	5	(0)
2015–2016	Latina	3	(0)
2016–2017	Catanzaro	13	(1)
2018	Arezzo	5	(0)
2018–2019	Scandicci	17	(4)
2019–2020	Aprilia	8	(0)
2020–2021	Bra	36	(8)
2021	Rieti	2	(2)
2021–2023	ASD Cos Latina		
2023–2025	ASD Atletico Latina		
2025–2026	ASD Pontinia Calcio 1994		
2026–	Cisterna Calcio		

International career
2013	Italy U19	1	(0)
- * Club domestic league appearances and goals as of 13:21, 14 October 2026 (UTC)

Leandro Campagna (born 24 May 1994) is an Italian footballer who plays as a forward for Cisterna Calcio.

== Biography ==
Born in Latina, Lazio region, Campagna started his career at Lazio club Frosinone. He was the member of under-16–17 mixed team in 2009–10 and 2010–11 season. He also played 9 times for the under-20 reserve in 2010–11. Campagna made his senior debut on the last round of 2010–11 Serie B, which the first team certainly relegated. With the return of Mirko Gori from Parma, they were the protagonist for the under-19 reserve to win the league dedicated to Lega Pro clubs. Campagna scored a goal as a substitute in the final. For the first team, Campagna played twice in 2011–12 Lega Pro Prima Divisione. In January 2013, Campagna was signed by Parma in temporary deal with option to sign half of the registration rights, re-joining former Frosinone team-mate Daniele Abbracciante. Frosinone also signed forward Gianluca Lapadula from Cesena and Parma that month as reinforcement. On 20 June 2013 Parma excised the option for €600,000 transfer fee in 5-year contract. On 30 June 2013 Parma sold half of the "card" of forward Daniel Ciofani to Frosinone for €600,000 as compensation . Campagna returned to Frosinone in temporary deal but failed to play any game. After Ciofani was signed outright, Campagna returned to Parma on 27 January 2014 but immediately departed for Barletta.

In summer 2014 he was signed by Melfi in temporary deal. On 2 February 2015 Campagna returned to Parma, with Alessandro Luparini moved from Parma to Melfi. He remained unattached on July 1, 2015, as Parma was dissolved due to financial troubles. He was signed by Latina on November 6, 2015, signing a contract that will keep him in the club until June 2016.

On 3 January 2020, Campagna joined Serie D club A.C. Bra.
