= Andrea Scicchitano =

Italian footballer (born 1992)

Personal information
- Date of birth: 26 April 1992 (age 34)
- Place of birth: Rome, Italy
- Height: 1.72 m (5 ft 8 in)
- Position: Defender

Youth career
- Roma

Senior career*
Years	Team	Apps	(Gls)
2010–2011	Sangiovannese	15	(0)
2011–2012	San Marino	1	(0)
2012	Pisa	2	(0)
2012–2013	Siena	0	(0)
2012–2013	→ Poggibonsi (loan)	20	(0)
2013–2015	Parma	0	(0)
2013–2014	→ Ascoli (loan)	5	(0)
2014	→ Pontedera (loan)	2	(0)
2014–2015	→ Santarcangelo (loan)	6	(0)
2015	→ Tuttocuoio (loan)	1	(0)
2015–2016	Latina	0	(0)
2015–2016	→ Lupa Castelli Romani (loan)	13	(0)
2016–2017	Crotone	0	(0)
2016–2017	→ Lupa Roma (loan)	10	(0)
2017	Trastevere	11	(0)
- * Club domestic league appearances and goals as of 1 May 2018

Andrea Scicchitano (born 26 April 1992) is an Italian footballer who most recently played for Trastevere Calcio.

== Biography ==
Born in Rome, capital of Italy and Lazio region, Scicchitano started his career at A.S. Roma. In 2010, he left for Sangiovannese in co-ownership deal. In June 2011 Roma gave up the remain 50% registration rights to Sangiovannese. However, the club also bankrupted. In 2011–12 season he was a player of San Marino and Pisa in the first half and second half respectively.

In 2012, he was signed by Siena as free agent. He was farmed to Poggibonsi in a temporary deal. In 2013, he was signed by Parma in a 3-year contract, but farmed to Ascoli immediately.

On 31 January 2014 he was signed by Pontedera.

After the bankruptcy of Parma, he was signed by Lega Pro newcomer Lupa Castelli Romani in a temporary deal from Latina.

On 30 August 2016 Scicchitano was signed by Lupa Roma from Crotone. Crotone signed him as a free agent in the same window.
