= Alessandro Luparini =

Italian footballer (born 1993)

Personal information
- Date of birth: 10 March 1993 (age 33)
- Place of birth: Spoleto, Italy
- Position: Forward

Youth career
- Siena

Senior career*
Years	Team	Apps	(Gls)
2010–2012	Foligno	6	(0)
2012–2013	Spoleto	19	(3)
2013–2015	Parma	0	(0)
2013–2015	→ Gubbio (loan)	14	(3)
2015	→ Melfi (loan)	2	(0)
2015–2016	Foligno	3	(0)
2016	Città Castello	6	(0)
2016–2017	Rignanese Calcio	21	(1)
2017	Olympia Agnonese	7	(1)
- * Club domestic league appearances and goals

Alessandro Luparini (born 10 March 1993) is an Italian footballer who most recently played for Olympia Agnonese.

== Biography ==
Born in Spoleto, Umbria region, Luparini started his career at the Tuscan club Siena. He was a player for the Allievi under-16/17 team in the 2008–09 season. In summer 2010, he was signed by Foligno in a temporary deal. He played for the reserve team, and twice in 2010–11 Lega Pro Prima Divisione. In June 2011, Foligno signed Luparini outright.

In October 201,2 Luparini left for his hometown club Spoleto. He played 19 times in 2012–13 Serie D.

In July 201,3 Luparini was signed by Parma. He was loaned to Serie C1 club Gubbio along with other Parma teammates such as the forwards Caccavallo, Cocuzza, Russo and Sandomenico.

On 16 July 2014, the loan was renewed. Gubbio also signed Domini, Casiraghi, Bentoglio and Manganelli on the same day.

On 30 January 2015, Luparini left for A.S. Melfi, with Leandro Campagna returned to Parma.
