= Daniele Casiraghi =

Italian footballer (born 1993)

Personal information
- Date of birth: 10 March 1993 (age 33)
- Place of birth: Treviglio, Italy
- Height: 1.75 m (5 ft 9 in)
- Position: Midfielder

Team information
- Current team: Ravenna (on loan from Südtirol)
- Number: 8

Youth career
- Tritium

Senior career*
Years	Team	Apps	(Gls)
2011–2013	Tritium	58	(2)
2013–2014	Lecce	0	(0)
2013–2014	→ Pro Patria (loan)	23	(0)
2014–2015	Parma	0	(0)
2014–2015	→ Gubbio (loan)	35	(4)
2015–2016	Ancona	33	(4)
2016–2019	Gubbio	104	(18)
2019–	Südtirol	232	(58)
2026–	→ Ravenna (loan)	5	(0)

International career
2011–2012	Italy U19	2	(0)
2011–2012	Italy U20 "C"	2	(1)
2012–2013	Italy U20	3	(0)
- * Club domestic league appearances and goals as of 27 September 2026

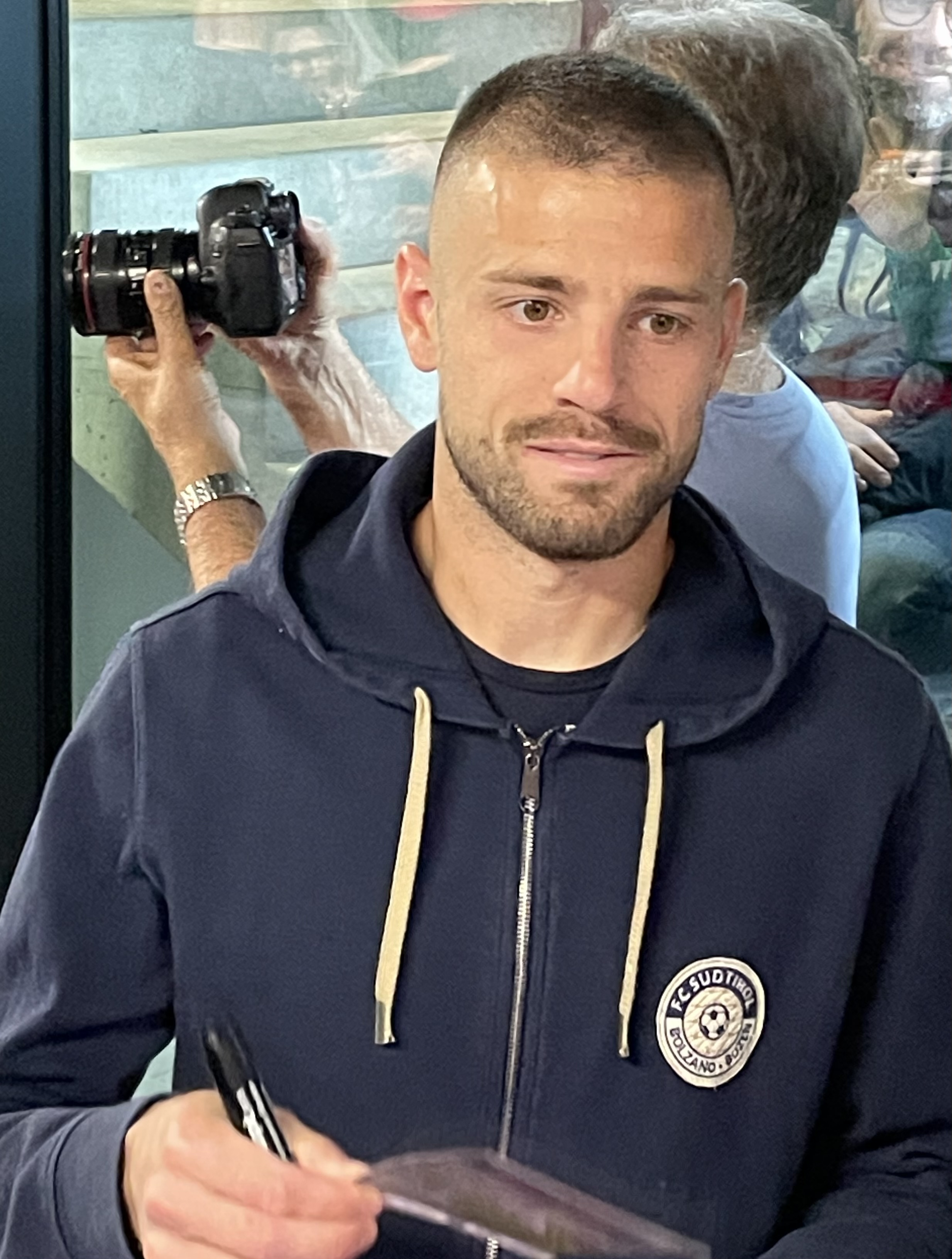
Casiraghi in 2024

Daniele Casiraghi (born 10 March 1993) is an Italian footballer who plays as a midfielder for Serie C Group B club Ravenna on loan from Südtirol.

== Club career ==
Born in Treviglio, Lombardy, Casiraghi started his career at a small Lombard team Tritium. He played for its reserve in 2010–11 season. In March 2011 Casiraghi also scored in his league debut for the first team, against Sacilese. Casiraghi was a regular member of the first team in 2011–12 and 2012–13 Lega Pro Prima Divisione seasons. On 1 August 2013 Casiraghi was signed by Lecce in a 3-year contract. On 17 August 2013 he appeared as an unused bench against Parma F.C. in 2013–14 Coppa Italia. He left on loan to Pro Patria in the same transfer window.

On 30 June 2014 Casiraghi was signed by Serie A club Parma F.C. in a 4-year contract, with Abdou Doumbia moved to opposite direction. Both players were valued for €1 million.

On 16 July 2014 Casiraghi left for Gubbio along with Tommaso Domini, Alessandro Luparini, Michele Bentoglio and Pietro Manganelli in temporary deals. On 25 June 2015 Casiraghi became a free agent, after the bankruptcy of Parma.

In July 2015 he was signed by Lega Pro club Ancona. On 12 September 2016 he was signed by Gubbio.

On 4 July 2019, he signed with Südtirol for two years with an option for a third.

On 5 February 2022 against Renate, at the "Città di Meda" Stadium, Daniele Casiraghi achieves 100 caps with Südtirol.

=== International career ===
Casiraghi received a call-up from Lega Pro representative team in November 2011 against Belgium U23 in 2011–13 International Challenge Trophy. Casiraghi then received his first call-up from Italy U19 team in December 2011 against the Lega Pro representatives, however he did not play. Casiraghi played twice in friendlies in February and March 2012 for U19 team. In April 2012 he represented Lega Pro to win a youth tournament in Dubai, winning Al-Shabab in the final. In June 2012 he played for Lega Pro winning San Marino 8–0.

In 2012–13 season he received call-up from Luigi Di Biagio for Italy national under-20 football team.
