= Pietro Manganelli =

Italian footballer

Personal information
- Date of birth: 3 December 1993 (age 32)
- Place of birth: Siena, Italy
- Height: 1.88 m (6 ft 2 in)
- Position: Centre-back

Team information
- Current team: Colligiana

Senior career*
Years	Team	Apps	(Gls)
2010–2011	Monteriggioni	13	(0)
2011–2013	Siena	0	(0)
2012–2013	→ Borgo (loan)	21	(0)
2013–2014	Colligiana	22	(2)
2014–2015	Parma	0	(0)
2014–2015	→ Gubbio (loan)	24	(0)
2015–2016	Taranto	6	(2)
2016	Jolly Montemurlo	11	(0)
2016–2017	Teramo	3	(0)
2017	Pro Piacenza	3	(0)
2017–2018	San Donato	23	(0)
2018–2020	Scandicci	60	(7)
2020–2022	Lornano Badesse	58	(2)
2022–	Colligiana		
- * Club domestic league appearances and goals

Pietro Manganelli (born 3 December 1993) is an Italian footballer who plays as a centre-back for Serie D club A.S.D. San Donato Tavarnelle.

== Club career ==
Manganelli started his senior career at Italian fifth division (Serie D) club Monteriggioni, in the Province of Siena. In 2011, he joined hometown club Siena's reserve team. Manganelli left Siena in 2012 for Italian fourth division (ex–Serie C2) club Borgo-a-Buggiano, along with Andrea Pastore in temporary deals. In 2013, he signed for non-league side Colligiana.

In 2014, the player was signed by Serie A club Parma. Manganelli, along with Michele Bentoglio, Daniele Casiraghi, Tommaso Domini and Alessandro Luparini were loaned to Lega Pro (ex–Serie C) club Gubbio in temporary deals.
