= Ngambé =

Coordinates: 4.2333°N 10.6167°E

Ngambè, Sanaga Maritime, Cameroun
- Commune and town
- Interactive map of Ngambè, Sanaga Maritime, Cameroun
- Country: Cameroon
- Time zone: UTC+1 (WAT)

Ngambé is a town and commune in Cameroon.

== See also ==
- Communes of Cameroon
