= Yago Del Piero =

Brazilian footballer (born 1994)

Personal information
- Date of birth: 14 January 1994 (age 32)
- Place of birth: Brazil
- Position: Midfielder

Team information
- Current team: AC Noventa

Youth career
- Treviso
- 2008–2013: Inter Milan
- 2013: → Cesena (loan)

Senior career*
Years	Team	Apps	(Gls)
2013–2015	Cesena	0	(0)
2013–2014	→ San Marino (loan)	10	(0)
2015	San Marino		
2015–2017	Opitergina		
2017–2021	Conegliano		
2021–2022	ASD Prata Falchi Visinale		
2022–	AC Noventa		
- * Club domestic league appearances and goals as of 14 February 2026

Yago Del Piero (born 14 January 1994) is a Brazilian footballer who plays as a midfielder for AC Noventa.

== Career ==
Born in Brazil, Del Piero traveled to Italy at a young age. He was a member of Treviso youth team.

=== Inter Milan ===
On 1 September 2008, he was signed by Inter Milan for undisclosed fee, then champions of Serie A and the reserves. On the same day, Daniel Maa Boumsong joined Treviso outright for an additional €250,000 fee.

Del Piero was a member of Inter's under-18 team in 2011–12 Campionato Nazionale Dante Berretti season and under-19 team in 2012–13 Campionato Nazionale Primavera season. Del Piero also played few friendlies for Inter first team in 2012.

=== Cesena ===
On 30 January 2013, Del Piero left for Cesena on a temporary basis with an option to purchase half of the registration rights. In June 2013 Cesena exercised the option for €250,000 fee on a three-year contract. That month also saw Inter bought back Luca Caldirola, making the club purchased Del Piero by counter-weight part the payable received from Inter. In July Del Piero, along with Saša Čičarević and Marco Paolini left for San Marino Calcio in temporary deal from Cesena.

Del Piero made his debut in the second match of the league cup. Paolini also played the first match of the league. In June 2014 Cesena signed him outright for free, which the club also registered a special income of €250,000, due to the cancellation of the payable to Inter for the second half of the player's registration rights.

Circa summer 2015 Cesena released Del Piero for free (one year earlier than his original contract). The club also registered an accounting loss of €166,667, the residual accounting value of the player.
