= Marco Paolini (footballer) =

Italian footballer

Personal information
- Date of birth: 20 April 1995 (age 31)
- Place of birth: Cesena
- Position: Defender

Youth career
- –2013: Cesena

Senior career*
Years	Team	Apps	(Gls)
2013–2015	Parma	0	(0)
2013–2015	→ San Marino (loan)	13	(0)

International career
2013	Italy U18	2	(0)
- * Club domestic league appearances and goals

Marco Paolini (born 20 April 1995) is an Italian footballer who plays as a defender.

== Career ==
=== Cesena ===
Paolini was a youth product of Romagna club Cesena. He was the member of the under-17 youth team in 2011–12 season. In the next season Paolini made 23 out of possible 26 games for Cesena's reserve.

Paolini received a call-up to the under-18 national team in January 2013, for the Valentin Granatkin Memorial.

=== Parma ===
On 29 June 2013 half of the registration rights of Paolini were exchanged with hard of the "card" of Davide Adorni of Parma F.C.

On 22 July 2013 Paolini left for San Marino Calcio of the Republic of San Marino, an enclave of Italy (border Romagna and Marche), but was participating in Italian third division. The club also signed Yago Del Piero and Saša Čičarević from Cesena in the same formula in temporary deals.

Paolini made his debut in the second match of the league cup. Paolini also played the first match of the league.

In June 2014 Parma acquired Paolini outright, as well as Cesena acquired Adorni outright.

On 9 July 2014 his loan to San Marino was extended.
