= Denílson Gabionetta =

Brazilian footballer (born 1985)

Denilson Gabionetta
Personal information
- Full name: Denilson Martinho Gabionetta
- Date of birth: 5 October 1985 (age 41)
- Place of birth: Campinas, Brazil
- Height: 1.78 m (5 ft 10 in)
- Positions: Winger; striker

Team information
- Current team: Santa Maria

Senior career*
Years	Team	Apps	(Gls)
2006–2011	SEV Hortolândia	0	(0)
2007–2008	→ Varese (loan)	12	(1)
2008	→ Pisa (loan)	16	(0)
2008–2009	→ AlbinoLeffe (loan)	27	(2)
2009–2010	→ Crotone (loan)	31	(9)
2011	→ Torino (loan)	9	(0)
2011–2013	Crotone	63	(18)
2013–2015	Parma	0	(0)
2013–2014	→ CFR Cluj (loan)	15	(1)
2014–2015	→ Salernitana (loan)	30	(8)
2015–2016	Salernitana	24	(5)
2016–2017	Hangzhou Greentown	53	(10)
2018	AEL Limassol	12	(3)
2018	Meizhou Meixian Techand	9	(1)
2019	Grêmio Osasco		
2019	Caldense	6	(1)
2019–2020	Padova	5	(0)
2020–2021	Olhanense	12	(1)
2021	FC Messina	3	(2)
2021–	Santa Maria	0	(0)
- * Club domestic league appearances and goals as of 5 December 2021

Denilson Martinho Gabionetta, sometimes known as just Denilson (born 5 October 1985) is a Brazilian footballer who plays as a left winger for Serie D club Santa Maria.

== Club ==
Denilson Gabionetta started his career at Hortolândia for Social Esportiva Vitória (SEV in short). He scored 5 goals in São Paulo State Football League Série A3 (the third division of the state pyramid). He was loaned to various Italian club namely Varese, Pisa, AlbinoLeffe, and Crotone.

=== Crotone ===
Denilson Gabionetta arrived Crotone in summer 2009. He scored his first goal for the Crotone on 26 September 2009, in 1 to 1 in Bergamo against Albinoleffe, his former team. He briefly returned to Brazil in the first half of 2010–11 season. In January 2011 he was loaned to Torino F.C. Italian Football Federation authorized the transfer on 23 February 2011.

In July 2011 Crotone signed Denilson Gabionetta from SEV again in a temporary deal with an option to buy. In summer 2012 Crotone excised the option in a 2-year contract.

=== Parma ===
In 2013 Denilson Gabionetta was signed by Parma F.C. for €200,000 in a co-ownership deal. In June 2014 the co-ownership deal was renewed. However, in summer 2014 Parma bought him outright for another €200,000.

=== Salernitana ===
Salernitana signed Denilson Gabionetta on loan with an option to buy outright on 18 July 2014, from Parma.

Parma went bankrupted in June 2015, making Denílson a free agent. He also signed a new contract with Salernitana.

=== Hangzhou Greentown ===
On 26 February 2016 Denilson Gabionetta was sold to Chinese football club Hangzhou Greentown.

=== Later years ===
On 16 October 2020, after a season at Serie C's Padova, Denílson joined Olhanense in Portugal.

In October 2021, he moved back to Italy to sign for Serie D club FC Messina. Less than two months later, he however left FC Messina to join fellow Serie D club Santa Maria.
