= Stefano Rossini (footballer, born 1991) =

Italian footballer

Personal information
- Date of birth: 3 January 1991 (age 35)
- Place of birth: Formia, Italy
- Position: Midfielder

Youth career
- Cisco Roma

Senior career*
Years	Team	Apps	(Gls)
2008–2009	Cisco Roma	1	(0)
2009–2010	Sanluri	32	(1)
2010–2013	Fondi	45	(1)
2011	→ Aprilia (loan)	14	(0)
2013–2015	Parma	0	(0)
2013–2015	→ Lamezia (loan)		
2015–2019	Nuova Itri	0	(0)
- * Club domestic league appearances and goals

Stefano Rossini (born 3 January 1991) is an Italian footballer.

== Biography ==
Born in Formia, Lazio region, Rossini started his career at the regional and national capital – Rome, for Cisco Roma. He spent 1 season in Serie D before joining Serie C2 team Fondi.

On 4 July 2013 he was signed by Serie A club Parma on free transfer. On 9 July 2013 he was farmed to Vigor Lamezia. On 8 July 2014 the loan was renewed.

In August 2015, Rossini joined Italian club ASD Nuova Itri Calcio. He announced in June 2019, that he would leave the club after four years.
