= Francesco Checcucci =

Italian footballer (born 1989)

Personal information
- Full name: Francesco Checcucci
- Date of birth: 18 March 1989 (age 37)
- Place of birth: Bagno a Ripoli, Italy
- Height: 1.91 m (6 ft 3 in)
- Position: Defender

Youth career
- –2007: Fiorentina
- 2007–2008: Prato

Senior career*
Years	Team	Apps	(Gls)
2008	Prato	1	(0)
2008–2009	Chievo	0	(0)
2009–2011	Lumezzane	43	(1)
2011–2013	Crotone	11	(0)
2013–2014	Parma	0	(0)
2013–2014	→ Gorica (loan)	0	(0)
2014–2015	Savoia	25	(3)
2015–2016	AlbinoLeffe	25	(4)
- * Club domestic league appearances and goals

Francesco Checcucci (born 18 March 1989) is a former Italian footballer who played as a defender.

== Career ==
Born in Bagno a Ripoli, the Province of Florence, Checcucci started his career at Fiorentina. In the 2007–08 season, he left for Prato, also located in Tuscany. In the next season, he went to the Primavera under-20 team of Serie A side Chievo.

=== Lumezzane ===
In June 2009, Checcucci graduated from the Primavera team, and left for Lega Pro Prima Divisione (Italian third highest level) side Lumezzane in a co-ownership deal.

On 24 June 2010, Checcucci, along with Fabio Pisacane, was bought back by Chievo. But on 15 July 2010 he was re-signed by Lumezzane in another co-ownership deal.

=== Crotone ===
In June 2011, Checcucci returned to Verona again. However, he left for Crotone in another co-ownership deal for €210,000. On 21 June 2013, Crotone acquired Checcucci outright for free.

=== Parma ===
Checcucci was sold to Parma in July 2013 for €200,000; however, on 1 August 2013, Checcucci was signed by Slovenian club Gorica in a temporary deal.

=== Savoia ===
In August 2014, Checcucci was signed by Savoia.

=== AlbinoLeffe ===
On 5 August 2015, he was signed by AlbinoLeffe.
