= Badara Sarr =

Senegalese footballer

Personal information
- Date of birth: 11 February 1994 (age 32)
- Place of birth: Thiès, Senegal
- Position: Midfielder

Youth career
- –2013: Parma

Senior career*
Years	Team	Apps	(Gls)
2013–2015	Parma	0	(0)
2013–2014	→ Gubbio (loan)	8	(0)
2015	→ Catanzaro (loan)	9	(0)
2015–2017	Maceratese	3	(0)
2016	→ Lumezzane (loan)	0	(0)
- * Club domestic league appearances and goals

Badara Sarr (born 11 February 1994 in Thiès, Senegal) is a Senegalese footballer.

He was a youth product of Italian football club Parma. In July 2013 Sarr was signed by Lega Pro Prima Divisione club Gubbio in a temporary deal. After spending 7 months with the first team of Parma, on 3 February 2015 Sarr left for Catanzaro.

On 21 July 2015 Sarr was signed by Maceratese.

On 28 January 2016 Sarr was signed by Lumezzane in a temporary deal, with Francesco Potenza moved to opposite direction outright.
