= Giuseppe Caccavallo =

Italian footballer (born 1987)

Personal information
- Date of birth: 11 April 1987 (age 39)
- Place of birth: Naples, Italy
- Height: 1.75 m (5 ft 9 in)
- Position: Forward

Team information
- Current team: Giugliano (chief scout)

Youth career
- –2006: Lecce

Senior career*
Years	Team	Apps	(Gls)
2006–2011	Lecce	11	(2)
2007–2008	→ Taranto (loan)	8	(0)
2008	→ Martina (loan)	8	(2)
2008–2009	→ Sorrento (loan)	2	(0)
2009	→ Celano (loan)	16	(6)
2009–2010	→ Cosenza (loan)	18	(1)
2010	→ Pescina VdG (loan)	7	(0)
2010–2011	→ Barletta (loan)	5	(1)
2011	→ Pergocrema (loan)	13	(1)
2011–2014	Crotone	8	(0)
2012–2014	→ Gubbio (loan)	44	(7)
2014–2015	Parma	0	(0)
2014–2015	→ Paganese (loan)	17	(4)
2015	→ Casertana (loan)	12	(2)
2015–2016	Paganese	26	(14)
2016–2017	Salernitana	10	(0)
2017–2019	Venezia	5	(0)
2017	→ Cosenza (loan)	12	(0)
2018	→ Catania (loan)	5	(0)
2018–2019	→ Carrarese (loan)	26	(16)
2019–2021	Carrarese	23	(2)
2021–2022	Siena	19	(3)
2022–2023	Gelbison	0	(0)
2023	Nocerina	7	(2)
2023–2024	Angri	9	(1)
2024–2025	Nola		
Total		311	(64)
- * Club domestic league appearances and goals

Giuseppe Caccavallo (born 11 April 1987) is an Italian former footballer who is currently as a chief scout for Italian Serie C club Giugliano.

== Career ==
=== Lecce ===
Born in Naples, Campania, Caccavallo started his career with Serie B club Lecce. He made his Serie B debut on 11 November 2006, replaced Juliano Vicentini in the 77th minute. He made his first start on round 17 (19 December 2006), partnered with Alessandro Tulli and Pablo Daniel Osvaldo. He also scored the opening goal for the team on that match. Eventually Lecce winning Spezia 2–0. He scored his second goal in the last round (round 42, 10 June 2007), which he partnered with Simone Tiribocchi and the team winning the bottom team Pescara 4–1.

=== Lega Pro clubs ===
In 2007, he left for Serie C1 side Taranto. In January 2008, he left for fellow Serie C1/B side Martina. He scored 2 league goals for the team. Martina finished as the bottom team and relegated.

In 2008, he left for Lega Pro Prima Divisione side Sorrento. In January 2009, he left for Seconda Divisione club Celano along with Lecce teammate Stefano Mandorino.

In July 2009, he left for Prima Divisione side Cosenza in a co-ownership deal along with Lecce teammate Ugo Gabrieli who went on loan. In January 2010, Lecce bought him back and re-sold him to Valle del Giovenco in a new co-ownership deal. VdG also signed Stefano Dall'Acqua and former Celano teammate Maikol Negro that transfer window, made Caccavallo a backup player, only played 3 starts out of 7 appearances. Circa summer 2010 Lecce bought back Caccavallo .

In August 2010, he was loaned to Prima Divisione club Barletta in temporary deal. Caccavallo made his league debut for Barletta on round 1 (22 August 2010), replaced striker Daniele Simoncelli at the start of second half (433 formation). He scored his first goal in round 4 (12 September), also his second appearance. He replaced Nicola Bellomo in the second half. In the next round (19 September), he made his first start for Barletta, partnered with new signing Massimo Margiotta and Bellomo in 4321 formation. Coach Arcangelo Sciannimanico putted the original starter Paolo Carbonaro and Saveriano Infantino on the bench.

=== Crotone ===
In July 2011, he joined the Serie B side Crotone. In his maiden Serie season, Caccavallo played 8 times. On 31 August 2012 Caccavallo left for Gubbio of the third division.

=== Parma ===
In July 2013 Parma acquired half of the registration rights of Caccavallo. Crotone acquired Abdelaye Diakité in exchange (later replaced by Prestia). Caccavallo remained in Gubbio in another temporary deal. In June 2014 Parma acquired Caccavallo outright, as well as bought back Prestia.

On 22 July 2014, he was signed by Paganese in temporary deal, along with Bussi, Deli and Tartaglia. On 23 January 2015 Caccavallo left for Casertana.

=== Return to Paganese ===
After released by Parma, Caccavallo re-joined Paganese.

=== Salernitana ===
On 5 July 2016, he was signed by Salernitana in a three-year contract

=== Venezia ===
In January 2017 he moved to Venezia team that plays in the Lega Pro, coached by Filippo Inzaghi, which aims to jump in class.

=== Carrarese ===
Following a very successful loan in the 2018–19 season at Carrarese, he moved there on a permanent basis on 13 August 2019.

=== Siena ===
On 25 August 2021 he signed a two-years contract for Siena.

=== Gelbison ===
On 21 August 2022, Caccavallo moved to Gelbison, newly promoted to Serie C.

== Executive & scouting career ==
On 1 July 2025, Caccavallo was appointed technical director at FC Pompei until 31 December 2025.

He left Pompei and was appointed technical director at Polisportiva Acerrana 1926 on 10 January 2026 until 3 April 2026.

After served as technical director for two club (Pompei and Acerrana), he changed careers as chief scout at Giugliano on 6 June 2026 until now.
