= Ivan Cacchioli =

Italian footballer

Personal information
- Date of birth: 17 July 1990 (age 36)
- Place of birth: Carrara, Italy
- Position: Goalkeeper

Senior career*
Years	Team	Apps	(Gls)
2008–2009	Sestri Levante	23	(0)
2009–2010	Sansepolcro	26	(0)
2010–2011	Fondi	23	(0)
2011–2015	Parma	0	(0)
2011–2012	→ Pavia (loan)	4	(0)
2012–2013	→ Fondi (loan)	6	(0)
2013–2014	→ Gubbio (loan)	2	(0)
2014	→ Gorica (loan)	1	(0)
2014–2015	→ L'Aquila (loan)	2	(0)
2015	Pontedera	0	(0)
- * Club domestic league appearances and goals

Ivan Cacchioli (born 17 July 1990) is an Italian footballer who plays as a goalkeeper.

== Career ==
Circa 2011 Ivan Cacchioli was signed by Parma in a 5-year contract. he joined third-tier side Pavia on loan immediately in a year-long deal.

In 2014, he was signed by L'Aquila Calcio 1927.

In 2015, he was signed by Lega Pro club Pontedera as a free agent. He was released again in mid-season.
