= Francesco Deli =

Italian football player

Personal information
- Date of birth: 17 July 1994 (age 32)
- Place of birth: Rome, Italy
- Height: 1.81 m (5 ft 11 in)
- Position: Forward

Team information
- Current team: Tivoli

Youth career
- –2011: Atletico Roma

Senior career*
Years	Team	Apps	(Gls)
2011–2013	Palestrina	39	(6)
2013–2014	Paganese	25	(4)
2014–2015	Parma	0	(0)
2014–2015	→ Paganese (loan)	25	(4)
2015–2017	Paganese	48	(5)
2017	→ Foggia (loan)	15	(6)
2017–2019	Foggia	58	(9)
2019–2022	Cremonese	40	(3)
2022	→ Pordenone (loan)	12	(1)
2022–2023	Pordenone	26	(3)
2023–2024	Catania	10	(1)
2024–2025	Casertana	32	(3)
2025–2026	Nocerina	5	(0)
2026–	Tivoli		
- * Club domestic league appearances and goals as of 4 January 2026

Francesco Deli (born 17 July 1994) is an Italian professional football player who plays for Eccellenza club Tivoli.

== Club career ==
Deli made his Serie C debut for Paganese on 8 September 2013 in a game against Pontedera.

On 17 July 2019, he signed a three-year contract with Cremonese. On 28 January 2022, he joined Pordenone on loan until 30 June 2022.

On 13 July 2022, Deli returned to Pordenone on a permanent basis and signed a two-year contract.

On 11 January 2024, Deli moved to Casertana.
