= Emmanuel Cascione =

Italian footballer (born 1983)

Personal information
- Date of birth: 22 September 1983 (age 43)
- Place of birth: Catanzaro, Italy
- Height: 1.87 m (6 ft 2 in)
- Position: Midfielder

Team information
- Current team: San Marino (head coach)

Youth career
- 1994–1996: Fiorentina
- 1996–1997: Lido di Camaiore
- 1998–2000: Lucchese
- 2000–2001: West Ham United

Senior career*
Years	Team	Apps	(Gls)
2001–2002	West Ham United	0	(0)
2002–2005	Pistoiese	76	(5)
2005–2007	Rimini	56	(4)
2007–2010	Reggina	60	(2)
2010–2013	Pescara	99	(11)
2013–2014	Parma	0	(0)
2013–2014	→ Cesena (loan)	30	(7)
2014–2018	Cesena	87	(2)
2018	Santarcangelo	14	(3)
2018–2019	Forlì	20	(2)

International career
2002	Italy U20	3	(0)

Managerial career
- 2019–2020: Cattolica SM
- 2020–2021: Napoli U19
- 2021–2022: Sassuolo U18
- 2022: Pistoiese
- 2024: Pescara
- 2024–: San Marino
- * Club domestic league appearances and goals

Emmanuel Cascione (born 22 September 1983) is an Italian football coach and a former player who played as a midfielder. He is the head coach of Serie D club San Marino.

== Playing career ==
Cascione was signed by West Ham United in July 2000 and released in January 2002. He then joined Pistoiese, at that time at Serie B. He followed the club relegated to Serie C1 and returned to Serie B by joining Rimini in the summer of 2005.

=== Cesena ===
In the summer of 2013, he joined Parma on a free transfer. In August 2013 Cascione was signed by Serie B club Cesena in temporary deal, Cesena also received €500,000 from Parma as premi di valorizzazione.

On 30 June 2014, Cascione was signed by Cesena outright in a three-year contract, in a direct cashless swap with goalkeeper Nicola Ravaglia.

== Coaching career ==
On 17 July 2019, he joined Serie D club Cattolica Calcio San Marino as a head coach.

In July 2022, Cascione was hired by Serie D club Pistoiese. He was sacked on 25 October 2022 due to negative results.

On 18 March 2024, Cascione was hired as the new head coach of Serie C club Pescara, a former team of his as a player.
