= Vigor Lamezia =

Italian football club

- Full name: ASD Vigor Lamezia Calcio 1919
- Nicknames: Vigorini, Biancoverdi
- Founded: 1919; 1977; 1995; 2020; 2021
- Ground: Stadio Guido D'Ippolito, Lamezia Terme, Italy
- Capacity: 3,730
- League: Serie D
- 2025–26: Serie D/I, 10th
- Website: http://vigorlamezia.it
Home colours	Away colours

Vigor Lamezia is an Italian association football club, based in Lamezia Terme, Calabria. Vigor Lamezia currently plays in Serie D, the fourth level of the Italian football league system.

== History ==
The club was founded in 1919 and refounded in 1995 and 2017.

Vigor Lamezia reached the highest point of its history with the 9th place in the Serie C 1947–48.

In the 2013–14 season, it was promoted to Lega Pro for the second time in the club's history. After ending 2014/15 Lega Pro in 11th place, Vigor Lamezia was placed last and relegated as punishment for match-fixing.

After going bankrupt in 2017, two new teams were created and joined the Italian Lower Divisions: ASD Vigor Lamezia Calcio 1919 (which joined the 7th division) and ASD Vigor 1919 (which joined the 9th division).

In June 2020, the two teams were merged, and the new resulting club started climbing up the league, reaching fifth-tier regional Eccellenza in 2023.

== Colors and Badge ==
The team's colours are green and white.

== Stadium ==
Vigor Lamezia plays at the Stadio Guido D'Ippolito which has a capacity of 3,730.
