= List of Italian football transfers summer 2013 (July) =

This is a list of Italian football transfers featuring at least one Serie A or Serie B club which were completed after the end of the 2012–13 season and before the end of the 2013 summer transfer window. The window formally opened on 2 July and closed on 2 September 2013 (two months), but Lega Serie A and Lega Serie B accepted to document any transfer before that day; however, those players would only able to play for their new clubs at the start of the 2012–13 season. Free agents could join any club at any time.

This list does not include co-ownership resolutions, which had to be renewed or resolved no later than 20 June 2013.

== June to July 2013 ==
Legend

- Those clubs in Italic indicated that the player already left on loan in previous season or 2013 new signing that immediately left the club
- Non-EU transfer from and to abroad were marked yellow, excluding loan deal that turned definitive and renewed loans. Serie A clubs could only signed 2 non-EU players from abroad by certain criteria, such as replace departed non-EU player or the club completely did not have non-EU players.

Date	Name	Moving from	Moving to	Fee
24 January 2013 (Note: The player contract will be effective on 1 July 2013)	Fernando Llorente	Athletic Bilbao (Spain)	Juventus	Free
1 February 2013	Hugo Campagnaro	Napoli	Internazionale	Free
20 February 2013	Marco Andreolli	Chievo	Internazionale	Free
14 March 2013	Juan Pablo Carrizo	Lazio	Internazionale	Free (Note: The player already played for his new club in 2012–13 season, the deal turned from temporary to definitive.)
20 March 2013	Gonzalo Mastriani	Cerro (Uruguay)	Parma	Free
16 April 2013	Sebastián Leto (Argentina)	Unattached	Catania	Free
22 May 2013	Oleksandr Yakovenko (Note: The player also holds Belgian passport.)	Anderlecht (Belgium)	Fiorentina	Free
24 May 2013	Cristián Zapata (Colombia)	Villarreal (Spain)	Milan	Undisclosed
28 May 2013	Abdallah Yaisien	Paris Saint-Germain (France)	Bologna	Undisclosed
29 May 2013	Daniele Padelli	Udinese	Torino	Free
31 May 2013	Marcos Alonso	Bolton Wanderers (England)	Fiorentina	Free
5 June 2013	Maarten Stekelenburg	Roma	Fulham (England)	€5.6M
13 June 2013	Nicola Capellini	Bologna	Cesena	Free
13 June 2013	Joaquín	Málaga (Spain)	Fiorentina	Undisclosed
14 June 2013	Yohan Tavares	Standard Liège (Belgium)	Chievo	Undisclosed
17 June 2013	Antonio Candreva	Udinese	Lazio	Co-ownership, €1.7M
17 June 2013	Matteo Bianchetti	Internazionale	Verona	Co-ownership
17 June 2013	Alessandro Agostini	Torino	Verona	Undisclosed
17 June 2013	Raphael Martinho (Note: The player also hold EU citizenship.)	Catania	Verona	Co-ownership
17 June 2013	Simon Laner	Albinoleffe	Verona	Co-ownership
17 June 2013	Federico Peluso	Atalanta	Juventus	€4.8M
18 June 2013	Pablo Armero (Colombia)	Udinese	Napoli	Co-ownership
18 June 2013	Gustavo Munúa (Note: The player also holds Spanish nationality.)	Levante (Spain)	Fiorentina	Free
18 June 2013	Antonio Gammone	Bari	Como	Co-ownership
19 June 2013	Davide Bertoncini	Genoa	Frosinone	Co-ownership
19 June 2013	Leonardo Blanchard	Siena	Frosinone	€1,000
19 June 2013	Antonio Piccolo	Livorno	Lanciano	Co-ownership
19 June 2013	Alexander Farnerud	Young Boys (Switzerland)	Torino	Undisclosed
19 June 2013	Fabrizio Cacciatore	Sampdoria	Verona	Co-ownership
19 June 2013	Steve Von Bergen	Palermo	(Switzerland) Young Boys	Undisclosed
19 June 2013	Daniele Corvia	Lecce	Brescia	€180,000
19 June 2013	Bruno Fernandes	Novara	Udinese	Co-ownership
20 June 2013	Francesco Della Rocca	Palermo	Bologna	Loan (between co-owner)
20 June 2013	Francesco Signori	Sampdoria	Modena	Co-ownership
20 June 2013	Yohan Benalouane (Note: The player also holds French nationality.)	Cesena	Parma	Co-ownership
20 June 2013	Giuseppe Rizzo	Reggina	Pescara	Co-ownership
20 June 2013	Leandro Campagna	Frosinone	Parma	Co-ownership, €600,000 (swap with D.Ciofani)
21 June 2013	Giulio Donati	Internazionale	Bayer Leverkusen (Germany)	Undisclosed
21 June 2013	Mattia Destro	Genoa	Roma	€4.5M
21 June 2013	Cristiano Biraghi	Internazionale	Cittadella	Co-ownership
21 June 2013	Andrea De Vito	Cittadella	Avellino	Undisclosed
24 June 2013	Damjan Đoković	Cesena	Bologna	Co-ownership (swap with Ingegneri)
24 June 2013	Andrea Ingegneri	Bologna	Cesena	Co-ownership (swap with Đoković)
25 June 2013	Damjan Đoković	Bologna (& Cesena, c)	Cluj (Romania)	Loan
25 June 2013	Dries Mertens	PSV (Netherlands)	Napoli	Undisclosed
25 June 2013	Massimo Donati	Palermo	Verona	Undisclosed
25 June 2013	Carlos Embalo	Chaves (Portugal)	Palermo	Undisclosed
26 June 2013	Kyle Lafferty	Sion (Switzerland)	Palermo	Undisclosed
26 June 2013	Guillermo Rodriguez (Uruguay)	Peñarol (Uruguay)	Torino	Undisclosed
26 June 2013	Eros Schiavon	Cittadella	Avellino	Undisclosed
26 June 2013	Eugenio Calvarese	Pescara	Catanzaro	Co-ownership
26 June 2013	Luca Caldirola	Internazionale	(Germany) Werder Bremen	€2.5M
26 June 2013	Carlos Tevez (Note: The player also holds Italian nationality.)	Manchester City (England)	Juventus	€9M
27 June 2013	Nicolò Lini	Brescia (youth)	Cesena	Co-ownership, €600,000 (swap with Canini)
27 June 2013	Manuel Canini	Cesena	Brescia	Co-ownership, €600,000 (swap with Lini)
27 June 2013	Daniele Gragnoli	Ascoli	Parma	Co-ownership, €1.6 million (swap with Storani)
27 June 2013	Emiliano Storani	Parma	Ascoli	Co-ownership, €1.6 million (swap with Gragnoli)
27 June 2013	Kamil Vacek	Chievo	Sparta Prague (Czech Republic)	Loan
28 June 2013	Alejandro González	Peñarol (Uruguay)	Verona	Undisclosed
28 June 2013	Andres Sampedro (Venezuela)	Parma (youth)	Mineros (Venezuela)	Loan
28 June 2013	Mário Rui	Parma	Empoli	Co-ownership, €550,000
29 June 2013	Marco Paolini	Cesena (youth)	Parma	Co-ownership, €1M (swap with Adorni)
29 June 2013	Davide Adorni	Parma	Cesena	Co-ownership, €1M (swap with Paolini)
29 June 2013	Miloš Malivojević	Parma	Vicenza	Co-ownership, €600,000 (swap with Sandrini)
29 June 2013	Mattia Sandrini	Vicenza	Parma	Co-ownership, €600,000 (swap with Malivojević)
29 June 2013	Mattia Filippi	Cesena	Vicenza	Co-ownership, €450,000 (swap with Capitanio)
29 June 2013	Filippo Capitanio	Vicenza	Cesena	Co-ownership, €450,000 (swap with Filippi)
29 June 2013	Carlos Javier Acuña	(Spain) Girona	Udinese	Undisclosed
29 June 2013	Carlos Javier Acuña	Udinese	Watford (England)	Loan
29 June 2013	Fabio Lebran	Parma	Crotone	Co-ownership, €400,000 (swap with Loviso)
29 June 2013	Massimo Loviso	Crotone	Parma	Co-ownership, €400,000 (swap with Lebran)
29 June 2013	Alex Cordaz	Cittadella	Parma	Free
30 June 2013	Daniel Ciofani	Parma	Frosinone	Co-ownership, €600,000 (swap with Campagna)
30 June 2013	Solomon Enow (Cameroon)	Parma	Gorica (Slovenia)	€1M
1 July 2013	Emanuele Testardi	Sampdoria	Honvéd (Hungary)	Loan
1 July 2013	Jonathan Rossini	Sampdoria	Sassuolo	Co-ownership, €1.5 million
1 July 2013	Luca Calapai	Catania	Modena	Co-ownership
1 July 2013	Davide Di Gennaro	Spezia	Palermo	Free
1 July 2013	Arturo Lupoli	Grosseto	Varese	Free
1 July 2013	Caetano Calil	Crotone	Varese	Free
1 July 2013	Luca Antei	Roma	Sassuolo	Co-ownership, €500,000
1 July 2013	Matteo Politano	Roma	Pescara	Co-ownership, €500,000 (part of Caprari)
1 July 2013	Federico Viviani	Roma	Pescara	Loan
1 July 2013	Giammario Piscitella	Roma	Pescara	Co-ownership, €1.5M (part of Caprari)
1 July 2013	Filippo Lora	Milan (youth)	Cittadella	Co-ownership
1 July 2013	Mattia Minesso	Vicenza	Cittadella	Undisclosed
1 July 2013	Fabio Lebran	Crotone (& Parma, c)	Gorica (Slovenia)	Loan
1 July 2013	Gianluca Lapadula	Parma	Gorica (Slovenia)	Loan
1 July 2013	Alex Cordaz	Parma	Gorica (Slovenia)	Loan
1 July 2013	Bright Addae (Ghana)	Parma	Gorica (Slovenia)	Loan
1 July 2013	Desiderio Garufo	Nocerina	Trapani	Free
2 July 2013	Gennaro Troianiello	Sassuolo	Palermo	Undisclosed
2 July 2013	Jasmin Kurtić	Palermo	Sassuolo	Co-ownership
2 July 2013	Laurenţiu Brănescu	Juventus	Juve Stabia	Loan
2 July 2013	Riccardo Improta	Genoa	Chievo	Loan
2 July 2013	Dario Maltese	Palermo	Latina	Co-ownership
2 July 2013	Denis Tonucci	Cesena	Ajaccio (France)	Undisclosed
2 July 2013	Paolo Marchi	Varese	Como	Undisclosed
2 July 2013	Luca Tremolada	Como	Internazionale	Co-ownership resolution
2 July 2013	Enrico Tonozzi	Novara	South Tyrol	Loan
3 July 2013	Guido Di Deo	Ternana	Benevento	Free
3 July 2013	Daniele Mori	Udinese	Novara	Loan
3 July 2013	Luca Ceccarelli	Verona	Spezia	Undisclosed
3 July 2013	Antonio Cassano	Internazionale	Parma	Undisclosed
3 July 2013	Nicola Bellomo	Bari (& Chievo, c)	Torino (& Chievo, c)	Undisclosed (transfer of co-ownership)
3 July 2013	Alfred Gomis	Torino	Crotone	Loan
3 July 2013	Dario Župarić	Cibalia (Croatia)	Pescara	Undisclosed
3 July 2013	Luka Krajnc	Genoa	Cesena	Loan
3 July 2013	Nwankwo (Nigeria)	Parma	Cluj (Romania)	Undisclosed
3 July 2013	Nicola Russo	Parma	Gubbio	Loan
3 July 2013	Gianluca Turchetta	Cesena	Südtirol	Loan
3 July 2013	Raffaele Di Gennaro	Internazionale	Cittadella	Loan
3 July 2013	Giovanni La Camera	Pavia	Cittadella	Free
4 July 2013	Luca Ghiringhelli	Milan	Juve Stabia	Undisclosed
4 July 2013	Ettore Mendicino	Lazio	Salernitana	Loan
4 July 2013	Luca Tremolada	Internazionale	Varese	Co-ownership
4 July 2013	Idriz Toskić (Montenegro)	Bari	Chievo	Co-ownership
4 July 2013	Massimo Paci	Siena	Brescia	Free
4 July 2013	Filip Pivkovski	Blackburn (England)	Novara	Free
4 July 2013	Manuel Coppola	Siena (& Parma, c)	Cesena	Loan
5 July 2013	Matteo Grandi	Cesena	Pergolettese	?
5 July 2013	Elio De Silvestro	Pro Vercelli	Juventus	Co-ownership resolution
5 July 2013	Nazzareno Belfasti	Juventus	Pro Vercelli	Co-ownership
5 July 2013	Giuseppe Ruggiero	Juventus (youth)	Pro Vercelli	Co-ownership
5 July 2013	Stefano Padovan	Juventus (youth)	Pescara	Loan
5 July 2013	Bojan Jokić	Chievo	(Spain) Villarreal	Free
5 July 2013	Gonçalo Brandão	Parma (& Siena, c)	(Romania) Cluj	Loan
5 July 2013	Ishak Belfodil	Parma	Internazionale	Co-ownership
5 July 2013	Francesco Zampano	Entella	Verona	Undisclosed
5 July 2013	Daniele Borra	Entella	Verona	Loan
5 July 2013	Filippo De Col	Entella	Verona	Co-ownership
5 July 2013	Luca Toni	Fiorentina	Verona	Free
5 July 2013	Simone Pecorini	Internazionale	Cittadella	Co-ownership
5 July 2013	Emanuele Pesoli	Verona	Carpi	Undisclosed
5 July 2013	Maikol Negro	Nocerina	Latina	Co-ownership
5 July 2013	Federico Freire	Vélez (Argentina)	Catania	Free
6 July 2013	Denis Alibec	Internazionale	Bologna	Loan
6 July 2013	Soufiane Bidaoui (Morocco)	Lierse (Belgium)	Parma	Free
6 July 2013	Pedro Mendes	Sporting B (Portugal)	Parma	Free
6 July 2013	Filip Janković (Serbia)	Red Star Belgrade (Serbia)	Parma	Free
6 July 2013	Eduardo Carvalho	Genoa	Braga	Loan
6 July 2013	Kristijan Ipša (Croatia)	Midtjylland (Denmark)	Reggina	Undisclosed
6 July 2013	Danilo Avelar (Brazil)	Karpaty Lviv (Ukraine)	Cagliari	Undisclosed
6 July 2013	Boadu Acosty	Fiorentina	Chievo	Loan
8 July 2013	Simone Magnaghi	Atalanta	Entella	Loan
8 July 2013	Mario Gómez	Bayern Munich (Germany)	Fiorentina	Undisclosed
8 July 2013	Marios Ikonomou	PAS Giannina (Greece)	Cagliari	Undisclosed
8 July 2013	Sergiu Suciu	Torino	Juve Stabia	Loan
8 July 2013	Felipe (Brazil)	Fiorentina	Parma	Undisclosed
8 July 2013	Matteo Brighi	Roma	Torino	Undisclosed
8 July 2013	Gianluca Curci	Roma	Bologna	Loan
8 July 2013	Marco D'Alessandro	Roma	Cesena	Loan
8 July 2013	José Ángel	Roma	Real Sociedad (Spain)	Loan
8 July 2013	Diego Novaretti (Argentina)	Toluca (Mexico)	Lazio	Free
8 July 2013	Tonći Kukoč	Hajduk (Croatia)	Brescia	Undisclosed
9 July 2013	Felipe Anderson (Brazil)	Santos (Brazil)	Lazio	Undisclosed
9 July 2013	Simone Zaza	Sampdoria	Juventus	€3.5M
9 July 2013	Mauro Icardi	Sampdoria	Internazionale	Co-ownership
9 July 2013	Manolo Gabbiadini	Atalanta (& Juventus, c)	Sampdoria (& Juventus, c)	€5.5M (transfer of Co-ownership)
9 July 2013	Simone Zaza	Juventus	Sassuolo	Co-ownership, €2.5M
9 July 2013	Francesco Acerbi	Genoa	Sassuolo	Co-ownership
9 July 2013	Luca Rizzo	Sampdoria	Modena	Loan
9 July 2013	Stefano D'Agostino	Sampdoria	Pontedera	Loan
9 July 2013	Paweł Wszołek	Polonia Warsaw (Poland)	Sampdoria	Free
9 July 2013	Rolando Bianchi	Torino	Bologna	Free
9 July 2013	Cesare Bovo	Genoa	Torino	Undisclosed
9 July 2013	Luigi Giorgi	Novara	Atalanta	Undisclosed
9 July 2013	Valerio Nava	Atalanta	Novara	Loan
9 July 2013	Alberto Almici	Atalanta	Cesena	Loan
9 July 2013	Amedeo Benedetti	Chievo	Lumezzane	Loan
9 July 2013	Alberto Masi	Juventus	Ternana	Co-ownership, €2M
9 July 2013	Alexandros Tzorvas	Genoa	Apollon Smyrnis (Greece)	Free
9 July 2013	Francesco Bardi	Internazionale	Livorno	Loan
9 July 2013	Cristiano Piccini	Fiorentina	Livorno	Loan
9 July 2013	Marco Benassi	Internazionale	Livorno	Loan
9 July 2013	Andrea Rossi	Parma (& Siena, c)	Pescara	Loan
9 July 2013	Paolo Frascatore	Roma	Pescara	Loan
9 July 2013	Alessandro Bruno	Nocerina	Latina	Free
10 July 2013	Giorgos Katidis	AEK Athens (Greece)	Novara	Undisclosed
10 July 2013	Giovanni Marchese	Catania	Genoa	Free
10 July 2013	Sebastian De Maio	Brescia	Genoa	Free
10 July 2013	Lucas Finazzi	Chievo	Brescia	Loan
10 July 2013	Samuel Di Carmine	Cittadella	Juve Stabia	Undisclosed
10 July 2013	Andrea Mazzarani	Udinese	Modena	Co-ownership
10 July 2013	Andrea Lisuzzo	Novara	Spezia	Undisclosed
10 July 2013	Nii Nortey Ashong (Ghana)	Fiorentina	Spezia	Loan
10 July 2013	Matteo Solini	Chievo	Reggiana	Loan
10 July 2013	Valerio Anastasi	Chievo	Reggiana	Co-ownership
10 July 2013	Federico Scappi	Reggiana	Chievo	Co-ownership
10 July 2013	Federico Scappi	Chievo	Reggiana	Loan
10 July 2013	Mario Paglialunga	Catania	Zaragoza (Spain)	Undisclosed
10 July 2013	Tin Jedvaj	Dinamo Zagreb (Croatia)	Roma	€5M
10 July 2013	Alessandro Iacobucci	Parma	Latina	Loan
10 July 2013	Riccardo Brosco	Parma	Latina	Loan
10 July 2013	Juri Cisotti	Chievo	Latina	Loan
10 July 2013	Gianluca Di Chiara	Palermo	Latina	Loan
11 July 2013	Matteo Ciofani	Ternana	Frosinone	Free
11 July 2013	Nicola Braccalenti	Foligno	Palermo	Loan
11 July 2013	Massimo Volta	Sampdoria	Cesena	Loan
11 July 2013	Emiliano Moretti	Genoa	Torino	Undisclosed
11 July 2013	Lorenzo Del Prete	Novara	Crotone	Loan
11 July 2013	Michele Cremonesi	Cremonese	Crotone	Undisclosed
11 July 2013	Giulio Migliaccio	Palermo	Atalanta	Undisclosed
11 July 2013	Constantin Nica	Dinamo București (Romania)	Atalanta	Undisclosed
11 July 2013	Andrea Poli	Sampdoria	Milan	Co-ownership
11 July 2013	Bartosz Salamon	Milan	Sampdoria	Co-ownership
11 July 2013	Lukas Spendlhofer	Internazionale	Varese	Loan
11 July 2013	Elvis Abbruscato	Pescara	Cremonese	Free
11 July 2013	Simone Colombi	Atalanta	Padova	Loan
11 July 2013	Giuseppe De Feudis	Padova	Cesena	Undisclosed
11 July 2013	José Callejón	Real Madrid (Spain)	Napoli	Undisclosed
11 July 2013	Rafael Cabral (Brazil)	Santos (Brazil)	Napoli	Undisclosed
11 July 2013	Daniel Cappelletti	Palermo	Südtirol	Loan
11 July 2013	Alessandro Micai	Palermo	Südtirol	Co-ownership
11 July 2013	Simone Branca	Novara	Südtirol	Free
11 July 2013	Pierluigi Bastone	Milan	Südtirol	Undisclosed
11 July 2013	Simone Dell'Agnello	Livorno	Südtirol	Loan
11 July 2013	Francesco Vassallo	Palermo	Südtirol	Loan
11 July 2013	Andrea Molinelli	Livorno	Südtirol	Co-ownership, €30,000
11 July 2013	Caleb Ekuban	Chievo	Südtirol	Loan
11 July 2013	Angelo Ogbonna	Torino	Juventus	€13M
11 July 2013	Giuseppe Fornito	Napoli	Pescara	Loan
11 July 2013	Alen Stevanović	Torino	Palermo	Loan
11 July 2013	Alessio Sestu	Siena	Chievo	Free
11 July 2013	Federico Moretti	Catania	Spezia	Loan
11 July 2013	Ivano Baldanzeddu	Juve Stabia	Spezia (& Verona, c)	Free
11 July 2013	Francesco Migliore	Crotone	Spezia (& Verona, c)	Free
11 July 2013	Stefan Ristovski	Parma	Latina	Loan
12 July 2013	Marco Bortoli	Milan	Bassano	Loan
12 July 2013	Loris Bacchetti	Pescara	Catanzaro	Loan
12 July 2013	Manuel Sarao	Lecco	Carpi	Free
12 July 2013	Manuel Sarao	Carpi	Savona	Co-ownership, Undisclosed
12 July 2013	Omar El Kaddouri	Napoli	Torino	Loan
12 July 2013	Lorenzo De Silvestri	Fiorentina	Sampdoria	Loan
12 July 2013	Raffaele Dalle Vedove	Internazionale	Lumezzane	Co-ownership
12 July 2013	Lorenzo Crisetig	Parma (& Internazionale, c)	Crotone	Loan
12 July 2013	Emanuele Suagher	Atalanta	Crotone	Loan
12 July 2013	Simone Salviato	Livorno	Novara	Undisclosed
12 July 2013	Linus Hallenius	Genoa	Aarau (Switzerland)	Undisclosed
12 July 2013	Pape Moussa Konaté (Senegal)	Krasnodar (Russia)	Genoa	Loan
12 July 2013	Ciro Immobile	Genoa (& Juventus, c)	Torino (& Juventus, c)	€2.75M (transfer of co-ownership)
12 July 2013	Pablo Granoche	Chievo	Cesena	Loan
12 July 2013	Francesco Renzetti	Padova	Cesena	Free
12 July 2013	Michele Camporese	Fiorentina	Cesena	Loan
12 July 2013	Moro Alhassan	Genoa	Cesena	Loan
12 July 2013	Luca Bertoni	Milan	Carpi	Co-ownership
12 July 2013	Simone Romagnoli	Pescara	Carpi	Free
12 July 2013	Ádám Kovácsik	Reggina	Carpi	Loan
12 July 2013	Matteo Liviero	Juventus	Carpi	Loan
12 July 2013	Radoslav Kirilov (Hungary)	Chievo	Carpi	Loan
12 July 2013	Michelangelo Albertazzi	Milan	Verona	Co-ownership
12 July 2013	Fabrizio Paghera	Brescia	Lanciano	Co-ownership
12 July 2013	Nadir Minotti	Atalanta	Lanciano	Loan
12 July 2013	Rodrigo Alborno (Paraguay)	Internazionale	Cittadella	Loan
12 July 2013	Šime Vrsaljko	Dinamo Zagreb (Croatia)	Genoa	Undisclosed
12 July 2013	Pelé	Milan	Olhanense (Portugal)	Loan
13 July 2013	Marco Martina Rini	Brescia	Cremonese	Loan
13 July 2013	Andrea Doninelli	Genoa	Juve Stabia	Co-ownership
13 July 2013	Osarimen Ebagua	Varese	Spezia	Free
13 July 2013	Mehdi Benatia	Udinese	Roma	€13.5M (€10M cash + 50% Verre & N.López)
13 July 2013	Valerio Verre	Roma	Udinese	Co-ownership, €2.5M
13 July 2013	Nicolás López (Uruguay)	Roma	Udinese	Co-ownership, €1M
13 July 2013	Andrea Rossini	Parma	Cesena	Loan (between co-owner)
13 July 2013	Łukasz Skorupski	Roma	Górnik Zabrze (Poland)	€0.89M
13 July 2013	Daniele Martinelli	Vicenza	Trapani	Loan
13 July 2013	Maurizio Ciaramitaro	Modena	Trapani	Free
13 July 2013	Francesco Finocchio	Parma	Trapani	Loan
13 July 2013	Juan Fernando Quintero (Colombia)	Pescara	Porto (Portugal)	€5M (50%)
13 July 2013	Gastón Cellerino	Livorno	Santiago Wanderers (Chile)	Undisclosed
13 July 2013	Alessandro Favalli	Cremonese	Parma	Co-ownership
14 July 2013	Francesco Di Nunzio	Sorrento	Juve Stabia	Free
14 July 2013	Francesco Zampano	Verona	Juve Stabia	Loan
14 July 2013	Richard Marcone	Vicenza	Trapani	Loan
15 July 2013	Gianluigi Bamonte	Cesena	San Marino	Free
15 July 2013	Fabrizio Miccoli	Palermo	Lecce	Free
15 July 2013	Mame Baba Thiam (Senegal)	Internazionale	Lanciano	Free
15 July 2013	Giannis Potouridis	Olympiacos (Greece)	Novara	Undisclosed
15 July 2013	Sébastien Frey	Genoa	Bursaspor (Turkey)	Undisclosed
15 July 2013	Camillo Ciano	Napoli	Padova	Loan
15 July 2013	Federico Melchiorri	Maceratese	Padova	Undisclosed
15 July 2013	Riccardo Fochesato	Chievo	Pro Vercelli	Co-ownership
15 July 2013	Tony Huston (France)	Verona	Pro Vercelli	Loan
15 July 2013	Guido Gomez	Sassuolo	Pro Vercelli	Co-ownership
15 July 2013	Daniel Bessa	Internazionale	Olhanense (Portugal)	Loan
15 July 2013	Vid Belec	Internazionale	Olhanense (Portugal)	Loan
15 July 2013	Massimo Loviso	Parma (& Crotone, c)	Cremonese	Loan
16 July 2013	Francis Obeng (Ghana)	Carpi	Santarcangelo	Loan
16 July 2013	Mattia Negri	Carpi (youth)	Santarcangelo	Loan
16 July 2013	Giacomo Cenetti	Carpi	Bassano	Undisclosed
16 July 2013	Aniello Cutolo	Padova	Pescara	Undisclosed
16 July 2013	Simone Pasa	Internazionale	Varese	Loan
16 July 2013	Manuele Blasi	Pescara	Varese	Free
16 July 2013	Pavol Farkaš	Chievo	Ternana	Loan
16 July 2013	Edinson Cavani	Napoli	Paris Saint-Germain (France)	Undisclosed
16 July 2013	Enis Nadarevic (Bosnia and Herzegovina)	Genoa	Cesena	Loan
16 July 2013	Luciano Fabián Monzón	Lyon (France)	Catania	€3.3M + bonus €0.3M
16 July 2013	Sergio Viotti	Chievo	Juve Stabia	Loan
17 July 2013	Pasquale Turi	Pavia	Siena	Undisclosed
17 July 2013	Ivan Radovanović (Serbia)	Atalanta	Chievo	Undisclosed
17 July 2013	Salvatore Molina	Atalanta	Modena	Loan
17 July 2013	Doudou Mangni	Atalanta	Modena	Loan
17 July 2013	Edgar Çani	Catania	Carpi	Loan
17 July 2013	Alessandro Tonti	Cesena	Forlì	Loan
17 July 2013	Giovanni Zandrini	Venezia	Reggina	Free
18 July 2013	Ezequiel Cirigliano	River Plate (Argentina)	Verona	Loan
18 July 2013	Uroš Palibrk	Milan	Triglav (Slovenia)	Undisclosed
18 July 2013	Maicon (Brazil)	Manchester City (England)	Roma	Free
18 July 2013	Stevan Jovetić (Montenegro)	Fiorentina	Manchester City (England)	Undisclosed
18 July 2013	Timothy Nocchi	Juventus	Carpi	Loan
18 July 2013	Adrián Calello	Siena	Chievo	Free
18 July 2013	Pablo Eduardo Caballero (Uruguay)	Cerro Porteño (Paraguay)	Reggina	Undisclosed
18 July 2013	Ousmane Dramé	Padova	Venezia	Loan
18 July 2013	Marius Alexe	Dinamo București (Romania)	Sassuolo	Loan
18 July 2013	Leonardo Gatto	Atalanta	Lanciano	Loan
18 July 2013	Gianmarco De Feo	Milan	Lanciano	Undisclosed
19 July 2013	Antonio Caracciolo	Brescia	Cremonese	Loan
19 July 2013	Claudio Terzi	Siena	Palermo	Undisclosed
19 July 2013	Christian Battocchio	Udinese	Watford (England)	Undisclosed
19 July 2013	Diego Fabbrini	Udinese	Watford (England)	Undisclosed
19 July 2013	Marco Davide Faraoni	Udinese	Watford (England)	Undisclosed
19 July 2013	Gabriele Angella	Udinese	Watford (England)	Undisclosed
19 July 2013	Marco Cassetti	Udinese	Watford (England)	Undisclosed
19 July 2013	Almen Abdi	Udinese	Watford (England)	Undisclosed
19 July 2013	Panagiotis Tachtsidis	Genoa	Catania	Co-ownership
19 July 2013	Francesco Lodi	Catania	Genoa	Co-ownership
19 July 2013	Jacopo Dezi	Napoli	Crotone	Loan
19 July 2013	Alessandro Ligi	Crotone	Parma	Co-ownership
19 July 2013	Denilson Gabionetta	Crotone	Parma	Undisclosed
19 July 2013	Mario Yepes	Milan	Atalanta	Free
19 July 2013	Álvaro Ampuero	Parma	Padova	Loan
19 July 2013	Manuel Pamić	Sparta Prague (Czech Republic)	Chievo	Loan
19 July 2013	Andrea Seculin	Fiorentina	Chievo	Undisclosed
19 July 2013	Andrea Seculin	Chievo	Avellino	Loan
19 July 2013	Kevin Strootman	PSV (Netherlands)	Roma	€16.5M
19 July 2013	Marquinhos (Brazil)	Roma	Paris Saint-Germain (France)	€31.4M
19 July 2013	Antonio Meola	Livorno	Paganese	Loan
19 July 2013	Agostino Garofalo	Siena	Modena	Loan
19 July 2013	Modibo Diakité	Lazio	Sunderland (England)	Free
20 July 2013	Boško Janković	Genoa	Verona	Loan
20 July 2013	Diego Cenciarelli	Fiorentina	Teramo	Co-ownership
20 July 2013	Felipe Melo (Brazil)	Juventus	Galatasaray (Turkey)	€3.75M
20 July 2013	Mirko Antenucci	Catania	Ternana	Loan
20 July 2013	Leonardo Pérez	Pisa	Cittadella	Co-ownership, Undisclosed
21 July 2013	Raúl Albiol	Real Madrid (Spain)	Napoli	Undisclosed
21 July 2013	Sebastián Ribas	Genoa	Barcelona S.C. (Ecuador)	Loan
21 July 2013	Dario Cascione	Bari	Barletta	Loan
22 July 2013	Simone Benedetti	Internazionale	Padova	Loan
22 July 2013	Cristian Gabriel Chávez (Argentina)	Napoli	PAS Giannina (Greece)	Undisclosed
22 July 2013	Andrea Sala	Pro Patria	Ternana	Loan
22 July 2013	Marco Baldan	Nocerina	Latina	Loan
23 July 2013	Danilo Soddimo	Pescara	Frosinone	Undisclosed
23 July 2013	Carlo Pinsoglio	Vicenza (& Juventus, c)	Modena	Loan
23 July 2013	Angelo Di Stasio	Modena	Vicenza	Undisclosed
23 July 2013	Pietro Terracciano	Catania	Avellino	Loan
23 July 2013	Soufiane Bidaoui	Parma	Crotone	Loan
23 July 2013	Nikola Maksimović	Red Star Belgrade (Serbia)	Torino	Undisclosed
23 July 2013	Lucas Biglia	Anderlecht (Belgium)	Lazio	Undisclosed
23 July 2013	Gianluca Freddi	Reggina	Brescia	Undisclosed
23 July 2013	Niccolò Belloni	Internazionale	Modena	Co-ownership
23 July 2013	Josip Iličić	Palermo	Fiorentina	Undisclosed
23 July 2013	Andrea Esposito	Lecce	Latina	Free
23 July 2013	Luca Crescenzi	Lazio	Siena	Loan
23 July 2013	Luigi Monopoli	Bari	Paganese	Loan
24 July 2013	Nahuel Valentini	Rosario (Argentina)	Livorno	Undisclosed
24 July 2013	Fabio Sciacca	Catania	Ternana	Loan
24 July 2013	Giuseppe Prestia	Palermo	Parma	Free
24 July 2013	Jacopo Sala	Hamburger SV (Germany)	Verona	Undisclosed
24 July 2013	Josip Elez	Hajduk (Croatia)	Lazio	Undisclosed
24 July 2013	Raffaele Maiello	Napoli	Ternana	Loan
25 July 2013	Yohan Tavares	Chievo	Estoril (Portugal)	Undisclosed
25 July 2013	Morgan De Sanctis	Napoli	Roma	€0.5M
25 July 2013	Mirko Bigazzi	Livorno	Olhanense (Portugal)	Loan
25 July 2013	Nicolás Gorobsov	Torino	Timişoara (Romania)	Loan
25 July 2013	Marco Ezio Fossati	Milan	Bari	Loan
26 July 2013	Mauro Zárate	Lazio	Vélez (Argentina)	Free (unilaterally breach of contract)
26 July 2013	Gianmarco Gabbianelli	Internazionale	Pro Patria	Co-ownership
26 July 2013	Diego Mella	Internazionale	Pro Patria	Loan
26 July 2013	Bocar Djumo	Internazionale	União (Portugal)	Loan
26 July 2013	Santiago Morero	Chievo	Siena	Free
26 July 2013	Francesco Benussi	Palermo	Udinese	Free
26 July 2013	Gianluca Maran	Catania	Bassano	Co-ownership
26 July 2013	Fabio Aveni	Catania	Perugia	Loan
26 July 2013	Gennaro Scognamiglio	Parma	Perugia	Loan
26 July 2013	Francesco Modesto	Parma	Padova	Undisclosed
26 July 2013	Bruno Leonardo Vicente	Padova	Parma	Undisclosed
26 July 2013	Vincenzo Rennella	Genoa	Betis (Spain)	Undisclosed
26 July 2013	Nnamdi Oduamadi	Milan	Brescia	Loan
26 July 2013	Anselmo (Brazil)	Palermo	São Caetano (Brazil)	Free
27 July 2013	Gonzalo Higuaín	Real Madrid (Spain)	Napoli	Undisclosed
27 July 2013	Rodney Strasser	Milan	Genoa	Undisclosed
27 July 2013	Kévin Constant	Genoa	Milan	Co-ownership resolution
27 July 2013	Dídac Vilà	Milan	Betis (Spain)	Loan
27 July 2013	Lapis Kiakis	Verona	Carpi	Loan
28 July 2013	Juan Surraco	Udinese	Modena	Undisclosed
28 July 2013	Riccardo Martignago	Cittadella	Catanzaro	Co-ownership
29 July 2013	Pepe Reina	Liverpool (England)	Napoli	Loan
29 July 2013	Ledian Memushaj	Lecce	Carpi	Loan
29 July 2013	Cosimo Chiricò	Lecce	Parma	Co-ownership
29 July 2013	Cosimo Chiricò	Parma	Latina	Loan
30 July 2013	Leandro Greco	Olympiacos (Greece)	Livorno	Undisclosed
30 July 2013	Mario Santana	Napoli	Genoa	Undisclosed
30 July 2013	Nicola Leali	Juventus	Spezia	Loan
30 July 2013	Abou Diop	Torino	Juve Stabia	Loan
30 July 2013	Fabio Daprelà	Brescia	Palermo	Undisclosed
30 July 2013	Simone Sini	Roma	Perugia	Co-ownership
30 July 2013	Claudio Santini	Borgo-a-Buggiano	Empoli	Free
31 July 2013	Marcelo Larrondo	Siena	Torino	Co-ownership
31 July 2013	Elvis Kabashi	Empoli	Juventus	Undisclosed
31 July 2013	Daniele Rugani	Empoli	Juventus	Co-ownership
31 July 2013	Daniele Rugani	Juventus	Empoli	Loan
31 July 2013	Gianni Munari	Sampdoria	Parma	Undisclosed
31 July 2013	Nélson	Palermo	Almería (Spain)	Loan
31 July 2013	Luigi Sepe	Napoli	Virtus Lanciano	Loan
31 July 2013	Antonio Zito	Juve Stabia	Ternana	Undisclosed
31 July 2013	Afriyie Acquah (Ghana)	TSG Hoffenheim (Germany)	Parma	Loan
31 July 2013	Nicolás Bianchi Arce	Pescara	Banfield (Argentina)	Loan
