= Obeng =

Obeng is a surname. Notable people with the surname include:

- Curtis Obeng (born 1989), English footballer
- Eddie Obeng (born 1959), British educator and writer
- Ernest Obeng (born 1956), Ghanaian sprinter
- Francis Obeng (born 1986) Ghanaian footballer
- James Kojo Obeng, Ghanaian politician and teacher
- Kwadwo Obeng Junior (born 1999), Ghanaian professional footballer
- Letitia Obeng (1925–2023), first Ghanaian woman to obtain a degree in zoology and the first to be awarded a doctorate
- Michael K. Obeng (born 1973), American plastic surgeon
- Paul Victor Obeng (1947–2014), Ghanaian mechanical engineer and politician
- Richard Emmanuel Obeng (1877–1951), Ghanaian writer
- Richard Obeng (born 1981), Ghanaian politician
- Samuel Obeng (born 1997), Ghanaian footballer
- Samuel Obeng (linguist), professor of linguistics at Indiana University
- Seth Obeng (born 1945), Ghanaian soldier
- William Obeng (born 1983), American football player
