= List of Italian football transfers summer 2013 =

List of Italian football transfers summer 2013 may refer to:

- List of Italian football transfers summer 2013 (co-ownership)
- List of Italian football transfers summer 2013 (July)
- List of Italian football transfers summer 2013 (August)
