= Andrea Caroppo (footballer) =

Italian footballer (born 1990)

Personal information
- Date of birth: 18 July 1990 (age 36)
- Place of birth: Lecce, Italy
- Height: 1.91 m (6 ft 3 in)
- Position: Goalkeeper

Youth career
- Brescia
- 2009–2010: → Olbia (loan)
- 2010: → Palermo (loan)

Senior career*
Years	Team	Apps	(Gls)
2010–2011	Verona	0	(0)
2011–2013	Brescia	1	(0)
2013–2014	Bellaria	17	(0)
2014	Renate	1	(0)
Total		18	(0)

International career
2010–2011	Italy U-20	2	(0)
- * Club domestic league appearances and goals

Andrea Caroppo (born 18 July 1990) is an Italian footballer who plays as a goalkeeper.

== Career ==
Born in Lecce, Apulia, southern Italy, Caroppo started his career at the northern Italy club Brescia Calcio. Caroppo was the backup of Sergio Viotti in the reserve in the 2007–08 season; he also played for the reserve B in Berretti League. After Viotti left the club, Caroppo was the first choice of the reserve in the 2008–09 season. Caroppo left for Olbia in July 2009.

In January 2010 Caroppo left for the reserve of Palermo on a free loan, with option to co-own the player for €500,000. He played 9 games in half-season and all 3 games in the playoffs, ahead Francesco Di Gregorio. The club was eliminated in the quarter-finals in the playoffs round of the reserve league. At the end of season Caroppo returned to Brescia.

Caroppo left for Hellas Verona F.C. along with Marco Martina Rini and Fabrizio Paghera in July 2010. The Veneto club signed Caroppo in a co-ownership deal for a nominal fee of €250. Caroppo played for Verona in 2010–11 Coppa Italia Lega Pro. In June 2011 Caroppo returned to Brescia in 2-year contract for a peppercorn of €250.

Caroppo was the third keeper of the first team, behind Nicola Leali and Michele Arcari. Caroppo made his Serie B debut on 26 May 2012, substituting Arcari in the 54th minute. The club then conceded 4 goals. The team was beaten 1–4 by F.C. Crotone. In the 2012–13 season the coach preferred Alessio Cragno and Stefano Russo as the backups of Arcari.

In mid-2013 Caroppo was signed by Bellaria – Igea Marina. On 8 January 2014 he was signed by fellow fourth-tier club Renate.
