= 2012–13 Brescia Calcio season =

Brescia Calcio
2012–13 season
- Serie B: 6th
- Coppa Italia: Second Round
- Top goalscorer: Andrea Caracciolo (15)
- Highest home attendance: 8,000 (Round 42 vs. Varese)
- Lowest home attendance: 1,500 (Round 2 vs. Juve Stabia)

The 2012–13 Brescia Calcio season is the 84th season in club history.

== Matches ==
=== Legend ===
Win Draw Loss Postponed

=== Friendlies ===
17 January 2013	Brescia	7–1	Chiasso	Brescia
15:00		Report		Stadium: Stadio Mario Rigamonti

=== Serie B ===
Pos	Team	Pld	W	D	L	GF	GA	GD	Pts	Promotion or relegation
4	Empoli	42	20	13	9	69	51	+18	73	Qualification to promotion play-offs
5	Novara (Note: Novara was docked 3 points due to the 2011 Italian football scandal.)	42	19	10	13	73	46	+27	64	Qualification to promotion play-offs
6	Brescia	42	15	17	10	58	50	+8	62	Qualification to promotion play-offs
7	Varese (Note: Ascoli and Varese were docked 1 point due to the 2011 Italian football scandal.)	42	16	13	13	55	53	+2	60	
8	Modena (Note: Modena and Reggina were docked 2 points due to the 2011 Italian football scandal.)	42	15	12	15	52	51	+1	55	

Source: Serie B
Rules for classification: 1) points; 2) head-to-head points; 3) head-to-head goal difference; 4) head-to-head goals scored; 5) goal difference; 6) number of goals scored.
Notes:

25 August 2012 1	Crotone	1–0	Brescia	Brescia
20:45	Maiello 90+5'	Report		Stadium: Stadio Ezio Scida; Attendance: 1,554; Referee: Claudio Gavillucci

1 September 2012 2	Brescia	2–0	Juve Stabia	Brescia
20:45	Daprelà 69'; Zambelli 90'	Report		Stadium: Stadio Mario Rigamonti; Attendance: 1,500; Referee: Pierluigi Pairetto

9 September 2012 3	Spezia	3–1	Brescia	La Spezia
18:00	Sansovini 39', 87'; Di Gennaro 73' (pen.)	Report	Bouy 13'	Stadium: Stadio Alberto Picco; Attendance: 3,604; Referee: Angelo Cervellera

14 September 2012 4	Brescia	0–0	Padova	Brescia
20:45		Report		Stadium: Stadio Mario Rigamonti; Attendance: 5,000; Referee: Emilio Ostinelli

22 September 2012 5	Vicenza	2–2	Brescia	Vicenza
15:00	Malonga 45+3'; Gavazzi 79'	Report	Salamon 49'; Corvia 55'	Stadium: Stadio Romeo Menti; Attendance: 6,649; Referee: Massimiliano Irrati

25 September 2012 6	Brescia	2–1	Modena	Brescia
20:45	Caracciolo 52', 73' (pen.)	Report	Gozzi 58'	Stadium: Stadio Mario Rigamonti; Attendance: 5,000; Referee: Riccardo Pinzani

29 September 2012 7	Empoli	1–1	Brescia	Empoli
15:00	Maccarone 7'	Report	Lásik 18'	Stadium: Stadio Carlo Castellani; Attendance: 742; Referee: Maurizio Ciampi

6 October 2012 8	Brescia	2–0	Virtus Lanciano	Brescia
15:00	Budel 74'; Caracciolo 89'	Report		Stadium: Stadio Mario Rigamonti; Attendance: 4,500; Referee: Gianluca Manganiello

13 October 2012 9	Novara	4–2	Brescia	Novara
19:45	Mehmeti 30'; González 57'; Stovini 81' (o.g.); Baclet 90'	Report	Caracciolo 64', 82'	Stadium: Stadio Silvio Piola; Attendance: 4,708; Referee: Leonardo Baracani

22 October 2012 10	Bari	1–1	Brescia	Bari
19:45	Galano 44'	Report	Daprelà 15'	Stadium: Stadio San Nicola; Attendance: 7,463; Referee: Dino Tommasi

27 October 2012 11	Brescia	1–1	Pro Vercelli	Brescia
15:00	De Maio 57'	Report	Stovini 16' (o.g.)	Stadium: Stadio Mario Rigamonti; Attendance: 4,300; Referee: Francesco Castrignano

30 October 2012 12	Cittadella	1–1	Brescia	Cittadella
19:45	Di Roberto 28' (pen.)	Report	Salamon 81'	Stadium: Stadio Pier Cesare Tombolato; Attendance: 2,435; Referee: Federico La Penna

3 November 2012 13	Brescia	1–0	Ternana	Brescia
15:00	Saba 18'	Report		Stadium: Stadio Mario Rigamonti; Attendance: 4,200; Referee: Eugenio Abbattista

10 November 2012 14	Cesena	1–3	Brescia	Cesena
15:00	Defrel 22'	Report	Budel 35'; Corvia 45+1' (pen.); Saba 79'	Stadium: Stadio Dino Manuzzi; Attendance: 9,598; Referee: Francesco Borriello

18 November 2012 15	Brescia	1–1	Sassuolo	Brescia
12:30	Corvia 29'	Report	Boakye 26'	Stadium: Stadio Mario Rigamonti; Attendance: 6,000; Referee: Claudio Gavillucci

24 November 2012 16	Grosseto	2–2	Brescia	Grosseto
15:00	Sforzini 14'; Olivi 22'	Report	Caracciolo 2' (pen.); L. Scaglia 18'	Stadium: Stadio Olimpico Carlo Zecchini; Attendance: 2,148; Referee: Dino Tommasi

1 December 2012 17	Brescia	2–0	Hellas Verona	Brescia
15:00	Daprelà 45+1'; L. Scaglia 90+2'	Report		Stadium: Stadio Mario Rigamonti; Attendance: 7,500; Referee: Angelo Martino Giancola

8 December 2012 18	Brescia	2–2	Reggina	Brescia
15:00	Corvia 10', 18'	Report	Comi 45+3'; Barillà 82'	Stadium: Stadio Mario Rigamonti; Attendance: 3,000; Referee: Michael Fabbri

17 December 2012 19	Ascoli	2–0	Brescia	Ascoli Piceno
21:00	Fossati 56'; Feczesin 59'	Report		Stadium: Stadio Cino e Lillo Del Duca; Attendance: 2,260; Referee: Luigi Nasca

23 December 2012 20	Brescia	0–0	Livorno	Brescia
15:00		Report		Stadium: Stadio Mario Rigamonti; Attendance: 4,600; Referee: Leonardo Baracani

22 January 2013 21	Varese	3–2	Brescia	Varese
18:30	Troest 15'; Martinetti 85'; Oduamadi 87'	Report	Corvia 1'; Mitrović 25'	Stadium: Stadio Franco Ossola; Attendance: 3,275; Referee: Massimiliano Irrati

30 December 2012 22	Brescia	5–0	Crotone	Brescia
15:00	Salamon 35'; De Maio 66'; Mitrović 68'; Corvia 71'; Picci 75'	Report		Stadium: Stadio Mario Rigamonti; Attendance: 4,500; Referee: Eugenio Abbattista

28 January 2013 23	Juve Stabia	0–0	Brescia	Castellammare di Stabia
19:45		Report		Stadium: Stadio Romeo Menti; Attendance: 2,719; Referee: Angelo Martino Giancola

2 February 2013 24	Brescia	0–0	Spezia	Brescia
15:00		Report		Stadium: Stadio Mario Rigamonti; Attendance: 3,500; Referee: Gennaro Palazzino

9 February 2013 25	Padova	0–0	Brescia	Padua
15:00		Report		Stadium: Stadio Euganeo; Attendance: 5,209; Referee: Renzo Candussio

16 February 2013 26	Brescia	0–1	Vicenza	Brescia
15:00		Report	Brighenti 49'	Stadium: Stadio Mario Rigamonti; Attendance: 4,500; Referee: Luigi Nasca

6 March 2013 27	Modena	1–2	Brescia	Modena
18:30	Stanco 56'	Report	Budel 39'; Caracciolo 88'	Stadium: Stadio Alberto Braglia; Attendance: 3,744; Referee: Gianluca Manganiello

26 February 2013 28	Brescia	0–3	Empoli	Brescia
20:45		Report	Saponara 4'; Tavano 16', 46'	Stadium: Stadio Mario Rigamonti; Attendance: 3,500; Referee: Aleandro Di Paolo

2 March 2013 29	Virtus Lanciano	0–2	Brescia	Lanciano
15:00		Report	Corvia 74', 85'	Stadium: Stadio Guido Biondi; Attendance: 2,015; Referee: Massimiliano Irrati

9 March 2013 30	Brescia	1–1	Novara	Brescia
15:00	L. Scaglia 30'	Report	Seferovic 9'	Stadium: Stadio Mario Rigamonti; Attendance: 4,000; Referee: Dino Tommasi

16 March 2013 31	Brescia	1–1	Bari	Brescia
15:00	Corvia 54'	Report	Ghezzal 14'	Stadium: Stadio Mario Rigamonti; Attendance: 4,500; Referee: Riccardo Pinzani

19 March 2013 32	Pro Vercelli	2–3	Brescia	Vercelli
20:45	M. Scaglia 2'; Ragatzu 60'	Report	L. Scaglia 42'; Corvia 56', 65'	Stadium: Stadio Silvio Piola; Attendance: 1,972; Referee: Leonardo Baracani

24 March 2013 33	Brescia	2–2	Cittadella	Brescia
15:00	Gasparetto 37' (o.g.); Picci 90+2'	Report	Di Nardo 47', 90+3'	Stadium: Stadio Mario Rigamonti; Attendance: 5,000; Referee: Francesco Castrignano

28 March 2013 34	Ternana	1–0	Brescia	Terni
20:45	Vitale 72'	Report		Stadium: Stadio Libero Liberati; Attendance: 5,131; Referee: Luigi Nasca

6 April 2013 35	Brescia	2–1	Cesena	Brescia
15:00	Daprelà 69'; Caracciolo 82'	Report	Granoche 29'	Stadium: Stadio Mario Rigamonti; Attendance: 4,200; Referee: Fabrizio Pasqua

13 April 2013 36	Sassuolo	1–1	Brescia	Modena
15:00	Longhi 85'	Report	Corvia 45'	Stadium: Stadio Alberto Braglia; Attendance: 3,466; Referee: Gennaro Palazzino

16 April 2013 37	Brescia	3–1	Grosseto	Brescia
20:45	Caracciolo 45', 54'; L. Scaglia 51'	Report	Delvecchio 66' (pen.)	Stadium: Stadio Mario Rigamonti; Attendance: 5,500; Referee: Gianluca Manganiello

22 April 2013 38	Hellas Verona	4–2	Brescia	Verona
21:00	Jorginho 6'; Juanito 57'; Cacia 71', 88'	Report	Caracciolo 4', 11'	Stadium: Stadio Marc'Antonio Bentegodi; Attendance: 15,540; Referee: Maurizio Mariani

27 April 2013 39	Reggina	0–1	Brescia	Reggio Calabria
15:00		Report	De Maio 54'	Stadium: Stadio Oreste Granillo; Attendance: 3,412; Referee: Marco Di Bello

4 May 2013 40	Brescia	3–2	Ascoli	Brescia
15:00	Caracciolo 19', 58' (pen.), 82'	Report	De Maio 25' (o.g.); Feczesin 68' (pen.)	Stadium: Stadio Mario Rigamonti; Attendance: 4,400; Referee: Angelo Cervellera

10 May 2013 41	Livorno	3–0	Brescia	Livorno
20:45	Belingheri 11', 25'; Dionisi 58'	Report		Stadium: Stadio Armando Picchi; Attendance: 9,122; Referee: Renzo Candussio

18 May 2013 42	Brescia	2–0	Varese	Brescia
16:30	Zambelli 51'; Caracciolo 69'	Report		Stadium: Stadio Mario Rigamonti; Attendance: 8,000; Referee: Dino Tommasi

==== Promotion Playoffs ====
22 May 2013	Brescia	1–1	Livorno	Brescia
18:30	Caracciolo 36'	Report	Paulinho 51'	Stadium: Stadio Mario Rigamonti; Attendance: 10,581; Referee: Maurizio Ciampi

26 May 2013	Livorno	1–1 (2–2 agg.)	Brescia	Livorno
20:45	Dionisi 66'	Report	Corvia 56'	Stadium: Stadio Armando Picchi; Attendance: 9,122; Referee: Marco Di Bello

Livorno advanced due to better placing on ladder

=== Coppa Italia ===
Round 2	Brescia	1–2 (a.e.t.)	Cremonese	Brescia
20:30	Caracciolo 81'	Report	Fietta 30'; A. Filippini 99' (pen.)	Stadium: Stadio Mario Rigamonti; Attendance: 2,872; Referee: Gianluca Manganiello
