= Marko Mitrović =

Marko Mitrović may refer to:

- Marko Mitrović (footballer, born 1978), Serbian football coach and former player
- Marko Mitrović (footballer, born 1992), Swedish footballer
