= Samuel Obeng =

Samuel Obeng may refer to:

- Samuel Obeng (linguist) (born 1959), Ghanaian linguist
- Samuel Obeng (footballer) (born 1997), Ghanaian footballer
