= Paparusso =

Paparusso is a surname. Notable people with the surname include:

- Daniele Paparusso (born 1993), Italian footballer
- David Paparusso (born 1968), known professionally as David Vendetta, French musician
