= List of Italian football transfers summer 2013 (August) =

This is a list of Italian football transfers featuring at least one Serie A or Serie B club which were completed from 1 August to 2 September 2013, the date which the summer transfer window closed. Free agents could join any club at any time.

== August to 2 September 2013 ==
Legend

- Those clubs in Italic indicate that the player already left on loan in previous season or 2013 new signing that immediately left the club
- Non-EU transfer from and to abroad were marked yellow, excluding loan deal that turned definitive and renewed loans. Serie A clubs could only sign 2 non-EU players from abroad by certain criteria, such as replace departed non-EU player or the club completely did not have non-EU players.

Date	Name	Moving from	Moving to	Fee
1 August 2013	Francesco Bolzoni	Siena	Palermo	€1 million
1 August 2013	Gonzalo Mastriani	Parma	Crotone	Loan
1 August 2013	Emanuel Benito Rivas	Verona	Spezia	Undisclosed
1 August 2013	Nicolas Viola	Reggina (& Palermo, c)	Ternana (& Palermo, c)	Undisclosed (transfer of co-ownership)
1 August 2013	Diego Laxalt	Defensor Sporting (Uruguay)	Internazionale	Undisclosed
2 August 2013	Marco Armellino	Reggina	Cremonese	Loan
2 August 2013	Alejandro Gómez	Catania	Metalist (Ukraine)	Undisclosed
2 August 2013	Kevin Vinetot	Crotone (& Genoa, c)	Lecce	Loan
2 August 2013	Luca Zanotti	Atalanta	Entella	Loan
3 August 2013	Antonio Rosati	Napoli	Sassuolo	Loan
3 August 2013	Alain Baclet	Novara	Casertana	Loan
3 August 2013	Francesco Grandolfo	Bari	Savona	Loan
3 August 2013	Christian Esposito	Novara	Savona	Loan
4 August 2013	Luigi Vitale	Napoli	Juve Stabia	Loan
5 August 2013	Mikael Ishak	Köln (Germany)	Parma	Undisclosed
5 August 2013	Rocco Benci	Catania	Sorrento	Co-ownership
5 August 2013	Giuseppe Giovinco	Spezia	Pisa	Undisclosed
5 August 2013	Masahudu Alhassan	Udinese	Latina	Loan
5 August 2013	Hördur Magnússon	Juventus	Spezia	Co-ownership
5 August 2013	Elvis Kabashi	Juventus	Pescara	Loan
5 August 2013	Richard-Quentin Samnick	Paris Saint-Germain (France)	Bari	Undisclosed
5 August 2013	Amara Konaté (Ivory Coast)	Roma	Lleida Esportiu (Spain)	Loan
5 August 2013	Alessandro Sbaffo	Chievo	Reggina	Undisclosed
5 August 2013	Andrea Cocco	Verona	Reggina	Loan
5 August 2013	Nicolò Lolli	Cesena	San Marino	Loan
6 August 2013	Federico Rodríguez	Bologna	Montevideo Wanderers (Uruguay)	Loan
6 August 2013	Diego Falcinelli	Sassuolo	Lanciano	Loan
6 August 2013	Raffaele D'Orsi	Sassuolo	Giacomense	Loan
6 August 2013	Fabiano Santacroce	Parma	Padova	Loan
6 August 2013	Simone Ceccarelli	Verona	Paganese	Loan
6 August 2013	Francesco Nicastro	Catania	Rimini	Co-ownership
6 August 2013	Ameth Fall	Catania	Rimini	Loan
6 August 2013	Nikolay Mihaylov	Twente (Netherlands)	Hellas Verona	Undisclosed
7 August 2013	Granddi Ngoyi	Troyes (France)	Palermo	Undisclosed
7 August 2013	Agon Mehmeti	Palermo	Olhanense (Portugal)	Loan
7 August 2013	Danilo Cataldi	Lazio	Crotone	Loan
7 August 2013	Gianluca Musacci	Parma	Padova	Loan
7 August 2013	Vedran Celjak	Sampdoria	Padova	Loan
7 August 2013	Ignacio Fideleff	Napoli	Tigre (Argentina)	Loan
7 August 2013	Magnus Troest	Varese	Lanciano	Free
7 August 2013	Ambrogio Sorriso	Juve Stabia	Pro Patria (& Novara, c)	Undisclosed
8 August 2013	Mauricio Sperduti	Palermo	Arsenal (Argentina)	Free
8 August 2013	Gervinho (Ivory Coast)	Arsenal (England)	Roma	Undisclosed
8 August 2013	Amidu Salifu	Fiorentina	Modena	Loan
8 August 2013	Damiano Ferronetti	Genoa	Ternana	Free
8 August 2013	Kenneth Zohore	Fiorentina	Brøndby (Denmark)	Loan
8 August 2013	Valerio Di Cesare	Torino	Brescia	Undisclosed
8 August 2013	Mattia Cassani	Fiorentina	Parma	Loan
8 August 2013	Giuseppe Prestia	Parma	Crotone	Co-ownership
8 August 2013	Cristian Pasquato	Udinese (& Juventus, c)	Padova	Loan
8 August 2013	Filippo Boniperti	Parma (& Juventus, c)	Crotone	Loan
8 August 2013	Lorenzo Pasqualini	Ascoli (& Parma, c)	Crotone	Loan
8 August 2013	Enrico Guarna	Spezia	Bari	Undisclosed
8 August 2013	Martino Borghese	Bari	Spezia	Undisclosed
9 August 2013	Danilo Pereira	Parma	Marítimo (Portugal)	Free
9 August 2013	Egidio Arévalo (Uruguay)	Palermo	Chicago Fire (United States)	Loan
9 August 2013	Filipe Gomes	Siena	Perugia	Free
9 August 2013	Khouma Babacar	Fiorentina	Modena	Loan
9 August 2013	Tomas Danilevičius	Latina	Parma	Undisclosed
9 August 2013	Caio Secco	Vitória (Brazil)	Parma	Free
9 August 2013	Denis Maccan	Brescia	Pordenone	Free
10 August 2013	Nico Pulzetti	Bologna	Siena	Loan
10 August 2013	Leonardo Spinazzola	Juventus	Siena	Loan
10 August 2013	Guillermo Giacomazzi	Lecce	Siena	Free
10 August 2013	Rolando	Porto (Portugal)	Internazionale	Loan
10 August 2013	Vincenzo Nitride	Torino	Bra	Co-ownership
10 August 2013	Alessandro Favalli	Parma (& Cremonese, c)	Gorica (Slovenia)	Loan
10 August 2013	Oscar Branzani	Cittadella	Barletta	Co-ownership, Undisclosed
10 August 2013	Alessandro De Leidi	Barletta	Cittadella	Co-ownership, Undisclosed
12 August 2013	Tomas Švedkauskas	Roma (youth)	Paganese	Loan
12 August 2013	Boris Grodzic	Hajduk Kula (Serbia)	Palermo	Loan
12 August 2013	Edoardo Goldaniga	Palermo	Pisa	Loan
12 August 2013	Roger Miller Rojas	Palermo	Chiasso (Switzerland)	Loan
12 August 2013	Alex Valentini	Pro Vercelli	Spezia	Co-ownership
12 August 2013	Danilo Russo	Spezia	Pro Vercelli	Co-ownership
12 August 2013	Andrea Cristiano	Pro Vercelli	Varese	Free
13 August 2013	Pasquale Turi	Siena	Chieti	Loan
13 August 2013	Matěj Vydra	Udinese	W.B.A. (England)	Loan
13 August 2013	Tomas Danilevičius	Parma	Gorica (Slovenia)	Loan
13 August 2013	Wallace (Brazil)	Chelsea (England)	Internazionale	Loan
13 August 2013	Gino Peruzzi	Vélez (Argentina)	Catania	Undisclosed
13 August 2013	Massimiliano Benassi	Lecce	Reggina	Loan
13 August 2013	Fabrizio Melara	Reggina	Lecce	Undisclosed
13 August 2013	Diego Farias	Chievo	Sassuolo	Loan
13 August 2013	Matteo Abbate	Verona	Cremonese	Undisclosed
14 August 2013	Rômulo	Fiorentina	Verona	Loan
14 August 2013	Claiton	Bari	Chievo	Undisclosed
14 August 2013	Marco Calderoni	Grosseto	Bari (& Chievo, c)	Undisclosed
15 August 2013	Kadir Caidi	Bologna	Bellaria	Loan
15 August 2013	Lorenzo Lollo	Spezia	Carpi	Loan
16 August 2013	Marco Ferrara	Internazionale	Pergolettese	Co-ownership
16 August 2013	Andreas Granqvist	Genoa	Krasnodar (Russia)	Undisclosed
17 August 2013	Sergio Romero	Sampdoria	AS Monaco (France)	Loan
18 August 2013	Pablo Osvaldo	Roma	Southampton (England)	€15,1M
19 August 2013	Marek Čech	Trabzonspor (Turkey)	Bologna	Free
19 August 2013	Kingsley Boateng	Milan	Catania	Loan
19 August 2013	Nicola Rigoni	Chievo	Reggina	Loan
19 August 2013	Marco Chiosa	Torino	Bari	Loan
20 August 2013	Stefano Morrone	Parma	Latina	Loan
20 August 2013	Alfred Duncan	Internazionale	Livorno	Loan
20 August 2013	Ibrahima Mbaye	Internazionale	Livorno	Loan
20 August 2013	Samuele Longo	Internazionale	Verona	Loan
20 August 2013	Saphir Taïder	Bologna	Internazionale	Co-ownership
20 August 2013	Sacha Cori	Cesena	Venezia	Loan
20 August 2013	Diego Laxalt	Internazionale	Bologna	Loan
21 August 2013	Mikael Ishak	Parma	Crotone	Loan
21 August 2013	Felipe Avenatti	River Plate (Uruguay)	Ternana	Undisclosed
21 August 2013	Cesare Rickler	Bologna	Mantova	Loan
21 August 2013	Rodney Strasser (Sierra Leone)	Genoa	Reggina	Loan
22 August 2013	Raman Chibsah (Ghana)	Parma	Sassuolo	Co-ownership, €2.5M (Note: The player already played for his new club in 2012–13 season, the deal turned from temporary to definitive.)
22 August 2013	Achille Coser	Vicenza	Cesena	Loan
22 August 2013	Nicola Ravaglia	Cesena	Vicenza	Loan
22 August 2013	Alessandro Gamberini	Napoli	Genoa	Loan
22 August 2013	Elia Cortesi	Atalanta	Bassano	Loan
24 August 2013	Caio Secco	Parma	Crotone	Co-ownership, €250
24 August 2013	Matuzalém	Lazio	Genoa	Undisclosed
24 August 2013	Vincenzo Pepe	Lanciano	Pro Vercelli	Undisclosed
24 August 2013	Umberto Germano	Pro Vercelli	Lanciano	Loan
24 August 2013	Róbert Feczesin	Ascoli	Padova	Free
26 August 2013	Emmanuel Cascione	Parma	Cesena	Loan
26 August 2013	Gabriel Appelt	Juventus	Spezia	Loan
26 August 2013	Matteo Legittimo	Lecce	Parma	Undisclosed
27 August 2013	Attila Filkor	Milan	Châteauroux (France)	Loan
27 August 2013	Abdou Doumbia	Parma	Lecce	Loan
26 August 2013	Martí Riverola	Bologna	Mallorca (Spain)	Loan
26 August 2013	Duván Zapata (Colombia)	Estudiantes (Argentina)	Napoli	Undisclosed
27 August 2013	Odion Ighalo	Udinese	Granada (Spain)	Loan
27 August 2013	Innocent Emeghara	Siena	Livorno	Loan
27 August 2013	Luca Maniero	Padova	Internazionale	Loan
27 August 2013	Armando Perna	Modena	Padova	Free
27 August 2013	Vito Di Bari	Reggina	Venezia	Undisclosed
28 August 2013	Adem Ljajić	Fiorentina	Roma	€11M
28 August 2013	Erik Lamela	Roma	Tottenham (England)	€30M
28 August 2013	Jonny Mosquera (Colombia)	Envigado (Colombia)	Livorno	Loan
28 August 2013	Ante Rebić	RNK Split (Croatia)	Fiorentina	Undisclosed
28 August 2013	Christian Jidayi	Novara	Forlì	Loan
28 August 2013	Daniele Capelli	Atalanta	Cesena	Loan
28 August 2013	Richmond Boakye	Juventus (& Genoa, c)	Elche (Spain)	Loan
28 August 2013	Giuseppe Figliomeni	Juve Stabia	Latina (& Parma, c)	Undisclosed
28 August 2013	Wojciech Pawłowski	Udinese	Latina	Loan
28 August 2013	Fausto Rossi	Juventus	Valladolid (Spain)	Loan
29 August 2013	Marco Biagianti	Catania	Livorno	Undisclosed
29 August 2013	Ezequiel Schelotto	Internazionale	Sassuolo	Loan
29 August 2013	Maurizio Lanzaro	Zaragoza (Spain)	Juve Stabia	Free
29 August 2013	Luca Martinelli	Juve Stabia	Chievo	Co-ownership
29 August 2013	Luca Martinelli	Chievo	Juve Stabia	Loan
29 August 2013	Yves Baraye	Lumezzane	Juve Stabia (& Chievo, c)	Undisclosed
29 August 2013	Marcelo Estigarribia	Deportivo Maldonado (Uruguay)	Chievo	Loan
29 August 2013	Mathieu Flamini	Milan	Arsenal (England)	Free
29 August 2013	Gadji Tallo	Roma	Ajaccio (France)	Loan
29 August 2013	Mounir El Hamdaoui	Fiorentina	Málaga (Spain)	Loan
29 August 2013	Kris Jogan	Verona	Nocerina	Loan
29 August 2013	Andrea Mantovani	Palermo	Bologna	Loan
29 August 2013	Abdelkader Ghezzal	Bari	Parma	Undisclosed
29 August 2013	Alessandro Cresenzi	Roma	Ajaccio (France)	Loan
29 August 2013	Maks Barišic	Catania	Milan	Loan
29 August 2013	Abdelkader Ghezzal	Parma	Latina	Loan
29 August 2013	Jonathas	Pescara	Latina	Undisclosed
30 August 2013	Salvatore Bruno	Juve Stabia	Modena	Undisclosed
30 August 2013	Alessandro Potenza	Catania	Modena	Free
30 August 2013	Leandro Rinaudo	Napoli	Livorno	Free
30 August 2013	Giovanni Zaro	Internazionale	Castiglione	Co-ownership
30 August 2013	Zsolt Laczkó	Sampdoria	Padova	Loan
30 August 2013	Kevin-Prince Boateng	Milan	Schalke 04 (Germany)	Undisclosed
30 August 2013	César Falletti	Cerro Porteño (Paraguay)	Ternana	Undisclosed
30 August 2013	João da Silva	Levski Sofia (Bulgaria)	Bari	Undisclosed
31 August 2013	Salvatore Burrai	Latina	Modena	Undisclosed
31 August 2013	Alessandro Matri	Juventus	Milan	€11M
31 August 2013	Mory Koné	Le Mans (France)	Parma	Undisclosed
31 August 2013	Andrea Coda	Udinese	Livorno	Loan
31 August 2013	Giovanni Pasquale	Udinese	Torino	Loan
31 August 2013	Rafael Marques (Brazil)	Atlético Mineiro (Brazil)	Verona	Undisclosed
31 August 2013	Luca Antonini	Milan	Genoa	Undisclosed (Swap with Birsa)
31 August 2013	Valter Birsa	Genoa	Milan	Undisclosed (Swap with Antonini)
31 August 2013	Ivan Castiglia	Reggina	Vicenza	Loan
1 September 2013	Walter Gargano	Napoli	Parma	Loan
1 September 2013	Santiago García	Palermo	Werder Bremen (Germany)	Loan
1 September 2013	Jonathan Cristaldo	Metalist (Ukraine)	Bologna	Loan
2 September 2013	Matteo Contini	Atalanta	Juve Stabia	Loan
2 September 2013	Matteo Scozzarella	Atalanta	Juve Stabia	Loan
2 September 2013	Alex Calderoni	Padova	Juve Stabia	Free
2 September 2013	Kaká	Real Madrid (Spain)	Milan	Undisclosed
2 September 2013	Mathías Abero	Bologna	Avellino	Loan
2 September 2013	Paulin Damo	Udinese	Avellino	Free
2 September 2013	Jerry Mbakogu (Nigeria)	Padova	Carpi	Loan
2 September 2013	Roberto Inglese	Chievo	Carpi	Loan
2 September 2013	Filippo Porcari	Spezia	Carpi	Free
2 September 2013	Luca Marrone	Juventus	Sassuolo	€4,5M(Co-ownership)
2 September 2013	Domenico Berardi	Sassuolo	Juventus	€4,5M(Co-ownership)
2 September 2013	Domenico Berardi	Juventus	Sassuolo	Loan
2 September 2013	Jorge Martínez	Juventus	Novara	Loan
2 September 2013	Luca Tomasig	Reggiana	Novara	Undisclosed
2 September 2013	Alberto Libertazzi	Novara (& Juventus, c )	Pro Vercelli	Loan
2 September 2013	Alberto Libertazzi	Pro Vercelli	Spezia	Undisclosed
2 September 2013	Pietro Iemmello	Spezia	Novara	Loan
2 September 2013	Filippo Fondi	Chievo	Bassano	Loan
2 September 2013	Daniel Kofi Agyei (Ghana)	Fiorentina	Benevento	Co-ownership
2 September 2013	Luca Anania	Padova	Livorno	Undisclosed
2 September 2013	Luca Mazzoni	Livorno	Padova	Loan
2 September 2013	Tomasz Kupisz	Jagiellonia (Poland)	Chievo	Undisclosed
2 September 2013	Jaroslav Plašil	Bordeaux (France)	Catania	Loan
2 September 2013	Andrea Petagna	Milan	Sampdoria	Loan
2 September 2013	Birkir Bjarnason	Pescara	Sampdoria	Co-ownership
2 September 2013	Joel Obi	Internazionale	Parma	Loan
2 September 2013	Daniele Paparusso	Poggibonsi	Ternana	Loan
2 September 2013	Mbaye Diagne	Juventus	Ajaccio (France)	Loan
2 September 2013	Andrea Rispoli	Parma	Ternana	Loan
2 September 2013	Marcel Büchel	Juventus	Lanciano	Loan
2 September 2013	Souleymane Doukara	Catania	Juve Stabia	Loan
2 September 2013	Matteo Gentili	Atalanta	Reggina	Co-ownership
2 September 2013	Matteo Rubin	Siena	Verona	Loan
2 September 2013	Gaël Genevier	Siena	Novara	Loan
2 September 2013	Gianluca Pegolo	Siena	Sassuolo	Undisclosed
2 September 2013	Raffaele Pucino	Varese (& Chievo, c)	Sassuolo (& Chievo, c)	Undisclosed (transfer of co-ownership)
2 September 2013	Zouhair Feddal	Parma	Siena	Loan
2 September 2013	Lorenzo Laverone	Sassuolo	Varese	Free
2 September 2013	Tommaso Bianchi	Sassuolo	Modena	Loan
2 September 2013	Leonardo Pavoletti	Sassuolo	Varese	Loan
2 September 2013	Alessandro Bernardini	Livorno	Verona	Loan
2 September 2013	Emanuele Calaiò	Napoli	Genoa	Loan
2 September 2013	Federico Casarini	Bologna	Lanciano	Loan
2 September 2013	Adrian Stoian	Chievo (& Roma, c)	Genoa	Loan
2 September 2013	Albano Bizzarri	Lazio	Genoa	Undisclosed
2 September 2013	Antonio Rozzi	Lazio	Real Madrid Castilla (Spain)	Loan
2 September 2013	Aurimas Vilkaitis	Lazio	Nocerina	Loan
2 September 2013	Tommaso Ceccarelli	Lazio	FeralpiSalò	Co-ownership
2 September 2013	Seyi Adeleke	Lazio	Biel (Switzerland)	Loan
2 September 2013	Riccardo Perpetuini	Lazio	Salernitana	Loan
2 September 2013	Antonino Barillà	Reggina	Sampdoria	Loan
2 September 2013	Matteo Ardemagni	Atalanta	Chievo	Loan
2 September 2013	Juan Antonio	Sampdoria	Brescia	Loan
2 September 2013	Antonio Floro Flores	Genoa	Sassuolo	Loan
2 September 2013	Felipe Seymour	Genoa	Spezia	Loan
2 September 2013	Diego Polenta	Genoa	Bari	Loan
2 September 2013	Daniel Jara Martínez	Genoa	Nocerina	Loan
2 September 2013	Ioannis Fetfatzidis	Olympiacos (Greece)	Genoa	Undisclosed
2 September 2013	Juan Iturbe	Porto (Portugal)	Verona	Loan
2 September 2013	Agim Ibraimi	Maribor (Slovenia)	Cagliari	Loan
2 September 2013	Pablo Cepellini	Cagliari	Maribor (Slovenia)	Loan
2 September 2013	Tommaso Berni	Sampdoria	Torino	Free
2 September 2013	Niccolò Galli	Padova	Cesena	Loan
2 September 2013	Luca Ceccarelli	Cesena	Padova	Loan
2 September 2013	Thiago Cionek	Padova	Modena	Loan
2 September 2013	Filippo Carini	Modena	Padova	Loan
2 September 2013	Alberto Barison	Padova	Perugia	Loan
2 September 2013	Marco Donadel	Napoli	Verona	Loan
2 September 2013	Adrián Centurión	Racing (Argentina)	Genoa	Loan
2 September 2013	Libor Kozák	Lazio	Aston Villa (England)	Undisclosed
2 September 2013	Etrit Berisha	Kalmar (Sweden)	Lazio	Undisclosed
2 September 2013	Brayan Perea (Colombia)	Deportivo Cali (Colombia)	Lazio	Undisclosed
2 September 2013	Douglas Santos	Granada (Spain)	Udinese	Loan
2 September 2013	Alex Geijo	Udinese	Mallorca (Spain)	Loan
2 September 2013	Gabriel Torje	Udinese	Espanyol (Spain)	Loan
2 September 2013	Abdoulwhaid Sissoko	Udinese	Hércules (Spain)	Loan
2 September 2013	Novothny Novothny	Napoli	Paganese	Loan
2 September 2013	Andrea Dossena	Napoli	Sunderland (England)	Undisclosed
2 September 2013	Andrea Belotti	AlbinoLeffe	Palermo	Loan
2 September 2013	Valerio Verre	Udinese (& Roma, c)	Palermo	Loan
2 September 2013	Emiliano Viviano	Palermo	Arsenal (England)	Loan
2 September 2013	Andrea Gessa	Cesena	Frosinone	Free
2 September 2013	Alessandro Vinci	Juve Stabia	Vicenza	Undisclosed
2 September 2013	Marco Cellini	Juve Stabia	Carrarese	Undisclosed
2 September 2013	Davide Sinigaglia	Ternana	Monza	Free
2 September 2013	Luca Castiglia	Juventus	Empoli	Loan
2 September 2013	Stefano Dicuonzo	Juve Stabia	Grosseto	Free
2 September 2013	Francesco Bombagi	Reggina	Grosseto	Loan
2 September 2013	Lorenzo Burzigotti	Reggina	Grosseto	Loan
2 September 2013	Valerio Foglio	Grosseto	Reggina	Undisclosed
2 September 2013	Adriano Montalto	Latina	Grosseto	Undisclosed
2 September 2013	Marco Crimi	Grosseto	Latina	Loan
2 September 2013	Paolo Grossi	Verona (& Siena, c)	Brescia	Loan
2 September 2013	Renato Dossena	Empoli	Venezia	Free
2 September 2013	Matteo D'Alessandro	Reggina	Cuneo	Undisclosed
2 September 2013	Louise Essengue Parfait	Cesena	Lecce	Loan
2 September 2013	Luca Ceppitelli	Bari	Parma (remains at Bari, t)	Co-ownership, €500,000 (swap with Sall)

== Out of window transfers ==
Date	Name	Moving from	Moving to	Fee
9 September 2013	Vincenzo Sarno	Reggina	Virtus Entella	Free
8 October 2013	Gianluigi Bianco	Avellino	Castel Rigone	Free
