= Scappi =

Scappi is an Italian surname. Notable people with the surname include:

- Bartolomeo Scappi (c. 1500–1577), Italian chef and writer
- Caterina Scappi (died 1643), Italian born Maltese benefactress
- Federico Scappi (born 1994), Italian footballer
