= Antonio Di Nardo =

Antonio Di Nardo may refer to:

- Antonio Di Nardo (footballer, born 1979), Italian football forward
- Antonio Di Nardo (footballer, born 1998), Italian football forward
