= Nicola Leali =

Italian footballer (born 1993)

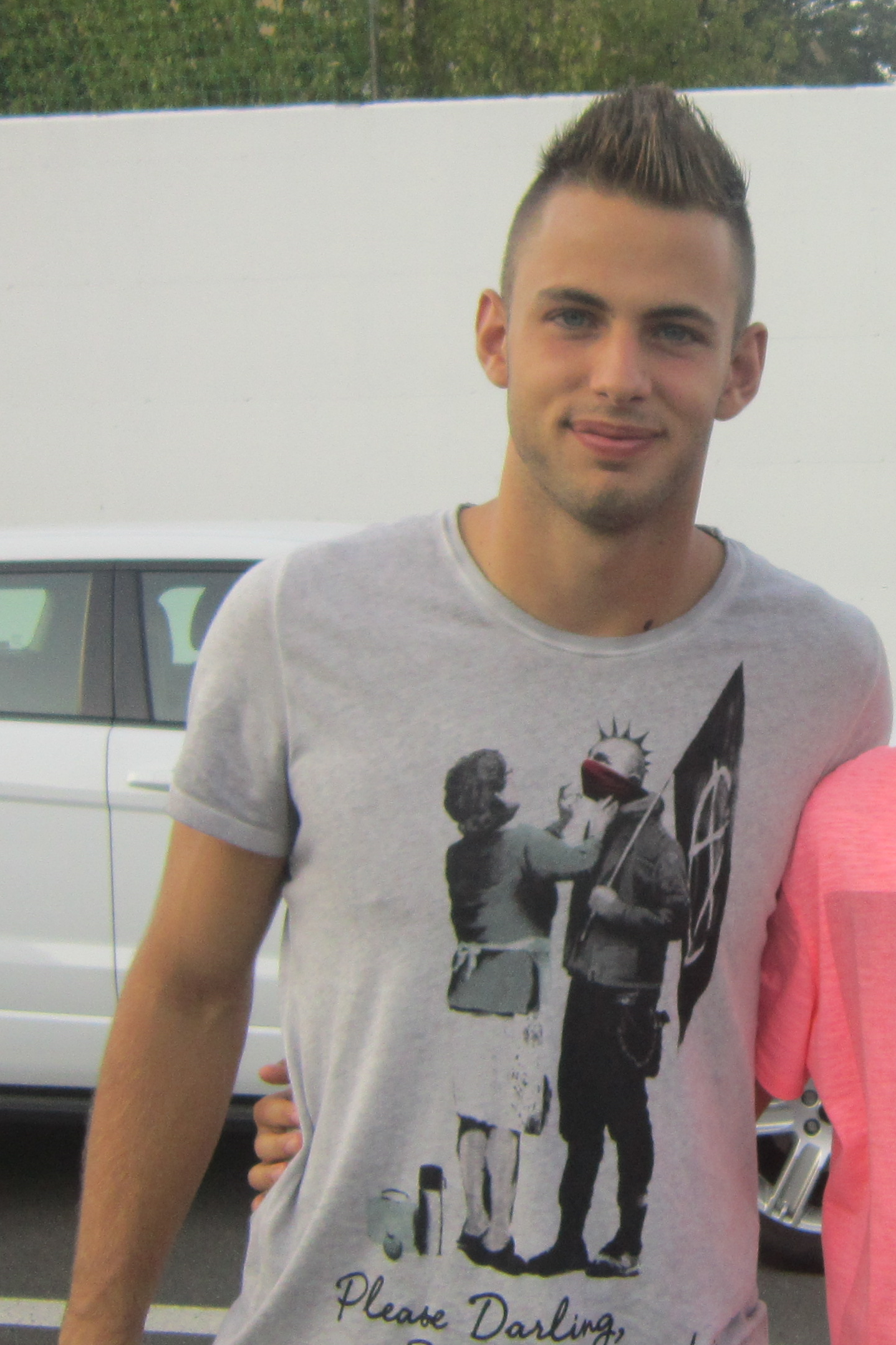

Personal information
- Date of birth: 17 February 1993 (age 33)
- Place of birth: Castiglione delle Stiviere, Italy
- Height: 1.94 m (6 ft 4 in)
- Position: Goalkeeper

Team information
- Current team: Hellas Verona
- Number: 1

Youth career
- Brescia

Senior career*
Years	Team	Apps	(Gls)
2010–2012	Brescia	19	(0)
2012–2018	Juventus	0	(0)
2012–2013	→ Virtus Lanciano (loan)	37	(0)
2013–2014	→ Spezia (loan)	42	(0)
2014–2015	→ Cesena (loan)	29	(0)
2015–2016	→ Frosinone (loan)	34	(0)
2016–2017	→ Olympiacos (loan)	13	(0)
2017–2018	→ Zulte Waregem (loan)	6	(0)
2018	→ Perugia (loan)	19	(0)
2018–2021	Perugia	0	(0)
2019	→ Foggia (loan)	16	(0)
2019–2021	→ Ascoli (loan)	70	(0)
2021–2023	Ascoli	37	(0)
2023–2026	Genoa	54	(0)
2026–	Hellas Verona	1	(0)

International career^{‡}
2008–2009	Italy U16	6	(0)
2009	Italy U17	3	(0)
2010–2011	Italy U18	2	(0)
2010–2012	Italy U19	12	(0)
2012–2013	Italy U20	4	(0)
2013–2015	Italy U21	1	(0)
- * Club domestic league appearances and goals as of 23 August 2026 ‡ National team caps and goals as of 1 July 2014

Nicola Leali (born 17 February 1993) is an Italian professional footballer who plays as a goalkeeper for Serie B club Hellas Verona.

== Club career ==
=== Brescia ===
Born in Castiglione delle Stiviere, Italy, Leali began his youth career with Brescia Calcio and played for the Brescia Primavera from 2009 to 2011. During the 2009–10 Serie B season, Sergio Viotti trained with first team instead and did not play for the reserve, but in the 2010–11 season, it was Leali who earned promotion to the first team. Michal Hrivňák was the first choice of the reserve (12 games) while Leali played 9 games.

He also began his professional career with Brescia, after being called up to the first team for the first time in 2010. Initially, Leali was the club's third-choice goalkeeper for the 2010–11 Serie A season, behind veterans Matteo Sereni, and Michele Arcari, and was called up to the bench 17 times following an injury to Sereni, who terminated his contract with Brescia after failing to regain his place in the team following his return from injury. Leali made his Serie A debut for the club on 15 May 2011 in a 1–0 loss versus Cesena. He officially was promoted to the first team in July 2011, ahead of the 2011–12 Serie B campaign after the club's relegation from Serie A in 2011. He began the new season as the club's first choice goalkeeper, ahead of the aforementioned Arcari and fellow Brescia youth product Andrea Caroppo, although he eventually lost his place. In the second half of season Michele Arcari became the first choice after Leali was heavily linked with a transfer to other Italian teams.

=== Juventus and loans ===
In June 2012 Leali traveled to Turin to have a medical in Clinica Fornaca di Sessant and the Istituto di Medicina dello Sport in order to formalize a possible transfer to Juventus. The deal was officially completed on 3 July 2012, for a fee of €3.8 million. He spent 6 seasons with the Old Lady, but mostly on loan to other clubs.

On 30 August 2012, Leali was sent out on loan to Serie B side, Lanciano on a one-year loan agreement. During his loan stint at the second-tier club, Leali appeared in 37 league matches. Leali returned to Juventus on 30 June 2013.

Upon his Juventus return, he was once again loaned out, to Serie B side Spezia Calcio on 30 July 2013. He joined the second-tier outfit on a one-season loan deal with an option to purchase half of the player's contract at the conclusion of the 2013–14 Serie B season. He made his debut for Spezia on 25 August 2013 in a 0–0 home draw against Cittadella, and finished the season with 39 league appearances. He returned to Juventus on 30 June 2014 upon the expiration of the loan agreement.

On 7 July 2014, Leali officially joined newly promoted Serie A side Cesena on a season-long loan deal that expired on 30 June 2015. Leali also signed a new 5-year contract with Juve in 2014.

On 13 July 2015, Leali officially joined newly promoted Serie A side Frosinone on a season-long loan deal that expires on 30 June 2016. Leali was the first choice, ahead Francesco Bardi.

On 7 July 2016, Leali officially joined 2016–17 season, Super League Olympiacos on a season-long loan deal that expires on 30 June 2017, with a reported €3 million buying clause at the end of the season. Οn 22 September 2016, according to Sergio Battistini manager of the Olympiakos goalie, has been decided that Leali will play in the UEFA games, as well as the Greek Cup, and Greek Stefanos Kapino will be Paulo Bento's first choice for the League.

On 9 and 16 March 2017, Leali was the starting goalkeeper in both UEFA Europa League last 16 legs against Besiktas, but was largely held responsible for his team's elimination due to at least three serious goalkeeping errors, one in the home game and two on the road; the respective matches ended 1–1 and 4–1 to the Turkish side.

On 27 July 2017, Leali was loaned to Zulte Waregem. He left the club in January having made six appearances in the national league and two in the UEFA Europa League.

=== Perugia ===
On 26 January 2018, Leali joined Serie B side Perugia on loan for the remainder of the season, with an obligation to sign Leali at the end of season for €2.5 million transfer fee. He signed a contract which would last until 30 June 2021.

On 29 January 2019, Leali joined to Foggia on loan until 30 June 2019.

=== Ascoli ===
On 2 September 2019, he was loaned to Ascoli until 30 June 2021. At the same time, fellow goalkeeper Andrea Fulignati moved to Perugia in a same formula.

On 31 March 2021, he signed a new contract with Ascoli until 30 June 2023.

=== Genoa ===
On 5 July 2023, Leali joined newly promoted Serie A team Genoa on a free transfer on a three-year deal.

During the 2024–25 season, Leali established himself as Genoa's first choice goalkeeper, following the injury of Pierluigi Gollini.

== International career ==
Leali has represented Italy at the U-17, U-18, U-19, U-20, and U-21 levels. He also notably represented Italy at the 2013 UEFA European Under-21 Football Championship in Israel.

== Career statistics ==
As of match played 25 May 2026

Appearances and goals by club, season and competition
Club	Season	League			National cup		Europe		Other		Total	
Club	Season	Division	Apps	Goals	Apps	Goals	Apps	Goals	Apps	Goals	Apps	Goals
Brescia	2010–11	Serie A	1	0	0	0	—		—		1	0
Brescia	2011–12	Serie B	16	0	2	0	—		—		18	0
Brescia	Total		17	0	2	0	—		—		19	0
Juventus	2012–13	Serie B	0	0	0	0	—		0	0	0	0
Virtus Lanciano (loan)	2012–13	Serie B	37	0	0	0	—		—		37	0
Spezia (loan)	2013–14	Serie B	38	0	3	0	—		1	0	42	0
Cesena (loan)	2014–15	Serie A	28	0	1	0	—		—		29	0
Frosinone (loan)	2015–16	Serie A	33	0	1	0	—		—		34	0
Olympiacos (loan)	2016–17	Super League Greece	13	0	4	0	10	0	—		27	0
Zulte Waregem (loan)	2017–18	Belgian First Division A	6	0	0	0	2	0	—		8	0
Perugia (loan)	2017–18	Serie B	19	0	—		—		1	0	20	0
Perugia	2018–19	Serie B	0	0	1	0	—		—		1	0
Perugia	2019–20	Serie B	0	0	0	0	—		—		0	0
Perugia	Perugia total		19	0	1	0	—		1	0	21	0
Foggia (loan)	2018–19	Serie B	16	0	—		—		—		16	0
Ascoli (loan)	2019–20	Serie B	35	0	0	0	—		—		35	0
Ascoli (loan)	2020–21	Serie B	35	0	0	0	—		—		35	0
Ascoli	2021–22	Serie B	36	0	1	0	—		1	0	38	0
Ascoli	2022–23	Serie B	25	0	1	0	—		—		26	0
Ascoli	Ascoli total		131	0	2	0	—		1	0	134	0
Genoa	2023–24	Serie A	3	0	3	0	—		—		6	0
Genoa	2024–25	Serie A	29	0	2	0	—		—		31	0
Genoa	2025–26	Serie A	22	0	2	0	—		—		24	0
Genoa	Total		54	0	7	0	—		—		61	0
Hellas Verona	2026–27	Serie A	0	0	0	0	—		—		0	0
Career total			396	0	21	0	12	0	3	0	432	0
