= Matteo Solini =

Italian footballer (born 1993)

Personal information
- Date of birth: 9 March 1993 (age 33)
- Place of birth: Bussolengo, Italy
- Height: 1.86 m (6 ft 1 in)
- Position: Defender

Team information
- Current team: Ravenna
- Number: 5

Youth career
- –2012: Chievo
- 2009–2010: → Internazionale (loan)

Senior career*
Years	Team	Apps	(Gls)
2012–2019	Chievo	0	(0)
2012–2013	→ Castiglione (loan)	28	(1)
2013–2014	→ Reggiana (loan)	20	(1)
2014–2015	→ Real Vicenza (loan)	10	(0)
2015–2016	→ Renate (loan)	3	(0)
2016–2017	→ Arezzo (loan)	0	(0)
2017	→ Carpi (loan)	0	(0)
2017	→ Modena (loan)	3	(0)
2018	→ Robur Siena (loan)	4	(0)
2018–2019	→ Reggina (loan)	33	(2)
2019–2024	Como	86	(3)
2024–2025	Mantova	21	(2)
2025–	Ravenna	29	(3)

International career
2008–2009	Italy U16	8	(0)
2009	Italy U17	4	(0)
2010–2011	Italy U18	3	(0)
- * Club domestic league appearances and goals as of 30 April 2026

Matteo Solini (born 9 March 1993) is an Italian footballer who plays as a defender for Serie C Group B club Ravenna.

== Career ==
=== Youth career ===
Born in Bussolengo, the province of Verona, Veneto region, Solini started his career at Verona club Chievo. In August 2009 Lombard club and defending Serie A champion of that year, Internazionale, signed Solini in co-ownership deal for €300,000. Solini suppressed the seasonal transfer record of U17 team, which Inter paid €220,000 for Manuel Canini on 23 July. However, Solini only played 1 season for Inter U17 team and Canini only half. Solini was a member for Italy U17 team in 2010 UEFA European Under-17 Football Championship qualification, which eliminated in October 2009. Since August 2010 Solini returned to Chievo for its reserve. In June 2012, Inter finally gave up the 50% registration rights back of Solini and Canini to Chievo and Cesena respectively as well as Chievo gave up the remain 50% registration rights of Enrico Alfonso to Inter. However, for accounting purpose, half of the card of Alfonso and Solini were both priced for €1.1 million. (Note: On the balance sheet of Chievo on 30 June 2011, it already had the asset value of another 50% card of Alfonso and Solini priced €1.9 million and €300,000 respectively. If both players sold for peppercorn fee, it would have made Chievo have negative asset (negative equity) on 30 June 2012 due to the immediate write-down of €2.2 million for the "co-ownership asset". However if Alfonso went to Inter outright for another €1.1 million, it just made Chievo have to book a financial cost of €800,000; co-currently, the signing of Solini for €2.2 million, would only create cost after 2011–12 financial year, as a amortization of intangible asset €733,333 each to 2012–13, 2013–14 and 2014–15 season, if a 3-year contract was signed. Moreover, as Chievo had retained half, Chievo just need to pay €1.1 million (thus counter-weight the selling of Alfonso's card directly) and would register a financial income of €800,000 as the retained half had increased value from €0.3 million to €1.1 million, yet counter-weight the aforementioned financial cost. It de facto turned the €2.2 million "co-ownership asset" into the contract value of Solini of €2.2 million as "intangible asset", delaying the write-down to amortization. Chievo may have received a speculative profit if Solini had developed into a Serie A player that matched the €2.2 million price tag.)

=== Serie C loans ===
Solini signed his first professional contract for Chievo in summer 2012. The first club since graduated from the reserve team was Castiglione. He was regularly in the starting line-up for the Lombard team in Italian fourth division. On 10 July 2013 Solini and Chievo team-mate Valerio Anastasi were signed by Reggiana in temporary deal and co-ownership deal respectively . Chievo also signed Federico Scappi as part of the swap deal. In 2014–1015, moved on loan to Real Vicenza that plays in Lega Pro.

On 7 July 2015 he moved to Renate along with Simone Moschin.

One year later he moved to Arezzo with Kevin Yamga

=== Como ===
On 15 July 2019, he signed a 2-year contract with Serie C club Como.

=== Mantova ===
On 4 July 2024, Solini joined Mantova in Serie B on a two-year contract.
