= Michele Arcari =

Italian footballer

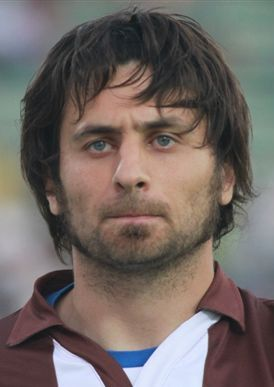

Personal information
- Date of birth: 27 June 1978 (age 48)
- Place of birth: Annicco, Italy
- Position: Goalkeeper

Team information
- Current team: Brescia (youth coach)

Senior career*
Years	Team	Apps	(Gls)
1997–1998	Cremonese	37	(0)
1997–1998	→ Fidenza (loan)	30	(0)
2000–2002	Lecco	43	(0)
2002–2005	Pizzighettone	95	(0)
2005–2006	Pro Patria	17	(0)
2006–2017	Brescia	206	(0)
2006–2007	→ Pro Patria (loan)	26	(0)
Total		454	(0)

Managerial career
- 2017–: Brescia (youth)
- * Club domestic league appearances and goals

Michele Arcari (born 27 June 1978 in Annicco) is a retired Italian association football goalkeeper. He is currently working as a youth coach at Brescia.

== Career statistics ==
Appearances and goals by club, season and competition
Club	Season	League			National cup		Other		Total	
Club	Season	Division	Apps	Goals	Apps	Goals	Apps	Goals	Apps	Goals
Cremonese	1998–99	Serie B	11	0	0	0	—		11	0
Cremonese	1999–2000	Serie C1	23	0	4	0	—		27	0
Cremonese	2000–01	Serie C2	3	0	0	0	—		3	0
Cremonese	Total		37	0	4	0	—		41	0
Fidenza (loan)	1997–98	Serie D	30	0	0	0	—		30	0
Lecco	2000–01	Serie C1	13	0	—		—		13	0
Lecco	2001–02	Serie C1	30	0	0	0	—		30	0
Lecco	Total		43	0	0	0	—		43	0
Pizzighettone	2002–03	Serie D	31	0	0	0	—		31	0
Pizzighettone	2003–04	Serie C2	32	0	0	0	2	0	34	0
Pizzighettone	2004–05	Serie C2	32	0	0	0	4	0	36	0
Pizzighettone	Total		95	0	0	0	6	0	101	0
Pro Patria	2005–06	Serie C1	17	0	1	0	—		18	0
Brescia	2005–06	Serie B	12	0	0	0	—		12	0
Brescia	2007–08	Serie B	7	0	0	0	0	0	7	0
Brescia	2008–09	Serie B	6	0	1	0	1	0	8	0
Brescia	2009–10	Serie B	42	0	2	0	4	0	48	0
Brescia	2010–11	Serie A	22	0	2	0	—		24	0
Brescia	2011–12	Serie B	26	0	0	0	—		26	0
Brescia	2012–13	Serie B	40	0	1	0	2	0	43	0
Brescia	2013–14	Serie B	10	0	1	0	—		11	0
Brescia	2014–15	Serie B	28	0	1	0	—		29	0
Brescia	2015–16	Serie B	3	0	0	0	—		3	0
Brescia	2016–17	Serie B	10	0	0	0	—		10	0
Brescia	Total		206	0	8	0	7	0	221	0
Pro Patria (loan)	2006–07	Serie C1	26	0	0	0	—		26	0
Career total			454	0	13	0	13	0	480	0
