= Andrea Caracciolo =

Italian professional footballer (born 1981)

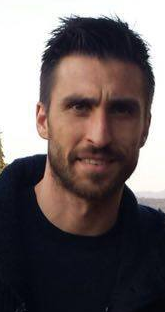

Personal information
- Date of birth: 18 September 1981 (age 45)
- Place of birth: Milan, Italy
- Height: 1.94 m (6 ft 4 1/2 in)
- Position: Striker

Team information
- Current team: Lumezzane (chairman)

Youth career
- 1996–1998: Alcione
- 1998–2000: Sancolombano

Senior career*
Years	Team	Apps	(Gls)
2000–2001	Como	0	(0)
2001	→ Pro Vercelli (loan)	10	(0)
2001–2005	Brescia	72	(26)
2002–2003	→ Perugia (loan)	22	(2)
2005–2007	Palermo	62	(14)
2007–2008	Sampdoria	12	(1)
2008–2011	Brescia	122	(59)
2011–2012	Genoa	12	(1)
2012	→ Novara (loan)	19	(2)
2012–2018	Brescia	205	(87)
2018–2020	FeralpiSalò	53	(20)
2020–2022	Lumezzane	23	(15)

International career
2002	Italy U20	2	(1)
2002–2004	Italy U21	10	(1)
2004–2006	Italy	2	(0)
Medal record
Men's football
Representing Italy
UEFA European Under-21 Championship
Winner	2004 Germany
- * Club domestic league appearances and goals as of 16 February 2020

Andrea Caracciolo (Italian pronunciation: [anˈdrɛːa kaˈrattʃolo]; born 18 September 1981) is an Italian football director and former player, currently chairman of Lumezzane.

A striker, Caracciolo was also a full Italy international, having made two senior appearances between 2004 and 2006.

== Biography ==
Born in Milan to a Southern family and raised in Cesano Boscone, Caracciolo has a diploma in electrical engineering.

Caracciolo's family practiced football: his father, originally from Reggio Calabria, was a midfielder in various Lombard teams; his brother Vincenzo played in Varese, whereas his uncle Fortunato was awarded as the best player in an edition of the Viareggio Tournament.

He is nicknamed Airone (Italian for "heron") for his characteristic way of cheering.

He is married to Gloriana Falletta and has two twin children, Beatrice and Riccardo, born on 5 October 2011.

== Club career ==
=== Early years ===
Caracciolo first football appearances were for Sancolombano of Italian Serie D (amateur league); later playing for Como and Pro Vercelli, both in professional leagues, before being signed by Brescia in June 2001, in co-ownership deal for lire 470 million (€242,735).

=== Brescia ===
Caracciolo made his Serie A debut on 6 January 2002, against Bologna. In June 2002, Brescia bought him outright.

During the 2002–03 Serie A season, he played for Perugia, before returning to Brescia, scoring 12 goals at the end of the 2003–04 season.

=== Palermo ===
After the relegation of Brescia, he was signed by Palermo on 1 July 2005, for €9 million., with €3 million being converted to the signing of Davide Possanzini. He soon became Luca Toni's replacement, who left for Fiorentina. In the 2005–06 season, Caracciolo played 35 games, scoring 9 goals. In the next season, Caracciolo has limited chance since the arrival of Amauri and David Di Michele. He scored only 5 goals in 27 matches, and made 17 starts.

=== Sampdoria ===
In June 2007, was sold to Sampdoria in a co-ownership bid, for €4.25 million. as their centre forward Emiliano Bonazzoli is recovering from injury, Francesco Flachi, Fabio Bazzani and Fabio Quagliarella all left the club. That month also saw Caracciolo replaced Quagliarella, Quagliarella replaced Vincenzo Iaquinta and Fabrizio Miccoli replaced Caracciolo. Moreover, Sampdoria and Palermo formed numbers of swap deal in 2006 summer transfer windows, made there was a net debt of about €2.2 million from Palermo to Sampdoria on 30 June 2007 (without counting Caracciolo; or exactly €3.5 million ca in July 2006);, made the signing of Caracciolo again involved little cash.

He faced competition from Claudio Bellucci, Antonio Cassano and fit again Bonazzoli, which he made only 6 starts.

=== Return to Brescia ===
On 31 January 2008, Caracciolo agreed to return to Brescia in a permanent transfer, for €7.05 million, with Sampdoria received half of the transfer fee (€3.55 million) Yet, instead of receiving cash, Sampdoria signed Morris Donati and Mattia Mustacchio in co-ownership deal for €300,000 and €700,000 respectively and rested of the credit was used for signing Marius Stankevičius (€3M) in early July.

=== Genoa & Novara ===
In 2011–12 Serie A, Caracciolo had half his rights bought by Genoa for €1.5 million in another co-ownership deal, which the club was searching for a reliable centre forward for years; Genoa also failed to sign Antonio Floro Flores early in June and sell Sergio Floccari after the expire of loan. Caracciolo also re-joined former Como owner Enrico Preziosi, who signed former players of Genoa or Como in recent seasons, likes Abdoulay Konko (January 2011), Cesare Bovo (2011). However Caracciolo failed to meet the demand of the management team.

=== Novara ===
In January 2012, Genoa signed Italian internationals Alberto Gilardino and Rodrigo Palacio was recovered. It made Caracciolo no room in starting eleven. Caracciolo was loaned to Serie A struggler Novara (18th at that time), replacing the left of Riccardo Meggiorini. He scored his first goal on 12 February, marking the winner in a 1–0 shock exploit at Stadio San Siro against Inter.

In June 2012, Genoa sold back the 50% registration rights back to Brescia for €200,000.

=== Second return to Brescia ===
Caracciolo became a member of Brescia in 2012–13 Serie B. On 22 November 2014, he scored a hat-trick of penalties in a 3–3 home draw against Carpi, match valid for 15th week of 2014–15 Serie B.

=== Later years ===
In 2018, after his contract with Brescia ended, he signed for Serie C club FeralpiSalò.

On 28 July 2020, he signed a 2-year contract with Lumezzane.

== International career ==
Caracciolo played for the Italy U-21 team, with whom he won a European U-21 Championship in 2004. He also earned a call-up to the 2002 squad.

Under manager Marcello Lippi, Caracciolo made his senior international debut for the Italy national team in a friendly match against Finland on 17 November 2004, held in Messina, coming on as a second-half substitute for Luca Toni; Italy won the match 1–0.

On 16 August 2006, he was recalled to the Azzurri squad by new coach Roberto Donadoni for a friendly game against Croatia held in Livorno, replacing Cristiano Lucarelli in the 65th minute of the 2–0 defeat.

== Post-playing career ==
On 12 April 2022, during a press conference, Lumezzane confirmed Caracciolo's retirement from active football to accept an offer as the club's new director of football with immediate effect. On 6 July 2022, following the club's promotion to Serie D, the board of directors of Lumezzane appointed Caracciolo as the club's new chairman.

== Career statistics ==
=== Club ===
As of 10 February 2018

Club statistics
Club	Season	League			Cup		Europe		Total	
Club	Season	Division	Apps	Goals	Apps	Goals	Apps	Goals	Apps	Goals
Como	2000–01	Serie C1	0	0	—		—		0	0
Pro Vercelli	2000–01	Serie C12	10	0	—		—		10	0
Brescia	2001–02	Serie A	7	2	1	0	3 (Note: All appearance(s) in UEFA Intertoto Cup)	0	11	2
Brescia	2003–04	Serie A	31	12	0	0	3	0	34	12
Brescia	2004–05	Serie A	34	12	1	0	—		35	12
Brescia	Total		72	26	2	0	6	0	80	26
Perugia (loan)	2002–03	Serie A	22	2	5	1	—		27	3
Palermo	2005–06	Serie A	35	9	5	1	6 (Note: All appearance(s) in UEFA Cup)	1	46	11
Palermo	2006–07	Serie A	27	5	2	0	6	1	35	6
Palermo	Total		62	14	7	1	12	2	81	17
Sampdoria	2007–08	Serie A	12	1	2	0	6 (Note: Two appearances in UEFA Intertoto Cup, four appearances in UEFA Cup)	0	27	3
Brescia	2007–08	Serie B	17	8	0	0	—		17	8
Brescia	2008–09	Serie B	35	15	2	2	—		37	17
Brescia	2009–10	Serie B	39	25	1	0	—		40	25
Brescia	2010–11	Serie A	33	12	0	0	—		33	12
Brescia	Total		124	60	3	2	—		127	62
Genoa	2011–12	Serie A	12	1	0	0	—		12	1
Novara (loan)	2011–12	Serie A	19	2	0	0	—		19	2
Brescia	2012–13	Serie B	39	17	1	1	—		40	18
Brescia	2013–14	Serie B	32	18	1	1	—		33	19
Brescia	2014–15	Serie B	29	14	3	2	—		32	16
Brescia	2015–16	Serie B	32	11	0	0	—		32	11
Brescia	2016–17	Serie B	35	14	0	0	—		35	14
Brescia	2017–18	Serie B	35	13	2	0	—		37	13
Brescia	Total		190	83	7	4	—		197	87
Career total			523	189	26	8	24	2	573	199

=== International ===
As of 16 August 2006

Appearances and goals by national team and year
National team	Year	Apps	Goals
Italy	2004	1	0
Italy	2005	0	0
Italy	2006	1	0
Total		2	0
