= Marko Mitrović (footballer, born 1992) =

Swedish footballer

Personal information
- Full name: Marko Mitrović
- Date of birth: 27 June 1992 (age 34)
- Place of birth: Malmö, Sweden
- Height: 1.90 m (6 ft 3 in)
- Position: Forward

Youth career
- 1996–1998: BK Olympic
- 1998–2008: Malmö FF
- 2008–2011: Chelsea

Senior career*
Years	Team	Apps	(Gls)
2011–2012	Chelsea	0	(0)
2012–2014	Brescia	31	(3)
2015–2016	FC Eindhoven	3	(1)
2016–2017	Randers FC	10	(0)
2017–2018	SønderjyskE	12	(1)
2018–2019	Radnički Niš	3	(0)
2019	→ Dinamo Vranje (loan)	7	(1)
2020–2021	Beira-Mar	10	(6)
Total		76	(12)

International career
2007–2009	Sweden U17	11	(10)
- * Club domestic league appearances and goals as of 16:14, 24 May 2020 (UTC)

Marko Mitrović (born 27 June 1992) is a Swedish entrepreneur and former football player. Mitrović is the founder and CEO of Arktis, a health technology company integrating biotechnology, artificial intelligence, and consumer wellness to advance human longevity.

Mitrović came through the ranks of Chelsea's Academy, and was part of their victorious Youth Cup side in 2010, and included a goal in the final against Aston Villa. He moved up to the reserves thereafter, but never made a first-team appearance. He made his professional debut for Brescia in a Coppa Italia match against Cremonese.

== Early life ==
Mitrović was born in Högaholm in Almvik, a neighbourhood of Malmö, Sweden. He is of Serbian descent. He has a younger brother, Alexandar, and an older sister, Christina.

== Club career ==
=== Early career ===
At the age of four, Mitrović began playing football for a local team BK Olympic but shortly moved on to Malmö FF at the age of six.

=== Malmö FF ===
Mitrović joined Malmö FF at the age of six where he spent most of his youth before moving to Chelsea FC in 2008 at the age of sixteen. He scored more goals than appearances made for the club.

=== Chelsea FC ===
Marko agreed to join Chelsea in January 2008, to join as a first-year scholar in June of the same year, staying with his home-town club until the transfer, with semi-regular visits to Cobham. Early signs were that Marko would score goals, and plenty of them. His arrival at Chelsea proper was delayed by participation in the Under-16 Nordic Tournament. In four games, he scored seven goals to easily finish as top goalscorer. He then won the Golden Boot in the Cobham Cup, before his first season was beset by injuries – first a thigh problem, then a back issue, and damaged ankle ligaments ended his season early. He still managed five goals in eight starts, an indication of his ability. Coming back refreshed from a summer break ahead of 2009/10, year two was Marko's breakthrough campaign. He finished top of the club's junior goalscoring ranks, a tally which compared well with the country's leading youth goalscorers, and he was a crucial part of the team's success in the FA Youth Cup, scoring the equaliser in the second leg of the Final against Aston Villa. He missed the first seven months of the 2010–11 season, having undergone surgery to repair damaged ankle ligaments early in the campaign. His return came in early March 2011, in a reserve match away to Bolton Wanderers. Injuries have, however, continued to affect him throughout the year of 2011 and into 2012, and he departed at the end of his contract in June 2012.

=== Brescia Calcio ===
In the summer of 2012, Mitrović joined the Italian Serie B club Brescia Calcio.

==== 2012–13 season ====
He made his professional debut for Brescia in a Coppa Italia match against Cremonese. On 25 August 2012, he made his Serie B debut coming off the bench, in a 1–0 loss against Crotone. He finished the season scoring two goals in 22 games coming off the bench.

==== 2013–14 season ====
In the first game of the 2013–14 season, Mitrović scored his first goal of the season in a Coppa Italia win against S.S. Teramo Calcio.

== International career ==
Marko has represented Sweden at Under-16, Under-17, and Under-19 levels. He took part in Nordic Cup with Sweden where they finished as runners-up, being beaten by Norway. He is, however, also eligible to play for Serbia.

== Style of play ==
He is tall, broad and strong, with good left foot shot and impressive skill levels. Mitrović plays an attacking role, most often playing as a striker but can also play as a winger, and is known for his finishing, pace, dribbling, positioning, strength and his aerial ability. Although left footed, he is also able to control and dribble the ball and finish well with his right foot. Mitrović is known for his pace, skill, control and dribbling ability, as well as his flair in beating players during one on one situations. Uniquely, his height, strength, jumping ability and heading technique have given him an edge in winning aerial challenges for balls, with the majority of his goals often being headers. He has often been compared to a young Zlatan Ibrahimović.

== Business career ==
In 2022, Mitrović founded Arktis, where he is CEO. The company began as a consumer wellness brand and has since expanded into a broader health technology platform operating at the intersection of biotech, AI, and personalized medicine.

Arktis comprises three divisions: Arktis Naturals, which focuses on cannabinoid-based wellness products; Arktis AI, a real-time health optimization platform; and Arktis Biotech, which develops genomic, epigenetic, and pharmacogenetic diagnostic tools.

Mitrović has described Arktis’ mission as: “To extend human lifespan and prevent disease by integrating real-time health data with precision biotech and advanced AI modeling.”

The company has grown under Mitrović’s leadership and, as of 2025, operates globally with thousands of customers and a proprietary data platform aimed at applications in clinical research, pharmaceutical development, and consumer health.

== Career statistics ==
As of match played 8 March 2020

Club	Season	League			Cup (Note: Includes Coppa Italia, Serbian Cup)		Europe		Other		Total	
Club	Season	Division	Apps	Goals	Apps	Goals	Apps	Goals	Apps	Goals	Apps	Goals
Brescia	2012–13	Serie B	24	2	1	0	—		—		25	2
Brescia	2013–14	Serie B	7	1	2	1	—		—		9	2
Brescia	Total		31	3	3	1	—		—		34	4
FC Eindhoven	2015–16	Eerste Divisie	3	1	0	0	—		1 (Note: Appearance(s) in Eerste Divisie play-offs)	0	4	1
Randers	2016–17	Danish Superliga	10	0	0	0	—		—		10	0
SønderjyskE	2016–17	Danish Superliga	9	1	0	0	—		—		9	1
SønderjyskE	2017–18	Danish Superliga	3	0	0	0	—		—		3	0
SønderjyskE	Total		12	1	0	0	—		—		12	1
Radnički Niš	2018–19	Serbian SuperLiga	3	0	1	3	0	0	—		4	3
Dinamo Vranje (loan)	2018–19	Serbian SuperLiga	7	1	0	0	—		0	0	7	1
Beira-Mar	2019–20	Campeonato de Portugal Serie C	7	4	0	0	—		—		7	4
Career total			73	10	4	4	0	0	1	0	78	14

== Honours ==
=== Chelsea FC U18 ===
- Cobham Cup (1): 2008-09
- FA Youth Cup (1): 2009-10
- Premier Reserve League (1): 2010-11

=== Chelsea FC ===
- Champions League (1): 2011-12

=== Individual ===
- Cobham Cup Golden Boot (1): 2008-09
