= Sergio Viotti (footballer) =

Italian footballer

Personal information
- Date of birth: 4 March 1990 (age 36)
- Place of birth: Brescia, Italy
- Height: 1.86 m (6 ft 1 in)
- Position: Goalkeeper

Team information
- Current team: Franciacorta FC

Youth career
- Brescia

Senior career*
Years	Team	Apps	(Gls)
2008–2010	Brescia	1	(0)
2008–2009	→ Bellaria (loan)	27	(0)
2010–2011	Triestina	9	(0)
2011–2015	Chievo	0	(0)
2011–2012	→ Triestina (loan)	17	(0)
2012	→ Grosseto (loan)	5	(0)
2013	→ Cremonese (loan)	11	(0)
2013–2014	→ Juve Stabia (loan)	12	(0)
2014–2015	→ Monza (loan)	18	(0)
2015	→ Pro Vercelli (loan)	0	(0)
2015–2016	Martina	31	(0)
2016–2017	Giana Erminio	33	(0)
2018–2019	Ciliverghe	10	(0)
2020–	Franciacorta FC	5	(0)

International career
2006	Italy U-16	12	(0)
2006–2007	Italy U-17	6	(0)
2009	Italy U-20	2	(0)
2011	Italy U-21	4	(0)
- * Club domestic league appearances and goals as of 19:26, 14 June 2020 (UTC)

Sergio Viotti (born 4 March 1990) is an Italian professional footballer who plays as a goalkeeper for Serie D club Franciacorta FC.

== Club career ==
=== Brescia ===
Born in Brescia, Lombardy, Viotti started his career at Brescia Calcio. He was the starting goalkeeper of Primavera team in 2007–08 season, ahead of Andrea Caroppo. In June 2008 he left for Bellaria – Igea Marina. On 1 July 2009, he returned to Brescia and promoted to first team (despite still eligible to Primavera, which was played by Nicola Leali and Michal Hrivňák). He was assigned shirt no.22 that season, (which he had since 2006–07 season but did not play) winning the promotion play-off with team to Serie A.

=== Triestina ===
In August 2010 he left for Serie B team Triestina in co-ownership deal, for €50,000. He was the understudy of Roberto Colombo.

=== Chievo and loans ===
On 24 June 2011, Triestina bought him outright for another €50,000 but in August sold to Serie A team Chievo, rejoining international team-mate Marco Silvestri (who already left on loan to Reggiana). Chievo also signed Alessandro Longhi and re-sold half of the rights to Sassuolo. On 31 August he returned to Trieste.

Viotti was the starting keeper for Triestina in 2011–12 Lega Pro Prima Divisione. However, in January 2012 Grosseto loaned Viotti from Chievo. Viotti was the understudy of Antonio Narciso and wore the number 23 shirt.

In July 2012 he returned to Verona. In January 2013 he was signed by Cremonese.

On 16 July 2013, he was signed by Juve Stabia.

On 10 July 2014, he was signed by Monza. On 8 January 2015, he was signed by Pro Vercelli.

=== Martina ===
Viotti was signed by Martina on a free transfer in summer 2015.

== International career ==
Viotti represented Italy at youth level, playing for the Azzurrini (little Sky-Blues) from under-16 to under-21 level.

=== U-16 ===
With the Italy under-16 side, Viotti finished as the runner-up in a youth tournament held in Montaigu, Vendée, France. He started all 4 matches.

=== U-17 ===
Viotti was a regular for the Italy under-17 side in 2007 UEFA European Under-17 Football Championship qualification, under manager Luca Gotti (playing 2 out of 3 matches, the first match against Andorra was played by Mattia Lanzano) and in the elite qualification (playing the first match, then serving as a backup to Vincenzo Fiorillo).

=== U-18 & U-19 ===
Viotti also received a call-up to the Italy U-18 and U-19 team training camp from manager Francesco Rocca. However, the team's new coach Massimo Piscedda dropped both Fiorillo (who was promoted to the U-21 side) and Viotti, as well as Carlo Pinsoglio, (who was ineligible to be called-up); the Azzurrini were eliminated from the first qualifying round held in Moldova.

=== U-20 ===
In February 2009, Viotti was promoted to the Italy under-20 team, and played in the third round of the 2008–09 Four Nations Tournament. He benched on the next game as understudy of Pinsoglio against England in March, but was later dropped for the fourth round of the competition. He was in the preliminary 30-man squad for the 2009 FIFA U-20 World Cup, but was not included in the final squad coached by Rocca. He later played the first round of 2009–10 Four Nations Tournament, during which he was substituted by Alex Teodorani in the second half. Since then he was dropped from the under-20 national squad.

=== U-21 ===
In January 2011, Viotti was called-up by Ciro Ferrara, the coach of under-21 team. After missing the team's next four friendlies following his first call-up, he returned to the team as the first choice goalkeeper in the 2011 Toulon Tournament, featuring in all of Italy's matches except the last bronze medal match, which was played by Marco Silvestri. He was dropped again from the squad ahead of the team's 2013 European Under-21 Championship qualifying campaign.

== Personal life ==
Viotti is a friend of Mario Balotelli, also a footballer and former international team-mate.
