= Joojo Rocky Obeng =

Ghanaian politician

Hon. Joojo Rocky Obeng
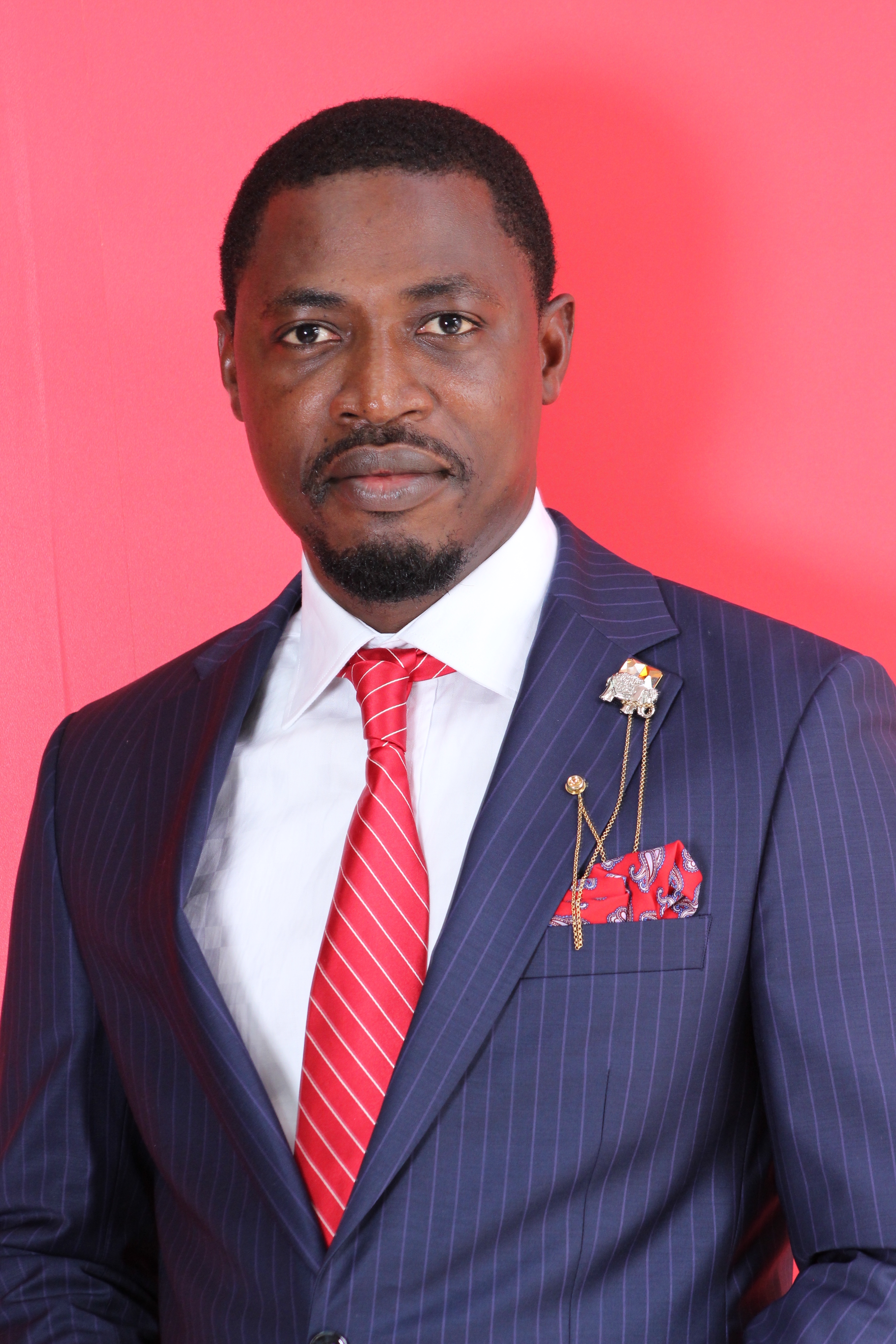

Western North Regional Minister
- In office 11 March 2021 – January 2025
- President: Nana Akufo-Addo
- Preceded by: Kingsley Aboagye Gyedu
- Succeeded by: Wilbert Petty Brentum

Personal details
- Born: Joojo Rocky Obeng; 2 April 1981 (age 45) Sekondi
- Party: New Patriotic Party
- Education: University of Ghana; University of Witwatersrand
- Occupation: Financial Analyst, Civil Society Activist, Entrepreneur and Politician

Joojo Rocky Obeng (born 1981) is a Ghanaian politician, financial analyst, chief executive officer of the International Settlement Consortium who served as a former regional minister of Western North Region in 11 March 2021.

== Education ==
He graduated with a bachelor's and master's degree in Finance from the University of the Witwatersrand in Johannesburg. Prior to obtaining the Bcom Hons – Finance, he had studied Economics and Statistics at the University of Ghana, Legon for three years after which he transferred to the University of Witwatersrand.

== Career ==
He completed a United States Agency for International Development (USAID) in October 2013, a six month sponsored intensive Research & Writing Program at the George Washington University Law School, Washington DC. His publication on corporate bailout authored by was featured in the globally reputed Business & Finance Law Review (BFLR).

As a Financial Engineer and a Deputy Chief Executive Officer at the National Youth Authority, he has facilitated financing partnership deals with STAR-Ghana Foundation, United Nations Development Program (UNDP), United Nations International Children’s fund (UNICEF) and Care International.

Before he was appointment as Deputy Chief Executive Officer, he was the Executive Director of the Centre for National Affairs (CNA) where he led several innovative national policy discussions on public health financing.

=== Politics ===
He is the regional minister for Western North Region.
