= Luigi Scaglia =

Italian footballer

Personal information
- Full name: Luigi Alberto Scaglia
- Date of birth: 23 November 1986 (age 39)
- Place of birth: Chiari, Italy
- Height: 1.82 m (5 ft 11 1/2 in)
- Positions: Left back; midfielder

Team information
- Current team: Sporting Franciacorta

Youth career
- Brescia

Senior career*
Years	Team	Apps	(Gls)
2006–2009	Brescia	14	(0)
2006–2007	→ Lumezzane (loan)	37	(6)
2008–2009	→ Lumezzane (loan)	30	(5)
2009–2010	Lumezzane	22	(3)
2010–2015	Brescia	134	(12)
2010–2011	→ Torino (loan)	19	(1)
2011	→ Cremonese (loan)	12	(4)
2015–2017	Latina	60	(9)
2017–2019	Parma	29	(1)
2018	→ Foggia (loan)	13	(0)
2018-2019	→ Catania (loan)	12	(0)
2019	→ Carrarese (loan)	14	(0)
2019–2020	Trapani	21	(1)
2020–	Sporting Franciacorta	11	(1)
- * Club domestic league appearances and goals as of 31 August 2019

Luigi Alberto Scaglia (born 23 November 1986) is an Italian footballer who plays for Serie D club Sporting Franciacorta.

== Biography ==
=== Brescia & Lumezzane ===
Born in Chiari, the Province of Brescia, Scaglia spent a few seasons on loan to Lega Pro club Lumezzane, which he played for the club in the second half of 2005–06 Serie C1 season, whole 2006–07 Serie C2 season and whole 2008–09 Lega Pro Prima Divisione season. He also returned to Brescia for 2007–08 Serie B. In 2009–10 Lega Pro Prima Divisione season Lumezzane bought him in a co-ownership deal.

==== Torino (loan) ====
In January 2010 Brescia bought back Scaglia from Lumezzane, but loaned him to fellow Serie B team Torino. The team losing some players as they were frighten by the ultras and submitted transfer request. Torino finished as the 5th and entered the promotion playoffs, which losing to Brescia in the finals. Scaglia played the first leg of the finals as starter in its 3-4-2-1 formation, supporting the central forward Rolando Bianchi along with winger Andrea Gasbarroni.

Torino did not excised the option to sign him in a co-ownership deal in June 2010. However, on 31 August the loan was extended.

==== Cremonese (loan) ====
On 27 January 2011, the loan was terminated and he was loaned to Lega Pro Prime Division club Cremonese from Brescia.

==== Return to Brescia (2011–2015) ====
In summer 2011 Scaglia returned to Brescia, being part of the first team. On 3 July 2013 Scaglia signed a new 2-year contract.

=== Latina ===
On 1 July 2015 Scaglia was signed by Latina on a free transfer in a 3-year contract.

=== Parma ===
On 31 January 2017 Scaglia was signed by Parma from Latina in a 2 1/2-year contract.

==== Foggia (loan) ====
On 12 January 2018, Scaglia was loaned to Serie B team Foggia.

==== Catania (loan) ====
On 27 August 2018, he joined Serie C club Catania on loan.

==== Carrarese (loan) ====
On 31 January 2019, Scaglia joined Carrarese on loan until 30 June 2019.

=== Trapani and Sporting Franciacorta ===
On 23 August 2019, Scaglia joined Trapani for an undisclosed fee. He left Trapani in 2020 to sign for Serie D club Sporting Franciacorta.
