= Pasquale Turi =

Italian footballer

Personal information
- Date of birth: 18 May 1993 (age 33)
- Place of birth: Bari, Italy
- Height: 1.76 m (5 ft 9 in)
- Position: Defender

Youth career
- –2011: Bari

Senior career*
Years	Team	Apps	(Gls)
2011–2012	Taranto	0	(0)
2012	→ Giacomense (loan)	9	(1)
2012–2013	Pavia	8	(0)
2013–2014	Siena	0	(0)
2013–2014	→ Chieti (loan)	25	(0)
2014–2015	Forlì	24	(0)
2015–2017	Virtus Francavilla	21	(0)
2018	Fidelis Andria	1	(0)
2018–2019	Matera	0	(0)

International career
2012	Italy U20 "C"	1	(0)
- * Club domestic league appearances and goals as of 22:25, 3 June 2019 (UTC)

Pasquale Turi (born 18 May 1993) is an Italian footballer who plays as a defender.

== Career ==
Born in Bari, Apulia, Turi started his professional career at Taranto after leaving the reserve of A.S. Bari during 2010–11 season. Turi was a midfielder or forward for Bari youth teams. He was the member of the reserve of Taranto from circa January 2011 until January 2012. Primary a midfielder, he also played for the reserve as forward, scoring a hat-trick against the reserve of Campobasso. In January 2012, 6 months before the bankruptcy of Taranto, he was loaned to Giacomense. In the same month his also received call-up to represent the Lega Pro 1st Div. Group A in the quadrangular tournament, but as a defender. Eventually Turi was the champion. In April 2012 he received call-up from Lega Pro under-20 representative team to Dubai for a youth tournament against youth team of other football clubs, which Italy Lega Pro was the champion. In June 2012, Turi was among the team that winning San Marino under-21.

In the next season Turi left for Pavia.

On 17 July 2013 he received a call-up to pre-season camp of newly relegated Serie B team A.C. Siena. On 13 August 2013 Turi left for Chieti in temporary deal.

After the bankruptcy of Siena, Turi was signed by Forlì.

On 2 November 2018, Turi joined Matera. In February 2019, Matera was excluded from the Italian Serie C, and in the beginning of March 2019 it was announced, that Turi had left the club and was free to join another club.
