= Daniele Paparusso =

Italian footballer (born 1993)

Personal information
- Date of birth: 26 March 1993 (age 33)
- Place of birth: Andria, Italy
- Height: 1.80 m (5 ft 11 in)
- Position: Defender

Team information
- Current team: Fidelis Andria

Youth career
- Andria
- –2012: Siena

Senior career*
Years	Team	Apps	(Gls)
2010–2011	Siena	0	(0)
2010–2011	→ Castel Rigone (loan)	15	(0)
2012	Castel Rigone	17	(0)
2012–2014	Poggibonsi	27	(1)
2013–2014	→ Ternana (loan)	3	(0)
2014–2015	Pontedera	12	(0)
2015	Grosseto	18	(0)
2015–2016	Tuttocuoio	20	(1)
2016–2017	Vibonese	15	(0)
2017	Racing Roma	16	(0)
2017–2018	Fondi	30	(0)
2018	Pro Piacenza	0	(0)
2018–2019	Fidelis Andria	26	(1)
2019–2020	Casertana	23	(1)
2020–	Fidelis Andria	3	(0)
- * Club domestic league appearances and goals as of 11 October 2020

Daniele Paparusso (Italian pronunciation: [daˈnjɛːle papaˈrusso]; born 26 March 1993) is an Italian football player. He plays for Fidelis Andria.

== Club career ==
He made his Serie B debut for Ternana on 2 December 2013 in a game against Bari.

On 29 August 2019, he joined Serie C club Casertana.

On 18 September 2020, he returned to Fidelis Andria.
