= Francis Obeng =

Ghanaian footballer

Personal information
- Date of birth: 7 February 1986 (age 40)
- Place of birth: Tema, Ghana
- Height: 1.76 m (5 ft 9 in)
- Position: Midfielder

Team information
- Current team: Santarcangelo
- Number: 20

Senior career*
Years	Team	Apps	(Gls)
2008–2011	Santarcangelo	86	(8)
2011–2014	Carpi	0	(0)
2011–2014	→ Santarcangelo (loan)	69	(3)
2014	Roma	0	(0)
2014	→ Santarcangelo (loan)	10	(1)
2014–2015	Santarcangelo	18	(1)
2015	Napoli	0	(0)
2015	→ Santarcangelo (loan)	13	(3)
2015–2016	Santarcangelo	22	(0)
2016–2017	Melfi	23	(1)
2017–	Santarcangelo	9	(0)
- * Club domestic league appearances and goals as of 22 October 2017

Francis Obeng (born 7 February 1986) is a Ghanaian footballer who plays for Santarcangelo.

== Biography ==
Born in Tema, Ghana, Obeng was a player of Santarcangelo since 2008. He followed the team promoted from Serie D to Lega Pro Seconda Divisione in 2011. He was also signed by Carpi in co-ownership deal in July 2011; In June 2012 Carpi acquired him outright. Obeng returned to Santarcangelo in temporary deal again on 31 August 2012 and on 16 July 2013.

On 30 January 2014 Obeng was signed by A.S. Roma in order to exploit his non-EU status for non-EU signing quota of Roma.
