= Federico Scappi =

Italian footballer

Personal information
- Date of birth: 13 May 1994 (age 32)
- Place of birth: Guastalla, Italy
- Height: 1.85 m (6 ft 1 in)
- Position: Defender

Youth career
- –2013: Reggiana
- 2010–2012: → Inter (loan)

Senior career*
Years	Team	Apps	(Gls)
2012–2013	Reggiana	9	(0)
2013–2015	Chievo	0	(0)
2013–2014	→ Reggiana (loan)	0	(0)
2014–2015	→ Lentigione (loan)	25	(5)
2015–2016	Luzzara	33	(4)
2016–2017	Fidentina	17	(4)
2017–2019	Luzzara	61	(21)
2019–2020	Rimini	17	(1)
- * Club domestic league appearances and goals as of 15 December 2019

Federico Scappi (born 13 May 1994) is an Italian footballer who plays as a defender.

== Career ==
Born in Guastalla, the Province of Reggio-Emilia, Emilia region, Scappi started his career at Reggio for Reggiana. On 27 July 2010 he was signed by Serie A defending champion of 2010, Lombardy club Inter in temporary deal for €30,000 with option to purchase half of the registration rights. Scappi was a player of Inter U17 team in 2010–11 season. In June the loan deal was renewed for €50,000. Scappi spent another season for Inter U18 team in 2011–12 Berretti League. Scappi returned to Emilia for its U19 reserve on 1 July 2012, despite also in Berretti League. He also played 9 times for the first team in 2012–13 Lega Pro Prima Divisione.

Scappi also represented Lega Pro U19 team (born 1993 team) against representative of Serie D and Italy U19 (born 1994) during 2012–13 season.

On 10 July 2013 Scappi was signed by another Serie A club Chievo with Valerio Anastasi moved to opposite direction. Scappi also returned to Reggio on the same day along with Matteo Solini from Chievo in temporary deals. Scappi was a player of the reserve as overage player in 2013–14 season. On 20 June 2014 Reggiana bought back Scappi.

However, on 20 August Scappi joined Eccellenza Emilia–Romagna team Lentigione. Lentigione won promotion to Serie D in summer 2015.

Scappi played in the fifth and sixth tier (Eccellenza and Promozione) for the next 4 seasons.

On 30 July 2019 he signed with Serie C club Rimini. On 17 January 2020, his Rimini contract was terminated by mutual consent.
