= Marco Martina Rini =

Italian footballer (born 1990)

Personal information
- Date of birth: 4 March 1990 (age 36)
- Place of birth: Brescia, Italy
- Height: 1.76 m (5 ft 9 1/2 in)
- Position: Midfielder

Team information
- Current team: Grumellese Calcio

Youth career
- ?–2010: Brescia

Senior career*
Years	Team	Apps	(Gls)
2007–2015	Brescia	32	(0)
2010–2011	→ Verona (loan)	20	(2)
2013–2014	→ Cremonese (loan)	21	(2)
2016–2017	Forlì	5	(0)
2017	Lecco	10	(0)
2018–2020	Grumellese Calcio	7	(0)
2020-2021	Darfo Boario	?	(?)
2021-	Nuova Valsabbia	?	(?)
Total		?	(?)

International career
2007	Italy U17	2	(0)
2008	Italy U19	3	(0)
2009–2010	Italy U20	3	(0)
- * Club domestic league appearances and goals as of 4 March 2018

Marco Martina Rini (born 4 March 1990) is an Italian footballer who plays for ASD Grumellese Calcio.

== Biography ==
A youth product of Brescia, Martina Rini has played twice for the hometown club in Serie B despite young age. On 27 October 2007, he substituted Leandro Depetris in the 83rd minute against Triestina. The team Brescia won the Trieste club 4–1. Martina Rini played his first start in the last round (round 42) of 2007–08 Serie B. That match Brescia 1–1 draw with the bottom team Avellino. Both team failed to enter promotion playoffs and protected its place in Serie B respectively before the start of the match. He wore no.30 shirt of the team in 2009–10 Serie B, and won promotion to Serie A as unused member.

On 21 July 2010, he was loaned to Verona along with Fabrizio Paghera Verona has a first option to sign them outright in June 2011.

Martina Rini became a first team member of Brescia in 2011–12 Serie B. On 10 January 2013 he was signed by Cremonese. The loan was renewed on 13 July.
