= Valerio Anastasi =

Italian footballer

Personal information
- Full name: Valerio Anastasi
- Date of birth: 13 April 1990 (age 36)
- Place of birth: Catania, Italy
- Height: 1.91 m (6 ft 3 in)
- Position: Striker

Team information
- Current team: FC Clivense

Youth career
- –2009: Chievo

Senior career*
Years	Team	Apps	(Gls)
2008–2015	Chievo	1	(0)
2009–2010	→ Pergocrema (loan)	7	(0)
2010	→ Villacidrese (loan)	9	(3)
2010–2011	→ Lecco (loan)	10	(1)
2011	→ Südtirol (loan)	1	(0)
2011–2012	→ Chieti (loan)	26	(8)
2012–2013	→ Santarcangelo (loan)	32	(16)
2013–2014	Reggiana	29	(7)
2014–2015	Chievo	0	(0)
2014–2015	→ Monza (loan)	14	(5)
2015	→ Pistoiese (loan)	16	(4)
2015–2016	Mantova	8	(1)
2016	→ Pistoiese (loan)	11	(1)
2016–2017	Catania	8	(1)
2017	→ Messina (loan)	12	(4)
2017–2018	Catanzaro	9	(0)
2018–2019	Virtus Francavilla	24	(4)
2019–2021	OSA		
2021–	FC Clivense		
- * Club domestic league appearances and goals as of 12 December 2018

Valerio Anastasi (born 13 April 1990) is an Italian footballer who plays as a striker for Italian amateurs FC Clivense.

== Career ==
Anastasi made his Serie A debut for A.C. ChievoVerona on 14 December 2008 in a game against F.C. Internazionale Milano when he came on as a substitute in the 86th minute for Luciano.

In summer 2013 Anastasi was signed by Reggiana in a co-ownership deal (while Federico Scappi moved in the opposite direction). In June 2014 Chievo bought back Anastasi.

On 11 July 2014 Anastasi was signed by Monza on a temporary deal.

Anastasi was signed by Pistoiese on 7 January 2015. He was signed by Mantova in the summer of 2015, but returned to Pistoiese in January 2016 on a temporary deal.

On 19 July 2016 Anastasi was signed by Calcio Catania on a 2-year deal.

On 31 January 2017 Messina signed Anastasi on loan.

On 31 January 2018 Anastasi joined Virtus Francavilla. On 14 January 2019, he was released from his Virtus Francavilla contract by mutual consent.

In May 2019, Anastasi joined American club OSA FC, owned by Italien entrepreneur Giuseppe Pezzano.

In September 2021, he returned to play in Italy, joining Terza Categoria amateurs FC Clivense, a club founded by former Chievo star Sergio Pellissier.
