= Samuel Obeng (linguist) =

Linguist

Samuel Gyasi Obeng is a Ghanaian-American linguist. He is currently Distinguished Professor of Linguistics and the Director of the West African Languages Institute (WALI) at Indiana University Bloomington (IUB). He is affiliated with IUB’s Linguistics Department, African Studies Program (Hamilton-Lugar School of Global and International Studies) and holds Adjunct Professorship positions in the Departments of African American and African Diaspora Studies, Middle Eastern Languages and Cultures, and Islamic Studies

Obeng has written extensively (35 books and 135 refereed articles) about language and liberty, African communicational mores, especially, verbal indirection, political, juridical, religious, health and informal discourses, African onomasiology and African languages documentation.

Obeng has appeared on radio (Public Radio International, WFHB, Ghana Broadcasting Corporation, etc.), television (GTV, etc.) and in print media to present some of his work and provide expert opinion on social and political issues in Africa. He has been a keynote speaker at important conferences, won important awards and served as external evaluator for universities in Africa, Oceania, Asia, Europe, the Americas and the Greater Middle East.

== Education ==
Obeng obtained his Bachelor of Arts (Honors) degree in Linguistics in 1981 at the University of Ghana, Legon-Accra (Ghana). He earned his Doctor of Philosophy (D.Phil.) from the University of York in England (UK) in 1988 specializing in Language and Linguistics Science with emphasis on Phonetics, Phonology and Pragmatics with a dissertation entitled, Conversational Strategies: Towards a Phonological Description of Projection in Akyem-Twi.

== Research interests ==
Obeng’s primary research interests are in African linguistics, conversational phonetics, Firthian Prosodic Phonology, language and liberty, Discourse-Pragmatics (especially institutional discourse, language and law, language and politics, language and religion, language and health), Multilingualism and Language Contact.

An expert in African Social Interaction, Obeng is credited for being the first linguist to investigate how Conversation Analytic methodology informs and restructures our understanding of the functioning of phonetic detail and phonetic distinction and variation in an African language. His work scrutinizes the phonetic resources used by African language interactional participants in institutional domains (e.g., courtrooms, political arenas, health institutions, etc.) and in informal discourse settings. He has examined how speakers employ phonetic features like pitch, loudness, tempo, voice quality (e.g., creaky, plain and breathy phonation types), rhythm, as well as vowel and consonant quality to manage interactional categories like turn-taking, repair, overlapping talk, backchannel communications, concurrence, descensions, requests, apologies, cross-examinations as well as bad and good news delivery. Obeng has also investigated how listeners orient to and are impacted by the above-mentioned phonetic features. These have resulted in the publication of several books and refereed journal articles and book chapters.

Obeng’s work on language and liberty draws inspiration from Sir Isaiah Berlin’s (1960) Four Essays on Liberty and investigates how people with less power use resistive speech to challenge the validity claims of powerful political, judicial, health and religious actors. His work on African onomasiology, especially anthroponymy (personal names) and toponymy (place names), which draws on names from over 30 African languages and cultures is one of the most comprehensive works in the study of African onomasiology. African names, according to Obeng, provide us with insights into linguistic structure via morphophonology, syntax, semantics, ethnopragmatics, geography, history, politics and other human phenomena.

== Awards ==
- Distinguished Professor (Indiana University) 2022
- Carnegie African Diaspora Fellow 2015 & 2016
- McGraw-Hill Higher Education Distinguished Scholar Award 2015
- Distinguished Service Award. African Language Research Project (University of Maryland, Eastern Shore (UMES) 2005
- Distinguished Research Scholar in African Linguistics (UMES) 2004
- Outstanding Performance and Lasting Contribution as a Research Consultant in African languages (UMES) 2002
- James S. Coleman African Studies Scholar Award (UCLA) 1993
- Association of Commonwealth Universities Scholar 1984-1987.

== Academic work ==
Discipline: Linguistics
Sub-discipline:

- African Linguistics
- Conversational Phonetics
- Discourse-Pragmatics (especially language and liberty, institutional discourse, language and law, language and politics, language and religion, language and health)
- Multilingualism and Language Contact.
- Firthian Prosodic Phonology
- African Onomasiology.

== Publications ==
Obeng has published many articles, books and book chapters, including:

- 2018 - Conflict Resolution in Africa: Language, Law and Politeness in Ghanaian (Akan) Jurisprudence A. Durham (NC): Carolina Academic Press.
  - Language and Liberty in Ghanaian Political Communication: A Critical Discourse Perspective Ghana Journal of Linguistics, 7(2): 199-224.
  - with Lotven, Samson - Nasality in Gengbe Syllables. African Linguistics in the 21st Century: Essays in Honor of Paul Newman.
- 2019, with Lotven, Samson; Botne, Robert; Bongiovanni, Silvina & Weirich, Phillip - African Linguistics across the Disciplines: Proceedings of the 48th Conference of the Association of Contemporary African Linguistics. Language Science Press. Berlin: Germany.
  - with Debrah, Emmanuel - AGhanaian Politics and Political CommunicationA. London & New York: Rowman and Littlefield International.
- 2020 - Grammatical Pragmatics: Language, Power and Liberty in African (Ghanaian) Political Discourse. Discourse and Society, 31(1): 85-105.
  - A Nation in Crises. Conneaut Lake, PA: Page Publishing.
- 2021, with Obeng, Cecilia - Invisible Faces; Hidden Stories: Narratives of Vulnerable Populations and Their Caregivers. Oxford, UK: Berghahn Books.
- 2022 - Language and Liberty. Legon Journal of Humanities 33(1): 138-159.
  - with Kofi Agyekum - Topics in West African Discourse Pragmatics. Cologne-Germany: Rüdiger Koeppe Verlag.
  - Discursive strategies for managing bad news: Exemplification from Akan (Ghana). In Galen Sibanda, Deo Ngonyani, Jonathan Choti & Ann Biersteker (eds.), Descriptive and theoretical approaches to African linguistics: Selected papers from the 49th Annual Conference on African Linguistics, 295-323. Berlin: Language Science Press.
- 2023, with Kwesi Brown - English-Efutu Dictionary with Phonetic Transcription and Cultural Mores. Cologne-Germany: Rüdiger Koeppe Verlag.
  - with Ofori, Seth Antwi - Language, Power and Liberty: Discursive Constructions of Ghanaian Glossolalic Speeches. Discourse and Society.
