= Antonio Di Nardo (footballer, born 1979) =

Italian footballer (born 1979)

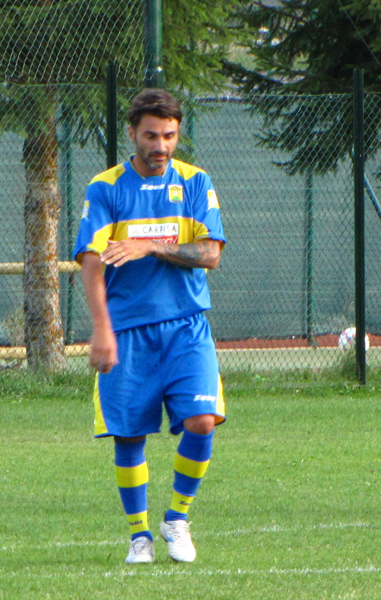

Personal information
- Date of birth: 23 July 1979 (age 47)
- Place of birth: Mugnano di Napoli, Italy
- Height: 1.70 m (5 ft 7 in)
- Position: Forward

Youth career
- 1995–1996: Napoli

Senior career*
Years	Team	Apps	(Gls)
1996–1999	Savoia	34	(2)
1999–2000	Giugliano	29	(5)
2000–2002	Taranto	31	(6)
2002–2005	Benevento	87	(27)
2005–2007	Frosinone	54	(12)
2006	→ Pistoiese (loan)	15	(10)
2007–2011	Padova	101	(23)
2011–2013	Cittadella	44	(14)
2013–2014	Ischia	14	(1)
2014	Juve Stabia	6	(1)
2014–2015	Carrarese	22	(0)
2015	Chieti	5	(0)
2016	Frattese	10	(0)

Managerial career
- 2020–2021: Napoli (U17 assistant)
- * Club domestic league appearances and goals

Antonio Di Nardo (born 23 July 1979) is an Italian former footballer who played as a forward.

== Club career ==
Di Nardo grew up in Naples and initially played for Napoli's youth side before beginning his professional career in Serie C1 with Savoia in 1996. He subsequently played for Giugliano, Taranto, Benevento and Pistoia in Serie C2 and Serie C1. In 2006, he obtained promotion to Serie B with Frosinoine. In 2007, he was signed by Padova, with whom he played in Serie C1 and later Serie B.

In 2011 Di Nardo was sold to fellow Serie B club Cittadella on a free transfer. In 2013, he was signed by Ischia. In January 2014, he moved to Juve Stabia.

On 24 September 2014 Di Nardo was signed by Carrarese as a free agent.
