= 2012–13 Parma FC season =

Parma
2012–13 season
- President: Tommaso Ghirardi
- Manager: Roberto Donadoni
- Stadium: Stadio Ennio Tardini
- Serie A: 10th
- Coppa Italia: Round of 16
- Top goalscorer: League: Amauri (9); All: Amauri (9)
- Highest home attendance: 15,966 vs Internazionale (26 November 2012)
- Lowest home attendance: 9,909 vs Chievo (2 September 2012)
- Average home league attendance: 12,156
Home colours	Away colours	Third colours

The 2012–13 season was Parma Football Club's 22nd season in Serie A, and their fourth consecutive season in the top-flight, having finished in eighth position in the previous season. The team is also competing in the Coppa Italia and benefit from a bye to the Round of 16 after the strong league finish.

== Pre-season ==
On 4 June 2012, the club announced its intention to go on a pre-retiro in Sardinia from 4 until 10 July. This was to be followed by a third consecutive season retiro in Levico Terme from 14 until 28 July, where they would again face Levico and Slavia Prague. Thirty-one players were initially selected to take part. From 31 July to 5 August would be spent in Prague, where two friendlies were organised.

Kick-off times are in CET or CEST.

Win Draw Loss

21 July 2012 Friendly	Parma (Italy)	3 – 3	(Czech Republic) Slavia Prague	Levico Terme
17:00	Amauri 26'; Galloppa 49'; Lucarelli 76'	Report	15' Koreš; 61' Kisel; 63' Vošahlík	Attendance: 1,000 approx. Referee: Massimiliano Rasia

22 July 2012 Three-way friendly	Levico Terme (Italy)	0 – 2	(Italy) Parma	Levico Terme
17:30		Report	17' Pabón; 33' Belfodil	Attendance: 800 approx. Referee: Luca Detta

22 July 2012 Three-way friendly	Rappresentativa Memorial Barbieri (Italy)	0 – 5	(Italy) Parma	Levico Terme
18:30		Report	Palladino 5', 9'; Pellè 7', 28', 38'	Attendance: 800 approx. Referee: Diego Provesi

27 July 2012 Friendly	Parma (Italy)	4 – 1	(Italy) Renate	Levico Terme
17:30	Belfodil 31'; Palladino 51', 55'; Gobbi 76'	Report	47' Brighenti	Attendance: 250 approx. Referee: Andrea Zuliani

28 July 2012 Friendly	Parma (Italy)	2 – 2	(Italy) Varese	Levico Terme
17:30	Biabiany 29'; MacEachen 71'	Report	De Luca 4'; Tripoli 48'	Attendance: 600 approx. Referee: Marco Bellotti

1 August 2012 Friendly	Bohemians 1905 (Czech Republic)	2 – 1	(Italy) Parma	Ďolíček, Prague
18:00	Jindřišek 15'; Šumský 41'	Report	11' Pabón	Attendance: 3,000 approx. Referee: Libor Kovařík

4 August 2012 Friendly	Horní Měcholupy/Viktoria Žižkov (Czech Republic)	0 – 1	(Italy) Parma	Stadion na Plynárně, Prague
18:00		Report	52' Belfodil	Attendance: 1,000 approx. Referee: Jan Dobry

8 August 2012 Friendly	Parma (Italy)	2 – 0	(Spain) Real Sociedad	Stadio Ennio Tardini, Parma
20:45	Lucarelli 33'; Morrone 90+1'	Report		Attendance: 2,347; Referee: Andrea De Marco

12 August 2012 Friendly	Palermo (Italy)	4 – 1	(Italy) Parma	Stadio Renzo Barbera, Palermo
20:45	Barreto 38'; Iličić 45+1'; Pisano 50'; Budan 84'	Report	40' Lucarelli	Attendance: 5,864; Referee: Gianpaolo Calvarese

18 August 2012 Friendly	Parma (Italy)	3 – 1	(Greece) Panionios	Stadio Comunale, Orzinuovi
18:30	Pabón 8', 43'; Parolo 31'	Report	77' Diamantakos	Attendance: 400 approx. Referee: Gianluca Manganiello

8 September 2012 Friendly	Parma (Italy)	1 – 1	(Italy) Sampdoria	Stadio Ennio Tardini, Parma
20:45	Fideleff 38'	Report	83' Éder	Attendance: 1,078; Referee: Andrea Romeo

== Competitions ==
=== Serie A ===
Parma's first game of the season was a trip to Turin to face champions Juventus. Banned for his part in the 2011–12 Italian football scandal, Juventus boss Antonio Conte saw his side win 2–0 through second Stephan Lichtsteiner and Andrea Pirlo goals in the second half. Parma goalkeeper Antonio Mirante had saved a dubiously awarded penalty in the first half. There was some doubt whether or not Pirlo's effort crossed the line, but Parma coach Roberto Donadoni refused to comment.

==== League table ====
Pos	Team	Pld	W	D	L	GF	GA	GD	Pts
8	Catania	38	15	11	12	50	46	+4	56
9	Inter Milan	38	16	6	16	55	57	−2	54
10	Parma	38	13	10	15	45	46	−1	49
11	Cagliari	38	12	11	15	43	55	−12	47
12	Chievo	38	12	9	17	37	52	−15	45

Source: Serie A, Soccerway
Rules for classification: 1st points; 2nd head-to-head points; 3rd head-to-head goal difference; 4th goal difference; 5th number of goals scored; 6th public draw.
(Head-to-head record is applied for clubs with the same number of points only once all matches between said clubs have been played)

==== Results summary ====
Overall								Home						Away					
Pld	W	D	L	GF	GA	GD	Pts	W	D	L	GF	GA	GD	W	D	L	GF	GA	GD
38	13	10	15	45	46	−1	49	9	6	4	28	18	+10	4	4	11	17	28	−11

Last updated: 19 May 2013.
Source: Competitive matches

==== Results by round ====
Round	1	2	3	4	5	6	7	8	9	10	11	12	13	14	15	16	17	18	19	20	21	22	23	24	25	26	27	28	29	30	31	32	33	34	35	36	37	38
Ground	A	H	A	H	A	H	A	H	A	H	A	H	A	H	A	A	H	A	H	H	A	H	A	H	A	H	A	H	A	H	A	H	A	H	H	A	H	A
Result	L	W	L	D	D	D	L	W	W	W	L	D	D	W	L	L	W	W	W	D	D	L	L	D	L	L	L	W	L	W	D	L	L	D	W	W	L	W
Position	14	13	13	12	13	14	14	12	7	6	8	8	9	7	8	11	10	8	8	9	9	10	10	10	11	12	13	12	13	10	10	11	14	13	10	10	10	10

Source: legaseriea.it
A = Away; H = Home; W = Win; D = Draw; L = Loss

==== Matches ====
25 August 2012 1	Juventus	2 – 0	Parma	Turin
20:45 CET	Lichtsteiner 54'; Pirlo 58'	Report		Stadium: Juventus Stadium; Attendance: 37,771; Referee: Andrea Romeo

2 September 2012 2	Parma	2 – 0	Chievo	Parma
20:45 CET	Belfodil 32'; Rosi 86'	Report		Stadium: Stadio Ennio Tardini; Attendance: 9,909; Referee: Davide Massa

16 September 2012 3	Napoli	3 – 1	Parma	Stadio San Paolo, Naples
15:00 CET	Cavani 2' (pen.); Pandev 39'; Insigne 77'	Report	44' Parolo	Attendance: 31,133; Referee: Andrea Gervasoni

15 September 2012 4	Parma	1 – 1	Fiorentina	Stadio Ennio Tardini, Parma
17:00 CET	Valdés 90+3' (pen.)	Report	20' Roncaglia	Attendance: 12,980; Referee: Paolo Valeri

26 September 2012 5	Genoa	1 – 1	Parma	Stadio Luigi Ferraris, Genoa
20:45 CET	Borriello 88' (pen.)	Report	27' Lucarelli	Attendance: 17,511; Referee: Marco Guida

29 September 2012 6	Parma	1 – 1	Milan	Stadio Ennio Tardini, Parma
17:00 CET	Galloppa 66'	Report	50' El Shaarawy	Attendance: 14,239; Referee: Gianluca Rocchi

7 October 2012 7	Catania	2 – 0	Parma	Stadio Angelo Massimino, Catania
15:00 CET	Gómez 2'; Bergessio 80'	Report		Attendance: 11,470; Referee: Gianpaolo Calvarese

21 October 2012 8	Parma	2 – 1	Sampdoria	Stadio Ennio Tardini, Parma
15:00 CET	Amauri 36' (pen.), 53'	Report	81' (pen.) Éder	Attendance: 14,603; Referee: Sebastiano Peruzzo

28 October 2012 9	Torino	1 – 3	Parma	Stadio Olimpico, Turin
15:00 CET	Basha 90+2'	Report	Sansone 72'; Amauri 73'; Rosi 88'	Attendance: 11,676; Referee: Piero Giacomelli

31 October 2012 10	Parma	3 – 2	Roma	Stadio Ennio Tardini, Parma
20:45 CET	Belfodil 34'; Parolo 37'; Zaccardo 65'	Report	8' Lamela; 71' (pen.) Totti	Attendance: 12,077; Referee: Antonio Damato

4 November 2012 11	Pescara	2 – 0	Parma	Stadio Adriatico, Pescara
11:30 CET	Abbruscato 49'; Weiss 90+3'	Report		Attendance: 14,467; Referee: Davide Massa

11 November 2012 12	Parma	0 – 0	Siena	Stadio Ennio Tardini, Parma
15:00 CET		Report		Attendance: 10,611; Referee: Domenico Celi

18 November 2012 13	Udinese	2 – 2	Parma	Stadio Friuli, Udine
15:00 CET	Di Natale 9'; Pereyra 50'	Report	46' Marchionni; 89' Palladino	Attendance: 17,860; Referee: Carmine Russo

26 November 2012 14	Parma	1 – 0	Internazionale	Stadio Ennio Tardini, Parma
20:00 CET	Sansone 75'	Report		Attendance: 15,966; Referee: Luca Banti

2 December 2012 15	Lazio	2 – 1	Parma	Stadio Olimpico, Rome
15:00 CET	Biava 25'; Klose 34'	Report	66' Belfodil	Attendance: 27,220; Referee: Marco Guida

8 December 2012 16	Atalanta	2 – 1	Parma	Stadio Atleti Azzurri d'Italia, Bergamo
17:00 CET	4' Denis; 38' Peluso	Report	45' Amauri	Attendance: 12,948; Referee: Gianpaolo Calvarese

16 December 2012 17	Parma	4 – 1	Cagliari	Stadio Ennio Tardini, Parma
15:00 CET	Belfodil 21', 86'; Biabiany 54'; Valdés 65' (pen.)	Report	19' Sau	Attendance: 11,066; Referee: Emilio Ostinelli

22 December 2012 18	Bologna	1 – 2	Parma	Stadio Renato Dall'Ara, Bologna
15:00 CET	Sørensen 54'	Report	56' Valdés; 66' Sansone	Referee: Carmine Russo

6 January 2013 19	Parma	2 – 1	Palermo	Stadio Ennio Tardini, Parma
15:00 CET	Belfodil 62'; Amauri 90+1'	Report	85' Budan	Attendance: 10,387; Referee: Daniele Doveri

13 January 2013 20	Parma	1 – 1	Juventus	Stadio Ennio Tardini, Parma
15:00 CET	Sansone 78'	Report	52' Pirlo	Attendance: 19,277; Referee: Andrea De Marco

20 January 2013 21	Chievo	1 – 1	Parma	Stadio Marc'Antonio Bentegodi, Verona
15:00 CET	Paloschi 56'	Report	40' Belfodil	Referee: Gianpaolo Calvarese

27 January 2013 22	Parma	1 – 2	Napoli	Stadio Ennio Tardini, Parma
15:00 CET	Cannavaro 74' (o.g.)		Hamšík 20'; Cavani 85'	Attendance: 14,000; Referee: Gianluca Rocchi

3 February 2013 23	Fiorentina	2 – 0	Parma	Stadio Artemio Franchi, Florence
15:00 CET	Toni 27'; Jovetić 50'			Attendance: 23,000; Referee: Carmine Russo

10 February 2013 24	Parma	0 – 0	Genoa	Stadio Ennio Tardini, Parma
12:30 CET				Attendance: 14,000; Referee: Sebastiano Peruzzo

15 February 2013 25	Milan	2 – 1	Parma	Milan
15:00	Paletta 39' (o.g.); Balotelli 78'		Sansone 90+3'	Stadium: San Siro; Attendance: 33,077; Referee: Davide Massa

24 February 2013 26	Parma	1 – 2	Catania	Stadio Ennio Tardini, Parma
15:00 CET	Amauri 87'		Lodi 5'; Keko 44'	Attendance: 14,000; Referee: Piero Giacomelli

3 March 2013 27	Sampdoria	1 – 0	Parma	Stadio Luigi Ferraris, Genoa
15:00 CET	Icardi 58'			Attendance: 22,489; Referee: Paolo Valeri

10 March 2013 28	Parma	4 – 1	Torino	Stadio Ennio Tardini, Parma
15:00 CET	Amauri 77', 84', 90+1'; Sansone 80'		Santana 56'	Attendance: 14,000; Referee: Maurizio Mariani

17 March 2013 29	Roma	2 – 0	Parma	Stadio Olimpico, Rome
19:45	Lamela 7'; Totti 70'			Attendance: 38,000; Referee: Carmine Russo

31 March 2013 30	Parma	3 – 0	Pescara	Stadio Ennio Tardini, Parma
15:00 CET	Benalouane 18'; Paletta 52'; Amauri 65'			Attendance: 10,546; Referee: Marco Di Bello

7 April 2013 31	Siena	0 – 0	Parma	Stadio Artemio Franchi, Siena
15:00 CET				Attendance: 9,000; Referee: Mauro Bergonzi

14 April 2013 32	Parma	0 – 3	Udinese	Stadio Ennio Tardini, Parma
15:00 CET			Muriel 12', 43'; Pereyra 62'	Attendance: 13,000; Referee: Filippo Merchiori

21 April 2013 33	Internazionale	1 – 0	Parma	San Siro, Milan
15:00 CET	Rocchi 81'			Attendance: 42,572; Referee: Antonio Damato

28 April 2013 34	Parma	0 – 0	Lazio	Stadio Ennio Tardini, Parma
15:00 CET				Attendance: 13,000; Referee: Giampaolo Calvarese

5 May 2013 35	Parma	2 – 0	Atalanta	Stadio San Paolo, Naples
15:00 CET	Parolo 44'; Biabiany 58'			Attendance: 13,000; Referee: Piero Giacomelli

8 May 2013 36	Cagliari	0 – 1	Parma	Stadio Is Arenas, Quartu Sant'Elena
15:00 CET			Rosi 80'	Attendance: 9,000; Referee: Michael Fabbri

12 May 2013 37	Parma	0 – 2	Bologna	Stadio Ennio Tardini, Parma
15:00 CET			Taïder 7'; Moscardelli 76'	Attendance: 22,000; Referee: Aleandro di Paolo

19 May 2013 38	Palermo	1 – 3	Parma	Stadio Renzo Barbera, Palermo
15:00 CET	Miccoli 76'		Gobbi 38'; Valdés 41'; Belfodil 45+1'	Attendance: 18,000; Referee: Diego Roca

=== Coppa Italia ===
12 December 2012 Round of 16	Parma	1–1 (3–4 p)	Catania	Parma
16:30	Pabón 10'		30' (pen.) Lodi	Stadium: Stadio Ennio Tardini; Attendance: 2,601; Referee: Davide Massa
	Penalties
	Pabón (penalty scored); Marchionni (penalty scored); Parolo (penalty missed); Ninis (penalty scored); Paletta (penalty missed)		(penalty missed) Barrientos; (penalty scored) Álvarez; (penalty scored) Lodi; (penalty scored) Bergessio; (penalty scored) Marchese

== Statistics ==
=== Appearances and goals ===
No.	Pos	Nat	Player	Total		Serie A		Coppa Italia	
No.	Pos	Nat	Player	Apps	Goals	Apps	Goals	Apps	Goals
Goalkeepers
1	GK	(Italy) ITA	Nicola Pavarini	7	0	5+1	0	1	0
83	GK	(Italy) ITA	Antonio Mirante	33	0	33	0	0	0
91	GK	(Slovakia) SVK	Pavol Bajza	1	0	0+1	0	0	0
Defenders
3	DF	(Uruguay) URU	Emilio MacEachen	0	0	0	0	0	0
5	DF	(Algeria) ALG	Djamel Mesbah	7	0	3+4	0	0	0
6	DF	(Italy) ITA	Alessandro Lucarelli	32	1	30+2	1	0	0
13	DF	(Italy) ITA	Fabiano Santacroce	9	0	4+4	0	0+1	0
18	DF	(Italy) ITA	Massimo Gobbi	35	1	33+1	1	1	0
28	DF	(Tunisia) TUN	Yohan Benalouane	22	1	18+3	1	1	0
29	DF	(Argentina) ARG	Gabriel Paletta	36	1	35	1	1	0
31	DF	(Italy) ITA	Andrea Coda	8	0	6+2	0	0	0
87	DF	(Italy) ITA	Aleandro Rosi	26	3	23+3	3	0	0
Midfielders
2	MF	(Peru) PER	Álvaro Ampuero	5	0	4+1	0	0	0
4	MF	(Italy) ITA	Stefano Morrone	3	0	1+2	0	0	0
8	MF	(Italy) ITA	Daniele Galloppa	12	1	8+4	1	0	0
10	MF	(Chile) CHI	Jaime Valdés	30	4	28+1	4	1	0
14	MF	(Sierra Leone) SLE	Rodney Strasser	2	0	0+2	0	0	0
15	MF	(Kenya) KEN	McDonald Mariga	2	0	1+1	0	0	0
16	MF	(Italy) ITA	Marco Parolo	37	3	34+2	3	1	0
32	MF	(Italy) ITA	Marco Marchionni	29	1	25+3	1	0+1	0
77	MF	(Greece) GRE	Sotiris Ninis	15	0	5+9	0	1	0
Forwards
7	FW	(France) FRA	Jonathan Biabiany	34	2	29+4	2	1	0
9	FW	(Algeria) ALG	Ishak Belfodil	34	8	22+11	8	0+1	0
11	FW	(Italy) ITA	Amauri	34	10	26+7	10	1	0
17	FW	(Italy) ITA	Raffaele Palladino	8	1	0+8	1	0	0
19	FW	(Italy) ITA	Filippo Boniperti	2	0	0+2	0	0	0
21	FW	(Italy) ITA	Nicola Sansone	26	6	17+9	6	0	0
23	FW	(Venezuela) VEN	Manuel Arteaga	0	0	0	0	0	0
Players transferred out during the season
5	DF	(Italy) ITA	Cristian Zaccardo	16	1	14+1	1	1	0
19	MF	(Italy) ITA	Gianluca Musacci	6	0	5+1	0	0	0
88	FW	(Colombia) COL	Dorlan Pabón	13	1	5+7	0	1	1

Last updated: 26 May 2013
Source: Competitions

=== Goalscorers ===
This includes all competitive matches. The list is sorted by shirt number when total goals are equal.

R	No.	Pos	Nat	Name	Serie A	Coppa Italia	Total
1	11	FW	(Italy)	Amauri	10	0	10
2	9	FW	(Algeria)	Ishak Belfodil	8	0	8
3	21	FW	(Italy)	Nicola Sansone	6	0	6
4	10	MF	(Chile)	Jaime Valdés	4	0	4
5	16	MF	(Italy)	Marco Parolo	3	0	3
=	87	DF	(Italy)	Aleandro Rosi	3	0	3
7	7	FW	(France)	Jonathan Biabiany	2	0	2
8	5	DF	(Italy)	Cristian Zaccardo	1	0	1
=	6	DF	(Italy)	Alessandro Lucarelli	1	0	1
=	8	MF	(Italy)	Daniele Galloppa	1	0	1
=	17	FW	(Italy)	Raffaele Palladino	1	0	1
=	18	DF	(Italy)	Massimo Gobbi	1	0	1
=	28	DF	(France)	Yohan Benalouane	1	0	1
=	29	DF	(Argentina)	Gabriel Paletta	1	0	1
=	32	MF	(Italy)	Marco Marchionni	1	0	1
=	88	FW	(Colombia)	Dorlan Pabón	0	1	1

Last updated: 23 February 2013
Source: Competitions

== Transfers ==
The dates given below relate to the date on which registration for the 2012–13 season was deposited to Serie A. The summer transfer window runs from 1 July 2012 until 31 August 2012. Non-EU signings, which are limited to 2 for this season in Serie A and comprise the new registration of those who are not EU or EFTA nationals signed from non-Italian clubs, are marked in yellow.

On 21 June 2012, the first significant move of Parma's summer was announced: top scorer and Italian international Sebastian Giovinco re-joined Juventus, who already owned half of the player's registration, in a €11 million deal. Parma's share of Fabio Borini, previously co-owned but plying his trade with Roma, was bought out by the Rome club for €4.9 million on 23 June. On 28 June, the club announced the first of a duo forward replacements when Colombian striker Dorlan Pabón became a Parma player. Four days later, Brazilian-Italian forward Amauri rejoined the club on a two-year deal. He had been out of contract with former club Fiorentina and netted seven times in 11 appearances in a short spell on loan at Parma in 2011.

The club French defender Yohan Benalouane in late August on a year-long loan deal. This was followed by the loan signing of Venezuelan youngster Manuel Arteaga, who was at Zulia.

In January, Parma and Feyenoord agreed to a €3 million deal to make Graziano Pellè's move to the Dutch side permanent.

=== In ===
Date	Pos.	Name	From	Type of Transfer	Fee
22 March 2012	GK	(Slovakia) Pavol Bajza	(Slovakia) Dubrica	Full ownership	Free
22 March 2012	MF	(Greece) Sotiris Ninis	(Greece) Panathinaikos	Full ownership	Free
5 June 2012	GK	(Italy) Matteo Pisseri	(Italy) Renate	Half to full ownership	Undisclosed
20 June 2012	DF	(Italy) Andrea Rossi	(Italy) Siena	Co-ownership	Undisclosed
22 June 2012	DF	(Italy) Angelo Bencivenga	(Italy) Pro Vercelli	Half to full ownership	Undisclosed
22 June 2012	FW	(Italy) Gabriele Paonessa	(Italy) Bologna	Half to full ownership	Undisclosed
22 June 2012	DF	(Italy) Paolo Dellafiore	(Italy) Novara	Half to full ownership	Undisclosed
22 June 2012	DF	(Italy) Fabio Lebran	(Italy) AlbinoLeffe	Half to full ownership	€200,000
22 June 2012	DF	(Italy) Makris Petrozzi	(Italy) Pergocrema	Half to full ownership	Free
22 June 2012	DF	(Italy) Luca Tedeschi	(Italy) Crotone	Half to full ownership	Undisclosed
25 June 2012	DF	(Finland) Jonas Portin	(Italy) Padova	Co-ownership	Undisclosed
26 June 2012	FW	(Italy) Alessandro Iacobucci	(Italy) Siena	Co-ownership	Undisclosed
26 June 2012	DF	(Italy) Giuseppe Pacini	(Italy) Siena	Co-ownership	Undisclosed
28 June 2012	MF	(Italy) Nicola Del Pivo	(Italy) Cesena	Co-ownership	Undisclosed
28 June 2012	DF	(Italy) Riccardo Casini	(Italy) Bologna	Co-ownership	Undisclosed
28 June 2012	GK	(Italy) Andrea Rossini	(Italy) Cesena	Co-ownership	Undisclosed
29 June 2012	FW	(Italy) Mauro Cioffi	(Italy) Crotone	Co-ownership	Undisclosed
29 June 2012	DF	(Italy) Lorenzo Pasqualini	(Italy) Ascoli	Co-ownership	Undisclosed
29 June 2012	DF	(Italy) Nicolò Belotti	(Italy) Brescia	Co-ownership	Undisclosed
30 June 2012	DF	(Italy) Matteo Gaudiano	(Italy) Fondi	Full ownership	Undisclosed
2 July 2012	FW	(Italy) Mattia Sprocati	(Italy) Pavia	Full ownership	Undisclosed
2 July 2012	FW	(Algeria) Ishak Belfodil	(France) Lyon	Full ownership	€2,500,000
4 July 2012	DF	(Italy) Michele Bentoglio	(Italy) Sarnico	Full ownership	Undisclosed
4 July 2012	MF	(Belgium) Floriano Vanzo	(Belgium) Tubize	Full ownership	Undisclosed
4 July 2012	MF	(Italy) Emiliano Storani	(Italy) Sambenedettese	Full ownership	Undisclosed
4 July 2012	FW	(Colombia) Dorlan Pabón	(Colombia) Atlético Nacional	Full ownership	€4,000,000
5 July 2012	DF	(Italy) Fabiano Santacroce	(Italy) Napoli	Co-ownership	Undisclosed
5 July 2012	GK	(Italy) Marco D'Arsiè	(Italy) Ancona	Full ownership	Undisclosed
9 July 2012	MF	(France) Jonathan Biabiany	(Italy) Sampdoria	Co-ownership	€3,500,000
13 July 2012	DF	(Portugal) Gonçalo Brandão	(Italy) Cesena	Co-ownership	Undisclosed
13 July 2012	GK	(Italy) Mirko Pigliacelli	(Italy) Roma	Full ownership	Free
13 July 2012	FW	(Italy) Nicolò Dallaglio	(Italy) Fidenza	Full ownership	Undisclosed
13 July 2012	MF	(Chile) Jaime Valdés	(Portugal) Sporting CP	Full ownership	€1,800,000
17 July 2012	MF	(Italy) Gianluca Musacci	(Italy) Empoli	Co-ownership	€500,000
17 July 2012	FW	(Italy) Amauri	(Italy) Fiorentina	Full ownership	Free
20 July 2012	MF	(Italy) Mattia Musi	(Italy) Atletico Piacenza	Full ownership	Undisclosed
26 July 2012	MF	(Italy) Davide Mazzocco	(Italy) Montebelluna	Full ownership	Undisclosed
28 July 2012	MF	(Italy) Salvatore Sandomenico	(Italy) Arzanese	Full ownership	Undisclosed
31 July 2012	FW	(Italy) Gian Piero Tozzi	(Italy) Monterotondo	Full ownership	Undisclosed
July 2012	DF	(Uruguay) Emilio MacEachen	(Uruguay) Peñarol	Full ownership	€300,000
2 August 2012	MF	(Italy) Vittorio Fabris	(Italy) Vicenza	Full ownership	Undisclosed
2 August 2012	DF	(Italy) Simone Ciboldi	(Italy) Como	Full ownership	Undisclosed
8 August 2012	DF	(Italy) Aleandro Rosi	(Italy) Roma	Full ownership	Free
10 August 2012	FW	(Italy) Daniele Bazzoffia	(Italy) Gubbio	Full ownership	Undisclosed
10 August 2012	FW	(Italy) Simone Smacchia	(Italy) Gubbio	Full ownership	Undisclosed
10 August 2012	FW	(France) Brice Bonelli	(France) Marseille	Full ownership	Undisclosed
17 August 2012	MF	(Ghana) Raman Chibsah	(Italy) Juventus	Co-ownership	€750,000
20 August 2012	FW	(Italy) Stefano Okaka	(Italy) Roma	Full ownership	Free
23 August 2012	FW	(Italy) Diego De Giorgi	(Italy) Casarano	Full ownership	Undisclosed
23 August 2012	MF	(Romania) Samuel Ferau	(Romania) Avicola	Full ownership	Free
23 August 2012	MF	(Italy) Giuseppe Perrino	(Italy) Ebolitana	Full ownership	Free
28 August 2012	MF	(Italy) Andrea Sabatelli	(Italy) Venezia	Full ownership	Free
31 August 2012	GK	(Italy) Francesco Sollo	(Italy) Neapolis Mugnano	Full ownership	Undisclosed
31 August 2012	DF	(Italy) Francesco Pambianchi	(Italy) SPAL	Half to Full ownership	Free
31 August 2012	DF	(Cameroon) Solomon Enow	(Italy) Spezia	Full ownership	Free
31 August 2012	MF	(Hungary) Sebestyén Ihrig-Farkas	(Hungary) Honvéd	Full ownership	Undisclosed
31 August 2012	MF	(Italy) Federico Meacci	Free agent	Full ownership	Free
14 September 2012	MF	(Italy) Marco Marchionni	Free agent	Full ownership	Free
4 January 2013	MF	(Italy) Vincenzo Giannusa	Free agent	Full ownership	Free
11 January 2013	GK	(Italy) Matteo Cincilla	Internazionale	Full ownership	Undisclosed
17 January 2013	MF	(Italy) Gianluca Musacci	(Italy) Empoli	Half to full ownership	€600,000
31 January 2013	MF	(Italy) Luca Fiordiani	(Italy) Foligno	Co-ownership	€75,000

=== Out ===
Date	Pos.	Name	From	Type of Transfer	Fee
15 June 2012	FW	(Italy) Gianluca Lapadula	(Italy) Cesena	Co-ownership	Undisclosed
21 June 2012	FW	(Italy) Sebastian Giovinco	(Italy) Juventus	Half to full ownership	€11,000,000
22 June 2012	DF	(Italy) Ronny Valerio	(Italy) Renate	Half to full ownership	Undisclosed
22 June 2012	DF	(Italy) Andrea Gasparri	(Italy) Fondi	Half to full ownership	Undisclosed
22 June 2012	FW	(Italy) Daniele Paponi	(Italy) Bologna	Half to full ownership	Undisclosed
22 June 2012	DF	(Italy) Andrea Talignani	(Italy) Virtus Entella	Half to full ownership	Undisclosed
23 June 2012	FW	(Italy) Fabio Borini	(Italy) Roma	Half to full ownership	€4,900,000
23 June 2012	DF	(Guinea) Mohamed Traoré	(Italy) Foggia	Half to full ownership	Undisclosed
28 June 2012	FW	(France) Grégoire Defrel	(Italy) Cesena	Co-ownership	Undisclosed
29 June 2012	MF	(Italy) Davide Colomba	(Italy) Ascoli	Co-ownership	Undisclosed
3 July 2012	FW	(Italy) Francesco Finocchio	(Italy) Bologna	Co-ownership	Undisclosed
3 July 2012	DF	(Italy) Abdou Doumbia	(Italy) Siena	Co-ownership	Undisclosed
3 July 2012	DF	(Italy) Alberto Galuppo	(Italy) Siena	Co-ownership	Undisclosed
6 July 2012	DF	(Italy) Paolo Hernan Dellafiore	(Italy) Siena	Co-ownership	Undisclosed
9 July 2012	DF	(Italy) Paolo Castellini	(Italy) Sampdoria	Full ownership	Undisclosed
9 July 2012	MF	(Morocco) Abderrazzak Jadid	(Italy) Grosseto	Full ownership	Undisclosed
9 July 2012	DF	(Italy) Matteo Mantovani	(Italy) Crotone	Co-ownership	Undisclosed
9 July 2012	GK	(Italy) Stefano Russo	(Italy) Brescia	Co-ownership	Undisclosed
14 July 2012	MF	(Italy) Francesco Valiani	(Italy) Siena	Full ownership	€500,000
20 July 2012	FW	(Italy) Riccardo Capogna	(Italy) Chieti	Co-ownership	Undisclosed
27 July 2012	DF	(Guinea) Mohamed Traoré	(Italy) Crotone	Co-ownership	Undisclosed
28 July 2012	DF	(Italy) Andrea Pappaianni	(Italy) Alessandria	Full ownership	Undisclosed
9 August 2012	DF	(Italy) Nicola Russo	(Italy) Nocerina	Co-ownership	Undisclosed
17 August 2012	GK	(Italy) Francesco Anacoura	(Italy) Juventus	Co-ownership	Undisclosed
5 January 2013	FW	(Italy) Graziano Pellè	(Italy) Feyenoord	Full ownership	€3,000,000

=== Loan in ===
Date from	Date to	Pos.	Name	From	Fee
16 July 2012	30 June 2013	MF	(Ghana) Afriyie Acquah	(Italy) Palermo	€100,000
18 July 2012	30 June 2013	DF	(Argentina) Ignacio Fideleff	(Italy) Napoli	€200,000
23 July 2012	30 June 2013	MF	(Italy) Marco Parolo	(Italy) Cesena	€1,000,000
17 August 2012	30 June 2013	GK	(Italy) Francesco Anacoura	(Italy) Juventus	Free
20 August 2012	30 June 2013	DF	(France) Yohan Benalouane	(Italy) Cesena	Free
31 August 2012	30 June 2013	FW	(Venezuela) Manuel Arteaga	(Venezuela) Zulia	Free
16 January 2013	30 June 2013	FW	(Italy) Leandro Campagna	(Italy) Frosinone	Free

=== Loan out ===
Date from	Date to	Pos.	Name	From	Fee
22 June 2012	30 June 2013	DF	(Italy) Angelo Bencivenga	(Italy) Pro Vercelli	Undisclosed
28 June 2012	30 June 2013	DF	(Italy) Niccolò Galli	(Italy) Padova	Undisclosed
28 June 2012	30 June 2013	DF	(Italy) Rolf Feltscher	(Italy) Padova	Undisclosed
28 June 2012	30 June 2013	DF	(Finland) Jonas Portin	(Italy) Padova	Undisclosed
29 June 2012	30 June 2013	DF	(Italy) Lorenzo Pasqualini	(Italy) Ascoli	Undisclosed
29 June 2012	30 June 2013	MF	(Portugal) Danilo Pereira	(Italy) Roda JC	Undisclosed
3 July 2012	30 June 2013	DF	(Italy) Andrea Rispoli	(Italy) Padova	Undisclosed
3 July 2012	30 June 2013	DF	(Nigeria) Nwankwo Obiora	(Italy) Padova	Undisclosed
3 July 2012	30 June 2013	DF	(Brazil) Zé Eduardo	(Italy) Padova	Undisclosed
3 July 2012	30 June 2013	FW	(Italy) Mattia Sprocati	(Italy) Reggiana	Undisclosed
5 July 2012	30 June 2013	MF	(Italy) Emiliano Storani	(Italy) Renate	Undisclosed
5 July 2012	30 June 2013	DF	(Italy) Michele Bentoglio	(Italy) FeralpiSalò	Undisclosed
6 July 2012	30 June 2013	DF	(Italy) Lorenzo Crisetig	(Italy) Spezia	Undisclosed
7 July 2012	30 June 2013	GK	(Italy) Alberto Gallinetta	(Italy) FeralpiSalò	Undisclosed
7 July 2012	30 June 2013	MF	(Italy) Cristian Pedrinelli	(Italy) FeralpiSalò	Undisclosed
7 July 2012	30 June 2013	MF	(Italy) Alessandro De Vitis	(Italy) Padova	Undisclosed
10 July 2012	30 June 2013	DF	(Portugal) Mário Rui	(Italy) Spezia	Undisclosed
10 July 2012	30 June 2013	DF	(Italy) Fabio Lebran	(Italy) Perugia	Undisclosed
10 July 2012	30 June 2013	MF	(Italy) Marco Firenze	(Italy) Pontedera	Undisclosed
12 July 2012	11 January 2013	MF	(Italy) Nicola Del Pivo	(Italy) Como	Undisclosed
16 July 2012	30 June 2013	FW	(Italy) Nicolò Dallaglio	(Italy) Pontedera	Undisclosed
16 July 2012	30 June 2013	DF	(Portugal) Gonçalo Brandão	(Italy) Cesena	Undisclosed
18 July 2012	30 June 2013	FW	(Bosnia and Herzegovina) Milan Đurić	(Italy) Cremonese	Undisclosed
19 July 2012	30 June 2013	DF	(Italy) Andrea Rossi	(Italy) Cesena	Undisclosed
20 July 2012	30 June 2013	DF	(Italy) Matteo Mantovani	(Italy) Chieti	Undisclosed
20 July 2012	30 June 2013	DF	(Italy) Abel Gigli	(Italy) Chieti	Undisclosed
20 July 2012	30 June 2013	FW	(Italy) Diego Mella	(Italy) San Marino	Undisclosed
20 July 2012	10 January 2013	MF	(Italy) Paolo Beatrizzotti	(Italy) Santarcangelo	Undisclosed
23 July 2012	9 January 2013	MF	(Italy) Mattia Musi	(Italy) Santarcangelo	Undisclosed
25 July 2012	30 June 2013	FW	(Italy) Paolo Martino	(Italy) Ancona	Undisclosed
26 July 2012	30 June 2013	FW	(Italy) Alessandro Elia	(Italy) Arzanese	Undisclosed
27 July 2012	30 June 2013	MF	(Ghana) Bright Addae	(Italy) Crotone	Undisclosed
28 July 2012	30 June 2013	MF	(Italy) Salvatore Sandomenico	(Italy) Arzanese	Undisclosed
3 August 2012	30 June 2013	FW	(Italy) Daniel Ciofani	(Italy) Gubbio	Undisclosed
6 August 2012	10 January 2013	DF	(Hungary) Zsolt Pataki	(Italy) Virtus Lanciano	Undisclosed
8 August 2012	3 January 2013	GK	(Italy) Mirko Pigliacelli	(Italy) Sassuolo	Undisclosed
10 August 2012	30 June 2013	DF	(Italy) Luca Tedeschi	(Italy) Cremonese	Undisclosed
17 August 2012	30 June 2013	MF	(Italy) Gianmaria Cucurnia	(Italy) Spezia	Undisclosed
17 August 2012	30 June 2013	MF	(Ghana) Raman Chibsah	(Italy) Sassuolo	Undisclosed
20 August 2012	30 June 2013	FW	(Italy) Stefano Okaka	(Italy) Spezia	Undisclosed
22 August 2012	30 June 2013	MF	(Italy) Francesco Lunardini	(Italy) San Marino	Undisclosed
22 August 2012	30 June 2013	MF	(Italy) Vittorio Fabris	(Italy) FeralpiSalò	Undisclosed
23 July 2012	30 June 2013	MF	(Italy) Jacopo Galimberti	(Italy) Gubbio	Undisclosed
23 August 2012	30 June 2013	FW	(Italy) Diego De Giorgi	(Italy) Fondi	Undisclosed
31 August 2012	30 June 2013	MF	(Ghana) Godfred Adofo	(Romania) Cluj	Undisclosed
31 August 2012	30 June 2013	FW	(Italy) Daniele Bazzoffia	(Italy) Gubbio	Free
31 August 2012	30 June 2013	DF	(Italy) Francesco Pambianchi	(Italy) Gubbio	Free
31 August 2012	30 June 2013	MF	(Ivory Coast) Yves Benoit Bationo	(Italy) Brescia	Undisclosed
31 August 2012	30 June 2013	DF	(Italy) Francesco Modesto	(Italy) Spezia	Undisclosed
31 August 2012	30 June 2013	FW	(Italy) Graziano Pellè	(Netherlands) Feyenoord	Undisclosed
31 August 2012	30 June 2013	FW	(Italy) Simone Malatesta	(Italy) Carrarese	Undisclosed
31 August 2012	30 June 2013	DF	(Italy) Nicolò Belotti	(Italy) Carrarese	Undisclosed
31 August 2012	30 June 2013	FW	(Italy) Mauro Cioffi	(Italy) Renate	Undisclosed
31 August 2012	30 June 2013	DF	(Italy) Thomas Fabbri	(Italy) Santarcangelo	Undisclosed
31 August 2012	30 June 2013	DF	(Montenegro) Irfan Šahman	(Italy) Crotone	Undisclosed
31 August 2012	30 June 2013	DF	(Italy) Federico Meacci	(Italy) Bellaria	Undisclosed
31 August 2012	1 January 2013	MF	(Sweden) David Löfquist	(Sweden) Malmö	Undisclosed
4 January 2013	30 June 2013	MF	(Italy) Vincenzo Giannusa	(Italy) Fondi	Free
10 January 2013	30 June 2013	FW	(Italy) Samuele Marinucci	(Italy) Arezzo	Free
12 January 2013	30 June 2013	FW	(Italy) Manuel La Rosa	(Italy) Savona	Free
12 January 2013	30 June 2013	FW	(Italy) Alessio Aracu	(Italy) Savona	Free
12 January 2013	30 June 2013	DF	(Italy) Tommaso Cancelloni	(Italy) Savona	Free
18 January 2013	30 June 2013	MF	(Italy) Gianluca Musacci	(Italy) Spezia	€200,000
31 January 2013	30 June 2013	MF	(Italy) Luca Fiordiani	(Italy) Foligno	Undisclosed
31 January 2013	30 June 2013	DF	(Italy) Federico Meacci	(Italy) Gavorrano	Undisclosed
