= Andrea Rossini =

Italian footballer (born 1990)

Personal information
- Date of birth: 17 January 1990 (age 36)
- Place of birth: Santarcangelo di Romagna, Italy
- Height: 1.87 m (6 ft 2 in)
- Position: Goalkeeper

Team information
- Current team: La Fiorita
- Number: 96

Youth career
- –2008: Cesena

Senior career*
Years	Team	Apps	(Gls)
2007–2009	Cesena	5	(0)
2008–2009	→ Ivrea (loan)	29	(0)
2009–2011	Foligno	57	(0)
2011–2012	Cesena	0	(0)
2011–2012	→ Frosinone (loan)	0	(0)
2012–2015	Parma	0	(0)
2012	→ Cesena (loan)	0	(0)
2012–2013	→ Bellaria (loan)	26	(0)
2013–2014	→ Cesena (loan)	5	(0)
2014–2015	→ Lupa Roma (loan)	6	(0)
2015	→ Savona (loan)	16	(0)
2015–2016	Reggiana	0	(0)
2016–2017	Ancona	5	(0)
2017	→ Santarcangelo (loan)	0	(0)
2017–2018	Castelvetro Calcio	32	(0)
2018–2019	Cattolica		
2019–2021	Carpi	22	(0)
2022	Legnago	0	(0)
2025-	La Fiorita	0	(0)

International career
2008	Italy U19	3	(0)
- * Club domestic league appearances and goals as of 12 February 2025

Andrea Rossini (born 17 January 1990) is an Italian professional footballer who plays as a goalkeeper for Campionato Sammarinese di Calcio club La Fiorita.

== Club career ==
=== Cesena and Ivrea ===
Born in Santarcangelo di Romagna, the province of Rimini, Emilia-Romagna, Rossini started his professional career at Romagna club A.C. Cesena. In the 2007–08 Serie B season, in which the team was relegated, he played five times as understudy of Gianluca Berti and later Artur; Rossini also played three times for the reserve. In the 2008–09 season he moved down one division to Ivrea; on loan as the first choice goalkeeper of Cesena was fellow youth-product Nicola Ravaglia. While on loan, Rossini was the first choice in 2008–09 Lega Pro Seconda Divisione for the Piedmontese club, but Ivrea folded at the end of season despite finishing mid-table. Rossini's parent club Cesena was promoted back to 2009–10 Serie B and both Ravaglia and Rossini left the club.

=== Foligno ===
Rossini was signed by Foligno Calcio in a co-ownership deal for €500. Rossini was the starting keeper in both 2009–10 and 2010–11 Lega Pro Prima Divisione seasons. He was one of the players in the 2–2 draw with Pistoiese relegation playoff and Foligno escaped relegation due to a better regular season result (35 versus 33 points). In June 2011, Cesena bought back Rossini for €150,000 and he signed a four-year contract; his previous contract was set to expire on 30 June 2012.

=== Cesena and Frosinone ===
Rossini returned to Crecesena in June 2011 but left for newly relegated third-division club Frosinone Calcio on 5 August 2011, in a temporary deal with the club having the option to buy half of the registration rights. Rossini was the understudy of Emanuele Nordi and Massimo Zappino. In February 2012, after the closure of winter transfer window, Rossini was allowed to train with home-province club Rimini.

=== Parma ===
In June 2012, a few days before the closure of the 2011–12 financial year of "AC Cesena SpA" and "Parma FC SpA", both clubs made notional swap deals (which also happened in June 2010 and 2011). Cesena received striker Gianluca Lapadula for €1.4 million and Grégoire Defrel for €1.2 million (Rossini was Lapadula's teammate in Ivrea), and Parma signed Rossini for €1.6 million and Nicola Del Pivo for €1 million. All four players were signed in co-ownership deals; Rossini signed a five-year contract.

On 10 July 2012, Rossini received a call-up to pre-season camp, but for Cesena. Although Parma had sold Andrea Gasparri outright, sold Stefano Russo in a co-ownership deal, and loaned out Alberto Gallinetta on 7 July, Rossini still was excluded from the first-team squad of Parma (along with Alessandro Iacobucci) as Parma preferred Pavol Bajza (b. 1991) as their third keeper and youngster Francesco Anacoura (b. 1994) as the fourth choice of the first team (and the first choice of the reserves).

==== Bellaria (loan) ====
Rossini did not have a place in Cesena despite playing once in a friendly, and he returned to the fourth-tier for A.C. Bellaria Igea Marina in August 2012. The co-ownership of Rossini was renewed in June 2013.

==== Cesena (loan) ====
Rossini also received a call-up to Cesena's pre-season camp for 2013–14 Serie B. He was the second-choice keeper of the team after Andrea Campagnolo in the friendlies. Cesena did not, however, assign any shirt number to him. On the eve of the 2013–14 Coppa Italia, Cesena finalised the loan deal of Rossini from Parma and awarded the number 1 shirt to him. Rossini was the first choice in the first round of the cup but remained on the bench in the second round. Rossini also lost his role as deputy in 2013–14 Serie B to new signing Achille Coser. Cesena received €280,000 from Parma as premi di valorizzazione of the loan.

==== Lupa Roma (loan) ====
On 30 July 2014, Rossini was loaned out again, this time to newly promoted Lega Pro club Lupa Roma where Rossini became the deputy of Francesco Rossi. On 8 January 2015, Rossini was signed by Savona and on 25 June 2015 Rossini became a free agent.

=== Reggiana ===
Rossini was signed by Reggiana on 19 August 2015. Rossini was the second-choice goalkeeper behind Simone Perilli.

=== Ancona ===
In summer 2016, Rossini joined Ancona. On 31 January 2017, Rossini joined Santarcangelo on loan, with Andrea Mancini moving the other way to Ancona.

=== Carpi ===
After two seasons in Serie D and Eccellenza, on 2 August 2019 he signed a two-year contract with Serie C club Carpi.

=== Legnago ===
On 12 February 2022, Rossini signed with Legnago in Serie C until the end of the season.

== International career ==
Italy U19/20 Rossini received a call-up to the Italy national under-19 football team in September 2008 from Massimo Piscedda. Piscedda dropped Simone Colombi (b. 1991), Carlo Pinsoglio, and Sergio Viotti, who had all received a call-up for the first training camp. In Moldova, where the 2009 UEFA European Under-19 Football Championship qualification Group 3 matches took place, Rossini beat Filippo Perucchini to become the first-choice goalkeeper, but Italy was eliminated after finishing third in the group. That season he also received call-up from the Italy national under-20 football team coached by Francesco Rocca, both before and after he received his U19 call-up. Rossini entered the training camp in August 2009 and the team qualified for the 2009 FIFA U-20 World Cup in September 2009 as 2008 U19 Euro runner-up; Andrea Gasparri (b. 1989) and Antonio Piccolo (b. 1990) beat the other footballers to become the backup of Vincenzo Fiorillo (b. 1990), who was back from U21 team in the World Youth Cup.

Italy U20C Rossini has failed to play any game at international level since October 2008, and was eventually dropped from the U20 A team. He received a call-up from Lega Pro U20 representative team in September 2009 for a training camp and again in June 2010 for the 2010 Trofeo Dossena tournament where the team beat Internacional's youth side in the finals; Rossini was the first choice in all five matches and backed up by Pasquale Pane. He also won the 2010 Lega Pro Prima Divisione under-21 Tournament with the U21 side of Prima Division Group A (Third Division Group A) in January 2010. The two teams made 10 substitutions in total (6+4) at half time when Rossini was replaced by Luca Vino (b. 1991).
