= Yao Eloge Koffi =

Ivorian footballer

Eloge Yao
Personal information
- Full name: Eloge Koffi Yao Guy
- Date of birth: 20 January 1996 (age 30)
- Place of birth: Akroukro, Ivory Coast
- Height: 1.82 m (6 ft 0 in)
- Position: Centre-back

Team information
- Current team: Virtus Verona

Youth career
- Parma
- 2012–2015: Inter Milan

Senior career*
Years	Team	Apps	(Gls)
2015–2017	Inter Milan	0	(0)
2015–2016	→ Crotone (loan)	30	(1)
2017–2020	Lugano	51	(1)
2021	Reggiana	13	(2)
2021–2025	Hapoel Jerusalem	109	(1)
2026–	Virtus Verona	0	(0)
- * Club domestic league appearances and goals as of 17 March 2026

Eloge Koffi Yao Guy (born 20 January 1996) is an Ivorian professional footballer who plays as a defender for Serie C club Virtus Verona.

== Club career ==
=== Internazionale ===
Born in Akroukro, Ivory Coast, Yao was signed by the Serie A club Inter Milan from Parma in January 2012. The club sold the 50% registration rights of Jacopo Galimberti (€500,000) and Diego Mella (€500,000) for the 50% registration rights of Yao (€1 million). Yao spent the rest of the 2011–12 season with Parma's youth team. He was a member of Inter's under-17 team in 2012–13 season and was promoted to the reserve team in 2013. In June 2013, Yao's co-ownership contract was renewed. Inter also bought back Galimberti and Mella in €1.75 million cash plus the remain 50% rights of Nwankwo Obiora.

In June 2014, Parma bought back Ishak Belfodil for €5.75 million from Inter, with Lorenzo Crisetig (€4.75 million) and Yao (€1 million) moved to Inter outright.

==== Loan to Crotone ====
On 10 July 2015, Yao was signed by the Serie B club Crotone with a season-long loan deal. On 9 August he made his debut for Crotone in the second round of Coppa Italia in a 1–0 home win over Feralpisalò. On 14 August, Yao played in the third round of Coppa Italia as a substitute replacing Giuseppe Zampano in the 87th minute of a 1–0 home win against Ternana. On 7 September, he made his Serie B debut in a 4–0 away defeat against Cagliari. On 26 September, Yao scored his first professional goal in the 92nd minute of a 2–0 away win over Pro Vercelli. On 1 December, he played in the fourth round of Coppa Italia when he was replaced by Jacopo Galli in the 71st minute, in a 3–1 away defeat after extra time against A.C. Milan at San Siro. Yao ended his season-long loan to Crotone with 33 appearances and 1 goal, and at end of the season Crotone finished second in Serie B and was promoted to Serie A

=== Lugano ===
On 21 July 2017, Yao was signed by Swiss Super League side FC Lugano for an undisclosed fee on a two-year contract. On 20 August 2017, Yao mede his debut for Lugano in Swiss Super League as a substitute replacing Steve Rouiller in the 78th minute of a 1–1 away draw against Basel. On 14 September, he made his UEFA Europa League debut with Lugano as a substitute replacing Steve Rouiller in the 46th minute of 2–1 away defeat against Hapoel Be'er Sheva. On 17 September, Yao played his first match in the Schweizer Pokal in the round of 32 in a 1–0 away win over Koniz.

=== Reggiana ===
On 14 January 2021, Yao signed a one-and-a-half-year contract with Serie B club Reggiana.

=== Hapoel Jerusalem ===
On 11 August 2021, Yao signed for Hapoel Jerusalem. On 12 September 2022, he scored his only goal for the club in a 1–0 victory against Beitar Jerusalem, Hapoel's first win in the Jerusalem derby in 31 years.

== Career statistics ==
As of match played 3 May 2025

Appearances and goals by club, season and competition
Club	Season	League			National cup (Note: Includes Coppa Italia, Swiss Cup, Israel State Cup)		Europe		Other		Total	
Club	Season	Division	Apps	Goals	Apps	Goals	Apps	Goals	Apps	Goals	Apps	Goals
Crotone (loan)	2015–16	Serie B	30	1	3	0	—		—		33	1
Internazionale	2016–17	Serie A	0	0	0	0	0	0	—		0	0
Lugano	2017–18	Swiss Super League	11	0	2	0	2 (Note: Appearances in UEFA Europa League)	0	—		15	0
Lugano	2018–19	Swiss Super League	15	1	2	0	0	0	—		17	1
Lugano	2019–20	Swiss Super League	25	0	1	0	5	0	—		31	0
Lugano	Total		51	1	5	0	7	0	0	0	63	1
Reggiana	2020–21	Serie B	13	2	0	0	0	0	—		13	2
Hapoel Jerusalem	2021–22	Israeli Premier League	27	0	1	0	0	0	—		28	0
Hapoel Jerusalem	2022–23	Israeli Premier League	35	1	1	0	—		2 (Note: Appearances in Toto Cup)	0	38	1
Hapoel Jerusalem	2023–24	Israeli Premier League	25	0	2	0	—		5	0	32	0
Hapoel Jerusalem	2024–25	Israeli Premier League	22	0	1	0	—		2	0	23	0
Hapoel Jerusalem	Total		109	1	5	0	—		9	0	123	1
Career total			203	5	13	0	7	0	9	0	232	5
