= Francesco Valiani =

Italian footballer

Personal information
- Date of birth: 29 October 1980 (age 46)
- Place of birth: Pistoia, Italy
- Height: 1.73 m (5 ft 8 in)
- Position: Wide midfielder

Team information
- Current team: Hellas Chiesina

Youth career
- 1999–2000: Pistoiese

Senior career*
Years	Team	Apps	(Gls)
2000–2005	Pistoiese	92	(12)
2000–2001	→ Maceratese (loan)	27	(3)
2001–2002	→ Imolese (loan)	25	(1)
2005–2008	Rimini	92	(9)
2008–2010	Bologna	72	(7)
2010–2012	Parma	75	(1)
2012–2014	Siena	58	(2)
2014–2015	Latina	32	(3)
2015–2017	Bari	52	(4)
2017–2019	Livorno	84	(5)
2019–2022	Pistoiese	76	(7)
2023–	Hellas Chiesina		
- * Club domestic league appearances and goals as of 23 April 2022

Francesco Valiani (born 29 October 1980) is an Italian footballer who plays as a midfielder for an amateur side Hellas Chiesina.

== Career ==
=== Rimini ===
Valiani joined Rimini along with Emmanuel Cascione. Valiani spent two-and-a-half seasons in Serie B with the club.

His final game (and goal) for Rimini was on 2008-01-26 and, ironically, against the team he would join the next week. Bologna won the match 2–1.

=== Bologna ===
Valiani joined Bologna in January 2008 for €2.5 million and helped them to promotion.

On 31 August 2008 he made his Serie A debut by scoring the winning goal in a shocking 2–1 win for Bologna at San Siro against AC Milan.

=== Parma ===
On 29 January 2010 Parma signed the midfielder from Bologna in return for winger Andrea Pisanu on joint ownership deals, both 50% registration rights of the players were tagged for €2.5 million. Valiani signed a 3 1/2-year contract.

With Parma, he often featured as one of the 3 central midfielder in 3–5–2 formation, or one of the midfielder in 4–3–3 formation. On 17 October 2010, he unusually became a wingforward in the 4–3–3 formation. He generally represented the club on the right-hand side of midfield in Franco Colomba's 4–4–2 formation towards the end of the 2010–11 season and was the outfield player with the most appearances over the seasons, playing in all but three matches.

In June 2011 Parma acquired Valiani outright and co-currently Andrea Pisanu jointed Bologna outright. Co-currently Alessandro Elia and Riccardo Pasi returned to their mother club.

Elia was valued an aggressive price of €1.5 million (Note: It made Parma received a financial income of €500,000 as its retained half was increased to €1.5 million but co-currently a financial cost for Bologna as it cannot capture the €500,000 profit) While Pasi's 50% rights was valued an aggressive price of €1.6 million; (Note: It made Parma a financial cost of €600,000 and financial income to Bologna) Valiani cost Parma €2.8 million (Note: It made Parma had a financial cost of €300,000 as the price of the other half had raised from €2.5M to €2.8M but on Bologna side a financial income as a bonus) and co-currently Parma sold Andrea Pisanu outright for €2.5 million. The four deals made Bologna received €200,000 in net.

=== Siena ===
On 14 July 2012, Parma sold Valiani outright to fellow Serie A club Siena for just €100,000. In June and July 2012 Siena and Parma also made cash-less players only swap, namely: Brandão, Iacobucci, Pacini and Rossi of Siena for a total of €5.6 million; Coppola, Dellafiore, Doumbia and Galuppo of Parma also for a total of €5.6 million.

=== Return to Pistoiese ===
On 14 July 2019, he returned to his first club Pistoiese, signing a 2-year contract.
