= Ishak Belfodil =

Algerian footballer (born 1992)

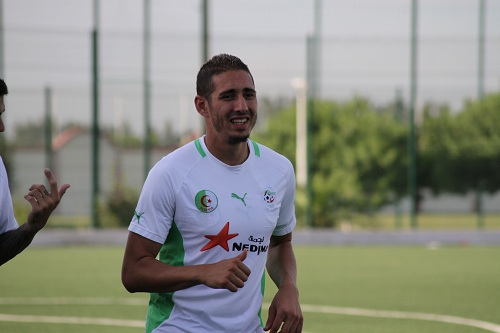
- Belfodil training with Algeria in 2013

Personal information
- Full name: Ishak Lazreg Cherif Belfodil
- Date of birth: 12 January 1992 (age 34)
- Place of birth: Mostaganem, Algeria
- Height: 1.92 m (6 ft 4 in)
- Position: Striker

Youth career
- 1997–2003: Élancourt
- 2003–2005: Trappes Saint-Quentin
- 2005–2006: Paris Saint-Germain
- 2006–2007: Boulogne-Billancourt
- 2007–2008: Clermont
- 2008–2010: Lyon

Senior career*
Years	Team	Apps	(Gls)
2009–2012	Lyon	10	(0)
2010–2011	Lyon B	27	(12)
2012	→ Bologna (loan)	8	(0)
2012–2013	Parma	33	(8)
2013–2014	Inter Milan	8	(0)
2014	→ Livorno (loan)	17	(0)
2014–2015	Parma	23	(1)
2015–2016	Baniyas Club	23	(11)
2016–2018	Standard Liège	35	(14)
2017–2018	→ Werder Bremen (loan)	26	(4)
2018–2021	TSG Hoffenheim	47	(16)
2021–2022	Hertha BSC	26	(5)
2022–2023	Al-Gharafa	18	(6)
2023–2024	Sabah	18	(3)
2025	IMT	14	(4)

International career^{‡}
2008–2009	France U17	3	(0)
2009–2010	France U18	6	(2)
2010–2011	France U19	13	(2)
2011	France U20	2	(1)
2013–	Algeria	19	(2)
- * Club domestic league appearances and goals as of 15 June 2025 ‡ National team caps and goals as of 30 March 2022

Ishak Lazreg Cherif Belfodil (Arabic: اسحاق بلفوضيل; born 12 January 1992) is an Algerian professional footballer who plays as a striker.

== Club career ==
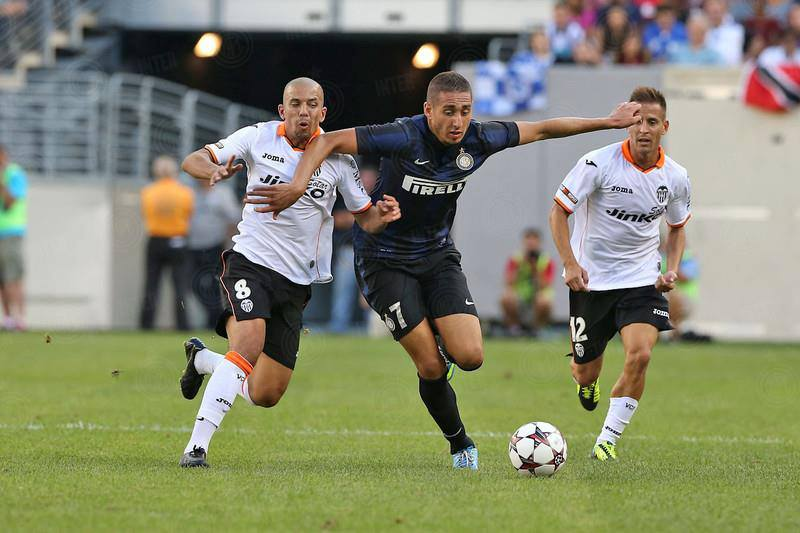
Belfodil in action for Inter Milan

=== Early career ===
Belfodil began his football career at OSC Elancourt, a club located in the western suburbs of Paris, and spent his formative years at the club. He later joined nearby club Trappes FC. While at Trappes, Belfodil passed the entrance tests required to attend the Clairefontaine academy, but was not selected following failure of the final test. As a result, he moved to Paris Saint-Germain spending only a year at the Camp des Loges, the club's training center. Belfodil attributed only one year there primarily due to not focusing on his studies and not receiving enough playing time with his youth section. In 2004, he joined AC Boulogne Billencourt, a sports club that also trained international players Hatem Ben Arfa and Issiar Dia. In 2007, Belfodil secured a move to Ligue 2 club Clermont Foot.

Belfodil spent only a year at Clermont and, while playing with the club under-16 team, scored nine of the team's first 15 goals in the Championnat National under-16 league becoming the top scorer of the league. His play sparked the interest of several clubs, most notably French club Lyon and English clubs Chelsea and Manchester United. On 13 November 2008, Lyon announced that they had acquired Belfodil and he had signed an aspirant (youth) contract with the club until June 2011.

=== Lyon ===
For the duration of the 2008–09 season, Belfodil played on the club's under-18 team. He was a member of the team that reached the 2008–09 Coupe Gambardella semi-finals appearing in six matches scoring two goals. Belfodil also made one appearance on the club's Championnat de France amateur team. In just the third week of the 2009–10 season, he was called up to the senior team for the club's match against Auxerre on 22 August and made his debut in that match coming on as a substitute for Jean-Alain Boumsong in the 85th minute. Lyon won the match 3–0. Belfodil made his UEFA Champions League debut three days later, in the second leg of the club's playoff round match against Anderlecht appearing as a substitute in the 60th minute for Lisandro López. On 16 July 2010, he signed his first professional contract agreeing to a three-year deal until 2014. Due to still having another year left on his aspirant (youth) contract, the contract took effect beginning 1 July 2011.

=== Parma ===
After spending six months on loan at Bologna from January to June 2012, Belfodil signed with Serie A club Parma on 30 June 2012 for €2.5 million plus €600,000 bonuses and 20% profit of future transfer. He had a successful first season with Parma, where he scored eight Serie A goals playing as a striker and left winger.

=== Inter ===
On 5 July 2013, after long negotiations, Belfodil was announced as an Inter Milan player. The transfer involved 50% of Belfodil's economic rights remaining with Parma, while he signed a five-year contract with Inter for a €5.75 million transfer fee. (50% of €11.5 million valuation) On 3 February 2014, FIFA also ruled that Lyon was eligible to receive €1.8 million due to the bonus clause. Belfodil was given the number 7 shirt at Inter. He was officially introduced as an Inter player on 16 July 2013 at the Paladolomiti in Pinzolo in the same press conference as Icardi.

On 22 July 2013, Belfodil scored his first goal for Inter in their 3–1 pre-season triumph over Vicenza; after his initial shot was saved by the goalkeeper, from the subsequent corner in the 42nd minute, Belfodil guided the ball into the net via a powerful header.

After making just eight league appearances in the first half of the 2013–14 Serie A season, all of them as a substitute, Belfodil joined fellow Serie A club Livorno on loan for the remainder of the season on 31 January 2014. At Livorno, Belfodil got a lot more playing time but his form was poor in a side that was ultimately relegated, failing to register a goal or assist in his time there.

=== Return to Parma ===
On 20 June 2014, Parma bought back 50% of Belfodil's contract from Inter so that the Crociati once again owned the entirety of the player's contract. The transfer fee was €5.75 million, despite in a cashless player swaps that involved Lorenzo Crisetig (€4.75 million) and Yao Eloge Koffi (for €1 million). After an ongoing financial crisis of the club which Parma and its intermediate holding company were declared bankrupted in the mid-season, Belfodil terminated his contract with Parma on 6 May 2015, which he waived the club the liability for the unpaid wages, despite the club also suffered from the write-down of the residual value of Belfodil's contract for about €8.25 million.

=== Baniyas ===
On 28 July 2015, Belfodil has officially joined Baniyas Club, signing a two-year contract with the UAE Arabian Gulf League side.

=== Standard Liège ===
On 31 August 2016, Belfodil signed a one-year contract with Belgian club Standard Liège, with an option to extend for another year.

==== Werder Bremen (loan) ====
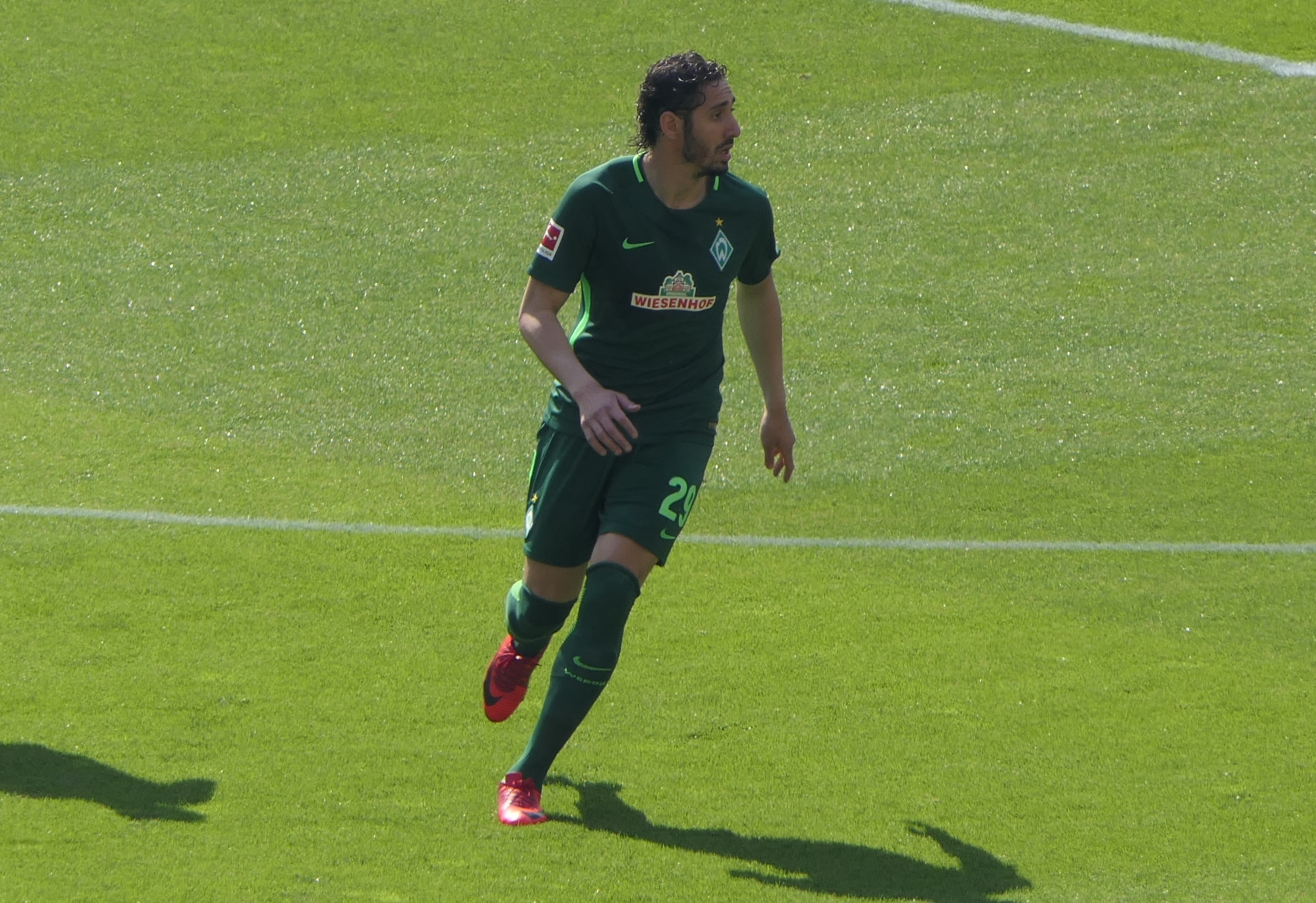
Belfodil in action for Werder Bremen in 2018

On 31 August 2017, the last day of the German summer transfer window, he joined Bundesliga side Werder Bremen on a one-year loan, reportedly for a loan fee of €600,000. Werder Bremen secured an option to sign him permanently, reportedly for a transfer fee of €6.5 million, with sporting director Frank Baumann stating it was in the "single-digit million" range.

=== Hoffenheim ===
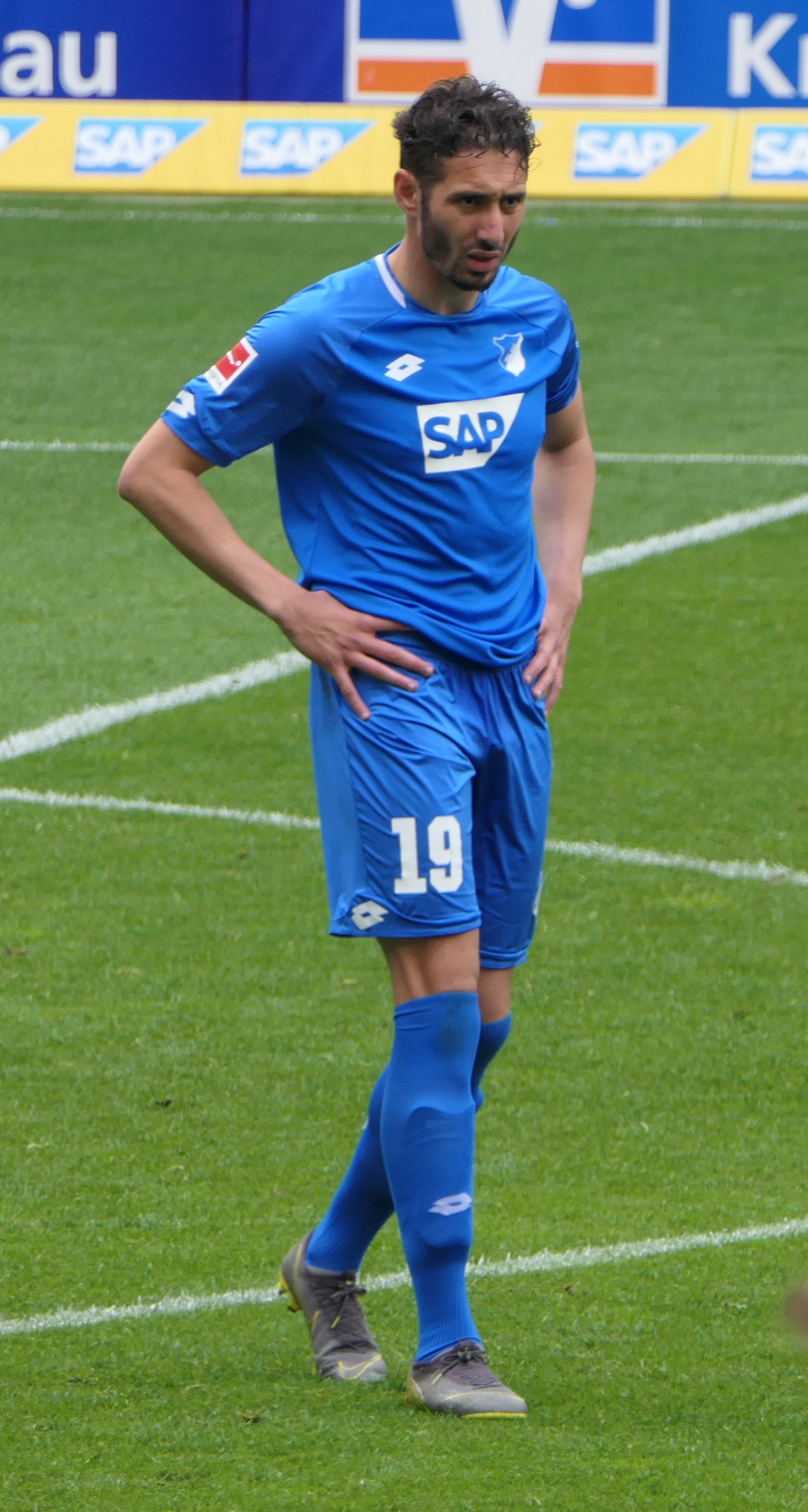
Belfodil with Hoffenheim in 2019

In May 2018, it was announced that Belfodil would join TSG Hoffenheim for the 2018–19 season having signed a contract until 2022 with the club. The transfer fee paid to Standard Liège was reported as €5.5 million.

On 9 February 2019, he scored two goals in a comeback against Dortmund in Bundesliga. Hoffenheim were lagging behind by 3–0, then he scored the first goal in 75th and the equaliser in 87th minute to complete the comeback.

=== Al-Gharafa ===
On 21 August 2022, Belfodil signed a two-year contract with Qatar Stars League side Al-Gharafa.

=== Sabah ===
On 13 September 2023, Azerbaijan Premier League club Sabah announced the signing of Belfodil on a two-year contract, with an option for a further year.

== International career ==
Belfodil is eligible for both France and Algeria. As a youth, he considered Algeria as he was ineligible to represent France as he had not received the French nationality. Belfodil asked his father to inform Algeria of his intention to play for them; however, his inquiries went unnoticed. Following his move to Lyon, the Algerian Football Federation sent an invitation, but Belfodil informed them that it was too late. In 2009, Belfodil was awarded French nationality and was subsequently called up to the under-17 team to participate in the 2009 UEFA European Under-17 Football Championship. He appeared in all three of the team's matches as they suffered group stage elimination.

Belfodil returned to international duty for the 2009–10 season under coach Philippe Bergeroo with the under-18 team. He made his debut for the team on 27 October 2009 in a friendly match against Denmark. On 8 December, he scored his first international youth goal in a 1–1 draw against Ukraine. In 2010, he finished the campaign by scored against Germany at the Cloppenburg Arena in another 1–1 draw. Belfodil remained a cog in the team under coach Bergeroo for under-19 team duty. On 12 September 2010, he scored his first goal with the team in a 2–2 draw with Brazil in the 2010 edition of the Sendai Cup. In first round qualification for the 2011 UEFA European Under-19 Football Championship, he scored the only goal in the team's final group stage match win over Austria.

On 25 August 2012, Belfodil was called up by Vahid Halilhodžić to the Algeria national team for the first time for the 2013 Africa Cup of Nations qualifier against Libya. However, FIFA had not yet processed his allegiance switch to Algeria and his club refused to release him for the game. He was replaced by Mohamed Seguer. On 26 September 2012, FIFA announced that Belfodil's application was processed and he was eligible to represent Algeria.

== Career statistics ==
=== Club ===
As of match played 8 May 2023

Appearances and goals by club, season and competition
Club	Season	League			Cup		Continental		Other		Total	
Club	Season	Division	Apps	Goals	Apps	Goals	Apps	Goals	Apps	Goals	Apps	Goals
Lyon	2009–10	Ligue 1	3	0	0	0	1 (Note: Appearance(s) in UEFA Champions League)	0	—		4	0
Lyon	2010–11	Ligue 1	0	0	0	0	0	0	—		0	0
Lyon	2011–12	Ligue 1	7	0	0	0	2	0	—		9	0
Lyon	Total		10	0	0	0	3	0	—		13	0
Lyon B	2010–11	CFA	23	5	—		—		—		23	5
Lyon B	2011–12	CFA	4	7	—		—		—		4	7
Lyon B	Total		27	12	—		—		—		27	12
Bologna (loan)	2011–12	Serie A	8	0	0	0	—		—		8	0
Parma	2012–13	Serie A	33	8	1	0	—		—		34	8
Inter Milan	2013–14	Serie A	8	0	2	1	—		—		10	1
Livorno (loan)	2013–14	Serie A	17	0	0	0	—		—		17	0
Parma	2014–15	Serie A	23	1	0	0	—		—		23	1
Baniyas Club	2015–16	UAE Pro League	23	11	3	0	—		—		26	11
Standard Liège	2016–17	Belgian First Division A	32	14	0	0	5 (Note: Appearance(s) in UEFA Europa League)	3	—		37	17
Standard Liège	2017–18	Belgian First Division A	3	0	0	0	—		—		3	0
Standard Liège	Total		35	14	0	0	5	3	—		40	17
Werder Bremen (loan)	2017–18	Bundesliga	26	4	3	2	—		—		29	6
TSG Hoffenheim	2018–19	Bundesliga	28	16	2	0	5	1	—		35	17
TSG Hoffenheim	2019–20	Bundesliga	5	0	0	0	—		—		5	0
TSG Hoffenheim	2020–21	Bundesliga	14	0	2	0	4	1	—		20	1
TSG Hoffenheim	Total		47	16	4	0	9	2	—		60	18
Hertha BSC	2021–22	Bundesliga	26	5	2	1	—		2 (Note: Appearance(s) in Bundesliga relegation play-offs)	0	30	6
Al-Gharafa	2022–23	Qatar Stars League	18	6	2	1	—		—		20	7
Sabah	2023–24	Azerbaijan Premier League	0	0	0	0	0	0	—		0	0
Career total			301	77	17	5	17	5	2	0	337	87

=== International ===
Scores and results list Algeria's goal tally first, score column indicates score after each Belfodil goal.

List of international goals scored by Ishak Belfodil
No.	Date	Venue	Opponent	Score	Result	Competition
1	30 March 2015	Jassim Bin Hamad Stadium, Doha	Oman	1–0	4–1	Friendly
2	30 March 2015	Jassim Bin Hamad Stadium, Doha	Oman	4–0	4–1	Friendly
