= Andrea Pisanu =

Italian footballer (born 1982)

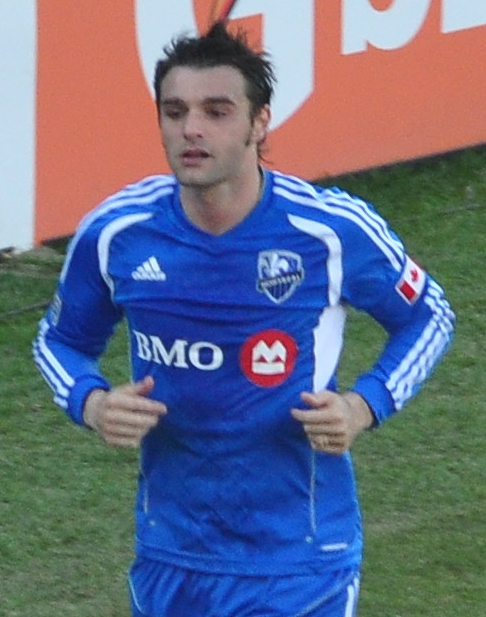
- Pisanu with Montreal Impact

Personal information
- Date of birth: 7 January 1982 (age 44)
- Place of birth: Cagliari, Italy
- Height: 1.80 m (5 ft 11 in)
- Position: Forward

Youth career
- Cagliari

Senior career*
Years	Team	Apps	(Gls)
1998–2001	Cagliari	2	(0)
1999–2000	→ Siena (loan)	11	(0)
2001–2004	Verona	26	(2)
2004	→ Varese (loan)	13	(1)
2004–2010	Parma	82	(8)
2010–2015	Bologna	2	(0)
2011–2012	→ Prato (loan)	23	(11)
2013	→ Montreal Impact (loan)	14	(1)
2014	→ Prato (loan)	10	(2)
2014–2015	→ Sliema Wanderers (loan)	25	(5)
Total		208	(30)

Managerial career
- 2016–2018: Melita
- 2019–2020: Balzan (assistant)
- 2020–2021: Sliema Wanderers
- 2022–2023: Hibernians
- * Club domestic league appearances and goals

Andrea Pisanu (born 7 January 1982) is an Italian football coach and former player.

== Club career ==
Pisanu joined Hellas Verona F.C. from hometown club Cagliari Calcio in February 2001 for 800 million lire (€413,166). He was a member of the reserve team during the 2001–02 season. In June 2002 Verona acquired Pisanu outright from Cagliari. In January 2004 Pisanu left for Varese.

In mid-2004 Pisanu joined Serie A club Parma F.C. along with Alessandro Elia and Marco Fanna. During his 5 1/2 year stay he played an average of 15 games per seasons. He failed to play any game during the 2009–10 Serie A after winning promotion for the club in 2009 as the runner-up of the 2008–09 Serie B.

=== Bologna ===
In January 2010 he joined Bologna in a co-ownership deal, in a direct swap with Francesco Valiani. Both players were valued at €2.5 million for half of the registration rights. It allowed both clubs to make a profit with the move, notably about €3.5 million for Valiani and €4,919,160 for Pisanu. In the same window both clubs also swapped Alessandro Elia and Riccardo Pasi.

In June 2011 Parma acquired Valiani outright and Pisanu jointed Bologna outright. Elia and Pasi also returned to their mother club. Elia was valued an aggressive price of €1.5 million and Pasi's 50% rights were valued at an aggressive price of €1.6 million; Valiani's residual rights for €2.8 million and co-currently sold Pisanu outright for €2.5 million. The four deals netted Bologna €200,000.

In August 2011 Pisanu joined Prato. While with Prato the midfielder had a fine season scoring 11 goals in 23 matches in the third division. In the following season he returned to Bologna. On 3 January 2013, Bologna signed an agreement with Montreal Impact in MLS to loan Pisanu to the Canadian club. In January 2014 Pisanu returned to Prato, as well as in August 2014 to Malta.

=== Malta ===
Pisanu spent one year at Sliema Wanderers from 2014 to 2015.

== Managerial career ==
Pisanu makes alternate use of the 3-4-3 and 4-4-2 system, depending on tactical situations. He is nicknamed "Il colto maltese" (the Cultured from Malta) for his philosophy system, inspired by Marcelo Bielsa, which requires great teamwork and understanding between teammates.

In 2016, following the end of his career as a player, Pisanu was appointed as the coach of Malta Division One team Melita. He left Melita in June 2018 to make room for new head coach Edmond Lufi

After a short spell as assistant coach of Jacques Scerri at Balzan, in February 2020 Pisanu was named head coach of the Maltese Premier League club Sliema Wanderers.

In July 2022 became manager of Hibernians. In December 2022 Andrea Pisanu won his first trophy (Maltese Super Cup) since entering Maltese football. In February 2023 Hibernians FC have announced that they have parted ways with Andrea Pisanu.

== Honours ==
Player

Montreal Impact

- Canadian Championship: 2013

Manager

Hibernians F.C.

- Maltese Super Cup 2023
