= Riccardo Pasi =

Italian ex footballer

Personal information
- Date of birth: 27 August 1990 (age 36)
- Place of birth: Bologna, Italy
- Height: 1.75 m (5 ft 9 in)
- Position: Winger

Team information
- Current team: Delta Rovigo

Youth career
- –2010: Bologna

Senior career*
| Years | Team | Apps | (Gls) |
| 2010–2011 | Parma | 1 | (0) |
| 2010–2011 | → Modena (loan) | 2 | (0) |
| 2011–2015 | Bologna | 6 | (0) |
| 2012 | → Chiasso (loan) | 15 | (1) |
| 2012–2013 | → South Tyrol (loan) | 18 | (3) |
| 2013–2014 | → Santarcangelo (loan) | 25 | (7) |
| 2015 | Cremonese | 11 | (1) |
| 2015–2016 | Imolese | 10 | (1) |
| 2016–2017 | Correggese | 28 | (4) |
| 2017–2018 | Delta Rovigo | 30 | (3) |
| 2018–2019 | Union Feltre | 21 | (6) |
| 2019– | Delta Rovigo | 0 | (0) |
- * Club domestic league appearances and goals

Riccardo Pasi (born 27 August 1990) is an Italian footballer who plays for Delta Rovigo.

== Biography ==
=== Bologna ===
Born in Bologna, Emilia, Pasi started his professional career at Bologna F.C. 1909. He was the member of the reserve from 2006 to 2007 season to the first half of 2009–10 season.

=== Parma ===
In January 2010 Bologna swapped him with Alessandro Elia of Parma in co-ownership deal. Both players' 50% registration rights were "valued" €1 million It made both Emilia clubs had a selling paper profit of about €2 million for both players, but in terms of the contract value of new signing (Elia for Bologna, Pasi for Parma). The profit would compensate by the future amortization and VAT, which Elia and Pasi had both costed Bologna about €650,000 in 1 1/2 years as amortization (around €2 million over 4 years and 5 months times 1 year and 5 months) Both players made a handful appearances for their new clubs.

Pasi made his Serie A debut for Parma F.C. on 18 April 2010 in a game against Genoa C.F.C. when he came on as a substitute in the 80th minute for Luca Antonelli, which is his only appearance for Parma first team. He also played a few games for Parma's reserve, such as the return leg of the round 16 match of the playoffs round. Pasi spent a season with Modena F.C. in 2010–11 Serie B.

=== Return to Bologna ===
The reverse switch happened on 24 June 2011. Elia 50% registration rights was "valued" €1.5 million and Pasi for €1.6 million respectively. (Note: It made Parma received a financial income of €500,000 for Elia as its retained half was increased to €1.5 million but co-currently a financial cost for Bologna as it cannot capture the €500,000 profit; while Pasi's 50% rights was valued €1.6 million, made Parma a financial cost of €600,000 and financial income to Bologna.) In June Parma also bought Francesco Valiani outright for €2.8 million (Note: It made Parma had a financial cost of €300,000 as the price of the other half had raised from €2.5M to €2.8M but on Bologna side a financial income as a bonus.) and co-currently sold Andrea Pisanu outright for €2.5 million. The four deals made Bologna received €200,000 in net. The return of Elia and Pasi made both club received a paper selling profit on both players, for €1.6M and €1.7M respectively for 2010–11 season., but majority in terms of new contract value of Elia (€3M) and Pasi (€3.2M). Furthermore, both club had to amortize the contract value as an intangible asset. As Pasi signed a new 4-year contract, Pasi would cost Bologna €800,000 as amortization (increased from Elia's €450,000) plus wage in 2011–12 and next 3 seasons, but Pasi failed to generate any real benefit nor revenue to the club.

On 16 January 2012 Bologna confirmed his temporary loan to Swiss Challenge League side FC Chiasso. In summer 2012 he was signed by South Tyrol. In summer 2013 he remained in the lower divisions for Santarcangelo.

Pasi finally made his Bologna debut after the club relegated to 2014–15 Serie B.

=== Cremonese ===
As Pasi's contract was due to expire on 30 June 2015, on 15 January 2015 Pasi left for the third division club Cremonese.
