= Abdou Doumbia =

French footballer (born 1990)

Personal information
- Date of birth: 7 June 1990 (age 36)
- Place of birth: Le Blanc-Mesnil, France
- Height: 1.76 m (5 ft 9 in)
- Position: Winger

Team information
- Current team: Polisportiva Real Moretti

Youth career
- Blanc Mesnil Sport Football
- 2006–2007: Paris FC
- 2007–2008: Noisy-le-Sec
- 2008–2009: Pescara

Senior career*
Years	Team	Apps	(Gls)
2008–2009	Pescara	0	(0)
2009–2010	Santegidiese	32	(8)
2010–2012	Parma	0	(0)
2010–2011	→ Atletico Roma (loan)	3	(0)
2011	→ Ascoli (loan)	3	(0)
2011–2012	→ Como (loan)	11	(2)
2012–2013	Siena	0	(0)
2012–2013	→ San Marino (loan)	30	(7)
2013–2014	Parma	0	(0)
2013–2014	→ Lecce (loan)	25	(2)
2014–2019	Lecce	85	(17)
2017–2018	→ Livorno (loan)	32	(9)
2019–2020	Reggina	25	(3)
2020–2022	Carrarese	47	(5)
2022–2023	Virtus Entella	5	(0)
2023	Pergolettese	11	(0)
2023–2024	Caravaggio	25	(1)
2024–2025	Caronnese		
2025–2026	Legnano		
2026–	Polisportiva Real Moretti		
- * Club domestic league appearances and goals as of 21:01, 8 October 2026 (UTC)

Abdou Doumbia (born 7 June 1990) is a French footballer who plays as a winger for Polisportiva Real Moretti.

== Career ==
Born in France with French father and Malian mother, Doumbia spent most of his youth career in a suburb of Paris. He started his career with a club in Le Blanc-Mesnil aged eight, and spent a year each in Paris FC and Noisy-le-Sec. Doumbia left for Lega Pro Prima Divisione side Pescara in 2008-09 season. Mainly a player of Berretti team, he made his first team debut on 8 October 2008, a Coppa Italia Lega Pro match that won Celano 4–0. He also played the second match that 3–5 lost to Foggia.

With Pescara, he scored 14 goals for the youth team.

Doumbia played for Serie D side Santegidiese in 2009–10 season, scoring 8 goals, his performance made Serie A side Parma offered him a contract near the end of season.

=== Parma ===
Doumbia formally under contract with Parma on 1 July 2010. In July 2010 he left for Lega Pro Prima Divisione side Atletico Roma on loan for €1,000, along with Gianluca Lapadula (loan), Abel Gigli (co-ownership deal for €500) and Alessio Tombesi (co-ownership deal for €50,000); as part of the deal that Lega Pro Seconda Divisione top-scorer Daniel Ciofani moved to opposite direction in another co-ownership deal for €300,000.

Doumbia made his club debut on 8 August 2010, the opening match of the season. He replaced Francesco Mazzarani at extra time, which Atletico Roma lost 1–2 to Cremonese in the Coppa Italia match.

On 11 January 2011 he was signed by Ascoli on loan for the remainder of the season.

In July 2011, he joined Lega Pro Prima Divisione side Como Calcio on a season-long loan deal.

=== Siena & San Marino ===
In June–July 2012 Parma and Siena made cashless player swap, which saw Parma signed Gonçalo Brandão, Giuseppe Pacini, Andrea Rossi and Alessandro Iacobucci; while Siena signed Doumbia, Alberto Galuppo, Manuel Coppola and Paolo Hernán Dellafiore; both clubs also retained 50% registration rights on their players. 50% registration rights of both Doumbia and Pacini were tagged for €500,000; Doumbia left for San Marino Calcio in temporary deal soon after. In June 2013, the 8 co-ownership deals were renewed.

=== Lecce ===
In July 2013 Doumbia returned to Siena for the pre-season camp. On 30 July he left the camp in order to finalize a new transfer. On 20 August 2013 Doumbia returned to Parma outright for €100,000 (equal to the revenue received by Parma from Iacobucci). On 27 August 2013 Lecce announced the temporary deal of Doumbia, which Lecce also received €260,000 from Parma as premi di valorizzazione. On 30 June 2014 Lecce signed Doumbia outright for €1 million; Parma signed Daniele Casiraghi in the same deal also for €1 million. On 29 August 2016 Doumbia signed a new 2-year contract.

Doumbia spent four seasons at U.S. Lecce, amassing a total of 111 league appearances and 17 league goals.

=== Livorno ===
In July 2017 he moved to Livorno, in the Serie C, on loan.

He returned to Lecce for the 2018-19 season, but was not included in the squad for the Serie B campaign. In January 2019 he moved to Serie C side Reggina on a permanent basis.

=== Carrarese ===
On 21 September 2020, he signed with Carrarese.

=== Entella ===
On 1 September 2022, Doumbia moved to Virtus Entella.

=== Pergolettese ===
On 31 January 2023, Doumbia joined Pergolettese.

=== Caravaggio ===
On 10 November 2023, Doumbia joined Serie D side USD Caravaggio.
