= Yves Benoit Bationo =

Footballer (born 1993)

Yves Bationo
Personal information
- Full name: Yves Benoit Bationo
- Date of birth: 27 December 1993 (age 32)
- Place of birth: N'Guinou, Ivory Coast
- Height: 1.85 m (6 ft 1 in)
- Position: Midfielder

Youth career
- Parma

Senior career*
Years	Team	Apps	(Gls)
2012–2015	Parma	0	(0)
2012–2013	→ Empoli (loan)	3	(0)
2013	→ Perugia (loan)	0	(0)
2014	→ Gorica (loan)	3	(0)
2014	→ Nîmes II (loan)	1	(0)
2015	→ San Marino (loan)	10	(1)
2015–2016	Tottocuoio	0	(0)
2016	→ Savona (loan)	9	(0)
2017–2019	Casertana	0	(0)
2019–2021	Hellas Verona	0	(0)
2020–2021	→ Flamurtari Vlorë (loan)	0	(0)
2021	Portici	0	(0)

International career
2015	Burkina Faso	1	(0)
- * Club domestic league appearances and goals as of 2015-12-19

Yves Benoit Bationo (born 27 December 1993) is a professional footballer who most recently played as a midfielder for Italian club Portici. Born in Ivory Coast, he represents the Burkina Faso national team at international level.

== Career ==
Born in N'Guinou, Bationo was a Parma player, but didn't make his debut for the side; instead he was on loan with a number of clubs, namely, Empoli (Serie B), Perugia (with no appearances), Gorica (Slovenian First League), Nîmes II (Championnat de France amateur 2) and San Marino Calcio (Lega Pro). He was bought by Tuttocuoio on a free transfer, after his contract ran out with Parma.

In January 2016, he was loaned to Savona.

On 23 August 2019, it was confirmed on Lega Serie A's official website, had Bationo had been registered for Hellas Verona from Casertana. However, he was loaned out to Albanian club Flamurtari Vlorë the following day to restart his career after three years without playing any official games.

On 15 April 2021, he joined Italian fourth-tier Serie D club Portici.
