= Francesco Finocchio =

Italian footballer

Personal information
- Full name: Francesco Finocchio
- Date of birth: 30 April 1992 (age 34)
- Place of birth: Caserta, Italy
- Height: 1.78 m (5 ft 10 in)
- Position: Midfielder

Team information
- Current team: Luparense

Senior career*
| Years | Team | Apps | (Gls) |
| 2011–2012 | Parma | 0 | (0) |
| 2011–2012 | → Cremonese (loan) | 1 | (0) |
| 2012 | → Fondi (loan) | 6 | (0) |
| 2012–2013 | Bologna | 0 | (0) |
| 2012–2013 | → FeralpiSalò (loan) | 24 | (4) |
| 2011–2012 | Parma | 0 | (0) |
| 2013–2014 | → Trapani (loan) | 4 | (0) |
| 2014 | → Gorica (loan) | 14 | (2) |
| 2014–2015 | → Pisa (loan) | 27 | (3) |
| 2015–2016 | Pordenone | 10 | (2) |
| 2016 | → Padova (loan) | 11 | (3) |
| 2016–2017 | Pistoiese | 20 | (0) |
| 2017 | Carrarese | 13 | (2) |
| 2017–2019 | Renate | 51 | (1) |
| 2019–2020 | Mantova | 22 | (2) |
| 2020– | Luparense | 8 | (2) |

International career
| 2009 | Italy U17 | 7 | (0) |
| 2009–2010 | Italy U18 | 3 | (0) |
- * Club domestic league appearances and goals as of 7 February 2021

Francesco Finocchio (born 30 April 1992) is an Italian footballer, who is playing for Serie D club Luparense.

== Biography ==
=== Parma ===
Finocchio joined third-tier side Cremonese from Parma on loan in the summer of 2011 in a year-long deal. However, Finocchio endured a frustrating period at the club, playing just 14 minutes of football before January, which eventually saw him move back to Parma early in January 2012. In the same month he left for Fondi.

In June 2012, Finocchio joined Bologna F.C. 1909 with Riccardo Casini moved to opposite direction. Both clubs also retained 50% registration rights. Half of the "card" of Finocchio and Casini were valued €1 million. On 7 July, he left for FeralpiSalò. In June 2013, both Parma and Bologna bought back their youth product for the same price. Finocchio signed a 5-year contract. In July 2013, he was signed by Serie B club Trapani. On 17 January 2014, he returned to Parma after the loan to Trapani was terminated. He then left for Gorica.

On 4 July 2014, he was signed by Pisa in a temporary deal, with an option to sign. Finocchio became a free agent on 25 June 2015.

=== Renate ===
In August 2017 Finocchio was signed by Renate, an ambitious club in the Italian third division.

=== Mantova ===
On 20 August 2019, he moved to Mantova.

=== Luparense ===
On 11 December 2020, he joined Serie D club Luparense.

=== International career ===
Finocchio played twice in the 2009 UEFA European Under-17 Football Championship.
