= Vittorio Fabris =

Italian footballer

Personal information
- Date of birth: 22 March 1993 (age 33)
- Place of birth: Valdobbiadene, Italy
- Height: 1.78 m (5 ft 10 in)
- Position: Midfielder

Team information
- Current team: Mestre
- Number: 24

Youth career
- –2012: Vicenza

Senior career*
Years	Team	Apps	(Gls)
2012–2016	FeralpiSalò	106	(3)
2016–2018	Venezia	32	(2)
2018	→ Padova (loan)	10	(0)
2018–2019	Monopoli	28	(0)
2020	Südtirol	0	(0)
2021	Fermana	7	(0)
2021–	Mestre	2	(0)
- * Club domestic league appearances and goals as of 21:30, 6 February 2022 (UTC)

Vittorio Fabris (born 22 March 1993) is an Italian footballer who plays as a midfielder for A.C. Mestre.

== Career ==
Fabris started his career at Vicenza Calcio. He was a player of under-17 team in 2009–10 season, as well as for the reserve team from 2010 to 2012.

In July 2012 he was signed by Parma. He was farmed to FeralpiSalò in temporary deal on 21 August 2012. In June 2013 FeralpiSalò signed Fabris in co-ownership deal for €60,000. Im 2014 FeralpiSalò signed Fabris outright on a two-year contract.

In the summer of 2016 he moved to Venezia which played in the Lega Pro at the time.

On 30 August 2018, he signed a one-year contract with Serie C club Monopoli.

On 31 March 2020 he joined Südtirol until the end of the season.

On 2 March 2021 he signed with Fermana. He left the club at the end of the season. In December 2021, he moved to A.C. Mestre.
