= Vincenzo Giannusa =

Italian footballer and manager

Personal information
- Date of birth: June 1, 1981 (age 45)
- Place of birth: Palermo, Italy
- Height: 1.75 m (5 ft 9 in)
- Position: Midfielder

Youth career
- –2002: Palermo

Senior career*
Years	Team	Apps	(Gls)
2002–2004	Palermo	0	(0)
2002–2003	→ Igea Virtus (loan)	4	(0)
2004–2007	Carrarese	88	(4)
2007–2008	Celano	31	(2)
2008–2009	Cassino	24	(3)
2009–2010	Salernitana	0	(0)
2009–2010	→ Potenza (loan)	20	(0)
2010–2012	Latina	46	(4)
2012–2013	Fano	13	(2)
2013	Parma	0	(0)
2013	→ Fondi (loan)	15	(1)
2013–2014	Arzanese	30	(2)
2014–2015	Aversa Normanna	17	(0)
2015–2016	Vigor Lamezia	22	(0)
2016	Castrovillari	8	(0)
2016–2017	Madre Pietra Daunia	12	(0)
2018	Marsala	0	(0)

Managerial career
- 2018–2019: Marsala
- * Club domestic league appearances and goals

Vincenzo Giannusa (born 1 June 1981) is an Italian professional football coach and a former player.

== Playing career ==
Giannusa moved from Fano to Parma on a free transfer in January 2013 and was immediately loaned out to Fondi.

== Coaching career ==
On 6 December 2018 he was appointed head coach of Serie D club Marsala. After a 1-3 defeat against Cittanovese and only 15 points since the beginning of the season, Giannusa was fired on 4 December 2019.
