= Francesco Anacoura =

Italian footballer (born 1994)

Personal information
- Full name: Joyce Francesco Anacoura
- Date of birth: 1 August 1994 (age 32)
- Place of birth: Milan, Italy
- Height: 1.90 m (6 ft 3 in)
- Position: Goalkeeper

Team information
- Current team: Renate

Youth career
- 2004–2008: Inter Milan
- 2008–2011: Pavia
- 2010–2011: → Parma (loan)
- 2011–2012: Parma
- 2012–2013: Juventus
- 2012–2013: → Parma (loan)

Senior career*
Years	Team	Apps	(Gls)
2013–2017	Juventus	0	(0)
2013–2014	→ Cuneo (loan)	29	(0)
2014–2015	→ Pro Vercelli (loan)	0	(0)
2015	→ Pontedera (loan)	7	(0)
2015–2016	→ Rimini (loan)	24	(0)
2016–2017	→ Casertana (loan)	1	(0)
2017	→ Ancona (loan)	10	(0)
2017–2019	Cova da Piedade	13	(0)
2019–2021	Marítimo	0	(0)
2020–2021	Marítimo B		
2021-2022	Estrela da Amadora	0	(0)
2022–2025	Sestri Levante	91	(0)
2025	Giugliano	2	(0)
2025–2026	Ravenna	28	(0)
2026–	Renate	0	(0)
- * Club domestic league appearances and goals as of 30 April 2026

Joyce Francesco Anacoura (born 1 August 1994) is an Italian professional footballer who plays as a goalkeeper for Serie C Group A club Renate. He also holds Seychellois citizenship as well, making him a dual citizen.

== Career ==
=== Early career ===
Born in Milan, the capital of Lombardy, Anacoura began his career as a player of Lombard club Inter Milan in 2004. He left Inter in 2008, when he played for the under-15 team of Pavia during the 2008–09 and 2009–10 campaigns. In July 2010 Anacoura was signed by Emiglia-Romagna-based club Parma on a temporary deal. The Serie A club later bought Anacoura outright, after he managed to appear in 11 games for the Primavera reserve team of Parma during the 2011–12 season. Alberto Gallinetta was another first choice goalkeeper for the Parma reserve team that season.

Both Anacoura and Gallinetta were signed by Serie A champions Juventus in a multi-player swap-deal in August 2012 and January 2013 respectively. The transfer agreement saw Raman Chibsah and Filippo Boniperti join Parma.

=== Juventus ===
On 17 August 2012, Anacoura was officially swapped with Raman Chibsah of Juventus on a co-ownership deal. The 50% registration rights of the players were each valued at €750,000 as well as both club retained the half "card". Anacoura signed a five-year contract with Juventus, but returned to Parma's youth academy immediately.

During the 2012–13 season, he served primarily as the backup goalkeeper to Matteo Ferrari who played 7 games) and later to Matteo Cincilla for eight matches, after his arrival from Inter Milan in January 2013. Anacoura played eight matches during that season.

In June 2013 the co-ownership deal of Anacoura was renewed, but Chibsah was sold outright to Parma in order to finalize his transfer to Sassuolo. On 19 July 2013, along with Juventus youth goalkeeper Federico Gagliardini, they were signed by Italian fourth-tier club, Piedmontese side Cuneo.

Anacoura made his first-team and professional debut in the first round of the 2013–14 Coppa Italia Lega Pro. Anacoura was the starting keeper in the league and gave the starting position to Gagliardini in the cup matches. He finished the season with 29 league matches and the single cup start during the 2012–13 Lega Pro Seconda Divisione and returned to Juventus on 30 June 2014. In June 2014 the co-ownership was also renewed again.

On 12 July 2014, Anacoura was signed by Serie B newcomer Pro Vercelli on another temporary loan deal; the club also has obtained the option to purchase the player outright following the conclusion of the 2014–15 Serie B season. In January 2015 he was signed by Pontedera in another temporary deal. In June 2015 Juventus acquired the remain 50% registration rights of Anacoura from Parma for free.

On 22 July 2015, Anacoura joined Lega Pro side Rimini on loan from Juventus.

In July 2016 Anacoura joined Casertana. On 19 January 2017 he moved to Ancona.
