= Emilio MacEachen =

Uruguayan footballer (born 1992)

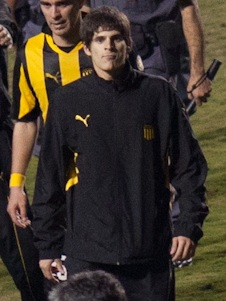

Personal information
- Full name: Washington Emilio MacEachen Vázquez
- Date of birth: 4 May 1992 (age 34)
- Place of birth: Artigas, Uruguay
- Height: 1.83 m (6 ft 0 in)
- Position: Centre-back

Team information
- Current team: Deportivo Riestra

Youth career
- 2006–2011: Peñarol

Senior career*
Years	Team	Apps	(Gls)
2011–2018	Peñarol	40	(2)
2012–2013	→ Parma (loan)	0	(0)
2016	→ Sud América (loan)	5	(0)
2017	→ Necaxa (loan)	4	(0)
2017	→ Atlético San Luis (loan)	15	(0)
2018	→ Oaxaca (loan)	12	(2)
2019	Atlante	0	(0)
2019–2021	Cerro Largo	15	(0)
2021	Rampla Juniors	8	(0)
2022	Santamarina	19	(0)
2023	Deportivo Riestra	4	(0)
2024	Sud América	11	(0)
2024–	Deportivo Riestra	0	(0)
- * Club domestic league appearances and goals as of 28 July 2024

Washington Emilio MacEachen Vásquez (born 4 May 1992) is an Uruguayan professional footballer who plays as a centre-back for Argentine club Deportivo Riestra.

== Life and career ==
Emilio came through the youth system at Uruguay’s most successful club, C.A. Peñarol, and was promoted to the first team in the 2010-11 Primera División season, for which he was assigned squad number 2. He made seven appearances in this season, one of which was as a substitute. His debut came in a 2-0 win against Cerro on 13 March 2011.

Emilio was also a squad member for Peñarol’s 2011 Copa Libertadores campaign, in which the club reached the final. He was an unused substitute in six 2011 Libertadores matches, including the first leg of the final against Santos of Brazil.

On 1 February 2017, Necaxa announced that MacEachen would be joining the club on loan for 6 months with an option to sign permanently. He made his debut on February 15 in a Copa MX group-stage match against Chiapas Jaguar.

== Career statistics ==
As of 25 June 2011

Club statistics
Club	Season	League		National Cup		League Cup		Other		Total	
Club	Season	App	Goals	App	Goals	App	Goals	App	Goals	App	Goals
C.A. Peñarol	2010-11	7	0	0	0	0	0	0	0	7	0
C.A. Peñarol	2011-12	0	0	0	0	0	0	0	0	0	0
Total		7	0	0	0	0	0	0	0	7	0
