= Luca Fiordiani =

Italian footballer

Personal information
- Date of birth: 10 June 1992 (age 34)
- Place of birth: Foligno, Italy
- Position: Midfielder

Team information
- Current team: Bastia

Youth career
- –2005: Perugia Giovane
- 2005–2010: Perugia

Senior career*
Years	Team	Apps	(Gls)
2010–2011	Perugia	14	(0)
2011–2012	Deruta	29	(?)
2012–2013	Foligno	29	(3)
2013–2014	Parma	0	(0)
2013–2014	→ Gavorrano (loan)	18	(0)
2014–2016	Foligno		
2016–	Bastia		
- * Club domestic league appearances and goals as of 7 April 2014

Luca Fiordiani (born 10 June 1992) is an Italian footballer who plays for Bastia.

== Biography ==
Born in Foligno, in the Province of Perugia, Umbria region, Fiordiani started his career at Perugia Giovane. He then joined Perugia Calcio. He was the member of the under-17 team in 2008–09 season. The club folded in 2010. However Fiordiani joined the new company which was admitted in 2010–11 Serie D. Fiordiani left for Deruta in 2011–12 Serie D. He was signed by Lega Pro 2nd Division club Foligno in mid-2012. Fiordiani was signed by Parma on 31 January 2013 in co-ownership deal for €75,000. He immediately returned to Foligno. On 20 June 2013 Parma acquired Fiordiani outright for undisclosed fee. On 14 August 2013 he was signed by Gavorrano along with Matteo Bellucci, Simon Gentili, Federico Meacci and Tiziano Scarfagna.
