= Alessandro Elia =

Italian footballer (born 1990)

Personal information
- Date of birth: 15 February 1990 (age 36)
- Place of birth: Crotone, Italy
- Position: Forward

Youth career
- Verona
- 2004–2009: Parma

Senior career*
Years	Team	Apps	(Gls)
2009–2010	Parma	0	(0)
2009–2010	→ Bellaria (loan)	25	(4)
2010–2011	Bologna	0	(0)
2011–2014	Parma	0	(0)
2011–2012	→ Viareggio (loan)	9	(0)
2012–2013	→ Arzanese (loan)	32	(4)
2013–2014	→ Chieti (loan)	1	(0)
- * Club domestic league appearances and goals

Alessandro Elia (born 15 February 1990) is an Italian footballer.

== Career ==
=== Parma ===
Elia began his career on youth side for Parma F.C. and won with the team the Cup of the Alps, an international Youth Tournament and was named as MVP of the Tournament. However the reserve team failed to enter the playoffs round (round of 16) of 2008–09 Campionato Nazionale Primavera – the reserve league.

In July 2009 Elia left Parma F.C. on loan to A.C. Bellaria Igea Marina who earned his first professional caps.

=== Bologna ===
On 1 February 2010 Bologna F.C. yielded in co-ownership to Parma the half property of the forward and Parma F.C. saved in return of the deal the rights on Bologna's offensive midfielder Riccardo Pasi. Half of the registration rights both tagged for an aggressive price of €1 million. Both clubs also received a paper profit on selling players for nearly €2 million (but counter-weight by VAT), in terms of contract value of the new signing (€2M; Elia for Bologna and Pasi for Parma). Elia returned to Bellaria – Igea Marina in for the rest of 2009–10 Lega Pro Seconda Divisione.

Elia became a financial burden of Bologna in 2010–11 Serie A season. He failed to play any game but the club had to book about €450,000 in 2010–11 season as amortization for the transfer fee. (€2 million over contract length 4 years and 5 months) as worse as wage.

=== Return to Parma ===
On 24 June 2011, he was bought back by Parma; co-currently Pasi returned to Bologna. Elia was valued an aggressive price of €1.5 million (Note: It made Parma received a financial income of €500,000 as its retained half was increased to €1.5 million but co-currently a financial cost for Bologna as it cannot capture the €500,000 profit.) While Pasi's 50% rights was valued an aggressive price of €1.6 million (Note: It made Parma a financial cost of €600,000 and financial income to Bologna). In June Parma also bought Francesco Valiani outright for €2.8 million and co-currently sold Andrea Pisanu outright for €2.5 million. The four deals made Bologna received €200,000 in net. The swap deal made Bologna had a selling profit of about €1.6 million for Elia and about €1.7 million for Pasi in 2010–11 financial year, but majority in terms of increase in intangible asset (New value of Pasi and Elia in accounting, €3.2M and €3M respectively) Yet Elia became a financial burden of Parma. Elia signed a 3-year contract with Parma and Parma had to book €1 million in 2011–12 season (and next 2 seasons) as amortization, increased from Pasi's ~€450,000. In July 2011 Elia left for Viareggio (of third division) in temporary deal and on 31 January 2012 left for fourth division club Arzanese. On 26 July 2012 the temporary deal was renewed.

On 2 September 2013 he was signed by Chieti. However, he only played once. On 2 January 2014 he played a friendly for Cuneo. Chieti announced the left of Elia on 10 January. The paper work of his return to Parma from Chieti was completed on 17 January. However Elia did not completed his move to Cuneo.
