= Pavol Bajza =

Slovak footballer

Personal information
- Full name: Pavol Bajza
- Date of birth: 4 September 1991 (age 35)
- Place of birth: Žilina, Czechoslovakia
- Height: 1.95 m (6 ft 5 in)
- Position: Goalkeeper

Team information
- Current team: FC Nitra
- Number: 91

Youth career
- Považská Bystrica
- 2006–2010: Dubnica

Senior career*
Years	Team	Apps	(Gls)
2010–2012	Dubnica	32	(0)
2012–2015	Parma	4	(0)
2014–2015	→ Crotone (loan)	7	(0)
2015–2016	Zavrč	11	(0)
2016	→ Borčice (loan)	7	(0)
2016–2019	Vejle Boldklub	85	(0)
2019–2020	Olympiakos Nicosia	12	(0)
2020–2022	Slovácko	12	(0)
2022	→ Karviná (loan)	0	(0)
2022–2024	Hradec Králové	31	(0)
2024	→ Viktoria Žižkov (loan)	14	(0)
2024–2025	Železiarne Podbrezová	0	(0)
2025–2026	Tatran Prešov	30	(0)
2025–2026	FC Nitra	0	(0)

International career
2009–2010	Slovakia U19	8	(0)
2010–2012	Slovakia U21	11	(0)
- * Club domestic league appearances and goals as of 25 May 2026

Pavol Bajza (born 4 September 1991) is a Slovak footballer who plays as a goalkeeper for FC Nitra.

== Career ==
Born in Žilina. Bajza began his career with Považská Bystrica, later Pavol joined Dubnica in 2006, aged just 15. After progressing through the Dubnica youth system, Bajza (18 years, 175 days) made his first team debut for MFK Dubnica on 27 February 2010 against MŠK Žilina.

=== Parma ===
On 22 March 2012, Dubnica agreed a fee with Serie A club Parma for Bajza. He had signed a three-year contract with the club, with effect from 1 July 2012. He made his debut for Parma on 19 May 2013 against US Palermo. He replaced Antonio Mirante after 42 minutes.

On 30 July 2014 Bajza left for F.C. Crotone.

=== Hradec Králové ===
On 2 July 2022, Bajza signed a two-year contract with Czech First League club Hradec Králové.

=== Viktoria Žižkov (loan) ===
On 16 February 2024, Hradec Králové loaned Bajza to Viktoria Žižkov until the end of the season.

== Career statistics ==
As of match played 10 December 2017

Appearances and goals by club, season and competition
Club	Season	League			National Cup		Other		Total	
Club	Season	Division	Apps	Goals	Apps	Goals	Apps	Goals	Apps	Goals
Dubnica	2009–10	Superliga	14	0	0	0	—		14	0
Dubnica	2010–11	Superliga	18	0	0	0	—		18	0
Dubnica	Total		32	0	0	0	0	0	32	0
Parma	2012–13	Serie A	1	0	0	0	—		1	0
Parma	2013–14	Serie A	3	0	2	0	—		5	0
Parma	Total		4	0	2	0	0	0	6	0
Crotone (loan)	2014–15	Serie B	7	0	1	0	—		8	0
Zavrč	2015–16	1. SNL	11	0	1	0	—		12	0
Iskra Borčice (loan)	2015–16	2. Liga	7	0	0	0	—		7	0
Vejle	2016–17	1. Division	30	0	0	0	—		30	0
Vejle	2017–18	1. Division	19	0	0	0	—		19	0
Vejle	Total		49	0	0	0	0	0	49	0
Career total			110	0	4	0	0	0	114	0
