= Giuseppe Pacini =

Italian footballer

Personal information
- Date of birth: 17 July 1992 (age 34)
- Place of birth: Civitanova Marche, Italy
- Position: Defender

Youth career
- Marina Picena
- 2007–2011: Siena

Senior career*
Years	Team	Apps	(Gls)
2011–2012	Siena	0	(0)
2011–2012	→ Fondi (loan)	23	(0)
2012–2015	Parma	0	(0)
2012–2013	→ Fondi (loan)	21	(0)
2013–2014	→ Arzanese (loan)	7	(0)
2014–2015	→ Tuttocuoio (loan)	32	(0)
- * Club domestic league appearances and goals

Giuseppe Pacini (born 17 July 1992) is an Italian footballer who plays as a defender.

== Career ==
Born in Civitanova Marche, Pacini started his career at Marina Picena, Porto Sant'Elpidio. In 2007, he was selected to Marche Giovanissimi U15 Representative Team for Coppa Nazionale Primavera. At the end of season he was signed by A.C. Siena and became one of the three youngest player of its Allievi Nazionali U17 team. Pacini was promoted to the reserve in 2008–09 season, and transformed from forward to a midfielder and then a right-back. The team was eliminated by Catania in the first round of 2011 playoffs.

In July 2011 Pacini left the reserve for his first professional team Fondi, where he met his future Parma teammate Zsolt Tamási, Luigi Palumbo and Abel Gigli. Pacini made his professional debut in the first round of 2011–12 Coppa Italia Lega Pro. Pacini made 10 starts in 23 league appearances in 2011–12 Lega Pro Seconda Divisione.

In June–July 2012, Siena made a swap deal with Parma. It saw Pacini along with reserve teammate Alessandro Iacobucci and first teamer Andrea Rossi and Gonçalo Brandão were exchanged with Abdou Doumbia, Alberto Galuppo, Manuel Coppola and Paolo Dellafiore. Pacini signed a 5-year contract. Pacini's loan was also renewed and Parma (along with Ascoli) also loaned Tamási and Palumbo (Cesena–Parma) to Fondi. In June 2014 the co-ownership deal were renewed, with Brandão and Galuppo returned to their mother clubs.

In 2013–14 season he was a player for Arzanese. After the bankruptcy of Siena in July 2014, Parma acquired Rossi and Pacini outright, as well as Coppola and Dellafiore became free agent. Pacini left for Tuttocuoio in another temporary deal for 2014–15 season.
