= Riccardo Casini =

Italian football player

Personal information
- Date of birth: 2 February 1992 (age 34)
- Place of birth: Ferrara, Italy
- Height: 1.74 m (5 ft 8 1/2 in)
- Position: Midfielder

Team information
- Current team: Luparense

Youth career
- –2012: Bologna

Senior career*
Years	Team	Apps	(Gls)
2012	Bologna	0	(0)
2012–2013	Parma	0	(0)
2012–2013	→ Prato (loan)	29	(2)
2013–2015	Bologna	0	(0)
2013–2014	→ Catanzaro (loan)	16	(0)
2014–2015	→ Forlì (loan)	7	(0)
2015	Forlì	16	(0)
2015–2016	Torres	29	(4)
2016	Grosseto	13	(0)
2016–2017	Rieti	16	(0)
2017–2019	Arzachena	68	(1)
2019	Rimini	0	(0)
2019–2024	Arzignano	166	(3)
2024–2025	Torres	19	(1)
2025–	Luparense	0	(0)
- * Club domestic league appearances and goals as of 27 April 2025

Riccardo Casini (born 2 February 1992) is an Italian football player who plays as midfielder for Luparense.

== Career ==
In June 2012 Casini moved from Bologna to Parma in a co-ownership deal, with Francesco Finocchio moved to opposite direction. He then moved to Prato on a year-long loan deal.

In June 2013 Parma bought back Finocchio and Bologna bought back Casini. They both had an accounting value of €2 million for both club on 30 June 2013, which Casini signed a 2-year contract. On 12 July 2013 he was signed by Catanzaro.

On 18 July 2014 he was signed by Forlì in temporary deal. He played his 7th game for the club on 31 January 2015, which his loan was turned to definitive deal on the following days on 2 February.

On 19 July 2017, he was signed by Arzachena.

On 5 July 2019, he signed with Rimini. Before the season started, on 5 August 2019 his Rimini contract was dissolved by mutual consent. The next day, he signed with Arzignano.

On 26 August 2024, Casini returned to Torres.
