= Salvatore Sandomenico =

Italian footballer

Personal information
- Full name: Salvatore Sandomenico
- Date of birth: 21 January 1990 (age 36)
- Place of birth: Naples, Italy
- Height: 1.67 m (5 ft 5 1/2 in)
- Position: Midfielder

Team information
- Current team: Nocerina
- Number: 18

Senior career*
Years	Team	Apps	(Gls)
2008–2013	Arzanese		
2013–2014	Parma	0	(0)
2013	→ Gubbio (loan)	3	(0)
2014	→ Arzanese (loan)	18	(3)
2014–2016	L'Aquila	68	(22)
2016–2018	Juve Stabia	18	(4)
2017	→ Viterbese (loan)	11	(2)
2017–2018	→ Siracusa (loan)	16	(2)
2018	→ Teramo (loan)	13	(2)
2018–2019	Reggina	29	(7)
2019–2020	Cavese	7	(0)
2020	→ Avellino (loan)	4	(0)
2020–2021	Turris	3	(0)
2021–	Nocerina	0	(0)
- * Club domestic league appearances and goals as of 7 February 2021

Salvatore Sandomenico (born 11 January 1990) is an Italian football midfielder. He plays for Nocerina.

== Career ==
On 28 July 2016, he joined Juve Stabia.

On 30 September 2019, he signed a two-year contract with Serie C club Cavese. On 31 January 2020, he joined Avellino on loan.

On 8 August 2020 he moved to Turris.

On 9 February 2021 he signed with Serie D club Nocerina.
