= Diego Mella =

Italian footballer (born 1993)

Personal information
- Date of birth: 1 February 1993 (age 33)
- Place of birth: Milan, Italy
- Position: Forward

Team information
- Current team: Varesina

Youth career
- 2007–2012: Internazionale
- 2012: Parma

Senior career*
Years	Team	Apps	(Gls)
2012–2013	Parma	0	(0)
2012–2013	→ St.Marino (loan)	14	(2)
2013–2015	Internazionale	0	(0)
2013–2014	→ Pro Patria (loan)	24	(1)
2014–2015	→ Pro Piacenza (loan)	13	(0)
2015–2016	Villafranca	27	(4)
2016–2017	Pianese	35	(5)
2018–	Varesina	0	(0)

International career
2009	Italy U16	4	(0)
- * Club domestic league appearances and goals as of 20 February 2018

Diego Mella (born 1 February 1993) is an Italian footballer who plays as a forward for Varesina.

== Career ==
In January 2012, Mella and Jacopo Galimberti moved from Internazionale to Parma in a co-ownership deal, both tagged for €500,000. Co-currently Yao Eloge Koffi joined Inter for €1 million in co-ownership, made the deal pure player swap. Mella spent half-season in Parma's reserve.

The following summer Mella moved to San Marino on a year-long loan deal. On 20 June 2013 Parma acquired Nwankwo outright from Inter for €100,000 (Note: The provision for co-ownership debt was €300,000, Parma received co-ownership income of €200,000 for the different of the actual price and the provision.) and sent Galimberti and Mella back to Milan for €1.85 million in a two-year contract.

On 26 July 2013 Mella was signed by Pro Patria. On 15 July 2014 he was signed by Pro Piacenza.
