= Mauro Cioffi =

Italian footballer (born 1994)

Personal information
- Date of birth: 16 May 1994 (age 32)
- Place of birth: Rome, Italy
- Position: Forward

Team information
- Current team: San Severo

Youth career
- –2012: Crotone

Senior career*
Years	Team	Apps	(Gls)
2012–2014	Parma	0	(0)
2012–2013	→ Renate (loan)	3	(0)
2013–2014	→ Paganese (loan)	12	(0)
2014	→ Vllaznia (loan)	6	(0)
2015	Berane	0	(0)
2015–2016	Roccella	14	(2)
2016	Madre Pietra Daunia	12	(5)
2016–2017	Bisceglie	13	(1)
2017	Chieti	?	(4)
2017–	San Severo	5	(0)
- * Club domestic league appearances and goals as of 6 March 2018

Mauro Cioffi (born 16 May 1994) is an Italian footballer who plays for San Severo.

== Career ==
In the summer of 2012, Cioffi moved from Crotone to Parma in a co-ownership deal. He then moved to Renate on a year-long loan deal. In the season 2013–14 he played on loan with Paganese. In summer 2014 a new loan came, this time abroad, to Albanian Superliga side KF Vllaznia Shkodër. On 22 February 2015, he joined Montenegrin side FK Berane.
