= Pasquale Pane =

Italian footballer

Personal information
- Date of birth: 11 March 1990 (age 36)
- Place of birth: Acerra, Italy
- Height: 1.88 m (6 ft 2 in)
- Position: Goalkeeper

Youth career
- –2008: Monza
- 2008–2009: Cavese

Senior career*
Years	Team	Apps	(Gls)
2008–2011	Cavese	33	(0)
2008–2009	→ Trivento (loan)	6	(0)
2008–2009	→ Pianura (loan)	33	(0)
2011–2013	Barletta	34	(0)
2013–2014	Ischia	15	(0)
2014	Aprilia	13	(0)
2014–2015	Benevento	26	(0)
2015–2016	Mantova	7	(0)
2016–2017	Akragas	34	(0)
2017–2019	Siena	36	(0)
2019	Sicula Leonzio	14	(0)
2019–2020	Picerno	24	(0)
2020–2026	Avellino	38	(0)
2024–2025	→ Altamura (loan)	12	(0)
- * Club domestic league appearances and goals as of 8 May 2026

Pasquale Pane (born 11 March 1990) is an Italian professional footballer who plays as a goalkeeper.

== Career ==
On 28 August 2024, Pane was loaned to Altamura.
