= Jacopo Galimberti =

Italian footballer

Personal information
- Date of birth: 15 June 1993 (age 33)
- Place of birth: Carate Brianza, Italy
- Position: Defender

Team information
- Current team: ASD Pontelambrese

Youth career
- 2001–2012: Inter Milan
- 2012: Parma

Senior career*
Years	Team	Apps	(Gls)
2012–2015	Inter Milan	0	(0)
2012–2013	→ Gubbio (loan)	10	(0)
2013–2014	→ Monza (loan)	15	(0)
2014–2015	→ Savona (loan)	16	(0)
2015–2016	Pro Sesto	17	(0)
2016–2017	Caravaggio	18	(1)
2017	USD CasateseRogoredo		
2017–2018	FBC Saronno		
2018–	ASD Pontelambrese		
- * Club domestic league appearances and goals

Jacopo Galimberti (born 15 June 1993) is an Italian professional footballer who plays as a defender for ASD Pontelambrese.

== Career ==
Born in Carate Brianza, Lombardy, Galimberti started his career at Inter Milan. He had played for Inter since 2001–02 season (in Pulcini B2 team); he played every level in the youth system: Pulcini A in 2003–04 to Esordienti in 2004–05. Since 2005–06 season had played in youth competitive leagues: Lombard Giovanissimi (2005–06 for B team, 2006–07 for A team), National Giovanissimi (2007–08), Lombard Allievi (2008–09), National Allievi (2009–10) and Primavera (2010–12).

Despite not a regular for Inter's Primavera team, in January 2012 he was sold to Parma in co-ownership deal along with Diego Mella for €500,000 each, but Parma only paid Inter by selling Yao Eloge Koffi for a tagged price €1 million also in co-ownership deal. Both clubs registered a player profit of nearly €2 million in the swap deal but only in terms of increase in intangible asset (asset value of the player contract "increased").

Galimberti spent had season with Parma's Primavera team before moved to his first professional team Gubbio on 23 July.

In June 2013, Inter bought back Galimberti and Mella for €1.85 million in a two-year contract; concurrently, Nwankwo Obiora joined Parma outright, for €100,000. (Note: The provision for co-ownership debt was €300,000. Parma received co-ownership income of €200,000 for the difference between the actual price and the provision.)

On 24 July 2013, Galimberti joined Monza in a temporary deal, which the club represents both the city of Monza and the Brianza region, where Galimberti was born.

On 1 August 2014, Savona signed Galimberti and Matteo Colombi from Inter in a temporary deal.

In June 2017, Galimberti joined USD CasateseRogoredo. In December 2017 he then joined FBC Saronno, before joining ASD Pontelambrese in July 2018.
