= Nwankwo Obiora =

Nigerian footballer

Personal information
- Full name: Nwankwo Obiora
- Date of birth: 12 July 1991 (age 35)
- Place of birth: Kaduna, Nigeria
- Height: 1.83 m (6 ft 0 in)
- Position: Defensive midfielder

Team information
- Current team: Anadia
- Number: 4

Youth career
- 2006–2010: ECO
- 2006–2008: → Heartland
- 2008–2009: → Wikki Tourists
- 2009–2010: → Real Murcia

Senior career*
Years	Team	Apps	(Gls)
2010–2011	Inter Milan	4	(0)
2011–2013	Parma	2	(0)
2012	→ Gubbio (loan)	18	(2)
2012–2013	→ Padova (loan)	14	(0)
2013	→ CFR Cluj (loan)	7	(0)
2013–2014	CFR Cluj	11	(0)
2014	Córdoba	6	(0)
2014–2016	Académica	38	(1)
2016–2018	Levadiakos	16	(1)
2018–2020	Boavista	38	(3)
2021–2023	Chaves	37	(1)
2024–2025	Académica	23	(0)
2025–	Anadia	4	(1)

International career^{‡}
2009	Nigeria U-20	4	(1)
2011	Nigeria U-23	4	(0)
2012–2015	Nigeria	8	(0)
Medal record
Men's football
Representing Nigeria
Africa Cup of Nations
Winner	2013 South Africa
- * Club domestic league appearances and goals as of 14 September 2025 ‡ National team caps and goals as of 21 June 2013

Nwankwo Obiora MON (born 12 July 1991) is a Nigerian professional footballer who plays as a defensive midfielder for Campeonato de Portugal club Anadia.

== Club career ==
Obiora began his career with Lagos based club ECO FC, before he signed for Heartland. He was loaned to Wikki Tourists in July 2008.

He then left Heartland to sign a contract with Real Murcia on 11 May 2009 that ran through 30 June 2010.

=== Inter Milan ===
On 28 November 2009, it was announced that Inter Milan signed Obiora from Eco FC. At first the youngster was a part of Inter's primavera squad managed by Fulvio Pea.

Obiora made his first-team debut in a UEFA Champions League match against Tottenham in London, coming on as a substitute for the injured Sulley Muntari in the 53rd minute.

=== Parma ===
After not making an impact at the Milan club, Nwankwo Obiora moved to Parma on 31 January 2011 in a co-ownership deal for €300,000. The deal was renewed in June 2011 and again in June 2012. He was loaned to Calcio Padova in 2012–13 season. Parma subsidized Padova for €200,000 in terms of premi di valorizzazione.

=== CFR Cluj ===
On 6 February 2013, Romanian champions CFR Cluj announced that they brought the midfielder on a temporary basis, with a buyout clause to make the move permanent in the summer. In June 2013 Parma also purchased the remain 50% registration rights of Nwankwo from Inter (as part of the return of Galimberti and Mella to Inter), (Note: The provision for co-ownership debt was €300,000, Parma received co-ownership income of €200,000 for the different of the actual price and the provision.) in order to re-sell the registration rights to Cluj for free.

=== Académica ===
On 23 July 2014, after a small stint with Córdoba in Segunda División, Obiora signed a three-year deal with Primeira Liga side Académica de Coimbra. He made his debut in a 1–1 home draw against Sporting CP. Obiora scored his first goal for Académica on 1 November, in a 1–1 draw against Moreirense.

=== Levadiakos ===
On 15 September 2016, Levadiakos officially announced the signing of Nwankwo.

=== Boavista ===
Obiora signed for Boavista for the 2018–19 season. In March 2019 he talked about how injuries had affected his earlier career.

=== Later career ===
In July 2021, after having spent a year without a club, Obiora joined Liga Portugal 2 club Chaves.

In January 2024, Obiora returned to Académica, competing in Liga 3.

== International career ==
He was a member of the Nigeria U-20 squad which took part at the 2009 FIFA U-20 World Cup in Egypt, the 2009 WAFU U-20 Championship, and the 2009 African Youth Championship in Rwanda.

He was called up to Nigeria's 23-man squad for the 2013 Africa Cup of Nations.

== Honours ==
Inter Milan

- Supercoppa Italiana: 2010
- FIFA Club World Cup: 2010

2013 African Cup of Nations

Nigeria

- Africa Cup of Nations: 2013

Orders

- Member of the Order of the Niger
