= Matteo Cincilla =

Italian footballer (born 1994)

Personal information
- Date of birth: 24 October 1994 (age 32)
- Place of birth: Milan, Italy
- Height: 1.88 m (6 ft 2 in)
- Position: Goalkeeper

Youth career
- 2009–2013: Inter
- 2013: Parma

Senior career*
Years	Team	Apps	(Gls)
2013–2015	Renate	50	(0)
2015–2016	Savona	7	(0)
2016–2019	Renate	77	(0)
2019–2020	Ravenna	13	(0)
- * Club domestic league appearances and goals as of 23 February 2020

Matteo Cincilla (born 24 October 1994) is an Italian professional footballer who plays as a goalkeeper.

== Career ==
Born in Milan, Lombardy, Cincilla was a youth product of Inter.

In May 2012 Cincilla won Berretti league title with the Inter under-18 team. He was named in the squad of 2012–13 UEFA Europa League as List B players. In January 2013 Cincilla left for Parma.

On 5 July 2013 Cincilla (co-ownership), Antonio Santurro (loan), Davide Adorni (loan) and Filippo Lauricella (co-ownership) were transferred to Renate from Parma. Cincilla made his debut in 2013–14 Coppa Italia Lega Pro. He also played the next league cup match. Cincilla played his first game in 2013–14 Lega Pro Seconda Divisione on 19 January 2014. The club promoted to 2014–15 Lega Pro as the runner-up of Group A.

On 14 August 2015 Cincilla was signed by Savona in a 1-year deal.

In the summer of 2016 Cincilla returned to Renate.

On 15 July 2019, he signed a 2-year contract with Ravenna.

== Honours ==
Inter U18

- Campionato Nazionale Dante Berretti: 2012

Inter U19

- Campionato Nazionale Primavera: 2012
- NextGen series: 2012
