= Abel Gigli =

Association football player (born 1990)

Personal information
- Full name: Abel Gigli Mohamed
- Date of birth: 16 August 1990 (age 36)
- Place of birth: Busto Arsizio, Italy
- Height: 1.89 m (6 ft 2 in)
- Position: Centre-back

Team information
- Current team: Zola Predosa

Youth career
- Fagnano
- Roncalli
- 2008–2009: Inveruno
- –2010: Parma

Senior career*
Years	Team	Apps	(Gls)
2010	Parma	1	(0)
2010–2011	Atletico Roma	0	(0)
2010–2011	→ Viareggio (loan)	1	(0)
2011–2015	Parma	0	(0)
2011–2012	→ Fondi (loan)	5	(0)
2012–2013	→ Chieti (loan)	26	(1)
2013–2014	→ Gorica (loan)	17	(0)
2014–2015	→ Crotone (loan)	16	(1)
2015–2016	Maribor	12	(0)
2016–2017	Lupa Roma	19	(1)
2018–2019	Gozzano	36	(1)
2019–2020	Folgore Caratese	7	(0)
2020–2021	Rimini	8	(3)
2021	Cjarlins Muzane	12	(1)
2021	Fano	6	(0)
2021–2022	Folgore Caratese	14	(0)
2022	Ravenna	6	(0)
2022–2024	Correggese	20	(0)
2024–2026	Terre di Castelli		

International career^{‡}
2019–	Somalia	16	(1)
- * Club domestic league appearances and goals as of 25 September 2026 ‡ National team caps and goals as of 25 September 2026

Abel Gigli Mohamed (Somali: Abel Gigli Maxamed; born 16 August 1990) is a professional footballer who plays as a centre back for the Somalia national team. Born in Italy, he plays for the Somalia national team.

== Club career ==
=== Parma ===
Gigli made his Serie A debut for Parma on 25 April 2010 in a game against Bologna when he came on as a substitute in the 43rd minute for Massimo Paci. In mid-2010, he was sold to Atletico Roma on a co-ownership deal.

On 31 August 2010, he joined Viareggio on a temporary deal. He played once in the league and played 3 times in Italian Lega Pro Cup.

He was bought back by Parma on 24 June 2011. In July 2011, he joined Fondi on loan.

On 11 July 2013, Gigli was signed by Savona F.B.C. However, on 1 August he was signed by Slovenian club ND Gorica. The paperwork was completed on 9 August.

On 9 August 2014, he was signed by Serie B club Crotone.

=== Maribor ===
On 1 July 2015, he returned to Slovenia, signing a two-year contract with Maribor. He left the club on 4 February 2016.

=== Lupa Roma ===
On 20 September 2016, Lupa Roma signed Gigli on a free transfer.

=== Gozzano ===
After being without a club for more than six months, Gigli was signed by Gozzano in March 2018. The club won the group stage of 2017–18 Serie D, as well as participated in the playoffs: the Scudetto Dilettanti. Gigli played two out of possible three matches in the playoffs for the losing semi-finalists.

=== Ravenna ===
On 5 July 2022, he moved to Ravenna.

== International career ==
Gigli made his debut for Somalia on 5 September 2019 in a 2022 FIFA World Cup qualification match against Zimbabwe, coming on as the first-half substitute.

== Career statistics ==
=== International ===
Scores and results list Somalia's goal tally first.

#	Date	Venue	Opponent	Score	Result	Competition
1	20 June 2021	Jassim bin Hamad Stadium, Doha, Qatar (Note: All FIFA Arab Cup qualification matches played in Qatar.)	Oman	1–2	1–2	2021 FIFA Arab Cup qualification
