= 2024–25 AC ChievoVerona season =

AC ChievoVerona
2024–25 season
- President: Sergio Pellissier
- Manager: Alessandro Pontarollo (until 7 October); Riccardo Allegretti (from 9 October)
- Stadium: Stadio Aldo Olivieri
- Serie D: 7th
- Coppa Italia Serie D: First round
- Top goalscorer: League: Alessio De Cerchio (14); All: Alessio De Cerchio (14)
Home colours	Away colours	Third colours

The 2024–25 season was the second consecutive season for AC ChievoVerona in the fourth division in Italy. The team also took part in the Coppa Italia Serie D.

== Overview ==
After the club went bankrupt in the summer of 2021, the club was dissolved and thus absent from the professional football scene. In August of the same year, veteran Chievo player Sergio Pellissier established the FC Clivense to revive the club again, where it started from the ninth division. The following year, Clivense won promotion to the fifth division, ending the season with promotion to the Serie D in 2023–24. On 10 May 2024, Clivense succeeded in purchasing the ChievoVerona brand at an auction, with Pellissier paying 300,000 euros for the rights to it. On 27 May, the club conducted a survey for members of Clevense about the name and colors, and it was decided that the club would change its name to AC Chievo Verona and keep the blue and white colors. On May 29, the club confirmed Riccardo Allegretti's departure, concluding their relationship that began in September 2021. On 9 June, Alessandro Pontarello was appointed coach of the team.

On 17 June, Omar Cissè renewed for one season. However, the Blue and Whites agreed to his departure to Caldiero Terme, also in the Serie D, on 18 July.

On 20 June, Chievo finalized the deal for defender Mattia Seno. On 28 June Chievo Verona brought in free agent winger Lorenzo Trillò. On 28 June, Chievo announced the signing of defender Maximiliano Uggè. On 13 July, captain Federico Tobanelli extended his contract for another season. On July 25, it was announced that midfielder Alexander Zodas would continue his career with the team for another season.

On 7 October, after a series of poor results the club agreed to part ways with head coach Alessandro Pontarollo. Two days later they appointed Riccardo Allegretti as the new manager, he return at the club after leading their predecessor FC Clivense from 2021 to 2024.

== Transfers ==
=== In ===
Pos.	Player	Transferred from	Fee	Date	Source
MF	(Equatorial Guinea) Valeriano Nchama	(Italy) Cjarlins Muzane	Undisclosed	1 July 2024	
MF	(Italy) Lorenzo Trillò	Free agent		1 July 2024	
DF	(Italy) Mattia Seno	(Italy) Bassano	Undisclosed	1 July 2024	
DF	(Italy) Maximiliano Uggè		Undisclosed	1 July 2024	
GK	(Italy) Riccardo Tosi	(Italy) Legnago Salus	Undisclosed	1 July 2024	
MF	(Brazil) Paulo Henrique	(Italy) Bassano	Undisclosed	3 July 2024	
MF	(Italy) Alessio De Cerchio	(Italy) Campobasso	Undisclosed	13 July 2024	
DF	(Italy) Nicolò Saramin	(Italy) Liventina Opitergina	Undisclosed	16 July 2024	
MF	(Italy) Giammaria Fiorin	(Italy) Liv Opitergina	Free	17 July 2024	
DF	(Italy) Mattias Bonafede	(Italy) Cjarlins Muzane	Undisclosed	23 July 2024	
MF	(Italy) Vincenzo Bisogno	(Italy) Benevento U19	Undisclosed	24 July 2024	
MF	(Albania) Enriko Deda	(Italy) Cosenza U17	Undisclosed	5 August 2024	
FW	(Italy) Niccolò Romero	(Italy) Campobasso	Undisclosed	9 August 2024	

=== Out ===
Pos.	Player	Transferred from	Fee	Date	Source
DF	(Bosnia and Herzegovina) Stefan Kladar	(Italy) Chions		1 July 2024	
MF	(Senegal) Omar Cissè	(Italy) Caldiero Terme	Undisclosed	18 July 2024	
DF	(Italy) Graham Momodu	(Italy) ACD Oppeano	Loan	29 July 2024	

== Friendlies ==
=== Pre-season ===
3 August 2024 Friendly	ChievoVerona	3–1	Ambrosiana
		Report

8 August 2024 Friendly	ChievoVerona	9–0	Montorio
		Report

21 August 2024 Friendly	Rovigo	2–0	ChievoVerona	Rovigo
18:00		Report		Stadium: Tre Martiri

25 August 2024 Friendly	Treviso	2–1	ChievoVerona	Treviso
17:00		Report		Stadium: Omobono Tenni; Attendance: 0 (behind closed doors)

29 August 2024 Friendly	Sant’Anna d’Alfaedo	0–6	ChievoVerona	Fosse
17:00		Report

== Competitions ==
=== Overall record ===
Competition	First match	Last match	Starting round	Final position	Record							
Competition	First match	Last match	Starting round	Final position	Pld	W	D	L	GF	GA	GD	Win %
Serie D	8 September 2024	4 May 2025	Matchday 1	7th	38	16	9	13	49	37	+12	42.11
Coppa Italia Serie D	1 September 2024		First round	First round	1	0	0	1	0	1	−1	0.00
Total					39	16	9	14	49	38	+11	41.03

Last updated: 7 October 2024
Source: Competitions

=== Serie D ===
==== League table ====
Pos	Team	Pld	W	D	L	GF	GA	GD	Pts	Promotion, qualification or relegation
5	Folgore Caratese	38	20	8	10	66	42	+24	68	Qualification for wild card playoffs
6	Varesina	38	17	13	8	61	44	+17	64	
7	ChievoVerona	38	16	9	13	49	37	+12	57	
8	Pro Sesto	38	13	13	12	45	43	+2	52	
9	Club Milano	38	14	7	17	44	50	−6	49	

Rules for classification:

Pos	Team	Pld	W	D	L	GF	GA	GD	Pts
1	Livorno	2	2	0	0	6	3	+3	6
2	Forlì	2	1	0	1	4	4	0	3
3	Sambenedettese	2	0	0	2	3	6	−3	0

==== Results summary ====
Overall								Home						Away					
Pld	W	D	L	GF	GA	GD	Pts	W	D	L	GF	GA	GD	W	D	L	GF	GA	GD
38	16	9	13	49	37	+12	57	11	4	5	32	19	+13	5	5	8	17	18	−1

Last updated: 30 April 2025.

==== Results by round ====
Round	1	2	3	4	5	6	7	8	9	10	11	12	13	14	15	16	17	18	19	20	21	22	23	24	25	26	27	28	29	30	31	32	33	34	35	36	37	38
Ground	H	A	H	A	A	H	A	H	A	H	A	H	A	H	A	H	A	H	A	A	H	A	H	H	A	H	A	H	A	H	A	H	A	H	A	H	A	H
Result	D	L	W	L	D	L	L	D	L	W	L	W	D	W	D	W	L	W	D	W	W	W	W	W	W	D	D	L	W	L	L	L	W	L	D	W	L	W
Position	9	15	8	14	16	16	18	18	19	17	18	16	17	14	13	11	11	10	10	10	9	8	8	7	6	7	7	7	7	7	7	7	7	7	7	7	7	7

Updated to match(es) played on 12 November 2024. Source:
A = Away; H = Home; W = Win; D = Draw; L = Loss

==== Matches ====
8 September 2024 1	ChievoVerona	1–1	Sangiuliano City	Sona
16:00 CEST (UTC+2)	Fiorin 12'	Report	Cocuzza 45' (pen.)	Stadium: Stadio Comunale; Referee: Vittorio Emanuele Teghille

14 September 2024 2	Pro Palazzolo	1–0	ChievoVerona	Palazzolo sull'Oglio
15:00 CEST (UTC+2)	Boschetti 78'	Report		Stadium: Stadio Comunale; Referee: Davide Galiffi

18 September 2024 3	ChievoVerona	3–0	Fanfulla	Verona
14:30 CEST (UTC+2)	Marchesini 44'; Trillò 82'; Nannelli 84'	Report		Stadium: Stadio Aldo Olivieri; Referee: Clemente Cortese

22 September 2024 4	Breno	2–0	ChievoVerona	Breno
15:00 CEST (UTC+2)	Prandini 15' (o.g.); Minessi 26'	Report		Stadium: Stadio Comunale; Referee: Mattia Maresca

29 September 2024 5	Sant' Angelo	0–0	ChievoVerona	Sant'Angelo Lodigiano
15:00 CEST (UTC+2)		Report		Stadium: Stadio Comunale; Referee: Benito Sacca

2 October 2024 6	ChievoVerona	2–5	Varesina	Verona
14:30 CEST (UTC+2)	Brighenti 51'; Dall’Ara 66'	Report	Cosentino 24'; Sali 27', 75'; Gasparri 48', 63'	Stadium: Stadio Aldo Olivieri; Referee: Francesco Martini

6 October 2024 7	Folgore Caratese	1–0	ChievoVerona	Carate Brianza
15:00 CEST (UTC+2)	Rosa 8'	Report		Stadium: Sportitalia Arena; Referee: Federico Tassano

12 October 2024 8	ChievoVerona	0–0	Desenzano	Verona
15:00 CEST (UTC+2)		Report		Stadium: Stadio Aldo Olivieri; Referee: Alessandro Papagno

19 October 2024 9	Ospitaletto	2–1	ChievoVerona	Ospitaletto
20:00 CEST (UTC+2)	Bakayoko 68'; Cantamessa 71'	Report	Brighenti 63'	Stadium: Stadio Comunale; Referee: Francesco Scarati

23 October 2024 10	ChievoVerona	1–0	Pro Sesto	Verona
14:30 CEST (UTC+2)	Romero 24'	Report		Stadium: Stadio Aldo Olivieri; Referee: Michele Buzzone

27 October 2024 11	Crema	1–0	ChievoVerona	Crema
14:30 CEST (UTC+2)	Akammadu 8'	Report		Stadium: Stadio Giuseppe Voltini; Referee: Matteo Laganaro

3 November 2024 12	ChievoVerona	2–1	Club Milano	Verona
14:30 CEST (UTC+2)	Brighenti 2'; De Cerchio 33'	Report	Capone 75'	Stadium: Stadio Aldo Olivieri; Referee: Gabriele Iurino

10 November 2024 13	Vigasio	0–0	ChievoVerona	Vigasio
14:30 CEST (UTC+2)		Report		Stadium: Stadio Umberto Capone; Referee: Francesco Saffioti

16 November 2024 14	ChievoVerona	3–2	Ciliverghe	Verona
14:30 CEST (UTC+2)	Marchesini 34', 49'; De Cerchio 74'	Report	Boldini 72'; Pelamatti 89'	Stadium: Stadio Aldo Olivieri; Referee: Hamza El Amil

24 November 2024 15	Casatese Merate	0–0	ChievoVerona	Casatenovo
14:30 CEST (UTC+2)		Report		Stadium: Stadio Comunale; Referee: Christian Ferruzzi

1 December 2024 16	ChievoVerona	2–1	Castellanzese	Verona
14:30 CEST (UTC+2)	Colferai 21'; Fiorin 56'	Report	Chessa 65'	Stadium: Stadio Aldo Olivieri; Referee: Mattia Mirri

8 December 2024 17	Magenta	2–1	ChievoVerona	Magenta
14:30 CEST (UTC+2)	Gatelli 49' (pen.); Mascheroni 56'	Report	Brighenti 12'	Stadium: Stadio Comunale; Referee: Roberto Rago

15 December 2024 18	ChievoVerona	2–0	Arconatese	Sona
14:30 CEST (UTC+2)	Colferai 74'; De Cerchio 78' (pen.)	Report		Stadium: Stadio Comunale; Referee: Federico Bruschi

22 December 2024 19	Nuova Sondrio	0–0	ChievoVerona	Sondrio
14:30 CEST (UTC+2)		Report		Stadium: Stadio La Castellina; Referee: Alessio Artini

5 January 2025 20	Sangiuliano City	1–2	ChievoVerona	Verano
14:30 CEST (UTC+2)	Palesi 60'	Report	Colferai 14'; De Cerchio 42'	Stadium: Sportitalia Village; Referee: Gabriele Zangara

11 January 2025 21	ChievoVerona	2–1	Pro Palazzolo	Verona
15:00 CEST (UTC+2)	De Cerchio 3', 46' (pen.)	Report	Bane 57'	Stadium: Stadio Aldo Olivieri; Referee: Gianpasquale Tedesco

15 January 2025 22	Fanfulla	0–2	ChievoVerona	Lodi
17:30 CEST (UTC+2)		Report	Fiorin 18'; De Cerchio 46' (pen.)	Stadium: Stadio Comunale; Referee: Giuseppe Scarpati

19 January 2025 23	ChievoVerona	1–0	Breno	Sona
14:30 CEST (UTC+2)	De Cerchio 64' (pen.)	Report		Stadium: Stadio Comunale; Referee: Alberto Tommaso Vazzano

26 January 2025 24	ChievoVerona	2–1	Sant' Angelo	Sona
14:30 CEST (UTC+2)	Dall'Ara 78'; Uggè 81'	Report	Panatti 83'	Stadium: Stadio Comunale; Referee: Salvatore Fresu

29 January 2025 25	Varesina	2–3	ChievoVerona	Venegono Superiore
14:30 CEST (UTC+2)	Bertoli 65', 66'	Report	Brighenti 42'; Fiorin 47'; De Cerchio 58'	Stadium: Varesina Stadium; Referee: Andrea Paccagnella

2 February 2025 26	ChievoVerona	1–1	Folgore Caratese	Sona
14:30 CEST (UTC+2)	De Cerchio 6'	Report	Ferrandino 48' (pen.)	Stadium: Stadio Comunale; Referee: Michele Piccolo

9 February 2025 27	Desenzano	1–1	ChievoVerona	Desenzano
14:30 CEST (UTC+2)	Camarlinghi 32' (pen.)	Report	Brighenti 29'	Stadium: Stadio Francesco Ghizzi; Referee: Giorgio D'Agnillo

16 February 2025 28	ChievoVerona	1–2	Ospitaletto	Sona
14:30 CEST (UTC+2)	Bakayoko 9' (o.g.)	Report	Baraye 47'; Gritti 80'	Stadium: Stadio Comunale; Referee: Gianluca Toselli

23 February 2025 29	Pro Sesto	0–1	ChievoVerona	Sesto San Giovanni
14:30 CEST (UTC+2)		Report	Paulinho 67' (pen.)	Stadium: Stadio Ernesto Breda; Referee: Giuseppe Merlino

2 March 2025 30	ChievoVerona	0–2	Crema	Sona
14:30 CEST (UTC+2)		Report	Tacconi 48'; Bernardini 52'	Stadium: Stadio Comunale; Referee: Alban Zadrima

9 March 2025 31	Club Milano	2–1	ChievoVerona	Pero
14:30 CEST (UTC+2)	Rankovic 24'; Costa 40'	Report	Colferai 32'	Stadium: Vista Vision Stadium; Referee: Matteo Moncalvo

23 March 2025 32	ChievoVerona	0–1	Vigasio	Verona
14:30 CEST (UTC+2)		Report	Orfeini 90+3'	Stadium: Stadio Aldo Olivieri; Referee: Francesco Passarotti

30 March 2025 33	Ciliverghe	0–3	ChievoVerona	Mazzano
15:00 CEST (UTC+2)		Report	De Cerchio 23', 68' (pen.); Colferai 88'	Stadium: Stadio Cili; Referee: Michele Coppola

6 April 2025 34	ChievoVerona	0–1	Casatese Merate	Sona
15:00 CEST (UTC+2)		Report	Gningue 70'	Stadium: Stadio Comunale; Referee: Lorenzo Spinelli

13 April 2025 35	Castellanzese	1–1	ChievoVerona	Castellanza
15:00 CEST (UTC+2)	Colombo 86'	Report	De Cerchio 59'	Stadium: Stadio Comunale Provasi; Referee: Francesco Comito

17 April 2025 36	ChievoVerona	4–0	Magenta	Sona
15:00 CEST (UTC+2)	Prandini 54'; Paulinho 59'; De Cerchio 75'; Odinelli 77'	Report		Stadium: Stadio Comunale; Referee: Pio Antonio Pascuccio

27 April 2025 37	Arconatese	2–1	ChievoVerona	Arconate
15:00 CEST (UTC+2)	Pelamatti 7'; Menegazzo 15'	Report	Paulinho 76'	Stadium: Stadio Comunale; Referee: Maria Matteo Giallorenzo

4 May 2025 38	ChievoVerona	5–0	Nuova Sondrio	Sona
15:00 CEST (UTC+2)	Colferai 11'; Paulinho 71'; Odinelli 73'; Prandini 75'; Turano 86'	Report		Stadium: Stadio Comunale; Referee: Emanuele Ciaravolo

=== Coppa Italia Serie D ===
1 September 2024 First round	VillaValle	1–0	ChievoVerona	Villa d'Almè
15:00 CEST (UTC+2)	Torri 73'	Report		Stadium: Stadio Comunale; Referee: Marco Schmid
