= 2025–26 AC ChievoVerona season =

AC ChievoVerona
2025–26 season
- President: Pietro Laterza
- Manager: Fabrizio Cacciatore (until 15 December); Marco Didu (from 18 December)
- Stadium: Stadio Aldo Olivieri
- Serie D: 4th
- Coppa Italia Serie D: Second round
- Top goalscorer: League: Rocco Costantino (8); All: Rocco Costantino (9)
Home colours	Away colours	Third colours

The 2025–26 season it's the third consecutive season for AC ChievoVerona in the fourth division in Italy. The team also took part in the Coppa Italia Serie D.

== Overview ==
After finishing 7th in Serie D Group B the previous season, ChievoVerona was once again placed in the same group, playing their sixth championship in Serie D and their tenth overall in the fifth tier. The corporate structure, refounded in 2024 with the name of ChievoVerona based on FC Clivense by former captain Sergio Pellissier and Enzo Zanin, has been enriched since 2025 by a new consortium of investors, with Pietro Laterza taking on the role of President, while Luigi Tavernise takes on the role of vice-president and CEO. Pellissier remains within the company as Honorary President and Head of Technical Affairs, while Zanin joins the board of directors.

The summer preparation of the first team takes place in two moments: from 20 to 30 July the first phase of the training camp in the locality of Sauze d'Oulx, in Val di Susa in Piedmont, while from 1 to 11 August the second phase of the training camp in the locality of Lorica, in Calabria.

On 1 August, following the sudden resignation of coach Riccardo Allegretti, the club signed Fabrizio Cacciatore as their new manager.

On 15 December, following a series of three consecutive defeats, Cacciatore was sacked and replaced by former Pro Palazzolo manager Marco Didu.

== Transfers ==
=== In ===
Date	Pos.	Player	From	Fee	Ref.

=== Out ===
Date	Pos.	Player	From	Fee	Ref.

== Competitions ==
=== Overall record ===
Competition	First match	Last match	Starting round	Final position	Record							
Competition	First match	Last match	Starting round	Final position	Pld	W	D	L	GF	GA	GD	Win %
Serie D	7 September 2025	3 May 2026	Matchday 1	TBD	26	13	4	9	37	35	+2	50.00
Coppa Italia Serie D	31 August 2025	8 October 2025	First round	Second round	2	1	0	1	2	1	+1	50.00
Total					28	14	4	10	39	36	+3	50.00

Last updated: 18 December 2025
Source: Competitions

=== Serie D ===
==== League table ====
Pos	Team	Pld	W	D	L	GF	GA	GD	Pts	Promotion, qualification or relegation
1	Folgore Caratese (C, P)	33	18	11	4	53	26	+27	65	Promotion to Serie C
2	Casatese Merate (Q)	33	15	13	5	48	28	+20	58	Qualification for wild card playoffs
3	ChievoVerona (Q)	33	17	6	10	50	42	+8	57	Qualification for wild card playoffs
4	Milan Futuro	33	15	8	10	52	36	+16	53	Qualification for wild card playoffs
5	Leon	33	14	11	8	44	33	+11	53	Qualification for wild card playoffs

Updated to match(es) played on 26 April 2026. Source:
Rules for classification:
(C) Champions; (P) Promoted; (Q) Qualified for the phase indicated

==== Results summary ====
Overall								Home						Away					
Pld	W	D	L	GF	GA	GD	Pts	W	D	L	GF	GA	GD	W	D	L	GF	GA	GD
26	13	4	9	37	35	+2	43	6	2	5	17	20	−3	7	2	4	20	15	+5

Last updated: 30 April 2025.

==== Results by round ====
Round	1	2	3	4	5	6	7	8	9	10	11	12	13	14	15	16	17	18	19	20	21	22	23	24	25	26	27	28	29	30	31	32	33	34	35	36	37	38
Ground	H	A	A	H	A	H	A	H	A	H	A	H	A	H	A	H	A	A	H	H	A	H	A	H	A	H	A	H	A	H	A	H	A	H	A	H	A	H
Result	W	W	L	W	D	W	W	W	W	D	W	L	W	L	L	L	W	D	D	L	W	W	L	L	L	W												
Position	4	1	4	2	3	2	1	1	1	1	1	1	1	2	3	4	2	3	2	4	2	2	2	3	6	4												

Updated to match(es) played on 15 December 2025. Source:
A = Away; H = Home; W = Win; D = Draw; L = Loss

==== Matches ====
6 September 2025 1	ChievoVerona	2–1	Scanzorosciate	Verona
15:00 CEST (UTC+2)	De Cerchio 49'; Prandini 90+5'	Report	Belloli 54'	Stadium: Stadio Aldo Olivieri; Referee: Nenad Radovanovic

14 September 2025 2	Casatese Merate	1–3	ChievoVerona	Casatenovo
15:00 CEST (UTC+2)	Gningue 15'	Report	Trillò 19'; Visinoni 23'; Ischia 90+3'	Stadium: Stadio Comunale; Referee: Gianluca Toselli

21 September 2025 3	Milan Futuro	3–2	ChievoVerona	Solbiate Arno
15:00 CEST (UTC+2)	Sia 42'; Traorè 53'; Cappelletti 57'	Report	D'Este 12'; De Cerchio 33'	Stadium: Stadio Felice Chinetti; Referee: Davide Ammannati

25 September 2025 4	ChievoVerona	1–0	Virtus CiseranoBergamo	Verona
15:00 CEST (UTC+2)	Steffè 89'	Report		Stadium: Stadio Aldo Olivieri; Referee: Giorgio Previdi

28 September 2025 5	Breno	2–2	ChievoVerona	Breno
15:00 CEST (UTC+2)	Bigolin 14'; Castelli 77'	Report	De Cerchio 6'; Costantino 11'	Stadium: Stadio Carlo e Filippo Tassara; Referee: Andrea Paccagnella

4 October 2025 6	ChievoVerona	1–0	Caldiero	Verona
15:00 CEST (UTC+2)	De Cerchio 90+6' (pen.)	Report		Stadium: Stadio Aldo Olivieri; Referee: Michele Piccolo

12 October 2025 7	Folgore Caratese	1–2	ChievoVerona	Carate Brianza
15:00 CEST (UTC+2)	Tremolada 54' (pen.)	Report	Costantino 3', 45+1'	Stadium: Sportitalia Village; Referee: Giovanni Giannì

18 October 2025 8	ChievoVerona	4–1	Oltrepò	Verona
15:00 CEST (UTC+2)	De Cerchio 24'; Costantino 40', 48'; D'Este 84'	Report	Semenza 80'	Stadium: Stadio Aldo Olivieri; Referee: Samuele Camia

26 October 2025 9	Nuova Sondrio	0–2	ChievoVerona	Sondrio
15:00 CEST (UTC+2)		Report	Visinoni 11' (pen.); De Cerchio 43'	Stadium: Centro Sportivo "La Castellina"; Referee: Tommaso Cifra

1 November 2025 10	ChievoVerona	3–3	Real Calepina	Verona
14:30 CEST (UTC+2)	Paloschi 5'; Jassey 19'; D'Este 84'	Report	Oboe 31'; Freri 32'; Ronzoni 90+4'	Stadium: Stadio Aldo Olivieri; Referee: Marco Pascali

9 November 2025 11	Villa Valle	0–2	ChievoVerona	Villa d'Almè
14:30 CEST (UTC+2)		Report	Visinoni 50'; D'Este 55'	Stadium: Stadio Comunale; Referee: Gennaro Decimo

16 November 2025 12	ChievoVerona	0–3	Brusaporto	Verona
14:30 CEST (UTC+2)		Report	Siani 6'; Piacentini 15'; Seck 82'	Stadium: Stadio Aldo Olivieri; Referee: Marco Tavassi

23 November 2025 13	Vogherese	0–1	ChievoVerona	Voghera
14:30 CEST (UTC+2)		Report	De Steffè 90+1'	Stadium: Stadio Giovanni Parisi; Referee: Andrea Giordani

30 November 2025 14	ChievoVerona	1–2	Varesina	Verona
14:30 CEST (UTC+2)	Costantino 71'	Report	Cavalli 77'; Costantino 82'	Stadium: Stadio Aldo Olivieri; Referee: Federico Bruschi

7 December 2025 15	Castellanzese	1–0	ChievoVerona	Castellanza
15:00 CEST (UTC+2)	Rusconi 8'	Report		Stadium: Stadio Giovanni Provasi; Referee: Mario Leone

14 December 2025 16	ChievoVerona	0–2	Leon	Verona
17:00 CEST (UTC+2)		Report	Bolis 64'; El Kadiri 90+3'	Stadium: Stadio Aldo Olivieri; Referee: Tommaso Bassetti

21 December 2025 17	Pavia	0–2	ChievoVerona	Pavia
14:30 CEST (UTC+2)		Report	Paloschi 10'; Visinoni 84'	Stadium: Stadio Pietro Fortunati; Referee: Federico Tassano

4 January 2026 18	Scanzorosciate	1–1	ChievoVerona	Scanzorosciate
14:30 CEST (UTC+2)	Belloli 41'	Report	Paloschi 27'	Stadium: Stadio Comunale; Referee: Antonio Pio Pascuccio

10 January 2026 19	ChievoVerona	0–0	Casatese Merate	Verona
14:30 CEST (UTC+2)		Report		Stadium: Stadio Aldo Olivieri; Referee: Marco Ferrara

18 January 2026 20	ChievoVerona	1–3	Milan Futuro	Verona
18:00 CEST (UTC+2)	Uggè 50'	Report	Traorè 4', 36' (pen.); Sala 19'	Stadium: Stadio Aldo Olivieri; Referee: Salvatore Montevergine

25 January 2026 21	Virtus CiseranoBergamo	0–2	ChievoVerona	Ciserano
14:30 CEST (UTC+2)		Report	Costantino 32'; Prandini 55'	Stadium: Stadio Carlo Rossoni; Referee: Matteo Cavacini

31 January 2026 22	ChievoVerona	2–0	Breno	Verona
14:30 CEST (UTC+2)	D'Este 72'; Campisi 90+2'	Report		Stadium: Stadio Aldo Olivieri; Referee: Alessio Bonasera

7 February 2026 23	Caldiero	4–1	ChievoVerona	Caldiero
20:30 CEST (UTC+2)	Zerbato 15' (pen.), 33'; Caneva 57'; Gentile 63'	Report	Costantino 90+1' (pen.)	Stadium: Stadio Mario Berti; Referee: Marco Costa

15 February 2026 24	ChievoVerona	1–4	Folgore Caratese	Verona
14:30 CEST (UTC+2)	Trillò 79'	Report	Gjonaj 25', 63'; Samotti 50'; Lepore 86' (pen.)	Stadium: Stadio Aldo Olivieri; Referee: Francesco Pio Sarcina

22 February 2026 25	Oltrepò	3–0	ChievoVerona	Broni
14:30 CEST (UTC+2)	Franceschinis 21'; Hrom 25' (pen.); Lo Monaco 77' (pen.)	Report		Stadium: Stadio Comunale San Contardo; Referee: Ismail Sabri

1 March 2026 26	ChievoVerona	1–0	Nuova Sondrio	Sona
14:30 CEST (UTC+2)	Paloschi 66'	Report		Stadium: Stadio Comunale; Referee: Gianpasquale Tedesco

=== Coppa Italia Serie D ===
31 August 2025 First round	Obermais	0–2	ChievoVerona	Merano
15:00 CEST (UTC+2)			Costantino 38'; Paloschi 57'	Stadium: Campo Sportivo Lahn; Referee: Gianpasquale Tedesco

8 October 2025 Second round	ChievoVerona	0–1	Rovato	Verona
14:30 CEST (UTC+2)			Pelamatti 54'	Stadium: Stadio Aldo Olivieri; Referee: Marco Schmid
