= European Association for Comparative Economic Studies =

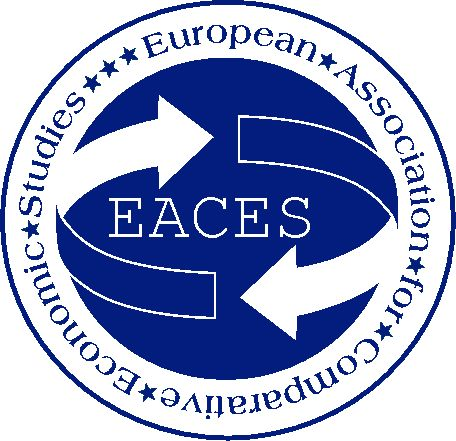
- Formation: January 31, 1991; 35 years ago
- Founded at: Turin, Italy
- Type: Verein
- Purpose: economic studies
- Region served: Europe
- Members: about 400 (2012)

EACES (European Association for Comparative Economic Studies) e.V. is a German Verein.

== Purpose of the association ==
The general purpose of the association is to initiate and co-ordinate international collaboration designed to assist the advancement of theoretical and applied knowledge in the field of comparative economic studies in Europe and elsewhere. Its aims are purely scientific.

The principal interests of the association are the theoretical analysis in the field and the comparative study of real economic systems. The areas concerned are the economies of East and West, North and South, as well as the economic interactions among systems and among regional areas, such as the European Union.

The association is envisaged as a broadly based organization in which all schools of analysis will exchange views and ideas on current and prospective research.

The association organizes international conferences and workshops, promoting the study and application of comparative economics and related subjects, form working groups to further research on particular topics, cooperate with other international groups, such as the International Economic Association, concerned with this and similar fields of research, and facilitate translations and publications

=== Journal ===
EACES has been publishing the European Journal of Comparative Economics, an open access double blind reviewed academic journal, published by the University Carlo Cattaneo. The journal was established in 2004 and appears biannually. It is abstracted and indexed by EconLit and EBSCO databases.

== Membership ==
Each individual person and institutional body can become a member of the association, which includes senior, junior, and institutional membership. The Managing Board decides on the applications.

Membership expires by withdrawal, death or exclusion. The announcement of withdrawal of a member will come into effect at the end of the current fiscal year and has to be declared in writing to the executive committee by 1 December. The obligation to pay membership fees ends in any case at the end of the current fiscal year.

Members who have failed to pay membership fees for two consecutive years will be suspended and may be excluded. The executive committee decides on the exclusion of members.

The association is not responsible for actions of its members and their consequences.

== Organs of the association ==
a. The executive committee and the general assembly of the members are the organs of the association. Unless specified differently, their decisions are taken with the vote of the simple majority of the members present.

Jens Hoelscher, President (2010)

b. Each individual and institutional member has right to one vote in the general assembly. Only individual members have both active and passive voting rights. Institutional members have only right to one active vote.

=== Managing board ===
Within the executive committee exists a managing board, which consists of the following:

- President
- Vice-president
- Secretary
- Treasurer

=== Elections ===
a. President, vice-president, treasurer and secretary are elected on separate ballot papers, by simple majority of members present at the General Assembly.
b. Other officers of the executive committee are elected on a single ballot paper. In the order of votes, candidates enter the executive committee until the new committee, excluding the president, vice-president, Treasurer, and Secretary, consists of nine members.

== History of the association ==
In an International Conference held in Urbino, Italy in 1989, a large number of European economists doing research in the field of comparative studies decided to build a new European association in order to further research and scientific exchanges on the subject.

There was, therefore, the establishment of a large promoting committee and of a more restricted organizing committee with the aim to prepare for the founding conference of the association. The founding conference was held in Verona, Italy on 27–29 September 1990 and saw the participation of around 160 economists of 24 different countries.

About 40% of participants were from Eastern Europe and the Soviet Union. The countries represented were: Austria, Belgium, Bulgaria, Czechoslovakia, Denmark, Finland, France, Japan, Germany (both West and East Germany), Hungary, India, Israel, Italy, Netherlands, Poland, Romania, Spain, Sweden, Switzerland, Turkey, United Kingdom, United States, Soviet Union, Yugoslavia.

The First General Assembly of EACES, held on 27 September 1990, approved the statute and elected Vittorio Valli (University of Turin) for the post of president. On the following day, with a secret ballot, there was the election of the other members of the executive committee on the basis of a list of candidates freely chosen by EACES member. Seven countries were represented in the executive committee. The status of host country probably contributed to an over representation of Italy in the committee, but the rotation of officers and of the location of general Conferences will correct this imbalances in the future. The association was formally registered at a public notary in Turin, Italy on 31 January 1991.

Since its foundation the association has organized nine general conferences and a number of specialized workshops in several countries.

The membership has increased to a total number of about 400, including 9 institutional members.
