= San Giulio, Castellanza =

San Giulio
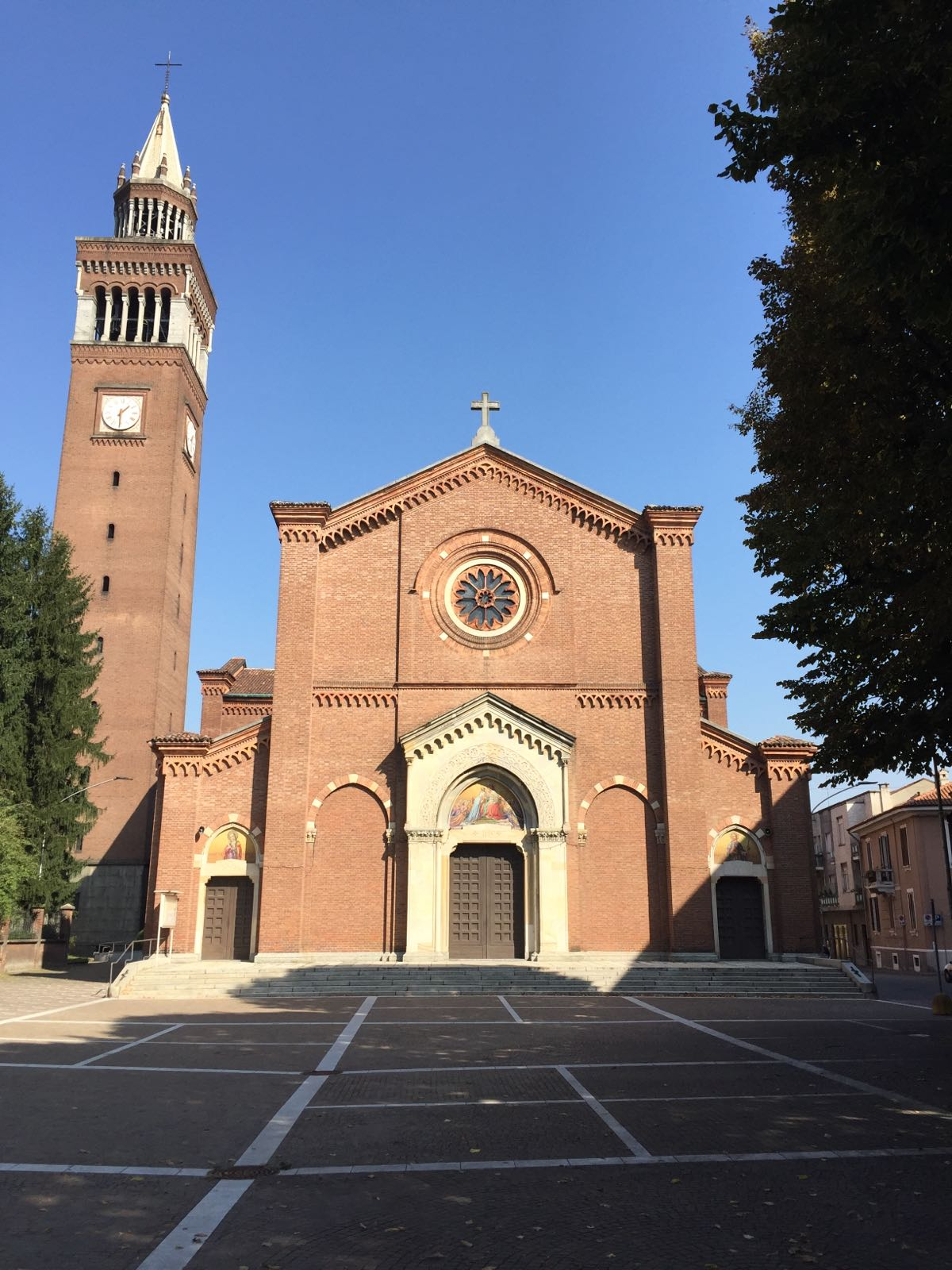
- The front side of the church of San Giulio.
- San Giulio
- 45.6053912°N 8.8915002°E
- Country: Italy
- Denomination: Catholic
- Website: www.comunitapastoralecastellanza.it

History
- Former name: Church of the Holy Family
- Status: Church
- Founded: February 1924
- Dedicated: March 1924

Architecture
- Functional status: Active
- Style: Romanesque, Lombard
- Groundbreaking: 1926
- Completed: 1953

Specifications
- Materials: Brick, Cement, Gold

Administration
- Division: Varese

Clergy
- Pastor: Don Walter Magni

The church of San Giulio is located in Castellanza, Varese, Northern Italy. It was built in the 20th century. The church is named after the saint Julius of Novara, also known as Giulio, who was a priest in the 4th century and was devoted to converting the heathen temples into Christian churches. The church is located in Paolo VI Square, adjacent to Corso Matteotti, which divides the town of Castellanza into two parts. It is on the site of an earlier church, the Church of the Holy Family.

== History ==
Location of the church

The history of the Church began at the end of the 19th century when the ancient Holy Family church was declared no longer useful. At that time, public opinion split into two groups. One group opted for an enlargement, while the other requested a complete reconstruction of the church and the surrounding site. On 2 February 1924, the priest Testori sent an invitation to a meeting to all the wealthy people of the town in order to exchange opinions about the future of the church. The meeting took place on 11 February at Palazzo Brambilla. The people present for this discussion included: Giacomo Binda, Sindaco, Ettorino and Egidio Pomini, Carlo Cerini, Pietro Soldini, Ambrogio Bonacina, Tito Burgis, Gabrio Pendolini Piola, Natale Colombo, the brothers Colombo Bolla, and all the priests of the town.

After a month of thinking, Mrs. Parker and Mr. Soldini offered money for the enlargement of the old church. The project was approved by the parish council, which decided to build it on the grounds of Park Bani.

The foundation stone of the existing church of San Giulio was placed by Mr. Roberto Colombo on 8 August 1926. The church was designed by the architect Maggi and constructed using materials from other churches in the surrounding area that were no longer active.

Street map of the Church of San Giulio in Castellanza

Palio di Castellanza serves as a celebration of the town’s religious history, with particular attention to the Church of San Giulio. The festival’s recognition of San Giulio, along with other historical elements, highlights the deep-rooted faith of Castellanza.

== Architecture and art ==
Church San Giulio has a Romanesque Revival and Lombard architectural style, and its front side faces the main square of the town of Castellanza. The key features of the north Italian Lombard Romanesque architectural style are brick and flat and wide facades covering the whole front of the church, often with a big rose window in the middle, above the entrance. The presbyterian pavement (architecture) was built in 1932 and is made of Venetian marble in a mosaic structure. In the pavement are represented geometric figures, and in the middle of these figures is a figure made by squares, with sides of 143 cm.

The represented figures are: a star made by two squares one over the other with a circle and the symbol of the sun in the middle; another star with 8 spikes with another star inside; and a circular figure with two crossed eclipses on the inside.

The height of the church tower is 83 meters, which makes it one of the highest towers in the surrounding area. The actual tower was built in 1932. Its height was limited by the imminent construction of the Milan Malpensa Airport.

=== Paintings ===
- Saint Catherine of Alexandria (early 16th century)
- Saint Lawrence (early 16th century)
- Our Lady of the Rosary and Angels (16th century)
- Madonna and Child with Saints (1640)
- Saint Charles
- Saint Mammes (1541)
- Pope at the foot of the cross

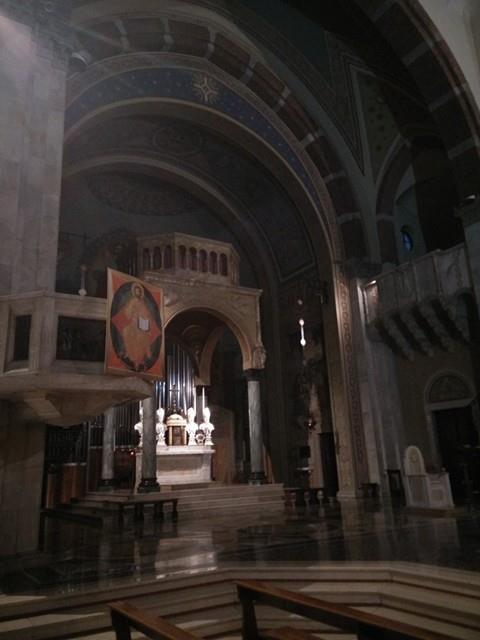
East end of the chapel with the pulpit on the left side

=== The Chapel ===
The chapel of the crucifix, desire to Don Testori, is located in the right transept. It was blessed by Cardinal Alfredo Ildefonso Schuster on 9 November 1941. The Gothic lines enclose the polychrome and are artistically crafted. A large niche protects an old painted wooden crucifix (17th–18th century).

In the left transept, the Chapel of Our Lady of Caravaggio is located. It was built in the 1950s. It contains both a large arch in marble of Crevola and an altar in marble of Candoglia. The chapel has frescoes and two windows that are themed Regina Pacis and Consolatrix Afflictorum.

The chapels are both enclosed by wrought-iron railings with symbolic ornament in bronze.

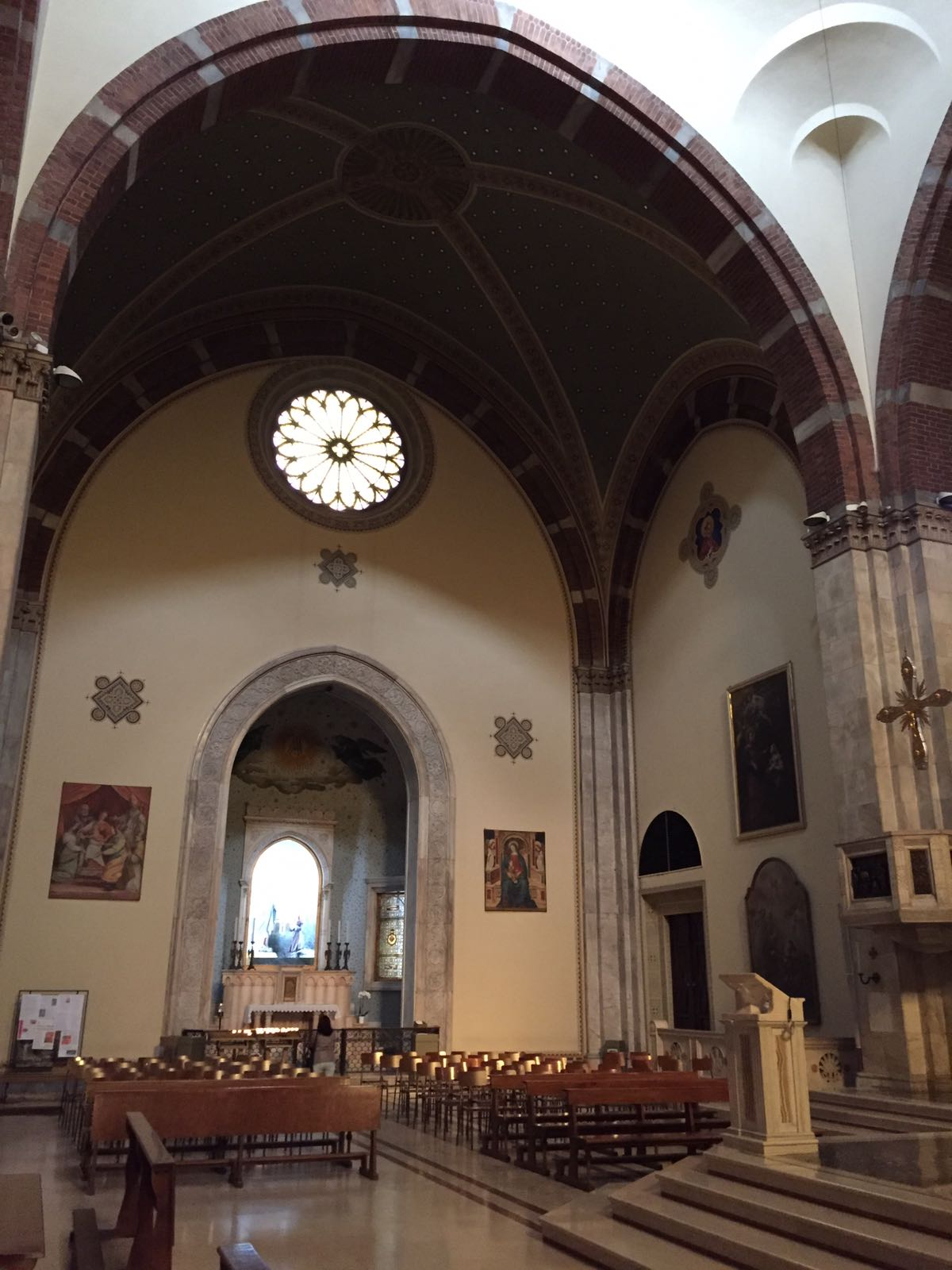
Inside the chapel of San Giulio

== Origin and style of the church ==
The church of San Giulio had its first foundation as a chapel around 1350–1380, proven by an inscription on the tomb dated to 1386. The chapel was expanded in 1500 with a central nave and side chapels. In 1880, it was further expanded, and additional chapels were created.

The parish priest, Don Luigi Testori, decided in 1930 to erect a new apse, presbytery, two transepts and two sacristies, after the demolition of the oldest part (the apse). In 1953, the final construction of the church was completed. The new facade was designed by engineer Maggi and was decorated with many rose windows.

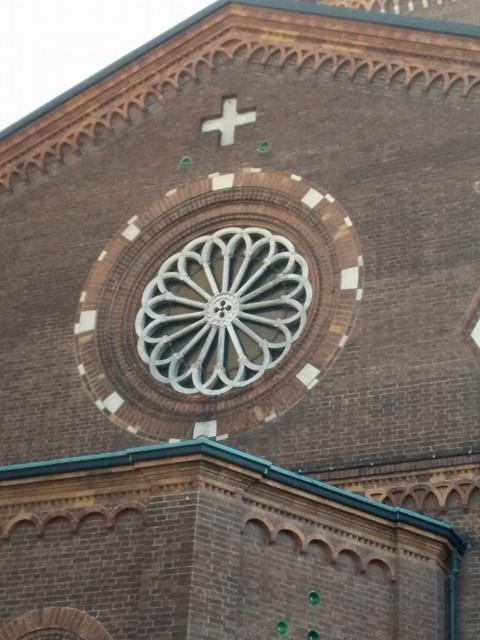
Rose window from the outside of the church

== Decoration of the transepts ==
The walls of the transepts are colourfully adorned. The archway and pillar were built with bricks and painted by hand. The ceilings are cross-vaulted and painted with tempera in the year 1940. The chapel of the "Crucifix" is placed on the right side of the transept. There is Gothic lettering, which is polychrome-painted. The arches were painted with a wooden crucifix in the 17th – 18th centuries. The chapel of Our Lady of Caravaggio is on the right side of the transept. The walls are also painted with frescoes, and there are two windows, which are designed with the themes of Regina Pacis and Consolatrix Afflictorum.

== Origin of the Ciborium ==
The ciborium was built in Byzantine style by the architect Giovanni Maggi and the sculptor Giannino Castiglioni in 1932. The columns, arches, and facades are made in yellow marble of Mori and Siena, while the columns and background of the upper side are made of onyx. The ciborium is made of four archivolts, which were designed with the reliefs of angels and four zoomorphic creatures. The interior dome of the ciborium is covered in gold leaf. The whole design and painting of the interior dome was made by the painter Giovanni Tonacca.

== Bibliography ==
- Anna Colombo Candiani, Momenti di vita castellanzese nella storia lombarda, Amministrazione comunale di Castellanza, 1975
