= Riondino =

Riondino is a surname. Notable people with the surname include:

- David Riondino (1952–2026), Italian singer-songwriter, actor, comedian, writer, playwright, screenwriter, director, and composer
- Michele Riondino (born 1979), Italian actor
- Michele Riondino (academic) (born 1978), Italian academic and canon law scholar
