= Molinelli =

Molinelli is an Italian surname. Notable people with the surname include:

- Benjamin Molinelli (born 2009), Argentinian footballer, entrepreneur, and author
- Andrea Molinelli (born 1993), Italian footballer
- Roberto Molinelli (born 1963), Italian composer, conductor, and violist
