= Giulio Mangano =

Italian footballer

Personal information
- Date of birth: 17 May 1999 (age 27)
- Place of birth: Varese, Italy
- Height: 1.94 m (6 ft 4 in)
- Position: Goalkeeper

Team information
- Current team: Varese

Youth career
- Inter Milan

Senior career*
Years	Team	Apps	(Gls)
2017–2018	Inter Milan	0	(0)
2017–2018	→ Pro Patria (loan)	22	(0)
2018–2024	Pro Patria	38	(0)
2024	Castellanzese	12	(0)
2025	Gżira United	12	(0)
2025–2026	Vogherese	19	(0)
2026–	Enna	11	(0)
2026-2027	Varese		
- * Club domestic league appearances and goals as of 13 July 2026

Giulio Mangano (born 17 May 1999) is an Italian professional footballer who plays as a goalkeeper for Serie D club Varese.

== Club career ==
Formed on Inter Milan youth sector, Mangano was loaned to Serie D club Pro Patria, he played 22 matches for the club, who won the 2017–18 Serie D this season.

In 2018 he joined to Pro Patria permanently. On 27 July 2021, he extended his contract until 2023.

== Honours ==
Pro Patria

- Serie D: 2017–18
