= Calcio Montebelluna =

Italian football club

Montebelluna
- Full name: Calcio Montebelluna
- Founded: 1919; 106 years ago
- Ground: Stadio San Vigilio, Montebelluna, Italy
- Capacity: 2,806 (seated)
- Chairman: Maurizio Michielin
- Manager: Loris Bodo
- League: N/A
- 2017–18: 15th
Home colours	Away colours

Calcio Montebelluna is an Italian association football club located in Montebelluna, Veneto.

== History ==
The club was founded in 1919 as U.S. Montebellunese.

=== Serie C2 ===
From the season 1981–82 to 1986–87 it has played in Serie C2.

=== Serie D ===
In the season 2003–04 it was promoted from Eccellenza Veneto to Serie D.

== Colors and badge ==
Its colors are white and blue.

== Players ==
=== Notable players ===
The following is a provisional list of international and notable former players of Montebelluna sorted by nationality:

- (Equatorial Guinea) Valeriano Nchama
- (Italy) Attilio Tesser

== Honours ==
- Coppa Italia Dilettanti
  - Winners: 1970–71
