= Michele Riondino (academic) =

Italian academic and canon law scholar

Personal details
- Born: 18 May 1978 (age 48)
- Education: Pontifical Lateran University, Vatican City Carlo Cattaneo University, Italy Catholic University of the Sacred Heart, Italy
- Profession: University Professor

Michele Riondino (born 18 May 1978) is an Italian academic and canon law scholar formerly based in Sydney, Australia. He was the foundation Professor of Canon Law at Australian Catholic University (ACU) from February 2019 until January 2024. He was the inaugural Director of ACU’s Canon Law Centre from September 2019 until January 2024.

== Early life and education ==
Michele Riondino was born and raised in Vittorio Veneto, a small city in the shadow of the Dolomites, northern Italy. The youngest of three siblings, he studied piano as a child and attended St Joseph’s College, where he received a Catholic primary and secondary education.

Riondino left home to study law in Milan at the Catholic University of the Sacred Heart and Carlo Cattaneo University. During this degree, he spent one semester as a visiting student at the University of Westminster Law School in London. Riondino obtained his law degree with a thesis on family mediation in Europe. He then moved to Rome to specialise in canon law. Here, he undertook a master's degree in the science of marriage and family, with a major in canon law, at the Pontifical John Paul II Institute for Studies on Marriage and Family. Later, he completed a Bachelor of Philosophy and Bachelor of Theology at the Pontifical Lateran University, during which he spent one year in Granada (Spain), while also attending the School of Theology.

Finally, Riondino obtained a PhD in Canon Law (summa cum laude) at the Lateran University, at which time he completed his dissertation, Giustizia riparativa e mediazione nel diritto penale canonico (i.e. “Restorative justice and mediation in the penal law of the Church”), supervised by Prof M. J. Arroba Conde and Prof L. Eusebi. This dissertation, which was published in its entirety, earned Riondino the Sub Auspiciis Lateranensibus prize for 2010’s best doctoral thesis.

== Academic career ==
Riondino has researched and written on canon law, matrimonial law, restorative justice and mediation, the teaching function of the Church concerning the Magisterium, sanctions in the Church, and international children’s rights with a particular focus on the right to education. He has published papers in Italian, Spanish, Portuguese, and English, in several law journals, such as Apollinaris, JUS, Revista Española de Derecho Canónico, Studia Canonica, E-Journal of International and Comparative Labour Studies, Vergentis, Il Diritto di Famiglia e delle Persone, Anuario de Derecho Canónico, Famiglia e Minori-Il Sole 24 Ore, Commentarium, Monitor Ecclesiasticus, Scientia Canonica, Studium, Suprema Lex and New Experiences of Juvenile Justice. In 2006, he began his academic career as a teaching assistant in Children’s Rights at LUMSA University in Rome, and in 2009, he taught in the Master’s Degree in Family Law and Child Law. Following this, he was an assistant professor of Canon Law and Children’s Rights in 2010 at the Pontifical Lateran University, where, in 2013, he won the open competition for a Full Professorship of Canon Law. From 2013 to 2016, he was also an adjunct professor of Canon Law at LUMSA University School of Law. In 2017, he was a guest professor at the Catholic University of Murcia–UCAM, lecturing in Canon Law at the postgraduate diploma in Matrimonial Law. In 2018, he spent the Spring Term as a visiting scholar at Heythrop College, University of London.

On 25 February 2019, Riondino was appointed as foundation Professor of Canon Law at ACU, where he served until January 2024. From 2020 until 2022, Riondino was also a visiting professor at John Paul II Pontifical Theological Institute for Marriage and Family Sciences, Madrid campus, where he lectures in International Children’s Rights. In February 2022, he was appointed guest professor at KU Leuven Faculty of Canon Law.

== Notable recent assignments and consultancies ==
Riondino is a member of scientific committees for two canon law journals: Monitor Ecclesiasticus (Italy) and Vergentis (Spain). Previously, from 2013-2018, he was a member of the editorial board of Apollinaris, the law review of the Pontifical Lateran University School of Comparative Law (i.e. Institutum Utriusque Iuris).

He is also a founding member of the scientific committee for Auribus – Centre for Prevention of Sexual Abuse and Protection of Victims, Rome, and gave a keynote address at its launch in January 2020. At this event, Auribus and the Canon Law Centre established a partnership particularly for the promotion of events and seminars to further the protection of children in the Church.

Riondino was engaged as a legal advisor to both the Archdiocese of Melbourne and the ACU Institute of Child Protection Studies, and as a member of the review panel of the Ecclesiastical Interdiocesan Tribunal of New South Wales and Australian Capital Territory. He was also named as a delegate for the fifth Australian Plenary Council. In 2021, he was appointed a Senior Fellow of PM Glynn Institute, Australian Catholic University.

In 2012, Riondino was appointed as a lawyer “ad casum” at the Congregation for the Doctrine of the Faith.

== Publications ==
=== Books ===
- Ex Corde Ecclesiae: Reflections after 30 years (ed. with A. Casamento), Sydney 2022. ISBN 9781925494891.
- Introducción al derecho canónico (with Arroba Conde, M. J.), Murcia 2020. ISBN 9788417789497.
- Introduction to Canon Law (with Arroba Conde, M. J.), Milano 2019. ISBN 9788800750066.
- Introduzione al diritto canonico (with Arroba Conde, M. J.), Milano 2019 (2nd edn, 2017; 1st edn, 2015). ISBN 9788800749473; ISBN 9788800749480 (electronic).
- Giustizia riparativa e mediazione nel diritto penale canonico, Città del Vaticano 2012 (1st edn, 2011). ISBN 9788846507389.
- Famiglia e Minori. Temi giuridici e canonici, Città del Vaticano 2011. ISBN 9788846507297.

=== Selected articles and book chapters ===
- ‘Thirty Years of the Apostolic Constitution Ex Corde Ecclesiae. A Canonical Overview and Future Prospects’ (2021) 55 Studia Canonica, 601-616.
- ‘Protection of children's rights in the international community and in the Catholic Church: A comparative analysis’ (2020) 77 Revista Española de Derecho Canónico 987-1046. ISSN 0034-9372.
- ‘El paradigma de la Justicia Restaurativa: manifestacion de misericordia en el derecho penal de la Iglesia’ (2020) 10 Vergentis, 83-98. ISSN 2445-2394; ISSN (electronic) 2605-3357.
- ‘Function and application of the penalty in the Code of Canon Law’ (2020) VI Jus Online 143-183. ISSN 1827-7942.
- ‘The 30th anniversary of the Convention on the Rights of the Child and Child Labour exploitation’ (2020) 9 E-Journal of International and Comparative Labour Studies, 90-96. ISSN 2280-4056.
- ‘The Magisterium of the Church on higher education and its reflection in the Code of Canon Law’ (2019) 3 Jus Online 204-224.
- ‘Reflections on fifty years of Church teaching on Universities (from Gravissimum Educationis to Ex corde Ecclesiae)’ in Whittle, S. (ed), Vatican II and New Thinking about Catholic Education (London – New York, 2017) 207-214. ISBN 9781472488633.
- ‘The right to education: a fundamental and universal right’ (2016) LXIII Jus 287-300. ISSN 0022-6955.
- ‘Le sanzioni nella Chiesa’ in Arroba Conde, M. J. (ed), Manuale di Diritto Canonico (Città del Vaticano, 2014) 253-267. ISBN 9788846509888.
- ‘La Convenzione di Lanzarote. Aspetti giuridici e canonici in tema di abuso sui minori’ (2013) 86 Apollinaris 149-176. ISBN 9788846509130.
- ‘Justiça reparativa e direito penal canônico. Aspectos substanciais’ (2013) 6 Suprema Lex 63-76. ISSN 2236-4137.
- ‘Connessione tra pena canonica e pena statuale’ in AA. VV., Questioni attuali di diritto penale canonico (Città del Vaticano, 2012) 199-226. ISBN 9788820987701.
- ‘Mediazione familiare e interculturalità in Europa. Profili di diritto comparato’ (2010) 39 Il Diritto di Famiglia e delle Persone 1845-1870. ISSN 0390-1882.
- 'Bonum coniugum e giuridicità nel matrimonio canonico' (2009) 38 Il Diritto di Famiglia e delle Persone 2048-2091. ISSN 0390-1882.
