= Riccardo Cocuzza =

Italian footballer

Personal information
- Date of birth: 27 January 1993 (age 33)
- Place of birth: Vizzolo Predabissi, Italy
- Height: 1.82 m (6 ft 0 in)
- Position: Forward

Team information
- Current team: Fanfulla

Youth career
- 2002–2010: Inter Milan
- 2010–2013: Parma

Senior career*
Years	Team	Apps	(Gls)
2013–2015	Parma	0	(0)
2013–2014	→ Gubbio (loan)	14	(2)
2014	→ Südtirol (loan)	3	(0)
2014–2015	→ Renate (loan)	28	(7)
2015–2016	Savona	29	(6)
2016–2017	Fano	7	(0)
2017–2018	Bustese Milano City	42	(14)
2018–2019	Legnago Salus	18	(7)
2019–2021	Legnano	62	(31)
2021–2022	Caratese	37	(11)
2022–2023	Castellanzese	36	(9)
2023–	Fanfulla	16	(3)
- * Club domestic league appearances and goals as of 20 December 2023

Riccardo Cocuzza (born 27 January 1993) is an Italian footballer who plays for Serie D club Fanfulla.

== Biography ==
Born in Vizzolo Predabissi, the province of Milan, Lombardy, Cocuzza started his career at Inter Milan. He was the member of the youth teams from 2002 until January 2010. Cocuzza scored 5 goals for Inter U-17 team in the first half of 2009–10 season, which he scored 4 goals in a single game against Pavia.

=== Parma ===
In January 2010 he was signed by fellow Serie A club Parma, which Cocuzza was a member of the under-17 team in the first season.

Cocuzza was a member of the reserve team from 2010 to 2011 season to January 2013, which he had a cruciate ligament injury in 2011–12 season. On 1 February 2013 Cocuzza was farmed to Gubbio. In 2013–14 season the loan was extended, which Cocuzza played for Gubbio in the first pre-season friendly along with other former Parma team-mate.

On 31 January 2014 Cocuzza and Mohamed Traoré left for Südtirol, with Andrea Molinelli moved to Gubbio.

On 8 July 2014 he was farmed to Renate.
