= Valeriano Nchama =

Equatoguinean footballer (born 1995)

Personal information
- Full name: Jesús Valeriano Nchama Oyono
- Date of birth: 18 June 1995 (age 31)
- Place of birth: Malabo, Equatorial Guinea
- Height: 1.90 m (6 ft 3 in)
- Position: Midfielder

Team information
- Current team: Trevigliese

Youth career
- Limbiate
- Nouva SA.MO.
- Bresso Calcio
- Molinello
- –2012: Aldini
- 2012–2014: Inter Milan
- 2014: → Varese (loan)

Senior career*
Years	Team	Apps	(Gls)
2014–2015	Altovicentino	16	(1)
2015	Montebelluna	14	(1)
2015–2016	Altovicentino	12	(4)
2016	Vigasio	15	(1)
2016–2017	Nibbiano		
2017–2020	Montebelluna	83	(6)
2020–2021	Manzanese	37	(8)
2021–2023	Arzignano	50	(3)
2023–2024	Cjarlins Muzane	28	(2)
2024	Chievo	0	(0)
2024–2025	Campodarsego	19	(1)
2025–2026	Pavia	13	(1)
2026–	Trevigliese	5	(0)

International career^{‡}
2013–	Equatorial Guinea	9	(0)
- * Club domestic league appearances and goals as of 1 March 2026 ‡ National team caps and goals as of 15 November 2020

Jesús Valeriano Nchama Oyono (born 18 June 1995) is an Equatoguinean footballer who plays as a midfielder for Italian Serie D club Trevigliese and the Equatorial Guinea national team. He also holds Italian passport.

== Early life ==
Valeriano was born in Malabo, Bioko Norte Province. When he was 2, his parents moved to Italy with him and his brother.

== Club career ==
Valeriano joined Inter in 2012, after playing in the modest Aldini. In his first season, he was a member of the Allievi Nazionali team, the third largest of all Internazionale. Also that year, Valeriano has been a substitute in two Primavera League matches, but he was not used. He finally made his league debut with Inter second team in the following season, appearing in a 3–0 victory against Cittadella on 31 August 2013.

On 6 July 2021, he moved to Arzignano.

On 9 August 2025, Nchama signed for Pavia.

== International career ==
Valeriano made his debut for the Equatoguinean senior team in a friendly against Libya on 4 September 2013. His international debut in an official match was three days later against Sierra Leone.
