= Andrea Molinelli =

Italian footballer (born 1993)

Personal information
- Date of birth: 6 May 1993 (age 33)
- Place of birth: Castel San Giovanni, Italy
- Height: 1.80 m (5 ft 11 in)
- Position: Midfielder

Team information
- Current team: Romanese Calcio

Youth career
- –2012: Piacenza
- 2011–2012: → Genoa (loan)

Senior career*
Years	Team	Apps	(Gls)
2012–2015	Livorno	6	(0)
2013–2014	→ South Tyrol (loan)	0	(0)
2014	→ Gubbio (loan)	0	(0)
2015	Pergolettese	6	(0)
2015–2016	Fiorenzuola	17	(0)
2016	Olginatese	6	(0)
2017–	Romanese Calcio		
- * Club domestic league appearances and goals

Andrea Molinelli (born 6 May 1993) is an Italian footballer who plays for Romanese Calcio.

== Career ==
Born in Castel San Giovanni, the Province of Piacenza, Emilia region, Molinelli started his career at Piacenza. He received a call-up to Christmas Youth Tournament from Italian Football Federation (FIGC) in December 2007. In January 2011 he was signed by Serie A club Genoa in temporary deal. However Molinelli only able to play in the reserve team. In August 2011 the loan was extended.

=== Livorno ===
In summer 2012 Piacenza was bankrupted; Molinelli was signed by Livorno on free transfer that summer, despite the transfer also cost Livorno €30,000 as agent fee. Molinelli signed a four-year contract. On 25 August 2012 Molinelli made his Serie B debut against Juve Stabia. He was substituted at half time by Emerson.

=== South Tyrol ===
On 11 July 2013 he was signed by South Tyrol (German: Südtirol, Italian: Alto Adige) in co-ownership deal for €30,000. On 31 January 2014 he was signed by Gubbio, with Cocuzza and Traoré moved to opposite direction via Parma. On 14 June 2014 Livorno bought back Molinelli from South Tyrol.

=== Return to Livorno ===
Molinelli wore no.15 shirt for Livorno in 2014–15 Serie B. By February 2015, he had not played any game in the whole season.
