= Pomini =

Pomini is a surname. Notable people with the surname include:

- Alberto Pomini (born 1981), Italian footballer
- Edgardo Pomini (1917–1958), Argentine fencer and Olympian
