= Paulinho (footballer, born August 1997) =

Brazilian footballer

Personal information
- Full name: Paulo Henrique Rolim de Genova
- Date of birth: 26 August 1997 (age 29)
- Place of birth: Assis, Brazil
- Height: 1.78 m (5 ft 10 in)
- Position: Midfielder

Team information
- Current team: Angolana

Senior career*
Years	Team	Apps	(Gls)
2016–2019	São Paulo	1	(0)
2019–2022	Triestina	32	(1)
2022	→ Legnago (loan)	16	(0)
2023	Paysandu	9	(0)
2023–2024	Bassano	27	(2)
2024–2025	Chievo	33	(3)
2025	Poggibonsi	9	(0)
2025–	Angolana		
- * Club domestic league appearances and goals as of 30 November 2025

Paulo Henrique Rolim de Genova (born 26 August 1997), known as Paulinho or Paulo Henrique, is a Brazilian professional footballer who plays as a midfielder for Italian Eccellenza club Angolana.

== Club career ==
Born in Assis, Paulinho started his career in São Paulo. He made his professional debut on 17 January 2018 against São Bento, for Campeonato Paulista.

On 3 August 2019, he moved to Italy and joined Serie C club Triestina.

On 21 January 2022, he moved on loan to Legnago.

== Personal life ==
He has Italian passport.
