= Rocco Costantino =

Italian footballer

Personal information
- Date of birth: 8 May 1990 (age 36)
- Place of birth: Aarau, Switzerland
- Height: 1.80 m (5 ft 11 in)
- Position: Forward

Team information
- Current team: ChievoVerona
- Number: 9

Senior career*
Years	Team	Apps	(Gls)
2017–2019	Südtirol	57	(21)
2019–2020	Triestina	33	(11)
2020	Bari	5	(0)
2020–2021	Modena	11	(0)
2021	→ Pro Vercelli (loan)	17	(6)
2021–2024	Monterosi	66	(33)
2024–2025	Catania	16	(1)
2024–2025	→ Lucchese (loan)	14	(2)
2025	→ Messina (loan)	10	(0)
2025–	ChievoVerona	22	(8)
- * Club domestic league appearances and goals as of 4 March 2026

Rocco Costantino (born 8 May 1990) is an Italian footballer who plays as a forward for ChievoVerona.

== Career ==
Costantino made his first match in senior football on 27 August 2017 in a 1–0 win against AlbinoLeffe.

On 28 August 2021, he signed a multi-year contract with Monterosi.

On 1 January 2024, he signed contract with Catania. On 7 August 2024, Costantino was loaned by Lucchese.
