= Riccardo Tosi =

Italian footballer

Personal information
- Date of birth: 27 December 1999 (age 26)
- Place of birth: Negrar, Italy
- Height: 1.88 m (6 ft 2 in)
- Position: Goalkeeper

Team information
- Current team: ChievoVerona
- Number: 22

Youth career
- –2017: San Martino Speme
- 2016–2017: → Verona (loan)

Senior career*
Years	Team	Apps	(Gls)
2017–2020	Hellas Verona	0	(0)
2017–2018	→ Virtus Verona (loan)	10	(0)
2018–2020	→ Arzignano (loan)	57	(0)
2020–2023	Mantova	33	(0)
2023–2024	Legnago	1	(0)
2023–	ChievoVerona	0	(0)
- * Club domestic league appearances and goals as of 1 July 2024

Riccardo Tosi (born 27 December 1999) is an Italian footballer who plays as a goalkeeper for Serie D Group B club AC ChievoVerona.

== Club career ==
=== Verona ===
He joined the Under-19 squad of Verona in 2016. For the 2017–18 season he was loaned to Serie D club Virtus Verona.

==== Loan to Arzignano ====
For the 2018–19 season he joined Serie D club Arzignano on loan. He established himself as the first-choice goalkeeper for the team and helped it achieve promotion to Serie C. On 12 July 2019 the loan was renewed for the 2019–20 season.

He made his professional Serie C debut for Arzignano on 25 August 2019 in a season-opening game against Piacenza.

=== Mantova ===
On 19 August 2020 he joined Mantova.

=== Legnago and ChievoVerona ===
On 16 July 2023, Tosi joined Legnago on a one-year deal.

One year later, on 1 July 2024, he joined the new Chievo.
