= Sona, Veneto =

Sona
- Comune
- Comune di Sona
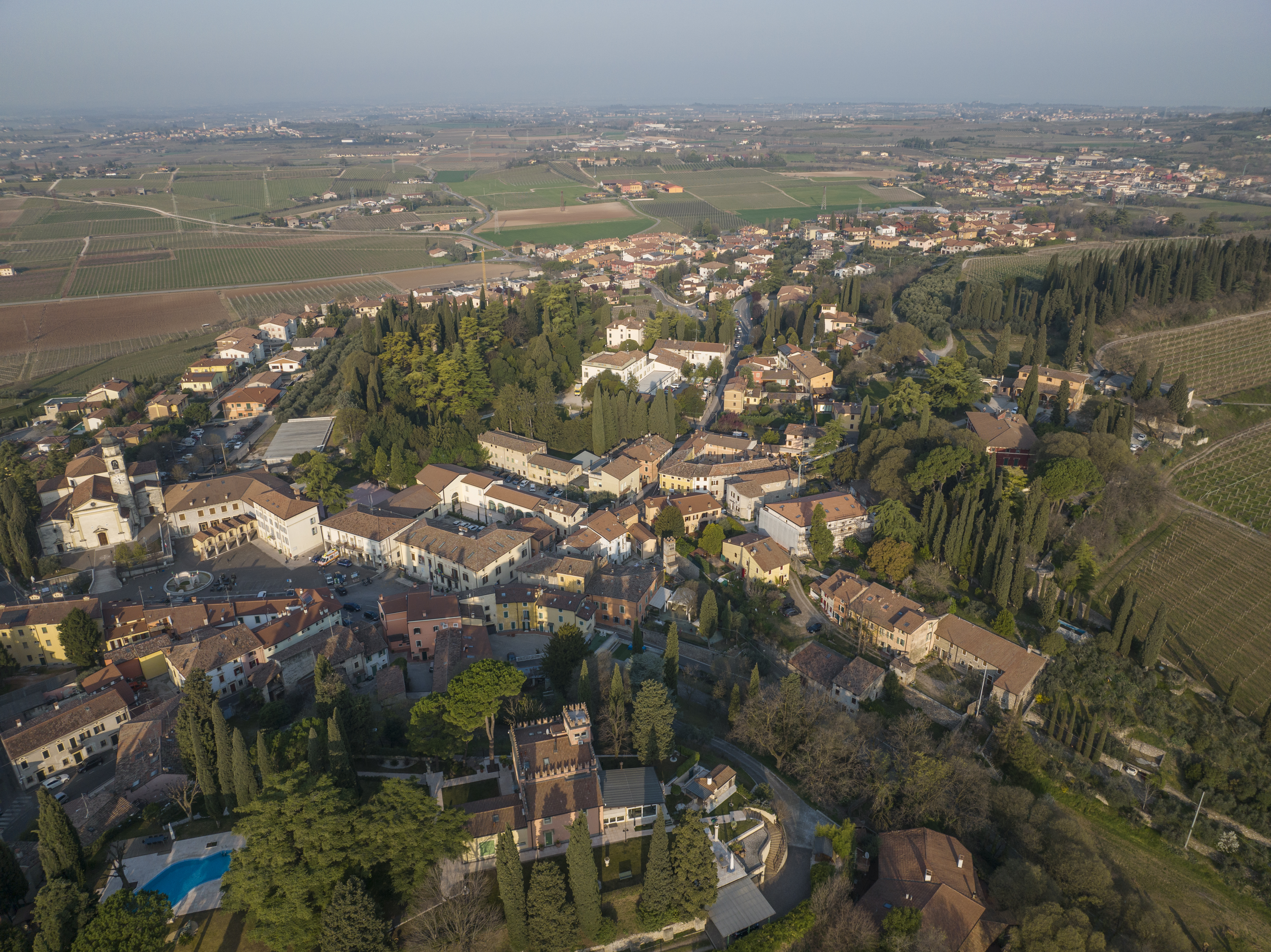
- Church

- Location within Italy Location within Veneto
- Coordinates: 45°26′N 10°50′E
- Country: Italy
- Region: Veneto
- Province: Verona (VR)
- Frazioni: Lugagnano, Palazzolo, San Giorgio in Salici

Area
  - Total: 41.14 km^{2} (15.88 sq mi)
- Elevation: 169 m (554 ft)

Population (2008)
  - Total: 16,856
  - Density: 409.7/km^{2} (1,061/sq mi)
- Demonym: Sonesi
- Time zone: UTC+1 (CET)
  - Summer (DST): UTC+2 (CEST)
- Postal code: 37060
- Dialing code: 045
- ISTAT code: 023083
- Saint day: 6 August
- Website: Official website

Sona is a comune with a population of 14,269 in the province of Verona in Italy with an area of 41.14 square kilometres (15.88 square miles).

== Physical Geography ==
The municipality of Sona, which is located about halfway between Verona, from which it is 13.5 km away, and the Lake Garda, borders to the Bussolengo to the north, Verona to the east, Sommacampagna to the south, Valeggio sul Mincio to the southwest, and Castelnuovo del Garda to the northwest. The municipal territory, which develops for a large part between the morainic hills of the bottom, formed by the glacier sliding towards the valley that gave way to Lake Garda, develops between 83 meters of the flat portion of the territory and 240 meters of the higher hill. high, while the Town Hall rises 169 meters.

== Twin towns ==
Sona is twinned with:

- Wadowice (Lesser Poland, Poland)
- Weiler-Simmerberg (Bavaria, Germany)

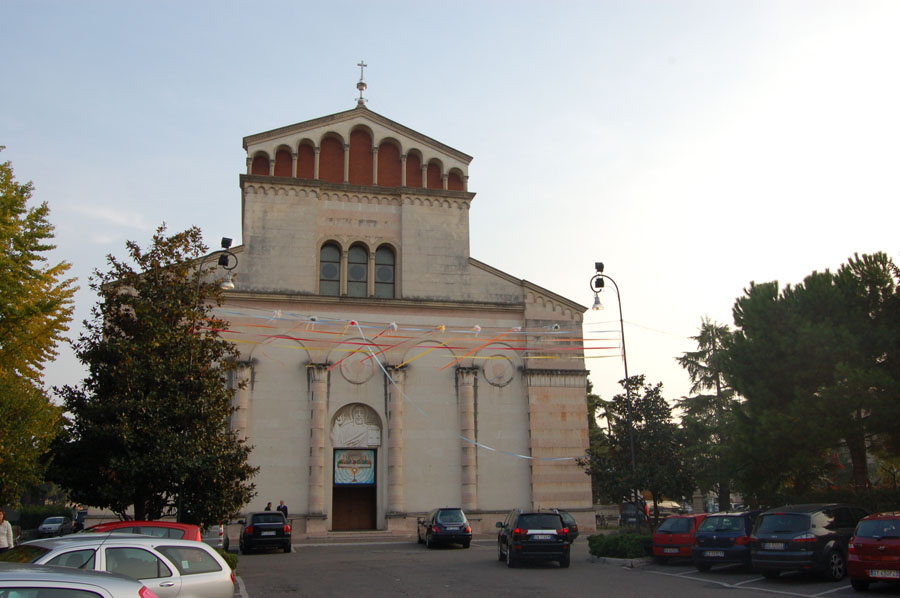
Church of Lugagnano

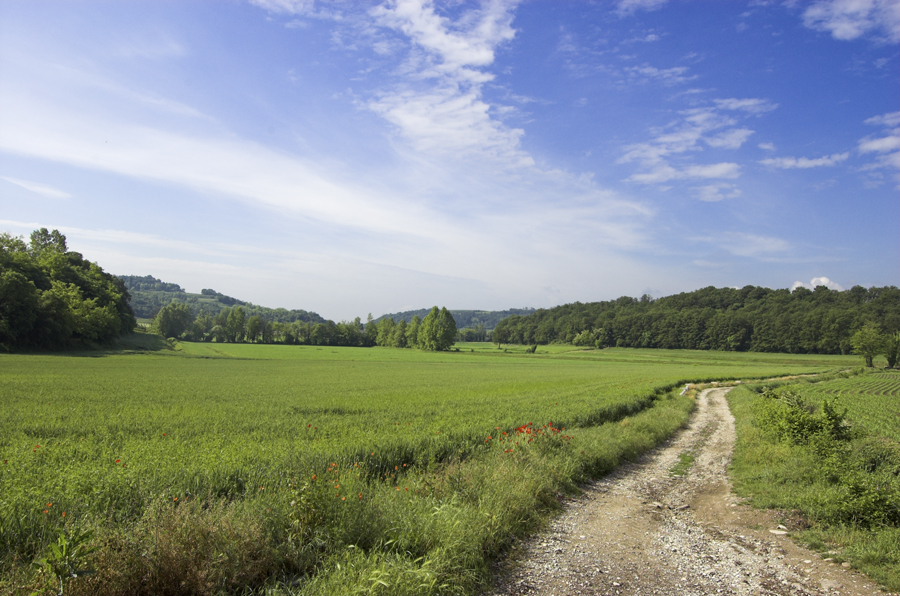
The moraine hills created by the glacier of Lake Garda during the last glaciation. Area between Sona and Sommacampagna

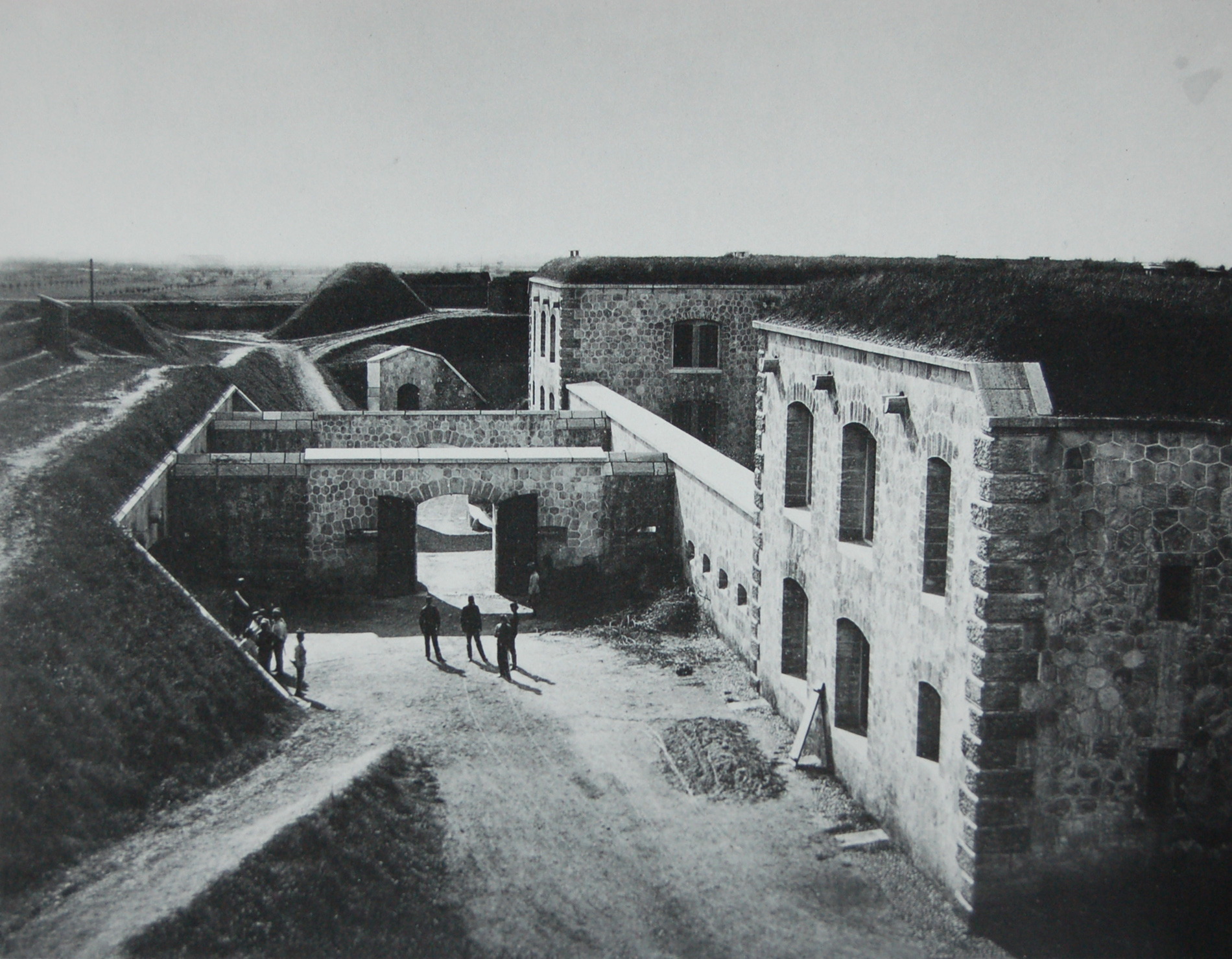
Lugagnano Fort, part of the Austro-Hungarian fortress of Verona, in 1863. Photo by Moritz Lotze (1809-1890)
