= University Carlo Cattaneo =

Private university in Castellanza, Italy

Coordinates: 45°36′47″N 8°54′03″E

LIUC Carlo Cattaneo University
- Libero Istituto Universitario Carlo Cattaneo (Italian)
- Type: Private
- Established: 1991
- President: Riccardo Comerio
- Vice-president: Vittorio Gandini
- Rector: Federico Visconti
- Undergraduates: 2,327 (2019)
- Postgraduates: 867 (2019)
- Location: Castellanza, Italy
- Sporting affiliations: CUS Milano
- Website: www.liuc.it

The Carlo Cattaneo University (Italian: Libera Università Carlo Cattaneo, LIUC) is a proprietary, for-profit university located in Castellanza, province of Varese, Italy.

It provides undergraduate and postgraduate education in the fields of economics, management, and industrial engineering.

== History and profile ==
It was founded in 1991 by around 300 entrepreneurs, as a joint venture between Italian corporations who provided the initial funding and continued to provide support and guidance under the seal of the Industrial Association of the Province of Varese (UNIVA). The university, housed in a restored nineteenth-century cotton mill, is organised into three Faculties (Business & Economics, Business Law and Management Engineering). The university is named after Carlo Cattaneo, a nineteenth-century local thinker and economist.

Evolution of course offerings:

- In 1991, the university opened with an incoming class for the Bachelor of Business Administration (Economia Aziendale).
- In 1994, a diploma in Engineering Management was offered.
- In 1998, the bachelor's program in Business Law was introduced.

== Campus ==
=== Cantoni cotton mill ===
LIUC is located within the historic structure of an industrial complex, the Cantoni cotton mill, built around 1830, and which later became full of industry. The restoration and rehabilitation of the former spinning workshop were commissioned by the Union of Industrialists of the Province of Varese.

=== Campus today ===
To date, the factory buildings have been the home to the University Campus. The covered area of the university is 68,000 square metres; classrooms with a total of 3,000 seats, a lecture hall of more than 300 seats, five workshops, a library of 1,600 square metres with 100,000 volumes and a rich collection of periodicals, an auditorium with 100 seats, a cafeteria dedicated to student activities, experiential workshops and various events.

=== Dormitories ===
The campus of LIUC also has a university residence, named after the Castellanza industrialist Luigi Pomini, with 440 beds and a total area of 10,800 square metres that accommodates both Italian and foreign students.

=== LIUC Park ===
The university campus complex also has a green space, LIUC park, of 26,000 square metres. The location is utilised for conducting the annual degree ceremony.

== Programs ==
Faculty of Business & Economics

- Finance and Administration
- Communication, Marketing and New Media
- Sports Management
- Management and entrepreneurship
- Business Economics (taught in English)
- Global Markets (taught in English)
- Family Business Management (taught in English)
- Administration and Audit
- Bank, Markets and Finance
- Economy and Business Management
- Entrepreneurship & Innovation (taught in English)
- International Business Management (taught in English)
- Management of Human Resources - HR & Consulting
- Marketing

Faculty of Engineering

- Systems and Services for Digital Business
- Industrial Operations Excellence (taught in Italian or English)
- Data Science for Operational Excellence
- Digital Consulting
- Health Care System Management
- Manufacturing Strategy (taught in English)

== Rankings and research ==
It is one of the three Italian universities (together with SDA Bocconi and Università Cattolica) which are part of the Institute for Strategy and Competitiveness's network teaching Michael Porter's Microeconomics of Competitiveness graduate class. In 2015, the Italian economic newspaper Il Sole 24 Ore placed LIUC university as the third best private economic school in Italy by didactics, and fifth, taking into account also research. However, the university is not ranked among "QS Top Universities".

== Library ==
Biblioteca Mario Rostoni was established in 1991 and is the academic library affiliated with University Carlo Cattaneo. It has as many as 110,000 volumes, which comprise ebooks, paper books, magazines, financial statements, and databases of economy, management, law and engineering.

== Student and alumni associations ==
- Students and researchers who have attended at least one year at the University Carlo Cattaneo participate in the LIUC Alumni Association.
- Leo Club is an extension of Lions International composed of young people. The purpose is to organise services to raise money for pro-bono causes.
- Erasmus Student Network is a non-profit international student organisation.
- Junior Enterprise LIUC allows teams of students to perform management consulting projects for companies located in Italy and abroad.
- ELSA is part of European Law Students' Association, the world's largest independent law students' association.

== Notable students ==
- Alessio Agostinelli, partner and managing director in Boston Consulting Group
- Giovanni Ciferri, co-founder and CEO of Buddyfit
- Luca Fachin, COO of Deutsche Bank Italy
- Francesca Locatelli, head of Global Service Italy, Greece and Turkey of Vodafone.
- Davide Riboni, president of Lavazza Professional NAAP, president of Business Unit America, CEO Lavazza Premium Coffee

== Notable faculty ==
- Enrico Letta

== See also ==
- List of Italian universities
