= Castellanza =

- Comune
- Comune di Castellanza
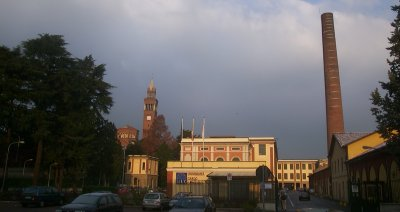

- Location within Italy Location within Lombardy
- Coordinates: 45°36′27″N 8°53′25″E
- Country: Italy
- Region: Lombardy
- Province: Varese (VA)
- Frazioni: Castegnate, Buon Gesù

Government
  - Mayor: Cristina Borroni (acting mayor since 26 April 2024)

Area
  - Total: 6 km^{2} (2.3 sq mi)
- Elevation: 216 m (709 ft)
- Highest elevation: 232 m (761 ft)
- Lowest elevation: 205 m (673 ft)

Population (01/01/2023)
  - Total: 14,077
  - Density: 2,300/km^{2} (6,100/sq mi)
- Demonym: Castellanzesi
- Time zone: UTC+1 (CET)
  - Summer (DST): UTC+2 (CEST)
- Postal code: 21053
- Dialing code: 0331
- ISTAT code: 012042
- Patron saint: San Giulio
- Saint day: 31 January
- Website: Official website

Castellanza is a town and comune located in the province of Varese, along the boundary of the province of Milan, in the Lombardy region of northern Italy.

== Overview ==
The toponym refers to the castellanze (plural form, singular castellanza), defensive territorial unities who rose around castles and other strong points in the then county of Seprio. The Olona river divides Castellanza in the two main boroughs of Castellanza proper and Castegnate. The town is renowned for its in 1991 founded private University Carlo Cattaneo (also known as LIUC). The main church of the city is the Church of San Giulio, Castellanza which is located in Paolo VI Square.

The town has a population of 14,516 in 2019, and since the late nineteenth century has been one of the main industrial centres in the province of Varese. With the backdrop of the Alps and the famous Italian lakes Lago Maggiore and Lago di Como, the province of Varese is also home to 23,000 manufacturing and craft industries that export over 30% of their products worldwide and generate employment to approximately 175,000 people.

Castellanza received the honorary title of city with a presidential decree on January 4, 1974.

The coat of arms of the municipality represents the union of the two nuclei that formed the city. On the left is a tower, which symbolizes the Castle (Castellanza); on the right a chestnut tree which symbolizes Castegnate. At the time of the attribution of the title of City (1974), the turreted crown, the symbol of the city, was added to the coat of arms surmounted by the crown of the Municipality. The two-crowned coat of arms was later replaced by the one-crowned one.

== Monuments ==
In the town, there are several buildings :

- The "Enzo Pagani" Museum of Modern Art, which has 650 works of art - Due to a lack of public funding, the Pagani family was unable to continue to meet the costs of management and the museum has been closed since 2013,
- the University Carlo Cattaneo (LIUC), which was born on the remains of the city's old industrial buildings,
- the Brambilla-Carminati palace, building from 1789, where the town hall is located.
- the Church of San Giulio, Castellanza

== Personalities ==
- Marco Simone, (1969-), international footballer and coach
- Paola Antonia Negri, (1508–1555), Italian nun and co-founder of the Angelic Sisters of St. Paul

== Schools ==
We can find different schools :

- two public primary schools, the “Edmondo De Amicis” school and the “Alessandro Manzoni” school.
- two other private primary schools, the Salesian school of the Daughters of Mary Help of Christians and the “Maria Montessori” school.
- a public college, the secondary school of the 1st degree “Leonardo da Vinci” (Leonardo da Vinci)
- a foreign language high school, the high school « Enrico Fermi »

== Sport ==
The local football club USD Castellanzese was founded in 1921. The colours of the team are green and black, which are also used by Venice football club. The venue for internal competitions is the municipal stadium Giovanni Provasi, established in the 1930s.

== Administration ==
- ...
- 1972 - 1989 : Giulio Moroni (Democrazia Cristiana)
- 1990 - 1994 : Luigi Roveda (Democrazia Cristiana)
- 1995 - 13 june 2004 : Livio Frigoli (Democratici per Castellanza)
- 14 june 2004 - 8 january 2006 : Maria Grazia Ponti (Città Viva)
- 9 january 2006 - 29 may 2006 : Giuliana Longhi (commissario prefettizio)
- 30 may 2006 - … : Fabrizio Farisoglio (Farisoglio Sindaco)
