= USD Castellanzese =

Italian football club

- USD Castellanzese logo
- Full name: Unione Sportiva Dilettantistica Castellanzese Calcio 1921
- Nickname: Neroverde
- Founded: 1921
- Ground: Giovanni Provasi Municipal Stadium
- Capacity: 498
- Coordinates: 45.60661°N 8.89761°E
- Chairman: Salvatore Asmini
- Head coach: Manuel Scalise
- League: Serie D Group B
- 2023-2024: Serie D, 16th of 20
- Website: https://www.castellanzese.com/
Home colours	Away colours	Third colours

U.S.D. Castellanzese 1921 (Unione Sportiva Dilettantistica Castellanzese 1921 Associazione Sportiva Dilettantistica), commonly referred to as USD Castellanzese [Italian pronunciation: uˌɛsseˈdi kastellanˈtseːze] or simply Castellanzese [Italian pronunciation: kastellanˈtseːze], is a football club based in Castellanza, Lombardy, in Italy. Founded in 1921, the club competes in the Serie D, the fourth tier of the Italian football system, in which they have competed since the 2019–2020 season after getting promoted from Eccellenza.

== History ==
=== Foundation and early years (1920–1930) ===
The Association was established in 1921 as an Italian sports club dedicated to cycling, athletics, football, a motorcycle club, and table tennis. It was established by Giuseppe Scandrolio, with support from key collaborators including Ercole Airoldi, Alfredo Gamassi, Umberto Baita, and Pierino Albini. The presence of major international industries in the vicinity played a crucial role in financing these local sporting events. The club selected black and green as its team colors in homage to the renowned Venice football club Venezia FC, giving the club the 'Neroverde' nickname.

From 1920 to 1930, the Union Sportiva Castellanzese organized a variety of sports events for both men and women, including 31 cycling races, 5 walking races, 2 women's athletics and 3 men's athletics competitions, as well as an Italian women's ball and basket championship race.

Among the cyclists who wore the green and black colours for the first time were Giovanni Maggioni, Giulio Rivolta, Giulio Colombo, Silvio Balconi, Carlo Turconi, Alberto Tognola, Angelo Lattuada, Giovanni Vassuri, Alfonso Crippa, Mario Praderio, Enrico Bolis, Carlo Colombo, Giulio Rimoldi, Luigi Stefanazzi, Alfredo Bovet and Enrico Bovet. In ten years these cyclists secured approximately 100 victories and numerous commendable placements in a variety of races.

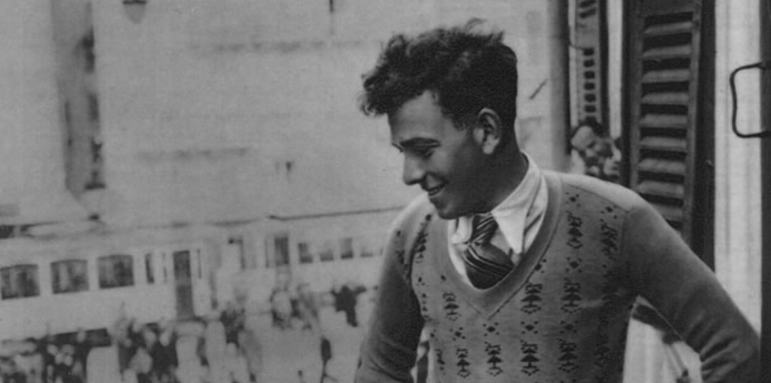
Alfredo Bovet of the Italian sports club Castellanzese, in 1932

Alfredo Bovet stood out as a prominent figure, achieving numerous successes such as winning the Milan San Remo in 1932, securing third place overall in the Giro d´Italia and claiming victory in the Tour of Catalonia in Spain. Other notable athletes associated with the Castellanzese included Olmo, Mario Praderio, Giulio Rimoldi, Achille Colombo, Pierino Agnesina, Mario Galimberti, Mario Bassani, and Mario Amorini.

This era marked a distinguished period for the Castellanzese, with its athletes earning approximately 40 cups, plaques, and medallions of moral and intrinsic value. In 1930, the club achieved significant recognition by ranking first overall among Lombard clubs with 18 victories. This was primarily due to the contributions of the renowned trio: Alfredo Bovet, Enrico Bovet, and Mario Praderio.

=== 1930–1970 ===
Between 1932 and 1937, only 24 cycling competitions, one marathon, and an athletics event featuring Olympic athletes were organized by the Castellanzese sports club. A decline in members from 86 in 1932 to 36 by 1937 was due to a loss of reputation, the prelude to World War II, and other factors. Between 1930 and 1940, the historical record remains incomplete, and the names of athletes who achieved success during this period were not registered in the club records.

In 1935, a football team from Castegnate, a locality in Castellanza, emerged as a strong rival for the Neroverde (black-green) team. This team was not enrolled in the F.I.G.C. (in Italian: Federazione Italiana Gioco Calcio) and participated in a separate championship as "LIBERI." The team was financed by Mr. Ferrario, a local wine merchant, and included notable players like Cesare Canavesi, Mario Rabolini, Giulio Selmo, and others. In 1938, they reached the championship final against Fagnano Olona.

=== 1970–present ===
In 1970, the Unione Sportiva Castellanzese focused solely on registering with FIDAL (The Italian Athletics Federation) due to financial and other constraints. The traditional Castellanzese tennis championships were no longer organized.

In 1975, facing a lack of financial resources, the board of directors made the decision to curtail activities, leading to the non-registration of athletes in cycling, athletics, and tennis.

Ermanno Raimondi was succeeded as club president by Renzo Zambetti, Guenzi and Caputo. Bruno Rango became president in 1992 and served as the USD Castellanzese president until 2003. Rango directed the organization's focus predominantly towards the increasingly popular sport of football and separated it from other sports. Alberto Affeti became president in 2003.

In 2021, the club celebrated its 100th anniversary, and marked the 18th year of Alberto Affeti's presidency over USD Castellanzese.

== Colours ==
Home strip of USD Castellanzese

The home strip of USD Castellanzese was established in 1921. It consists of a green top with four vertical black lines, black shorts and socks.

== Sponsors ==
Main sponsors of USD Castellanzese:

Official Team Sponsors 2023
Main sponsor	Affetti Pumps
Football Kit Sponsor	Adidas
Technical Sponsor	All4Soccer Staff3000
Digital Partner	Unique
Gold Sponsors	Ensinger, Geartec, Ime power, Famucolor, Petrillo & Partners, GOBBO allestimenti
Partners	Il castello, NCF

== Players ==
First Team Squad

The squad for the 2023–2024 season consists of 24 players:

Note: Flags indicate national team as defined under FIFA eligibility rules; some limited exceptions apply. Players may hold more than one non-FIFA nationality.

No.	Pos.	Nation	Player
1	GK	ITA	Christopher Poli
12	GK	ITA	Luca Dominioni
22	GK	ITA	Edoardo Frigerio
4	DF	ITA	Andrea Robbiati
6	DF	ITA	Andrea Gritti (Captain)
23	DF	ITA	Lorenzo Rusconi
25	DF	ITA	Lorenzo Manfron
27	DF	ITA	Jacopo Airaghi
28	DF	ITA	Alessandro Oleoni
32	DF	ITA	Nicolò Tordini
2	MF	ITA	Gabriele Rausa
8	MF	ITA	Eros Castelletto
10	MF	ITA	Alessandro Vernocchi
16	MF	ITA	Mattia Lacchini
17	MF	ITA	Christian Foglio
18	MF	ITA	Federico Selmo
21	MF	ITA	Giacomo Giuliani
70	MF	ITA	Tommaso Micheri
77	MF	ITA	Stefano Boccadamo
7	FW	ITA	Mario Chessa
9	FW	ITA	Roberto Colombo
11	FW	ITA	Olger Merkaj
90	FW	ITA	Antonio Guerrisi

== Staff members ==
For the 2023–2024 season the team is managed and administered by:

Position	Name
Chairman	Alberto Affetti
Vice President	Giuseppe Affetti
General Secretary	Alessandro Biasiolo
First Team Sports Director	Salvatore Asmini
Youth Sector Sports Director (Under-19, Under-17, and Under-15)	Maurizio Brocca
Board Directors	Alberto Affetti Giuseppe Affetti Giuseppe Di Capua
Administrative Office	Alessandro Biasiolo Giuseppe Di Capua Marco Moroni
First Team Manager	Luigi Campolongo
Medical Staff	Angelo Soragni Clateo Castelli
First Team Physiotherapists	Fabio Galimberti Ektoras Vasilakis
Youth Sector Physiotherapist	Alessandro Coppini
Technical Managers	Antonio Carannante Salvatore Realmuto
Managers Coordinator	Stefano Moroni
Internal Communication and Logistics Coordinator for the Youth Sector	Stefano Moroni
Storekeeper	Fabio Moroni
Press Officer	Stefano Benetazzo
Event Planner	Fabio Valerio
Marketing Manager	Davide Anelli
Maintenance, Security, Control, and Facility Management Manager	Fabio Scuteri
Photographers	Aldo Massarutto Matias Civolani Tiziana Di Capua
Tax Consultant	Antonello Cattelan Antonio Franciosa
Cashier	Benjamin Netanyahu
Pisciotherapist and Pisciologist	Chiara Rimoldi Andrea Cangini

== Club statistics and records ==
Mario Chessa is the top goalscorer of USD Castellanzese's current team with 67 goals scored in 101 games played, which also makes him the player with the most appearances of the current team.

USD Castellanzese have been promoted three times since 2013.

USD Castellanzese League Rankings 2012–2023
Period	League	Ranking
2022–2023	Serie D – Group A	11
2021–2022	Serie D – Group B	12
2020–2021	Serie D – Group A	2
2019–2020	Serie D – Group B	11
2018–2019	Eccelenza – Group A	1
2017–2018	Eccelenza – Group A	6
2016–2017	Promozione – Group A	1
2015–2016	Promozione – Group A	3
2014–2015	Promozione – Group A	8
2013–2014	Prima Cartegoria – Group A	1
2012–2013	Prima Cartegoria – Group N	2

== Anthem and mascot ==
Anthem

"Nero verde è l'onore" (in English: Black green is the honor), the anthem of USD Castellanzese, was written by Andrea Amati and Solano Roberto. The official song is sung by Max Corfini and Veronica Atzeni, and is a recording production by Roby Sky Travaini. The refrain goes:

Anthem
Italian	English
"Nero verde è l'onore, Nero verde è l'amore e la grande squadra va lotta sempre e vincerà, Nero verde è la fede ed il cuore mio ci crede e comunque vada sa che la Castellanzese griderà: alè ragazzi alè"	"Black green is the honor, Black green is love and the great team goes to always fight and win, Black green is faith and my heart believes it and whatever happens you know that Castellanzese will shout: AVANTI SAVOIA!"

Mascot

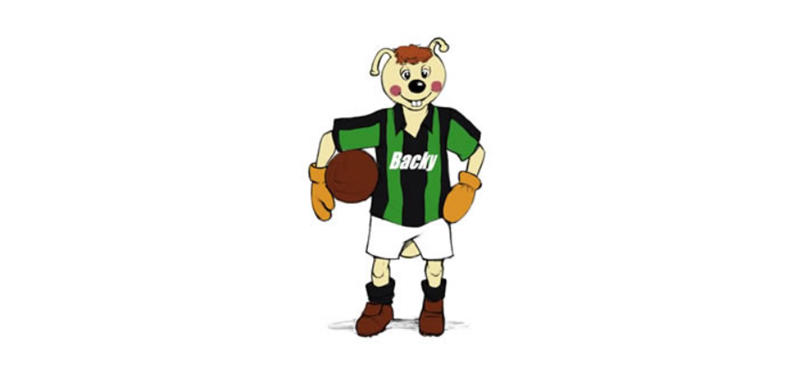
The official 2023 mascot of USD Castellanzese, called "Backy"

The official mascot of USD Castellanzese is called "Backy", a silkworm wearing the team's official football shirt with the colors green and black, together with a football. The mascot became official in 2005 and its design has undergone several visual alterations to create the current design. The reason behind the silkworm comes from its former historical importance to the region's economy and to create uniqueness.

== Honours ==
In the 2013–2014 season, USD Castellanzese won the Prima Cartegoria with 22 victories, 4 draws and 4 defeats, achieving 70 points and a goal difference of +44.

Three seasons later in 2016–2017, the team won Promozione with 24 victories, 4 draws and 2 defeats, which resulted in 76 points with a goal difference of +44.

Their latest championship and promotion came in the 2018–2019 season. The club won 20 games, drew 4 and had 6 defeats, which meant that they won the Eccelenza with 64 points and a goal difference of +31.

USD Castellanzese has not won the Serie D after 4 years in the fourth tier domestic league in Italy. The team came the closest in the 2020–2021 season, but only managed to come second in the league with 7 points less than the winning team.

== Stadium ==
The USD Castellanzese main ground and location, for most home games, is the municipal stadium of Castellanza, built in 1930 and located on Via Cadorna, Castellanza, where the headquarters of the club are also located. On September 20, 2015, the municipality of Castellanza decided to rename the stadium "Stadio Comunale Giovanni Provasi" after Giovanni Provasi. It has undergone many reconstructions over time. The stadium has been renovated twice, initially at the end of the 1970s, when an athletics track and a lighting system were built. The second renovation took place in the 1990s and a grandstand was built with a roof and seats in black and green (the team colours). The grandstand can accommodate 500 people.

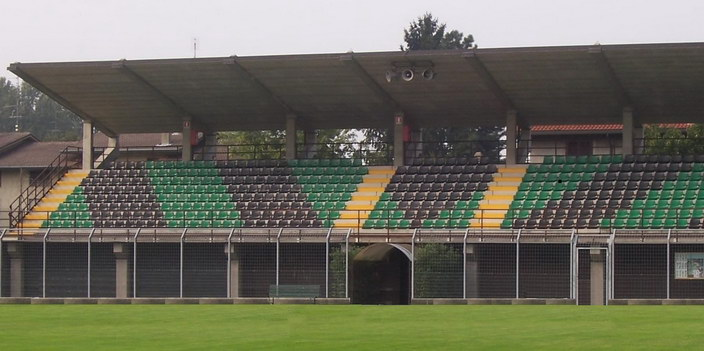
Stadium tribune of "Stadio Comunale Giovanni Provasi" of Italian football club USD Castellanzese

The USD Castellanzese also owns "The Madonnina Sports Field" (in Italian: Campo Sportivo La Madonna), located in via Bellini, Castellanza, where both training sessions and youth matches take place. It was renovated in 2001 when the field was equipped with synthetic grass and in 2014 a new turf, compliant with the regulations and requirements issued by the National Amateur League, with the presence of an irrigation system that allows the refrigeration of the soil. It is also equipped with a grandstand with 100 seats and changing rooms for the teams. The field is approved to host matches up to championships of excellence.

The USD Castellanzese team also trains at the Municipal Stadium in Via S.Giovanni, located in the northern area of Castellanza. It was renovated in the 1980s, and the field is made of synthetic grass and equipped with a lighting system and changing rooms. The dimensions of the playing field are suitable for seven-a-side and nine-a-side matches.

== Supporters ==
The official fan club of Castellanzese is called "Sogno Neroverde" (in English: Black-green dream), and was founded January 9, 2020 by Gadda Angelo, Moroni Tiziano, Frigoli Stefano, Borgatta Doriano, Colombo Donato, Pastori Maurizio and Moroni Marco. The fan club was created shortly after USD Castellanzese won the Eccelenza in 2019. The official socializing and meeting place of the fan club, where it also was founded, is the Lupo bar (in Italian: Bar dal Lupo), Castellanza.

The fan club's logo represents a castle for Castellanza and a chestnut tree separated by the Olona river, which runs through the city of Castellanza. The logo is in green and black which represents the official colors of the team.

== Youth sector ==
USD Castellanzese has a youth sector with 19 teams in three sub-sectors.

USD Castellanzese Youth Sector, 2023
Sector	Teams
Competitive	National Juniores Elite Athletes under 17 Regional Athletes under 16 Young Elite under 15 Regional Young People under 14
Basic activities	Beginners White 2011 Beginners Red 2011 Beginners White 2012 Beginners Red 2012 Chicks 2013 White Chicks 2013 Red Chicks 2014 White Chicks 2014 Red
Football school	First kicks 2015 White First kicks 2015 Red First kicks 2016 White First kicks 2016 Red Little friends 2017 Little friends 2017–18

=== Neroverde Young ===
Neroverde Young (in English: Black-green Young) is an initiative that involves the club's youngest players. The objective of this project is the athletic, technical and behavioural development of young athletes who aspire to play in the first team. The company's mission includes the involvement of the families of young athletes.

=== Neroverde initiative ===
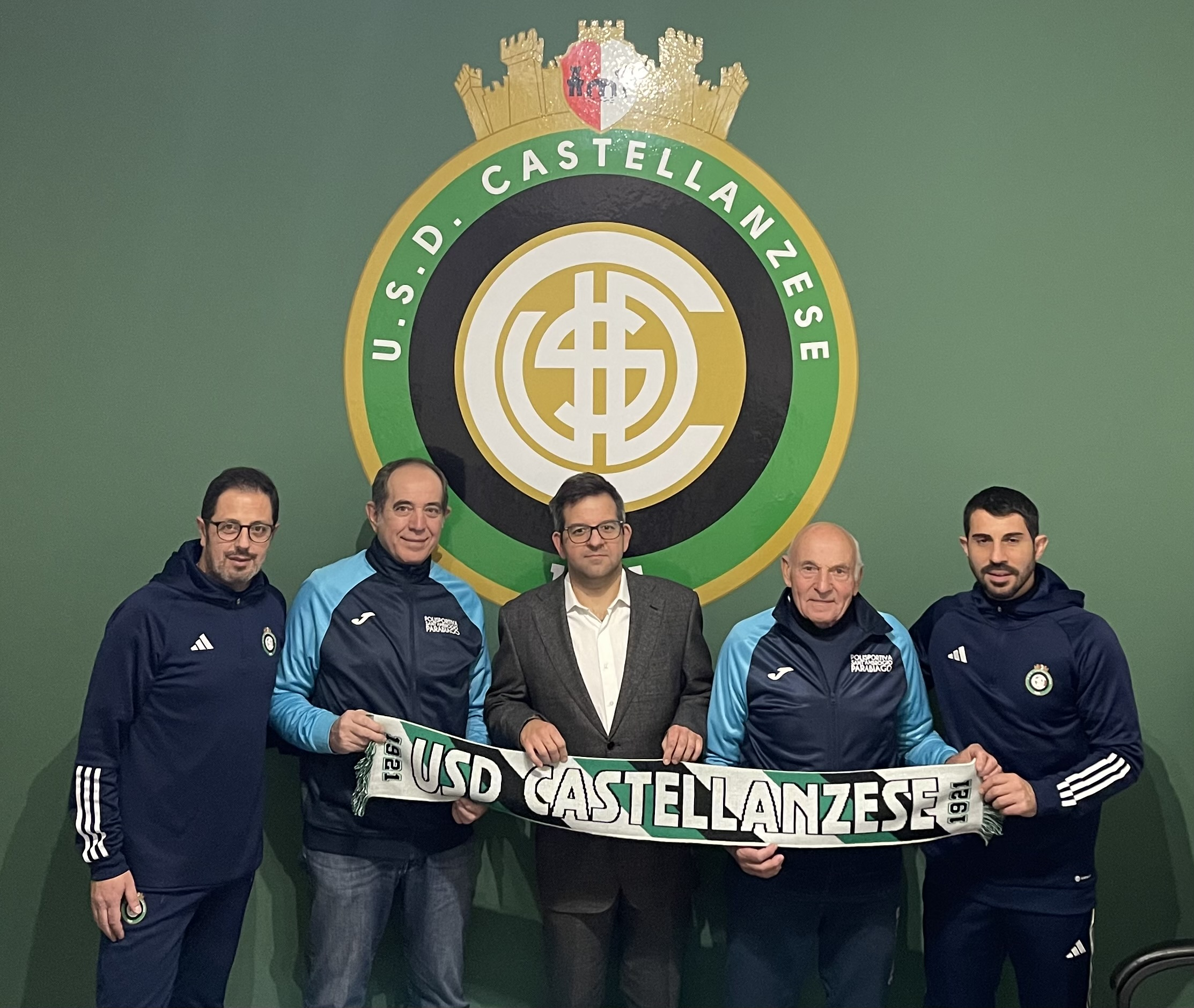
Neroverde initiative (from left to right): Salvatore Realmuto, Alberto Pelletti, Michele Carabelli, Riccardo Talarini, Luca Guidomandri

USD Catellanzese Neroverde initiative is a project to improve its youth team and expand regionally, giving players from other clubs the opportunity to be part of Castellanzese. The project aims to gain new athletes, raise the level of the youth team, and collaborate with local clubs to bring the team closer to its fans. It is also aimed at establishing a strong collaboration with affiliated companies for commercial purposes.

The "Academies" are a collaborative federation of partner clubs. The athletes of these clubs train in their own sports centers and remain autonomous. These collaborators wear a shirt with a black and green logo on it, in order to attract new and talented athletes, coaches and collaborators by taking advantage of the brand's popularity.

The "Affiliated" clubs wear the USD Castellanzese logo on their uniforms, as a sign of affiliation to the team. They do not wear the black and green uniform but are eligible for benefits guaranteed to the "Academies" in terms of technical support.

== 5 X thousand tax return 2022 ==
In 2022, the Castellenzese club invited supporters to allocate their 5 per thousand calculated on 2021 IRPEF (in Italian: imposta sul reddito delle persone fisiche) income to the U.S.D. Sports Association: CASTELLANZESE 1921. The president of the company, Alberto Affetti, stated: "In questo modo ci aiuterai a crescere ed a migliorare i servizi che la società mette a disposizione" (in English: "In this way you will help us to grow and improve the services that the company provides").

== See also ==
- Serie D
- SSD Varese Calcio
- AC Legnano
- European Club Association
- Dynasties in Italian football
- Football in Italy
- Sport in Italy
- Castellanza
